= List of FC Kairat seasons =

List of FC Kairat seasons

== Domestic history ==
Season	League									Kazakhstan Cup	Top goalscorer		Manager
Season	Div.	Pos.	Pl.	W	D	L	GS	GA	P	Kazakhstan Cup	Name	League	Manager
1992	1st	1	26	16	5	5	48	22	53	Winners			(Kazakhstan) B.Baiseitov
1993	1st	11	22	5	3	14	23	41	18	Second round			(Kazakhstan) B.Baiseitov / (Kazakhstan) G.Katkov
1994	1st	11	30	10	6	14	36	42	36	First round			(Kazakhstan) G.Katkov / (Turkmenistan) K.Berdyev
1995	1st	9	30	13	2	15	37	35	41	First round			(Turkmenistan) K.Berdyev
1996	1st	6	34	19	5	10	61	30	62				(Kazakhstan) V.Masudov
1997	1st	3	26	16	5	5	52	14	53	Winners			(Kazakhstan) V.Masudov
1998	2nd	2	4	3	0	1	8	1	9				(Kazakhstan) V.Masudov
1999	1st	3	30	21	1	8	62	19	64	Winners	(Turkmenistan) Rejepmyrat Agabaýew	24	(Kazakhstan) V.Nikitenko
2000	1st	4	28	18	6	4	48	17	60		(Kazakhstan) Oleg Litvinenko	13	(Kazakhstan) V.Nikitenko / (Kazakhstan) A.Chernov
2001	1st	5	32	15	7	10	42	33	52	Winners			(Kazakhstan) V.Masudov / (Serbia) Z.Krmpotić
2002	1st	7	32	13	7	12	41	36	46		(Kazakhstan) Alibek Buleshev	13	(Serbia) Z.Krmpotić
2003	1st	7	32	14	7	11	51	42	49	Winners	(Kazakhstan) Alibek Buleshev	13	(Tajikistan) V.Gulyamhaydarov / (Kazakhstan) L.Ostroushko
2004	1st	1	36	25	8	3	70	21	83	Runners up	(Kazakhstan) Arsen Tlekhugov	22	(Russia) L.Pakhomov / (Russia) A.Petrushin
2005	1st	3	30	18	8	4	56	22	62	Runners up	(Uzbekistan) Jafar Irismetov	10	(Russia) A.Petrushin / (Tajikistan) V.Gulyamhaydarov
2006	1st	7	30	12	10	8	39	30	46		(Kazakhstan) Alibek Buleshev	10	(Kazakhstan) B.Baiseitov / (Turkmenistan) T.Agamyradow / (Kazakhstan) I.Khomukha
2007	1st	13	30	9	3	18	23	43	30		(Kazakhstan) Alibek Buleshev	4	(Kazakhstan) S.Klimov / (Kazakhstan) V.Masudov
2008	1st	10	30	9	10	11	25	28	34	Quarterfinal	(Kazakhstan) Alibek Buleshev	7	(Kazakhstan) V.Masudov
2009	2nd	1	26	19	4	3	63	21	42	First Round	(Kazakhstan) Igor Abdushchev (Kazakhstan) Dauren Kusainov	14	(Kazakhstan) S.Volgin
2010	1st	10	32	6	11	15	17	38	29	Third Round	(Kazakhstan) Chingiz Abugaliyev	4	(Kazakhstan) S.Volgin / (Kazakhstan) E.Kuznetsov
2011	1st	11	32	8	8	16	30	49	22	Quarterfinal	(Russia) Konstantin Golovskoy	10	(Kazakhstan) V.Nikitenko / (England) J.Gregory
2012	1st	10	26	7	8	11	23	34	29	Second Round	(Croatia) Josip Knežević	6	(Kazakhstan) D.Ogai / (Spain) J.Serer
2013	1st	3	32	12	12	8	44	38	33	Second Round	(The Gambia) Momodou Ceesay	12	(Slovakia) V.Weiss
2014	1st	3	32	18	5	9	58	31	38	Winners	(Ivory Coast) Gerard Gohou	12	(Slovakia) V.Weiss
2015	1st	2	32	20	7	5	60	19	45	Winners	(Ivory Coast) Gerard Gohou	22	(Slovakia) V.Weiss
2016	1st	2	32	22	5	5	75	30	71	Runners up	(Ivory Coast) Gerard Gohou	22	(Russia) A.Borodyuk / (Georgia (country)) K.Tskhadadze
2017	1st	2	32	23	9	1	75	28	78	Winners	(Ivory Coast) Gerard Gohou	24	(Georgia (country)) K.Tskhadadze / (Kazakhstan) S.Labodovsky / (Spain) C.Ferrer
