= Ruslan Baltiyev =

Kazakhstani footballer

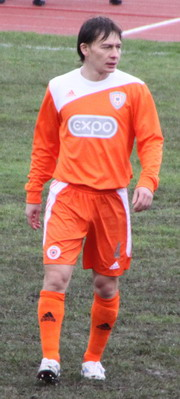

Personal information
- Full name: Ruslan Takhiruly Baltiyev
- Date of birth: 16 September 1978 (age 48)
- Place of birth: Alma-Ata, Kazakh SSR, Soviet Union
- Height: 1.76 m (5 ft 9 in)
- Position: Midfielder

Team information
- Current team: Kazakhstan (assistant coach); Akhmat Grozny (assistant coach)

Senior career*
Years	Team	Apps	(Gls)
1996	Zhetysu	13	(1)
1997–1999	Kairat	60	(10)
2000	Kyzylzhar	15	(2)
2001–2002	Sokol Saratov	54	(7)
2003	Dynamo Moscow	30	(2)
2004–2006	Moscow	30	(1)
2005	→ Shinnik Yaroslavl (loan)	11	(1)
2007–2009	Tobol	69	(16)
2010	Zhemchuzhina-Sochi	20	(1)
2011–2012	Kairat	22	(2)
Total		324	(43)

International career
1997–2009	Kazakhstan	73	(13)

Managerial career
- 2013: Okzhetpes (sporting director)
- 2013–2015: Kaisar (assistant)
- 2014–2015: Kaisar (CEO)
- 2015–2016: Tobol (assistant)
- 2020–2021: Zhetysu (sporting director)
- 2022–: Kazakhstan (assistant)
- 2024–: Akhmat Grozny (assistant)
- * Club domestic league appearances and goals

Ruslan Takhiruly Baltiyev (Kazakh: Рұслан Тахирұлы Балтиев, Rūslan Tahirūly Baltiev; born 16 September 1978) is a Kazakh professional football coach, official and a former player who played as a midfielder. He is an assistant coach with the Kazakhstan national team and the Russian club Akhmat Grozny.

== Club career ==
Baltiyev started his career with FC Zhetysu in 1997 and after a remarkable first season in professional football moved to Kazakhstani grand FC Kairat. He also made his debut for the national team the same year. After four seasons in the domestic league, his play was noticed by Russian club FC Sokol Saratov. Baltiyev spent two seasons with the Russian Premier League club and proved his credentials in Russian football. After his team's relegation in 2002, he was linked with transfers to Ukrainian and Russian top sides, and eventually found himself at FC Dinamo Moskva, where he became a key player in the 2003 season, having played all matches, helping the club to finish sixth in the league. After a successful season with Dinamo Baltiyev completed a move to another Moscow side FC Moscow, where after two seasons he failed to keep his place in the main squad and returned to Kazakhstan, to play for one of the strongest teams of the domestic league FC Tobol. Baltiyev was one of the best players in the league and helped his new club Tobol to compete for the title and play in European competitions. In December 2009 Baltiyev signed a two-year contract with FC Zhemchuzhina-Sochi, Russian First Division club.

== Honours ==
Kyzylzhar

Runner-up

- Kazakhstan Premier League: 2000
- Kazakhstan Cup: 1999–2000

Tobol

Winner

- Kazakhstan Cup: 2007

Runner-up

- Kazakhstan Premier League (2): 2007, 2008

== Career statistics ==
=== Club ===
Club performance			League		Cup		League Cup		Continental		Total	
Season	Club	League	Apps	Goals	Apps	Goals	Apps	Goals	Apps	Goals	Apps	Goals
Kazakhstan			League		Kazakhstan Cup		League Cup		Asia		Total	
1996	Zhetysu	Kazakhstan Premier League	13	1	?	0	-		-		13	1
1997	Kairat	Kazakhstan Premier League	60	3	?	1	-		-		60	4
1998	Kairat	Kazakhstan Premier League	60	3	?	1	-		-		60	4
1999	Kairat	Kazakhstan Premier League	60	4	-	-	-		-		60	4
2000	Kyzylzhar	Kazakhstan Premier League	15	2	?	3	-		-		15	5
Russia			League		Russian Cup		League Cup		Europe		Total	
2001	Sokol Saratov	Russian Premier League	27	2	3	0	-		-		30	2
2002	Sokol Saratov	Russian Premier League	27	5	2	0	-		-		29	5
2003	Dinamo Moscow	Russian Premier League	30	2	2	0	2	0	-		34	2
2004	Moscow	Russian Premier League	27	1	7	2	-		-		34	3
2005	Moscow	Russian Premier League	3	0	1	0	-		-		4	0
2005	Shinnik Yaroslavl	Russian Premier League	11	1	1	1	-		-		12	2
2006	Moscow	Russian Premier League	0	0	0	0	-		-		0	0
Kazakhstan			League		Kazakhstan Cup		League Cup		Europe		Total	
2007	Tobol	Kazakhstan Premier League	23	7	6	4	0	0	7	3	36	14
2008	Tobol	Kazakhstan Premier League	27	5	5	2	0	0	2	0	34	7
2009	Tobol	Kazakhstan Premier League	19	4	2	0	0	0	2	0	23	4
Russia			League		Russian Cup		League Cup		Europe		Total	
2010	Zhemchuzhina-Sochi	Russian First Division	20	1	0	0	-		-		20	1
Kazakhstan			League		Kazakhstan Cup		League Cup		Europe		Total	
2011	Kairat	Kazakhstan Premier League	19	2	2	0	-		-		21	2
2012	Kairat	Kazakhstan Premier League	3	0	0	0	-		-		3	0
Total	Kazakhstan		179	31	15	11	-		11	3	205	45
Total	Russia		145	12	16	3	2	0	-		163	15
Career total			324	43	31	14	2	0	11	3	368	60

=== International goals ===
#	Date	Venue	Opponent	Score	Result	Competition
1.	20 September 1997	Central Stadium, Almaty, Kazakhstan	Uzbekistan	1–1	Draw	1998 FIFA WC Qual.
2.	10 December 2000	Sheikh Zayed Stadium, Abu Dhabi, UAE	United Arab Emirates	5–2	Lost	Friendly
3.	10 December 2000	Sheikh Zayed Stadium, Abu Dhabi, UAE	United Arab Emirates	5–2	Lost	Friendly
4.	12 April 2001	Al-Shaab, Baghdad, Iraq	Nepal	0–6	Win	2002 FIFA WC Qual.
5.	16 April 2001	Al-Shaab, Baghdad, Iraq	Iraq	1–1	Draw	2002 FIFA WC Qual.
6.	21 April 2001	Central Stadium, Almaty, Kazakhstan	Nepal	4–0	Win	2002 FIFA WC Qual.
7.	17 November 2004	Karaiskakis Stadium, Piraeus, Greece	Greece	3–1	Lost	2006 FIFA WC Qual.
8.	2 July 2006	Central Stadium, Almaty, Kazakhstan	Tajikistan	4–1	Win	Friendly
9.	2 June 2007	Central Stadium, Almaty, Kazakhstan	Armenia	1–2	Lost	Euro 2008 Qual.
10.	6 June 2007	Central Stadium, Almaty, Kazakhstan	Azerbaijan	1–1	Draw	Euro 2008 Qual.
11.	11 February 2009	Atatürk Stadium, Antalya, Turkey	Estonia	2–0	Win	Friendly
12.	11 February 2009	Atatürk Stadium, Antalya, Turkey	Estonia	2–0	Win	Friendly
13.	9 September 2009	Estadi Comunal, Andorra la Vella, Andorra	Andorra	3–1	Win	2010 FIFA WC Qual.
Correct as of 7 October 2015
