= Nurbol Zhumaskaliyev =

Kazakhstani footballer

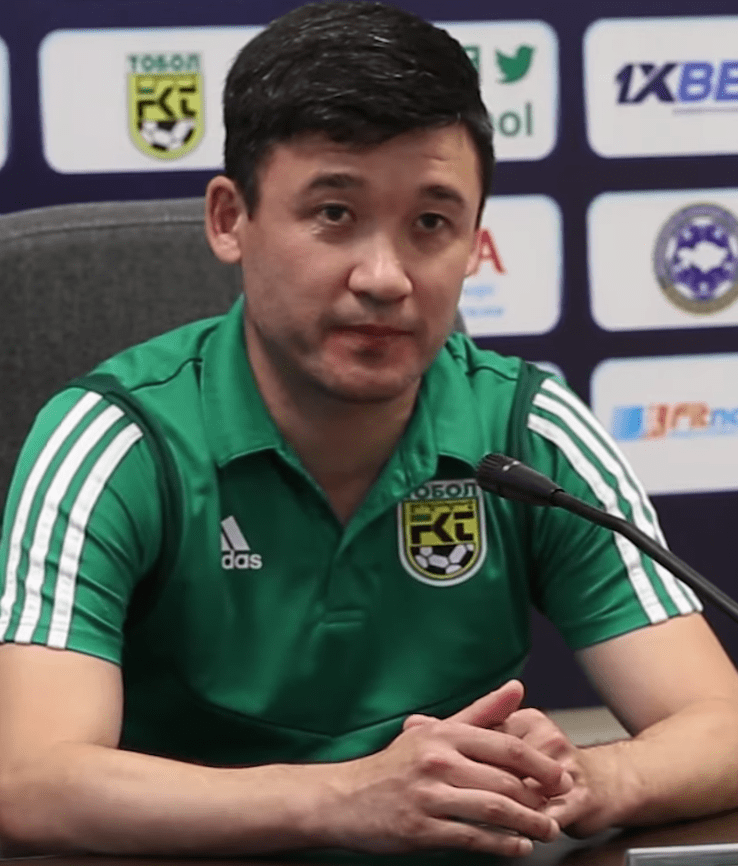
- Zhumaskaliyev in 2019

Personal information
- Date of birth: 11 May 1981 (age 45)
- Place of birth: Uralsk, Kazakh SSR, Soviet Union
- Height: 1.74 m (5 ft 9 in)
- Positions: Attacking midfielder; forward

Team information
- Current team: Tobol (manager)

Youth career
- Namys (Almaty)
- Akzhayik

Senior career*
Years	Team	Apps	(Gls)
1998	Akzhayik	13	(0)
1999	Zhetysu	24	(0)
2000–2010	Tobol	300	(127)
2011	Lokomotiv Astana	31	(10)
2012–2016	Tobol	130	(29)
2017	Irtysh	7	(0)
2017–2018	Tobol	20	(0)
Total		525	(166)

International career
2001–2014	Kazakhstan	58	(7)

Managerial career
- 2019: Tobol (assistant)
- 2019: Tobol (caretaker)
- 2020–2024: Tobol (sporting director)
- 2021–2023: Kazakhstan U21 (assistant)
- 2024: Tobol (caretaker)
- 2024–: Tobol
- 2025: Kazakhstan (assistant)
- * Club domestic league appearances and goals

Nurbol Zhardemuly Zhumaskaliyev (Kazakh: Нұрбол Жәрдемұлы Жұмасқалиев, romanized: Nūrbol Järdemūly Jūmasqaliev; born 11 May 1981) is a Kazakh football coach and a former player who played as an attacking midfielder and forward. He is the manager of Tobol.

== Career ==
=== Early career ===
At the age of 11, Nurbol was selected for a youth club, Namys (Almaty), which was created to find the most promising talents in the nation. His first coach was Talgat Nurmagambetov.

=== Club career ===
Nurbol started his senior career at FC Akzhayik and played for FC Zhetysu in next season. In 2000 Nurbol moved to FC Tobol, where he soon became the club captain. He scored 7 goals in European competitions.

After being sent-off on 16 October 2016 in Tobol's 1–0 defeat to Akzhayik for foul and abusive language, Zhumaskaliyev received a seven-match ban. Zhumaskaliyev went on to leave Tobol in December 2016.

On 30 June 2017, Zhumaskaliyev left Irtysh Pavlodar by mutual consent.

On 27 December 2018, FC Tobol announced Zhumaskaliyev as their new Sporting Director.

=== International ===
At the age of 20, Nurbol earned his first cap on 16 October 2001 in a friendly against Estonia. He was dropped initially during the World Cup 2006 qualifiers, in favour of Ruslan Baltiev, but regained his place when Baltiev was injured. He was capped 58 times for the national team, scoring 7 goals.

== Career statistics ==
=== Club ===
As of match played 16 October 2016

Appearances and goals by club, season and competition
Club	Season	League			National Cup		Continental		Other		Total	
Club	Season	Division	Apps	Goals	Apps	Goals	Apps	Goals	Apps	Goals	Apps	Goals
Akzhayik	1998	Kazakhstan Premier League	13	0			–		–		13	0
Zhetysu	1999	Kazakhstan Premier League	24	0			–		–		24	0
Tobol	2000	Kazakhstan Premier League	22	9			–		–		22	9
Tobol	2001	Kazakhstan Premier League	30	12	2	0	–		–		32	12
Tobol	2002	Kazakhstan Premier League	21	4	1	0	–		–		22	4
Tobol	2003	Kazakhstan Premier League	30	16			6	1	–		36	17
Tobol	2004	Kazakhstan Premier League	36	19	0	0	–		–		36	19
Tobol	2005	Kazakhstan Premier League	22	9	0	0	–		–		22	9
Tobol	2006	Kazakhstan Premier League	28	14	4	0	2	1	–		34	15
Tobol	2007	Kazakhstan Premier League	27	9	4	0	7	2	–		38	11
Tobol	2008	Kazakhstan Premier League	28	12	3	1	2	0	–		33	13
Tobol	2009	Kazakhstan Premier League	24	8	2	1	2	1	–		27	10
Tobol	2010	Kazakhstan Premier League	32	15	0	0	2	2	–		34	17
Tobol	Total		300	127	16	2	21	7	-	-	337	136
Lokomotiv Astana	2011	Kazakhstan Premier League	31	10	1	0	–		–		32	10
Tobol	2012	Kazakhstan Premier League	26	6	4	0	–		–		22	9
Tobol	2013	Kazakhstan Premier League	30	9	2	0	–		–		32	12
Tobol	2014	Kazakhstan Premier League	28	5	1	0	–		–		22	4
Tobol	2015	Kazakhstan Premier League	19	5	1	1	–		–		36	17
Tobol	2016	Kazakhstan Premier League	27	4	0	0	–		–		27	4
Tobol	Total		130	29	8	1	-	-	-	-	138	30
Irtysh Pavlodar	2017	Kazakhstan Premier League	7	0	2	0	1	0	–		10	0
Tobol	2017	Kazakhstan Premier League	10	0	0	0	–		–		10	0
Career total			515	166	27	3	22	7	-	-	564	176

=== International ===
Kazakhstan national team
Year	Apps	Goals
2001	1	0
2002	2	0
2003	3	0
2004	4	2
2005	4	1
2006	9	1
2007	14	1
2008	8	0
2009	0	0
2010	5	1
2011	2	0
2012	1	0
2013	3	0
2014	2	1
Total	58	7

Statistics accurate as of match played 7 June 2016

=== International goals ===
As of 5 March 2014

#	Date	Venue	Opponent	Score	Result	Competition	Ref
1.	19 February 2004	Pafiako Stadium, Paphos, Cyprus	Armenia	1–0	2–1	Friendly	
2.	19 February 2004	Pafiako Stadium, Paphos, Cyprus	Armenia	2–0	2–1	Friendly	
3.	7 September 2005	Almaty Central Stadium, Almaty, Kazakhstan	Greece	1–1	1–2	WC Qualifiers 2006	
4.	2 July 2006	Almaty Central Stadium, Almaty, Kazakhstan	Tajikistan	1–0	4–1	Friendly	
5.	24 March 2007	Almaty Central Stadium, Almaty, Kazakhstan	Serbia	2–0	2–1	UEFA Euro 2008 qualification	
6.	11 August 2010	Astana Arena, Astana, Kazakhstan	Oman	2–1	3–1	Friendly	
7.	5 March 2014	Mardan Sports Complex, Antalya, Turkey	Lithuania	1–1	1–1	Friendly	

== Honours ==
=== Club ===
Tobol

- Kazakhstan Premier League (1): 2010
- Kazakhstan Cup (1): 2007
- UEFA Intertoto Cup (1): 2007

=== Personal ===
- 2003, 2005, 2010 Kazakhstan FF "Best Player of the year"
