= Viktor Zubarev (footballer) =

Kazakhstani footballer

Personal information
- Full name: Viktor Yegorovich Zubarev
- Date of birth: 10 April 1973
- Place of birth: Aksu, Soviet Union
- Date of death: 18 October 2004 (aged 31)
- Place of death: Omsk, Russia
- Height: 1.98 m (6 ft 6 in)
- Position: Centre-forward

Senior career*
Years	Team	Apps	(Gls)
1993–1996	Batyr	76	(18)
1997	Irtysh	23	(10)
1998	Arsenal Tula	18	(6)
1998	Lokomotiv Nizhny Novgorod	18	(4)
1999–2000	Irtysh	37	(25)
2000–2002	Apollon Limassol	42	(23)
2002–2003	Irtysh	34	(8)
2003–2004	Kyzylzhar	36	(16)
Total		284	(110)

International career^{‡}
1997–2002	Kazakhstan	18	(12)
- * Club domestic league appearances and goals as of 11 February 2008 ‡ National team caps and goals as of 11 February 2008

Viktor Yegorovich Zubarev (Russian: Виктор Егорович Зубарев) (10 April 1973 – 18 October 2004) was a football forward from Kazakhstan. He was nicknamed Uncle Stepan (дядя Стёпа).

== Career ==
He played for Batyr, Irtysh and Esil Bogatyr in his native country, for Arsenal Tula and Lokomotiv Nizhny Novgorod in Russia, and for Apollon Limassol in Cyprus.

== International team ==
Zubarev was called up by coach Serik Berdalin to represent the national team in a match against Pakistan for the 1998 FIFA World Cup qualifiers. He scored his first hat-trick in this match, which Kazakhstan won 7–0. He would go on to score 12 goals in 18 caps, being the second top scorer of the national team, only surpassed by Ruslan Baltiev.

== Death ==
Zubarev died of drug overdose in his apartment in Omsk.

== Career statistics ==
As of match played 15 July 2014

Club	Season	League			National Cup		Continental		Total	
Club	Season	Division	Apps	Goals	Apps	Goals	Apps	Goals	Apps	Goals
Batyr	1993	Kazakhstan Top Division	8	1			-		8	1
Batyr	1994	Kazakhstan Top Division	20	4			-		20	4
Batyr	1995	Kazakhstan Top Division	16	2			-		16	2
Batyr	1996	Kazakhstan Top Division	32	11			-		32	11
Batyr	Total		76	18			-	-	76	18
Irtysh Pavlodar	1997	Kazakhstan Top Division	23	10			-		23	10
Arsenal Tula	1998	Russian First Division	18	6			-		18	6
Lokomotiv Nizhny Novgorod	1998	Russian First Division	18	4			-		18	6
Irtysh Pavlodar	1999	Kazakhstan Top Division	27	22			-		27	22
Irtysh Pavlodar	2000	Kazakhstan Top Division	10	3					10	3
Irtysh Pavlodar	Total		37	25					37	25
Apollon Limassol	2000–01	Cypriot First Division	25	15			-		25	15
Apollon Limassol	2001–02	Cypriot First Division	17	8			4	2	21	10
Apollon Limassol	Total		42	23			4	2	42	23
Irtysh Pavlodar	2002	Kazakhstan Super League	29	8			-		29	8
Irtysh Pavlodar	2003	Kazakhstan Super League	5	0			0	0	5	0
Irtysh Pavlodar	Total		34	8			0	0	34	8
FC Kyzylzhar	2003	Kazakhstan Super League	13	7			-		13	7
FC Kyzylzhar	2004	Kazakhstan Super League	23	9			-		23	9
FC Kyzylzhar	Total		36	16			-	-	36	16
Career total			284	110			4	2	288	112

=== International ===
Appearances and goals by national team and year
National team	Year	Apps	Goals
Kazakhstan	1997	7	4
Kazakhstan	1998	5	6
Kazakhstan	2000	5	2
Kazakhstan	2002	1	0
Total		18	12

=== International goals ===
All his scored goals are shown in the box below, with the Score and Result column listing Kazakhstan's goal tally first.

#	Date	Venue	Opponent	Score	Result	Competition
1	1997-06-11	Lahore, Pakistan	Pakistan	5–0	7–0	1998 FIFA World Cup qualification
2	1997-06-11	Lahore, Pakistan	Pakistan	6–0	7–0	1998 FIFA World Cup qualification
3	1997-06-11	Lahore, Pakistan	Pakistan	7–0	7–0	1998 FIFA World Cup qualification
4	1997-10-04	Almaty, Kazakhstan	Japan	1–1	1–1	1998 FIFA World Cup qualification
5	1998-12-03	Sisaket, Thailand	Laos	1–0	5–0	1998 Asian Games
6	1998-12-03	Sisaket, Thailand	Laos	3–0	5–0	1998 Asian Games
7	1998-12-03	Sisaket, Thailand	Laos	4–0	5–0	1998 Asian Games
8	1998-12-03	Sisaket, Thailand	Laos	5–0	5–0	1998 Asian Games
9	1998-12-08	Bangkok, Thailand	Thailand	1–1	1–1	1998 Asian Games
10	1998-12-10	Bangkok, Thailand	Qatar	1–0	2–0	1998 Asian Games
11	2000-04-08	Doha, Qatar	Pakistan	1–0	4–0	2000 AFC ACQ
12	2000-04-08	Doha, Qatar	Pakistan	2–0	4–0	2000 AFC ACQ

== Honours ==
=== Club ===
Irtysh Pavlodar

- Top Division/Super League (4): 1997, 1999, 2002, 2003
- Kazakhstan Cup (1): 1997–98

Apollon Limassol

- Cypriot Cup (1): 2000–01

=== Personal ===
- GOAL Journal "Best Player of the year": 1999
- Cypriot Cup Winner: 2001
