= 1993 Kazakhstan Cup final =

- Event: 1993 Kazakhstan Cup
Dostyk	Taraz
4	2
- Date: 8 November 1993
- Venue: Central Stadium, Almaty
- Referee: Sergei Borodin (Karagandy)
- Attendance: 1,000

The 1993 Kazakhstan Cup final was the second final of the Kazakhstan Cup. The match was contested by Dostyk and Taraz at Central Stadium in Almaty. The match was played on 8 November 1993 and was the final match of the competition.

== Background ==
Dostyk played the first Kazakhstan Cup Final.

Taraz played the second Kazakhstan Cup Final. In the first final they lost Kairat with the score 5-1.

Dostyk and Taraz were played twice during the season of league. On May 20, 1993 they beat Taraz in the first game 2-1 at the Central stadium. On June 14, 1993 Dostyk won against Taraz with the score 3-1.

== Route to the Final ==
=== Dostyk ===
Round	Opposition	Score
FR	Tselinnik (A)	0–1
SR	Uralets-Arma (H)	3–1
QF	Kokshetau (H)	w/o
SF	Dynamo Almaty (A)	1–2
Key: (h) = Home venue; (a) = Away venue; (n) = Neutral venue.

=== Taraz ===
Round	Opposition	Score
FR	Batyr (A)	2–2 (3–4 p)
SR	SKIF-Ordabasy (H)	2–0
QF	Shakhter (H)	3–0
SF	Ansat (H)	1–0
Key: (h) = Home venue; (a) = Away venue; (n) = Neutral venue.

== Match ==
=== Details ===
8 November 1993

Dostyk	4–2	Taraz
Luchkin 30', 43', 70'; Shanin 65'	Report	Shmarikov 40'; Avdeev 49'

Central Stadium, Almaty
Attendance: 1,000
Referee: Sergei Borodin (Karagandy)

GK	(Kazakhstan) Mikhail Mozgovenko
DF	(Kazakhstan) Oleg Trofimov
DF	(Kazakhstan) Yuri Konkov
MF	(Kazakhstan) Nurzhan Doskeev
MF	(Kazakhstan) Elmurat Rysbaev	(yellow card) 52'
MF	(Russia) Vasili Shanin
MF	(Russia) Yevgeni Konyukhov	(substituted off) 52'
MF	(Kazakhstan) Aleksei Klishin	(substituted off) 55'
FW	(Kazakhstan) Eldar Gasanov	(substituted off) 80'
FW	(Kazakhstan) Dmitri Malikov
MF	(Kazakhstan) Roman Luchkin	(yellow card) 51'
Substitutes:
GK	(Kazakhstan) Oleg Borisenko
DF	(Kazakhstan) Dmitri Tatyanin
DF	(Kazakhstan) Daniyar Akchalov
MF	(Kazakhstan) Arkadi Bakulin	(substituted in) 52'
MF	(Kazakhstan) Vladimir Nikitenko	(substituted in) 55'
MF	(Kazakhstan) Aydyn Rakhimbaev
FW	(Kazakhstan) Andrei Akhunov	(substituted in) 80'
Manager:
(Kazakhstan) Vladimir Nikitenko

GK	(Belarus) Igor Zhebin
DF	(Kazakhstan) Ruslan Ismailov
DF	(Kazakhstan) Oleg Kachagin
DF	(Kazakhstan) Bekmurat Khaitmuratov	(yellow card) 8'
MF	(Kazakhstan) Igor Avdeev	(yellow card) 75'
MF	(Kazakhstan) Marat Syzdykov
MF	(Kazakhstan) Yakov Shcherbakov
MF	(Kazakhstan) Farkhad Mirsalimbayev
FW	(Kazakhstan) Nurken Mazbaev
FW	(Kazakhstan) Anatoli Belskiy	(yellow card) 58'	(substituted off) 65'
FW	(Kazakhstan) Aleksandr Shmarikov
Substitutes:
GK	(Kazakhstan) Aleksandr Sazonov
DF	(Kazakhstan) Tulken Marchaev
DF	(Kazakhstan) Bakhtiyar Kanapiev
DF	(Kazakhstan) Bekbolat Kenchimov
MF	(Kazakhstan) Takhir Kasymov
MF	(Kazakhstan) Oleg Yarygin
FW	(Kazakhstan) Aleksandr Polovnikov		(substituted in) 65'
Manager:
(Kazakhstan) Vyacheslav Khvan

Man of the match

Match rules

- 90 minutes.
- 30 minutes of extra-time if necessary.
- Penalty shoot-out if scores still level.
- Seven named substitutes.
- Maximum of three substitutions.
