= 1993 Kazakhstan Cup =

Tournament details
- Country: Kazakhstan
- Teams: 27

Final positions
- Champions: Dostyk
- Runners-up: Taraz

Tournament statistics
- Matches played: 21
- Goals scored: 62 (2.95 per match)
- Top goal scorer(s): Roman Luchkin (Dostyk) 3 Igor Butkov (Ansat) 3 Nurken Mazbaev, (Taraz) 3

The 1993 Kazakhstan Cup is the second season of the Kazakhstan Cup, the annual nationwide football cup competition of Kazakhstan since the independence of the country. The contest kicks off on March 24 and concludes with the final in November 1993. Kairat are the defending champions, having won their first cup in the 1992 competition.

== First round ==
24 March 1993	Tselinnik	0–1	Dostyk
			Gasanov

26 March 1993	Azhar	2–2 (3–5 p)	Bulat
	Lyashko; Myakishev		Fridental; Demyan

26 March 1993	Aktyubinets	0–1	Shakhter
			Pugaltsov

2 April 1993	Kairat	(w/o)	Metallist

2 April 1993	Namys	1–3	Gornyak
	D.Imankulov		Zobnin; Frolov

2 April 1993	Uralets-Arma	2–2 (4–3 p)	Vostok
	Gritsaev		Fyodorov; Duzmambetov

2 April 1993	Munaishy	1–2	Kokshetau
	Boyko		Gusev

2 April 1993	Yassi	1–0	Enbek
	Yurtaev

5 April 1993	Batyr	2–2 (3–4 p)	Taraz
	Reshetnev; Kurganskiy		Shmarikov; Mazbaev

5 April 1993	SKIF-Ordabasy	3–1	Kaisar
	Kapustnikov; Ergeshev; Sisenov		Kogay

5 April 1993	Ansat	3–1	Karachaganak
	Butkov		Sapygin

== Second round ==
6 April 1993	Dynamo Almaty	2–1	Khimik
	Grokhovskiy; Litvinenko		Malyshev

2 May 1993	Gornyak	(w/o)	Kairat

2 May 1993	Spartak Semey	(w/o)	Zhiger

2 May 1993	Ansat	(w/o)	Taldykorgan

2 May 1993	Kokshetau	2–1	Bulat
	Samoylov; Timonin		Demyan

2 May 1993	Taraz	2–0	SKIF-Ordabasy
	Mirsalimbayev; Musataev (o.g.)

2 May 1993	Shakhter	6–0	Yassi
	R.Imankulov; Yegorov; Manyuk; Kravchenko; Zhuravlyov

25 May 1993	Dostyk	3–1	Uralets-Arma
	Doskeev; Shanin; Klimov		Konovalov

== Quarter-finals ==
11 June 1993	Taraz	3–0	Shakhter
	Yarygin; Mirsalimbayev; Mazbaev		Malyshev

11 June 1993	Spartak Semey	0–0 (3–4 p)	Ansat

20 Jule 1993	Dostyk	(w/o)	Kokshetau

20 Jule 1993	Gornyak	0–1	Dynamo Almaty
			Niyazymbetov

== Semi-finals ==
20 Jule 1993	Taraz	1–0	Ansat
	Mazbaev

8 August 1993	Dynamo Almaty	1–2	Dostyk
	Niyazymbetov		Akhunov; Klimov

== Final ==
8 November 1993

Dostyk	4–2	Taraz
Luchkin 30' 43' 70'; Shanin 65'		Shmarikov 40'; Avdeev 49'

Central Stadium, Almaty
Referee: Sergei Borodin (Karagandy)
