= 2008 Kazakhstan Premier League =

Sports season

Kazakhstan Premier League
- Season: 2008
- Champions: Aktobe
- Champions League: Aktobe
- UEFA Cup: Tobol; Irtysh Pavlodar; Okzhetpes
- Top goalscorer: Alexandru Golban (13); Murat Tleshev (13)

The 2008 Kazakhstan Premier League was the 17th season of the Kazakhstan Premier League, the highest football league competition in Kazakhstan, and took place between 8 March and 5 November.

== Teams ==
For the 2007 season, Megasport and Energetik were promoted to the Premier League, replacing Taraz and Ekibastuzets, who had been thrown out of the league for Match fixing,

=== Team overview ===
Locations of teams in the 2008 Kazakhstan Premier League

Team	Manager	Location	Venue	Capacity
Aktobe	(Russia) Vladimir Mukhanov	Aktobe	Central Stadium	13,200
Almaty	(Germany) Bernd Storck	Almaty	Central Stadium	23,804
Astana	(Kazakhstan) Vyacheslav Ledovskih	Astana	Kazhymukan Munaitpasov Stadium	12,350
Atyrau	(Russia) Sergey Andreyev	Atyrau	Munaishy Stadium	9,500
Energetic-2	(Kazakhstan) Vladimir Linchevskiy	Ekibastuz	Shakhter	6,300
Esil Bogatyr	(Kazakhstan) Evgeny Yarovenko	Petropavl	Karasai Stadium	11,000
Irtysh	(Kazakhstan) Oirat Saduov	Pavlodar	Central Stadium	15,000
Kairat	(Kazakhstan) Vakhid Masudov	Almaty	Central Stadium	23,804
Kaisar	(Kazakhstan) Vladimir Nikitenko	Kyzylorda	Gani Muratbayev Stadium	7,000
Megasport	(Kazakhstan) Vladimir Gulyamkhaidarov	Almaty	Central Stadium	23,804
Okzhetpes	(Kazakhstan) Viktor Rymar	Kokshetau	Okzhetpes Stadium	4,158
Ordabasy	(Serbia) Jovica Nikolić	Shymkent	Kazhimukan Munaitpasov Stadium	20,000
Shakhter Karagandy	(Kazakhstan) Ivan Azovskiy	Karagandy	Shakhter Stadium	20,000
Tobol	(Kazakhstan) Dmitriy Ogai	Kostanay	Central Stadium	8,323
Vostok	(Ukraine) Oleksandr Holokolosov	Oskemen	Vostok Stadium	8,500
Zhetysu	(Moldova) Ilie Karp	Taldykorgan	Zhetysu Stadium	4,000

=== Managerial changes ===
Team	Outgoing manager	Manner of departure	Incoming manager
Almaty	(Netherlands) Marco Bragonje	Sacked	(Germany) Bernd Storck
Astana	(Russia) Aleksandr Irkhin	Sacked	(Kazakhstan) Vyacheslav Ledovskih
Atyrau	(Kazakhstan) Sergei Volgin	Sacked	(Russia) Sergey Andreyev
Energetik-2	(Kazakhstan) Valeriy Zhuravlev	Mutual consent	(Kazakhstan) Vladimir Linchevskiy
Megasport	(Kazakhstan) Ravil Ramazanov	Mutual consent	(Kazakhstan) Vladimir Gulyamkhaidarov
Okzhetpes	(Kazakhstan) Vyacheslav Ledovskih	Signed by Astana	(Kazakhstan) Viktor Rymar
Ordabasy	(Kazakhstan) Bauyrzhan Baimukhammedov	Mutual consent	(Serbia) Jovica Nikolić
Shakhter Karagandy	(Georgia (country)) Revaz Dzodzuashvili	Mutual consent	(Kazakhstan) Ivan Azovskiy (caretaker)
Zhetysu	(Kazakhstan) Eduard Glazunov	Mutual consent	(Moldova) Ilie Karp

== League table ==
Pos	Team	Pld	W	D	L	GF	GA	GD	Pts	Qualification or relegation
1	Aktobe (C)	30	20	7	3	61	18	+43	67 (Note: Championship was decided in a decision game.)	Qualification for the Champions League second qualifying round
2	Tobol	30	20	7	3	58	21	+37	67	Qualification for the Europa League second qualifying round
3	Irtysh Pavlodar	30	18	8	4	58	28	+30	62	Qualification for the Europa League first qualifying round
4	Kaisar	30	13	10	7	29	22	+7	49	
5	Megasport (Note: Alma-Ata declared their withdrawal from the league in December 2008. As a consequence, Atyrau were spared from relegation. Subsequently, Alma-Ata and Megasport officials announced that the two clubs have merged to a new team called "Lokomotiv" and expressed their will to move to Astana. Lokomotiv also inherited Alma-Ata's 2009–10 UEFA Europa League spot earned through Kazakhstan Cup 2008. However, Lokomotiv were eventually denied the UEFA License for competing in Europa League due to legal difficulties when creating the new club. Thereby, the potential candidates for one spot left in Europa League were Kaisar, Zhetysu, Shakhter and Okzhetpes. Kaisar and Shakhter were, however, denied a license and Zhetysu eventually withdrew from Europe due to financial difficulties. That left Okzhetpes as the third Europa League participant from Kazakhstan.) (D)	30	12	6	12	33	38	−5	42	Withdrew from the league, dissolved and merged
6	Zhetysu	30	11	8	11	28	27	+1	41	
7	Shakhter Karagandy (Note: On 2 October 2008, the FFK revisited their decisions upon Shakhter and Vostok for playing a fixed match from 16 September 2008. Shakhter were docked nine points while Vostok were immediately expelled from the competition. The result of the game in question has been cancelled and all remaining Vostok games were counted as won by 3–0 for their opponents. The expulsion of Vostok from Kazakhstan Cup 2008 has been revoked.)	29	11	13	5	41	26	+15	37	
8	Alma-Ata (D)	30	10	7	13	33	39	−6	37	Withdrew from the league, dissolved and merged
9	Okzhetpes	30	10	5	15	32	48	−16	35	Qualification for the Europa League first qualifying round
10	Kairat (Note: Kairat were docked three points for not paying back existing debts in a timely manner.) (D, R)	30	9	10	11	25	28	−3	34	Relegation to the Kazakhstan First Division (Note: On 20 January 2009, Kairat handed a letter to the FFK citing they will voluntarily withdraw from the Kazakhstan Premier League due to financial reasons. They are eligible for competing in the First Division.)
11	Astana (Note: Astana were docked three points for not paying transfer money to Okzhetpes and Alma-Ata, and for not paying salary to former manager Aleksandr Irkhin.) (D, R)	30	8	11	11	37	33	+4	32	Relegation to the Kazakhstan First Division (Note: On 20 January 2009, Astana withdrew from 2009 season due to unpaid debts. They do not compete on a professional level, but keep their youth academy.)
12	Ordabasy	30	7	9	14	25	44	−19	30	
13	Esil Bogatyr	30	4	12	14	21	42	−21	24 (Note: On 16 November 2008 FFK board decided not to change the competition format for the 2009 season, what meant that it would feature the same number of teams (16). Since there were four teams originally scheduled to be relegated at the end of the season, the board decided to save from relegation Esil Bogatyr (due to higher number of points) and Vostok (due to importance of the team for the development of football in the East region of Kazakhstan). However, after two withdrawals the 2009 season features 14 teams.)	
14	Energetik-2 (D, R)	30	5	8	17	21	43	−22	23	Relegation to the Kazakhstan First Division
15	Atyrau	30	3	10	17	22	54	−32	19	
—	Vostok (T)	29	10	5	14	35	48	−13	35	Expelled and disqualified and excluded and withdrawn from the league, but later reinstated

Source: kff.kz (in Russian)
Rules for classification: 1st points; 2nd overall wins; 3rd goal difference; 4th goals scored
(C) Champions; (D) Disqualified; (R) Relegated; (T) Qualified, but not yet for the particular phase indicated

=== Play-off match ===
Because Aktobe and Tobol were tied on points and number of wins after the regular season, they played out the championship in a decision game.

20 November 2008
19:00 GMT+6

Aktobe	1 – 1 (aet)	Tobol
Smakov 69' (pen.)	Report (in Russian)	Golban 49'
Penalties
	4 – 2

Central Stadium, Almaty
Attendance: 16,000
Referee: Khisamutdinov (Pavlodar)

== Results ==
Home \ Away	AKT	ALM	AST	ATY	ENE	ESB	IRT	KRT	KSR	MEG	OKZ	ORD	SHA	TOB	VOS	ZHE
Aktobe		3–0	3–1	3–0	1–1	2–1	3–3	3–0	1–0	1–0	1–0	5–1	3–0	1–1	3–0	3–0
Almaty	0–1		2–1	2–1	1–0	1–1	2–2	1–0	0–1	3–1	4–1	1–2	3–3	1–3	0–1	2–2
Astana	1–0	3–0		7–1	3–2	1–2	1–1	2–1	0–0	0–1	3–1	2–0	2–3	0–1	0–0	0–0
Atyrau	2–4	3–1	0–0		0–0	2–0	1–2	2–2	0–0	2–3	0–0	0–2	2–2	0–5	1–4	1–0
Energetik-2	2–4	1–3	2–1	1–0		0–0	1–1	0–0	0–1	0–1	3–1	2–1	1–1	0–1	1–2	0–0
Esil Bogatyr	1–1	0–1	0–0	2–2	0–0		0–1	2–1	0–0	0–2	2–2	1–1	0–0	0–2	2–1	0–1
Irtysh Pavlodar	0–0	1–0	5–2	3–0	3–0	3–0		3–1	2–1	4–0	2–1	4–0	2–2	1–1	2–3	1–0
Kairat	0–1	1–0	0–0	1–0	1–0	0–0	1–0		1–1	1–0	2–1	3–0	0–0	1–1	3–0 (Note: The games have been counted as lost with a score of 3–0 for Vostok because of their participation in a fixed game with Shakhter.)	3–1
Kaisar	0–0	0–0	1–1	1–0	4–0	1–0	0–1	0–0		2–0	1–2	1–0	1–0	3–2	2–1	2–1
Megasport	0–3	0–1	0–3 (Note: The games Megasport vs. Zhetysu (Round 1, 2–1) and Megasport vs. Astana (Round 2, 0–0) were awarded against Megasport because they fielded two ineligible players.)	0–0	2–1	1–0	1–1	1–0	0–1		5–0	0–1	1–0	2–2	3–0	0–3
Okzhetpes	0–3 (Note: The games Okzhetpes vs. Vostok (Round 1, 1–1), Okzhetpes vs. Aktobe (Round 2, 2–2) and Shakhter vs. Okzhetpes (Round 3, 2–1) were awarded against Okzhetpes because of unknown reasons.)	0–2	2–1	3–2	2–1	2–0	0–1	2–0	1–1	2–0		2–1	0–1	1–1	0–3	2–0
Ordabasy	1–4	0–0	1–0	0–0	2–1	0–2	0–1	1–0	0–2	2–2	1–1		0–0	1–2	1–2	0–0
Shakhter Karagandy	0–0	1–1	1–1	2–0	0–1	3–1	3–1	3–0	5–0	2–2	3–0	2–1		1–0	XXX (Note: The result of the game (Shakhter 2–1 Vostok) has been discarded.)	1–0
Tobol	1–0	2–1	2–0	3–0	3–0	2–1	2–1	2–1	1–1	6–1	2–0	1–1	2–1		3–0	2–0
Vostok	0–3	2–0	0–3	0–0	1–0	8–2	0–3	0–0	2–1	1–2	0–3	3–3	1–1	0–2		0–3
Zhetysu	2–1	2–0	1–1	1–0	3–0	1–1	2–3	1–1	1–0	1–0	2–0	0–1	0–0	1–0	1–0	

Source: kff.kz (in Russian)
Legend: Blue = home team win; Yellow = draw; Red = away team win.

== Season statistics ==
=== Top scorers ===
As of match played 5 November 2008

Rank	Player	Club	Goals
1	(Moldova) Alexandru Golban	Tobol	13
1	(Kazakhstan) Murat Tleshev	Irtysh	13
3	(Kazakhstan) Nurbol Zhumaskaliyev	Tobol	12
4	(Kazakhstan) Marat Khairullin	Aktobe	11
5	(Bulgaria) Georgi Daskalov	Irtysh	10
5	(Kazakhstan) Maksat Baizhanov	Kaisar	10
5	(Russia) Aleksandr Savin	Astana	10
