= Vladimir Gulyamkhaydarov =

Soviet footballer (1946–2026)

Personal information
- Full name: Vladimir Alekseyevich Gulyamkhaydarov
- Date of birth: 26 February 1946
- Place of birth: Stalinabad, Tajik SSR, Soviet Union
- Date of death: 15 June 2026 (aged 80)
- Height: 1.73 m (5 ft 8 in)
- Position: Midfielder

Senior career*
Years	Team	Apps	(Gls)
1964–1968	Pamir Dushanbe	156	(11)
1969–1970	Torpedo Moscow	19	(3)
1971–1977	Pamir Dushanbe	241	(30)
1991	Vakhsh Qurghonteppa	2	(0)

Managerial career
- 1982–1983: Pamir Dushanbe
- 1984: Vakhsh Qurghonteppa
- 1986–1991: Pamir Dushanbe
- 1994: Tajikistan
- 1996: Ekibastuzets
- 2003: Kairat
- 2003: Taraz
- 2008: Megasport
- * Club domestic league appearances and goals

Vladimir Alekseyevich Gulyamkhaydarov (Russian: Владимир Алексеевич Гулямхайдаров, Tajik: Воҳид Ғуломҳайдаров; 26 February 1946 – 15 June 2026) was a Tajikistani football player and coach.

== Managerial career ==
In 1994, Gulyamkhaydarov was appointed the head coach of Tajikistan.

In 1996, he was appointed the manager of FC Ekibastuzets in the Kazakhstan Premier League. Gulyamkhaydarov coached Kairat between 1999 and 2003, where he was also the manager for a short period in 2003. After leaving Kairat, Gulyamkhaydarov became the coach of FC Taraz for the remainder of the 2003 season. He coached Kairat between 2004 and 2005, and then FC Zhetysu in 2006. In June 2008, Gulyamkhaydarov was appointed manager of newly promoted Kazakhstan Premier League side Megasport. In 2009, he coached Astana before becoming a coach and consultant to FC Sunkar in 2012.

== Death ==
Gulyamkhaydarov died on 15 June 2026, at the age of 80.
