= 1999 Kazakhstan Premier League =

Kazakhstan Top Division
- Season: 1999
- Champions: Irtysh-Bastau
- Asian Club Championship: Irtysh-Bastau
- Asian Cup Winners' Cup: Kairat
- Matches: 240
- Goals: 631 (2.63 per match)
- Top goalscorer: Rejepmyrat Agabaýew (24)

The 1999 Kazakhstan Top Division was the eighth season of the Top Division, now called the Kazakhstan Premier League, the highest football league competition in Kazakhstan.

== Teams ==
Following the conclusion of the previous season, Nasha Kompaniya, Bolat and Naryn were relegated, with Tobol, Access-Esil, Zhetysu, Sintez and Kairat being promoted in their place. Prior to the start of the season, Irtysh Pavlodar became Irtysh-Bastau, Astana became Zhenis Astana, Khimik became Akmola, Tomiris became Sintez and Vostok became Vostok Altyn.

=== Team overview ===
Locations of teams in the 1999 Kazakhstan Premier League

Team	Location	Venue	Capacity
Access-Esil	Petropavl	Karasai Stadium	
Akmola	Stepnogorsk		
Batyr	Ekibastuz	Shakhtyor Stadium	
CSKA Almaty	Almaty	CSKA Stadium	
Irtysh-Bastau	Pavlodar	Central Stadium	
Kairat	Almaty	Central Stadium	
Kaisar-Hurricane	Kyzylorda	Gani Muratbayev Stadium	
Shakhter-Ispat-Karmet	Karaganda	Shakhter Stadium	
Sintez	Shymkent	Kazhymukan Munaitpasov Stadium	
Taraz	Taraz	Central Stadium	
Tobol	Kostanay	Central Stadium	
Vostok-Altyn	Oskemen	Vostok Stadium	
Yelimay	Semey	Spartak Stadium	
Zhenis Astana	Astana	Kazhymukan Munaitpasov Stadium	
Zhetysu	Taldykorgan	Zhetysu Stadium	
Zhiger	Shymkent	Kazhymukan Munaitpasov Stadium	

== League table ==
Pos	Team	Pld	W	D	L	GF	GA	GD	Pts	Qualification
1	Irtysh Pavlodar (C)	30	24	4	2	69	19	+50	76	Qualification for the Asian Club Championship
2	Access-Esil	30	23	3	4	56	19	+37	72	
3	Kairat	30	21	1	8	62	19	+43	64	Qualification for the Asian Cup Winners' Cup
4	Zhenis Astana	30	18	5	7	60	25	+35	59	
5	Kaisar-Hurricane	30	17	7	6	47	19	+28	58	
6	Sintez	30	17	5	8	48	31	+17	56	
7	Vostok Altyn	30	14	4	12	32	33	−1	46	
8	Tobol	30	12	5	13	28	29	−1	41	
9	Yelimay	30	12	4	14	35	36	−1	40	
10	Shakhter-Ispat-Karmet	30	11	4	15	28	35	−7	37	
11	Batyr	30	11	1	18	36	54	−18	34	
12	CSKA Kairat	30	9	4	17	35	52	−17	31	
13	Zhiger	30	8	4	18	33	60	−27	28	
14	Taraz	30	6	5	19	25	64	−39	23	
15	Zhetysu (Note: Zhetysu and Akmola were initially relegated, but were later re-accepted to the league)	30	3	4	23	18	68	−50	13	
16	Akmola	30	2	4	24	19	68	−49	10	

Source: kpfl.kz
Rules for classification: 1) points; 2) goal difference; 3) number of goals scored.
(C) Champions

== Results ==
Home \ Away	ACS	AKM	BAT	CSK	IRT	KRT	KSR	SHA	SIN	TAR	TOB	VOS	YEL	ZHN	ZHE	ZHI
Access-Esil		1–0	3–1	1–0	1–1	2–0	2–1	1–0	2–0	7–2	1–0	3–0	3–0	2–1	2–0	2–0
Akmola	0–3		2–0	1–1	1–2	0–5	1–4	2–0	1–3	0–0	0–1	1–1	1–2	2–3	1–1	0–3
Batyr	1–3	4–1		2–0	0–1	0–3	3–1	0–1	2–1	3–1	2–0	0–1	1–3	2–0	2–1	1–0
CSKA Kairat	1–1	3–0	2–1		0–2	0–2	1–2	1–2	1–1	4–1	1–2	0–2	3–1	0–4	5–2	4–0
Irtysh Pavlodar	1–0	4–0	4–1	5–0		1–0	2–0	2–1	2–1	2–0	3–0	5–2	3–2	3–0	6–1	2–1
Kayrat	1–2	4–0	5–0	0–1	1–2		2–1	2–0	2–0	1–0	2–0	1–0	3–1	1–0	3–0	2–0
Kaisar–Hurricane	3–0	3–2	1–0	2–0	0–0	0–0		1–1	0–1	6–1	2–0	2–0	0–0	0–0	4–0	3–0
Shakhter-Ispat-Karmet	0–1	2–1	2–1	0–1	1–2	2–1	0–1		0–1	1–0	1–0	2–0	1–1	0–0	3–0	3–1
Sintez	1–2	4–0	3–2	2–2	2–2	0–2	1–1	3–0		1–0	3–1	2–0	3–0	0–0	2–0	5–2
Taraz	0–1	3–0	2–1	4–2	0–0	1–3	0–3	2–1	0–2		1–1	0–2	1–1	0–1	3–1	5–1
Tobol	2–0	3–0 (Note: Match awarded.)	0–1	1–0	1–0	1–0	0–0	2–0	0–1	3–0		0–0	1–0	1–1	2–0	0–0
Vostok Altyn	1–1	1–0	1–0	2–0	1–4	2–3	2–1	2–0	0–1	1–0	1–0		0–0	3–0	1–2	4–0
Yelimay	1–0	2–1	6–1	1–0	1–4	0–2	0–1	0–1	3–1	3–0	1–2	1–0		0–1	2–0	2–1
Zhenis Astana	1–2	2–0	4–1	6–0	1–0	2–1	0–2	2–1	3–0	7–0	3–1	3–0	1–0		1–0	7–2
Zhetysu	0–1	3–2	1–2	0–1	0–2	0–4	0–1	1–1	0–2	1–1	2–0	0–2	0–2	1–4		1–1
Zhiger	0–6	1–0	1–1	2–1	0–2	1–5	0–1	3–1	0–1	5–1	3–2	0–1	1–0	1–1	4–0	

Legend: Blue = home team win; Yellow = draw; Red = away team win.

== Statistics ==
=== Top scorers ===
Rank	Player	Club	Goals
1	(Turkmenistan) Rejepmyrat Agabaýew	Kairat	24
2	(Kazakhstan) Viktor Zubarev	Irtysh-Bastau	22
3	(Kazakhstan) Nurken Mazbaev	Sintez/Kaisar-Hurricane	15
4	(Russia) Vitaliy Razdrogin	Zhenis	14
5	(Kazakhstan) Igor Avdeyev	Access-Esil	13
5	(Kazakhstan) Seitzhan Baibossynov	Zhiger	13
5	(Brazil) Mendes	Irtysh-Bastau	13
8	(Kazakhstan) Aleksandr Miroshnichenko	Irtysh-Bastau/Yelimay	11
8	(Kazakhstan) Bolat Esmagambetov	Access-Esil	11
10	(Kazakhstan) Dmitriy Galich	Sintez	10
