= Nilton Mendes =

Brazilian footballer

- Mendes with FC Zhenis

Personal information
- Full name: Nilton Pereira Mendes
- Date of birth: January 7, 1976
- Place of birth: Governador Valadares, Brazil
- Date of death: September 18, 2006 (aged 30)
- Place of death: Karagandy, Kazakhstan
- Height: 1.80 m (5 ft 11 in)
- Position: Striker

Youth career
- Atlético Mineiro
- Internacional

Senior career*
Years	Team	Apps	(Gls)
1998	Zhemchuzhina Sochi	25	(2)
1999–2001	Irtysh Pavlodar	76	(43)
2002–2004	Zhenis Astana	71	(20)
2004	Shakhter Karagandy	16	(6)
2005	Zhenis Astana	26	(7)
2006	Shakhter Karagandy	11	(3)
Total		225	(81)
- * Club domestic league appearances and goals

Nilton Pereira Mendes or simply Mendes (January 7, 1976 – September 18, 2006) was a Brazilian professional footballer. He was born in Governador Valadares.

== Death ==
Mendes collapsed on the pitch during a training match for his club FC Shakhter Karagandy and died on the way to the hospital at Karagandy.

== Honours ==
=== Club ===
Irtysh

- Kazakhstan Premier League winner (1): 1999.
- Kazakhstan Premier League bronze (1): 2000.

Astana-1964

- Kazakhstan Premier League bronze (1): 2003.
- Kazakhstan Cup winner (2): 2002, 2005
- Kazakhstan Cup runner-up (1): 2001

=== Individual ===
- Kazakhstan Premier League top scorer: 2000 (21 goals).
- Kazakhstan Premier League best foreign player: 2002.

== See also ==
- List of association footballers who died while playing
