= Nurmat Mirzabayev =

Kazakhstani footballer

Nurmat Mirzabaev
Personal information
- Full name: Nurmat Mirzabaev
- Date of birth: 11 November 1972 (age 53)
- Place of birth: Kazakh SSR, Soviet Union
- Height: 1.79 m (5 ft 10 1/2 in)
- Position: Defender

Senior career*
Years	Team	Apps	(Gls)
1994–1997	Taraz		
1998	Irtysh Pavlodar		
1999–2000	Access-Esil		
2001	Yesil-Bogatyr		
2002	Irtysh Pavlodar		
2003	Aktobe		
2004–2005	Taraz		

International career^{‡}
1998–2003	Kazakhstan	16	(1)

Managerial career
- 2013: FC Taraz (interim)
- 2016: FC Taraz
- 2022: FC Taraz
- * Club domestic league appearances and goals as of 11 June 2008 ‡ National team caps and goals as of 11 June 2008

Nurmat Mirzabaev (Kazakh: Nurmat Narmanuly Myrzabaev, born 11 November 1972) is a retired football defender from Kazakhstan. He obtained a total number of sixteen caps for the Kazakhstan national football team during his career, scoring one goal.
