= 2009 Kazakhstan Cup =

Tournament details
- Country: Kazakhstan

Final positions
- Champions: Atyrau
- Runners-up: Shakhter

The 2010 Kazakhstan Cup was the 18th season of the Kazakhstan Cup, the annual nationwide football cup competition of Kazakhstan since the independence of the country. The competition started on 24 April 2009 and ended on 15 November 2009. In the final, Atyrau beat Shakhter to win its first cup and earn a place in the second qualifying round of the 2010–11 UEFA Europa League.

== Round 1 ==
All 28 teams from both the Premier League and First Division entered in this round. The draw was conducted on 26 March 2009 at the offices of the Football Federation of Kazakhstan. For every match, one First Division team was drawn against one Premier League team, with the First Division team assigned as the home team. The exception was a match between Shakhter and Ekibastuzets which was played at Shakhter's pitch due to insufficient pitch conditions in Ekibastuz. The matches were played on 24 and 25 April 2009.

Team 1	Score	Team 2
Shakhter	3–1	Ekibastuzets
Aktobe-Zhas	0–3	Kaisar
Akzhayik	2–3	Atyrau
Turkestan	0–4	Taraz
Gefest	0-2	Lokomotiv
Bolat	0–5	Kazakhmys
Caspiy	1–5	Aktobe
Karasay Sarbazdary	0–1	Tobol
Ile-Saulet	0–2	Vostok
Spartak	1–4	Irtysh
Aizharyk	1–2	Zhetysu
Kairat	0–1	Kyzylzhar
OSSHIOSD Taraz	1–2	Ordabasy
Namys	0–0 (aet, p. 4–5)	Okzhetpes

== Round 2 ==
The draw was conducted on 29 April 2009 at the offices of the Kazakh Football Federation. The fourteen winners of Round 1 were drawn into six matches. Thereby, Zhetysu and Atyrau received a bye. The first legs were played on 20 May 2009 while the second legs were played on 23 June 2009.

Team 1	Agg.	Team 2	1st leg	2nd leg
Vostok	4–2	Kyzylzhar	0–1	4–1
Irtysh	3–1	Ordabasy	3–0	0–1
Shakhter	9–2	Okzhetpes	4–1	5–1
Aktobe	2–2 (a)	Lokomotiv	1–0	1–2
Kazakhmys	1–5	Kaisar	1–3	0–2
Taraz	3–3 (a)	Tobol	1–1	2–2

== Quarterfinals ==
The draw was conducted on 27 July 2009 at the offices of the Kazakh Football Federation. The first leg was played on 27 August 2009 while the second legs was played on 3 October 2009.

Team 1	Agg.	Team 2	1st leg	2nd leg
Taraz	0–2	Zhetysu	0–1	0–1
Kaisar	0–5	Atyrau	0–1	0–4
Aktobe	6–1	Vostok	2–1	4–0
Irtysh	1–4	Shakhter	1–1	0–3

== Semifinals ==
The draw was conducted on 21 October 2009 at the offices of the Kazakh Football Federation. The first legs were played on 7 November 2009 while the second legs were played on 11 November 2009.

Team 1	Agg.	Team 2	1st leg	2nd leg
Zhetysu	1–4	Atyrau	0–2	1–2
Aktobe	1–2	Shakhter	1–0	0–2 (aet)

== Final ==
The final was played on 15 November 2009 in the capital city Astana, in the Astana Arena Stadium.

15 November 2009
TBA UTC+6

Atyrau	1 – 0	Shakhter

Astana Arena, Astana
