= 1997 Kazakhstan Premier League =

Sports season

Kazakhstan Top Division
- Season: 1997
- Champions: Irtysh Pavlodar
- Relegated: Aktobe; Ulytau
- Asian Club Championship: Irtysh Pavlodar
- Asian Cup Winners' Cup: Kaisar-Hurricane
- Matches: 182
- Goals: 462 (2.54 per match)
- Top goalscorer: Nurken Mazbaev (16)

The 1997 Kazakhstan Top Division was the sixth season of the Top Division, now called the Kazakhstan Premier League, the highest football league competition in Kazakhstan.

== Teams ==
Following the conclusion of the previous season, no teams were promoted or relegated. However Tobol, Munaishy, Kainar and SKIF-Ordabasy all withdrew from the league prior to the start of the season due to financial reasons.

Before the 1997 season started, Kokshe became Avtomobilist, Metallist became Ulytau, Aktobemunai became Aktobe, Tselinnik Akmola became Astana, Shakhter Karagandy became Shakhter-Ispat-Karmet and Vostok became Vostok Adil. Kaisar-Munai became Kaisar-Hurricane half-way through the season, in July.

=== Team overview ===
Locations of teams in the 1997 Kazakhstan Premier League

Team	Location	Venue	Capacity
Aktobe	Aktobe	Central Stadium	
Astana	Astana	Kazhymukan Munaitpasov Stadium	
Avtomobilist	Kokshetau	Torpedo Stadium	
Batyr	Ekibastuz	Shakhtyor Stadium	
Bolat	Temirtau	Metallurg Stadium	
Irtysh Pavlodar	Pavlodar	Central Stadium	
Kairat	Almaty	Central Stadium	
Kaisar-Hurricane	Kyzylorda	Gani Muratbayev Stadium	
Shakhter-Ispat-Karmet	Karaganda	Shakhter Stadium	
Taraz	Taraz	Central Stadium	
Ulytau	Jezkazgan		
Vostok	Oskemen	Vostok Stadium	
Yelimay	Semey	Spartak Stadium	
Zhiger	Shymkent	Kazhymukan Munaitpasov Stadium	

== League table ==
Pos	Team	Pld	W	D	L	GF	GA	GD	Pts	Qualification or relegation
1	Irtysh Pavlodar (C)	26	17	5	4	46	15	+31	56 (Note: Championship was decided in a decision game.)	Qualification for the Asian Club Championship
2	Taraz	26	18	2	6	49	18	+31	56	
3	Kairat	26	16	5	5	52	14	+38	53	
4	Shakhter-Ispat-Karmet	26	16	4	6	40	22	+18	52	
5	Vostok Adil	26	14	8	4	42	16	+26	50	
6	Batyr	26	15	2	9	38	22	+16	47	
7	Yelimay	26	13	7	6	41	26	+15	46	
8	Kaisar-Hurricane	26	13	5	8	39	23	+16	44	Qualification for the Asian Cup Winners' Cup
9	Astana	26	11	4	11	32	21	+11	37	
10	Zhiger	26	8	5	13	27	40	−13	29	
11	Avtomobilist	26	5	0	21	23	68	−45	15	
12	Aktobe (R)	26	4	3	19	16	56	−40	15	Relegation to the Kazakhstan First Division
13	Bolat	26	3	5	18	13	47	−34	14	
14	Ulytau (R)	26	1	1	24	4	74	−70	4	Relegation to the Kazakhstan First Division

Source: kpfl.kz
Rules for classification: 1) points; 2) goal difference; 3) number of goals scored.
(C) Champions; (R) Relegated

=== Golden match ===
13 October 1997

Irtysh Pavlodar	1–0	Taraz
Viktor Antonov 54'

Central Stadium, Almaty
Attendance: 7,500
Referee: A.Kulakov

== Results ==
Home \ Away	AKT	AST	AVT	BAT	BOL	IRT	KRT	KSR	SHA	TAR	ULY	VOS	YEL	ZHI
Aktobe		0–3 (Note: As Aktobe withdrew after 21 games, the remaining 5 games were turned into a 0–3 win for the opponents.)	0–3	0–1	2–1	0–4	0–2	0–3	1–2	0–2	3–0 (Note: As Ulytau withdrew after 14 games, the remaining 12 games were turned into a 0–3 win for the opponents.)	1–1	0–0	0–0
Astana	2–0		5–1	2–3	0–0	0–0	0–1	3–0	0–1	1–0	3–0	2–0	2–0	3–1
Avtomobilist	1–0	0–1		0–2	1–0	1–4	2–4	0–1	0–3	0–1	3–0	0–5	2–4	3–4
Batyr	2–0	1–0	5–0		3–0	1–2	0–2	1–0	3–0	1–3	1–0	0–2	1–0	2–0
Bolat	0–2	1–1	1–0	2–3		0–2	0–1	1–1	1–4	0–1	3–0	0–0	0–3	0–0
Irtysh Pavlodar	1–0	0–0	3–0	2–1	5–1		1–0	1–0	1–0	1–0	5–1	2–0	1–1	4–1
Kairat	7–0	3–0	3–0	0–1	4–0	0–0		1–1	2–0	1–0	7–0	1–1	1–2	3–0
Kaisar-Hurricane	1–0	0–0	3–2	1–0	3–0	1–0	1–3		3–0	1–2	3–0	0–0	2–0	3–1
Shakhter-Ispat-Karmet	3–0	1–0	3–0	1–0	2–0	2–1	1–2	3–2		2–0	1–0	1–1	3–0	2–0
Taraz	9–1	2–0	5–0	1–0	2–0	1–1	0–0	2–1	3–0		3–0	1–0	3–1	1–0
Ulytau	0–5	0–3	0–3	0–3	0–1	0–3	0–3	0–4	0–3	1–3		0–0	0–1	2–1
Vostok Adil	3–0	1–0	8–0	2–1	2–1	1–0	2–0	1–0	1–1	2–1	3–0		0–0	3–1
Yelimay	3–0	2–1	1–0	2–2	4–0	3–1	1–1	1–1	0–0	4–2	3–0	1–0		3–1
Zhiger	2–1	2–0	2–1	0–0	1–0	0–0	1–0	1–3	1–2	0–1	3–0	2–3	2–1	

Legend: Blue = home team win; Yellow = draw; Red = away team win.

== Statistics ==
=== Top scorers ===
Rank	Player	Club	Goals
1	(Kazakhstan) Nurken Mazbaev	Taraz	16
2	(Kazakhstan) Vladimir Loginov	Kaisar-Hurricane	12
3	(Kazakhstan) Viktor Zubarev	Irtysh	10
3	(Kazakhstan) Ruslan Duzmambetov	Vostok-Adil	10
5	(Kazakhstan) Bolat Esmagambetov	Yelimay/Irtysh	9
6	(Kazakhstan) Ruslan Imankulov	Shakhter-Ispat-Karmet	8
6	(Kazakhstan) Oleg Litvinenko	Yelimay	8
6	(Kazakhstan) Faizulla Ordabaev	Shakhter-Ispat-Karmet	8
9	(Kazakhstan) Eduard Glazunov	Batyr	7
9	(Kazakhstan) Yuri Zvonarenko	Batyr	7

== See also ==
- Kazakhstan national football team 1997
