= 1998 Kazakhstan Premier League =

Kazakhstan Top Division
- Season: 1998
- Champions: Yelimay
- Relegated: Nasha Kampaniya; Bolat; Naryn
- Asian Club Championship: Irtysh Pavlodar
- Asian Cup Winners' Cup: Kaisar-Hurricane
- Matches played: 182
- Goals scored: 486 (2.67 per match)
- Top goalscorer: Oleg Litvinenko (14)

The 1998 Kazakhstan Top Division was the seventh season of the Top Division, now called the Kazakhstan Premier League, the highest football league competition in Kazakhstan.

== Teams ==
Following the conclusion of the previous season, Aktobe and Ulytau were relegated, with Nasha Kampaniya and Naryn being promoted in their place. Prior to the start of the season, Kairat were replaced by CSKA Kairat and Avtomobilist were renamed Khimik following their move to Stepnogorsk.

=== Team overview ===
Locations of teams in the 1998 Kazakhstan Premier League

Team	Location	Venue	Capacity
Astana	Astana	Kazhymukan Munaitpasov Stadium	
Batyr	Ekibastuz	Shakhtyor Stadium	
Bolat	Temirtau	Metallurg Stadium	
CSKA Almaty	Almaty	CSKA Stadium	
Irtysh Pavlodar	Pavlodar	Central Stadium	
Kaisar-Hurricane	Kyzylorda	Gani Muratbayev Stadium	
Khimik	Stepnogorsk		
Naryn	Oral	Petr Atoyan Stadium	
Nasha Kampaniya	Astana	Locomotive Stadium	
Shakhter-Ispat-Karmet	Karaganda	Shakhter Stadium	
Taraz	Taraz	Central Stadium	
Vostok	Oskemen	Vostok Stadium	
Yelimay	Semey	Spartak Stadium	
Zhiger	Shymkent	Kazhymukan Munaitpasov Stadium	

== League table ==
Pos	Team	Pld	W	D	L	GF	GA	GD	Pts	Qualification or relegation
1	Yelimay (C)	26	20	3	3	60	20	+40	63	
2	Batyr	26	18	5	3	50	17	+33	59	
3	Irtysh Pavlodar	26	17	6	3	44	15	+29	57	Qualification for the Asian Club Championship
4	Kaisar-Hurricane	26	16	5	5	42	17	+25	53	Qualification for the Asian Cup Winners' Cup
5	Vostok	26	17	1	8	49	25	+24	52	
6	Astana	26	15	6	5	45	22	+23	51	
7	CSKA Kairat	26	13	4	9	45	32	+13	43	
8	Khimik	26	7	8	11	22	33	−11	29	
9	Shakhter-Ispat-Karmet	26	8	4	14	29	32	−3	28	
10	Taraz	26	7	6	13	33	35	−2	27	
11	Zhiger	26	6	4	16	31	49	−18	22	
12	Nasha Kampaniya (R)	26	3	6	17	15	50	−35	15	Relegation to the Kazakhstan First Division
13	Bolat (R)	26	3	3	20	10	60	−50	12	Relegation to the Kazakhstan First Division
14	Naryn (R)	26	0	3	23	11	73	−62	3	Relegation to the Kazakhstan First Division

Source: kpfl.kz
Rules for classification: 1) points; 2) goal difference; 3) number of goals scored.
(C) Champions; (R) Relegated

== Results ==
Home \ Away	AST	BAT	BOL	CSK	IRT	KSR	KHI	NAR	NKO	SHA	TAR	VOS	YEL	ZHI
Astana		1–1	0–0	3–0	1–1	2–1	2–0	2–0	3–1	1–0	4–0	2–1	0–1	2–0
Batyr	3–0		2–0	1–0	2–0	1–2	4–1	4–0	6–0	4–0	1–0	1–0	2–0	1–0
Bolat	0–5	0–0		1–0	0–4	2–4	0–3	2–0	0–1	0–2	1–3	0–3	0–4	0–2
CSKA Kairat	3–3	2–0	2–1		2–1	1–2	2–1	3–0 (Note: Match awarded.)	7–0	3–0	1–0	1–1	1–0	6–2
Irtysh Pavlodar	1–0	0–0	4–0	2–2		0–0	1–0	4–1	2–0	1–0	3–0	3–1	0–0	2–0
Kaisar-Hurricane	1–0	0–0	3–0	2–1	0–1		3–0	5–0	2–0	0–0	2–0	2–0	2–3	1–0
Khimik	0–0	1–2	3–0	2–0	2–2	0–0		1–1	1–0	1–0	1–0	1–2	0–1	1–1
Naryn	0–4	1–3	0–1	0–1	0–1	0–4	1–1		2–2	0–2	0–4	0–1	1–4	0–3
Nasha Kampaniya	0–1	1–2	2–2	0–1	0–1	0–1	0–0	2–0		1–3	0–0	2–1	1–4	1–1
Shakhter-Ispat-Karmet	1–2	1–2	2–0	1–0	0–1	1–2	2–0	4–0	0–0		2–2	0–1	1–1	5–2
Taraz	1–1	1–2	5–0	1–1	0–2	0–1	0–0	4–2	3–0	2–0		1–2	0–1	2–0
Vostok	1–2	2–1	4–0	3–2	0–2	2–0	3–0	5–1	5–1	1–0	3–1		1–0	5–1
Yelimay	3–1	2–2	5–0	4–1	3–2	2–1	6–1	3–0	1–0	3–1	3–1	1–0		3–1
Zhiger	2–3	2–3	3–0	1–2	1–3	1–1	0–1	3–1	1–0	2–1	2–2	0–1	0–2	

Legend: Blue = home team win; Yellow = draw; Red = away team win.

== Statistics ==
=== Top scorers ===
Rank	Player	Club	Goals
1	(Kazakhstan) Oleg Litvinenko	Yelimay	14
2	(Kazakhstan) Nurken Mazbaev	Kaisar-Hurricane	13
3	(Kazakhstan) Seitzhan Baibossynov	Zhiger	11
4	(Kazakhstan) Viktor Antonov	Irtysh	10
4	(Kazakhstan) Konstantin Kotov	Astana	10
6	(Kazakhstan) Vitaliy Airykh	Taraz	8
6	(Kazakhstan) Kairat Aubakirov	Yelimay	8
6	(Kazakhstan) Aleksandr Miroshnichenko	Yelimay	8

== See also ==
- Kazakhstan national football team 1998
