= 2008 Kazakhstan Cup =

Tournament details
- Country: Kazakhstan

Final positions
- Champions: Aktobe
- Runners-up: Almaty

The 2010 Kazakhstan Cup was the 17th season of the Kazakhstan Cup, the annual nationwide football cup competition of Kazakhstan since the independence of the country. The competition started on 9 April 2008 and finished with the Final played on 16 November 2008. The winners of the Cup earned a place in second qualifying round of the 2009–10 UEFA Europa League.

== First round ==
The first round involved 28 teams. When the draw was conducted teams were divided into three pots to avoid matches between the strongest clubs in the early stage of competition. The matches were played on April 9, 2008.

Team 1	Score	Team 2
FC Caspiy	0–2	FC Irtysh
FC Akzhayik	3–2	FC Okzhetpes
FC Kazakhmys	0–3	FC Tobol
FC Aktobe-Zhas	1–2	FC Energetik
Astana	1–0	FC Bolat
FC Karasay Sarbazdary	0–1	FC Esil Bogatyr
FC Ile-Saulet	1–4	FC Vostok
FC Kaisar	2–0	FC Asbest
FC Shakhter Karagandy	11–0	FC Gornyak
FC Taraz	1–2	FC Kairat
FC Avangard	1–3	FC Zhetysu
FC Spartak Semey	0–6	FC Ordabasy
FC Aksu	0–3	FC Almaty
FC Aizharyk	1–2	FC Megasport

== Round of 16 ==
The matches were played on April 23, 2008.

Team 1	Score	Team 2
FC Aktobe	5–0	FC Atyrau
FC Irtysh	3–1	FC Akzhayik
FC Tobol	4–0	FC Energetik
Astana	0–2	FC Esil Bogatyr
FC Vostok	1–0	FC Kaisar
FC Shakhter Karagandy	1–1 (aet, p. 4–5)	FC Kairat
FC Zhetysu	2–1 (aet)	FC Ordabasy
FC Almaty	4–1	FC Megasport

== Quarterfinals ==
The quarterfinal matches were played on May 7 (first legs) and May 14, 2008 (second legs).

Team 1	Agg.	Team 2	1st leg	2nd leg
FC Kairat	0–3	FC Aktobe	0–1	0–2
FC Vostok	4–3	FC Irtysh	4–1	0–2
FC Tobol	6–1	FC Zhetysu	4–1	2–0
FC Esil Bogatyr	1–4	FC Almaty	0–3	1–1

== Semifinals ==
The first legs were played on October 28 and second on November 12, 2008.

Team 1	Agg.	Team 2	1st leg	2nd leg
FC Vostok	4–7	FC Almaty	2–2	2–5
FC Tobol	1–2	FC Aktobe	1–1	0–1

The expulsion of FC Vostok, assessed on September 16, 2008 by the Football Federation of Kazakhstan for taking part in a fixed match, was revoked on October 2, 2008.

== Final ==
16 November 2008
14:00 UTC+6

FC Almaty	1 – 3	FC Aktobe
Kostrub 22'		Strukov 34', 36'; Golovskoy 86'

Almaty Central Stadium, Almaty
Attendance: 7,000
