= Kazakhstan Second League =

Association football league

Second League
- Founded: 2002
- Country: Kazakhstan
- Confederation: UEFA (Europe)
- Divisions: 2
- Number of clubs: 24
- Level on pyramid: 3
- Promotion to: First League
- Domestic cup: Kazakhstan Cup
- Website: kpl.kz

The Kazakhstan Second League (Kazakh: Қазақстан екінші лигасы, romanized: Qazaqstan ekınşı ligasy) is the third division of football in Kazakhstan. The League is controlled by the Kazakhstan Professional Football League and feeds into the Kazakhstan First League. It is divided in two conferences and runs from spring and to late autumn, making each championship correspond to a calendar year.

== 2025 Member clubs ==
=== Northeast Conference ===
Club	Stadium	City
SD Family М		Astana
Altai M		Oskemen
Astana M		Astana
Yelimai M		Semei
Zhenis M		Astana
Zhetisu M		Taldykorgan
Kyzylzhar M		Petropavl
Okzhetpes M		Kokshetau
Tobol M		Kostanay
Ulytau M		Jezkazgan
Shakhter M		Karaganda

=== Southwest Conference ===
Club	Stadium	City
Jeyran		Almaty
Arys		Arys
Atyrau M		Atyrau
Jaiyq		Uralsk
Jas Qyran		Almaty
Kaisar M		Kyzylorda
Caspiy M		Aktau
Maktaral		Atakent
Ordabasy M		Shymkent
Talas		Karatau
Turan M		Shymkent
