= 2007 Kazakhstan Premier League =

Kazakhstan Premier League
- Season: 2007
- Champions: Aktobe
- Champions League: Aktobe
- UEFA Cup: Tobol; Shakhter Karagandy
- UEFA Intertoto Cup: Zhetysu
- Top goalscorer: Jafar Irismetov (17)

The 2007 Kazakhstan Premier League was the 16th season of the Kazakhstan Premier League, the highest football league competition in Kazakhstan.

== Teams ==
For the 2007 season, Zhetysu were promoted to the Premier League, replacing Energetik. Avangard also earned promotion to the Premier League, but due not having the financial capabilities they weren't promoted and as a result Kaisar were spared relegation.

=== Team overview ===
Locations of teams in the 2007 Kazakhstan Premier League

Team	Location	Venue	Capacity
Aktobe	Aktobe	Central Stadium	13,200
Almaty	Almaty	Central Stadium	23,804
Astana	Astana	Kazhymukan Munaitpasov Stadium	12,350
Atyrau	Atyrau	Munaishy Stadium	9,500
Ekibastuzets	Ekibastuz	Shakhtyor Stadium	6,300
Esil Bogatyr	Petropavl	Karasai Stadium	11,000
Irtysh	Pavlodar	Central Stadium	15,000
Kairat	Almaty	Central Stadium	23,804
Kaisar	Kyzylorda	Gani Muratbayev Stadium	7,000
Okzhetpes	Kokshetau	Okzhetpes Stadium	4,158
Ordabasy	Shymkent	Kazhimukan Munaitpasov Stadium	20,000
Shakhter Karagandy	Karagandy	Shakhter Stadium	20,000
Taraz	Taraz	Central Stadium	12,525
Tobol	Kostanay	Central Stadium	8,323
Vostok	Oskemen	Vostok Stadium	8,500
Zhetysu	Taldykorgan	Zhetysu Stadium	4,000

== League table ==
Pos	Team	Pld	W	D	L	GF	GA	GD	Pts	Qualification or relegation
1	Aktobe (C)	30	22	6	2	55	12	+43	72	Qualification for the Champions League first qualifying round
2	Tobol	30	19	7	4	60	20	+40	64	Qualification for the UEFA Cup first qualifying round
3	Shakhter Karagandy	30	17	7	6	45	23	+22	58	Qualification for the UEFA Cup first qualifying round
4	Irtysh (Note: Irtysh did not earn a UEFA license, therefore their 2008 UEFA Intertoto Cup place was given to Zhetysu.)	30	16	4	10	34	27	+7	52	
5	Zhetysu	30	13	7	10	33	32	+1	46	Qualification for the Intertoto Cup first round
6	Alma-Ata	30	13	5	12	35	32	+3	44	
7	Vostok	30	12	5	13	30	38	−8	41	
8	Astana	30	11	8	11	34	25	+9	38	
9	Ordabasy	30	9	11	10	28	29	−1	38	
10	Kaisar	30	10	7	13	27	37	−10	37	
11	Esil Bogatyr	30	8	13	9	24	28	−4	37	
12	Ekibastuzets (Note: Ekibastuzets were expelled from the Premier League for Match fixing, and as a result Okzheptes spared relegation.) (R)	30	8	8	14	28	38	−10	32	Relegation to Kazakhstan First Division
13	Kairat	30	9	3	18	23	43	−20	30	
14	Atyrau	30	8	6	16	29	39	−10	30	
15	Okzhetpes	30	8	5	17	26	56	−30	29	
16	Taraz (R)	30	3	6	21	16	50	−34	15	Relegation to Kazakhstan First Division

Source: kpfl.kz
Rules for classification: 1) points; 2) goal difference; 3) number of goals scored.
(C) Champions; (R) Relegated

== Results ==
Home \ Away	ALM	AKT	AST	ATY	EKI	ESI	IRT	KRT	KSR	OKZ	ORD	SHA	TAR	TOB	VOS	ZHE
Almaty		0–1	0–0	1–0	0–0	1–0	3–1	2–0	2–0	4–0	1–1	1–1	4–0	2–1	2–1	1–3
Aktobe	2–0		2–0	1–0	3–1	2–1	1–0	2–0	5–0	2–1	2–1	0–0	5–0	1–0	1–0	2–0
Astana	0–1	1–2		1–0	3–0	1–1	0–0	5–0	1–0	2–0	1–0	3–0	2–0	4–1	1–1	1–1
Atyrau	1–0	1–2	3–2		1–1	0–2	1–2	3–0	4–1	3–0	0–0	0–5	3–0	0–4	2–0	1–1
Ekibastuzets	0–0	1–3	0–0	1–0		1–1	1–0	1–3	1–0	2–0	1–1	0–0	2–0	0–1	3–1	2–0
Esil Bogatyr	1–0	1–1	2–0	0–0	1–1		0–0	2–0	1–0	1–1	0–0	0–1	2–1	0–0	0–1	1–0
Irtysh Pavlodar	1–0	2–1	1–0	2–0	1–1	2–0		1–0	1–0	0–1	1–0	2–0	2–1	1–1	3–1	3–2
Kairat	3–1	0–2	0–2	3–1	1–0	2–1	0–2		2–1	2–4	3–0	0–2	0–0	0–2	0–2	1–0
Kaisar	1–0	0–0	2–1	1–1	3–2	0–0	3–1	2–1		0–0	3–1	1–0	2–0	1–1	0–4	0–1
Okzhetpes	1–0	0–6	0–0	1–2	1–0	2–1	1–2	0–1	2–2		3–1	1–2	3–2	0–0	0–1	0–1
Ordabasy	4–0	0–0	0–0	3–0	1–0	0–1	2–1	2–1	1–0	0–1		0–2	2–1	0–0	0–0	3–0
Shakhter Karagandy	1–1	0–0	2–1	1–0	2–0	5–1	2–1	1–0	1–0	3–1	0–0		2–0	3–1	1–1	0–0
Taraz	1–2	0–2	0–2	0–0	3–1	0–0	0–1	0–0	0–3	3–0	2–2	0–1		1–3	3–0	0–1
Tobol	4–2	0–0	2–0	1–0	2–0	3–0	1–0	1–0	1–0	10–1	3–0	4–2	2–0		7–0	0–0
Vostok	1–2	2–1	2–0	1–0	3–2	2–2	1–0	1–0	0–1	1–0	1–2	1–0	0–0	1–2		0–2
Zhetysu	1–2	0–3	2–0	2–1	3–2	1–1	3–0	0–0	1–1	2–1	1–1	1–0	1–0	1–2	1–0	

Legend: Blue = home team win; Yellow = draw; Red = away team win.

== Season statistics ==
=== Top scorers ===
As of match played 10 November 2007

Rank	Player	Club	Goals
1	(Uzbekistan) Jafar Irismetov	Almaty	17
2	(Moldova) Serghei Rogaciov	Aktobe	16
3	(Kazakhstan) Murat Suyumagambetov	Astana	10
3	(Kazakhstan) Sergei Ostapenko	Tobol	10
5	(Kazakhstan) Nurbol Zhumaskaliyev	Tobol	9
5	(Uzbekistan) Ulugbek Bakayev	Tobol	9
5	(Kazakhstan) Yuri Aksenov	Vostok	9
8	(Kazakhstan) Sergei Strukov	Irtysh	8
8	(Latvia) Mihails Miholaps	Shakhter	8
8	(Kazakhstan) Aleksandr Mitrofanov	Aktobe	8
