= Timur Sisenov =

Kazakhstani footballer

Personal information
- Date of birth: 20 June 1972 (age 54)
- Place of birth: Shymkent, Kazakh SSR, USSR
- Height: 1.79 m (5 ft 10 in)
- Position: Forward

International career
Years	Team	Apps	(Gls)
1994	Kazakhstan	1	(0)

Timur Zhakhanuly Sisenov (Kazakh: Тимур Жаханұлы Сисенов; born 20 June 1972) is a Kazakhstani former footballer who played as a forward. He made one appearance for the Kazakhstan national team in 1994.

== Career ==
Sisenov made his international debut for Kazakhstan on 17 April 1994 in a Uzbekistan Independence Cup match against Kyrgyzstan in MHSK Stadium, which finished as a goalless draw.
