= 1996 Kazakhstan Premier League =

Kazakhstan Top Division
- Season: 1996
- Champions: Taraz
- Asian Club Championship: Taraz
- Asian Cup Winners' Cup: Kairat
- Matches played: 306
- Goals scored: 749 (2.45 per match)
- Top goalscorer: Viktor Antonov (21)

The 1996 Kazakhstan Top Division was the fifth season of the Top Division, now called the Kazakhstan Premier League, the highest football league competition in Kazakhstan.

== Teams ==
There were no teams relegated at the end of the 1995 season, however Gornyak withdrew from the league at the start of the season, whilst Kaisar-Munai, Kokshe and Metallist were promoted to the Top Division. Prior to the start of the season Tsesna Akmola was renamed Tselinnik Akmola, Ansat became Irtysh Pavlodar and Aktyubinets became Aktobemunai.

=== Team overview ===
Locations of teams in the 1996 Kazakhstan Premier League

Team	Location	Venue	Capacity
Aktyubinets	Aktobe	Central Stadium	
Batyr	Ekibastuz	Shakhtyor Stadium	
Bolat	Temirtau	Metallurg Stadium	
Irtysh Pavlodar	Pavlodar	Central Stadium	
Kainar	Taldykorgan	Zhetysu Stadium	
Kairat	Almaty	Central Stadium	
Kaisar-Munai	Kyzylorda	Gani Muratbayev Stadium	
Kokshe	Kokshetau	Torpedo Stadium	
Metallist	Jezkazgan		
Munaishy	Aktau	Zhastar Stadium	
Shakhter Karagandy	Karaganda	Shakhter Stadium	
SKIF-Ordabasy	Shymkent	Kazhymukan Munaitpasov Stadium	
Taraz	Taraz	Central Stadium	
Tobol	Kostanay	Central Stadium	
Tselinnik Akmola	Astana	Kazhymukan Munaitpasov Stadium	
Vostok	Oskemen	Vostok Stadium	
Yelimay	Semey	Spartak Stadium	
Zhiger	Shymkent	Kazhymukan Munaitpasov Stadium	

== League table ==
Pos	Team	Pld	W	D	L	GF	GA	GD	Pts	Qualification
1	Taraz (C)	34	23	7	4	56	14	+42	76	Qualification for the Asian Club Championship
2	Irtysh Pavlodar	34	23	5	6	60	22	+38	74	
3	Yelimay	34	22	8	4	64	17	+47	74	
4	Munaishy	34	18	9	7	54	26	+28	63	
5	Batyr	34	18	9	7	43	22	+21	63	
6	Kairat	34	19	5	10	61	30	+31	62	Qualification for the Asian Cup Winners' Cup
7	Kaisar-Munai	34	15	11	8	39	25	+14	56	
8	Shakhter Karagandy	34	14	10	10	52	40	+12	52	
9	Kainar	34	14	6	14	35	40	−5	48	
10	Aktobemunai	34	13	6	15	42	48	−6	45	
11	Tobol	34	10	15	9	35	35	0	45	
12	Vostok	34	12	8	14	34	35	−1	44	
13	Tselinnik Akmola	34	12	3	19	44	61	−17	39	
14	Zhiger	34	9	9	16	39	50	−11	36	
15	Metallist	34	8	3	23	24	70	−46	27	
16	SKIF-Ordabasy	34	6	6	22	29	61	−32	24	
17	Bolat	34	5	2	27	26	76	−50	17	
18	Kokshe	34	2	4	28	12	77	−65	10	

Source: kpfl.kz
Rules for classification: 1) points; 2) goal difference; 3) number of goals scored.
(C) Champions

== Results ==
Home \ Away	AKT	BAT	BOL	IRT	KNR	KRT	KSR	KOK	MET	MUN	SHA	SKI	TAR	TSE	TOB	VOS	YEL	ZHI
Aktobemunai		1–0	8–0	0–3	3–1	1–0	1–0	3–0 (Note: As Kokshe withdrew after 18 games, the remaining 16 games were turned into a 0–3 win for the opponents.)	1–0	2–1	2–1	2–1	1–2	1–2	0–1	0–0	0–2	1–0
Batyr	0–0		2–1	0–2	1–0	2–1	1–0	1–0	1–0	0–1	2–2	2–0	2–1	3–0	3–0	2–0	0–0	2–0
Bolat	0–2	0–1		1–4	0–1	0–2	0–1	1–1	3–1	1–4	0–1	3–0	1–4	1–3	1–0	1–0	1–4	0–1
Irtysh Pavlodar	3–1	1–1	3–2		3–1	1–1	1–1	1–0	5–0	1–1	3–1	1–0	1–0	2–1	0–2	1–0	1–0	6–0
Kainar	2–0	0–2	1–0	1–2		0–1	0–1	3–1	3–1	1–1	2–1	1–0	0–2	0–2	0–0	1–0	3–1	0–0
Kairat	4–0	0–2	4–0	3–0	1–0		1–0	2–0	1–0	2–2	1–2	0–1	0–0	1–0	3–0	1–0	2–1	4–1
Kaisar-Munai	1–1	1–2	3–1	1–0	0–0	1–0		3–0	3–0	2–1	1–0	2–0	1–0	3–1	0–0	0–0	1–1	0–0
Kokshe	0–3	0–3	0–3	0–3	0–3	0–3	0–2		2–0	1–2	1–1	2–0	0–3	1–2	1–1	0–3	0–1	0–3
Metallist	2–0	1–0	3–1	0–1	1–2	0–3	0–2	3–0		0–2	1–3	1–0	1–0	2–1	1–1	0–2	1–1	2–0
Munaishy	1–0	1–1	1–1	1–0	3–0	3–0	1–1	2–0	4–1		1–1	3–0	2–3	3–0	2–0	1–0	0–0	2–0
Shakhter Karagandy	3–0	1–1	3–0	1–1	2–0	2–4	2–1	4–0	0–0	2–1		4–1	1–1	2–1	2–2	2–1	1–1	3–0
SKIF-Ordabasy	3–3	1–4	2–0	0–3	1–2	0–4	0–0	3–0	5–1	0–3	1–1		1–2	1–0	0–2	0–0	0–1	1–1
Taraz	3–0	1–0	3–1	1–0	4–0	2–1	0–1	2–0	4–0	1–0	2–0	2–0		3–0	0–0	0–0	1–0	0–0
Tselinnik Akmola	1–2	1–1	2–1	0–2	1–2	0–5	3–3	2–1	3–0	2–1	2–0	3–0	0–3		2–1	0–1	0–3	1–0
Tobol	1–1	1–1	3–0	0–2	1–1	1–1	1–1	3–0	1–0	2–0	1–0	2–1	0–2	2–2		0–1	1–1	2–1
Vostok	1–0	1–0	1–0	0–2	1–2	3–3	2–0	3–0	5–0	1–2	2–1	2–2	0–1	2–1	1–1		0–6	1–1
Yelimay	3–1	3–0	4–0	1–0	2–1	2–1	2–1	3–0	6–0	0–0	2–0	2–0	0–0	4–1	2–0	2–0		1–0
Zhiger	4–2	0–0	3–1	0–1	0–0	3–1	0–0	2–0	4–1	0–1	1–2	2–4	1–1	5–3	2–2	2–0	0–2	

Legend: Blue = home team win; Yellow = draw; Red = away team win.

== Statistics ==
=== Top scorers ===
Rank	Player	Club	Goals
1	(Kazakhstan) Viktor Antonov	Irtysh	21
2	(Kazakhstan) Vladimir Korolev	Aktobemunai	17
3	(Kazakhstan) Pavel Demyan	Tselinnik	15
4	(Kazakhstan) Askar Abildaev	Shakhter	14
4	(Kazakhstan) Bolat Esmagambetov	Yelimay	14

== See also ==
- Kazakhstan national football team 1996
