= Bulat Yesmagambetov =

Kazakhstani footballer

Personal information
- Full name: Bulat Zholdasuly Yesmagambetov
- Date of birth: 1 April 1968 (age 58)
- Place of birth: Aral, Kazakhstan
- Height: 1.75 m (5 ft 9 in)
- Position: Forward

Senior career*
Years	Team	Apps	(Gls)
1992	Galaks St. Petersburg	33	(8)
1993	Kosmos St. Petersburg	11	(4)
1993–1995	Lokomotiv St. Petersburg	73	(14)
1995	Trion-Volga Tver	10	(3)
1996–1997	Yelimay	36	(16)
1997	Irtysh Pavlodar	12	(7)
1998	PK-37		(18)
1999	Access-Esil	26	(11)
2000	Oryol	10	(0)

International career^{‡}
1997	Kazakhstan	7	(3)

Managerial career
- 2002: Yelimay
- 2003: Kaisar
- 2008–2009: Kyzylzhar
- 2021–: FC Kyran
- * Club domestic league appearances and goals as of 22 March 2016 ‡ National team caps and goals as of 22 March 2016

Bulat Zholdasuly Yesmagambetov (Kazakh: Болат Жолдасұлы Есмағамбетов; born 1 April 1968) is a retired football forward from Kazakhstan. He obtained a total number of seven caps for the Kazakhstan national football team during his career, scoring three goals.
