= Sergei Volgin =

Kazakh footballer (born 1960)

Personal information
- Full name: Sergei Vasilyevich Volgin
- Date of birth: 5 May 1960 (age 66)
- Place of birth: Almaty, Kazakh SSR, Soviet Union
- Height: 1.86 m (6 ft 1 in)
- Position: Midfielder

Youth career
- SDYuSShOR-3 Alma-Ata

Senior career*
Years	Team	Apps	(Gls)
1976–1977	ADK Alma-Ata		
1978–1979	Chkalovets Novosibirsk		
1979	Uralets	20	(2)
1980–1981	Kairat	3	(0)
1981–1983	Zhetysu	51	(22)
1984–1985	Kairat	65	(16)
1986	Spartak Moscow	9	(1)
1986–1989	Kairat	105	(20)
1990–1991	Metalurh Zaporizhya	63	(23)
1992	Kairat	33	(13)
1993–1995	Tekstilshchik Kamyshin	86	(10)
1996	Fakel Voronezh	28	(5)
1997	Energia Kamyshin	1	(0)

Managerial career
- 2001–2004: Uralan Elista (assistant)
- 2004: Uralan Elista (caretaker)
- 2005–2007: Irtysh Pavlodar
- 2008: Atyrau
- 2008: Sunkar
- 2009–2010: Kairat
- 2013: Kaisar
- 2014–2015: Akzhayik
- 2018–2019: Fakel Voronezh (assistant)
- 2021: Zhas Kyran (assistant)
- 2022: Zhas Kyran
- * Club domestic league appearances and goals

Sergei Vasilyevich Volgin (Russian: Сергей Васильевич Волгин; born 5 May 1960) is a Kazakhstani football coach and a former player.

== Playing career ==
Volgin played 174 games in Soviet Top League and scored 34 goals. His position was midfielder.

== Managerial career ==
Volgin started his coaching career in 2001 when he worked at Russian Uralan Elista. His first club to manage was Irtysh Pavlodar of Kazakhstan Premier League. He started season 2008 with Atyrau, but was sacked shortly because of poor team performance.

On 17 June 2015, Volgin was sacked as manager of Akzhayik.

== Honours ==
Kairat

- Kazakhstan Premier League: 1992

Individual

- Kazakhstan FF Best Player of the year: 1992
