= FC Kaisar =

Kazakh football club

Kaysar Kyzylorda
- Full name: Football Club Kaysar
- Nicknames: Қасқырлар (The Wolves); Қызыл шайтандар (Kazakhstan's Red Devils)
- Founded: 1968; 58 years ago
- Ground: Gani Muratbayev Stadium; Kyzylorda, Kazakhstan
- Capacity: 7,000
- Chairman: Sadyk Mustafayev
- Manager: Talgat Baysufinov
- League: Kazakhstan First League
- 2026: Kazakhstan Premier League, 16th of 16 (relegated)
- Website: fckaysar.kz
Home colours	Away colours

FC Kaysar (Kazakh: Қайсар Футбол Клубы, Qaisar Futbol Kluby) is a Kazakh professional football club based in the Gany Muratbayev Stadium in Kyzylorda. The founding members of the Kazakhstan Premier League, they will compete in the Kazakhstan First League in the 2027 season after relegation. Their most successful was the 1998 season, when they won the Kazakhstan Cup and came fourth in the league. They have also won the 2019 Kazakhstan Cup.

== History ==
=== Names ===
- 1968 : Founded as Volna
- 1969 : Renamed Avtomobilist
- 1974 : Renamed Orbita
- 1979 : Renamed Meliorator
- 1990 : Renamed Kaisar
- 1996 : Renamed Kaisar-Munai for sponsorship reasons
- 1997, July : Renamed Kaisar-Hurricane for sponsorship reasons
- 2001 : Renamed Kaisar again

=== Domestic history ===
Season	League									Kazakhstan Cup	Top goalscorer		Manager
Season	Div.	Pos.	Pl.	W	D	L	GS	GA	P	Kazakhstan Cup	Name	League	Manager
1992	1st	10	26	9	2	15	25	29	20		(Kazakhstan) Sergei Kogai	21	
1993	1st	21	48	15	6	27	52	85	36				
1994	2nd	9											
1995	2nd	1											
1996	1st	7	34	15	11	8	39	25	56				
1997	1st	8	26	13	5	8	39	23	44	Runners-up	(Kazakhstan) Vladimir Loginov	12	
1998	1st	4	26	16	5	5	42	17	53	Winner	(Kazakhstan) Nurken Mazbaev	13	
1999	1st	5	30	17	7	6	47	19	58		(Kazakhstan) Nurken Mazbaev	11	
2000	1st	6	28	12	7	9	36	23	43		(Kazakhstan) Vladimir Loginov	12	
2001	1st	11	32	11	7	14	33	40	40				
2002	1st	10	32	10	2	20	31	55	32				(Kazakhstan) M.Esmuratov
2003	1st	13	32	9	7	16	26	42	34				
2004	1st	16	36	9	4	23	24	61	31				
2005	2nd	1	22	17	4	1	51	10	55				
2006	1st	15	30	8	4	18	29	53	28				
2007	1st	10	30	10	7	13	27	37	37				(Kazakhstan) S.Gorokhovodatskiy
2008	1st	4	30	13	10	7	29	22	49	Round of 16			(Kazakhstan) V.Nikitenko
2009	1st	13	26	3	5	18	15	45	14	Quarter-final			(Russia) K.Dyshekov / (Kazakhstan) S.Abildaev (Kazakhstan) T.Turmagambetov / (Kazakhstan) V.Linchevskiy
2010	2nd	2	34	25	6	3	74	23	81	First round			(Kazakhstan) V.Linchevskiy
2011	1st	8	32	10	5	17	29	53	27	Second round	(Serbia) Ivan Perić	5	(Lithuania) A.Liubinskas
2012	1st	9	26	8	6	12	21	33	30	Quarter-final	(Bosnia and Herzegovina) Gradimir Crnogorac	4	(Kazakhstan) S.Kogai (Kazakhstan) V.Nikitenko
2013	2nd	1	34	23	8	3	77	20	74	Second round			(Kazakhstan) S.Volgin
2014	1st	5	32	10	13	9	30	34	27	Second round	(Estonia) Rimo Hunt	8	(Kazakhstan) D.Ogai
2015	1st	12	32	4	12	16	20	36	16	Quarter-final	(Kazakhstan) Zhasulan Moldakaraev	6	(Kazakhstan) D.Ogai / (Russia) F.Shcherbachenko
2016	2nd	1	28	20	7	1	49	9	67	Last 16			
2017	1st	6	33	11	9	13	30	36	42	Last 16	(Ukraine) Volodymyr Arzhanov (Martinique) Mathias Coureur (Kazakhstan) Maksat Baizhanov	5	(Bulgaria) S.Mladenov
2018	1st	5	33	11	12	10	35	31	45	Quarter-final	(Martinique) Mathias Coureur	7	(Bulgaria) S.Mladenov
2019	1st	6	33	12	6	15	37	43	42	Winner	(Armenia) Tigran Barseghyan	12	(Bulgaria) S.Mladenov
2020	1st	7	20	6	6	8	20	23	24	-	(Georgia (country)) Elguja Lobjanidze	8	(Bulgaria) S.Mladenov
2021	1st	13	26	4	7	15	24	44	19	Quarter-final	(Lithuania) Karolis Laukžemis	8	(Kazakhstan) S.Abildaev (Kazakhstan) V.Nikitenko
2022	2nd	2	26	17	5	4	60	26	56	Quarter-final	(Guinea) Mamadou Diallo	19	(Kazakhstan) S.Abildaev
2023	1st	6	26	10	6	10	31	30	36	Round of 16	(Belarus) Dzmitry Baradzin	8	(Russia) V.Kumykov
2024	1st	8	24	9	7	8	28	29	34	Round of 16	(Kazakhstan) Aybar Zhaksylykov	7	(Russia) V.Kumykov

=== Continental history ===
As of match played 17 September 2020

Competition	GP	W	D	L	GF	GA	±
Asian Cup Winners' Cup	6	1	2	3	6	8	-2
UEFA Europa League	1	0	0	1	1	4	-3
Total	7	1	2	4	7	12	−5

Season	Competition	Round	Club	Home	Away	Aggregate
1998–99	Asian Cup Winners' Cup	1R	(Turkmenistan) Nisa Aşgabat	0–1	1–1	0–2
1999–2000	Asian Cup Winners' Cup	1R	(Tajikistan) Khujand	3–0	0–3	(p) 3–3
1999–2000	Asian Cup Winners' Cup	2R	(Uzbekistan) Navbahor Namangan	2–2	0–1	2–3
2020–21	UEFA Europa League	2QR	(Cyprus) APOEL	1–4	—N/a	—N/a

== Honours ==
- Kazakhstan Cup
  - Champions (2): 1998, 2019
- Kazakhstan First Division
  - Champions (4): 1995, 2005, 2013, 2016

== Current squad ==
As of 17 July 2026

Note: Flags indicate national team as defined under FIFA eligibility rules; some limited exceptions apply. Players may hold more than one non-FIFA nationality.

No.	Pos.	Nation	Player
1	GK	KAZ	Nurymzhan Salaidin
2	DF	KAZ	Timur Redzhepov
3	DF	KAZ	Abylaykhan Tolegenov
5	DF	KAZ	Adilet Kenesbek
6	MF	KAZ	Ersultan Kaldybekov
7	FW	KAZ	Batyrkhan Tazhibay
9	FW	KAZ	Nurdaulet Agzambaev
10	FW	GBS	Agostinho
11	MF	NGR	Victor Moses
12	DF	KAZ	Sagi Sovet
13	FW	KAZ	Nurali Zhaksylyk (on loan from Astana)
14	FW	BRA	Gustavo Zago
15	DF	KAZ	Niyaz Idrisov
16	GK	KAZ	Aykyn Azhikhan
17	MF	KAZ	Salamat Zhumabekov

No.	Pos.	Nation	Player
18	FW	KAZ	Dinmukhammed Rustemuly
23	FW	KAZ	Muslim Zhumat
24	MF	SRB	Nikola Cuckić
25	DF	SRB	Stefan Bukorac
29	FW	KAZ	Ramazan Bagdat (on loan from Kairat)
33	DF	KAZ	Elzhas Sarbay
40	GK	SVK	Adam Kováč
42	MF	BRA	Miquéias
43	DF	BRA	Klaidher Macedo
47	FW	KAZ	Bakdaulet Konlimkos
70	FW	NGR	Imoh Ezekiel
82	DF	KAZ	Rinat Akbergen
93	DF	KAZ	Sultan Askarov (on loan from Kairat)
96	FW	KAZ	Aliyar Mukhammed

== Managers ==
- (Russia) Aleksandr Prokhorov (1981–82)
- (Kazakhstan) Marat Esmuratov (2002)
- (Kazakhstan) Bulat Esmagambetov (May 2003)
- (Kazakhstan) Tleuhan Turmagambetov (May 2003 – Oct 2006)
- (Russia) Viktor Kumykov (2003 – Oct 2004)
- (Kazakhstan) Sergei Gorokhovodatskiy (2007)
- (Kazakhstan) Vladimir Nikitenko (1 Jan 2008 – 31 Dec 2008)
- (Russia) Khazret Dyshekov (April 2009)
- (Kazakhstan) Sultan Abildayev (April 2009 – Aug 2009)
- (Kazakhstan) Tleuhan Turmagambetov (Aug 2009)
- (Kazakhstan) Vladimir Linchevskiy (Aug 2009 – Feb 2011)
- (Lithuania) Algimantas Liubinskas (Jan 2011 – Feb 2012)
- (Kazakhstan) Sergei Kogai (31 Jan 2012 – 24 April 2012)
- (Kazakhstan) Vladimir Nikitenko (24 April 2012 – 31 Dec 2012)
- (Kazakhstan) Sergei Volgin (18 Jan 2013 – 17 Nov 2013)
- (Kazakhstan) Dmitriy Ogai (30 Nov 2013 – 23 July 2015)
- (Russia) Fyodor Shcherbachenko (6 Aug 2015 – 10 Nov 2015)
- (Bulgaria) Stoycho Mladenov (1 Jan 2017 – 10 Nov 2020)
- (Kazakhstan) Sultan Abildayev (15 Dec 2020 – 13 Dec 2022)
- (Russia) Viktor Kumykov (13 Dec 2022 – 4 Nov 2025)
- (Kazakhstan) Andrey Ferapontov (20 Nov 2025 – 31 Aug 2025)
- (Kazakhstan) Dmitriy Karpov (1 Sept 2025 – 24 Oct 2025)
- (Kazakhstan) Talgat Baysufinov (25 Oct 2025 – present)
