= 2003 Kazakhstan Premier League =

Kazakhstan Premier League
- Season: 2003
- Champions: Irtysh Pavlodar
- Top goalscorer: Andrei Finonchenko (18)

The 2003 Kazakhstan Premier League was the 12th season of the Kazakhstan Premier League, the highest football league competition in Kazakhstan, and took place between 12 April and 3 November.

== Teams ==
There were 5 promoted teams to the Premier League for this season, Ekibastuzets, Batys, Dostyk, Taraz and Zhetysu. The Premier League was expanded to 17 teams before the season started and to 19 teams for the 2004 season, this mean no teams were relegated before or after the season. Before the start of the season Vostok Altyn were renamed Vostok and Dostyk became Ordabasy.

Due to failure to comply with UEFA regulations, no teams qualified for any UEFA competition.

=== Team overview ===
Team	Location	Venue	Capacity
Aktobe-Lento	Aktobe	Central Stadium	13,200
Atyrau	Atyrau	Munaishy Stadium	9,500
Batys	Oral	Petr Atoyan Stadium	8,320
Ekibastuzets	Ekibastuz	Shakhtyor Stadium	6,300
Esil	Kokshetau	Okzhetpes Stadium	4,158
Esil Bogatyr	Petropavl	Karasai Stadium	11,000
Irtysh	Pavlodar	Central Stadium	15,000
Kairat	Almaty	Central Stadium	23,804
Kaisar	Kyzylorda	Gany Muratbayev Stadium	7,500
Ordabasy	Shymkent	Kazhimukan Munaitpasov Stadium	20,000
Shakhter Karagandy	Karagandy	Shakhter Stadium	20,000
Taraz	Taraz	Central Stadium	12,525
Tobol	Kostanay	Central Stadium	8,323
Vostok	Oskemen	Vostok Stadium	8,500
Zhenis Astana	Astana	Kazhymukan Munaitpasov Stadium	12,350
Yelimay	Semey	Spartak Stadium	
Zhetysu	Taldykorgan	Zhetysu Stadium	4,000

== League table ==
Pos	Team	Pld	W	D	L	GF	GA	GD	Pts
1	Irtysh (Note: Irtysh were penalized with two technical losses due to fielding an in-eligible player.) (C)	32	25	3	4	59	20	+39	78
2	Tobol	32	24	4	4	55	19	+36	76
3	Zhenis Astana	32	20	4	8	65	33	+32	64
4	Atyrau (Note: Atyrau were penalized with a technical loss due to fielding an in-eligible player.)	32	16	5	11	48	42	+6	53
5	Aktobe-Lento	32	13	12	7	40	29	+11	51
6	Ordabasy	32	15	4	13	33	29	+4	49
7	Kairat	32	14	7	11	51	42	+9	49
8	Zhetysu	32	14	6	12	46	38	+8	48
9	Yelimay	32	12	7	13	35	35	0	43
10	Shakhter Karagandy	32	10	12	10	37	29	+8	42
11	Esil Bogatyr	32	10	6	16	42	53	−11	36
12	Taraz	32	10	4	18	35	45	−10	34
13	Kaisar	32	9	7	16	26	42	−16	34
14	Vostok	32	8	8	16	34	46	−12	32
15	Ekibastuzets	32	8	4	20	30	56	−26	28
16	Batys	32	8	2	22	25	74	−49	26
17	Esil (Note: Esil were deducted 6 points due to a violation of transfer rules, whilst their last four games were awarded as technical losses due to being suspended on 23 October.)	32	4	9	19	13	42	−29	15

Source: kpfl.kz
Rules for classification: 1) points; 2) goal difference; 3) number of goals scored.
(C) Champions

== Results ==
Home \ Away	AKT	ATY	BAT	EKI	ESK	EBO	IRT	KRT	KSR	ORD	SHA	TAR	TOB	VOS	YEL	ZHN	ZHE
Aktobe		2–0	5–1	2–0	2–1	2–0	0–2	4–2	0–0	1–0	1–0	2–1	1–2	1–0	1–1	0–0	0–0
Atyrau	1–1		3–1	1–0	2–0	0–1	1–2	1–1	2–1	1–1	3–2	4–1	1–3	3–1	1–0	3–1	3–2
Batys	1–2	1–0		2–1	1–0	2–1	0–1	1–5	0–1	2–0	0–1	2–1	0–2	1–1	0–2	1–3	2–0
Ekibastuzets	2–1	1–2	4–0		1–0	0–4	0–1	1–1	3–0	2–3	1–1	2–0	0–3	1–2	3–0	0–1	0–1
Esil	1–1	0–3 (Note: For breaking the transfer rules, Esil was deducted 6 points; in addition, the club was suspended from October 23. The remaining 4 games were declared 0–3 regular defeats.)	1–1	1–1		1–3	1–4	1–0	0–2	0–3	1–1	1–0	1–2	1–0	0–1	0–1	0–1
Esil Bogatyr	5–2	2–3	4–1	1–1	1–0		0–1	0–2	1–2	2–0	1–1	1–1	0–0	1–0	3–2	3–3	2–1
Irtysh Pavlodar	2–1	5–1	6–0	5–0	0–1	2–0		1–0	2–1	1–0	2–1	1–0	0–0	2–0	1–0	1–0	2–1
Kairat	1–1	2–1	4–0	1–0	1–1	3–2	1–3		5–1	1–0	2–0	0–0	1–3	2–1	2–0	1–3	0–2
Kaisar	0–0	2–3	0–1	0–1	0–0	2–1	3–0 (Note: As Irtysh fielded an ineligible player, the matches between Ordabasy and Irtysh and Kaisar and Irtysh were converted into 3–0 wins for the home team.)	0–2		1–0	0–0	1–2	1–2	1–0	0–0	3–2	1–0
Ordabasy	1–1	1–2	1–0	0–1	0–0	1–0	3–0	3–0	3–1		2–0	1–0	1–2	1–0	1–0	2–0	1–1
Shakhter Karagandy	0–0	1–0	2–0	3–0	0–0	2–0	0–1	0–0	1–1	3–0		5–1	2–0	1–0	1–1	1–1	2–2
Taraz	1–2	3–0 (Note: As Atyrau fielded an ineligible player, the match between Taraz and Atyrau was turned into a 3–0 win for the home team.)	3–0	3–1	3–0	2–1	0–1	1–4	1–0	1–2	3–1		0–0	3–1	1–2	0–2	1–1
Tobol	1–0	1–1	2–1	1–0	1–0	6–0	0–1	2–1	2–1	3–0	1–0	3–0		2–0	1–0	3–1	1–0
Vostok	0–0	0–2	7–2	4–0	0–0	2–1	0–0	2–2	0–0	2–0	1–1	1–0	0–2		2–1	2–3	2–1
Yelimay	1–1	0–0	2–0	4–1	1–0	4–0	2–1	1–2	2–0	1–0	1–0	2–1	1–3	2–2		0–1	0–1
Zhenis Astana	2–1	1–0	6–1	5–1	2–0	4–1	1–1	3–1	2–0	0–1	1–3	0–1	2–0	5–0	4–0		2–0
Zhetysu	0–2	2–0	3–0	3–1	3–0	0–0	2–7	3–1	4–0	0–1	2–1	1–0	2–1	4–1	1–1	2–3	

Source: RSSSF
Legend: Blue = home team win; Yellow = draw; Red = away team win.

== Season statistics ==
=== Top scorers ===
As of match played 3 November 2003

Rank	Player	Club	Goals
1	(Kazakhstan) Andrei Finonchenko	Shakhter	16
2	(Kazakhstan) Nurbol Zhumaskaliyev	Tobol	16
3	(Kazakhstan) Aleksandr Shatskikh	Zhenis	14
3	(Turkmenistan) Rejepmyrat Agabaýew	Atyrau	14
5	(Kazakhstan) Alibek Buleshev	Kairat	13
5	(Kazakhstan) Oleg Litvinenko	Elimay	13
7	(Turkmenistan) Muslim Agaýew	Irtysh	11
8	(Kazakhstan) Murat Tleshev	Irtysh	10
8	(Kazakhstan) Pavel Udalov	Vostok	10
8	(Kazakhstan) Dilmurat Nazarov	Taraz	10
8	(Kazakhstan) Oleg Tarasov	Kairat	10
8	(Kazakhstan) Valeriy Garkusha	Tobol	10
