= Dmitry Ogay =

Kazakhstani footballer (born 1960)

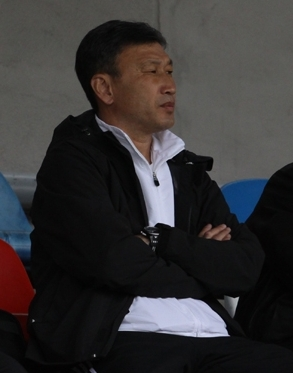
- Ogay in 2011

Personal information
- Full name: Dmitry Alekseyevich Ogay
- Date of birth: 14 May 1960 (age 66)
- Place of birth: Dzhambul (now Taraz), Kazakh SSR, Soviet Union
- Height: 1.85 m (6 ft 1 in)
- Position: Defender

Senior career*
Years	Team	Apps	(Gls)
1978–1979	Khimik Dzhambul	31	(1)
1980	Kairat	1	(0)
1981–1983	Pakhtakor	32	(0)
1984–1986	Khimik Dzhambul	67	(13)
1986–1988	Kairat	65	(1)
1989	Khimik Dzhambul	29	(0)
1990–1992	Shakhter Karagandy	98	(7)
1993	Dostyk	29	(1)
1993–1994	Preußen Hameln	12	(0)
1994	Aktyubinets	18	(1)
1995	Kairat	20	(1)
1996	Munaishy	14	(0)
1996–1997	Taraz	23	(0)

Managerial career
- 1998: CSKA-Kairat (assistant)
- 1999: Aksess-Yesil (assistant)
- 2000–2001: Esil Bogatyr
- 2002–2004: Irtysh Pavlodar
- 2005: Alma-Ata (consultant)
- 2005–2010: Tobol
- 2010: Taraz
- 2011: Ural Yekaterinburg
- 2012: Kairat
- 2012–2013: Neftekhimik Nizhnekamsk
- 2013–2015: Kaisar
- 2015–2016: Tobol
- 2016–2021: Zhetysu
- 2023: Khan-Tengri
- * Club domestic league appearances and goals

Dmitry Alekseyevich Ogay (oh-GUY; Russian: Дмитрий Алексеевич Огай; born 14 May 1960) is a Kazakhstani professional football manager of Korean descent. He is one of the most successful coaches in Kazakhstan. Ogay played seven seasons in the Soviet Top League with Kairat and Pakhtakor, appearing in over 100 league matches.

== Managerial career ==
Following a surprise defeat to Kyzylzhar in the Kazakhstan Cup, Ogay left Tobol by mutual consent on 28 April 2016. In 2023 he became the head coach of Kazakhstan First League club Khan-Tengri.

Season	Team	Position
2000	Esil Bogatyr	2
2001	Esil Bogatyr	3
2002	Irtysh Pavlodar	1
2003	Irtysh	1
2004	Irtysh	2
2005	Tobol	2
2006	Tobol	3
2007	Tobol	2
2008	Tobol	2
2009	Tobol	

== Honours ==
- Irtysh Pavlodar
  - Kazakhstan Premier League: 2002, 2003
- FC Tobol
  - Kazakhstan Cup: 2007
  - Intertoto Cup: 2007
