= Nurken Mazbayev =

Kazakhstani footballer

Personal information
- Full name: Nurken Kaldybekuly Mazbayev
- Date of birth: 4 June 1972 (age 54)
- Place of birth: Taraz, Kazakh SSR, Soviet Union
- Height: 1.75 m (5 ft 9 in)
- Position: Forward

Youth career
- Taraz

Senior career*
Years	Team	Apps	(Gls)
1992–1997	Taraz	159	(59)
1998–1999	Kaisar	33	(25)
1999	Sintez	14	(4)
2000	Zhenis Astana	27	(9)
2001	Dostyk	25	(5)
2002–2003	Tobol	44	(14)
2004	Ordabasy	12	(1)
2004	Taraz	85	(23)
Total		399	(140)

International career^{‡}
1995–2000	Kazakhstan	13	(2)
- * Club domestic league appearances and goals as of 22 March 2016 ‡ National team caps and goals as of 22 March 2016

Nurken Kaldybekuly Mazbayev (Kazakh: Нұркен Қалдыбекұлы Мәзбаев, romanized: Nūrken Qaldybekūly Mäzbaev; born 4 June 1972) is a former Kazakhstani football forward. He retired on 20 May 2008, having played 16 seasons and scoring 142 goals in Kazakhstan Premier League, which makes him the second all-time top scorer of the tournament.

Mazbayev made 13 appearances and scored 2 goals for the Kazakhstan national football team from 2000 to 2004. He has managed Taraz.

== Career statistics ==
=== Club statistics ===
Last update: 11 June 2008

Season	Team	Country	League	Level	Apps	Goals
1992	Taraz	Kazakhstan	Premier League	1	15	
1993	Taraz	Kazakhstan	Premier League	1	41	12
1994	Taraz	Kazakhstan	Premier League	1	26	6
1995	Taraz	Kazakhstan	Premier League	1	26	19
1996	Taraz	Kazakhstan	Premier League	1	28	8
1997	Taraz	Kazakhstan	Premier League	1	23	16
1998	Kaisar	Kazakhstan	Premier League	1	21	14
1999	Kaisar	Kazakhstan	Premier League	1	12	11
1999	Sintez	Kazakhstan	Premier League	1	14	4
2000	Zhenis	Kazakhstan	Premier League	1	28	9
2001	Dostyk	Kazakhstan	Premier League	1	15	3
2001	Kairat	Kazakhstan	Premier League	1	10	2
2002	Tobol	Kazakhstan	Premier League	1	27	9
2003	Tobol	Kazakhstan	Premier League	1	17	5
2004	Ordabasy	Kazakhstan	Premier League	1	12	1
2004	Taraz	Kazakhstan	Premier League	1	15	3
2005	Taraz	Kazakhstan	Premier League	1	25	11
2006	Taraz	Kazakhstan	Premier League	1	21	6
2007	Taraz	Kazakhstan	Premier League	1	24	3
Total					400	142

=== International goals ===
#	Date	Venue	Opponent	Score	Result	Competition
1.	11 June 1997	Railway Stadium, Lahore, Pakistan	Pakistan	0–7	Won	1998 FIFA WC Qual.
2.	29 June 1997	Central Stadium, Almaty, Kazakhstan	Iraq	3–1	Won	1998 FIFA WC Qual.
Correct as of 7 October 2016

== Honours ==
=== Club ===
Taraz

- Kazakhstan Super League (1): 1996

Sintez

- Kazakhstan Cup (1): 1999

Zhenis Astana

- Kazakhstan Super League (1): 2000

Kairat

- Kazakhstan Super League (1): 2001

Ordabasy

- Kazakhstan Super League (1): 2004

=== Individual ===
- Kazakhstan Top scorer: 1997
