= FC Irtysh Pavlodar =

Kazakh football club

Ertis
- Full name: Ertis Football Club; Ертіс футбол клубы
- Founded: 1965; 61 years ago
- Ground: Central Stadium; Pavlodar, Kazakhstan
- Capacity: 12,000
- Chairman: Roman Skljar
- Manager: Vacant
- League: Kazakhstan First League
- 2024: Kazakhstan Second League (promoted)
- Website: ertis-fc.kz
Home colours	Away colours

Ertis FC (Kazakh: Ертіс ФК), also known by its Russian name FC Irtysh (Russian: ФК Иртыш), is a Kazakh professional football club based at the Central Stadium in Pavlodar. Irtysh won the Kazakhstan Premier league in 1993 (as Ansat), 1997, 1999, 2002 and 2003. The club was also founding members of the top league and never relegated to lower levels before being dissolved in 2020. The club resumed operations and entered Kazakhstan Second League in 2024, winning promotion to the Kazakhstan First League for 2025. Irtysh had participated in the AFC Champions League a number of times, reaching the semi-finals in 2001 (the final year of Kazakhstan's AFC affiliation), and played in UEFA Champions League qualifying round in 2003.

== History ==
On 9 August 2017, Dimitar Dimitrov resigned as manager of the club, with Sergei Klimov being appointed in a caretaker capacity the next day. Vyacheslav Hroznyi was appointed as the club's permanent manager on 17 August 2017, leaving the club at the end of the 2017 season. On 21 December 2017, Gerard Nus was appointed as the new manager of Irtysh Pavlodar on a two-year contract.

On 28 April 2018 Nus was sacked as the club's manager, with Dmitry Kuznetsov being appointed as Caretaker Manager. On 10 July 2018, Irtysh Pavlodar announced the return of Dimitar Dimitrov on a two-and-a-half-year contract.

At the end of April 2019, rumors that manager Dimitar Dimitrov had left his role were downplayed by the club, but Dimitrov and his coaching staff subsequently went AWOL for Irtysh Pavlodar's match against Zhetysu on 1 May 2019. The following day, 2 May 2019, Dimitrov and his staff where summoned by club's leadership to explain their absence. Their explanation wasn't deemed valid by the club and Dimitrov was suspended. Sergey Klimov was appointed as caretaker manager. On 7 June 2019, Milan Milanović was announced as the club's new manager.

On 30 May 2020, the Professional Football League of Kazakhstan announced that Irtysh Pavlodar had withdrawn from the league due to financial problems. All of their matches were excluded from the league results.

== Naming history ==
- 1965 : Irtysh
- 1968 : Traktor
- 1993 : Ansat
- 1996 : Irtysh
- 1999 : Irtysh-Bastau
- 2000 : Irtysh

== Statistics ==
=== Domestic history ===
Season	League									Kazakhstan Cup	Top goalscorer		Managers
Season	Div.	Pos.	Pl.	W	D	L	GS	GA	P	Kazakhstan Cup	Name	League	Managers
1992	1st	3	26	14	8	4	39	22	36	-	(Kazakhstan) Rylov	16	(Kazakhstan) Yaryshev
1993	1st	1	22	14	6	2	43	15	34	-	(Kazakhstan) Antonov	20	(Kazakhstan) Yaryshev / (Kazakhstan) Veretnov
1994	1st	2	30	17	7	6	57	14	41	-	(Kazakhstan) Abildaev	14	(Kazakhstan) Veretnov
1995	1st	7	30	12	9	9	38	28	45	-	(Kazakhstan) Antonov / (Kazakhstan) D.Malikov / (Kazakhstan) Rylov	8	(Kazakhstan) Chebotarev
1996	1st	2	34	23	5	6	60	22	74	-	(Kazakhstan) Antonov	21	(Kazakhstan) Veretnov
1997	1st	1	26	17	5	4	46	15	56	-	(Kazakhstan) Zubarev	10	(Kazakhstan) Veretnov
1998	1st	3	26	17	6	3	44	15	57	Winners	(Kazakhstan) Antonov	10	(Kazakhstan) Talgayev / (Kazakhstan) Berdalin
1999	1st	1	30	24	4	2	69	19	76	-	(Kazakhstan) Zubarev	22	(Kazakhstan) Chernov / (Kazakhstan) Linchevskiy
2000	1st	3	28	19	3	6	50	26	60	-	(Brazil) Mendes	21	(Kazakhstan) Linchevskiy
2001	1st	4	32	17	9	6	48	22	60	Runners-up	(Brazil) Mendes	9	(Russia) Nazarenko
2002	1st	1	32	21	8	3	63	14	71	Runners-up	(Kazakhstan) Shatskikh	13	(Kazakhstan) Ogai
2003	1st	1	32	25	3	4	59	20	78	-	(Turkmenistan) Agaýew	11	(Kazakhstan) Ogai
2004	1st	2	36	24	7	5	56	16	79	-	(Kazakhstan) Tleshev	12	(Kazakhstan) Ogai
2005	1st	5	30	18	3	9	51	24	57	-	(Kazakhstan) Tleshev	20	(Kazakhstan) Volgin
2006	1st	6	30	13	8	9	34	24	47	-	(Turkmenistan) Urazow	10	(Kazakhstan) Volgin
2007	1st	4	30	16	4	10	34	27	52	-	(Russia) Strukov	8	(Kazakhstan) Volgin
2008	1st	3	30	18	8	4	58	28	62	Quarter-finals	(Kazakhstan) Tleshev	13	(Kazakhstan) Saduov
2009	1st	9	26	8	5	13	24	31	29	Quarter-finals	(Bulgaria) Daskalov	5	(Kazakhstan) Saduov / (Russia) Nazarenko
2010	1st	3	32	16	8	8	39	30	56	Third round	(Bulgaria) Daskalov	15	(Kazakhstan) Baisufinov
2011	1st	5	32	15	5	12	50	50	32	Semi-finals	(Kazakhstan) Maltsev	10	(Kazakhstan) Baisufinov
2012	1st	2	26	15	6	5	46	20	51	Runners-up	(Uzbekistan) Bakayev	14	(Kazakhstan) Baisufinov
2013	1st	4	32	12	8	12	41	39	27	Semi-finals	(Kazakhstan) Begalyn	5	(Kazakhstan) Baisufinov
2014	1st	10	32	9	7	16	39	44	25	Quarter-finals	(Ukraine) Dudchenko	11	(Kazakhstan) Baisufinov / (Estonia) Rüütli / (Kazakhstan) Saduova / (Russia) Cheryshev
2015	1st	6	32	10	10	12	37	39	25	Second round	(Ukraine) Dudchenko	8	(Russia) Cheryshev / (Kazakhstan) Klimov(caretaker) / (Bulgaria) Dimitrov
2016	1st	3	32	14	7	11	52	36	49	Semi-finals	(Kazakhstan) Murtazayev	18	(Bulgaria) Dimitrov
2017	1st	4	33	12	12	9	35	32	48	Quarter-final	(Brazil) António / (Kazakhstan) Darabayev / (Portugal) Fonseca	5	(Bulgaria) Dimitrov / (Kazakhstan) Klimov (caretaker) / (Ukraine) Hroznyi
2018	1st	10	33	10	5	18	28	45	35	Semi-final	(Kazakhstan) Shabalin	5	(Spain) Nus / (Kazakhstan) Kuznetsov (caretaker) / (Kazakhstan) Saduov / (Bulgaria) Dimitrov
2019	1st	8	33	11	4	18	30	45	37	Quarter-final	(France) Manzorro	6	(Bulgaria) Dimitrov / (Kazakhstan) Klimov (caretaker) / (Serbia) Milanović
2020	1st	12	Withdrew after 2 rounds							n/a	(Portugal) Fonseca	1	(Uzbekistan) Babayan
2021	Did not participate in professional divisions												
2022	Did not participate in professional divisions												
2023	Did not participate in professional divisions												
2024	3rd	1	22	18	2	2	70	15	56				
2025	2nd	2	26	19	4	3	71	20	61				

=== Continental history ===
Season	Competition	Round	Club	Home	Away	Aggregate
1994–95	Asian Club Championship	Preliminary round	(Uzbekistan) Neftchi Fargʻona	0–3		
1994–95	Asian Club Championship	Preliminary round	(Turkmenistan) Köpetdag Aşgabat	0–2		
1994–95	Asian Club Championship	Preliminary round	(Tajikistan) Sitora Dushanbe	4–0		
1994–95	Asian Club Championship	Preliminary round	(Kyrgyzstan) Alga Bishkek	0–1		
1998–99	Asian Club Championship	First round	(Turkmenistan) Köpetdag Aşgabat	1–4	3–0	4–4^{1}
1999–2000	Asian Club Championship	First round	(Uzbekistan) Pakhtakor Tashkent	7–0	2–5	9–5
1999–2000	Asian Club Championship	Second round	(Tajikistan) Varzob Dushanbe	4–0	1–0	5–0
1999–2000	Asian Club Championship	Quarter-finals	(Saudi Arabia) Al-Hilal	0–2		
1999–2000	Asian Club Championship	Quarter-finals	(Iran) Persepolis	0–1		
1999–2000	Asian Club Championship	Quarter-finals	(Iraq) Al Shorta	2–3		
2000–01	Asian Club Championship	First round	(Turkmenistan) Nisa Aşgabat	3–1	2–1	5–2
2000–01	Asian Club Championship	Second round	(Tajikistan) Varzob Dushanbe	4–1	3–2	7–3
2000–01	Asian Club Championship	Quarter-finals	(Saudi Arabia) Al-Hilal	0–0		
2000–01	Asian Club Championship	Quarter-finals	(Iran) Persepolis	0–0		
2000–01	Asian Club Championship	Quarter-finals	(Saudi Arabia) Al-Ittihad	2–1		
2000–01	Asian Club Championship	Semi-final	(Japan) Júbilo Iwata	0–1		
2000–01	Asian Club Championship	Third place Playoff	(Iran) Persepolis	0–2		
2003–04	UEFA Champions League	First qualifying round	(Cyprus) Omonia Nicosia	1–2	0–0	1–2
2009–10	UEFA Europa League	First qualifying round	(Hungary) Haladás	2–1	0–1	2–2 (a)
2011–12	UEFA Europa League	First qualifying round	(Poland) Jagiellonia	2–0	0–1	2–1
2011–12	UEFA Europa League	Second qualifying round	(Georgia (country)) Metalurgi Rustavi	0–2	1–1	1–3
2013–14	UEFA Europa League	First qualifying round	(Bulgaria) Levski Sofia	2–0	0–0	2–0
2013–14	UEFA Europa League	Second qualifying round	(Bosnia and Herzegovina) Široki Brijeg	3–2	0–2	3–4
2017–18	UEFA Europa League	First qualifying round	(Bulgaria) Dunav Ruse	1–0	2–0	3–0
2017–18	UEFA Europa League	Second qualifying round	(Serbia) Red Star Belgrade	1–1	0–2	1–3
2018–19	UEFA Europa League	First qualifying round	(Lithuania) FK Trakai	0–1	0−0	0–1

^{1} Irtysh were ejected from the competition for using two ineligible players.

- IFA Shield

1993: Runners-up

==== UEFA coefficient ====
The table shows the position of FC Irtysh Pavlodar (highlighted), based on their UEFA coefficient club ranking.

Rank	Team	Points
272	(Belarus) Minsk	3.725
273	(Kazakhstan) Kairat	3.625
274	(Kazakhstan) Irtysh	3.625
275	(Kazakhstan) Ordabasy	3.625
276	(Kazakhstan) Aktobe	3.625

As of 1 June 2018.

== Honours ==
=== Domestic ===
- Kazakhstan Premier League (5): 1993, 1997, 1999, 2002, 2003
- Kazakhstan Cup (1): 1998
- Kazakh SSR Cup (1): 1988

=== International ===
- IFA Shield (IFA) (Note: Fourth oldest club competition, organized by the IFA (W.B.) and played between local clubs of West Bengal and other invited ones.) : Runners-up (1993)

== Current squad ==
As of 1 August, 2026.

Note: Flags indicate national team as defined under FIFA eligibility rules; some limited exceptions apply. Players may hold more than one non-FIFA nationality.

No.	Pos.	Nation	Player
1	GK	KAZ	Miras Rikhard
4	DF	KAZ	Demiyat Slambekov
5	DF	KAZ	Bakhtiyar Toleuov
6	MF	JPN	Yushi Shimamura
7	FW	KAZ	Timur Mukhametzhanov
8	MF	KAZ	David Esimbekov
9	FW	BRA	Leo Kalil
10	FW	KAZ	Tamerlan Agimanov
11	FW	KAZ	Maksim Fedin
12	DF	KAZ	Ramazan Karimov (on loan from Kairat)
13	MF	KAZ	Nurdaulet Baybosynov (on loan from Taraz)
14	MF	KAZ	Vyacheslav Raskatov
15	DF	KAZ	Daniil Nyrkov
17	DF	NGR	Samuel Opeh
19	DF	KAZ	Artem Popov

No.	Pos.	Nation	Player
20	DF	KAZ	Adilet Usenov
21	MF	KAZ	Darkhan Berdibek (on loan from Aktobe)
24	MF	KAZ	Murodzhon Khalmatov (on loan from Ordabasy)
25	DF	SRB	Marko Jevtić
26	DF	SEN	Mamadou Mbodj
29	GK	UKR	Bohdan Sarnavskyi
31	GK	KAZ	Erkebulan Rakhmetulla
32	FW	CAN	Oluwabori Falaye
35	DF	BRA	Lucas Ramos
41	GK	KAZ	Daniil Efremenko
56	DF	BLR	Ruslan Yudenkov
66	DF	KAZ	Sagi Malikaydar
77	FW	KAZ	Alkham Nurlan
97	FW	CIV	Jean Morel Poé
98	FW	KAZ	Zikrillo Sultaniyazov

== Managers ==
Information correct as of match played 10 November 2019. Only competitive matches are counted.

Name	From	To	P	W	D	L	GS	GA	%W	Honours	Ref.
(Russia) Leonid Nazarenko		2001									
(Kazakhstan) Dmitriy Ogai	2002	2004									
(Kazakhstan) Sergei Volgin	2005	2007									
(Russia) Leonid Nazarenko	21 May 2009	31 December 2009	0	0	0	0	0	0	—		
(Kazakhstan) Serik Abdualiev	1 January 2010	31 December 2010	0	0	0	0	0	0	—		
(Kazakhstan) Talgat Baysufinov	1 January 2011	17 February 2014	0	0	0	0	0	0	—		
(Estonia) Tarmo Rüütli	6 March 2014	2 May 2014	9	2	2	5	9	14	22.22		
(Kazakhstan) Oirat Saduov	2 May 2014	27 October 2014	25	8	8	9	33	32	32.00		
(Russia) Dmitri Cheryshev	27 October 2014	8 May 2015	14	2	6	6	14	17	14.29		
(Kazakhstan) Sergey Klimov	8 May 2015	1 June 2015	3	1	1	1	6	5	33.33		
(Bulgaria) Dimitar Dimitrov	1 June 2015	9 August 2017	82	36	19	27	111	91	43.90		
(Kazakhstan) Sergei Klimov (caretaker)	10 August 2017	17 August 2017	1	0	1	0	0	0	0.00		
(Ukraine) Vyacheslav Hroznyi	17 August 2017	16 November 2017	10	3	4	3	10	10	30.00		
(Spain) Gerard Nus	21 December 2017	28 April 2018	7	3	1	3	6	11	42.86		
(Kazakhstan) Dmitry Kuznetsov (Caretaker)	28 April 2018	13 June 2018	7	4	1	2	12	3	57.14		
(Kazakhstan) Oirat Saduov	13 June 2018	10 July 2018	6	1	0	5	3	13	16.67		
(Bulgaria) Dimitar Dimitrov	10 July 2018	2 May 2019	29	9	5	15	25	35	31.03		
(Kazakhstan) Sergey Klimov (Caretaker)	2 May 2019	7 June 2019	7	2	0	5	3	12	28.57		
(Serbia) Milan Milanović	7 June 2019		19	7	4	8	22	21	36.84		

- Notes:

P – Total of played matches W – Won matches D – Drawn matches L – Lost matches GS – Goal scored GA – Goals against
%W – Percentage of matches won

Nationality is indicated by the corresponding FIFA country code(s).

== See also ==
- Kazakhstani football clubs in European competitions
