= FC Taraz =

Kazakh football club

- Full name: Football Club Taraz; Тараз футбол клубы
- Founded: 1960; 66 years ago
- Ground: Central Stadium; Taraz, Kazakhstan
- Capacity: 12,525
- League: Kazakhstan First League
- 2024: 8th
- Website: tarazfc.kz
Home colours	Away colours

FC Taraz (Kazakh: Тараз футбол клубы) is a Kazakhstani professional football club based at the Taraz Central Stadium in Taraz. A leading club in the early years of the Kazakhstan Premier League, they were champions in 1996, and Kazakhstan Cup winners in 2004.

== History ==
After initially being relegated from the Premier League at the end of the 2016 season, Taraz was reinstated on 3 February 2017 after the Football Federation of Kazakhstan ruled that Altai Semey did not meet the required entry requirements for the Premier League.

=== Names ===
- 1960 : Founded as Metallist
- 1967 : Renamed Voskhod
- 1968 : Renamed Energetik
- 1971 : Renamed Alatau
- 1975 : Renamed Khimik
- 1992 : Renamed Fosfor
- 1993 : Renamed Taraz

=== Domestic history ===
Season	League									Kazakhstan Cup	Top goalscorer		Manager
Season	Div.	Pos.	Pl.	W	D	L	GS	GA	P	Kazakhstan Cup	Name	League	Manager
1992	1st	5th	26	12	5	9	40	29	29	Runners-up	(Kazakhstan) M.Syzdykov (Kazakhstan) A.Litvinenko	11	Kurban Berdyev
1993	1st	14th	24	16	4	4	51	29	36	Runners-up	(Kazakhstan) Alexander Shmarikov	28	Kurban Berdyev
1994	1st	8th	30	12	7	11	42	34	33	Last 32	(Kazakhstan) A.Litvinenko	20	
1995	1st	2nd	30	20	2	8	61	34	62	Semi-finals	(Kazakhstan) Nurken Mazbaev	19	
1996	1st	1st	34	23	7	4	56	14	76	Quarter-finals	(Kazakhstan) G.Kainazarov	12	
1997	1st	2nd	26	18	2	6	49	18	56	Last 16	(Kazakhstan) Nurken Mazbaev	16	
1998	1st	10th	26	7	6	13	33	35	27	Last 16	(Kazakhstan) B.Eirich	9	
1999	1st	10th	30	6	5	19	25	64	23	Last 16	(Kazakhstan) Murat Tleshev	6	Vakhid Masudov
2000	1st	12th	28	7	5	16	22	47	26	Last 16	(Kazakhstan) B.Kenchimov (Kazakhstan) A.Mironov	3	Vakhid Masudov
2001	1st	15th	32	6	3	23	26	57	21	Last 16	(Kazakhstan) D.Nazarov / (Kazakhstan) V.Yakovlev (Kazakhstan) T.Sisenov / (Kazakhstan) V.Valter	4	
2002	2nd	4th								Last 32			
2003	1st	12th	32	10	4	18	35	45	34	Last 32	(Kazakhstan) Nazarov	10	Vladimir Gulyamhaydarov
2004	1st	7th	36	16	11	9	35	23	59	Winners	(Ukraine) Oleh Mochulyak	8	Yuri Konkov
2005	1st	11th	30	10	6	14	32	36	36	Semi-finals	(Kazakhstan) Nurken Mazbaev	11	Yuri Konkov
2006	1st	10th	30	9	6	15	32	34	33	Last 16	(Turkmenistan) Wýaçeslaw Krendelew (Ukraine) Oleh Mochulyak	8	Sergei Tagiyev
2007	1st	16th	30	3	6	21	16	50	15	Last 16	(Kazakhstan) Aleksey Shapurin	4	Sergei Tagiyev
2008	2nd	2nd	26	19	4	3	61	14	61	First round			Vladimir Fomichyov
2009	1st	8th	26	9	6	11	37	36	33	Second round	(Moldova) Sergiu Epureanu	7	Vladimir Fomichyov
2010	1st	9th	32	9	10	13	36	40	37	Quarter-finals	(Kyrgyzstan) Anton Zemlianukhin (Serbia) Milan Jovanović	7	Dmitry Ogai; Igor Ursach; Vait Talgayev
2011	1st	9th	32	10	5	17	30	39	25	Semi-finals	(Serbia) Nemanja Jovanović	7	Vait Talgayev
2012	1st	4th	26	14	4	8	32	30	46	Second round	(Serbia) Miroslav Lečić	7	Ljupko Petrović
2013	1st	10th	32	7	9	16	30	38	21	Runners-up	(Nigeria) Obiora Odita	5	Ljupko Petrović; Nurmat Mirzabayev; Arno Pijpers
2014	1st	10th	32	9	7	16	32	45	25	Quarter-finals	(Kazakhstan) Aleksey Shchetkin (Kazakhstan) Murat Tleshev	7	Arno Pijpers; Evgeny Yarovenko
2015	1st	9th	32	10	8	14	25	33	26	Quarter-finals	(Ukraine) Oleksandr Pyschur	9	Evgeny Yarovenko
2016	1st	11th	32	10	5	17	33	42	35	Last 16	(Senegal) Malick Mané	13	Nurmat Mirzabayev; Yuriy Maksymov
2017	1st	11th	33	8	8	17	29	50	26	Last 16	(Kazakhstan) Baktiyar Zaynutdinov	7	Vait Talgayev
2018	2nd	2nd	33	19	10	4	61	27	67	Last 16			
2019	1st	10th	33	7	8	18	28	60	29	Quarterfinal	(Togo) Serge Nyuiadzi (Georgia (country)) Elguja Lobjanidze	8	Nurken Mazbaev
2020	1st	8th	20	5	8	7	19	23	23	-	(Guinea-Bissau) Toni Silva	4	Vladimir Nikitenko
2021	1st	10th	26	7	8	11	27	34	29	Quarterfinal	(Portugal) Pedro Eugénio	7	Vardan Minasyan
2022	1st	12th	26	6	10	10	27	29	28	Semifinal	(Kazakhstan) Abylayhan Zhumabek	8	Nurken Mazbayev

=== Continental history ===
Season	Competition	Round	Club	Home	Away	Aggregate
1997–98	Asian Club Championship	First round	Bye			
1997–98	Asian Club Championship	Second round	(Turkmenistan) Nisa Aşgabat	2–2	0–2	2–4

== Honours ==
- Kazakhstan Premier League
  - Champions (1): 1996
  - Runner-up: (2): 1995, 1997
- Kazakhstan Cup
  - Winners (1): 2004
  - Runner-up: (3): 1992, 1993, 2013

== Current squad ==
As of 10 August 2025

Note: Flags indicate national team as defined under FIFA eligibility rules; some limited exceptions apply. Players may hold more than one non-FIFA nationality.

No.	Pos.	Nation	Player
1	GK	KAZ	Erkebulan Rakhmetulla
2	MF	KAZ	Azamat Erkinbek
3	DF	KAZ	Ertore Zhanybekuly
4	DF	KAZ	Madiyar Nuraly
5	MF	KAZ	Erasyl Keulimzhay
6	MF	KAZ	Dias Lesbek
7	MF	KAZ	Merey Zhambyl
8	FW	KAZ	Muslim Zhumat
9	FW	KAZ	Ulugbek Khaytmuratov
11	MF	KAZ	Olzhas Adil
12	MF	KAZ	Zhandos Umirzakov
17	FW	KAZ	Abzal Mukanbetzhanov
20	FW	KAZ	Nuraydar Askerbek
21	FW	KAZ	Yerkebulan Toybekov
22	DF	KAZ	Miras Zhaksymbetov
23	DF	KAZ	Azamat Erden

No.	Pos.	Nation	Player
27	GK	KAZ	Stanislav Samoylov
30	DF	KAZ	Maksat Amirkhanov
31	MF	KAZ	Shanzar Kemelbek
33	DF	KAZ	Zhalgas Zhaksylykov
47	MF	KAZ	David Dertsap
50	DF	KAZ	Tair Nurseitov
70	FW	KAZ	Ersultan Bayten
71	MF	KAZ	Dias Andyrmash
74	GK	KAZ	Madiyar Mergenbaev
77	FW	KAZ	Alisher Suley
79	MF	KAZ	Daulet Musretbek
82	DF	KAZ	Adilet Omey
91	GK	KAZ	Zhandar Zhangaliev
95	GK	KAZ	Sanzhar Rakhmatilya
99	MF	KAZ	Azizzhon Berdiev

== Managers ==
- (Turkmenistan) Kurban Berdyev (1986–89; 1991–92)
- (Kazakhstan) Vakhid Masudov (Aug 1999 – June 00)
- (Tajikistan) Vladimir Gulyamhaydarov (2003)
- (Kazakhstan) Yuri Konkov (1 January 2004 – 24 August 2005)
- (Kazakhstan) Sergei Tagiyev (2006 – 7 May)
- (Kazakhstan) Vladimir Fomichyov (2008–10)
- (Kazakhstan) Dmitriy Ogai (1 January 2010 – 30 November 2010)
- (Moldova) Igor Ursachi (25 June 2010 – 1 September 2010)
- (Kazakhstan) Vait Talgayev (2010–2011)
- (Serbia) Ljupko Petrović (1 November 2011 – 14 May 2013)
- (Kazakhstan) Nurmat Mirzabaev (interim) (16 May 2013 – 7 June 2013)
- (Netherlands) Arno Pijpers (8 June 2013 – 10 June 2014)
- (Ukraine) Evgeny Yarovenko (10 June 2014 – 11 November 2015)
- (Kazakhstan) Nurmat Mirzabayev (January – May 2016)
- (Ukraine) Yuriy Maksymov (15 May 2016 – 2017)
- (Ukraine) Vladimir Nikitenko (left in 2021)
- (Armenia) Vardan Minasyan (2 February 2021 – 26 October 2021)
- (Kazakhstan) Nurken Mazbayev (13 January 2022 – 21 October 2022)
- (Kazakhstan) Nurmat Mirzabayev(2022)
