= Shakhtyor Stadium (Ekibastuz) =

Multi-use stadium in Ekibastuz, Kazakhstan

Coordinates: 51°43′48″N 75°20′11″E

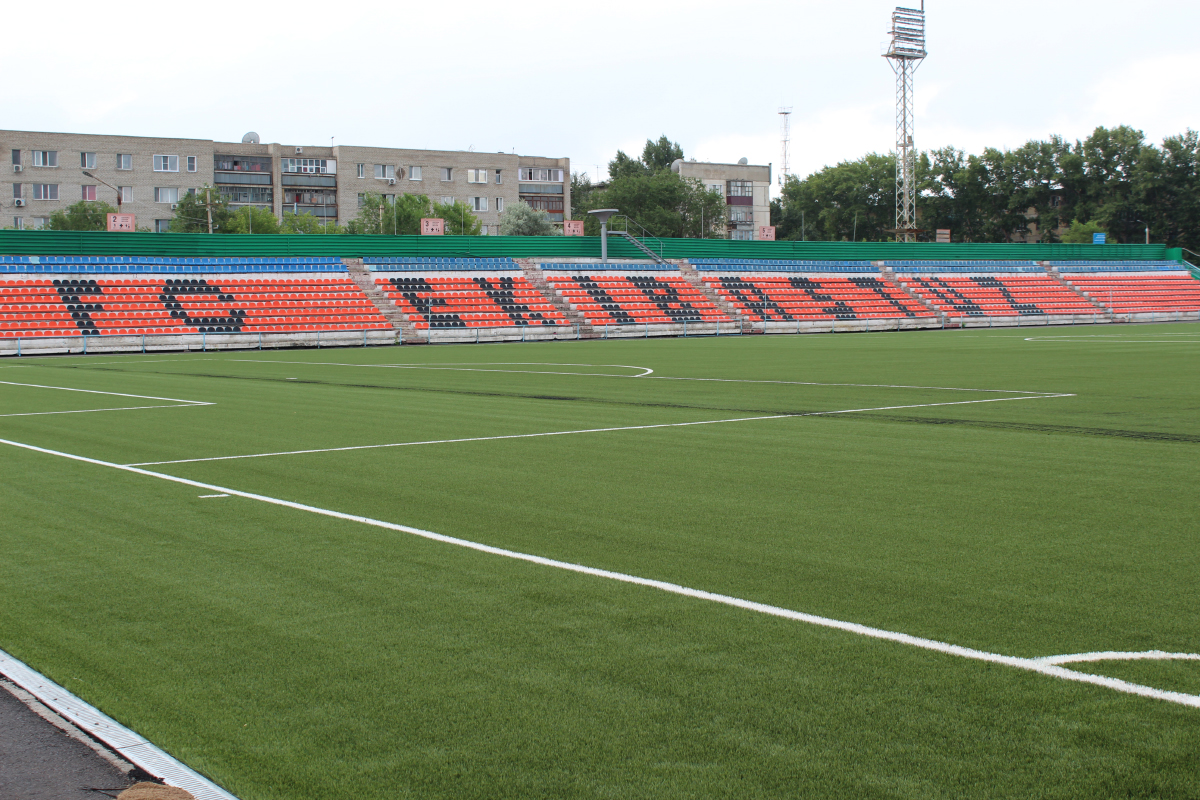
- Interactive map of Shakhtyor Stadium
- Location: Ekibastuz, Kazakhstan
- Owner: Municipality of Ekibastuz
- Capacity: 6,300
- Surface: Grass; 105m x 68m

Construction
- Opened: 1970
- Renovated: 2001

Tenant
- FC Ekibastuzets

Shakhtyor Stadium (Kazakh: Шахтёр стадионы, Shahtıor stadıony) is a multi-use stadium in Ekibastuz, Kazakhstan. It is currently used mostly for football matches and is the home stadium of FC Ekibastuzets.
