= FC Ekibastuzets =

Kazakh football club

- Full name: FC Ekibastuzets Ekibastuz
- Founded: 1979; 47 years ago
- Ground: Shakhtyor Stadium; Ekibastuz, Kazakhstan
- Capacity: 8,500
- Chairman: Rais Gainullin
- Manager: Vitaliy Sparyshev
- League: Kazakhstan Premier League
- 2007: 12th (relegated)
Home colours	Away colours

FK Ekibastuzets Ekibastuz (Kazakh: Fýtbol Klýby Ekibastuz) are a Kazakhstani football club based at the Shakhtyor Stadium in Ekibastuz.

== History ==
Ekibastuzets were founding members of the Kazakhstan Premier League.

At the end of the 2007 Premier League, they were relegated to the Kazakhstan First Division as a punishment for match fixing.

== Ekibastuzets ==
- 1979 : Founded as Ugolshik
- 1980 : Renamed Ekibastuzets
- 1993 : Renamed Batyr
- 2001 : Renamed Ekibastuzets-NK because of joint with Nasha Kampaniya
- 2002 : Renamed Ekibastuzets

== Achievements ==
- Kazakhstan First Division: 1

2002

Runner-up: Season 1993, 1998
