= Oleg Litvinenko =

Kazakhstani footballer

Personal information
- Full name: Oleg Fyodorovich Litvinenko
- Date of birth: 23 November 1973
- Place of birth: Dzhambul, Kazakh SSR, Soviet Union
- Date of death: 19 November 2007 (aged 33)
- Place of death: Taraz, Kazakhstan
- Height: 1.69 m (5 ft 7 in)
- Position: Forward

Senior career*
Years	Team	Apps	(Gls)
1990–1991	Khimik Dzhambul	13	(1)
1991	Rus Volgograd	13	(2)
1992	Fosfor Jambyl	29	(11)
1993	FC Dinamo Almaty	40	(17)
1994	Taraz	28	(20)
1995–1999	Yelimay	92	(51)
2000–2001	Kairat	31	(15)
2001	Ermis Aradippou	6	(0)
2002	Zhenis Astana	10	(1)
2002–2003	Yelimay	50	(24)
2004	Aktobe	5	(1)
2005	Alma-Ata	22	(7)
2006	Semey	8	(3)
2007	Taraz	4	(1)
Total		351	(154)

International career^{‡}
1996–2006	Kazakhstan	28	(6)
- * Club domestic league appearances and goals as of 5 November 2015 ‡ National team caps and goals as of 5 November 2015

Oleg Fyodorovich Litvinenko (Russian: Олег Фёдорович Литвиненко; 23 November 1973 – 19 November 2007) was a Kazakh international footballer from Taraz, who played as a forward.

== Career ==
=== Club ===
In 1998, Litvinenko was banned from football for one-year, after playing for FC Irtysh Pavlodar in the 1998–99 Asian Club Championship whilst not being eligible.

During Litvinenko's time in the Kazakhstan Premier League, he scored 147 goals, becoming the all-time top scorer in the tournament, until Nurbol Zhumaskaliyev beat his record.

=== International ===
Litvinenko represented Kazakhstan 28 times between 1996 and 2006, whilst also representing the Kazakhstan U-23 10 times, scoring 9 times, during the 1996 Olympic Games Qualifiers.

== Death ==
Litvinenko died on 18 November 2007, four days short of his 34th birthday. His body was found hanging from a tree in an abandoned cemetery. The cause of death was ruled as suicide.

== Career statistics ==
=== Club ===
Appearances and goals by club, season and competition
Club	Season	League			National Cup		Continental		Other		Total	
Club	Season	Division	Apps	Goals	Apps	Goals	Apps	Goals	Apps	Goals	Apps	Goals
Khimik Dzhambul	1990	Soviet Second League	2	0			-	-	-	-	2	0
Khimik Dzhambul	1991	Soviet Second League	11	1			-	-	-	-	1	1
Khimik Dzhambul	Total		13	1			-	-	-	-	13	1
Rus Volgograd	1991	Soviet Second League B	13	2			-	-	-	-	13	2
Fosfor Jambyl	1992	Top Division	29	11			-	-	-	-	29	11
FC Dinamo Almaty	1993	Top Division	40	17			-	-	-	-	40	17
Taraz	1994	Top Division	28	20			-	-	-	-	28	20
Yelimay	1995	Top Division	26	9			-	-	-	-	26	9
Yelimay	1996	Top Division	26	11					-	-	26	11
Yelimay	1997	Top Division	17	8			-	-	-	-	17	8
Yelimay	1998	Top Division	23	23			-	-	-	-	23	23
Yelimay	1999	Top Division	banned									
Yelimay	Total		92	51					-	-	92	51
Kairat	2000	Top Division	23	13			-		-		23	13
Kairat	2001	Top Division	8	2			-		-		8	2
Kairat	Total		31	15			-	-	-	-	31	15
Ermis Aradippou	2000–01	Cypriot First Division	6	0			-		-		6	0
Zhenis Astana	2002	Super League	10	1			-		-		10	1
Yelimay	2002	Super League	21	11			-		-		21	11
Yelimay	2003	Super League	29	13			-		-		29	13
Yelimay	Total		50	24			-	-	-	-	50	24
Aktobe	2004	Super League	5	1			-		-		5	1
Alma-Ata	2005	Super League	22	7			-		-		22	7
Semey	2006	Kazakhstan First Division	8	3			-		-		8	3
Taraz	2007	Super League	4	1			-		-		4	1
Career total			351	154					-	-	351	154

=== International ===
Kazakhstan national team
Year	Apps	Goals
1996	1	0
1997	5	0
1998	0	0
1999	0	0
2000	7	1
2001	5	4
2002	1	1
2003	1	0
2004	0	0
2005	5	0
2006	3	0
Total	28	6

Statistics accurate as of 5 November 2015

=== International goals ===
#	Date	Venue	Opponent	Score	Result	Competition
1.	6 April 2000	Jassim Bin Hamad Stadium, Doha, Qatar	Palestine	2-0	2–0	2000 AFC ACQ
2.	12 April 2001	Al-Shaab Stadium, Baghdad, Iraq	Nepal	1–0	6–0	2002 WC qualification
3.	12 April 2001	Al-Shaab Stadium, Baghdad, Iraq	Nepal	3–0	6–0	2002 WC qualification
4.	14 April 2001	Al-Shaab Stadium, Baghdad, Iraq	Macau	2–0	3–0	2002 WC qualification
5.	25 April 2001	Central Stadium, Almaty, Kazakhstan	Iraq	1–0	1–1	2002 WC qualification
6.	7 July 2002	Central Stadium, Almaty, Kazakhstan	Estonia	1–0	1–1	Friendly
Correct as of 22 May 2016

== Honours ==
=== Club ===
Yelimay

- Kazakhstan Top Division (2): 1995, 1998
- Kazakhstan Cup: 1995

Kairat

- Kazakhstan Cup: 1999–00, 2001

=== Individual ===
- 2005 GOAL Journal "Best Player of the year"
- Kazakhstan Top scorer: 1994, 1998
