= 1994 Kazakhstan Premier League =

Kazakhstan Top Division
- Season: 1994
- Champions: Yelimay
- Relegated: Yassi; Uralets-Arma
- Asian Club Championship: Yelimay
- Asian Cup Winners' Cup: Vostok
- Top goalscorer: Oleg Litvinenko (20)

The 1994 Kazakhstan Top Division was the third season of the Top Division, now called the Kazakhstan Premier League, the highest football league competition in Kazakhstan.

== Teams ==
With the relegation of eight teams the previous season, the withdrawal of FC Dostyk before the start of the season, and no promoted teams, the league was reduced to 16 teams, which played each other twice.

The relegated teams at the end of the 1993 season were Dinamo Almaty, Azhar Kokshetau, Munaishy, Kaisar, Metallist, Namys Almaty, Karachaganak and Taldykorgan. Tselinnik Tselinograd were renamed Tsesna Akmola and Fosfor were renamed FC Taraz before the start of the season.

=== Team overview ===
Locations of teams in the 1994 Kazakhstan Premier League

| Team | Location | Venue | Capacity |
|---|---|---|---|
| Aktyubinets | Aktobe | Central Stadium | |
| Ansat | Pavlodar | Central Stadium | |
| Batyr | Ekibastuz | Shakhtyor Stadium | |
| Bolat | Temirtau | Metallurg Stadium | |
| Gornyak | Khromtau | | |
| Kairat | Almaty | Central Stadium | |
| Khimik | Kostanay | Central Stadium | |
| Shakhter Karagandy | Karaganda | Shakhter Stadium | |
| SKIF-Ordabasy | Shymkent | Kazhymukan Munaitpasov Stadium | |
| Taraz | Taraz | Central Stadium | |
| Tsesna Akmola | Astana | Kazhymukan Munaitpasov Stadium | |
| Uralets-Arma | Oral | Petr Atoyan Stadium | |
| Vostok | Oskemen | Vostok Stadium | |
| Yelimay | Semey | Spartak Stadium | |
| Yassi | Shymkent | Kazhymukan Munaitpasov Stadium | |
| Zhiger | Shymkent | Kazhymukan Munaitpasov Stadium | |

== League table ==
| Pos | Team | Pld | W | D | L | GF | GA | GD | Pts | Qualification or relegation |
|---|---|---|---|---|---|---|---|---|---|---|
| 1 | Yelimay (C) | 30 | 20 | 7 | 3 | 70 | 29 | +41 | 67 | Qualification for the Asian Club Championship |
| 2 | Ansat | 30 | 17 | 7 | 6 | 57 | 14 | +43 | 58 | |
| 3 | Zhiger | 30 | 16 | 8 | 6 | 63 | 30 | +33 | 56 | |
| 4 | Aktyubinets | 30 | 15 | 10 | 5 | 45 | 23 | +22 | 55 | |
| 5 | SKIF-Ordabasy | 30 | 14 | 8 | 8 | 41 | 29 | +12 | 50 | |
| 6 | Shakhter Karagandy | 30 | 11 | 12 | 7 | 45 | 38 | +7 | 45 | |
| 7 | Bolat | 30 | 13 | 7 | 10 | 31 | 34 | −3 | 46 | |
| 8 | Taraz | 30 | 12 | 7 | 11 | 42 | 34 | +8 | 43 | |
| 9 | Batyr | 30 | 10 | 8 | 12 | 36 | 34 | +2 | 38 | |
| 10 | Khimik | 30 | 11 | 5 | 14 | 42 | 37 | +5 | 38 | |
| 11 | Kairat | 30 | 10 | 6 | 14 | 36 | 42 | −6 | 36 | |
| 12 | Gornyak | 30 | 8 | 6 | 16 | 29 | 60 | −31 | 30 | |
| 13 | Vostok | 30 | 8 | 6 | 16 | 39 | 58 | −19 | 30 | Qualification for the Asian Cup Winners' Cup |
| 14 | Tsesna Akmola | 30 | 6 | 7 | 17 | 24 | 48 | −24 | 25 | |
| 15 | Yassi (R) | 30 | 8 | 1 | 21 | 22 | 76 | −54 | 25 | Relegation to the Kazakhstan First Division |
| 16 | Uralets-Arma (R) | 30 | 4 | 9 | 17 | 20 | 56 | −36 | 21 | Relegation to the Kazakhstan First Division |

Source: kpfl.kz
Rules for classification: 1) points; 2) goal difference; 3) number of goals scored.
(C) Champions; (R) Relegated

== Results ==
| Home \ Away | AKT | ANS | BAT | BOL | GOR | KRT | KHI | SHA | SKI | TAR | TSE | URA | VOS | YAS | YEL | ZHI |
|---|---|---|---|---|---|---|---|---|---|---|---|---|---|---|---|---|
| Aktyubinets | | – (Note: Match result declared invalid; official home win, without goals.) | 0–0 | 1–0 | 4–1 | – | 3–0 | 1–1 | 0–0 | 3–2 | 2–0 | 2–0 | 3–0 | 8–0 | 0–1 | 1–1 |
| Ansat | 2–0 | | 4–0 | 6–0 | 3–0 | 4–1 | 1–1 | 5–0 | 2–0 | 2–0 | 2–0 | 4–0 | 6–0 | 3–0 | 1–0 | 1–1 |
| Batyr | 1–1 | 0–0 | | 1–0 | 4–0 | 2–1 | 3–1 | 1–1 | 0–1 | 3–1 | 6–2 | 0–0 | 1–0 | 5–0 | 2–2 | 0–1 |
| Bolat | 1–1 | 1–1 | 1–0 | | 1–1 | 2–0 | 1–0 | 1–0 | 2–0 | 1–0 | 2–1 | 2–0 | 1–1 | 2–0 | 1–1 | 2–2 |
| Gornyak | 1–1 | 1–0 | 0–2 | 1–0 | | 0–1 | 1–1 | 4–4 | 1–2 | 2–1 | 2–1 | 2–0 | 4–3 | 2–1 | 0–0 | 1–1 |
| Kairat | 0–3 | 0–2 | 1–0 | 0–2 | 4–1 | | 5–2 | 3–1 | 2–2 | 0–0 | 1–0 | 3–1 | 4–0 | 0–0 | 0–2 | 3–1 |
| Khimik | 2–0 | 2–1 | 6–0 | 1–0 | 2–0 | 1–0 | | 0–1 | 3–0 | 2–1 | 4–1 | 4–1 | 2–1 | 1–2 | 1–1 | 2–2 |
| Shakhter Karagandy | 1–1 | 1–3 | 0–0 | 0–1 | 5–1 | 2–1 | 1–0 | | 1–0 | 1–1 | 4–0 | 2–0 | 3–1 | 2–0 | 3–3 | 2–1 |
| SKIF-Ordabasy | 0–0 | 0–1 | 3–0 | 2–0 | 4–0 | 0–0 | 3–1 | 1–0 | | 1–0 | 3–0 | 1–0 | 4–1 | 4–1 | 2–2 | 2–1 |
| Taraz | 0–0 | 0–1 | 2–0 | 2–1 | 2–0 | 1–0 | 1–0 | 2–2 | 2–2 | | 4–0 | 1–1 | 4–1 | 4–1 | 2–0 | 1–0 |
| Tsesna Akmola | 2–2 | 0–0 | 1–0 | 0–0 | 1–0 | 2–3 | 1–0 | 0–0 | 0–0 | 0–1 | | 2–0 | 2–0 | 4–0 | 1–2 | 2–2 |
| Uralets-Arma | 2–3 | 0–0 | 1–0 | 1–2 | 2–1 | 1–1 | 1–0 | 0–0 | 1–1 | 0–0 | 1–1 | | 2–3 | 2–0 | 1–4 | 2–2 |
| Vostok | 1–3 | 1–1 | 0–0 | 5–2 | 1–2 | 0–0 | 1–1 | 2–1 | 3–0 | 3–2 | 1–1 | 3–0 | | 4–0 | 1–2 | 1–0 |
| Yassi | 1–2 | 1–0 | 0–2 | 1–2 | 1–0 | 4–2 | – | 2–3 | 1–3 | 1–2 | 3–2 | 2–0 | 2–1 | | 0–2 | 1–2 |
| Yelimay | 2–1 | 3–1 | 3–2 | 3–0 | 2–0 | 4–0 | 3–2 | 2–2 | 1–0 | 4–2 | 4–1 | 5–0 | 2–0 | 7–0 | | 3–1 |
| Zhiger | 3–0 | 1–0 | 2–1 | 2–1 | 6–0 | 2–0 | 1–0 | 1–1 | 3–0 | 2–1 | 3–0 | 5–0 | 3–0 | 7–0 | 2–0 | |

Legend: Blue = home team win; Yellow = draw; Red = away team win.

== Statistics ==
=== Top scorers ===
| Rank | Player | Club | Goals |
|---|---|---|---|
| 1 | (Kazakhstan) Oleg Litvinenko | Taraz | 20 |
| 2 | (Kazakhstan) Andrei Miroshnichenko | Aktyubinets | 19 |
| 2 | (Kazakhstan) Maksim Nizovtsev | Aktyubinets | 19 |
| 4 | (Kazakhstan) Kairat Aubakirov | Yelimay | 16 |
| 5 | (Kazakhstan) Ravshan Mukhadov | Yelimay | 15 |

== See also ==
- Kazakhstan national football team 1994
