= Alexander Bolomozhnov =

Soviet-Russian footballer

Personal information
- Full name: Alexander Fyodorovich Bolomozhnov
- Date of birth: January 2, 1962 (age 64)
- Height: 1.70 m (5 ft 7 in)
- Position: Defender

Senior career*
Years	Team	Apps	(Gls)
1987–1992	Progress Orenburg	40	(0)
1992	Strela Orenburg		
1993	FC BGS	21	(0)
- * Club domestic league appearances and goals

Alexander (Note: Sometimes transcribed to English as Aleksandr) Fyodorovich (Note: Sometimes transcribed to English as Fedorovich) Bolomozhnov (Russian: Александр Фёдорович Боломожнов; born January 2, 1962) is a Soviet and Russian football player, defender.

In 1993, he played 21 Top League matches and one game in the Kazakhstan Cup for FC BGS (Aksay).
