= 2005 Kazakhstan Premier League =

Kazakhstan Premier League
- Season: 2005
- Champions: Aktobe
- Champions League: Aktobe
- UEFA Cup: Tobol; Kairat
- UEFA Intertoto Cup: Shakhter Karagandy
- Top goalscorer: Murat Tleshev (20)

The 2005 Kazakhstan Premier League was the 14th season of the Kazakhstan Premier League, the highest football league competition in Kazakhstan, and took place between 2 April and 6 November.

== Teams ==
For the 2005 season, the league was reduced to 16, so with Semey, Kaisar, Akzhayik and Yassi-Sairam being relegated the previous season, only Bulat-MST were promoted.

Before the start of the season Aktobe-Lento became Aktobe and newly promoted Bolat CSKA became Bulat-MSK.

=== Team overview ===
Locations of teams in the 2005 Kazakhstan Premier League

Team	Location	Venue	Capacity
Aktobe	Aktobe	Central Stadium	13,200
Almaty	Almaty	Central Stadium	23,804
Atyrau	Atyrau	Munaishy Stadium	9,500
Bolat MSK	Temirtau	Metallurg Stadium	12,000
Ekibastuzets	Ekibastuz	Shakhtyor Stadium	6,300
Esil Bogatyr	Petropavl	Karasai Stadium	11,000
Irtysh	Pavlodar	Central Stadium	15,000
Kairat	Almaty	Central Stadium	23,804
Okzhetpes	Kokshetau	Okzhetpes Stadium	4,158
Ordabasy	Shymkent	Kazhimukan Munaitpasov Stadium	20,000
Shakhter Karagandy	Karagandy	Shakhter Stadium	20,000
Taraz	Taraz	Central Stadium	12,525
Tobol	Kostanay	Central Stadium	8,323
Vostok	Oskemen	Vostok Stadium	8,500
Zhenis Astana	Astana	Kazhymukan Munaitpasov Stadium	12,350
Zhetysu	Taldykorgan	Zhetysu Stadium	4,000

== League table ==
Pos	Team	Pld	W	D	L	GF	GA	GD	Pts	Qualification or relegation
1	Aktobe (C)	30	22	4	4	50	27	+23	70	Qualification for the Champions League first qualifying round
2	Tobol	30	21	6	3	53	21	+32	69	Qualification for the UEFA Cup first qualifying round
3	Kairat	30	18	8	4	56	22	+34	62	Qualification for the UEFA Cup first qualifying round
4	Shakhter Karagandy	30	19	2	9	37	22	+15	59	Qualification for the Intertoto Cup first round
5	Irtysh	30	18	3	9	51	24	+27	57	
6	Ordabasy	30	14	7	9	30	27	+3	49	
7	Esil Bogatyr	30	15	3	12	38	25	+13	48	
8	Zhenis Astana	30	11	10	9	35	23	+12	43	
9	Okzhetpes	30	11	4	15	26	32	−6	37	
10	Atyrau	30	10	7	13	32	36	−4	37	
11	Taraz	30	10	6	14	32	36	−4	36	
12	Ekibastuzets	30	8	10	12	30	32	−2	34	
13	Almaty	30	9	3	18	30	43	−13	30	
14	Vostok	30	9	1	20	24	49	−25	28	
15	Zhetysu (R)	30	4	7	19	28	60	−32	19	Relegation to the Kazakhstan First Division
16	Bulat-MST (R)	30	0	1	29	15	88	−73	1	Relegation to the Kazakhstan First Division

Source: kpfl.kz
Rules for classification: 1) points; 2) goal difference; 3) number of goals scored.
(C) Champions; (R) Relegated

== Results ==
Home \ Away	ALM	AKT	ATY	BUL	EKI	ESI	IRT	KRT	OKZ	ORD	SHA	TAR	TOB	VOS	ZHN	ZHE
Almaty		3–1	0–1	3–2	0–0	0–1	0–1	1–0	2–0	2–3	0–2	0–1	0–2	2–0	3–2	1–2
Aktobe	4–3		1–0	3–1	2–0	2–0	3–1	2–1	2–1	1–0	2–1	2–0	2–1	3–0	2–1	2–1
Atyrau	1–0	0–1		4–0	1–0	2–1	3–0	2–2	0–1	1–1	1–1	0–0	0–1	2–0	1–0	3–2
Bulat-MST	1–2	1–1	0–2		1–4	0–1	0–3	2–6	0–3	1–2	0–2	0–2	0–1	0–2	1–2	1–2
Ekibastuzets	1–1	1–2	1–1	4–1		1–0	0–0	2–2	1–0	1–0	0–1	1–0	0–0	2–0	1–1	1–1
Esil Bogatyr	0–2	0–1	0–0	7–0	2–1		1–0	2–2	2–0	1–0	1–0	3–0	1–1	1–0	1–0	4–0
Irtysh Pavlodar	1–0	1–0	1–0	3–0	1–0	2–1		0–1	3–0	2–0	6–1	5–1	1–2	3–2	1–0	4–1
Kairat	1–1	2–0	3–0	5–0	2–1	3–0	1–0		1–0	3–0	2–1	4–1	0–0	3–0	1–1	1–1
Okzhetpes	3–1	0–1	3–1	2–1	1–0	1–4	0–2	0–0		1–1	0–1	1–0	1–2	1–0	0–0	4–0
Ordabasy	1–0	0–0	2–1	1–0	2–1	2–0	1–0	0–1	2–0		2–0	1–0	1–4	3–0	0–0	2–1
Shakhter Karagandy	1–0	1–1	2–1	3–0	2–0	1–0	1–0	2–0	1–0	1–0		1–0	2–0	3–0	0–1	2–1
Taraz	2–1	3–4	6–1	3–0	1–0	1–0	1–1	0–1	0–0	0–0	1–3		0–1	0–1	1–1	3–2
Tobol	5–0	3–0	3–2	5–0	1–1	1–0	2–1	2–1	1–0	3–0	1–0	1–0		2–1	1–1	4–1
Vostok	2–0	0–2	1–0	3–0	1–1	0–1	1–5	0–2	1–2	0–1	1–0	0–2	0–2		2–1	4–2
Zhenis Astana	2–0	0–2	2–0	4–0	2–0	1–0	1–1	1–2	0–1	1–1	1–0	1–1	4–0	3–0		0–0
Zhetysu	0–2	1–1	1–1	3–2	3–4	0–2	0–2	0–3	2–0	1–1	0–1	0–2	0–0	0–2	0–1	

Legend: Blue = home team win; Yellow = draw; Red = away team win.

== Season statistics ==
=== Top scorers ===
As of match played 6 November 2005

Rank	Player	Club	Goals
1	(Kazakhstan) Murat Tleshev	Irtysh	20
2	(Kazakhstan) Aleksandr Krokhmal	Ordabasy	15
2	(Uzbekistan) Ulugbek Bakayev	Tobol	15
2	(Kazakhstan) Kairat Ashirbekov	Aktobe	15
5	(Russia) Sergei Ditkovskiy	Aktobe	14
6	(Kazakhstan) Andrei Finonchenko	Shakhter	11
6	(Kazakhstan) Nurken Mazbaev	Taraz	11
8	(Uzbekistan) Jafar Irismetov	Kairat	10
8	(Turkmenistan) Didargylyç Urazow	Irtysh	10
8	(Kazakhstan) Maksim Nizovtsev	Tobol	10
