= 1993 Kazakhstan Premier League =

Kazakhstan Top Division
- Season: 1993
- Champions: Ansat
- Relegated: Dinamo Almaty; Azhar Kokshetau; Munaishy; Kaisar; Metallist; Namys Almaty; Karachaganak; Taldykorgan
- Top goalscorer: Aleksandr Shmarikov (28)

The 1993 Kazakhstan Premier League was the second season of the Top Division, now called the Kazakhstan Premier League, the highest football league competition in Kazakhstan.

== Teams ==
Metallist, Arman and CSKA Almaty were all relegated to the Kazakhstan First Division at the end of last season. Karachaganak, Namys Almaty, Dinamo Almaty, Dostyk and Metallist were all promoted to the Kazakhstan Premier League for the first time.

Before the start of the season, Arsenal-SKIF became SKIF-Ordabasy, Aktau became Munaishy, Uralets became Uralets-Arma, Montazhnik became Yassi, Zhetysu became Taldykorgan, Traktor became Ansat, Ekibastuzets became Batyr and Zenit Kokshetau became Azhar Kokshetau.

== League format ==
Originally planned 26 teams in total. But like the season earlier, one team withdrew during the season. This time it was FC Kokshetau. All its games were annulled. The competition was split into two stages. In first stage two groups of 12 and 13 teams were formed. In second stage the best six teams of each group joined together to play in a final group for positions 1 to 12. The rest of the teams played in a group for positions 13 to 25. Teams played against each other on home-away basis in their groups. Final standings of teams did not count the results of the first stage.

== First round ==
=== Group A ===
==== League table ====
| Pos | Team | Pld | W | D | L | GF | GA | GD | Pts | Qualification |
|---|---|---|---|---|---|---|---|---|---|---|
| 1 | Dostyk | 24 | 14 | 5 | 5 | 58 | 25 | +33 | 47 | Qualification for the championship round |
| 2 | Kairat | 24 | 13 | 5 | 6 | 45 | 21 | +24 | 44 | Qualification for the championship round |
| 3 | Gornyak | 24 | 13 | 4 | 7 | 31 | 29 | +2 | 43 | Qualification for the championship round |
| 4 | SKIF-Ordabasy | 24 | 11 | 7 | 6 | 41 | 20 | +21 | 40 | Qualification for the championship round |
| 5 | Zhiger | 24 | 11 | 6 | 7 | 47 | 31 | +16 | 39 | Qualification for the championship round |
| 6 | Aktyubinets | 24 | 11 | 6 | 7 | 33 | 24 | +9 | 39 | Qualification for the championship round |
| 7 | Munaishy | 24 | 12 | 2 | 10 | 43 | 41 | +2 | 38 | Qualification for the relegation round |
| 8 | Uralets-Arma | 24 | 11 | 4 | 9 | 26 | 21 | +5 | 37 | Qualification for the relegation round |
| 9 | Fosfor | 24 | 10 | 4 | 10 | 41 | 36 | +5 | 34 | Qualification for the relegation round |
| 10 | Yassi | 24 | 7 | 3 | 14 | 33 | 54 | −21 | 24 | Qualification for the relegation round |
| 11 | Karachaganak | 24 | 6 | 4 | 14 | 28 | 62 | −34 | 22 | Qualification for the relegation round |
| 12 | Kaisar | 24 | 5 | 4 | 15 | 22 | 43 | −21 | 19 | Qualification for the relegation round |
| 13 | Taldykorgan | 24 | 3 | 4 | 17 | 26 | 67 | −41 | 13 | Qualification for the relegation round |

Source: kpfl.kz
Rules for classification: 1) points; 2) goal difference; 3) number of goals scored.

==== Results ====
| Home \ Away | AKT | DOS | FOS | GOR | KRT | KRA | KSR | MUN | SKI | TAL |
|---|---|---|---|---|---|---|---|---|---|---|
| Aktyubinets | | 3–2 | 2–1 | 4–0 | 2–1 | 0–0 | 0–1 | 0–1 | 0–0 | 0–0 |
| Dostyk | 0–0 | | 1–2 | 0–0 | 1–1 | 4–0 | 2–0 | 2–1 | 1–3 | 6–1 |
| Fosfor | 2–1 | 1–3 | | 0–1 | 1–2 | 4–3 | 1–0 | 5–0 | 0–1 | 4–0 |
| Gornyak | 2–1 | 0–3 | 1–1 | | 1–2 | 2–1 | 1–0 | 3–2 | 0–1 | 3–1 |
| Kairat | 1–2 | 3–1 | 3–1 | 0–1 | | 3–0 | 1–0 | 1–0 | 0–0 | 2–2 |
| Karachaganak | 1–3 | 1–1 | 0–3 | 0–2 | 0–3 | | 2–1 | 3–2 | 1–7 | 2–2 |
| Kaisar | 2–2 | 1–2 | 1–0 | 1–2 | 0–8 | 1–2 | | 3–3 | 2–1 | XXX (Note: Match result declared invalid; official away win, without goals.) |
| Munaishy | 1–2 | 4–1 | 4–0 | 2–0 | 0–0 | 3–1 | 3–1 | | 0–6 | 4–1 |
| SKIF-Ordabasy | 0–0 | 0–2 | 1–0 | 2–3 | 2–2 | 0–0 | 1–2 | 0–1 | | 6–1 |
| Taldykorgan | 1–6 | 0–8 | 3–5 | 3–0 | 1–2 | XXX | 0–0 | 1–5 | 2–4 | |

Legend: Blue = home team win; Yellow = draw; Red = away team win.

=== Group B ===
==== League table ====
| Pos | Team | Pld | W | D | L | GF | GA | GD | Pts | Qualification |
|---|---|---|---|---|---|---|---|---|---|---|
| 1 | Ansat | 22 | 13 | 4 | 5 | 51 | 26 | +25 | 43 | Qualification for the championship round |
| 2 | Batyr | 22 | 13 | 3 | 6 | 48 | 24 | +24 | 42 | Qualification for the championship round |
| 3 | Shakhter Karagandy | 22 | 11 | 6 | 5 | 24 | 12 | +12 | 39 | Qualification for the championship round |
| 4 | Khimik | 22 | 11 | 6 | 5 | 35 | 20 | +15 | 39 | Qualification for the championship round |
| 5 | Vostok | 22 | 12 | 3 | 7 | 31 | 21 | +10 | 39 | Qualification for the championship round |
| 6 | Tselinnik Tselinograd | 22 | 11 | 5 | 6 | 32 | 21 | +11 | 38 | Qualification for the championship round |
| 7 | Azhar Kokshetau | 22 | 12 | 2 | 8 | 35 | 31 | +4 | 38 | Qualification for the relegation round |
| 8 | Bolat | 22 | 11 | 3 | 8 | 43 | 23 | +20 | 36 | Qualification for the relegation round |
| 9 | Dinamo Almaty | 22 | 9 | 3 | 10 | 34 | 35 | −1 | 30 | Qualification for the relegation round |
| 10 | Namys Almaty | 22 | 5 | 2 | 15 | 18 | 62 | −44 | 17 | Qualification for the relegation round |
| 11 | Yelimay | 22 | 2 | 4 | 16 | 19 | 50 | −31 | 10 | Qualification for the relegation round |
| 12 | Metallist | 22 | 1 | 1 | 20 | 18 | 63 | −45 | 4 | Qualification for the relegation round |

Source: kpfl.kz
Rules for classification: 1) points; 2) goal difference; 3) number of goals scored.

==== Results ====
| Home \ Away | AZH | ANS | BAT | BOL | DYN | KHI | MZH | NAM | SHA | TSE | VOS | YEL |
|---|---|---|---|---|---|---|---|---|---|---|---|---|
| Azhar Kokshetau | | 4–3 | 4–3 | 0–2 | 0–1 | 1–2 | 2–0 | 3–1 | 1–0 | 0–0 | 3–2 | 1–2 |
| Ansat | 2–0 | | 2–3 | 2–0 | 4–2 | 0–0 | 4–1 | 3–1 | 1–0 | 0–0 | 0–3 | 3–2 |
| Batyr | 2–0 | 0–1 | | 4–1 | 1–0 | 1–1 | 2–1 | 2–3 | 0–0 | 1–2 | 3–1 | 2–0 |
| Bolat | 2–0 | 2–1 | 3–1 | | 1–2 | 0–2 | 3–1 | 6–1 | 1–3 | 1–2 | 0–2 | 0–0 |
| Dinamo Almaty | 2–3 | 1–4 | 0–3 | 2–1 | | 2–2 | 3–0 | XXX (Note: Match result declared invalid; official away win, without goals.) | 1–3 | 2–1 | 1–0 | 1–1 |
| Khimik | 0–3 | 0–3 | 0–2 | 1–1 | 2–0 | | 3–1 | 7–0 | 2–1 | 1–1 | 1–0 | 4–0 |
| Metallist | 1–3 | 1–5 | 1–3 | 1–10 | 1–3 | 0–3 | | 4–1 | 0–1 | 1–3 | 0–1 | 0–0 |
| Namys Almaty | 1–3 | 2–7 | 0–8 | 0–3 | 2–2 | 0–0 | 3–1 | | 0–3 | 0–3 | 0–1 | 2–1 |
| Shakhter Karagandy | 0–0 | 1–0 | 2–0 | 1–0 | 1–2 | 2–0 | 1–0 | 1–0 | | 0–0 | 2–0 | 3–2 |
| Tselinnik Tselinograd | 0–1 | 1–1 | 0–2 | 0–3 | 2–0 | 0–1 | 2–1 | 3–0 | 2–1 | | 1–2 | 2–0 |
| Vostok | 4–0 | 1–1 | 1–1 | 0–2 | 2–1 | 2–1 | 4–0 | 1–0 | 0–0 | 1–3 | | 1–0 |
| Yelimay | 1–3 | 1–4 | 1–4 | 0–2 | 1–6 | 0–2 | 3–2 | 0–1 | 1–1 | 2–4 | 1–2 | |

Legend: Blue = home team win; Yellow = draw; Red = away team win.

== Second round ==
=== Championship round ===
==== League table ====
| Pos | Team | Pld | W | D | L | GF | GA | GD | Pts | Qualification |
|---|---|---|---|---|---|---|---|---|---|---|
| 1 | Ansat (C) | 22 | 14 | 6 | 2 | 43 | 15 | +28 | 48 | Qualification for the Asian Club Championship |
| 2 | Batyr | 22 | 13 | 4 | 5 | 41 | 20 | +21 | 43 | |
| 3 | Gornyak | 22 | 12 | 6 | 4 | 36 | 28 | +8 | 42 | |
| 4 | Zhiger | 22 | 11 | 7 | 4 | 43 | 28 | +15 | 40 | |
| 5 | SKIF-Ordabasy | 22 | 9 | 6 | 7 | 27 | 25 | +2 | 33 | |
| 6 | Shakhter Karagandy | 22 | 8 | 6 | 8 | 25 | 29 | −4 | 30 | |
| 7 | Dostyk | 22 | 9 | 1 | 12 | 26 | 34 | −8 | 28 | |
| 8 | Khimik | 22 | 7 | 5 | 10 | 26 | 31 | −5 | 26 | |
| 9 | Aktyubinets | 22 | 5 | 7 | 10 | 27 | 31 | −4 | 22 | |
| 10 | Vostok | 22 | 7 | 2 | 13 | 26 | 40 | −14 | 23 | |
| 11 | Kairat | 22 | 5 | 3 | 14 | 23 | 41 | −18 | 18 | |
| 12 | Tselinnik Tselinograd | 22 | 4 | 3 | 15 | 21 | 42 | −21 | 15 | |

Source: kpfl.kz
Rules for classification: 1) points; 2) goal difference; 3) number of goals scored.
(C) Champions

==== Results ====
| Home \ Away | AKT | ANS | BAT | DOS | GOR | KHI | KRT | SHA | SKI | TSE | VOS | ZHI |
|---|---|---|---|---|---|---|---|---|---|---|---|---|
| Aktyubinets | | 0–1 | 3–3 | 1–2 | 2–0 | 1–1 | 2–2 | 0–0 | 1–3 | 1–1 | 0–1 | 1–2 |
| Ansat | 2–1 | | 1–1 | 2–1 | 0–1 | 1–1 | 4–0 | 2–2 | 2–0 | 4–0 | 1–0 | 1–1 |
| Batyr | 2–0 | 1–2 | | 1–1 | 1–1 | 2–0 | 2–1 | 5–0 | 1–2 | 1–0 | 3–0 | 0–1 |
| Dostyk | 1–3 | 1–3 | 1–2 | | 0–1 | 3–2 | 1–0 | 0–1 | 1–0 | 3–0 | 1–2 | 0–3 |
| Gornyak | 2–1 | 1–4 | 2–1 | 2–0 | | 2–2 | 2–1 | 0–1 | 2–2 | 0–0 | 3–0 | 3–3 |
| Khimik | 0–2 | 0–2 | 1–3 | 5–1 | 1–2 | | 2–1 | 1–1 | 1–0 | 2–1 | 2–0 | 1–0 |
| Kairat | 0–2 | 2–2 | 0–2 | 1–4 | 1–3 | 0–1 | | 0–2 | 1–2 | 1–0 | 1–2 | 1–3 |
| Shakhter Karagandy | 1–0 | 0–1 | 1–2 | 0–1 | 0–1 | 2–1 | 0–2 | | 0–2 | 2–2 | 2–1 | 2–1 |
| SKiF-Ordabasy | 2–2 | XXX (Note: Match result (1–1) declared invalid; regular home win, without goals.) | 0–3 | 2–0 | 4–1 | 1–1 | 0–0 | 1–1 | | 3–1 | 0–2 | 0–0 |
| Tselinnik Tselinograd | 1–2 | 0–4 | 2–1 | 0–1 | 1–2 | 3–0 | 2–3 | 1–3 | 1–0 | | 1–3 | 1–2 |
| Vostok | 2–0 | 1–3 | 0–1 | 0–2 | 1–3 | 1–0 | 2–3 | 2–2 | 1–3 | 1–3 | | 3–5 |
| Zhiger | 2–2 | 1–1 | 1–3 | 3–1 | 2–2 | 2–1 | 1–2 | 3–2 | 3–0 | 3–0 | 1–1 | |

Legend: Blue = home team win; Yellow = draw; Red = away team win.

=== Relegation round ===
==== League table ====
| Pos | Team | Pld | W | D | L | GF | GA | GD | Pts | Relegation |
|---|---|---|---|---|---|---|---|---|---|---|
| 13 | Bolat | 24 | 16 | 5 | 3 | 43 | 15 | +28 | 53 | |
| 14 | Fosfor | 24 | 16 | 4 | 4 | 51 | 29 | +22 | 52 | |
| 15 | Uralets-Arma | 24 | 14 | 5 | 5 | 41 | 12 | +29 | 47 | |
| 16 | Yassi | 24 | 15 | 3 | 6 | 44 | 30 | +14 | 48 | |
| 17 | Yelimay | 24 | 13 | 4 | 7 | 32 | 35 | −3 | 43 | |
| 18 | Dinamo Almaty (R) | 24 | 10 | 9 | 5 | 43 | 29 | +14 | 39 | Relegation to the Kazakhstan First Division |
| 19 | Azhar Kokshetau (R) | 24 | 11 | 6 | 7 | 49 | 30 | +19 | 39 | Relegation to the Kazakhstan First Division |
| 20 | Munaishy (R) | 24 | 11 | 3 | 10 | 41 | 36 | +5 | 36 | Relegation to the Kazakhstan First Division |
| 21 | Kaisar (R) | 24 | 10 | 2 | 12 | 30 | 42 | −12 | 32 | Relegation to the Kazakhstan First Division |
| 22 | Metallist (R) | 24 | 4 | 6 | 14 | 14 | 34 | −20 | 18 | Relegation to the Kazakhstan First Division |
| 23 | Namys Almaty (R) | 24 | 3 | 3 | 18 | 21 | 55 | −34 | 12 | Relegation to the Kazakhstan First Division |
| 24 | Karachaganak (R) | 24 | 3 | 3 | 18 | 26 | 49 | −23 | 12 | Relegation to the Kazakhstan First Division |
| 25 | Taldykorgan (R) | 23 | 2 | 3 | 18 | 16 | 55 | −39 | 9 | Relegation to the Kazakhstan First Division |

Source: kpfl.kz
Rules for classification: 1) points; 2) goal difference; 3) number of goals scored.
(R) Relegated

==== Results ====
| Home \ Away | AZH | BOL | DYN | FOS | KSR | KRA | MZH | MUN | NAM | TAL | URA | YAS | YEL |
|---|---|---|---|---|---|---|---|---|---|---|---|---|---|
| Azhar Kokshetau | | 1–1 | 0–0 | 1–2 | 1–3 | 2–1 | 0–0 | 1–2 | 3–1 | 8–1 | 0–1 | 2–0 | 2–3 |
| Bolat | 1–1 | | 2–1 | 1–1 | 1–0 | 1–0 | 2–0 | 1–0 | 4–0 | 3–1 | 1–0 | 0–2 | 6–0 |
| Dynamo Almaty | 1–4 | 1–1 | | 1–1 | 2–2 | 3–2 | 1–1 | 3–0 | 7–3 | 5–0 | 1–2 | 2–2 | 1–0 |
| Fosfor | 3–1 | 1–1 | 3–2 | | 3–0 | 5–1 | 1–0 | 0–5 | 2–0 | 3–0 | 0–2 | 2–1 | 0–2 |
| Kaisar | 0–2 | 0–2 | 0–0 | 1–2 | | 2–1 | 3–0 | 2–1 | 1–3 | 0–1 | 0–6 | 1–2 | 2–1 |
| Karachaganak | 2–3 | 0–1 | 2–3 | 1–2 | 4–1 | | XXX (Note: Match not played; official away win, without goals.) | 1–4 | 3–2 | 0–0 | 0–4 | 3–4 | 1–2 (Note: Match result (1–1) declared invalid; match replayed (1–2).) |
| Metallist | 3–3 | 0–2 | 0–1 | 0–4 | 1–2 | 1–2 | | 1–1 | 1–0 | 2–1 | XXX (Note: Match not played; regular home win, without goals.) | 1–2 | 0–2 |
| Munaishy | 0–2 | 0–4 | 1–1 | 3–5 | 5–1 | 3–0 | XXX | | 1–1 | 1–0 | 1–2 | 1–3 | 5–3 |
| Namys Almaty | 1–4 | XXX | 0–2 (Note: Match result (2–2) declared invalid; match replayed (0–2).) | 1–3 | 0–2 | 3–0 | 0–0 | 2–3 | | 0–4 | 0–5 | 1–2 | 0–1 |
| Taldykorgan | 1–4 | 0–2 | 1–3 | 2–4 | 1–3 | 1–1 | 1–1 | 0–2 | 0–1 | | 0–2 | 0–2 | 0–2 |
| Uralets-ARMA | 1–3 | 1–0 | 1–0 | 0–0 | 0–1 | 1–1 | 1–0 | 1–0 | 1–1 | 2–0 | | 0–1 | 6–0 |
| Yassi | 1–0 | 1–4 | 1–2 | 3–1 | 3–2 | 1–0 | 2–0 | 0–2 | 4–0 | 3–1 | 2–2 | | 0–1 |
| Yelimay | 1–1 | 4–2 | 0–0 | 0–3 | 0–1 | XXX | 3–2 | 2–0 | 2–1 | 1–0 | 0–0 | 2–2 | |

Legend: Blue = home team win; Yellow = draw; Red = away team win.

== Statistics ==
=== Top scorers ===
| Rank | Player | Club | Goals |
|---|---|---|---|
| 1 | (Kazakhstan) Aleksandr Shmarikov | Taraz | 28 |
| 2 | (Kazakhstan) Nikolay Kurganskiy | Batyr | 26 |
| 3 | (Kazakhstan) Pavel Demyan | Bulat | 25 |
| 4 | (Kazakhstan) Sergei Kalabukhin | Azhar | 23 |
| 5 | (Kazakhstan) Konstantin Kucheryavykh | Tselinnik | 22 |
| 6 | (Kazakhstan) Askar Abildaev | Kairat | 21 |
| 7 | (Kazakhstan) Viktor Antonov | Ansat | 20 |
| 7 | (Kazakhstan) Andrei Miroshnichenko | Aktyubinets | 20 |
| 7 | (Kazakhstan) Vladislav Kazankov | Yassi | 20 |
| 7 | (Kazakhstan) Sergei Krasnobaev | Azhar | 20 |
| 7 | (Kazakhstan) Erkin Sultanov | Munaishy | 20 |
| 7 | (Kazakhstan) Vyacheslav Suslitsyn | Karachaganak | 20 |
