= 2004 Kazakhstan Premier League =

Kazakhstan Premier League
- Season: 2004
- Champions: Kairat
- Champions League: Kairat
- Top goalscorer: Ulugbek Bakayev (22)

The 2004 Kazakhstan Premier League was the 13th season of the Kazakhstan Premier League, the highest football league competition in Kazakhstan, and took place between 3 April and 2 November.

== Teams ==
For the 2004 season, the league was expanded to 19 teams from 17. This meant that Almaty and FC Yassi were promoted to the Premier League, and no teams were relegated the previous season.

Before the start of the season Yelimay were renamed Semey, Batys became Akzhayik, Esil Kokshetau became Okzhetpes and promoted teams Tsesna and Yassi became Alma-Ata and Yassi Sairam.

Only Kairat obtained a UEFA license for the 2005/2006 season.

=== Team overview ===
Team	Location	Venue	Capacity
Aktobe-Lento	Aktobe	Central Stadium	13,200
Akzhayik	Oral	Petr Atoyan Stadium	8,320
Atyrau	Atyrau	Munaishy Stadium	9,500
Ekibastuzets	Ekibastuz	Shakhtyor Stadium	6,300
Okzhetpes	Kokshetau	Okzhetpes Stadium	4,158
Esil Bogatyr	Petropavl	Karasai Stadium	11,000
Irtysh	Pavlodar	Central Stadium	15,000
Kairat	Almaty	Central Stadium	23,804
Kaisar	Kyzylorda	Gany Muratbayev Stadium	7,500
Ordabasy	Shymkent	Kazhimukan Munaitpasov Stadium	20,000
Semey	Semey	Spartak Stadium	
Shakhter Karagandy	Karagandy	Shakhter Stadium	20,000
Taraz	Taraz	Central Stadium	12,525
Tobol	Kostanay	Central Stadium	8,323
Alma-Ata	Almaty	Central Stadium	23,804
Vostok	Oskemen	Vostok Stadium	8,500
Yassi Sairam	Shymkent	Kazhymukan Munaitpasov Stadium	20,000
Zhenis Astana	Astana	Kazhymukan Munaitpasov Stadium	12,350
Zhetysu	Taldykorgan	Zhetysu Stadium	4,000

== League table ==
Pos	Team	Pld	W	D	L	GF	GA	GD	Pts	Qualification or relegation
1	Kairat (C)	36	25	8	3	70	21	+49	83	Qualification for the Champions League first qualifying round
2	Irtysh	36	24	7	5	56	16	+40	79	
3	Tobol	36	22	11	3	87	27	+60	77	
4	Aktobe-Lento	36	22	8	6	52	19	+33	74	
5	Atyrau	36	20	11	5	49	31	+18	71	
6	Esil Bogatyr	36	18	5	13	53	40	+13	59	
7	Taraz	36	16	11	9	35	23	+12	59	
8	Ekibastuzets	36	17	7	12	42	27	+15	58	
9	Shakhter Karagandy	36	16	9	11	44	28	+16	57	
10	Zhenis Astana (Note: Zhenis deducted 3 points due to a violation of transfer rules.)	36	15	6	15	45	44	+1	48	
11	Okzhetpes (Note: Okzhetpes were penalized with a technical loss (0-3), due to fielding an ineligible player.)	36	10	13	13	26	39	−13	43	
12	Vostok	36	11	7	18	42	54	−12	40	
13	Zhetysu	36	11	7	18	34	55	−21	40	
14	Ordabasy	36	11	7	18	37	43	−6	40	
15	Yassi-Sairam (R)	36	9	8	19	30	49	−19	35	Relegation to the Kazakhstan First Division
16	Kaisar (Note: Kaisar were penalized with ten technical losses, due to leaving a match unfinished.) (R)	36	9	4	23	24	61	−37	31	Relegation to the Kazakhstan First Division
17	Akzhayik (Note: Akzhayik were penalized with two technical losses, due to not paying player salaries.) (R)	36	7	4	25	24	83	−59	25	Relegation to the Kazakhstan First Division
18	Alma-Ata	36	4	8	24	22	53	−31	20	
19	Semey (R)	36	4	1	31	25	84	−59	13	Relegation to the Kazakhstan First Division

Source: kpfl.kz
Rules for classification: 1) points; 2) goal difference; 3) number of goals scored.
(C) Champions; (R) Relegated

== Results ==
Home \ Away	ALM	AKZ	AKT	ATY	EKI	ESI	IRT	KRT	KSR	OKZ	ORD	SEM	SHA	TAR	TOB	VOS	YAS	ZHN	ZHE
Almaty		1–0	0–1	0–1	0–3	1–3	2–3	0–1	3–0 (Note: Due to the abandonment of the field and the rude treatment of the referee in the match against Esil Bogatyr and Kaisar was dismissed after the 29th round of the competition; the remaining 9 games were declared 0–3 regular defeats.)	1–2	0–0	4–0	0–3	1–0	0–0	0–1	2–3	1–2	1–1
Akzhayik	1–1		0–3	0–1	2–1	2–2	0–2	0–2	3–0	2–0	0–3	0–3 (Note: After the 26th match day, Akzhayik was kicked out of the competition for repeated violations of the rules; the remaining 2 games were declared 0–3 regular defeats.)	0–2	1–0	0–1	0–3	0–1	1–2	1–0
Aktobe	3–0	4–1		1–0	0–1	3–1	0–1	1–3	1–0	1–0	2–1	3–1	0–0	2–0	1–1	3–2	1–0	0–0	4–0
Atyrau	3–0	2–1	0–0		0–0	2–1	1–0	2–0	3–1	3–1	2–0	2–0	1–1	4–2	4–1	1–0	1–0	2–0	2–0
Ekibastuzets	1–0	1–1	0–1	4–0		2–1	1–2	1–0	2–1	0–0	3–0	2–1	2–0	1–0	0–0	0–1	2–0	2–0	1–2
Esil Bogatyr	1–0	2–0	0–2	0–0	1–0		1–1	1–3	2–0	4–1	2–0	1–0	2–0	4–1	1–4	5–0	3–0	2–1	4–3
Irtysh Pavlodar	0–0	6–0	2–1	0–0	1–0	3–0		1–0	1–0	1–0	1–0	3–0	3–0	0–0	1–2	4–0	3–0	1–0	2–1
Kairat	2–1	7–1	1–1	1–1	2–0	2–0	2–1		1–0	6–1	3–0	6–0	0–0	2–0	2–2	2–1	3–0	3–2	1–0
Kaisar	1–0	3–1	1–1	0–0	2–1	1–0	1–2	0–1		3–1	2–0	0–3	0–3	0–0	1–3	0–3	0–3	0–3	1–0
Okzhetpes	0–0	0–0	0–0	0–0	0–3 (Note: Match awarded.)	0–0	0–0	0–0	2–0		1–0	2–1	0–0	0–1	1–1	1–0	2–0	1–2	3–0
Ordabasy	3–1	5–0	0–0	1–1	0–1	1–2	1–0	0–0	3–0	0–1		2–0	1–4	1–1	1–1	2–1	1–3	1–3	2–1
Semey	2–1	2–0	0–2	0–1	0–2	1–2	0–2	0–2	2–3	0–3	0–3		1–2	0–1	2–3	0–4	2–2	1–2	0–1
Shakhter Karagandy	0–0	2–0	0–2	5–0	2–0	2–0	1–0	0–1	0–1	0–0	1–0	6–0		1–1	1–1	1–0	2–0	2–0	1–0
Taraz	1–0	3–0	0–2	1–0	0–0	1–0	0–0	0–0	3–0	3–0	0–0	1–0	1–0		2–0	3–0	2–0	1–0	0–0
Tobol	5–0	9–0	1–0	1–1	2–0	1–0	0–0	3–3	4–0	3–0	1–0	4–0	4–0	2–0		5–0	2–1	6–1	6–1
Vostok	1–0	0–1	1–2	2–2	1–2	0–2	1–3	1–2	2–2	1–1	2–1	4–1	1–0	1–1	0–4		0–0	0–0	5–0
Yassi-Sayram	2–0	5–2	0–2	4–1	1–1	0–0	0–3	0–2	1–0	0–1	0–1	2–0	1–1	0–1	0–3	0–0		0–0	0–0
Zhenis Astana	2–0	1–2	0–2	1–2	2–2	1–2	1–2	0–3	1–0	2–0	0–2	2–0	3–0	0–0	3–1	2–1	3–1		3–0
Zhetysu	1–1	3–1	1–0	2–3	1–0	1–0	0–1	0–1	1–0	1–1	3–1	4–2	2–1	1–4	0–0	1–2	2–0	0–0	

Legend: Blue = home team win; Yellow = draw; Red = away team win.

== Season statistics ==
=== Top scorers ===
As of match played 2 November 2004

Rank	Player	Club	Goals
1	(Uzbekistan) Ulugbek Bakayev	Tobol	22
1	(Kazakhstan) Arsen Tlekhugov	Kairat	22
3	(Kazakhstan) Nurbol Zhumaskaliyev	Tobol	19
4	(Kazakhstan) Maksim Nizovtsev	Tobol	17
5	(Kazakhstan) Alibek Buleshev	Kairat	14
5	(Russia) Vyacheslav Yeremeev	Atyrau	14
7	(Kazakhstan) Yuri Zvonarenko	Ordabasy/Zhetysu	13
8	(Uzbekistan) Jafar Irismetov	Kairat	12
8	(Kazakhstan) Murat Tleshev	Irtysh	12
8	(Russia) Alexei Kosolapov	Tobol	12
