= Kazakhstan Premier League =

Men's top division football league in Kazakhstan

- Founded: 1992; 34 years ago
- Country: Kazakhstan
- Confederation: AFC (Asia) 1992 – 2002; UEFA (Europe) 2002 –
- Number of clubs: 16
- Level on pyramid: 1
- Relegation to: First Division
- Domestic cup(s): Kazakhstan Cup; Kazakhstan League Cup; Kazakhstan Super Cup
- International cup(s): UEFA Champions League; UEFA Conference League
- Current champions: Ordabasy (2nd title) (2026)
- Most championships: Astana (7 titles)
- Broadcasters: Domestic; Qazsport; International; Eleven Sports; OneFootball
- Website: kpl.kz kffleague.kz
- Current: 2026 Kazakhstan Premier League

The Kazakhstan Professional Football League (Kazakh: Қазақстан Премьер Лигасы, romanized: Qazaqstan Premer Ligasy), commonly referred to as the Kazakh Premier League or simply the Premier League, is a professional association football league in Kazakhstan and the highest level of the Kazakh football league system.

The league is controlled by the Football Federation of Kazakhstan and was set up in 1992. The league operates on a system of promotion and relegation with the Kazakh First Division and starts in spring and finishes in late autumn because of the low temperatures in the winter, with each championship corresponding to a calendar year. The majority of matches have been played at weekends in recent seasons.

From 1994 to 2001, the league's better clubs competed in the Asian Football Confederation clubs' competitions. Starting from 2001, the Kazakhstani clubs compete in the UEFA clubs' competitions.

== Name changes ==
- Top Division (1992–2001)
- Super League (2002–2007)
- Premier League (2008–present)

== Current clubs ==
The following teams are competing in the 2025 season:

Team	Location	Venue	Capacity
Aktobe	Aktobe	Central Stadium	12,729
Astana	Astana	Astana Arena	30,200
Atyrau	Atyrau	Munaishy Stadium	8,900
Elimai	Semey	Spartak Stadium	8,000
Jenis	Astana	Astana Arena	30,200
Jetisu	Taldykorgan	Samat Suyumbayev Stadium	4,000
Kairat	Almaty	Central Stadium	23,804
Kaisar	Kyzylorda	Gany Muratbayev Stadium	7,500
Kyzylzhar	Petropavl	Karasai Stadium	11,000
Okzhetpes	Kokshetau	Torpedo Stadium	4,100
Ordabasy	Shymkent	Kazhymukan Munaitpasov Stadium	20,000
Tobol	Kostanay	Central Stadium	9,500
Turan	Turkistan	Turkistan Arena	7,000
Ulytau	Jezkazgan	Metallurg Stadium	2,500

== Soviet winners of republican level ==
Note that some teams such as Kairat Almaty participated in the upper leagues of the Soviet annual football competition. There was no solidly established independent Kazakh championship and the republican winner was conditionally picked by the Football Federation of Kazakh SSR. Since 1936 there was taken places republican football competition among sports societies and agencies and later among "collectives of physical culture" (CPhC → KFK). Since establishment of the Class B republican competitions in 1960s, there were competitions for the Kazakhstani teams of masters organized sporadically often with teams from Kyrgyzstan. From 1980, the champion of the Soviet Kazakhstan was also awarded to "teams of masters" (professional teams) competing in football competitions of the Soviet Second League.

- 1936 : Alma-Aty City
- 1937 : Dinamo Alma-Ata
- 1938 : Dinamo Alma-Ata
- 1939–45 : No Championship
- 1946 : Dinamo Alma-Ata
- 1947 : Lokomotiv Jambul
- 1948 : Trudovye Rezervy Alma-Ata
- 1949 : Dinamo Karaganda
- 1950 : Alma-Aty City
- 1951 : Meliorator Chimkent
- 1952 : Meliorator Chimkent
- 1953 : Meliorator Chimkent
- 1954 : Dinamo Alma-Ata
- 1955 : Dinamo Alma-Ata
- 1956 : Alma-Aty City
- 1957 : Stroitel Alma-Ata
- 1958 : Spartak Alma-Ata
- 1959 : Spartak Alma-Ata
- 1960 : Yenbek Guryev
- 1961 : Avangard Petropavlovsk
- 1962 : ADK Alma-Ata
- 1963 : Tselinnik Semipalatinsk
- 1964 : ADK Alma-Ata
- 1965 : ADK Alma-Ata
- 1966 : Aktyubinets Aktyubinsk
- 1967 : Torpedo Kokchetav
- 1968 : Gornyak Jezkangan
- 1969 : Shakhtyor Saran'
- 1970 : Stroitel Temir-Tau
- 1971 : Yenbek Jezkangan
- 1972 : Traktor Pavlodar
- 1973 : Yenbek Jezkangan
- 1974 : Gornyak Nikol'sky
- 1975 : Meliorator Chimkent
- 1976 : Khimik Stepnogorsk
- 1977 : Khimik Stepnogorsk
- 1978 : Trud Shevchenko
- 1979 : Khimik Stepnogorsk
- 1980 : Meliorator Chimkent
- 1981 : Burevestnik Kustanay

Zone 7 (3rd level, included teams from other republics)

- 1980 : Traktor Pavlodar
- 1981 : Aktyubinets Aktyubinsk

Zone 8 (3rd level)

- 1982 : Shakhtyor Karaganda
- 1983 : Shakhtyor Karaganda
- 1984 : Tselinnik Tselinograd
- 1985 : Meliorator Chimkent
- 1986 : Meliorator Chimkent
- 1987 : Meliorator Chimkent
- 1988 : Traktor Pavlodar
- 1989 : Traktor Pavlodar

Zone 8 (4th level)

- 1990 : Vostok Ust'-Kamenogorsk
- 1991 : Aktyubinets Aktyubinsk

Sources:

- Kazakhstan – List of Champions. RSSSF
- The Kazakh SSR Football Championship (Чемпионат Казахской ССР). Footballfacts. (in Russian)
- The Kazakh SSR Football Championship D2 (Чемпионат Казахской ССР D2). Footballfacts. (in Russian)

=== Best teams in republican competitions ===
- 7 – Meliorator Chimkent (1951, 1952, 1953, 1975, 1985, 1986, 1987)
- 5 – Dinamo Alma-Ata (1937, 1938, 1946, 1954, 1955)
- 4 – Traktor Pavlodar (1972, 1980, 1988, 1989)
- 3 – Alma-Ata {collective city team} (1936, 1950, 1956)
- 3 – ADK Alma-Ata (1962, 1964, 1965)
- 3 – Khimik Stepnogorsk (1976, 1977, 1979)
- 3 – Yenbek Jezkangan (1968, 1971, 1973)
- 3 – Aktyubinets Aktyubinsk (1966, 1981, 1991)
- 2 – Spartak Alma-Ata (1958, 1959)
- 2 – Shakhter Karaganda (1982, 1983)
- 1 – Lokomotiv Jambul (1947)
- 1 – Trudovye Rezervy Alma-Ata (1948)
- 1 – Dinamo Karaganda (1949)
- 1 – Stroitel Alma-Ata (1957)
- 1 – Yenbek Guryev (1960)
- 1 – Avangard Petropavlovsk (1961)
- 1 – Tselinnik Semipalatinsk (1963)
- 1 – Torpedo Kokchetav (1967)
- 1 – Shakhter Saran (1969)
- 1 – Stroitel Temir-Tau (1970)
- 1 – Gornyak Nikol'sky (1974)
- 1 – Trud Shevchenko (1978)
- 1 – Tselinnik Tselinograd (1984)
- 1 – Vostok Ust'-Kamenogorsk (1990)

== Kazakhstan League Seasons ==
Season	Champion	Runner-up	Third Place	Top Scorer(s) – Goals	Best Player
1992	Kairat	Ordabasy (Arsenal SKIF)	Irtysh (Traktor)	(Kazakhstan) Kogai (KSR) – 21	(Kazakhstan) Volgin (KRT)
1993	Irtysh (Ansat)	Ekibastuzets (Batyr)	Gornyak	(Kazakhstan) Shmarikov (TAR) – 28	(Kazakhstan) Kurganskiy (EKI)
1994	Elimai	Irtysh (Ansat)	Ordabasy (Zhiger)	(Kazakhstan) Litvinenko (TAR) – 20	(Kazakhstan) Musataev (ORD)
1995	Elimai	Taraz	Shakhter	(Kazakhstan) Miroshnichenko (ELI) – 23	(Kazakhstan) Miroshnichenko (ELI)
1996	Taraz	Irtysh	Elimai	(Kazakhstan) Antonov (IRT) – 21	(Kazakhstan) Voskoboynikov (TAR)
1997	Irtysh	Taraz	Kairat	(Kazakhstan) Mazbaev (TAR) – 16	(Kazakhstan) Voskoboynikov (TAR)
1998	Elimai	Ekibastuzets (Batyr)	Irtysh	(Kazakhstan) Litvinenko (ELI) – 14	(Kazakhstan) Voskoboynikov (KSR)
1999	Irtysh	Kyzylzhar (Access Esil)	Kairat	(Turkmenistan) Agabaýew (KRT) – 24	(Kazakhstan) Avdeev (KYZ)
2000	Jenis	Kyzylzhar (Access GG)	Irtysh	(Brazil) Mendes (IRT) – 21	(Kazakhstan) Avdeev (KYZ)
2001	Jenis	Atyrau	Kyzylzhar (Esil B)	(Kazakhstan) Tlekhugov (JEN) – 30	(Kazakhstan) Tlekhugov (JEN)
2002	Irtysh	Atyrau	Tobol	(Kazakhstan) Lunev (SHA) – 16	(Kazakhstan) Lovchev (JEN)
2003	Irtysh	Tobol	Jenis	(Kazakhstan) Finonchenko (SHA) – 18	(Kazakhstan) Zhumaskaliyev (TOB)
2004	Kairat	Irtysh	Tobol	(Uzbekistan) Bakaev (TOB) / (Kazakhstan) Tlekhugov (KRT) – 22	(Kazakhstan) Smakov (KRT)
2005	Aktobe	Tobol	Kairat	(Kazakhstan) Tleshev (IRT) – 20	(Kazakhstan) Zhumaskaliyev (TOB)
2006	Jenis (Astana)	Aktobe	Tobol	(Uzbekistan) Irismetov (ALM) – 17	(Kazakhstan) David Loria (JEN)
2007	Aktobe	Tobol	Shakhter	(Uzbekistan) Irismetov (ALM) – 17	(Kazakhstan) Smakov (AKT)
2008	Aktobe	Tobol	Irtysh	(Kazakhstan) Tleshev (IRT) – 13	(Kazakhstan) Smakov (AKT)
2009	Aktobe	Astana (Lokomotiv)	Shakhter	(Kazakhstan) Tleshev (AKT) / (Turkmenistan) Baýramow (TOB) – 20	(Kazakhstan) Smakov (AKT)
2010	Tobol	Aktobe	Irtysh	(Uzbekistan) Bakaev (TOB) – 16	(Kazakhstan) Zhumaskaliyev (TOB)
2011	Shakhter	Jetisu	Aktobe	(Uzbekistan) Bakaev (JET) – 18	(Kazakhstan) Konysbayev (SHA)
2012	Shakhter	Irtysh	Aktobe	(Uzbekistan) Bakaev (IRT) – 14	(Uzbekistan) Bakaev (IRT)
2013	Aktobe	Astana	Kairat	(Belarus) Zenkovich (SHA) – 15	(Kazakhstan) Finonchenko (SHA)
2014	Astana	Aktobe	Kairat	(Central African Republic) Foxi (AST) – 16	(Kazakhstan) Islamkhan (KRT)
2015	Astana	Kairat	Aktobe	(Rwanda) Gohou (KRT) – 22	(Rwanda) Gohou (KRT)
2016	Astana	Kairat	Irtysh	(Rwanda) Gohou (KRT) – 22	(Kazakhstan) Islamkhan (KRT)
2017	Astana	Kairat	Orbadasy	(Rwanda) Gohou (KRT) – 24	(Rwanda) Gohou (KRT)
2018	Astana	Kairat	Tobol	(Armenia) Pizzelli (AKT) – 18	(Armenia) Pizzelli (AKT)
2019	Astana	Kairat	Orbadasy	(Croatia) Tomasov (AST) / (Ukraine) Eseola (KRT) – 19	
2020	Kairat	Tobol	Astana	(Brazil) João Paulo (ORD) – 12	
2021	Tobol	Astana	Kairat	(Croatia) Tomasov (AST) – 17	
2022	Astana	Aktobe	Tobol	(Portugal) Eugénio (AST) – 22	
2023	Ordabasy	Astana	Aktobe	(Brazil) João Paulo (KRT) – 17	
2024	Kairat	Astana	Aktobe	(Brazil) João Paulo (KRT) / (Kazakhstan) Chesnokov (TOB) / (Belarus) Signevich (ATY) – 10	
2025	Kairat	Astana	Tobol	(Albania) Nazmi Gripshi (AST) – 16	
2026					

Notes:

- Historical names shown in brackets according to the season.
- Best Player Award by FFK (1992–2005, 2008, 2010–) and GOAL Journal (2006–2007, 2009).

== List of champions ==
Club	Winners	Runners-up	Third place	Winning years
**Astana**	7	6	1	2014, 2015, 2016, 2017, 2018, 2019, 2022
**Kairat**	5	5	6	1992, 2004, 2020, 2024, 2025
Irtysh	5	4	6	1993, 1997, 1999, 2002, 2003
**Aktobe**	5	4	5	2005, 2007, 2008, 2009, 2013
**Yelimay**	3	–	1	1994, 1995, 1998
**Jenis**	3	–	1	2000, 2001, 2006
**Tobol**	2	5	6	2010, 2021
Shakhter	2	–	3	2011, 2012
**Ordabasy**	2	_	3	2023, 2026
Taraz	1	2	_	1996
**Kyzylzhar**	–	2	1	
**Atyrau**	–	2	–	
Ekibastuzets	–	2	–	
Tomiris	–	1	–	
**Jetisu**	–	1	–	
Gornyak	–	–	1	
Zhiger	–	–	1	
Total	34	34	34	

Notes

- Teams in **bold** currently compete in Premier League.
- Italics identifies either defunct or teams that lost professional status.

== Performance by clubs ==
As of end of the 2025 season.

#	Club	92	93	94	95	96	97	98	99	00	01	02	03	04	05	06	07	08	09	10	11	12	13	14	15	16	17	18	19	20	21	22	23	24	25	1st	2nd	3rd	Cup	SC	FD	Total
1	Kairat	1	11	11	9	6	3		3	4	5	7	7	1	3	7	13	10		10	11	10	3	3	2	2	2	2	2	1	3	4	4	1	1	5	5	6	9	1	1	27
2	Aktobe	12	9	4	14	10	11				8	5	5	4	1	2	1	1	1	2	3	3	1	2	3	6	9	7	12		7	2	3	3	5	5	5	4	2	3	1	20
3	Astana																		2	4	4	5	2	1	1	1	1	1	1	3	2	1	2	2	2	7	6	1	3	3		20
4	Irtysh	3	1	2	7	2	1	3	1	3	4	1	1	2	5	6	4	3	9	3	5	2	6	10	6	3	4	10	8	12						5	4	6	1			17
5	Tobol	13	8	10	12	11			8	7	6	3	2	3	2	3	2	2	4	1	7	6	7	7	7	7	5	3	4	2	1	3	8	5	3	2	5	5	3	4		19
6	Ordabasy	2	4	3	4	14	10	11	6	13	16		6	14	6	13	9	12	7	8	6	7	5	4	4	4	3	4	3	5	5	5	1	4	7	1	1	3	2	1	2	10
7	Shakhter	7	6	6	3	8	4	9	10	5	12	6	10	9	4	4	3	7	3	6	1	1	4	6	10	9	7	8	9	4	6	7	10	13		2		3	1	1		7
8	Zhenis	9	12	14	10	13	9	6	4	1	1	4	3	10	8	1	8	11																10	6	3		1	3			7
9	Kaisar	10	21			7	8	4	5	6	11	10	13	16		15	10	4	13		8	9		5	12		6	5	6	7	13		6	8	11				2		4	6
10	Elimai	14	17	1	1	3	7	1	9	8	7	8	9	19										12										6	4	3		1	1		1	6
11	Okzhetpes	20				18	11	8	16	10	10	12	17	11	9	11	15	9	11	12		14			8	5	12		7	11			12		8						5	5
12	Taraz	5	14	8	2	1	2	10	14	11	15		12	7	11	10	16		8	9	9	4	10	11	9	11	11		10	8	10	12				1	2		1			4
13	Kyzylzhar	19							2	2	3	9	11	6	7	12	11	13	14									11		9	4	10	5	9	9		2	1			1	4
14	Atyrau										2	2	4	5	10	14	14	15	6	5	10	11	8	9	5	8	8	9	11		11	11	7	7	13		2		1			3
15	Ekibastuzets	4	2	9	11	5	6	2	11	16	13		15	8	12	8	12																				2				1	3
16	Zhetysu	21	25		6	9			15	13	14		8	13	15		5	6	5	7	2	12	9	8	11	12		6	5	6	14		11	11	12		1				2	3
17	~~Vostok~~	11	10	12	8	12	5	5	7	11	9	11	14	12	14	9	7	16	10		12		11																1		1	2
18	~~Gornyak~~	8	3	13	5																																	1				1
19	Akzhayik	16	16	16				14					16	17						11		8	12				10	12			9	14									1	1
20	Caspiy	15	20		16	4					17																			10	8	9	13								1	1
21	Aksu																															6	14								1	1
22	Turan																														12	13		12	14							0
23	Maktaaral																															8	9									0
24	Ulytau		22			15	14																												10							0

== League participation ==
Note: The tallies below include up to the 2025 season. Teams denoted in bold are current participants.

- **33** seasons: Shakhter
- **32** seasons: **Kairat**, **Tobol**
- **30** seasons: **Aktobe**
- **28** seasons: Irtysh, Taraz
- **27** seasons: **Kaisar**, **Jetisu**
- **26** seasons: **Ordabasy**
- **24** seasons: **Atyrau**, **Okzhetpes**
- **20** seasons: Vostok
- **19** seasons: **Kyzylzhar**, **Jenis**
- **17** seasons: **Astana**
- **14** seasons: Akzhayik, Ekibastuzets, Spartak
- **9** seasons: Caspiy, Zhiger
- **8** seasons: Shakhter-Bulat
- **5** seasons: Alma-Ata, Tomiris
- **4** seasons: CSKA Almaty, Gornyak, **Turan**, Turkestan, **Ulytau**
- **2** seasons: Aksu, Azhar, Ekibastuz, **Elimai**, Maktaaral
- **1** season: Arman, BGS, Dinamo Alma-Ata, Dostyk, Kazakhmys, Megasport, Namys Almaty, Nasha Kampaniya, Sunkar

=== Soviet Top League participation ===
- **24** seasons: Kairat

== All time top scorers ==
As of 24 September 2026

Rank	Player	Goals
1	(Kazakhstan) Nurbol Zhumaskaliyev	167
2	(Kazakhstan) Murat Tleshev	148
3	(Kazakhstan) Oleg Litvinenko	147
4	(Kazakhstan) Nurken Mazbayev	142
5	(Kazakhstan) Andrey Miroshnichenko	115
6	(Uzbekistan) Ulugbek Bakaev	111
7	(Croatia) Marin Tomasov	105
8	(Kazakhstan) Andrey Finonchenko	103
9	(Kazakhstan) Alibek Buleshev	100
10–11	(Kazakhstan) Alexander Shatskikh	96
10–11	(Kazakhstan) Ruslan Imankulov	96
12	(Kazakhstan) Kairat Aubakirov	94

== See also ==
- Football in Kazakhstan
- Sports league attendances
