= Nikolay Kurganskiy =

Kazakhstani footballer

Personal information
- Full name: Nikolay Alekseevich Kurganskiy
- Date of birth: 19 March 1961 (age 65)
- Place of birth: Ekibastuz, Kazakh SSR
- Position: Striker

Senior career*
Years	Team	Apps	(Gls)
1984–2000	FC Ekibastuzets	408	(159)
1995–1996	→ KePS Kemi (loan)	40	(18)

International career
1992–1994	Kazakhstan	7	(2)
- * Club domestic league appearances and goals

Nikolay Alekseevich Kurganskiy (born 19 March 1961 in Ekibastuz) is a former Kazakh professional football player. He played for FC Ekibastuzets in the Soviet Second League and Kazakhstan Premier League, appearing in over 400 league matches, scoring more than 150 goals.

Kurganskiy made seven appearances for the Kazakhstan national football team, scoring twice.

== Awards ==
- 1993 Kazakhstan FF "Best Player of the year"
- Kazakhstan Second Top scorer: 1992, 1993

== Career statistics ==
=== International goals ===
Scores and results list. Kazakhstan's goal tally first.

#	Date	Venue	Opponent	Score	Result	Competition
1.	25 October 1992	Gany Muratbayev Stadium, Kyzylorda, Kazakhstan	Kyrgyzstan	1–0	2–0	Friendly
2.	25 October 1992	Gany Muratbayev Stadium, Kyzylorda, Kazakhstan	Kyrgyzstan	2–0	2–0	Friendly
Correct as of 13 January 2017
