= 1992 Kazakhstan Premier League =

Kazakhstan Top Division
- Season: 1992
- Champions: Kairat
- Relegated: Metallist; Arman; CSKA
- Top goalscorer: Sergei Kogai (21)

The 1992 Kazakhstan Top Division was the inaugural season of the Top Division, now called the Kazakhstan Premier League, the highest football league competition in Kazakhstan.

== League format ==
Originally planned 25 teams in total. But withdrawal of Metallurg after couple of games and which results were annulled cut Group A one team fewer.

It was split into two stages. In first stage two groups of 11 and 13 teams were formed. In second stage the best seven teams of each group joined together to play in a final group for positions 1 to 14. The rest of the teams played in a group for positions 15 to 24. Teams played against each other on home-away basis in their groups. Final standings of teams did not count the results of the first stage.

=== Teams in the 1991 Soviet football season ===
1991 Soviet First League

- «Kairat» (Alma-Ata) - 14th place

1991 Soviet Second League

- «Vostok» (Ust-Kamenogorsk) - 5th place
- «Tselinnik» (Akmola) - 8th place
- «Traktor» (Pavlodar) - 9th place
- «Shakhter» (Karaganda) - 10th place
- «Fosfor» (Dzhambul) - 11th place
- «Zhiger» (Chimkent) - 12th place
- «Ekibastuzets» (Ekibastuz) - 18th place
- «Zhetysu» (Taldy-Kurgan) - 21st place

1991 Soviet Second League B (republican competition)

- «Aktyubinets» (Aktiubinsk) - 1st place
- «Spartak» (Semipalatinsk) - 2nd place
- «Khimik» (Kustanai) - 3rd place
- «Kaisar» (Kyzyl-Orda) - 4th place
- «Metallurg» (Dzhezkazgan) - 5th place
- «Gornyak» (Khromtau) - 6th place
- «Metallist» (Petropavlovsk) - 8th place
- «Bolat» (Temirtau) - 9th place
- «Kokshetau» (Kokchetav) - 11th place
- «Montazhnik» (Turkestan) - 12th place
- «Arman» (Kentau) - 13th place
- «Aktau» (Aktau) - 15th place
- «Uralets» (Uralsk) - 17th place

Teams without the Soviet status of "teams of masters" (professional teams)

- «Arsenal-SKIF» (Chimkent)
- «Zenit» (Kokchetav)
- CSKA (Alma-Ata)

=== Group A ===
Locations of teams in the 1992 Kazakhstan Premier League

Team	Location	Venue	Capacity
Aktau	Aktau	Zhastar Stadium	
Arman	Kentau		
Aktyubinets	Aktobe	Central Stadium	
Fosfor	Taraz	Central Stadium	
Gornyak	Khromtau		
Kairat	Almaty	Central Stadium	
Khimik	Kostanay	Central Stadium	
Kokshetau	Kokshetau	Okzhetpes Stadium	
Metallurg	Dzhezkazgan		
Tselinnik	Astana	Kazhymukan Munaitpasov Stadium	
Uralets	Oral	Petr Atoyan Stadium	
Zhiger	Shymkent	Kazhymukan Munaitpasov Stadium	

=== Group B ===
Team	Location	Venue	Capacity
Arsenal-SKIF			
Batyr			
Bolat			
CSKA	Almaty		
Kaisar			
Metallist			
Montazhnik			
Shakhter	Karagandy		
Spartak	Semey		
Traktor	Pavlodar		
Vostok			
Zenit	Kokshetau		
Zhetysu			

== First round ==
=== Group A ===
==== League table ====
Pos	Team	Pld	W	D	L	GF	GA	GD	Pts	Qualification
1	Kairat	20	16	2	2	49	10	+39	50	Qualification for the championship round
2	Fosfor	20	12	3	5	36	19	+17	39	Qualification for the championship round
3	Tselinnik Tselinograd	20	10	4	6	35	26	+9	34	Qualification for the championship round
4	Zhiger	20	9	6	5	35	21	+14	33	Qualification for the championship round
5	Gornyak	20	10	3	7	24	22	+2	33	Qualification for the championship round
6	Khimik	20	9	2	9	30	26	+4	29	Qualification for the championship round
7	Aktyubinets	20	7	6	7	22	19	+3	27	Qualification for the championship round
8	Aktau	20	8	2	10	27	33	−6	26	Qualification for the relegation round
9	Uralets	20	5	3	12	15	39	−24	18	Qualification for the relegation round
10	Kokshetau	20	5	1	14	15	39	−24	16	Qualification for the relegation round
11	Arman	20	3	0	17	24	58	−34	9	Qualification for the relegation round

Source: kpfl.kz
Rules for classification: 1) points; 2) goal difference; 3) number of goals scored.

==== Results ====
Home \ Away	AKT	ATA	ARM	FOS	GOR	KHI	KOK	KRT	TSE	URA	ZHI
Aktyubinets		2–0	0–2	0–5	0–1	1–0	0–1	1–1	0–0	8–0	0–2
Aktau	1–1		3–0	2–1	2–0	0–4	1–0	0–4	3–1	3–0	0–3
Arman	0–2	4–7		1–2	2–3	2–3	4–1	1–8	0–2	0–1	2–8
Fosfor	0–0	3–1	2–0		0–0	2–1	2–1	0–2	0–2	3–0	1–4
Gornyak	1–0	4–2	2–0	0–3		0–1	2–1	0–2	1–2	1–0	0–0
Khimik	1–1	0–1	3–0	3–2	1–2		2–0	0–3	2–2	1–2	2–1
Kokshetau	1–3	1–0	2–1	0–1	0–3	3–1		0–4	1–2	3–2	0–3
Kairat	3–1	1–0	3–0	0–2	2–0	2–1	2–0		5–1	1–0	1–1
Tselinnik Tselinograd	0–1	2–0	3–2	0–2	0–2	1–2	3–0	2–1		6–0	3–1
Uralets	0–1	1–0	2–0	1–1	1–1	0–2	3–0	0–2	2–2		0–3
Zhiger	0–0	1–1	1–3	1–4	3–1	1–0	0–0	0–2	1–1	1–0	

Legend: Blue = home team win; Yellow = draw; Red = away team win.

=== Group B ===
==== League table ====
Pos	Team	Pld	W	D	L	GF	GA	GD	Pts	Qualification
1	Batyr	24	16	2	6	35	17	+18	50	Qualification for the championship round
2	Shakhter Karagandy	24	13	8	3	46	17	+29	47	Qualification for the championship round
3	Traktor	24	14	5	5	47	26	+21	47	Qualification for the championship round
4	Kaisar	24	14	1	9	33	20	+13	43	Qualification for the championship round
5	Arsenal-SKIF	24	12	5	7	38	21	+17	41	Qualification for the championship round
6	Vostok	24	13	1	10	39	26	+13	40	Qualification for the championship round
7	Spartak	24	12	3	9	42	41	+1	39	Qualification for the championship round
8	Bolat	24	9	7	8	32	23	+9	34	Qualification for the relegation round
9	Metallist	24	9	6	9	41	41	0	33	Qualification for the relegation round
10	Montazhnik	24	6	7	11	32	39	−7	25	Qualification for the relegation round
11	Zhetysu	24	5	6	13	31	35	−4	21	Qualification for the relegation round
12	Zenit Kokshetau	24	4	1	19	14	60	−46	13	Qualification for the relegation round
13	CSKA	23	3	0	20	27	91	−64	9	Qualification for the relegation round

Source: kpfl.kz
Rules for classification: 1) points; 2) goal difference; 3) number of goals scored.

==== Results ====
Home \ Away	ARS	BAT	BOL	CSK	KSR	MPE	MON	SPA	SHA	TRA	VOS	ZEN	ZHE
Arsenal-SKIF		3–2	0–0	2–3	1–4	1–2	1–0	3–0	0–0	2–0	3–1	0–1	0–0
Batyr	0–1		2–1	1–0	2–0	0–1	1–0	2–1	1–0	1–1	1–0	1–0	3–0
Bolat	1–1	2–1		5–0	0–3	1–2	0–0	0–1	0–2	2–1	0–2	2–1	0–0
CSKA	0–7	1–2	0–8		2–0	0–6	1–2	0–3	2–9	3–6	0–1	1–2	1–7
Kaisar	0–2	0–1	0–0	4–1		4–0	3–0	0–2	1–0	0–1	2–1	2–1	3–2
Metallist	0–4	0–1	1–1	4–1	3–1 (Note: The result of the match between Metallist and Kaisar (3–1) was declared invalid and declared as a regulation win for Kaisar, but no goals.)		2–2	1–1	1–4	2–6	1–0	3–0	0–1
Montazhnik	1–2	0–2	3–0	3–1	0–1	3–2		3–5	0–0	1–4	4–2	4–1	0–0
Spartak	1–0	1–1	0–2	6–3	0–1	3–3	2–0		1–4	3–1	3–2	2–0	2–1
Shakhter Karagandy	2–1	1–2	0–0	2–0	1–0	1–1	1–1	3–0		0–0	2–0	7–1	0–0
Traktor	2–1	1–0	2–1	5–3	0–2	0–0	4–2	2–0	1–1		2–0	4–0	1–0
Vostok	0–0	3–0	1–2	4–0	1–0	4–1	1–0	5–2	0–1	2–0		4–2	2–0
Zenit Kokshetau	XXX (Note: The match between Zenit Kokshetau and Arsenal-SKIF was apparently never played, but the football association decided to win a regulation victory for Arsenal-SKIF declared, but without goals.)	0–4	0–2	0–4	2–0	0–6	0–0	2–0	1–2	0–3	2–1 (Note: The result of the match between Zenit Kokshetau and Vostok (2–1) was declared invalid and led to a regulation win for Vostok declared, but without goals.)		2–1
Zhetysu	1–3	0–1	0–2	2–0	2–1	1–2	3–3	2–3	2–3	0–0	0–3	6–0	

Legend: Blue = home team win; Yellow = draw; Red = away team win.

== Second round ==
=== Championship round ===
==== League table ====
Pos	Team	Pld	W	D	L	GF	GA	GD	Pts
1	Kairat (C)	26	16	5	5	48	22	+26	53
2	Arsenal-SKIF	26	14	8	4	39	21	+18	50
3	Traktor	26	14	8	4	39	22	+17	50
4	Batyr	26	14	6	6	39	24	+15	48
5	Fosfor	26	12	5	9	40	29	+11	41
6	Zhiger	26	9	10	7	33	32	+1	37
7	Shakhter Karagandy	26	8	12	6	24	22	+2	36
8	Gornyak	26	8	7	11	24	29	−5	31
9	Tselinnik Tselinograd	26	7	9	10	32	37	−5	30
10	Kaisar	26	9	2	15	25	29	−4	29
11	Vostok	26	8	4	14	29	35	−6	28
12	Aktyubinets	26	4	12	10	12	31	−19	24
13	Khimik	26	7	3	16	29	45	−16	24
14	Spartak	26	5	3	18	25	60	−35	18

Source: kpfl.kz
Rules for classification: 1) points; 2) goal difference; 3) number of goals scored.
(C) Champions

==== Results ====
Home \ Away	AKT	ARS	BAT	FOS	GOR	KHI	KRT	KSR	SPA	SHA	TRA	TSE	VOS	ZHI
Aktyubinets		0–2	0–1					0–0	0–0	1–1	0–6		1–3	
Arsenal-SKIF	2–0			2–2	0–0	2–1	1–1					1–1		0–0
Batyr	0–1			2–3	1–1	2–1	1–1					4–0		0–0
Fosfor		1–2	0–2					1–0	2–0	0–0	0–1		2–0	
Gornyak		0–1	0–2					0–2	1–0	0–0	0–2		4–0	
Khimik		1–3	1–2					0–2	4–2	1–1	1–2		1–0	
Kairat		1–2	1–2					1–0	5–1	2–0	0–0		1–0	
Kaisar	1–1			0–2	2–3	0–1	0–1					3–0		2–3
Spartak	1–1			2–4	0–3	4–2	0–1					0–2		1–2
Shakhter Karagandy	0–0			2–2	2–1	1–2 (Note: The result of the match between Shakhter Karagandy and Khimik (1–2) was declared invalid and declared as a regulation win for Shakhter Karagandy, but no goals.)	1–3					0–0		0–2
Traktor	0–0			2–0	2–2	3–0	4–3					1–0		2–2
Tselinnik Tselinograd		0–3	2–2					3–0	6–0	1–1	1–1		2–2	
Vostok	0–1			1–0	1–1	4–1	1–3					1–0		0–1
Zhiger		1–1	0–4					1–3	3–0	1–1	1–2		1–1	

Legend: Blue = home team win; Yellow = draw; Red = away team win.

=== Relegation round ===
==== League table ====
Pos	Team	Pld	W	D	L	GF	GA	GD	Pts	Relegation
15	Aktau	18	13	1	4	48	19	+29	40	
16	Uralets	18	13	0	5	42	17	+25	39	
17	Bolat	18	10	4	4	37	12	+25	34	
18	Montazhnik	18	9	5	4	32	23	+9	32	
19	Metallist (R)	18	9	2	7	43	26	+17	29	Relegation to the Kazakhstan First Division
20	Kokshetau	18	9	1	8	30	28	+2	28	
21	Zhetysu	18	8	3	7	32	20	+12	27	
22	Arman (R)	18	6	0	12	35	41	−6	18	Relegation to the Kazakhstan First Division
23	Zenit Kokshetau	18	2	2	14	12	61	−49	8	
24	CSKA (R)	18	2	0	16	15	79	−64	6	Relegation to the Kazakhstan First Division

Source: kpfl.kz
Rules for classification: 1) points; 2) goal difference; 3) number of goals scored.
(R) Relegated

==== Results ====
Home \ Away	ATA	ARM	BOL	CSK	KOK	MPE	MON	URA	ZEN	ZHE
Aktau			2–2	5–0		2–1	2–3		2–0	2–0
Arman			0–2	1–3		XXX (Note: The match between Arman and Metallist (unk.) was declared as a regulation victory for Arman, but with no goals.)	0–1		5–2	0–1
Bolat	5–0	2–0			4–1			1–0		
CSKA	0–7	2–6			0–4			0–8		
Kokshetau			1–0	5–0		1–2	1–0		2–2	1–3
Metallist	0–5	7–2			4–2			1–2		
Montazhnik	2–3	1–2			2–1			0–2		
Uralets			1–0	4–1		2–0	2–3		3–1	2–4
Zenit Kokshetau	0–4	1–8			0–1			0–7		
Zhetysu	XXX (Note: The match between Zhetysu and Aktau (unk.) was declared as a regulation win for Aktau, but no goals were scored.)	3–2			0–3			XXX (Note: The match between Zhetysu and Uralets (unk.) was declared as a regulation victory for Uralets, but no goals were scored.)		

Legend: Blue = home team win; Yellow = draw; Red = away team win.

== Statistics ==
=== Top scorers ===
Rank	Player	Club	Goals
1	(Kazakhstan) Sergei Kogai	Kaisar	22
2	(Kazakhstan) Eduard Glazunov	Aktau	20
3	(Kazakhstan) Pavel Demyan	Bulat	19
3	(Kazakhstan) Igor Grokhovskiy	Arman	19
3	(Kazakhstan) Radik Baiburin	Metallist	19
3	(Kazakhstan) Nikolay Kurganskiy	Ekisbastuzets	19
7	(Kazakhstan) Evgeniy Sorokin	Gornyak	18
7	(Kazakhstan) Sergei Kondratskiy	Metallist	18
9	(Kazakhstan) Oleg Rylov	Traktor	16
9	(Kazakhstan) Ruslan Duzmambetov	Vostok	16

== See also ==
- Kazakhstan national football team 1992
