= Arsen Tlekhugov =

Kazakhstani footballer

Personal information
- Full name: Arsen Vyacheslavovich Tlekhugov
- Date of birth: 3 November 1976 (age 49)
- Place of birth: Urukh, Leskensky District, Russian SFSR
- Height: 1.82 m (6 ft 0 in)
- Position: Forward

Senior career*
Years	Team	Apps	(Gls)
1994	FC Avtozapchast Baksan	1	(0)
1996–1997	PFC Spartak Nalchik	4	(1)
1996–1997	→ PFC Spartak-2 Nalchik (loans)	49	(7)
1998	FC Nart Nartkala	15	(6)
1998–1999	PFC Spartak Nalchik	37	(9)
1999	FC Nart Nartkala	18	(11)
2000	FC Lokomotiv Nizhny Novgorod	12	(1)
2000	FC Kristall Smolensk	8	(1)
2001–2002	FC Zhenis	52	(37)
2003	FC Esil Kokshetau	6	(2)
2003–2006	FC Kairat	66	(34)
2006	FC Megafon-Kavkaz Nalchik		
2006	FC Zheleznodorozhnik Almaty		
2007	FC Astana	6	(0)
2008	Buxoro FK	10	(2)

International career
2004	Kazakhstan	1	(0)
- * Club domestic league appearances and goals

Arsen Tlekhugov (Russian: Арсен Вячеславович Тлехугов; born 3 November 1976 in Urukh, Leskensky District) is a former Kazakhstani football forward who was born in Russia. He capped once for National team and was top scorer of Kazakhstan Super League twice. Tlekhugov played for clubs including Astana FK and Qayrat Almati.

== Awards ==
- 2001 Kazakhstan FF and Goal Journal "Best Player of the year"
- Kazakhstan Top Scorer: 2001, 2004

== Honours ==
- Kazakhstan League Champion: 2004
- Kazakhstan Cup Winner: 2002, 2003
