= 1995 Kazakhstan Premier League =

Kazakhstan Top Division
- Season: 1995
- Champions: Yelimay
- Asian Club Championship: Yelimay
- Asian Cup Winners' Cup: SKIF-Ordabasy
- Matches played: 240
- Goals scored: 619 (2.58 per match)
- Top goalscorer: Andrei Miroshnichenko (23)

The 1995 Kazakhstan Top Division was the fourth season of the Top Division, now called the Kazakhstan Premier League, the highest football league competition in Kazakhstan.

== Teams ==
The relegated teams at the end of the 1994 season were Uralets-Arma and Yassi, whilst Munaishy and Kainar were promoted in their place. Prior to the start of the season Khimik was renamed FC Tobol.

=== Team overview ===
Locations of teams in the 1995 Kazakhstan Premier League

Team	Location	Venue	Capacity
Aktyubinets	Aktobe	Central Stadium	
Ansat	Pavlodar	Central Stadium	
Batyr	Ekibastuz	Shakhtyor Stadium	
Bolat	Temirtau	Metallurg Stadium	
Gornyak	Khromtau		
Kainar	Taldykorgan	Zhetysu Stadium	
Kairat	Almaty	Central Stadium	
Munaishy	Aktau	Zhastar Stadium	
Shakhter Karagandy	Karaganda	Shakhter Stadium	
SKIF-Ordabasy	Shymkent	Kazhymukan Munaitpasov Stadium	
Taraz	Taraz	Central Stadium	
Tobol	Kostanay	Central Stadium	
Tsesna Akmola	Astana	Kazhymukan Munaitpasov Stadium	
Vostok	Oskemen	Vostok Stadium	
Yelimay	Semey	Spartak Stadium	
Zhiger	Shymkent	Kazhymukan Munaitpasov Stadium	

== League table ==
Pos	Team	Pld	W	D	L	GF	GA	GD	Pts	Qualification
1	Yelimay (C)	30	21	4	5	68	23	+45	67	Qualification for the Asian Club Championship
2	Taraz	30	20	2	8	61	34	+27	62	
3	Shakhter Karagandy	30	18	6	6	43	24	+19	60	
4	Zhiger	30	16	4	10	59	34	+25	52	
5	Gornyak	30	14	8	8	49	27	+22	50	
6	Kainar	30	13	6	11	33	32	+1	45	
7	Ansat	30	12	9	9	38	28	+10	45	
8	Vostok	30	13	3	14	40	41	−1	42	
9	Kairat	30	13	2	15	37	35	+2	41	
10	Tsesna Akmola	30	11	6	13	36	42	−6	39	
11	Batyr	30	10	7	13	22	32	−10	37	
12	Tobol	30	10	6	14	30	37	−7	36	
13	SKIF-Ordabasy	30	8	8	14	28	33	−5	32	Qualification for the Asian Cup Winners' Cup
14	Aktyubinets	30	9	5	16	26	45	−19	32	
15	Bolat	30	8	5	17	34	45	−11	29	
16	Munaishy	30	1	5	24	15	107	−92	8	

Source: kpfl.kz
Rules for classification: 1) points; 2) goal difference; 3) number of goals scored.
(C) Champions

== Results ==
Home \ Away	AKT	ANS	BAT	BOL	GOR	KNR	KRT	MUN	SHA	SKI	TAR	TOB	TSE	VOS	YEL	ZHI
Aktyubinets		– (Note: Match result declared invalid; official home win, without goals.)	3–2	1–0	1–3	1–0	0–1	3–0	0–0	0–0	3–1	1–0	1–0	0–3	1–2	1–2
Ansat	2–2		0–0	3–0	0–0	2–0	2–1	4–0	4–1	2–0	1–0	0–0	3–1	2–2	1–1	–
Batyr	0–0	2–2		1–0	1–1	2–0	1–0	1–0	0–2	4–1	1–1	2–0	1–1	1–0	1–0	–
Bolat	2–1	0–1	2–1		2–0	2–1	1–0	10–1	0–1	1–0	2–2	2–2	0–0	1–0	0–1	2–2
Gornyak	4–1	2–0	3–0	3–2		1–1	2–0	6–0	0–0	0–0	3–1	2–0	3–0	3–0	1–2	5–0
Kainar	1–0	2–0	0–0	2–0	1–1		0–1	3–1	2–1	2–0	3–0	2–0	1–0	1–0	2–1	3–1
Kairat	2–0	0–0	1–0	4–1	0–1	1–0		3–0	4–1	1–0	2–4	3–0	2–0	2–1	3–4	0–1
Munaishy	1–4	0–2	0–1	3–2	0–3	0–0	1–2		1–1	1–1	1–2	0–0	1–2	1–2	0–0	1–2
Shakhter Karagandy	2–0	2–0	3–0	1–0	1–0	2–1	3–1	5–0		1–0	2–0	3–1	2–1	2–0	1–1	3–0
SKIF-Ordabasy	3–0	1–2	3–0	2–1	2–0	0–0	3–2	4–1	1–1		0–1	1–0	2–0	1–3	1–1	1–1
Taraz	4–0	2–1	1–0	2–1	1–0	6–0	2–0	9–0	1–0	2–0		3–0	2–0	3–0	1–0	3–0
Tobol	1–0	2–1	1–0	2–0	2–0	1–3	0–0	5–0	0–1	0–0	2–0		1–0	2–0	3–2	1–1
Tsesna Akmola	0–0	3–2	1–0	0–0	2–2	2–0	1–0	4–0	0–0	3–0	5–1	3–2		2–1	1–2	2–1
Vostok	4–1	1–1	1–0	2–0	3–0	0–0	2–0	4–0	0–1	–	2–3	2–1	3–1		2–0	0–2
Yelimay	3–0	1–0	4–0	3–0	4–0	5–2	1–0	10–0	3–0	–	3–0	4–1	2–0	5–1		2–1
Zhiger	2–1	2–0	1–0	3–0	0–0	1–0	3–1	12–1	3–0	3–1	2–3	1–0	7–1	5–1	0–1	

Legend: Blue = home team win; Yellow = draw; Red = away team win.

== Statistics ==
=== Top scorers ===
Rank	Player	Club	Goals
1	(Kazakhstan) Andrei Miroshnichenko	Yelimay	23
2	(Kazakhstan) Nurken Mazbaev	Batyr	19
2	(Kazakhstan) Vladimir Korolev	Gornyak	19
4	(Kazakhstan) Vladimir Kravchenko	Bulat	17
5	(Kazakhstan) Ruslan Duzmambetov	Vostok	14
6	(Kazakhstan) Andrei Vaganov	Zhiger	13

== See also ==
- Kazakhstan national football team 1995
