= 1991 Soviet Second League =

Second League
- Season: 1991
- Champions: Karpaty Lviv, Asmaral Moscow, Okean Nakhodka
- Promoted: Karpaty Lviv, Asmaral Moscow, Okean Nakhodka
- Relegated: 12 teams (cancelled)

1991 Soviet Second League was the last edition of the Soviet Second League competition. There were three groups (known as zones) with 66 teams in total (22 in each group). Competitions in the last year "Baltic League" were not held as the Soviet Union was crumbling down.

Next seasons all of the clubs competed in their own national championships and most of them at the top level.

== Teams ==
=== Locations ===
Location of teams in the 1991 Soviet Second League.

== Final standings ==
=== Zone West ===
Pos	Republic (Note: Numerous clubs refused to play away games in Azerbaijan due to the First Nagorno-Karabakh War (Operation Ring).)	Team	Pld	W	D	L	GF	GA	GD	Pts
1	(Ukrainian Soviet Socialist Republic) Ukraine	Karpaty Lviv	42	24	11	7	47	27	+20	59
2	(Ukrainian Soviet Socialist Republic) Ukraine	Zorya Luhansk (Note: Teams that refused to play against Goyazan Kazakh only: Zarya Luhansk and Niva Vinnitsa.)	42	26	5	11	69	34	+35	57
3	(Azerbaijan Soviet Socialist Republic) Azerbaijan	Dinamo Gandzha	42	26	4	12	48	48	0	56 (Note: All Azerbaijani clubs received multiple technical wins such: Dinamo Gandzha: 10 technical wins; +20 points; Karabakh Agdam: 11 technical wins; +22 points; Goyazan Kazakh: 4 technical wins; +8 points)
4	(Ukrainian Soviet Socialist Republic) Ukraine	Nyva Ternopil (Note: Teams that refused to play against Dinamo Gandzha and Karabakh Agdam: Nyva Ternopil, Volyn Lutsk, Tigina-Apoel Bendery, SKA Odesa, Dnepr Mogilev, Kremen Kremenchug, Sudnostroitel Nikolayev, Dinamo Brest, KIM Vitebsk, and Khimik Grodno.)	42	25	6	11	56	29	+27	56
5	(Ukrainian Soviet Socialist Republic) Ukraine	Nyva Vinnytsia	42	21	7	14	54	40	+14	49
6	(Russian Soviet Federative Socialist Republic) Russia (1W)	Torpedo Taganrog	42	19	9	14	46	30	+16	47
7	(Ukrainian Soviet Socialist Republic) Ukraine	Torpedo Zaporizhzhia	42	18	10	14	63	50	+13	46
8	(Ukrainian Soviet Socialist Republic) Ukraine	Volyn Lutsk	42	19	7	16	46	33	+13	45
9	(Moldavian Soviet Socialist Republic) Moldova	Tigina-Apoel Bendery	42	18	8	16	49	39	+10	44
10	(Ukrainian Soviet Socialist Republic) Ukraine	SKA Odesa	42	18	7	17	46	42	+4	43
11	(Azerbaijan Soviet Socialist Republic) Azerbaijan	Karabakh Agdam	42	20	2	20	20	47	−27	42
12	(Byelorussian Soviet Socialist Republic) Belarus	Dnepr Mogilev (Note: Teams that refused to play against all Azerbaijani clubs: Dnepr Mogilev and KIM Vitebsk.)	42	18	6	18	47	37	+10	42
13	(Ukrainian Soviet Socialist Republic) Ukraine	Kremin Kremenchuk	42	16	9	17	56	50	+6	41
14	(Moldavian Soviet Socialist Republic) Moldova	Zaria Beltsy	42	16	7	19	63	82	−19	39
15	(Ukrainian Soviet Socialist Republic) Ukraine	Sudnobudivnyk Mykolaiv	42	15	8	19	61	55	+6	38
16	(Byelorussian Soviet Socialist Republic) Belarus	Dinamo Brest	42	14	9	19	50	50	0	37
17	(Russian Soviet Federative Socialist Republic) Russia (1W)	Spartak Nalchik	42	15	6	21	51	67	−16	36
18	(Ukrainian Soviet Socialist Republic) Ukraine(1)	Halychyna Drohobych	42	14	7	21	42	66	−24	35
19	(Ukrainian Soviet Socialist Republic) Ukraine(1)	Vorskla Poltava	42	10	11	21	39	60	−21	31
20	(Byelorussian Soviet Socialist Republic) Belarus	KIM Vitebsk	42	11	8	23	43	55	−12	30
21	(Azerbaijan Soviet Socialist Republic) Azerbaijan	Goyazan Kazakh	42	13	2	27	29	61	−32	28
22	(Byelorussian Soviet Socialist Republic) Belarus	Khimik Grodno	42	7	9	26	32	55	−23	23

Notes:

Representation

- Ukrainian SSR: 11
- Byelorussian SSR: 4
- Moldavian SSR 2
- Russian SFSR 2
- Azerbaijan SSR 3

=== Center ===
Pos	Republic (Note: Several clubs refused to play away games in Armenia due to the First Nagorno-Karabakh War (Operation Ring). Both Armenian clubs received multiple technical wins such Lori Kirovakan 4 technical wins, Ararat-2 Yerevan - 3.: Teams that refused to play against Armenian clubs: Metallurg Lipetsk, KamAZ Naberezhnye Chelny, and Dinamo Bryansk.)	Team	Pld	W	D	L	GF	GA	GD	Pts
1	(Russian Soviet Federative Socialist Republic) Russia	Asmaral Moscow (C)	42	24	14	4	86	32	+54	62
2	(Russian Soviet Federative Socialist Republic) Russia	KSS	42	26	8	8	83	41	+42	60
3	(Russian Soviet Federative Socialist Republic) Russia (1W)	Torpedo Vladimir	42	26	5	11	79	40	+39	57
4	(Russian Soviet Federative Socialist Republic) Russia (1W)	Metallurg Lipetsk	42	21	7	14	61	47	+14	49
5	(Russian Soviet Federative Socialist Republic) Russia (1W)	Terek Grozny	42	19	11	12	55	40	+15	49
6	(Russian Soviet Federative Socialist Republic) Russia (1C)	Lada Togliatti (Note: Lada Togliatti did not arrive for the away game against Lori Kirovakan.)	42	18	8	16	63	61	+2	44
7	(Russian Soviet Federative Socialist Republic) Russia (1C)	Torpedo Volzhsky	42	17	10	15	55	54	+1	44
8	(Russian Soviet Federative Socialist Republic) Russia (1C)	Sokol Saratov	42	19	4	19	72	74	−2	42
9	(Russian Soviet Federative Socialist Republic) Russia (1C)	Zenit Izhevsk	42	17	8	17	67	45	+22	42
10	(Russian Soviet Federative Socialist Republic) Russia (1C)	KAMAZ	42	19	3	20	60	55	+5	41
11	(Russian Soviet Federative Socialist Republic) Russia (2)	Dynamo Briansk	42	18	5	19	47	50	−3	41
12	(Russian Soviet Federative Socialist Republic) Russia (1C)	Torpedo Riazan	42	17	7	18	51	50	+1	41
13	(Russian Soviet Federative Socialist Republic) Russia (1W)	Cement Novorossiysk	42	16	8	18	70	56	+14	40
14	(Russian Soviet Federative Socialist Republic) Russia (1C)	Zvezda Perm	42	14	12	16	58	53	+5	40
15	(Russian Soviet Federative Socialist Republic) Russia (1W)	Druzhba Maikop	42	15	8	19	58	59	−1	38
16	(Russian Soviet Federative Socialist Republic) Russia (1W)	APK Azov	42	14	9	19	36	52	−16	37
17	(Russian Soviet Federative Socialist Republic) Russia (1W)	Nart Cherkessk	42	13	11	18	45	50	−5	37
18	(Russian Soviet Federative Socialist Republic) Russia (1C)	Gastello Ufa	42	13	8	21	43	69	−26	34
19	(Russian Soviet Federative Socialist Republic) Russia (2)	Start Ulyanovsk	42	12	10	20	36	57	−21	34
20	(Russian Soviet Federative Socialist Republic) Russia (1W)	Volga Tver	42	14	5	23	35	66	−31	33
21	(Armenian Soviet Socialist Republic)	Ararat-2 Yerevan	42	14	2	26	37	80	−43	30
22	(Armenian Soviet Socialist Republic) Armenia	Lori Kirovakan	42	12	5	25	32	98	−66	29

(C) Champions

=== East ===
Pos	Republic	Team	Pld	W	D	L	GF	GA	GD	Pts
1	(Russian Soviet Federative Socialist Republic) Russia	Okean Nakhodka	42	27	7	8	68	33	+35	61
2	(Turkmen Soviet Socialist Republic) Turkmenistan	Kopetdag Ashkhabat	42	25	8	9	89	36	+53	58
3	(Kirghiz Soviet Socialist Republic) Kyrgyzstan	Alga Bishkek (Note: Capital city of the Kyrgyz SSR Frunze was renamed into Bishkek.)	42	21	12	9	60	31	+29	54
4	(Uzbek Soviet Socialist Republic) Uzbekistan	Nurafshon Bukhara	42	20	9	13	72	45	+27	49
5	(Kazakh Soviet Socialist Republic) Kazakhstan	Vostok Ust-Kamenogorsk	42	19	9	14	69	62	+7	47
6	(Russian Soviet Federative Socialist Republic) Russia (1E)	Zvezda Irkutsk	42	20	5	17	62	45	+17	45
7	(Russian Soviet Federative Socialist Republic) Russia (1E)	Kuzbass Kemerevo	42	19	6	17	58	61	−3	44
8	(Kazakh Soviet Socialist Republic) Kazakhstan	Tselinnik Tselinograd	42	19	6	17	44	51	−7	44
9	(Kazakh Soviet Socialist Republic) Kazakhstan	Traktor Pavlodar	42	19	5	18	54	50	+4	43
10	(Kazakh Soviet Socialist Republic) Kazakhstan	Shakhter Karaganda	42	18	7	17	48	42	+6	43
11	(Kazakh Soviet Socialist Republic) Kazakhstan	Khimik Dzhambul	42	17	9	16	56	47	+9	43
12	(Kazakh Soviet Socialist Republic) Kazakhstan	Meliorator Chimkent	42	17	9	16	44	37	+7	43
13	(Russian Soviet Federative Socialist Republic) Russia (1E)	Amur Blagoveschensk	42	16	11	15	51	53	−2	43
14	(Uzbek Soviet Socialist Republic) Uzbekistan	Avtomobilist Kokand	42	19	4	19	67	71	−4	42
15	(Russian Soviet Federative Socialist Republic) Russia (1E)	Dynamo Barnaul	42	15	12	15	60	64	−4	42
16	(Uzbek Soviet Socialist Republic) Uzbekistan	Sogdiana Dzhizak	42	18	5	19	56	55	+1	41
17	(Uzbek Soviet Socialist Republic) Uzbekistan	Kasansayets Kasansai	42	17	6	19	69	66	+3	40
18	(Kazakh Soviet Socialist Republic) Kazakhstan	Ekibastuzets Ekibastuz	42	14	9	19	49	63	−14	37
19	(Russian Soviet Federative Socialist Republic) Russia (1E)	Sakhalin Yuzhno-Sakhalinsk	42	12	10	20	37	59	−22	34
20	(Uzbek Soviet Socialist Republic) Uzbekistan	Surkhan Termez	42	12	3	27	37	65	−28	27
21	(Kazakh Soviet Socialist Republic) Kazakhstan	Zhetysu Taldy‑Kurgan	42	9	6	27	44	96	−52	24
22	(Tajik Soviet Socialist Republic) Tajikistan	Vakhsh Kurgan‑Tyube	42	7	6	29	36	98	−62	20

Notes:

Representation

- Kazakh SSR: 8
- Russian SFSR: 6
- Uzbek SSR: 5
- Kyrgyz SSR: 1
- Turkmen SSR: 1
- Tajik SSR: 1

== Number of teams by union republic ==
Rank	Union republic	Number of teams	Club(s)
1	RSFSR	28	Amur Blagoveschensk, APK Azov, Asmaral Moscow, Dinamo Barnaul, Dinamo Briansk, Druzhba Maikop, Gastello Ufa, KAMAZ Naberezhnye Chelny, Krylya Sovetov Samara, Kuzbass Kemerevo, Lada Togliatti, Metallurg Lipetsk, Nart Cherkessk, Okean Nakhodka, Sakhalin Yuzhno-Sakhalinsk, Sokol Saratov, Spartak Nalchik, Start Ulyanovsk, Terek Grozny, Torpedo Riazan, Torpedo Taganrog, Torpedo Vladimir, Torpedo Volzhsky, Tsement Novorossiysk, Volga Tver, Zenit Izhevsk, Zvezda Irkutsk, Zvezda Perm
2	Ukrainian SSR	11	SKA Odesa, Galichina Drogobich, Karpaty Lvov, Kremin Kremenchuk, Niva Ternopol, Niva Vinnitsa, Sudostroitel Nikolaev, Torpedo Zaporizhzhia, Volyn Lutsk, Vorskla Poltava, Zaria Lugansk
3	Kazakh SSR	8	Ekibastuzets Ekibastuz, Khimik Dzhambul, Meliorator Chimkent, Shakhter Karaganda, Traktor Pavlodar, Tselinnik Tselinograd, Vostok Ust-Kamenogorsk, Zhetysu Taldy-Kurgan
4	Uzbek SSR	5	Avtomobilist Kokand, Kasansaets Kasansai, Nuravshon Bukhara, Sogdiana Dzhizzakh, Surkhan Termez
5	Byelorussian SSR	4	Dinamo Brest, Dnepr Mogilev, Khimik Grodno, KIM Vitebsk
6	Azerbaijan SSR	3	Dinamo Gandzha, Goyazan Kazakh, Karabakh Agdam
7	Armenian SSR	2	Ararat-2 Yerevan, Lori Kirovakan
7	Moldavian SSR	2	Tigina Bendery, Zaria Beltsy
9	Kyrgyz SSR	1	Alga Bishkek
9	Tajik SSR	1	Vakhsh Kourgan‑Tyube
9	Turkmen SSR	1	Kopet-Dag Ashkhabat

== See also ==
- 1991 Soviet Top League
- 1991 Soviet First League
- 1991 Soviet Second League B
