= FC Gornyak =

- Full name: FC Gornyak
- Founded: 1990
- Dissolved: 2008; 17 years ago
- League: Kazakhstan First Division, SW
- 2008: 14th

FC Gornyak (Kazakh: Горняк футбол клубы, Gornıak Fýtbol Klýby) is a defunct Kazakhstani football club that was based in Khromtau.

== History ==
Gornyak started the 1996 Premier League season, but withdrew after 4 games, with their results being annulled. During the 2008 season, Gornyak suffered financial problems, which resulted in them withdrawing from the league during the middle of the season.

=== Names ===
- 1990 : Founded as Gornyak

=== Domestic history ===
Season	League									Kazakhstan Cup	Top goalscorer		Manager
Season	Div.	Pos.	Pl.	W	D	L	GS	GA	P	Kazakhstan Cup	Name	League	Manager
1992	1st	8th	26	8	7	11	24	29	23				
1993	1st	3rd	22	12	6	4	36	28	30				
1994	1st	12th	30	8	6	16	29	60	22				
1995	1st	5th	30	14	8	8	49	27	50		(Kazakhstan) Vladimir Korolev	19	
1996	1st	19th	4	0	0	0	0	0	0				
2001	2nd	8th	4	0	0	4	4	12	0	-			
2003	2nd	2nd	20	13	1	6	38	28	40	Second round			
2004	2nd	6th	24	11	2	11	37	40	35	Second round			
2005	2nd	4th	22	13	3	6	30	26	42	Second round			
2006	2nd	3rd	26	17	1	8	40	25	52	Second round			
2007	2nd	6th	22	7	6	9	31	39	27	First round			
2008	2nd	14th	26	1	1	24	11	77	4	First round			
