= FC Shakhter Karagandy =

Kazakh football club

Shakhter Karagandy
- Full name: "Шахтер" футбол клубы Football Club Shakhter
- Nickname: Кеншілер (The Miners)
- Founded: 1958; 68 years ago
- Ground: Shakhter Stadium; Karagandy, Kazakhstan
- Capacity: 19,000
- Chairman: Erlan Urazaev
- Manager: Jiří Jarošík
- League: Kazakhstan First League
- 2024: 13th of 13 (Relegated)
- Website: shahter.kz
Away colours	Third colours

Football Club Shakhter (Kazakh: «Шахтер» футбол клубы / "Şahter" futbol kluby), commonly referred to as FC Shakhter Karagandy (Kazakh: Қарағанды / Qarağandy [qɑrɑˈʁɑndə]), is a professional football club based in Karaganda, Kazakhstan. They had been members of the Kazakhstan Premier League since its foundation in 1992, but were relegated to the first division in 2024. They have won the championship twice.

== History ==
After reaching third place in 1995 and 2007, their first championship was won in 2011. Before this they were one of the leading Kazakh teams in the football of the Soviet Union.

On 18 September 2006, Brazilian forward Nilton Pereira Mendes died after collapsing during a training session with the club.

On 19 September 2008, Shakhter and Vostok were disqualified from the Kazakhstan Premier League for playing a fixed match, club coaches and management involved were banned from football for 60 months. On 2 October 2008, the FFK revisited their decisions. Shakhter were deducted nine points, Vostok were immediately expelled from the competition. The result of the game in question has been cancelled and all remaining Vostok games will be counted as won by 3–0 for their opponents.

On 20 August 2013, Shakhter defeated Scottish champions Celtic by 2–0 at home in 2013–14 UEFA Champions League play-off round first leg. However, Celtic won the return leg by 3–0 and Shakhter dropped into the Europa League – the first time a Kazakh club has progressed to the group stage of a European competition. Shakhter were eliminated from the Europa League by finishing fourth in a group containing PAOK, Maccabi Haifa and AZ which was so far, their only appearance in a group stage.

On 9 January 2018, Uladzimir Zhuravel was appointed as Shakhter Karagandy's new manager. Zhuravel resigned as manager on 3 July 2018, with Andrei Finonchenko taking charge in a temporary manner. On 18 July 2018, Nikolay Kostov was confirmed as Shakhter Karagandy's new manager. On 30 December 2019, Vyacheslav Hroznyi was announced as the new manager of Shakhter Karagandy, leaving on 17 June 2020 by mutual consent. The following day, 18 June 2020, Konstantin Gorovenka was announced as the clubs new manager. After Konstantin Gorovenka left the club at the end of the 2020 season, Shakhter Karagandy announced Ali Aliyev as their new manager on 20 January 2021. Less than three months later, and after suffering 5 defeats in 6 games, Aliyev resigned from his position on 10 April 2021 with Andrei Finonchenko being appoint as the clubs Caretaker Manager. Six days later, 16 April 2021, Shakhter Karagandy announced Magomed Adiyev as their new head coach. On 5 May 2022, Adiyev was appointed as manager of the Kazakhstan national team, with Vakhid Masudov returning as his replacement on 28 June 2022 after a period where Konstantin Emeljanov was acting head coach.

=== Domestic history ===
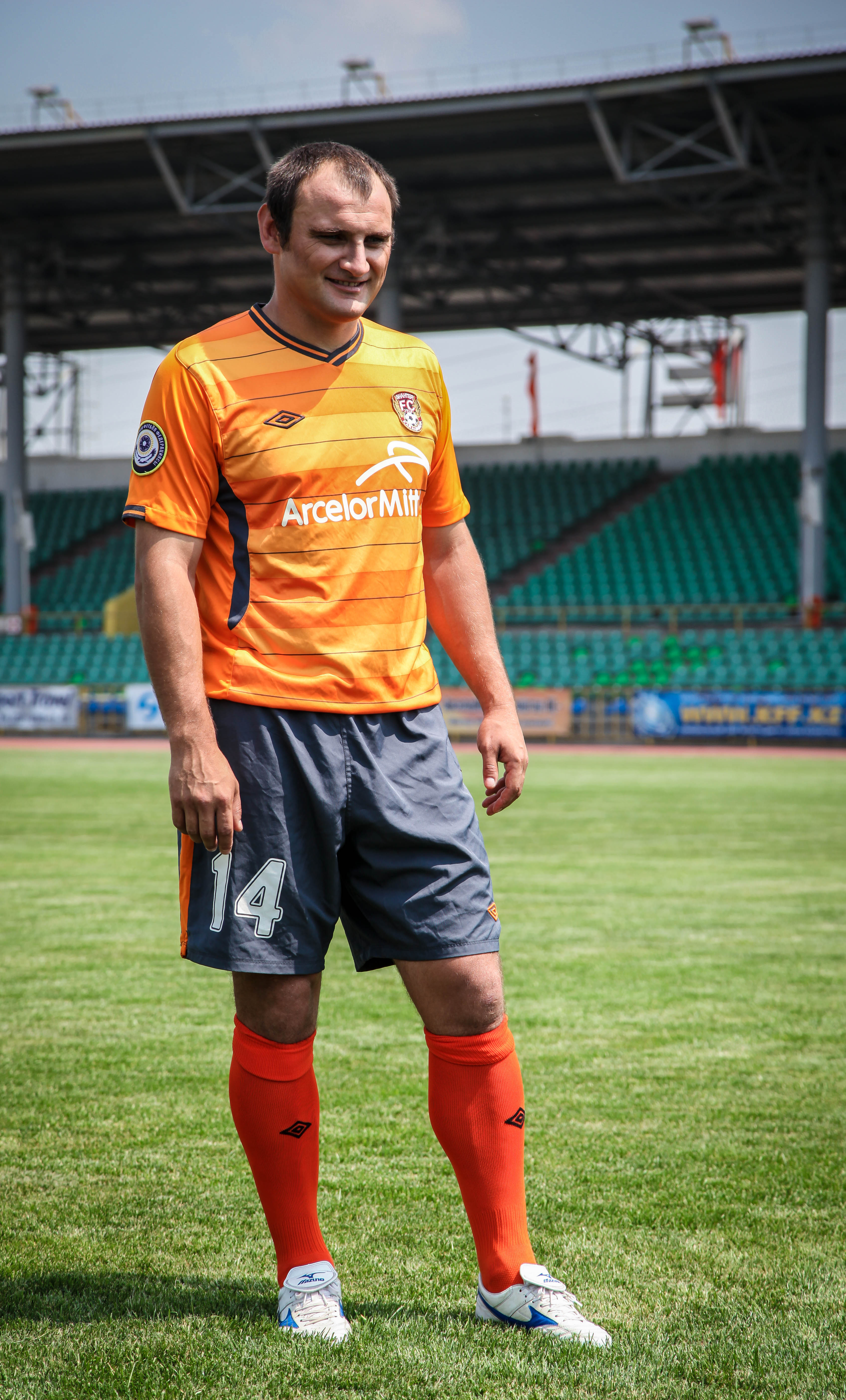
Andrei Finonchenko scored 104 league goals in 346 league appearances for Shakhter Karagandy.

Season	Level	Pos	Pld	W	D	L	For	Against	Points	Domestic Cup	Top goalscorer
1992	1st	7	26	8	12	6	24	22	36	First round	
1993	1st	6	22	8	6	8	25	29	22	Quarter-final	
1994	1st	6	30	11	12	7	45	38	34	Semi-final	
1995	1st	3	30	18	6	6	43	24	60	Quarter-final	
1996	1st	8	34	14	10	10	42	40	52	Quarter-final	(Kazakhstan) Askar Abildaev – 14
1997	1st	4	26	16	4	6	40	22	52	Quarter-final	(Kazakhstan) Ruslan Imankulov – 8
1998	1st	9	26	8	4	14	29	32	28	Quarter-final	
1999	1st	10	30	11	4	15	28	35	37	Last 16	
2000	1st	5	28	14	6	8	38	26	48	Semi-final	(Kazakhstan) Ruslan Imankulov – 12
2001	1st	12	32	10	10	12	31	37	40	Last 16	(Kazakhstan) Ruslan Imankulov – 11
2002	1st	5	32	13	7	12	37	40	46	Semi-final	(Kazakhstan) Evgeniy Lunev – 16
2003	1st	10	32	10	12	10	37	29	42	Last 16	(Kazakhstan) Andrei Finonchenko – 16
2004	1st	9	36	16	9	11	44	28	57	Last 16	
2005	1st	4	30	19	2	9	37	22	59	Last 16	(Kazakhstan) Andrei Finonchenko – 11
2006	1st	4	30	15	5	10	35	24	50	Semi-final	(Kazakhstan) Andrei Finonchenko – 16
2007	1st	3	30	17	7	6	45	23	58	Quarter-final	(Latvia) Mihails Miholaps – 8
2008	1st	7	29	11	13	5	41	26	37	Last 16	
2009	1st	3	26	18	3	5	50	18	57	Runners-up	(Kazakhstan) Serhiy Kostyuk – 11
2010	1st	6	32	11	8	13	32	30	41	Runners-up	
2011	1st	1	32	19	6	7	52	29	42	Quarter-final	(Kazakhstan) Sergei Khizhnichenko – 16
2012	1st	1	26	17	2	7	48	15	53	Semi-final	(Lithuania) Gediminas Vičius – 7
2013	1st	5	32	12	7	13	43	45	26	Winners	(Belarus) Ihar Zyankovich – 6 (Kazakhstan) Andrei Finonchenko – 7
2014	1st	6	32	11	6	15	41	49	21	Semi-final	(Bosnia and Herzegovina) Mihret Topčagić – 10
2015	1st	10	32	9	5	18	27	47	23	Second round	(Bosnia and Herzegovina) Mihret Topčagić – 6
2016	1st	9	32	10	6	16	25	40	36	Last 16	(Netherlands) Desley Ubbink – 6
2017	1st	7	33	12	4	17	36	50	40	Semi-final	(Serbia) Milan Stojanović – 10
2018	1st	8	33	8	12	13	29	36	36	Semi-final	(Montenegro) Damir Kojašević – 8
2019	1st	9	33	9	8	16	40	47	35	Last 16	(Estonia) Sergei Zenjov – 8 (Croatia) Ivan Pešić – 8
2020	1st	4	20	9	5	6	29	22	32	-	(Kazakhstan) Aydos Tattybaev – 5 (Russia) Arsen Khubulov – 5
2021	1st	6	26	9	6	11	25	34	33	Runners-up	(Kazakhstan) Aydos Tattybaev – 4
2022	1st	7	26	9	5	12	34	35	32	Quarterfinal	(Kazakhstan) Roman Murtazayev – 6
2023	1st	10	26	7	8	11	31	36	29	Quarterfinal	(Kazakhstan) Ivan Sviridov – 7
2024	1st	13	24	2	4	18	12	45	10	Round of 16	(Georgia (country)) Imeda Ashortia – 4

=== European history ===
As of match played 26 August 2021

Competition	S	P	W	D	L	GF	GA	GD
UEFA Champions League	2	8	4	1	3	10	8	+2
UEFA Europa League	4	18	6	4	8	24	24	0
UEFA Europa Conference League	1	6	1	2	3	3	5	–3
UEFA Cup	1	2	0	1	1	1	2	–1
UEFA Intertoto Cup	1	2	1	0	1	4	6	–2
Total	9	36	12	8	16	42	46	–4

Season	Competition	Round	Club	Home	Away	Aggregate
2006	UEFA Intertoto Cup	1R	(Belarus) MTZ-RIPO Minsk	1–5	3–1	4–6
2008–09	UEFA Cup	1Q	(Hungary) Debrecen	1–1	0–1	1–2
2010–11	UEFA Europa League	1Q	(Poland) Ruch Chorzów	1–2	0–1	1–3
2011–12	UEFA Europa League	1Q	(Slovenia) Koper	2–1	1–1	3–2
2011–12	UEFA Europa League	2Q	(Republic of Ireland) St Patrick's Athletic	2–1	0–2	2–3
2012–13	UEFA Champions League	2Q	(Czech Republic) Slovan Liberec	1–1 (a.e.t.)	0–1	1–2
2013–14	UEFA Champions League	2Q	(Belarus) BATE Borisov	1–0	1–0	2–0
2013–14	UEFA Champions League	3Q	(Albania) Skënderbeu	3–0	2–3	5–3
2013–14	UEFA Champions League	PO	(Scotland) Celtic	2–0	0–3	2–3
2013–14	UEFA Europa League	Group L	(Netherlands) AZ	1–1	0–1	4th place
2013–14	UEFA Europa League	Group L	(Greece) PAOK	0–2	1–2	4th place
2013–14	UEFA Europa League	Group L	(Israel) Maccabi Haifa	2–2	1–2	4th place
2014–15	UEFA Europa League	1Q	(Armenia) Shirak	4–0	2–1	6–1
2014–15	UEFA Europa League	2Q	(Lithuania) Atlantas	3–0	0–0	3–0
2014–15	UEFA Europa League	3Q	(Croatia) Hajduk Split	4–2	0–3	4–5
2021–22	UEFA Europa Conference League	2Q	(Romania) FCSB	2–1 (a.e.t.)	0–1	2–2 (5–3 p)
2021–22	UEFA Europa Conference League	3Q	(Ukraine) Kolos Kovalivka	0–0 (a.e.t.)	0–0	0–0 (3–1 p)
2021–22	UEFA Europa Conference League	PO	(Israel) Maccabi Tel Aviv	1–2	0–2	1–4

Notes

- 1R: First round
- 1Q: First qualifying round
- 2Q: Second qualifying round
- 3Q: Third qualifying round
- PO: Play-off round

== Honours ==
- Kazakhstan Premier League: 2

2011, 2012

- Kazakhstan Cup: 1

2013

- Kazakhstan Super Cup: 1

2013

- Soviet First League: 1

1962

== Current squad ==
As of 15 August, 2026

Note: Flags indicate national team as defined under FIFA eligibility rules; some limited exceptions apply. Players may hold more than one non-FIFA nationality.

No.	Pos.	Nation	Player
3	DF	KAZ	Daulet Zaynetdinov
5	DF	KAZ	Lev Skvortsov
7	FW	KAZ	Arman Nusip
8	MF	KAZ	Rafail Ospanov
9	FW	KAZ	Artem Litosh
10	FW	KAZ	Vladislav Prokopenko
11	FW	KAZ	Maksim Galkin
15	DF	KAZ	Kasymzhan Taipov
17	FW	KAZ	Alen Aymanov
18	MF	KAZ	Maksim Kholod
19	MF	KAZ	Roman Asylbaev
20	FW	KAZ	Dias Kalybaev
21	FW	KAZ	Alen Pak
22	MF	KAZ	Miras Kobeev
23	FW	KAZ	Rifat Nurmugamet

No.	Pos.	Nation	Player
25	DF	KAZ	Ali Akylbaev
27	MF	KAZ	Alan Azamat
28	DF	KAZ	Danila Vasilchenko
30	GK	KAZ	Igor Shatsky
35	GK	KAZ	Azamat Zhomartov
55	GK	KAZ	Nikita Kildzhiev
56	DF	KAZ	Nurali Azatkazy
57	MF	KAZ	Alikhan Israilov
66	MF	KAZ	Nurkhan Kagazbaev
68	DF	KAZ	Aleksandr Migunov
71	MF	KAZ	Daniyal Nazarov
72	DF	KAZ	Mark Bogachev
79	FW	KAZ	Gleb Makridov
88	MF	KAZ	Andrey Ulshin

== Managers ==
- (Soviet Union) Anatoly Krutikov (1977)
- (Soviet Union) Lev Burchalkin (1990–1991)
- (Kazakhstan) Vakhid Masudov (2000)
- (Kazakhstan) Sergei Gorokhovodatskiy (2001–July 2003)
- (Finland) Juha Malinen (2007)
- (Georgia (country)) Revaz Dzodzuashvili (1 Jan 2007 – 1 June 2008)
- (Kazakhstan) Vladimir Cheburin (2009–2010)
- (Russia) Viktor Kumykov (1 Jan 2011 – Dec 2014)

Information correct as of match played 28 November 2021. Only competitive matches are counted.

Name	Nat.	From	To	P	W	D	L	GS	GA	%W	Honours	Notes
Vladimir Cheburin	Kazakhstan	11 December 2014	6 May 2015	11	1	2	8	8	20	9.09		
Evgeny Sveshnikov	Kazakhstan	6 May 2015	5 June 2015	4	0	0	4	0	8	0.00		
Ihor Zakhariak	Ukraine	5 June 2015	December 2015	18	8	3	7	19	21	44.44		
Jozef Vukušič	Slovakia	8 January 2016	3 August 2016	22	4	6	12	8	31	18.18		
Aleksei Yeryomenko	Russia	4 August 2016	29 May 2017	24	8	3	13	30	36	33.33		
Saulius Širmelis	Lithuania	2 June 2017	31 December 2017	21	10	1	10	23	27	47.62		
Uladzimir Zhuravel	Belarus	9 January 2018	3 July 2018	20	5	6	9	15	20	25.00		
Andrei Finonchenko (Caretaker)	Kazakhstan	3 July 2018	18 July 2018	2	0	0	2	1	4	0.00		
Nikolay Kostov	Bulgaria	18 July 2018	30 December 2019	49	13	16	20	57	61	26.53		
Vyacheslav Hroznyi	Ukraine	30 December 2019	17 June 2020	2	1	0	1	2	3	50.00		
Konstantin Gorovenka	Kazakhstan	18 June 2020	31 December 2020	18	8	5	5	27	19	44.44		
Ali Aliyev	Kazakhstan	20 January 2021	10 April 2021	6	1	0	5	2	12	16.67		
Andrei Finonchenko (Caretaker)	Kazakhstan	10 April 2021	16 April 2021	1	0	0	1	1	2	0.00		
Magomed Adiyev	Russia	16 April 2021	5 May 2022	40	19	9	12	69	48	47.50		
Konstantin Emeljanov (Caretaker)	Kazakhstan	5 May 2022	28 June 2022	5	1	1	3	3	7	20.00		
Vakhid Masudov	Russia	28 June 2022	31 December 2022	20	7	4	9	30	33	35.00		
Igor Soloshenko	Kazakhstan	18 January 2023		6	1	1	4	8	11	16.67		
Jiří Jarošík	Czech Republic	5 November 2024		0	0	0	0	0	0	—		

- Notes:

P – Total of played matches W – Won matches D – Drawn matches L – Lost matches GS – Goal scored GA – Goals against
%W – Percentage of matches won

Nationality is indicated by the corresponding FIFA country code(s).

== See also ==
- Kazakhstani football clubs in European competitions
