= Ulugbek Bakayev =

Uzbek footballer (born 1978)

Personal information
- Date of birth: 28 November 1978 (age 47)
- Place of birth: Bukhoro, Uzbek SSR, Soviet Union
- Height: 1.83 m (6 ft 0 in)
- Position: Forward

Team information
- Current team: Bukhara (Manager)

Senior career*
Years	Team	Apps	(Gls)
1997–2000	FK Buxoro	80	(29)
2001	CSKA Moscow	7	(0)
2001–2002	Torpedo-ZIL Moscow	20	(0)
2003	FK Buxoro	7	(4)
2003	FK Andijan	3	(1)
2003	Neftekhimik Nizhnekamsk	11	(4)
2004–2007	Tobol	111	(55)
2008–2009	Bunyodkor	22	(8)
2009	→ FK Samarqand-Dinamo (loan)	12	(4)
2010	Tobol	27	(16)
2011	Zhetysu	29	(18)
2011	Dubai Club	8	(0)
2012–2014	Irtysh Pavlodar	70	(22)
2014	FK Buxoro	9	(3)
2015	Navbahor Namangan	2	(0)
Total		418	(165)

International career
2001–2014	Uzbekistan	53	(14)

Managerial career
- 2017–2018: Bukhara
- 2019–2022: Sogdiana Jizzakh
- 2023–: Bukhara
- * Club domestic league appearances and goals

Ulugbek Bakayev (Uzbek: Улуғбек Бақоев, Ulugʻbek Baqoyev, Russian: Улугбек Бакаев; born 28 November 1978) is an Uzbekistani football coach and a former player who is the manager of Bukhara.

== Club career ==
Bakayev played spent most of his career with Kazakhstan football clubs. Playing in the Kazakhstan Premier League, he scored a total of 111 goals (as of 12 July 2014) and became the league's top scorer four times. From 2012 to 2014, he played for Irtysh Pavlodar. In 2012, he became best goal scorer of League with 14 goals and was named Footballer of the Year in Kazakhstan. In August 2014, he signed a contract with his former club FK Buxoro. On 26 January 2017, he became head coach of FK Buxoro.

== International career ==
Bakayev was a member of the Uzbekistan national team. At the 2011 Asian Cup he scored two goals against Jordan in a 2–1 win to put Uzbekistan into the semi-finals. On 29 May 2014, in Tashkent, he played his farewell match for national team against Oman.

== Honours ==
Bunyodkor

- Uzbek League: 2008
- Uzbek Cup: 2008

Tobol

- Kazakhstan Premier League: 2010
- Kazakhstan Cup: 2007

Zhetysu

- Kazakhstan Premier League runner-up: 2011

Irtysh Pavlodar

- Kazakhstan Premier League runner-up: 2012
- Kazakhstan Cup: 2012

Uzbekistan

- AFC Asian Cup 4th place: 2011

Individual

- Kazakhstan Premier League top scorer: 2004, 2010, 2011, 2012
- Kazakhstan Premier League Best Player (Almaz award): 2011, 2012
- Kazakhstani Footballer of the Year: 2012
