= 2001 Kazakhstan Premier League =

Kazakhstan Premier League
- Season: 2001
- Champions: Zhenis Astana
- Relegated: Ekibastuzets; Zhetysu; Taraz; Dostyk; Mangystau
- Champions League: Zhenis Astana
- UEFA Cup: Atyrau; Kairat
- Matches: 272
- Goals: 679 (2.5 per match)
- Top goalscorer: Arsen Tlekhugov (30)

The 2001 Kazakhstan Premier League was the tenth season of the Kazakhstan Premier League, the highest football league competition in Kazakhstan, and took place between 28 April and 22 October.

== Teams ==
Zhiger were relegated at the end of the 2000 season, and were replaced by FC Aktobe-Lento, FC Mangystau and Atyrau. Batyr were reformed as Ekibastuzets-NK and CSKA Kairat became Kairat.

In addition to the changes in clubs in the Kazakhstan Premier League, there weer various name changes as well. Access-Golden-Grain became Esil Bogatyr, Akmola became Esil and Kaisar-Hurricane returned to being called Kaisar.

=== Team overview ===
Locations of teams in the 2001 Kazakhstan Premier League

Team	Location	Venue	Capacity
Aktobe-Lento	Aktobe	Central Stadium	13,200
Atyrau	Atyrau	Munaishy Stadium	9,500
Dostyk	Shymkent	Kazhimukan Munaitpasov Stadium	20,000
Ekibastuzets-NK	Ekibastuz	Shakhtyor Stadium	6,300
Esil	Kokshetau	Okzhetpes Stadium	4,158
Esil Bogatyr	Petropavl	Karasai Stadium	11,000
Irtysh	Pavlodar	Central Stadium	15,000
Kairat	Almaty	Central Stadium	23,804
Kaisar	Kyzylorda	Gany Muratbayev Stadium	7,500
Mangystau	Aktau	Zhastar Stadium	3,500
Shakhter-Ispat-Karmet	Karagandy	Shakhter Stadium	20,000
Taraz	Taraz	Central Stadium	12,525
Tobol	Kostanay	Central Stadium	8,323
Vostok Altyn	Oskemen	Vostok Stadium	8,500
Yelimay	Semey	Spartak Stadium	
Zhenis Astana	Astana	Kazhymukan Munaitpasov Stadium	12,350
Zhetysu	Taldykorgan	Zhetysu Stadium	4,000

== League table ==
Pos	Team	Pld	W	D	L	GF	GA	GD	Pts	Qualification or relegation
1	Zhenis Astana (C)	32	26	3	3	78	30	+48	81	Qualification for the Champions League first qualifying round
2	Atyrau	32	21	7	4	53	16	+37	70	Qualification for the UEFA Cup qualifying round
3	Esil Bogatyr	32	21	6	5	51	16	+35	69	
4	Irtysh	32	17	9	6	48	22	+26	60	
5	Kairat	32	15	7	10	42	33	+9	52	Qualification for the UEFA Cup qualifying round
6	Tobol	32	15	4	13	48	43	+5	49	
7	Yelimay	32	14	6	12	47	42	+5	48	
8	Aktobe-Lento	32	13	6	13	33	40	−7	45	
9	Vostok Altyn	32	13	5	14	42	43	−1	44	
10	Esil	32	12	8	12	35	37	−2	44	
11	Kaisar	32	11	7	14	33	40	−7	40	
12	Shakhter-Ispat-Karmet	32	10	10	12	31	37	−6	40	
13	Ekibastuzets-NK (R)	32	10	7	15	30	49	−19	37	Relegation to the Kazakhstan First Division
14	Zhetysu (R)	32	7	5	20	38	57	−19	26	Relegation to the Kazakhstan First Division
15	Taraz (R)	32	6	3	23	26	57	−31	21	Relegation to the Kazakhstan First Division
16	Dostyk (R)	32	4	9	19	28	58	−30	21	Relegation to the Kazakhstan First Division
17	Mangystau (R)	32	3	6	23	16	59	−43	15	Relegation to the Kazakhstan First Division

Source: kpfl.kz
Rules for classification: 1) points; 2) goal difference; 3) number of goals scored.
(C) Champions; (R) Relegated

== Results ==
Home \ Away	AKT	ATY	DOS	EKI	ESK	EBP	IRT	KRT	KSR	MAN	SHA	TAR	TOB	VOS	YEL	ZHN	ZHE
Aktobe-Lento		1–0	3–1	0–1	1–0	0–0	0–1	0–1	1–0	1–0	2–1	3–0	2–0	1–0	2–1	2–4	1–1
Atyrau	1–0		5–0	3–0	2–1	1–2	1–1	1–0	2–0	1–0	3–0	4–1	3–0	1–0	6–1	0–0	2–1
Dostyk	1–2	0–0		5–0	1–2	0–0	0–0	0–2	1–2	3–0 (Note: Match awarded.)	0–1	1–0	0–2	0–2	1–2	3–5	1–0
Ekibastuzets-NK	1–1	0–2	2–1		4–1	0–2	1–1	1–1	0–0	1–0	2–0	2–1	2–1	1–1	0–0	0–3	2–1
Esil	1–1	0–1	3–0	2–0		1–1	1–0	1–0	0–1	0–0	0–0	2–1	2–0	0–0	1–0	1–5	1–2
Esil Bogatyr	4–0	1–2	5–0	2–0	2–0		2–0	1–0	2–0	3–0	1–0	1–0	1–0	2–1	1–0	2–0	2–1
Irtysh Pavlodar	1–0	0–0	5–1	1–0	1–2	1–0		1–2	1–0	4–0	0–0	5–0	4–0	4–0	2–0	2–1	2–0
Kairat	3–0	1–1	1–1	2–1	2–1	0–2	1–1		3–1	1–3	2–1	2–1	3–2	3–1	0–0	2–0	2–1
Kaisar	3–1	0–0	2–2	1–3	1–1	2–1	0–2	1–1		3–0	2–0	1–0	1–2	1–4	2–0	1–3	1–1
Mangystau	0–4	1–1	0–0	1–1	0–3	1–1	0–1	0–2	0–2		0–1	2–1	2–1	1–3	0–3	0–1	1–2
Shakhter-Ispat-Karmet	4–0	0–2	1–1	1–0	3–0	2–0	0–0	1–1	1–0	2–2		1–1	1–2	0–0	2–4	0–5	1–0
Taraz	1–2	0–1	2–0	0–1	0–0	1–1	0–2	2–1	3–0	1–0	2–3		0–2	2–0	1–5	1–2	1–0
Tobol	1–1	1–0	3–3	4–1	1–2	0–1	4–1	2–0	0–1	2–0	2–1	3–2		3–0	1–4	0–0	4–0
Vostok Altyn	3–1	1–2	2–1	2–0	1–1	1–1	3–0	1–0	1–0	3–0	0–2	2–0	1–2		2–0	2–3	2–1
Yelimay	3–0	0–1	0–0	2–1	1–0	0–1	1–2	3–1	2–2	2–1	0–0	2–1	1–1	3–1		1–3	2–0
Zhenis Astana	2–0	2–1	1–0	3–1	4–2	2–1	1–1	1–0	2–0	2–0	3–1	2–0	3–0	3–1	4–1		4–2
Zhetysu	0–0	1–3	3–0	4–1	1–3	0–5	1–1	0–2	0–2	3–1	0–0	4–0	0–2	4–1	2–3	2–4	

Legend: Blue = home team win; Yellow = draw; Red = away team win.

== Season statistics ==
=== Top scorers ===
As of match played 22 October 2001

Rank	Player	Club	Goals
1	(Kazakhstan) Arsen Tlekhugov	Zhenis Astana	30
2	(Kazakhstan) Guram Makayev	Atyrau	17
3	(Kazakhstan) Kairat Aubakirov	Yelimay	13
4	(Kazakhstan) Nurbol Zhumaskaliyev	Tobol	12
5	(Kazakhstan) Ruslan Imankulov	Shakhter-Ispat-Karmet	11
6	(Kazakhstan) Yuri Aksenov	Zhenis Astana	10
6	(Kazakhstan) Vladimir Gurtuev	Zhenis Astana/Esil	10
