= FC Yelimay =

Kazakh football club

Yelimay
- Full name: Football Club Yelimay; Елімай футбол клубы
- Founded: 1964; 62 years ago
- Ground: Spartak Stadium; Semey, Kazakhstan
- Capacity: 8,196
- Chairman: Akhmedzhan Kazakbayev
- Manager: Peter Leven
- League: Kazakhstan Premier League
- 2026: Kazakhstan Premier League, 6th of 13
- Website: fcelimai.kz
Home colours	Away colours

FC Yelimay (Kazakh: Елімай футбол клубы, Elimay futbol kluby) is a Kazakh professional football club based in Semey. A leading club in the early years of the Kazakhstan Premier League, then named Yelimay Semey (or simply "Yelimay"), they were three-time champions of Kazakhstan in 1994, 1995 and 1998. They are currently in Premier League.

== History ==
The club's predecessor is the Soviet team of masters of the local brick factory in Semey, hence the name Tsementnik (cement producer). The team of masters spent some 28 seasons in the Soviet Second League (Class B).

Following the dissolution of the Soviet Union, in the mid 1990s the club became one of the leaders of the Kazakhstani championship as Yelimay . Yelim-Ai (or Elim-ay) is the name of a historic poem of Kazakh people.

FC Yelimay most recently won the Kazakh league while the Football Federation of Kazakhstan were AFC affiliates. After Kazakhstan switched to UEFA affiliation, Yelimay were relegated to the second-tier Kazakhstan First Division.

After the merger of former Semey Province into East Kazakhstan Province in 1997, the city of Semey was no longer a province capital. Thus, all financial support from the former province went to Oskemen, the current province capital.

=== Names ===
- 1964 : Tsementnik
- 1971 : Spartak
- 1994 : Yelimay
- 1999 : AES-Yelimay
- 2001 : Yelimay
- 2004 : Semey
- 2008 : Spartak
- 2022 : Yelimay

=== Domestic history ===
Season	League									Kazakhstan Cup	Top goalscorer		Manager
Season	Div.	Pos.	Pl.	W	D	L	GS	GA	P	Kazakhstan Cup	Name	League	Manager
1992	1st	14	26	5	3	18	25	60	13				
1993	1st	17	24	13	4	7	32	35	30				
1994	1st	1	30	20	7	3	70	29	47		(Kazakhstan) Kairat Aubakirov	16	
1995	1st	1	30	21	4	5	68	23	67	Winners	(Kazakhstan) Andrei Miroshnichenko	23	
1996	1st	3	34	22	8	4	67	17	74		(Kazakhstan) Bolat Esmagambetov	14	
1997	1st	7	26	13	7	6	41	26	46		(Kazakhstan) Oleg Litvinenko	8	
1998	1st	1	26	20	3	3	60	20	63		(Kazakhstan) Oleg Litvinenko	14	
1999	1st	9	30	12	4	14	35	36	40				
2000	1st	8	28	12	5	11	43	33	41		(Kazakhstan) Kairat Aubakirov	15	
2001	1st	7	32	14	6	12	47	42	48		(Kazakhstan) Kairat Aubakirov	13	
2002	1st	8	32	11	6	15	33	51	39				
2003	1st	9	32	12	7	13	35	35	43				
2004	1st	19	36	4	1	31	25	84	13				
2005	2nd	2	24	18	5	1	76	17	59				
2006	2nd	4	24	12	7	5	46	25	43				
2007	2nd	9	26	7	8	11	29	49	29				
2008	2nd	3	26	13	8	5	50	35	47	First round			
2009	2nd	7	26	12	2	12	35	41	38	First round			
2010	2nd	4	34	19	7	8	68	40	64	First round			
2011	2nd	14	32	8	8	16	36	53	32	First round			
2012	2nd	6	30	14	4	12	38	45	46	First round			
2013	2nd	2	34	21	7	6	54	24	70	First round	(Uzbekistan) Paul Puryshkin	13	
2014	1st	12	32	7	7	18	30	52	21	First round	(Serbia) Nemanja Jovanović	7	(Kazakhstan) Almas Kulshinbayev
2015	2nd	6	24	11	6	7	34	19	39	Second round			(Russia) Aleksei Petrushin
2016	Did not participate in professional divisions												
2017	Did not participate in professional divisions												
2018	Did not participate in professional divisions												
2019	Did not participate in professional divisions												
2020	Did not participate in professional divisions												
2021	Did not participate in professional divisions												
2022	Did not participate in professional divisions												
2023	2nd	1	28	24	4	0	76	17	76	Playoff stage	(Georgia (country)) Beka Kavtaradze	19	
2024	1st	6	24	10	7	7	35	32	37	Semi-finals	(Belarus) Nikita Korzun	7	(Kazakhstan) Andrey Karpovich
2025	1st	4	26	14	6	6	47	31	48	Quarter-finals	(Togo) Euloge Placca Fessou	9	(Kazakhstan) Andrey Karpovich
2026	1st	6	30	12	9	9	43	44	45	Quarter-finals	(Kazakhstan) Roman Murtazayev	10	(Kazakhstan) Andrey Karpovich

=== Continental history ===
Season	Competition	Round	Club	Home	Away	Aggregate
1995	Asian Club Championship	First round	(Uzbekistan) Neftchi Fargʻona	1–3	4–1	5–4
1995	Asian Club Championship	Second round	(Saudi Arabia) Al-Nassr	0–1	0–3^{1}	0–4^{1}
1996–97	Asian Club Championship	First round	(Kyrgyzstan) AiK Bishkek	4–2	2–1	6–3
1996–97	Asian Club Championship	Second round	(Iran) Persepolis	3–0	0–5	3–5
2026–27	UEFA Conference League	First qualifying round	(Armenia) Alashkert	2–2 (a.e.t.)	1–1	3–3 (5–6 p)

^{1} Yelimay Semey withdrew after the 1st leg.

== Current squad ==
As of 15 August 2026

Note: Flags indicate national team as defined under FIFA eligibility rules; some limited exceptions apply. Players may hold more than one non-FIFA nationality.

No.	Pos.	Nation	Player
1	GK	KAZ	Egor Tsuprikov
2	DF	KAZ	Adi Adambaev
4	DF	KAZ	Adilbek Zhumakhanov
5	DF	CRO	Marin Belančić
6	DF	KAZ	Ermek Abdulla
7	FW	KAZ	Roman Murtazayev
8	MF	KAZ	Miras Omatay
9	FW	COL	Roger Murillo
10	FW	KAZ	Zhan-Ali Payruz
11	FW	KAZ	Ivan Sviridov
14	FW	COL	Dubán Palacio
15	DF	SLO	Maj Mittendorfer
17	FW	KAZ	Akmal Bakhtiyarov
18	MF	KAZ	Ramazan Orazov

No.	Pos.	Nation	Player
19	FW	KAZ	Aybar Zhaksylykov
20	MF	KAZ	Arsen Ashirbek
22	GK	KAZ	Nikita Pivkin
23	DF	CRO	Hrvoje Ilić
26	DF	SRB	Strahinja Tanasijević
32	GK	RUS	Ivan Konovalov
44	MF	KAZ	Almas Tyulyubay
67	MF	KAZ	Artem Zhilin
77	FW	TOG	Euloge Placca Fessou
83	MF	KAZ	Alizhan Baygaliev
88	MF	KAZ	Asan Baygaliev
89	FW	BRA	China
90	DF	KAZ	Sanzhar Sansyzbaev

=== Out on loan ===
Note: Flags indicate national team as defined under FIFA eligibility rules; some limited exceptions apply. Players may hold more than one non-FIFA nationality.

No. / Pos. / Nation / Player	No. / Pos. / Nation / Player

== Honours ==
- Kazakhstan Premier League (3): 1994, 1995, 1998
- Kazakhstan First Division (1): 2023
- Kazakhstan Cup (1): 1995
- Kazakhstan Super Cup (1): 1995
