= FC Dinamo Alma-Ata =

FC Dinamo Almaty
- Full name: FC Dinamo Almaty
- Founded: 1937
- League: Kazakhstan Super League
- 1993 Kazakhstan Premier League: 18th
| Home colours | Away colours |

FC Dinamo Almaty (Kazakh: Динамо футбол клубы, Dınamo fýtbol klýby) are a Kazakhstani football club based in Almaty, Kazakhstan. The club played in the Kazakhstan Super League in season 1993.

== Name history ==
- 1937 : Founded as Dinamo Almaty based in Almaty
- 1992 : Reactivated as Dinamo Almaty

== Honours ==
- Soviet winner of republican level
  - Winners (5): 1937, 1938, 1946, 1954, 1955
