= FC Azhar =

- Full name: FC Azhar Kokshetau
- League: Kazakhstan Super League
- 1993: 19

FC Azhar (Kazakh: Ажар футбол клубы, Ajar Fýtbol Klýby) were a Kazakhstani football club based in Kokshetau, Kazakhstan. They were members of the Kazakhstan Super League in just two seasons 1992 and 1993.

== Name History ==
- 1992 : Founded as Zenit Kokshetau
- 1993 : The club is renamed Azhar Kokshetau

== See also ==
- FC Okzhetpes
