= FC Namys Almaty =

- Full name: FC Namys Almaty
- Founded: 1992
- League: Kazakhstan First Division
- 1995: 2 (East)

FC Namys Almaty (Kazakh: Намыс футбол клубы, Namys fýtbol klýby) are a Kazakhstani football club based in Almaty, Kazakhstan. The club played in the Kazakhstan Super League in season 1993. They were members of the Kazakhstan First Division from 1994.

== Name history ==
- 1992: Founded as Namys Almaty based in Almaty.
