= FC BGS =

Kazakhstani football club

- Full name: FC BGS
- Founded: 1992
- League: Kazakhstan First Division
- 2002: 6 (West)

FC BGS БГС (Kazakh: Ақсай футбол клубы, Aqsaı fýtbol klýby) were a Kazakhstani football team based in Aqsay, Kazakhstan. The club played in the Kazakhstan Super League in the 1993 season. They were members of the Kazakhstan First Division in 1994, but were not able to finish that season due to financial reasons. In 2002 they played in the Kazakhstan Second Division.

== Name history ==
- 1992: Founded as Karachaganak based in Aqsay
- 2002: Reactivated as BGS
