= FC Turkestan =

- Full name: Football Club Turkestan; Түркістан футбол клубы
- Founded: 1990; 36 years ago
- Ground: Kazhymukan Munaitpasov Stadium; Shymkent, Kazakhstan
- Capacity: 37,000
- Manager: Erlan Shoytymov
- League: Kazakhstan First Division
- 2025: 14th

FC Turkestan (Kazakh: Түркістан футбол клубы) is a Kazakh football club that is based in Shymkent, Kazakhstan. They were members of the Kazakhstan First Division in 2005, but were not able to finish that season due to financial reasons.

== History ==
=== Names ===
- 1990 : Founded as Montazhnik
- 1993 : Renamed Yassy
- 2003 : Renamed Yassy-Rakhat
- 2004 : Renamed Yassy-Sayram
- 2005 : Renamed Yassy
- 2023 : Renamed Turkestan

== Honours ==
- Kazakhstan First Division (1): 2003
