= List of Kazakhstan football transfers summer 2026 =

This is a list of Kazakh football transfers during the 2026 summer transfer window.

== Kazakhstan Premier League 2026 ==
=== Aktobe ===
In: Note: Flags indicate national team as defined under FIFA eligibility rules; some limited exceptions apply. Players may hold more than one non-FIFA nationality.

No.	Pos.	Nation	Player
6	MF	MKD	Jani Atanasov (from (Greece) AEL)
9	FW	ENG	Sheyi Ojo (from (Slovenia) Maribor)
13	DF	BEL	Senna Miangué (from (Hungary) ETO FC)
77	MF	GEO	Giorgi Zaria (from (Georgia (country)) Dinamo Tbilisi)
95	FW	KAZ	Abat Aymbetov (from (Romania) Petrolul Ploiești)

Out: Note: Flags indicate national team as defined under FIFA eligibility rules; some limited exceptions apply. Players may hold more than one non-FIFA nationality.

No.	Pos.	Nation	Player
3	DF	SRB	Danilo Mitrović
10	FW	SWE	Ajdin Zeljković
30	MF	BLR	Nikita Korzun (to (Belarus) Torpedo-BelAZ Zhodino)
80	MF	KAZ	Arman Kenesov (on loan to (Kazakhstan) Turan)
—	MF	KAZ	Ayan Baydavletov (on loan to (Kazakhstan) Caspiy)
—	MF	KAZ	Darkhan Berdibek (on loan to (Kazakhstan) Irtysh Pavlodar)

=== Altai ===
In: Note: Flags indicate national team as defined under FIFA eligibility rules; some limited exceptions apply. Players may hold more than one non-FIFA nationality.

No.	Pos.	Nation	Player
25	GK	UKR	Danylo Kucher (from (Romania) Concordia Chiajna)
29	FW	GEO	Elguja Lobjanidze (from (Kazakhstan) Zhenis)
45	MF	MKD	Darko Dodev (from (North Macedonia) Sileks)
98	FW	BLR	Dmitry Podstrelov (from (Belarus) Dinamo Minsk)

Out: Note: Flags indicate national team as defined under FIFA eligibility rules; some limited exceptions apply. Players may hold more than one non-FIFA nationality.

No.	Pos.	Nation	Player
6	DF	KAZ	Timur Redzhepov (to (Kazakhstan) Kaisar)
13	GK	RUS	Ivan Konovalov (to (Kazakhstan) Yelimay)

=== Astana ===
In: Note: Flags indicate national team as defined under FIFA eligibility rules; some limited exceptions apply. Players may hold more than one non-FIFA nationality.

No.	Pos.	Nation	Player
17	FW	KAZ	Damir Marat (on loan from (Kazakhstan) Tobol)
21	MF	KAZ	Aleksandr Merkel (from (Kazakhstan) Zhenis)
29	FW	CRO	Nikola Burić (from (Albania) Egnatia Rrogozhinë)
45	DF	SRB	Ivan Miladinović (from (Kazakhstan) Yelimay)

Out: Note: Flags indicate national team as defined under FIFA eligibility rules; some limited exceptions apply. Players may hold more than one non-FIFA nationality.

No.	Pos.	Nation	Player
19	FW	KAZ	Nurali Zhaksylykov (on loan to (Kazakhstan) Kaisar)
22	FW	UZB	Asilbek Abdurasulov (loan return to (Uzbekistan) Gazalkent)

=== Atyrau ===
In: Note: Flags indicate national team as defined under FIFA eligibility rules; some limited exceptions apply. Players may hold more than one non-FIFA nationality.

No.	Pos.	Nation	Player
8	MF	BIH	Mato Stanić (from (Bosnia and Herzegovina) Široki Brijeg)
15	MF	GHA	Ebenezer Ofori (from (Iraq) Al-Mosul)
20	MF	KAZ	Arsen Buranchiev (from (Kazakhstan) Irtysh Pavlodar)
44	FW	SRB	Đorđe Maksimović (from (Montenegro) Jezero)
71	DF	CRO	Franjo Prce (from (Romania) Petrolul Ploiești)
90	FW	BIH	Đorđe Pantelić (from (Russia) Spartak Kostroma)

Out: Note: Flags indicate national team as defined under FIFA eligibility rules; some limited exceptions apply. Players may hold more than one non-FIFA nationality.

No.	Pos.	Nation	Player
6	MF	BLR	Ruslan Yudenkov (to (Kazakhstan) Irtysh Pavlodar)
8	DF	RUS	Soslan Takulov
9	FW	KAZ	Abylaykhan Zhumabek (to (Kazakhstan) Taraz)
55	MF	UKR	Oleksandr Noyok (to (Kazakhstan) Kyzylzhar)
88	DF	RUS	Dmitri Yashin (to (Belarus) Slavia Mozyr)
90	FW	UKR	Dmytro Yusov

=== Caspiy ===
In: Note: Flags indicate national team as defined under FIFA eligibility rules; some limited exceptions apply. Players may hold more than one non-FIFA nationality.

No.	Pos.	Nation	Player
9	MF	KAZ	Ramazan Abylaykhan (from (Kazakhstan) Ulytau)
16	MF	KAZ	Ayan Baydavletov (on loan from (Kazakhstan) Aktobe)
15	MF	GHA	David Epton (from (Estonia) Tartu JK Tammeka)
17	MF	BLR	Vladislav Klimovich (from (Kazakhstan) Irtysh Pavlodar)
26	MF	BLR	Pavel Sedko (from (Kazakhstan) Irtysh Pavlodar)
27	DF	BLR	Danila Nechayev (from (Kazakhstan) Irtysh Pavlodar)
28	MF	KAZ	Timur Kurbanov (from (Kazakhstan) Kyzylzhar)
47	MF	KAZ	Daniyar Usenov (from (Kazakhstan) Tobol)
67	MF	KAZ	Meyrambek Kalmyrza (from (Kazakhstan) Tobol)
93	FW	FRA	Keba Sylla (from (France) Nîmes Olympique)

Out: Note: Flags indicate national team as defined under FIFA eligibility rules; some limited exceptions apply. Players may hold more than one non-FIFA nationality.

No.	Pos.	Nation	Player
5	MF	ARG	Leonel Strumia (to (Latvia) Liepāja)
9	MF	KAZ	Bakdaulet Zulfikarov (to (Kazakhstan) Ulytau)
13	MF	KAZ	Meyrambek Serikbay (loan return to (Kazakhstan) Kyzylzhar)
15	DF	KAZ	Alikhan Serikbay (loan return to (Kazakhstan) Kyzylzhar)
27	MF	KAZ	David Esimbekov (to (Kazakhstan) Irtysh Pavlodar)
28	FW	SRB	Bogdan Petrovic
33	DF	BRA	Alan Dias
67	MF	KAZ	Darkhan Berdibek (loan return to (Kazakhstan) Aktobe)
99	FW	BRA	Gustavo França

=== Elimai ===
In: Note: Flags indicate national team as defined under FIFA eligibility rules; some limited exceptions apply. Players may hold more than one non-FIFA nationality.

No.	Pos.	Nation	Player
8	MF	KAZ	Miras Omatay (from (Kazakhstan) Irtysh Pavlodar)
9	GK	COL	Roger Murillo (from (Slovenia) Primorje)
15	DF	SVN	Maj Mittendorfer (from (Slovenia) Koper)
26	DF	SRB	Strahinja Tanasijević (from (United States) New York City FC)
32	GK	RUS	Ivan Konovalov (from (Kazakhstan) Altai)

Out: Note: Flags indicate national team as defined under FIFA eligibility rules; some limited exceptions apply. Players may hold more than one non-FIFA nationality.

No.	Pos.	Nation	Player
16	DF	ALB	Edison Ndreca (to (Albania) Egnatia)
50	DF	SRB	Ivan Miladinović (to (Kazakhstan) Astana)
99	GK	POR	Vladimir Stojković

=== Irtysh Pavlodar ===
In: Note: Flags indicate national team as defined under FIFA eligibility rules; some limited exceptions apply. Players may hold more than one non-FIFA nationality.

No.	Pos.	Nation	Player
4	DF	KAZ	Demiyat Slambekov (from (Kazakhstan) Kyzylzhar)
7	FW	KAZ	Timur Mukhametzhanov (from (Kazakhstan) Akzhayik)
8	MF	KAZ	David Esimbekov (from (Kazakhstan) Caspiy)
9	FW	BRA	Leonardo Kalil (from (Thailand) Port)
17	DF	NGA	Samuel Opeh (from (Kosovo) Malisheva)
21	MF	KAZ	Darkhan Berdibek (on loan from (Kazakhstan) Aktobe)
24	MF	KAZ	Murodzhon Khalmatov (on loan from (Kazakhstan) Ordabasy)
25	DF	SRB	Marko Jevtic (from (Serbia) IMT)
29	GK	UKR	Bohdan Sarnavskyi (from (Poland) Lechia Gdańsk)
32	FW	CAN	Oluwabori Falaye (from (Albania) Tirana)
35	MF	BRA	Lucas Ramos (from (Poland) Odra Opole)
45	FW	NGA	Samson Iyede (from (Kazakhstan) Zhenis)
56	MF	BLR	Ruslan Yudenkov (from (Kazakhstan) Atyrau)
66	DF	KAZ	Sagi Malikaydar (from (Kazakhstan) Ulytau)
98	FW	KAZ	Zikrillo Sultaniyazov (from (Kazakhstan) Ordabasy)
—	FW	SRB	Dejan Vidić (from (Bosnia and Herzegovina) Sloga Doboj)

Out: Note: Flags indicate national team as defined under FIFA eligibility rules; some limited exceptions apply. Players may hold more than one non-FIFA nationality.

No.	Pos.	Nation	Player
4	DF	BLR	Ruslan Khadarkevich (to (Belarus) Minsk)
7	MF	BLR	Vladislav Klimovich (to (Kazakhstan) Caspiy)
8	MF	KAZ	Samat Zharynbetov (to (Kazakhstan) Zhenis)
9	MF	KAZ	Miras Omatay (to (Kazakhstan) Yelimay)
16	GK	RUS	Vitali Botnar (loan return to (Russia) SKA-Khabarovsk)
17	FW	KAZ	Miras Turlybek (to (Kazakhstan) Turan)
18	FW	KAZ	Vyacheslav Shvyryov (to (Kazakhstan) Zhetysu)
21	MF	KAZ	Arsen Buranchiev (to (Kazakhstan) Atyrau)
27	DF	BLR	Danila Nechayev (to (Kazakhstan) Caspiy)
33	DF	GHA	Fard Ibrahim (to (Israel) Hapoel Ramat Gan Givatayim)
45	FW	NGA	Samson Iyede
98	MF	BLR	Pavel Sedko (to (Kazakhstan) Caspiy)
—	FW	SRB	Dejan Vidić (to (Bosnia and Herzegovina) Čelik Zenica)

=== Kairat ===
In: Note: Flags indicate national team as defined under FIFA eligibility rules; some limited exceptions apply. Players may hold more than one non-FIFA nationality.

No.	Pos.	Nation	Player
22	MF	POR	Gustavo Mendonça (from (Portugal) AVS)
28	FW	ESP	Marc Gual (from (Portugal) Rio Ave)

Out: Note: Flags indicate national team as defined under FIFA eligibility rules; some limited exceptions apply. Players may hold more than one non-FIFA nationality.

No.	Pos.	Nation	Player
10	FW	KAZ	Dastan Satpayev (to (England) Chelsea)
11	MF	ARG	Sebastián Zeballos (to (Venezuela) Deportivo La Guaira)
18	MF	ISR	Dan Glazer (to (Israel) Maccabi Tel Aviv)
23	FW	KAZ	Ramazan Baghdad (on loan to (Kazakhstan) Kaisar)
99	FW	BRA	Ricardinho (loan return to (Czech Republic) Viktoria Plzeň)

=== Kaisar ===
In: Note: Flags indicate national team as defined under FIFA eligibility rules; some limited exceptions apply. Players may hold more than one non-FIFA nationality.

No.	Pos.	Nation	Player
2	DF	KAZ	Timur Redzhepov (from (Kazakhstan) Altai)
10	FW	GUI	Agostinho (from (Luxembourg) F91 Dudelange)
13	FW	KAZ	Nurali Zhaksylykov (on loan from (Kazakhstan) Astana)
14	MF	KAZ	Gustavo Zago (from (Brazil) Cruzeiro)
25	MF	SRB	Stefan Bukorac (from (Serbia) Napredak Kruševac)
43	DF	BRA	Klaidher Macedo (from (Armenia) Alashkert)
—	FW	KAZ	Ramazan Baghdad (on loan from (Kazakhstan) Kairat)

Out: Note: Flags indicate national team as defined under FIFA eligibility rules; some limited exceptions apply. Players may hold more than one non-FIFA nationality.

No.	Pos.	Nation	Player
8	MF	KAZ	Aybol Abiken (to (Kazakhstan) Kyzylzhar)
14	MF	CHI	Thomas Jones (on loan to (Chile) Deportes Iquique)
21	FW	KAZ	Dimash Serikuly (to (Kazakhstan) Kyzylzhar)
51	DF	RUS	Amir Mokhammad (to (Russia) Spartak Kostroma)

=== Kyzylzhar ===
In: Note: Flags indicate national team as defined under FIFA eligibility rules; some limited exceptions apply. Players may hold more than one non-FIFA nationality.

No.	Pos.	Nation	Player
14	DF	KAZ	Alikhan Serikbay (loan return from (Kazakhstan) Caspiy)
19	MF	KAZ	Dimash Serikuly (from (Kazakhstan) Kaisar)
28	DF	SRB	Slobodan Urošević (from (Serbia) TSC)
55	MF	UKR	Oleksandr Noyok (from (Kazakhstan) Kyzylzhar)
77	MF	ALB	Liridon Latifi (from (North Macedonia) Shkëndija)
96	MF	KAZ	Aybol Abiken (from (Kazakhstan) Kaisar)
—	GK	KAZ	Dulat Talyspaev (from (Denmark) HB Køge)

Out: Note: Flags indicate national team as defined under FIFA eligibility rules; some limited exceptions apply. Players may hold more than one non-FIFA nationality.

No.	Pos.	Nation	Player
5	DF	KAZ	Demiyat Slambekov (to (Kazakhstan) Irtysh Pavlodar)
19	MF	SRB	Damjan Krajišnik (to (Serbia) Radnički Niš)
21	DF	KAZ	Timur Kurbanov (to (Kazakhstan) Caspiy)
25	DF	BUL	Plamen Galabov
28	MF	KAZ	Roman Chirkov
47	FW	SEN	Honore Gomis

=== Okzhetpes ===
In: Note: Flags indicate national team as defined under FIFA eligibility rules; some limited exceptions apply. Players may hold more than one non-FIFA nationality.

No.	Pos.	Nation	Player
12	GK	KAZ	Aleksandr Dovgal (from (Russia) Volga Ulyanovsk)
17	MF	UZB	Shokhboz Umarov (from (Uzbekistan) Bunyodkor)
25	MF	BRA	Marcinho (from (Bosnia and Herzegovina) Široki Brijeg)
90	FW	BLR	Vsevolod Sadovsky

Out: Note: Flags indicate national team as defined under FIFA eligibility rules; some limited exceptions apply. Players may hold more than one non-FIFA nationality.

No.	Pos.	Nation	Player
17	MF	KAZ	Abinur Nurymbet (to (Kazakhstan) Ordabasy)

=== Ordabasy ===
In: Note: Flags indicate national team as defined under FIFA eligibility rules; some limited exceptions apply. Players may hold more than one non-FIFA nationality.

No.	Pos.	Nation	Player
4	DF	KAZ	Sergey Keiler (from (Kazakhstan) Ulytau)
23	MF	KAZ	Abinur Nurymbet (from (Kazakhstan) Okzhetpes)
28	FW	NOR	Bjørn Johnsen (from (Saudi Arabia) Al Wehda)
44	MF	FRA	Tidiane Keïta (from (Romania) CFR Cluj)

Out: Note: Flags indicate national team as defined under FIFA eligibility rules; some limited exceptions apply. Players may hold more than one non-FIFA nationality.

No.	Pos.	Nation	Player
4	DF	MDA	Victor Mudrac
7	FW	UKR	Vladyslav Naumets (to (Kazakhstan) Zhenis)
17	FW	KAZ	Zikrillo Sultaniyazov (to (Kazakhstan) Irtysh Pavlodar)
23	MF	KAZ	Murodzhon Khalmatov (on loan to (Kazakhstan) Irtysh Pavlodar)
45	FW	BUL	Dimitar Mitkov (to (Indonesia) Madura United)

=== Tobol ===
In: Note: Flags indicate national team as defined under FIFA eligibility rules; some limited exceptions apply. Players may hold more than one non-FIFA nationality.

No.	Pos.	Nation	Player
10	MF	KAZ	Islam Chesnokov (from (Scotland) Heart of Midlothian)
25	DF	CRO	Antonio Boršić (from (Croatia) NK Varaždin)
72	DF	FRA	Rayan Senhadji (from (Azerbaijan) Sumgayit)
99	FW	BLR	Vitaly Lisakovich (from (Belarus) Torpedo-BelAZ Zhodino)

Out: Note: Flags indicate national team as defined under FIFA eligibility rules; some limited exceptions apply. Players may hold more than one non-FIFA nationality.

No.	Pos.	Nation	Player
11	FW	KAZ	Damir Marat (on loan to (Kazakhstan) Astana)
26	DF	RUS	Kirill Glushchenkov (to (Belarus) Dynamo Brest)
29	MF	KAZ	Daniyar Usenov (to (Kazakhstan) Caspiy)
99	FW	ALB	Rubin Hebaj (to (Albania) AF Elbasani)

=== Ulytau ===
In: Note: Flags indicate national team as defined under FIFA eligibility rules; some limited exceptions apply. Players may hold more than one non-FIFA nationality.

No.	Pos.	Nation	Player
2	DF	ESP	David Carmona (from (Bulgaria) Montana)
13	DF	KAZ	Aslan Akhmedov (from (Kazakhstan) Shakhter Karagandy)
22	FW	BLR	Ilya Chernyak (from (Bosnia and Herzegovina) Široki Brijeg)
45	FW	KAZ	Bakdaulet Zulfikarov (from (Kazakhstan) Caspiy)

Out: Note: Flags indicate national team as defined under FIFA eligibility rules; some limited exceptions apply. Players may hold more than one non-FIFA nationality.

No.	Pos.	Nation	Player
3	DF	KAZ	Sergey Keiler (to (Kazakhstan) Ordabasy)
10	MF	KAZ	Abzal Taubay
13	DF	KAZ	Sagi Malikaydar (to (Kazakhstan) Irtysh Pavlodar)
19	FW	KAZ	Abzal Mukanbetzhanov (loan return to (Kazakhstan) Taraz)
20	MF	KAZ	Ramazan Abylaykhan (to (Kazakhstan) Caspiy)
22	MF	KAZ	Ernar Kospayev

=== Zhenis ===
In: Note: Flags indicate national team as defined under FIFA eligibility rules; some limited exceptions apply. Players may hold more than one non-FIFA nationality.

No.	Pos.	Nation	Player
3	DF	GHA	Patrick Kpozo (from (Czech Republic) Baník Ostrava)
9	FW	UKR	Vladyslav Naumets (from (Kazakhstan) Ordabasy)
11	FW	CRO	Andrija Filipović (from (Iraq) Al-Talaba)
29	MF	KAZ	Samat Zharynbetov (from (Kazakhstan) Irtysh Pavlodar)

Out: Note: Flags indicate national team as defined under FIFA eligibility rules; some limited exceptions apply. Players may hold more than one non-FIFA nationality.

No.	Pos.	Nation	Player
9	FW	GEO	Elguja Lobjanidze (to (Kazakhstan) Altai)
21	MF	KAZ	Aleksandr Merkel (to (Kazakhstan) Astana)
23	MF	KAZ	Andrey Ulshin (to (Kazakhstan) Shakhter Karagandy)
45	FW	NGA	Samson Iyede (to (Kazakhstan) Irtysh Pavlodar)

=== Zhetysu ===
In: Note: Flags indicate national team as defined under FIFA eligibility rules; some limited exceptions apply. Players may hold more than one non-FIFA nationality.

No.	Pos.	Nation	Player
18	FW	KAZ	Vyacheslav Shvyryov (from (Kazakhstan) Irtysh Pavlodar)

Out: Note: Flags indicate national team as defined under FIFA eligibility rules; some limited exceptions apply. Players may hold more than one non-FIFA nationality.

No.	Pos.	Nation	Player
14	FW	KAZ	Mansur Birkurmanov (loan return to (Kazakhstan) Kairat-Zhastar)
19	FW	MNE	Mladen Kovačević (to (Montenegro) Jedinstvo Bijelo Polje)
57	MF	KAZ	Miras Umaniyazov (loan return to (Kazakhstan) Aktobe)
