= 2026 Kazakhstan Cup =

Tournament details
- Country: Kazakhstan
- Teams: 32

Final positions
- Champions: FC Ordabasy
- Runners-up: FC Kaisar

Tournament statistics
- Matches played: 27
- Goals scored: 91 (3.37 per match)
- All statistics correct as of 13 May 2026.

The 2026 Kazakhstan Cup (known as the Fonbet Kazakhstan Cup for sponsorship reasons) was the 34th season of the Kazakhstan Cup, the annual nationwide football cup competition of Kazakhstan since the independence of the country. Tobol were the defending champions. Ordabasy were crowned champions on 7 November, defeating Kaisar in the final.

== Participating clubs ==
The following teams entered the competition:

Kazakhstan Premier League all 16 clubs of the 2026 season	Kazakhstan First League; 8 clubs of the 2026 season	Kazakhstan Second League; 8 clubs of the 2026 season
Aktobe; Altai; Astana; Atyrau; Caspiy; Irtysh Pavlodar; Kairat; Kaisar; Kyzylzhar; Okzhetpes; Ordabasy; Tobol; Ulytau; Yelimay; Zhenis; Zhetysu	Akademiya Ontustik; Arys; Batyr; Jaiyq; Khan-Tengri; Shakhter Karagandy; Taraz; Turan	Ansat; BKS; Hromtau; Jelaev Nan; Karshiga; SD Family; Zhas Kyran; Talas

=== Format and schedule ===
Round	Clubs remaining	Clubs involved	First match date
Round of 32	32	32	8 April 2026
Round of 16	16	16	29 April 2026
Quarter-finals	8	8	
Semi-finals	4	4	
Final	2	2	

== First round ==
8 April 2026	SD Family	w/o	Irtysh Pavlodar
14:00 (UTC+5)

8 April 2026	Zhas Kyran	0–4	Atyrau	Almaty
14:00 (UTC+5)	Zhangazy (yellow card) 30'; Boranaliev (yellow card) 53'	Report	Khvalko 5'; Boranaliev 55' (o.g.); Trufanov 57', 86'	Stadium: Zhas Kyran Stadium; Attendance: 500; Referee: Maral Abdikerov

8 April 2026	Talas	0–2	Kaisar	Karatau
14:00 (UTC+5)	Kumisbek (yellow card) 16'; Nurlybay (yellow card) 20'; Tursynbaev (yellow card) 28'	Report	Zhumat 18'; Sovet 20'	Stadium: Talas Stadium; Attendance: 500; Referee: Nursultan Alibeykov

8 April 2026	Ansat	0–8	Tobol	Aksu
14:00 (UTC+5)		Report	Zuyev 2'; Hebaj 7', 24'; Zhumashev 10'; Usenov 35'; Guerra 51', 85'; Milovanović 62'	Stadium: Dostyk Stadium; Attendance: 300; Referee: Murodbek Khalilov

8 April 2026	Akademiya Ontustik	2–4	Ordabasy	Shymkent
15:00 (UTC+5)	Khaldar 27' (yellow card) 38'; Temirbek (yellow card) 39'; Mitkov 55' (o.g.)	Report	Toktybay (yellow card) 2'; Naumets 12'; Amir 45', 88'; Tolepbergen (yellow card) 45+1'; E.Astanov (yellow card) 54' (goal) 71'; Abagna (yellow card) 86'	Stadium: Namys Stadium; Attendance: 3,000; Referee: Stanislav Puchkov

8 April 2026	BKS Almaty	1–2	Astana	Almaty
15:00 (UTC+5)	Parkhatzhan 30'	Report	Mustafin 34'; Taushev (red card) 37'; Akhmetov 90+2'	Stadium: Khan Tengri Stadium; Attendance: 1,500; Referee: Amankeldin Bekarys

8 April 2026	Jaiyq	1–3	Kairat	Oral
15:00 (UTC+6)	Mukhametzhanov 26' (yellow card) 39'; Abdrakhmanov (yellow card) 33'; Umbetov (yellow card) 77'	Report	Tuyakbayev 36', 51'; Petrik 73'	Stadium: Petr Atoyan Stadium; Attendance: 8,800; Referee: Eldos Kanaev

8 April 2026	Turan	1–4	Yelimay	Turkistan
18:00 (UTC+5)	Oralbai (yellow card) 1'; Saidov 59'; Sultanov (yellow card) 69'; Duysenbekuly (yellow card) 71'; Satyshev (yellow card) 83'; Mukhametzhanov (yellow card) 90'	Report	Zhumakhanov 8'; Murtazayev 28' (yellow card) 58'; Tyulyubay (yellow card) 38'; Sviridov 74', 76'; Belančić (yellow card) 86'	Stadium: Turkistan Arena; Attendance: 4,500; Referee: Sergey Popov

8 April 2026	Karshiga	0–1	Zhetysu	Almaty
19:00 (UTC+5)	Litvinenko (yellow card) 54'; Glushkov (yellow card) 90'	Report	Birkurmanov 45'; Nurbol (yellow card) 63'	Attendance: 400; Referee: Nurzhan Zhumashev

9 April 2026	Hromtau	1–4	Zhenis	Khromtau
14:00 (UTC+5)	Urda 76'	Report	Santana 65'; Adílio 69'; Lobjanidze 71', 90'; Gian (yellow card) 90+2'; Kashkankul (yellow card) 90+3'	Stadium: Khromtau Stadium; Attendance: 1,200; Referee: Nikolai Dyshkant

9 April 2026	Jelaev Nan	0–2	Altai
14:00 (UTC+5)	Amankosov (yellow card) 8'; Sultantemirov (yellow card) 52'; Urda 76'; Ayip-Nurtas (yellow card) 90'	Report	Mićević 15'; Schmidt 54'; Gorshunov (yellow card) 59'; Zhanuzakov (yellow card) 81'	Attendance: 1,000; Referee: Zhaksylyk Seydakhmetov

9 April 2026	Arys	0–4	Aktobe
15:00 (UTC+5)	Kuatbekuly (yellow card) 32'	Report	Shushenachev 27'; Yerlanov 37'; Kuatbekuly 42'; Baidauletov (yellow card) 66'; Zelkovich 81'	Attendance: 1,500; Referee: Anuar Kazbekov

9 April 2026	Taraz	0–1 (a.e.t.)	Ulytau	Taraz
15:00 (UTC+5)	Torebek (yellow card) 12'; Rzatayev (yellow card) 90+3'	Report	Nurali (yellow card) 16'; Daniyarov (yellow card) 74'; Harada 106'; Smith (yellow card) 120+1'	Stadium: Central Stadium; Attendance: 3,100; Referee: Birzhan Serzhanuly

9 April 2026	Batyr	0–4	Caspiy	Ekıbastūz
15:00 (UTC+5)	Samoilov (yellow card) 90+2'	Report	Elemes (yellow card) 5'; Zulfikarov 47'; Petrovic 74'; Esimbekov (yellow card) 79'; Umayev 90'; Zhazmaganbetov 90+3'	Stadium: Shakhter Stadium; Attendance: 200; Referee: Kirill Tkachev

9 April 2026	Shakhter Karagandy	2–3	Okzhetpes	Karaganda
15:00 (UTC+5)	Litosh 9', 45' (yellow card) 57'; Kholod (yellow card) 79'	Report	Nurgaliyev (yellow card) 8' (goal) 52'; Yensebayev (yellow card) 43'; Buribaev 71'; Vasiljev 85'	Stadium: Shakhter Stadium; Attendance: 1,500; Referee: Sagadat Ydyrysov

9 April 2026	Khan-Tengri	0–1	Kyzylzhar	Almaty
16:00 (UTC+5)	Emirov (red card) 33'; Medelkhan (yellow card) 53'; Kusaynov (yellow card) 61'; Zakharchenko (yellow card) 81'; Amirseitov (yellow card) 83'	Report	Kozlenko (yellow card) 41'; Beugre 45'; Sokolenko (yellow card) 83'; Krajišnik (yellow card) 86'	Stadium: Khan Tengri Stadium; Attendance: 200; Referee: Mikhail Bildinov

== Second round ==
On 9 April, the Kazakhstan Football Federation announced the draw for the second round of the cup.

29 April 2026	Okzhetpes	2–3	Zhenis	Kokshetau
14:00 (UTC+5)	Abdumannonov 20'; Sovpel (yellow card) 27'; Vasiljev (yellow card) 44'; Buribaev (yellow card) 86'; Zhangylyshbay 90+4'	Report	Ulshin 14' (yellow card) 67'; Tursynbay 65'; Imnadze (yellow card) 80'; Santana 83'	Stadium: Okzhetpes Stadium; Attendance: 5,000

29 April 2026	Irtysh Pavlodar	1–2	Kyzylzhar	Pavlodar
15:00 (UTC+5)	Turlybek 30'; Khadarkevich (yellow card) 38'; Ibrahim (yellow card) 58'	Report	Pertsukh (yellow card) 13'; Slambekov 23'; Galabov 59'; Krajišnik (yellow card) 76'; Petrov (yellow card) 90+3'	Stadium: Central Stadium; Attendance: 2,200; Referee: Alexander Zatula

29 April 2026	Atyrau	0–2	Zhetysu	Atyrau
16:00 (UTC+5)	Tkachenko (yellow card) 5'; Noyok (yellow card) 66'	Report	Baltabekov (yellow card) 20'; Zivanovic (yellow card) 42'; Kashken (yellow card) 45+1'; Birkurmanov 48'; Jovanović 55'; Abzalov (yellow card) 71'	Stadium: Munaishy Stadium; Attendance: 200; Referee: Marat Iskakov

29 April 2026	Astana	1–2	Tobol	Astana
18:00 (UTC+5)	Abdurasulov (yellow card) 36'; Karaman (yellow card) 53'; Anuarov 80'	Report	Bakitzhanov (yellow card) 6'; Talal 7'; Usenov (yellow card) 42' (yellow-red card) 45+2'; Zhumashev 87' (pen.)	Stadium: Astana Arena; Attendance: 4,000; Referee: Denis Tevyashov

29 April 2026	Kaisar	2–1	Kairat	Kyzylorda
20:00 (UTC+5)	Kaldybekov 4'; Tolegenov (yellow card) 52'; Tazhibay 61'; Askarov (yellow card) 90+5'	Report	Duysenbek (yellow card) 28'; Bazarbaev (yellow card) 60'; Bagdat (yellow card) 68'; Kurgin (yellow card) 86'; Bekbolat (yellow card) 90+2'; Tuyakbaev 90+3'	Stadium: Gani Muratbayev Stadium; Attendance: 11,000; Referee: Georgy Chekhovsky

30 April 2026	Altai	4–3 (a.e.t.)	Ulytau	Almaty
12:00 (UTC+5)	Kukeev (yellow card) 35'; Gorshunov 54', 64'; Redzhepov (yellow card) 69'; Jambor (yellow card) 90+2' (goal) 119'; Saylybaev 111'	Report	Abylaykhan 12'; Chalkin 83'; Kishi 95' (red card) 104'; Afanasenko (yellow card) 110'	Stadium: Khan Tengri Stadium; Attendance: 200; Referee: Aydin Tasybaev

30 April 2026	Aktobe	2–1	Yelimay	Aktobe
19:00 (UTC+5)	Korzun (yellow card) 25'; Seydakhmet (yellow card) 27'; Zhukov (yellow card) 45+3'; Nani 59', 83'; Tanzharikov (yellow card) 70'; Yerlanov (yellow card) 90+5'	Report	Ilić (yellow card) 31'; Belančić (yellow card) 63' (yellow-red card) 86'; Payruz (yellow card) 70'; Orazov (yellow card) 73' (goal) 90+4'	Stadium: Central Stadium; Attendance: 12,400; Referee: Danil Gorda

30 April 2026	Ordabasy	3–0	Caspiy	Shymkent
20:00 (UTC+5)	Amir (yellow card) 56'; Mitkov 17', 66', 88'; Natel (yellow card) 81'	Report	Kadyrbaev (yellow card) 34'; Aripov (yellow card) 39' (yellow-red card) 64'; Nabikhanov (yellow card) 50'; Kuanysh (yellow card) 83'	Stadium: Kazhymukan Munaitpasov Stadium; Attendance: 7,548; Referee: Bagdat Abdullaev

== Quarter-finals ==
13 May 2026	Aktobe	1–1 (a.e.t.) (3–4 p)	Altai	Aktobe
19:00 (UTC+5)	Zeljković 13'; Pibe (yellow card) 35'; Shushenachev (yellow card) 81'; Ordets (yellow card) 89'; Baydavletov (yellow card) 109'; Zarutsky (yellow card) 120+2'	Report	Redzhepov (yellow card) 24' (goal) 28'; Schmidt (yellow card) 36'; Mitrofanov (yellow card) 62'; Konovalov (yellow card) 128'	Stadium: Central Stadium; Attendance: 12,400; Referee: Sergey Nozhenko
	Penalties
	Álvarez (penalty missed); Ordets (penalty scored); Shushenachev (penalty scored); Yerlanov (penalty scored); Dosmagambetov (penalty scored)		(penalty scored) Dadaev; (penalty scored) Stoisavljević; (penalty missed) Popov; (penalty scored) Odeyobo; (penalty scored) Mićević

13 May 2026	Zhenis	2–0	Kyzylzhar	Astana
19:00 (UTC+5)	Santana 19'; Adílio 22'; Askarov (yellow card) 32'; Saulet (yellow card) 60'; Khaseyn (yellow card) 75'; Adilov (yellow card) 86'	Report	Slambekov (yellow card) 65'	Stadium: Astana Arena; Attendance: 3,000; Referee: Bulat Sariev

13 May 2026	Kaisar	1–1 (a.e.t.) (5–3 p)	Tobol	Kyzylorda
20:00 (UTC+5)	Tolegenov (yellow card) 19'; Sovet (yellow card) 22'; Konlimkos 33'; Cuckić (yellow card) 75'	Report	Marat (yellow card) 15'; Zhumat 78'; Zhagorov (yellow card) 80'; Kalmyrza (yellow card) 99'; Tagybergen (yellow card) 105'; Cissé (yellow card) 114'	Stadium: Gani Muratbayev Stadium; Attendance: 9,127; Referee: Ruslan Sultangaliev
	Penalties
	Abiken (penalty scored); Kaldybekov (penalty scored); Zhumabekov (penalty scored); Askarov (penalty scored); Idrisov (penalty scored)		(penalty scored) Zhumashev; (penalty missed) Zhumat; (penalty scored) Guerra; (penalty scored) Asrankulov

13 May 2026	Ordabasy	1–0	Zhetysu	Shymkent
20:00 (UTC+5)	Toktybay (yellow card) 45'; Abagna 48'; Amanović (yellow card) 86'; Tolepbergen (yellow card) 88'; Căpățînă (yellow card) 90'	Report	Kashken (yellow card) 36'; Mosiashvili (yellow card) 77'; Anuarbekov (yellow card) 86'	Stadium: Kazhymukan Munaitpasov Stadium; Attendance: 8,719; Referee: Sayat Karabaev

== Semi-finals ==
15 July 2026	Ordabasy	3–1	Altai	Shymkent
20:00 (UTC+5)	Léo Natel 22'; Yuriy Vakulko (yellow card) 34'; Bjørn Maars Johnsen 38'; Guy Kilama 53'; Zhaksybaev (yellow card) 80'	Report	Mitrofanov (yellow card) 20'; Dmitry Podstrelov 90+1'; Aliakbar (red card) 90+5'	Stadium: Kazhymukan Munaitpasov Stadium; Attendance: 8,342; Referee: Danil Gorda

19 August 2026	Altai	1–2	Ordabasy	Oskemen
18:00 (UTC+5)	Dodev 3' (yellow card) 54'; Samuel Odeyobo (yellow card) 31'; Nemanja Mićević (yellow card) 51'; Nikola Jambor (yellow card) 52'; Nazymkhanov (yellow card) 60'; Kukeev (yellow card) 74'; Kan (yellow card) 77'	Report	Bjørn Maars Johnsen 11'; Amir 28' (yellow card) 54'; Nikola Antić (yellow card) 32'; Elkhan Astanov (yellow card) 51'; Serhiy Malyi (yellow card) 51'; Yuriy Vakulko (yellow card) 53'; Aleksa Amanović (yellow card) 68'	Stadium: Vostok Stadium; Attendance: 4,000; Referee: Ruslan Sultangaliev

Ordabasy won 5–2 on aggregate

29 July 2026	Kaisar	3–1	Zhenis	Kyzylorda
20:00 (UTC+5)	Zhaksylyk 4', 46' (yellow card) 53'; Nikola Cuckić (yellow card) 25'; Stefan Bukorac (yellow card) 40'; Victor Moses 45'; Klaidher (yellow card) 65'; Agostinho (yellow card) 90+7'	Report	Andrija Filipović 8'; Patrick Kpozo (yellow card) 14' (yellow-red card) 89'	Stadium: Gani Muratbayev Stadium; Attendance: 11,000; Referee: Bagdat Abdullaev

19 August 2026	Zhenis	3–2	Kaisar	Astana
19:00 (UTC+5)	Tevzadze (yellow card) 2' (yellow-red card) 27'; Gian 18'; Andrija Filipović 25', 75'; Adílio (yellow card) 67'; Madelkhan (yellow card) 87'; Élder Santana (yellow card) 90+3'	Report	Sovet (yellow card) 23'; Stefan Bukorac (yellow card) 33'; Victor Moses (yellow card) 42'; Kaldybekov (yellow card) 45+4'; Miquéias 69'; Askarov (yellow card) 74'; Idrisov (yellow card) 77'; Bagdat 90'	Stadium: Astana Arena; Attendance: 4,000; Referee: Anton Kuchma

Kaisar won 5–4 on aggregate

== Final ==
7 November 2026	Ordabasy	4–1	Kaisar	Turkistan
16:00 (UTC+5)	S. Astanov 7'; Johnsen 41'; Abagna 60'; E. Astanov 71'	Report	Agostinho 85'	Stadium: Turkistan Arena; Attendance: 7,000; Referee: Bulat Sariev

== Goal scorers ==
As of match played 13 May 2026

3 goals:

- (Bulgaria) Dimitar Mitkov - Ordabasy
- (Brazil) Élder Santana - Zhenis

2 goals:

- (Portugal) Nani - Aktobe
- (Kazakhstan) Elisey Gorshunov - Altai
- (Kazakhstan) Yan Trufanov - Atyrau
- (Kazakhstan) Azamat Tuyakbayev - Kairat
- (Kazakhstan) Zhasulan Amir - Ordabasy
- (Kazakhstan) Artem Litosh - Shakhter Karagandy
- (Albania) Rubin Hebaj - Tobol
- (Kazakhstan) Zhaslan Zhumashev - Tobol
- (Venezuela) Luis Guerra - Tobol
- (Kazakhstan) Ivan Sviridov - Yelimay
- (Brazil) Adílio - Zhenis
- (Georgia (country)) Elguja Lobjanidze - Zhenis
- (Kazakhstan) Mansur Birkurmanov - Zhetysu

1 goals:

- (Kazakhstan) Alibek Khaldar - Akademiya Ontustik
- (Kazakhstan) Muslim Zhumat - Akademiya Ontustik
- (Kazakhstan) Kazhymukan Kuatbekuly - Aktobe
- (Kazakhstan) Artur Shushenachev - Aktobe
- (Kazakhstan) Temirlan Yerlanov - Aktobe
- (Sweden) Ajdin Zeljković - Aktobe
- (Kazakhstan) Aydin Zelkovich - Aktobe
- (Croatia) Nikola Jambor - Altai
- (Kazakhstan) Timur Redzhepov - Altai
- (Kazakhstan) Oraz Saylybaev - Altai
- (Kazakhstan) Dmitriy Schmidt - Altai
- (Serbia) Nemanja Mićević - Altai
- (Kazakhstan) Arsen Akhmetov - Astana
- (Kazakhstan) Sanzhar Anuarov - Astana
- (Kazakhstan) Batyrkhan Mustafin - Astana
- (Belarus) Yegor Khvalko - Atyrau
- (Kazakhstan) Dias Parkhatzhan - BKS Almaty
- (Croatia) Bogdan Petrovic - Caspiy
- (Kazakhstan) Zhaner Zhazmaganbetov - Caspiy
- (Kazakhstan) Bakdaulet Zulfikarov - Caspiy
- (Russia) Idris Umayev - Caspiy
- (Kazakhstan) Daniyar Urda - Hromtau
- (Kazakhstan) Miras Turlybek - Irtysh Pavlodar
- (Kazakhstan) Timur Mukhametzhanov - Jaiyq
- (Kazakhstan) Evgeniy Petrik - Kairat
- (Kazakhstan) Sagi Sovet - Kaisar
- (Kazakhstan) Azamat Tuyakbaev - Kairat
- (Kazakhstan) Ersultan Kaldybekov - Kaisar
- (Kazakhstan) Bakdaulet Konlimkos - Kaisar
- (Kazakhstan) Batyrkhan Tazhibay - Kaisar
- (Kazakhstan) Muslim Zhumat - Kaisar
- (Bulgaria) Plamen Galabov - Kyzylzhar
- (Ivory Coast) Etienne Beugre - Kyzylzhar
- (Kazakhstan) Demiyat Slambekov - Kyzylzhar
- (Ghana) David Abagna - Ordabasy
- (Kazakhstan) Elkhan Astanov - Ordabasy
- (Ukraine) Vladyslav Naumets - Ordabasy
- (Kazakhstan) Bektemir Abdumannonov - Okzhetpes
- (Kazakhstan) Yerkebulan Nurgaliyev - Okzhetpes
- (Kazakhstan) Nurgaini Buribaev - Okzhetpes
- (Kazakhstan) Vladislav Vasiljev - Okzhetpes
- (Kazakhstan) Toktar Zhangylyshbay - Okzhetpes
- (Kazakhstan) Daniyar Usenov - Tobol
- (Kazakhstan) Dauren Zhumat - Tobol
- (Kazakhstan) Aleksandr Zuyev - Tobol
- (Morocco) Amine Talal - Tobol
- (Serbia) Uroš Milovanović - Tobol
- (Kazakhstan) Elkhan Saidov - Turan
- (Japan) Hiroki Harada - Ulytau
- (Japan) Kotaro Kishi - Ulytau
- (Kazakhstan) Ramazan Abylaykhan - Ulytau
- (Kazakhstan) Maksim Chalkin - Ulytau
- (Kazakhstan) Roman Murtazayev - Yelimay
- (Kazakhstan) Ramazan Orazov - Yelimay
- (Kazakhstan) Adilbek Zhumakhanov - Yelimay
- (Kazakhstan) Sagadat Tursynbay - Zhenis
- (Kazakhstan) Andrey Ulshin - Zhenis
- (Serbia) Strahinja Jovanović - Zhetysu

Own goal

- (Kazakhstan) Aset Boranaliev - Zhas Kyran vs Atyrau 8 April 2026
- (Bulgaria) Dimitar Mitkov - Akademiya Ontustik vs Ordabasy 8 April 2026
