= 2025 FC Ordabasy season =

FC Ordabasy
2025 season
- Chairman: Askhat Seisembek
- Manager: Andrei Martin
- Stadium: Kazhymukan Munaitpasov Stadium
- Premier League: 7th
- Kazakhstan Cup: Runners-Up
- Conference League: First qualifying round vs Torpedo Kutaisi
- Top goalscorer: League: Everton Moraes (6); Elkhan Astanov (6); All: Everton Moraes (7)
- Highest home attendance: 17,200 vs Torpedo Kutaisi (17 July 2025)
- Lowest home attendance: 1,900 vs Zhetysu (19 April 2025)
- Average home league attendance: 5,268 (19 October 2025)
Home colours	Away colours

The 2025 FC Ordabasy season was the 23rd successive season that Ordabasy will play in the Kazakhstan Premier League, the highest tier of association football in Kazakhstan.

== Season events ==
On 20 December 2024, Ordabasy announced that Kirill Keker had left the club after his contract had expired, with Andrei Martin being appointed as the clubs new Head Coach on 22 December 2024.

On 24 June, Ordabasy announced the signing of Yuriy Vakulko from Kryvbas Kryvyi Rih.

On 28 June, Ordabasy announced the signing of Vladyslav Naumets from LNZ Cherkasy.

On 30 June, Ordabasy announced the signing of Mihai Căpățînă from Universitatea Craiova.

On 2 July, Ordabasy announced the signing of Abylaykhan Zhumabek from Turan.

On 31 July, Ordabasy announced the signing of Alan Dias after he'd left Sumgayit.

== Squad ==
As of match played 26 October 2025

No.	Name	Nationality	Position	Date of birth (age)	Signed from	Signed in	Contract ends	Apps.	Goals
Goalkeepers
1	Bekkhan Shayzada	(Kazakhstan)	GK	28 February 1998 (aged 27)	Youth Team	2016		128	0
34	Dumitru Celeadnic	(Moldova)	GK	28 February 1998 (aged 27)	Sheriff Tiraspol	2025		10	0
99	Aydos Kemaladin	(Kazakhstan)	GK	8 January 2005 (aged 20)	Academy	2024		3	0
Defenders
3	Alan Dias	(Brazil)	DF	5 September 1998 (aged 27)	Unattached	2025		3	0
4	Victor Mudrac	(Moldova)	DF	3 March 1994 (aged 31)	Petrocub Hîncești	2025		11	1
5	Nikola Antić	(Serbia)	DF	4 January 1994 (aged 31)	Partizan	2025		28	1
6	Ular Zhaksybaev	(Kazakhstan)	DF	20 October 1994 (aged 31)	Kyzylzhar	2025		47	1
13	Sagadat Tursynbay	(Kazakhstan)	DF	26 March 1999 (aged 26)	Youth Team	2018		91	7
22	Sultanbek Astanov	(Kazakhstan)	DF	23 March 1999 (aged 26)	Kairat	2023		90	6
25	Serhiy Malyi	(Kazakhstan)	DF	5 June 1990 (aged 35)	Tobol	2023		148	15
47	Zhasulan Amir	(Kazakhstan)	DF	26 December 2006 (aged 18)	Academy	2025		15	0
Midfielders
7	Luka Imnadze	(Georgia (country))	MF	26 August 1997 (aged 28)	Kyzylzhar	2025		33	4
8	Yuriy Vakulko	(Ukraine)	MF	10 November 1997 (aged 28)	Kryvbas Kryvyi Rih	2025		17	0
11	Yerkebulan Tungyshbayev	(Kazakhstan)	MF	14 January 1995 (aged 30)	Aksu	2023		248	33
16	Mihai Căpățînă	(Romania)	MF	16 December 1995 (aged 29)	Universitatea Craiova	2025		17	1
17	Zikrillo Sultaniyazov	(Kazakhstan)	MF	15 October 2003 (aged 22)	Academy	2021		34	2
20	Elkhan Astanov	(Kazakhstan)	MF	21 May 2000 (aged 25)	on loan from Astana	2025		91	17
23	Murojon Khalmatov	(Kazakhstan)	MF	20 July 2003 (aged 22)	Kairat Academy	2021		55	6
27	Dario Čanađija	(Croatia)	MF	17 April 1994 (aged 31)	Gloria Buzău	2025		23	1
30	Vladyslav Naumets	(Ukraine)	MF	7 March 1999 (aged 26)	LNZ Cherkasy	2025		16	1
98	João Paulino	(Cape Verde)	MF	26 May 1998 (aged 27)	on loan from Zimbru Chișinău	2025		22	3
Forwards
9	Everton Moraes	(Brazil)	FW	12 May 2002 (aged 23)	Bahia	2025		31	7
10	Abylaykhan Zhumabek	(Kazakhstan)	FW	19 October 2001 (aged 24)	Turan	2025		11	1
29	Bagdaulet Nuraly	(Kazakhstan)	FW	6 February 2007 (aged 18)	Academy	2025		10	0
88	Alibek Khaldar	(Kazakhstan)	FW	2 May 2006 (aged 19)	Academy	2025		2	0
Players away on loan
Players that left during the season
8	Askhat Tagybergen	(Kazakhstan)	MF	9 August 1990 (aged 35)	Tobol	2023		66	15
10	Vyacheslav Shvyryov	(Kazakhstan)	FW	7 January 2001 (aged 24)	Kairat	2025		7	0
14	Sherif Jimoh	(Ivory Coast)	DF	4 May 1996 (aged 29)	BATE Borisov	2025		20	1
18	Rashid Abubakar	(Ghana)	MF	16 March 2000 (aged 25)	Spartanii Sportul	2025		11	0
77	Kayode Saliman	(Nigeria)	FW	7 January 2003 (aged 22)	on loan from Železiarne Podbrezová	2025		9	0

== Transfers ==
=== In ===
Date	Position	Nationality	Name	From	Fee	Ref.
10 January 2025	FW	(Kazakhstan)	Vyacheslav Shvyryov	Kairat	Undisclosed	
16 January 2025	DF	(Kazakhstan)	Ular Zhaksybaev	Kyzylzhar	Undisclosed	
17 January 2025	DF	(Moldova)	Victor Mudrac	Petrocub Hîncești	Undisclosed	
19 January 2025	GK	(Moldova)	Dumitru Celeadnic	Sheriff Tiraspol	Undisclosed	
21 January 2025	MF	(Georgia (country))	Luka Imnadze	Kyzylzhar	Undisclosed	
23 January 2025	MF	(Ghana)	Rashid Abubakar	Bahia	Undisclosed	
5 February 2025	DF	(Ivory Coast)	Sherif Jimoh	BATE Borisov	Undisclosed	
8 February 2025	DF	(Serbia)	Nikola Antić	Partizan	Undisclosed	
9 February 2025	FW	(Brazil)	Everton Moraes	Spartanii Sportul	Undisclosed	
24 February 2025	MF	(Croatia)	Dario Čanađija	Gloria Buzău	Undisclosed	
24 June 2025	MF	(Ukraine)	Yuriy Vakulko	Kryvbas Kryvyi Rih	Undisclosed	
28 June 2025	MF	(Ukraine)	Vladyslav Naumets	LNZ Cherkasy	Undisclosed	
30 June 2025	MF	(Romania)	Mihai Căpățînă	Universitatea Craiova	Undisclosed	
2 July 2025	FW	(Kazakhstan)	Abylaykhan Zhumabek	Turan	Undisclosed	
31 July 2025	DF	(Brazil)	Alan Dias	Unattached	Free	

=== Loans in ===
Date from	Position	Nationality	Name	From	Date to	Ref.
10 February 2025	FW	(Nigeria)	Kayode Saliman	Železiarne Podbrezová	1 July 2025	
11 March 2025	MF	(Cape Verde)	João Paulino	Zimbru Chișinău	End of season	

=== Released ===
Date	Position	Nationality	Name	Joined	Date	Ref.
12 January 2025	MF	(Uzbekistan)	Shokhboz Umarov	Turan	28 February 2025	
16 January 2025	DF	(Kazakhstan)	Gafurzhan Suyumbayev	Irtysh Pavlodar		
4 February 2025	GK	(Kazakhstan)	Azamat Zhomartov	Jetisay		
4 February 2025	MF	(Kazakhstan)	Bauyrzhan Islamkhan	Turan	28 February 2025	
29 March 2025	MF	(Kazakhstan)	Askhat Tagybergen	Tobol		
1 July 2025	MF	(Ghana)	Rashid Abubakar	Atyrau		
28 July 2025	DF	(Ivory Coast)	Sherif Jimoh			

== Friendlies ==
23 January 2025	Ordabasy	0-3	CSKA Moscow	Abu Dhabi, United Arab Emirates
12:00 (UTC+5)	Malyi (yellow card) 83'	Report	Oblyakov 6'; Glebov 32'; Koïta 45'

16 February 2025	Iberia 1999	0–1	Ordabasy	Abu Dhabi, United Arab Emirates
18:30 (UTC+5)		Report	Astanov 49'

20 February 2025	Gareji Sagarejo	3–1	Ordabasy	Abu Dhabi, United Arab Emirates
19:00 (UTC+5)	Gogoberishvili 6'; Papava 38'; Gabadze 89'	Report	Mudrac 45+4'

== Competitions ==
=== Overview ===
Competition	First match	Last match	Starting round	Final position	Record							
Competition	First match	Last match	Starting round	Final position	Pld	W	D	L	GF	GA	GD	Win %
Premier League	1 March 2025	26 October 2025	Matchday 1	7th	26	9	8	9	37	28	+9	34.62
Kazakhstan Cup	13 April 2025	4 October 2025	Round of 16	Runnersup	5	3	1	1	4	2	+2	60.00
UEFA Conference League	10 July 2025	17 July 2025	First qualifying round	First qualifying round	2	0	1	1	4	5	−1	0.00
Total					33	12	10	11	45	35	+10	36.36

Last updated: 26 October 2025
Source: Competitions

=== Premier League ===
==== Results summary ====
Overall								Home						Away					
Pld	W	D	L	GF	GA	GD	Pts	W	D	L	GF	GA	GD	W	D	L	GF	GA	GD
26	9	8	9	38	27	+11	35	6	4	3	22	10	+12	3	4	6	16	17	−1

Last updated: 26 October 2025.
Source: See Results

==== Results by round ====
Round	1	2	3	4	5	6	7	8	10	11	12	13	14	15	16	17	18	19	20	21	22	23	9	24	25	26
Ground	H	A	H	A	H	H	A	H	H	A	H	A	H	A	H	A	H	H	A	H	A	H	A	A	H	A
Result	D	L	D	L	W	W	W	W	L	D	D	W	L	D	W	L	W	D	D	L	L	W	L	L	W	D
Position	11	14	14	13	9	8	7	6	6	7	7	7	7	7	7	7	7	7	8	7	7	8	8	8	7	7

Source: See Results
A = Away; H = Home; W = Win; D = Draw; L = Loss; P = Bye

==== Results ====
1 March 2025 1	Ordabasy	0–0	Aktobe	Shymkent
16:00 (UTC+5)		Report	Skvortsov (yellow card) 28'; Góndola (yellow card) 29'; Ivković (yellow card) 72'; Seydakhmet (yellow card) 82'	Stadium: Kazhymukan Munaitpasov Stadium; Attendance: 7,000; Referee: Rustam Omarov

8 March 2025 2	Kairat	4–0	Ordabasy	Almaty
18:00 (UTC+5)	Zaria 9', 45+2' (pen.); Glazer (yellow card) 22'; João Paulo 38'; Stanojev 73'	Report	Saliman (yellow card) 78'; Shvyryov (red card) 85'	Stadium: Central Stadium; Attendance: 6,899; Referee: Daniyar Sakhi

30 March 2025 3	Ordabasy	0–0	Kyzylzhar	Shymkent
17:00 (UTC+5)	Čanađija (yellow card) 56'; Amir (yellow card) 83'; Sultaniyazov (yellow card) 90+5'; Zhaksybaev (yellow card) 90+5'	Report	Martinović (yellow card) 80'; Zorić (yellow card) 90+5'	Stadium: Kazhymukan Munaitpasov Stadium; Attendance: 3,000; Referee: Baghdad Abdullayev

5 April 2025 4	Astana	2–1	Ordabasy	Astana
19:00 (UTC+5)	Camara 33', 58'; Amanović (yellow card) 39'; Ebong (yellow card) 90+2'	Report	S.Astanov 40'; Khalmatov (yellow card) 73'; Antić (yellow card) 90+3'	Stadium: Astana Arena; Attendance: 10,052; Referee: Saken Baimbet

19 April 2025 5	Ordabasy	1–0	Zhetysu	Shymkent
17:00 (UTC+5)	Khalmatov (yellow card) 21'; Everton 45+2'; Zhaksybaev (yellow card) 60'; Shvyryov (yellow card) 84'	Report	Takulov (yellow card) 33'; Taykenov (yellow card) 65'; Karimov (yellow card) 89'	Stadium: Kazhymukan Munaitpasov Stadium; Attendance: 1,900; Referee: Arman Ismuratov

27 April 2025 6	Ordabasy	1–0	Turan	Shymkent
19:00 (UTC+5)	Everton 44'; Sultaniyazov (yellow card) 63'	Report	Zhumabek (penalty missed) 44'; Askarov (yellow card) 90+1'	Stadium: Kazhymukan Munaitpasov Stadium; Attendance: 2,000; Referee: Saken Bayimbet

3 May 2025 7	Atyrau	1–2	Ordabasy	Atyrau
16:00 (UTC+5)	Kaldybekov (yellow card) 12'; Chaduneli (yellow card) 24'; Chunchukov (yellow card) 84'; Chirkov (yellow card) 88' (red card) 90+4'; Sapanov 90'	Report	Malyi 37'; S.Astanov 52'; Imnadze (yellow card) 66'; Zhaksybaev (yellow card) 83'; Amir (yellow card) 87'	Stadium: Munaishy Stadium; Attendance: 3,500; Referee: Aleksandr Zatula

11 May 2025 8	Ordabasy	5–0	Kaisar	Shymkent
17:00 (UTC+5)	Malyi (yellow card) 9' (goal) 90+3'; Everton 18'; Sultanov 33' (o.g.); Antić (yellow card) 64'; Mudrac 76' (pen.); Tungyshbayev 83'	Report	Zhalmukan (yellow card) 10'; Narzildayev (yellow card) 37'	Stadium: Kazhymukan Munaitpasov Stadium; Attendance: 8,500; Referee: Sayat Karabaev

24 May 2025 10	Ordabasy	0–1	Ulytau	Shymkent
19:30 (UTC+5)	Malyi (yellow card) 41'; Jimoh (yellow card) 63'; S.Astanov (yellow card) 68'; Khalmatov (yellow card) 78'; Sultaniyazov (yellow card) 90+3'	Report	Moldakarayev 45+2' (pen.)	Stadium: Kazhymukan Munaitpasov Stadium; Attendance: 9,000; Referee: Anton Kuchma

30 May 2025 11	Jenis	2–2	Ordabasy	Astana
18:00 (UTC+5)	Anuarbekov 3'; Adil 38'; Adílio (yellow card) 54'; Sovet (yellow card) 65' (red card) 67'; Karaman (yellow card) 74'; Kuat (yellow card) 87'	Report	S.Astanov (yellow card) 22'; Zhaksybaev (yellow card) 56' (yellow-red card) 62'; Malyi 71'; Sultaniyazov 90'	Stadium: Astana Arena; Attendance: 2,500; Referee: Sanzhar Iskakov

15 June 2025 12	Ordabasy	1–1	Elimai	Shymkent
20:00 (UTC+5)	Malyi (yellow card) 45'; Khalmatov (yellow card) 45+4' (goal) 85'; Abubakar (yellow card) 90+1'	Report	Muzhikov (yellow card) 24'; Rolón 39'; Ćalasan (yellow card) 49'; Zhumakhanov (yellow card) 52'; Adambaev (yellow card) 90+1'	Stadium: Kazhymukan Munaitpasov Stadium; Attendance: 6,500; Referee: Georgiy Chekhovsky

21 June 2025 13	Okzhetpes	0–1	Ordabasy	Kokshetau
20:30 (UTC+5)	Dosmagambetov (yellow card) 12'; Prce (yellow card) 17'	Report	Antić (yellow card) 7'; S.Astanov (yellow card) 10'; Tursynbay 90+4'; Čanađija (yellow card) 90+4'	Stadium: Okzhetpes Stadium; Attendance: Arman Ismuratov; Referee: 3,200

29 June 2025 14	Ordabasy	0–1	Kairat	Shymkent
20:00 (UTC+5)	Čanađija (yellow card) 9'; S.Astanov (yellow card) 32'; Jimoh (yellow card) 54'; Zhaksybaev (yellow card) 71'	Report	Jorginho 18'; Gromyko (yellow card) 25'; Arad (yellow card) 45+1'; Glazer (yellow card) 47' (yellow-red card) 80'; Kasabulat (yellow card) 48'; Edmilson (red card) 88'; Zarutskiy (yellow card) 90+3'	Stadium: Kazhymukan Munaitpasov Stadium; Attendance: 10,000; Referee: Denis Tevyashov

5 July 2025 15	Kyzylzhar	0–0	Ordabasy	Petropavl
18:00 (UTC+5)	Muldinov (yellow card) 23'; Vasilyev (yellow card) 35'; Sabino (yellow card) 55'	Report	Jimoh (red card) 19'; Čanađija (red card) 42'; Khalmatov (yellow card) 90+3'; Imnadze (yellow card) 90+4'	Stadium: Karasai Stadium; Attendance: 3,500; Referee: Sayat Sulikanov

13 July 2025 16	Ordabasy	1–0	Astana	Shymkent
20:00 (UTC+5)	Zhaksybaev (yellow card) 34'; Sultaniyazov (yellow card) 47' (yellow-red card) 67'; Everton 85'; Căpățînă (yellow card) 90'	Report		Stadium: Kazhymukan Munaitpasov Stadium; Attendance: 8,000; Referee: Bulat Sariev

20 July 2025 17	Zhetysu	1–0	Ordabasy	Taldykorgan
20:00 (UTC+5)	Mukhametkhanov (yellow card) 68'; Karwot (yellow card) 90'; Kovel (yellow card) 90+1'; Raphael 90+3'	Report	Vakulko (yellow card) 52'; Imnadze (yellow card) 82'; Khalmatov (yellow card) 87'; Jimoh (yellow card) 88'	Stadium: Jetisu Stadium; Attendance: 3,000; Referee: Aleksandr Zatula

27 July 2025 18	Turan	0–4	Ordabasy	Turkistan
20:00 (UTC+5)	Solodovnicov (yellow card) 26'; Asan (yellow card) 86'	Report	Everton (yellow card) 37'; Naumets 65'; Čanađija 75'; Imnadze 77'; Malyi 90+6'	Stadium: Turkistan Arena; Attendance: 1,500; Referee: Anton Kuchma

3 August 2025 19	Ordabasy	2–2	Atyrau	Shymkent
20:00 (UTC+5)	E.Astanov 3' (pen.); Imnadze 26' (yellow card) 66'; Tursynbay (yellow card) 28'; Căpățînă (yellow card) 45'; Vakulko 52'; Malyi (yellow card) 61'	Report	Abubakar (yellow card) 23'; Chunchukov (yellow card) 34'; Yudenkov 51'; Dorofeyev 79'	Stadium: Kazhymukan Munaitpasov Stadium; Attendance: 3,100; Referee: Saken Bayimbet

10 August 2025 20	Kaisar	1–1	Ordabasy	Kyzylorda
20:00 (UTC+5)	Zhaksylykov (penalty missed) 35' 41' (pen.)	Report	Vakulko (yellow card) 11'; Malyi (yellow card) 40'; Antić 76'	Stadium: Gani Muratbayev Stadium; Attendance: 6,500; Referee: Arman Ismuratov

17 August 2025 21	Ordabasy	2–3	Tobol	Shymkent
20:00 (UTC+5)	Everton 54'; Zhaksybaev (yellow card) 58'; Vakulko (yellow card) 64'; Malyi (yellow card) 66'; Dias (yellow card) 73'; E.Astanov 82' (pen.); Čanađija (yellow card) 87'; Amir (yellow card) 90+2'	Report	El Messaoudi 14', 32'; Tagybergen 40' (yellow card) 78'; Chesnokov (yellow card) 45'; Braga (yellow card) 90+6'; Busurmanov (yellow card) 90+8'	Stadium: Kazhymukan Munaitpasov Stadium; Attendance: 5,000; Referee: Denis Tevyashov

24 August 2025 22	Ulytau	2–1	Ordabasy	Jezkazgan
17:00 (UTC+5)	Yusov 10'; Nursultanov (yellow card) 55'; Bugulov 79'; Keiler (yellow card) 87'	Report	Tursynbay (yellow card) 29'; E.Astanov (yellow card) 55'; Sultaniyazov 76'	Stadium: Metallurg Stadium; Attendance: 2,000; Referee: Sergey Nozhenko

13 September 2025 23	Ordabasy	2–1	Jenis	Shymkent
18:00 (UTC+5)	S.Astanov (yellow card) 56'; Zhaksybaev 71'; Khalmatov 73' (pen.); Shayzada (yellow card) 88'	Report	Kuat (yellow card) 36'; Tevzadze (yellow card) 69'; Lobjanidze (penalty missed) 87'; Sadovsky 90+1' (yellow card) 90+2'	Stadium: Kazhymukan Munaitpasov Stadium; Attendance: 2,480; Referee: Sayat Sulikanov

24 September 2025 9	Tobol	1–0	Ordabasy	Kostanay
19:00 (UTC+5)	Chesnokov 14' (pen.); Ndiaye (yellow card) 66'	Report	Everton (yellow card) 3'; S.Astanov (yellow card) 17'; Antić (yellow card) 37'; Zhaksybaev (yellow card) 90+7'	Stadium: Central Stadium; Attendance: 4,000; Referee: Arman Ismuratov
Note: Match originally scheduled for 18 May, but postponed on 17 May after Ordabasy's flight to Kostanay was cancelled due to bad weather.

28 September 2025 24	Yelimay	2–1	Ordabasy	Semey
17:00 (UTC+5)	Odeyobo (yellow card) 24'; Zhumakhanov (yellow card) 63'; Orazov 84'; Tyulyubay (yellow card) 90'; Murtazayev 90+5'	Report	E.Astanov 3'; S.Astanov (yellow card) 29'	Stadium: Spartak Stadium; Referee: Sayat Karabaev

19 October 2025 25	Ordabasy	7–1	Okzhetpes	Shymkent
18:00 (UTC+5)	Paulino 7', 24'; E.Astanov 36', 45'; Imnadze 64'; Malyi 77'; Căpățînă 83'	Report	Zhumat 59'; Idrisov (yellow card) 86'	Stadium: Kazhymukan Munaitpasov Stadium; Attendance: 2,000; Referee: Marat Iskakov

26 October 2025 26	Aktobe	2–2	Ordabasy	Aktobe
15:00 (UTC+5)	Tanzharikov (yellow card) 5'; Kusyapov (yellow card) 31'; Jean (yellow card) 44'; Shushenachev 50', 77'; Seydakhmet (yellow card) 71'; Shvyryov (yellow card) 83'	Report	Everton 17'; E.Astanov 45+3'; Malyi (yellow card) 64'	Stadium: Central Stadium; Attendance: 8,500; Referee: Arman Ismuratov

==== League table ====
Pos	Team	Pld	W	D	L	GF	GA	GD	Pts
5	Aktobe	26	13	4	9	39	29	+10	43
6	Jenis	26	8	12	6	37	30	+7	36
7	Ordabasy	26	9	8	9	37	28	+9	35
8	Okzhetpes	26	10	5	11	37	43	−6	35
9	Kyzylzhar	26	6	9	11	25	32	−7	27

Source: UEFA, Soccerway
Rules for classification: 1) Points; 2) Goal difference; 3) Matches won; 4) Goals scored; 5) Away goals scored; 6) Head-to-head points; 7) Head-to-head matches won; 8) Head-to-head goal difference; 9) Head-to-head goals scored; 10) Head-to-head away goals scored; 11) Draw.

=== Kazakhstan Cup ===
13 April 2025 Round of 16	Khan-Tengri	0–2	Ordabasy	Almaty
15:00 (UTC+5)	Litosh (yellow card) 57'; Zakharchenko (yellow card) 58'; (yellow card) 59'	Report	Malyi (yellow card) 3'; Everton 25'; Jimoh 47'; Antić (yellow card) 58' (yellow-red card) 90+1'	Stadium: Sportivnyy Kompleks Kaznu; Referee: Danil Gorda

14 May 2025 Quarter-finals	Ordabasy	1–0	Kairat	Shymkent
18:00 (UTC+5)	Paulino 34'; Nuraly (yellow card) 54'; Malyi (yellow card) 57'; Abubakar (yellow card) 65'	Report	Gromyko (yellow card) 90+3'	Stadium: Kazhymukan Munaitpasov Stadium; Attendance: 12,000; Referee: Marat Iskakov

25 June 2025 Semi-final 1st leg	Kyzylzhar	0–0	Ordabasy	Petropavl
18:00 (UTC+5)	Vasilyev (yellow card) 29'; Valiullin (yellow card) 54'; Sabino (yellow card) 78'	Report	Everton (yellow card) 21'	Stadium: Karasai Stadium; Attendance: 5,280; Referee: Daniyar Sakhi

28 August 2025 Semi-final 2nd leg	Ordabasy	1–0 (1–0 agg.)	Kyzylzhar	Shymkent
19:00 (UTC+5)	S.Astanov (yellow card) 11'; Vakulko (yellow card) 25'; Sultaniyazov (yellow card) 83'; Khalmatov 108' (yellow card) 120+3'; Amir (yellow card) 120+1'	Report	Buranchiev (yellow card) 40'; Gbamblé (yellow card) 45+4'; Kozlenko (yellow card) 58'; Sebai (yellow card) 82'; Sabino (yellow card) 103'; Touré (yellow card) 105'	Stadium: Kazhymukan Munaitpasov Stadium; Referee: Bulat Sariev

4 October 2025 Final	Ordabasy	0–2	Tobol	Kyzylorda
21:00 (UTC+5)	Imnadze (yellow card) 49'; E.Astanov (yellow card) 90+1'; Vakulko (yellow card) 90+4'	Report	Signevich 19'; Chesnokov 33'; Mosiashvili (yellow card) 90+1'	Stadium: Gani Muratbayev Stadium; Referee: Sven Wolfensberger

=== UEFA Champions League ===
==== Qualifying rounds ====
10 July 2025 First qualifying round 1st leg	Torpedo Kutaisi (Georgia (country))	4–3	(Kazakhstan) Ordabasy	Kutaisi, Georgia
21:00 (UTC+5)	Johnsen 30', 79'; Šimić 45+2', 90+4'; Gudushauri (yellow card) 76'; Itrak (yellow card) 90+1'	Report	Căpățînă 32'; Imnadze 35'; Naumets 69'	Stadium: Ramaz Shengelia Stadium; Attendance: 5,672; Referee: Anton Lashuk (Belarus)

17 July 2025 First qualifying round 2nd leg	Ordabasy (Kazakhstan)	1–1 (4–5 agg.)	(Georgia (country)) Torpedo Kutaisi	Shymkent, Kazakhstan
21:00 (UTC+5)	Vakulko (yellow card) 57'; Malyi (yellow card) 79'; Zhumabek 90+6'	Report	Bidzinashvili 13'; Kvirkvelia (yellow card) 45+1' (yellow-red card) 49'	Stadium: Kazhymukan Munaitpasov Stadium; Attendance: 17,200; Referee: Nikola Popov (Bulgaria)

== Squad statistics ==
As of match played 26 October 2025

=== Appearances and goals ===
No.	Pos	Nat	Player	Total		Premier League		Kazakhstan Cup		Conference League	
No.	Pos	Nat	Player	Apps	Goals	Apps	Goals	Apps	Goals	Apps	Goals
1	GK	(Kazakhstan) KAZ	Bekkhan Shayzada	23	0	22	0	0	0	1	0
3	DF	(Brazil) BRA	Alan Dias	3	0	2+1	0	0	0	0	0
4	DF	(Moldova) MDA	Victor Mudrac	11	1	9	1	2	0	0	0
5	DF	(Serbia) SRB	Nikola Antić	28	1	21+1	1	4	0	2	0
6	DF	(Kazakhstan) KAZ	Ular Zhaksybaev	21	1	16+1	1	2	0	2	0
7	MF	(Georgia (country)) GEO	Luka Imnadze	33	4	24+2	3	5	0	2	1
8	MF	(Ukraine) UKR	Yuriy Vakulko	17	0	9+3	0	2+1	0	2	0
9	FW	(Brazil) BRA	Everton Moraes	31	7	21+4	6	4	1	2	0
10	FW	(Kazakhstan) KAZ	Abylaykhan Zhumabek	11	1	5+4	0	0+1	0	0+1	1
11	MF	(Kazakhstan) KAZ	Yerkebulan Tungyshbayev	17	1	0+14	1	0+3	0	0	0
13	DF	(Kazakhstan) KAZ	Sagadat Tursynbay	20	2	11+4	1	2+1	0	2	1
16	MF	(Romania) ROU	Mihai Căpățînă	17	2	11+2	1	2	0	2	1
17	FW	(Kazakhstan) KAZ	Zikrillo Sultaniyazov	24	2	8+10	2	1+4	0	0+1	0
20	MF	(Kazakhstan) KAZ	Elkhan Astanov	11	6	9	6	2	0	0	0
22	DF	(Kazakhstan) KAZ	Sultanbek Astanov	33	2	26	2	5	0	2	0
23	MF	(Kazakhstan) KAZ	Murodzhon Khalmatov	30	3	18+5	2	4+1	1	0+2	0
25	DF	(Kazakhstan) KAZ	Serhiy Malyi	29	5	22+1	5	3+1	0	2	0
27	MF	(Croatia) CRO	Dario Čanađija	23	1	5+12	1	3+2	0	0+1	0
29	FW	(Kazakhstan) KAZ	Bagdaulet Nuraly	10	0	1+8	0	1	0	0	0
30	MF	(Ukraine) UKR	Vladyslav Naumets	16	1	7+5	1	0+2	0	1+1	0
34	GK	(Moldova) MDA	Dumitru Celeadnic	10	0	4	0	5	0	1	0
47	DF	(Kazakhstan) KAZ	Zhasulan Amir	15	0	1+12	0	0+2	0	0	0
88	FW	(Kazakhstan) KAZ	Alibek Khaldar	2	0	0+2	0	0	0	0	0
98	MF	(Cape Verde) CPV	João Paulino	21	3	10+6	2	3+1	1	1	0
Players away from Ordabasy on loan:
Players who left Ordabasy during the season:
8	MF	(Kazakhstan) KAZ	Askhat Tagybergen	2	0	2	0	0	0	0	0
10	FW	(Kazakhstan) KAZ	Vyacheslav Shvyryov	7	0	1+6	0	0	0	0	0
14	MF	(Ivory Coast) CIV	Sherif Jimoh	20	1	13+2	0	3	1	0+2	0
18	MF	(Ghana) GHA	Rashid Abubakar	11	0	5+4	0	2	0	0	0
77	FW	(Nigeria) NGA	Kayode Saliman	9	0	3+3	0	0+3	0	0	0

=== Goal scorers ===
Place	Position	Nation	Number	Name	Premier League	Kazakhstan Cup	UEFA Conference League	Total
1	FW	(Brazil)	9	Everton Moraes	6	1	0	7
2	MF	(Kazakhstan)	20	Elkhan Astanov	6	0	0	6
3	DF	(Kazakhstan)	25	Serhiy Malyi	5	0	0	5
4	MF	(Georgia (country))	7	Luka Imnadze	3	0	1	4
5	MF	(Kazakhstan)	23	Murodzhon Khalmatov	2	1	0	3
5	MF	(Cape Verde)	98	João Paulino	2	1	0	3
7	DF	(Kazakhstan)	22	Sultanbek Astanov	2	0	0	2
7	FW	(Kazakhstan)	17	Zikrillo Sultaniyazov	2	0	0	2
7	DF	(Kazakhstan)	13	Sagadat Tursynbay	1	0	1	2
7	MF	(Romania)	16	Mihai Căpățînă	1	0	1	2
11	DF	(Moldova)	4	Victor Mudrac	1	0	0	1
11	MF	(Kazakhstan)	11	Yerkebulan Tungyshbayev	1	0	0	1
11	MF	(Croatia)	27	Dario Čanađija	1	0	0	1
11	MF	(Ukraine)	30	Vladyslav Naumets	1	0	0	1
11	DF	(Serbia)	5	Nikola Antić	1	0	0	1
11	MF	(Kazakhstan)	6	Ular Zhaksybaev	1	0	0	1
11	MF	(Ivory Coast)	14	Sherif Jimoh	0	1	0	1
11	FW	(Kazakhstan)	10	Abylaykhan Zhumabek	0	0	1	1
11				Own goal	1	0	0	1
				TOTALS	37	4	4	45

=== Clean sheets ===
Place	Position	Nation	Number	Name	Premier League	Kazakhstan Cup	UEFA Conference League	Total
1	GK	(Kazakhstan)	1	Bekkhan Shayzada	7	0	0	7
2	GK	(Moldova)	34	Dumitru Celeadnic	2	4	0	6
				TOTALS	9	4	0	13

=== Disciplinary record ===
Number	Nation	Position	Name	Premier League		Kazakhstan Cup		UEFA Conference League		Total	
Number	Nation	Position	Name	Booked	Sent off (straight red)	Booked	Sent off (straight red)	Booked	Sent off (straight red)	Booked	Sent off (straight red)
1	(Kazakhstan)	GK	Bekkhan Shayzada	1	0	0	0	0	0	1	0
3	(Brazil)	DF	Alan Dias	1	0	0	0	0	0	1	0
5	(Serbia)	DF	Nikola Antić	4	0	2	1	0	0	6	1
6	(Kazakhstan)	DF	Ular Zhaksybaev	9	1	0	0	0	0	9	1
7	(Georgia (country))	MF	Luka Imnadze	4	0	1	0	0	0	5	0
8	(Ukraine)	MF	Yuriy Vakulko	4	0	2	0	0	0	6	0
9	(Brazil)	FW	Everton Moraes	2	0	1	0	0	0	3	0
13	(Kazakhstan)	DF	Sagadat Tursynbay	2	0	0	0	0	0	2	0
16	(Romania)	MF	Mihai Căpățînă	2	0	0	0	0	0	2	0
17	(Kazakhstan)	FW	Zikrillo Sultaniyazov	5	1	1	0	0	0	6	1
20	(Kazakhstan)	MF	Elkhan Astanov	1	0	1	0	0	0	2	0
22	(Kazakhstan)	DF	Sultanbek Astanov	7	0	1	0	0	0	8	0
23	(Kazakhstan)	MF	Murodzhon Khalmatov	6	0	1	0	0	0	7	0
25	(Kazakhstan)	DF	Serhiy Malyi	7	0	2	0	1	0	10	0
27	(Croatia)	MF	Dario Čanađija	4	1	0	0	0	0	4	1
29	(Kazakhstan)	FW	Bagdaulet Nuraly	0	0	1	0	0	0	1	0
30	(Ukraine)	MF	Vladyslav Naumets	0	0	0	0	1	0	1	0
47	(Kazakhstan)	DF	Zhasulan Amir	3	0	1	0	0	0	4	0
Players away on loan:
Players who left Ordabasy during the season:
10	(Kazakhstan)	FW	Vyacheslav Shvyryov	1	1	0	0	0	0	1	1
14	(Ivory Coast)	MF	Sherif Jimoh	3	1	0	0	0	0	3	1
18	(Ghana)	MF	Rashid Abubakar	1	0	1	0	0	0	2	0
77	(Nigeria)	FW	Kayode Saliman	1	0	0	0	0	0	1	0
			TOTALS	73	5	10	1	2	0	85	6
