= 1968 in Soviet football =

Football in the Soviet Union
- Season: 1968

Men's football
- Class A 1. Group: Dinamo Kiev
- Class A 2. Group: Uralmash Sverdlovsk
- Class B: Mashuk Piatigorsk (Russia); Avangard Ternopol (Ukraine); Yenbek Zhezkazgan (Kazakhstan); Sverdlovets Tashkent Oblast (Central Asia)
- Soviet Cup: Torpedo Moscow

The 1968 Soviet football championship was the 36th seasons of competitive football in the Soviet Union and the 30th among teams of sports societies and factories. Dinamo Kiev won the championship becoming the Soviet domestic champions for the fourth time and the third in a row becoming the second team to accomplish it.

== Honours ==
Competition	Winner	Runner-up
Class A 1. Group	Dinamo Kiev (4)	Spartak Moscow
Class A 2. Group	Uralmash Sverdlovsk (1)	Karpaty Lvov
Class B	Mashuk Piatigorsk (Russia)	Kalininets Sverdlovsk (Russia)
Class B	Avangard Ternopol (Ukraine)	Bukovina Chernovtsy (Ukraine)
Class B	Yenbek Zhezkazgan (Kazakhstan)	ADK Alma-Ata (Kazakhstan)
Class B	Sverdlovets Tashkent Oblast (Central Asia)	Ok Oltyn Andizhan Oblast (Central Asia)
Soviet Cup	Torpedo Moscow (4)	Pakhtakor Tashkent

Notes = Number in parentheses is the times that club has won that honour. * indicates new record for competition

== Soviet Union football championship ==
=== Class A First Group ===
Pos	Team	Pld	W	D	L	GF	GA	GD	Pts	Qualification or relegation
1	(Ukrainian Soviet Socialist Republic) Dynamo Kyiv (C)	38	21	15	2	58	25	+33	57	Qualification for European Cup first round
2	(Russian Soviet Federative Socialist Republic) Spartak Moscow	38	21	10	7	64	43	+21	52	
3	(Russian Soviet Federative Socialist Republic) Torpedo Moscow	38	18	14	6	60	32	+28	50	Qualification for Cup Winners' Cup preliminary round
4	(Russian Soviet Federative Socialist Republic) CSKA Moscow	38	20	10	8	50	30	+20	50	
5	(Russian Soviet Federative Socialist Republic) Dynamo Moscow	38	19	9	10	58	32	+26	47	
6	(Byelorussian Soviet Socialist Republic) Dinamo Minsk	38	17	12	9	52	36	+16	46	
7	(Georgian Soviet Socialist Republic) Dinamo Tbilisi	38	16	13	9	53	29	+24	45	
8	(Ukrainian Soviet Socialist Republic) Chornomorets Odessa	38	11	16	11	47	49	−2	38	
9	(Azerbaijan Soviet Socialist Republic) Neftchi Baku	38	13	12	13	42	48	−6	38	
10	(Russian Soviet Federative Socialist Republic) Lokomotiv Moscow	38	10	17	11	35	39	−4	37	
11	(Russian Soviet Federative Socialist Republic) Zenit Leningrad	38	10	14	14	35	49	−14	34	
12	(Russian Soviet Federative Socialist Republic) SKA Rostov-on-Don	38	11	11	16	44	48	−4	33	
13	(Ukrainian Soviet Socialist Republic) Zarya Voroshilovgrad	38	10	13	15	23	41	−18	33	
14	(Ukrainian Soviet Socialist Republic) Shakhtar Donetsk	38	9	14	15	38	42	−4	32	
15	(Kazakh Soviet Socialist Republic) Kairat Alma-Ata	38	12	8	18	33	42	−9	32	
16	(Armenian Soviet Socialist Republic) Ararat Yerevan	38	11	9	18	34	46	−12	31	
17	(Uzbek Soviet Socialist Republic) Pakhtakor Tashkent	38	9	11	18	42	61	−19	29	
18	(Russian Soviet Federative Socialist Republic) Krylya Sovetov Kuybyshev	38	9	11	18	24	45	−21	29	
19	(Georgian Soviet Socialist Republic) Torpedo Kutaisi	38	9	10	19	27	48	−21	28	
20	(Azerbaijan Soviet Socialist Republic) Dynamo Kirovobad (R)	38	5	9	24	25	59	−34	19	Relegation to Class A Second Group

Source: rsssf.com
(C) Champions; (R) Relegated

=== Class A Second Group finals ===
==== For places 1-4 ====
[Nov 17–24, Sochi]

Pos	Rep	Team	Pld	W	D	L	GF	GA	GD	Pts	Promotion
1	RUS	UralMash Sverdlovsk	3	1	2	0	5	3	+2	4	Promoted
2	UKR	Karpaty Lvov	3	1	1	1	5	2	+3	3	
3	RUS	Irtysh Omsk	3	1	1	1	4	6	−2	3	
4	UKR	Sudnobudivnyk Mykolaiv	3	1	0	2	3	6	−3	2	

Source: rsssf.com

==== Relegation Tournament for Ukraine ====
[Nov 12-20]

Pos	Team	Pld	W	D	L	GF	GA	GD	Pts	Relegation
1	Krivbass Krivoi Rog	5	3	2	0	7	2	+5	8	
2	Khimik Severodonetsk	5	4	0	1	8	3	+5	8	
3	Azovets Zhdanov	5	2	2	1	4	4	0	6	
4	Dnepr Kremenchug	5	2	1	2	5	4	+1	5	Relegated
5	Avangard Zholtyye Vody	5	1	1	3	2	6	−4	3	Relegated
6	SKCF Sevastopol	5	0	0	5	2	9	−7	0	Relegated

Source: rsssf.com

=== Final group ===
[Nov 4–17, Pyatigorsk]

Pos	Team	Pld	W	D	L	GF	GA	GD	Pts
1	Mashuk Pyatigorsk	5	3	2	0	8	3	+5	8
2	Kalininets Sverdlovsk	5	3	0	2	5	3	+2	6
3	Spartak Belgorod	5	1	3	1	6	4	+2	5
4	Dinamo Bryansk	5	1	3	1	2	2	0	5
5	Narzan Kislovodsk	5	0	3	2	1	4	−3	3
6	Shakhtyor Prokopyevsk	5	1	1	3	5	11	−6	3

==== Ukraine finals ====
[Oct 25 – Nov 7, Ternopol, Chernovtsy]

Pos	Team	Pld	W	D	L	GF	GA	GD	Pts
1	Avangard Ternopol	7	4	3	0	10	2	+8	11
2	Bukovina Chernovtsy	7	4	3	0	11	4	+7	11
3	Shakhtyor Kadiyevka	7	2	4	1	5	4	+1	8
4	Desna Chernigov	7	3	2	2	6	6	0	8
5	Dinamo Khmelnitskiy	7	3	1	3	8	7	+1	7
6	Spartak Sumy	7	2	2	3	3	4	−1	6
7	Lokomotiv Donetsk	7	1	2	4	5	8	−3	4
8	Shakhtyor Alexandria	7	0	1	6	3	16	−13	1

Match for 1st place

Avangard Ternopol  2-0  Bukovina Chernovtsy

==== Kazakhstan ====
Pos	Team	Pld	W	D	L	GF	GA	GD	Pts
1	Yenbek Jezkazgan	40	27	10	3	70	24	+46	66 (Note: 2 bonus points awarded?)
2	ADK Alma-Ata	40	27	10	3	83	20	+63	64
3	Metallurg Temirtau	40	27	9	4	69	14	+55	63
4	Cementnik Semipalatinsk	40	28	6	6	79	18	+61	62
5	Traktor Pavlodar (Note: Irtysh Pavlodar changed name to Traktor.)	40	25	6	9	58	21	+37	56
6	Dinamo Tselinograd	40	23	7	10	66	40	+26	53
7	Energetik Jambul (Note: Voskhod Jambul changed name to Energetik.)	40	18	14	8	55	32	+23	50
8	Leninogorets Leninogorsk	40	16	8	16	41	61	−20	40
9	Avtomobilist Kustanay	40	13	14	13	32	36	−4	40
10	Torpedo Kokchetav	40	12	11	17	45	59	−14	35
11	Uralets Uralsk	40	14	7	19	45	54	−9	35
12	Irtysh Glubokoye	40	9	17	14	37	53	−16	35
13	Aktyubinets Aktyubinsk	40	11	13	16	29	48	−19	35
14	Metallurg Yermak	40	13	7	20	36	43	−7	33
15	Gornyak Kentau	40	11	9	20	39	66	−27	31
16	Stroitel Rudny	40	8	14	18	26	42	−16	30
17	Ugolshchik Shakhtinsk	40	9	11	20	21	37	−16	29
18	Avangard Petropavlovsk	40	7	11	22	30	54	−24	25
19	Phosphorite Karatau	40	6	13	21	22	64	−42	25
20	Aray Stepnogorsk	40	6	10	24	26	56	−30	22
21	Avtomobilist Kzil-Orda	40	3	7	30	17	84	−67	13

Notes:

Match for 1st place

Yenbek Jezkazgan  2-0  ADK Alma-Ata

==== Central Asia ====
Pos	Rep	Team	Pld	W	D	L	GF	GA	GD	Pts
1	UZB	Sverdlovets Tashkent Region	42	25	12	5	64	24	+40	62
2	UZB	Ok Oltyn Andizhan Region	42	22	11	9	66	37	+29	55
3	UZB	Samarkand (Note: Sogdiana Samarkand changed name to Samarkand.)	42	19	16	7	55	38	+17	54
4	TKM	Irrigator Charjou (Note: Zahmet Charjou changed name to Irrigator.)	42	22	9	11	64	37	+27	53
5	UZB	Yangiyer (Note: Tselinnik Yangiyer changed name to Yangiyer.)	42	17	19	6	47	27	+20	53
6	UZB	TashAvtoMash Tashkent	42	18	15	9	72	44	+28	51
7	KGZ	Alay Osh	42	21	9	12	57	37	+20	51
8	UZB	Khimik Chirchik	42	18	13	11	53	44	+9	49
9	UZB	Andizhan (Note: Spartak Andizhan changed name to Andizhan.)	42	18	10	14	49	36	+13	46
10	TJK	Pahtakor Kurgan-Tyube	42	14	16	12	45	38	+7	44
11	UZB	Pahtaaral Gulistan	42	13	16	13	50	45	+5	42
12	UZB	Akkurgan Tashkent Region	42	15	12	15	38	37	+1	42
13	UZB	Metallurg Almalyk	42	12	16	14	38	39	−1	40
14	TJK	Vakhsh Nurek	42	16	8	18	36	51	−15	40
15	UZB	Fakel Buhara	42	13	10	19	40	52	−12	36
16	TJK	Abreshimchi Leninabad	42	11	14	17	31	47	−16	36
17	KGZ	Khimik Kalinin District	42	13	7	22	35	42	−7	33
18	TKM	Kara-Kum Mary (Note: Murgab Mary changed name to Kara-Kum.)	42	12	8	22	31	55	−24	32
19	UZB	Mehnat Kokand	42	9	13	20	23	50	−27	31
20	UZB	Kolkhoz Narimanova Bagat	42	8	9	25	42	74	−32	25
21	UZB	Bekabad	42	8	9	25	34	86	−52	25
22	UZB	Chigarachi Termez	42	7	10	25	29	59	−30	24

Source: rsssf.com

=== Top goalscorers ===
Class A First Group

- Berador Abduraimov (Pakhtakor Tashkent), Gocha Gavasheli (Dinamo Tbilisi) – 22 goals
