= Nikola Antić =

Serbian footballer

Personal information
- Date of birth: 4 January 1994 (age 32)
- Place of birth: Belgrade, FR Yugoslavia
- Height: 1.78 m (5 ft 10 in)
- Position: Left-back

Team information
- Current team: Ordabasy
- Number: 5

Youth career
- 2004–2011: Partizan

Senior career*
Years	Team	Apps	(Gls)
2011–2014	Rad	19	(0)
2011–2012	→ Palić (loan)	18	(1)
2014	Red Star Belgrade	1	(0)
2015	Jagodina	8	(0)
2015–2018	Vojvodina	89	(0)
2019–2022	Shakhtyor Soligorsk	91	(12)
2023	Khimki	11	(0)
2023–2024	Partizan	42	(0)
2025–	Ordabasy	50	(2)

International career
	Serbia U17	7	(0)
2012–2013	Serbia U19	8	(1)
2016–2017	Serbia U21	4	(0)
2015	Serbia U23	1	(0)
Medal record
Gold medal – first place	UEFA Under-19 Championship	2013
- * Club domestic league appearances and goals as of 14:07, 31 October 2026 (UTC)

Nikola Antić (Serbian Cyrillic: Никола Антић; born 4 January 1994) is a Serbian professional footballer who plays as a defender for Kazakhstan Premier League club Ordabasy.

== Club career ==
Antić played for Partizan in youth categories, but he signed his first professional contract with Rad. He was one season at loan with Palić.

In August 2014, he signed a four-year contract with Red Star Belgrade. He played only one game with Red Star in Jelen Super Liga. In February 2015, he terminated his contract with the club and signed with Jagodina.

On 31 August 2015, Antić signed a three-year deal with Vojvodina. In January 2018, Antić extended his contract with club, signing a one-year extension.

On 3 February 2019, Nikola Antić left Vojvodina and signed for Belarusian club Shakhtyor Soligorsk.

On 10 February 2023, Antić signed a year-and-a-half contract with Russian Premier League club FC Khimki.

On 19 June 2023, Antić signed for Partizan. Sports director Ivica Kralj welcomed him to the club and presented him with the jersey number 15. On July 29, 2023, Antić made his debut in the first round of the Serbian SuperLiga in a match against TSC that ended in a 3–3 draw.

== Career statistics ==
As of match played 7 November 2026

Appearances and goals by club, season and competition
Club	Season	League			National cup (Note: Includes Serbian Cup, Belarusian Cup, Kazakhstan Cup)		Continental		Other		Total	
Club	Season	Division	Apps	Goals	Apps	Goals	Apps	Goals	Apps	Goals	Apps	Goals
Palić (loan)	2011–12	Serbian League Vojvodina	18	1	—		—		—		18	1
Rad	2012–13	Serbian SuperLiga	8	0	2	0	—		—		10	0
Rad	2013–14	Serbian SuperLiga	11	0	1	0	—		—		12	0
Rad	Total		19	0	3	0	—		—		22	0
Red Star Belgrade	2014–15	Serbian SuperLiga	1	0	1	0	—		—		2	0
Jagodina	2014–15	Serbian SuperLiga	8	0	2	0	—		—		10	0
Vojvodina	2015–16	Serbian SuperLiga	10	0	1	0	—		—		11	0
Vojvodina	2016–17	Serbian SuperLiga	35	0	4	0	8 (Note: Appearances in UEFA Europa League)	1	—		47	1
Vojvodina	2017–18	Serbian SuperLiga	30	0	2	0	0	0	—		32	0
Vojvodina	2018–19	Serbian SuperLiga	14	0	1	0	—		—		15	0
Vojvodina	Total		89	0	8	0	8	1	—		105	1
Shakhtyor Soligorsk	2019	Belarusian Premier League	25	3	4	1	—		—		29	4
Shakhtyor Soligorsk	2020	Belarusian Premier League	25	4	5	1	6	0	1	0	37	5
Shakhtyor Soligorsk	2021	Belarusian Premier League	16	2	4	0	4 (Note: Two appearances in UEFA Champions League, two appearances in UEFA Europa Conference League)	0	1	0	25	1
Shakhtyor Soligorsk	2022	Belarusian Premier League	25	3	1	0	4 (Note: Two appearances in UEFA Champions League, two appearances in UEFA Europa Conference League)	0	—		30	3
Shakhtyor Soligorsk	Total		91	12	14	2	14	0	2	0	121	13
Khimki	2022–23	Russian Premier League	11	0	—		—		—		11	0
Partizan	2023–24	Serbian SuperLiga	36	0	2	0	4 (Note: Appearances in UEFA Conference League)	0	—		42	0
Partizan	2024–25	Serbian SuperLiga	6	0	0	0	2 (Note: Appearances in UEFA Champions League)	0	—		8	0
Partizan	Total		42	0	2	0	6	0	—		50	0
Ordabasy	2025	Kazakhstan Premier League	22	1	4	0	2	0	—		28	1
Ordabasy	2026	Kazakhstan Premier League	28	1	4	0	—		—		32	1
Ordabasy	Total		50	2	8	0	2	0	—		60	2
Career total			329	15	38	2	30	1	2	0	399	17

== Honours ==
Shakhtyor Soligorsk

- Belarusian Premier League: 2020, 2021
- Belarusian Cup: 2018–19
- Belarusian Super Cup: 2021

Ordabasy

- Kazakhstan Premier League: 2026
- Kazakhstan Cup: 2026
