= Mihai Căpățînă =

Romanian footballer (born 1995)

Personal information
- Full name: Mihai Cristian Căpățînă
- Date of birth: 16 December 1995 (age 30)
- Place of birth: Slatina, Romania
- Height: 1.83 m (6 ft 0 in)
- Positions: Midfielder; right back

Team information
- Current team: Ordabasy
- Number: 16

Youth career
- 2004–2008: Școala de Fotbal Răzvan Raț
- 2008–2013: Sporting Pitești

Senior career*
Years	Team	Apps	(Gls)
2013–2015	Olt Slatina	34	(1)
2016–2020	Voluntari	151	(19)
2020–2025	Universitatea Craiova	123	(4)
2025–	Ordabasy	42	(2)

International career
2016–2017	Romania U21	1	(0)
- * Club domestic league appearances and goals as of 13:58, 31 October 2026 (UTC)

Mihai Cristian Căpățînă (born 16 December 1995) is a Romanian professional footballer who plays as a midfielder or a right back for Kazakhstan Premier League club Ordabasy.

== Career statistics ==
=== Club ===
As of match played 7 November 2026

Appearances and goals by club, season and competition
Club	Season	League			National cup (Note: Includes Cupa României, Kazakhstan Cup)		Continental		Other		Total	
Club	Season	Division	Apps	Goals	Apps	Goals	Apps	Goals	Apps	Goals	Apps	Goals
Olt Slatina	2013–14	Liga II	13	0	0	0	—		—		13	0
Olt Slatina	2014–15	Liga II	21	1	0	0	—		—		21	1
Olt Slatina	Total		34	1	0	0	—		—		34	1
Voluntari	2015–16	Liga I	3	0	0	0	—		2 (Note: Appearances in Liga I promotion/relegation play-offs)	0	5	0
Voluntari	2016–17	Liga I	36	4	5	1	—		1 (Note: Appearance in Cupa Ligii)	0	42	5
Voluntari	2017–18	Liga I	30	2	1	0	—		3 (Note: One appearance in Supercupa României, two appearances in Liga I promotion/relegation play-offs)	0	34	2
Voluntari	2018–19	Liga I	37	3	2	0	—		—		39	3
Voluntari	2019–20	Liga I	39	8	2	0	—		—		41	6
Voluntari	2020–21	Liga I	6	2	0	0	—		—		6	2
Voluntari	Total		151	19	10	1	—		6	0	167	20
Universitatea Craiova	2020–21	Liga I	24	0	4	0	—		—		28	0
Universitatea Craiova	2021–22	Liga I	19	1	1	0	1 (Note: Appearance(s) in UEFA Conference League)	0	0	0	21	1
Universitatea Craiova	2022–23	Liga I	30	0	1	0	6	0	—		37	1
Universitatea Craiova	2023–24	Liga I	30	2	4	0	—		0	0	34	2
Universitatea Craiova	2024–25	Liga I	20	1	4	0	1	0	—		25	1
Universitatea Craiova	Total		123	4	14	0	8	0	0	0	145	4
Ordabasy	2025	Kazakhstan Premier League	13	1	2	0	2	1	—		17	2
Ordabasy	2026	Kazakhstan Premier League	29	1	5	0	—		—		34	1
Ordabasy	Total		42	2	7	0	2	1	—		51	3
Career total			350	26	31	1	10	1	6	0	397	28

== Honours ==
Voluntari

- Cupa României: 2016–17
- Supercupa României: 2017

Universitatea Craiova

- Cupa României: 2020–21
- Supercupa României: 2021

Ordabasy

- Kazakhstan Premier League: 2026
- Kazakhstan Cup: 2026; runner-up: 2025
