= 2025 Kazakhstan Cup =

Tournament details
- Country: Kazakhstan
- Teams: 30

Final positions
- Champions: Tobol (3rd title)
- Runners-up: Ordabasy

The 2025 Kazakhstan Cup (known as the Fonbet Kazakhstan Cup for sponsorship reasons) is the 33rd season of the Kazakhstan Cup, the annual nationwide football cup competition of Kazakhstan since the independence of the country. Aktobe were the defending champions.

== Participating clubs ==
The Kazakhstan Football League announced that 30 clubs would participate in the 2025 edition of the Kazakhstan Cup, commencing on 15 March 2025.

== Preliminary round ==
Sixteen teams from the Kazakhstan First and Second Divisions entered the preliminary round, with the two winners advancing to the Round of 16.

=== Quarter-finals ===
==== Summary ====
Team 1	Score	Team 2
Khan-Tengri	1–1 (5–4 p)	Arys
Taraz	0–0 (2–4 p)	Talas
Altai	0–0 (4–2 p)	Zhetisay
Ekibastuzets	3–2	Maktaaral
Jas Qyran	0–1	AKAS
Caspiy	2–2 (4–2 p)	Akademia Ontustik
Irtysh Pavlodar	1–1 (4–3 p)	Shakhter Karagandy
Turkistan	0–5	SD Family

=== Semi-finals ===
==== Summary ====
Team 1	Score	Team 2
Talas	0–2	Khan-Tengri
Altai	0–1	Ekibastuzets
Caspiy	0–0 (4–2 p)	AKAS
Irtysh Pavlodar	2–1	SD Family

=== Finals ===
==== Summary ====
Team 1	Score	Team 2
Khan-Tengri	1–1 (4–2 p)	Ekibastuzets
Caspiy	3–0	Irtysh Pavlodar

== Round of 16 ==
The two preliminary round winners and the fourteen teams from the 2025 Kazakhstan Premier League entered the Round of 16, which took place on 12 and 13 April 2025.

=== Summary ===
Team 1	Score	Team 2
Ulytau	0–4	Elimai
Kyzylzhar	1–0	Kaisar
Kairat	3–0	Caspiy
Turan	2–0	Atyrau
Khan-Tengri	0–2	Ordabasy
Okzhetpes	1–1 (7–8 p)	Astana
Jenis	1–0	Aktobe
Tobol	1–0 (a.e.t.)	Zhetysu

== Quarter-finals ==
The eight round of 16 winners entered the quarter-finals, which took place on 14 May 2025.

=== Summary ===
Team 1	Score	Team 2
Kyzylzhar	1–0	Elimai
Ordabasy	1–0	Kairat
Jenis	1–1 (4–3 p)	Astana
Turan	0–2	Tobol

== Semi-finals ==
The four quarter-final winners entered the semi-finals, held over two legs. The first legs took place on 25 June 2025, followed by the second legs on 30 August.

=== Summary ===
Team 1	Agg.	Team 2	1st leg	2nd leg
Kyzylzhar	0–1	Ordabasy	0–0	0–1
Tobol	3–2	Jenis	2–1	1–1

== Final ==
4 October 2025 Final	Ordabasy	0–2	Tobol	Kyzylorda
16:00 (UTC+5)	Luka Imnadze (yellow card) 49'; Elkhan Astanov (yellow card) 90+1'; Yuriy Vakulko (yellow card) 90+4'		Nikolay Signevich 19'; Islam Chesnokov 33'; Tsotne Mosiashvili (yellow card) 90+1'	Stadium: Kaisar Arena; Referee: Sven Wolfensberger
