= Sherif Jimoh =

Ivorian footballer

Personal information
- Full name: Sherif Olatundé Jimoh
- Date of birth: 4 May 1996 (age 30)
- Place of birth: Abidjan, Ivory Coast
- Height: 1.79 m (5 ft 10 1/2 in)
- Position: Defender

Team information
- Current team: Neman Grodno
- Number: 14

Youth career
- –2013: Athlétic Adjamé

Senior career*
Years	Team	Apps	(Gls)
2013–2019	Athlétic Adjamé		
2019–2021	San Pedro		
2021–2022	Neman Grodno	37	(1)
2023–2024	BATE Borisov	53	(1)
2025	Ordabasy	15	(0)
2026–	Neman Grodno	7	(0)

International career
2013	Ivory Coast U17	5	(0)
2015	Ivory Coast U20		
2015	Ivory Coast U22	3	(0)
2015–2019	Ivory Coast	7	(0)
- * Club domestic league appearances and goals as of 3 July 2026

Sherif Olatundé Jimoh (born 4 May 1996) is an Ivorian professional footballer who plays as a defender for Neman Grodno.

== Club career ==
In 2014, Jimoh was invited to trial with Swiss side FC Basel.

== International career ==
Jimoh represented the Ivory Coast under 17 side at the 2013 FIFA U-17 World Cup, the under 20 side at the 2015 African U-20 Championship and the under 22 side at the 2015 Toulon Tournament. He made his senior international debut in October 2015 in a 2–1 defeat by Ghana.

== International statistics ==
As of match played 17 August 2017.

National team	Year	Apps	Goals
Ivory Coast	2015	2	0
Ivory Coast	2017	3	0
Ivory Coast	2019	2	0
Ivory Coast	Total	7	0
