= Dragan Stoisavljević =

Serbian association football player

Personal information
- Date of birth: 25 November 2003 (age 22)
- Place of birth: Belgrade, Serbia and Montenegro
- Height: 1.89 m (6 ft 2 in)
- Position: Forward

Team information
- Current team: Altai
- Number: 99

Senior career*
Years	Team	Apps	(Gls)
2019–2023	Voždovac	74	(5)
2022	→ Radnički Beograd (loan)	16	(4)
2024–2025	OFK Beograd	17	(3)
2024	→ Zemun (loan)	10	(1)
2025–2026	OFK Petrovac	9	(0)
2026–	Altai	29	(4)
- * Club domestic league appearances and goals as of 1 November 2026

Dragan Stoisavljević (Serbian Cyrillic: Драган Стоисављевић; born 25 November 2003) is a Serbian footballer who plays as a forward for Kazakhstan Premier League club Altai.

== Career statistics ==
As of 12 April 2024

Club	Season	League			Cup		Continental		Other		Total	
Club	Season	Division	Apps	Goals	Apps	Goals	Apps	Goals	Apps	Goals	Apps	Goals
Voždovac	2019–20	Serbian SuperLiga	10	1	0	0	—		0	0	10	1
Voždovac	2020–21	Serbian SuperLiga	34	4	3	2	—		0	0	37	6
Voždovac	2021–22	Serbian SuperLiga	15	0	1	0	—		0	0	16	0
Voždovac	2022–23	Serbian SuperLiga	11	0	0	0	—		0	0	11	0
Voždovac	2023–24	Serbian SuperLiga	4	0	2	0	—		0	0	6	0
Career total			74	5	6	2	0	0	0	0	80	7
