= Ilya Chernyak =

Belarusian footballer

Personal information
- Full name: Ilya Igorevich Chernyak
- Date of birth: 19 May 2002 (age 24)
- Place of birth: Yaromina, Gomel District, Belarus
- Height: 1.84 m (6 ft 0 in)
- Position: Forward

Team information
- Current team: Ulytau
- Number: 22

Youth career
- SDYuShOR-8 Gomel
- Gomel

Senior career*
Years	Team	Apps	(Gls)
2020–2023	Shakhtyor Soligorsk	26	(7)
2021	→ Dinamo Zagreb II (loan)	9	(0)
2023	→ Akhmat Grozny (loan)	2	(0)
2023	Caspiy Aktau	8	(1)
2024	Dinamo Minsk	4	(0)
2024	Dinamo Brest	13	(1)
2025	Ufa	8	(2)
2025–2026	Široki Brijeg	12	(2)
2026–	Ulytau	15	(2)

International career
2022–2023	Belarus U21	6	(0)
2024	Belarus	1	(0)
- * Club domestic league appearances and goals as of 1 November 2026

Ilya Igorevich Chernyak (Belarusian: Ілля Ігаравіч Чарняк; Russian: Илья Игоревич Черняк; born 19 May 2002) is a Belarusian football player who plays for Kazakhstan Premier League side Ulytau.

== Club career ==
On 7 February 2023, Chernyak signed a contract with Russian Premier League club Akhmat Grozny until the end of the 2022–23 season, with an option to extend for additional three seasons. He made his RPL debut for Akhmat on 11 March 2023 in a game against Lokomotiv Moscow. On 6 June 2023, Akhmat announced that Chernyak left the club.

On 6 February 2026, Chernyak signed with Bosnian club NK Široki Brijeg on a contract running until the summer of 2027.

== International career ==
Chernyak made his debut for the senior Belarus national team on 26 March 2024 in a friendly against Malta.
