= Danila Nechayev =

Belarusian footballer

Personal information
- Date of birth: 30 October 1999 (age 27)
- Place of birth: Mogilev, Belarus
- Height: 1.86 m (6 ft 1 in)
- Position: Defender

Team information
- Current team: Irtysh Pavlodar
- Number: 27

Youth career
- 2016–2018: Dnepr Mogilev

Senior career*
Years	Team	Apps	(Gls)
2018	Dnepr Mogilev	2	(0)
2019	Dnyapro Mogilev	0	(0)
2019	→ Lida (loan)	25	(2)
2020	Belshina Bobruisk	19	(1)
2021–2023	BATE Borisov	66	(1)
2024–2025	Torpedo-BelAZ Zhodino	54	(1)
2026–	Irtysh Pavlodar	14	(1)

International career^{‡}
2020	Belarus U21	4	(0)
2021–2024	Belarus	9	(0)
- * Club domestic league appearances and goals as of 2 July 2026 ‡ National team caps and goals as of 26 March 2024

Danila Nechayev (Belarusian: Даніла Нячаеў; Russian: Данила Нечаев; born 30 October 1999) is a Belarusian professional footballer who plays for Irtysh Pavlodar and the Belarus national team.

== International career ==
He made his debut for Belarus national football team on 24 March 2021 in a friendly against Honduras.

== Honours ==
BATE Borisov

- Belarusian Cup winner: 2020–21
- Belarusian Super Cup winner: 2022
