= David Carmona (footballer, born 1997) =

Spanish footballer

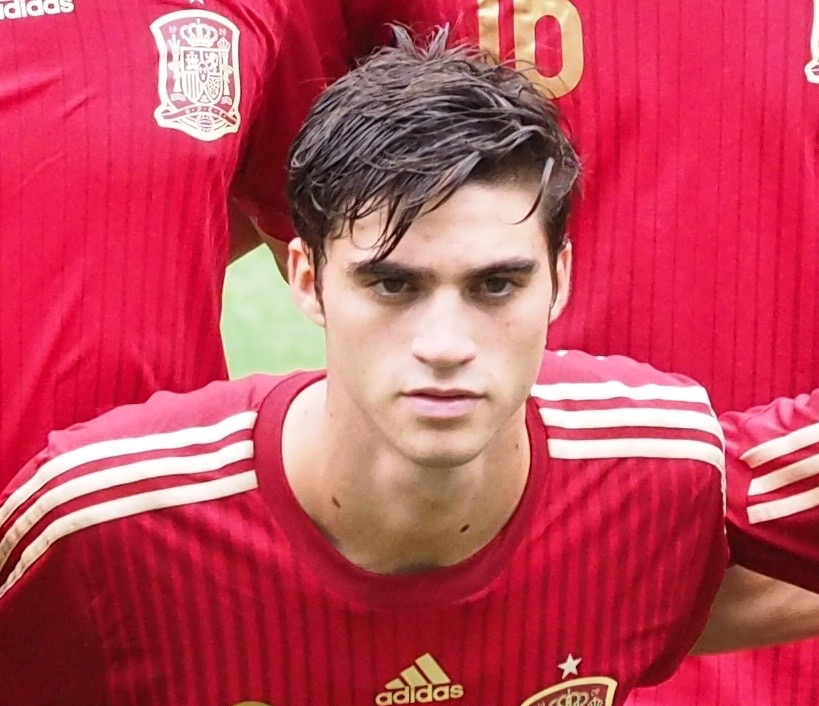

Personal information
- Full name: David Carmona Sierra
- Date of birth: 11 January 1997 (age 29)
- Place of birth: Palma del Río, Spain
- Height: 1.80 m (5 ft 11 in)
- Position: Right back

Team information
- Current team: Ulytau
- Number: 2

Youth career
- 2006–2014: Sevilla

Senior career*
Years	Team	Apps	(Gls)
2014–2018	Sevilla B	145	(1)
2016	Sevilla	1	(0)
2018–2020	Cádiz	7	(0)
2019–2020	→ Santander (loan)	23	(0)
2020–2021	Betis B	16	(1)
2021–2024	Asteras Tripolis	65	(1)
2024–2025	San Fernando	19	(0)
2025	KF Bylis	0	(0)
2026	Montana	16	(0)
2026–	Ulytau	14	(0)

International career
2015	Spain U18	4	(0)
2016	Spain U19	1	(0)
2017	Spain U21	2	(0)
- * Club domestic league appearances and goals as of 1 November 2026

David Carmona Sierra (born 11 January 1997) is a Spanish professional footballer who plays for Kazakhstan Premier League club Ulytau as a right back.

== Club career ==
Born in Palma del Río, Córdoba, Andalusia, Carmona joined Sevilla FC's youth setup in 2006 at the age of nine. On 26 October 2014, aged only 17, he made his senior debut for the reserves by coming on as a second-half substitute in a 1–3 Segunda División B home loss against Cádiz CF.

On 10 July 2015, Carmona renewed his contract until 2019. On 14 May of the following year, he made his first team – and La Liga – debut, starting in a 1–3 away loss against Athletic Bilbao.

Carmona scored his first professional goal on 8 January 2017, netting his team's fourth in a 5–3 home win against Real Oviedo. On 29 June of the following year, he signed a three-year deal with fellow second division side Cádiz CF.

On 15 July 2019, after being rarely used the previous campaign, Carmona joined fellow second division side Racing de Santander on a one-year loan deal. On 2 October of the following year, he terminated his contract with his parent club, and joined Real Betis' B-team the following day.

On 26 June 2021, Carmona, after he was released from Betis B, signed a three-year contract with Greek Super League club Asteras Tripolis.

== Career statistics ==
As of 30 January 2018

Appearances and goals by club, season and competition
Club	Season	League			Cup		Other		Total	
Club	Season	Division	Apps	Goals	Apps	Goals	Apps	Goals	Apps	Goals
Sevilla Atlético	2014–15	Segunda División B	26	0	0	0	0	0	26	0
Sevilla Atlético	2015–16	Segunda División B	42	0	0	0	0	0	42	0
Sevilla Atlético	2016–17	Segunda División	41	1	0	0	0	0	41	1
Sevilla Atlético	2017–18	Segunda División	20	0	0	0	0	0	20	0
Sevilla Atlético	Total		129	1	0	0	0	0	129	1
Sevilla	2015–16	La Liga	1	0	0	0	0	0	1	0
Sevilla	2016–17	La Liga	0	0	1	0	0	0	1	0
Sevilla	Total		1	0	1	0	0	0	2	0
Career totals			130	1	1	0	0	0	131	1
