= Demiyat Slambekov =

Kazakhstani footballer

Personal information
- Full name: Demiyat Kayratuly Slambekov
- Date of birth: 13 January 1997 (age 29)
- Place of birth: Almaty, Kazakhstan
- Height: 1.87 m (6 ft 2 in)
- Positions: Defender; midfielder

Team information
- Current team: Irtysh
- Number: 4

Youth career
- –2012: Kairat Almaty
- 2012–2014: Olé Brasil

Senior career*
Years	Team	Apps	(Gls)
2015–2016	Bayterek	43	(0)
2017	Okzhetpes	1	(0)
2017–2018	Zhetysu	6	(0)
2018	→ Zhetysu-2 (loan)	26	(0)
2019	Stumbras-2	8	(3)
2019	Hegelmann Litauen	15	(3)
2020–2021	Aktobe	9	(0)
2021–2022	Aksu	11	(2)
2022–2023	Kaisar	24	(9)
2023–2025	Ulytau	53	(2)
2026	Kyzylzhar	11	(0)
2026–	Irtysh	11	(0)
- * Club domestic league appearances and goals as of 1 November 2026

Demiyat Kayratuly Slambekov (Kazakh: Демият Қайратұлы Сламбеков; born 13 January 1997) is a Kazakhstani footballer who plays as a defender or midfielder for Irtysh.

== Career ==
In 2012, Slambekov joined the youth academy of Brazilian side Olé Brasil.

Before the 2015 season, he signed for Bayterek in the Kazakhstani second division.

Before the 2017 season, Slambekov signed for Kazakhstani top flight club Okzhetpes, where he made 2 appearances and scored 0 goals. On 19 April 2017, he debuted for Okzhetpes during a 4–1 win over Makhtaaral.

In 2017, Slambekov signed for Zhetysu in the Kazakhstani second division, helping them earn promotion to the Kazakhstani top flight.

Before the 2019 season, he signed for Lithuanian second division team Stumbras-2, but left due to financial problems.

On 20 June 2019, he debuted for Hegelmann Litauen during a 4–1 win over Žalgiris-2. On 20 June 2019, Slambekov scored his first goal for Hegelmann Litauen during a 4–1 win over Žalgiris-2 from the halfway line.

In July 2021, Slambekov joined FK Aksu.
