= 1968 Soviet Class B =

Second League
- Season: 1968

1968 Soviet Class B was a Soviet football competition at the Soviet third tier.

== Russian Federation ==
=== Semifinal Group 1 ===
[Bryansk]

Pos	Team	Pld	W	D	L	GF	GA	GD	Pts
1	Dinamo Bryansk	3	3	0	0	4	1	+3	6
2	Spartak Kostroma	3	1	1	1	4	4	0	3
3	Zvezda Vyborg	3	1	1	1	3	3	0	3
4	Rybak Nakhodka	3	0	0	3	2	5	−3	0

=== Semifinal Group 2 ===
[Rybinsk]

Pos	Team	Pld	W	D	L	GF	GA	GD	Pts
1	Narzan Kislovodsk	3	2	1	0	6	4	+2	5
2	Molniya Moskva	3	1	2	0	6	3	+3	4
3	Saturn Rybinsk	3	1	1	1	2	2	0	3
4	Trudoviye Rzezrvy Kursk	3	0	0	3	0	5	−5	0

=== Semifinal Group 3 ===
[Pyatigorsk]

Pos	Team	Pld	W	D	L	GF	GA	GD	Pts
1	Mashuk Pyatigorsk	3	3	0	0	4	0	+4	6
2	Urozhai Maykop	3	2	0	1	7	2	+5	4
3	Sever Murmansk	3	1	0	2	3	6	−3	2
4	Olimp Fryazino	3	0	0	3	1	7	−6	0

=== Semifinal Group 4 ===
[Sverdlovsk]

Pos	Team	Pld	W	D	L	GF	GA	GD	Pts
1	Kalininets Sverdlovsk	3	2	1	0	6	2	+4	5
2	Dinamo-d Leningrad	3	2	0	1	5	4	+1	4
3	Shakhtyor Kiselyovsk	3	0	2	1	4	5	−1	2
4	Torpedo Podolsk	3	0	1	2	2	6	−4	1

=== Semifinal Group 5 ===
[Belgorod]

Pos	Team	Pld	W	D	L	GF	GA	GD	Pts
1	Spartak Belgorod	3	3	0	0	9	2	+7	6
2	Cement Novorossiysk	3	2	0	1	5	3	+2	4
3	Krylya Sovetov-3 Moskva	3	1	0	2	4	8	−4	2
4	Khimik Salavat	3	0	0	3	2	7	−5	0

=== Semifinal Group 6 ===
[Prokopyevsk]

Pos	Team	Pld	W	D	L	GF	GA	GD	Pts
1	Shakhtyor Prokopyevsk	3	2	1	0	2	0	+2	5
2	Oka Stupino	3	1	1	1	5	5	0	3
3	Zauralets Kurgan	3	1	0	2	3	4	−1	2
4	Metallurg Cherepovets	3	0	2	1	2	3	−1	2

=== Final group ===
[Nov 4-17, Pyatigorsk]

Pos	Team	Pld	W	D	L	GF	GA	GD	Pts
1	Mashuk Pyatigorsk	5	3	2	0	8	3	+5	8
2	Kalininets Sverdlovsk	5	3	0	2	5	3	+2	6
3	Spartak Belgorod	5	1	3	1	6	4	+2	5
4	Dinamo Bryansk	5	1	3	1	2	2	0	5
5	Narzan Kislovodsk	5	0	3	2	1	4	−3	3
6	Shakhtyor Prokopyevsk	5	1	1	3	5	11	−6	3

== Ukraine ==
=== Final Group ===
[Oct 25 – Nov 7, Ternopol, Chernovtsy]

Pos	Team	Pld	W	D	L	GF	GA	GD	Pts
1	Avangard Ternopol	7	4	3	0	10	2	+8	11
2	Bukovina Chernovtsy	7	4	3	0	11	4	+7	11
3	Shakhtyor Kadiyevka	7	2	4	1	5	4	+1	8
4	Desna Chernigov	7	3	2	2	6	6	0	8
5	Dinamo Khmelnitskiy	7	3	1	3	8	7	+1	7
6	Spartak Sumy	7	2	2	3	3	4	−1	6
7	Lokomotiv Donetsk	7	1	2	4	5	8	−3	4
8	Shakhtyor Alexandria	7	0	1	6	3	16	−13	1

Match for 1st place

Avangard Ternopol  2-0  Bukovina Chernovtsy

== Kazakhstan ==
Pos	Team	Pld	W	D	L	GF	GA	GD	Pts
1	Yenbek Jezkazgan	40	27	10	3	70	24	+46	66 (Note: 2 bonus points awarded?)
2	ADK Alma-Ata	40	27	10	3	83	20	+63	64
3	Metallurg Temirtau	40	27	9	4	69	14	+55	63
4	Cementnik Semipalatinsk	40	28	6	6	79	18	+61	62
5	Traktor Pavlodar (Note: Irtysh Pavlodar changed name to Traktor.)	40	25	6	9	58	21	+37	56
6	Dinamo Tselinograd	40	23	7	10	66	40	+26	53
7	Energetik Jambul (Note: Voskhod Jambul changed name to Energetik.)	40	18	14	8	55	32	+23	50
8	Leninogorets Leninogorsk	40	16	8	16	41	61	−20	40
9	Avtomobilist Kustanay	40	13	14	13	32	36	−4	40
10	Torpedo Kokchetav	40	12	11	17	45	59	−14	35
11	Uralets Uralsk	40	14	7	19	45	54	−9	35
12	Irtysh Glubokoye	40	9	17	14	37	53	−16	35
13	Aktyubinets Aktyubinsk	40	11	13	16	29	48	−19	35
14	Metallurg Yermak	40	13	7	20	36	43	−7	33
15	Gornyak Kentau	40	11	9	20	39	66	−27	31
16	Stroitel Rudny	40	8	14	18	26	42	−16	30
17	Ugolshchik Shakhtinsk	40	9	11	20	21	37	−16	29
18	Avangard Petropavlovsk	40	7	11	22	30	54	−24	25
19	Phosphorite Karatau	40	6	13	21	22	64	−42	25
20	Aray Stepnogorsk	40	6	10	24	26	56	−30	22
21	Avtomobilist Kzil-Orda	40	3	7	30	17	84	−67	13

Notes:

Match for 1st place

Yenbek Jezkazgan  2-0  ADK Alma-Ata

== Central Asia ==
Pos	Rep	Team	Pld	W	D	L	GF	GA	GD	Pts
1	UZB	Sverdlovets Tashkent Region	42	25	12	5	64	24	+40	62
2	UZB	Ok Oltyn Andizhan Region	42	22	11	9	66	37	+29	55
3	UZB	Samarkand (Note: Sogdiana Samarkand changed name to Samarkand.)	42	19	16	7	55	38	+17	54
4	TKM	Irrigator Charjou (Note: Zahmet Charjou changed name to Irrigator.)	42	22	9	11	64	37	+27	53
5	UZB	Yangiyer (Note: Tselinnik Yangiyer changed name to Yangiyer.)	42	17	19	6	47	27	+20	53
6	UZB	TashAvtoMash Tashkent	42	18	15	9	72	44	+28	51
7	KGZ	Alay Osh	42	21	9	12	57	37	+20	51
8	UZB	Khimik Chirchik	42	18	13	11	53	44	+9	49
9	UZB	Andizhan (Note: Spartak Andizhan changed name to Andizhan.)	42	18	10	14	49	36	+13	46
10	TJK	Pahtakor Kurgan-Tyube	42	14	16	12	45	38	+7	44
11	UZB	Pahtaaral Gulistan	42	13	16	13	50	45	+5	42
12	UZB	Akkurgan Tashkent Region	42	15	12	15	38	37	+1	42
13	UZB	Metallurg Almalyk	42	12	16	14	38	39	−1	40
14	TJK	Vakhsh Nurek	42	16	8	18	36	51	−15	40
15	UZB	Fakel Buhara	42	13	10	19	40	52	−12	36
16	TJK	Abreshimchi Leninabad	42	11	14	17	31	47	−16	36
17	KGZ	Khimik Kalinin District	42	13	7	22	35	42	−7	33
18	TKM	Kara-Kum Mary (Note: Murgab Mary changed name to Kara-Kum.)	42	12	8	22	31	55	−24	32
19	UZB	Mehnat Kokand	42	9	13	20	23	50	−27	31
20	UZB	Kolkhoz Narimanova Bagat	42	8	9	25	42	74	−32	25
21	UZB	Bekabad	42	8	9	25	34	86	−52	25
22	UZB	Chigarachi Termez	42	7	10	25	29	59	−30	24

Source: rsssf.com
