= Nemanja Mićević =

Serbian football player

Personal information
- Full name: Nemanja Mićević
- Date of birth: 28 January 1999 (age 27)
- Place of birth: Užice, FR Yugoslavia
- Height: 1.90 m (6 ft 3 in)
- Position: Centre-back

Team information
- Current team: Altai
- Number: 4

Youth career
- –2017: OFK Beograd

Senior career*
Years	Team	Apps	(Gls)
2017–2022	Mladost Lučani	85	(4)
2023	Talleres	0	(0)
2023–2025	Teplice	69	(3)
2025–2026	Radnički Niš	5	(0)
2026–	Altai	27	(0)

International career^{‡}
2020	Serbia U21	3	(0)
2021–	Serbia	1	(0)
- * Club domestic league appearances and goals as of 1 November 2026 ‡ National team caps and goals as of 21:12, 25 January 2021 (UTC)

Nemanja Mićević (Serbian Cyrillic: Немања Мићевић; born 28 January 1999) is a Serbian professional footballer who plays as a centre-back for Kazakhstan Premier League club Altai.

Mićević made his debut for Serbia in a January 2021 friendly match away against the Dominican Republic
