= FC Altai =

Kazakhstani football club

Altai
- Full name: Football Club Altai футбол клубы Алтай
- Founded: 6 January 2016; 10 years ago
- Ground: Vostok Stadium, Oskemen
- Capacity: 8,500
- Owner: Sultanbek Muratbayev
- President: Serdar Muratbayev
- Head coach: Vakhid Masudov
- League: Kazakhstan Premier League
- 2025: First Division, 3rd of 14 (promoted)
- Website: altai-fc.kz
Home colours	Away colours

FC Altai (Kazakh: футбол клубы Алтай) is a Kazakh professional football club based in Oskemen. They play in the Kazakhstan Premier League, the top level of Kazakh football.

== History ==
The club was founded in January 2016 from the merger of two clubs, Spartak Semey and Vostok that had been founded in 1964 and 1963, respectively. It is a professional team and plays in the First Division. In 2025, Altai secure promotion to Kazakhstan Premier League for the first time in their history from next season after finish third place.

=== Domestic history ===
Season	League	Level	Pos	Pld	W	D	L	For	Against	Points	Domestic Cup	Top goalscorer
2016	First League	2nd	2	28	17	7	4	49	17	58	Last 16	
2017	Second League	3rd	1	30	22	5	3	67	14	71		
2018	First League	2nd	4	33	18	8	7	56	28	62		
2019	First League	2nd	4	26	16	5	5	43	14	53		
2020	First League	2nd	7	12	2	3	7	10	18	9		
2021	Second League	3rd	9	22	7	3	12	43	47	24		
2022	Second League	3rd	4	22	12	2	8	34	27	38		
2023	Second League	3rd	4	20	10	2	8	36	33	32		
2024	First League	2nd	9	28	11	5	12	31	37	38	Group Stage – Group B, 2nd of 3	(Kazakhstan) Sergey Khizhnichenko (5 goals)
2025	First League	2nd	3	26	17	4	5	54	23	55	Preliminary round – Semi-finals	(Kazakhstan) Ibragim Dadaev (12 goals)
2026	Premier League	1st	TBD	30						0		

== Honours ==
- Kazakhstan First League
  - Runner-up (1): 2016
- Kazakhstan Second League
  - Winner (1): 2017

== Current squad ==
As of 1 August 2026

Note: Flags indicate national team as defined under FIFA eligibility rules; some limited exceptions apply. Players may hold more than one non-FIFA nationality.

No.	Pos.	Nation	Player
1	GK	KAZ	Anuar Sapargaliev
3	DF	NGR	Samuel Odeyobo
4	DF	SRB	Nemanja Mićević
5	DF	KAZ	Oraz Saylybaev
7	FW	KAZ	Gavril Kan
8	MF	KAZ	Almas Sapargaliev
9	DF	KAZ	Elisey Gorshunov
10	FW	KAZ	Adilet Omarbek
11	MF	KAZ	Ibragim Dadaev
15	DF	KAZ	Dmitriy Schmidt (captain)
16	FW	KAZ	Yunus Masudov
17	MF	KAZ	Zhannur Kukeev
18	MF	KAZ	Abylaykhan Nazymkhanov (on loan from Yelimay)
19	MF	KAZ	Zakhar Gultyaev

No.	Pos.	Nation	Player
21	MF	CRO	Nikola Jambor
22	MF	KAZ	Aslan Dzhanuzakov
23	DF	KAZ	Doszhan Kenzhegulov
25	GK	UKR	Danylo Kucher
29	FW	GEO	Elguja Lobjanidze
35	GK	KAZ	Abylkhair Aliakbar
45	FW	MKD	Darko Dodev
70	FW	KAZ	Denis Mitrofanov
77	FW	KAZ	Seif Popov
88	DF	KAZ	Sergey Ivanov
91	FW	KAZ	Sergey Khizhnichenko (Vice-captain)
98	FW	BLR	Dmitry Podstrelov
99	FW	SRB	Dragan Stoisavljević
