= Samuel Odeyobo =

Nigerian footballer

Personal information
- Date of birth: 28 September 1993 (age 33)
- Place of birth: Lagos, Nigeria
- Height: 1.87 m (6 ft 1 1/2 in)
- Position: Midfielder

Team information
- Current team: FC Altai
- Number: 3

Senior career*
Years	Team	Apps	(Gls)
2016–2017	Krumkachy Minsk	2	(0)
2017	Naftan Novopolotsk	15	(2)
2018	Granit Mikashevichi	28	(1)
2019–2020	Belshina Bobruisk	56	(1)
2021	Torpedo-BelAZ Zhodino	10	(0)
2022–2024	Hegelmann	89	(8)
2024–2025	Elimai	35	(3)
2026–	Altai	25	(1)
- * Club domestic league appearances and goals as of 1 November 2026

Samuel Odeyobo (born 28 September 1993) is a Nigerian professional footballer who plays for Kazakhstani club Altai.

== Career ==
Odeyobo came to Belarus in 2013. He was on a trial in Belarusian First League club Smolevichi-STI but couldn't sign a contract due to issues with the documents. He spent a few years playing at the amateur level before being recruited by Krumkachy Minsk in 2016.

=== FC Hegelmann ===
In February 2022 he signed with Lithuanian FC Hegelmann.
