= Dmitry Podstrelov =

Belarusian footballer

Personal information
- Full name: Dmitry Aleksandrovich Podstrelov
- Date of birth: 6 September 1998 (age 28)
- Place of birth: Mogilev, Belarus
- Height: 1.75 m (5 ft 9 in)
- Position: Forward

Team information
- Current team: Altai
- Number: 98

Youth career
- 2014–2015: Dnepr Mogilev

Senior career*
Years	Team	Apps	(Gls)
2015–2018	Dnepr Mogilev	39	(3)
2019	Dnyapro Mogilev	22	(4)
2020–2022	Shakhtyor Soligorsk	84	(13)
2023	Caspiy	13	(2)
2023	BATE Borisov	11	(3)
2024	Dinamo Minsk	26	(4)
2025	Partizani Tirana	17	(1)
2025–2026	Dinamo Minsk	17	(0)
2026–	Altai	17	(1)

International career^{‡}
2017	Belarus U19	2	(0)
2018–2019	Belarus U21	8	(1)
2020–2022	Belarus	14	(1)
- * Club domestic league appearances and goals as of 1 November 2026 ‡ National team caps and goals as of 20 November 2022

Dmitry Aleksandrovich Podstrelov (Belarusian: Дзмітрый Аляксандравіч Падстрэлаў; Russian: Дмитрий Александрович Подстрелов; born 6 September 1998) is a Belarusian professional footballer who plays for Altai and the Belarus national team.

== International goal ==
Scores and results list Belarus' goal tally first.

No.	Date	Venue	Opponent	Score	Result	Competition
1.	26 February 2020	Vasil Levski National Stadium, Sofia, Bulgaria	Bulgaria	1–0	1–0	Friendly

== Honors ==
Shakhtyor Soligorsk

- Belarusian Premier League champion: 2020, 2021
- Belarusian Super Cup winner: 2021
