= Bakdaulet Zulfikarov =

Kazakhstani footballer

Personal information
- Full name: Bakdaulet Talgatuly Zulfikarov
- Date of birth: 11 March 2001 (age 25)
- Place of birth: Shymkent, Kazakhstan
- Height: 1.82 m (6 ft 0 in)
- Position: Forward

Team information
- Current team: Ulytau
- Number: 45

Youth career
- –2018: Kyran

Senior career*
Years	Team	Apps	(Gls)
2018	Kyran-M	12	(0)
2019	Akademia Ontustik-M	27	(7)
2020	Kyran	5	(2)
2020	→ Kyran-M	3	(1)
2021	Energetik-BGU Minsk	4	(1)
2022	Turan	6	(1)
2023–2024	Kaisar	28	(2)
2024	Caspiy	6	(0)
2025	Atyrau	8	(0)
2025	Turan	12	(2)
2026	Caspiy	11	(1)
2026–	Ulytau	16	(6)
- * Club domestic league appearances and goals as of 1 November 2026

Bakdaulet Talgatuly Zulfikarov (Kazakh: Бақдәулет Талғатұлы Зұлфықаров, romanized: Baqdäulet Talğatūly Zūlfyqarov; born 11 March 2001) is a Kazakhstani professional footballer who plays for Ulytau.
