= Yuriy Vakulko =

Ukrainian footballer

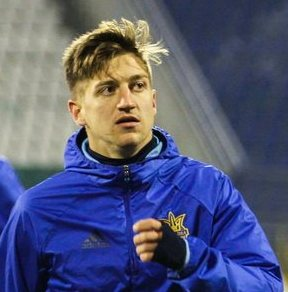
- Vakulko in 2016

Personal information
- Full name: Yuriy Mykolayovych Vakulko
- Date of birth: 10 November 1997 (age 29)
- Place of birth: Odesa, Ukraine
- Height: 1.74 m (5 ft 8 1/2 in)
- Position: Midfielder

Team information
- Current team: Ordabasy
- Number: 11

Senior career*
Years	Team	Apps	(Gls)
2014–2017	Dnipro	38	(2)
2018–2019	Partizan	2	(0)
2018–2019	→ Arsenal Kyiv (loan)	9	(0)
2019–2021	Dnipro-1	28	(0)
2021–2023	Riga	34	(3)
2023–2025	Kryvbas Kryvyi Rih	40	(0)
2025–	Ordabasy	34	(0)

International career
2012–2015	Ukraine U16	2	(0)
2015–2016	Ukraine U19	5	(0)
2016–2018	Ukraine U21	16	(2)
- * Club domestic league appearances and goals as of 20:37, 9 November 2026 (UTC)

Yuriy Mykolayovych Vakulko (Ukrainian: Юрій Миколайович Вакулко; born 10 November 1997) is a Ukrainian professional footballer who plays as a midfielder for Kazakhstan Premier League club Ordabasy.

== Club career ==
=== Dnipro ===
He made his debut for FC Dnipro against FC Volyn Lutsk on 24 July 2016 in the Ukrainian Premier League scoring one of the goals in a 5–0 win.

=== Partizan ===
On 23 January 2018, Vakulko signed with Serbian club Partizan Belgrade on a four-year contract.

=== Loan to Arsenal Kyiv ===
On 3 September 2018, Vakulko joined Ukraine Premier League club Arsenal Kyiv on loan.

=== Riga ===
In the summer of 2021, Vakulko moved to Latvian side Riga FC.

=== Kryvbas Kryvyi Rih ===
In the summer of 2023, he moved to Kryvbas Kryvyi Rih in the Ukrainian Premier League for two seasons. In June 2025 he left the club by mutual consent.

=== Ordabasy ===
In the summer of 2025, Vakulko signed for Ordabasy in the Kazakhstan Premier League.

== International career ==
After representing Ukraine at under-19 level, Vakulko became a regular at the under-21 level.

== Honours ==
Dnipro

- UEFA Europa League runner-up: 2014–15

Partizan

- Serbian Cup: 2017–18

Riga FC

- Latvian Higher League runner-up: 2022

Ordabasy

- Kazakhstan Premier League: 2026
- Kazakhstan Cup: 2026
