= FC Ordabasy =

Association football club in Kazakhstan

Ordabasy
- Full name: Football Club Ordabasy; Ордабасы футбол клубы
- Nicknames: Kök-aqtar ('Blue and White')
- Founded: 1949; 77 years ago
- Ground: Kazhimukan Munaitpasov Stadium; Shymkent, Kazakhstan
- Capacity: 25,000
- Chairman: Nurzhan Katayev
- Manager: Andrei Martin
- League: Kazakhstan Premier League
- 2026: Kazakhstan Premier League, 1st of 16 (champions)
- Website: fcordabasy.kz
| Home colours | Away colours |

FC Ordabasy (Kazakh: Ордабасы футбол клубы / Ordabasy futbol kluby) is a professional football club from Kazakhstan based at the Kazhimukan Munaitpasov Stadium in Shymkent. Ordabasy was formed in 1949, following the merger of two existing Kazakhstan Premier League sides, FC Zhiger and FC Tomiris.

== History ==
FC Dostyk was formed as the merger of FC Zhiger and FC Tomiris at the middle of 2000 season and then renamed FC Ordabasy before the start of 2003 season,

On 5 February 2017, Aleksei Petrushin replaced Bakhtiyar Bayseitov as the club's manager.

Between 2011 and 2022, they won two Kazakhstan Cups and one Kazakhstan Super Cup.

On 25 October 2026, Ordabasy were crowned Kazakhstan Premier League champions for the second time in the club's history. Ordabasy dropped points in a home match against Jenis (1–1), but the following day they secured the title thanks to a 2–2 draw between Kairat and Aktobe. With one round remaining, the Shymkent team had a four-point lead, putting them beyond the reach of their closest rival.

Ordabasy holds the history of both Zhiger and Tomiris:

=== Zhiger ===
- 1949 : Founded as Dinamo
- 1960 : Renamed Yenbek
- 1961 : Renamed Metallurg
- 1981 : Renamed Meliorator
- 1992 : Renamed Zhiger

=== Tomiris ===
- 1992 : Founded as SKIF-Arsenal
- 1993 : Renamed SKIF-Ordabasy
- 1998 : Renamed Tomiris
- 1999 : Renamed Sintez
- 2000 : Renamed Tomiris

=== Coaching staff ===
| Position | Staff |
|---|---|
| Head coach | Kirill Keker |
| Assistant manager | Oleg Nedashkovski |
| Fitness coach | Kuchma Aleksandr |

Last updated: 29 January 2025

=== Domestic history ===
| Season | League | | | | | | | | | Kazakhstan Cup | Top goalscorer | | Manager |
| Season | Div. | Pos. | Pl. | W | D | L | GS | GA | P | Kazakhstan Cup | Name | League | Manager |
|---|---|---|---|---|---|---|---|---|---|---|---|---|---|
| 2000 | 1st | 13th | 28 | 5 | 4 | 19 | 24 | 53 | 19 | | Seitzhan Baibossynov | 14 | (Kazakhstan) H. Shamil / (Kazakhstan) K. Kamalovich |
| 2001 | 1st | 16th | 32 | 4 | 9 | 19 | 28 | 58 | 21 | | Yuri Gura | 5 | (Kazakhstan) B. Isaevich |
| 2002 | 2nd | 3rd | 24 | 13 | 3 | 8 | 37 | 28 | 42 | | | 6 | (Kazakhstan) H. Shamil |
| 2003 | 1st | 6th | 32 | 15 | 4 | 13 | 33 | 29 | 49 | | S. Nazarov | 6 | (Ukraine) S. Shevchenko / (Kazakhstan) T. Khakimovich / (Kazakhstan) B. Daniyarovich |
| 2004 | 1st | 14th | 36 | 11 | 7 | 18 | 37 | 43 | 40 | | Alexander Krochmal | 9 | (Kazakhstan) B. Daniyarovich / (Kazakhstan) V. Linchevskiy / (Kazakhstan) F. Urdabaev / (Kazakhstan) B. Daniyarovich / |
| 2005 | 1st | 6th | 30 | 14 | 7 | 9 | 30 | 27 | 49 | | Aleksandr Krokhmal | 15 | (Kazakhstan) A. Vaganov |
| 2006 | 1st | 13th | 30 | 8 | 8 | 14 | 29 | 36 | 32 | | Murat Suyumagambetov | 13 | (Kazakhstan) A. Vaganov / (Kazakhstan) K. Kamalovich / (Kazakhstan) A. Suyumagambetov / (Kazakhstan) K. Kamalovich |
| 2007 | 1st | 9th | 30 | 9 | 11 | 10 | 28 | 29 | 38 | Runners-up | D. Djurdjevic | 7 | (Netherlands) M. Bragonje |
| 2008 | 1st | 12th | 30 | 7 | 9 | 14 | 25 | 44 | 30 | Round of 16 | Tanat Nusserbayev | 6 | (Kazakhstan) B. Baimukhammedov / (Serbia) J. Nikolić / (Kazakhstan) K. Kamalovich |
| 2009 | 1st | 7th | 26 | 10 | 6 | 10 | 33 | 30 | 36 | Second round | Dmitri Parkhachev | 9 | (Kazakhstan) V. Nikitenko |
| 2010 | 1st | 8th | 32 | 12 | 9 | 11 | 37 | 34 | 45 | Semi-finals | Daurenbek Tazhimbetov | 8 | (Belarus) A. Yurevich |
| 2011 | 1st | 6th | 32 | 11 | 10 | 11 | 41 | 36 | 28 | Winners | Daurenbek Tazhimbetov | 11 | (Belarus) A. Yurevich / (Ukraine) V. Pasulko |
| 2012 | 1st | 7th | 26 | 10 | 9 | 7 | 29 | 24 | 39 | Quarter-finals | Mansour Gueye / Daurenbek Tazhimbetov | 7 | (Ukraine) V. Pasulko |
| 2013 | 1st | 6th | 32 | 11 | 8 | 13 | 33 | 34 | 23 | Quarter-finals | Edin Junuzović | 12 | (Kazakhstan) V. Masudov |
| 2014 | 1st | 4th | 32 | 13 | 5 | 14 | 34 | 44 | 27 | Second round | Artem Kasyanov | 7 | (Ukraine) V. Pasulko / (Kazakhstan) K. Karakulov / (Lithuania) Širmelis |
| 2015 | 1st | 4th | 32 | 12 | 10 | 10 | 32 | 31 | 29 | Second round | Yerkebulan Tungyshbayev | 7 | (Lithuania) Širmelis / (Russia) V. Kumykov / (Kazakhstan) B. Baiseitov |
| 2016 | 1st | 4th | 32 | 13 | 9 | 10 | 41 | 44 | 48 | Quarter-finals | Alexander Geynrikh | 10 | (Kazakhstan) B. Baiseitov |
| 2017 | 1st | 3rd | 33 | 18 | 4 | 11 | 44 | 37 | 58 | Semi-finals | Tanat Nusserbayev | 9 | (Russia) Petrushin |
| 2018 | 1st | 4th | 33 | 13 | 7 | 13 | 38 | 44 | 46 | Quarter-finals | Abdoulaye Diakate | 7 | (Bulgaria) Dermendzhiev |
| 2019 | 1st | 3rd | 33 | 19 | 8 | 6 | 52 | 24 | 65 | Semi-finals | João Paulo | 15 | (Georgia (country)) Tskhadadze |
| 2020 | 1st | 5th | 20 | 9 | 4 | 7 | 27 | 26 | 31 | - | João Paulo | 12 | (Georgia (country)) Tskhadadze |
| 2021 | 1st | 5th | 26 | 10 | 8 | 8 | 36 | 35 | 38 | Group Stage | João Paulo | 8 | (Belarus) Sednyov |
| 2022 | 1st | 5th | 26 | 11 | 5 | 10 | 36 | 39 | 38 | Winners | Elkhan Astanov / Serge Nyuiadzi | 7 | (Belarus) Sednyov |
| 2023 | 1st | 1st | 26 | 18 | 4 | 4 | 48 | 21 | 58 | Runners-up | Askhat Tagybergen | 11 | (Belarus) Sednyov |
| 2024 | 1st | 4th | 24 | 12 | 6 | 6 | 36 | 24 | 42 | Quarterfinal | Jasurbek Yakhshiboev | 10 | (Belarus) Sednyov / (Kyrgyzstan) K. Keker |
| 2025 | 1st | 7th | 26 | 9 | 8 | 9 | 37 | 28 | 35 | Runners-up | Everton Moraes / Elkhan Astanov | 6 | (Moldova) Martin |
| 2026 | 1st | 1st | 30 | 21 | 5 | 4 | 59 | 23 | 68 | Winners | Bjørn Maars Johnsen | 14 | (Moldova) Martin |

=== Continental history ===
As of match played 10 July 2025

| Competition | GP | W | D | L | GF | GA | +/- |
|---|---|---|---|---|---|---|---|
| UEFA Champions League | 2 | 0 | 1 | 1 | 0 | 1 | –1 |
| UEFA Europa League | 15 | 3 | 6 | 6 | 15 | 18 | –3 |
| UEFA Conference League | 8 | 1 | 2 | 5 | 12 | 16 | –4 |
| Asian Cup Winners' Cup | 6 | 2 | 2 | 2 | 12 | 5 | +7 |
| Total | 31 | 6 | 11 | 14 | 39 | 40 | –1 |

| Season | Competition | Round | Club | Home | Away | Aggregate |
|---|---|---|---|---|---|---|
| 1996–97 | Asian Cup Winners' Cup | First round | (Turkmenistan) Turan Daşoguz | 5–1 | 0–0 | 5–1 |
| 1996–97 | Asian Cup Winners' Cup | Second round | (Kyrgyzstan) Semetei Kyzyl-Kiya | 7–2 | 0–1 | 7–3 |
| 1996–97 | Asian Cup Winners' Cup | Quarter-finals | (Iran) Esteghlal | 0–1 | 0–0 | 0–1 |
| 2012–13 | UEFA Europa League | 1Q | (Serbia) Jagodina | 0–0 | 1–0 | 1–0 |
| 2012–13 | UEFA Europa League | 2Q | (Norway) Rosenborg | 1–2 | 2–2 | 3–4 |
| 2015–16 | UEFA Europa League | 1Q | (Israel) Beitar Jerusalem | 0–0 | 1–2 | 1–2 |
| 2016–17 | UEFA Europa League | 1Q | (Serbia) Čukarički | 3–3 | 0–3 | 3–6 |
| 2017–18 | UEFA Europa League | 1Q | (Bosnia and Herzegovina) Široki Brijeg | 0–0 | 0–2 | 0–2 |
| 2019–20 | UEFA Europa League | 1Q | (Georgia (country)) Torpedo Kutaisi | 1–0 | 2–0 | 3–0 |
| 2019–20 | UEFA Europa League | 2Q | (Czech Republic) Mladá Boleslav | 2–3 | 1–1 | 3–4 |
| 2020–21 | UEFA Europa League | 1Q | (Romania) Botoșani | 1–2 | —N/a | —N/a |
| 2023–24 | UEFA Europa Conference League | 2Q | (Poland) Legia Warsaw | 2–2 | 2–3 | 4–5 |
| 2024–25 | UEFA Champions League | 1Q | (Moldova) Petrocub Hîncești | 0–0 | 0–1 | 0−1 |
| 2024–25 | UEFA Conference League | 2Q | (Luxembourg) Differdange 03 | 4–3 (a.e.t.) | 0–1 | 4−4 (4–3 p) |
| 2024–25 | UEFA Conference League | 3Q | (Armenia) Pyunik | 0–1 | 0–1 | 0−2 |
| 2025–26 | UEFA Conference League | 1Q | (Georgia (country)) Torpedo Kutaisi | 1–1 | 3–4 | 4−5 |
| 2027–28 | UEFA Champions League | 1Q | | | | |

== Honours ==
- Kazakhstan Premier League
  - Champions (2): 2023, 2026
- Kazakhstan First Division
  - Champions (2): 1998 (Tomiris), 2001 (Dostyk)
- Kazakhstan Cup
  - Winners (3): 2011, 2022, 2026
- Kazakhstan Super Cup
  - Winners (1): 2012

== Current squad ==
As of 1 August 2026

Note: Flags indicate national team as defined under FIFA eligibility rules; some limited exceptions apply. Players may hold more than one non-FIFA nationality.

| No. | Pos. | Nation | Player |
|---|---|---|---|
| 1 | GK | KAZ | Bekkhan Shayzada |
| 3 | DF | CMR | Guy Kilama |
| 4 | DF | KAZ | Sergey Keiler |
| 5 | DF | SRB | Nikola Antić |
| 6 | MF | KAZ | Nurbi Maratuly |
| 8 | DF | KAZ | Ular Zhaksybaev |
| 9 | FW | BRA | Everton Moraes |
| 10 | FW | KAZ | Elkhan Astanov (on loan from Astana) |
| 11 | MF | UKR | Yuriy Vakulko |
| 13 | GK | KAZ | Kazhymukan Tolepbergen |
| 14 | DF | KAZ | Ali Turganov |
| 15 | DF | KAZ | Zhasulan Amir |
| 16 | MF | ROU | Mihai Căpățînă |

| No. | Pos. | Nation | Player |
|---|---|---|---|
| 19 | FW | BRA | Léo Natel |
| 20 | FW | KAZ | Magzhan Toktybay |
| 21 | FW | KAZ | Birzhan Toktybay |
| 22 | DF | KAZ | Sultanbek Astanov |
| 23 | MF | KAZ | Abinur Nurymbet |
| 24 | GK | KAZ | Ayan Abdukhalyk |
| 25 | DF | KAZ | Serhiy Malyi |
| 27 | MF | KAZ | Nurdaulet Serik |
| 28 | FW | NOR | Bjørn Maars Johnsen |
| 44 | MF | FRA | Tidiane Keïta |
| 55 | DF | MKD | Aleksa Amanović |
| 77 | MF | GHA | David Abagna |

=== Out on loan ===
Note: Flags indicate national team as defined under FIFA eligibility rules; some limited exceptions apply. Players may hold more than one non-FIFA nationality.

| No. / Pos. / Nation / Player; - / MF / KAZ / Murodzhon Khalmatov (at Irtysh until 31 December 2026) | No. / Pos. / Nation / Player |

== See also ==
- Kazakhstani football clubs in European competitions
