= FC Ulytau =

Ulytau
- Full name: Football Club Ulytau; Ұлытау футбол клубы
- Founded: 1967; 59 years ago
- Ground: Metallurg Stadium, Jezkazgan
- Capacity: 2,500
- Chairman: Brakhim Kozhabayev
- Manager: Ivan Azovskiy
- League: Kazakhstan Premier League
- 2024: Kazakhstan First Division, 2nd (promoted)
- Website: fculytau.kz
Home colours	Away colours

FC Ulytau (Kazakh: Ұлытау футбол клубы) is a Kazakhstani professional football club based in Jezkazgan. They were members of the Kazakhstan First Division and in 2024 were promoted to the Kazakhstan Premier League.

== Name changes ==
- 1967: Yenbek
- 1975: Gornyak
- 1980: Dzhezkazganets
- 1991: Metallurg
- 1992: Metallist
- 1993: Yenbek
- 1997: Ulytau
- 2001: Yenbek
- 2022: Ulytau

== Current squad ==
As of 1 August, 2026

Note: Flags indicate national team as defined under FIFA eligibility rules; some limited exceptions apply. Players may hold more than one non-FIFA nationality.

No.	Pos.	Nation	Player
1	GK	KAZ	Dmytro Nepohodov
2	DF	ESP	David Carmona
4	DF	KAZ	Maksim Chalkin
6	MF	KAZ	Kuandyk Nursultanov
7	MF	JPN	Kotaro Kishi
8	MF	GEO	Beka Vachiberadze
9	MF	KAZ	Rinat Serikkul
10	MF	KAZ	Abzal Taubay
11	FW	NCA	Ariagner Smith
12	DF	KAZ	Vadim Afanasenko
13	DF	KAZ	Aslan Akhmedov
14	MF	JPN	Hiroki Harada

No.	Pos.	Nation	Player
17	MF	KAZ	Bagdat Daniyarov
18	MF	CMR	Arthur Bougnone
21	FW	KAZ	Orken Nurali
22	FW	BLR	Ilya Chernyak
25	DF	UKR	Hlib Bukhal
28	DF	RUS	Georgi Bugulov (captain)
40	GK	KAZ	Stanislav Shcherbakov
45	FW	KAZ	Bakdaulet Zulfikarov
69	DF	KAZ	Daniel Maulenov
77	MF	KAZ	Magzhan Shauymbay
78	GK	KAZ	Timurbek Zakirov
90	MF	GHA	David Martin
