= 1999 Kazakhstan Cup final =

- Event: 1998–99 Kazakhstan Cup
| Kaisar-Hurricane | Vostok-Altyn |
| 1 | 1 |
- Kaisar-Hurricane won 2–0 on penalties
- Date: 16 July 1999
- Venue: Central Stadium, Almaty
- Referee: Alexander Koulakov (Almaty)
- Attendance: 2,500

The 1999 Kazakhstan Cup final was the seventh final of the Kazakhstan Cup. The match was contested by Kaisar-Hurricane and Vostok-Altyn at Central Stadium in Almaty. The match was played on 16 July 1999 and was the final match of the competition.

== Background ==
Kaisar-Hurricane played their second consecutive Kazakhstan Cup final after losing their previous final 2–1 to Irtysh. Meanwhile, Vostok-Altyn played their third Kazakhstan Cup final. In their previous final appearances, they have won against Aktyubinets (1994 final, 1–0) and have lost to Kairat (1997 final, 2–0).

Kaisar-Hurricane and Vostok-Altyn played twice during the league season. In the first game on 20 July 1998, Vostok-Altyn won 2–0 on Vostok Stadium with Aleksandr Antropov and Vladimir Kashtanov scoring the goals. On 4 August 1998, Kaisar-Hurricane won 2–0 with goals from Andrei Vaganov and Azamat Niyazymbetov.

== Route to the Final ==
=== Kaisar-Hurricane ===
| Round | Opposition | Score |
|---|---|---|
| FR | Khimik | 3–4(2–1 (A) / 3–1 (H)) |
| QF | Yelimay | 2–6 (1–2 (A) / 4–1 (H)) |
| SF | Batyr | 7–1 (3–1 (H) / 0–4 (A)) |
Key: (h) = Home venue; (a) = Away venue; (n) = Neutral venue.

=== Vostok-Altyn ===
| Round | Opposition | Score |
|---|---|---|
| FR | Did not participate | Not played |
| QF | Naryn | 0–8 (0–1 (A) / 7–0 (H)) |
| SF | CSKA-Kairat | 1–4 (0–1 (A) / 3–1 (H)) |
Key: (h) = Home venue; (a) = Away venue; (n) = Neutral venue.

== Match ==
=== Details ===
16 Jule 1999

| Kaisar-Hurricane | 1–1 | Vostok-Altyn |
|---|---|---|
| Esmuratov 80' | Report | Antropov 82' |
Penalties
| Kitsak (penalty scored); Sklyarov (penalty missed); Akhmedov (penalty scored) | 2–0 | (penalty missed) Evteev; (penalty missed) Filimonov; (penalty missed) Afelchenko; (penalty missed) Sinychkov |

Central Stadium, Almaty
Attendance: 2,500
Referee: Alexander Koulakov (Almaty)

| GK | (Kazakhstan) Oleg Voskoboynikov |
| DF | (Kazakhstan) Andrei Tetushkin |
| DF | (Kazakhstan) Kalandar Akhmedov |
| DF | (Kazakhstan) Sultan Abildayev | (yellow card) 55' | (substituted off) 83' |
| DF | (Kazakhstan) Marat Esmuratov | (yellow card) 59' |
| MF | (Kazakhstan) Vitali Kitsak |
| MF | (Kazakhstan) Aleksandr Sklyarov |
| MF | (Kazakhstan) Dmitri Yurist |
| FW | (Kazakhstan) Azamat Niyazymbetov | | (substituted off) 58' |
| FW | (Kazakhstan) Nurken Mazbayev |
| FW | (Russia) Rakhman Asukhanov | | (substituted off) 73' |
Substitutes:
| GK | (Kazakhstan) Gani Atakhanov |
| DF | (Ukraine) Oleg Timets |
| DF | (Kazakhstan) Marat Sarsenov |
| MF | (Kazakhstan) Sergei Tagiev | | (substituted on) 83' |
| FW | (Ukraine) Vladislav Mankuta | | (substituted on) 73' |
| FW | (Kazakhstan) Vladimir Loginov | | (substituted on) 58' |
| FW | (Kazakhstan) Serik Koshkarov |
Manager:
(Kazakhstan) Abil Kalymbetov

| GK | (Turkmenistan) Aleksandr Korobko |
| DF | (Kazakhstan) Igor Chesnokov | (substituted off) 78' |
| DF | (Russia) Aleksei Titenkov | (substituted off) 86' |
| DF | (Kazakhstan) Pavel Evteev |
| DF | (Kazakhstan) Aleksandr Moskalenko |
| MF | (Ukraine) Vitali Buleyko |
| MF | (Russia) Aleksei Sinyuchkov |
| MF | (Kazakhstan) Andrei Barsukov | (substituted off) 110' |
| MF | (Kazakhstan) Maksim Samchenko | (yellow card) 8' |
| FW | (Kazakhstan) Andrei Afelchenko |
| FW | (Kazakhstan) Aleksandr Antropov |
Substitutes:
| GK | (Kazakhstan) Aleksandr Ganzhenko |
| DF | (Kazakhstan) Igor Kiselev |
| MF | (Kazakhstan) Sergei Saliy |
| FW | (Kazakhstan) Aleksandr Igumnov | (substituted on) 78' |
| FW | (Kazakhstan) Sergei Obryadov | (substituted on) 86' |
| FW | (Russia) Vladimir Filimonov | (substituted on) 110' |
Manager:
(Russia) Valeri Zhuravlyov

Match officials

- Assistant referees:

Man of the match

Match rules

- 90 minutes.
- 30 minutes of extra-time if necessary.
- Penalty shoot-out if scores still level.
- Seven named substitutes.
- Maximum of three substitutions.
