= 1999–2000 Kazakhstan Cup =

1999–00 Kazakhstan Cup
Tournament details
- Country: Kazakhstan
- Teams: 16

Final positions
- Champions: Kairat
- Runners-up: Access-Golden Grain

Tournament statistics
- Matches played: 26
- Goals scored: 72 (2.77 per match)
- Top goal scorer(s): Rejepmyrat Agabayew (Kairat) 5 Nilton Pereira Mendes (Irtysh) 5

The 1999–00 Kazakhstan Cup is the eighth season of the Kazakhstan Cup, the annual nationwide football cup competition of Kazakhstan since the independence of the country. The competition begins on 11 May 1999, and will end with the final in Jule 2000. Kaisar-Hurricane are the defending champions, having won their first cup in the 1998-99 competition.

== First round ==
11 May 1999	Batyr	(w/o)	CSKA-Kairat

11 May 1999	Vostok-Altyn	4-1	Zhetysu	Vostok Stadium, Oskemen
	Barsukov 19'; Obryadov 36'; Igumnov 45'; Titenkov 81'		Kolesnikov 67'	Attendance: 2500; Referee: Gennady Kamchatny (Almaty)

1 June 1999	Zhetysu	0-0 (1-4 agg.)	Vostok-Altyn	Zhetysu Stadium, Taldykorgan
				Attendance: 7000; Referee: Viktor Zayakin (Semey)

11 May 1999	Irtysh	3-0	Akmola	Central Stadium, Pavlodar
	Zubarev 51'; Mendes 70', 86'			Attendance: 7000; Referee: Sergei Kapanin (Karagandy)

1 June 1999	Akmola	2-2 (2-5 agg.)	Irtysh	Khimik Stadium, Stepnogorsk
	Zobnin 76'; Abdrashitov 84'		Mendes 12'; Baisufinov 25'	Attendance: 500; Referee: Rashit Khusnutdinov (Oral)

11 May 1999	Kaisar-Hurricane	2–0	Zhiger	G. Muratbayev Central Stadium, Kyzylorda
	Kitsak 9'; Loginov 15'			Attendance: 3200; Referee: Rashit Khusnutdinov (Oral)

1 June 1999	Zhiger	3-4 (3-6 agg.)	Kaisar-Hurricane	K. Munaitpasov Central Stadium, Kyzylorda
	Baybosynov 43' 64' (pen.); Omarbekov 87'		Mankuta 40'; Abildaev 55'; Tetushkin 67'; Sarsenov 68'	Attendance: 350; Referee: Abai Dyusenov (Turkestan)

11 May 1999	Access-Golden Grain	0-0	Zhenis	Avangard Stadium, Petropavl
				Attendance: 5000; Referee: Edigen Yumashev (Almaty)

1 June 1999	Zhenis	0-1 (0-1 agg.)	Access-Golden Grain	Lokomotiv Stadium, Astana
			Esmagambetov 64'	Attendance: 3500; Referee: Marat Ospanov (Kokshetau)

11 May 1999	AES-Yelimay	2-1	Tomiris	Spartak Stadium, Semey
	Pinchukov 81'; Khachaturyan 84'		Musatayev 90'	Attendance: 4000; Referee: Nikolai Sidorov (Pavlodar)

1 June 1999	Tomiris	3-0 (4-2 agg.)	AES-Yelimay	K. Munaitpasov Central Stadium, Shymkent
	Urdabayev 1'; Vanin 5'; Musatayev 80' (pen.)			Attendance: 5000; Referee: Sergei Ufimtsev (Almaty)

11 May 1999	Taraz	1-0	Tobol	Central Stadium, Taraz
	Nurbayev 66'			Attendance: 4000; Referee: Kurmanbek Urdabayev (Shymkent)

1 June 1999	Tobol	(w/o) (+/- agg.)	Taraz

11 May 1999	Shakhter-Ispat-Karmet	0-0	Kairat	Shakhter Stadium, Karagandy
				Attendance: 3000; Referee: Sergei Tsaregradskiy (Semey)

1 June 1999	Kairat	2-0 (2-0 agg.)	Shakhter-Ispat-Karmet	KazGAU Stadium, Almaty
	Vorogovskiy 8'; Agabayew 10'			Attendance: 2500; Referee: Kurmanbek Urdabayev (Shymkent)

== Quarter-finals ==
1 October 1999	Tobol	0-1	Access-Golden Grain	Central Stadium, Kostanay
			Kalabukhin 72'	Attendance: 3000; Referee: Sergei Kapanin (Karagandy)

7 October 1999	Access-Golden Grain	2-1 (3-1 agg.)	Tobol	Avangard Stadium, Petropavl
	Zakharov 55'; Pak 67'		Vishnichenko 24'	Attendance: 8500; Referee: Aleksandr Borisov (Semey)

1 November 1999	Vostok-Altyn	3-1	Batyr	Vostok Stadium, Oskemen
	Evteev 18'; Obryadov 31'; Muravyov 76'		Goryachev 33' (pen.)	Attendance: 2000; Referee: Vladimir Galkin (Almaty)

5 November 1999	Batyr	1-0 (2-3 agg.)	Vostok-Altyn	Shakhter Stadium, Ekibastuz
	Baisufinov 72'			Attendance: 500; Referee: Sergei Kapanin (Karagandy)

4 May 2000	Kairat	3-0	Kaisar-Hurricane	KazGAU Stadium, Almaty
	Agabayew 37'; Tarasov 38', 51'			Attendance: 2000; Referee: Bagdat Tuseev (Semey)

17 May 2000	Kaisar-Hurricane	2-1 (2-4 agg.)	Kairat	G. Muratbayev Central Stadium, Kyzylorda
	Avakyants 4'; Loginov 61'		Litvinenko 55'	Attendance: 3000; Referee: Aleksandr Borisov (Semey)

4 May 2000	Tomiris	1–2	Irtysh	K. Munaitpasov Central Stadium, Shymkent
	Galich 59'		Chizhikov 54'; Klishin 57'	Attendance: 1500; Referee: Vasili Yurchenko (Aktobe)

17 May 2000	Irtysh	0-1 (2-2 agg.)	Tomiris	Central Stadium, Pavlodar
			Korzhakov 70'	Attendance: 4000; Referee: Sergei Tsaregradskiy (Semey)

== Semi-finals ==
30 May 2000	Irtysh	3-0	Access-Golden Grain	Central Stadium, Pavlodar
	Mendes 1', 90'; Klishin 18'			Attendance: 6000; Referee: Vasili Yurchenko (Aktobe)

22 June 2000	Access-Golden Grain	6-0 (6-3 agg.)	Irtysh	Avangard Stadium, Petropavl
	Avdeev 7'; Agayew 20'; Zakharov 25', 37'; Babenko 45'; Usmanov 88'			Attendance: 9500; Referee: Sergei Tsaregradskiy (Semey)

31 May 2000	Vostok-Altyn	2-2	Kairat	Vostok Stadium, Oskemen
	Chesnokov 53' (pen.); Saliy 85'		Ivanov 9'; Agabayew 28'	Attendance: 2000; Referee: Gennady Zhukovskiy (Aktobe)

22 June 2000	Kairat	4–0 (6-2 agg.)	Vostok-Altyn	KazGAU Stadium, Almaty
	Agabayew 5', 35'; Tarasov 71'; Ivanov 88'			Attendance: 4000; Referee: Vasili Yurchenko (Aktobe)

== Final ==
6 Jule 2000

Kairat	5–0	Access-Golden Grain
Ivanov 11'; Litvinenko 20', 90'; Khamidullov 63' (pen.); Tarasov 69'

K. Munaitpasov Stadium, Astana
Attendance: 7500
Referee: Aleksandr Borisov (Semey)
