= 1998–99 Kazakhstan Cup =

Tournament details
- Country: Kazakhstan
- Teams: 14

Final positions
- Champions: Kaisar-Hurricane
- Runners-up: Vostok-Altyn

Tournament statistics
- Matches played: 25
- Goals scored: 79 (3.16 per match)
- Top goal scorer: Aleksandr Antropov (Vostok-Altyn) 6

The 1998–99 Kazakhstan Cup is the seventh season of the Kazakhstan Cup, the annual nationwide football cup competition of Kazakhstan since the independence of the country. The competition began on 6 May 1998 and ended with the final on 16 July 1999. Irtysh are the defending champions, having won their first cup in the 1997–98 competition.

== First round ==
6 May 1998	Irtysh	4-1	Zhiger	Central Stadium, Pavlodar
	Kalabukhin 25'; Asukhanov 31'; Antonov 86', 88'		Dinaev 85'	Attendance: 1100; Referee: Aleksandr Borisov (Semey)

28 May 1998	Zhiger	1-2 (2-6 agg.)	Irtysh	K. Munaitpasov Central Stadium, Shymkent
	Bektemirov 81' (pen.)		Mirzabayev 46'; Asukhanov 72'	Attendance: 200; Referee: Kurmanbek Urdabayev (Shymkent)

8 May 1998	Batyr	3-1	Taraz	Shakhter Stadium, Ekibastuz
	Makaev 25', 62', 65'		Tleshev 55'	Attendance: 6000; Referee: Sergei Rovenskikh (Almaty)

15 Jule 1998	Taraz	2-1 (3-4 agg.)	Batyr	Khimik Stadium, Taraz
	Tleshev 46'; Eleusinov 48'		Makaev 53'	Attendance: 4500; Referee: Edigen Yumashev (Almaty)

26 May 1998	Khimik	2–1	Kaisar-Hurricane	Khimik Stadium, Stepnogorsk
	Kravchenko 22'; Nurgaliyev 52'		Vaganov 43'	Attendance: 2000; Referee: Yuri Yaryshev (Pavlodar)

15 Jule 1998	Kaisar-Hurricane	3-1 (4-3 agg.)	Khimik	G. Muratbayev Central Stadium, Kyzylorda
	Loginov 21', 61'; Mazbayev 35'		Kravchenko 56'	Attendance: 2000; Referee: Gennady Zhukovskiy (Khromtau)

28 May 1998	Nasha Kompaniya	0-1	Yelimay	Lokomotiv Stadium, Astana
			Bogomolov 24'	Attendance: 500; Referee: Grigoriy Sysoev (Oskemen)

15 Jule 1998	Yelimay	6-0 (7-0 agg.)	Nasha Kompaniya	Spartak Stadium, Semey
	Litvinenko 34', 70'; Aubakirov 39', 43'; Bogomolov 73'; Karpovich 88'			Attendance: 3000; Referee: Vladimir Galkin (Almaty)

28 May 1998	Shakhter-Ispat-Karmet	1-0	Bulat	Central Stadium, Saran
	Bobrov 46'			Attendance: 500; Referee: Bagdat Tuseyev (Semey)

15 Jule 1998	Bulat	2-2 (2-3 agg.)	Shakhter-Ispat-Karmet	Metallurg Stadium, Temirtau
	Novozhilov 24', 70'		Imankulov 64'; Salimov 72' (pen.)	Attendance: 1000; Referee: Abai Dyusenov (Turkestan)

28 May 1998	CSKA-Kairat	4-0	Astana	Central Stadium, Almaty
	Nisanbayev 15'; Zheilitbayev 31'; Rakhimbayev 35'; Ensebayev 44'			Attendance: 2000; Referee: Sergei Tsaregradskiy (Semey)

15 Jule 1998	Astana	1-1 (1-5 agg.)	CSKA-Kairat	Lokomotiv Stadium, Astana
	Zvonarenko 60'		Tarasov 87'	Attendance: 1000; Referee: Andrei Usov (Semey)

== Quarter-finals ==
28 May 1998	Naryn	0-1	Vostok-Altyn	P. Atoyan Stadium, Oral
			Antropov 88'	Attendance: 1000; Referee: Vladimir Galkin (Almaty)

24 Jule 1998	Vostok-Altyn	7-0 (8-0 agg.)	Naryn	Vostok Stadium, Oskemen
	Antropov 17', 39', 80'; Duzmambetov 19'; Gorokhovodatskiy 77', 84'; Yakupov 85'			Attendance: 1000; Referee: Nikolai Sidorov (Pavlodar)

26 Jule 1998	Yelimay	1-2	Kaisar-Hurricane	Spartak Stadium, Semey
	Aubakirov 88'		Loginov 51'; Gabdullin 65'	Attendance: 3000; Referee: Sergei Rovenskikh (Almaty)

9 August 1998	Kaisar-Hurricane	4-1 (6-2 agg.)	Yelimay	G. Muratbayev Central Stadium, Kyzylorda
	Turmagambetov 28', 63'; Gabdullin 41'; Mozgovoy 83'		Iskakov 66'	Attendance: 2000; Referee: Vladimir Makhno (Aktobe)

29 Jule 1998	Irtysh	1-1	CSKA-Kairat	Central Stadium, Pavlodar
	Antonov 45'		Ensebayev 88'	Attendance: 3500; Referee: Yevgeni Shkarin (Shymkent)

22 October 1998	CSKA-Kairat	3-0 (4-1 agg.)	Irtysh	Central Stadium, Almaty
	Baltiyev 35'; Urazbakhtin 42'; Luchkin 85'			Attendance: 1500; Referee: Aleksandr Borisov (Semey)

29 Jule 1998	Batyr	1–1	Shakhter-Ispat-Karmet	Shakhter Stadium, Ekibastuz
	Sisenov 86'		Lunev 22'	Attendance: 4500; Referee: Sergei Ufimtsev (Almaty)

9 October 1998	Shakhter-Ispat-Karmet	0-1 (1-2 agg.)	Batyr	Shakhter Stadium, Karagandy
			Barsukov 34'	Attendance: 350; Referee: Kurmanbek Urdabayev (Shymkent)

== Semi-finals ==
4 May 1999	CSKA-Kairat	0-1	Vostok-Altyn	Central Stadium, Almaty
			Samchenko 43'	Attendance: 2000; Referee: Vasili Yurchenko (Aktobe)

6 Jule 1999	Vostok-Altyn	3-1 (4-1 agg.)	CSKA-Kairat	Vostok Stadium, Oskemen
	Antropov 75'; Obryadov 85'; Evteev 89' (pen.)		Kuchma 87'	Attendance: 4200; Referee: Yuri Yaryshev (Pavlodar)

6 June 1999	Kaisar-Hurricane	3-1	Batyr	G. Muratbayev Central Stadium, Kyzylorda
	Koshkarov 12'; Mazbaev 33'; Loginov 56'		Goryachev 60'	Attendance: 4000; Referee: Abai Dyusenov (Turkestan)

17 June 1999	Batyr	0–4 (1-7 agg.)	Kaisar-Hurricane	Shakhter Stadium, Ekibastuz
			Koshkarov 21', 25', 60'; Loginov 41'	Attendance: 1500; Referee: Viktor Zayakin (Semey)

== Final ==
16 Jule 1999

Kaisar-Hurricane	1–1	Vostok-Altyn
Esmuratov 80'		Antropov 82'
Penalties
Kitsak (penalty scored); Sklyarov (penalty missed); Akhmedov (penalty scored)	2 – 0	Evteev (penalty missed); Filimonov (penalty missed); Afelchenko (penalty missed); Sinychkov (penalty missed)

Central Stadium, Almaty
Attendance: 2500
Referee: Aleksandr Kulakov (Almaty)
