= 1996–97 Kazakhstan Cup =

Tournament details
- Country: Kazakhstan
- Teams: 19

Final positions
- Champions: Kairat
- Runners-up: Vostok-Adil

Tournament statistics
- Matches played: 25
- Goals scored: 72 (2.88 per match)
- Top goal scorer: Eduard Glazunov (Munaishy) 6

The 1996–97 Kazakhstan Cup is the fifth season of the Kazakhstan Cup, the annual nationwide football cup competition of Kazakhstan since the independence of the country. The competition begins on 7 May 1996, and will end with the final in April 1997. Yelimay are the defending champions, having won their first cup in the 1995 competition.

== First round ==
7 May 1996	Kainar	(w/o) (+/- agg.)	Bulat

7 May 1996	Kairat	(w/o) (+/- agg.)	Tselinnik

7 May 1996	Gornyak	1-0	Tobol	Gornyak Stadium, Khromtau
	Kireev 4'			Attendance: 500; Referee: Isagali Bakbergen (Shymkent)

14 May 1996	Tobol	(w/o) (+/- agg.)	Gornyak

== Second round ==
6 May 1996	Shakhter	3–1	Aktobemunai	Shakhter Stadium, Karagandy
	Lunev 31'; Imankulov 83', 86'		Chesnakas 25'	Attendance: 1000; Referee: Andrei Usov (Semey)

7 June 1996	Aktobemunai	1-0 (2-3 agg.)	Shakhter	Central Stadium, Almaty
	Mankuta 53'			Attendance: 1000; Referee: Aleksandr Kulakov (Almaty)

7 May 1996	Zhiger	(w/o) (-/+ agg.)	Tobol

7 May 1996	Munaishy	3–0	Batyr	Munaishy Stadium, Aktau
	Glazunov 38', 55'; Logachev 87'			Attendance: 3500; Referee: Vasili Yurchenko (Aktobe)

9 June 1996	Batyr	1-1 (1-4 agg.)	Munaishy	Shakhter Stadium, Ekibastuz
	Zubarev 30'		Kuzin 66'	Attendance: 4000; Referee: Yuri Ivashkin (Karagandy)

7 May 1996	Kokshe	2-1	Enbek	Aisulu Stadium, Kokshetau
	Shanin 76'; Protsyuk 80'		Sirvidas 77'	Attendance: 2500; Referee: Aleksandr Pavlenko (Kostanay)

9 June 1996	Enbek	(w/o) (+/- agg.)	Kokshe

7 May 1996	SKIF-Ordabasy	0-0	Vostok-Adil	Kazhimukan Munaitpasov Stadium, Shymkent
				Attendance: 2500; Referee: Sergei Ufimtsev (Almaty)

14 May 1996	SKIF-Ordabasy	(w/o) (-/+ agg.)	Vostok-Adil

19 May 1996	Irtysh	4-2	Yelimay	Central Stadium, Pavlodar
	Antonov 8', 57'; Vishnyakov 78'; Litovchenko 89'		Familtsev (o.g.); Esmagambetov 68'	Attendance: 5000; Referee: Sergei Rovenskikh (Almaty)

6 June 1996	Yelimay	3-0 (5-4 agg.)	Irtysh	Spartak Stadium, Semey
	Fridental 18'; Aubakirov 22'; Litvinenko 26'			Attendance: 3000; Referee: Aleksandr Nikulin (Taldykorgan)

2 June 1996	Kainar	1-2	Kairat	Zhetysu Stadium, Taldykorgan
	Gorovenko 35'		Patsay 26'; Kadyrkulov 86'	Attendance: 2000; Referee: Anatoli Chernov (Semey)

20 June 1996	Kairat	4-3 (6-4 agg.)	Kainar	ODYUSSH №3, Panfilovo
	Zheilitbaev 11', 88'; Patsay 34'; Kadyrkulov 46'		Kolesnikov 8', 12'; Gorovenko 73'	Attendance: 1000; Referee: Abai Dyusenov (Turkestan)

7 June 1996	Taraz	1-2	Kaisar-Munai	Khimik Stadium, Taraz
	Mazbaev 82'		Avakyants 25'; Loginov 63'	Attendance: 4000; Referee: Yuri Mizrakhil (Almaty)

14 June 1996	Kaisar-Munai	(w/o) (+/- agg.)	Taraz

== Quarter-finals ==
21 June 1996	Enbek	2-1	Yelimay	Gornyak Stadium, Zhezkazgan
	Karzakov 66'; Linin 75'		Esmagambetov 40'	Attendance: 500; Referee: Vladimir Galkin (Almaty)

12 Jule 1996	Yelimay	3-1 (4-3 agg.)	Enbek	Spartak Stadium, Semey
	Ilyasov 36'; Markus 48'; Kubarev 58'		Bondar 57' (pen.)	Attendance: 8000; Referee: Isa Asanov (Temirtau)

24 Jule 1996	Munaishy	2-0	Tobol	Munaishy Stadium, Aktau
	Glazunov 35', 63'			Attendance: 3000; Referee: Gennady Zhukovskiy (Khromtau)

11 August 1996	Tobol	0-1 (0-3 agg.)	Munaishy	Trudovye Rezervy Stadium, Kostanay
			Rykov 44'	Attendance: 1000; Referee: Sergei Ufimtsev (Almaty)

6 August 1996	Kairat	4–1	Shakhter	Central Stadium, Almaty
	Zheilitbayev 12'; Patsay 16'; Nuftiev 32'; Syzdykov 41'		Kostandyan 20'	Attendance: 1000; Referee: Aleksandr Borisov (Semey)

11 August 1996	Shakhter	1-0 (2-4 agg.)	Kairat	Shakhter Stadium, Karagandy
	Kostandyan 46'			Attendance: 1000; Referee: Aleksandr Pavlenko (Kostanay)

13 August 1996	Kaisar-Munai	2–2	Vostok-Adil	G. Muratbayev Central Stadium, Kyzylorda
	Turmagambetov 81'; Kabaev 89'		Duzmambetov 15'; Obryadov 73'	Attendance: 3000; Referee: Abai Dyusenov (Turkestan)

17 August 1996	Vostok-Adil	1-1 (3-3 agg.)	Kaisar-Munai	Vostok Stadium, Oskemen
	Evteev 88'		Avakyants 38'	Attendance: 2000; Referee: Sergei Puzanov (Zhezkazgan)

== Semi-finals ==
16 November 1996	Vostok-Adil	0-1	Munaishy	Vostok Stadium, Oskemen
			Rykov 51'	Attendance: 1500; Referee: Marat Ospanov (Kokshetau)

20 November 1996	Munaishy	4-1 (5-1 agg.)	Vostok-Adil	Munaishy Stadium, Aktau
	Glazunov 22', 78'; Rykov 47'; Avdeev 60'		Duzmambetov 84'	Attendance: 1000; Referee: Yuri Mizrakhil (Almaty)

16 November 1996	Yelimay	2-1	Kairat	Spartak Stadium, Semey
	Ilyasov 63'; Aubakirov 74'		Kadyrkulov 37'	Attendance: 3000; Referee: Aleksandr Pavlenko (Kostanay)

20 November 1996	Kairat	1–1 (2-3 agg.)	Yelimay	Central Stadium, Almaty
	Rakhimbaev 7'		Markus 70'	Attendance: 3000; Referee: Aleksandr Nikulin (Taldykorgan)

== Final ==
25 November 1996

Munaishy	1–2	Yelimay
Rykov 2'		Esmagambetov 15'; Litvinenko 49'

Central Stadium, Almaty
Attendance: 4000
Referee: Vladimir Donde (Almaty)

26 April 1997

Kairat	2–0	Vostok
Klimov 36'; Nisanbaev 66'

Central Stadium, Almaty
Attendance: 2500
Referee: Kurmanbek Urdabayev (Shymkent)
