= 1997 Kazakhstan Cup final =

- Event: 1996–97 Kazakhstan Cup
Kairat	Vostok-Adil
2	0
- Date: 26 April 1997
- Venue: Central Stadium, Almaty
- Referee: Kurmanbek Urdabayev (Shymkent)
- Attendance: 2,500

The 1997 Kazakhstan Cup final was the fifth final of the Kazakhstan Cup. The match was contested by Kairat and Vostok-Adil at Central Stadium in Almaty. The match was played on 26 April 1997 and was the final match of the competition.

== Incident in the first final ==
The original final took place on 25 November 1996 at the Central Stadium in Almaty betweenMunaishy and Yelimay. Before the match, both teams reported about the requirement about resignation of the president of the Football Association of the Republic of Kazakhstan (FARK) Kuralbek Ordabayev and warned that the winner will accept the cup only in case of Ordabayev's resignation. The match was won by Yelimay with the score 2–1 who refused to accept the cup. These actions were interpreted as refusal of participation in the final which resulted in it being replayed. The new final was arranged between losing semi-finalists Kairat and Vostok-Adil on 26 April 1997.

== Background ==
Kairat and Vostok-Adil each entered their second Kazakhstan Cup final. In their first finals, Kairat beat Fosfor 5–1 in 1992 while Vostok-Adil beat Aktyubinets 1–0 in 1994.

Kairat and Vostok-Adil played each other three times during the league season. On 26 July 1996, Kairat won the first match 1–0 at the Central Stadium. On 13 September 1996, both sides played a 3–3 draw. In the third match, Vostok-Adil beat Kairat 2–0 with goals from Yevgeni Sveshnikov and Ruslan Duzmambetov.

== Route to the Final ==
=== Kairat ===
Round	Opposition	Score
SR	Kainar	4–6(1–2 (A)/ 4–3 (H) )
QF	Shakhter	4–2 (4–1 (H) / 1–0 (A))
SF	Yelimay	3–2 (2–1 (A) / 1–1 (H))
Key: (h) = Home venue; (a) = Away venue; (n) = Neutral venue.

=== Vostok-Adil ===
Round	Opposition	Score
SR	SKIF-Ordabasy	w/o (0–0 (A) / w/o (H))
QF	Kaisar-Munai	3–3 (2–2 (A) / 1–1 (H))
SF	Munaishy	1–5 (0–1 (H) / 4–1 (A))
Key: (h) = Home venue; (a) = Away venue; (n) = Neutral venue.

== Match ==
=== Details ===
26 April 1997

Kairat	2–0	Vostok-Adil
Klimov 36'; Nisanbayev 66'	Report

Central Stadium, Almaty
Attendance: 2,500
Referee: Kurmanbek Urdabayev (Shymkent)

GK	(Kazakhstan) Vadim Egoshkin
DF	(Kazakhstan) Bakhytzhan Ensebaev
DF	(Kazakhstan) Almas Kulshinbaev
DF	(Russia) Pavel Kolotovkin
DF	(Kazakhstan) Anuar Nisanbayev
MF	(Kazakhstan) Serik Zheilitbayev
MF	(Kazakhstan) Askhat Kadyrkulov	(substituted off) 55'
MF	(Kazakhstan) Aleksei Klishin	(substituted off) 86'
MF	(Kazakhstan) Aydyn Rakhimbayev	(yellow card) 20'	(substituted off) 84'
MF	(Kazakhstan) Dmitri Yurist	(substituted off) 61'
FW	(Kazakhstan) Sergei Klimov	(substituted off) 72'
Substitutes:
GK	(Kazakhstan) Naken Kyrykbayev
MF	(Kazakhstan) Roman Vorogovskiy	(substituted on) 84'
MF	(Kazakhstan) Sabit Apsenbetov	(substituted on) 61'
MF	(Kazakhstan) Manar Nuftiev	(substituted on) 72'
FW	(Kazakhstan) Roman Luchkin
FW	(Kazakhstan) Yevgeni Tarasov	(substituted on) 55'	(yellow card) 64'
FW	(Kazakhstan) Andrey Kucheryavykh	(substituted on) 86'
Manager:
(Kazakhstan) Vakhid Masudov

GK	(Kazakhstan) Nikolai Kalyabin
DF	(Kazakhstan) Oleg Lotov
DF	(Kazakhstan) Igor Chesnokov
DF	(Kazakhstan) Aleksandr Moskalenko
DF	(Kazakhstan) Vitali Kozhevnikov	(substituted off) 46'
MF	(Kazakhstan) Sergei Saliy	(substituted off) 64'
MF	(Kazakhstan) Yevgeni Sveshnikov
MF	(Kazakhstan) Pavel Evteev
MF	(Kazakhstan) Vladimir Kashtanov	(substituted off) 56'
FW	(Kazakhstan) Rafael Khamidullov
FW	(Kazakhstan) Ruslan Duzmambetov
Substitutes:
GK	(Kazakhstan) Aleksandr Ganzhenko
DF	(Kazakhstan) Igor Kiselev
DF	(Kazakhstan) Ilshat Mazidullin
MF	(Kazakhstan) Oleg Rylov	(substituted on) 46'
FW	(Kazakhstan) Sergei Gorokhovodatskiy
FW	(Kazakhstan) Aleksandr Antropov	(substituted on) 64'
FW	(Kazakhstan) Sergei Obryadov	(substituted on) 56'
Manager:
(Kazakhstan) Sergei Gorokhovodatskiy

Man of the match

Match rules

- 90 minutes.
- 30 minutes of extra-time if necessary.
- Penalty shoot-out if scores still level.
- Seven named substitutes.
- Maximum of five substitutions.
