= 1997–98 Kazakhstan Cup =

Tournament details
- Country: Kazakhstan
- Teams: 14

Final positions
- Champions: Irtysh
- Runners-up: Kaisar-Hurricane

Tournament statistics
- Matches played: 25
- Goals scored: 58 (2.32 per match)
- Top goal scorer: Konstantin Kotov (Astana) 4

The 1997–98 Kazakhstan Cup was the sixth season of the Kazakhstan Cup, the annual nationwide football cup competition of Kazakhstan since the independence of the country. The competition begins on 15 June 1997 and ended with the final on 10 June 1998. Kairat were the defending champions, having won their second cup in the 1996–97 competition.

== First round ==
15 June 1997	Vostok-Adil	0-1	Batyr	Vostok Stadium, Oskemen
			Kurganskiy 72'	Attendance: 1500; Referee: Sergei Ufimtsev (Almaty)

21 June 1997	Batyr	1-0 (2-0 agg.)	Vostok-Adil	Shakhter Stadium, Ekibastuz
	Glazunov 59'			Attendance: 5000; Referee: Kurmanbek Urdabayev (Shymkent)

15 June 1997	Avtomobilist	0-1	Bulat	Yunost Stadium, Shortandy
			Izotov 62'	Attendance: 500; Referee: Yuri Mizrakhil (Almaty)

21 June 1997	Bulat	0-2 (aet) (1-2 agg.)	Avtomobilist	Metallurg Stadium, Temirtau
			Protsyuk 12' (pen.); Morozov 96'	Attendance: 1500; Referee: Aleksandr Borisov (Semey)

15 June 1997	Astana	3–0	Yelimay	K. Munaitpasov Stadium, Astana
	Kenetayev 2'; Kotov 65'; Vishnichenko 69'			Attendance: 4000; Referee: Aleksandr Kulakov (Almaty)

21 June 1997	Yelimay	4-1 (4-4 agg.)	Astana	Spartak Stadium, Semey
	Litvinenko 42'; Surodeev 55'; Mukhadov 74'; Miroshnichenko 76'		Lisin 34'	Attendance: 5000; Referee: Gennady Zhukovskiy (Khromtau)

15 June 1997	CSKA-Kairat	5-0	Zhiger	Central Stadium, Almaty
	Kozhabergenov 50' (pen.); Baltiev 51'; Kadyrkulov 64', 74'; Nuftiev 90'			Attendance: 1500; Referee: Bagdat Tuseev (Semey)

21 June 1997	Zhiger	1-1 (1-6 agg.)	CSKA-Kairat	K. Munaitpasov Stadium, Shymkent
	Derbisbayev 57'		Urazbakhtin 55'	Attendance: 500; Referee: Vasili Yurchenko (Aktobe)

15 June 1997	Ulytau	0-2	Shakhter-Ispat-Karmet	Metallurg Stadium, Zhezkazgan
			R. Imankulov 7'; Butkov 49'	Attendance: 1500; Referee: Vladimir Donde (Almaty)

21 June 1997	Shakhter-Ispat-Karmet	3-0 (5-0 agg.)	Ulytau	Shakhter Stadium, Karagandy
	A. Abildayev 3' (pen.) 80'; R. Imankulov 30'			Attendance: 2000; Referee: Marat Ospanov (Kokshetau)

15 June 1997	Kaisar-Hurricane	1-0	Aktobe	G. Muratbayev Central Stadium, Kyzylorda
	Loginov 37'			Attendance: 3000; Referee: Yevgeni Shkarin (Shymkent)

21 June 1997	Aktobe	0-1 (0-2 agg.)	Kaisar-Hurricane	Central Stadium, Aktobe
			D. Imankulov 70'	Attendance: 500; Referee: Vitali Kagan (Semey)

== Quarter-finals ==
15 June 1997	Taraz	2-2	Irtysh	Khimik Stadium, Taraz
	Mazbayev 14'; Vaganov 72'		Antonov 5'; Kostandyan 66'	Attendance: 5000; Referee: Sergei Rovenskikh (Almaty)

20 June 1997	Irtysh	1-0 (3-2 agg.)	Taraz	Central Stadium, Pavlodar
	Abildayev 70'			Attendance: 4500; Referee: Nikolai Bublinskiy (Karagandy)

15 August 1997	Shakhter-Ispat-Karmet	1-6	Astana	Shakhter Stadium, Karagandy
	R. Imankulov 68'		Kucherbayev 38'; Basmanov 56'; Kotov 70' (pen.) 74', 89'; Polyakov 78'	Attendance: 2000; Referee: Sergei Rovenskikh (Almaty)

25 August 1997	Astana	1-0 (7-1 agg.)	Shakhter-Ispat-Karmet	K. Munaitpasov Stadium, Astana
	Basmanov 36'			Attendance: 2000; Referee: Vladimir Galkin (Almaty)

15 August 1997	Batyr	0-1	Kaisar-Hurricane	Shakhter Stadium, Ekibastuz
			Loginov 52'	Attendance: 4000; Referee: Sergei Ufimtsev (Almaty)

25 August 1997	Kaisar-Hurricane	3-1 (4-1 agg.)	Batyr	G. Muratbayev Central Stadium, Kyzylorda
	Mankuta 27'; Malikov 56'; Gabdullin 73'		Afelchenko 82' (pen.)	Attendance: 3000; Referee: Aleksandr Kulakov (Almaty)

8 October 1997	Avtomobilist	1–1	CSKA-Kairat	Yunost Stadium, Shortandy
	Nurgaliyev 60'		Urazbakhtin 85'	Attendance: 500; Referee: Marat Ospanov (Kokshetau)

12 October 1997	CSKA-Kairat	2-1 (3-2 agg.)	Avtomobilist	Central Stadium, Almaty
	Kozhabergenov 11'; Kadyrkulov 64'		Saginayev 60'	Attendance: 500; Referee: Vladimir Donde (Almaty)

== Semi-finals ==
10 May 1998	Kaisar-Hurricane	1-1	Astana	G. Muratbayev Central Stadium, Kyzylorda
	Abuov 85'		Zhitkov 90'	Attendance: 4000; Referee: Vasili Yurchenko (Aktobe)

23 May 1998	Astana	0-1 (1-2 agg.)	Kaisar-Hurricane	Lokomotiv Stadium, Astana
			Loginov 4'	Attendance: 2500; Referee: Aleksandr Kulakov (Almaty)

10 May 1998	CSKA-Kairat	0-1	Irtysh	Central Stadium, Almaty
			Kononov 44'	Attendance: 7000; Referee: Kurmanbek Urdabayev (Shymkent)

23 May 1998	Irtysh	1–0 (2-0 agg.)	CSKA-Kairat	Central Stadium, Pavlodar
	Malyshev 16'			Attendance: 5000; Referee: Aleksandr Borisov (Semey)

== Final ==
10 June 1998

Irtysh	2–1 (aet)	Kaisar-Hurricane
Antonov 50', 92'		Esmuratov 60'

Central Stadium, Almaty
Attendance: 3000
Referee: Yevgeni Shkarin (Shymkent)
