= 2000 Kazakhstan Premier League =

Kazakhstan Top Division
- Season: 2000
- Champions: Zhenis Astana
- Matches: 210
- Goals: 553 (2.63 per match)
- Top goalscorer: Mendes (21)

The 2000 Kazakhstan Top Division was the ninth season of the Top Division, now called the Kazakhstan Premier League, the highest football league competition in Kazakhstan.

== Teams ==
Following the conclusion of the previous season, no teams were relegated or promoted. Prior to the start of the season, Sintez became Tomiris, Access-Esil became Access-Golden Grain whilst Akmola moved back to Kokshetau.

During the middle of the season, Batyr withdrew due to financial problems, and Tomiris and Zhiger merged to form Dostyk. Dostyk were awarded the points that Tomiris had accumulated, whilst Zhiger were treated as having technical losses (0:3) in all remaining games.

=== Team overview ===
Locations of teams in the 2000 Kazakhstan Premier League

| Team | Location | Venue | Capacity |
|---|---|---|---|
| Access-Golden-Grain | Petropavl | Karasai Stadium | |
| Akmola | Kokshetau | Torpedo Stadium | |
| CSKA Almaty | Almaty | CSKA Stadium | |
| Dostyk | Shymkent | Kazhymukan Munaitpasov Stadium | |
| Irtysh-Bastau | Pavlodar | Central Stadium | |
| Kairat | Almaty | Central Stadium | |
| Kaisar-Hurricane | Kyzylorda | Gani Muratbayev Stadium | |
| Shakhter-Ispat-Karmet | Karaganda | Shakhter Stadium | |
| Taraz | Taraz | Central Stadium | |
| Tobol | Kostanay | Central Stadium | |
| Vostok-Altyn | Oskemen | Vostok Stadium | |
| Yelimay | Semey | Spartak Stadium | |
| Zhenis Astana | Astana | Kazhymukan Munaitpasov Stadium | |
| Zhetysu | Taldykorgan | Zhetysu Stadium | |
| Zhiger | Shymkent | Kazhymukan Munaitpasov Stadium | |

== League table ==
| Pos | Team | Pld | W | D | L | GF | GA | GD | Pts | Qualification |
|---|---|---|---|---|---|---|---|---|---|---|
| 1 | Zhenis Astana (C) | 28 | 24 | 2 | 2 | 69 | 20 | +49 | 74 | Qualification for the Golden match |
| 2 | Access-Golden Grain | 28 | 24 | 2 | 2 | 59 | 10 | +49 | 74 | Qualification for the Golden match |
| 3 | Irtysh Pavlodar | 28 | 19 | 3 | 6 | 50 | 26 | +24 | 60 | |
| 4 | Kairat | 28 | 18 | 6 | 4 | 48 | 17 | +31 | 60 | |
| 5 | Shakhter-Ispat-Karmet | 28 | 14 | 6 | 8 | 38 | 26 | +12 | 48 | |
| 6 | Kaisar-Hurricane | 28 | 12 | 7 | 9 | 36 | 23 | +13 | 43 | |
| 7 | Tobol | 28 | 13 | 3 | 12 | 42 | 39 | +3 | 42 | |
| 8 | Yelimay | 28 | 12 | 5 | 11 | 43 | 33 | +10 | 41 | |
| 9 | CSKA Kairat (Note: CSKA Kairat deducted 3 points for not paying participation fee.) | 28 | 12 | 3 | 13 | 39 | 35 | +4 | 36 | |
| 10 | Akmola | 28 | 8 | 5 | 15 | 25 | 34 | −9 | 29 | |
| 11 | Vostok Altyn | 28 | 8 | 4 | 16 | 30 | 45 | −15 | 28 | |
| 12 | Taraz | 28 | 7 | 5 | 16 | 22 | 47 | −25 | 26 | |
| 13 | Dostyk | 28 | 5 | 4 | 19 | 24 | 53 | −29 | 19 | |
| 14 | Zhetysu | 28 | 4 | 2 | 22 | 15 | 73 | −58 | 14 | |
| 15 | Zhiger | 28 | 1 | 1 | 26 | 13 | 72 | −59 | 4 | |

Source: kpfl.kz
Rules for classification: 1) points; 2) goal difference; 3) number of goals scored.
(C) Champions

=== Golden match ===
29 October 2000

| Zhenis Astana | 2-0 | Access-Golden Grain |
|---|---|---|
| Sepashvili 9'; Kornienko 86' (pen.) |

Central Stadium, Almaty
Attendance: 10,000
Referee: B.Tuseev

== Results ==
| Home \ Away | ACS | AKM | CSK | DOS | IRT | KRT | KSR | SHA | TAR | TOB | VOS | YEL | ZHN | ZHE | ZHI |
|---|---|---|---|---|---|---|---|---|---|---|---|---|---|---|---|
| Access-Golden Grain | | 2–0 | 3–0 | 2–0 | 3–0 | 2–0 | 1–0 | 2–1 | 4–0 | 2–0 | 1–0 | 2–2 | 3–1 | 5–0 | 2–0 |
| Akmola | 0–3 | | 1–0 | 0–0 | 2–3 | 0–2 | 1–2 | 1–2 | 1–0 | 0–0 | 0–0 | 2–0 | 1–2 | 2–0 | 3–1 |
| CSKA Kairat | 0–1 | 2–0 | | 2–1 | 1–0 | 1–3 | 1–0 | 3–1 | 3–1 | 1–0 | 0–2 | 2–0 | 0–1 | 7–0 | 3–0 (Note: After the merger with Tomiris, Ordabasy Zhiger did not play a match; the remaining games were declared regular 3–0 wins for the opponents.) |
| Dostyk | 0–3 | 1–1 | 2–2 | | 2–3 | 0–3 | 0–3 | 0–2 | 1–2 | 1–3 | 2–0 | 1–0 | 1–3 | 3–0 | 3–0 |
| Irtysh Pavlodar | 2–1 | 2–1 | 3–2 | 2–0 | | 2–4 | 5–1 | 3–0 | 3–0 | 1–0 | 1–0 | 2–0 | 0–2 | 2–0 | 3–0 |
| Kairat | 0–1 | 2–1 | 1–0 | 1–0 | 0–0 | | 1–1 | 0–0 | 1–0 | 3–0 | 5–1 | 1–0 | 1–1 | 5–0 | 3–0 |
| Kaisar-Hurricane | 0–2 | 1–0 | 2–1 | 5–0 | 0–0 | 0–0 | | 0–0 | 3–0 | 4–2 | 3–1 | 1–0 | 1–2 | 2–0 | 3–0 |
| Shakhter-Ispat-Karmet | 1–2 | 0–0 | 1–0 | 1–0 | 1–0 | 2–1 | 0–0 | | 4–1 | 2–0 | 3–0 | 3–2 | 0–0 | 4–0 | 1–0 |
| Taraz | 0–0 | 1–0 | 2–1 | 1–1 | 0–2 | 0–1 | 0–0 | 1–0 | | 0–1 | 3–0 | 1–4 | 0–3 | 1–0 | 3–0 |
| Tobol | 0–2 | 2–1 | 2–2 | 3–1 | 0–1 | 1–1 | 1–0 | 2–1 | 3–0 | | 3–2 | 3–1 | 1–3 | 3–0 | 3–0 |
| Vostok Altyn | 1–3 | 0–1 | 1–2 | 3–2 | 1–2 | 0–2 | 1–0 | 1–0 | 2–2 | 1–0 | | 1–1 | 1–2 | 2–0 | 3–0 |
| Yelimay | 0–2 | 2–0 | 2–1 | 3–0 | 1–1 | 2–1 | 1–0 | 2–2 | 2–0 | 2–1 | 1–1 | | 1–2 | 4–0 | 3–0 |
| Zhenis Astana | 1–0 | 4–2 | 5–1 | 2–0 | 3–0 | 1–2 | 1–0 | 4–1 | 2–0 | 3–1 | 2–1 | 3–1 | | 8–0 | 3–0 |
| Zhetysu | 1–2 | 0–1 | 0–0 | 2–0 | 0–4 | 0–2 | 0–2 | 1–2 | 1–1 | 2–4 | 4–1 | 0–3 | 0–3 | | 1–0 |
| Zhiger | 0–3 | 0–3 | 0–1 | 1–2 | 1–3 | 1–2 | 2–2 | 0–3 | 4–2 | 2–3 | 0–3 | 0–3 | 1–2 | 0–3 | |

Legend: Blue = home team win; Yellow = draw; Red = away team win.

== Statistics ==
=== Top scorers ===
| Rank | Player | Club | Goals |
|---|---|---|---|
| 1 | (Brazil) Mendes | Irtysh-Bastau | 21 |
| 2 | (Kazakhstan) Kairat Aubakirov | Yelimay | 15 |
| 2 | (Kazakhstan) Vladimir Niederhaus | Zhenis | 15 |
| 4 | (Kazakhstan) Seitzhan Baibossynov | Zhiger/Dostyk | 14 |
| 5 | (Kazakhstan) Oleg Litvinenko | Kairat | 13 |
| 6 | (Georgia (country)) Vaso Sepashvili | Zhenis | 12 |
| 6 | (Kazakhstan) Vladimir Loginov | Kaisar-Hurricane | 12 |
| 6 | (Kazakhstan) Ruslan Imankulov | Shakhter-Ispat-Karmet | 12 |

== See also ==
- Kazakhstan national football team 2000
