= 1992 Kazakhstan Cup =

Tournament details
- Country: Kazakhstan
- Teams: 24

Final positions
- Champions: Kairat
- Runners-up: Fosfor

Tournament statistics
- Matches played: 22
- Goals scored: 81 (3.68 per match)
- Top goal scorer(s): Sergei Volgin (Kairat), 6 Oleg Litvinenko (Fosfor) 6

The 1992 Kazakhstan Cup was the first season of the Kazakhstan Cup, the annual nationwide football cup competition of Kazakhstan since the independence of the country. The competition began on 8 May 1992, and ended with the final in August 1992.

== First round ==
8 May 1992	Zhiger	2–1	Metallist Petropavlsk
	Zhanuzakov; Israilov		Kondratskiy

8 May 1992	Kairat	1–0	Shakhter Karaganda
	Volgin

8 May 1992	Gornyak-Atlant	1–2	Vostok
	Toksanov		Duzmambetov; Koloda

8 May 1992	Khimik Kustanay	3–0	Ekibastuzets
	Irzhanov; Kirillov

8 May 1992	Zhetysu	0–0 (3–4 p)	Kokshetau

8 May 1992	Montazhnik Turkestan	7–1	Spartak Semipalatinsk
	Davydov; Karashbayev; Bolshakov; Safin; A.Rykov (o.g.)		Yurchenko

8 May 1992	Metallurg Dzhezkazgan	1–2	Zenit Kokshetau
	Gorobets		Kutuzov; Sarsenbayev

8 May 1992	Fosfor Dzhambul	3–0	Aktau
	Vishnyakov; Y.Rykov; Litvinenko

== Second round ==
28 May 1992	CSKA Alma-Ata	0–3	Kaisar
			Akhmetov; Esmuratov; Ten

28 May 1992	Bulat	0–2	Gornyak Khromtau
			Mosyanov; Sorokin

28 May 1992	Zhiger	2–3	Kairat
	Sysoev; Tubashev		Kozhabergenov; Volgin; Niederhaus

28 May 1992	Vostok	3–2	Tselinnik
	Shatski; Duzmambetov		Tashenev

28 May 1992	Aktyubinets	0–2	Irtysh Pavlodar
			O.Rykov; Antonov

28 May 1992	Khimik Kustanay	(w/o)	SKIF-Arsenal

28 May 1992	Kokshetau	2–3	Montazhnik Turkestan
	Gusev; Mazloev		Safin; Bolshakov; Karashbayev

28 May 1992	Zenit Kokshetau	0–4	Fosfor
			Ismailov; Savin; Vishnyakov; Litvinenko

== Quarter-finals ==
26 June 1992	Montazhnik Turkestan	0–3	Fosfor
			Litvinenko

26 June 1992	Traktor Pavlodar	4–1	Khimik Kustanay
	Baisufinov; Kabaev; Antonov; O.Rylov		Nizovtsev

24 Jule 1992	Kaisar	4–3	Gornyak Dzhezkazgan
	Esmuratov; Turmagambetov; Kogay; Kholmatov		Mosyanov; Sorokin; Churikov

29 Jule 1992	Kairat	4–0	Vostok
	Volgin; Naidovskiy; Sklyarov

== Semi-finals ==
4 August 1992	Kaisar	2–2 (3–4 p)	Kairat
	Esmuratov; Kogay		Abildaev; Volgin

4 August 1992	Fosfor	2–0	Traktor Pavlodar
	Belskiy; Vishnyakov

== Final ==
8 August 1992

Kairat	5–1	Fosfor
Naydovskiy 9' 36'; Klimov 59'; Volgin 68'; Abildaev 77'		Litvinenko 88'

Central Stadium, Alma-Ata
Referee: Aleksandr Borisov (Semipalatinsk)
