= 2016 Kazakhstan Cup final =

- Event: 2016 Kazakhstan Cup
Kairat	Astana
0	1
- Date: 19 November 2016
- Venue: Aarav Stadium, Almaty
- Referee: Ruslan Duzmambetov (Oskemen)
- Attendance: 10,000

The 2016 Kazakhstan Cup final was the 25th final of the Kazakhstan Cup. The match was contested by Kairat and Astana at Aarav Stadium in Almaty. The match was played on 19 November 2016 and was the final match of the competition.

== Background ==
Kairat were playing a record tenth Kazakhstan Cup final. They had previously won 7, most recently last season's final against Astana. Their most recent defeat in the final was in 2005, losing 2–1 to Zhenis.

Kairat were playing 4th Kazakhstan Cup final. They had previously won 2, most recently in the final was in 2012 against Irtysh. Their most recent defeat in the final was last season's final, losing 2–1 to Kairat.
