= 1998 Kazakhstan Cup final =

- Event: 1997–98 Kazakhstan Cup
| Irtysh | Kaisar-Hurricane |
| 2 | 1 |
- Date: 10 June 1998
- Venue: Central Stadium, Almaty
- Referee: Yevgeni Shkarin (Shymkent)
- Attendance: 3,000

The 1998 Kazakhstan Cup final was the sixth final of the Kazakhstan Cup. The match was contested by Irtysh and Kaisar-Hurricane at Central Stadium in Almaty. The match was played on 10 June 1998 and was the final match of the competition with Irtysh beating Kaisar-Hurricane 2–1 after extra time.

== Background ==
Irtysh and Kaisar-Hurricane played the first Kazakhstan Cup Final.

Irtysh and Kaisar-Hurricane three times during the season of league were played. On May 17, 1997, Irtysh has won the first competition to the score 1–0 in the Central Stadium. The only goal was scored by Viktor Antonov. On September 2, 1997, Kaisar-Hurricane has beaten Irtysh with the score 1–0. The goal marked out Seitzhan Baibosynov. In the third match Irtysh was beaten by Kaisar-Hurricane with the score 1–0. The goal was scored by Oleg Malyshev.

== Route to the Final ==
=== Irtysh ===
| Round | Opposition | Score |
|---|---|---|
| FR | Did not participate | Not played |
| QF | Taraz | 2–3 (2–2 (A) / 1–0 (H)) |
| SF | CSKA-Kairat | 0–2 (0–1 (A) / 1–0 (H)) |
Key: (h) = Home venue; (a) = Away venue; (n) = Neutral venue.

=== Kaisar-Hurricane ===
| Round | Opposition | Score |
|---|---|---|
| FR | Aktobe | 2–0(1–0 (H) / 0–1 (A)) |
| QF | Batyr | 1–4 (0–1 (A) / 3–1 (H)) |
| SF | Astana | 2–1 (1–1 (H) / 0–1 (A)) |
Key: (h) = Home venue; (a) = Away venue; (n) = Neutral venue.

== Match ==
=== Details ===
10 June 1998

| Irtysh | 2–1 (a.e.t.) | Kaisar-Hurricane |
|---|---|---|
| Antonov 50', 92' | Report | Yesmuratov 60' |

Central Stadium, Almaty
Attendance: 3,000
Referee: Yevgeni Shkarin (Shymkent)

| GK | (Belarus) Igor Zhebin |
| DF | (Kazakhstan) Oyrat Saduov |
| DF | (Ukraine) Oleg Timets |
| DF | (Kazakhstan) Sultan Abildayev | (yellow card) 76' |
| DF | (Kazakhstan) Nurmat Mirzabayev |
| MF | (Kazakhstan) Viktor Antonov |
| MF | (Kazakhstan) Andrey Kucheryavykh |
| MF | (Kazakhstan) Sergei Kalabukhin |
| MF | (Kazakhstan) Aleksei Klishin | (substituted off) 63' |
| FW | (Kazakhstan) Samvel Kostandyan |
| FW | (Kazakhstan) Vitali Kitsak |
Substitutes:
| GK | (Kazakhstan) Yuri Novikov |
| DF | (Kazakhstan) Vasili Kononov |
| DF | (Kazakhstan) Sergei Pererva |
| MF | (Kazakhstan) Talgat Baisufinov |
| MF | (Ukraine) Dmitri Bidulka |
| FW | (Russia) Rakhman Asukhanov | (substituted on) 63' |
Manager:
(Russia) Voit Talgaev

| GK | (Kazakhstan) Oleg Voskoboynikov |
| DF | (Kazakhstan) Serik Abdualiyev |
| DF | (Kazakhstan) Kalandar Akhmedov | (yellow card) 61' |
| DF | (Kazakhstan) Rodion Mozgovoy |
| DF | (Kazakhstan) Marat Yesmuratov |
| MF | (Uzbekistan) Vladimir Buntov |
| MF | (Kazakhstan) Teleukhan Turmagambetov | (substituted off) 60' |
| MF | (Kazakhstan) Azamat Niyazymbetov |
| MF | (Kazakhstan) Andrei Vaganov |
| FW | (Kazakhstan) Nurken Mazbayev |
| FW | (Kazakhstan) Vladimir Loginov |
Substitutes:
| GK | (Kazakhstan) Nurlan Abuov |
| DF | (Kazakhstan) Samat Sharipov |
| DF | (Kazakhstan) Marat Sarsenov |
| MF | (Kazakhstan) Talgat Syzdykov |
| MF | (Kazakhstan) Kairzhan Abuov |
| MF | (Kazakhstan) Dmitri Yurist | (substituted on) 60' |
| FW | (Kazakhstan) Dmitri Galich |
Manager:
(Kazakhstan) Shayziddin Kenzhebayev

Match officials

- Assistant referees:
  - Yuri Mizrakhil (Almaty)
  - Alexander Koulakov (Almaty)

Man of the match

Match rules

- 90 minutes.
- 30 minutes of extra-time if necessary.
- Penalty shoot-out if scores still level.
- Seven named substitutes.
- Maximum of three substitutions.
