= Abildaev =

Abildaev (Russian: Абильдаев, Kazakh: Әбілдаев) is a Russian and Kazakh surname. Notable people with the surname include:

- Askar Abildaev (born 1971), Kazakh footballer
- Sultan Abildayev (born 1970), Kazakh footballer
