= Bolshakovo (disambiguation) =

Bolshakovo, or Bolshakovo-Novoye, a city in Slavsk District of Kaliningrad Oblast, Russia.

Bolshakovo (Russian: Большаково) may also refer to:

- Bolshakovo, Vladimir Oblast

== See also ==
- Bolshakov, a surname
