= FC Okzhetpes =

Association football club in Kazakhstan

Okzhetpes Kokshetau
- Full name: Football Club Okzhetpes
- Founded: 1957; 69 years ago
- Ground: Torpedo Stadium; Kokshetau, Kazakhstan
- Capacity: 10,000
- Chairman: Erbol Kairov
- Manager: Rinat Alyuetov
- League: Kazakhstan Premier League
- 2025: 8th
- Website: www.okzhetpes.kz
Home colours	Away colours

Football Club Okzhetpes (Kazakh: Оқжетпес Футбол Клубы, Oqjetpes Kókshetaý Fýtbol Klýby) is a Kazakhstani professional football based in the Torpedo Stadium in Kokshetau. The club currently plays in the Kazakhstan Premier League.

== History ==
Although having finished only 9th in the 2008 Kazakhstan Premier League, the club gained entry to the first qualifying round of the inaugural season of the UEFA Europa League because of the denial of licenses by UEFA and withdrawal of higher placed teams.

On 3 January 2019, Andrei Karpovich was announced as Okzhetpes manager for the 2019 Kazakhstan Premier League season.

=== Names ===
- 1957 : Founded as Torpedo
- 1990 : Renamed Spartak
- 1991 : Renamed Kokshetau
- 1994 : Renamed Kokshe
- 1997 : Renamed Avtomobilist and moved to Shortandy (Nur-Sultan suburb)
- 1998 : Renamed Khimik and moved to Stepnogorsk
- 1999 : Renamed Akmola
- 2000 : Moved back to Kokshetau
- 2001 : Renamed Esil
- 2004 : Renamed Okzhetpes

Should not be mistaken with the defunct club FC Azhar also based in Kokshetau

=== Origin of name ===
The club takes its name from a cliff, Okzhetpes, which means 'an arrow won't reach'. According to fan club president Viktor Kruk:

"Eighteenth century Kazakh ruler Ablai Khan could not decide which of his warriors to give a captive girl to and so allowed her to choose a husband for herself. She climbed to the top of the highest cliff and said she would marry whoever hit her shawl with an arrow. Nobody managed it."

=== Domestic history ===
Season	League									Kazakhstan Cup	Top goalscorer		Manager
Season	Div.	Pos.	Pl.	W	D	L	GS	GA	P	Kazakhstan Cup	Name	League	Manager
1992	1st	20	18	2	2	14	12	61	8		(Kazakhstan) V.Gusev (Kazakhstan) V.Kazankov 7	7	
1993	1st	-	-	-	-	-	-	-	-	-	-	-	-
1994	2nd	3	36	22	5	9	65	27	49		(Kazakhstan) A.Krivoruchko	11	
1995	2nd	3	10	6	1	3	12	8	19		(Kazakhstan) N.Suleymenov	5	
1996	1st	18	34	2	4	28	12	77	10		(Kazakhstan) Konstantin Kucherbaev	4	
1997	1st	11	26	5	0	21	23	38	15	Second round			
1998	1st	8	26	7	8	11	22	33	29	Quarter-final			
1999	1st	16	30	2	4	24	19	68	10	First round			
2000	1st	10	28	8	5	15	25	34	29	First round	(Kazakhstan) S.Kondratsky	4	
2001	1st	10	32	12	8	12	35	37	44	First round	(Russia) Oleg Kirimov	8	
2002	1st	12	32	6	6	20	25	56	24		(Kazakhstan) V.Karpov	7	
2003	1st	17	32	4	9	19	13	42	15		(Russia) Arsen Tlekhugov (Kazakhstan) M.Bielik (Russia) Roman Babichev	2	
2004	1st	11	36	10	13	13	26	39	43		(Russia) Anatoli Malkov	5	
2005	1st	9	30	11	4	15	26	32	37		(Kazakhstan) Serik Dosmanbetov	7	
2006	1st	11	30	8	9	13	23	36	33		(Turkmenistan) Gahrymanberdi Çoňkaýew	3	(Belarus) S.Herasimets
2007	1st	15	30	8	5	17	26	56	29		(Kazakhstan) Serik Dosmanbetov (Turkmenistan) Gahrymanberdi Çoňkaýew	5	
2008	1st	9	30	10	5	15	32	48	35	First round	(Kazakhstan) Serik Dosmanbetov	7	(Kazakhstan) Vyacheslav Ledovskih (Kazakhstan) Viktor Rymar
2009	1st	11	26	6	4	16	22	48	22	Second round	(Russia) Anatoli Malkov	5	(Belarus) S.Herasimets
2010	1st	12	32	6	7	19	24	57	25	Second round	(Ukraine) Yuri Dyak (Kazakhstan) Khasan Abdukarimov	5	(Belarus) S.Herasimets
2011	2nd	2	32	21	6	5	59	25	69	Quarter-final	(Kazakhstan) Geysar Alekperzade	10	(Kazakhstan) V.Cheburin
2012	1st	14	26	3	2	21	20	56	11	Second round	(Georgia (country)) Davit Chagelishvili	6	(Ukraine) V.Dohadailo (Kazakhstan) V.Cheburin
2013	2nd	3	34	20	7	7	51	27	67	First round	(Kazakhstan) Alibek Buleshev	14	(Kazakhstan) S.Abdualiyev
2014	2nd	1	28	21	1	6	59	33	64	First round	(Kazakhstan) Alibek Buleshev	22	(Kazakhstan) S.Abdualiyev (Kazakhstan) A.Ferapontov
2015	1st	8	32	12	6	14	36	41	29	Quarter-final	(Montenegro) Luka Rotković	13	(Russia) V.Mukhanov
2016	1st	5	32	13	6	13	42	44	45	Quarter-final	(Cameroon) Serge Bando N'Ganbe	9	(Russia) V.Mukhanov
2017	1st	12	33	7	3	23	28	61	24	Quarter-final	(Russia) Aleksandr Kozlov (Kazakhstan) Timur Dosmagambetov	4	(Russia) V.Mukhanov (Ukraine) V.Pasulko
2018	2nd	1	33	23	5	5	61	27	74	Last 16			
2019	1st	7	33	11	7	15	44	49	40	Last 16	(Serbia) Milan Stojanović	7	(Kazakhstan) A.Karpovich
2020	1st	11	20	2	5	13	16	38	11	-	(Estonia) Artjom Dmitrijev	5	(Kazakhstan) A.Karpovich

=== Continental history ===
Season	Competition	Round	Club	Home	Away	Aggregate
2009–10	UEFA Europa League	1Q	(Moldova) Zimbru Chișinău	0–2	2–1	2–3
2027–28	UEFA Conference League	1Q				

Notes

- 1Q: First qualifying round
- 2Q: Second qualifying round
- 3Q: Third qualifying round
- PO: Play-off round

== Current squad ==
As of 1 August, 2026

Note: Flags indicate national team as defined under FIFA eligibility rules; some limited exceptions apply. Players may hold more than one non-FIFA nationality.

No.	Pos.	Nation	Player
1	GK	KAZ	Mikhail Golubnichiy
2	DF	KAZ	Zhalgas Zhaksylykov
3	DF	UKR	Borys Lototskyi
4	DF	KAZ	Viktor Zyabko
5	DF	BRA	Léo Assunpção
6	MF	KAZ	Zhansultan Mukhametkhanov
7	FW	KAZ	Vladimir Vomenko
8	MF	KAZ	Nurgaini Buribaev
9	MF	BLR	Dzmitry Baradzin
10	MF	KAZ	Yerkebulan Nurgaliyev
11	FW	KAZ	Toktar Zhangylyshbay
12	GK	KAZ	Aleksandr Dovgal
14	DF	KAZ	Sayan Mukanov
16	DF	KAZ	Beksultan Shamshi
17	FW	UZB	Shokhboz Umarov

No.	Pos.	Nation	Player
19	FW	KAZ	Oralkhan Omirtayev
20	MF	KAZ	Mokhammed Ensebaev
22	GK	RUS	Miroslav Lobantsev
23	MF	KAZ	Kobylandy Kamariden
25	MF	BRA	Marcinho
44	DF	KAZ	Dmitriy Trubitsin
47	MF	KAZ	Vladislav Vasiljev (captain)
55	MF	KAZ	Nikita Mikhailov
63	DF	RUS	Ivan Kuzmichyov
67	FW	KAZ	Ravil Atykhanov
77	MF	BLR	Vasily Sovpel
90	FW	BLR	Vsevolod Sadovsky
91	FW	UZB	Bektemir Abdumannonov (on loan from Dinamo Samarqand)
-	GK	KAZ	Erlan Shaymurat

== Managers ==
- (Belarus) Syarhyey Hyerasimets (2006), (2009–10)
- (Kazakhstan) Vladimir Cheburin (January 2011 – December 2011)
- (Ukraine) Viktor Dohadailo (December 2011 – March 2012)
- (Kazakhstan) Viktor Semenov (interim) (March 2012– May 2012)
- (Kazakhstan) Vladimir Cheburin (May 2012 – Feb 2013)
- (Russia) Vladimir Mukhanov (December 2014 – May 2017)
- (Kazakhstan) Viktor Semenov (interim) (May 2017– May 2017)
- (Ukraine) Viktor Pasulko (May 2017 – September 2017)
- (Kazakhstan) Sergey Popkov (December 2017 – December 2017)
- (Russia) Andrei Karpovich (January 2019 –December 2020)
- (Russia) Sergei Popkov (January 2021 – present)
