= Kireyev =

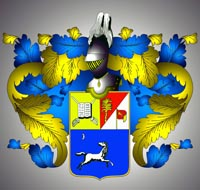
Coat of arms of the Kireyev family

The Kireyev family (Russian: Кире́ев; sometimes anglicized to Kireev) is an old Russian noble family.

== History ==
The Kireyev family served the Russian Throne for generations as a minor noble family, their estate stretching across southern and central Russia. Dating back to the early 16th century, records list certain Kireyevs such as Yakov and Syemyon Kireyev as property owners in Saratov, Perm, and Simbirsk serving a number of mostly minor positions, with the occasional noble finding his way to power in Moscow itself.

Many also served as military leaders, such as Mamaj, Petr, and Aleksei Kireyev hailing from Kazan. Throughout the later parts of the 16th century, a few Kireyevs served under Ivan the Terrible in positions of military leadership, such as Davyd Kireyev who served as a guardsman, and Andrei Ivanovich who lost his life fighting the armies of the Crimean Tatar Khan Davlet I Giray during the Battle of Molodi. Two centuries later, some, turned to Don Cossacks, would fight as a family clan against the invading Ottoman Army during the 1787 Russo-Turkish War, as well as in the Polish–Russian War of 1792 under the call of Catherine the Great. Into the 1920s, Kireyevs resided in Old Believer Nekrasov Cossack villages such as Esaulovskaya in the Don Host Obslast. Establishing themselves in the Nekrasov community, Kireyevs were often persecuted under the Soviet government for their non-orthodox beliefs, with many fighting against the Red Army in the White movement throughout the 1920s. After decades of persecution under the process of Decossackization, some of those left over fought alongside the Nazi German Army when it invaded in 1941, the ones that survived dying in exile.

In 2011, a Pecherskiy District Ukrainian judge descended from the family—Rodion Kireyev—came to prominence after ordering the detention of, and later sentencing Yulia Timoshenko to seven years in prison. Shortly thereafter he fled Ukraine, and as a result an arrest warrant was issued against him in 2015 by a near-supermajority of the Verkhovna Rada.

== Crest ==
The shield is divided into three parts. In the top left corner is depicted a golden field, with two crossed swords and an open book overlaid. The top right corner is diagonally divided into two parts. The top red field features a golden palm tree, and the silver field on the bottom sits a banner. In the lower part, in a blue field, a white horse gallops to the left, its head facing towards a silver moon. The shield is crowned with a helmet of royal nobility, luscious gold and blue feathers emanating from either side.

The crest was added to the official General Roll of Arms of Noble Families of the Allrussian Empire in 1821 at the petition of Guard Ensign Nikolai Nikitin Kireyev to Tsar Alexander I, presenting evidence from the noble genealogy book of the Tula Governorate.

== Notable people ==
It is shared by the following people:

- Andrei Kireyev, Russian professional footballer
- Anton Kireyev, Russian professional football player
- Igor Kireyev, Russian professional football player
- Ivan Kireyev, Uzbek sprint canoer
- Roman Kireyev, Kazakhstani road bicycle racer
- Viktor Kireyev (handballer) (born 1987), Russian handball player
- Vladimir Kireyev (born 1972), Russian footballer

== Notable places ==
Places that derive from this surname:

- Kireyev (ru), a khutor in Oblivsky District, Rostov Oblast, Russia.
- Kireyeva (ru), it is a river in Tomsk Oblast and Novosibirsk Oblast in Russia, a right tributary of the Ob River.
