= 2014 Kazakhstan Cup final =

- Event: 2014 Kazakhstan Cup
Kairat	Aktobe
4	1
- Date: 22 November 2014
- Venue: Astana Arena, Astana
- Referee: Ruslan Duzmambetov (Oskemen)
- Attendance: 10,000

The 2014 Kazakhstan Cup final was the 23rd final of the Kazakhstan Cup. The match was contested by Kairat and Aktobe at Astana Arena in Astana. The match was played on 22 November 2014 and was the final match of the competition.

== Background ==
Kairat played a record 8th Kazakhstan Cup-final. They won 5 finals, the last time in the 2003 season against Tobol. Their last defeat in the final was in 2005, having lost 2–1 to Zhenis.

It was the 3rd final for Aktobe. They had won only once, in the 2008 season against Alma-Ata. Their other defeat in the final was in 1994, having lost 1–0 to Vostok.

Kairat and Aktobe played twice during the league season. On May 1, 2015 Aktobe won the first game 1–0 at Central Stadium. The only goal in the match was scored by Marat Khairullin. On June 6, 2015 Kairat crushed Aktobe with the score 7-1. Goals were scored by: Gerard Gohou (hat trick), Josip Knezevic (double), Zaurbek Pliyev, Bauyrzhan Islamkhan (Kairat) and Oleksiy Antonov (Aktobe).

== Route to the Final ==
=== Kairat ===
Round	Opposition	Score
FR	Okzhetpes (A)	1–3
SR	Gefest (H)	3–1
QF	Atyrau (A)	1–3
SF	Shakhter	4–0 (2–0 (H) / 0–2 (A))
Key: (h) = Home venue; (a) = Away venue; (n) = Neutral venue.

=== Aktobe ===
Round	Opposition	Score
FR	Did not participate	Not played
SR	Kaisar (A)	0–3
QF	Taraz (H)	2–1
SF	Astana	2–2 (3–4 p) (1–1 (H) / 1–1 (A))
Key: (h) = Home venue; (a) = Away venue; (n) = Neutral venue.

== Match ==
=== Details ===
22 November 2014
15:00 AST

Kairat	4–1	Aktobe
Arzumanyan 20' (o.g.); Gohou 31' 66'; Darabayev 86'	Report	Logvinenko 27'

Astana Arena, Astana
Attendance: 10,000
Referee: Ruslan Duzmambetov (Oskemen)

Kairat	Aktobe

GK	24	(Kazakhstan) Serhiy Tkachuk
DF	3	(Kazakhstan) Mark Gurman	(substituted off) 82'
DF	6	(Serbia) Zarko Markovic
DF	20	(Slovakia) Lubomir Michalik	(yellow card) 57'
MF	17	(Kazakhstan) Aslan Darabayev	(substituted off) 90+2'
MF	31	(Brazil) Isael da Silva Barbosa
MF	9	(Kazakhstan) Bauyrzhan Islamkhan (c)
MF	13	(Kazakhstan) Ermek Kyantayev
MF	32	(Kazakhstan) Islambek Kuat
FW	30	(Ivory Coast) Gerard Gohou	(substituted off) 90+2'
MF	26	(Spain) Sito Riera	(red card) 89'
Substitutes:
GK	51	(Kazakhstan) Vladimir Groshev
DF	18	(Kazakhstan) Timur Rudoselskiy	(substituted on) 90+2'
MF	25	(Kazakhstan) Oybek Baltabayev
MF	10	(Croatia) Josip Knezevic
FW	14	(Kazakhstan) Bauyrzhan Baytana	(substituted on) 90+2'
FW	28	(Kazakhstan) Stanislav Lunin	(substituted on) 82'
FW	29	(Kazakhstan) Vitali Li
Manager:
(Slovakia) Vladimir Weiss

GK	55	(Kazakhstan) Andrei Sidelnikov
DF	16	(Armenia) Robert Arzumanyan
DF	23	(Kazakhstan) Yuri Logvinenko
DF	7	(Kazakhstan) Dmitri Miroshnichenko
DF	70	(Brazil) Anderson Santana dos Santos	(yellow card) 25'
MF	21	(Kazakhstan) Valeri Korobkin	(yellow card) 59'
MF	9	(Armenia) Marcos Pizzelli	(substituted off) 90+1'
MF	17	(Kazakhstan) Askhat Tagybergen	(substituted off) 71'
MF	10	(Kazakhstan) Marat Khairullin (c)
MF	6	(Kazakhstan) Taras Tsarikayev
FW	86	(Ukraine) Oleksiy Antonov
Substitutes:
GK	40	(Kazakhstan) Almat Bekbayev
DF	3	(Kazakhstan) Aleksei Muldarov
MF	18	(Kazakhstan) Pavel Shabalin
FW	73	(Kazakhstan) Didar Zhalmukan	(substituted on) 90+1'
MF	80	(Uzbekistan) Timur Kapadze
FW	78	(Belarus) Ihar Zyankovich
FW	95	(Kazakhstan) Abat Ayimbetov	(substituted on) 71'
Manager:
(Russia) Vladimir Gazzayev

Man of the match

Match officials

- Assistant referees:
  - Serik Zhappasbayev (Kyzylorda)
  - Yevgeni Belski (Taraz)
- Fourth official: Elesh Kusainov (Astana)
- Reserve official: Igor Khisamutdinov (Pavlodar)

Match rules

- 90 minutes.
- 30 minutes of extra-time if necessary.
- Penalty shoot-out if scores still level.
- Seven named substitutes.
- Maximum of three substitutions.

=== Statistics ===
Statistic	Kairat	Aktobe
Goals scored	4	1
Possession	38%	62%
Shots on target	9	5
Shots off target	10	11
Corner kicks	5	1
Fouls	12	12
Offsides	1	2
Yellow cards	2	2
Red cards	1	0
