= Aleksandr Kulakov =

Aleksandr Kulakov may refer to:

- Aleksandr Kulakov (politician) (born 1966), Russian governor, military officer and power engineer
- Alexander Kulakov (born 1983), Belarusian ice hockey player
- Aleksandrs Kulakovs (born 1956), Latvian footballer
- Alexander Koulakov (born 1952), Kazakhstani football referee in the 1998 Kazakhstan Cup final
