= Churikov =

Churikov (Russian: Чуриков) is a Russian masculine surname, its feminine counterpart is Churikova. It may refer to the following notable people:

- Inna Churikova (1943–2023), Russian film and theatre actress
- Vyacheslav Churikov (1970–2014), Russian football player
- Yana Churikova (born 1978), Russian journalist and television host
