= Kireev =

Kireev is a surname. Notable people with the surname include:

- Alexey Kireev (born 1985), Russian bobsledder
- Maksim Kireev (born 2004), Belgian-born Belarusian footballer

== See also ==
- Kireyev, another surname
