= Sergey Savin =

Sergey Savin or Sergei Savin may refer to:

- Sergey Savin (volleyball) (born 1988), Russian volleyball player
- Sergei Savin (football), Kazakhstani football player (competed at the 1992 Kazakhstan Cup Final)
