= Andrey Kucheryavykh =

Kazakhstani footballer (born 1970)

Personal information
- Full name: Andrey Aleksandrovich Kucheryavykh
- Date of birth: 24 September 1970 (age 56)
- Place of birth: Pavlodar, Kazakh SSR
- Positions: Defender; midfielder

Team information
- Current team: Irtysh Omsk (assistant coach)

Senior career*
Years	Team	Apps	(Gls)
1988–1991	Traktor Pavlodar	123	(6)
1988	→ Traktor Pavlodar Youth		
1992–1995	Ansat Pavlodar	115	(16)
1996	Kairat	28	(5)
1997–1998	Irtysh Pavlodar	44	(4)
1999–2001	Kyzylzhar	81	(6)
2002–2005	Irtysh Pavlodar	94	(2)

International career
1996–2000	Kazakhstan	7	(1)

Managerial career
- 2011: Kazakhmys
- 2012–2013: Bayterek
- 2014–2016: Irtysh-d Pavlodar
- 2017: Ekibastuz
- 2018: Kyzylzhar-d
- 2018: Kyzylzhar
- 2021: Irtysh Omsk (caretaker)
- 2021: Irtysh Omsk (caretaker)
- 2022–: Irtysh Omsk (assistant)
- * Club domestic league appearances and goals

Andrey Kucheryavykh (born 24 September 1970) is a Kazakhstani football coach and a former player. He is an assistant coach of Russian club Irtysh Omsk.

== Career ==
=== Coaching ===
In July 2019, Kucheryavykh was appointed as a coach at Irtysh Omsk.

== Career statistics ==
=== International ===
As of match played 8 April 2000

Kazakhstan national team
Year	Apps	Goals
1996	3	0
1997	0	0
1998	0	0
1999	0	0
2000	4	1
Total	7	1

=== International goals ===
As of goal scored on 8 April 2000
Scores and results list Tajikistan's goal tally first, score column indicates score after each Tajikistan goal.

List of international goals scored by Rustam Zabirov for Tajikistan
No.	Date	Venue	Opponent	Score	Result	Competition	Ref.
1	8 April 2000	Jassim bin Hamad Stadium, Doha, Qatar	Pakistan	3–0	4–0	2000 AFC Asian Cup qualification	

== Honours ==
Ansat Pavlodar

- Kazakhstan Premier League (1): 1993

Kairat

- Kazakhstan Cup (1): 1997

Irtysh Pavlodar

- Kazakhstan Premier League (3): 1997, 2002, 2003
- Kazakhstan Cup (1): 1998
