= Bolshakov =

Bolshakov (masculine, Russian: Большаков) or Bolshakova (feminine, Russian: Большакова) is a Russian surname. Notable people with the surname include:

- Aleksei Bolshakov (born 1966), Soviet and Russian football player
- Denis Bolshakov (born 1987), Russian footballer
- Dmitri Bolshakov (born 1980), Russian footballer
- Georgi Bolshakov (1922–1989), Soviet intelligence officer and secret diplomat
- Maria Bolshakova
- Nikolay Bolshakov (born 1967), Soviet and Russian cross-country skier
- Sergei Bolshakov (born 1996), Russian ice hockey player
- Sergey Bolshakov (born 1988), Russian swimmer
- Svetlana Bolshakova
