= Sergei Popkov =

Russian footballer and coach

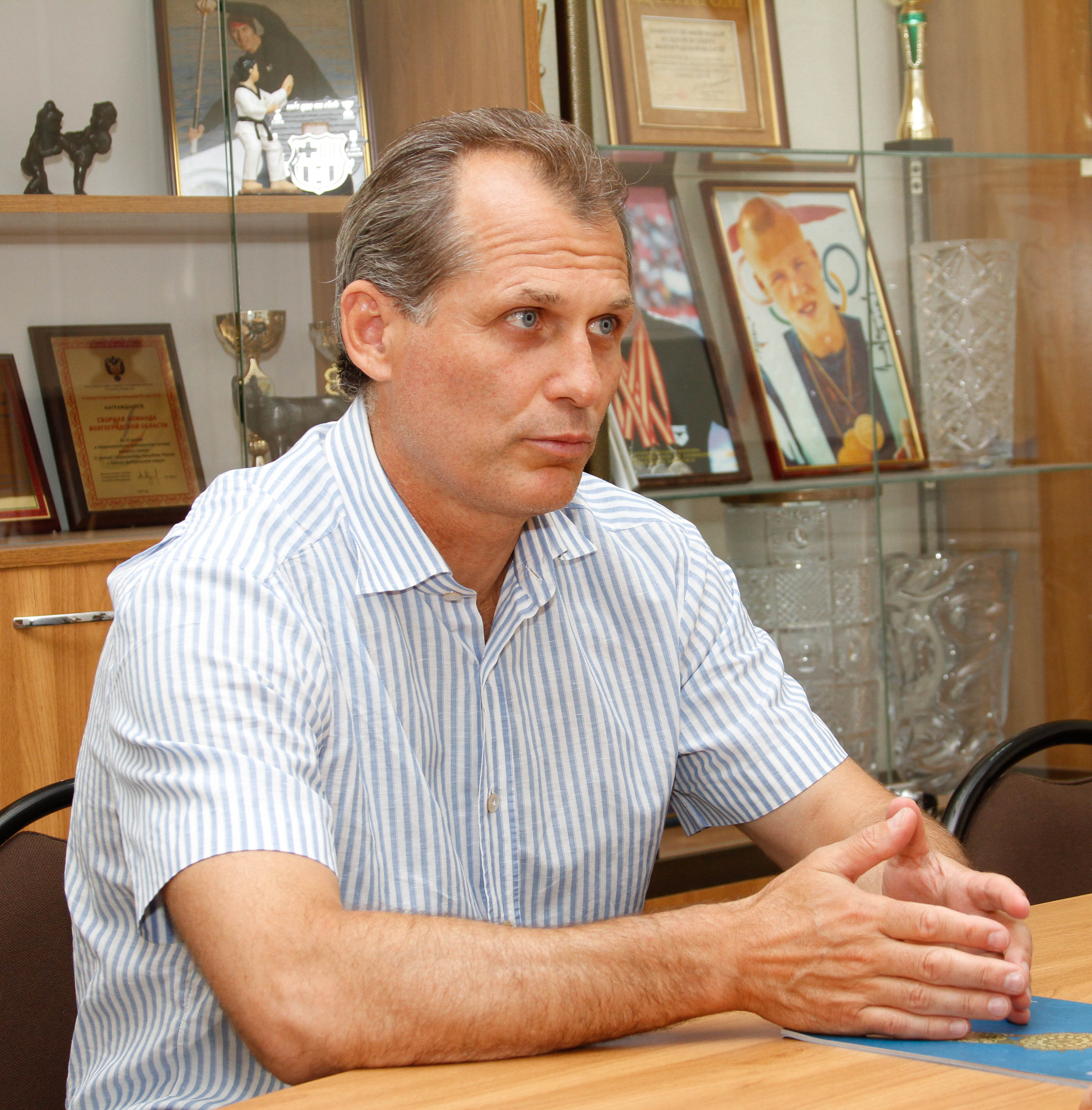

Personal information
- Full name: Sergei Nikolayevich Popkov
- Date of birth: 28 July 1963 (age 63)

Senior career*
Years	Team	Apps	(Gls)
1987	FC Volgar Astrakhan	7	(0)

Managerial career
- 1995: FC Dynamo Mikhaylovka
- 2000: FC Olimpia Volgograd (assistant)
- 2001–2002: FC Olimpia Volgograd
- 2002: FC Titan Reutov (caretaker)
- 2004: FC Izhevsk (assistant)
- 2005: FC Shinnik Yaroslavl (reserves assistant)
- 2006: Dinaburg FC
- 2007: FC Rotor Volgograd
- 2008: FC Volga Tver (assistant)
- 2008: FC Rotor Volgograd (director)
- 2009: FC Astrakhan
- 2014: FC Zenit-Izhevsk Izhevsk (assistant)
- 2016: FC Astrakhan
- 2016: FC Ordabasy (assistant)
- 2017–2018: FC Okzhetpes
- 2020–2021: FC Tyumen
- 2021–2023: FC Okzhetpes
- 2023–2024: FC Rotor Volgograd
- 2024–2025: FC Tyumen (assistant)
- 2025: FC Tyumen
- * Club domestic league appearances and goals

Sergei Nikolayevich Popkov (Russian: Серге́й Николаевич Попков; born 28 July 1963) is a Russian professional football coach and a former player.
