= Anatoli Malkov =

Russian footballer

Personal information
- Full name: Anatoli Aleksandrovich Malkov
- Date of birth: 8 July 1981 (age 45)
- Place of birth: Volgograd, Russian SFSR
- Height: 1.77 m (5 ft 10 in)
- Position: Forward

Youth career
- VUOR Volgograd

Senior career*
Years	Team	Apps	(Gls)
1998–2001	FC Rotor Volgograd	0	(0)
1998–2000	→ FC Rotor-2 Volgograd	39	(1)
2001–2002	FC Energetik Uren	37	(5)
2003–2004	FC Okzhetpes	60	(8)
2005–2006	FC Aktobe-Lento	38	(5)
2007	FC Vostok	29	(1)
2008–2009	FC Okzhetpes	43	(8)
2010	FC Vostok	27	(6)
2011	FC Atyrau	2	(0)
2011–2012	FC Kaisar	34	(4)
2013–2014	FC Kyzylzhar	53	(4)
2015–2016	FC Spartak Gelendzhik		
- * Club domestic league appearances and goals

Anatoli Aleksandrovich Malkov (Russian: Анато́лий Алекса́ндрович Малков; born 8 July 1981) is a former Russian professional footballer.

== Club career ==
He played nine seasons in the Kazakhstan Premier League.

== Honours ==
- Kazakhstan Premier League runner-up: 2006.
