= 2015 Kazakhstan Cup final =

- The match programme cover
- Event: 2015 Kazakhstan Cup
| Astana | Kairat |
| 1 | 2 |
- Date: 21 November 2015
- Venue: Astana Arena, Astana
- Referee: Cüneyt Çakir (Turkey)
- Attendance: 10,500

The 2015 Kazakhstan Cup final was the 24th final of the Kazakhstan Cup. The match was contested by Astana and Kairat at Astana Arena in Astana. The match was played on 21 November 2015 and was the final match of the competition.

== Background ==
It was Astana's third Kazakhstan Cup final. They had won both previous finals, most recently in 2012 with a 2–0 win over Irtysh.

Kairat were playing a record ninth final. They had previously won 6, most recently last season's final against Aktobe. Their most recent defeat in the final was in 2005, losing 2–1 to Zhenis.

Astana and Kairat had played twice during the league season. In the first game, on April 19, 2015 Astana won 4–3 at Astana Arena. Georgy Zhukov, Nemanja Maksimovic, Bauyrzhan Dzholchiyev and Tanat Nusserbayev scored for Astana, and Gerard Gohou scored twice and Bauyrzhan Islamkhan scored once for Kairat. On June 28, 2015, Kairat won a victory 2–0 with goals from Isael and Bauyrzhan Islamkhan's penalty.

== Route to the Final ==
=== Astana ===
| Round | Opposition | Score |
|---|---|---|
| SR | Ekibastuz (A) | 2–3 |
| QF | Kaisar (A) (after extra time) | 1–2 |
| SF | Aktobe | 1–3 (0–2 (A) / 1–1 (H)) |
Key: (h) = Home venue; (a) = Away venue; (n) = Neutral venue.

=== Kairat ===
| Round | Opposition | Score |
|---|---|---|
| SR | Irtysh (H) | 0–0 (4–1 p) |
| QF | Taraz (H) | 4–1 |
| SF | Tobol | 1–5 (0–3 (A) / 1–2 (H)) |
Key: (h) = Home venue; (a) = Away venue; (n) = Neutral venue.

== Match ==
=== Details ===
21 November 2015
15:00 AST

| Astana | 1–2 | Kairat |
|---|---|---|
| Twumasi 28' | Report | Despotovic 48', 70' |

Astana Arena, Astana
Attendance: 10,500
Referee: Cüneyt Çakir (Turkey)

| Astana | Kairat |

| GK | 1 | (Kazakhstan) Nenad Eric |
| DF | 15 | (Kazakhstan) Abzal Beisebekov | (substituted off) 76' |
| DF | 44 | (Kazakhstan) Yevgeny Postnikov |
| DF | 5 | (Bosnia and Herzegovina) Marin Anicic |
| DF | 77 | (Kazakhstan) Dmitri Shomko | | (yellow card) 15' |
| MF | 11 | (Kazakhstan) Serikzhan Muzhikov |
| MF | 19 | (Kazakhstan) Georgy Zhukov |
| MF | 6 | (Serbia) Nemanja Maksimovic |
| FW | 22 | (Kazakhstan) Bauyrzhan Dzholchiyev | | (substituted off) 76' |
| FW | 17 | (Kazakhstan) Tanat Nusserbayev (c) | | (substituted off) 86' |
| FW | 18 | (Ghana) Patrick Twumasi |
Substitutes:
| GK | 85 | (Kazakhstan) Vladimir Loginovsky |
| DF | 28 | (Kazakhstan) Birzhan Kulbekov |
| DF | 33 | (Slovenia) Branko Ilic | | (substituted on) 68' |
| MF | 10 | (Central African Republic) Foxi Kethevoama | | (substituted on) 76' |
| NF | 24 | (Ukraine) Denys Dedechko |
| FW | 9 | (Kazakhstan) Aleksey Shchotkin | | (substituted on) 86' |
| FW | 89 | (Republic of the Congo) Junior Kabananga | | (substituted on) 76' |
Manager:
(Bulgaria) Stanimir Stoilov

| GK | 1 | (Kazakhstan) Vladimir Plotnikov |
| DF | 2 | (Kazakhstan) Timur Rudoselskiy | (substituted off) 83' |
| DF | 3 | (Russia) Zaurbek Pliyev |
| DF | 4 | (Brazil) Bruno Soares |
| DF | 6 | (Serbia) Zarko Markovic | (yellow card) 64' |
| MF | 8 | (Russia) Mikhail Bakayev |
| MF | 9 | (Kazakhstan) Bauyrzhan Islamkhan (c) |
| MF | 15 | (Spain) Sito Riera |
| MF | 20 | (Kazakhstan) Islambek Kuat | (substituted off) 89' |
| MF | 44 | (Ukraine) Anatoliy Tymoshchuk |
| FW | 28 | (Serbia) Dorde Despotovic | (yellow card) 44' | (substituted off) 90+3' |
Substitutes:
| GK | 16 | (Kazakhstan) Serhiy Tkachuk |
| DF | 5 | (Kazakhstan) Mark Gurman | (substituted on) 89' |
| DF | 13 | (Kazakhstan) Ermek Kuantayev |
| MF | 10 | (Brazil) Isael da Silva Barbosa |
| MF | 17 | (Kazakhstan) Aslan Darabayev |
| MF | 24 | (Kazakhstan) Rifat Nurmugamet | (substituted on) 83' |
| FW | 11 | (Ivory Coast) Gerard Gohou | (substituted on) 90+3' |
Manager:
(Slovakia) Vladimir Weiss

Man of the match

Match officials

- Assistant referees:
  - Bahattin Duran (Turkey)
  - Tarik Ongun (Turkey)
- Fourth official: Artem Kuchin (Karagandy)
- Reserve official: Zhumagali Mumbayev (Shymkent)

Match rules

- 90 minutes.
- 30 minutes of extra-time if necessary.
- Penalty shoot-out if scores still level.
- Seven named substitutes.
- Maximum of three substitutions.

=== Statistics ===
| Statistic | Astana | Kairat |
|---|---|---|
| Goals scored | 1 | 2 |
| Possession | 51% | 49% |
| Shots on target | 4 | 6 |
| Shots off target | 7 | 11 |
| Corner kicks | 2 | 6 |
| Fouls | 14 | 15 |
| Offsides | 0 | 3 |
| Yellow cards | 1 | 2 |
| Red cards | 0 | 0 |
