= Guram Makayev =

Kazakhstani footballer (born 1970)

Personal information
- Full name: Guram Makayev
- Date of birth: 18 February 1970 (age 56)
- Place of birth: Soviet Union
- Height: 1.82 m (5 ft 11 1/2 in)
- Position: Forward

Senior career*
| Years | Team | Apps | (Gls) |
| 1987 | SKIF Almaty | 2 | (0) |
| 1988–1990 | Ekibastuzets | 30 | (4) |
| 1991 | Khimik Dzhambul | 18 | (2) |
| 1991 | Kairat | 8 | (0) |
| 1992–1993 | Ekibastuzets | 72 | (26) |
| 1994–1995 | Batyr | 40 | (13) |
| 1995–1996 | Lommel | 7 | (0) |
| 1996–1997 | Royal Antwerp | 19 | (4) |
| 1997–1998 | Batyr | 31 | (10) |
| 1999 | Shakhter | 20 | (5) |
| 2000 | CSKA Kairat | 21 | (3) |
| 2001–2002 | Atyrau | 55 | (20) |
| 2003–2004 | Zhetysu | 40 | (8) |
| 2004 | Ordabasy | 11 | (0) |

International career
| 1994–1998 | Kazakhstan | 10 | (1) |
- * Club domestic league appearances and goals

Guram Makayev (born 18 February 1970) is a retired Kazakhstani football forward.

Makayev played club football for FC Kairat in the Soviet First League, before playing for several clubs in the Kazakhstan Premier League, including FC Ekibastuzets and FC Atyrau. He also had a spell in Belgium with K.F.C. Lommel S.K. and Royal Antwerp FC.

Makayev made 10 appearances and scored one goal for the Kazakhstan national football team from 1994 to 1998.
