= Sergei Bolshakov =

Russian ice hockey goaltender

- Born: June 2, 1996 (age 29) Moscow, Russia
- Height: 6 ft 2 in (188 cm)
- Weight: 181 lb (82 kg; 12 st 13 lb)
- Position: Goaltender
- Catches: Left
- VHL team Former teams: Khimik Voskresensk; Amur Khabarovsk
- NHL draft: Undrafted
- Playing career: 2014–present

Sergei Bolshakov (born June 2, 1996) is a Russian professional ice hockey goaltender. He is currently playing with Khimik Voskresensk of the Supreme Hockey League (VHL).

On September 25, 2014, Bolshakov made his Kontinental Hockey League debut playing with Amur Khabarovsk during the 2014–15 KHL season. On May 1, 2016, Bolshakov opted to transfer from Khabarovsk in agreeing to a contract with KHL rival, HC Sochi.

From October 2, 2021, the Dynamo-Minsk goalkeeper
