= Yuriy Naydovskiy =

Kazakhstani footballer

Personal information
- Date of birth: 10 April 1963 (age 63)
- Place of birth: Soviet Union
- Height: 1.85 m (6 ft 1 in)
- Position: Forward

Senior career*
Years	Team	Apps	(Gls)
1982–1989	Kairat Almaty	78	(13)
1990	FC Metalurh Zaporizhya	22	(1)
1991–1992	Kairat Almaty		
1994–1995	Torpedo Volzhsky	63	(9)

International career
1992	Kazakhstan	3	(0)
- * Club domestic league appearances and goals

Yuriy Naydovskiy (born 10 April 1963) is a former Kazakhstani professional football player. He played for Kairat Almaty in the Soviet Top League and Kazakhstan Premier League.

Naydovskiy made three appearances for the Kazakhstan national football team, all at the 1992 Central Asian Cup.
