= Vaso Sepashvili =

Soviet and Georgian footballer

Personal information
- Date of birth: 17 December 1969 (age 56)
- Place of birth: Gurjaani, Georgian SSR
- Height: 1.78 m (5 ft 10 in)
- Positions: Striker; midfielder

Youth career
- FC Alazani Gurjaani

Senior career*
Years	Team	Apps	(Gls)
1988–1989	SKA Tbilisi		
1990	FC Aktyubinets Aktyubinsk	29	(3)
1991	FC Torpedo Armavir	3	(1)
1991–1992	FC Aktyubinets Aktyubinsk	40	(7)
1992–1993	FC Alazani Gurjaani	29	(2)
1993–1995	FC Kakheti Telavi	41	(19)
1995–1996	FC Lada Togliatti	45	(11)
1997–1998	FC Neftekhimik Nizhnekamsk	50	(10)
1998–1999	PFC Spartak Nalchik	60	(22)
2000–2001	FC Zhenis	48	(16)
2002–2003	FC Alazani Gurjaani	8	(0)

International career
1993–1996	Georgia	3	(0)
- * Club domestic league appearances and goals

Vaso Sepashvili (Georgian: ვასო სეფაშვილი; born 17 December 1969) is a former Georgian professional footballer.

== Club career ==
He made his professional debut in the Soviet Second League B in 1990 for FC Aktyubinets Aktyubinsk.

== Honours ==
Zhenis

- Kazakhstan Premier League: 2000, 2001.
