= Bolshakovo, Vladimir Oblast =

Bolshakovo Большаково
- Village
- Location within Vladimir Oblast Location within Russia
- Coordinates: 56°29′N 41°11′E
- Country: Russia
- Region: Vladimir Oblast
- District: Kovrovsky District
- Time zone: UTC+3:00

Bolshakovo (Russian: Большаково) is a rural locality (a village) in Malyginskoye Rural Settlement, Kovrovsky District, Vladimir Oblast, Russia. The population was 9 as of 2010.

== Geography ==
Bolshakovo is located 20 km northwest of Kovrov (the district's administrative centre) by road. Khvatachevo is the nearest rural locality.
