= Anton Kireyev =

Russian footballer

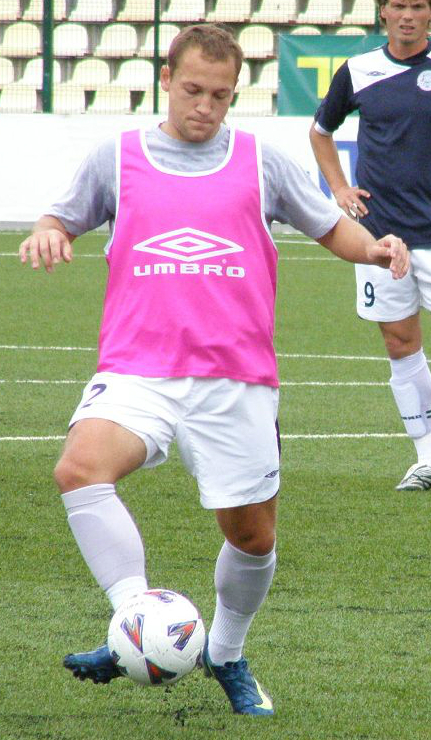

Personal information
- Full name: Anton Yuryevich Kireyev
- Date of birth: 19 July 1983 (age 43)
- Height: 1.73 m (5 ft 8 in)
- Positions: Midfielder; forward

Youth career
- FC MEPhI Moscow
- FC Spartak-2 Moscow

Senior career*
Years	Team	Apps	(Gls)
2001	FC Spartak-Orekhovo Orekhovo-Zuyevo	18	(1)
2003	FC Znamya Truda Orekhovo-Zuyevo	10	(0)
2004	FC Spartak-Avto Moscow		
2005–2006	FC Nara-Desna Naro-Fominsk	41	(2)
2007–2008	FC Zelenograd	44	(3)
2008	FC Lukhovitsy	18	(2)
2009–2010	FC Avangard Podolsk	57	(5)
2011–2012	FC Petrotrest St. Petersburg	42	(3)
2012	FC Ufa	11	(0)
2012–2016	FC Vityaz Podolsk	99	(9)
- * Club domestic league appearances and goals

Anton Yuryevich Kireyev (Russian: Антон Юрьевич Киреев; born 19 July 1983) is a former Russian professional football player.

== Club career ==
He played in the Russian Football National League for FC Ufa in 2012.
