= Andrei Bogomolov =

Kazakhstani football player

Personal information
- Full name: Andrei Bogomolov
- Date of birth: 11 April 1977 (age 49)
- Place of birth: Soviet Union
- Height: 1.83 m (6 ft 0 in)
- Position: Midfielder

Team information
- Current team: Aktobe
- Number: 77

Senior career*
Years	Team	Apps	(Gls)
1993–2002	Yelimay	195	(19)
2002	Zhenis Astana	9	(0)
2003	Yelimay	21	(3)
2004–2006	Kairat	43	(2)
2007–	Aktobe	45	(10)

International career^{‡}
2002–2004	Kazakhstan	5	(0)
- * Club domestic league appearances and goals as of January 2010 ‡ National team caps and goals as of January 2010

Andrei Bogomolov (born 11 April 1977) is a Kazakhstani football player who plays for FC Aktobe in the Kazakhstan Premier League.

He began his career with FC Yelimay Semey, before moving to FC Zhenis Astana, FC Kairat and FC Aktobe.

Bogomolov has made five appearances for the Kazakhstan national football team.
