= Mikhail Muravyov (footballer) =

Russian footballer

Personal information
- Full name: Mikhail Gennadyevich Muravyov
- Date of birth: 6 October 1965 (age 61)
- Height: 1.78 m (5 ft 10 in)
- Position: Forward

Youth career
- FC Saturn Rybinsk

Senior career*
Years	Team	Apps	(Gls)
1988–1991	FC Vympel Rybinsk		
1991	FC Spartak Vladikavkaz	5	(0)
1992	FC Shinnik Yaroslavl	10	(0)
1994	FC Vympel Rybinsk	2	(0)
1997	FC Roda Moscow	36	(12)
1998	FC Kolomna	14	(0)
1999	FC Spartak Lukhovitsy	0	(0)
1999	FC Vostok-Altyn	11	(4)
1999	FC Moskabelmet Moscow (amateur)		
- * Club domestic league appearances and goals

Mikhail Gennadyevich Muravyov (Russian: Михаил Геннадьевич Муравьёв; born 6 October 1965) is a former Russian football player.
