= Dmitri Bolshakov =

Russian footballer

Personal information
- Full name: Dmitri Anatolyevich Bolshakov
- Date of birth: 10 April 1980 (age 46)
- Place of birth: Kamyshin, Russian SFSR
- Height: 1.69 m (5 ft 7 in)
- Position: Midfielder

Senior career*
Years	Team	Apps	(Gls)
1996	FC Avangard Kamyshin		
1997	FC Energiya-d Kamyshin	13	(0)
1998	FC Rotor Kamyshin	8	(0)
2000	FC Balakovo	25	(1)
2003–2004	FC Tekstilshchik Kamyshin	22	(3)
2005	FC Bolat	23	(1)
2006	FC Energetik	22	(1)
2007	FC Irtysh Pavlodar	25	(2)
2008	FC Atyrau	18	(2)
2009–2010	FC Taganrog	42	(0)
2011–2012	FC KUZBASS Kemerovo	35	(3)
- * Club domestic league appearances and goals

Dmitri Anatolyevich Bolshakov (Russian: Дмитрий Анатольевич Большаков; born 10 April 1980) is a former Russian professional footballer.

== Club career ==
He played 4 seasons in the Kazakhstan Premier League
