= Vyacheslav Churikov =

Russian footballer

Personal information
- Full name: Vyacheslav Dmitriyevich Churikov
- Date of birth: 9 January 1970
- Place of birth: Voronezh, Russian SFSR
- Date of death: 2014
- Place of death: Voronezh, Russia
- Height: 1.78 m (5 ft 10 in)
- Position: Midfielder

Youth career
- DYuSSh-14 Kristall Voronezh
- FC Fakel Voronezh

Senior career*
Years	Team	Apps	(Gls)
1990	FC Elektronika Voronezh		
1991–1992	FC Gornyak	35	(2)
1993–1998	FC Fakel Voronezh	151	(8)
1999	FC Lokomotiv Liski	17	(0)
2000	FC Metallurg Lipetsk	14	(0)
2000	FC Lokomotiv Liski	12	(2)
- * Club domestic league appearances and goals

Vyacheslav Dmitriyevich Churikov (Russian: Вячеслав Дмитриевич Чуриков; 9 January 1970 in Voronezh – 2014 in Voronezh) was a Russian football player.
