= Vladimir Kireyev =

Russian footballer

Personal information
- Full name: Vladimir Vladimirovich Kireyev
- Date of birth: 7 January 1972 (age 54)
- Place of birth: Gorky, Russian SFSR
- Height: 1.74 m (5 ft 8 1/2 in)
- Position: Midfielder

Youth career
- DYuSSh-8 Gorky

Senior career*
Years	Team	Apps	(Gls)
1990–1993	FC Lokomotiv Nizhny Novgorod	14	(0)
1994–1995	FC Gornyak	38	(1)
1996	FC Torpedo-Viktoriya Nizhny Novgorod (amateur)		
1996	FC Gornyak	4	(0)
1996	FC Kaisar-Munai	7	(0)
1997	FC Torpedo-Viktoriya Nizhny Novgorod	9	(2)
1997	FC Khimik Dzerzhinsk	15	(2)
1998–1999	FC Torpedo-Viktoriya Nizhny Novgorod	52	(7)
1999	FC Torpedo Pavlovo	15	(0)
2000–2001	FC Torpedo-Viktoriya Nizhny Novgorod	6	(0)
2003–2004	FC Dynamo-GAI Nizhny Novgorod		
- * Club domestic league appearances and goals

Vladimir Vladimirovich Kireyev (Russian: Владимир Владимирович Киреев; born 7 January 1972) is a former Russian football player.
