= Aleksandr Sklyarov =

Kazakhstani footballer

Personal information
- Full name: Aleksandr Valeryevich Sklyarov
- Date of birth: 18 November 1971 (age 54)
- Place of birth: Shymkent, Kazakh SSR
- Height: 1.82 m (5 ft 11 1/2 in)
- Positions: Defender; midfielder

Senior career*
| Years | Team | Apps | (Gls) |
| 1988–1991 | FC Meliorator Chimkent | 103 | (5) |
| 1992–1993 | FC Kairat | 64 | (8) |
| 1993 | FC Zhiger Shymkent | 7 | (0) |
| 1994–1997 | FC Baltika Kaliningrad | 37 | (4) |
| 1994 | → FC Baltika-2 Kaliningrad (loan) | 1 | (0) |
| 1997 | FC Lada-Grad Dimitrovgrad | 8 | (0) |
| 1998 | FC Uralmash Yekaterinburg | 11 | (0) |
| 1999 | FC Kaisar | 10 | (0) |
| 1999 | FC Sintez | 16 | (2) |
| 2000–2001 | FC Baltika Kaliningrad | 24 | (0) |
| 2001 | FC Aktobe Lento | 32 | (1) |
| 2002 | FC Progress Chernyakhovsk (amateur) | | |
| 2003 | FC Taraz | 21 | (1) |
| 2004 | FC Ordabasy | 14 | (0) |

International career
| 1992–1997 | Kazakhstan | 2 | (0) |
- * Club domestic league appearances and goals

Aleksandr Valeryevich Sklyarov (Russian: Александр Валерьевич Скляров; born 18 November 1971) is a former Kazakhstani soccer player.

== Honours ==
Kairat

- Kazakhstan Premier League champion: 1992
- Kazakhstan Cup winner: 1992

Kaisar

- Kazakhstan Cup winner: 1998–99
