= Yevgeni Tarasov =

Kazakhstani footballer

Personal information
- Full name: Yevgeni Aleksandrovich Tarasov
- Date of birth: 25 March 1979 (age 47)
- Place of birth: Karaganda, Kazakh SSR
- Height: 1.78 m (5 ft 10 in)
- Position: Striker

Team information
- Current team: Caspiy (assistant)

Senior career*
Years	Team	Apps	(Gls)
1997–2000	FC Kairat	11	(2)
2000–2002	FC Zenit St. Petersburg	16	(4)
2002–2003	FC Sokol Saratov	16	(0)
2004	FC Lisma-Mordovia Saransk	11	(0)
2006	FC Shakhter Karagandy	1	(0)
2006	FC Esil Bogatyr	11	(2)

International career
2001–2003	Kazakhstan	6	(1)

Managerial career
- 2013–2022: Zenit St. Petersburg (academy)
- 2022–: Caspiy (assistant)
- * Club domestic league appearances and goals

Yevgeni Aleksandrovich Tarasov (Russian: Евгений Александрович Тарасов; born 25 March 1979) is a Kazakhstani professional football coach and a former player. He is an assistant manager of Caspiy.

== Club career ==
He made his professional debut in the Kazakhstan Premier League in 1997 for FC Kairat. He played 3 games and scored 2 goals in the UEFA Intertoto Cup 2000 for FC Zenit St. Petersburg.

== Honours ==
- Russian Premier League bronze: 2001.
- Russian Cup finalist: 2002.
