= Askhat Kadyrkulov =

Kazakhstani footballer (born 1974)

Ashkat Kadyrkulov
Personal information
- Date of birth: 14 November 1974 (age 51)
- Place of birth: Uzynagash, Kazakh SSR
- Height: 1.78 m (5 ft 10 in)
- Position: Midfielder

Senior career*
Years	Team	Apps	(Gls)
1990–1991	FC Ak-kanat Uzynagash	13	(1)
1993	FC Namys Almaty	28	(2)
1994–2000	FC Kairat	145	(26)
2000	FC Shakhter Karagandy	3	(0)
2000–2001	PFC CSKA Moscow	9	(1)
2000	→ PFC CSKA-d Moscow	6	(1)
2002	FC Zhenis	9	(1)
2003–2004	FC Kairat	28	(2)
2005	FC Shakhter Karagandy	22	(0)
2006	FC Kairat	20	(0)
2007	FC Zhetysu	11	(1)

International career
1997–2002	Kazakhstan	15	(4)
- * Club domestic league appearances and goals

Askhat Kadyrkulov (Russian: Асхат Кадыркулов; born 14 November 1974) is a former Kazakhstani professional footballer.

== Club career ==
He made his professional debut in the Soviet Second League B in 1990 for FC Ak-kanat Uzynagash. He played two games in the 2000–01 UEFA Cup for PFC CSKA Moscow.

== Career statistics ==
=== International goals ===
#	Date	Venue	Opponent	Score	Result	Competition
1.	6 April 2000	Al-Sadd Stadium, Doha, Qatar	Palestine	2–0	Won	1998 AFC Asian Cup Qual.
2.	28 May 2000	King Abdullah Stadium, Amman, Jordan	Palestine	3–2	Won	2000 WAFF Championship
3.	28 May 2000	King Abdullah Stadium, Amman, Jordan	Palestine	3–2	Won	2000 WAFF Championship
4.	21 April 2001	Al-Shaab Stadium, Baghdad, Iraq	Nepal	6–0	Won	2002 FIFA WC Qual.
Correct as of 7 October 2016
