= Askar Abildaev =

Kazakhstani footballer

Personal information
- Full name: Askar Zubaidildaevich Abildaev
- Date of birth: 16 June 1971 (age 55)
- Place of birth: Soviet Union
- Position: Forward

Senior career*
Years	Team	Apps	(Gls)
1988–1991	Shakhter Karagandy	69	(12)
1991–1993	Kairat	75	(35)
1994	Ansat Pavlodar	26	(14)
1995–1997	Shakhter Karagandy	64	(23)

International career
1992–1996	Kazakhstan	7	(1)

Managerial career
- 2008–2010: FC Shakhter (executive director)
- 2016—2017: FC Shakhter (executive director)
- 2017–2018: FC Caspiy (director)
- 2022: FC Astana (advisor to director general)
- * Club domestic league appearances and goals

Askar Abildaev (Kazakh: Асқар Зубайдуллаұлы Әбілдаев; Russian: Аскар Абильдаев; born 16 June 1971) is a retired Kazakh football forward.

== Club career ==
In Soviet times He started playing football at the age of nine. At this age, he began to train in the training group of Shakhter Karagandy.

He played his debut match for Shakhter Karagandy in 1986.

After playing three seasons at Shakhter, in 1991 he was exchanged to Kairat for Vladimir Minkin.

After the collapse of the USSR

After the collapse of the Soviet Union, Abildaev became the champion of Kazakhstan and the owner of the Cup of Kazakhstan in the first year of his stay at Kairat.

After "Kairat" in 1994, Abildaev moved to the Ansat Pavlodar. After playing one season at Ansat, he returned to his native Shakhter Karagandy, where he ended his career.

== International career ==
Abildayev made his debut in the main national team of Kazakhstan on 1 June 1992 in a match against Turkmenistan. He scored his first and only goal for the national team in a match against the same Turkmenistan on 14 September 1992. In general, Abildaev played 7 matches for the national team and scored 1 goal.

== Managerial career ==
Served as executive director of Shakhtar Karaganda from 2008 to 2010 and from 2016 to 2017

From 2017 to 2018 held the post of Director of Kaspi Football Club.

From September 2022 to November 2022 served as Advisor to the General Director of FC Astana.
