= Ruslan Duzmambetov =

Kazakhstani footballer and referee

Personal information
- Full name: Ruslan Belemkhanovich Duzmambetov
- Date of birth: 21 April 1968 (age 58)
- Place of birth: Ust-Kamenogorsk, Kazakh SSR, USSR
- Position: Forward

Youth career
- DSYUSH Ust-Kamenogorsk

Senior career*
Years	Team	Apps	(Gls)
1984–1992	Vostok	146	(45)
1993	Ansat	32	(8)
1993–1998	Vostok	154	(59)
1999	Shakhter-Ispat-Karmet	14	(1)
1999	Kokshe	0	(0)
2000	Vostok-Altyn	21	(5)
2000	Taraz	4	(2)

International career^{‡}
1992–1996	Kazakhstan	4	(2)
- * Club domestic league appearances and goals as of 4 March 2016 ‡ National team caps and goals as of 7 March 2014

Ruslan Duzmambetov
- Full name: Ruslan Belemkhanovich Duzmambetov
- Born: 21 April 1968 (age 58); Ust-Kamenogorsk, Kazakh SSR, USSR

Domestic
Years	League	Role
2001–	Kazakhstan Premier League	Referee; Linesman

Ruslan Belemkhanovich Duzmambetov (Russian: Руслан Белемханович Дузмамбетов; born 21 April 1968) is a Kazakhstani football referee and a former player.

== Career statistics ==
=== Club ===
As of match played 8 November 2015.

Club	Season	League		Cup		Asia		Other		Total	
Club	Season	Apps	Goals	Apps	Goals	Apps	Goals	Apps	Goals	Apps	Goals
Vostok
Vostok	1984	6	0	–		–		–		6	0
Vostok	1985	21	0	–		–		–		21	0
Vostok	1986	1	0	–		–		–		1	0
Vostok	1989	12	0	–		–		–		12	0
Vostok	1990	34	11	–		–		–		34	11
Vostok	1991	37	16	–		–		–		37	16
Vostok	1992	32	16	3	2	–		–		35	18
Vostok	1993	7	3	1	1	–		–		8	4
Vostok	1994	29	9	5	0	–		–		34	9
Vostok	1995	29	14	2	0	2	1	1	0	34	15
Vostok	1996	29	8	5	2	–		–		34	10
Vostok	1997	21	10	2	0	–		–		23	10
Vostok	1998	19	10	2	1	–		–		21	11
Vostok	2000	18	5	3	0	–		–		21	5
Vostok	Total	295	102	23	6	2	1	1	0	321	109
Ansat	1993	30	8	2	0	–		–		32	8
Ansat	Total	30	8	2	0	–		–		32	8
Shakhter-Ispat-Karmet	1999	12	1	2	0	–		–		13	1
Shakhter-Ispat-Karmet	Total	12	1	2	0	–		–		13	1
Kokshe	1999	–		–		–		–		0	0
Kokshe	Total	–		–		–		–		0	0
Taraz	2000	4	2	–		–		–		4	2
Taraz	Total	4	2	–		–		–		4	2
Career totals		341	113	27	6	2	1	1	0	370	120

=== International ===
As of match played 10 October 2015.

National team	Year	Apps	Goals
Kazakhstan	1992	3	2
Kazakhstan	1996	1	0
Kazakhstan	Total	4	2

==== International goals ====
#	Date	Venue	Opponent	Score	Result	Competition
1	16 July 1992	Central Stadium, Almaty, Kazakhstan	Uzbekistan	1–0	1–0	Friendly
2	14 October 1992	Pakhtakor Stadium, Tashkent, Uzbekistan	Uzbekistan	0–1	1–1	Friendly
Correct as of 13 January 2017
