= Kazhymukan Munaitpasov Stadium (Astana) =

Sports venue in Kazakhstan

Coordinates: 51°09′46″N 71°24′48″E

Kajymukan Munaitpasov Stadium
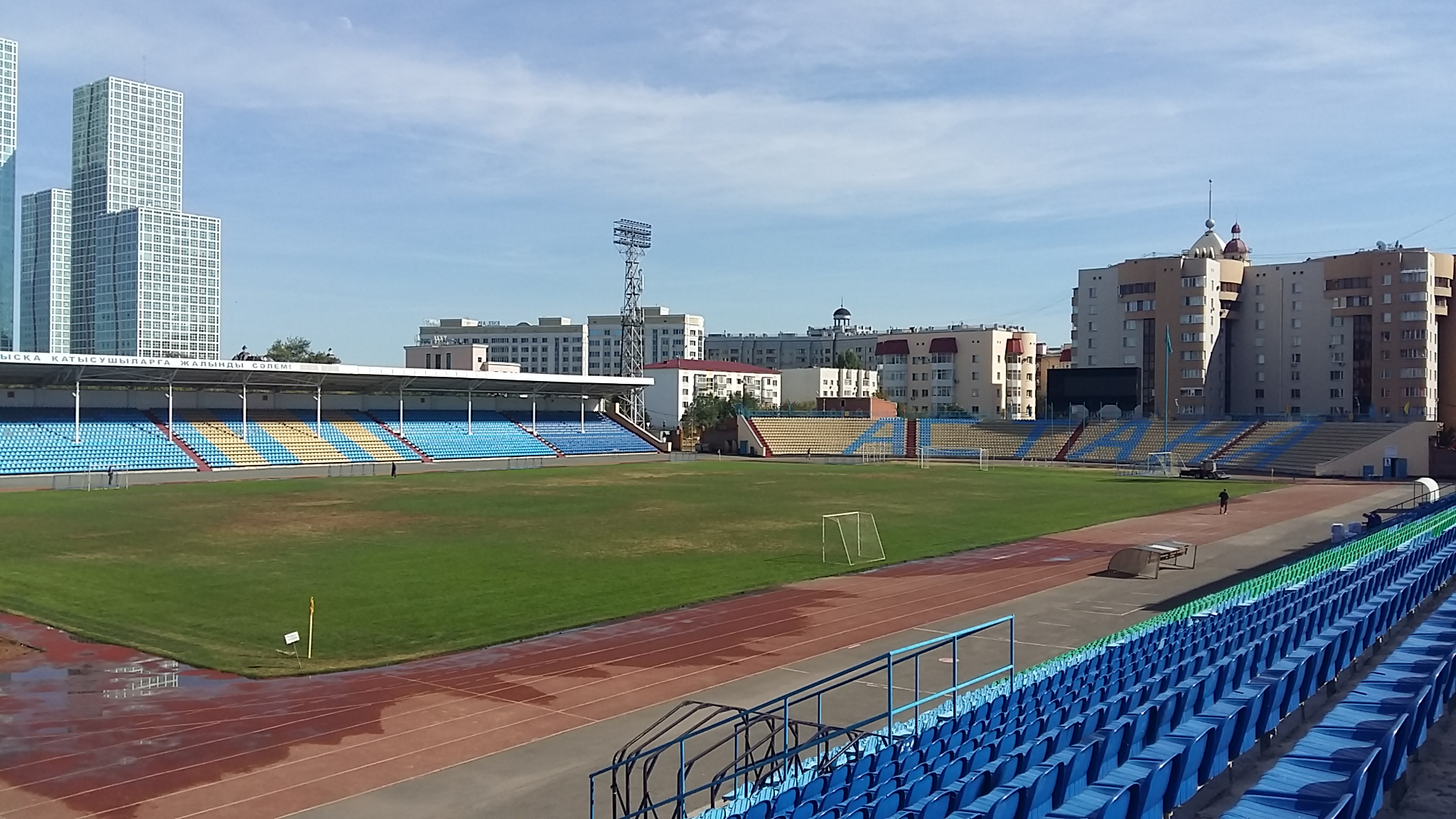
- Interactive map of Kajymukan Munaitpasov Stadium
- Location: Astana, Kazakhstan
- Owner: Municipality of Astana
- Capacity: 12,350
- Surface: Grass
- Field size: 104x72

Construction
- Opened: 1938

Tenant
- FC Astana-64

Kajymukan Munaitpasov Stadium (Kazakh: Қажымұқан Мұңайтпасов стадион, Qajymuqan Muńaıtpasov stadıon) is a multi-purpose stadium in Astana, Kazakhstan. It is named after the Kazakh wrestler Kazhymukan Munaitpasov. He was the first Kazakh who became a world champion. The stadium is currently used mostly for association football matches and is the home stadium of FC Zhenis. The stadium holds 12,350 people.
