= Ruslan Imankulov =

Kazakhstani footballer

Personal information
- Full name: Ruslan Imankulov
- Date of birth: 2 February 1972 (age 54)
- Position: Forward

Senior career*
Years	Team	Apps	(Gls)
1992–2005	Shakhter Karagandy	366	(99)

International career^{‡}
1995–1996	Kazakhstan	3	(1)
- * Club domestic league appearances and goals as of 13 November 2011 ‡ National team caps and goals as of 17 April 2014

Ruslan Imankulov (born 2 February 1972) is a retired Kazakh footballer who played as a forward.

== Career ==
Imankulov spent most of his career playing for FC Shakhter Karagandy, for whom he scored 99 goals over 14 seasons, the fourth most in the history of the Kazakhstan Premier League.

== International career ==
Imankulov made three appearances for the Kazakhstan, making his debut on 27 December 1995 against Kuwait, scoring one goal.

== International goals ==
#	Date	Venue	Opponent	Score	Result	Competition
1.	3 January 1996	Beirut Municipal Stadium, Lebanon	Lebanon	0–1	2–1	Friendly
