= Pavel Yevteyev =

Kazakhstani footballer

Personal information
- Full name: Pavel Yevteyev
- Date of birth: 23 June 1967 (age 59)
- Place of birth: Ust-Kamenogorsk, USSR
- Height: 1.74 m (5 ft 8 1/2 in)
- Position: Midfielder

Senior career*
Years	Team	Apps	(Gls)
1984–1991	Vostok Ust-Kamenogorsk		
1992–1999	Vostok Oskemen		
2000–2001	Zhenis Astana		
2002	FC Shakhter Karagandy		
2003	Vostok Oskemen		

International career^{‡}
1996–1998	Kazakhstan	16	(3)
- * Club domestic league appearances and goals as of 11 June 2008 ‡ National team caps and goals as of 11 June 2008

Pavel Yevteyev (born 23 June 1967) is a retired football midfielder from Kazakhstan. He obtained 16 caps for the Kazakhstan national football team during his career, scoring three goals.

== Career statistics ==
=== International goals ===
#	Date	Venue	Opponent	Score	Result	Competition
1.	11 October 1997	Central Stadium, Almaty, Kazakhstan	South Korea	1–1	Draw	1998 World Cup qual.
2.	18 October 1997	Central Stadium, Almaty, Kazakhstan	United Arab Emirates	3–0	Win	1998 World Cup qual.
3.	8 November 1997	National Stadium, Tokyo, Japan	Japan	5–1	Loss	1998 World Cup qual.
Correct as of 13 January 2017
