= Sultan Abildayev =

Kazakhstani footballer

Personal information
- Full name: Sultan Tokatayuly Abildayev
- Date of birth: 21 March 1970 (age 56)
- Place of birth: Kyzylorda, Soviet Union
- Height: 1.76 m (5 ft 9 in)
- Position: Midfielder

Senior career*
Years	Team	Apps	(Gls)
1988–1989	Meliorator	47	(0)
1990–1993	Kaisar	134	(14)
1993–1995	Ansat Pavlodar	69	(14)
1996	Kairat	9	(0)
1996–1998	Irtysh Pavlodar	55	(1)
1999–2001	Kaisar	83	(15)
2002	Atyrau	20	(1)
2002–2005	Kaisar	66	(9)

International career
1992	Kazakhstan	3	(0)

Managerial career
- 2006–2009: Kaisar (assistant)
- 2009: Kaisar (caretaker)
- 2010–2011: Kaisar (assistant)
- 2012: Kaisar (conditioning)
- 2013–2014: Kaisar (assistant)
- 2014–2015: Kaisar (conditioning)
- 2015: Kaisar (caretaker)
- 2015–2016: Kaisar (conditioning)
- 2016: Kaisar
- 2017–2019: Baikonur
- 2020–2021: Kaisar
- * Club domestic league appearances and goals

Sultan Tokatayuly Abildayev (Kazakh: Сұлтан Тоқатайұлы Әбілдаев; born 21 March 1970) is a Kazakh football manager and a former midfielder.

== Club career ==
Abildayev spent most of his career with FC Irtysh Pavlodar and FC Kaisar in the Kazakhstan Premier League.

== International career ==
Abildayev made three appearances for the Kazakhstan national football team in 1992.
