= Kazakhstan Cup =

- Organiser(s): Football Federation of Kazakhstan
- Founded: 1992; 34 years ago
- Region: Kazakhstan
- Teams: 32 (2024)
- Qualifier for: UEFA Europa League
- Domestic cup: Kazakhstan Super Cup
- Current champions: Ordabasy (3rd title)
- Most championships: Kairat (10 titles)
- 2026 Kazakhstan Cup

The Kazakhstan Cup is the main knockout cup competition in Kazakhstan football, run by the Football Federation of Kazakhstan. The tournament was initially founded in 1936 as a competition for clubs in the Kazakh SSR but did not become a proper national competition until 1992.

== Winners of Kazakh SSR Cup (1936–1991) ==
Note: the tournament was irregular during the Soviet period and was not contested every season. Kazakh teams in the Soviet league pyramid didn't take part in the tournament.

Year – Winner	Year – Winner
1936 – Dinamo Almaty	1967 – Gornyak Zhezkazgan
1937 – Not Held	1968 – Torpedo Tselinograd
1938 – Dinamo Almaty	1969 – Teplovoznik Zhambyl
1939 – Dinamo Almaty	1970 – Bulat Temirtau
1940 – Dinamo Almaty	1971 – Gornyak Nikol'skiy
1941–47 – Not Held	1972 – Bulat Temirtau
1948 – Dinamo Karagandy	1973 – Bulat Temirtau
1949 – Dinamo Shymkent	1974 – Bulat Temirtau
1950 – Dinamo Zhambyl	1975 – Bulat Temirtau
1951 – Dinamo Almaty	1976 – Bulat Temirtau
1952 – Stroitel' Oskemen	1977 – Trud Shevchenko
1953 – Not Held	1978 – Trud Shevchenko
1954 – Dinamo Almaty	1979 – Vostokmash Oskemen
1955 – Metallurg Shymkent	1980 – Liteyshchik Karagandy
1956 – Not Held	1981 – Alyuminshchik Pavlodar
1957 – Spartak Almaty	1982 – Not Held
1958 – Stroitel' Pavlodar	1983 – Spartak Semey
1959 – Spartak Almaty	1984 – Meliorator Shymkent
1960 – Avangard Petropavl	1985 – Meliorator Shymkent
1961 – Torpedo Oskemen	1986 – Tselinnik Tselinograd
1962 – Torpedo Oskemen	1987 – Meliorator Shymkent
1963 – Torpedo Oskemen	1988 – Traktor Pavlodar
1964 – Stroitel' Shevchenko	1989 – Ekibaztuzets
1965 – ADK Almaty	1990 – Montazhnik Turkestan
1966 – Altay Oskemen	1991 – Aktyubinets Aktobe

== Finals of Kazakhstan Cup since Independence (1992–present) ==
Season	Winner	Runner-up	Score	Venue
1992	Kairat	Taraz (Fosfor)	5–1	Central Stadium, Almaty
1993	Dostyk^{†}	Taraz (Fosfor)	4–2	Central Stadium, Almaty
1994	Vostok	Aktobe (Aktyubinets)	1–0	Central Stadium, Almaty
1995	Semey (Yelimay)	Ordabasy (SKIF Ordabasy)	1–0	Central Stadium, Almaty
1996–97	Kairat	Vostok (Vostok-Adil)	2–0	Central Stadium, Almaty
1997–98	Irtysh	Kaisar (Kaisar-Hurricane)	2–1	Central Stadium, Almaty
1998–99	Kaisar (Kaisar-Hurricane)	Vostok (Vostok-Altyn)	1–1 (a.e.t.) 2–0 (p)	Central Stadium, Almaty
1999–2000	Kairat	Kyzylzhar (Access-Golden Grain)	5–0	Kazhymukan Munaitpasov, Astana
2000–01	Astana-64 (Zhenis)	Irtysh	1–1 (a.e.t.) 5–4 (p)	Kazhymukan Munaitpasov, Astana
2001	Kairat	Astana-64 (Zhenis)	3–1	Central Stadium, Almaty
2002	Astana-64 (Zhenis)	Irtysh	1–0	Central Stadium, Almaty
2003	Kairat	Tobol	3–1	Central Stadium, Almaty
2004	Taraz	Kairat	1–0	Central Stadium, Almaty
2005	Astana-64 (Zhenis)	Kairat	2–1	Central Stadium, Almaty
2006	Alma-Ata	Astana-64 (Astana)	3–1	Central Stadium, Almaty
2007	Tobol	Ordabasy	3–0	Taraz Central Stadium, Taraz
2008	Aktobe	Alma-Ata	3–1	Central Stadium, Almaty
2009	Atyrau	Shakhter	1–0	Astana Arena, Astana
2010	Astana (Lokomotiv)	Shakhter	1–0	Astana Arena, Astana
2011	Ordabasy	Tobol	1–0	Central Stadium, Almaty
2012	Astana	Irtysh	2–0	Astana Arena, Astana
2013	Shakhter	Taraz	1–0	Astana Arena, Astana
2014	Kairat	Aktobe	4–1	Astana Arena, Astana
2015	Kairat	Astana	2–1	Astana Arena, Astana
2016	Astana	Kairat	1–0	Central Stadium, Almaty
2017	Kairat	Atyrau	1–0	Central Stadium, Aktobe
2018	Kairat	Atyrau	1–0	Astana Arena, Astana
2019	Kaisar	Atyrau	2–1 (a.e.t.)	Astana Arena, Nur-Sultan
2020	Cancelled due to the COVID-19 pandemic.			
2021	Kairat	Shakhter	3–3 (a.e.t.) 9–8 (p)	Astana Arena, Astana
2022	Ordabasy	Akzhayik	5–4 (a.e.t.)	Astana Arena, Astana
2023	Tobol	Ordabasy	1–0	Astana Arena, Astana
2024	Aktobe	Atyrau	2–1	Central Stadium, Almaty
2025	Tobol	Ordabasy	2–0	Gani Muratbayev Stadium, Kyzylorda
2026	Ordabasy	Kaisar	4–1	Turkistan Arena, Turkistan

Notes:

- † Defunct teams.
- Historical names shown in brackets according to the season.

== Performance ==
=== Performances by club ===
Club	Champions	Runners-up	Winning years	Runners-up years
Kairat	10	3	1992, 1996–97, 1999–2000, 2001, 2003, 2014, 2015, 2017, 2018, 2021	2004, 2005, 2016
Astana-1964	3	2	2000–01, 2002, 2005	2001, 2006
Tobol	3	2	2007, 2023, 2025	2003, 2011
Ordabasy	3	4	2011, 2022, 2026	1995, 2007, 2023, 2025
Astana	3	1	2010, 2012, 2016	2015
Aktobe	2	2	2008, 2024	1994, 2014
Kaisar	2	2	1998–99, 2019	1997–98, 2026
Irtysh	1	3	1997–98	2000–01, 2002, 2012
Taraz	1	3	2004	1992, 1993, 2013
Atyrau	1	4	2009	2017, 2018, 2019, 2024
Shakhter	1	3	2013	2009, 2010, 2021
Vostok	1	2	1994	1996–97, 1998–99
Alma-Ata	1	1	2006	2008
Dostyk	1	—	1993	—
Spartak	1	—	1995	—

=== Performances by city ===
City	Winners	Club(s)
Almaty	12	Kairat (10), Dostyk (1), FC Alma-Ata (1)
Astana	6	Astana-64 (3), Astana (3)
Kostanay	3	Tobol (3)
Kyzylorda	2	Kaisar (2)
Shymkent	2	Ordabasy (2)
Aktobe	2	Aktobe (2)
Atyrau	1	Atyrau (1)
Karagandy	1	Shakhter (1)
Oskemen	1	Vostok (1)
Pavlodar	1	Irtysh (1)
Semey	1	Spartak (1)
Taraz	1	Taraz (1)
