= Pavlodar Central Stadium =

Stadium in Kazakhstan

Coordinates: 52°16′35″N 76°56′59″E

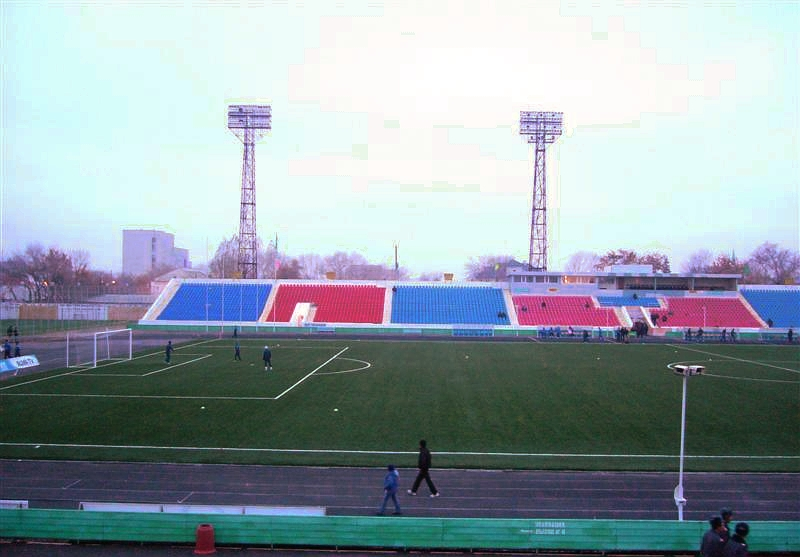
- Pavlodar Central Stadium in 2007
- Interactive map of Pavlodar Central Stadium
- Former names: Traktor Stadium
- Location: Pavlodar, Kazakhstan
- Owner: Municipality of Pavlodar
- Capacity: 11,828
- Surface: Grass; 105m x 68m

Construction
- Opened: 1947
- Renovated: 2001, 2007, 2020

Tenant
- FC Irtysh

Pavlodar Central Stadium (Kazakh: Орталық стадион, Ortalyq stadion) is a multi-purpose stadium in Pavlodar, Kazakhstan. The former name of the stadium was "Traktor". It is currently used mostly for football matches and is the home stadium of FC Irtysh.

== History ==
The football arena has been in use since 1947. "Central" was refurbished in 2001, 2007 and 2015.

In the 2007–2008 season, the outdated scoreboard was replaced with a new LCD monitor, with the ability to display match moments and reports from other games. Since the 2009–2010 season, the Irtysh team has had a heated playing field on which to train. The stadium has met UEFA standards since the construction work.

== Reconstruction ==
During the reconstruction the following works were carried out:

In the year 2001:

- Construction of parking spaces
- Extension of crew changing rooms and a conference room
- Large scale renovation of the football pitch
- Reconstruction of the lawn irrigation system
- Restoration of the six light poles
- Refurbishment of public toilets

In the year 2007:

- Replacement of natural grass with an artificial turf with drainage system from the Netherlands
- Construction of a small stadium
- Reconstruction of the west, north and east stands according to UEFA standards.
- Renovation of the VIP lounge
- Paving of running tracks

The stadium has a pitch of 105×68 metres and a capacity of 11,828 spectators.

== Images ==
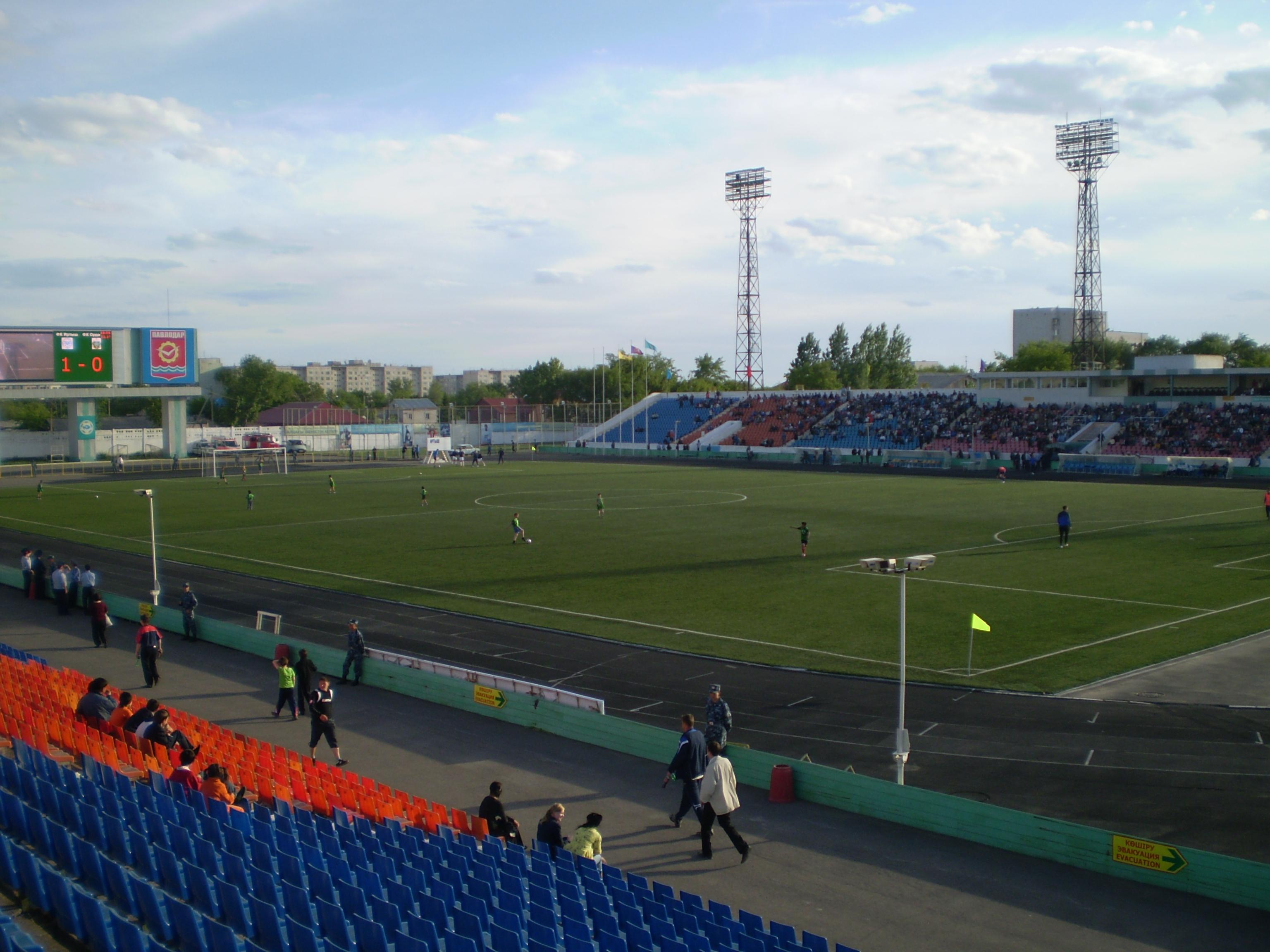
Central Stadium Pavlador, Kazakhstan. 20 May 2009, Game between „Irtysh“ and „Ordabasy“.

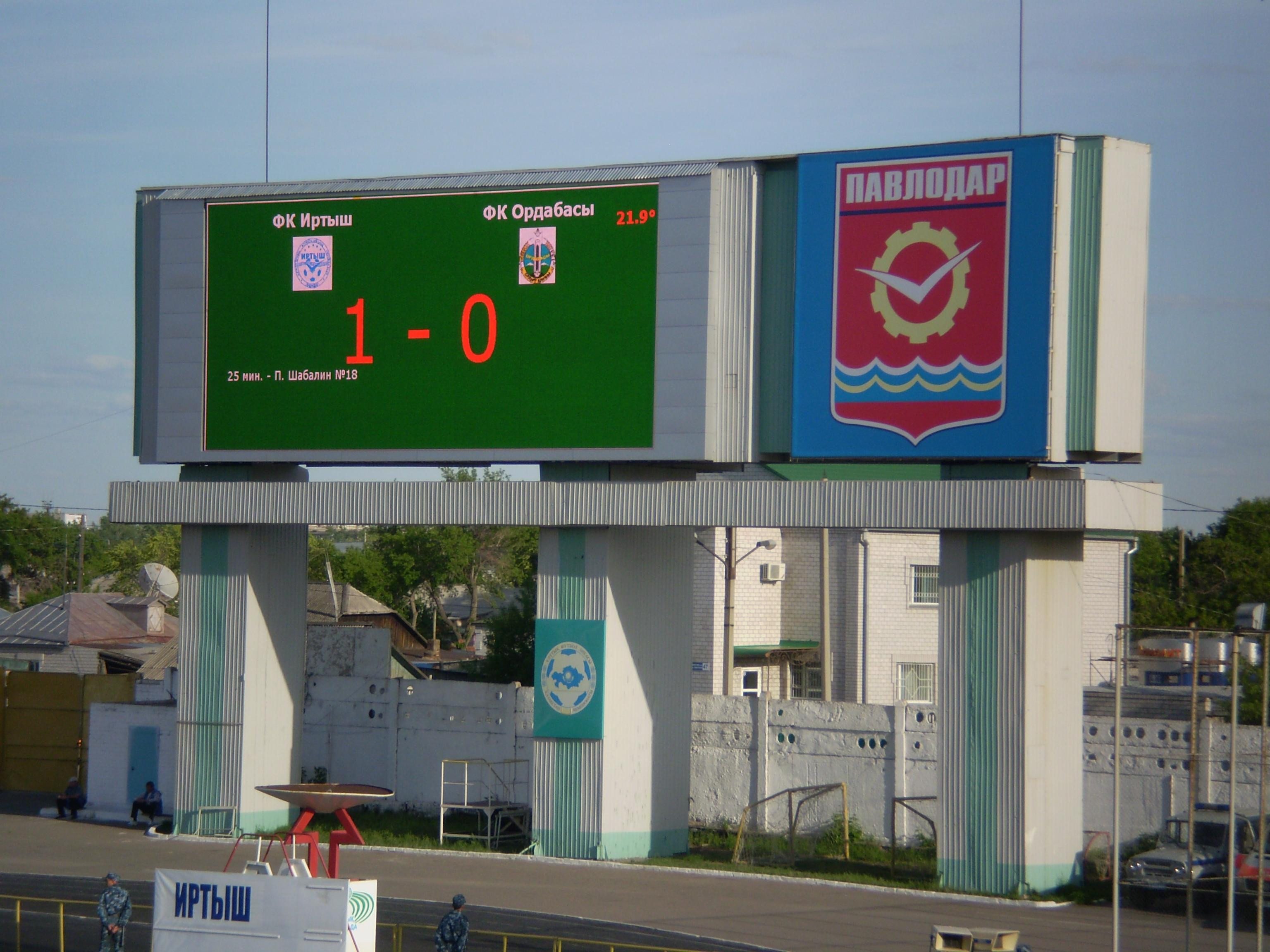
Stadium information board. 20 May 2009.

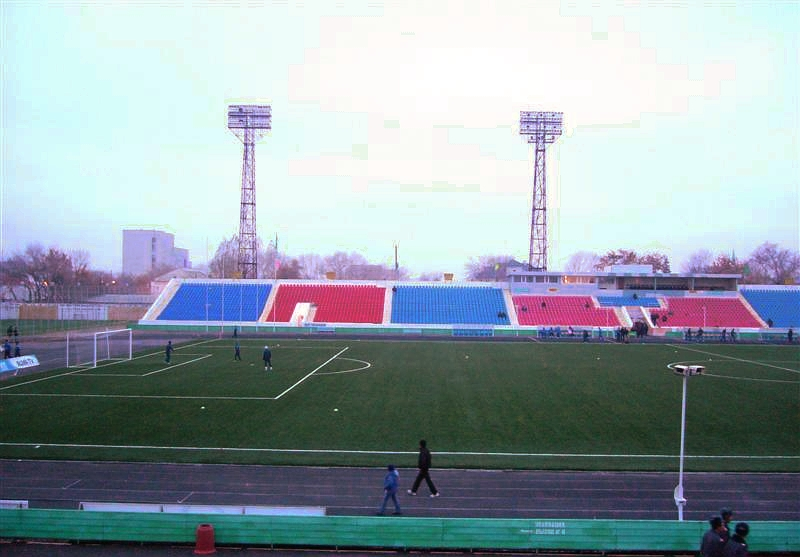
View of the stadium from 2 November 2007
