= Vostok Stadium =

Coordinates: 49°58′12″N 82°35′13″E

- Interactive map of Vostok Stadium
- Location: Oskemen, Kazakhstan
- Owner: Municipality of Oskemen
- Capacity: 8,500
- Surface: Grass; 104m x 68m

Construction
- Opened: 1963

Tenant
- FC Vostok

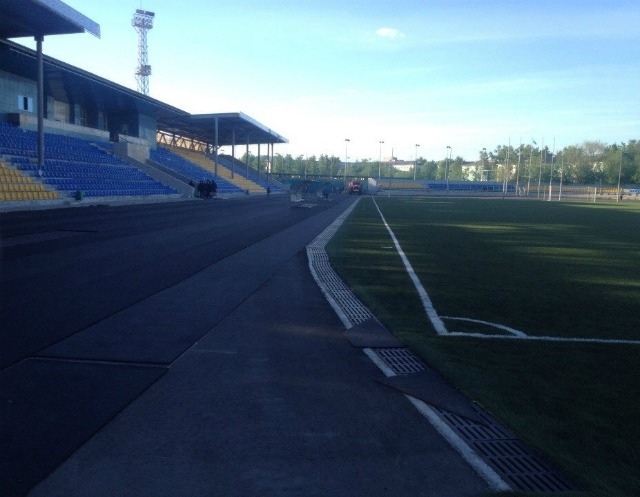
An image of Vostok Stadium from the inside.

Vostok Stadium is a multi-use stadium in Oskemen, Kazakhstan. It is currently used mostly for football matches and is the home stadium of FC Vostok.

== History ==
Stadium "Vostok" is the largest sports facility in Ust-Kamenogorsk. It was inaugurated in 1963. It has a capacity for 8,500 spectators.

It is mainly used for soccer matches, sometimes it is used as a concert venue. It is the home arena for the local soccer team Vostok.

Since 2005, the issue of required repairs due to deterioration has been resolved. In 2010, the Akimat of Ust-Kamenogorsk decided to reconstruct the stadium to meet UEFA standards, spending 600 million KZT on the reconstruction. In August 2010, new benches were installed in the stands.
