= Vladimir Loginov (footballer) =

Kazakhstani footballer

Personal information
- Full name: Vladimir Loginov
- Date of birth: 5 January 1974 (age 52)
- Place of birth: Kazakhstan
- Height: 1.82 m (5 ft 11 1/2 in)
- Position: Forward

Senior career*
Years	Team	Apps	(Gls)
1992–1995	FC Uralets Uralsk		
1995–2001	FC Kaisar Kyzylorda		
2002–2005	FC Aktobe Lento		
2006	FC Energetik Pavlodar		

International career^{‡}
1996–2001	Kazakhstan	23	(3)
- * Club domestic league appearances and goals as of 11 June 2008 ‡ National team caps and goals as of 11 June 2008

Vladimir Loginov (born 5 January 1974) is a retired football forward from Kazakhstan. He obtained a total number of 23 caps for the Kazakhstan national football team during his career, scoring two goals.

== Career statistics ==
=== International goals ===
#	Date	Venue	Opponent	Score	Result	Competition
1.	6 June 1997	Al-Shaab Stadium, Baghdad, Iraq	Iraq	1–2	Won	1998 FIFA WC Qual.
2.	11 June 1997	Railway Stadium, Lahore, Pakistan	Pakistan	0–7	Won	1998 FIFA WC Qual.
3.	29 June 1997	Central Stadium, Almaty, Kazakhstan	Iraq	3–1	Won	1998 FIFA WC Qual.
Correct as of 7 October 2016
