= 2026 FC Astana season =

FC Astana
2026 season
- Chairman: Sayan Khamitzhanov
- Manager: Grigori Babayan
- Stadium: Astana Arena
- Premier League: 3rd
- Kazakhstan Cup: Round of 16 vs Tobol
- Conference League: First qualifying round vs Dinamo City
- Top goalscorer: League: Marin Tomasov (11); All: Marin Tomasov (11)
- Highest home attendance: 28,235 vs Kairat (17 September 2026)
- Lowest home attendance: 4,560 vs Kyzylzhar (9 May 2026)
- Average home league attendance: 10,536 (25 October 2026)

The 2026 FC Astana season was the eighteenth successive season that FC Astana played in the Kazakhstan Premier League, the highest tier of association football in Kazakhstan.

== Season events ==
On 30 January, Russian Premier League club Krylia Sovetov announced the signing of Geoffrey Chinedu from Astana.

On 8 February, Aktobe announced the season-long loan signing of Arman Kenesov from Astana.

On 19 February, Russian Premier League club Rubin Kazan announced the signing of Nazmi Gripshi from Astana.

On 5 March, Astana announced that Aleksa Amanović had left the club to sign for Ordabasy.

On 19 June, Astana announced the signing of Aleksandr Merkel from Zhenis.

On 30 June, Nurali Zhaksylykov joined Kaisar on loan for the remainder of the season.

On 7 July, Astana announced the signing of free-agent Ivan Miladinović, and the loan signing of Damir Marat from Tobol until the end of the season.

On 20 July, Astana announced the signing of Nikola Burić from Egnatia Rrogozhinë.

== Squad ==
As of match played 31 October 2026

No.	Name	Nationality	Position	Date of birth (age)	Signed from	Signed in	Contract ends	Apps.	Goals
Goalkeepers
61	Imran Tulakbaev	(Kazakhstan)	GK	3 January 2005 (aged 21)	Academy	2026		0	0
74	Mukhammedzhan Seysen	(Kazakhstan)	GK	14 February 1999 (aged 27)	Unattached	2024		44	0
90	Miras Amangeldi	(Kazakhstan)	GK	31 May 2005 (aged 21)	Academy	2026		0	0
93	Josip Čondrić	(Croatia)	GK	27 August 1993 (aged 33)	Zrinjski Mostar	2023		91	0
99	Danila Karpikov	(Kazakhstan)	GK	15 October 2003 (aged 23)	Shakhter Karagandy	2025		1	0
Defenders
2	Karlo Bartolec	(Croatia)	DF	20 April 1995 (aged 31)	Lokomotiva Zagreb	2024		86	8
3	Branimir Kalaica	(Croatia)	DF	1 June 1998 (aged 28)	Lokomotiva Zagreb	2024	2026	77	5
4	Sanzhar Anuarov	(Kazakhstan)	DF	16 February 2005 (aged 21)	Academy	2023		12	1
5	Kipras Kažukolovas	(Lithuania)	DF	20 November 2000 (aged 25)	Žalgiris	2024		78	3
6	Alibek Kasym	(Kazakhstan)	DF	27 May 1998 (aged 28)	Aktobe	2026		22	2
11	Yan Vorogovsky	(Kazakhstan)	DF	7 August 1996 (aged 30)	RWD Molenbeek	2023	2026	107	4
15	Abzal Beysebekov	(Kazakhstan)	DF	30 November 1992 (aged 33)	Vostok	2012		472	20
45	Ivan Miladinović	(Serbia)	DF	14 August 1994 (aged 32)	Unattached	2026		7	0
52	Timur Tokenov	(Kazakhstan)	DF	24 April 2004 (aged 22)	Academy	2023		2	0
70	Nursat Nurmukhambet	(Kazakhstan)	DF	26 January 2007 (aged 19)	Academy	2026		2	0
77	Dmitry Shomko	(Kazakhstan)	DF	19 March 1990 (aged 35)	Elimai	2025		306	13
91	Aytuar Token	(Kazakhstan)	DF	3 September 2006 (aged 20)	Academy	2026		3	0
Midfielders
7	Dinmukhamed Karaman	(Kazakhstan)	DF	26 June 2000 (aged 26)	Zhenis	2026		32	0
8	Ivan Bašić	(Bosnia and Herzegovina)	MF	30 April 2002 (aged 24)	Unattached	2025		39	6
9	Bauyrzhan Islamkhan	(Kazakhstan)	MF	23 February 1993 (aged 33)	Turan	2025		40	5
10	Marin Tomasov	(Croatia)	MF	31 August 1987 (aged 39)	Rijeka	2018		328	133
17	Damir Marat	(Kazakhstan)	FW	5 November 2000 (aged 25)	on loan from Tobol	2026	2026	7	0
21	Aleksandr Merkel	(Kazakhstan)	MF	22 February 1992 (aged 34)	Zhenis	2026		14	0
47	Maksat Abrayev	(Kazakhstan)	MF	13 February 2008 (aged 18)	Academy	2026		29	3
75	Arman Vardanyan	(Kazakhstan)	MF	27 September 2005 (aged 21)	Gandzasar	2026		0	0
82	Ruslan Valikhan	(Kazakhstan)	MF	26 January 2008 (aged 18)	Academy	2026		2	0
Forwards
20	Nnamdi Ahanonu	(Nigeria)	FW	22 February 2002 (aged 24)	Skënderbeu Korçë	2024	2026	35	3
29	Nikola Burić	(Croatia)	FW	1 October 1996 (aged 30)	Egnatia Rrogozhinë	2024		12	1
57	Akhmetali Kaltanov	(Kazakhstan)	FW	19 April 2006 (aged 20)	Academy	2023		5	1
71	Anuar Tolendi	(Kazakhstan)	FW	19 December 2010 (aged 15)	Academy	2026		1	0
72	Stanislav Basmanov	(Kazakhstan)	FW	24 June 2001 (aged 25)	Academy	2020		128	15
81	Ramazan Karimov	(Kazakhstan)	FW	5 July 1999 (aged 27)	Maktaaral	2024		107	15
89	Arsen Akhmetov	(Kazakhstan)	FW	3 June 2007 (aged 19)	Academy	2025		1	1
Youth team
43	Abzal Sagyn	(Kazakhstan)	DF	12 April 2007 (aged 19)	Academy	2025		1	0
53	Andrey Berezutskiy	(Kazakhstan)	FW	30 January 2004 (aged 22)	Academy	2021		1	0
67	Beybarys Abilda	(Kazakhstan)	DF	27 April 2007 (aged 19)	Kairat	2026		1	0
69	Ismail Murtaza	(Kazakhstan)	FW	15 May 2007 (aged 19)	Kairat	2026		1	0
76	Musa Taushev	(Kazakhstan)	DF	24 March 2006 (aged 20)	Academy	2026		1	0
79	Nuradil Serikov	(Kazakhstan)	MF	2 February 2006 (aged 20)	Academy	2026		2	0
84	Alikhan Zheksenbek	(Kazakhstan)	DF	21 May 2008 (aged 18)	Academy	2022		1	0
86	Sanat Satenov	(Kazakhstan)	MF	12 December 2008 (aged 17)	Academy	2026		1	0
96	Batyrkhan Mustafin	(Kazakhstan)	FW	26 March 2005 (aged 21)	Academy	2023		4	1
Players away on loan
19	Nurali Zhaksylykov	(Kazakhstan)	FW	4 November 2004 (aged 21)	Academy	2023		44	4
21	Elkhan Astanov	(Kazakhstan)	MF	21 May 2000 (aged 26)	Ordabasy	2023		75	10
	Arman Kenesov	(Kazakhstan)	MF	4 September 2000 (aged 26)	Aktobe	2025		6	0
Left during the season
22	Asilbek Abdurasulov	(Uzbekistan)	FW	26 September 2007 (aged 19)	on loan from Gazalkent	2026	2026	7	0
78	Rakhimzhan Amangeldinov	(Kazakhstan)	MF	24 November 2005 (aged 20)	Academy	2023		1	0

== Transfers ==
=== In ===
Date	Position	Nationality	Name	From	Fee	Ref.
19 June 2026	MF	(Kazakhstan)	Aleksandr Merkel	Zhenis	Undisclosed	
7 July 2026	DF	(Serbia)	Ivan Miladinović	Unattached	Free	
20 July 2026	FW	(Croatia)	Nikola Burić	Egnatia Rrogozhinë	Undisclosed	

=== Loans in ===
Date from	Position	Nationality	Name	From	Date to	Ref.
3 April 2026	FW	(Uzbekistan)	Asilbek Abdurasulov	Gazalkent	17 June 2026	
7 July 2026	FW	(Kazakhstan)	Damir Marat	Tobol	End of season	

=== Out ===
Date	Position	Nationality	Name	To	Fee	Ref.
30 January 2026	FW	(Nigeria)	Geoffrey Chinedu	Krylia Sovetov	Undisclosed	
19 February 2026	MF	(Albania)	Nazmi Gripshi	Rubin Kazan	Undisclosed	
25 February 2026	FW	(Guinea)	Ousmane Camara	Guangdong GZ-Power	Undisclosed	
5 March 2026	DF	(North Macedonia)	Aleksa Amanović	Ordabasy	Undisclosed	

=== Loans out ===
Date from	Position	Nationality	Name	To	Date to	Ref.
12 July 2025	MF	(Kazakhstan)	Elkhan Astanov	Ordabasy	31 December 2026	
8 February 2026	MF	(Kazakhstan)	Arman Kenesov	Aktobe	End of season	
30 June 2026	FW	(Kazakhstan)	Nurali Zhaksylykov	Kaisar	End of season	

== Friendlies ==
4 February2026	Astana	3–2	Arabian Falcons	United Arab Emirates
18:00 (UTC+5)	Tomasov; Akhmetov; Karimov	Report	Goal

7 February2026	Astana	0–0	Noah	United Arab Emirates
18:00 (UTC+5)		Report

10 February2026	Astana	1–1	Spartak Moscow	United Arab Emirates
18:00 (UTC+5)	Bartolec 71'	Report	Djiku 9'

13 February2026	Astana	2–2	Zhejiang	United Arab Emirates
18:00 (UTC+5)	Gripshi; Karaman	Report	Goal

16 February2026	Astana	2–1	Dinamo Samarqand	United Arab Emirates
18:00 (UTC+5)	Kasym; Karimov	Report	Goal

== Competitions ==
=== Overview ===
Competition	First match	Last match	Starting round	Final position	Record							
Competition	First match	Last match	Starting round	Final position	Pld	W	D	L	GF	GA	GD	Win %
Premier League	8 March 2026	31 October 2026	Matchday 1	3rd	30	15	9	6	48	31	+17	50.00
Kazakhstan Cup	8 April 2026	29 April 2026	Round of 32	Round of 16	2	1	0	1	3	3	+0	50.00
UEFA Conference League	10 July 2026	16 July 2026	First qualifying round	First qualifying round	2	1	0	1	2	4	−2	50.00
Total					34	17	9	8	53	38	+15	50.00

Last updated: 31 October 2026
Source: Competitions

=== Premier League ===
==== Results summary ====
Overall								Home						Away					
Pld	W	D	L	GF	GA	GD	Pts	W	D	L	GF	GA	GD	W	D	L	GF	GA	GD
30	15	9	6	46	29	+17	54	12	3	0	31	8	+23	3	6	6	15	21	−6

Last updated: 31 October 2026.
Source: See Results

==== Results by round ====
Round	1	2	3	4	5	6	7	8	9	10	11	12	13	14	15	16	17	19	20	21	22	24	25	26	27	28	18	23	29	30
Ground	H	A	H	A	H	A	H	A	H	A	H	A	H	A	A	H	H	H	A	H	A	H	H	A	H	A	A	H	H	A
Result	W	D	W	L	D	D	W	L	W	L	W	D	W	L	D	W	W	W	W	W	D	W	W	L	W	L	W	D	D	D
Position	2	2	1	5	6	7	5	6	4	5	4	5	4	6	5	5	3	3	3	3	3	3	3	3	3	3	3	3	3	3
Points	3	4	7	7	8	9	12	12	15	15	18	19	22	22	23	26	29	32	35	38	39	42	45	45	48	48	51	52	53	54

Source: See Results
A = Away; H = Home; W = Win; D = Draw; L = Loss; P = Bye

==== Results ====
8 March 2026 1	Astana	4–1	Zhetysu	Astana
18:0 (UTC+5)	Basmanov 14'; Bartolec 29'; Abrayev 39'; Tomasov 57'; Karimov (yellow card) 74'	Report	Zivanovic 81'	Stadium: Astana Arena; Attendance: 10,001; Referee: Ruslan Sultangaliev

16 March 2026 2	Kaisar	0–0	Astana	Kyzylorda
18:00 (UTC+5)	Konlimkos (yellow card) 78'	Report	Kalaica (yellow card) 23'; Karaman (yellow card) 53'; Abrayev (yellow card) 72'; Basmanov (yellow card) 83'	Stadium: Kaisar Arena; Attendance: 11,000; Referee: Saken Bayymbet

20 March 2026 3	Astana	2–0	Tobol	Astana
19:00 (UTC+5)	Bašić 24' (yellow card) 37'; Karaman (yellow card) 31'; Kasym (penalty missed) 42 66'	Report	Cissé (yellow card) 44'; Tagybergen (yellow card) 80'	Stadium: Astana Arena; Attendance: 9,570; Referee: Sergey Nozhenko

5 April 2026 4	Kairat	4–0	Astana	Almaty
18:00 (UTC+5)	Jorginho 10', 41'; Satpayev 22'; Martynovich 45+1'; Oksanen (yellow card) 77'	Report	Shomko (yellow card) 5'; Karaman (yellow card) 74'	Stadium: Central Stadium; Attendance: 22,800; Referee: Denis Tevyashov

11 April 2026 5	Astana	1–1	Ordabasy	Astana
19:00 (UTC+5)	Bašić (yellow card) 45+2'; Vorogovsky (yellow card) 87' (goal) 90+5'; Kasym (yellow card) 90+1'	Report	Malyi (yellow card) 31'; Amir 77'	Stadium: Astana Arena; Attendance: 13,600; Referee: Daniyar Sakhi

18 April 2026 6	Yelimay	2–2	Astana	Astana
17:00 (UTC+5)	Zhumakhanov 5' (yellow card) 69'; Fessou 27'; Adambaev (yellow card) 51'; Ashirbek (yellow card) 82'	Report	Tomasov 1'; Abrayev 47'; Kasym (yellow card) 83'	Stadium: Astana Arena; Attendance: 12,355; Referee: Alexander Zatula

26 April 2026 7	Astana	2–1	Atyrau	Astana
20:00 (UTC+5)	Kasym 19'; Karimov 24' (yellow card) 85'	Report	Trufanov (yellow card) 72'; Kasym 88' (o.g.)	Stadium: Astana Arena; Attendance: 9,160; Referee: Anton Kuchma

3 May 2026 8	Caspiy	0–1	Astana	Kyzylorda
16:00 (UTC+5)	Nabikhanov (yellow card) 50'; Berdibek (yellow card) 90+4'; Anuarov 90+5' (o.g.); Zhomart (yellow card) 90+9'	Report	Kasym (red card) 18'; Karimov (yellow card) 39'; Bašić (penalty missed) 84'	Stadium: Kaysar Arena; Attendance: 300; Referee: Bulat Sariev

9 May 2026 9	Astana	2–1	Kyzylzhar	Astana
19:00 (UTC+5)	Vorogovsky 54'; Bartolec 58' (yellow card) 77'	Report	Cheredinov (yellow card) 38'; Adil (yellow card) 43'; Pertsukh 47'; Beugre (yellow card) 85' (red card) 89'	Stadium: Astana Arena; Attendance: 4,560; Referee: Danil Gorda

16 May 2026 10	Okzhetpes	1–0	Astana	Kokshetau
17:00 (UTC+5)	Lototskyi 45+3'; Assunpção (yellow card) 63'	Report	Kasym (yellow card) 31'; Bašić (red card) 80'	Stadium: Okzhetpes Stadium; Attendance: 4,000; Referee: Bagdat Abdullaev

22 May 2026 11	Astana	3–0	Ulytau	Astana
17:00 (UTC+5)	Basmanov (yellow card) 21' (goal) 49'; Karimov 23'; Karaman (yellow card) 31'; Kalaica 87'	Report	Nursultanov (yellow card) 90'	Stadium: Astana Arena; Attendance: 7,000; Referee: Daniyar Sakhi

27 May 2026 12	Altai	1–1	Astana	Oskemen
16:00 (UTC+5)	Schmidt (yellow card) 16' (goal) 67'	Report	Bartolec (yellow card) 42'; Karimov 50'	Stadium: Vostok Stadium; Attendance: 3,700; Referee: Saken Bayimbet

14 June 2026 13	Astana	2–0	Irtysh Pavlodar	Astana
19:00 (UTC+5)	Bartolec 36'; Tomasov 44'	Report	Zharynbetov (yellow card) 53'; Agimanov (yellow card) 90+2'	Stadium: Astana Arena; Attendance: 7,750; Referee: Ruslan Sultangaliev

21 June 2026 14	Aktobe	2–0	Astana	Aktobe
20:00 (UTC+5)	Nani (yellow card) 13' (goal) 22'; Atanasov (yellow card) 44'; Pibe 55'; Shushenachev (yellow card) 75'	Report	Beysebekov (yellow card) 20'; Karimov (yellow card) 31'; Bartolec (yellow card) 50'	Stadium: Central Stadium; Attendance: 12,400; Referee: Danil Gorda

28 June 2026 15	Zhenis	2–2	Astana	Astana
19:00 (UTC+5)	Kpozo (yellow card) 43'; Bystrov (yellow card) 59'; Kuat (yellow card) 60'; Gian 68' (pen.); Khaseyn 79'; Plotnikov (yellow card) 84'	Report	Vorogovsky (yellow card) 2'; Tomasov 30' (yellow card) 34'; Kažukolovas (yellow card) 35'; Beysebekov (red card) 38'; Basmanov (yellow card) 67'; Kaltanov 90+4'	Stadium: Astana Arena; Attendance: 8,000; Referee: Alexander Zatula

3 July 2026 16	Astana	1–0	Zhenis	Astana
19:00 (UTC+5)	Abrayev 40'; Tomasov (yellow card) 47'; Karimov (yellow card) 50'	Report	Saulet (yellow card) 56'; Tevzadze (yellow card) 63'	Stadium: Astana Arena; Attendance: 6,345; Referee: Sayat Karabaev

12 July 2026 17	Astana	3–2	Aktobe	Astana
19:00 (UTC+5)	Shomko 12'; Bašić 58'; Basmanov 90+3'	Report	Kairov (yellow card) 11'; Zaria 43'; Shushenachev 55'; Nani (yellow card) 87'	Stadium: Astana Arena; Attendance: 18,653; Referee: Anton Kuchma

26 July 2026 19	Astana	4–1	Altai	Astana
19:00 (UTC+5)	Islamkhan 8'; Tomasov 34'; Karimov 60'; Basmanov 62'; Bartolec (yellow card) 78'; Kasym (yellow card) 90+4'	Report	Dadaev 12'; Kukeev (yellow card) 85'; Nazymkhanov (yellow card) 90+1'	Stadium: Astana Arena; Attendance: 6,372; Referee: Sergey Nozhenko

2 August 2026 20	Ulytau	0–2	Astana	Jezkazgan
17:00 (UTC+5)	Kishi (yellow card) 21'; Harada (yellow card) 40'; Afanasenko (yellow card) 88'	Report	Tomasov 11', 90+1' (yellow card) 38'; Islamkhan (yellow card) 26'	Stadium: Metallurg Stadium; Attendance: 4,500; Referee: Anton Kuchma

9 August 2026 21	Astana	2–1	Okzhetpes	Astana
18:00 (UTC+5)	Bartolec 28'; Tomasov 40'; Abrayev (yellow card) 75'	Report	Lototskyi 20' (yellow card) 81'; Sadovsky (yellow card) 66'; Mukhametkhanov (yellow card) 72'; Marcinho (yellow card) 75'	Stadium: Astana Arena; Attendance: 9,827; Referee: Bulat Sariev

16 August 2026 22	Kyzylzhar	1–1	Astana	Petropavl
19:00 (UTC+5)	Piščević 90+3'	Report	Kalaica (yellow card) 17'; Basmanov 58'; Bartolec (yellow card) 63'; Seysen (yellow card) 73'	Stadium: Karasai Stadium; Attendance: 4,000; Referee: Denis Tevyashov

30 August 2026 24	Atyrau	2–3	Astana	Turkistan
20:00 (UTC+5)	Khvalko (yellow card) 32'; Pantelić 47'; Henrique (yellow card) 82' (goal) 90+5'	Report	Islamkhan 13'; Bašić (yellow card) 38'; Basmanov 42'; Tomasov 66'; Burić (yellow card) 90+7'	Stadium: Turkestan Arena; Attendance: 500; Referee: Sergey Nozhenko

6 September 2026 25	Astana	4–0	Yelimay	Astana
18:00 (UTC+5)	Bašić 40', 45'; Tomasov 49'; Karimov 66' (pen.); Abrayev (yellow card) 90+2'	Report	Tyulyubay (yellow card) 29'; Ashirbek (yellow card) 42'; Ilić (yellow card) 65'; Zhumakhanov (yellow card) 75'	Stadium: Astana Arena; Attendance: 10,723; Referee: Daniyar Sakhi

12 September 2026 26	Ordabasy	1–0	Astana	Shymkent
19:00 (UTC+5)	Amanović (yellow card) 60'; Malyi (yellow card) 64'; Amir 78'	Report	Kasym (yellow card) 10'; Kažukolovas (yellow card) 29'; Bartolec (yellow card) 41'; Merkel (yellow card) 65'	Stadium: Kazhymukan Munaitpasov Stadium; Attendance: 16,882; Referee: Bulat Sariev

17 September 2026 27	Astana	1–0	Kairat	Astana
19:00 (UTC+5)	Karimov 14'; Bašić (yellow card) 86'	Report	Sadybekov (red card) 11'; Jukkola (yellow card) 60'; Gual (yellow card) 86'	Stadium: Astana Arena; Attendance: 28,235; Referee: Denis Tevyashov

10 October 2026 28	Tobol	2–1	Astana	Kostanay
17:00 (UTC+5)	Talal 28'; Lisakovich 61'; Guerra (yellow card) 79'	Report	Marat (yellow card) 45+2'; Bartolec 52'; Karimov (yellow card) 58'; Basmanov (yellow card) 80'; Vorogovsky (yellow card) 90+8'	Stadium: Central Stadium; Attendance: 2,500; Referee: Alexander Zatula

14 October 2026 18	Irtysh Pavlodar	0–1	Astana	Pavlodar
16:00 (UTC+5)	Poé (yellow card) 1'; Shimamura (yellow card) 39'	Report	Islamkhan 50' (pen.)	Stadium: Central Stadium; Attendance: 850; Referee: Anton Kuchma
Note: Match originally scheduled for 19 July.

18 October 2026 23	Astana	2–2	Caspiy	Astana
19:00 (UTC+5)	Tomasov 26'; Beysebekov (yellow card) 35'; Aripov 68' (o.g.)	Report	Epton 23'; Sylla 35'; Aripov (yellow card) 49'; Amaral (yellow card) 71'	Stadium: Astana Arena; Attendance: 6,934; Referee: Danil Gorda
Note: Match originally scheduled for 23 August.

25 October 2026 29	Astana	0–0	Kaisar	Astana
19:00 (UTC+5)	Tomasov (yellow card) 46'; Kasym (yellow card) 53'; Basmanov (yellow card) 71'; Bartolec (yellow card) 84'; Beysebekov (yellow card) 87'	Report	Macedo (yellow card) 18'	Stadium: Astana Arena; Attendance: 9,300; Referee: Denis Tevyashov

31 October 2026 30	Zhetysu	2–2	Astana	Taldykorgan
15:00 (UTC+5)	Luna (yellow card) 47'; Dobay 58'; Kashken (red card) 70'; Anuarbekov 83' (yellow card) 83'; Muzhikov (yellow card) 83'	Report	Basmanov 54'; Burić 78'; Karaman (yellow card) 88'; Anuarov 90+7'	Stadium: Jetisu Stadium; Attendance: 2,300; Referee: Bagdat Abdullaev

==== League table ====
Pos	Team	Pld	W	D	L	GF	GA	GD	Pts	Qualification or relegation
1	Ordabasy (C, Q)	30	21	5	4	59	23	+36	68	Qualification for the Champions League first qualifying round
2	Kairat (T)	30	19	8	3	60	23	+37	65	Qualification for the Conference League first qualifying round
3	Astana (Q)	30	15	9	6	48	31	+17	54	Qualification for the Conference League first qualifying round
4	Okzhetpes	30	16	6	8	49	38	+11	54	
5	Aktobe	30	14	7	9	47	39	+8	49	

Source: UEFA, Soccerway
Rules for classification: 1) Points; 2) Goal difference; 3) Matches won; 4) Goals scored; 5) Away goals scored; 6) Head-to-head points; 7) Head-to-head matches won; 8) Head-to-head goal difference; 9) Head-to-head goals scored; 10) Head-to-head away goals scored; 11) Draw..
(C) Champions; (Q) Qualified for the phase indicated; (T) Qualified, but not yet for the particular phase indicated

=== Kazakhstan Cup ===
8 April 2026 Round of 32	BKS Almaty	1–2	Astana	Almaty
15:00 (UTC+5)	Parkhatzhan 30'	Report	Mustafin 34'; Taushev (red card) 37'; Akhmetov 90+2'	Stadium: Khan Tengri Stadium; Attendance: 1,500; Referee: Amankeldin Bekarys

29 April 2026 Round of 16	Astana	1–2	Tobol	Astana
18:00 (UTC+5)	Abdurasulov (yellow card) 36'; Karaman (yellow card) 53'; Anuarov 80'	Report	Bakitzhanov (yellow card) 6'; Talal 7'; Usenov (yellow card) 42' (yellow-red card) 45+2'; Zhumashev 87' (pen.)	Stadium: Astana Arena; Attendance: 4,000; Referee: Denis Tevyashov

=== UEFA Conference League ===
==== Qualifying rounds ====
10 July 2026 First qualifying round 1st leg	Dinamo City (Albania)	0–1	(Kazakhstan) Astana	Elbasan, Albania
00:00 (UTC+5)		Report	Karimov 69'	Stadium: Elbasan Arena; Attendance: 400; Referee: Lukáš Dzivjak (Slovakia)
Note: Dinamo City played their home match at the Elbasan Arena in Elbasan instead of their own stadium, Selman Stërmasi Stadium in Tirana, which does not fulfill UEFA requirements.

16 July 2026 First qualifying round 2nd leg	Astana (Kazakhstan)	1–4 (a.e.t.) (2–4 agg.)	(Albania) Dinamo City	Astana, Kazakhstan
20:00 (UTC+5)	Islamkhan 23' (pen.); Kažukolovas (yellow card) 32' (yellow-red card) 49'; Bartolec (yellow card) 64'; Karimov (yellow card) 67'; Kalaica (yellow card) 111'	Report	Ismaili (yellow card) 22'; Vila (yellow card) 22'; Dita 50' (pen.); Berisha 62'; Përndreca (yellow card) 82'; Koma (yellow card) 86' (goal) 120+4'; Vila 93'; Manellari (yellow card) 105'; Farruku (yellow card) 107'	Stadium: Astana Arena; Attendance: 15,270; Referee: Oscar Johnson (Sweden)

== Squad statistics ==
As of match played 31 October 2026

=== Appearances and goals ===
No.	Pos	Nat	Player	Total		Premier League		Kazakhstan Cup		Conference League	
No.	Pos	Nat	Player	Apps	Goals	Apps	Goals	Apps	Goals	Apps	Goals
2	DF	(Croatia) CRO	Karlo Bartolec	31	5	27+1	5	0+1	0	2	0
3	DF	(Croatia) CRO	Branimir Kalaica	25	1	22	1	0+1	0	2	0
4	DF	(Kazakhstan) KAZ	Sanzhar Anuarov	11	1	4+6	0	1	1	0	0
5	DF	(Lithuania) LTU	Kipras Kažukolovas	20	0	15+3	0	0	0	2	0
6	DF	(Kazakhstan) KAZ	Alibek Kasym	22	2	20+2	2	0	0	0	0
7	MF	(Kazakhstan) KAZ	Dinmukhamed Karaman	32	0	24+5	0	1	0	2	0
8	MF	(Bosnia and Herzegovina) BIH	Ivan Bašić	24	4	22	4	0	0	1+1	0
9	MF	(Kazakhstan) KAZ	Bauyrzhan Islamkhan	32	4	23+6	3	0+1	0	2	1
10	MF	(Croatia) CRO	Marin Tomasov	29	11	27	11	0	0	2	0
11	DF	(Kazakhstan) KAZ	Yan Vorogovsky	32	2	29+1	2	0	0	2	0
15	DF	(Kazakhstan) KAZ	Abzal Beysebekov	28	0	12+14	0	0	0	1+1	0
17	FW	(Kazakhstan) KAZ	Damir Marat	7	0	4+3	0	0	0	0	0
20	FW	(Nigeria) NGR	Nnamdi Ahanonu	8	0	1+5	0	1	0	0+1	0
21	MF	(Kazakhstan) KAZ	Aleksandr Merkel	14	0	2+10	0	0	0	0+2	0
29	FW	(Croatia) CRO	Nikola Burić	12	1	1+11	1	0	0	0	0
43	DF	(Kazakhstan) KAZ	Abzal Sagyn	1	0	0	0	0+1	0	0	0
45	DF	(Serbia) SRB	Ivan Miladinović	7	0	1+5	0	0	0	0+1	0
47	MF	(Kazakhstan) KAZ	Maksat Abrayev	29	3	17+9	3	0+1	0	2	0
52	DF	(Kazakhstan) KAZ	Timur Tokenov	2	0	0	0	2	0	0	0
57	MF	(Kazakhstan) KAZ	Akhmetali Kaltanov	5	1	1+3	1	1	0	0	0
67	DF	(Kazakhstan) KAZ	Beybarys Abilda	1	0	0	0	0+1	0	0	0
69	FW	(Kazakhstan) KAZ	Ismail Murtaza	1	0	0	0	0+1	0	0	0
70	DF	(Kazakhstan) KAZ	Nursat Nurmukhambet	2	0	0	0	2	0	0	0
71	FW	(Kazakhstan) KAZ	Anuar Tolendi	1	0	0+1	0	0	0	0	0
72	FW	(Kazakhstan) KAZ	Stanislav Basmanov	28	7	21+5	7	0	0	0+2	0
74	GK	(Kazakhstan) KAZ	Mukhammedzhan Seysen	18	0	17	0	1	0	0	0
76	DF	(Kazakhstan) KAZ	Musa Taushev	1	0	0	0	1	0	0	0
77	DF	(Kazakhstan) KAZ	Dmitry Shomko	15	1	3+9	1	1	0	0+2	0
78	MF	(Kazakhstan) KAZ	Rakhimzhan Amangeldinov	1	0	0	0	1	0	0	0
79	MF	(Kazakhstan) KAZ	Nuradil Serikov	2	0	0	0	2	0	0	0
81	FW	(Kazakhstan) KAZ	Ramazan Karimov	32	7	22+7	6	0+1	0	2	1
82	MF	(Kazakhstan) KAZ	Ruslan Valikhan	2	0	0+1	0	1	0	0	0
84	DF	(Kazakhstan) KAZ	Alikhan Zheksenbek	1	0	0	0	1	0	0	0
86	MF	(Kazakhstan) KAZ	Sanat Satenov	1	0	0	0	0+1	0	0	0
89	FW	(Kazakhstan) KAZ	Arsen Akhmetov	1	1	0	0	0+1	1	0	0
91	DF	(Kazakhstan) KAZ	Aytuar Token	3	0	1+1	0	1	0	0	0
93	GK	(Croatia) CRO	Josip Čondrić	15	0	13	0	0	0	2	0
96	FW	(Kazakhstan) KAZ	Batyrkhan Mustafin	1	1	0	0	1	1	0	0
99	GK	(Kazakhstan) KAZ	Danila Karpikov	1	0	0	0	1	0	0	0
Players away from Astana on loan:
19	FW	(Kazakhstan) KAZ	Nurali Zhaksylykov	10	0	1+7	0	2	0	0	0
Players who left Astana during the season:
22	FW	(Uzbekistan) UZB	Asilbek Abdurasulov	7	0	0+6	0	1	0	0	0

=== Goal scorers ===
Place	Position	Nation	Number	Name	Premier League	Kazakhstan Cup	UEFA Conference League	Total
1	MF	(Croatia)	10	Marin Tomasov	11	0	0	11
2	FW	(Kazakhstan)	72	Stanislav Basmanov	7	0	0	7
2	FW	(Kazakhstan)	81	Ramazan Karimov	6	0	1	7
4	DF	(Croatia)	2	Karlo Bartolec	5	0	0	5
5	MF	(Bosnia and Herzegovina)	8	Ivan Bašić	4	0	0	4
5	MF	(Kazakhstan)	9	Bauyrzhan Islamkhan	3	0	1	4
7	MF	(Kazakhstan)	47	Maksat Abrayev	3	0	0	3
8	DF	(Kazakhstan)	6	Alibek Kasym	2	0	0	2
8	DF	(Kazakhstan)	11	Yan Vorogovsky	2	0	0	2
10	DF	(Croatia)	3	Branimir Kalaica	1	0	0	1
10	MF	(Kazakhstan)	57	Akhmetali Kaltanov	1	0	0	1
10	DF	(Kazakhstan)	77	Dmitry Shomko	1	0	0	1
10	FW	(Croatia)	29	Nikola Burić	1	0	0	1
10	FW	(Kazakhstan)	96	Batyrkhan Mustafin	0	1	0	1
10	FW	(Kazakhstan)	89	Arsen Akhmetov	0	1	0	1
10	DF	(Kazakhstan)	4	Sanzhar Anuarov	0	1	0	1
10				Own goal	1	0	0	1
				TOTALS	48	3	2	53

=== Clean sheets ===
Place	Position	Nation	Number	Name	Premier League	Kazakhstan Cup	UEFA Conference League	Total
1	GK	(Kazakhstan)	74	Mukhammedzhan Seysen	6	0	0	6
2	GK	(Croatia)	93	Josip Čondrić	4	0	1	5
				TOTALS	10	0	1	11

=== Disciplinary record ===
Number	Nation	Position	Name	Premier League		Kazakhstan Cup		UEFA Conference League		Total	
Number	Nation	Position	Name	Yellow card	Red card	Yellow card	Red card	Yellow card	Red card	Yellow card	Red card
2	(Croatia)	DF	Karlo Bartolec	7	0	0	0	1	0	8	0
3	(Croatia)	DF	Branimir Kalaica	2	0	0	0	1	0	3	0
4	(Kazakhstan)	DF	Sanzhar Anuarov	1	0	0	0	0	0	1	0
5	(Lithuania)	DF	Kipras Kažukolovas	2	0	0	0	2	1	4	1
6	(Kazakhstan)	DF	Alibek Kasym	6	1	0	0	0	0	6	1
7	(Kazakhstan)	MF	Dinmukhamed Karaman	5	0	1	0	0	0	6	0
8	(Bosnia and Herzegovina)	MF	Ivan Bašić	4	1	0	0	0	0	4	1
9	(Kazakhstan)	MF	Bauyrzhan Islamkhan	1	0	0	0	0	0	1	0
10	(Croatia)	MF	Marin Tomasov	4	0	0	0	0	0	4	0
11	(Kazakhstan)	DF	Yan Vorogovsky	3	0	0	0	0	0	3	0
15	(Kazakhstan)	DF	Abzal Beysebekov	3	1	0	0	0	0	3	1
17	(Kazakhstan)	FW	Damir Marat	1	0	0	0	0	0	1	0
21	(Kazakhstan)	MF	Aleksandr Merkel	1	0	0	0	0	0	1	0
29	(Croatia)	FW	Nikola Burić	1	0	0	0	0	0	1	0
47	(Kazakhstan)	MF	Maksat Abrayev	4	0	0	0	0	0	4	0
72	(Kazakhstan)	FW	Stanislav Basmanov	5	0	0	0	0	0	5	0
76	(Kazakhstan)	DF	Musa Taushev	0	0	0	1	0	0	0	1
77	(Kazakhstan)	DF	Dmitry Shomko	1	0	0	0	0	0	1	0
81	(Kazakhstan)	FW	Ramazan Karimov	6	0	0	0	1	0	7	0
Players away on loan:
Players who left Astana during the season:
22	(Uzbekistan)	FW	Asilbek Abdurasulov	0	0	0	1	0	0	0	1
			TOTALS	57	3	2	1	5	1	64	5
