= 2025 FC Astana season =

FC Astana
2025 season
- Chairman: Sayan Khamitzhanov
- Manager: Grigori Babayan
- Stadium: Astana Arena
- Premier League: 2nd
- Kazakhstan Cup: Quarter-final vs Zhenis
- Conference League: Third qualifying round vs Lausanne-Sport
- Top goalscorer: League: Nazmi Gripshi (16); All: Nazmi Gripshi (16)
- Highest home attendance: 28,211 vs Aktobe (19 October 2025)
- Lowest home attendance: 8,922 vs Zhetysu (30 March 2025)
- Average home league attendance: 10,613 (19 October 2025)

The 2025 FC Astana season was the seventeenth successive season that FC Astana will play in the Kazakhstan Premier League, the highest tier of association football in Kazakhstan. The finished the season as runners-up to Kairat having drawn 1-1 in the last game of the season. In the Kazakhstan Cup they reached the Quarterfinals before being knocked out by Zhenis and in the Conference League they were knocked out in the Third qualifying round by Lausanne-Sport.

== Season events ==
On 19 January, Astana announced that Barnes Osei would be leaving the club after his contract had expired, and they had not exercised their option to extended it for an additional year.

On 2 July, Astana announced the signing of Ivan Bašić after he had left Orenburg.

On 9 July, Astana announced that Nnamdi Ahanonu had joined Kyzylzhar on loan for the remainder of the season.

On 11 July, Astana announced the signing of Driton Camaj after he had left Kecskeméti.

On 26 July, Astana announced the signing of Bauyrzhan Islamkhan from Turan.

== Squad ==
As of match played 26 October 2025

No.	Name	Nationality	Position	Date of birth (age)	Signed from	Signed in	Contract ends	Apps.	Goals
Goalkeepers
74	Mukhammedzhan Seysen	(Kazakhstan)	GK	14 February 1999 (aged 26)	Unattached	2024		26	0
93	Josip Čondrić	(Croatia)	GK	27 August 1993 (aged 32)	Zrinjski Mostar	2023		76	0
Defenders
2	Karlo Bartolec	(Croatia)	DF	20 April 1995 (aged 30)	Lokomotiva Zagreb	2024	2025	55	3
3	Branimir Kalaica	(Croatia)	DF	1 June 1998 (aged 27)	Lokomotiva Zagreb	2024	2026	52	4
4	Marat Bystrov	(Kazakhstan)	DF	19 June 1992 (aged 33)	Unattached	2024		30	0
5	Kipras Kažukolovas	(Lithuania)	DF	20 November 2000 (aged 24)	Žalgiris	2024		58	3
6	Yan Vorogovsky	(Kazakhstan)	DF	7 August 1996 (aged 29)	RWD Molenbeek	2023	2026	75	2
15	Abzal Beysebekov	(Kazakhstan)	DF	30 November 1992 (aged 32)	Vostok	2012		444	20
18	Dmitry Shomko	(Kazakhstan)	DF	19 March 1990 (aged 35)	Elimai	2025		291	12
22	Aleksandr Marochkin	(Kazakhstan)	DF	14 July 1990 (aged 35)	Tobol	2023		71	3
45	Aleksa Amanović	(North Macedonia)	DF	24 October 1996 (aged 29)	Tobol	2023		105	4
Midfielders
7	Max Ebong	(Belarus)	MF	26 August 1999 (aged 26)	Shakhtyor Soligorsk	2020		178	11
8	Ivan Bašić	(Bosnia and Herzegovina)	MF	30 April 2002 (aged 23)	Unattached	2025		15	2
10	Marin Tomasov	(Croatia)	MF	31 August 1987 (aged 38)	Rijeka	2018		299	122
19	Bauyrzhan Islamkhan	(Kazakhstan)	MF	23 February 1993 (aged 32)	Turan	2025		8	1
77	Nazmi Gripshi	(Albania)	MF	5 July 1997 (aged 28)	Ballkani	2024	2026	53	25
Forwards
9	Geoffrey Chinedu	(Nigeria)	FW	1 October 1997 (aged 28)	Liaoning Tieren	2024	2026	54	27
11	Driton Camaj	(Montenegro)	FW	7 March 1997 (aged 28)	Unattached	2025		10	1
14	Nurali Zhaksylykov	(Kazakhstan)	FW	4 November 2004 (aged 20)	Academy	2023		34	4
28	Ousmane Camara	(Guinea)	FW	28 December 1998 (aged 26)	Dinamo Tbilisi	2024	2026	71	16
72	Stanislav Basmanov	(Kazakhstan)	FW	24 June 2001 (aged 24)	Academy	2020		100	8
81	Ramazan Karimov	(Kazakhstan)	FW	5 July 1999 (aged 26)	Maktaaral	2024		75	8
Youth team
52	Timur Tokenov	(Kazakhstan)	DF	24 April 2004 (aged 21)	Academy	2023		0	0
53	Andrey Berezutskiy	(Kazakhstan)	FW	30 January 2004 (aged 21)	Academy	2021		1	0
57	Akhmetali Kaltanov	(Kazakhstan)	MF	19 April 2006 (aged 19)	Academy	2023		0	0
71	Sanzhar Anuarov	(Kazakhstan)	DF	16 February 2005 (aged 20)	Academy	2023		1	0
78	Rakhimzhan Amangeldinov	(Kazakhstan)	MF	24 November 2005 (aged 19)	Academy	2023		0	0
96	Batyrkhan Mustafin	(Kazakhstan)	FW	26 March 2005 (aged 20)	Academy	2023		3	0
Players away on loan
8	Arman Kenesov	(Kazakhstan)	MF	4 September 2000 (aged 25)	Aktobe	2025		6	0
11	Nnamdi Ahanonu	(Nigeria)	FW	22 February 2002 (aged 23)	Skënderbeu Korçë	2024	2026	27	3
21	Elkhan Astanov	(Kazakhstan)	MF	21 May 2000 (aged 25)	Ordabasy	2023		75	10
Left during the season
20	Vladislav Prokopenko	(Kazakhstan)	FW	1 July 2000 (aged 25)	Academy	2016		61	6
47	Maksim Mamontov	(Kazakhstan)	DF	23 April 2004 (aged 21)	Academy	2022		0	0
91	Tamirlan Abuov	(Kazakhstan)	GK	13 September 2004 (aged 21)	Academy	2023		0	0

== Transfers ==
=== In ===
Date	Position	Nationality	Name	From	Fee	Ref.
1 January 2025	MF	(Kazakhstan)	Arman Kenesov	Aktobe	Undisclosed	
27 February 2025	DF	(Kazakhstan)	Dmitry Shomko	Elimai	Undisclosed	
2 July 2025	MF	(Bosnia and Herzegovina)	Ivan Bašić	Unattached	Free	
11 July 2025	FW	(Montenegro)	Driton Camaj	Unattached	Free	
26 July 2025	MF	(Kazakhstan)	Bauyrzhan Islamkhan	Turan	Undisclosed	

=== Out ===
Date	Position	Nationality	Name	To	Fee	Ref.
27 February 2025	FW	(Kazakhstan)	Vladislav Prokopenko	Okzhetpes	Undisclosed	

=== Loans out ===
Date from	Position	Nationality	Name	To	Date to	Ref.
26 June 2025	MF	(Kazakhstan)	Arman Kenesov	Irtysh Pavlodar	31 December 2025	
9 July 2025	FW	(Nigeria)	Nnamdi Ahanonu	Kyzylzhar	31 December 2025	
12 July 2025	MF	(Kazakhstan)	Elkhan Astanov	Ordabasy	31 December 2025	

=== Released ===
Date	Position	Nationality	Name	Joined	Date	Ref.
7 January 2025	GK	(Kazakhstan)	Aleksandr Zarutskiy	Kairat	10 January 2025	
19 January 2025	MF	(Ghana)	Barnes Osei	Bnei Sakhnin		
1 April 2025	GK	(Kazakhstan)	Tamirlan Abuov			
1 July 2025	DF	(Kazakhstan)	Maksim Mamontov			
31 December 2025	DF	(Kazakhstan)	Marat Bystrov	Zhenis	6 January 2026	
31 December 2025	DF	(Kazakhstan)	Aleksandr Marochkin	Tobol	1 January 2026	
31 December 2025	DF	(Kazakhstan)	Dmitry Shomko	Re-Signed		
31 December 2025	MF	(Belarus)	Max Ebong	CSKA Sofia	1 January 2026	
31 December 2025	FW	(Montenegro)	Driton Camaj	Novi Pazar	9 January 2026	

== Friendlies ==
2 February 2025	Spartak Moscow	4–1	Astana	Dubai, United Arab Emirates
17:30 (UTC+5)	Khlusevich 21'; Chernov 31'; Medina 53'; Zorin 57'	Report	Amanović 10'	Stadium: Jebel Ali Centre of Excellence

10 February 2025	Gulf United	1–4	Astana	United Arab Emirates
(UTC+5)	Goal	Report	Zhaksylykov 43'; Gripshi (pen.); Ahanonu 89'; Astanov 90+3'

13 February 2025	Astana	3–0	Zhejiang Professional	Dubai, United Arab Emirates
17:00 (UTC+5)	Chinedu (pen.); Gripshi	Report		Stadium: JA Sports Center

17 February 2025	Astana	6–1	Arabian Falcons	United Arab Emirates
11:30 (UTC+5)	Basmanov; Karimov; Zhaksylykov; Camara	Report	Goal

17 February 2025	Krasnodar	1–0	Astana	Dubai, United Arab Emirates
17:30 (UTC+5)	Spertsyan 29' (pen.); Batxi (yellow card) 39'; Córdoba (yellow card) 55'	Report	Gripshi (penalty missed) 84'	Stadium: Jebel Ali Centre of Excellence

20 February 2025	Astana	2–2	Dinamo Samarqand	United Arab Emirates
16:30 (UTC+5)	Chinedu 19'; Karimov 99'	Report	Kucherenko 79'; 110'
Note: Match played was 120minutes.

== Competitions ==
=== Overview ===
Competition	First match	Last match	Starting round	Final position	Record							
Competition	First match	Last match	Starting round	Final position	Pld	W	D	L	GF	GA	GD	Win %
Premier League	2 March 2025	26 October 2025	Matchday 1	2nd	26	17	6	3	66	30	+36	65.38
Kazakhstan Cup	13 April 2025	14 May 2025	Round of 16	Quarter-final	2	0	2	0	2	2	+0	0.00
UEFA Conference League	24 July 2025	14 August 2025	Second qualifying round	Third qualifying round	4	1	1	2	4	6	−2	25.00
Total					32	18	9	5	72	38	+34	56.25

Last updated: 26 October 2025
Source: Competitions

=== Premier League ===
==== Results summary ====
Overall								Home						Away					
Pld	W	D	L	GF	GA	GD	Pts	W	D	L	GF	GA	GD	W	D	L	GF	GA	GD
25	16	6	3	61	27	+34	54	8	3	1	40	17	+23	8	3	2	21	10	+11

Last updated: 26 October 2025.
Source: See Results

==== Results by round ====
Round	1	2	3	4	5	6	18	7	8	9	10	11	12	13	14	15	16	17	21	22	19	23	20	24	25	26
Ground	H	A	H	H	A	H	A	A	H	A	H	A	H	A	H	A	A	H	H	A	H	H	A	A	H	A
Result	D	W	W	W	D	W	W	D	L	W	W	W	W	W	D	W	L	W	W	L	W	D	W	W	W	D
Position	4	3	3	3	2	2	2	2	3	3	2	1	1	1	1	1	1	1	1	2	1	1	1	1	2	2

Source: See Results
A = Away; H = Home; W = Win; D = Draw; L = Loss; P = Bye

==== Results ====
2 March 2025 1	Astana	1–1	Kairat	Astana
18:00 (UTC+5)	Tomasov 41'; Vorogovsky (yellow card) 81'	Report	Kasabulat (yellow card) 42'; Glazer (yellow card) 59'; Satpaev 67'	Stadium: Astana Arena; Attendance: 26,153; Referee: Bulat Sariev

9 March 2025 2	Kyzylzhar	0–2	Astana	Petropavl
19:00 (UTC+5)	Miroshnichenko (yellow card) 34'; Eleukin (yellow card) 65'	Report	Chinedu 11'; Bartolec (yellow card) 17'; Amanović (yellow card) 33'; Gripshi 42'; Zhaksylykov (yellow card) 69'	Stadium: Karasai Stadium; Attendance: 400; Referee: Sanjar Iskakov

30 March 2025 3	Astana	3–0	Zhetysu	Astana
16:00 (UTC+5)	Tomasov 14', 45+1', 63'; Chinedu (yellow card) 28'; Beysebekov (yellow card) 71'	Report	Takulov (yellow card) 26'; Rudoselsky (yellow card) 29'; Akhmedov (yellow card) 66'; Aymanov (yellow card) 83'	Stadium: Astana Arena; Attendance: 8,922; Referee: Denis Tevyashov

5 April 2025 4	Astana	2–1	Ordabasy	Astana
19:00 (UTC+5)	Camara 33', 58'; Amanović (yellow card) 39'; Ebong (yellow card) 90+2'	Report	Astanov 40'; Khalmatov (yellow card) 73'; Antić (yellow card) 90+3'	Stadium: Astana Arena; Attendance: 10,052; Referee: Saken Baimbet

20 April 2025 5	Turan	1–1	Astana	Turkistan
17:00 (UTC+5)	Mukhtorov 84'	Report	Tomasov 30'; Beysebekov (yellow card) 74'	Stadium: Turkistan Arena; Attendance: Denis Tevyashov; Referee: 3,500

26 April 2025 6	Astana	2–1	Atyrau	Astana
19:00 (UTC+5)	Chinedu 2', 45+1'; Basmanov (yellow card) 63'	Report	Chirkov (yellow card) 60'; Sapanov 66'; Kybyray (yellow card) 75'	Stadium: Astana Arena; Attendance: 5,895; Referee: Sanjar Iskakov

30 April 2025 18	Atyrau	0–2	Astana	Atyrau
18:00 (UTC+5)	Tokhtarov (yellow card) 32'; Kaplenko (yellow card) 62'	Report	Gripshi 36' (pen.); Tomasov 71'; Basmanov (yellow card) 77'; Astanov (yellow card) 88'	Stadium: Munaishy Stadium; Attendance: 3,000; Referee: Danil Gorda

4 May 2025 7	Kaisar	1–1	Astana	Kyzylorda
17:00 (UTC+5)	Agzambaev (yellow card) 45+3'; A.Zhaksylykov 59' (pen.); Salaidin (yellow card) 88'	Report	Chinedu (penalty missed) 41'; Bartolec (yellow card) 68'; Tomasov (yellow card) 84'; Gripshi 90' (pen.); Amanović (yellow card) 90+9'	Stadium: Gani Muratbayev Stadium; Attendance: 3,800; Referee: Sergey Nozhenko

10 May 2025 8	Astana	1–3	Tobol	Astana
19:00 (UTC+5)	Ebong (yellow card) 67'; Chinedu 86'	Report	El Messaoudi 8'; Signevich 16', 37'; Ndiaye (yellow card) 34'; Braga (yellow card) 48'	Stadium: Astana Arena; Attendance: 7,200; Referee: Daniyar Sakhi

18 May 2025 9	Ulytau	0–2	Astana	Jezkazgan
16:00 (UTC+5)	Aslan (yellow card) 53'	Report	Amanović (yellow card) 48'; Gripshi 72'; Karimov (yellow card) 89'; Basmanov 90+4'	Stadium: Metallurg Stadium; Attendance: 4,550; Referee: Sayat Sulikanov

24 May 2025 10	Astana	4–2	Zhenis	Astana
19:30 (UTC+5)	Kalaica 14'; Beysebekov 76'; Karimov 88'; Astanov 90' (yellow card) 90+1'	Report	Tevzadze 4'; Adílio 31'; Ignatovich (yellow card) 62'; Kuat (yellow card) 69'	Stadium: Astana Arena; Attendance: 8,465; Referee: Timur Kumashev

30 May 2025 11	Elimai	0–2	Astana	Semey
18:00 (UTC+5)	Payruz (yellow card) 16'	Report	Karimov 32'; Camara 54'; Ebong (yellow card) 90'	Stadium: Spartak Stadium; Attendance: 8,500; Referee: Ruslan Sultangaliev

15 June 2025 12	Astana	5–2	Okzhetpes	Astana
18:00 (UTC+5)	Camara 29'; Amanović (yellow card) 30'; Gripshi 33'; Tomasov 37' (pen.); Ebong 57'; Basmanov 86'	Report	Jovanović 7'; Cuckić 26'; Zhumabekov (yellow card) 32'; Shamshi (yellow card) 88'	Stadium: Astana Arena; Attendance: Daniyar Sakhi; Referee: 5,953

22 June 2025 13	Aktobe	0–1	Astana	Aktobe
20:00 (UTC+5)	Skvortsov (yellow card) 28'	Report	Kalaica (yellow card) 74'; Gripshi 84' (pen.)	Stadium: Central Stadium; Attendance: 12,400; Referee: Bagdat Abdullaev

29 June 2025 14	Astana	3–3	Kyzylzhar	Astana
20:00 (UTC+5)	Noyok 6' (o.g.); Amanović (yellow card) 40'; Gripshi 51' (pen.); Camara 53'	Report	Gorshunov 28' (yellow card) 46'; Kozlenko (yellow card) 35'; Sabino 74'; Sebai 79' (yellow card) 89'; Gbamblé (yellow card) 82'	Stadium: Astana Arena; Attendance: 6,630; Referee: Aleksandr Zatula

6 July 2025 15	Zhetysu	0–2	Astana	Taldykorgan
19:00 (UTC+5)	Karimov (yellow card) 9'; Esimbekov (yellow card) 54'	Report	Chinedu (yellow card) 16' (goal) 68'; Gripshi 45+1'	Stadium: Jetisu Stadium; Attendance: 2,000; Referee: Danil Gorda

13 July 2025 16	Ordabasy	1–0	Astana	Shymkent
20:00 (UTC+5)	Zhaksybaev (yellow card) 34'; Sultaniyazov (yellow card) 47' (yellow-red card) 67'; Everton 85'; Căpățînă (yellow card) 90'	Report		Stadium: Kazhymukan Munaitpasov Stadium; Attendance: 8,000; Referee: Bulat Sariev

18 July 2025 17	Astana	7–0	Turan	Astana
20:00 (UTC+5)	Zhaksylykov 9', 42'; Camara 16'; Gripshi 19'; Kalaica (yellow card) 61'; Tomasov (yellow card) 65' (goal) 86'; Chinedu 81'; Karimov 90+2' (pen.)	Report	Duysenbekuly (yellow card) 23'; Abbas (yellow card) 45'	Stadium: Astana Arena; Attendance: 5,000; Referee: Daniyar Sakhi

17 August 2025 21	Astana	4–0	Ulytau	Astana
20:00 (UTC+5)	Camara 51'; Ebong 53'; Chinedu 68'; Tomasov (yellow card) 75'; Beysebekov (yellow card) 84'; Amanović (yellow card) 90+1'; Camaj 90+3'	Report		Stadium: Astana Arena; Attendance: 3,450; Referee: Aleksandr Zatula

23 August 2025 22	Zhenis	3–2	Astana	Astana
19:00 (UTC+5)	Kuat (yellow card) 3'; Rom (yellow card) 36'; Lobjanidze 60', 73'; Sovet (yellow card) 68'; Gian (yellow card) 77'; Saulet (yellow card) 86'; Sadovsky 90+4'	Report	Zhaksylykov 14' (yellow card) 64'; Gripshi 81' (pen.); Kalaica (yellow card) 85'	Stadium: Astana Arena; Attendance: 7,000; Referee: Sanjar Iskakov

28 August 2025 19	Astana	5–1	Kaisar	Astana
20:00 (UTC+5)	Marochkin 19'; Ebong 21'; Camara 54'; Gripshi 57'; Tomasov 61' (pen.); Karimov (yellow card) 90+2'	Report	Agzambaev 38'; Murzagaliev (yellow card) 72'	Stadium: Astana Arena; Attendance: 6,800; Referee: Denis Tevyashov
Note: Match originally scheduled for 3 August, but postponed on 1 August.

14 September 2025 23	Astana	3–3	Yelimay	Astana
19:00 (UTC+5)	Gripshi 14', 61'; Amanović (yellow card) 24' (goal) 27'; Camara (yellow card) 34'; Vorogovsky (yellow card) 87' (red card) 90+1'	Report	Maicom (yellow card) 2'; Rolón 33'; Kenzhebek 57'; Sviridov 64'	Stadium: Astana Arena; Attendance: 15,233; Referee: João Gonçalves

19 September 2025 20	Tobol	2–3	Astana	Kostanay
19:00 (UTC+5)	Chesnokov 2'; El Messaoudi 34' (pen.); Tagybergen (red card) 37'; Zuyev (yellow card) 90+7'	Report	Tomasov 6', 90+1'; Marochkin (yellow card) 11'; Chinedu 45+2'	Stadium: Central Stadium; Attendance: 7,000; Referee: Bulat Sariev

28 September 2025 24	Okzhetpes	1–2	Astana	Kokshetau
15:00 (UTC+5)	Mukhammed (yellow card) 80'; Satanov (yellow card) 83'; Čondrić 90+3' (o.g.)	Report	Gripshi 5' (pen.), 81' (pen.); Kalaica (yellow card) 82'	Stadium: Okzhetpes Stadium; Attendance: 2,500; Referee: Bagdat Abdullaev

19 October 2025 25	Astana	5–3	Aktobe	Astana
18:00 (UTC+5)	Chinedu 10', 34', 50'; Shomko (yellow card) 16'; Bartolec (yellow card) 20'; Camara 21'; Gripshi 45+2' (pen.); Bystrov (yellow card) 76'; Camaj (yellow card) 87'; Čondrić (yellow card) 90'	Report	Jean 13'; Sosah 40' (yellow card) 77'; Kairov (yellow card) 45+1'; Kasym (yellow card) 49'; Shushenachev 62'; Baydavletov (yellow card) 73'	Stadium: Astana Arena; Attendance: 28,211; Referee: Bulat Sariev

26 October 2025 26	Kairat	1–1	Astana	Almaty
15:00 (UTC+5)	Satpayev 56'	Report	Tomasov 15'; Shomko (yellow card) 37'	Stadium: Central Stadium; Attendance: 22,800; Referee: Matteo Marchetti

==== League table ====
Pos	Team	Pld	W	D	L	GF	GA	GD	Pts	Qualification or relegation
1	Kairat (C)	26	18	5	3	53	19	+34	59	Qualification for the Champions League first qualifying round
2	Astana	26	17	6	3	66	30	+36	57	Qualification for the Conference League first qualifying round
3	Tobol	26	16	6	4	45	25	+20	54	Qualification for the Conference League second qualifying round (Note: Since the winners of the 2025 Kazakhstan Cup, Tobol, finished in the top three of the Premier League, the remaining Conference League first qualifying round spot was passed to the fourth-placed team.)
4	Elimai	26	14	6	6	47	31	+16	48	Qualification for the Conference League first qualifying round
5	Aktobe	26	13	4	9	39	29	+10	43	

Source: UEFA, Soccerway
Rules for classification: 1) Points; 2) Goal difference; 3) Matches won; 4) Goals scored; 5) Away goals scored; 6) Head-to-head points; 7) Head-to-head matches won; 8) Head-to-head goal difference; 9) Head-to-head goals scored; 10) Head-to-head away goals scored; 11) Draw.
(C) Champions

=== Kazakhstan Cup ===
13 April 2025 Round of 16	Okzhetpes	1–1 (a.e.t.) (7–8 p)	Astana	Kokshetau
15:00 (UTC+5)	Mukhammed 21'; Adakhadzhiev (yellow card) 48'; Dosmagambetov (yellow card) 75'	Report	Karimov 64'; Marochkin (yellow card) 69'; Amanović (yellow card) 112'	Stadium: Okzhetpes Stadium; Attendance: 3,000; Referee: Sayat Sulikanov
	Penalties
	Flyuk (penalty scored); Idrisov (penalty scored); Satanov (penalty scored); Tazhibay (penalty scored); Dosmagambetov (penalty scored); Prce (penalty scored); Cuckić (penalty scored); Shamshi (penalty missed)		(penalty scored) Karimov; (penalty scored) Kalaica; (penalty scored) Amanović; (penalty scored) Basmanov; (penalty scored) Astanov; (penalty scored) Bartolec; (penalty scored) Kenesov; (penalty scored) Vorogovsky

14 May 2025 Quarter-final	Zhenis	1–1 (4–3 p)	Astana	Astana
20:00 (UTC+5)	Anuarbekov (yellow card) 24'; Mika 90+6'; Adil (yellow card) 102'	Report	Kenesov (yellow card) 9'; Astanov (yellow card) 47'; Marochkin 57'; Amanović (yellow card) 77'; Kažukolovas (yellow card) 114'	Stadium: Astana Arena; Attendance: 8.400; Referee: Sayat Karabaev
	Penalties
	Mika (penalty scored); Teixeira (penalty scored); Gian (penalty scored); Tevzadze (penalty scored)		(penalty scored) Shomko; (penalty scored) Bartolec; (penalty scored) Amanović; (penalty missed) Basmanov; (penalty missed) Vorogovsky

=== UEFA Conference League ===
==== Qualifying rounds ====
24 July 2025 Second qualifying round 1st leg	Astana (Kazakhstan)	1–1	(Moldova) Zimbru Chișinău	Astana, Kazakhstan
19:00 (UTC+5)	Bašić 56'	Report	Dahan 45+1'	Stadium: Astana Arena; Attendance: 23,524; Referee: Amine Kourgheli (Belarus)

31 July 2025 Second qualifying round 2nd leg	Zimbru Chișinău (Moldova)	0–2 (1–3 agg.)	(Kazakhstan) Astana	Chișinău, Moldova
22:00 (UTC+5)	Sharkovskiy (yellow card) 34'; Fratea (yellow card) 56'	Report	Chinedu 18'; Camara 21'; Seysen (yellow card) 90+3'	Stadium: Zimbru Stadium; Attendance: 8,572; Referee: Bram Van Driessche (Belgium)

7 August 2025 Third qualifying round 1st leg	Lausanne-Sport (Switzerland)	3–1	(Kazakhstan) Astana	Lausanne, Switzerland
23:15 (UTC+5)	Roche 24'; Sène 43'; Mouanga (yellow card) 53'; Dussenne (yellow card) 70'; Ajdini 72'	Report	Kažukolovas (yellow card) 10'; Bašić (yellow card) 22' (goal) 90'	Stadium: Stade de la Tuilière; Attendance: 9,008; Referee: Łukasz Kuzma (Poland)

14 August 2025 Third qualifying round 2nd leg	Astana (Kazakhstan)	0–2 (1–5 agg.)	(Switzerland) Lausanne-Sport	Astana, Kazakhstan
19:00 (UTC+5)	Bašić (yellow card) 15'; Vorogovsky (yellow card) 41'; Ebong (yellow card) 51' (yellow-red card) 86'; Beysebekov (yellow card) 75'	Report	Lekoueiry 48'; Diakité 66'; N'Diaye (yellow card) 90+2'	Stadium: Astana Arena; Attendance: 27,985; Referee: Martin Matoša (Slovenia)

== Squad statistics ==
As of match played 26 October 2025

=== Appearances and goals ===
No.	Pos	Nat	Player	Total		Premier League		Kazakhstan Cup		Conference League	
No.	Pos	Nat	Player	Apps	Goals	Apps	Goals	Apps	Goals	Apps	Goals
2	DF	(Croatia) CRO	Karlo Bartolec	31	0	25	0	0+2	0	4	0
3	DF	(Croatia) CRO	Branimir Kalaica	29	1	22+1	1	2	0	4	0
4	DF	(Kazakhstan) KAZ	Marat Bystrov	6	0	1+3	0	2	0	0	0
5	DF	(Lithuania) LTU	Kipras Kažukolovas	22	0	16+1	0	0+1	0	4	0
6	DF	(Kazakhstan) KAZ	Yan Vorogovsky	22	0	14+2	0	2	0	4	0
7	MF	(Belarus) BLR	Max Ebong	29	3	23+1	3	0+2	0	2+1	0
8	MF	(Bosnia and Herzegovina) BIH	Ivan Bašić	15	2	9+2	0	0	0	4	2
9	FW	(Nigeria) NGR	Geoffrey Chinedu	31	12	21+5	11	1	0	4	1
10	MF	(Croatia) CRO	Marin Tomasov	29	12	23+2	12	0	0	3+1	0
11	FW	(Montenegro) MNE	Driton Camaj	10	1	0+8	1	0	0	0+2	0
14	FW	(Kazakhstan) KAZ	Nurali Zhaksylykov	19	3	4+11	3	2	0	0+2	0
15	DF	(Kazakhstan) KAZ	Abzal Beysebekov	30	1	1+23	1	2	0	0+4	0
18	DF	(Kazakhstan) KAZ	Dmitry Shomko	15	0	13	0	0+1	0	0+1	0
22	DF	(Kazakhstan) KAZ	Aleksandr Marochkin	19	2	12+3	1	2	1	1+1	0
28	FW	(Guinea) GUI	Ousmane Camara	31	10	25+1	9	1	0	4	1
45	DF	(North Macedonia) MKD	Aleksa Amanović	29	1	20+4	1	1+1	0	3	0
72	FW	(Kazakhstan) KAZ	Stanislav Basmanov	18	2	2+13	2	2	0	0+1	0
74	GK	(Kazakhstan) KAZ	Mukhammedzhan Seysen	20	0	17	0	0	0	2+1	0
77	MF	(Albania) ALB	Nazmi Gripshi	29	16	24+2	16	0	0	3	0
81	FW	(Kazakhstan) KAZ	Ramazan Karimov	29	4	5+18	3	1+1	1	0+4	0
93	GK	(Croatia) CRO	Josip Čondrić	13	0	9	0	2	0	2	0
Players away from Astana on loan:
8	MF	(Kazakhstan) KAZ	Arman Kenesov	6	0	0+4	0	1+1	0	0	0
11	FW	(Nigeria) NGR	Nnamdi Ahanonu	1	0	0+1	0	0	0	0	0
21	MF	(Kazakhstan) KAZ	Elkhan Astanov	12	1	0+10	1	1+1	0	0	0
Players who left Astana during the season:

=== Goal scorers ===
Place	Position	Nation	Number	Name	Premier League	Kazakhstan Cup	UEFA Conference League	Total
1	MF	(Albania)	77	Nazmi Gripshi	16	0	0	16
2	MF	(Croatia)	10	Marin Tomasov	12	0	0	12
2	FW	(Nigeria)	9	Geoffrey Chinedu	11	0	1	12
4	FW	(Guinea)	28	Ousmane Camara	9	0	1	10
5	FW	(Kazakhstan)	81	Ramazan Karimov	3	1	0	4
6	FW	(Kazakhstan)	14	Nurali Zhaksylykov	3	0	0	3
6	MF	(Belarus)	7	Max Ebong	3	0	0	3
8	FW	(Kazakhstan)	72	Stanislav Basmanov	2	0	0	2
8	DF	(Kazakhstan)	22	Aleksandr Marochkin	1	1	0	2
8	MF	(Bosnia and Herzegovina)	8	Ivan Bašić	0	0	2	2
11	DF	(Kazakhstan)	15	Abzal Beysebekov	1	0	0	1
11	DF	(Croatia)	3	Branimir Kalaica	1	0	0	1
11	MF	(Kazakhstan)	21	Elkhan Astanov	1	0	0	1
11	FW	(Montenegro)	11	Driton Camaj	1	0	0	1
11	DF	(North Macedonia)	45	Aleksa Amanović	1	0	0	1
11				Own goal	1	0	0	1
				TOTALS	66	2	4	72

=== Clean sheets ===
Place	Position	Nation	Number	Name	Premier League	Kazakhstan Cup	UEFA Conference League	Total
1	GK	(Kazakhstan)	74	Mukhammedzhan Seysen	6	0	1	7
2	GK	(Croatia)	93	Josip Čondrić	3	0	1	4
				TOTALS	9	0	1	10

Josip Čondrić & Mukhammedzhan Seysen both played in Astana's 2-0 victory over Zimbru Chișinău on 31 July 2025

=== Disciplinary record ===
Number	Nation	Position	Name	Premier League		Kazakhstan Cup		UEFA Conference League		Total	
Number	Nation	Position	Name	Booked	Sent off (straight red)	Booked	Sent off (straight red)	Booked	Sent off (straight red)	Booked	Sent off (straight red)
2	(Croatia)	DF	Karlo Bartolec	2	0	0	0	0	0	2	0
3	(Croatia)	DF	Branimir Kalaica	5	0	0	0	0	0	5	0
4	(Kazakhstan)	DF	Marat Bystrov	1	0	0	0	0	0	1	0
5	(Lithuania)	DF	Kipras Kažukolovas	0	0	1	0	1	0	2	0
6	(Kazakhstan)	DF	Yan Vorogovsky	2	1	0	0	1	0	3	1
7	(Belarus)	MF	Max Ebong	3	0	0	0	2	1	5	1
8	(Bosnia and Herzegovina)	MF	Ivan Bašić	0	0	0	0	2	0	2	0
9	(Nigeria)	FW	Geoffrey Chinedu	2	0	0	0	0	0	2	0
10	(Croatia)	MF	Marin Tomasov	3	0	0	0	0	0	3	0
11	(Montenegro)	FW	Driton Camaj	1	0	0	0	0	0	1	0
14	(Kazakhstan)	FW	Nurali Zhaksylykov	2	0	0	0	0	0	2	0
15	(Kazakhstan)	DF	Abzal Beysebekov	3	0	0	0	1	0	4	0
18	(Kazakhstan)	DF	Dmitry Shomko	2	0	0	0	0	0	2	0
22	(Kazakhstan)	DF	Aleksandr Marochkin	2	0	0	0	0	0	2	0
28	(Guinea)	FW	Ousmane Camara	1	0	0	0	0	0	1	0
45	(North Macedonia)	DF	Aleksa Amanović	8	0	2	0	0	0	10	0
72	(Kazakhstan)	FW	Stanislav Basmanov	2	0	0	0	0	0	2	0
74	(Kazakhstan)	GK	Mukhammedzhan Seysen	0	0	0	0	1	0	1	0
81	(Kazakhstan)	FW	Ramazan Karimov	2	0	0	0	0	0	2	0
93	(Croatia)	GK	Josip Čondrić	1	0	0	0	0	0	1	0
Players away on loan:
8	(Kazakhstan)	MF	Arman Kenesov	0	0	1	0	0	0	1	0
21	(Kazakhstan)	MF	Elkhan Astanov	2	0	1	0	0	0	3	0
Players who left Astana during the season:
			TOTALS	43	1	6	0	8	1	57	2
