= Dmitry Shomko =

Kazakhstani footballer

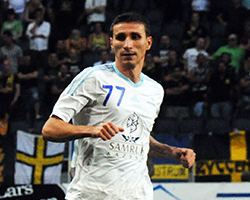

Personal information
- Full name: Dmitry Andreyevich Shomko
- Date of birth: 19 March 1990 (age 36)
- Place of birth: Ekibastuz, Kazakh SSR, Soviet Union
- Height: 1.87 m (6 ft 2 in)
- Position: Left-back

Team information
- Current team: Astana
- Number: 18

Youth career
- Ekibastuzets

Senior career*
Years	Team	Apps	(Gls)
2006–2007	Batyr Ekibastuz	27	(1)
2007	→ Ekibastuzets (loan)	3	(0)
2008	Ekibastuzets	6	(0)
2009–2014	Irtysh	101	(7)
2011	→ Astana (loan)	11	(0)
2014–2020	Astana	183	(7)
2021	Rotor Volgograd	4	(0)
2021–2023	Aktobe	48	(1)
2024–2025	Yelimay	17	(0)
2025–	Astana	25	(1)

International career^{‡}
2006	Kazakhstan U-17	5	(0)
2009–2011	Kazakhstan U-21	17	(1)
2011–	Kazakhstan	48	(2)
- * Club domestic league appearances and goals as of 1 November 2026 ‡ National team caps and goals as of 17 April 2023

Dmitry Andreyevich Shomko (Russian: Дмитрий Андреевич Шомко; born 19 March 1990) is a Kazakh football player who plays as a left-back for Astana and the Kazakhstan national team.

== Club career ==
Shomko began his career in 2006 with FC Batyr Ekibastuz. He has been playing for Irtysh since 2009. He also played also the 2011/2012 season on loan for Irtysh's League rival Astana. On 12 January 2021, Astana confirmed that Shomko had left the club following the expiration of his contract.

On 13 January 2021, Shomko signed with Russian Premier League club Rotor Volgograd.

On 2 July 2021, Aktobe announced the signing of Shomko.

== International career ==
He made his international debut for Kazakhstan in 2011.

== Career statistics ==
=== Club ===
As of match played 3 July 2026

Club	Season	League			National Cup		Continental		Other		Total	
Club	Season	Division	Apps	Goals	Apps	Goals	Apps	Goals	Apps	Goals	Apps	Goals
Batyr Ekibastuz	2006	Kazakhstan First Division	9	0			—		—		9	0
Batyr Ekibastuz	2007	Kazakhstan First Division	18	1			—		—		18	1
Batyr Ekibastuz	Total		27	1			—		—		27	1
Ekibastuzets (loan)	2006	Kazakhstan Premier League	3	0			—		—		3	0
Ekibastuzets	2008	Kazakhstan Premier League	6	0			—		—		6	0
Irtysh Pavlodar	2009	Kazakhstan Premier League	19	2	3	0	2	0	—		24	2
Irtysh Pavlodar	2010	Kazakhstan Premier League	30	1	1	0	—		—		31	1
Irtysh Pavlodar	2011	Kazakhstan Premier League	0	0	0	0	—		—		0	0
Irtysh Pavlodar	2012	Kazakhstan Premier League	25	0			—		—		25	0
Irtysh Pavlodar	2013	Kazakhstan Premier League	27	4			4	1	—		31	4
Irtysh Pavlodar	Total		101	7	4	0	6	1	—		111	8
Astana (loan)	2011	Kazakhstan Premier League	11	0	0	0	—		1	0	12	0
Astana	2014	Kazakhstan Premier League	27	2	1	0	6	2	—		34	4
Astana	2015	Kazakhstan Premier League	26	1	5	0	11	1	1	0	43	2
Astana	2016	Kazakhstan Premier League	29	1	1	0	11	0	1	0	42	1
Astana	2017	Kazakhstan Premier League	31	1	0	0	12	0	1	0	44	1
Astana	2018	Kazakhstan Premier League	23	2	0	0	14	1	1	0	38	3
Astana	2019	Kazakhstan Premier League	31	0	1	0	11	1	1	0	44	1
Astana	2020	Kazakhstan Premier League	16	0	0	0	2	0	1	0	19	0
Astana	Total		183	7	8	0	67	5	6	0	264	12
Rotor Volgograd	2020–21	Russian Premier League	4	0	0	0	—		—		4	0
Aktobe	2021	Kazakhstan Premier League	6	0	2	0	—		—		8	0
Aktobe	2022	Kazakhstan Premier League	24	0	4	0	—		—		28	0
Aktobe	2023	Kazakhstan Premier League	18	1	2	0	4	0	—		24	1
Aktobe	Total		48	1	8	0	4	0	0	0	60	1
Yelimay	2024	Kazakhstan Premier League	17	0	3	1	—		5	0	25	1
Astana	2025	Kazakhstan Premier League	13	0	1	0	1	0	—		15	0
Astana	2026	Kazakhstan Premier League	8	0	1	0	0	0	—		9	0
Astana	Total		21	0	2	0	1	0	0	0	24	0
Career total			421	16	25	1	78	6	12	0	536	23

=== International ===
As of match played 19 November 2022

Appearances and goals by national team and year
National team	Year	Apps	Goals
Kazakhstan
Kazakhstan	2011	1	0
Kazakhstan	2012	0	0
Kazakhstan	2013	7	2
Kazakhstan	2014	7	0
Kazakhstan	2015	6	0
Kazakhstan	2016	8	0
Kazakhstan	2017	5	0
Kazakhstan	2018	5	0
Kazakhstan	2019	6	0
Kazakhstan	2021	1	0
Kazakhstan	2022	2	0
Total		48	2

As of match played 19 November 2022
Kazakhstan score listed first, score column indicates score after each Shomko goal.

List of international goals scored by Ramazan Orazov
No.	Date	Venue	Cap	Opponent	Score	Result	Competition
1	4 June 2013	Central Stadium, Almaty, Kazakhstan	3	Bulgaria	1–2	1–2	Friendly
2	16 October 2013	Aviva Stadium, Dublin, Ireland	8	Republic of Ireland	1–0	1–3	2014 FIFA World Cup qual.

== Honours ==
Astana

- Kazakhstan Premier League: 2014
- Kazakhstan Super Cup: 2015
