= Marin Tomasov =

Croatian footballer (born 1987)

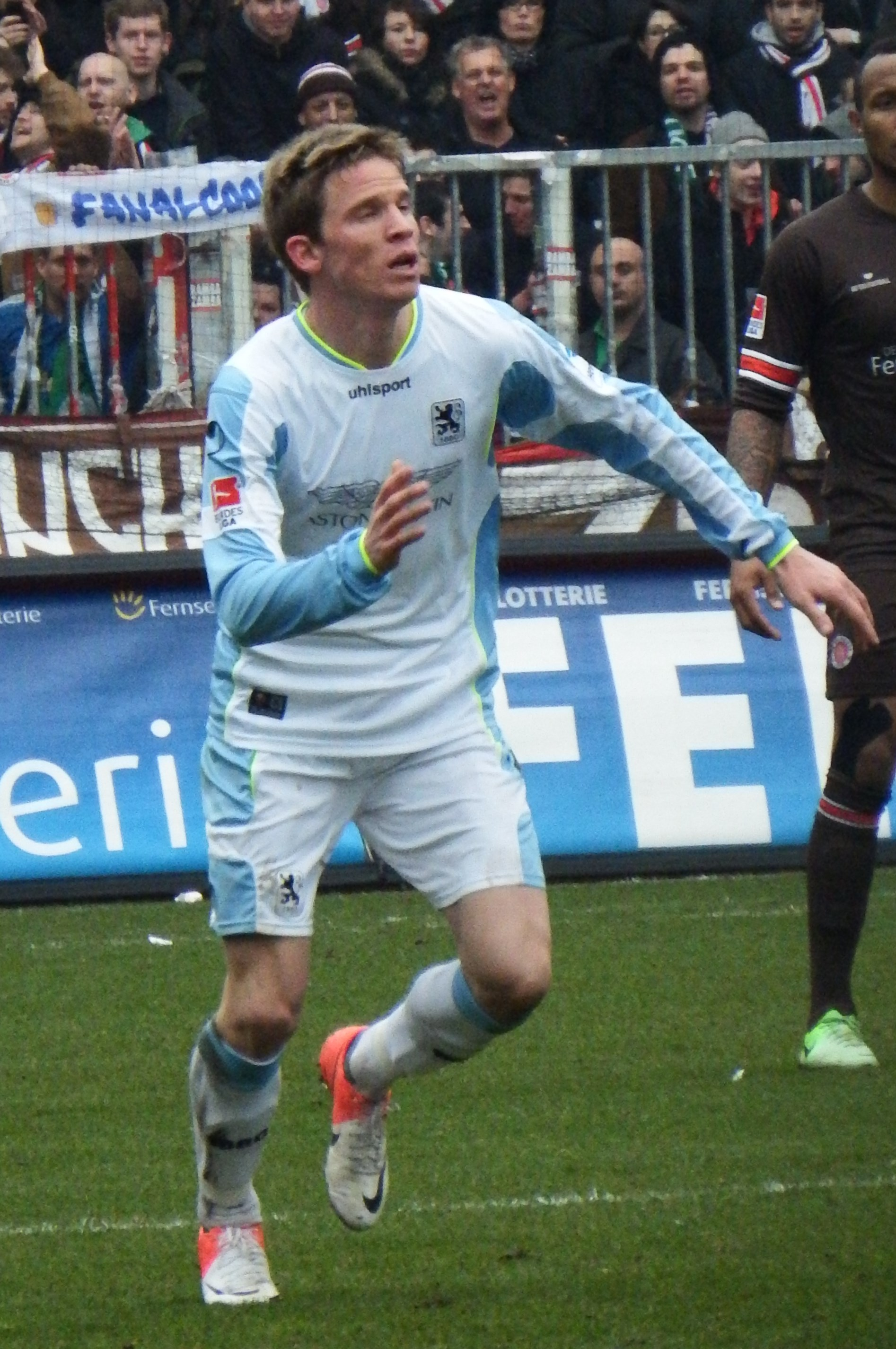
- Tomasov with TSV 1860 München in 2013

Personal information
- Date of birth: 31 August 1987 (age 39)
- Place of birth: Zadar, SR Croatia, Yugoslavia
- Height: 1.84 m (6 ft 0 in)
- Position: Winger

Team information
- Current team: Astana
- Number: 10

Youth career
- NK Sv. Mihovil
- Zadar

Senior career*
Years	Team	Apps	(Gls)
2006–2009	Zadar	72	(12)
2009–2012	Hajduk Split	76	(16)
2012–2015	1860 München	51	(3)
2015–2018	Rijeka	53	(16)
2016–2017	→ Al-Nassr (loan)	23	(4)
2017–2018	→ Astana (loan)	29	(8)
2018–	Astana	207	(98)

International career
2007–2008	Croatia U21	9	(1)
2013	Croatia	1	(0)
- * Club domestic league appearances and goals as of 1 November 2026

Marin Tomasov (born 31 August 1987) is a Croatian professional footballer who plays as a winger or an attacking midfielder for Kazakhstan Premier League club Astana.

== Club career ==
Coming from the village of Dobropoljana, on the island of Pašman, Tomasov entered the youth ranks of NK Sveti Mihovil, on the neighboring island of Ugljan, which represents both islands. Some years after, Tomasov was brought up through the NK Zadar youth academy and in 2006 he signed a professional contract with the senior team and was assigned the number 14 jersey. In the three seasons he spent at the club, spanning from 2006 to 2009, he made 72 appearances scoring 12 goals. His 2008–09 Prva HNL season was especially impressive and Croatian giants Hajduk Split were quick to snap him up in a deal worth over 350,000 euros in the summer of 2009. At his new club he retained his jersey number of 14 which he wore at NK Zadar.

=== Hajduk Split ===
In his first season at his new club, he found himself in and out of the starting line-up appearing 22 times in both league and cup games but only 11 of these were from the starting line-up. He managed only two goals in all of the 2009–10 Prva HNL and even though he was only 20 years old at the time, he stated himself that he was disappointed with his season and will be looking to improve in the future.

His 2010–11 season was just that. In the league he made 26 total appearances, 15 of which were starts and scored four goals but where he grabbed the most attention was his performances in the 2010–11 UEFA Europa League where he grabbed two goals in nine games and starred throughout the competition in both the group stage games and qualifying.

Tomasov started the 2011–12 Prva HNL season in exhilarating fashion scoring the winner in the opening game against HNK Šibenik in the 87th minute. His next goal came three games later when he scored the first in a 3–0 away win against NK Istra 1961. He also scored the next match in a home game against NK Zagreb where he grabbed the opener, scoring inside 50 seconds of the start of the match. He grabbed the opener again in the next match in the Split derby against RNK Split making it the third consecutive game in which he scored the opener, this time in the second minute.

=== 1860 München ===
In July 2012, Tomasov joined German 2nd Bundesliga side TSV 1860 München on a three-year contract.

=== Rijeka ===
On 10 January 2015, Tomasov signed a 3 1/2-year contract with HNK Rijeka in Croatia's Prva HNL. In his first season with the club he was prolific, netting 7 goals in 15 league appearances and one goal in three cup fixtures. He continued in the same fashion in the 2015–16 season. He scored both of Rijeka's goals in a 2–0 away win against RNK Split. He also scored from a free-kick and collected two assists in Rijeka's 3–0 away thumping of his former club, Hajduk Split. Tomasov's performances during 2015 did not go unnoticed and earned him the Prva HNL Player of the Year award. He was chosen as the best player in the league by captains of all Croatian First Football League clubs. He finished the 2015–16 season with 8 league goals and 12 assists to his account (the highest in the league). He was also the top scorer in the 2015–16 Croatian Football Cup with 5 goals. During the season, Tomasov did not miss a single match, collecting 43 appearances in as many competitive fixtures.

==== Al-Nassr (loan) ====
On 5 August 2016, Rijeka and Al-Nassr agreed terms for Tomasov's transfer to the Saudi club, with the deal valued at €2.8 million. In the first instance, Tomasov was loaned to the Saudi club until June 2017 for a fee of €800,000. The Saudi club then had an option to buy his contract outright for the remaining €2 million.

==== Astana (loan) ====
On 1 July 2017, Astana announced the signing of Tomasov on a year-long loan deal from Rijeka.

Following the end of the loan, on 4 July 2018 Tomasov was transferred from Rijeka to Astana for a fee of €500,000. In his first full season with Astana, Tomasov scored 19 goals in 47 games in all competitions, his 14 league goals helping his club to the 2018 Kazakhstan Premier League title.

In the 2019 FC Astana season, Tomasov was again the top goalscorer for his club, with 19 league goals and 7 Europa League goals. In the Round 31 league match against FC Aktobe, Tomasov scored 4 goals in 33 minutes in a 5–0 win. Astana confirmed a sixth consecutive league title with one round to spare and Tomasov was the league's top goalscorer.

== International career ==
Between 2007 and 2008, Tomasov was capped nine times and scored one goal for Croatia national under-21 football team. He has one cap for the Croatia national football team, earned in the 2–1 away win against South Korea on 10 September 2013.

== Career statistics ==
=== Club ===
As of match played 1 November 2026

Appearances and goals by club, season and competition
Club	Season	League			National cup (Note: Includes Croatian Football Cup, DFB-Pokal, King's Cup, Kazakhstan Cup)		League cup (Note: Includes Saudi Crown Prince Cup, Kazakhstan League Cup)		Continental		Other		Total	
Club	Season	Division	Apps	Goals	Apps	Goals	Apps	Goals	Apps	Goals	Apps	Goals	Apps	Goals
Zadar	2006–07	2. HNL	24	3	1	0	–		–		–		25	3
Zadar	2007–08	1. HNL	31	5	1	0	–		–		–		32	5
Zadar	2008–09	1. HNL	17	4	1	0	–		–		–		18	4
Zadar	Total		72	12	3	0	–		–		–		75	12
Hajduk Split	2008–09	1. HNL	13	1	3	1	–		–		–		16	2
Hajduk Split	2009–10	1. HNL	20	2	7	0	–		2 (Note: Appearances in UEFA Europa League)	0	–		29	2
Hajduk Split	2010–11	1. HNL	26	4	2	2	–		9	2	1 (Note: Appearance in Croatian Super Cup)	0	28	8
Hajduk Split	2011–12	1. HNL	17	9	2	0	–		2	0	–		21	8
Hajduk Split	Total		76	16	14	3	–		13	2	–		104	21
1860 München	2012–13	2. Bundesliga	26	2	3	0	–		–		–		29	2
1860 München	2013–14	2. Bundesliga	15	1	1	0	–		–		–		16	1
1860 München	2014–15	2. Bundesliga	10	0	2	0	–		–		–		12	0
1860 München	Total		51	3	6	0	–		–		–		57	3
Rijeka	2014–15	1. HNL	15	7	3	1	–		–		–		18	8
Rijeka	2015–16	1. HNL	36	8	5	5	–		2	1	–		43	14
Rijeka	2016–17	1. HNL	2	1	0	0	–		2	0	–		4	1
Rijeka	2017–18	1. HNL	0	0	0	0	–		–		–		0	1
Rijeka	Total		53	16	8	6	–		4	1	–		65	23
Al-Nassr (loan)	2016–17	Saudi Pro League	23	4	3	0	5	1	–		–		31	5
Astana (loan)	2017	Kazakhstan Premier League	11	2	0	0	–		8 (Note: Two appearances in UEFA Champions League, six appearances and one goal in UEFA Europa League)	1	0	0	19	3
Astana (loan)	2018	Kazakhstan Premier League	18	6	0	0	–		2	2	1 (Note: Appearance(s) in Kazakhstan Super Cup)	2	21	10
Astana (loan)	Total		29	8	0	0	–		10	3	1	2	40	13
Astana	2018	Kazakhstan Premier League	12	8	0	0	–		14 (Note: Six appearances in UEFA Champions League, eight appearances and one goal in UEFA Europa League)	1	0	0	26	9
Astana	2019	Kazakhstan Premier League	31	19	0	0	–		10 (Note: Two appearances in UEFA Champions League, eight appearances and seven goals in UEFA Europa League)	7	1	0	42	26
Astana	2020	Kazakhstan Premier League	17	4	0	0	–		2 (Note: One appearance and one goal in UEFA Champions League, one appearance in UEFA Europa League)	1	1	0	20	5
Astana	2021	Kazakhstan Premier League	23	17	6	2	–		3 (Note: Appearances in UEFA Conference League)	2	2	1	34	22
Astana	2022	Kazakhstan Premier League	25	15	4	0	–		0	0	–		29	15
Astana	2023	Kazakhstan Premier League	24	6	2	1	–		14 (Note: Four appearances in UEFA Champions League, two appearances in UEFA Europa League, eight appearances and two goals in UEFA Conference League)	2	1	0	41	9
Astana	2024	Kazakhstan Premier League	23	6	1	0	4	1	10	4	–		38	11
Astana	2025	Kazakhstan Premier League	25	12	0	0	0	0	4	0	–		29	12
Astana	2026	Kazakhstan Premier League	27	11	0	0	–		2	0	–		29	11
Astana	Total		207	98	13	3	4	1	59	17	5	1	288	120
Career total			511	157	47	12	9	2	86	23	7	3	660	197

== Honours ==
Zadar

- Druga HNL play-off winner: 2006–07

Hajduk Split

- Croatian Cup: 2009–10
- Croatian Super Cup runner-up: 2010

Astana

- Kazakhstan Premier League: 2017, 2018, 2019, 2022
- Kazakhstan League Cup: 2024
- Kazakhstan Super Cup: 2018, 2019, 2020, 2019, 2023

Individual

- Croatian Football Hope of the Year: 2008
- Tportal Prva HNL Player of the Year: 2015
- Croatian Cup Top Scorer: 2015–16
- Croatian First Football League Most Assists: 2015–16
- Kazakhstan Premier League Most Assists: 2018
- Kazakhstan Premier League Top Scorer: 2021
