= FC Astana =

Association football club in Kazakhstan

Astana
- Full name: Astana futbol kluby Астана футбол клубы Astana Football Club
- Nicknames: Sary-Kökter, Жёлто-синие (The Yellow-and-Blues); Astanalyqtar, Астанчане (The Astanans); Qalalyqtar, Горожане (The Citizens)
- Founded: 2009; 17 years ago as Lokomotiv Astana
- Stadium: Astana Arena
- Capacity: 30,254
- Owner: Samruk-Kazyna
- General manager: Arslan Bespayev
- Manager: Grigory Babayan
- League: Premier League
- 2026: Premier League, 3rd of 16
- Website: fcastana.kz
Home colours	Away colours

Astana Football Club (Kazakh: Астана футбол клубы, Astana futbol kluby) is a professional football club based in Astana. They compete in the Kazakhstan Premier League, the highest tier of Kazakh football. The club's home ground is the 30,000-seat Astana Arena stadium. The club colours, reflected in their badge and kit, are sky blue and yellow. Founded as Lokomotiv Astana in 2009, the club changed its name to Astana in 2011.

The club has won a record seven league titles, three Kazakhstan Cups and six Kazakhstan Super Cups.

== History ==
=== Founding and first years (2009–2014) ===
On 27 December 2008, football clubs from Almaty Megasport and Alma-Ata announced they would merge to found a new club. The club was named "FC Lokomotiv Astana" as the National Railway Company Kazakhstan Temir Zholy became a general sponsor. Kazakhstan Temir Zholy in cooperation with City Council of Astana decided to move the club to the new building stadium in the capital of Kazakhstan. Vakhid Masudov became the first head coach in the club's history. The club has benefited from a high salary role which has enabled them to attract players of status to the club. Andrey Tikhonov and Yegor Titov first of all came from the Russian Football Premier League. Several more followed such as Patrick Ovie and Baffour Gyan. Maksim Shatskikh later arrived from Dynamo Kyiv in the Ukrainian Premier League which was again a very high-profile capture for the club. The majority of their other players have arrived from other clubs of the Kazakhstan Premier League, mostly on free transfers from the clubs which were absorbed to make the club and several which went into bankruptcy.

On 8 March 2009, Lokomotiv played in the league's inaugural match against Kazakhmys in Satbayev. In March 2009, Vakhid Masudov was replaced by Vladimir Gulyamkhaidarov. However, only two days after his appointment he was replaced by Russian specialist Sergei Yuran. The club earned silver medals in their first season of play. On 14 November 2010, Holger Fach guided Astana to their first Kazakhstan Cup success. However, they were ineligible for a UEFA license since they had not yet existed for at least three years. So they were not able to start in the 2011–12 UEFA Europa League. On 2 March 2011, Astana beat Tobol 2–1 and won the Kazakhstan Super Cup for the first time. In 2012, Miroslav Beránek led Astana to win their second Kazakhstan Cup. In July 2013, the club made a debut in Europe playing in the first qualifying round of the UEFA Europa League against Botev Plovdiv. Astana lost both matches, 0–1 at home and 0–5 away. On 4 July 2013, Astana officially joined to newly created Astana Presidential Sports Club, the organization supported by the Sovereign Wealth Fund Samruk-Kazyna to combine the main sports teams in Astana.

=== Stoilov years: Domestic dominance and European breakthrough (2014–2018) ===
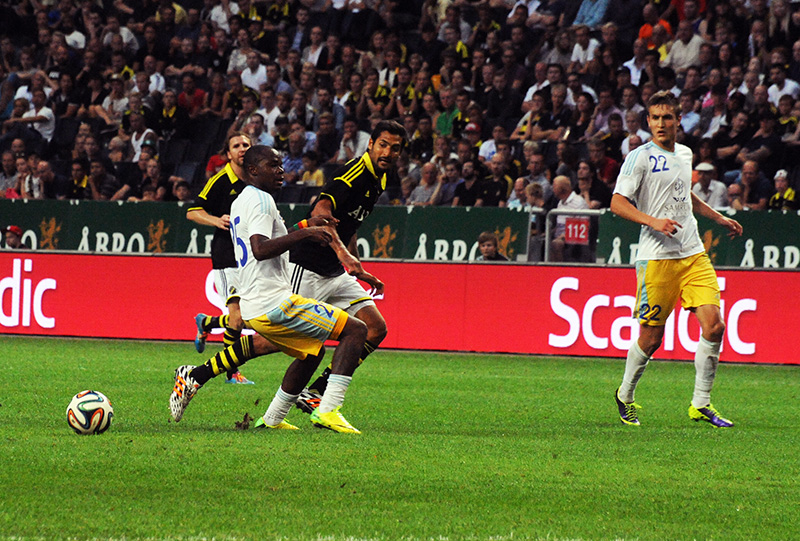
Match against AIK in 2014

On 22 June 2014, the club announced that former Botev Plovdiv manager Stanimir Stoilov was appointed as new head coach. In 2014–15 European campaign, Astana played four ties in the UEFA Europa League qualifying stages. In the first round they beat Pyunik 6–1 on aggregate, then raised more than a few eyebrows in the second round, beating Hapoel Tel Aviv 3–1 on aggregate thanks to a convincing home leg win. The third qualifying round saw Astana cruise past AIK, with a 4–1 aggregate score. In the play-off round, Astana was defeated by Villarreal. On 1 November 2014, Astana became Kazakhstan Premier League champions for the first time in their history, securing the championship with a 3–0 home win against Kaisar.

On 1 March 2015, Astana won the 2015 Kazakhstan Super Cup, beating Kairat 3–2 in a penalty shoot-out after the match ended with the score 0–0. On 26 August 2015, the club became the first team from Kazakhstan to reach the group stage of the UEFA Champions League, after beating APOEL 2–1 on aggregate in the play-off round. They were drawn in Group C alongside Benfica, Atlético Madrid and Galatasaray, where they managed to obtain four points in six games after four draws and two losses. On 8 November 2015, Astana clinched their second Kazakhstan Premier League title beating Aktobe 1–0 at home in the last tour game. On 9 December 2015, the club extended their contract with Stanimir Stoilov for the next two years.

In the 2016 season, Astana was eliminated from UEFA Champions League after two stages, being defeated by Celtic in the third qualifying round 3–2 on aggregate. However, the club qualified for the UEFA Europa League group stage, beating BATE in the play-off round. On 26 October 2016, Astana won their third straight championship under Stoilov's rule. On 19 November 2016, the club won the 2016 Kazakhstan Cup, defeating Kairat 1–0. Their 2017 Champions League bid was stopped short once again by Celtic, this time in the playoff round. Following an embarrassing 5–0 rout in Glasgow, they failed to reach the group stages in an 8–4 defeat on aggregate. However, Astana reached another milestone by reaching the knockout phase of the 2017–18 UEFA Europa League after finishing second in the group phase. Astana extended further its domestic dominance by winning fourth consecutive title in the 2017 season. On 8 January 2018, Stoilov signed a new contract with Astana, but left the club on 1 March 2018 to take over the vacant Kazakhstan national football team's manager position.

=== Post Stoilov years: (2018–) ===
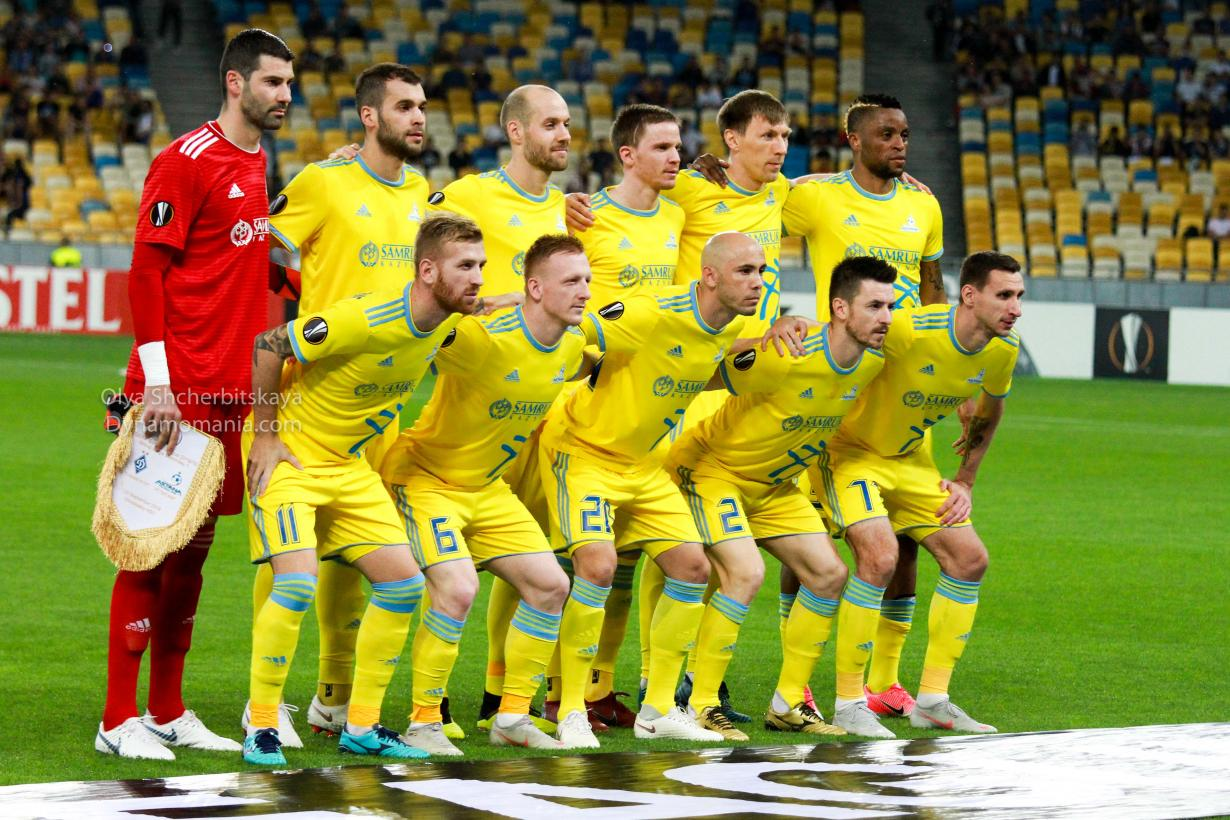
FC Astana in 2018

On the same day as Stoilov was announced as the new manager of Kazakhstan, 1 March 2018, Grigori Babayan was announced as the Astana's interim manager. On 1 June 2018, Astana announced Roman Hryhorchuk as the club's new manager. On 17 August 2018, Hryhorchuk left Astana on compassionate leave with Grigori Babayan again stepping in as Caretaker Manager. Astana announced on 3 January 2019 that Hryhorchuk would return to lead the team after missing the second half of the 2018 season due to family reasons. On 14 January 2019, Paul Ashworth was announced as the new executive director of FC Astana. Hryhorchuk left Astana by mutual consent on 13 January 2020. The following day, 14 January 2020, Michal Bílek was announced as the new head coach of Astana.

On 18 February 2020, Astana revealed a new logo to commemorate 10-years of the club.

On 26 August 2020, with Astana 2nd in the league and having just been knocked out of the UEFA Champions League, Michal Bílek was sacked as manager, with Executive Director Paul Ashworth taking over in a caretaker capacity. Ashworth his role as caretaker manager and executive director by mutual consent on 7 October 2020. Two days later, 9 October, David Loria was announced as the club's new executive director. On 16 October 2020, former captain Andrey Tikhonov was appointed as the club's new manager.

On 5 November 2021, Astana announced the departure of Andrey Tikhonov as their manager, with Srđan Blagojević being announced as the club's new head coach on 21 November 2021. On 13 September 2022, Blagojević left Astana by mutual consent to become head coach of Debreceni, with Grigori Babayan returning to the club as their new head coach. Astana qualified for the UEFA Europa Conference League group stage in the 2023–24 season and finished 3rd in their group.

== Stadium ==
Astana's current home venue is Astana Arena. The stadium has been Astana's home since the mid of the 2009 season, when the club moved from the Kazhymukan Munaitpasov Stadium. The stadium holds 30,254 and has a retractable roof. The inaugural match at the new stadium was a 2–1 win over the Kazakhstan national under-21 football team in a friendly match. It is also serves as a national stadium for the Kazakhstan national football team.

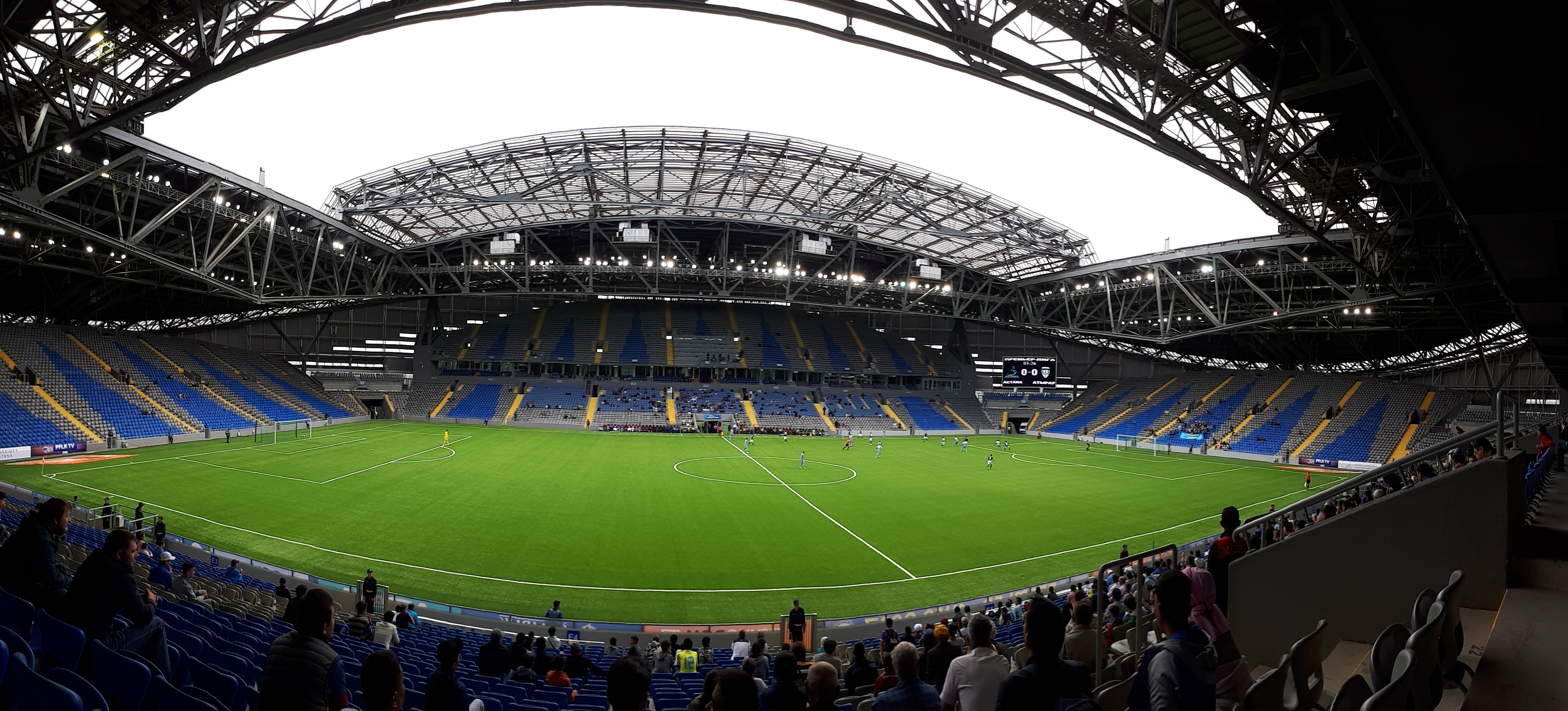
A panorama of Astana Arena from the Eastern Stand, showing from left to right the Southern Stand, the Western Stand and the Northern Stand

== Colours and crest ==
Crest used as Lokomotiv Astana

Crest used from 2020–2023

The team's original crest was introduced in 2009, featuring the team's name, 'Football Club Lokomotiv Astana', on a blue circular frame, with a blue letter 'L' in the centre symbolising a railway track. Following the club's renaming in 2011, a new crest was adopted. It displayed the team's name in uppercase letters on an image of a football, accompanied by the words 'football club' in Kazakh and Russian at the top and bottom of the crest. On 23 January 2013, the club unveiled a new crest that echoed the style and colours of the Lokomotiv Astana crest. It featured an image of a football in a shanyrak style, flanked by two Kazakh national patterns on each side. The current crest was introduced on 10 March 2014, incorporating the style and colours of the Astana Presidential Club crest, as well as those of BC Astana, the Astana Pro Team, and the Astana Dakar Team. The crest now consists of the team's name, 'Astana Football Club', placed beneath a flying ball.

Blue and white were initially the club's primary colours, and the team's nickname was the 'Blue‑and‑White'. Blue was used as an accent colour on the home jersey, while white was the main colour of the away kit. During the 2012 season, Astana wore yellow and blue striped shirts with blue shorts as the home kit, and a wholly blue away kit. In 2013, they reverted to the original colours used from 2009 to 2011. That same year, the club joined the Astana Presidential Club and adopted its colours. The current club colours are sky blue and yellow. Astana's current shirt sponsor is the Sovereign Wealth Fund Samruk-Kazyna. The club's first kit sponsorship was from the national railway company Kazakhstan Temir Zholy, which sponsored the club for four years before ending the deal in 2013. The team's kit supplier has been Adidas since the club's inception.

In March 2023, Astana announced Chery as their new sponsor, whilst also confirming their switch to Nike.

The club announced the return of their old crest after competing in their Europa Conference League group.

Period	Kit manufacturer	Shirt sponsor
2009–2014	Adidas	Kazakhstan Temir Zholy
2014–22	Adidas	Samruk-Kazyna
2023–	Nike	Samruk-Kazyna

== Players ==
=== First team squad ===
As of 20 July 2026

Note: Flags indicate national team as defined under FIFA eligibility rules; some limited exceptions apply. Players may hold more than one non-FIFA nationality.

No.	Pos.	Nation	Player
2	DF	CRO	Karlo Bartolec
3	DF	CRO	Branimir Kalaica
4	DF	KAZ	Sanzhar Anuarov
5	DF	LTU	Kipras Kažukolovas
6	DF	KAZ	Alibek Kasym
7	MF	KAZ	Dinmukhamed Karaman
8	MF	BIH	Ivan Bašić
9	MF	KAZ	Bauyrzhan Islamkhan
10	MF	CRO	Marin Tomasov
11	DF	KAZ	Yan Vorogovsky
15	DF	KAZ	Abzal Beysebekov (captain)
17	MF	KAZ	Damir Marat (on loan from Tobol)
20	FW	NGR	Nnamdi Ahanonu
21	MF	KAZ	Aleksandr Merkel

No.	Pos.	Nation	Player
29	FW	CRO	Nikola Burić
45	DF	SRB	Ivan Miladinović
47	MF	KAZ	Maksat Abrayev
52	DF	KAZ	Timur Tokenov
57	FW	KAZ	Akhmetali Kaltanov
72	FW	KAZ	Stanislav Basmanov
74	GK	KAZ	Mukhammedzhan Seysen
77	DF	KAZ	Dmitry Shomko
81	FW	KAZ	Ramazan Karimov
82	MF	KAZ	Ruslan Valikhan
91	DF	KAZ	Aytuar Token
93	GK	CRO	Josip Čondrić
99	GK	KAZ	Danila Karpikov

=== Out on loan ===
Note: Flags indicate national team as defined under FIFA eligibility rules; some limited exceptions apply. Players may hold more than one non-FIFA nationality.

No.	Pos.	Nation	Player
19	FW	KAZ	Nurali Zhaksylykov (at Kaisar)
21	MF	KAZ	Elkhan Astanov (at Ordabasy)
80	MF	KAZ	Arman Kenesov (at Aktobe)

For recent transfers, see List of Kazakhstan football transfers summer 2026.

=== Retired numbers ===
No.	Player	Nationality	Position	Astana debut	Last match	Ref
1	Nenad Erić	Kazakhstan	Goalkeeper	12 March 2011	27 November 2020	

== Non-playing staff ==
=== Management ===
Position	Staff
Chairman	(Kazakhstan) Sayan Khamitzhanov
General Manager	(Kazakhstan) Gazinur Alimov
Executive Director	(Kazakhstan) Baglan Yergeshev
CEO'S Counselor	(Kazakhstan) Sayan Khamitzhanov
Sports Director	(Russia) Igor Pavlyuk
Finance director	(Ukraine) Luibov Krainova

Last updated: 18 January 2022
Source: fcastana.kz

=== Coaching staff ===
Position	Staff
Manager	(Kazakhstan) Grigori Babayan
Assistant Manager	(Kazakhstan) Aleksandr Moskalenko
Assistant Manager	(Bulgaria) Said Ibraimov
First Team Goalkeeping Coach	(Serbia) Milan Stojkovic
First Team Fitness Coach	(Kazakhstan) Arkadiy Bakulin
First Team Analyst	(Kazakhstan) Amal Ayazov

Last updated: 22 January 2022
Source: FC Astana

=== Notable managers ===
The following managers won at least one trophy when in charge of Astana:

Name	Period	Trophies
(Germany) Holger Fach	2010–2011	Kazakhstan Cup, Kazakhstan Super Cup
(Czech Republic) Miroslav Beránek	2012–2013	Kazakhstan Cup
(Bulgaria) Stanimir Stoilov	2014–2018	Kazakhstan Premier League (4), Kazakhstan Cup, Kazakhstan Super Cup
(Kazakhstan) Grigori Babayan	2018	Kazakhstan Premier League, Kazakhstan Super Cup
(Ukraine) Roman Hryhorchuk	2018–2020	Kazakhstan Premier League, Kazakhstan Super Cup
(Czech Republic) Michal Bílek	2020	Kazakhstan Super Cup
(Kazakhstan) Grigori Babayan	2022–present	Kazakhstan Premier League, Kazakhstan Super Cup, Kazakhstan League Cup

== Honours ==
- Kazakhstan Premier League
  - Winners (7): 2014, 2015, 2016, 2017, 2018, 2019, 2022
  - Runners-up (5): 2009, 2013, 2021, 2023, 2024, 2025
- Kazakhstan Cup
  - Winners (3): 2010, 2012, 2016
  - Runners-up (1): 2015
- Kazakhstan League Cup
  - Winners (1): 2024
- Kazakhstan Super Cup
  - Winners (6): 2011, 2015, 2018, 2019, 2020, 2023
  - Runners-up (4): 2013, 2016, 2017, 2021

== Statistics ==
=== Seasons ===
Season	Rank	Pld	W	D	L	GF	GA	GD	Pts	Cup	LC	CL	EL	ECL
2009	2	26	20	0	6	54	24	30	60	2R	—	—	—	—
2010	4	32	14	8	10	41	28	13	50	Won	—	—	—	—
2011	4	32	16	7	9	50	37	13	33	2R	—	—	—	—
2012	5	26	13	7	6	34	24	10	46	Won	—	—	—	—
2013	2	32	19	5	8	56	28	28	38	QF	—	—	1QR	—
2014	1	32	18	10	4	63	26	37	45	SF	—	—	PO	—
2015	1	32	20	7	5	55	26	39	46	Runner-up	—	GS	—	—
2016	1	32	23	4	5	47	21	26	73	Won	—	3QR	GS	—
2017	1	33	25	4	4	74	21	51	76	R16	—	PO	R32	—
2018	1	33	24	5	4	68	22	40	77	R16	—	3QR	GS	—
2019	1	33	22	3	8	67	28	39	69	R16	—	1QR	GS	—
2020	3	20	11	3	6	32	21	11	36	—	—	1QR	2QR	—
2021	2	26	17	6	3	53	25	28	57	SF	—	—		3QR
2022	1	26	16	5	5	65	24	41	53	SF	—	—		2QR
2023	2	26	16	5	5	36	24	12	53	SF	—	2QR	3QR	GS
2024	2	24	14	4	6	39	19	20	46	QF	Won	—		GS
2025	2	26	17	6	3	66	30	36	57	QF	—	—		3QR
2026	3	30	15	9	6	48	31	17	54	R16F	—	—		1QR

Key

Rank = Rank in the Kazakhstan Premier League; P = Played; W = Win; D = Draw; L = Loss; F = Goals for; A = Goals against; GD = Goal difference; Pts = Points; Cup = Kazakhstan Cup; LC = Kazakhstan League Cup; CL = UEFA Champions League; EL = UEFA Europa League; ECL = UEFA Europa Conference League.
in = Still in competition; — = Not attended; 1R = 1st round; 2R = 2nd round; 3R = 3rd round; 1QR = 1st qualifying round; 2QR = 2nd qualifying round; 3QR = 3rd qualifying round; PO = Play-off round; GS = Group stage; R32 = Round of 32; R16 = Round of 16; QF = Quarter-finals; SF = Semi-finals; F = Final.

=== Records ===
As of match played 31 October 2026

- Record European victory 4–0 v. Maccabi Tel Aviv (19 October 2017)
- Record European defeat 6–0 v. AZ (24 October 2019)
- Record League victory – 7–0 v. Atyrau (9 September 2017), Turan (18 July 2025)
- Record League defeat – 0–5 v. Irtysh (26 May 2011)
- Most consecutive League game wins – 8, 7 April 2009 – 30 April 2009
- Most League appearances – 341, Abzal Beisebekov 2009, 2012–Present
- Most appearances overall – 472, Abzal Beisebekov 2009, 2012–Present
- Most goals scored in a League season – 19, Junior Kabananga 2017 & Marin Tomasov 2019
- Most goals scored in a season overall – 26, Marin Tomasov 2019
- Youngest first-team player – Madi Zhakypbayev, 15 years, 11 months, 21 days
- Oldest first-team player – Andrey Tikhonov, 39 years, 9 days

== European record ==
=== UEFA club competition record ===
As of match played 16 July 2026

Competition	GP	W	D	L	GF	GA	+/-
UEFA Champions League	35	12	11	12	40	53	−13
UEFA Europa League	49	18	9	22	67	80	–13
UEFA Conference League	32	10	7	15	36	50	–14
Total	116	40	27	49	143	183	–40

Season	Competition	Round	Opponent	Home	Away	Aggregate
2013–14	UEFA Europa League	1QR	(Bulgaria) Botev Plovdiv	0–1	0–5	0–6
2014–15	UEFA Europa League	1QR	(Armenia) Pyunik	2–0	4–1	6–1
2014–15	UEFA Europa League	2QR	(Israel) Hapoel Tel Aviv	3–0	0–1	3–1
2014–15	UEFA Europa League	3QR	(Sweden) AIK	1–1	3–0	4–1
2014–15	UEFA Europa League	PO	(Spain) Villarreal	0–3	0–4	0–7
2015–16	UEFA Champions League	2QR	(Slovenia) Maribor	3–1	0–1	3–2
2015–16	UEFA Champions League	3QR	(Finland) HJK	4–3	0–0	4–3
2015–16	UEFA Champions League	PO	(Cyprus) APOEL	1–0	1–1	2–1
2015–16	UEFA Champions League	GS	(Portugal) Benfica	2–2	0–2	4th
2015–16	UEFA Champions League	GS	(Spain) Atlético Madrid	0–0	0–4	4th
2015–16	UEFA Champions League	GS	(Turkey) Galatasaray	2–2	1–1	4th
2016–17	UEFA Champions League	2QR	(Lithuania) Žalgiris	2–1	0–0	2–1
2016–17	UEFA Champions League	3QR	(Scotland) Celtic	1–1	1–2	2–3
2016–17	UEFA Europa League	PO	(Belarus) BATE Borisov	2–0	2–2	4–2
2016–17	UEFA Europa League	GS	(Greece) Olympiacos	1–1	1–4	4th
2016–17	UEFA Europa League	GS	(Cyprus) APOEL	2–1	1–2	4th
2016–17	UEFA Europa League	GS	(Switzerland) Young Boys	0–0	0–3	4th
2017–18	UEFA Champions League	2QR	(Latvia) Spartaks Jūrmala	1–1	1–0	2–1
2017–18	UEFA Champions League	3QR	(Poland) Legia Warsaw	3–1	0–1	3–2
2017–18	UEFA Champions League	PO	(Scotland) Celtic	4–3	0–5	4–8
2017–18	UEFA Europa League	GS	(Israel) Maccabi Tel Aviv	4–0	1–0	2nd
2017–18	UEFA Europa League	GS	(Czech Republic) Slavia Prague	1–1	1–0	2nd
2017–18	UEFA Europa League	GS	(Spain) Villarreal	2–3	1–3	2nd
2017–18	UEFA Europa League	R32	(Portugal) Sporting CP	1–3	3–3	4–6
2018–19	UEFA Champions League	1QR	(Montenegro) Sutjeska Nikšić	1–0	2–0	3–0
2018–19	UEFA Champions League	2QR	(Denmark) Midtjylland	2–1	0–0	2–1
2018–19	UEFA Champions League	3QR	(Croatia) Dinamo Zagreb	0–2	0–1	0–3
2018–19	UEFA Europa League	PO	(Cyprus) APOEL	1–0 (a.e.t.)	0–1	1–1 P.
2018–19	UEFA Europa League	GS	(Ukraine) Dynamo Kyiv	0–1	2–2	3rd
2018–19	UEFA Europa League	GS	(France) Rennes	2–0	0–2	3rd
2018–19	UEFA Europa League	GS	(Czech Republic) Jablonec	2–1	1–1	3rd
2019–20	UEFA Champions League	1QR	(Romania) CFR Cluj	1–0	1–3	2–3
2019–20	UEFA Europa League	2QR	(Andorra) Santa Coloma	4–1	0–0	4–1
2019–20	UEFA Europa League	3QR	(Malta) Valletta	5–1	4–0	9–1
2019–20	UEFA Europa League	PO	(Belarus) BATE Borisov	3–0	0–2	3–2
2019–20	UEFA Europa League	GS	(England) Manchester United	2–1	0–1	4th
2019–20	UEFA Europa League	GS	(Serbia) Partizan	1–2	1–4	4th
2019–20	UEFA Europa League	GS	(Netherlands) AZ	0–5	0–6	4th
2020–21	UEFA Champions League	1QR	(Belarus) Dynamo Brest	—N/a	3–6	—N/a
2020–21	UEFA Europa League	2QR	(Montenegro) Budućnost Podgorica	0–1	—N/a	—N/a
2021–22	UEFA Europa Conference League	2QR	(Greece) Aris	2–0	1–2 (a.e.t.)	3–2
2021–22	UEFA Europa Conference League	3QR	(Finland) KuPS	3–4	1–1	4–5
2022–23	UEFA Europa Conference League	2QR	(Poland) Raków Częstochowa	0–1	0–5	0–6
2023–24	UEFA Champions League	1QR	(Georgia (country)) Dinamo Tbilisi	1–1	2–1	3–2
2023–24	UEFA Champions League	2QR	(Croatia) Dinamo Zagreb	0–2	0–4	0–6
2023–24	UEFA Europa League	3QR	(Bulgaria) Ludogorets Razgrad	2–1	1–5	3–6
2023–24	UEFA Europa Conference League	PO	(Albania) Partizani	1–0	1–1	2–1
2023–24	UEFA Europa Conference League	GS	(Croatia) Dinamo Zagreb	0–2	1–5	3rd
2023–24	UEFA Europa Conference League	GS	(Czech Republic) Viktoria Plzeň	1–2	0–3	3rd
2023–24	UEFA Europa Conference League	GS	(Kosovo) Ballkani	0–0	2–1	3rd
2024–25	UEFA Conference League	2QR	(Moldova) Milsami Orhei	1–0	1–1	2–1
2024–25	UEFA Conference League	3QR	(Romania) Corvinul Hunedoara	6–1	2–1	8–2
2024–25	UEFA Conference League	PO	(Norway) Brann	3–0	0–2	3–2
2024–25	UEFA Conference League	LP	(Serbia) TSC	1–0	—N/a	28th
2024–25	UEFA Conference League	LP	(Wales) The New Saints	—N/a	0–2	28th
2024–25	UEFA Conference League	LP	(Cyprus) Pafos	—N/a	0–1	28th
2024–25	UEFA Conference League	LP	(Portugal) Vitória de Guimarães	1–1	—N/a	28th
2024–25	UEFA Conference League	LP	(England) Chelsea	1–3	—N/a	28th
2024–25	UEFA Conference League	LP	(Cyprus) APOEL	—N/a	1–1	28th
2025–26	UEFA Conference League	2QR	(Moldova) Zimbru Chișinău	1–1	2–0	3–1
2025–26	UEFA Conference League	3QR	(Switzerland) Lausanne-Sport	0–2	1–3	1–5
2026–27	UEFA Conference League	1QR	(Albania) Dinamo City	1–4 (a.e.t.)	1–0	2–4 (a.e.t.)
2027–28	UEFA Conference League	1QR				

Key

1QR = First qualifying round; 2QR = Second qualifying round; 3QR = Third qualifying round; PO = Play-off round; GS = Group stage; LP = League phase; R32 = Round of 32.

=== UEFA coefficient ===
Correct as of 21 May 2025.

Rank	Team	Points
132	(Portugal) Paços de Ferreira	12.453
133	(Portugal) Rio Ave	12.453
134	(Kazakhstan) Astana	12.000
135	(Croatia) Rijeka	12.000
136	(Lithuania) Žalgiris	12.000

== Player history ==
=== Most appearances ===
As of match played 31 October 2026

Players played over 50 competitive, professional matches only. Appearances as substitute (goals in parentheses) included in total.

	Name	Years	League	Cup	League Cup	Super Cup	Europe	Total
1	(Kazakhstan) Abzal Beisebekov	2009, 2012–present	341 (15)	38 (1)	4 (0)	10 (0)	79 (4)	472 (20)
2	(Croatia) Marin Tomasov	2017, 2018–Present	236 (106)	13 (3)	4 (1)	6 (3)	69 (20)	328 (133)
3	(Kazakhstan) Nenad Erić	2011–2020	227 (0)	16 (0)	0 (0)	7 (0)	68 (0)	318 (0)
4	(Kazakhstan) Dmitry Shomko	2011, 2014–2020, 2025–Present	219 (8)	10 (0)	0 (0)	7 (0)	70 (5)	306 (13)
5	(Kazakhstan) Yevgeny Postnikov	2014–2021	149 (2)	10 (0)	0 (0)	6 (0)	58 (3)	223 (5)
6	(Bosnia and Herzegovina) Marin Aničić	2014–2019	148 (5)	7 (0)	0 (0)	5 (0)	52 (6)	212 (11)
7	(Kazakhstan) Tanat Nusserbayev	2011–2016	152 (46)	18 (5)	0 (0)	3 (0)	24 (3)	197 (54)
8	(Kazakhstan) Serikzhan Muzhikov	2014, 2015–2019	122 (16)	10 (1)	0 (0)	3 (0)	54 (2)	189 (19)
9	(Belarus) Max Ebong	2020–2025	126 (10)	13 (1)	3 (0)	4 (0)	32 (0)	178 (11)
10	(Ghana) Patrick Twumasi	2013, 2014, 2015–2018	123 (48)	9 (6)	0 (0)	4 (0)	35 (15)	171 (69)

=== Top goalscorers ===
As of match played 31 October 2026
Competitive, professional matches only, appearances including substitutes appear in brackets.

	Name	Years	League	Cup	League Cup	Super Cup	Europe	Total	Ratio
1	(Croatia) Marin Tomasov	2017, 2018–Present	106 (236)	3 (13)	1 (4)	3 (6)	20 (69)	133 (328)	0.41
2	(Ghana) Patrick Twumasi	2013, 2014, 2015–2018	48 (123)	6 (9)	0 (0)	0 (4)	15 (35)	69 (171)	0.4
2	(Kazakhstan) Tanat Nusserbayev	2011–2016	46 (152)	5 (18)	0 (0)	0 (3)	3 (24)	54 (197)	0.27
4	(Democratic Republic of the Congo) Junior Kabananga	2015–2018, 2018–2019	31 (77)	3 (5)	0 (0)	2 (2)	6 (44)	42 (128)	0.33
5	(Central African Republic) Foxi Kéthévoama	2012, 2013–2015	26 (109)	5 (13)	0 (0)	1 (2)	2 (22)	34 (146)	0.23
6	(Kazakhstan) Roman Murtazayev	2017–2019, 2021	25 (110)	0 (3)	0 (0)	0 (4)	5 (36)	30 (152)	0.2
7	(Kazakhstan) Abat Aymbetov	2021–2024	23 (58)	4 (14)	0 (0)	0 (1)	2 (18)	29 (91)	0.32
8	(Nigeria) Geoffrey Chinedu	2024–2026	18 (36)	0 (1)	3 (3)	0 (0)	6 (14)	27 (54)	0.5
9	(Moldova) Igor Bugaiov	2010–2011	18 (57)	6 (6)	0 (0)	2 (1)	(-)	26 (64)	0.41
10	(Albania) Nazmi Gripshi	2024–2026	22 (38)	0 (0)	1 (2)	0 (0)	2 (13)	25 (53)	0.47

=== Clean sheets ===
As of match played 31 October 2026
Competitive, professional matches only, appearances including substitutes appear in brackets.

	Name	Years	League	Cup	League Cup	Super Cup	Europe	Total	Ratio
1	(Kazakhstan) Nenad Erić	2011–2020	96 (227)	7 (16)	(-)	5 (7)	21 (68)	129 (318)	0.41
2	(Croatia) Josip Čondrić	2023–Present	24 (57)	0 (3)	1 (3)	0 (1)	7 (27)	32 (91)	0.35
3	(Kazakhstan) Aleksandr Mokin	2016-2019	24 (44)	2 (6)	(-)	0 (0)	1 (7)	27 (57)	0.47
4	(Kazakhstan) Aleksandr Zarutskiy	2021–2024	11 (33)	8 (16)	0 (0)	0 (2)	0 (3)	19 (54)	0.35
5	(Kazakhstan) Mukhammedzhan Seysen	2024–Present	11 (34)	0 (2)	3 (3)	0 (0)	1 (5)	15 (44)	0.34
6	(Russia) Roman Gerus	2010	12 (23)	1 (1)	(-)	(-)	(-)	13 (24)	0.54
7	(Kazakhstan) Dmytro Nepohodov	2019-2021	10 (24)	0 (3)	(-)	1 (2)	1 (5)	12 (34)	0.35
8	(Russia) Aleksei Belkin	2010-2012	5 (14)	4 (4)	(-)	0 (1)	(-)	9 (19)	0.47
8	(Kazakhstan) Vladimir Loginovsky	2013-2015	8 (20)	1 (4)	(-)	0 (0)	0 (3)	9 (27)	0.33
10	(Kazakhstan) Roman Nesterenko	2009	6 (15)	1 (3)	(-)	(-)	(-)	7 (18)	0.39

== Partnerships ==
- (Spain) Real Sociedad (2013–present)

On 11 November 2013 it was announced that Astana had partnered with the La Liga team Real Sociedad to cooperate in terms of exchange of skills and knowledge, organization of friendly matches, training camps for youth development and grassroots football.

- (Turkey) Galatasaray S.K. (2014–present)

On 29 April 2014 it was announced that Astana Presidential Club had signed a memorandum of cooperation with the Galatasaray Sports Club. The memorandum chiefly provides for cooperation between the Astana and Galatasaray S.K. football departments.
