= Stanislav Basmanov =

Kazakhstani footballer (born 2001)

Personal information
- Full name: Stanislav Igorevich Basmanov
- Date of birth: 24 June 2001 (age 25)
- Place of birth: Astana, Kazakhstan
- Height: 1.77 m (5 ft 10 in)
- Position: Forward

Team information
- Current team: Astana
- Number: 72

Youth career
- Astana

Senior career*
Years	Team	Apps	(Gls)
2018–	Astana	93	(13)

International career^{‡}
2017	Kazakhstan U17	8	(1)
2018–2020	Kazakhstan U21	3	(0)
2026–	Kazakhstan	3	(0)
- * Club domestic league appearances and goals as of 1 November 2026 ‡ National team caps and goals as of 8 October 2026

Stanislav Igorevich Basmanov (born 24 June 2001) is a Kazakhstani footballer who plays as a forward for Astana and the Kazakhstan national team.

== Career ==
=== Club ===
On 30 December 2021, Astana announced that they had signed a new contract with Basmanov.

On 17 January 2023, Basmanov again extended his contract with Astana.

=== International ===
Basmanov made his international debut for Kazakhstan on 26 September 2026, in a 2026–27 UEFA Nations League match against Faroe Islands, which finished as a 1–1 draw at Tórsvøllur in the Faroe Islands.

== Career statistics ==
=== Club ===
As of match played 15 July 2025

Appearances and goals by club, season and competition
Club	Season	League			National cup (Note: Includes Kazakhstan Cup)		League cup (Note: Includes Kazakhstan League Cup)		Continental		Other		Total	
Club	Season	Division	Apps	Goals	Apps	Goals	Apps	Goals	Apps	Goals	Apps	Goals	Apps	Goals
Astana	2018	Premier League	1	0	0	0	—		0 (Note: Zero appearances in the UEFA Champions League and zero appearances in the UEFA Europa League)	0	0 (Note: Appearance in Kazakhstan Super Cup)	0	1	0
Astana	2019	Premier League	0	0	0	0	—		0 (Note: Zero appearances in the UEFA Champions League and zero appearances in the UEFA Europa League)	0	0	0	0	0
Astana	2020	Premier League	1	0	0	0	—		0 (Note: Zero appearances in the UEFA Champions League and zero appearances in the UEFA Europa League)	0	0	0	1	0
Astana	2021	Premier League	5	0	7	0	—		0 (Note: Appearances in the UEFA Conference League)	0	0	0	12	0
Astana	2022	Premier League	19	3	7	1	—		2	0	—		28	4
Astana	2023	Premier League	14	0	5	0	—		1 (Note: Zero appearances in the UEFA Champions League, zero appearances in the UEFA Europa League, one appearance in the UEFA Europa Conference League)	0	0	0	20	0
Astana	2024	Premier League	12	1	2	0	4	1	2	0	—		20	2
Astana	2025	Premier League	15	2	2	0	—		1	0	—		18	2
Astana	2026	Premier League	22	6	0	0	—		2	0	—		24	6
Astana	Total		89	12	23	1	4	1	8	0	0	0	124	14
Career total			89	12	23	1	4	1	8	0	0	0	124	14

=== International ===
As of match played 6 October 2026

Kazakhstan
Year	Apps	Goals
2026	3	0
Total	3	0
