= Ivan Bašić =

Bosnian footballer (born 2002)

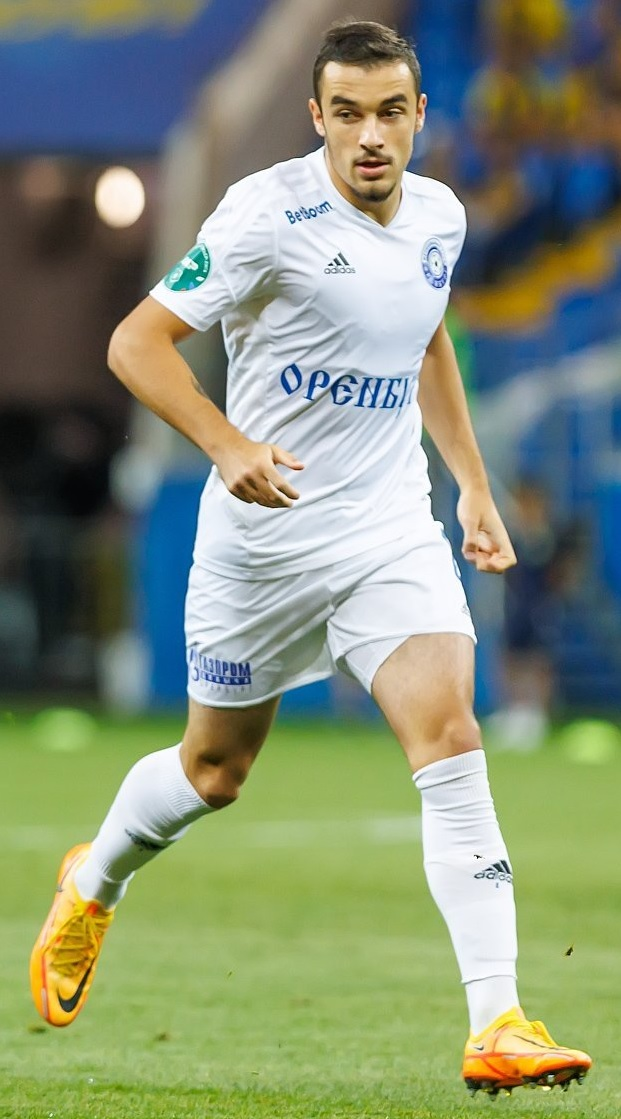
- Bašić playing for Orenburg in 2022

Personal information
- Date of birth: 30 April 2002 (age 24)
- Place of birth: Imotski, Croatia
- Height: 1.78 m (5 ft 10 in)
- Position: Midfielder

Team information
- Current team: Astana
- Number: 8

Youth career
- Posušje
- 2018–2020: Zrinjski Mostar

Senior career*
Years	Team	Apps	(Gls)
2020–2022	Zrinjski Mostar	42	(7)
2022–2025	Orenburg	71	(4)
2025–	Astana	33	(4)

International career^{‡}
2019–2021	Bosnia and Herzegovina U19	9	(2)
2021–2023	Bosnia and Herzegovina U21	19	(5)
2023–	Bosnia and Herzegovina	26	(1)
- * Club domestic league appearances and goals as of 31 October 2026 ‡ National team caps and goals as of 17 November 2026

Ivan Bašić (pronounced [ǐʋan bǎʃitɕ]; born 30 April 2002) is a professional footballer who plays as a midfielder for Kazakhstan Premier League club Astana. Born in Croatia, he plays for the Bosnia and Herzegovina national team.

Bašić started his professional career at Zrinjski Mostar, before joining Orenburg in 2022. Three years later, he signed with Astana.

A former youth international for Bosnia and Herzegovina, Bašić made his senior international debut in 2023, earning over 20 caps since. He represented the nation at the 2026 FIFA World Cup.

== Club career ==
=== Early career ===
Bašić started playing football at Posušje, before joining Zrinjski Mostar's youth academy in 2018. He made his professional debut against Sloboda Tuzla on 22 August 2020 at the age of 18. On 16 May 2021, he scored his first professional goal in a triumph over Krupa.

=== Orenburg ===
In June 2022, Bašić was transferred to Russian side Orenburg for an undisclosed fee. He made his official debut for the team on 16 July against Krylia Sovetov. On 31 July, he scored his first goal for Orenburg against Spartak Moscow.

=== Astana ===
In July 2025, Bašić moved to Kazakh outfit Astana on a contract until December 2027. He made his competitive debut for the squad against Zhetysu on 6 July. On 24 July, he scored his first goal for Astana in a UEFA Conference League qualifier against Zimbru Chișinău. Seven months later, he scored his first league goal in a defeat of Tobol.

== International career ==
Bašić represented Bosnia and Herzegovina at various youth levels. He also served as a captain of the under-21 team under coach Igor Janković.

In September 2023, he received his first senior call up, for UEFA Euro 2024 qualifiers against Liechtenstein and Portugal, but had to wait until 19 November to make his debut against Slovakia.

In June 2026, Bašić was named in Bosnia and Herzegovina's squad for the 2026 FIFA World Cup. He made his tournament debut in the opening group game against Canada on 12 June.

On 5 October, in a 2026–27 UEFA Nations League B match against Poland, Bašić scored his first senior international goal, which secured the victory for his side.

== Career statistics ==
=== Club ===
As of match played 31 October 2026

Appearances and goals by club, season and competition
Club	Season	League			National cup (Note: Includes Bosnian Cup, Russian Cup)		Continental		Total	
Club	Season	Division	Apps	Goals	Apps	Goals	Apps	Goals	Apps	Goals
Zrinjski Mostar	2020–21	Bosnian Premier League	13	2	1	0	1 (Note: Appearance in UEFA Europa League)	0	15	2
Zrinjski Mostar	2021–22	Bosnian Premier League	29	5	2	0	–		31	5
Zrinjski Mostar	Total		42	7	3	0	1	0	46	7
Orenburg	2022–23	Russian Premier League	15	2	2	0	–		17	2
Orenburg	2023–24	Russian Premier League	29	1	8	0	–		37	1
Orenburg	2024–25	Russian Premier League	27	1	5	0	–		32	1
Orenburg	Total		71	4	15	0	–		86	4
Astana	2025	Kazakhstan Premier League	11	0	–		4 (Note: Appearances in UEFA Conference League)	2	15	2
Astana	2026	Kazakhstan Premier League	22	4	0	0	2	0	24	4
Astana	Total		33	4	0	0	6	2	39	6
Career total			146	15	18	0	7	2	171	17

=== International ===
As of match played 17 November 2026

Appearances and goals by national team and year
National team	Year	Apps	Goals
Bosnia and Herzegovina
Bosnia and Herzegovina	2023	1	0
Bosnia and Herzegovina	2024	5	0
Bosnia and Herzegovina	2025	7	0
Bosnia and Herzegovina	2026	13	1
Total		26	1

Scores and results list Bosnia and Herzegovina's goal tally first, score column indicates score after each Bašić goal.

List of international goals scored by Ivan Bašić
No.	Date	Venue	Cap	Opponent	Score	Result	Competition
1	5 October 2026	Bilino Polje, Zenica, Bosnia and Herzegovina	24	Poland	1–0	1–0	2026–27 UEFA Nations League B

== Honours ==
Zrinjski Mostar

- Bosnian Premier League: 2021–22
