= Nikola Burić =

Croatian footballer (born 1996)

Personal information
- Date of birth: 1 October 1996 (age 30)
- Place of birth: Zagreb, Croatia
- Height: 1.88 m (6 ft 2 in)
- Position: Forward

Team information
- Current team: Astana
- Number: 29

Youth career
- 2004–2010: Pregrada
- 2010–2015: Dinamo Zagreb

Senior career*
Years	Team	Apps	(Gls)
2015–2017	Dinamo Zagreb II	4	(0)
2017–2018	Rudeš	0	(0)
2017	→ Novigrad (loan)	15	(0)
2018	→ Kustošija (loan)	10	(0)
2018–2020	Lokomotiva Zagreb	2	(1)
2019–2020	→ Rudeš (loan)	10	(2)
2020–2021	Rudeš	16	(7)
2021–2022	Legnago	48	(9)
2022–2023	Novara	18	(1)
2023–2024	Legnago	23	(0)
2024–2025	Koper	8	(0)
2025	Domžale	14	(3)
2025–2026	Egnatia	33	(6)
2026–	Astana	12	(1)
- * Club domestic league appearances and goals as of 1 November 2026

Nikola Burić (born 1 October 1996) is a Croatian professional footballer who plays as a forward for Kazakh club Astana.

== Club career ==
A product of his local club Pregrada, Burić moved to the Dinamo Zagreb Academy at the age of 13. He made his debut for the Dinamo Zagreb reserves on 7 October 2016 in a match against Gorica.

On 1 February 2021, Burić joined Italian Serie C club Legnago. On 9 July 2022, he moved to Novara.

On 31 August 2023, Burić returned to Legnago on a one-year contract.

On 20 July 2026, Kazakhstan Premier League club Astana announced the signing of Burić from Egnatia Rrogozhinë.
