= Branimir Kalaica =

Croatian professional footballer (born 1998)

Personal information
- Date of birth: 1 June 1998 (age 28)
- Place of birth: Zagreb, Croatia
- Height: 1.90 m (6 ft 3 in)
- Position: Centre back

Team information
- Current team: Astana
- Number: 3

Youth career
- 2011–2016: Dinamo Zagreb

Senior career*
Years	Team	Apps	(Gls)
2016–2022	Benfica B	100	(3)
2017–2022	Benfica	1	(1)
2023–2024	Lokomotiva Zagreb	41	(1)
2024–	Astana	56	(4)

International career^{‡}
2012	Croatia U14	2	(0)
2013	Croatia U15	7	(1)
2014	Croatia U16	6	(1)
2013–2015	Croatia U17	20	(0)
2014–2015	Croatia U18	5	(1)
2014–2017	Croatia U19	12	(1)
2018–2019	Croatia U20	5	(0)
2019	Croatia U21	9	(1)
2023	Croatia U23	1	(0)
- * Club domestic league appearances and goals as of 1 November 2026 ‡ National team caps and goals as of 9 June 2023

Branimir Kalaica (born 1 June 1998) is a Croatian professional footballer who plays as a centre-back for Astana in Kazakhstan Premier League.

== Club career ==
Born in Zagreb, Kalaica started his football career at local club Dinamo Zagreb. In June 2016, he moved to Portugal and signed a six-year contract with defending champions Benfica, as a free agent. On 11 September, he debuted for Benfica's reserve team in a 2–1 home win against Académico de Viseu in LigaPro.

== Honours ==
Benfica

- Primeira Liga: 2016–17
- Supertaça Cândido de Oliveira: 2016
- UEFA Youth League runner-up: 2016–17
