= Mukhammedzhan Seysen =

Kazakhstani footballer

Personal information
- Full name: Mukhammedzhan Muratuly Seysen
- Date of birth: 14 February 1999 (age 27)
- Place of birth: Taraz, Kazakhstan
- Height: 1.90 m (6 ft 3 in)
- Position: Goalkeeper

Team information
- Current team: Astana
- Number: 74

Youth career
- –2016: Taraz

Senior career*
Years	Team	Apps	(Gls)
2017–2019	Taraz-2	23	(0)
2018–2023	Taraz	74	(0)
2023	Ordabasy	11	(0)
2024–	Astana	34	(0)

International career^{‡}
2018	Kazakhstan U20	1	(0)
2018–2020	Kazakhstan U21	9	(0)
2021–	Kazakhstan	7	(0)
- * Club domestic league appearances and goals as of 1 November 2026 ‡ National team caps and goals as of 25 March 2026

Mukhammedzhan Muratuly Seysen (Kazakh: Мұхаммеджан Мұратұлы Сейсен, Mūhammedjan Mūratūly Seisen; born 14 February 1999) is a Kazakhstani footballer who plays as a goalkeeper for Astana.

== Club career ==
Seysen made his professional debut for Taraz in the Kazakhstan Premier League on 15 March 2019, starting in the 1–4 away loss against Tobol.

== International career ==
He made his debut for Kazakhstan national football team on 4 June 2021 in a friendly against North Macedonia.
