= Grigory Babayan =

Kazahkstani footballer and manager

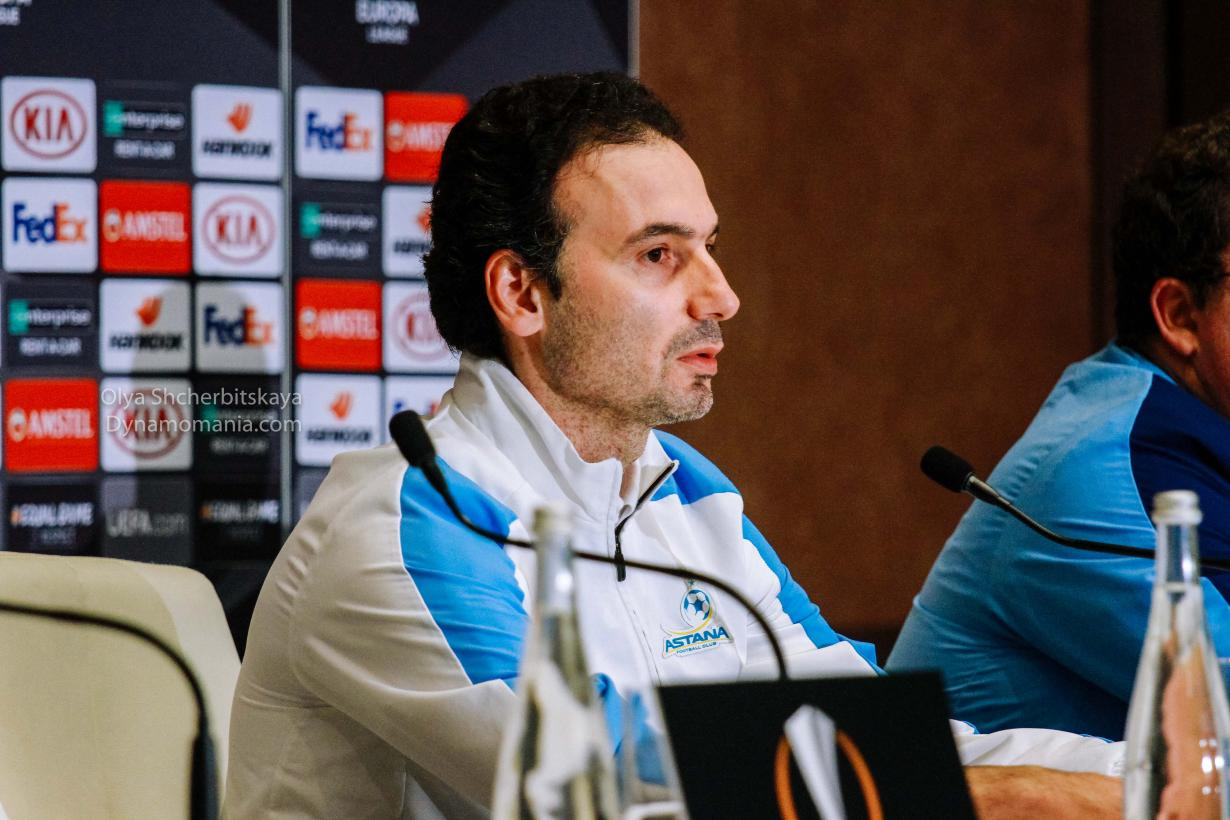
- Babayan with Astana in 2018

Personal information
- Full name: Grigory Konstantinovich Babayan
- Date of birth: 2 April 1980 (age 46)
- Place of birth: Alma-Ata, Kazakh SSR, Soviet Union
- Position: Midfielder

Senior career*
Years	Team	Apps	(Gls)
2002	Kairat		
2003–2005	Alma-Ata		

Managerial career
- 2013: Astana (caretaker)
- 2014: Astana (caretaker)
- 2018: Astana (caretaker)
- 2018: Astana (caretaker)
- 2019–2021: Tobol
- 2021–2022: CSKA Moscow (assistant)
- 2022–: Astana
- * Club domestic league appearances and goals

Grigory Konstantinovich Babayan (Russian: Григорий Константинович Бабаян; Armenian: Գրիգորի Բաբայան; born 2 April 1980) is a Kazakh football manager and a former player who is head coach of FC Astana.

== Playing career ==
During his senior career Babayan played as a midfielder for Kairat and Alma-Ata.

== Managerial career ==
In 2012, Babayan joined Astana as a coach, serving as caretaker manager on several occasions. On 14 December 2019, Babayan was appointed as manager of FC Tobol.

On 17 June 2021, Babayan was appointed by CSKA Moscow as a member of their coaching staff. On 15 June 2022, he left CSKA by mutual consent.

On 13 September 2022, Babayan was appointed head coach of Astana following the departure of Srđan Blagojević.

== Managerial statistics ==
As of match played 26 October 2025

Team	Nat	From	To	Record				
Team	Nat	From	To	G	W	D	L	Win %
Astana (caretaker)	(Kazakhstan)	13 July 2013	21 July 2013	1	1	0	0	100.00
Astana (caretaker)	(Kazakhstan)	1 January 2014	21 June 2014	16	7	6	3	43.75
Astana (caretaker)	(Kazakhstan)	2 March 2018	31 May 2018	16	13	1	2	81.25
Tobol	(Kazakhstan)	14 December 2019	16 June 2021	37	21	9	7	56.76
Astana	(Kazakhstan)	13 September 2022	Present	131	73	25	33	55.73
Total				201	115	41	45	57.21
