= Kipras Kažukolovas =

Lithuanian footballer (born 2000)

Personal information
- Full name: Kipras Kažukolovas
- Date of birth: 20 November 2000 (age 25)
- Place of birth: Kuršėnai, Lithuania
- Height: 1.91 m (6 ft 3 in)
- Position: Defender

Team information
- Current team: Astana
- Number: 5

Youth career
- 2017–2021: Brighton

Senior career*
Years	Team	Apps	(Gls)
2021–2023	Žalgiris	49	(4)
2024–	Astana	55	(1)

International career^{‡}
2023–	Lithuania	22	(0)
- * Club domestic league appearances and goals as of 1 November 2026 ‡ National team caps and goals as of 18 November 2026

Kipras Kažukolovas (born 20 November 2000) is a Lithuanian footballer who plays as a defender for Kazakhstani club Astana.

== Early life ==
Kažukolovas was born on 20 November 2000 in Kuršėnai, Lithuania. A native of Kuršėnai, Lithuania, he played tennis and basketball as a child.

== Club career ==
Kažukolovas joined the youth academy of English side Brighton at the age of sixteen. While playing for the club, he suffered an injury before returning to Lithuania, where he played for amateur side Katastrofa. Altogether, he made seven appearances and scored four goals for the club.

In 2021, he signed for Lithuanian side Žalgiris, where he helped the club win the league title and the 2022 Lithuanian Football Cup and played in the UEFA Conference League. Three years later, he signed for Kazakhstani side Astana, helping the club win the 2024 Kazakhstan League Cup.

== Style of play ==
Kažukolovas plays as a defender. Right-footed, he can also play as a midfielder. As a child, he played as a forward before switching to defender.
