= Ramazan Karimov =

Kazakhstani footballer (born 1999)

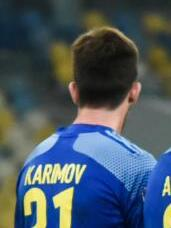
- Karimov with Kazakhstan in 2021

Personal information
- Full name: Ramazan Yerikovich Karimov
- Date of birth: 5 July 1999 (age 27)
- Place of birth: Astana, Kazakhstan
- Height: 1.90 m (6 ft 3 in)
- Position: Forward

Team information
- Current team: Astana
- Number: 81

Youth career
- Astana

Senior career*
Years	Team	Apps	(Gls)
2017–2019	Astana U21	81	(45)
2018–2022	Astana	4	(1)
2020	→ Caspiy (loan)	2	(0)
2021	→ Caspiy	18	(3)
2022–2024	Maktaaral	46	(15)
2024–	Astana	75	(10)

International career^{‡}
2017	Kazakhstan U19	1	(4)
2018–2020	Kazakhstan U21	14	(2)
2021–	Kazakhstan	8	(1)
- * Club domestic league appearances and goals as of 1 November 2026 ‡ National team caps and goals as of 8 October 2026

Ramazan Yerikovich Karimov (Kazakh: Рамазан Ерикович Каримов; born 5 July 1999) is a Kazakhstani footballer who plays as a forward for Astana and the Kazakhstan national team.

== Career ==
=== Club ===
On 18 January 2024, Karimov re-signed for Astana on a one-year contract from Maktaaral.

=== International ===
Karimov made his international debut for Kazakhstan on 28 March 2021 in a 2022 FIFA World Cup qualification match against France, which finished as a 0–2 home loss at Astana Arena.

== Career statistics ==
=== International ===
As of 5 October 2026

Kazakhstan
Year	Apps	Goals
2021	2	0
2024	2	0
2025	1	0
2026	3	1
Total	8	1

Scores and results list Kazakhstan's goal tally first, score column indicates score after each Karimov goal.

List of international goals scored by Ramazan Karimov
No.	Date	Venue	Cap	Opponent	Score	Result	Competition
1	29 September 2026	Košická futbalová aréna, Košice, Slovakia	6	Slovakia	1–1	1–2	2026–27 UEFA Nations League C
