= 2015 Kazakhstan Super Cup =

Astana	Kairat
0	0
- Astana won 3–2 on penalties
- Date: 1 March
- Venue: Astana Arena, Astana
- Referee: Jonas Eriksson (Sweden)
- Attendance: 20,000

2015 Kazakhstan Super Cup was a Kazakhstan football match that was played on 1 March 2015 between the champions of 2014 Kazakhstan Premier League, Astana, and the winner of the 2014 Kazakhstan Cup, Kairat.

This match was played on 1 March at the Astana Arena. Main and extra time of the match ended with goalless draw, and Astana won the 2015 Kazakhstan Super Cup by a penalty shootout (3:2).

== Match details ==
1 March 2015
15:30 UTC+06:00

Astana	0 – 0	Kairat
	Report
Penalties
Shomko (penalty missed); Aničić (penalty scored); Cañas (penalty scored); Konysbayev (penalty missed); Kéthévoama (penalty missed); Beisebekov (penalty scored)	3–2	(penalty missed) Darabayev; (penalty missed) Marković; (penalty scored) Riera; (penalty missed) Pliyev; (penalty scored) Rudoselskiy; (penalty missed) Kalinin

Astana Arena, Astana
Attendance: 20,000
Referee: Jonas Eriksson (Sweden)

Astana	Kairat

GK	1	(Kazakhstan) Nenad Erić
RB	15	(Kazakhstan) Abzal Beisebekov (c)
CB	5	(Bosnia and Herzegovina) Marin Aničić	(yellow card) 88'
CB	44	(Kazakhstan) Evgeni Postnikov
CB	6	(Serbia) Nemanja Maksimović
LB	77	(Kazakhstan) Dmitri Shomko
DM	88	(Colombia) Roger Cañas
CM	19	(Kazakhstan) Alexei Rodionov		(substituted off) 72'
LW	10	(Central African Republic) Foxi Kéthévoama
RW	22	(Kazakhstan) Bauyrzhan Dzholchiev		(substituted off) 72'
CF	23	(Ghana) Patrick Twumasi		(substituted off) 100'
Substitutes:
GK	85	(Kazakhstan) Vladimir Loginovskiy
DF	4	(Denmark) Kasper Larsen
DF	2	(Kazakhstan) Yeldos Akhmetov
MF	8	(Kazakhstan) Georgy Zhukov		(substituted in) 63'
MF	7	(Kazakhstan) Ulan Konysbayev	(yellow card) 88'	(substituted in) 72'
FW	9	(Kazakhstan) Aleksey Shchetkin		(substituted in) 100'
FW	21	(Kazakhstan) Toktar Zhangylyshbay
Manager:
(Bulgaria) Stanimir Stoilov

GK	1	(Kazakhstan) Vladimir Plotnikov
RB	13	(Kazakhstan) Yermek Kuantayev
CB	2	(Kazakhstan) Timur Rudoselskiy
CB	6	(Serbia) Žarko Marković
CB	3	(Kazakhstan) Zaurbek Pliyev
LB	5	(Kazakhstan) Mark Gurman
DM	8	(Kazakhstan) Mikhail Bakayev
RW	9	(Kazakhstan) Bauyrzhan Islamkhan (c)	(substituted off) 96'
AM	10	(Brazil) Isael	(substituted off) 79'
LW	15	(Spain) Sito Riera
CF	11	(Ivory Coast) Gerard Gohou	(substituted off) 79'
Substitutes:
GK	16	(Kazakhstan) Serhiy Tkachuk
MF	25	(Kazakhstan) Oybek Baltabayev
MF	17	(Kazakhstan) Aslan Darabayev	(substituted in) 79'
MF	23	(Kazakhstan) Ilya Kalinin	(substituted in) 96'
MF	18	(Kazakhstan) Vitali Lee
MF	19	(Kazakhstan) Stanislav Lunin
FW	21	(The Gambia) Momodou Ceesay	(substituted in) 79'
Manager:
(Slovakia) Vladimír Weiss

== See also ==
- 2014 Kazakhstan Premier League
- 2014 Kazakhstan Cup
