= 2017 FC Astana season =

FC Astana
2017 season
- Chairman: Sayan Khamitzhanov
- Manager: Stanimir Stoilov
- Stadium: Astana Arena
- Premier League: 1st
- Kazakhstan Cup: Last 16 vs Zhetysu
- Champions League: Play-off round vs Celtic
- Europa League: Group Stage
- Super Cup: Runners-up
- Top goalscorer: League: Junior Kabananga (19); All: Junior Kabananga (22)
Home colours	Away colours	Third colours

The 2017 FC Astana season is the ninth successive season that the club will play in the Kazakhstan Premier League, the highest tier of association football in Kazakhstan. Astana are defending Kazakhstan Premier League Champions, having been crowned Champions for the third time the previous season, and the defending Kazakhstan Cup champions. Astana will also enter the Champions League, entering at the Second Qualifying Stage.

== Squad ==
As of match played 7 December 2017

No.	Name	Nationality	Position	Date of birth (age)	Signed from	Signed in	Apps.	Goals
Goalkeepers
1	Nenad Erić	(Kazakhstan)	GK	26 May 1982 (aged 35)	Kairat	2011	221	0
35	Aleksandr Mokin	(Kazakhstan)	GK	19 June 1981 (aged 36)	Shakhter Karagandy	2016	37	0
51	Danil Podymksy	(Kazakhstan)	GK	5 June 1998 (aged 19)	Academy	2016	0	0
85	Oleg Medvedev	(Kazakhstan)	GK	21 March 2000 (aged 17)	Academy	2016	0	0
90	Sayenko Vladislav	(Kazakhstan)	GK	4 June 2000 (aged 17)	Academy	2016	0	0
94	Abylaikhan Duysen	(Kazakhstan)	GK	3 June 1994 (aged 23)	Bayterek	2016	0	0
Defenders
4	Igor Shitov	(Belarus)	DF	24 October 1986 (aged 31)	Mordovia Saransk	2016	64	1
5	Marin Aničić	(Bosnia and Herzegovina)	DF	17 August 1989 (aged 28)	Zrinjski Mostar	2014	152	7
15	Abzal Beisebekov	(Kazakhstan)	DF	30 November 1992 (aged 25)	Vostok	2012	208	5
21	Berik Shaikhov	(Kazakhstan)	DF	20 February 1994 (aged 23)	Astana-1964	2015	7	0
25	Serhiy Malyi	(Kazakhstan)	DF	5 June 1990 (aged 27)	Irtysh Pavlodar	2016	23	1
27	Yuriy Logvinenko	(Kazakhstan)	DF	22 July 1988 (aged 29)	Aktobe	2016	79	8
33	Alim Ilyasov	(Kazakhstan)	DF	22 June 2000 (aged 17)	Academy	2016	0	0
44	Yevgeny Postnikov	(Russia)	DF	16 April 1986 (aged 31)	Shakhtyor Soligorsk	2014	127	2
49	Dauren Iskakov	(Kazakhstan)	DF	25 April 1999 (aged 18)	Academy	2017	0	0
57	Kashken Dinmuhammed	(Kazakhstan)	DF	4 January 2000 (aged 17)	Academy	2016	0	0
72	Sanzhar Aitym	(Kazakhstan)	DF	2 March 2000 (aged 17)	Academy	2016	0	0
74	Sagi Sovet	(Kazakhstan)	DF	15 March 2000 (aged 17)	Academy	2016	0	0
77	Dmitri Shomko	(Kazakhstan)	DF	19 March 1990 (aged 27)	Irtysh Pavlodar	2014	175	8
92	Danil Mikhailov	(Kazakhstan)	DF	29 February 2000 (aged 17)	Academy	2016	0	0
99	Talgat Kusyapov	(Kazakhstan)	DF	14 February 1999 (aged 18)	Academy	2016	1	0
Midfielders
6	László Kleinheisler	(Hungary)	MF	8 April 1994 (aged 23)	loan from Werder Bremen	2017	10	0
7	Serikzhan Muzhikov	(Kazakhstan)	MF	7 August 1989 (aged 28)	Kaisar	2015	131	12
8	Srđan Grahovac	(Bosnia and Herzegovina)	MF	19 September 1992 (aged 25)	loan from Rapid Wien	2017	36	8
14	Marin Tomasov	(Croatia)	MF	31 August 1987 (aged 30)	loan from Rijeka	2017	19	3
17	Askhat Tagybergen	(Kazakhstan)	MF	9 August 1990 (aged 27)	Aktobe	2016	49	6
18	Ivan Mayewski	(Belarus)	MF	5 May 1988 (aged 29)	Anzhi Makhachkala	2017	43	4
34	Sayan Mukanov	(Kazakhstan)	MF	6 January 1997 (aged 20)	Academy	2017	0	0
49	Nurdaulet Mamatov	(Kazakhstan)	MF	4 March 1998 (aged 19)	Academy	2017	0	0
61	Artem Tsoi	(Kazakhstan)	MF	10 February 2000 (aged 17)	Academy	2017	0	0
66	Ruslan Mahan	(Kazakhstan)	MF	7 January 2000 (aged 17)	Academy	2016	0	0
70	Sultan Sagnayev	(Kazakhstan)	MF	14 January 2000 (aged 17)	Academy	2016	2	0
71	Madi Zhakypbayev	(Kazakhstan)	MF	21 March 2000 (aged 17)	Academy	2016	6	0
78	Alisher Saginov	(Kazakhstan)	MF	20 January 1998 (aged 19)	Academy	2016	0	0
98	Zhaslan Kairkenov	(Kazakhstan)	MF	27 March 2000 (aged 17)	Academy	2016	0	0
	Daulet Zainetdinov	(Kazakhstan)	MF	15 May 1997 (aged 20)	Academy	2016	1	0
Forwards
9	Đorđe Despotović	(Serbia)	FW	4 March 1992 (aged 25)	Red Star Belgrade	2016	58	14
23	Patrick Twumasi	(Ghana)	FW	9 May 1994 (aged 23)	Spartaks Jūrmala	2015	153	60
30	Junior Kabananga	(Democratic Republic of the Congo)	FW	4 April 1989 (aged 28)	Cercle Brugge	2015	95	38
45	Roman Murtazayev	(Kazakhstan)	FW	10 September 1993 (aged 24)	Irtysh Pavlodar	2017	44	6
54	Viktor Pron	(Kazakhstan)	FW	23 September 1997 (aged 20)	Academy	2017	1	0
80	Vladislav Prokopenko	(Kazakhstan)	FW	1 July 2000 (aged 17)	Academy	2016	4	0
81	Ramazan Karimov	(Kazakhstan)	FW	5 July 1999 (aged 18)	Academy	2017	0	0
89	Lev Skvortsov	(Kazakhstan)	FW	2 February 2000 (aged 17)	Academy	2016	0	0
Players away on loan
10	Azdren Llullaku	(Albania)	FW	15 February 1988 (aged 29)	Gaz Metan Mediaș	2017	19	1
22	Gevorg Najaryan	(Kazakhstan)	MF	6 January 1998 (aged 19)	Shakhter Karagandy	2016	9	0
31	Abay Zhunussov	(Kazakhstan)	MF	15 March 1995 (aged 22)	Academy	2016	6	0
73	Didar Zhalmukan	(Kazakhstan)	MF	22 May 1996 (aged 21)	Aktobe	2017	19	3
99	Aleksey Shchotkin	(Kazakhstan)	FW	21 May 1991 (aged 26)	Taraz	2015	50	4
Players that left during the season

== Transfers ==
=== Winter ===
In: Note: Flags indicate national team as defined under FIFA eligibility rules; some limited exceptions apply. Players may hold more than one non-FIFA nationality.

No.	Pos.	Nation	Player
8	MF	BIH	Srđan Grahovac (loan from (Austria) Rapid Wien)
10	FW	ALB	Azdren Llullaku (from (Romania) Gaz Metan Mediaș)
18	MF	BLR	Ivan Mayewski (from (Russia) Anzhi Makhachkala)
44	DF	RUS	Yevgeny Postnikov (loan return from (Latvia) Ventspils)
45	FW	KAZ	Roman Murtazayev (from (Kazakhstan) Irtysh Pavlodar)
73	MF	KAZ	Didar Zhalmukan (from (Kazakhstan) Aktobe)

Out: Note: Flags indicate national team as defined under FIFA eligibility rules; some limited exceptions apply. Players may hold more than one non-FIFA nationality.

No.	Pos.	Nation	Player
8	MF	KAZ	Askhat Tagybergen (loan to (Kazakhstan) Tobol)
10	FW	SRB	Đorđe Despotović (loan to (Kazakhstan) Tobol)
13	MF	KAZ	Azat Nurgaliev (loan return to (Kazakhstan) Ordabasy)
14	MF	KAZ	Ardak Saulet (to (Kazakhstan) Aktobe)
17	FW	KAZ	Tanat Nusserbayev (to (Kazakhstan) Ordabasy)
21	DF	KAZ	Berik Shaikhov (loan to (Kazakhstan) Okzhetpes, previously on loan to (Kazakhstan) Zhetysu)
22	DF	KAZ	Konstantin Engel (to (Germany) VfL Osnabrück)
25	DF	KAZ	Serhiy Malyi (loan to (Kazakhstan) Tobol)
28	DF	KAZ	Birzhan Kulbekov
37	MF	KAZ	Amir Kalabayev
40	GK	KAZ	Mikhail Golubnichy (to (Kazakhstan) Okzhetpes)
48	DF	KAZ	Alexandr Berg
85	GK	KAZ	Vladimir Loginovsky (to (Kazakhstan) Taraz)
88	MF	COL	Roger Cañas (loan to (Cyprus) APOEL)
94	GK	KAZ	Abylaikhan Duysen (loan to (Latvia) Spartaks Jūrmala)
95	DF	KAZ	Amanbol Aliyev
—	FW	KAZ	Aleksey Shchotkin (loan to (Kazakhstan) Tobol, previously on loan to (Kazakhstan) Aktobe)

=== Summer ===
In: Note: Flags indicate national team as defined under FIFA eligibility rules; some limited exceptions apply. Players may hold more than one non-FIFA nationality.

No.	Pos.	Nation	Player
6	MF	HUN	László Kleinheisler (loan from (Germany) Werder Bremen)
9	FW	SRB	Đorđe Despotović (loan return from (Kazakhstan) Tobol)
14	MF	CRO	Marin Tomasov (loan from (Croatia) Rijeka)
17	MF	KAZ	Askhat Tagybergen (loan return from (Kazakhstan) Tobol)
21	DF	KAZ	Berik Shaikhov (loan return from (Kazakhstan) Okzhetpes)
25	DF	KAZ	Serhiy Malyi (loan return from (Kazakhstan) Tobol)
47	GK	KAZ	Abylaikhan Duysen (loan return from (Latvia) Spartaks Jūrmala)

Out: Note: Flags indicate national team as defined under FIFA eligibility rules; some limited exceptions apply. Players may hold more than one non-FIFA nationality.

No.	Pos.	Nation	Player
6	MF	SRB	Nemanja Maksimović (to (Spain) Valencia)
9	MF	MKD	Agim Ibraimi (to (Slovenia) Domžale)
10	FW	ALB	Azdren Llullaku (loan to (Kazakhstan) Tobol)
22	MF	KAZ	Gevorg Najaryan (loan to (Kazakhstan) Shakhter Karagandy)
31	MF	KAZ	Abay Zhunusov (loan to (Kazakhstan) Aktobe)
73	MF	KAZ	Didar Zhalmukan (loan to (Kazakhstan) Tobol)
88	MF	COL	Roger Cañas (to (Kazakhstan) Ordabasy, previously on loan at (Cyprus) APOEL)

== Friendlies ==
28 January 2017	Riga (Latvia)	0–2	(Kazakhstan) Astana	Dubai, United Arab Emirates
(UTC+6)		Report	Murtazayev; Llullaku

31 January 2017	Jeonbuk Hyundai Motors (South Korea)	0–3	(Kazakhstan) Astana	Dubai, United Arab Emirates
(UTC+6)			Nurgaliev; Muzhikov; D.Zhalmukan

8 February 2017	Oleksandriya (Ukraine)	2–2	(Kazakhstan) Astana	Turkey
(UTC+6)	Goal		Llullaku; Twumasi

11 February 2017	Željezničar Sarajevo (Bosnia and Herzegovina)	1–1	(Kazakhstan) Astana	Turkey
(UTC+6)			Murtazayev

14 February 2017	Zorya Luhansk (Ukraine)	0–1	(Kazakhstan) Astana	Turkey
(UTC+6)			Muzhikov

17 February 2017	Olimpija Ljubljana (Slovenia)	1–1	(Kazakhstan) Astana	Turkey
(UTC+6)	Kabananga		Oduwa

21 February 2017	Arsenal Tula (Russia)	0–0	(Kazakhstan) Astana	Turkey
(UTC+6)

== Competitions ==
=== Kazakhstan Super Cup ===
4 March 2017	Astana	0–2	Kairat	Almaty
15:00 (UTC+6)	Mayewski (yellow card) 57'; Logvinenko (yellow card) 84'	Report	Kuat (yellow card) 28' (yellow-red card) 90+5' (goal) 90+4'; Arshavin (yellow card) 60'; Arzo 76'; Marković (yellow card) 90+3'	Stadium: Central Stadium; Attendance: 13,500; Referee: Artyom Kuchin

=== Premier League ===
==== Results summary ====
Overall								Home						Away					
Pld	W	D	L	GF	GA	GD	Pts	W	D	L	GF	GA	GD	W	D	L	GF	GA	GD
33	25	4	4	74	21	+53	79	15	1	1	46	6	+40	10	3	3	28	15	+13

Last updated: 28 October 2017.
Source: See Results

==== Results by round ====
Round	1	2	3	4	5	6	7	8	9	10	11	12	13	14	15	16	17	18	19	20	21	22	23	24	25	26	27	28	29	30	31	32	33
Ground	A	A	H	A	A	H	A	H	A	H	A	H	A	H	A	H	A	H	A	H	H	H	A	H	A	H	A	A	H	A	H	H	H
Result	L	D	W	W	W	W	W	W	W	D	D	W	W	W	L	W	W	W	W	W	W	W	W	W	W	W	D	W	W	L	W	L	W
Position	12	10	7	3	5	3	1	1	1	1	1	1	1	1	1	1	1	1	1	1	1	1	1	1	1	2	2	1	1	1	1	1	1

Source: See Results
A = Away; H = Home; W = Win; D = Draw; L = Loss

==== Results ====
8 March 2017 1	Ordabasy	3–0	Astana	Shymkent
14:00 (UTC+6)	M.Tolebek 15'; E.Tungyshbaev (yellow card) 29'; Nurgaliev 74'; Diakate 88'	Report	Muzhikov (yellow card) 22'; Erić (yellow card) 71'	Stadium: Kazhymukan Munaitpasov Stadium; Attendance: 7,000; Referee: Igor Aleshin

12 March 2017 2	Irtysh Pavlodar	1–1	Astana	Pavlodar
15:00 (UTC+6)	Tkachuk 30'; A.Darabayev (yellow card) 40'	Report	Muzhikov 14'; Postnikov (yellow card) 84'	Stadium: Central Stadium; Attendance: 3,500; Referee: Denis Izmailov

15 March 2017 3	Astana	3–1	Akzhayik	Astana
17:30 (UTC+6)	Kabananga 12'; Llullaku 13'; Twumasi 62'; Mayewski (yellow card) 79'	Report	D.Schmidt (yellow card) 26'; Nikolić (yellow card) 48'; A.Shabaev (yellow card) 54'; Rubio 65'; Odibe (yellow card) 79'	Stadium: Astana Arena; Attendance: 1,500; Referee: Furkhat Atazhanov

1 April 2017 4	Shakhter Karagandy	1–2	Astana	Temirtau
15:00 (UTC+6)	M.Gabyshev 62'	Report	Kabananga 88'; Mayewski (yellow card) 88'; Skorykh 90+2' (o.g.)	Stadium: Metallurg Stadium; Attendance: 1,500; Referee: Aleksandr Metallurg Stadium

8 April 2017 5	Atyrau	0–1	Astana	Atyrau
16:00 (UTC+6)	Chichulin (yellow card) 10'	Report	D.Zhalmukan (yellow card) 60'; Logvinenko 84'	Stadium: Munaishy Stadium; Attendance: 1,500; Referee: Daniyar Sakhi

12 April 2017 6	Astana	3–0	Aktobe	Astana
15:00 (UTC+6)	Logvinenko 12'; Llullaku (yellow card) 63'; Grahovac (yellow card) 70'; Kabananga 87' (pen.); D.Zhalmukan 90+1'	Report	Volovyk (yellow card) 80'	Stadium: Tarlan Arena; Attendance: 1,000; Referee: Aleksandr Aliyev

16 April 2017 7	Okzhetpes	0–3	Astana	Astana
16:00 (UTC+6)	Strukov (yellow card) 44'; Yurin (yellow card) 87'	Report	Muzhikov 61'; Grahovac 64' (pen.); Murtazayev 79'	Stadium: Tarlan Arena; Attendance: 900; Referee: Anatolyi Vishnichenko

23 April 2017 8	Astana	4–0	Taraz	Astana
16:00 (UTC+6)	Grahovac 13'; Kabananga 33', 84'; Beisebekov (yellow card) 34'; D.Zhalmukan 43'	Report	M.Amirkhanov (yellow card) 40'	Stadium: Tarlan Arena; Attendance: 1,000; Referee: Furkhat Atazhanov

29 April 2017 9	Kaisar	0–3	Astana	Kyzylorda
16:00 (UTC+6)	Nikolić (yellow card) 30'; M.Islamkulov (red card) 73'	Report	Twumasi 28'; Mayewski 34'; Aničić (yellow card) 48'; Beisebekov (yellow card) 61'; Murtazayev 76' (pen.)	Stadium: Gani Muratbayev Stadium; Attendance: 5,000; Referee: Igor Aleshin

2 May 2017 10	Astana	1–1	Kairat	Astana
20:00 (UTC+6)	Twumasi (yellow card) 28'; Grahovac 87'; Mayewski (yellow card) 90+3'	Report	J.Vorogovsky (yellow card) 26'; Kuat 34'; Suyumbayev (yellow card) 62'; Gohou (yellow card) 76'	Stadium: Astana Arena; Attendance: 14,500; Referee: Anatoyli Vishnichenko

6 May 2017 11	Tobol	1–1	Astana	Kostanay
16:00 (UTC+6)	Shchotkin 71'	Report	Llullaku (yellow card) 63'; Kabananga 75'	Stadium: Stadion Zatobolets; Attendance: 2,000; Referee: Aydin Rakhimbayev

14 May 2017 12	Astana	2–0	Irtysh Pavlodar	Astana
18:00 (UTC+6)	Murtazayev 13'; Shomko (yellow card) 57'; D.Zhalmukan 79'	Report	I.Kalinin (yellow card) 27'; Fofana (yellow card) 32'; Aliev (yellow card) 62'; Fonseca (yellow card) 64'	Stadium: Astana Arena; Attendance: 8,000; Referee: Aleksandr Gauzer

20 May 2017 13	Akzhayik	0–2	Astana	Oral
18:00 (UTC+6)	Nikolić (yellow card) 57' (yellow-red card) 69'	Report	Logvinenko (yellow card) 53'; Mayewski 60'; Shomko (yellow card) 68'; Murtazayev 75'	Stadium: Petr Atoyan Stadium; Attendance: 2,000; Referee: Artyom Kuchin

28 May 2017 14	Astana	4–1	Shakhter Karagandy	Astana
18:00 (UTC+6)	Kabananga 10', 19', 56'; Muzhikov 24'; Shitov (yellow card) 50'	Report	Kadio (yellow card) 29'; A.Tattybaev 52'; Szöke (yellow card) 62'	Stadium: Astana Arena; Attendance: 7,000; Referee: Daniyar Sakhi

31 May 2017 20	Kairat	3–0	Astana	Almaty
20:30 (UTC+6)	Arshavin 22' (yellow card) 40'; Logvinenko 61' (o.g.); Iličević 77'; Kuat (yellow card) 83'	Report	Logvinenko (yellow card) 29'; Mayewski (yellow card) 70'; Beisebekov (yellow card) 90+3'	Stadium: Central Stadium; Attendance: 19,000; Referee: Denis Izmailov

3 June 2017 15	Astana	4–0	Atyrau	Astana
18:00 (UTC+6)	Kabananga 22', 73'; Grahovac 62' (pen.); Twumasi 66'	Report	Khairullin (yellow card) 41'; A.Suley (yellow card) 79'; A.Saparov (yellow card) 87'	Stadium: Astana Arena; Attendance: 4,500; Referee: Aleksei Bobrov

18 June 2017 16	Aktobe	2–4	Astana	Aktobe
19:00 (UTC+6)	Zyankovich 18'; B.Kairov (yellow card) 36'; Grahovac 45+1' (o.g.); Šimkovič (yellow card) 90+3'	Report	Twumasi 19', 56'; Kabananga 47'; Mayewski (yellow card) 52'; Muzhikov 86'; Beisebekov (yellow card) 90+3'	Stadium: Central Stadium; Attendance: 9,500; Referee: Bagdat Abdullaev

24 June 2017 17	Astana	3–0	Okzhetpes	Astana
18:00 (UTC+6)	Twumasi 39'; Grahovac 77'; Kabananga 78'	Report	Buleshev (yellow card) 84'	Stadium: Tarlan Arena; Attendance: 1,000; Referee: Artyom Kuchin

1 July 2017 18	Taraz	0–1	Astana	Taraz
19:00 (UTC+6)		Report	Postnikov (yellow card) 40'; Kabananga 67'	Stadium: Central Stadium; Attendance: 6,500; Referee: Furkat Atajanov

6 July 2017 19	Astana	2–0	Kaisar	Astana
18:30 (UTC+6)	Twumasi 14'; Logvinenko 70'	Report	Muldarov (yellow card) 68'	Stadium: Astana Arena; Attendance: 7,000; Referee: Igor Aleshin

22 July 2017 21	Astana	2–0	Tobol	Astana
18:00 (UTC+6)	Shomko (yellow card) 26'; Twumasi 43', 70'; Aničić (yellow card) 59'	Report	S.Zharynbektov (yellow card) 45'; Moldakaraev (yellow card) 57'; Kvekveskiri (yellow card) 69'	Stadium: Astana Arena; Attendance: 3,500; Referee: Askhat Abdanbayev

7 August 2017 22	Astana	1–0	Ordabasy	Astana
17:30 (UTC+6)	Beisebekov (yellow card) 56'; Grahovac (yellow card) 71'; Kleinheisler (yellow card) 87'; Tagybergen (yellow card) 90+3'	Report	B.Beisenov (yellow card) 4'; T.Erlanov (yellow card) 46'	Stadium: Astana Arena; Attendance: 4,000; Referee: Denis Izmailov

11 August 2017 23	Aktobe	0–3	Astana	Aktobe
21:00 (UTC+6)	Valiullin (yellow card) 32'; Volovyk (yellow card) 41'; B.Kairov (yellow card) 66'	Report	Zyankovich 33' (o.g.); Kabananga 51'; Muzhikov (yellow card) 65'; Grahovac 79'	Stadium: Central Stadium; Attendance: 11,000; Referee: Anatolyi Vishnichenko

19 August 2017 24	Astana	v	Okzhetpes	Astana
(UTC+6)				Stadium: Astana Arena

27 August 2017 25	Shakhter Karagandy	v	Astana	Temirtau
(UTC+6)				Stadium: Metallurg Stadium

9 September 2017 26	Astana	7–0	Atyrau	Astana
17:00 (UTC+6)	Muzhikov 28', 38'; Murtazayev 44'; Tomasov 60', 89'; Grahovac 69'; Twumasi 87'	Report	A.Suley (yellow card) 43'	Stadium: Astana Arena; Attendance: 2,500; Referee: Aleksandr Gauzer

18 September 2017 27	Kaisar	1–4	Astana	Kyzylorda
17:30 (UTC+6)	Zhangylyshbay 46'; Muldarov (yellow card) 55'; R.Sakhalbayev (yellow card) 75'	Report	Grahovac 60'; Shitov 65'; Logvinenko 76'; Tagybergen 90'	Stadium: Gani Muratbayev Stadium; Attendance: 1,500; Referee: Denis Tevyashov

23 September 2017 28	Astana	2–0	Taraz	Astana
15:00 (UTC+6)	Twumasi 21'; Postnikov 26'	Report	Feshchuk (yellow card) 75'	Stadium: Astana Arena; Attendance: 2,000; Referee: Denis Izmailov

1 October 2017 29	Tobol	1–1	Astana	Kostanay
16:00 (UTC+6)	Moldakaraev 33'	Report	Tagybergen (yellow card) 34'; Shomko 41' (yellow card) 51'; Shitov (yellow card) 86'	Stadium: Central Stadium; Attendance: 2,500; Referee: Daniyar Sakhi

11 October 2017 25	Shakhter Karagandy	0–1	Astana	Temirtau
16:00 (UTC+6)	I.Mangutkin (yellow card) 70'	Report	Malyi (yellow card) 35'; Kabananga (yellow card) 40' (goal) 70' (pen.); Murtazayev (yellow card) 85'	Stadium: Metallurg Stadium; Attendance: 1,000; Referee: Furkhat Atazhanov

15 October 2017 30	Astana	2–1	Irtysh Pavlodar	Astana
15:00 (UTC+6)	Postnikov (yellow card) 45+1'; Murtazayev 52'; Twumasi 64' (pen.); Beisebekov (yellow card) 90+2'	Report	António 41'; Stamenković (yellow card) 59'; Aliev (yellow card) 72'	Stadium: Astana Arena; Attendance: 4,000; Referee: Aleksei Bobrov

22 October 2017 31	Ordabasy	2–1	Astana	Shymkent
15:00 (UTC+6)	Tungyshbayev 35' (yellow card) 78'; Diakate 62'; Nurgaliev (yellow card) 88'	Report	B.Shaikhov (yellow card) 22'; Despotović 60'; Tagybergen (yellow card) 61'	Stadium: Kazhymukan Munaitpasov Stadium; Attendance: 6,500; Referee: Bagdat Abdullaev

25 October 2017 24	Astana	4–0	Okzhetpes	Astana
19:00 (UTC+6)	Mayewski 10'; Kabananga 20'; Twumasi 61'; Shitov (yellow card) 64'; Abdulin 80' (o.g.)	Report		Stadium: Astana Arena; Attendance: 500; Referee: Bolat Saryev

28 October 2017 32	Astana	0–2	Kairat	Astana
15:00 (UTC+6)	Twumasi (yellow card) 45'; Shomko (yellow card) 45+2'; Mayewski (yellow card) 67'	Report	Bateau (yellow card) 45+2'; Abiken 71'; Kuat (yellow card) 82'; Gohou 88'; Pokatilov (yellow card) 90+3'	Stadium: Astana Arena; Attendance: 12,000; Referee: Denis Izmailov

5 November 2017 33	Astana	2– 0	Akzhayik	Astana
15:00 (UTC+6)	Kabananga 50', 90+4'; Shitov (yellow card) 61'	Report		Stadium: Astana Arena; Attendance: 7,000; Referee: Artyom Kuchin

==== League table ====
Pos	Team	Pld	W	D	L	GF	GA	GD	Pts	Qualification or relegation
1	Astana (C)	33	25	4	4	74	21	+53	79	Qualification for the Champions League first qualifying round
2	Kairat	33	23	9	1	75	28	+47	78	Qualification for the Europa League first qualifying round (Note: Kairat qualified for the Europa League first qualifying round by winning the 2017 Kazakhstan Cup.)
3	Ordabasy	33	18	4	11	44	37	+7	58	
4	Irtysh Pavlodar	33	12	12	9	35	32	+3	48	Qualification for the Europa League first qualifying round (Note: Ordabasy would have qualified too, but they failed to obtain a licence, so Tobol took their place.)
5	Tobol	33	12	11	10	36	26	+10	47	Qualification for the Europa League first qualifying round

Source: UEFA, Soccerway
Rules for classification: 1) Points; 2) Head-to-head points; 3) Head-to-head matches won; 4) Head-to-head goal difference; 5) Head-to-head goals scored; 6) Head-to-head away goals scored; 7) Goal difference; 8) Matches won; 9) Goals scored; 10) Away goals scored; 11) Draw.
(C) Champions

=== Kazakhstan Cup ===
19 April 2017 Last 16	Zhetysu	2–1	Astana	Taldykorgan
16:00 (UTC+6)	S.Ibraev (yellow card) 43'; Hromțov 75'; A.Shakin 86'; A.Shabanov (yellow card) 90+3'	Report	Beisebekov 5'	Stadium: Zhetysu Stadium; Attendance: 1,500; Referee: Dmitiry Bystrov

=== UEFA Champions League ===
==== Qualifying rounds ====
12 July 2017 Second qualifying round 1st leg	Spartaks Jūrmala (Latvia)	0–1	(Kazakhstan) Astana	Jūrmala, Latvia
20:00 (UTC+6)	Ibragimov (yellow card) 26'; E.Vardanjans (yellow card) 33'; J.Kazačoks (yellow card) 50'	Report	Shitov (yellow card) 29'; Logvinenko (yellow card) 47'; Muzhikov (yellow card) 66'; Twumasi 73'; Grahovac (yellow card) 74'	Stadium: Slokas Stadium; Attendance: 1,987; Referee: Neil Doyle (Republic of Ireland)

18 July 2017 Second qualifying round 2nd leg	Astana (Kazakhstan)	1–1 (2–1 agg.)	(Latvia) Spartaks Jūrmala	Astana, Kazakhstan
20:00 (UTC+6)	Twumasi 59'	Report	I.Stuglis (yellow card) 43'; E.Vardanjans 72' (yellow card) 90'; Platonaw (yellow card) 75'	Stadium: Astana Arena; Attendance: 20,500; Referee: Charalambos Kalogeropoulos (Greece)

26 July 2017 Third qualifying round 1st leg	Astana (Kazakhstan)	3–1	(Poland) Legia Warsaw	Astana, Kazakhstan
20:00 (UTC+6)	Muzhikov (yellow card) 32'; Kabananga 36' (yellow card) 84'; Mayewski 45'; Logvinenko (yellow card) 83'; Twumasi 90+4'; Aničić (yellow card) 90+6'	Report	Sadiku 78'	Stadium: Astana Arena; Attendance: 26,100; Referee: Tamás Bognár (Hungary)

3 August 2017 Third qualifying round 2nd leg	Legia Warsaw (Poland)	1–0 (2–3 agg.)	(Kazakhstan) Astana	Warsaw, Poland
00:45 (UTC+6)	Jędrzejczyk (yellow card) 59'; Czerwiński 76'; Nagy (yellow card) 81'	Report	Mayewski (yellow card) 16'; Shomko (yellow card) 59'; Twumasi (yellow card) 74'	Stadium: Polish Army Stadium; Attendance: 24,937; Referee: Jakob Kehlet (Denmark)

17 August 2017 Playoff round 1st leg	Celtic (Scotland)	5–0	(Kazakhstan) Astana	Glasgow, Scotland
00:45 (UTC+6)	Postnikov 32' (o.g.); Brown (yellow card) 40'; Sinclair 42', 60'; Tierney (yellow card) 49'; Forrest 79'; Shitov 88' (o.g.)	Report	Postnikov (yellow card) 6'; Logvinenko (yellow card) 63'; Shitov (yellow card) 69'	Stadium: Celtic Park; Attendance: 54,016; Referee: Ovidiu Hațegan (Romania)

22 August 2017 Playoff round 2nd leg	Astana (Kazakhstan)	4–3 (4–8 agg.)	(Scotland) Celtic	Astana, Kazakhstan
21:30 (UTC+6)	Ajer 26' (o.g.); Muzhikov 48'; Twumasi 49', 69'; Postnikov (yellow card) 70'; Shomko (yellow card) 82'; Grahovac (yellow card) 90+2'	Report	Sinclair 34'; Ntcham 81'; Griffiths 90'	Stadium: Astana Arena; Referee: Pavel Královec (Czech Republic)

=== UEFA Europa League ===
==== Group stage ====
Pos	Team	Pld	W	D	L	GF	GA	GD	Pts	Qualification	VIL	AST	SLP	MTA
1	(Spain) Villarreal	6	3	2	1	10	6	+4	11	Advance to knockout phase	—	3–1	2–2	0–1
2	(Kazakhstan) Astana	6	3	1	2	10	7	+3	10	Advance to knockout phase	2–3	—	1–1	4–0
3	(Czech Republic) Slavia Prague	6	2	2	2	6	6	0	8		0–2	0–1	—	1–0
4	(Israel) Maccabi Tel Aviv	6	1	1	4	1	8	−7	4		0–0	0–1	0–2	—

Source: UEFA

14 September 2017 1	Villarreal (Spain)	3–1	(Kazakhstan) Astana	Villarreal, Spain
23:00 (UTC+6)	Sansone 16'; Bakambu 75'; Cheryshev 77'; Mario (yellow card) 88'	Report	Logvinenko (yellow card) 57' (goal) 68'; Aničić (yellow card) 71'	Stadium: Estadio de la Cerámica; Attendance: 14,670; Referee: Srđan Jovanović (Serbia)

28 September 2017 2	Astana (Kazakhstan)	1–1	(Czech Republic) Slavia Prague	Astana, Kazakhstan
21:00 (UTC+6)	Muzhikov (yellow card) 27'; Tomasov 42'; Postnikov (yellow card) 85'	Report	Ngadeu-Ngadjui 18'; Jugas (yellow card) 32'; Bořil (yellow card) 39'; Sobol (yellow card) 63'	Stadium: Astana Arena; Attendance: 17,215; Referee: Andreas Ekberg (Sweden)

19 October 2017 3	Astana (Kazakhstan)	4–0	(Israel) Maccabi Tel Aviv	Astana, Kazakhstan
22:00 (UTC+6)	Muzhikov (yellow card) 13'; Twumasi 33' (pen.), 42'; Kabananga 47', 52'; Shitov (yellow card) 61'	Report	Peretz (yellow card) 33'; Blackman (yellow card) 41'	Stadium: Astana Arena; Attendance: 10,350; Referee: Serhiy Boyko (Ukraine)

3 November 2017 4	Maccabi Tel Aviv (Israel)	0–1	(Kazakhstan) Astana	Netanya (Note: Maccabi Tel Aviv will play their home matches at Netanya Stadium, Netanya, instead of their regular stadium Bloomfield Stadium, Tel Aviv, due to renovation.), Israel
00:00 (UTC+6)	Schoenfeld (yellow card) 66'	Report	Tagybergen (yellow card) 39'; Twumasi 57'	Stadium: Netanya Stadium; Attendance: 7,934; Referee: Paweł Raczkowski (Poland)

23 November 2017 5	Astana (Kazakhstan)	2–3	(Spain) Villarreal	Astana, Kazakhstan
22:00 (UTC+6)	Kabananga 22' (yellow card) 90+4'; Shomko (yellow card) 43'; Mayewski (yellow card) 70'; Twumasi 88'; Grahovac (yellow card) 90+2'	Report	Raba 39'; Marín (yellow card) 63'; Bakambu 65', 83'; Sansone (yellow card) 76'	Stadium: Astana Arena; Attendance: 29,800; Referee: Gediminas Mažeika (Lithuania)

8 December 2017 6	Slavia Prague (Czech Republic)	0–1	(Kazakhstan) Astana	Prague, Czech Republic
00:00 (UTC+6)	Sobol (yellow card) 42'; Stoch (yellow card) 88'; Necid (yellow card) 90+5'	Report	Aničić 39'; Muzhikov (yellow card) 53'; Erić (yellow card) 78'; Shitov (yellow card) 83'	Stadium: Eden Arena; Attendance: 14,198; Referee: Davide Massa (Italy)

== Squad statistics ==
As of match played 8 December 2017

=== Appearances and goals ===
No.	Pos	Nat	Player	Total		Premier League		Kazakhstan Cup		Super Cup		Champions League		Europa League	
No.	Pos	Nat	Player	Apps	Goals	Apps	Goals	Apps	Goals	Apps	Goals	Apps	Goals	Apps	Goals
1	GK	(Kazakhstan) KAZ	Nenad Erić	19	0	10	0	1	0	1	0	1	0	6	0
4	DF	(Belarus) BLR	Igor Shitov	41	1	25+2	1	1	0	0+1	0	6	0	5+1	0
5	DF	(Bosnia and Herzegovina) BIH	Marin Aničić	35	1	24	0	0	0	1	0	5	0	4+1	1
6	MF	(Hungary) HUN	László Kleinheisler	10	0	3+1	0	0	0	0	0	6	0	0	0
7	MF	(Kazakhstan) KAZ	Serikzhan Muzhikov	43	7	29+1	6	0	0	1	0	6	1	5+1	0
8	MF	(Bosnia and Herzegovina) BIH	Srđan Grahovac	36	8	22+4	8	0	0	0	0	2+4	0	2+2	0
9	FW	(Serbia) SRB	Đorđe Despotović	11	1	2+5	1	0	0	0	0	1+1	0	0+2	0
14	MF	(Croatia) CRO	Marin Tomasov	19	3	8+3	2	0	0	0	0	2	0	3+3	1
15	DF	(Kazakhstan) KAZ	Abzal Beisebekov	39	1	19+8	0	1	1	1	0	0+5	0	5	0
17	MF	(Kazakhstan) KAZ	Askhat Tagybergen	14	2	3+6	2	0	0	0	0	0+1	0	1+3	0
18	MF	(Belarus) BLR	Ivan Mayewski	43	4	28+2	3	0	0	1	0	6	1	6	0
21	DF	(Kazakhstan) KAZ	Berik Shaikhov	3	0	2+1	0	0	0	0	0	0	0	0	0
23	FW	(Ghana) GHA	Patrick Twumasi	44	22	20+10	13	1	0	1	0	6	5	6	4
25	DF	(Kazakhstan) KAZ	Serhiy Malyi	5	0	3	0	0	0	0	0	0	0	1+1	0
27	DF	(Kazakhstan) KAZ	Yuriy Logvinenko	41	5	22+7	4	1	0	1	0	5	0	5	1
30	FW	(Democratic Republic of the Congo) COD	Junior Kabananga	43	23	30+1	19	0	0	1	0	6	1	5	3
35	GK	(Kazakhstan) KAZ	Aleksandr Mokin	29	0	23+1	0	0	0	0	0	5	0	0	0
44	DF	(Russia) RUS	Yevgeny Postnikov	39	1	23+5	1	1	0	1	0	2+3	0	4	0
45	FW	(Kazakhstan) KAZ	Roman Murtazayev	44	6	22+10	6	1	0	0+1	0	1+4	0	2+3	0
54	FW	(Kazakhstan) KAZ	Viktor Pron	1	0	0+1	0	0	0	0	0	0	0	0	0
70	MF	(Kazakhstan) KAZ	Sultan Sagnayev	1	0	0	0	0+1	0	0	0	0	0	0	0
71	MF	(Kazakhstan) KAZ	Madi Zhakypbayev	2	0	0+1	0	1	0	0	0	0	0	0	0
77	DF	(Kazakhstan) KAZ	Dmitri Shomko	44	1	30+1	1	0	0	1	0	6	0	6	0
80	FW	(Kazakhstan) KAZ	Vladislav Prokopenko	4	0	2+2	0	0	0	0	0	0	0	0	0
99	DF	(Kazakhstan) KAZ	Talgat Kusyapov	1	0	0+1	0	0	0	0	0	0	0	0	0
Players away from Astana on loan:
10	FW	(Albania) ALB	Azdren Llullaku	19	1	10+7	1	1	0	1	0	0	0	0	0
22	MF	(Kazakhstan) KAZ	Gevorg Najaryan	2	0	0+1	0	1	0	0	0	0	0	0	0
31	MF	(Kazakhstan) KAZ	Abay Zhunusov	1	0	0	0	1	0	0	0	0	0	0	0
73	MF	(Kazakhstan) KAZ	Didar Zhalmukan	19	3	4+13	3	0+1	0	0+1	0	0	0	0	0
Players who left Astana during the season:

=== Goal scorers ===
Place	Position	Nation	Number	Name	Premier League	Kazakhstan Cup	Super Cup	Champions League	Europa League	Total
1	FW	(Democratic Republic of the Congo)	30	Junior Kabananga	19	0	0	1	3	23
2	FW	(Ghana)	23	Patrick Twumasi	13	0	0	5	4	22
3	MF	(Bosnia and Herzegovina)	8	Srđan Grahovac	8	0	0	0	0	8
4	MF	(Kazakhstan)	7	Serikzhan Muzhikov	6	0	0	1	0	7
5	FW	(Kazakhstan)	45	Roman Murtazayev	6	0	0	0	0	6
6	DF	(Kazakhstan)	27	Yuriy Logvinenko	4	0	0	0	1	5
7	MF	(Belarus)	18	Ivan Mayewski	3	0	0	1	0	4
7				Own goal	3	0	0	1	0	4
9	FW	(Kazakhstan)	73	Didar Zhalmukan	3	0	0	0	0	3
9	MF	(Croatia)	14	Marin Tomasov	2	0	0	0	1	3
11	MF	(Kazakhstan)	17	Askhat Tagybergen	2	0	0	0	0	2
12	FW	(Albania)	10	Azdren Llullaku	1	0	0	0	0	1
12	DF	(Belarus)	4	Igor Shitov	1	0	0	0	0	1
12	DF	(Russia)	44	Yevgeny Postnikov	1	0	0	0	0	1
12	DF	(Kazakhstan)	77	Dmitri Shomko	1	0	0	0	0	1
12	FW	(Serbia)	9	Đorđe Despotović	1	0	0	0	0	1
12	DF	(Kazakhstan)	15	Abzal Beisebekov	0	1	0	0	0	1
12	DF	(Bosnia and Herzegovina)	5	Marin Aničić	0	0	0	0	1	1
				TOTALS	74	1	0	9	10	94

=== Clean sheets ===
Place	Position	Nation	Number	Name	Premier League	Kazakhstan Cup	Super Cup	Champions League	Europa League	Total
1	GK	(Kazakhstan)	35	Aleksandr Mokin	12	0	0	1	0	13
2	GK	(Kazakhstan)	1	Nenad Erić	7	0	0	0	3	10
				TOTALS	19	0	0	1	3	23

=== Disciplinary record ===
Number	Nation	Position	Name	Premier League		Kazakhstan Cup		Super Cup		Champions League		Europa League		Total	
Number	Nation	Position	Name	Yellow card	Red card	Yellow card	Red card	Yellow card	Red card	Yellow card	Red card	Yellow card	Red card	Yellow card	Red card
1	(Kazakhstan)	GK	Nenad Erić	1	0	0	0	0	0	0	0	1	0	2	0
4	(Belarus)	DF	Igor Shitov	4	0	0	0	0	0	2	0	2	0	8	0
5	(Bosnia and Herzegovina)	DF	Marin Aničić	2	0	0	0	0	0	1	0	1	0	4	0
6	(Hungary)	MF	László Kleinheisler	1	0	0	0	0	0	0	0	0	0	1	0
7	(Kazakhstan)	MF	Serikzhan Muzhikov	2	0	0	0	0	0	2	0	3	0	7	0
8	(Bosnia and Herzegovina)	MF	Srđan Grahovac	2	0	0	0	0	0	2	0	1	0	5	0
15	(Kazakhstan)	DF	Abzal Beisebekov	7	0	0	0	0	0	0	0	0	0	7	0
17	(Kazakhstan)	MF	Askhat Tagybergen	2	0	0	0	0	0	0	0	1	0	3	0
18	(Belarus)	MF	Ivan Mayewski	6	0	0	0	1	0	1	0	1	0	9	0
21	(Kazakhstan)	DF	Berik Shaikhov	1	0	0	0	0	0	0	0	0	0	1	0
23	(Ghana)	FW	Patrick Twumasi	2	0	0	0	0	0	1	0	0	0	3	0
25	(Kazakhstan)	DF	Serhiy Malyi	1	0	0	0	0	0	0	0	0	0	1	0
27	(Kazakhstan)	DF	Yuriy Logvinenko	2	0	0	0	1	0	3	0	1	0	7	0
30	(Democratic Republic of the Congo)	FW	Junior Kabananga	1	0	0	0	0	0	1	0	1	0	3	0
44	(Russia)	DF	Yevgeny Postnikov	3	0	0	0	0	0	2	0	1	0	6	0
77	(Kazakhstan)	DF	Dmitri Shomko	5	0	0	0	0	0	2	0	1	0	8	0
Players away on loan:
10	(Albania)	FW	Azdren Llullaku	2	0	0	0	0	0	0	0	0	0	2	0
73	(Kazakhstan)	MF	Didar Zhalmukan	1	0	0	0	0	0	0	0	0	0	1	0
Players who left Astana during the season:
			TOTALS	43	0	0	0	2	0	17	0	14	0	76	0
