= 2015 FC Astana season =

FC Astana
2015 season
- Chairman: Kaisar Bekenov
- Manager: Stanimir Stoilov
- Stadium: Astana Arena
- Premier League: Champions
- Kazakhstan Cup: Runners-up vs Kairat
- Champions League: Group Stage
- Kazakhstan Super Cup: Champions
- Top goalscorer: League: Tanat Nusserbayev (11); All: Patrick Twumasi (14)
- Highest home attendance: 30,000 vs APOEL (18 August 2015)
- Lowest home attendance: 1,500 vs Okzhetpes (7 March 2015)
- Average home league attendance: 9,564 (25 November 2015)
Home colours	Away colours

The 2015 FC Astana season is the seventh successive season that the club will play in the Kazakhstan Premier League, the highest tier of association football in Kazakhstan.Astana is the reigning Kazakhstan Premier League champion, having won the title for the first time the previous season. They will also participate in the Kazakhstan Cup and the Champions League, entering at the Second Qualifying Stage.

== Squad ==
As of match played 9 December 2015

No.	Name	Nationality	Position	Date of birth (age)	Signed from	Signed in	Apps.	Goals
Goalkeepers
1	Nenad Erić	(Kazakhstan)	GK	26 May 1982 (aged 33)	Kairat	2011	160	0
35	Aleksandr Konochkin	(Kazakhstan)	GK	20 January 1994 (aged 21)	Academy	2011	0	0
40	Mikhail Golubnichi	(Kazakhstan)	GK	31 January 1995 (aged 20)	Bayterek	2015	7	0
49	Dastan Dulatov	(Kazakhstan)	GK	14 April 1996 (aged 19)	Academy	2015	0	0
85	Vladimir Loginovsky	(Kazakhstan)	GK	8 October 1985 (aged 30)	Zhetysu	2013	27	0
Defenders
2	Yeldos Akhmetov	(Kazakhstan)	DF	1 June 1990 (aged 25)	Taraz	2013	50	1
5	Marin Aničić	(Bosnia and Herzegovina)	DF	17 August 1989 (aged 26)	Zrinjski Mostar	2014	77	1
12	Igor Pikalkin	(Kazakhstan)	DF	19 March 1992 (aged 23)	Shakhter Karagandy	2013	36	0
28	Birzhan Kulbekov	(Kazakhstan)	DF	22 April 1994 (aged 21)	Academy	2015	9	1
33	Branko Ilić	(Slovenia)	DF	6 February 1983 (aged 32)	Partizan	2015	21	0
34	Adil Zhakipbaev	(Kazakhstan)	DF	23 November 1994 (aged 21)	Academy	2013	0	0
36	Erbol Zhaylaubekov	(Kazakhstan)	DF	3 August 1996 (aged 19)	Academy	2015	0	0
42	Abilkair Ismailov	(Kazakhstan)	DF	26 March 1995 (aged 20)	Academy	2015	0	0
44	Yevgeny Postnikov	(Russia)	DF	16 April 1986 (aged 29)	Shakhtyor Soligorsk	2014	70	1
50	Ayhan Kozhabekov	(Kazakhstan)	DF	1 July 1996 (aged 19)	Academy	2015	0	0
57	Sanjar Umurzakov	(Kazakhstan)	DF	3 May 1996 (aged 19)	Academy	2013	0	0
77	Dmitri Shomko	(Kazakhstan)	DF	19 March 1990 (aged 25)	Irtysh Pavlodar	2014	91	6
Midfielders
6	Nemanja Maksimović	(Serbia)	MF	26 January 1995 (aged 20)	Domžale	2015	38	7
7	Serikzhan Muzhikov	(Kazakhstan)	MF	17 June 1989 (aged 26)	Zhetysu	2014	44	2
8	Georgy Zhukov	(Kazakhstan)	MF	19 November 1994 (aged 21)	loan from Standard Liège	2014	66	2
10	Foxi Kéthévoama	(Central African Republic)	MF	30 May 1986 (aged 29)	Kecskeméti	2013	146	34
14	Ardak Saulet	(Kazakhstan)	MF	12 January 1997 (aged 18)	Academy	2014	0	0
15	Abzal Beisebekov	(Kazakhstan)	MF	30 November 1992 (aged 23)	Vostok	2012	132	4
19	Aleksey Rodionov	(Kazakhstan)	MF	29 March 1994 (aged 21)	Atyrau	2015	2	0
20	Zhakyp Kozhamberdi	(Kazakhstan)	MF	26 February 1992 (aged 23)	Taraz	2015	1	0
24	Denys Dedechko	(Ukraine)	MF	2 July 1987 (aged 28)	Vorskla Poltava	2015	16	1
31	Islambek Kulekenov	(Kazakhstan)	MF	15 September 1994 (aged 21)	Academy	2013	1	0
37	Amir Kalabayev	(Kazakhstan)	MF	13 November 1996 (aged 19)	Academy	2015	0	0
38	Zholaman Tabigat	(Kazakhstan)	MF	18 July 1996 (aged 19)	Academy	2015	0	0
46	Madiyar Mukametzhanov	(Kazakhstan)	MF	1 May 1996 (aged 19)	Academy	2015	0	0
51	Alexander Sharifullin	(Kazakhstan)	MF	21 March 1995 (aged 20)	Academy	2013	0	0
54	Aizat Bersembaev	(Kazakhstan)	MF	14 January 1996 (aged 19)	Academy	2015	0	0
66	Temirlanali Begimbay	(Kazakhstan)	MF	9 September 1995 (aged 20)	Academy	2014	0	0
80	Kuat Seksimbayev	(Kazakhstan)	MF	28 March 1995 (aged 20)	Academy	2015	0	0
88	Roger Cañas	(Colombia)	MF	27 March 1990 (aged 25)	Shakhter Karagandy	2014	82	14
95	Madi Zamataev	(Kazakhstan)	MF	28 March 1995 (aged 20)	Academy	2013	0	0
99	Islam Akhmetov	(Kazakhstan)	MF	3 July 1995 (aged 20)	Academy	2013	0	0
Forwards
9	Aleksey Shchotkin	(Kazakhstan)	FW	21 May 1991 (aged 24)	Taraz	2015	32	4
17	Tanat Nusserbayev	(Kazakhstan)	FW	1 January 1987 (aged 28)	Ordabasy	2011	162	46
23	Patrick Twumasi	(Ghana)	FW	9 May 1994 (aged 21)	Spartaks Jūrmala	2015	68	32
22	Bauyrzhan Dzholchiyev	(Kazakhstan)	FW	8 May 1990 (aged 25)	Tobol	2014	73	15
26	Adil Balgabayev	(Kazakhstan)	MF	13 July 1995 (aged 20)	Academy	2014	1	0
29	Daulet Esbergenov	(Kazakhstan)	FW	16 September 1996 (aged 19)	Academy	2015	0	0
45	Victor Pron	(Kazakhstan)	FW	23 September 1997 (aged 18)	Academy	2015	0	0
69	Igor Aspendikov	(Kazakhstan)	FW	31 May 1996 (aged 19)	Academy	2015	0	0
89	Junior Kabananga	(Democratic Republic of the Congo)	FW	4 April 1989 (aged 26)	Cercle Brugge	2015	25	5
Players away on loan
7	Ulan Konysbayev	(Kazakhstan)	MF	28 May 1989 (aged 26)	Shakhter Karagandy	2015	94	9
25	Toktar Zhangylyshbay	(Kazakhstan)	FW	25 May 1993 (aged 22)	Shakhter Karagandy	2015	5	0
Players that left during the season
3	Kasper Larsen	(Denmark)	DF	25 January 1993 (aged 22)	loan from OB	2015	0	0
9	Sergei Ostapenko	(Kazakhstan)	FW	23 February 1986 (aged 29)	Kaisar	2015	96	19
13	Berik Shaikhov	(Kazakhstan)	DF	20 February 1994 (aged 21)	Zhetysu	2015	1	0
16	Vladislav Mendybaev	(Kazakhstan)	MF	1 May 1996 (aged 19)	Academy	2013	2	0
55	Pavel Khalezov	(Kazakhstan)	DF	10 August 1994 (aged 21)	Academy	2014	2	0
	Damir Kojašević	(Montenegro)	MF	3 June 1987 (aged 28)	Budućnost Podgorica	2013	77	17

== Transfers ==
=== Winter ===
In: Note: Flags indicate national team as defined under FIFA eligibility rules; some limited exceptions apply. Players may hold more than one non-FIFA nationality.

No.	Pos.	Nation	Player
3	DF	DEN	Kasper Larsen (loan from (Denmark) OB)
6	MF	SRB	Nemanja Maksimović (from (Slovenia) NK Domžale)
7	MF	KAZ	Ulan Konysbayev (from (Kazakhstan) Shakhter Karagandy)
9	FW	KAZ	Aleksey Shchotkin (from (Kazakhstan) Taraz)
13	DF	KAZ	Berik Shaikhov (from (Kazakhstan) Zhetysu)
19	MF	KAZ	Aleksey Rodionov (from (Kazakhstan) Atyrau)
21	FW	KAZ	Sergei Ostapenko (from (Kazakhstan) Kaisar)
23	FW	GHA	Patrick Twumasi (from (Latvia) Spartaks Jūrmala, previously on loan)
25	FW	KAZ	Toktar Zhangylyshbay (from (Kazakhstan) Shakhter Karagandy)
40	GK	KAZ	Mikhail Golubnichi (from (Kazakhstan) Irtysh)

Out: Note: Flags indicate national team as defined under FIFA eligibility rules; some limited exceptions apply. Players may hold more than one non-FIFA nationality.

No.	Pos.	Nation	Player
4	DF	KAZ	Viktor Dmitrenko (to (Kazakhstan) Aktobe)
6	DF	KAZ	Kairat Nurdauletov (to (Kazakhstan) Kaisar)
7	MF	MNE	Damir Kojašević (loan to (Uzbekistan) Lokomotiv Tashkent)
8	MF	KAZ	Marat Shakhmetov (to (Kazakhstan) Zhetysu)
13	MF	KAZ	Serikzhan Muzhikov (to (Kazakhstan) Kaisar)
16	DF	KAZ	Yevgeni Goryachi (to (Kazakhstan) Okzhetpes)
24	GK	KAZ	Denis Tolebayev (to (Kazakhstan) Irtysh)
25	MF	CMR	Guy Essame (loan return to (Kazakhstan) Atyrau)
31	MF	KAZ	Azat Smagulov
32	MF	KAZ	Rinat Khairullin (to (Kazakhstan) Zhetysu)
36	DF	KAZ	Chingizkhan Asylkhanuly
39	DF	KAZ	Farhat Dzhanibekov
42	FW	KAZ	Ilyas Kuanyshbay
47	MF	KAZ	Rasul Marua
63	MF	KAZ	Amanbol Aliyev
71	DF	KAZ	Igilik Akanov
76	FW	BUL	Atanas Kurdov
78	GK	KAZ	Rimas Martinkus
79	GK	KAZ	Aleksandr Sidorov
87	FW	KAZ	Igor Popadinets

=== Summer ===
In: Note: Flags indicate national team as defined under FIFA eligibility rules; some limited exceptions apply. Players may hold more than one non-FIFA nationality.

No.	Pos.	Nation	Player
7	MF	KAZ	Serikzhan Muzhikov (from (Kazakhstan) Kaisar)
20	MF	KAZ	Zhakyp Kozhamberdy (from (Kazakhstan) Taraz)
24	MF	UKR	Denys Dedechko (from (Ukraine) Vorskla Poltava)
33	DF	SLO	Branko Ilić (from (Serbia) Partizan)
89	FW	COD	Junior Kabananga (from (Belgium) Cercle Brugge)
—	MF	KAZ	Rinat Khayrullin (from (Kazakhstan) Zhetysu)

Out: Note: Flags indicate national team as defined under FIFA eligibility rules; some limited exceptions apply. Players may hold more than one non-FIFA nationality.

No.	Pos.	Nation	Player
3	DF	DEN	Kasper Larsen (loan return to (Denmark) OB)
7	MF	KAZ	Ulan Konysbayev (loan to (Kazakhstan) Kairat)
13	DF	KAZ	Berik Shaikhov (to (Kazakhstan) Irtysh)
16	MF	KAZ	Vladislav Mendybayev
25	FW	KAZ	Toktar Zhangylyshbay (loan to (Kazakhstan) Kairat)
—	MF	MNE	Damir Kojašević (to (Montenegro) Mladost Podgorica. previously on loan at (Uzbekistan) Lokomotiv Tashkent)

== Friendlies ==
18 January 2015	Hamburg (Germany)	0 – 0	(Kazakhstan) Astana	Dubai, United Arab Emirates
18:00 (UTC+6)		Report		Stadium: Jebel Ali stadium Referee: Abdulla al Balushi

21 January 2015	Krylia Sovetov (Russia)	1 – 1	(Kazakhstan) Astana	Dubai, United Arab Emirates
18:00 (UTC+6)	Konysbayev 43'	https://www.kc-camapa.ru/cgi-bin/newsprn.cgi?11729 https://www.fca.kz/rus/online/218/	Jahović 52'	Stadium: Jebel Ali stadium

1 February 2015	FK Rad (Serbia)	0 – 2	(Kazakhstan) Astana	Antalya, Turkey
(UTC+6)		Report	Akhmetov 29'; Kéthévoama 71'	Stadium: Mardan Stadium

4 February 2015	Bunyodkor (Uzbekistan)	0 – 1	(Kazakhstan) Astana	Antalya, Turkey
(UTC+6)		Report	Zhangylyshbay 86'	Stadium: Mardan Stadium; Referee: Carol Rudzhinski

8 February 2015	Pandurii Târgu Jiu (Romania)	0 – 2	(Kazakhstan) Astana	Antalya, Turkey
(UTC+6)		Report	Kéthévoama 8'; Dzholchiev 90'	Stadium: Mardan Stadium; Referee: Ali Akcinar

10 February 2015	Zorya Luhansk (Ukraine)	3 – 1	(Kazakhstan) Astana	Antalya, Turkey
(UTC+6)	Lipartia 51' (pen.); Budkivskyi 53', 55'	Report	Kéthévoama 29'	Stadium: Mardan Stadium; Referee: Ali Akcinar

13 February 2015	Lokomotiv Tashkent (Uzbekistan)	1 – 0	(Kazakhstan) Astana	Antalya, Turkey
(UTC+6)	S.Mirzayev 78'	Report		Stadium: Mardan Stadium; Referee: Denis Shcherbakov

17 February 2015	Volyn Lutsk (Ukraine)	2 – 2	(Kazakhstan) Astana	Antalya, Turkey
(UTC+6)	Matei 45' (pen.), 85' (pen.)	Report	Rodionov 2'; Dzholchiev 80'	Stadium: Mardan Stadium; Referee: Victor Shmusik

16 June 2015	Astana	2 – 1	Bayterek	Astana
(UTC+6)	Nusserbayev; V.Pron	Report	K.Akhmetov	Stadium: Astana Arena

== Competitions ==
=== Kazakhstan Super Cup ===
1 March 2015	Astana	0 – 0 (a.e.t.) (3 – 2 p)	Kairat	Astana
16:00 (UTC+6)	Aničić (yellow card) 87'; Konysbayev (yellow card) 111'	s://int.soccerway.com/matches/2015/03/01/kazakhstan/super-cup/fk-lokomotiv-astana/fc-kairat-almaty/1988133/?ICID=HP_MS_205_01 https://www.sports.kz/online/football/1816 Report]		Stadium: Astana Arena; Attendance: 20,000; Referee: Jonas Eriksson
	Penalties
	Shomko (penalty missed); Aničić (penalty scored); Cañas (penalty scored); Konysbayev (penalty missed); Kéthévoama (penalty missed); Beisebekov (penalty scored)		Darabayev (penalty missed); Marković (penalty missed); Riera (penalty scored); Pliyev (penalty missed); Rudoselskiy (penalty scored); I.Kalinin (penalty missed)

=== Premier League ===
==== Regular season ====
===== Results summary =====
Overall								Home						Away					
Pld	W	D	L	GF	GA	GD	Pts	W	D	L	GF	GA	GD	W	D	L	GF	GA	GD
22	12	7	3	40	19	+21	43	7	4	0	23	9	+14	5	3	3	17	10	+7

Last updated: 20 July 2015.
Source: Soccerway

===== Results by round =====
Round	1	2	3	4	5	6	7	8	9	10	11	12	13	14	15	16	17	18	19	20	21	22
Ground	H	A	H	A	H	A	H	H	A	H	A	H	A	H	A	H	A	A	H	A	H	A
Result	W	W	W	D	D	L	D	W	L	W	W	D	W	D	D	W	W	L	W	D	W	W
Position	2	1	1	1	1	3	4	1	4	3	2	4	2	2	5	3	2	3	3	3	3	3

Source: Soccerway
A = Away; H = Home; W = Win; D = Draw; L = Loss

===== Results =====
7 March 2015 1	Astana	2 – 0	Okzhetpes	Astana
17:00 (UTC+6)	Cañas 37'; Twumasi 59'; Shchotkin (yellow card) 77'; Shomko (red card) 90+3'	s://int.soccerway.com/matches/2015/03/07/kazakhstan/premier-league/fk-lokomotiv-astana/fc-okzhetpes-kokshetau/2010819/	Buleshev (yellow card) 75'; Pawlaw (yellow card) 90+2'	Stadium: Astana Arena; Attendance: 1,500; Referee: Aleksandr Aliyev

11 March 2015 2	Irtysh	0 – 3	Astana	Pavlodar
15:00 (UTC+6)	Loria (yellow card) 49'; Geteriev (yellow card) 90'	s://int.soccerway.com/matches/2015/03/11/kazakhstan/premier-league/fc-irtysh-pavlodar/fk-lokomotiv-astana/2010826/?ICID=HP_MS_79_02	Cañas 15' (pen.); Twumasi 49'; Maksimović 57'	Stadium: Central Stadium; Attendance: 3,000; Referee: Akmalkhan Kholmatov

15 March 2015 3	Astana	2 – 1	Shakhter Karagandy	Astana
17:00 (UTC+6)	Maksimović 31'; Cañas 76'	s://int.soccerway.com/matches/2015/03/15/kazakhstan/premier-league/fk-lokomotiv-astana/fc-shakhter-karagandy/2010829/?ICID=PL_MS_05	Topčagić (yellow card) 3' (goal) 44'; Vošahlík (yellow card) 36'	Stadium: Astana Arena; Attendance: 3,500; Referee: Igor Aleshin

21 March 2015 4	Atyrau	1 – 1	Astana	Atyrau
16:00 (UTC+6)	Baizhanov 63'	s://int.soccerway.com/matches/2015/03/21/kazakhstan/premier-league/fk-atyrau/fk-lokomotiv-astana/2010837/?ICID=PL_MS_04	Nusserbayev (yellow card) 54'; Grigoryev 56' (o.g.); Cañas (yellow card) 61'	Stadium: Munaishy Stadium; Attendance: 2,000; Referee: Aydin Rakhimbayev

5 April 2015 5	Astana	0 – 0	Aktobe	Astana
16:00 (UTC+6)	Konysbayev (yellow card) 41'; Postnikov (yellow card) 49'; Kéthévoama (yellow card) 57'; Cañas (yellow card) 72'	s://int.soccerway.com/matches/2015/04/05/kazakhstan/premier-league/fk-lokomotiv-astana/fk-aktobe-lento/2010845/?ICID=PL_MS_05	Žulpa (yellow card) 39'; Khairullin (yellow card) 45+1'; Shabalin (yellow card) 90+3'	Stadium: Astana Arena; Attendance: 3,000; Referee: Igor Chesnokov

11 April 2015 6	Taraz	2 – 0	Astana	Taraz
16:00 (UTC+6)	Pyschur 28'; D.Bashlay (yellow card) 45' (yellow-red card) 74'; Sergienko 68'	s://int.soccerway.com/matches/2015/04/11/kazakhstan/premier-league/fc-taraz/fk-lokomotiv-astana/2010848/	Akhmetov (yellow card) 41'	Stadium: Central Stadium; Attendance: 5,000; Referee: Artyom Kuchin

15 April 2015 7	Astana	1 – 1	Ordabasy	Astana
19:00 (UTC+6)	Postnikov (yellow card) 9'; Zhukov (yellow card) 57'; Cañas 89'	s://int.soccerway.com/matches/2015/04/15/kazakhstan/premier-league/fk-lokomotiv-astana/fc-ordabasy-shymkent/2010858/	Geynrikh 10' (pen.); Ashirbekov (yellow card) 87'	Stadium: Astana Arena; Attendance: 5,000; Referee: Viktor Antonov

19 April 2015 8	Astana	4 – 3	Kairat	Astana
18:00 (UTC+6)	Zhukov 11'; Maksimović 41'; Beisebekov (yellow card) 45+1'; Aničić (yellow card) 52'; Dzholchiev 69'; Nusserbayev (yellow card) 72' (goal) 82'	s://int.soccerway.com/matches/2015/04/19/kazakhstan/premier-league/fk-lokomotiv-astana/fc-kairat-almaty/2010859/	Gohou 20', 67' (yellow card) 45+1'; Islamkhan 38'	Stadium: Astana Arena; Attendance: 3,500; Referee: Denis Izmailov

25 April 2015 9	Kaisar	2 – 1	Astana	Kyzylorda
15:00 (UTC+6)	Muldarov 9'; Vorogovskiy (yellow card) 29' (yellow-red card) 86'; Mitošević (yellow card) 40'; Moldakaraev 78' (yellow card) 84'	s://int.soccerway.com/matches/2015/04/25/kazakhstan/premier-league/fc-kaisar-kyzylorda/fk-lokomotiv-astana/2010870/?ICID=PL_MS_03	Aničić (yellow card) 39'; Maksimović 70'; Dzholchiev (yellow card) 76'	Stadium: Gany Muratbayev Stadium; Attendance: 3,000; Referee: Anatolyi Vishnichenko

3 May 2015 10	Astana	4 – 0	Tobol	Astana
17:00 (UTC+6)	Shomko 28'; Nusserbayev 31'; Kéthévoama 58'; Dzholchiev 66'; Beisebekov (yellow card) 75'	s://int.soccerway.com/matches/2015/05/03/kazakhstan/premier-league/fk-lokomotiv-astana/fc-tobyl-kostanai/2010872/?ICID=PL_MS_04	Sadownichy (yellow card) 13'; Bugaev (yellow card) 85'	Stadium: Astana Arena; Attendance: 4,000; Referee: Denis Tevyashov

7 May 2015 11	Zhetysu	1 – 3	Astana	Taldykorgan
17:00 (UTC+6)	Despotović 30'; Cvetković (red card) 53'	s://int.soccerway.com/matches/2015/05/07/kazakhstan/premier-league/fc-zhetysu-taldykorgan/fk-lokomotiv-astana/2010881/?ICID=PL_MS_05	Cañas 27'; Twumasi 57'; Beisebekov (yellow card) 77'; Shchotkin 86'	Stadium: Zhetysu Stadium; Attendance: 2,500; Referee: Ruslan Duzmambetov

16 May 2015 12	Astana	2 – 2	Irtysh	Astana
17:00 (UTC+6)	Kéthévoama 4'; Nusserbayev 60'; Cañas (yellow card) 87'	s://int.soccerway.com/matches/2015/05/16/kazakhstan/premier-league/fk-lokomotiv-astana/fc-irtysh-pavlodar/2010886/?ICID=PL_MS_03	Dudchenko 3'; Azuka (yellow card) 50'; G.Sartakov (yellow card) 85'; A.Ersalimov 90'; Aliev (yellow card) 90+4'	Stadium: Astana Arena; Attendance: 3,000; Referee: Bagdat Abdullaev

24 May 2015 13	Shakhter Karagandy	0 – 4	Astana	Karaganda
14:00 (UTC+6)	Najaryan (yellow card) 65'; Sass (yellow card) 88'	s://int.soccerway.com/matches/2015/05/24/kazakhstan/premier-league/fc-shakhter-karagandy/fk-lokomotiv-astana/2010892/?ICID=PL_MS_01	Nusserbayev 11'; Twumasi 14'; Dzholchiev 72'; Shchotkin 90'	Stadium: Shakhter Stadium; Attendance: 3,000; Referee: Aydin Rakhimbayev

29 May 2015 14	Astana	0 – 0	Atyrau	Astana
17:00 (UTC+6)	Akhmetov (yellow card) 37'	s://int.soccerway.com/matches/2015/05/29/kazakhstan/premier-league/fk-lokomotiv-astana/fk-atyrau/2010897/?ICID=PL_MS_01	R.Esatov (yellow card) 22'; Essame (yellow card) 37'; V.Kuzmin (yellow card) 50'; Arzhanov (yellow card) 90+1'; Grigoryev (yellow card) 90+4'	Stadium: Astana Arena; Attendance: 2,500; Referee: Denis Tevyashov

6 June 2015 15	Aktobe	0 – 0	Astana	Aktobe
19:30 (UTC+6)	Miroshnichenko (yellow card) 21'; Mineiro (red card) 89'; Danilo (yellow card) 90+2'	s://int.soccerway.com/matches/2015/06/06/kazakhstan/premier-league/fk-aktobe-lento/fk-lokomotiv-astana/2010905/	Akhmetov (yellow card) 55'; Dzholchiev (yellow card) 59'; Erić (yellow card) 89'; Aničić (yellow card) 89'; Nusserbayev (yellow card) 89'	Stadium: Central Stadium; Attendance: 3,000; Referee: Denis Izmailov

20 June 2015 16	Astana	4 – 1	Taraz	Astana
17:30 (UTC+6)	Nusserbayev 21' (yellow card) 52'; Twumasi (yellow card) 35'; Shchotkin 62'; Dedechko (yellow card) 70'; Postnikov (yellow card) 72'; Zhukov 75'; Kéthévoama 87'; Cañas (yellow card) 90+2'; Aničić (yellow card) 90+4'	s://int.soccerway.com/matches/2015/06/20/kazakhstan/premier-league/fk-lokomotiv-astana/fc-taraz/2010908/?ICID=PL_MS_01	Mukhutdinov (yellow card) 19'; S.Zhumahanov (yellow card) 65'; D.Evstigneev (yellow card) 76'; Dosmagambetov 80' (pen.); M.Togyzbay (yellow card) 83'	Stadium: Astana Arena; Attendance: 2,000; Referee: Viktor Antonov

24 June 2015 17	Ordabasy	0 – 2	Astana	Shymkent
18:00 (UTC+6)		s://int.soccerway.com/matches/2015/06/24/kazakhstan/premier-league/fc-ordabasy-shymkent/fk-lokomotiv-astana/2010918/?ICID=HP_MS_01_01	Twumasi 53', 73'; Akhmetov (yellow card) 66'	Stadium: Kazhimukan Munaitpasov Stadium; Attendance: 3,000; Referee: Askhat Abdanbayev

28 June 2015 18	Kairat	2 – 0	Astana	Almaty
19:30 (UTC+6)	Kuat (yellow card) 14'; Isael 45+1'; Islamkhan 51' (pen.); Serginho (yellow card) 90+1'	s://int.soccerway.com/matches/2015/06/28/kazakhstan/premier-league/fc-kairat-almaty/fk-lokomotiv-astana/2010921/	Nusserbayev (yellow card) 58'; Postnikov (yellow card) 80'	Stadium: Central Stadium; Attendance: 9,500; Referee: Artyom Kuchin

4 July 2015 19	Astana	2 – 0	Kaisar	Astana
20:00 (UTC+6)	R.Rozybakiev 26' (o.g.); Nusserbayev 48'; Beisebekov (yellow card) 75'	s://int.soccerway.com/matches/2015/07/04/kazakhstan/premier-league/fk-lokomotiv-astana/fc-kaisar-kyzylorda/2010926/?ICID=PL_MS_02	R.Rozybakiev (yellow card) 40'; Knežević (yellow card) 41'	Stadium: Astana Arena; Attendance: 3,000; Referee: Bolat Karlibayev

10 July 2015 20	Tobol	1 – 1	Astana	Kostanay
19:00 (UTC+6)	Bugaev 12'; Zyankovich (yellow card) 38'; Sadownichy (yellow card) 45+1'; Yurin (yellow card) 51'; Kalu (yellow card) 65'; Bogdanov (yellow card) 85'; O.Nedashkovsky (yellow card) 90+3'	s://int.soccerway.com/matches/2015/07/10/kazakhstan/premier-league/fc-tobyl-kostanai/fk-lokomotiv-astana/2010931/	Kéthévoama 17'; Postnikov (yellow card) 28'; Zhukov (yellow card) 79'	Stadium: Central Stadium; Attendance: 3,000; Referee: Igor Chesnokov

18 July 2015 21	Astana	2 – 1	Zhetysu	Astana
17:30 (UTC+6)	Dedechko 5'; Maksimović 84'	s://int.soccerway.com/matches/2015/07/18/kazakhstan/premier-league/fk-lokomotiv-astana/fc-zhetysu-taldykorgan/2010938/?ICID=PL_MS_01	Ergashev (yellow card) 26'; Galiakberov 75'; S.Sagyndykov (yellow card) 77'	Stadium: Astana Arena; Attendance: 3,000; Referee: Daniyar Sakhi

25 July 2015 22	Okzhetpes	1 – 2	Astana	Kokshetau
19:00 (UTC+6)	Shabalin (yellow card) 44'; Buleshev 48'	s://int.soccerway.com/matches/2015/07/25/kazakhstan/premier-league/fc-okzhetpes-kokshetau/fk-lokomotiv-astana/2010943/?ICID=HP_MS_122_01	Dedechko (yellow card) 46'; Kabananga 53', 54'; Muzhikov (yellow card) 82'; Akhmetov (yellow card) 86'	Stadium: Okzhetpes Stadium; Attendance: 2,500; Referee: Askhat Abdanbayev

===== League table =====
Pos	Team	Pld	W	D	L	GF	GA	GD	Pts	Qualification
1	Kairat	22	13	5	4	43	14	+29	44	Qualification for the championship round
2	Aktobe	22	12	8	2	27	12	+15	44	Qualification for the championship round
3	Astana	22	12	7	3	40	19	+21	43	Qualification for the championship round
4	Atyrau	22	9	10	3	25	19	+6	37	Qualification for the championship round
5	Ordabasy	22	9	8	5	21	18	+3	35	Qualification for the championship round

Source: UEFA.com, Soccerway
Rules for classification: 1) Points; 2) Matches won; 3) Head-to-head points; 4) Head-to-head matches won; 5) Head-to-head goal difference; 6) Head-to-head goals scored; 7) Head-to-head away goals scored; 8) Goal difference; 9) Goals scored; 10) Away goals scored; 11) Draw.

==== Championship round ====
===== Results summary =====
Overall								Home						Away					
Pld	W	D	L	GF	GA	GD	Pts	W	D	L	GF	GA	GD	W	D	L	GF	GA	GD
10	8	0	2	15	7	+8	24	4	0	1	8	3	+5	4	0	1	7	4	+3

Last updated: 8 November 2015.
Source: Soccerway

===== Results by round =====
Round	1	2	3	4	5	6	7	8	9	10
Ground	A	A	H	A	A	H	A	H	H	H
Result	W	W	L	L	W	W	W	W	W	W
Position	1	2	2	2	2	2	2	1	1	1

Source: Soccerway
A = Away; H = Home; W = Win; D = Draw; L = Loss

===== Results =====
13 August 2015 23	Aktobe	0 – 1	Astana	Aktobe
20:00 (UTC+6)	Tagybergen (yellow card) 51'; Korobkin (yellow card) 77'	s://int.soccerway.com/matches/2015/08/13/kazakhstan/premier-league/fk-aktobe-lento/fk-lokomotiv-astana/2125292/?ICID=PL_MS_01	Zhukov (yellow card) 27'; Shomko (yellow card) 65'; Cañas 81'	Stadium: Central Stadium; Attendance: 12,000; Referee: Igor Aleshin

22 August 2015 24	Astana	Postponed	Atyrau	Astana
(UTC+6)		[		Stadium: Astana Arena

11 September 2015 25	Ordabasy	2 – 3	Astana	Shymkent
17:00 (UTC+6)	E.Tungyshbaev 10'; Kasyanov (yellow card) 25'; Nurgaliev (yellow card) 37'; Junuzović 62'	s://int.soccerway.com/matches/2015/09/11/kazakhstan/premier-league/fc-ordabasy-shymkent/fk-lokomotiv-astana/2125300/?ICID=HP_MS_84_01	Muzhikov 31'; Akhmetov (yellow card) 45' (yellow-red card) 65'; Kabananga 56'; Nusserbayev 90+4'	Stadium: Kazhimukan Munaitpasov Stadium; Attendance: 3,000; Referee: Viktor Antonov

20 September 2015 26	Astana	0 – 1	Kairat	Astana
20:00 (UTC+6)	Twumasi (yellow card) 37'	s://int.soccerway.com/matches/2015/09/20/kazakhstan/premier-league/fk-lokomotiv-astana/fc-kairat-almaty/2125302/	V.Li (yellow card) 29'; Isael 58'; Marković (yellow card) 77'	Stadium: Astana Arena; Attendance: 11,500; Referee: Askhat Abdanbayev

26 September 2015 27	Irtysh	2 – 1	Astana	Pavlodar
16:00 (UTC+6)	N'Diaye 5'; Fonseca (yellow card) 21' (goal) 33'; Kislitsyn (yellow card) 47'	s://int.soccerway.com/matches/2015/09/26/kazakhstan/premier-league/fc-irtysh-pavlodar/fk-lokomotiv-astana/2125304/	Maksimović 51'; Postnikov (yellow card) 56'; Kabananga (yellow card) 69'	Stadium: Central Stadium; Attendance: 4,000; Referee: Igor Chesnokov

4 October 2015 28	Atyrau	0 – 1	Astana	Atyrau
17:00 (UTC+6)	V.Kuzmin (yellow card) 23'; Odibe (yellow card) 53'; Diakate (yellow card) 76'; K.Zarechny (yellow card) 86'	s://int.soccerway.com/matches/2015/10/04/kazakhstan/premier-league/fk-atyrau/fk-lokomotiv-astana/2125308/	Muzhikov (yellow card) 62'; Nusserbayev 80'	Stadium: Munaishy Stadium; Attendance: 2,200; Referee: Artyom Kuchin

17 October 2015 29	Astana	2 – 1	Ordabasy	Astana
17:00 (UTC+6)	Malyi 19' (o.g.); Cañas 58'; Dzholchiev (yellow card) 75'; Nusserbayev (yellow card) 88'	s://int.soccerway.com/matches/2015/10/17/kazakhstan/premier-league/fk-lokomotiv-astana/fc-ordabasy-shymkent/2125310/	E.Tungyshbaev 71'; Kasyanov (yellow card) 88'	Stadium: Astana Arena; Attendance: 3,000; Referee: Bolat Karlibayev

25 October 2015 30	Kairat	0 – 1	Astana	Almaty
18:00 (UTC+6)		s://int.soccerway.com/matches/2015/10/25/kazakhstan/premier-league/fc-kairat-almaty/fk-lokomotiv-astana/2125315/	Nusserbayev 45+2' (yellow card) 90+6'; Dzholchiev (yellow card) 56'	Stadium: Central Stadium; Attendance: 16,000; Referee: Igor Aleshin

28 October 2015 24	Astana	4 – 1	Atyrau	Astana
18:00 (UTC+6)	Cañas 13'; Beisebekov 23'; Nusserbayev 74'; Kabananga 90+2'	s://int.soccerway.com/matches/2015/10/28/kazakhstan/premier-league/fk-lokomotiv-astana/fk-atyrau/2125295/?ICID=HP_MS_80_01	Arzhanov 29'; Fomin (yellow card) 65'	Stadium: Astana Arena; Attendance: 3,000; Referee: Ruslan Duzmambetov

31 October 2015 31	Astana	1 – 0	Irtysh	Astana
15:00 (UTC+6)	Postnikov (yellow card) 26'; Nusserbayev 57'; Muzhikov (yellow card) 70'	s://int.soccerway.com/matches/2015/10/31/kazakhstan/premier-league/fk-lokomotiv-astana/fc-irtysh-pavlodar/2125316/	Geteriev (yellow card) 13'; Chernyshov (yellow card) 37'	Stadium: Astana Arena; Attendance: 2,600; Referee: Askhat Abdanbayev

8 November 2015 32	Astana	1 – 0	Aktobe	Astana
15:00 (UTC+6)	Zhukov (yellow card) 20'; Kabananga 88'	Report	D.Zhalmukan (yellow card) 27'; Adeleye (yellow card) 53'; Mineiro (yellow card) 60'; Korobkin (yellow card) 60'; Khizhnichenko (red card) 85'	Stadium: Astana Arena; Attendance: 8,200; Referee: Viktor Antonov

===== League table =====
Pos	Team	Pld	W	D	L	GF	GA	GD	Pts	Qualification
1	Astana (C)	32	20	7	5	55	26	+29	46	Qualification for the Champions League second qualifying round
2	Kairat	32	20	7	5	60	19	+41	45	Qualification for the Europa League first qualifying round (Note: Kairat qualified for the UEFA Europa League first qualifying round by winning the 2015 Kazakhstan Cup.)
3	Aktobe	32	15	9	8	35	25	+10	32	Qualification for the Europa League first qualifying round
4	Ordabasy	32	12	10	10	32	31	+1	29	Qualification for the Europa League first qualifying round
5	Atyrau	32	11	12	9	31	33	−2	27	
6	Irtysh Pavlodar	32	10	10	12	37	39	−2	25	

Source: Soccerway
Rules for classification: 1) Points; 2) Play-off (only if deciding champion when two teams are tied); 3) Matches won; 4) Head-to-head points; 5) Head-to-head matches won; 6) Head-to-head goal difference; 7) Head-to-head goals scored; 8) Head-to-head away goals scored; 9) Goal difference; 10) Goals scored; 11) Away goals scored; 12) Play-off (only if deciding champion when three or teams are tied); 13) Draw.
(C) Champions

=== Kazakhstan Cup ===
29 April 2015 Second Round	Ekibastuz	2 – 3	Astana	Ekibastuz
15:00 (UTC+6)	Dyusembaev (yellow card) 62' (goal) 90'; T.Aubakirov 69'; Isakov (yellow card) 82'; Bursugurov (yellow card) 90+2'	Report	Twumasi 12', 53'; Shchotkin 35'; Nusserbayev (yellow card) 89'	Stadium: Shakhter Stadium; Attendance: 1,800; Referee: Daniyar Sakhi

20 May 2015 Quarterfinal	Kaisar	1 – 2 (a.e.t.)	Astana	Kyzylorda
18:00 (UTC+6)	Shestakov (yellow card) 38'; Piroska (yellow card) 44'; Junuzović 45'; Klein (yellow card) 94'	s://int.soccerway.com/matches/2015/05/20/kazakhstan/cup/fc-kaisar-kyzylorda/fk-lokomotiv-astana/2033108/?ICID=HP_MS_76_03	Kéthévoama (yellow card) 31'; Akhmetov (yellow card) 57'; Twumasi 69', 110'	Stadium: Gany Muratbayev Stadium; Attendance: 2,000; Referee: Denis Izmailov

2 June 2015 Semifinal 1st leg	Aktobe	0 – 2	Astana	Aktobe
19:00 (UTC+6)	Tagybergen (yellow card) 28'	s://int.soccerway.com/matches/2015/06/02/kazakhstan/cup/fk-aktobe-lento/fk-lokomotiv-astana/2036116/?ICID=HP_MS_34_01	Dzholchiev 19'; B.Kulbekov 33'; Twumasi (yellow card) 72'; Shomko (yellow card) 90+1'	Stadium: Central Stadium; Attendance: 3,000; Referee: Igor Aleshin

23 September 2015 Semifinal 2nd leg	Astana	1 – 1 (3 – 1 agg.)	Aktobe	Astana
18:00 (UTC+6)	Shomko (yellow card) 66'; Twumasi 68'	s://int.soccerway.com/matches/2015/09/23/kazakhstan/cup/fk-lokomotiv-astana/fk-aktobe-lento/2036118/	Mineiro (yellow card) 35'; Khizhnichenko 40'	Stadium: Astana Arena; Attendance: 4,500; Referee: Ruslan Duzmambetov

==== Final ====
21 November 2015	Astana	1 – 2	Kairat	Astana
15:00 (UTC+6)	Shomko (yellow card) 15'; Twumasi 28'	s://int.soccerway.com/matches/2015/11/21/kazakhstan/cup/fk-lokomotiv-astana/fc-kairat-almaty/2075741/	Despotović (yellow card) 44' (goal) 48', 70'; Marković (yellow card) 64'	Stadium: Astana Arena; Attendance: 10,500; Referee: Cüneyt Çakır (Turkey)

=== UEFA Champions League ===
==== Qualifying rounds ====
===== Second qualifying round =====
15 July 2015 First leg	NK Maribor (Slovenia)	1 – 0	(Kazakhstan) Astana	Maribor, Slovenia
00:30 (UTC+6)	Šuler 5'; Kabha (yellow card) 29'; Stojanović (yellow card) 82'; Zahović (yellow card) 86'	https://www.uefa.com/uefachampionsleague/match/2015585--maribor-vs-astana/ Report]	Ilić (yellow card) 9'; Zhukov (yellow card) 78'	Stadium: Ljudski vrt Attendance: 10,458; Referee: Carlos del Cerro Grande (Spain)

22 July 2015 Second leg	Astana (Kazakhstan)	3 – 1 (3 – 2 agg.)	(Slovenia) NK Maribor	Astana, Kazakhstan
20:00 (UTC+6)	Dzholchiev 12'; Cañas 43' (yellow card) 55' (yellow-red card) 67'; Twumasi 58'	https://www.uefa.com/uefachampionsleague/match/2015602--astana-vs-maribor/ Report]	Rajčević 39'; Mertelj (yellow card) 57'; Viler (yellow card) 72'; Bohar (yellow card) 75'; Šuler (yellow card) 82'	Stadium: Astana Arena; Attendance: 23,650; Referee: Adrien Jaccottet (Switzerland)

===== Third qualifying round =====
29 July 2015 First leg	HJK (Finland)	0 – 0	(Kazakhstan) Astana	Helsinki, Finland
22:00 (UTC+6)	Zeneli (yellow card) 33'; Baah (yellow card) 55'	Report	Dzholchiev (yellow card) 35'; Postnikov (yellow card) 79'	Stadium: Sonera Stadium; Attendance: 9,788; Referee: Alexandru Tudor (Romania)

5 August 2015 Second leg	Astana (Kazakhstan)	4 – 3 (4 – 3 agg.)	(Finland) HJK	Astana, Kazakhstan
20:00 (UTC+6)	Twumasi 44' (red card) 71'; Ilić (yellow card) 45+1'; Cañas 47' (pen.); Shomko 56'; Maksimović (yellow card) 90+1'; Postnikov 90+3'	Report	Jallow 4'; Baah 42'; Moren (yellow card) 75'; Zeneli 86' (pen.)	Stadium: Astana Arena; Attendance: 27,937; Referee: Alon Yefet

===== Playoff round =====
18 August 2015 First leg	Astana (Kazakhstan)	1 – 0	(Cyprus) APOEL	Astana, Kazakhstan
22:00 (UTC+6)	Dzholchiev 13'; Shomko (yellow card) 78'	https://www.uefa.com/uefachampionsleague/match/2015645--astana-vs-apoel/ Report]	De Vincenti (yellow card) 14'	Stadium: Astana Arena; Attendance: 30,000; Referee: Viktor Kassai (Hungary)

27 August 2015 Second leg	APOEL (Cyprus)	1 – 1 (1 – 2 agg.)	(Kazakhstan) Astana	Nicosia, Cyprus
00:45 (UTC+6)	De Vincenti (yellow card) 32'; Štilić 60'; Charalambidis (yellow card) 61'; Vander (yellow card) 88'	https://www.uefa.com/uefachampionsleague/match/2015660--apoel-vs-astana/ Report]	Ilić (yellow card) 37'; Shomko (yellow card) 63'; Cañas (yellow card) 71'; Maksimović 84'; Aničić (yellow card) 87'	Stadium: GSP Stadium; Referee: Martin Atkinson (England)

==== Group stage ====
Pos	Team	Pld	W	D	L	GF	GA	GD	Pts	Qualification
1	(Spain) Atlético Madrid	6	4	1	1	11	3	+8	13	Advance to knockout phase
2	(Portugal) Benfica	6	3	1	2	10	8	+2	10	Advance to knockout phase
3	(Turkey) Galatasaray	6	1	2	3	6	10	−4	5	Transfer to Europa League
4	(Kazakhstan) Astana	6	0	4	2	5	11	−6	4	

Source: UEFA
Rules for classification: Group stage tiebreakers

16 September 2015 1	Benfica (Portugal)	2 – 0	(Kazakhstan) Astana	Lisbon, Portugal
00:45 (UTC+6)	Samaris (yellow card) 40'; Guedes (yellow card) 45+1'; Gaitán 51'; Mitroglou 62'; Jardel (yellow card) 83'	https://www.uefa.com/uefachampionsleague/match/2015670--benfica-vs-astana/ Report]	Aničić (yellow card) 21'; Dzholchiev (yellow card) 24'; Zhukov (yellow card) 78'	Stadium: Estádio da Luz; Attendance: 32,799; Referee: Anastasios Sidiropoulos (Greece)

30 September 2015 2	Astana (Kazakhstan)	2 – 2	(Turkey) Galatasaray	Astana, Kazakhstan
22:00 (UTC+6)	Balta 77' (o.g.); Carole 89' (o.g.)	https://www.uefa.com/uefachampionsleague/match/2015693--astana-vs-galatasaray/ Report]	Kısa 31'; İnan (yellow card) 42'; Erić 86' (o.g.); Gümüş (yellow card) 90+1'	Stadium: Astana Arena; Attendance: 27,264; Referee: Martin Strömbergsson (Sweden)

22 October 2015 3	Atlético Madrid (Spain)	4 – 0	(Kazakhstan) Astana	Madrid, Spain
00:45 (UTC+6)	Ñíguez 23'; Martínez 29'; Ó.Torres 63'; Dedechko 89' (o.g.)	https://www.uefa.com/uefachampionsleague/match/2015709--atleti-vs-astana/ Report]	Akhmetov (yellow card) 49'	Stadium: Vicente Calderón; Attendance: 33,853; Referee: Aleksei Kulbakov (Belarus)

3 November 2015 4	Astana (Kazakhstan)	0 – 0	(Spain) Atlético Madrid	Astana, Kazakhstan
21:00 (UTC+6)	Postnikov (yellow card) 44'; Dzholchiev (yellow card) 60'; Zhukov (yellow card) 84'	https://www.uefa.com/uefachampionsleague/match/2015717--astana-vs-atleti/ Report]		Stadium: Astana Arena; Attendance: 29,231; Referee: Anthony Taylor (England)

25 November 2015 5	Astana (Kazakhstan)	2 – 2	(Portugal) Benfica	Astana, Kazakhstan
21:00 (UTC+6)	Twumasi 19'; Aničić 31'; Cañas (yellow card) 80'; Shchotkin (yellow card) 90+4'	https://www.uefa.com/uefachampionsleague/match/2015742--astana-vs-benfica/ Report]	Jiménez (yellow card) 22' (goal) 40', 72'; López (yellow card) 44'; Jonas (yellow card) 48'	Stadium: Astana Arena; Attendance: 15,089; Referee: Ruddy Buquet (France)

9 December 2015 6	Galatasaray (Turkey)	1 – 1	(Kazakhstan) Astana	Istanbul, Turkey
01:45 (UTC+6)	İnan 64'; Yılmaz (yellow card) 90'	https:/www.uefa.com/uefachampionsleague/season=2016/matches/round=2000634/match=2015749/index.html Report]	Muzhikov (yellow card) 49'; Twumasi (yellow card) 60' (goal) 62'	Stadium: Türk Telekom Arena; Attendance: 26,464; Referee: Craig Thomson (Scotland)

== Squad statistics ==
As of Match played 9 December 2015

=== Appearances and goals ===
No.	Pos	Nat	Player	Total		Premier League		Kazakhstan Cup		Kazakhstan Super Cup		UEFA Champions League	
No.	Pos	Nat	Player	Apps	Goals	Apps	Goals	Apps	Goals	Apps	Goals	Apps	Goals
1	GK	(Kazakhstan) KAZ	Nenad Erić	39	0	25	0	3	0	1	0	10	0
2	DF	(Kazakhstan) KAZ	Yeldos Akhmetov	21	0	14+2	0	4	0	0	0	1	0
5	DF	(Bosnia and Herzegovina) BIH	Marin Aničić	44	1	28+1	0	3	0	1	0	11	1
6	MF	(Serbia) SRB	Nemanja Maksimović	38	7	18+5	6	2+1	0	1	0	11	1
7	MF	(Kazakhstan) KAZ	Serikzhan Muzhikov	18	1	6+3	1	2	0	0	0	4+3	0
8	MF	(Kazakhstan) KAZ	Georgy Zhukov	43	2	25+2	2	2+2	0	0+1	0	8+3	0
9	FW	(Kazakhstan) KAZ	Aleksey Shchotkin	32	4	7+13	3	3+1	1	0+1	0	1+6	0
10	MF	(Central African Republic) CAF	Foxi Kéthévoama	48	4	28+3	4	3+1	0	1	0	9+3	0
12	DF	(Kazakhstan) KAZ	Igor Pikalkin	8	0	4	0	3	0	0	0	0+1	0
15	MF	(Kazakhstan) KAZ	Abzal Beisebekov	42	1	26+2	1	3+2	0	1	0	1+7	0
17	FW	(Kazakhstan) KAZ	Tanat Nusserbayev	38	11	17+9	11	2+1	0	1	0	6+2	0
19	FW	(Kazakhstan) KAZ	Aleksey Rodionov	2	0	0+1	0	0	0	1	0	0	0
20	MF	(Kazakhstan) KAZ	Zhakyp Kozhamberdy	1	0	0	0	0	0	0	0	0+1	0
22	FW	(Kazakhstan) KAZ	Bauyrzhan Dzholchiev	40	6	20+6	3	3	1	1	0	9+1	2
23	FW	(Ghana) GHA	Patrick Twumasi	40	16	23+5	6	4+1	6	1	0	6	4
24	MF	(Ukraine) UKR	Denys Dedechko	16	1	5+5	1	1	0	0	0	1+4	0
28	DF	(Kazakhstan) KAZ	Birjan Kulbekov	9	1	0+5	0	2+1	1	0	0	0+1	0
33	DF	(Slovenia) SLO	Branko Ilić	21	0	8+1	0	0	0	0	0	12	0
40	GK	(Kazakhstan) KAZ	Mikhail Golubnichi	7	0	6	0	1	0	0	0	0	0
44	DF	(Russia) RUS	Yevgeny Postnikov	46	1	28	0	4+1	0	1	0	12	1
77	DF	(Kazakhstan) KAZ	Dmitri Shomko	42	2	24+1	1	4+1	0	1	0	11	1
85	GK	(Kazakhstan) KAZ	Vladimir Loginovskiy	5	0	1+1	0	1	0	0	0	2	0
88	MF	(Colombia) COL	Roger Cañas	43	10	30	8	2	0	1	0	10	2
89	FW	(Democratic Republic of the Congo) COD	Junior Kabananga	25	5	6+7	5	0+2	0	0	0	6+4	0
Players away from Astana on loan:
7	MF	(Kazakhstan) KAZ	Ulan Konysbayev	16	0	3+9	0	3	0	0+1	0	0	0
25	FW	(Kazakhstan) KAZ	Toktar Zhangylyshbay	5	0	0+4	0	1	0	0	0	0	0
Players who appeared for Astana that left during the season:
13	DF	(Kazakhstan) KAZ	Berik Shaikhov	1	0	0+1	0	0	0	0	0	0	0
16	MF	(Kazakhstan) KAZ	Vladislav Mendybayev	1	0	1	0	0	0	0	0	0	0

=== Goal scorers ===
Place	Position	Nation	Number	Name	Premier League	Kazakhstan Cup	Kazakhstan Super Cup	UEFA Champions League	Total
1	FW	(Ghana)	23	Patrick Twumasi	6	6	0	4	16
2	FW	(Kazakhstan)	17	Tanat Nusserbayev	11	0	0	0	11
2	MF	(Colombia)	88	Roger Cañas	8	0	0	2	10
4	MF	(Serbia)	6	Nemanja Maksimović	6	0	0	1	7
5	FW	(Kazakhstan)	22	Bauyrzhan Dzholchiev	3	1	0	2	6
6	FW	(Democratic Republic of the Congo)	89	Junior Kabananga	5	0	0	0	5
6				Own goal	3	0	0	2	5
8	MF	(Central African Republic)	10	Foxi Kéthévoama	4	0	0	0	4
8	FW	(Kazakhstan)	9	Aleksey Shchotkin	3	1	0	0	4
10	MF	(Kazakhstan)	8	Georgy Zhukov	2	0	0	0	2
10	DF	(Kazakhstan)	77	Dmitri Shomko	1	0	0	1	2
11	MF	(Ukraine)	24	Denys Dedechko	1	0	0	0	1
11	MF	(Kazakhstan)	7	Serikzhan Muzhikov	1	0	0	0	1
11	MF	(Kazakhstan)	15	Abzal Beisebekov	1	0	0	0	1
11	DF	(Kazakhstan)	28	Birjan Kulbekov	0	1	0	0	1
11	DF	(Russia)	44	Yevgeny Postnikov	0	0	0	1	1
11	DF	(Bosnia and Herzegovina)	5	Marin Aničić	0	0	0	1	1
				TOTALS	55	9	0	14	78

=== Clean sheets ===
Place	Position	Nation	Number	Name	Premier League	Kazakhstan Cup	Kazakhstan Super Cup	UEFA Champions League	Total
1	GK	(Kazakhstan)	1	Nenad Erić	12	1	1	3	17
1	GK	(Kazakhstan)	40	Mikhail Golubnichi	2	0	0	0	2
				TOTALS	14	1	1	3	19

=== Disciplinary record ===
Number	Nation	Position	Name	Premier League		Kazakhstan Cup		Kazakhstan Super Cup		UEFA Champions League		Total	
Number	Nation	Position	Name	Yellow card	Red card	Yellow card	Red card	Yellow card	Red card	Yellow card	Red card	Yellow card	Red card
1	(Kazakhstan)	GK	Nenad Erić	1	0	0	0	0	0	0	0	1	0
2	(Kazakhstan)	DF	Yeldos Akhmetov	5	1	1	0	0	0	1	0	7	1
5	(Bosnia and Herzegovina)	DF	Marin Aničić	5	0	0	0	1	0	2	0	8	0
6	(Serbia)	MF	Nemanja Maksimović	0	0	0	0	0	0	1	0	1	0
7	(Kazakhstan)	MF	Serikzhan Muzhikov	3	0	0	0	0	0	1	0	4	0
8	(Kazakhstan)	MF	Georgy Zhukov	4	0	0	0	0	0	3	0	7	0
9	(Kazakhstan)	FW	Aleksey Shchetkin	1	0	0	0	0	0	1	0	2	0
10	(Central African Republic)	MF	Foxi Kéthévoama	1	0	1	0	0	0	0	0	2	0
15	(Kazakhstan)	MF	Abzal Beisebekov	4	0	0	0	0	0	0	0	4	0
17	(Kazakhstan)	FW	Tanat Nusserbayev	7	0	1	0	0	0	0	0	8	0
22	(Kazakhstan)	FW	Bauyrzhan Dzholchiev	4	0	0	0	0	0	3	0	7	0
23	(Ghana)	FW	Patrick Twumasi	2	0	1	0	0	0	1	0	4	0
24	(Ukraine)	MF	Denys Dedechko	2	0	0	0	0	0	0	0	2	0
33	(Slovenia)	DF	Branko Ilić	0	0	0	0	0	0	3	0	3	0
44	(Russia)	DF	Yevgeny Postnikov	7	0	0	0	0	0	2	0	9	0
77	(Kazakhstan)	DF	Dmitri Shomko	1	1	3	0	0	0	2	0	6	1
88	(Colombia)	MF	Roger Cañas	4	0	0	0	0	0	4	1	8	1
89	(Democratic Republic of the Congo)	FW	Junior Kabananga	1	0	0	0	0	0	0	0	1	0
Players away on loan:
7	(Kazakhstan)	MF	Ulan Konysbayev	2	0	0	0	1	0	0	0	3	0
			TOTALS	54	2	7	0	2	0	24	1	87	3
