= Georgy Zhukov (footballer) =

Kazakh footballer

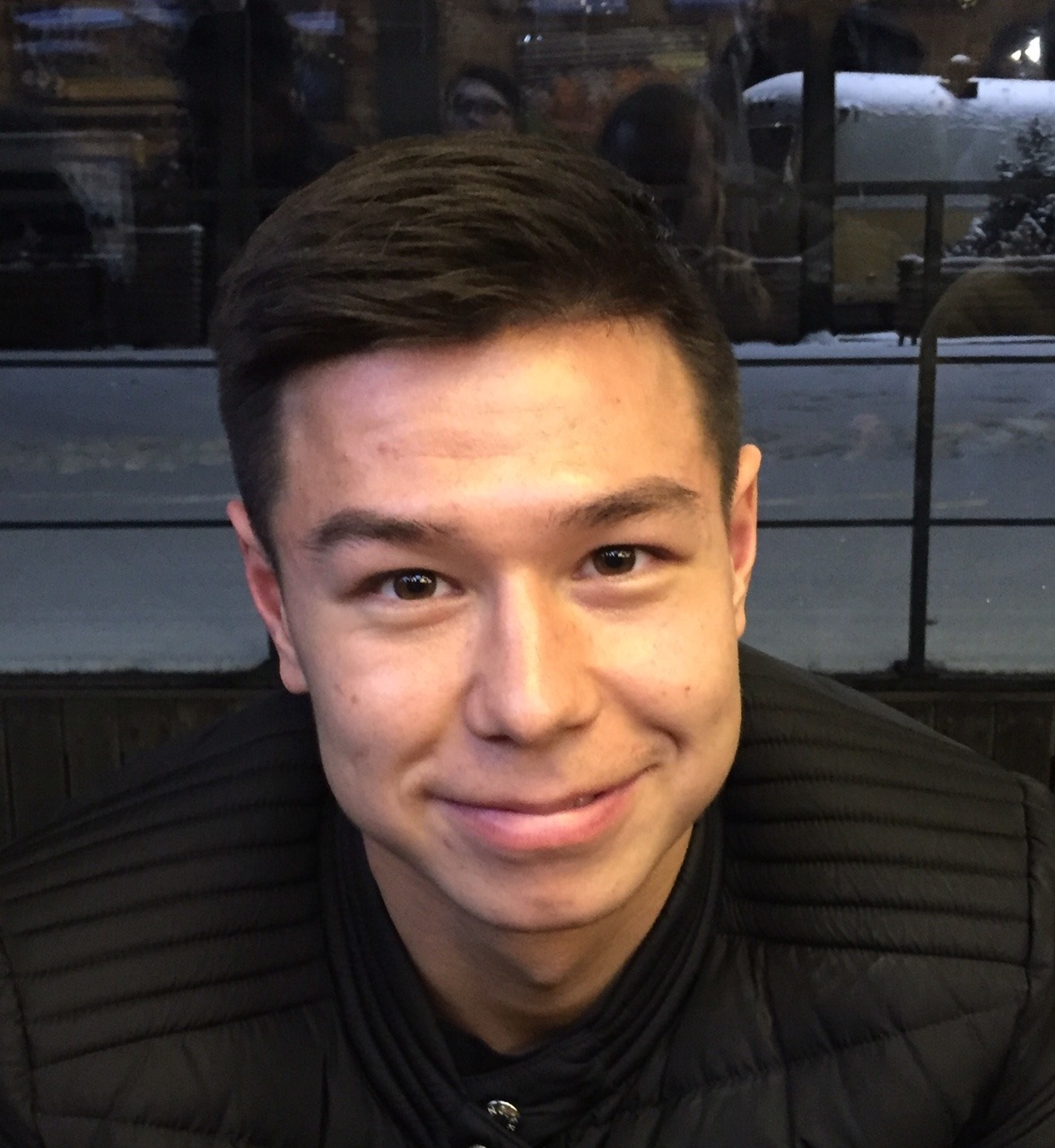
- Zhukov in 2018

Personal information
- Full name: Georgy Gennadyevich Zhukov
- Date of birth: 19 November 1994 (age 31)
- Place of birth: Semipalatinsk, Kazakhstan
- Height: 1.72 m (5 ft 7 1/2 in)
- Position: Midfielder

Team information
- Current team: Aktobe
- Number: 20

Senior career*
Years	Team	Apps	(Gls)
2010–2013	Beerschot	4	(0)
2013–2016	Standard Liège	0	(0)
2014–2015	→ Astana (loan)	39	(2)
2016	→ Roda JC (loan)	16	(1)
2016	Ural Yekaterinburg	4	(0)
2017–2019	Kairat	69	(5)
2020–2022	Wisła Kraków	56	(1)
2022–2024	Cangzhou Mighty Lions	66	(2)
2025	Puszcza Niepołomice	9	(0)
2025–	Aktobe	34	(0)

International career^{‡}
2013	Belgium U19	3	(0)
2014–2015	Kazakhstan U21	6	(0)
2015–	Kazakhstan	28	(0)
- * Club domestic league appearances and goals as of 1 November 2026 ‡ National team caps and goals as of 8 October 2026

Georgy Gennadyevich Zhukov (Russian: Георгий Геннадьевич Жуков; born 19 November 1994) is a Kazakh professional footballer who plays as a midfielder for Kazakhstan Premier League club Aktobe and the Kazakhstan national team.

== Club career ==
On 27 January 2014, Zhukov joined Kazakhstan Premier League side FC Astana on a year-long loan deal.

On 5 December 2016, Zhukov signed a three-year contract with Kazakhstan Premier League side FC Kairat.

On 27 November 2019, Wisła Kraków announced the signing of Zhukov effective as of 1 January 2020.

== International career ==
Zhukov was born in Kazakhstan, but emigrated to Belgium as a child and was eligible for both teams. As a youth, he played for the Belgium U19s, but later switched to Kazakhstan. He played for the Kazakh youth teams, before making his debut for the senior team in a friendly 0–0 tie against the Russian national team on 31 March 2015.

== Career statistics ==
=== Club ===
As of match played 1 November 2026

Appearances and goals by club, season and competition
Club	Season	League			National cup (Note: Includes Kazakhstan Cup, KNVB Cup, Russian Cup, Polish Cup, Chinese FA Cup)		Continental		Other		Total	
Club	Season	Division	Apps	Goals	Apps	Goals	Apps	Goals	Apps	Goals	Apps	Goals
Beerschot	2011–12	Belgium Pro League	0	0	0	0	—		—		0	0
Beerschot	2012–13	Belgium Pro League	3	0	0	0	—		—		3	0
Beerschot	Total		3	0	0	0	—		—		3	0
Astana (loan)	2014	Kazakhstan Premier League	12	0	3	0	8 (Note: Appearance(s) in UEFA Europa League)	0	—		23	0
Astana (loan)	2015	Kazakhstan Premier League	27	2	4	0	12 (Note: Appearances in UEFA Champions League)	0	1 (Note: Appearance in Kazakhstan Super Cup)	0	44	2
Astana (loan)	Total		39	2	7	0	20	0	1	0	67	2
Roda JC (loan)	2015–16	Eredivisie	16	1	1	0	—		—		17	1
Ural Yekaterinburg	2016–17	Russian Premier League	4	0	2	0	—		—		6	0
Kairat	2017	Kazakhstan Premier League	23	1	4	1	1	0	1	0	29	2
Kairat	2018	Kazakhstan Premier League	20	2	4	0	4	0	1	0	29	2
Kairat	2019	Kazakhstan Premier League	26	2	0	0	4	0	0	0	30	2
Kairat	Total		69	5	8	1	9	0	2	0	88	6
Wisła Kraków	2019–20	Ekstraklasa	13	0	0	0	—		—		13	0
Wisła Kraków	2020–21	Ekstraklasa	25	0	1	0	—		—		26	0
Wisła Kraków	2021–22	Ekstraklasa	18	1	3	0	—		—		21	1
Wisła Kraków	Total		56	1	4	0	—		—		60	1
Cangzhou Mighty Lions	2022	Chinese Super League	16	0	3	0	—		—		19	0
Cangzhou Mighty Lions	2023	Chinese Super League	27	1	0	0	—		—		27	1
Cangzhou Mighty Lions	2024	Chinese Super League	23	1	0	0	—		—		23	1
Cangzhou Mighty Lions	Total		66	2	3	0	—		—		69	2
Puszcza Niepołomice	2024–25	Ekstraklasa	9	0	2	0	—		—		11	0
Aktobe	2025	Kazakhstan Premier League	10	0	0	0	4 (Note: two appearances in Europa League and two in Conference League)	0	—		14	0
Aktobe	2026	Kazakhstan Premier League	24	0	2	0	—		—		26	0
Aktobe	Total		34	0	2	0	4	0	—		40	0
Career total			296	11	29	1	33	0	3	0	361	12

=== International ===
As of match played 5 October 2026

Appearances and goals by national team and year
National team	Year	Apps	Goals
Kazakhstan
Kazakhstan	2015	2	0
Kazakhstan	2017	3	0
Kazakhstan	2018	5	0
Kazakhstan	2019	5	0
Kazakhstan	2021	5	0
Kazakhstan	2022	1	0
Kazakhstan	2025	6	0
Kazakhstan	2026	1	0
Total		28	0

== Honours ==
Astana

- Kazakhstan Premier League: 2014, 2015
- Kazakhstan Super Cup: 2015

Kairat

- Kazakhstan Cup: 2017, 2018
- Kazakhstan Super Cup: 2017
