= Tanat Nuserbayev =

Kazakhstani footballer (born 1987)

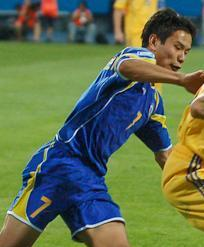

Personal information
- Full name: Tanat Akimzhanuly Nuserbayev
- Date of birth: 1 January 1987 (age 39)
- Place of birth: Shymkent, Kazakh SSR, Soviet Union
- Height: 1.78 m (5 ft 10 in)
- Positions: Right winger; forward

Senior career*
Years	Team	Apps	(Gls)
2006–2010	Ordabasy	99	(13)
2011–2016	Astana	151	(46)
2017–2018	Ordabasy	22	(9)
2018	→ Tobol (loan)	25	(7)
2019	Okzhetpes	14	(5)
2020–2023	Turan		

International career^{‡}
2007–2009	Kazakhstan U21	2	(2)
2008–2023	Kazakhstan	28	(3)
- * Club domestic league appearances and goals as of 3 May 2021 ‡ National team caps and goals as of 22 November 2017

Tanat Akimzhanuly Nuserbayev (Kazakh: Таңат Әкімжанұлы Нөсербаев, Tañat Äkımjanūly Nöserbaev; born 1 January 1987) is a Kazakh former professional footballer who played as a right winger or forward.

== Career ==
=== Club ===
After six-season at FC Astana, Nuserbayev was released by the club on 25 December 2016. Upon leaving Astana, Nuserbayev was the club's all-time top goalscorer with 54 goals, and was ranked second for number of appearances with 195. He re-signed for FC Ordabasy on 19 January 2017.

On 28 March 2018, Nuserbayev joined FC Tobol on a season-long loan deal.

On 13 March 2019 Nuserbayev joined FC Okzhetpes.

=== International ===
Tanat made his U21 debut on 19 August 2008 against the Poland U21s in a 3–0 win, scoring a brace. His senior national team debut match was against England on 11 October 2008 at Wembley Stadium. Nuserbayev scored his first international goal away to Ukraine, in a 2–1 defeat, on 10 June 2009.

== Career statistics ==
=== Club ===
As of match played 10 November 2019.

Club	Season	League			National Cup		Continental		Other		Total	
Club	Season	Division	Apps	Goals	Apps	Goals	Apps	Goals	Apps	Goals	Apps	Goals
Ordabasy	2006	Kazakhstan Premier League	23	0			-		-		23	0
Ordabasy	2007	Kazakhstan Premier League	24	0			-		-		24	0
Ordabasy	2008	Kazakhstan Premier League	27	6			-		-		27	6
Ordabasy	2009	Kazakhstan Premier League	20	7			-		-		20	7
Ordabasy	2010	Kazakhstan Premier League	5	0			-		-		5	0
Astana	2011	Kazakhstan Premier League	25	7	1	0	-		0	0	26	7
Astana	2012	Kazakhstan Premier League	26	10	5	1	-		-		31	11
Astana	2013	Kazakhstan Premier League	24	6	2	1	2	0	1	0	29	7
Astana	2014	Kazakhstan Premier League	26	6	3	1	8	3	-		37	10
Astana	2015	Kazakhstan Premier League	25	11	3	0	8	0	1	0	37	11
Astana	2016	Kazakhstan Premier League	25	6	3	2	6	0	1	0	35	8
Astana	Total		151	46	17	5	24	3	3	0	195	54
Ordabasy	2017	Kazakhstan Premier League	22	9	1	0	1	0	-		24	9
Ordabasy	2018	Kazakhstan Premier League	0	0	0	0	-		-		0	0
Ordabasy	Ordabasy Total		121	22	1	0	1	0	-	-	123	22
Tobol (loan)	2018	Kazakhstan Premier League	25	7	1	1	4	0	-		30	8
Okzhetpes	2019	Kazakhstan Premier League	14	5	1	0	-		-		15	5
Turan	2020	Kazakhstan First Division	0	0	0	0	-		-		0	0
Turan	2021	Kazakhstan Premier League	8	1	0	0	-		-		8	1
Turan	Total				0	0	-	-	-	-		
Career total			319	79	20	6	29	3	3	0	371	88

=== International ===
As of match played 22 March 2017.

National team	Year	Apps	Goals
Kazakhstan	2008	1	0
Kazakhstan	2009	6	1
Kazakhstan	2010	0	0
Kazakhstan	2011	2	0
Kazakhstan	2012	5	0
Kazakhstan	2013	1	0
Kazakhstan	2014	5	1
Kazakhstan	2015	4	0
Kazakhstan	2016	1	0
Kazakhstan	2017	1	1
Total		25	2

=== International goals ===
#	Date	Venue	Opponent	Score	Result	Competition
1	10 June 2009	Olimpiyskyi National Sports Complex, Kyiv, Ukraine	Ukraine	0–1	2–1	FIFA World Cup qualification
2	5 September 2014	Astana Arena, Astana, Kazakhstan	Kyrgyzstan	2–0	7–1	Friendly
3	22 March 2017	GSP Stadium, Nicosia, Cyprus	Cyprus	1–0	1–3	Friendly

== Honours ==
=== Club ===
Astana

- Kazakhstan Premier League (3): 2014, 2015, 2016
- Kazakhstan Cup (2): 2012, 2016
- Kazakhstan Super Cup (2): 2011, 2015
