= Yevgeny Postnikov =

Russian-born Kazakhstani footballer

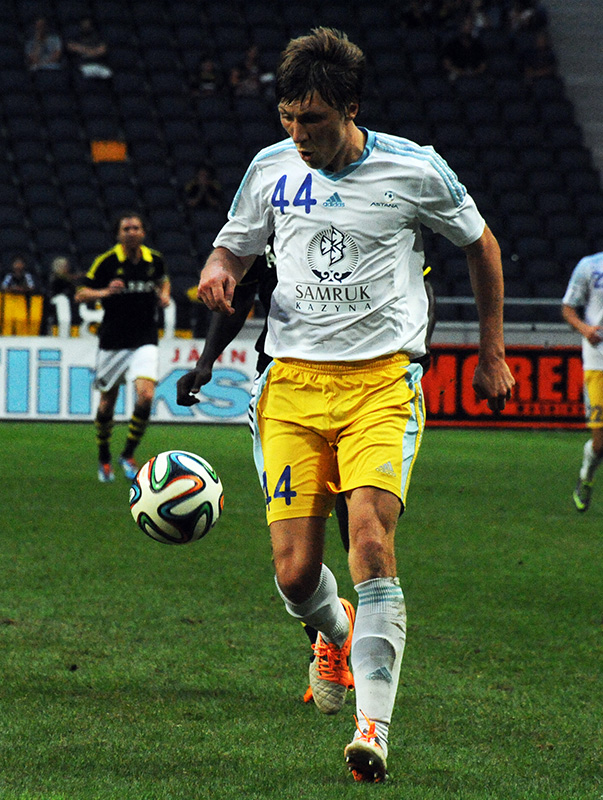
- Postnikov playing for FC Astana in a match against AIK on 7 August 2014

Personal information
- Full name: Yevgeny Ivanovich Postnikov
- Date of birth: 16 April 1986 (age 40)
- Place of birth: Stary Oskol, Belgorod Oblast, Russian SFSR
- Height: 1.89 m (6 ft 2 in)
- Position: Defender

Youth career
- 2002–2003: FC Oskol

Senior career*
Years	Team	Apps	(Gls)
2004–2005	Dynamo Moscow	0	(0)
2006–2007	Daugava Daugavpils	19	(0)
2008–2009	Zodiak-Oskol Stary Oskol	47	(3)
2009–2010	Torpedo-ZIL Moscow	15	(1)
2010–2011	Ventspils	47	(4)
2012–2013	Shakhtyor Soligorsk	59	(3)
2014–2021	Astana	149	(2)
2016	→ Ventspils (loan)	8	(1)

International career
2018–2019	Kazakhstan	8	(0)
- * Club domestic league appearances and goals

Yevgeny Ivanovich Postnikov (Russian: Евгений Иванович Постников; born 16 April 1986) is a Russian-born Kazakhstani former professional footballer.

== Career ==
In February 2014, Postnikov went on trial with both Irtysh Pavlodar and Astana, going on to sign a contract with Astana in March 2014, whilst also taking Kazakhstani citizenship. On 24 August 2016, Astana announced that before Postnikov was loaned to FK Ventspils, he had signed a new contract with the club. On 17 February 2021, Postnikov left Astana after his contract was terminated by mutual consent.

== Career statistics ==
As of Match played 30 November 2020

Appearances and goals by club, season and competition
Club	Season	League			National Cup		Continental		Other		Total	
Club	Season	Division	Apps	Goals	Apps	Goals	Apps	Goals	Apps	Goals	Apps	Goals
Ventspils	2010	LMT Virslīga	18	1			2	0	–		20	1
Ventspils	2011	LMT Virslīga	28	3	3	0	4	0	–		35	3
Ventspils	Total		46	4	3	0	6	0	-	-	55	4
Shakhtyor Soligorsk	2012	Belarusian Premier League	30	1	2	0	2	0	-		34	1
Shakhtyor Soligorsk	2013	Belarusian Premier League	29	2	2	0	2	0	-		33	2
Shakhtyor Soligorsk	Total		59	3	4	0	4	0	-	-	67	3
Astana	2014	KPL	14	0	3	0	7	0	-		24	0
Astana	2015	KPL	28	0	5	0	12	1	1	0	46	1
Astana	2016	KPL	16	0	1	0	0	0	1	0	18	0
Astana	2017	KPL	28	1	1	0	9	0	1	0	39	1
Astana	2018	KPL	19	0	0	0	14	1	1	0	35	1
Astana	2019	KPL	31	1	0	0	14	1	1	0	46	2
Astana	2020	KPL	13	0	0	0	1	0	1	0	15	0
Astana	Total		149	2	10	0	58	3	6	0	223	5
Ventspils (loan)	2016	LMT Virslīga	8	1	0	0	–		–		8	1
Career total			262	10	17	0	68	3	6	0	353	13

=== International ===
Kazakhstan national team
Year	Apps	Goals
2018	7	0
2019	1	0
Total	8	0

Statistics accurate as of match played 21 March 2019

== Honours ==
Ventspils

- LMT Virslīga (1): 2011
- Latvian Cup (1): 2010–11

Astana

- Kazakhstan Premier League (4): 2014, 2015, 2016, 2017
- Kazakhstan Super Cup (1): 2015
