= Roger Cañas =

Colombian footballer (born 1990)

Personal information
- Full name: Roger Cañas Henao
- Date of birth: 27 March 1990 (age 36)
- Place of birth: Medellín, Colombia
- Height: 1.88 m (6 ft 2 in)
- Position: Defensive midfielder

Team information
- Current team: Shakhter Karagandy
- Number: 88

Youth career
- Independiente Medellín

Senior career*
| Years | Team | Apps | (Gls) |
| 2008–2010 | Independiente Medellín | 29 | (0) |
| 2010 | Tranzit | 4 | (1) |
| 2010–2011 | Sibir Novosibirsk | 21 | (0) |
| 2011 | → Jagiellonia Białystok (loan) | 0 | (0) |
| 2012–2013 | Shakhter Karagandy | 52 | (7) |
| 2014–2017 | Astana | 91 | (12) |
| 2017 | → APOEL (loan) | 13 | (1) |
| 2017 | Ordabasy | 12 | (0) |
| 2018 | Shakhtyor Soligorsk | 16 | (0) |
| 2019 | Irtysh Pavlodar | 15 | (3) |
| 2021 | Barnechea | 15 | (1) |
| 2022–2024 | Shakhter Karagandy | 70 | (6) |
- * Club domestic league appearances and goals as of 16 November 2024

Roger Cañas Henao (born 27 March 1990) is a Colombian professional footballer who plays as a defensive midfielder.

== Career ==
=== Tranzit ===
After playing for Tranzit during the first half of 2010, Cañas was close to signing for Serie A side Udinese Calcio during the summer, but following a poor World Cup for Italy, the Italian Football Federation changed the limitations on foreign players, meaning Udinese could only sign one non-eu player that season.

=== Jagiellonia Białystok ===
In August 2011, he was loaned to Jagiellonia Białystok on a one-year deal.

=== Shakhter Karagandy ===
In January 2012, Cañas signed for Kazakhstan Premier League side FC Shakhter Karagandy.

=== Astana ===
In January 2014 Cañas signed for Metalurh Donetsk, however Cañas never played for Metalurh Donetsk as he was released by the club at the beginning of February after medical test showed the presence of only one kidney. Cañas then went on to sign a two-year contract with FC Astana on 2 February 2014. On 24 August 2016, Cañas signed a new contract with the club until the end of the 2018 season.

==== Loan to APOEL ====
On 30 January 2017, Cañas moved on loan to the Cypriot side APOEL FC until the end of the 2016–17 season. He made his official debut on 11 February 2017, coming on as a 77th-minute substitute in APOEL's 1–0 away victory against Karmiotissa for the Cypriot First Division. He scored his first goal for APOEL on 20 March 2017, netting the second goal in his team's 2–0 home victory against AEL Limassol for the Cypriot First Division.

=== Ordabasy ===
On 21 July 2017, Cañas signed for Kazakhstan Premier League side Ordabasy .

=== Shakhtyor Soligorsk ===
On 17 February 2018, Shakhtyor Soligorsk announced the signing of Cañas on a one-year contract.

=== Irtysh Pavlodar ===
On 23 January 2019, Irtysh Pavlodar announced the signing of Cañas. On 3 July 2019, Cañas was released by Irtysh Pavlodar.

== Career statistics ==
As of match played 6 November 2022

Appearances and goals by club, season and competition
| Club | Season | League | | | National Cup | | Continental | | Other | | Total | |
| Club | Season | Division | Apps | Goals | Apps | Goals | Apps | Goals | Apps | Goals | Apps | Goals |
|---|---|---|---|---|---|---|---|---|---|---|---|---|
| Independiente Medellín | 2009 | Primera A | 29 | 0 | 0 | 0 | 4 | 0 | — | | 33 | 0 |
| Tranzit | 2010 | LMT Virslīga | 4 | 1 | 0 | 0 | — | | — | | 4 | 1 |
| Sibir Novosibirsk | 2010 | RPL | 14 | 0 | 1 | 0 | 2 | 0 | — | | 17 | 0 |
| Sibir Novosibirsk | 2011–12 | RNFL | 7 | 0 | 1 | 0 | — | | — | | 8 | 0 |
| Sibir Novosibirsk | Total | | 21 | 0 | 2 | 0 | 2 | 0 | — | | 25 | 0 |
| Jagiellonia Białystok (loan) | 2011–12 | Ekstraklasa | 0 | 0 | 1 | 0 | – | | — | | 1 | 0 |
| Shakhter Karagandy | 2012 | KPL | 26 | 3 | 4 | 1 | 2 | 0 | 1 | 0 | 33 | 5 |
| Shakhter Karagandy | 2013 | KPL | 26 | 4 | 4 | 0 | 12 | 2 | 1 | 0 | 43 | 6 |
| Shakhter Karagandy | Total | | 52 | 7 | 8 | 1 | 14 | 2 | 2 | 0 | 76 | 11 |
| Astana | 2014 | KPL | 30 | 3 | 2 | 0 | 7 | 1 | — | | 39 | 4 |
| Astana | 2015 | KPL | 30 | 8 | 2 | 0 | 10 | 2 | 1 | 0 | 43 | 10 |
| Astana | 2016 | KPL | 31 | 1 | 2 | 1 | 11 | 0 | 1 | 0 | 45 | 2 |
| Astana | 2017 | KPL | 0 | 0 | 0 | 0 | 0 | 0 | 0 | 0 | 0 | 0 |
| Astana | Total | | 91 | 12 | 6 | 1 | 28 | 3 | 2 | 0 | 127 | 16 |
| APOEL (loan) | 2016–17 | Cypriot First Division | 13 | 1 | 2 | 0 | — | | — | | 15 | 1 |
| Ordabasy | 2017 | KPL | 12 | 0 | 0 | 0 | 0 | 0 | — | | 12 | 0 |
| Shakhtyor Soligorsk | 2018 | BPL | 16 | 0 | 1 | 0 | 1 | 0 | — | | 18 | 0 |
| Irtysh Pavlodar | 2019 | KPL | 15 | 3 | 2 | 1 | — | | — | | 17 | 4 |
| Barnechea | 2021 | Campeonato Primera B | 15 | 1 | 1 | 0 | — | | — | | 16 | 1 |
| Shakhter Karagandy | 2022 | KPL | 25 | 2 | 5 | 1 | — | | — | | 30 | 3 |
| Career total | | | 293 | 27 | 27 | 3 | 49 | 5 | 4 | 0 | 374 | 36 |

== Honours ==
Independiente Medellín

- Categoría Primera A: 2009

Shakhter Karagandy

- Kazakhstan Premier League: 2012
- Kazakhstan Cup: 2013
- Kazakhstan Super Cup: 2013

Astana

- Kazakhstan Premier League: 2014, 2015, 2016
- Kazakhstan Cup: 2016
- Kazakhstan Super Cup: 2015

APOEL

- Cypriot First Division: 2016–17
