= Aleksey Rodionov =

Kazakhstani footballer (born 1994)

Personal information
- Full name: Aleksey Olegovich Rodionov
- Date of birth: 29 March 1994 (age 32)
- Place of birth: Kazakhstan
- Height: 1.83 m (6 ft 0 in)
- Position: Striker

Youth career
- 2009–2012: Olé Brasil
- 2012–2014: Atyrau

Senior career*
| Years | Team | Apps | (Gls) |
| 2013–2014 | Atyrau | 5 | (0) |
| 2015–2017 | Astana | 1 | (0) |
| 2018–2021 | Atyrau | 67 | (5) |
| 2022 | Alashkert | 7 | (0) |
- * Club domestic league appearances and goals

Aleksey Olegovich Rodionov (Russian: Алексей Родионовв; born 29 March 1994) is a Kazakhstani former footballer who played as a striker.

== Early life ==
Rodionov was born in 1994 in Kazakhstan. He attended School No. 3 in Kazakhstan.

== Career ==
Rodionov started his career with Kazakhstani side Atyrau. On 18 May 2013, he debuted for the club during a 0–4 loss to Akzhayik. In 2015, he signed for Kazakhstani side Astana. In 2018, he returned to Kazakhstani side Atyrau. In 2022, he signed for Armenian side Alashkert. He was described as "once considered one of the most promising and talented Kazakh strikers".

== Style of play ==
Rodionov mainly operated as a striker. He occasionally operated in other positions while playing for Kazakhstani side Atyrau.

== Personal life ==
Rodionov has a sister.
