= Bauyrzhan Dzholchiyev =

Kazakh footballer

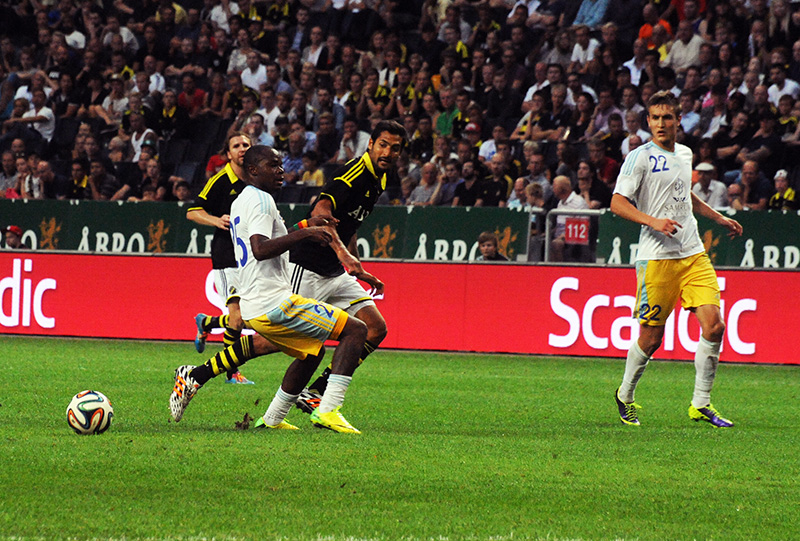
- Guy Essame, Celso Borges and Bauyrzhan Dzholchiev (2014)

Personal information
- Full name: Bauyrzhan Renatuly Dzholchiyev
- Date of birth: 8 May 1990 (age 36)
- Place of birth: Frunze, Kyrgyz SSR, Soviet Union
- Height: 1.90 m (6 ft 3 in)
- Position: Striker

Senior career*
Years	Team	Apps	(Gls)
2008–2009	Alma-Ata	2	(0)
2009–2011	Atyrau	41	(3)
2011–2013	Tobol	41	(14)
2014–2015	Astana	50	(9)

International career^{‡}
2010–2012	Kazakhstan U21	14	(1)
2012–2015	Kazakhstan	14	(3)
- * Club domestic league appearances and goals as of 26 November 2015 ‡ National team caps and goals as of 26 November 2015

Bauyrzhan Dzholchiyev (Kazakh: Бауыржан Жолшиев, born 8 May 1990) is a Kazakh footballer who last played for FC Astana and Kazakhstan national football team, as a striker.

== Early career ==
After joining FC Alma-Ata he started in the senior team in 2008. However, he has spent most of his early professional career at FC Atyrau, having played for the Caspian team 2 1/2 seasons through 2009–2011 and winning the first Kazakhstan Cup in the club's history in 2009.

=== Tobol ===
In June 2011 in the middle of the season Baurzhan moved to FC Tobol, where he started at UEFA Champions League 2011-12. In the beginning of season 2012 he was awarded Player of Month twice in March & April. On 1 June 2012, Baurzhan made a debut for the senior Kazakhstan team against Kyrgyzstan.

=== Astana ===
In March 2014 Dzholchiyev signed for FC Astana. On 18 August, he scored the only goal as they defeated APOEL FC in the first leg of the UEFA Champions League playoff.

In December 2017, it was rumoured that Dzholchiyev would join FC Ordabasy in January 2018, two years after his last game.

== Career statistics ==
=== Club ===
As of match played 9 December 2015.

Appearances and goals by club, season and competition
Club	Season	League			National Cup		League Cup		Continental		Other		Total	
Club	Season	Division	Apps	Goals	Apps	Goals	Apps	Goals	Apps	Goals	Apps	Goals	Apps	Goals
Almaty	2008	Kazakhstan Premier League	2	0			-		-		-		2	0
Atyrau	2009	Kazakhstan Premier League	7	0	3	1	-		-		-		10	1
Atyrau	2010	Kazakhstan Premier League	21	3	2	0	-		-		-		23	3
Atyrau	2011	Kazakhstan Premier League	13	0	1	1	-		-		-		14	1
Atyrau	Total		41	3	6	2	-	-	-	-	-	-	47	5
Tobol	2011	Kazakhstan Premier League	12	3	2	0	-		2	0	-		16	3
Tobol	2012	Kazakhstan Premier League	20	8	2	1	-		-		-		22	9
Tobol	2013	Kazakhstan Premier League	9	3	1	0	-		-		-		10	3
Tobol	Total		41	14	5	1	-	-	2	0	-	-	48	15
Astana	2014	Kazakhstan Premier League	24	6	2	0	-		7	3	-		33	9
Astana	2015	Kazakhstan Premier League	26	3	3	1	-		10	2	1	0	40	6
Astana	Total		50	9	5	1	-	-	17	3	1	0	73	15
Career total			134	26	16	4	-	-	19	3	1	0	170	40

=== International ===
Kazakhstan
Year	Apps	Goals
2012	3	0
2013	3	2
2014	5	1
2015	3	0
Total	14	3

Statistics accurate as of match played 29 February 2012

=== International goals ===
#	Date	Venue	Opponent	Score	Result	Competition
1.	6 February 2013	Mardan Sports Complex, Aksu, Turkey	Moldova	2–0	3–1	Friendly
2.	6 February 2013	Mardan Sports Complex, Aksu, Turkey	Moldova	3–1	3–1	Friendly
3.	5 September 2014	Astana Arena, Astana, Kazakhstan	Kyrgyzstan	5–0	7–1	Friendly
Correct as of 13 January 2017

== Honours ==
- Kazakhstan Premier League: 2014
- Kazakhstan Cup Winner: 2009
- Kazakhstan Cup Runner-up: 2011
- Player of Month by Sports.kz: March 2012, April 2012
- Kazakhstan Super Cup: 2015
