= Nenad Erić =

Kazakh footballer

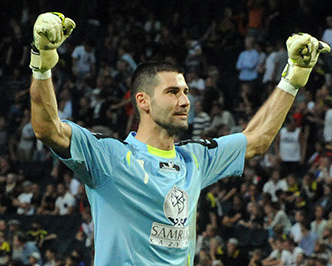
- Erić playing for Astana in 2014

Personal information
- Full name: Nenad Erić
- Date of birth: 26 May 1982 (age 44)
- Place of birth: Užička Požega, SR Serbia, SFR Yugoslavia
- Height: 1.97 m (6 ft 6 in)
- Position: Goalkeeper

Senior career*
Years	Team	Apps	(Gls)
1999–2002	Sloga Požega	45	(0)
2002	Radnički Kragujevac	20	(0)
2002–2007	OFK Beograd	29	(0)
2003	→ Big Bull Bačinci (loan)	17	(0)
2004	→ Mačva Šabac (loan)	18	(0)
2005	→ Mačva Šabac (loan)	11	(0)
2006–2007	→ Borac Čačak (loan)	22	(0)
2007–2008	Borac Čačak	17	(0)
2008–2009	Sibir Novosibirsk	1	(0)
2008	→ Dinamo Barnaul (loan)	13	(0)
2010	Kairat	31	(0)
2011–2020	Astana	227	(0)

International career
2015–2018	Kazakhstan	8	(0)
- * Club domestic league appearances and goals

Nenad Erić (Serbian Cyrillic: Ненад Ерић, Kazakh: Ненад Эрич, romanized: Nenad Eritş; born 26 May 1982) is a former footballer who played as a goalkeeper. Born in Serbia, he represented Kazakhstan at international level.

== Career ==
=== Club ===
On 2 March 2021, Astana confirmed that Erić had left the club after 10 years, and that they had retired the #1 shirt.

=== International ===
Erić made his debut for Kazakhstan on 18 February 2015 in a 1–1 draw at home to Moldova. In February 2019, Erić revealed that he had retired from international duty at the end of Kazakhstan's involvement in the 2018–19 UEFA Nations League. His final international was a Nations League match against Latvia in November 2018.

== Personal life ==
On 13 June 2014, Erić became a Kazakhstani citizen.

== Career statistics ==
=== Club ===
As of match played 27 November 2020

Club	Season	League			National Cup		Continental		Other		Total	
Club	Season	Division	Apps	Goals	Apps	Goals	Apps	Goals	Apps	Goals	Apps	Goals
Sloga Požega	1999-2000	Serbian League	3	0			-		-		3	0
Sloga Požega	2000–01	Serbian League	32	0			-		-		32	0
Sloga Požega	2001–02	Serbian League	10	0			-		-		10	0
Sloga Požega	Total		45	0			-	-	-	-	45	0
Radnički Kragujevac	2001–02	First League of Serbia and Montenegro	20	0			–		–		20	0
OFK Beograd	2003–04	First League of Serbia and Montenegro	1	0					-		1	0
OFK Beograd	2005–06	First League of Serbia and Montenegro	23	0			2	0	-		25	0
OFK Beograd	Total		24	0			2	0	-	-	26	0
Big Bull (loan)	2002–03	Second League of Serbia and Montenegro	17	0			–		-		17	0
Mačva Šabac (loan)	2003–04	Second League of Serbia and Montenegro	18	0			–		-		18	0
Mačva Šabac (loan)	2004–05	Second League of Serbia and Montenegro	11	0			–		-		11	0
Borac Čačak (loan)	2006–07	Serbian SuperLiga	22	0			–		-		22	0
Borac Čačak	2007–08	Serbian SuperLiga	17	0			–		-		17	0
Sibir Novosibirsk	2008	Russian First Division	1	0			–		-		1	0
Sibir Novosibirsk	2009	Russian First Division	0	0			–		-		0	0
Sibir Novosibirsk	Total		1	0			-	-	-	-	1	0
Dynamo Barnaul (loan)	2008	Russian First Division	20	0			–		-		20	0
Kairat	2010	Kazakhstan Premier League	31	0			–		0	0	31	0
Astana	2011	Kazakhstan Premier League	31	0	1	0	-		0	0	32	0
Astana	2012	Kazakhstan Premier League	22	0	8	0	-		0	0	30	0
Astana	2013	Kazakhstan Premier League	32	0	1	0	2	0	1	0	36	0
Astana	2014	Kazakhstan Premier League	14	0	2	0	7	0	-		23	0
Astana	2015	Kazakhstan Premier League	25	0	3	0	10	0	1	0	39	0
Astana	2016	Kazakhstan Premier League	30	0	0	0	11	0	1	0	42	0
Astana	2017	Kazakhstan Premier League	10	0	1	0	7	0	1	0	19	0
Astana	2018	Kazakhstan Premier League	20	0	0	0	16	0	1	0	37	0
Astana	2019	Kazakhstan Premier League	28	0	0	0	14	0	1	0	43	0
Astana	2020	Kazakhstan Premier League	15	0	0	0	1	0	1	0	17	0
Astana	Total		227	0	16	0	68	0	7	0	318	0
Career total			453	0	16	0	70	0	7	0	546	0

=== International ===
Kazakhstan
Year	Apps	Goals
2015	1	0
2018	7	0
Total	8	0

== Honours ==
Astana

- Kazakhstan Premier League: 2014, 2015, 2016, 2017, 2018
- Kazakhstan Cup: 2012, 2016
- Kazakhstan Super Cup: 2011, 2015, 2018
