= Patrick Twumasi =

Ghanaian footballer (born 1994)

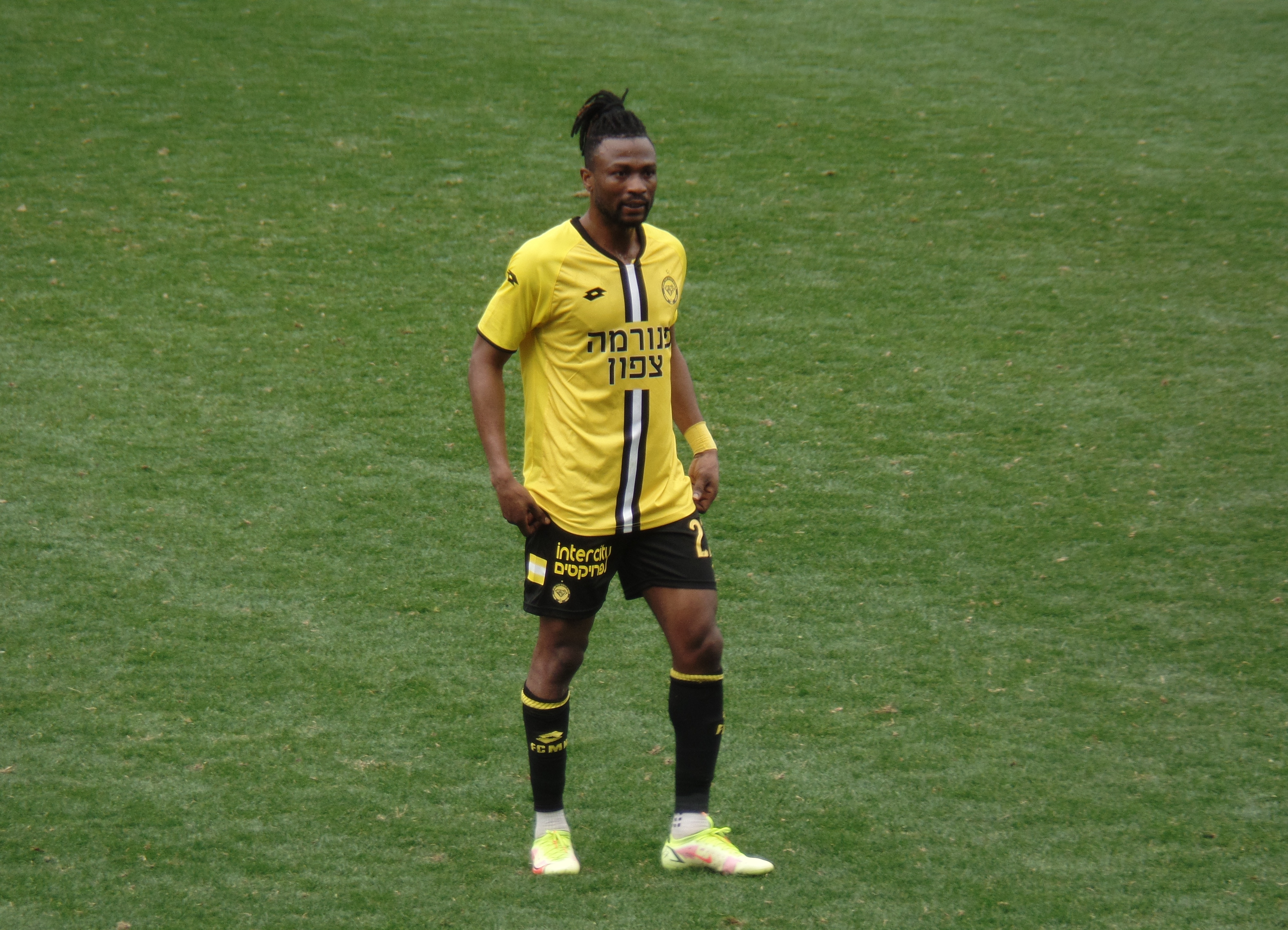

Personal information
- Date of birth: 9 May 1994 (age 32)
- Place of birth: Obuasi, Ghana
- Height: 1.78 m (5 ft 10 in)
- Position: Winger

Team information
- Current team: Jeonbuk Hyundai Motors
- Number: 21

Youth career
- Red Bull Ghana

Senior career*
Years	Team	Apps	(Gls)
2012–2014	Spartaks Jūrmala	31	(16)
2013	→ Astana (loan)	11	(6)
2014	→ Amkar Perm (loan)	6	(0)
2014	→ Astana (loan)	11	(10)
2015–2018	Astana	101	(32)
2018–2020	Alavés	11	(0)
2019–2020	→ Gaziantep (loan)	26	(6)
2020–2022	Hannover 96	22	(3)
2022–2023	Maccabi Netanya	40	(14)
2023–2025	Pafos	23	(3)
2024–2025	→ Beitar Jerusalem (loan)	33	(7)
2025–	Jeonbuk Hyundai Motors	6	(0)

International career^{‡}
2017	Ghana	2	(0)
- * Club domestic league appearances and goals as of 3 August 2026 ‡ National team caps and goals as of 13 November 2017

Patrick Twumasi (born 9 May 1994) is a Ghanaian professional footballer who plays as a right winger for K League 1 club Jeonbuk Hyundai Motors. He made two appearances for the Ghana national team in 2017.

== Club career ==
=== Spartaks Jūrmala ===
Born in Obuasi, Patrick Twumasi joined the Latvian Higher League club Spartaks Jūrmala from Red Bull Ghana prior to the 2012 Latvian Higher League season. Soon he established himself as a first eleven player, scoring 10 goals in 22 league appearances and becoming the team's top scorer and divided seventh top scorer of the championship. In the beginning of the 2013 season, Twumasi scored six goals in the first nine matches and was named Latvian Higher League player of the month in May 2013.

==== Loans ====
In July 2013, Twumasi joined the Kazakhstan Premier League club FC Astana on loan from Spartaks Jūrmala. He scored six goals in 11 matches during the loan spell and later returned to Spartaks Jūrmala.

Prior to the 2014 season, Twumasi was loaned out to Russian Premier League club Amkar Perm. He made his debut in the Russian Premier League on 10 March 2014 in a game against Volga Nizhny Novgorod.

On 9 July 2014, Twumasi rejoined FC Astana on loan for the rest of the 2014 season. Scoring 10 goals in 11 matches he became the club's top scorer and helped Astana win the league.

=== Astana ===
Twumasi signed permanently for FC Astana prior to the 2015 season, despite attracting attention from other European clubs.

On 27 July 2017, Twumasi signed a new two-year contract with Astana.

=== Alavés ===
On 27 July 2018, Twumasi signed a four-year deal with La Liga side Deportivo Alavés.

=== Gaziantep ===
On 16 August 2019, Twumasi signed a one-year loan deal with Turkish Süper Lig club Gaziantep.

=== Hannover 96 ===
On 4 September 2020, Twumasi signed a three-year contract with 2. Bundesliga club Hannover 96.

=== Maccabi Netanya ===
On 3 February 2022, Twumasi signed with Israeli Premier League club Maccabi Netanya.

=== Pafos ===
On 3 August 2023, Pafos announced the signing of Twumasi from Maccabi Netanya.

==== Beitar Jerusalem (loan) ====
On 23 July 2024, Beitar Jerusalem announced the season-long loan signing of Twumasi from Pafos.

=== Jeonbuk Hyundai Motors ===
On 20 June 2025, Jeonbuk Hyundai Motors announced the signing of Twumasi.

== International career ==
Twumasi was called up to the senior Ghana squad by Avram Grant for a 2017 Africa Cup of Nations qualifier against Mauritius in June 2016.

== Career statistics ==
=== Club ===
As of match played 10 August 2024

Appearances and goals by club, season and competition
Club	Season	League			National Cup		League Cup		Continental		Other		Total	
Club	Season	Division	Apps	Goals	Apps	Goals	Apps	Goals	Apps	Goals	Apps	Goals		
Spartaks Jūrmala	2012	Latvian Higher League	22	10	0	0	–		–		–		22	10
Spartaks Jūrmala	2013	Latvian Higher League	9	6	1	0	–		–		–		10	6
Spartaks Jūrmala	2014	Latvian Higher League	0	0	0	0	–		–		–		0	0
Spartaks Jūrmala	Total		31	16	1	0	–		–		–		32	16
Astana (loan)	2013	Kazakhstan Premier League	11	6	0	0	–		–		–		11	6
Amkar Perm (loan)	2013–14	Russian Premier League	6	0	0	0	–		–		–		6	0
Astana (loan)	2014	Kazakhstan Premier League	11	10	1	0	–		5	0	–		17	10
Astana	2015	Kazakhstan Premier League	28	6	5	6	–		6	4	1	0	40	16
Astana	2016	Kazakhstan Premier League	28	5	2	0	–		10	1	1	0	41	6
Astana	2017	Kazakhstan Premier League	30	13	1	0	–		12	9	1	0	44	22
Astana	2018	Kazakhstan Premier League	15	8	0	0	–		2	1	1	0	18	9
Astana	Total		101	32	8	6	–		30	15	4	0	143	53
Alavés	2018–19	La Liga	11	0	2	0	–		–		–		13	0
Alavés	2019–20	La Liga	0	0	0	0	–		–		–		0	0
Alavés	Total		11	0	2	0	–		–		–		11	0
Gaziantep (loan)	2019–20	Süper Lig	26	6	1	0	–		–		–		27	6
Hannover 96	2020–21	2. Bundesliga	22	3	2	0	–		–		–		24	3
Hannover 96	2021–22	2. Bundesliga	0	0	0	0	–		–		–		0	0
Hannover 96	Total		22	3	2	0	–		–		–		24	3
Maccabi Netanya	2021–22	Israeli Premier League	15	7	0	0	0	0	–		–		15	7
Maccabi Netanya	2022–23	Israeli Premier League	25	7	6	2	3	0	2	0	–		36	9
Maccabi Netanya	Total		40	14	6	2	3	0	2	0	–		51	16
Pafos	2023–24	Cypriot First Division	23	3	1	0	—		—		—		24	3
Pafos	2024–25	Cypriot First Division	0	0	0	0	—		1	0	—		1	0
Pafos	Total		23	3	1	0	–		1	0	–		25	3
Beitar Jerusalem (loan)	2024–25	Israeli Premier League	0	0	0	0	4	2	—		—		7	2
Career total			282	90	22	8	7	2	38	15	4	0	353	115

=== International ===
As of 12 November 2017

Appearances and goals by national team and year
National team	Year	Apps	Goals
Ghana	2017	2	0
Ghana	Total	2	0

== Honours ==
Astana

- Kazakhstan Premier League: 2014, 2015, 2016, 2017
- Kazakhstan Super Cup: 2015

Maccabi Netanya

- Toto Cup Al: 2022–23

Pafos

- Cypriot Cup: 2023–24
