= 2017 FC Akzhayik season =

FC Akzhayik
2017 season
- Chairman: Rashid Khusnutdinov
- Manager: Artur Avakyants
- Stadium: Petr Atoyan Stadium
- Kazakhstan Premier League: 10th
- Kazakhstan Cup: Last 16 vs Aktobe
- Top goalscorer: League: Izu Azuka (5); All: Izu Azuka (5)

The 2016 FC Akzhayik season is the club's 9th season in the Kazakhstan Premier League, the highest tier of association football in Kazakhstan, and their second since 2010.They will also participate in the Kazakhstan Cup.

== Squad ==
As of 19 August 2017

Note: Flags indicate national team as defined under FIFA eligibility rules; some limited exceptions apply. Players may hold more than one non-FIFA nationality.

No.	Pos.	Nation	Player
5	MF	KAZ	Ivan Antipov
6	MF	MNE	Jovan Nikolić
8	MF	KAZ	Mirada Zharylgasov
9	FW	MNE	Marko Đurović
10	MF	COL	Jhoan Arenas
12	MF	KAZ	Konstantin Zarechny
13	DF	KAZ	Miram Sapanov
14	MF	KAZ	Alibek Ayaganov
15	DF	KAZ	Dmitri Schmidt
16	MF	PAR	Freddy Coronel
17	MF	KAZ	Shyngys Saparbekuly
18	MF	KAZ	Georgi Makayev
19	MF	KAZ	Azat Ersalimov
20	DF	NGR	Michael Odibe

No.	Pos.	Nation	Player
22	GK	KAZ	Alexander Udalov
26	DF	KAZ	Erkin Tapalov
27	DF	KAZ	Andrey Shabaev
28	MF	KAZ	Yuriy Pertsukh
30	MF	CRO	Denis Glavina
32	GK	KAZ	Denis Tolebaev
33	GK	KAZ	Vyacheslav Kotlyar
47		KAZ	Altynbek Imanbekov
54	FW	UKR	Kostyantyn Dudchenko
55	MF	SRB	Predrag Govedarica
77	DF	KAZ	Abylkhair Zulfikar
83		KAZ	Girikhan Shadiev
—	FW	KAZ	Altynbek Daulethanov

== Transfers ==
=== Winter ===
In: Note: Flags indicate national team as defined under FIFA eligibility rules; some limited exceptions apply. Players may hold more than one non-FIFA nationality.

No.	Pos.	Nation	Player
6	MF	MNE	Jovan Nikolić (from (Montenegro) Sutjeska Nikšić)
9	FW	KAZ	Samit Chulagov (from (Kazakhstan) Bayterek)
10	MF	COL	Jhoan Arenas (from (Venezuela) Zamora)
12	MF	KAZ	Konstantin Zarechny (from (Kazakhstan) Altai Semey)
15	DF	KAZ	Dmitri Schmidt (from (Kazakhstan) Altai Semey)
19	MF	KAZ	Azat Ersalimov (from (Kazakhstan) Altai Semey)
22	GK	KAZ	Alexander Udalov
25	FW	NGR	Izu Azuka
27	DF	KAZ	Andrey Shabaev (from (Kazakhstan) Zhetysu)
28	MF	KAZ	Yuriy Pertsukh (from (Kazakhstan) Kyzylzhar)
33	GK	KAZ	Vyacheslav Kotlyar (from (Kazakhstan) Altai Semey)
—	MF	KAZ	Georgi Makayev (from (Kazakhstan) Kyzylzhar)
—	MF	KAZ	Mirada Zharylgasov

Out: Note: Flags indicate national team as defined under FIFA eligibility rules; some limited exceptions apply. Players may hold more than one non-FIFA nationality.

No.	Pos.	Nation	Player
1	GK	KAZ	Nurbolat Kalmenov
6	DF	BIH	Saša Kolunija (to (India) DSK Shivajians)
8	FW	KAZ	Aleksey Maltsev
11	MF	KAZ	Rakhimzhan Rozybakiev (to (Kazakhstan) Aktobe)
12	FW	SRB	Miroslav Lečić (to (Serbia) Jagodina)
15	MF	KAZ	Yevgeniy Levin (loan return to (Kazakhstan) Tobol)
17	MF	KAZ	Sergey Shevtsov
18	MF	KAZ	Ruslan Khairov
22	MF	KAZ	Nikolay Zabrodin
23	DF	KAZ	Zakhar Korobov
24	FW	KAZ	Kuanysh Begalin (loan return to (Kazakhstan) Irtysh Pavlodar)
28	FW	KAZ	Sergey Gridin
32	GK	SRB	Srđan Ostojić (to (Serbia) Zemun)
44	MF	KAZ	Marat Shakhmetov (to (Kazakhstan) Shakhter Karagandy)
77	DF	KAZ	Eldar Abdrakhmanov
83	DF	SRB	Danilo Nikolić (to (Serbia) OFK Beograd)
87	GK	KAZ	Roman Bagautdinov
88	MF	KAZ	Anton Shurygin

=== Summer ===
In: Note: Flags indicate national team as defined under FIFA eligibility rules; some limited exceptions apply. Players may hold more than one non-FIFA nationality.

No.	Pos.	Nation	Player
9	FW	MNE	Marko Đurović (from (Montenegro) Lovćen)
14	MF	KAZ	Alibek Ayaganov (from (Kazakhstan) Okzhetpes)
30	MF	CRO	Denis Glavina (from (Kazakhstan) Tobol)
47		KAZ	Altynbek Imanbekov
83		KAZ	Girikhan Shadiev
—	FW	KAZ	Altynbek Daulethanov
—	FW	SRB	Miroslav Lečić (from (Serbia) Jagodina)

Out: Note: Flags indicate national team as defined under FIFA eligibility rules; some limited exceptions apply. Players may hold more than one non-FIFA nationality.

No.	Pos.	Nation	Player
7	MF	KAZ	Ruslan Valiullin (to (Kazakhstan) Aktobe)
9	FW	KAZ	Samit Chulagov (loan to (Kazakhstan) Makhtaaral)
11	FW	CHI	Matías Rubio
14	DF	KAZ	Bauyrzhan Omarov (to (Kazakhstan) Kaisar)
25	FW	NGR	Izu Azuka
34	MF	KAZ	Eduard Sergienko (to (Kazakhstan) Atyrau)
—	FW	SRB	Miroslav Lečić

== Competitions ==
=== Kazakhstan Premier League ===
==== Results summary ====
Overall								Home						Away					
Pld	W	D	L	GF	GA	GD	Pts	W	D	L	GF	GA	GD	W	D	L	GF	GA	GD
32	7	8	17	27	46	−19	29	5	5	5	17	17	0	2	3	12	10	29	−19

Last updated: 5 November 2017.
Source: See Results

==== Results by round ====
Round	1	2	3	4	5	6	7	8	9	10	11	12	13	14	15	16	17	18	19	20	21	22	23	24	25	26	27	28	29	30	31	32	33
Ground	A	H	A	H	A	H	A	H	A	H	A	A	H	A	A	H	A	H	A	H	H	H	A	H	A	H	A	H	H	A	A	H	A
Result	L	W	L	D	D	D	D	W	L	W	L	L	L	L	L	D	D	L	L	L	D	L	W	D	L	W	W	W	L	L	L	D	L
Position	8	6	8	8	7	7	7	7	7	6	7	7	7	8	8	11	11	12	12	12	12	12	11	11	12	11	11	7	9	11	10	10	10

Source: See Results
A = Away; H = Home; W = Win; D = Draw; L = Loss

==== Results ====
8 March 2017 1	Irtysh Pavlodar	2 – 1	Akzhayik	Pavlodar
15:00 (UTC+6)	A.Darabayev 46'; Živković 88' (pen.)	Summary	Govedarica (yellow card) 31'; Dudchenko (yellow card) 50'; Coronel 83'; K.Zarechny (yellow card) 87'; Nikolić (yellow card) 87'	Stadium: Central Stadium; Attendance: 4,500; Referee: Timur Kumashev

12 March 2017 2	Akzhayik	3 – 1	Shakhter Karagandy	Oral
16:00 (UTC+6)	Rubio 2'; Azuka 8' (pen.), 72'; M.Sapanov (yellow card) 21'; D.Tolebaev (yellow card) 87'	Summary	I.Shatsky (yellow card) 7'; Szöke (yellow card) 44'; Tazhimbetov 69'	Stadium: Petr Atoyan Stadium; Attendance: 3,500; Referee: Daniyar Sakhi

17 March 2017 3	Astana	3 – 1	Akzhayik	Astana
17:30 (UTC+6)	Kabananga 12'; Llullaku 13'; Twumasi 62'; Mayewski (yellow card) 79'	Summary	D.Schmidt (yellow card) 26'; Nikolić (yellow card) 48'; A.Shabaev (yellow card) 54'; Rubio 65'; Odibe (yellow card) 79'	Stadium: Astana Arena; Attendance: 1,500; Referee: Furkhat Atazhanov

1 April 2017 4	Akzhayik	2 – 2	Atyrau	Oral
16:00 (UTC+6)	A.Shabaev (yellow card) 34'; M.Sapanov 64'; Arenas 70'; D.Tolebaev (yellow card) 84'	Summary	A.Marov (yellow card) 30'; Rodić (yellow card) 45+1'; Obšivač 57'; Đokić (yellow card) 60'; Maksimović 88' (pen.)	Stadium: Petr Atoyan Stadium; Attendance: 3,000; Referee: Bagdat Abdullaev

8 April 2017 5	Aktobe	1 – 1	Akzhayik	Aktobe
16:00 (UTC+6)	Cassiano (yellow card) 30' (goal) 87'; R.Aslan (yellow card) 56'	Summary	M.Sapanov 10' 60'; A.Shabaev (yellow card) 53'; Valiullin (yellow card) 67' (yellow-red card) 80'; Nikolić (yellow card) 76'; Rubio (yellow card) 90+3'	Stadium: Central Stadium; Attendance: 3,000; Referee: Grigory Moskovchenko

12 April 2017 6	Akzhayik	1 – 1	Okzhetpes	Oral
18:00 (UTC+6)	A.Ersalimov (yellow card) 1'; Govedarica 90' (yellow card) 90+2'	Summary	Marochkin 18'; S.Shaff (yellow card) 62'	Stadium: Petr Atoyan Stadium; Attendance: 2,000; Referee: Timur Kumashev

16 April 2017 7	Taraz	0 – 0	Akzhayik	Taraz
17:00 (UTC+6)	Ergashev (yellow card) 73'; Shipitsin (yellow card) 77'	Summary	Coronel (yellow card) 49'	Stadium: Central Stadium; Attendance: 3,000; Referee: Georgiy Chekhovskiy

23 April 2017 8	Akzhayik	1 – 0	Kaisar	Oral
18:00 (UTC+6)	D.Schmidt (yellow card) 36'; Valiullin 56'; K.Zarechny (yellow card) 79'; Azuka (yellow card) 90+2'	Summary		Stadium: Petr Atoyan Stadium; Attendance: 2,000; Referee: Askhat Abdanbayev

29 April 2017 9	Kairat	4 – 1	Akzhayik	Almaty
18:00 (UTC+6)	Islamkhan 2'; Gohou 32'; Valiullin 48' (o.g.); Suyumbayev 58'; Bakayev (yellow card) 81'	Report	Valiullin 82'	Stadium: Central Stadium; Attendance: 7,000; Referee: Daniyar Sakhi

2 May 2017 10	Akzhayik	1 – 0	Tobol	Oral
18:00 (UTC+6)	B.Omarov (yellow card) 24'; Sergienko 76'	Report	T.Zhakupov (yellow card) 29'; G.Sartakov (yellow card) 75'; Dmitrenko (yellow card) 90+1'	Stadium: Petr Atoyan Stadium; Attendance: 2,000; Referee: Bagdat Abdullaev

6 May 2017 11	Ordabasy	3 – 0	Akzhayik	Shymkent
16:00 (UTC+6)	Fontanello 2'; T.Erlanov 50'; Kovalchuk (yellow card) 60'; Nusserbayev 64'	Report	Pertsukh (yellow card) 28'; Coronel (yellow card) 31'; Rubio (yellow card) 46'; Nikolić (yellow card) 63'	Stadium: Kazhymukan Munaitpasov Stadium; Attendance: 3,000; Referee: Igor Chesnokov

14 May 2017 12	Shakhter Karagandy	1 – 0	Akzhayik	Karaganda
16:00 (UTC+6)	Aiyegbusi (yellow card) 16'; A.Allegria (yellow card) 34'; I.Pikalkin (yellow card) 45+1'; A.Tattybaev 82'	Report	D.Tolebaev (yellow card) 73'	Stadium: Shakhter Stadium; Attendance: 1,500; Referee: Furkat Atajanov

20 May 2017 13	Akzhayik	0 – 2	Astana	Oral
18:00 (UTC+6)	Nikolić (yellow card) 57' (yellow-red card) 69'	Report	Logvinenko (yellow card) 53'; Mayewski 60'; Shomko (yellow card) 68'; Murtazayev 75'	Stadium: Petr Atoyan Stadium; Attendance: 2,000; Referee: Artyom Kuchin

28 May 2017 14	Atyrau	2 – 0	Akzhayik	Atyrau
19:00 (UTC+6)	Maksimović (yellow card) 16'; Dvalishvili 30', 59'; E.Abdrakhmanov (yellow card) 73'	Report	B.Omarov (yellow card) 53'; Arenas (yellow card) 60'; K.Zarechny (yellow card) 69'; Govedarica (yellow card) 75'	Stadium: Munaishy Stadium; Attendance: 6,000; Referee: Askhat Abdanbayev

3 June 2017 15	Akzhayik	–	Aktobe	Oral
15:00 (UTC+6)				Stadium: Petr Atoyan Stadium

18 June 2017 16	Okzhetpes	2 – 1	Akzhayik	Astana
17:00 (UTC+6)	Fedin (yellow card) 10'; Marochkin 29'; Kozlov 36'; A.Kuksin (yellow card) 55'; O.Nedashkovsky (yellow card) 76' (yellow-red card) 83'; Stamenković (yellow card) 90+1'	Report	Govedarica (yellow card) 32'; Pertsukh (yellow card) 43'; Azuka 57' (pen.)	Stadium: Tarlan Arena; Attendance: 50; Referee: Furkat Atajanov

25 June 2017 17	Akzhayik	2 – 2	Taraz	Oral
18:00 (UTC+6)	Azuka 26', 87' (pen.)	Report	Ba.Zaynutdinov 54'; Feshchuk 65' (yellow card) 78'; Shipitsin (yellow card) 85'; B.Shadmanov (yellow card) 89'	Stadium: Petr Atoyan Stadium; Attendance: 3,000; Referee: Georgiy Chekhovskiy

1 July 2017 18	Kaisar	0 – 0	Akzhayik	Kyzylorda
19:00 (UTC+6)	I.Amirseitov (yellow card) 29'; D.Yevstigneyev (yellow card) 59'	Report	Glavina (yellow card) 15'; Govedarica (yellow card) 33'	Stadium: Gani Muratbayev Stadium; Attendance: 1,500; Referee: Askhat Abdanbayev

9 July 2017 19	Akzhayik	0 – 1	Kairat	Oral
19:00 (UTC+6)		Report	Isael 58'; Islamkhan (yellow card) 68'; Akhmetov (yellow card) 86'	Stadium: Petr Atoyan Stadium; Attendance: 4,000; Referee: Timur Kumashev

15 July 2017 20	Tobol	2 – 0	Akzhayik	Kostanay
18:00 (UTC+6)	R.Jalilov (yellow card) 52'; Kassaï 70'; Moldakaraev 74'; G.Sartakov (yellow card) 75'	Report	Nikolić (yellow card) 74'; Odibe (yellow card) 77'; D.Schmidt (yellow card) 82'	Stadium: Stadion Zatobolets; Attendance: 1,850; Referee: Grigory Moskovchenko

22 July 2017 21	Akzhayik	1 – 2	Ordabasy	Oral
19:00 (UTC+6)	I.Antipov 40' (yellow card) 61'; Odibe (yellow card) 55'; Govedarica (yellow card) 88'; Dudchenko (yellow card) 90+4'	Report	Nusserbayev 27', 36'; Petrak (yellow card) 60'; Nurgaliev (yellow card) 68'; T.Erlanov (yellow card) 77'; Cañas (yellow card) 87'; A.Bekbaev (yellow card) 90+4'	Stadium: Petr Atoyan Stadium; Attendance: 2,000; Referee: Marat Iskakov

26 July 2017 15	Akzhayik	2 – 2	Aktobe	Oral
18:00 (UTC+6)	A.Ersalimov 50'; Pertsukh (yellow card) 57'; M.Sapanov (yellow card) 73'; D.Schmidt (yellow card) 83'; Nikolić (yellow card) 90'; Govedarica 90+5'	Report	Šimkovič 24'; Shestakov (yellow card) 73'; Zyankovich (yellow card) 77'; Nane 80'; Obradović (yellow card) 90'	Stadium: Petr Atoyan Stadium; Attendance: 2,000

30 July 2017 22	Akzhayik	0 – 1	Irtysh Pavlodar	Oral
19:00 (UTC+6)	Govedarica (yellow card) 38'; Pertsukh (yellow card) 87'	Report	Bugaiov (yellow card) 11' (goal) 18'	Stadium: Petr Atoyan Stadium; Attendance: 1,200; Referee: Daniyar Sakhi

13 August 2017 23	Taraz	0 – 1	Akzhayik	Taraz
19:00 (UTC+6)	Maurice (yellow card) 59'; D.Babakhanov (yellow card) 90+2'	Report	Govedarica (yellow card) 30'; D.Schmidt 72'; Coronel (yellow card) 90+3'	Stadium: Central Stadium; Attendance: 4,000; Referee: Igor Chesnokov

19 August 2017 24	Akzhayik	2 – 2	Aktobe	Oral
19:00 (UTC+6)	Đurović 20', 57'; Nikolić (yellow card) 90+3'	Report	Obradović (yellow card) 7'; Zyankovich 47', 82' (pen.); Kolčák (yellow card) 68'	Stadium: Petr Atoyan Stadium; Attendance: 3,500; Referee: Aleksei Bobrov

26 August 2017 25	Tobol	2 – 0	Akzhayik	Kostanay
18:00 (UTC+6)	Moldakaraev 12'; D.Zhalmukan (yellow card) 58'; S.Zharynbektov 83'	Report	K.Zarechny (yellow card) 21'	Stadium: Central Stadium; Attendance: 3,000; Referee: Artyom Kuchin

9 September 2017 26	Akzhayik	2 – 0	Okzhetpes	Oral
18:00 (UTC+6)	A.Shabaev (yellow card) 32'; Đurović (yellow card) 39'; Dudchenko 42'; Glavina 45'	Report	Gogua (yellow card) 6'; N.Dairov (yellow card) 39'	Stadium: Petr Atoyan Stadium; Attendance: 2,000; Referee: Denis Izmailov

16 September 2017 27	Irtysh Pavlodar	0 – 1	Akzhayik	Pavlodar
17:00 (UTC+6)	A.Darabayev (yellow card) 74'; Aliev (red card) 90'	Report	K.Zarechny (yellow card) 33'; Nikolić (yellow card) 40'; Pertsukh 72'	Stadium: Central Stadium; Attendance: 2,500; Referee: Bagdat Abdullaev

20 September 2017 30	Akzhayik	1 – 0	Atyrau	Oral
18:00 (UTC+6)	Pertsukh 79'	Report		Stadium: Petr Atoyan Stadium; Attendance: 3,000; Referee: Aydin Rakhimbayev

24 September 2017 28	Akzhayik	1 – 2	Shakhter Karagandy	Oral
18:00 (UTC+6)	A.Ersalimov 49'; Pertsukh (yellow card) 61'	Report	Zošák 34'; Szöke (yellow card) 40'; Valenta (yellow card) 52'; Aiyegbusi 90+3'	Stadium: Petr Atoyan Stadium; Attendance: 2,700; Referee: Igor Aleshin

30 September 2017 29	Ordabasy	3 – 2	Akzhayik	Shymkent
16:00 (UTC+6)	M.Tolebek 38'; Vujaklija 50'; Mukhtarov (yellow card) 75'; Yordanov 90'	Report	A.Ersalimov (yellow card) 35'; Odibe (yellow card) 37' (goal) 45+1'; Glavina 73'	Stadium: Kazhymukan Munaitpasov Stadium; Attendance: 3,500; Referee: Aleksandr Aliyev

21 October 2017 31	Kairat	2 – 1	Akzhayik	Almaty
15:00 (UTC+6)	Islamkhan 10' (pen.) (yellow card) 54'; A.Sokolenko (yellow card) 30'; Anene 67'; Kuat (yellow card) 89'	Report	Odibe (yellow card) 9'; Dudchenko 31' (pen.); Glavina (yellow card) 33'; Arenas (yellow card) 59'; Govedarica (yellow card) 88'	Stadium: Central Stadium; Attendance: 5,500; Referee: Furkat Atajanov

28 October 2017 32	Akzhayik	0 – 0	Kaisar	Oral
15:00 (UTC+6)	A.Ersalimov (yellow card) 90+1'	Report	V.Chureyev (yellow card) 23'; Korobkin (yellow card) 63'; Kamara (yellow card) 75'	Stadium: Petr Atoyan Stadium; Attendance: 1,100; Referee: Aleksei Bobrov

5 November 2017 33	Astana	2 – 0	Akzhayik	Astana
15:00 (UTC+6)	Kabananga 50', 90+4'; Shitov (yellow card) 61'	Report		Stadium: Astana Arena; Attendance: 7,000; Referee: Artyom Kuchin

==== League table ====
Pos	Team	Pld	W	D	L	GF	GA	GD	Pts	Qualification or relegation
8	Atyrau (Note: Atyrau started the season with –9 points as a punishment for unpaid debts to former manager Zoran Filipović. On 24 April 2017, Atyrau had six points returned to after they cleared their debt to Filipović, with three points retained due to debts to Jonathas.)	33	10	8	15	34	54	−20	35	
9	Aktobe	33	8	9	16	38	46	−8	33	
10	Akzhayik (O)	33	7	9	17	29	47	−18	30	Qualification for the relegation play-offs
11	Taraz (Note: Taraz had six points deducted as a punishment for unpaid debts to former player Obiora Odita.) (R)	33	8	8	17	29	50	−21	26	Relegation to the Kazakhstan First Division
12	Okzhetpes (R)	33	7	3	23	28	61	−33	24	Relegation to the Kazakhstan First Division

Source: UEFA, Soccerway
Rules for classification: 1) Points; 2) Head-to-head points; 3) Head-to-head matches won; 4) Head-to-head goal difference; 5) Head-to-head goals scored; 6) Head-to-head away goals scored; 7) Goal difference; 8) Matches won; 9) Goals scored; 10) Away goals scored; 11) Draw.
(O) Play-off winners; (R) Relegated

==== Relegation play-off ====
9 November 2017	Akzhayik	2 – 1	Makhtaaral	Astana
15:00 (UTC+6)	Dudchenko 45+1', 86' (yellow card) 81'	Report	S.Chulagov (yellow card) 26' (goal) 35'; Vlasichev (yellow card) 53'; Pasechenko (yellow card) 81'	Stadium: Astana Arena; Attendance: 1,900; Referee: Marat Iskakov

=== Kazakhstan Cup ===
19 April 2017 Last 16	Akzhayik	0 – 0 (4 –5 p)	Aktobe	Oral
18:00 (UTC+6)	S.Chulagov (yellow card) 9'; Rubio (yellow card) 17'; I.Antipov (yellow card) 35'; B.Omarov (yellow card) 37'	Summary	Torres (yellow card) 19'; R.Rozybakiyev (yellow card) 112'	Stadium: Petr Atoyan Stadium; Attendance: 2,300; Referee: Marat Iskakov
	Penalties
	A.Shabaev (penalty scored); Pertsukh (penalty scored); E.Tapalov (penalty scored); Valiullin (penalty missed); B.Omarov (penalty scored)		Juninho (penalty scored); Cassiano (penalty scored); A.Kakimov (penalty scored); Zyankovich (penalty scored); Volovyk (penalty scored)

== Squad statistics ==
As of Match played 5 November 2017

=== Appearances and goals ===
No.	Pos	Nat	Player	Total		Premier League		Playoff		Kazakhstan Cup	
No.	Pos	Nat	Player	Apps	Goals	Apps	Goals	Apps	Goals	Apps	Goals
5	MF	(Kazakhstan) KAZ	Ivan Antipov	15	1	7+6	1	1	0	1	0
6	MF	(Montenegro) MNE	Jovan Nikolić	29	0	29	0	0	0	0	0
9	FW	(Montenegro) MNE	Marko Đurović	8	2	7+1	2	0	0	0	0
10	MF	(Colombia) COL	Jhoan Arenas	26	1	12+13	1	0	0	0+1	0
12	MF	(Kazakhstan) KAZ	Konstantin Zarechny	22	0	16+5	0	1	0	0	0
13	DF	(Kazakhstan) KAZ	Miram Sapanov	27	2	24+2	2	1	0	0	0
14	MF	(Kazakhstan) KAZ	Alibek Ayaganov	4	0	0+3	0	0+1	0	0	0
15	DF	(Kazakhstan) KAZ	Dmitri Schmidt	29	1	26+1	1	1	0	0+1	0
16	MF	(Paraguay) PAR	Freddy Coronel	21	1	16+5	1	0	0	0	0
17	MF	(Kazakhstan) KAZ	Shyngys Saparbekuly	1	0	0	0	0	0	1	0
18	MF	(Kazakhstan) KAZ	Georgi Makayev	2	0	0+1	0	0	0	1	0
19	MF	(Kazakhstan) KAZ	Azat Ersalimov	32	2	25+6	2	1	0	0	0
20	DF	(Nigeria) NGR	Michael Odibe	33	1	32	1	1	0	0	0
26	DF	(Kazakhstan) KAZ	Erkin Tapalov	24	0	0+22	0	0+1	0	1	0
27	DF	(Kazakhstan) KAZ	Andrey Shabaev	28	0	16+10	0	1	0	1	0
28	MF	(Kazakhstan) KAZ	Yuriy Pertsukh	26	2	20+4	2	1	0	1	0
30	MF	(Croatia) CRO	Denis Glavina	14	2	13+1	2	0	0	0	0
32	GK	(Kazakhstan) KAZ	Denis Tolebaev	18	0	18	0	0	0	0	0
33	GK	(Kazakhstan) KAZ	Vyacheslav Kotlyar	17	0	15	0	1	0	1	0
54	FW	(Ukraine) UKR	Kostyantyn Dudchenko	19	4	16+2	2	1	2	0	0
55	MF	(Serbia) SRB	Predrag Govedarica	27	2	26	2	1	0	0	0
77	DF	(Kazakhstan) KAZ	Abylkhair Zulfikarov	3	0	1+1	0	0	0	1	0
Players away from Akzhayik on loan:
Players who left Akzhayik during the season:
7	MF	(Kazakhstan) KAZ	Ruslan Valiullin	13	2	9+3	2	0	0	0+1	0
9	FW	(Kazakhstan) KAZ	Samit Chulagov	3	0	0+2	0	0	0	1	0
11	FW	(Chile) CHI	Matías Rubio	10	2	5+4	2	0	0	1	0
14	DF	(Kazakhstan) KAZ	Bauyrzhan Omarov	8	0	5+2	0	0	0	1	0
25	FW	(Nigeria) NGR	Izu Azuka	17	5	17	5	0	0	0	0
34	MF	(Kazakhstan) KAZ	Eduard Sergienko	9	1	7+2	1	0	0	0	0

=== Goal scorers ===
Place	Position	Nation	Number	Name	Premier League	Playoff	Kazakhstan Cup	Total
1	FW	(Nigeria)	25	Izu Azuka	5	0	0	5
2	FW	(Ukraine)	54	Kostyantyn Dudchenko	2	2	0	4
3	FW	(Chile)	11	Matías Rubio	2	0	0	2
3	DF	(Kazakhstan)	13	Miram Sapanov	2	0	0	2
3	MF	(Kazakhstan)	7	Ruslan Valiullin	2	0	0	2
3	MF	(Serbia)	55	Predrag Govedarica	2	0	0	2
3	FW	(Montenegro)	9	Marko Đurović	2	0	0	2
3	MF	(Kazakhstan)	28	Yuriy Pertsukh	2	0	0	2
3	MF	(Kazakhstan)	19	Azat Ersalimov	2	0	0	2
3	MF	(Croatia)	30	Denis Glavina	2	0	0	2
11	MF	(Paraguay)	16	Freddy Coronel	1	0	0	1
11	MF	(Colombia)	10	Jhoan Arenas	1	0	0	1
11	MF	(Kazakhstan)	34	Eduard Sergienko	1	0	0	1
11	MF	(Kazakhstan)	5	Ivan Antipov	1	0	0	1
11	DF	(Kazakhstan)	15	Dmitri Schmidt	1	0	0	1
11	DF	(Nigeria)	20	Michael Odibe	1	0	0	1
				TOTALS	27	2	0	29

=== Disciplinary record ===
Number	Nation	Position	Name	Premier League		Playoff		Kazakhstan Cup		Total	
Number	Nation	Position	Name	Yellow card	Red card	Yellow card	Red card	Yellow card	Red card	Yellow card	Red card
5	(Kazakhstan)	MF	Ivan Antipov	1	0	0	0	1	0	2	0
6	(Montenegro)	MF	Jovan Nikolić	10	1	0	0	0	0	10	1
7	(Kazakhstan)	MF	Ruslan Valiullin	2	1	0	0	0	0	2	1
9	(Kazakhstan)	FW	Samit Chulagov	0	0	0	0	1	0	1	0
9	(Montenegro)	FW	Marko Đurović	1	0	0	0	0	0	1	0
10	(Colombia)	MF	Jhoan Arenas	2	0	0	0	0	0	2	0
11	(Chile)	FW	Matías Rubio	2	0	0	0	1	0	3	0
12	(Kazakhstan)	MF	Konstantin Zarechny	5	0	0	0	0	0	5	0
13	(Kazakhstan)	DF	Miram Sapanov	3	0	0	0	0	0	3	0
14	(Kazakhstan)	DF	Bauyrzhan Omarov	2	0	0	0	1	0	3	0
15	(Kazakhstan)	DF	Dmitri Schmidt	4	0	0	0	0	0	4	0
16	(Paraguay)	MF	Freddy Coronel	3	0	0	0	0	0	3	0
19	(Kazakhstan)	MF	Azat Ersalimov	3	0	0	0	0	0	3	0
20	(Nigeria)	DF	Michael Odibe	5	0	0	0	0	0	5	0
25	(Nigeria)	FW	Izu Azuka	1	0	0	0	0	0	1	0
27	(Kazakhstan)	DF	Andrey Shabaev	4	0	0	0	0	0	4	0
28	(Kazakhstan)	MF	Yuriy Pertsukh	5	0	0	0	0	0	5	0
30	(Croatia)	MF	Denis Glavina	2	0	0	0	0	0	2	0
32	(Kazakhstan)	GK	Denis Tolebaev	3	0	0	0	0	0	3	0
54	(Ukraine)	FW	Kostyantyn Dudchenko	2	0	1	0	0	0	3	0
55	(Serbia)	MF	Predrag Govedarica	9	0	0	0	0	0	9	0
			TOTALS	69	2	1	0	4	0	74	2
