= 2018 FC Astana season =

FC Astana
2018 season
- Chairman: Sayan Khamitzhanov
- Manager: Stanimir Stoilov (until 1 March); Grigori Babayan (Interim) (1 March-1 June); Roman Hryhorchuk (from 1 June); Grigori Babayan (Interim) (from 17 August)
- Stadium: Astana Arena
- Premier League: 1st
- Kazakhstan Cup: Last 16 vs Makhtaaral
- Super Cup: Winners
- 2017–18 Europa League: Round of 16 vs Sporting CP
- 2018–19 Champions League: Third-qualifying round vs Dinamo Zagreb
- 2018–19 Europa League: Group Stage
- Top goalscorer: League: Marin Tomasov (14); All: Marin Tomasov (19)
- Highest home attendance: 29,737 vs Sporting CP (15 February 2018)
Home colours	Away colours	Third colours

The 2018 FC Astana season is the tenth successive season that the club will play in the Kazakhstan Premier League, the highest tier of association football in Kazakhstan. Astana are defending Kazakhstan Premier League Champions, having been crowned Champions for the fourth time the previous season. Astana will continue in the UEFA Europa League having finished second in their group at the end of the 2017 season. In the summer Astana will enter the Champions League, at the Second Qualifying Stage, and the Kazakhstan Cup.

== Season events ==
On 8 January, Stoilov signed a new contract with Astana, but left to take over the vacant Kazakhstan nation team Managers position on 1 March, with Grigori Babayan being announced as his interim replacement on the same day. On 1 June 2018, Astana announced Roman Hryhorchuk as the club's new manager.

On 25 June, FC Tambov announced that Marat Bystrov had left to join Astana on a three-year contract, whilst also being rented to FC Tobol until the end of the 2018 season.

Igor Shitov left Astana on 3 July after his contract was not renewed, with Astana signing Antonio Rukavina and Richard Almeida the following day.

On 12 July, Astana announced that Junior Kabananga had re-joined Astana on a year-long loan deal from Al-Nassr.

On 14 July, Astana announced that Pedro Henrique had joined Astana on a year-long loan deal from PAOK.

On 20 July, Astana announced the signing of Rangelo Janga from KAA Gent.

On 23 July, Astana announced that Đorđe Despotović and Marko Stanojević had both left the club.

On 27 July, Astana confirmed that their all-time leading goalscorer Patrick Twumasi had moved to La Liga club Deportivo Alavés, the following day Yuriy Pertsukh was loaned to Atyrau.

On 17 August, Hryhorchuk left Astana on compassionate leave with Grigori Babayan again stepping in as Caretaker Manager.

== Squad ==
As of match played 13 December 2018

No.	Name	Nationality	Position	Date of birth (age)	Signed from	Signed in	Apps.	Goals
Goalkeepers
1	Nenad Erić	(Kazakhstan)	GK	26 May 1982 (aged 36)	Kairat	2011	258	0
35	Aleksandr Mokin	(Kazakhstan)	GK	19 June 1981 (aged 37)	Shakhter Karagandy	2016	57	0
53	Stanislav Pavlov	(Kazakhstan)	GK	30 May 1994 (aged 24)	Tobol	2018	2	0
85	Oleg Medvedev	(Kazakhstan)	GK	21 March 2000 (aged 18)	Academy	2016	0	0
90	Vladislav Sayenko	(Kazakhstan)	GK	4 June 2000 (aged 18)	Academy	2016	0	0
Defenders
2	Antonio Rukavina	(Serbia)	DF	26 January 1984 (aged 34)	Villarreal	2018	17	0
5	Marin Aničić	(Bosnia and Herzegovina)	DF	17 August 1989 (aged 29)	Zrinjski Mostar	2014	194	9
15	Abzal Beisebekov	(Kazakhstan)	DF	30 November 1992 (aged 26)	Vostok	2012	242	5
25	Serhiy Malyi	(Kazakhstan)	DF	5 June 1990 (aged 28)	Irtysh Pavlodar	2016	43	3
27	Yuriy Logvinenko	(Kazakhstan)	DF	22 July 1988 (aged 30)	Aktobe	2016	99	9
33	Alim Ilyasov	(Kazakhstan)	DF	22 June 2000 (aged 18)	Academy	2016	2	0
44	Yevgeny Postnikov	(Kazakhstan)	DF	16 April 1986 (aged 32)	Shakhtyor Soligorsk	2014	162	3
49	Dauren Iskakov	(Kazakhstan)	DF	25 April 1999 (aged 19)	Academy	2017	1	0
55	Talgat Kusyapov	(Kazakhstan)	DF	14 February 1999 (aged 19)	Academy	2016	2	0
57	Kashken Dinmuhammed	(Kazakhstan)	DF	4 January 2000 (aged 18)	Academy	2016	0	0
66	Samat Bortay	(Kazakhstan)	DF	1 June 1999 (aged 19)	Academy	2018	1	0
68	Danijar Kushekbaev	(Kazakhstan)	DF	11 September 1999 (aged 19)	Academy	2018	1	0
69	Yuri Akhanov	(Kazakhstan)	DF	31 July 2002 (aged 16)	Academy	2018	0	0
71	Samat Mazhit	(Kazakhstan)	DF	24 March 2000 (aged 18)	Academy	2018	1	0
72	Sanzhar Aitym	(Kazakhstan)	DF	2 March 2000 (aged 18)	Academy	2016	0	0
74	Sagi Sovet	(Kazakhstan)	DF	15 March 2000 (aged 18)	Academy	2016	1	0
75	Adilzhan Dyusembaev	(Kazakhstan)	DF	24 February 2001 (aged 17)	Academy	2018	1	0
77	Dmitri Shomko	(Kazakhstan)	DF	19 March 1990 (aged 28)	Irtysh Pavlodar	2014	213	11
91	Lev Skvortsov	(Kazakhstan)	DF	2 February 2000 (aged 18)	Academy	2018	2	0
93	Zhantore Zhumadilov	(Kazakhstan)	DF	20 January 2000 (aged 18)	Academy	2018	1	0
Midfielders
6	László Kleinheisler	(Hungary)	MF	8 April 1994 (aged 24)	Werder Bremen	2018	54	2
7	Serikzhan Muzhikov	(Kazakhstan)	MF	7 August 1989 (aged 29)	Kaisar	2015	166	16
11	Pedro Henrique	(Brazil)	MF	16 June 1990 (aged 28)	loan from PAOK	2018	19	3
14	Marin Tomasov	(Croatia)	MF	31 August 1987 (aged 31)	Rijeka	2018	66	22
18	Ivan Mayewski	(Belarus)	MF	5 May 1988 (aged 30)	Anzhi Makhachkala	2017	85	5
19	Baktiyar Zaynutdinov	(Kazakhstan)	MF	16 March 1995 (aged 23)	Taraz	2018	35	6
20	Richard Almeida	(Azerbaijan)	MF	20 March 1989 (aged 29)	Qarabağ	2018	19	1
21	Madi Zhakypbayev	(Kazakhstan)	MF	21 March 2000 (aged 18)	Academy	2016	7	0
34	Sayan Mukanov	(Kazakhstan)	MF	6 January 1997 (aged 21)	Academy	2017	1	0
37	Shadiyar Aryntay	(Kazakhstan)	MF	20 September 1999 (aged 19)	Academy	2017	0	0
49	Nurdaulet Mamatov	(Kazakhstan)	MF	4 March 1998 (aged 20)	Academy	2017	0	0
53	Alliyar Baltash	(Kazakhstan)	MF		Academy	2018	0	0
61	Artem Tsoi	(Kazakhstan)	MF	10 February 2000 (aged 18)	Academy	2017	0	0
70	Sultan Sagnayev	(Kazakhstan)	MF	14 January 2000 (aged 18)	Academy	2016	8	0
78	Alisher Saginov	(Kazakhstan)	MF	20 January 1998 (aged 20)	Academy	2016	0	0
79	Ruslan Makhan	(Kazakhstan)	MF	7 January 2000 (aged 18)	Academy	2018	1	0
87	Zhaslan Kairkenov	(Kazakhstan)	MF	27 March 2000 (aged 18)	Academy	2016	2	0
Forwards
30	Junior Kabananga	(Democratic Republic of the Congo)	FW	4 April 1989 (aged 29)	loan from Al-Nassr	2018	112	38
32	Rangelo Janga	(Curaçao)	FW	16 April 1992 (aged 26)	KAA Gent	2018	20	4
45	Roman Murtazayev	(Kazakhstan)	FW	10 September 1993 (aged 25)	Irtysh Pavlodar	2017	84	16
54	Viktor Pron	(Kazakhstan)	FW	23 September 1997 (aged 21)	Academy	2017	2	0
72	Stanislav Basmanov	(Kazakhstan)	FW	24 June 2001 (aged 17)	Academy	2018	1	0
78	Daniil Pichkarev	(Kazakhstan)	FW	10 September 2001 (aged 17)	Academy	2018	1	0
80	Vladislav Prokopenko	(Kazakhstan)	FW	1 July 2000 (aged 18)	Academy	2016	11	1
81	Ramazan Karimov	(Kazakhstan)	FW	5 July 1999 (aged 19)	Academy	2018	2	1
99	Aleksey Shchotkin	(Kazakhstan)	FW	21 May 1991 (aged 27)	Taraz	2015	83	14
Players away on loan
8	Srđan Grahovac	(Bosnia and Herzegovina)	MF	19 September 1992 (aged 26)	Rapid Wien	2018	36	8
28	Yuriy Pertsukh	(Kazakhstan)	MF	13 May 1996 (aged 22)	Akzhayik	2018	7	1
54	Danil Podymksy	(Kazakhstan)	GK	13 May 1993 (aged 25)	Academy	2016	0	0
73	Didar Zhalmukan	(Kazakhstan)	MF	22 May 1996 (aged 22)	Aktobe	2017	19	3
	Marat Bystrov	(Kazakhstan)	DF	19 June 1992 (aged 26)	Tambov	2018	0	0
Left during the season
4	Igor Shitov	(Belarus)	DF	24 October 1986 (aged 32)	Mordovia Saransk	2016	71	1
9	Đorđe Despotović	(Serbia)	FW	4 March 1992 (aged 26)	Red Star Belgrade	2016	78	20
23	Patrick Twumasi	(Ghana)	FW	9 May 1994 (aged 24)	Spartaks Jūrmala	2015	171	69
31	Abay Zhunusov	(Kazakhstan)	MF	15 March 1995 (aged 23)	Academy	2016	6	0
88	Marko Stanojević	(Serbia)	MF	22 June 1988 (aged 30)	Shakhter Karagandy	2018	13	0

=== On loan ===
Note: Flags indicate national team as defined under FIFA eligibility rules; some limited exceptions apply. Players may hold more than one non-FIFA nationality.

No.	Pos.	Nation	Player
8	MF	BIH	Srđan Grahovac (at (Croatia) Rijeka)
28	MF	KAZ	Yuriy Pertsukh (at (Kazakhstan) Atyrau)
54	GK	KAZ	Danil Podymksy (at (Kazakhstan) Altai Semey)

No.	Pos.	Nation	Player
73	MF	KAZ	Didar Zhalmukan (at (Kazakhstan) Atyrau)
—	DF	KAZ	Marat Bystrov (at (Kazakhstan) Tobol)

== Transfers ==
=== In ===
Date	Position	Nationality	Name	From	Fee	Ref.
24 November 2017	MF	(Kazakhstan)	Yuriy Pertsukh	Akzhayik	Undisclosed	
25 November 2017	MF	(Kazakhstan)	Baktiyar Zaynutdinov	Taraz	Undisclosed	
25 December 2017	MF	(Serbia)	Marko Stanojević	Shakhter Karagandy	Undisclosed	
1 January 2018	MF	(Bosnia and Herzegovina)	Srđan Grahovac	Rapid Wien	Undisclosed	
1 January 2018	MF	(Kazakhstan)	Abay Zhunusov	Aktobe	Loan return	
1 January 2018	MF	(Kazakhstan)	Didar Zhalmukan	Tobol	Loan return	
1 January 2018	FW	(Kazakhstan)	Aleksey Shchotkin	Tobol	Loan return	
1 July 2018	DF	(Kazakhstan)	Marat Bystrov	Tambov	Undisclosed	
1 July 2018	MF	(Hungary)	László Kleinheisler	Werder Bremen	Undisclosed	
1 July 2018	MF	(Croatia)	Marin Tomasov	HNK Rijeka	Undisclosed	
4 July 2018	DF	(Serbia)	Antonio Rukavina	Villarreal	Undisclosed	
4 July 2018	MF	(Azerbaijan)	Richard Almeida	Qarabağ	Free	
20 July 2018	FW	(Curaçao)	Rangelo Janga	KAA Gent	Free	
30 January 2018	MF	(Kazakhstan)	Didar Zhalmukan	Aktobe	Loan return	

=== Out ===
Date	Position	Nationality	Name	To	Fee	Ref.
1 January 2018	MF	(Kazakhstan)	Gevorg Najaryan	Shakhter Karagandy	Undisclosed	
9 January 2018	MF	(Kazakhstan)	Askhat Tagybergen	Kaisar	Undisclosed	
24 January 2018	DF	(Kazakhstan)	Berik Shaikhov	Akzhayik	Undisclosed	
31 January 2018	FW	(Democratic Republic of the Congo)	Junior Kabananga	Al-Nassr	Undisclosed	
2 March 2018	GK	(Kazakhstan)	Abylaikhan Duysen	Shakhter Karagandy	Undisclosed	
27 July 2018	FW	(Ghana)	Patrick Twumasi	Deportivo Alavés	Undisclosed	
28 July 2018	MF	(Kazakhstan)	Abay Zhunusov	Akzhayik	Undisclosed	

=== Loans in ===
Date from	Position	Nationality	Name	From	Date to	Ref.
12 July 2018	FW	(Democratic Republic of the Congo)	Junior Kabananga	Al-Nassr	1 July 2019	
14 July 2018	MF	(Brazil)	Pedro Henrique	PAOK	1 July 2019	

=== Loans out ===
Date from	Position	Nationality	Name	To	Date to	Ref.
13 February 2018	MF	(Bosnia and Herzegovina)	Srđan Grahovac	Rijeka	31 December 2018	
21 February 2018	MF	(Kazakhstan)	Didar Zhalmukan	Ordabasy	2 April 2018	
2 April 2018	MF	(Kazakhstan)	Didar Zhalmukan	Aktobe	31 December 2018	
2 July 2018	DF	(Kazakhstan)	Marat Bystrov	Tobol	End of season	
28 July 2018	MF	(Kazakhstan)	Yuriy Pertsukh	Atyrau	End of season	
31 July 2018	MF	(Kazakhstan)	Didar Zhalmukan	Atyrau	End of season	
	GK	(Kazakhstan)	Danil Podymksy	Altai Semey	End of Season	

=== Released ===
Date	Position	Nationality	Name	Joined	Date	Ref.
31 December 2017	FW	(Albania)	Azdren Llullaku	Virtus Entella	13 February 2018	
3 July 2018	DF	(Belarus)	Igor Shitov	Dinamo Minsk	16 July 2018	
23 July 2018	MF	(Serbia)	Marko Stanojević	Levadiakos		
23 July 2018	FW	(Serbia)	Đorđe Despotović	Orenburg	31 August 2018	
31 December 2018	GK	(Kazakhstan)	Aleksandr Mokin	Irtysh Pavlodar	4 January 2019	
31 December 2018	MF	(Bosnia and Herzegovina)	Srđan Grahovac	Rapid Wien	15 January 2019	
31 December 2018	DF	(Kazakhstan)	Alim Ilyasov			
31 December 2018	DF	(Kazakhstan)	Dauren Iskakov			
31 December 2018	DF	(Kazakhstan)	Kashken Dinmuhammed			
31 December 2018	DF	(Kazakhstan)	Samat Bortay			
31 December 2018	DF	(Kazakhstan)	Danijar Kushekbaev			
31 December 2018	DF	(Kazakhstan)	Yuri Akhanov			
31 December 2018	DF	(Kazakhstan)	Samat Mazhit			
31 December 2018	DF	(Kazakhstan)	Sanzhar Aitym			
31 December 2018	DF	(Kazakhstan)	Adilzhan Dyusembaev			
31 December 2018	DF	(Kazakhstan)	Zhantore Zhumadilov			
31 December 2018	MF	(Kazakhstan)	Sayan Mukanov			
31 December 2018	MF	(Kazakhstan)	Shadiyar Aryntay			
31 December 2018	MF	(Kazakhstan)	Nurdaulet Mamatov			
31 December 2018	MF	(Kazakhstan)	Alliyar Baltash			
31 December 2018	MF	(Kazakhstan)	Artem Tsoi			
31 December 2018	MF	(Kazakhstan)	Alisher Saginov			
31 December 2018	MF	(Kazakhstan)	Ruslan Makhan			
31 December 2018	FW	(Kazakhstan)	Viktor Pron			
31 December 2018	FW	(Kazakhstan)	Daniil Pichkarev			

== Friendlies ==
22 January 2018	Astana (Kazakhstan)	3–2	(Russia) Spartak Moscow	United Arab Emirates
15:00 (UTC+6)	Stanojević 19'; Tomasov 33'; Despotović 75'	Report	Promes 79' (pen.); Pedro Rocha 89'

26 January 2018	Astana (Kazakhstan)	3–1	(Russia) Krasnodar	Abu-Dhabi, United Arab Emirates
(UTC+6)	Malyi 9'; Tomasov 24', 44'	Report	Claesson 35'	Stadium: New York University Abu Dhabi

29 January 2018	Astana (Kazakhstan)	0–1	(Slovakia) ŠK Žilina	Dubai, United Arab Emirates
(UTC+6)		Report	Jánošík 48'

4 February 2018	Astana (Kazakhstan)	0–2	(Sweden) BK Häcken	Dubai, United Arab Emirates
(UTC+6)		Report	Lundberg 3'; Berggren 72'

6 February 2018	Astana (Kazakhstan)	6–0	(China) Liaoning Whowin	Dubai, United Arab Emirates
18:00 (UTC+6)	Pertsukh 33'; B.Zaynutdinov 36'; Shchotkin 42'; Murtazayev 44'; Despotović 89'; Tomasov 90'	Report

8 February 2018	Astana (Kazakhstan)	3–0	(China) Shandong Luneng Taishan	Dubai, United Arab Emirates
17:00 (UTC+6)	Logvinenko 26'; Despotović 67'; Pertsukh 90+1'	Report

11 February 2018	Astana	11–0	Bolat	Astana
(UTC+6)	Despotović; Kleinheisler; Twumasi; Shomko; Murtazayev; Stanojević; Pertsukh; B.Zaynutdinov	Report		Stadium: Astana Arena

== Competitions ==
=== UEFA Europa League ===
==== Knockout phase ====
15 February 2018 Round of 32 1st leg	Astana (Kazakhstan)	1–3	(Portugal) Sporting CP	Astana, Kazakhstan
22:00 (UTC+6)	Tomasov 7'; Logvinenko (yellow card) 4762' (yellow-red card); Beisebekov (yellow card) 80'; Mayewski (yellow card) 81'	Report	Coates (yellow card) 25'; Fernandes 48' (pen.); Gelson 50'; Doumbia 56'; Carvalho (yellow card) 76'	Stadium: Astana Arena; Attendance: 29,737; Referee: Ruddy Buquet (France)

23 February 2018 Round of 32 2nd leg	Sporting CP (Portugal)	3–3 (6–3 agg.)	(Kazakhstan) Astana	Lisbon, Portugal
00:00 (UTC+6)	Dost 3'; Fernandes 53', 63'	Report	Tomasov 37'; Kleinheisler (yellow card) 59'; Twumasi 80'; Shomko 90+4'	Stadium: Estádio José Alvalade; Referee: Tamás Bognár (Hungary)

=== Super Cup ===
4 March 2018	Astana	3–0	Kairat	Astana
15:00 (UTC+6)	Muzhikov (yellow card) 55'; Mayewski 59'; Tomasov 62', 67'	Report	Gogoua (yellow card) 58'	Stadium: Astana Arena; Attendance: 12,500; Referee: Artyom Kuchin

=== Premier League ===
==== Results summary ====
Overall								Home						Away					
Pld	W	D	L	GF	GA	GD	Pts	W	D	L	GF	GA	GD	W	D	L	GF	GA	GD
33	24	5	4	66	22	+44	77	14	3	0	41	8	+33	10	2	4	25	14	+11

Last updated: 11 November 2018.
Source: See Results

==== Results by round ====
Round	1	2	3	4	5	6	7	8	9	10	11	12	13	14	15	16	17	18	19	20	21	22	23	24	25	26	27	28	29	30	31	32	33
Ground	H	A	H	A	H	A	A	H	A	H	A	H	A	H	A	H	A	H	A	H	H	A	H	H	A	A	H	A	H	A	A	H	H
Result	W	W	W	W	D	W	W	W	L	W	W	W	L	W	W	W	W	W	D	W	W	D	W	D	W	W	W	W	D	L	L	W	W
Position	1	1	1	1	1	1	1	1	1	1	1	1	1	1	1	1	1	1	1	1	1	1	1	1	1	1	1	1	1	1	1	1	1

Source: See Results
A = Away; H = Home; W = Win; D = Draw; L = Loss

==== Results ====
11 March 2018 1	Astana	3–0	Akzhayik	Astana
16:00 (UTC+6)	Tomasov 9'; Muzhikov (yellow card) 50' (goal) 80'; Malyi 75'; B.Zaynutdinov (yellow card) 85'	Report	Eseola (yellow card) 56'	Stadium: Astana Arena; Attendance: 2,000; Referee: Bakhyt Kyzylbaev

17 March 2018 2	Zhetysu	0–2	Astana	Taldykorgan
15:00 (UTC+6)	Kozhamberdi (yellow card) 83'	Report	Twumasi 28'; Shchotkin 45+3'	Stadium: Zhetysu Reserve Stadium; Attendance: 1,000; Referee: Bagdat Abdullaev

31 March 2018 3	Astana	2–0	Kaisar	Astana
16:00 (UTC+6)	Twumasi 9'; Murtazayev 15'; Tomasov (yellow card) 63'	Report	Coureur (yellow card) 12'; Korobkin (yellow card) 76'; Graf (yellow card) 81'	Stadium: Astana Arena; Attendance: 3,500; Referee: Igor Chesnokov

7 April 2018 4	Irtysh Pavlodar	1–6	Astana	Pavlodar
15:00 (UTC+6)	I.Kalinin (yellow card) 73'; Hernández 90'	Report	Zaynutdinov 39', 50', 61'; Murtazayev 65'; Pertsukh 70'; Tomasov 88'	Stadium: Central Stadium; Referee: Daniyar Sakhi

14 April 2018 5	Astana	1–1	Kairat	Astana
15:00 (UTC+6)	Zaynutdinov 52' (yellow card) 74'; Shomko (yellow card) 88'; Tomasov (yellow card) 90+5'; Kleinheisler (yellow card) 90+5'	Report	Silveira (yellow card) 40'; Suyumbayev (yellow card) 60'; Arshavin 71' (yellow card) 90+5'; Kuat (yellow card) 72'; Abiken (yellow card) 90+5'	Stadium: Astana Arena; Attendance: 12,000; Referee: Artyom Kuchin

22 April 2018 6	Ordabasy	1–2	Astana	Shymkent
17:00 (UTC+6)	Tungyshbayev 44'; Jighauri (yellow card) 85'; Diakate (yellow card) 89'	Report	Beisebekov (yellow card) 23'; Mayewski (yellow card) 27'; Shchotkin 29', 38'; Kleinheisler (yellow card) 32'; Malyi (yellow card) 51'; Stanojević (yellow card) 90+1'	Stadium: Kazhymukan Munaitpasov Stadium; Attendance: 14,700; Referee: Aydin Rakhimbayev

25 April 2018 19	Kyzylzhar	0–2	Astana	Petropavl
15:00 (UTC+6)	Coronel (yellow card) 43'; T.Muldinov (yellow card) 74'	Report	Malyi (yellow card) 50'; Aničić (yellow card) 70'; Twumasi 80', 90+3' (yellow card) 80'	Stadium: Karasai Stadium; Attendance: 3,000; Referee: Bagdat Abdullaev

29 April 2018 7	Astana	1–0	Tobol	Astana
17:00 (UTC+6)	Zaynutdinov (yellow card) 37'; Twumasi 67' (pen.)	Report	Kassaï (yellow card) 34'; Nurgaliev (yellow card) 41'; Dmitrenko (yellow card) 61'; Nusserbayev (yellow card) 66'	Stadium: Astana Arena; Attendance: 4,000; Referee: Bolat Saryev

5 May 2018 8	Shakhter Karagandy	1–0	Astana	Temirtau
16:00 (UTC+6)	Najaryan (yellow card) 15'; Shakhmetov (yellow card) 60'; Kojašević 70'; Mihunov (yellow card) 86'	Report	Muzhikov (yellow card) 78'; Postnikov (yellow card) 90+1'	Stadium: Metallurg Stadium; Attendance: 1,500; Referee: Grigory Moskovchenko

9 May 2018 9	Astana	2–0	Kyzylzhar	Astana
18:00 (UTC+6)	Postnikov (yellow card) 58'; Despotović 79'; Tomasov 82'	Report	O.Altayev (yellow card) 8'	Stadium: Astana Arena; Attendance: 2,500; Referee: Sergey Gorokhovodatskiy

13 May 2018 10	Atyrau	0–2	Astana	Atyrau
18:30 (UTC+6)	Khairullin (yellow card) 32'; A.Saparov (yellow card) 32'	Report	Kleinheisler (yellow card) 32'; Malyi (yellow card) 36'; Twumasi 61' (pen.); Tomasov 64'; Despotović (yellow card) 70'	Stadium: Tomarly Stadion; Attendance: 2,000; Referee: Bolat Karlibayev

19 May 2018 11	Astana	3–1	Aktobe	Astana
17:00 (UTC+6)	Despotović 1'; Tomasov 7'; Mayewski (yellow card) 44'; Shomko 68'	Report	Reynaldo 17' (yellow card) 48'	Stadium: Astana Arena; Attendance: 7,000; Referee: Askhat Abdanbayev

23 May 2018 22	Akzhayik	3–0	Astana	Oral
18:00 (UTC+6)	Khudobyak 4'; E.Tapalov (yellow card) 39'; M.Sapanov (yellow card) 47'; Mané 54'; Eseola 85' (yellow card) 86'	Report	Mayewski (yellow card) 15'; Beisebekov (yellow card) 50'	Stadium: Petr Atoyan Stadium; Attendance: 2,500; Referee: Igor Chesnokov

27 May 2018 12	Astana	3–0	Zhetysu	Astana
18:00 (UTC+6)	Twumasi 26'; Glavina 46' (o.g.); Kleinheisler (yellow card) 53'; Shomko (yellow card) 68'; Tomasov 74'	Report		Stadium: Astana Arena; Attendance: 2,500; Referee: Furkat Atajanov

31 May 2018 13	Kaisar	0–2	Astana	Kyzylorda
18:00 (UTC+6)	Lamanje (yellow card) 16'	Report	Despotović (yellow card) 19'; Twumasi 22'; Muzhikov (yellow card) 41' (goal) 65'	Stadium: Gani Muratbayev Stadium; Attendance: 3,500; Referee: Denis Tevyashov

17 June 2018 14	Astana	3–0	Irtysh Pavlodar	Astana
17:00 (UTC+6)	Kleinheisler (yellow card) 21'; Murtazayev 40', 67'; Despotović 60'	Report	Fonseca (yellow card) 55'	Stadium: Astana Arena; Attendance: 5,000; Referee: Artyom Kuchin

24 June 2018 15	Kairat	1–2	Astana	Almaty
20:30 (UTC+6)	Kuat 30' (yellow card) 63'; Juan Felipe (yellow card) 54'	Report	Despotović 45+2' (yellow card) 90+3'; Shomko (yellow card) 52'; Mayewski (yellow card) 54'; Murtazayev 88'	Stadium: Central Stadium; Attendance: 19,200; Referee: Bagdat Abdullaev

30 June 2018 16	Astana	5–3	Ordabasy	Astana
16:00 (UTC+6)	Postnikov (yellow card) 10'; Murtazayev 34', 36'; Shomko 45+1'; Logvinenko (yellow card) 71'; Shchotkin 90+1'; Despotović 90+5'	Report	Diakate 9' (pen.); Fontanello (yellow card) 22'; Bertoglio 54' (yellow card) 89'; Bocharov 82'; V.Li (yellow card) 90+2'	Stadium: Astana Arena; Attendance: 6,000; Referee: Grigory Moskovchenko

5 July 2018 17	Tobol	0–0	Astana	Kostanay
18:00 (UTC+6)	Nusserbayev (yellow card) 45'; Turysbek (yellow card) 59'	Report	Muzhikov (yellow card) 16'; Aničić (yellow card) 19'; Kleinheisler (yellow card) 89'	Stadium: Central Stadium; Attendance: 2,500; Referee: Daniyar Sakhi

14 July 2018 18	Astana	2–0	Shakhter Karagandy	Astana
20:00 (UTC+6)	Shchotkin 44'; Tomasov 82'	Report	K.Pasichnik (yellow card) 54'; Chichulin (yellow card) 90'	Stadium: Astana Arena; Attendance: 2,000; Referee: Bakhyt Kyzylbaev

28 July 2018 20	Astana	2–0	Atyrau	Astana
19:00 (UTC+6)	Logvinenko 2'; Malyi 62'	Report	Ablitarov (yellow card) 49'	Stadium: Astana Arena; Attendance: 2,500; Referee: Bolat Saryev

4 August 2018 21	Aktobe	1–1	Astana	Aktobe
21:00 (UTC+6)	Simčević 54'; Marjanović (yellow card) 57'; Pizzelli (yellow card) 73'	Report	Beisebekov (yellow card) 27'; S.Sagnayev (yellow card) 34'; Janga 36'	Stadium: Central Stadium; Attendance: 12,800; Referee: Saken Bayimbet

18 August 2018 23	Shakhter Karagandy	–	Astana	Karaganda
(UTC+6)				Stadium: Shakhter Stadium
Note: Match played on 31 October 2018

26 August 2018 24	Astana	3–0	Kyzylzhar	Astana
20:00 (UTC+6)	Shchotkin 13', 41', 72'; S.Sagnayev (yellow card) 67'	Report	Drachenko (yellow card) 23'; A.Shabaev (yellow card) 42'; Stetsenko (yellow card) 52'; Ceesay (yellow card) 73'	Stadium: Astana Arena; Attendance: 1,200; Referee: Anatolyi Vishnichenko

16 September 2018 26	Astana	0–0	Kaisar	Astana
19:00 (UTC+6)		Report	Tagybergen (yellow card) 34'; Graf (yellow card) 57'; Were (yellow card) 63'; D.Yevstigneyev (yellow card) 90+3'	Stadium: Astana Arena; Attendance: 4,000; Referee: Grigory Moskovchenko

23 September 2018 27	Akzhayik	1–2	Astana	Oral
18:00 (UTC+6)	Basov (yellow card) 23'; Karašausks 37'	Report	Richard 23' (pen.); Shchotkin 26'; Beisebekov (yellow card) 38'; Muzhikov (yellow card) 69'	Stadium: Petr Atoyan Stadium; Attendance: 3,500; Referee: Askhat Abdanbayev

26 September 2018 25	Atyrau	0–1	Astana	Atyrau
18:30 (UTC+6)	E.Abdrakhmanov (yellow card) 50'; Kubík (yellow card) 54'; A.Nurybekov (yellow card) 84'; Obšivač (yellow card) 85'	Report	Henrique (yellow card) 48'; Shchotkin 87' (pen.)	Stadium: Munaishy Stadium; Attendance: 4,000; Referee: Bagdat Abdullaev

30 September 2018 28	Astana	3–0	Zhetysu	Astana
18:00 (UTC+6)	Janga 38'; Tomasov 85', 87'	Report	Mawutor (yellow card) 43'	Stadium: Astana Arena; Attendance: 2,500; Referee: Bolat Karlibayev

7 October 2018 29	Aktobe	1–2	Astana	Aktobe
19:00 (UTC+6)	S.Zhumagali 55'; A.Kakimov (yellow card) 58'	Report	Janga 42'; Murtazayev (yellow card) 54'; Malyi (yellow card) 60'; Muzhikov 62'	Stadium: Central Stadium; Attendance: 11,000; Referee: Denis Tevyashov

20 October 2018 30	Astana	1–1	Ordabasy	Astana
19:00 (UTC+6)	Tomasov 53'	Report	Kovalchuk (yellow card) 19'; Dosmagambetov (yellow card) 21'; Moldakaraev 55'; B.Shayzada (yellow card) 90+3'	Stadium: Astana Arena; Attendance: 1,700; Referee: Igor Chesnokov

28 October 2018 31	Tobol	1–0	Astana	Kostanay
16:00 (UTC+6)	Fedin (yellow card) 40'; Nurgaliev 59' (yellow card) 79'	Report	Mayewski (yellow card) 42'; Muzhikov (yellow card) 76'	Stadium: Central Stadium; Attendance: 4,000; Referee: Saken Bayimbet

31 October 2018 23	Shakhter Karagandy	3–1	Astana	Karaganda
19:00 (UTC+6)	Omirtayev 21', 27', 38'	Report	S.Sagnayev (yellow card) 60'; Prokopenko (yellow card) 65'; Karimov 85'	Stadium: Shakhter Stadium; Attendance: 1,000; Referee: Furkat Atajanov
Note: Match originally scheduled for 18 August 2018

3 November 2018 32	Astana	3–2	Kairat	Astana
17:00 (UTC+6)	Rukavina (yellow card) 23'; Tomasov 35'; Zaynutdinov 39'; Murtazayev 61' (yellow card) 90+3'; Mayewski (yellow card) 90+1'	Report	Sarsenov (yellow card) 14'; Paragulgov 22'; Kuat (yellow card) 29'; Vorogovskiy (yellow card) 37'; Eseola 60'; Akhmetov (yellow card) 87'; Alip (yellow card) 90+1'	Stadium: Astana Arena; Attendance: 3,200; Referee: Artyom Kuchin

11 November 2018 33	Astana	4–0	Irtysh Pavlodar	Astana
15:00 (UTC+6)	Tomasov 21', 65', 68'; Zaynutdinov (yellow card) 25'; Janga 51'	Report	Fonseca (yellow card) 59'; Camará (yellow card) 90+2'	Stadium: Astana Arena; Attendance: 3,000; Referee: Aydin Rakhimbayev

==== League table ====
Pos	Team	Pld	W	D	L	GF	GA	GD	Pts	Qualification or relegation
1	Astana (C)	33	24	5	4	66	22	+44	77	Qualification for the Champions League first qualifying round
2	Kairat	33	19	5	9	60	33	+27	62	Qualification for the Europa League first qualifying round (Note: Since the winners of 2018 Kazakhstan Cup, Kairat, qualified for European competition based on their league position, the spot awarded to the Cup winner (Europa League first qualifying round) was passed to the next best-placed team (the fourth-placed team).)
3	Tobol	33	15	8	10	36	30	+6	53	Qualification for the Europa League first qualifying round
4	Ordabasy	33	13	7	13	38	44	−6	46	Qualification for the Europa League first qualifying round
5	Kaisar	33	11	12	10	35	31	+4	45	

Source: UEFA, Soccerway
Rules for classification: 1) Points; 2) Goal difference; 3) Matches won; 4) Goals scored; 5) Away goals scored; 6) Head-to-head points; 7) Head-to-head matches won; 8) Head-to-head goal difference; 9) Head-to-head goals scored; 10) Head-to-head away goals scored; 11) Draw.
(C) Champions

=== Kazakhstan Cup ===
18 April 2018 Last 16	Makhtaaral	3–1	Astana	Zhetisay
16:00 (UTC+6)	Oleg Pasechenko (yellow card) 35'; Elmar Nabiev (yellow card) 39' (goal) 80'; Geysar Alekperzade 42'; Askar Abutsov 57' (yellow card) 63'	Report	S.Sovet (yellow card) 64' Prokopenko 86'	Stadium: Kazhymukan Munaitpasov Stadium; Attendance: 3,500; Referee: Grigory Moskovchenko

=== UEFA Champions League ===
==== Qualifying rounds ====
11 July 2018 First qualifying round 1st leg	Astana (Kazakhstan)	1–0	(Montenegro) Sutjeska Nikšić	Astana, Kazakhstan
20:00 (UTC+6)	Aničić (yellow card) 12'; Murtazayev 29' (pen.)	Report	Mi.Vučić (yellow card) 45'; Bulatović (yellow card) 62'; Cicmil (yellow card) 73'	Stadium: Astana Arena; Attendance: 20,500; Referee: Ferenc Karakó (Hungary)

19 July 2018 First qualifying round 2nd leg	Sutjeska Nikšić (Montenegro)	0–2 (0–3 agg.)	(Kazakhstan) Astana	Nikšić, Montenegro
00:00 (UTC+6)	N.Nedić (yellow card) 52'; Merdović (yellow card) 55'	Report	Despotović 38'; Muzhikov 65'	Stadium: Gradski stadion Attendance: 3,200; Referee: João Pinheiro (Portugal)

24 July 2018 Second qualifying round 1st leg	Astana (Kazakhstan)	2–1	(Denmark) Midtjylland	Astana, Kazakhstan
20:00 (UTC+6)	Kleinheisler 31', 90+4'; Richard (yellow card) 81'	Report	Sanneh (yellow card) 19'; Wikheim 51'; Poulsen (yellow card) 70'	Stadium: Astana Arena; Attendance: 23,010; Referee: Radu Petrescu (Romania)

1 August 2018 Second qualifying round 2nd leg	Midtjylland (Denmark)	0–0 (1–2 agg.)	(Kazakhstan) Astana	Herning, Denmark
23:00 (UTC+6)	Sparv (yellow card) 47'; Korcsmár (yellow card) 59'; Mabil (yellow card) 80'; Okosun (yellow card) 90+6'	Report	Aničić (yellow card) 65'; Mayewski (yellow card) 81'; Muzhikov (yellow card) 90'; Postnikov (yellow card) 90+6'	Stadium: MCH Arena; Attendance: 8,731; Referee: Juan Martínez Munuera (Spain)

7 August 2018 Third qualifying round 1st leg	Astana (Kazakhstan)	0–2	(Croatia) Dinamo Zagreb	Astana, Kazakhstan
20:00 (UTC+6)	Mayewski (yellow card) 50'	Report	Hajrović (yellow card) 36'; Budimir 39'; Stojanović (yellow card) 41'; Gojak (yellow card) 70'; Olmo 84'	Stadium: Astana Arena; Attendance: 26,500; Referee: John Beaton (Scotland)

15 August 2018 Third qualifying round 2nd leg	Dinamo Zagreb (Croatia)	1–0 (3–0 agg.)	(Kazakhstan) Astana	Zagreb, Croatia
00:00 (UTC+6)	Gavranović 74'	Report	Postnikov (yellow card) 44'; Malyi (yellow card) 55'	Stadium: Stadion Maksimir; Referee: Gediminas Mažeika (Lithuania)

=== UEFA Europa League ===
==== Qualifying rounds ====
23 August 2018 Playoff round 1st leg	APOEL (Cyprus)	1–0	(Kazakhstan) Astana	Nicosia, Cyprus
23:00 (UTC+6)	Caju 79'; Lucas Souza (yellow card) 84'	Report	Kleinheisler (yellow card) 55'; Henrique (yellow card) 66'; Rukavina (yellow card) 86'	Stadium: GSP Stadium; Referee: Daniel Siebert (Germany)

30 August 2018 Playoff round 2nd leg	Astana (Kazakhstan)	1–0 (1–0 agg.) (2–1 p)	(Cyprus) APOEL	Astana, Kazakhstan
20:00 (UTC+6)	Muzhikov (yellow card) 13'; Henrique 16' (pen.) (yellow card) 108'; Richard (yellow card) 57'; Shomko (yellow card) 74'; Aničić (yellow card) 98'	Report	Carlão (yellow card) 16'; Sallai (yellow card) 18'	Stadium: Astana Arena; Referee: Jakob Kehlet (Denmark)
	Penalties
	Richard (penalty scored); Aničić (penalty missed); Henrique (penalty scored); Beisebekov (penalty missed)		(penalty scored) Nuno Morais; (penalty missed) De Vincenti; (penalty missed) Efrem; (penalty missed) Dellatorre; (penalty missed) Souza

==== Group stage ====
Pos	Team	Pld	W	D	L	GF	GA	GD	Pts	Qualification
1	(Ukraine) Dynamo Kyiv	6	3	2	1	10	7	+3	11	Advance to knockout phase
2	(France) Rennes	6	3	0	3	7	8	−1	9	Advance to knockout phase
3	(Kazakhstan) Astana	6	2	2	2	7	7	0	8	
4	(Czech Republic) Jablonec	6	1	2	3	6	8	−2	5	

Source: UEFA
Rules for classification: Group stage tiebreakers

20 September 2018 1	Dynamo Kyiv (Ukraine)	2–2	(Kazakhstan) Astana	Kyiv, Ukraine
22:55 (UTC+6)	Tsyhankov 11'; Burda (yellow card) 42'; Harmash 45+1'; Rusyn (yellow card) 81'	Report	Aničić 21'; Murtazayev 90+5'	Stadium: NSC Olimpiyskiy Stadium; Attendance: 21,783; Referee: Halis Özkahya (Turkey)

4 October 2018 2	Astana (Kazakhstan)	2–0	(France) Rennes	Astana, Kazakhstan
20:50 (UTC+6)	Zaynutdinov (yellow card) 37' (goal) 64'; Muzhikov (yellow card) 88'; Henrique (yellow card) 89'; Erić (yellow card) 89'; Tomasov 90+1'	Report	Niang (yellow card) 41'; Bensebaini (yellow card) 61'	Stadium: Astana Arena; Attendance: 25,302; Referee: Mattias Gestranius (Finland)

26 October 2018 3	Jablonec (Czech Republic)	1–1	(Kazakhstan) Astana	Jablonec nad Nisou, Czech Republic
01:00 (UTC+6)	Považanec 4'; Trávník (yellow card) 80'; Ikaunieks (yellow card) 86'	Report	Pedro Henrique 11' (yellow card) 31'; Kleinheisler (yellow card) 49'; Richard (yellow card) 76'; Muzhikov (yellow card) 78'	Stadium: Stadion Střelnice; Attendance: 4,909; Referee: Robert Schörgenhofer (Austria)

8 November 2018 4	Astana (Kazakhstan)	2–1	(Czech Republic) Jablonec	Astana, Kazakhstan
21:50 (UTC+6)	Pedro Henrique 18' (yellow card) 55'; Postnikov 88'	Report	Jovović (yellow card) 28'; Zaynutdinov 41' (o.g.)	Stadium: Astana Arena; Attendance: 20,092; Referee: István Vad (Hungary)

29 November 2018 5	Astana (Kazakhstan)	0–1	(Ukraine) Dynamo Kyiv	Astana, Kazakhstan
21:50 (UTC+6)	Postnikov (yellow card) 32'; Kleinheisler (yellow card) 87'	Report	Verbič 29'; Tchê Tchê (yellow card) 90'; Harmash (yellow card) 90+3'	Stadium: Astana Arena; Attendance: 26,508; Referee: Ivan Bebek (Croatia)

13 December 2018 6	Rennes (France)	2–0	(Kazakhstan) Astana	Rennes, France
23:55 (UTC+6)	Bourigeaud (penalty missed) 68'; Sarr 68', 73'	Report	Zaynutdinov (yellow card) 52'; Aničić (yellow card) 67'	Stadium: Roazhon Park; Attendance: 24,535; Referee: Serdar Gözübüyük (Netherlands)

== Squad statistics ==
As of match played 13 December 2018

=== Appearances and goals ===
No.	Pos	Nat	Player	Total		Premier League		Kazakhstan Cup		Super Cup		Champions League		2017–18 Europa League		2018–19 Europa League	
No.	Pos	Nat	Player	Apps	Goals	Apps	Goals	Apps	Goals	Apps	Goals	Apps	Goals	Apps	Goals	Apps	Goals
1	GK	(Kazakhstan) KAZ	Nenad Erić	37	0	20	0	0	0	1	0	6	0	2	0	8	0
2	DF	(Serbia) SRB	Antonio Rukavina	17	0	3	0	0	0	0	0	6	0	0	0	8	0
5	DF	(Bosnia and Herzegovina) BIH	Marin Aničić	42	1	27	0	0	0	1	0	5	0	2	0	7	1
6	MF	(Hungary) HUN	László Kleinheisler	44	2	23+5	0	0	0	1	0	6	2	2	0	7	0
7	MF	(Kazakhstan) KAZ	Serikzhan Muzhikov	35	4	15+6	3	0	0	1	0	5+1	1	0	0	2+5	0
11	MF	(Brazil) BRA	Pedro Henrique	19	3	5+3	0	0	0	0	0	4	0	0	0	7	3
14	MF	(Croatia) CRO	Marin Tomasov	47	19	26+4	14	0	0	1	2	6	0	2	2	8	1
15	DF	(Kazakhstan) KAZ	Abzal Beisebekov	34	0	24+4	0	0	0	1	0	0	0	2	0	0+3	0
18	MF	(Belarus) BLR	Ivan Mayewski	42	1	21+4	0	0	0	1	1	6	0	2	0	8	0
19	MF	(Kazakhstan) KAZ	Baktiyar Zaynutdinov	35	6	17+10	5	0	0	0	0	0+2	0	0	0	5+1	1
20	MF	(Azerbaijan) AZE	Richard Almeida	19	1	5+3	1	0	0	0	0	1+3	0	0	0	6+1	0
21	MF	(Kazakhstan) KAZ	Madi Zhakypbayev	1	0	1	0	0	0	0	0	0	0	0	0	0	0
25	DF	(Kazakhstan) KAZ	Serhiy Malyi	20	2	16+1	2	0	0	0	0	1	0	0+1	0	1	0
27	DF	(Kazakhstan) KAZ	Yuriy Logvinenko	20	1	12+4	1	0	0	0	0	0+1	0	1	0	0+2	0
30	FW	(Democratic Republic of the Congo) COD	Junior Kabananga	17	0	5+1	0	0	0	0	0	2+1	0	0	0	8	0
32	FW	(Curaçao) CUW	Rangelo Janga	20	4	8+2	4	0	0	0	0	1+2	0	0	0	0+7	0
33	DF	(Kazakhstan) KAZ	Alim Ilyasov	2	0	1	0	1	0	0	0	0	0	0	0	0	0
34	MF	(Kazakhstan) KAZ	Sayan Mukanov	1	0	0	0	1	0	0	0	0	0	0	0	0	0
35	GK	(Kazakhstan) KAZ	Aleksandr Mokin	13	0	12+1	0	0	0	0	0	0	0	0	0	0	0
44	DF	(Kazakhstan) KAZ	Yevgeny Postnikov	35	1	18+2	0	0	0	1	0	6	0	1	0	7	1
45	FW	(Kazakhstan) KAZ	Roman Murtazayev	40	10	22+6	8	0	0	0	0	3+2	1	0+2	0	1+4	1
49	DF	(Kazakhstan) KAZ	Dauren Iskakov	1	0	1	0	0	0	0	0	0	0	0	0	0	0
53	GK	(Kazakhstan) KAZ	Stanislav Pavlov	2	0	1	0	1	0	0	0	0	0	0	0	0	0
54	FW	(Kazakhstan) KAZ	Viktor Pron	1	0	0	0	0+1	0	0	0	0	0	0	0	0	0
55	DF	(Kazakhstan) KAZ	Talgat Kusyapov	1	0	0	0	1	0	0	0	0	0	0	0	0	0
66	MF	(Kazakhstan) KAZ	Samat Bortay	1	0	0	0	0+1	0	0	0	0	0	0	0	0	0
68	DF	(Kazakhstan) KAZ	Danijar Kushekbaev	1	0	0	0	1	0	0	0	0	0	0	0	0	0
70	MF	(Kazakhstan) KAZ	Sultan Sagnayev	6	0	5	0	1	0	0	0	0	0	0	0	0	0
71	DF	(Kazakhstan) KAZ	Samat Mazhit	1	0	1	0	0	0	0	0	0	0	0	0	0	0
72	FW	(Kazakhstan) KAZ	Stanislav Basmanov	1	0	0+1	0	0	0	0	0	0	0	0	0	0	0
74	DF	(Kazakhstan) KAZ	Sagi Sovet	1	0	0	0	1	0	0	0	0	0	0	0	0	0
75	DF	(Kazakhstan) KAZ	Adilzhan Dyusembaev	1	0	0+1	0	0	0	0	0	0	0	0	0	0	0
77	DF	(Kazakhstan) KAZ	Dmitri Shomko	38	3	22+1	2	0	0	1	0	6	0	2	1	4+2	0
78	FW	(Kazakhstan) KAZ	Daniil Pichkarev	1	0	0+1	0	0	0	0	0	0	0	0	0	0	0
79	MF	(Kazakhstan) KAZ	Ruslan Makhan	1	0	0	0	0+1	0	0	0	0	0	0	0	0	0
80	FW	(Kazakhstan) KAZ	Vladislav Prokopenko	7	0	4+2	0	1	0	0	0	0	0	0	0	0	0
81	FW	(Kazakhstan) KAZ	Ramazan Karimov	2	1	1	1	1	0	0	0	0	0	0	0	0	0
87	MF	(Kazakhstan) KAZ	Zhaslan Kairkenov	2	0	1	0	1	0	0	0	0	0	0	0	0	0
91	FW	(Kazakhstan) KAZ	Lev Skvortsov	2	0	1	0	1	0	0	0	0	0	0	0	0	0
93	DF	(Kazakhstan) KAZ	Zhantore Zhumadilov	1	0	1	0	0	0	0	0	0	0	0	0	0	0
99	FW	(Kazakhstan) KAZ	Aleksey Shchotkin	33	10	10+16	10	0	0	0+1	0	0+5	0	0+1	0	0	0
Players away from Astana on loan:
28	MF	(Kazakhstan) KAZ	Yuriy Pertsukh	7	1	3+3	1	0	0	0+1	0	0	0	0	0	0	0
Players who left Astana during the season:
4	DF	(Belarus) BLR	Igor Shitov	7	0	5	0	0	0	0	0	0	0	2	0	0	0
9	FW	(Serbia) SRB	Đorđe Despotović	20	6	11+4	5	0	0	1	0	2	1	2	0	0	0
23	FW	(Ghana) GHA	Patrick Twumasi	18	9	10+5	8	0	0	1	0	0	0	2	1	0	0
88	MF	(Serbia) SRB	Marko Stanojević	13	0	4+5	0	0	0	0+1	0	0+1	0	0+2	0	0	0

=== Goal scorers ===
Place	Position	Nation	Number	Name	Premier League	Kazakhstan Cup	Super Cup	Champions League	2017–18 Europa League	2018–19 Europa League	Total
1	MF	(Croatia)	14	Marin Tomasov	14	0	2	0	2	1	19
2	FW	(Kazakhstan)	99	Aleksey Shchotkin	10	0	0	0	0	0	10
2	FW	(Kazakhstan)	45	Roman Murtazayev	8	0	0	1	0	1	10
4	FW	(Ghana)	23	Patrick Twumasi	8	0	0	0	1	0	9
5	FW	(Serbia)	9	Đorđe Despotović	5	0	0	1	0	0	6
5	MF	(Kazakhstan)	19	Baktiyar Zaynutdinov	5	0	0	0	0	1	6
7	FW	(Curaçao)	32	Rangelo Janga	4	0	0	0	0	0	4
7	MF	(Kazakhstan)	7	Serikzhan Muzhikov	3	0	0	1	0	0	4
9	DF	(Kazakhstan)	77	Dmitri Shomko	2	0	0	0	1	0	3
9	MF	(Brazil)	11	Pedro Henrique	0	0	0	0	0	3	3
11	MF	(Kazakhstan)	25	Serhiy Malyi	2	0	0	0	0	0	2
11	MF	(Hungary)	6	László Kleinheisler	0	0	0	2	0	0	2
13	MF	(Kazakhstan)	28	Yuriy Pertsukh	1	0	0	0	0	0	1
13	DF	(Kazakhstan)	27	Yuriy Logvinenko	1	0	0	0	0	0	1
13	MF	(Azerbaijan)	20	Richard Almeida	1	0	0	0	0	0	1
13	FW	(Kazakhstan)	81	Ramazan Karimov	1	0	0	0	0	0	1
13	FW	(Kazakhstan)	80	Vladislav Prokopenko	0	1	0	0	0	0	1
13	MF	(Belarus)	18	Ivan Mayewski	0	0	1	0	0	0	1
13	DF	(Bosnia and Herzegovina)	5	Marin Aničić	0	0	0	0	0	1	1
13	DF	(Kazakhstan)	44	Yevgeny Postnikov	0	0	0	0	0	1	1
13				Own goal	1	0	0	0	0	0	1
				TOTALS	66	1	3	5	4	8	84

=== Clean sheets ===
Place	Position	Nation	Number	Name	Premier League	Kazakhstan Cup	Super Cup	Champions League	2017–18 Europa League	2018–19 Europa League	Total
1	GK	(Kazakhstan)	1	Nenad Erić	11	0	1	3	0	2	17
2	GK	(Kazakhstan)	35	Aleksandr Mokin	7	0	0	0	0	0	7
				TOTALS	18	0	1	3	0	2	24

=== Disciplinary record ===
Number	Nation	Position	Name	Premier League		Kazakhstan Cup		Super Cup		Champions League		2017–18 Europa League		2018–19 Europa League		Total	
Number	Nation	Position	Name	Yellow card	Red card	Yellow card	Red card	Yellow card	Red card	Yellow card	Red card	Yellow card	Red card	Yellow card	Red card	Yellow card	Red card
1	(Kazakhstan)	GK	Nenad Erić	0	0	0	0	0	0	0	0	0	0	1	0	1	0
2	(Serbia)	DF	Antonio Rukavina	1	0	0	0	0	0	0	0	0	0	1	0	2	0
5	(Bosnia and Herzegovina)	DF	Marin Aničić	2	0	0	0	0	0	2	0	0	0	2	0	6	0
6	(Hungary)	MF	László Kleinheisler	6	0	0	0	0	0	0	0	1	0	3	0	10	0
7	(Kazakhstan)	MF	Serikzhan Muzhikov	6	0	0	0	1	0	1	0	1	0	3	0	12	0
11	(Brazil)	MF	Pedro Henrique	1	0	0	0	0	0	0	0	0	0	5	0	6	0
14	(Croatia)	MF	Marin Tomasov	2	0	0	0	0	0	0	0	0	0	0	0	2	0
15	(Kazakhstan)	DF	Abzal Beisebekov	4	0	0	0	0	0	0	0	1	0	1	0	6	0
18	(Belarus)	MF	Ivan Mayewski	6	0	0	0	0	0	2	0	1	0	0	0	9	0
19	(Kazakhstan)	MF	Baktiyar Zaynutdinov	4	0	0	0	0	0	0	0	0	0	1	0	5	0
20	(Azerbaijan)	MF	Richard Almeida	0	0	0	0	0	0	1	0	0	0	2	0	3	0
25	(Kazakhstan)	DF	Serhiy Malyi	4	0	0	0	0	0	1	0	0	0	0	0	5	0
27	(Kazakhstan)	DF	Yuriy Logvinenko	1	0	0	0	0	0	0	0	2	1	0	0	3	1
44	(Kazakhstan)	DF	Yevgeny Postnikov	3	0	0	0	0	0	2	0	0	0	1	0	6	0
45	(Kazakhstan)	FW	Roman Murtazayev	2	0	0	0	0	0	0	0	0	0	0	0	2	0
70	(Kazakhstan)	MF	Sultan Sagnayev	3	0	0	0	0	0	0	0	0	0	0	0	3	0
74	(Kazakhstan)	DF	Sagi Sovet	0	0	1	0	0	0	0	0	0	0	0	0	1	0
77	(Kazakhstan)	DF	Dmitri Shomko	3	0	0	0	0	0	0	0	0	0	1	0	4	0
80	(Kazakhstan)	FW	Vladislav Prokopenko	1	0	0	0	0	0	0	0	0	0	0	0	1	0
Players who left Astana during the season:
9	(Serbia)	FW	Đorđe Despotović	3	0	0	0	0	0	0	0	0	0	0	0	3	0
23	(Ghana)	FW	Patrick Twumasi	1	0	0	0	0	0	0	0	0	0	0	0	1	0
88	(Serbia)	MF	Marko Stanojević	1	0	0	0	0	0	0	0	0	0	0	0	1	0
			TOTALS	54	0	1	0	1	0	9	0	6	1	21	0	92	1
