= 2019 FC Astana season =

FC Astana
2019 season
- Chairman: Sayan Khamitzhanov
- Manager: Roman Hryhorchuk
- Stadium: Astana Arena
- Premier League: 1st
- Kazakhstan Cup: Last 16 vs Altai Semey
- Champions League: First qualifying round vs CFR Cluj
- Europa League: Group Stage
- Super Cup: Champions
- Top goalscorer: League: Marin Tomasov (19); All: Marin Tomasov (26)
Home colours	Away colours

The 2019 FC Astana season was the eleventh successive season that Astana played in the Kazakhstan Premier League, the highest tier of association football in Kazakhstan. Astana defended their Kazakhstan Premier League title, having won their fifth title the previous season. Domestically, Astana defeated FC Kairat in the season-opening Super Cup and reached the Last 16 of the Kazakhstan Cup. In Europe, Astana entered the Champions League at the first qualifying round and were defeated by CFR Cluj, dropping into the Europa League where they reached the Group Stage.

== Season events ==
When announcing their pre-season training camp dates, Astana also announced that Roman Hryhorchuk would return to lead the team after missing the second half of the 2018 season due to family reasons. On 28 January, Pedro Henrique's loan ended early and he returned to PAOK.

On 22 February, Astana announced the signing of Luka Šimunović on a three-year contract from Shakhtyor Soligorsk.

On 26 February, Astana announced the signing of Dorin Rotariu on a four-year contract from Club Brugge.

On 17 June, Astana announced the signing of Rúnar Már Sigurjónsson on a free transfer after his contract with Grasshoppers had expired.

On 2 July, Astana announced the signing of Ndombe Mubele on a one-year loan deal from Toulouse.

On 1 August, after their 4-1 victory over Santa Coloma in the UEFA Europa League Second round qualifier, Astana announced that Marin Aničić had moved to Konyaspor for an undisclosed fee.

On 3 August, Astana announced the signing of Žarko Tomašević on a free transfer.

On 26 August, Astana announced that Antonio Rukavina had extended his contract with the club until 2021, and that Marin Tomasov had extended his contract until 2022.

On 20 December, Ivan Mayewski signed a new 1+1-year contract with Astana, whilst the club confirmed that Yevgeny Postnikov had also extended his contract.

== Squad ==
As of match played 12 December 2019

No.	Name	Nationality	Position	Date of birth (age)	Signed from	Signed in	Contract ends	Apps.	Goals
Goalkeepers
1	Nenad Erić	(Kazakhstan)	GK	26 May 1982 (aged 37)	Kairat	2011		301	0
35	Aleksandr Mokin	(Kazakhstan)	GK	19 June 1981 (aged 38)	Irtysh Pavlodar	2019		57	0
53	Stanislav Pavlov	(Kazakhstan)	GK	30 May 1994 (aged 25)	Tobol	2018		2	0
Defenders
2	Antonio Rukavina	(Serbia)	DF	26 January 1984 (aged 35)	Villarreal	2018	2021	60	0
6	Žarko Tomašević	(Montenegro)	DF	22 February 1990 (aged 29)	Oostende	2019		6	0
15	Abzal Beisebekov	(Kazakhstan)	DF	30 November 1992 (aged 27)	Vostok	2012		283	7
24	Luka Šimunović	(Croatia)	DF	24 May 1997 (aged 22)	Shakhtyor Soligorsk	2019	2021	29	0
27	Yuriy Logvinenko	(Kazakhstan)	DF	22 July 1988 (aged 31)	Aktobe	2016		127	14
42	Lev Skvortsov	(Kazakhstan)	DF	2 February 2000 (aged 19)	Academy	2018		3	0
44	Yevgeny Postnikov	(Kazakhstan)	DF	16 April 1986 (aged 33)	Shakhtyor Soligorsk	2014		208	5
77	Dmitri Shomko	(Kazakhstan)	DF	19 March 1990 (aged 29)	Irtysh Pavlodar	2014		257	12
	Ravil Ibragimov	(Kazakhstan)	DF	25 December 2000 (aged 18)	Academy	2019		1	0
	Sagi Sovet	(Kazakhstan)	DF	15 March 2000 (aged 19)	Academy	2016		1	0
Midfielders
7	Serikzhan Muzhikov	(Kazakhstan)	MF	7 August 1989 (aged 30)	Kaisar	2015		189	19
10	Rúnar Már Sigurjónsson	(Iceland)	MF	18 June 1990 (aged 29)	Grasshoppers	2019		23	7
14	Marin Tomasov	(Croatia)	MF	31 August 1987 (aged 32)	Rijeka	2018	2022	108	48
18	Ivan Mayewski	(Belarus)	MF	5 May 1988 (aged 31)	Anzhi Makhachkala	2017	2020 (+1)	126	7
28	Yuriy Pertsukh	(Kazakhstan)	MF	13 May 1996 (aged 23)	Akzhayik	2018		44	3
71	Madi Zhakypbayev	(Kazakhstan)	MF	21 March 2000 (aged 19)	Academy	2016		7	0
73	Didar Zhalmukan	(Kazakhstan)	MF	22 May 1996 (aged 23)	Aktobe	2017		28	5
87	Zhaslan Kairkenov	(Kazakhstan)	MF	27 March 2000 (aged 19)	Academy	2016		2	0
Forwards
9	Dorin Rotariu	(Romania)	FW	29 July 1995 (aged 24)	Club Brugge	2019	2022	47	8
19	Ndombe Mubele	(Democratic Republic of the Congo)	FW	17 April 1994 (aged 25)	loan from Toulouse	2019	2020	12	1
32	Rangelo Janga	(Curaçao)	FW	16 April 1992 (aged 27)	KAA Gent	2018		64	11
45	Roman Murtazayev	(Kazakhstan)	FW	10 September 1993 (aged 26)	Irtysh Pavlodar	2017		131	26
72	Stanislav Basmanov	(Kazakhstan)	FW	24 June 2001 (aged 18)	Academy	2018		1	0
80	Vladislav Prokopenko	(Kazakhstan)	FW	1 July 2000 (aged 19)	Academy	2016		13	1
81	Ramazan Karimov	(Kazakhstan)	FW	5 July 1999 (aged 20)	Academy	2018		3	1
91	Sergei Khizhnichenko	(Kazakhstan)	FW	17 July 1991 (aged 28)	Ordabasy	2019		30	6
Players away on loan
20	Richard Almeida	(Azerbaijan)	MF	20 March 1989 (aged 30)	Qarabağ	2018		19	1
25	Serhiy Malyi	(Kazakhstan)	DF	5 June 1990 (aged 29)	Irtysh Pavlodar	2016		43	3
31	Danil Podymksy	(Kazakhstan)	GK	13 May 1998 (aged 21)	Academy	2016		0	0
55	Talgat Kusyapov	(Kazakhstan)	DF	14 February 1999 (aged 20)	Academy	2016		2	0
70	Sultan Sagnayev	(Kazakhstan)	MF	14 January 2000 (aged 19)	Academy	2016		9	0
99	Aleksey Shchotkin	(Kazakhstan)	FW	21 May 1991 (aged 28)	Taraz	2015		83	14
	Dmytro Nepohodov	(Kazakhstan)	GK	17 February 1988 (aged 31)	Tobol	2019		0	0
	Marat Bystrov	(Kazakhstan)	DF	19 June 1992 (aged 27)	Tambov	2018		0	0
Left during the season
5	Marin Aničić	(Bosnia and Herzegovina)	DF	17 August 1989 (aged 30)	Zrinjski Mostar	2014		212	11
11	Pedro Henrique	(Brazil)	MF	16 June 1990 (aged 29)	loan from PAOK	2018	2019	19	3
30	Junior Kabananga	(Democratic Republic of the Congo)	FW	4 April 1989 (aged 30)	loan from Al-Nassr	2018	2019	128	42

=== On loan ===
Note: Flags indicate national team as defined under FIFA eligibility rules; some limited exceptions apply. Players may hold more than one non-FIFA nationality.

No.	Pos.	Nation	Player
20	MF	AZE	Richard Almeida (at Qarabağ)
25	DF	KAZ	Serhiy Malyi (at Ordabasy)
31	GK	KAZ	Danil Podymksy (at Caspiy)
55	DF	KAZ	Talgat Kusyapov (at Caspiy)

No.	Pos.	Nation	Player
99	FW	KAZ	Aleksey Shchotkin (at Ordabasy)
—	GK	KAZ	Dmytro Nepohodov (at Ordabasy)
—	DF	RUS	Marat Bystrov (at Ordabasy)

== Transfers ==
=== In ===
Date	Position	Nationality	Name	From	Fee	Ref.
22 February 2019	DF	(Croatia)	Luka Šimunović	Shakhtyor Soligorsk	Undisclosed	
26 February 2019	FW	(Romania)	Dorin Rotariu	Club Brugge	Undisclosed	
Winter 2019	FW	(Kazakhstan)	Sergei Khizhnichenko	Ordabasy	Undisclosed	
17 June 2019	MF	(Iceland)	Rúnar Már Sigurjónsson	Grasshoppers	Free	
3 August 2019	DF	(Montenegro)	Žarko Tomašević	Oostende	Free	

=== Out ===
Date	Position	Nationality	Name	To	Fee	Ref.
12 January 2019	MF	(Kazakhstan)	Baktiyar Zaynutdinov	Rostov	Undisclosed	
16 January 2019	MF	(Hungary)	László Kleinheisler	NK Osijek	Undisclosed	
1 August 2019	DF	(Bosnia and Herzegovina)	Marin Aničić	Konyaspor	Undisclosed	

=== Loans in ===
Date from	Position	Nationality	Name	From	Date to	Ref.
12 July 2018	FW	(Democratic Republic of the Congo)	Junior Kabananga	Al-Nassr	1 July 2019	
14 July 2018	MF	(Brazil)	Pedro Henrique	PAOK	28 January 2019	
2 July 2019	FW	(Democratic Republic of the Congo)	Ndombe Mubele	Toulouse	1 July 2020	

=== Loans out ===
Date from	Position	Nationality	Name	To	Date to	Ref.
Winter 2019	DF	(Kazakhstan)	Talgat Kusyapov	Caspiy	End of Season	
12 January 2019	MF	(Azerbaijan)	Richard Almeida	Qarabağ	End of Season	
14 January 2019	GK	(Kazakhstan)	Dmytro Nepohodov	Ordabasy	End of Season	
14 January 2019	DF	(Russia)	Marat Bystrov	Ordabasy	End of Season	
14 January 2019	FW	(Kazakhstan)	Aleksey Shchotkin	Ordabasy	End of Season	
17 February 2019	DF	(Kazakhstan)	Serhiy Malyi	Ordabasy	End of Season	
3 July 2019	MF	(Kazakhstan)	Sultan Sagnayev	Irtysh Pavlodar	End of Season	
24 July 2019	GK	(Kazakhstan)	Danil Podymksy	Caspiy	End of Season	

=== Released ===
Date	Position	Nationality	Name	Joined	Date	Ref.
25 December 2019	FW	(Kazakhstan)	Roman Murtazayev	Tobol	7 January 2020	
31 December 2019	MF	(Azerbaijan)	Richard	Baniyas	21 January 2020	
31 December 2019	MF	(Kazakhstan)	Ravil Ibragimov	Kairat		

== Friendlies ==
24 January 2019	Astana (Kazakhstan)	3 – 2	(United Arab Emirates) Al-Wasl	United Arab Emirates
(UTC+6)	Murtazayev; Tomasov	Report	Goal

27 January 2019	Astana (Kazakhstan)	0 – 4	(Denmark) Copenhagen	United Arab Emirates
(UTC+6)		Report	Goal

30 January 2019	Astana (Kazakhstan)	2 – 4	(Denmark) Midtjylland	United Arab Emirates
(UTC+6)	Tomasov	Report	Goal

6 February 2019	Astana (Kazakhstan)	1 – 1	(Uzbekistan) Lokomotiv Tashkent	Antalya, Turkey
(UTC+6)	Pertsukh	Report	Goal

7 February 2019	Astana (Kazakhstan)	2 – 3	(Serbia) Mladost Lučani	Antalya, Turkey
(UTC+6)	Zhakypbayev; Kabananga	Report	Goal

11 February 2019	Astana (Kazakhstan)	2 – 0	(Bosnia and Herzegovina) Sarajevo	Antalya, Turkey
(UTC+6)	Logvinenko	Report

12 February 2019	Astana (Kazakhstan)	0 – 0	(Uzbekistan) Sogdiana Jizzakh	Antalya, Turkey
(UTC+6)		Report

17 February 2019	Astana (Kazakhstan)	4 – 2	(Armenia) Banants	Antalya, Turkey
(UTC+6)	Murtazayev; Kabananga; Tomasov; Pertsukh	Report	Goal

21 February 2019	Astana (Kazakhstan)	2 – 2	(Belarus) Dynamo Brest	Antalya, Turkey
(UTC+6)	Skvortsov; Muzhikov	Report

24 February 2019	Astana (Kazakhstan)	0 – 0	(Russia) Krylia Sovetov	Antalya, Turkey
(UTC+6)		Report

== Competitions ==
=== Super Cup ===
3 March 2019	Astana	2 – 0	Kairat	Almaty
15:00 (UTC+6)	Kabananga 7', 65'; Beisebekov (yellow card) 45'; Postnikov (yellow card) 56'	Report	Mikanović (yellow card) 57'; Kuat (yellow card) 61'; Eseola (red card) 84'	Stadium: Central Stadium; Attendance: 16,000; Referee: Igor Chesnokov

=== Premier League ===
==== Results summary ====
Overall								Home						Away					
Pld	W	D	L	GF	GA	GD	Pts	W	D	L	GF	GA	GD	W	D	L	GF	GA	GD
33	22	3	8	67	27	+40	69	13	0	4	41	15	+26	9	3	4	26	12	+14

Last updated: 10 November 2019.
Source: See Results

==== Results by round ====
Round	1	2	3	4	5	6	7	8	9	10	11	12	13	14	15	16	17	18	19	20	21	22	23	24	25	26	27	28	29	30	31	32	33
Ground	H	H	A	H	A	H	A	H	A	H	A	A	H	A	H	H	A	H	A	H	A	A	H	H	A	A	H	A	H	A	A	A	H
Result	W	W	W	W	D	W	W	W	W	L	L	W	L	D	W	W	L	L	W	W	L	W	W	W	L	W	W	D	W	W	W	W	L
Position	2	3	2	2	1	1	1	1	1	1	1	1	1	1	1	2	1	2	2	1	2	2	2	3	4	3	3	3	2	2	1	1	1

Source: See Results
A = Away; H = Home; W = Win; D = Draw; L = Loss

==== Results ====
11 March 2019 1	Astana	4 – 1	Aktobe	Astana
19:00 (UTC+6)	Tomasov 20', 39'; Logvinenko 34' (yellow card) 90+3'; Pertsukh 90+4'	Report	Aimbetov 3' (yellow card) 55'; S.Zhumagali (yellow card) 18'; A.Shurigin (yellow card) 66'	Stadium: Astana Arena; Attendance: 10,000; Referee: Artyom Kuchin

15 March 2019 2	Astana	2 – 1	Okzhetpes	Astana
19:30 (UTC+6)	Janga 59'; Mayewski 72'	Report	D.Babakhanov (yellow card) 54'; Dmitrijev 69'; Stojanović (yellow card) 82'	Stadium: Astana Arena; Attendance: 2,700; Referee: Igor Aleshin
Note: On 19 March 2019, Astana was renamed Nur-Sultan.

30 March 2019 3	Zhetysu	0 – 2	Astana	Taldıqorğan
17:00 (UTC+6)		Report	Aničić 26'; Rotariu 58'; Pertsukh (yellow card) 90+2'	Stadium: Zhetysu Stadium; Attendance: 1,500; Referee: Saken Bayimbet

3 April 2019 18	Astana	3 – 1	Atyrau	Nur-Sultan
19:00 (UTC+6)	Kabananga 17'; Rotariu 40'; Beisebekov 49'; Aničić (yellow card) 82'	Report	K.Kalmuratov (yellow card) 47'; D.Kayralliyev (yellow card) 54'; Tkachuk (yellow card) 81'; R.Dzhumatov 85'	Stadium: Astana Arena; Attendance: 2,100; Referee: Aydin Rakhimbayev

7 April 2019 4	Kaisar	0 – 0	Astana	Kyzylorda
17:00 (UTC+6)	Mbombo (yellow card) 32'; Barseghyan (yellow card) 36'; Gorman (yellow card) 49'; Narzildaev (yellow card) 66'	Report	Shomko (yellow card) 36'; Tomasov (yellow card) 50'	Stadium: Gani Muratbayev Stadium; Attendance: 3,000; Referee: Aleksandr Gauzer

14 April 2019 5	Astana	2 – 1	Ordabasy	Nur-Sultan
19:00 (UTC+6)	Rotariu 15'; Muzhikov (yellow card) 42'; Tomasov 65' (pen.)	Report	Zhangylyshbay 44'; Erlanov (yellow card) 64'; U.Zhaksybaev (yellow card) 85'; João Paulo (yellow card) 90+3'	Stadium: Astana Arena; Attendance: 3,200; Referee: Denis Izmailov

20 April 2019 6	Kairat	0 – 1	Astana	Almaty
17:00 (UTC+6)	Suyumbayev (yellow card) 61'; Kosović (yellow card) 87'	Report	Rotariu 21' (yellow card) 41'; Beisebekov (yellow card) 60'	Stadium: Central Stadium; Attendance: 10,500; Referee: Anatolyi Vishnichenko

27 April 2019 7	Astana	2 – 1	Tobol	Nur-Sultan
19:00 (UTC+6)	Muzhikov (yellow card) 37'; Aničić 59'; Mayewski (yellow card) 73'; Murtazayev 90+2'	Report	Bocharov 8'; Kvekveskiri (yellow card) 33'; Kassaï (yellow card) 51'; Balayev (yellow card) 90'; Kleshchenko (yellow card) 90+3'	Stadium: Astana Arena; Attendance: 3,000; Referee: Sergey Gorokhovodatskiy

1 May 2019 8	Atyrau	0 – 3	Astana	Atyrau
17:30 (UTC+6)	K.Kalmuratov (yellow card) 16'	Report	Tomasov 7' (yellow card) 14'; Muzhikov 59'; Khizhnichenko 90+2'	Stadium: Munaishy Stadium; Attendance: 500; Referee: Rustam Omarov

5 May 2019 9	Astana	0 – 1	Irtysh Pavlodar	Nur-Sultan
19:00 (UTC+6)	Pertsukh (yellow card) 50'; Postnikov (yellow card) 61'; Muzhikov (yellow card) 73'	Report	S.Tursynbay (yellow card) 57'; Cañas 78'	Stadium: Astana Arena; Attendance: 1,300; Referee: Artyom Kuchin

11 May 2019 10	Taraz	2 – 0	Astana	Taraz
16:00 (UTC+6)	D.Karaman (yellow card) 30'; Nyuiadzi 48' (pen.); A.Taubay (yellow card) 56'; Gian (yellow card) 72'; Lobjanidze 76'; M.Amirkhanov (yellow card) 89'	Report	Logvinenko (yellow card) 20'; Postnikov (yellow card) 80'	Stadium: Central Stadium; Attendance: 6,000; Referee: Bulat Saryev

15 May 2019 19	Irtysh Pavlodar	0 – 4	Astana	Pavlodar
18:30 (UTC+6)	Tsirin (yellow card) 90+2'	Report	Kabananga 40'; Tomasov 63', 85'; Janga 90'	Stadium: Central Stadium; Attendance: 2,000; Referee: Anatolyi Vishnichenko

19 May 2019 11	Astana	1 – 2	Shakhter Karagandy	Nur-Sultan
19:00 (UTC+6)	Murtazayev 35'; Tomasov (yellow card) 77'	Report	Shakhmetov (yellow card) 59' (goal) 78' (pen.); Zenjov 87'; Najaryan (yellow card) 90+3'	Stadium: Astana Arena; Attendance: 2,000; Referee: Aleksandr Gauzer

26 May 2019 12	Okzhetpes	1 – 1	Astana	Kokshetau
17:00 (UTC+6)	S.Zhumakhanov (yellow card) 49'; Alves (yellow card) 53'; Stojanović 90+1'	Report	Logvinenko (yellow card) 32'; Mayewski (yellow card) 32'; Murtazayev 45' (yellow card) 60'; Postnikov (yellow card) 54'; Muzhikov (yellow card) 90+4' (yellow-red card) 90+4'	Stadium: Okzhetpes Stadium; Attendance: 2,700; Referee: Ruslan Omarov

31 May 2019 13	Astana	1 – 0	Zhetysu	Nur-Sultan
19:00 (UTC+6)	Postnikov 36' (yellow card) 80'; Rukavina (yellow card) 90'	Report	Adamović (yellow card) 51'; O.Kerimzhanov (yellow card) 74' (yellow-red card) 79'	Stadium: Astana Arena; Attendance: 1,500; Referee: Aydin Rakhimbayev

16 June 2019 14	Astana	4 – 1	Kaisar	Nur-Sultan
19:00 (UTC+6)	Murtazayev 14'; Pertsukh 26'; Rotariu 46'; Tomasov 50'; Muzhikov (yellow card) 60'	Report	Narzildaev (yellow card) 45'; Graf (yellow card) 54'; Barseghyan 79'; Gorman (yellow card) 89'	Stadium: Astana Arena; Attendance: 2,500; Referee: Anatolyi Vishnichenko

23 June 2019 15	Ordabasy	3 – 2	Astana	Shymkent
19:00 (UTC+6)	M.Tolebek 28'; Mehanović 36' (yellow card) 56'; Malyi (yellow card) 44' (yellow-red card) 73'; Zhangylyshbay 47'	Report	Tomasov 44'; Murtazayev 74' (yellow card) 78'	Stadium: Kazhymukan Munaitpasov Stadium; Attendance: 5,500; Referee: Bolat Karlibayev

30 June 2019 16	Astana	0 – 2	Kairat	Pavlodar
20:00 (UTC+6)	Mayewski (yellow card) 50'	Report	Akhmetov (yellow card) 32'; Dugalić 68'; Abiken 70'; Kuat (yellow card) 90+2'	Stadium: Central Stadium; Attendance: 3,800; Referee: Igor Chesnokov
Note: Match was played at the Central Stadium in Pavlodar instead of Astana's normal home ground of the Astana Arena in Nur-Sultan.

5 July 2019 17	Tobol	0 – 2	Astana	Kostanay
19:00 (UTC+6)	Turysbek (yellow card) 35'; Žulpa (yellow card) 74'	Report	Mayewski (yellow card) 43'; Sigurjónsson 53'; Tomasov 76'; Janga (yellow card) 90'	Stadium: Central Stadium; Attendance: 5,500; Referee: Askhat Abdanbayev

28 July 2019 20	Astana	4 – 0	Taraz	Nur-Sultan
19:00 (UTC+6)	Janga (yellow card) 16' (goal) 33', 71'; Aničić (yellow card) 44'; Mubele 63'; Tomasov 88'	Report	Kasradze (yellow card) 42'	Stadium: Astana Arena; Attendance: 3,500; Referee: Zhandos Abzhan

4 August 2019 21	Shakhter Karagandy	1 – 0	Astana	Karaganda
19:30 (UTC+6)	Pešić 39'; J.Payruz (yellow card) 41'; Najaryan (yellow card) 83'; Shatskiy (yellow card) 90+4'	Report	Muzhikov (yellow card) 63'; Mayewski (yellow card) 68'	Stadium: Shakhter Stadium; Attendance: 7,000; Referee: Ruslan Omarov

11 August 2019 22	Aktobe	2 – 3	Astana	Aktobe
20:00 (UTC+6)	Aimbetov 56', 84' (yellow card) 84'; A.Tanzharikov (yellow card) 63'	Report	Mayewski 8'; Sigurjónsson 53'; Murtazayev 86'	Stadium: Central Stadium; Attendance: 11,500; Referee: Artyom Kuchin

25 August 2019 24	Astana	5 – 0	Taraz	Nur-Sultan
19:00 (UTC+6)	Janga 18'; D.Zhalmukan 57', 83'; Murtazayev 59'; Tomašević (red card) 67'; Tomasov 76'	Report	Nyuiadzi (red card) 67'; R.Rozybakiev (yellow card) 71'	Stadium: Astana Arena; Attendance: 1,500; Referee: Aleksandr Gauzer

15 September 2019 26	Astana	2 – 1	Shakhter Karagandy	Nur-Sultan
19:00 (UTC+6)	Tomasov 54'; Vidović 66' (o.g.); Shomko (yellow card) 67'	Report	Shkodra 34'; Kizito (yellow card) 80'; Reginaldo (yellow card) 90'	Stadium: Astana Arena; Attendance: 3,500; Referee: Bakhyt Kyzylbaev

22 September 2019 27	Zhetysu	2 – 1	Astana	Taldıqorğan
16:00 (UTC+6)	Toshev 80'; Zhaksylykov 89'	Report	Rotariu 8'; Sigurjónsson (yellow card) 43'; Postnikov (yellow card) 68'	Stadium: Zhetysu Stadium; Attendance: 3,500; Referee: Grigory Moskovchenko

25 September 2019 23	Atyrau	1 – 4	Astana	Atyrau
16:00 (UTC+6)	K.Kalmuratov (yellow card) 73' (goal) 89'	Report	Marković 13' (o.g.); Tomasov 15', 33'; Rotariu 45+2'	Stadium: Munaishy Stadium; Attendance: 2,000; Referee: Denis Izmailov
Note: Match originally scheduled for 17 August 2019 but postponed due to Astana's involvement in UEFA Europa League qualifiers.

29 September 2019 28	Astana	3 – 0	Kaisar	Nur-Sultan
19:00 (UTC+6)	Beisebekov 14'; Khizhnichenko 24', 58'; Mayewski (yellow card) 27'	Report	Graf (yellow card) 61'; Sadownichy (yellow card) 71'; V.Chureyev (yellow card) 82'; Gorman (yellow card) 90+2'	Stadium: Astana Arena; Attendance: 2,500; Referee: Igor Chesnokov

6 October 2019 29	Ordabasy	1 – 1	Astana	Shymkent
18:00 (UTC+6)	João Paulo 51'	Report	Yerlanov 15' (o.g.); Mayewski (yellow card) 54'; Erić (yellow card) 64'; Beisebekov (yellow card) 79'	Stadium: Kazhymukan Munaitpasov Stadium; Attendance: 6,500; Referee: Bagdat Abdullaev

20 October 2019 30	Astana	3 – 1	Kairat	Nur-Sultan
20:00 (UTC+6)	Tomasov 9'; Erić (yellow card) 55'; Rotariu (yellow card) 55'; Khizhnichenko 61'; Janga 90+5' (yellow card) 90+5'	Report	Eseola (yellow card) 39'; Islamkhan (yellow card) 55'; Plotnikov (yellow card) 55'; Dugalić 68'	Stadium: Astana Arena; Attendance: 16,200; Referee: Artyom Kuchin

27 October 2019 31	Astana	5 – 0	Aktobe	Nur-Sultan
20:00 (UTC+6)	Pertsukh (yellow card) 19'; Tomasov 22', 45', 49', 55'; Muzhikov 90'	Report		Stadium: Astana Arena; Attendance: 2,400; Referee: Daniyar Sakhi

30 October 2019 25	Okzhetpes	0 – 1	Astana	Kokshetau
15:00 (UTC+6)	A.Saparov (yellow card) 27'; Alves (yellow card) 73'; T.Zhakupov (yellow card) 90+3'	Report	Logvinenko 33'	Stadium: Okzhetpes Stadium; Attendance: 2,500; Referee: Bakhyt Kyzylbaev
Note: Match originally scheduled for 1 September 2019 but postponed due to Astana's involvement in UEFA Europa League qualifiers.

3 November 2019 32	Tobol	0 – 1	Astana	Kostanay
15:00 (UTC+6)	Nurgaliev (yellow card) 35'; Sebai (yellow card) 56'	Report	Logvinenko 37'	Stadium: Tobol Indoor Arena; Attendance: 2,700; Referee: Askhat Abdanbayev

10 November 2019 33	Astana	0 – 2	Irtysh Pavlodar	Nur-Sultan
15:00 (UTC+6)	Pertsukh (yellow card) 56'; Postnikov (yellow card) 75'	Report	Manzorro 43'; Hidi (yellow card) 59'; Mingazow 68'	Stadium: Astana Arena; Attendance: 2,000; Referee: Denis Izmailov

==== League table ====
Pos	Team	Pld	W	D	L	GF	GA	GD	Pts	Qualification or relegation
1	Astana (C)	33	22	3	8	67	28	+39	69	Qualification for the Champions League first qualifying round
2	Kairat	33	22	2	9	65	32	+33	68	Qualification for the Europa League first qualifying round
3	Ordabasy	33	19	8	6	52	24	+28	65	Qualification for the Europa League first qualifying round
4	Tobol	33	19	6	8	45	27	+18	63	
5	Zhetysu	33	16	8	9	45	25	+20	56	

Source: UEFA, Soccerway
Rules for classification: 1) Points; 2) Goal difference; 3) Matches won; 4) Goals scored; 5) Away goals scored; 6) Head-to-head points; 7) Head-to-head matches won; 8) Head-to-head goal difference; 9) Head-to-head goals scored; 10) Head-to-head away goals scored; 11) Draw.
(C) Champions

=== Kazakhstan Cup ===
10 April 2019 Last 16	Altai Semey	1 – 1 (a.e.t.) (15 – 14 p)	Astana	Semey
15:00 (UTC+6)	A.Umashev 64'	Report	Muzhikov 25'; R.Ibragimov (yellow card) 76'; D.Zhalmukan (yellow card) 110'	Stadium: Spartak Stadium; Attendance: 4,500; Referee: Zhandos Abzhan
	Penalties
	A.Umashev (penalty scored); V.Vyatkin (penalty scored); N.Sovetkazy (penalty scored); Bilyi (penalty scored); Dudkin (penalty scored); M.Zhaksylyk (penalty scored); Podprugin (penalty scored); D.Kenzhegulov (penalty scored); T.Adulhanov (penalty scored); A.Shakin (penalty scored); A.Sapargaliev (penalty scored); A.Umashev (penalty scored); V.Vyatkin (penalty scored); N.Sovetkazy (penalty scored); Bilyi (penalty scored)		(penalty scored) Beisebekov; (penalty scored) Shomko; (penalty scored) D.Zhalmukan; (penalty scored) Karimov; (penalty scored) Muzhikov; (penalty scored) Šimunović; (penalty scored) S.Sagnayev; (penalty scored) Skvortsov; (penalty scored) Rotariu; (penalty scored) Kabananga; (penalty scored) Mokin; (penalty scored) Beisebekov; (penalty scored) Shomko; (penalty scored) D.Zhalmukan; (penalty missed) Karimov
Note: Match played at Vostok's Vostok Stadium in Oskemen, instead of Altai Semey's regular Spartak Stadium in Semey.

=== UEFA Champions League ===
==== Qualifying rounds ====
9 July 2019 First qualifying round 1st leg	Astana (Kazakhstan)	1 – 0	(Romania) CFR Cluj	Nur-Sultan, Kazakhstan
19:00 (UTC+6)	Postnikov 68' (yellow card) 90+5'	Report	Camora (yellow card) 85'	Stadium: Astana Arena; Attendance: 18,587; Referee: Lawrence Visser (Belgium)

18 July 2019 First qualifying round 2nd leg	CFR Cluj (Romania)	3 – 1 (3 – 2 agg.)	(Kazakhstan) Astana	Cluj-Napoca, Romania
00:00 (UTC+6)	Omrani 10', 31'; Postnikov 26' (o.g.)	Report	Murtazayev 4'	Stadium: Stadionul Dr. Constantin Rădulescu; Attendance: 8,092; Referee: Alexander Harkam (Austria)

=== UEFA Europa League ===
==== Qualifying rounds ====
24 July 2019 Second qualifying round 1st leg	Santa Coloma (Andorra)	0 – 0	(Kazakhstan) Astana	Andorra la Vella, Andorra
00:00 (UTC+6)	Nicolás (yellow card) 75'; Jesús Rubio (yellow card) 83'; Rebés (yellow card) 84'; Juanma Miranda (yellow card) 85'; Eloy (yellow card) 90+1'	Report	Mayewski (yellow card) 75'	Stadium: Estadi Comunal d'Andorra la Vella; Attendance: 382; Referee: Robert Hennessy (Republic of Ireland)

1 August 2019 Second qualifying round 2nd leg	Astana (Kazakhstan)	4 – 1 (4 – 1 agg.)	(Andorra) Santa Coloma	Nur-Sultan, Kazakhstan
20:00 (UTC+6)	Janga (yellow card) 38'; Sigurjónsson 24' (pen.); Tomasov 73', 79', 90+4' (yellow card) 75'; Aničić (yellow card) 90+1'	Report	Pi 7' (yellow card) 24'; Juanma Miranda (yellow card) 26'; Nájera (yellow card) 89'; Cisteró (yellow card) 90+2'	Stadium: Astana Arena; Attendance: 16,103; Referee: Giorgi Kruashvili (Georgia)

8 August 2019 Third qualifying round 1st leg	Astana (Kazakhstan)	5 – 1	(Malta) Valletta	Nur-Sultan, Kazakhstan
20:00 (UTC+6)	Sigurjónsson 8', 57'; Logvinenko 15' (yellow card) 82'; Tomasov 35'; Janga 80'	Report	Fontanella 67'	Stadium: Astana Arena; Attendance: 18,707; Referee: Vladislav Bezborodov (Russia)

16 August 2019 Third qualifying round 2nd leg	Valletta (Malta)	0 – 4 (1 – 9 agg.)	(Kazakhstan) Astana	Ta' Qali, Malta
00:00 (UTC+6)	Peña (yellow card) 45'; K.Tulimieri (yellow card) 56'; E.Sala (yellow card) 58'	Report	Murtazayev 25', 68'; Tomasov 37', 89'	Stadium: Centenary Stadium; Attendance: 595; Referee: Stephan Klossner (Switzerland)

22 August 2019 Playoff round 1st leg	Astana (Kazakhstan)	3 – 0	(Belarus) BATE Borisov	Nur-Sultan, Kazakhstan
20:00 (UTC+6)	Shomko (yellow card) 17'; Tomasov 23'; Rukavina (yellow card) 38'; Logvinenko 44'; Sigurjónsson 52' (pen.)	Report	Moukam (yellow card) 25'; Simović (yellow card) 81'	Stadium: Astana Arena; Attendance: 24,369; Referee: Serhiy Boyko (Ukraine)

29 August 2019 Playoff round 2nd leg	BATE Borisov (Belarus)	2 – 0 (2 – 3 agg.)	(Kazakhstan) Astana	Barysaw, Belarus
23:00 (UTC+6)	Skavysh 6'; Yablonskiy 85'; Chichkan (yellow card) 90+7'; Stasevich (yellow card) 90+7'; Willumsson (yellow card) 90+7'	Report	Tomasov (yellow card) 54'	Stadium: Borisov Arena; Attendance: 10,701; Referee: Bobby Madden (Scotland)

==== Group stage ====
Pos	Team	Pld	W	D	L	GF	GA	GD	Pts	Qualification
1	(England) Manchester United	6	4	1	1	10	2	+8	13	Advance to knockout phase
2	(Netherlands) AZ	6	2	3	1	15	8	+7	9	Advance to knockout phase
3	(Serbia) Partizan	6	2	2	2	10	10	0	8	
4	(Kazakhstan) Astana	6	1	0	5	4	19	−15	3	

Source: UEFA
Rules for classification: Group stage tiebreakers

20 September 2019 1	Manchester United (England)	1 – 0	(Kazakhstan) Astana	Manchester, England
00:00 (UTC+6)	Greenwood 73'; Fred (yellow card) 85'	Report		Stadium: Old Trafford; Attendance: 50,783; Referee: François Letexier (France)

3 October 2019 2	Astana (Kazakhstan)	1 – 2	(Serbia) Partizan	Nur-Sultan, Kazakhstan
20:50 (UTC+6)	Sigurjónsson 85'	Report	Sadiq 29', 73'	Stadium: Astana Arena; Attendance: 20,137; Referee: Mohammed Al-Hakim (Sweden)

24 October 2019 3	AZ (Netherlands)	6 – 0	(Kazakhstan) Astana	The Hague, Netherlands
22:55 (UTC+6)	Koopmeiners 39' (pen.), 83' (pen.); Boadu 43'; Stengs 77'; Sugawara 85'; Idrissi 90+2'	Report	Shomko (yellow card) 38'; Mayewski (yellow card) 41'; Postnikov (yellow card) 83'	Stadium: Cars Jeans Stadion; Attendance: 8,123; Referee: Enea Jorgji (Albania)
Note: AZ played their home matches at Cars Jeans Stadion, The Hague, instead of their regular home stadium AFAS Stadion, Alkmaar due to the latter's roof collapse.

7 November 2019 4	Astana (Kazakhstan)	0 – 5	(Netherlands) AZ	Nur-Sultan, Kazakhstan
21:50 (UTC+6)	Postnikov (yellow card) 75'; Pertsukh (yellow card) 79'	Report	Boadu 29', 77'; De Wit (yellow card) 33'; Midtsjø 52'; Idrissi 57'; Hatzidiakos 76'	Stadium: Astana Arena; Attendance: 11,584; Referee: Mads-Kristoffer Kristoffersen (Denmark)

28 November 2019 5	Astana (Kazakhstan)	2 – 1	(England) Manchester United	Nur-Sultan, Kazakhstan
21:50 (UTC+6)	Sigurjónsson (yellow card) 39'; Shomko 55' (yellow card) 83'; Bernard 62' (o.g.); Logvinenko (yellow card) 69'; Beisebekov (yellow card) 81'	Report	Lingard 10'; Levitt (yellow card) 59'; Ramazani (yellow card) 88'	Stadium: Astana Arena; Attendance: 28,949; Referee: Donatas Rumšas (Lithuania)

13 December 2019 6	Partizan (Serbia)	4 – 1	(Kazakhstan) Astana	Belgrade, Serbia
02:00 (UTC+6)	Soumah 4'; Sadiq 22', 76'; Asano 26'	Report	Rotariu 79'	Stadium: Partizan Stadium; Referee: Filip Glova (Slovakia)

== Squad statistics ==
As of match played 12 December 2019

=== Appearances and goals ===
No.	Pos	Nat	Player	Total		Premier League		Kazakhstan Cup		Super Cup		Champions League		Europa League	
No.	Pos	Nat	Player	Apps	Goals	Apps	Goals	Apps	Goals	Apps	Goals	Apps	Goals	Apps	Goals
1	GK	(Kazakhstan) KAZ	Nenad Erić	43	0	28	0	0	0	1	0	2	0	12	0
2	DF	(Serbia) SRB	Antonio Rukavina	43	0	28	0	0	0	1	0	2	0	11+1	0
6	DF	(Montenegro) MNE	Žarko Tomašević	6	0	2	0	0	0	0	0	0	0	2+2	0
7	MF	(Kazakhstan) KAZ	Serikzhan Muzhikov	23	3	10+8	2	1	1	0	0	0	0	2+2	0
9	FW	(Romania) ROU	Dorin Rotariu	47	8	28+3	7	0+1	0	1	0	2	0	12	1
10	MF	(Iceland) ISL	Rúnar Már Sigurjónsson	23	7	9+2	2	0	0	0	0	2	0	10	5
14	MF	(Croatia) CRO	Marin Tomasov	42	26	29+2	19	0	0	1	0	2	0	7+1	7
15	DF	(Kazakhstan) KAZ	Abzal Beisebekov	41	2	21+9	2	0+1	0	1	0	2	0	5+2	0
18	MF	(Belarus) BLR	Ivan Mayewski	41	2	26	2	0	0	1	0	2	0	12	0
19	FW	(Democratic Republic of the Congo) COD	Ndombe Mubele	12	1	2+3	1	0	0	0	0	0+2	0	3+2	0
24	DF	(Croatia) CRO	Luka Šimunović	29	0	16+2	0	1	0	0	0	2	0	8	0
27	DF	(Kazakhstan) KAZ	Yuriy Logvinenko	28	5	14+1	3	0	0	1	0	2	0	9+1	2
28	MF	(Kazakhstan) KAZ	Yuriy Pertsukh	37	2	20+9	2	0	0	0+1	0	0	0	3+4	0
32	FW	(Curaçao) CUW	Rangelo Janga	44	7	8+22	6	1	0	0+1	0	0+2	0	2+8	1
35	GK	(Kazakhstan) KAZ	Aleksandr Mokin	7	0	5	0	1	0	0	0	0	0	0+1	0
42	DF	(Kazakhstan) KAZ	Lev Skvortsov	1	0	0	0	1	0	0	0	0	0	0	0
44	DF	(Kazakhstan) KAZ	Yevgeny Postnikov	46	2	30+1	1	0	0	1	0	2	1	10+2	0
45	FW	(Kazakhstan) KAZ	Roman Murtazayev	47	10	26+6	7	1	0	1	0	2	1	6+5	2
73	MF	(Kazakhstan) KAZ	Didar Zhalmukan	9	2	2+5	2	1	0	0	0	0	0	1	0
77	DF	(Kazakhstan) KAZ	Dmitri Shomko	44	1	26+5	0	1	0	0+1	0	0	0	11	1
80	FW	(Kazakhstan) KAZ	Vladislav Prokopenko	2	0	0+1	0	1	0	0	0	0	0	0	0
81	FW	(Kazakhstan) KAZ	Ramazan Karimov	1	0	0	0	0+1	0	0	0	0	0	0	0
91	FW	(Kazakhstan) KAZ	Sergei Khizhnichenko	14	4	7+3	4	0	0	0	0	0	0	4	0
	DF	(Kazakhstan) KAZ	Ravil Ibragimov	1	0	0	0	1	0	0	0	0	0	0	0
Players away from Astana on loan:
70	MF	(Kazakhstan) KAZ	Sultan Sagnayev	1	0	0	0	1	0	0	0	0	0	0	0
Players who left Astana during the season:
5	DF	(Bosnia and Herzegovina) BIH	Marin Aničić	18	2	14	2	0	0	1	0	0+1	0	2	0
30	FW	(Democratic Republic of the Congo) COD	Junior Kabananga	16	4	12+2	2	0+1	0	1	2	0	0	0	0

=== Goal scorers ===
Place	Position	Nation	Number	Name	Premier League	Kazakhstan Cup	Super Cup	Champions League	Europa League	Total
1	MF	(Croatia)	14	Marin Tomasov	19	0	0	0	7	26
2	FW	(Kazakhstan)	45	Roman Murtazayev	7	0	0	1	2	10
3	FW	(Romania)	9	Dorin Rotariu	7	0	0	0	1	8
4	FW	(Curaçao)	32	Rangelo Janga	6	0	0	0	1	7
4	MF	(Iceland)	10	Rúnar Már Sigurjónsson	2	0	0	0	5	7
6	DF	(Kazakhstan)	27	Yuriy Logvinenko	3	0	0	0	2	5
7	FW	(Kazakhstan)	91	Sergei Khizhnichenko	4	0	0	0	0	4
7	FW	(Democratic Republic of the Congo)	30	Junior Kabananga	2	0	2	0	0	4
7				Own goal	3	0	0	0	1	4
10	MF	(Kazakhstan)	7	Serikzhan Muzhikov	2	1	0	0	0	3
11	DF	(Bosnia and Herzegovina)	5	Marin Aničić	2	0	0	0	0	2
11	MF	(Kazakhstan)	28	Yuriy Pertsukh	2	0	0	0	0	2
11	MF	(Belarus)	18	Ivan Mayewski	2	0	0	0	0	2
11	MF	(Kazakhstan)	73	Didar Zhalmukan	2	0	0	0	0	2
11	DF	(Kazakhstan)	15	Abzal Beisebekov	2	0	0	0	0	2
11	DF	(Kazakhstan)	44	Yevgeny Postnikov	1	0	0	1	0	2
17	FW	(Democratic Republic of the Congo)	19	Ndombe Mubele	1	0	0	0	0	1
17	DF	(Kazakhstan)	77	Dmitri Shomko	0	0	0	0	1	1
				TOTALS	64	1	2	2	20	89

=== Clean sheet ===
Place	Position	Nation	Number	Name	Premier League	Kazakhstan Cup	Super Cup	Champions League	Europa League	Total
1	GK	(Kazakhstan)	1	Nenad Erić	10	0	1	1	3	15
2	GK	(Kazakhstan)	35	Aleksandr Mokin	3	0	0	0	0	3
				TOTALS	13	0	1	1	3	18

=== Disciplinary record ===
Number	Nation	Position	Name	Premier League		Kazakhstan Cup		Super Cup		Champions League		Europa League		Total	
Number	Nation	Position	Name	Yellow card	Red card	Yellow card	Red card	Yellow card	Red card	Yellow card	Red card	Yellow card	Red card	Yellow card	Red card
1	(Kazakhstan)	GK	Nenad Erić	2	0	0	0	0	0	0	0	0	0	2	0
2	(Serbia)	DF	Antonio Rukavina	1	0	0	0	0	0	0	0	1	0	2	0
6	(Montenegro)	DF	Žarko Tomašević	0	1	0	0	0	0	0	0	0	0	0	1
7	(Kazakhstan)	MF	Serikzhan Muzhikov	7	1	0	0	0	0	0	0	0	0	7	1
9	(Romania)	FW	Dorin Rotariu	2	0	0	0	0	0	0	0	0	0	2	0
10	(Iceland)	MF	Rúnar Már Sigurjónsson	1	0	0	0	0	0	0	0	1	0	2	0
14	(Croatia)	MF	Marin Tomasov	3	0	0	0	0	0	0	0	2	0	5	0
15	(Kazakhstan)	DF	Abzal Beisebekov	2	0	0	0	1	0	0	0	1	0	4	0
18	(Belarus)	MF	Ivan Mayewski	7	0	0	0	0	0	0	0	2	0	9	0
27	(Kazakhstan)	DF	Yuriy Logvinenko	3	0	0	0	0	0	0	0	2	0	5	0
28	(Kazakhstan)	MF	Yuriy Pertsukh	4	0	0	0	0	0	0	0	2	0	6	0
32	(Curaçao)	FW	Rangelo Janga	3	0	0	0	0	0	0	0	1	0	4	0
44	(Kazakhstan)	DF	Yevgeny Postnikov	6	0	0	0	1	0	1	0	2	0	10	0
45	(Kazakhstan)	FW	Roman Murtazayev	2	0	0	0	0	0	0	0	0	0	2	0
73	(Kazakhstan)	MF	Didar Zhalmukan	0	0	1	0	0	0	0	0	0	0	1	0
77	(Kazakhstan)	DF	Dmitri Shomko	2	0	0	0	0	0	0	0	3	0	5	0
	(Kazakhstan)	DF	Ravil Ibragimov	0	0	1	0	0	0	0	0	0	0	1	0
Players who left Astana during the season:
5	(Bosnia and Herzegovina)	DF	Marin Aničić	2	0	0	0	0	0	0	0	1	0	3	0
			TOTALS	47	2	2	0	2	0	1	0	18	0	70	2
