= Jhoan Arenas =

Colombian footballer (born 1990)

Personal information
- Date of birth: January 16, 1990 (age 36)
- Place of birth: Chinácota, Colombia
- Height: 1.71 m (5 ft 7 in)
- Position: Midfielder

Team information
- Current team: Cúcuta Deportivo
- Number: 11

Youth career
- –2007: Independiente Medellín

Senior career*
Years	Team	Apps	(Gls)
2007	Independiente Medellín		
2008	Cúcuta Deportivo		
2008–2013	CD San Antonio		
2013	Deportivo La Guaira		
2014–2016	Zamora	56	(8)
2016	→ Estudiantes de Mérida (loan)	26	(4)
2017	Akzhayik	25	(1)
2018	Academia Puerto Cabello	26	(3)
2019	Atlético Venezuela	23	(1)
2020–	Cúcuta Deportivo	3	(0)
- * Club domestic league appearances and goals as of 24 April 2020

Jhoan Manuel Arenas Delgado is a Colombian footballer who currently plays for Cúcuta Deportivo, after having played extensively in Colombia and Venezuela.

== Career statistics ==
=== Club ===
As of match played 28 October 2017

Appearances and goals by club, season and competition
Club	Season	League			National Cup		Continental		Other		Total	
Club	Season	Division	Apps	Goals	Apps	Goals	Apps	Goals	Apps	Goals	Apps	Goals
Akzhayik	2017	Kazakhstan Premier League	25	1	1	0	–		–		26	1
Career total			25	1	1	0	-	-	-	-	26	1
