= Yury Pertsukh =

Kazakhstani footballer

Personal information
- Full name: Yury Vladimirovich Pertsukh
- Date of birth: 13 May 1996 (age 30)
- Place of birth: Almaty, Kazakhstan
- Height: 1.86 m (6 ft 1 in)
- Position: Midfielder

Team information
- Current team: Kyzylzhar
- Number: 88

Senior career*
Years	Team	Apps	(Gls)
2014–2016	CSKA Almaty	19	(3)
2014	→ Bayterek (loan)	23	(2)
2016	Kyzylzhar	23	(1)
2017	Akzhayik	24	(2)
2018–2023	Astana	53	(4)
2018	→ Atyrau (loan)	10	(1)
2021	→ Aktobe (loan)	18	(1)
2023	Shakhter Karagandy	25	(2)
2024–2025	Yelimay	14	(2)
2025	Shakhter Karagandy	12	(2)
2025	Turan	9	(3)
2026–	Kyzylzhar	26	(1)

International career^{‡}
2018–	Kazakhstan	17	(1)
- * Club domestic league appearances and goals as of 1 November 2026 ‡ National team caps and goals as of 4 January 2024

Yury Vladimirovich Pertsukh (Russian: Юрий Владимирович Перцух; born 13 May 1996) is a Kazakhstani footballer who plays for Kyzylzhar and the Kazakhstan national football team.

== Career ==
=== Club ===
On 24 November 2017, FC Astana announced the signing of Pertsukh.

On 28 July 2018, Pertsukh joined Atyrau on loan for the remainder of the 2018 season.

On 1 January 2024, Yelimay announced the signing of Pertsukh.

== Career statistics ==
=== Club ===
As of match played 29 October 2023

Club	Season	League			National Cup		Continental		Other		Total	
Club	Season	Division	Apps	Goals	Apps	Goals	Apps	Goals	Apps	Goals	Apps	Goals
Akzhayik	2017	Kazakhstan Premier League	24	2	1	0	-		1	0	26	2
Astana	2018	Kazakhstan Premier League	6	1	0	0	0	0	1	0	7	1
Astana	2019	Kazakhstan Premier League	29	2	0	0	7	0	1	0	37	2
Astana	2020	Kazakhstan Premier League	9	0	0	0	1	0	0	0	10	0
Astana	2021	Kazakhstan Premier League	0	0	0	0	0	0	0	0	0	0
Astana	2022	Kazakhstan Premier League	9	1	6	2	2	0	0	0	17	3
Astana	Total		53	4	6	2	10	0	2	0	48	3
Atyrau (loan)	2018	Kazakhstan Premier League	10	1	0	0	-		-		10	1
Aktobe (loan)	2022	Kazakhstan Premier League	18	1	4	0	-		-		22	1
Shakhter Karagandy	2023	Kazakhstan Premier League	25	2	3	1	-		-		28	3
Career total			130	10	14	3	10	0	3	0	157	13

=== International ===
Kazakhstan national team
Year	Apps	Goals
2018	3	0
2019	10	1
2020	4	0
Total	17	1

Statistics accurate as of match played 11 November 2020

=== International goals ===
Scores and results list Kazakhstan's goal tally first.

No.	Date	Venue	Opponent	Score	Result	Competition
1.	21 March 2019	Astana Arena, Astana, Kazakhstan	Scotland	1–0	3–0	UEFA Euro 2020 qualification
