= Jovan Nikolić (footballer, born 1991) =

Montenegrin footballer (born 1991)

Personal information
- Full name: Jovan Nikolić
- Date of birth: 21 July 1991 (age 35)
- Place of birth: Nikšić, SFR Yugoslavia
- Height: 1.81 m (5 ft 11 1/2 in)
- Position: Midfielder

Team information
- Current team: Arsenal Tivat
- Number: 4

Senior career*
| Years | Team | Apps | (Gls) |
| 2008–2010 | Budućnost | 26 | (0) |
| 2010–2011 | Sutjeska Nikšić | 13 | (0) |
| 2011–2012 | Hajduk Kula | 2 | (0) |
| 2012–2015 | Sutjeska Nikšić | 71 | (3) |
| 2015 | Partizani Tirana | 0 | (0) |
| 2015–2016 | Sutjeska Nikšić | 32 | (3) |
| 2017 | Akzhayik | 29 | (0) |
| 2018–2019 | OFK Titograd | 66 | (1) |
| 2020 | Podgorica | 30 | (0) |
| 2021–2022 | Dečić | 45 | (0) |
| 2023 | Sutjeska | 14 | (0) |
| 2023–2024 | Voska Sport | 31 | (0) |
| 2024 | Igman Konjic | 9 | (0) |
| 2025– | Arsenal Tivat | 46 | (0) |

International career
| 2009–2011 | Montenegro U19 | 14 | (0) |
| 2010–2012 | Montenegro U21 | 2 | (0) |
- * Club domestic league appearances and goals as of 2 April 2025

Jovan Nikolić (Cyrillic: Joвaн Николић, born 21 July 1991) is a Montenegrin professional footballer who plays as a defensive midfielder for Arsenal Tivat.

== Club career ==
=== Budućnost Podgorica ===
He was part of the FK Budućnost Podgorica youth system and he made a debut for their senior squad in the 2008–09 Montenegrin First League. He played with them during the following two seasons, with the exception of the six-month loan to another Montenegrin top league club FK Sutjeska Nikšić during the 2010–11 season. While with Budućnost, he played in both 2009–10 and 2010–11 UEFA Europa League qualification matches.

=== Hajduk Kula ===
In summer 2011 he moved to Serbia and signed with FK Hajduk Kula. He made his debut in the 2011–12 Serbian SuperLiga round 2 home match against FK BSK Borča on 21 August 2011.

=== Sutjeska Nikšić ===
During the winter break of the 2011–12 season, he returned to Montenegro and rejoined FK Sutjeska Nikšić.

== International career ==
Jovan Nikolić had been a regular member of the Montenegro national under-19 football team since 2009, and since 2010 he occasionally received calls for the Montenegro national under-21 football team.

== Honours ==
Sutjeska

- Montenegrin First League: 2012–13, 2013–14
