= Matías Rubio =

Chilean footballer (born 1988)

Personal information
- Full name: Matías Martín Rubio Köstner
- Date of birth: 8 August 1988 (age 38)
- Place of birth: Santiago, Chile
- Height: 1.80 m (5 ft 11 in)
- Position: Forward

Youth career
- Universidad Católica

Senior career*
| Years | Team | Apps | (Gls) |
| 2007–2012 | Universidad Católica | 34 | (5) |
| 2011 | → Rangers (loan) | 35 | (3) |
| 2013 | Deportes Concepción | 8 | (0) |
| 2013–2014 | Unión La Calera | 23 | (1) |
| 2014–2015 | Deportes Temuco | 24 | (2) |
| 2016 | Rangers | 6 | (0) |
| 2016–2017 | Akzhayik | 17 | (2) |
| 2019 | Colchagua | 20 | (3) |
| 2020–2022 | Deportes Recoleta | 65 | (20) |
| Total | | 232 | (36) |
- * Club domestic league appearances and goals

Matías Martín Rubio Köstner (born 8 August 1988) is a Chilean former professional footballer who played as a forward.

== Career ==
In August 2016, Rubio joined Kazakhstan Premier League side FC Akzhayik.

He retired at the end of the 2022 season, as a player of Deportes Recoleta.

At international level, Rubio was part of a Chile under-25 squad in a training session led by Claudio Borghi in May 2011, being a player of Rangers de Talca.

== Personal life ==
He is a member of a football family nicknamed "Rubio Dynasty" since his grandfather Ildefonso, his father Hugo, and his two brothers, Eduardo and Diego, were or are professional footballers.

== Post-retirement ==
Following his retirement, Rubio started a sports complex and a football academy for seniors.

== Honours ==
Universidad Católica

- Primera División de Chile: 2010
