= Didar Zhalmukan =

Kazakhstani footballer

Personal information
- Full name: Didar Kayratuly Zhalmukan
- Date of birth: 22 May 1996 (age 30)
- Place of birth: Shubarkuduk, Temir, Aktobe Region, Kazakhstan
- Height: 1.70 m (5 ft 7 in)
- Position: Midfielder

Team information
- Current team: Turan
- Number: 73

Senior career*
Years	Team	Apps	(Gls)
2014–2017	Aktobe	60	(11)
2017–2021	Astana	36	(5)
2017–2018	→ Tobol (loan)	11	(0)
2018	→ Aktobe (loan)	4	(0)
2018–2019	→ Atyrau (loan)	10	(0)
2021	Aktobe	22	(2)
2022–2025	Kaisar	69	(8)
2026–	Turan	3	(1)

International career
2012–2013	Kazakhstan U-17	3	(0)
2015	Kazakhstan U-19	3	(0)
2017–2019	Kazakhstan U-21	10	(3)
- * Club domestic league appearances and goals as of 2 November 2026

Didar Kayratuly Zhalmukan (Kazakh: Дидар Қайратұлы Жалмұқан; born 22 May 1996) is a Kazakhstani footballer who plays for Turan in the Kazakhstan Premier League.

== Career ==
Zhalmukan started his senior career with Aktobe. In 2017, he signed for Astana in the Kazakhstan Premier League, where he has made twenty-eight appearances and scored five goals. After that, he played for Tobol, and Atyrau.
