= Petr Atoyan Stadium =

Football stadium in Oral, Kazakhstan

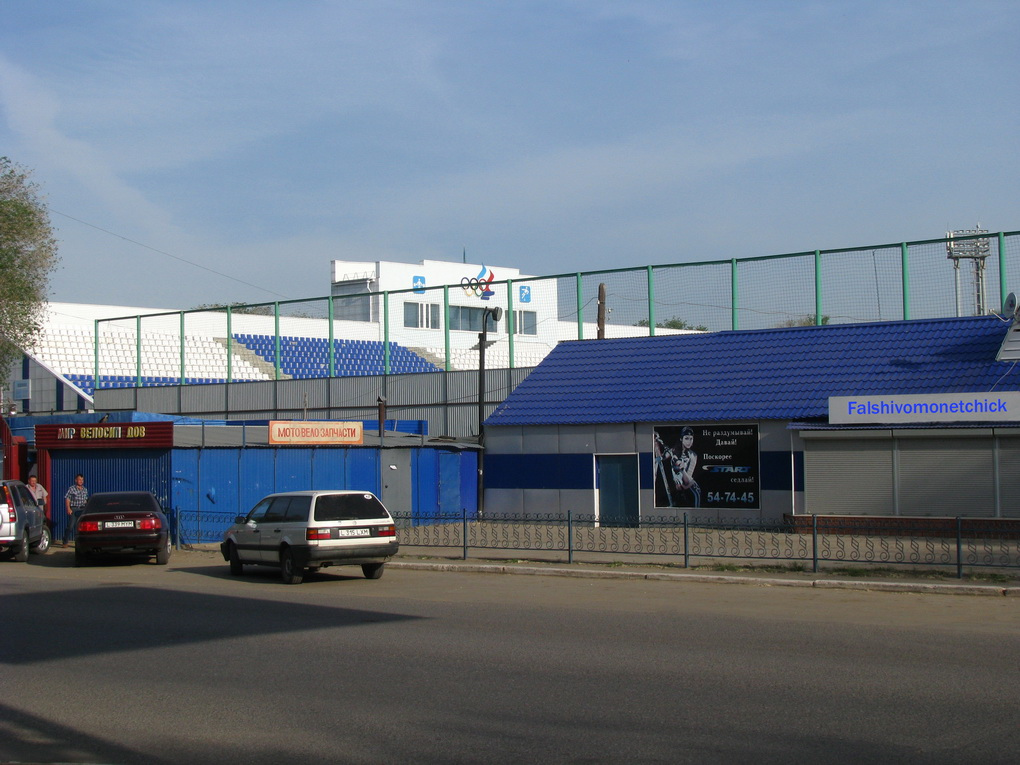
- Interactive map of Petr Atoyan Stadium
- Location: Oral, Kazakhstan
- Coordinates: 51°12′43″N 51°21′3″E
- Owner: FC Akzhayik
- Operator: FC Akzhayik
- Capacity: 8,320

Construction
- Opened: 1927
- Renovated: 2003

Tenant
- FC Akzhayik

Petr Atoyan Stadium is a football stadium in Oral, Kazakhstan. It is the home stadium of FC Akzhayik of the Kazakhstan Premier League and was opened 1927. The stadium holds 8,320 spectators.

In 1996 it was renamed Petr Atojan, an honorary citizen of Uralsk.

== History ==
The stadium is the oldest of all currently active stadiums in Kazakhstan. It opened on 29 May 1927 with a game between the city team and the cavalry regiment team. All Urals football clubs that took part in the USSR championship and later in Kazakhstan played their home games in this stadium. The stadium also hosts athletics competitions at city and regional level. Ball hockey, basketball and handball tournaments have been held at the stadium at various times. The biggest event hosted was the World Junior Ice Hockey Championship in 1998.

== Reconstruction ==
In 2003 the stadium was refurbished. The refurbished stadium was planned in accordance with global standards, but later this decision was reversed. Today, the stadium's turf is considered one of the best in the country.
