= Denis Glavina =

Croatian footballer (born 1986)

Personal information
- Date of birth: 3 March 1986 (age 40)
- Place of birth: Čakovec, SFR Yugoslavia
- Height: 1.85 m (6 ft 1 in)
- Position: Left winger

Team information
- Current team: Hrvati

Youth career
- 1996: Čakovec
- 1996–1997: Torpedo Križovec
- 1997–2001: Čakovec
- 2001–2003: Dinamo Zagreb

Senior career*
Years	Team	Apps	(Gls)
2004–2008	Dynamo Kyiv	0	(0)
2004–2005	→ Dynamo-2 Kyiv	22	(2)
2005–2006	→ Vorskla Poltava (loan)	29	(6)
2006	→ Dnipro Dnipropetrovsk (loan)	9	(0)
2007–2008	→ Vorskla Poltava (loan)	38	(5)
2008–2010	Vorskla Poltava	27	(3)
2009	→ Dinamo Zagreb (loan)	4	(0)
2010–2011	Arka Gdynia	20	(1)
2012	Varaždin	3	(0)
2012–2015	RNK Split	65	(5)
2015	Zavrč	8	(0)
2016–2017	Tobol	33	(1)
2017	Akzhayik	14	(2)
2018	Zhetysu	14	(0)
2018–2020	Akzhayik	13	(0)
2020	Varaždin	4	(0)
2020–2022	Međimurje	48	(3)
2022–2023	UFC Rohrbach-Berg	26	(1)
2023–	Hrvati	23	(4)

International career
2002	Croatia U16	6	(4)
2002–2003	Croatia U17	13	(5)
2004–2005	Croatia U19	5	(1)
2007	Croatia U20	1	(0)
2006–2007	Croatia U21	8	(0)
- * Club domestic league appearances and goals as of 21 April 2024

Denis Glavina (pronounced [deːnis ɡlaʋina]; born 3 March 1986) is a Croatian footballer who plays as a left winger for Hrvati.

== Club career ==
Glavina transferred to Dynamo Kyiv from Dinamo Zagreb in January 2004, but never appeared in a league match for Dynamo. He spent the 2006–07 and 2007–08 seasons on loan at Dnipro Dnipropetrovsk and Vorskla, respectively, before signing a permanent deal with Vorskla in June 2008. Glavina appeared in 8 league matches during the 2006–07 season and 26 league matches during the 2007–08 season, scoring three goals.

On 7 July 2009 he was loaned back to his first senior club, Dinamo Zagreb. At the start of the season he featured in both matches of UEFA Champions League qualifiers against Red Bull Salzburg.

He signed a two-year contract with Polish club Arka Gdynia on 9 July 2010. He was released from Arka Gdynia on 30 June 2011. In February 2012, Glavina joined Varaždin. In August 2012, Glavina signed a two-year contract with RNK Split. In 2020 he joined Varaždin, a club not associated with the Varaždin team he played with earlier in his career, which folded in 2015.

== International career ==
Glavina represented Croatia at youth international levels, playing for under-17, under-19 and under-21 teams, earning a total of 33 caps and scoring 10 goals.

== Personal life ==
Glavina is married to a Ukrainian woman Kateryna from Dnipro.

== Honours ==
Vorskla Poltava

- Ukrainian Cup: 2008–09
