= Ebong =

Ebong is a surname. Notable people with the surname include:

- Enoh T. Ebong (fl. 1997), Nigerian-American attorney and trade official
- Max Ebong (born 1999), Belarusian footballer
- Ololade Ebong (fl. 2019), Nollywood film director and cinematographer
- Uforo Ebong (born 1989), Nigerian producer and songwriter
