= 2021 FC Astana season =

FC Astana
2021 season
- Chairman: Sayan Khamitzhanov
- Manager: Andrey Tikhonov (until 5 November); Nurken Mazbaev (Interim) (23 April - 2 May); Vladimir Yezhurov (Interim) (5 November - 21 November); Srđan Blagojević (from 21 November)
- Stadium: Astana Arena
- Premier League: 2nd
- Kazakhstan Cup: Semi-finals vs Kairat
- Super Cup: Runners-up
- Europa Conference League: Third Qualifying round vs KuPS
- Top goalscorer: League: Marin Tomasov (17); All: Marin Tomasov (22)
- Highest home attendance: 5,500 vs Kairat (23 May 2021)
- Lowest home attendance: 0 vs Caspiy (19 March 2021) 0 vs Atyrau (10 April 2021); 0 vs Kyzylzhar (18 April 2021); 0 vs Akzhayik (28 April 2021); 0 vs Aktobe (16 July 2021); 0 vs Aris Thessaloniki (22 July 2021); 0 vs Akzhayik (25 July 2021); 0 vs Kaisar (8 August 2021); 0 vs KuPS (12 August 2021) 0 vs Caspiy (21 August 2021)
- Average home league attendance: 1,400 (7 November 2021)
Home colours	Away colours

The 2021 FC Astana season was the thirteenth successive season that Astana played in the Kazakhstan Premier League, the highest tier of association football in Kazakhstan. The finished the season 2nd, behind Tobol, reached the Semifinals of the Kazakhstan Cup and were knocked out of the Europa Conference League by KuPS at the Third Qualifying Round stage.

== Season events ==
On 5 February, Astana sold Pieros Sotiriou to Ludogorets Razgrad, whilst Rúnar Már Sigurjónsson left Astana on 8 February.

On 15 February, Astana announced the signing of Varazdat Haroyan from Tambov. Three days later, Astana announced the signing of Semir Smajlagić from ND Gorica after he impressed on trial.

On 21 February, Astana announced the signing of Aleksandr Zarutskiy from Kaisar. Two days later, 23 February, Astana announced the return of Roman Murtazayev from Tobol.

On 2 March, Astana confirmed that Nenad Erić had left the club after 10 years, and that they had retired the #1 shirt, whilst also confirming the signing of Valeriu Ciupercă from Tambov.

On 16 March, Astana announced that they had re-signed Islambek Kuat after he'd previously played for the club between 2010 and 2014.

On 2 April, Astana signed Abat Aymbetov on loan from Krylia Sovetov until the summer transfer window.

On 7 April, Astana announced the signing of Cadete from Atlético San Luis.

Between the end of April and the start of May, Nurken Mazbaev took temporary charge of Astana whilst Andrey Tikhonov recovered from illness.

On 24 June, Astana announced the departure of Varazdat Haroyan to Cádiz, with defender Eneo Bitri signing for Astana the following day, 25 June.

On 13 July, Krylia Sovetov confirmed that Abat Aymbetov's loan deal with Astana had been extended until the end of the season.

On 16 July, Astana announced that Roman Murtazayev had left the club after his contract was terminated by mutual agreement.

On 5 November, Astana announced the departure of Andrey Tikhonov as their manager by mutual consent, with Antonio Rukavina announcing his retirement from football on 11 November.

On 21 November, Srđan Blagojević was announced as the clubs new head coach.

On 21 December, Astana signed new contracts with Aleksandr Zarutskiy and Abzal Beysebekov until the end of 2023, and Islambek Kuat until the end of 2024.

On 30 December, Astana announced that Valeriu Ciupercă had left the club after his contract was cancelled by mutual agreement.

The following day, Astana announced that Stanislav Basmanov, Vladislav Prokopenko, Sultan Sagnayev and Meyrambek Kalmyrza had all signed new contracts with the club.

== Squad ==
As of match played 20 November 2021

No.	Name	Nationality	Position	Date of birth (age)	Signed from	Signed in	Contract ends	Apps.	Goals
Goalkeepers
22	Dmytro Nepohodov	(Kazakhstan)	GK	17 February 1988 (aged 33)	Tobol	2019		34	0
31	Danil Podymksy	(Kazakhstan)	GK	13 May 1998 (aged 23)	Academy	2016		1	0
55	Aleksandr Zarutskiy	(Kazakhstan)	GK	26 August 1993 (aged 28)	Kaisar	2021	2023	16	0
Defenders
5	Mark Gurman	(Kazakhstan)	DF	9 February 1989 (aged 32)	Kaisar	2021		79	1
15	Abzal Beisebekov	(Kazakhstan)	DF	30 November 1992 (aged 28)	Vostok	2012	2023	337	14
18	Sagi Sovet	(Kazakhstan)	DF	15 March 2000 (aged 21)	Academy	2016		14	0
19	Lev Skvortsov	(Kazakhstan)	DF	2 February 2000 (aged 21)	Academy	2018		9	0
21	Cadete	(Spain)	DF	24 June 1994 (aged 27)	Atlético San Luis	2021		30	0
24	Luka Šimunović	(Croatia)	DF	24 May 1997 (aged 24)	Shakhtyor Soligorsk	2019	2021	76	0
26	Eneo Bitri	(Albania)	DF	26 August 1996 (aged 25)	Partizani Tirana	2021		17	2
33	Žarko Tomašević	(Montenegro)	DF	22 February 1990 (aged 31)	Oostende	2019		48	6
34	Ruslan Pistol	(Kazakhstan)	DF	2 September 2002 (aged 19)	Academy	2021		1	0
52	Rakhat Maratov	(Kazakhstan)	DF	28 April 2001 (aged 20)	Academy	2021		2	0
57	Sanzhar Shurakhanov	(Kazakhstan)	DF	6 December 2001 (aged 19)	Academy	2021		3	0
63	Dias Kanatkali	(Kazakhstan)	DF	14 February 2001 (aged 20)	Academy	2021		1	0
82	Aydos Kumarov	(Kazakhstan)	DF	27 February 2002 (aged 19)	Academy	2021		1	0
89	Bauyrzhan Akhaev	(Kazakhstan)	DF	26 September 2001 (aged 20)	Academy	2021		2	0
94	Yuri Akhanov	(Kazakhstan)	DF	31 July 2002 (aged 19)	Academy	2021		1	0
Midfielders
7	Max Ebong	(Belarus)	MF	26 August 1999 (aged 22)	Shakhtyor Soligorsk	2020	2023	50	6
8	Islambek Kuat	(Kazakhstan)	MF	12 January 1993 (aged 28)	Khimki	2021	2024	59	4
10	Marin Tomasov	(Croatia)	MF	31 August 1987 (aged 34)	Rijeka	2018	2022	162	75
11	Tigran Barseghyan	(Armenia)	MF	22 September 1993 (aged 28)	Kaisar	2020	2021	57	15
29	Madi Zhakypbayev	(Kazakhstan)	MF	21 March 2000 (aged 21)	Academy	2016		11	0
58	Azamat Nurzhanuly	(Kazakhstan)	MF	8 February 2001 (aged 20)	Academy	2021		2	0
65	Meyrambek Kalmyrza	(Kazakhstan)	MF	15 December 2001 (aged 19)	Academy	2020		7	0
70	Sultan Sagnayev	(Kazakhstan)	MF	14 January 2000 (aged 21)	Academy	2016		35	0
77	Pedro Eugénio	(Portugal)	MF	26 June 1990 (aged 31)	Taraz	2021		13	0
91	Aldair Adilov	(Kazakhstan)	MF	11 June 2002 (aged 19)	Energetik-BGU Minsk	2021		1	0
92	Valeriu Ciupercă	(Moldova)	MF	12 June 1992 (aged 29)	Tambov	2021		34	4
Forwards
17	Abat Aymbetov	(Kazakhstan)	FW	7 August 1995 (aged 26)	loan from Krylia Sovetov	2021	2021	23	9
20	Fatos Bećiraj	(Montenegro)	FW	5 May 1988 (aged 33)	Wisła Kraków	2021		18	2
53	Andrey Berezutskiy	(Kazakhstan)	FW	30 January 2004 (aged 17)	Academy	2021		1	0
72	Stanislav Basmanov	(Kazakhstan)	FW	24 June 2001 (aged 20)	Academy	2020		14	0
80	Vladislav Prokopenko	(Kazakhstan)	FW	1 July 2000 (aged 21)	Academy	2016		32	1
97	Adilkhan Sabyr	(Kazakhstan)	FW	11 September 2001 (aged 20)	Academy	2021		1	0
Players away on loan
28	Yuriy Pertsukh	(Kazakhstan)	MF	13 May 1996 (aged 25)	Akzhayik	2018		54	3
32	Rangelo Janga	(Curaçao)	FW	16 April 1992 (aged 29)	KAA Gent	2018		64	11
55	Talgat Kusyapov	(Kazakhstan)	DF	14 February 1999 (aged 22)	Academy	2016		2	0
81	Ramazan Karimov	(Kazakhstan)	FW	5 July 1999 (aged 22)	Academy	2018		6	1
87	Zhaslan Kairkenov	(Kazakhstan)	MF	27 March 2000 (aged 21)	Academy	2016		2	0
99	Semir Smajlagić	(Bosnia and Herzegovina)	FW	18 September 1998 (aged 23)	ND Gorica	2021		13	0
Left during the season
2	Antonio Rukavina	(Serbia)	DF	26 January 1984 (aged 37)	Villarreal	2018	2021	105	0
3	Varazdat Haroyan	(Armenia)	DF	24 August 1992 (aged 29)	Tambov	2021		15	1
9	Dorin Rotariu	(Romania)	MF	29 July 1995 (aged 26)	Club Brugge	2019	2022	64	10
45	Roman Murtazayev	(Kazakhstan)	FW	10 September 1993 (aged 28)	Tobol	2021		152	30

=== On loan ===
Note: Flags indicate national team as defined under FIFA eligibility rules; some limited exceptions apply. Players may hold more than one non-FIFA nationality.

No.	Pos.	Nation	Player
28	MF	KAZ	Yury Pertsukh (at Aktobe)
32	FW	CUW	Rangelo Janga (at Apollon Limassol)
55	DF	KAZ	Talgat Kusyapov (at Caspiy)

No.	Pos.	Nation	Player
81	FW	KAZ	Ramazan Karimov (at Caspiy)
87	MF	KAZ	Zhaslan Kairkenov (at Atyrau)
99	FW	BIH	Semir Smajlagić (at Kyzylzhar)

== Transfers ==
=== In ===
Date	Position	Nationality	Name	From	Fee	Ref.
15 February 2021	DF	(Armenia)	Varazdat Haroyan	Tambov	Undisclosed	
18 February 2021	FW	(Bosnia and Herzegovina)	Semir Smajlagić	ND Gorica	Undisclosed	
21 February 2021	GK	(Kazakhstan)	Aleksandr Zarutskiy	Kaisar	Undisclosed	
23 February 2021	FW	(Kazakhstan)	Roman Murtazayev	Tobol	Free	
28 February 2021	DF	(Kazakhstan)	Mark Gurman	Kaisar	Undisclosed	
2 March 2021	MF	(Moldova)	Valeriu Ciupercă	Tambov	Undisclosed	
5 March 2021	MF	(Kazakhstan)	Aldair Adilov	Energetik-BGU Minsk	Undisclosed	
16 March 2021	MF	(Kazakhstan)	Islambek Kuat	Khimki	Free	
7 April 2021	DF	(Spain)	Cadete	Atlético San Luis	Free	
25 June 2021	DF	(Albania)	Eneo Bitri	Partizani Tirana	Undisclosed	
10 July 2021	MF	(Portugal)	Pedro Eugénio	Taraz	Undisclosed	
10 July 2021	FW	(Montenegro)	Fatos Bećiraj	Wisła Kraków	Undisclosed	

=== Loans in ===
Date from	Position	Nationality	Name	From	Date to	Ref.
2 April 2021	FW	(Kazakhstan)	Abat Aymbetov	Krylia Sovetov	End of season	

=== Out ===
Date	Position	Nationality	Name	To	Fee	Ref.
5 February 2021	FW	(Cyprus)	Pieros Sotiriou	Ludogorets Razgrad	Undisclosed	
6 February 2021	MF	(Kazakhstan)	Didar Zhalmukan	Aktobe	Undisclosed	
8 February 2021	MF	(Iceland)	Rúnar Már Sigurjónsson	CFR Cluj	Undisclosed	
27 February 2021	DF	(Kazakhstan)	Dinmukhamed Kashken	Aktobe	Undisclosed	
24 June 2021	DF	(Armenia)	Varazdat Haroyan	Cádiz	Undisclosed	

=== Loans out ===
Date from	Position	Nationality	Name	To	Date to	Ref.
22 August 2020	FW	(Curaçao)	Rangelo Janga	NEC Nijmegen	30 June 2021	
1 March 2020	DF	(Kazakhstan)	Talgat Kusyapov	Caspiy	End of season	
1 March 2020	FW	(Kazakhstan)	Ramazan Karimov	Caspiy	End of season	
8 April 2020	MF	(Kazakhstan)	Zhaslan Kairkenov	Atyrau	End of season	
6 February 2021	MF	(Kazakhstan)	Yuriy Pertsukh	Aktobe	Undisclosed	
7 July 2021	FW	(Curaçao)	Rangelo Janga	Apollon Limassol	30 June 2022	

=== Released ===
Date	Position	Nationality	Name	Joined	Date	Ref.
12 January 2021	DF	(Kazakhstan)	Dmitri Shomko	Rotor Volgograd	18 January 2021	
13 January 2021	FW	(Kazakhstan)	Aleksey Shchotkin	Rotor Volgograd	18 January 2021	
31 January 2021	DF	(Kazakhstan)	Yuriy Logvinenko	Rotor Volgograd	31 January 2021	
17 February 2021	DF	(Kazakhstan)	Yevgeny Postnikov	Retired		
2 March 2021	GK	(Kazakhstan)	Nenad Erić	Retired		
17 June 2021	MF	(Romania)	Dorin Rotariu	Ludogorets Razgrad	17 June 2021	
16 July 2021	FW	(Kazakhstan)	Roman Murtazayev	Baltika Kaliningrad	27 July 2021	
11 November 2021	DF	(Serbia)	Antonio Rukavina	Retired		
30 December 2021	MF	(Moldova)	Valeriu Ciupercă	Kuban Krasnodar	17 March 2022	
31 December 2021	DF	(Croatia)	Luka Šimunović	Šibenik	9 March 2022	
31 December 2021	DF	(Kazakhstan)	Mark Gurman	Kyzylzhar	24 February 2022	
31 December 2021	DF	(Kazakhstan)	Lev Skvortsov	Turan		
31 December 2021	MF	(Armenia)	Tigran Barseghyan	Slovan Bratislava	1 January 2022	
31 December 2021	MF	(Kazakhstan)	Aldair Adilov	Kyzylzhar	24 February 2022	
31 December 2021	MF	(Kazakhstan)	Madi Zhakipbayev			

=== Trial ===
Date from	Position	Nationality	Name	Last club	Date end	Ref.
February 2021	FW	(Bosnia and Herzegovina)	Semir Smajlagić	ND Gorica	18 February 2021	
February 2021	FW	(Kazakhstan)	Roman Murtazayev	Tobol		

== Friendlies ==
10 February 2021	Astana (Kazakhstan)	1–4	(Russia) Khimki	Belek, Turkey
20:00 (UTC+6)	Goal	Report	Goal

13 February 2021	Astana (Kazakhstan)	2–1	(Russia) Chayka Peschanokopskoye	Belek, Turkey
20:30 (UTC+6)	S.Smajlagić 31'; Barseghyan 76'	Report	Kartashov 82'

17 February 2021	Astana (Kazakhstan)	3–3	(Russia) Baltika Kaliningrad	Belek, Turkey
14:00 (UTC+6)	Kazayev 39'; Alshin 57'; Markin 82' (pen.)	Report	Murtazayev 37', 62'; Basmanov 69'

17 February 2021	Astana (Kazakhstan)	1–2	(Russia) Torpedo Moscow	Belek, Turkey
20:00 (UTC+6)	S.Smajlagic 87'	Report	Kapliyenko 28'; Ryazantsev 58'

21 February 2021	Astana (Kazakhstan)	6–2	(Belarus) Rukh Brest	Belek, Turkey
20:00 (UTC+6)	Savitski 8'; Bakaj 72' (pen.)	Report	S.Smajlagić 18', 77'; Beisebekov 29'; Barseghyan 40'; Rukavina 45+1'; Tomasov 56'

25 February 2021	Astana (Kazakhstan)	0–2	(Russia) SKA Rostov-on-Don	Belek, Turkey
14:00 (UTC+6)		Report	Goal

10 October 2021	Astana	4–1	Okzhetpes
(UTC+6)	Basmanov; Bitri; V.Tyulyupov; Aymbetov	Report	Goal

== Competitions ==
=== Overview ===
Competition	First match	Last match	Starting round	Final position	Record							
Competition	First match	Last match	Starting round	Final position	Pld	W	D	L	GF	GA	GD	Win %
Premier League	12 March 2021	30 October 2021	Matchday 1	2nd	26	17	6	3	53	25	+28	65.38
Kazakhstan Cup	10 July 2021	20 November 2021	Group Stage	Semifinal	9	3	3	3	9	15	−6	33.33
Super Cup	2 March 2021	6 March 2021	Semifinal	Runners Up	2	1	1	0	3	2	+1	50.00
Europa Conference League	22 July 2021	12 August 2021	Second Qualifying Round	Third Qualifying Round	4	1	1	2	7	7	+0	25.00
Total					41	22	11	8	72	49	+23	53.66

Last updated: 20 November 2021
Source: Competitions

=== Super Cup ===
2 March 2021 Semifinal	Shakhter Karagandy	0–2	Astana	Turkistan
15:00 (UTC+6)	Graf (yellow card) 40'; Udo (yellow card) 75'	Report	Tomašević 17'; Barseghyan 74'; Šimunović (yellow card) 78'	Stadium: Turkistan Arena; Attendance: 0 Referee: Grigory Moskovchenko

6 March 2021 Final	Tobol	1–1 (5–4 p)	Astana	Turkistan
15:00 (UTC+6)	Malyi 15' (yellow card) 81'; Nurgaliev (yellow card) 77'; Abilgazy (yellow card) 89'	Report	S.Sovet (yellow card) 21'; Barseghyan (yellow card) 45+2'; S.Smajlagić (yellow card) 48'; Ciupercă (yellow card) 76'; Tomasov 90+1'	Stadium: Turkistan Arena; Attendance: 2,000; Referee: Denis Izmailov
	Penalties
	Muzhikov (penalty scored); Amanović (penalty scored); Tagybergen (penalty scored); Jovančić (penalty scored); Nurgaliev (penalty scored)		(penalty scored) Beisebekov; (penalty scored) Ciupercă; (penalty missed) Murtazayev; (penalty scored) Barseghyan; (penalty scored) Tomasov

=== Premier League ===
==== Results summary ====
Overall								Home						Away					
Pld	W	D	L	GF	GA	GD	Pts	W	D	L	GF	GA	GD	W	D	L	GF	GA	GD
26	17	6	3	52	24	+28	57	9	3	1	26	11	+15	8	3	2	26	13	+13

Last updated: 30 October 2021.
Source: See Results

==== Results by round ====
Round	1	2	3	4	5	6	7	8	9	10	11	12	13	14	15	16	17	18	19	20	21	22	23	24	25	26
Ground	A	H	A	H	A	H	A	H	A	A	H	A	H	A	H	A	H	A	H	A	H	H	A	H	A	H
Result	D	W	D	W	W	W	W	W	W	W	W	W	D	D	D	W	L	L	W	W	W	W	W	W	L	D
Position	4	2	3	2	1	1	1	1	1	1	1	1	1	1	1	1	2	2	2	2	1	1	1	1	2	2

Source: See Results
A = Away; H = Home; W = Win; D = Draw; L = Loss

==== Results ====
13 March 2021 1	Turan	2–2	Astana	Turkistan
17:00 (UTC+6)	Nusserbayev 18'; A.Mukhamed (yellow card) 36'; Adams (yellow card) 41'; M.Tolebek 68'	Report	Tomasov 9'; Šimunović (yellow card) 44'; Beisebekov 54'; S.Smajlagić (yellow card) 61'; S.Sovet (yellow card) 88'	Stadium: Turkistan Arena; Attendance: 1,000; Referee: Aydin Rakhimbaev

19 March 2021 2	Astana	2–0	Caspiy	Nur-Sultan
18:00 (UTC+6)	Ebong 17' (yellow card) 86'; Tomasov 45+1' (pen.) (yellow card) 65'; S.Smajlagić (yellow card) 84'; Haroyan (yellow card) 90'	Report	A.Nabikhanov (yellow card) 25'; W.Sahli (yellow card) 45+1'	Stadium: Astana Arena; Attendance: 0 Referee: Bakhyt Kyzylbaev
Note: Match played behind closed doors due to the COVID-19 pandemic in Kazakhstan.

5 April 2021 3	Tobol	1–1	Astana	Kostanay
19:00 (UTC+6)	S.Zharynbetov (yellow card) 15'; Amanović (yellow card) 31'; Tomašević 31' (o.g.); Malyi (yellow card) 45+1'; Tagybergen (yellow card) 73'	Report	Rukavina (yellow card) 42'; Tomašević 83'	Stadium: Central Stadium; Attendance: 600; Referee: Denis Izmailov

10 April 2021 4	Astana	6–2	Atyrau	Nur-Sultan
19:00 (UTC+6)	Aimbetov 23', 64'; Beisebekov 30', 36'; Haroyan (yellow card) 34'; Šimunović (yellow card) 39'; S.Sagnayev (yellow card) 85'; Murtazayev 90+1', 90+3'	Report	Junior 10' (penalty missed) 35'; Guz (yellow card) 82'; Bryan 90+1' (yellow card) 90+1'	Stadium: Astana Arena; Attendance: 0 Referee: Bolat Karlibaev
Note: Match played behind closed doors due to the COVID-19 pandemic in Kazakhstan.

14 April 2021 5	Ordabasy	1–4	Astana	Shymkent
15:00 (UTC+6)	Tungyshbayev 22'; Dosmagambetov (yellow card) 48'; Simčević (yellow card) 51'; B.Kairov (yellow card) 80'	Report	Aimbetov 19', 60'; Ciupercă (yellow card) 26'; Tomasov (yellow card) 36' (goal) 78'; Barseghyan 53' (pen.); Nepohodov (yellow card) 87'	Stadium: Kazhymukan Munaitpasov Stadium; Attendance: 0 Referee: Igor Chesnokov
Note: Match played behind closed doors due to the COVID-19 pandemic in Kazakhstan.

18 April 2021 6	Astana	3–1	Kyzylzhar	Nur-Sultan
16:00 (UTC+6)	Beisebekov 4' (yellow card) 60'; Tomasov 65'; Ebong 67'; Aimbetov (yellow card) 27'	Report	A.Kasym 40'; A.Saparov (yellow card) 54'	Stadium: Astana Arena; Attendance: 0 Referee: Bulat Sariev
Note: Match played behind closed doors due to the COVID-19 pandemic in Kazakhstan.

23 April 2021 7	Shakhter Karagandy	0–1	Astana	Nur-Sultan
17:00 (UTC+6)	Buyvolov (yellow card) 57'; D.Atanaskoski (yellow card) 62'; Sultanov (yellow card) 90+2'	Report	Ciupercă 19' (yellow card) 64'; Tomašević (yellow card) 39'; Gurman (yellow card) 90'; Rukavina (yellow card) 90+3'	Stadium: Astana Arena; Attendance: 0 Referee: Denis Izmailov
Note: Match played at the Astana Arena in Nur-Sultan instead of Shakhter's regular Shakhter Stadium in Karaganda. Match played behind closed doors due to the COVID-19 pandemic in Kazakhstan.

28 April 2021 8	Astana	1–0	Akzhayik	Nur-Sultan
17:00 (UTC+6)	Barseghyan 6' (yellow card) 40'	Report	E.Abdrakhmanov (yellow card) 42'; M.Sapanov (yellow card) 55'; I.Antipov (yellow card) 75'; Takulov (yellow card) 80'	Stadium: Astana Arena; Attendance: 0 Referee: Anton Kuchma
Note: Match played behind closed doors due to the COVID-19 pandemic in Kazakhstan.

2 May 2021 9	Aktobe	0–2	Astana	Aktobe
17:00 (UTC+6)	A.Tanzharikov (yellow card) 24'	Report	Tomasov 9'; Ciupercă 27'; Barseghyan (yellow card) 73'	Stadium: Central Stadium; Attendance: 0 Referee: Igor Chesnokov
Note: Match played behind closed doors due to the COVID-19 pandemic in Kazakhstan.

8 May 2021 10	Taraz	0–1	Astana	Taraz
17:00 (UTC+6)	Baytana (yellow card) 26'; Obilor (yellow card) 30'; B.Shaykhov (yellow card) 45+1'; D.Karaman (yellow card) 89'	Report	Barseghyan (yellow card) 26'; Beisebekov 53'; Kuat (yellow card) 90+4'	Stadium: Central Stadium; Attendance: 2,500; Referee: Bulat Sariev

14 May 2021 11	Astana	1–0	Zhetysu	Nur-Sultan
20:00 (UTC+6)	Tomasov 4'; Ebong (yellow card) 44'; Barseghyan (yellow card) 57'; Nepohodov (yellow card) 71'; Murtazayev (yellow card) 86'; Beisebekov (yellow card) 90'	Report	Dmitrijev (yellow card) 36'; S.Batyrkhanov (yellow card) 51'	Stadium: Astana Arena; Attendance: 2,500; Referee: Denis Tevyashov

18 May 2021 12	Kaisar	2–5	Astana	Kyzylorda
21:00 (UTC+6)	Potapov 43'; Bitang (yellow card) 49'; B.Kurmanbekuly (yellow card) 75'; Denković 88' (pen.)	Report	Tomasov 31', 61' (pen.) (yellow card) 64'; Haroyan 36'; Ebong 45+1'; Murtazayev 47'	Stadium: Gani Muratbayev Stadium; Attendance: 1,200; Referee: Artem Kuchin

23 May 2021 13	Astana	1–1	Kairat	Nur-Sultan
21:00 (UTC+6)	Haroyan (yellow card) 30'; Ciupercă (yellow card) 35'; Rukavina (yellow card) 36'; Beisebekov (yellow card) 40'; Tomasov (yellow card) 80'; Kuat (yellow card) 82'; Barseghyan 87'	Report	Abiken (yellow card) 25'; Alykulov (yellow card) 63'; Suyumbayev 90+1'	Stadium: Astana Arena; Attendance: 5,500; Referee: Denis Izmailov

29 May 2021 14	Caspiy	2–2	Astana	Aktau
18:00 (UTC+6)	M.Taykenov (yellow card) 45'; T.Kusyapov 52'; Darabayev 61'	Report	Barseghyan 8'; Murtazayev 30'; Kuat (yellow card) 46'; Šimunović (yellow card) 90'	Stadium: Zhastar Stadium; Attendance: 1,300; Referee: Igor Chesnokov

13 June 2021 15	Astana	1–1	Tobol	Nur-Sultan
19:00 (UTC+6)	Tomasov 44' (pen.); Rukavina (yellow card) 64'; Ciupercă (yellow card) 71'	Report	Amanović (yellow card) 22'; Nikolić 29' (yellow card) 62'; Manzorro (yellow card) 73'	Stadium: Astana Arena; Attendance: 3,200; Referee: Bulat Sariev

18 June 2021 16	Atyrau	0–2	Astana	Atyrau
20:00 (UTC+6)	Guz (yellow card) 48'	Report	Tomasov 4', 35'	Stadium: Munaishy Stadium; Attendance: 1,500; Referee: Alexander Gauser

22 June 2021 17	Astana	0–2	Ordabasy	Nur-Sultan
19:00 (UTC+6)	Haroyan (yellow card) 26'	Report	B.Kairov 22' (yellow card) 77'; João Paulo 24'; Fontanello (yellow card) 40'; Kleshchenko (yellow card) 56'; Astanov (yellow card) 82'; B.Shayzada (yellow card) 90+2'	Stadium: Astana Arena; Attendance: 1,500; Referee: Denis Izmailov

27 June 2021 18	Kyzylzhar	3–2	Astana	Petropavl
18:00 (UTC+6)	Drachenko 3'; Bushman 9'; D.Shmidt (yellow card) 56'; Zorić 68'	Report	Cadete (yellow card) 27'; Kuat (yellow card) 44' (goal) 51'; Aimbetov 85'; Basmanov (yellow card) 90+2'	Stadium: Karasai Stadium; Attendance: 1,800; Referee: Saken Bayimbet

2 July 2021 19	Astana	4–3	Shakhter Karagandy	Nur-Sultan
19:00 (UTC+6)	Ebong 6'; Ciupercă 26' (yellow card) 89'; Gurman (yellow card) 54'; Aimbetov 55' (yellow card) 56'; Barseghyan 77'	Report	I.Sviridov 41'; Najaryan 63'; Y.Kybyray (yellow card) 78'; J-A.Payruz (yellow card) 83'	Stadium: Astana Arena; Attendance: 1,800; Referee: Bolat Karlibaev

11 September 2021 20	Akzhayik	0–1	Astana	Oral
18:00 (UTC+6)	Shustikov (yellow card) 60'; Tapalov (yellow card) 90+3'	Report	Ciupercă 10'; Šimunović (yellow card) 36'; Kuat (yellow card) 49'	Stadium: Petr Atoyan Stadium; Attendance: 1,600; Referee: Grigory Moskovchenko

18 September 2021 21	Astana	2–1	Aktobe	Nur-Sultan
17:00 (UTC+6)	Bećiraj 4'; Tomasov 15'; Kuat (yellow card) 50'	Report	Fedin (penalty missed) 12' (yellow card) 65'; Korkishko 19'; N.Laktionov (yellow card) 57'; Adukor (yellow card) 60'; Yerlanov (yellow card) 60'	Stadium: Astana Arena; Attendance: 2,500; Referee: Alexander Gauser

27 September 2021 22	Astana	3–0	Taraz	Nur-Sultan
17:00 (UTC+6)	Tomasov 1', 21'; Barseghyan 7'; Kuat (yellow card) 90+3'	Report	Shakhmetov (yellow card) 50'	Stadium: Astana Arena; Attendance: 1,500; Referee: Alexander Zatula

2 October 2021 23	Zhetysu	1–3	Astana	Taldıqorğan
15:00 (UTC+6)	V.Okhronchuk (yellow card) 17'; S.Batyrkhanov (yellow card) 29'; Zhaksylykov 37'; D.Kalybaev (yellow card) 90+2'	Report	Tomasov 21', 39' (yellow card) 43'; Bećiraj 56'	Stadium: Zhetysu Stadium; Attendance: 800; Referee: Grigory Moskovchenko

17 October 2021 24	Astana	2–0	Kaisar	Nur-Sultan
18:00 (UTC+6)	Ciupercă (yellow card) 41'; Tomasov (penalty missed) 41' 89'; Barseghyan 74'	Report	Potapov (yellow card) 34'; Narzildayev (yellow card) 38'; Leonov (yellow card) 57'; Bayzhanov (yellow card) 66'	Stadium: Astana Arena; Attendance: 2,500; Referee: Elvira Nurmustafina

24 October 2021 25	Kairat	1–0	Astana	Almaty
15:00 (UTC+6)	Kosović 8'; Alves (yellow card) 20'; João Paulo (yellow card) 39'; Vágner Love (yellow card) 85'; Alip (yellow card) 90+3'	Report	Barseghyan (yellow card) 15'; Rukavina (yellow card) 37'; Tomašević (yellow card) 78'	Stadium: Central Stadium; Attendance: 9,500; Referee: Igor Chesnokov

30 October 2021 26	Astana	1–1	Turan	Nur-Sultan
16:00 (UTC+6)	Ebong 11' (yellow card) 74'; Ciupercă (red card) 78'	Report	Janković (yellow card) 14'; Kozubayev (yellow card) 58'; K.Kalmuratov (yellow card) 72'; A.Pasechenko (yellow card) 78'; Nuserbayev (yellow card) 78' (goal) 79'	Stadium: Astana Arena; Attendance: 2,000; Referee: Artem Kuchin

==== League table ====
Pos	Team	Pld	W	D	L	GF	GA	GD	Pts	Qualification or relegation
1	Tobol (C)	26	18	7	1	54	18	+36	61	Qualification for the Champions League first qualifying round
2	Astana	26	17	6	3	53	25	+28	57	Qualification for the Europa Conference League second qualifying round
3	Kairat	26	14	9	3	52	21	+31	51	Qualification for the Europa Conference League second qualifying round
4	Kyzylzhar	26	11	6	9	32	24	+8	39	Qualification for the Europa Conference League second qualifying round
5	Ordabasy	26	10	8	8	36	35	+1	38	

Source: UEFA, Soccerway
Rules for classification: 1) Points; 2) Goal difference; 3) Matches won; 4) Goals scored; 5) Away goals scored; 6) Head-to-head points; 7) Head-to-head matches won; 8) Head-to-head goal difference; 9) Head-to-head goals scored; 10) Head-to-head away goals scored; 11) Draw.
(C) Champions

=== Kazakhstan Cup ===
==== Group stage ====
Pos	Team	Pld	W	D	L	GF	GA	GD	Pts	Qualification
1	Kaisar (A)	6	3	2	1	6	2	+4	11	Advanced to Quarterfinals
2	Astana (A)	6	3	2	1	6	6	0	11	Advanced to Quarterfinals
3	Akzhayik	6	3	1	2	7	5	+2	10	
4	Aktobe	6	0	1	5	5	11	−6	1	

Updated to match(es) played on 15 August 2021. Source: PFLK
(A) Advance to a further round

10 July 2021 1	Kaisar	0–0	Astana	Kyzylorda
22:00 (UTC+6)	Bayzhanov (yellow card) 51'; Denković (yellow card) 57'; Bitang (yellow card) 77'	Report	S.Sagnaev (yellow card) 52'; Skvortsov (yellow card) 90+2'	Stadium: Gani Muratbayev Stadium; Attendance: 0 Referee: Alexander Zatul
Note: Match played behind closed doors

16 July 2021 2	Astana	3–2	Aktobe	Nur-Sultan
19:00 (UTC+6)	Tomasov 13'; A.Tanzharikov 48' (o.g.); Ebong (yellow card) 57'; Beisebekov (yellow card) 63'; Barseghyan 71'	Report	Žulpa (yellow card) 29'; A.Tanzharikov (yellow card) 30'; Chernyshov 45'; Orazov (yellow card) 53'; D.Kashken (yellow card) 73'; Logvinenko 80'; A.Azhimov (yellow card) 90'	Stadium: Astana Arena; Attendance: 2,000; Referee: Sergey Nozhenko

25 July 2021 3	Astana	1–0	Akzhayik	Nur-Sultan
21:00 (UTC+6)	Aymbetov 42'; Cadete (yellow card) 52'; Tomašević (yellow card) 61'; S.Sagnayev (yellow card) 73'; Gurman (yellow card) 86' (yellow-red card) 90+4'	Report	I.Antipov (yellow card) 7'; Kovtalyuk (yellow card) 20'; E.Abdrakhmanov (yellow card) 75'	Stadium: Astana Arena; Attendance: 0 Referee: Aydin Rakhimbaev
Note: Match played behind closed doors due to the COVID-19 pandemic in Kazakhstan.

1 August 2021 4	Akzhayik	3–0	Astana	Oral
19:00 (UTC+6)	Gashchenkov 34'; L.Imnadze 52'; Kozlov 58'	Report		Stadium: Petr Atoyan Stadium; Attendance: 1,600; Referee: Alexander Gauser

8 August 2021 5	Astana	1–0	Kaisar	Nur-Sultan
21:00 (UTC+6)	Barseghyan 2'; Ebong (yellow card) 53'; Beysebekov (yellow card) 85'	Report	Denković (yellow card) 55'; N'Diaye (yellow card) 59'; B.Shadmanov (yellow card) 60'	Stadium: Astana Arena; Attendance: 0 Referee: Denis Izmailov
Note: Match played behind closed doors due to the COVID-19 pandemic in Kazakhstan.

14 August 2021 6	Aktobe	1–1	Astana	Aktobe
18:00 (UTC+6)	Samorodov 15' (yellow card) 19'; Orazov (yellow card) 25'; A.Tanzharikov (yellow card) 25'; Chernyshov (yellow card) 52'	Report	Ciupercă (yellow card) 13'; Tomasov 85'	Stadium: Central Stadium; Attendance: 0 Referee: Sergey Gorokhovodatsky
Note: Match played behind closed doors due to the COVID-19 pandemic in Kazakhstan.

==== Knockout stages ====
21 August 2021 Quarter-final 1st leg	Astana	3–3	Caspiy	Nur-Sultan
19:00 (UTC+6)	Ebong 4'; Kuat (yellow card) 17'; Aymbetov 36'; Tomašević (yellow card) 63' (goal) 84'; Šimunović (yellow card) 80'; Barseghyan (yellow card) 80'; Cadete (yellow card) 90+4'	Report	Darabayev (yellow card) 21' (goal) 90+5'; M.Taykenov 39' (pen.); R.Zhanysbaev 45'; J-A.Payruz (yellow card) 56'; Mingazow (yellow card) 80'	Stadium: Astana Arena; Attendance: 0 Referee: Denis Tevyashov
Note: Match played behind closed doors due to the COVID-19 pandemic in Kazakhstan.

22 September 2021 Quarter-final 2nd leg	Caspiy	0–1 (a.e.t.) (3–4 agg.)	Astana	Aktau
18:00 (UTC+6)	Zaleski (red card) 2'; T.Kusyapov (yellow card) 33'; Taykenov (yellow card) 68'; Gavrić (yellow card) 88'; N.Ayazbaev (yellow card) 120+1'	Report	S.Sagnayev (yellow card) 12'; Skvortsov (yellow card) 36'; Beysebekov (yellow card) 51'; Ebong (yellow card) 62' (yellow-red card) 120'; Ciupercă (yellow card) 90' (yellow-red card) 106'; Kuat (yellow card) 90+4' (goal) 116'; Barseghyan (yellow card) 93'; S.Sovet (yellow card) 100'	Stadium: Zhastar Stadium; Attendance: 1,500; Referee: Saken Bayimbet

7 November 2021 Semi-final 1st leg	Astana	0–3	Kairat	Nur-Sultan
18:00 (UTC+6)	Tomašević (yellow card) 35'; Bećiraj (yellow card) 56'; A.Adilov (yellow card) 90+3'; Prokopenko (yellow card) 90+4'	Report	Dugalić 45+7'; Kanté 67'; Shushenachev 71'; Abiken (yellow card) 85'	Stadium: Astana Arena; Attendance: 3,000; Referee: Alexander Gauser

20 November 2021 Semi-final 2nd leg	Kairat	3–0 (6–0 agg.)	Astana	Almaty
15:00 (UTC+6)	Dugalić (yellow card) 22' (yellow-red card) 58'; M.Kalmyrza 64' (o.g.); Kanté 80'; Vágner Love 86'	Report	S.Sagnayev (yellow card) 39'; Bećiraj (yellow card) 41'; Kuat (yellow card) 56'; M.Kalmyrza (yellow card) 61' (red card) 69'; Bitri (yellow card) 64'	Stadium: Central Stadium; Attendance: 2,000; Referee: Artem Kuchin

=== UEFA Europa Conference League ===
==== Qualifying rounds ====
22 July 2021 Second qualifying round 1st leg	Astana (Kazakhstan)	2–0	(Greece) Aris Thessaloniki	Nur-Sultan, Kazakhstan
19:00 (UTC+6)	Tomasov 24', 70'; Šimunović (yellow card) 27' (yellow-red card) 76'	Report	Benalouane (yellow card) 4'; Bruno (yellow card) 83'; Matilla (yellow card) 86'	Stadium: Astana Arena; Attendance: 0 Referee: Bastian Dankert (Germany)
Note: Match played behind closed doors due to the COVID-19 pandemic in Kazakhstan.

30 July 2021 Second qualifying round 2nd leg	Aris Thessaloniki (Greece)	2–1 (a.e.t.) (2–3 agg.)	(Kazakhstan) Astana	Thessaloniki, Greece
01:30 (UTC+6)	Sundgren (yellow card) 22'; Mancini (yellow card) 32'; Manos 36'; García (yellow card) 68' (yellow-red card) 86'; Sasha 78'; Matilla (yellow card) 90+7'	Report	Barseghyan (yellow card) 37'; Aymbetov (yellow card) 80'; Cadete (yellow card) 90+8'; Gurman (yellow card) 116'; Bitri 120+1'	Stadium: Kleanthis Vikelidis Stadium; Attendance: 10,000; Referee: Michael Fabbri (Italy)

5 August 2021 Third qualifying round 1st leg	KuPS (Finland)	1–1	(Kazakhstan) Astana	Kuopio, Finland
22:00 (UTC+6)	Udoh 54'	Report	Ciupercă (yellow card) 58'; Rukavina (yellow card) 85'; Kuat (yellow card) 85'; Bitri 90+4'	Stadium: Kuopio Football Stadium; Attendance: 1,732; Referee: Adrien Jaccottet (Switzerland)

12 August 2021 Third qualifying round 2nd leg	Astana (Kazakhstan)	3–4 (4–5 agg.)	(Finland) KuPS	Nur-Sultan, Kazakhstan
19:00 (UTC+6)	Barseghyan 4', 58'; Kuat (yellow card) 38'; Aymbetov 41'	Report	D.Carrillo (yellow card) 30'; Rangel 53', 61', 74'; Udo (yellow card) 62'; Ikaunieks 77'; Nissilä (yellow card) 85'	Stadium: Astana Arena; Attendance: 0 Referee: Nikola Dabanović (Montenegro)
Note: Match played behind closed doors due to the COVID-19 pandemic in Kazakhstan.

== Squad statistics ==
As of match played 20 November 2021

=== Appearances and goals ===
No.	Pos	Nat	Player	Total		Premier League		Kazakhstan Cup		Super Cup		UEFA Europa Conference League	
No.	Pos	Nat	Player	Apps	Goals	Apps	Goals	Apps	Goals	Apps	Goals	Apps	Goals
5	DF	(Kazakhstan) KAZ	Mark Gurman	21	0	4+8	0	6+1	0	0	0	0+2	0
7	MF	(Belarus) BLR	Max Ebong	29	6	17+3	5	2+2	1	2	0	3	0
8	MF	(Kazakhstan) KAZ	Islambek Kuat	34	2	16+7	1	6+1	1	0	0	3+1	0
10	MF	(Croatia) CRO	Marin Tomasov	34	22	23	17	5+1	2	2	1	3	2
11	MF	(Armenia) ARM	Tigran Barseghyan	35	12	24	7	3+2	2	2	1	4	2
15	DF	(Kazakhstan) KAZ	Abzal Beisebekov	34	5	22+2	5	4	0	2	0	4	0
17	FW	(Kazakhstan) KAZ	Abat Aymbetov	23	9	11+3	6	6+1	2	0	0	1+1	1
18	DF	(Kazakhstan) KAZ	Sagi Sovet	13	0	3+4	0	4	0	2	0	0	0
19	DF	(Kazakhstan) KAZ	Lev Skvortsov	6	0	0+1	0	5	0	0	0	0	0
20	FW	(Montenegro) MNE	Fatos Bećiraj	18	2	7	2	2+5	0	0	0	1+3	0
21	DF	(Spain) ESP	Cadete	30	0	16+5	0	7	0	0	0	1+1	0
22	GK	(Kazakhstan) KAZ	Dmytro Nepohodov	28	0	19	0	2+1	0	2	0	4	0
24	DF	(Croatia) CRO	Luka Šimunović	37	0	25	0	7	0	2	0	3	0
26	DF	(Albania) ALB	Eneo Bitri	17	2	2+5	0	6	0	0	0	4	2
31	GK	(Kazakhstan) KAZ	Danil Podymksy	1	0	0	0	1	0	0	0	0	0
33	DF	(Montenegro) MNE	Žarko Tomašević	31	3	21	1	4	1	2	1	3+1	0
34	DF	(Kazakhstan) KAZ	Ruslan Pistol	1	0	0	0	1	0	0	0	0	0
52	DF	(Kazakhstan) KAZ	Rakhat Maratov	2	0	0	0	2	0	0	0	0	0
53	FW	(Kazakhstan) KAZ	Andrey Berezutskiy	1	0	0	0	0+1	0	0	0	0	0
55	GK	(Kazakhstan) KAZ	Aleksandr Zarutskiy	16	0	7	0	7	0	0+1	0	0+1	0
57	DF	(Kazakhstan) KAZ	Sanzhar Shurakhanov	3	0	0	0	2+1	0	0	0	0	0
58	MF	(Kazakhstan) KAZ	Azamat Nurzhanuly	2	0	0	0	0+2	0	0	0	0	0
63	DF	(Kazakhstan) KAZ	Dias Kanatkali	1	0	0	0	0+1	0	0	0	0	0
65	MF	(Kazakhstan) KAZ	Meyrambek Kalmyrza	7	0	0	0	3+4	0	0	0	0	0
70	MF	(Kazakhstan) KAZ	Sultan Sagnayev	24	0	0+16	0	5+2	0	0	0	0+1	0
72	FW	(Kazakhstan) KAZ	Stanislav Basmanov	12	0	1+4	0	6+1	0	0	0	0	0
77	MF	(Portugal) POR	Pedro Eugénio	13	0	1+3	0	1+4	0	0	0	3+1	0
80	FW	(Kazakhstan) KAZ	Vladislav Prokopenko	19	0	0+11	0	5+3	0	0	0	0	0
82	DF	(Kazakhstan) KAZ	Aydos Kumarov	1	0	0	0	1	0	0	0	0	0
89	DF	(Kazakhstan) KAZ	Bauyrzhan Akhaev	2	0	0	0	0+2	0	0	0	0	0
91	MF	(Kazakhstan) KAZ	Aldair Adilov	1	0	0	0	0+1	0	0	0	0	0
92	MF	(Moldova) MDA	Valeriu Ciupercă	34	4	21+3	4	2+2	0	0+2	0	3+1	0
94	DF	(Kazakhstan) KAZ	Yuri Akhanov	1	0	0	0	1	0	0	0	0	0
97	FW	(Kazakhstan) KAZ	Adilkhan Sabyr	1	0	0	0	0+1	0	0	0	0	0
Players away from Astana on loan:
99	FW	(Bosnia and Herzegovina) BIH	Semir Smajlagić	13	0	2+9	0	0	0	2	0	0	0
Players who left Astana during the season:
2	DF	(Serbia) SRB	Antonio Rukavina	34	0	25	0	3	0	2	0	4	0
3	DF	(Armenia) ARM	Varazdat Haroyan	15	1	13	1	0	0	2	0	0	0
9	MF	(Romania) ROU	Dorin Rotariu	1	0	0+1	0	0	0	0	0	0	0
45	FW	(Kazakhstan) KAZ	Roman Murtazayev	21	4	6+12	4	1	0	0+2	0	0	0

=== Goal scorers ===
Place	Position	Nation	Number	Name	Premier League	Kazakhstan Cup	Super Cup	UEFA Europa Conference League	Total
1	MF	(Croatia)	10	Marin Tomasov	17	2	1	2	22
2	MF	(Armenia)	11	Tigran Barseghyan	7	2	1	2	12
3	FW	(Kazakhstan)	17	Abat Aymbetov	6	2	0	1	9
4	MF	(Belarus)	7	Max Ebong	5	1	0	0	6
5	DF	(Kazakhstan)	15	Abzal Beisebekov	5	0	0	0	5
6	FW	(Kazakhstan)	45	Roman Murtazayev	4	0	0	0	4
6	MF	(Moldova)	92	Valeriu Ciupercă	4	0	0	0	4
8	DF	(Montenegro)	33	Žarko Tomašević	1	1	1	0	3
9	FW	(Montenegro)	20	Fatos Bećiraj	2	0	0	0	2
9	MF	(Kazakhstan)	8	Islambek Kuat	1	1	0	0	2
9	DF	(Albania)	26	Eneo Bitri	0	0	0	2	2
12	DF	(Armenia)	3	Varazdat Haroyan	1	0	0	0	1
12				Own goal	0	1	0	0	1
				TOTALS	53	10	3	7	73

=== Clean sheets ===
Place	Position	Nation	Number	Name	Premier League	Kazakhstan Cup	Super Cup	UEFA Europa Conference League	Total
1	GK	(Kazakhstan)	22	Dmytro Nepohodov	7	0	1	1	9
2	GK	(Kazakhstan)	55	Aleksandr Zarutskiy	3	4	0	0	7
				TOTALS	10	4	1	1	16

=== Disciplinary record ===
Number	Nation	Position	Name	Premier League		Kazakhstan Cup		Super Cup		UEFA Europa Conference League		Total	
Number	Nation	Position	Name	Booked	Sent off (straight red)	Booked	Sent off (straight red)	Booked	Sent off (straight red)	Booked	Sent off (straight red)	Booked	Sent off (straight red)
5	(Kazakhstan)	DF	Mark Gurman	2	0	2	1	0	0	1	0	5	1
7	(Belarus)	MF	Max Ebong	3	0	4	1	0	0	0	0	7	1
8	(Kazakhstan)	MF	Islambek Kuat	7	0	3	0	0	0	2	0	12	0
10	(Croatia)	MF	Marin Tomasov	5	0	0	0	0	0	0	0	5	0
11	(Armenia)	MF	Tigran Barseghyan	5	0	2	0	1	0	1	0	9	0
15	(Kazakhstan)	DF	Abzal Beisebekov	3	0	3	0	0	0	0	0	6	0
17	(Kazakhstan)	FW	Abat Aymbetov	2	0	0	0	0	0	1	0	3	0
18	(Kazakhstan)	DF	Sagi Sovet	0	0	1	0	1	0	0	0	2	0
19	(Kazakhstan)	DF	Lev Skvortsov	0	0	2	0	0	0	0	0	2	0
20	(Montenegro)	FW	Fatos Bećiraj	0	0	2	0	0	0	0	0	2	0
21	(Spain)	DF	Cadete	1	0	2	0	0	0	1	0	4	0
22	(Kazakhstan)	GK	Dmytro Nepohodov	2	0	0	0	0	0	0	0	2	0
24	(Croatia)	DF	Luka Šimunović	4	0	1	0	1	0	2	1	8	1
26	(Albania)	DF	Eneo Bitri	0	0	1	0	0	0	0	0	1	0
33	(Montenegro)	DF	Žarko Tomašević	2	0	3	0	0	0	0	0	5	0
65	(Kazakhstan)	MF	Meyrambek Kalmyrza	0	0	1	1	0	0	0	0	1	1
70	(Kazakhstan)	MF	Sultan Sagnayev	1	0	4	0	0	0	0	0	5	0
72	(Kazakhstan)	FW	Stanislav Basmanov	1	0	0	0	0	0	0	0	1	0
80	(Kazakhstan)	FW	Vladislav Prokopenko	0	0	1	0	0	0	0	0	1	0
91	(Kazakhstan)	MF	Aldair Adilov	0	0	1	0	0	0	0	0	1	0
92	(Moldova)	MF	Valeriu Ciupercă	6	1	3	1	1	0	1	0	11	2
Players away on loan:
99	(Bosnia and Herzegovina)	FW	Semir Smajlagić	2	0	0	0	1	0	0	0	3	0
Players who left Astana during the season:
2	(Serbia)	DF	Antonio Rukavina	5	0	0	0	0	0	1	0	6	0
3	(Armenia)	DF	Varazdat Haroyan	5	0	0	0	0	0	0	0	5	0
45	(Kazakhstan)	FW	Roman Murtazayev	1	0	0	0	0	0	0	0	1	0
			TOTALS	53	1	36	3	5	0	10	1	104	5
