= 2020 FC Astana season =

FC Astana
2020 season
- Chairman: Sayan Khamitzhanov
- Manager: Roman Hryhorchuk (until 13 January); Michal Bílek (14 January - 26 August); Paul Ashworth (Caretaker) (26 August - 7 October); Andrey Tikhonov (from 16 October)
- Stadium: Astana Arena (Renovation); Zhas Kyran Stadium (Round 1, 2); UTB Talgar Stadium (Round 5); T.S.Segïzbaeva Academy Stadium (Round 7)
- Premier League: 2nd
- Super Cup: Champions
- Kazakhstan Cup: Canceled due to the COVID-19 pandemic
- Champions League: First qualifying round vs Dynamo Brest
- Europa League: Second qualifying round vs Budućnost Podgorica
- Top goalscorer: League: Two Players (6); All: Pieros Sotiriou (7)
| Home colours | Away colours |

The 2020 FC Astana season is the twelfth successive season that Astana will play in the Kazakhstan Premier League, the highest tier of association football in Kazakhstan. Astana are defending Kazakhstan Premier League holders, having won their sixth title the previous season. Astana will also play in the season opening Super Cup against FC Kaisar, the Kazakhstan Cup and enter the Champions League at the First qualifying round.

== Season events ==
On 13 January, Roman Hryhorchuk left Astana by mutual consent. The following day, 14 January, Michal Bílek was announced as the new Head Coach of Astana. On 24 January, Astana announced the signing of Max Ebong on a four-year contract from Shakhtyor Soligorsk, and Tigran Barseghyan to a two your contract from Kaisar.

On 17 February, Rangelo Janga moved to Lugano on loan until 30 June.

On 20 February, Astana announced the signing of Pieros Sotiriou to a three-year contract from Copenhagen.

Due to on going repair work at the Astana Arena, Astana started the season by playing their home games at the Zhas Kyran Stadium in Almaty.

On 13 March, the Football Federation of Kazakhstan announced all league fixtures would be played behind closed doors for the foreseeable future due to the COVID-19 pandemic. On 16 March the Football Federation of Kazakhstan suspended all football until 15 April.

On 30 May, the Professional Football League of Kazakhstan announced that Irtysh Pavlodar had withdrawn from the league due to financial issues, with all their matches being excluded from the league results.

On 26 June, it was announced that the 2020 Kazakhstan Premier League would resume on 1 July.

On 2 July, Serhiy Malyi left Astana after his contract expired.

On 3 July, the Kazakhstan Premier League was suspended for two-weeks due to the COVID-19 pandemic.

On 23 July, Sultan Sagnayev and Ramazan Karimov had their season-long loan deals with Caspiy ended prematurely and they returned to the club.

On 7 August, Sparta Prague announced that defender Uroš Radaković had joined Astana on loan for the remainder of the 2020 season, with Astana holding an option to make the transfer permanent. On 8 August, Astana confirmed the arrival of Radaković.

On 22 August, Rangelo Janga was loaned to NEC Nijmegen for one-year.

On 26 August, Michal Bílek was sacked as manager, with Executive Director Paul Ashworth being placed in temporary charge. Ashworth his role as caretaker manager and executive director by mutual consent on 7 October. On 16 October, former captain Andrey Tikhonov was appointed as the clubs new manager.

== Squad ==
As of match played 30 November 2020

| No. | Name | Nationality | Position | Date of birth (age) | Signed from | Signed in | Contract ends | Apps. | Goals |
Goalkeepers
| 1 | Nenad Erić | (Kazakhstan) | GK | 26 May 1982 (aged 38) | Kairat | 2011 | | 318 | 0 |
| 22 | Dmytro Nepohodov | (Kazakhstan) | GK | 17 February 1988 (aged 32) | Tobol | 2019 | | 6 | 0 |
| 31 | Danil Podymksy | (Kazakhstan) | GK | 13 May 1998 (aged 22) | Academy | 2016 | | 0 | 0 |
| 53 | Stanislav Pavlov | (Kazakhstan) | GK | 30 May 1994 (aged 26) | Tobol | 2018 | | 2 | 0 |
Defenders
| 2 | Antonio Rukavina | (Serbia) | DF | 26 January 1984 (aged 36) | Villarreal | 2018 | 2021 | 71 | 0 |
| 4 | Uroš Radaković | (Serbia) | DF | 31 March 1994 (aged 26) | loan from Sparta Prague | 2020 | 2020 | 14 | 0 |
| 15 | Abzal Beisebekov | (Kazakhstan) | DF | 30 November 1992 (aged 28) | Vostok | 2012 | | 303 | 9 |
| 24 | Luka Šimunović | (Croatia) | DF | 24 May 1997 (aged 23) | Shakhtyor Soligorsk | 2019 | 2021 | 39 | 0 |
| 27 | Yuriy Logvinenko | (Kazakhstan) | DF | 22 July 1988 (aged 32) | Aktobe | 2016 | | 142 | 15 |
| 33 | Žarko Tomašević | (Montenegro) | DF | 22 February 1990 (aged 30) | Oostende | 2019 | | 17 | 3 |
| 44 | Yevgeny Postnikov | (Kazakhstan) | DF | 16 April 1986 (aged 34) | Shakhtyor Soligorsk | 2014 | | 223 | 5 |
| 77 | Dmitri Shomko | (Kazakhstan) | DF | 19 March 1990 (aged 30) | Irtysh Pavlodar | 2014 | | 276 | 12 |
| | Sagi Sovet | (Kazakhstan) | DF | 15 March 2000 (aged 20) | Academy | 2016 | | 1 | 0 |
Midfielders
| 7 | Max Ebong | (Belarus) | MF | 26 August 1999 (aged 21) | Shakhtyor Soligorsk | 2020 | 2023 | 21 | 0 |
| 10 | Rúnar Már Sigurjónsson | (Iceland) | MF | 18 June 1990 (aged 30) | Grasshoppers | 2019 | | 40 | 13 |
| 11 | Tigran Barseghyan | (Armenia) | MF | 22 September 1993 (aged 27) | Kaisar | 2020 | 2021 | 22 | 3 |
| 14 | Marin Tomasov | (Croatia) | MF | 31 August 1987 (aged 33) | Rijeka | 2018 | 2022 | 128 | 53 |
| 18 | Ivan Mayewski | (Belarus) | MF | 5 May 1988 (aged 32) | Anzhi Makhachkala | 2017 | 2020 (+1) | 144 | 8 |
| 28 | Yuriy Pertsukh | (Kazakhstan) | MF | 13 May 1996 (aged 24) | Akzhayik | 2018 | | 54 | 3 |
| 29 | Madi Zhakypbayev | (Kazakhstan) | MF | 21 March 2000 (aged 20) | Academy | 2016 | | 11 | 0 |
| 70 | Sultan Sagnayev | (Kazakhstan) | MF | 14 January 2000 (aged 20) | Academy | 2016 | | 11 | 0 |
| 73 | Didar Zhalmukan | (Kazakhstan) | MF | 22 May 1996 (aged 24) | Aktobe | 2017 | | 41 | 7 |
Forwards
| 9 | Dorin Rotariu | (Romania) | FW | 29 July 1995 (aged 25) | Club Brugge | 2019 | 2022 | 63 | 10 |
| 20 | Pieros Sotiriou | (Cyprus) | FW | 13 January 1993 (aged 27) | Copenhagen | 2020 | 2022 | 18 | 7 |
| 72 | Stanislav Basmanov | (Kazakhstan) | FW | 24 June 2001 (aged 19) | Academy | 2020 | | 2 | 0 |
| 81 | Ramazan Karimov | (Kazakhstan) | FW | 5 July 1999 (aged 21) | Academy | 2018 | | 6 | 1 |
| 99 | Aleksey Shchotkin | (Kazakhstan) | FW | 21 May 1991 (aged 29) | Taraz | 2015 | | 101 | 18 |
Players away on loan
| 32 | Rangelo Janga | (Curaçao) | FW | 16 April 1992 (aged 28) | KAA Gent | 2018 | | 64 | 11 |
| 42 | Lev Skvortsov | (Kazakhstan) | DF | 2 February 2000 (aged 20) | Academy | 2018 | | 3 | 0 |
| 55 | Talgat Kusyapov | (Kazakhstan) | DF | 14 February 1999 (aged 21) | Academy | 2016 | | 2 | 0 |
| 76 | Dinmukhamed Kashken | (Kazakhstan) | DF | 4 January 2000 (aged 20) | Academy | 2019 | | 0 | 0 |
| 80 | Vladislav Prokopenko | (Kazakhstan) | FW | 1 July 2000 (aged 20) | Academy | 2016 | | 13 | 1 |
| 87 | Zhaslan Kairkenov | (Kazakhstan) | MF | 27 March 2000 (aged 20) | Academy | 2016 | | 2 | 0 |
Left during the season
| 19 | Ndombe Mubele | (Democratic Republic of the Congo) | FW | 17 April 1994 (aged 26) | loan from Toulouse | 2019 | 2020 | 12 | 1 |
| 25 | Serhiy Malyi | (Kazakhstan) | DF | 5 June 1990 (aged 30) | Irtysh Pavlodar | 2016 | | 47 | 3 |

=== On loan ===
Note: Flags indicate national team as defined under FIFA eligibility rules; some limited exceptions apply. Players may hold more than one non-FIFA nationality.

| No. | Pos. | Nation | Player |
|---|---|---|---|
| 32 | FW | CUW | Rangelo Janga (at NEC Nijmegen until 30 June 2021) |
| 42 | DF | KAZ | Lev Skvortsov (at Atyrau until end of season) |
| 55 | DF | KAZ | Talgat Kusyapov (at Okzhetpes until end of season) |

| No. | Pos. | Nation | Player |
|---|---|---|---|
| 76 | DF | KAZ | Dinmukhamed Kashken (at Kaisar until end of season) |
| 80 | FW | KAZ | Vladislav Prokopenko (at Aktobe until end of season) |
| 87 | MF | KAZ | Zhaslan Kairkenov (at Atyrau until end of season) |

== Transfers ==
=== In ===
| Date | Position | Nationality | Name | From | Fee | Ref. |
|---|---|---|---|---|---|---|
| 24 January 2020 | MF | (Armenia) | Tigran Barseghyan | Kaisar | Undisclosed | |
| 24 January 2020 | MF | (Belarus) | Max Ebong | Shakhtyor Soligorsk | Undisclosed | |
| 20 February 2020 | FW | (Cyprus) | Pieros Sotiriou | Copenhagen | Undisclosed | |

=== Loans in ===
| Date from | Position | Nationality | Name | From | Date to | Ref. |
|---|---|---|---|---|---|---|
| 2 July 2019 | FW | (Democratic Republic of the Congo) | Ndombe Mubele | Toulouse | 29 June 2020 | |
| 7 August 2020 | DF | (Serbia) | Uroš Radaković | Sparta Prague | 31 December 2020 | |

=== Out ===
| Date | Position | Nationality | Name | To | Fee | Ref. |
|---|---|---|---|---|---|---|
| 1 February 2020 | DF | (Kazakhstan) | Talgat Kusyapov | Okzhetpes | Undisclosed | |
| 25 February 2020 | DF | (Kazakhstan) | Marat Bystrov | Ordabasy | Undisclosed | |

=== Loans out ===
| Date from | Position | Nationality | Name | To | Date to | Ref. |
|---|---|---|---|---|---|---|
| Winter 2020 | MF | (Kazakhstan) | Sultan Sagnayev | Caspiy | 23 July 2020 | |
| Winter 2020 | FW | (Kazakhstan) | Ramazan Karimov | Caspiy | 23 July 2020 | |
| Winter 2020 | FW | (Kazakhstan) | Vladislav Prokopenko | Aktobe | End of Season | |
| 17 February 2020 | FW | (Curaçao) | Rangelo Janga | Lugano | 30 June 2020 | |
| 2 March 2020 | MF | (Kazakhstan) | Zhaslan Kairkenov | Atyrau | End of Season | |
| 2 March 2020 | MF | (Kazakhstan) | Lev Skvortsov | Atyrau | End of Season | |
| 22 August 2020 | FW | (Curaçao) | Rangelo Janga | NEC Nijmegen | 30 June 2021 | |
| 9 August 2020 | DF | (Kazakhstan) | Dinmukhamed Kashken | Kaisar | End of Season | |

=== Released ===
| Date | Position | Nationality | Name | Joined | Date | Ref. |
|---|---|---|---|---|---|---|
| 6 January 2020 | GK | (Kazakhstan) | Aleksandr Mokin | Tobol | 22 February 2020 | |
| 6 January 2020 | MF | (Kazakhstan) | Serikzhan Muzhikov | Tobol | 22 January 2020 | |
| 6 January 2020 | FW | (Kazakhstan) | Sergei Khizhnichenko | Ordabasy | 11 February 2020 | |
| 2 July 2020 | DF | (Kazakhstan) | Serhiy Malyi | Tobol | 8 July 2020 | |
| 29 December 2020 | MF | (Belarus) | Ivan Mayewski | Rotor Volgograd | 1 January 2021 | |
| 31 December 2020 | GK | (Kazakhstan) | Vladislav Sayenko | Kyzylzhar | 9 March 2021 | |
| 31 December 2020 | GK | (Kazakhstan) | Stanislav Pavlov | Turan | 5 February 2021 | |

== Friendlies ==
| 25 January 2020 | Brentford B (England) | 2 – 4 | (Kazakhstan) Astana | Portugal |
| (UTC+6) | Goal | Report | Karimov; Rotariu; Shchotkin; Barseghyan |

| 1 February 2020 Atlantic Cup | København (Denmark) | 1 – 0 | (Kazakhstan) Astana | São João da Venda, Portugal |
| 02:00 (UTC+6) | Santos 3' | Report | | Stadium: Estádio Algarve; Referee: Carlos Cabral |

| 4 February 2020 Atlantic Cup | Astana (Kazakhstan) | 2 – 1 | (Denmark) Brøndby | Albufeira, Portugal |
| 02:00 (UTC+6) | Tomasov 29', 56' | Report | Uhre 45' | Stadium: Estádio Municipal de Albufeira; Referee: Bruno Vieira |

| 8 February 2020 Atlantic Cup | Astana (Kazakhstan) | 1 – 2 | (Sweden) BK Häcken | Albufeira, Portugal |
| 21:00 (UTC+6) | Tomasov 78'; Mayewski (yellow card) 39' (yellow-red card) 44' | Report | Bengtsson 38'; Tuominen 66'; (yellow card) 85' | Stadium: Estádio Municipal de Albufeira; Referee: Carlos Cabral |

| 20 February 2020 | Sochi (Russia) | 3 – 1 | (Kazakhstan) Astana | Belek, Turkey |
| 20:00 (UTC+6) | Mostovoy 23', 86'; Burmistrov 36' | Report | Sigurjónsson 64' |

| 23 February 2020 | Arsenal Tula (Russia) | 1 – 1 | (Kazakhstan) Astana | Belek, Turkey |
| 20:00 (UTC+6) | 28' | Report | Sigurjónsson 7'; (red card) 68' |

== Competitions ==
=== Super Cup ===
| 29 February 2020 | Astana | 1 – 0 | Kaisar | Kostanay |
| 17:00 (UTC+6) | Shomko (yellow card) 10'; Postnikov (yellow card) 37'; Sotiriou 40' (yellow card) 53' | Report | Graf (yellow card) 13'; Bitang (yellow card) 29' | Stadium: Tobol Arena; Attendance: 2,900; Referee: Anatolyi Vishnichenko |

=== Premier League ===
==== Results summary ====
| Overall | | | | | | | | Home | | | | | | Away | | | | | |
| Pld | W | D | L | GF | GA | GD | Pts | W | D | L | GF | GA | GD | W | D | L | GF | GA | GD |
|---|---|---|---|---|---|---|---|---|---|---|---|---|---|---|---|---|---|---|---|
| 20 | 11 | 3 | 6 | 32 | 21 | +11 | 36 | 5 | 3 | 2 | 17 | 7 | +10 | 6 | 0 | 4 | 15 | 14 | +1 |

Last updated: 30 November 2020.
Source: See Results

==== Results by round ====
| Round | 1 | 2 | 3 | 4 | 5 | 6 | 7 | 8 | 9 | 10 | 11 | 12 | 13 | 14 | 15 | 16 | 17 | 18 | 19 | 20 | 21 | 22 |
|---|---|---|---|---|---|---|---|---|---|---|---|---|---|---|---|---|---|---|---|---|---|---|
| Ground | H | H | A | - | H | A | H | A | H | A | H | H | - | A | H | A | H | A | A | H | A | A |
| Result | W | D | W | - | W | L | D | W | D | W | W | D | - | L | W | W | L | L | L | W | W | W |
| Position | 1 | 1 | 2 | - | 2 | 2 | 3 | 2 | 2 | 2 | 2 | 2 | - | 2 | 2 | 2 | 2 | 3 | 3 | 3 | 3 | 3 |

Source: See Results
A = Away; H = Home; W = Win; D = Draw; L = Loss

==== Results ====
| 7 March 2020 1 | Astana | 4 – 0 | Kyzylzhar | Almaty |
| 14:00 (UTC+6) | Sotiriou 51', 82'; Sigurjónsson 88'; Tomasov 90' | Report | B.Shaikhov (yellow card) 36'; Markelov (yellow card) 63'; V.Gunchenko (yellow card) 90' | Stadium: Zhas Kyran Stadium; Attendance: 500; Referee: Bakhyt Kyzylbaev |
Note: Match played at the Zhas Kyran Stadium in Almaty, due to repair work being carried out at the Astana Arena in Nur-Sultan.

| 11 March 2020 18 | Astana | 1 – 1 | Ordabasy | Almaty |
| 14:00 (UTC+6) | Malyi (yellow card) 49'; Rukavina (yellow card) 59'; Shchotkin 84' | Report | Khizhnichenko 38'; Bystrov (yellow card) 61'; Simčević (yellow card) 90+6' | Stadium: Zhas Kyran Stadium; Attendance: 1,200; Referee: Grigory Moskovchenko |
Note: Match played at the Zhas Kyran Stadium in Almaty, due to repair work being carried out at the Astana Arena in Nur-Sultan.

| 15 March 2020 2 | Caspiy | 2 – 3 | Astana | Aktau |
| 17:00 (UTC+6) | A.Tattybaev (yellow card) 30'; B.Kovačević (yellow card) 52'; Sirotov (yellow card) 55'; Shakhmetov (yellow card) 55'; Stanisavljević 63'; A.Nabikhanov (yellow card) 67'; Bondarenko 90+2' | Report | Sigurjónsson 16'; Barseghyan 18'; Logvinenko 41'; Malyi (yellow card) 74'; Sotiriou (yellow card) 84' | Stadium: Zhastar Stadium; Attendance: 0 Referee: Furkhat Atazhanov |
Note: Match played behind closed doors due to the COVID-19 pandemic.

| 20 March 2020 3 | Astana | – | Irtysh Pavlodar | Almaty |
| (UTC+6) | | | | Stadium: Zhas Kyran Stadium |
Note: Match originally scheduled for 20 March, but postponed on 16 March due to the COVID-19 pandemic. Match result cancelled on 30 May.

| 22 August 2020 5 | Astana | 2 – 0 | Okzhetpes | Talgar |
| 16:00 (UTC+6) | Sigurjónsson 45+3' (pen.); Zhalmukan 81'; Zhakypbayev (yellow card) 90+2' | Report | Obradović (yellow card) 43'; R.Abzhanov (yellow card) 45+2'; Dimov (yellow card) 48'; T.Zhakupov (yellow card) 63'; D.Shmidt (yellow card) 74' | Stadium: UTB Talgar Stadium; Attendance: 0 Referee: Aydin Rakhimbayev |
Note: Match originally scheduled for 11 April and then 11 July, but postponed twice due to the COVID-19 pandemic. Match played at the UTB Talgar stadium in Talgar, instead of Astana's regular Astana Arena in Nur-Sultan. Match played behind closed doors due to the COVID-19 pandemic.

| 25 August 2020 4 | Tobol | 2 – 0 | Astana | Talgar |
| 18:00 (UTC+6) | Nurgaliev 31'; Kankava (yellow card) 37'; Muzhikov 57' (yellow card) 57' | Report | Mayewski (yellow card) 43'; Shomko (yellow card) 86' | Stadium: UTB Talgar; Attendance: 0 Referee: Denis Izmailov |
Note: Match originally scheduled for 3 April and then 4 July, but postponed twice due to the COVID-19 pandemic. Match played at the UTB Talgar stadium in Talgar, instead of Tobol's regular Central Stadium in Kostanay. Match played behind closed doors due to the COVID-19 pandemic.

| 30 August 2020 7 | Astana | 1 – 1 | Taraz | Almaty |
| 18:00 (UTC+6) | Rotariu 4'; Barseghyan (yellow card) 40'; Postnikov (yellow card) 72' | Report | Verbickas (yellow card) 10'; Boljević (yellow card) 27'; Silva 48' | Stadium: T.S.Segïzbaeva Academy Stadium; Attendance: 0 Referee: Sergey Gorokhovodatskiy |
Note: Match played at the T.S.Segïzbaeva Academy Stadium in Almaty, instead of Astana's regular Astana Arena in Nur-Sultan. Match played behind closed doors due to the COVID-19 pandemic.

| 12 September 2020 8 | Ordabasy | 1 – 2 | Astana | Talgar |
| 15:00 (UTC+6) | João Paulo (yellow card) 21' (goal) 70'; Fontanello (yellow card) 36'; Dosmagambetov (yellow card) 78' | Report | Sigurjónsson 57' (pen.), 64' (pen.); Logvinenko (yellow card) 90+2' | Stadium: UTB Talgar Stadium; Attendance: 0 Referee: Anatolyi Vishnichenko |
Note: Match played at the UTB Talgar Stadium in Talgar, instead of Ordabasy's regular Kazhymukan Munaitpasov Stadium in Shymkent. Match played behind closed doors due to the COVID-19 pandemic.

| 20 September 2020 9 | Astana | 1 – 1 | Shakhter Karagandy | Almaty |
| 15:00 (UTC+6) | Sotiriou 63' | Report | Usman (yellow card) 49'; A.Tattybaev 71' | Stadium: T.S.Segïzbaeva Academy Stadium; Attendance: 0 Referee: Igor Chesnokov |
Note: Match played at the T.S.Segïzbaeva Academy Stadium in Almaty, instead of Astana's regular Astana Arena in Nur-Sultan. Match played behind closed doors due to the COVID-19 pandemic.

| 24 September 2020 10 | Kaisar | 0 – 1 | Astana | Almaty |
| 18:00 (UTC+6) | Bitang (yellow card) 23'; Kolev (yellow card) 30'; Fortes (yellow card) 63'; Gorman (yellow card) 78'; Stanisavljević (yellow card) 90' | Report | Tomašević 87'; Logvinenko (yellow card) 90+3' | Stadium: Central Stadium; Attendance: 0 Referee: Bagdat Abdullaev |
Note: Match played at the Central Stadium in Almaty, instead of Kaisar's regular Gani Muratbayev Stadium in Kyzylorda. Match played behind closed doors due to the COVID-19 pandemic.

| 27 September 2020 11 | Astana | 3 – 0 | Zhetysu | Almaty |
| 18:15 (UTC+6) | Ebong (yellow card) 29'; Tomašević 39', 65'; Sigurjónsson (yellow card) 68'; Beisebekov 78'; Shchotkin (yellow card) 82' | Report | Mawutor (yellow card) 62'; Zhaksylykov (yellow card) 76' | Stadium: Central Stadium; Attendance: 0 Referee: Bakhyt Kyzylbaev |
Note: Match played at the Central Stadium in Almaty, instead of Astana's regular Astana Arena in Nur-Sultan. Match played behind closed doors due to the COVID-19 pandemic.

| 1 October 2020 12 | Astana | 1 – 2 | Caspiy | Talgar |
| 15:45 (UTC+6) | Sotiriou (yellow card) 7'; Sigurjónsson 37'; Postnikov (yellow card) 76' | Report | M.Gabyshev (yellow card) 26'; Adams (yellow card) 37'; Sebaihi 71'; Marusych 75'; Milošević (yellow card) 90+3' | Stadium: UTB Talgar Stadium; Attendance: 0 Referee: Denis Izmailov |
Note: Match played at the UTB Talgar Stadium in Talgar, instead of Astana's regular Astana Arena in Nur-Sultan. Match played behind closed doors due to the COVID-19 pandemic.

| 4 October 2020 6 | Kairat | 3 – 0 | Astana | Almaty |
| 20:30 (UTC+6) | Alykulov 24' (yellow card) 55'; Abiken 47' (yellow card) 52'; Radaković 49' (o.g.) | Report | Barseghyan (yellow card) 29'; Beisebekov (yellow card) 70'; Sigurjónsson (yellow card) 78'; Postnikov (yellow card) 85'; Shomko (yellow card) 88' | Stadium: Central Stadium; Attendance: 0 Referee: Artyom Kuchin |
Note: Match played behind closed doors due to the COVID-19 pandemic.

| 22 October 2020 14 | Astana | 1 – 0 | Tobol | Almaty |
| 17:00 (UTC+6) | Postnikov (yellow card) 45'; Shchotkin 66'; Sotiriou (yellow card) 90' | Report | Valiullin (yellow card) 41'; Hovhannisyan (yellow card) 60'; Malyi (yellow card) 85' | Stadium: Jas Qyran Stadium; Attendance: 0 Referee: Denis Tevyashov |
Note: Match played at the Jas Qyran Stadium in Almaty, instead of Astana's regular Astana Arena in Nur-Sultan. Match played behind closed doors due to the COVID-19 pandemic.

| 26 October 2020 15 | Okzhetpes | 1 – 5 | Astana | Almaty |
| 20:30 (UTC+6) | Moldakaraev (yellow card) 34'; Dmitrijev 55'; Hawrylovich (yellow card) 78' | Report | Logvinenko (yellow card) 4'; Barseghyan 10', 28' (yellow card) 34'; Tomasov 40'; Shchotkin 50', 86'; Beisebekov (yellow card) 54' | Stadium: Central Stadium; Attendance: 0 Referee: Bolat Saryev |
Note: Match played at the Central Stadium in Almaty, instead of Okzhetpes's regular Okzhetpes Stadium in Kokshetau. Match played behind closed doors due to the COVID-19 pandemic.

| 30 October 2020 16 | Astana | 0 – 1 | Kairat | Almaty |
| 17:00 (UTC+6) | Ebong (yellow card) 4'; Barseghyan (yellow card) 6'; Tomasov (yellow card) 38' | Report | Aimbetov 31'; Eseola (yellow card) 84' | Stadium: Jas Qyran Stadium; Attendance: 0 Referee: Igor Chesnokov |
Note: Match played at the Jas Qyran Stadium in Almaty, instead of Astana's regular Astana Arena in Nur-Sultan. Match played behind closed doors due to the COVID-19 pandemic.

| 4 November 2020 17 | Taraz | 1 – 0 | Astana | Almaty |
| 17:00 (UTC+6) | Nyuiadzi 32' (yellow card) 65'; Turysbek (yellow card) 87' | Report | | Stadium: Jas Qyran Stadium; Attendance: 0 Referee: Igor Chesnokov |
Note: Match played at the Jas Qyran Stadium in Almaty, instead of Taraz's regular Central Stadium in Taraz. Match played behind closed doors due to the COVID-19 pandemic.

| 21 November 2020 19 | Shakhter Karagandy | 3 – 1 | Astana | Almaty |
| 13:00 (UTC+6) | Mingazow 6' (yellow card) 18'; Zenjov 24'; Usman (yellow card) 43' (yellow-red card) 87'; E.Tapalov 79' | Report | Shomko (yellow card) 22'; Ebong (yellow card) 62'; Barseghyan (yellow card) 78'; Zhalmukan 90' | Stadium: Jas Qyran Stadium; Attendance: 0 Referee: Daniyar Sakhi |
Note: Match played at the Jas Qyran Stadium in Almaty, instead of Shakhter Karagandy's regular Shakhter Stadium in Karaganda. Match played behind closed doors due to the COVID-19 pandemic.

| 24 November 2020 20 | Astana | 3 – 1 | Kaisar | Almaty |
| 13:00 (UTC+6) | Tomasov 25'; Beisebekov (yellow card) 41'; Logvinenko (yellow card) 49'; Sotiriou 61', 73' (pen.) | Report | Fedin 30' (yellow card) 31'; D.Kashken (yellow card) 57' | Stadium: Jas Qyran Stadium; Attendance: 0 Referee: Saken Bayimbet |
Note: Match played at the Jas Qyran Stadium in Almaty, instead of Astana's regular Astana Arena in Nur-Sultan. Match played behind closed doors due to the COVID-19 pandemic.

| 27 November 2020 21 | Zhetysu | 1 – 2 | Astana | Almaty |
| 13:00 (UTC+6) | Zaleski 4'; Eugénio (yellow card) 61'; Pobudey (yellow card) 69' | Report | Tomasov 61'; Sotiriou 81' | Stadium: Jas Qyran Stadium; Attendance: 0 Referee: Aleksandr Gauzer |
Note: Match played at the Jas Qyran Stadium in Almaty, instead of Zhetysu's regular Zhetysu Stadium in Taldıqorğan. Match played behind closed doors due to the COVID-19 pandemic.

| 30 November 2020 22 | Kyzylzhar | 0 – 1 | Astana | Almaty |
| 13:00 (UTC+6) | I.Aitov (yellow card) 53'; A.Kasym (yellow card) 64' | Report | Mayewski 45+2'; Ebong (yellow card) 59'; Radaković (yellow card) 72' | Stadium: T.S.Segïzbaeva Academy Stadium; Attendance: 0 Referee: Igor Chesnokov |
Note: Match played at the T.S.Segïzbaeva Academy Stadium in Almaty, instead of Kyzylzhar's regular Karasai Stadium in Petropavl. Match played behind closed doors due to the COVID-19 pandemic.

==== League table ====
| Pos | Team | Pld | W | D | L | GF | GA | GD | Pts | Qualification or relegation |
|---|---|---|---|---|---|---|---|---|---|---|
| 1 | Kairat (C) | 20 | 14 | 3 | 3 | 48 | 19 | +29 | 45 | Qualification for the Champions League first qualifying round |
| 2 | Tobol | 20 | 12 | 2 | 6 | 26 | 16 | +10 | 38 | Qualification for the Europa Conference League second qualifying round |
| 3 | Astana | 20 | 11 | 3 | 6 | 32 | 21 | +11 | 36 | Qualification for the Europa Conference League second qualifying round |
| 4 | Shakhter Karagandy | 20 | 9 | 5 | 6 | 29 | 22 | +7 | 32 | Qualification for the Europa Conference League second qualifying round |
| 5 | Ordabasy | 20 | 9 | 4 | 7 | 27 | 26 | +1 | 31 | |

Source: UEFA, Soccerway
Rules for classification: 1) Points; 2) Goal difference; 3) Matches won; 4) Goals scored; 5) Away goals scored; 6) Head-to-head points; 7) Head-to-head matches won; 8) Head-to-head goal difference; 9) Head-to-head goals scored; 10) Head-to-head away goals scored; 11) Draw.
(C) Champions

=== Kazakhstan Cup ===
| July 2020 Last 16 | Cancelled |
| (UTC+6) |

=== UEFA Champions League ===
==== Qualifying rounds ====
| 19 August 2020 First qualifying round | Dynamo Brest (Belarus) | 6 – 3 | (Kazakhstan) Astana | Brest, Belarus |
| 00:00 (UTC+6) | Gordeichuk 16', 22'; Pyachenin 17'; Kiki (yellow card) 35'; Sedko 37'; Diallo 55', 90' | Report | Tomasov 45'; Rotariu 53'; Beisebekov 87' | Stadium: OSK Brestsky; Attendance: 0 Referee: Tomasz Musiał (Poland) |
Note: Match played behind closed doors due to the COVID-19 pandemic in Europe.

=== UEFA Europa League ===
==== Qualifying rounds ====
| 17 September 2020 Second qualifying round | Astana (Kazakhstan) | 0 – 1 | (Montenegro) Budućnost Podgorica | Almaty, Kazakhstan |
| 20:00 (UTC+6) | Barseghyan (yellow card) 2'; Sotiriou (yellow card) 60'; Radaković (yellow card) 73'; Šimunović (yellow card) 77'; Postnikov (yellow card) 89' | Report | Terzić 25'; Dragojević (yellow card) 68'; Moraitis (yellow card) 75'; Mirković (yellow card) 83' | Stadium: Central Stadium; Attendance: 0 Referee: Dumitri Muntean (Moldova) |
Note: Match played at the Central Stadium in Almaty, instead of Astana's regular Astana Arena in Nur-Sultan. Match played behind closed doors due to the COVID-19 pandemic in Europe.

== Squad statistics ==
As of match played 30 November 2020

=== Appearances and goals ===
| No. | Pos | Nat | Player | Total | | Premier League | | Kazakhstan Cup | | Super Cup | | Champions League | | Europa League | |
| No. | Pos | Nat | Player | Apps | Goals | Apps | Goals | Apps | Goals | Apps | Goals | Apps | Goals | Apps | Goals |
|---|---|---|---|---|---|---|---|---|---|---|---|---|---|---|---|
| 1 | GK | (Kazakhstan) KAZ | Nenad Erić | 17 | 0 | 15 | 0 | 0 | 0 | 1 | 0 | 0 | 0 | 1 | 0 |
| 2 | DF | (Serbia) SRB | Antonio Rukavina | 11 | 0 | 10+1 | 0 | 0 | 0 | 0 | 0 | 0 | 0 | 0 | 0 |
| 4 | DF | (Serbia) SRB | Uroš Radaković | 14 | 0 | 12 | 0 | 0 | 0 | 0 | 0 | 1 | 0 | 1 | 0 |
| 7 | MF | (Belarus) BLR | Max Ebong | 21 | 0 | 18 | 0 | 0 | 0 | 1 | 0 | 1 | 0 | 1 | 0 |
| 9 | FW | (Romania) ROU | Dorin Rotariu | 16 | 2 | 6+7 | 1 | 0 | 0 | 0+1 | 0 | 0+1 | 1 | 1 | 0 |
| 10 | MF | (Iceland) ISL | Rúnar Már Sigurjónsson | 17 | 6 | 12+3 | 6 | 0 | 0 | 1 | 0 | 0 | 0 | 1 | 0 |
| 11 | MF | (Armenia) ARM | Tigran Barseghyan | 22 | 3 | 17+2 | 3 | 0 | 0 | 1 | 0 | 0+1 | 0 | 1 | 0 |
| 14 | MF | (Croatia) CRO | Marin Tomasov | 20 | 5 | 17 | 4 | 0 | 0 | 1 | 0 | 1 | 1 | 0+1 | 0 |
| 15 | DF | (Kazakhstan) KAZ | Abzal Beisebekov | 20 | 2 | 15+2 | 1 | 0 | 0 | 1 | 0 | 1 | 1 | 0+1 | 0 |
| 18 | MF | (Belarus) BLR | Ivan Mayewski | 18 | 1 | 14+1 | 1 | 0 | 0 | 1 | 0 | 1 | 0 | 1 | 0 |
| 20 | FW | (Cyprus) CYP | Pieros Sotiriou | 18 | 7 | 11+4 | 6 | 0 | 0 | 1 | 1 | 1 | 0 | 1 | 0 |
| 22 | GK | (Kazakhstan) KAZ | Dmytro Nepohodov | 6 | 0 | 5 | 0 | 0 | 0 | 0 | 0 | 1 | 0 | 0 | 0 |
| 24 | DF | (Croatia) CRO | Luka Šimunović | 10 | 0 | 7+1 | 0 | 0 | 0 | 0 | 0 | 1 | 0 | 1 | 0 |
| 27 | DF | (Kazakhstan) KAZ | Yuriy Logvinenko | 15 | 1 | 8+6 | 1 | 0 | 0 | 0+1 | 0 | 0 | 0 | 0 | 0 |
| 28 | MF | (Kazakhstan) KAZ | Yuriy Pertsukh | 10 | 0 | 5+4 | 0 | 0 | 0 | 0 | 0 | 1 | 0 | 0 | 0 |
| 29 | MF | (Kazakhstan) KAZ | Madi Zhakypbayev | 4 | 0 | 0+4 | 0 | 0 | 0 | 0 | 0 | 0 | 0 | 0 | 0 |
| 33 | DF | (Montenegro) MNE | Žarko Tomašević | 11 | 3 | 10+1 | 3 | 0 | 0 | 0 | 0 | 0 | 0 | 0 | 0 |
| 44 | DF | (Kazakhstan) KAZ | Yevgeny Postnikov | 15 | 0 | 11+2 | 0 | 0 | 0 | 1 | 0 | 0 | 0 | 1 | 0 |
| 70 | MF | (Kazakhstan) KAZ | Sultan Sagnayev | 2 | 0 | 0+2 | 0 | 0 | 0 | 0 | 0 | 0 | 0 | 0 | 0 |
| 72 | FW | (Kazakhstan) KAZ | Stanislav Basmanov | 1 | 0 | 0+1 | 0 | 0 | 0 | 0 | 0 | 0 | 0 | 0 | 0 |
| 73 | MF | (Kazakhstan) KAZ | Didar Zhalmukan | 13 | 2 | 1+12 | 2 | 0 | 0 | 0 | 0 | 0 | 0 | 0 | 0 |
| 77 | DF | (Kazakhstan) KAZ | Dmitri Shomko | 19 | 0 | 16 | 0 | 0 | 0 | 1 | 0 | 1 | 0 | 1 | 0 |
| 81 | FW | (Kazakhstan) KAZ | Ramazan Karimov | 3 | 0 | 0+3 | 0 | 0 | 0 | 0 | 0 | 0 | 0 | 0 | 0 |
| 99 | FW | (Kazakhstan) KAZ | Aleksey Shchotkin | 18 | 4 | 7+8 | 4 | 0 | 0 | 0+1 | 0 | 1 | 0 | 0+1 | 0 |
Players away from Astana on loan:
Players who left Astana during the season:
| 25 | DF | (Kazakhstan) KAZ | Serhiy Malyi | 4 | 0 | 3 | 0 | 0 | 0 | 1 | 0 | 0 | 0 | 0 | 0 |

=== Goal scorers ===
| Place | Position | Nation | Number | Name | Premier League | Kazakhstan Cup | Super Cup | Champions League | Europa League | Total |
|---|---|---|---|---|---|---|---|---|---|---|
| 1 | FW | (Cyprus) | 20 | Pieros Sotiriou | 6 | 0 | 1 | 0 | 0 | 7 |
| 2 | MF | (Iceland) | 10 | Rúnar Már Sigurjónsson | 6 | 0 | 0 | 0 | 0 | 6 |
| 3 | MF | (Croatia) | 14 | Marin Tomasov | 4 | 0 | 0 | 1 | 0 | 5 |
| 4 | FW | (Kazakhstan) | 99 | Aleksey Shchotkin | 4 | 0 | 0 | 0 | 0 | 4 |
| 5 | DF | (Montenegro) | 33 | Žarko Tomašević | 3 | 0 | 0 | 0 | 0 | 3 |
| 5 | MF | (Armenia) | 11 | Tigran Barseghyan | 3 | 0 | 0 | 0 | 0 | 3 |
| 7 | MF | (Kazakhstan) | 73 | Didar Zhalmukan | 2 | 0 | 0 | 0 | 0 | 2 |
| 7 | FW | (Romania) | 9 | Dorin Rotariu | 1 | 0 | 0 | 1 | 0 | 2 |
| 7 | DF | (Kazakhstan) | 15 | Abzal Beisebekov | 1 | 0 | 0 | 1 | 0 | 2 |
| 10 | DF | (Kazakhstan) | 27 | Yuriy Logvinenko | 1 | 0 | 0 | 0 | 0 | 1 |
| 10 | MF | (Belarus) | 18 | Ivan Mayewski | 1 | 0 | 0 | 0 | 0 | 1 |
| | | | | TOTALS | 32 | 0 | 1 | 3 | 0 | 36 |

=== Clean sheets ===
| Place | Position | Nation | Number | Name | Premier League | Kazakhstan Cup | Super Cup | Champions League | Europa League | Total |
|---|---|---|---|---|---|---|---|---|---|---|
| 1 | GK | (Kazakhstan) | 1 | Nenad Erić | 3 | 0 | 1 | 0 | 0 | 4 |
| 2 | GK | (Kazakhstan) | 22 | Dmytro Nepohodov | 3 | 0 | 0 | 0 | 0 | 3 |
| | | | | TOTALS | 6 | 0 | 1 | 0 | 0 | 7 |

=== Disciplinary record ===
| Number | Nation | Position | Name | Premier League | | Kazakhstan Cup | | Super Cup | | Champions League | | Europa League | | Total | |
| Number | Nation | Position | Name | Yellow card | Red card | Yellow card | Red card | Yellow card | Red card | Yellow card | Red card | Yellow card | Red card | Yellow card | Red card |
| 2 | (Serbia) | DF | Antonio Rukavina | 1 | 0 | 0 | 0 | 0 | 0 | 0 | 0 | 0 | 0 | 1 | 0 |
| 4 | (Serbia) | DF | Uroš Radaković | 1 | 0 | 0 | 0 | 0 | 0 | 0 | 0 | 1 | 0 | 2 | 0 |
| 7 | (Belarus) | MF | Max Ebong | 4 | 0 | 0 | 0 | 0 | 0 | 0 | 0 | 0 | 0 | 4 | 0 |
| 10 | (Iceland) | MF | Rúnar Már Sigurjónsson | 2 | 0 | 0 | 0 | 0 | 0 | 0 | 0 | 0 | 0 | 2 | 0 |
| 11 | (Armenia) | MF | Tigran Barseghyan | 5 | 0 | 0 | 0 | 0 | 0 | 0 | 0 | 1 | 0 | 6 | 0 |
| 14 | (Croatia) | MF | Marin Tomasov | 1 | 0 | 0 | 0 | 0 | 0 | 0 | 0 | 0 | 0 | 1 | 0 |
| 15 | (Kazakhstan) | DF | Abzal Beisebekov | 3 | 0 | 0 | 0 | 0 | 0 | 0 | 0 | 0 | 0 | 3 | 0 |
| 18 | (Belarus) | MF | Ivan Mayewski | 1 | 0 | 0 | 0 | 0 | 0 | 0 | 0 | 0 | 0 | 1 | 0 |
| 20 | (Cyprus) | FW | Pieros Sotiriou | 3 | 0 | 0 | 0 | 1 | 0 | 0 | 0 | 1 | 0 | 5 | 0 |
| 24 | (Croatia) | DF | Luka Šimunović | 0 | 0 | 0 | 0 | 0 | 0 | 0 | 0 | 1 | 0 | 1 | 0 |
| 27 | (Kazakhstan) | DF | Yuriy Logvinenko | 4 | 0 | 0 | 0 | 0 | 0 | 0 | 0 | 0 | 0 | 4 | 0 |
| 29 | (Kazakhstan) | MF | Madi Zhakypbayev | 1 | 0 | 0 | 0 | 0 | 0 | 0 | 0 | 0 | 0 | 1 | 0 |
| 44 | (Kazakhstan) | DF | Yevgeny Postnikov | 4 | 0 | 0 | 0 | 1 | 0 | 0 | 0 | 1 | 0 | 6 | 0 |
| 77 | (Kazakhstan) | DF | Dmitri Shomko | 3 | 0 | 0 | 0 | 1 | 0 | 0 | 0 | 0 | 0 | 4 | 0 |
| 99 | (Kazakhstan) | FW | Aleksey Shchotkin | 1 | 0 | 0 | 0 | 0 | 0 | 0 | 0 | 0 | 0 | 1 | 0 |
Players who left Astana during the season:
| 25 | (Kazakhstan) | DF | Serhiy Malyi | 2 | 0 | 0 | 0 | 0 | 0 | 0 | 0 | 0 | 0 | 2 | 0 |
| | | | TOTALS | 36 | 0 | 0 | 0 | 3 | 0 | 0 | 0 | 5 | 0 | 44 | 0 |
