= Lev Skvortsov =

Kazakhstani footballer (born 2000)

Personal information
- Full name: Lev Igorevich Skvortsov
- Date of birth: 2 February 2000 (age 26)
- Place of birth: Astana, Kazakhstan
- Height: 1.80 m (5 ft 11 in)
- Positions: Right-back; right midfielder

Team information
- Current team: Shakhter Karagandy
- Number: 5

Youth career
- Astana

Senior career*
Years	Team	Apps	(Gls)
2018–2022	Astana	2	(0)
2020	→ Atyrau (loan)	10	(0)
2022–2023	Turan	22	(0)
2023–2024	Khimki	22	(0)
2024	→ Shinnik Yaroslavl (loan)	15	(0)
2025	Aktobe	17	(1)
2026	Serik Spor	16	(1)
2026–	Shakhter Karagandy	16	(0)

International career^{‡}
2017–2018	Kazakhstan U-19	19	(7)
2019–2022	Kazakhstan U-21	18	(0)
2023–	Kazakhstan	8	(0)
- * Club domestic league appearances and goals as of 1 November 2026 ‡ National team caps and goals as of 13 October 2024

Lev Igorevich Skvortsov (Russian: Лев Игоревич Скворцов; born 2 February 2000) is a Kazakh football player who plays as a right midfielder for Shakhter Karagandy. He also played as a right-back and left-back in the past.

== Career ==
=== Club ===
On 2 March 2020, Skvortsov joined Atyrau on a season-long loan deal from Astana.

On 11 February 2023, Khimki announced the signing of Skvortsov from Turan. On 12 June 2024, Skvortsov moved on a season-long loan to Shinnik Yaroslavl.

On 19 December 2024, Skvortsov returned to Kazakhstan and signed with Aktobe.

On 9 January 2026, TFF 1. Lig club Serikspor announced the signing of Skvortsov on a contract until the end of the season.

== Career statistics ==
=== Club ===
As of match played 1 November 2026

Club	Season	League			National Cup		Continental		Other		Total	
Club	Season	Division	Apps	Goals	Apps	Goals	Apps	Goals	Apps	Goals	Apps	Goals
Astana	2018	Kazakhstan Premier League	1	0	1	0	0	0	0	0	2	0
Astana	2019	Kazakhstan Premier League	0	0	1	0	0	0	0	0	1	0
Astana	2020	Kazakhstan Premier League	0	0	0	0	0	0	0	0	0	0
Astana	2021	Kazakhstan Premier League	1	0	5	0	0	0	0	0	6	0
Astana	Total		2	0	7	0	0	0	0	0	9	0
Atyrau (loan)	2020	Kazakhstan First Division	10	0	0	0	0	0	0	0	10	0
Turan	2022	Kazakhstan Premier League	22	0	2	0	–				24	0
Khimki	2022–23	Russian Premier League	8	0	0	0	–				8	0
Khimki	2023–24	Russian First League	14	0	2	1	–				16	1
Khimki	Total		22	0	2	1	0	0	0	0	24	1
Shinnik Yaroslavl	2024–25	Russian First League	15	2	0	0	–				17	0
Aktobe	2025	Kazakhstan Premier League	17	1	1	0	3 (Note: One appearances in Europa League and Two in Conference League)	0	1 (Note: Kazakhstan Super Cup)	0	22	1
Serikspor	2025–26	TFF 1. Lig	16	1	0	0	–				16	1
Shakhter Karagandy	2026	Kazakhstan First League	16	0	0	0	–				16	0
Career total			120	2	14	1	3	0	1	0	138	3

=== International ===
As of match played 26 March 2023

Kazakhstan
Year	Apps	Goals
2023	1	0
Total	1	0
