= Dmytro Nepohodov =

Kazakhstani footballer

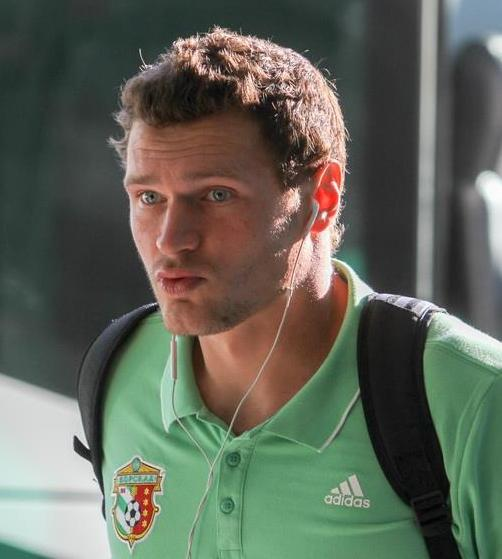

Personal information
- Full name: Dmytro Mykhaylovych Nepohodov
- Date of birth: 17 February 1988 (age 38)
- Place of birth: Kyiv, Ukrainian SSR, Soviet Union
- Height: 1.99 m (6 ft 6 1/2 in)
- Position: Goalkeeper

Team information
- Current team: Ulytau
- Number: 1

Youth career
- 2001–2002: Dynamo Kyiv
- 2002–2003: Zmina-Obolon Kyiv
- 2003: Dynamo Kyiv
- 2004–2005: Vidradnyi Kyiv

Senior career*
Years	Team	Apps	(Gls)
2007–2009	Marseille	0	(0)
2009–2012	Metalurh Donetsk	16	(0)
2011–2012	→ Banants (loan)	13	(0)
2012–2016	Vorskla Poltava	56	(0)
2017–2018	Tobol	61	(0)
2019–2021	Astana	24	(0)
2019	→ Ordabasy (loan)	29	(0)
2022	Tobol	2	(0)
2022–2023	Chornomorets Odesa	21	(0)
2023–2024	Podillya Khmelnytskyi	35	(0)
2025–	Ulytau	52	(0)

International career^{‡}
2005	Ukraine U17	2	(0)
2005–2006	Ukraine U18	6	(0)
2006	Ukraine U19	1	(0)
2008–2011	Ukraine U21	2	(0)
2018–2021	Kazakhstan	13	(0)
- * Club domestic league appearances and goals as of 1 November 2026 ‡ National team caps and goals as of 2 January 2023

Dmytro Mykhaylovych Nepohodov (Ukrainian: Дмитро Михайлович Непогодов; born 17 February 1988) is a professional footballer who plays as a goalkeeper for Ulytau. Born in Ukraine, he played for the Kazakhstan national team.

== Career ==
=== Club ===
Nepohodov's first professional club was Olympique de Marseille in France Ligue 1, but he didn't make his debut in this team. Next he signed a contract with FC Metalurh Donetsk in Ukrainian Premier League and made his debut against FC Chornomorets Odesa on 18 April 2010.

On 17 January 2018, Tobol announced that Nepohodov had signed a new one-year contract with the club.

On 14 January 2019, Nepohodov signed for FC Ordabasy on loan from FC Astana, returning to Astana in January 2020. On 5 January 2022, Astana announced that Nepohodov had left the club after his contract had expired.

On 27 January 2022, Nepohodov signed a one-year contract with Tobol. On 15 June 2022, Tobol announced that Nepohodov had left the club by mutual agreement.

=== International ===
On 2 October 2018, Nepohodov was called up to the Kazakhstan national team for their UEFA Nations League matches against Latvia and Andorra on 11 October and 16 October 2018. He made his debut for the squad on 19 November 2018 in a Nations League game against Georgia.

== Career statistics ==
=== Club ===
As of match played 14 May 2022

Appearances and goals by club, season and competition
Club	Season	League			National Cup		League Cup		Continental		Other		Total	
Club	Season	Division	Apps	Goals	Apps	Goals	Apps	Goals	Apps	Goals	Apps	Goals	Apps	Goals
Marseille	2008–09	Ligue 1	0	0	0	0	0	0	0	0	–		0	0
Metalurh Donetsk	2009–10	Ukrainian Premier League	2	0	0	0	–		–		–		13	0
Metalurh Donetsk	2010–11	Ukrainian Premier League	14	0	0	0	–		–		–		13	0
Metalurh Donetsk	2011–12	Ukrainian Premier League	0	0	0	0	–		–		–		13	0
Metalurh Donetsk	2012–13	Ukrainian Premier League	0	0	0	0	–		0	0	0	0	0	0
Metalurh Donetsk	Total		16	0	0	0	-	-	0	0	0	0	16	0
Banants (loan)	2011	Armenian Premier League	13	0	0	0	–		2	0	–		15	0
Vorskla Poltava	2012–13	Ukrainian Premier League	5	0	0	0	–		-		-		5	0
Vorskla Poltava	2013–14	Ukrainian Premier League	27	0	1	0	–		-		-		28	0
Vorskla Poltava	2014–15	Ukrainian Premier League	3	0	0	0	–		-		-		3	0
Vorskla Poltava	2015–16	Ukrainian Premier League	8	0	2	0	–		1	0	-		11	0
Vorskla Poltava	2016–17	Ukrainian Premier League	13	0	1	0	–		0	0	-		14	0
Vorskla Poltava	Total		56	0	4	0	-	-	1	0	-	-	61	0
Tobol	2017	Kazakhstan Premier League	33	0	1	0	–		–		–		34	0
Tobol	2018	Kazakhstan Premier League	28	0	2	0	–		4	0	-		34	0
Tobol	Total		61	0	3	0	-	-	4	0	-	-	68	0
Astana	2019	Kazakhstan Premier League	0	0	0	0	–		0	0	0	0	0	0
Astana	2020	Kazakhstan Premier League	5	0	0	0	–		1	0	0	0	6	0
Astana	2021	Kazakhstan Premier League	19	0	3	0	–		4	0	2	0	28	0
Astana	Total		24	0	3	0	-	-	5	0	2	0	34	0
Ordabasy (loan)	2019	Kazakhstan Premier League	29	0	4	0	–		4	0	–		37	0
Tobol	2022	Kazakhstan Premier League	2	0	0	0	–		0	0	–		2	0
Career total			201	0	14	0	0	0	16	0	2	0	233	0

=== International ===
Kazakhstan national team
Year	Apps	Goals
2018	1	0
2019	11	0
Total	12	0

Statistics accurate as of match played 19 November 2019
