= Žarko Tomašević =

Montenegrin footballer

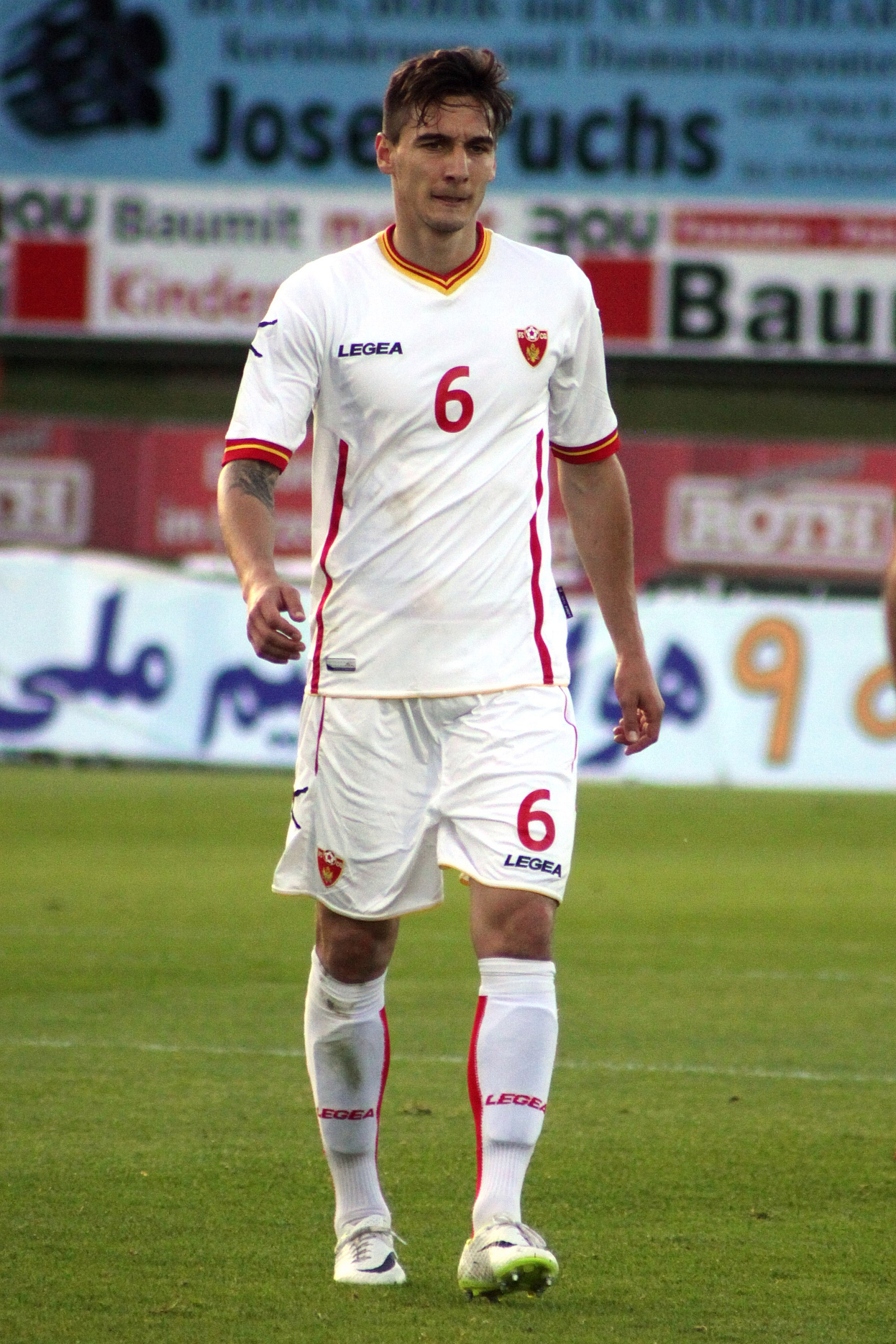
- Tomašević with Montenegro in 2014

Personal information
- Date of birth: 22 February 1990 (age 36)
- Place of birth: Pljevlja, SR Montenegro, Yugoslavia
- Height: 1.90 m (6 ft 3 in)
- Position: Centre back

Team information
- Current team: Dečić
- Number: 5

Youth career
- 2006–2008: Partizan
- 2008–2009: Mornar Bar
- 2009–2009: Nacional

Senior career*
Years	Team	Apps	(Gls)
2009–2012	Nacional	29	(0)
2011–2012	→ União Madeira (loan)	9	(1)
2012–2013	Partizan	0	(0)
2013–2016	Kortrijk	102	(9)
2016–2019	Oostende	73	(3)
2019–2021	Astana	34	(4)
2022	Tobol	22	(1)
2023	Astana	16	(1)
2024–2026	Dečić	38	(1)

International career^{‡}
2009–2013	Montenegro U21	18	(2)
2010–2023	Montenegro	65	(5)
- * Club domestic league appearances and goals as of 17 June 2026 ‡ National team caps and goals as of 22 November 2023

Žarko Tomašević (Montenegrin Cyrillic: Жapкo Toмaшeвић, pronounced [ʒǎːrko tomǎːʃevitɕ]; born 22 February 1990) is a Montenegrin footballer who plays as a central defender.

== Club career ==
Born in Pljevlja, SR Montenegro, SFR Yugoslavia, Tomašević arrived in Portugal with CD Nacional aged 18. In 2009, he was called up to the first team by Manuel Machado, making his first division debut in a 1–1 home draw against Sporting CP, on 15 August 2009, and also totalled 17 minutes combined in the Madeiran club's historical UEFA Europa League 5–4 aggregate win against Zenit Saint Petersburg.

After very little playing time during the first half of the 2011–12 season, Tomašević was loaned to C.F. União in the second level, until June, reuniting with former Nacional coach Predrag Jokanović.

In summer 2012 he was released by Nacional, and at 14 September he was announced as a new reinforcement of FK Partizan. This will be his return to Serbia with Partizan, as he already spent some time as a youngster in the youth team of the club.

On 3 August 2019, FC Astana announced the signing of Tomašević on a free transfer.

After leaving Astana at the end of the 2021 season, Tomašević went on to sign a one-year contract with Tobol on 27 January 2022. On 15 January 2023, Tobol announced that they had terminated their contract with Tomašević by mutual consent, with Tomašević re-signing for Astana the same day.

== International career ==
In late August 2009, Tomašević was first called to the Montenegro under-21 squad, for a 2011 European Championship qualifier against Sweden, in which his country lost 2–0 at home.

In May 2010, aged 20, he made his full international debut against Norway. In 2014, he scored his first international goal for Montenegro against Moldova in a 2016 European Championship qualification match.

== Career statistics ==
=== Club ===
As of match played 30 October 2021

Club	Season	League			Cup		League Cup		Europe		Other		Total	
Club	Season	Division	Apps	Goals	Apps	Goals	Apps	Goals	Apps	Goals	Apps	Goals	Apps	Goals
Nacional	2009–10	Primeira Liga	17	0	1	0	2	0	7	1	—		27	1
Nacional	2010–11	Primeira Liga	9	0	1	0	1	0	—		—		11	0
Nacional	2011–12	Primeira Liga	3	0	0	0	—		1	0	—		4	0
Nacional	Total		29	0	2	0	3	0	8	1	-	-	42	1
União Madeira (loan)	2011–12	Liga de Honra	8	1	—		—		—		—		8	1
Partizan	2012–13	Serbian SuperLiga	0	0	0	0	—		0	0	—		0	0
Kortrijk	2013–14	Jupiler Pro League	31	0	4	0	—		—		—		35	0
Kortrijk	2014–15	Jupiler Pro League	39	4	1	0	—		—		—		40	4
Kortrijk	2015–16	Jupiler Pro League	32	5	3	0	—		—		—		35	5
Kortrijk	Total		92	9	8	0	—		—		—		100	9
Oostende	2016–17	Jupiler Pro League	21	0	3	0	—		—		1	0	25	0
Oostende	2017–18	Jupiler Pro League	26	2	2	0	—		2	0	6	0	25	2
Oostende	2018–19	Jupiler Pro League	19	1	2	0	—		—		0	0	25	2
Oostende	Total		66	3	7	0	—		2	0	7	0	82	3
Astana	2019	Kazakhstan Premier League	2	0	0	0	—		4	0	0	0	6	0
Astana	2020	Kazakhstan Premier League	11	3	0	0	—		0	0	0	0	11	3
Astana	2021	Kazakhstan Premier League	21	1	3	1	—		4	0	2	1	30	3
Astana	Total		34	4	3	1	—		8	0	2	1	47	6
Tobol	2022	Kazakhstan Premier League	22	1	0	0	—		5	1	1	0	28	2
Career total			251	18	20	1	3	0	23	2	10	1	308	22

=== International ===
As of match played 27 March 2021

National team	Year	Apps	Goals
Montenegro	2010	2	0
Montenegro	2011	—	
Montenegro	2012	—	
Montenegro	2013	—	
Montenegro	2014	6	1
Montenegro	2015	6	0
Montenegro	2016	6	2
Montenegro	2017	6	1
Montenegro	2018	6	0
Montenegro	2019	5	0
Montenegro	2020	—	
Montenegro	2021	1	1
Total		38	5

==== International goals ====
Scores and results list Montenegro's goal tally first.

No.	Date	Venue	Opponent	Score	Result	Competition
1.	8 September 2014	Podgorica City Stadium, Podgorica, Montenegro	Moldova	2–0	2–0	UEFA Euro 2016 qualification
2.	24 March 2016	Karaiskakis Stadium, Piraeus, Greece	Greece	1–1	1–2	Friendly
3.	8 October 2016	Podgorica City Stadium, Podgorica, Montenegro	Kazakhstan	1–0	5–0	2018 FIFA World Cup qualification
4.	8 October 2017	National Stadium, Warsaw, Poland	Poland	2–2	2–4	2018 FIFA World Cup qualification
5.	27 March 2021	Podgorica City Stadium, Podgorica, Montenegro	Gibraltar	3–1	4–1	2022 FIFA World Cup qualification
