= Cadete =

Spanish footballer

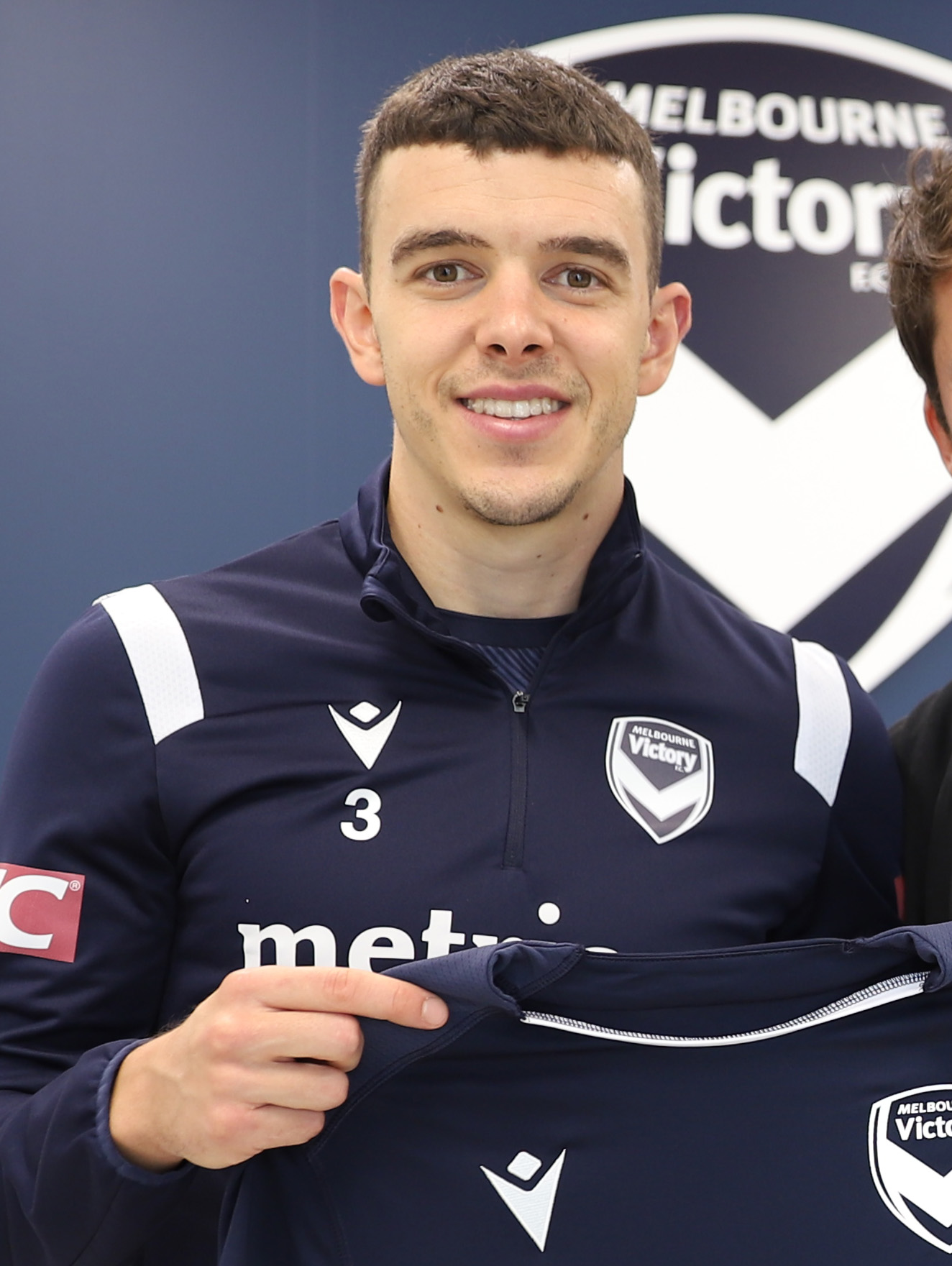

Personal information
- Full name: Enrique López Fernández
- Date of birth: 24 June 1994 (age 32)
- Place of birth: Madrid, Spain
- Height: 1.86 m (6 ft 1 in)
- Position: Left-back

Team information
- Current team: Sabah FC
- Number: 34

Youth career
- Alcobendas
- 2012–2013: Alcorcón

Senior career*
Years	Team	Apps	(Gls)
2011–2012	Alcobendas		
2013–2014	Alcorcón B	20	(0)
2014–2015	Unión Adarve	27	(0)
2015	Atlético Astorga	0	(0)
2015–2016	Unión Adarve	30	(3)
2016	Rayo Vallecano B	1	(0)
2016–2018	Unión Adarve	57	(0)
2018–2020	Atlético San Luis	51	(3)
2019–2020	→ Querétaro (loan)	18	(0)
2021	Astana	21	(0)
2022–2023	Melbourne Victory	25	(1)
2023–2024	Dinamo Tbilisi	24	(1)
2024–2025	Real Murcia	23	(1)
2025–2026	Forca Kochi	4	(0)
2026–	Guadalajara	2	(0)
2026–	Sabah FC	0	(0)
- * Club domestic league appearances and goals as of 23 July 2026

Enrique López Fernández (born 24 June 1994), known as Cadete or Kadete, is a Spanish professional footballer who plays as a left back for Malaysian Super League club Sabah FC.

== Club career ==
Cadete was born in Madrid, and made his senior debut with Alcobendas CF in the regional leagues. In 2012 he moved to AD Alcorcón, and spent one full season in the youth setup before featuring regularly for the reserves in Tercera División.

On 18 June 2014, Cadete joined fellow fourth division side AD Unión Adarve. On 4 August of the following year, he signed for Atlético Astorga FC in Segunda División B, but left the club six days later after allegedly having discrepancies with the club's presidency.

Cadete subsequently returned to Adarve, but moved to Rayo Vallecano B in July 2016. He left the latter in early September, and rejoined Adarve for a third stint, achieving promotion to the third division at the end of the season.

On 29 May 2018, Cadete moved abroad for the first time in his career, joining Ascenso MX side Atlético San Luis. He made his professional debut on 21 July, starting in a 0–0 home draw against Mineros de Zacatecas.

Cadete scored his first professional goal on 18 August 2018, netting the opener in a 4–0 away routing of Celaya FC.

On 7 April 2021, FC Astana announced the signing of Cadete.

On 22 July 2022 Melbourne Victory announced that they had signed Lopez for the upcoming season.

On 13 September 2023, Dinamo Tbilisi announced the signing of Cadete on a contract until the end of 2024.

On 20 July 2024, Cadete returned to Spain and signed with Real Murcia.

On 23 January 2026, Cadete joined Guadalajara in Primera Federación.

== Career statistics ==
=== Club ===
As of match played 24 November 2023

Appearances and goals by club, season and competition
Club	Season	League			National Cup		Continental		Other		Total	
Club	Season	Division	Apps	Goals	Apps	Goals	Apps	Goals	Apps	Goals	Apps	Goals
Atlético San Luis	2018–19	Ascenso MX	40	3	1	0	—		—		41	3
Atlético San Luis	2019–20	Liga MX	0	0	0	0	—		—		0	0
Atlético San Luis	2020–21	Liga MX	11	0	0	0	—		—		11	0
Atlético San Luis	Total		51	3	1	0	-	-	-	-	52	3
Querétaro (loan)	2019–20	Liga MX	18	0	5	0	—		—		23	0
Astana	2021	Kazakhstan Premier League	21	0	7	0	2 (Note: Appearances in the UEFA Europa Conference League)	0	0 (Note: Appearances in the Kazakhstan Super Cup)	0	30	0
Melbourne Victory	2022–23	A-League	25	1	1	0	—		—		26	1
Dinamo Tbilisi	2023	Erovnuli Liga	8	1	1	0	0 (Note: Zero appearances in the UEFA Champions League and UEFA Europa Conference League)	0	—		9	1
Career total			113	5	14	0	2	0	0	0	140	5

== Honours ==
- Ascenso MX (2): Apertura 2018, Clausura 2019
