= Vladislav Prokopenko =

Kazakhstani footballer

Personal information
- Full name: Vladislav Vyacheslavovich Prokopenko
- Date of birth: 1 July 2000 (age 26)
- Place of birth: Astana, Kazakhstan
- Height: 1.74 m (5 ft 8 1/2 in)
- Position: Forward

Team information
- Current team: Shakhter Karagandy
- Number: 10

Youth career
- Astana

Senior career*
Years	Team	Apps	(Gls)
2017–2024	Astana	39	(1)
2020	→ Aktobe (loan)	10	(2)
2024	→ Zhenis (loan)	13	(1)
2025–2026	Okzhetpes	15	(0)
2026–	Shakhter Karagandy	15	(1)
- * Club domestic league appearances and goals as of 1 November 2026

Vladislav Vyacheslavovich Prokopenko (Russian: Владислав Вячеславович Прокопенко; born 1 July 2000) is a Kazakh football player who plays as forward for Kazakhstan First League club Shakhter Karagandy.

== Career statistics ==
=== Club ===
As of match played 17 May 2023

Club	Season	League			National Cup		Continental		Other		Total	
Club	Season	Division	Apps	Goals	Apps	Goals	Apps	Goals	Apps	Goals	Apps	Goals
Astana	2016	Kazakhstan Premier League	0	0	0	0	0	0	0	0	0	0
Astana	2017	Kazakhstan Premier League	4	0	0	0	0	0	0	0	4	0
Astana	2018	Kazakhstan Premier League	6	0	1	1	0	0	0	0	7	1
Astana	2019	Kazakhstan Premier League	1	0	1	0	0	0	0	0	2	0
Astana	2020	Kazakhstan Premier League	0	0	0	0	0	0	0	0	0	0
Astana	2021	Kazakhstan Premier League	11	0	8	0	0	0	0	0	19	0
Astana	2022	Kazakhstan Premier League	4	0	4	2	0	0	0	0	8	2
Astana	2023	Kazakhstan Premier League	7	1	3	2	0	0	1	0	11	3
Astana	Total		33	1	17	5	0	0	1	0	51	6
Aktobe (loan)	2020	Kazakhstan First Division	10	2	0	0	—		—		10	2
Career total			43	3	17	5	0	0	1	0	61	8
