= Luka Šimunović =

Croatian footballer

Personal information
- Date of birth: 24 May 1997 (age 29)
- Place of birth: Livno, Bosnia and Herzegovina
- Height: 1.85 m (6 ft 1 in)
- Position: Centre back

Team information
- Current team: Triglav Kranj

Youth career
- 2011–2014: NK Zagreb

Senior career*
Years	Team	Apps	(Gls)
2014–2016	NK Zagreb	2	(0)
2016	→ Segesta (loan)	11	(0)
2016	Rudeš	9	(0)
2017	Spartaks Jūrmala	23	(1)
2018	Shakhtyor Soligorsk	14	(1)
2019–2021	Astana	51	(0)
2022	Šibenik	9	(0)
2022	→ Shakhtyor Soligorsk (loan)	6	(0)
2023	Lahti	10	(0)
2024–	Triglav Kranj	24	(0)
- * Club domestic league appearances and goals as of 16 January 2025

Luka Šimunović (born 24 May 1997) is a Croatian professional footballer for Triglav Kranj.

== Career ==
=== Club ===
On 22 February 2019, FC Astana announced the signing of Šimunović on a three-year contract from Shakhtyor Soligorsk.

On 9 March 2022, Šimunović returned to Croatia and signed a 2.5-year contract with Šibenik.

On 20 July 2023, Šimunović signed a contract with Finnish Veikkausliiga club Lahti for the rest of the 2023 season.

== Career statistics ==
=== Club ===
As of 16 January 2025

Appearances and goals by club, season and competition
Club	Season	League			National Cup		Continental		Other		Total	
Club	Season	Division	Apps	Goals	Apps	Goals	Apps	Goals	Apps	Goals	Apps	Goals
NK Zagreb	2014–15	1. HNL	2	0	1	0	–		–		3	0
NK Zagreb	2015–16	1. HNL	0	0	0	0	–		–		0	0
NK Zagreb	Total		2	0	1	0	-	-	-	-	3	0
Segesta (loan)	2015–16	2. HNL	11	0	0	0	–		–		11	0
Rudeš	2016–17	2. HNL	9	0	2	0	–		–		11	0
Spartaks Jūrmala	2017	Virslīga	23	1	5	0	1	0	–		29	1
Shakhtyor Soligorsk	2018	Belarusian Premier League	14	1	0	0	1	0	–		15	1
Astana	2019	Kazakhstan Premier League	18	0	1	0	10	0	0	0	29	0
Astana	2020	Kazakhstan Premier League	8	0	0	0	2	0	0	0	10	0
Astana	2021	Kazakhstan Premier League	25	0	7	0	3	0	2	0	37	0
Astana	Total		51	0	8	0	15	0	2	0	76	0
Šibenik	2021–22	1. HNL	9	0	0	0	–		–		9	0
Shakhtyor Soligorsk (loan)	2022	Belarusian Premier League	6	0	0	0	2	0	–		8	0
FC Lahti	2023	Veikkausliiga	10	0	–		–		–		10	0
Triglav Kranj	2023–24	Slovenian Second League	10	0	1	0	–		–		11	0
Triglav Kranj	2024–25	Slovenian Second League	14	0	1	0	–		–		15	0
Triglav Kranj	Total		24	0	2	0	0	0	0	0	26	0
Career total			135	2	15	0	19	0	2	0	171	2
