= Ololade Ebong =

Nollywood film director and cinematographer

Ololade Tijani Ebong
- Born: Lagos, Nigeria
- Education: Ahmadu Bello University New York Film Academy
- Occupations: Film Producer, Director, Cinematographer
- Known for: Ogeere
- Notable work: Ogeere, Etutu, Odun'baku
- Awards: 2023:WorldFest Houston International Film Festival 2023: Africa Magic Viewers' Choice Awards

Ololade Tijani Ebong is a Nollywood Film Producer, director and cinematographer. She is the Chief Executive Officer of Speed Films Productions Ltd and the brain behind Speed Films App. She has received various accolades, including WorldFest- Houston International Film Festival as a winning director in 2023 and many other nominations internationally and within Africa. Her movie, The Diary of Bolanle was selected at the Cannes Short Film Festival 2018 in France.

== Early life and education ==
Ololade grew up in Lagos State and obtained her first degree in Theatre and Performing Arts from Ahmadu Bello University, Zaria, Kaduna State. After that, she also studied Cinematography at the New York Film Academy.

== Career ==
Ololade developed an interest in cinematography after her participation in a practical field workshop at the National Film Institute in Jos, Plateau State. She began her filmmaking career in 2005 and made her breakthrough with her award winning short film The Diary of Bolanle. winning the Best Student Film at the Los Angeles Cinema Festival of Nollywood in California http://hollywoodcff.com/Home. WorldFest-Houston International Film Festival, selection at the Cannes Short Film Festival, In 2019, Semi-Finalist at the African International Film Festival (AFRIFF) in Nigeria, and a selection at the California's women's Film Festival. In 2023, Ololade received the Bronze Remi award for co-directing Ogeere at the 2023 WorldFest-Houston International Film Festival. She received an O1-b approval from the United States of America as a person with extraordinary ability in her field

In 2019, she founded Speed Films Productions Ltd, located in Victoria Island. A film productions company where she produced Ogeere, and most her film productions.

In 2023, she established a streaming platform called the Speed Films app where viewers can globally stream movies.

In 2024, Ololade went ahead to create the Speed Films website, to further ease global streaming of African movies.

== Awards ==
- 2018: Diary of Bolanle: Winner: Los Angeles Cinema Festival of Hollywood
- 2019: Diary of Bolanle: Winner: WorldFest-Houston International Film Festival
- 2019: City People Awards by City People Magazine
- 2021: Family: Winner: City People Magazine
- 2022: Ipin Mi: Winner: Athvikvaruni International Film Festival
- 2023: Ipin Mi: Nomination: African Indigenous Language Film Festival
- 2023: Ife Aimo: Nomination: African Indigenous Language Film Festival
- 2023: Ife Aimo: Nominated: Faith and Family Chicago Film Festival
- 2023: Ogeere: Winner: WorldFest-Houston International Film Festival
- 2023: Ogeere: Nominated: Africa Magic Viewers' Choice Award
- 2024: Ogeere: Nominated: Africa Magic Viewers' Choice Award
- 2026: Itansan Oorun (Sunrays): Nominated: Kano Indigenous Languages of Africa Film Market and Festival
