= Max Ebong =

Belarusian footballer

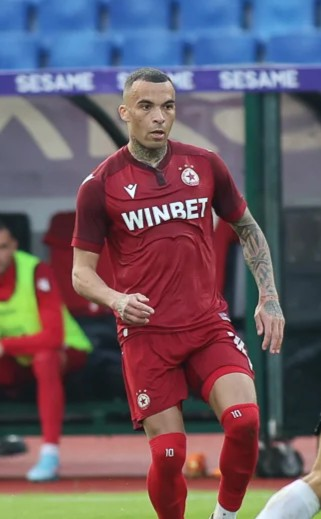

Personal information
- Full name: Afrid Max Ebong Ngome
- Date of birth: 26 August 1999 (age 27)
- Place of birth: Vitebsk, Belarus
- Height: 1.80 m (5 ft 11 in)
- Position: Midfielder

Team information
- Current team: CSKA Sofia
- Number: 7

Youth career
- 2016–2018: Shakhtyor Soligorsk

Senior career*
Years	Team	Apps	(Gls)
2018–2019	Shakhtyor Soligorsk	33	(2)
2020–2025	Astana	126	(10)
2026–	CSKA Sofia	29	(4)

International career^{‡}
2018–2019	Belarus U21	10	(1)
2019–	Belarus	64	(6)
- * Club domestic league appearances and goals as of 17:58, 22 November 2026 (UTC) ‡ National team caps and goals as of 15 November 2026 (UTC)

Afrid Max Ebong Ngome (Belarusian: Макс Эбонг, romanized: Maks Ebonh; Russian: Макс Эбонг; born 26 August 1999) is a Belarusian professional footballer who plays as a midfielder for Bulgarian First League club CSKA Sofia and the Belarus national team.

== Club career ==
On 24 January 2020, FC Astana announced the signing of Ebong for a four-year contract. On 27 December 2025, Astana announced that Ebong was leaving the club to sign a three-year contract with CSKA Sofia.

== International career ==
Ebong made his first appearance for the Belarus national team on 9 September 2019, after coming on as a half-time substitute for Yury Kavalyow in a 1–0 loss against Wales in a friendly match.

== Personal life ==
Ebong was born in Vitebsk, Belarus, to a family of mixed Belarusian ancestry on his mother's side and Cameroonian on his father's side. His parents met at the Vitebsk medical university where both were students. Ebong is reportedly estranged from his father.

== Career statistics ==
=== Club ===
As of match played 22 November 2026

Appearances and goals by club, season and competition
Club	Season	League			National cup		League cup		Continental		Other		Total	
Club	Season	Division	Apps	Goals	Apps	Goals	Apps	Goals	Apps	Goals	Apps	Goals	Apps	Goals
Shakhtyor Soligorsk	2017	Belarusian Premier League	0	0	0	0	–		0	0	–		0	0
Shakhtyor Soligorsk	2018	Belarusian Premier League	16	2	2	2	–		4	1	–		22	5
Shakhtyor Soligorsk	2019	Belarusian Premier League	17	0	4	0	–		6	0	–		27	0
Shakhtyor Soligorsk	Total		33	2	6	2	0	0	10	1	0	0	49	5
Astana	2020	Kazakhstan Premier League	18	0	0	0	–		2	0	1	0	21	0
Astana	2021	Kazakhstan Premier League	20	5	4	1	–		3	0	2	0	29	6
Astana	2022	Kazakhstan Premier League	23	2	1	0	–		2	0	–		26	2
Astana	2023	Kazakhstan Premier League	19	0	4	0	–		12	0	1	0	36	0
Astana	2024	Kazakhstan Premier League	22	0	2	0	3	0	10	0	–		37	0
Astana	2025	Kazakhstan Premier League	24	3	2	0	–		3	0	–		29	3
Astana	Total		126	10	13	1	3	0	32	0	4	0	178	11
CSKA Sofia	2025–26	Bulgarian First League	17	3	4	1	–		–		–		21	4
CSKA Sofia	2026–27	Bulgarian First League	12	1	1	0	–		9	1	1	0	23	2
CSKA Sofia	Total		29	4	5	1	0	0	9	1	1	0	44	6
Career total			188	16	24	4	3	0	51	2	5	0	271	22

=== International ===
As of match played 15 November 2026

Appearances and goals by national team and year
National team	Year	Apps	Goals
Belarus	2019	2	0
Belarus	2020	6	2
Belarus	2021	10	0
Belarus	2022	8	0
Belarus	2023	9	3
Belarus	2024	9	0
Belarus	2025	10	0
Belarus	2026	10	1
Total		64	6

Scores and results list Belarus' goal tally first.

No.	Date	Venue	Opponent	Score	Result	Competition
1.	15 November 2020	Dinamo Stadium, Minsk, Belarus	Lithuania	2–0	2–0	2020–21 UEFA Nations League C
2.	18 November 2020	Arena Kombëtare, Tirana, Albania	Albania	2–3	2–3	2020–21 UEFA Nations League C
3.	16 June 2023	Szusza Ferenc Stadion, Budapest, Hungary	Israel	1–0	1–2	UEFA Euro 2024 qualifying
4.	19 June 2023	Szusza Ferenc Stadion, Budapest, Hungary	Kosovo	2–0	2–1	UEFA Euro 2024 qualifying
5.	15 October 2023	Kybunpark, St. Gallen, Switzerland	Switzerland	1–1	3–3	UEFA Euro 2024 qualifying
6.	3 October 2026	Illovszky Rudolf Stadion, Budapest, Hungary	San Marino	3–0	4–0	2026–27 UEFA Nations League C

== Honours ==
Shakhtyor Soligorsk

- Belarusian Cup: 2018–19

Astana

- Kazakhstan Premier League: 2022
- Kazakhstan Super Cup: 2020

CSKA Sofia

- Bulgarian Cup: 2025–26
- Bulgarian Supercup: 2026
