= Rangelo Janga =

Curaçaoan footballer (born 1992)

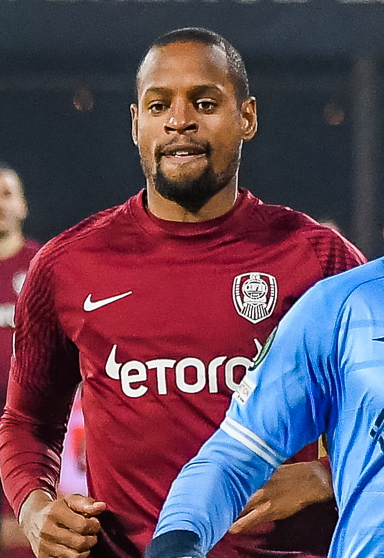
- Janga with CFR Cluj in 2023

Personal information
- Full name: Rangelo Maria Janga
- Date of birth: 16 April 1992 (age 34)
- Place of birth: Rotterdam, Netherlands
- Height: 1.92 m (6 ft 3 1/2 in)
- Position: Striker

Youth career
- JHR
- Excelsior Maassluis
- –2009: Excelsior
- 2009–2010: Willem II

Senior career*
Years	Team	Apps	(Gls)
2010–2012	Willem II	24	(3)
2012	→ Excelsior (loan)	16	(2)
2012–2014	Excelsior	36	(3)
2014–2015	Omonia Aradippou	26	(5)
2015–2016	Dordrecht	34	(21)
2016–2018	AS Trenčín	48	(28)
2018	Gent	17	(5)
2018–2022	Astana	40	(10)
2020	→ Lugano (loan)	13	(0)
2020–2021	→ NEC Nijmegen (loan)	36	(9)
2021–2022	→ Apollon Limassol (loan)	26	(4)
2022	Apollon Limassol	0	(0)
2022–2023	CFR Cluj	30	(10)
2023	Bnei Sakhnin	5	(0)
2023–2024	Nea Salamis Famagusta	17	(2)
2024–2026	FC Eindhoven	55	(16)

International career^{‡}
2009	Netherlands U17	5	(2)
2011	Netherlands U19	3	(0)
2016–2025	Curaçao	43	(21)
- * Club domestic league appearances and goals as of 24 April 2026 ‡ National team caps and goals as of 19 March 2025

Rangelo Maria Janga (born 16 April 1992) is a professional footballer. Born in the Netherlands, he played for the Curaçao national team and is their all time top goalscorer.

== Club career ==
On 20 July 2018, Janga signed for Astana.

On 17 February 2020, Janga moved to Lugano on loan until 30 June 2020.

On 22 August 2020, Janga moved to NEC Nijmegen on a one-year loan deal.

On 31 August 2022, he moved to CFR Cluj.

On 14 September 2023, he signed for Israeli Premier League club Bnei Sakhnin.

On 22 August 2024, Janga joined Eindhoven on a one-season contract, with the club option to extend for a second year. His contract ended in the summer of 2026, he is no longer part of FC Eindhoven's squad.

== International career ==
Born in the Netherlands to parents of Curaçaoan descent, Janga was called up, and debuted for the Curaçao national football team in a 1–0 loss against Barbados on 24 March 2016 in the first round of the 2017 Caribbean Cup qualification.

On 5 October 2016, he scored his first goal for Curaçao in a 3–0 win over Antigua and Barbuda in the third round of the 2017 Caribbean Cup qualification.

From 2019 to 2023, he was joint top goalscorer of Curaçao with Leandro Bacuna.

However, on 13 October 2023, in a 2–1 defeat against Panama national football team during the 2023–24 CONCACAF Nations League, he netted his 15th goal and became Curaçao sole top goalscorer.

== Career statistics ==
=== Club ===
As of match played 3 April 2026

Appearances and goals by club, season and competition
Club	Season	League			National cup (Note: Includes KNVB Cup, Slovak Cup, Kazakhstan Cup, Cypriot Cup, Cupa României)		Europe		Other		Total	
Club	Season	Division	Apps	Goals	Apps	Goals	Apps	Goals	Apps	Goals	Apps	Goals
Willem II	2010–11	Eredivisie	18	2	0	0	—		—		18	2
Willem II	2011–12	Eerste Divisie	6	1	1	0	—		—		7	1
Willem II	Total		24	3	1	0	0	0	0	0	25	3
Excelsior (loan)	2011–12	Eredivisie	16	2	—		—		—		16	2
Excelsior	2012–13	Eerste Divisie	24	3	0	0	—		—		24	3
Excelsior	2013–14	Eerste Divisie	12	0	0	0	—		2 (Note: Appearances in Eredivisie play-offs)	0	14	0
Excelsior	Total		36	3	0	0	0	0	2	0	38	3
Omonia Aradippou	2014–15	Cypriot Second Division	26	5	0	0	—		—		26	5
Dordrecht	2015–16	Eerste Divisie	34	21	2	1	—		—		36	22
AS Trenčín	2016–17	Slovak Super Liga	31	14	3	1	6 (Note: Four appearances and two goals in UEFA Champions League, two appearances in UEFA Europa League)	2	—		40	17
AS Trenčín	2017–18	Slovak Super Liga	17	14	2	2	0	0	—		19	16
AS Trenčín	Total		48	28	5	3	6	2	0	0	59	33
Gent	2017–18	Belgian First Division A	17	5	—		—		—		17	5
Astana	2018	Kazakhstan Premier League	10	4	0	0	10 (Note: Three appearances in UEFA Champions League, seven appearances in UEFA Europa League)	0	0	0	20	4
Astana	2019	Kazakhstan Premier League	30	6	1	0	12 (Note: Two appearances in UEFA Champions League, ten appearances and one goal in UEFA Europa League)	1	1 (Note: Appearance in Kazakhstan Super Cup)	0	44	7
Astana	2020	Kazakhstan Premier League	0	0	0	0	0	0	0	0	0	0
Astana	Total		40	10	1	0	22	1	1	0	64	11
Lugano (loan)	2019–20	Swiss Super League	13	0	0	0	—		—		13	0
NEC Nijmegen (loan)	2020–21	Eerste Divisie	36	9	2	2	—		3	1	41	12
Apollon Limassol (loan)	2021–22	Cypriot First Division	26	4	2	0	1 (Note: Appearance(s) in UEFA Europa Conference League)	0	—		29	4
Apollon Limassol	2022–23	Cypriot First Division	0	0	0	0	4 (Note: Appearances in UEFA Champions League)	1	1 (Note: Appearance in Cypriot Super Cup)	0	5	1
CFR Cluj	2022–23	Liga I	30	10	4	0	7	1	1 (Note: Appearance in Liga I European play-offs)	0	42	11
Bnei Sakhnin	2023–24	Israeli Premier League	5	0	0	0	—		–		5	0
Nea Salamis Famagusta	2023–24	Cypriot First Division	17	2	1	0	—		—		18	2
FC Eindhoven	2024–25	Eerste Divisie	21	6	0	0	—		—		21	6
FC Eindhoven	2025–26	Eerste Divisie	34	10	1	1	—		—		35	11
FC Eindhoven	Total		55	16	1	1	0	0	0	0	56	17
Career total			421	118	19	7	40	5	8	1	489	131

=== International ===
As of match played 19 March 2025

Appearances and goals by national team and year
National team	Year	Apps	Goals
Curaçao	2016	3	2
Curaçao	2017	8	2
Curaçao	2018	3	6
Curaçao	2019	5	1
Curaçao	2020	0	0
Curaçao	2021	6	2
Curaçao	2022	5	1
Curaçao	2023	8	4
Curaçao	2024	4	3
Curaçao	2025	1	0
Total		43	21

Scores and results list Curaçao's goal tally first.

List of international goals scored by Rangelo Janga
No.	Date	Venue	Opponent	Score	Result	Competition
1	5 October 2016	Ergilio Hato Stadium, Willemstad, Curaçao	Antigua and Barbuda	2–0	3–0	2017 Caribbean Cup qualification
2	11 October 2016	Juan Ramón Loubriel Stadium, Bayamón, Puerto Rico	Puerto Rico	1–2	4–2	2017 Caribbean Cup qualification
3	13 June 2017	Saputo Stadium, Montreal, Canada	Canada	1–0	1–2	Friendly
4	22 June 2017	Stade Pierre-Aliker, Fort-de-France, Martinique	Martinique	2–1	2–1	2017 Caribbean Cup
5	10 September 2018	Ergilio Hato Stadium, Willemstad, Curaçao	Grenada	5–0	10–0	2019–20 CONCACAF Nations League qualification
6	10 September 2018	Ergilio Hato Stadium, Willemstad, Curaçao	Grenada	8–0	10–0	2019–20 CONCACAF Nations League qualification
7	10 September 2018	Ergilio Hato Stadium, Willemstad, Curaçao	Grenada	9–0	10–0	2019–20 CONCACAF Nations League qualification
8	12 October 2018	IMG Academy, Bradenton, United States	U.S. Virgin Islands	1–0	5–0	2019–20 CONCACAF Nations League qualification
9	19 November 2018	Ergilio Hato Stadium, Willemstad, Curaçao	Guadeloupe	4–0	6–0	2019–20 CONCACAF Nations League qualification
10	19 November 2018	Ergilio Hato Stadium, Willemstad, Curaçao	Guadeloupe	6–0	6–0	2019–20 CONCACAF Nations League qualification
11	14 November 2019	Ergilio Hato Stadium, Willemstad, Curaçao	Costa Rica	1–1	1–2	2019–20 CONCACAF Nations League A
12	12 June 2021	Estadio Nacional, Panama City, Panama	Panama	1–2	1–2	2022 FIFA World Cup qualification
13	9 October 2021	Al Muharraq Stadium, Arad, Bahrain	New Zealand	1–2	1–2	Friendly
14	24 September 2022	Gelora Bandung Lautan Api Stadium, Bandung, Indonesia	Indonesia	1–0	2–3	Friendly
15	13 October 2023	Ergilio Hato Stadium, Willemstad, Curaçao	Panama	1–2	1–2	2023–24 CONCACAF Nations League A
16	17 October 2023	Ergilio Hato Stadium, Willemstad, Curaçao	Trinidad and Tobago	1–0	5–3	2023–24 CONCACAF Nations League A
17	17 October 2023	Ergilio Hato Stadium, Willemstad, Curaçao	Trinidad and Tobago	5–2	5–3	2023–24 CONCACAF Nations League A
18	20 November 2023	Ergilio Hato Stadium, Willemstad, Curaçao	El Salvador	1–0	1–1	Friendly
19	5 June 2024	Ergilio Hato Stadium, Willemstad, Curaçao	Barbados	1–0	4–1	2026 FIFA World Cup qualification
20	5 June 2024	Ergilio Hato Stadium, Willemstad, Curaçao	Barbados	2–0	4–1	2026 FIFA World Cup qualification
21	5 June 2024	Ergilio Hato Stadium, Willemstad, Curaçao	Barbados	3–0	4–1	2026 FIFA World Cup qualification

== Honours ==
Astana

- Kazakhstan Premier League: 2018, 2019
- Kazakhstan Super Cup: 2019

Apollon Limassol

- Cypriot First Division: 2021–22
- Cypriot Super Cup: 2022

Curaçao

- Caribbean Cup: 2017
