= Madi Zhakipbayev =

Kazakhstani footballer

Personal information
- Full name: Madi Muratuly Zhakipbayev
- Date of birth: 21 March 2000 (age 26)
- Place of birth: Astana, Kazakhstan
- Height: 1.74 m (5 ft 8 1/2 in)
- Position: Midfielder

Team information
- Current team: Zhetysu
- Number: 21

Senior career*
Years	Team	Apps	(Gls)
2016–2021	Astana	4	(0)
2018	→ Shakhter Karagandy (loan)	1	(0)
2024	FC Khan Tengri	23	(4)
2025	Kyzylzhar	8	(0)
2026–	Zhetysu	27	(1)

International career^{‡}
2015–2016	Kazakhstan U17	6	(1)
2017–	Kazakhstan U19		
- * Club domestic league appearances and goals as of 1 November 2026 ‡ National team caps and goals as of May 27, 2017

Madi Muratuly Zhakipbayev (Kazakh: Мәди Мұратұлы Жақыпбаев; born 21 March 2000) is a Kazakh footballer who plays as a midfielder for Zhetysu.
