= 2011 FC Shakhter Karagandy season =

Shakhter Karagandy
2011 season
- Manager: Viktor Kumykov
- Stadium: Shakhter Stadium
- Kazakhstan Premier League: 1st
- Kazakhstan Cup: Quarterfinal
- UEFA Europa League: Second qualifying round vs St Patrick's Athletic
- Top goalscorer: League: Sergei Khizhnichenko (16); All: Sergei Khizhnichenko (16)
Home colours	Away colours	Third colours

The 2011 FC Shakhter Karagandy season was the clubs twentieth successive season in the Kazakhstan Premier League, the highest tier of association football in Kazakhstan.

== Squad ==
As of match played 29 October 2011

No.	Name	Nationality	Position	Date of birth (age)	Signed from	Signed in	Apps.	Goals
Goalkeepers
1	Aleksandr Grigorenko	(Kazakhstan)	GK	6 February 1985 (aged 26)	Atyrau	2007		
16	Khamit Magayev	(Kazakhstan)	GK	10 June 1993 (aged 18)	Academy	2011	0	0
30	Igor Shatskiy	(Kazakhstan)	GK	11 May 1989 (aged 22)	Academy	2010	0	0
35	Aleksandr Mokin	(Kazakhstan)	GK	6 February 1985 (aged 26)	Atyrau	2011	35	0
	Serhiy Tkachuk	(Ukraine)	GK	15 February 1992 (aged 19)	Dynamo Kyiv	2011	0	0
Defenders
2	Aleksandr Kirov	(Kazakhstan)	DF	4 September 1984 (aged 27)	Astana	2011	16	0
4	Nikola Vasiljević	(Bosnia and Herzegovina)	DF	19 December 1983 (aged 27)	Zvijezda Gradačac	2011	37	5
5	Kairat Utabayev	(Kazakhstan)	DF	16 July 1988 (aged 23)	Kairat	2011	33	1
15	Igor Soloshenko	(Kazakhstan)	DF	22 May 1979 (aged 32)	Okzhetpes	2011	2	0
17	Andrey Paryvayew	(Belarus)	DF	3 January 1982 (aged 29)	Gorodeya	2011	11	0
18	Ivan Shevchenko	(Kazakhstan)	DF	10 September 1987 (aged 24)	Astana	2011	3	0
19	Yevgeny Tarasov	(Kazakhstan)	DF	16 April 1985 (aged 26)	Vostok	2009	49	0
20	Aldin Đidić	(Bosnia and Herzegovina)	DF	30 August 1983 (aged 28)	Baltika Kaliningrad	2010	69	9
22	Arsen Tyulenov	(Kazakhstan)	DF	22 July 1990 (aged 21)	Nasaf	2011	0	0
24	Arman Sahimov	(Kazakhstan)	DF	4 January 1991 (aged 20)	Academy	2010	0	0
29	Ayan Kusaynov	(Kazakhstan)	DF	10 June 1990 (aged 21)	Academy	2010	1	0
36	Yevgeny Krasikov	(Kazakhstan)	MF	6 September 1991 (aged 20)	Academy	2010	0	0
38	Alexander Nuykin	(Kazakhstan)	DF	26 January 1992 (aged 19)	Academy	2010	0	0
39	Alexander Malyshev	(Kazakhstan)	DF	25 February 1992 (aged 19)	Academy	2010	0	0
40	Fedor Rudenko	(Kazakhstan)	DF	28 March 1990 (aged 21)	Academy	2010	15	0
41	Pavel Lunyov	(Kazakhstan)	DF	19 January 1990 (aged 21)	Academy	2010	0	0
49	Artem Eletsky	(Kazakhstan)	DF	26 November 1992 (aged 18)	Academy	2011	0	0
Midfielders
3	Gediminas Vičius	(Lithuania)	MF	5 July 1985 (aged 26)	FBK Kaunas	2010	66	6
6	Ilnur Mangutkin	(Kazakhstan)	MF	16 September 1986 (aged 25)	Academy	2010	7	0
7	Askhat Borantayev	(Kazakhstan)	MF	22 August 1978 (aged 33)	Kaisar	2010	46	4
10	Zhambyl Kukeyev	(Kazakhstan)	MF	20 September 1988 (aged 23)	Lokomotiv Astana	2011	32	10
11	Maksat Baizhanov	(Kazakhstan)	MF	6 August 1984 (aged 27)	Zhetysu	2011	32	2
12	Igor Pikalkin	(Kazakhstan)	MF	19 March 1992 (aged 19)	Academy	2010	15	1
13	Vadim Borovskiy	(Kazakhstan)	MF	30 October 1986 (aged 24)	Atyrau	2010	40	0
21	Grigori Dubkov	(Kazakhstan)	MF	22 November 1990 (aged 20)	Academy	2010	30	0
23	Ulan Konysbayev	(Kazakhstan)	MF	28 May 1989 (aged 22)	loan from Astana	2011	15	3
27	Nursultan Zhusupov	(Kazakhstan)	MF	22 January 1993 (aged 18)	Academy	2011	0	0
28	Akhat Zholshorin	(Kazakhstan)	MF	28 June 1992 (aged 19)	Academy	2010	3	0
32	Stanislav Vasilyev	(Kazakhstan)	MF	17 November 1992 (aged 18)	Academy	2010	0	0
34	Nursultan Ganiyev	(Kazakhstan)	MF	1 January 1993 (aged 18)	Academy	2011	0	0
35	Sergey Kodzhebash	(Kazakhstan)	MF	2 May 1991 (aged 20)	Academy	2010	0	0
37	Zhomart Rsalin	(Kazakhstan)	MF	3 February 1991 (aged 20)	Academy	2011	0	0
42	Sergey Vetrov	(Kazakhstan)	MF	11 November 1994 (aged 16)	Academy	2011	0	0
47	Vladislav Akhmeyev	(Kazakhstan)	MF	19 December 1992 (aged 18)	Academy	2010	2	0
48	Akzhol Amanzholov	(Kazakhstan)	MF	1 March 1993 (aged 18)	Academy	2011	0	0
77	Dušan Petronijević	(Serbia)	MF	9 November 1983 (aged 27)	Borac Čačak	2011	11	0
Forwards
8	Serik Dosmanbetov	(Kazakhstan)	FW	8 March 1982 (aged 29)	Zhetysu	2011	21	4
9	Milanko Rašković	(Serbia)	FW	13 March 1981 (aged 30)	Čukarički	2011	20	4
14	Andrei Finonchenko	(Kazakhstan)	FW	21 June 1982 (aged 29)	Academy	2001	287	106
25	Toktar Zhangylyshbay	(Kazakhstan)	FW	9 July 1992 (aged 19)	Academy	2011	6	1
31	Khamid Nurmukhametov	(Kazakhstan)	FW	9 July 1992 (aged 19)	Academy	2010	0	0
37	Daniyar Zhankin	(Kazakhstan)	FW	28 February 1991 (aged 20)	Academy	2010	0	0
43	Aidos Tattybayev	(Kazakhstan)	FW	26 April 1990 (aged 21)	Gefest	2010	19	4
44	Vitaliy Li	(Kazakhstan)	FW	9 July 1992 (aged 19)	Kazakhmys	2010	0	0
78	Viorel Frunză	(Moldova)	FW	6 December 1979 (aged 31)	Neman Grodno	2011	8	0
91	Sergei Khizhnichenko	(Kazakhstan)	FW	17 July 1991 (aged 20)	Lokomotiv Astana	2011	37	16
Players that left during the season
23	Vyacheslav Erbes	(Kazakhstan)	MF	14 April 1988 (aged 23)	Lokomotiv Astana	2011	4	0
26	Kanat Aliyev	(Kazakhstan)	MF	9 February 1985 (aged 26)	Okzhetpes	2011	10	1
29	Zhandasyl Rymkhan	(Kazakhstan)	DF	21 March 1990 (aged 21)	Academy	2010	0	0

== Transfers ==
=== Winter ===
In: Note: Flags indicate national team as defined under FIFA eligibility rules; some limited exceptions apply. Players may hold more than one non-FIFA nationality.

No.	Pos.	Nation	Player
4	DF	BIH	Nikola Vasiljević (from (Bosnia and Herzegovina) Zvijezda Gradačac)
5	DF	KAZ	Kairat Utabayev (from (Kazakhstan) Kairat)
8	FW	KAZ	Serik Dosmanbetov (from (Kazakhstan) Zhetysu)
9	FW	SRB	Milanko Rašković (from (Serbia) Čukarički)
10	MF	KAZ	Zhambyl Kukeyev (from (Kazakhstan) Lokomotiv Astana)
11	MF	KAZ	Maksat Baizhanov (from (Kazakhstan) Zhetysu)
15	DF	KAZ	Igor Soloshenko (from (Kazakhstan) Okzhetpes)
17	DF	BLR	Andrey Paryvayew (from (Belarus) Gorodeya)
18	FW	KAZ	Ivan Shevchenko (from (Kazakhstan) Lokomotiv Astana)
23	MF	KAZ	Vyacheslav Erbes (from (Kazakhstan) Lokomotiv Astana)
26	MF	KAZ	Kanat Aliyev (from (Kazakhstan) Okzhetpes)
35	GK	KAZ	Aleksandr Mokin (from (Kazakhstan) Ordabasy)
91	FW	KAZ	Sergei Khizhnichenko (from (Kazakhstan) Lokomotiv Astana)

Out: Note: Flags indicate national team as defined under FIFA eligibility rules; some limited exceptions apply. Players may hold more than one non-FIFA nationality.

No.	Pos.	Nation	Player
2	DF	SRB	Saša Đorđević (to (Uzbekistan) Bunyodkor)
4	DF	KAZ	Aleksey Danaev (to (Kazakhstan) Tobol)
5	DF	KAZ	Aleksandr Kislitsyn (to (Kazakhstan) Tobol)
6	DF	KAZ	Sergei Kozyulin (to (Kazakhstan) Tarlan)
9	MF	KAZ	Sergei Skorykh (to (Kazakhstan) Zhetysu)
10	FW	KAZ	Sergei Shaff (to (Kazakhstan) Atyrau)
11	FW	RWA	Jimmy Mulisa (to (Kazakhstan) Vostok)
15	MF	RUS	Anatoli Bogdanov (to (Kazakhstan) Tobol)
16	GK	UKR	Sergei Sarana (to (Kazakhstan) Akzhayik)
17	MF	BLR	Alyaksey Suchkow (to (Belarus) Neman Grodno)
22	DF	KAZ	Yevgeni Goryachi (to (Kazakhstan) Kairat)
—	MF	KAZ	Mikhail Glushko
—	FW	KAZ	Ruslan Kenetayev (to (Kazakhstan) Okzhetpes)

=== Summer ===
In: Note: Flags indicate national team as defined under FIFA eligibility rules; some limited exceptions apply. Players may hold more than one non-FIFA nationality.

No.	Pos.	Nation	Player
2	DF	KAZ	Aleksandr Kirov (from (Kazakhstan) Astana)
23	MF	KAZ	Ulan Konysbayev (loan from (Kazakhstan) Astana)
77	MF	SRB	Dušan Petronijević (from (Serbia) Borac Čačak)
78	FW	MDA	Viorel Frunză (from (Belarus) Neman Grodno)

Out: Note: Flags indicate national team as defined under FIFA eligibility rules; some limited exceptions apply. Players may hold more than one non-FIFA nationality.

No.	Pos.	Nation	Player
23	MF	KAZ	Vyacheslav Erbes (to (Kazakhstan) Vostok)

== Competitions ==
=== Kazakhstan Premier League ===
==== First round ====
===== Results =====
7 March 2011 1	Shakhter Karagandy	1 – 0	Kaisar	Astana
17:30 (UTC+6)	Rašković 31'; G.Dubkov (yellow card) 53'; S.Dosmanbetov 69'	Report	A.Baltaev (yellow card) 25'; Crnogorac (yellow card) 53'; Orlovschi (yellow card) 69'; Edeipo (yellow card) 74'	Stadium: Astana Arena; Attendance: 1,500; Referee: Oleg Sokolov

12 March 2011 2	Shakhter Karagandy	0 – 2	Atyrau	Astana
18:30 (UTC+6)	Đidić (yellow card) 42'; Finonchenko (yellow card) 42'; V.Borovskiy (yellow card) 81'	Report	Bechan (yellow card) 34'; Leon (yellow card) 42' (goal) 73'; Travin (yellow card) 51' (goal) 53'; S.Shaff (yellow card) 83'	Stadium: Astana Arena; Attendance: 4,000; Referee: Bolat Karlibayev

17 March 2011 3	Shakhter Karagandy	3 – 0	Irtysh Pavlodar	Karaganda
17:30 (UTC+6)	Baizhanov 55' (pen.); Khizhnichenko 75'; Kukeyev 90+1'	Report	Coulibaly (yellow card) 43'; Akhmetov (yellow card) 44'; Daskalov (yellow card) 68'; Tleshev (yellow card) 73'; K.Zarechniy (yellow card) 73'	Stadium: Shakhter Stadium; Attendance: 1,500; Referee: Anatolyi Vishnichenko

31 March 2011 4	Tobol	1 – 2	Shakhter Karagandy	Kostanay
17:00 (UTC+6)	Kučera (yellow card) 42' (yellow-red card) 56'; Paryvayew 87' (o.g.)	Report	Utabayev (yellow card) 36'; A.Borantayev 42', 45'; Baizhanov (yellow card) 61'; Rašković (yellow card) 63'; Mokin (yellow card) 78'	Stadium: Stadion Zatobolets; Attendance: 3,800; Referee: Ruslan Duzmambetov

4 April 2011 5	Shakhter Karagandy	0 – 0	Astana	Karaganda
17:00 (UTC+6)	A.Barantsev (yellow card) 23'; Đidić (yellow card) 27'	Report		Stadium: Shakhter Stadium; Attendance: 3,000; Referee: Akmalkhan Kholmatov

9 April 2011 6	Ordabasy	1 – 0	Shakhter Karagandy	Shymkent
17:00 (UTC+6)	Irismetov (yellow card) 30'; Trajković (yellow card) 33'; Perić (yellow card) 42'; Yevstigneyev (yellow card) 69'; Mukhtarov 90'; Asanbayev (yellow card) 90'	Report	Rašković (yellow card) 40'; Utabayev (yellow card) 62'	Stadium: Kazhymukan Munaitpasov Stadium; Attendance: 2,000; Referee: Viktor Antonov

16 April 2011 7	Shakhter Karagandy	3 – 0	Taraz	Temirtau
17:30 (UTC+6)	Vičius 24'; Khizhnichenko 61'; Kukeyev (yellow card) 68'; K.Aliyev 75'	Report	A.Anarmetov (yellow card) 56'; Kurgulin (yellow card) 71'; Memišević (yellow card) 90+2'	Stadium: Metallurg Stadion; Attendance: 1,500; Referee: Igor Aleshin

24 April 2011 8	Aktobe	0 – 1	Shakhter Karagandy	Aktobe
17:00 (UTC+6)	Mané (yellow card) 34'; Chichulin (red card) 55'; Kenzhesariyev (yellow card) 74'; P.Badlo (yellow card) 87'	Report	Kukeyev 56'; Paryvayew (yellow card) 62'	Stadium: Central Stadium; Attendance: 3,000; Referee: Igor Khisamutdinov

30 April 2011 9	Shakhter Karagandy	3 – 3	Zhetysu	Temirtau
17:30 (UTC+6)	Khizhnichenko 33'; Baizhanov (yellow card) 75'; S.Dosmanbetov 77', 86'; Utabayev (yellow card) 90+3'	Report	Muzhikov 22'; Shchotkin 26'; Bakayev 73'	Stadium: Metallurg Stadion; Attendance: 5,000; Referee: Sergey Pasko

7 May 2011 10	Shakhter Karagandy	2 – 0	Vostok	Karaganda
17:30 (UTC+6)	Kukeyev 63' (pen.); Finonchenko (yellow card) 64'; Khizhnichenko 85'	Report	Mrđanin (yellow card) 45'; Kovachev (yellow card) 75'; R.Kismetov (yellow card) 89'	Stadium: Shakhter Stadium; Attendance: 9,000; Referee: Oleg Sokolov

15 May 2011 11	Kairat	2 – 1	Shakhter Karagandy	Almaty
18:00 (UTC+6)	Shestakov (yellow card) 34'; Golovskoy 49' (yellow card) 70'; Strukov 82'	Report	Rašković 22'; Utabayev (yellow card) 52'; A.Borantayev (yellow card) 66'	Stadium: Central Stadium; Attendance: 1,500; Referee: Aleksandr Gauzer

21 May 2011 12	Shakhter Karagandy	4 – 2	Kairat	Karaganda
18:30 (UTC+6)	Baizhanov (yellow card) 3'; Khizhnichenko 8' (yellow card) 37'; Kukeyev 12' (pen.), 31' (pen.); Zhangylyshbay 90'; Soloshenko (yellow card) 90'	Report	Y.Goriachiy (yellow card) 6'; M.Muminov (yellow card) 8' (yellow-red card) 34'; Strukov 18'; Klimov (yellow card) 50'; Đorđević 90'	Stadium: Shakhter Stadium; Attendance: 5,000; Referee: Viktor Antonov

26 May 2011 13	Vostok	1 – 2	Shakhter Karagandy	Oskemen
18:00 (UTC+6)	S.Zhumakhanov 56' (yellow card) 87'; P.Udalov (yellow card) 68'	Report	Khizhnichenko 12', 44'	Stadium: Vostok Stadium; Attendance: 1,500; Referee: Aydin Rakhimbayev

8 June 2011 14	Zhetysu	1 – 0	Shakhter Karagandy	Taldykorgan
18:00 (UTC+6)	Bakayev 28' (pen.); Mihajlov (yellow card) 45'; V.Berikbayev (yellow card) 58'; Muzhikov (yellow card) 84'; Stepanenko (yellow card) 88'	Report	Baizhanov (yellow card) 40'; Vasiljević (yellow card) 45'; Khizhnichenko (yellow card) 45'; Utabayev (yellow card) 84'; Rašković (yellow card) 85'; Vičius (yellow card) 90'	Stadium: Zhetysu Stadium; Attendance: 2,500; Referee: Gennadiy Zhukovskiy

12 June 2011 15	Shakhter Karagandy	1 – 0	Aktobe	Karaganda
17:30 (UTC+6)	Rašković (yellow card) 15'; Finonchenko 49'; V.Borovskiy (yellow card) 62'	Report	Khairullin (yellow card) 90+2'	Stadium: Shakhter Stadium; Attendance: 6,000; Referee: Akmalkhan Kholmatov

16 June 2011 19	Shakhter Karagandy	2 – 0	Tobol	Karaganda
19:00 (UTC+6)	Khizhnichenko 55', 70'	Report		Stadium: Shakhter Stadium; Attendance: 13,000; Referee: Igor Khisamutdinov

19 June 2011 16	Taraz	0 – 1	Shakhter Karagandy	Taraz
18:00 (UTC+6)	Diakate (yellow card) 42'	Report	Khizhnichenko 19'; I.Shevchenko (yellow card) 36'; V.Borovskiy (red card) 46'	Stadium: Central Stadium; Attendance: 4,500; Referee: Anatolyi Vishnichenko

25 June 2011 17	Shakhter Karagandy	2 – 2	Ordabasy	Karaganda
18:00 (UTC+6)	A.Borantayev (yellow card) 30'; Utabayev (yellow card) 36'; Baizhanov 64' (pen.); Konysbayev (yellow card) 89'; Khizhnichenko 90+4'	Report	Irismetov (yellow card) 29' (yellow-red card) 86'; Nurgaliev 54' (pen.) (red card) 63'; Mukhtarov (yellow card) 68'; Yevstigneyev 72'; Kasyanov (yellow card) 89'	Stadium: Shakhter Stadium; Attendance: 10,000; Referee: Aydin Rakhimbayev

3 July 2011 18	Astana	2 – 0	Shakhter Karagandy	Astana
17:00 (UTC+6)	Zhumaskaliyev (yellow card) 40' (goal) 57'; Bogavac 60'	Report	Baizhanov (yellow card) 75'; A.Borantaev (yellow card) 90+2'	Stadium: Astana Arena; Attendance: 6,500; Referee: Kairat Slambekov

26 July 2011 21	Atyrau	1 – 4	Shakhter Karagandy	Atyrau
19:30 (UTC+6)	Travin (yellow card) 37'; Comvalius 63'; Nivaldo (yellow card) 78'; Trkulja (yellow card) 90+2'	Report	Khizhnichenko 13'; Finonchenko 24'; Kukeyev 33', 90+4'; Utabayev (yellow card) 83'	Stadium: Munaishy Stadium; Attendance: 4,000; Referee: Viktor Antonov

30 July 2011 22	Kaisar	0 – 1	Shakhter Karagandy	Kyzylorda
19:00 (UTC+6)	Semler (yellow card) 35'; Edeipo (yellow card) 56'	Report	Finonchenko (yellow card) 33'; Vasiljević 45'; Konysbayev (yellow card) 56'; Kirov (yellow card) 73'	Stadium: Gani Muratbayev Stadium; Attendance: 4,000; Referee: Igor Khisamutdinov

3 August 2011 20	Irtysh Pavlodar	2 – 1	Shakhter Karagandy	Pavlodar
19:00 (UTC+6)	A.Danayev 34'; Tleshev 53' (yellow card) 65'; Akhmetov (yellow card) 63'; F.Siminidi (yellow card) 88'	Report	Petronijević (yellow card) 23'; Finonchenko 26'; Đidić (yellow card) 88'	Stadium: Central Stadium; Attendance: 3,500; Referee: Pavel Saliy

===== League table =====
Pos	Team	Pld	W	D	L	GF	GA	GD	Pts	Qualification
1	Zhetysu	22	15	4	3	39	16	+23	49	Qualification for the championship group
2	Astana (Note: Astana began the season as "Lokomotiv Astana" before being renamed in May 2011.)	22	13	6	3	35	19	+16	45	Qualification for the championship group
3	Shakhter Karagandy	22	13	3	6	35	20	+15	42	Qualification for the championship group
4	Aktobe	22	12	5	5	39	19	+20	41	Qualification for the championship group
5	Irtysh Pavlodar	22	11	3	8	38	34	+4	36	Qualification for the championship group

Source: kff.kz (in Russian)
Rules for classification: 1st points; 2nd overall wins; 3rd goal difference; 4th goals scored. The winners of the 2011 Kazakhstan Cup competition will qualify for the second qualifying round of the UEFA Europa League.

==== Championship Round ====
===== Results =====
14 August 2011 23	Astana	1 – 2	Shakhter Karagandy	Astana
17:00 (UTC+6)	Bogavac 31' (pen.); Rozhkov (red card) 58'; Doroș (yellow card) 87'	Report	Khizhnichenko 29' (yellow card) 86'; Utabayev (yellow card) 30' (goal) 64'; Konysbayev (yellow card) 58'	Stadium: Astana Arena; Attendance: 9,000; Referee: Ruslan Duzmambetov

20 August 2011 24	Shakhter Karagandy	2 – 1	Aktobe	Karaganda
18:00 (UTC+6)	Finonchenko 50'; Kukeyev 57'	Report	Kostić (yellow card) 39' (goal) 67'; Chichulin (yellow card) 88'	Stadium: Shakhter Stadium; Attendance: 8,250; Referee: Aydin Rakhimbayev

25 August 2011 25	Shakhter Karagandy	2 – 2	Ordabasy	Karaganda
18:00 (UTC+6)	Finonchenko 17'; Kukeyev (yellow card) 25'; Khizhnichenko 61'; Frunză (yellow card) 86'; Utabayev (yellow card) 90' (yellow-red card) 90+1'	Report	Mukhtarov (yellow card) 25'; Ashirbekov 42', 88'; Yevstigneyev (yellow card) 84'; Nurgaliev (yellow card) 90'; Collins (yellow card) 90+1'	Stadium: Shakhter Stadium; Attendance: 6,000; Referee: Sergey Pasko

10 September 2011 26	Irtysh Pavlodar	2 – 1	Shakhter Karagandy	Pavlodar
19:00 (UTC+6)	K.Zarechniy (yellow card) 22'; Maltsev 36' (yellow card) 43'; Shabalin 43'; Chernyshov (yellow card) 60'; Tsirin (yellow card) 90+1'	Report	Finonchenko 14'; Konysbayev (yellow card) 42'; Baizhanov (yellow card) 67'	Stadium: Central Stadium; Attendance: 3,800; Referee: Akmalkhan Kholmatov

17 September 2011 27	Shakhter Karagandy	2 – 1	Zhetysu	Karaganda
17:00 (UTC+6)	Konysbayev 10' (yellow card) 57'; Kukeyev 83'; Mokin (yellow card) 90+3'	Report	Samchenko (yellow card) 2'; Shchotkin (yellow card) 23'; Muzhikov (yellow card) 67'; Bakayev 69'; Mihajlov (yellow card) 75'	Stadium: Shakhter Stadium; Attendance: 9,000; Referee: Akmalkhan Kholmatov

24 September 2011 28	Aktobe	1 – 1	Shakhter Karagandy	Aktobe
18:00 (UTC+6)	Y.Averchenko 80'	Report	Vasiljević 49'; Vičius (yellow card) 55' (yellow-red card) 67'; Mokin (yellow card) 90'	Stadium: Central Stadium; Attendance: 8,000; Referee: Ruslan Duzmambetov

30 September 2011 29	Ordabasy	0 – 0	Shakhter Karagandy	Shymkent
17:00 (UTC+6)	Yevstigneyev (yellow card) 48'; Mukhtarov (yellow card) 90'	Report	Baizhanov (yellow card) 80'	Stadium: Kazhymukan Munaitpasov Stadium; Attendance: 2,000; Referee: Akmalkhan Kholmatov

15 October 2011 30	Shakhter Karagandy	3 – 1	Irtysh Pavlodar	Karaganda
17:00 (UTC+6)	Đidić (yellow card) 16' (goal) 57'; Baizhanov (yellow card) 45'; S.Dosmanbetov 80'; Finonchenko 90+3'	Report	Daskalov 2'; Kuchma (yellow card) 45+1'; Ivanov (yellow card) 65'; Chernyshov (yellow card) 66'; A.Danayev (yellow card) 81'	Stadium: Shakhter Stadium; Attendance: 5,000; Referee: Aydin Rakhimbayev

22 October 2011 31	Zhetysu	0 – 2	Shakhter Karagandy	Taldykorgan
17:00 (UTC+6)	Skorykh (yellow card) 74'	Report	Finonchenko 24'; A.Borantaev 35'	Stadium: Zhetysu Stadium; Attendance: 5,850; Referee: Ruslan Duzmambetov

29 October 2011 10	Shakhter Karagandy	2 – 0	Astana	Karaganda
15:00 (UTC+6)	Khizhnichenko 18', 80'; Kukeyev (yellow card) 35'; Vasiljević (yellow card) 66'	Summary	Shomko (yellow card) 53'; Rozhkov (yellow card) 54'; Karpovich (yellow card) 66'; Bugaiov (yellow card) 69'; Shakhmetov (yellow card) 82'	Stadium: Shakhter Stadium; Attendance: 18,900; Referee: Kairat Slambekov

===== Table =====
Pos	Team	Pld	W	D	L	GF	GA	GD	Pts	Qualification or relegation
1	Shakhter Karagandy (C)	32	19	6	7	52	29	+23	42	Qualification for the Champions League second qualifying round
2	Zhetysu	32	19	5	8	51	27	+24	38	Qualification for the Europa League first qualifying round (Note: The winners of the 2011 Kazakhstan Cup competition will qualify for the first qualifying round of the UEFA Europa League.)
3	Aktobe	32	15	9	8	53	31	+22	34	Qualification for the Europa League first qualifying round
4	Astana (Note: Astana began the season as "Lokomotiv Astana" before being renamed in May 2011.)	32	16	7	9	50	37	+13	33	
5	Irtysh Pavlodar	32	15	5	12	50	50	0	32	

Source: kff.kz (in Russian)
Rules for classification: 1st points; 2nd overall wins; 3rd goal difference; 4th goals scored.
(C) Champions

=== Kazakhstan Cup ===
20 April 2011 Second Round	Kazakhmys	0 – 3	Shakhter Karagandy	Temirtau
17:00 (UTC+6)	E.Iskakov (yellow card) 78'; S.Yakushin (yellow card) 85'	Report	A.Borantaev 3' (pen.); Soloshenko (yellow card) 7'; Rašković (yellow card) 40' (goal) 43', 49'; Vičius (yellow card) 83'	Stadium: Metallurg Stadium; Attendance: 800; Referee: Aleksandr Gauzer

11 May 2011 Quarterfinal	Shakhter Karagandy	2 – 4	Taraz	Karaganda
15:00 (UTC+6)	Utabayev (yellow card) 4'; Vasiljević 26' (yellow card) 87'; Finonchenko 78'; I.Mangutkin (yellow card) 85'	Report	Pakholyuk 9' (yellow card) 85'; O.Nedashkovskiy 30'; Islamkhan 33'; Diakate (yellow card) 49'; R.Nurmukhametov (yellow card) 55'; Jovanović 60'; D.Yevstigneyev (yellow card) 87'	Stadium: Shakhter Stadium; Attendance: 4,000; Referee: Ruslan Duzmambetov

=== UEFA Europa League ===
==== Qualifying rounds ====
1 July 2011 First qualifying round 1st leg	Koper (Slovenia)	1 – 1	(Kazakhstan) Shakhter Karagandy	Koper, Slovenia
00:45 (UTC+6)	E.Handanagić (yellow card) 17'; Hasić (yellow card) 42'; Bubanja 84'; B.Djukić (yellow card) 90+3'	Report	Đidić (yellow card) 80'; Vasiljević (yellow card) 87'; Kukeyev 90+3' (pen.)	Stadium: Bonifika Stadium; Attendance: 2,500; Referee: Georgi Vadachkoria (Georgia)

7 July 2011 First qualifying round 2nd leg	Shakhter Karagandy (Kazakhstan)	2 – 1 (3 – 2 agg.)	(Slovenia) Koper	Karaganda, Kazakhstan
19:00 (UTC+6)	Kukeyev (yellow card) 37'; Konysbayev 45', 84' (yellow card) 56'; Finonchenko (yellow card) 63'; Rašković (yellow card) 90+3'	Report	Osterc 32' (yellow card) 90+4'; Hadžić (yellow card) 40'; B.Djukić (yellow card) 64'; E.Handanagić (yellow card) 69'	Stadium: Shakhter Stadium; Attendance: 10,000; Referee: Anastassios Kakos (Greece)

14 July 2011 Second qualifying round 1st leg	Shakhter Karagandy (Kazakhstan)	2 – 1	(Republic of Ireland) St Patrick's Athletic	Karaganda, Kazakhstan
19:00 (UTC+6)	Vasiljević 52', 86'; Finonchenko (yellow card) 65'; S.Dosmanbetov (yellow card) 90+4'	Report	D.McMillan 79'	Stadium: Shakhter Stadium; Attendance: 12,000; Referee: Kristo Tohver (Estonia)

22 July 2011 Second qualifying round 2nd leg	St Patrick's Athletic (Republic of Ireland)	2 – 0 (3 – 2 agg.)	(Kazakhstan) Shakhter Karagandy	Dublin, Republic of Ireland
00:45 (UTC+6)	E.McMillan 14'; Shortall (yellow card) 31'; Doyle (yellow card) 45+1' (goal) 70'; Bradley (yellow card) 82'; Kavanagh (yellow card) 90'	Report	Khizhnichenko (yellow card) 31'; Baizhanov (yellow card) 45+2'; Petronijević (yellow card) 61'; Konysbayev (yellow card) 78'; Đidić (yellow card) 80'	Stadium: Richmond Park; Attendance: 2,250; Referee: Sébastien Delferiere (Belgium)

== Squad statistics ==
As of match played 29 October 2011

=== Appearances and goals ===
No.	Pos	Nat	Player	Total		Premier League		Kazakhstan Cup		UEFA Europa League	
No.	Pos	Nat	Player	Apps	Goals	Apps	Goals	Apps	Goals	Apps	Goals
1	GK	(Kazakhstan) KAZ	Aleksandr Grigorenko	3	0	1	0	2	0	0	0
2	DF	(Kazakhstan) KAZ	Aleksandr Kirov	16	0	13	0	0	0	3	0
3	MF	(Lithuania) LTU	Gediminas Vičius	36	1	29+1	1	2	0	4	0
4	DF	(Bosnia and Herzegovina) BIH	Nikola Vasiljević	37	5	31	2	1+1	1	4	2
5	DF	(Kazakhstan) KAZ	Kairat Utabayev	33	1	27+1	1	1	0	4	0
6	MF	(Kazakhstan) KAZ	Ilnur Mangutkin	7	0	1+4	0	2	0	0	0
7	MF	(Kazakhstan) KAZ	Askhat Borantayev	29	4	18+7	3	2	1	1+1	0
8	FW	(Kazakhstan) KAZ	Serik Dosmanbetov	21	4	1+16	4	0	0	0+4	0
9	FW	(Serbia) SRB	Milanko Rašković	20	4	12+4	2	2	2	0+2	0
10	MF	(Kazakhstan) KAZ	Zhambyl Kukeyev	32	10	27	9	0+1	0	4	1
11	MF	(Kazakhstan) KAZ	Maksat Baizhanov	32	2	26+2	2	0	0	4	0
13	MF	(Kazakhstan) KAZ	Vadim Borovskiy	25	0	15+7	0	0+1	0	0+2	0
14	FW	(Kazakhstan) KAZ	Andrei Finonchenko	26	9	18+4	8	0+1	1	3	0
15	DF	(Kazakhstan) KAZ	Igor Soloshenko	2	0	1	0	1	0	0	0
17	DF	(Belarus) BLR	Andrey Paryvayew	11	0	11	0	0	0	0	0
18	FW	(Kazakhstan) KAZ	Ivan Shevchenko	3	0	2+1	0	0	0	0	0
19	DF	(Kazakhstan) KAZ	Yevgeny Tarasov	11	0	5+5	0	1	0	0	0
20	DF	(Bosnia and Herzegovina) BIH	Aldin Đidić	37	1	31	1	2	0	4	0
21	MF	(Kazakhstan) KAZ	Grigori Dubkov	4	0	3	0	1	0	0	0
22	DF	(Kazakhstan) KAZ	Arsen Tyulenev	2	0	0+2	0	0	0	0	0
23	MF	(Kazakhstan) KAZ	Ulan Konysbayev	15	3	11	1	0	0	4	2
25	FW	(Kazakhstan) KAZ	Toktar Zhangylyshbay	6	1	0+6	1	0	0	0	0
26	MF	(Kazakhstan) KAZ	Kanat Aliyev	10	1	3+5	1	2	0	0	0
28	MF	(Kazakhstan) KAZ	Akhat Zholshorin	3	0	0+2	0	1	0	0	0
35	GK	(Kazakhstan) KAZ	Aleksandr Mokin	35	0	31	0	0	0	4	0
40	DF	(Kazakhstan) KAZ	Fyodor Rudenko	1	0	1	0	0	0	0	0
77	MF	(Serbia) SRB	Dušan Petronijević	11	0	5+4	0	0	0	1+1	0
78	FW	(Moldova) MDA	Viorel Frunză	8	0	0+8	0	0	0	0	0
91	FW	(Kazakhstan) KAZ	Sergei Khizhnichenko	37	16	29+2	16	0+2	0	4	0
Players away from Shakhter Karagandy on loan:
Players who appeared for Shakhter Karagandy that left during the season:
23	MF	(Kazakhstan) KAZ	Vyacheslav Erbes	4	0	0+2	0	2	0	0	0

=== Goal scorers ===
Place	Position	Nation	Number	Name	Premier League	Kazakhstan Cup	UEFA Europa League	Total
1	FW	(Kazakhstan)	91	Sergei Khizhnichenko	16	0	0	16
2	MF	(Kazakhstan)	10	Zhambyl Kukeyev	9	0	1	10
3	FW	(Kazakhstan)	14	Andrei Finonchenko	8	1	0	9
4	DF	(Bosnia and Herzegovina)	4	Nikola Vasiljević	2	1	2	5
5	FW	(Kazakhstan)	8	Serik Dosmanbetov	4	0	0	4
5	FW	(Kazakhstan)	7	Askhat Borantaev	3	1	0	4
5	FW	(Serbia)	9	Milanko Rašković	2	2	0	4
8	MF	(Kazakhstan)	23	Ulan Konysbayev	1	0	2	3
9	MF	(Kazakhstan)	11	Maksat Baizhanov	2	0	0	2
10	DF	(Kazakhstan)	5	Kairat Utabayev	1	0	0	1
10	FW	(Kazakhstan)	25	Toktar Zhangylyshbay	1	0	0	1
10	MF	(Lithuania)	3	Gediminas Vičius	1	0	0	1
10	MF	(Kazakhstan)	26	Kanat Aliyev	1	0	0	1
10	DF	(Bosnia and Herzegovina)	20	Aldin Đidić	1	0	0	1
				TOTALS	52	5	5	62

=== Disciplinary record ===
Number	Nation	Position	Name	Premier League		Kazakhstan Cup		UEFA Europa League		Total	
Number	Nation	Position	Name	Yellow card	Red card	Yellow card	Red card	Yellow card	Red card	Yellow card	Red card
2	(Kazakhstan)	DF	Aleksandr Kirov	1	0	0	0	0	0	1	0
3	(Lithuania)	MF	Gediminas Vičius	4	1	1	0	0	0	5	1
4	(Bosnia and Herzegovina)	DF	Nikola Vasiljević	2	0	1	0	1	0	4	0
5	(Kazakhstan)	DF	Kairat Utabayev	11	1	1	0	0	0	12	1
6	(Kazakhstan)	MF	Ilnur Mangutkin	0	0	1	0	0	0	1	0
7	(Kazakhstan)	DF	Askhat Borantayev	4	0	0	0	0	0	4	0
8	(Kazakhstan)	FW	Serik Dosmanbetov	0	0	0	0	1	0	1	0
9	(Serbia)	FW	Milanko Rašković	4	0	1	0	1	0	6	0
10	(Kazakhstan)	MF	Zhambyl Kukeyev	3	0	0	0	1	0	4	0
11	(Kazakhstan)	MF	Maksat Baizhanov	8	0	0	0	1	0	9	0
13	(Kazakhstan)	MF	Vadim Borovskiy	2	1	0	0	0	0	2	1
14	(Kazakhstan)	FW	Andrei Finonchenko	3	0	0	0	2	0	5	0
15	(Kazakhstan)	DF	Igor Soloshenko	1	0	1	0	0	0	2	0
17	(Belarus)	DF	Andrey Paryvayew	1	0	0	0	0	0	1	0
18	(Kazakhstan)	FW	Ivan Shevchenko	1	0	0	0	0	0	1	0
20	(Bosnia and Herzegovina)	DF	Aldin Đidić	4	0	0	0	2	0	6	0
21	(Kazakhstan)	MF	Grigori Dubkov	1	0	0	0	0	0	1	0
23	(Kazakhstan)	MF	Ulan Konysbayev	5	0	0	0	2	0	7	0
35	(Kazakhstan)	GK	Aleksandr Mokin	3	0	0	0	0	0	3	0
77	(Serbia)	MF	Dušan Petronijević	1	0	0	0	1	0	2	0
78	(Moldova)	FW	Viorel Frunză	1	0	0	0	0	0	1	0
91	(Kazakhstan)	FW	Sergei Khizhnichenko	3	0	0	0	1	0	4	0
Players who left Shakhter Karagandy during the season:
			TOTALS	63	3	6	0	13	0	82	3
