= 2012 FC Shakhter Karagandy season =

FC Shakhter Karagandy
2012 season
- Chairman: Yerden Khalilin
- Manager: Viktor Kumykov
- Stadium: Shakhter Stadium
- Kazakhstan Premier League: 1st
- Kazakhstan Super Cup: Runners-Up
- Kazakhstan Cup: Semifinal vs Astana
- Champions League: Second qualifying round vs Slovan Liberec
- Top goalscorer: League: Gediminas Vičius (7); All: Zhambyl Kukeyev (8)
| Home colours | Away colours | Third colours |

The 2012 FC Shakhter Karagandy season was the 21st successive season that Shakhter played in the Kazakhstan Premier League, the highest tier of association football in Kazakhstan.

== Squad ==
As of match played 5 November 2012

| No. | Name | Nationality | Position | Date of birth (age) | Signed from | Signed in | Apps. | Goals |
Goalkeepers
| 1 | Aleksandr Grigorenko | (Kazakhstan) | GK | 6 February 1985 (aged 27) | Atyrau | 2007 | | |
| 16 | Marlene Imagambetov | (Kazakhstan) | GK | 15 September 1993 (aged 19) | Academy | 2012 | 0 | 0 |
| 31 | Serhiy Tkachuk | (Kazakhstan) | GK | 15 February 1992 (aged 20) | Dynamo Kyiv | 2011 | 2 | 0 |
| 35 | Aleksandr Mokin | (Kazakhstan) | GK | 6 February 1985 (aged 27) | Atyrau | 2011 | 66 | 0 |
Defenders
| 2 | Igor Soloshenko | (Kazakhstan) | DF | 22 May 1979 (aged 33) | Okzhetpes | 2011 | 4 | 0 |
| 4 | Nikola Vasiljević | (Bosnia and Herzegovina) | DF | 19 December 1983 (aged 28) | Zvijezda Gradačac | 2011 | 65 | 9 |
| 5 | Mikhail Gabyshev | (Kazakhstan) | DF | 2 January 1990 (aged 22) | Vostok | 2012 | 12 | 1 |
| 17 | Andrey Paryvayew | (Belarus) | DF | 3 January 1982 (aged 30) | Gorodeya | 2011 | 42 | 1 |
| 19 | Yevgeny Tarasov | (Kazakhstan) | DF | 16 April 1985 (aged 27) | Vostok | 2009 | 69 | 0 |
| 20 | Aldin Đidić | (Bosnia and Herzegovina) | DF | 30 August 1983 (aged 29) | Baltika Kaliningrad | 2010 | 100 | 12 |
| 21 | Aleksandr Kirov | (Kazakhstan) | DF | 4 September 1984 (aged 28) | Astana | 2011 | 44 | 1 |
| 24 | Arman Sahimov | (Kazakhstan) | DF | 4 January 1991 (aged 21) | Academy | 2010 | 0 | 0 |
| 28 | Marat Rakishev | (Kazakhstan) | DF | 8 March 1993 (aged 19) | Academy | 2012 | 0 | 0 |
| 33 | Vladlen Antoshchuk | (Kazakhstan) | DF | 25 May 1994 (aged 18) | Academy | 2012 | 0 | 0 |
| 37 | Alexander Zemtsov | (Kazakhstan) | DF | 23 March 1993 (aged 19) | Academy | 2012 | 0 | 0 |
| 38 | Alexander Nuykin | (Kazakhstan) | DF | 26 January 1992 (aged 20) | Academy | 2010 | 0 | 0 |
| 39 | Alexander Malyshev | (Kazakhstan) | DF | 25 February 1992 (aged 20) | Academy | 2010 | 0 | 0 |
| 43 | Dmitry Moiseev | (Kazakhstan) | DF | 30 March 1995 (aged 17) | Academy | 2012 | 0 | 0 |
| 49 | Artem Eletsky | (Kazakhstan) | DF | 26 November 1992 (aged 19) | Academy | 2011 | 0 | 0 |
| 85 | Fedor Rudenko | (Kazakhstan) | DF | 28 March 1990 (aged 22) | Academy | 2010 | 15 | 0 |
Midfielders
| 3 | Gediminas Vičius | (Lithuania) | MF | 5 July 1985 (aged 27) | FBK Kaunas | 2010 | 95 | 13 |
| 6 | Danijel Majkić | (Bosnia and Herzegovina) | MF | 16 December 1987 (aged 24) | Baltika Kaliningrad | 2012 | 10 | 2 |
| 7 | Askhat Borantayev | (Kazakhstan) | MF | 22 August 1978 (aged 34) | Kaisar | 2010 | 56 | 4 |
| 8 | Abylaihan Mahambetov | (Kazakhstan) | MF | 3 September 1991 (aged 21) | Okzhetpes | 2012 | 6 | 2 |
| 10 | Zhambyl Kukeyev | (Kazakhstan) | MF | 20 September 1988 (aged 24) | Lokomotiv Astana | 2011 | 63 | 17 |
| 11 | Maksat Baizhanov | (Kazakhstan) | MF | 6 August 1984 (aged 28) | Zhetysu | 2011 | 63 | 7 |
| 13 | Vadim Borovskiy | (Kazakhstan) | MF | 30 October 1986 (aged 26) | Atyrau | 2010 | 47 | 2 |
| 18 | Filip Arsenijević | (Serbia) | MF | 2 September 1983 (aged 29) | Jagodina | 2012 | 25 | 1 |
| 23 | Akhat Zholshorin | (Kazakhstan) | MF | 28 June 1992 (aged 20) | Academy | 2010 | 3 | 0 |
| 27 | Nursultan Zhusupov | (Kazakhstan) | MF | 22 January 1993 (aged 19) | Academy | 2011 | 0 | 0 |
| 41 | Anton Olenich | (Kazakhstan) | MF | 28 April 1995 (aged 17) | Academy | 2012 | 0 | 0 |
| 42 | Sergey Vetrov | (Kazakhstan) | MF | 11 November 1994 (aged 17) | Academy | 2011 | 0 | 0 |
| 44 | Kuanysh Ermekov | (Kazakhstan) | MF | 14 April 1994 (aged 18) | Academy | 2012 | 0 | 0 |
| 47 | Aslanbek Arshkenov | (Kazakhstan) | MF | 13 October 1993 (aged 19) | Academy | 2012 | 0 | 0 |
| 48 | Akzhol Amanzholov | (Kazakhstan) | MF | 1 March 1993 (aged 19) | Academy | 2011 | 0 | 0 |
| 88 | Roger Cañas | (Colombia) | MF | 27 March 1990 (aged 22) | Sibir Novosibirsk | 2012 | 32 | 4 |
| 99 | Erlan Turashbaev | (Kazakhstan) | MF | 16 September 1991 (aged 21) | Academy | 2012 | 0 | 0 |
Forwards
| 9 | Vitaliy Li | (Kazakhstan) | FW | 9 July 1992 (aged 20) | Kazakhmys | 2010 | 3 | 0 |
| 14 | Andrei Finonchenko | (Kazakhstan) | FW | 21 June 1982 (aged 30) | Academy | 2001 | 312 | 113 |
| 15 | Eduards Višņakovs | (Latvia) | FW | 10 May 1990 (aged 22) | Ventspils | 2012 | 16 | 4 |
| 25 | Toktar Zhangylyshbay | (Kazakhstan) | FW | 9 July 1992 (aged 20) | Academy | 2011 | 6 | 1 |
| 29 | Khamid Nurmukhametov | (Kazakhstan) | FW | 9 July 1992 (aged 20) | Academy | 2010 | 0 | 0 |
| 45 | Roman Murtazayev | (Kazakhstan) | FW | 10 September 1993 (aged 19) | Academy | 2012 | 1 | 1 |
| 50 | Evgeny Vorobyev | (Kazakhstan) | FW | 18 September 1993 (aged 19) | Academy | 2012 | 0 | 0 |
| 55 | Sergey Gridin | (Kazakhstan) | FW | 20 May 1987 (aged 25) | loan from Astana | 2012 | 13 | 0 |
| 77 | Stanislav Lunin | (Kazakhstan) | FW | 2 May 1993 (aged 19) | Vostok | 2012 | 20 | 3 |
| 84 | Galymzhan Abdikadirov | (Kazakhstan) | FW | 4 October 1992 (aged 20) | Academy | 2012 | 0 | 0 |
| 91 | Sergei Khizhnichenko | (Kazakhstan) | FW | 17 July 1991 (aged 21) | Lokomotiv Astana | 2011 | 50 | 19 |
Players away on loan
| 47 | Vladislav Akhmeyev | (Kazakhstan) | MF | 19 December 1992 (aged 19) | Academy | 2010 | 2 | 0 |
Players that left during the season
| 8 | Serik Dosmanbetov | (Kazakhstan) | FW | 8 March 1982 (aged 30) | Zhetysu | 2011 | 28 | 4 |
| 12 | Igor Pikalkin | (Kazakhstan) | MF | 19 March 1992 (aged 20) | Academy | 2010 | 17 | 2 |
| 16 | Khamit Magayev | (Kazakhstan) | GK | 10 June 1993 (aged 19) | Academy | 2011 | 0 | 0 |
| 26 | Vladislav Kuzmin | (Kazakhstan) | DF | 3 July 1987 (aged 25) | Ile-Saulet | 2012 | 1 | 0 |
| 36 | Yevgeny Krasikov | (Kazakhstan) | MF | 6 September 1991 (aged 21) | Academy | 2010 | 0 | 0 |

== Transfers ==
=== Winter ===
In: Note: Flags indicate national team as defined under FIFA eligibility rules; some limited exceptions apply. Players may hold more than one non-FIFA nationality.

| No. | Pos. | Nation | Player |
|---|---|---|---|
| 5 | DF | KAZ | Mikhail Gabyshev (from (Kazakhstan) Vostok) |
| 6 | MF | BIH | Danijel Majkić (from (Russia) Baltika Kaliningrad) |
| 18 | MF | SRB | Filip Arsenijević (from (Serbia) Jagodina) |
| 26 | DF | KAZ | Vladislav Kuzmin (from (Kazakhstan) Ile-Saulet) |
| 77 | FW | KAZ | Stanislav Lunin (from (Kazakhstan) Vostok) |
| 88 | MF | COL | Roger Cañas (from (Russia) Sibir Novosibirsk) |

Out: Note: Flags indicate national team as defined under FIFA eligibility rules; some limited exceptions apply. Players may hold more than one non-FIFA nationality.

| No. | Pos. | Nation | Player |
|---|---|---|---|
| 5 | DF | KAZ | Kairat Utabayev (to (Kazakhstan) Irtysh Pavlodar) |
| 6 | MF | KAZ | Ilnur Mangutkin (to (Kazakhstan) Astana 1964) |
| 9 | FW | SRB | Milanko Rašković (to (Kazakhstan) Akzhayik) |
| 18 | DF | KAZ | Ivan Shevchenko (to (Kazakhstan) Kairat) |
| 21 | MF | KAZ | Grigori Dubkov (to (Kazakhstan) Bolat) |
| 22 | DF | KAZ | Arsen Tyulenov |
| 23 | MF | KAZ | Ulan Konysbayev (loan return to (Kazakhstan) Astana) |
| 29 | DF | KAZ | Ayan Kusaynov (to (Kazakhstan) Kazakhmys) |
| 30 | GK | KAZ | Igor Shatskiy (to (Kazakhstan) Astana-1964) |
| 32 | MF | KAZ | Stanislav Vasilyev |
| 34 | MF | KAZ | Nursultan Ganiyev |
| 35 | MF | KAZ | Sergey Kodzhebash |
| 37 | MF | KAZ | Zhomart Rsalin |
| 37 | FW | KAZ | Daniyar Zhankin |
| 41 | DF | KAZ | Pavel Lunyov |
| 43 | FW | KAZ | Aidos Tattybayev (to (Kazakhstan) Bolat) |
| 47 | MF | KAZ | Vladislav Ahmeev |
| 49 | DF | KAZ | Artem Eletsky |
| 77 | MF | SRB | Dušan Petronijević (to (Kazakhstan) Astana) |
| 78 | FW | MDA | Viorel Frunză (to (Moldova) Veris Chișinău) |

=== Summer ===
In: Note: Flags indicate national team as defined under FIFA eligibility rules; some limited exceptions apply. Players may hold more than one non-FIFA nationality.

| No. | Pos. | Nation | Player |
|---|---|---|---|
| 8 | FW | KAZ | Abylaihan Mahambetov (from (Kazakhstan) Okzhetpes) |
| 15 | FW | LAT | Eduards Višņakovs (from (Latvia) Ventspils) |
| 55 | FW | KAZ | Sergey Gridin (loan from (Kazakhstan) Astana) |

Out: Note: Flags indicate national team as defined under FIFA eligibility rules; some limited exceptions apply. Players may hold more than one non-FIFA nationality.

| No. | Pos. | Nation | Player |
|---|---|---|---|
| 6 | MF | BIH | Danijel Majkić |
| 8 | FW | KAZ | Serik Dosmanbetov (to (Kazakhstan) Kaisar) |
| 12 | MF | KAZ | Igor Pikalkin |
| 16 | GK | KAZ | Khamit Magayev |
| 26 | DF | KAZ | Vladislav Kuzmin (to (Kazakhstan) Atyrau) |
| 36 | MF | KAZ | Yevgeny Krasikov |

== Competitions ==
=== Kazakhstan Super Cup ===
| 6 March 2012 | Ordabasy | 1 – 0 | Shakhter Karagandy | Astana |
| 19:00 (UTC+6) | Arouri (yellow card) 53'; Ashirbekov 58'; Trajković (yellow card) 86' | Summary | Paryvayew (yellow card) 54'; Vasiljević (yellow card) 60'; Cañas (yellow card) 84' | Stadium: Astana Arena; Attendance: 12,000; Referee: Ruslan Duzmambetov |

=== Kazakhstan Premier League ===
==== Results summary ====
| Overall | | | | | | | | Home | | | | | | Away | | | | | |
| Pld | W | D | L | GF | GA | GD | Pts | W | D | L | GF | GA | GD | W | D | L | GF | GA | GD |
|---|---|---|---|---|---|---|---|---|---|---|---|---|---|---|---|---|---|---|---|
| 26 | 17 | 2 | 7 | 48 | 15 | +33 | 53 | 10 | 1 | 2 | 32 | 6 | +26 | 7 | 1 | 5 | 16 | 9 | +7 |

Last updated: 28 October 2012.
Source: Soccerway

==== Results ====
| 10 March 2012 1 | Irtysh Pavlodar | 1 – 0 | Shakhter Karagandy | Pavlodar |
| 15:00 (UTC+6) | Strukov 6'; Bakayev (yellow card) 28'; Shomko (yellow card) 39'; Coulibaly (yellow card) 70' | Summary | Vasiljević (yellow card) 31'; Arsenijević (yellow card) 35' | Stadium: Central Stadium; Attendance: 6,500; Referee: Pavel Saliy |

| 18 March 2012 2 | Shakhter Karagandy | 2 – 0 | Aktobe | Astana |
| 17:00 (UTC+6) | Vasiljević (yellow card) 61'; Khizhnichenko 69'; Vičius 80' | Summary | Logvinenko (yellow card) 15'; Smakov (yellow card) 56' | Stadium: Astana Arena; Attendance: 1,000; Referee: Igor Khisamutdinov |

| 25 March 2012 3 | Tobol | 3 – 1 | Shakhter Karagandy | Kostanay |
| 14:00 (UTC+6) | Kantsavy (yellow card) 38' (goal) 49'; Dzholchiyev 58', 87' | Summary | Paryvayew (yellow card) 71'; Baizhanov 81' | Stadium: Stadion Zatobolets; Attendance: 4,000; Referee: Kairat Slambekov |

| 1 April 2012 4 | Shakhter Karagandy | 5 – 1 | Zhetysu | Astana |
| 17:00 (UTC+6) | Đidić 8'; Cañas 23', 48', 70'; Paryvayew (yellow card) 26'; Finonchenko 42'; Vasiljević (yellow card) 49' | Summary | Junuzović (yellow card) 15'; Nurgaliev 41' | Stadium: Astana Arena; Attendance: 1,500; Referee: Aydin Rakhimbayev |

| 8 April 2012 5 | Okzhetpes | 0 – 2 | Shakhter Karagandy | Kokshetau |
| 15:00 (UTC+6) | | Summary | Majkić (yellow card) 21'; Arsenijević 75'; Finonchenko 90' | Stadium: Okzhetpes Stadium; Attendance: 2,500; Referee: Viktor Antonov |

| 15 April 2012 6 | Shakhter Karagandy | 1 – 0 | Taraz | Temirtau |
| 17:00 (UTC+6) | Vičius 54'; Cañas (yellow card) 80'; Paryvayew (yellow card) 83' | Summary | A.Shabaev (yellow card) 60'; Islamkhan (yellow card) 67'; Y.Kenbaev (yellow card) 86'; Kuchma (yellow card) 90' | Stadium: Metallurg Stadium; Attendance: 3,000; Referee: Akmalkhan Kholmatov |

| 22 April 2012 7 | Atyrau | 0 – 2 | Shakhter Karagandy | Atyrau |
| 18:00 (UTC+6) | M.Semenov (yellow card) 90+5' | Summary | Đidić (yellow card) 30'; Khizhnichenko 45'; Finonchenko 69' | Stadium: Munaishy Stadium; Attendance: 1,500; Referee: Marat Iskakov |

| 29 April 2012 8 | Shakhter Karagandy | 1 – 1 | Ordabasy | Temirtau |
| 17:00 (UTC+6) | Khizhnichenko (yellow card) 24'; Đidić (yellow card) 78'; Vasiljević 89' | Summary | Kasyanov (yellow card) 45'; Gueye 54'; Tazhimbetov (yellow card) 76'; Karpovich (yellow card) 78' | Stadium: Metallurg Stadium; Attendance: 3,000; Referee: Igor Aleshin |

| 6 May 2012 9 | Astana | 1 – 0 | Shakhter Karagandy | Astana |
| 15:00 (UTC+6) | Rozhkov 12'; Dmitrenko (yellow card) 56' | Summary | Đidić (yellow card) 12'; Finonchenko (yellow card) 37' | Stadium: Astana Arena; Attendance: 6,000; Referee: Aydin Rakhimbayev |

| 12 May 2012 10 | Shakhter Karagandy | 3 – 1 | Akzhayik | Karaganda |
| 15:00 (UTC+6) | Kukeyev 22', 74' (pen.); Vičius 90+1' | Summary | Zyankovich 4' (yellow card) 88'; K.Aliyev (yellow card) 55'; K.Zotov (yellow card) 73' | Stadium: Shakhter Stadium; Attendance: 5,500; Referee: Marat Iskakov |

| 20 May 2012 11 | Sunkar | 0 – 2 | Shakhter Karagandy | Almaty |
| 17:30 (UTC+6) | T.Moldagaliev (yellow card) 29'; Cvetković (yellow card) 50' | Summary | Kirov (yellow card) 11'; Finonchenko (yellow card) 82' (goal) 85'; Kukeyev 90+3' | Stadium: Dynamo Stadium; Attendance: 1,000; Referee: Ruslan Duzmambetov |

| 27 May 2012 12 | Shakhter Karagandy | 4 – 1 | Kairat | Karaganda |
| 17:00 (UTC+6) | Khizhnichenko 1'; Finonchenko 38', 45+1'; Lunin 47' | Summary | O.Nedashkovsky 9' (yellow card) 62'; K.Shestakov (yellow card) 44' | Stadium: Shakhter Stadium; Attendance: 6,000; Referee: Pavel Saliy |

| 16 June 2012 13 | Kaisar | 1 – 0 | Shakhter Karagandy | Kyzylorda |
| 18:00 (UTC+6) | Marković 55'; A.Anarmetov (yellow card) 63'; Crnogorac (yellow card) 80'; Abdulin (yellow card) 84' | Summary | Đidić (yellow card) 64'; Finonchenko (yellow card) 80' | Stadium: Gani Muratbayev Stadium; Attendance: 4,000; Referee: Viktor Antonov |

| 24 June 2012 14 | Aktobe | 1 – 0 | Shakhter Karagandy | Aktobe |
| 20:00 (UTC+6) | Geynrikh 7'; Logvinenko (yellow card) 80' Sidelnikov (yellow card) 80' | Summary | Kukeyev (yellow card) 50'; A.Mahambetov (yellow card) 75'; Cañas (yellow card) 80' | Stadium: Central Stadium; Attendance: 9,000; Referee: Igor Khisamutdinov |

| 1 July 2012 15 | Shakhter Karagandy | 3 – 0 | Tobol | Karaganda |
| 18:00 (UTC+6) | Baizhanov 27'; Šljivić 57' (o.g.); Finonchenko (yellow card) 72'; Vasiljević 86' | Summary | Kantsavy (yellow card) 72'; Bugaiov (red card) 76' | Stadium: Shakhter Stadium; Attendance: 9,000; Referee: Oleg Sokolov |

| 9 July 2012 16 | Zhetysu | 1 – 5 | Shakhter Karagandy | Taldykorgan |
| 19:00 (UTC+6) | Kirov 15' (o.g.) | Summary | Lunin 9'; Paryvayew (yellow card) 14'; Mihajlov 43' (o.g.); Y.Tarasov (yellow card) 62'; Vičius 68'; Višņakovs 88'; A.Mahambetov 90' | Stadium: Zhetysu Stadium; Attendance: 1,000; Referee: Kairat Slambekov |

| 29 July 2012 18 | Taraz | 1 – 1 | Shakhter Karagandy | Taraz |
| 18:30 (UTC+6) | D.Evstigneev (yellow card) 12'; Odita 85' | Summary | A.Borantayev (yellow card) 53'; Lunin (yellow card) 63'; Baizhanov 90+1' | Stadium: Central Stadium; Attendance: 3,500; Referee: Sergey Gorokhovodatskiy |

| 5 August 2012 19 | Shakhter Karagandy | 4 – 0 | Atyrau | Karaganda |
| 18:00 (UTC+6) | Vičius 11', 27'; Lunin 22'; Vasiljević 83' | Summary | Rodionov (yellow card) 21' | Stadium: Shakhter Stadium; Attendance: 5,000; Referee: Igor Khisamutdinov |

| 10 August 2012 17 | Shakhter Karagandy | 4 – 0 | Okzhetpes | Karaganda |
| 18:00 (UTC+6) | Višņakovs 3'; Kukeyev 35'; Đidić 45'; A.Mahambetov 50'; V.Li (yellow card) 90+2' | Summary | Milovanović (yellow card) 44' | Stadium: Shakhter Stadium; Attendance: 3,000; Referee: Sergey Pasko |

| 19 August 2012 20 | Ordabasy | 0 – 1 | Shakhter Karagandy | Shymkent |
| 18:00 (UTC+6) | | Summary | Finonchenko (yellow card) 63'; Višņakovs 72' | Stadium: Kazhymukan Munaitpasov Stadium; Attendance: 3,500; Referee: Oleg Sokolov |

| 26 August 2012 21 | Shakhter Karagandy | 0 – 1 | Astana | Karaganda |
| 18:00 (UTC+6) | A.Makhambetov (yellow card) 41'; Gridin (yellow card) 55'; Paryvayew (yellow card) 62'; V.Li (yellow card) 73' | Summary | Rozhkov (yellow card) 49'; Nusserbayev 67'; Ivanovski (yellow card) 86'; Kéthévoama (yellow card) 90+2' | Stadium: Shakhter Stadium; Attendance: 8,000; Referee: Kairat Slambekov |

| 15 September 2012 22 | Akzhayik | 0 – 1 | Shakhter Karagandy | Oral |
| 17:00 (UTC+6) | Chleboun (yellow card) 39'; Sadjo (yellow card) 85' | Summary | M.Gabyshev (yellow card) 16'; Y.Tarasov (yellow card) 50'; Baizhanov (yellow card) 62'; Kukeyev 72' | Stadium: Petr Atoyan Stadium; Attendance: 4,000; Referee: Sergey Pasko |

| 23 September 2012 23 | Shakhter Karagandy | 2 – 0 | Sunkar | Karaganda |
| 17:00 (UTC+6) | Paryvayew 3'; Cañas (yellow card) 62'; Vičius 67' | Summary | O.Sabirov (yellow card) 57' | Stadium: Shakhter Stadium; Attendance: 4,000; Referee: Oleg Sokolov |

| 4 October 2012 24 | Kairat | 0 – 1 | Shakhter Karagandy | Almaty |
| 18:00 (UTC+6) | Souto (yellow card) 1' | Summary | Vasiljević (yellow card) 33' (goal) 63'; Paryvayew (yellow card) 85'; Gridin (yellow card) 90+2' | Stadium: Central Stadium; Attendance: 7,000; Referee: Ruslan Duzmambetov |

| 21 October 2012 25 | Shakhter Karagandy | 3 – 0 | Kaisar | Karaganda |
| 14:30 (UTC+6) | Baizhanov 50', 52'; Kukeyev 80' (yellow card) 80' | Summary | | Stadium: Shakhter Stadium; Attendance: 12,000; Referee: Oleg Sokolov |

| 28 October 2012 26 | Shakhter Karagandy | 0 – 1 | Irtysh Pavlodar | Karaganda |
| 18:00 (UTC+6) | Cañas (yellow card) 81' | Summary | Bakayev 7'; Ivanov (yellow card) 8' | Stadium: Shakhter Stadium; Attendance: 5,000; Referee: Aleksandr Gauzer |

==== League table ====
| Pos | Team | Pld | W | D | L | GF | GA | GD | Pts | Qualification or relegation |
|---|---|---|---|---|---|---|---|---|---|---|
| 1 | Shakhter Karagandy (C) | 26 | 17 | 2 | 7 | 48 | 15 | +33 | 53 | Qualification for the Champions League second qualifying round |
| 2 | Irtysh Pavlodar | 26 | 15 | 6 | 5 | 46 | 20 | +26 | 51 | Qualification for the Europa League first qualifying round |
| 3 | Aktobe | 26 | 15 | 5 | 6 | 44 | 22 | +22 | 50 | Qualification for the Europa League first qualifying round |
| 4 | Taraz | 26 | 14 | 4 | 8 | 32 | 30 | +2 | 46 | |
| 5 | Astana | 26 | 13 | 7 | 6 | 34 | 24 | +10 | 46 | Qualification for the Europa League first qualifying round (Note: Astana qualified for the first qualifying round of the 2013–14 UEFA Europa League as winner of 2012 Kazakhstan Cup.) |

Source: FFK (in Russian)
Rules for classification: 1st points;
Two team tiebreak: 1st overall wins; 2nd head-to-head record; 3rd goals difference; 4th goals scored; 5th away goals scored;
Multiple teams tiebreak: 1st overall wins; 2nd goals difference; 3rd goals scored; 4th away goals scored
(C) Champions

=== Kazakhstan Cup ===
| 16 May 2012 First Round | Spartak Semey | 0 – 2 | Shakhter Karagandy | Semey |
| 17:00 (UTC+6) | | Report | Kukeyev 24'; Finonchenko 35' | Stadium: Spartak Stadium |

| 20 June 2012 Second Round 1st leg | CSKA Almaty | 0 – 4 | Shakhter Karagandy | Almaty |
| 17:00 (UTC+6) | R.Pavinich (yellow card) 31'; B.Onzhan (yellow card) 39' | Summary | Majkić 56'; I.Pikalkin 57' (yellow card) 87'; Đidić 76'; Baizhanov (yellow card) 76'; V.Borovskiy 79'; Y.Tarasov (yellow card) 81' | Stadium: CSKA Stadium; Attendance: 100; Referee: Askhat Abdanbayev |

| 27 June 2012 Second Round 2nd leg | Shakhter Karagandy | 3 – 0 (7 – 0 agg.) | CSKA Almaty | Karaganda |
| (UTC+6) | Murtazayev 34'; Majkić 72' (yellow card) 72'; V.Borovskiy 85' (pen.) | Summary | Z.Zhaksylykov (yellow card) 85' | Stadium: Shakhter Stadium; Attendance: 1,500; Referee: Denis Tevyashov |

| 19 September 2012 Quarterfinal 1st leg | Zhetysu | 1 – 1 | Shakhter Karagandy | Taldykorgan |
| 18:00 (UTC+6) | Dyakov (yellow card) 48'; Mihajlov 56' (pen.); Kostić (yellow card) 75' | Summary | Cañas 76' (pen.) | Stadium: Zhetysu Stadium; Attendance: 2,500; Referee: Igor Khisamutdinov |

| 29 September 2012 Quarterfinal 2nd leg | Shakhter Karagandy | 1 – 0 (2 – 1 agg.) | Zhetysu | Karaganda |
| 18:00 (UTC+6) | M.Gabyshev 2' (yellow card) 39' | Summary | Junuzović (yellow card) 74' | Stadium: Shakhter Stadium; Attendance: 4,000; Referee: Igor Aleshin |

| 1 November 2012 Semi Final 1st Leg | Shakhter Karagandy | 2 – 1 | Astana | Karagandy |
| 15:00 (UTC+6) | Đidić (yellow card) 61'; Kirov 66'; Višņakovs 72'; Cañas (yellow card) 73'; Paryvayew (yellow card) 77' | Summary | Đidić 56' (o.g.); Konysbayev (yellow card) 61' | Stadium: Shakhter Stadium; Attendance: 2,000; Referee: Kairat Slambekov |

| 5 November 2012 Semi Final 2nd Leg | Astana | 2 – 0 (3 – 2 agg.) | Shakhter Karagandy | Astana |
| 17:00 (UTC+6) | Rozhkov 41'; Kéthévoama 57' | Summary | Đidić (yellow card) 37'; Paryvayew (yellow card) 83'; Y.Tarasov (yellow card) 85' | Stadium: Astana Arena; Attendance: 2,500; Referee: Ruslan Duzmambetov |

=== UEFA Champions League ===
==== Qualifying rounds ====
| 17 July 2012 Second qualifying round 1st leg | Slovan Liberec (Czech Republic) | 1 – 0 | (Kazakhstan) Shakhter Karagandy | Liberec, Czech Republic |
| 21:00 (UTC+6) | Hadaščok 23'; Vácha (yellow card) 65'; Bosančić (yellow card) 88' | Report | Baizhanov (yellow card) 8'; Vasiljević (yellow card) 40'; Đidić (yellow card) 60' | Stadium: Stadion u Nisy; Attendance: 5,500; Referee: Aleksei Eskov (Russia) |

| 24 July 2012 Second qualifying round 2nd leg | Shakhter Karagandy (Kazakhstan) | 1 – 1 (a.e.t.) (1 – 2 agg.) | (Czech Republic) Slovan Liberec | Karaganda, Kazakhstan |
| 19:00 (UTC+6) | Kukeyev 40' (pen.) (yellow card) 51'; Vasiljević (yellow card) 56' | Report | Fleišman (yellow card) 39'; Janů (yellow card) 67'; Blažek 120' | Stadium: Shakhtyor Stadium; Attendance: 15,000; Referee: Kenn Hansen (Denmark) |

== Squad statistics ==
As of match played 5 November 2012

=== Appearances and goals ===
| No. | Pos | Nat | Player | Total | | Premier League | | Kazakhstan Cup | | Champions League | | Kazakhstan Super Cup | |
| No. | Pos | Nat | Player | Apps | Goals | Apps | Goals | Apps | Goals | Apps | Goals | Apps | Goals |
|---|---|---|---|---|---|---|---|---|---|---|---|---|---|
| 1 | GK | (Kazakhstan) KAZ | Aleksandr Grigorenko | 4 | 0 | 1+1 | 0 | 2 | 0 | 0 | 0 | 0 | 0 |
| 2 | DF | (Kazakhstan) KAZ | Igor Soloshenko | 2 | 0 | 0 | 0 | 1+1 | 0 | 0 | 0 | 0 | 0 |
| 3 | MF | (Lithuania) LTU | Gediminas Vičius | 29 | 7 | 20+3 | 7 | 2+1 | 0 | 2 | 0 | 1 | 0 |
| 4 | DF | (Bosnia and Herzegovina) BIH | Nikola Vasiljević | 28 | 4 | 23 | 4 | 2 | 0 | 2 | 0 | 1 | 0 |
| 5 | DF | (Kazakhstan) KAZ | Mikhail Gabyshev | 12 | 1 | 7+3 | 0 | 2 | 1 | 0 | 0 | 0 | 0 |
| 7 | MF | (Kazakhstan) KAZ | Askhat Borantayev | 10 | 0 | 4+3 | 0 | 2+1 | 0 | 0 | 0 | 0 | 0 |
| 8 | FW | (Kazakhstan) KAZ | Abylaihan Mahambetov | 6 | 2 | 1+5 | 2 | 0 | 0 | 0 | 0 | 0 | 0 |
| 9 | FW | (Kazakhstan) KAZ | Vitaliy Li | 3 | 0 | 0+2 | 0 | 0+1 | 0 | 0 | 0 | 0 | 0 |
| 10 | MF | (Kazakhstan) KAZ | Zhambyl Kukeyev | 31 | 7 | 23+1 | 6 | 3+1 | 1 | 2 | 0 | 1 | 0 |
| 11 | MF | (Kazakhstan) KAZ | Maksat Baizhanov | 31 | 5 | 14+10 | 5 | 4 | 0 | 1+1 | 0 | 1 | 0 |
| 13 | MF | (Kazakhstan) KAZ | Vadim Borovskiy | 7 | 2 | 1+2 | 0 | 2+1 | 2 | 0 | 0 | 1 | 0 |
| 14 | FW | (Kazakhstan) KAZ | Andrei Finonchenko | 25 | 7 | 18+2 | 6 | 2 | 1 | 2 | 0 | 1 | 0 |
| 15 | FW | (Latvia) LAT | Eduards Višņakovs | 16 | 4 | 3+9 | 3 | 1+1 | 1 | 0+2 | 0 | 0 | 0 |
| 17 | MF | (Belarus) BLR | Andrey Paryvayew | 31 | 1 | 23+1 | 1 | 4 | 0 | 2 | 0 | 1 | 0 |
| 18 | MF | (Serbia) SRB | Filip Arsenijević | 25 | 1 | 12+7 | 1 | 3+1 | 0 | 2 | 0 | 0 | 0 |
| 19 | DF | (Kazakhstan) KAZ | Yevgeni Tarasov | 20 | 0 | 12+3 | 0 | 2+1 | 0 | 0+2 | 0 | 0 | 0 |
| 20 | DF | (Bosnia and Herzegovina) BIH | Aldin Đidić | 31 | 3 | 24 | 2 | 4 | 1 | 2 | 0 | 1 | 0 |
| 21 | DF | (Kazakhstan) KAZ | Aleksandr Kirov | 28 | 1 | 22 | 0 | 2+1 | 1 | 2 | 0 | 1 | 0 |
| 31 | GK | (Kazakhstan) KAZ | Serhiy Tkachuk | 2 | 0 | 0 | 0 | 0+2 | 0 | 0 | 0 | 0 | 0 |
| 35 | GK | (Kazakhstan) KAZ | Aleksandr Mokin | 31 | 0 | 25 | 0 | 3 | 0 | 2 | 0 | 1 | 0 |
| 45 | FW | (Kazakhstan) KAZ | Roman Murtazayev | 1 | 1 | 0 | 0 | 1 | 1 | 0 | 0 | 0 | 0 |
| 55 | FW | (Kazakhstan) KAZ | Sergey Gridin | 13 | 0 | 8+2 | 0 | 1 | 0 | 2 | 0 | 0 | 0 |
| 77 | FW | (Kazakhstan) KAZ | Stanislav Lunin | 20 | 3 | 13+2 | 3 | 2+2 | 0 | 0 | 0 | 0+1 | 0 |
| 88 | MF | (Colombia) COL | Roger Cañas | 32 | 4 | 21+5 | 3 | 3 | 1 | 1+1 | 0 | 0+1 | 0 |
| 91 | FW | (Kazakhstan) KAZ | Sergei Khizhnichenko | 13 | 3 | 9+3 | 3 | 0 | 0 | 0 | 0 | 1 | 0 |
Players away on loan:
Players who appeared for Shakhter Karagandy that left during the season:
| 6 | MF | (Bosnia and Herzegovina) BIH | Danijel Majkić | 10 | 2 | 2+4 | 0 | 4 | 2 | 0 | 0 | 0 | 0 |
| 8 | FW | (Kazakhstan) KAZ | Serik Dosmanbetov | 7 | 0 | 0+5 | 0 | 1 | 0 | 0 | 0 | 0+1 | 0 |
| 12 | MF | (Kazakhstan) KAZ | Igor Pikalkin | 2 | 1 | 0 | 0 | 2 | 1 | 0 | 0 | 0 | 0 |
| 26 | DF | (Kazakhstan) KAZ | Vladislav Kuzmin | 1 | 0 | 0 | 0 | 1 | 0 | 0 | 0 | 0 | 0 |

=== Goal scorers ===
| Place | Position | Nation | Number | Name | Premier League | Kazakhstan Cup | Champions League | Kazakhstan Super Cup | Total |
|---|---|---|---|---|---|---|---|---|---|
| 1 | MF | (Kazakhstan) | 10 | Zhambyl Kukeyev | 6 | 1 | 1 | 0 | 8 |
| 2 | MF | (Lithuania) | 3 | Gediminas Vičius | 7 | 0 | 0 | 0 | 7 |
| 2 | FW | (Kazakhstan) | 14 | Andrei Finonchenko | 6 | 1 | 0 | 0 | 7 |
| 4 | MF | (Kazakhstan) | 11 | Maksat Baizhanov | 5 | 0 | 0 | 0 | 5 |
| 5 | DF | (Bosnia and Herzegovina) | 4 | Nikola Vasiljević | 4 | 0 | 0 | 0 | 4 |
| 5 | MF | (Colombia) | 88 | Roger Cañas | 3 | 1 | 0 | 0 | 4 |
| 5 | FW | (Latvia) | 15 | Eduards Višņakovs | 3 | 1 | 0 | 0 | 4 |
| 8 | FW | (Kazakhstan) | 77 | Stanislav Lunin | 3 | 0 | 0 | 0 | 3 |
| 8 | FW | (Kazakhstan) | 91 | Sergei Khizhnichenko | 3 | 0 | 0 | 0 | 3 |
| 8 | DF | (Bosnia and Herzegovina) | 20 | Aldin Đidić | 2 | 1 | 0 | 0 | 3 |
| 11 | FW | (Kazakhstan) | 8 | Abylaihan Mahambetov | 2 | 0 | 0 | 0 | 2 |
| 11 | | | | Own goal | 2 | 0 | 0 | 0 | 2 |
| 11 | MF | (Bosnia and Herzegovina) | 6 | Danijel Majkić | 0 | 2 | 0 | 0 | 2 |
| 11 | MF | (Kazakhstan) | 13 | Vadim Borovskiy | 0 | 2 | 0 | 0 | 2 |
| 14 | DF | (Belarus) | 17 | Andrey Paryvayew | 1 | 0 | 0 | 0 | 1 |
| 14 | MF | (Serbia) | 18 | Filip Arsenijević | 1 | 0 | 0 | 0 | 1 |
| 14 | MF | (Kazakhstan) | | Igor Pikalkin | 0 | 1 | 0 | 0 | 1 |
| 14 | MF | (Kazakhstan) | 45 | Roman Murtazaev | 0 | 1 | 0 | 0 | 1 |
| 14 | DF | (Kazakhstan) | 5 | Mikhail Gabyshev | 0 | 1 | 0 | 0 | 1 |
| 14 | DF | (Kazakhstan) | 21 | Aleksandr Kirov | 0 | 1 | 0 | 0 | 1 |
| | | | | TOTALS | 48 | 13 | 1 | 0 | 62 |

=== Disciplinary record ===
| Number | Nation | Position | Name | Premier League | | Kazakhstan Cup | | Champions League | | Kazakhstan Super Cup | | Total | |
| Number | Nation | Position | Name | Yellow card | Red card | Yellow card | Red card | Yellow card | Red card | Yellow card | Red card | Yellow card | Red card |
| 4 | (Bosnia and Herzegovina) | DF | Nikola Vasiljević | 4 | 0 | 0 | 0 | 2 | 0 | 1 | 0 | 7 | 0 |
| 5 | (Kazakhstan) | DF | Mikhail Gabyshev | 1 | 0 | 0 | 0 | 0 | 0 | 0 | 0 | 1 | 0 |
| 6 | (Bosnia and Herzegovina) | MF | Danijel Majkić | 1 | 0 | 0 | 0 | 0 | 0 | 0 | 0 | 1 | 0 |
| 7 | (Kazakhstan) | MF | Askhat Borantayev | 1 | 0 | 0 | 0 | 0 | 0 | 0 | 0 | 1 | 0 |
| 8 | (Kazakhstan) | FW | Abylaihan Mahambetov | 2 | 0 | 0 | 0 | 0 | 0 | 0 | 0 | 2 | 0 |
| 9 | (Kazakhstan) | FW | Vitaliy Li | 2 | 0 | 0 | 0 | 0 | 0 | 0 | 0 | 2 | 0 |
| 10 | (Kazakhstan) | MF | Zhambyl Kukeyev | 2 | 0 | 0 | 0 | 1 | 0 | 0 | 0 | 3 | 0 |
| 11 | (Kazakhstan) | MF | Maksat Baizhanov | 1 | 0 | 0 | 0 | 1 | 0 | 0 | 0 | 2 | 0 |
| 14 | (Kazakhstan) | FW | Andrei Finonchenko | 5 | 0 | 0 | 0 | 0 | 0 | 0 | 0 | 5 | 0 |
| 17 | (Belarus) | MF | Andrey Paryvayew | 6 | 0 | 0 | 0 | 0 | 0 | 1 | 0 | 7 | 0 |
| 18 | (Serbia) | MF | Filip Arsenijević | 1 | 0 | 0 | 0 | 0 | 0 | 0 | 0 | 1 | 0 |
| 19 | (Kazakhstan) | DF | Yevgeny Tarasov | 2 | 0 | 0 | 0 | 0 | 0 | 0 | 0 | 2 | 0 |
| 20 | (Bosnia and Herzegovina) | MF | Aldin Đidić | 4 | 0 | 0 | 0 | 1 | 0 | 0 | 0 | 5 | 0 |
| 21 | (Kazakhstan) | DF | Aleksandr Kirov | 1 | 0 | 0 | 0 | 0 | 0 | 0 | 0 | 1 | 0 |
| 55 | (Kazakhstan) | FW | Sergey Gridin | 2 | 0 | 0 | 0 | 0 | 0 | 0 | 0 | 2 | 0 |
| 77 | (Kazakhstan) | FW | Stanislav Lunin | 1 | 0 | 0 | 0 | 0 | 0 | 0 | 0 | 1 | 0 |
| 88 | (Colombia) | MF | Roger Cañas | 4 | 0 | 0 | 0 | 0 | 0 | 1 | 0 | 5 | 0 |
| 91 | (Kazakhstan) | FW | Sergei Khizhnichenko | 1 | 0 | 0 | 0 | 0 | 0 | 0 | 0 | 1 | 0 |
| | | | TOTALS | 41 | 0 | 0 | 0 | 5 | 0 | 3 | 0 | 49 | 0 |
