= 2013 FC Shakhter Karagandy season =

FC Shakhter Karagandy
2013 season
- Chairman: Yerden Khalilin
- Manager: Viktor Kumykov
- Stadium: Shakhter Stadium
- Kazakhstan Premier League: 5th
- Kazakhstan Super Cup: Winner
- Kazakhstan Cup: Winner
- Champions League: Play-off round vs Celtic
- Europa League: Group Stage
- Top goalscorer: League: Two Players (6); All: Andrei Finonchenko (11)
Home colours	Away colours	Third colours

The 2013 FC Shakhter Karagandy season was the 22nd successive season that Shakhter played in the Kazakhstan Premier League, the highest tier of association football in Kazakhstan.

== Squad ==
As of match played 12 December 2013

No.	Name	Nationality	Position	Date of birth (age)	Signed from	Signed in	Apps.	Goals
Goalkeepers
1	Stas Pokatilov	(Kazakhstan)	GK	8 December 1992 (aged 21)	Akzhayik	2013	12	0
16	Marlene Imagambetov	(Kazakhstan)	GK	15 September 1993 (aged 20)	Academy	2012	0	0
30	Alexander Zarutsky	(Kazakhstan)	GK	26 August 1993 (aged 20)	Academy	2013	1	0
31	Serhiy Tkachuk	(Kazakhstan)	GK	15 February 1992 (aged 21)	Dynamo Kyiv	2011	9	0
35	Aleksandr Mokin	(Kazakhstan)	GK	6 February 1985 (aged 28)	Atyrau	2011	100	0
55	Kirill Vysotsky	(Kazakhstan)	GK	17 January 1994 (aged 19)	Academy	2013	0	0
Defenders
4	Nikola Vasiljević	(Bosnia and Herzegovina)	DF	19 December 1983 (aged 29)	Zvijezda Gradačac	2011	97	10
17	Andrey Paryvayew	(Belarus)	DF	3 January 1982 (aged 31)	Gorodeya	2011	79	2
19	Yevgeny Tarasov	(Kazakhstan)	DF	16 April 1985 (aged 28)	Vostok	2009	104	6
20	Aldin Đidić	(Bosnia and Herzegovina)	DF	30 August 1983 (aged 30)	Baltika Kaliningrad	2010	130	15
22	Mikhail Gabyshev	(Kazakhstan)	DF	2 January 1990 (aged 23)	Vostok	2012	30	3
25	Serhiy Malyi	(Kazakhstan)	DF	5 June 1990 (aged 23)	Arsenal Bila Tserkva	2013	35	0
27	Bakyt Abuov	(Kazakhstan)	DF	24 January 1989 (aged 24)		2013	8	0
34	Ilya Pogibelko	(Kazakhstan)	DF	29 January 1995 (aged 18)	Academy	2010	2	0
38	Alexander Nuykin	(Kazakhstan)	DF	26 January 1992 (aged 21)	Academy	2010	0	0
39	Alexander Malyshev	(Kazakhstan)	DF	25 February 1992 (aged 21)	Academy	2010	0	0
42	Dmitry Zverev	(Kazakhstan)	DF	28 May 1993 (aged 20)	Academy	2013	2	0
43	Dmitry Moiseev	(Kazakhstan)	DF	30 March 1995 (aged 18)	Academy	2013	0	0
49	Yuri Kustov	(Kazakhstan)	DF	21 January 1996 (aged 17)	Academy	2013	0	0
50	Alexander Goncharov	(Kazakhstan)	DF	23 March 1995 (aged 18)	Academy	2013	0	0
51	Aybar Kozhenov	(Kazakhstan)	DF	17 February 1994 (aged 19)	Academy	2013	0	0
87	Aleksandar Simčević	(Serbia)	DF	15 February 1987 (aged 26)	Mordovia Saransk	2013	40	2
Midfielders
3	Gediminas Vičius	(Lithuania)	MF	5 July 1985 (aged 28)	FBK Kaunas	2010	131	14
5	Askhat Borantayev	(Kazakhstan)	MF	22 August 1978 (aged 35)	Kaisar	2010	72	4
7	Maksat Baizhanov	(Kazakhstan)	MF	6 August 1984 (aged 29)	Zhetysu	2011	106	9
13	Vadim Borovskiy	(Kazakhstan)	MF	30 October 1986 (aged 27)	Atyrau	2010	59	3
24	Aslan Darabayev	(Kazakhstan)	MF	21 January 1989 (aged 24)	Atyrau	2013	18	0
28	Gevorg Ghazaryan	(Armenia)	MF	5 April 1988 (aged 25)	loan from Metalurh Donetsk	2013	17	0
32	Nursultan Zhusupov	(Kazakhstan)	MF	22 January 1993 (aged 20)	Academy	2011	0	0
33	Akhat Zholshorin	(Kazakhstan)	MF	28 June 1992 (aged 21)	Academy	2010	6	1
41	Anton Olenich	(Kazakhstan)	MF	28 April 1995 (aged 18)	Academy	2012	0	0
44	Kuanysh Ermekov	(Kazakhstan)	MF	14 April 1994 (aged 19)	Academy	2012	0	0
46	Timur Zhakupov	(Kazakhstan)	MF	6 September 1995 (aged 18)	Academy	2013	0	0
47	Aslanbek Arshkenov	(Kazakhstan)	MF	13 October 1993 (aged 20)	Academy	2012	0	0
48	Akzhol Amanzholov	(Kazakhstan)	MF	1 March 1993 (aged 20)	Academy	2011	0	0
52	Vladislav Akhmeyev	(Kazakhstan)	MF	19 December 1992 (aged 20)	Academy	2010	6	0
88	Roger Cañas	(Colombia)	MF	27 March 1990 (aged 23)	Sibir Novosibirsk	2012	75	10
Forwards
11	Toktar Zhangylyshbay	(Kazakhstan)	FW	9 July 1992 (aged 21)	Academy	2011	20	2
14	Andrei Finonchenko	(Kazakhstan)	FW	21 June 1982 (aged 31)	Academy	2001	352	124
29	Khamid Nurmukhametov	(Kazakhstan)	FW	9 July 1992 (aged 21)	Academy	2010	1	0
40	Evgeny Vorobyev	(Kazakhstan)	FW	18 September 1993 (aged 20)	Academy	2012	0	0
45	Roman Murtazayev	(Kazakhstan)	FW	10 September 1993 (aged 20)	Academy	2012	24	6
53	Alibek Nurmagambetov	(Kazakhstan)	FW	20 September 1994 (aged 19)	Academy	2012	3	0
77	Stanislav Lunin	(Kazakhstan)	FW	2 May 1993 (aged 20)	Vostok	2012	39	3
78	Ihar Zyankovich	(Belarus)	FW	17 September 1987 (aged 25)	Akzhayik	2013	31	8
91	Sergei Khizhnichenko	(Kazakhstan)	FW	17 July 1991 (aged 22)	Lokomotiv Astana	2011	86	29
Players away on loan
8	Borut Semler	(Slovenia)	MF	25 February 1985 (aged 28)	Akzhayik	2013	5	0
9	Vitaliy Li	(Kazakhstan)	FW	9 July 1992 (aged 21)	Kazakhmys	2010	5	0
18	Daurenbek Tazhimbetov	(Kazakhstan)	FW	2 July 1985 (aged 28)	Ordabasy	2013	19	4
21	Vladimir Sedelnikov	(Kazakhstan)	DF	15 October 1991 (aged 22)	Tobol	2013	0	0
23	Valery Fomichev	(Belarus)	GK	23 March 1988 (aged 25)	Dynamo Brest	2013	0	0
Players that left during the season
10	Zhambyl Kukeyev	(Kazakhstan)	MF	20 September 1988 (aged 25)	Lokomotiv Astana	2011	73	18
15	Eduards Višņakovs	(Latvia)	FW	10 May 1990 (aged 22)	Ventspils	2012	25	5

Note: Flags indicate national team as defined under FIFA eligibility rules; some limited exceptions apply. Players may hold more than one non-FIFA nationality.

No.	Pos.	Nation	Player
11	FW	KAZ	Toktar Zhangylyshbai
14	FW	KAZ	Andrei Finonchenko
45	FW	KAZ	Roman Murtazayev
77	FW	KAZ	Stanislav Lunin
78	FW	BLR	Ihar Zyankovich
91	FW	KAZ	Sergei Khizhnichenko

== Transfers ==
=== Winter ===
In: Note: Flags indicate national team as defined under FIFA eligibility rules; some limited exceptions apply. Players may hold more than one non-FIFA nationality.

No.	Pos.	Nation	Player
8	FW	SLO	Borut Semler (from (Kazakhstan) Akzhayik)
18	FW	KAZ	Daurenbek Tazhimbetov (from (Kazakhstan) Ordabasy)
21	DF	KAZ	Vladimir Sedelnikov (from (Kazakhstan) Tobol)
23	GK	BLR	Valery Fomichev (from (Belarus) Dinamo Brest)
25	DF	UKR	Serhiy Malyi (from (Ukraine) Arsenal Bila Tserkva)
87	DF	SRB	Aleksandar Simčević (from (Russia) Mordovia Saransk)

Out: Note: Flags indicate national team as defined under FIFA eligibility rules; some limited exceptions apply. Players may hold more than one non-FIFA nationality.

No.	Pos.	Nation	Player
1	GK	KAZ	Aleksandr Grigorenko (to (Kazakhstan) Ordabasy)
2	DF	KAZ	Igor Soloshenko (to (Kazakhstan) Okzhetpes)
6	MF	BIH	Danijel Majkić (to (Bosnia and Herzegovina) Velež Mostar)
18	MF	SRB	Filip Arsenijević (to (Serbia) Jagodina)
21	DF	KAZ	Aleksandr Kirov (to (Kazakhstan) Astana)

=== Summer ===
In: Note: Flags indicate national team as defined under FIFA eligibility rules; some limited exceptions apply. Players may hold more than one non-FIFA nationality.

No.	Pos.	Nation	Player
1	GK	KAZ	Stas Pokatilov (from (Kazakhstan) Akzhayik)
24	MF	KAZ	Aslan Darabayev (to (Kazakhstan) Atyrau)
28	MF	ARM	Gevorg Ghazaryan (loan from (Ukraine) Metalurh Donetsk)
78	FW	BLR	Ihar Zyankovich (loan from (Kazakhstan) Akzhayik)

Out: Note: Flags indicate national team as defined under FIFA eligibility rules; some limited exceptions apply. Players may hold more than one non-FIFA nationality.

No.	Pos.	Nation	Player
8	FW	SLO	Borut Semler (loan to (Kazakhstan) Kaisar)
10	MF	KAZ	Zhambyl Kukeyev (to (Kazakhstan) Kairat)
15	FW	LAT	Eduards Višņakovs (to (Poland) Widzew Łódź)
18	FW	KAZ	Daurenbek Tazhimbetov (loan to (Kazakhstan) Astana)
21	DF	KAZ	Vladimir Sedelnikov (loan to (Kazakhstan) Astana-1964)
23	GK	BLR	Valery Fomichev (to (Turkey) Orduspor)
—	MF	KAZ	Vitaly Lee (loan to (Kazakhstan) Kairat)

== Competitions ==
=== Kazakhstan Super Cup ===
3 March 2013	Shakhter Karagandy	3 – 2 (a.e.t.)	Astana	Astana
17:00 (UTC+6)	Baizhanov 58'; Cañas (yellow card) 65'; Paryvayew 58' (yellow card) 110'; Malyi (yellow card) 104'; Kukeyev 118' (yellow card) 1118'	Summary	Kéthévoama 63'; Ostapenko 90'; Nusserbayev (yellow card) 120+1'	Stadium: Astana Arena; Attendance: 11,200; Referee: Igor Khisamutdinov

=== Kazakhstan Premier League ===
==== Regular season ====
===== Results summary =====
Overall								Home						Away					
Pld	W	D	L	GF	GA	GD	Pts	W	D	L	GF	GA	GD	W	D	L	GF	GA	GD
22	10	5	7	31	23	+8	35	9	0	2	24	9	+15	1	5	5	7	14	−7

Last updated: 6 November 2014.
Source: Soccerway

===== Results by round =====
Round	1	2	3	4	5	6	7	8	9	10	11	12	13	14	15	16	17	18	19	20	21	22
Ground																						
Result																						
Position																						

Source: Soccerway
A = Away; H = Home; W = Win; D = Draw; L = Loss

===== Results =====
9 March 2013 1	Akzhayik	3 – 0	Shakhter Karagandy	Oral
15:00 (UTC+6)	E.Kostrub (yellow card) 11'; Zyankovich 20', 35'; Sadjo (yellow card) 51'; Chleboun (yellow card) 81'; B.Omarov 83'	Summary	Paryvayew (yellow card) 41'; Simčević (yellow card) 78'	Stadium: Petr Atoyan Stadium; Attendance: 4,000; Referee: Aleksandr Gauzer

15 March 2013 2	Aktobe	3 – 1	Shakhter Karagandy	Aktobe
16:00 (UTC+6)	Bikmaev (yellow card) 17'; D.Miroshnichenko (yellow card) 18' (yellow-red card) 39'; Geynrikh 37', 75' (yellow card) 63'; Khairullin 58' (pen.)	Summary	Cañas 15'; Malyi (red card) 30'; Simčević (yellow card) 41'; Finonchenko (yellow card) 63'; Paryvayew (yellow card) 72'; S.Lunin (yellow card) 81'	Stadium: Central Stadium; Attendance: 3,000; Referee: Ruslan Duzmambetov

30 March 2013 3	Shakhter Karagandy	2 – 1	Irtysh Pavlodar	Temirtau
14:00 (UTC+6)	Tazhimbetov 80'; Finonchenko 81'	Summary	Strukov 24'	Stadium: Metallurg Stadium; Attendance: 5,000; Referee: Anatolyi Vishnichenko

6 April 2013 4	Zhetysu	0 – 0	Shakhter Karagandy	Taldykorgan
16:00 (UTC+6)	Y.Averchenko (yellow card) 4'; Melziddinov (yellow card) 53'; A.Totay (yellow card) 77'; Klimavičius (yellow card) 90'	Summary	Baizhanov (yellow card) 64'; A.Borantayev (yellow card) 73'	Stadium: Zhetysu Stadium; Attendance: 4,000; Referee: Viktor Antonov

14 April 2013 5	Shakhter Karagandy	1 – 3	Astana	Temirtau
16:00 (UTC+6)	Baizhanov (yellow card) 12'; Khizhnichenko 45+2'; Paryvayew (yellow card) 45+2'; Simčević (yellow card) 84'	Summary	Nurdauletov 7'; Erić (yellow card) 28'; Ostapenko 44'; Shakhmetov (yellow card) 58'; Korobkin 66' (yellow card) 75'; Dmitrenko (yellow card) 87'	Stadium: Metallurg Stadium; Attendance: 3,000; Referee: Igor Aleshin

20 April 2013 6	Atyrau	1 – 0	Shakhter Karagandy	Atyrau
16:00 (UTC+6)	Rodionov (yellow card) 11'; Samchenko (yellow card) 18'; Kutsov (yellow card) 59'; Pacholuk 90+3'	Summary	Tazhimbetov (yellow card) 11'; Malyi (yellow card) 72'	Stadium: Munaishy Stadium; Attendance: 4,500; Referee: Bolat Karlibayev

24 April 2013 7	Shakhter Karagandy	3 – 0	Taraz	Temirtau
17:30 (UTC+6)	Tarasov 40' (yellow card) 65'; Vičius 48'; Khizhnichenko (yellow card) 60'; Tazhimbetov 78'; Vasiljević (yellow card) 83'; Cañas (yellow card) 86'	Summary	Diakate (yellow card) 35'; S.Bauyrzhan (yellow card) 59'; Y.Akhmetov (yellow card) 81'; K.Zarechniy (yellow card) 88'	Stadium: Metallurg Stadium; Attendance: 3,000; Referee: Igor Khisamutdinov

28 April 2013 8	Tobol	1 – 2	Shakhter Karagandy	Kostanay
17:00 (UTC+6)	Kuchma (yellow card) 20'; Kurgulin (yellow card) 41'; Bugaiov (yellow card) 66'; Šljivić (yellow card) 72'; Dzholchiyev 84'	Summary	Paryvayew (yellow card) 11'; Tarasov 19'; Khizhnichenko 61'; Murtazayev (yellow card) 78'; Vičius (yellow card) 83'	Stadium: Central Stadium; Attendance: 3,700; Referee: Sergey Gorokhovodatskiy

5 May 2013 9	Shakhter Karagandy	2 – 1	Kairat	Temirtau
17:30 (UTC+6)	Vasiljević (yellow card) 23'; Finonchenko 57'; Khizhnichenko 67'; Tarasov (yellow card) 72'	Summary	Kislitsyn (yellow card) 23'; Knežević (yellow card) 26'; R.Sariev (yellow card) 35'; Shestakov (yellow card) 53'; Gorman (yellow card) 75'; T.Baizhanov 83'	Stadium: Metallurg Stadium; Attendance: 3,000; Referee: Askhat Abdanbayev

11 May 2013 10	Ordabasy	0 – 0	Shakhter Karagandy	Shymkent
17:00 (UTC+6)	T.Adyrbekov (yellow card) 41' (yellow-red card) 59'	Summary	Vičius (yellow card) 44'; Vasiljević (yellow card) 86'	Stadium: Kazhymukan Munaitpasov Stadium; Attendance: 5,000; Referee: Viktor Antonov

18 May 2013 11	Shakhter Karagandy	2 – 0	Vostok	Karaganda
17:30 (UTC+6)	Tarasov 12'; Vasiljević (yellow card) 44'; Cañas 81'; Vičius (yellow card) 83'	Summary	Sohna (yellow card) 43'; Nesterenko (yellow card) 85'	Stadium: Shakhter Stadium; Attendance: 5,500; Referee: Denis Izmailov

22 May 2013 12	Shakhter Karagandy	1 – 2	Aktobe	Karaganda
18:30 (UTC+6)	Đidić (yellow card) 23'; Tarasov (yellow card) 46'; Tazhimbetov (yellow card) 65'; Cañas (yellow card) 75'; Višņakovs 80'	Summary	Geynrikh 2', 49' (yellow card) 43'; Primus (yellow card) 66'; Kharabara (yellow card) 90+2'	Stadium: Shakhter Stadium; Attendance: 5,000; Referee: Igor Aleshin

26 May 2013 13	Irtysh Pavlodar	2 – 2	Shakhter Karagandy	Pavlodar
15:00 (UTC+6)	Bakayev (yellow card) 26'; A.Ayaganov 41'; Shabalin 69'	Summary	Finonchenko 3'; Khizhnichenko 66'; Tarasov (yellow card) 46'	Stadium: Central Stadium; Attendance: 5,000; Referee: Marat Iskakov

30 May 2013 14	Shakhter Karagandy	1 – 0	Zhetysu	Karaganda
18:30 (UTC+6)	Cañas 30' (pen.); Finonchenko (yellow card) 67'	Summary	Z.Korobov (yellow card) 30'; Perić (yellow card) 67'; Klimavičius (yellow card) 67'	Stadium: Shakhter Stadium; Attendance: 5,000; Referee: Bolat Karlibayev

14 June 2013 15	Astana	1 – 0	Shakhter Karagandy	Astana
18:00 (UTC+6)	Shakhmetov (yellow card) 21'; Kojašević (yellow card) 56'; Țîgîrlaș (yellow card) 59'; Ivanovski 83'	Summary	Simčević (yellow card) 49'	Stadium: Astana Arena; Attendance: 4,000; Referee: Anatolyi Vishnichenko

23 June 2013 16	Shakhter Karagandy	3 – 2	Atyrau	Karaganda
17:30 (UTC+6)	Đidić 8'; T.Zhangylyshbai (yellow card) 30'; Tazhimbetov 50'; Zyankovich 74'; Vičius (yellow card) 88'; Tarasov (red card) 90+1'	Summary	Rodionov (yellow card) 32'; A.Nurybekov (yellow card) 55' (goal) 81'; V.Chureyev 59'; Injac (yellow card) 64'; Abdulin (yellow card) 86'	Stadium: Shakhter Stadium; Attendance: 4,000; Referee: Igor Chesnokov

29 June 2013 17	Taraz	2 – 1	Shakhter Karagandy	Taraz
18:00 (UTC+6)	D.Evstigneev (yellow card) 24' (red card) 90+2'; Kozhamberdi 86', 90+4' (yellow card) 88'	Summary	S.Lunin (yellow card) 76'; Vasiljević 90+3'	Stadium: Central Stadium; Attendance: 3,800; Referee: Marat Iskakov

6 July 2013 18	Shakhter Karagandy	2 – 0	Tobol	Karaganda
18:30 (UTC+6)	Murtazayev (yellow card) 38'; Cañas 55'; Zyankovich 75' (pen.); Paryvayew (yellow card) 87'	Summary	Zhumaskaliyev (yellow card) 33'; Tonev (yellow card) 75'	Stadium: Shakhter Stadium; Attendance: 5,000; Referee: Denis Izmailov

13 July 2013 19	Kairat	1 – 1	Shakhter Karagandy	Almaty
19:30 (UTC+6)	Yedigaryan (yellow card) 70'; Kislitsyn 90' (yellow card) 90'	Summary	Khizhnichenko 15'; V.Borovskiy (yellow card) 40'; Finonchenko (yellow card) 73'; M.Gabyshev (yellow card) 81'	Stadium: Central Stadium; Attendance: 7,500; Referee: Anatolyi Vishnichenko

19 July 2013 20	Shakhter Karagandy	3 – 0	Ordabasy	Karaganda
18:00 (UTC+6)		Summary		Stadium: Shakhter Stadium; Attendance: 6,000; Referee: Igor Khisamutdinov

27 July 2013 21	Vostok	0 – 0	Shakhter Karagandy	Oskemen
18:00 (UTC+6)	A.Dzhanuzakov (yellow card) 53'; Niang (yellow card) 60'; Bakr (yellow card) 69'	Summary	V.Borovskiy (yellow card) 55'; M.Gabyshev (yellow card) 78'	Stadium: Vostok Stadium; Attendance: 1,200; Referee: Aleksandr Aliyev

3 August 2013 22	Shakhter Karagandy	4 – 0	Akzhayik	Karaganda
17:30 (UTC+6)	Murtazayev 43', 88'; M.Gabyshev 55'; Zyankovich 87'	Summary		Stadium: Shakhter Stadium; Attendance: 4,000; Referee: Denis Izmailov

===== League table =====
Pos	Team	Pld	W	D	L	GF	GA	GD	Pts	Qualification
1	Aktobe	22	14	5	3	30	12	+18	47	Qualification for the championship round
2	Astana	22	12	5	5	35	24	+11	41	Qualification for the championship round
3	Shakhter Karagandy	22	10	5	7	31	23	+8	35	Qualification for the championship round
4	Irtysh Pavlodar	22	9	7	6	24	20	+4	34	Qualification for the championship round
5	Kairat	22	7	10	5	28	24	+4	31	Qualification for the championship round

Source: FFK (in Russian)
Rules for classification: 1st points;
Two team tiebreak: 1st overall wins; 2nd head-to-head record; 3rd goals difference; 4th goals scored; 5th away goals scored;
Multiple teams tiebreak: 1st overall wins; 2nd goals difference; 3rd goals scored; 4th away goals scored

==== Championship round ====
===== Results summary =====
Overall								Home						Away					
Pld	W	D	L	GF	GA	GD	Pts	W	D	L	GF	GA	GD	W	D	L	GF	GA	GD
10	2	2	6	12	22	−10	8	1	1	3	6	8	−2	1	1	3	6	14	−8

Last updated: 5 November 2015.
Source: Soccerway

===== Results by round =====
Round	1	2	3	4	5	6	7	8	9	10
Ground	A	H	A	H	A	A	H	A	H	H
Result	W	D	L	L	D	L	W	L	L	L
Position										

Source: Soccerway
A = Away; H = Home; W = Win; D = Draw; L = Loss

===== Results =====
17 August 2013 23	Astana	1 – 2	Shakhter Karagandy	Astana
17:00 (UTC+6)	Nusserbayev 71'; Twumasi (yellow card) 90'	Summary	V.Borovskiy (yellow card) 23'; Murtazayev 50'; Finonchenko 75'; B.Abuov (yellow card) 78'	Stadium: Astana Arena; Attendance: 3,000; Referee: Anatolyi Vishnichenko

24 August 2013 24	Shakhter Karagandy	1 – 1	Irtysh Pavlodar	Karaganda
17:00 (UTC+6)	Darabayev (yellow card) 13'; Tarasov 33'	Summary	Govedarica (yellow card) 7' (yellow-red card) 89'; K.Begalyn 37'; Chernyshov (yellow card) 68'; G.Suyumbayev (yellow card) 70'	Stadium: Shakhter Stadium; Attendance: 6,500; Referee: Askhat Abdanbayev

1 September 2013 25	Ordabasy	4 – 0	Shakhter Karagandy	Shymkent
17:00 (UTC+6)	Arouri 9'; Nurgaliev (yellow card) 17' (goal) 49', 55'; Ashirbekov 80'	Summary	Paryvayew (yellow card) 21'; Baizhanov (yellow card) 41'	Stadium: Kazhymukan Munaitpasov Stadium; Attendance: 3,500; Referee: Alkesandr Gauzer

14 September 2013 26	Shakhter Karagandy	0 – 1	Aktobe	Karaganda
17:00 (UTC+6)	Đidić (yellow card) 26'; Tarasov (yellow card) 76'	Summary	Gridin 61'; P.Badlo (yellow card) 63'	Stadium: Shakhter Stadium; Attendance: 6,500; Referee: Akmalkhan Kholmatov

22 September 2013 27	Kairat	3 – 3	Shakhter Karagandy	Almaty
18:00 (UTC+6)	Ceesay 33'; V.Li 36'; Yedigaryan 56'; Duff (yellow card) 69'; Loria (yellow card) 72'; Michalík (yellow card) 87'	Summary	A.Borantayev (yellow card) 16'; Finonchenko 83', 88'; Baizhanov (yellow card) 85'; Zyankovich 90+3'	Stadium: Central Stadium; Attendance: 11,000; Referee: Anatolyi Vishnichenko

29 September 2013 28	Irtysh Pavlodar	2 – 1	Shakhter Karagandy	Pavlodar
17:00 (UTC+6)	Chichulin 77'; Bakayev (yellow card) 86'; Murzoev 88' (yellow card) 88'	Summary	A.Borantayev (yellow card) 57'; A.Zholshorin 70'	Stadium: Central Stadium; Attendance: 3,800; Referee: Ruslan Duzmambetov

6 October 2013 29	Shakhter Karagandy	3 – 0	Ordabasy	Karaganda
17:00 (UTC+6)	Đidić 35'; Zyankovich 59'; Malyi (yellow card) 77'; M.Gabyshev 80'	Summary	Irismetov (yellow card) 26'; Junuzović (yellow card) 38'; T.Adyrbekov (yellow card) 55'; Nurgaliev (yellow card) 71'	Stadium: Shakhter Stadium; Attendance: 3,500; Referee: Askhat Abdanbayev

19 October 2013 30	Aktobe	4 – 0	Shakhter Karagandy	Aktobe
17:00 (UTC+6)	Khairullin 13'; A.Tagybergen (yellow card) 30'; P.Badlo 50'; S.Lisenkov (yellow card) 71'; Aimbetov 84'; Kapadze 89'	Summary	Zyankovich (yellow card) 47'; D.Zverev (yellow card) 55'; M.Gabyshev (yellow card) 90+3'	Stadium: Central Stadium; Attendance: 10,000; Referee: Sergey Gorokhovodatskiy

27 October 2013 31	Shakhter Karagandy	1 – 2	Kairat	Karaganda
15:00 (UTC+6)	Zyankovich 25' (pen.); Malyi (yellow card) 46'	Summary	Knežević 19', 73'; Ceesay (yellow card) 25'; Yedigaryan (yellow card) 43'; Shestakov (yellow card) 72'	Stadium: Shakhter Stadium; Attendance: 3,500; Referee: Ruslan Duzmambetov

2 November 2013 32	Shakhter Karagandy	1 – 4	Astana	Karaganda
15:00 (UTC+6)	V.Borovskiy 13'; Darabayev (yellow card) 42'; S.Lunin (yellow card) 43'	Summary	Cícero 15'; Zelão (yellow card) 33'; Y.Goriachiy (yellow card) 41'; Nusserbayev 49'; Twumasi 62'; Konysbayev 66'	Stadium: Shakhter Stadium; Attendance: 1,600; Referee: Viktor Antonov

===== League table =====
Pos	Team	Pld	W	D	L	GF	GA	GD	Pts	Qualification
1	Aktobe (C)	32	20	6	6	46	22	+24	43	Qualification for the Champions League second qualifying round
2	Astana	32	19	5	8	54	35	+19	42	Qualification for the Europa League first qualifying round
3	Kairat	32	12	12	8	44	38	+6	33	Qualification for the Europa League first qualifying round
4	Irtysh Pavlodar	32	12	8	12	41	39	+2	27	
5	Shakhter Karagandy	32	12	7	13	43	45	−2	26	Qualification for the Europa League first qualifying round (Note: Shakter qualified for the 2014–15 UEFA Europa League first qualifying round by winning the 2013 Kazakhstan Cup.)
6	Ordabasy	32	11	8	13	33	34	−1	23	

Source: Soccerway
Rules for classification: 1st points;
Two team tiebreak: 1st overall wins; 2nd head-to-head record; 3rd goals difference; 4th goals scored; 5th away goals scored;
Multiple teams tiebreak: 1st overall wins; 2nd goals difference; 3rd goals scored; 4th away goals scored.
(C) Champions

=== Kazakhstan Cup ===
10 April 2013 First Round	BIIK	2 – 3	Shakhter Karagandy	Shymkent
(UTC+6)	Makhambetov 54' (yellow card) 55'; Pernebayev 58'; Ismailov (yellow card) 60'; Sharipov (yellow card) 72'	Summary	T.Zhangylyshbai 61'; Malyi (yellow card) 70'; Murtazayev 83'; Tarasov 90+4'	Stadium: BIIK Stadium; Attendance: 300; Referee: Abdanbayev

2 May 2013 Second Round	Shakhter Karagandy	2 – 1	Kairat	Temirtau
17:30 (UTC+6)	Simčević 13'; Finonchenko 40'; Vasiljević (yellow card) 45'; Khizhnichenko (yellow card) 77'; Tazhimbetov (yellow card) 87'	Summary	Duff (yellow card) 54'; Shestakov (yellow card) 60'; Kislitsyn 74'; Michalík (yellow card) 90'	Stadium: Metallurg Stadium; Attendance: 1,500; Referee: Denis Tevyashov

19 June 2013 Quarterfinal	Astana	1 – 2	Shakhter Karagandy	Astana
19:00 (UTC+6)	Ivanovski 67'	Summary	Zyankovich 12' (pen.); Tazhimbetov 85'	Stadium: Astana Arena; Attendance: 7,500; Referee: Sergey Gorokhovodatskiy

25 September 2013 Semifinal 1st leg	Irtysh Pavlodar	1 – 0	Shakhter Karagandy	Pavlodar
19:00 (UTC+6)	Shomko (yellow card) 45'; G.Suyumbayev (yellow card) 51'; Shabalin 90+3'	Summary	Đidić (yellow card) 35'; Ghazaryan (yellow card) 45'; Cañas (yellow card) 66'	Stadium: Central Stadium; Attendance: 3,500; Referee: Aleksandr Gauzer

30 October 2013 Semifinal	Shakhter Karagandy	2 – 0 (2 – 1 agg.)	Irtysh Pavlodar	Karaganda
17:00 (UTC+6)	Finonchenko 38'; Vasiljević (yellow card) 55'; Simčević 84'	Summary	Chuchman (yellow card) 55'	Stadium: Shakhter Stadium; Attendance: 9,000; Referee: Sergey Gorokhovodatskiy

10 November 2013 Final	Shakhter Karagandy	1 – 0	Taraz	Astana
16:30 (UTC+6)	Đidić (yellow card) 10'; Khizhnichenko 53'; Finonchenko (yellow card) 61'	Summary	D.Evstigneev (yellow card) 61'; S.Bauyrzhan (yellow card) 61'	Stadium: Astana Arena; Attendance: 24,500; Referee: Igor Aleshin

=== UEFA Champions League ===
==== Qualifying rounds ====
16 July 2013 Second qualifying round 1st leg	BATE Borisov (Belarus)	0 – 1	(Kazakhstan) Shakhter Karagandy	Barysaw, Belarus
22:00 (UTC+6)	Valadzko (yellow card) 62'; Rodionov (yellow card) 88'	Report	Simčević (yellow card) 46'; Khizhnichenko 48'; Finonchenko (yellow card) 75'; Paryvayew (yellow card) 78'	Stadium: Haradski Stadium; Attendance: 5,207; Referee: John Beaton (Scotland)

23 July 2013 Second qualifying round 2nd leg	Shakhter Karagandy (Kazakhstan)	1 – 0 (2 – 0 agg.)	(Belarus) BATE Borisov	Karaganda, Kazakhstan
19:30 (UTC+6)	Paryvayew (yellow card) 30'; Đidić (yellow card) 54'; Mokin (yellow card) 67'; Malyi (yellow card) 68'; Cañas (yellow card) 68'; Simčević (yellow card) 77'; Zyankovich 82'	Report	Likhtarovich (yellow card) 23'; Rodionov (yellow card) 68'	Stadium: Shakhtyor Stadium; Attendance: 18,800; Referee: Stephan Klossner (Switzerland)

30 July 2013 Third qualifying round 1st leg	Shakhter Karagandy (Kazakhstan)	3 – 0	(Albania) Skënderbeu Korçë	Astana, Kazakhstan
19:00 (UTC+6)	Đidić 8'; Finonchenko (yellow card) 23'; Murtazayev 79'; Khizhnichenko 90'	Report		Stadium: Astana Arena; Attendance: 21,800; Referee: Aleksei Nikolaev (Russia)

7 August 2013 Third qualifying round 2nd leg	Skënderbeu Korçë (Albania)	3 – 2 (3 – 5 agg.)	(Kazakhstan) Shakhter Karagandy	Tirana, Albania
00:00 (UTC+6)	Tomić 9' (yellow card) 59'; Shkëmbi 20' (pen.), 29' (pen.); Pejić (red card) 54'	Report	Vasiljević (yellow card) 20'; Malyi (yellow card) 28'; Khizhnichenko 38'; Đidić (yellow card) 45+2'; Baizhanov 67'	Stadium: Qemal Stafa Stadium; Attendance: 2,500; Referee: Ivan Kružliak (Slovakia)

20 August 2013 Play-off round 1st leg	Shakhter Karagandy (Kazakhstan)	2 – 0	(Scotland) Celtic	Astana, Kazakhstan
21:00 (UTC+6)	Finonchenko 12'; Khizhnichenko 77'	Report	Mouyokolo (yellow card) 20'	Stadium: Astana Arena; Attendance: 29,950; Referee: Pavel Královec (Czech Republic)

29 August 2013 Play-off round 2nd leg	Celtic (Scotland)	3 – 0 (3 – 2 agg.)	(Kazakhstan) Shakhter Karagandy	Glasgow, Scotland
00:45 (UTC+6)	Commons 45+1'; Samaras 48'; Ledley (yellow card) 67'; Forrest 90+2'; Brown (yellow card) 90+3'	Report	Simčević (yellow card) 18'; Cañas (yellow card) 36'; Vičius (yellow card) 40'	Stadium: Celtic Park; Attendance: 50,063; Referee: Svein Oddvar Moen (Norway)

=== UEFA Europa League ===
==== Group stage ====
Pos	Team	Pld	W	D	L	GF	GA	GD	Pts	Qualification
1	(Netherlands) AZ	6	3	3	0	8	4	+4	12 (Note: Tied on head-to-head points (2) and head-to-head goal difference (0). Head-to-head away goals: AZ 2, PAOK 1.)	Advance to knockout phase
2	(Greece) PAOK	6	3	3	0	10	6	+4	12	Advance to knockout phase
3	(Israel) Maccabi Haifa	6	1	2	3	6	9	−3	5	
4	(Kazakhstan) Shakhter Karagandy	6	0	2	4	5	10	−5	2	

Source: Soccerway
Notes:

19 September 2013 1	PAOK (Greece)	2 – 1	(Kazakhstan) Shakhter Karagandy	Thessaloniki, Greece
02:05 (UTC+6)	Tziolis (yellow card) 65'; Athanasiadis 75'; Vukić 90+2'	Report	Paryvayew (yellow card) 37' (yellow-red card) 87'; Cañas 50' (pen.); Ghazaryan (yellow card) 52'; Tarasov (yellow card) 79'	Stadium: Toumba Stadium; Attendance: 255; Referee: Fredy Fautrel (France)

3 October 2013 2	Shakhter Karagandy (Kazakhstan)	2 – 2	(Israel) Maccabi Haifa	Astana, Kazakhstan
23:00 (UTC+6)	Finonchenko 40'; Tarasov 45'; Cañas (yellow card) 50'; Đidić (yellow card) 64'	Report	Ezra 54'; Turgeman 79'	Stadium: Astana Arena, Attendance: 19,100; Referee: István Vad (Hungary)

24 October 2013 3	Shakhter Karagandy (Kazakhstan)	1 – 1	(Netherlands) AZ	Astana, Kazakhstan
23:00 (UTC+6)	Finonchenko 11'; Paryvayew (yellow card) 45+1'; Vasiljević (yellow card) 59'	Report	Guðmundsson 26'; Esteban (yellow card) 59'	Stadium: Astana Arena, Attendance: 10,500; Referee: Yevhen Aranovskiy (Ukraine)

7 November 2013 4	AZ (Netherlands)	1 – 0	(Kazakhstan) Shakhter Karagandy	Alkmaar, Netherlands
03:05 (UTC+6)	Ortiz 55'	Report	A.Borantayev (yellow card) 59'	Stadium: AFAS Stadion; Attendance: 9,778; Referee: Martin Hansson (Sweden)

28 November 2013 5	Shakhter Karagandy (Kazakhstan)	0 – 2	(Greece) PAOK	Astana, Kazakhstan
22:00 (UTC+6)	Cañas (yellow card) 25'; Paryvayew (yellow card) 41'	Report	Đidić 54' (o.g.); Lazăr (yellow card) 71'; Kitsiou 90+2'	Stadium: Astana Arena, Attendance: 7,556; Referee: Serge Gumienny (Belgium)

12 December 2013 6	Maccabi Haifa (Israel)	2 – 1	(Kazakhstan) Shakhter Karagandy	Haifa, Israel
03:05 (UTC+6)	Abukarat (yellow card) 43'; Scheimann (yellow card) 49'; Gozlan 72'; Abuhatzira 80'	Report	Cañas 44' (pen.)	Stadium: Kiryat Eliezer Stadium; Attendance: 2,100; Referee: Gediminas Mažeika (Lithuania)

== Squad statistics ==
As of match played 12 December 2013

=== Appearances and goals ===
No.	Pos	Nat	Player	Total		Premier League		Kazakhstan Cup		Champions League/Europa League		Kazakhstan Super Cup	
No.	Pos	Nat	Player	Apps	Goals	Apps	Goals	Apps	Goals	Apps	Goals	Apps	Goals
1	GK	(Kazakhstan) KAZ	Stas Pokatilov	12	0	10	0	0	0	2	0	0	0
3	MF	(Lithuania) LTU	Gediminas Vičius	36	1	13+5	1	6	0	11	0	0+1	0
4	DF	(Bosnia and Herzegovina) BIH	Nikola Vasiljević	32	1	19	1	3	0	9	0	1	0
5	DF	(Kazakhstan) KAZ	Askhat Borantayev	16	0	14	0	1	0	1	0	0	0
7	MF	(Kazakhstan) KAZ	Maksat Baizhanov	43	2	24+4	0	2+3	0	2+7	1	1	1
11	FW	(Kazakhstan) KAZ	Toktar Zhangylyshbay	14	1	7+5	0	1+1	1	0	0	0	0
13	MF	(Kazakhstan) KAZ	Vadim Borovskiy	12	1	10+1	1	1	0	0	0	0	0
14	FW	(Kazakhstan) KAZ	Andrei Finonchenko	40	11	16+7	6	4+1	2	11	3	1	0
17	DF	(Belarus) BLR	Andrey Paryvayew	37	1	21	0	4+1	0	10	0	1	1
19	DF	(Kazakhstan) KAZ	Yevgeni Tarasov	35	6	22+1	4	3+1	1	5+3	1	0	0
20	DF	(Bosnia and Herzegovina) BIH	Aldin Đidić	30	3	13+3	2	3	0	11	1	0	0
22	DF	(Kazakhstan) KAZ	Mikhail Gabyshev	18	2	12+2	2	1+1	0	0+2	0	0	0
24	MF	(Kazakhstan) KAZ	Aslan Darabayev	18	0	14	0	0+1	0	1+2	0	0	0
25	DF	(Kazakhstan) KAZ	Serhiy Malyi	35	0	14+4	0	5	0	11	0	1	0
27	DF	(Kazakhstan) KAZ	Bakyt Abuov	8	0	8	0	0	0	0	0	0	0
28	MF	(Armenia) ARM	Gevorg Ghazaryan	17	0	2+1	0	2+1	0	11	0	0	0
29	FW	(Kazakhstan) KAZ	Khamid Nurmukhametov	1	0	0+1	0	0	0	0	0	0	0
30	GK	(Kazakhstan) KAZ	Alexander Zarutsky	1	0	0+1	0	0	0	0	0	0	0
31	GK	(Kazakhstan) KAZ	Serhiy Tkachuk	7	0	4+2	0	1	0	0	0	0	0
33	MF	(Kazakhstan) KAZ	Akhat Zholshorin	3	1	2	1	0+1	0	0	0	0	0
34	DF	(Kazakhstan) KAZ	Ilya Pogibelko	2	0	0+2	0	0	0	0	0	0	0
35	GK	(Kazakhstan) KAZ	Aleksandr Mokin	34	0	18	0	5	0	10	0	1	0
42	DF	(Kazakhstan) KAZ	Dmitriy Zverev	2	0	0+2	0	0	0	0	0	0	0
45	FW	(Kazakhstan) KAZ	Roman Murtazayev	23	5	10+6	3	2+1	1	0+4	1	0	0
52	MF	(Kazakhstan) KAZ	Vladislav Akhmeev	4	0	2+2	0	0	0	0	0	0	0
77	FW	(Kazakhstan) KAZ	Stanislav Lunin	19	0	9+4	0	3	0	0+2	0	1	0
78	FW	(Belarus) BLR	Ihar Zyankovich	31	8	13+4	6	2+1	1	3+8	1	0	0
87	DF	(Serbia) SRB	Aleksandar Simčević	40	2	18+4	0	5	2	12	0	1	0
88	MF	(Colombia) COL	Roger Cañas	43	6	18+8	4	4	0	11+1	2	1	0
91	FW	(Kazakhstan) KAZ	Sergei Khizhnichenko	36	10	15+5	5	4	1	11	4	0+1	0
Players away on loan:
8	FW	(Slovenia) SLO	Borut Semler	5	0	1+2	0	1	0	0	0	0+1	0
9	MF	(Kazakhstan) KAZ	Vitaly Li	2	0	1	0	0+1	0	0	0	0	0
18	FW	(Kazakhstan) KAZ	Daurenbek Tazhimbetov	19	4	12+4	3	2	1	0	0	1	0
21	DF	(Kazakhstan) KAZ	Vladimir Sedelnikov	1	0	0	0	1	0	0	0	0	0
Players who appeared for Shakhter Karagandy that left during the season:
10	MF	(Kazakhstan) KAZ	Zhambyl Kukeyev	10	1	8+1	0	0	0	0	0	1	1
15	FW	(Latvia) LAT	Eduards Višņakovs	9	1	2+6	1	0+1	0	0	0	0	0

=== Goal scorers ===
Place	Position	Nation	Number	Name	Premier League	Kazakhstan Cup	Champions League/Europa League	Kazakhstan Super Cup	Total
1	FW	(Kazakhstan)	14	Andrei Finonchenko	6	2	3	0	11
2	FW	(Kazakhstan)	91	Sergei Khizhnichenko	5	1	4	0	10
3	FW	(Belarus)	78	Ihar Zyankovich	6	1	1	0	8
4	DF	(Kazakhstan)	19	Yevgeni Tarasov	4	1	1	0	6
4	MF	(Colombia)	88	Roger Cañas	4	0	2	0	6
6	FW	(Kazakhstan)	45	Roman Murtazayev	3	1	1	0	5
7	FW	(Kazakhstan)	18	Daurenbek Tazhimbetov	3	1	0	0	4
8	DF	(Bosnia and Herzegovina)	20	Aldin Đidić	2	0	1	0	3
8				Awarded	3	0	0	0	3
10	DF	(Kazakhstan)	22	Mikhail Gabyshev	2	0	0	0	2
10	DF	(Serbia)	87	Aleksandar Simčević	0	2	0	0	2
10	MF	(Kazakhstan)	7	Maksat Baizhanov	0	0	1	1	2
13	MF	(Lithuania)	3	Gediminas Vičius	1	0	0	0	1
13	FW	(Latvia)	15	Eduards Višņakovs	1	0	0	0	1
13	DF	(Bosnia and Herzegovina)	4	Nikola Vasiljević	1	0	0	0	1
13	MF	(Kazakhstan)	33	Akhat Zholshorin	1	0	0	0	1
13	MF	(Kazakhstan)	13	Vadim Borovskiy	1	0	0	0	1
13	FW	(Kazakhstan)	11	Toktar Zhangylyshbay	0	1	0	0	1
13	DF	(Belarus)	17	Andrey Paryvayew	0	0	0	1	0
13	MF	(Kazakhstan)	10	Zhambyl Kukeyev	0	0	0	1	0
				TOTALS	43	10	14	3	70

=== Disciplinary record ===
Number	Nation	Position	Name	Premier League		Kazakhstan Cup		Champions League/Europa League		Kazakhstan Super Cup		Total	
Number	Nation	Position	Name	Yellow card	Red card	Yellow card	Red card	Yellow card	Red card	Yellow card	Red card	Yellow card	Red card
3	(Lithuania)	MF	Gediminas Vičius	4	0	0	0	1	0	0	0	5	0
4	(Bosnia and Herzegovina)	DF	Nikola Vasiljević	4	0	2	0	2	0	0	0	8	0
5	(Kazakhstan)	DF	Askhat Borantayev	3	0	0	0	1	0	0	0	4	0
7	(Kazakhstan)	MF	Maksat Baizhanov	4	0	0	0	0	0	0	0	4	0
10	(Kazakhstan)	MF	Zhambyl Kukeyev	0	0	0	0	0	0	1	0	1	0
11	(Kazakhstan)	FW	Toktar Zhangylyshbay	1	0	0	0	0	0	0	0	1	0
13	(Kazakhstan)	MF	Vadim Borovskiy	3	0	0	0	0	0	0	0	3	0
14	(Kazakhstan)	FW	Andrei Finonchenko	3	0	1	0	2	0	0	0	6	0
17	(Belarus)	DF	Andrey Paryvayew	6	0	0	0	6	1	1	0	13	1
18	(Kazakhstan)	FW	Daurenbek Tazhimbetov	2	0	1	0	0	0	0	0	3	0
19	(Kazakhstan)	DF	Yevgeni Tarasov	5	1	0	0	1	0	0	0	6	1
20	(Bosnia and Herzegovina)	MF	Aldin Đidić	2	0	2	0	3	0	0	0	7	0
22	(Kazakhstan)	DF	Mikhail Gabyshev	3	0	0	0	0	0	0	0	3	0
24	(Kazakhstan)	MF	Aslan Darabayev	2	0	0	0	0	0	0	0	2	0
25	(Kazakhstan)	DF	Serhiy Malyi	3	0	1	0	2	0	1	0	7	0
27	(Kazakhstan)	DF	Bakyt Abuov	1	0	0	0	0	0	0	0	1	0
28	(Armenia)	MF	Gevorg Ghazaryan	0	0	1	0	1	0	0	0	2	0
35	(Kazakhstan)	GK	Aleksandr Mokin	0	0	0	0	1	0	0	0	1	0
42	(Kazakhstan)	DF	Dmitriy Zverev	1	0	0	0	0	0	0	0	1	0
45	(Kazakhstan)	FW	Roman Murtazayev	2	0	0	0	0	0	0	0	2	0
77	(Kazakhstan)	FW	Stanislav Lunin	3	0	0	0	0	0	0	0	3	0
78	(Belarus)	FW	Ihar Zyankovich	1	0	0	0	0	0	0	0	1	0
87	(Serbia)	DF	Aleksandar Simčević	4	0	0	0	3	0	0	0	7	0
88	(Colombia)	MF	Roger Cañas	2	0	1	0	4	0	1	0	8	0
91	(Kazakhstan)	FW	Sergei Khizhnichenko	1	0	1	0	0	0	0	0	2	0
			TOTALS	60	2	10	0	27	1	4	0	101	3

== Notes ==
1. The PAOK v Shakhter Karagandy match was played behind closed doors due to punishment by UEFA.
2. Shakhter Karagandy played their home matches at Astana Arena, Astana instead of their regular stadium, Shakhtyor Stadium, Karaganda.
1. The Shakhter Karagandy v Ordabasy originally finished 3-1 to Ordabasy, but due to Ordabasy fielding Mukhtar Mukhtarov who was ineligible, the match was awarded to Shakhter Karagandy 3-0.
