= Aruri =

Aruri or Arouri is a surname.

Notable people so named include:

- Khalid al-Aruri (1967–2020), Palestinian-Jordanian Islamic militant
- Mohamed Larbi Arouri (born 1983), Tunisian former professional footballer
- Naseer Aruri (1934–2015), American scholar-activist
- Saleh al-Arouri (1966–2024), Palestinian politician
