= Nikola Vasiljević (Bosnian footballer) =

Bosnian-Herzegovinian footballer

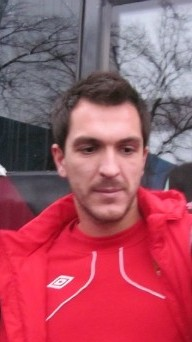

Personal information
- Full name: Nikola Vasiljević
- Date of birth: 19 December 1983 (age 42)
- Place of birth: Zvornik, SFR Yugoslavia
- Height: 1.99 m (6 ft 6 in)
- Position: Centre back

Senior career*
Years	Team	Apps	(Gls)
2002–2003	Drina Zvornik	18	(0)
2004–2006	Modriča	53	(1)
2006–2007	Jeju United	24	(0)
2008–2009	Modriča	33	(3)
2010	Croatia Sesvete	3	(0)
2010	Zvijezda Gradačac	14	(0)
2011–2015	Shakhter Karagandy	91	(10)
2016	Drina Zvornik	9	(0)
2016–2017	Shakhter Karagandy	20	(2)
2017–2018	Drina Zvornik	25	(1)
2018	Sloboda Tuzla	7	(0)
2019–2020	Drina Zvornik	16+	(1+)
2020–	Zvijezda 09		

International career
2006	Bosnia and Herzegovina	2	(0)
- * Club domestic league appearances and goals as of 23:23, 14 May 2019 (UTC)

Nikola Vasiljević (Serbian Cyrillic: Никола Васиљевић; born 19 December 1983) is a Bosnian-Herzegovinian retired footballer who has played as a defender for FK Drina Zvornik.

== Playing career ==
=== Club ===
Born in Zvornik, Vasiljević has played club football with Bosnian-Herzegovinian side FK Modriča, appearing in the UEFA Cup. He had a brief spell in the Prva HNL with NK Croatia Sesvete in 2010.

In 2011, Vasiljević joined Kazakh side FC Shakhter Karagandy and appeared in all but one league match in the 2011 season.

On 1 June 2017, Vasiljević left Shakhter Karagandy by mutual consent.

It was announced on 24 January 2019, that Vasiljević had returned to FK Drina Zvornik.

=== International ===
Vasiljević made two appearances for the full Bosnia and Herzegovina national football team, in two friendlies in 2006.

== Personal ==
Vasiljević has been confused with another footballer who shares his name and birthdate, but was born in Serbia.

== Career statistics ==
=== Club ===
As of match played 14 May 2017

Appearances and goals by club, season and competition
Club	Season	League			National Cup		Continental		Other		Total	
Club	Season	Division	Apps	Goals	Apps	Goals	Apps	Goals	Apps	Goals	Apps	Goals
Shakhter Karagandy	2011	Kazakhstan Premier League	31	2	2	1	4	0	-		37	2
Shakhter Karagandy	2012	Kazakhstan Premier League	23	4	4	0	2	0	1	0	30	4
Shakhter Karagandy	2013	Kazakhstan Premier League	19	1	3	0	9	0	1	0	32	1
Shakhter Karagandy	2014	Kazakhstan Premier League	10	2	1	0	-		1	0	12	2
Shakhter Karagandy	2015	Kazakhstan Premier League	8	1	0	0	-		-		8	1
Shakhter Karagandy	Total		91	10	10	1	15	0	3	0	119	11
Drina Zvornik	2015–16	Premier League of Bosnia and Herzegovina	9	0	0	0	-		-		9	0
Shakhter Karagandy	2016	Kazakhstan Premier League	16	2	0	0	-		-		16	2
Shakhter Karagandy	2017	Kazakhstan Premier League	4	0	1	0	-		-		5	0
Shakhter Karagandy	Total		20	2	1	0	-	-	-	-	21	2
Career total			120	12	11	1	15	0	3	0	149	11

=== International ===
Bosnia and Herzegovina national team
Year	Apps	Goals
2006	2	0
Total	2	0

Statistics accurate as of 6 November 2015

== Honours ==
FK Modriča

- Premier League of Bosnia and Herzegovina (1): 2007–08

Shakhter Karagandy

- Kazakhstan Premier League (2): 2011, 2012
- Kazakhstan Cup (1): 2013
- Kazakhstan Super Cup (1): 2013
