= Oleg Nedashkovskiy =

Kazakhstani footballer

Personal information
- Date of birth: 9 September 1987 (age 39)
- Place of birth: Taraz, Kazakh SSR, USSR
- Height: 1.84 m (6 ft 0 in)
- Position: Midfielder

International career
Years	Team	Apps	(Gls)
2013	Kazakhstan	1	(0)

Oleg Nedashkovskiy (Kazakh: Олег Недашковский; born 9 September 1987) is a Kazakhstani footballer. He played in one match for the Kazakhstan national football team in 2013.

== Career ==
Nedashkovskiy made his international debut for Kazakhstan on 4 June 2013 in a friendly international match against Bulgaria in Almaty Central Stadium, which finished as a 2–1 home loss.
