= Sergey Khizhnichenko =

Kazakhstani footballer

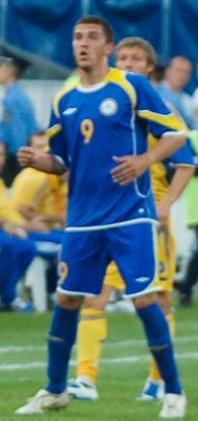
- Khizhnichenko playing for Kazakhstan in 2009

Personal information
- Full name: Sergey Aleksandrovich Khizhnichenko
- Date of birth: 17 July 1991 (age 35)
- Place of birth: Oskemen, Kazakh SSR, Soviet Union
- Height: 1.86 m (6 ft 1 in)
- Position: Forward

Team information
- Current team: Altai
- Number: 91

Youth career
- 2005–2006: Vostok

Senior career*
| Years | Team | Apps | (Gls) |
| 2006–2007 | Vostok-2 | 28 | (10) |
| 2008–2009 | Vostok | 38 | (7) |
| 2010 | Lokomotiv Astana | 15 | (2) |
| 2010 | → Atyrau (loan) | 14 | (1) |
| 2011–2013 | Shakhter Karagandy | 63 | (24) |
| 2014 | Korona Kielce | 26 | (1) |
| 2015 | Aktobe | 27 | (9) |
| 2016 | Tobol | 28 | (10) |
| 2017 | Shakhtyor Soligorsk | 8 | (2) |
| 2017 | Shakhter Karagandy | 18 | (1) |
| 2018 | Ordabasy | 4 | (0) |
| 2019 | Astana | 10 | (4) |
| 2020–2021 | Ordabasy | 41 | (6) |
| 2022 | Aksu | 6 | (0) |
| 2024– | Altai | 39 | (8) |

International career
| 2008–2009 | Kazakhstan U19 | 6 | (1) |
| 2009–2012 | Kazakhstan U21 | 10 | (2) |
| 2009–2020 | Kazakhstan | 52 | (8) |
- * Club domestic league appearances and goals as of 1 November 2026

Sergey Aleksandrovich Khizhnichenko (Russian: Сергей Александрович Хижниченко; born 17 July 1991) is a Kazakh professional footballer who plays as a forward for Altai.

== Career ==
=== Club career ===
Khizhnichenko began his career in 2006 with FC Vostok and in January 2008 he was promoted to the senior team. In November 2010 and January 2011, Sergey was on trial at Feyenoord.

In December 2014, Khizhnichenko signed a two-year contract with FC Aktobe.

On 23 January 2017, Khizhnichenko signed for FC Shakhtyor Soligorsk in the Belarusian Premier League.

On 6 January 2020, Astana confirmed that Khizhnichenko had left the club after the expiration of his contract.

=== International career ===
Khizhnichenko scored his first goals for the national team in a 3–1 win against Andorra on 9 September 2009. He scored twice.

Just over a month later, also in a qualifier, he scored the equaliser against Croatia, only for his side to lose the lead and the match.

Against Georgia in a pre-season friendly, he scored the only goal of the match as Kazakhstan recorded a rare victory. This was his first goal in almost three years playing for the national team.

In the 2018 FIFA World Cup qualifiers, Khizhnichenko scored two goals against Poland to help his team overcome a 2–0 deficit and end the match with a 2–2 draw.

== Career statistics ==
=== Club ===
As of match played 12 December 2019

Appearances and goals by club, season and competition
| Club | Season | League | | | National Cup | | Continental | | Other | | Total | |
| Club | Season | Division | Apps | Goals | Apps | Goals | Apps | Goals | Apps | Goals | Apps | Goals |
|---|---|---|---|---|---|---|---|---|---|---|---|---|
| Vostok-2 | 2006 | Kazakhstan First Division | 8 | 3 | — | | — | | — | | 8 | 3 |
| Vostok-2 | 2007 | Kazakhstan First Division | 20 | 7 | | | — | | — | | 20 | 7 |
| Vostok-2 | Total | | 28 | 10 | | | — | | — | | 28 | 10 |
| Vostok | 2008 | Kazakhstan Premier League | 14 | 1 | 1 | 0 | — | | — | | 15 | 1 |
| Vostok | 2009 | Kazakhstan Premier League | 24 | 6 | 4 | 0 | — | | — | | 28 | 6 |
| Vostok | Total | | 38 | 7 | 5 | 0 | — | | — | | 43 | 7 |
| Lokomotiv Astana | 2010 | Kazakhstan Premier League | 15 | 2 | 1 | 0 | — | | — | | 16 | 2 |
| Atyrau | 2010 | Kazakhstan Premier League | 14 | 1 | 1 | 0 | 2 | 0 | — | | 17 | 1 |
| Shakhter Karagandy | 2011 | Kazakhstan Premier League | 31 | 16 | 2 | 0 | 4 | 0 | - | | 37 | 16 |
| Shakhter Karagandy | 2012 | Kazakhstan Premier League | 12 | 3 | 0 | 0 | 0 | 0 | 1 | 0 | 13 | 3 |
| Shakhter Karagandy | 2013 | Kazakhstan Premier League | 20 | 5 | 3 | 1 | 11 | 4 | 1 | 0 | 32 | 10 |
| Shakhter Karagandy | Total | | 63 | 24 | 5 | 1 | 15 | 4 | 2 | 0 | 85 | 29 |
| Korona Kielce | 2013–14 | Ekstraklasa | 13 | 1 | 0 | 0 | — | | — | | 13 | 1 |
| Korona Kielce | 2014–15 | Ekstraklasa | 13 | 0 | 1 | 1 | — | | — | | 14 | 1 |
| Korona Kielce | Total | | 26 | 1 | 1 | 1 | — | | — | | 27 | 2 |
| Aktobe | 2015 | Kazakhstan Premier League | 27 | 9 | 4 | 1 | 2 | 0 | — | | 33 | 10 |
| Tobol | 2016 | Kazakhstan Premier League | 28 | 10 | 1 | 0 | — | | — | | 29 | 10 |
| Shakhtyor Soligorsk | 2016 | Belarusian Premier League | 8 | 2 | 4 | 1 | — | | — | | 12 | 3 |
| Shakhter Karagandy | 2017 | Kazakhstan Premier League | 18 | 1 | 0 | 0 | — | | — | | 18 | 1 |
| Ordabasy | 2018 | Kazakhstan Premier League | 4 | 0 | 0 | 0 | — | | — | | 4 | 0 |
| Astana | 2019 | Kazakhstan Premier League | 10 | 4 | 0 | 0 | 4 | 0 | 0 | 0 | 14 | 4 |
| Career total | | | 279 | 71 | 22 | 4 | 23 | 4 | 2 | 0 | 326 | 79 |

=== International ===
Kazakhstan national team
| Year | Apps | Goals |
|---|---|---|
| 2009 | 4 | 3 |
| 2010 | 5 | 0 |
| 2011 | 5 | 0 |
| 2012 | 2 | 0 |
| 2013 | 7 | 1 |
| 2014 | 6 | 2 |
| 2015 | 5 | 0 |
| 2016 | 8 | 2 |
| 2017 | 3 | 0 |
| 2018 | 2 | 0 |
| 2019 | 1 | 0 |
| 2020 | 4 | 0 |
| Total | 52 | 8 |

Statistics accurate as of match played 18 November 2020

=== International goals ===
As of match played 4 September 2016

| # | Date | Venue | Opponent | Score | Result | Competition | Ref |
|---|---|---|---|---|---|---|---|
| 1. | 9 September 2009 | Estadio Comunal de Aixovall, Andorra la Vella, Andorra | Andorra | 1–0 | 3–1 | 2010 FIFA World Cup qualification | |
| 2. | 9 September 2009 | Estadio Comunal de Aixovall, Andorra la Vella, Andorra | Andorra | 2–0 | 3–1 | 2010 FIFA World Cup qualification | |
| 3. | 14 October 2009 | Astana Arena, Astana, Kazakhstan | Croatia | 1–1 | 1–2 | 2010 FIFA World Cup qualification | |
| 4. | 14 August 2013 | Astana Arena, Astana, Kazakhstan | Georgia | 1–0 | 1–0 | Friendly | |
| 5. | 5 September 2014 | Astana Arena, Astana, Kazakhstan | Kyrgyzstan | 1–0 | 7–1 | Friendly | |
| 6. | 5 September 2014 | Astana Arena, Astana, Kazakhstan | Kyrgyzstan | 3–0 | 7–1 | Friendly | |
| 7. | 4 September 2016 | Astana Arena, Astana, Kazakhstan | Poland | 1–2 | 2–2 | 2018 FIFA World Cup qualification | |
| 8. | 4 September 2016 | Astana Arena, Astana, Kazakhstan | Poland | 2–2 | 2–2 | 2018 FIFA World Cup qualification | |
