= Kairat Utabayev =

Kazakhstani footballer

Personal information
- Full name: Kairat Utabayev
- Date of birth: 16 July 1980 (age 46)
- Place of birth: Tashkent, Kazakh SSR
- Height: 1.77 m (5 ft 10 in)
- Position: Defender

Senior career*
Years	Team	Apps	(Gls)
2000–2003	Pakhtakor Tashkent	73	(2)
2003–2006	Kairat	78	(1)
2007	Alma-Ata	15	(0)
2008	Megasport	25	(1)
2009	Andijan	22	(0)
2010	Kairat	14	(0)
2011	Shakhter Karagandy	28	(1)
2012	Irtysh	16	(0)

International career^{‡}
2002	Uzbekistan	1	(0)
2005–2007	Kazakhstan	10	(0)
- * Club domestic league appearances and goals as of 14 November 2014 ‡ National team caps and goals as of 14 November 2014

Kairat Utabayev (Kazakh: Қайрат Утабаев) (born 16 July 1980 in Tashkent, Kazakh SSR) is a retired Kazakhstani football defender.

== Career ==
=== Club ===
Utabayev retired from professional football at the end of the 2012 season, due to an upcoming operation where he received an artificial kidney.

=== International ===
Utabayev has made 10 appearances for the Kazakhstan national football team.

== Honors ==
=== Team ===
Pakhtakor Tashkent

- Uzbek League (1): 2002
- Uzbekistan Cup (2): 2001, 2002

Kairat

- Kazakhstan Premier League (1): 2004
- Kazakhstan Cup (1): 2003

Shakhter Karagandy

- Kazakhstan Premier League (1): 2011
