= Dušan Petronijević =

Serbian footballer

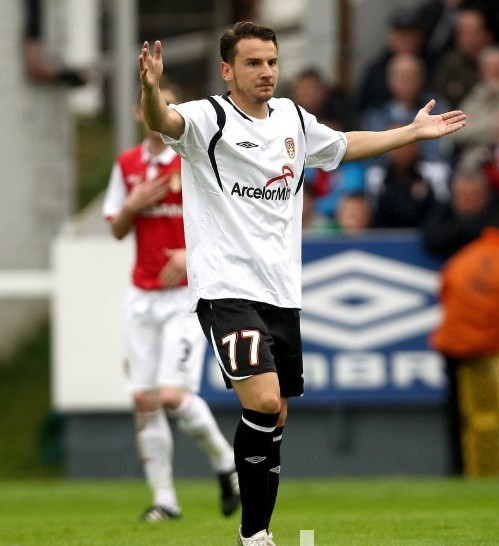
- Petronijević playing for Shakhter Karagandy away to St Patrick's Athletic in the Europa League in 2011

Personal information
- Full name: Dušan Petronijević
- Date of birth: 9 November 1983 (age 43)
- Place of birth: Kruševac, SFR Yugoslavia
- Height: 1.78 m (5 ft 10 in)
- Position: Midfielder

Youth career
- Napredak Kruševac
- Obilić

Senior career*
Years	Team	Apps	(Gls)
2002–2004	Obilić	28	(2)
2005–2007	BASK	37	(1)
2007–2009	Napredak Kruševac	47	(4)
2009–2010	Damash Iranian	12	(0)
2011	Borac Čačak	12	(1)
2011	Shakhter Karagandy	9	(0)
2012	Astana	9	(0)
2012–2014	Radnički Kragujevac	27	(0)
2016	Dinamo Vranje	11	(2)
2016	Jagodina	9	(2)
2017	BSK Borča	9	(0)
2017–2018	Sinđelić Beograd	22	(0)
Total		232	(12)

International career
2011	Serbia	1	(0)
- * Club domestic league appearances and goals

Dušan Petronijević (Serbian Cyrillic: Душан Петронијевић; born 9 November 1983) is a Serbian professional footballer who plays as a midfielder.

== Club career ==
Born in Kruševac, Petronijević started out at his hometown club Napredak. He made his senior debuts with Obilić in the 2002–03 season. Later on, Petronijević spent two seasons at BASK, before making a return to his parent club Napredak in the summer of 2007. He later moved to Iran and joined Damash Iranian.

In December 2011, Petronijević moved from Shakhter Karagandy to fellow Kazakhstan Premier League club Astana.

== International career ==
Petronijević made his only appearance for Serbia on 3 June 2011, coming on as a substitute for Dejan Stanković in a 1–2 friendly loss to South Korea.

== Statistics ==
Club	Season	League	
Club	Season	Apps	Goals
Obilić	2002–03	9	0
Obilić	2003–04	19	2
Obilić	Total	28	2

== Honours ==
Shakhter Karagandy

- Kazakhstan Premier League: 2011
