= Mohamed Larbi Arouri =

Tunisian footballer

Mohamed Arouri
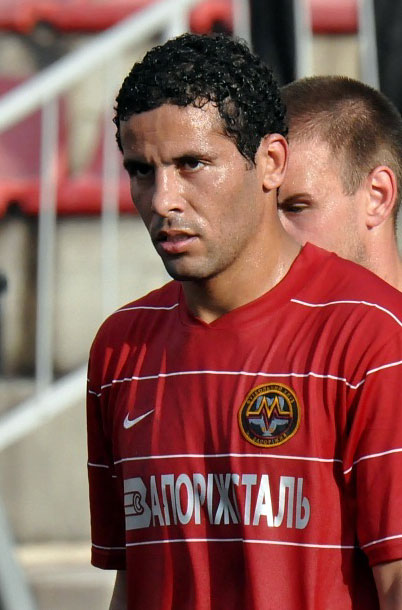

Personal information
- Full name: Mohamed Larbi Arouri
- Date of birth: 13 May 1983 (age 43)
- Place of birth: Tunis, Tunisia
- Height: 1.86 m (6 ft 1 in)
- Position: Left back

Youth career
- 1992–1999: Espérance
- 1999–2002: AS Marsa

Senior career*
Years	Team	Apps	(Gls)
2002–2003	AS Marsa		
2003–2006	ES Sahel		
2006–2009	Kaunas	55	(0)
2009	Kasserine	1	(0)
2010	Ordabasy	4	(0)
2010–2011	Metalurh Zaporizhya	13	(0)
2011	Oleksandria	4	(0)
2012–2013	Ordabasy	40	(2)

Managerial career
- 2023–: JS Omrane
- * Club domestic league appearances and goals

Mohamed Larbi Arouri (born 13 May 1983) is a Tunisian former professional footballer who played as a defender. He is the current manager of Jeunesse Sportive Omrane.

== Honours ==
- Baltic League: 2008
- Lithuanian Cup: 2008
- A Lyga: 2006, 2007
- CAF Confederation Cup: 2006
- Tunisian League Cup: 2005
