= Igor Soloshenko =

Kazakhstani footballer

Personal information
- Date of birth: 22 May 1979 (age 47)
- Place of birth: Karaganda, Kazakhstan
- Height: 1.74 m (5 ft 8 1/2 in)
- Position: Defender

Senior career*
Years	Team	Apps	(Gls)
1996–2001	Shakhter Karagandy	68	(0)
2001–2002	Zhenis Astana	28	(0)
2003–2004	Shakhter Karagandy	63	(3)
2005	Ayat Rudniy	8	(2)
2005–2006	Tobol	5	(0)
2006–2009	Shakhter Karagandy	49	(0)
2010	Okzhetpes	14	(1)
2011	Akzhayik	8	(1)
2011–2012	Shakhter Karagandy	1	(0)
2013	Okzhetpes	15	(2)

International career
1998–2005	Kazakhstan	11	(0)

Managerial career
- 2019–2023: Shakhter-Bulat (head coach)
- 2023–2024: Shakhter Karagandy (head coach)
- * Club domestic league appearances and goals

Igor Aleksandrovich Soloshenko (Russian: Игорь Александрович Солошенко; born 22 May 1979) is a Kazakh football coach and a former defender.

== Career ==
Born in Karagandy, Soloshenko started his career in Shakhter Karagandy in 1996, then played for FC Zhenis, FC Shakhter for a second time, FC Ayat and FC Tobol. He joined FC Shakhter for a third time in 2006. Soloshenko won the 2002 Kazakhstan Cup with Zhenis.

=== International ===
Soloshenko captained the Kazakhstan youth national team at the 1999 FIFA World Youth Championship in Nigeria and earned 11 caps for the senior Kazakhstan national football team from 1998 to 2005.

== Career statistics ==
=== International ===
Kazakhstan
Year	Apps	Goals
1998	5	0
1999	0	0
2000	0	0
2001	0	0
2002	0	0
2003	4	0
2004	1	0
2005	1	0
Total	11	0

Statistics accurate as of match played 8 September 2007
