= List of FC Kairat managers =

Football Club Kairat, commonly called FC Kairat, is a Kazakh professional association football club based in Almaty, whose first team play in the highest tier of Kazakh football, Kazakhstan Premier League, as of the 2015 season.

== Managers before 2011 ==
- (Russia) Leonid Pakhomov
- (Soviet Union) (Kazakh Soviet Socialist Republic) Timur Segizbayev
- (Soviet Union) (Kazakh Soviet Socialist Republic) Leonid Ostroushko
- (Soviet Union) Nikolai Starostin (1952–53)
- (Soviet Union) Vsevolod Bobrov (1975)
- (Russia) Boris Stukalov (Jan 1, 1991–Dec 31, 1991)
- (Turkmenistan) Kurban Berdyev (1994–95)
- (Kazakhstan) Vladimir Nikitenko (Jan 1, 1996–Dec 31, 2000)
- (Serbia) Zlatko Krmpotić (2001–02)
- (Tajikistan) Vladimir Gulyamhaydarov (2003)

== Managers since 2011 ==
As of 17 March 2026

Managers in italics were hired as caretakers.

Manager	From	To	P	W	D	L	GF	GA	Win %	Honours
(Kazakhstan) Vladimir Nikitenko	1 January 2011	12 June 2011	18	6	2	10	25	30	33.33	
(England) John Gregory	15 June 2011	12 December 2011	17	4	6	7	15	23	23.53	
(Kazakhstan) Dmitry Ogay	1 January 2012	6 June 2012	13	5	3	5	17	20	38.46	
(Spain) Pepe Serer	6 June 2012	22 November 2012	16	4	5	7	11	18	25.00	
(Slovakia) Vladimír Weiss	26 November 2012	30 November 2015	122	68	27	27	216	113	55.74	Kazakhstan Cup (2): 2014, 2015
(Russia) Aleksandr Borodyuk	28 December 2015	5 April 2016	4	0	2	2	3	5	0.00	Kazakhstan Super Cup (1): 2016
(Georgia (country)) Kakhaber Tskhadadze	7 April 2016	21 July 2017	67	46	14	7	152	52	68.66	Kazakhstan Super Cup (1): 2017
(Kazakhstan) Sergei Labodovsky	23 July 2017	26 July 2017	1	0	1	0	1	1	0.00	
(Spain) Carlos Alós	26 July 2017	16 October 2018	52	37	4	11	115	56	71.15	Kazakhstan Cup (1): 2017
(Kazakhstan) Andrei Karpovich	17 October 2018	24 November 2018	6	1	2	3	4	6	16.67	Kazakhstan Cup (1): 2018
(Belarus) Aleksey Shpilevsky	25 November 2018	7 June 2021	78	46	14	18	152	81	58.97	Kazakhstan Premier League (1): 2020
(Kazakhstan) Kirill Keker	7 June 2021	13 August 2021	16	8	3	5	31	20	50.00	
(Turkmenistan) Kurban Berdyev	24 August 2021	6 June 2022	32	14	8	10	53	46	43.75	Kazakhstan Cup (1): 2021
(Kazakhstan) Kirill Keker	8 June 2022	29 April 2024	60	29	15	16	95	72	48.33	
(Kazakhstan) Rafael Urazbakhtin	29 April 2024	28 May 2024	5	3	1	1	14	4	60.00	
(Russia) Aleksandr Kerzhakov	29 May 2024	3 September 2024	12	6	3	3	23	18	50.00	
(Kazakhstan) Rafael Urazbakhtin	6 September 2024	Present	66	38	13	15	122	75	57.58	Kazakhstan Premier League (2): 2024, 2025; Kazakhstan Super Cup (1): 2025
