= 2015 FC Shakhter Karagandy season =

FC Shakhter Karagandy
2015 season
- Chairman: Yerden Khalilin
- Manager: Vladimir Cheburin (until May 2015); Evgeny Sveshnikov (May - June 2015); Ihor Zakhariak (from June 2015)
- Stadium: Shakhter Stadium
- Kazakhstan Premier League: 10th
- Kazakhstan Cup: Second round vs Okzhetpes
- Top goalscorer: League: Mihret Topčagić (6); All: Mihret Topčagić (6)
Home colours	Away colours	Third colours

The 2015 FC Shakhter Karagandy season is the 24th successive season that the club will play in the Kazakhstan Premier League, the highest tier of association football in Kazakhstan. Shakhter Karagandy will also be participating in the Kazakhstan Cup.

== Season events ==
Manager Vladimir Cheburin resigned on 6 May, with Yevgeni Sveshnikov being appointed as caretaker manager. On 5 June Sveshnikov was released from his managerial duties, with Ihor Zakhariak being appointed in his place.

== Squad ==
As of 24 September 2015

Note: Flags indicate national team as defined under FIFA eligibility rules; some limited exceptions apply. Players may hold more than one non-FIFA nationality.

No.	Pos.	Nation	Player
1	GK	KAZ	Igor Shatskiy
3	DF	KAZ	Aleksei Muldarov
4	DF	BIH	Nikola Vasiljević
6	MF	KAZ	Andrei Karpovich
7	MF	NED	Desley Ubbink (loan from Taraz)
8	FW	KAZ	Oralkhan Omirtayev
9	FW	BIH	Mihret Topčagić
10	FW	UKR	Maksym Feshchuk
11	MF	KAZ	Vladislav Vasiliev
13	GK	KAZ	Alexander Zarutsky
14	FW	KAZ	Andrei Finonchenko
15	MF	KAZ	Aibar Nurybekov
17	DF	BLR	Andrey Paryvayew
19	DF	KAZ	Yevgeni Tarasov

No.	Pos.	Nation	Player
20	DF	BIH	Aldin Đidić
21	MF	KAZ	Gregory Dubkov
22	DF	KAZ	Mikhail Gabyshev
23	MF	KAZ	Eugene Kostrub
24	FW	CZE	Jan Vošahlík
25	DF	KAZ	Eugene Azamatov
33	GK	KAZ	Vyacheslav Kotlyar
35	GK	KAZ	Aleksandr Mokin
44	MF	KAZ	Kuanish Ermekov
45	FW	KAZ	Roman Murtazayev
52	DF	TTO	Aubrey David
70	MF	BUL	Plamen Dimov
84	MF	KAZ	Sergei Skorykh

=== Reserve team ===
Note: Flags indicate national team as defined under FIFA eligibility rules; some limited exceptions apply. Players may hold more than one non-FIFA nationality.

No.	Pos.	Nation	Player
12	GK	KAZ	Marlene Imagambetov
15	MF	KAZ	Akhat Zholshorin
24	DF	KAZ	Arman Sakhimov
27	MF	KAZ	Nursultan Zhusupov
28	DF	KAZ	Marat Rakishev
29	FW	KAZ	Khamid Nurmukhametov
33	DF	KAZ	Vladlen Antoshhuk

No.	Pos.	Nation	Player
37	DF	KAZ	Aleksandr Zemtsov
38	DF	KAZ	Aleksandr Nuikin
39	DF	KAZ	Aleksandr Matyshev
40	MF	KAZ	Anton Olenich
42	MF	KAZ	Sergey Vetrov
43	DF	KAZ	Dmitry Moiseev
47	MF	KAZ	Aslanbek Arshkenov

== Transfers ==
=== Winter ===
In: Note: Flags indicate national team as defined under FIFA eligibility rules; some limited exceptions apply. Players may hold more than one non-FIFA nationality.

No.	Pos.	Nation	Player
1	GK	KAZ	Igor Shatskiy (from (Kazakhstan) Bolat)
5	MF	BRA	Pedro Sass (from (Israel) Hapoel Ra'anana)
6	MF	KAZ	Andrei Karpovich (from (Kazakhstan) Atyrau)
21	DF	KAZ	Gregory Dubkov (from (Kazakhstan) Gefest)
23	MF	KAZ	Eugene Kostrub (from (Kazakhstan) Atyrau)
24	FW	CZE	Jan Vošahlík (from (Czech Republic) Baumit Jablonec)
25	DF	KAZ	Eugene Azamatov
33	GK	KAZ	Vyacheslav Kotlyar (from (Kazakhstan) Irtysh)
44	MF	KAZ	Kuanish Ermekov
52	DF	TTO	Aubrey David (from (Trinidad and Tobago) Caledonia AIA)

Out: Note: Flags indicate national team as defined under FIFA eligibility rules; some limited exceptions apply. Players may hold more than one non-FIFA nationality.

No.	Pos.	Nation	Player
1	GK	KAZ	Stas Pokatilov (to (Kazakhstan) Aktobe)
3	DF	LTU	Gediminas Vičius (to (Kazakhstan) Zhetysu)
7	MF	KAZ	Maksat Baizhanov (to (Kazakhstan) Atyrau)
10	GK	KAZ	Ulan Konysbayev (to (Kazakhstan) Astana)
25	DF	KAZ	Serhiy Malyi (to (Kazakhstan) Ordabasy)
27	FW	UZB	Kamoliddin Murzoev (to (Uzbekistan) Olmaliq)
29	MF	UZB	Shavkat Salomov (to (Uzbekistan) Olmaliq)
52	DF	SVK	Ján Maslo (to (Slovakia) Ružomberok)
84	DF	KAZ	Aleksandr Kirov (to (Kazakhstan) Zhetysu)
87	DF	SRB	Aleksandar Simčević (to (Kazakhstan) Ordabasy)

=== Summer ===
In: Note: Flags indicate national team as defined under FIFA eligibility rules; some limited exceptions apply. Players may hold more than one non-FIFA nationality.

No.	Pos.	Nation	Player
3	DF	KAZ	Aleksei Muldarov (from (Kazakhstan) Kaisar)
7	MF	NED	Desley Ubbink (loan from (Kazakhstan) Taraz)
10	FW	UKR	Maksym Feshchuk (from (Ukraine) Hoverla Uzhhorod)
15	MF	KAZ	Aibar Nurybekov (from (Kazakhstan) Atyrau)
70	MF	BUL	Plamen Dimov (from (Kazakhstan) Kaisar)
84	MF	KAZ	Sergei Skorykh (from (Kazakhstan) Kaisar)

Out: Note: Flags indicate national team as defined under FIFA eligibility rules; some limited exceptions apply. Players may hold more than one non-FIFA nationality.

No.	Pos.	Nation	Player
5	MF	BRA	Pedro Sass
7	MF	KAZ	Gevorg Najaryan
10	MF	CRO	Nikola Pokrivač (to (Israel) Maccabi Petah Tikva)

== Competitions ==
=== Kazakhstan Premier League ===
==== First round ====
===== Results summary =====
Overall								Home						Away					
Pld	W	D	L	GF	GA	GD	Pts	W	D	L	GF	GA	GD	W	D	L	GF	GA	GD
22	5	3	14	16	38	−22	18	4	2	6	12	18	−6	1	1	8	4	20	−16

Last updated: 28 July 2015.
Source: Soccerway

===== Results by round =====
Round	1	2	3	4	5	6	7	8	9	10	11	12	13	14	15	16	17	18	19	20	21	22
Ground	H	H	A	H	A	H	A	H	A	A	H	A	A	A	H	A	H	A	H	H	A	H
Result	D	L	L	L	L	W	L	D	L	L	L	L	L	L	W	L	W	L	L	D	W	W
Position	8	10	10	12	12	11	11	11	12	12	12	12	12	12	11	12	12	12	12	12	11	10

Source: Soccerway
A = Away; H = Home; W = Win; D = Draw; L = Loss

===== Results =====
7 March 2015 1	Taraz	0–0	Shakhter Karagandy	Taraz
15:00 ALMT (UTC+6)	D. Evstigneev (yellow card) 57'; Ubbink (yellow card) 87'	Summary	Paryvayew (yellow card) 56'; M. Gabyshev (yellow card) 87'; David (yellow card) 87'	Stadium: Central Stadium; Attendance: 1,500; Referee: Bolat Karlibayev

11 March 2015 2	Shakhter Karagandy	0–1	Ordabasy	Karaganda
16:00 ALMT (UTC+6)	Paryvayew (yellow card) 2'; Topčagić (yellow card) 39'	Summary	Simčević (yellow card) 34'; Kasyanov (yellow card) 37'; Nurgaliev (yellow card) 77'; G. Suyumbaev (yellow card) 78'; E. Tungyshbaev 85'; Malyi (yellow card) 90+1'	Stadium: Shakhter Stadium; Attendance: 1,000; Referee: Aydin Rakhimbayev

15 March 015 3	Astana	2–1	Shakhter Karagandy	Astana
17:00 ALMT (UTC+6)	Maksimović 31'; Cañas 76'	Summary	Topčagić (yellow card) 3' (goal) 44'; Vošahlík (yellow card) 36'	Stadium: Astana Arena; Attendance: 3,500; Referee: Igor Aleshin

21 March 2015 4	Shakhter Karagandy	1–2	Kaisar	Karaganda
16:00 ALMT (UTC+6)	Topčagić (yellow card) 71'; Karpovich (yellow card) 75'; Đidić (yellow card) 80'	Summary	Dimov 44'; R. Rozybakiev (yellow card) 83'; Junuzović 87'; Shestakov (yellow card) 90+1'	Stadium: Shakhter Stadium; Attendance: 1,800; Referee: Denis Tevyashov

5 April 2015 5	Tobol	4–1	Shakhter Karagandy	Kostanay
15:00 ALMT (UTC+6)	Kurgulin (yellow card) 53'; Zhumaskaliyev 62', 66', 87'; Šimkovič (yellow card) 79' (goal) 82'	Summary	Pokrivač (yellow card) 44'; Najaryan 59'; Murtazayev (yellow card) 70'; David (yellow card) 71'	Stadium: Central Stadium; Attendance: 3,000; Referee: Bagdat Abdullaev

11 April 2015 6	Shakhter Karagandy	2–1	Zhetysu	Karaganda
16:00 ALMT (UTC+6)	Pokrivač (yellow card) 20'; Karpovich 27'; Murtazayev 90+1'	Summary	Despotović 44'; Ergashev (yellow card) 56'	Stadium: Shakhter Stadium; Attendance: 1,500; Referee: Marat Iskakov

15 April 2015 7	Okzhetpes	1–0	Shakhter Karagandy	Astana
14:00 ALMT (UTC+6)	Chertov (yellow card) 5'; Buleshev 33'; A. Marochkin (yellow card) 38'; Sychev (yellow card) 70'; Di Chiara (yellow card) 82'	Summary	Karpovich (yellow card) 21'; Vasiliev (yellow card) 50'; Paryvayew (yellow card) 74'; Murtazayev (yellow card) 82'; Pokrivač (yellow card) 88'	Stadium: Astana Arena; Attendance: 600; Referee: Akmalkhan Kholmatov

20 April 2015 8	Shakhter Karagandy	2–2	Irtysh	Karaganda
16:00 ALMT (UTC+6)	Topčagić 18'; Murtazayev 33'; Pokrivač (yellow card) 44'; Karpovich (yellow card) 65'; Vošahlík (yellow card) 84'	Summary	Azuka 13'; David 23' (o.g.); Samsonov (yellow card) 31'; Kislitsyn (red card) 70'; Bancé (yellow card) 72'	Stadium: Shakhter Stadium; Attendance: 2,000; Referee: Anatoyli Vishnichenko

25 April 2015 9	Kairat	4–0	Shakhter Karagandy	Almaty
17:00 ALMT (UTC+6)	Marković 10'; Isael 57'; Islamkhan 80'; Gohou 85'; T. Rudoselskiy (yellow card) 87'	Summary		Stadium: Central Stadium; Attendance: 8,000; Referee: Ruslan Duzmambetov

3 May 2015 10	Atyrau	1–0	Shakhter Karagandy	Atyrau
19:00 ALMT (UTC+6)	Essame 68' (pen.); Parkhachev (yellow card) 89'	Summary	David (yellow card) 49'; Đidić (yellow card) 72'; Pokrivač (yellow card) 88'	Stadium: Munaishy Stadium; Attendance: 5,500; Referee: Igor Chesnokov

7 May 2015 11	Shakhter Karagandy	0–1	Aktobe	Karaganda
14:00 ALMT (UTC+6)	Pokrivač (yellow card) 3'; Paryvayew (yellow card) 24'; Vošahlík (yellow card) 75'	Summary	D. Miroshnichenko (yellow card) 24'; Danilo 37'	Stadium: Shakhter Stadium; Attendance: 3,000; Referee: Askhat Abdanbayev

16 May 2015 12	Ordabasy	1–0	Shakhter Karagandy	Shymkent
15:00 ALMT (UTC+6)	G. Suyumbaev (yellow card) 58'; Kasyanov (yellow card) 74'; Trajković 78'	Summary	David (yellow card) 17'; E. Kostrub (yellow card) 83'; Sass (yellow card) 90+4'	Stadium: Kazhimukan Munaitpasov Stadium; Attendance: 3,000; Referee: Timur Kumashev

24 May 2015 13	Shakhter Karagandy	0–4	Astana	Karaganda
14:00 ALMT (UTC+6)	Najaryan (yellow card) 65'; Sass (yellow card) 88'	Summary	Nusserbayev 11'; Twumasi 14'; Dzholchiev 72'; Shchetkin 90'	Stadium: Shakhter Stadium; Attendance: 3,000; Referee: Aydin Rakhimbayev

29 May 2015 14	Kaisar	2–0	Shakhter Karagandy	Kyzylorda
18:30 ALMT (UTC+6)	Strukov 34'; S. Keiler (yellow card) 36'; Junuzovic 57'	Summary	Pokrivač (yellow card) 28'; Paryvayew (yellow card) 82'	Stadium: Gany Muratbayev Stadium; Attendance: 3,000; Referee: Marat Iskakov

6 June 2015 15	Shakhter Karagandy	1–0	Tobol	Karaganda
18:00 ALMT (UTC+6)	Topčagić (yellow card) 12'; David (yellow card) 38'; Đidić (yellow card) 73'; K. Ermekov 90+4'	Summary	Klimavičius (yellow card) 12'; O. Krasić (yellow card) 73'	Stadium: Shakhter Stadium; Attendance: 2,500; Referee: Viktor Antonov

20 June 2015 16	Zhetysu	3–0	Shakhter Karagandy	Taldykorgan
18:00 ALMT (UTC+6)	Turysbek 5'; Savić 8', 80'; Shakhmetov (yellow card) 45'	Summary	Paryvayew (yellow card) 61'	Stadium: Zhetysu Stadium; Attendance: 2,000; Referee: Aleksandr Aliyev

24 June 2015 17	Shakhter Karagandy	3–0	Okzhetpes	Karaganda
18:30 ALMT (UTC+6)	Topčagić 3'; Pawlaw 19' (o.g.); R. Sakhalbayev (yellow card) 60'; Khokhlov (yellow card) 61'; S. Vetrov 83'	Summary	R. Sakhalbayev (yellow card) 59'	Stadium: Shakhter Stadium; Attendance: 2,000; Referee: Daniyar Sakhi

28 June 2015 18	Irtysh	3–1	Shakhter Karagandy	Pavlodar
19:00 ALMT (UTC+6)	N'Diaye 33', 47'; Chernyshov 54'	Summary	Y. Tarasov (yellow card) 14'; Karpovich (yellow card) 18'; Murtazayev 30'; E. Kostrub (yellow card) 63'; Topčagić (yellow card) 68' (red card) 74'	Stadium: Central Stadium; Attendance: 4,500; Referee: Bolat Karlibayev

5 July 2015 19	Shakhter Karagandy	0–5	Kairat	Karaganda
18:00 ALMT (UTC+6)	Vošahlík (yellow card) 5'	Summary	Serginho 6' (pen.); Riera 13', 59'; Isael (yellow card) 21'; Kukeyev (yellow card) 47' (goal) 83'; Ceesay 72'	Stadium: Shakhter Stadium; Attendance: 3,000; Referee: Viktor Antonov

11 July 2015 20	Shakhter Karagandy	1–1	Atyrau	Karaganda
18:00 ALMT (UTC+6)	Vasiljević 78'	Summary	Diakate (yellow card) 29'; Essame 84'	Stadium: Shakhter Stadium; Attendance: 2,500; Referee: Igor Aleshin

19 July 2015 21	Aktobe	0–1	Shakhter Karagandy	Aktobe
20:00 ALMT (UTC+6)	Aimbetov (yellow card) 84'	Summary	Sass (yellow card) 71'; S. Vetrov 86'; Y. Tarasov (yellow card) 90+5'	Stadium: Central Stadium; Attendance: 8,000; Referee: Askhat Abdanbayev

26 July 2015 22	Shakhter Karagandy	2–0	Taraz	Karaganda
19:00 ALMT (UTC+6)	Vasiljević (yellow card) 17'; Vošahlík (yellow card) 50'; Karpovich (yellow card) 60'; Feshchuk 76'; Đidić (yellow card) 81'; Murtazayev 90+4'	Summary	Pyschur (yellow card) 38'; Mera (yellow card) 42'; D. Evstigneev (yellow card) 52'; Vasilyev (yellow card) 59'; Dosmagambetov (yellow card) 70'	Stadium: Shakhter Stadium; Attendance: 3,000; Referee: Sergey Gorokhovodatskiy

===== League table =====
Pos	Team	Pld	W	D	L	GF	GA	GD	Pts	Qualification
8	Tobol	22	7	4	11	22	32	−10	25	Qualification for the relegation round
9	Taraz	22	7	3	12	17	25	−8	24	Qualification for the relegation round
10	Shakhter Karagandy	22	5	3	14	16	38	−22	18	Qualification for the relegation round
11	Zhetysu	22	4	5	13	17	32	−15	17	Qualification for the relegation round
12	Kaisar	22	3	8	11	12	25	−13	17	Qualification for the relegation round

Source: UEFA.com, Soccerway
Rules for classification: 1) Points; 2) Matches won; 3) Head-to-head points; 4) Head-to-head matches won; 5) Head-to-head goal difference; 6) Head-to-head goals scored; 7) Head-to-head away goals scored; 8) Goal difference; 9) Goals scored; 10) Away goals scored; 11) Draw.

==== Relegation round ====
===== Results summary =====
Overall								Home						Away					
Pld	W	D	L	GF	GA	GD	Pts	W	D	L	GF	GA	GD	W	D	L	GF	GA	GD
10	4	2	4	10	9	+1	14	2	2	1	7	4	+3	2	0	3	3	5	−2

Last updated: 10 November 2015.
Source: Soccerway

===== Results by round =====
Round	1	2	3	4	5	6	7	8	9	10
Ground	H	A	H	H	A	H	A	A	H	A
Result	D	L	W	D	L	L	W	W	W	L
Position	11	11	11	11	11	11	10	10	10	10

Source: Soccerway
A = Away; H = Home; W = Win; D = Draw; L = Loss

===== Results =====
15 August 2015 23	Shakhter Karagandy	0–0	Okzhetpes	Karaganda
19:00 ALMT (UTC+6)	E. Kostrub (yellow card) 32'	Summary	Cvetković (yellow card) 51'	Stadium: Shakhter Stadium; Attendance: 3,000; Referee: Bagdat Abdullaev

23 August 2015 24	Tobol	2–1	Shakhter Karagandy	Kostanay
17:00 ALMT (UTC+6)	Šimkovič 47', 58' (yellow card) 88'	Summary	Dimov 21'; Paryvayew (yellow card) 51'; Vasiljević (yellow card) 88'	Stadium: Central Stadium; Attendance: 2,500; Referee: Aydin Rakhimbayev

13 September 2015 25	Shakhter Karagandy	3–1	Zhetysu	Karaganda
18:00 ALMT (UTC+6)	Đidić 34'; Topčagić 81' (pen.); Feshchuk 84'	Summary	S. Sagyndykov (yellow card) 16'; Savić 23'	Stadium: Shakhter Stadium; Attendance: 1,800; Referee: Ruslan Duzmambetov

19 September 2015 26	Shakhter Karagandy	1–1	Kaisar	Karaganda
17:00 ALMT (UTC+6)	Karpovich (yellow card) 38'; Đidić (yellow card) 40'; Feshchuk 53'; Sass (yellow card) 90+1'	Summary	Z. Moldakaraev 31'; Shestakov (yellow card) 36'; Irismetov (yellow card) 65'; Mitošević (yellow card) 85'	Stadium: Shakhter Stadium; Attendance: 1,800; Referee: Denis Izmailov

27 September 2015 27	Taraz	2–0	Shakhter Karagandy	Taraz
16:00 ALMT (UTC+6)	Azuka 13' (pen.); D. Bashlay (yellow card) 14'; Mera (yellow card) 52'; Pyschur 79'	Summary	Dimov (red card) 12'	Stadium: Central Stadium; Attendance: 2,000; Referee: Igor Aleshin

3 October 2015 28	Shakhter Karagandy	1–2	Tobol	Karaganda
17:00 ALMT (UTC+6)	E. Kostrub (yellow card) 71'; Muldarov 80'	Summary	Šimkovič (yellow card) 48'; Zhumaskaliyev (yellow card) 53'; Zyankovich 61'; Bogdanov 75'	Stadium: Shakhter Stadium; Attendance: 1,200; Referee: Aydin Rakhimbayev

18 October 2015 29	Zhetysu	0–1	Shakhter Karagandy	Taldykorgan
17:00 ALMT (UTC+6)	T. Adilkhanov (yellow card) 26'; Turysbek (yellow card) 45'	Summary	Ubbink (yellow card) 26'; Karpovich 78'	Stadium: Zhetysu Stadium; Attendance: 1,000; Referee: Marat Iskakov

24 October 2015 30	Kaisar	0–1	Shakhter Karagandy	Kyzylorda
15:00 ALMT (UTC+6)	S. Keiler (yellow card) 9'	Summary	Murtazayev (yellow card) 31'; Dimov 69'	Stadium: Gani Muratbayev Stadium; Attendance: 1,000; Referee: Viktor Antonov

31 October 2015 31	Shakhter Karagandy	3–0	Taraz	Karaganda
15:00 ALMT (UTC+6)	Topčagić 5' (yellow card) 25'; Karpovich 57'; Vasiliev 60' (yellow card) 90+2'; Ubbink (yellow card) 69'	Summary	Mera (yellow card) 41'; O. Yarovenko (yellow card) 68'; Dosmagambetov (yellow card) 73'	Stadium: Shakhter Stadium; Attendance: 1,000; Referee: Igor Aleshin

8 November 2015 32	Okzhetpes	1–0	Shakhter Karagandy	Kokshetau
15:00 ALMT (UTC+6)	Buleshev (yellow card) 6' (goal) 62'; Cvetković (red card) 19'	Summary	G. Dubkov (yellow card) 61'	Stadium: Okzhetpes Stadium; Attendance: 2,000; Referee: Igor Chesnokov

===== League table =====
Pos	Team	Pld	W	D	L	GF	GA	GD	Pts	Relegation
7	Tobol	32	12	6	14	32	42	−10	30	
8	Okzhetpes	32	12	6	14	36	41	−5	29	
9	Taraz	32	10	8	14	25	33	−8	26	
10	Shakhter Karagandy	32	9	5	18	27	47	−20	23	
11	Zhetysu (O)	32	8	6	18	28	46	−18	22	Qualification for the relegation play-off
12	Kaisar (R)	32	4	12	16	20	36	−16	16	Relegation to the Kazakhstan First Division

Source: Soccerway
Rules for classification: 1) Points; 2) Matches won; 3) Head-to-head points; 4) Head-to-head matches won; 5) Head-to-head goal difference; 6) Head-to-head goals scored; 7) Head-to-head away goals scored; 8) Goal difference; 9) Goals scored; 10) Away goals scored; 11) Draw.
(O) Play-off winners; (R) Relegated

=== Kazakhstan Cup ===
29 April 2015 Second round	Shakhter Karagandy	1–2 (a.e.t.)	Okzhetpes	Karaganda
16:00 ALMT (UTC+6)	Smejkal 6' (o.g.); Paryvayew (yellow card) 17'; Pokrivač (yellow card) 40'	Summary	Rotkovic 55' (yellow card) 120'; Sakhalbayev 98'	Stadium: Shakhter Stadium; Attendance: 500; Referee: Aydyn Rakhimbayev

== Squad statistics ==
As of Match played 8 November 2015

=== Appearances and goals ===
No.	Pos	Nat	Player	Total		Premier League		Kazakhstan Cup	
No.	Pos	Nat	Player	Apps	Goals	Apps	Goals	Apps	Goals
1	GK	(Kazakhstan) KAZ	Igor Shatskiy	12	0	11	0	1	0
3	DF	(Kazakhstan) KAZ	Aleksei Muldarov	8	1	7+1	1	0	0
4	DF	(Bosnia and Herzegovina) BIH	Nikola Vasiljević	8	1	6+2	1	0	0
6	MF	(Kazakhstan) KAZ	Andrei Karpovich	22	3	15+6	3	1	0
7	MF	(Netherlands) NED	Desley Ubbink	10	0	6+4	0	0	0
8	FW	(Kazakhstan) KAZ	Oralkhan Omirtayev	7	0	0+7	0	0	0
9	FW	(Bosnia and Herzegovina) BIH	Mihret Topčagić	27	6	24+2	6	1	0
10	FW	(Ukraine) UKR	Maksym Feshchuk	11	3	9+2	3	0	0
11	MF	(Kazakhstan) KAZ	Vladislav Vasiliev	16	1	8+7	1	0+1	0
13	GK	(Kazakhstan) KAZ	Alexander Zarutsky	9	0	9	0	0	0
14	FW	(Kazakhstan) KAZ	Andrei Finonchenko	12	0	7+5	0	0	0
15	MF	(Kazakhstan) KAZ	Aibar Nurybekov	9	0	6+3	0	0	0
17	DF	(Belarus) BLR	Andrey Paryvayew	24	0	22+1	0	1	0
19	DF	(Kazakhstan) KAZ	Yevgeni Tarasov	14	0	13+1	0	0	0
20	DF	(Bosnia and Herzegovina) BIH	Aldin Đidić	28	1	27	1	1	0
21	MF	(Kazakhstan) KAZ	Gregory Dubkov	3	0	2+1	0	0	0
22	DF	(Kazakhstan) KAZ	Mikhail Gabyshev	15	0	14+1	0	0	0
23	MF	(Kazakhstan) KAZ	Eugene Kostrub	26	0	22+3	0	1	0
24	FW	(Czech Republic) CZE	Jan Vošahlík	27	0	19+7	0	0+1	0
25	DF	(Kazakhstan) KAZ	Eugene Azamatov	12	0	9+2	0	1	0
35	GK	(Kazakhstan) KAZ	Aleksandr Mokin	12	0	12	0	0	0
42	MF	(Kazakhstan) KAZ	Sergey Vetrov	14	2	9+4	2	1	0
44	MF	(Kazakhstan) KAZ	Kuanish Ermekov	17	1	12+5	1	0	0
45	FW	(Kazakhstan) KAZ	Roman Murtazayev	29	4	21+7	4	1	0
52	DF	(Trinidad and Tobago) TTO	Aubrey David	19	0	17+2	0	0	0
70	MF	(Bulgaria) BUL	Plamen Dimov	10	2	10	2	0	0
84	MF	(Kazakhstan) KAZ	Sergei Skorykh	1	0	1	0	0	0
Players away from Shakhter Karagandy on loan:
Players who appeared for Shakhter Karagandy that left during the season:
5	MF	(Brazil) BRA	Pedro Sass	24	0	15+8	0	1	0
7	MF	(Kazakhstan) KAZ	Gevorg Najaryan	9	1	5+3	1	1	0
10	MF	(Croatia) CRO	Nikola Pokrivač	14	0	13	0	1	0

=== Goal scorers ===
Place	Position	Nation	Number	Name	Premier League	Kazakhstan Cup	Total
1	FW	(Bosnia and Herzegovina)	9	Mihret Topčagić	6	0	6
2	FW	(Kazakhstan)	45	Roman Murtazayev	3	0	3
2	FW	(Ukraine)	10	Maksym Feshchuk	3	0	3
2	MF	(Kazakhstan)	6	Andrei Karpovich	3	0	3
5	MF	(Kazakhstan)	42	Sergey Vetrov	2	0	2
5	MF	(Bulgaria)	70	Plamen Dimov	2	0	2
5				Own goal	1	1	2
8	MF	(Kazakhstan)	7	Gevorg Najaryan	1	0	1
8	MF	(Kazakhstan)	44	Kuanish Ermekov	1	0	1
8	DF	(Bosnia and Herzegovina)	4	Nikola Vasiljević	1	0	1
8	DF	(Bosnia and Herzegovina)	20	Aldin Đidić	1	0	1
8	DF	(Kazakhstan)	3	Aleksei Muldarov	1	0	1
8	MF	(Kazakhstan)	11	Vladislav Vasiliev	1	0	1
				TOTALS	26	1	27

=== Disciplinary record ===
Number	Nation	Position	Name	Premier League		Kazakhstan Cup		Total	
Number	Nation	Position	Name	Yellow card	Red card	Yellow card	Red card	Yellow card	Red card
4	(Bosnia and Herzegovina)	DF	Nikola Vasiljević	2	0	0	0	2	0
5	(Brazil)	MF	Pedro Sass	4	0	0	0	4	0
6	(Kazakhstan)	MF	Andrei Karpovich	6	0	0	0	6	0
7	(Kazakhstan)	MF	Gevorg Najaryan	1	0	0	0	1	0
7	(Netherlands)	MF	Desley Ubbink	2	0	0	0	2	0
9	(Bosnia and Herzegovina)	FW	Mihret Topčagić	6	1	0	0	6	1
10	(Croatia)	MF	Nikola Pokrivač	6	0	1	0	7	0
11	(Kazakhstan)	MF	Vladislav Vasiliev	2	0	0	0	2	0
15	(Kazakhstan)	MF	Aibar Nurybekov	1	0	0	0	1	0
17	(Belarus)	DF	Andrey Paryvayew	7	0	1	0	8	0
19	(Kazakhstan)	DF	Yevgeni Tarasov	2	0	0	0	2	0
20	(Bosnia and Herzegovina)	DF	Aldin Đidić	5	0	0	0	5	0
21	(Kazakhstan)	MF	Gregory Dubkov	1	0	0	0	1	0
22	(Kazakhstan)	MF	Mikhail Gabyshev	1	0	0	0	1	0
23	(Kazakhstan)	MF	Eugene Kostrub	4	0	0	0	4	0
24	(Czech Republic)	FW	Jan Vošahlík	5	0	0	0	5	0
45	(Kazakhstan)	FW	Roman Murtazayev	3	0	0	0	3	0
52	(Trinidad and Tobago)	DF	Aubrey David	5	0	0	0	5	0
70	(Bulgaria)	MF	Plamen Dimov	0	1	0	0	0	1
			TOTALS	63	2	2	0	65	2
