= 2017 Kazakhstan Super Cup =

Astana	Kairat
0	2
- Date: 4 March 2017
- Venue: Central Stadium, Almaty
- Referee: Artyom Kuchin
- Attendance: 13,500

2017 Kazakhstan Super Cup was a Kazakhstan football match that was played on 4 March 2017 between the champions of 2016 Kazakhstan Premier League and 2017 Kazakhstan Cup Astana, and the Premier League & Cup Runners up Kairat.

== Match details ==
4 March 2017
15:00 UTC+06:00

Astana	0 – 2	Kairat
	Report	Arzo 76'; Kuat 90+4'

Central Stadium, Almaty
Attendance: 13,500
Referee: Artyom Kuchin

Astana	Kairat

GK	1	(Kazakhstan) Nenad Erić
DF	5	(Bosnia and Herzegovina) Marin Aničić
DF	15	(Kazakhstan) Abzal Beisebekov
DF	27	(Kazakhstan) Yuriy Logvinenko	(yellow card) 84'
DF	44	(Russia) Evgeni Postnikov		(substituted off) 83'
DF	77	(Kazakhstan) Dmitri Shomko	(yellow card) 78'
MF	7	(Kazakhstan) Serikzhan Muzhikov
MF	18	(Belarus) Ivan Mayewski	(yellow card) 57'
FW	10	(Albania) Azdren Llullaku		(substituted off) 72'
FW	23	(Ghana) Patrick Twumasi		(substituted off) 81'
FW	30	(Democratic Republic of the Congo) Junior Kabananga
Substitutes:
GK	35	(Kazakhstan) Aleksandr Mokin
DF	4	(Belarus) Igor Shitov		(substituted on) 83'
MF	22	(Kazakhstan) Gevorg Najaryan
FW	31	(Kazakhstan) Abay Zhunussov
FW	45	(Kazakhstan) Roman Murtazayev		(substituted on) 81'
MF	73	(Kazakhstan) Didar Zhalmukan		(substituted on) 72'
FW	80	(Kazakhstan) Vladislav Prokopenko
Manager:
(Bulgaria) Stanimir Stoilov

GK	1	(Kazakhstan) Vladimir Plotnikov
DF	4	(Kazakhstan) Yeldos Akhmetov
DF	5	(Kazakhstan) Gafurzhan Suyumbayev
DF	6	(Serbia) Žarko Marković	(yellow card) 90+2'
DF	14	(Spain) César Arzo
MF	7	(Kazakhstan) Islambek Kuat	(yellow card) 28' (yellow-red card) 90+3'
MF	8	(Russia) Mikhail Bakayev
MF	9	(Kazakhstan) Bauyrzhan Islamkhan		(substituted off) 90+2'
MF	10	(Brazil) Isael		(substituted off) 89'
MF	28	(Russia) Andrey Arshavin	(yellow card) 60'	(substituted off) 72'
FW	11	(Ivory Coast) Gerard Gohou
Substitutes:
GK	27	(Kazakhstan) Stas Pokatilov
DF	2	(Kazakhstan) Timur Rudoselskiy		(substituted on) 90+2'
MF	3	(Kazakhstan) Yan Vorogovskiy
DF	13	(Kazakhstan) Yermek Kuantayev
MF	15	(Kazakhstan) Baurzhan Turysbek
MF	16	(Kazakhstan) Oybek Baltabaev
MF	20	(Croatia) Ivo Iličević		(substituted on) 72'
MF	22	(Kazakhstan) Madiyar Raimbek
MF	23	(Kazakhstan) Georgy Zhukov		(substituted on) 89'
Manager:
(Georgia (country)) Kakhaber Tskhadadze

== See also ==
- 2016 Kazakhstan Premier League
- 2016 Kazakhstan Cup
