= 2014 Kazakhstan Super Cup =

| Aktobe | Shakhter Karagandy |
| 1 | 0 |
- Date: 9 March
- Venue: Astana Arena, Astana
- Referee: Ruslan Duzmambetov (Oskemen)
- Attendance: 14,000

2014 Kazakhstan Super Cup was a Kazakhstan football match that was played on 9 March 2014 between the champions of 2013 Kazakhstan Premier League, Aktobe, and the winner of the 2013 Kazakhstan Cup, Shakhter Karagandy.

This match was played on 9 March at the Astana Arena. Brazilian Danilo Neco scored the only goal of the match in the 68th minute and FC Aktobe won their third Super Cup.

== Match details ==
9 March 2014
14:00 UTC+06:00

| Aktobe | 1 – 0 | Shakhter Karagandy |
|---|---|---|
| Neco 68' | Report |

Astana Arena, Astana
Attendance: 14,000
Referee: Ruslan Duzmambetov (Oskemen)

| Aktobe | Shakhter Karagandy |

| GK | 55 | (Kazakhstan) Andrei Sidelnikov |
| RB | 3 | (Kazakhstan) Aleksei Muldarov |
| CB | 5 | (Kazakhstan) Petr Badlo (c) |
| CB | 7 | (Kazakhstan) Dmitri Miroshnichenko |
| LB | 16 | (Armenia) Robert Arzumanyan |
| CM | 21 | (Kazakhstan) Valeri Korobkin |
| CM | 23 | (Kazakhstan) Yuriy Logvinenko | (yellow card) 32' |
| RW | 10 | (Kazakhstan) Marat Khairullin |
| AM | 80 | (Uzbekistan) Timur Kapadze | | (substituted off) 72' |
| LW | 11 | (Brazil) Danilo Neco | | (substituted off) 90' |
| CF | 50 | (Uzbekistan) Alexander Geynrikh | | (substituted off) 89' |
Substitutes:
| GK | 34 | (Kazakhstan) Zhasur Narzikulov |
| DF | 4 | (Kazakhstan) Andrei Kharabara |
| DF | 9 | (Armenia) Marcos Pizzelli | | (substituted in) 72' |
| MF | 13 | (Kazakhstan) Evgeni Dyadenko |
| MF | 17 | (Kazakhstan) Askhat Tagybergen | | (substituted in) 90' |
| MF | 18 | (Kazakhstan) Pavel Shabalin | | (substituted in) 89' |
| FW | 95 | (Kazakhstan) Abat Aimbetov |
Manager:
(Kazakhstan) Vladimir Nikitenko

| GK | 35 | (Kazakhstan) Aleksandr Mokin |
| RB | 87 | (Serbia) Aleksandar Simčević | (yellow card) 38' |
| CB | 25 | (Kazakhstan) Serhiy Malyi |
| CB | 4 | (Bosnia and Herzegovina) Nikola Vasiljević |
| LB | 17 | (Belarus) Andrey Paryvaew |
| DM | 6 | (Portugal) Yago Fernández | | (substituted off) 83' |
| CM | 7 | (Kazakhstan) Maksat Baizhanov |
| CM | 10 | (Kazakhstan) Ulan Konysbayev | (yellow card) 58' |
| RW | 14 | (Kazakhstan) Andrei Finonchenko (c) |
| LW | 45 | (Kazakhstan) Roman Murtazayev | | (substituted off) 77' |
| CF | 9 | (Austria) Mihret Topcagić | | (substituted off) 70' |
Substitutes:
| GK | 1 | (Kazakhstan) Stas Pokatilov |
| DF | 19 | (Kazakhstan) Yevgeni Tarasov |
| MF | 3 | (Lithuania) Gediminas Vičius |
| MF | 29 | (Uzbekistan) Shavkat Salomov | | (substituted in) 83' |
| MF | 77 | (Kazakhstan) Stanislav Lunin | | (substituted in) 77' |
| FW | 21 | (Kazakhstan) Toktar Zhangylyshbay |
| FW | 27 | (Uzbekistan) Kamoliddin Murzoev | | (substituted in) 70' |
Manager:
(Russia) Viktor Kumykov

== See also ==
- 2013 Kazakhstan Premier League
- 2013 Kazakhstan Cup
