= 2012 Kazakhstan Super Cup =

Shakhter Karagandy	Ordabasy
0	1
- Date: 6 March 2012
- Venue: Astana Arena, Astana
- Referee: Ruslan Duzmambetov
- Attendance: 12,000

The 2012 Kazakhstan Super Cup was the fourth Kazakhstan Super Cup, an annual football match played between the winners of the previous season's Premier League, Shakhter Karagandy, and the previous season's Kazakhstan Cup, Ordabasy, with the latter winning on 1–0. This was both teams first appearance in the Kazakhstan Super Cup.

Astana were the defending champions as winners of the 2011 Kazakhstan Super Cup, but did not qualify for this edition, as they failed to win either the Premier League or the Kazakhstan Cup.

== Match details ==
6 March 2012
19:00 UTC+06:00

Shakhter Karagandy	0 – 1	Ordabasy
	Report	Ashirbekov 58'

Astana Arena, Astana
Attendance: 12,000
Referee: Ruslan Duzmambetov

Shakhter Karagandy	Ordabasy

GK	35	(Kazakhstan) Aleksandr Mokin
DF	4	(Bosnia and Herzegovina) Nikola Vasiljević	(yellow card) 60'
DF	17	(Belarus) Andrey Paryvayew	(yellow card) 54'
DF	20	(Bosnia and Herzegovina) Aldin Đidić
DF	21	(Kazakhstan) Aleksandr Kirov
MF	3	(Lithuania) Gediminas Vičius
MF	10	(Kazakhstan) Zhambyl Kukeyev
MF	11	(Kazakhstan) Maksat Baizhanov		(substituted off) 69'
MF	13	(Kazakhstan) Vadim Borovsky		(substituted off) 64'
FW	14	(Kazakhstan) Andrei Finonchenko
FW	91	(Kazakhstan) Sergei Khizhnichenko		(substituted off) 81'
Substitutes:
GK	1	(Kazakhstan) Aleksandr Grigorenko
DF	5	(Kazakhstan) Mikhail Gabyshev
MF	6	(Bosnia and Herzegovina) Danijel Majkić
FW	8	(Kazakhstan) Serik Dosmanbetov		(substituted in) 81'
DF	19	(Kazakhstan) Yevgeny Tarasov
FW	77	(Kazakhstan) Stanislav Lunin		(substituted in) 64'
MF	88	(Colombia) Roger Cañas	(yellow card) 84'	(substituted in) 69'
Manager:
(Russia) Viktor Kumykov

GK	16	(Kazakhstan) Almat Bekbaev
DF	2	(Kazakhstan) Farkhadbek Irismetov
DF	3	(Uganda) Andrew Mwesigwa
DF	6	(Serbia) Aleksandar Trajkovic	(yellow card) 86'
DF	14	(Kazakhstan) Bakdaulet Kozhabaev
DF	99	(Tunisia) Mohamed Arouri	(yellow card) 53'
MF	8	(Kazakhstan) Andrei Karpovich
MF	10	(Kazakhstan) Kairat Ashirbekov
MF	12	(Ukraine) Artem Kasyanov
FW	7	(Kazakhstan) Roman Pakholyuk		(substituted off) 81'
FW	18	(Kazakhstan) Daurenbek Tazhimbetov		(substituted off) 90'
Substitutes:
GK	1	(Kazakhstan) Samat Otarbayev
DF	4	(Kazakhstan) Maksim Zhalmagambetov
FW	11	(Senegal) Mansour Gueye		(substituted in) 81'
MF	15	(Kazakhstan) Bekzat Beisenov		(substituted in) 90'
MF	17	(Kazakhstan) Mardan Tolebek
DF	77	(Kazakhstan) Talgat Adyrbekov
Manager:
(Ukraine) Viktor Pasulko

== See also ==
- 2011 Kazakhstan Premier League
- 2011 Kazakhstan Cup
