= Mansour Gueye =

Senegalese-Romanian footballer

Personal information
- Date of birth: 30 December 1985 (age 40)
- Place of birth: Dakar, Senegal
- Height: 1.85 m (6 ft 1 in)
- Position: Striker

Team information
- Current team: Barcău Nușfalău

Youth career
- 1999–2003: Servette

Senior career*
Years	Team	Apps	(Gls)
2003–2004	Servette II		
2004–2011	Politehnica Timișoara	82	(17)
2008	→ CS Buftea (loan)	14	(8)
2009	→ Gloria Buzău (loan)	14	(7)
2012–2013	Ordabasy	39	(10)
2014	Poli Timișoara	5	(0)
2014	Hajer	7	(1)
2016	Lokomotiv Plovdiv	2	(0)
2017	Santa Ponsa Talarrubias	6	(17)
2018	Șirineasa	11	(6)
2018–2019	Ripensia Timișoara	30	(4)
2019–2020	Flacăra Horezu	13	(9)
2020–2022	Șimleu Silvaniei	42	(21)
2022–2023	Satu Mare	19	(7)
2023–2024	Sighetu Marmației	10	(3)
2025–	Barcău Nușfalău		

Managerial career
- 2021–2022: Șimleu Silvaniei (fitness coach)
- 2024–2025: Satu Mare (fitness coach)
- * Club domestic league appearances and goals as of 12:45, 23 November 2023 (UTC)

Mansour Gueye (born 30 December 1985) is a Senegalese-Romanian footballer who plays as a striker for Romanian Liga IV side Barcău Nușfalău. He was nicknamed "Omul-Foarfecă" ("Scissors Man") in Romania due to his spectacular scissors kick goals.

== Career ==
=== Servette ===
Mansour was born on 30 December 1985 in Dakar, Senegal, but moved to Switzerland in 1999 at age 14 and signed with Servette. He played mainly for the club's youth center, with his last season culminating in a promotion to the satellite team.

=== Politehnica Timișoara and loans ===
In 2004, Mansour was transferred to Romanian team Politehnica Timișoara, making his Divizia A debut on 11 August under caretaker coach Călin Zanc who sent him in the 80th minute to replace Cristian Silvășan in a 2–1 away loss to FCM Bacău. In the following game, he was used by new coach Gheorghe Mulțescu as a starter, scoring his first two goals in a 2–1 home win over FC Brașov. Afterwards he scored three goals against each of the Bucharest giants, Rapid, Dinamo and Steaua, including a scissors kick against Dinamo that left goalkeeper Bogdan Stelea without a reaction. By the end of the season, Mansour scored the only goal of a 1–0 home victory over Farul Constanța. Subsequently, in the last round of the season he opened the score after a spectacular combination with Viorel Moldovan in a 2–1 loss at the Ghencea Stadium against the eventual champions, Steaua. Thus, he netted a total of seven goals scored in the 2004–05 season. In the following season, Mansour was coached by Gheorghe Hagi for a while, scoring only two goals in two wins over Politehnica Iași and FCM Bacău. In the 2006–07 season, Mansour helped the team reach the Cupa României final, where coach Valentin Velcea used him as a starter, but replaced him in the 55th minute with Andrei Cristea in the 2–0 loss to Rapid. In the next season, Mansour scored only one goal in the league, but it was a spectacular one, with a scissors kick after a counter-attack in a 2–0 victory against Steaua.

Mansour started the 2008–09 season by playing for Liga II club, CS Buftea, being loaned there by Politehnica, and demonstrating a keen appetite for scoring goals, as he netted eight times in the first half of the season. For the second half, he returned to first league football, with Politehnica loaning him this time to Gloria Buzău. There, he scored seven goals, of which five were in the last four matches of the season, including one in a draw against Universitatea Craiova, two in a victory over Vaslui, one in a 1–1 draw against Politehnica Iași and one in a 2–1 success over Gloria Bistrița. These performances helped his side avoid relegation.

In the summer of 2009, Mansour returned to Politehnica, but in a friendly against Debrecen in July he suffered an injury which kept him off the field for the entire first half of the season. Subsequently, he made six appearances in the second half of the season, scoring a brace in a 6–0 win over Unirea Alba Iulia and opening the score in a 1–1 draw against Ceahlăul Piatra Neamț. In the following season, Mansour made his debut in European competitions, as coach Vladimir Petrović sent him in the 72nd minute to replace Lukáš Magera in a 3–3 draw against MyPa in the second leg of the 2010–11 Europa League third qualifying round. Politehnica advanced to the play-offs where they were eliminated by Manchester City without him playing. On 22 September 2010, Mansour scored one goal in a 3–1 victory in the Cupa României against second league side, Juventus București, but he also suffered another serious injury which kept him off the field for a long period of time.

During his years spent at Politehnica, Mansour had offers from Premier League side Newcastle United and Bundesliga's Werder Bremen, and also from Bucharest teams, Rapid, Dinamo and Steaua, but due to his injuries or failed negotiations, the transfers were never made.

=== Ordabasy ===
In 2012 Mansour signed with Kazakhstan Premier League side, Ordabasy. On 6 March 2012, coach Viktor Pasulko sent him in the 81st minute to replace Roman Pakholyuk in the 1–0 win over Shakhter Karagandy in the 2012 Kazakhstan Super Cup, thus winning the only trophy of his career. Subsequently, in the 2012–13 Europa League campaign, Mansour scored a goal which helped them eliminate Jagodina, and in the following round he scored two goals in the 4–3 aggregate loss to Rosenborg.

=== Poli Timișoara ===
For the second half of the 2013–14 season, Mansour returned to Timișoara at ACS Poli. However, the spell was unsuccessful as they were relegated at the end of the season, with him making only five Liga I appearances, totaling 101 matches with 24 goals in the competition.

=== Late career ===
Afterwards, Mansour joined Saudi Pro League side Hajer for a short while, and in 2016 he made two appearances in the Bulgarian First Professional League for Lokomotiv Plovdiv. In 2017 he played for Santa Ponsa Talarrubias in the lowest league of the Balearic Islands, scoring 17 goals in six appearances. In the final years of his career, Mansour played in the Romanian lower leagues for several clubs.

== Personal life ==
Mansour has three brothers and four sisters, and two of his brothers were also footballers: Azis played at junior level in Italy for Fiorentina, Juventus and A.S. Roma, while Ousmane played mostly for clubs in the Romanian lower leagues. In 2008 he married Adelina Ziele, but got divorced after a few months. Around 2010 he met Ramona Popa who gave birth about one year later to his first child, Mouhamed.

== Honours ==
Politehnica Timișoara

- Cupa României runner-up: 2006–07

Ordabasy

- Kazakhstan Super Cup: 2012
