= 2018 Kazakhstan Super Cup =

Astana	Kairat
3	0
- Date: 4 March 2018
- Venue: Astana Arena, Astana
- Referee: Artyom Kuchin
- Attendance: 12,500

2018 Kazakhstan Super Cup was a Kazakhstan football match that was played on 4 March 2018 between the champions of 2017 Kazakhstan Premier League, Astana, and the winner of the 2017 Kazakhstan Cup, Kairat.

== Match details ==
4 March 2018
15:00 UTC+06:00

Astana	3 – 0	Kairat
Mayewski 59'; Tomasov 62', 67'	Report

Astana Arena, Astana
Attendance: 12,500
Referee: Artyom Kuchin

Astana	Kairat

GK	1	(Kazakhstan) Nenad Erić
DF	5	(Bosnia and Herzegovina) Marin Aničić
DF	15	(Kazakhstan) Abzal Beisebekov
DF	44	(Russia) Evgeni Postnikov
DF	77	(Kazakhstan) Dmitri Shomko
MF	6	(Hungary) László Kleinheisler		(substituted off) 81'
MF	7	(Kazakhstan) Serikzhan Muzhikov	(yellow card) 55'	(substituted off) 70'
MF	14	(Croatia) Marin Tomasov
MF	18	(Belarus) Ivan Mayewski
FW	9	(Serbia) Đorđe Despotović		(substituted off) 73'
FW	23	(Ghana) Patrick Twumasi
Substitutes:
GK	35	(Kazakhstan) Aleksandr Mokin
DF	4	(Belarus) Igor Shitov
DF	27	(Kazakhstan) Yuriy Logvinenko
MF	28	(Kazakhstan) Yuriy Pertsukh		(substituted in) 70'
FW	45	(Kazakhstan) Roman Murtazayev
MF	88	(Serbia) Marko Stanojević		(substituted in) 81'
FW	99	(Kazakhstan) Aleksey Shchotkin		(substituted in) 70'
Manager:
(Kazakhstan) Grigori Babayan

GK	1	(Kazakhstan) Vladimir Plotnikov
DF	4	(Trinidad and Tobago) Sheldon Bateau
DF	5	(Kazakhstan) Gafurzhan Suyumbayev
DF	17	(Kazakhstan) Stanislav Lunin
DF	26	(Ivory Coast) Cédric Gogoua	(yellow card) 58'
MF	7	(Kazakhstan) Islambek Kuat		(substituted off) 78'
MF	8	(Kazakhstan) Georgy Zhukov		(substituted off) 68'
MF	10	(Brazil) Isael
MF	25	(Hungary) Ákos Elek
MF	28	(Russia) Andrey Arshavin		(substituted off) 68'
FW	11	(Uruguay) Hugo Silveira
Substitutes:
GK	27	(Kazakhstan) Stas Pokatilov
DF	2	(Kazakhstan) Yeldos Akhmetov
MF	9	(Kazakhstan) Bauyrzhan Islamkhan		(substituted in) 68'
DF	14	(Kazakhstan) Aybol Abiken
MF	19	(Israel) Gai Assulin		(substituted in) 68'
FW	22	(Kazakhstan) Magomed Paragulgov		(substituted in) 78'
FW	23	(Kazakhstan) Vyacheslav Shvyrev
Manager:
(Spain) Carlos Ferrer

== See also ==
- 2017 Kazakhstan Premier League
- 2017 Kazakhstan Cup
