= 2020 Kazakhstan Super Cup =

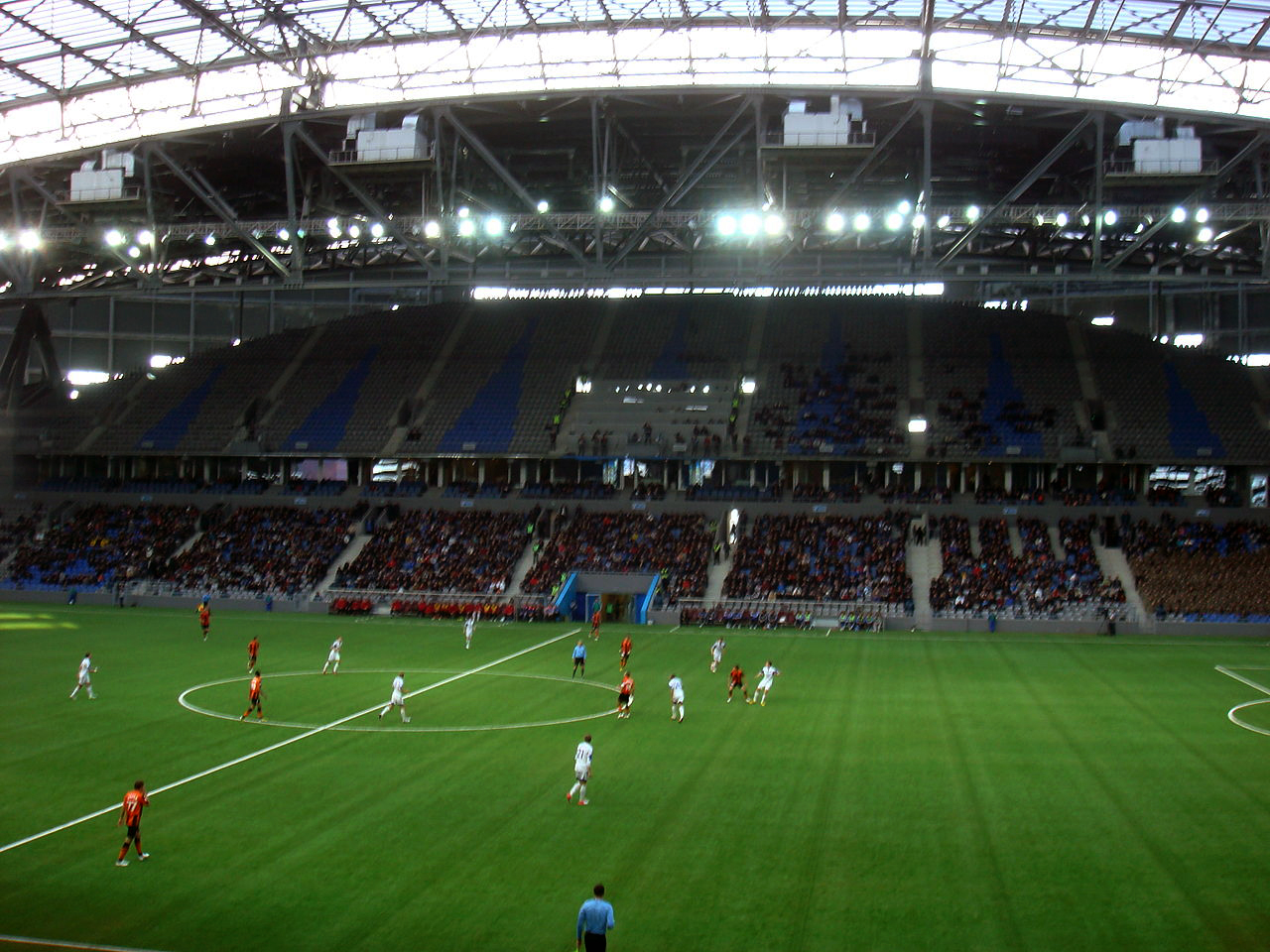
Astana	Kaisar
1	0
- Date: 29 February 2020
- Venue: Tobol Arena, Kostanay
- Referee: Anatolyi Vishnichenko
- Attendance: 2,900

The 2020 Kazakhstan Super Cup was a Kazakhstan football match that was played on 29 February 2020 between the champions of the 2019 Kazakhstan Premier League, Astana, and the winner of the 2019 Kazakhstan Cup, Kaisar.

== Match details ==
29 February 2020
17:00 UTC+06:00

Astana	1 – 0	Kaisar
Sotiriou 40'	Report

Tobol Arena, Kostanay
Attendance: 2,900
Referee: Anatolyi Vishnichenko

Astana	Kaisar

GK	1	(Kazakhstan) Nenad Erić
DF	15	(Kazakhstan) Abzal Beisebekov
DF	25	(Kazakhstan) Serhiy Malyi
DF	44	(Russia) Evgeni Postnikov	(yellow card) 37'
DF	77	(Kazakhstan) Dmitri Shomko	(yellow card) 10'
MF	7	(Belarus) Max Ebong		(substituted off) 77'
MF	10	(Iceland) Rúnar Már Sigurjónsson
MF	11	(Armenia) Tigran Barseghyan		(substituted off) 69'
MF	14	(Croatia) Marin Tomasov
MF	18	(Belarus) Ivan Mayewski
FW	20	(Cyprus) Pieros Sotiriou	(yellow card) 53'	(substituted off) 90+2'
Substitutes:
GK	22	(Kazakhstan) Dmytro Nepohodov
GK	53	(Kazakhstan) Stanislav Pavlov
DF	2	(Serbia) Antonio Rukavina
FW	9	(Romania) Dorin Rotariu		(substituted on) 69'
DF	24	(Croatia) Luka Šimunović
DF	27	(Kazakhstan) Yuriy Logvinenko		(substituted on) 77'
MF	28	(Kazakhstan) Yuriy Pertsukh
MF	73	(Kazakhstan) Didar Zhalmukan
FW	99	(Kazakhstan) Aleksey Shchotkin		(substituted on) 90+2'
Manager:
(Czech Republic) Michal Bílek

GK	71	(Kyrgyzstan) Marsel Islamkulov
DF	5	(Kazakhstan) Bagdat Kairov
DF	13	(Kazakhstan) Ilyas Amirseitov
DF	22	(Kazakhstan) Aleksandr Marochkin
DF	55	(Croatia) Ivan Graf	(yellow card) 13'
MF	8	(Kazakhstan) Askhat Tagybergen		(substituted off) 89'
MF	10	(Kazakhstan) Duman Narzildaev
MF	19	(Cameroon) Clarence Bitang	(yellow card) 29'	(substituted off) 75'
MF	92	(Croatia) Ivan Pešić
FW	9	(Georgia (country)) Elguja Lobjanidze
FW	99	(Mozambique) Reginaldo		(substituted off) 60'
Substitutes:
GK	34	(Kazakhstan) Nurymzhan Salaidin
DF	2	(Kazakhstan) Yeldos Akhmetov
FW	7	(Bulgaria) Aleksandar Kolev		(substituted on) 75'
MF	11	(Kazakhstan) Shokhan Abzalov
DF	14	(Kazakhstan) Mark Gorman
DF	39	(Russia) Aleksei Shumskikh
DF	77	(Kazakhstan) Kuanysh Kalmuratov
MF	88	(Kazakhstan) Magomed Paragulgov		(substituted on) 89'
MF	94	(Cape Verde) Alvin Fortes		(substituted on) 60'
Manager:
(Bulgaria) Stoycho Mladenov

== See also ==
- 2019 Kazakhstan Premier League
- 2019 Kazakhstan Cup
