= Ivan Pešić (footballer, born 1992) =

Croatian footballer

Personal information
- Date of birth: 6 April 1992 (age 34)
- Place of birth: Šibenik, Croatia
- Height: 1.83 m (6 ft 0 in)
- Position: Left winger

Team information
- Current team: AGMK
- Number: 77

Youth career
- 2002–2004: Oluja Čista Velika
- 2004–2006: Vodice
- 2006–2011: Hajduk Split

Senior career*
Years	Team	Apps	(Gls)
2011–2012	Hajduk Split	0	(0)
2012	Austria Klagenfurt	0	(0)
2012–2013	Šibenik	9	(0)
2014–2015	Zadar	34	(4)
2015–2017	RNK Split	62	(5)
2017	Hajduk Split	12	(0)
2018–2020	Dinamo București	26	(5)
2019	→ Shakhter Karagandy (loan)	33	(8)
2020	Kaisar	2	(0)
2020–2022	Vorskla Poltava	23	(1)
2021	→ Voluntari (loan)	18	(1)
2022	Dinamo Minsk	4	(0)
2022	Caspiy	10	(3)
2023	Alashkert	11	(1)
2023–2024	Rudeš	14	(0)
2024–2025	Chindia Târgoviște	26	(8)
2025–2026	Chindia Târgoviște	29	(3)
2026–	AGMK	10	(0)

International career
2007	Croatia U15	3	(1)
2008	Croatia U16	5	(0)
2008–2009	Croatia U17	4	(0)
2009	Croatia U18	3	(0)
2010	Croatia U19	2	(0)
- * Club domestic league appearances and goals as of 20 September 2026

Ivan Pešić (born 6 April 1992) is a Croatian professional footballer who plays as a left winger for Uzbekistan Super League club AGMK.

== Club career ==
Pešić started his youth career in NK Oluja, the club from his native village of Čista Velika. At the age of 12, he moved to the seaside NK Vodice for two seasons before moving on to the HNK Hajduk Split youth setup. A youth U-19 international, he remained at the club in his first senior year, but featured only in friendlies and a single Croatian Football Cup match, against Jadran Gunja. Released at the end of the season, he moved to Austria Klagenfurt, but after a single youth team and state cup match, he returned to Croatia, this time to HNK Šibenik in the Druga HNL.

Pešić's fledgling career was brought to a temporary halt by a traffic accident. After only 9 matches in the year and a half at Šibenik, Pešić had moved on to the Prva HNL team NK Zadar in early 2014. However, due to inflammation of his pubic bone, Pešić played in only 2 matches until the end of the season.

However, Pešić became a first-team regular the following (2014/15) season, under coach Miroslav Blažević. He would go on to amass four goals and eight assists from his preferred left wing position. This resulted in his transfer to RNK Split, having earned the reputation as one of the quickest players in the league.

After his club's relegation in the summer of 2017, Pešić rejoined HNK Hajduk Split.

In 2018, he joined Romanian club Dinamo București. He was loaned out at Shakhter Karagandy in 2019 and released by Dinamo in January 2020, after his return from Shakhter.

On 15 February 2020, Pešić signed for FC Kaisar.

On 20 February 2023, Pešić signed for FC Alashkert. Pešić left Alashkert on 17 June 2023.

17 July 2026 signed for FC AGMK.

== Honours ==
Kaisar

- Kazakhstan Super Cup runner-up: 2020
