= 2013 Kazakhstan Super Cup =

Shakhter Karagandy	Astana
3	2
- (AET)
- Date: 3 March 2013
- Venue: Astana Arena, Astana
- Referee: Igor Khisamutdinov
- Attendance: 11,200

The 2013 Kazakhstan Super Cup was the fifth Kazakhstan Super Cup, an annual football match played between the winners of the previous season's Premier League, Shakhter Karagandy, and the previous season's Kazakhstan Cup, Astana, with the Shakhter Karagandy winning 3–2. This was both teams second appearance in the Kazakhstan Super Cup.

== Match details ==
3 March 2013
17:00 UTC+06:00

Shakhter Karagandy	3 – 2 (a.e.t.)	Astana
Baizhanov 58'; Paryvayew 58'; Kukeyev 118'	Report	Kéthévoama 63'; Ostapenko 90'

Astana Arena, Astana
Attendance: 11,200
Referee: Igor Khisamutdinov

Shakhter Karagandy	Astana

GK	35	(Kazakhstan) Aleksandr Mokin
DF	4	(Bosnia and Herzegovina) Nikola Vasiljević
DF	17	(Belarus) Andrey Paryvayew	(yellow card) 110'
DF	25	(Kazakhstan) Serhiy Malyi	(yellow card) 104'
DF	87	(Serbia) Aleksandar Simčević
MF	7	(Kazakhstan) Maksat Baizhanov
MF	10	(Kazakhstan) Zhambyl Kukeyev	(yellow card) 118'	(substituted off) 119'
MF	88	(Colombia) Roger Cañas	(yellow card) 65'
FW	14	(Kazakhstan) Andrei Finonchenko		(substituted off) 80'
FW	18	(Kazakhstan) Daurenbek Tazhimbetov		(substituted off) 75'
FW	77	(Kazakhstan) Stanislav Lunin
Substitutes:
GK	31	(Kazakhstan) Serhiy Tkachuk
MF	3	(Lithuania) Gediminas Vičius		(substituted in) 80'
MF	8	(Slovenia) Borut Semler		(substituted in) 119'
FW	11	(Kazakhstan) Toktar Zhangylyshbay
DF	19	(Kazakhstan) Yevgeny Tarasov
DF	22	(Kazakhstan) Mikhail Gabyshev
FW	91	(Kazakhstan) Sergei Khizhnichenko		(substituted in) 91'
Manager:
(Russia) Viktor Kumykov

GK	1	(Serbia) Nenad Erić
DF	6	(Kazakhstan) Kairat Nurdauletov
DF	8	(Kazakhstan) Viktor Dmitrenko
DF	15	(Kazakhstan) Abzal Beisebekov
DF	21	(Kazakhstan) Aleksandr Kirov
DF	26	(Brazil) Zelão
MF	3	(Kazakhstan) Valeri Korobkin
MF	7	(Kazakhstan) Ulan Konysbayev		(substituted off) 58'
MF	10	(Central African Republic) Foxi Kéthévoama		(substituted off) 81'
FW	9	(Kazakhstan) Sergei Ostapenko
FW	28	(North Macedonia) Filip Ivanovski		(substituted off) 61'
Substitutes:
GK	18	(Kazakhstan) Vladimir Loginovsky
MF	13	(Moldova) Igor Țîgîrlaș		(substituted in) 81'
DF	16	(Kazakhstan) Yevgeni Goryachi
FW	17	(Kazakhstan) Tanat Nusserbayev	(yellow card) 120+1'	(substituted in) 61'
MF	20	(Montenegro) Damir Kojašević		(substituted in) 58'
MF	22	(Kazakhstan) Marat Shakhmetov
MF	23	(Kazakhstan) Islambek Kuat
Manager:
(Czech Republic) Miroslav Beránek

== See also ==
- 2012 Kazakhstan Premier League
- 2012 Kazakhstan Cup
