= 2016 Kazakhstan Super Cup =

| Astana | Kairat |
| 0 | 0 |
- Kairat won 5–4 on penalties
- Date: 8 March
- Venue: Astana Arena, Astana
- Referee: Ravshan Irmatov (Uzbekistan)
- Attendance: 14,500

2016 Kazakhstan Super Cup was a Kazakhstan football match that was played on 8 March 2016 between the champions of 2015 Kazakhstan Premier League, Astana, and the winner of the 2015 Kazakhstan Cup, Kairat.

This match was played on 8 March at the Astana Arena. Main and extra time of the match ended with goalless draw, and Kairat won the 2016 Kazakhstan Super Cup by a penalty shootout (5:4).

== Match details ==
8 March 2016
15:00 UTC+06:00

| Astana | 0 – 0 (a.e.t.) | Kairat |
|---|---|---|
| | Report |
Penalties
| Cañas (penalty scored); Aničić (penalty scored); Shchotkin (penalty missed); Maksimović (penalty missed); Twumasi (penalty scored); Beisebekov (penalty scored); Muzhikov (penalty missed) | 4 – 5 | (penalty scored) Islamkhan; (penalty scored) Soares; (penalty scored) Riera; (penalty missed) Li; (penalty missed) Gohou; (penalty scored) Tymoshchuk; (penalty scored) Tesák |

Astana Arena, Astana
Attendance: 14,500
Referee: Ravshan Irmatov (Uzbekistan)

| Astana | Kairat |

| GK | 1 | (Kazakhstan) Nenad Erić |
| DF | 5 | (Bosnia and Herzegovina) Marin Aničić |
| DF | 15 | (Kazakhstan) Abzal Beisebekov |
| DF | 44 | (Russia) Evgeni Postnikov | | (substituted off) 89' |
| DF | 77 | (Kazakhstan) Dmitri Shomko | (yellow card) 41' |
| MF | 6 | (Serbia) Nemanja Maksimović |
| MF | 7 | (Kazakhstan) Serikzhan Muzhikov |
| MF | 88 | (Colombia) Roger Cañas | (yellow card) 45+1' |
| FW | 17 | (Kazakhstan) Tanat Nusserbayev | | (substituted off) 107' |
| FW | 10 | (Serbia) Đorđe Despotović | | (substituted off) 89' |
| FW | 23 | (Ghana) Patrick Twumasi | (yellow card) 69' |
Substitutes:
| GK | 35 | (Kazakhstan) Aleksandr Mokin |
| GK | 47 | (Kazakhstan) Abylaikhan Duysen |
| DF | 4 | (Kazakhstan) Mark Gorman | | (substituted on) 89' |
| FW | 11 | (Kazakhstan) Aleksey Shchotkin | | (substituted on) 89' |
| MF | 12 | (Kazakhstan) Gevorg Najaryan |
| DF | 21 | (Kazakhstan) Berik Shaikhov | | (substituted on) 107' |
| DF | 28 | (Kazakhstan) Birzhan Kulbekov |
Manager:
(Bulgaria) Stanimir Stoilov

| GK | 1 | (Kazakhstan) Vladimir Plotnikov |
| DF | 4 | (Brazil) Bruno Soares |
| DF | 6 | (Serbia) Žarko Marković | (yellow card) 22' |
| DF | 13 | (Kazakhstan) Yermek Kuantayev |
| MF | 5 | (Slovakia) Lukáš Tesák | (yellow card) 90+2' |
| MF | 8 | (Russia) Mikhail Bakayev |
| MF | 9 | (Kazakhstan) Bauyrzhan Islamkhan |
| MF | 10 | (Brazil) Isael | | (substituted off) 106' |
| MF | 17 | (Kazakhstan) Aslan Darabayev | | (substituted off) 65' |
| MF | 44 | (Ukraine) Anatoliy Tymoshchuk | (yellow card) 103' |
| FW | 11 | (Ghana) Gerard Gohou |
Substitutes:
| GK | 16 | (Kazakhstan) Andrei Sidelnikov |
| GK | 25 | (Kazakhstan) Vladimir Groshev |
| DF | 2 | (Kazakhstan) Timur Rudoselskiy |
| MF | 3 | (Kazakhstan) Yan Vorogovskiy |
| FW | 15 | (Spain) Sito Riera | | (substituted on) 106' |
| MF | 18 | (Kazakhstan) Vitali Li | | (substituted on) 65' |
| MF | 22 | (Kazakhstan) Madiyar Raimbek |
Manager:
(Russia) Aleksandr Borodyuk

== See also ==
- 2015 Kazakhstan Premier League
- 2015 Kazakhstan Cup
