= Aldin Đidić =

Bosnian football manager (born 1983)

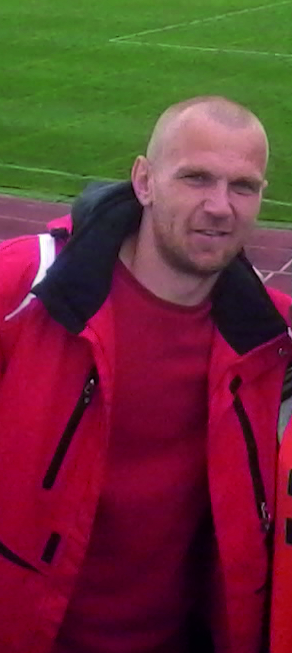
- Đidić with Shakhter Karagandy in 2013

Personal information
- Date of birth: 30 August 1983 (age 43)
- Place of birth: Zenica, SFR Yugoslavia
- Height: 1.97 m (6 ft 6 in)
- Position: Defender

Youth career
- –2001: Čelik Zenica

Senior career*
Years	Team	Apps	(Gls)
2001–2004	Čelik Zenica	63	(1)
2004–2005	Posušje	13	(0)
2005–2007	Žepče	23	(1)
2007	Interblock Ljubljana	21	(0)
2007–2008	KAMAZ	6	(0)
2008–2010	Baltika Kaliningrad	106	(0)
2010–2016	Shakhter Karagandy	130	(12)
2016	Čelik Zenica	9	(1)
2016	Sloboda Tuzla	7	(0)
Total		478	(15)

Managerial career
- 2022–2023: Famos Hrasnica
- 2024: Goražde
- 2026: Budućnost Banovići
- * Club domestic league appearances and goals

Aldin Đidić (born 30 August 1983) is a Bosnian football manager and former player.

== Club career ==
Đidić was born in Zenica. He had his biggest success with Kazakhstani club Shakhter Karagandy, winning the Kazakhstan Premier League in 2011 and 2012, the Kazakhstan Cup in 2013 and the Kazakhstan Super Cup in 2013.

== Career statistics ==
Appearances and goals by club, season and competition
Club	Season	League			Cup		Continental		Other (Note: Includes Kazakhstan Super Cup)		Total	
Club	Season	Division	Apps	Goals	Apps	Goals	Apps	Goals	Apps	Goals	Apps	Goals
Shakhter Karagandy	2010	Kazakhstan Premier League	27	8	3	0	–		2	1	32	9
Shakhter Karagandy	2011	Kazakhstan Premier League	31	1	2	0	–		4	0	37	1
Shakhter Karagandy	2012	Kazakhstan Premier League	24	2	4	1	1	0	2	0	31	3
Shakhter Karagandy	2013	Kazakhstan Premier League	16	2	3	0	0	0	11	1	30	3
Shakhter Karagandy	2014	Kazakhstan Premier League	6	0	2	0	–		–		8	0
Shakhter Karagandy	2015	Kazakhstan Premier League	27	1	1	0	–		–		28	1
Shakhter Karagandy	Total		131	14	15	1	1	0	19	2	166	16
Career total			131	14	15	1	1	0	19	2	166	16

== Honours ==
=== Player ===
Shakhter Karagandy

- Kazakhstan Premier League: 2011, 2012
- Kazakhstan Cup: 2013
- Kazakhstan Super Cup: 2013
