= Aleksandr Borodyuk =

Russian footballer (born 1962)

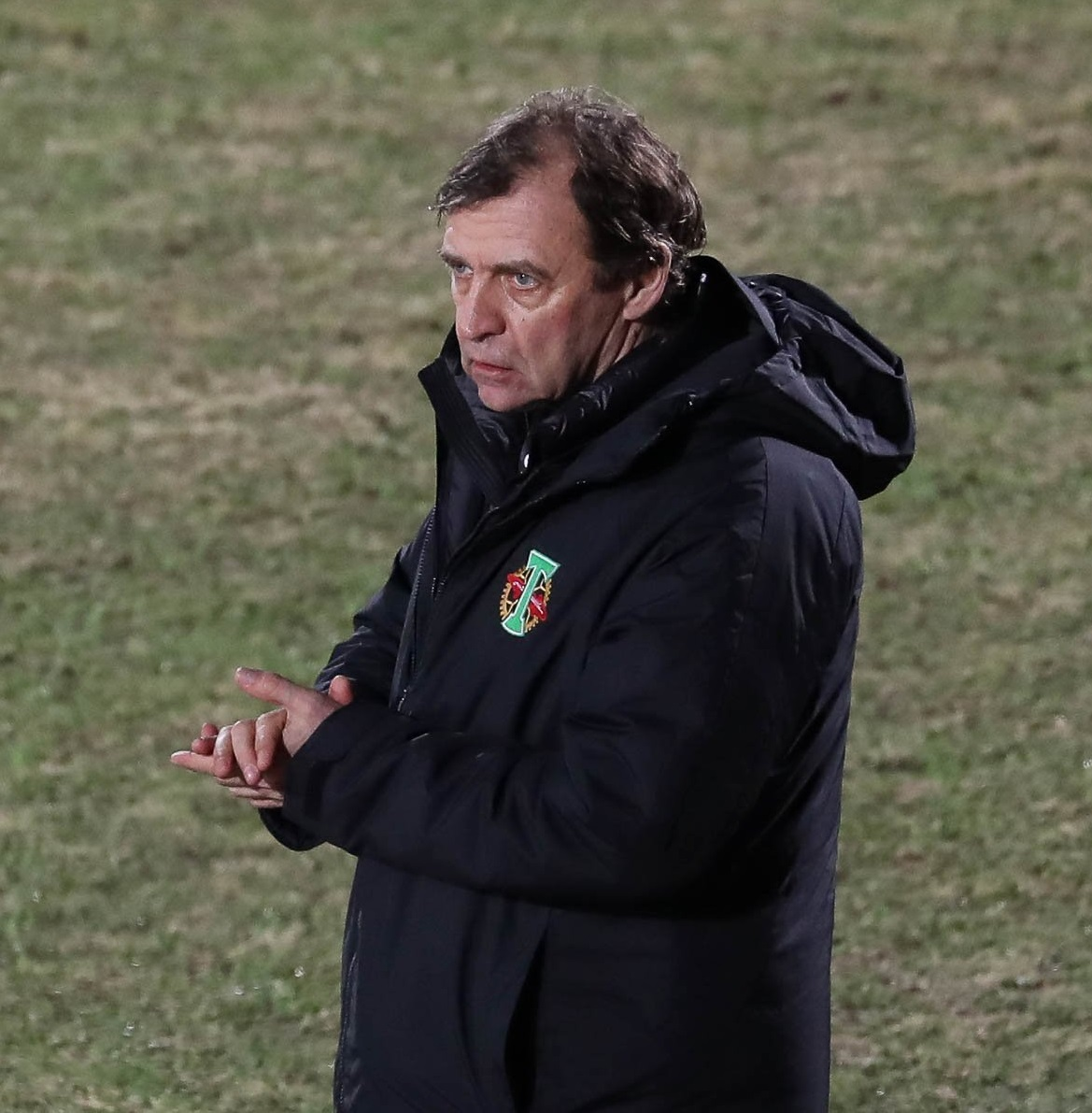
- Borodyuk with Torpedo Moscow in 2021

Personal information
- Full name: Aleksandr Genrikhovich Borodyuk
- Date of birth: 30 November 1962 (age 63)
- Place of birth: Voronezh, Russian SFSR, Soviet Union
- Height: 1.84 m (6 ft 0 in)
- Positions: Attacking midfielder; forward

Team information
- Current team: Academy Lokomotiv Moscow (senior coach)

Youth career
- Fakel Voronezh

Senior career*
Years	Team	Apps	(Gls)
1979	Fakel Voronezh	0	(0)
1980–1981	Dynamo Vologda	30	(4)
1982–1989	Dynamo Moscow	187	(53)
1989–1993	Schalke 04	124	(41)
1994–1995	SC Freiburg	20	(2)
1996	Hannover 96	16	(3)
1997–1999	Lokomotiv Moscow	32	(13)
1999	Torpedo-ZIL Moscow	12	(1)
2000	Krylia Sovetov Samara	20	(1)
Total		445	(118)

International career
1987–1989	USSR (Olympic)	6	(1)
1989–1991	USSR	7	(1)
1992–1994	Russia	8	(4)

Managerial career
- 2001–2002: Krylia Sovetov Samara (assistant)
- 2002–2005: Russia (assistant)
- 2005–2006: Russia (caretaker)
- 2005–2007: Russia U21
- 2007–2012: Russia (assistant)
- 2013–2014: Torpedo Moscow
- 2015–2016: FC Kairat
- 2017–2018: Kazakhstan
- 2020: SV Horn
- 2021–2022: Torpedo Moscow
- 2024–: Academy Lokomotiv Moscow (senior coach)
Medal record
Men's football
Representing Soviet Union
Olympic Games
Gold medal – first place	1988 Seoul	Team
- * Club domestic league appearances and goals

Aleksandr Genrikhovich Borodyuk (Russian: Александр Генрихович Бородюк; born 30 November 1962) is a Russian football coach and former international player for USSR (playing one match in 1990 FIFA World Cup) and Russia (appearing twice in the 1994 edition).

== Playing career ==
Born in Voronezh, Borodyuk attended the Fakel Voronezh football school and spent one season with their senior team. He was conscripted to play for Dynamo Vologda, where he began playing football in the Soviet Second League, and transferred to FC Dynamo Moscow a year later. When the conscription term ended, Borodyuk stayed in Moscow and later achieved the rank of junior lieutenant. With Dynamo he won the Soviet Cup in 1984 and became the top scorer of the Soviet League in 1986 and 1988. Valery Gazzaev, Igor Dobrovolsky and Igor Kolyvanov were among his teammates.

In 1988, Borodyuk became Olympic champion. After Anatoly Byshovets became the manager of Dynamo, Borodyuk lost his place in the starting line-up and moved to Germany to play for FC Schalke 04, achieving promotion to the Bundesliga and ranking among the club league's topscorers from 1989 to 1993. In January 1994, however, he moved to SC Freiburg and finished third in the league in 1994–95, although he appeared in only seven league contests. In October 1995, Borodyuk changed sides again, joining 2. Bundesliga's Hannover 96. He scored the 30,000th goal in the Bundesliga.

Borodyuk returned to Russia at the age of 34 and was invited to FC Lokomotiv Moscow by Yuri Semin. With Lokomotiv he reached the semifinal of the UEFA Cup and won the Russian Cup in 1997. After stints with Torpedo-ZIL Moscow and Krylia Sovetov Samara, he retired aged 38, as a member of the Grigory Fedotov club.

== Managerial career ==
As a manager, Borodyuk began working as assistant coach, first with Aleksandr Tarkhanov in Krylia Sovetov, then with Georgi Yartsev in the Russia national team.

He was caretaker manager of the Russia national team from 6 December 2005 to June 2006, also serving as manager of Russia U21 team from December 2005 to February 2007. In February 2007 he became Guus Hiddink's assistant, as Boris Stukalov took the reins of the U-21s. When Hiddink was replaced by Dick Advocaat in 2010, Borodyuk remained the assistant with the team.

On 28 December 2015, Borodyuk was appointed as manager of FC Kairat, resigning on 5 April 2016 after a poor start to the season. In February 2017, Borodyuk became the manager of Kazakhstan national team, signing a three-year contract.

On 11 August 2020, he was hired by Austrian Football Second League club SV Horn. He was released from his contract on 23 September 2020 after just two games were played in the league season.

On 23 March 2021, he returned to Torpedo Moscow, now in the second-tier Russian Football National League. During his previous time in Torpedo, he led them to promotion to the Russian Premier League. Under his management, Torpedo won the 2021–22 Russian Football National League to secure the return to the Premier League on 21 May 2022. Torpedo only gained 1 point in their first 5 games after the return to the Premier League, and on 18 August 2022, Borodyuk left Torpedo by mutual consent.

== Managerial statistics ==
As of match played 8 October 2017

Team	From	To	Record				
Team	From	To	G	W	D	L	Win %
Kazakhstan	2017	2017	7	0	1	6	0.00

== International goals ==
No.	Date	Venue	Opponent	Score	Result	Competition
1.	8 September 1993	Budapest, Hungary	Hungary	3–1	3–1	1994 FIFA World Cup qualification
2.	2 February 1994	Oakland, United States	Mexico	1–0	4–1	Friendly
3.	2 February 1994	Oakland, United States	Mexico	3–1	4–1	Friendly
4.	2 February 1994	Oakland, United States	Mexico	4–1	4–1	Friendly

== Honours ==
=== As a player ===
Soviet Union

- Olympic Gold medal : 1988

Dynamo Moscow

- Soviet Cup : 1984

Schalke 04

- 2. Bundesliga : 1991

Lokomotiv Moscow

- Russian Cup : 1997

=== As a coach ===
Kaïrat Almaty

- Kazakhstan Super Cup : 2016

Torpedo Moscow

- Russian Football National League : 2021-22
