= Žarko Marković (footballer) =

Serbian footballer (born 1987)

Personal information
- Date of birth: 28 January 1987 (age 39)
- Place of birth: Belgrade, SFR Yugoslavia
- Height: 2.04 m (6 ft 8 in)
- Position: Centre-back

Youth career
- Red Star Belgrade

Senior career*
Years	Team	Apps	(Gls)
2004–2006	Sopot	59	(4)
2006–2008	BASK	38	(5)
2008–2013	Gaz Metan Mediaş	103	(6)
2014–2018	Kairat	84	(9)
2019	Inđija	1	(0)
2019–2020	Radnik Surdulica	15	(0)
2020–2021	Radnički Niš	21	(4)
2021	Železničar Pančevo	4	(0)
2021–2022	Omladinac Novi Banovci		
- * Club domestic league appearances and goals as of 17 September 2021

Žarko Marković (Serbian Cyrillic: Жapкo Mapкoвић; born 28 January 1987) is a Serbian retired footballer who played as a centre-back.

== Career ==
On 20 December 2013, Marković signed a three-year contract with Kairat, extending his contract with Kairat on 26 October 2016 until the end of 2018. On 13 November 2017, Kairat announced that Marković had left the club by mutual agreement.

On 17 September 2021, he joined Omladinac Novi Banovci.

== Career statistics ==
As of match played 17 March 2021

Appearances and goals by club, season and competition
Club	Season	League			National cup		Continental		Other		Total	
Club	Season	Division	Apps	Goals	Apps	Goals	Apps	Goals	Apps	Goals	Apps	Goals
Sopot	2004–05	Serbian League Belgrade	17	2	0	0	–		–		17	2
Sopot	2005–06	Serbian League Belgrade	29	2	0	0	–		–		29	2
Sopot	2006–07	Serbian League Belgrade	3	0	0	0	–		–		3	2
Sopot	Total		59	4	0	0	0	0	0	0	59	4
BASK	2006–07	Serbian First League	18	1	0	0	–		–		18	1
BASK	2007–08	Serbian League Belgrade	20	4	0	0	–		–		20	4
BASK	Total		38	5	0	0	0	0	0	0	38	5
Gaz Metan Mediaş	2008–09	Liga I	19	1	0	0	–		–		19	1
Gaz Metan Mediaş	2009–10	Liga I	11	1	1	0	–		–		12	1
Gaz Metan Mediaş	2010–11	Liga I	16	1	1	0	–		–		17	1
Gaz Metan Mediaş	2011–12	Liga I	23	2	4	1	5	0	–		32	3
Gaz Metan Mediaş	2012–13	Liga I	24	0	1	0	–		–		25	0
Gaz Metan Mediaş	2013–14	Liga I	10	1	1	1	–		–		11	2
Gaz Metan Mediaş	Total		103	6	8	2	5	0	0	0	116	8
Kairat	2014	Kazakhstan Premier League	18	3	3	0	0	0	–		21	3
Kairat	2015	Kazakhstan Premier League	29	2	4	0	7	0	1	0	41	2
Kairat	2016	Kazakhstan Premier League	28	2	3	0	4	0	1	0	36	2
Kairat	2017	Kazakhstan Premier League	9	2	1	0	0	0	1	0	11	2
Kairat	Total		84	9	11	0	11	0	3	0	109	9
Inđija	2019–20	Serbian SuperLiga	1	0	0	0	–		–		1	0
Radnik Surdulica	2019–20	Serbian SuperLiga	15	0	1	0	–		–		16	0
Radnički Niš	2020–21	Serbian SuperLiga	19	4	2	0	–		–		21	4
Career total			319	28	22	2	16	0	3	0	360	30

== Honours ==
Kairat

- Kazakhstan Cup (3): 2014, 2015, 2017
- Kazakhstan Super Cup (2): 2016, 2017
