= Sito Riera =

Spanish footballer (born 1987)

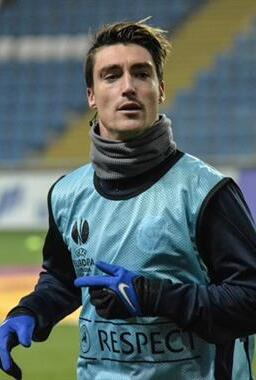
- Riera in 2013

Personal information
- Full name: Llorenç Riera Ortega
- Date of birth: 5 January 1987 (age 39)
- Place of birth: Manacor, Spain
- Height: 1.84 m (6 ft 0 in)
- Position: Attacking midfielder

Team information
- Current team: Manacor
- Number: 22

Youth career
- Mallorca
- 1998–2005: Barcelona

Senior career*
Years	Team	Apps	(Gls)
2005–2006	Barcelona C	5	(0)
2005–2007	Barcelona B	64	(16)
2007–2009	Espanyol B	29	(0)
2008–2009	→ Panthrakikos (loan)	28	(5)
2009–2011	Panionios	53	(7)
2012–2014	Chornomorets	37	(3)
2014–2016	Kairat	41	(4)
2016–2018	Śląsk Wrocław	45	(0)
2018–2020	Enosis Neon Paralimni	44	(5)
2020–2022	AEL Limassol	55	(6)
2022–2023	Anagennisi Karditsa	7	(0)
2023	Talavera	11	(0)
2023–	Manacor	77	(10)
- * Club domestic league appearances and goals as of 21:48, 11 March 2026 (UTC)

Llorenç "Sito" Riera Ortega (born 5 January 1987) is a Spanish professional footballer who plays as an attacking midfielder for Tercera Federación club Manacor.

A youth and reserve player at Barcelona and Espanyol, he never featured professionally in his own country, going on to spend over a decade abroad. He played top-flight football in Greece, Ukraine, Kazakhstan, Poland and Cyprus.

== Career ==
Born in Manacor, Balearic Islands, Riera represented both major clubs in Barcelona, FC Barcelona and Espanyol, but never made it past their reserve sides. In the 2007–08 season, he suffered relegation from the Segunda División B with the latter, failing to score any goals in the process.

On 8 July 2009, after a loan experience with Panthrakikos, Riera signed for Panionios also of the Super League Greece. On 14 December 2011, he left by mutual consent.

Riera left Chornomorets Odesa – where he spent one and a half years, earning a late red card in his last game for the team, a 1–0 away win against PSV Eindhoven in the group stage of the UEFA Europa League– at the start of March 2014, due to the civil unrest caused by the Ukrainian revolution. He moved to Kazakhstan on 23 June, signing a three-and-a-half-year contract with Kairat.

On 1 April 2016, after three seasons of irregular playing time, Riera left the Almaty Central Stadium. He resumed his career that August with Śląsk Wrocław in the Polish Ekstraklasa, on a two-year deal.

After his stint in Poland, Riera moved to the Cypriot First Division, where he represented Enosis Neon Paralimni and AEL Limassol.

== Personal life ==
Riera's older brother Albert was also a footballer. A winger, he represented, amongst others, Espanyol, Liverpool and the Spain national team.

== Career statistics ==
As of match played on 7 May 2022

Appearances and goals by club, season and competition
Club	Season	League			National cup		League cup		Other		Total	
Club	Season	Division	Apps	Goals	Apps	Goals	Apps	Goals	Apps	Goals	Apps	Goals
Panthrakikos (loan)	2008–09	Super League Greece	28	5	0	0	—		—		28	5
Panionios	2009–10	Super League Greece	25	4	1	1	—		—		26	5
Panionios	2010–11	Super League Greece	22	2	1	1	—		—		23	3
Panionios	2011–12	Super League Greece	6	1	0	0	—		—		6	1
Panionios	Total		53	7	2	2	0	0	0	0	55	9
Chornomorets	2011–12	Ukrainian Premier League	9	0	1	0	—		—		10	0
Chornomorets	2012–13	Ukrainian Premier League	12	0	3	0	—		—		15	0
Chornomorets	2013–14	Ukrainian Premier League	16	3	0	0	—		13	1	29	4
Chornomorets	Total		37	3	4	0	0	0	13	1	54	4
Kairat	2014	Kazakhstan Premier League	12	1	3	1	—		1	0	16	2
Kairat	2015	Kazakhstan Premier League	27	3	3	1	—		7	0	37	4
Kairat	2016	Kazakhstan Premier League	2	0	0	0	—		1	0	3	0
Kairat	Total		41	4	6	2	0	0	9	0	56	6
Śląsk Wrocław	2016–17	Ekstraklasa	22	0	1	0	—		—		23	0
Śląsk Wrocław	2017–18	Ekstraklasa	23	0	0	0	—		—		23	0
Śląsk Wrocław	Total		45	0	1	0	0	0	0	0	46	0
Enosis Neon Paralimni	2018–19	Cypriot First Division	25	4	6	0	—		—		31	4
Enosis Neon Paralimni	2019–20	Cypriot First Division	19	1	2	1	—		—		21	2
Enosis Neon Paralimni	Total		44	5	8	1	0	0	0	0	52	6
AEL Limassol	2020–21	Cypriot First Division	30	6	6	1	—		—		36	7
AEL Limassol	2021–22	Cypriot First Division	25	0	4	0	—		4	0	33	0
AEL Limassol	Total		55	6	10	1	0	0	4	0	69	7
Career total			303	30	31	1	0	0	26	1	360	37

== Honours ==
Kairat

- Kazakhstan Cup: 2014, 2015
- Kazakhstan Super Cup: 2016
