= Ivan Mayewski =

Belarusian footballer (born 1988)

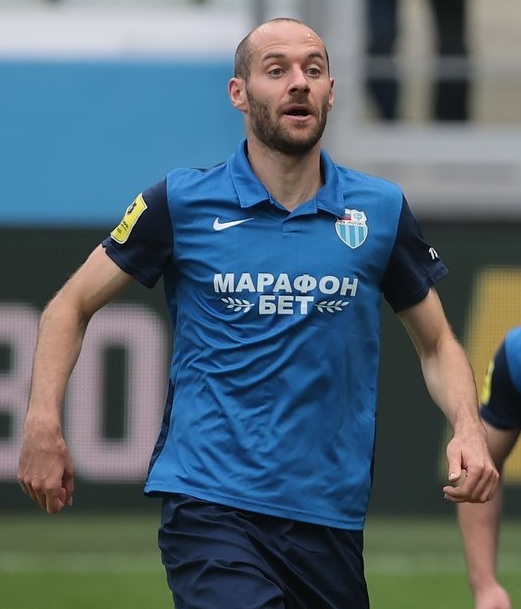
- Mayewski with Rotor Volgograd in 2021

Personal information
- Full name: Ivan Aleksandrovich Mayewski
- Date of birth: 5 May 1988 (age 38)
- Place of birth: Magdeburg, East Germany
- Height: 1.89 m (6 ft 2 in)
- Position: Midfielder

Senior career*
Years	Team	Apps	(Gls)
2008	Vertikal Kalinkovichi	29	(5)
2009–2011	Partizan Minsk	63	(8)
2012–2014	Minsk	70	(4)
2015	Zawisza Bydgoszcz	18	(1)
2015–2016	Anzhi Makhachkala	32	(1)
2017–2020	Astana	96	(6)
2021	Rotor Volgograd	5	(0)
2021–2024	Celje	26	(2)
Total		339	(27)

International career
2015–2021	Belarus	42	(0)

Managerial career
- 2026: Celje
- * Club domestic league appearances and goals

Ivan Mayewski (Belarusian: Іван Маеўскі; Russian: Иван Маевский; born 5 May 1988) is a Belarusian professional football manager and former player who played as a midfielder. He was most recently in charge of Slovenian PrvaLiga club Celje.

== Club career ==
In January 2015, Mayewski joined Polish Ekstraklasa club Zawisza Bydgoszcz.

On 7 July 2015, Mayewski signed for Anzhi Makhachkala on a three-year contract.

On 26 January 2017, Mayewski moved to Astana. On 20 December 2019, Mayewski signed a new one-year contract with Astana, with the option of an additional year. On 29 December 2020, Astana confirmed that Mayewski had left the club following the expiration of his contract.

On 13 January 2021, he signed with Russian Premier League club Rotor Volgograd.

On 13 July 2021, Mayewski joined Slovenian PrvaLiga side Celje.

== International career ==
On 27 March 2015, Mayewski made his international debut for Belarus in a 2016 UEFA European Football Championship qualifier against Macedonia.

== Career statistics ==
=== Club ===
As of match played 17 March 2021

Appearances and goals by club, season and competition
Club	Season	League			National cup (Note: Includes Belarusian Cup, Russian Cup)		Continental		Other		Total	
Club	Season	Division	Apps	Goals	Apps	Goals	Apps	Goals	Apps	Goals	Apps	Goals
FC Minsk	2012	Belarusian Premier League	23	1	3	0	—		—		26	1
FC Minsk	2013	Belarusian Premier League	24	0	3	0	3 (Note: Appearances in UEFA Europa League)	0	—		30	0
FC Minsk	2014	Belarusian Premier League	23	3	3	0	—		1 (Note: Appearance in Belarusian Super Cup)	0	27	3
FC Minsk	Total		70	4	9	0	3	0	1	0	83	4
Zawisza Bydgoszcz	2014–15	Ekstraklasa	18	1	0	0	—		—		18	1
Anzhi Makhachkala	2015–16	Russian Premier League	18	0	0	0	—		2 (Note: Appearances in Russian Premier League relegation play-offs)	0	20	0
Anzhi Makhachkala	2016–17	Russian Premier League	14	1	2	0	—		—		16	1
Anzhi Makhachkala	Total		32	1	2	0	0	0	2	0	36	1
Astana	2017	Kazakhstan Premier League	30	3	0	0	12 (Note: Six appearances and one goal in UEFA Champions League, six appearances in UEFA Europa League)	1	1 (Note: Appearance in Kazakhstan Super Cup)	0	43	4
Astana	2018	Kazakhstan Premier League	25	0	0	0	16 (Note: Six appearances in UEFA Champions League, ten appearances in UEFA Europa League)	0	1	1	42	1
Astana	2019	Kazakhstan Premier League	26	2	0	0	14 (Note: Two appearances in UEFA Champions League, twelve appearances in UEFA Europa League)	0	1	0	41	2
Astana	2020	Kazakhstan Premier League	15	1	0	0	2 (Note: One appearance in UEFA Champions League, one appearance in UEFA Europa League)	0	1	0	18	1
Astana	Total		96	6	0	0	44	1	4	1	144	8
Rotor Volgograd	2020–21	Russian Premier League	4	0	0	0	—		—		4	0
Career total			220	12	11	0	46	1	8	1	285	14

=== International ===
Appearances and goals by national team and year
National team	Year	Apps	Goals
Belarus	2015	4	0
Belarus	2016	7	0
Belarus	2017	5	0
Belarus	2018	9	0
Belarus	2019	9	0
Belarus	2020	6	0
Belarus	2021	2	0
Total		42	0

== Honours ==
Minsk

- Belarusian Cup: 2012–13

Astana

- Kazakhstan Premier League: 2017, 2018, 2019
- Kazakhstan Super Cup: 2018, 2019, 2020

Celje

- Slovenian PrvaLiga: 2023–24
