= Yury Logvinenko =

Kazakhstani footballer

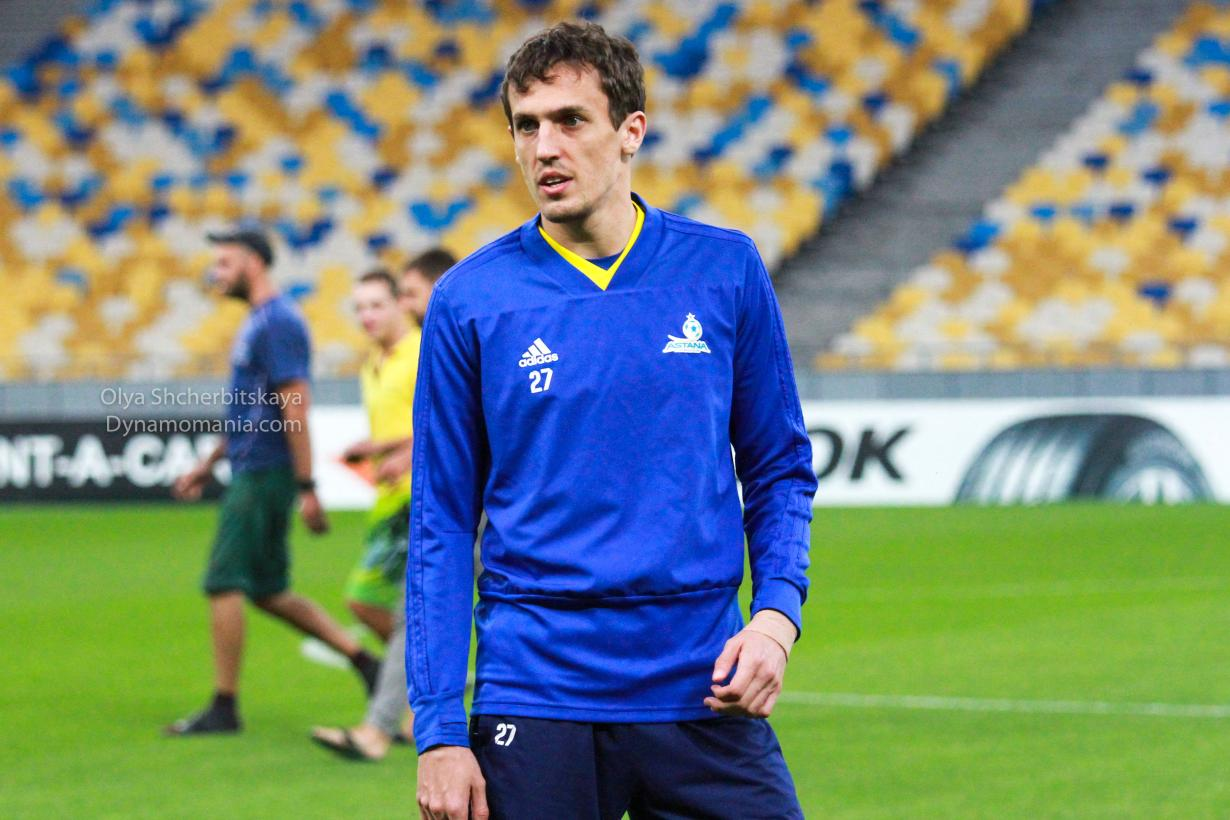

Personal information
- Full name: Yury Anatolyevich Logvinenko
- Date of birth: 22 July 1988 (age 38)
- Place of birth: Aktyubinsk, Kazakh SSR, Soviet Union
- Height: 1.87 m (6 ft 1 1/2 in)
- Position: Center back

Youth career
- Aktobe

Senior career*
Years	Team	Apps	(Gls)
2006–2016	Aktobe	228	(14)
2016–2021	Astana	99	(11)
2021	Rotor Volgograd	0	(0)
2021–2023	Aktobe	1	(0)
Total		328	(25)

International career
2008–2022	Kazakhstan	53	(5)
- * Club domestic league appearances and goals

Yury Anatolyevich Logvinenko (Russian: Юрий Анатольевич Логвиненко; born 22 July 1988) is a Kazakh former football player who played most of his career at Aktobe, and earned 53 caps for the Kazakhstan national football team.

== Career ==
=== Club career ===
Born in Aktyubinsk (now Aktobe), Logvinenko began his career with FC Aktobe and played for the club until 2016. The defender set the club record for most Premier League appearances, surpassing Samat Smakov, in August 2013.

On 31 January 2021, Logvinenko left Astana, to sign for Russian Premier League club Rotor Volgograd. On 22 March 2021, Rotor announced that Logvinenko had left the club by mutual consent due to injury.

On 5 May 2021, FC Aktobe announced the return of Logvinenko.

In January 2023, Logvinenko announced his retirement, noting that he was glad to end his playing career in his native club "Aktobe".

=== International career ===
As of October 2013, Logvinenko has made twenty appearances for the Kazakhstan national football team.

During the Euro 2016 qualifying campaign, he scored two goals against Czech Republic in a 2–4 defeat at home.

== Career statistics ==
=== Club ===
As of match played 14 May 2021

Club	Season	League			National Cup		Continental		Other		Total	
Club	Season	Division	Apps	Goals	Apps	Goals	Apps	Goals	Apps	Goals	Apps	Goals
Aktobe	2006	Kazakhstan Premier League	24	2	–	–	1	0	–		25	2
Aktobe	2007	Kazakhstan Premier League	16	2	–	–	-		–		16	2
Aktobe	2008	Kazakhstan Premier League	29	2	–	–	2	0	–		31	2
Aktobe	2009	Kazakhstan Premier League	25	0	–	–	6	0	–		31	0
Aktobe	2010	Kazakhstan Premier League	10	1	–	–	–		1	0	11	1
Aktobe	2011	Kazakhstan Premier League	28	0	–	–	4	0	–		32	0
Aktobe	2012	Kazakhstan Premier League	21	1	4	0	4	0	–		29	1
Aktobe	2013	Kazakhstan Premier League	26	4	3	0	6	0	–		35	4
Aktobe	2014	Kazakhstan Premier League	22	2	4	1	3	0	1	0	30	3
Aktobe	2015	Kazakhstan Premier League	27	0	4	0	2	0	0	0	33	0
Aktobe	Total		228	14	15	1	28	0	2	0	273	15
Astana	2016	Kazakhstan Premier League	25	2	3	0	10	1	1	0	38	3
Astana	2017	Kazakhstan Premier League	29	4	1	0	10	1	1	0	41	5
Astana	2018	Kazakhstan Premier League	16	1	0	0	4	0	0	0	20	1
Astana	2019	Kazakhstan Premier League	15	3	0	0	12	2	1	0	28	5
Astana	2020	Kazakhstan Premier League	14	1	0	0	0	0	1	0	15	1
Astana	Total		99	11	4	0	36	4	4	0	142	15
Rotor Volgograd	2020–21	Russian Premier League	0	0	0	0	–		–		0	0
Aktobe	2021	Kazakhstan Premier League	1	0	0	0	–		–		1	0
Career total			328	25	19	1	64	4	5	0	417	30

=== International ===
As of match played 18 November 2020

Appearances and goals by national team and year
Kazakhstan national team
Year	Apps	Goals
2008	2	0
2009	6	0
2010	1	0
2011	4	0
2012	2	1
2013	5	0
2014	6	2
2015	8	1
2016	6	0
2017	4	0
2018	5	1
2019	2	0
2020	2	0
Total	53	5

=== International goals ===
Kazakhstan score listed first, score column indicates score after each Logvinenko goal.

International goals by date, venue, cap, opponent, score, result and competition
No.	Date	Venue	Cap	Opponent	Score	Result	Competition
1	1 June 2012	Central Stadium, Almaty, Kazakhstan	15	Kyrgyzstan	1–0	5–2	Friendly
2	13 October 2014	Astana Arena, Astana, Kazakhstan	25	Czech Republic	1–4	2–4	UEFA Euro 2016 qualification
3	13 October 2014	Astana Arena, Astana, Kazakhstan	25	Czech Republic	2–4	2–4	UEFA Euro 2016 qualification
4	3 September 2015	Doosan Arena, Plzeň, Czech Republic	31	Czech Republic	1–0	1–2	UEFA Euro 2016 qualification
5	10 September 2018	Estadi Nacional, Andorra la Vella, Andorra	46	Andorra	1–0	1–1	2018–19 UEFA Nations League D

== Honours ==
Aktobe

- Kazakhstan Premier League (4): 2007, 2008, 2009, 2013
- Kazakhstan Cup (1): 2008
- Kazakhstan Super Cup (3): 2008, 2010, 2014

Astana

- Kazakhstan Premier League (2): 2016, 2017
- Kazakhstan Cup (1): 2016
- Kazakhstan Super Cup (1): 2018
