= Aleksandr Mokin =

Kazakhstani footballer

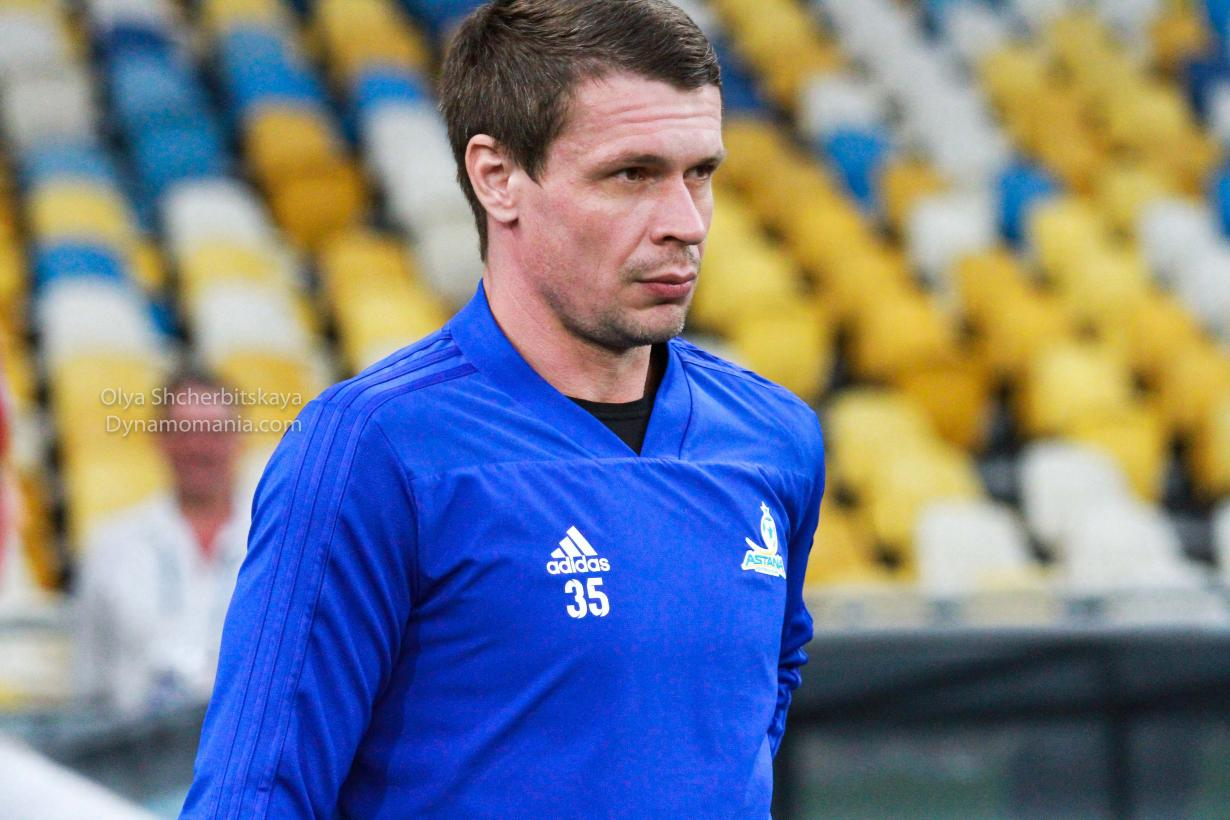

Personal information
- Full name: Aleksandr Valeryevich Mokin
- Date of birth: 19 June 1981 (age 45)
- Place of birth: Shymkent, Kazakh SSR, Soviet Union
- Height: 1.92 m (6 ft 4 in)
- Position: Goalkeeper

Team information
- Current team: Kaisar
- Number: 35

Senior career*
Years	Team	Apps	(Gls)
1999–2001	Ordabasy	22	(0)
2002–2008	Zhenis / Astana	30	(0)
2004	→ Okzhetpes (loan)	12	(0)
2007	→ Ordabasy (loan)	28	(0)
2008	→ Alma-Ata (loan)	11	(0)
2009–2010	Ordabasy	55	(0)
2011–2015	Shakhter Karagandy	112	(0)
2016–2018	Astana	39	(0)
2019	Irtysh Pavlodar	0	(0)
2019	Astana	5	(0)
2020–2022	Tobol	54	(0)
2024	Caspiy	9	(0)
2025–	Kaisar	0	(0)

International career^{‡}
2005–2021	Kazakhstan	22	(0)
- * Club domestic league appearances and goals as of 11 May 2025 ‡ National team caps and goals as of 5 January 2015

Aleksandr Valeryevich Mokin (Russian: Александр Валерьевич Мокин; born 19 June 1981) is a Kazakh professional footballer who plays as a goalkeeper for Kaisar.

== Career ==
=== Club ===
Mokin started his career with Ordabasy.

On 23 February 2016, Mokin signed for Kazakhstan Premier League Champions FC Astana.

On 4 January 2019, Mokin signed for Irtysh Pavlodar, but left the club on 16 January 2019 citing family reasons. Mokin was released by Astana on 6 January 2020 after his contract expired.

On 22 February 2020, Mokin signed for Tobol. In February 2023, Mokin left «Tobol».

== Career statistics ==
=== Club ===
As of match played 10 November 2019

Appearances and goals by club, season and competition
Club	Season	League			National Cup		Continental		Other		Total	
Club	Season	Division	Apps	Goals	Apps	Goals	Apps	Goals	Apps	Goals	Apps	Goals
Ordabasy	1999	Kazakhstan Premier League	3	0			–		–		3	0
Ordabasy	2000	Kazakhstan Premier League	2	0			–		–		2	0
Ordabasy	2001	Kazakhstan Premier League	17	0			–		–		17	0
Ordabasy	Total		22	0			-	-	-	-	22+	0
Zhenis Astana	2002	Kazakhstan Premier League	1	0			–		–		1	0
Zhenis Astana	2003	Kazakhstan Premier League	4	0			–		–		4	0
Zhenis Astana	2004	Kazakhstan Premier League	9	0	1	0	–		–		10	0
Zhenis Astana	2005	Kazakhstan Premier League	4	0	1	0	–		–		5	0
Astana	2006	Kazakhstan Premier League	7	0	5	0	–		–		12	0
Astana	2007	Kazakhstan Premier League	0	0	0	0	–		–		0	0
Astana	2008	Kazakhstan Premier League	5	0	2	0	–		–		7	0
Astana	Total		30	0	9+	0	-	-	-	-	59+	0
Okzhetpes (loan)	2004	Kazakhstan Premier League	12	0	1	0	–		–		13	0
Ordabasy (loan)	2007	Kazakhstan Premier League	28	0	6	0	–		–		34	0
Alma-Ata (loan)	2008	Kazakhstan Premier League	11	0	2	0	–		–		13	0
Ordabasy	2009	Kazakhstan Premier League	26	0	2	0	-		-		28	0
Ordabasy	2010	Kazakhstan Premier League	29	0	4	0	-		-		33	0
Ordabasy	Total		55	0	6	0	-	-	-	-	61	0
Shakhter Karagandy	2011	Kazakhstan Premier League	31	0	0	0	4	0	-		35	0
Shakhter Karagandy	2012	Kazakhstan Premier League	25	0	4	0	2	0	1	0	32	0
Shakhter Karagandy	2013	Kazakhstan Premier League	18	0	0	0	10	0	1	0	29	0
Shakhter Karagandy	2014	Kazakhstan Premier League	26	0	3	0	6	0	1	0	36	0
Shakhter Karagandy	2015	Kazakhstan Premier League	12	0	0	0	-		-		12	0
Shakhter Karagandy	Total		102	0	7	0	22	0	3	0	134	0
Astana	2016	Kazakhstan Premier League	2	0	5	0	1	0	0	0	8	0
Astana	2017	Kazakhstan Premier League	24	0	0	0	5	0	0	0	29	0
Astana	2018	Kazakhstan Premier League	13	0	0	0	0	0	0	0	13	0
Astana	Total		39	0	5	0	6	0	0	0	50	0
Irtysh Pavlodar	2019	Kazakhstan Premier League	0	0	0	0	–		–		0	0
Astana	2019	Kazakhstan Premier League	5	0	1	0	1	0	0	0	7	0
Career total			252	0	28	0	29	0	3	0	312	0

=== International ===
As of match played 28 March 2021.

National team	Year	Apps	Goals
Kazakhstan
Kazakhstan	2005	1	0
Kazakhstan	2006	1	0
Kazakhstan	2007	0	0
Kazakhstan	2008	3	0
Kazakhstan	2009	6	0
Kazakhstan	2010	0	0
Kazakhstan	2011	2	0
Kazakhstan	2012	0	0
Kazakhstan	2013	3	0
Kazakhstan	2014	5	0
Kazakhstan	2015	0	0
Kazakhstan	2016	0	0
Kazakhstan	2017	0	0
Kazakhstan	2018	0	0
Kazakhstan	2019	0	0
Kazakhstan	2020	0	0
Kazakhstan	2021	1	0
Total		22	0

== Honours ==
Zhenis Astana/Astana

- Kazakhstan Premier League: 2006
- Kazakhstan Cup: 2002, 2005

Shakhter Karagandy

- Kazakhstan Premier League: 2011, 2012
- Kazakhstan Cup: 2013
- Kazakhstan Super Cup: 2013

Astana

- Kazakhstan Premier League: 2016, 2017, 2018, 2019
- Kazakhstan Cup: 2016
- Kazakhstan Super Cup: 2018, 2019

Tobol/Tobol

- Kazakhstan Super Cup: 2021
