= Abzal Beysebekov =

Kazakhstani footballer

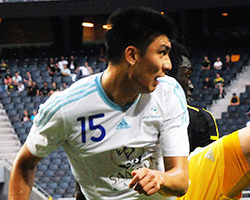
- Beysebekov in 2014

Personal information
- Full name: Abzal Talgatuly Beysebekov
- Date of birth: 30 November 1992 (age 33)
- Place of birth: Almaty, Kazakhstan
- Height: 1.87 m (6 ft 1 1/2 in)
- Position: Midfielder

Team information
- Current team: Astana
- Number: 15

Youth career
- Kairat

Senior career*
Years	Team	Apps	(Gls)
2008	Kairat	5	(0)
2009	Astana	9	(1)
2010	Kairat	11	(0)
2011	Vostok	23	(0)
2012–	Astana	332	(14)
2014	→ Korona Kielce (loan)	4	(1)
2014	→ Korona Kielce II (loan)	3	(0)

International career^{‡}
2008	Kazakhstan U17	3	(0)
2009–2010	Kazakhstan U19	6	(1)
2010–2014	Kazakhstan U21	19	(3)
2014–	Kazakhstan	49	(0)
- * Club domestic league appearances and goals as of 1 November 2026 ‡ National team caps and goals as of 21 March 2024

Abzal Talgatuly Beysebekov (Kazakh: Абзал Талғатұлы Бейсебеков, Abzal Talğatūly Beisebekov; born 30 November 1992) is a Kazakh professional footballer who plays as a midfielder for Kazakhstan Premier League club Astana.

== Career ==
=== Club career ===
Beysebekov began his career in 2008 with FC Kairat of the Kazakhstan Premier League, at the age of fifteen. Although he initially played as a forward, he was later frequently deployed as a defender owing to a league regulation, commonly referred to as the "limitchik" rule, which required each side to field at least one player under the age of twenty-one. Limitchik players tended to be placed in "less risky" positions, such as full-back, and the technically and physically accomplished Beysebekov filled this role for several seasons, while continuing to appear as a forward for the Kazakhstan under-21 side.

In February 2014, Beysebekov joined the Polish club Korona Kielce on a six-month loan, following fellow Kazakhstan international Sergei Khizhnichenko. Beysebekov scored his first, and only, goal for Korona in a 4–4 draw with Jagiellonia Białystok on 27 May 2014.

Prior to the start of the 2021 season, Beysebekov was appointed captain of Astana. On 4 May 2024, he made his 400th appearance for Astana.

=== International career ===
Beysebekov represented Kazakhstan at every national youth level between 2008 and 2013.

== Statistics ==
=== Club ===
As of match played 23 August 2025

Appearances and goals by club, season and competition
Club	Season	League			National Cup		Continental		Other		Total	
Club	Season	Division	Apps	Goals	Apps	Goals	Apps	Goals	Apps	Goals	Apps	Goals
Kairat	2008	Kazakhstan Premier League	5	0	0	0	—		—		5	0
Lokomotiv Astana	2009	Kazakhstan Premier League	9	1	3	0	—		—		12	1
Kairat	2010	Kazakhstan Premier League	11	0	1	0	—		—		12	0
Vostok	2011	Kazakhstan Premier League	23	0	0	0	—		—		23	0
Astana	2012	Kazakhstan Premier League	13	0	6	0	—		—		5	0
Astana	2013	Kazakhstan Premier League	29	0	1	0	2 (Note: Appearances in UEFA Europa League)	0	1 (Note: Appearances in Kazakhstan Super Cup)	0	33	0
Astana	2014	Kazakhstan Premier League	15	1	3	0	8	1	—		26	2
Astana	2015	Kazakhstan Premier League	29	1	5	0	8 (Note: Appearances in UEFA Champions League)	0	1	0	43	1
Astana	2016	Kazakhstan Premier League	22	0	3	0	11 (Note: Three appearances in UEFA Champions League, eight appearances in UEFA Europa League)	0	1	0	37	0
Astana	2017	Kazakhstan Premier League	27	0	1	1	10 (Note: Five appearances in UEFA Champions League, five appearances in UEFA Europa League)	0	1	0	39	1
Astana	2018	Kazakhstan Premier League	28	0	0	0	5	0	1	0	34	0
Astana	2019	Kazakhstan Premier League	30	2	1	0	9 (Note: Two appearances in UEFA Champions League, seven appearances in UEFA Europa League)	0	1	0	41	2
Astana	2020	Kazakhstan Premier League	17	1	0	0	2 (Note: One appearance and one goal in UEFA Champions League, one appearance in UEFA Europa League)	1	1	0	20	2
Astana	2021	Kazakhstan Premier League	24	5	4	0	4 (Note: Appearances in UEFA Europa Conference League)	0	2	0	34	5
Astana	2022	Kazakhstan Premier League	18	1	4	0	0	0	—		22	1
Astana	2023	Kazakhstan Premier League	17	2	5	0	12 (Note: Three appearance and one goal in UEFA Champions League, two appearance in UEFA Europa League, seven appearances and one goal in the UEFA Europa Conference League)	2	1	0	36	4
Astana	2024	Kazakhstan Premier League	13	0	0	0	2	0	4 (Note: Appearances in the Kazakhstan League Cup)	0	19	0
Astana	2025	Kazakhstan Premier League	19	1	2	0	4	0	—		25	1
Astana	Astana Total		301	14	35	1	77	4	14	0	427	19
Korona Kielce (loan)	2013–14	Ekstraklasa	4	1	—		—		—		4	1
Korona Kielce II (loan)	2013–14	III liga	3	0	—		—		—		3	0
Career total			356	16	39	1	77	4	14	0	486	21

=== International ===
Kazakhstan
Year	Apps	Goals
2014	1	0
2015	3	0
2016	5	0
2017	6	0
2018	9	0
2019	4	0
2020	5	0
2021	1	0
Total	34	0

Statistics accurate as of match played 4 June 2021

== Honours ==
Astana

- Kazakhstan Premier League: 2014, 2015, 2016, 2017, 2018, 2019, 2022
- Kazakhstan Cup: 2012, 2016
- Kazakhstan League Cup: 2024
- Kazakhstan Super Cup: 2015, 2018, 2019, 2020, 2023
