= Roman Murtazayev =

Kazakhstani footballer

Personal information
- Full name: Roman Valeryevich Murtazayev
- Date of birth: 10 September 1993 (age 33)
- Place of birth: Karaganda, Kazakhstan
- Height: 1.85 m (6 ft 1 in)
- Position: Forward

Team information
- Current team: Yelimay
- Number: 7

Senior career*
Years	Team	Apps	(Gls)
2012–2015	Shakhter Karagandy	66	(9)
2015–2016	Irtysh Pavlodar	32	(18)
2016–2019	Astana	92	(21)
2020	Tobol	17	(2)
2021	Astana	18	(4)
2021	Baltika Kaliningrad	11	(0)
2022–2023	Shakhter Karagandy	42	(8)
2024–	Yelimay	71	(21)

International career^{‡}
2016–	Kazakhstan	26	(3)
- * Club domestic league appearances and goals as of 1 November 2026 ‡ National team caps and goals as of 15:52, 6 June 2026 (UTC)

Roman Valeryevich Murtazayev (Russian: Роман Валерьевич Муртазаев; born 10 September 1993) is a Kazakh footballer who plays for Yelimay and the Kazakhstan national football team.

== Career ==
=== Club ===
In December 2015, Murtazayev signed for FC Irtysh Pavlodar.

On 24 August 2016, FC Astana announced that they had signed Murtazayev to a three-year contract, from the end of the 2016 season. Murtazayev left Astana at the end of his contract on 25 December 2019.

On 7 February 2020, FC Tobol announced the signing of Murtazayev on a one-year contract.

On 23 February 2021, Murtazayev returned to FC Astana. On 16 July 2021, Murtazayev left Astana by mutual consent. After leaving Astana Murtazayev signed a one-year contract, with the option of an additional year, with Baltika Kaliningrad on 28 July 2021. On 1 December 2021, his contract with Baltika was terminated by mutual consent.

On 11 January 2022, Murtazayev re-signed for Shakhter Karagandy.

On 2 January 2024, Yelimay announced the signing of Murtazayev.

== Career statistics ==
=== Club ===
As of match played 14 October 2022

Club	Season	League			National Cup		Continental		Other		Total	
Club	Season	Division	Apps	Goals	Apps	Goals	Apps	Goals	Apps	Goals	Apps	Goals
Shakhter Karagandy	2012	Kazakhstan Premier League	0	0	1	1	–		–		1	1
Shakhter Karagandy	2013	Kazakhstan Premier League	16	3	0	0	4	1	0	0	20	4
Shakhter Karagandy	2014	Kazakhstan Premier League	22	2	4	1	4	1	1	0	31	4
Shakhter Karagandy	2015	Kazakhstan Premier League	28	4	1	0	–		–		29	4
Shakhter Karagandy	Total		66	9	6	2	8	2	1	0	81	13
Irtysh Pavlodar	2016	Kazakhstan Premier League	32	18	2	0	–		–		34	18
Astana	2017	Kazakhstan Premier League	32	6	1	0	10	0	1	0	44	6
Astana	2018	Kazakhstan Premier League	28	8	0	0	12	2	0	0	40	10
Astana	2019	Kazakhstan Premier League	32	7	1	0	13	3	1	0	47	10
Astana	Total		92	21	2	0	35	5	2	0	131	26
Tobol	2020	Kazakhstan Premier League	17	2	0	0	–		–		17	2
Astana	2021	Kazakhstan Premier League	18	4	1	0	0	0	2	0	21	4
Baltika Kaliningrad	2021–22	Russian Football National League	11	0	2	1	–		–		13	1
Shakhter Karagandy	2022	Kazakhstan Premier League	22	6	5	4	–		–		27	10
Shakhter Karagandy	2023	Kazakhstan Premier League	20	2	2	0	–		–		22	2
Shakhter Karagandy	Total		42	8	7	4	-	-	-	-	49	12
Career total			260	57	19	5	43	7	5	0	323	69

=== International ===
Kazakhstan national team
Year	Apps	Goals
2016	5	0
2017	5	0
2018	9	3
2019	3	0
2020	0	0
2021	2	0
2022	1	0
Total	25	3

Statistics accurate as of match played 24 March 2022

=== International goals ===
As of match played 16 October 2018
Scores and results list Kazakhstan's goal tally first.

#	Date	Venue	Opponent	Score	Result	Competition
1.	23 March 2018	Groupama Arena, Budapest, Hungary	Hungary	1–0	3–2	Friendly
2.	5 June 2018	Astana Arena, Astana, Kazakhstan	Azerbaijan	1–0	3–0	Friendly
3.	16 October 2018	Astana Arena, Astana, Kazakhstan	Andorra	4–0	4–0	2018–19 UEFA Nations League D
