= Football in Kazakhstan =

- Country: Kazakhstan
- Governing body: Football Federation of Kazakhstan
- National team: men's national team

National competitions
- Kazakhstan Cup

Club competitions
- Kazakhstan Premier League

International competitions
- Champions League; Europa League; Conference League; Super Cup; FIFA Club World Cup; FIFA World Cup (National Team); European Championship (National Team); UEFA Nations League (National Team)

Football in Kazakhstan is governed by the national body the Football Federation of Kazakhstan. The FFK organises the men's, women's and futsal national teams. Football is the most popular sport in the country, followed by ice hockey. Approximately a quarter of the people in Kazakhstan are considered association football fans.

== History ==
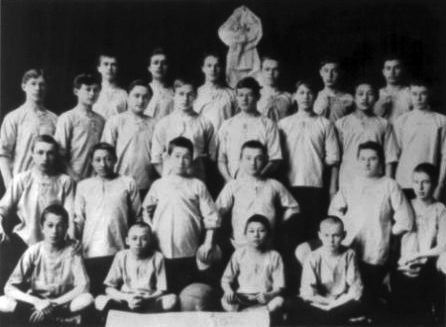
Pioneers of the Kazakh football FC Yarysh of Semipalatinsk, 1914.

Kazakh football first appeared in Semey before World War I, when British merchants brought the game to the area. Among the early players of the game was writer Mukhtar Auezov who turned out for the 'Yarysh' club, the biggest of the time. Teams soon followed in Pavlodar and Dzhambul, before the first official appearance of a Kazakh SSR representative team in 1928. By the 1930s Kazakh club sides were regularly participating in the lower ranks of Soviet football.

After World War II a regular league began in 1946 while a cup competition, previously held sporadically was instituted full-time in 1948. A permanent Kazakh SSR Football Federation was established in 1959. Leading club side FC Kairat Almaty went on to make history in 1960 by becoming the first Kazakh side to compete in the Soviet Top League and made further history in 1963 by reaching the semi-finals of the Soviet Cup, the best performance by a Kazakh team in the competition. They would go on to record Kazakhstan's first triumph in the Soviet First League in 1976.

No Kazakh footballer had represented the USSR until 1977 when FC Kairat defender Seilda Baishakov made his debut in a FIFA World Cup qualifier against Hungary. Later, in 1986, his club would go on to add further to their honours by finishing seventh in the Top League, an all-time best finish for a Kazakh club. The country's Eugeny Yarovenko also added to the honours as a member of the victorious Soviet side at the 1988 Summer Olympics.

After the fall of the Soviet Union, a Football Association of the Republic of Kazakhstan was set up in 1992 and soon accepted into FIFA and the Asian Football Confederation. The national team debuted soon afterwards and individual Kazakh competitions were established. The renamed FFK went on to join UEFA in 2002, ending their relationship with the AFC.

== Domestic competition ==
The main league competition in the country is the Kazakhstan Premier League, formed in 1992 from Zone 8 of the Third Level of Soviet football with other higher placed Kazakh clubs co-opted. A first division was added in 1994 and this competition is now organised on a regional basis and is fed into by a further regionalised second division. The Kazakhstan Cup is also competed for, while successful clubs gain entry to the early rounds of the UEFA Champions League and the UEFA Europa League.

== League system ==
Level	League(s)/division(s)
1	Kazakhstan Premier League; 16 clubs
	↓ 1 club ↑ 2 clubs
2	Kazakhstan First Division; 13 clubs + 3 reserve teams
	↓↑ 2 clubs
3	Kazakhstan Second Division; 9 clubs + 15 reserve teams

== National team ==
Although they participated in matches against other Republics of the Soviet Union, the Kazakhstan team did not make their official debut as an independent country until 1 June 1992, when they defeated Turkmenistan 1–0. Based at the Almaty Central Stadium, they are yet to qualify for a major tournament.

== Champions during Soviet era (1936–91) ==
A Kazakh SSR championship was founded in 1936 with no Kazakh clubs competing in the Soviet Top League. The winners of this competition were:

1936–81

- 1936 – Sbornaya Almaty
- 1937 – Dinamo Almaty
- 1938 – Dinamo Almaty
- 1939–47 – no competition
- 1948 – Dinamo Almaty
- 1949 – Lokomotiv Zhambyl
- 1950 – Sbornaya Almaty
- 1951 – Metallurg Shymkent
- 1952 – Metallurg Shymkent
- 1953 – Metallurg Shymkent
- 1954 – Dinamo Almaty
- 1956 – Sbornaya Almaty
- 1957 – Stroitel Almaty
- 1958 – Spartak Almaty
- 1959 – Spartak Almaty
- 1960 – Yenbek Guryev
- 1961 – Avangard Petropavlovsk
- 1962 – ADK Almaty
- 1963 – Tselinnik Semipalatinsk
- 1964 – ADK Almaty
- 1965 – ADK Almaty
- 1955 – Dinamo Almaty
- 1966 – Aktyubinets Aktyubinsk
- 1967 – Torpedo Kokshetau
- 1968 – Yenbek Zhezkazgan
- 1969 – Shakhtyor Saran'
- 1970 – Stroitel Temirtau
- 1971 – Yenbek Zhezkazgan
- 1972 – Traktor Pavlodar
- 1973 – Yenbek Zhezkazgan
- 1974 – Gornyak Nikol'sky
- 1975 – Metallurg Shymkent
- 1976 – Khimik Stepnogorsk
- 1977 – Khimik Stepnogorsk
- 1978 – Trud Shevchenko
- 1979 – Khimik Stepnogorsk
- 1980 – Meliorator Shymkent
- 1981 – Burevestnik Kostanay

1980–81. Zone 7, 3rd level of Soviet football, including Kazakhstan and other Central Asian teams

- 1980 – Traktor Pavlodar
- 1981 – Aktyubinets Aktobe

1982–91. Zone 8, 3rd level of Soviet football, including only Kazakhstan teams

- 1982 – Shakhter Karagandy
- 1983 – Shakhter Karagandy
- 1984 – Tselinnik Tselinograd
- 1985 – Meliorator Shymkent
- 1986 – Meliorator Shymkent
- 1987 – Meliorator Shymkent
- 1988 – Traktor Pavlodar
- 1989 – Traktor Pavlodar
- 1990 – Vostok Oskemen
- 1991 – Aktyubinets Aktobe

== Most successful clubs overall ==
As of 28 February 2026

local and lower league organizations are not included.

Club	Domestic Titles						
Club	Kazakhstan Premier League	Kazakhstan Cup	USSR Federation Cup	Kazakhstan League Cup	Kazakhstan Super Cup	European Railways Cup	Total
Kairat	5	**10**	**1**	-	3	**1**	**20**
Astana	**7**	3	-	**1**	**6**	-	17
Aktobe	5	2	-	-	3	-	10
Tobol	2	3	-	-	4	-	9
Irtysh Pavlodar	5	1	-	-	-	-	6
Zhenis	3	3	-	-	-	-	6
Spartak Semey	3	1	-	-	-	-	4
Shakhter Karagandy	2	1	-	-	1	-	4
Ordabasy	1	2	-	-	1	-	4
Taraz	1	1	-	-	-	-	2
Kaisar	-	2	-	-	-	-	2
Alma-Ata	-	1	-	-	-	-	1
Atyrau	-	1	-	-	-	-	1
Dostyk	-	1	-	-	-	-	1
Vostok	-	1	-	-	-	-	1

- The articles in italic indicate the defunct leagues and the defunct cups.
- The figures in **bold** indicate the most times this competition has been won by a team.

== Attendances ==
The average attendance per top-flight football league season and the club with the highest average attendance:

Year	League average	Best club	Best club average
2025	5,028	Astana	10,613
2024	4,321	Aktobe	10,442
2023	4,908	Ordabasy	16,602
2022	3,410	Aktobe	9,354
2021	—	—	—
2020	—	—	—
2019	3,739	Aktobe	7,250
2018	3,696	Aktobe	8,835
2017	3,920	Kayrat	9,029
2016	3,899	Kayrat	10,319
2015	3,579	Kayrat	8,675
2014	3,893	Kayrat	7,706
2013	4,182	Aktobe	8,313
2012	4,133	Aktobe	6,877
2011	3,854	Shakhter	6,666
2010	4,137	Aktobe	6,888
2009	3,767	Aktobe	6,823
2008	3,310	Aktobe	6,387
2007	3,956	Aktobe	7,387
2006	3,948	Aktobe	7,733
2005	4,374	Irtysh	7,540
2004	4,741	Irtysh	8,456
2003	5,345	Shakhter	7,938
2002	5,376	Irtysh	9,319
2001	4,241	Kyzylzhar	8,031
2000	3,688	Kyzylzhar	9,121
1999	3,641	Kyzylzhar	7,667
1998	3,023	Ekibastuzets	6,938
1997	3,456	Taraz	6,583

== See also ==
- Sport in Kazakhstan
