= Andrey Paryvayew =

Belarusian footballer

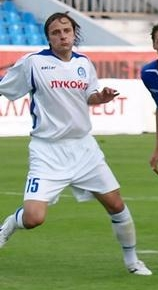

Personal information
- Date of birth: 3 January 1982 (age 44)
- Place of birth: Minsk, Belarusian SSR
- Height: 1.81 m (5 ft 11 1/2 in)
- Position: Midfielder

Youth career
- Smena Minsk

Senior career*
Years	Team	Apps	(Gls)
1999	Molodechno	8	(2)
2000–2002	Dinamo Minsk	15	(3)
2000	→ Dinamo-Juni Minsk	11	(0)
2000	→ Dinamo-2 Minsk	6	(1)
2003–2005	Shakhtyor Soligorsk	15	(0)
2006–2007	SKA-Energiya Khabarovsk	59	(11)
2007	Avangard Kursk	13	(0)
2008	Dinamo Minsk	14	(0)
2008	Vityaz Podolsk	19	(2)
2009	Granit Mikashevichi	22	(1)
2010	Dnepr Mogilev	7	(0)
2010	Gorodeya	14	(1)
2011–2015	Shakhter Karagandy	104	(3)
2016	Isloch Minsk Raion	7	(0)

International career^{‡}
2007	Belarus	1	(0)
- * Club domestic league appearances and goals as of 11 December 2016 ‡ National team caps and goals as of 1 December 2009

Andrey Paryvayew (Belarusian: Андрэй Сяргеевiч Парываеў; Russian: Андрей Сергеевич Порываев; born 3 January 1982) is a former Belarusian professional footballer. His last club was Isloch Minsk Raion.

== Career ==
=== Club ===
Born in Minsk, Paryvayew has played professionally in the Belarusian Premier League, Russian First Division and Kazakhstan Premier League. He has won the Kazakh league twice with FC Shakhter Karagandy.

On 15 July 2016, Paryvayew left Isloch Minsk Raion.

In August 2016, Paryvayew was one of several Isloch Minsk Raion players alleged to be involved in match fixing during their match against Dinamo Brest on 30 April 2016. On 20 February 2018, the BFF banned Paryvayew for life for his involvement in the match fixing between Isloch Minsk Raion and Dinamo Brest in April 2016.

=== International career ===
Paryvayew made one appearance for the Belarus national football team, a friendly against Iran in 2007.

== Career statistics ==
=== Club ===
As of match played 7 July 2016

Appearances and goals by club, season and competition
Club	Season	League			National Cup		League Cup		Continental		Other		Total	
Club	Season	Division	Apps	Goals	Apps	Goals	Apps	Goals	Apps	Goals	Apps	Goals	Apps	Goals
Molodechno	1999	Belarusian Premier League	8	2			-		-		-		8	2
Dinamo-Juni Minsk	2000	Belarusian First League	11	0			-		-		-		11	0
Dinamo Minsk	2000	Belarusian Premier League	1	0			-		0	0	-		1	0
Dinamo Minsk	2001	Belarusian Premier League	2	0			-		-		-		2	0
Dinamo Minsk	2002	Belarusian Premier League	12	3			-		2	0	-		14	3
Dinamo Minsk	Total		15	3			-	-	2	0	-	-	15	3
Shakhtyor Soligorsk	2003	Belarusian Premier League	1	0					-		-		1	0
Shakhtyor Soligorsk	2004	Belarusian Premier League	11	0			-		0	0	-		11	0
Shakhtyor Soligorsk	2005	Belarusian Premier League	3	0			-		-		-		3	0
Shakhtyor Soligorsk	Total		15	0			-	-	0	0	-	-	15	0
SKA-Energiya Khabarovsk	2006	Russian First Division	30	10			-		-		-		30	10
SKA-Energiya Khabarovsk	2007	Russian First Division	21	1			-		-		-		21	1
SKA-Energiya Khabarovsk	Total		51	11			-	-	-	-	-	-	51	11
Avangard Kursk	2007	Russian First Division	13	0			-		-		-		13	0
Vityaz Podolsk	2008	Russian First Division	19	2			-		-		-		19	2
Dinamo Minsk	2008	Belarusian Premier League	14	0			-		-		-		14	0
Granit Mikashevichi	2009	Belarusian Premier League	22	1			-		-		-		22	1
Dnepr Mogilev	2010	Belarusian Premier League	7	0	1	0	-		3	0	-		11	0
Gorodeya	2010	Belarusian Second League	14	1	1	0	-		-		-		15	1
Shakhter Karagandy	2011	Kazakhstan Premier League	11	0	0	0	-		-		-		11	0
Shakhter Karagandy	2012	Kazakhstan Premier League	24	1	5	0	-		2	0	1	0	30	1
Shakhter Karagandy	2013	Kazakhstan Premier League	21	0	5	0	-		10	0	1	1	27	1
Shakhter Karagandy	2014	Kazakhstan Premier League	25	2	3	0	-		2	0	1	0	31	2
Shakhter Karagandy	2015	Kazakhstan Premier League	22	0	1	0	-		-		-		23	0
Shakhter Karagandy	Total		104	3	14	0	-	-	14	0	3	1	135	4
Isloch Minsk Raion	2016	Belarusian Premier League	7	0	0	0	-		-		-		7	0
Career total			300	23	14	0	-	-	16	0	3	1	333	24

== Honours ==
Dinamo Minsk

- Belarusian Cup (1): 2002–03

Shakhtyor Soligorsk

- Belarusian Premier League (1): 2005
- Belarusian Cup (1): 2003–04

Shakhter Karagandy

- Kazakhstan Premier League (2): 2011, 2012
- Kazakhstan Cup (1): 2013
- Kazakhstan Super Cup (1): 2013
