= Kazakhstan Super Cup =

- Organiser(s): Football Federation of Kazakhstan
- Founded: 2008
- Region: Kazakhstan
- Teams: 2 (until 2020, 2022–present); 4 (2021)
- Current champions: Tobol (4 titles)
- Most championships: Astana (6 titles)
- 2026 Kazakhstan Super Cup

The Kazakhstan Super Cup (Kazakh: Қазақстан Суперкубогы, Qazaqstan Superkubogy) is a one-match football annual competition. The two participating clubs are the Kazakhstan Premier League champion and the Kazakhstan Cup winner. If these two competitions are won by the same team, then the other participant will be the runner-up of Kazakhstan Premier League.

The inaugural edition of the trophy was in 2008.

== Finals by year ==
=== Two-team format ===
Season	Winner	Score	Runner-up	Venue	Attendance
2 March 2008	Aktobe; Winner of the 2007 Kazakhstan Premier League	2 – 0	Tobol; Winner of the 2007 Kazakhstan Cup	Central Stadium, Almaty	12,000
2009	Awarded automatically to Aktobe after they won the League and Cup Double				
14 March 2010	Aktobe; Winner of the 2009 Kazakhstan Premier League	2 – 0	Atyrau; Winner of the 2009 Kazakhstan Cup	Astana Arena, Astana	8,000
2 March 2011	Astana; Winner of the 2010 Kazakhstan Cup	2 – 1	Tobol; Winner of the 2010 Kazakhstan Premier League	Astana Arena, Astana	4,100
6 March 2012	Ordabasy; Winner of the 2011 Kazakhstan Cup	1 – 0	Shakhter Karagandy; Winner of the 2011 Kazakhstan Premier League	Astana Arena, Astana	12,000
3 March 2013	Shakhter Karagandy; Winner of the 2012 Kazakhstan Premier League	3 – 2	Astana; Winner of the 2012 Kazakhstan Cup	Astana Arena, Astana	11,200
9 March 2014	Aktobe; Winner of the 2013 Kazakhstan Premier League	1 – 0	Shakhter Karagandy; Winner of the 2013 Kazakhstan Cup	Astana Arena, Astana	14,000
1 March 2015	Astana; Winner of the 2014 Kazakhstan Premier League	0 – 0 (a.e.t.) (3–2 pen.)	Kairat; Winner of the 2014 Kazakhstan Cup	Astana Arena, Astana	14,000
8 March 2016	Kairat; Winner of the 2015 Kazakhstan Cup	0 – 0 (a.e.t.) (5–4 pen.)	Astana; Winner of the 2015 Kazakhstan Premier League	Astana Arena, Astana	14,500
4 March 2017	Kairat; Runners up in the 2016 Kazakhstan Cup	2 – 0	Astana; Winner of the 2016 Kazakhstan Premier League & 2016 Kazakhstan Cup	Central Stadium, Almaty	13,500
4 March 2018	Astana; Winner of the 2017 Kazakhstan Premier League	3 – 0	Kairat; Winner of the 2017 Kazakhstan Cup	Astana Arena, Astana	12,500
3 March 2019	Astana; Winner of the 2018 Kazakhstan Premier League	2 – 0	Kairat; Winner of the 2018 Kazakhstan Cup	Central Stadium, Almaty	16,000
29 February 2020	Astana; Winner of the 2019 Kazakhstan Premier League	1 – 0	Kaisar; Winner of the 2019 Kazakhstan Cup	Tobol Arena, Kostanay	2,900
2 March 2022	Tobol; Winner of the 2021 Kazakhstan Premier League	2 – 1	Kairat; Winner of the 2021 Kazakhstan Cup	Astana Arena, Nur-Sultan	6,000
25 February 2023	Astana; Winner of the 2022 Kazakhstan Premier League	2 – 1	Ordabasy; Winner of the 2022 Kazakhstan Cup	Astana Arena, Astana	7,313
25 February 2024	Tobol; Winner of the 2023 Kazakhstan Premier League	1 – 1 (a.e.t.) (5–4 pen.)	Ordabasy; Winner of the 2023 Kazakhstan Premier League	Mardan Sports Complex, Aksu	6,000
22 February 2025	Kairat; Winner of the 2024 Kazakhstan Premier League	2 – 0	Aktobe Winner of the 2024 Kazakhstan Cup	Astana Arena, Astana	23,975
28 February 2026	Tobol; Winner of the 2025 Kazakhstan Cup	2 – 2 (a.e.t.) (5–4 pen.)	Kairat; Winner of the 2025 Kazakhstan Premier League	Astana Arena, Astana	

=== Four-team format ===
Year	Champions	Score	Runners-up	Semi-finalists	Stadium
2021	Tobol	1 – 1 (5–4 pen.)	Astana	Kairat & Shakhter Karagandy	(Kazakhstan) Turkistan Arena, Turkistan

== Titles by team in Super Cup ==
Team	Winner	Runner-up	Semi-finalist	Years won	Years runner-up	Years semi-finalist
Astana	6	4	-	2011, 2015, 2018, 2019, 2020, 2023	2013, 2016, 2017, 2021	-
Tobol	4	2	–	2021, 2022, 2024, 2026	2008, 2011	-
Aktobe	3	1	–	2008, 2010, 2014	2025	–
Kairat	3	5	1	2016, 2017, 2025	2015, 2018, 2019, 2022, 2026	2021
Shakhter	1	2	1	2013	2012, 2014	2021
Ordabasy	1	2	–	2012	2023, 2024	–
Atyrau	–	1	–	–	2010	–
Kaisar	–	1	–	–	2020	–

== The trophy ==
The material is made out of jasper at Jewellery Plant in Zlatoust. The height is 55 cm.

== All-time top goalscorers ==
As of match played 28 February 2026

Player	Team(s)	Goals	Apps	Ratio
(Russia) Sergei Strukov	Aktobe	3	2	1.5
(Croatia) Marin Tomasov	Astana	3	5	0.6
(Moldova) Igor Bugaiov	Astana	2	1	2
(Democratic Republic of the Congo) Junior Kabananga	Astana	2	2	1
(Kazakhstan) Serhiy Malyi	Tobol	2	5	0.4
(Kazakhstan) Serikzhan Muzhikov	Tobol	2	5	0.4
(Kazakhstan) Evgeniy Averchenko	Aktobe	1	1	1
(Kazakhstan) Aleksandr Kislitsyn	Tobol	1	1	1
(Kazakhstan) Kairat Ashirbekov	Ordabasy	1	1	1
(Kazakhstan) Maksat Baizhanov	Shakhter Karagandy	1	4	0.25
(Belarus) Andrey Paryvayew	Shakhter Karagandy	1	3	0.33
(Kazakhstan) Zhambyl Kukeyev	Shakhter Karagandy	1	2	0.5
(Central African Republic) Foxi Kéthévoama	Astana	1	2	0.5
(Kazakhstan) Sergei Ostapenko	Astana	1	1	1
(Brazil) Danilo Neco	Aktobe	1	1	1
(Spain) César Arzo	Kairat	1	1	1
(Kazakhstan) Islambek Kuat	Kairat	1	4	0.25
(Belarus) Ivan Mayewski	Astana	1	4	0.25
(Cyprus) Pieros Sotiriou	Astana	1	1	1
(Montenegro) Žarko Tomašević	Astana	1	1	1
(Armenia) Tigran Barseghyan	Astana	1	2	0.5
(Kazakhstan) Askhat Tagybergen	Tobol / Ordabasy	2	5	0.4
(Montenegro) Nebojša Kosović	Kairat	1	1	0.33
(Kazakhstan) Artur Shushenachev	Kairat	1	1	0.5
(Kyrgyzstan) Gulzhigit Alykulov	Kairat	1	1	0.33
(Kazakhstan) Jean-Ali Payruz	Shakhter Karagandy	1	2	0.5
(Belarus) Dzyanis Palyakow	Kairat	1	2	0.5
(Germany) Streli Mamba	Kairat	1	2	0.5
(Kazakhstan) Aybar Zhaksylykov	Tobol	1	1	1
(Brazil) João Paulo	Kairat	1	1	1
(North Macedonia) Aleksa Amanović	Tobol / Astana	1	3	0.33
(The Gambia) Dembo Darboe	Astana	1	1	1
(Kazakhstan) Yerkebulan Tungyshbayev	Kairat / Ordabasy	1	3	0.33
(Ukraine) Yevhen Makarenko	Ordabasy	1	1	1
(Serbia) Ivan Miladinović	Tobol	1	1	1
(Brazil) Élder Santana	Kairat	1	1	1
(Belarus) Valery Gromyko	Kairat	1	1	1
(Kazakhstan) Aleksandr Mrynskiy	Kairat	1	1	1
(Finland) Jaakko Oksanen	Kairat	1	1	1
(Venezuela) Luis Guerra	Tobol	1	1	1
