= 2010 FC Shakhter Karagandy season =

Shakhter Karagandy
2010 season
- Manager: Vladimir Cheburin
- Stadium: Shakhter Stadium
- Kazakhstan Premier League: 6th
- Kazakhstan Cup: Runners Up
- UEFA Europa League: First qualifying round vs Ruch Chorzów
- Top goalscorer: League: Two Players (8); All: Andrei Finonchenko (10)
Home colours	Away colours	Third colours

The 2010 FC Shakhter Karagandy season was the clubs nineteenth successive season in the Kazakhstan Premier League, the highest tier of association football in Kazakhstan.

== Squad ==
As of match played 14 November 2010

No.	Name	Nationality	Position	Date of birth (age)	Signed from	Signed in	Apps.	Goals
Goalkeepers
1	Aleksandr Grigorenko	(Kazakhstan)	GK	6 February 1985 (aged 25)	Atyrau	2007		
16	Sergei Sarana	(Ukraine)	GK	7 December 1978 (aged 31)	Atyrau	2005		
30	Igor Shatskiy	(Kazakhstan)	GK	11 May 1989 (aged 21)	Academy	2010	0	0
45	Andrey Pershin	(Kazakhstan)	GK	13 March 1988 (aged 22)	Academy	2010	0	0
Defenders
2	Saša Đorđević	(Serbia)	DF	4 August 1981 (aged 29)	Rad	2008		
4	Aleksey Danaev	(Kazakhstan)	DF	1 September 1979 (aged 31)	Kyzylzhar	2009		
5	Aleksandr Kislitsyn	(Kazakhstan)	DF	8 March 1986 (aged 24)	Academy	2006		
6	Sergei Kozyulin	(Kazakhstan)	DF	9 September 1980 (aged 30)	Ordabasy	2010	12	0
13	Yevgeny Tarasov	(Kazakhstan)	DF	16 April 1985 (aged 25)	Vostok	2009	38	0
18	Igor Mashtakov	(Kazakhstan)	DF	7 July 1987 (aged 23)				
20	Aldin Đidić	(Bosnia and Herzegovina)	DF	30 August 1983 (aged 27)	Baltika Kaliningrad	2010	32	8
22	Yevgeni Goryachi	(Kazakhstan)	DF	2 February 1991 (aged 19)	Bolat	2010	6	0
24	Arman Sahimov	(Kazakhstan)	DF	4 January 1991 (aged 19)	Academy	2010	0	0
25	Yevgeni Azamatov	(Kazakhstan)	DF	21 March 1990 (aged 20)	Academy	2010	0	0
29	Zhandasyl Rymkhan	(Kazakhstan)	DF	21 March 1990 (aged 20)	Academy	2010	0	0
38	Alexander Nuykin	(Kazakhstan)	DF	26 January 1992 (aged 18)	Academy	2010	0	0
39	Alexander Malyshev	(Kazakhstan)	DF	25 February 1992 (aged 18)	Academy	2010	0	0
40	Fedor Rudenko	(Kazakhstan)	DF	28 March 1990 (aged 20)	Academy	2010	0	0
41	Pavel Lunyov	(Kazakhstan)	DF	19 January 1990 (aged 20)	Academy	2010	0	0
46	Anuar Tokenov	(Kazakhstan)	DF	28 May 1991 (aged 19)	Academy	2010	0	0
	Ayan Kusaynov	(Kazakhstan)	DF	10 June 1990 (aged 20)	Academy	2010	0	0
Midfielders
3	Gediminas Vičius	(Lithuania)	MF	5 July 1985 (aged 25)	FBK Kaunas	2010	30	5
7	Askhat Borantayev	(Kazakhstan)	MF	22 August 1978 (aged 32)	Kaisar	2010	17	0
8	Vadim Borovskiy	(Kazakhstan)	MF	30 October 1986 (aged 24)	Atyrau	2010	15	0
9	Sergei Skorykh	(Kazakhstan)	MF	25 May 1984 (aged 26)	Tobol	2010	24	1
12	Igor Pikalkin	(Kazakhstan)	MF	13 March 1988 (aged 22)	Academy	2010	15	1
15	Anatoli Bogdanov	(Russia)	MF	7 June 1981 (aged 29)	Vostok	2009		
17	Alyaksey Suchkow	(Belarus)	MF	10 June 1981 (aged 29)	Neman Grodno	2010	34	3
19	Mikhail Glushko	(Kazakhstan)	MF	3 January 1984 (aged 26)	Kazakhmys	2003		
21	Grigori Dubkov	(Kazakhstan)	MF	22 November 1990 (aged 19)	Academy	2008	26	0
23	Nikita Bildinov	(Kazakhstan)	MF	12 January 1990 (aged 20)	Academy	2010	0	0
26	Zhasulan Kusainov	(Kazakhstan)	MF	23 December 1989 (aged 20)	Academy	2010	0	0
27	Vladimir Moroshan	(Kazakhstan)	MF	5 January 1989 (aged 21)	Academy	2010	0	0
28	Akhat Zholshorin	(Kazakhstan)	MF	28 June 1992 (aged 18)	Academy	2010	0	0
32	Stanislav Vasilyev	(Kazakhstan)	MF	17 November 1992 (aged 17)	Academy	2010	0	0
34	Dmitry Tchaikovsky	(Kazakhstan)	MF	17 June 1992 (aged 18)	Academy	2010	0	0
35	Sergey Kodzhebash	(Kazakhstan)	MF	2 May 1991 (aged 19)	Academy	2010	0	0
36	Yevgeny Krasikov	(Kazakhstan)	MF	6 September 1991 (aged 19)	Academy	2010	0	0
42	Kanat Tyulyubev	(Kazakhstan)	MF	21 July 1991 (aged 19)	Academy	2010	0	0
47	Vladislav Akhmeyev	(Kazakhstan)	MF	19 December 1992 (aged 17)	Academy	2010	2	0
50	Adil Augaliev	(Kazakhstan)	MF	23 January 1990 (aged 20)	Academy	2010	0	0
	Ilnur Mangutkin	(Kazakhstan)	MF	16 September 1986 (aged 24)	Academy	2010	0	0
Forwards
10	Sergei Shaff	(Kazakhstan)	FW	15 April 1988 (aged 22)	Kazakhmys	2008		
11	Jimmy Mulisa	(Rwanda)	FW	24 April 1984 (aged 26)	Ceahlăul Piatra Neamț	2010	17	0
14	Andrei Finonchenko	(Kazakhstan)	FW	21 June 1982 (aged 28)	Academy	2001	261	97
31	Khamid Nurmukhametov	(Kazakhstan)	FW	9 July 1992 (aged 18)	Academy	2010	0	0
33	Margulan Erikov	(Kazakhstan)	FW	2 February 1988 (aged 22)	Academy	2010	0	0
37	Daniyar Zhankin	(Kazakhstan)	FW	28 February 1991 (aged 19)	Academy	2010	0	0
43	Aidos Tattybayev	(Kazakhstan)	FW	26 April 1990 (aged 20)	Gefest	2010	19	4
44	Vitaliy Li	(Kazakhstan)	FW	9 July 1992 (aged 19)	Kazakhmys	2010	0	0
49	Vyacheslav Grachev	(Kazakhstan)	FW	9 October 1989 (aged 21)	Academy	2010	0	0
Players away on loan
Players that left during the season
11	Mladen Hasija	(Croatia)	MF	28 June 1986 (aged 24)	Hrvatski Dragovoljac	2010	4	0
32	Nikita Bildinov	(Kazakhstan)	MF	12 April 1990 (aged 20)	Bolat	2010	13	1

== Transfers ==
=== Winter ===
In: Note: Flags indicate national team as defined under FIFA eligibility rules; some limited exceptions apply. Players may hold more than one non-FIFA nationality.

No.	Pos.	Nation	Player
3	MF	LTU	Gediminas Vičius (from (Lithuania) FBK Kaunas)
7	MF	KAZ	Askhat Borantayev (from (Kazakhstan) Kaisar)
8	MF	KAZ	Vadim Borovskiy (from (Kazakhstan) Atyrau)
9	MF	KAZ	Sergei Skorykh (from (Kazakhstan) Tobol)
11	MF	CRO	Mladen Hasija (from (Croatia) Hrvatski Dragovoljac)
17	MF	BLR	Alyaksey Suchkow (from (Belarus) Neman Grodno)
20	DF	BIH	Aldin Đidić (from (Russia) Baltika Kaliningrad)
22	DF	KAZ	Yevgeni Goryachi (from (Kazakhstan) Bolat)
43	FW	KAZ	Aidos Tattybayev (from (Kazakhstan) Gefest)

Out: Note: Flags indicate national team as defined under FIFA eligibility rules; some limited exceptions apply. Players may hold more than one non-FIFA nationality.

No.	Pos.	Nation	Player
3	DF	KAZ	Igor Soloshenko (to (Kazakhstan) Okzhetpes)
20	MF	NGR	Samson Godwin (loan return to (Ukraine) Karpaty Lviv)
55	FW	SRB	Ivan Perić (to (Kazakhstan) Zhetysu)

=== Summer ===
In: Note: Flags indicate national team as defined under FIFA eligibility rules; some limited exceptions apply. Players may hold more than one non-FIFA nationality.

No.	Pos.	Nation	Player
6	DF	KAZ	Sergei Kozyulin (from (Kazakhstan) Ordabasy)
11	FW	RWA	Jimmy Mulisa (from (Romania) Ceahlăul Piatra Neamț)

Out: Note: Flags indicate national team as defined under FIFA eligibility rules; some limited exceptions apply. Players may hold more than one non-FIFA nationality.

No.	Pos.	Nation	Player
11	MF	CRO	Mladen Hasija

== Competitions ==
=== Kazakhstan Premier League ===
==== First round ====
===== Results =====
28 March 2010 2	Shakhter Karagandy	2 – 0	Aktobe	Temirtau
15:00 (UTC+6)	Suchkow 40'; Finonchenko (yellow card) 54'; Đidić 64'	Report	Tleshev (yellow card) 47'; Dosmagambetov (yellow card) 86'	Stadium: Metallurg Stadium; Attendance: 5,500; Referee: Aydin Rakhimbayev

3 April 2010 3	Tobol	0 – 0	Shakhter Karagandy	Zhetikara
15:00 (UTC+6)	Irismetov (yellow card) 52' (yellow-red card) 55'; Zhumaskaliyev (yellow card) 65'; A.Malishev (yellow card) 73'	Report	Đorđević (yellow card) 70' (yellow-red card) 79'	Stadium: Gornjak Stadion; Attendance: 3,500; Referee: Ruslan Duzmambetov

9 April 2010 4	Shakhter Karagandy	3 – 2	Akzhayik	Temirtau
18:00 (UTC+6)	Finonchenko 30' (yellow card) 66'; Đidić (yellow card) 52'; Suchkow 80'; Bogdanov (yellow card) 88'; Vičius 90'	Report	Sakyi 44' (yellow card) 49'; A.Maltsev 90'	Stadium: Metallurg Stadium; Attendance: 3,500; Referee: Sergey Pasko

15 April 2010 5	Ordabasy	1 – 0	Shakhter Karagandy	Shymkent
17:00 (UTC+6)	Vagner 42'; Kasyanov (yellow card) 51'; Ashirbekov (yellow card) 62'	Report	Suchkow (yellow card) 27'	Stadium: Kazhymukan Munaitpasov Stadium; Attendance: 4,000; Referee: Kairat Slambekov

20 April 2010 6	Shakhter Karagandy	3 – 1	Lokomotiv Astana	Karaganda
19:00 (UTC+6)	Skorykh 28'; Kislitsyn (yellow card) 60'; Vičius 87'; S.Shaff 90'	Report	Khizhnichenko 14'; R.Pakholiuk (yellow card) 67'	Stadium: Shakhter Stadium; Attendance: 12,000; Referee: Akmalkhan Kholmatov

25 April 2010 7	Kairat	0 – 1	Shakhter Karagandy	Almaty
17:00 (UTC+6)	Fomin (yellow card) 31'	Report	N.Bildinov 78'; A.Borantaev (yellow card) 86'	Stadium: Dynamo Stadium; Attendance: 1,000; Referee: Anatolyi Vishnichenko

28 April 2010 1	Zhetysu	0 – 0	Shakhter Karagandy	Taldykorgan
18:00 (UTC+6)	Belić (yellow card) 11'	Report		Stadium: Zhetysu Stadium; Attendance: 3,000; Referee: Viktor Antonov
Note: Match was originally scheduled for 22 March 2010 but postponed due to bad weather.

1 May 2010 8	Shakhter Karagandy	2 – 0	Okzhetpes	Karaganda
17:00 (UTC+6)	Finonchenko 28'; Đorđević (yellow card) 30'; A.Tattybayev 65'	Report	Novikov (yellow card) 60'	Stadium: Shakhter Stadium; Attendance: 7,000; Referee: Pavel Saliy

7 May 2010 9	Irtysh Pavlodar	3 – 1	Shakhter Karagandy	Pavlodar
18:00 (UTC+6)	Daskalov 45', 85'; Akhmetov (yellow card) 54'; V.Goloveshkin 83'; A.Birkurmanov (yellow card) 88'	Report	Vičius 21'	Stadium: Central Stadium; Attendance: 6,000; Referee: Oleg Sokolov

12 May 2010 10	Shakhter Karagandy	2 – 0	Taraz	Karaganda
18:00 (UTC+6)	Finonchenko 21'; Suchkow (yellow card) 27'; Bogdanov (yellow card) 36'; Vičius 56'	Report	Milosavljević (yellow card) 26'; Kurgulin (yellow card) 66'	Stadium: Shakhter Stadium; Attendance: 5,000; Referee: Anatoyli Vishnichenko

20 May 2010 11	Atyrau	1 – 0	Shakhter Karagandy	Atyrau
19:30 (UTC+6)	Aliev (yellow card) 25'; G.Peikrishvili 73' (pen.); V.Sedelnikov (yellow card) 88'	Report	Đidić (yellow card) 36'; Suchkow (yellow card) 41'	Stadium: Munaishy Stadium; Attendance: 7,000; Referee: Gennadiy Zhukovskiy

25 May 2010 12	Aktobe	0 – 1	Shakhter Karagandy	Aktobe
20:00 (UTC+6)		Report	Suchkow 6'	Stadium: Central Stadium; Attendance: 7,000; Referee: Kairat Slambekov

30 May 2010 13	Shakhter Karagandy	1 – 1	Tobol	Karaganda
17:00 (UTC+6)	Đidić 73'	Report	Parkhachev 81'	Stadium: Shakhter Stadium; Attendance: 9,000; Referee: Aleksandr Gauzer

8 June 2010 14	Akzhayik	0 – 3	Shakhter Karagandy	Oral
20:00 (UTC+6)		Report	Đidić 16'; N.Bildinov (yellow card) 23'; Vičius 68'; A.Tattybayev 73'	Stadium: Petr Atoyan Stadium; Attendance: 7,000; Referee: Igor Khisamutdinov

13 June 2010 15	Shakhter Karagandy	0 – 1	Ordabasy	Karaganda
15:00 (UTC+6)	A.Danaev (yellow card) 45'	Report	Mitrofanov 22'; B.Kozhabaev (yellow card) 30'	Stadium: Shakhter Stadium; Attendance: 7,000; Referee: Oleg Sokolov

17 June 2010 16	Lokomotiv Astana	4 – 0	Shakhter Karagandy	Astana
19:00 (UTC+6)	Kirov 37'; O.Spanov 54'; Bugaiov 68'; Gerus (yellow card) 84'; Božinovski 90'	Report	Kislitsyn	Stadium: Astana Arena; Attendance: 4,500; Referee: Viktor Antonov

22 June 2010 17	Shakhter Karagandy	1 – 0	Kairat	Karaganda
19:00 (UTC+6)	Suchkow (yellow card) 45'; Finonchenko 90'	Report	K.Zotov (yellow card) 13'; Sobolev (yellow card) 70'; O.Paviz (yellow card) 90+1'	Stadium: Shakhter Stadium; Attendance: 2,000; Referee: Igor Kister

27 June 2010 18	Okzhetpes	0 – 1	Shakhter Karagandy	Kokshetau
18:00 (UTC+6)	T.Adyrbekov (yellow card) 47'; Glazyukov (yellow card) 61'; Pilipović (yellow card) 75'	Report	Finonchenko (yellow card) 23'; Đidić 55'; Kozyulin (yellow card) 71'	Stadium: Okzhetpes Stadium; Attendance: 2,800; Referee: Ruslan Duzmambetov

18 July 2010 19	Shakhter Karagandy	0 – 1	Irtysh Pavlodar	Karaganda
18:00 (UTC+6)	Suchkow (yellow card) 74'; Bogdanov (yellow card) 77'	Report	Govedarica (yellow card) 36'; Maltsev (yellow card) 44'; Nikolić (yellow card) 74'; K.Zarechniy (yellow card) 74'; Ivanov 76'; Akhmetov (yellow card) 82'	Stadium: Shakhter Stadium; Attendance: 4,000; Referee: Pavel Saliy

25 July 2010 20	Taraz	1 – 5	Shakhter Karagandy	Taraz
19:00 (UTC+6)	D.Yevstigneyev 17'	Report	Finonchenko 25', 49'; Đidić 56', 86'; A.Tattybayev 90+1'	Stadium: Central Stadium; Attendance: 3,200; Referee: Sergey Gorokhovodatskiy

1 August 2010 21	Shakhter Karagandy	1 – 1	Atyrau	Karaganda
18:00 (UTC+6)	Finonchenko 53'; Mulisa (yellow card) 62'; Đorđević (yellow card) 85'	Report	R.Sahalbayev 6' (yellow card) 45'; Zhumabaev (red card) 62'; V.Chureyev (yellow card) 90+3'	Stadium: Shakhter Stadium; Attendance: 5,000; Referee: Sanzhar Iskakov

14 August 2010 22	Shakhter Karagandy	1 – 2	Zhetysu	Karaganda
18:30 (UTC+6)	Đidić 24' (yellow card) 75'; A.Tattybayev (yellow card) 40'	Report	Muzhikov 2', 52'; Parkhachev (yellow card) 39'; S.Stepanenko (yellow card) 85'	Stadium: Shakhter Stadium; Attendance: 4,000; Referee: Bagdat Karlibayev

===== League table =====
Pos	Team	Pld	W	D	L	GF	GA	GD	Pts	Qualification
2	Irtysh Pavlodar	22	12	7	3	30	16	+14	43	Qualification for the championship round
3	Aktobe	22	11	4	7	32	22	+10	37	Qualification for the championship round
4	Shakhter Karagandy	22	11	4	7	28	19	+9	37	Qualification for the championship round
5	Lokomotiv	22	11	3	8	33	21	+12	36	Qualification for the championship round
6	Atyrau	22	11	3	8	29	26	+3	36	Qualification for the championship round

Source: Soccerway
Rules for classification: 1st points; Two team tiebreak: 1st overall wins; 2nd head-to-head record; 3rd goals difference; 4th goals scored; 5th away goals scored; Multiple teams tiebreak: 1st overall wins; 2nd goals difference; 3rd goals scored; 4th away goals scored

==== Championship round ====
===== Results =====
22 August 2010 23	Aktobe	2 – 0	Shakhter Karagandy	Aktobe
20:00 (UTC+6)	Smakov 47' (pen.); Kenzhesariyev 83'	Report	Đidić (yellow card) 55'; Kislitsyn (yellow card) 84'	Stadium: Central Stadium; Attendance: 8,000; Referee: Aydin Rakhimbayev

11 September 2010 24	Atyrau	1 – 1	Shakhter Karagandy	Atyrau
19:00 (UTC+6)	Aliev 37' (pen.) (yellow card) 76'; Frunză (yellow card) 88'	Report	S.Shaff (yellow card) 67'; A.Tattybayev 72' (yellow card) 78'	Stadium: Munaishy Stadium; Attendance: 4,500; Referee: Akmalkhan Kholmatov

17 September 2010 25	Shakhter Karagandy	0 – 1	Lokomotiv Astana	Karaganda
19:00 (UTC+6)	A.Borantaev (yellow card) 17'; Đidić (yellow card) 26' (yellow-red card) 85'	Report	Azovskiy (yellow card) 26'; Kirov 45'; Shakhmetov (yellow card) 79'; O.Spanov (yellow card) 81'	Stadium: Shakhter Stadium; Attendance: 10,000; Referee: Sergey Gorokhovodatskiy

22 September 2010 26	Tobol	1 – 1	Shakhter Karagandy	Kostanay
18:00 (UTC+6)	Lotov 31'; Travin (yellow card) 64'; Abdulin (yellow card) 85'; Petukhov (yellow card) 86'	Report	Y.Tarasov (yellow card) 31'; Mulisa (yellow card) 55'; Finonchenko 88'	Stadium: Central Stadium; Attendance: 7,000; Referee: Sergey Pasko

30 September 2010 27	Shakhter Karagandy	1 – 1	Irtysh Pavlodar	Karaganda
18:00 (UTC+6)	Finonchenko (yellow card) 35'; I.Pikalkin 90' (yellow card) 90'	Report	Shabalin 4'; Govedarica (yellow card) 45'; Ivanov (yellow card) 63'; V.Kryukov (yellow card) 82'	Stadium: Shakhter Stadium; Attendance: 7,000; Referee: Ruslan Duzmambetov

15 October 2010 28	Shakhter Karagandy	0 – 1	Atyrau	Karaganda
18:00 (UTC+6)	Đorđević (yellow card) 20'	Report	V.Sedelnikov (yellow card) 12'; Zhumabaev (yellow card) 26'; A.Shakin 40'; R.Sakhalbaev (yellow card) 43'; Dzholchiyev (yellow card) 52'	Stadium: Shakhter Stadium; Attendance: 2,000; Referee: Kairat Slambekov

22 October 2010 29	Lokomotiv Astana	1 – 1	Shakhter Karagandy	Astana
19:00 (UTC+6)	Bugaiov 2'; Shakhmetov (yellow card) 66'	Report	Đidić (yellow card) 11' (goal) 24'; Y.Tarasov (yellow card) 85'	Stadium: Astana Arena; Attendance: 3,000; Referee: Pavel Saliy

27 October 2010 30	Shakhter Karagandy	0 – 1	Tobol	Karaganda
18:00 (UTC+6)	Y.Tarasov (yellow card) 64'; Bogdanov (yellow card) 68'	Report	Mukanov (yellow card) 30'; Zhumaskaliyev 56'; Yurin (yellow card) 90'	Stadium: Shakhter Stadium; Attendance: 2,000; Referee: Oleg Sokolov

1 November 2010 31	Irtysh Pavlodar	1 – 0	Shakhter Karagandy	Pavlodar
19:00 (UTC+6)	Daskalov 19'; Shomko (yellow card) 85'	Report		Stadium: Central Stadium; Attendance: 3,700; Referee: Akmalkhan Kholmatov

6 November 2010 32	Shakhter Karagandy	0 – 1	Aktobe	Karaganda
18:00 (UTC+6)	Bogdanov (yellow card) 74'	Report	Bono (yellow card) 12'; Khairullin (yellow card) 21' (goal) 89'; Y.Mokrousov (yellow card) 80'; Smakov (yellow card) 82'; Perić (yellow card) 90+2'	Stadium: Shakhter Stadium; Attendance: 1,500; Referee: Viktor Antonov

===== Table =====
Pos	Team	Pld	W	D	L	GF	GA	GD	Pts	Qualification or relegation
4	Lokomotiv	32	14	8	10	41	28	+13	50	
5	Atyrau	32	13	5	14	36	44	−8	44	
6	Shakhter Karagandy	32	11	8	13	32	30	+2	41	Qualification for the Europa League first qualifying round (Note: Because Lokomotiv Astana, the winners of the 2010 Kazakhstan Cup, did not exist for at least three years and could not obtain a UEFA license, the second-placed team of the league, Aktobe, moved up to enter the second qualifying round, and the cup runners-up, Shakhter Karagandy, claimed the vacant Europa League spot in the first qualifying round.)
7	Zhetysu	32	13	10	9	36	26	+10	49	
8	Ordabasy	32	12	9	11	37	34	+3	45	

Source: kff.kz (in Russian)
Rules for classification: 1st points; 2nd overall wins; 3rd goal difference; 4th goals scored.

=== Kazakhstan Cup ===
16 May 2010 Third Round	Gefest	0 – 4	Shakhter Karagandy	Karaganda
(UTC+6)		Report	S.Schaff 23', 42' (pen.); V.Borovskiy 61', 89'; Đidić (yellow card) 90+1'	Attendance: 1,000; Referee: Kyzylbaev

26 September 2010 Quarterfinal	Shakhter Karagandy	2 – 1	Aktobe	Karaganda
(UTC+6)	Suchkow 68'; Đidić (yellow card) 73'; Finonchenko 76'; Grigorenko (yellow card) 81'	Report	Ba (yellow card) 23' (yellow-red card) 89'; Bono (yellow card) 37'; Karpovich (yellow card) 45+'; Khairullin 52'	Stadium: Shakhter Stadium; Attendance: 3,000; Referee: Sokolov

19 October 2010 Semifinal 1st leg	Shakhter Karagandy	0 – 1	Ordabasy	Karaganda
(UTC+6)		Report	(yellow card) 38'; Trajković 62'	Stadium: Shakhter Stadium; Attendance: 1,000; Referee: Antonov

10 November 2010 Semifinal 2nd leg	Ordabasy	1 – 2 (2 – 2 (a) agg.)	Shakhter Karagandy	Shymkent
(UTC+6)	Trajković 12' (pen.); Yevstigneyev (yellow card) 22'; B.Kozhabaev (yellow card) 44'; M.Muminov (yellow card) 75'	Report	Finonchenko 34'; Kislitsyn (yellow card) 57'; F.Rudenko (yellow card) 77'; Bogdanov 88'	Stadium: Kazhymukan Munaitpasov Stadium; Attendance: 2,500; Referee: Zhukovsky

14 November 2010 Final	Lokomotiv Astana	1 – 0	Shakhter Karagandy	Astana
15:00 (UTC+6)	Rozhkov 34' (yellow card) 56'; Andronic (yellow card) 75'	Report	Bogdanov (yellow card) 13'	Stadium: Astana Arena; Attendance: 9,000; Referee: Igor Khisamutdinov

=== UEFA Europa League ===
==== Qualifying rounds ====
1 July 2010 First qualifying round 1st leg	Shakhter Karagandy (Kazakhstan)	1 – 2	(Poland) Ruch Chorzów	Karaganda, Kazakhstan
22:00 (UTC+6)	Đidić 7' (yellow card) 58'; Suchkow (yellow card) 10'; Bogdanov (yellow card) 36'; Sarana (yellow card) 46'	Report	Janoszka 45+1'; Grzyb 48' (pen.); Sobiech (yellow card) 85'	Stadium: Shakhtyor Stadium; Attendance: 10,000; Referee: Gerhard Grobelnik (Austria)

9 July 2010 First qualifying round 2nd leg	Ruch Chorzów (Poland)	1 – 0 (3 – 1 agg.)	(Kazakhstan) Shakhter Karagandy	Chorzów, Poland
01:30 (UTC+6)	Pilarz (yellow card) 40'; Sobiech (yellow card) 55' (goal) 59'; Zając (yellow card) 63'	Report		Stadium: Stadion Miejski; Attendance: 6,000; Referee: Gediminas Mažeika (Lithuania)

== Squad statistics ==
As of match played 14 November 2010

=== Appearances and goals ===
No.	Pos	Nat	Player	Total		Premier League		Kazakhstan Cup		UEFA Europa League	
No.	Pos	Nat	Player	Apps	Goals	Apps	Goals	Apps	Goals	Apps	Goals
1	GK	(Kazakhstan) KAZ	Aleksandr Grigorenko	34	0	30	0	4	0	0	0
2	DF	(Serbia) SRB	Saša Đorđević	33	0	27+1	0	3+1	0	1	0
3	MF	(Lithuania) LTU	Gediminas Vičius	30	5	20+5	5	3	0	2	0
4	DF	(Kazakhstan) KAZ	Aleksey Danaev	22	0	20	0	0	0	2	0
5	DF	(Kazakhstan) KAZ	Aleksandr Kislitsyn	35	0	29	0	4	0	2	0
6	DF	(Kazakhstan) KAZ	Sergei Kozyulin	12	0	4+5	0	2	0	1	0
7	MF	(Kazakhstan) KAZ	Askhat Borantaev	17	0	4+10	0	2	0	1	0
8	MF	(Kazakhstan) KAZ	Vadim Borovskiy	15	0	2+8	0	2+1	0	0+2	0
9	MF	(Kazakhstan) KAZ	Sergei Skorykh	24	1	17+3	1	1+1	0	1+1	0
10	FW	(Kazakhstan) KAZ	Sergei Shaff	15	1	7+3	1	3+2	0	0	0
11	FW	(Rwanda) RWA	Jimmy Mulisa	17	0	8+5	0	3+1	0	0	0
12	MF	(Kazakhstan) KAZ	Igor Pikalkin	15	1	11	1	4	0	0	0
13	DF	(Kazakhstan) KAZ	Yevgeny Tarasov	22	0	14+2	0	4	0	2	0
14	FW	(Kazakhstan) KAZ	Andrei Finonchenko	34	8	25+2	8	4+1	0	2	0
15	MF	(Russia) RUS	Anatoli Bogdanov	35	0	27+2	0	4	0	2	0
16	GK	(Ukraine) UKR	Sergei Sarana	5	0	2	0	1	0	2	0
17	MF	(Belarus) BLR	Alyaksey Suchkow	34	3	26+4	3	2	0	2	0
20	DF	(Bosnia and Herzegovina) BIH	Aldin Đidić	32	8	26+1	8	2+1	0	2	0
21	MF	(Kazakhstan) KAZ	Grigori Dubkov	26	0	19+3	0	0+4	0	0	0
22	DF	(Kazakhstan) KAZ	Yevgeni Goryachi	6	0	5+1	0	0	0	0	0
40	DF	(Kazakhstan) KAZ	Fedor Rudenko	14	0	8+1	0	4+1	0	0	0
43	FW	(Kazakhstan) KAZ	Aidos Tattybayev	19	4	10+8	4	1	0	0	0
47	MF	(Kazakhstan) KAZ	Vladislav Ahmeev	2	0	0+2	0	0	0	0	0
	DF	(Kazakhstan) KAZ	Ayan Kusaynov	1	0	1	0	0	0	0	0
Players away from Shakhter Karagandy on loan:
Players who appeared for Shakhter Karagandy that left during the season:
11	MF	(Croatia) CRO	Mladen Hasija	4	0	0+3	0	1	0	0	0
32	MF	(Kazakhstan) KAZ	Nikita Bildinov	13	1	10+2	1	1	0	0	0

=== Goal scorers ===
Place	Position	Nation	Number	Name	Premier League	Kazakhstan Cup	UEFA Europa League	Total
1	FW	(Kazakhstan)	14	Andrei Finonchenko	8	2	0	10
2	DF	(Bosnia and Herzegovina)	20	Aldin Đidić	8	0	1	9
3	MF	(Lithuania)	3	Gediminas Vičius	5	0	0	5
4	FW	(Kazakhstan)	43	Aidos Tattybayev	4	0	0	4
4	MF	(Belarus)	17	Alyaksey Suchkow	3	1	0	4
6	FW	(Kazakhstan)	10	Sergei Shaff	1	2	0	3
7	FW	(Kazakhstan)	8	Vadim Borovskiy	0	2	0	2
8	MF	(Kazakhstan)	23	Nikita Bildinov	1	0	0	1
8	MF	(Kazakhstan)	12	Igor Pikalkin	1	0	0	1
8	MF	(Kazakhstan)	9	Sergei Skorykh	0	1	0	1
8	MF	(Russia)	15	Anatoli Bogdanov	0	1	0	1
				TOTALS	32	8	1	41

=== Disciplinary record ===
Number	Nation	Position	Name	Premier League		Kazakhstan Cup		UEFA Europa League		Total	
Number	Nation	Position	Name	Yellow card	Red card	Yellow card	Red card	Yellow card	Red card	Yellow card	Red card
1	(Kazakhstan)	GK	Aleksandr Grigorenko	0	0	1	0	0	0	1	0
2	(Serbia)	DF	Saša Đorđević	5	1	0	0	0	0	5	1
4	(Kazakhstan)	DF	Aleksey Danaev	1	0	0	0	0	0	1	0
5	(Kazakhstan)	DF	Aleksandr Kislitsyn	2	0	1	0	0	0	3	0
6	(Kazakhstan)	DF	Sergei Kozyulin	1	0	0	0	0	0	1	0
7	(Kazakhstan)	MF	Askhat Borantaev	2	0	0	0	0	0	2	0
10	(Kazakhstan)	FW	Sergei Shaff	1	0	0	0	0	0	1	0
11	(Rwanda)	FW	Jimmy Mulisa	2	0	0	0	0	0	2	0
12	(Kazakhstan)	DF	Igor Pikalkin	1	0	0	0	0	0	1	0
13	(Kazakhstan)	DF	Yevgeny Tarasov	3	0	0	0	0	0	3	0
14	(Kazakhstan)	FW	Andrei Finonchenko	4	0	0	0	0	0	4	0
15	(Russia)	MF	Anatoli Bogdanov	5	0	1	0	1	0	7	0
16	(Ukraine)	GK	Sergei Sarana	0	0	0	0	1	0	1	0
17	(Belarus)	MF	Alyaksey Suchkow	5	0	0	0	1	0	6	0
20	(Bosnia and Herzegovina)	DF	Aldin Đidić	6	1	2	0	1	0	9	1
32	(Kazakhstan)	FW	Nikita Bildinov	1	0	0	0	0	0	1	0
40	(Kazakhstan)	MF	Fedor Rudenko	0	0	1	0	0	0	1	0
43	(Kazakhstan)	FW	Aidos Tattybayev	2	0	0	0	0	0	2	0
			TOTALS	41	2	6	0	4	0	51	2
