= FC Shakhter Karagandy in European football =

Overview of FC Ararat-Armenia's role in European football

Shakhter Karagandy in European football
- Club: Shakhter Karagandy
- Seasons played: 8
- Most appearances: Aldin Đidić (26)
- Top scorer: Andrei Finonchenko (5)
- First entry: 2006 UEFA Intertoto Cup
- Latest entry: 2021–22 UEFA Europa Conference League

FC Shakhter Karagandy is a Kazakh football club based in Karaganda. Shakhter first qualified for European football at the end of the 2005 season, where they finished in 5th position and were Kazakhstan's representative in the 2006 UEFA Intertoto Cup.

== History ==
=== 2000's ===
On 10 April 2006, UEFA announced the draw for the 2006 UEFA Intertoto Cup, drawing Shakhter in to the Central/East 1st Round draw where they would play the Belarusian entrant, MTZ-RIPO Minsk.

=== 2010's ===
During their 2013 season, Shakhter entered the UEFA Champions League at the Second qualifying round stage after winning the League the previous season. After defeating BATE Borisov and then Skënderbeu Korçë, Shakhter were drawing against Celtic. Shakhter won the first leg, played at the Astana Arena, 2-0 thanks to goals from Andrei Finonchenko and Sergey Khizhnichenko. Following the game, Shakhter were warned by UEFA after they had sacrificed a sheep at the stadium before the game against Celtic. Celtic then went on to win the second leg of the tie 3–0 at Celtic Park to progress to the group stages of the Champions League, whilst Shakhter dropped down in to the group stage of the UEFA Europa League were they would finish bottom on two points.

=== Matches ===
As of match played 26 August 2021

Season	Competition	Round	Club	Home	Away	Aggregate
2006	UEFA Intertoto Cup	1R	(Belarus) MTZ-RIPO Minsk	1–5	3–1	4–6
2008–09	UEFA Cup	1Q	(Hungary) Debrecen	1–1	0–1	1–2
2010–11	UEFA Europa League	1Q	(Poland) Ruch Chorzów	1–2	0–1	1–3
2011–12	UEFA Europa League	1Q	(Slovenia) Koper	2–1	1–1	3–2
2011–12	UEFA Europa League	2Q	(Republic of Ireland) St Patrick's Athletic	2–1	0–2	2–3
2012–13	UEFA Champions League	2Q	(Czech Republic) Slovan Liberec	1–1 (a.e.t.)	0–1	1–2
2013–14	UEFA Champions League	2Q	(Belarus) BATE Borisov	1–0	1–0	2–0
2013–14	UEFA Champions League	3Q	(Albania) Skënderbeu	3–0	2–3	5–3
2013–14	UEFA Champions League	PO	(Scotland) Celtic	2–0	0–3	2–3
2013–14	UEFA Europa League	Group L	(Netherlands) AZ Alkmaar	1–1	0–1	4th place
2013–14	UEFA Europa League	Group L	(Greece) PAOK	0–2	1–2	4th place
2013–14	UEFA Europa League	Group L	(Israel) Maccabi Haifa	2–2	1–2	4th place
2014–15	UEFA Europa League	1Q	(Armenia) Shirak	4–0	2–1	6–1
2014–15	UEFA Europa League	2Q	(Lithuania) Atlantas	3–0	0–0	3–0
2014–15	UEFA Europa League	3Q	(Croatia) Hajduk Split	4–2	0–3	4–5
2021–22	UEFA Europa Conference League	2Q	(Romania) FCSB	2–1 (a.e.t.)	0–1	2–2 (5–3 p)
2021–22	UEFA Europa Conference League	3Q	(Ukraine) Kolos Kovalivka	0–0 (a.e.t.)	0–0	0–0 (3–1 p)
2021–22	UEFA Europa Conference League	PO	(Israel) Maccabi Tel Aviv	1–2	0–2	1–4

== Player statistics ==
=== Appearances ===
As of match played 26 August 2021

	Name	Years	UEFA Intertoto Cup	UEFA Cup	UEFA Champions League	UEFA Europa League	UEFA Europa Conference League	Total	Ratio
1	(Bosnia and Herzegovina) Aldin Đidić	2010-2016	(-)	(-)	8 (1)	18 (2)	(-)	26 (3)	0.12
2	(Kazakhstan) Andrei Finonchenko	2001-2016	2 (0)	(-)	8 (1)	15 (4)	(-)	25 (5)	0.2
2	(Lithuania) Gediminas Vičius	2010-2014	(-)	(-)	8 (0)	17 (0)	(-)	25 (0)	0
4	(Kazakhstan) Aleksandr Mokin	2011-2015	(-)	(-)	8 (0)	14 (0)	(-)	22 (0)	0
5	(Kazakhstan) Maksat Bayzhanov	2011-2014, 2016	(-)	(-)	5 (1)	14 (0)	(-)	19 (1)	0.05
6	(Kazakhstan) Serhiy Malyi	2013-2014, 2009-2019	(-)	(-)	5 (0)	12 (1)	(-)	17 (1)	0.06
6	(Serbia) Aleksandar Simčević	2013-2014	(-)	(-)	6 (0)	11 (0)	(-)	17 (0)	0
8	(Kazakhstan) Sergey Khizhnichenko	2011-2013, 2017	(-)	(-)	6 (4)	9 (0)	(-)	15 (4)	0.27
9	(Bosnia and Herzegovina) Nikola Vasiljević	2011-2015, 2016-2017	(-)	(-)	8 (0)	6 (2)	(-)	14 (2)	0.14
9	(Belarus) Andrey Paryvayew	2011-2015	(-)	(-)	8 (0)	6 (0)	(-)	14 (0)	0
9	(Colombia) Roger Cañas	2012-2013, 2022–Present	(-)	(-)	8 (0)	6 (2)	(-)	14 (2)	0.14
12	(Kazakhstan) Yevgeni Tarasov	2002-2004, 2009-2019	(-)	(-)	4 (0)	8 (1)	(-)	12 (1)	0.08
13	(Kazakhstan) Aleksandr Kirov	2011-2012, 2014	(-)	(-)	2 (0)	9 (0)	(-)	11 (0)	0
13	(Belarus) Igor Zenkovich	2013	(-)	(-)	6 (1)	5 (0)	(-)	11 (1)	0.09
13	(Armenia) Gevorg Ghazaryan	2013	(-)	(-)	5 (0)	6 (0)	(-)	11 (0)	0
16	(Kazakhstan) Ulan Konysbayev	2011, 2013-2014	(-)	(-)	(-)	10 (4)	(-)	10 (4)	0.4
17	(Kazakhstan) Roman Murtazayev	2012-2015, 2022-2023	(-)	(-)	2 (1)	6 (1)	(-)	8 (2)	0.25
18	(Kazakhstan) Zhambyl Kukeyev	2011-2013	(-)	(-)	2 (1)	4 (1)	(-)	6 (2)	0.33
18	(Kazakhstan) Mikhail Gabyshev	2012-2018, 2021-2022	(-)	(-)	2 (0)	0 (0)	4 (1)	6 (1)	0.17
18	(Slovakia) Ján Maslo	2014	(-)	(-)	(-)	6 (0)	(-)	6 (0)	0
18	(Croatia) Nikola Pokrivač	2014-2015	(-)	(-)	(-)	6 (1)	(-)	6 (1)	0.17
18	(Austria) Mihret Topčagić	2014-2016	(-)	(-)	(-)	6 (3)	(-)	6 (3)	0.5
18	(Kazakhstan) Igor Shatsky	2008-2011, 2015–2019, 2021-2023	(-)	0 (0)	(-)	0 (0)	6 (0)	6 (0)	0
18	(Russia) Andrey Buyvolov	2020-2021	(-)	(-)	(-)	(-)	6 (0)	6 (0)	0
18	(Croatia) Ivan Graf	2021-2022	(-)	(-)	(-)	(-)	6 (0)	6 (0)	0
18	(Ghana) David Mawutor	2021	(-)	(-)	(-)	(-)	6 (0)	6 (0)	0
18	(Belarus) Yevgeny Shikavka	2021	(-)	(-)	(-)	(-)	6 (0)	6 (0)	0
18	(Kazakhstan) Eskendir Kybyray	2021, 2024–Present	(-)	(-)	(-)	(-)	6 (0)	6 (0)	0
18	(Bosnia and Herzegovina) Edin Rustemović	2021-2022	(-)	(-)	(-)	(-)	6 (0)	6 (0)	0
30	(Uzbekistan) Kamoliddin Murzoev	2014	(-)	(-)	(-)	5 (0)	(-)	5 (0)	0
30	(Serbia) Vuk Mitošević	2021	(-)	(-)	(-)	(-)	5 (0)	5 (0)	0
30	(Kazakhstan) Oralkhan Omirtayev	2015-2019, 2021	(-)	(-)	(-)	0 (0)	5 (0)	5 (0)	0
30	(Kazakhstan) Aydos Tattybayev	2010-2011, 2016–2018, 2020-Present	(-)	(-)	(-)	(-)	5 (1)	5 (1)	0.2
30	(Serbia) Stefan Bukorac	2021, 2022-2023	(-)	(-)	(-)	(-)	5 (0)	5 (0)	0
35	(Ukraine) Sergei Sarana	2005-2010	2 (0)	0 (0)	(-)	2 (0)	(-)	4 (0)	0
35	(Kazakhstan) Oleg Kornienko	2001-2008	2 (0)	2 (0)	(-)	(-)	(-)	4 (0)	0
35	(Kazakhstan) Mikhail Glushko	2003-2011	2 (1)	2 (0)	(-)	(-)	(-)	4 (1)	0.25
35	(Moldova) Veaceslav Rusnac	2004-2008	2 (1)	2 (0)	(-)	(-)	(-)	4 (1)	0.25
35	(Kazakhstan) Aleksandr Kislitsyn	2006-2010, 2020	(-)	2 (0)	(-)	2 (0)	(-)	4 (0)	0
35	(Kazakhstan) Askhat Borantaev	2010-2014	(-)	(-)	(-)	4 (0)	(-)	4 (0)	0
35	(Kazakhstan) Vadim Borovskiy	2010-2013	(-)	(-)	(-)	4 (0)	(-)	4 (0)	0
35	(Kazakhstan) Kairat Utabayev	2011	(-)	(-)	(-)	4 (0)	(-)	4 (0)	0
35	(Kazakhstan) Serik Dosmanbetov	2011-2012	(-)	(-)	(-)	4 (0)	(-)	4 (0)	0
35	(Russia) Vladimir Khozin	2021-2022	(-)	(-)	(-)	(-)	4 (0)	4 (0)	0
35	(North Macedonia) David Atanaskoski	2021-2022	(-)	(-)	(-)	(-)	4 (0)	4 (0)	0
35	(Kazakhstan) Gevorg Najaryan	2015, 2017, 2018-2021	(-)	(-)	(-)	(-)	4 (0)	4 (0)	0
35	(France) Abdel Lamanje	2021-2022	(-)	(-)	(-)	(-)	4 (0)	4 (0)	0
48	(Kazakhstan) Ruslan Kenetaev	2006-2010	1 (0)	2 (0)	(-)	(-)	(-)	3 (0)	0
48	(Serbia) Saša Đorđević	2008-2010	(-)	2 (0)	(-)	1 (0)	(-)	3 (0)	0
48	(Kazakhstan) Aslan Darabayev	2008-2009, 2013	(-)	(-)	1 (0)	2 (0)	(-)	3 (0)	0
48	(Kazakhstan) Abylaykhan Nazymkhanov	2021–Present	(-)	(-)	(-)	(-)	3 (0)	3 (0)	0
48	(Belarus) Pavel Nazarenko	2021-2022	(-)	(-)	(-)	(-)	3 (0)	3 (0)	0
48	(Russia) Idris Umayev	2021	(-)	(-)	(-)	(-)	3 (1)	3 (1)	0.33
54	(Serbia) Željko Joksimović	2005-2006	2 (0)	(-)	(-)	(-)	(-)	2 (0)	0
54	(Kazakhstan) Ilnur Mangutkin	2006-2009, 2011, 2017-2019	2 (0)	(-)	(-)	(-)	(-)	2 (0)	0
54	(Serbia) Vladica Ćurčić	2005-2006	2 (0)	(-)	(-)	(-)	(-)	2 (0)	0
54	(Kazakhstan) Evgeniy Lunev	1996, 1998, 2000–2003, 2005–2006, 2009	2 (0)	(-)	(-)	(-)	(-)	2 (0)	0
54	(Brazil) Nilton Mendes	2004, 2006	2 (1)	(-)	(-)	(-)	(-)	2 (1)	0.5
54	(Kazakhstan) Rafael Urazbakhtin	2006	2 (1)	(-)	(-)	(-)	(-)	2 (1)	0.5
54	(Kazakhstan) Rakhman Asukhanov	2005-2006	2 (0)	(-)	(-)	(-)	(-)	2 (0)	0
54	(Kazakhstan) David Loriya	2004-2008	0 (0)	2 (0)	(-)	(-)	(-)	2 (0)	0
54	(Kazakhstan) Maksim Samchenko	2001-2003, 2007-2008	(-)	2 (0)	(-)	(-)	(-)	2 (0)	0
54	(Kazakhstan) Yevgeny Lovchev	2007-2008	(-)	2 (0)	(-)	(-)	(-)	2 (0)	0
54	(Kazakhstan) Kairat Ashirbekov	2008	(-)	2 (0)	(-)	(-)	(-)	2 (0)	0
54	(Czech Republic) Milan Pacanda	2008-2009	(-)	2 (0)	(-)	(-)	(-)	2 (0)	0
54	(Serbia) Ivan Perić	2005-2006, 2008-2009	(-)	2 (1)	(-)	(-)	(-)	2 (1)	0.5
54	(Kazakhstan) Aleksey Danaev	2009-2010	(-)	(-)	(-)	2 (0)	(-)	2 (0)	0
54	(Kazakhstan) Anatoly Bogdanov	2009-2010	(-)	(-)	(-)	2 (0)	(-)	2 (0)	0
54	(Belarus) Alyaksey Suchkow	2010	(-)	(-)	(-)	2 (0)	(-)	2 (0)	0
54	(Kazakhstan) Sergei Skorykh	2010, 2015–2017, 2019	(-)	(-)	(-)	2 (0)	(-)	2 (0)	0
54	(Serbia) Milanko Rašković	2011	(-)	(-)	(-)	2 (0)	(-)	2 (0)	0
54	(Serbia) Dušan Petronijević	2011	(-)	(-)	(-)	2 (0)	(-)	2 (0)	0
54	(Serbia) Filip Arsenijević	2012	(-)	(-)	2 (0)	(-)	(-)	2 (0)	0
54	(Kazakhstan) Sergey Gridin	2012	(-)	(-)	2 (0)	(-)	(-)	2 (0)	0
54	(Latvia) Eduards Višņakovs	2012-2013	(-)	(-)	2 (0)	(-)	(-)	2 (0)	0
54	(Kazakhstan) Stas Pokatilov	2013-2014	(-)	(-)	0 (0)	2 (0)	(-)	2 (0)	0
54	(Kazakhstan) Stanislav Lunin	2012-2014, 2019	(-)	(-)	0 (0)	2 (0)	(-)	2 (0)	0
54	(Uzbekistan) Shavkat Salomov	2014	(-)	(-)	0 (0)	2 (0)	(-)	2 (0)	0
54	(Kazakhstan) Toktar Zhangylyshbay	2011-2015, 2022-2023	(-)	(-)	(-)	2 (1)	(-)	2 (1)	0.5
54	(Russia) Mikhail Bakayev	2020-2021	(-)	(-)	(-)	(-)	2 (0)	2 (0)	0
54	(Bulgaria) Martin Toshev	2012	(-)	(-)	(-)	(-)	2 (0)	2 (0)	0
82	(Kazakhstan) Vladimir Kashtanov	2003-2006	1 (0)	(-)	(-)	(-)	(-)	1 (0)	0
82	(Georgia (country)) Lasha Nozadze	2007-2008	(-)	1 (0)	(-)	(-)	(-)	1 (0)	0
82	(Kazakhstan) Murat Suyumagambetov	2008	(-)	1 (0)	(-)	(-)	(-)	1 (0)	0
82	(Kazakhstan) Viktor Kozhushko	2008	(-)	1 (0)	(-)	(-)	(-)	1 (0)	0
82	(Kazakhstan) Sergei Kozyulin	2007-2008	(-)	(-)	(-)	1 (0)	(-)	1 (0)	0
82	(Kazakhstan) Ivan Sviridov	2020-2023	(-)	(-)	(-)	(-)	1 (0)	1 (0)	0
82	(Kazakhstan) Tair Nurseitov	2021	(-)	(-)	(-)	(-)	1 (0)	1 (0)	0

=== Goalscorers ===
As of match played 26 August 2021

	Name	Years	UEFA Intertoto Cup	UEFA Cup	UEFA Champions League	UEFA Europa League	UEFA Europa Conference League	Total	Ratio
1	(Kazakhstan) Andrei Finonchenko	2001-2016	0 (2)	(-)	1 (8)	4 (15)	(-)	5 (25)	0.2
2	(Kazakhstan) Sergey Khizhnichenko	2011-2013, 2017	(-)	(-)	4 (6)	0 (9)	(-)	4 (15)	0.27
2	(Kazakhstan) Ulan Konysbayev	2011, 2013-2014	(-)	(-)	(-)	4 (10)	(-)	4 (10)	0.4
4	(Austria) Mihret Topčagić	2014-2016	(-)	(-)	(-)	3 (6)	(-)	3 (6)	0.5
4	(Bosnia and Herzegovina) Aldin Đidić	2010-2016	(-)	(-)	1 (8)	2 (18)	(-)	3 (26)	0.12
6	(Bosnia and Herzegovina) Nikola Vasiljević	2011-2015, 2016-2017	(-)	(-)	0 (8)	2 (6)	(-)	2 (14)	0.14
6	(Kazakhstan) Zhambyl Kukeyev	2011-2013	(-)	(-)	1 (2)	1 (4)	(-)	2 (6)	0.33
6	(Colombia) Roger Cañas	2012-2013, 2022–Present	(-)	(-)	0 (8)	2 (6)	(-)	2 (14)	0.14
6	(Kazakhstan) Roman Murtazayev	2012-2015, 2022-2023	(-)	(-)	1 (2)	1 (6)	(-)	2 (8)	0.25
10	(Brazil) Nilton Mendes	2004, 2006	1 (2)	(-)	(-)	(-)	(-)	1 (2)	0.5
10	(Moldova) Veaceslav Rusnac	2004-2008	1 (2)	0 (2)	(-)	(-)	(-)	1 (4)	0.25
10	(Kazakhstan) Rafael Urazbakhtin	2006	1 (2)	(-)	(-)	(-)	(-)	1 (2)	0.5
10	(Kazakhstan) Mikhail Glushko	2003-2011	1 (2)	0 (2)	(-)	(-)	(-)	1 (4)	0.25
10	(Serbia) Ivan Perić	2005-2006, 2008-2009	(-)	1 (2)	(-)	(-)	(-)	1 (2)	0.5
10	(Belarus) Igor Zenkovich	2013	(-)	(-)	1 (6)	0 (5)	(-)	1 (11)	0.09
10	(Kazakhstan) Maksat Bayzhanov	2011-2014, 2016	(-)	(-)	1 (5)	0 (14)	(-)	1 (19)	0.05
10	(Kazakhstan) Yevgeni Tarasov	2002-2004, 2009-2019	(-)	(-)	0 (4)	1 (8)	(-)	1 (12)	0.08
10	(Kazakhstan) Serhiy Malyi	2013-2014, 2009-2019	(-)	(-)	0 (5)	1 (12)	(-)	1 (17)	0.06
10	(Croatia) Nikola Pokrivač	2014-2015	(-)	(-)	(-)	1 (6)	(-)	1 (6)	0.17
10	(Kazakhstan) Toktar Zhangylyshbay	2011-2015, 2022-2023	(-)	(-)	(-)	1 (2)	(-)	1 (2)	0.5
10	(Kazakhstan) Mikhail Gabyshev	2012-2018, 2021-2022	(-)	(-)	0 (2)	0 (0)	1 (4)	1 (6)	0.17
10	(Kazakhstan) Aydos Tattybayev	2010-2011, 2016–2018, 2020-Present	(-)	(-)	(-)	(-)	1 (5)	1 (5)	0.2
10	(Russia) Idris Umayev	2021	(-)	(-)	(-)	(-)	1 (3)	1 (3)	0.33
10	Own Goal	2006–Present	0 (2)	0 (2)	0 (8)	1 (18)	0 (6)	1 (36)	0.03

=== Clean sheets ===
As of match played 26 August 2021

	Name	Years	UEFA Intertoto Cup	UEFA Cup	UEFA Champions League	UEFA Europa League	UEFA Europa Conference League	Total	Ratio
1	(Kazakhstan) Aleksandr Mokin	2011-2015	(-)	(-)	4 (8)	3 (14)	(-)	7 (22)	0.32
2	(Kazakhstan) Igor Shatsky	2008-2011, 2015–2019, 2021-2023	(-)	0 (0)	(-)	0 (0)	2 (6)	2 (6)	0.33
3	(Ukraine) Sergei Sarana	2005-2010	0 (2)	0 (0)	(-)	0 (2)	(-)	0 (4)	0
3	(Kazakhstan) David Loriya	2004-2008	0 (0)	0 (2)	(-)	(-)	(-)	0 (2)	0
3	(Kazakhstan) Stas Pokatilov	2013-2014	(-)	(-)	0 (0)	0 (2)	(-)	0 (2)	0

== Overall record ==
=== By competition ===
As of match played 26 August 2021

Competition	GP	W	D	L	GF	GA	+/-
UEFA Intertoto Cup	2	1	0	1	4	6	-2
UEFA Cup	2	0	1	1	1	2	-1
UEFA Champions League	8	4	1	3	10	8	+2
UEFA Europa League	18	6	4	8	24	24	0
UEFA Conference League	6	1	2	3	3	5	-2
Total	36	12	8	16	42	45	-3

=== By country ===
As of match played 26 August 2021

Country	Pld	W	D	L	GF	GA	GD	Win%
Albania	2	1	0	1	5	3	+2	50.00
Armenia	2	2	0	0	6	1	+5	100.00
Belarus	4	3	0	1	6	6	+0	75.00
Croatia	2	1	0	1	4	5	−1	50.00
Czech Republic	2	0	1	1	1	2	−1	0.00
Greece	2	0	0	2	1	4	−3	0.00
Hungary	2	0	1	1	1	2	−1	0.00
Israel	4	0	1	3	4	8	−4	0.00
Lithuania	2	1	1	0	3	0	+3	50.00
Netherlands	2	0	1	1	1	2	−1	0.00
Poland	2	0	0	2	1	3	−2	0.00
Republic of Ireland	2	1	0	1	2	3	−1	50.00
Romania	2	1	0	1	2	2	+0	50.00
Scotland	2	1	0	1	2	3	−1	50.00
Slovenia	2	1	1	0	3	2	+1	50.00
Ukraine	2	0	2	0	0	0	+0	0.00

=== By club ===
As of match played 26 August 2021

Opponent	Pld	W	D	L	GF	GA	GD	Win%
(Albania) Skënderbeu Korçë	2	1	0	1	5	3	+2	50.00
(Armenia) Shirak	2	2	0	0	6	1	+5	100.00
(Belarus) BATE Borisov	2	2	0	0	2	0	+2	100.00
(Belarus) MTZ-RIPO Minsk	2	1	0	1	4	6	−2	50.00
(Croatia) Hajduk Split	2	1	0	1	4	5	−1	50.00
(Czech Republic) Slovan Liberec	2	0	1	1	1	2	−1	0.00
(Greece) PAOK	2	0	0	2	1	4	−3	0.00
(Hungary) Debrecen	2	0	1	1	1	2	−1	0.00
(Israel) Maccabi Haifa	2	0	1	1	3	4	−1	0.00
(Israel) Maccabi Tel Aviv	2	0	0	2	1	4	−3	0.00
(Lithuania) Atlantas	2	1	1	0	3	0	+3	50.00
(Netherlands) AZ Alkmaar	2	0	1	1	1	2	−1	0.00
(Poland) Ruch Chorzów	2	0	0	2	1	3	−2	0.00
(Republic of Ireland) St Patrick's Athletic	2	1	0	1	2	3	−1	50.00
(Romania) FCSB	2	1	0	1	2	2	+0	50.00
(Scotland) Celtic	2	1	0	1	2	3	−1	50.00
(Slovenia) Koper	2	1	1	0	3	2	+1	50.00
(Ukraine) Kolos Kovalivka	2	0	2	0	0	0	+0	0.00
