= 2016 FC Shakhter Karagandy season =

FC Shakhter Karagandy
2016 season
- Chairman: Yerden Khalilin
- Manager: Jozef Vukušič (until 3 August); Aleksei Yeryomenko (from 4 August)
- Stadium: Shakhter Stadium
- Kazakhstan Premier League: 9th
- Kazakhstan Cup: Last 16 vs Kairat
- Top goalscorer: League: Desley Ubbink (6); All: Desley Ubbink (6)
| Home colours | Away colours | Third colours |

The 2016 FC Shakhter Karagandy season is the 25th successive season that the club will play in the Kazakhstan Premier League, the highest tier of association football in Kazakhstan. Shakhter Karagandy will also be participating in the Kazakhstan Cup.

On 3 August, Jozef Vukušič resigned as manager, with Aleksei Yeryomenko being appointed his successor the following day.

== Squad ==
As of 11 July 2016

Note: Flags indicate national team as defined under FIFA eligibility rules; some limited exceptions apply. Players may hold more than one non-FIFA nationality.

| No. | Pos. | Nation | Player |
|---|---|---|---|
| 1 | GK | KAZ | Yaroslav Baginskiy |
| 3 | DF | BIH | Nikola Vasiljević |
| 4 | DF | KAZ | Mikhail Gabyshev |
| 5 | DF | ARM | Robert Arzumanyan (loan from Amkar Perm) |
| 7 | MF | NED | Desley Ubbink |
| 9 | FW | KAZ | Aidos Tattybayev |
| 11 | MF | KAZ | Maksat Baizhanov |
| 14 | FW | KAZ | Andrei Finonchenko |
| 15 | DF | KAZ | Gregory Dubkov |
| 16 | FW | KAZ | Sergey Vetrov |
| 17 | MF | KAZ | Aibar Nurybekov |
| 18 | MF | SVK | Štefan Zošák |
| 19 | DF | KAZ | Yevgeny Tarasov |

| No. | Pos. | Nation | Player |
|---|---|---|---|
| 20 | DF | BLR | Ivan Sadownichy |
| 22 | MF | KAZ | Sergei Skorykh |
| 24 | FW | MKD | Marko Simonovski |
| 25 | GK | KAZ | Serhiy Tkachuk |
| 27 | MF | SVK | Július Szöke |
| 30 | GK | KAZ | Igor Shatskiy |
| 34 | DF | KAZ | Igor Pikalkin |
| 44 | MF | KAZ | Kuanysh Ermekov |
| 77 | DF | KAZ | Yevgeni Goryachi |
| 88 | MF | KAZ | Vladislav Vasiliev |
| 89 | FW | SVK | Filip Serečin |
| 98 | FW | KAZ | Oralkhan Omirtayev |

=== Reserve team ===
Note: Flags indicate national team as defined under FIFA eligibility rules; some limited exceptions apply. Players may hold more than one non-FIFA nationality.

| No. | Pos. | Nation | Player |
|---|---|---|---|
| 12 | GK | KAZ | Marlene Imagambetov |
| 15 | MF | KAZ | Akhat Zholshorin |
| 24 | DF | KAZ | Arman Sakhimov |
| 27 | MF | KAZ | Nursultan Zhusupov |
| 28 | DF | KAZ | Marat Rakishev |
| 29 | FW | KAZ | Khamid Nurmukhametov |
| 33 | DF | KAZ | Vladlen Antoshhuk |

| No. | Pos. | Nation | Player |
|---|---|---|---|
| 37 | DF | KAZ | Aleksandr Zemtsov |
| 38 | DF | KAZ | Aleksandr Nuikin |
| 39 | DF | KAZ | Aleksandr Matyshev |
| 40 | MF | KAZ | Anton Olenich |
| 43 | DF | KAZ | Dmitry Moiseev |
| 44 | MF | KAZ | Kuanysh Ermekov |
| 47 | MF | KAZ | Aslanbek Arshkenov |

== Transfers ==
=== Winter ===
In: Note: Flags indicate national team as defined under FIFA eligibility rules; some limited exceptions apply. Players may hold more than one non-FIFA nationality.

| No. | Pos. | Nation | Player |
|---|---|---|---|
| 1 | MF | KAZ | Yaroslav Baginskiy (from (Kazakhstan) Okzhetpes) |
| 5 | DF | ARM | Robert Arzumanyan (loan from (Russia) Amkar Perm) |
| 7 | MF | NED | Desley Ubbink (from (Kazakhstan) Tobol) |
| 9 | FW | KAZ | Aidos Tattybayev (from (Kazakhstan) Bolat) |
| 10 | MF | FIN | Erfan Zeneli (from (Finland) HJK) |
| 11 | MF | KAZ | Maksat Baizhanov (from (Kazakhstan) Atyrau) |
| 20 | DF | BLR | Ivan Sadownichy (from (Kazakhstan) Tobol) |
| 24 | DF | UKR | Oleksiy Kurylov (from (Ukraine) Metalist Kharkiv) |
| 25 | GK | KAZ | Serhiy Tkachuk (from (Kazakhstan) Kairat) |
| 27 | MF | SVK | Július Szöke (from (Slovakia) Podbrezová) |
| 34 | DF | KAZ | Igor Pikalkin (from (Kazakhstan) Astana) |
| 77 | DF | KAZ | Yevgeni Goryachi (from (Kazakhstan) Zhetysu) |
| 97 | MF | FIN | Moshtagh Yaghoubi (loan from (Latvia) Spartaks Jūrmala) |

Out: Note: Flags indicate national team as defined under FIFA eligibility rules; some limited exceptions apply. Players may hold more than one non-FIFA nationality.

| No. | Pos. | Nation | Player |
|---|---|---|---|
| 3 | DF | KAZ | Alexey Muldarov (to (Kazakhstan) Atyrau) |
| 4 | DF | BIH | Nikola Vasiljević (to (Bosnia and Herzegovina) Drina Zvornik) |
| 6 | MF | KAZ | Andrei Karpovich (to (Kazakhstan) Altai Semey) |
| 9 | MF | AUT | Mihret Topčagić (to (Austria) Rheindorf Altach) |
| 10 | FW | UKR | Maksym Feshchuk (to (Moldova) Dacia Chișinău) |
| 13 | GK | KAZ | Alexander Zarutsky |
| 17 | DF | BLR | Andrey Paryvayew (to (Belarus) Isloch Minsk Raion) |
| 20 | DF | BIH | Aldin Đidić (to (Bosnia and Herzegovina) Čelik Zenica) |
| 23 | MF | KAZ | Yevgeny Kostrub (to (Kazakhstan) Altai Semey) |
| 24 | FW | CZE | Jan Vošahlík (to (Czech Republic) 1. FK Příbram) |
| 35 | GK | KAZ | Aleksandr Mokin (to (Kazakhstan) Astana) |
| 45 | FW | KAZ | Roman Murtazayev (to (Kazakhstan) Irtysh Pavlodar) |
| 52 | DF | TTO | Aubrey David (to (Costa Rica) Deportivo Saprissa) |
| 70 | MF | BUL | Plamen Dimov (to (Kazakhstan) Altai Semey) |

Trialists: Note: Flags indicate national team as defined under FIFA eligibility rules; some limited exceptions apply. Players may hold more than one non-FIFA nationality.

| No. | Pos. | Nation | Player |
|---|---|---|---|
| — | GK | KAZ | Stanislav Pavlov |
| — | DF | BIH | Toni Markić |
| — | DF | LAT | Nauris Bulvītis |
| — | DF | NCA | Luis Fernando Copete |
| — | DF | SRB | Mario Maslać |
| — | MF | GER | Savio Nsereko |
| — | MF | AFG | Sharif Mukhammad |
| — | FW | GHA | Ransford Osei |
| — | FW | RUS | Shamil Asildarov |

=== Summer ===
In: Note: Flags indicate national team as defined under FIFA eligibility rules; some limited exceptions apply. Players may hold more than one non-FIFA nationality.

| No. | Pos. | Nation | Player |
|---|---|---|---|
| 3 | DF | BIH | Nikola Vasiljević (from (Bosnia and Herzegovina) Drina Zvornik) |
| 18 | MF | SVK | Štefan Zošák (from (Slovakia) Ružomberok) |
| 24 | FW | MKD | Marko Simonovski (from (Kazakhstan) Zhetysu) |
| 89 | FW | SVK | Filip Serečin (from (Slovakia) Zemplín Michalovce) |

Out: Note: Flags indicate national team as defined under FIFA eligibility rules; some limited exceptions apply. Players may hold more than one non-FIFA nationality.

| No. | Pos. | Nation | Player |
|---|---|---|---|
| 10 | MF | FIN | Erfan Zeneli (to (Finland) Inter Turku) |
| 24 | DF | UKR | Oleksiy Kurylov |
| 97 | MF | FIN | Moshtagh Yaghoubi (loan return to (Latvia) Spartaks Jūrmala) |

== Friendlies ==
| 3 February 2015 | Jagodina (Serbia) | 1 – 0 | (Kazakhstan) Shakhter Karagandy | Antalya, Turkey |
| 15:00 ALMT (UTC+6) | Goal | Summary |

| 3 February 2015 | Jagodina (Serbia) | 1 – 1 | (Kazakhstan) Shakhter Karagandy | Antalya, Turkey |
| ALMT (UTC+6) | Goal | Summary | Zhangylyshbay |

| 6 February 2015 | Vorskla Poltava (Ukraine) | 1 – 0 | (Kazakhstan) Shakhter Karagandy | Antalya, Turkey |
| ALMT (UTC+6) | Tkachuk 28' | Summary |

| 9 February 2015 | Novi Pazar (Serbia) | 1 – 3 | (Kazakhstan) Shakhter Karagandy | Antalya, Turkey |
| ALMT (UTC+6) | 10' | Summary | Zeneli 19'; K.Ermekov 32', 55' |

| 12 February 2015 | Istiklol (Tajikistan) | 2 – 2 | (Kazakhstan) Shakhter Karagandy | Antalya, Turkey |
| ALMT (UTC+6) | Nazarov 42'; Kholmatov 75'; Davronov (yellow card); Umarbayev (yellow card) | Summary | Copete 34'; R.Kenetaev 65' |

| 20 February 2015 | Karpaty Lviv (Ukraine) | – | (Kazakhstan) Shakhter Karagandy | Antalya, Turkey |
| ALMT (UTC+6) | | [ Summary] |

| 23 February 2015 | Illichivets Mariupol (Ukraine) | – | (Kazakhstan) Shakhter Karagandy | Antalya, Turkey |
| ALMT (UTC+6) | | [ Summary] |

| 26 February 2015 | Helios Kharkiv (Ukraine) | – | (Kazakhstan) Shakhter Karagandy | Antalya, Turkey |
| ALMT (UTC+6) | | [ Summary] |

== Competitions ==
=== Kazakhstan Premier League ===
==== Regular season ====
===== Results summary =====
| Overall | | | | | | | | Home | | | | | | Away | | | | | |
| Pld | W | D | L | GF | GA | GD | Pts | W | D | L | GF | GA | GD | W | D | L | GF | GA | GD |
|---|---|---|---|---|---|---|---|---|---|---|---|---|---|---|---|---|---|---|---|
| 22 | 5 | 6 | 11 | 10 | 27 | −17 | 21 | 3 | 3 | 5 | 6 | 12 | −6 | 2 | 3 | 6 | 4 | 15 | −11 |

Last updated: 8 August 2016.
Source: See Results

===== Results by round =====
| Round | 1 | 2 | 3 | 4 | 5 | 6 | 7 | 8 | 9 | 10 | 11 | 12 | 13 | 14 | 15 | 16 | 17 | 18 | 19 | 20 | 21 | 22 |
|---|---|---|---|---|---|---|---|---|---|---|---|---|---|---|---|---|---|---|---|---|---|---|
| Ground | A | H | A | H | A | H | A | H | A | A | H | A | H | A | H | A | H | A | H | H | A | H |
| Result | L | D | L | L | D | L | W | D | W | L | L | L | W | D | L | L | W | D | L | D | L | W |
| Position | 9 | 10 | 12 | 12 | 11 | 12 | 12 | 11 | 8 | 8 | 10 | 10 | 10 | 10 | 10 | 10 | 10 | 10 | 10 | 10 | 11 | 10 |

Source: See Results
A = Away; H = Home; W = Win; D = Draw; L = Loss

===== Results =====
| 12 March 2016 1 | Astana | 2 – 1 | Shakhter Karagandy | Astana |
| 16:00 (UTC+6) | Despotović 47'; Nusserbayev 65' | Summary | Ubbink 7'; Baizhanov (yellow card) 61' | Stadium: Astana Arena; Referee: Bagdat Abdullaev |

| 20 March 2016 2 | Shakhter Karagandy | 0 – 0 | Zhetysu | Karaganda |
| 15:00 ALMT (UTC+6) | Y.Goryachi (yellow card) 50'; Arzumanyan (yellow card) 56' | Summary | | Stadium: Shakhter Stadium; Attendance: 3,000; Referee: Viktor Antonov |

| 3 April 2016 3 | Tobol | 3 – 0 | Shakhter Karagandy | Kostanay |
| 15:00 ALMT (UTC+6) | Mukhutdinov (yellow card) 21'; Yavorskyi 27'; Šimkovič 38'; Khizhnichenko 82' (yellow card) 90+4'; Dmitrenko (yellow card) 89' | Summary | Szöke (yellow card) 49'; Finonchenko (yellow card) 83' | Stadium: Central Stadium; Attendance: 3,000; Referee: Sergey Gorokhovodatskiy |

| 9 April 2016 4 | Shakhter Karagandy | 0 – 2 | Irtysh Pavlodar | Karaganda |
| 15:00 ALMT (UTC+6) | Baizhanov (yellow card) 51'; Szöke (yellow card) 54'; Sadownichy (yellow card) 90+1' | Summary | Freidgeimas 26'; Kerla 58'; Fonseca (yellow card) 70' | Stadium: Shakhter Stadium; Attendance: 1,000; Referee: Igor Chesnokov |

| 13 April 2016 5 | Kairat | 0 – 0 | Shakhter Karagandy | Almaty |
| 19:30 ALMT (UTC+6) | Islamkhan (yellow card) 20' (yellow-red card) 75' | Summary | Yaghoubi (yellow card) 20' | Stadium: Central Stadium; Attendance: 14,500; Referee: Anatolyi Vishnichenko |

| 17 April 2016 6 | Shakhter Karagandy | 0 – 1 | Okzhetpes | Karaganda |
| 15:00 ALMT (UTC+6) | Szöke (yellow card) 90+3' | Summary | Chyzhov 31'; Bogdanov (yellow card) 90+2' | Stadium: Shakhter Stadium; Attendance: 1,500; Referee: Akmalkhan Kholmatov |

| 23 April 2016 7 | Akzhayik | 0 – 1 | Shakhter Karagandy | Oral |
| 18:00 ALMT (UTC+6) | A.Shurygin (yellow card) 12'; Govedarica (yellow card) 79'; Nikolić (red card) 84' | Summary | Finonchenko 17'; Y.Baginskiy (yellow card) 87' | Stadium: Petr Atoyan Stadium; Attendance: 1,500; Referee: Ruslan Duzmambetov |

| 1 May 2016 8 | Shakhter Karagandy | 0 – 0 | Atyrau | Karaganda |
| 17:00 (UTC+6) | | Summary | V.Kuzmin (yellow card) 74' | Stadium: Shakhter Stadium; Attendance: 1,500; Referee: Aydin Rakhimbayev |

| 5 May 2016 9 | Taraz | 1 – 2 | Shakhter Karagandy | Taraz |
| 18:00 ALMT (UTC+6) | D.Evstigneev (yellow card) 86'; B.Baitana 90+3' | Summary | K.Ermekov (yellow card) 51'; Szöke (yellow card) 56'; A.Nurybekov (yellow card) 61'; Skorykh 71'; Finonchenko 76' | Stadium: Central Stadium; Attendance: 4,200; Referee: Marat Iskakov |

| 9 May 2016 10 | Ordabasy | 2 – 0 | Shakhter Karagandy | Shymkent |
| 17:00 (UTC+6) | Nurgaliev 22' (pen.) (yellow card) 32'; E.Tungyshbaev 47'; Diakate (yellow card) 59' | Summary | Y.Tarasov (yellow card) 21'; Ubbink (yellow card) 44'; Zeneli (yellow card) 84' | Stadium: Kazhymukan Munaitpasov Stadium; Attendance: 5,000; Referee: Igor Chesnokov |

| 14 May 2016 11 | Shakhter Karagandy | 0 – 2 | Aktobe | Karaganda |
| 17:00 ALMT (UTC+6) | A.Nurybekov (yellow card) 65' (yellow-red card) 71'; Y.Tarasov (yellow card) 88' | Summary | D.Zhalmukan 8'; Zhangylyshbay 38' | Stadium: Shakhter Stadium; Attendance: 2,500; Referee: Bolat Karlibayev |

| 21 May 2016 12 | Zhetysu | 2 – 0 | Shakhter Karagandy | Taldykorgan |
| 17:30 ALMT (UTC+6) | S.Sagyndykov (yellow card) 45+1'; Savić 57'; I.Kalinin 64'; Turysbek (yellow card) 84' | Summary | I.Pikalkin (yellow card) 45'; Yaghoubi (yellow card) 84' | Stadium: Zhetysu Stadium; Attendance: 2,300; Referee: Aleksander Gauzer |

| 29 May 2016 13 | Shakhter Karagandy | 1 – 0 | Tobol | Karaganda |
| 17:00 ALMT (UTC+6) | Ubbink (yellow card) 17'; Baizhanov 42'; Y.Tarasov (yellow card) 81'; Y.Baginskiy (yellow card) 88' | Summary | Zhumaskaliyev (yellow card) 35'; Kurgulin (yellow card) 85' | Stadium: Shakhter Stadium; Attendance: 1,000; Referee: Denis Izmailov |

| 2 June 2016 14 | Irtysh Pavlodar | 0 – 0 | Shakhter Karagandy | Pavlodar |
| 19:30 ALMT (UTC+6) | Freidgeimas (yellow card) 23'; R.Yesimov (yellow card) 57'; Geteriev (yellow card) 69' | Summary | Y.Tarasov (yellow card) 21'; Y.Baginskiy (yellow card) 90' | Stadium: Central Stadium; Attendance: 4,800; Referee: Askhat Abdanbayev |

| 11 June 2016 15 | Shakhter Karagandy | 0 – 5 | Kairat | Karaganda |
| 17:00 (UTC+6) | Ubbink (yellow card) 70'; Zeneli (yellow card) 70' | Summary | Isael 35'; Gohou 47'; A.Darabayev 58'; V.Plotnikov (yellow card) 70'; Kuat (yellow card) 70'; Islamkhan 90' (pen.), 90+2' | Stadium: Shakhter Stadium; Attendance: 4,500; Referee: Bagdat Abdullaev |

| 15 June 2016 16 | Okzhetpes | 3 – 0 | Shakhter Karagandy | Kokshetau |
| 19:00 ALMT (UTC+6) | Z.Moldakaraev 6', 42' (pen.); Chertov 68' | Summary | | Stadium: Okzhetpes Stadium; Attendance: 2,500; Referee: Viktor Antonov |

| 19 June 2016 17 | Shakhter Karagandy | 3 – 1 | Akzhayik | Karaganda |
| 17:00 ALMT (UTC+6) | Vasiljević 27' (yellow card) 49'; Ubbink 45+2', 86' (yellow card) 86' | Summary | Govedarica (yellow card) 71'; Lečić 90+3' | Stadium: Shakhter Stadium; Attendance: 2,000; Referee: Daniyar Sakhi |

| 25 June 2016 18 | Atyrau | 0 – 0 | Shakhter Karagandy | Atyrau |
| 20:00 (UTC+6) | Sharpar (yellow card) 81' | Summary | I.Pikalkin (yellow card) 43'; Sadownichy (yellow card) 51'; M.Gabyshev (yellow card) 82' | Stadium: Munaishy Stadium; Attendance: 4,500; Referee: Furkat Atajanow |

| 2 July 2016 19 | Shakhter Karagandy | 0 – 1 | Taraz | Karaganda |
| 17:00 ALMT (UTC+6) | Szöke (yellow card) 59' | Summary | Mané 33'; Grigoryev (yellow card) 87' | Stadium: Shakhter Stadium; Attendance: 2,000; Referee: Aleksandr Gauzer |

| 10 July 2016 20 | Shakhter Karagandy | 0 – 0 | Ordabasy | Karaganda |
| 17:00 ALMT (UTC+6) | A.Nurybekov (yellow card) 33' | Summary | Mukhtarov (yellow card) 70' | Stadium: Shakhter Stadium; Attendance: 2,000; Referee: Denis Izmailov |

| 17 July 2016 21 | Aktobe | 2 – 0 | Shakhter Karagandy | Aktobe |
| 20:00 ALMT (UTC+6) | L.Dao 22'; Mitošević (yellow card) 56'; Shchotkin 58' | Summary | Serečin (yellow card) 69'; Baizhanov (yellow card) 72' | Stadium: Central Stadium; Attendance: 4,000; Referee: Marat Iskakov |

| 7 August 2016 24 | Shakhter Karagandy | 2 – 0 | Astana | Karaganda |
| 17:00 ALMT (UTC+6) | Simonovski (yellow card) 57'; Vasiljević 67'; Y.Goryachi 87' (yellow card) 87' | Summary | Muzhikov (yellow card) 33'; Malyi (yellow card) 50'; Logvinenko (yellow card) 51'; Shomko (yellow card) 88' | Stadium: Shakhter Stadium; Attendance: 2,500; Referee: Aleksandr Gauzer |

===== League table =====
| Pos | Team | Pld | W | D | L | GF | GA | GD | Pts | Qualification |
|---|---|---|---|---|---|---|---|---|---|---|
| 8 | Tobol | 22 | 8 | 4 | 10 | 28 | 26 | +2 | 28 (Note: Head-to-head record: Aktobe (7 points), Atyrau (5 points), Tobol (4 points).) | Qualification for the relegation round |
| 9 | Zhetysu | 22 | 6 | 5 | 11 | 22 | 32 | −10 | 23 | Qualification for the relegation round |
| 10 | Shakhter Karagandy | 22 | 5 | 6 | 11 | 10 | 27 | −17 | 21 | Qualification for the relegation round |
| 11 | Taraz | 22 | 5 | 4 | 13 | 22 | 30 | −8 | 19 | Qualification for the relegation round |
| 12 | Akzhayik | 22 | 3 | 2 | 17 | 12 | 44 | −32 | 11 | Qualification for the relegation round |

Source: UEFA.com, Soccerway
Rules for classification: 1) Points; 2) Head-to-head points; 3) Head-to-head matches won; 4) Head-to-head goal difference; 5) Head-to-head goals scored; 6) Head-to-head away goals scored; 7) Goal difference; 8) Matches won; 9) Goals scored; 10) Away goals scored; 11) Draw.

==== Relegation round ====
===== Results summary =====
| Overall | | | | | | | | Home | | | | | | Away | | | | | |
| Pld | W | D | L | GF | GA | GD | Pts | W | D | L | GF | GA | GD | W | D | L | GF | GA | GD |
|---|---|---|---|---|---|---|---|---|---|---|---|---|---|---|---|---|---|---|---|
| 10 | 5 | 0 | 5 | 15 | 13 | +2 | 15 | 3 | 0 | 2 | 10 | 5 | +5 | 2 | 0 | 3 | 5 | 8 | −3 |

Last updated: 1 November 2016.
Source: See Results

===== Results by round =====
| Round | 1 | 2 | 3 | 4 | 5 | 6 | 7 | 8 | 9 | 10 |
|---|---|---|---|---|---|---|---|---|---|---|
| Ground | H | A | A | H | A | A | H | A | H | A |
| Result | W | L | L | W | W | W | L | L | W | L |
| Position | 9 | 10 | 10 | 10 | 9 | 8 | 8 | 9 | 8 | 9 |

Source: See Results
A = Away; H = Home; W = Win; D = Draw; L = Loss

===== Results =====
| 14 August 2016 1 | Shakhter Karagandy | 1 – 0 | Taraz | Karaganda |
| 18:00 (UTC+6) | Ubbink 66' | Summary | Mera (yellow card) 83' | Stadium: Shakhter Stadium; Attendance: 2,000; Referee: Sergey Gorokhovodatskiy |

| 21 August 2016 2 | Shakhter Karagandy | 0 – 1 | Akzhayik | Karaganda |
| 18:00 (UTC+6) | Simonovski (yellow card) 37'; Vasiljević (yellow card) 81' | Summary | Coronel 57' (pen.); B.Omarov (yellow card) 61'; E.Abdrakhmanov (yellow card) 67'; A.Totay (yellow card) 90+2' | Stadium: Shakhter Stadium; Attendance: 2,000; Referee: Aydin Rakhimbayev |

| 26 August 2016 3 | Tobol | 2 – 0 | Shakhter Karagandy | Kostanay |
| 19:00 (UTC+6) | Deac (yellow card) 19'; Khizhnichenko 66', 72' (yellow card) 70' | Summary | I.Pikalkin (yellow card) 3'; Y.Goryachi (yellow card) 70'; Simonovski (yellow card) 83' | Stadium: Central Stadium; Attendance: 2,000; Referee: Marat Iskakov |

| 10 September 2016 4 | Shakhter Karagandy | 3 – 0 | Atyrau | Karaganda |
| 19:00 (UTC+6) | Zošák 15'; Skorykh 38'; A.Tattybayev 59'; Szöke (yellow card) 68'; I.Pikalkin (yellow card) 77'; Shatskiy (yellow card) 89' | Summary | Essame (yellow card) 27'; R.Esatov (yellow card) 41' | Stadium: Shakhter Stadium; Attendance: 3,000; Referee: Denis Izmailov |

| 18 September 2016 5 | Zhetysu | 1 – 2 | Shakhter Karagandy | Taldykorgan |
| 16:00 (UTC+6) | Zhangylyshbay (yellow card) 28'; S.Sagyndykov (yellow card) 66'; Djermanović 82' | Summary | Y.Tarasov (yellow card) 56'; Szöke 90+1'; Y.Goryachi 90+4' | Stadium: Zhetysu Stadium; Attendance: 1,000; Referee: Sergey Gorokhovodatskiy |

| 24 September 2016 6 | Akzhayik | 1 – 2 | Shakhter Karagandy | Oral |
| 18:00 (UTC+6) | Lečić 61' (yellow card) 81'; E.Abdrakhmanov (yellow card) 64'; R.Rozybakiev (yellow card) 70' | Summary | Y.Goryachi 30'; Szöke 45' (yellow card) 81'; A.Tattybayev (yellow card) 83'; Skorykh (yellow card) 85' | Stadium: Petr Atoyan Stadium; Attendance: 2,000; Referee: Ruslan Duzmambetov |

| 1 October 2016 7 | Shakhter Karagandy | 2 – 3 | Tobol | Karaganda |
| 18:00 (UTC+6) | Simonovski 82', 85' | Summary | Glavina (yellow card) 11'; Khizhnichenko 53'; Šimkovič 67'; Deac 76'; Kurgulin (yellow card) 90+4' | Stadium: Shakhter Stadium; Attendance: 1,500; Referee: Marat Iskakov |

| 16 October 2016 8 | Atyrau | 2 – 0 | Shakhter Karagandy | Atyrau |
| 16:00 (UTC+6) | Arzhanov 17'; Muldarov (yellow card) 34'; Fedin (yellow card) 54'; A.Saparov (yellow card) 66'; Shabalin 78' | Summary | Ubbink (yellow card) 43'; Sadownichy (yellow card) 75'; Simonovski (yellow card) 83' | Stadium: Munaishy Stadium; Attendance: 2,000; Referee: Igor Aleshin |

| 22 October 2016 9 | Shakhter Karagandy | 4 – 1 | Zhetysu | Karaganda |
| 15:00 (UTC+6) | Szöke 12'; Baizhanov 43', 88'; Vasiljević (yellow card) 52'; Ubbink 69'; Skorykh (yellow card) 82' | Summary | S.Sagyndykov (yellow card) 22'; A.Shabaev (yellow card) 74'; Azovskiy 90+1' | Stadium: Shakhter Stadium; Attendance: 1,000; Referee: Aleksandr Aliyev |

| 29 October 2016 10 | Taraz | 2 – 1 | Shakhter Karagandy | Taraz |
| 15:00 (UTC+6) | Ergashev 54'; Kirov 77'; Mera (yellow card) 90+1' | Summary | Ubbink 73'; G.Dubkov (yellow card) 86' | Stadium: Central Stadium; Attendance: 2,800; Referee: Aydin Rakhimbayev |

===== League table =====
| Pos | Team | Pld | W | D | L | GF | GA | GD | Pts | Relegation |
|---|---|---|---|---|---|---|---|---|---|---|
| 7 | Tobol | 32 | 12 | 5 | 15 | 40 | 40 | 0 | 41 | |
| 8 | Atyrau | 32 | 10 | 9 | 13 | 35 | 39 | −4 | 39 | |
| 9 | Shakhter Karagandy | 32 | 10 | 6 | 16 | 25 | 40 | −15 | 36 | |
| 10 | Akzhayik | 32 | 11 | 2 | 19 | 27 | 50 | −23 | 35 (Note: Head-to-head record; Taraz–Akzhayik 0–1, Akzhayik–Taraz 2–1, Akzhayik–Taraz 2–0, Taraz–Akzhayik 2–1.) | |
| 11 | Taraz | 32 | 10 | 5 | 17 | 33 | 42 | −9 | 35 | Qualification for the relegation play-offs (Note: Despite finishing 11th and losing the relegation playoffs, Taraz were readmitted because only one team was given a license.) |
| 12 | Zhetysu (R) | 32 | 8 | 7 | 17 | 37 | 53 | −16 | 31 | Relegation to the Kazakhstan First Division |

Source: Soccerway
Rules for classification: 1) Points; 2) Head-to-head points; 3) Head-to-head matches won; 4) Head-to-head goal difference; 5) Head-to-head goals scored; 6) Head-to-head away goals scored; 7) Goal difference; 8) Matches won; 9) Goals scored; 10) Away goals scored; 11) Draw.
(R) Relegated

=== Kazakhstan Cup ===
| 27 April 2016 Last 16 | Kairat | 4 – 0 | Shakhter Karagandy | Almaty |
| 19:30 ALMT (UTC+6) | Tawamba 77'; Kuat 83'; Isael 90+2'; A.Darabayev 90+3' | Summary | | Stadium: Central Stadium; Referee: Daniyar Sakhi |

== Squad statistics ==
As of Match played 29 October 2016

=== Appearances and goals ===
| No. | Pos | Nat | Player | Total | | Premier League | | Kazakhstan Cup | |
| No. | Pos | Nat | Player | Apps | Goals | Apps | Goals | Apps | Goals |
|---|---|---|---|---|---|---|---|---|---|
| 1 | GK | (Kazakhstan) KAZ | Yaroslav Baginskiy | 15 | 0 | 14 | 0 | 1 | 0 |
| 3 | DF | (Bosnia and Herzegovina) BIH | Nikola Vasiljević | 16 | 2 | 16 | 2 | 0 | 0 |
| 4 | DF | (Kazakhstan) KAZ | Mikhail Gabyshev | 17 | 0 | 15+2 | 0 | 0 | 0 |
| 5 | DF | (Armenia) ARM | Robert Arzumanyan | 9 | 0 | 8 | 0 | 1 | 0 |
| 7 | MF | (Netherlands) NED | Desley Ubbink | 31 | 6 | 29+1 | 6 | 1 | 0 |
| 9 | FW | (Kazakhstan) KAZ | Aidos Tattybayev | 19 | 1 | 4+14 | 1 | 0+1 | 0 |
| 11 | MF | (Kazakhstan) KAZ | Maksat Baizhanov | 33 | 3 | 32 | 3 | 1 | 0 |
| 14 | FW | (Kazakhstan) KAZ | Andrei Finonchenko | 16 | 2 | 11+4 | 2 | 1 | 0 |
| 15 | DF | (Kazakhstan) KAZ | Gregory Dubkov | 5 | 0 | 2+3 | 0 | 0 | 0 |
| 16 | FW | (Kazakhstan) KAZ | Sergey Vetrov | 10 | 0 | 4+6 | 0 | 0 | 0 |
| 17 | MF | (Kazakhstan) KAZ | Aibar Nurybekov | 22 | 0 | 12+10 | 0 | 0 | 0 |
| 18 | MF | (Slovakia) SVK | Štefan Zošák | 14 | 1 | 14 | 1 | 0 | 0 |
| 19 | DF | (Kazakhstan) KAZ | Yevgeny Tarasov | 20 | 0 | 17+3 | 0 | 0 | 0 |
| 20 | DF | (Belarus) BLR | Ivan Sadownichy | 31 | 0 | 30 | 0 | 1 | 0 |
| 22 | MF | (Kazakhstan) KAZ | Sergei Skorykh | 31 | 2 | 26+4 | 2 | 1 | 0 |
| 24 | FW | (North Macedonia) MKD | Marko Simonovski | 10 | 2 | 7+3 | 2 | 0 | 0 |
| 25 | GK | (Kazakhstan) KAZ | Serhiy Tkachuk | 2 | 0 | 2 | 0 | 0 | 0 |
| 27 | MF | (Slovakia) SVK | Július Szöke | 29 | 3 | 29 | 3 | 0 | 0 |
| 30 | GK | (Kazakhstan) KAZ | Igor Shatskiy | 17 | 0 | 16+1 | 0 | 0 | 0 |
| 34 | DF | (Kazakhstan) KAZ | Igor Pikalkin | 25 | 0 | 21+4 | 0 | 0 | 0 |
| 44 | MF | (Kazakhstan) KAZ | Kuanysh Ermekov | 16 | 0 | 11+4 | 0 | 1 | 0 |
| 71 | FW | (Kazakhstan) KAZ | Vyacheslav Putintsev | 2 | 0 | 0+2 | 0 | 0 | 0 |
| 77 | DF | (Kazakhstan) KAZ | Yevgeni Goryachi | 20 | 3 | 10+9 | 3 | 1 | 0 |
| 88 | MF | (Kazakhstan) KAZ | Vladislav Vasiliev | 2 | 0 | 0+2 | 0 | 0 | 0 |
| 89 | FW | (Slovakia) SVK | Filip Serečin | 4 | 0 | 3+1 | 0 | 0 | 0 |
| 98 | FW | (Kazakhstan) KAZ | Oralkhan Omirtayev | 5 | 0 | 0+5 | 0 | 0 | 0 |
Players away from Shakhter Karagandy on loan:
Players who appeared for Shakhter Karagandy that left during the season:
| 10 | MF | (Finland) FIN | Erfan Zeneli | 15 | 0 | 10+4 | 0 | 1 | 0 |
| 24 | DF | (Ukraine) UKR | Oleksiy Kurilov | 4 | 0 | 4 | 0 | 0 | 0 |
| 97 | MF | (Finland) FIN | Moshtagh Yaghoubi | 12 | 0 | 5+6 | 0 | 1 | 0 |

=== Goal scorers ===
| Place | Position | Nation | Number | Name | Premier League | Kazakhstan Cup | Total |
|---|---|---|---|---|---|---|---|
| 1 | MF | (Netherlands) | 7 | Desley Ubbink | 6 | 0 | 6 |
| 2 | DF | (Kazakhstan) | 77 | Yevgeni Goryachi | 3 | 0 | 3 |
| 2 | MF | (Slovakia) | 27 | Július Szöke | 3 | 0 | 3 |
| 2 | MF | (Kazakhstan) | 11 | Maksat Baizhanov | 3 | 0 | 3 |
| 5 | FW | (Kazakhstan) | 14 | Andrei Finonchenko | 2 | 0 | 2 |
| 5 | DF | (Bosnia and Herzegovina) | 3 | Nikola Vasiljević | 2 | 0 | 1 |
| 5 | MF | (Kazakhstan) | 22 | Sergei Skorykh | 2 | 0 | 2 |
| 5 | FW | (North Macedonia) | 24 | Marko Simonovski | 2 | 0 | 2 |
| 8 | MF | (Slovakia) | 18 | Štefan Zošák | 1 | 0 | 1 |
| 8 | FW | (Kazakhstan) | 9 | Aidos Tattybayev | 1 | 0 | 1 |
| | | | | TOTALS | 25 | 0 | 25 |

=== Disciplinary record ===
| Number | Nation | Position | Name | Premier League | | Kazakhstan Cup | | Total | |
| Number | Nation | Position | Name | Yellow card | Red card | Yellow card | Red card | Yellow card | Red card |
| 1 | (Kazakhstan) | GK | Yaroslav Baginskiy | 3 | 0 | 0 | 0 | 3 | 0 |
| 3 | (Bosnia and Herzegovina) | DF | Nikola Vasiljević | 3 | 0 | 0 | 0 | 3 | 0 |
| 4 | (Kazakhstan) | DF | Mikhail Gabyshev | 1 | 0 | 0 | 0 | 1 | 0 |
| 5 | (Armenia) | DF | Robert Arzumanyan | 1 | 0 | 0 | 0 | 1 | 0 |
| 7 | (Netherlands) | MF | Desley Ubbink | 5 | 0 | 0 | 0 | 5 | 0 |
| 9 | (Kazakhstan) | FW | Aidos Tattybayev | 1 | 0 | 0 | 0 | 1 | 0 |
| 10 | (Finland) | MF | Erfan Zeneli | 2 | 0 | 0 | 0 | 2 | 0 |
| 11 | (Kazakhstan) | MF | Maksat Baizhanov | 3 | 0 | 0 | 0 | 3 | 0 |
| 14 | (Kazakhstan) | FW | Andrei Finonchenko | 1 | 0 | 0 | 0 | 1 | 0 |
| 15 | (Kazakhstan) | DF | Gregory Dubkov | 1 | 0 | 0 | 0 | 1 | 0 |
| 17 | (Kazakhstan) | MF | Aibar Nurybekov | 4 | 1 | 0 | 0 | 4 | 1 |
| 19 | (Kazakhstan) | DF | Yevgeny Tarasov | 5 | 0 | 0 | 0 | 5 | 0 |
| 20 | (Belarus) | DF | Ivan Sadownichy | 3 | 0 | 0 | 0 | 3 | 0 |
| 22 | (Kazakhstan) | MF | Sergei Skorykh | 2 | 0 | 0 | 0 | 2 | 0 |
| 24 | (North Macedonia) | FW | Marko Simonovski | 4 | 0 | 0 | 0 | 4 | 0 |
| 27 | (Slovakia) | MF | Július Szöke | 7 | 0 | 0 | 0 | 7 | 0 |
| 30 | (Kazakhstan) | GK | Igor Shatskiy | 1 | 0 | 0 | 0 | 1 | 0 |
| 34 | (Kazakhstan) | DF | Igor Pikalkin | 4 | 0 | 0 | 0 | 4 | 0 |
| 44 | (Kazakhstan) | MF | Kuanysh Ermekov | 1 | 0 | 0 | 0 | 1 | 0 |
| 77 | (Kazakhstan) | DF | Yevgeni Goryachi | 3 | 0 | 0 | 0 | 3 | 0 |
| 89 | (Slovakia) | FW | Filip Serečin | 1 | 0 | 0 | 0 | 1 | 0 |
| 97 | (Finland) | MF | Moshtagh Yaghoubi | 2 | 0 | 0 | 0 | 2 | 0 |
| | | | TOTALS | 58 | 1 | 0 | 0 | 58 | 1 |
