= Alain Bono =

Cameroonian footballer

Personal information
- Full name: Alain Elvis Bono Mack Mboune
- Date of birth: 19 December 1983 (age 42)
- Place of birth: Douala, Cameroon
- Height: 1.88 m (6 ft 2 in)
- Positions: Centre-back; midfielder

Youth career
- Paris Saint-Germain
- 2001: Lecco

Senior career*
Years	Team	Apps	(Gls)
2001–2007	Ternana	58	(0)
2002–2003	→ Alessandria (loan)	26	(0)
2004	→ Paternò (loan)	6	(0)
2007	Teramo	12	(1)
2007–2008	Widzew Łódź	5	(0)
2008–2009	Paris FC	8	(0)
2010–2011	Aktobe	28	(0)
2011	KuPS	9	(1)
Total		152	(2)
- * Club domestic league appearances and goals

Alain Elvis Bono Mack Mboune (born 19 December 1983) is a Cameroonian former professional footballer who played primarily as a midfielder.

== Club career ==
Bono has previously played for Ternana Calcio in the Italian Serie B, for Widzew Łódź in the Polish Ekstraklasa, and for Kazakhstan Premier League champions FC Aktobe. He finished his career after a stint with Kuopion Palloseura in Finnish Veikkausliiga in 2011.

== Career statistics ==
Appearances and goals by club, season and competition
Club	Season	League			National cup (Note: Includes Coppa Italia, Polish Cup, Coupe de France, Kazakhstan Cup and Suomen Cup)		Europe		Total	
Club	Season	Division	Apps	Goals	Apps	Goals	Apps	Goals	Apps	Goals
Alessandria (loan)	2002–03	Serie C2	26	0	–		–		26	0
Paternò (loan)	2003–04	Serie C1	8	0	–		–		8	0
Ternana	2004–05	Serie B	23	0	2	0	–		25	0
Ternana	2005–06	Serie B	29	0	1	0	–		30	0
Ternana	2006–07	Serie C1	7	0	1	0	–		8	0
Ternana	Total		59	0	4	0	0	0	63	0
Teramo	2006-07	Serie C1	14	1	–		–		14	1
Widzew Łódź	2007–08	Ekstraklasa	5	0	1	0	–		6	0
Paris FC	2008–09	National	8	0	1	0	–		9	0
Aktobe	2010	Kazakhstan Premier League	15	0	2	0	5 (Note: Appearances in UEFA Champions League and UEFA Europa League)	0	22	0
Aktobe	2011	Kazakhstan Premier League	13	0	1	0	–		14	0
Aktobe	Total		28	0	3	0	5	0	36	0
KuPS	2011	Veikkausliiga	9	1	1	0	–		10	1
Career total			157	2	10	0	5	0	172	2
