= Abzal Zhumabaev =

Kazakhstani footballer

Personal information
- Date of birth: 28 May 1986 (age 40)
- Place of birth: Soviet Union
- Height: 1.77 m (5 ft 9 1/2 in)
- Position: Defender

Team information
- Current team: FC Atyrau
- Number: 3

Senior career*
Years	Team	Apps	(Gls)
2006–2008	FC Almaty	76	(0)
2009–	FC Atyrau	14	(0)

International career^{‡}
2006	Kazakhstan	1	(0)
- * Club domestic league appearances and goals as of December 2009 ‡ National team caps and goals as of 24 January 2010

Abzal Zhumabaev (Kazakh: Абзал Жұмабаев; born 28 May 1986) is a Kazakhstani football defender who plays for the club FC Atyrau. He has also played for the Kazakhstan national football team.

== Career ==
Zhumabaev began his career with FC Almaty, but joined Atyrau in 2009. His first season with the club was interrupted by injury and he only appeared in 14 league matches.
