= Sergei Glazyukov =

Russian footballer

Personal information
- Full name: Sergei Aleksandrovich Glazyukov
- Date of birth: 23 September 1986 (age 40)
- Height: 1.78 m (5 ft 10 in)
- Position: Forward

Youth career
- Dynamo Saint Petersburg

Senior career*
| Years | Team | Apps | (Gls) |
| 2005 | Nara-Desna Naro-Fominsk | 3 | (0) |
| 2006 | Petrotrest Saint Petersburg | 32 | (10) |
| 2007–2008 | Dynamo Vologda | 47 | (12) |
| 2009 | Rotor Volgograd | 16 | (5) |
| 2009 | Nosta Novotroitsk | 5 | (0) |
| 2010 | Okzhetpes | 14 | (0) |
| 2010 | Dynamo Stavropol | 14 | (3) |
| 2011 | Vitebsk | 22 | (2) |
| 2012 | Trevis i VVK Saint Petersburg | 4 | (1) |
- * Club domestic league appearances and goals

Sergei Aleksandrovich Glazyukov (Russian: Серге́й Александрович Глазюков; born 23 September 1986) is a former Russian professional football player.

== Club career ==
He played in the Russian Football National League for FC Nosta Novotroitsk in 2009.
