= Sergei Skorykh =

Kazakhstani footballer

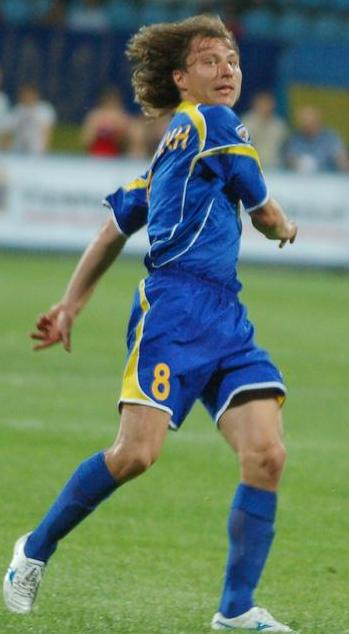

Personal information
- Date of birth: 25 May 1984 (age 42)
- Place of birth: Petropavl, Soviet Union
- Height: 1.85 m (6 ft 1 in)
- Position: Midfielder

Senior career*
Years	Team	Apps	(Gls)
2001–2002	Esil Bogatyr	34	(4)
2003–2005	Irtysh	64	(5)
2006–2009	Tobol	96	(8)
2010	Shakhter Karagandy	20	(1)
2011–2013	Zhetysu	69	(2)
2013–2014	Taraz	43	(3)
2015	Kaisar	7	(0)
2015–2017	Shakhter Karagandy	51	(2)
2018	Kyzylzhar	21	(0)
2019	Shakhter Karagandy	9	(0)
2020	Kyzylzhar	0	(0)

International career
2003–2011	Kazakhstan	28	(0)
- * Club domestic league appearances and goals as of 22:47, 6 June 2019 (UTC)

Sergei Skorykh (born 25 May 1984) is a Kazakh football midfielder.

== Career statistics ==
=== Club ===
As of match played 11 November 2018

Appearances and goals by club, season and competition
Club	Season	League			National Cup		Continental		Other		Total	
Club	Season	Division	Apps	Goals	Apps	Goals	Apps	Goals	Apps	Goals	Apps	Goals
Esil Bogatyr	2001	Kazakhstan Premier League	3	1			-		-		3	1
Esil Bogatyr	2002	Kazakhstan Premier League	31	4			-		-		31	4
Esil Bogatyr	Total		34	5			-	-	-	-	34	5
Irtysh	2003	Kazakhstan Premier League	28	4			-		-		28	4
Irtysh	2004	Kazakhstan Premier League	28	1			-		-		28	1
Irtysh	2005	Kazakhstan Premier League	8	0			-		-		8	0
Irtysh	Total		64	5			-	-	-	-	64	5
Tobol	2006	Kazakhstan Premier League	19	0			-		-		19	0
Tobol	2007	Kazakhstan Premier League	27	1			-		-		27	1
Tobol	2008	Kazakhstan Premier League	27	2			1	0	-		0	0
Tobol	2009	Kazakhstan Premier League	23	5			2	0	-		0	0
Tobol	Total		96	8			3	0	-	-	99	8
Shakhter Karagandy	2010	Kazakhstan Premier League	20	1	2	0	2	0	-		24	1
Zhetysu	2011	Kazakhstan Premier League	30	1			-		-		30	1
Zhetysu	2012	Kazakhstan Premier League	25	1	3	0	2	0	-		30	1
Zhetysu	2013	Kazakhstan Premier League	14	0	0	0	-		-		14	0
Zhetysu	Total		69	2	3	0	2	0	-	-	74	2
Taraz	2013	Kazakhstan Premier League	16	1	2	0	-		-		18	1
Taraz	2014	Kazakhstan Premier League	27	2	2	0	-		1	0	30	2
Taraz	Total		43	3	4	0	-	-	1	0	48	3
Kaisar	2015	Kazakhstan Premier League	7	0	2	0	-		-		9	0
Shakhter Karagandy	2015	Kazakhstan Premier League	1	0	0	0	-		-		1	0
Shakhter Karagandy	2016	Kazakhstan Premier League	30	2	1	0	-		-		31	2
Shakhter Karagandy	2017	Kazakhstan Premier League	20	0	3	0	-		-		23	0
Shakhter Karagandy	Total		51	2	4	0	-	-	-	-	55	2
Kyzylzhar	2018	Kazakhstan Premier League	21	0	0	0	-		-		21	0
Career total			405	26	15	0	7	0	1	0	428	26

=== International ===
Kazakhstan national team
Year	Apps	Goals
2003	2	0
2004	0	0
2005	0	0
2006	1	0
2007	10	0
2008	7	0
2009	5	0
2010	2	0
2011	1	0
Total	28	0

Statistics accurate as of match played 1 December 2014
