= Jimmy Mulisa =

Rwandan footballer

Personal information
- Date of birth: 3 April 1984 (age 42)
- Place of birth: Kigali, Rwanda
- Height: 1.85 m (6 ft 1 in)
- Position: Striker

Senior career*
Years	Team	Apps	(Gls)
2001–2002	HAL Bengaluru	15	(3)
2002–2005	APR FC		
2005	Haiphong FC		(4)
2005	RAEC Mons	12	(1)
2006	KRC Mechelen	13	(1)
2006–2007	RFC Tournai	25	(12)
2007–2008	KFC Hamme	15	(7)
2008–2010	SV Roeselare	13	(1)
2008–2009	→ KSK Beveren (loan)	12	(5)
2010	Ceahlăul Piatra Neamţ	15	(2)
2010	Shakhter Karagandy	13	(0)
2011	FC Vostok	9	(1)
2012–2013	A.F.C. Tubize	19	(1)
2013–2014	K. Berchem Sport	18	(4)
2014	T-Team		

International career
2003–2009	Rwanda	17	(2)

Managerial career
- 2015: FC Sunrise
- 2016: Rwanda
- 2016–2018: APR FC
- * Club domestic league appearances and goals

Jimmy Mulisa (born 24 April 1984) is a Rwanda former professional footballer who played as a striker. He was head coach at FC Sunrise, APR FC and Rwanda's national team.

== Club career ==
Mulisa began his senior club career in India, with ITI Bengaluru and he then moved to National Football League club Hindustan Aeronautics Limited, scoring three goals in 15 matches. He played the 2008–09 season for K.F.C. V.W. Hamme in Belgium.

In April 2014, Mulisa was signed by T-Team F.C. of Malaysia after trialling with the team.

== International career ==
Mulisa has made several appearances for the Rwanda national team, including 11 qualifying matches for the 2006 and 2010 FIFA World Cups.

== Managerial career ==
In summer 2015 he was appointed both as an assistant coach of the Rwanda national team, and as manager of Sunrise FC, but in September 2015 became manager of Isonga FC instead. He became manager of the national team on an interim basis in August 2016. In November 2016, Mulisa became manager of APR FC.

He became assistant coach of AS Kigali in July 2021, and became caretaker manager of AS Kigali in December 2021.

== Career statistics ==
=== International ===
Scores and results list Rwanda's goal tally first, score column indicates score after each Mulisa goal.

List of international goals scored by Jimmy Mulisa
No.	Date	Venue	Opponent	Score	Result	Competition
1	19 June 2004	Amahoro Stadium, Kigali, Rwanda	Gabon	2–1	3–1	2006 FIFA World Cup qualification
2	14 August 2004	?, Kampala, Uganda	Uganda	?–?	2–1	Friendly
