= 2010 Kazakhstan Premier League =

Kazakhstan Premier League
- Season: 2010
- Champions: Tobol
- Relegated: Akzhayik; Okzhetpes
- Champions League: Tobol
- Europa League: Aktobe; Irtysh; Shakhter
- Matches: 192
- Goals: 440 (2.29 per match)
- Top goalscorer: Ulugbek Bakayev (14)
- Biggest home win: Tobol 4–0 Okzhetpes; Lokomotiv 4–0 Okzhetpes; Lokomotiv 4–0 Shakhter; Tobol 4–0 Irtysh
- Biggest away win: Okzhetpes 0–6 Atyrau
- Highest scoring: Okzhetpes 0–6 Atyrau; Okzhetpes 2–4 Irtysh; Taraz 1-5 Shakhter

The 2010 Kazakhstan Premier League was the 19th season of the Kazakhstan Premier League, the highest football league competition in Kazakhstan. It started on 22 March 2010 and the regular season ended on 14 August 2010. The playoff rounds began on 22 August 2010 and ended on 6 November 2010. Aktobe are the defending champions, having won their fourth league title in five seasons and their third in a row last season.

This year's competition was completed in two stages. The first stage consisted of all 12 clubs playing against each other twice, once at home and once away. After these matches were completed, the league was split into two halves for the second stage, where each club played every other club in its group twice, once at home and once away. The top six clubs played for the league title while the bottom six clubs played to avoid relegation.

== Teams ==
Kyzylzhar, Kaisar and Kazakhmys were relegated to the Kazakhstan First Division at the end of last season for finishing at the bottom of the league. Because of the league's contraction to twelve clubs for this season, only the First Division champions, Kairat, were promoted in their places.

Okzhetpes finished 11th in last season's competition and took part in a promotion/relegation playoff against the First Division runners-up, Akzhayik, for one spot in this year's competition. Akzhayik won this match 3–2. However, during the off-season, Vostok were expelled from this year's competition due to unpaid debts. Therefore, Okzhetpes will retain their spot in the Premier League.

=== Stadia and locations ===
Locations of teams in the 2010 Kazakhstan Premier League

Team	Location	Venue	Capacity	Average attendance
Aktobe	Aktobe	Aktobe Central Stadium	13,500	8,333 (61.7%)
Akzhayik	Oral	Petr Atoyan Stadium	8,320	4,650 (55.9%)
Atyrau	Atyrau	Munayshy Stadium	8,660	5,000 (57.7%)
Irtysh	Pavlodar	Pavlodar Central Stadium	15,000	4,769 (31.8%)
Kairat	Almaty	Almaty Central Stadium	25,057	1,115
Lokomotiv	Astana	Astana Arena	30,000	4,787 (16%)
Okzhetpes	Kokshetau	Okzhetpes Stadium	4,158	1,637 (39.4%)
Ordabasy	Shymkent	K. Munaitpasov Stadium, Shymkent	37,000	3,688 (10%)
Shakhter	Karagandy	Shakhtyor Stadium	19,000	5,536 (29.1%)
Taraz	Taraz	Taraz Central Stadium	12,525	4,188 (33.4%)
Tobol	Kostanay	Kostanay Central Stadium	8,323	5,714 (68.7%)
Zhetysu	Taldykorgan	Zhetysu Stadium	4,000	1,981 (49.5%)

== First round ==
Pos	Team	Pld	W	D	L	GF	GA	GD	Pts	Qualification
1	Tobol	22	14	5	3	37	15	+22	47	Qualification for the championship round
2	Irtysh Pavlodar	22	12	7	3	30	16	+14	43	Qualification for the championship round
3	Aktobe	22	11	4	7	32	22	+10	37	Qualification for the championship round
4	Shakhter Karagandy	22	11	4	7	28	19	+9	37	Qualification for the championship round
5	Lokomotiv	22	11	3	8	33	21	+12	36	Qualification for the championship round
6	Atyrau	22	11	3	8	29	26	+3	36	Qualification for the championship round
7	Zhetysu	22	9	7	6	22	16	+6	34	Qualification for the relegation round
8	Ordabasy	22	8	6	8	20	20	0	30	Qualification for the relegation round
9	Kairat	22	4	8	10	11	22	−11	20	Qualification for the relegation round
10	Taraz	22	4	6	12	21	33	−12	18	Qualification for the relegation round
11	Akzhayik	22	3	5	14	19	43	−24	14	Qualification for the relegation round
12	Okzhetpes	22	3	4	15	16	45	−29	13	Qualification for the relegation round

Source: Soccerway
Rules for classification: 1st points; Two team tiebreak: 1st overall wins; 2nd head-to-head record; 3rd goals difference; 4th goals scored; 5th away goals scored; Multiple teams tiebreak: 1st overall wins; 2nd goals difference; 3rd goals scored; 4th away goals scored

== Final league table ==
Pos	Team	Pld	W	D	L	GF	GA	GD	Pts	Qualification or relegation
1	Tobol (C)	32	19	7	6	53	25	+28	64	Qualification for the Champions League second qualifying round
2	Aktobe	32	19	6	7	56	30	+26	63	Qualification for the Europa League second qualifying round (Note: Because Lokomotiv Astana, the winners of the 2010 Kazakhstan Cup, did not exist for at least three years and could not obtain a UEFA license, the second-placed team of the league, Aktobe, moved up to enter the second qualifying round, and the cup runners-up, Shakhter Karagandy, claimed the vacant Europa League spot in the first qualifying round.)
3	Irtysh Pavlodar	32	16	8	8	39	30	+9	56	Qualification for the Europa League first qualifying round
4	Lokomotiv	32	14	8	10	41	28	+13	50	
5	Atyrau	32	13	5	14	36	44	−8	44	
6	Shakhter Karagandy	32	11	8	13	32	30	+2	41	Qualification for the Europa League first qualifying round
7	Zhetysu	32	13	10	9	36	26	+10	49	
8	Ordabasy	32	12	9	11	37	34	+3	45	
9	Taraz	32	9	10	13	36	40	−4	37	
10	Kairat	32	6	11	15	17	38	−21	29	
11	Akzhayik (R)	32	7	5	20	33	58	−25	26	Relegation to the Kazakhstan First Division
12	Okzhetpes (R)	32	6	7	19	24	57	−33	25	Relegation to the Kazakhstan First Division

Source: kff.kz (in Russian)
Rules for classification: 1st points; 2nd overall wins; 3rd goal difference; 4th goals scored.
(C) Champions; (R) Relegated

== Results ==
=== First stage ===
During these matches, each team played each other team twice (once at home and once away).

Home \ Away	AKT	AKZ	ATY	IRT	KRT	LOK	OKZ	ORD	SHA	TAR	TOB	ZHE
Aktobe		4–1	3–0	0–0	1–0	1–2	4–1	1–1	0–1	2–1	1–3	2–1
Akzhayik	1–1		1–1	1–4	2–2	2–2	2–0	2–1	0–3	2–3	0–2	0–2
Atyrau	2–1	2–0		0–3	2–0	2–1	1–0	1–0	1–0	1–0	1–3	1–2
Irtysh Pavlodar	2–1	1–0	3–0		0–0	3–1	1–0	0–0	3–1	2–1	0–0	1–0
Kairat	0–2	0–0	1–0	0–0		2–2	1–0	1–0	0–1	0–0	0–1	0–3
Lokomotiv	0–1	2–0	1–0	3–0	0–0		4–0	1–0	4–0	3–0	2–0	1–0
Okzhetpes	0–1	0–1	0–6	2–4	0–1	2–1		3–2	0–1	2–2	1–3	0–0
Ordabasy	0–2	2–0	2–1	1–0	1–1	3–1	1–1		1–0	1–0	1–2	2–1
Shakhter Karagandy	2–0	3–2	1–1	0–1	1–0	3–1	2–0	0–1		2–0	1–1	1–2
Taraz	2–2	3–0	1–2	1–1	2–1	1–0	1–2	0–0	1–5		0–1	2–2
Tobol	2–1	3–1	2–2	4–1	3–1	0–1	4–0	2–0	0–0	1–0		0–1
Zhetysu	0–1	2–1	1–2	0–0	1–0	1–0	2–2	0–0	0–0	1–0	0–0	

Source: kff.kz (in Russian)
Legend: Blue = home team win; Yellow = draw; Red = away team win.

=== Second stage ===
During these matches, each team played every other team in their half of the table twice (once at home and once away).

Top six
Home \ Away	AKT	ATY	IRT	LOK	SHA	TOB
Aktobe		2–0	1–0	1–1	2–0	2–0
Atyrau	2–5		1–2	0–0	1–1	0–2
Irtysh Pavlodar	1–3	1–2		0–1	1–0	2–1
Lokomotiv	2–2	2–0	0–1		1–1	0–0
Shakhter Karagandy	0–1	0–1	1–1	0–1		0–1
Tobol	2–5	3–0	4–0	2–0	1–1	

Source: kff.kz (in Russian)
Legend: Blue = home team win; Yellow = draw; Red = away team win.

Bottom six
Home \ Away	AKZ	KRT	OKZ	ORD	TAR	ZHE
Akzhayik		2–0	2–0	4–0	1–2	0–3
Kairat	2–1		1–0	1–5	0–3	0–1
Okzhetpes	1–0	1–1		3–1	0–0	1–0
Ordabasy	1–2	1–1	4–1		1–0	1–1
Taraz	2–0	0–0	3–1	1–1		1–1
Zhetysu	4–2	2–0	0–0	0–2	2–3	

Source: kff.kz (in Russian)
Legend: Blue = home team win; Yellow = draw; Red = away team win.

== Top goalscorers ==
Source: KFF (in Russian).

Rank	Scorer	Club	Goals
1	(Uzbekistan) Ulugbek Bakayev	Tobol	16 (6 by PK)
2	(Kazakhstan) Nurbol Zhumaskaliyev	Tobol	15
3	(Bulgaria) Georgi Daskalov	Irtysh Pavlodar	15 (2)
4	(Ghana) Moses Sakyi	Akzhayik	14 (5)
5	(Serbia) Danilo Belic	Zhetysu	13 (3)
6	(Moldova) Igor Bugaev	Lokomotiv Astana	11 (2)
7	(Kazakhstan) Murat Tleshev	Aktobe	10
