= Vladica Ćurčić =

Serbian footballer

Personal information
- Date of birth: 18 July 1978 (age 48)
- Place of birth: Ivanjica, SR Serbia
- Height: 1.80 m (5 ft 11 in)
- Position: Midfielder

Senior career*
Years	Team	Apps	(Gls)
1998–2000	Javor Ivanjica		
2000	Alania Vladikavkaz	1	(0)
2001	Kairat Almaty	14	(1)
2002	Vostok Altyn	26	(8)
2003	Aktobe-Lento	9	(0)
2004	Traktor Tashkent	9	(0)
2004	Zhetysu	14	(0)
2005–2006	Shakhter Karagandy	33	(3)
- * Club domestic league appearances and goals

Vladica Ćurčić (Serbian: Владица Ћурчић; born 18 July 1978 in Ivanjica) is a former Serbian football player.
