= Andrei Finonchenko =

Kazakhstani footballer and coach

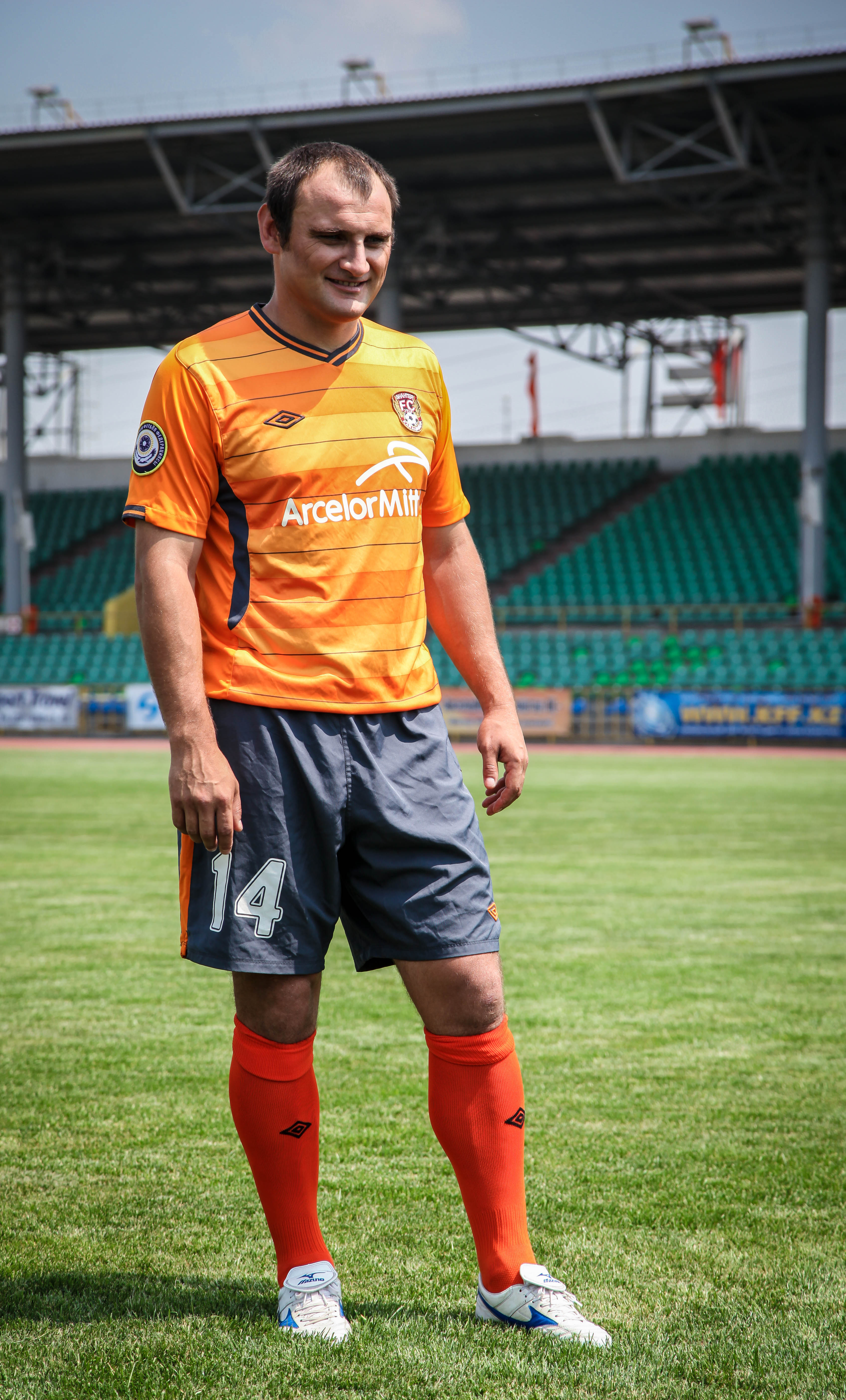
- Finonchenko in 2012

Personal information
- Date of birth: 21 June 1982 (age 44)
- Place of birth: Karagandy, Soviet Union
- Height: 1.79 m (5 ft 10 1/2 in)
- Position: Forward

Team information
- Current team: Shakhter Karagandy (manager)

Senior career*
Years	Team	Apps	(Gls)
2001–2016	Shakhter Karagandy	346	(104)

International career
2003–2014	Kazakhstan	20	(5)

Managerial career
- 2017–2019: Shakhter Karagandy (assistant)
- 2017: Shakhter Karagandy (caretaker)
- 2018: Shakhter Karagandy (caretaker)
- 2019–2020: Shakhter Karagandy (sporting director)
- 2021: Shakhter Karagandy (caretaker)
- 2021–2024: Shakhter Karagandy (assistant)
- 2024–: Shakhter Karagandy
- * Club domestic league appearances and goals

Andrei Finonchenko (Russian: Андрей Финонченко; born 21 June 1982) is a Kazakh football coach and former football striker who spent his whole career with FC Shakhter Karagandy, as well as representing the Kazakhstan national football team. He is the manager of Shakhter Karagandy.

== Career ==
=== Club ===
Born in Karagandy, Finonchenko began his career as a left-back before being converted into a forward.

Finonchenko announced his retirement from football, and his appointment as Shakhter Karagandy new assistant manager on 3 February 2017.

=== International ===
Finonchenko made his international debut on 6 June 2003, against Poland, going on to make 20 appearances for his country, scoring five goals in the process, the first of which came against Cyprus on 19 February 2004.

=== Managerial ===
After Uladzimir Zhuravel's contract terminated by mutual consent on 3 July 2018, with Finonchenko was appointed as Caretaker Manager of Shakhter Karagandy.

On 29 November 2019, Finonchenko was appointed as Sporting Director of Shakhter Karagandy.

== Career statistics ==
=== Club ===
As of match played 19 June 2016

Appearances and goals by club, season and competition
Club	Season	League			National Cup		Continental		Other		Total	
Club	Season	Division	Apps	Goals	Apps	Goals	Apps	Goals	Apps	Goals	Apps	Goals
Shakhter Karagandy	2000	Kazakhstan Premier League	0	0	2	0	-		-		2	0
Shakhter Karagandy	2001	Kazakhstan Premier League	14	0	0	0	-		-		14	0
Shakhter Karagandy	2002	Kazakhstan Premier League	8	0	1	0	-		-		9	0
Shakhter Karagandy	2003	Kazakhstan Premier League	32	18	1	0	-		-		33	18
Shakhter Karagandy	2004	Kazakhstan Premier League	30	8	1	0	-		-		31	8
Shakhter Karagandy	2005	Kazakhstan Premier League	28	11	1	0	-		-		29	11
Shakhter Karagandy	2006	Kazakhstan Premier League	28	16	6	6	2	0	-		36	22
Shakhter Karagandy	2007	Kazakhstan Premier League	26	6	4	2	-		-		30	8
Shakhter Karagandy	2008	Kazakhstan Premier League	18	6	1	5	0	0	-		19	11
Shakhter Karagandy	2009	Kazakhstan Premier League	17	5	7	4	-		-		24	9
Shakhter Karagandy	2010	Kazakhstan Premier League	27	8	5	2	2	0	-		34	10
Shakhter Karagandy	2011	Kazakhstan Premier League	22	8	1	1	3	0	-		26	9
Shakhter Karagandy	2012	Kazakhstan Premier League	20	6	2	1	2	0	1	0	25	7
Shakhter Karagandy	2013	Kazakhstan Premier League	23	6	5	2	11	3	1	0	40	11
Shakhter Karagandy	2014	Kazakhstan Premier League	26	4	3	0	5	2	1	0	35	6
Shakhter Karagandy	2015	Kazakhstan Premier League	12	0	0	0	-		-		12	0
Shakhter Karagandy	2016	Kazakhstan Premier League	15	2	1	0	-		-		16	2
Shakhter Karagandy	Total		346	104	41	23	25	5	3	0	415	132
Career total			346	104	41	23	25	5	3	0	415	132

=== International ===
Kazakhstan national team
Year	Apps	Goals
2003	1	0
2004	2	1
2005	0	0
2006	3	1
2007	4	1
2008	0	0
2009	1	0
2010	2	0
2011	1	0
2012	0	0
2013	4	2
2014	2	0
Total	20	5

Statistics accurate as of match played 7 June 2014

=== International goals ===
As of 12 November 2015

#	Date	Venue	Opponent	Score	Result	Competition	Ref
1.	19 February 2004	Pafiako Stadium, Paphos, Cyprus	Armenia	3–2	3–3	Friendly	
2.	26 December 2006	National Stadium, Bangkok, Thailand	Vietnam	1–1	1–2	Friendly	
3.	9 March 2007	Kazhymukan Munaitpasov Stadium, Shymkent, Kazakhstan	Azerbaijan	1–0	1–0	Friendly	
4.	6 September 2013	Astana Arena, Astana, Kazakhstan	Faroe Islands	2–1	2–1	2014 WC Qualifier	
5.	12 October 2013	Tórsvøllur, Tórshavn, Faroe Islands	Faroe Islands	1–1	1–1	2014 WC Qualifier	

== Honours ==
Shakhter Karagandy

- Kazakhstan Premier League: 2011, 2012
- Kazakhstan Cup: 2013
- Kazakhstan Super Cup: 2013
