= Ivan Perić =

Serbian footballer

Personal information
- Date of birth: 5 May 1982 (age 44)
- Place of birth: Pristina, SFR Yugoslavia
- Height: 1.89 m (6 ft 2 in)
- Position: Striker

Youth career
- FK Zemun

Senior career*
Years	Team	Apps	(Gls)
2002–2003	Obilić	14	(7)
2003–2005	Zemun	16	(6)
2005–2006	Shakhter Karagandy	24	(11)
2006–2007	Arsenal Kyiv	19	(6)
2007	Jeju United	2	(0)
2008–2009	Shakhter Karagandy	45	(22)
2010	Zhetysu	15	(2)
2010	Aktobe	10	(3)
2011–2012	Ordabasy	17	(3)
2012–2013	Taraz	20	(4)
2013–2014	Zhetysu	22	(1)
2014	Mersin İdmanyurdu	4	(0)
2014–2015	Kukës	6	(0)
2015	Brampton United		
- * Club domestic league appearances and goals

Ivan Perić (born 5 May 1982 in Pristina, SFR Yugoslavia) is a Serbian retired footballer.

== Club career ==
Perić began his career in 2002 in the First League of Serbia and Montenegro with FK Obilić later with FK Zemun. In 2005, he played abroad in the Kazakhstan Premier League with FC Shakhter Karagandy. After a season in Asia he played in the Ukrainian Premier League with Arsenal Kyiv. The following season he played in the K League 1 with Jeju United FC, and later returned to Shakhter Karagandy in 2008. During his second tenure with Shakhter he featured in the 2008–09 UEFA Cup against Debreceni VSC.

In 2010, he played with FC Zhetysu, and later with FC Aktobe. Throughout his time with Aktobe he played in the 2010–11 UEFA Champions League against Hapoel Tel Aviv, and Olimpi Rustavi. He also participated in the 2010–11 UEFA Europa League against AZ Alkmaar. In 2011, he played with FC Ordabasy, and in 2013 returned to Zhetysu. In 2014, he played in the TFF First League with Mersin İdman Yurdu.

On 18 June 2014, Perić moved to Albania where he signed with Kukësi on a one-year deal. Kukësi beat the concurrence of Albanian champions Skënderbeu Korçë who wanted to purchase the player after the departure of fellow Croatian striker Pero Pejić. He made his unofficial debut with the team against Macedonian side Metalurg Skopje, where he and Sokol Cikalleshi scored the goals of the 2–0 win. He played in the 2014–15 UEFA Europa League against FC Kairat. In 2015, he played in the Canadian Soccer League with Brampton United.
