= Moses Sakyi =

Ghanaian footballer

Personal information
- Date of birth: 12 March 1981 (age 45)
- Place of birth: Accra, Ghana
- Height: 1.88 m (6 ft 2 in)
- Position: Centre-forward

Youth career
- Iron Breakers

Senior career*
Years	Team	Apps	(Gls)
1999–2000	Liberty Professionals		
2000–2001	FC St. Pauli	0	(0)
2002	Yozgatspor	7	(0)
2002–2003	CSKA Sofia	0	(0)
2003	Slavia Sofia	12	(0)
2004	İstanbulspor	8	(0)
2005	Estoril	28	(2)
2006	Olhanense	14	(4)
2006–2007	Estrela Amadora	24	(3)
2008	AEL Limassol	6	(0)
2008–2009	Olhanense	9	(1)
2009	Hangzhou Greentown	6	(0)
2009–2010	Gondomar	15	(4)
2010	Akzhayik	28	(14)
2010–2011	Al Ain	0	(0)
2011	Pinhalnovense	9	(0)
2012	Persib Bandung	9	(3)
2014–2015	Moura	19	(4)
2015–2016	Rio Maior	4	(2)
Total		198	(37)

International career
2004–2007	Ghana	2	(0)
- * Club domestic league appearances and goals

Moses Sakyi (born 12 March 1981) is a Ghanaian former professional footballer who played as a centre-forward.

== Club career ==
Born in Accra, Sakyi made his senior debut with Liberty Professionals FC, where he shared teams with future Chelsea player Michael Essien. He went on to compete professionally in a host of countries, representing Yozgatspor, İstanbulspor (Turkey), PFC Slavia Sofia (Bulgaria), G.D. Estoril Praia, S.C. Olhanense and C.F. Estrela da Amadora (Portugal).

From January 2008 to 2012, other than in Portugal's Segunda Liga, Sakyi played at the professional level in the Cypriot First Division, the Chinese Super League, the Kazakhstan Premier League and the Indonesia Super League. On 21 June 2013, he was supposed to sign with C.D. Tondela, but nothing came of it, and he met the same fate with SC Mirandela. After two years out of football he joined another Portuguese club, Moura AC.

== International career ==
Sakyi won the first of his two caps for Ghana on 14 June 2004, in a 0–0 friendly against Togo.
