= Saša Đorđević (footballer) =

Serbian footballer (1981–2025)

Personal information
- Date of birth: 4 August 1981
- Place of birth: Kraljevo, SR Serbia, SFR Yugoslavia
- Date of death: 14 November 2025 (aged 44)
- Height: 1.86 m (6 ft 1 in)
- Position: Right-back

Senior career*
Years	Team	Apps	(Gls)
2001–2004	Bane	79	(13)
2004–2006	Rad	41	(1)
2006–2007	Željezničar Sarajevo	3	(0)
2007–2008	Rad	23	(0)
2008–2010	Shakhter Karagandy	78	(3)
2011	Bunyodkor	8	(0)
- * Club domestic league appearances and goals

Saša Đorđević (Serbian Cyrillic: Саша Ђорђевић; 4 August 1981 – 14 November 2025) was a Serbian professional footballer who played as a right-back for FK Bane, FK Rad in his domestic league and for Bosnia and Herzegovina side FK Željezničar Sarajevo. Đorđević died on 14 November 2025, at the age of 44.
