= Sergei Kozyulin =

Kazakhstani footballer

Sergey Kozulin
Personal information
- Full name: Sergey Kozulin
- Date of birth: 9 September 1980 (age 46)
- Place of birth: Soviet Union
- Height: 1.83 m (6 ft 0 in)
- Position: Defender

Senior career*
Years	Team	Apps	(Gls)
1996–1998	Taraz	25	(0)
1999	Sintez	27	(0)
2000	Dostyk Shymkent	12	(0)
2000–2003	Zhenis	79	(3)
2004–2005	Ordabasy	48	(1)
2006	Taraz	22	(0)
2007–2010	Ordabasy	80	(2)
2010	Shakhter Karagandy	9	(0)
2011	Tarlan	29	(2)
2012–2015	Kyran	98	(3)
Total		429	(11)

International career
2000–2004	Kazakhstan	6	(0)
- * Club domestic league appearances and goals

Sergei Kozulin (born 9 September 1980) is a retired Kazakhstani International footballer who played as a defender.
