= Serhiy Sarana =

Ukrainian footballer

Personal information
- Date of birth: 7 December 1978 (age 47)
- Place of birth: Lozova, Kharkiv Oblast, Ukrainian SSR
- Height: 1.86 m (6 ft 1 in)
- Position: Goalkeeper

Senior career*
Years	Team	Apps	(Gls)
1997–1998	FC Metalist Kharkiv	2	(0)
1997–1998	→ FC Metalist-2 Kharkiv	31	(0)
2001–2003	FC Arsenal Kharkiv	64	(0)
2004	FC Atyrau	18	(0)
2005–2010	FC Shakhter Karagandy	9	(0)
2011	FC Akzhayik	15	(0)
2015	FC Start Chuhuiv	4	(0)
2016	FC Druzhba Kharkiv	8	(0)
2017–2018	FC Kvadro Pervomaiskyi	16	(0)

Managerial career
- 2013–2015: FC Helios Kharkiv (assistant)
- 2016: FC Metalist Kharkiv (assistant)
- * Club domestic league appearances and goals

Serhiy Sarana (born 7 December 1978) is a professional footballer. He made his professional debut in the Ukrainian Premier League in 1996 for FC Metalist Kharkiv. He was a main goalie for Arsenal Kharkiv in the beginning of the 2000s. In 2004, he moved to Kazakhstan. After a brief stint at FC Atyrau he moved to Karaganda club FC Shakhter.

== Honours ==
- Kazakhstan Premier League bronze: 2007.
