= Alyaksey Suchkow =

Belarusian retired football midfielder (born 1981)

Personal information
- Date of birth: 10 June 1981 (age 45)
- Place of birth: Lida, Belarusian SSR
- Height: 1.87 m (6 ft 2 in)
- Position: Midfielder

Youth career
- 1997–2000: Neman-Belcard Grodno

Senior career*
Years	Team	Apps	(Gls)
1997–1999	Neman-2 Grodno	38	(2)
1999–2002	Neman-Belcard Grodno	47	(3)
2000	→ Neman Mosty (loan)	29	(7)
2003–2007	Karpaty Lviv	106	(5)
2003	→ Karpaty-2 Lviv	1	(0)
2004	→ Shinnik Yaroslavl (loan)	2	(0)
2008–2009	Kharkiv	27	(0)
2009	Shakhtyor Soligorsk	12	(2)
2009	Neman Grodno	12	(2)
2010	Shakhter Karagandy	30	(3)
2011–2012	Neman Grodno	46	(0)
2013	Torpedo-BelAZ Zhodino	22	(2)
2014–2017	Naftan Novopolotsk	101	(8)

International career
2002–2004	Belarus U21	15	(0)
2004–2006	Belarus	5	(0)

Managerial career
- 2019: Naftan Novopolotsk (assistant)
- * Club domestic league appearances and goals

Alyaksey Suchkow (Belarusian: Аляксей Сучкоў; Russian: Алексей Сучков; born 10 June 1981) is a Belarusian retired football midfielder.

In July 2020 Suchkow was found guilty of being involved in a match-fixing schema in Belarusian football. He was sentenced to 1 year of house arrest and banned from Belarusian football for life.
