= Anatoly Bogdanov (footballer) =

Russian-Kazakhstani footballer

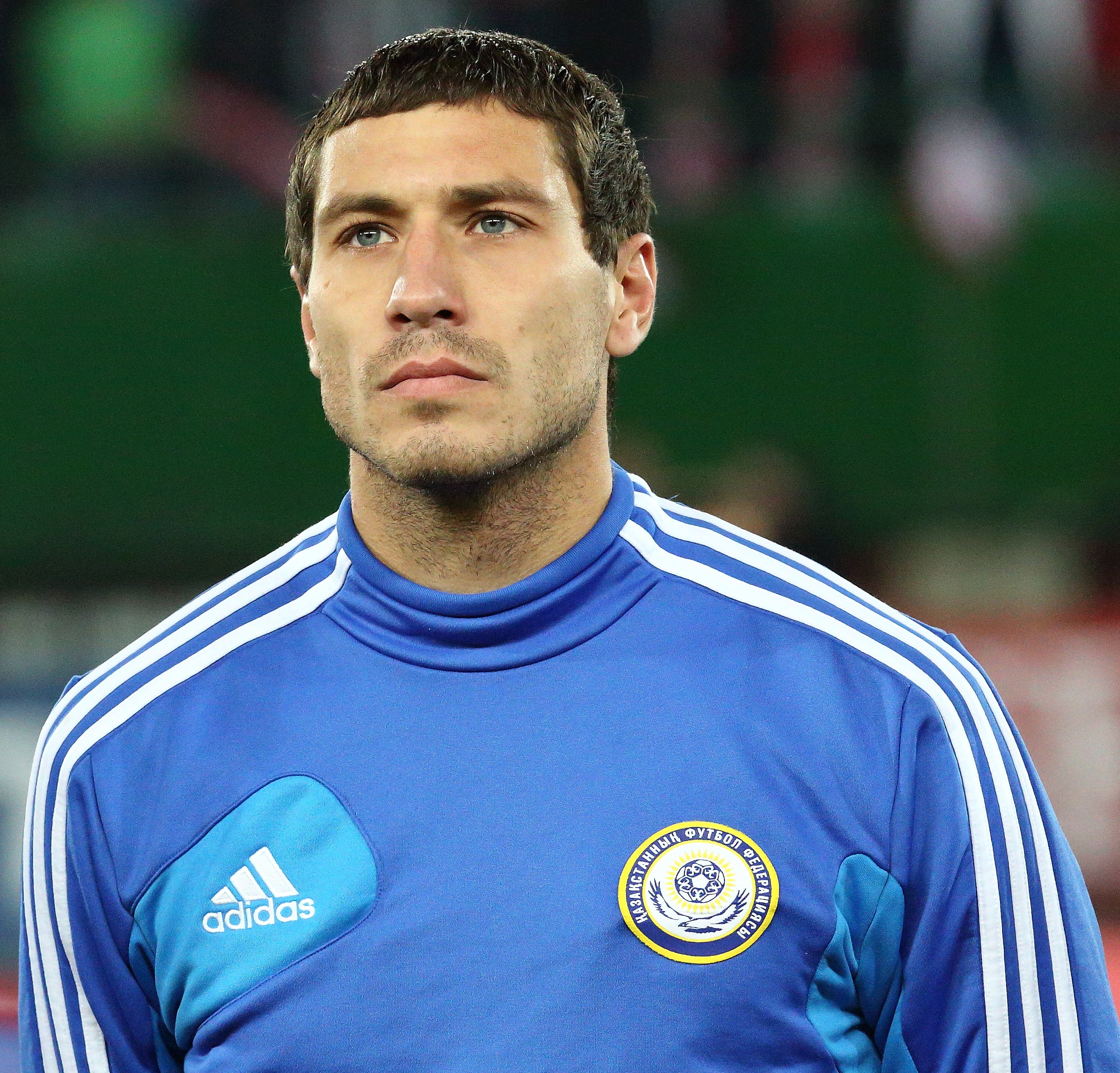

Personal information
- Full name: Anatoly Valentinovich Bogdanov
- Date of birth: 7 June 1981 (age 45)
- Place of birth: Leningrad, Russian SFSR, Soviet Union
- Height: 1.86 m (6 ft 1 in)
- Position: Midfielder

Senior career*
Years	Team	Apps	(Gls)
2003–2004	Okzhetpes	49	(1)
2005	Aktobe-Lento	21	(0)
2006	Okzhetpes	24	(0)
2007–2008	Vostok	44	(1)
2009–2010	Shakhter Karagandy	54	(1)
2011–2015	Tobol	118	(14)
2016	Okzhetpes	4	(0)
2017	STD Petrovich		
2018	LAZ		
2019	Dynamo St. Petersburg		

International career
2012–2015	Kazakhstan	14	(0)

Managerial career
- 2020–2021: FC Dynamo St. Petersburg
- * Club domestic league appearances and goals

Anatoly Valentinovich Bogdanov (Russian: Анатолий Валентинович Богданов; born 7 June 1981) is a Russian-Kazakhstani professional football coach and a former player, who played as a midfielder.

== Career ==
=== Club ===
In January 2016, Bogdanov signed returned to FC Okzhetpes for a third stint at the club. He left the club at the end of the year and returned to Saint Petersburg, where he played for amateur teams STD Petrovich (2017), LAZ St. Petersburg (2018) and Dynamo St. Petersburg (2019).

=== International ===
Bogdanov made his first appearance for the Kazakhstan national team in 2012.

== Career statistics ==
=== International ===
Kazakhstan
Year	Apps	Goals
2012	4	0
2013	4	0
2014	5	0
2015	1	0
Total	14	0

Statistics accurate as of match played 18 February 2014
