= Igor Shatsky =

Kazakhstani footballer

Personal information
- Full name: Igor Valeryevich Shatsky
- Date of birth: 11 May 1989 (age 37)
- Place of birth: Karaganda, Kazakh SSR, Soviet Union
- Height: 1.85 m (6 ft 1 in)
- Position: Goalkeeper

Team information
- Current team: Shakhter Karagandy
- Number: 30

Youth career
- –2007: Shakhter Karagandy

Senior career*
Years	Team	Apps	(Gls)
2008–2011	Shakhter Karagandy	0	(0)
2012–2013	Astana-1964	53	(0)
2014–2015	Bolat	22	(0)
2015–2019	Shakhter Karagandy	106	(0)
2020–2021	Tobol	6	(0)
2021–2023	Shakhter Karagandy	60	(0)
2024	Aktobe	24	(0)
2025–	Shakhter Karagandy	35	(0)

International career^{‡}
2019–	Kazakhstan	33	(0)
- * Club domestic league appearances and goals as of 2 November 2026 ‡ National team caps and goals as of 13 October 2024

Igor Valeryevich Shatsky (Russian: Игорь Валерьевич Шацкий; born 11 May 1989) is a Kazakhstani footballer who plays as a goalkeeper for Shakhter Karagandy and the Kazakhstan national team.

== Career ==
=== Club ===
On 5 January 2020, FC Tobol announced the signing of Shatsky on a contract until the end of 2020.

On 6 December 2024, Aktobe announced the departure of Shatsky, with the goalkeeper returning to Shakhter Karagandy.

=== International ===
Shatsky made his international debut for Kazakhstan on 21 February 2019, coming on as a half-time substitute for Dmytro Nepohodov in a friendly match against Moldova, which finished as a 1–0 win.

== Career statistics ==
=== International ===
As of 13 October 2024

Kazakhstan
Year	Apps	Goals
2019	1	0
2020	0	0
2021	4	0
2022	10	0
2023	10	0
2024	8	0
Total	33	0
