= Shakhter Stadium, Karaganda =

Multi-use stadium in Karaganda, Kazakhstan

Coordinates: 49°49′07″N 73°04′30″E

Shakhtyor Stadium
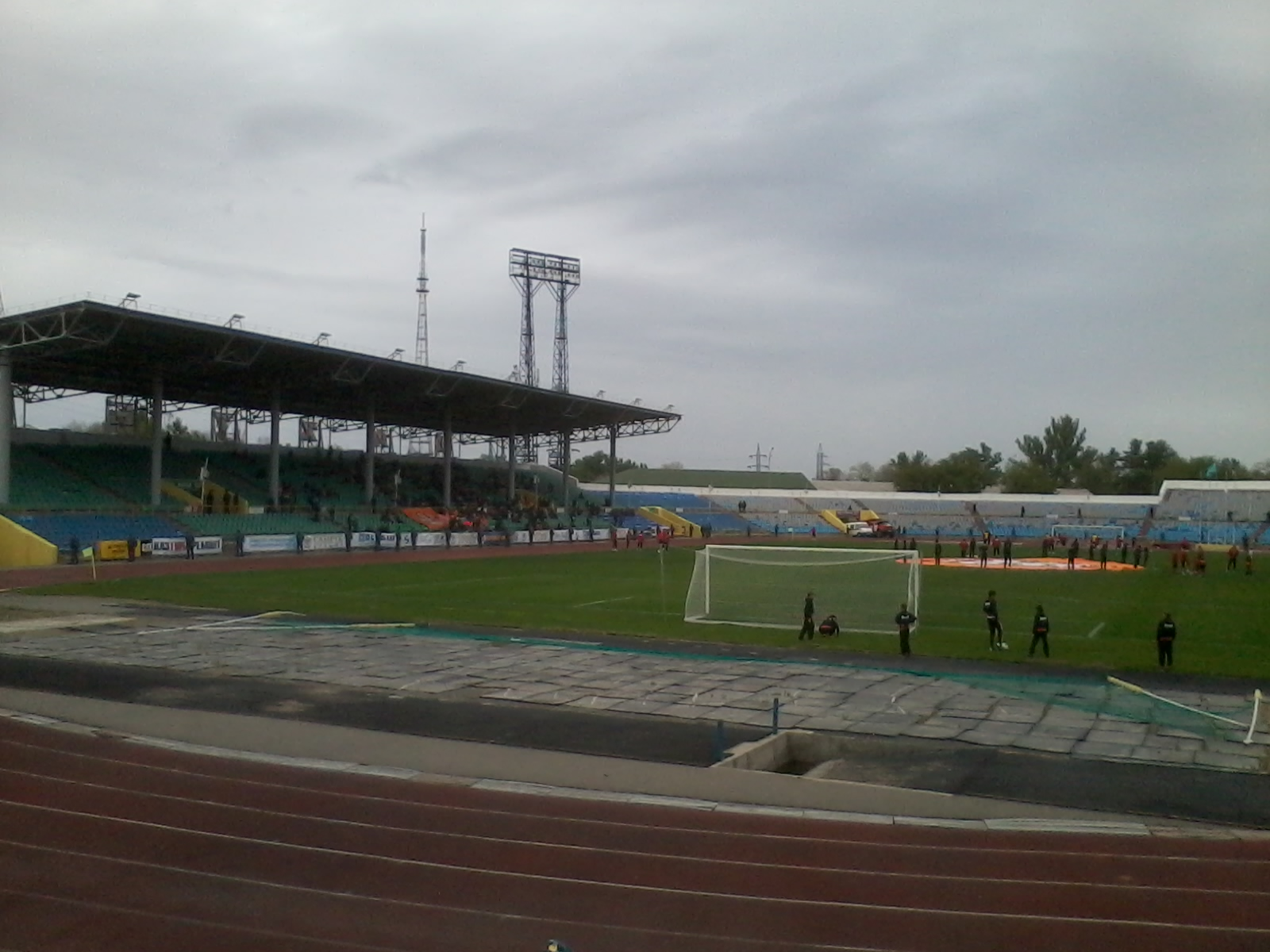
- Interactive map of Shakhtyor Stadium
- Location: Karaganda, Kazakhstan
- Owner: Municipality of Karaganda
- Capacity: 19,000
- Surface: Grass; 104m x 72m
- Record attendance: 18,800 Shakhter Karagandy-BATE Borisov, 23 July 2013

Construction
- Opened: 1958
- Renovated: 2001, 2006

Tenants
- FC Jenis, FC Shakhter

Shakhtyor Stadium (Kazakh: Шахтёр стадионы, Shahtıor stadıony) is a multi-use stadium in Karaganda, Kazakhstan. It is currently used mostly for football matches and is the home stadium of FC Jenis and FC Shakhter.
