= 2012 FC Astana season =

FC Astana
2012 season
- Chairman: Kaisar Bekenov
- Manager: Oleh Protasov (until 27 April 2012); Miroslav Beránek (from 4 May 2012)
- Stadium: Astana Arena
- Premier League: 5th
- Kazakhstan Cup: Winners
- Top goalscorer: League: Tanat Nusserbayev (10); All: Tanat Nusserbayev (11)
- Highest home attendance: 8,000 vs Irtysh Pavlodar (8 April 2012)
- Lowest home attendance: 500 vs Ak Bulak (27 June 2012)
- Average home league attendance: 5,169 (11 November 2012)
Home colours	Away colours	Third colours

The 2012 FC Astana season was the fourth successive season that Astana played in the Kazakhstan Premier League, the highest tier of association football in Kazakhstan. They finished the season in 5th place whilst also winning the Kazakhstan Cup, and as a result qualified for the Europa League for the first time.

Astana started the season under the management of Oleh Protasov, who had replaced Holger Fach at the end of the 2011 season. Protasov left in April, with Miroslav Beránek taking over as manager in May.

== Squad ==
As of match played 11 November 2012

No.	Name	Nationality	Position	Date of birth (age)	Signed from	Signed in	Apps.	Goals
Goalkeepers
1	Nenad Erić	(Serbia)	GK	26 May 1982 (aged 30)	Kairat	2011	62	0
24	Denis Tolebaev	(Kazakhstan)	GK	7 February 1987 (aged 25)	Vostok	2012	0	0
55	Aleksei Belkin	(Russia)	GK	25 November 1981 (aged 30)	Volga Tver	2010	19	0
77	Aleksandr Konochkin	(Kazakhstan)	GK	20 January 1994 (aged 18)	Academy	2011	0	0
78	Rimas Martinkus	(Kazakhstan)	GK	13 January 1993 (aged 19)	Academy	2011	0	0
93	Denis Ovsyannikov	(Kazakhstan)	GK	13 March 1995 (aged 17)	Academy	2012	0	0
95	Aleksandr Sidorov	(Kazakhstan)	GK	13 March 1995 (aged 17)	Academy	2011	0	0
Defenders
6	Kairat Nurdauletov	(Kazakhstan)	DF	6 November 1982 (aged 30)	Tobol	2010	79	4
8	Viktor Dmitrenko	(Kazakhstan)	DF	4 April 1991 (aged 21)	Kuban Krasnodar	2012	24	2
16	Yevgeni Goryachi	(Kazakhstan)	DF	4 April 1991 (aged 21)	Kairat	2012	5	0
18	Nurtas Kurgulin	(Kazakhstan)	DF	20 September 1986 (aged 26)	Taraz	2012	0	0
27	Mikhail Rozhkov	(Kazakhstan)	DF	27 December 1983 (aged 28)	Rostov	2010	97	10
29	Dimitrija Lazarevski	(North Macedonia)	DF	23 September 1982 (aged 30)	Rabotnički	2012	31	0
30	Radmir Moksinov	(Kazakhstan)	DF	9 November 1991 (aged 21)	Academy	2011	0	0
35	Zhanat Zakirov	(Kazakhstan)	DF	22 September 1992 (aged 20)	Academy	2010	0	0
44	Pavel Khalezov	(Kazakhstan)	DF	10 August 1994 (aged 18)	Academy	2010	0	0
50	Darkhan Kosherbaev	(Kazakhstan)	DF	28 October 1993 (aged 19)	Academy	2010	0	0
58	Erbol Musabaev	(Kazakhstan)	DF	2 March 1992 (aged 20)	Academy	2010	0	0
Midfielders
3	Valeri Korobkin	(Kazakhstan)	MF	2 July 1984 (aged 28)	Yenisey Krasnoyarsk	2012	20	0
7	Ulan Konysbayev	(Kazakhstan)	MF	28 May 1989 (aged 23)	Taraz	2011	43	3
15	Abzal Beisebekov	(Kazakhstan)	MF	30 November 1992 (aged 19)	Vostok	2012	31	1
19	Christian Ebala	(Cameroon)	MF	17 March 1988 (aged 24)	loan from Kecskeméti	2012	18	0
20	Foxi Kéthévoama	(Central African Republic)	MF	30 May 1986 (aged 26)	loan from Kecskeméti	2012	29	3
22	Marat Shakhmetov	(Kazakhstan)	MF	6 February 1989 (aged 23)	Alma-Ata	2009	107	5
23	Serik Zaynalov	(Kazakhstan)	MF	29 January 1992 (aged 20)	Academy	2010	0	0
32	Azat Smagulov	(Kazakhstan)	MF	31 July 1992 (aged 20)	Academy	2010	0	0
33	Eduard Tromenshleger	(Kazakhstan)	MF	19 March 1994 (aged 18)	Academy	2010	0	0
45	Maksim Shaubert	(Kazakhstan)	MF	24 October 1992 (aged 20)	Academy	2011	0	0
48	Zhumazhan Musabekov	(Kazakhstan)	MF	4 December 1992 (aged 19)	Academy	2010	0	0
49	Kirill Sazonov	(Kazakhstan)	MF	25 February 1993 (aged 19)	Academy	2012	0	0
52	Ilya Beruashvili	(Kazakhstan)	MF	24 July 1994 (aged 18)	Academy	2012	0	0
66	Bauyrzhan Seisenbekov	(Kazakhstan)	MF	24 May 1989 (aged 23)	Academy	2011	0	0
88	Rinat Khairullin	(Kazakhstan)	MF	19 December 1994 (aged 17)	Academy	2011	0	0
90	Damir Kojašević	(Montenegro)	MF	3 June 1987 (aged 25)	loan from Budućnost Podgorica	2012	16	4
91	Arsen Inkarbekov	(Kazakhstan)	MF	27 February 1991 (aged 21)	Academy	2010	0	0
99	Baikonyr Idrisov	(Kazakhstan)	MF	12 April 1991 (aged 21)	Academy	2010	0	0
Forwards
9	Sergei Ostapenko	(Kazakhstan)	FW	23 February 1986 (aged 26)	Zhetysu	2012	65	13
17	Tanat Nusserbayev	(Kazakhstan)	FW	1 January 1987 (aged 25)	Ordabasy	2011	58	18
21	Yerzhan Mukhamedin	(Kazakhstan)	FW	2 September 1990 (aged 22)	Academy	2010	0	0
28	Filip Ivanovski	(North Macedonia)	FW	1 May 1985 (aged 27)	Vardar	2012	16	1
34	Timur Bakhriden	(Kazakhstan)	FW	23 February 1994 (aged 18)	Academy	2011	0	0
37	Jaba Jamarishvili	(Kazakhstan)	FW	18 August 1992 (aged 20)	Academy	2010	0	0
40	Denis Prokopenko	(Kazakhstan)	FW	5 October 1991 (aged 21)	Academy	2010	7	1
69	Bimukhamed Bukeev	(Kazakhstan)	FW	2 July 1993 (aged 19)	Academy	2011	0	0
79	Igor Popadinets	(Kazakhstan)	FW	28 February 1994 (aged 18)	Academy	2010	0	0
Players away on loan
5	Piraliy Aliev	(Kazakhstan)	DF	13 January 1984 (aged 28)	Atyrau	2011	38	1
11	Sergey Gridin	(Kazakhstan)	FW	20 May 1987 (aged 25)	Tobol	2012	15	3
	Islambek Kuat	(Kazakhstan)	MF	12 January 1993 (aged 19)	Academy	2010	0	0
Players that left during the season
4	Mukhtar Mukhtarov	(Kazakhstan)	DF	13 January 1984 (aged 28)	Ordabasy	2012	13	1
10	Emil Dică	(Romania)	MF	17 July 1982 (aged 30)	Xanthi	2012	8	1
31	Dušan Petronijević	(Serbia)	MF	9 November 1983 (aged 29)	Shakhter Karagandy	2012	12	0
43	Ivan Navrotsky	(Kazakhstan)	DF	2 March 1992 (aged 20)	Academy	2010	0	0
47	Dmitry Kaminsky	(Kazakhstan)	DF	10 March 1993 (aged 19)	Academy	2012	0	0

== Transfers ==
=== Winter ===
In: Note: Flags indicate national team as defined under FIFA eligibility rules; some limited exceptions apply. Players may hold more than one non-FIFA nationality.

No.	Pos.	Nation	Player
4	DF	KAZ	Mukhtar Mukhtarov (from (Kazakhstan) Ordabasy)
7	MF	KAZ	Ulan Konysbayev (from (Kazakhstan) Shakhter Karagandy)
8	DF	KAZ	Viktor Dmitrenko (from (Russia) Kuban Krasnodar)
9	FW	KAZ	Sergei Ostapenko (from (Kazakhstan) Zhetysu)
10	MF	ROU	Emil Dică (from (Greece) Skoda Xanthi)
15	MF	KAZ	Abzal Beisebekov (from (Kazakhstan) Vostok)
16	DF	KAZ	Yevgeni Goryachi (from (Kazakhstan) Kairat)
18	DF	KAZ	Nurtas Kurgulin (from (Kazakhstan) Taraz)
19	MF	CMR	Christian Ebala (loan from (Hungary) Kecskeméti)
20	MF	CAF	Foxi Kéthévoama (loan from (Hungary) Kecskeméti)
24	GK	KAZ	Denis Tolebaev (from (Kazakhstan) Vostok)
31	MF	SRB	Dušan Petronijević (from (Kazakhstan) Shakhter Karagandy)

Out: Note: Flags indicate national team as defined under FIFA eligibility rules; some limited exceptions apply. Players may hold more than one non-FIFA nationality.

No.	Pos.	Nation	Player
4	DF	KAZ	Maksim Zhalmagambetov (to (Kazakhstan) Ordabasy)
7	FW	MDA	Anatolie Doroș (to (Azerbaijan) Simurq)
8	MF	KAZ	Andrei Karpovich (to (Kazakhstan) Ordabasy)
9	FW	KAZ	Nurbol Zhumaskaliyev (to (Kazakhstan) Tobol)
10	FW	MDA	Igor Bugaiov (to (Kazakhstan) Tobol)
11	FW	MNE	Dragan Bogavac (to (Serbia) OFK Beograd)
13	FW	SRB	Danilo Belić (loan to (Kazakhstan) Zhetysu, previously on loan to (Kazakhstan) Taraz)
15	MF	MKD	Bobi Božinovski (to (North Macedonia) Teteks)
18	MF	KAZ	Maksim Azovskiy (to (Kazakhstan) Akzhayik)
19	DF	KAZ	Mark Gorman (to (Kazakhstan) Kairat)
—	MF	KAZ	Islambek Kuat (loan to (Kazakhstan) Aktobe)

=== Summer ===
In: Note: Flags indicate national team as defined under FIFA eligibility rules; some limited exceptions apply. Players may hold more than one non-FIFA nationality.

No.	Pos.	Nation	Player
3	MF	KAZ	Valeri Korobkin (from (Russia) Yenisey Krasnoyarsk)
28	FW	MKD	Filip Ivanovski (from (North Macedonia) Vardar)
29	DF	MKD	Dimitrija Lazarevski (from (North Macedonia) Rabotnički)
90	MF	MNE	Damir Kojašević (from (Montenegro) Budućnost Podgorica)

Out: Note: Flags indicate national team as defined under FIFA eligibility rules; some limited exceptions apply. Players may hold more than one non-FIFA nationality.

No.	Pos.	Nation	Player
4	DF	KAZ	Mukhtar Mukhtarov (to (Kazakhstan) Ordabasy)
5	DF	KAZ	Piraliy Aliev (loan to (Kazakhstan) Tobol)
10	MF	ROU	Emil Dică (to (Romania) Mioveni)
31	MF	SRB	Dušan Petronijević (to (Serbia) Radnički 1923)
43	DF	KAZ	Ivan Navrotsky
47	DF	KAZ	Dmitry Kaminsky

== Competitions ==
=== Premier League ===
==== Results summary ====
Overall								Home						Away					
Pld	W	D	L	GF	GA	GD	Pts	W	D	L	GF	GA	GD	W	D	L	GF	GA	GD
26	13	7	6	34	24	+10	46	8	3	2	20	11	+9	5	4	4	14	13	+1

Last updated: 10 July 2014.
Source: Soccerway

==== Results by round ====
Round	1	2	3	4	5	6	7	8	9	10	11	12	13	14	15	16	17	18	19	20	21	22	23	24	25	26
Ground	H	H	A	H	A	H	A	H	H	A	H	A	H	A	H	A	H	A	H	A	A	H	A	H	A	A
Result	L	W	W	D	L	L	L	W	D	W	W	D	W	W	W	L	D	W	W	W	D	W	L	W	D	D
Position	10	11	8	7	7	8	9	11	9	9	9	7	8	8	7	4	5	6	4	4	4	4	4	5	5	5

Source: Soccerway
A = Away; H = Home; W = Win; D = Draw; L = Loss

==== Results ====
10 March 2012 1	Astana	0 – 2	Taraz	Astana
17:00 (UTC+6)	Ostapenko (yellow card) 23'; Gridin (yellow card) 86'	Report	Perić (yellow card) 16' (goal) 62'; Vukman (yellow card) 56'; Diakate (yellow card) 60'; A.Shabaev (yellow card) 87'; Prtenjak 90+2' (yellow card) 90+3'	Stadium: Astana Arena; Attendance: 5,000; Referee: Artyom Kuchin

25 March 2012 2	Astana	2 – 1	Akzhayik	Astana
15:00 (UTC+6)	Nurdauletov 38' (pen.); Nusserbayev 52'; Dică (yellow card) 86'	Report	Zyankovich 6'; Sadjo (yellow card) 72'; A.Maltsev (yellow card) 87'	Stadium: Astana Arena; Attendance: 3,500; Referee: Igor Khisamutdinov

1 April 2012 3	Kairat	0 – 2	Astana	Almaty
17:00 (UTC+6)	Shestakov (yellow card) 14'; Y.Levin (yellow card) 35'	Report	Konysbayev (yellow card) 41'; Mukhtarov (yellow card) 45+1'; Gridin 63'; Ostapenko 73'	Stadium: Central Stadium; Attendance: 7,000; Referee: Pavel Saliy

8 April 2012 4	Astana	2 – 2	Irtysh Pavlodar	Astana
17:00 (UTC+6)	Ebala (yellow card) 25'; Nusserbayev 78'; Rozhkov 89'	Report	Yurin 13', 74'; Bakayev (yellow card) 55'	Stadium: Astana Arena; Attendance: 8,000; Referee: Kairat Slambekov

15 April 2012 5	Tobol	3 – 2	Astana	Kostanay
15:00 (UTC+6)	Dzholchiev (yellow card) 28' (goal) 45+1'; Kostyuk 55'; Bogdanov 63' (yellow card) 71'; Golovskoy (yellow card) 82'; Jhonnes (yellow card) 88'; Volkov (yellow card) 90'	Report	Nusserbayev 7' (yellow card) 88'; Kéthévoama 11'	Stadium: Central Stadium; Attendance: 4,000; Referee: Viktor Antonov

22 April 2012 6	Astana	1 – 4	Okzhetpes	Astana
(UTC+6)	Dică 7' (pen.)	Report	Yankep (yellow card) 6'; A.Makhambetov (yellow card) 40'; D.Chagelishvili 51', 87', 90'; Dică 90' (o.g.)	Stadium: Astana Arena; Attendance: 3,500; Referee: Aleksei Bobrov

29 April 2012 7	Atyrau	1 – 0	Astana	Atyrau
18:00 (UTC+6)	Rodionov 15' (yellow card) 87'	Report	Mukhtarov (yellow card) 22' (yellow-red card) 90'	Stadium: Munaishy Stadium; Attendance: 2,500; Referee: Igor Khisamutdinov

6 May 2012 8	Astana	1 – 0	Shakhter Karagandy	Astana
15:00 (UTC+6)	Rozhkov 12'; Dmitrenko (yellow card) 56'	Report	Đidić (yellow card) 12'; Finonchenko (yellow card) 37'	Stadium: Astana Arena; Attendance: 6,000; Referee: Aydin Rakhimbayev

12 May 2012 9	Astana	0 – 0	Sunkar	Astana
17:00 (UTC+6)		Report	Nohýnek (yellow card) 43'; Rodríguez (yellow card) 75'	Stadium: Astana Arena; Attendance: 4,000; Referee: Anatolyi Vishnichenko

20 May 2012 10	Kaisar	0 – 1	Astana	Kyzylorda
16:00 (UTC+6)	A.Baltaev (yellow card) 90'	Report	Dmitrenko 78' (yellow card) 90'; Lazarevski (yellow card) 82'	Stadium: Gany Muratbayev Stadium; Attendance: 5,000; Referee: Sergey Gorokhovodatskiy

27 May 2012 11	Astana	1 – 0	Aktobe	Astana
15:00 (UTC+6)	Ostapenko 52' (yellow card) 63'	Report		Stadium: Astana Arena; Attendance: 6,000; Referee: Viktor Antonov

16 June 2012 12	Zhetysu	1 – 1	Astana	Taldykorgan
19:00 (UTC+6)	Đalović 38'	Report	Rozhkov 78'	Stadium: Zhetysu Stadium; Attendance: 2,000; Referee: Akmalkhan Kholmatov

24 June 2012 13	Astana	1 – 0	Ordabasy	Astana
17:00 (UTC+6)	Nurdauletov (yellow card) 23'; Konysbayev (yellow card) 63'; Gridin 90+1'	Report	Karpovich (yellow card) 4'; Collins (yellow card) 23'; Trajković (yellow card) 24'; B.Kozhabayev (yellow card) 74'	Stadium: Astana Arena; Attendance: 5,200; Referee: Kairat Slambekov

1 July 2012 14	Akzhayik	0 – 1	Astana	Oral
20:00 (UTC+6)	R.Khairov (yellow card) 74'	Report	Konysbayev 5' (yellow card) 86'	Stadium: Petr Atoyan Stadium; Attendance: 7,500; Referee: Anatolyi Vishnichenko

8 July 2012 15	Astana	2 – 1	Kairat	Astana
17:00 (UTC+6)	Nusserbayev 53'; Ostapenko 61' (pen.)	Report	R.Nurmukhametov (yellow card) 60'; A.Abdramanov 72'; Gorman (yellow card) 76'; Shestakov (yellow card) 88'	Stadium: Astana Arena; Attendance: 3,000; Referee: Igor Khisamutdinov

15 July 2012 16	Irtysh Pavlodar	3 – 0	Astana	Pavlodar
19:00 (UTC+6)	Ivanov 33'; Bakayev 50'; Essomba 62'; Mirchev (yellow card) 75'	Report	Korobkin (yellow card) 41'; Nurdauletov (yellow card) 59'	Stadium: Central Stadium; Attendance: 5,200; Referee: Aydin Rakhimbayev

29 July 2012 17	Astana	1 – 1	Tobol	Astana
17:00 (UTC+6)	Konysbayev 40'; Shakhmetov (yellow card) 43'	Report	Zhumaskaliyev 38'; Volkov (yellow card) 58'; Jovanović (yellow card) 90+3'	Stadium: Astana Arena; Attendance: 4,500; Referee: Igor Aleshin

5 August 2012 18	Okzhetpes	1 – 3	Astana	Kokshetau
18:00 (UTC+6)	A.Grigoruţă 7'; I.Chuchman (yellow card) 81'	Report	Nusserbayev 20'; Rozhkov 67'; Kéthévoama (yellow card) 71'; Kojašević 90'	Stadium: Okzhetpes Stadium; Attendance: 3,000; Referee: Akmalkhan Kholmatov

19 August 2012 19	Astana	5 – 0	Atyrau	Astana
17:00 (UTC+6)	Dmitrenko 12' (yellow card) 86'; Korobkin (yellow card) 40'; Ostapenko 45+2'; Kojašević 54'; Konysbayev 78'; Shakhmetov 90+1'	Report	V.Chureev (yellow card) 24'; Khokhlov (yellow card) 30'; Kutsov (yellow card) 86'	Stadium: Astana Arena; Attendance: 3,000; Referee: Ruslan Duzmambetov

26 August 2012 20	Shakhter Karagandy	0 – 1	Astana	Karagandy
18:00 (UTC+6)	A.Makhambetov (yellow card) 41'; Gridin (yellow card) 55'; Paryvayew (yellow card) 62'; V.Li (yellow card) 73'	Report	Rozhkov (yellow card) 49'; Nusserbayev 67'; Ivanovski (yellow card) 86'; Kéthévoama (yellow card) 90+2'	Stadium: Shakhter Stadium; Attendance: 8,000; Referee: Kairat Slambekov

15 September 2012 21	Sunkar	1 – 1	Astana	Almaty
17:00 (UTC+6)	Nurgaliev 36'; O.Nedashkovskiy (yellow card) 61'	Report	Nusserbayev 40'; Rozhkov (yellow card) 66'	Stadium: Almaty Central Stadium; Attendance: 700; Referee: Akmalkhan Kholmatov

23 September 2012 22	Astana	3 – 0	Kaisar	Astana
17:00 (UTC+6)	Ostapenko (yellow card) 53' (goal) 59'; Nusserbayev 60'; Ivanovski 77'	Report	Marković (yellow card) 85'	Stadium: Astana Arena; Attendance: 4,000; Referee: Pavel Saliy

4 October 2012 23	Aktobe	2 – 1	Astana	Aktobe
22:00 (UTC+6)	P.Badlo (yellow card) 39'; Khairullin 6'; Geynrikh 56'; A.Aymbetov (yellow card) 58'	Report	Nusserbayev 49'	Stadium: Central Stadium; Attendance: 7,000; Referee: Aleksandr Gauzer

21 October 2012 24	Astana	1 – 0	Zhetysu	Astana
15:00 (UTC+6)	Nusserbayev 49'	Report	Z.Korobov (yellow card) 50'; Loginovsky (yellow card) 60'	Stadium: Astana Arena; Attendance: 3,000; Referee: Kairat Slambekov

25 October 2012 25	Ordabasy	0 – 0	Astana	Shymkent
16:00 (UTC+6)	T.Adyrbekov (yellow card) 29'; Collins (yellow card) 63'; Mukhtarov (yellow card) 88'	Report		Stadium: Kazhimukan Munaitpasov Stadium; Attendance: 2,000; Referee: Sergey Gorokhovodatskiy

28 October 2012 26	Taraz	1 – 1	Astana	Taraz
17:00 (UTC+6)	M.Muminov (yellow card) 37'; Mehmedović (yellow card) 38'; Diakate (yellow card) 45' (yellow-red card) 90+2' (goal) 84'; Kuchma (yellow card) 82'	Report	Ostapenko 15'; Korobkin (yellow card) 45' (yellow-red card) 90+4'; Shakhmetov (yellow card) 47'	Stadium: Central Stadium; Attendance: 6,200; Referee: Akmalkhan Kholmatov

==== League table ====
Pos	Team	Pld	W	D	L	GF	GA	GD	Pts	Qualification or relegation
3	Aktobe	26	15	5	6	44	22	+22	50	Qualification for the Europa League first qualifying round
4	Taraz	26	14	4	8	32	30	+2	46	
5	Astana	26	13	7	6	34	24	+10	46	Qualification for the Europa League first qualifying round (Note: Astana qualified for the first qualifying round of the 2013–14 UEFA Europa League as winner of 2012 Kazakhstan Cup.)
6	Tobol	26	13	6	7	42	27	+15	45	
7	Ordabasy	26	10	9	7	29	24	+5	39	

Source: FFK (in Russian)
Rules for classification: 1st points;
Two team tiebreak: 1st overall wins; 2nd head-to-head record; 3rd goals difference; 4th goals scored; 5th away goals scored;
Multiple teams tiebreak: 1st overall wins; 2nd goals difference; 3rd goals scored; 4th away goals scored

=== Kazakhstan Cup ===
16 May 2012 First Round	Astana-1964	0 – 1	Astana	Astana
(UTC+6)	N.Bildinov (yellow card) 72'	Report	Rozhkov (yellow card) 39'; Gridin 62'; Shakhmetov (yellow card) 65'; Prokopenko (yellow card) 70'	Stadium: Kazhymukan Munaitpasov Stadium; Attendance: A. Aliyev; Referee: 4,000

20 June 2012 Second Round 1st leg	Ak Bulak	1 – 1	Astana	Zharkent
17:30 (UTC+6)	T.Kanyshev 57'	Report	Aliev (yellow card) 29'; Mukhtarov 71'	Stadium: UTC CSKA Stadium; Attendance: 700; Referee: Igor Khisamutdinov

27 June 2012 Second Round 2nd leg	Astana	2 – 0 (3 – 1 agg.)	Ak Bulak	Astana
17:00 (UTC+6)	Rozhkov 7'; Prokopenko 31'	Report	T.Primzhanov (yellow card) 27'	Stadium: Astana Arena; Attendance: 500; Referee: Aleksei Bobrov

19 September 2012 Quarter Final 1st Leg	Kaisar	1 – 0	Astana	Kyzylorda
17:30 (UTC+6)	Abdulin (yellow card) 39'; Crnogorac (yellow card) 39'; A.Stakhiv 89'	Report		Stadium: Gany Muratbayev Stadium; Attendance: 3,500; Referee: Artyom Kuchin

29 September 2012 Quarter Final 2nd Leg	Astana	4 – 1 (4 – 2 agg.)	Kaisar	Astana
18:00 (UTC+6)	Ostapenko 16'; Beisebekov (yellow card) 29'; Kéthévoama 44' (yellow card) 53'; Kojašević 77', 82'	Report	Parkhachev 56'; Mamić (yellow card) 60'; Džodžo (yellow card) 75'	Stadium: Astana Arena; Attendance: 1,000; Referee: Ruslan Duzmambetov

1 November 2012 Semi Final 1st Leg	Shakhter Karagandy	2 – 1	Astana	Karagandy
15:00 (UTC+6)	Đidić (yellow card) 61'; Kirov 66'; Višņakovs 72'; Cañas (yellow card) 73'; Paryvayew (yellow card) 77'	Report	Đidić 56' (o.g.); Konysbayev (yellow card) 61'	Stadium: Shakhter Stadium; Attendance: 2,000; Referee: Kairat Slambekov

5 November 2012 Semi Final 2nd Leg	Astana	2 – 0 (3 – 2 agg.)	Shakhter Karagandy	Astana
17:00 (UTC+6)	Rozhkov 41'; Kéthévoama 57'	Report	Đidić (yellow card) 37'; Paryvayew (yellow card) 83'; Y.Tarasov (yellow card) 85'	Stadium: Astana Arena; Attendance: 2,500; Referee: Ruslan Duzmambetov

11 November 2012 Final	Astana	2 – 0	Irtysh	Astana
17:00 (UTC+6)	Nurdauletov 5'; Nusserbayev 82'	Report	Chernyshov (yellow card) 18'; Yurin (yellow card) 65'; Coulibaly (yellow card) 73'	Stadium: Astana Arena; Attendance: 11,500; Referee: Kairat Slambekov

== Squad statistics ==
As of match played 11 November 2012

=== Appearances and goals ===
No.	Pos	Nat	Player	Total		Premier League		Kazakhstan Cup	
No.	Pos	Nat	Player	Apps	Goals	Apps	Goals	Apps	Goals
1	GK	(Serbia) SRB	Nenad Erić	30	0	22	0	8	0
3	MF	(Kazakhstan) KAZ	Valeri Korobkin	20	0	14	0	6	0
6	DF	(Kazakhstan) KAZ	Kairat Nurdauletov	26	2	18+1	1	6+1	1
7	MF	(Kazakhstan) KAZ	Ulan Konysbayev	30	3	20+5	3	3+2	0
8	DF	(Kazakhstan) KAZ	Viktor Dmitrenko	24	2	18	2	5+1	0
9	FW	(Kazakhstan) KAZ	Sergei Ostapenko	33	7	22+4	6	6+1	1
15	MF	(Kazakhstan) KAZ	Abzal Beisebekov	19	0	10+3	0	2+4	0
16	DF	(Kazakhstan) KAZ	Yevgeni Goryachi	5	0	0+1	0	3+1	0
17	FW	(Kazakhstan) KAZ	Tanat Nusserbayev	32	11	23+3	10	4+2	1
19	MF	(Cameroon) CMR	Christian Ebala	18	0	15+1	0	2	0
20	MF	(Central African Republic) CAF	Foxi Kéthévoama	29	3	19+4	1	6	2
22	MF	(Kazakhstan) KAZ	Marat Shakhmetov	30	1	15+8	1	7	0
27	DF	(Kazakhstan) KAZ	Mikhail Rozhkov	34	6	26	4	8	2
28	FW	(North Macedonia) MKD	Filip Ivanovski	16	1	4+7	1	2+3	0
29	DF	(North Macedonia) MKD	Dimitrija Lazarevski	31	0	26	0	5	0
40	FW	(Kazakhstan) KAZ	Denis Prokopenko	4	1	0+1	0	3	1
55	GK	(Russia) RUS	Aleksei Belkin	4	0	4	0	0	0
90	MF	(Montenegro) MNE	Damir Kojašević	16	4	4+7	2	3+2	2
Players away from Astana on loan:
5	DF	(Kazakhstan) KAZ	Piraliy Aliev	12	0	1+8	0	3	0
11	FW	(Kazakhstan) KAZ	Sergey Gridin	15	3	9+3	2	1+2	1
Players who appeared for Astana that left during the season:
4	DF	(Kazakhstan) KAZ	Mukhtar Mukhtarov	13	1	11	0	2	1
10	MF	(Romania) ROU	Emil Dică	8	1	2+6	1	0	0
31	MF	(Serbia) SRB	Dušan Petronijević	12	0	3+6	0	3	0

=== Goal scorers ===
Place	Position	Nation	Number	Name	Premier League	Kazakhstan Cup	Total
1	FW	(Kazakhstan)	17	Tanat Nusserbayev	10	1	11
2	FW	(Kazakhstan)	9	Sergei Ostapenko	6	1	7
3	DF	(Kazakhstan)	27	Mikhail Rozhkov	4	2	6
4	FW	(Montenegro)	90	Damir Kojašević	2	2	4
5	MF	(Kazakhstan)	7	Ulan Konysbayev	3	0	3
5	MF	(Central African Republic)	20	Foxi Kéthévoama	1	2	3
5	FW	(Kazakhstan)	11	Sergey Gridin	2	1	3
8	MF	(Kazakhstan)	6	Kairat Nurdauletov	1	1	2
8	DF	(Kazakhstan)	8	Viktor Dmitrenko	2	0	2
10	MF	(Kazakhstan)	22	Marat Shakhmetov	1	0	1
10	FW	(North Macedonia)	28	Filip Ivanovski	1	0	1
10	MF	(Romania)	10	Emil Dică	1	0	1
10	DF	(Kazakhstan)	4	Mukhtar Mukhtarov	0	1	1
10	FW	(Kazakhstan)	40	Denis Prokopenko	0	1	1
10				Own goal	0	1	1
				TOTALS	34	13	47

=== Clean sheets ===
Place	Position	Nation	Number	Name	Premier League	Kazakhstan Cup	Total
1	GK	(Serbia)	1	Nenad Erić	11	4	15
2	GK	(Russia)	55	Aleksei Belkin	1	0	1
				TOTALS	12	4	16

=== Disciplinary record ===
Number	Nation	Position	Name	Premier League		Kazakhstan Cup		Total	
Number	Nation	Position	Name	Yellow card	Red card	Yellow card	Red card	Yellow card	Red card
3	(Kazakhstan)	MF	Valeri Korobkin	4	1	0	0	4	1
6	(Kazakhstan)	DF	Kairat Nurdauletov	2	0	0	0	2	0
7	(Kazakhstan)	MF	Ulan Konysbayev	3	0	1	0	4	0
8	(Kazakhstan)	DF	Viktor Dmitrenko	3	0	0	0	3	0
9	(Kazakhstan)	FW	Sergei Ostapenko	3	0	0	0	3	0
15	(Kazakhstan)	MF	Abzal Beisebekov	0	0	1	0	1	0
17	(Kazakhstan)	MF	Tanat Nusserbayev	1	0	0	0	1	0
19	(Cameroon)	MF	Christian Ebala	1	0	0	0	1	0
20	(Central African Republic)	MF	Foxi Kéthévoama	2	0	1	0	3	0
22	(Kazakhstan)	MF	Marat Shakhmetov	2	0	1	0	3	0
27	(Kazakhstan)	DF	Mikhail Rozhkov	2	0	1	0	3	0
28	(North Macedonia)	FW	Filip Ivanovski	1	0	0	0	1	0
29	(North Macedonia)	DF	Dimitrija Lazarevski	1	0	0	0	1	0
40	(Kazakhstan)	FW	Denis Prokopenko	0	0	1	0	1	0
Players away on loan:
5	(Kazakhstan)	DF	Piraliy Aliev	0	0	1	0	1	0
11	(Kazakhstan)	FW	Sergey Gridin	1	0	0	0	1	0
Players who left Astana during the season:
4	(Kazakhstan)	DF	Mukhtar Mukhtarov	3	1	0	0	3	1
10	(Romania)	MF	Emil Dică	1	0	0	0	1	0
			TOTALS	30	2	7	0	37	2
