= List of Kazakhstan football transfers winter 2015 =

This is a list of Kazakh football transfers in the winter transfer window 2015 by club. Only clubs of the 2015 Kazakhstan Premier League are included.

== Kazakhstan Premier League 2015 ==
=== Aktobe ===
In: Note: Flags indicate national team as defined under FIFA eligibility rules; some limited exceptions apply. Players may hold more than one non-FIFA nationality.

No.	Pos.	Nation	Player
1	GK	KAZ	Stas Pokatilov (from (Kazakhstan) Shakhter Karagandy)
3	DF	NGA	Dele Adeleye (from (Greece) OFI)
8	MF	LTU	Artūras Žulpa (from (Lithuania) Žalgiris Vilnius)
91	FW	KAZ	Sergei Khizhnichenko (from (Poland) Korona Kielce)
99	FW	BRA	Danilo (from (Ukraine) Zorya Luhansk)

Out: Note: Flags indicate national team as defined under FIFA eligibility rules; some limited exceptions apply. Players may hold more than one non-FIFA nationality.

No.	Pos.	Nation	Player
3	DF	KAZ	Aleksei Muldarov (to (Kazakhstan) Kaisar)
5	DF	KAZ	Petr Badlo
6	MF	RUS	Taras Tsarikayev
15	DF	ARM	Robert Arzumanyan (to (Russia) Amkar Perm)
25	DF	KAZ	Sayat Zhumagali
55	GK	KAZ	Andrei Sidelnikov (to (Kazakhstan) Ordabasy)
78	FW	BLR	Ihar Zyankovich (to (Turkey) Elazığspor)
80	MF	UZB	Timur Kapadze (to (Uzbekistan) Lokomotiv Tashkent)
96	MF	KAZ	Anuarbek Sadykov
—	DF	KGZ	Emil Kenzhesariev

=== Astana ===
In: Note: Flags indicate national team as defined under FIFA eligibility rules; some limited exceptions apply. Players may hold more than one non-FIFA nationality.

No.	Pos.	Nation	Player
3	DF	DEN	Kasper Larsen (loan from (Denmark) OB)
6	MF	SRB	Nemanja Maksimović (from (Slovenia) NK Domžale)
7	MF	KAZ	Ulan Konysbayev (from (Kazakhstan) Shakhter Karagandy)
9	FW	KAZ	Aleksey Shchetkin (from (Kazakhstan) Taraz)
13	DF	KAZ	Berik Shaikhov (from (Kazakhstan) Zhetysu)
19	MF	KAZ	Alexey Rodionov (from (Kazakhstan) Atyrau)
21	FW	KAZ	Sergei Ostapenko (from (Kazakhstan) Kaisar)
23	FW	GHA	Patrick Twumasi (from (Latvia) Spartaks Jūrmala, previously on loan)
25	FW	KAZ	Toktar Zhangylyshbay (from (Kazakhstan) Shakhter Karagandy)
40	GK	KAZ	Mikhail Golubnichi (from (Kazakhstan) Irtysh)

Out: Note: Flags indicate national team as defined under FIFA eligibility rules; some limited exceptions apply. Players may hold more than one non-FIFA nationality.

No.	Pos.	Nation	Player
4	DF	KAZ	Viktor Dmitrenko (to (Kazakhstan) Aktobe)
6	DF	KAZ	Kairat Nurdauletov (to (Kazakhstan) Kaisar)
7	FW	MNE	Damir Kojašević (loan to (Uzbekistan) Lokomotiv Tashkent)
13	MF	KAZ	Serikzhan Muzhikov (to (Kazakhstan) Kaisar)
16	DF	KAZ	Yevgeni Goryachi (to (Kazakhstan) Okzhetpes)
24	MF	KAZ	Denis Tolebayev (to (Kazakhstan) Irtysh)
25	MF	CMR	Guy Essame (loan return to (Kazakhstan) Atyrau)
31	MF	KAZ	Azat Smagulov
76	FW	BUL	Atanas Kurdov
32	MF	KAZ	Rinat Khairullin (to (Kazakhstan) Zhetysu)
-	MF	KAZ	Marat Shakhmetov (to (Kazakhstan) Zhetysu)
—	MF	KAZ	Rinat Khayrullin (to (Kazakhstan) Zhetysu)

=== Atyrau ===
In: Note: Flags indicate national team as defined under FIFA eligibility rules; some limited exceptions apply. Players may hold more than one non-FIFA nationality.

No.	Pos.	Nation	Player
1	GK	KAZ	Ilya Bayteryakov
7	MF	CMR	Guy Essame (loan return from (Kazakhstan) Astana)
9	MF	UKR	Volodymyr Arzhanov (from (Ukraine) Chornomorets Odesa)
10	MF	KAZ	Konstantin Zarechny (from (Kazakhstan) Zhetysu)
11	MF	KAZ	Maksat Baizhanov (from (Kazakhstan) Shakhter Karagandy)
12	DF	KAZ	Ruslan Esatov (from (Kazakhstan) Zhetysu)
21	MF	KAZ	Aleksei Marov
22	MF	SEN	Abdoulaye Diakate (from (Kazakhstan) Ordabasy)
23	DF	RUS	Anton Grigoryev (from (Moldova) Veris Chișinău)
28	DF	KAZ	Vladislav Kuzmin (from (Kazakhstan) Zhetysu)
29	DF	KAZ	Berik Aitbayev (from (Kazakhstan) Taraz)
34	GK	KAZ	Zhasur Narzikulov (from (Kazakhstan) Taraz)
39	FW	KAZ	Murat Tleshev (from (Kazakhstan) Taraz)
66	DF	KAZ	Anton Chichulin (from (Turkey) Giresunspor)
99	FW	MNE	Ivan Ivanović (from (Montenegro) FK Rudar)

Out: Note: Flags indicate national team as defined under FIFA eligibility rules; some limited exceptions apply. Players may hold more than one non-FIFA nationality.

No.	Pos.	Nation	Player
1	GK	KAZ	Andrey Shabanov (to (Kazakhstan) Zhetysu)
3	DF	BLR	Pavel Plaskonny (to (Belarus) Vitebsk)
6	MF	KAZ	Aleksey Shakin
10	MF	GEO	George Peikrishvili
18	MF	BLR	Mikhail Afanasyev (to (Belarus) Shakhtyor Soligorsk)
21	MF	KAZ	Andrei Karpovich (to (Kazakhstan) Shakhter Karagandy)
23	DF	KAZ	Rinat Abdulin (to (Kazakhstan) Ordabasy)
27	MF	KAZ	Evgeny Kostrub (to (Kazakhstan) Shakhter Karagandy)
30	GK	KAZ	Anton Tsirin (to (Kazakhstan) Okzhetpes)
32	MF	KAZ	Marat Shakhmetov (loan return to (Kazakhstan) Astana)
33	DF	RUS	Marat Butuyev
40	FW	GHA	Dominic Adiyiah (to (Thailand) Nakhon Ratchasima)
46	MF	SRB	Marko Blažić
90	GK	KAZ	Nurbolat Kalmenov

=== Irtysh ===
In: Note: Flags indicate national team as defined under FIFA eligibility rules; some limited exceptions apply. Players may hold more than one non-FIFA nationality.

No.	Pos.	Nation	Player
1	GK	KAZ	David Loria (from (Turkey) Karşıyaka)
2	DF	KAZ	Vladimir Sedelnikov (from (Kazakhstan) Kairat)
4	DF	KAZ	Aleksandr Kislitsyn (from (Kazakhstan) Kairat)
5	DF	KAZ	Piraliy Aliev (from (Kazakhstan) Ordabasy)
7	MF	RUS	Alan Gatagov (from (Russia) Dynamo Moscow)
8	DF	KAZ	Samat Smakov (from (Kazakhstan) Kairat)
10	MF	KAZ	Alisher Suley (from (Kazakhstan) Tobol)
11	FW	KAZ	Yerkebulan Nurgaliyev (from (Kazakhstan) Spartak Semey)
14	MF	KAZ	Azat Ersalimov (from (Kazakhstan) Spartak Semey)
15	FW	BFA	Aristide Bancé (from (Finland) HJK Helsinki)
22	DF	RUS	Artyom Samsonov (from (Russia) Khimik Dzerzhinsk)
25	DF	KAZ	Ruslan Yesimov (from)
27	MF	RUS	Sergei Ignatyev (loan from (Russia) Arsenal Tula)
32	GK	KAZ	Denis Tolebayev (from (Kazakhstan) Astana)
33	MF	KAZ	Kazbek Geteriev (from (Kazakhstan) Kaisar)
55	DF	CRO	Ivan Graf (from (Croatia) Istra 1961)
89	FW	NGA	Izu Azuka (from (Turkey) Gaziantep BB)

Out: Note: Flags indicate national team as defined under FIFA eligibility rules; some limited exceptions apply. Players may hold more than one non-FIFA nationality.

No.	Pos.	Nation	Player
4	DF	MNE	Miodrag Džudović
7	MF	TKM	Arslanmyrat Amanow (to (Uzbekistan) Olmaliq)
8	MF	KAZ	Evgeniy Averchenko (to (Kazakhstan) Taraz)
11	MF	KGZ	Sergei Ivanov (Retired)
14	MF	KAZ	Igor Yurin (to (Kazakhstan) Tobol)
17	FW	KAZ	Altynbek Dauletkhanov
18	DF	KAZ	Renat Bayanov
22	MF	KAZ	Aleksandr Andreev
25	DF	KAZ	Ihor Chuchman
26	MF	KAZ	Ruslan Akhmetdinov
27	MF	KAZ	Elvin Allayarov
33	GK	KAZ	Vyacheslav Kotlyar (to (Kazakhstan) Shakhter Karagandy)
39	DF	KAZ	Dmitriy Shevchenko
40	GK	KAZ	Mikhail Golubnichi (to (Kazakhstan) Astana)
44	DF	KAZ	Vassiliy Zhukov
50	MF	UKR	Rinar Valeyev (to (Ukraine) Illichivets Mariupol)
52	MF	KAZ	Rustem Kuanyshev
60	DF	BUL	Orlin Starokin (to (Bulgaria) Lokomotiv Sofia)
77	MF	RUS	Almir Mukhutdinov (to (Kazakhstan) Taraz)
98	MF	MNE	Igor Burzanović (to (China) Hunan Billows)

=== Kairat ===
In: Note: Flags indicate national team as defined under FIFA eligibility rules; some limited exceptions apply. Players may hold more than one non-FIFA nationality.

No.	Pos.	Nation	Player
1	GK	KAZ	Vladimir Plotnikov (from (Kazakhstan) Zhetysu)
4	MF	GHA	Ibrahim Moro (from (Sweden) AIK)
22	MF	BRA	Serginho (from (Brazil) Oeste, previously on loan at (Brazil) Palmeiras)
23	MF	KAZ	Ilia Kalinin (from (Kazakhstan) Kaisar)
—	MF	BRA	Paulo César (loan from (Brazil) Corinthians)

Out: Note: Flags indicate national team as defined under FIFA eligibility rules; some limited exceptions apply. Players may hold more than one non-FIFA nationality.

No.	Pos.	Nation	Player
5	DF	KAZ	Aleksandr Kislitsyn (to (Kazakhstan) Irtysh)
8	MF	KAZ	Samat Smakov (to (Kazakhstan) Irtysh)
10	MF	CRO	Josip Knežević
16	GK	RUS	Dmitri Khomich (to (Russia) Amkar Perm)
20	DF	SVK	Ľubomír Michalík (to (Slovakia) DAC Dunajská Streda)
23	FW	SVK	Miloš Lačný (to (Poland) Śląsk Wrocław)
27	MF	ARM	Artur Yedigaryan (to (Belarus) Dinamo Minsk)
—	MF	KAZ	Vladimir Sedelnikov (to (Kazakhstan) Irtysh)

=== Kaisar ===
In: Note: Flags indicate national team as defined under FIFA eligibility rules; some limited exceptions apply. Players may hold more than one non-FIFA nationality.

No.	Pos.	Nation	Player
2	MF	SRB	Vuk Mitošević (loan from (Serbia) Jagodina)
7	MF	KAZ	Serikzhan Muzhikov (from (Kazakhstan) Astana)
10	MF	KAZ	Sergei Skorykh (from (Kazakhstan) Taraz)
14	DF	KAZ	Farkhadbek Irismetov (from (Kazakhstan) Ordabasy)
21	DF	KAZ	Kairat Nurdauletov (from (Kazakhstan) Astana)
25	DF	BUL	Plamen Dimov (from (Bulgaria) Levski Sofia)
31	DF	KAZ	Aleksei Muldarov (from (Kazakhstan) Aktobe)
33	FW	SVK	Juraj Piroska (from (Slovakia) Senica)
35	GK	KAZ	Ramil Nurmukhametov (from (Kazakhstan) Taraz)
86	FW	CRO	Edin Junuzović (from (South Korea) Gyeongnam)

Out: Note: Flags indicate national team as defined under FIFA eligibility rules; some limited exceptions apply. Players may hold more than one non-FIFA nationality.

No.	Pos.	Nation	Player
2	DF	KAZ	Olzhas Altaev
4	DF	MLI	Mamoutou Coulibaly (to (Bulgaria) Cherno More)
10	MF	KGZ	Anton Zemlianukhin (to (Serbia) Radnički Niš)
15	DF	SRB	Miljan Jablan (to (Kazakhstan) Akzhayik)
23	FW	KAZ	Sergei Ostapenko (to (Kazakhstan) Astana)
27	MF	MDA	Valentin Furdui (to (Moldova) Zimbru Chișinău)
29	MF	KAZ	Kazbek Geteriev (to (Kazakhstan) Irtysh)
30	GK	UKR	Yevhen Shyryayev
32	DF	KAZ	Nurzharyk Kunov
35	GK	KAZ	Kirill Korotkevich (to (Kazakhstan) Tobol)
77	MF	KAZ	Ilia Kalinin (to (Kazakhstan) Kairat)
90	MF	SVN	Matic Maruško (to (Kazakhstan) Akzhayik)

=== Okzhetpes ===
In: Note: Flags indicate national team as defined under FIFA eligibility rules; some limited exceptions apply. Players may hold more than one non-FIFA nationality.

No.	Pos.	Nation	Player
5	DF	KAZ	Kirill Pasichnik (from (Kazakhstan) Atyrau)
7	MF	KAZ	Ruslan Sakhalbayev (from (Kazakhstan) Spartak Semey)
11	MF	RUS	Vitali Volkov (from (Kazakhstan) Tobol)
16	DF	KAZ	Yevgeni Goryachi (from (Kazakhstan) Astana)
17	MF	BLR	Alyaksandr Pawlaw (from (Belarus) BATE Borisov)
20	GK	KAZ	Anton Tsirin (from (Kazakhstan) Atyrau)
21	MF	CAN	Joseph Di Chiara (from (Canada) Vaughan Azzurri)
22	DF	CZE	Michal Smejkal (loan from (Czech Republic) Mladá Boleslav)
26	FW	RUS	Dmitri Sychev (loan from (Russia) Lokomotiv Moscow)
45	FW	MNE	Luka Rotković (from (Montenegro) Mornar)
77	DF	UKR	Oleksandr Chyzhov (from (Ukraine) Illichivets Mariupol)
88	FW	RUS	Daniil Chertov (from (Russia) Khimki)

Out: Note: Flags indicate national team as defined under FIFA eligibility rules; some limited exceptions apply. Players may hold more than one non-FIFA nationality.

No.	Pos.	Nation	Player
—	DF	GUY	Jamaal Smith (to (Canada) Vaughan Azzurri)
—	MF	KGZ	Anatoliy Vlasichev

=== Ordabasy ===
In: Note: Flags indicate national team as defined under FIFA eligibility rules; some limited exceptions apply. Players may hold more than one non-FIFA nationality.

No.	Pos.	Nation	Player
15	DF	SRB	Branislav Trajković (from (Serbia) Partizan)
23	DF	KAZ	Rinat Abdulin (from (Kazakhstan) Atyrau)
25	DF	KAZ	Serhiy Malyi (from (Kazakhstan) Shakhter Karagandy)
26	MF	UKR	Kyrylo Petrov (from (Poland) Korona Kielce)
29	GK	KAZ	Sergey Boychenko (from (Kazakhstan) Spartak Semey)
40	FW	CRO	Ivan Božić (from (China) Beijing Baxy)
50	FW	UZB	Alexander Geynrikh (from (Uzbekistan) Lokomotiv Tashkent)
55	GK	KAZ	Andrei Sidelnikov (from (Kazakhstan) Aktobe)
87	DF	SRB	Aleksandar Simčević (from (Kazakhstan) Shakhter Karagandy)

Out: Note: Flags indicate national team as defined under FIFA eligibility rules; some limited exceptions apply. Players may hold more than one non-FIFA nationality.

No.	Pos.	Nation	Player
2	DF	BRA	Freire (loan return to (Portugal) Nacional)
6	DF	KAZ	Piraliy Aliev (from (Kazakhstan) Irtysh)
9	FW	KAZ	Sergey Gridin (to (Latvia) Spartaks Jūrmala)
11	MF	CZE	Ondřej Kúdela (to (Czech Republic) Mladá Boleslav)
14	DF	UGA	Andrew Mwesigwa
25	MF	SEN	Abdoulaye Diakate (to (Kazakhstan) Atyrau)
27	GK	KAZ	Andrei Tsvetkov
38	DF	KAZ	Ali Aliyev
39	FW	KAZ	Maksim Filchakov

=== Shakhter Karagandy ===
In: Note: Flags indicate national team as defined under FIFA eligibility rules; some limited exceptions apply. Players may hold more than one non-FIFA nationality.

No.	Pos.	Nation	Player
1	GK	KAZ	Igor Shatskiy
5	MF	BRA	Pedro Sass (from (Israel) Hapoel Ra'anana)
6	MF	KAZ	Andrei Karpovich (from (Kazakhstan) Atyrau)
21	DF	KAZ	Gregory Dubkov (from (Kazakhstan) Gefest)
23	MF	KAZ	Eugene Kostrub (from (Kazakhstan) Atyrau)
24	FW	CZE	Jan Vošahlík (from (Czech Republic) Baumit Jablonec)
25	DF	KAZ	Eugene Azamatov
33	GK	KAZ	Vyacheslav Kotlyar (from (Kazakhstan) Irtysh)
44	MF	KAZ	Kuanish Ermekov
52	DF	TRI	Aubrey David (from (Trinidad and Tobago) Caledonia AIA)

Out: Note: Flags indicate national team as defined under FIFA eligibility rules; some limited exceptions apply. Players may hold more than one non-FIFA nationality.

No.	Pos.	Nation	Player
1	GK	KAZ	Stas Pokatilov (to (Kazakhstan) Aktobe)
3	DF	LTU	Gediminas Vičius (to (Kazakhstan) Zhetysu)
7	MF	KAZ	Maksat Baizhanov (to (Kazakhstan) Atyrau)
10	GK	KAZ	Ulan Konysbayev (to (Kazakhstan) Astana)
25	DF	KAZ	Serhiy Malyi (to (Kazakhstan) Ordabasy)
27	FW	UZB	Kamoliddin Murzoev (to (Uzbekistan) Olmaliq)
29	MF	UZB	Shavkat Salomov (to (Uzbekistan) Olmaliq)
52	DF	SVK	Ján Maslo (to (Slovakia) Ružomberok)
84	DF	KAZ	Aleksandr Kirov (to (Kazakhstan) Zhetysu)
87	DF	SRB	Aleksandar Simčević (to (Kazakhstan) Ordabasy)

=== Taraz ===
In: Note: Flags indicate national team as defined under FIFA eligibility rules; some limited exceptions apply. Players may hold more than one non-FIFA nationality.

No.	Pos.	Nation	Player
1	GK	KAZ	Aleksandr Grigorenko (from (Kazakhstan) Ordabasy)
9	FW	KAZ	Sanat Zhumahanov
11	FW	KAZ	Sherkhan Bauyrzhan (from (Kazakhstan) Shakhter Karagandy)
12	DF	ROU	Ioan Mera (from (Romania) Rapid București)
17	FW	UKR	Oleksandr Pyschur (from (Uzbekistan) Bunyodkor)
22	DF	KAZ	Madiyar Nuraly
30	MF	KAZ	Evgeniy Averchenko (from (Kazakhstan) Irtysh)
77	MF	RUS	Almir Mukhutdinov (from (Kazakhstan) Irtysh)

Out: Note: Flags indicate national team as defined under FIFA eligibility rules; some limited exceptions apply. Players may hold more than one non-FIFA nationality.

No.	Pos.	Nation	Player
1	GK	KAZ	Ramil Nurmukhametov (to (Kazakhstan) Kaisar)
2	DF	SUR	Sigourney Bandjar
3	DF	KAZ	Aleksandr Kuchma
5	MF	KAZ	Sergei Skorykh (to (Kazakhstan) Kaisar)
9	FW	KAZ	Murat Tleshev (to (Kazakhstan) Atyrau)
12	FW	KAZ	Aleksey Shchetkin (to (Kazakhstan) Astana)
13	DF	KAZ	Berik Aitbayev (to (Kazakhstan) Atyrau)
15	DF	SVN	Rok Roj (to (Uzbekistan) Nasaf)
17	MF	KAZ	Oleg Nedashkovsky (to (Kazakhstan) Tobol)
77	DF	KAZ	Zhasur Narzikulov (to (Kazakhstan) Atyrau)

=== Tobol ===
In: Note: Flags indicate national team as defined under FIFA eligibility rules; some limited exceptions apply. Players may hold more than one non-FIFA nationality.

No.	Pos.	Nation	Player
1	GK	KAZ	Kirill Korotkevich (from (Kazakhstan) Kaisar)
6	MF	ARM	Karlen Mkrtchyan (from (Ukraine) Metalurh Donetsk)
14	MF	KAZ	Igor Yurin (from (Kazakhstan) Irtysh)
15	FW	NGA	Uche Kalu (from (Turkey) Çaykur Rizespor)
16	DF	EST	Sergei Mošnikov (from (Estonia) Flora)
17	DF	KAZ	Oleg Nedashkovsky (from (Kazakhstan) Taraz)
24	DF	LTU	Arūnas Klimavičius (from (Kazakhstan) Zhetysu)

Out: Note: Flags indicate national team as defined under FIFA eligibility rules; some limited exceptions apply. Players may hold more than one non-FIFA nationality.

No.	Pos.	Nation	Player
1	GK	KAZ	Ivan Sivozhelezov (to (Kyrgyzstan) Alga)
2	DF	KAZ	Aleksandr Shkot
7	FW	KAZ	Alisher Suley (to (Kazakhstan) Irtysh)
11	MF	RUS	Vitali Volkov (to (Kazakhstan) Okzhetpes)
13	DF	CZE	Ondřej Kušnír (to (Czech Republic) Sigma Olomouc)
14	DF	KAZ	Farkhadbek Irismetov (loan return to (Kazakhstan) Ordabasy)
21	MF	KAZ	Aleksei Malyshev
22	FW	KAZ	Beybut Abishev
23	MF	KAZ	Raul Jalilov (to (Kazakhstan) FC Bolat)
99	FW	CZE	Jiří Jeslínek (to (Slovenia) Celje)

=== Zhetysu ===
In: Note: Flags indicate national team as defined under FIFA eligibility rules; some limited exceptions apply. Players may hold more than one non-FIFA nationality.

No.	Pos.	Nation	Player
1	GK	KAZ	Andrey Shabanov (from (Kazakhstan) Atyrau)
3	DF	LTU	Gediminas Vičius (from (Kazakhstan) Shakhter Karagandy)
5	MF	KAZ	Marat Shakhmetov (from (Kazakhstan) Astana)
8	DF	KAZ	Serik Sagyndykov (from (Kazakhstan) Spartak Semey)
9	FW	KAZ	Baurzhan Turysbek (from (Serbia) Radnički Niš)
10	FW	MKD	Dušan Savić (from (Bulgaria) Slavia Sofia)
11	MF	KAZ	Marlan Muzhikov (from (Kazakhstan) Gefest)
13	MF	KAZ	Ilyas Amirseitov (from (Kazakhstan) Spartak Semey)
14	DF	KAZ	Aleksandr Kirov (from (Kazakhstan) Shakhter Karagandy)
18	MF	KAZ	Maksim Azovskiy (from (Kazakhstan) Spartak Semey)
19	MF	KAZ	Rinat Khayrullin (from (Kazakhstan) Astana)
21	DF	SRB	Miloš Mihajlov (from (Serbia) Voždovac)
23	DF	KAZ	Ashat Mynbaev
31	MF	SRB	Ivan Cvetković (from (Serbia) Jagodina)
89	FW	SRB	Djordje Despotović (loan from (Serbia) Red Star Belgrade)

Out: Note: Flags indicate national team as defined under FIFA eligibility rules; some limited exceptions apply. Players may hold more than one non-FIFA nationality.

No.	Pos.	Nation	Player
4	DF	CIV	Didier Kadio (to (Finland) Jaro)
7	FW	KAZ	Sergei Schaff
9	FW	KAZ	Beibut Tatishev
10	MF	KAZ	Konstantin Zarechny (to (Kazakhstan) Atyrau)
11	MF	KAZ	Konstantin Zotov
12	DF	KAZ	Ruslan Esatov (to (Kazakhstan) Atyrau)
14	DF	KAZ	Nurzhan Nusipzhanov
18	MF	KAZ	Taras Danilyuk
21	FW	BIH	Mersudin Ahmetović (to (Bosnia and Herzegovina) Sloboda Tuzla)
28	DF	KAZ	Vladislav Kuzmin (to (Kazakhstan) Atyrau)
29	DF	LTU	Arūnas Klimavičius (to (Kazakhstan) Tobol)
33	GK	KAZ	Vladimir Plotnikov (to (Kazakhstan) Kairat)
50	MF	KAZ	Alisher Yesimkhanov
77	MF	SRB	Marko Putinčanin
79	FW	CIV	Boti Goa
