= 2014 FC Shakhter Karagandy season =

FC Shakhter Karagandy
2014 season
- Chairman: Yerden Khalilin
- Manager: Viktor Kumykov
- Stadium: Shakhter Stadium
- Kazakhstan Premier League: 6th
- Kazakhstan Super Cup: Runners-Up
- Kazakhstan Cup: Semi-finals vs Kairat
- Europa League: Third Qualifying Round vs Hajduk Split
- Top goalscorer: League: Mihret Topcagić (10); All: Mihret Topcagić (14)
Home colours	Away colours	Third colours

The 2014 FC Shakhter Karagandy season was the 23rd successive season that the club played in the Kazakhstan Premier League, the highest tier of association football in Kazakhstan. Shakhter Karagandy finished the season in 6th position, reached the Semi-finals of the Kazakhstan Cup and the Third Qualifying Round of the UEFA Europa League.

== Squad ==
As of 19 November 2014

Note: Flags indicate national team as defined under FIFA eligibility rules; some limited exceptions apply. Players may hold more than one non-FIFA nationality.

No.	Pos.	Nation	Player
1	GK	KAZ	Stas Pokatilov
3	MF	LTU	Gediminas Vičius
4	DF	BIH	Nikola Vasiljević
5	MF	KAZ	Askhat Borantayev
7	MF	KAZ	Maksat Baizhanov
9	FW	BIH	Mihret Topčagić
10	MF	KAZ	Ulan Konysbayev
14	FW	KAZ	Andrei Finonchenko
15	MF	KAZ	Sherkhan Bauyrzhan
17	DF	BLR	Andrey Paryvaew
18	MF	CRO	Nikola Pokrivač
19	DF	KAZ	Yevgeni Tarasov

No.	Pos.	Nation	Player
20	DF	BIH	Aldin Đidić
21	FW	KAZ	Toktar Zhangylyshbai
22	DF	KAZ	Mikhail Gabyshev
25	DF	KAZ	Serhiy Malyi
27	FW	UZB	Kamoliddin Murzoev
29	MF	UZB	Shavkat Salomov
35	GK	KAZ	Aleksandr Mokin
45	FW	KAZ	Roman Murtazayev
52	DF	SVK	Ján Maslo
84	MF	KAZ	Aleksandr Kirov
87	DF	SRB	Aleksandar Simčević

=== Reserve team ===
Note: Flags indicate national team as defined under FIFA eligibility rules; some limited exceptions apply. Players may hold more than one non-FIFA nationality.

No.	Pos.	Nation	Player
12	GK	KAZ	Marlene Imagambetov
15	MF	KAZ	Akhat Zholshorin
24	DF	KAZ	Arman Sakhimov
27	MF	KAZ	Nursultan Zhusupov
28	DF	KAZ	Marat Rakishev
29	FW	KAZ	Khamid Nurmukhametov
33	DF	KAZ	Vladlen Antoshhuk
37	DF	KAZ	Aleksandr Zemtsov

No.	Pos.	Nation	Player
38	DF	KAZ	Aleksandr Nuikin
39	DF	KAZ	Aleksandr Matyshev
40	MF	KAZ	Anton Olenich
42	MF	KAZ	Sergey Vetrov
43	DF	KAZ	Dmitry Moiseev
44	MF	KAZ	Kuanysh Ermekov
47	MF	KAZ	Aslanbek Arshkenov

== Transfers ==
=== Winter ===
In: Note: Flags indicate national team as defined under FIFA eligibility rules; some limited exceptions apply. Players may hold more than one non-FIFA nationality.

No.	Pos.	Nation	Player
6	DF	POR	Yago (from (Sweden) Häcken)
9	FW	BIH	Mihret Topcagić (from (Austria) Wolfsberger AC)
10	MF	KAZ	Ulan Konysbayev (from (Kazakhstan) Astana)
27	MF	UZB	Kamoliddin Murzoev (from (Kazakhstan) Irtysh Pavlodar)
29	MF	UZB	Shavkat Salomov (from (Kazakhstan) Zhetysu)
84	DF	KAZ	Aleksandr Kirov (from (Kazakhstan) Astana)
—	FW	KAZ	Daurenbek Tazhimbetov (loan return from (Kazakhstan) Astana)

Out: Note: Flags indicate national team as defined under FIFA eligibility rules; some limited exceptions apply. Players may hold more than one non-FIFA nationality.

No.	Pos.	Nation	Player
13	MF	KAZ	Vadim Borovskiy
21	MF	KAZ	Aslan Darabayev (to (Kazakhstan) Kairat)
21	GK	KAZ	Sergey Tkachuk
28	MF	ARM	Gevorg Ghazaryan (loan return to (Ukraine) Metalurh Donetsk)
78	FW	BLR	Ihar Zyankovich (to (Kazakhstan) Aktobe)
88	MF	COL	Roger Cañas (to (Kazakhstan) Astana)
91	FW	KAZ	Sergei Khizhnichenko (to (Poland) Korona Kielce)
—	FW	KAZ	Daurenbek Tazhimbetov (to (Kazakhstan) Ordabasy)

=== Summer ===
In: Note: Flags indicate national team as defined under FIFA eligibility rules; some limited exceptions apply. Players may hold more than one non-FIFA nationality.

No.	Pos.	Nation	Player
15	MF	KAZ	Sherkhan Bauyrzhan (from (Kazakhstan) Kairat)
19	MF	CRO	Nikola Pokrivač (from (Croatia) Rijeka)
52	DF	CZE	Ján Maslo (from (Ukraine) Volyn Lutsk)

Out: Note: Flags indicate national team as defined under FIFA eligibility rules; some limited exceptions apply. Players may hold more than one non-FIFA nationality.

No.	Pos.	Nation	Player
6	DF	POR	Yago (to (Portugal) Oriental)
28	FW	KAZ	Stanislav Lunin (to (Kazakhstan) Kairat)

== Competitions ==
=== Kazakhstan Super Cup ===
9 March 2014	Aktobe	1 – 0	Shakhter Karagandy	Astana
14:00 (UTC+6)	Logvinenko (yellow card) 32'; Neco 68'	Summary	Simčević (yellow card) 38'; Konysbayev (yellow card) 58'	Stadium: Astana Arena; Attendance: 14,000; Referee: Ruslan Duzmambetov

=== Kazakhstan Premier League ===
==== First round ====
===== Results summary =====
Overall								Home						Away					
Pld	W	D	L	GF	GA	GD	Pts	W	D	L	GF	GA	GD	W	D	L	GF	GA	GD
22	11	3	8	33	27	+6	36	8	3	0	22	6	+16	3	0	8	11	21	−10

Last updated: 5 January 2014.
Source: Soccerway

===== Results by round =====
Round	1	2	3	4	5	6	7	8	9	10	11	12	13	14	15	16	17	18	19	20	21	22
Ground	A	H	A	A	H	A	H	A	H	A	H	A	H	H	A	H	A	H	A	H	A	H
Result	L	D	W	W	W	W	W	L	D	L	W	L	W	W	L	W	L	W	L	W	L	D
Position	10	8	5	5	3	2	2	3	3	3	3	5	3	2	3	3	5	3	4	4	4	4

Source: Soccerway
A = Away; H = Home; W = Win; D = Draw; L = Loss

===== Results =====
15 March 2014 1	Irtysh	1 – 0	Shakhter Karagandy	Pavlodar
15:00 (UTC+6)	Bakayev (yellow card) 25'; Z.Korobov (yellow card) 28'; Averchenko 32'; Burzanović (yellow card) 74'; Ivanov (yellow card) 81'	Summary	Vičius (yellow card) 62'; Paryvaew (yellow card) 84'	Stadium: Central Stadium; Attendance: 4,500; Referee: Marat Iskakov

22 March 2014 2	Shakhter Karagandy	1 – 1	Aktobe	Karaganda
15:00 (UTC+6)	Malyi (yellow card) 17'; Simčević (yellow card) 27'; Vasiljević (yellow card) 35'; T.Zhangylyshbai 65' (yellow card) 85'	Summary	Logvinenko (yellow card) 32' (goal) 45'; Khairullin (red card) 85'	Stadium: Shakhter Stadium; Attendance: 4,000; Referee: Viktor Antonov

29 March 2014 3	Taraz	1 – 5	Shakhter Karagandy	Taraz
15:00 (UTC+6)	Barroilhet (yellow card) 31'; I.Vorotnikov (yellow card) 75'; Roj 80'	Summary	Vičius 15'; Konysbayev 44'; Salomov 53', 68'; Finonchenko 70'; Paryvaew (yellow card) 89'	Stadium: Central Stadium; Attendance: 3,000; Referee: Bolat Karlibayev

5 April 2014 4	Spartak Semey	0 – 1	Shakhter Karagandy	Semey
14:00 (UTC+6)	S.Sagindikov (yellow card) 19'; B.Turysbek (yellow card) 44' (red card) 45+2'; Dyulgerov (yellow card) 65'; Azovskiy (yellow card) 69'	Summary	Vičius (yellow card) 9'; T.Zhangylyshbai (yellow card) 27'; Vasiljević 29'; Yago (red card) 45+2'; Konysbayev (yellow card) 56'	Stadium: Spartak Stadium; Attendance: 1,000; Referee: Aleksandr Gauzer

9 April 2014 5	Shakhter Karagandy	2 – 0	Atyrau	Karaganda
16:00 (UTC+6)	Konysbayev (yellow card) 51'; Finonchenko (yellow card) 54'; Odibe 57' (o.g.); Baizhanov (yellow card) 64'; Paryvaew (yellow card) 72' (goal) 90'; Simčević (yellow card) 85'	Summary	Essame (yellow card) 65'	Stadium: Shakhter Stadium; Attendance: 3,000; Referee: Akmalkhan Kholmatov

13 April 2014 6	Zhetysu	1 – 2	Shakhter Karagandy	Taldykorgan
16:00 (UTC+6)	S.Schaff 16'; Putinčanin (yellow card) 33'; D.Rodionov (yellow card) 46'	Summary	Baizhanov 21'; T.Zhangylyshbai 28'; Salomov (yellow card) 34'; Vičius (yellow card) 49'; Simčević (yellow card) 83'	Stadium: Zhetysu Stadium; Attendance: 2,500; Referee: Askhat Abdanbayev

19 April 2014 7	Shakhter Karagandy	3 – 1	Ordabasy	Karaganda
16:00 (UTC+6)	Baizhanov 7'; Salomov 20'; Vičius 46'; Simčević (yellow card) 69'	Summary	Mukhtarov (yellow card) 20'; Kasyanov (yellow card) 23'; Ashirbekov (yellow card) 54'; Diakate (yellow card) 90'; M.Tolebek 90+1'	Stadium: Shakhter Stadium; Attendance: 5,000; Referee: Igor Khisamutdinov

27 April 2014 8	Kaisar	1 – 0	Shakhter Karagandy	Kyzylorda
17:00 (UTC+6)	I.Kalinin 69'; A.Baltaev (yellow card) 90+1'	Summary	Baizhanov (yellow card) 48'; Vičius (yellow card) 62'; Yago (yellow card) 67'; Paryvaew (yellow card) 74'	Stadium: Gany Muratbayev Stadium; Attendance: 3,500; Referee: Igor Chesnokov

1 May 2014 9	Shakhter Karagandy	0 – 0	Astana	Karagandy
16:00 (UTC+6)		Summary	Dmitrenko (yellow card) 59'; V.Lee (yellow card) 73'	Stadium: Shakhter Stadium; Attendance: 4,500; Referee: Igor Aleshin

6 May 2014 10	Kairat	2 – 0	Shakhter Karagandy	Almaty
19:00 (UTC+6)	Knežević 9'; Ceesay 67'; Khomich (yellow card) 78'	Summary	Yago (yellow card) 51'; Murzoev (yellow card) 67'	Stadium: Central Stadium; Attendance: 9,000; Referee: Denis Izmailov

10 May 2014 11	Shakhter Karagandy	4 – 1	Tobol	Karagandy
17:00 (UTC+6)	Finonchenko (yellow card) 13' (goal) 84'; Konysbayev 22', 45'; Malyi (yellow card) 55'; Topcagić 74'	Summary	Šimkovič (yellow card) 34'; Bogdanov (yellow card) 72'; Kurgulin (yellow card) 78'; R.Dzhalilov 82'	Stadium: Shakhter Stadium; Attendance: 7,000; Referee: Viktor Antonov

18 May 2014 12	Aktobe	4 – 0	Shakhter Karagandy	Aktobe
19:30 (UTC+6)	P.Badlo (yellow card) 20'; Danilo Neco 30' (yellow card) 83'; Zyankovich (yellow card) 36'; D.Miroshnichenko 63'; Geynrikh 65'; Pizzelli 87'	Summary	Vičius (yellow card) 33'; Finonchenko (yellow card) 77'; T.Zhangylyshbai (yellow card) 85'	Stadium: Central Stadium; Attendance: 3,000; Referee: Aydin Rakhimbayev

24 May 2014 13	Shakhter Karagandy	1 – 0	Taraz	Karagandy
17:30 (UTC+6)	Vasiljević (yellow card) 84'; Baizhanov (yellow card) 84'; Topcagić 90+2'	Summary	I.Vorotnikov (yellow card) 30'; Sergienko (yellow card) 84'; Skorykh (yellow card) 88'; D.Babakhanov (yellow card) 90+1'	Stadium: Shakhter Stadium; Attendance: 5,000; Referee: Aleksandr Gauzer

28 May 2014 14	Shakhter Karagandy	1 – 0	Spartak Semey	Karagandy
18:30 (UTC+6)	Vičius 9'; Vasiljević (yellow card) 38'; Murtazayev (yellow card) 50'; Finonchenko (yellow card) 65'; Malyi (yellow card) 84'	Summary	Ovshinov (yellow card) 53' (red card) 90+2'; I.Amirseitov (yellow card) 79'; Y.Nurgaliyev (yellow card) 90+4'	Stadium: Shakhter Stadium; Attendance: 3,000; Referee: Askhat Abdanbayev

1 June 2014 15	Atyrau	3 – 2	Shakhter Karagandy	Atyrau
18:00 (UTC+6)	Karpovich 35'; Blažić 54'; Trifunović 85' (pen.)	Summary	Yago 61'; T.Zhangylyshbai 74'; Murzoev (yellow card) 74'; Simčević (yellow card) 85'	Stadium: Munaishy Stadium; Attendance: 5,000; Referee: Ruslan Duzmambetov

14 June 2014 16	Shakhter Karagandy	3 – 0	Zhetysu	Karagandy
18:30 (UTC+6)	Vasiljević 4' (yellow card) 89'; Topcagić 13', 40'; Kirov (yellow card) 25'; Salomov (yellow card) 45+1'; Vičius (yellow card) 68'	Summary	Kovalev (yellow card) 48' (yellow-red card) 73'; Klimavičius (yellow card) 67'; Putinčanin (yellow card) 79'	Stadium: Shakhter Stadium; Attendance: 3,500; Referee: Anatolyi Vishnichenko

22 June 2014 17	Ordabasy	2 – 1	Shakhter Karagandy	Shymkent
18:00 (UTC+6)	Kasyanov 53'; Nurgaliev 58'; G.Suyumbaev (yellow card) 90+4'	Summary	Paryvaew 6'; Konysbayev (yellow card) 25'; Pokrivač (yellow card) 71'	Stadium: Kazhimukan Munaitpasov Stadium; Attendance: 4,000; Referee: Marat Iskakov

27 June 2014 18	Shakhter Karagandy	4 – 1	Kaisar	Karaganda
18:30 (UTC+6)	Finonchenko (yellow card) 12'; Konysbayev 15'; Topčagić 42', 58'; Murtazayev 43'; Malyi (yellow card) 83'	Summary	Hunt 86'	Stadium: Shakhter Stadium; Attendance: 3,000; Referee: Igor Khisamutdinov

6 July 2014 19	Astana	4 – 0	Shakhter Karagandy	Astana
15:00 (UTC+6)	Kojašević (yellow card) 6'; Beisebekov 25'; Kéthévoama 29'; Zhukov (yellow card) 62'; Dzholchiev 64'; Aničić (yellow card) 72'; Nusserbayev 85'	Summary	A.Borantayev (yellow card) 6'; Đidić (red card) 34'	Stadium: Astana Arena; Attendance: 3,000; Referee: Ruslan Duzmambetov

13 July 2014 20	Shakhter Karagandy	1 – 0	Kairat	Karaganda
16:30 (UTC+6)	Topcagić 21' (yellow card) 69'; Finonchenko (yellow card) 63'	Summary	Michalík (yellow card) 65'; Khomich (yellow card) 72'	Stadium: Shakhter Stadium; Attendance: 4,000; Referee: Igor Aleshin

27 July 2014 21	Tobol	2 – 0	Shakhter Karagandy	Kostanay
18:00 (UTC+6)	Šimkovič 36'; R.Dzhalilov (yellow card) 85'; Jeslínek 90+3'	Summary	Kirov (yellow card) 83'	Stadium: Central Stadium; Attendance: 3,000; Referee: Akmalkhan Kholmatov

3 August 2014 22	Shakhter Karagandy	2 – 2	Irtysh	Karaganda
16:30 (UTC+6)	Baizhanov (yellow card) 31'; Simčević (yellow card) 67'; Topcagić 82'; Vičius 86'; Maslo (yellow card) 90'; Finonchenko (yellow card) 90+1'	Summary	Dudchenko 46', 79'; Mukhutdinov (yellow card) 67'; Amanow (yellow card) 81'	Stadium: Shakhter Stadium; Attendance: 3,000; Referee: Igor Chesnokov

===== League table =====
Pos	Team	Pld	W	D	L	GF	GA	GD	Pts	Qualification
2	Kairat	22	13	3	6	41	20	+21	42	Qualification for the championship round
3	Astana	22	10	9	3	34	17	+17	39	Qualification for the championship round
4	Shakhter Karagandy	22	11	3	8	33	27	+6	36	Qualification for the championship round
5	Ordabasy	22	10	5	7	24	22	+2	35	Qualification for the championship round
6	Kaisar	22	8	8	6	23	23	0	32	Qualification for the championship round

Source: Soccerway (in Russian)
Rules for classification: 1st points;
Two team tiebreak: 1st overall wins; 2nd head-to-head record; 3rd goals difference; 4th goals scored; 5th away goals scored;
Multiple teams tiebreak: 1st overall wins; 2nd goals difference; 3rd goals scored; 4th away goals scored

==== Championship Round ====
===== Results summary =====
Overall								Home						Away					
Pld	W	D	L	GF	GA	GD	Pts	W	D	L	GF	GA	GD	W	D	L	GF	GA	GD
10	0	3	7	8	22	−14	3	0	3	2	3	6	−3	0	0	5	5	16	−11

Last updated: 2 January 2015.
Source: Soccerway

===== Results by round =====
Round	1	2	3	4	5	6	7	8	9	10
Ground	H	A	H	A	H	H	A	H	A	A
Result	D	L	D	L	L	D	L	L	L	L
Position	4	4	4	4	5	5	5	6	6	6

Source: Soccerway
A = Away; H = Home; W = Win; D = Draw; L = Loss

===== Results =====
24 August 2014 1	Shakhter Karagandy	0 – 0	Kaisar	Karaganda
16:30 (UTC+6)	Maslo (yellow card) 21'; Konysbayev (yellow card) 69'; Paryvaew (yellow card) 90+5'	Summary	K.Pryadkin (yellow card) 62'; Shestakov (yellow card) 69'; Klein (yellow card) 71'; Strukov (yellow card) 72'	Stadium: Shakhter Stadium; Attendance: 1,500; Referee: Aleksandr Gauzer

28 August 2014 2	Kairat	6 – 1	Shakhter Karagandy	Almaty
20:00 (UTC+6)	Kislitsyn 44'; Isael 46', 69'; Gohou 57', 59'; A.Darabayev 68'	Summary	Vičius 21'; Pokrivač (yellow card) 75'; Maslo (yellow card) 85'	Stadium: Central Stadium; Attendance: 7,500; Referee: Ruslan Duzmambetov

14 September 2014 3	Shakhter Karagandy	1 – 1	Aktobe	Karaganda
17:30 (UTC+6)	Paryvaew (yellow card) 24'; Simčević (yellow card) 45'; Topcagić (yellow card) 75' (yellow-red card) 85'; Mokin (yellow card) 80'; Finonchenko 90+1' (yellow card) 90+1'	Summary	D.Miroshnichenko (yellow card) 43'; Khairullin (yellow card) 45' (goal) 88'; Korobkin (yellow card) 52'; Muldarov (yellow card) 90'	Stadium: Shakhter Stadium; Attendance: 4,200; Referee: Viktor Antonov

20 September 2014 4	Astana	2 – 0	Shakhter Karagandy	Astana
17:00 (UTC+6)	Shomko 36'; Twumasi 48'	Summary	Malyi (yellow card) 25'; Konysbayev (yellow card) 78'; S.Bauyrzhan (yellow card) 87'	Stadium: Astana Arena; Attendance: 3,500; Referee: Askhat Abdanbayev

28 September 2014 5	Shakhter Karagandy	2 – 3	Ordabasy	Karaganda
17:00 (UTC+6)	Maslo (yellow card) 45+1'; Topcagić 61', 90+1' (pen.); Pokrivač (yellow card) 76'; Vičius (yellow card) 88'	Summary	T.Adyrbekov (yellow card) 31'; Nurgaliev 42' (yellow card) 51'; Y.Tungyshbayev 45'; B.Beisenov 68'	Stadium: Shakhter Stadium; Attendance: 3,000; Referee: Denis Izmailov

4 October 2014 6	Shakhter Karagandy	0 – 0	Kairat	Karaganda
16:00 (UTC+6)	Paryvaew (yellow card) 61'; Murzoev (yellow card) 82'	Summary	Kislitsyn (yellow card) 5'; S.Lunin (yellow card) 32'; E.Kuantayev (yellow card) 44'; Yedigaryan (yellow card) 84'	Stadium: Shakhter Stadium; Attendance: 2,000; Referee: Igor Khisamutdinov

18 October 2014 7	Aktobe	3 – 1	Shakhter Karagandy	Aktobe
18:00 (UTC+6)	Antonov 11', 42'; A.Tagybergen (yellow card) 56'; Pizzelli 67'	Summary	Kirov (yellow card) 44'; Finonchenko 77'; Vičius (yellow card) 78'	Stadium: Central Stadium; Attendance: 7,000; Referee: Akmalkhan Kholmatov

25 October 2014 8	Shakhter Karagandy	0 – 2	Astana	Karagandy
16:00 (UTC+6)	Salomov (yellow card) 33'	Summary	Kurdov 33' (pen.), 80'	Stadium: Shakhter Stadium; Attendance: 1,500; Referee: Igor Aleshin

1 November 2014 9	Ordabasy	3 – 2	Shakhter Karagandy	Shymkent
15:00 (UTC+6)	Nurgaliev 18' (yellow card) 44'; Kasyanov 27'; Tazhimbetov 65'	Summary	Murtazayev 41' (yellow card) 76'; Baizhanov (yellow card) 50'; M.Gabyshev 82'	Stadium: Kazhimukan Munaitpasov Stadium; Attendance: 2,000; Referee: Aydin Rakhimbayev

9 November 2014 10	Kaisar	2 – 1	Shakhter Karagandy	Kyzylorda
15:00 (UTC+6)	N.Kunov (yellow card) 43'; Z.Moldakaraev 52' (pen.), 80' (pen.) (yellow card) 62'	Summary	Maslo 18' (yellow card) 79'; Murtazayev (yellow card) 43'; M.Gabyshev (yellow card) 51'	Stadium: Gany Muratbayev Stadium; Attendance: 4,000; Referee: Marat Iskakov

===== Table =====
Pos	Team	Pld	W	D	L	GF	GA	GD	Pts	Qualification
2	Aktobe	32	17	10	5	52	31	+21	40	Qualification for the Europa League first qualifying round
3	Kairat	32	18	5	9	58	31	+27	38	Qualification for the Europa League first qualifying round
4	Ordabasy	32	13	5	14	34	44	−10	27	Qualification for the Europa League first qualifying round
5	Kaisar	32	10	13	9	30	34	−4	27	
6	Shakhter Karagandy	32	11	6	15	41	49	−8	21	

Source: Soccerway (in Russian)
Rules for classification: 1st points;
Two team tiebreak: 1st overall wins; 2nd head-to-head record; 3rd goals difference; 4th goals scored; 5th away goals scored;
Multiple teams tiebreak: 1st overall wins; 2nd goals difference; 3rd goals scored; 4th away goals scored.
Team start with half number of points from first round.

=== Kazakhstan Cup ===
14 May 2014 Second Round	Shakhter Karagandy	3 – 0	Lashin Taraz	Karaganda
19:00 (UTC+6)	T.Zhangylyshbai (yellow card) 16'; Topcagić 64'; Malyi (yellow card) 63'; M.Gabyshev 67'; Murtazayev 74'	Summary	D.Konysbaev (yellow card) 37'; A.Zhusupov (yellow card) 54'; A.Sultanbekov (yellow card) 63'; E.Shokanov (yellow card) 81'	Stadium: Shakhter Stadium; Attendance: 3,000; Referee: Denis Tevyashov

18 June 2014 Quarter-final	Shakhter Karagandy	1 – 0	Irtysh Pavlodar	Karaganda
18:30 (UTC+6)	Paryvaew (yellow card) 43'; Murzoev 61'; Vičius (yellow card) 71'; Vasiljević (yellow card) 86'	Summary	Chernyshov (yellow card) 40'; Bakayev (yellow card) 90+3'	Stadium: Shakhter Stadium; Attendance: 2,500; Referee: Askhat Abdanbayev

16 August 2014 Semi Final 1st leg	Kairat	2 – 0	Shakhter Karagandy	Almaty
20:00 (UTC+6)	Riera 20'; Darabaev 86'; Michalík (yellow card) 90+3'; Smakov (yellow card) 90+3'	Summary	T.Zhangylyshbai (yellow card) 90+3' (yellow-red card) 90+4'	Stadium: Central Stadium; Attendance: 8,000; Referee: Igor Aleshin

24 September 2014 Semi Final 2nd leg	Shakhter Karagandy	0 – 2 (0 – 4 agg.)	Kairat	Karagandy
18:00 (UTC+6)		Summary	Marković (yellow card) 68'; Isael 83'; Kislitsyn 87'	Stadium: Shakhtyor Stadium; Attendance: 5,000; Referee: Ruslan Duzmambetov

=== UEFA Europa League ===
==== Qualifying rounds ====
3 July 2014 First qualifying round 1st leg	Shirak (Armenia)	1 – 2	(Kazakhstan) Shakhter Karagandy	Gyumri, Armenia
20:00 (UTC+6)	Marikyan (yellow card) 75'; Déblé 85' (pen.)	Report	Simčević (yellow card) 13'; Vičius (yellow card) 57'; Topcagić 71'; Finonchenko (yellow card) 77'; Malyi 83'	Stadium: Gyumri City Stadium; Attendance: 2,500; Referee: Yuriy Mozharovskyy (Ukraine)

10 July 2014 First qualifying round 2nd leg	Shakhter Karagandy (Kazakhstan)	4 – 0 (6 – 1 agg.)	(Armenia) Shirak	Karaganda, Kazakhstan
18:30 (UTC+6)	Kpodo 12' (o.g.); Konysbayev 29'; Pokrivač 45+1'; Finonchenko 49'; Simčević (yellow card) 77'	Report	Muradyan (yellow card) 30'; Kpodo (yellow card) 39'; Hakobyan (yellow card) 90+1'	Stadium: Shakhter Stadium; Attendance: 11,200; Referee: Eitan Shemeulevitch (Israel)

17 July 2014 Second qualifying round 1st leg	Atlantas (Lithuania)	0 – 0	(Kazakhstan) Shakhter Karagandy	Klaipėda, Lithuania
22:00 (UTC+6)	Eliošius (yellow card) 43'; Gnedojus (yellow card) 86'	Report	Pokrivač (yellow card) 60'; Maslo (yellow card) 70'; Malyi (yellow card) 87'	Stadium: Central stadium of Klaipėda; Attendance: 3,000; Referee: Ognjen Valjić (Bosnia and Herzegovina)

24 July 2014 Second qualifying round 2nd leg	Shakhter Karagandy (Kazakhstan)	3 – 0 (3 – 0 agg.)	(Lithuania) Atlantas	Karaganda, Kazakhstan
19:30 (UTC+6)	Topcagić 46' (yellow card) 68'; Konysbayev (yellow card) 53' (goal) 61'; Simčević (yellow card) 56'; Pokrivač (yellow card) 59'; Murtazayev 90+3'	Report	Papšys (yellow card) 36'; Kazlauskas (yellow card) 53'; Jokšas (yellow card) 55'	Stadium: Shakhter Stadium; Attendance: 12,200; Referee: Dumitru Muntean (Moldova)

31 July 2014 Third qualifying round 1st leg	Shakhter Karagandy (Kazakhstan)	4 – 2	(Croatia) Hajduk Split	Karaganda, Kazakhstan
18:30 (UTC+6)	Topcagić 11'; Finonchenko 21'; Kirov (yellow card) 50'; Maslo (yellow card) 56'; Đidić 71'; Baizhanov (yellow card) 77'; Malyi (yellow card) 80'; Paryvaew (yellow card) 90+2'; Zhangylyshbai 90+4'	Report	Gotal 2'; Caktaš 78' (pen.)	Stadium: Shakhter Stadium; Attendance: 13,300; Referee: Aliyar Ağayev (Azerbaijan)

7 August 2014 Third qualifying round 2nd leg	Hajduk Split (Croatia)	3 – 0 (5 – 4 agg.)	(Kazakhstan) Shakhter Karagandy	Split, Croatia
23:30 (UTC+6)	Sušić 14'; Maglica 36' (yellow card) 90+3'; Nižić (yellow card) 72'; Gotal (yellow card) 85' (goal) 90+5'	Report	Maslo (yellow card) 47'	Stadium: Stadion Poljud; Attendance: 28,000; Referee: Tony Chapron (France)

== Squad statistics ==
As of Match played 9 November 2014

=== Appearances and goals ===
No.	Pos	Nat	Player	Total		Premier League		Kazakhstan Cup		UEFA Europa League		Kazakhstan Super Cup	
No.	Pos	Nat	Player	Apps	Goals	Apps	Goals	Apps	Goals	Apps	Goals	Apps	Goals
1	GK	(Kazakhstan) KAZ	Stas Pokatilov	7	0	6	0	1	0	0	0	0	0
3	MF	(Lithuania) LTU	Gediminas Vičius	39	5	27+2	5	4	0	6	0	0	0
4	DF	(Bosnia and Herzegovina) BIH	Nikola Vasiljević	13	2	11	2	1	0	0	0	1	0
5	MF	(Kazakhstan) KAZ	Askhat Borantayev	3	0	1+1	0	1	0	0	0	0	0
7	MF	(Kazakhstan) KAZ	Maksat Baizhanov	32	2	19+5	2	2+1	0	0+4	0	1	0
9	FW	(Bosnia and Herzegovina) BIH	Mihret Topcagić	36	14	13+12	10	3+1	1	6	3	1	0
10	MF	(Kazakhstan) KAZ	Ulan Konysbayev	39	6	25+4	4	3	0	6	2	1	0
14	FW	(Kazakhstan) KAZ	Andrei Finonchenko	35	6	22+4	4	2+1	0	5	2	1	0
15	MF	(Kazakhstan) KAZ	Sherkhan Bauyrzhan	10	0	2+7	0	0+1	0	0	0	0	0
17	DF	(Belarus) BLR	Andrey Paryvaew	31	2	23+2	2	3	0	2	0	1	0
19	DF	(Kazakhstan) KAZ	Yevgeni Tarasov	11	0	9+1	0	1	0	0	0	0	0
18	MF	(Croatia) CRO	Nikola Pokrivač	17	1	8+1	0	2	0	6	1	0	0
20	DF	(Bosnia and Herzegovina) BIH	Aldin Đidić	14	1	6	0	2	0	6	1	0	0
21	FW	(Kazakhstan) KAZ	Toktar Zhangylyshbai	21	4	9+8	3	1+1	0	0+2	1	0	0
22	DF	(Kazakhstan) KAZ	Mikhail Gabyshev	17	2	9+6	1	1+1	1	0	0	0	0
25	DF	(Kazakhstan) KAZ	Serhiy Malyi	38	1	28	0	3	0	6	1	1	0
27	FW	(Uzbekistan) UZB	Kamoliddin Murzoev	31	1	12+10	0	1+2	1	0+5	0	0+1	0
29	MF	(Uzbekistan) UZB	Shavkat Salomov	33	3	22+6	3	1+1	0	0+2	0	0+1	0
35	GK	(Kazakhstan) KAZ	Aleksandr Mokin	36	0	26	0	3	0	6	0	1	0
44	MF	(Kazakhstan) KAZ	Kuanysh Ermekov	4	0	0+3	0	1	0	0	0	0	0
45	FW	(Kazakhstan) KAZ	Roman Murtazayev	31	4	14+8	2	4	1	0+4	1	1	0
47	MF	(Kazakhstan) KAZ	Aslanbek Arshkenov	1	0	0	0	0+1	0	0	0	0	0
52	DF	(Slovakia) SVK	Ján Maslo	17	1	10	1	1	0	6	0	0	0
84	MF	(Kazakhstan) KAZ	Aleksandr Kirov	21	0	13+1	0	1	0	6	0	0	0
87	DF	(Serbia) SRB	Aleksandar Simčević	34	0	24+1	0	3	0	5	0	1	0
Players who appeared for Shakhter Karagandy that left during the season:
6	DF	(Portugal) POR	Yago	10	1	6+3	1	0	0	0	0	1	0
28	FW	(Kazakhstan) KAZ	Stanislav Lunin	14	0	7+5	0	0+1	0	0	0	0+1	0

=== Goal scorers ===
Place	Position	Nation	Number	Name	Premier League	Kazakhstan Cup	UEFA Europa League	Kazakhstan Super Cup	Total
1	FW	(Bosnia and Herzegovina)	9	Mihret Topcagić	10	1	3	0	14
2	FW	(Kazakhstan)	14	Andrei Finonchenko	4	0	2	0	6
2	MF	(Kazakhstan)	10	Ulan Konysbayev	4	0	2	0	6
4	MF	(Lithuania)	3	Gediminas Vičius	5	0	0	0	5
5	FW	(Kazakhstan)	21	Toktar Zhangylyshbai	3	0	1	0	4
5	FW	(Kazakhstan)	45	Roman Murtazayev	2	1	1	0	4
7	MF	(Uzbekistan)	29	Shavkat Salomov	3	0	0	0	3
8	DF	(Bosnia and Herzegovina)	4	Nikola Vasiljević	2	0	0	0	2
8	MF	(Belarus)	17	Andrey Paryvaew	2	0	0	0	2
8	MF	(Kazakhstan)	7	Maksat Baizhanov	2	0	0	0	2
8	DF	(Kazakhstan)	22	Mikhail Gabyshev	1	1	0	0	2
8				Own goal	1	0	1	0	2
13	DF	(Portugal)	6	Yago	1	0	0	0	1
13	DF	(Slovakia)	52	Ján Maslo	1	0	0	0	1
13	FW	(Uzbekistan)	27	Kamoliddin Murzoev	0	1	0	0	1
13	DF	(Kazakhstan)	25	Serhiy Malyi	0	0	1	0	1
13	MF	(Croatia)	18	Nikola Pokrivač	0	0	1	0	1
13	DF	(Bosnia and Herzegovina)	20	Aldin Đidić	0	0	1	0	1
				TOTALS	41	4	13	0	58

=== Disciplinary record ===
Number	Nation	Position	Name	Premier League		Kazakhstan Cup		UEFA Europa League		Kazakhstan Super Cup		Total	
Number	Nation	Position	Name	Yellow card	Red card	Yellow card	Red card	Yellow card	Red card	Yellow card	Red card	Yellow card	Red card
3	(Lithuania)	MF	Gediminas Vičius	8	0	1	0	1	0	0	0	10	0
4	(Bosnia and Herzegovina)	DF	Nikola Vasiljević	4	0	1	0	0	0	0	0	5	0
5	(Kazakhstan)	MF	Askhat Borantayev	1	0	0	0	0	0	0	0	1	0
6	(Portugal)	DF	Yago	2	1	0	0	0	0	0	0	2	1
7	(Kazakhstan)	MF	Maksat Baizhanov	5	0	0	0	1	0	0	0	6	0
9	(Bosnia and Herzegovina)	FW	Mihret Topcagić	3	1	0	0	1	0	0	0	4	1
10	(Kazakhstan)	MF	Ulan Konysbayev	5	0	0	0	1	0	1	0	7	0
14	(Kazakhstan)	FW	Andrei Finonchenko	8	0	0	0	1	0	0	0	9	0
15	(Kazakhstan)	MF	Sherkhan Bauyrzhan	1	0	0	0	0	0	0	0	1	0
17	(Belarus)	MF	Andrey Paryvaew	7	0	1	0	1	0	0	0	9	0
18	(Croatia)	MF	Nikola Pokrivač	3	0	0	0	2	0	0	0	5	0
20	(Bosnia and Herzegovina)	DF	Aldin Đidić	0	1	0	0	0	0	0	0	0	1
21	(Kazakhstan)	FW	Toktar Zhangylyshbai	3	0	3	1	0	0	0	0	6	1
22	(Kazakhstan)	DF	Mikhail Gabyshev	1	0	0	0	0	0	0	0	1	0
25	(Kazakhstan)	DF	Serhiy Malyi	5	0	1	0	2	0	0	0	8	0
27	(Uzbekistan)	FW	Kamoliddin Murzoev	3	0	0	0	0	0	0	0	3	0
28	(Uzbekistan)	MF	Shavkat Salomov	3	0	0	0	0	0	0	0	3	0
35	(Kazakhstan)	GK	Aleksandr Mokin	1	0	0	0	0	0	0	0	1	0
45	(Kazakhstan)	FW	Roman Murtazayev	3	0	0	0	0	0	0	0	3	0
52	(Slovakia)	DF	Ján Maslo	5	0	0	0	3	0	0	0	8	0
84	(Kazakhstan)	MF	Aleksandr Kirov	3	0	0	0	1	0	0	0	4	0
87	(Serbia)	DF	Aleksandar Simčević	7	0	0	0	3	0	1	0	11	0
			TOTALS	81	3	7	1	17	0	2	0	107	4
