= 2012 Kazakhstan Premier League =

- Season: 2012
- Champions: Shakhter Karagandy
- Relegated: Sunkar; Okzhetpes
- Champions League: Shakhter Karagandy
- Europa League: Astana; Irtysh Pavlodar; Aktobe
- Matches: 144
- Goals: 348 (2.42 per match)
- Top goalscorer: Ulugbek Bakaev and Ihar Zyankovich (9)
- Biggest home win: Astana 5-0 Atyrau
- Biggest away win: Zhetysu 1–5 Shakhter
- Highest scoring: Zhetysu 5–2 Kaisar

The 2012 Kazakhstan Premier League was the 21st season of the Kazakhstan Premier League, the highest football league competition in Kazakhstan. The season was scheduled to start on 9 March 2012 and to conclude on 27 October 2012 Shakhter Karagandy as the defending champions having won their first league championship last year succeeded in preservation of its league title.

The league was expanded from twelve to fourteen teams for this season.

== Changes from 2011 season ==
The league was expanded from twelve to fourteen teams for this season. This also led to a change in the competition modus. The second phase with it separate play-off groups for championship and relegation has been abolished; all teams will play a single home-and-away round-robin schedule.

== Teams ==
Promoted

- Sunkar
- Okzhetpes
- Akzhayik

Relegated

- Vostok
Locations of teams in the 2012 Kazakhstan Premier League

| Team | Location | Venue | Capacity |
|---|---|---|---|
| Aktobe | Aktobe | Aktobe Central Stadium | 13,500 |
| Akzhayik | Oral | Petr Atoyan Stadium | 8,320 |
| Astana | Astana | Astana Arena | 30,000 |
| Atyrau | Atyrau | Munayshy Stadium | 9,000 |
| Irtysh | Pavlodar | Pavlodar Central Stadium | 15,000 |
| Kairat | Almaty | Almaty Central Stadium | 25,057 |
| Kaisar | Kyzylorda | Gany Muratbayev Stadium | 7,300 |
| Okzhetpes | Kokshetau | Okzhetpes Stadium | 10,000 |
| Ordabasy | Shymkent | K. Munaitpasov Stadium, Shymkent | 37,000 |
| Shakhter | Karagandy | Shakhtyor Stadium | 19,000 |
| Sunkar | Kaskelen | Tauelsizdik 10 zhyldygy | 2,500 |
| Taraz | Taraz | Taraz Central Stadium | 12,525 |
| Tobol | Kostanay | Kostanay Central Stadium | 8,323 |
| Zhetysu | Taldykorgan | Zhetysu Stadium | 4,000 |

=== Personnel and kits ===
Note: Flags indicate national team as has been defined under FIFA eligibility rules. Players and Managers may hold more than one non-FIFA nationality.

| Team | Manager | Captain | Kit manufacturer | Shirt sponsor |
|---|---|---|---|---|
| Aktobe | (Russia) Vladimir Mukhanov | (Kazakhstan) Samat Smakov | adidas | — |
| Akzhayik | (Slovakia) Jozef Škrlík | | | |
| Astana | (Czech Republic) Miroslav Beránek | (Kazakhstan) Nurbol Zhumaskaliyev | adidas | Qazaqstan Temir Zholy |
| Atyrau | (Kazakhstan) Yuriy Konkov | (Kazakhstan) Andrei Travin | adidas | |
| Irtysh | (Kazakhstan) Talgat Baisufinov | (Kazakhstan) David Loria | Nike | ENRC |
| Kairat | (Spain) José Pérez Serer | (Kazakhstan) Ruslan Baltiev | adidas | KazRosGaz |
| Kaisar | (Kazakhstan) Vladimir Nikitenko | (Slovenia) Borut Semler | adidas | — |
| Okzhetpes | (Kazakhstan) Vladimir Cheburin | | Umbro | — |
| Ordabasy | (Ukraine) Viktor Pasulko | (Kazakhstan) Kairat Ashirbekov | adidas | — |
| Shakhter | (Russia) Viktor Kumykov | (Kazakhstan) Andrey Finonchenko | Umbro | ArcelorMittal |
| Sunkar | (Kazakhstan) Vladimir Gulyaimkhadarov | | | |
| Taraz | (Serbia) Ljupko Petrović | (Kazakhstan) Nurtas Kurgulin | Nike | — |
| Tobol | (Ukraine) Vyacheslav Grozny | (Kazakhstan) Aleksandr Petukhov | Erreà | — |
| Zhetysu | (Serbia) Slobodan Krčmarević | | Nike | — |

=== Managerial changes ===
| Team | Outgoing manager | Manner of departure | Date of vacancy | Position in table | Replaced by | Date of appointment |
|---|---|---|---|---|---|---|
| Kairat | (England) John Gregory | Sacked | December 2011 | Pre-Season | (Kazakhstan) Dmitry Ogay | December 2011 |
| Okzhetpes | (Ukraine) Viktor Dohadailo | | | 14th | (Kazakhstan) Vladimir Cheburin | March 2012 |
| Astana | (Ukraine) Oleh Protasov | Resign | | 10th | (Czech Republic) Miroslav Beránek | April 2012 |
| Kaisar | (Kazakhstan) Sergei Kogai | | | 13th | (Kazakhstan) Vladimir Nikitenko | April 2012 |
| Zhetysu | (Kazakhstan) Serik Abdualiyev | | | 13th | (Serbia) Slobodan Krčmarević | May 9, 2012 |
| Kairat | (Kazakhstan) Dmitry Ogai | | | 10th | (Spain) Jose Perez Serer | |

=== Foreign players ===
The number of foreign players is restricted to eight per KPL team. A team can use only five foreign players on the field in each game.

| Club | Player 1 | Player 2 | Player 3 | Player 4 | Player 5 | Player 6 | Player 7 | Player 8 |
|---|---|---|---|---|---|---|---|---|
| Aktobe | (Trinidad and Tobago) **Robert Primus** | (Czech Republic) Lukáš Bajer | (Kyrgyzstan) **Emil Kenzhesariev** | (Lithuania) **Arūnas Klimavičius** | (Moldova) **Serghei Covalciuc** | (Uzbekistan) **Alexander Geynrikh** | (Uzbekistan) **Marat Bikmaev** | (Uzbekistan) **Timur Kapadze** |
| Akzhayik | (Slovenia) **Borut Semler** | (Czech Republic) Jakub Chleboun | (Kyrgyzstan) **Anatoliy Vlasichev** | (Czech Republic) Pavel Černý | (Montenegro) Miloš Stojčev | (Belarus) Ihar Zyankovich | (Cameroon) **Haman Sadjo** | (Slovakia) **Miloš Brezinský** |
| Astana | (Serbia) Nenad Erić | (Cameroon) Christian Ebala | (Central African Republic) **Foxi Kéthévoama** | (North Macedonia) **Filip Ivanovski** | (North Macedonia) **Dimitrija Lazarevski** | (Russia) Aleksei Belkin | (Montenegro) Damir Kojašević | |
| Atyrau | (Serbia) **Đorđe Tutorić** | (Russia) Artyom Fomin | (Portugal) Fausto | (Brazil) Sandro | (Serbia) Vladimir Buač | (Brazil) Nivaldo | (Iceland) **Hannes Sigurðsson** | (Serbia) Nikola Milanković |
| Irtysh | (Mali) **Mamoutou Coulibaly** | (Bulgaria) Nemanja Džodžo | (Uzbekistan) **Ulugbek Bakayev** | (Czech Republic) Štěpán Kučera | (Bosnia and Herzegovina) **Darko Maletić** | (Cameroon) Titi Essomba | (Serbia) Predrag Govedarica | |
| Kairat | (Spain) Alberto Heredia | (Scotland) Stuart Duff | (Serbia) Marko Đorđević | (Croatia) Josip Knežević | (Spain) Souto | (Spain) Óscar | (Belarus) Alyaksandr Bychanok | |
| Kaisar | (Serbia) Nemanja Džodžo | (Bosnia and Herzegovina) **Gradimir Crnogorac** | (Serbia) **Marjan Marković** | (Ukraine) Oleg Khromtsov | (Nigeria) Philip Edeipo | (Serbia) Bojan Mamić | (Belarus) Dmitri Parkhachev | (Morocco) Karim Fachtali |
| Okzhetpes | (Serbia) Marko Milovanović | (Romania) Adrian Grigoruță | (Romania) Ovidiu Mendizov | (Georgia (country)) Davit Chagelishvili | (Turkmenistan) **Arslanmyrat Amanow** | | | |
| Ordabasy | (Uganda) **Andrew Mwesigwa** | (Serbia) Aleksandar Trajković | (Senegal) Gueye Mansour | (Ukraine) Artem Kasyanov | (Nigeria) Baba Collins | (Serbia) Vladimir Đilas | (Tunisia) Mohamed Arouri | |
| Shakhter Karagandy | (Lithuania) **Gediminas Vičius** | (Bosnia and Herzegovina) **Nikola Vasiljević** | (Latvia) **Eduards Višņakovs** | (Belarus) **Andrey Paryvayew** | (Serbia) Filip Arsenijević | (Bosnia and Herzegovina) Aldin Đidić | (Colombia) Roger Cañas | |
| Sunkar | (Czech Republic) Stanislav Nohýnek | (Bosnia and Herzegovina) Rade Đokić | (Serbia) Goran Cvetković | (Moldova) **Gheorghe Ovseanicov** | (Lithuania) **Mantas Savėnas** | (Serbia) Dragomir Vukobratović | | |
| Taraz | (Serbia) Ersin Mehmedović | (Senegal) Abdoulaye Diakate | (Croatia) **Neven Vukman** | (Serbia) Miroslav Lečić | (Serbia) Ognjen Krasić | (Nigeria) Obiora Odita | (Serbia) Ivan Perić | |
| Tobol | (Belarus) Syarhey Kantsavy | (Brazil) Jhonnes | (Moldova) Igor Bugaiov | (Serbia) Nenad Šljivić | (North Macedonia) **Mensur Kurtiši** | (Russia) Vitali Volkov | (Serbia) Nemanja Jovanović | (Russia) Sergei Strukov |
| Zhetysu | (Bulgaria) Tanko Dyakov | (Cyprus) Siniša Dobrašinović | (Serbia) Danilo Belić | (Serbia) Miloš Mihajlov | (Croatia) Edin Junuzović | (Serbia) Zoran Kostić | (Serbia) Marko Đalović | |

In bold: Players that have been capped for their national team.

== League table ==
| Pos | Team | Pld | W | D | L | GF | GA | GD | Pts | Qualification or relegation |
|---|---|---|---|---|---|---|---|---|---|---|
| 1 | Shakhter Karagandy (C) | 26 | 17 | 2 | 7 | 48 | 15 | +33 | 53 | Qualification for the Champions League second qualifying round |
| 2 | Irtysh Pavlodar | 26 | 15 | 6 | 5 | 46 | 20 | +26 | 51 | Qualification for the Europa League first qualifying round |
| 3 | Aktobe | 26 | 15 | 5 | 6 | 44 | 22 | +22 | 50 | Qualification for the Europa League first qualifying round |
| 4 | Taraz | 26 | 14 | 4 | 8 | 32 | 30 | +2 | 46 | |
| 5 | Astana | 26 | 13 | 7 | 6 | 34 | 24 | +10 | 46 | Qualification for the Europa League first qualifying round (Note: Astana qualified for the first qualifying round of the 2013–14 UEFA Europa League as winner of 2012 Kazakhstan Cup.) |
| 6 | Tobol | 26 | 13 | 6 | 7 | 42 | 27 | +15 | 45 | |
| 7 | Ordabasy | 26 | 10 | 9 | 7 | 29 | 24 | +5 | 39 | |
| 8 | Akzhayik | 26 | 10 | 4 | 12 | 34 | 39 | −5 | 34 | |
| 9 | Kaisar | 26 | 8 | 6 | 12 | 21 | 33 | −12 | 30 | |
| 10 | Kairat | 26 | 7 | 8 | 11 | 23 | 34 | −11 | 29 | |
| 11 | Atyrau | 26 | 7 | 6 | 13 | 16 | 32 | −16 | 27 | |
| 12 | Zhetysu | 26 | 6 | 5 | 15 | 27 | 45 | −18 | 23 | |
| 13 | Sunkar (R) | 26 | 5 | 8 | 13 | 16 | 31 | −15 | 23 | Relegation to the Kazakhstan First Division |
| 14 | Okzhetpes (R) | 26 | 3 | 2 | 21 | 20 | 56 | −36 | 11 | Relegation to the Kazakhstan First Division |

Source: FFK (in Russian)
Rules for classification: 1st points;
Two team tiebreak: 1st overall wins; 2nd head-to-head record; 3rd goals difference; 4th goals scored; 5th away goals scored;
Multiple teams tiebreak: 1st overall wins; 2nd goals difference; 3rd goals scored; 4th away goals scored
(C) Champions; (R) Relegated

== Results ==
| Home \ Away | AKT | AKZ | AST | ATY | IRT | KRT | KSR | OKZ | ORD | SHA | SUN | TAR | TOB | ZHE |
|---|---|---|---|---|---|---|---|---|---|---|---|---|---|---|
| Aktobe | | 3–4 | 2–1 | 1–0 | 1–0 | 1–1 | 2–0 | 5–2 | 0–0 | 1–0 | 2–1 | 4–1 | 0–1 | 4–0 |
| Akzhayik | 1–0 | | 0–1 | 3–1 | 0–1 | 1–2 | 0–0 | 2–1 | 1–1 | 0–1 | 1–1 | 3–0 | 2–1 | 2–2 |
| Astana | 1–0 | 2–1 | | 5–0 | 2–2 | 2–1 | 3–0 | 1–4 | 1–0 | 1–0 | 0–0 | 0–2 | 1–1 | 1–0 |
| Atyrau | 0–2 | 0–1 | 1–0 | | 0–2 | 2–0 | 0–1 | 1–0 | 2–3 | 0–2 | 1–0 | 0–0 | 1–1 | 2–1 |
| Irtysh Pavlodar | 1–2 | 3–1 | 3–0 | 0–0 | | 1–0 | 1–1 | 3–0 | 3–0 | 1–0 | 4–0 | 1–1 | 4–1 | 3–0 |
| Kairat | 0–3 | 2–1 | 0–2 | 1–1 | 0–0 | | 1–1 | 3–0 | 1–1 | 0–1 | 1–3 | 2–1 | 1–0 | 1–0 |
| Kaisar | 0–2 | 1–2 | 0–1 | 1–0 | 2–0 | 1–1 | | 1–0 | 2–1 | 1–0 | 2–1 | 1–2 | 1–2 | 1–0 |
| Okzhetpes | 1–4 | 0–3 | 1–3 | 1–2 | 1–4 | 1–1 | 2–2 | | 1–2 | 0–2 | 0–2 | 3–1 | 0–1 | 1–0 |
| Ordabasy | 1–1 | 2–0 | 0–0 | 1–1 | 2–1 | 0–0 | 1–0 | 1–1 | | 0–1 | 3–1 | 1–3 | 2–0 | 4–1 |
| Shakhter Karagandy | 2–0 | 3–1 | 0–1 | 4–0 | 0–1 | 4–1 | 3–0 | 4–0 | 1–1 | | 2–0 | 1–0 | 3–0 | 5–1 |
| Sunkar | 0–1 | 1–0 | 1–1 | 0–0 | 0–1 | 0–2 | 0–0 | 3–1 | 0–0 | 0–2 | | 0–1 | 0–0 | 1–0 |
| Taraz | 1–0 | 3–2 | 1–1 | 0–1 | 3–2 | 2–1 | 1–0 | 2–0 | 2–1 | 1–1 | 1–0 | | 1–0 | 1–3 |
| Tobol | 2–2 | 6–0 | 3–2 | 1–0 | 2–2 | 4–0 | 2–0 | 3–1 | 1–0 | 3–1 | 4–0 | 0–1 | | 2–1 |
| Zhetysu | 1–1 | 1–2 | 1–1 | 1–0 | 1–2 | 2–1 | 5–2 | 1–0 | 0–1 | 1–5 | 1–1 | 2–0 | 1–1 | |

Legend: Blue = home team win; Yellow = draw; Red = away team win.

== Top goalscorers ==
| Rank | Player | Club | Goals (Pen.) |
|---|---|---|---|
| 1 | (Uzbekistan) Ulugbek Bakaev | Irtysh | 14 (4) |
| 2 | (Kazakhstan) Tanat Nuserbaev | Astana | 10 |
| 2 | (Belarus) Ihar Zyankovich | Akzhayik | 10 (3) |
| 4 | (Kazakhstan) Baurzhan Dzholchiyev | Tobol | 8 |
| 4 | (Croatia) Edin Junuzović | Zhetysu | 8 |
| 6 | (Senegal) Mansour Gueye | Ordabasy | 7 |
| 6 | (Serbia) Miroslav Lečić | Taraz | 7 |
| 6 | (Russia) Sergei Strukov | Irtysh/Tobol | 7 |
| 6 | (Kazakhstan) Daurenbek Tazhimbetov | Ordabasy | 7 |
| 6 | (Lithuania) Gediminas Vičius | Shakhter Karagandy | 7 |

== Attendances ==
| # | Club | Average |
|---|---|---|
| 1 | Aktobe | 6,877 |
| 2 | Kairat | 6,577 |
| 3 | Taraz | 5,092 |
| 4 | Shakhter | 5,077 |
| 5 | Irtysh | 5,008 |
| 6 | Akzhaiyk | 4,769 |
| 7 | Tobol | 4,592 |
| 8 | Astana | 4,515 |
| 9 | Kaysar | 3,769 |
| 10 | Ordabasy | 3,538 |
| 11 | Atyrau | 2,342 |
| 12 | Zhetysu | 2,292 |
| 13 | Okzhetpes | 1,762 |
| 14 | Sunkar | 1,654 |
