= Mihret Topčagić =

Bosnian professional footballer (born 1988)

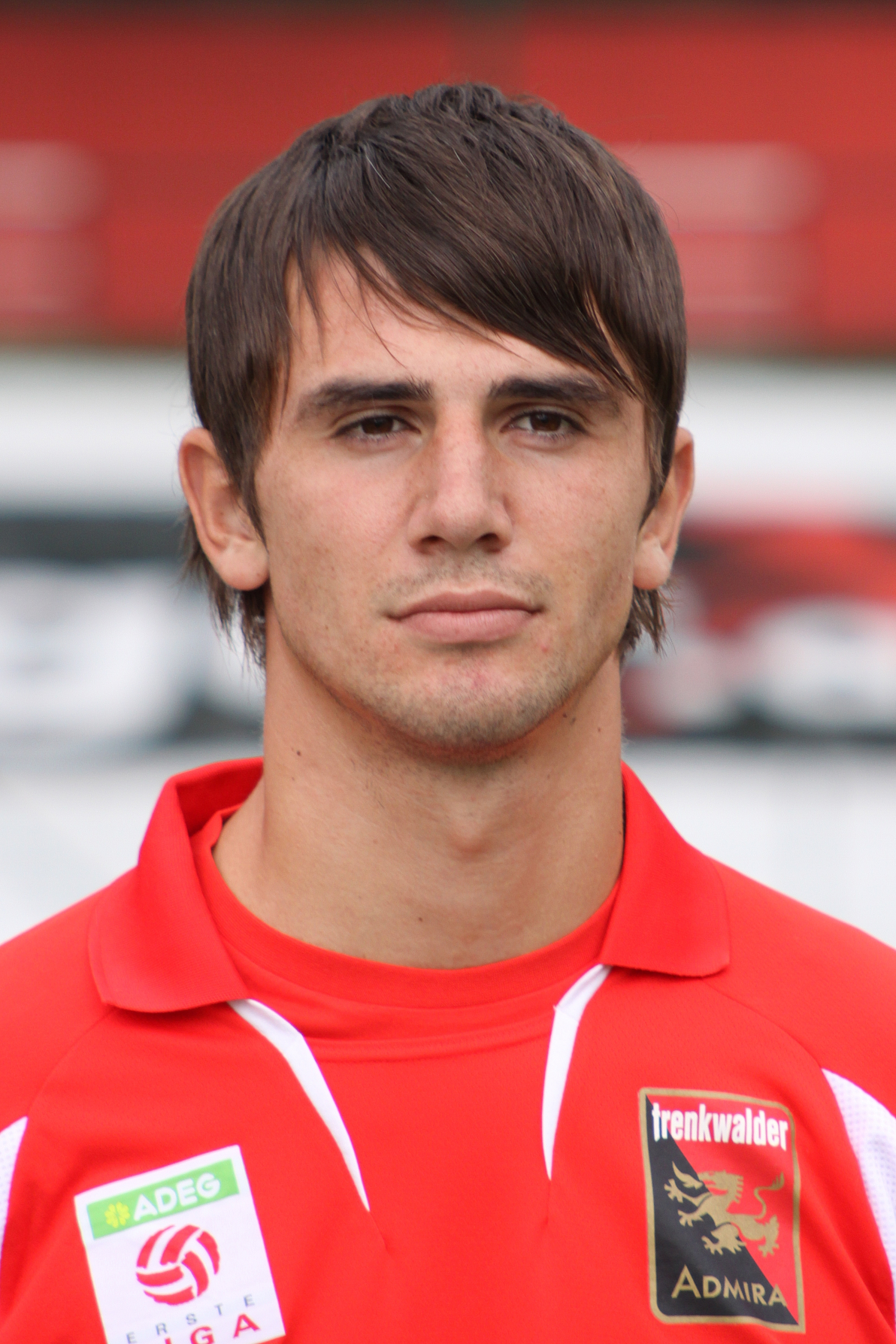

Personal information
- Date of birth: 21 June 1988 (age 38)
- Place of birth: Gračanica, SR Bosnia and Herzegovina, Yugoslavia
- Height: 1.93 m (6 ft 4 in)
- Position: Striker

Team information
- Current team: KAC 1909

Senior career*
Years	Team	Apps	(Gls)
2007–2008	Kärnten	19	(10)
2009–2011	Admira (A)	36	(24)
2009–2011	Admira	32	(8)
2011–2014	Wolfsberger AC	47	(15)
2014–2016	Shakhter Karagandy	51	(16)
2016	Rheindorf Altach	6	(0)
2016	Rheindorf Altach II	1	(1)
2016–2018	Wolfsberger AC	35	(3)
2018–2020	Sūduva	45	(25)
2021–2023	Osijek	32	(4)
2024–	KAC 1909	8	(6)
- * Club domestic league appearances and goals as of 11 May 2024

Mihret Topčagić (born 21 June 1988) is a Bosnian professional footballer who plays as a striker for the Austrian club KAC 1909 in the fourth-tier Kärntner Liga. He began playing football in 1994, in Austria.

== Club career ==
On 19 January 2016, Topčagić returned to Austria, signing for Rheindorf Altach on an 18-month contract.

A big forward, he joined FK Sūduva in summer 2018. In January 2021, he moved to Croatian top-tier side NK Osijek.

== Career statistics ==
=== Club ===
As of match played 1 April 2017

Appearances and goals by club, season and competition
Club	Season	League			National Cup		League Cup		Continental		Other		Total	
Club	Season	Division	Apps	Goals	Apps	Goals	Apps	Goals	Apps	Goals	Apps	Goals	Apps	Goals
Wolfsberger AC	2012–13	Austrian Football Bundesliga	31	10	2	1	-		-		-		33	11
Wolfsberger AC	2013–14	Austrian Football Bundesliga	16	5	2	1	-		-		-		18	6
Wolfsberger AC	Total		47	15	4	2	-	-	-	-	-	-	51	15
Shakhter Karagandy	2014	Kazakhstan Premier League	25	10	4	1	-		6	3	1	0	36	14
Shakhter Karagandy	2015	Kazakhstan Premier League	26	6	1	0	-		-		-		27	6
Shakhter Karagandy	Total		51	16	5	1	-	-	6	3	1	0	63	20
Rheindorf Altach	2015–16	Austrian Football Bundesliga	6	0	0	0	–		–		–		6	0
Rheindorf Altach II	2015–16	Austrian Regional League	1	1	0	0	–		–		–		1	1
Wolfsberger AC	2016–17	Austrian Football Bundesliga	17	2	0	0	–		–		–		17	2
Career total			122	34	9	3	-	-	6	3	1	0	138	38
