= Goran Cvetković =

Serbian footballer

Personal information
- Full name: Goran Cvetković
- Date of birth: 9 December 1982 (age 43)
- Place of birth: Prizren, SFR Yugoslavia
- Height: 1.76 m (5 ft 9 in)
- Position: Central midfielder

Senior career*
| Years | Team | Apps | (Gls) |
| 2001–2004 | Poštar Beograd | | |
| 2002–2003 | → Dorćol (loan) | 1 | (0) |
| 2004–2005 | BPI Pekar | 24 | (1) |
| 2005 | Gloria Bistrița | 4 | (0) |
| 2006–2008 | Javor Ivanjica | 11 | (1) |
| 2007 | → BPI Slavija (loan) | 14 | (1) |
| 2007–2008 | → Šumadija Jagnjilo (loan) | 27 | (5) |
| 2008–2009 | Šumadija Jagnjilo | 25 | (2) |
| 2009–2011 | Zemun | 59 | (6) |
| 2011 | Inđija | 16 | (2) |
| 2012 | Sunkar | 23 | (0) |
| 2013 | Kolubara | 27 | (2) |
| 2014 | Dolina Padina | 12 | (1) |
| 2014 | Zemun | | |
| 2015–2017 | Žarkovo | | |
- * Club domestic league appearances and goals

Goran Cvetković (Serbian Cyrillic: Горан Цветковић; born 9 December 1982) is a Serbian retired football midfielder.

He previously played with many Serbian clubs, ACF Gloria Bistrița in Romanian top-level league and FC Sunkar in Kazakhstan Premier League.
