= Sandro (footballer, born March 1983) =

Brazilian footballer

Personal information
- Full name: Sandro Luiz da Silva
- Date of birth: 13 March 1983 (age 43)
- Place of birth: Paranaguá, Brazil
- Height: 1.84 m (6 ft 0 in)
- Position: Centre-back

Senior career*
Years	Team	Apps	(Gls)
2006–2017	Toledo		
2008	Grêmio Inhumense		
2008–2009	Leixões	11	(0)
2009–2010	Olhanense	16	(0)
2010–2011	Penafiel	23	(0)
2011–2012	Santa Clara	24	(2)
2012	Atyrau	4	(0)
2013–2014	Santa Clara	33	(1)
2014–2017	Mafra	63	(3)
2017–2018	Oriental	6	(0)
2018–?	Real	33	(1)
- * Club domestic league appearances and goals as of 00:13, 29 October 2019 (UTC)

Sandro Luiz da Silva or simply Sandro (born 13 March 1983) is a Brazilian former professional footballer who played as a centre-back.
