= Ulan Konysbayev =

Kazakhstani footballer

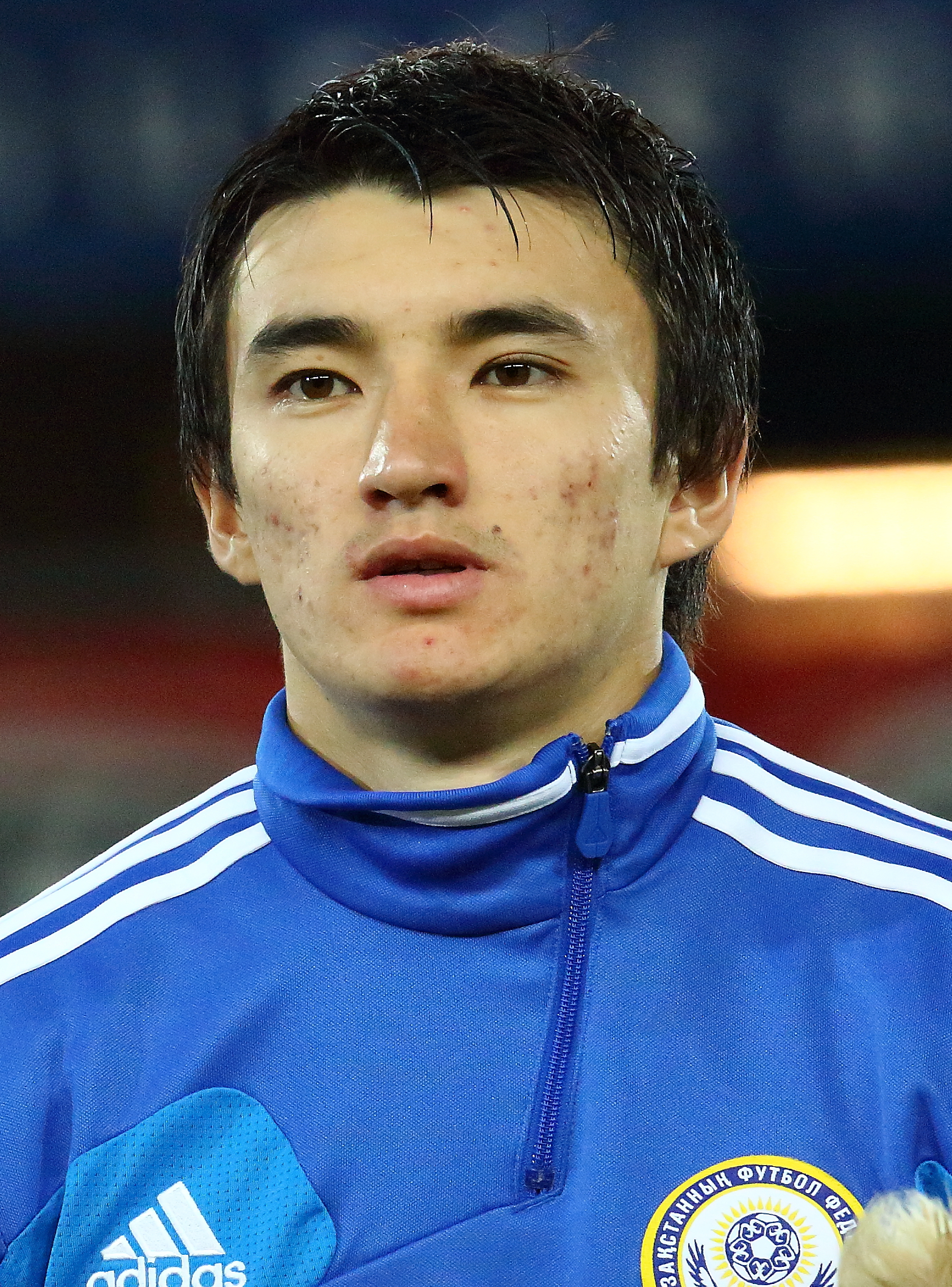
- Ulan Konysbayev during the match against Austria on 16 October 2012.

Personal information
- Full name: Ulan Abirbekuly Konysbayev
- Date of birth: 28 May 1989 (age 37)
- Place of birth: Ust-Kamenogorsk, Kazakh SSR, Soviet Union
- Height: 1.75 m (5 ft 9 in)
- Position: Attacking midfielder

Team information
- Current team: Taraz
- Number: 7

Youth career
- Taraz

Senior career*
Years	Team	Apps	(Gls)
2006–2007	Zhambyl	42	(5)
2008–2010	Taraz	82	(14)
2011–2013	Astana	65	(11)
2011	→ Shakhter Karagandy (loan)	11	(1)
2013–2014	Shakhter Karagandy	19	(4)
2015	Astana	8	(0)
2015	→ Kairat (loan)	6	(0)
2016	Atyrau	13	(0)
2018	Aktobe	12	(0)
2019	Okzhetpes	3	(0)
2021	Taraz	1	(0)
2026–	Taraz	1	(0)

International career^{‡}
2008–2010	Kazakhstan U21	4	(2)
2011–	Kazakhstan	32	(3)
- * Club domestic league appearances and goals as of 7 November 2026 ‡ National team caps and goals as of 13 November 2014

Ulan Abirbekuly Konysbayev (Kazakh: Ұлан Әбірбекұлы Қонысбаев, Ūlan Äbırbekūly Qonysbaev; born 28 May 1989) is a Kazakh footballer who plays for Taraz in the Kazakhstan First League.

== Career ==
Konysbayev began his career in 2006 with FC Zhambyl. Konysbayev left FC Shakhter Karagandy at the end of the 2014 season.

In February 2016, Konysbayev signed for FC Atyrau.

== Career statistics ==
=== Club ===
As of match played 2 June 2016

Club	Season	League		Cup		Europe		Other		Total	
Club	Season	Apps	Goals	Apps	Goals	Apps	Goals	Apps	Goals	Apps	Goals
Zhambyl	2006	21	3	–		–		–		21	3
Zhambyl	2007	21	2	1	0	–		–		22	2
Zhambyl	Total	42	5	1	0	–	–	–	–	43	5
Taraz	2008	24	7	–		–		–		24	7
Taraz	2009	26	4	3	0	–		–		29	4
Taraz	2010	32	3	2	0	–		–		34	3
Taraz	Total	82	14	5	0	–	–	–	–	87	14
Astana	2011	10	3	1	0	–		1	0	12	3
Astana	Total	10	3	1	0	–	–	1	0	12	3
Shakhter Karagandy (loan)	2011	11	1	–		4	2	–		15	3
Shakhter Karagandy (loan)	Total	11	1	–	–	4	2	–	–	15	3
Astana	2012	25	3	5	0	–		–		30	3
Astana	2013	30	5	2	1	2	0	1	0	35	6
Astana	Total	55	8	7	1	2	0	1	0	65	9
Shakhter Karagandy	2014	19	4	1	0	4	2	1	0	25	6
Shakhter Karagandy	Total	19	4	1	0	4	2	1	0	25	6
Astana	2015	12	0	1	0	0	0	1	0	14	0
Astana	Total	12	0	1	0	0	0	1	0	14	0
Kairat	2015	6	0	1	0	2	0	–		9	0
Kairat	Total	6	0	1	0	2	0	0	0	9	0
Atyrau	2016	13	0	0	0	–		–		13	0
Atyrau	Total	13	0	0	0	-	-	-	-	13	0
Career totals		250	35	17	1	12	4	4	0	283	40

=== International ===
As of match played 16 November 2014.

National team	Year	Apps	Goals
Kazakhstan	2011	6	1
Kazakhstan	2012	5	0
Kazakhstan	2013	4	0
Kazakhstan	2014	5	2
Total		20	3

==== International goals ====
#	Date	Venue	Opponent	Score	Result	Competition
1	2 September 2011	Turk Telekom Arena, Istanbul, Turkey	Turkey	1–1	1–2	UEFA Euro 2012 qualification
2	12 August 2014	Central Stadium, Almaty, Kazakhstan	Tajikistan	2–1	2–1	Friendly
3	5 September 2014	Astana Arena, Astana, Kazakhstan	Kyrgyzstan	6–1	7–1	Friendly

== Honours ==
=== Club ===
Astana

- Kazakhstan Cup (1): 2012
- Kazakhstan Super Cup (2): 2011, 2015

Shakhter Karagandy

- Kazakhstan Premier League (1): 2011

=== Individual ===
- Kazakhstani Footballer of the Year: 2011
