= Maksat Bayzhanov =

Kazakh professional footballer

Personal information
- Full name: Maksat Duysenbekuly Bayzhanov
- Date of birth: 6 August 1984 (age 42)
- Place of birth: Kyzylorda, Kazakhstan
- Height: 1.76 m (5 ft 9 in)
- Position: Midfielder

Senior career*
Years	Team	Apps	(Gls)
2002–2004	Kaisar	55	(2)
2005	Irtysh	19	(0)
2006–2008	Kaisar	83	(17)
2009	Lokomotiv Astana	19	(0)
2010	Aktobe	3	(0)
2010	Zhetysu	13	(1)
2011–2014	Shakhter Karagandy	104	(9)
2015	Atyrau	26	(5)
2016	Shakhter Karagandy	32	(3)
2017–2019	Kaisar	72	(7)
2020	Atyrau	7	(4)
2021–2022	Kaisar	46	(5)

International career
2004	Kazakhstan U-21	2	(0)
2005–2017	Kazakhstan	31	(1)
- * Club domestic league appearances and goals

Maksat Duysenbekuly Bayzhanov (Kazakh: Мақсат Дүйсенбекұлы Байжанов) is a Kazakh former professional footballer who played as a midfielder.

== Career ==
Bayzhanov is mostly known as former captain and leader of FC Kaisar. In February 2015, Bayzhanov signed for FC Atyrau, before returning to FC Shakhter Karagandy in January 2016.

On 21 February 2020, FC Atyrau announced the return of Bayzhanov. He returned to FC Kaisar in March 2021.

== Career statistics ==
=== Club ===
As of match played 10 November 2019

Appearances and goals by club, season and competition
Club	Season	League			National Cup		Continental		Other		Total	
Club	Season	Division	Apps	Goals	Apps	Goals	Apps	Goals	Apps	Goals	Apps	Goals
Kaisar	2002	Kazakhstan Premier League	2	0			-		-		2	0
Kaisar	2003	Kazakhstan Premier League	28	2			-		-		28	2
Kaisar	2004	Kazakhstan Premier League	25	0			-		-		25	0
Kaisar	Total		55	2			-	-	-	-	55	2
Irtysh Pavlodar	2005	Kazakhstan Premier League	19	0			-		-		19	0
Kaisar	2006	Kazakhstan Premier League	26	5			-		-		26	5
Kaisar	2007	Kazakhstan Premier League	29	2			-		-		29	2
Kaisar	2008	Kazakhstan Premier League	28	10			-		-		28	10
Kaisar	Total		83	17			-	-	-	-	83	17
Lokomotiv Astana	2009	Kazakhstan Premier League	19	0			-		-		19	0
Aktobe	2010	Kazakhstan Premier League	3	0			0	0	1	0	4	0
Zhetysu	2010	Kazakhstan Premier League	13	1			-		-		13	1
Shakhter Karagandy	2011	Kazakhstan Premier League	28	2			4	0	-		0	0
Shakhter Karagandy	2012	Kazakhstan Premier League	24	5	5	0	2	0	1	0	0	0
Shakhter Karagandy	2013	Kazakhstan Premier League	28	0	5	0	9	1	1	0	0	0
Shakhter Karagandy	2014	Kazakhstan Premier League	24	2	3	0	4	0	1	0	0	0
Shakhter Karagandy	Total		104	9	0	0	0	0	0	0	0	0
Atyrau	2015	Kazakhstan Premier League	26	5	0	0	-		-		26	5
Shakhter Karagandy	2016	Kazakhstan Premier League	32	3	1	0	-		-		33	3
Kaisar	2017	Kazakhstan Premier League	31	5	0	0	-		-		31	5
Kaisar	2018	Kazakhstan Premier League	22	1	1	0	-		-		23	1
Kaisar	2019	Kazakhstan Premier League	19	1	2	0	-		-		21	1
Kaisar	Total		72	7	3	0	-	-	-	-	75	7
Career total			426	44	17	0	19	1	4	0	466	45

=== International ===
Kazakhstan national team
Year	Apps	Goals
2005	6	0
2006	1	0
2007	0	0
2008	3	0
2009	1	0
2010	0	0
2011	2	0
2012	0	0
2013	6	0
2014	1	0
Total	20	0

Statistics accurate as of match played 5 March 2014

=== International goals ===
Scores and results list Kazakhstan's goal tally first.

Goal	Date	Venue	Opponent	Score	Result	Competition
1.	26 March 2016	Gloria Golf Resort Pitch A, Belek, Turkey	Azerbaijan	1–0	1–0	Friendly

== Honours ==
Shakhter Karagandy

- Kazakhstan Premier League (2): 2011, 2012

== Interesting facts ==
His name translates from Kazakh as goal, target, purpose.
