= Dimitrija Lazarevski =

Macedonian footballer

Personal information
- Full name: Dimitrija Lazarevski
- Date of birth: 23 September 1982 (age 44)
- Place of birth: Skopje, SFR Yugoslavia
- Height: 1.78 m (5 ft 10 in)
- Position: Left back

Senior career*
Years	Team	Apps	(Gls)
2001–2005	Rabotnički	54	(1)
2005	Zemun	9	(0)
2006	Makedonija	3	(0)
2006	Kamen Ingrad	3	(0)
2007	Renova		
2007–2008	Rabotnički	21	(0)
2008–2009	Dender	6	(0)
2009–2010	Metalurg Skopje	20	(0)
2010–2011	Besa Kavaje	29	(1)
2011–2012	Rabotnički	14	(0)
2012–2013	Astana	26	(0)
2013–2014	Vardar	28	(2)
2014–2017	Shkupi		

International career^{‡}
1999	Macedonia U16	3	(0)
2001–2003	Macedonia U18	2	(0)
2001–2003	Macedonia U21	5	(0)
- * Club domestic league appearances and goals as of 14 February 2012 ‡ National team caps and goals as of 14 February 2012

Dimitrija Lazarevski (Macedonian: Димитрија Лазаревски, born 23 September 1982) is a Macedonian retired footballer who played as a defender.

== Club career ==
He previously played with Serbian side FK Zemun, Croatian NK Kamen Ingrad, Belgian FCV Dender EH, and other Macedonian clubs such as FK Makedonija Gjorče Petrov, FK Renova and FK Rabotnički Kometal.

== International career ==
Lazarevski represented Macedonia in U-16, U-18 and U-21 levels.
