= Nemanja Džodžo =

Serbian footballer

Personal information
- Full name: Nemanja Džodžo
- Date of birth: 12 December 1986 (age 39)
- Place of birth: Novi Sad, SR Serbia, SFR Yugoslavia
- Height: 1.99 m (6 ft 6 in)
- Position: Goalkeeper

Youth career
- Sartid Smederevo

Senior career*
Years	Team	Apps	(Gls)
2004–2005	Milan Valjevo	20	(0)
2005–2006	Budućnost Valjevo	30	(0)
2006–2010	BSK Borča	73	(0)
2011	Charleroi	4	(0)
2012	Kaisar	17	(0)
2013–2014	Irtysh Pavlodar	14	(0)
Total		158	(0)

Managerial career
- 2016–2019: Mladost Novi Sad
- * Club domestic league appearances and goals

Nemanja Džodžo (Serbian Cyrillic: Немања Џоџо; born 12 December 1986) is a Serbian former professional footballer who played as a goalkeeper.

== Playing career ==
Džodžo made a name for himself at BSK Borča. He also played professionally abroad in Belgium and Kazakhstan.

== Managerial career ==
Džodžo began his managerial career at Mladost Novi Sad in early 2016, spending three and a half years in charge.
