= Sergei Ostapenko =

Kazakhstani footballer

Personal information
- Full name: Sergei Sergeyevich Ostapenko
- Date of birth: 23 February 1986 (age 40)
- Place of birth: Almaty, Kazakh SSR, Soviet Union
- Height: 1.90 m (6 ft 3 in)
- Position: Forward

Youth career
- FC Almaty

Senior career*
Years	Team	Apps	(Gls)
2003−2006	Almaty	98	(21)
2007	Tobol	26	(10)
2008	Royal Antwerp	0	(0)
2008	Almaty	19	(6)
2009	Aktobe	9	(0)
2010	Astana	27	(6)
2011	Zhetysu	32	(5)
2012–2014	Astana	55	(10)
2014	Kaisar	11	(0)
2015	Astana	2	(0)
Total		279	(56)

International career^{‡}
2004	Kazakhstan U-19	5	(1)
2004–2007	Kazakhstan U-21	4	(1)
2007−2014	Kazakhstan	42	(6)
- * Club domestic league appearances and goals as of 13 April 2015 ‡ National team caps and goals as of 4 August 2018

Sergei Sergeyevich Ostapenko (Russian: Серге́й Остапенко) (born 23 February 1986) is a Kazakh former footballer, whose last team was FC Astana.

== Career ==
In 2003, Ostapenko had graduated from FC Almaty (FC Tsesna at that time) football academy and had been starting in the first team since then, before his transfer to FC Tobol in 2007. That was definitely an upward move in his career. He helped the team to win the Intertoto Cup that season, to finish second in the Super League and win the Kazakhstan Cup.

=== Royal Antwerp ===
On 31 January 2008, along with Maksim Zhalmagambetov, Ostapenko signed a two-year contract with Royal Antwerp FC. The Belgian team's manager noted that the duo's youth, international experience and physical characteristics were key motivations for signing the pair. However, Ostapenko's European adventure was not particularly successful and he did not start a single game for the reds, only playing in the reserve team. Both Ostapenko and Maksim Zhalmagambetov shortly returned to Kazakhstan in the middle of the Kazakhstan Premier League 2008.

In July 2014, Ostapenko moved from FC Astana to FC Kaisar, returning to Astana in April 2015 after his Kaisar contract had expired.

=== International career ===
At the age of 21, Sergei earned his first cap on 6 June 2007 in a Euro 2008 qualifier against Azerbaijan. He scored his first goal for the national team against Armenia, which also was a lone winning goal. Since then, he has scored 3 more goals, all in World Cup Qualifiers, including 2 at home to Andorra.

== Career stats ==
=== Club ===
Last update: 21 September 2014

Season	Team	Country	League	Level	Apps	Goals
2003	Almaty	Kazakhstan	First Division	2	16	9
2004	Almaty	Kazakhstan	Premier League	1	32	4
2005	Almaty	Kazakhstan	Premier League	1	26	7
2006	Almaty	Kazakhstan	Premier League	1	24	1
2007	Tobol	Kazakhstan	Premier League	1	26	10
2007-08	Royal Antwerp	Belgium	Second Division	2	0	0
2008	Almaty	Kazakhstan	Premier League	1	19	4
2009	Aktobe	Kazakhstan	Premier League	1	9	0
2010	Astana	Kazakhstan	Premier League	1	27	6
2011	Zhetysu	Kazakhstan	Premier League	1	32	5
2012	Astana	Kazakhstan	Premier League	1	26	6
2013	Astana	Kazakhstan	Premier League	1	22	4
2014	Astana	Kazakhstan	Premier League	1	7	0
2014	Kaisar	Kazakhstan	Premier League	1	11	0
			Total		277	56

== International goals ==
#	Date	Venue	Opponent	Result	Score	Competition
1	21 November 2007	Hanrapetakan Stadium, Yerevan	Armenia	Won	1-0	Euro 2008 qualifying
2	20 August 2008	Almaty Central Stadium, Almaty	Andorra	Won	3-0	2010 World Cup qualification
3	20 August 2008	Almaty Central Stadium, Almaty	Andorra	Won	3-0	2010 World Cup qualification
4	6 September 2008	Almaty Central Stadium, Almaty	Ukraine	Lost	3-1	2010 World Cup qualification
5	9 February 2011	Atatürk Stadium, Antalya	Belarus	Draw	1-1	Friendly
6	6 September 2011	Tofiq Bahramov Stadium, Baku	Azerbaijan	Lost	3-2	Euro 2012 qualifying
Correct as of 13 January 2017

== Honours ==
- Kazakhstan League Runner-up: 2007
- Kazakhstan Cup Winner: 2006, 2007, 2010
- Intertoto Cup Winner: 2007
