= Gediminas Vičius =

Lithuanian footballer

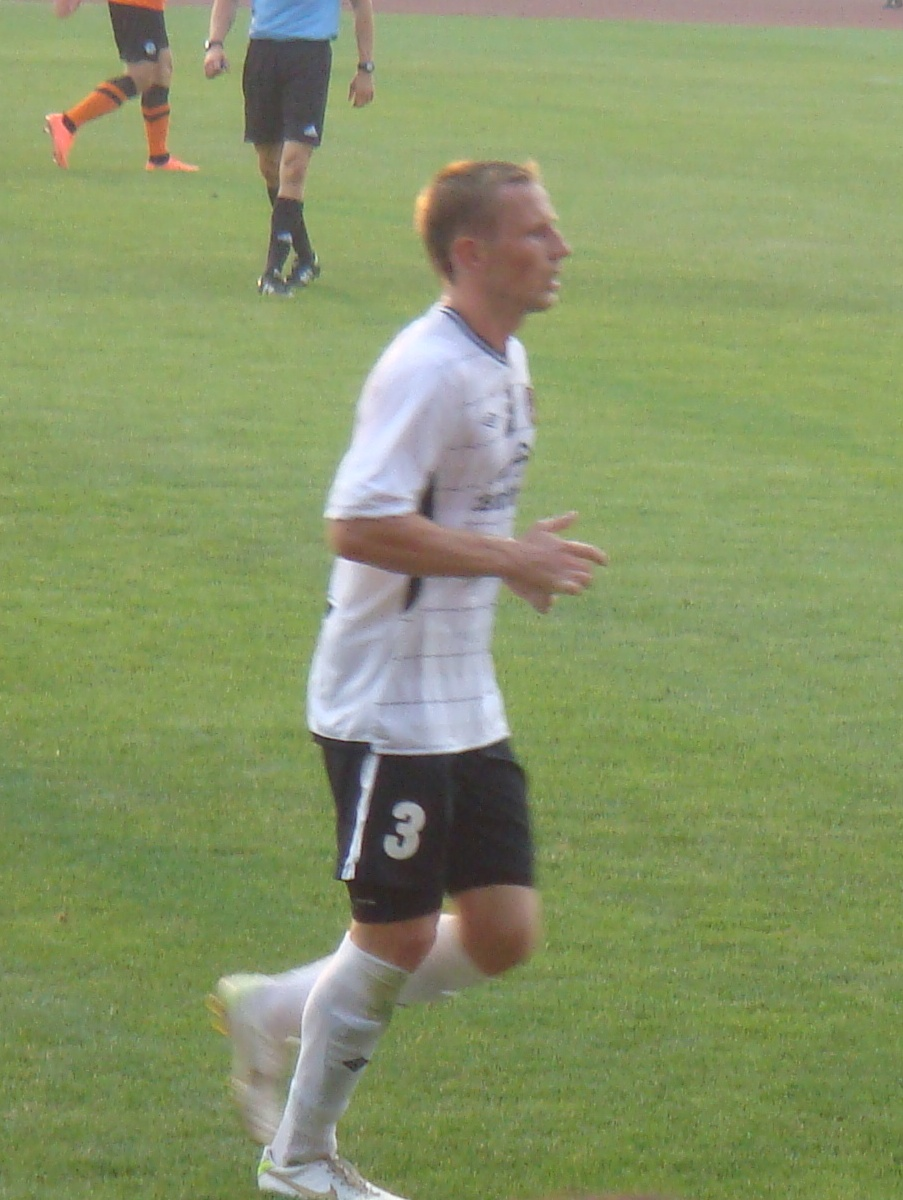

Personal information
- Full name: Gediminas Vičius
- Date of birth: 5 July 1985 (age 41)
- Place of birth: Kaunas, Soviet Union
- Height: 1.89 m (6 ft 2 1/2 in)
- Position: Midfielder

Team information
- Current team: Vilniaus Vytis

Senior career*
Years	Team	Apps	(Gls)
2003–2004	Kauno Jėgeriai	19	(8)
2005–2008	FK Šilutė	69	(8)
2008–2009	FBK Kaunas	10	(15)
2010–2014	Shakhter Karagandy	125	(19)
2015	Zhetysu	8	(0)
2016–	Vilniaus Vytis	24	(6)

International career
2011–2015	Lithuania	18	(1)
- * Club domestic league appearances and goals as of 2 July 2015

Gediminas Vičius (born 5 July 1985 in Kaunas) is a Lithuanian footballer who plays as a midfielder, currently for FC Vilniaus Vytis in the I Lyga and the Lithuania national football team.

== Career ==
=== Club ===
In 2005, he signed for Lithuanian outfit FK Šilutė where he made 69 appearances scoring 8 goals over 4 seasons.

During the 2008 season he transferred to the famous A Lyga club FBK Kaunas. He played there for two seasons and managed to make 2 appearances in the UEFA Europa League.

In 2010, he transferred to Kazakhstan Premier League club Shakhter Karagandy where he has since featured regularly in the league and in European club competition.

On 18 February 2015, Vičius signed for FC Zhetysu.

=== International ===
On 11 October 2011, he made his debut for the Lithuania national football team in a UEFA Euro 2012 qualifying Group I match against the Czech Republic.

== Career statistics ==
=== International ===
Lithuania
Year	Apps	Goals
2011	1	0
2012	5	0
2013	4	0
2014	7	1
2015	1	0
Total	18	1

Statistics accurate as of match played 14 June 2015

=== International goals ===
Scores and results list Lithuania's goal tally first.

No.	Date	Venue	Opponent	Score	Result	Competition
1	5 March 2014	Mardan Sports Complex, Antalya, Turkey	Kazakhstan	1–0	1–1	Friendly
