= Aleksandr Kirov =

Kazakhstani footballer (born 1984)

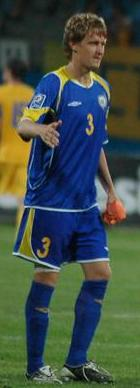

Personal information
- Full name: Aleksandr Sergeyevich Kirov
- Date of birth: 4 September 1984 (age 42)
- Place of birth: Astana, Kazakh SSR
- Height: 1.82 m (6 ft 0 in)
- Position: Left back

Senior career*
Years	Team	Apps	(Gls)
2002	CSKA Almaty	20	(0)
2003	Caspiy	18	(0)
2004	Sunkar	24	(3)
2005	Vostok	21	(0)
2006–2008	Almaty	79	(1)
2009	Aktobe	6	(0)
2009	Atyrau	11	(2)
2010–2011	Lokomotiv Astana	39	(3)
2011–2012	Shakhter Karagandy	35	(0)
2013	Astana	15	(0)
2014	Shakhter Karagandy	14	(0)
2015	Zhetysu	14	(0)
2015	Kokand 1912	0	(0)
2016	Irtysh Pavlodar	0	(0)
2016	Taraz	13	(1)

International career^{‡}
2005–2006	Kazakhstan U-21	8	(0)
2008–2013	Kazakhstan	29	(0)
- * Club domestic league appearances and goals as of 16 January 2018 ‡ National team caps and goals as of 16 January 2018

Aleksandr Kirov (Алекса́ндр Серге́евич Ки́ров; born 4 September 1984) is a retired Kazakh footballer who primarily played left back.

== Career statistics ==
=== International ===
Kazakhstan national team
Year	Apps	Goals
2008	1	0
2009	6	0
2010	5	0
2011	6	0
2012	7	0
2013	4	0
Total	29	0

Statistics accurate as of match played 4 June 2013
