= 2010 Commonwealth of Independent States Cup =

CIS Cup, Кубок Содружества 2010

Tournament details
- Host country: Russia
- Dates: 16–24 January 2010
- Teams: 16
- Venue: 2 (in 1 host city)

Final positions
- Champions: (Russia) Rubin Kazan (1st title)

Tournament statistics
- Matches played: 31
- Goals scored: 91 (2.94 per match)
- Top scorer(s): (Kyrgyzstan) Emil Kenzhesariyev (6 goals)

2010 Commonwealth of Independent States Cup was the eighteenth edition of the competition between the champions of former republics of Soviet Union. It was won by Rubin Kazan for the first time.

== Participants ==
Team	Qualification	Participation
(Russia) Rubin Kazan	2009 Russian Premier League champions ^{1}	2nd
(Ukraine) Dynamo Kyiv	2008–09 Ukrainian Premier League champions ^{2}	11th
(Belarus) Dnepr Mogilev	2009 Belarusian Premier League 3rd team ^{3}	2nd
(Lithuania) Ekranas Panevėžys	2009 A Lyga champions	3rd
(Latvia) Liepājas Metalurgs	2009 Latvian Higher League champions	2nd
(Estonia) Levadia Tallinn	2009 Meistriliiga champions	7th
(Moldova) Dacia Chișinău	2008–09 Moldovan National Division runners-up ^{4}	1st
(Armenia) Pyunik Yerevan	2009 Armenian Premier League champions ^{5}	8th
(Azerbaijan) Baku	2008–09 Azerbaijan Premier League champions	2nd
(Kazakhstan) Aktobe	2009 Kazakhstan Premier League champions	5th
(Uzbekistan) Bunyodkor Tashkent	2009 Uzbek League champions ^{6}	1st
(Tajikistan) Vakhsh Qurghonteppa	2009 Tajik League champions	3rd
(Turkmenistan) HTTU Aşgabat	2009 Ýokary Liga champions	3rd
(Kyrgyzstan) Dordoi-Dynamo Naryn	2009 Kyrgyzstan League champions	6th
(Finland) HJK Helsinki	2009 Veikkausliiga champions ^{7}	1st
Russia XI	Unofficial entry, not eligible to advance past group stage	2nd

- ^{1} Rubin Kazan were represented by reserve players.
- ^{2} Dynamo Kyiv were represented by a reserve team Dynamo-2 Kyiv.
- ^{3} Dnepr Mogilev replaced BATE Borisov (2009 Belarusian champions), who declined to participate.
- ^{4} Dacia Chișinău replaced Sheriff Tiraspol (2008–09 Moldovan champions), who declined to participate.
- ^{5} Pyunik Yerevan were represented by reserve and trial players.
- ^{6} Bunyodkor Tashkent were represented by reserve players.
- ^{7} HJK Helsinki invited by the organizing committee to replace (Georgia (country)) WIT Georgia Tbilisi (2008–09 Georgian champions), who declined to participate along with other Georgian teams due to the Russo-Georgian War.

== Group stage ==
=== Group A ===
Team	Pld	W	D	L	GF	GA	GD	Pts
(Russia) Rubin Kazan	3	2	0	1	4	2	+2	6
(Belarus) Dnepr Mogilev	3	2	0	1	8	6	+2	6
(Latvia) Liepājas Metalurgs	3	1	1	1	5	5	0	4
(Kyrgyzstan) Dordoi-Dynamo Naryn	3	0	1	2	2	6	−4	1

==== Results ====
16 January 2010
19:00

Rubin Kazan (Russia)	0 – 1	(Latvia) Liepājas Metalurgs
		Kuzņecovs 27'

Olympic Sport Complex, Moscow
Referee: Vladimir Pettay (Russia)
16 January 2010
19:00

Dnepr Mogilev (Belarus)	3 – 1	(Kyrgyzstan) Dordoi-Dynamo Naryn
Turlin 18'; Černych 26'; Lyasyuk 41'		Dmitri Shikurin 48'

Dynamo Manage, Moscow
Referee: Aleksandr Kolobaev (Russia)

17 January 2010
19:00

Dordoi-Dynamo Naryn (Kyrgyzstan)	0 – 2	(Russia) Rubin Kazan
		Dyadyun 26'; Mirzaev 75'

Olympic Sport Complex, Moscow
Referee: Vyacheslav Popov (Russia)
17 January 2010
19:00

Dnepr Mogilev (Belarus)	4 – 3	(Latvia) Liepājas Metalurgs
Lyasyuk 7', 66'; Černych 60'; Karpovich 89'		Rakels 39'; Kapaw 45' (o.g.); Grebis 87' (pen.)

Dynamo Manage, Moscow
Referee: Stanislav Sukhina (Russia)

19 January 2010
19:00

Rubin Kazan (Russia)	2 – 1	(Belarus) Dnepr Mogilev
Kukharchuk 18'; Kotlyarov 48'		Lyasyuk 31'

Olympic Sport Complex, Moscow
Referee: Sergei Karasev (Russia)
19 January 2010
19:00

Liepājas Metalurgs (Latvia)	1 – 1	(Kyrgyzstan) Dordoi-Dynamo Naryn
Kalns 23'		Aleksandr Mysikov 83'

Dynamo Manage, Moscow
Referee: Yuri Baskakov (Russia)

=== Group B ===
Team	Pld	W	D	L	GF	GA	GD	Pts
(Kazakhstan) Aktobe	3	2	0	1	4	1	+3	6
(Finland) HJK Helsinki	3	1	2	0	2	1	+1	5
(Azerbaijan) Baku	3	1	1	1	2	2	0	4
(Tajikistan) Vakhsh Qurghonteppa	3	0	1	2	1	5	−4	1

==== Results ====
16 January 2010
13:00

Aktobe (Kazakhstan)	0 – 1	(Finland) HJK Helsinki
		Santala 57'

Olympic Sport Complex, Moscow
Referee: Vladimir Kazmenko (Russia)
16 January 2010
13:00

Vakhsh Qurghonteppa (Tajikistan)	0 – 2	(Azerbaijan) Baku
		Fábio Luís 40'; Ahmadov 52'

Dynamo Manage, Moscow
Referee: Almir Kayumov (Russia)

17 January 2010
13:00

Baku (Azerbaijan)	0 – 0	(Finland) HJK Helsinki

Olympic Sport Complex, Moscow
Referee: Ildus Biglov (Russia)
17 January 2010
13:00

Aktobe (Kazakhstan)	2 – 0	(Tajikistan) Vakhsh Qurghonteppa
Kenzhesariyev 39', 47'

Dynamo Manage, Moscow
Referee: Aleksei Nikolaev (Russia)

19 January 2010
13:00

Aktobe (Kazakhstan)	2 – 0	(Azerbaijan) Baku
Golovskoy 24'; Averchenko 54'

Olympic Sport Complex, Moscow
Referee: Alexei Kovalev (Russia)
19 January 2010
13:00

HJK Helsinki (Finland)	1 – 1	(Tajikistan) Vakhsh Qurghonteppa
Parikka 42'		Usmonov 10'

Dynamo Manage, Moscow
Referee: Eduard Malyi (Russia)

=== Group C ===
- Unofficial table

Team	Pld	W	D	L	GF	GA	GD	Pts
(Ukraine) Dynamo Kyiv	3	3	0	0	6	2	+4	9
Russia XI	3	1	1	1	5	4	+1	4
(Turkmenistan) HTTU Aşgabat	3	1	0	2	7	9	−2	3
(Estonia) Levadia Tallinn	3	0	1	2	2	5	−3	1

- Official table

Team	Pld	W	D	L	GF	GA	GD	Pts
(Ukraine) Dynamo Kyiv	2	2	0	0	5	2	+3	6
(Turkmenistan) HTTU Aşgabat	2	1	0	1	5	5	0	3
(Estonia) Levadia Tallinn	2	0	0	2	1	4	−3	0

==== Results ====
16 January 2010
15:00

Dynamo Kyiv (Ukraine)	1 – 0	Russia XI
Dopilka 60'

Olympic Sport Complex, Moscow
Referee: Sergei Karasev (Russia)
16 January 2010
15:00

Levadia Tallinn (Estonia)	1 – 3	(Turkmenistan) HTTU Aşgabat
Gussev 68'		Şamyradow 2' (pen.), 52' (pen.); Allanazarow 75'

Dynamo Manage, Moscow
Referee: Alexei Kovalev (Russia)

17 January 2010
15:00

Levadia Tallinn (Estonia)	0 – 1	(Ukraine) Dynamo Kyiv
		Koval 9'

Olympic Sport Complex, Moscow
Referee: Vyacheslav Kharlamov (Russia)
17 January 2010
15:00

HTTU Aşgabat (Turkmenistan)	2 – 4	Russia XI
Kuçerenkow 21'; Şamyradow 90'		Grigoryev 10', 50'; Sapeta 13'; Maslov 89'

Dynamo Manage, Moscow
Referee: Maksim Layushkin (Russia)

19 January 2010
15:00

HTTU Aşgabat (Turkmenistan)	2 – 4	(Ukraine) Dynamo Kyiv
Gazakow 17'; Söýünow 82'		Sakhnevych 5'; Novak 19'; Koval 80'; Morozenko 87'

Olympic Sport Complex, Moscow
Referee: Evgeny Turbin (Russia)
19 January 2010
15:00

Russia XI	1 – 1	(Estonia) Levadia Tallinn
Maslov 56'		Nahk 43' (pen.)

Dynamo Manage, Moscow
Referee: Vladimir Pettay (Russia)

=== Group D ===
Team	Pld	W	D	L	GF	GA	GD	Pts
(Uzbekistan) Bunyodkor Tashkent	3	2	1	0	6	4	+2	7
(Lithuania) Ekranas Panevėžys	3	1	2	0	4	2	+2	5
(Moldova) Dacia Chișinău	3	1	1	1	6	2	+4	4
(Armenia) Pyunik Yerevan	3	0	0	3	3	11	−8	0

==== Results ====
16 January 2010
17:00

Ekranas Panevėžys (Lithuania)	2 – 0	(Armenia) Pyunik Yerevan
Sasnauskas 29'; Galkevičius 58'

Olympic Sport Complex, Moscow
Referee: Eduard Malyi (Russia)
16 January 2010
17:00

Dacia Chișinău (Moldova)	0 – 1	(Uzbekistan) Bunyodkor Tashkent
		Nasimov 86'

Dynamo Manage, Moscow
Referee: Aleksandr Gvardis (Russia)

17 January 2010
17:00

Dacia Chișinău (Moldova)	0 – 0	(Lithuania) Ekranas Panevėžys

Olympic Sport Complex, Moscow
Referee: Aleksei Eskov (Russia)
17 January 2010
17:00

Pyunik Yerevan (Armenia)	2 – 3	(Uzbekistan) Bunyodkor Tashkent
Panchenko 7'; Denis Shchuchkin 61'		Nasimov 14', 83'; Raimqulov 34'

Dynamo Manage, Moscow
Referee: Vladislav Bezborodov (Russia)

19 January 2010
17:00

Pyunik Yerevan (Armenia)	1 – 6	(Moldova) Dacia Chișinău
Egbeta 58'		Bugaiov 17', 28', 78', 87' (pen.), 90'; Gorceac 36'

Olympic Sport Complex, Moscow
Referee: Almir Kayumov (Russia)
19 January 2010
17:00

Bunyodkor Tashkent (Uzbekistan)	2 – 2	(Lithuania) Ekranas Panevėžys
Nasimov 30', 34'		Galkevičius 43'; Rimkus 73'

Dynamo Manage, Moscow
Referee: Vladimir Kazmenko (Russia)

== Final rounds ==
=== Bracket ===
Quarter-finals (20 Jan)
(Uzbekistan)	Bunyodkor Tashkent	1
(Turkmenistan)	HTTU Aşgabat (p)	1
(Russia)	Rubin Kazan	2
(Finland)	HJK Helsinki	1
(Kazakhstan)	Aktobe	3
(Belarus)	Dnepr Mogilev	1
(Ukraine)	Dynamo Kyiv	0
(Lithuania)	Ekranas Panevėžys	1

Semi-finals (22 Jan)
(Turkmenistan)	HTTU Aşgabat	0
(Russia)	Rubin Kazan	4
(Kazakhstan)	Aktobe	3
(Lithuania)	Ekranas Panevėžys	0

Final (24 Jan)
(Russia)	Rubin Kazan	5
(Kazakhstan)	Aktobe	2

=== Quarter-finals ===
20 January 2010
13:00

Bunyodkor Tashkent (Uzbekistan)	1 – 1	(Turkmenistan) HTTU Aşgabat
Kuzin 72'		Şamyradow 45'
Penalties
Boydullayev (penalty missed); Yunusov (penalty scored); Khvostunov (penalty scored); Mandzukas (penalty missed)	2 – 4	(penalty scored) Baýramow; (penalty scored) Garajaýew; (penalty scored) Allanazarow; (penalty scored) Şamyradow

Olympic Sport Complex, Moscow
Referee: Aleksandr Gvardis (Russia)
20 January 2010
15:00

Aktobe (Kazakhstan)	3 – 1	(Belarus) Dnepr Mogilev
Essomba 14'; Golovskoy 20'; Kenzhesariyev 61'		Bychanok 25'

Olympic Sport Complex, Moscow
Referee: Vladislav Bezborodov (Russia)
20 January 2010
17:00

Dynamo Kyiv (Ukraine)	0 – 1	(Lithuania) Ekranas Panevėžys
		Rimkus 90'

Olympic Sport Complex, Moscow
Referee: Maksim Layushkin (Russia)
20 January 2010
19:00

Rubin Kazan (Russia)	2 – 1	(Finland) HJK Helsinki
Mirzaev 11'; Yarkin 82'		Medo 52'

Olympic Sport Complex, Moscow
Referee: Aleksei Nikolaev (Russia)

=== Semi-finals ===
22 January 2010
16:00

Aktobe (Kazakhstan)	3 – 0	(Lithuania) Ekranas Panevėžys
Kenzhesariyev 55', 78'; Golovskoy 81'

Olympic Sport Complex, Moscow
Referee: Aleksandr Kolobaev (Russia)
22 January 2010
19:00

HTTU Aşgabat (Turkmenistan)	0 – 4	(Russia) Rubin Kazan
		Portnyagin 14'; Yarkin 28'; Afonin 35'; Kukharchuk 58'

Olympic Sport Complex, Moscow
Referee: Yuri Baskakov (Russia)

=== Final ===
24 January 2010
14:00

Rubin Kazan (Russia)	5 – 2	(Kazakhstan) Aktobe
Portnyagin 4', 61' (pen.); Zhestokov 40'; Yarkin 45'; Kotlyarov 86'		Essomba 12'; Kenzhesariyev 49'

Olympic Sport Complex, Moscow
Referee: Stanislav Sukhina (Russia)

== Top scorers ==
Rank	Player	Team	Goals
1	(Kyrgyzstan) Emil Kenzhesariyev	(Kazakhstan) Aktobe	6
2	(Uzbekistan) Bahodir Nasimov	(Uzbekistan) Bunyodkor Tashkent	5
2	(Moldova) Igor Bugaiov	(Moldova) Dacia Chișinău	5
4	(Turkmenistan) Berdi Şamyradow	(Turkmenistan) HTTU Aşgabat	4
4	(Belarus) Andrey Lyasyuk	(Belarus) Dnepr Mogilev	4
6	(Russia) Igor Portnyagin	(Russia) Rubin Kazan	3
6	(Russia) Aleksandr Yarkin	(Russia) Rubin Kazan	3
6	(Russia) Konstantin Golovskoy	(Kazakhstan) Aktobe	3
