= Didar Sydykbek =

Kazakhstani footballer

Personal information
- Full name: Didar Sydykbek
- Date of birth: 6 February 1993 (age 33)
- Place of birth: Kazakhstan
- Height: 1.69 m (5 ft 7 in)
- Position: Right winger

Team information
- Current team: Astana-64
- Number: 33

Senior career*
Years	Team	Apps	(Gls)
2009–2010	Kyzylzhar	1	(0)
2011–2014	Astana-64	60	(13)
2013	→ Aktobe (loan)	1	(0)
2013	→ Ordabasy (loan)	6	(0)
2014	→ Bayterek (loan)	16	(4)

International career^{‡}
2011	Kazakhstan U19	5	(1)
2013	Kazakhstan U21	1	(0)
- * Club domestic league appearances and goals as of 6 March 2015 ‡ National team caps and goals as of 6 March 2015

Didar Sydykbek (Kazakh: Дидар Сыдыкбек; born 6 February 1993) is a Kazakh footballer who plays as a midfielder for Astana-64 in the Kazakhstan First Division. Didar also played in Kazakhstan Premier League and for the Kazakhstan U21 and U19 national teams.

== Career ==
At the age of 16 Didar was in Kazakhstan Premier League side Kyzylzhar's squad in 2009. At the age of 18 he became a main squad player for Astana-64 in Kazakhstan First Division where he scored 13 goals in 53 games during 2 seasons. Following this, being recognized as one of the best young players in the division, Didar was loaned to the Kazakhstan Premier League sides Aktobe and Ordabasy where he made his debut in the top division of Kazakh football at the age of 20. After the 2014 season he went on trial with Polish Wisła Kraków.

== Career statistics ==
As of 6 March 2015.

Club	Season	League		Cup		Europe		Total	
Club	Season	Apps	Goals	Apps	Goals	Apps	Goals	Apps	Goals
Kyzylzhar	2009	0	0	0	0	–		0	0
Kyzylzhar	2010	1	0	0	0	–		1	0
Astana-64	2011	23	7	1	0	-		24	7
Astana-64	2012	30	6	1	0	–		31	6
Aktobe (loan)	2013	1	0	0	0	-		1	0
Ordabasy (loan)	2013	6	0	0	0	-		6	0
Astana-64	2014	7	0	2	0	-		9	0
Bayterek (loan)	2014	16	4	-		-		16	4
Career totals		84	17	4	0	-	-	88	17
