= 2013 FC Aktobe season =

FC Aktobe
2013 season
- Chairman: Sagat Yensegenuly
- Manager: Vladimir Nikitenko
- Stadium: Central Stadium
- Kazakhstan Premier League: 1st
- Kazakhstan Cup: Semifinal
- Europa League: Play-off Round vs Dynamo Kyiv
- Top goalscorer: League: Marat Khairullin (7); All: Marat Khairullin (10)
Home colours	Away colours

The 2013 FC Aktobe season was the 13th successive season that the club played in the Kazakhstan Premier League, the highest tier of association football in Kazakhstan. Aktobe won the League title for the first time since 2009, qualifying for the UEFA Champions League. Aktobe also reached the Semifinal of the Kazakhstan Cup and the Play-off Round of the Europa League.

== Squad ==
Note: Flags indicate national team as defined under FIFA eligibility rules; some limited exceptions apply. Players may hold more than one non-FIFA nationality.

No.	Pos.	Nation	Player
3	DF	KAZ	Aleksei Muldarov
4	MF	RUS	Andrei Kharabara
5	DF	UKR	Petr Badlo (captain)
7	DF	KAZ	Dmitri Miroshnichenko
8	FW	RUS	Sergei Davydov (on loan from Rubin Kazan)
10	FW	KAZ	Marat Khairullin
12	DF	TTO	Robert Primus
13	MF	KAZ	Yevgeniy Dyadenko
14	FW	KAZ	Sergey Gridin
16	DF	ARM	Robert Arzumanyan
17	MF	KAZ	Askhat Tagybergen
19	FW	KAZ	Sergei Lisenkov

No.	Pos.	Nation	Player
20	DF	KGZ	Emil Kenzhesariev
22	DF	KAZ	Sanat Shalekenov
23	DF	KAZ	Yuriy Logvinenko
34	GK	KAZ	Zhasur Narzikulov
35	GK	KAZ	Stanislav Pavlov
39	MF	MDA	Serghei Covalciuc
50	FW	UZB	Alexander Geynrikh
55	GK	KAZ	Andrei Sidelnikov
80	MF	UZB	Timur Kapadze
88	MF	KAZ	Alexandr Volf
89	DF	KAZ	Aldan Baltayev
95	FW	KAZ	Abat Aimbetov

== Transfers ==
=== Winter ===
In: Note: Flags indicate national team as defined under FIFA eligibility rules; some limited exceptions apply. Players may hold more than one non-FIFA nationality.

No.	Pos.	Nation	Player
3	DF	KAZ	Aleksei Muldarov (from (Russia) Mordovia Saransk)
4	MF	RUS	Andrei Kharabara (from (Kazakhstan) Sunkar)
9	MF	KGZ	Anton Zemlianukhin (from (Turkey) Giresunspor, previously on loan)
14	FW	KAZ	Sergey Gridin (from (Kazakhstan) Astana)
16	DF	ARM	Robert Arzumanyan (from (Russia) SKA-Khabarovsk)

Out: Note: Flags indicate national team as defined under FIFA eligibility rules; some limited exceptions apply. Players may hold more than one non-FIFA nationality.

No.	Pos.	Nation	Player
9	MF	CZE	Lukáš Bajer (to (Czech Republic) Viktoria Žižkov)
28	MF	LTU	Arūnas Klimavičius (to (Kazakhstan) Zhetysu)

=== Summer ===
In: Note: Flags indicate national team as defined under FIFA eligibility rules; some limited exceptions apply. Players may hold more than one non-FIFA nationality.

No.	Pos.	Nation	Player
8	FW	RUS	Sergei Davydov (loan from (Russia) Rubin Kazan)

Out: Note: Flags indicate national team as defined under FIFA eligibility rules; some limited exceptions apply. Players may hold more than one non-FIFA nationality.

No.	Pos.	Nation	Player
9	MF	KGZ	Anton Zemlianukhin (to (Kazakhstan) Kairat)
75	MF	UZB	Marat Bikmaev

== Competitions ==
=== Kazakhstan Premier League ===
==== First round ====
===== Results summary =====
Overall								Home						Away					
Pld	W	D	L	GF	GA	GD	Pts	W	D	L	GF	GA	GD	W	D	L	GF	GA	GD
22	14	5	3	30	12	+18	47	8	2	1	20	7	+13	6	3	2	10	5	+5

Last updated: 4 August 2013.
Source: Results

===== Results by round =====
Round	1	2	3	4	5	6	7	8	9	10	11	12	13	14	15	16	17	18	19	20	21	22
Ground	A	H	A	A	H	A	H	A	H	A	H	A	H	H	A	H	A	H	A	H	A	H
Result	W	W	D	D	D	W	W	W	W	L	W	W	W	W	D	W	W	W	L	D	W	L
Position																						

Source: Results
A = Away; H = Home; W = Win; D = Draw; L = Loss

===== Results =====
9 March 2013 1	Vostok	0 – 1	Aktobe	Oskemen
15:00 (UTC+6)	Niang (yellow card) 5'; D.Shmidt (yellow card) 47'; Sohna (yellow card) 60'; Aliyev (yellow card) 74'	Summary	Arzumanyan (yellow card) 14'; Zemlianukhin (yellow card) 23'; Logvinenko 80'; Bikmaev (yellow card) 90'	Stadium: Vostok Stadium; Attendance: 1,200; Referee: Anatolyi Vishnichenko

15 March 2013 2	Aktobe	3 – 1	Shakhter Karagandy	Aktobe
16:00 (UTC+6)	Bikmaev (yellow card) 17'; Miroshnichenko (yellow card) 18' (yellow-red card) 39'; Geynrikh 37', 75' (yellow card) 63'; Khairullin 58' (pen.)	Summary	Cañas 15'; Malyi (red card) 30'; Simčević (yellow card) 41'; Finonchenko (yellow card) 63'; Paryvayew (yellow card) 72'; S.Lunin (yellow card) 81'	Stadium: Central Stadium; Attendance: 3,000; Referee: Ruslan Duzmambetov

30 March 2013 3	Akzhayik	1 – 1	Aktobe	Oral
15:00 (UTC+6)	Sadjo 34'; R.Khairov (yellow card) 67'; Černý (yellow card) 85'	Summary	P.Badlo 36'	Stadium: Petr Atoyan Stadium; Attendance: 5,500; Referee: Igor Aleshin

6 April 2013 4	Irtysh Pavlodar	0 – 0	Aktobe	Pavlodar
15:00 (UTC+6)	Chichulin (yellow card) 25'; Mukhutdinov (yellow card) 33' (yellow-red card) 55'; A.Dauletkhanov (yellow card) 45'; Chernyshov (yellow card) 61'	Summary	Muldarov (yellow card) 34'; Bikmaev (yellow card) 45+1'; Geynrikh (yellow card) 80'; Sidelnikov (yellow card) 90+4'	Stadium: Central Stadium; Attendance: 5,500; Referee: Aleksandr Gauzer

14 April 2013 5	Aktobe	1 – 1	Zhetysu	Aktobe
17:00 (UTC+6)	Zemlianukhin 34'; Tagybergen (yellow card) 45+2'; Muldarov (yellow card) 73'	Summary	Melziddinov (yellow card) 16'; Shchotkin 31'; Salomov (yellow card) 50'	Stadium: Central Stadium; Attendance: 3,000; Referee: Sergey Gorokhovodatskiy

20 April 2013 6	Astana	1 – 2	Aktobe	Astana
17:00 (UTC+6)	Beisebekov (yellow card) 47'; Ostapenko 60' (yellow card) 80'; Shakhmetov (yellow card) 67'	Summary	Arzumanyan (yellow card) 16'; Kharabara 35' (yellow card) 73'; P.Badlo (yellow card) 37'; Miroshnichenko 77'	Stadium: Astana Arena; Attendance: 6,500; Referee: Viktor Antonov

24 April 2013 7	Aktobe	3 – 0	Atyrau	Aktobe
18:00 (UTC+6)	Gridin (yellow card) 21'; Kharabara 45+2'; Miroshnichenko 83'; Khairullin 86'	Summary	A.Nurybekov (yellow card) 9'; Rodionov (yellow card) 10'	Stadium: Central Stadium; Attendance: 3,000; Referee: Askhat Abdanbayev

28 April 2013 8	Taraz	0 – 1	Aktobe	Taraz
17:00 (UTC+6)	M.Muminov (yellow card) 57'	Summary	P.Badlo (yellow card) 75' (goal) 90'	Stadium: Central Stadium; Attendance: 5,000; Referee: Akmalkhan Kholmatov

5 May 2013 9	Aktobe	1 – 0	Tobol	Aktobe
15:00 (UTC+6)	Khairullin 38'; Geynrikh (yellow card) 65'	Summary	Bugaiov (yellow card) 62'; Tonev (yellow card) 79'	Stadium: Central Stadium; Attendance: 8,000; Referee: Igor Khisamutdinov

11 May 2013 10	Kairat	1 – 0	Aktobe	Almaty
17:00 (UTC+6)	T.Baizhanov (yellow card) 7'; O.Nedashkovsky 47'	Summary	Muldarov (yellow card) 13'; Kharabara (yellow card) 31'; Geynrikh (yellow card) 82'; Khairullin (yellow card) 90+2'	Stadium: Central Stadium; Attendance: 11,000; Referee: Ruslan Duzmambetov

18 May 2013 11	Aktobe	1 – 0	Ordabasy	Aktobe
19:00 (UTC+6)	Logvinenko 23'; Kenzhesariyev (yellow card) 40'	Summary	B.Kozhabayev (yellow card) 10'; Mwesigwa (yellow card) 49'; Nurgaliev (yellow card) 77'	Stadium: Central Stadium; Attendance: 8,000; Referee: BolatKarlibayev

22 May 2013 12	Shakhter Karagandy	1 – 2	Aktobe	Karaganda
18:30 (UTC+6)	Đidić (yellow card) 23'; Tarasov (yellow card) 46'; Tazhimbetov (yellow card) 65'; Cañas (yellow card) 75'; Višņakovs 80'	Summary	Geynrikh 2', 49' (yellow card) 43'; Primus (yellow card) 66'; Kharabara (yellow card) 90+2'	Stadium: Shakhter Stadium; Attendance: 5,000; Referee: Igor Aleshin

26 May 2013 13	Aktobe	2 – 0	Akzhayik	Aktobe
20:00 (UTC+6)	Covalciuc 14'; Muldarov (yellow card) 80'; Gridin 82'	Summary		Stadium: Central Stadium; Attendance: 10,000; Referee: Igor Chesnokov

30 May 2013 14	Aktobe	3 – 0	Irtysh Pavlodar	Aktobe
20:00 (UTC+6)	Arzumanyan 34'; P.Badlo (yellow card) 39'; Logvinenko 42'; Primus 62'; Gridin (yellow card) 74'	Summary	Shomko (yellow card) 48'; Chuchman (yellow card) 49'; Chernyshov (yellow card) 52'	Stadium: Central Stadium; Attendance: 10,000; Referee: Sergey Gorokhovodatskiy

14 June 2013 15	Zhetysu	0 – 0	Aktobe	Taldykorgan
19:00 (UTC+6)	Ergashev (yellow card) 13'	Summary		Stadium: Zhetysu Stadium; Attendance: 2,500; Referee: Igor Khisamutdinov

23 June 2013 16	Aktobe	2 – 1	Astana	Aktobe
20:00 (UTC+6)	Kapadze 15', 17'; Khairullin (yellow card) 58'; Sidelnikov (yellow card) 88'	Summary	Zelão (yellow card) 14'; Kuat 54'; Nusserbayev (yellow card) 70'	Stadium: Central Stadium; Attendance: 12,000; Referee: Ruslan Duzmambetov

29 June 2013 17	Atyrau	0 – 2	Aktobe	Atyrau
20:00 (UTC+6)	A.Nurybekov (yellow card) 3'; Rodionov (yellow card) 7'; Samchenko (yellow card) 27'; Kutsov (yellow card) 44' (red card) 57'; Injac (yellow card) 88'	Summary	Tagybergen (yellow card) 3'; Primus 36', 64'; Sidelnikov (yellow card) 84'	Stadium: Munaishy Stadium; Attendance: 2,000; Referee: Viktor Antonov

7 July 2013 18	Aktobe	3 – 2	Taraz	Aktobe
21:00 (UTC+6)	Logvinenko (yellow card) 22'; Khairullin 37'; Davydov 42' (pen.); P.Badlo (yellow card) 45'; Miroshnichenko (yellow card) 58'; Geynrikh 86'	Summary	Sergienko (yellow card) 8'; Odita 39'; Kuchma (yellow card) 41'; Vorotnikov 78'	Stadium: Central Stadium; Attendance: 10,000; Referee: Denis Tevyashov

14 July 2013 19	Tobol	1 – 0	Aktobe	Kostanay
19:00 (UTC+6)	Bugaiov 55' (pen.); A.Bekbaev (yellow card) 90'	Summary	Muldarov (yellow card) 88'	Stadium: Central Stadium; Attendance: 7,000; Referee: Akmalkhan Kholmatov

21 July 2013 20	Aktobe	1 – 1	Kairat	Aktobe
20:00 (UTC+6)	Khairullin 50'	Summary	Zemlianukhin 71'; Addo (yellow card) 90+4'	Stadium: Central Stadium; Attendance: 10,000; Referee: Igor Aleshin

28 July 2013 21	Ordabasy	0 – 1	Aktobe	Shymkent
18:30 (UTC+6)	Collins (yellow card) 72'; Mukhtarov (yellow card) 81'	Summary	Gridin 50'; Miroshnichenko (yellow card) 60'; Davydov (yellow card) 81'	Stadium: Kazhymukan Munaitpasov Stadium; Attendance: 5,000; Referee: Anatolyi Vishnichenko

4 August 2013 22	Aktobe	0 – 1	Vostok	Aktobe
20:00 (UTC+6)	Geynrikh (yellow card) 72'	Summary	Aliyev 36'; I.Bayteryakov (yellow card) 90+2'	Stadium: Central Stadium; Attendance: 8,000; Referee: Bolat Karlibayev

===== League table =====
Pos	Team	Pld	W	D	L	GF	GA	GD	Pts	Qualification
1	Aktobe	22	14	5	3	30	12	+18	47	Qualification for the championship round
2	Astana	22	12	5	5	35	24	+11	41	Qualification for the championship round
3	Shakhter Karagandy	22	10	5	7	31	23	+8	35	Qualification for the championship round
4	Irtysh Pavlodar	22	9	7	6	24	20	+4	34	Qualification for the championship round
5	Kairat	22	7	10	5	28	24	+4	31	Qualification for the championship round

Source: FFK (in Russian)
Rules for classification: 1st points;
Two team tiebreak: 1st overall wins; 2nd head-to-head record; 3rd goals difference; 4th goals scored; 5th away goals scored;
Multiple teams tiebreak: 1st overall wins; 2nd goals difference; 3rd goals scored; 4th away goals scored

==== Championship Round ====
===== Results summary =====
Overall								Home						Away					
Pld	W	D	L	GF	GA	GD	Pts	W	D	L	GF	GA	GD	W	D	L	GF	GA	GD
10	6	1	3	16	10	+6	19	4	1	0	13	3	+10	2	0	3	3	7	−4

Last updated: 18 November 2014.
Source: Results

===== Results by round =====
Round	1	2	3	4	5	6	7	8	9	10
Ground	A	H	A	A	H	A	H	H	A	H
Result	L	W	L	W	W	W	W	W	L	D
Position	1	1	2	2	1	1	1	1	1	1

Source: Results
A = Away; H = Home; W = Win; D = Draw; L = Loss

===== Results =====
17 August 2013 23	Ordabasy	2 – 1	Aktobe	Shymkent
17:30 (UTC+6)	Mwesigwa (yellow card) 11'; Junuzović (yellow card) 22' (goal) 68', 79'; Y.Levin (yellow card) 31'; Belić (yellow card) 77'	Summary	Y.Dyadenko (yellow card) 17'; Primus (yellow card) 22' (goal) 79'; Khairullin (yellow card) 29'; Kapadze (yellow card) 76'	Stadium: Kazhymukan Munaitpasov Stadium; Attendance: 4,000; Referee: Viktor Antonov

25 August 2013 24	Aktobe	2 – 0	Kairat	Aktobe
20:00 (UTC+6)	Geynrikh 21'; Muldarov (yellow card) 38'; Kapadze 77'	Summary	V.Li (yellow card) 68'; Shestakov (yellow card) 73'; Kukeyev (yellow card) 88'	Stadium: Central Stadium; Attendance: 10,000; Referee: Artyom Kuchin

1 September 2013 25	Irtysh Pavlodar	4 – 0	Aktobe	Pavlodar
19:00 (UTC+6)	Bakayev 10' (pen.); Chichulin 16'; Shomko 35'; Chernyshov 43'; G.Suyumbaev (yellow card) 71'	Summary	A.Baltayev (yellow card) 22'; Khairullin (yellow card) 45'	Stadium: Central Stadium; Attendance: 3,800; Referee: Ruslan Duzmambetov

14 September 2013 26	Shakhter Karagandy	0 – 1	Aktobe	Karaganda
17:00 (UTC+6)	Đidić (yellow card) 26'; Tarasov (yellow card) 76'	Summary	Gridin 61'; P.Badlo (yellow card) 63'	Stadium: Shakhter Stadium; Attendance: 6,500; Referee: Akmalkhan Kholmatov

21 September 2013 27	Aktobe	2 – 0	Astana	Aktobe
19:00 (UTC+6)	Geynrikh (yellow card) 27'; Kapadze 56'; Kharabara (yellow card) 80'; Aimbetov (yellow card) 88'; Khairullin 90+6'	Summary	Kéthévoama (yellow card) 20'; Dmitrenko (yellow card) 80'	Stadium: Central Stadium; Attendance: 8,000; Referee: Ruslan Duzmambetov

29 September 2013 28	Kairat	0 – 1	Aktobe	Almaty
18:00 (UTC+6)	Yedigaryan (yellow card) 19'	Summary	Muldarov (yellow card) 79'; P.Badlo 90+1' (yellow card) 90+1'	Stadium: Central Stadium; Attendance: 12,000; Referee: Igor Aleshin

5 October 2013 29	Aktobe	3 – 1	Irtysh Pavlodar	Aktobe
17:30 (UTC+6)	Davydov 45+1'; Arzumanyan 49'; Logvinenko (yellow card) 68'; Mukhutdinov 71' (o.g.); P.Badlo (yellow card) 72'; Sidelnikov (yellow card) 90+2'	Summary	Shomko 17'; Mukhutdinov (yellow card) 50'; Ivanov (yellow card) 72'	Stadium: Central Stadium; Attendance: 10,000; Referee: Bolat Karlibayev

19 October 2013 30	Aktobe	4 – 0	Shakhter Karagandy	Aktobe
17:00 (UTC+6)	Khairullin 13'; Tagybergen (yellow card) 30'; P.Badlo 50'; S.Lisenkov (yellow card) 71'; Aimbetov 84'; Kapadze 89'	Summary	Zyankovich (yellow card) 47'; D.Zverev (yellow card) 55'; M.Gabyshev (yellow card) 90+3'	Stadium: Central Stadium; Attendance: 10,000; Referee: Sergey Gorokhovodatskiy

27 October 2013 31	Astana	1 – 0	Aktobe	Astana
15:00 (UTC+6)	Twumasi 15'; Nusserbayev (yellow card) 53'; Akhmetov (yellow card) 76'; Zelão (yellow card) 84'; Korobkin (yellow card) 88'	Summary		Stadium: Astana Arena; Attendance: 9,000; Referee: Igor Khisamutdinov

2 November 2013 32	Aktobe	2 – 2	Ordabasy	Aktobe
16:00 (UTC+6)	Geynrikh (yellow card) 69'; Kapadze (yellow card) 76'; Logvinenko 83'; Aimbetov 90+1'	Summary	R.Pakholyuk 32'; Grigorenko (yellow card) 71'; Ashirbekov (yellow card) 76'; Y.Levin 87'	Stadium: Central Stadium; Attendance: 10,000; Referee: Akmalkhan Kholmatov

===== Table =====
Pos	Team	Pld	W	D	L	GF	GA	GD	Pts	Qualification
1	Aktobe (C)	32	20	6	6	46	22	+24	43	Qualification for the Champions League second qualifying round
2	Astana	32	19	5	8	54	35	+19	42	Qualification for the Europa League first qualifying round
3	Kairat	32	12	12	8	44	38	+6	33	Qualification for the Europa League first qualifying round
4	Irtysh Pavlodar	32	12	8	12	41	39	+2	27	
5	Shakhter Karagandy	32	12	7	13	43	45	−2	26	Qualification for the Europa League first qualifying round (Note: Shakter qualified for the 2014–15 UEFA Europa League first qualifying round by winning the 2013 Kazakhstan Cup.)
6	Ordabasy	32	11	8	13	33	34	−1	23	

Source: Soccerway
Rules for classification: 1st points;
Two team tiebreak: 1st overall wins; 2nd head-to-head record; 3rd goals difference; 4th goals scored; 5th away goals scored;
Multiple teams tiebreak: 1st overall wins; 2nd goals difference; 3rd goals scored; 4th away goals scored.
(C) Champions

=== Kazakhstan Cup ===
10 April 2013 First Round	Bayterek	1 – 9	Aktobe	Astana
(UTC+6)	Suleimenov (yellow card) 14'; Shaykhov 15'; Zhantleuov (yellow card) 70'; Aslan (yellow card) 85'	Report	Gridin 22' (pen.), 32', 83'; Logvinenko 26'; Tagybergen 30'; Bikmaev 63'; Suleimenov 64' (o.g.); Geynrikh 68'; Primus 74'	Stadium: Astana Arena; Attendance: 500; Referee: Hisamutdinov

1 May 2013 Second Round	Kyran	0 – 1	Aktobe	Shymkent
15:00 (UTC+6)	N.Zholdasov (yellow card) 10'; D.Shkarupa (yellow card) 30'	Summary	S.Lisenkov 30' (pen.) (yellow card) 81'; P.Badlo (yellow card) 44'	Stadium: Lokomotive Stadium; Attendance: 1,000; Referee: Denis Izmailov

19 June 2013 Quarterfinal	Aktobe	3 – 1 (a.e.t.)	Ordabasy	Aktobe
20:00 (UTC+6)	Gridin 48'; Geynrikh (yellow card) 90+2' (yellow-red card) 114'; Kapadze 95'; Sidelnikov (yellow card) 98'; Miroshnichenko (yellow card) 99'; Khairullin 117'	Summary	Y.Levin 1'; T.Adyrbekov (yellow card) 26'; Karpovich (yellow card) 28'; Collins (yellow card) 58'; B.Beisenov (yellow card) 98'	Stadium: Central Stadium; Attendance: 10,000; Referee: Anatolyi Vishnichenko

25 September 2013 Semifinal 1st leg	Taraz	0 – 0	Aktobe	Taraz
17:00 (UTC+6)	Diakate (yellow card) 64'; D.Yevstigneyev (yellow card) 68'; A.Shabaev (yellow card) 86'	Summary	Kharabara (yellow card) 40'; Muldarov (yellow card) 68'; Khairullin (yellow card) 88'; P.Badlo (yellow card) 90+4'	Stadium: Central Stadium; Attendance: 3,100; Referee: Artyom Kuchin

30 October 2013 Semifinal 2nd leg	Aktobe	0 – 1 (0 – 1 agg.)	Taraz	Aktobe
16:00 (UTC+6)	Y.Dyadenko (yellow card) 82'	Summary	Kozhamberdi (yellow card) 42'; Sergienko (yellow card) 54'; S.Bauyrzhan (yellow card) 78'; S.Shaff 90'	Stadium: Central Stadium; Attendance: 5,000; Referee: Viktor Antonov

=== UEFA Europa League ===
==== Qualifying rounds ====
4 July 2013 First Qualifying Round 1st leg	Gandzasar (Armenia)	1 – 2	(Kazakhstan) Aktobe	Yerevan, Armenia
21:00 (UTC+6)	A.Zakaryan (yellow card) 73'; Dashyan 90'	Report	Davydov 61'; Tagybergen 78'	Stadium: Republican Stadium; Attendance: 2,100; Referee: Daniel Stefański (Poland)

11 July 2013 First Qualifying Round 2nd leg	Aktobe (Kazakhstan)	2 – 1 (4 – 2 agg.)	(Armenia) Gandzasar	Aktobe, Kazakhstan
22:00 (UTC+6)	Kapadze 2', 54'; P.Badlo (yellow card) 22'; Logvinenko (yellow card) 27'; Geynrikh (yellow card) 79'	Report	N.Beglaryan 35'; A.Khachatryan (yellow card) 48'	Stadium: Aktobe Central Stadium; Attendance: 12,800; Referee: Nikola Dabanović (Montenegro)

18 July 2013 Second Qualifying Round 1st leg	Hødd (Norway)	1 – 0	(Kazakhstan) Aktobe	Ulsteinvik, Norway
23:00 (UTC+6)	Standal 28'; Aursnes (yellow card) 70'	Report	Logvinenko (yellow card) 50'	Stadium: Høddvoll Stadion; Attendance: 2,019; Referee: Stavros Tritsonis (Greece)

25 July 2013 Second Qualifying Round 2nd leg	Aktobe (Kazakhstan)	2 – 0 (2 – 1 agg.)	(Norway) Hødd	Aktobe, Kazakhstan
23:00 (UTC+6)	Davydov 5', 61'	Report	Aursnes (yellow card) 77'	Stadium: Aktobe Central Stadium; Attendance: 12,200; Referee: Mete Kalkavan (Turkey)

1 August 2013 Third Qualifying Round 1st leg	Aktobe (Kazakhstan)	1 – 0	(Iceland) Breiðablik	Aktobe, Kazakhstan
23:00 (UTC+6)	Arzumanyan (yellow card) 47'; Khairullin 90' (pen.); Primus (yellow card) 90+2'	Report	T.Hreidarsson (yellow card) 90'	Stadium: Aktobe Central Stadium; Attendance: 12,200; Referee: Libor Kovařík (Czech Republic)

9 August 2013 Third Qualifying Round 2nd leg	Breiðablik (Iceland)	1 – 0 (a.e.t.) (1 – 1 agg.) (1 – 2 p)	(Kazakhstan) Aktobe	Reykjavík, Iceland
01:00 (UTC+6)	Margeirsson 27'; E.Adalsteinsson (yellow card) 58'	Report	Covalciuc (yellow card) 27'; Muldarov (yellow card) 52'; S.Lisenkov (yellow card) 60'; Kharabara (yellow card) 65'	Stadium: Laugardalsvöllur; Attendance: 2,449; Referee: Sébastien Delferiere (Belgium)
	Penalties
	Ingason (penalty missed); Lýðsson (penalty missed); K. Jónsson (penalty missed); Rohde (penalty scored); Troost (penalty missed)		(penalty missed) Badlo; (penalty missed) Khairullin; (penalty scored) Kenzhesariev; (penalty scored) Kapadze

22 August 2013 Playoff Round 1st leg	Aktobe (Kazakhstan)	2 – 3	(Ukraine) Dynamo Kyiv	Aktobe, Kazakhstan
20:00 (UTC+6)	Trémoulinas 37' (o.g.); Khairullin 65'; Muldarov (yellow card) 68'; Primus (yellow card) 75'; Logvinenko (yellow card) 79'; Sidelnikov (yellow card) 79'	Report	Yarmolenko 16'; Haruna (yellow card) 33'; Dragović (yellow card) 49'; Ideye 52'; Belhanda 57' (yellow card) 79'; Lens (yellow card) 75'	Stadium: Aktobe Central Stadium; Attendance: 12,500; Referee: Aleksei Kulbakov (Belarus)

29 August 2013 Playoff Round 2nd leg	Dynamo Kyiv (Ukraine)	5 – 1 (8 – 3 agg.)	(Kazakhstan) Aktobe	Kyiv, Ukraine
23:00 (UTC+6)	Lens 9'; Bezus 30'; Mbokani 36'; Dragović (yellow card) 37'; Ideye 52' (pen.); Husyev 73'	Report	Geynrikh 37' (pen.); Muldarov (yellow card) 51'; P.Badlo (yellow card) 81'	Stadium: Olympic Stadium; Attendance: 70; Referee: Stephan Studer (Switzerland)

== Squad statistics ==
As of Match played 2 November 2013

=== Appearances and goals ===
No.	Pos	Nat	Player	Total		Premier League		Kazakhstan Cup		UEFA Europa League	
No.	Pos	Nat	Player	Apps	Goals	Apps	Goals	Apps	Goals	Apps	Goals
3	DF	(Kazakhstan) KAZ	Aleksei Muldarov	41	4	27+2	4	4	0	8	0
4	MF	(Russia) RUS	Andrei Kharabara	39	2	25+2	2	4	0	6+2	0
5	DF	(Ukraine) UKR	Petr Badlo	41	4	29+1	4	3	0	8	0
7	DF	(Kazakhstan) KAZ	Dmitri Miroshnichenko	24	2	20+2	2	1	0	0+1	0
8	FW	(Russia) RUS	Sergei Davydov	25	5	9+7	2	2	0	6+1	3
10	MF	(Kazakhstan) KAZ	Marat Khairullin	38	10	25+1	7	3+1	1	8	2
12	DF	(Trinidad and Tobago) TTO	Robert Primus	32	5	19+2	4	3	1	7+1	0
13	MF	(Kazakhstan) KAZ	Yevgeniy Dyadenko	12	0	7+2	0	2+1	0	0	0
14	FW	(Kazakhstan) KAZ	Sergey Gridin	32	7	9+15	3	2+1	4	0+5	0
16	DF	(Armenia) ARM	Robert Arzumanyan	28	2	20+1	2	3	0	4	0
17	MF	(Kazakhstan) KAZ	Askhat Tagybergen	33	2	9+13	0	5	1	3+3	1
19	FW	(Kazakhstan) KAZ	Sergei Lisenkov	18	1	0+12	0	1+1	1	1+3	0
20	DF	(Kyrgyzstan) KGZ	Emil Kenzhesariyev	19	0	9+3	0	0+1	0	5+1	0
22	DF	(Kazakhstan) KAZ	Sanat Shalekenov	8	0	0+4	0	2+2	0	0	0
23	DF	(Kazakhstan) KAZ	Yuriy Logvinenko	36	1	25+1	0	3+1	1	5+1	0
34	GK	(Kazakhstan) KAZ	Zhasur Narzikulov	6	0	4	0	2	0	0	0
39	MF	(Moldova) MDA	Serghei Covalciuc	30	1	16+4	1	2+1	0	6+1	0
50	FW	(Uzbekistan) UZB	Alexander Geynrikh	37	8	22+4	6	2+2	1	5+2	1
55	GK	(Kazakhstan) KAZ	Andrei Sidelnikov	39	0	28	0	3	0	8	0
80	MF	(Uzbekistan) UZB	Timur Kapadze	38	8	27+1	5	2+1	1	7	2
89	DF	(Kazakhstan) KAZ	Aldan Baltayev	14	0	5+4	0	1+1	0	2+1	0
95	FW	(Kazakhstan) KAZ	Abat Aimbetov	12	2	5+5	2	1+1	0	0	0
	MF	(Kazakhstan) KAZ	Alexander Ulshin	1	0	0	0	1	0	0	0
	FW	(Kazakhstan) KAZ	Didar Sydykbek	1	0	0+1	0	0	0	0	0
Players who appeared for Aktobe that left during the season:
9	MF	(Kyrgyzstan) KGZ	Anton Zemlianukhin	9	1	3+4	1	2	0	0	0
75	MF	(Uzbekistan) UZB	Marat Bikmaev	14	1	10+2	0	1+1	1	0	0

=== Goal scorers ===
Place	Position	Nation	Number	Name	Premier League	Kazakhstan Cup	UEFA Europa League	Total
1	MF	(Kazakhstan)	10	Marat Khairullin	7	1	2	10
2	FW	(Uzbekistan)	50	Alexander Geynrikh	6	1	1	8
2	MF	(Uzbekistan)	80	Timur Kapadze	5	1	2	8
4	FW	(Kazakhstan)	14	Sergey Gridin	3	4	0	7
5	DF	(Trinidad and Tobago)	12	Robert Primus	4	1	0	5
5	DF	(Kazakhstan)	23	Yuriy Logvinenko	4	1	0	5
5	FW	(Russia)	8	Sergei Davydov	2	0	3	5
8	DF	(Ukraine)	5	Petr Badlo	4	0	0	4
9				Own goal	1	1	1	3
10	DF	(Armenia)	16	Robert Arzumanyan	2	0	0	2
10	MF	(Russia)	4	Andrei Kharabara	2	0	0	2
10	DF	(Kazakhstan)	7	Dmitri Miroshnichenko	2	0	0	2
10	FW	(Kazakhstan)	95	Abat Aimbetov	2	0	0	2
10	MF	(Kazakhstan)	17	Askhat Tagybergen	0	1	1	2
15	MF	(Kyrgyzstan)	9	Anton Zemlianukhin	1	0	0	1
15	MF	(Moldova)	39	Serghei Covalciuc	1	0	0	1
15	MF	(Uzbekistan)	75	Marat Bikmaev	0	1	0	1
15	FW	(Kazakhstan)	19	Sergei Lisenkov	0	1	0	1
				TOTALS	46	13	10	69

=== Disciplinary record ===
Number	Nation	Position	Name	Premier League		Kazakhstan Cup		UEFA Europa League		Total	
Number	Nation	Position	Name	Yellow card	Red card	Yellow card	Red card	Yellow card	Red card	Yellow card	Red card
3	(Kazakhstan)	DF	Aleksei Muldarov	7	0	1	0	3	0	10	0
4	(Russia)	MF	Andrei Kharabara	4	0	1	0	1	0	6	0
5	(Ukraine)	DF	Petr Badlo	7	0	2	0	2	0	11	0
7	(Kazakhstan)	DF	Dmitri Miroshnichenko	4	1	1	0	0	0	5	1
8	(Russia)	FW	Sergei Davydov	1	0	0	0	0	0	1	0
10	(Kazakhstan)	MF	Marat Khairullin	4	0	1	0	0	0	5	0
12	(Trinidad and Tobago)	DF	Robert Primus	2	0	0	0	2	0	4	0
13	(Kazakhstan)	MF	Yevgeniy Dyadenko	1	0	1	0	0	0	2	0
14	(Kazakhstan)	FW	Sergey Gridin	3	0	0	0	0	0	3	0
16	(Armenia)	DF	Robert Arzumanyan	2	0	0	0	1	0	3	0
17	(Kazakhstan)	MF	Askhat Tagybergen	3	0	0	0	0	0	3	0
19	(Kazakhstan)	FW	Sergei Lisenkov	1	0	1	0	1	0	3	0
20	(Kyrgyzstan)	DF	Emil Kenzhesariyev	1	0	0	0	0	0	1	0
23	(Kazakhstan)	DF	Yuriy Logvinenko	2	0	0	0	3	0	5	0
39	(Moldova)	MF	Serghei Covalciuc	0	0	0	0	1	0	1	0
50	(Uzbekistan)	FW	Alexander Geynrikh	8	0	2	1	2	0	12	1
55	(Kazakhstan)	GK	Andrei Sidelnikov	4	0	1	0	1	0	6	0
80	(Uzbekistan)	MF	Timur Kapadze	2	0	0	0	0	0	2	0
89	(Kazakhstan)	DF	Aldan Baltayev	1	0	0	0	0	0	1	0
95	(Kazakhstan)	FW	Abat Aimbetov	1	0	0	0	0	0	1	0
Players who left Aktobe during the season:
9	(Kyrgyzstan)	MF	Anton Zemlianukhin	1	0	0	0	0	0	1	0
75	(Uzbekistan)	MF	Marat Bikmaev	3	0	0	0	0	0	3	0
			TOTALS	62	1	11	1	17	0	90	2
