= 2005–06 Rangers F.C. season =

Rangers
2005–06 season
- Chairman: David Murray
- Manager: Alex McLeish
- Ground: Ibrox Stadium
- Scottish Premier League: 3rd
- Scottish Cup: Fourth round
- League Cup: Quarter-finals
- Champions League: Round of 16
- Top goalscorer: League: Kris Boyd (17); All: Kris Boyd (20)
Home colours	Away colours	Third colours

The 2005–06 season was the 126th season of competitive football by Rangers.

== Overview ==
Rangers played a total of 52 competitive matches during the 2005–06 season. Their start to the season was poor, winning only six league games out of the first 17. The period from October through to early December saw the team embark on one of the worst runs in their history, going ten games without a win. The league form scarcely improved as they failed to catch Hearts and so finished third in the league.

The domestic cup competitions were not productive as the club went out of the League Cup at the quarter final stage to Celtic, losing 2–0 at Celtic Park. They lost 3–0 also at Ibrox to Hibernian on 4 February 2006 to go out of the Scottish Cup in the fourth round and end their last hope of silverware for the season.

Rangers did however qualify for the Champions League group stages, and a 1–1 draw with Internazionale saw Rangers progress to the last 16 for the first time in the club's history, and the first Scottish team to do so. They were then eliminated by Spanish side Villarreal on the away goals rule.

This season turned out to be the last for manager Alex McLeish, with his imminent departure at the end of the season being announced in February following the Scottish Cup exit and a 2–0 defeat away to Aberdeen in the league.

== Players ==
=== Squad information ===
N	Pos.	Nat.	Name	Age	Since	App	Goals	Ends	Transfer fee	Notes
1	GK	(Germany)	Stefan Klos	34	1998	296	0	2007	£0.7m	
2	DF	(Netherlands)	Fernando Ricksen	29	2000	254	20	2009	£3.75m	
3	DF	(France)	Olivier Bernard	26	2005	15	0	2007	Free	
3	DF	(England)	Michael Ball	26	2001	76	2	2006	£4m	left on 31 August
4	MF	(Belgium)	Thomas Buffel	25	2005 (Winter)	56	12	2009	£2.3m	
5	DF	(Trinidad and Tobago)	Marvin Andrews	30	2004	68	8	2007	Free	
6	MF	(Scotland)	Barry Ferguson (captain)	28	2005 (Winter)	301	43	2010	£4.5m	
7	MF	(Algeria)	Brahim Hemdani	28	2005	49	2	2009	Free	
8	MF	(Scotland)	Alex Rae	38	2004	44	1	2006	Free	
9	FW	(Croatia)	Dado Pršo	31	2004	87	33	2007	Free	
10	FW	(Spain)	Nacho Novo	27	2004	100	29	2008	£0.45m	
11	MF	(Scotland)	Gavin Rae	28	2004 (Winter)	19	2	2007	£0.25m	
12	DF	(Scotland)	Robert Malcolm	25	1997	115	3	2007	Youth system	
14	MF	(Serbia and Montenegro)	Dragan Mladenović	30	2004	9	0	2006	£1.1m	left on 31 August
14	DF	(Greece)	Sotirios Kyrgiakos	26	2005	57	5	2006	Free	
15	DF	(Georgia (country))	Zurab Khizanishvili	24	2003 (Winter)	63	0	2008	Free	left on 10 April
15	FW	(Italy)	Filippo Maniero	33	2005	0	0	2006	Free	left on 12 October
15	FW	(Scotland)	Kris Boyd	22	2006 (Winter)	21	20	2009	£0.4m	
16	DF	(France)	Julien Rodriguez	27	2005	30	1	2009	£1m	
17	MF	(Scotland)	Chris Burke	22	2000	79	8	2007	Youth system	
18	DF	(France)	José-Karl Pierre-Fanfan	30	2005	10	1	2008	Free	
19	FW	(Scotland)	Steven Thompson	22	2003 (Winter)	86	23	2006	£0.2m	left on 10 January
20	DF	(Scotland)	Maurice Ross	25	2000	108	3	2007	Youth system	left on 31 August
20	DF	(Scotland)	Alan Hutton	21	2002	68	3		Youth system	
21	FW	(England)	Francis Jeffers	25	2005	14	0	2006	Loan	
22	GK	(Scotland)	Allan McGregor	24	2001	11	0		Youth system	out on season loan
23	FW	(Argentina)	Federico Nieto	22	2005	6	3	2006	Loan	left on 1 January
24	DF	(Scotland)	Ian Murray	25	2005	42	0	2008	Free	
25	GK	(Netherlands)	Ronald Waterreus	35	2005 (Winter)	64	0	2006	£0.05m	
26	FW	(Denmark)	Peter Løvenkrands	26	2000	182	54	2006	£1.3m	
31	MF	(Tunisia)	Hamed Namouchi	22	2003	51	6	2008	Free	
34	DF	(Scotland)	Steven Smith	20	2002	24	0	2008	Youth system	
38	MF	(Scotland)	Charlie Adam	20	2003	3	0		Youth system	out on season loan
41	GK	(England)	Lee Robinson	19	2004	1	0	2009	Youth system	
44	FW	(Scotland)	Ross McCormack	19	2003	13	4		Youth system	
51	DF	(Scotland)	Alan Lowing	18	2004	4	0	2008	Youth system	
66	FW	(Antigua and Barbuda)	Moses Ashikodi	18	2006 (Winter)	1	0	2006	Free	

- Last updated: 7 May 2006
- Source: Players transfer, Wikipedia players' articles
- Ordered by position on pitch.

=== Transfers ===
==== In ====
Date	Player	From	Fee
9 June 2005	(Scotland) Ian Murray	(Scotland) Hibernian	Bosman
14 June 2005	(Algeria) Brahim Hemdani	(France) Marseille	Bosman
6 July 2005	(France) José-Karl Pierre-Fanfan	(France) Paris Saint-Germain	Bosman
8 July 2005	(Argentina) Federico Nieto	(Argentina) Almagro	Loan
11 July 2005	(France) Dany N'Guessan	(France) Auxerre	Free
4 August 2005	(France) Julien Rodriguez	(France) Monaco	£1,000,000
30 August 2005	(Greece) Sotirios Kyrgiakos	(Greece) Panathinaikos	Free
31 August 2005	(Italy) Filippo Maniero	(Italy) Torino	Free
31 August 2005	(France) Olivier Bernard	(England) Southampton	Free
31 August 2005	(England) Francis Jeffers	(England) Charlton Athletic	Loan
1 January 2006	(Scotland) Kris Boyd	(Scotland) Kilmarnock	£400,000
12 January 2006	(Antigua and Barbuda) Moses Ashikodi	(England) West Ham United	Free

==== Out ====
Date	Player	To	Fee
31 May 2005	(Sweden) Bojan Djordjic	(England) Plymouth Argyle	Free
6 June 2005	(Georgia (country)) Shota Arveladze	(Netherlands) AZ Alkmaar	Bosman
8 June 2005	(Scotland) Tom Brighton	(Scotland) Clyde	Free
8 June 2005	(Scotland) Graeme Smith	(Scotland) Motherwell	Free
8 June 2005	(Scotland) Alex Walker	(Scotland) Greenock Morton	Free
8 June 2005	(France) Warren Jacmot	(France) Lyon-Duchère	Free
4 August 2005	(Finland) Jukka Santala	(Scotland) Partick Thistle	Loan
13 August 2005	(Denmark) Bajram Fetai	(Denmark) Silkeborg	Nominal
29 August 2005	(Scotland) Allan McGregor	(Scotland) Dunfermline Athletic	Loan
31 August 2005	(England) Michael Ball	(Netherlands) PSV Eindhoven	Free
31 August 2005	(Serbia and Montenegro) Dragan Mladenović	(Serbia and Montenegro) Red Star Belgrade	Free
31 August 2005	(Scotland) Maurice Ross	(England) Sheffield Wednesday	Free
31 August 2005	(Georgia (country)) Zurab Khizanishvili	(England) Blackburn Rovers	Loan
31 August 2005	(Scotland) Charlie Adam	(Scotland) St Mirren	Loan
31 August 2005	(Scotland) Brian McLean	(Scotland) Motherwell	Loan
12 October 2005	(Italy) Filippo Maniero	Free Agent	Contract terminated
28 December 2005	(Argentina) Federico Nieto	(Argentina) Almagro	End of loan
10 January 2006	(Scotland) Steven Thompson	(Wales) Cardiff City	£250,000
17 January 2006	(Scotland) Ross McCormack	(England) Doncaster Rovers	Loan
27 January 2006	(Finland) Jukka Santala	(Denmark) FC Nordsjælland	Free
10 April 2006	(Georgia (country)) Zurab Khizanishvili	(England) Blackburn Rovers	£500,000
21 April 2006	(Scotland) Brian McLean	(Scotland) Motherwell	Undisclosed

- Expenditure: ▼£1,400,000
- Income: ▲£750,000
- Total loss/gain: ▼£650,000

=== Squad statistics ===
				Total			Scottish Premier League		UEFA Champions League		Scottish Cup		League Cup	
No.	Pos.	Nat.	Name	Sts	App	Gls	App	Gls	App	Gls	App	Gls	App	Gls
1	GK	(Germany)	Stefan Klos	3	3		2						1	
2	DF	(Netherlands)	Fernando Ricksen	30	31	1	21		8	1	1		1	
3	DF	(England)	Michael Ball	4	4		2		2					
3	DF	(France)	Olivier Bernard	15	15		9		4				2	
4	MF	(Belgium)	Thomas Buffel	32	38	7	29	4	7	1	1		1	2
5	DF	(Trinidad and Tobago)	Marvin Andrews	27	30	4	23	3	4		2		1	1
6	MF	(Scotland)	Barry Ferguson	45	46	5	32	5	10		2		2	
7	MF	(Algeria)	Brahim Hemdani	23	24		19		5					
8	MF	(Scotland)	Alex Rae	6	12		9		2		1			
9	FW	(Croatia)	Dado Pršo	37	41	12	32	9	7	3	1		1	
10	FW	(Spain)	Nacho Novo	14	32	3	24	2	5	1	2		1	
11	MF	(Scotland)	Gavin Rae	4	8		8							
12	DF	(Scotland)	Robert Malcolm	15	17		13		1		2		1	
14	DF	(Greece)	Sotirios Kyrgiakos	40	40	3	28	1	8	1	2	1	2	
15	FW	(Scotland)	Kris Boyd	17	21	20	17	17	2		2	3		
16	DF	(France)	Julien Rodriguez	29	30	1	21	1	8				1	
17	MF	(Scotland)	Chris Burke	30	35	3	27	3	6		2			
18	DF	(France)	José-Karl Pierre-Fanfan	9	10	1	7	1	2				1	
19	FW	(Scotland)	Steven Thompson	6	22	3	14	2	7	1			1	
20	DF	(Scotland)	Alan Hutton	21	23		19		3				1	
20	DF	(Scotland)	Maurice Ross		1		1							
21	FW	(England)	Francis Jeffers	7	14		8		4				2	
23	FW	(Argentina)	Federico Nieto	1	6	3	3	1	2				1	2
24	DF	(Scotland)	Ian Murray	37	42		30		8		2		2	
25	GK	(Netherlands)	Ronald Waterreus	49	49		36		10		2		1	
26	MF	(Denmark)	Peter Løvenkrands	35	47	18	33	14	10	4	2		2	
31	MF	(Tunisia)	Hamed Namouchi	14	16		7		7				2	
34	DF	(Scotland)	Steven Smith	18	20		18		1				1	
38	MF	(Scotland)	Charlie Adam		1		1							
41	GK	(England)	Lee Robinson		1		1							
44	FW	(Scotland)	Ross McCormack	2	11	3	8	1	2	1	1	1		
51	DF	(Scotland)	Alan Lowing	2	4		2				1		1	
66	FW	(Antigua and Barbuda)	Moses Ashikodi		1		1							

Last updated: 20 May 2006
Source: Soccerbase - Rangers 2005/2006 player appearances
Ordered by squad numbers
0 shown as blank

=== Goal scorers ===
N	P	Nat.	Name	League	Scottish Cup	League Cup	Champions League	Total
15	FW	(Scotland)	Kris Boyd	17	3			20
26	MF	(Denmark)	Peter Løvenkrands	14			4	18
9	FW	(Croatia)	Dado Pršo	9			3	12
4	MF	(Belgium)	Thomas Buffel	4		2	1	7
6	MF	(Scotland)	Barry Ferguson	5				5
5	DF	(Trinidad and Tobago)	Marvin Andrews	3		1		4
10	FW	(Spain)	Nacho Novo	2			1	3
14	DF	(Greece)	Sotirios Kyrgiakos	1	1		1	3
17	MF	(Scotland)	Chris Burke	3				3
19	FW	(Scotland)	Steven Thompson	2			1	3
23	FW	(Argentina)	Federico Nieto	1		2		3
44	FW	(Scotland)	Ross McCormack	1	1		1	3
2	DF	(Netherlands)	Fernando Ricksen		1			1
16	DF	(France)	Julien Rodriguez	1				1
18	DF	(France)	José-Karl Pierre-Fanfan	1				1

Last updated: 7 May 2006
Source: Match reports
Only competitive matches

== Club ==
=== Board of directors ===
Position	Staff
Chairman	(Scotland) David Murray
Vice-chairman	(Scotland) John McClelland (until 19 September)
Chief executive	(Scotland) Martin Bain
Finance director	(Scotland) David Jolliffe
Non-executive director	(Scotland) John Greig
Non-executive director	(Scotland) Alastair Johnston
Non-executive director	(Scotland) John McClelland (from 19 September)
Non-executive director	(Scotland) Dave King
Non-executive director	(Scotland) Donald Wilson
Non-executive director	(Scotland) Campbell Ogilvie

Source: n

=== Coaching staff ===
Position	Staff
Manager	(Scotland) Alex McLeish (until 8 May)
Assistant manager	(Scotland) Andy Watson (until 8 May)
First-team coach	(Netherlands) Jan Wouters (until 8 May)
Fitness coach	(Scotland) Frank Nuttall (until 8 May)
Goalkeepers coach	(Scotland) Billy Thomson

Source: Wikipedia article

=== Other staff ===
Position	Staff
Head of Football Administration	(Scotland) Campbell Ogilvie (until 19 September) (Scotland) Andrew Dickson (from 19 September)
Head of Youth Development	(Scotland) George Adams (until 19 September) (Scotland) Craig Mulholland (from 19 September)
Club Doctor	(Scotland) Dr Ian McGuinness
Physiotherapists	(Scotland) Davie Henderson
Massuer	(Scotland) David Lavery
Kit controller	(Scotland) Jimmy Bell
Video analyst	(Scotland) Steve Harvey

Source: Wikipedia article

== Matches ==
=== Pre-season and friendlies ===
Game	Date	Tournament	Round	Ground	Opponent	Score^{1}	Report
1	9 July 2005	Friendly		A	(Canada) CPSL XI	4–1	Report / Report link; Kick off / 18:00 EDT; Attendance / 200; Referee / (Canada); CPSL XI / Rangers; 90' Pop / 52' McCormack; 81' Santala; 82' McCormack; 88' Thompson
2	12 July 2005	Friendly		N	(Croatia) Dinamo Zagreb	0–1	Report / Report link; Kick off / TBC EDT; Attendance / 18,159; Referee / (Canada) Silviu Petrescu; Rangers / Dinamo Zagreb; / 81' Kardum
3	16 July 2005	Friendly		A	(Northern Ireland) Linfield	2–0	Report / Report link; Kick off / 15:00 BST; Linfield / Rangers; / 52' Løvenkrands; McCormack
4	19 July 2005	Friendly		A	(England) Ipswich Town	2–0	Report / Report link; Kick off / 19:45 BST; Attendance / 17,202; Referee / Gary Lewis (England); Ipswich Town / Rangers; / 54' Løvenkrands; 88' Novo
5	23 July 2005	Friendly		H	(Germany) Borussia Mönchengladbach	0–0	Report / Report link; Kick off / 15:00 BST; Attendance / 30,264; Referee / Mike McCurry (Scotland)
6	26 July 2005	Friendly		A	St Mirren	1–0	Kick off / 19:45 BST; Attendance / 6,504; Referee / C Melville; St Mirren / Rangers; / 5' McCormack

Last updated: 26 July 2005
^{1}Rangers goals come first.
National flags for Ground and Opponent columns are only shown when different from that of Rangers.
M = Match; Ground: H = Home, A = Away, N = Neutral, HR = Home replacement, AR = Away replacement.

=== Scottish Premier League ===
Game	Date	Tournament	Round	Ground	Opponent	Score^{1}	Report
1	31 July 2005	Scottish Premier League	1	H	Livingston	3–0	Report / Report link; Kick off / 1400 BST; Attendance / 49,613; Referee / Craig Thomson (Scotland); Rangers / Livingston; 23' Pršo; 53' Fanfan; 90' Peter Løvenkrands / (yellow card) 74' (red card) Brittain
2	6 August 2005	Scottish Premier League	2	A	Inverness Caledonian Thistle	1–0	Report / Report link; Kick off / 1500 BST; Attendance / 7,512; Referee / Calum Murray (Scotland); Inverness Caledonian Thistle / Rangers; / 69' Ferguson
4	14 August 2005	Scottish Premier League	3	A	Aberdeen	2–3	Report / Report link; Kick off / 1400 BST; Attendance / 18,182; Referee / John Underhill (Scotland); Aberdeen / Rangers; 30' Anderson; 37' Lovell; 88' Smith / 39' Pršo; 49' Løvenkrands; (yellow card) 55' (red card) Ricksen
5	20 August 2005	Scottish Premier League	4	H	Celtic	3–1	Report / Report link; Kick off / 1230 BST; Attendance / 49,699; Referee / Stuart Dougal (Scotland); Rangers / Celtic; 34' Pršo; 51' Buffel; 88' (pen.) Novo / (red card) 23' Thompson; 86' (pen.) Maloney; (yellow card) 90' (red card) Lennon
7	27 August 2005	Scottish Premier League	5	H	Hibernian	0–3	Report / Report link; Kick off / 1500 BST; Attendance / 49,754; Referee / Iain Brines (Scotland); Rangers / Hibernian; / 67' Sproule; 86' Sproule; 90' Sproule
8	10 September 2005	Scottish Premier League	6	A	Falkirk	1–1	Report / Report link; Kick off / 1500 BST; Attendance / 6,500; Referee / Craig Mackay (Scotland); Falkirk / Rangers; 78' McBreen / 39' (pen.) Novo
10	17 September 2005	Scottish Premier League	7	H	Kilmarnock	3–0	Report / Report link; Kick off / 1500 BST; Attendance / 49,076; Referee / Calum Murray (Scotland); Rangers / Kilmarnock; 9' (pen.) Pršo; 67' Ferguson; 82' (o.g.) Greer
12	24 September 2005	Scottish Premier League	8	A	Heart of Midlothian	0–1	Report / Report link; Kick off / BST; Attendance / 17,379; Referee / Kenny Clark (Scotland); Heart of Midlothian / Rangers; 14' Bednář
14	1 October 2005	Scottish Premier League	9	H	Dunfermline Athletic	5–1	Report / Report link; Kick off / 1500 BST; Attendance / 48,374; Referee / John Underhill (Scotland); Rangers / Dunfermline Athletic; 15' Buffel; 38' Pršo; 71' Nieto; 75' Løvenkrands; 86' McCormack / 54' Hunt
15	15 October 2005	Scottish Premier League	10	A	Dundee United	0–0	Report / Report link; Kick off / 1400 BST; Attendance / 11,696; Referee / Charlie Richmond (Scotland); Dundee United / Rangers; / (yellow card) 90' (red card) Kyrgiakos
17	22 October 2005	Scottish Premier League	11	H	Motherwell	2–0	Report / Report link; Kick off / 1500 BST; Attendance / 49,215; Referee / Steve Conroy (Scotland); Rangers / Motherwell; 1' Burke; 72' Løvenkrands
18	26 October 2005	Scottish Premier League	12	A	Livingston	2–2	Report / Report link; Kick off / 1945 BST; Attendance / 7,481; Referee / Craig Thomson (Scotland); Livingston / Rangers; 56' Snodgrass; 64' Snodgrass / 15' Ferguson; 54' Burke
19	29 October 2005	Scottish Premier League	13	H	Inverness Caledonian Thistle	1–1	Report / Report link; Kick off / 1500 BST; Attendance / 47,867; Referee / Iain Brines (Scotland); Rangers / Inverness Caledonian Thistle; 54' Thompson / 26' Dargo; (yellow card) 82' (red card) Bayne
21	5 November 2005	Scottish Premier League	14	H	Aberdeen	0–0	Report / Report link; Kick off / 1500 GMT; Attendance / 49,717; Referee / Stuart Dougal (Scotland)
23	19 November 2005	Scottish Premier League	15	A	Celtic	0–3	Report / Report link; Kick off / 1230 GMT; Attendance / 58,997; Referee / Dougie McDonald (Scotland); Celtic / Rangers; 12' Hartson; 56' Baldé; 61' McGeady
25	26 November 2005	Scottish Premier League	16	A	Hibernian	1–2	Report / Report link; Kick off / 1400 GMT; Attendance / 16,958; Referee / Stuart Dougal (Scotland); Hibernian / Rangers; 18' Riordan; 25' O'Connor / 59' Ferguson; (yellow card) 90' (red card) Ferguson
26	3 December 2005	Scottish Premier League	17	H	Falkirk	2–2	Report / Report link; Kick off / 1500 GMT; Attendance / 48,042; Referee / Iain Fyfe (Scotland); Rangers / Falkirk; 31' Ireland; 56' (pen.) Løvenkrands / 69' Gow; 71' Moutinho
28	10 December 2005	Scottish Premier League	18	A	Kilmarnock	3–2	Report / Report link; Kick off / 1400 GMT; Attendance / 12,426; Referee / John Underhill (Scotland); Kilmarnock / Rangers; 61' McDonald; 82' Boyd / 16' Løvenkrands; 42' Løvenkrands; 72' Løvenkrands
29	17 December 2005	Scottish Premier League	19	H	Heart of Midlothian	1–0	Report / Report link; Kick off / 1500 GMT; Attendance / 49,723; Referee / Mike McCurry (Scotland); Rangers / Heart of Midlothian; 35' Løvenkrands / (red card) 86' Mikoliūnas
30	26 December 2005	Scottish Premier League	20	A	Dunfermline Athletic	3–3	Report / Report link; Kick off / 1500 GMT; Attendance / 9,481; Referee / Craig Thomson (Scotland); Dunfermline Athletic / Rangers; 22' Løvenkrands; 65' (pen.) Løvenkrands; 67' Burke; (yellow card) 90' (red card) Kyrgiakos / 16' Tod; 23' Burchill; 90' (pen.) Young
31	31 December 2005	Scottish Premier League	21	H	Dundee United	3–0	Report / Report link; Kick off / 1400 GMT; Attendance / 49,141; Referee / Charlie Richmond (Scotland); Rangers / Dundee United; 68' Buffel; 83' Thompson; 86' Løvenkrands
33	14 January 2006	Scottish Premier League	22	A	Motherwell	1–0	Report / Report link; Kick off / 1400 GMT; Attendance / 10,689; Referee / Kenny Clark (Scotland); Motherwell / Rangers; 55' Løvenkrands
34	21 January 2006	Scottish Premier League	23	H	Livingston	4–1	Report / Report link; Kick off / 1500 GMT; Attendance / 49,211; Referee / Eddie Smith (Scotland); Rangers / Livingston; 8' Boyd; 56' Boyd; 89' Pršo; 90' Pršo / 52' Vincze
35	28 January 2006	Scottish Premier League	24	A	Inverness Caledonian Thistle	3–2	Report / Report link; Kick off / 1400 GMT; Attendance / 7,380; Referee / Alan Freeland (Scotland); Inverness Caledonian Thistle / Rangers; 13' Dargo; 72' Wyness / 6' Boyd; 27' Andrews; 58' (pen.) Boyd
37	8 February 2006	Scottish Premier League	25	A	Aberdeen	0–2	Report / Report link; Kick off / 1945 GMT; Attendance / 17,087; Referee / John Underhill (Scotland); Aberdeen / Rangers; 34' Smith; 43' Lovell
38	12 February 2006	Scottish Premier League	26	H	Celtic	0–1	Report / Report link; Kick off / 1230 GMT; Attendance / 49,788; Referee / Mike McCurry (Scotland); Rangers / Celtic; / 12' Żurawski
39	18 February 2006	Scottish Premier League	27	H	Hibernian	2–0	Report / Report link; Kick off / 1500 GMT; Attendance / 49,720; Referee / Iain Brines (Scotland); Rangers / Hibernian; 40' Boyd; 74' Ferguson
41	4 March 2006	Scottish Premier League	28	A	Falkirk	2–1	Report / Report link; Kick off / 1500 GMT; Attendance / 6,343; Referee / John Underhill (Scotland); Falkirk / Rangers; 66' Latapy / 57' Boyd; 70' (o.g.) Twaddle
43	11 March 2006	Scottish Premier League	29	H	Kilmarnock	4–0	Report / Report link; Kick off / 1500 GMT; Attendance / 49,442; Referee / Dougie McDonald (Scotland); Rangers / Kilmarnock; 13' Boyd; 71' Rodriguez; 85' (pen.) Pršo; 87' Løvenkrands / (red card) 84' Combe
44	18 March 2006	Scottish Premier League	30	A	Heart of Midlothian	1–1	Report / Report link; Kick off / GMT; Attendance / 17,040; Referee / Craig Thomson (Scotland); Heart of Midlothian / Rangers; 8' Jankauskas / 65' Buffel
45	25 March 2006	Scottish Premier League	31	H	Dunfermline Athletic	1–0	Report / Report link; Kick off / 1500 GMT; Attendance / 49,017; Referee / Brian Winter (Scotland); Rangers / Dunfermline Athletic; 70' Kyrgiakos
46	1 April 2006	Scottish Premier League	32	A	Dundee United	4–1	Report / Report link; Kick off / 1500 GMT; Attendance / 11,213; Referee / John Underhill (Scotland); Dundee United / Rangers; 30' Pršo; 31' Boyd; 54' Boyd; 83' Boyd / 68' Samuel
47	8 April 2006	Scottish Premier League	33	H	Motherwell	1–0	Report / Report link; Kick off / 1500 GMT; Attendance / 49,481; Referee / Kenny Clark (Scotland); Rangers / Motherwell; 27' Boyd
48	15 April 2006	Scottish Premier League	34	H	Aberdeen	1–1	Report / Report link; Kick off / 1500 GMT; Attendance / 48,987; Referee / Mike McCurry (Scotland); Rangers / Aberdeen; 51' Boyd / 68' Severin
49	23 April 2006	Scottish Premier League	35	A	Celtic	0–0	Report / Report link; Kick off / 1230 GMT; Attendance / 59,684; Referee / Craig Thomson (Scotland)
50	29 April 2006	Scottish Premier League	36	A	Kilmarnock	3–1	Report / Report link; Kick off / 1500 GMT; Attendance / 11,583; Referee / Craig Thomson (Scotland); Kilmarnock / Rangers; 51' Andrews; 64' Boyd; 79' Andrews / 27' Nish
51	2 May 2006	Scottish Premier League	37	A	Hibernian	2–1	Report / Report link; Kick off / 1945 GMT; Attendance / 10,000; Referee / Mike McCurry (Scotland); Hibernian / Rangers; 36' Boyd; 74' Boyd / 72' (o.g.) Hemdani
52	7 May 2006	Scottish Premier League	38	H	Heart of Midlothian	2–0	Report / Report link; Kick off / 1400 GMT; Attendance / 49,792; Referee / Iain Brines (Scotland); Rangers / Heart of Midlothian; 36' Boyd; 74' Boyd

Last updated: 7 May 2006
Source: Wikipedia article
^{1}Rangers goals come first.
National flags for Ground and Opponent columns are only shown when different from that of Rangers.
M = Match; Ground: H = Home, A = Away, N = Neutral, HR = Home replacement, AR = Away replacement.

=== Scottish League Cup ===
Game

Date

Tournament

Round

Ground

Opponent

Score^{1}

Report

11
20 September 2005
League Cup
3
H
Clyde
5–2

Report	Report link
Kick off	19:45 BST
Attendance	30,104
Referee	Mike McCurry (Scotland)
Rangers	Clyde
5' Buffel; 74' Buffel; 98' Nieto; 111' Andrews; 113' Nieto	51' Bryson; 73' (pen.) O'Donnell

22
9 November 2005
League Cup
QF
A
Celtic
0–2

Report	Report link
Kick off	19:45 GMT
Attendance	57,183
Referee	Kenny Clark (Scotland)
Celtic	Rangers
50' Maloney; 82' (o.g.) Klos	(yellow card) 82' (red card) Kyrgiakos

Last updated: 9 November 2005
Source: Wikipedia article
^{1}Rangers goals come first.
National flags for Ground and Opponent columns are only shown when different from that of Rangers.
M = Match; Ground: H = Home, A = Away, N = Neutral, HR = Home replacement, AR = Away replacement.

=== Scottish Cup ===
Game

Date

Tournament

Round

Ground

Opponent

Score^{1}

Report

32
7 January 2006
Scottish Cup
3
H
Peterhead
5–0

Report	Report link
Kick off	15:00 GMT
Attendance	39,870
Referee	Brian Winter (Scotland)
Rangers	Peterhead
35' Kyrgiakos; 50' (pen.) Boyd; 54' Boyd; 71' Boyd; 75' McCormack

36
4 February 2006
Scottish Cup
4
H
Hibernian
0–3

Report	Report link
Kick off	12:15 GMT
Attendance	40,722
Referee	Stuart Dougal (Scotland)
Rangers	Hibernian
	50' O'Connor; 59' Sproule; 78' Killen

Last updated: 4 February 2006
Source: Wikipedia article
^{1}Rangers goals come first.
National flags for Ground and Opponent columns are only shown when different from that of Rangers.
M = Match; Ground: H = Home, A = Away, N = Neutral, HR = Home replacement, AR = Away replacement.

=== UEFA Champions League ===
Game	Date	Tournament	Round	Ground	Opponent	Score^{1}	Report
3	9 August 2005	UEFA Champions League	QR3	AR	(Cyprus) Anorthosis Famagusta	2–1	Report / Report link; Kick off / 19:00 BST; Attendance / 16,900; Referee / (Belgium) Frank De Bleeckere; Rangers / Anorthosis Famagusta; 72' Frousos / 64' Novo; 71' Ricksen
6	24 August 2005	UEFA Champions League	QR3	H	(Cyprus) Anorthosis Famagusta	2–0	Report / Report link; Kick off / 19:45 BST; Attendance / 48,500; Referee / (Russia) Valentin Ivanov; Rangers / Anorthosis Famagusta; 39' Buffel; 58' Pršo
9	13 September 2005	UEFA Champions League	GS	H	(Portugal) Porto	3–2	Report / Report link; Kick off / 19:45 BST; Attendance / 48,599; Referee / (Netherlands) Jan Wegereef; Rangers / Porto; 35' Løvenkrands; 59' Pršo; 85' Kyrgiakos / 47' Pepe; 71' Pepe
13	28 September 2005	UEFA Champions League	GS	A	(Italy) Inter Milan	0–1	Report / Report link; Kick off / 19:45 BST; Attendance / 0; Referee / (Greece) Kyros Vassaras; Inter Milan / Rangers; 49' Pizarro
16	19 October 2005	UEFA Champions League	GS	H	(Slovakia) Artmedia Petržalka	0–0	Report / Report link; Kick off / 19:45 BST; Attendance / 49,018; Referee / (Spain) Arturo Dauden Ibanez
20	1 November 2005	UEFA Champions League	GS	AR	(Slovakia) Artmedia Petržalka	2–2	Report / Report link; Kick off / 19:45 GMT; Attendance / 6,527; Referee / (Germany) Florian Meyer; Artmedia Petržalka / Rangers; 8' Borbély; 59' Kozák / 3' Pršo; 44' Thompson
24	23 November 2005	UEFA Champions League	GS	A	(Portugal) Porto	1–1	Report / Report link; Kick off / 19:45 GMT; Attendance / 48,000; Referee / (Germany) Herbert Fandel; Porto / Rangers; 60' Lopez / 83' McCormack
27	6 December 2005	UEFA Champions League	GS	H	(Italy) Inter Milan	1–1	Report / Report link; Kick off / 19:45 GMT; Attendance / 49,170; Referee / (Austria) Konrad Plautz; Rangers / Inter Milan; 38' Løvenkrands / 30' Adriano; (yellow card) 87' (red card) Zanetti
40	22 February 2006	UEFA Champions League	L16	H	(Spain) Villarreal	2–2	Report / Report link; Kick off / 19:45 GMT; Attendance / 49,372; Referee / (France) Eric Poulat; Rangers / Villarreal; 22' Løvenkrands; 82' (o.g.) Peña / 8' (pen.) Riquelme; 35' Forlán
42	7 March 2006	UEFA Champions League	L16	A	(Spain) Villarreal	1–1	Report / Report link; Kick off / 19:45 GMT; Attendance / 23,000; Referee / (Luxembourg) Alain Hamer; Villarreal / Rangers; 49' Arruabarrena / 12' Løvenkrands

Last updated: 7 March 2006
Source: Wikipedia article
^{1}Rangers goals come first.
National flags for Ground and Opponent columns are only shown when different from that of Rangers.
M = Match; Ground: H = Home, A = Away, N = Neutral, HR = Home replacement, AR = Away replacement.

== Competitions ==
=== Overall ===
Competition	Started round	Current position / round	Final position / round	First match	Last match
Scottish Premier League	—	—	3rd	31 July	7 May
UEFA Champions League	Third qualifying round	—	Round of 16	9 August	7 March
League Cup	3rd Round	—	Semi-finals	20 September	9 November
Scottish Cup	3rd Round	—	4th Round	7 January	4 February

Source: Competitions

=== Scottish Premier League ===
==== Standings ====
Pos	Team	Pld	W	D	L	GF	GA	GD	Pts	Qualification or relegation (Note: Teams played each other three times (33 matches), before the league split into two groups (the top six and the bottom six) for the last five matches.)
1	Celtic (C)	38	28	7	3	93	37	+56	91	Qualification for the Champions League group stage
2	Heart of Midlothian	38	22	8	8	71	31	+40	74	Qualification for the Champions League second qualifying round
3	Rangers	38	21	10	7	67	37	+30	73	Qualification for the UEFA Cup first round
4	Hibernian	38	17	5	16	61	56	+5	56	Qualification for the UEFA Intertoto Cup second round (Note: Hibernian qualified for the 2006 UEFA Intertoto Cup by being the highest place applicant for the competition.)
5	Kilmarnock	38	15	10	13	63	64	−1	55	

Source: Scottish Professional Football League
Rules for classification: 1) Points; 2) Goal difference; 3) Goals scored
(C) Champions

==== Results summary ====
Overall								Home						Away					
Pld	W	D	L	GF	GA	GD	Pts	W	D	L	GF	GA	GD	W	D	L	GF	GA	GD
38	21	10	7	67	37	+30	73	13	4	2	38	11	+27	8	6	5	29	26	+3

Last updated: 7 May 2005.
Source: Wikipedia article

==== Results by round ====
Round	1	2	3	4	5	6	7	8	9	10	11	12	13	14	15	16	17	18	19	20	21	22	23	24	25	26	27	28	29	30	31	32	33	34	35	36	37	38
Ground	H	A	A	H	H	A	H	A	H	A	H	A	H	H	A	A	H	A	H	A	H	A	H	A	A	H	H	A	H	A	H	A	H	H	A	A	A	H
Result	W	W	L	W	L	D	W	L	W	D	W	D	D	D	L	L	D	W	W	D	W	W	W	W	L	L	W	W	W	D	W	W	W	D	D	W	W	W

Updated to match(es) played on 7 May 2005. Source: 2005–06 Scottish Premier League
A = Away; H = Home; W = Win; D = Draw; L = Loss

=== UEFA Champions League ===
==== Group H ====
Pos	Team	Pld	W	D	L	GF	GA	GD	Pts	Qualification
1	(Italy) Internazionale	6	4	1	1	9	4	+5	13	Advance to knockout stage
2	(Scotland) Rangers	6	1	4	1	7	7	0	7	Advance to knockout stage
3	(Slovakia) Artmedia Bratislava	6	1	3	2	5	9	−4	6	Transfer to UEFA Cup
4	(Portugal) Porto	6	1	2	3	8	9	−1	5	

Source: RSSSF
