= FC Ile-Saulet =

- Full name: Football Club Ile-Saulet; Іле-Сәулет Футбол Клубы
- Founded: 2006
- Dissolved: 2013; 12 years ago
- Ground: Central Stadium; Otegen Batyr, Kazakhstan
- League: Kazakhstan First Division
- 2013: 6th

FC Ile-Saulet (Kazakh: Іле-Сәулет Футбол Клубы) is a defunct Kazakhstani football club that was based in Otegen Batyr (Ile District of Almaty Province).

== History ==
The club was formed in 2006, debuting in the Kazakhstan First Division in 2008, before ceasing to exist at the end of the 2013 season.

=== Domestic history ===
Season	League									Kazakhstan Cup	Top goalscorer		Manager
Season	Div.	Pos.	Pl.	W	D	L	GS	GA	P	Kazakhstan Cup	Name	League	Manager
2008	2nd	4th	26	13	5	8	44	31	44	First round	(Kazakhstan) Vladimir Karpin	13	
2009	2nd	5th	26	12	9	5	53	24	45	First round	(Kazakhstan) Alex Shapurin	11	
2010	2nd	5th	32	18	9	7	73	38	63	First round	(Kazakhstan) Zhandos Orazaliyev	9	
2011	2nd	3rd	32	18	5	9	42	23	59	First round	(Kazakhstan) Zhandos Orazaliyev	11	
2012	2nd	1	30	17	10	3	52	20	61	First round	(Kazakhstan) Alex Shapurin	10	
2013	2nd	6th	34	19	8	7	66	32	65	First round	(Kazakhstan) Aidar Argimbayev	9	

== Honours ==
- Kazakhstan First Division
  - Champions (1): 2012
