= 2008 Kazakhstan First Division =

Kazakhstan First Division
- Season: 2008
- Promoted: Kairat; Akzhayik Oral
- Relegated: Gornyak

The 2008 Kazakhstan First Division was the 14th edition of Kazakhstan First Division, the second level football competition in Kazakhstan. Unlike the previous years, number of teams were shortened, due to creation of reserve teams league for Premier League teams. Thus, this season 14 teams started to play against each other on home-away system. Two best teams gain promotion to the Premier League next season. League started on May 1 and finished on October 11

== League table ==
Pos	Team	Pld	W	D	L	GF	GA	GD	Pts	Promotion
1	Kazakhmys (C, P)	26	20	1	5	54	21	+33	61	Promotion to the Kazakhstan Premier League
2	Taraz (P)	26	19	4	3	61	14	+47	61	Promotion to the Kazakhstan Premier League
3	Spartak Semey	26	13	8	5	50	35	+15	47	
4	Ile-Saulet	26	13	5	8	44	31	+13	44	
5	Avangard	26	13	1	12	43	48	−5	40	
6	Aktobe-Zhas	27	13	1	13	54	53	+1	40	
7	Asbest	26	11	4	11	37	41	−4	37	
8	Aksu	26	10	7	9	39	38	+1	37	
9	Caspiy	26	11	1	14	42	55	−13	34	
10	Akzhayik Oral	26	10	1	15	35	47	−12	31	
11	Bolat	26	9	4	13	50	49	+1	31	
12	Karasay Sarbazdary	26	6	6	14	27	38	−11	24	
13	Aizharyk Shymkent (Note: Aizharyk was penalized with 6 six points.)	26	7	8	11	49	49	0	23	
14	Gornyak	26	1	1	24	11	77	−66	4	Withdrew from the league (Note: Gornyak was not able to finish due to financial reasons and withdrew from the league in the middle of the season.)

(C) Champions; (P) Promoted
