= 2011 Kazakhstan First Division =

Kazakhstan First Division
- Season: 2011
- Champions: Sunkar
- Promoted: Sunkar; Okzhetpes; Akzhayik
- Matches: 252
- Goals: 306 (1.21 per match)
- Top goalscorer: Kanat Akhmetov (24 goals total)

The 2011 Kazakhstan First Division was the 17th edition of Kazakhstan First Division, the second level football competition in Kazakhstan. 18 teams to play against each other on home-away system. Two top teams gain promotion to the Premier League next season.

== Teams ==
=== Stadia and locations ===
Location of teams in 2011 Kazakhstan First Division

| Pos | Team | Location | Venue | Capacity | Head Coach | Team Captain |
|---|---|---|---|---|---|---|
| 8 | Ak Bulak | Talgar | UTC CSKA | 3,000 | (Kazakhstan) Marat Yesmuratov | (Kazakhstan) Ibragim Baimurziyev |
| 9 | Aktobe-Zhas | Aktobe | ODYUSH #2 | 3,200 | (Kazakhstan) Samat Dzhumalishev | (Kazakhstan) Yuri Kuvakin |
| 11 | Tarlan | Shymkent | | | (Kazakhstan) Kanat Musatayev | (Kazakhstan) |
| 7 | Astana-64 | Astana | K.Munaitpasov Stadium | 12,343 | (Kazakhstan) Yuri Konkov | (Kazakhstan) |
| 6 | Bolat | Temirtau | Metallurg | 15,000 | (Kazakhstan) Aleksandr Moskalenko | (Kazakhstan) |
| 12 | Caspiy | Aktau | Zhas Kanat | 5,000 | (Kazakhstan) Mels Kushanov | (Kazakhstan) Nurbek Toksanov |
| 10 | Tsesna | Almaty | Tsesna | 300 | (Kazakhstan) Samvel Kostandyan | (Kazakhstan) |
| 17 | CSKA Almaty | Almaty | CSKA | 2,000 | (Kazakhstan) Oleg Trofimov | (Kazakhstan) Ivan Karkachov |
| 5 | Ekibastuz | Ekibastuz | Shakhter | 6,300 | (Kazakhstan) Vitali Sparyshev | (Kazakhstan) Aidyn Bralin |
| 16 | Gefest | Karaganda | Sunkar Stadium (Saran) | | (Kazakhstan) Ilya Melanic | (Kazakhstan) Dastan Darabayev |
| 3 | Ile-Saulet | Otegen Batyr | Football Land (Almaty) | 2,000 | (Kazakhstan) Berik Argimbayev | (Kazakhstan) Yerkin Nurzhanov |
| 2 | Okzhetpes | Kokshetau | Okzhetpes Stadium | 4,158 | (Kazakhstan) Vladimir Cheburin | (Kazakhstan) |
| w/o | Kazakhmys | Satpayev | Kazakhmys | 2,300 | (Kazakhstan) Andrei Kucheryavykh | (Kazakhstan) |
| 15 | Kyzylzhar | Petropavl | Karasai | | (Kazakhstan) Yuri Chukhleba | (Kazakhstan) Andrei Selivyorstov |
| 13 | Lashyn | Taraz | Zhastar | 3,000 | (Kazakhstan) Talgar Dzhunusbayev | (Kazakhstan) Yerzhan Dzhatkanbayev |
| 14 | Spartak Semey | Semey | Spartak | 11,000 | (Kazakhstan) Marat Syzdykov | (Kazakhstan) Igor Goryachev |
| 1 | Sunkar | Kaskelen | Tauelsizdik 10 zhyldygy | 2,500 | (Kazakhstan) Askar Kozhabergenov | (Kazakhstan) Zhiger Kukeyev |
| 4 | Akzhayik | Oral | Petr Atoyan Stadium | 8,320 | (Russia) Andrey Chernyshov | (Kazakhstan) |

== League table ==
| Pos | Team | Pld | W | D | L | GF | GA | GD | Pts | Promotion |
|---|---|---|---|---|---|---|---|---|---|---|
| 1 | Sunkar (C, P) | 32 | 24 | 5 | 3 | 62 | 19 | +43 | 77 | Promotion to the Kazakhstan Premier League |
| 2 | Okzhetpes (P) | 32 | 21 | 6 | 5 | 59 | 25 | +34 | 69 | Promotion to the Kazakhstan Premier League |
| 3 | Ile-Saulet | 32 | 18 | 5 | 9 | 42 | 23 | +19 | 59 | |
| 4 | Akzhayik (P) | 32 | 16 | 8 | 8 | 54 | 30 | +24 | 53 (Note: Akzhaiyk and Kyzylzhar lose 3 points each by a decision of FFK regulating bodies) | Promotion to the Kazakhstan Premier League |
| 5 | Ekibastuz | 32 | 15 | 7 | 10 | 47 | 34 | +13 | 52 | |
| 6 | Bolat | 32 | 15 | 5 | 12 | 39 | 32 | +7 | 50 | |
| 7 | Astana-64 | 32 | 14 | 8 | 10 | 48 | 38 | +10 | 50 | |
| 8 | Ak Bulak | 32 | 12 | 11 | 9 | 38 | 31 | +7 | 47 | |
| 9 | Aktobe-Zhas | 32 | 13 | 7 | 12 | 56 | 53 | +3 | 46 | |
| 10 | Tsesna | 32 | 13 | 4 | 15 | 47 | 50 | −3 | 43 | |
| 11 | Tarlan | 32 | 11 | 10 | 11 | 38 | 34 | +4 | 43 | |
| 12 | Caspiy | 32 | 10 | 7 | 15 | 33 | 42 | −9 | 37 | |
| 13 | Lashyn | 32 | 8 | 10 | 14 | 31 | 39 | −8 | 34 | |
| 14 | Spartak Semey | 32 | 8 | 8 | 16 | 36 | 53 | −17 | 32 | |
| 15 | Kyzylzhar | 32 | 7 | 10 | 15 | 34 | 56 | −22 | 28 | |
| 16 | Gefest (Note: Gefest withdrew from the First Division on 20 September, in the remaining games count toward her defeat with a score of 0-3.) | 32 | 6 | 3 | 23 | 21 | 64 | −43 | 21 | |
| 17 | CSKA Almaty | 32 | 3 | 2 | 27 | 19 | 81 | −62 | 11 | |
| - | Kazakhmys | 0 | 0 | 0 | 0 | 0 | 0 | 0 | 0 | Withdrew from the league (Note: Kazakhmys withdrew from the First Division on 25 May.) |

(C) Champions; (P) Promoted
