= Karaoy =

- Village
- Location in Kazakhstan
- Coordinates: 43°31′19″N 76°49′47″E
- Country: Kazakhstan
- Region: Almaty Region
- Time zone: UTC+6 (Omsk Time)

Karaoy (Kazakh: Қараой, Qaraoi) is a village in Ile District of Almaty Region, in south-eastern Kazakhstan.
