= FC Avangard =

- Full name: Football Club Avangard; Авангард ФК
- Founded: 2004
- Dissolved: 2008; 17 years ago
- Ground: Petropavl, Kazakhstan
- League: Kazakhstan First Division
- 2008: 5th

FC Avangard (Kazakh: Авангард футбол клубы, Avangard Fýtbol Klýby) is a defunct Kazakhstani football club that was based in Petropavl. The club won the Kazakhstan First Division in 2006, but were refused promotion to the Kazakhstan Super League due to financial constraints.

== History ==
The club was formed in 2004, before ceasing to exist at the end of the 2008 season.

=== Domestic history ===
Season	League									Kazakhstan Cup	Top goalscorer		Manager
Season	Div.	Pos.	Pl.	W	D	L	GS	GA	P	Kazakhstan Cup	Name	League	Manager
2006	2nd	1	24	16	3	5	39	19	51				
2007	2nd	4th	32	13	5	8	35	34	44				
2008	2nd	5th	26	13	1	12	43	48	40	First round			

== Honours ==
- Kazakhstan First Division (1): 2006
