= 2012 Kazakhstan First Division =

Kazakhstan First Division
- Season: 2012
- Champions: Ile-Saulet
- Promoted: Vostok
- Matches: 240
- Goals: 581 (2.42 per match)

The 2012 Kazakhstan First Division was the 18th edition of Kazakhstan First Division, the second level football competition in Kazakhstan. 15 teams to play against each other on home-away system.. The top team gains promotion to the Premier League next season, while the second-placed team enters playoff series with the eleventh team of the Premier League.

== Teams ==
Locations of teams in the 2012 Kazakhstan First Division

| Team | Location | Venue | Capacity |
|---|---|---|---|
| Ak Bulak | Talgar | Panfilov Stadium | |
| Aktobe-Zhas | Aktobe | | |
| Astana-1964 | Kazhymukan Munaitpasov Stadium | Astana | 12,350 |
| Baikonur | BIIR Stadium | Shymkent | 3,000 |
| Bayterek | Astana Arena | Astana | 30,000 |
| Bolat | Metallurg Stadium | Temirtau | 12,000 |
| Caspiy | Zhastar Stadium | Aktau | 3,500 |
| CSKA Almaty | CSKA Stadium | Almaty | 4,500 |
| Ekibastuz | Shakhter Stadium | Ekibastuz | 6,300 |
| Ile-Saulet | Central Stadium | Otegen Batyr | 2,300 |
| Kairat Academy | Central Stadium | Almaty | 23,000 |
| Kyran | Lokomotive Stadium | Shymkent | 500 |
| Kyzylzhar | Karasai Stadium | Petropavl | 12,000 |
| Lashyn | Lashyn Stadium | Taraz | 2,500 |
| Spartak Semey | Spartak Stadium | Semey | 8,000 |
| Vostok | Vostok Stadium | Oskemen | 12,000 |

== League table ==
| Pos | Team | Pld | W | D | L | GF | GA | GD | Pts | Promotion |
|---|---|---|---|---|---|---|---|---|---|---|
| 1 | Ile-Saulet (C) | 30 | 17 | 10 | 3 | 52 | 20 | +32 | 61 | |
| 2 | Vostok (P) | 30 | 16 | 9 | 5 | 40 | 21 | +19 | 57 | Promotion to the Kazakhstan Premier League |
| 3 | Astana-1964 | 30 | 16 | 9 | 5 | 38 | 17 | +21 | 57 | |
| 4 | Bayterek | 30 | 14 | 11 | 5 | 39 | 19 | +20 | 53 | |
| 5 | Kyran | 30 | 14 | 6 | 10 | 51 | 38 | +13 | 48 | |
| 6 | Spartak Semey | 30 | 14 | 4 | 12 | 38 | 45 | −7 | 46 | |
| 7 | Bolat | 30 | 12 | 10 | 8 | 30 | 23 | +7 | 46 | |
| 8 | Caspiy | 30 | 12 | 7 | 11 | 39 | 31 | +8 | 43 | |
| 9 | Ak Bulak | 30 | 11 | 8 | 11 | 34 | 29 | +5 | 41 | |
| 10 | Lashyn | 30 | 11 | 8 | 11 | 33 | 28 | +5 | 41 | |
| 11 | Kyzylzhar | 30 | 11 | 7 | 12 | 36 | 43 | −7 | 40 | |
| 12 | Ekibastuz | 30 | 11 | 4 | 15 | 45 | 43 | +2 | 37 | |
| 13 | Kairat Academy | 30 | 9 | 9 | 12 | 37 | 41 | −4 | 36 | |
| 14 | Aktobe-Zhas | 30 | 8 | 2 | 20 | 31 | 62 | −31 | 26 | |
| 15 | CSKA Almaty | 30 | 4 | 6 | 20 | 18 | 55 | −37 | 18 | |
| 16 | Baikonur | 30 | 3 | 4 | 23 | 20 | 66 | −46 | 13 | |

Source: Soccerway (in Russian)
Rules for classification: 1st points;
Two team tiebreak: 1st overall wins; 2nd head-to-head record; 3rd goals difference; 4th goals scored; 5th away goals scored;
Multiple teams tiebreak: 1st overall wins; 2nd goals difference; 3rd goals scored; 4th away goals scored
(C) Champions; (P) Promoted
