= FC Ak Bulak =

- Full name: Football Club Ak Bulak; Ақ Бұлақ Футбол Клубы
- Founded: 2009
- Dissolved: 2013; 12 years ago
- Ground: Panfilov Stadium; Talgar, Kazakhstan
- Capacity: 3,000
- League: Kazakhstan First Division
- 2013: 10th

FC Ak Bulak (Kazakh: Ақ Бұлақ Футбол Клубы) is a defunct Kazakhstani football club that was based in Talgar, Almaty Region.

== History ==
The club was formed in 2009, debuting in the Kazakhstan First Division in 2010, and ceased to exist at the end of the 2013 season when all first division clubs in the Region were closed due to financial reasons.

=== Domestic history ===
Season	League									Kazakhstan Cup	Top goalscorer		Manager
Season	Div.	Pos.	Pl.	W	D	L	GS	GA	P	Kazakhstan Cup	Name	League	Manager
2010	2nd	8th	32	12	11	9	38	31	47	First round	(Kazakhstan) Constantine Zadorozhnyy	17	
2011	2nd	8th	32	12	11	8	56	19	77	First round	(Kazakhstan) Constantine Zadorozhnyy	16	
2012	2nd	9th	30	11	8	11	34	29	41	Second round	(Uzbekistan) Pavel Puryshkin	12	
2013	2nd	10th	34	14	6	14	49	39	48	First round	(Kazakhstan) Constantine Zadorozhnyy	14	
