= 2007 Kazakhstan First Division =

Kazakhstan First Division
- Season: 2007
- Promoted: Megasport; Energetik

The 2007 Kazakhstan First Division was the 13th edition of Kazakhstan First Division, the second level football competition in Kazakhstan. The division is split into two geographic conferences: North-East and South-West Conferences. Two winners of each conference advance to Final Four tournament, two winners of which then would gain promotion to the Premier League 2008.

== Conference final standings ==
South-West Conference
Pos	Team	Pld	W	D	L	GF	GA	GD	Pts	Qualification
1	Megasport	22	21	1	0	89	10	+79	64	Qualification for the championship round
2	Akzhayik	22	18	2	2	57	14	+43	56	Qualification for the championship round
3	Caspiy	22	13	4	5	46	23	+23	43	
4	Aktobe-Zhas	22	11	4	7	38	32	+6	37	
5	Zhetysu-2	22	8	5	9	32	46	−14	29	
6	Gornyak	22	7	6	9	31	39	−8	27	
7	Ordabasy-2	22	7	2	13	38	58	−20	23	
8	Kaisar-Zhas	22	6	5	11	25	38	−13	23	
9	Cesna	22	6	5	11	33	30	+3	23	
10	Zhambyl	22	4	6	12	22	38	−16	18	
11	Zhastar	22	5	1	16	21	70	−49	16	
12	Munaily	22	4	3	15	27	61	−34	15	
13	Sport Academy Kairat	7	0	0	7	4	20	−16	0	Withdrew from the league (Note: Sport Academy Kairat withdrawn during the season. Thus, all its matches are not taken into account.)

Notes:

North-East Conference
Pos	Team	Pld	W	D	L	GF	GA	GD	Pts	Qualification
1	Energetik	26	24	0	2	62	10	+52	72	Qualification for the championship round
2	Kazakhmys	26	22	3	1	67	14	+53	69	Qualification for the championship round
3	Aksu (Stepnogorsk)	26	18	4	4	65	25	+40	58	
4	Avangard	26	13	5	8	35	34	+1	44	
5	Karasay Sarbazdary	26	12	3	11	47	39	+8	39	
6	Irtysh-2	26	12	2	12	50	42	+8	38	
7	Asbest	26	10	5	11	34	42	−8	35	
8	Bulat	26	9	5	12	30	33	−3	32	
9	Semey	26	7	8	11	29	49	−20	29	
10	Shakhter-Yunost Karagandy	26	6	6	14	25	38	−13	24	
11	Tobol-2	26	5	8	13	32	49	−17	23	
12	Vostok-2	26	5	5	16	25	61	−36	20	
13	Rakhat	26	4	6	16	25	56	−31	18	
14	Batyr	26	0	10	16	8	42	−34	10	

== Championship round ==
All six matches were played on neutral ground in Taldykorgan and Balpyk-Bi. For two teams had identical stats, the champion was revealed after a draw procedure.

Pos	Team	Pld	W	D	L	GF	GA	GD	Pts	Promotion
1	Kazakhmys (Note: Kazakhmys will not be able to start in the 2008 Premier League due to financial reasons. Energetik is promoted instead.) (C)	3	1	2	0	4	1	+3	5	
2	Megasport (P)	3	1	2	0	4	1	+3	5	Promotion to the Kazakhstan Premier League
3	Energetik (P)	3	0	3	0	3	3	0	3	Promotion to the Kazakhstan Premier League
4	Akzhayik	3	0	1	2	1	7	−6	1	

(C) Champions; (P) Promoted
