= Andrey Lyasyuk =

Belarusian footballer

Personal information
- Date of birth: 14 April 1983 (age 43)
- Place of birth: Pinsk, Byelorussian SSR, Soviet Union
- Height: 1.77 m (5 ft 9 1/2 in)
- Position: Forward

Team information
- Current team: Arsenal Dzerzhinsk (assistant manager)

Youth career
- SDYuShOR-3 Pinsk

Senior career*
Years	Team	Apps	(Gls)
2001–2004	Dinamo Brest	32	(4)
2004	Pinsk-900	13	(18)
2005	Neman Grodno	22	(4)
2006	Volna Pinsk	8	(6)
2006–2007	Minsk	20	(6)
2007–2010	Dnepr Mogilev	51	(17)
2011	Gomel	10	(0)
2011	Dnepr Mogilev	12	(3)
2012–2013	Neman Grodno	43	(8)
2014	Volna Pinsk	12	(8)
2014–2015	Gorodeya	35	(13)
2016	Kauno Žalgiris	9	(0)
2017	Nevėžis Kėdainiai	27	(9)
2018	Lida	26	(8)
2019	Belshina Bobruisk	25	(12)
2020	Lida	19	(5)
2021	Stenles Pinsk	14	(11)

Managerial career
- 2022–2024: Stenles Pinsk
- 2024–2025: Osipovichi
- 2026–: Arsenal Dzerzhinsk (assistant)
- * Club domestic league appearances and goals

Andrey Lyasyuk (Belarusian: Андрэй Лясюк; Russian: Андрей Лясюк; born 14 April 1983) is a Belarusian professional football coach and former player.

== Career ==
Born in Pinsk, Lyasyuk began playing football in FC Dinamo Brest's youth system. He joined the senior team and made his Belarusian Premier League debut in 2001.

In August 2016, Lyasyuk joined A Lyga club Kauno Žalgiris. After the season he left the club and joined I Lyga side Nevėžis.
