= Warren Jacmot =

French footballer (born 1987)

Personal information
- Full name: Warren Jacmot
- Date of birth: March 19, 1987 (age 39)
- Place of birth: Lyon, France
- Height: 1.77 m (5 ft 10 in)
- Position: Right-back

Team information
- Current team: Lyon La-Duchère

Youth career
- Lyon

Senior career*
Years	Team	Apps	(Gls)
2002–2003	Lyon B	30	(0)
2003–2005	Rangers	0	(0)
2005–2006	Lyon La-Duchère	22	(0)
2006–2007	Amiens SC	21	(1)
2008–	Lyon La-Duchère	76	(0)
- * Club domestic league appearances and goals as of 31 October 2026

Warren Jacmot (born March 19, 1987, in Lyon) is a French football defender. He represented France at Under-17 level. He currently plays for Lyon La-Duchère.

== Career ==
Jacmot was a junior with Olympique Lyonnais from where he joined Scottish side Rangers in February 2004, as part of the Rangers Youth Development Company. He played in the 2004 SFA Youth Cup Final, Rangers losing to Kilmarnock, but was released at the end of the 2004–05 season.

He rejoined Lyon La-Duchère in 2008.
