= 2009 Kazakhstan Premier League =

Kazakhstan Premier League
- Season: 2009
- Champions: Aktobe
- Relegated: Kazakhmys; Kaisar; Kyzylzhar
- Champions League: Aktobe
- Europa League: Lokomotiv; Shakhter; Atyrau (via dom. cup)
- Matches: 182
- Goals: 502 (2.76 per match)
- Top goalscorer: Wladimir Baýramow (18); Murat Tleshev (18)
- Biggest home win: Tobol 6–0 Zhetysu
- Biggest away win: Kyzylzhar 0–7 FC Tobol
- Highest scoring: Tobol 6–2 Vostok; Okzhetpes 1–7 Aktobe

The 2009 Kazakhstan Premier League was the 18th season of the Kazakhstan Premier League, the highest football league competition in Kazakhstan. It started on 7 March 2009 and ended in November 2009. Aktobe were the defending champions.

== Changes from 2008 ==
=== Team changes ===
Energetik-2 were relegated to the First Division after finishing in 14th place. FC Atyrau, who originally were going to be demoted as well, were spared because of the withdrawal of Alma-Ata in December 2008.

Kazakhmys and Taraz finished the 2008 season of the First Division in first two places and were therefore promoted to the Premier League.

After the withdrawal of Alma-Ata, the club merged with fellow Almaty team Megasport to create a new side called Lokomotiv. The club is based in Astana.

On 20 January 2009 Kairat voluntarily withdrew from the league because of financial reasons. On the same day FC Astana-64 also withdrew due to unpaid debts.

Esil Bogatyr were renamed Kyzylzhar.

On 29 January 2009, after two withdrawals, one club merger and one name change, FFK board finally decided that the 2009 season would feature 14 instead of 16 teams.

On 2 March 2009 Kazakhmys withdrew from the league due to financial difficulties caused by global economic crisis. Since there was no time to find a replacement or take any action, FFK board decided that there would be only 13 teams participating in 2009 season of Kazakhstan Premier League. However, on 5 March 2009 Kazakhmys addressed a letter to FFK revoking their decision and stating that they would guarantee financing of the club to participate in the Premier League.

=== Structural changes ===
On 20 March 2009, FFK board decided that the 2010 season will feature 12 clubs. The bottom three teams will be directly relegated while the 11th-placed team will play a relegation play-off against the runners-up of the First division.

== Team overview ==
Locations of teams in the 2009 Kazakhstan Premier League

Team	Location	Venue	Capacity
Aktobe	Aktobe	Aktobe Central Stadium	13,500
Atyrau	Atyrau	Munayshy Stadium	8,660
Irtysh	Pavlodar	Pavlodar Central Stadium	15,000
Kaisar	Kyzylorda	Gany Muratbayev Stadium	7,300
Kazakhmys	Satpaev	Kazakhmys Stadium	2,300
Kyzylzhar	Petropavl	Avangard Stadium	11,000
Lokomotiv	Astana	K. Munaitpasov Stadium, Astana	12,350
Okzhetpes	Kokshetau	Torpedo Stadium	6,000
Ordabasy	Shymkent	K. Munaitpasov Stadium, Shymkent	37,000
Shakhter	Karagandy	Shakhtyor Stadium	19,000
Taraz	Taraz	Taraz Central Stadium	12,525
Tobol	Kostanay	Kostanay Central Stadium	8,323
Vostok	Oskemen	Vostok Stadium	8,500
Zhetysu	Taldykorgan	Zhetysu Stadium	4,000

== League table ==
Pos	Team	Pld	W	D	L	GF	GA	GD	Pts	Qualification or relegation
1	Aktobe (C)	26	21	2	3	65	19	+46	65	Qualification for the Champions League second qualifying round
2	Lokomotiv (Note: Lokomotiv Astana were denied UEFA license.)	26	20	0	6	54	24	+30	60	
3	Shakhter Karagandy	26	18	3	5	50	18	+32	57	Qualification for the Europa League first qualifying round
4	Tobol	26	14	9	3	54	23	+31	51	Qualification for the Europa League first qualifying round
5	Zhetysu	26	13	5	8	33	26	+7	44	
6	Atyrau	26	11	7	8	37	29	+8	40	Qualification for the Europa League second qualifying round (Note: As winners of the 2009 Kazakhstan Cup.)
7	Ordabasy	26	10	6	10	33	30	+3	36	
8	Taraz	26	9	6	11	37	36	+1	33	
9	Irtysh Pavlodar	26	8	5	13	24	31	−7	29	
10	Vostok (Note: Vostok and Kazakhmys were both deducted three points due to unpaid debts to FFK.) (R)	26	7	5	14	32	56	−24	23	Relegation to the Kazakhstan First Division (Note: Vostok were relegated to the Kazakhstan First Division for being unable to pay off their debts.)
11	Okzhetpes (V)	26	6	4	16	22	48	−26	22	Qualification for the relegation play-off
12	Kazakhmys (R)	26	7	3	16	32	61	−29	21	Relegation to the Kazakhstan First Division
13	Kaisar (R)	26	3	5	18	15	45	−30	14	Relegation to the Kazakhstan First Division
14	Kyzylzhar (Note: Kyzylzhar were docked seven points due to unpaid debts to FFK.) (R)	26	3	4	19	14	56	−42	6	Relegation to the Kazakhstan First Division

Source: kff.kz (in Russian)
Rules for classification: 1st points; 2nd overall wins; 3rd goal difference; 4th goals scored.
(C) Champions; (R) Relegated; (V) Unrelegated

=== Relegation play-offs ===
FC Okzhetpes and FC Akzhayik from the First Division competed in a promotion/relegation play-off for one spot in the 2010 season. Akzhayik won 3–2 and were promoted to the Premier League. However, Okzhetpes were spared from relegation as well after the license of Vostok was revoked after the Oskemen club failed to pay all its debts by 30 January 2010.

8 November 2009

FC Okzhetpes	2 – 3	FC Akzhayik
Krutskevich 17'; Dosmagambetov 68'	Report	29' Avakyants; 83' (o.g.) Aliev; 90+2' Avakyants

Almaty Central Stadium, Almaty
Attendance: 500

== Results ==
Home \ Away	AKT	ATY	IRT	KSR	KZM	KYZ	LOK	OKZ	ORD	SHA	TAR	TOB	VOS	ZHE
Aktobe		2–1	3–1	3–1	4–0	6–1	0–1	1–2	1–0	2–1	2–1	5–2	4–0	1–1
Atyrau	1–0		2–0	3–2	2–1	4–1	1–2	2–0	0–0	2–0	1–1	2–2	4–2	0–2
Irtysh Pavlodar	1–2	1–0		1–0	0–2	1–0	0–1	1–0	1–2	1–1	0–0	1–2	1–1	0–2
Kaisar	0–1	1–1	0–1		0–2	0–1	0–4	2–1	1–1	0–3	0–2	1–1	0–2	2–3
Kazakhmys	2–4	1–2	2–1	1–1		1–1	3–4	1–4	1–4	1–5	1–0	0–1	3–2	2–2
Kyzylzhar	0–1	1–0	0–3	1–1	0–2		0–2	0–0	0–1	0–1	1–2	0–7	4–1	1–4
Lokomotiv	0–2	2–1	2–0	3–0	3–0	1–0		2–1	3–1	1–2	4–1	4–0	3–2	1–0
Okzhetpes	1–7	0–1	1–4	0–1	3–1	0–0	1–5		1–2	0–5	2–2	1–1	1–0	1–0
Ordabasy	1–2	1–3	2–0	2–0	1–2	1–0	1–0	4–0		0–2	1–4	1–1	1–1	0–0
Shakhter Karagandy	0–3	2–0	1–0	2–0	3–1	2–1	4–2	2–0	3–0		1–0	1–1	5–0	1–0
Taraz	1–3	1–1	1–1	2–1	5–0	5–0	1–2	0–1	0–5	1–0		0–1	2–2	2–1
Tobol	0–0	0–0	1–1	3–0	5–0	3–0	1–0	2–1	2–0	0–0	4–1		6–2	6–0
Vostok	0–4	2–2	1–3	1–0	2–1	3–1	1–2	1–0	1–0	1–3	0–2	1–2		1–0
Zhetysu	0–2	2–1	2–0	0–1	2–1	4–0	1–0	1–0	1–1	1–0	1–0	1–0	2–2	

Source: kff.kz (in Russian)
Legend: Blue = home team win; Yellow = draw; Red = away team win.

== Top goalscorers ==
Updated to games on 25 October; Source: Kazakhstan Football Federation

Rank	Player	Club	Goals
1	(Turkmenistan) Wladimir Baýramow	Tobol	18
1	(Kazakhstan) Murat Tleshev	Aktobe	18
3	(Serbia) Danilo Belić	Zhetysu	13
4	(Russia) Andrey Tikhonov	Lokomotiv	12
5	(Kazakhstan) Serhiy Kostyuk	Shakhter	11
6	(Kazakhstan) Geysar Alekperzade	Tobol/Kazakhmys	10
6	(Serbia) Ivan Perić	Shakhter	10
8	(Belarus) Dmitri Parkhachev	Ordabasy	9
8	(Russia) Denis Zubko	Atyrau	9
10	(Russia) Konstantin Golovskoy	Aktobe	8
10	(Tunisia) Toafik Salhi	Vostok	8
10	(Kazakhstan) Nurbol Zhumaskaliyev	Tobol	8
