= Emil Kenzhisariyev =

Kyrgyzstani footballer

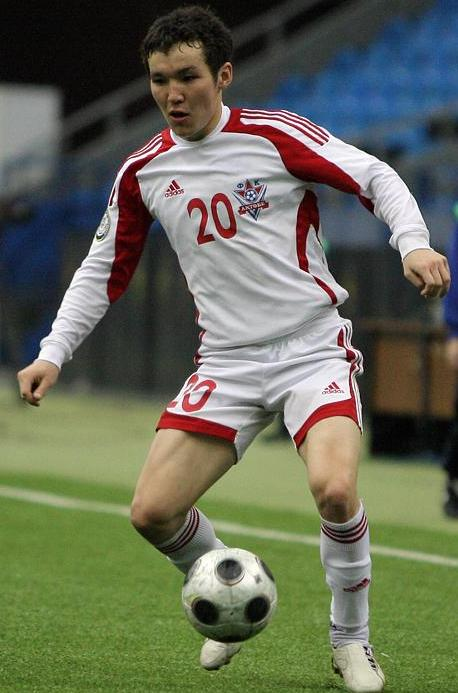

Personal information
- Full name: Emil Rinatovich Kenzhisariyev
- Date of birth: 26 March 1987 (age 39)
- Place of birth: Frunze, Kirghiz SSR, Soviet Union
- Height: 1.75 m (5 ft 9 in)
- Position: Left back

Senior career*
Years	Team	Apps	(Gls)
2003–2005	Abdish-Ata Kant	46	(21)
2005	FC Cesna	10	(6)
2006–2007	Astana	58	(8)
2008–2011	Aktobe	113	(18)
2011–2012	Bunyodkor	6	(0)
2012–2013	Aktobe	25	(3)

International career^{‡}
2004	Kyrgyzstan	3	(1)
- * Club domestic league appearances and goals as of 18 November 2014 ‡ National team caps and goals as of 18 November 2014

Emil Rinatovich Kenzhisariyev (Kyrgyz: Эмил Кенжисариев; Russian: Эмиль Ринатович Кенжисариев; born 26 March 1987) is a Kyrgyz footballer who last played for Kazakhstan Premier League club FC Aktobe as a defender. He became the top scorer of the 2010 Commonwealth of Independent States Cup, scoring six goals. He is a member of the Kyrgyzstan national football team.

== Assault ==
On 11 August 2013, Kenzhisariyev was assaulted in the Kazakh city of Almaty and was hospitalized in a coma. Reports from Kazakh media stated that he had been operated on for head injuries, and that he remained in a coma but that his condition was improving. He was eventually discharged in late September and is currently undergoing rehab training, expected to make a full recovery.

== Honours ==
=== Individual ===
- CIS Cup top goalscorer: 2010
