= FC Kyzylzhar =

Kazakh football club

Kyzylzhar
- Full name: Football Club Kyzylzhar; Қызылжар футбол клубы
- Founded: 1968; 58 years ago
- Ground: Karasai Stadium; Petropavl, Kazakhstan
- Capacity: 11,000
- Chairman: Loriya Grigoriy Otarovich
- Head coach: Ali Aliyev
- League: Premier League
- 2025: Kazakhstan Premier League, 9th of 14
- Website: qyzyljarfc.kz
Home colours	Away colours

FC Kyzylzhar (Kazakh: Қызылжар футбол клубы) is a Kazakhstani professional football club, playing in the Kazakh city of Petropavl at the Karasai Stadium. They are founding members of the Kazakhstan Premier League. Qyzyljar is the name of a district in the city. They are two time runners-up of the Premier league: In 1999 and 2000.

== History ==
=== Names ===
- 1968: Avangard
- 1970: Metallist
- 1979: Avangard
- 1990: Metallist
- 1998: Yesil
- 1999: Aksess-Yesil
- 2000: Aksess-Golden Greyn
- 2001: Yesil-Bogatyr
- 2009: Kyzylzhar

=== Domestic history ===
Season	League									Kazakhstan Cup	Top goalscorer		Manager
Season	Div.	Pos.	Pl.	W	D	L	GS	GA	P	Kazakhstan Cup	Name	League	Manager
1992	1st	19	42	18	8	16	84	67	44	1/16	(Kazakhstan) Radik Baiburin (Kazakhstan) Sergei Kondratskiy	18	(Kazakhstan) Artem Amirdzhanov
1998	2nd	4	4	0	2	2	1	4	2		(Kazakhstan) Aidar Valeyev	1	
1999	1st	2	30	23	3	4	56	19	37	Runners-up	(Kazakhstan) Igor Avdeyev	13	(Ukraine) Vladimir Strizhevskiy
2000	1st	2	28	24	2	2	59	10	74	1/2	(Kazakhstan) Igor Avdeyev	10	(Kazakhstan) Dmitriy Ogai
2001	1st	3	32	21	6	5	51	16	69	1/4	Aleksandr Shatskih	8	(Kazakhstan) Dmitriy Ogai
2002	1st	9	32	10	7	15	31	35	37	1/8	(Russia) Sergei Kondratskiy	10	(Kazakhstan) Leonid Ostroushko (Kazakhstan) Ravil Ramazanov
2003	1st	11	32	10	6	16	42	53	36	1/2	(Kazakhstan) Viktor Zubarev	7	(Ukraine) Vladimir Strizhevskiy (Kazakhstan) Oirat Saduov
2004	1st	6	36	18	5	13	53	40	59	1/8	(Armenia) Aram Voskanyan	11	(Kazakhstan) Oirat Saduov
2005	1st	7	30	15	3	12	38	25	48	1/4	(Armenia) Aram Voskanyan	9	(Kazakhstan) Oirat Saduov
2006	1st	12	30	8	9	13	20	37	33	1/8	(Armenia) Aram Voskanyan	8	(Kazakhstan) Oirat Saduov
2007	1st	11	30	8	13	9	24	28	37	1/8	(Armenia) Aram Voskanyan (Kazakhstan) Evgeniy Averchenko	5	(Kazakhstan) E.Yarovenko
2008	1st	13	30	4	12	14	21	42	24	1/4	(Armenia) Aram Voskanyan (Kazakhstan) Evgeniy Averchenko	4	(Kazakhstan) E.Yarovenko (Kazakhstan) Bolat Esmagambetov
2009	1st	14	26	3	4	19	14	56	6	1/8	(Kazakhstan) Ruslan Muhamedzhanov	3	(Kazakhstan) Bolat Esmagambetov
2010	2nd	10	34	14	4	16	44	57	46	1/16	(Kazakhstan) Stanislav Shulyak	8	(Kazakhstan) Yuriy Chuhleba
2011	2nd	14	32	8	10	14	38	54	31	1/8	(Kazakhstan) Roman Seliverstov	10	(Kazakhstan) Yuriy Chuhleba
2012	2nd	11	30	11	7	12	36	43	40	1/16	(Kazakhstan) Timur Muldinov	8	(Kazakhstan) Yuriy Chuhleba (Kazakhstan) Sergey Stoyakin
2013	2nd	4	34	20	5	9	52	35	65	1/16	(Ukraine) Oleksandr Zgura	16	(Kazakhstan) Vyacheslav Ledovskih
2014	2nd	9	28	12	1	15	41	45	37	1/8	(Georgia (country)) David Chagelishvili	10	(Kazakhstan) Eduard Glazunov (Kazakhstan) Vladimir Linchevskiy
2015	2nd	4	24	14	4	6	41	19	46	1/16	(Georgia (country)) David Chagelishvili	10	(Kazakhstan) Vladimir Fomichev
2016	2nd	3	28	14	9	5	45	25	51	1/4	(Bosnia and Herzegovina) Boško Stupić	13	(Kazakhstan) Vladimir Fomichev
2017	2nd	2	24	13	5	6	37	22	44	1/8	(Bosnia and Herzegovina) Boško Stupić	13	(Kazakhstan) Vladimir Fomichev
2018	1st	11	33	10	5	18	27	48	35	Last 16	(Kazakhstan) Timur Muldinov	8	(Bulgaria) Nikola Spasov (Kazakhstan) Andrey Kucheryavykh
2019	2nd	1	26	17	7	2	58	15	58	Group Stage	(Ukraine) Maksym Drachenko	13	(Kazakhstan) Ali Aliyev
2020	1st	9	20	6	5	9	15	24	23	-	(Kazakhstan) Timur Muldinov (Ukraine) Maksym Drachenko (Georgia (country)) Shota Grigalashvili	3	(Moldova) Veaceslav Rusnac
2021	1st	4	26	11	6	9	32	24	39	Quarterfinal	(Kazakhstan) Alibek Kasym	7	(Kazakhstan) Andrei Karpovich
2022	1st	10	26	7	9	10	33	32	30	Group Stage	(Ukraine) Yuriy Bushman (Georgia (country)) Elguja Lobjanidze	7	(Kazakhstan) Andrei Karpovich (Kazakhstan) Ali Aliyev
2023	1st	5	26	11	6	9	25	23	39	Quarter-finals	(Russia) Maksim Chikanchy (Georgia (country)) Luka Imnadze (Brazil) Pernambuco	4	(Kazakhstan) Ali Aliyev
2024	1st	9	24	8	5	11	29	26	29	Quarter-finals	(Belarus) Yevgeny Beryozkin	7	(Kazakhstan) Ali Aliyev

=== European history ===
As of match played 11 August 2022

Competition	Pld	W	D	L	GF	GA
UEFA Europa Conference League	4	1	1	2	3	3
Total	4	1	1	2	3	3

Season	Competition	Round	Club	Home	Away	Agg.
2022–23	UEFA Europa Conference League	2QR	(Croatia) Osijek	1–2	2–0	3–2
2022–23	UEFA Europa Conference League	3QR	(Cyprus) APOEL	0–0	0–1	0–1

Notes

- QR: Qualifying round

== Current squad ==
As of 5 August, 2026

Note: Flags indicate national team as defined under FIFA eligibility rules; some limited exceptions apply. Players may hold more than one non-FIFA nationality.

No.	Pos.	Nation	Player
1	GK	MDA	Dumitru Celeadnic
7	FW	KAZ	Timur Muldinov
8	MF	UKR	Yevhen Makarenko
9	FW	KAZ	Aslan Adil
10	FW	FRO	Jóannes Bjartalíð
11	FW	KAZ	Artem Cheredinov
13	FW	CMR	Stéphane Bahoken
14	DF	KAZ	Alikhan Serikbay
17	MF	KAZ	Miras Eleukin
19	MF	KAZ	Dimash Serikuly
22	DF	UKR	Anatoliy Kozlenko
23	MF	SRB	Nedeljko Piščević
26	DF	KAZ	Olzhas Kerimzhanov

No.	Pos.	Nation	Player
27	DF	KAZ	Nikita Gubarev
28	DF	SRB	Slobodan Urošević
32	GK	KAZ	Vadim Petrov
39	GK	KAZ	Sanzhar Erniyazov
52	DF	KAZ	Aleksandr Lebedev
53	GK	KAZ	Dulat Talyspaev
55	MF	UKR	Oleksandr Noyok
71	DF	KAZ	Aleksandr Sokolenko
77	FW	ALB	Liridon Latifi
79	FW	KAZ	Gleb Valgushev
88	MF	KAZ	Yury Pertsukh
96	MF	KAZ	Aybol Abiken
99	FW	CIV	Etienne Beugre

=== Out on loan ===
Note: Flags indicate national team as defined under FIFA eligibility rules; some limited exceptions apply. Players may hold more than one non-FIFA nationality.

No.	Pos.	Nation	Player
