= Teo Kardum =

Croatian footballer

Personal information
- Full name: Teo Kardum
- Date of birth: 24 July 1986 (age 40)
- Place of birth: Split, SFR Yugoslavia
- Height: 1.85 m (6 ft 1 in)
- Positions: Attacking midfielder; forward

Youth career
- 2000–2003: Hajduk Split
- 2003–2004: Dinamo Zagreb

Senior career*
Years	Team	Apps	(Gls)
2003–2006	Dinamo Zagreb	10	(3)
2004	→ Inter Zaprešić (loan)	3	(0)
2006–2007	Varteks	29	(1)
2007–2008	Libourne	19	(2)
2008	Stade Nyonnais	5	(0)
2009	Zmaj Makarska	14	(3)
2009–2010	Omladinac Vranjic		
2010–2011	Tyrnavos 2005		
2011	Omladinac Vranjic	11	(4)
2012	Kamen Ivanbegovina	11	(4)
2012–2013	Dugopolje	23	(1)
2014–2015	Uskok Klis	48	(23)
2015–2016	Jadran Tučepi		
2016–2017	Orkan Dugi Rat		
2017	ÍF Huginn	17	(5)
2018–2019	Sloga Mravince		

International career
2002	Croatia U-16	8	(9)
2002–2003	Croatia U-17	17	(5)
2003–2005	Croatia U-19	28	(8)
2006	Croatia U-20	1	(2)
- * Club domestic league appearances and goals

Téo Kardum (born 24 July 1986, in Split) is a Croatian retired association footballer.

== Club career ==
He had a season with Icelandic third tier-side ÍF Huginn.
