= Titi Essomba =

Cameroonian footballer

Personal information
- Full name: Titi Rene William Essomba
- Date of birth: 23 June 1986 (age 40)
- Place of birth: Yaoundé, Cameroon
- Height: 1.81 m (5 ft 11 1/2 in)
- Position: Striker

Team information
- Current team: OTP

Senior career*
Years	Team	Apps	(Gls)
?	Aigle Royal Menoua	?	(?)
2006–2007	AC Oulu	36	(3)
2008	RoPS	24	(5)
2009	OPS	9	(4)
2009	Taraz	14	(6)
2010–2011	Aktobe	32	(4)
2012–2013	Irtysh Pavlodar	24	(3)
2013	Taraz	25	(0)
2014	AC Oulu	22	(5)
2015	AC Kajaani	23	(4)
2016	OPS	21	(9)
2017	AC Oulu	22	(5)
2018–2019	OLS	27	(5)
2020–	OTP	3	(2)
- * Club domestic league appearances and goals as of 7 July 2020

Titi Essomba (born 2 January 1981 in Yaoundé, Cameroon) is a Cameroonian footballer who plays for AC Oulu. He has previously plied his trade for club teams in Finland and Kazakhstan.

== Career ==
In April 2014, Essomba resigned with AC Oulu, after six-years away from the club, on a one-year contract.
