= Döwran Allanazarow =

Turkmen footballer

Personal information
- Date of birth: February 23, 1986 (age 40)
- Place of birth: Turkmen SSR
- Position: Midfielder

Team information
- Current team: FC HTTU

International career
Years	Team	Apps	(Gls)
2010–2014	Turkmenistan	5	(0)

Döwran Allanazarow (born February 23, 1986) is a Turkmen footballer who is presently playing for FC HTTU and is also a former player of the Turkmenistan national football team.

His latest match was in the 2014 FIFA World Cup qualification against Indonesia.
