= 2010 Kazakhstan First Division =

Kazakhstan First Division
- Season: 2010
- Promoted: Vostok; Kaisar
- Relegated: Asbest Zhetygara
- Top goalscorer: Dauren Kusainov

The 2010 Kazakhstan First Division was the 16th edition of Kazakhstan First Division, the second level football competition in Kazakhstan. 18 teams played against each other on a home-away system. The top two teams gained promotion to the Premier League next season. The league started on May 1 and finished on October 24.

Promoted teams were FC Vostok and FC Kaisar.

== Teams ==
=== Stadia and locations ===
Location of teams in 2010 Kazakhstan First Division

| Team | Location | Venue | Capacity | Average Attendance | Head Coach | Team Captain | 2009 |
|---|---|---|---|---|---|---|---|
| Ak Bulak | Talgar | UTC CSKA | 3,000 | 383 (12.8%) | (Kazakhstan) Marat Yesmuratov | (Kazakhstan) Ibragim Baimurziyev | - |
| Aktobe-Zhas | Aktobe | ODYUSH #2 | 3,200 | 241 (7.5%) | (Kazakhstan) Samat Dzhumalishev | (Kazakhstan) Yuri Kuvakin | 11th |
| Asbest | Zhetikara | Gornyak | 5,000 | 686 (13.7%) | (Kazakhstan) Igor Scherbina | (Kazakhstan) Ruslan Nagayev | - |
| Astana-1964 | Astana | K.Munaitpasov Stadium | 12,343 | 266 (2.2%) | (Kazakhstan) Ivan Azovskiy | (Kazakhstan) Arsen Kanapiya | 3rd |
| Bolat | Temirtau | Metallurg | 15,000 | 500 (3.3%) | (Kazakhstan) Sergei Polenov | (Kazakhstan) Talgat Kabdulov | 6th |
| Caspiy | Aktau | Zhas Kanat | 5,000 | 403 (8%) | (Kazakhstan) Mels Kushanov | (Kazakhstan) Nurbek Toksanov | 10th |
| Tsesna | Almaty | Tsesna | 300 | 291 (97%) | (Kazakhstan) Samvel Kostandyan | (Kazakhstan) Vladimir Plotnikov | - |
| CSKA Almaty | Almaty | CSKA | 2,000 | 268 (13.4%) | (Kazakhstan) Oleg Trofimov | (Kazakhstan) Ivan Karkachov | - |
| Ekibastuz | Ekibastuz | Shakhter | 6,300 | 1,213 (19.3%) | (Kazakhstan) Vitali Sparyshev | (Kazakhstan) Aidyn Bralin | 8th |
| Gefest | Karaganda | Sunkar Stadium (Saran) | | 300 | (Kazakhstan) Shamil Khafizov | (Kazakhstan) Dastan Darabayev | 9th |
| Ile-Saulet | Otegen Batyr | Football Land (Almaty) | 2,000 | 310 (15.5%) | (Kazakhstan) Berik Argimbayev | (Kazakhstan) Yerkin Nurzhanov | 5th |
| Kaisar | Kyzylorda | G.Muratbayev Stadium | 7,000 | 1,975 (28.2%) | (Kazakhstan) Vladimir Linchevskiy | (Kazakhstan) Pavel Pischulin | KPL 13th |
| Kazakhmys | Satpayev | Kazakhmys | 2,300 | 1,168 | (Kazakhstan) Eduard Glazunov | (Kazakhstan) Marat Iskulov | KPL 12th |
| Kyzylzhar | Petropavl | Karasai | | 2,275 | (Kazakhstan) Yuri Chukhleba | (Kazakhstan) Andrei Selivyorstov | KPL 14th |
| Lashyn | Taraz | Zhastar | 3,000 | 269 (9%) | (Kazakhstan) Talgar Dzhunusbayev | (Kazakhstan) Yerzhan Dzhatkanbayev | 12th |
| Spartak Semey | Semey | Spartak | 11,000 | 1,725 (15.7%) | (Kazakhstan) Marat Syzdykov | (Kazakhstan) Igor Goryachev | 7th |
| Sunkar | Kaskelen | Tauelsizdik 10 zhyldygy | 2,500 | 602 (24%) | (Kazakhstan) Askar Kozhabergenov | (Kazakhstan) Zhiger Kukeyev | 4th |
| Vostok | Oskemen | Vostok | 8,500 | 1,175 (13.8%) | (Kazakhstan) Vakhid Masudov | (Kazakhstan) Maksim Zabelin | KPL 10th |

== League table ==
| Pos | Team | Pld | W | D | L | GF | GA | GD | Pts | Promotion or relegation |
|---|---|---|---|---|---|---|---|---|---|---|
| 1 | Vostok (C, P) | 34 | 27 | 6 | 1 | 91 | 15 | +76 | 87 | Promotion to the Kazakhstan Premier League |
| 2 | Kaisar (P) | 34 | 25 | 6 | 3 | 74 | 23 | +51 | 81 | Promotion to the Kazakhstan Premier League |
| 3 | Sunkar | 34 | 22 | 7 | 5 | 73 | 28 | +45 | 73 | |
| 4 | Spartak Semey | 34 | 19 | 7 | 8 | 68 | 40 | +28 | 64 | |
| 5 | Ile-Saulet | 34 | 18 | 9 | 7 | 73 | 38 | +35 | 63 | |
| 6 | Tsesna | 34 | 18 | 5 | 11 | 56 | 34 | +22 | 59 | |
| 7 | Kazakhmys | 34 | 17 | 6 | 11 | 80 | 45 | +35 | 57 | |
| 8 | Ekibastuz | 34 | 14 | 9 | 11 | 44 | 37 | +7 | 51 | |
| 9 | Ak Bulak | 34 | 14 | 9 | 11 | 48 | 39 | +9 | 51 | |
| 10 | Kyzylzhar | 34 | 14 | 4 | 16 | 44 | 57 | −13 | 46 | |
| 11 | Lashyn | 34 | 12 | 8 | 14 | 46 | 54 | −8 | 44 | |
| 12 | Aktobe-Zhas | 34 | 13 | 4 | 17 | 40 | 66 | −26 | 43 | |
| 13 | Gefest | 34 | 12 | 2 | 20 | 52 | 83 | −31 | 38 | |
| 14 | Bolat | 34 | 10 | 8 | 16 | 44 | 58 | −14 | 38 | |
| 15 | Astana-1964 | 34 | 9 | 4 | 21 | 41 | 75 | −34 | 31 | |
| 16 | Caspiy | 34 | 5 | 5 | 24 | 40 | 79 | −39 | 20 | |
| 17 | CSKA Almaty | 34 | 5 | 3 | 26 | 32 | 76 | −44 | 18 | |
| 18 | Asbest (R) | 34 | 0 | 2 | 32 | 11 | 110 | −99 | 2 | Relegation to the Kazakhstan Second Division |

Source: Soccerway (in Russian)
Rules for classification: 1st points;
Two team tiebreak: 1st overall wins; 2nd head-to-head record; 3rd goals difference; 4th goals scored; 5th away goals scored;
Multiple teams tiebreak: 1st overall wins; 2nd goals difference; 3rd goals scored; 4th away goals scored
(C) Champions; (P) Promoted; (R) Relegated
