= Jukka Santala =

Finnish footballer (born 1985)

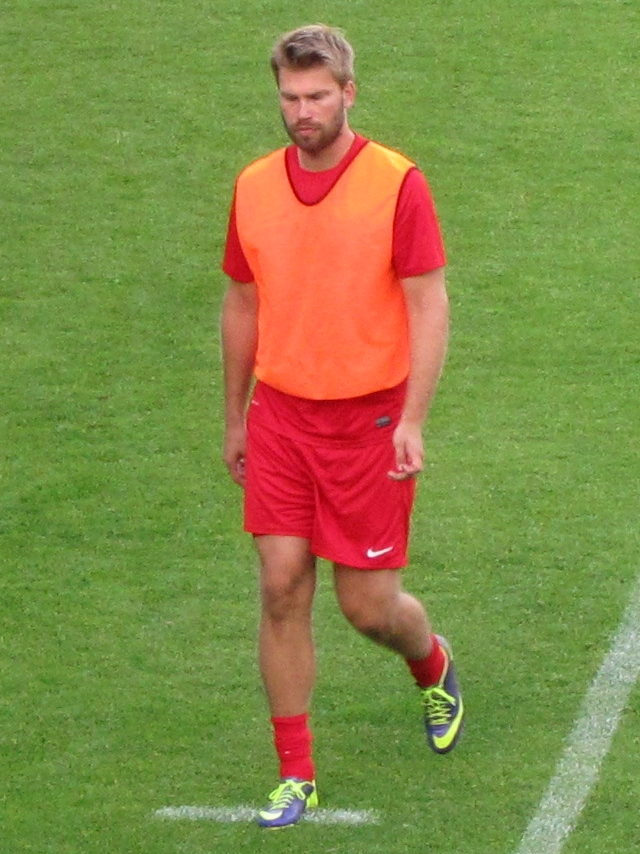
- Santala with PK-35 Vantaa in 2014

Personal information
- Date of birth: 10 September 1985 (age 41)
- Place of birth: Helsinki, Finland
- Height: 1.92 m (6 ft 3 1/2 in)
- Position: Striker

Youth career
- HJK

Senior career*
Years	Team	Apps	(Gls)
2003	Jokerit	9	(1)
2004	HJK	12	(2)
2004–2006	Rangers	0	(0)
2005	→ Partick Thistle (loan)	17	(9)
2006–2009	Nordsjælland	30	(11)
2009	Mjällby	7	(2)
2010	Haka	12	(2)
2010	RoPS	7	(3)
2011	KooTeePee	23	(13)
2012	PK-35 Vantaa	23	(9)
2013	KTP	17	(8)
2014	PK-35 Vantaa	0	(0)
Total		157	(60)
- * Club domestic league appearances and goals

Jukka Santala (born 10 September 1985) is a Finnish former footballer who played as a striker. He returned to Finland after few years playing abroad. He had a trial with the Finnish Veikkausliiga side HJK Helsinki., but he chose to take a contract from FC Haka. While contracted to Rangers in Scotland he spent a short period at Partick Thistle. He left Rangers in January 2006 to join Nordsjælland.

He has also played for Danish side FC Nordsjælland, Finnish side RoPS and Swedish Superettan side Mjällby AIF.

== Career statistics ==
As of 1 September 2024.

Appearances and goals by club, season and competition
Club	Season	League			Cups (Note: Includes Finnish League Cup and Suomen Cup)		Europe		Total	
Club	Season	Division	Apps	Goals	Apps	Goals	Apps	Goals	Apps	Goals
Jokerit	2003	Veikkausliiga	9	1	–		–		9	1
HJK	2004	Veikkausliiga	12	2	–		4 (Note: Appearances in UEFA Champions League)	0	16	2
Rangers	2004–05	Scottish Premier League	0	0	0	0	0	0	0	0
Partick Thistle (loan)	2005–06	Scottish Second Division	17	9	–		–		17	9
Nordsjælland	2005–06	Danish Superliga	12	4	–		–		12	4
Nordsjælland	2006–07	Danish Superliga	18	7	–		–		18	7
Nordsjælland	Total		30	11	0	0	0	0	30	11
Mjällby	2009	Superettan	7	2	–		–		7	2
Haka	2010	Veikkausliiga	12	2	1	0	–		13	2
RoPS	2010	Ykkönen	7	3	–		–		7	3
KooTeePee	2011	Ykkönen	24	13	–		–		24	13
PK-35 Vantaa	2012	Ykkönen	23	9	–		–		23	9
KTP	2013	Kakkonen	17	8	–		–		17	8
PK-35 Vantaa	2014	Ykkönen	18	5	1	0	–		18	5
Career total			176	65	2	0	4	0	182	65
