= Ile District, Kazakhstan =

Coordinates: 43.4272°N 77.026°E

Ile
- District
- Іле ауданы
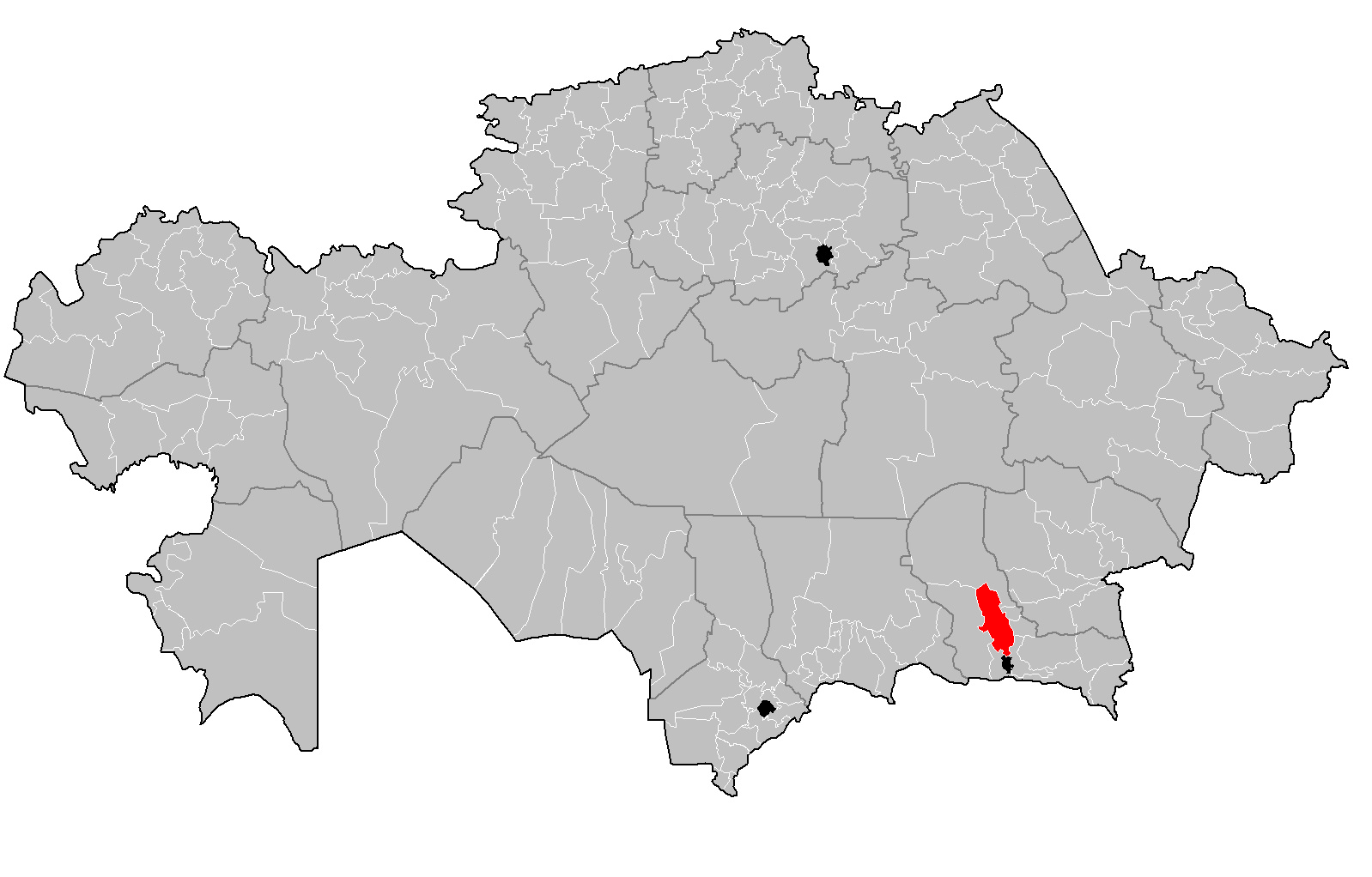
- Country: Kazakhstan
- Region: Almaty Region
- Administrative center: Otegen Batyr
- Founded: 1969

Government
  - Akim (mayor): Kairzhan Zhaksymbetov

Area
  - Total: 3,000 sq mi (7,800 km^{2})

Population (2013)
  - Total: 191,897
- Time zone: UTC+6 (East)

Ile District (Kazakh: Іле ауданы, romanized: Ile audany) is a district of Almaty Region in Kazakhstan. It was formerly known as the Iliysk District (Russian: Илийский район, romanized: Ilijskij raion). Both names refer to the importance of the Ili River in the area. Its administrative center is the settlement of Otegen Batyr. Population: 191,897 (2013 estimate); 170,695 (2009 census results); 120,725 (1999 census results).
