= FC Kazakhmys =

- Full name: FC Kazakhmys
- Founded: 2006; 19 years ago
- Dissolved: 2011
- Ground: Kazakhmys Stadium
- Capacity: 2,300
- Chairman: Nurlan Chigitaev
- Manager: Victor Dohadaylo
- League: Kazakhstan First Division
- 2010: 7th
| Home colours | Away colours |

FC Kazakhmys (Kazakh: Qazaqmys Fýtbol Klýby) is a defunct Kazakhstani football club. They were based in Satpayev, Karagandy Province. They won the First Division 2007, but were not able to start in the Premier League 2008 due to financial difficulties. In the 2008 season, the club became champion again and promoted to the Kazakhstan Premier League. In May 2011, due to lack of funds, it was announced the discontinuity of the club. In 2015, Gadaleta Investment LLP (a company registered in Bermuda) expressed its interest in taking over the relevant licence and franchise through the Molfetta Eurasia Sport Trust.

== Achievements ==
- Kazakhstan First Division: 2

2007, 2008
