= Otegen Batyr =

Otegen Batyr Өтеген батыр
- Village
- Location in Kazakhstan
- Coordinates: 43°20′0″N 77°03′0″E
- Country: Kazakhstan
- Region: Almaty Region
- District: Ile District

Population (2021 (census))
  - Total: 31,675
- Time zone: UTC+5 (Astana Time)

Otegen Batyr (Kazakh: Өтеген батыр, Ötegen Batyr) is a settlement and the administrative center of Ile District, Almaty Region, in south-eastern Kazakhstan. Population: 20,163 (2009 census results); 17,301 (1999 census results).
