= 2018 Kazakhstan Premier League =

Kazakhstan Premier League
- Season: 2018
- Champions: Astana
- Relegated: Kyzylzhar; Akzhayik
- Champions League: Astana
- Europa League: Kairat; Tobol
- Matches: 198
- Goals: 471 (2.38 per match)
- Top goalscorer: Marcos Pizzelli (18)
- All statistics correct as of 20 November 2018.

The 2018 Kazakhstan Premier League was the 27th season of the Kazakhstan Premier League, the highest football league competition in Kazakhstan. Astana defended their championship, winning the Premier League for a fifth time.

== Teams ==
FC Okzhetpes and FC Taraz were relegated at the end of the 2017 season, and were replaced by FC Zhetysu and FC Kyzylzhar.

=== Team overview ===
Locations of teams in the 2018 Kazakhstan Premier League

Team	Location	Venue	Capacity
Aktobe	Aktobe	Aktobe Central Stadium	15,000
Akzhayik	Oral	Petr Atoyan Stadium	8,320
Astana	Astana	Astana Arena	30,000
Atyrau	Atyrau	Munaishy Stadium	8,690
Irtysh	Pavlodar	Pavlodar Central Stadium	15,000
Kairat	Almaty	Almaty Central Stadium	25,057
Kaisar	Kyzylorda	Gany Muratbayev Stadium	7,500
Kyzylzhar	Petropavl	Karasai Stadium	11,000
Ordabasy	Shymkent	Kazhymukan Munaitpasov Stadium	20,000
Shakhter	Karaganda	Shakhter Stadium	20,000
Tobol	Kostanay	Kostanay Central Stadium	10,500
Zhetysu	Taldykorgan	Zhetysu Stadium	4,000

=== Personnel and kits ===
Note: Flags indicate national team as has been defined under FIFA eligibility rules. Players and Managers may hold more than one non-FIFA nationality.

Team	Manager	Captain	Kit manufacturer	Shirt sponsor
Aktobe	(Russia) Vladimir Mukhanov	(Armenia) Marcos Pizzelli	Adidas	—
Akzhayik	(Kazakhstan) Artur Avakyants	(Kazakhstan) Miram Sapanov	Adidas	—
Astana	(Ukraine) Roman Hryhorchuk	(Kazakhstan) Dmitri Shomko	Adidas	Samruk-Kazyna
Atyrau	(Russia) Viktor Kumykov	(Kazakhstan) Marat Khayrullin	Nike	—
Irtysh	(Bulgaria) Dimitar Dimitrov	(Kazakhstan) Nikita Kalmykov	Nike	ENRC
Kairat	(Spain) Carlos Alós	(Kazakhstan) Bauyrzhan Islamkhan	Nike	Halyk Bank
Kaisar	(Bulgaria) Stoycho Mladenov	(Kazakhstan) Maksat Baizhanov	Nike	—
Kyzylzhar	(Kazakhstan) Andrey Kucheryavykh	(Kazakhstan) Timur Muldinov	Nike	—
Ordabasy	(Georgia (country)) Kakhaber Tskhadadze	(Kazakhstan) Azat Nurgaliev	Nike	Aysu Mineral Water
Shakhter	(Bulgaria) Nikolay Kostov	(Kazakhstan) Evgeniy Tarasov	Nike	BTL Kazakhstan
Tobol	(Poland) Marek Zub	(Kazakhstan) Azat Nurgaliev	Adidas	Polymetal
Zhetysu	(Kazakhstan) Dmitriy Ogai	(Lithuania) Mantas Kuklys	Adidas	—

=== Foreign players ===
The number of foreign players is restricted to eight per KPL team. A team can use only five foreign players on the field in each game.

Club	Player 1	Player 2	Player 3	Player 4	Player 5	Player 6	Player 7	Player 8	Player 9
Aktobe	(Armenia) **Marcos Pizzelli**	(Brazil) Reynaldo	(Croatia) Hrvoje Miličević	(Haiti) **Jean-Eudes Maurice**	(Serbia) Saša Marjanović	(Serbia) Milan Radin	(Serbia) Aleksandar Simčević		
Akzhayik	(Croatia) Denis Glavina	(Latvia) Artūrs Karašausks	(Senegal) Malick Mané	(Ukraine) Andriy Tkachuk	(Ukraine) Yevhen Borovyk	(Ukraine) Ambrosiy Chachua	(Ukraine) **Ihor Khudobyak**	(Ukraine) Serhiy Basov	
Astana	(Azerbaijan) **Richard Almeida**	(Belarus) **Ivan Mayewski**	(Bosnia and Herzegovina) **Marin Aničić**	(Brazil) Pedro Henrique	(Croatia) **Marin Tomasov**	(Curaçao) **Rangelo Janga**	(Democratic Republic of the Congo) **Junior Kabananga**	(Hungary) **László Kleinheisler**	(Serbia) **Antonio Rukavina**
Atyrau	(Cameroon) Joseph Nane	(Croatia) Tomislav Barbarić	(Croatia) Jure Obšivač	(Nigeria) **Tunde Adeniji**	(Slovakia) František Kubík	(Serbia) Novica Maksimović	(Serbia) Predrag Sikimić	(Ukraine) Rizvan Ablitarov	
Irtysh	(Nigeria) **Gbolahan Salami**	(Portugal) Carlos Fonseca	(Romania) Adrian Avramia	(Romania) Doru Popadiuc	(Serbia) Miloš Stamenković	(Spain) Adri	(Belarus) Syarhey Kislyak		
Kairat	(Brazil) Isael	(Brazil) Juan Felipe	(Belarus) Syarhey Palitsevich	(Croatia) **Ivo Iličević**	(Hungary) **Ákos Elek**	(Hungary) **Márton Eppel**	(Russia) **Andrey Arshavin**	(Trinidad and Tobago) **Sheldon Bateau**	(Ukraine) Aderinsola Eseola
Kaisar	(Cameroon) Abdel Lamanje	(Croatia) Ivan Graf	(Ivory Coast) Franck Dja Djedjé	(Kenya) **Paul Were**	(Martinique) **Mathias Coureur**	(Sierra Leone) John Kamara	(Serbia) Bratislav Punoševac	(Ukraine) Volodymyr Arzhanov	
Kyzylzhar	(The Gambia) **Momodou Ceesay**	(Georgia (country)) **Shota Grigalashvili**	(Georgia (country)) **Giorgi Popkhadze**	(Montenegro) Uroš Delić	(Paraguay) Freddy Coronel	(Serbia) Miroslav Lečić	(Ukraine) Maksym Drachenko	(Ukraine) Oleksandr Stetsenko	
Ordabasy	(Argentina) Pablo Fontanello	(Bosnia and Herzegovina) Mirzad Mehanović	(Croatia) Luka Muženjak	(France) Helton	(Russia) Nikita Bocharov	(Senegal) Abdoulaye Diakate	(Serbia) Nemanja Kojić	(Ukraine) **Kyrylo Kovalchuk**	
Shakhter	(Armenia) Gegham Harutyunyan	(Belarus) **Alyaksandr Valadzko**	(Croatia) Mateo Mužek	(Czech Republic) Lukas Droppa	(Czech Republic) Egon Vuch	(Estonia) **Sergei Mošnikov**	(Montenegro) **Damir Kojašević**	(Ukraine) Yevhen Tkachuk	
Tobol	(Argentina) Juan Lescano	(Central African Republic) **Fernander Kassaï**	(Georgia (country)) **Jaba Kankava**	(Georgia (country)) **Nika Kvekveskiri**	(Lithuania) Artūras Žulpa	(Romania) Ionuț Larie	(Ukraine) Dmytro Nepohodov		
Zhetysu	(Armenia) **Kamo Hovhannisyan**	(Armenia) **Edgar Malakyan**	(Belarus) Andrey Lebedzew	(Belarus) Ivan Sadownichy	(Georgia (country)) Lasha Kasradze	(Ghana) David Mawutor	(Lithuania) **Mantas Kuklys**	(Ukraine) Ruslan Stepanyuk	(Uzbekistan) **Server Djeparov**

In bold: Players that have been capped for their national team.

=== Managerial changes ===
Team	Outgoing manager	Manner of departure	Date of vacancy	Position in table	Incoming manager	Date of appointment
Irtysh Pavlodar	(Ukraine) Vyacheslav Hroznyi	End of contract	16 November 2017	Pre-season	(Spain) Gerard Nus	21 December 2017
Tobol	(Russia) Robert Yevdokimov	End of contract	1 December 2017	Pre-season	(Kazakhstan) Vladimir Nikitenko	25 December 2017
Akzhayik	(Kazakhstan) Vakhid Masudov			Pre-season	(Ukraine) Volodymyr Mazyar	17 December 2017
Atyrau	(Kazakhstan) Kuanysh Kabdulov (caretaker)	End of contract		Pre-season	(Kazakhstan) Vakhid Masudov	8 January 2018
Ordabasy	(Russia) Aleksei Petrushin	End of contract		Pre-season	(Bulgaria) Georgi Dermendzhiev	11 January 2018
Shakhter Karagandy	(Lithuania) Saulius Širmelis	End of contract	31 December 2017	Pre-season	(Belarus) Uladzimir Zhuravel	9 January 2018
Atyrau	(Kazakhstan) Vakhid Masudov	Resigned	9 April 2018	12th	(Moldova) Adrian Sosnovschi	11 April 2018
Irtysh Pavlodar	(Spain) Gerard Nus	Sacked	28 April 2018	8th	(Kazakhstan) Dmitry Kuznetsov (Caretaker)	28 April 2018
Akzhayik	(Ukraine) Volodymyr Mazyar		15 May 2018	7th		
Irtysh Pavlodar	(Kazakhstan) Dmitry Kuznetsov (Caretaker)	End of Contract	13 June 2018	5th	(Kazakhstan) Oirat Saduov	13 June 2018
Shakhter Karagandy	(Belarus) Uladzimir Zhuravel	Mutual Termination	3 July 2018	10th	(Kazakhstan) Andrei Finonchenko (Caretaker)	3 July 2018
Atyrau	(Moldova) Adrian Sosnovschi	Resigned	1 July 2018	12th	(Russia) Viktor Kumykov	4 July 2018
Irtysh Pavlodar	(Kazakhstan) Oirat Saduov	Sacked	10 July 2018	9th	(Bulgaria) Dimitar Dimitrov	10 July 2018
Tobol	(Kazakhstan) Vladimir Nikitenko	Resignation	1 August 2018	3rd	(Poland) Marek Zub	6 August 2018
Kairat	(Spain) Carlos Alós	Mutual Consent	15 October 2018	2nd	(Kazakhstan) Andrei Karpovich (Caretaker)	15 October 2018

== Regular season ==
=== Table ===
Pos	Team	Pld	W	D	L	GF	GA	GD	Pts	Qualification or relegation
1	Astana (C)	33	24	5	4	66	22	+44	77	Qualification for the Champions League first qualifying round
2	Kairat	33	19	5	9	60	33	+27	62	Qualification for the Europa League first qualifying round (Note: Since the winners of 2018 Kazakhstan Cup, Kairat, qualified for European competition based on their league position, the spot awarded to the Cup winner (Europa League first qualifying round) was passed to the next best-placed team (the fourth-placed team).)
3	Tobol	33	15	8	10	36	30	+6	53	Qualification for the Europa League first qualifying round
4	Ordabasy	33	13	7	13	38	44	−6	46	Qualification for the Europa League first qualifying round
5	Kaisar	33	11	12	10	35	31	+4	45	
6	Zhetysu	33	11	10	12	36	40	−4	43	
7	Aktobe (Note: Aktobe had six points deducted on 27 April 2018 as a punishment for unpaid debts to former player Danilo Neco.)	33	13	9	11	51	47	+4	42	
8	Shakhter Karagandy	33	8	12	13	29	36	−7	36	
9	Atyrau	33	9	9	15	34	47	−13	36	
10	Irtysh Pavlodar (O)	33	10	5	18	28	45	−17	35	Qualification for the relegation play-offs
11	Kyzylzhar (R)	33	10	5	18	27	48	−21	35	Relegation to the Kazakhstan First Division
12	Akzhayik (R)	33	7	9	17	31	48	−17	30	Relegation to the Kazakhstan First Division

Source: UEFA, Soccerway
Rules for classification: 1) Points; 2) Goal difference; 3) Matches won; 4) Goals scored; 5) Away goals scored; 6) Head-to-head points; 7) Head-to-head matches won; 8) Head-to-head goal difference; 9) Head-to-head goals scored; 10) Head-to-head away goals scored; 11) Draw.
(C) Champions; (O) Play-off winners; (R) Relegated

=== Results ===
==== Games 1–22 ====
Home \ Away	AKT	AKZ	AST	ATY	IRT	KRT	KSR	KYZ	ORD	SHA	TOB	ZHE
Aktobe	—	5–3	1–1	5–1	1–1	1–1	3–1	2–0	3–1	2–0	0–1	1–1
Akzhayik	1–1	—	3–0	1–1	1–0	1–2	0–0	2–0	4–1	1–1	1–3	2–0
Astana	3–1	3–0	—	2–0	3–0	1–1	2–0	2–0	5–3	2–0	1–0	3–0
Atyrau	1–1	2–0	0–2	—	2–0	1–3	2–1	0–0	0–1	0–0	0–2	1–0
Irtysh Pavlodar	2–1	2–0	1–6	2–1	—	1–2	0–1	5–0	1–2	1–1	0–1	0–2
Kairat	3–2	3–0	1–2	2–0	4–0	—	4–1	2–1	2–0	2–0	1–0	2–1
Kaisar	0–1	1–1	0–2	0–0	0–0	1–2	—	2–1	0–0	3–0	2–2	0–0
Kyzylzhar	2–1	2–1	0–2	1–1	1–0	1–3	0–0	—	1–2	1–0	1–2	1–0
Ordabasy	3–1	2–1	1–2	0–2	1–0	2–1	1–2	2–1	—	2–1	0–1	1–2
Shakhter Karagandy	1–1	1–2	1–0	3–0	0–1	1–1	2–2	2–1	0–0	—	0–1	1–1
Tobol	2–3	1–1	0–0	3–2	1–1	1–0	0–3	0–1	1–1	0–1	—	1–0
Zhetysu	1–2	1–1	0–2	2–2	2–1	1–3	1–0	2–1	4–2	1–0	0–1	—

Legend: Blue = home team win; Yellow = draw; Red = away team win.

==== Games 23–33 ====
Home \ Away	AKT	AKZ	AST	ATY	IRT	KRT	KSR	KYZ	ORD	SHA	TOB	ZHE
Aktobe	—		1–2		2–0		0–2	1–0			3–1	2–3
Akzhayik	0–0	—	1–2				0–4	0–0			0–1	
Astana			—		4–0	3–2	0–0	3–0	1–1			3–0
Atyrau	3–1	2–1	0–1	—				3–2			2–1	
Irtysh Pavlodar		2–0		1–0	—		0–1	0–1		1–1		
Kairat	6–1	0–1		4–2	0–1	—				0–0	0–0	
Kaisar				2–2		1–2	—		2–1	2–1		1–0
Kyzylzhar						2–1	1–0	—	1–2	2–1		1–1
Ordabasy	0–0	1–0		1–0	0–2	2–0			—	1–1		
Shakhter Karagandy	0–1	1–0	3–1	2–1						—	2–1	
Tobol			1–0		1–2		0–0	3–0	1–0		—	2–2
Zhetysu		3–1		0–0	2–0	1–0			1–1	1–1		—

Legend: Blue = home team win; Yellow = draw; Red = away team win.

== Relegation play-offs ==
16 November 2018 1st leg	Kyran	0 – 3	Irtysh Pavlodar	Shymkent
15:00 (UTC+6)	D.Kuanyshbay (yellow card) 30'; S.Turekhanov (yellow card) 40'; A.Makhambetov (yellow card) 90+1'	Report	Rodrigo 9'; Shestakov 40'; A.Pazylkhan 49' (o.g.)	Stadium: Lokomotive Stadium; Attendance: 500; Referee: Aleksandr Gauzer

20 November 2018 2nd leg	Irtysh Pavlodar	2 – 1 (5 – 1 agg.)	Kyran	Pavlodar
15:00 (UTC+6)	A.Smailov 66'; Stamenković 82'	Report	S.Abzhal 76'	Stadium: Central Stadium; Attendance: 800; Referee: Georgiy Chekhovskiy

== Statistics ==
=== Scoring ===
- First goal of the season: Pavel Shabalin for Irtysh Pavlodar against Atyrau (11 March 2018)

=== Top scorers ===
As of matches played 11 November 2018

Rank	Player	Club	Goals
1	(Armenia) Marcos Pizzelli	Aktobe	18
2	(Ukraine) Aderinsola Eseola	Akzhayik/Kairat	17
3	(Croatia) Marin Tomasov	Astana	14
4	(Brazil) Isael	Kairat	12
5	(Kazakhstan) Aleksey Shchotkin	Astana	10
5	(Serbia) Bratislav Punoševac	Kaisar	10
7	(Russia) Andrey Arshavin	Kairat	9
7	(Senegal) Malick Mané	Akzhayik	9
9	(Kazakhstan) Azat Nurgaliev	Tobol	8
9	(Nigeria) Babatunde Temitope Adeniji	Atyrau	8
9	(Montenegro) Damir Kojašević	Shakhter Karagandy	8
9	(Kazakhstan) Timur Muldinov	Kyzylzhar	8
9	(Kazakhstan) Roman Murtazayev	Astana	8
9	(Ghana) Patrick Twumasi	Astana	8
9	(Kazakhstan) Marat Khairullin	Atyrau	8

=== Hat-tricks ===
Player	For	Against	Result	Date	Ref.
(Kazakhstan) Baktiyar Zaynutdinov	Astana	Irtysh Pavlodar	6–1	7 April 2018	
(Serbia) Milan Bojović	Zhetysu	Ordabasy	4–2	14 May 2018	
(Armenia) Marcos Pizzelli	Aktobe	Tobol	3–2	23 June 2018	
(Kazakhstan) Aleksey Shchotkin	Astana	Kyzylzhar	3–0	26 August 2018	

== Awards ==
=== Annual awards ===
Award	Winner	Club
Premier League Player of the Year	(Armenia) Marcos Pizzelli	Aktobe
Premier League Goalkeeper of the Year	(Kazakhstan) Nenad Erić	Astana
Premier League Manager of the Year	(Kazakhstan) Grigory Babayan	Astana
Discovery of the Season	(Kazakhstan) Bakhtiyar Zaynutdinov	Astana

Team of the Year
Goalkeeper	(Kazakhstan) Dmytro Nepohodov (Tobol)					
Defenders	(Kazakhstan) Dmitry Shomko (Astana)	(Bosnia and Herzegovina) Marin Aničić (Astana)		(Kazakhstan) Yevgeny Postnikov (Astana)	(Kazakhstan) Abzal Beysebekov (Astana)	
Midfielders	(Hungary) László Kleinheisler (Astana)	(Russia) Andrey Arshavin (Kairat)	(Kazakhstan) Bakhtiyar Zaynutdinov (Astana)	(Kazakhstan) Bauyrzhan Islamkhan (Kairat)		(Croatia) Marin Tomasov (Astana)
Forward	(Armenia) Marcos Pizzelli (Aktobe)					

== Attendances ==
#	Club	Average
1	Aktobe	8,835
2	Kairat	7,406
3	Ordabasy	4,112
4	Astana	3,800
5	Qyzyljar	3,706
6	Tobol	3,453
7	Irtysh	2,813
8	Kaysar	2,625
9	Atyrau	2,138
10	Akzhaiyk	1,800
11	Zhetysu	1,635
12	Shakhter	1,588
