= 1994 Kazakhstan Cup final =

- Event: 1994 Kazakhstan Cup
Vostok	Aktyubinets
1	0
- Date: 7 November 1994
- Venue: Central Stadium, Almaty
- Referee: Alexander Koulakov (Almaty)
- Attendance: 1,000

The 1994 Kazakhstan Cup final was the third final of the Kazakhstan Cup. The match was contested by Vostok and Aktyubinets at Central Stadium in Almaty. The match was played on 7 November 1994 and was the final match of the competition.

== Background ==
Vostok and Aktyubinets played the first Kazakhstan Cup Final.

Vostok and Aktyubinets played twice during the league season. In both matches Aktyubinets won. On June 27, 1994 Aktyubinets won the first match with the score 3-0 at the Central Stadium. Goals were scored by Dmitri Ogay, Ivan Kabakhidze and Andrei Miroshnichenko. On August 21, 1994 Aktyubinets won as visitors with the score 1-3. Goals were scored by Igor Kister, Dmitri Yurist, Andrei Miroshnichenko (all Aktyubinets) and Ruslan Duzmambetov (Vostok).

== Route to the final ==
=== Vostok ===
Round	Opposition	Score
FR	Did not participate	Not played
SR	Karachaganak (A)	w/o
QF	Ansat	0–3 (0–0 (A) / 3–0 (H))
SF	Shakhter	2–3 (1–1 (H) / 1–2 (A))
Key: (h) = Home venue; (a) = Away venue; (n) = Neutral venue.

=== Aktyubinets ===
Round	Opposition	Score
FR	Kairat	3–1 (1–0 (H) / 1–2 (A))
SR	Khimik	7–2 (5–1 (H) / 1–2 (n))
QF	SKIF-Ordabasy	4–3 (3–1 (H) / 2–1 (A))
SF	Munaishy	7–0 (3–0 (H) / 0–4 (A))
Key: (h) = Home venue; (a) = Away venue; (n) = Neutral venue.

== Match ==
=== Details ===
7 November 1994

Vostok	1–0	Aktyubinets
Avdeenko 73'	Report

Central Stadium, Almaty
Attendance: 1,000
Referee: Alexander Koulakov (Almaty)

GK	(Russia) Sergei Fuzeev
DF	(Kazakhstan) Vyacheslav Fyodorov
DF	(Kazakhstan) Oleg Shubnov
DF	(Kazakhstan) Igor Chesnokov
DF	(Kazakhstan) Igor Kiselyov	(substituted off) 86'
DF	(Kazakhstan) Murat Shoybekov	(substituted off) 81'
MF	(Kazakhstan) Sergei Saliy
MF	(Kazakhstan) Pavel Evteev
FW	(Kazakhstan) Aleksandr Antropov	(substituted off) 65'
FW	(Kazakhstan) Andrei Avdeenko
FW	(Kazakhstan) Ruslan Duzmambetov
Substitutes:
DF	(Kazakhstan) Andrei Khutornoy	(substituted on) 86'
DF	(Kazakhstan) Olzhas Boribayev	(substituted on) 81'
DF	(Kazakhstan) Ruslan Smagulov
DF	(Kazakhstan) Ilshat Mazidullin
DF	(Kazakhstan) Valeri Shushenkov
MF	(Kazakhstan) Yevgeni Popov
MF	(Kazakhstan) Igor Troeglazov	(substituted on) 65'
Manager:
(Kazakhstan) Sergei Gorokhovodatskiy

GK	(Kazakhstan) Valeri Labunets
DF	(Kazakhstan) Yuri Konkov
DF	(Kazakhstan) Vladimir Butylkin
DF	(Kazakhstan) Dmitri Ogay
DF	(Kazakhstan) Yerlan Tanzharikov
MF	(Kazakhstan) Bakhyt Kyzylbayev
MF	(Kazakhstan) Aleksandr Savchenko	(substituted off) 79'
MF	(Russia) Ivan Kabakhidze	(substituted off) 46'
MF	(Kazakhstan) Vakhid Masudov
FW	(Kazakhstan) Vladimir Kravchenko	(substituted off) 56'
FW	(Kazakhstan) Askar Kozhabergenov
Substitutes:
GK	(Kazakhstan) Nurlan Abuov
DF	(Kazakhstan) Vladimir Tunkin
MF	(Kazakhstan) Dmitri Yurist	(substituted on) 56'
MF	(Kazakhstan) Anatoli Povedenyok	(substituted on) 79'
MF	(Kazakhstan) Maksat Zholanov
FW	(Kazakhstan) Roman Luchkin	(substituted on) 46'
Manager:
(Kazakhstan) Vladimir Nikitenko

Man of the match

Match rules

- 90 minutes.
- 30 minutes of extra-time if necessary.
- Penalty shoot-out if score still even.
- Seven named substitutes.
- Maximum of three substitutions.
