= 1995 Kazakhstan Cup final =

- Event: 1995 Kazakhstan Cup
Yelimay	SKIF-Ordabasy
1	0
- Date: 7 November 1995
- Venue: Central Stadium, Almaty
- Referee: Aleksandr Mazmanyan (Almaty)
- Attendance: 1,000

The 1995 Kazakhstan Cup final was the fourth final of the Kazakhstan Cup. The match was contested by Yelimay and SKIF-Ordabasy at Central Stadium in Almaty. The match was played on 7 November 1995 and was the final match of the competition.

== Background ==
Yelimay and SKIF-Ordabasy played the first Kazakhstan Cup Final.

Yelimay and SKIF-Ordabasy was played twice during the season of league. On May 15, 1995 Yelimay won the first competition with the score 1-0 in the K. Munaitpasov Central Stadium. The lone goal was scored by Kairat Aubakirov. On September 28, 1995 Yelimay and SKIF-Ordabasy draw on 2-2. In a match noted goals - Kairat Aubakirov, Eldar Gasanov (all - "Yelimay"), Aleksei Ten and Kanat Musatayev (all - "SKIF-Ordabasy").

== Route to the Final ==
=== Yelimay ===
Round	Opposition	Score
FR	Kainar	6–2(2–2 (A)/ 4–0 (H) )
QF	Zhiger	1–4 (3–0 (H) / 1–1 (A))
SF	Taraz	2–2 (2–1 (A) / 1–0 (H))
Key: (h) = Home venue; (a) = Away venue; (n) = Neutral venue.

=== SKIF-Ordabasy ===
Round	Opposition	Score
FR	Tsesna	5–3 (1–2 (A) / 3–2 (H))
QF	Batyr	4–5 (5–1 (H) / 3–0 (A))
SF	Bulat	3–5 (3–1 (H) / 2–2 (A))
Key: (h) = Home venue; (a) = Away venue; (n) = Neutral venue.

== Match ==
=== Details ===
7 November 1995

Yelimay	1–0	SKIF-Ordabasy
Miroshnichenko 87'	Report

Central Stadium, Almaty
Attendance: 1,000
Referee: Aleksandr Mazmanyan (Almaty)

GK	(Kazakhstan) Vadim Egoshkin
DF	(Kazakhstan) Sergei Surodeev
DF	(Kazakhstan) Sergei Pasko
DF	(Kazakhstan) Boris Glushkov
DF	(Kazakhstan) Andrei Orlov	(yellow card) 70'
MF	(Kazakhstan) Anatoli Povedenok		(substituted off) 75'
MF	(Kazakhstan) Sergei Vishnyakov	(yellow card) 60'	(substituted off) 65'
MF	(Kazakhstan) Daniyar Mukanov		(substituted off) 46'
FW	(Kazakhstan) Sergei Klimov
FW	(Kazakhstan) Oleg Litvinenko
FW	(Kazakhstan) Andrei Miroshnichenko
Substitutes:
GK	(Kazakhstan) Vitali Kafanov
DF	(Kazakhstan) Albert Ilyasov
DF	(Kazakhstan) Andrei Pinchukov
MF	(Kazakhstan) Konstantin Fridental		(substituted on) 65'
MF	(Kazakhstan) Vakhid Masudov		(substituted on) 46'
FW	(Kazakhstan) Kairat Aubakirov		(substituted on) 75'
FW	(Kazakhstan) Sergei Obryadov
Manager:
(Kazakhstan) Yuri Konkov

GK	(Kazakhstan) Oleg Voskoboynikov
DF	(Kazakhstan) Kanat Musatayev
DF	(Kazakhstan) Aleksandr Yurtaev	(yellow card) 20'
DF	(Uzbekistan) Alfred Ditrikh
DF	(Kazakhstan) Kadyr Ibragimov
MF	(Kazakhstan) Dmitri Grammatikopulo
MF	(Kazakhstan) Timur Iksanov
MF	(Kazakhstan) Kairzhan Abuov	(substituted off) 80'
MF	(Kazakhstan) Serik Utebayev
FW	(Kazakhstan) Sergei Kogay	(substituted off) 46'
FW	(Uzbekistan) Vladimir Buntov	(yellow card) 70'
Substitutes:
GK	(Kazakhstan) Rinat Muftakhov
FW	(Kazakhstan) Talgat Userov
FW	(Kazakhstan) Samat Derbisbayev (substituted on) 80'
FW	(Kazakhstan) Aleksandr Maksimenko	(substituted on) 46'
FW	(Kazakhstan) Shukhrat Igamberdiyev
Manager:
(Kazakhstan) Sergei Maksimov

Man of the match

Match rules

- 90 minutes.
- 30 minutes of extra-time if necessary.
- Penalty shoot-out if scores still level.
- Seven named substitutes.
- Maximum of three substitutions.
