= 1995 Kazakhstan Cup =

Tournament details
- Country: Kazakhstan
- Teams: 16

Final positions
- Champions: Yelimay
- Runners-up: SKIF-Ordabasy

Tournament statistics
- Matches played: 25
- Goals scored: 61 (2.44 per match)
- Top goal scorer: Andrei Miroshnichenko (Yelimay) 5

The 1995 Kazakhstan Cup is the fourth season of the Kazakhstan Cup, the annual nationwide football cup competition of Kazakhstan since the independence of the country. The competition begins on 9 May 1995, and will end with the final in November 1995. Vostok are the defending champions, having won their first cup in the 1994 competition.

== First round ==
9 May 1995	Gornyak	1–1	Bulat	Gornyak Stadium, Khromtau
	Samara 89'		Eroteev 56'	Attendance: 500; Referee: Sergei Ufimtsev (Almaty)

14 May 1995	Bulat	0-0 (1-1 agg.)	Gornyak	Metallurg Stadium, Temirtau
				Attendance: 1000; Referee: Anatoli Chernov (Semey)

9 May 1995	Shakhter	2–0	Aktyubinets	Shakhter Stadium, Karagandy
	Badagulov 2'; Imankulov 8'			Attendance: 3000; Referee: Marat Ospanov (Kokshetau)

14 May 1995	Aktyubinets	1-0 (1-2 agg.)	Shakhter	Central Stadium, Aktobe
	Yurist 53'			Attendance: 3000; Referee: Aleksandr Kulakov (Almaty)

9 May 1995	Tsesna	1-2	SKIF-Ordabasy	K.Munaitpasov Stadium, Astana
	Kenetaev 19'		Ten 67'; Abuov 77'	Attendance: 1500; Referee: Bagdat Tuseev (Semey)

14 May 1995	SKIF-Ordabasy	3–2 (5-3 agg.)	Tsesna	K.Munaitpasov Central Stadium, Shymkent
	Maksimenko 59'; Kogay 61'; Derbisbayev 62'		Kucherbayev 38', 90'	Attendance: 2000; Referee: Kasymzhan Madiev (Almaty)

9 May 1995	Kainar	2-2	Yelimay	Spartak Stadium, Taldykorgan
	Tatyanin 48'; Ishenbayev 78'		Povedenok 27'; Aubakirov 32'	Attendance: 1500; Referee: Vasili Yurchenko (Aktobe)

14 May 1995	Yelimay	4-0 (6-2 agg.)	Kainar	Spartak Stadium, Semey
	Pasko 30'; Miroshnichenko 60', 89'; Fridental 78'			Attendance: 1000; Referee: Aleksandr Kostromin (Pavlodar)

9 May 1995	Munaishy	0-2	Zhiger	Munaishy Stadium, Aktau
			Ensebaev 33'; Vaganov 82'	Attendance: 2000; Referee: Yuri Mizrakhil (Almaty)

14 May 1995	Zhiger	(w/o) (+/- agg.)	Munaishy

9 May 1995	Tobol	1-1	Ansat	Stroitel Stadium, Rudny
	Irzhanov 15'		Butkov 55'	Attendance: 500; Referee: Nikolai Bublinskiy (Karagandy)

14 May 1995	Ansat	0-0 (1-1 agg.)	Tobol	Central Stadium, Pavlodar
				Attendance: 2500; Referee: Aleksandr Mazmanyan (Almaty)

9 May 1995	Batyr	3-0	Vostok	Shakhter Stadium, Ekibastuz
	Gumar 66', 85'; Makeev 73'			Attendance: 4500; Referee: Kurmanbek Urdabayev (Shymkent)

14 May 1995	Vostok	1-0 (1-3 agg.)	Batyr	Vostok Stadium, Oskemen
	Avdeenko 39'			Attendance: 750; Referee: Yevgeni Shkarin (Shymkent)

10 May 1995	Taraz	2-2	Kairat	Khimik Stadium, Taraz
	Mazbaev 20'; Stepanishchev 73'		Kainazarov 44', 75'	Attendance: 3000; Referee: Yevgeni Shkarin (Shymkent)

14 May 1995	Kairat	2-2 (-/+ agg.)	Taraz	Central Stadium, Almaty
	Zheilitbayev 73'; Rysbayev 89'		Niyazymbetov 15'; Kalabukhin 60'	Attendance: 500; Referee: Nikolai Melnikov (Shchuchinsk)

== Quarter-finals ==
3 Jule 1995	Shakhter	1-2	Bulat	Shakhter Stadium, Karagandy
	Karpov 68'		Kravchenko 25'; Erofeev 75'	Attendance: 1500; Referee: Kurmanbek Urdabayev (Shymkent)

14 Jule 1995	Bulat	1-0 (1-0 agg.)	Shakhter	Metallurg Stadium, Temirtau
	Toksanbayev 70'			Attendance: 2000; Referee: Kurmanbek Urdabayev (Shymkent)

3 Jule 1995	Ansat	0-0	Taraz	Central Stadium, Pavlodar
				Attendance: 2000; Referee: Aleksandr Borisov (Semey)

14 Jule 1995	Taraz	(w/o) (+/- agg.)	Ansat

3 Jule 1995	SKIF-Ordabasy	5–1	Batyr	K. Munaitpasov Central Stadium, Shymkent
	Yurtaev 4'; Maksimenko 8', 28'; Abuov 19'; Ibragimov 27'		Kuzmenko 54'	Attendance: 1000; Referee: Aleksandr Mazmanyan (Almaty)

14 Jule 1995	Batyr	3-0 (4-5 agg.)	SKIF-Ordabasy	Shakhter Stadium, Ekibastuz
	Zubarev 56'; Afelchenko 60' (pen.); Nurgaliev 68'			Attendance: 3000; Referee: Aleksandr Mazmanyan (Almaty)

3 Jule 1995	Yelimay	3–0	Zhiger	Spartak Stadium, Semey
	Aubakirov 36', 58'; Vishnyakov 40'			Attendance: 1000; Referee: Aleksandr Kulakov (Almaty)

14 Jule 1995	Zhiger	1-1 (1-4 agg.)	Yelimay	K. Munaitpasov Central Stadium, Shymkent
	Ensebaev 44'		Vishnyakov 31'	Attendance: 2000; Referee: Aleksandr Kulakov (Almaty)

== Semi-finals ==
5 August 1995	SKIF-Ordabasy	3-1	Bulat	K.Munaitpasov Central Stadium, Shymkent
	Maksimenko 12'; Kogay 62' (pen.) 64'		Kravchenko 18'	Attendance: 500; Referee: Yuri Mizrakhil (Almaty)

2 November 1995	Bulat	2–2 (3-5 agg.)	SKIF-Ordabasy	Metallurg Stadium, Temirtau
	Erofeev 56', 90'		Buntov 47'; Kogay 51'	Attendance: 1000; Referee: Aleksandr Borisov (Semey)

5 August 1995	Taraz	2-1	Yelimay	Khimik Stadium, Taraz
	Mazbaev 53', 73'		Miroshnichenko 3' (pen.)	Attendance: 6000; Referee: Sergei Rovenskikh (Almaty)

2 November 1995	Yelimay	1–0 (2-2 agg.)	Taraz	Spartak Stadium, Semey
	Miroshnichenko 51'			Attendance: 4000; Referee: Aleksandr Kulakov (Almaty)

== Final ==
7 November 1995

Yelimay	1–0	SKIF-Ordabasy
Miroshnichenko 87'

Central Stadium, Almaty
Attendance: 1000
Referee: Aleksandr Mazmanyan (Almaty)
