= 1994 Kazakhstan Cup =

Tournament details
- Country: Kazakhstan
- Teams: 29

Final positions
- Champions: Vostok
- Runners-up: Aktyubinets

Tournament statistics
- Matches played: 34
- Goals scored: 105 (3.09 per match)
- Top goal scorer: Andrei Miroshnichenko (Aktyubinets) 6

The 1994 Kazakhstan Cup was the third season of the Kazakhstan Cup, the annual nationwide football cup competition of Kazakhstan since the independence of the country. The competition began on 31 May 1994, and ended with the final in November 1994. Dostyk were the defending champions, having won their first cup in the 1993 competition.

== First round ==
31 May 1994	Gornyak	2–0	Kokshetau	Gornyak Stadium, Khromtau
	Rakhmanov 25'; Nikitchenko 55'			Attendance: 500; Referee: Yuri Zagorodny (Aktau)

20 Jule 1994	Kokshetau	2-1 (2-3 agg.)	Gornyak	Torpedo Stadium, Kokshetau
	Feoktistov 9'; Krivoruchko 66'		Kovalyov 20'	Attendance: 1000; Referee: Aleksandr Kulakov (Almaty)

31 May 1994	Aktyubinets	1–0	Kairat	Central Stadium, Aktobe
	Yurist 49'			Attendance: 4500; Referee: Yuri Ivashkin (Karagandy)

20 Jule 1994	Kairat	1-2 (1-3 agg.)	Aktyubinets	Central Stadium, Almaty
	Zhanuzakov 89'		Povedenok 29'; Miroshnichenko 75'	Attendance: 1000; Referee: Nikolai Melnikov (Shchuchinsk)

31 May 1994	Zhiger	10–1	Yessil	K.Munaitpasov Central Stadium, Shymkent
	Israilov 4', 32', 65'; Vaganov 12', 60'; Tubashev 41'; Morunov 48', 55', 58'; Tuganbekov 73'		Kim 86'	Attendance: 2000; Referee: Kurmanbek Urdabayev (Shymkent)

1 Jule 1994	Yessil	2-1 (3-11 agg.)	Zhiger	K.Munaitpasov Central Stadium, Shymkent
	Kasyanov 36'; Gontov 86'		Urdabayev 44' (pen.)	Attendance: 200; Referee: Kurmanbek Urdabayev (Shymkent)

31 May 1994	Yelimay	1-0	Taraz	Spartak Stadium, Semey
	Ilyasov 71'			Attendance: 5000; Referee: Grigori Sysoyev (Oskemen)

30 Jule 1994	Taraz	3-2 (3-3 agg.)	Yelimay	Khimik Stadium, Taraz
	Shmarikov 48'; Kenchimov 57' (pen.) 83' (pen.)		Aubakirov 23'; Mukhadov 34'	Attendance: 500; Referee: Kurmanbek Urdabayev (Shymkent)

31 May 1994	Ferro	2-2	Munaishy	Ferrosplavshchik Stadium, Aktobe
	Ismagulov 14'; Shishkin 90' (pen.)		Tsukanov 32'; Boyko 88'	Attendance: 300; Referee: Aleksandr Nikulin (Taldykorgan)

20 Jule 1994	Munaishy	4-2 (6-4 agg.)	Ferro	Munaishy Stadium, Aktau
	Kebisov 6' 23'; Makhambetov 73'; Blokhin 80'		Raspopov 53'; Butylkin 85'	Attendance: 250; Referee: Nikolai Sidorov (Pavlodar)

31 May 1994	Yassi	3-0	Zhalyn	Zharylgapov Stadium, Turkestan
	Karashbayev 20'; Kuralbayev 60'; Irisbayev 69'			Attendance: 1000; Referee: Vasili Yurchenko (Aktobe)

20 Jule 1994	Zhalyn	1-1 (1-4 agg.)	Yassi	Metallurg Stadium, Shymkent
	Maiorov 76'		Kazankapov 72'	Attendance: 100; Referee: Dzhurumbet Tamaberdiyev (Almaty)

2 June 1994	Kainar	2-0	Karachaganak	Spartak Stadium, Taldykorgan
	Kolesnikov 40', 73'			Attendance: 1000; Referee: Sergei Proskurin (Semey)

20 Jule 1994	Karachaganak	(w/o) (+/- agg.)	Kainar

17 Jule 1994	Batyr	1–2	Khimik	Shakhter Stadium, Ekibastuz
	Gumar 88'		Irzhanov 44'; Nizovtsev 57'	Attendance: 4000; Referee: Nikolai Bublinskiy (Karagandy)

21 Jule 1994	Khimik	2-1 (4-2 agg.)	Batyr	Trudovye Rezervy Stadium, Kostanay
	Nizovtsev 3'; Malyshev 57'		Strakhov 77'	Attendance: 500; Referee: Andrei Usov (Semey)

31 May 1994	Shakhter	(w/o) (+/- agg.)	Aksu

31 May 1994	Namys	(w/o) (+/- agg.)	Kaisar

31 May 1994	Bulat	(w/o) (+/- agg.)	Tsesna

== Second round ==
1 August 1994	Yassi	3–0	Gornyak	Zharylgapov Stadium, Turkestan
	Bolshakov 2'; Karashbayev 73'; Tulegenov 74'			Attendance: 500; Referee: Yuri Mizrakhil (Almaty)

3 August 1994	Gornyak	2-3 (2-6 agg.)	Yassi	Mashinostroitel Stadium, Kentau
	Grigorenko 7'; Rakhmanov 25'		Kuralbayev 30'; Tulegenov 52'; Karashbayev 69'	Attendance: 1000; Referee: Aleksandr Mazmanyan (Almaty)

3 August 1994	Aktyubinets	5–1	Khimik	Central Stadium, Aktobe
	Masudov 9'; Kabakhidze 43'; Povedenok 45'; Luchkin 67'; Miroshnichenko 83'		Popyrko 87'	Attendance: 4000; Referee: Kurmanbek Urdabayev (Shymkent)

4 August 1994	Khimik	1-2 (2-7 agg.)	Aktyubinets	Central Stadium, Aktobe
	Nizovtsev 53'		Luchkin 55', 68'	Attendance: 1000; Referee: Rashit Khusnutdinov (Oral)

3 August 1994	Bulat	2–2	Munaishy	Metallurg Stadium, Temirtau
	Khamidullov 28'; Pershin 48' (pen.)		Tsukanov 56'; Sargulov 59' (pen.)	Attendance: 500; Referee: Aleksandr Borisov (Semey)

5 August 1994	Munaishy	(w/o) (+/- agg.)	Bulat

3 August 1994	Zhiger	2–0	Yelimay	K.Munaitpasov Central Stadium, Shymkent
	Apsenbetov 45' 73' (pen.)			Attendance: 1000; Referee: Vladimir Donde (Almaty)

7 August 1994	Yelimay	2-0 (2-2 agg.)	Zhiger	Spartak Stadium, Semey
	Vishnyakov 73' 87' (pen.)			Attendance: 2000; Referee: Nikolai Sidorov (Pavlodar)

20 September 1994	Yelimay	1-0 (1-2 agg.)	Zhiger	Spartak Stadium, Semey
	Vishnyakov 50'			Attendance: 2000; Referee: Aleksandr Kulakov (Almaty)

3 August 1994	Karachaganak	(w/o) (-/+ agg.)	Vostok

3 August 1994	Shakhter	(w/o) (+/- agg.)	Namys

3 August 1994	SKIF-Ordabasy	(w/o) (+/- agg.)	Uralets-Arma

6 August 1994	Ansat	(w/o) (+/- agg.)	Enbek

== Quarter-finals ==
21 September 1994	Aktyubinets	3–1	SKIF-Ordabasy	Central Stadium, Aktobe
	Kravchenko 43'; Miroshnichenko 65', 77'		Ibragimov 8'	Attendance: 4000; Referee: Nikolai Obedkov (Almaty)

11 October 1994	SKIF-Ordabasy	2-1 (3-4 agg.)	Aktyubinets	K.Munaitpasov Central Stadium, Shymkent
	Buntov 6'; Shirshov 15'		Kozhabergenov 79' (pen.)	Attendance: 1000; Referee: Marat Ospanov (Kokshetau)

5 October 1994	Zhiger	0–1	Shakhter	K.Munaitpasov Central Stadium, Shymkent
			Imankulov 18'	Attendance: 1000; Referee: Nikolai Obedkov (Almaty)

22 October 1994	Shakhter	0-0 (1-0 agg.)	Zhiger	Shakhter Stadium, Karagandy
				Attendance: 300; Referee: Aleksandr Kulakov (Almaty)

8 October 1994	Ansat	0–0	Vostok	Central Stadium, Pavlodar
				Attendance: 2000; Referee: Yuri Mizrakhil (Almaty)

22 October 1994	Vostok	3-0 (3-0 agg.)	Ansat	Vostok Stadium, Oskemen
	Kiselyov 9'; Avdeenko 45'; Troeglazov 88'			Attendance: 500; Referee: Aleksandr Mazmanyan (Almaty)

21 October 1994	Yassi	3–3	Munaishy	Zharylgapov Stadium, Turkestan
	Kogay 37'; Karashbayev 77'; Dzhuanyshbayev 80'		Boyko 56', 58'; Butkov 73'	Attendance: 500; Referee: Aleksandr Borisov (Semey)

25 October 1994	Munaishy	(w/o) (+/- agg.)	Yassi

== Semi-finals ==
29 October 1994	Aktyubinets	3–0	Munaishy	Central Stadium, Aktobe
	Yurist 32'; Miroshnichenko 63'; Kozhabergenov 88'			Attendance: 3000; Referee: Sergei Gusev (Almaty)

3 November 1994	Munaishy	0-4 (0-7 agg.)	Aktyubinets	Zhastar Stadium, Aktau
			Kabakhidze 57'; Miroshnichenko 63'; Masudov 66'; Savchenko 74'	Attendance: 1000; Referee: Vladimir Donde (Almaty)

29 October 1994	Vostok	1–1	Shakhter	Vostok Stadium, Oskemen
	Shubnov 37'		Imankulov 26'	Attendance: 1000; Referee: Yuri Mizrakhil (Almaty)

3 November 1994	Shakhter	1-2 (2-3 agg.)	Vostok	Shakhter Stadium, Karagandy
	Samoilov 84'		Avdeenko 57'; Evteev 87'	Attendance: 500; Referee: Aleksandr Borisov (Semey)

== Final ==
7 November 1994

Vostok	1–0	Aktyubinets
Avdeenko 73'

Central Stadium, Almaty
Attendance: 1000
Referee: Aleksandr Kulakov (Almaty)
