= Bakhtiyar Baiseitov =

Bakhtiyar Baiseitov may refer to:

- Bakhtiyar Baiseitov (footballer) (born 1952), Kazakh football manager
- Bakhtiyar Baiseitov (wrestler) (born 1971), Kazakh Greco-Roman wrestler
