= Talgat Baysufinov =

Kazakh football player and coach

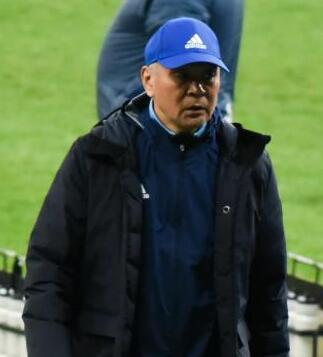
- Baysufinov in 2021

Personal information
- Full name: Talgat Maruanuly Baysufinov
- Date of birth: 4 September 1968 (age 58)
- Place of birth: Pavlodar, Kazakh SSR, Soviet Union
- Position: Midfielder

Team information
- Current team: Kaisar (manager)

International career
Years	Team	Apps	(Gls)
1992	Kazakhstan	1	(0)

Managerial career
- 2011–2014: Irtysh
- 2015–2016: Akzhayik
- 2016–2017: Kazakhstan
- 2018–2019: Kazakhstan U21
- 2020–2021: Kazakhstan
- 2025–2026: Kazakhstan
- 2026–: Kaisar

Talğat Maruanūly Baisufinov (Kazakh: Талғат Маруанұлы Байсуфинов; born 4 September 1968) is a Kazakh professional football manager and former player who is currently in charge of Kazakhstan First League club Kaisar.

== Club career ==
Baysufinov was the pupil of Pavlodar football team. According to the press, for the Pavlodar football club in 1985–1986, 1989, 1992–1995, 1998–1999, Talgat Baysufinov played 180 matches and scored 26 goals (including the Kazakhstan championship 110 games and 17 goals). Also he played for the team "Metallurg" (Ermak, today Aksu), "Yenbek" from Zhezkazgan, "Zhetysu" in Taldykorgan, "Mangistau" in Aktau, "Ekibastuz" from Ekibastuz, east from Ust-Kamenogorsk.

== International career ==
On 1 June 1992, Baysufinov made his debut for the Kazakhstan national team, replacing Vakhid Masudov in the 73rd minute of a match against Turkmenistan. It was the very first match in the history of Kazakhstan.

== Managerial career ==
He began coaching "Aksu" from Stepnogorsk, coached "Yesil-Bogatyr" in "Irtysh" on coaching since 2008. In the 2009 season he held with three matches the team: in the Kazakhstan championship team won the victory over "Okzhetpes" 4: 1 "Kyzylzhar" 1: 0, and in the Kazakhstan Cup - won "Ordabasy" 3: 0.

In the 2010 season the team led by him won the bronze medals in the championship of Kazakhstan.

In 2009, a session was held to obtain a coaching license for category A "Giraud" courses, and November 24, 2009 he passed the exam. Since Kazakhstan is no local trainers with the Pro category, the A license gives the right to work the head coach of the local Premier League.

On 18 November 2011, Baysufinov enrolled in the UEFA program «Jira», later receiving a Pro license, giving him the right to work with the top division teams and national teams. On 17 February 2014, he announced the resignation from the post of Irtysh head coach, citing health reasons.

On 17 June 2015, he was appointed head coach of Akzhayik, recently promoted to the top-tier. Baysufinov led the team in 17 matches, with a record of three wins, two draws and twelve defeats. He resigned on 19 June 2016.

Baysufinov coached the Kazakhstan national team from 2016 to 2017, from 2020 to 2021 and again from 2025 to 2026.

He was appointed head coach of the Kazakhstan under-21s on 15 January 2018.

== Managerial statistics ==
As of match played 29 March 2022

Managerial record by team and tenure
Team	From	To	Record				
Team	From	To	G	W	D	L	Win %
Kazakhstan	2020	2022	10	1	3	6	10.00
