= Viktor Kumykov =

Russian football coach (born 1963)

Personal information
- Full name: Viktor Balyutovich Kumykov
- Date of birth: 25 June 1963 (age 63)
- Place of birth: Nalchik, Russian SFSR
- Position: Goalkeeper

Team information
- Current team: Turan (manager)

Youth career
- Elbrus Nalchik

Senior career*
Years	Team	Apps	(Gls)
1981–1983	Rotor Volgograd	13	(0)
1984	Zvezda Gorodishche		
1984–1985	Spartak Armavir		
1987	Spartak Nalchik	4	(0)
1990	Etalon Baksan		

Managerial career
- 1995: Avtozapchast Baksan
- 1996–1998: Spartak Nalchik
- 2000–2002: Esil Kokshetau
- 2003: Yelimay Semey
- 2003–2004: Kaisar
- 2006: Megafon-Kavkaz Nalchik
- 2006–2007: Mash'al Mubarek
- 2008–2010: Nasaf
- 2011–2014: Shakhter Karagandy
- 2014–2015: Kazakhstan (assistant)
- 2014–2015: Ordabasy
- 2016–2018: AGMK
- 2018–2019: Atyrau
- 2020: Andijon
- 2021: Sputnik Rechitsa
- 2021–2022: Andijon
- 2022–2025: Kaisar
- 2026–: Turan
- * Club domestic league appearances and goals

Viktor Balyutovich Kumykov (Russian: Виктор Балютович Кумыков; born 25 June 1963) is a Russian professional football manager and former player. He is currently the manager of Kazakhstan First League club Turan.

== Managerial career ==
Kumykov resigned as Shakhter Karagandy manager in November 2014.

== Personal life ==
His sons Alim Kumykov and Artur Kumykov played football professionally.
