= Boris Zhuravlyov =

Russian footballer and coach (1946–2019)

Personal information
- Full name: Boris Ivanovich Zhuravlyov
- Date of birth: July 25, 1946
- Place of birth: Moscow, RSFSR, USSR
- Date of death: 23 February 2019 (aged 72)
- Place of death: Russian Federation
- Height: 1.70 m (5 ft 7 in)
- Positions: Midfielder; forward

Senior career*
Years	Team	Apps	(Gls)
1965	FC Dynamo Moscow	0	(0)
1966	FC Dynamo Stavropol		
1968	FC Dynamo Stavropol	19	(3)
1968–1969	FC Zorya Luhansk	23	(0)
1969–1970	FC Dynamo Stavropol		
1971–1972	FC Lokomotiv Moscow	66	(5)

Managerial career
- 1983–1984: Lokomotiv Moscow (assistant)
- 1985: Lokomotiv Moscow (director)
- 1988–1990: Zauralye Kurgan
- 1991: Luch Vladivostok (assistant)
- 1992: Aleks Angarsk
- 1992: Trion-Volga Tver
- 1995: Shinnik Yaroslavl (assistant)
- 1996: Rubin Kazan (assistant)
- 1997: Volga Tver (director)
- 1998: Samotlor-XXI Nizhnevartovsk
- 1999: Spartak Shchyolkovo (assistant)
- 2000: Luch Vladivostok
- 2001: Laos
- 2002: Tobol (consultant)
- 2002–2003: Luch-Energiya Vladivostok
- 2003–2004: Batys
- 2005: Spartak-MZhK Ryazan
- 2005: Tobol Kurgan
- 2008: Pskov-747 Pskov
- 2010: Petrotrest
- 2013: Petrotrest
- 2013: Dynamo Saint Petersburg
- * Club domestic league appearances and goals as of 31 December 2013

Boris Ivanovich Zhuravlyov (Russian: Борис Иванович Журавлёв; July 25, 1946 – February 23, 2019) was a Russian professional football player and coach.
