= Vitaly Zhukovsky =

Belarusian footballer and coach

Personal information
- Date of birth: 17 May 1984 (age 42)
- Place of birth: Mikhanavichy, Minsk District, Belarusian SSR, Soviet Union
- Position: Midfielder

Team information
- Current team: Turan (manager)

Youth career
- 1999: Torpedo-MAZ Minsk
- 1999–2000: RShVSM-Olympia Minsk
- 2001–2002: BATE Borisov

Senior career*
Years	Team	Apps	(Gls)
2001–2002	BATE Borisov	0	(0)

Managerial career
- 2010–2020: Isloch Minsk Raion
- 2021: BATE Borisov
- 2022–2024: Atyrau
- 2025: Turan
- 2025-: Atyrau
- * Club domestic league appearances and goals

Vitaly Zhukovsky (Belarusian: Віталь Жукоўскі, Vital' Zhukowski; Russian: Виталий Жуковский; born 17 May 1984) is a Belarusian professional football coach and a former player who is the head coach of Kazakhstani club Turan. Between 2010 and 2020, he worked as a head coach at Isloch Minsk Raion. In 2021 he was in charge of BATE Borisov.

== Career ==
Zhukovsky's playing career was cut short in late 2002 by a serious injury sustained while playing for the BATE Borisov reserve squad. After spending several years outside football, in 2010 he joined Isloch Minsk Raion, which at the time was an amateur team playing in Minsk Oblast league. Eventually Zhukovsky led Isloch to a series of promotions, leading to their debut in Belarusian Premier League in 2016.

== Managerial statistics ==
As of match played 11 January 2024

Managerial record by team and tenure
Team	Nat	From	To	Record							
Team	Nat	From	To	G	W	D	L	GF	GA	GD	Win %
Isloch Minsk Raion	(Belarus)	1 January 2010	29 December 2020	265	110	68	87	382	344	+38	41.51
BATE Borisov	(Belarus)	31 December 2020	31 December 2021	40	26	9	5	87	44	+43	65.00
Atyrau	(Kazakhstan)	22 August 2022	Present	42	12	13	17	51	65	−14	28.57
Total				347	148	90	109	520	453	+67	42.65
