= Askar Kozhabergenov =

Kazakhstani footballer (born 1965)

Personal information
- Full name: Askar Seidakhmetovich Kozhabergenov
- Date of birth: 20 September 1965 (age 61)
- Place of birth: Kazakhstan

Managerial career
- Years: Team
- 2009–2012: Sunkar
- 2014–2015: Zhetysu
- 2018–2019: Ekibastuz
- 2019: Atyrau
- 2020: Maktaaral
- 2022–2023: Khan-Tengri
- 2023–: Zhetysu

Askar Seidakhmetovich Kozhabergenov (Russian: Аскар Кожабергенов; born 20 September 1965) is a Kazakhstani football manager and former footballer who manages Zhetysu.

== Early life ==
Kozhabergenov was born in 1965 in Kazakhstan. He played basketball as a child.

== Career ==
Kozhabergenov was a Kazakhstan international. He captained the Kazakhstan national football team.

== Personal life ==
Kozhabergenov has five siblings. He has a son.
