= Oleksandr Holokolosov (football manager) =

Ukrainian football manager (born 1955)

Personal information
- Full name: Oleksandr Mykolayovych Holokolosov
- Date of birth: 1 August 1955 (age 71)
- Place of birth: Odesa, Ukraine, Soviet Union
- Position: Forward

Team information
- Current team: FC Nistru Otaci (manager)

Senior career*
Years	Team	Apps	(Gls)
1972–1974	Chornomorets-2 Odesa		
1975–1976	Portovyk Illichivsk		
1977	Dnipro Cherkasy		
1978	SKA Lviv		
1979	Sudnobudivnyk Mykolaiv		
1980–1982	Nistru Chişinău		
1982	Dynamo Kirov		
1983–1986	Avtomobilist Tiraspol		
1987	Khorezm Khonka		
1987	Netchi Chymkent		
1988	Dnipro Cherkasy		
1988	Avtomobilist Kokand		
1988	Neftchi Farg'ona		
1988	Torpedo Taganrog		
1989	Kolos Nikopol		
1989	Metallurg Lipetsk		
1989	Start Ulyanovsk		
1990	Shumen		
1991	Tulchyn		
1992	Podillia Kyrnasivka		
1992–93	Dnistrovets Bilhorod-Dnistrovsky		
1993–94	Portflot Odesa		
1993–94	Pervomayets Pervomayske		
1994–95	Rybalka Biliavka		
1995–96	Fakel Varva		
1996–97	Zakarpattia Uzhhorod		
1997–98	Odesyt Yuzhnyi		

Managerial career
- 1993–1994: Dnistrovets Bilhorod-Dnistrovsky (playing)
- 1995–1996: Fakel Varva (playing)
- 1997: Zakarpattia Uzhhorod (playing)
- 1997–1998: Odesa
- 1998–1999: Chornomorets Odesa
- 2001: Kovel-Volyn Kovel
- 2001: Constructorul Cobircou
- 2001–2002: FC Sheriff Tiraspol
- 2002–2003: Ros Bila Tserkva
- 2003–2005: Atyrau
- 2006: Dynamo-Chest Odesa
- 2007: Ivan Odesa
- 2007–2008: Vostok Oskemen
- 2013–: Nistru Otaci
- * Club domestic league appearances and goals

Oleksandr Holokolosov (Олександр Миколайович Голоколосов, Russian Romanization: Alexander Golokolosov) is a Ukrainian football manager and former Soviet player.

Holokolosov coached Sheriff Tiraspol until March 2002.

He also coached FC Vostok since July 2007.
