= FC Akzhayik =

Kazakhstani football club

Akzhaiyk Oral Aqjaiyq Oral
- Full name: Football club Akzhayik Oral; Aqjaiyq Oral Futbol Kluby
- Founded: 1968; 58 years ago
- Ground: Petr Atoyan Stadium
- Capacity: 8,320
- Chairman: Rashid Khusnutdinov
- Manager: Igor Prokhnitskiy
- League: First League
- 2024: 11th
- Website: fc-akzhayik.kz
Home colours	Away colours

FC Akzhaiyk (Kazakh: Ақжайық Орал Футбол клубы, Aqjaiyq Oral Futbol Kluby, [ɑqʐɑjɯq ɔrɑɫ futbɔɫ kəɫubɯ]) is a Kazakhstani professional football club, based in Oral, current member of the Kazakhstan First Division.

== History ==
=== Names ===
- 1968: Founded as Uralets
- 1993: The club was renamed Uralets-Arma for sponsorship reasons
- 1997: The club was renamed Zhangir
- 1998: The club was renamed Naryn
- 1999: The club was renamed Batys
- 2004: The club was renamed Akzhayik

=== Domestic history ===
Season	League									Kazakhstan Cup	Top goalscorer		Managers
Season	Div.	Pos.	Pl.	W	D	L	GS	GA	P	Kazakhstan Cup	Name	League	Managers
1992	1st	16	18	13	0	5	42	17	39				
1993	1st	15	24	14	5	5	41	12	47	Second round			
1994	1st	16	30	4	9	17	20	56	21	Second round			
1995	2nd	6	10	0	0	10	4	26	0				
1997	2nd	2	4	2	0	2	9	5	6				
1998	1st	14	26	0	3	23	11	73	3				
1999	2nd	4	3	0	1	2	1	3	1				
2000	2nd	4	8	1	1	6	3	17	4				
2001	2nd	6	4	1	0	3	2	4	3				
2002	2nd	2	24	13	4	7	36	24	43		(Kazakhstan) Avakyants	9	
2003	1st	16	32	8	2	22	25	74	26				(Russia) Zhuravlyov
2004	1st	17	36	7	4	25	24	83	25				(Russia) Zhuravlyov
2006	2nd	6	26	16	1	9	56	31	49	Round of 16			
2007	2nd	2	22	18	2	2	57	14	56	Round of 16			
2008	2nd	10	26	10	1	15	35	47	31	Round of 16			
2009	2nd	2	26	16	4	6	46	29	52	First round			
2010	1st	11	32	7	5	20	33	58	26	Third round	(Ghana) Sakyi	14	(Russia) Chernyshov
2011	2nd	4	32	16	8	8	54	30	53	Second round			(Russia) Chernyshov
2012	1st	8	26	10	4	12	34	39	34	Second round	(Belarus) Zyankovich	12	(Slovakia) Škrlík
2013	1st	12	32	7	10	15	37	50	19	Quarter-final	(Belarus) Zyankovich	9	(Armenia) Galstyan / (Serbia) Petrović
2014	2nd	5	28	16	7	5	46	24	55	First round			(Serbia) Petrović / (Kazakhstan) Volgin
2015	2nd	1	24	17	2	5	60	21	53	Second round	(Moldova) Hromțov	14	(Kazakhstan) Volgin / (Kazakhstan) Baysufinov
2016	1st	10	32	11	2	19	27	50	35	Last 16	(Paraguay) Coronel	8	(Kazakhstan) Baysufinov / (Kazakhstan) Masudov
2017	1st	10	33	7	9	17	29	47	30	Last 16	(Nigeria) Azuka	5	(Kazakhstan) Avakyants
2018	1st	12	33	7	9	17	31	48	30	Last 16	(Senegal) Mané	9	(Ukraine) Mazyar / (Kazakhstan) Avakyants
2019	2nd	3	26	16	7	3	45	21	55	Group stage			
2020	2nd	3	12	8	3	1	21	11	27	-			
2021	1st	9	26	9	5	12	25	31	32	Group stage	(Ukraine) Kovtalyuk	6	(Ukraine) Mazyar
2022	1st	14	26	6	7	13	19	31	25	Runners Up	(Georgia (country)) T.Tabatadze (Georgia (country)) L.Imnadze (Armenia) Avetisyan (Kazakhstan) Omirtayev	3	(Ukraine) Mazyar (Moldova) Picușceac (Moldova) Bejenar

== Honours ==
- Kazakhstan First Division
  - Champions (1): 2015

== Current squad ==
As of 31 May 2023

Note: Flags indicate national team as defined under FIFA eligibility rules; some limited exceptions apply. Players may hold more than one non-FIFA nationality.

No.	Pos.	Nation	Player
2	DF	BLR	Denis Yaskovich
5	DF	KAZ	Vladimir Pokatilov
6	DF	KAZ	Toreakzhal Ayip-Nurtas
9	FW	KAZ	Arman Smailov
10	FW	UKR	Mykola Ahapov
11	MF	KAZ	Rysbek Konyrov
13	DF	KAZ	Miram Sapanov
14	DF	KAZ	Bauyrzhan Omarov (captain)
17	DF	KAZ	Nikolay Zhilin
18	DF	KAZ	Ruslan Khairov
19	MF	KAZ	Maksim Gladchenko
21	MF	KAZ	Temirlan Umbetov
23	MF	KAZ	Dmitriy Akinshin

No.	Pos.	Nation	Player
25	MF	ARM	Zaven Badoyan
27	MF	KAZ	Bakdaulet Konlimkos
28	DF	KAZ	Roman Bozhko
30	GK	UKR	Rodion Syamuk
33	DF	KAZ	Salamat Gaysiev
55	GK	KAZ	Maksot Aristanov
77	DF	KAZ	Eldar Abdrakhmanov
79	MF	KAZ	Roman Chirkov
87	MF	KAZ	Islam Amangeldiev
97	MF	ARM	Vahagn Hayrapetyan
98	FW	KAZ	Adlet Bulatov
99	MF	RUS	Yevgeni Kobzar

== Managers ==
- (Russia) Boris Zhuravlyov (2003–04)
- (Kazakhstan) Bauyrzhan Baimukhammedov (2006)
- (Russia) Andrey Chernyshov (29 January 2010 – 30 June 2011)
- (Slovakia) Jozef Škrlík (16 February 2012 – 31 December 2012)
- (Armenia) Poghos Galstyan (27 February 2013 – 4 June 2013)
- (Serbia) Ljupko Petrović (14 July 2013 – 14 July 2014)
- (Kazakhstan) Sergei Volgin (14 July 2014 – 17 June 2015)
- (Kazakhstan) Talgat Baysufinov (17 July 2015 – ?)
- (Kazakhstan) Artur Avakyants (2016 ?)
- (Kazakhstan) Vakhid Masudov (2016 – December 2017)
- (Ukraine) Volodymyr Mazyar (17 December 2017 – 15 May 2018)
- (Ukraine) Serhiy Zaytsev (25 July 2018 – 20 April 2019)
- (Ukraine) Volodymyr Mazyar (12 January 2021 – 10 July 2022)
- (Moldova) Igor Picușceac (14 July 2022 – 21 August 2022)
- (Moldova) Oleg Bejenar (21 August 2022 – 31 December 2022)
- (Kazakhstan) Igor Prokhnitskiy (9 January 2023 – present)
