= Bauyrzhan Baimukhammedov =

Kazakhstani footballer and coach

Personal information
- Full name: Bauyrzhan Isauly Baimukhammedov
- Date of birth: 15 February 1948
- Place of birth: Tulkibas District, South Kazakhstan Region, Soviet Union
- Date of death: 5 April 2015 (aged 67)
- Height: 1.76 m (5 ft 9 in)
- Position: Forward

Youth career
- 1966: Kairat
- 1966–1967: Metallurg Shymkent

Senior career*
Years	Team	Apps	(Gls)
1968–1969	Metallurg Shymkent	36	(8)
1969–1970	Kairat	34	(1)
1971	Metallurg Shymkent		(4)
1972–1974	Dinamo Tselinograd		(24)
1975	Shakhter Karaganda	30	(5)
1976–1979	Zvezda Perm	114	(20)
1979	Shakhter Karaganda	29	(4)
1980–1981	Tsement Novorossyisk	28	(3)
1982	Meliorator Shymkent	34	(14)
1983–1984	Tselinnik Tselinograd	38	(3)
1987	Meliorator Shymkent	19	(3)

Managerial career
- 1989–1991: Meliorator Shymkent
- 1993: Kazakhstan U21
- 1993–1994: Tsesna Akmola
- 1994: Kazakhstan
- 1998: Shakhter Karagandy
- 1999: Dinamo Shymkent
- 2001: Dostyk Shymkent
- 2007: Akzhayik
- 2008: Ordabasy
- 2011: Caspiy
- 2013–2014: Akzhayik
- * Club domestic league appearances and goals

Bauyrzhan Isauly Baimukhammedov (Kazakh: Бауыржан Исаұлы Баймұхаммедов, Bauyrjan Isaūly Baimūhammedov; 15 February 1948 – 5 April 2015) was a Kazakh football coach.

== Career ==
He played as forward and midfielder. He started his coaching career in 1982, and managed several Kazakh and Russian professional teams. In 1994, he was the head of Kazakhstan national football team.

== Death ==
Baimukhammedov died on 5 April 2015, aged 67.
