= Alim Kumykov =

Russian footballer

Personal information
- Full name: Alim Viktorovich Kumykov
- Date of birth: 18 April 1992 (age 34)
- Height: 1.79 m (5 ft 10 in)
- Position: Midfielder

Youth career
- PFC Spartak Nalchik

Senior career*
Years	Team	Apps	(Gls)
2008–2011	PFC Spartak Nalchik	0	(0)
2012	FK Yangiyer		
2014	FC Druzhba Maykop	8	(0)
2014	FC Zhemchuzhina Yalta	1	(0)
2015	FC Kyran	0	(0)
2015	FC Berkut Armyansk		
2016	FC Kafa Feodosia		
- * Club domestic league appearances and goals

Alim Viktorovich Kumykov (Russian: Алим Викторович Кумыков; born 18 April 1992) is a former Russian football player.

== Club career ==
He made his professional debut in the 2011–12 Russian Cup for PFC Spartak Nalchik on 17 July 2011 in a game against FC Torpedo Vladimir.

== Personal life ==
His father Viktor Kumykov is a football manager, and his older brother Artur Kumykov is a footballer.
