= Artur Avakyants =

Kazakhstani footballer and manager

Personal information
- Date of birth: 30 September 1972 (age 54)
- Place of birth: Martuni, Azerbaijan SSR
- Height: 1.71 m (5 ft 7 in)
- Position: Midfielder

Team information
- Current team: Tekstilshchik Ivanovo (caretaker)

Youth career
- Akzhayik

Senior career*
Years	Team	Apps	(Gls)
1989–1990	Uralets	33	(1)
1992–1995	Uralets	87	(7)
1996–1997	Kaisar-Hurricane	32	(2)
1997–1998	Naryn	27	(5)
1999	Zhetysu	14	(1)
1999–2001	Kaisar	60	(4)
2002–2004	Akzhayik	69	(17)
2004	Caspiy		
2008–2010	Akzhayik	57	(10)

Managerial career
- 2011–2013: Akzhayik (assistant)
- 2013: Akzhayik (caretaker)
- 2013–2016: Akzhayik (assistant)
- 2016: Akzhayik (caretaker)
- 2016–2018: Akzhayik (assistant)
- 2018: Akzhayik (caretaker)
- 2018–2019: Akzhayik
- 2019–2020: Akzhayik
- 2022: Igilik FK
- 2022–2023: Peresvet Domodedovo
- 2024–: Tekstilshchik Ivanovo (assistant)
- 2024–: Tekstilshchik Ivanovo (caretaker)
- * Club domestic league appearances and goals

Artur Avakyants (born 30 September 1972) is a Kazakhstani football manager and a former player. He is the caretaker manager of the Russian club Tekstilshchik Ivanovo.

== Career ==
He played for the club FC Akzhayik.
