= Bakhtiyar Bayseitov =

Kazakh professional football coach

Personal information
- Full name: Bakhtiyar Daniyaruly Bayseitov
- Date of birth: 27 August 1952 (age 74)
- Place of birth: Shymkent, Kazakh SSR, Soviet Union

Team information
- Current team: FC Ordabasy (president)

Senior career*
Years	Team	Apps	(Gls)
- Metallurg Ordabasy

International career
1992	Kazakhstan	1	(1)

Managerial career
- 1992–1993: Kazakhstan
- 2003–2004: FC Ordabasy
- 2007: FC Atyrau
- 2015–2017: FC Ordabasy
- * Club domestic league appearances and goals

Bakhtiyar Daniyaruly Bayseitov (Kazakh: Бақтияр Даниярұлы Байсейітов, romanized: Baqtiiar Daniiarūly Baiseiıtov; born 27 August 1952) is a Kazakh professional football coach and former player.

== Early life ==
Growing up in Shymkent, Soviet Kazakhstan, he practiced football everyday to his uncle Shukur's dismay. Shukur wanted him to become a teacher or scientist instead. He continued to play even after his uncle took away his ball.

== Playing career ==
Metallurg Ordabasy, the former name of the contemporary FC Ordabasy, enlisted him in their youth system and eventually recruited him for the senior team. He was known for his goal-scoring ability. Retiring at age 33, he was in charge of the new 'Meliorator Ordabasy' in the mid-late 1980s. In the early 1990s, he became the head of FC Kairat, winning the first independent Kazakhstan Premier League in 1992.

== International career ==
As national team manager from 1992–1993, he clinched the initiatory Central Asian Cup in 1992.

== Managerial career ==
Throughout the last two years, he was the manager of FC Ordabasy. Following a turbulent period as coach, he became their president instead, giving the coach position to Aleksei Petrushin. While he was with Ordabasy, he was accused of being involved in heinous situations and match-fixing allegations, which diminished his reputation with the fans.
