= Volodymyr Mazyar =

Ukrainian footballer and manager

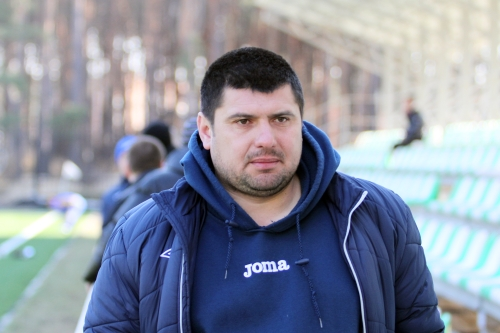

Personal information
- Full name: Volodymyr Ivanovych Mazyar
- Date of birth: 28 September 1977 (age 49)
- Place of birth: Kamianka, Iziaslav Raion, Khmelnytskyi Oblast Soviet Union (now Ukraine)
- Height: 1.83 m (6 ft 0 in)
- Position: Forward

Team information
- Current team: Akzhayik (manager)

Senior career*
Years	Team	Apps	(Gls)
1996	Skala Stryi	19	(1)
1997–1998	Hazovyk Komarno	41	(10)
1999	Dynamo Kyiv	0	(0)
1999	→ Dynamo-2 Kyiv (loan)	15	(1)
1999	→ Dynamo-3 Kyiv (loan)	8	(2)
1999–2000	Vorskla Poltava	35	(10)
1999–2000	→ Vorskla-2 Poltava (loan)	7	(1)
2001–2002	Dnipro Dnipropetrovsk	27	(5)
2001–2002	→ Dnipro-2 Dnipropetrovsk (loan)	10	(2)
2002	→ Dnipro-3 Dnipropetrovsk (loan)	2	(0)
2002	Oleksandriya	9	(1)
2003	Tavriya Simferopol	9	(0)
2003–2004	Kryvbas Kryvyi Rih	2	(0)
2003	→ Kryvbas-2 Kryvyi Rih (loan)	4	(1)
2004	→ Hoverla Uzhhorod (loan)	13	(5)
2004	Hazovyk-Skala Stryi	12	(4)
2005–2006	Stal Dniprodzerzhynsk	36	(5)
2006	Lviv	16	(3)
2007–2008	Simurq Zaqatala	55	(38)
2009	Hoverla Uzhhorod	2	(0)
2009	Arsenal Bila Tserkva	8	(1)
2010	Standard Sumgayit	14	(1)
2011	Sambir	3	(1)
Total		347	(92)

International career
1999–2000	Ukraine U21	3	(0)

Managerial career
- 2013–2015: Stal Dniprodzerzhynsk
- 2016–2017: Veres Rivne
- 2017: Rukh Vynnyky
- 2017: Polissya Zhytomyr
- 2017–2018: Akzhayik
- 2019: Hirnyk-Sport Horishni Plavni
- 2019: Lviv
- 2021–2022: Akzhayik
- 2025-: Sich Dobriany (amateurs)
- * Club domestic league appearances and goals

Volodymyr Mazyar (Ukrainian: Володимир Іванович Мазяр, born 28 September 1977) is a Ukrainian football manager and a former player. From 2021 to July 2022, he was the manager of Akzhayik in Kazakhstan. Since January 2025 he has been the manager of amateur football club Sich Dobriany in Lviv Oblast 3rd League.

== Career ==
He worked a manager for FC Akzhayik. In 2013–15, he worked a manager of the Stal Dniprodzerzhynsk. He played as a center forward.

== Career statistics ==
As of 2 August 2013

Club performance			League		Cup		Continental		Total	
Season	Club	League	Apps	Goals	Apps	Goals	Apps	Goals	Apps	Goals
Azerbaijan			League		Azerbaijan Cup		Europe		Total	
2006–07	Simurq	Azerbaijan Premier League	10	6			-		10	6
2007–08	Simurq	Azerbaijan Premier League	21	10			-		21	10
2008–09	Simurq	Azerbaijan Premier League	20	12		9	-		24	21
2009–10	Standard	Azerbaijan Premier League	11	1			-		11	1
Total	Azerbaijan		62	29		9	0	0	62	38
Career total			62	29		9	0	0	62	38
