= Ruslan Gumar =

Kazakhstani footballer

Personal information
- Full name: Ruslan Viktorovich Gumar
- Date of birth: 18 November 1973 (age 52)
- Place of birth: Kazakhstan
- Height: 1.83 m (6 ft 0 in)
- Position: Defender

Senior career*
Years	Team	Apps	(Gls)
1990–1992	FC Ekibastuzets	31	(2)
1993–1998	FC Batyr	150	(27)
1998	Lokomotiv Nizhniy Novgorod	5	(0)
1999	FC Irtysh	24	(1)
2000	Access Petropavl	20	(2)
2001–2002	Esil-Bogatyr Petropavl	45	(5)
2003–2005	FC Zhetysu	73	(9)
2006	FC Ekibastuzets	25	(4)
2007	FC Zhetysu	13	(0)
2008–2010	FC Irtysh	44	(5)
2011	FC Astana-64		

International career^{‡}
1994–2000	Kazakhstan	13	(0)
- * Club domestic league appearances and goals as of 22 December 2009 ‡ National team caps and goals as of December 2001

Ruslan Viktorovich Gumar (Russian: Руслан Викторович Гумар; born 18 November 1973) is a Kazakhstani footballer. His first club was FC Ekibastuzets.
