= Andrei Miroshnichenko =

Soviet and Russian footballer

Personal information
- Full name: Andrei Gennadyevich Miroshnichenko
- Date of birth: 21 December 1968 (age 57)
- Place of birth: Krasnodar, Russian SFSR
- Height: 1.77 m (5 ft 10 in)
- Positions: Forward; midfielder

Team information
- Current team: FC Tobol (technical director)

Youth career
- Urozhay Krasnodar

Senior career*
Years	Team	Apps	(Gls)
1986	FC Druzhba Maykop	7	(0)
1990	FC Salyut Belgorod	4	(0)
1990	FC Aktyubinets Aktyubinsk	35	(7)
1991	FC Torpedo Armavir	7	(1)
1991–1992	FC Aktyubinets Aktyubinsk	57	(17)
1993	FC Rotor Volgograd	2	(0)
1993	→ FC Rotor-d Volgograd	2	(1)
1993–1994	FC Aktyubinets Aktyubinsk	62	(39)
1995	FC Yelimay Semipalatinsk	29	(23)
1996	FC Lada Togliatti	14	(0)
1996–1999	FC Yelimay Semipalatinsk	68	(27)
1999	FC Irtysh Pavlodar	14	(7)
2000	FC Kairat	21	(5)
2001–2002	FC Aktobe	24	(9)

International career
1992–2000	Kazakhstan	21	(0)

Managerial career
- 2002–2003: FC Aktobe (assistant)
- 2002: FC Aktobe (caretaker)
- 2003: FC Aktobe (caretaker)
- 2006–2008: FC Spartak Semey
- 2009: FC Vostok Ust-Kamenogorsk
- 2010: FC Gefest
- 2010: FC Kaisar (assistant)
- 2011: FC Tarlan (assistant)
- 2012: FC Aktobe (scout)
- 2013–2015: FC Aktobe (conditioning coach)
- 2014: FC Aktobe (director of sports)
- 2018–2019: FC Tobol (assistant)
- 2018: FC Tobol (caretaker)
- 2020–: FC Tobol (technical director)
- * Club domestic league appearances and goals

Andrei Gennadyevich Miroshnichenko (Russian: Андрей Геннадьевич Мирошниченко; born 21 December 1968) is a Kazakhstani professional football coach and a former player. He is a technical director with FC Tobol.

== Club career ==
He made his professional debut in the Soviet Second League in 1986 for FC Druzhba Maykop.

== Honours ==
- Russian Premier League runner-up: 1993.
- Kazakhstan Premier League champion: 1995.
- Kazakhstan Premier League top scorer: 1995 (23 goals).
- Kazakhstani Footballer of the Year: 1995.
