= FC Atyrau =

Kazakhstani football club

Atyrau
- Full name: Football Club Atyrau; Атырау футбол клубы
- Nickname: Мұнайшылар ('The Oilers')
- Founded: 1980; 46 years ago
- Ground: Munaishy Stadium
- Capacity: 8,900
- Chairman: Alisher Apsalyamov
- Manager: Vitaly Zhukovsky
- League: Kazakhstan Premier League
- 2024: 7th
- Website: rfcatyrau.kz
Home colours	Away colours

FC Atyrau (Kazakh: Атырау футбол клубы) is a professional football club based in Atyrau, who last played in the Kazakhstan Premier League, the highest level of Kazakh football. The club's home ground is the 8,900-seat Munaishy Stadium, where they have played since their inception.

== History ==
Founded as Prikaspiets in 1980, they played only two seasons in the Soviet Second League. In 2000, the club was refounded as Akzhaiyk to play in the Kazakhstan First Division. Next season, they were promoted to the Kazakhstan Premier League with a new name Atyrau. The club colours, reflected in their badge and kit, are green and white. The club's crest is a green and white striped shield, with an oil drop in a ball form in the centre, incorporates the cities role in oil industry.

On 14 December 2016, Atyrau appointed Zoran Vulić as manager.

On 8 January 2018, Vakhid Masudov was appointed as FC Atyrau's new manager. On 9 April 2018, Masudov left Atyrau by mutual consent, with Adrian Sosnovschi being appointed as Atyrau's new manager on 11 April 2018. Adrian Sosnovschi and his coaching team resigned on 1 July 2018, with Viktor Kumykov being appointed as Atyrau's third manager of the season on 4 July 2018.

=== Names ===
- 1980 : Prikaspiyets
- 2000 : Ak Zhayk
- 2001 : Atyrau

=== Domestic history ===
Season	League									Kazakhstan Cup	Top goalscorer		Managers
Season	Div.	Pos.	Pl.	W	D	L	GS	GA	P	Kazakhstan Cup	Name	League	Managers
2001	1st	2	32	21	7	4	53	16	70		(Kazakhstan) Makayev	17	(Kazakhstan) Talgayev
2002	1st	2	32	19	6	7	43	22	63		(Kazakhstan) Kitsak	11	(Kazakhstan) Talgayev
2003	1st	4	32	16	5	11	48	42	53		(Turkmenistan) Agabaýew	14	(Ukraine) Holokolosov
2004	1st	5	36	20	11	5	49	31	71		(Russia) Eremeev	14	(Ukraine) Holokolosov
2005	1st	10	30	10	7	13	32	36	37				(Ukraine) Holokolosov / (Russia) Timofeev
2006	1st	14	30	8	5	17	25	47	29				(Russia) Averyanov
2007	1st	14	30	8	6	16	29	39	30				(Russia) Yeremeyev / (Kazakhstan) Baiseitov
2008	1st	15	30	3	10	17	22	54	19	Second round			(Kazakhstan) Volgin / (Russia) Yeremeyev / (Russia) Andreyev
2009	1st	6	26	11	7	8	37	29	40	Winners	(Russia) Zubko	9	(Kazakhstan) Shokh / (Kazakhstan) Masudov
2010	1st	5	32	13	5	14	36	44	44	Quarter-finals	(Moldova) Frunză	7	(Kazakhstan) Masudov / (Ukraine) Pasulko
2011	1st	10	32	8	10	14	28	43	24	Second round	(Kazakhstan) Danilyuk	5	(Azerbaijan) Mammadov / (Kazakhstan) Azovskiy / (Montenegro) Filipović
2012	1st	11	26	7	6	13	16	32	27	First round	(Iceland) Sigurðsson	3	(Montenegro) Filipović / (Kazakhstan) Konkov
2013	1st	8	32	10	11	11	26	38	28	First round	(Kazakhstan) Nurybekov (Kazakhstan) Shchotkin	4	(Montenegro) Radulović
2014	1st	9	32	10	7	15	30	43	25	Quarter-finals	(Serbia) Trifunović	13	(Belarus) Yurevich & (Belarus) Belyavskiy / (Kazakhstan) Nikitenko
2015	1st	5	32	11	12	9	31	33	27	Second round	(Ukraine) Arzhanov (Kazakhstan) Baizhanov	5	(Kazakhstan) Nikitenko
2016	1st	8	32	10	9	13	35	39	39	Semi-final	(Ukraine) Arzhanov	8	(Kazakhstan) Nikitenko/ (Kazakhstan) Konkov(Caretaker) / (Bulgaria) Mladenov
2017	1st	8	33	10	8	15	34	54	35	Runners-up	(Serbia) Maksimović	7	(Croatia) Vulić/ (Russia) Pavlov/ (Kazakhstan) Kabdulov (Caretaker)
2018	1st	9	33	9	9	15	34	47	36	Runners-up	(Nigeria) Adeniji	8	(Kazakhstan) Masudov / (Moldova) Sosnovschi / (Russia) Kumykov
2019	1st	11	33	6	8	19	25	58	26	Runners-up	(Russia) Abdulavov	5	(Russia) Kumykov / (Kazakhstan) Kuandulov (Caretaker) / (Belarus) Dulub
2020	2nd	2	12	8	3	1	21	11	27	-			
2021	1st	11	26	7	7	12	25	40	28	Group Stage	(Poland) Grzelczak (Brazil) Bryan	5	(Armenia) Aram Voskanyan
2022	1st	11	26	7	8	11	30	39	29	Group Stage	(Croatia) Filipović	13	(Kazakhstan) Gorovenko / (Kazakhstan) V.Bogatyrev / (Belarus) Zhukovsky
2023	1st	7	26	8	10	8	24	27	34	Semifinal	(Russia) Kozlov	8	(Belarus) Zhukovsky
2024	1st	7	24	9	8	7	28	20	35	Runners-up	(Belarus) Signevich	10	(Belarus) Zhukovsky

=== Continental history ===
As of match played 22 July 2010

Competition	GP	W	D	L	GF	GA	+/-
UEFA Cup/Europa League	6	0	1	5	1	13	-12
Total	6	0	1	5	1	13	-12

Season	Competition	Round	Club	Home	Away	Aggregate
2002–03	UEFA Cup	1Q	(Slovakia) Matador Púchov	0–0	0–2	0–2
2003–04	UEFA Cup	1Q	(Bulgaria) Levski Sofia	1–4	0–2	1–6
2010–11	UEFA Europa League	2Q	(Hungary) Győr	0–3	0–2	0–5

== Honours ==
- Kazakhstan Cup
  - Winners (1): 2009

== Current squad ==
As of 11 August 2026

Note: Flags indicate national team as defined under FIFA eligibility rules; some limited exceptions apply. Players may hold more than one non-FIFA nationality.

No.	Pos.	Nation	Player
1	GK	BLR	Yegor Khatkevich
2	DF	KAZ	Egor Tkachenko
4	MF	NGR	Mario Rabiu
5	DF	KAZ	Sanzhar Satanov
7	FW	BRA	Henrique Devens
8	MF	BIH	Mato Stanić
9	FW	KAZ	Aybar Abdulla
10	MF	KAZ	Rinat Dzhumatov
11	MF	KAZ	Asylbek Seytkaliev
12	GK	KAZ	Nurbakyt Sagat
14	FW	RUS	Konstantin Dorofeyev (on loan from Krasnodar)
15	MF	GHA	Ebenezer Ofori
17	DF	KAZ	Kuanysh Kalmuratov

No.	Pos.	Nation	Player
18	FW	KAZ	Yan Trufanov
20	MF	KAZ	Arsen Buranchiev
21	FW	KAZ	Dias Orynbasar
23	DF	KAZ	Berik Shaykhov
25	DF	KAZ	Sayat Zhumagali
27	MF	KAZ	Nurseit Berdesh
35	GK	KAZ	Nurasyl Tokhtarov
44	FW	SRB	Đorđe Maksimović
71	DF	CRO	Franjo Prce
77	FW	KAZ	Mukagali Pangerey
78	DF	BLR	Yegor Khvalko
90	FW	SRB	Đorđe Pantelić
99	MF	KAZ	Beybit Kereev

== Managers ==
- (Soviet Union) Alibek Amirov (1980–81)
- (Kazakhstan) Kairat Aimanov (2000)
- (Kazakhstan) Vait Talgayev (2000–02)
- (Ukraine) Oleksandr Holokolosov (2002–05)
- (Kazakhstan) Sergey Timofeev (2005)
- (Russia) Aleksandr Averyanov (2006)
- (Kazakhstan) Murat Munbayev (2006)
- (Ukraine) Vyacheslav Yeremeyev (2007)
- (Kazakhstan) Bakhtiyar Baiseitov (2007)
- (Kazakhstan) Sergei Volgin (2008)
- (Russia) Sergey Andreyev (2008)
- (Kazakhstan) Anton Shokh (2009)
- (Kazakhstan) Vakhid Masudov (2009–10)
- (Ukraine) Viktor Pasulko (2010)
- (Kazakhstan) Kairat Aimanov (2010)
- (Azerbaijan) Ramiz Mammadov (2010–11)
- (Montenegro) Zoran Filipović (2011–12)
- (Kazakhstan) Yuri Konkov (2012)
- (Montenegro) Miodrag Radulović (2012–13)
- (Belarus) Anatoliy Yurevich (2013–14)
- (Kazakhstan) Vladimir Nikitenko (2014–16)
- (Bulgaria) Stoycho Mladenov (2016)
- (Croatia) Zoran Vulić (2016–17)
- (Russia) Sergei Pavlov (2017)
- (Kazakhstan) Vakhid Masudov (2018)
- (Moldova) Adrian Sosnovschi (2018)
- (Russia) Viktor Kumykov (2018–19)
- (Kazakhstan) Kuanysh Kabdulov (Caretaker) (2019)
- (Belarus) Oleg Dulub (2019)
- (Kazakhstan) Kuanysh Kabdulov (Caretaker) (2019–20)
- (Armenia) Aram Voskanyan (2020–2021)
- (Kazakhstan) Konstantin Gorovenko (2021–2022)
- (Belarus) Vitaly Zhukovsky (2022-2025)
- (Kazakhstan) Konstantin Gorovenko (2025)
- (Kazakhstan) Kuanysh Kabdulov (2025)
- (Kazakhstan) Denis Mamonov (2025)
- (Belarus) Vitaly Zhukovsky (2025)
