= Kazakhstan national football team =

Men's association football team

Kazakhstan
- Nickname: Қаршығалар / Qarşyğalar (The Hawks)
- Association: Kazakhstan Football Federation (KFF)
- Confederation: AFC (Asia): 1994–2002; UEFA (Europe): 2002–present
- Head coach: Vacant
- Captain: Nuraly Alip
- Most caps: Serhiy Malyi (78)
- Top scorer: Bakhtiyar Zaynutdinov (15)
- Home stadium: Astana Arena
- FIFA code: KAZ
| First colours | Second colours |

FIFA ranking
- Current: 119 ▼2 (18 November 2026)
- Highest: 83 (September 2016)
- Lowest: 166 (May 1996)

First international
- Kazakhstan 1–0 Turkmenistan (Almaty, Kazakhstan; 1 June 1992)

Biggest win
- Pakistan 0–7 Kazakhstan (Lahore, Pakistan; 11 June 1997)

Biggest defeat
- France 8–0 Kazakhstan (Paris, France; 13 November 2021)

WAFF Championship
- Appearances: 1 (first in 2000)
- Best result: Group stage (2000)

The Kazakhstan national football team (Kazakh: Қазақстан Ұлттық футбол құрамасы, Qazaqstan Ūlttyq Futbol qūramasy, [qɑzɑqˈstɑn ʊɫt̚ˈtɤq fʊdˈboɫ qʊrɑmɑˈsə]) represents Kazakhstan in men's international football and it is governed by the Kazakhstan Football Federation. They split from the Soviet Union national team after independence in 1991 and joined the Asian Football Confederation's Central Asian Football Federation. After failing to qualify for the 1998 and 2002 FIFA World Cups, they joined UEFA, but are yet to qualify for a FIFA World Cup or a UEFA European Championship.

== History ==
=== AFC member (1992–2002) ===
The country of Kazakhstan declared independence from the Soviet Union on 16 December 1991. Its national team then split from the Soviet Union national team (a UEFA member) and joined the Asian Football Confederation. At the time, they were one of the strongest teams in Central Asia, and one of the most improving teams in Asia.

The team played their first match against another former-Soviet debutant, Turkmenistan, on 1 June 1992, as part of a Central Asian tournament. Kazakhstan won 1–0. The tournament also saw the footballing debuts of Uzbekistan, Kyrgyzstan and Tajikistan. After beating Libya in a friendly in North Korea on 3 July, Kazakhstan played the remainder of its Central Asian fixtures and avoided defeat in all of them. They beat Uzbekistan 1–0 at home on 16 July, then drew 1–1 away in Turkmenistan on 14 September, in Kyrgyzstan on 26 September and Uzbekistan on 14 October. The final match was a 2–0 home victory over Kyrgyzstan on 25 October.

Kazakhstan entered qualification for the first time in the attempt to reach the 1998 FIFA World Cup. In the first round they were placed in Group 9 alongside Pakistan and Iraq. Kazakhstan's first qualifying match was won 3–0 at home in Almaty on 11 May 1997, against Pakistan. On 6 June they travelled to Baghdad to face Iraq and won 2–1, then five days later won an away match against Pakistan, 7–0 in Lahore. The result remains Kazakhstan's biggest-ever international win. They retained their 100% start to World Cup football by beating Iraq at home 3–1 on 29 June.

In the second and final round of qualification, Kazakhstan came last in the group. Their only victory was on 18 October 1997, when they beat the United Arab Emirates 3–0 at home. Kazakhstan drew three other games – all at home (versus Uzbekistan, Japan and South Korea).

In the first round of Asian qualifying for the 2002 FIFA World Cup, Kazakhstan were placed in Group 6 alongside Iraq, Nepal and Macau. All games in the group were to be held in Almaty, Kazakhstan, after Nepal failed to organise matches in Kathmandu in March 2001. After an Iraqi protest, the first three games for each team were moved to Baghdad, Iraq.

Kazakhstan started off well in Baghdad by beating Nepal 6–0 with two goals by Oleg Litvinenko on 12 April, and Macau 3–0 two days later. On 16 April they held Iraq to a 1–1 draw in front of 50,000 spectators. Ruslan Baltiev put the Kazakhs in front in the 6th minute and Abdul-Wahab Abu Al-Hail equalised with a penalty in the 31st.

In Almaty Central Stadium, Kazakhstan beat Nepal 3–0 with two goals by Maksim Igorevich Shevchenko on 21 April. Two days later they beat Macau 5–0, Dmitriy Byakov and Igor Avdeyev each scored twice after a goalless first half. The final game on 25 April saw a 1–1 draw against Iraq in front of a 25,000-strong crowd. Litvinenko put Kazakhstan ahead in the 32nd minute but Iraq equalised ten minutes later. Despite being level on points, Iraq advanced on goal difference mainly due to a 9–1 victory over Nepal.

=== UEFA member (2002–present) ===
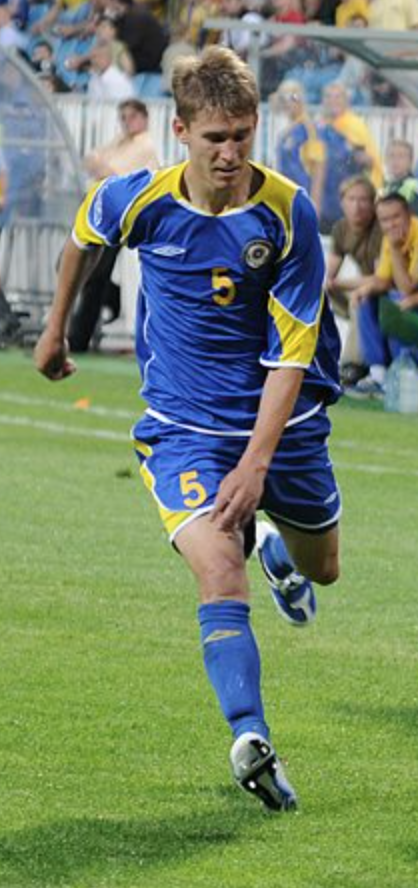
Aleksandr Kislitsyn

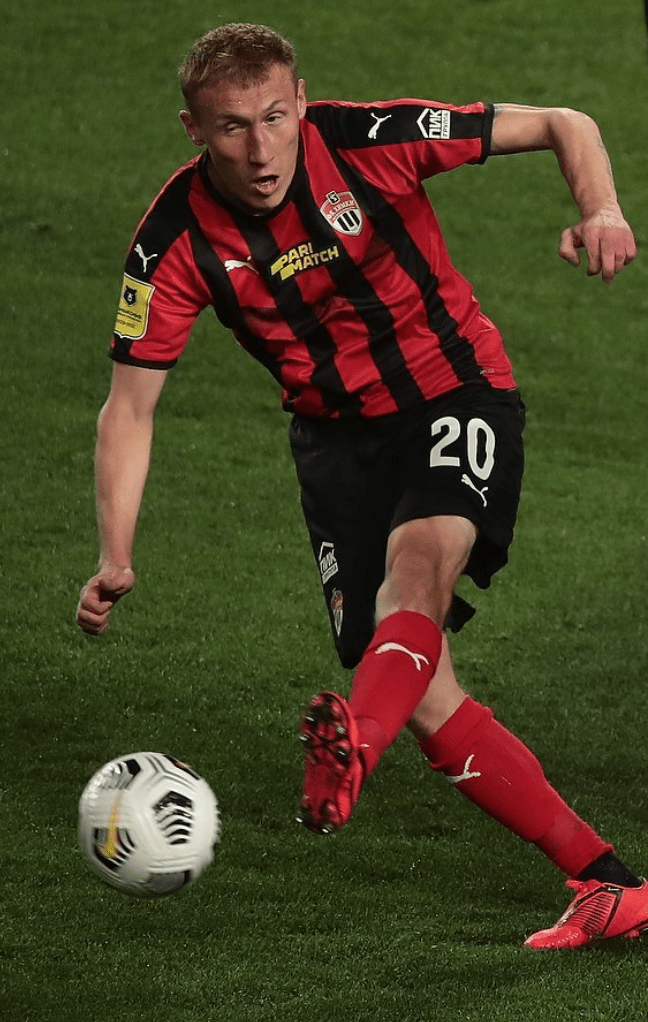
Islambek Kuat

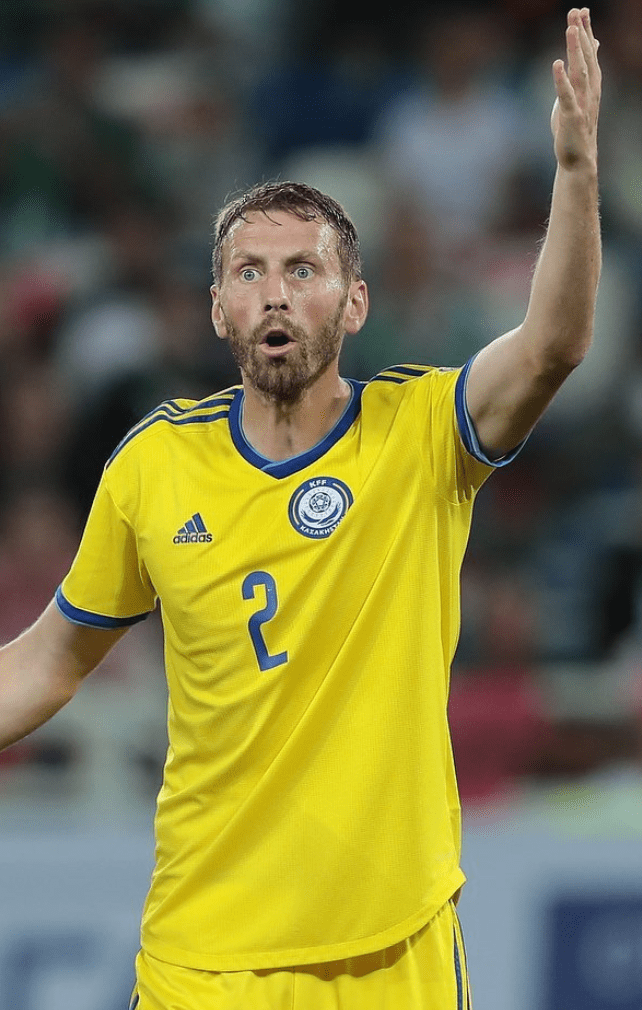
Serhiy Maliy

Being a transcontinental country, Kazakhstan joined UEFA in 2002. They had to wait until the 2002 FIFA World Cup finished on 30 June before making the switch, as they had entered the tournament as an AFC member. Kazakhstan therefore could not enter qualification for UEFA Euro 2004, as the draw had been made on 25 January 2002. Since joining UEFA, Kazakhstan has been a relative minnow within the continent, with most of their qualifications being unsuccessful and often finishing near dead last or bottom.

In the 2006 FIFA World Cup qualification, now as members of UEFA, Kazakhstan was placed in the last drawing pot with Andorra and Luxembourg, being placed in Group 2 alongside Turkey, Denmark, future UEFA Euro 2004 winners Greece, Ukraine, Georgia and Albania.

Their first official UEFA match was on 8 September 2004 and ended in a home defeat by 2–1 against Ukraine. Kazakhstan lost their next 9 matches, including a 6–0 home defeat against Turkey, their tied-biggest defeat up to 2018 and conceding a home defeat to Greece into four minutes of the stoppage time. Their sole point of the qualifying came in the next match, on 8 October 2005, in a 0–0 away draw against Georgia played behind closed doors, before losing the last match at home against Denmark.

For the UEFA Euro 2008 qualifying, Kazakhstan was once again placed in the last drawing pot. Their campaign started with two away draws against Belgium (0–0) and Azerbaijan (1–1). They lost the next three matches before getting their first official win as UEFA members in a 2–1 home triumph against Serbia with goals from Kairat Ashirbekov and Nurbol Zhumaskaliyev. After a home loss against Armenia, Kazakhstan got their sixth and seventh points after drawing again with Azerbaijan (1–1) and Belgium (2–2), both at home. Losses against Poland and Portugal were followed by their second win, this time away from home, with Sergei Ostapenko scoring the winning goal against Armenia. Their last match was a delayed game against Serbia, ending in defeat. In the end, Kazakhstan finished with 10 points and placed 6th out of the 8 Group A teams.

The 2010 FIFA World Cup qualification had Kazakhstan in the 5th of 6 drawing pots, drawn in Group 6 with Croatia, England, Ukraine, Belarus and Andorra. They started the campaign with a 3–0 home win against Andorra on 20 August 2008. However, that was the only opponent they managed to get points from, after they won the reverse fixture 3–1 on 9 September 2009 and lost all the other group matches. Kazakhstan finished 5th, ahead only of Andorra, who lost all of their matches.

Kazakhstan was drawn in the Group A of the UEFA Euro 2012 qualifying and lost the first five matches without managing to score a single goal before defeating Azerbaijan on 3 June 2011 by 2–1 with two goals from Sergey Gridin. They lost their next three games before ending the qualifying with a goalless home draw against Austria. They ended in the last place with 4 points, three behind Azerbaijan.

Following recent unimpressive qualifying campaigns, Kazakhstan was once again in the last drawing pot for the 2014 FIFA World Cup qualification. Their campaign in Group C started with two defeats before getting their first point in a goalless home draw against Austria on 12 October 2012. Losses to Austria and twice to Germany were followed by their first and only win of the qualification by 2–1 against Faroe Islands on 6 September 2013. They still got a fifth point in a 1–1 away draw against the same opponents. Kazakhstan finished in 5th place, ahead only of the Faroese.

The UEFA Euro 2016 qualifying had Kazakhstan once more in the last drawing pot. Their first match was a home 0–0 draw against Latvia on 9 September 2014, followed by six consecutive losses before another goalless draw, away from home, against Iceland. After their seventh defeat of the qualifying, Kazakhstan ended the campaign with a 1–0 away win against Latvia on 13 October 2015. The goal scored by Islambek Kuat got the Kazakhs the 5th place, tied in points with the Latvians, but with a better head-to-head record.

Once again in the last drawing pot, Kazakhstan had an unimpressive 2018 FIFA World Cup qualification campaign, failing to win a single match. After two home draws against Poland and Romania in their first three matches, Kazakhstan lost their following six matches, ending the qualifying with a 1–1 home draw against Armenia and finishing last in Group E.

For the 2018–19 UEFA Nations League, Kazakhstan was in Pot 3 of League D, the fourth and lowest division of the UEFA Nations League. Drawn in Group 1 with Georgia, Latvia and Andorra, their campaign started with a 2–0 home loss against group winners Georgia. Away draws against Andorra and Latvia had Georgia with 9 points after the three first matches, with all the other teams tied with 2 points. Kazakhstan defeated Andorra by 4–0 on 16 October, but the Georgia win against Latvia got the Georgians promoted to League C with two matches still to be played. Their sixth and last point came in a 1–1 home draw against Latvia, before being defeated by Georgia in the last group match and finishing in the second place of the group.

The UEFA Euro 2020 qualifying for Kazakhstan was unsuccessful again. However, Kazakhstan won ten points in the qualification, its best performance to date in Euro qualifying, including a shock 3–0 home win over Scotland, and a 1–1 away draw over Cyprus, though they still finished fifth at the end.

Kazakhstan played the opening match of the UEFA Euro 2024 qualifying at home against Slovenia, which they lost 2–1. In their next game against Denmark, Kazakhstan came from 2–0 down to win 3–2 in the last minutes of the match. Kazakhstan won a late victory away at Northern Ireland on 19 June 2023, with Abat Aymbetov scoring in the 88th minute from a breakaway goal. Kazakhstan remained in contention for an automatic qualification berth throughout the campaign, only losing out on the final round due to a 2–1 away defeat to Slovenia. Regardless, Kazakhstan had their best qualifying campaign to date as a UEFA member by progressing into the UEFA Euro 2024 qualifying play-offs. However, their most successful campaign ended with a 5–0 defeat against Greece in the play-offs semi-finals.

Kazakhstan played against Wales in the 2026 FIFA World Cup qualification on March 27, 2025. They initially tied 1–1 but went on to lose the game 3–1.

== Kits ==
=== Kit suppliers ===
| Period | Kit Provider |
|---|---|
| 1994–1996 | (Germany) Adidas |
| 1996–1998 | (Germany) Puma |
| 1998–1999 | (Thailand) Grand Sport |
| 1999–2000 | (Germany) Adidas |
| 2000–2002 | (United States) Nike |
| 2002–2003 | (United Kingdom) Umbro |
| 2003–2004 | (United States) Nike |
| 2004–2005 | (Germany) Puma |
| 2005–2008 | (Italy) Diadora |
| 2008–2012 | (United Kingdom) Umbro |
| 2012–2023 | (Germany) Adidas |
| 2023–2026 | (Italy) Erreà |
| 2026– | (Germany) Adidas |

Source: FootballShirtsVoltage.com

== Rivalries ==
Though currently a UEFA member, Kazakhstan's best rivalries are mostly with AFC members from Central Asia, namely Uzbekistan, Tajikistan, Kyrgyzstan and Turkmenistan. They are arguably the second best national team in Central Asia, first being Uzbekistan. The Hawks' two biggest rivals are Uzbekistan and Kyrgyzstan, which dates back from early USSR rule. These rivalries are still of great importance for many Kazakhs, since Kazakhstan does not have any real rivalry with any UEFA national team, although matches with Azerbaijan are somewhat important.

== Results and fixtures ==
The following is a list of match results in the last 12 months, as well as any future matches that have been scheduled.

Win Draw Loss Fixture

=== 2026 ===
| 25 March 2026 2026 FIFA Series | Kazakhstan | 2–0 | Namibia | Astana, Kazakhstan |
| 17:00 UTC+5 | Vorogovsky 12'; Kasym 79' | Report | | Stadium: Astana Arena; Attendance: 11,894; Referee: Viktar Shymusik (Belarus) |

| 31 March 2026 2026 FIFA Series | Kazakhstan | 1–0 | Comoros | Astana, Kazakhstan |
| 17:00 UTC+5 | Orazov 4' | Report | | Stadium: Astana Arena; Attendance: 5,341; Referee: Ishmael Barbara (Malta) |

| 6 June 2026 Friendly | Armenia | 1–1 | Kazakhstan | Yerevan, Armenia |
| 18:00 UTC+4 | Spertsyan 53' | Report | Samorodov 50' | Stadium: Vazgen Sargsyan Republican Stadium; Attendance: 8,400; Referee: Kyriakos Athanasiou (Cyprus) |

| 9 June 2026 Friendly | Hungary | 3–1 | Kazakhstan | Debrecen, Hungary |
| 19:00 UTC+2 | Szoboszlai 52'; Schäfer 67'; R. Tóth 90+3' | Report | Malyi 9' | Stadium: Nagyerdei Stadion; Attendance: 19,595; Referee: Pavle Ilić (Serbia) |

| 26 September 2026 2026–27 Nations League | Faroe Islands | 1–1 | Kazakhstan | Tórshavn, Faroe Islands |
| 17:00 UTC+1 | Samuelsen 14' | Report | Yerlanov 26' | Stadium: Tórsvøllur; Attendance: 2,458; Referee: Ishmael Barbara (Malta) |

| 29 September 2026 2026–27 Nations League | Slovakia | 2–1 | Kazakhstan | Košice, Slovakia |
| 20:45 UTC+2 | L. Sauer 26'; Hancko 82' | Report | Karimov 35' | Stadium: Košická futbalová aréna Attendance: 9,109; Referee: Patrik Kolarić (Croatia) |

| 2 October 2026 2026–27 Nations League | Kazakhstan | 1–2 | Moldova | Astana, Kazakhstan |
| 19:00 UTC+5 | Alip 64' | Report | Cleșcenco 45+1'; Popescu 50' | Stadium: Astana Arena; Attendance: 20,119; Referee: Marian Barbu (Romania) |

| 6 October 2026 2026–27 Nations League | Kazakhstan | 2–2 | Faroe Islands | Astana, Kazakhstan |
| 19:00 UTC+5 | Malyi 68' (red card) 85'; Alip 76' | Report | Knudsen 22'; Turi 6'; Agnarsson (yellow card) 52' (yellow-red card) 65' | Stadium: Astana Arena; Attendance: 10,315; Referee: Kristo Tohver (Estonia) |

| 13 November 2026 2026–27 Nations League | Moldova | 2–1 | Kazakhstan | Chișinău, Moldova |
| 21:45 UTC+2 | Popescu 39', 77' | Report | Chesnokov 51' | Stadium: Stadionul Zimbru; Attendance: 6,783; Referee: Andrea Colombo (Italy) |

| 16 November 2026 2026–27 Nations League | Kazakhstan | 2–2 | Slovakia | Astana, Kazakhstan |
| 20:00 UTC+5 | Chesnokov 29'; Vorogovsky 65' | Report | Boženík 56'; Kaprálik 90+5' | Stadium: Astana Arena; Attendance: 13,244; Referee: Aliyar Aghayev (Azerbaijan) |

== Current staff ==
Technical Staff
| Position | Name |
|---|---|
| Head coach | Vacant |
| Assistant Head Coach | Nurbol Zhumaskaliyev Yuriy Chukhleba Yeldos Akhmetov |
| Goalkeeper Coach | Oleg Voskoboynikov |
| Coach-Analyst | Magomed Nozadze |
| Fitness Coach | Maxim Zuev |

=== Coaching history ===
As of 20 November 2026.

| Manager | Period | Played | Won | Drawn | Lost | Win % |
|---|---|---|---|---|---|---|
| (Kazakhstan) Bakhtiyar Baiseitov | 1992 | 7 | 4 | 3 | 0 | 57.14 |
| (Kazakhstan) Bauyrzhan Baimukhammedov | 1994 | 4 | 1 | 2 | 1 | 25.00 |
| (Kazakhstan) Serik Berdalin | 1995–1997 | 20 | 6 | 4 | 10 | 30.00 |
| (Kazakhstan) Sergei Gorokhovadatskiy | 1998 | 5 | 2 | 1 | 2 | 40.00 |
| (Kazakhstan) Vait Talgayev | 2000 | 9 | 5 | 0 | 4 | 55.56 |
| (Kazakhstan) Vladimir Fomichyov (caretaker) | 2000 | 1 | 0 | 0 | 1 | 0.00 |
| (Kazakhstan) Vakhid Masudov | 2001–2002 | 9 | 4 | 4 | 1 | 44.44 |
| (Russia) Leonid Pakhomov | 2003–2004 | 9 | 0 | 2 | 7 | 0.00 |
| (Kazakhstan) Sergey Timofeev | 2004–2005 | 13 | 0 | 1 | 12 | 0.00 |
| (Netherlands) Arno Pijpers | 2006–2008 | 36 | 7 | 11 | 18 | 19.44 |
| (Germany) Bernd Storck | 2008–2010 | 14 | 3 | 0 | 11 | 21.43 |
| (Czech Republic) Miroslav Beránek | 2011–2013 | 24 | 5 | 6 | 13 | 20.83 |
| (Russia) Yuri Krasnozhan | 2014–2015 | 17 | 3 | 6 | 8 | 17.65 |
| (Kazakhstan) Talgat Baysufinov | 2016 | 8 | 2 | 3 | 3 | 25.00 |
| (Russia) Aleksandr Borodyuk | 2017 | 7 | 0 | 1 | 6 | 0.00 |
| (Bulgaria) Stanimir Stoilov | 2018 | 9 | 3 | 3 | 3 | 33.33 |
| (Czech Republic) Michal Bílek | 2019–2020 | 18 | 5 | 3 | 10 | 27.78 |
| (Kazakhstan) Talgat Baysufinov | 2021 | 10 | 1 | 3 | 6 | 10.00 |
| (Kazakhstan) Andrei Karpovich | 2022 | 2 | 1 | 0 | 1 | 50.00 |
| (Russia) Magomed Adiyev | 2022–2024 | 20 | 10 | 1 | 9 | 50.00 |
| (Russia) Stanislav Cherchesov | 2024–2025 | 8 | 0 | 1 | 7 | 0.00 |
| (Kazakhstan) Ali Aliyev (caretaker) | 2025 | 8 | 2 | 0 | 6 | 25.00 |
| (Kazakhstan) Talgat Baysufinov | 2025–2026 | 8 | 3 | 3 | 2 | 37.50 |
| (Netherlands) John van 't Schip | 2026 | 6 | 0 | 3 | 3 | 0.00 |

== Players ==
=== Current squad ===
The following players were named in the squad for the 2026–27 UEFA Nations League matches against Moldova on 13 November, and Slovakia on 16 November 2026.

Caps and goals updated as of 16 November 2026, after the match against Slovakia.

| No. | Pos. | Player | Date of birth (age) | Caps | Goals | Club |
|---|---|---|---|---|---|---|
| | GK | Stas Pokatilov | 8 December 1992 (age 33) | 34 | 0 | (Association of Football Federations of Azerbaijan) Sabah |
| | GK | Temirlan Anarbekov | 14 October 2003 (age 23) | 6 | 0 | (Kazakhstan Football Federation) Kairat |
| | GK | Bekkhan Shayzada | 28 February 1998 (age 28) | 5 | 0 | (Kazakhstan Football Federation) Ordabasy |
| | DF | Serhiy Malyi | 5 June 1990 (age 36) | 78 | 3 | (Kazakhstan Football Federation) Ordabasy |
| | DF | Yan Vorogovsky | 7 August 1996 (age 30) | 69 | 7 | (Kazakhstan Football Federation) Astana |
| | DF | Nuraly Alip (captain) | 22 December 1999 (age 26) | 59 | 2 | (Russian Football Union) Zenit Saint Petersburg |
| | DF | Yerkin Tapalov | 3 September 1993 (age 33) | 27 | 0 | (Kazakhstan Football Federation) Kairat |
| | DF | Temirlan Yerlanov | 9 July 1993 (age 33) | 25 | 2 | (Kazakhstan Football Federation) Aktobe |
| | DF | Alibek Kasym | 27 May 1998 (age 28) | 19 | 2 | (Kazakhstan Football Federation) Astana |
| | DF | Nauryzbek Zhagorov | 1 March 1998 (age 28) | 12 | 0 | (Kazakhstan Football Federation) Tobol |
| | DF | Arsen Ashirbek | 22 October 2003 (age 23) | 7 | 0 | (Kazakhstan Football Federation) Yelimay |
| | DF | Aleksandr Mrynskiy | 15 July 2004 (age 22) | 7 | 0 | (Kazakhstan Football Federation) Kairat |
| | DF | Adilbek Zhumakhanov | 27 December 2002 (age 23) | 5 | 0 | (Kazakhstan Football Federation) Yelimay |
| | DF | Alexander Shirobokov | 2 January 2003 (age 23) | 0 | 0 | (Kazakhstan Football Federation) Kairat |
| | MF | Islambek Kuat | 12 January 1993 (age 33) | 77 | 6 | (Kazakhstan Football Federation) Zhenis |
| | MF | Bauyrzhan Islamkhan | 23 February 1993 (age 33) | 60 | 4 | (Kazakhstan Football Federation) Astana |
| | MF | Ramazan Orazov | 30 January 1998 (age 28) | 45 | 2 | (Kazakhstan Football Federation) Yelimay |
| | MF | Georgy Zhukov | 19 November 1994 (age 32) | 29 | 0 | (Kazakhstan Football Federation) Aktobe |
| | MF | Aybol Abiken | 1 June 1996 (age 30) | 20 | 1 | (Kazakhstan Football Federation) Kaisar |
| | MF | Dinmukhamed Karaman | 26 June 2000 (age 26) | 15 | 1 | (Kazakhstan Football Federation) Astana |
| | MF | Zhasulan Amir | 21 December 2006 (age 19) | 6 | 0 | (Kazakhstan Football Federation) Ordabasy |
| | MF | Damir Kasabulat | 29 August 2002 (age 24) | 6 | 0 | (Kazakhstan Football Federation) Kairat |
| | MF | Ismail Bekbolat | 10 January 2008 (age 18) | 4 | 0 | (Kazakhstan Football Federation) Kairat |
| | MF | Azamat Tuyakbaev | 13 July 2007 (age 19) | 2 | 0 | (Kazakhstan Football Federation) Kairat |
| | MF | Almas Tyulyubay | 18 April 2001 (age 25) | 1 | 0 | (Kazakhstan Football Federation) Yelimay |
| | FW | Maksim Samorodov | 29 June 2002 (age 24) | 37 | 6 | (Russian Football Union) Akhmat Grozny |
| | FW | Islam Chesnokov | 21 November 1999 (age 26) | 28 | 4 | (Russian Football Union) Krylia Sovetov |
| | FW | Elkhan Astanov | 21 May 2000 (age 26) | 26 | 1 | (Kazakhstan Football Federation) Ordabasy |
| | FW | Galymzhan Kenzhebek | 12 February 2003 (age 23) | 18 | 3 | (Russian Football Union) Akhmat Grozny |
| | FW | Aybar Zhaksylykov | 24 July 1997 (age 29) | 18 | 0 | (Kazakhstan Football Federation) Yelimay |
| | FW | Artur Shushenachev | 7 April 1998 (age 28) | 13 | 0 | (Kazakhstan Football Federation) Aktobe |
| | FW | Ramazan Karimov | 5 July 1999 (age 27) | 8 | 1 | (Kazakhstan Football Federation) Astana |
| | FW | Stanislav Basmanov | 24 June 2001 (age 25) | 3 | 0 | (Kazakhstan Football Federation) Astana |

=== Recent call-ups ===
The following players have also been called up to the Kazakhstan's squad in the last 12 months.

| Pos. | Player | Date of birth (age) | Caps | Goals | Club | Latest call-up |
|---|---|---|---|---|---|---|
| GK | Aleksandr Zarutskiy | 26 August 1993 (age 33) | 5 | 0 | (Kazakhstan) Aktobe | v.Faroe Islands, 6 October 2026 |
| GK | Mukhammedzhan Seysen | 14 February 1999 (age 27) | 7 | 0 | (Kazakhstan) Astana | v. Comoros, 31 March 2026 |
| DF | Sagi Sovet | 15 March 2000 (age 26) | 1 | 0 | (Kazakhstan) Kaisar | v. Hungary, 9 June 2026 |
| DF | Sanzhar Satanov | 21 September 2001 (age 25) | 0 | 0 | (Kazakhstan) Atyrau | v. Hungary, 9 June 2026 |
| DF | Meyrambek Kalmyrza | 15 December 2002 (age 23) | 1 | 0 | (Kazakhstan) Tobol | v. Comoros, 31 March 2026 |
| DF | Adilet Kenesbek | 5 January 1996 (age 30) | 0 | 0 | (Kazakhstan) Kaisar | v. Comoros, 31 March 2026 |
| MF | Adilet Sadybekov | 26 May 2002 (age 24) | 6 | 1 | (Kazakhstan) Kairat | v. Hungary, 9 June 2026 |
| MF | Damir Marat | 5 November 2000 (age 26) | 2 | 0 | (Kazakhstan) Tobol | v. Comoros, 31 March 2026 |
| FW | Roman Murtazayev | 10 September 1993 (age 33) | 26 | 3 | (Kazakhstan) Yelimay | v. Hungary, 9 June 2026 |
| FW | Dastan Satpayev | 12 August 2008 (age 18) | 9 | 1 | (England) Burnley | v. Hungary, 9 June 2026 |
| FW | Maksat Abrayev | 13 February 2008 (age 18) | 2 | 0 | (Kazakhstan) Astana | v. Hungary, 9 June 2026 |
| FW | Abinur Nurymbet | 26 April 2005 (age 21) | 1 | 0 | (Kazakhstan) Okzhetpes | v. Hungary, 9 June 2026 |
| FW | Magzhan Toktybay | 28 April 2004 (age 22) | 1 | 0 | (Kazakhstan) Ordabasy | v. Hungary, 9 June 2026 |
| FW | Oralkhan Omirtayev | 16 July 1998 (age 28) | 9 | 2 | (Kazakhstan) Okzhetpes | v. Comoros, 31 March 2026 |
| FW | Ivan Sviridov | 28 June 2002 (age 24) | 6 | 0 | (Kazakhstan) Yelimay | v. Comoros, 31 March 2026 |
| FW | Zhaslan Zhumashev | 27 September 2001 (age 25) | 1 | 0 | (Kazakhstan) Tobol | v. Comoros, 31 March 2026 |
| FW | Nurdaulet Agzambaev | 2 June 1999 (age 27) | 0 | 0 | (Kazakhstan) Kaisar | v. Comoros, 31 March 2026 |
^{PRE} Preliminary squad.^{INJ} Injured after call up squad.^{WD} Player was withdrawn from the roster for non-injury related reasons.^{RET} Retired from the national team.

== Player records ==
As of 16 November 2026
Players in bold are still active with Kazakhstan.

=== Most appearances ===
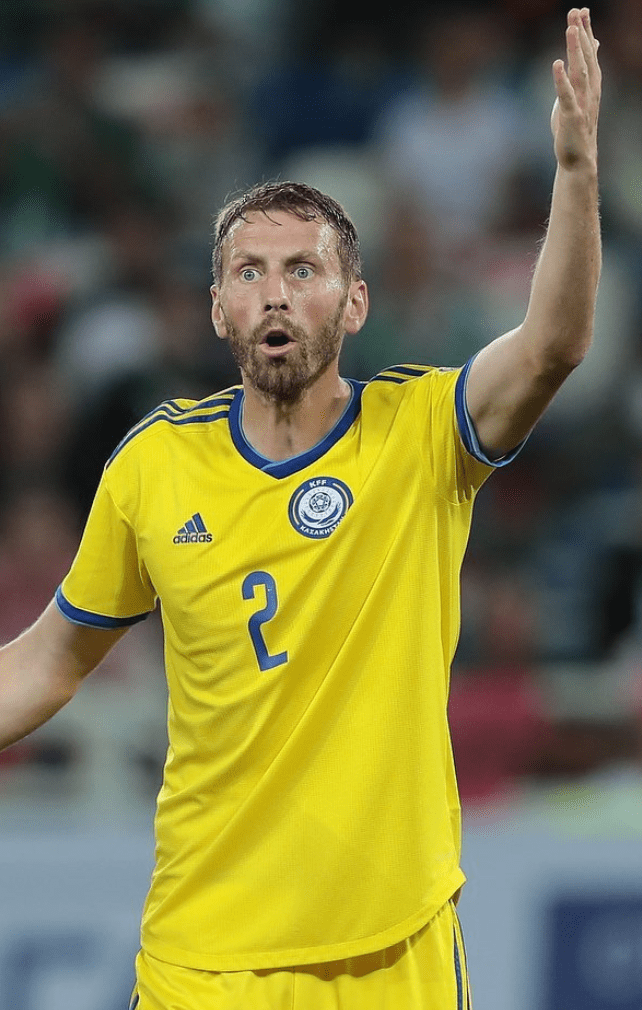
Serhiy Malyi is Kazakhstan's most capped player with 78 appearances.

| Rank | Name | Caps | Goals | Period |
|---|---|---|---|---|
| 1 | **Serhiy Malyi** | 78 | 3 | 2014–present |
| 2 | **Islambek Kuat** | 77 | 6 | 2015–present |
| 3 | Samat Smakov | 76 | 2 | 2000–2016 |
| 4 | Ruslan Baltiev | 73 | 13 | 1997–2009 |
| 5 | **Yan Vorogovskiy** | 69 | 7 | 2017–present |
| 6 | Askhat Tagybergen | 65 | 4 | 2014–2025 |
| 7 | **Bauyrzhan Islamkhan** | 60 | 4 | 2012–present |
| 8 | **Nuraly Alip** | 59 | 2 | 2018–present |
| 9 | Yuriy Logvinenko | 58 | 5 | 2008–2022 |
| 9 | Nurbol Zhumaskaliyev | 58 | 7 | 2001–2014 |

=== Top goalscorers ===
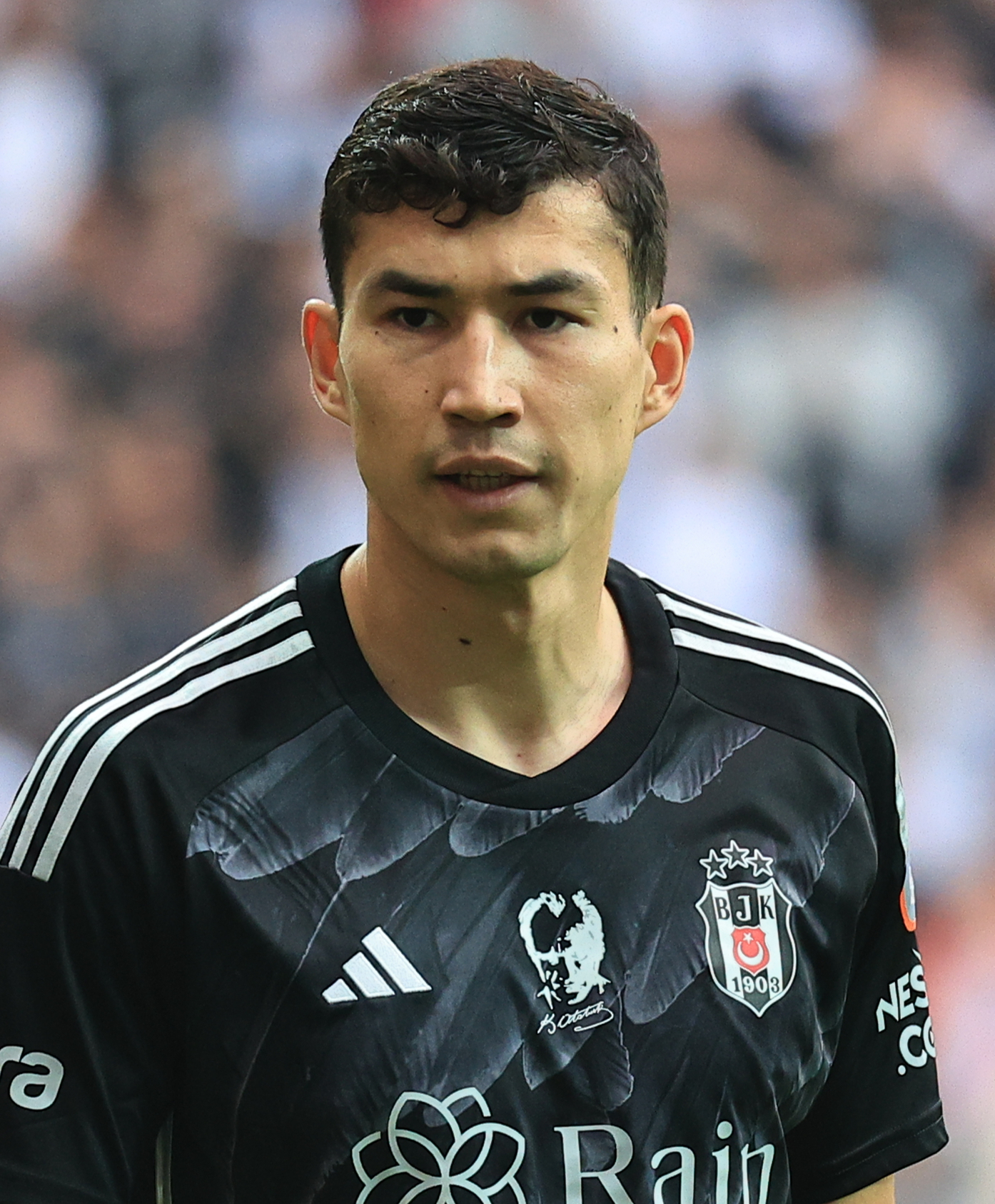
Baktiyar Zaynutdinov is Kazakhstan's top scorer with 15 goals.

| Rank | Name | Goals | Caps | Ratio | Period |
|---|---|---|---|---|---|
| 1 | **Baktiyar Zaynutdinov** | 15 | 44 | 0.34 | 2018–present |
| 2 | Ruslan Baltiev | 13 | 73 | 0.17 | 1997–2009 |
| 3 | Viktor Zubarev | 12 | 18 | 0.67 | 1997–2002 |
| 4 | **Abat Aymbetov** | 9 | 45 | 0.20 | 2019–present |
| 5 | Dmitriy Byakov | 8 | 33 | 0.24 | 2000–2008 |
| 5 | Sergey Khizhnichenko | 8 | 52 | 0.15 | 2009–2020 |
| 5 | Nurbol Zhumaskaliyev | 8 | 58 | 0.14 | 2001–2014 |
| 8 | **Yan Vorogovsky** | 7 | 69 | 0.10 | 2017–present |
| 9 | Igor Avdeyev | 6 | 28 | 0.21 | 1996–2005 |
| 9 | Oleg Litvinenko | 6 | 28 | 0.21 | 1996–2006 |
| 9 | **Maksim Samorodov** | 6 | 37 | 0.16 | 2021–present |
| 9 | Sergei Ostapenko | 6 | 42 | 0.14 | 2007–2014 |
| 9 | **Islambek Kuat** | 6 | 77 | 0.08 | 2015–present |

== Competitive record ==
=== FIFA World Cup ===
| FIFA World Cup record | | | | | | | | | | Qualification record | | | | | | |
| Year | Round | Position | Pld | W | D | L | GF | GA | Squad | Pld | W | D | L | GF | GA | Link |
|---|---|---|---|---|---|---|---|---|---|---|---|---|---|---|---|---|
| (Uruguay) 1930 to (Italy) 1990 | Part of Soviet Union | | | | | | | | | Part of Soviet Union | | | | | | |
| (United States) 1994 | Not a FIFA member | | | | | | | | | Not a FIFA member | | | | | | |
| (France) 1998 | Did not qualify | | | | | | | | | 12 | 5 | 3 | 4 | 22 | 21 | Link |
| (South Korea) (Japan) 2002 | Did not qualify | | | | | | | | | 6 | 4 | 2 | 0 | 20 | 2 | Link |
| (Germany) 2006 | Did not qualify | | | | | | | | | 12 | 0 | 1 | 11 | 6 | 29 | Link |
| (South Africa) 2010 | Did not qualify | | | | | | | | | 10 | 2 | 0 | 8 | 11 | 29 | Link |
| (Brazil) 2014 | Did not qualify | | | | | | | | | 10 | 1 | 2 | 7 | 6 | 21 | Link |
| (Russia) 2018 | Did not qualify | | | | | | | | | 10 | 0 | 3 | 7 | 6 | 26 | Link |
| (Qatar) 2022 | Did not qualify | | | | | | | | | 8 | 0 | 3 | 5 | 5 | 20 | Link |
| (Canada) (Mexico) (United States) 2026 | Did not qualify | | | | | | | | | 8 | 2 | 2 | 4 | 9 | 13 | Link |
| (Morocco) (Portugal) (Spain) 2030 | To be determined | | | | | | | | | To be determined | | | | | | |
| (Saudi Arabia) 2034 | To be determined | | | | | | | | | To be determined | | | | | | |
| Total | | 0/23 | | | | | | | — | 76 | 14 | 16 | 46 | 85 | 161 | Link |

=== UEFA European Championship ===
| UEFA European Championship record | | | | | | | | | Qualification record | | | | | | |
| Year | Result | Position | Pld | W | D | L | GF | GA | Pld | W | D | L | GF | GA | Link |
|---|---|---|---|---|---|---|---|---|---|---|---|---|---|---|---|
| (France) 1960 to (Sweden) 1992 | Part of Soviet Union | | | | | | | | Part of Soviet Union | | | | | | |
| (England) 1996 | Not a UEFA member | | | | | | | | Not a UEFA member | | | | | | |
| (Belgium) (Netherlands) 2000 to (Portugal) 2004 | Candidate member of UEFA (Note: In 2000, the Football Federation of Kazakhstan became a candidate member of UEFA and obtained its full membership a couple of years later.) | | | | | | | | Candidate member of UEFA | | | | | | |
| (Austria) (Switzerland) 2008 | Did not qualify | | | | | | | | 14 | 2 | 4 | 8 | 11 | 21 | Link |
| (Poland) (Ukraine) 2012 | Did not qualify | | | | | | | | 10 | 1 | 1 | 8 | 6 | 24 | Link |
| (France) 2016 | Did not qualify | | | | | | | | 10 | 1 | 2 | 7 | 7 | 18 | Link |
| (Europe) 2020 | Did not qualify | | | | | | | | 10 | 3 | 1 | 6 | 13 | 17 | Link |
| (Germany) 2024 | Did not qualify | | | | | | | | 11 | 6 | 0 | 5 | 16 | 17 | Link |
| (England) (Scotland) (Republic of Ireland) (Wales) 2028 | To be determined | | | | | | | | To be determined | | | | | | Link |
| (Italy) (Turkey) 2032 | To be determined | | | | | | | | To be determined | | | | | | Link |
| Total | | 0/17 | 0 | 0 | 0 | 0 | 0 | 0 | 55 | 13 | 8 | 34 | 53 | 97 | Link |

=== UEFA Nations League ===
UEFA Nations League record
| Season | Division | Group | Round | Pos | Pld | W | D | L | GF | GA | P/R | RK |
|---|---|---|---|---|---|---|---|---|---|---|---|---|
| 2018–19 | D | 1 | Group stage | 2nd | 6 | 1 | 3 | 2 | 8 | 7 | ▲ | 47th |
| 2020–21 | C | 4 | Group stage | 4th | 8 | 2 | 1 | 5 | 7 | 11 | Same position | 45th |
| 2022–23 | C | 3 | Group stage | 1st | 6 | 4 | 1 | 1 | 8 | 6 | ▲ | 36th |
| 2024–25 | B | 3 | Group stage | 4th | 6 | 0 | 1 | 5 | 0 | 15 | ▼ | 31st |
| 2026–27 | C | 3 | Group stage | 4th | 6 | 0 | 3 | 3 | 8 | 11 | Same position | TBD |
| Total | | | | | 32 | 7 | 9 | 16 | 31 | 50 | 31st | |

=== AFC Asian Cup ===
| AFC Asian Cup record | | | | | | | | Qualification record | | | | | | |
| Year | Result | Pld | W | D | L | GF | GA | Pld | W | D | L | GF | GA | Link |
| (Hong Kong) 1956 to (Japan) 1992 | Part of Soviet Union | | | | | | | Part of Soviet Union | | | | | | |
| (United Arab Emirates) 1996 | Did not qualify | | | | | | | 4 | 1 | 0 | 3 | 1 | 6 | Link |
| (Lebanon) 2000 | Did not qualify | | | | | | | 4 | 3 | 0 | 1 | 8 | 3 | Link |
| (China) 2004 to present | Not an AFC member | | | | | | | Not an AFC member | | | | | | |
| Total | — | — | — | — | — | — | — | 8 | 4 | 0 | 4 | 9 | 9 | Link |

=== Asian Games ===
Asian Games record
| Year | Result | Pld | W | D | L | GF | GA |
|---|---|---|---|---|---|---|---|
| (India) 1951 to (China) 1990 | Part of Soviet Union | | | | | | |
| (Japan) 1994 | Did not enter | | | | | | |
| (Thailand) 1998 | 10th place | 5 | 2 | 1 | 2 | 8 | 6 |
| (South Korea) 2002 to present | See national under-23 team | | | | | | |
| Total | 1/13 | 5 | 2 | 1 | 2 | 8 | 6 |

=== WAFF Championship ===
WAFF Championship record
| Year | Result | Pld | W | D | L | GF | GA |
|---|---|---|---|---|---|---|---|
| (Jordan) 2000 | Group stage | 3 | 1 | 0 | 2 | 3 | 9 |
| (Syria) 2002 to present | Not a WAFF member | | | | | | |
| Total | 1/1 | 3 | 1 | 0 | 2 | 3 | 9 |

== Record versus other countries ==
As of match played 6 October 2026 against Faroe Islands.

| National team | Played | Won | Drawn | Lost | GF | GA | GD | % Won | Confederation |
|---|---|---|---|---|---|---|---|---|---|
| Albania | 4 | 0 | 1 | 3 | 2 | 6 | −4 | 0.00 | UEFA |
| Andorra | 4 | 3 | 1 | 0 | 11 | 2 | +9 | 75.00 | UEFA |
| Armenia | 9 | 1 | 3 | 5 | 8 | 15 | −7 | 11.11 | UEFA |
| Austria | 6 | 0 | 2 | 4 | 0 | 12 | −12 | 0.00 | UEFA |
| Azerbaijan | 12 | 5 | 3 | 4 | 17 | 15 | +2 | 41.67 | UEFA |
| Bahrain | 1 | 1 | 0 | 0 | 1 | 0 | +1 | 100.00 | AFC |
| Belarus | 8 | 1 | 2 | 5 | 7 | 20 | −13 | 12.50 | UEFA |
| Belgium | 8 | 0 | 3 | 5 | 4 | 20 | −16 | 0.00 | UEFA |
| Bosnia and Herzegovina | 2 | 0 | 1 | 1 | 2 | 4 | −2 | 0.00 | UEFA |
| Bulgaria | 2 | 0 | 0 | 2 | 2 | 4 | −2 | 0.00 | UEFA |
| Burkina Faso | 1 | 0 | 1 | 0 | 0 | 0 | +0 | 0.00 | CAF |
| China | 3 | 1 | 0 | 2 | 2 | 5 | −3 | 33.33 | AFC |
| Comoros | 1 | 1 | 0 | 0 | 1 | 0 | +1 | 100.00 | CAF |
| Croatia | 2 | 0 | 0 | 2 | 1 | 5 | −4 | 0.00 | UEFA |
| Curaçao | 1 | 1 | 0 | 0 | 2 | 0 | +2 | 100.00 | CONCACAF |
| Cyprus | 4 | 0 | 1 | 3 | 4 | 8 | −4 | 0.00 | UEFA |
| Czech Republic | 2 | 0 | 0 | 2 | 3 | 6 | −3 | 0.00 | UEFA |
| Denmark | 6 | 1 | 0 | 5 | 7 | 17 | −10 | 16.67 | UEFA |
| England | 2 | 0 | 0 | 2 | 1 | 9 | −8 | 0.00 | UEFA |
| Estonia | 3 | 1 | 2 | 0 | 3 | 1 | +2 | 33.33 | UEFA |
| Faroe Islands | 7 | 1 | 3 | 3 | 9 | 11 | −2 | 14.29 | UEFA |
| Finland | 7 | 1 | 1 | 5 | 3 | 9 | −6 | 14.29 | UEFA |
| France | 2 | 0 | 0 | 2 | 0 | 10 | −10 | 0.00 | UEFA |
| Georgia | 6 | 1 | 2 | 3 | 4 | 7 | −3 | 16.67 | UEFA |
| Germany | 4 | 0 | 0 | 4 | 1 | 14 | −13 | 0.00 | UEFA |
| Greece | 4 | 0 | 0 | 4 | 2 | 12 | −10 | 0.00 | UEFA |
| Hungary | 3 | 1 | 0 | 2 | 1 | 8 | −7 | 33.33 | UEFA |
| Iceland | 2 | 0 | 1 | 1 | 0 | 3 | −3 | 0.00 | UEFA |
| Iran | 2 | 0 | 0 | 2 | 0 | 5 | −5 | 0.00 | AFC |
| Iraq | 4 | 2 | 2 | 0 | 7 | 4 | +3 | 50.00 | AFC |
| (Republic of Ireland) Ireland | 2 | 0 | 0 | 2 | 2 | 5 | −3 | 0.00 | UEFA |
| Japan | 3 | 0 | 1 | 2 | 2 | 10 | −8 | 0.00 | AFC |
| Jordan | 2 | 1 | 0 | 1 | 1 | 2 | −1 | 50.00 | AFC |
| Kuwait | 1 | 0 | 1 | 0 | 0 | 0 | +0 | 0.00 | AFC |
| Kyrgyzstan | 8 | 5 | 2 | 1 | 18 | 6 | +12 | 62.50 | AFC |
| Laos | 1 | 1 | 0 | 0 | 5 | 0 | +5 | 100.00 | AFC |
| Latvia | 7 | 1 | 4 | 2 | 5 | 7 | −2 | 14.29 | UEFA |
| Lebanon | 2 | 0 | 0 | 2 | 1 | 5 | −4 | 0.00 | AFC |
| Libya | 1 | 1 | 0 | 0 | 1 | 0 | +1 | 100.00 | CAF |
| Liechtenstein | 2 | 2 | 0 | 0 | 6 | 0 | +6 | 100.00 | UEFA |
| Lithuania | 3 | 1 | 1 | 1 | 4 | 3 | +1 | 33.33 | UEFA |
| Luxembourg | 1 | 0 | 0 | 1 | 1 | 2 | −1 | 0.00 | UEFA |
| Macau | 2 | 2 | 0 | 0 | 8 | 0 | +8 | 100.00 | AFC |
| Malta | 1 | 0 | 1 | 0 | 2 | 2 | +0 | 0.00 | UEFA |
| Moldova | 8 | 3 | 1 | 4 | 8 | 8 | +0 | 37.50 | UEFA |
| Montenegro | 4 | 0 | 1 | 3 | 0 | 11 | −11 | 0.00 | UEFA |
| Namibia | 1 | 1 | 0 | 0 | 2 | 0 | +2 | 100.00 | CAF |
| Nepal | 2 | 2 | 0 | 0 | 10 | 0 | +10 | 100.00 | AFC |
| Netherlands | 2 | 0 | 0 | 2 | 2 | 5 | −3 | 0.00 | UEFA |
| North Korea | 2 | 0 | 1 | 1 | 0 | 2 | −2 | 0.00 | AFC |
| North Macedonia | 3 | 0 | 1 | 2 | 1 | 6 | −5 | 0.00 | UEFA |
| Northern Ireland | 2 | 2 | 0 | 0 | 2 | 0 | +2 | 100.00 | UEFA |
| Norway | 2 | 0 | 1 | 1 | 0 | 5 | −5 | 0.00 | UEFA |
| Oman | 1 | 1 | 0 | 0 | 3 | 1 | +2 | 100.00 | AFC |
| Pakistan | 3 | 3 | 0 | 0 | 14 | 0 | +14 | 100.00 | AFC |
| Palestine | 2 | 2 | 0 | 0 | 5 | 2 | +3 | 100.00 | AFC |
| Poland | 5 | 0 | 1 | 4 | 3 | 12 | −9 | 0.00 | UEFA |
| Portugal | 3 | 0 | 0 | 3 | 1 | 6 | −5 | 0.00 | UEFA |
| Qatar | 4 | 2 | 0 | 2 | 4 | 6 | −2 | 50.00 | AFC |
| Romania | 2 | 0 | 1 | 1 | 1 | 3 | −2 | 0.00 | UEFA |
| Russia | 4 | 0 | 1 | 3 | 0 | 11 | −11 | 0.00 | UEFA |
| San Marino | 4 | 4 | 0 | 0 | 13 | 2 | +11 | 100.00 | UEFA |
| Saudi Arabia | 2 | 0 | 0 | 2 | 0 | 4 | −4 | 0.00 | AFC |
| Scotland | 2 | 1 | 0 | 1 | 4 | 3 | +1 | 50.00 | UEFA |
| Serbia | 2 | 1 | 0 | 1 | 2 | 2 | +0 | 50.00 | UEFA |
| Singapore | 1 | 0 | 1 | 0 | 0 | 0 | +0 | 0.00 | AFC |
| Slovakia | 3 | 2 | 0 | 1 | 4 | 3 | +1 | 66.67 | UEFA |
| Slovenia | 4 | 0 | 0 | 4 | 2 | 8 | −6 | 0.00 | UEFA |
| South Korea | 2 | 0 | 1 | 1 | 1 | 4 | −3 | 0.00 | AFC |
| Sweden | 2 | 0 | 0 | 2 | 0 | 3 | −3 | 0.00 | UEFA |
| Syria | 4 | 0 | 1 | 3 | 1 | 8 | −7 | 0.00 | AFC |
| Tajikistan | 5 | 4 | 1 | 0 | 9 | 3 | +6 | 80.00 | AFC |
| Thailand | 2 | 0 | 2 | 0 | 3 | 3 | +0 | 0.00 | AFC |
| Turkey | 6 | 0 | 0 | 6 | 2 | 19 | −17 | 0.00 | UEFA |
| Turkmenistan | 3 | 1 | 2 | 0 | 2 | 1 | +1 | 33.33 | AFC |
| Ukraine | 6 | 0 | 2 | 4 | 6 | 12 | −6 | 0.00 | UEFA |
| United Arab Emirates | 4 | 1 | 0 | 3 | 6 | 11 | −5 | 25.00 | AFC |
| Uzbekistan | 7 | 1 | 3 | 3 | 4 | 10 | −6 | 14.29 | AFC |
| Vietnam | 1 | 0 | 0 | 1 | 1 | 2 | −1 | 0.00 | AFC |
| Wales | 2 | 0 | 0 | 2 | 1 | 4 | −3 | 0.00 | UEFA |
| Total | 269 | 68 | 60 | 141 | 282 | 450 | −168 | 25.28 | 4/6 |

== See also ==
- Football in Kazakhstan
