= Vakhid Masudov =

Kazakh football coach (born 1959)

Personal information
- Full name: Vakhid Yunusovich Masudov
- Date of birth: 10 October 1959 (age 67)
- Place of birth: Dzhambul, Kazakh SSR, Soviet Union
- Height: 1.77 m (5 ft 10 in)
- Position: Midfielder

Team information
- Current team: Aksu (manager)

Senior career*
Years	Team	Apps	(Gls)
1977–1978	Khimik Dzhambul		
1978	Xorazm		
1979	Meliorator Kzyl-Orda		
1980–1989	Kairat Alma-Ata	242	(25)
1990	Terek Grozny	33	(13)
1991–1992	Kairat Almaty	52	(4)
1993	Dostyk Almaty	24	(5)
1993–1994	Preußen Hameln	22	(1)
1994	SC Göttingen 05		
1994	Aktyubinets	15	(2)
1995	Yelimay Semipalatinsk	27	(5)
1996–1997	Kairat Almaty	31	(6)

International career
1992–1996	Kazakhstan	10	(0)

Managerial career
- 1990: Terek Grozny (assistant)
- 1991–1992: Kairat (player-manager)
- 1993: Dostyk (player-manager)
- 1994: Aktyubinets (player-manager)
- 1995: Yelimay Semipalatinsk (player-manager)
- 1996–1997: Kairat (player-manager)
- 1998: Kairat-CSKA
- 1999: Taraz
- 2000: Shakhter Karagandy
- 2001: Kairat
- 2001–2002: Kazakhstan
- 2002: Vostok-Altyn
- 2003: Aktobe-Lento
- 2004: Zhetysu
- 2005: Shakhter Karagandy
- 2007–2008: Kairat
- 2009: Lokomotiv Astana
- 2009–2010: Atyrau
- 2010–2011: Vostok
- 2012–2013: Kairat (assistant)
- 2013: Ordabasy
- 2014: Astana-1964
- 2015: CSKA Almaty
- 2016: Kazakhstan U21
- 2016–2017: Akzhayik
- 2018: Atyrau
- 2018–2019: Taraz
- 2021: Maktaaral
- 2021: Aktobe
- 2022–2023: Shakhter Karagandy
- 2023–: Aksu
- * Club domestic league appearances and goals

Vakhid Yunusovich Masudov (Russian: Вахид Юнусович Масудов; born 10 October 1959) is a Kazakh football coach and former midfielder who is the head coach of Aksu. He played for the Kazakhstan national football team. Born in modern-day Taraz, Masudov is named Master of Sports of the Soviet Union (1986) and has the coaching category "A".

== Career ==
In the spring of 1977, Masudov made his debut in the Dzhambul "Khimik" (now FC Taraz) masters team.

A year later, he moved to the Xorazm FK Urganch team from Xonqa, where he was recommended by ex-Khimik player Christopher Kaskinidi. Returning to Dzhambul, in the fall of 1978, he received a summons to the military registration and enlistment office and went to serve in a team from Kyzylorda, the "Orbita" (now FC Kaisar).

In 1980, FC Kairat mentor Igor Volchok called him to himself, and later went on to create a team in Alma-Ata. On 7 April 1980, Masudov made his debut for Kairat in the top league of the Soviet Championship against Dinamo Tbilisi. In the second round of the 1980 season, he became a solid base player. He was the captain and leader of the team.

In 1990, he spent one season for the "Terek" FC (now FC Akhmat Grozny). In 1991, he returned to "Kairat", for which he played for another 2 seasons.

On 1 June 1992, he made his debut for the Kazakhstan national football team in its home game against the Turkmenistan national football team for the Central Asian Cup. In total, he played in 10 matches for the national team, and was the captain of the national team.

In 1993, Masudov played for the "FC Dostyk", from where in the autumn of 1993, he left to play in Germany in the Oberliga Club "Preussen 07 Hameln". He also played for the German club Göttingen 05.

After returning from Germany, he became a playing coach at the FC Aktobenets (now FC Aktobe). In 1995, he played for FC Yelimay.

== Manager ==
Since 1996, Masudov coaches football.

He headed "Kairat", at the same time he entered the field. At the end of the 1999 season, he left the team.

From August 1999 to May 2000, he headed FC Taraz.

From July to December 2000, he coached the Karaganda FC Shakhtyor-Ispat-Karmet (now FC Shakhter Karagandy).

In 2001 he returned to Kairat, where he stayed only until August.

From 2001 to 2002, he coached the Kazakhstan national football team.

In 2002, he headed the FC "Vostok-Altyn" (now FC Vostok) team.

From June to July 2003, he was the coach of the FC Aktobe (then "Aktobe-Lento").

In 2004, he worked with the FC Zhetysu.

From 2005 to 2006, he headed FC Shakhter Karagandy.

From 2007 to 2008, he headed Kairat once again.

In 2009, he was the coach of FC Lokomotiv (now FC Astana). In February, after several months of working with the team, a week before the start of the championship of Kazakhstan, he wrote a letter of resignation of his own free will.

In March 2009, he headed the FC Atyrau. Soon, together with the team, he became the owner of the 2009 Kazakhstan Cup. In March 2010, before the game with Aktobe for the Kazakhstan Super Cup, he was fired from the team.

In 2010, he led the FC Vostok League 1st League team and brought it to the Premier League. In May 2011, after 10 rounds, he left the team for familial reasons, specifically his wife's illness.

In August 2012, he joined the coaching staff of the Almaty FC Kairat.

From 2013 to 2015, he coached the FC Ordabasy, Astana-1964 (now FC Zhenis), and FC CSKA Almaty clubs for a season.

Since February 2016, he became the head coach of the youth team of Kazakhstan.

From 2016 to 2017, he was the head coach of the FC Akzhayik.

In January 2018, Masudov was appointed head coach of the FC Atyrau, but after four starting defeats, he was dismissed in April.

In 2019, he is the chief coach of the FC Taraz. He left the position the same year. From January to June 2021, he was the coach of FC Maktaaral.

From June to July 2021, Masudov headed FC Aktobe.

Since January 2022, he is the coach of "Kazakhstan U19".

From June 2022 to January 2023, Masudov is the head coach of FC Shakhter Karagandy.
