= FC Bayterek =

Kazakhstani football club

- Full name: Football Club Bayterek; Бәйтерек Футбол Клубы
- Founded: 2012
- Ground: Astana Arena
- Capacity: 30,000
- Manager: Oirat Saduov
- League: Kazakhstan First Division
- 2014: 10th
Home colours

FC Bayterek (Kazakh: Бәйтерек Футбол Клубы, romanized: Bäiterek Futbol Kluby) is a Kazakh football club based at the Astana Arena in Astana. The club is a state sports project, dedicated to play Kazakh graduates of Brazilian football academy Olé Brasil Futebol Clube. In its first season in 2012 Bayterek had mix of graduates born 1994 and experienced professionals. However, in future it is planned to have purely graduates of the academy.

== History ==
In 2009, 26 young players (born in 1994) were selected by Football Federation of Kazakhstan for training at international football academy Olé Brasil Futebol Clube. After graduation in March 2012, Agency of Sports & Physical Culture of RoK decided to create a new football team named FC Bayterek to participate in First Division and further development of the graduates. Due to young age of players (17–18 years) and possible difficulty playing against older opponents, the club included several experienced professionals. A total of 27 players, 15 of which graduated of the Brazilian academy, were chosen as the final roster. In March 2012 a second group of players (born 1997) was sent to the academy. The third group of trainees (born 2000) were sent to Cruzeiro academy in March 2015.

=== Domestic history ===
Season	Level	Pos	Pld	W	D	L	For	Against	Points	Domestic Cup	Top goalscorer
2012	2nd	4	30	14	11	5	39	19	53	First round	
2013	2nd	15	34	8	5	21	32	67	23	First round	
2014	2nd	10	28	10	2	16	34	52	32	First round	
2015	2nd	12	24	2	4	18	13	52	10	Preliminary Round	

== Kazakh graduates of Olé Brasil C.F. (born 1994) ==
Period of study (March 2009 – March 2012). Updated as of start of 2015 season.

#	Name	DOB	Place of birth	Pos.	Current club	Notes
1	Rafkhat Aslan	2 February 1994 (age 32)	Almaty Region	DF	Tobol	Capped at U19 level
2	Timur Bakhriden	23 February 1994 (age 32)	Pavlodar Region	FW	Okzhetpes	Capped at U17 level
3	Murager Berikkaziev	15 January 1994 (age 32)	East Kazakhstan Region	MF	Spartak Semey	
4	Baglan Boribay	18 May 1994 (age 32)	South Kazakhstan Region	MF	Kyran	
5	Abylaikhan Duisen	3 June 1994 (age 32)	South Kazakhstan Region	GK	Bayterek	
6	Farkhad Dzhanibekov	6 February 1994 (age 32)	Astana	MF		Capped at U17 level
7	Olzhas Ilyasov	9 September 1994 (age 32)	Kostanay Region	MF	Bolat	Capped at U19 level
8	Murat Kalambekov	23 February 1994 (age 32)	Aktobe Region	DF	Zhetysu	Capped at U19 level
9	Mukhtar Kalymbetov	22 February 1994 (age 32)	South Kazakhstan Region	DF	Bayterek	Capped at U17 level
10	Serikbolsyn Kenenov	27 June 1994 (age 32)	Almaty	DF	Tobol	
11	Almas Kurmanali	27 June 1994 (age 32)	Almaty Region	GK		Capped at U17 level
12	Aibek Mirabzalov	5 January 1994 (age 32)	Jambyl Region	FW		
13	Kuat Myrza	5 January 1994 (age 32)	South Kazakhstan Region	DF	Ordabasy	
14	Viktor Pavlenok	10 May 1994 (age 32)	Pavlodar Region	MF	Ekibastuz	
15	Magomed Paragulkov	23 February 1994 (age 32)	Almaty	MF	Spartak Semey	Capped at U17 level
16	Aleksei Rodionov	29 March 1994 (age 32)	Atyrau Region	FW	Astana	Capped at U19 level
17	Shyngys Saparbekuly	19 November 1994 (age 31)	Jambyl Region	MF		
18	Rauan Sariyev	22 January 1994 (age 32)	Almaty Region	FW	Ordabasy	Capped at U17 level
19	Abdumalik Sarsekbaev	11 March 1994 (age 32)	?	MF	Lashyn	
20	Aset Seksenbaev	29 January 1994 (age 32)	Almaty	DF	Zhetysu	
21	Azamat Serikuly	1 January 1994 (age 32)	Jambyl Region	MF		
22	Berik Shaikhov	20 February 1994 (age 32)	Almaty Region	FW	Irtysh	Capped at U17, U19, U21 levels
23	Aslan Suleimenov	25 January 1994 (age 32)	Pavlodar Region	DF	Bayterek	Capped at U19 level
24	Almat Tleukabylov	23 November 1994 (age 31)	Kyzylorda Region	MF	Baikonur	
25	Miras Tuleyev	30 August 1994 (age 32)	Mangystau Region	MF	Okzhetpes	Capped at U21 level
26	Yevgeniy Yalfimov	6 February 1994 (age 32)	Aktobe Region	FW		

== Kazakh graduates of Olé Brasil C.F. (born 1997) ==
Period of study (March 2012 – March 2015). Updated as of start of 2015 season.

#	Name	DOB	Place of birth	Pos	Current club	Notes
1	Magzhan Abdesh	1 January 1997 (age 29)	Shymkent	DF	Bayterek	
2	Rustem Abdrazakov	23 June 1997 (age 29)	Taldykorgan	DF	Bayterek	
3	Shyngyskhan Akhlasov	23 October 1997 (age 28)	Taldykorgan	GK	Bayterek	
4	Ruslan Alimbaev	2 March 1997 (age 29)	Karagandy	DF	Shakhter	
5	Alibek Batyrbekov		Taldykorgan	DF		
6	Daniar Dauletbayev	31 January 1997 (age 29)	Taraz	FW	Bayterek	
7	Meirzhan Kambil	1 March 1997 (age 29)	Shymkent	DF	Bayterek	
8	Aidar Khusnadinov	30 April 1997 (age 29)	Aktau	MF	Bayterek	
9	Sergei Komarov	16 January 1997 (age 29)	Karagandy	DF	Shakhter	
10	Ernazar Kumar			FW		
11	Aibolat Makuov	16 February 1997 (age 29)	Atyrau	FW	Atyrau	
12	Farukh Mirsalimbaev	20 January 1997 (age 29)	Taraz	MF	Bayterek	
13	Kuanysh Mukhanbet		Shymkent	MF		
14	Olzhas Mukhanov	27 October 1997 (age 28)	Aktau	GK	Bayterek	
15	Edige Oralbai	11 March 1997 (age 29)	Shymkent	FW	Bayterek	
16	Abilmansur Reshetov	14 July 1997 (age 29)	Atyrau	MF	Atyrau	
17	Askhat Sadirov		Taraz	MF		
18	Abai Saifullin		Taraz	MF		
19	Aisabek Sarsengaliev	13 June 1997 (age 29)	Aktau	MF	Bayterek	
20	Aisultan Seidakhmet	11 July 1997 (age 29)	Taldykorgan	DF	Zhetysu	
21	Zhasulan Shubaev	2 February 1997 (age 29)	Kostanay	MF	Tobol	
22	Demiyat Slambekov	13 January 1997 (age 29)	Almaty	MF	Bayterek	
23	Maksat Taikenov	14 August 1997 (age 29)	Aktau	MF	Bayterek	
24	Bekzhan Toktarbai		Shymkent	GK		
25	Bolat Tynybek	26 January 1997 (age 29)	Shymkent	DF	Bayterek	
26	Vladislav Vasiliev	10 April 1997 (age 29)	Karagandy	MF	Shakhter	

== Kazakh trainees of Cruzeiro E.C. (born 2000) ==
Period of study (March 2015 – March 2018).,

#	Name	DOB	Place of birth	Pos.	Region	Notes
1	Alikhan Imanov				Aktobe	
2	Yernar Saulauov				Karagandy	
3	Merei Mauezov				Shymkent	
4	Abzal Orazbayev				Taraz	
5	Bekzat Bektai				Kyzylorda	
6	Yeskhat Tagybergen				Aktobe	
7	Bakytzhan Telepbergen				Shymkent	
8	Adil Baigazin				Kostanay	
9	Dmitriy Bachek				Karagandy	
10	Rustam Emirov				Almaty Region	
11	Ravil Ibragimov				Almaty Region	
12	Ilya Podbolotov				Almaty Region	
13	Miras Abdibekov				Taraz	
14	Dinmukhamet Karaman				Taraz	
15	Dinmukhamet Omarov				Shymkent	
16	Aldiyar Alim				Almaty	
17	Kanat Djupkaziyev				Almaty	
18	Olzhas Amangeldiyev				Astana	
19	Nurbol Nurbergen				Taldykorgan	
20	Daniyar Yermekbayev				Almaty	
21	Tair Nurseitov				Karagandy	
22	Asset Ramazanov				Taldykorgan	
23	Damir Zhanbayev				Oral	
24	Asylzhan Yesenov				Kokshetau	
25	Nursultan Albekov				Almaty	
26	Daryn Kainola				Taldykorgan	
