= 2018 Kazakhstan Cup =

Tournament details
- Country: Kazakhstan
- Teams: 25

Tournament statistics
- Matches played: 27
- Goals scored: 94 (3.48 per match)

The 2018 Kazakhstan Cup is the 27th season of the Kazakhstan Cup, the annual nationwide football cup competition of Kazakhstan since the independence of the country.

== Participating clubs ==
The following 21 teams qualified for the competition:

Premier League all clubs of season 2018	First Division; Seven clubs of season 2018	Second Division; Six clubs of season 2018
Aktobe; Akzhayik; Astana; Atyrau; Irtysh Pavlodar; Kairat; Kaisar; Kyzylzhar; Ordabasy; Shakhter Karagandy; Tobol; Zhetysu	Altai Semey; Caspiy; Ekibastuz; Kyran; Makhtaaral; Okzhetpes; Taraz	Ak-Bet; Akademiya Ontustik; CSKA Almaty; Osdyussor Zhas Ulan; Ruzaevka; SDYuShOR 8

== Group stages ==
=== Group A ===
Pos	Team	Pld	W	D	L	GF	GA	GD	Pts	Qualification
1	Okzhetpes	2	1	1	0	8	1	+7	4	Advanced to Last 16
2	Akademiya Ontustik	2	1	1	0	7	2	+5	4	
3	Osdyussor Zhas Ulan	2	0	0	2	1	13	−12	0	

Updated to match(es) played on 24 March 2017. Source: PFLK

18 March 2018	Okzhetpes	1 – 1	Akademiya Ontustik	Kokshetau
15:00 (UTC+6)	Nurlan Dairov (yellow card) 20'; Sanat Zhumakhanov 59'	Report	Shyngys Samenov 90+5'	Stadium: Okzhetpes Stadium; Attendance: 200; Referee: Askar Bukenov

21 March 2018	Akademiya Ontustik	6 – 1	Osdyussor Zhas Ulan	Shymkent
15:00 (UTC+6)	Askhat Ermekuulu (yellow card) 16'; Kenzhebek Zhasulan 21' (o.g.); Aliyar Muhamed 57', 69'; Argen Manekeev (yellow card) 65' (goal) 89'; Farukh Mirsalimbayev 66'; Nurzhan Uais 90+2'	Report	Gafurzhan Nazarov (yellow card) 15' (yellow-red card) 33'; Nursultan Zhaksylyk 30'; Vadim Afanasenko (yellow card) 75'	Stadium: Namys Stadion; Attendance: 250; Referee: Arman İsmuratov

24 March 2018	Osdyussor Zhas Ulan	0 – 7	Okzhetpes	Aksukent
16:00 (UTC+6)	Nursultan Zhaksylyk (yellow card) 30' (yellow-red card) 37'; Azamat Karazhan (yellow card) 42'; Abylaykhan Serikbay (yellow card) 73'	Report	Sanat Zhumakhanov 23'; Nurlan Dairov 24', 34', 74', 81'; Viktor Kryukov 28'; Anton Kuksin (yellow card) 42' (goal) 57'	Stadium: Ulan Stadion; Attendance: 100; Referee: Sanjar Iskakov

=== Group B ===
Pos	Team	Pld	W	D	L	GF	GA	GD	Pts	Qualification
1	Makhtaaral	2	1	1	0	8	2	+6	4	Advanced to Last 16
2	CSKA Almaty	2	0	2	0	3	3	0	2	
3	FC Ruzaevka	2	0	1	1	3	9	−6	1	

Updated to match(es) played on 25 March 2017. Source: PFLK

19 March 2018	Makhtaaral	1 – 1	CSKA Almaty	Astana
15:00 (UTC+6)	Kuanysh Begalin 59'; Tolegenov Abylaykhan (yellow card) 63'	Report	Konstantin Kavakidi (yellow card) 62'; Kasymzhan Taipov 64'; Samit Chulagov (yellow card) 87'; Muhammadumbet Baltabay (yellow card) 81'	Stadium: Kazhymukan Munaitpasov Stadium; Attendance: 300; Referee: Saken Bayymbet

22 March 2018	CSKA Almaty	2 – 2	FC Ruzaevka	Shymkent
15:00 (UTC+6)	Samit Chulagov 27' (pen.) (yellow card) 75'; Dauren Suyunov 55'	Report	Maxim Fomenko (yellow card) 9'; Aleksei Smirnov (yellow card) 26'; Daniyar Nukebai 78', 79'	Stadium: Central Stadium; Attendance: 100

25 March 2018	FC Ruzaevka	1 – 7	Makhtaaral	Astana
15:00 (UTC+6)	Stanislav Mosunov (yellow card) 45+1'; Ravil Saurambaev 61' (pen.); Maxim Fomenko (yellow card) 89'	Report	Yelmar Nabiev 2', 15', 28'; Roman Pavinic 24'; Kuanysh Begalin 45+2'; Oleg Pasechenko 72'; Askar Abutov 83'	Stadium: Kazhymukan Munaitpasov Stadium; Attendance: 1,200; Referee: Elvira Nurmustafina

=== Group C ===
Pos	Team	Pld	W	D	L	GF	GA	GD	Pts	Qualification
1	Kyran	2	1	1	0	5	4	+1	4	Advanced to Last 16
2	SDYuShOR 8	2	1	0	1	4	2	+2	3	
3	Caspiy	2	0	1	1	3	6	−3	1	

Updated to match(es) played on 25 March 2017. Source: PFLK

19 March 2018	Kyran	3 – 3	Caspiy	Shymkent
15:00 (UTC+6)	Magamed Uzdenov 11' (o.g.); Zholdasov Nursayin (yellow card) 27'; Kanat Asylbek (yellow card) 41'; Donis Ismailov (yellow card) 49' (goal) 59'; Adil Pazylkhan (yellow card) 80'; Maxim Filcakov 86'	Report	Azat Zhumkenov (yellow card) 14'; Erlan Kadyrbayev (yellow card) 39'; Magamed Uzdenov 66', 89'; Lawrence Elemesov 86'	Stadium: Lokomotive Stadium; Attendance: 300; Referee: Rustam Umarov

22 March 2018	Caspiy	0 – 3	SDYuShOR 8	Shymkent
17:00 (UTC+6)		Report	35'; 49'; 52'	Stadium: FC Biik Stadium

25 March 2018	SDYuShOR 8	1 – 2	Kyran	Shymkent
14:00 (UTC+6)	10'	Report	26'; 70'	Stadium: FC Biik Stadium; Referee: Askhat Abdanbayev

=== Group D ===
Pos	Team	Pld	W	D	L	GF	GA	GD	Pts	Qualification
1	Taraz	3	3	0	0	4	1	+3	9	Advanced to Last 16
2	Altai Semey	3	2	0	1	11	3	+8	6	
3	Ekibastuz	3	1	0	2	5	8	−3	3	
4	Ak-Bet	3	0	0	3	1	9	−8	0	

Updated to match(es) played on 26 March 2017. Source: PFLK

20 March 2018	Ekibastuz	1 – 6	Altai Semey	Shymkent
14:00 (UTC+6)	Akmal Aymenov (yellow card) 11'; Aslan Suleimenov (yellow card) 47'; Geysar Alakbarzadeh (yellow card) 58'; Madiyar Raimbek 75'	Report	Konstantin Zarechniy 4', 77'; Alexei Shakir (yellow card) 24' (goal) 31'; Zhandos Soltan 28' (yellow card) 44'; Vladimir Vyatkin (yellow card) 34'; Anuar Umashev (yellow card) 56'; Dauren Kaikibasov 60'; Oleg Ovchinnikov 72'	Stadium: FC Biik Stadium; Attendance: 200; Referee: Sergei Gorokhovodetsky

20 March 2018	Taraz	1 – 0	Ak-Bet	Shymkent
17:00 (UTC+6)	Bauyrzhan Baitana (yellow card) 49'; Timur Baizhanov (yellow card) 57'; Duman Tursunbay 79'; Sheikhislam Kulakhmets (yellow card) 90+1'	Report		Stadium: FC Biik Stadium; Attendance: 150; Referee: Zhandos Abzhan

23 March 2018	Altai Semey	4 – 0	Ak-Bet	Shymkent
14:00 (UTC+6)	Altynbek Tuleyev 23'; Nursultan Alibekova 30' (o.g.); Aleksei Shakir 68'; Dauren Kaykibasov 73'	Report	Nursultan Alibekova (yellow card) 13'; Chernyshov (yellow card) 76'	Stadium: FC Biik Stadium; Attendance: 50; Referee: Dmitry Bystrovka

23 March 2018	Taraz	1 – 0	Ekibastuz	Shymkent
17:00 (UTC+6)	Duman Tursynbai (yellow card) 28'; Vorotnikov 58'; Govedarica (yellow card) 76'	Report	Aslan Suleymenov (yellow card) 74'; Olzhas Ilyasov (yellow card) 90+1'	Stadium: FC Biik Stadium; Attendance: 100; Referee: Ruslan Sultangaliev

26 March 2018	Altai Semey	1 – 2	Taraz	Shymkent
14:00 (UTC+6)	Soltan Zhandos 1'; Irismetov (yellow card) 14' (yellow-red card) 76'; Vladimir Vyatkin (yellow card) 17'; Nurzharyk Kunov (yellow card) 76'	Report	Vorotnikov (yellow card) 41'; Govedarica 47'; Adilet Kenessbek (yellow card) 52'; Baizhanov 72'	Stadium: FC Biik Stadium; Attendance: 100; Referee: Aleksey Bobrov

26 March 2018	Ak-Bet	1 – 4	Ekibastuz	Shymkent
17:00 (UTC+6)	Alexander Balaev 89'	Report	Ilya Sotnik 72'; Geysar Alakbarzadeh 74' (pen.), 84'; Madiyar Raimbek (yellow card) 80'; Evgeniy Mosin 86'	Stadium: FC Biik Stadium; Attendance: 50; Referee: Zhandos Abzhan

== Last 16 ==
18 April 2018	Kyran	0 – 6	Ordabasy	Shymkent
16:00 (UTC+6)	Vladimir Sedelnikov (red card) 22'; Serikbolsyn Turekhanov (yellow card) 72'	Report	Vitali Li 11', 69' (yellow card) 36'; Samat Shamshi (yellow card) 21'; Mardan Tolebek 23', 51'; Ular Zhaksybaev (yellow card) 39'; Ashirbekov 48'; Jighauri 82'	Stadium: Lokomotive Stadium; Attendance: 600; Referee: Georgy Chekhovsky

18 April 2018	Shakhter Karagandy	0 – 0 (a.e.t.) (7 – 6 p)	Kyzylzhar	Karaganda
16:00 (UTC+6)	Kirill Pasichnik (yellow card) 108'	Report	Delić (yellow card) 90+1'; Popkhadze (yellow card) 59' (yellow-red card) 120'	Stadium: Shakhter Stadium; Attendance: 800; Referee: Ruslan Sultangaliev
	Penalties
	Tkachuk (penalty scored); Kirill Pasichnik (penalty scored); Subotić (penalty scored); Aidos Tattybayev (penalty scored); Stojanović (penalty missed); Vyacheslav Putintsev (penalty scored); Najaryan (penalty scored); Gabyshev (penalty scored)		Stupić (penalty missed); Punoševac (penalty scored); Muldarov (penalty scored); Timur Muldinov (penalty scored); Coronel (penalty scored); Aslan Dzhanuzakov (penalty scored); Viktor Gunchenko (penalty scored); Ildar Aitov (penalty missed)

18 April 2018	Makhtaaral	3 – 1	Astana	Zhetisay
16:00 (UTC+6)	Oleg Pasechenko (yellow card) 35'; Elmar Nabiev (yellow card) 39' (goal) 80'; Geysar Alekperzade 42'; Askar Abutsov 57' (yellow card) 63'	Report	S.Sovet (yellow card) 64' Prokopenko 86'	Stadium: Kazhymukan Munaitpasov Stadium; Attendance: 3,500; Referee: Grigory Moskovchenko

18 April 2018	Taraz	0 – 0 (4 – 5 p)	Irtysh Pavlodar	Taraz
17:00 (UTC+6)	Adelit Kenesbek (yellow card) 2'; Govedarica (yellow card) 9'	Report	Shestakov (yellow card) 7'; Arman Smailov (yellow card) 19'; Madyar Ramazanov (yellow card) 105'	Stadium: Central Stadium; Attendance: 3,500; Referee: Arman Ismuratov
	Penalties
	Bekzat Shadmanov (penalty scored); Adilet Abdenabi (penalty scored); Govedarica (penalty scored); Abzal Taubay (penalty scored); Bauyrzhan Baitana (penalty scored)		Ilya Kalinin (penalty scored); Avrămia (penalty scored); Kislitsyn (penalty scored); Popadiuc (penalty scored); Ruslan Yesimov (penalty scored)

18 April 2018	Kaisar	2 – 0	Aktobe	Kyzylorda
16:00 (UTC+6)	Korobkin 13'; Baizhanov (yellow card) 27'; Zhangylyshbay 34'; Ilyas Amirseitov (yellow card) 71'; Marochkin (yellow card) 83'	Report	Ruslan Valiullin (yellow card) 20'; Miličević (yellow card) 90'	Stadium: Gani Muratbayev Stadium; Attendance: 2,500; Referee: Sergey Gorokhovodetsky

18 April 2018	Akzhayik	0 – 1	Atyrau	Oral
17:00 (UTC+6)	Erkin Tapalov (yellow card) 65'; Miram Sapanov (yellow card) 71'	Report	Ablitarov (yellow card) 27'; Maksimović 66' (pen.); Chichulin (yellow card) 74'	Stadium: Petr Atoyan Stadium; Attendance: 1,000; Referee: Askhat Abdanbayev

18 April 2018	Okzhetpes	3 – 5	Kairat	Kokshetau
14:00 (UTC+6)	Kasyanov 36'; Geteriev 49'; Abdulin 69'; Hoshkoderya (yellow card) 85'	Report	Islamkhan 5' (pen.), 66' (pen.), 70'; Paragulgov (yellow card) 35' (goal) 55'; Kassym (yellow card) 73'; Orazov (yellow card) 87'; Shvyrev 90+4'	Stadium: Okzhetpes Stadium; Attendance: 2,500; Referee: Zhandos Abzhan

18 April 2018	Tobol	1 – 0	Zhetysu	Kostanay
17:00 (UTC+6)	Darabayev (yellow card) 54'; Turysbek 65'; Kankava (yellow card) 90+2'	Report	Sadownichy (yellow card) 24'; Mawutor (yellow card) 50'	Stadium: Central Stadium; Attendance: 1,500; Referee: Bolat Saryev

== Quarterfinal ==
23 May 2018	Ordabasy	1 – 1 (a.e.t.) (3 – 4 p)	Kairat	Shymkent
18:00 (UTC+6)	Abiken 50' (o.g.); Fontanello (yellow card) 53'; Spahija (yellow card) 90+3'; Ular Zhaksybaev (yellow card) 111'	Report	Kuat (yellow card) 22'; Paragulgov (yellow card) 34'; Vorogovskiy 45'; Aleksandr Sokolenko (yellow card) 65'; Sarsenov (yellow card) 85'; Pokatilov (yellow card) 90+4'; Alip (yellow card) 101'; Artur Shushenachev (yellow card) 115'	Stadium: Kazhymukan Munaitpasov Stadium; Attendance: 4,000; Referee: Timur Kumashev
	Penalties
	Diakate (penalty scored); Fontanello (penalty missed); Jighauri (penalty scored); Ashirbekov (penalty scored); Nagaev (penalty missed)		(penalty scored) Abiken; (penalty scored) Aleksandr Sokolenko; (penalty missed) Maksim Kotov; (penalty scored) Sarsenov; (penalty scored) Alip

23 May 2018	Makhtaaral	0 – 3	Irtysh Pavlodar	Atakent
18:00 (UTC+6)		Report	Madiyar Ramazanov (yellow card) 31' (goal) 45+3'; Salami 58' (yellow card) 73'; Ruslan Yesimov (yellow card) 77'; Ilya Kalinin 90+2'	Stadium: Alpamis Batyr Stadion; Attendance: 1,000; Referee: Denis Tevyashov

23 May 2018	Atyrau	2 – 1	Tobol	Atyrau
19:00 (UTC+6)	Zyankovich 7', 66'; Rafkat Aslan (yellow card) 81'; Dauren Kayralliyev (yellow card) 88'	Report	Nusserbayev 56' Dmitrenko (yellow card) 90'	Stadium: Munaishy Stadium; Attendance: 800; Referee: Bagdat Abdullaev

23 May 2018	Shakhter Karagandy	2 – 1 (a.e.t.)	Kaisar	Temirtau
17:00 (UTC+6)	Tkachuk (yellow card) 33'; Sergei Shaff 56'; Najaryan (yellow card) 89'; Kojašević 119' (pen.)	Report	Kamara (yellow card) 35'; Dja Djédjé 41'; Arzhanov (yellow card) 88'; Zhangylyshbay (yellow card) 90+1'; Tazhimbetov (yellow card) 97'; Aybol Zhakhayev (yellow card) 119'	Stadium: Metallurg Stadium; Attendance: 500; Referee: Ruslan Omarov

== Semifinals ==
The four winners from the quarterfinals were drawn into two two-legged ties.

14 June 2018	Shakhter Karagandy	0 – 0	Atyrau	Karaganda
18:30 (UTC+6)	Mihunov (yellow card) 38'; Najaryan (yellow card) 72'; Yevgeny Tarasov (yellow card) 77'	Report	Ablitarov (yellow card) 77'	Stadium: Shakhter Stadium; Attendance: 2,500; Referee: Daniyar Sakhi

27 June 2018	Atyrau	3 – 1 (3 – 1 agg.)	Shakhter Karagandy	Atyrau
20:00 (UTC+6)	Sikimić 3'; Zyankovich 36'; Ruslan Esatov (yellow card) 53'; Rafkat Aslan (yellow card) 58'; Khairullin 62' (pen.); Dauren Kayralliyev (yellow card) 81'; Kuanish Kalmuratov (yellow card) 83'	Report	Vůch 16'; Shakhmetov (yellow card) 77'	Stadium: Munaishy Stadium; Attendance: 2,000; Referee: Saken Bayimbet

14 June 2018	Kairat	2 – 0	Irtysh Pavlodar	Almaty
19:00 (UTC+6)	Kuat 7' (yellow card) 19'; Alip (yellow card) 19'; Islamkhan 27'; Sarsenov (yellow card) 83'	Report	Dmitry Shmidt (yellow card) 30'	Stadium: Central Stadium; Attendance: 5,800; Referee: Askhat Abdanbayev

27 June 2018	Irtysh Pavlodar	3 – 1 (3 – 3 (a) agg.)	Kairat	Pavlodar
19:00 (UTC+6)	Fonseca 5', 70' (yellow card) 89'; Vladimir Vomenko 80'	Report	Paragulgov (yellow card) 26'; Bakhtiyarov 42'; Suyumbayev (yellow card) 44'	Stadium: Central Stadium; Attendance: 3,000; Referee: Denis Tevyashov

== Final ==
24 November 2018
15:00 (UTC+6)

Atyrau	0 – 1	Kairat
Obšivač (yellow card) 53'; Altynbek Saparov (yellow card) 83'; Khairullin (red card) 90+5'	Report	Aleksandr Sokolenko 16'; Sergey Keyler (yellow card) 41'; Shvyrev (yellow card) 90+3'

Astana Arena, Astana
Attendance: 4,500
Referee: Bakhyt Kyzylbaev

== Scorers ==
As of match played 24 November 2018

4 goals:

- (Kazakhstan) Bauyrzhan Islamkhan, Kairat
- (Kazakhstan) Nurlan Dairov, Okzhetpes

3 goals:

- (Belarus) Ihar Zyankovich, Atyrau
- (Kazakhstan) Yelmar Nabiev, Makhtaaral

2 goals:

- (Kazakhstan) Aliyar Muhamed, Akademiya Ontustik
- (Kazakhstan) Dauren Kaykibasov, Altai Semey
- (Kazakhstan) Alexei Shakir, Altai Semey
- (Kazakhstan) Konstantin Zarechniy, Altai Semey
- (Kazakhstan) Soltan Zhandos, Altai Semey
- (Kazakhstan) Magamed Uzdenov, Caspiy
- (Kazakhstan) Geysar Alakbarzadeh, Ekibastuz
- (Portugal) Carlos Fonseca, Irtysh Pavlodar
- (Kazakhstan) Kuanysh Begalin, Makhtaaral
- (Kazakhstan) Sanat Zhumakhanov, Okzhetpes
- (Kazakhstan) Vitali Li, Ordabasy
- (Kazakhstan) Mardan Tolebek, Ordabasy
- (Kazakhstan) Daniyar Nukebai, FC Ruzaevka

1 goals:

- (Kazakhstan) Alexander Balaev, Ak-Bet
- (Kazakhstan) Argen Manekeev, Akademiya Ontustik
- (Kazakhstan) Farukh Mirsalimbayev, Akademiya Ontustik
- (Kazakhstan) Shyngys Samenov, Akademiya Ontustik
- (Kazakhstan) Nurzhan Uais, Akademiya Ontustik
- (Kazakhstan) Oleg Ovchinnikov, Altai Semey
- (Kazakhstan) Altynbek Tuleyev, Altai Semey
- (Kazakhstan) Vladislav Prokopenko, Astana
- (Kazakhstan) Marat Khairullin, Atyrau
- (Serbia) Novica Maksimović, Atyrau
- (Serbia) Predrag Sikimić, Atyrau
- (Kazakhstan) Lawrence Elemesov, Caspiy
- (Kazakhstan) Samit Chulagov, CSKA Almaty
- (Kazakhstan) Dauren Suyunov, CSKA Almaty
- (Kazakhstan) Kasymzhan Taipov, CSKA Almaty
- (Kazakhstan) Evgeniy Mosin, Ekibastuz
- (Kazakhstan) Madiyar Raimbek, Ekibastuz
- (Kazakhstan) Ilya Sotnik, Ekibastuz
- (Kazakhstan) Ilya Kalinin, Irtysh Pavlodar
- (Kazakhstan) Madiyar Ramazanov, Irtysh Pavlodar
- (Kazakhstan) Vladimir Vomenko, Irtysh Pavlodar
- (Nigeria) Gbolahan Salami, Irtysh Pavlodar
- (Kazakhstan) Akmal Bakhtiyarov, Kairat
- (Kazakhstan) Islambek Kuat, Kairat
- (Kazakhstan) Magomed Paragulgov, Kairat
- (Kazakhstan) Vyacheslav Shvyrev, Kairat
- (Kazakhstan) Aleksandr Sokolenko, Kairat
- (Kazakhstan) Yan Vorogovskiy, Kairat
- (Ivory Coast) Franck Dja Djédjé, Kaisar
- (Kazakhstan) Valeri Korobkin, Kaisar
- (Kazakhstan) Toktar Zhangylyshbay, Kaisar
- (Kazakhstan) Maxim Filcakov, Kyran
- (Kazakhstan) Donis Ismailov, Kyran
- (Kazakhstan) Unknown, Kyran
- (Kazakhstan) Unknown, Kyran
- (Kazakhstan) Askar Abutov, Makhtaaral
- (Kazakhstan) Oleg Pasechenko, Makhtaaral
- (Kazakhstan) Roman Pavinic, Makhtaaral
- (Kazakhstan) Geysar Alekperzade, Makhtaaral
- (Kazakhstan) Askar Abutsov, Makhtaaral
- (Kazakhstan) Elmar Nabiev, Makhtaaral
- (Kazakhstan) Rinat Abdulin, Okzhetpes
- (Kazakhstan) Kazbek Geteriev, Okzhetpes
- (Kazakhstan) Anton Kuksin, Okzhetpes
- (Kazakhstan) Viktor Kryukov, Okzhetpes
- (Ukraine) Artem Kasyanov, Okzhetpes
- (Kazakhstan) Kairat Ashirbekov, Ordabasy
- (Georgia (country)) Jaba Jighauri, Ordabasy
- (Kazakhstan) Nursultan Zhaksylyk, Osdyussor Zhas Ulan
- (Kazakhstan) Ravil Saurambaev, FC Ruzaevka
- (Kazakhstan) Unknown, SDYuShOR 8
- (Kazakhstan) Unknown, SDYuShOR 8
- (Kazakhstan) Unknown, SDYuShOR 8
- (Kazakhstan) Unknown, SDYuShOR 8
- (Czech Republic) Egon Vůch, Shakhter Karagandy
- (Kazakhstan) Sergei Shaff, Shakhter Karagandy
- (Montenegro) Damir Kojašević, Shakhter Karagandy
- (Kazakhstan) Tanat Nusserbayev, Tobol
- (Kazakhstan) Bauyrzhan Turysbek, Tobol
- (Kazakhstan) Timur Baizhanov, Taraz
- (Kazakhstan) Duman Tursunbay, Taraz
- (Kazakhstan) Ilya Vorotnikov, Taraz
- (Serbia) Predrag Govedarica, Taraz

Own goal

- (Kazakhstan) Kenzhebek Zhasulan, Osdyussor Zhas Ulan (vs Akademiya Ontustik)
- (Kazakhstan) Nursultan Alibekova, Ak-Bet (vs Altai Semey)
- (Kazakhstan) Magamed Uzdenov, Caspiy (vs Kyran)
- (Kazakhstan) Aybol Abiken, Kairat (vs Ordabasy)
