= 2014 Kazakhstan Cup =

Tournament details
- Country: Kazakhstan
- Teams: 27

Final positions
- Champions: Kairat
- Runners-up: Aktobe

Tournament statistics
- Matches played: 28
- Goals scored: 85 (3.04 per match)
- Top goal scorer(s): Aslan Darabayev (Kairat) 3 Azat Nurgaliev, (Ordabasy) 3

The 2014 Kazakhstan Cup is the 23rd season of the Kazakhstan Cup, the annual nationwide football cup competition of Kazakhstan since the independence of the country. The competition begins on 22 April 2014, and will end with the final in November 2014. Shakhter Karagandy are the defending champions, having won their first cup in the 2013 competition.

The winner of the competition will qualify for the first qualifying round of the 2015–16 UEFA Europa League.

== First round ==
The draw was conducted in 2014 at the offices of the Football Federation of Kazakhstan. Entering this round are the 22 clubs from both the Premier League and First Division seasons. The matches took place on 23 April 2014.

23 April 2014	Bayterek (2)	0–4	Tobol (1)	Astana Arena, Astana
14:00		Report	Bugaiov 30'; Bogdanov 47'; Malyshev 56'; Jalilov 79'	Referee: Rustam Omarov (Almaty)

23 April 2014	Okzhetpes (2)	1–3	Kairat (1)	Okzhetpes Stadium, Kokshetau
14:00	Buleshev 90'	Report	Lačný 4', 26'; Nekhtiy 89'	Referee: Timur Kumasev (Astana)

23 April 2014	Kyran (2)	3–0	Akzhayik (2)	Kazhimukan Munaitpasov Stadium, Shymkent
15:00	Chikrizov 42'; Nabiyev 59'; Chikrizov 82'	Report		Attendance: 700; Referee: Daniar Sakhi (Kyzylorda)

23 April 2014	CSKA Almaty (2)	0–3	Kyzylzhar (2)	Stadion CSKA, Almaty
16:00		Report	Dosmanbetov 16'; Bekmukhaev 74'; Miller 78'	Attendance: 300; Referee: Georgiy Chekhovskiy (Astana)

23 April 2014	Ekibastuz (2)	0–3	Ordabasy (1)	Shakhtyor Stadium, Ekibastuz
16:00		Report	Nurgaliev 19' (pen.), 43', 52' (pen.)	Attendance: 1000; Referee: Stanislav Lesiv (Semey)

23 April 2014	Lashyn (2)	2–0	Spartak Semey (1)	Ortaliq Stadium, Karatau
16:00	Yakovlev 29', 79' (pen.)	Report		Referee: Bolat Sariev (Uralsk)

23 April 2014	Zhetysu-Sunkar (2)	0–2	Kaisar (1)	Zhetysu Stadium, Taldykorgan
16:00		Report	Hunt 44'; Narzildaev 54'	Referee: Dmitry Bistrov (Saran)

23 April 2014	Bolat (2)	0–2	Atyrau (1)	Metallurg Stadium, Temirtau
17:00		Report	Gridin 54'; Essame 71'	Attendance: 150; Referee: Bagdat Abdulaiev (Karatau)

23 April 2014	Gefest (2)	5–1	Zhetysu (1)	Stadium Sunkar, Karagandy
17:00	Antonenko 46', 68'; Yegor Levin 82'; Ablakimov 85'; Serdiukov 90'	Report	Esimkhanov 77'	Attendance: 500; Referee: Igor Aleshin (Pavlodar)

23 April 2014	Astana-1964 (2)	4–0	Maktaaral (2)	Kazhimukan Munaitpasov Stadium, Astana
18:00	Iskulov 4' (pen.); Sedko 29', 36'; Panashenko 60'	Report		Referee: Bakhit Kizilbaev (Aktobe)

23 April 2014	Caspiy (2)	1–4	Vostok (1)	Zhastar Stadium, Aktau
18:00	Zhahanov 47' (o.g.)		Moltusinov 2'; Ibraev 25', 51'; Utrobin 58'	Attendance: 1500; Referee: Denis Teviashov (Uralsk)

== Second round ==
14 May 2014	Vostok (1)	1–2 (a.e.t.)	Atyrau (1)	Vostok Stadium, Oskemen
17:00	Januzakov 85'		Trifunović 5'; Parkhachev 117'

14 May 2014	Taraz (1)	3–0	Ordabasy (1)	Taraz Central Stadium, Taraz
17:00	Kozhamberdy 15'; Ubbink 55'; 63' (pen.)

14 May 2014	Irtysh Pavlodar (1)	3–1	FC Kyzylzhar (2)	Pavlodar Central Stadium, Pavlodar
18:00	Burzanović 27', 33'; Goloveshkin 90'		Kenetaev 60'

14 May 2014	Tobol (1)	1–0	Kyran (2)	Kostanay Central Stadium, Kostanay
18:00	Bogdanov 90'

14 May 2014	Kaisar (1)	0–3	Aktobe (1)	Gany Muratbayev Stadium, Kyzylorda
18:00			Zyankovich 56'; Aimbetov 59'; Korobkin 85'

14 May 2014	Astana (1)	1–0	Astana-64 (2)	Astana Arena, Astana
19:00	Ostapenko 61'

14 May 2014	Kairat (1)	3–1	Gefest (2)	Almaty Central Stadium, Almaty
19:00	Ceesay 19'; Yedigaryan 37'; Kuantan 78'		Muzhikov 51'

14 May 2014	Shakhter Karagandy (1)	3–0	Lashyn (2)	Shakhtyor Stadium, Karagandy
19:00	Topcagić 64'; Gabyshev 67'; Murtazayev 74'

== Quarter-finals ==
18 June 2014	Shakhter Karagandy (1)	1–0	Irtysh Pavlodar (1)	Shakhtyor Stadium, Karagandy
18:30	Murzoev 61'			Referee: Ashat Abdanbaev

18 June 2014	Astana (1)	4–0	Tobol (1)	Astana Arena, Astana
19:00	Kojašević 45', 47'; Cícero 76'; Kéthévoama 87'			Referee: Alexander Gauzer

18 June 2014	Atyrau (1)	1–3	Kairat (1)	Munaishy Stadium, Atyrau
19:30	Trifunović 38'		Darabayev 59'; Islamkhan 66'; Knežević 70'

18 June 2014	Aktobe (1)	2–1	Taraz (1)	Central Stadium, Aktobe
20:00	Antonov 22', 88'		Tleshev 62'	Referee: Viktor Antonov

== Semi-finals ==
16 August 2014	Aktobe	1–1	Astana	Central Stadium, Aktobe
	Pizzelli 63'		Foxi 26'

24 September 2014	Astana	1-1 (2-2 agg.) (3 – 4 p)	Aktobe	Astana Arena, Astana
18:00	Nusserbayev 41'		Pizzelli 20' (pen.)	Attendance: 2000
	Penalties
	Goryachy (penalty scored); Muzhikov (penalty scored); Postnikov (penalty missed); Zhukov (penalty missed); Kojašević (penalty scored)		Khairullin (penalty scored); Tagybergen (penalty scored); Antonov (penalty scored); Arzumanyan (penalty missed); Pizzelli (penalty scored)

16 August 2014	Kairat	2–0	Shakhter Karagandy	Central Stadium, Almaty
	Riera 20'; Darabaev 86'

24 September 2014	Shakhter Karagandy	0-2 (0-4 agg.)	Kairat	Shakhtyor Stadium, Karagandy
			Isael 83'; Kislitsyn 87'

== Final ==
22 November 2014
15:00 (UTC+6)

Kairat	4–1	Aktobe
Arzumanyan 19' (o.g.); Gohou 30', 64'; Darabayev 85'		Logvinenko 29'

Astana Arena, Astana
Referee: Ruslan Duzmambetov (Oskemen)

== Scorers ==
3 goals:

- (Kazakhstan) Aslan Darabayev, Kairat
- (Kazakhstan) Azat Nurgaliev, Ordabasy

2 goals:

- (Ukraine) Oleksiy Antonov, Aktobe
- (Armenia) Marcos Pizzelli, Aktobe
- (Kazakhstan) Ernest Sedko, Astana-1964
- (Montenegro) Damir Kojašević, Astana
- (Central African Republic) Foxi Kéthévoama, Astana
- (Serbia) Miloš Trifunović, Atyrau
- (Kazakhstan) Evgeniy Antonenko, Gefest
- (Montenegro) Igor Burzanović, Irtysh Pavlodar
- (Ivory Coast) Gerard Gohou, Kairat
- (Slovakia) Miloš Lačný, Kairat
- (Kazakhstan) Eugene Chikrizov, Kyran
- (Kazakhstan) Vladimir Yakovlev, Lashyn
- (Kazakhstan) Anatoli Bogdanov, Tobol
- (Kazakhstan) Sabyrkhan Ibraev, Vostok
- (Kazakhstan) Murat Tleshev, Taraz

1 goal:

- (Kazakhstan) Abat Aimbetov, Aktobe
- (Kazakhstan) Valeri Korobkin, Aktobe
- (Kazakhstan) Yuriy Logvinenko, Aktobe
- (Belarus) Ihar Zyankovich, Aktobe
- (Guinea-Bissau) Cícero, Astana
- (Kazakhstan) Tanat Nusserbayev, Astana
- (Kazakhstan) Sergei Ostapenko, Astana
- (Kazakhstan) Marat Iskulov, Astana-1964
- (Kazakhstan) Evgeny Panashenko, Astana-1964
- (Cameroon) Guy Essame, Atyrau
- (Kazakhstan) Sergey Gridin, Atyrau
- (Belarus) Dmitri Parkhachev, Atyrau
- (Kazakhstan) Rustam Jahanov, Caspiy
- (Kyrgyzstan) Roman Ablakimov, Gefest
- (Russia) Yegor Levin, Gefest
- (Kazakhstan) Marlan Muzhikov, Gefest
- (Kazakhstan) Vyacheslav Serdiukov, Gefest
- (Kazakhstan) Vitaliy Goloveshkin, Irtysh Pavlodar
- (The Gambia) Momodou Ceesay, Kairat
- (Brazil) Isael, Kairat
- (Kazakhstan) Bauyrzhan Islamkhan, Kairat
- (Kazakhstan) Aleksandr Kislitsyn, Kairat
- (Croatia) Josip Knežević, Kairat
- (Kazakhstan) Ermek Kuantan, Kairat
- (Ukraine) Vladyslav Nekhtiy, Kairat
- (Spain) Sito Riera, Kairat
- (Armenia) Artur Yedigaryan, Kairat
- (Kazakhstan) Elmar Nabiyev, Kyran
- (Kazakhstan) Erlen Bekmukhaev, Kyzylzhar
- (Kazakhstan) Serik Dosmanbetov, Kyzylzhar
- (Kazakhstan) Ruslan Kenetaev, FC Kyzylzhar
- (Kazakhstan) Vitali Miller, Kyzylzhar
- (Estonia) Rimo Hunt, Kaisar
- (Kazakhstan) Duman Narzildaev, Kaisar
- (Kazakhstan) Alibek Buleshev, Okzhetpes
- (Kazakhstan) Mikhail Gabyshev, Shakhter Karagandy
- (Kazakhstan) Roman Murtazayev, Shakhter Karagandy
- (Kazakhstan) Kamoliddin Murzoev, Shakhter Karagandy
- (Bosnia and Herzegovina) Mihret Topcagić, Shakhter Karagandy
- (Kazakhstan) Zhakyp Kozhamberdy, Taraz
- (Netherlands) Desley Ubbink, Taraz
- (Moldova) Igor Bugaiov, Tobol
- (Kazakhstan) Raul Jalilov, Tobol
- (Kazakhstan) Aleksei Malyshev, Tobol
- (Kazakhstan) Januzakov, Vostok
- (Kazakhstan) Anton Moltusinov, Vostok
- (Kazakhstan) Nikita Utrobin, Vostok
- (Kazakhstan) Alisher Esimkhanov, Zhetysu

Own goal

Robert Arzumanyan (22 November 2014 vs Kairat)
