= 2014 Kazakhstan First Division =

Kazakhstan First Division
- Season: 2014
- Champions: Okzhetpes
- Promoted: Okzhetpes
- Relegated: Maktaaral
- Matches: 230
- Goals: 598 (2.6 per match)

The 2014 Kazakhstan First Division was the 20th edition of Kazakhstan First Division, the second-level football competition in Kazakhstan. 15 teams to play against each other on home-away system. The top team gains promotion to the Premier League next season, while the second-placed team enters playoff series with the eleventh team of the Premier League.

== Teams ==
=== Stadia and locations ===
Location of teams in 2014 Kazakhstan First Division

=== Foreign players ===
The number of foreign players is restricted to three per team. A team can use all of them on the field in each game.

Club	Player 1	Player 2	Player 3
Akzhayik	(Slovenia) **Borut Semler**	(Bulgaria) Ivan Mihov	-
Astana-64	(Ivory Coast) Dramane Kone	(Uzbekistan) Pavel Purishkin	(Uzbekistan) Ernes Sed'ko
Bayterek	-	-	-
Bolat	-	-	-
Caspiy	(Bulgaria) Pavel Stanev	(Russia) Aleksandr Petrov	(Russia) Yuri Skornyakov
CSKA Almaty	-	-	-
Ekibastuz	-	-	-
Gefest	(Kyrgyzstan) **Ruslan Amirov**	(Russia) Yegor Levin	(Uzbekistan) Akbarzhon Khodzhaev
Kyran	(Netherlands) Murat Önal	-	-
Kyzylzhar	(Ukraine) Oleksandr Zgura	(Georgia (country)) David Chagelishvili	(Georgia (country)) Levani Chagelishvili
Lashyn	-	-	-
FC Maktaaral	(Ukraine) Vadym Barba	(Uzbekistan) Timur Vasiliev	(Uzbekistan) Abdurazzok Dzhurayev
Okzhetpes	(Kyrgyzstan) **Anatoliy Vlasichev**	-	-
Vostok	(Ukraine) Vitali Kuyanov	-	-
Zhetysu-Sunkar	-	-	-

In bold: Players that have been capped for their national team.

Last updated 28 June 2014.

== League table ==
Pos	Team	Pld	W	D	L	GF	GA	GD	Pts	Promotion or qualification
1	Okzhetpes (C, P)	28	21	1	6	59	33	+26	64	Promotion to the Kazakhstan Premier League
2	Kyran	28	19	3	6	60	30	+30	60	Qualification for the promotion play-offs
3	Astana-1964	28	17	4	7	54	29	+25	55	
4	Caspiy	28	17	4	7	44	26	+18	55	
5	Akzhayik	28	16	7	5	46	24	+22	55	
6	Vostok	28	14	5	9	48	31	+17	47	
7	Ekibastuz	28	11	8	9	40	35	+5	41	
8	Sunkar	28	11	7	10	42	39	+3	40	
9	Kyzylzhar	28	12	1	15	41	45	−4	37	
10	Bayterek	28	10	2	16	34	52	−18	32	
11	Lashyn	28	7	6	15	23	42	−19	27	
12	CSKA Almaty	28	6	6	16	32	54	−22	24	
13	Bolat	28	7	2	19	26	40	−14	23	
14	Gefest	28	6	3	19	16	56	−40	21	
15	Maktaaral	28	4	5	19	33	62	−29	17	

Source: Soccerway (in Russian)
Rules for classification: 1st points;
Two team tiebreak: 1st overall wins; 2nd head-to-head record; 3rd goals difference; 4th goals scored; 5th away goals scored;
Multiple teams tiebreak: 1st overall wins; 2nd goals difference; 3rd goals scored; 4th away goals scored
(C) Champions; (P) Promoted

== Promotion play-offs ==
16 November 2014
11:00 (UTC+6)

Taraz	1–1 (a.e.t.)	Kyran
Yarovenko 59'	Summary	Zhumakhanov 24' (red card) 120'
Penalties
	3–1

Astana Arena
Referee: Aidyn Rahinbaev
