= 2015 Kazakhstan Cup =

Tournament details
- Country: Kazakhstan
- Teams: 25

Final positions
- Champions: Kairat
- Runners-up: Astana

Tournament statistics
- Matches played: 26
- Goals scored: 67 (2.58 per match)
- Top goal scorer: Patrick Twumasi 6

The 2015 Kazakhstan Cup is the 24th season of the Kazakhstan Cup, the annual nationwide football cup competition of Kazakhstan since the independence of the country. The competition began on 29 March 2015 and will end with the final in November 2015. Kairat are the defending champions, having won their first cup in the 2014 competition.

The winner of the competition will qualify for the first qualifying round of the 2016–17 UEFA Europa League.

== Participating clubs ==
The following 25 teams qualified for the competition:

Premier League all clubs of season 2015	First Division all clubs of season 2015
FC Aktobe; FC Astana; FC Atyrau; FC Taraz; Irtysh Pavlodar; Kairat Almaty; Kaisar Kyzylorda; Okzhetpes Kokshetau; Ordabasy Shymkent; Shakhter Karagandy; Tobol Kostanay; Zhetysu Taldykorgan	Аkzhayik Oral; Baikonur Kyzylorda; Bayterek Astana; Bolat-AMT Temirtau; Caspiy Aktau; CSKA Almaty; FC Ekibastuz; Kyzyl-Zhar SK Petropavl; Kyran Shymkent; Lashyn Taraz; Maktaaral Atakent; Spartak Semey; Vostok Oskemen

== Schedule ==
The rounds of the 2015 competition are scheduled as follows:

- Preliminary Round: 29 March 2015
- Round 1: 12 April 2015
- Round 2: 29 April 2015
- Quarterfinal: 20 May 2015
- Semifinal: 2 June–23 September 2015
- Final: 21 November 2015 at Astana Arena, Astana

== Preliminary round ==
Matches of the preliminary round took place on March 29, 2015 and featured the 10 lowest placed clubs from the Kazakhstan First Division.

29 March 2015	Lashyn (2)	0 – 2	Bolat-AMT (2)	Taraz
15:00	Karpykov (yellow card) 44'	Report	R.Pavinic 14'; D.Zverev 82'	Stadium: Lashyn Stadium; Attendance: 150; Referee: Grigoriy Moskovshenko

29 March 2015	Kyran (2)	1 – 2	Caspiy (2)	Shymkent
15:00	M.Filshakov 31'; Joldasov (yellow card) 48'	Report	Con (yellow card) 51'; V.Serdyukov 72'; V.Vyatkin 80'; Kabylan (yellow card) 86'	Stadium: K.Munaitpasov stadium Attendance: 100; Referee: Sergey Dengin

29 March 2015	Ekibastuz (2)	4 – 0	Bayterek (2)	Ekibastuz
15:00	T.Aubakirov 11', 83' (pen.); Pavlenok 47'; Duisembaev 90+2'; Kenih (yellow card) 90+3'	Report	Mirsalimbaev (yellow card) 17'	Stadium: Shakhtyor Stadium; Attendance: 1,000; Referee: Lesiv

29 March 2015	Maktaaral (2)	0 – 1	Akzhayik (2)	Atakent
15:00	Suyunov (yellow card) 16'; Peterson (yellow card) 87'	Report	Shurygin 73'	Stadium: Alpamys batyr stadium Attendance: 2,500; Referee: Ruslan Omarov

29 March 2015	Baikonur (2)	0 – 1	Kyzyl-Zhar SK (2)	Kyzylorda
16:00		Report	Nabiyev 71'; Prokopenko (yellow card) 80'; Chudinov (yellow card) 85'	Stadium: Lokomotive Stadium; Attendance: 600; Referee: Kyzylbaev

== First round ==
Matches of the first round took place on 11/12 April 2015 and featured the 5 winners from the preliminary round and the three remaining Kazakhstan First Division teams.

11 April 2015	Spartak Semey (2)	1 – 0	Kyzyl-Zhar SK (2)	Oskemen
15:00	Birkurmanov (yellow card) 32'; T.Danilyuk 47'; Baizhanov (yellow card) 55'; Kutsov (yellow card) 88'	Report	Aliyev (yellow card) 50'; Chudinov (yellow card) 81'; Chagelishvili (yellow card) 88'	Stadium: Vostok Stadium; Attendance: 500; Referee: Sergey Gorokhovodatskiy

12 April 2015	Vostok (2)	2 – 2 (a.e.t.) (1 – 4 p)	Akzhayik (2)	Oskemen
15:00	Shakin (yellow card) 21'; V.Erbes 80'; Kuyanov 117'	Report	Khromtsov 13'; Tapalov (yellow card) 49'; Shurigin (yellow card) 53'; Shapurin (yellow card) 81'; Antipov 91'	Stadium: Vostok Stadium; Attendance: 1,000; Referee: Ivan Filatov

12 April 2015	Ekibastuz (2)	2 – 0	Bolat-AMT (2)	Ekibastuz
15:00	Iskulov 12'; Bersugurov (yellow card) 14'; Derkach (yellow card) 29'; Voynov (yellow card) 35' (goal) 73'; Danaev (red card) 80'	Report	Fyodorov (yellow card) 21'	Stadium: Shakhtyor Stadium; Attendance: 800; Referee: Galymzhan Kenzhalinov

12 April 2015	Caspiy (2)	1 – 1 (a.e.t.) (7 – 8 p)	CSKA Almaty (2)	Aktau
16:00	Vyatkin 2'; Nokhrin (yellow card) 67'; Serdyukov (yellow card) 70'; Kadyrbaev (yellow card) 95'; Vyatkin (yellow card) 118'	Report	Baltabekov (yellow card) 14'; Shulagov 35'; Izatov (yellow card) 70'; Shabdenov (yellow card) 71'; Shvydko (yellow card) 76'; Kavakidi (yellow card) 111'	Stadium: Zhastar Stadium; Attendance: 3,000; Referee: Furkat Atazhanov

== Second round ==
Matches of the second round took place on 28/29 April 2015 and featured the 4 winners from the first round and the 12 Kazakhstan Premier League teams.

28 March 2015	Kaisar (1)	1 – 0	Spartak Semey (2)	Kyzylorda
17:00	Kutsov 50' (o.g.); R.Rozybakiev (yellow card) 81'	Report	Malyshev (yellow card) 79'	Stadium: Gany Muratbayev Stadium; Attendance: 3,000; Referee: Baghdad Abdullayev

29 April 2015	Ekibastuz (2)	2 – 3	Astana (1)	Ekibastuz
15:00	A.Duisembaev (yellow card) 62' (goal) 90'; T.Aubakirov 69'; Isakov (yellow card) 82'; Bursugurov (yellow card) 90+2'	Report	Twumasi 12', 53'; Shchetkin 35'; Nusserbayev (yellow card) 89'	Stadium: Shakhter Stadium; Attendance: 1,800; Referee: Daniyar Sakhi

29 April 2015	Shakhter Karagandy (1)	1 – 2 (a.e.t.)	Okzhetpes (1)	Karaganda
16:00	Smejkal 6' (o.g.); Paryvaew (yellow card) 17'; Pokrivač (yellow card) 40'	Report	Rotkovic 55' (yellow card) 120'; Sakhalbayev 98'	Stadium: Shakhter Stadium; Attendance: 500; Referee: Aydyn Rakhimbayev

29 April 2015	Ordabasy (1)	0 – 1	Taraz (1)	Shymkent
17:00	Trajković (yellow card) 19'; Kozhabayev (yellow card) 27'	Report	Toktybayev (yellow card) 24' (goal) 63'; V.Evstigneev (yellow card) 53'	Stadium: Kazhimukan Munaitpasov Stadium; Attendance: 2,000; Referee: Ruslan Duzmambetov

29 April 2015	Tobol (1)	2 – 1	CSKA Almaty (2)	Kostanay
18:00	K.Korotkevich (yellow card) 9'; T.Elmurzayev 44'; Bugaev 62'; Šimkovič (yellow card) 83'	Report	Orazaev 10' (pen.); Izatov (yellow card) 12'; Kavakidi (yellow card) 73'; Andreev (yellow card) 83'; Shvydko (yellow card) 88'	Stadium: Central Stadium; Attendance: 1,500; Referee: Bolat Sariyev

29 April 2015	Akzhayik (2)	0 – 5	Aktobe (1)	Oral
18:00		Report	Korobkin 11'; D.Zhalmukan 21', 46'; Dmitrenko 42'; Antonov 78'	Stadium: Petr Atoyan Stadium; Attendance: 2,500; Referee: Timur Kumashev

29 April 2015	Atyrau (1)	0 – 1	Zhetysu (1)	Atyrau
18:00	A.Marov (yellow card) 69'; Diakate (yellow card) 88'; Essame (yellow card) 88'	Report	Savić (yellow card) 77'; Turysbek 79'	Stadium: Munaishy Stadium; Attendance: 4,000; Referee: Denis Tevyashov

29 April 2015	Kairat (1)	0 – 0 (4 – 1 p)	Irtysh (1)	Almaty
18:00	Isael (yellow card) 15'; Pliyev (yellow card) 56'	Report	Chernyshov (yellow card) 15'; Aliev (yellow card) 33'; I.Graf (yellow card) 66'; G.Sartakov (yellow card) 80'; Gatagov (yellow card) 116'; N.Kalmykov (yellow card) 120'	Stadium: Central Stadium; Attendance: 6,500; Referee: Igor Shesnokov
	Penalties
	Gohou (penalty scored); Isael (penalty scored); Islamkhan (penalty scored); Darabayev (penalty scored)		Bance (penalty missed); Bulgaru (penalty missed); Azuka (penalty scored)

== Quarter finals ==
On 30 April 2015, the eight winners from the Second Round were drawn in to four Quarter Final ties, to be played on 20 May 2015.

20 May 2015	Okzhetpes (1)	2 – 3	Aktobe (1)	Kokshetau
18:00	Rotković 25' (pen.); Azovskiy 90'	Report	Pizzelli 20'; Pokatilov (yellow card) 24'; Žulpa 41' (yellow card) 81'; Neco 45+1'; Dmitrenko (yellow card) 49'	Stadium: Okzhetpes Stadium; Attendance: 3,000; Referee: Ruslan Duzmambetov

20 May 2015	Tobol (1)	2 – 0	Zhetysu (1)	Kostanay
18:00	Šimkovič 6'; A.Deli 83'	Report	Savić (yellow card) 35'; S.Sagyndykov (yellow card) 74'	Stadium: Central Stadium; Attendance: 2,000; Referee: Askhat Abdanbayev

20 May 2015	Kaisar (1)	1 – 2 (a.e.t.)	Astana (1)	Kyzylorda
18:00	Shestakov (yellow card) 38'; Piroska (yellow card) 44'; Junuzović 45'; Klein (yellow card) 94'	Report	Kéthévoama (yellow card) 31'; Akhmetov (yellow card) 57'; Twumasi 69', 110'	Stadium: Gany Muratbayev Stadium; Attendance: 2,000; Referee: Denis Izmailov

20 May 2015	Kairat (1)	4 – 1	Taraz (1)	Almaty
19:00	Gohou 6', 58'; Islamkhan 13'; Kukeyev 87'	Report	S.Zhumahanov (yellow card) 16'; A.Taubay (yellow card) 28'; Mukhutdinov 62' (pen.)	Stadium: Central Stadium; Attendance: 7,500; Referee: Igor Aleshin

== Semi-finals ==
Team 1	Agg.	Team 2	1st leg	2nd leg
Aktobe	1 – 3	Astana	0 – 2	1 – 1
Tobol	1 – 5	Kairat	0 – 3	1 – 2

2 June 2015 1st leg	Aktobe	0 – 2	Astana	Aktobe
19:00 (UTC+6)	A.Tagybergen (yellow card) 28'	Summary	Dzholchiev 19'; B.Kulbekov 33'; Twumasi (yellow card) 72'; Shomko (yellow card) 90+1'	Stadium: Central Stadium; Attendance: 3,000; Referee: Igor Aleshin

23 September 2015 2nd leg	Astana	1 – 1 (3 – 1 agg.)	Aktobe	Astana
18:00 (UTC+6)	Shomko (yellow card) 66'; Twumasi 68'	Summary	Mineiro (yellow card) 35'; Khizhnichenko 40'	Stadium: Astana Arena; Attendance: 4,500; Referee: Ruslan Duzmambetov

2 June 2015 1st leg	Tobol	0 – 3	Kairat	Kostanay
20:00 (UTC+6)	Sadownichy (yellow card) 45'	Summary	Gohou 18'; Marković (yellow card) 31'; T.Rudoselskiy (yellow card) 47'; Islamkhan 59'; Isael 76'	Stadium: Central Stadium; Attendance: 4,000; Referee: Marat Iskakov

23 September 2015 2nd leg	Kairat	2 – 1 (5 – 1 agg.)	Tobol	Almaty
20:00 (UTC+6)	Riera 8'; Gorman 19'	Summary	Kurgulin (yellow card) 75'; Zhumaskaliyev 89'	Stadium: Central Stadium; Attendance: 7,000; Referee: Denis Tevyashov

== Final ==
21 November 2015
15:00 (UTC+6)

Kairat	2–1	Astana
Despotović 48', 70'		Twumasi 28'

Astana Arena, Astana
Attendance: 10,500
Referee: Cüneyt Çakir (Turkey)

== Scorers ==
6 goals:

- (Ghana) Patrick Twumasi, Astana

4 goals:

- (Serbia) Đorđe Despotović, Kairat

3 goals:

- (Kazakhstan) Azamat Aubakirov, Ekibastuz
- (Ivory Coast) Gerard Gohou, Kairat

2 goals:

- (Kazakhstan) Didar Zhalmukan, Aktobe
- (Kazakhstan) Vladimir Vyatkin, Caspiy
- (Kazakhstan) Amangeldy Duisembaev, Ekibastuz
- (Kazakhstan) Bauyrzhan Islamkhan, Kairat
- (Montenegro) Luka Rotkovic, Okzhetpes

1 goal:

- (Armenia) Marcos Pizzelli, Aktobe
- (Brazil) Danilo Neco, Aktobe
- (Kazakhstan) Viktor Dmitrenko, Aktobe
- (Kazakhstan) Valeri Korobkin, Aktobe
- (Kazakhstan) Sergei Khizhnichenko, Aktobe
- (Lithuania) Artūras Žulpa, Aktobe
- (Ukraine) Oleksiy Antonov, Aktobe
- (Kazakhstan) Ivan Antipov, Akzhayik
- (Kazakhstan) Igor Khromtsov, Akzhayik
- (Kazakhstan) Anton Shurygin, Akzhayik
- (Kazakhstan) Bauyrzhan Dzholchiev, Astana
- (Kazakhstan) Birjan Kulbekov, Astana
- (Kazakhstan) Aleksey Shchetkin, Astana
- (Kazakhstan) Roman Pavinic, Bolat-AMT
- (Kazakhstan) Dmitri Zverev, Bolat-AMT
- (Kazakhstan) Vyasheslav Serdyukov, Caspiy
- (Kazakhstan) Aslan Orazaev, CSKA Almaty
- (Kazakhstan) Samit Shulagov, CSKA Almaty
- (Kazakhstan) Marat Iskulov, Ekibastuz
- (Kazakhstan) Viktor Pavlenok, Ekibastuz
- (Kazakhstan) Igor Voynov, Ekibastuz
- (Brazil) Isael, Kairat
- (Kazakhstan) Zhambyl Kukeyev, Kairat
- (Kazakhstan) Mark Gorman, Kairat
- (Spain) Sito Riera, Kairat
- (Croatia) Edin Junuzović, Kaisar
- (Kazakhstan) Maxim Filshakov, Kyran
- (Kazakhstan) Elmar Nabiyev, Kyzylzhar
- (Kazakhstan) Egor Azovskiy, Okzhetpes
- (Kazakhstan) Ruslan Sakhalbayev, Okzhetpes
- (Kazakhstan) Taras Danilyuk, Spartak Semey
- (Kazakhstan) Marat Togyzbay, Taraz
- (Russia) Almir Mukhutdinov, Taraz
- (Austria) Tomáš Šimkovič, Tobol
- (Kazakhstan) Artem Deli, Tobol
- (Kazakhstan) Temirlan Elmurzayev, Tobol
- (Kazakhstan) Nurbol Zhumaskaliyev, Tobol
- (Moldova) Igor Bugaev, Tobol
- (Kazakhstan) Vyasheslav Erbes, Vostok
- (Kazakhstan) Vitali Kuyanov, Vostok
- (Kazakhstan) Bauyrzhan Turysbek, Zhetysu

Own goal

- (Kyrgyzstan) Sergey Kutsov (28 April 2015 vs Kaisar)
- (Czech Republic) Michal Smejkal (29 April 2015 vs Shakhter Karagandy)
