= Yan Vorogovsky =

Kazakhstani footballer

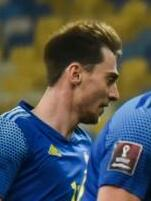
- Vorogovsky in 2021

Personal information
- Full name: Yan Vladimirovich Vorogovsky
- Date of birth: 7 August 1996 (age 30)
- Place of birth: Talgar, Almaty Region, Kazakhstan
- Height: 1.82 m (6 ft 0 in)
- Position: Midfielder

Team information
- Current team: Astana
- Number: 6

Senior career*
Years	Team	Apps	(Gls)
2013	Ak Bulak	18	(2)
2014	Sunkar	19	(2)
2015	Kaisar	24	(1)
2016–2019	Kairat	53	(1)
2019–2021	Beerschot	40	(2)
2021–2022	Kairat	5	(0)
2022	→ RWDM (loan)	10	(2)
2022–2023	RWDM	32	(3)
2023–	Astana	72	(4)

International career^{‡}
2017–	Kazakhstan	69	(7)
- * Club domestic league appearances and goals as of 1 November 2026 ‡ National team caps and goals as of 18 November 2026

Yan Vladimirovich Vorogovsky (Russian: Ян Владимирович Вороговский; born 7 August 1996) is a Kazakh professional footballer who plays as a midfielder for Astana.

== Career ==
=== Club ===
On 29 June 2019, Vorogovsky moved from FC Kairat to K Beerschot VA, signing a one-year contract with the Belgian club.

In June 2021, it was reported that Vorogovsky was on trial with Russian Premier League club Akhmat Grozny.

On 18 January 2022, Vorogovsky joined RWDM in Belgium on loan with an option to buy. RWDM exercised the option to make transfer permanent on 1 July 2022.

== Career statistics ==
=== Club ===
As of match played 18 April 2021

Appearances and goals by club, season and competition
Club	Season	League			National Cup		Continental		Other		Total	
Club	Season	Division	Apps	Goals	Apps	Goals	Apps	Goals	Apps	Goals	Apps	Goals
Ak Bulak	2013	Kazakhstan First Division	18	2			-		-		18	2
Sunkar	2014	Kazakhstan First Division	19	2			-		-		19	2
Kaisar	2015	Kazakhstan Premier League	24	1	1	0	-		-		25	1
Kairat	2016	Kazakhstan Premier League	6	0	2	0	1	0	0	0	9	0
Kairat	2017	Kazakhstan Premier League	13	0	4	0	1	0	0	0	18	0
Kairat	2018	Kazakhstan Premier League	22	1	4	1	3	1	0	0	29	3
Kairat	2019	Kazakhstan Premier League	12	0	1	0	0	0	1	0	14	0
Beerschot	2019–20	Jupiler Pro League	19	1	2	0	-		-		21	1
Beerschot	2020–21	Jupiler Pro League	21	1	1	0	-		-		22	1
Beerschot	Total		40	2	3	0	-	-	-	-	43	2
Kairat	2021	Kazakhstan Premier League	5	0	5	0	6	0	-		16	0
Kairat	Kairat Total		58	1	16	1	11	1	1	0	86	3
Career total			159	8	20	1	11	1	1	0	191	10

=== International ===
As of match played 16 November 2026

Appearances and goals by national team and year
National team	Year	Apps	Goals
Kazakhstan	2017	1	0
Kazakhstan	2018	2	0
Kazakhstan	2019	8	1
Kazakhstan	2020	5	0
Kazakhstan	2021	7	0
Kazakhstan	2022	6	1
Kazakhstan	2023	10	2
Kazakhstan	2024	11	1
Kazakhstan	2025	10	0
Kazakhstan	2026	8	2
Total		69	7

Scores and results list Kazakhstan's goal tally first, score column indicates score after each Vorogovsky goal.

List of international goals scored by Yan Vorogovsky
No.	Date	Venue	Opponent	Score	Result	Competition
1	21 March 2019	Astana Arena, Astana, Kazakhstan	Scotland	2–0	3–0	UEFA Euro 2020 qualification
2	13 June 2022	Astana Arena, Nur-Sultan, Kazakhstan	Slovakia	1–0	2–1	2022–23 UEFA Nations League C
3	16 June 2023	Stadio Ennio Tardini, Parma, Italy	San Marino	1–0	3–0	UEFA Euro 2024 qualification
4	14 October 2023	Parken Stadium, Copenhagen, Denmark	Denmark	1–3	1–3	UEFA Euro 2024 qualification
5	11 June 2024	Haladás Sportkomplexum, Szombathely, Hungary	Azerbaijan	1–0	2–3	Friendly
6	25 March 2026	Astana Arena, Astana, Kazakhstan	Namibia	1–0	2–0	2026 FIFA Series
7	16 November 2026	Astana Arena, Astana, Kazakhstan	Slovakia	2–1	2–2	2026–27 Nations League C
