= 2011 Kazakhstan Cup =

Tournament details
- Country: Kazakhstan

Final positions
- Champions: Ordabasy
- Runners-up: Tobol

The 2011 Kazakhstan Cup was the 20th season of the Kazakhstan Cup, the annual nationwide football cup competition of Kazakhstan since the independence of the country. The competition began on 12 April 2011 and will end on a yet unknown date. Lokomotiv Astana were the defending champions, having won their first cup in the 2010 competition.

The winner of the competition will qualify for the first qualifying round of the 2012–13 UEFA Europa League.

== Round 1 ==
The draw was conducted on 25 March 2010 at the offices of the Football Federation of Kazakhstan. Entering this round were 28 clubs from both the 2011 Premier League and First Division seasons. Both 2010 cup finalists, Lokomotiv Astana and Shakhter Karagandy, were given a bye to Round 2. The matches took place on 13 April 2011.

Team 1	Score	Team 2
Akzhayik	1–1 (p) 4–3	Aktobe
Ak Bulak	0–1	Taraz
Aktobe-Zhas	1–8	Ordabasy
Ile-Saulet	0–2	Irtysh
Okzhetpes	1–1 (p) 5–4	Zhetysu
Sunkar	2–0	Vostok
Caspiy	0–3	Kaisar
Tsesna	0–5	Kairat
CSKA Almaty	1–1 (p) 3–4	Tobol
Astana	0–2	Atyrau
Bolat	0–0 (p) 2–4	Gefest
Kazakhmys	2–1	Spartak Semey
Kyzylzhar	1–0	Ekibastuz
Tarlan	3–1	Lashyn

== Round 2 ==
Entering this round of the competition were the 14 winners from Round 1 and the two finalists from last year's cup competition, Lokomotiv Astana and Shakhter Karagandy. These matches took place on 20 April 2011.

Team 1	Score	Team 2
Tarlan	0–1	Sunkar
Tobol	3–2 (a.e.t.)	Atyrau
Taraz	4–1	Akzhayik
Kazakhmys	0–3	Shakhter Karagandy
Gefest	0–1	Okzhetpes
Kyzylzhar	2–5	Irtysh
Ordabasy	2–1	Kaisar
Lokomotiv Astana	1–1 (a.e.t.) (p) 2–4	Kairat

== Quarterfinals ==
Entering this round of the competition were the eight winners from Round 2. These matches took place on 11 May 2011.

11 May 2011	Shakhter Karagandy	2 – 4	Taraz	Karaganda
(UTC+6)	Utabayev (yellow card) 4'; Vasiljević 26' (yellow card) 87'; Finonchenko 78'; Ilnur Mangutkin (yellow card) 85'	Report	Pakholyuk 9' (yellow card) 85'; Oleg Nedashkovski 30'; Islamkhan 33'; Diakate (yellow card) 49'; Ramil Nurmukhamedov (yellow card) 55'; Jovanović 60'; Dmitri Yevstigneyev (yellow card) 87'	Stadium: Shakhter Stadium; Attendance: 4,000; Referee: Ruslan Duzmambetov

11 May 2011	Irtysh	2 – 0	Okzhetpes	Pavlodar
(UTC+6)	Konstantin Zarechny 60'; Kuchma 73'	Report	Yury Dyak (yellow card) 44'; Geysar Alekperzade (yellow card) 88'	Stadium: Central Stadium; Attendance: 3,200; Referee: Marat Iskakov

11 May 2011	Sunkar	1 – 3	Ordabasy	Kaskelen
(UTC+6)	Turysbek (yellow card) 51' (goal) 68'; Timur Khalmuratov (yellow card) 63'; Anton Shurygin (yellow card) 70'	Report	Perić 7', 78'; Trajković (yellow card) 26'; Yevstigneyev (yellow card) 28'; Kasyanov 30'	Stadium: Tauelsizdik 10 zhyldygy Attendance: 700; Referee: Abdanbaev

11 May 2011	Tobol	1 – 0	Kairat	Kostanay
19:00 (UTC+6)	Gridin 51'	Report	Đorđević (yellow card) 54'	Stadium: Central Stadium; Attendance: 6,000; Referee: Igor Khisamutdinov

== Semifinals ==
3 November 2011	Irtysh	1 – 1	Tobol	Pavlodar
(UTC+6)	Govedarica 14'; Coulibaly (yellow card) 58'	Report	Kislitsyn (yellow card) 28'; Gridin 45'; Dzholchiyev (yellow card) 47'; Zebelyan (yellow card) 83'	Stadium: Central Stadium; Attendance: 3,000; Referee: Rakhimbayev

8 November 2011	Tobol	3 – 2 (4 – 3 agg.)	Irtysh	Zatobolsk
(UTC+6)	Volkov 22'; Gridin 30'; Bekrić 33'; Yaroslav Baginskiy (yellow card) 89'	Report	Tleshev (yellow card) 36'; Konstantin Zarechny 61'; Zebelyan 81' (o.g.)	Stadium: Zatobolets Stadium; Attendance: 2,500; Referee: Zhukovsky

3 November 2011	Taraz	3 – 1	Ordabasy	Taraz
(UTC+6)	Adamović 57' (pen.), 75' (pen.); Vladimir Yakovlev (yellow card) 18' (yellow-red card) 61'; Jovanović 86'; Oleg Nedashkovski (yellow card) 90+3'	Report	Tazhimbetov 62'	Stadium: Central Stadium; Attendance: 9,000; Referee: Pasko

8 November 2011	Ordabasy	3 – 0 (4 – 3 agg.)	Taraz	Shymkent
(UTC+6)	Ashirbekov 2'; Nurgaliev (yellow card) 5'; Mwesigwa (yellow card) 54'; Tazhimbetov 69'; Bakdaulet Kozhabayev 74'	Report	Kurgulin (yellow card) 88'	Stadium: Kazhymukan Munaitpasov Stadium; Attendance: 1,500; Referee: Khisamutdinov

== Final ==
13 November 2011
14:00 UTC+6

Ordabasy	1 – 0	Tobol
Nurgaliev (yellow card) 36'; Mukhtarov 40'; Yevstigneyev (yellow card) 52'	Report	Dzholchiyev (yellow card) 55'; Šljivić (yellow card) 64' (yellow-red card) 70'; Lotov (yellow card) 87'

Central Stadium, Almaty
Attendance: 8,500
Referee: Ruslan Duzmambetov
