= 2013 Kazakhstan Cup =

Tournament details
- Country: Kazakhstan
- Teams: 30

Final positions
- Champions: Shakhter Karagandy
- Runners-up: Taraz

Tournament statistics
- Matches played: 31
- Goals scored: 88 (2.84 per match)
- Top goal scorer: Sergei Shaff (Taraz) 5

The 2013 Kazakhstan Cup is the 22nd season of the Kazakhstan Cup, the annual nationwide football cup competition of Kazakhstan since the independence of the country. The competition begins on 10 April 2013 and will end with the final in November 2013. Astana are the defending champions, having won their second cup in the 2012 competition.

The winner of the competition will qualify for the first qualifying round of the 2014–15 UEFA Europa League.

== First round ==
The draw was conducted on 2013 at the offices of the Football Federation of Kazakhstan. Entering this round are 30 clubs from both the 2013 Premier League and First Division seasons. The matches took place on 10 April 2013.

Team 1	Score	Team 2
10 April 2013
Bolat	0−0; 4−3 (p)	Atyrau
Maktaaral	0−2	Ordabasy
Lashyn	1−2 (a.e.t.)	Akzhayik
Kyzylzhar	0−3	Taraz
Okzhetpes	0−0; 3−4 (p)	Kairat
Ile-Saulet	1−2	Vostok
Kyran	2−1	Zhetysu
Bayterek	1−9	Aktobe
Astana-64	1−1; 2−4 (p)	Tobol
Spartak Semey	1−2 (a.e.t.)	Kaisar
Sunkar	4−0	Ekibastuz
Ak Bulak	0−1	CSKA Almaty
Caspiy	3−0	Gefest
BIIK	2−3	Shakhter

== Second round ==
Entering this round are the 14 winners from the First Round and the finalists of last year FC Astana and FC Irtysh Pavlodar. The matches took place on 1 May 2013.

Team 1	Score	Team 2
1 May 2013
Ordabasy	5−1	Caspiy
Sunkar	1−1; 4−5 (p)	Akzhayik
Taraz	2−0	Bolat
Tobol	6−2	CSKA Almaty
Kyran	0−1	Aktobe
Astana	4−0	Vostok
Irtysh	2−0	Kaisar
2 May 2013
Shakhter	2−1	Kairat

== Quarter-final ==
Entering this round are the 8 winners from the Second Round. The matches took place on 19 June 2013.

Team 1	Score	Team 2
19 June 2013
Astana	1–2	Shakhter
Irtysh	2–1	Tobol
Taraz	3–0	Akzhayik
Aktobe	3–1 (a.e.t.)	Ordabasy

== Semi-final ==
Entering this round of the competition were the four winners from the quarter-final. The first legs are on 25 September 2013, the return games - on 30 October 2013.

Team 1	Agg.	Team 2	1st leg	2nd leg
Taraz	1–0	Aktobe	0–0	1–0
Irtysh	1–2	Shakhter	1–0	0–2

== Final ==
10 November 2013
16:30 (UTC+6)

Shakhter	1 – 0	Taraz
Khizhnichenko 53'	Report

Astana Arena, Astana
Attendance: 24,500
Referee: Igor Aleshin
