= Konstantin Gorovenko =

Kazakhstani footballer and manager

Personal information
- Full name: Konstantin Aleksandrovich Gorovenko
- Date of birth: 10 January 1977 (age 49)
- Place of birth: Janatas, Kazakh SSR, Soviet Union
- Height: 1.87 m (6 ft 1 1/2 in)
- Position: Defender

Team information
- Current team: Atyrau (manager)

Senior career*
Years	Team	Apps	(Gls)
1995	Kairat	1	(0)
1996	Kainar	30	(1)
1997	Astana	10	(0)
1997–2002	Kairat	87	(5)
2003	Kairat-2	0	(0)
2004	FC Megafon-Kavkaz Nalchik	20	(0)
2005	Alma-Ata	15	(0)
2006	FC Megafon-Kavkaz Nalchik	20	(0)
2007–2008	Megasport	34	(2)
2004	Sunkar	15	(0)

International career
2000–2001	Kazakhstan	6	(3)

Managerial career
- 2020: Shakhter Karagandy
- 2021: Zhetysu
- 2021: Maktaaral
- 2021–2022: Atyrau
- 2022–2023: Maktaaral
- 2023–: Caspiy
- * Club domestic league appearances and goals

Konstantin Aleksandrovich Gorovenko (Russian: Константин Александрович Горовенко; born 10 January 1977) is a Kazakh football coach and a former international player who is the head coach of Caspiy.

== Career ==
=== Managerial ===
On 18 June 2020, Gorovenko was appointed as manager of Shakhter Karagandy.

On 5 January 2021, FC Zhetysu announced the appointment of Gorovenko as their new manager.

== Career statistics ==
=== International ===
Kazakhstan national team
Year	Apps	Goals
2000	2	0
2001	4	3
Total	6	3

Statistics accurate as of match played 25 April 2001

=== International goals ===
Scores and results list Kazakhstan's goal tally first.

#	Date	Venue	Opponent	Score	Result	Competition
1.	14 April 2001	Al-Shaab Stadium, Baghdad, Iraq	Macau	3–0	3–0	2002 WCQ
2.	21 April 2001	Almaty Central Stadium, Almaty, Kazakhstan	Nepal	4–0	4–0	2002 WCQ
3.	23 April 2001	Almaty Central Stadium, Almaty, Kazakhstan	Macau	5–0	5–0	2002 WCQ
