= 2009 Kazakhstan First Division =

Kazakhstan First Division
- Season: 2009
- Promoted: Kairat; Akzhayik Oral
- Relegated: Aizharyk Shymkent; Turkestan

The 2009 Kazakhstan First Division was the 15th edition of Kazakhstan First Division, the second level football competition in Kazakhstan. Unlike the previous years, number of teams were shortened, due to creation of reserve teams league for Premier League teams. Thus, this season 14 teams started to play against each other on home-away system. The best team gains promotion to the Premier League next season while the runner-up will meet with the 11th placed team of the Top tier for the place in the Premier League. League started on May 1 and finished on October 25

== League table ==
Pos	Team	Pld	W	D	L	GF	GA	GD	Pts	Promotion
1	Kairat (C, P)	26	19	4	3	63	21	+42	61	Promotion to the Kazakhstan Premier League
2	Akzhayik Oral (P)	26	16	4	6	46	29	+17	52	Promotion to the Kazakhstan Premier League
3	Namys	26	16	3	7	57	27	+30	51	
4	Sunkar	26	15	6	5	49	23	+26	51	
5	Ile-Saulet	26	12	9	5	53	24	+29	45	
6	Bolat-AMT	26	11	6	9	36	37	−1	39	
7	Spartak Semey	26	12	2	12	35	41	−6	38	
8	Ekibastuz	26	10	5	11	37	43	−6	35	
9	Gefest	26	8	5	13	26	34	−8	29	
10	Caspiy	26	5	8	13	26	40	−14	23	
11	Aktobe-Zhas	26	5	5	16	25	42	−17	20	
12	OSShIOSD (Note: OSShIOSD was penalized with 7 points.)	26	5	11	10	31	56	−25	19	
13	Aizharyk Shymkent (Note: Aizharyk was penalized with 6 points and withdrew from the league.)	26	7	3	16	36	62	−26	18	Withdrew from the league
14	Turkestan (Note: Turkestan was penalized with 9 points and withdrew from the league.)	26	5	1	20	25	66	−41	7	Withdrew from the league

(C) Champions; (P) Promoted
