= 2015 Kazakhstan First Division =

Kazakhstan First Division
- Season: 2015
- Champions: Akzhayik
- Promoted: Akzhayik
- Matches: 156
- Goals: 393 (2.52 per match)
- Top goalscorer: Oleg Khromtsov (FC Akzhayik); Murat Onal (FC Kyran) (14 goals)
- Biggest home win: Akzhayik 8-1 CSKA Almaty
- Biggest away win: Bayterek 0-5 Spartak Semey
- Highest scoring: Akzhayik 8-1 CSKA Almaty

The 2015 Kazakhstan First Division was the 21st edition of Kazakhstan First Division, the second level football competition in Kazakhstan. 13 teams played against each other on home-away system. The top team gains promotion to the Premier League next season, while the second-placed team enters playoff series with the eleventh team of the Premier League.

== Teams ==
=== Stadia and locations ===
Location of teams in 2015 Kazakhstan First Division

=== Foreign players ===
The number of foreign players is restricted to three per team. A team can use all of them on the field in each game.

Club	Player 1	Player 2	Player 3
Akzhayik	(Bulgaria) Yanko Valkanov	(Slovenia) Matic Maruško	-
Baikonur	(Kyrgyzstan) Marsel Islamkulov	-	-
Bayterek	(Turkey) Alihan Ceylan	-	-
Bolat	(Kyrgyzstan) Raul Jalilov	-	-
Caspiy	(Bulgaria) Pavel Stanev	(Ivory Coast) Dramane Koné	-
CSKA Almaty	(Uzbekistan) Pavel Purishkin	-	-
Ekibastuz	(Georgia (country)) Giorgi Abelashvili	(Georgia (country)) Giorgi Narimanidze	(Ukraine) Anton Oganesov
Kyran	(Netherlands) Murat Onal	-	-
Kyzylzhar	(Senegal) Elhadji Ousseynou Ndoye	(Georgia (country)) David Chagelishvili	(Central African Republic) Moussa Limane
Lashyn	-	-	-
Maktaaral	(Serbia) Aleksandar Trajković	(Serbia) Nebojsa Stankovic	(Cameroon) Guy Martin Mitende
Spartak	(Bulgaria) Daniel Peev	-	-
Vostok	(Ukraine) Vyacheslav Kuyanov	-	-

In bold: Players that have been capped for their national team.

Last updated 22 August 2015.

== League table ==
Pos	Team	Pld	W	D	L	GF	GA	GD	Pts	Promotion or qualification
1	Akzhayik (C, P)	24	17	2	5	60	21	+39	53	Promotion to the Kazakhstan Premier League
2	Vostok	24	15	5	4	37	22	+15	50	Qualification for the promotion play-offs
3	Bolat	24	15	3	6	40	23	+17	48	
4	Kyzylzhar	24	14	4	6	41	19	+22	46	
5	Caspiy	24	12	7	5	35	18	+17	43	
6	Spartak Semey	24	11	6	7	34	19	+15	39	
7	Kyran	24	10	6	8	38	28	+10	36	
8	Maktaaral	24	7	11	6	22	17	+5	32	
9	CSKA Almaty	24	8	3	13	29	46	−17	27	
10	Ekibastuz	24	7	5	12	21	31	−10	26	
11	Baikonur	24	6	4	14	19	38	−19	22	
12	Bayterek	24	2	4	18	13	52	−39	10	
13	Lashyn	24	2	0	22	4	59	−55	6	

Source: Soccerway
Rules for classification: 1st points;
Two team tiebreak: 1st overall wins; 2nd head-to-head record; 3rd goals difference; 4th goals scored; 5th away goals scored;
Multiple teams tiebreak: 1st overall wins; 2nd goals difference; 3rd goals scored; 4th away goals scored
(C) Champions; (P) Promoted

== Promotion play-offs ==
14 November 2015	Zhetysu	1–0	Vostok	Astana
(UTC+6)	Shakhmetov 31'	[ Summary]		Stadium: Astana Arena

=== Top scorers ===
Rank	Player	Club	Goals
1	(Moldova) Oleg Hromțov	Akzhayik	14
1	(Netherlands) Murat Önal	Kyran	14
3	(Georgia (country)) David Chagelishvili	Kyzylzhar	10
3	(Kazakhstan) Alexey Maltsev	Akzhayik	10
5	(Slovenia) Matic Maruško	Akzhayik	9
5	(Kazakhstan) Aydar Argimbaev	Vostok	9
5	(Kazakhstan) Vladimir Vyatkin	Vostok	9
8	(Kazakhstan) Maxim Filchakov	Kyran	7
8	(Kazakhstan) Aidos Tattybaev	Bolat	7
