= Ruslan Amirov =

Kyrgyz footballer

Personal information
- Full name: Ruslan Amirov
- Date of birth: 14 October 1990 (age 36)
- Place of birth: Kirghiz SSR, Soviet Union
- Position: Goalkeeper

Team information
- Current team: Turanspor
- Number: 1

Senior career*
Years	Team	Apps	(Gls)
2011	Abdish-Ata Kant		
2012	Lashyn		
2013	Alga Bishkek		
2014	Gefest		
2014–2015	Alga Bishkek		
2015	Turanspor		
2016	Alga Bishkek		
2017	United Victory		

International career^{‡}
2011–2013	Kyrgyzstan	4	(0)
- * Club domestic league appearances and goals as of 6 October 2015 ‡ National team caps and goals as of 1 November 2013

Ruslan Amirov (Tatar: Руслан Әмиров, romanized: Ruslan Ämiref, Russian: Руслан Амиров; born 14 October 1990) is a Kyrgyz professional footballer who plays as a goalkeeper for Turanspor in Bölgesel Amatör Lig, where he plays with his older brother Ildar. He has been a member of the Kyrgyzstan national football team.

== International career ==
Amirov is a member of the Kyrgyzstan national team, since making his debut in 2011.

== Career statistics ==
=== International ===
Kyrgyzstan national team
Year	Apps	Goals
2011	2	0
2013	1	0
Total	3	0

Statistics accurate as of match played 15 October 2013
