= Oleg Lotov =

Kazakhstani footballer

Personal information
- Full name: Oleg Sergeyvich Lotov
- Date of birth: 21 November 1975 (age 50)
- Height: 1.84 m (6 ft 1/2 in)
- Position: Defender

Youth career
- Bolat

Senior career*
Years	Team	Apps	(Gls)
1994–1996	Bolat	49	(1)
1997–1998	Vostok	48	(2)
1999–2001	Zhenis Astana	66	(4)
2001–2002	Shakhter Karagandy	43	(4)
2003–2012	Tobol	183	(9)

International career
1998–2004	Kazakhstan	7	(0)
- * Club domestic league appearances and goals

Oleg Lotov (Russian: Олег Лотов; born 21 November 1975) is a former Kazakhstan international football defender.

== Club career statistics ==
Last update: 8 November 2012

Season	Team	League	Level	Apps	Goals	Cup	Europe
1994	Bolat	Kazakhstan Premier League	1	10	0	-	-
1995	Bolat	Premier League	1	11	0	?(0)	-
1996	Bolat	Premier League	1	28	1	-	-
1997	Vostok	Premier League	1	24	1	?(0)	-
1998	Vostok	Premier League	1	24	1	?(0)	-
1999	Astana	Premier League	1	30	2	?(0)	-
2000	Astana	Premier League	1	26	2	?(1)	-
2001	Astana	Premier League	1	10	0	?(0)	-
2001	Shakhter Karagandy	Premier League	1	14	3	?	-
2002	Shakhter Karagandy	Premier League	1	29	1	6(1)	-
2003	Tobol	Premier League	1	32	1	?(0)	6(0)
2004	Tobol	Premier League	1	30	0	0	-
2005	Tobol	Premier League	1	30	1	2(0)	-
2006	Tobol	Premier League	1	18	0	3(0)	1(0)
2007	Tobol	Premier League	1	8	1	5(1)	3(0)
2008	Tobol	Premier League	1	10	2	4(0)	0
2009	Tobol	Premier League	1	2	1	1(0)	0
2010	Tobol	Premier League	1	31	2	0	1(0)
2011	Tobol	Premier League	1	21	1	5(0)	1(0)
2012	Tobol	Premier League	1	0	0	0	0
Total				388	20	26(3)	11(0)

== International matches ==
#	Date	Venue	Opponent	Result	Competition
1.	1 December 1998	Sisaket Province Central Stadium, Sisaket, Thailand	Iran	0-2	1998 Asian Games
2.	10 December 1998	Rajamangala Stadium, Bangkok, Thailand	Qatar	2-0	1998 Asian Games
3.	12 December 1998	Rajamangala Stadium, Bangkok, Thailand	Lebanon	0-3	1998 Asian Games
4.	24 May 2000	Amman, Jordan	Iran	0-3	Friendly
5.	26 May 2000	Amman, Jordan	Syria	0-4	Friendly
6.	28 May 2000	Amman, Jordan	Palestine	3-2	Friendly
7.	28 April 2004	Central Stadium, Almaty, Kazakhstan	Azerbaijan	2-3	Friendly
Correct as of November 2010

== Honours ==
with Tobol

- Intertoto Cup Winner: 2007
- Kazakhstan League Champion: 2010
- Kazakhstan League Runner-up: 2003, 2005
- Kazakhstan Cup Winner: 2007
- Kazakhstan Cup Runner-up: 2003

with Astana

- Kazakhstan League Champion: 2000
- Kazakhstan Cup Winner: 2000-2001

with Vostok

- Kazakhstan Cup Runner-up: 1996
