= 2013 Kazakhstan First Division =

Kazakhstan First Division
- Season: 2013
- Champions: Kaisar
- Promoted: Kaisar; Spartak Semey
- Matches: 306
- Goals: 800 (2.61 per match)
- Top goalscorer: Zhasulan Moldakaraev (28)

The 2013 Kazakhstan First Division was the 19th edition of Kazakhstan First Division, the second level football competition in Kazakhstan. 18 teams to play against each other on home-away system. The top team gains promotion to the Premier League next season, while the second-placed team enters playoff series with the eleventh team of the Premier League.

== Teams ==
=== Team overview ===
Locations of teams in the 2013 Kazakhstan First Division

Team	Location	Venue	Capacity
Ak Bulak	Talgar	Panfilov Stadium	
Astana-1964	Kazhymukan Munaitpasov Stadium	Astana	12,350
Baikonur	BIIR Stadium	Shymkent	3,000
Bayterek	Astana Arena	Astana	30,000
Bolat	Metallurg Stadium	Temirtau	12,000
Caspiy	Zhastar Stadium	Aktau	3,500
CSKA Almaty	CSKA Stadium	Almaty	4,500
Ekibastuz	Shakhter Stadium	Ekibastuz	6,300
Gefest	Sunkar Stadium	Karaganda	
Ile-Saulet	Central Stadium	Otegen Batyr	2,300
Kaisar	Gani Muratbayev Stadium	Kyzylorda	7,300
Kyran	Lokomotive Stadium	Shymkent	500
Kyzylzhar	Karasai Stadium	Petropavl	12,000
Lashyn	Lashyn Stadium	Taraz	2,500
Maktaaral	Atakent Stadium	Maktaaral District	4,229
Okzhetpes	Okzhetpes Stadium	Kokshetau	4,158
Spartak Semey	Spartak Stadium	Semey	8,000
Sunkar	Tauelsizdik 10 zhyldygy	Kaskelen	2,500

== League table ==
Pos	Team	Pld	W	D	L	GF	GA	GD	Pts	Promotion, qualification or relegation
1	Kaisar (Note: Kaisar were deducted 3 points.) (C, P)	34	23	8	3	77	20	+57	74	Promotion to the Kazakhstan Premier League
2	Spartak Semey (P)	34	21	7	6	54	24	+30	70	Qualification for the promotion play-offs
3	Okzhetpes	34	20	7	7	51	27	+24	67	
4	Kyzylzhar	34	20	5	9	52	35	+17	65	
5	Caspiy	34	19	8	7	55	31	+24	65	
6	Ile-Saulet	34	19	8	7	66	32	+34	65	
7	Astana-1964	34	15	13	6	51	37	+14	58	
8	Kyran	34	16	7	11	53	39	+14	55	
9	Sunkar (Note: Sunkar were deducted 9 points.)	34	16	9	9	48	33	+15	48	
10	Ak Bulak	34	14	6	14	49	39	+10	48	
11	Gefest	34	12	8	14	37	46	−9	44	
12	Ekibastuz	34	9	13	12	34	36	−2	40	
13	Bolat	34	7	9	18	28	42	−14	30	
14	Lashyn	34	5	9	20	28	57	−29	24	
15	Bayterek (Note: Bayterek were deducted 6 points.)	34	8	5	21	32	67	−35	23	
16	Maktaaral (O)	34	5	7	22	29	62	−33	22	Qualification for the relegation play-offs
17	CSKA Almaty (R)	34	5	4	25	29	79	−50	19	Relegation to the Kazakhstan Second Division
18	Baikonur (R)	34	2	7	25	27	94	−67	13	Relegation to the Kazakhstan Second Division

Source: Soccerway
Rules for classification: 1st points;
Two team tiebreak: 1st overall wins; 2nd head-to-head record; 3rd goals difference; 4th goals scored; 5th away goals scored;
Multiple teams tiebreak: 1st overall wins; 2nd goals difference; 3rd goals scored; 4th away goals scored
(C) Champions; (O) Play-off winners; (P) Promoted; (R) Relegated

=== Promotion play-off ===
6 November 2013
19:00 (UTC+6)

Spartak Semey	1–0 (a.e.t.)	Vostok
Puryshkin 118'

Astana Arena, Astana
Attendance: 2,000
Referee: Kuchin

=== Relegation play-off ===
2 November 2013
15:00 (UTC+6)

Maktaaral	3–1	ZSMK Shymkent
Sedko 15', 87'; Holmurzaev 89'		Abdramanov 70'

O. Zharylgapov Sports Complex, Almaty
Attendance: 350
Referee: Rakhimbaev

== Statistics ==
=== Top scorers ===
As of matches played by 25 October 2015

Rank	Player	Club	Goals
1	(Kazakhstan) Zhasulan Moldakaraev	Kaisar	28
2	(Ukraine) Oleksandr Zgura	Kyzylzhar	16
3	(Kazakhstan) Igor Abduscheev	Caspiy	15
4	(Kazakhstan) Constantine Zadorozhnyy	Ak Bulak	14
4	(Kazakhstan) Alibek Buleshev	Okzhetpes	14
6	(Uzbekistan) Pavel Purishkin	Spartak Semey	13
7	(Kazakhstan) Sanat Zhumahanov	Kyran	12
8	(Kazakhstan) Almas Armenia	Caspiy	11
8	(Kazakhstan) Hassan Abdukarimov	Kyran	11
8	(Kazakhstan) Dauren Kusainov	Sunkar	11
