= 2012 Kazakhstan Cup =

Season of the football Kazakhstan Cup

Tournament details
- Country: Kazakhstan
- Teams: 30

Final positions
- Champions: Astana
- Runners-up: Irtysh

The 2012 Kazakhstan Cup is the 21st season of the Kazakhstan Cup, the annual nationwide football cup competition of Kazakhstan since the independence of the country. The competition begins on 16 May 2012 and will end with the final on 11 November 2012. Ordabasy are the defending champions, having won their first cup in the 2011 competition.

The winner of the competition will qualify for the first qualifying round of the 2013–14 UEFA Europa League.

== First round ==
The draw was conducted on 18 April 2012 at the offices of the Football Federation of Kazakhstan. Entering this round are 30 clubs from both the 2012 Premier League and First Division seasons. The matches took place on 15th and 16 May 2012.

Team 1	Score	Team 2
15 May 2012
Kyzylzhar	0−2	Taraz
16 May 2012
Ak-Bulak	2−1	Bolat
CSKA Almaty	5−3	Bayterek
Ile-Saulet	0−3	Okzhetpes
Caspiy	1−3	Akzhayik
Aktobe-Zhas	0−2	Kaisar
BIIK	1−4	Aktobe
Lashyn	2−0	Sunkar
Spartak Semey	0−2	Shakhter Karagandy
Vostok	1−3	Zhetysu
Astana-64	0−1	Astana
Kairat Academy	1−0	Atyrau
Ekibastuz	1−4	Irtysh
Kyran	2−4	Kairat

== Second round ==
Entering this round of the competition were the 14 winners from the First round (Taraz, Ak-Bulak, CSKA Almaty, Okzhetpes, Akzhayik, Kaisar, Aktobe, Lashyn, Shakhter Karagandy, Zhetysu, Astana, Kairat Academy, Irtysh and Kairat) and the two finalists from last year's cup competition, Ordabasy and Tobol. The first legs are on 20 June 2012, the return games - on 27 June 2012.

Team 1	Agg.	Team 2	1st leg	2nd leg
CSKA Almaty	0−7	Shakhter Karagandy	0−4	0−3
Okzhetpes	2−3	Tobol	1−3	1−0
Zhetysu	3−1	Taraz	1−1	2−0
Ak Bulak	1−3	Astana	1−1	0−2
Aktobe	7−0	Lashyn	5−0	2−0
Kairat Academy	1−8	Irtysh	1−4	0−4
Kaisar	2−1	Kairat	2−0	0−1
Akzhayik	1−7	Ordabasy	1−2	0−5

== Quarterfinals ==
Entering this round of the competition were the eight winners from the Second round. The first legs are on 19 September 2012, the return games - on 29 September 2012.

Team 1	Agg.	Team 2	1st leg	2nd leg
Kaisar	2−4	Astana	1−0	1−4
Zhetysu	1−2	Shakhter Karagandy	1−1	0−1
Aktobe	1−0	Ordabasy	0−0	1−0
Irtysh	3−1	Tobol	3−0	0−1

== Semifinals ==
Entering this round of the competition were the four winners from the Quarterfinals. The first legs are on 1 November 2012, the return games - on 5 November 2012.

Team 1	Agg.	Team 2	1st leg	2nd leg
Shakhter Karagandy	2−3	Astana	2−1	0−2
Irtysh	6−3	Aktobe	5−0	1−3

== Final ==
11 November 2012
UTC+6

Astana	2 – 0	Irtysh
Nurdauletov 5'; Nuserbaev 82'

Astana Arena
Attendance: 11,500
Referee: Kairat Slambekov
