= FC CSKA Almaty =

- Full name: Football Club CSKA Almaty
- Founded: 2009; 16 years ago
- Ground: CSKA Stadium
- Capacity: 4,500
- League: Kazakhstan First Division
- 2015: 9th
Home colours	Away colours

FC CSKA Almaty (Kazakh: Сцка Алматы Футбол Клубы, Stska Almaty Fýtbol Klýby) is a Kazakhstani football club based in Almaty.

== History ==
CSKA Almaty was formed in 2009 and made its debut in the 2010 Kazakhstan First Division, finishing 17th.

=== Domestic history ===
Season	Level	Pos	Pld	W	D	L	For	Against	Points	Domestic Cup	Top goalscorer
1992	1st	24	18	2	0	16	15	79	6		
1998	1st	7	26	13	4	9	45	32	43		
1999	1st	12	30	9	4	17	35	52	31		
2000	1st	9	28	12	3	13	39	35	36		
2001	2nd	5									
2002	2nd	7									
2010	2nd	17	34	5	3	26	32	76	18		
2011	2nd	17	32	3	2	27	19	81	11	First round	
2012	2nd	15	30	4	6	20	18	55	18	Second round	
2013	2nd	17	34	5	4	25	29	79	19	Second round	
2014	2nd	12	28	6	6	16	32	54	24	First round	
2015	2nd	9	24	8	3	13	29	46	27	Second round	
