= Vadym Barba =

Ukrainian footballer

Personal information
- Full name: Vadym Yuriyovych Barba
- Date of birth: 7 September 1986 (age 40)
- Place of birth: Ukraine
- Height: 1.80 m (5 ft 11 in)
- Position: Midfielder

Senior career*
Years	Team	Apps	(Gls)
	Palmira	5	(0)
	Zirka	9	(0)
	Bilyaivka	3	(0)
	Podillya	10	(0)
	Oleksandriya	13	(0)
	Bastion	29	(1)
-2013	Kremin	48	(4)
2014	Makhtaaral	24	(5)
2015	Kruoja	5	(1)
2015	→ Kruoja-2 (loan)	1	(0)
2016-2017	Pakruojis		
- * Club domestic league appearances and goals

Vadym Yuriyovych Barba (Russian: Вадим Барба; born 7 September 1986) is a Ukrainian former footballer who is last known to have played as a midfielder for Pakruojis.

== Career ==
Before the 2014 season, Barba signed for Kazakhstani second division side Makhtaaral from Kremin in the Ukrainian third division after almost signing for an Uzbekistani club.

Before the 2015 season, he signed for Kruoja in the Lithuanian top flight before joining Lithuanian second division team Pakruojis.
