= 2010 Kazakhstan Cup =

Tournament details
- Country: Kazakhstan

Final positions
- Champions: Lokomotiv
- Runners-up: Shakhter

The 2010 Kazakhstan Cup was the 19th season of the Kazakhstan Cup, the annual nationwide football cup competition of Kazakhstan since the independence of the country. The competition started on 18 April 2010. Atyrau are the defending champions, having won their first cup last year. The winner of the competition will qualify for second qualifying round of the 2011–12 UEFA Europa League.

== Round 1 ==
The draw was conducted on 2 April 2010 at the offices of the Football Federation of Kazakhstan. Entering this round were 16 clubs from the Kazakhstan First Division and Kazakhstan Second Division. These matches took place on 18 and 19 April 2010.

Team 1	Score	Team 2
Caspiy	3–0	Aktobe-Zhas
Lashyn	2–1	Kaisar
Semey	0–4	Vostok
Sunkar	2–1	Ak-Bulak
Tsesna	4–0	Ile-Saulet
Bolat	2–5	Kazakhmys
Gefest	3–2	Astana-64
Kyzylzhar	3–0	Asbest

== Round 2 ==
The draw for this round was conducted on 2 April 2010 at the offices of the Kazakh Football Federation. The eight winners from Round 1 entered this round of the competition. These matches took place on 24 April 2010.

Team 1	Score	Team 2
Caspiy	0–2	Lashyn
Vostok	1–0	Sunkar
Tsesna	3–3 (aet) (p) 5–4	Kazakhmys
Gefest	3–2 (aet)	Kyzylzhar

== Round 3 ==
Entering this round were the four winners from the previous round and the 12 clubs in the Kazakhstan Premier League. The draw for this round took place on 23 April 2010. These matches took place on 16 May 2010.

Team 1	Score	Team 2
Zhetysu	1–0	Kairat
Atyrau	9–2	Okshetpes
Ordabasy	5–0	Akzhayik
Taraz	1–0	Irtysh
Lashyn	0–2	Aktobe
Tsesna	0–3	Lokomotiv
Vostok	1–2	Tobol
Gefest	0–4	Shakhter

== Quarterfinals ==
Entering this round were the eight winners from Round 3 . The draw for this round took place on 9 June 2010. These matches took place on 26 September 2010.

Team 1	Score	Team 2
Zhetysu	3-0	Atyrau
Lokomotiv	1-0	Taraz
Shakhter	2-1	Aktobe
Tobol	1-4	Ordabasy

== Semifinals ==
The four winners from the previous round competed here. The first legs were played on 18 October 2010 and the second legs were played on 9 November 2010.

Team 1	Agg.	Team 2	1st leg	2nd leg
Zhetysu	0–2	Lokomotiv	0–1	0–1
Shakhter	2–2	Ordabasy	0–1	2–1

== Final ==
14 November 2010
TBA UTC+6

Lokomotiv	1–0	Shakhter

Astana Arena
