= Aleksandr Piskaryov =

Russian football player and manager (born 1949)

Personal information
- Full name: Aleksandr Mikhaiylovich Piskaryov
- Date of birth: 18 November 1949 (age 76)
- Place of birth: Ivanovo, RSFSR, USSR
- Height: 1.76 m (5 ft 9 in)
- Position: Forward

Youth career
- 1966–1967: Tekstilshchik Ivanovo

Senior career*
Years	Team	Apps	(Gls)
1968–1970	Tekstilshchik Ivanovo	109	(33)
1971–1975	Spartak Moscow	117	(33)
1976–1977	SKA Rostov-on-Don	35	(5)
1978	Lokomotiv Kaluga	37	(19)
1979	Spartak Ryazan	36	(18)
1980	Krasnaya Presnya Moscow	3	(1)

International career
1972	Soviet Union U21		

Managerial career
- 1981–1982: Krasnaya Presnya Moscow
- 1984–1991: Soviet Union U17
- 1992–1998: Russia U19/U17
- 1998–1999: Kareda Šiauliai
- 2000: Khimki
- 2000–2001: Dinamo Minsk
- 2002: Mostransgaz Gazoprovod
- 2003: Anzhi Makhachkala (caretaker)
- 2004: Vostok
- 2004: MTZ-RIPO Minsk
- 2005: FBK Kaunas
- 2005–2012: Spartak Moscow (academy coach)
- * Club domestic league appearances and goals

Aleksandr Mikhaiylovich Piskaryov (Russian: Александр Михайлович Пискарёв; born 18 November 1949) is a Russian football player and manager.

== Work history ==
- Krasnaya Presnya Moscow (1980–83)
- Kareda (1998–99)
- FC Khimki Moscow (2000)
- FC Dinamo Minsk (2000–01)
- Mostransgaz Gazoprovod (2000)
- FC Vostok (2004)
- FC Anzhi Makhachkala (2003)
- MTZ-RIPO Minsk (2004)

== Played for ==
- Spartak Moscow (1971–75)
- FC SKA Rostov-on-Don (1976–77)
- Lokomotiv Kaluga (1978)
- Spartak Ryazan (1979)
- Krasnaya Presnya Moscow (1980)
