= Sergey Kvochkin =

Soviet Kazakhstani footballer

Personal information
- Full name: Sergey Prokofyevich Kvochkin
- Date of birth: October 6, 1938
- Place of birth: Almaty, Kazakh SSR
- Date of death: December 29, 2007 (age 69)
- Place of death: Almaty, Kazakhstan
- Height: 1.78 m (5 ft 10 in)
- Position: Striker

Senior career*
Years	Team	Apps	(Gls)
1960–1969	FC Kairat	232	(62)
1970–1971	FC Vostok	?	(14)

Managerial career
- 1972–1973: FC Vostok (assistant)
- 1973–1975: FC Vostok
- 1976–1978: FC Vostok
- 1979: FC Okzhetpes
- 1980–1983: FC Ekibastuzetc
- 1984–1986: FC Vostok
- * Club domestic league appearances and goals

Sergey Prokofyevich Kvochkin (October 6, 1938 – December 29, 2007) was a Soviet Kazakhstani footballer who played as a forward. In 2004, he was selected as the best Kazakhstani footballer in the UEFA Jubilee Awards.
