= Pavel Stanev =

Bulgarian footballer

Personal information
- Full name: Pavel Kolev Stanev
- Date of birth: 27 October 1986 (age 40)
- Place of birth: Plovdiv, Bulgaria
- Height: 1.80 m (5 ft 11 in)
- Position: Goalkeeper

Team information
- Current team: Kariana Erden
- Number: 1

Youth career
- Botev Plovdiv

Senior career*
Years	Team	Apps	(Gls)
2004–2008	Botev Plovdiv	31	(0)
2008	→ Montana (loan)	15	(0)
2009–2010	Vihren Sandanski	13	(0)
2010–2011	Nesebar	24	(0)
2011	Botev Vratsa	3	(0)
2012	Neftochimic 1986	8	(0)
2012–2015	Caspiy	64	(0)
2016–	Kariana Erden	98	(0)
- * Club domestic league appearances and goals as of 1 June 2020

Pavel Stanev (Bulgarian: Павел Станев; born 27 October 1986) is a Bulgarian football goalkeeper who last played for Kariana Erden before retiring on 1 July 2022.

== Career ==
Born in Plovdiv Stanev was raised in Botev Plovdiv's youth teams. In June 2004 he signed first professional contract with The Canaries. Stanev made his official debut for Botev in the Bulgarian A PFG in a match against Slavia Sofia on 25 September 2005. He substituted Lilcho Arsov in half time and played for 45 minutes. The result of the match was a 0:0. For three years in Botev the goalkeeper played in only 18 matches and in January 2008 was loaned out for six months to Montana (team from the Bulgarian second division).

For Montana Stanev played very good in 15 matches and in June 2008 returned to Botev. In January 2009 he signed with FC Vihren Sandanski.
