= FC Lashyn =

Kazakh football club

- Full name: Football Club Lashyn Taraz
- Founded: 2007; 18 years ago
- Ground: Lashyn Stadium
- Capacity: 2,500
- League: Kazakhstan First Division
- 2015: 13th
Home colours	Away colours

FC Lashyn (Kazakh: Лашын Тараз Футбол Клубы, Lashyn Taraz Fýtbol Klýby) is a Kazakhstani football club based in Taraz.

== History ==
The club was formed in 2007 and finished 8th in its first season in Kazakhstan First Division.

=== Domestic history ===
Season	Level	Pos	Pld	W	D	L	For	Against	Points	Domestic Cup	Top goalscorer
2010	2nd	11	34	12	8	14	46	54	44	Third round	
2011	2nd	13	32	8	10	14	31	39	34	First round	(Kazakhstan) Erkasym Eshenkul – 11
2012	2nd	10	30	11	8	11	33	28	41	Second round	(Kazakhstan) Erkasym Eshenkul – 8
2013	2nd	14	34	5	9	20	28	57	24	First round	
2014	2nd	11	28	7	6	15	23	42	27	Second round	
2015	2nd	13	24	2	0	22	4	59	6	Preliminary round	
