= FC Caspiy =

Association football club in Kazakhstan

Caspiy
- Full name: Caspiy Football Club
- Nickname: Sailors
- Founded: 1962; 64 years ago, as Trud
- Ground: Zhastar Stadium
- Capacity: 5,000
- Chairman: Nurtas Kurgulin
- Manager: Piraliy Aliev
- League: Kazakhstan Premier League
- 2025: ▲1st in First League (II), promotion
- Website: caspiyfc.kz
Home colours	Away colours

Caspiy Football Club (Kazakh: Футбольный клуб «Каспий») is a Kazakhstani football club based at the Zhastar Stadium in Aktau. The club name derived from Caspian Sea (Kazakh: Каспий теңізі), on whose eastern shore Aktau is located. Their best year was 1996, when they finished 4th in the Premier League and reached the semi-finals of the Kazakhstan Cup. Since 2001, they were stuck in the First Division, until gaining direct promotion to the top division in the 2019 season.

== History ==
From 1979 – 1991, the team played in the Soviet second league. From 1992 onwards, following the breakup of the Soviet Union, they played in the championship of Kazakhstan. The best achievement – the 4th place in 1996.

=== Premier league return ===
Caspiy returned to the Kazakhstan Premier League for the first time in 19 seasons in 2020, with head coach Srdjan Blagojevic guiding them to a 10th-place finish. The following season, 2021, Blagojevic sealed an 8th-place finish before leaving to join Astana, with Nikolay Kostov being appointed as his replacement on 31 December 2021. On April 17, 2023, a Macedonian specialist, Igor Angelovski, was announced as the new head coach.

In 2021, the club rebranded itself, changing the logo, primary club colors, and sports kit.

The top scorer in the club's history, with more than 60 goals (as of April 19, 2022), is the forward, and club alumnus Almas Nurbergenovich Armenov.

=== Names ===
- 1962 : Founded as Trud
- 1990 : The club is renamed Aktau
- 1993 (July) : The club is renamed Munaishy
- 1999 : The club is renamed Aktau
- 2000 : The club is renamed Mangystau
- 2002 : The club is renamed Caspiy

=== Domestic history ===
Season	League									Kazakhstan Cup	Top goalscorer		Manager
Season	Div.	Pos.	P	W	D	L	F	A	Pts	Kazakhstan Cup	Name	League	Manager
1992	1st	15	32	17	3	12	62	46	54	First round	(Kazakhstan) Eduard Glazunov	19	(Kazakhstan) Degtyarov Alexander
1993	1st	20	48	23	5	20	84	77	74	First round	(Kazakhstan) Erkin Sultanov	20	
1994	2nd	1	36	30	2	4	62	23	92	Semi-final			
1995	1st	16	30	1	5	24	15	107	8	Last 16			
1996	1st	4	34	18	9	7	54	26	63	Semi-final	(Kazakhstan) Eduard Glazunov	10	
1997	Non League												
1998	2nd	3	4	1	1	2	2	7	4				
1999	2nd	8	3	0	0	3	2	9	0				
2000	2nd	2	11	6	3	2	20	9	21				
2001	1st	17	32	3	6	23	16	59	15	Last 16	(Kazakhstan) Erlan Urazaev	5	(Kazakhstan) Vladimir Fomichev
2002	2nd	6	24	8	6	10	25	28	30	Quarter-final			
2003	2nd (SW)	3	20	12	1	7	33	21	37	First round			
2004	2nd (SW)	3	24	17	2	5	50	17	53	First round			
2005	2nd (SW)	5	22	10	6	6	31	17	36	First round	(Kazakhstan) Fedor Siminidi	15	
2006	2nd (SW)	2	26	19	3	4	63	20	60	First round	(Kazakhstan) Talgat Sabalakov	14	
2007	2nd (SW)	3	26	19	3	4	46	23	43	First round	(Kazakhstan) Sergey Gridin	13	
2008	2nd	9	26	11	1	14	42	55	34	First round			
2009	2nd	10	26	5	8	13	26	40	23	First round			(Kazakhstan) Anvarbek Sanbaev
2010	2nd	16	34	5	5	24	40	79	20	Second round	(Kazakhstan) Erlan Murlikhanov	6	(Kazakhstan) Mels Kushanov
2011	2nd	12	32	10	7	15	33	42	37	First round	(Kazakhstan) Almas Armenov	9	(Kazakhstan) Baurzhan Baimukhammedov
2012	2nd	8	30	11	7	12	39	31	40	First round	(Kazakhstan) Almas Armenov	8	(Bulgaria) Radostin Dimov
2013	2nd	5	34	19	8	7	54	31	65	Second round	(Kazakhstan) Igor Abdusheev	15	(Kazakhstan) Igor Prokhnitskiy
2014	2nd	4	28	17	4	7	44	26	51	First round	(Kazakhstan) Almas Armenov	13	(Kazakhstan) Igor Prokhnitskiy
2015	2nd	5	24	12	7	5	35	18	43	First round	(Kazakhstan) Vladimir Vyatkin	9	(Kazakhstan) Kairat Aimanov
2016	2nd	4	28	12	7	9	38	29	43	Second round	(Kazakhstan) Almas Armenov	7	(Kazakhstan) Kairat Aimanov / Askar Kushikbaev
2017	2nd	8	24	3	6	15	14	36	15	First round	(Central African Republic) Moussa Limane	7	(Kazakhstan) Askar Kushikbaev
2018	2nd	11	33	3	7	23	25	65	16	First round	(Croatia) Branko Čubrilo	5	(Kazakhstan) Askar Keldjanov / (Croatia) Ivan Pudar
2019	2nd	2	26	17	5	4	48	21	56	Last 16	(Kazakhstan) Aidos Tattybaev	19	(Montenegro) Sava Kovačević
2020	1st	10	20	5	2	13	15	34	17	-	(France) Billal Sebaihi	4	(Serbia) Srdjan Blagojevic
2021	1st	8	26	8	8	10	35	35	32	Quarterfinal	(Russia) David Karayev	6	(Serbia) Srdjan Blagojevic
2022	1st	9	26	9	4	13	26	42	31	Group Stage	(Brazil) Ruan Teles	6	(Bulgaria) Nikolay Kostov
2023	1st	13	26	4	8	14	28	44	20	Round of 16	(Georgia (country)) Giorgi Pantsulaia	6	(Georgia (country)) Kakhaber Tskhadadze / (North Macedonia) Igor Angelovski / (Kazakhstan) Konstantin Gorovenko
2024	2nd	3	28	18	4	6	63	29	58	Group Stage	(Kazakhstan) Bagdaulet Konlimkos	8	(Kazakhstan) Konstantin Gorovenko/ (Kazakhstan) Kuanysh Kabdulov
2025	2nd	1	26	22	2	2	74	27	68	Round of 16	(Kazakhstan) Miras Turlybek	23	(Kazakhstan) Esatov Ruslan

== Current squad ==
As of 18 October, 2026

Note: Flags indicate national team as defined under FIFA eligibility rules; some limited exceptions apply. Players may hold more than one non-FIFA nationality.

No.	Pos.	Nation	Player
1	GK	KAZ	Nurlybek Ayazbaev
4	DF	KAZ	Erlan Kadyrbaev
7	MF	KAZ	Bekzat Kabylan
8	MF	KAZ	Vyacheslav Raskatov
9	FW	KAZ	Ramazan Abylaykhan
10	FW	RUS	Idris Umayev
11	FW	FRA	Noha Ndombasi
13	MF	KAZ	Meyrambek Serikbay
14	DF	POR	André Amaral
15	MF	GHA	David Epton
16	MF	KAZ	Ayan Baydavletov (on loan from Aktobe)
17	MF	BLR	Vladislav Klimovich
18	MF	UKR	Max Kucheriavyi
19	DF	KAZ	Maksat Taykenov
21	DF	KAZ	Dierzhon Aripov

No.	Pos.	Nation	Player
23	DF	KAZ	Amandyk Nabikhanov
24	GK	KAZ	Dinmukhammed Zhomart
26	MF	BLR	Pavel Sedko
27	MF	KAZ	David Esimbekov
28	DF	KAZ	Timur Kurbanov
29	DF	KAZ	Anuar Bekmyrza
30	DF	POR	Bernardo Morgado
47	MF	KAZ	Daniyar Usenov
49	GK	ESP	Yan Andrin
50	FW	KAZ	Magzum Zholaman
55	DF	KAZ	Nuralys Elemes
60	GK	KAZ	Beybarys Kaldybay
67	MF	KAZ	Meyrambek Kalmyrza
69	DF	KAZ	Mukhammed Kuanysh
93	FW	FRA	Keba Sylla

== Honours ==
- Kazakhstan First Division (2): 1994, 2025
- Kazakh SSR Top League (1): 1978
- Kazakh SSR Cup (3): 1964, 1977, 1978
