= FC Maktaaral =

Kazakh association football club

- Full name: Football Club Maktaaral; Мақтаарал футбол клубы
- Founded: 2011; 15 years ago
- Ground: Alpamys Batyr Stadium
- Capacity: 4,229
- Chairman: Serikbai Utegenov
- League: Ekinsi Lïgaşı (III)
- 2025: 8th, Conference North-East
- Website: https://fcmaqtaaral.kz/
| Home colours | Away colours | Third colours |

FC Maktaaral (Kazakh: Мақтаарал футбол клубы) is a Kazakh professional football club based in Maktaaral District.

== History ==
The club was formed in 2012 and played in Second League. Won and was promoted to First League and finished 16th in its first season in the Kazakhstan First Division.

In 2021 was second in First League and promoted to Premier League.

=== Domestic history ===
| Champions | Runners-up | Third place | Promoted | Relegated |

| Season | Tier | Pos | Pld | W | D | L | For | Against | Points | Domestic Cup | Top goalscorer |
|---|---|---|---|---|---|---|---|---|---|---|---|
| 2013 | 2 | 16th | 34 | 5 | 7 | 22 | 29 | 62 | 22 | First round | Ernes Sed'ko (8) |
| 2014 | 2 | 15th | 28 | 4 | 5 | 19 | 33 | 62 | 17 | First round | Vadim Barba (5) |
| 2015 | 2 | 8th | 24 | 7 | 11 | 6 | 22 | 17 | 32 | Preliminary round | Askar Abutov (4); Alimkhan Tazhmagambetov (4) |
| 2016 | 2 | 5th | 28 | 11 | 8 | 9 | 31 | 31 | 41 | Group stage | Askar Abutov (8) |
| 2017 | 2 | 4th | 24 | 9 | 8 | 7 | 30 | 26 | 35 | Preliminary round | Yedige Oralbai (6) |
| 2018 | 2 | 7th | 33 | 14 | 6 | 13 | 41 | 41 | 48 | Quarterfinal | Roman Pavinich (9); Askar Abutov (9) |
| 2019 | 2 | 6th | 26 | 13 | 2 | 11 | 37 | 34 | 41 | Group stage | Ryskul Beknur (10) |
| 2020 | 2 | 4th | 12 | 5 | 2 | 5 | 15 | 16 | 17 | Not Held | Vyacheslav Serdyukov (5) |
| 2021 | 2 | 2nd | 22 | 14 | 4 | 4 | 37 | 15 | 46 | Group stage | Vyacheslav Serdyukov (7) |
| 2022 | 1 | 8th | 26 | 8 | 7 | 11 | 28 | 38 | 31 | Quarterfinal | Ramazan Karimov (7) |

== Squad ==
As of 26 June 2024

Note: Flags indicate national team as defined under FIFA eligibility rules; some limited exceptions apply. Players may hold more than one non-FIFA nationality.

| No. | Pos. | Nation | Player |
|---|---|---|---|
| 1 | GK | KAZ | Aleksey Povyshev |
| 3 | DF | KAZ | Danier Kanapiev |
| 4 | DF | KAZ | Oral Orynbasar |
| 5 | DF | KAZ | Kanat Ashirbay |
| 7 | DF | KAZ | Sultanbek Duyseshov |
| 8 | MF | KAZ | Bakhtiyar Elbaev |
| 9 | MF | KAZ | Adylzhan Musaev |
| 10 | FW | KAZ | Nurzhan Dandybaev |
| 11 | MF | KAZ | Ramazan Ali-Ogly |
| 14 | MF | KAZ | Meyrambek Serikbay |
| 15 | MF | KAZ | Kazhymukan Kuatbekuly |

| No. | Pos. | Nation | Player |
|---|---|---|---|
| 17 | DF | KAZ | Maksat Imanali |
| 21 | DF | KAZ | Dierjon Aripov |
| 23 | MF | KAZ | Shadman Bakirov |
| 24 | DF | KAZ | Yuriy Akhanov |
| 28 | MF | KAZ | Myrzabek Asan |
| 32 | DF | KAZ | Bakhytzhan Davylatov |
| 43 | DF | KAZ | Rauan Shintemirov |
| 51 | GK | KAZ | Syryn Daulenov |
| 71 | DF | KAZ | Samat Mazhit |
| 73 | MF | KAZ | Nurdaulet Serik |
| 75 | MF | KAZ | Mustafa Reyizov |

== Managerial history ==
| Manager | Period | Record | | | | | | |
| Manager | Period | G | W | D | L | GF | GA | Win % |
|---|---|---|---|---|---|---|---|---|
| Rauf Inileev | 21 January 2014 – 30 June 2014 | 12 | 2 | 1 | 9 | 15 | 27 | 16.67 |
