= Rauan Sariyev =

Kazakhstani footballer

Personal information
- Full name: Rauan Erlanovich Sariye
- Date of birth: 22 January 1994 (age 32)
- Place of birth: Kazakhstan
- Positions: Midfielder; forward

Youth career
- Olé Brasil
- Atlético-MG

Senior career*
Years	Team	Apps	(Gls)
2013	Kairat	7	(0)
2014	Zhetysu	25	(3)
2015	Ordabasy	11	(0)
2019	Zhetysu II	2	(0)
- * Club domestic league appearances and goals

Rauan Erlanovich Sariyev (Russian: Рауан Ерланович Сариев; born 22 January 1994) is a Kazakhstani footballer who is last known to have played as a midfielder or attacker for Zhetysu II. Besides Kazakhstan, he has played in Brazil.

== Career ==
In 2009, Sariyev joined the youth academy of Brazilian fourth tier side Olé Brasil. In 2011, he joined the youth academy of Atlético-MG in the Brazilian top flight, Before the 2013 season, Sariev signed for Kazakhstani top flight club Kairat, where he made 7 league appearances and scored 0 goals. On 30 March 2013, he debuted for Kairat during a 0–0 draw with Atyrau. After that, he signed for Zhetysu II in the Kazakhstani second tier.
