= FC Sunkar =

Association football club

- Full name: Football Club Sunkar; Сұнқар Футбол Клубы
- Founded: 2004; 22 years ago
- Dissolved: January 2015, 25; 11 years ago
- Ground: Tauelsizdik 10 zhyldygy
- Capacity: 2,500
- Manager: Askar Kozhabergenov
- League: Kazakhstan First Division
- 2014: 8th
Home colours	Away colours

FC Sunkar (Kazakh: Сұнқар Футбол Клубы) was a Kazakhstani football club based in Kaskelen.

== History ==
The club was formed in 2004 as Karasai Sarbazdary, before changing its name to Sunkar in 2009. In January 2015, Sunkar folded.

=== Domestic history ===
Season	League									Kazakhstan Cup	Top goalscorer		Manager
Season	Div.	Pos.	Pl.	W	D	L	GS	GA	P	Kazakhstan Cup	Name	League	Manager
2007	2nd	5th	26	12	3	11	47	39	39				
2008	2nd	12th	26	6	6	14	27	38	24				(Kazakhstan) Sergei Volgin
2009	2nd	4th	26	15	6	5	49	23	51		(Kazakhstan) Rustem Kaliev	8	
2010	2nd	3rd	34	22	7	5	73	28	73	Second round	(Kazakhstan) Dauren Kussainov	27	(Kazakhstan) Askar Kozhabergenov
2011	2nd	1st	32	23	5	4	62	19	77	Quarter-final	(Kazakhstan) Alibek Buleshev	21	(Kazakhstan) Askar Kozhabergenov
2012	1st	13th	26	5	8	13	16	31	23	First round	(Bosnia and Herzegovina) Rade Đokić	3	(Kazakhstan) Vladimir Gulyaimkhadarov
2013	2nd	9th	34	16	9	9	48	33	48	Second round	(Kazakhstan) Dauren Kusainov	11	(Kazakhstan) Vladimir Gulyaimkhadarov
2014	2nd	8th	28	11	7	10	42	39	40	First round	(Kazakhstan) Konstantin Zadorozhniy	23	

== Honours ==
- Kazakhstan First Division (1): 2011
