= FC Vostok =

Kazakh football club

- Full name: Football Club Vostok Öskemen; Восток Өскемен Футбол Клубы
- Founded: 1963; 63 years ago
- Dissolved: 2016; 10 years ago
- Ground: Vostok Stadium, Öskemen
- Capacity: 12,000
- Chairman: Kurmagaliev Talgat
- League: Kazakhstan First Division
- 2015: 2nd
Home colours	Away colours

FC Vostok (Kazakh: Восток Футбол Клубы, Vostok Fýtbol Klýby) was a Kazakh football club from Öskemen (Ust-Kamenogorsk), and a founding member of the Kazakhstan Premier League in 1992. The club's best finish in the league was 5th place in 1997 and again in 1998.

== History ==
On 19 September 2008, FC Shakhter and FC Vostok were found guilty of one count of match fixing. Coaches and management involved were banned from football for five years and both clubs were expelled from the Kazakhstan Premier League. On 2 October 2008, the Football Federation of Kazakhstan revised these decisions. FC Vostok's expulsion was upheld, while FC Shakhter's punishment was reduced to a deduction of nine points. The result of the fixed match was annulled, and all remaining Vostok games were to be counted as won 3–0 by their opponents. However, the expulsion of FC Vostok from the Kazakhstan Cup 2008 was revoked.

A new club, FC Altai Semey, was founded in January 2016 from the merger of FC Vostok and Spartak Semey.

=== Names ===
- 1963 : Founded as Vostok
- 1997 : Renamed Vostok Adil
- 1998 : Renamed Vostok
- 1999 : Renamed Vostok Altyn
- 2003 : Renamed Vostok

=== Domestic history ===
Season	League									Kazakhstan Cup	Top goalscorer		Manager
Season	Div.	Pos.	Pl.	W	D	L	GS	GA	P	Kazakhstan Cup	Name	League	Manager
1992	1st	11	26	8	4	14	29	35	20		(Kazakhstan) Ruslan Duzmambetov	15	
1993	1st	10	22	7	2	13	26	40	16				
1994	1st	13	30	8	6	16	39	58	22	Winner			
1995	1st	8	30	13	3	14	40	41	42	Runners-up	(Kazakhstan) Ruslan Duzmambetov	14	
1996	1st	12	34	12	8	14	34	35	44				
1997	1st	5	26	14	8	4	42	16	50		(Kazakhstan) Ruslan Duzmambetov	10	
1998	1st	5	26	17	1	8	49	25	52	Runners-up			
1999	1st	7	30	14	4	12	32	33	46				
2000	1st	11	28	8	4	16	30	45	28				
2001	1st	9	32	13	5	14	42	43	44				
2002	1st	11	32	10	2	20	27	47	32				(Kazakhstan) Vakhid Masudov
2003	1st	14	32	8	8	16	34	46	32		(Kazakhstan) Pavel Udalov	10	
2004	1st	12	36	11	7	18	42	54	40				(Russia) Aleksandr Piskaryov
2005	1st	14	30	9	1	20	24	49	28		(Kazakhstan) Aleksey Shakin	9	
2006	1st	9	30	9	8	13	33	40	35				
2007	1st	7	30	12	5	13	30	38	41				
2008	1st	16	29	10	5	14	35	48	35	Semi-final			
2009	1st	10	26	7	5	14	32	56	23	Quarter-final			(Kazakhstan) Andrei Miroshnichenko
2010	2nd	1	34	27	6	1	91	15	87	Third round			
2011	1st	12	32	5	11	16	23	47	17	First round	(Kazakhstan) Stanislav Lunin (Ukraine) Oleksandr Zgura	3	
2012	2nd	2	30	16	9	5	40	21	57	First round			(Kazakhstan) Pavel Saliy
2013	1st	11	32	6	13	13	20	37	20	Second round	(Kazakhstan) Sergey Kostyuk (Senegal) Papa Niang	5	(Kazakhstan) Vladimir Fomichyov
2014	2nd	6	28	14	5	9	48	31	47	Second round			(Kazakhstan) Vladimir Fomichyov
2015	2nd	2	24	15	5	4	37	22	50	First round	(Kazakhstan) Aydar Argimbaev (Kazakhstan) Vladimir Vyatkin	5	(Kazakhstan) Vladimir Fomichyov

=== Continental history ===
Season	Competition	Round	Club	Home	Away	Aggregate
1995	Asian Cup Winners' Cup	First round	(Kyrgyzstan) Ak-Maral Tokmok	w/o		
1995	Asian Cup Winners' Cup	Second round	(Iran) Bahman	2–2	0–1	2–3

== Honours ==
- Kazakhstan First Division
  - Champions (1): 2010
- Kazakhstan Cup
  - Winners (1): 1994

== Current squad ==
Note: Flags indicate national team as defined under FIFA eligibility rules; some limited exceptions apply. Players may hold more than one non-FIFA nationality.

No.	Pos.	Nation	Player
1	GK	KAZ	Andrey Andreev
2	DF	UKR	Vyacheslav Kuyanov
3	DF	KAZ	Maksat Akhanov
4	DF	KAZ	Temirlan Erlanov
5	DF	KAZ	Ivan Shevchenko
6	MF	KAZ	Aleksey Shakin
8	DF	KAZ	Anton Moltussinov
9	FW	KAZ	Aydar Argimbayev
10	FW	KAZ	Pavel Udalov
11	MF	KAZ	Sabyrkhan Ibraev
13	FW	KAZ	Aleksey Shapurin

No.	Pos.	Nation	Player
14	MF	KAZ	Aslan Dzhanuzakov
15	DF	KAZ	Dmitri Schmidt
17	MF	KAZ	Evgeni Schmidt
19	MF	KAZ	Vyacheslav Erbes
20	MF	KAZ	Denis Zhuravel
22	FW	KAZ	Aleksandr Bogdanov
23	MF	KAZ	Almas Sapargaliyev
25	GK	KAZ	Vitali Miller
27	DF	KAZ	Andrey Shabaev
28	GK	KAZ	Vladimir Niklevich

== Previous managers ==
- (Kazakhstan) Sergey Kvochkin (1973–75), (1976–78), (1984–86)
- (Kazakhstan) Vakhid Masudov (2002)
- (Russia) Aleksandr Piskaryov (2004)
- (Kazakhstan) Andrei Miroshnichenko (2009)
- (Kazakhstan) Pavel Saliy (2012)
- (Kazakhstan) Vladimir Fomichyov (Jan 2013)
- (Kazakhstan) Pavel Yevteyev (2014–2015)
