= FC Kyran =

Kazakh football club

- Full name: Kyran Football Club
- Ground: Lokomotive Stadium
- Capacity: 500
- Manager: Bolat Esmagambetov
- League: Kazakhstan First Division
- 2023: 5th
Home colours	Away colours

FC Kyran (Kazakh: Қыран Футбол Клубы, Qyran fýtbol klýby) is a Kazakhstani football club based in Shymkent.

== History ==
The club was formed in 2011 and finished 11th in its first season in the Kazakhstan First Division.

== League and cup history ==
Season	Level	Pos	Pld	W	D	L	For	Against	Points	Domestic Cup	Top goalscorer
2011	2nd	11	32	11	10	11	38	34	43		
2012	2nd	5	30	14	6	10	51	38	48	First round	
2013	2nd	8	34	16	7	11	53	39	55	Second round	
2014	2nd	2	28	19	3	6	60	30	60	Second round	
2015	2nd	7	24	10	6	8	38	28	36	Preliminary round	(Netherlands) Murat Önal – 14

== Current squad ==
As of 31 May 2023

Note: Flags indicate national team as defined under FIFA eligibility rules; some limited exceptions apply. Players may hold more than one non-FIFA nationality.

No.	Pos.	Nation	Player
2	DF	(Kazakhstan) KAZ	Elzhas Sarbay
3	DF	(Kazakhstan) KAZ	Asadbek Abdikhamitov
4	DF	(Russia) RUS	Aleksey Kostyuk
5	DF	(Kazakhstan) KAZ	Azamat Amanbay
6	MF	(Kazakhstan) KAZ	Sharafutdin Isaev
7	MF	(Uzbekistan) UZB	Alibobo Rakhmatullaev
8	DF	(Kazakhstan) KAZ	Serikzhan Abzhal
9	MF	(Kazakhstan) KAZ	Aybek Oksikbaev
10	MF	(Kazakhstan) KAZ	Danabek Kuanishbay
11	FW	(Kazakhstan) KAZ	Edige Oralbay
12	FW	(Kazakhstan) KAZ	Sanzhar Abduvaitov
13	MF	(Kazakhstan) KAZ	Altynbek Tuleev

No.	Pos.	Nation	Player
14	FW	(Kazakhstan) KAZ	Abylaykhan Makhambetov
15	FW	(Morocco) MAR	Mohamed Hamza Hajjar
17	FW	(Kazakhstan) KAZ	Azamat Baybosyn
20	MF	(Kazakhstan) KAZ	Samat Esenov
21	DF	(Kazakhstan) KAZ	Askat Ermekuulu
22	FW	(Kazakhstan) KAZ	Zhasulan Erzhigit
23	MF	(Kazakhstan) KAZ	Erbolat Bakhadyrov
27	FW	(Kazakhstan) KAZ	Bekzat Zhaksybayuly
29	GK	(Kazakhstan) KAZ	Damir Bayshylykov
70	FW	(Kazakhstan) KAZ	Alikhan Uvaliev
87	DF	(Kazakhstan) KAZ	Islam Umarov
88	DF	(Uzbekistan) UZB	Saidjon Topilov
