= FC Ekibastuz =

Kazakhstani football club

- Full name: Football Club Ekibastuz; Екібастұз футбол клубы
- Founded: 2003; 23 years ago
- Ground: Shakhter, Ekibastuz
- Capacity: 6,300
- Chairman: Rais Gainullin
- Manager: Vitaliy Sparyshev
- League: Kazakhstan First Division
- 2025: 10th
- Website: https://fcekibastuz.kz/
Home colours	Away colours

FC Ekibastuz (Kazakh: Екібастұз футбол клубы) is a Kazakh professional football club based in Ekibastuz. Until 2008, the team represented Pavlodar and was called Energetik Pavlodar. In 2008, the team played as Energetik-2 Ekibastuz. In 2009, it was renamed to Ekibastuz FK. They are current members of the Kazakhstan First Division.

== History ==
=== Names ===
- 2003 : Founded as Energetik
- 2008 : Renamed Energetik-2
- 2009 : Renamed Ekibastuz

=== Domestic history ===
Season	Level	Pos	Pld	W	D	L	For	Against	Points	Domestic Cup	Top goalscorer
2004	2nd	4	24	13	4	7	43	23	43		(Kazakhstan) Vasiliy Prosekov – 16
2005	2nd	1	24	21	3	0	109	7	66		(Kazakhstan) Vasiliy Prosekov – 34
2006	1st	16	30	6	8	16	28	44	26		
2007	2nd	1	26	24	0	2	62	10	72		
2008	1st	14	30	5	8	17	21	43	23		
2009	2nd	8	26	10	5	11	37	43	35		
2010	2nd	11	34	14	9	11	44	37	51		
2011	2nd	5	32	15	7	10	47	34	52	First round	
2012	2nd	12	30	11	4	15	45	43	37	First round	
2013	2nd	12	34	9	13	12	34	36	40	First round	
2014	2nd	7	28	11	8	9	40	35	41	First round	
2015	2nd	10	24	7	5	12	21	31	26	Second round	(Kazakhstan) Azamat Aubakirov – 8

== Current squad ==
As of 10 August 2026

Note: Flags indicate national team as defined under FIFA eligibility rules; some limited exceptions apply. Players may hold more than one non-FIFA nationality.

No.	Pos.	Nation	Player
1	GK	KAZ	Stanislav Samoylov
3	DF	KAZ	Kuandyk Ermekov
4	DF	KAZ	Erasyl Temershi
6	MF	KAZ	Magzhan Baurzhan
7	FW	KAZ	Alibi Mukhit
8	MF	KAZ	Farkhat Abaev (captain)
10	MF	KAZ	Anatoliy Krasotin
11	MF	KAZ	Ansar Altynkhan
13	FW	KAZ	Dias Iskakov
15	FW	KAZ	Ramazan Oral
16	GK	KAZ	Stanislav Kuryan
17	DF	KAZ	Ayan Kulmaganbetov

No.	Pos.	Nation	Player
18	MF	KAZ	Ilya Demin
19	MF	KAZ	Ilya Lunev
20	MF	KAZ	Azamat Kalymbetov
21	MF	KAZ	Nazar Al-Khadzh
22	DF	KAZ	Amirali Orazbek
23	MF	KAZ	Ilkin Rustamov
24	DF	KAZ	Asylzhan Bulgakbaev
25	DF	KAZ	Konstantin Gorizanov
27	MF	KAZ	Dias Kushkumbaev
30	MF	KAZ	Azamat Aytpakaev
33	MF	KAZ	Nurkhan Baltash
40	GK	KAZ	Madiyar Toleubek
