= Murat Önal =

Turkish footballer

Personal information
- Full name: Murat Önal
- Date of birth: 20 July 1987 (age 39)
- Place of birth: Salihli, Manisa, Turkey
- Height: 1.77 m (5 ft 9 1/2 in)
- Positions: Striker; winger

Team information
- Current team: FC Lisse

Youth career
- 2001–2006: AFC
- 2006–2007: Club Brugge
- 2007–2008: ADO Den Haag

Senior career*
Years	Team	Apps	(Gls)
2006	AFC	7	(0)
2008–2011	FC Volendam	14	(0)
2012–2013	AC Kajaani	28	(9)
2013–2014	AFC	23	(15)
2014–2015	Kyran	47	(28)
2016–	FC Lisse	4	(2)
- * Club domestic league appearances and goals as of 4 March 2016

Murat Önal (born 20 July 1987) is a Turkish footballer who plays as a striker for FC Lisse in the Topklasse.

Önal began his career with Amsterdamsche FC and was promoted to the first team in the latter half of the 2005–06 season, appearing in seven league matches during the course of the campaign. He then moved to Club Brugge K.V. and spent the season with the club's youth team. Önal returned to the Netherlands and signed a contract with the reserves of ADO Den Haag. After a successful season Önal joined FC Volendam in July 2008. Having mainly appeared for the reserve, he made his debut in the Eredivisie on 8 March 2009 against Vitesse Arnhem. In April 2009, Önal signed a professional contract with Volendam until 2011.
