= FC Gefest =

Kazakh football club

- Full name: Football Club Gefest; Гефест Футбол Клубы
- Founded: 2008; 17 years ago
- Manager: Viktor Rymar
- League: Kazakhstan First Division
- 2011: 16th

FC Gefest (Kazakh: Гефест Футбол Клубы) is a Kazakhstani football club based in Karagandy.

== History ==
The club was formed in 2008. In 2009 the team debuted in Kazakhstan First Division and finished 9th in its first ever professional season. In 2010 the team gaming on stadium Sunkar which is located in Saran, Kazakhstan, near 30 km Karagandy. In 2012 the club did not start in any professional league.
