= Kazakhstan First League =

Association football league

First Division
- Founded: 1994; 32 years ago
- Country: Kazakhstan
- Confederation: UEFA (Europe)
- Number of clubs: 14
- Level on pyramid: 2
- Promotion to: Premier League
- Relegation to: Second League
- Domestic cup: Kazakhstan Cup
- Current champions: Caspiy (2nd title) (2025)
- Most championships: Okzhetpes (5)
- Website: pflk.kz kpl.kz
- Current: 2026 Kazakhstan First Division

The Kazakhstan First Division (Kazakh: Қазақстан бірінші лигасы, romanized: Qazaqstan bırınşı ligasy) is the second division of football in Kazakhstan. The League is controlled by the Football Union of Kazakhstan and feeds into the Kazakhstan Premier League, having been founded in 1994. It runs from spring and to late autumn, making each championship correspond to a calendar year.

== Seasons summary ==
Season	Champion	Clubs	Top scorer	Goals
1994	Caspiy	10	(Kazakhstan) Viktor Babenko (Zhetysu)	19
1995	Kaisar	13	(Kazakhstan) Sergei Kurnayev (Ferro Aktobe)	11
1996	not held			
1997	Ferro Aktobe	9	(Kazakhstan) Vladimir Glevich (Okzhetpes)	7
1998	Ordabasy	6	(Kazakhstan) Andrei Travin, Askar Kozhabergenov, Sergey Klimov (all - Kairat)	4
1999	Dinamo Shymkent	8	(Kazakhstan) Baglan Yergeshev Keden Shymkent	5
2000	Aktobe	7	(Kazakhstan) Andrey Nesmeyanov (Aktobe)	5
2001	Ordabasy	8	?	?
2002	Ekibastuzets	7	(Ukraine) Vadim Chizhikov (Ekibastuzets)	11
2003	Okzhetpes (NE) & Yassi (SW)	12+11	(Kazakhstan) Yerlan Urazayev (FC Almaty)	20
2004	Bolat (NE) & Zhambyl (SW)	13+13	(Kazakhstan) Vasiliy Prosekov (Energetik) & Aleksei Shakin (CSKA Almaty)	16
2005	Energetik (NE) & Kaisar (SW)	13+12	(Kazakhstan) Vasiliy Prosekov (Energetik)	34
2006	Avangard (NE) & Zhetysu (SW)	13+14	(Kazakhstan) Rustam Usmanov (Zhetysu)	32
2007	Kazakhmys	14+12	(Kazakhstan) Geysar Alakbarzadeh (Kazakhmys)	23
2008	Kazakhmys	14	(Kazakhstan) Igor Abdusheev (Aktobe-Zhas)	27
2009	Kairat	14	(Kazakhstan) Aleksei Maltsev (Akzhayik)	19
2010	Vostok	18	(Kazakhstan) Dauren Kussainov (Sunkar)	27
2011	Sunkar	17	(Kazakhstan) Kanat Akhmetov - (Aktobe-Zhas)	24
2012	Ile-Saulet	16	(Kazakhstan) Kuanysh Begalin - (Ekibastuzets)	22
2013	Kaisar	18	(Kazakhstan) Zhassulan Moldakaraev - (Kaisar)	28
2014	Okzhetpes	15	(Kazakhstan) Konstantin Zadorozhniy - (FC Sunkar)	23
2015	Akzhayik	13	(Kazakhstan) Oleg Khromcov - (Akzhayik)	28
2016	Kaisar	10	(Kazakhstan) Akeksey Shakin - (Altai)	14
2017	Zhetysu	9	(Bosnia and Herzegovina) Boško Stupić - (Kyzylzhar)	13 (3 pen.)
2018	Okzhetpes	12	(Kazakhstan) Abylaikhan Makhambetov - (Kyran)	20 (2 pen.)
2019	Kyzylzhar	14	(Kazakhstan) Aidos Tattybaev - (Caspiy)	19 (6 pen.)
2020	Aktobe & Atyrau	7+7		
2021	Aksu	12		
2022	Okzhetpes	14	(Guinea) Mamadou Diallo - (Kaisar)	8
2023	Elimai	15		
2024	Okzhetpes	16	(Kazakhstan) Zhasulan Moldakarayev - (Ulytau)	19
2025	Caspiy	14	(Kazakhstan) Miras Turlybek - (Caspiy)	23

Notes:

- Current club names shown in table. Historical names could be different.

== 2025 Member clubs ==
Locations of teams in the 2024 Kazakhstan First Division

Club	Stadium	City
Aktobe-2	Central Stadium	Aktobe
Akas	Zhas Kyran stadium	Almaty
Altai	Vostok Stadium	Oskemen
Irtysh	Central Stadium	Pavlodar
Caspiy	Zhastar Stadium	Aktau
Ekibastuz	Shakhtyor Stadium	Ekibastuz
Jetisay	Central Stadium	Zhetisay
Kairat-Zhastar	Central Stadium	Almaty
Khan Tengri	Khan Tengri Stadium	Almaty
Oñtüstik Akademia		Shymkent
Shakhter	Shakhter Stadium	Karaganda
SD Family		Astana
Taraz	Central Stadium	Taraz
Turkestan	Kazhymukan Munaitpasov Stadium	Shymkent
