= FC Shakhter-Bulat =

Kazakh football club

- Full name: Football Club Shakhter-Bulat; Шахтер-Болат футбол клубы
- Founded: 1961
- Dissolved: 2023
- Ground: Metallurg Stadium; Temirtau, Kazakhstan
- Capacity: 12,000
- Manager: Igor Soloshenko
- League: Kazakhstan First Division
- 2022: 13th

FC Shakhter-Bulat (Kazakh: Шахтер–Болат футбол клубы, romanized: Shakhter–Bolat fýtbol klýby) is a Kazakhstani football club based in Temirtau. It was previously known as FC Bolat CSKA (2004) and FC Bolat MSK(2005). It currently plays as the farm club of Shakhter Karagandy.

== History ==
Formed as Metallurg, the club was known as Stroitel between 1969 and 1977 before adopting their current name. They were a leading side in the Soviet-era game, winning the Kazakh SSR Cup seven times, including five consecutive triumphs between 1972 and 1976. Initially, the club transferred their status to the independent Kazakhstan; they were also founding members of the Kazakhstan Super League. However, barring a 7th-place finish in 1994, they were one of the weaker sides and were relegated to the Kazakhstan First Division in 1998. The club returned to the top flight in 2005, but set an unwanted record by drawing a single match and losing 29 to set a record low for points gained in the Kazakh premier league. They are currently First Division members.

On 11 December 2015, Bolat announced they would not be taking part in the 2016 Kazakhstan First Division, and would fold.

=== Names ===
- 1961 : Founded as Metallurg
- 1969 : Renamed Stroitel
- 1970 : Renamed Bulat
- 2003 : Renamed Bulat-CSKA
- 2005 : Renamed Bulat-MST
- 2007 : Renamed Bulat
- 2008 : Renamed Bulat-AMT
- 2010 : Renamed Bulat
- 2011 : Renamed Bulat-AMT
- 2016 : Renamed Shakhter-Bulat

== Current squad ==
Note: Flags indicate national team as defined under FIFA eligibility rules; some limited exceptions apply. Players may hold more than one non-FIFA nationality.

No.	Pos.	Nation	Player
1	GK	KAZ	Khamit Mataev
2	MF	KAZ	Konstantin Surovtsev
5	DF	KAZ	Yevgeny Gashin
7	MF	KAZ	Vladimir Kashtanov
28	DF	KAZ	Marat Rakishev
31	FW	KAZ	Timur Narkesken
10	MF	KAZ	Yevgeny Nesterov
11	DF	KAZ	Timur Zhakupov
12	GK	KAZ	Damir Mehbaliev
13	DF	KAZ	Talgat Kabdulov

No.	Pos.	Nation	Player
14	FW	KAZ	Aleksandr Fedorov
15	DF	KAZ	Vitali Artyomov
16	MF	KAZ	Nursultan Ganiyev
17	DF	KAZ	Baurzhan Nauryzbayev
18	MF	KAZ	Nursultan Zhusupov
19	DF	KAZ	Sergey Lunev
20	MF	KAZ	Stanislav Tarasov
30	MF	KAZ	Vladislav Akhmeyev
22	FW	KAZ	Vitali Genze
23	MF	KAZ	Zhasulan Kusainov
27	MF	KAZ	Konstantin Bernatski
