= 2023 Kazakhstan Premier League =

Kazakhstan Premier League
- Season: 2023
- Dates: 4 March – 29 October 2023
- Champions: Ordabasy
- Relegated: Aksu; Caspiy; Okzhetpes; Maktaaral
- Champions League: Ordabasy
- Europa League: Tobol
- Conference League: Aktobe; Astana
- Matches: 182
- Goals: 445 (2.45 per match)
- Top goalscorer: João Paulo (17)
- Biggest home win: Aktobe 5–1 Okzhetpes; 9 March 2023; Aktobe 4–0 Atyrau; 16 April 2023; Ordabasy 4–0 Kaisar; 6 May 2023
- Biggest away win: Atyrau 0–4 Okzhetpes; 2 April 2023
- Highest scoring: Aktobe 5–1 Okzhetpes; 9 March 2023; Aktobe 4–2 Kairat; 6 August 2023; Okzhetpes 3–3 Caspiy; 26 August 2023
- Longest winning run: Ordabasy (7 games)
- Longest unbeaten run: Ordabasy (16 games)
- Longest winless run: Okzhetpes (8 games)
- Longest losing run: Aksu (7 games)
- Highest attendance: 22,168 - Ordabasy vs Okzhetpes (21 May 2023)
- Lowest attendance: 100 - Okzhetpes vs Zhetysu (12 August 2023)
- Total attendance: 854,169
- Average attendance: 4,693( 1,264) (29 October 2023)
- All statistics correct as of 29 October 2023.

The 2023 Kazakhstan Premier League was the 32nd season of the Kazakhstan Premier League, the highest football league competition in Kazakhstan.

The winners (Ordabasy) qualified for the first qualifying round of the Champions League. The 2023 Kazakhstan Cup winners (Tobol) qualified for the first qualifying round of the 2024–25 UEFA Europa League. The runners-up (Astana) qualified for the second qualifying round of the 2024–25 UEFA Conference League, with the third-placed team (Aktobe) qualifying for the first qualifying round. The bottom three teams (Aksu, Caspiy, and Okzhetpes) and Maktaaral (relegated due to failing licensing process for the 2024 season) were relegated to the 2024 Kazakhstan First Division.

== Teams ==
Akzhayik, Turan (both relegated after 2 seasons in top flight) and Taraz (relegated after 4 seasons in top flight) were all relegated at the end of the 2022 season. They were replaced by Okzhetpes (promoted after a 2 seasons absence), Kaisar and Zhetysu (both clubs promoted after a single season absence) from the Kazakhstan First League. FC Astana entered the season as defending champions after winning their seventh title the previous season.

=== Team overview ===
Locations of teams in the 2023 Kazakhstan Premier League

Team	Location	Venue	Capacity
Aksu	Pavlodar	Central Stadium	11,828
Aktobe	Aktobe	Central Stadium	12,729
Astana	Astana	Astana Arena	30,200
Atyrau	Atyrau	Munaishy Stadium	8,900
Caspiy	Aktau	Zhastar Stadium	5,000
Kairat	Almaty	Central Stadium	23,804
Kaisar	Kyzylorda	Gany Muratbayev Stadium	7,500
Kyzylzhar	Petropavl	Karasai Stadium	11,000
Maktaaral	Atakent	Alpamys Batyr Stadium	3,000
Okzhetpes	Kokshetau	Alisher Sagynbayev Stadium	4,158
Ordabasy	Shymkent	Kazhymukan Munaitpasov Stadium	20,000
Shakhter	Karaganda	Shakhter Stadium	19,500
Tobol	Kostanay	Central Stadium	9,500
Zhetysu	Taldykorgan	Samat Suyumbayev Stadium	4,000

=== Personnel and kits ===
Note: Flags indicate national team as has been defined under FIFA eligibility rules. Players and Managers may hold more than one non-FIFA nationality.

Team	Manager	Captain	Kit manufacturer	Shirt sponsor
Aksu	(Kazakhstan) Adnan Timurbayev	(Kazakhstan) Ruslan Esimov	Joma	Olimpbet
Aktobe	(Kazakhstan) Andrei Karpovich	(Kazakhstan) Adilkhan Tanzharikov	Adidas	Olimpbet
Astana	(Kazakhstan) Grigori Babayan	(Kazakhstan) Abzal Beisebekov	Nike	Samruk Kazyna, Olimpbet, Chery, SportQory
Atyrau	(Belarus) Vitaly Zhukovsky	(Belarus) Igor Stasevich	Macron	GAZ Stroy Montazh KZ, Olimpbet
Caspiy	(Kazakhstan) Konstantin Gorovenko	(Kazakhstan) Nurlybek Ayazbaev	Hummel	KazAzot, Rixos Wather World
Kairat	(Kazakhstan) Kirill Keker	(Kazakhstan) Sergey Keiler	Joma	1XBET
Kaisar	(Russia) Viktor Kumykov	(Kazakhstan) Ruslan Sakhalbaev	Joma	
Kyzylzhar	(Kazakhstan) Ali Aliyev	(Kazakhstan) Erkin Tapalov	Diadora	Olimpbet
Maktaaral	(Kazakhstan) Kayrat Nurdauletov	(Belarus) Ruslan Yudenkov	Nike	
Okzhetpes	(Kazakhstan) Maksat Babayev	(Kazakhstan) Zhasulan Moldakaraev	Joma	
Ordabasy	(Belarus) Aleksandr Sednyov	(Kazakhstan) Askhat Tagybergen	Nike	Olimpbet
Shakhter	(Kazakhstan) Igor Soloshenko	(Kazakhstan) Igor Shatsky	Joma	Olimpbet
Tobol	(Serbia) Milić Ćurčić	(Kazakhstan) Serikzhan Muzhikov	Adidas	Polymetal, Olimpbet
Zhetysu	(Kazakhstan) Askar Kozhabergenov	(Kazakhstan) Andrey Pasechenko	Nike	Kainar

=== Foreign players ===
The number of foreign players is restricted to eight per KPL team. A team can use only five foreign players on the field in each game. From the 2020 season, the KFF announced that players from countries of the Eurasian Economic Union would not be counted towards a club's foreign player limit.

For transfers during the season, see Winter 2022–23 transfers and Summer 2023 transfers.

Club	Player 1	Player 2	Player 3	Player 4	Player 5	Player 6	Player 7	Player 8	EAEU Players	Former Players
Aksu	(Bosnia and Herzegovina) Nikola Eskić	(Brazil) Bryan Garcia	(Cape Verde) **Mailson Lima**	(Ghana) David Mawutor	(Haiti) **Alex Junior**	(Nigeria) Faith Obilor	(Nigeria) Chidi Osuchukwu	(Serbia) Marko Nikolić	(Belarus) **Andrey Solovey** (Belarus) Yevgeny Zemko (Russia) Yevgeni Kobzar (Russia) Arsen Siukayev	(Belarus) **Alyaksandr Hutar** (Brazil) Luiz Guedes (Guinea-Bissau) **Toni Silva** (Kyrgyzstan) **Kayrat Zhyrgalbek uulu** (Portugal) Gilson Costa (Russia) Islam Zhilov (Ukraine) Artur Murza
Aktobe	(Argentina) Leonel Strumia	(Brazil) China	(Brazil) Élder Santana	(Croatia) Andrija Filipović	(Georgia (country)) Luka Gadrani	(Israel) Ihab Ganayem	(Ivory Coast) Anderson Niangbo	(Montenegro) **Miloš Raičković**	(Belarus) **Dmitry Bessmertny** (Russia) Roman Izotov (Russia) Miroslav Lobantsev (Russia) Dmitri Yashin	(France) Hugo Vidémont (Lithuania) **Artūras Žulpa** (Russia) Daniil Penchikov (Russia) Idris Umayev
Astana	(Bosnia and Herzegovina) **Stjepan Lončar**	(Croatia) Josip Čondrić	(Croatia) **Marin Tomasov**	(The Gambia) **Dembo Darboe**	(Montenegro) **Žarko Tomašević**	(North Macedonia) Aleksa Amanović	(Serbia) Dušan Jovančić	(France) Fabien Ourega	(Armenia) **Varazdat Haroyan** (Armenia) **Kamo Hovhannisyan** (Belarus) **Max Ebong**	(Serbia) Igor Ivanović
Atyrau	(Brazil) Matheus Bissi	(Lithuania) Domantas Antanavičius	(North Macedonia) Demir Imeri	(North Macedonia) Florijan Kadriu	(Nigeria) Effiong Nsungusi	(Slovenia) Jakob Novak	(Tajikistan) Fatkhullo Olimzoda	(Ukraine) Oleksandr Noyok	(Belarus) **Yegor Khatkevich** (Belarus) **Ihar Stasevich** (Belarus) **Nikita Stepanov** (Russia) Yevgeni Kozlov (Russia) Soslan Takulov	(Ukraine) Maksym Dehtyarov
Caspiy	(Albania) Shqiprim Taipi	(North Macedonia) Stefan Kocev	(Serbia) Filip Avric	(Slovenia) Žiga Ovsenek					(Belarus) Ilya Chernyak (Belarus) **Maksim Plotnikov** (Russia) Georgi Bugulov (Russia) Mikhail Chernomyrdin (Armenia) Solomon Udo	(Belarus) **Dmitry Podstrelov** (Belarus) Aleksey Zalesky (Georgia (country)) **Jaba Jighauri** (Georgia (country)) Giorgi Pantsulaia (Kyrgyzstan) **Erzhan Tokotayev** (Lithuania) **Vilius Armanavičius** (Portugal) Rúben Brígido (Russia) Stanislav Krapukhin (Senegal) Abdoulaye Diakate
Kairat	(Brazil) João Paulo	(Cameroon) **Macky Bagnack**	(Israel) **Ofri Arad**						(Russia) Anton Krachkovsky (Russia) Dmitry Sergeyev (Russia) Vadim Ulyanov (Russia) **Viktor Vasin**	(Kyrgyzstan) **Gulzhigit Alykulov**
Kaisar	(Brazil) João Pedro	(Burkina Faso) **Ben Aziz Zagré**	(Georgia (country)) Giorgi Bukhaidze	(Ivory Coast) Geo Danny Ekra	(Montenegro) Goran Milojko	(Ukraine) Vitaliy Pryndeta	(Serbia) Nikola Dišić	(Moldova) Ștefan Sicaci	(Belarus) Dzmitry Baradzin (Belarus) Vasily Sovpel (Russia) Vladimir Ghinaitis	(Guinea-Bissau) **Prosper Mendy**
Kyzylzhar	(Argentina) Pablo Podio	(Bosnia and Herzegovina) Mladen Veselinović	(Croatia) Ivan Graf	(Georgia (country)) Luka Imnadze	(Montenegro) **Darko Bulatović**	(Montenegro) Boris Smiljanić	(Ukraine) Yuriy Bushman	(Ukraine) Dmytro Khlyobas	(Belarus) **Yevgeny Beryozkin** (Belarus) **Nikita Naumov** (Belarus) Roman Stepanov (Russia) Maksim Chikanchi	(Belgium) Bryan Van Den Bogaert (Brazil) Pernambuco (Brazil) Rafael Sabino (Georgia (country)) Tamaz Makatsaria
Maktaaral	(Brazil) Victor Braga	(Brazil) Charleston	(France) Billal Sebaihi	(Georgia (country)) **Lasha Parunashvili**	(Ivory Coast) Dramane Koné	(Togo) **Serge Nyuiadzi**			(Armenia) **Aram Ayrapetyan** (Belarus) Anton Shramchenko (Belarus) Uladzislaw Kasmynin (Belarus) **Ruslan Yudenkov** (Kyrgyzstan) **Odilzhon Abdurakhmanov** (Russia) Yegor Potapov	(Armenia) **Petros Avetisyan** (Colombia) Juan Sandoval (Democratic Republic of the Congo) **Junior Kabananga** (Ivory Coast) Sékou Doumbia (Ivory Coast) Shada Ouedraogo
Okzhetpes	(Bosnia and Herzegovina) **Benjamin Tatar**	(Serbia) Srđan Dimitrov	(Ukraine) Maksym Drachenko	(Ukraine) Dmytro Ryzhuk	(Ukraine) Ivan Tsyupa				(Russia) Ruslan Bolov (Russia) Nikita Chagrov (Russia) Vyacheslav Grab (Russia) Aleksei Tatayev	(Belarus) Aleksandr Dzhigero (Ukraine) Ivan Brikner
Ordabasy	(Brazil) Auro Jr.	(Croatia) Bernardo Matić	(Guinea-Bissau) **Jorginho**	(Senegal) Mamadou Mbodj	(Ukraine) **Artem Byesyedin**	(Ukraine) **Yevheniy Makarenko**	(Uzbekistan) **Shokhboz Umarov**	(Uzbekistan) **Bobur Abdikholikov**	(Belarus) Vsevolod Sadovsky	(Brazil) Victor Braga (Serbia) **Radosav Petrović**
Shakhter	(Colombia) Roger Cañas	(Colombia) Francisco Mina	(Georgia (country)) Temur Chogadze	(Georgia (country)) Anton Tolordava	(Serbia) Stefan Bukorac					(Bosnia and Herzegovina) Đorđe Ćosić
Tobol	(Bosnia and Herzegovina) Jovan Ilic	(Bosnia and Herzegovina) Momčilo Mrkaić	(Ivory Coast) Serges Déblé	(Serbia) Igor Ivanović	(Serbia) Bojan Mlađović	(Serbia) Ivan Rogač	(Serbia) **Miljan Vukadinović**	(Ukraine) **Yevhen Shakhov**	(Belarus) Pavel Zabelin (Russia) Albert Gabarayev (Russia) Pavel Kireyenko (Russia) Ivan Konovalov	(Russia) Timur Akmurzin (Uzbekistan) **Igor Sergeyev** (Bosnia and Herzegovina) Asmir Suljić
Zhetysu	(Georgia (country)) **Mate Tsintsadze**	(Ivory Coast) Moussa Bakayoko	(Ivory Coast) Didier Kadio	(Serbia) Nikola Cuckić	(Serbia) Aleksandar Ješić	(Serbia) Anes Rušević	(Ukraine) Ivan Brikner		(Belarus) Pavel Nazarenko (Russia) Layonel Adams (Russia) Sergei Revyakin	(Algeria) **Ilias Hassani** (Belarus) Ruslan Teverov (Georgia (country)) Rati Ardazishvili (Palestine) **Fadi Zidan** (Serbia) Danilo Aleksic (Serbia) Jovan Stojanović

In bold: Players that have been capped for their national team.

=== Managerial changes ===
Team	Outgoing manager	Manner of departure	Date of vacancy	Position in table	Incoming manager	Date of appointment
Shakhter Karagandy	Vakhid Masudov			Pre-Season	Igor Soloshenko	18 January 2023
Tobol	Milan Milanović			Pre-Season	Milic Curcic	10 January 2023
Caspiy	Kakhaber Tskhadadze	Mutual Termination	13 April 2023	14th	Igor Angelovski	18 April 2023
Zhetysu	Almas Kulshinbaev		26 April 2023	10th	Askar Kozhabergenov	26 April 2023
Aksu	Ruslan Kostyshyn	Mutual agreement	28 April 2023	13th	Oyrat Saduov (Caretaker)	29 April 2023
Aksu	Oyrat Saduov (Caretaker)	End of role	3 May 2023	13th	Vakhid Masudov	4 May 2023
Maktaaral	Konstantin Gorovenko	Resigned	14 May 2023	14th	Ruslan Esatov (Caretaker)	14 May 2023
Maktaaral	Ruslan Esatov (Caretaker)	End of role	19 May 2023	14th	Kayrat Nurdauletov	19 May 2023
Okzhetpes	Sergei Popkov	Sacked	10 July 2023	11th	Andrey Ferapontov	11 July 2023
Caspiy	Igor Angelovski	Resigned	18 July 2023	13th	Sashko Poposki (Caretaker)	18 July 2023
Caspiy	Sashko Poposki (Caretaker)	Resigned	2 August 2023	13th	Konstantin Gorovenko	2 August 2023

== Regular season ==
=== League table ===
Pos	Team	Pld	W	D	L	GF	GA	GD	Pts	Qualification or relegation
1	Ordabasy (C)	26	18	4	4	48	21	+27	58	Qualification for the Champions League first qualifying round
2	Astana	26	16	5	5	36	24	+12	53	Qualification for the Conference League second qualifying round
3	Aktobe	26	13	11	2	44	23	+21	50	Qualification for the Conference League first qualifying round
4	Kairat	26	12	8	6	44	32	+12	44	
5	Kyzylzhar	26	11	6	9	25	23	+2	39	
6	Kaisar	26	10	6	10	31	30	+1	36	
7	Atyrau	26	8	10	8	24	27	−3	34	
8	Tobol	26	9	7	10	29	33	−4	34	Qualification for the Europa League first qualifying round (Note: Tobol qualified for the Europa League first qualifying round by winning the 2023 Kazakhstan Cup.)
9	Maktaaral (D, R)	26	8	5	13	29	32	−3	29	Expelled from league (Note: Maktaaral were expelled from the league due to failing licensing process.)
10	Shakhter Karagandy	26	7	8	11	31	36	−5	29	
11	Zhetysu	26	8	5	13	27	38	−11	29	
12	Okzhetpes (R)	26	7	6	13	26	37	−11	27	Relegation to the Kazakhstan First Division
13	Caspiy (R)	26	4	8	14	28	44	−16	20	Relegation to the Kazakhstan First Division
14	Aksu (R)	26	5	3	18	23	45	−22	18	Relegation to the Kazakhstan First Division

Source: UEFA, Soccerway
Rules for classification: 1) Points; 2) Goal difference; 3) Matches won; 4) Goals scored; 5) Away goals scored; 6) Head-to-head points; 7) Head-to-head matches won; 8) Head-to-head goal difference; 9) Head-to-head goals scored; 10) Head-to-head away goals scored; 11) Draw.
(C) Champions; (D) Disqualified; (R) Relegated

=== Results ===
==== Results table ====
Home \ Away	AKS	AKT	AST	ATY	CAS	KRT	KSR	KYZ	MAK	OKZ	ORD	SHA	TOB	ZHE
Aksu		1–1	0–1	4–1	0–1	1–3	2–0	0–2	2–1	0–1	0–1	2–1	0–3	2–1
Aktobe	2–1		2–0	4–0	0–0	4–2	1–0	1–3	1–1	5–1	2–1	2–0	1–1	2–2
Astana	1–0	1–4		0–0	3–1	0–3	1–1	3–2	2–0	5–2	2–0	2–1	2–1	2–1
Atyrau	2–1	0–0	0–0		1–0	0–0	2–1	0–0	2–0	0–4	1–1	2–1	3–0	0–1
Caspiy	3–1	2–2	1–2	1–1		1–1	1–3	1–2	0–2	2–1	1–0	1–1	0–1	1–2
Kairat	4–1	2–1	1–0	2–2	3–1		0–3	3–0	2–2	2–1	2–2	0–0	3–0	2–3
Kaisar	2–2	0–1	1–2	1–0	3–1	0–0		0–1	0–2	0–1	2–3	2–1	1–0	1–1
Kyzylzhar	1–0	0–0	1–0	1–0	1–1	2–1	0–1		1–0	1–2	0–1	1–1	1–1	1–0
Maktaaral	2–0	1–2	0–1	0–1	3–1	3–1	2–2	2–1		0–1	1–2	3–1	1–1	1–2
Okzhetpes	3–0	1–1	0–0	0–0	3–3	0–1	0–1	0–1	1–1		0–4	1–1	1–2	2–1
Ordabasy	2–0	1–1	1–2	2–1	3–1	1–0	4–0	2–1	1–0	1–0		3–1	4–1	2–0
Shakhter Karagandy	2–1	0–1	1–1	2–2	1–0	1–1	2–2	1–0	3–0	2–0	1–4		2–1	0–1
Tobol	3–1	2–2	0–1	1–0	1–1	2–3	0–2	1–0	1–0	2–0	0–0	2–1		1–2
Zhetysu	1–1	0–1	0–2	0–2	3–2	1–2	0–2	1–1	0–1	1–0	1–2	1–3	1–1	

Source: Soccerway
Legend: Blue = home team win; Yellow = draw; Red = away team win.

== Statistics ==
=== Top scorers ===
As of matches played on 29 October 2023

Rank	Player	Club	Goals
1	(Brazil) João Paulo	Kairat	17
2	(Kazakhstan) Askhat Tagybergen	Ordabasy	11
3	(Russia) Yevgeni Kozlov	Atyrau	8
3	(Belarus) Dzmitry Baradzin	Kaisar	8
3	(Kazakhstan) Abat Aymbetov	Astana	8
3	(Kazakhstan) Ramazan Karimov	Maktaaral	8
3	(Kazakhstan) Artur Shushenachev	Kairat	8
8	(Uzbekistan) Bobur Abdikholikov	Ordabasy	7
8	(Ivory Coast) Serges Déblé	Tobol	7
8	(Nigeria) Effiong Nsungusi	Atyrau	7
8	(Kazakhstan) Ivan Sviridov	Shakhter Karagandy	7

=== Hat-tricks ===
Player	For	Against	Result	Date	Ref.
(Croatia) Marin Tomasov	Astana	Okzhetpes	5–2 (H)	27 September 2023	

=== Clean sheets ===
As of matches played 29 October 2023

Rank	Player	Club	Clean sheets
1	(Belarus) Yegor Khatkevich	Atyrau	11
2	(Kazakhstan) Stas Pokatilov	Aktobe	10
3	(Croatia) Josip Čondrić	Astana	9
4	(Kazakhstan) Bekkhan Shayzada	Ordabasy	8
4	(Moldova) Ștefan Sicaci	Kaisar	8
6	(Belarus) Raman Stsyapanaw	Kyzylzhar	7
7	(Kazakhstan) Igor Shatsky	Shakhter Karagandy	6
7	(Russia) Nikita Chagrov	Okzhetpes	6
9	(Kazakhstan) Danil Ustimenko	Kairat	5
9	(Russia) Ivan Konovalov	Tobol	5

== Awards ==
=== Monthly awards ===
Month	Manager of the Month		Player of the Month		Goal of the Month		References
Month	Manager	Club	Player	Club	Player	Club	References
March	(Kazakhstan) Ali Aliyev	Kyzylzhar	(Kazakhstan) Maksim Samorodov	Aktobe	(Croatia) Andrija Filipović	Aktobe	
April	(Kazakhstan) Ali Aliyev	Kyzylzhar	(Brazil) João Paulo	Kairat	(Kazakhstan) Askhat Tagybergen	Ordabasy	
May	(Belarus) Aleksandr Sednyov	Ordabasy	(Kazakhstan) Askhat Tagybergen	Ordabasy	(Belarus) Ihar Stasevich	Atyrau	
June	(Kazakhstan) Kayrat Nurdauletov	Maktaaral	(Brazil) João Paulo	Kairat	(Kazakhstan) Alisher Kenzhegulov	Aktobe	
July	(Serbia) Milic Curcic	Tobol	(Kazakhstan) Askhat Tagybergen	Ordabasy			
August	(Kazakhstan) Kayrat Nurdauletov	Maktaaral	(Kazakhstan) Askhat Tagybergen	Ordabasy	(Croatia) Andrija Filipović	Aktobe	
September	(Kazakhstan) Andrei Karpovich	Aktobe	(Kazakhstan) Askhat Tagybergen	Ordabasy			

== Attendances ==
#	Football club	Home games	Average attendance
1	FC Ordabasy	13	16,602
2	FC Kairat	13	9,705
3	FC Aktobe	13	8,396
4	FC Astana	13	6,002
5	FC Atyrau	13	4,250
6	FC Kaisar	13	4,162
7	FC Shakhter Karagandy	13	4,108
8	FC Aksu	13	3,692
9	FC Maktaaral	13	2,527
10	FC Tobol	13	2,315
11	FC Zhetysu	13	2,000
12	FC Caspiy	13	1,908
13	FC Kyzylzhar	13	1,767
14	FC Okzhetpes	13	525

Source: European Football Statistics
