= List of Kazakhstan football transfers winter 2022–23 =

This is a list of Kazakh football transfers during the 2022 winter transfer window.

== Kazakhstan Premier League 2023 ==
=== Aksu ===
In: Note: Flags indicate national team as defined under FIFA eligibility rules; some limited exceptions apply. Players may hold more than one non-FIFA nationality.

No.	Pos.	Nation	Player
1	GK	KAZ	Igor Trofimets (from (Kazakhstan) Shakhter Karagandy)
2	DF	KAZ	Yeldos Akhmetov (from (Kazakhstan) Taraz)
6	MF	KAZ	Sultan Sagnayev (from (Kazakhstan) Astana)
9	FW	BRA	Luiz Guedes (from (Kazakhstan) Ordabasy)
10	MF	KAZ	Dinmukhamed Karaman (from (Kazakhstan) Taraz)
15	DF	BRA	Bryan Garcia (from Astana)
18	MF	BIH	Nikola Eskić (from (Lithuania) Riteriai)
20	MF	KAZ	Ramazan Orazov (from (Kazakhstan) Aktobe)
33	FW	BLR	Andrey Solovey (on loan from (Belarus) Shakhtyor Soligorsk)
70	MF	KAZ	Alisher Suley (from (Kazakhstan) Caspiy)
77	MF	UKR	Artur Murza (from (Latvia) Valmiera)
87	MF	KAZ	Zhaslan Kairkenov (from (Kazakhstan) Astana, previously on loan)
93	MF	NGA	Chidi Osuchukwu (from (Kazakhstan) Tobol)
—	DF	KAZ	Pavel Barkunov (loan return from (Kazakhstan) Zhenis)

Out: Note: Flags indicate national team as defined under FIFA eligibility rules; some limited exceptions apply. Players may hold more than one non-FIFA nationality.

No.	Pos.	Nation	Player
1	GK	KAZ	Marsel Islamkulov (to (Kyrgyzstan) Abdysh-Ata Kant)
5	DF	KAZ	Gafurzhan Suyumbayev (to (Kazakhstan) Ordabasy)
6	MF	SRB	Lazar Zličić (to (Slovenia) NŠ Mura)
19	DF	KAZ	Grigory Sartakov
21	MF	KAZ	Yerkebulan Tungyshbayev (to (Kazakhstan) Ordabasy)
71	GK	UKR	Yevhen Kucherenko (loan return to (Ukraine) Kolos Kovalivka)
88	MF	RUS	Mikhail Bakayev (to (Russia) Alania Vladikavkaz)
96	DF	UKR	Oleksiy Dytyatyev (to (Ukraine) Lviv)

=== Aktobe ===
In: Note: Flags indicate national team as defined under FIFA eligibility rules; some limited exceptions apply. Players may hold more than one non-FIFA nationality.

No.	Pos.	Nation	Player
4	DF	GEO	Luka Gadrani (from (Kazakhstan) Taraz)
5	MF	ARG	Leonel Strumia (from (Latvia) Liepāja)
9	FW	KAZ	Abylaykhan Zhumabek (from (Kazakhstan) Taraz)
15	MF	CIV	Anderson Niangbo (on loan from (Belgium) Gent)
17	FW	RUS	Idris Umayev (on loan from (Russia) Akhmat Grozny)
19	MF	MNE	Miloš Raičković (from (Russia) Akhmat Grozny)
21	FW	CRO	Andrija Filipović (from (Kazakhstan) Atyrau)
23	DF	RUS	Daniil Penchikov (from (Russia) Pari NN)
41	GK	RUS	Miroslav Lobantsev (from (Kazakhstan) Kyzylzhar)
88	DF	RUS	Dmitri Yashin (from (Belarus) Torpedo-BelAZ Zhodino)
93	FW	BRA	Élder Santana (from (Portugal) Gil Vicente)

Out: Note: Flags indicate national team as defined under FIFA eligibility rules; some limited exceptions apply. Players may hold more than one non-FIFA nationality.

No.	Pos.	Nation	Player
7	FW	UKR	Vitaliy Balashov
9	FW	BRA	China (loan return to (Ukraine) Lviv)
20	GK	SRB	Saša Stamenković
21	FW	GHA	Ernest Antwi
22	FW	RWA	Gerard Gohou
23	DF	KAZ	Temirlan Yerlanov (to (Kazakhstan) Ordabasy)
25	MF	LBR	Joachim Adukor
26	MF	KAZ	Ramazan Orazov (to (Kazakhstan) Aksu)
27	DF	KAZ	Yury Logvinenko (Retired)
28	FW	RUS	Serder Serderov (loan return to (Croatia) Istra 1961)
30	DF	MDA	Vladimir Ghinaitis
55	GK	KAZ	Evgeniy Sitdikov
88	MF	RUS	Ruslan Kambolov

=== Astana ===
In: Note: Flags indicate national team as defined under FIFA eligibility rules; some limited exceptions apply. Players may hold more than one non-FIFA nationality.

No.	Pos.	Nation	Player
21	MF	KAZ	Elkhan Astanov (from (Kazakhstan) Ordabasy)
23	MF	FRA	Fabien Ourega (from (Lithuania) Žalgiris)
29	MF	SRB	Dušan Jovančić (from (Kazakhstan) Tobol)
33	DF	MNE	Žarko Tomašević (from (Kazakhstan) Tobol)
45	DF	MKD	Aleksa Amanović (from (Kazakhstan) Tobol)
88	FW	GAM	Dembo Darboe (on loan from (United Arab Emirates) Al-Nasr)
93	GK	CRO	Josip Čondrić (from (Bosnia and Herzegovina) Zrinjski Mostar)
—	DF	ARM	Varazdat Haroyan

Out: Note: Flags indicate national team as defined under FIFA eligibility rules; some limited exceptions apply. Players may hold more than one non-FIFA nationality.

No.	Pos.	Nation	Player
3	DF	BLR	Artsyom Rakhmanaw
6	DF	BRA	Bryan Garcia (to (Kazakhstan) Aksu)
14	MF	FRA	Jérémy Manzorro (to (Poland) Sandecja Nowy Sącz)
19	FW	FRA	Keelan Lebon (to (Azerbaijan) Neftçi)
22	MF	KAZ	Sultan Sagnayev (on loan to (Kazakhstan) Aksu)
23	DF	BLR	Denis Polyakov (to (Israel) Hapoel Haifa)
28	MF	KAZ	Yury Pertsukh (to (Kazakhstan) Shakhter Karagandy)
32	DF	KAZ	Talgat Kusyapov (on loan to (Kazakhstan) Caspiy)
33	DF	UKR	Danylo Beskorovaynyi (loan return to (Slovakia) DAC 1904)
34	GK	SRB	Marko Milošević (to (Hungary) Debreceni)
77	MF	POR	Pedro Eugénio (to (Saudi Arabia) Al-Adalah)
—	DF	KAZ	Sagi Sovet (on loan to (Kazakhstan) Okzhetpes, previously on loan at (Kazakhstan) Maktaaral)
—	MF	KAZ	Zhaslan Kairkenov (to (Kazakhstan) Aksu, previously on loan)
—	MF	KAZ	Meyrambek Kalmyrza (to (Kazakhstan) Okzhetpes, previously on loan)

=== Atyrau ===
In: Note: Flags indicate national team as defined under FIFA eligibility rules; some limited exceptions apply. Players may hold more than one non-FIFA nationality.

No.	Pos.	Nation	Player
1	GK	BLR	Yegor Khatkevich (from (Belarus) Dinamo Minsk)
4	DF	KAZ	Adilbek Zhumakhanov (loan return from (Kazakhstan) Kaisar)
9	FW	NGA	Effiong Nsungusi (from (Denmark) HB Køge)
11	MF	RUS	Yevgeni Kozlov (from (Kazakhstan) Kyzylzhar)
14	MF	KAZ	Nauryzbek Zhagorov (loan return from (Kazakhstan) Kyran)
17	FW	KAZ	Oralkhan Omirtayev (from (Kazakhstan) Akzhayik)
18	DF	BLR	Nikita Stepanov (from (Belarus) Isloch Minsk Raion)
21	MF	SVN	Jakob Novak
22	MF	BLR	Ihar Stasevich
26	DF	KAZ	Olzhas Kerimzhanov (from (Kazakhstan) Turan)
29	MF	KAZ	Mukagali Pangerey (loan return from (Kazakhstan) Okzhetpes)
55	MF	UKR	Oleksandr Noyok (from (Israel) Maccabi Bnei Reineh)
—	MF	KAZ	Karim Smykov (from (Kazakhstan) Kairat)

Out: Note: Flags indicate national team as defined under FIFA eligibility rules; some limited exceptions apply. Players may hold more than one non-FIFA nationality.

No.	Pos.	Nation	Player
1	GK	KAZ	Azamat Zhomartov
3	DF	KAZ	Ravil Ibragimov (loan return to (Kazakhstan) Kairat)
6	MF	KAZ	Altynbek Saparov
7	MF	KAZ	Asylbek Seytkaliev
10	FW	POL	Piotr Grzelczak
11	MF	CRO	Andrija Filipović (to (Kazakhstan) Aktobe)
13	DF	RUS	Nikolai Tarasov (to (Uzbekistan) Qizilqum Zarafshon)
15	DF	KAZ	Aleksandr Sokolenko
17	FW	RUS	Denis Mitrofanov (to (Belarus) Isloch Minsk Raion)
19	MF	TJK	Khusrav Toirov (to (Ukraine) Shakhtar Donetsk)
21	FW	RUS	Pavel Dolgov (to (Russia) Chayka Peschanokopskoye)
25	DF	POL	Paweł Baranowski (to (Poland) Ruch Chorzów)
43	MF	BIH	Todor Petrović (to (Vietnam) Hanoi Police)
77	GK	ARM	Aram Ayrapetyan (to (Kazakhstan) Maktaaral)
88	MF	RUS	Dmitri Pletnyov (to (Belarus) Arsenal Dzerzhinsk)

=== Caspiy ===
In: Note: Flags indicate national team as defined under FIFA eligibility rules; some limited exceptions apply. Players may hold more than one non-FIFA nationality.

No.	Pos.	Nation	Player
2	DF	MKD	Stefan Kocev (from (North Macedonia) Bregalnica Štip)
7	MF	KAZ	Bekzat Kabylan (loan return from (Kazakhstan) Turan)
8	MF	LTU	Vilius Armanavičius (from (Lithuania) Hegelmann)
9	MF	GEO	Jaba Jighauri (from (Georgia (country)) Dinamo Batumi)
13	DF	BLR	Aleksey Zalesky (from (Belarus) Torpedo-BelAZ Zhodino)
14	FW	GEO	Giorgi Pantsulaia (from (Georgia (country)) Dinamo Batumi)
18	GK	KAZ	Sultanbek Dosakhanov (from (Kazakhstan) Kairat)
20	FW	BLR	Dmitry Podstrelov (from (Belarus) Shakhtyor Soligorsk)
21	MF	SEN	Abdoulaye Diakate (from (Kazakhstan) Turan)
22	DF	KAZ	Talgat Kusyapov (on loan from (Kazakhstan) Astana)
35	GK	KGZ	Erzhan Tokotayev (from (Kazakhstan) Turan)
49	GK	BLR	Maksim Plotnikov (from (Belarus) Shakhtyor Soligorsk)
93	DF	RUS	Georgi Bugulov (from (Belarus) Slavia Mozyr)
99	FW	RUS	Stanislav Krapukhin (from (Latvia) Auda)
—	MF	KAZ	Daniyar Usenov (from (Kazakhstan) Kairat)

Out: Note: Flags indicate national team as defined under FIFA eligibility rules; some limited exceptions apply. Players may hold more than one non-FIFA nationality.

No.	Pos.	Nation	Player
1	GK	KAZ	Nurlybek Ayazbaev
7	MF	CRO	Ivan Pešić (to (Armenia) Alashkert)
8	MF	KAZ	Yerkebulan Nurgaliyev (to (Kazakhstan) Spartak Semey)
9	MF	KAZ	Aslan Adil (loan return to (Kazakhstan) Zhetysu)
13	MF	RUS	Pavel Kireyenko (to (Kazakhstan) Tobol)
14	DF	UKR	Taras Bondarenko (to (Serbia) Radnik Surdulica)
21	MF	GEO	Rati Ardazishvili (to (Kazakhstan) Zhetysu)
22	DF	UKR	Artem Baranovskyi
23	MF	KAZ	Kuandyk Nursultanov
28	DF	KAZ	Viktor Dmitrenko
30	MF	KAZ	Baқdaulet Konlimkos
48	MF	FRA	Chafik Tigroudja (to (Lithuania) Panevėžys)
77	MF	BRA	Ruan Teles
81	MF	KAZ	Maksim Vaganov (loan return to (Kazakhstan) Ordabasy)
92	GK	RUS	Aleksei Kozlov (to (Belarus) Naftan Novopolotsk)
95	MF	KAZ	Alisher Suley (to (Kazakhstan) Aksu)
—	DF	KAZ	Ruslan Zhanysbaev (released, previously on loan to (Kazakhstan) Turan)

=== Kairat ===
In: Note: Flags indicate national team as defined under FIFA eligibility rules; some limited exceptions apply. Players may hold more than one non-FIFA nationality.

No.	Pos.	Nation	Player
15	DF	ISR	Ofri Arad (on loan from (Israel) Maccabi Haifa)
20	MF	RUS	Dmitry Sergeyev (from (Russia) Zenit St.Petersburg)
—	MF	KAZ	Alen Aymanov (loan return to (Kazakhstan) Turan)

Out: Note: Flags indicate national team as defined under FIFA eligibility rules; some limited exceptions apply. Players may hold more than one non-FIFA nationality.

No.	Pos.	Nation	Player
2	DF	KAZ	Sultanbek Astanov (to (Kazakhstan) Ordabasy)
3	DF	CMR	Macky Bagnack (on loan to (Russia) Pari NN)
28	DF	KAZ	Rustam Emirov (to (Kazakhstan) Khan Tengri)
14	MF	KAZ	Adam Adakhadzhiev (to (Kazakhstan) Khan Tengri)
17	MF	KAZ	Daniyar Usenov (to (Kazakhstan) Caspiy)
47	FW	KAZ	Alisher Rakhimzhanov (to (Kazakhstan) Khan Tengri)
—	DF	CMR	David Ekwe
—	DF	KAZ	Nuraly Alip (to (Russia) Zenit St.Petersburg, previously on loan)

=== Kaisar ===
In: Note: Flags indicate national team as defined under FIFA eligibility rules; some limited exceptions apply. Players may hold more than one non-FIFA nationality.

No.	Pos.	Nation	Player
5	DF	KAZ	Adilet Kenesbek (from (Kazakhstan) Taraz)
11	FW	KAZ	Bakdaulet Zulfikarov (from (Kazakhstan) Turan)
18	DF	UKR	Vitaliy Pryndeta (from (Kazakhstan) Akzhayik)
20	MF	MNE	Goran Milojko (from (Uzbekistan) Andijon)
23	DF	GNB	Prosper Mendy (from (Bulgaria) Spartak Varna)
27	FW	GEO	Giorgi Bukhaidze (from (Malta) Marsa)
30	DF	MDA	Vladimir Ghinaitis (from (Kazakhstan) Aktobe)
44	DF	BFA	Ben Zagré
45	FW	SRB	Nikola Dišić (from (Serbia) Zlatibor Čajetina)
55	MF	CIV	Geo Danny Ekra
88	GK	MDA	Ștefan Sicaci (from (Kazakhstan) Akzhayik)

Out: Note: Flags indicate national team as defined under FIFA eligibility rules; some limited exceptions apply. Players may hold more than one non-FIFA nationality.

No.	Pos.	Nation	Player
1	GK	KAZ	Nurmat Sarsenov
2	DF	KAZ	Elzhas Sarbay
5	DF	KAZ	Demiyat Slambekov
6	DF	KAZ	Magzhan Baurzhan
7	MF	KAZ	Maksat Bayzhanov (Retired)
8	MF	KAZ	Bekzat Kurmanbekuly
10	FW	KAZ	Islam Abilkasov
15	FW	GUI	Mamadou Diallo (loan return to (Belarus) Energetik-BGU Minsk)
19	MF	KAZ	Amal Seitov
21	DF	KAZ	Elisey Gorshunov
22	DF	KAZ	Adilbek Zhumakhanov (loan return to (Kazakhstan) Atyrau)
25	DF	BLR	Artyom Dylevsky (to (Belarus) Smorgon)
35	GK	KAZ	Nikita Kalmykov (to (Kazakhstan) Maktaaral)
52	DF	KAZ	Konstantin Gorizanov
71	MF	BLR	Sergey Bondarenko
77	FW	KAZ	Nurbol Anuarbekov
89	MF	BLR	Kirill Sidorenko (to (Belarus) Dynamo Brest)

=== Kyzylzhar ===
In: Note: Flags indicate national team as defined under FIFA eligibility rules; some limited exceptions apply. Players may hold more than one non-FIFA nationality.

No.	Pos.	Nation	Player
3	DF	BLR	Nikita Naumov (from (Belarus) Dinamo Minsk)
5	MF	BRA	Rafael Sabino (from (Kazakhstan) Akzhayik)
10	FW	KAZ	Artem Cheredinov (loan return from (Kazakhstan) Zhenis)
21	MF	BIH	Mladen Veselinović (from (Bosnia and Herzegovina) Tuzla City)
25	GK	BLR	Raman Stsyapanaw (from (Belarus) Shakhtyor Soligorsk)
27	MF	BLR	Yevgeny Beryozkin (from (Belarus) Torpedo-BelAZ Zhodino)
28	DF	BEL	Bryan Van Den Bogaert (from (Iceland) KA)
55	DF	CRO	Ivan Graf (from (Kazakhstan) Shakhter Karagandy)
80	FW	GEO	Tamaz Makatsaria (from (Georgia (country)) Gagra)
—	DF	KAZ	Erasyl Seitkanov (loan return from (Kazakhstan) Zhenis)
—	FW	KAZ	Maksim Skorykh (loan return from (Kazakhstan) Zhenis)

Out: Note: Flags indicate national team as defined under FIFA eligibility rules; some limited exceptions apply. Players may hold more than one non-FIFA nationality.

No.	Pos.	Nation	Player
3	DF	RUS	Oleg Murachyov
4	DF	KAZ	Mark Gurman
5	DF	BLR	Valery Karshakevich (to (Kazakhstan) Spartak Semey)
9	FW	GEO	Elguja Lobjanidze (to (China) Meizhou Hakka)
10	MF	RUS	Pavel Yakovlev
12	MF	CIV	Moussa Koné
15	DF	KAZ	Dmitry Shmidt
18	MF	BLR	Sergey Tikhonovsky (to (Belarus) Slavia Mozyr)
19	MF	ARG	Pablo Podio
22	FW	GEO	Giorgi Ivaniadze
24	DF	KAZ	Daniel Melnichenko
28	MF	MNE	Darko Zorić
30	DF	KAZ	Sultan Baimagambetov
33	DF	CRO	Mateo Mužek (to (Armenia) Alashkert)
41	GK	RUS	Miroslav Lobantsev (to (Kazakhstan) Aktobe)
77	MF	RUS	Yevgeni Kozlov (to (Kazakhstan) Atyrau)
88	MF	BRA	Gian (to (Israel) Ironi Kiryat Shmona)
95	MF	BRA	Brandao (to (Brazil) Grêmio Prudente)

=== Maktaaral ===
In: Note: Flags indicate national team as defined under FIFA eligibility rules; some limited exceptions apply. Players may hold more than one non-FIFA nationality.

No.	Pos.	Nation	Player
1	GK	ARM	Aram Ayrapetyan (from (Kazakhstan) Atyrau)
3	DF	KAZ	Nurlan Dairov (from (Kazakhstan) Taraz)
4	DF	KAZ	Zhalgas Zhaksylykov (from (Kazakhstan) Taraz)
7	MF	ARM	Petros Avetisyan (from (Kazakhstan) Akzhayik)
11	FW	KAZ	Toktar Zhangylyshbay (from (Kazakhstan) Shakhter Karagandy)
12	MF	BRA	Victor Braga (from (Kazakhstan) Ordabasy)
13	DF	KAZ	Sagadat Tursynbay (from (Kazakhstan) Ordabasy)
19	MF	COL	Juan Sandoval (from (Lithuania) Atmosfera)
35	GK	KAZ	Nikita Kalmykov (from (Kazakhstan) Kaisar)
89	FW	COD	Junior Kabananga (from (Romania) Mioveni)
96	DF	BRA	Charleston (from (Hungary) Debreceni)
—	MF	KAZ	Adilkhan Dobay (from (Kazakhstan) Ordabasy)

Out: Note: Flags indicate national team as defined under FIFA eligibility rules; some limited exceptions apply. Players may hold more than one non-FIFA nationality.

No.	Pos.	Nation	Player
1	GK	UKR	Serhiy Litovchenko
2	DF	BLR	Aleksey Nosko (loan return to (Belarus) BATE Borisov)
7	MF	KAZ	Beknur Ryskul
11	DF	KAZ	Sagi Sovet (loan return to (Kazakhstan) Astana)
13	GK	KAZ	Ramil Nurmukhametov
17	MF	KAZ	Galymzhan Kenzhebek (loan return to (Kazakhstan) Kairat)
19	MF	KAZ	Bekzat Zhaksybayuly
22	DF	KAZ	Nurzhigit Smatov
23	DF	BLR	Pavel Chikida
26	MF	MDA	Artiom Rozgoniuc (to (Moldova) Petrocub Hîncești)
29	MF	BRA	Alex Bruno
34	DF	UKR	Artur Zapadnya (Retired)
53	MF	FRA	Billal Sebaihi (to (Lithuania) Žalgiris)
77	MF	KAZ	Jean-Ali Payruz
88	MF	CIV	Yao Léonard Djaha

=== Okzhetpes ===
In: Note: Flags indicate national team as defined under FIFA eligibility rules; some limited exceptions apply. Players may hold more than one non-FIFA nationality.

No.	Pos.	Nation	Player
4	DF	RUS	Aleksei Tatayev (from (Russia) Alania Vladikavkaz)
9	FW	KAZ	Shokhan Abzalov (from (Kazakhstan) Turan)
13	GK	KAZ	Nikita Chagrov (from (Iceland) Kórdrengir)
14	MF	KAZ	Samat Shamshi (from (Kazakhstan) Ordabasy)
16	MF	KAZ	Meyrambek Kalmyrza (from (Kazakhstan) Astana, previously on loan)
18	DF	KAZ	Sagi Sovet (on loan from (Kazakhstan) Astana)
20	MF	SRB	Srđan Dimitrov (from (Serbia) Mladost Novi Sad)
49	MF	BLR	Aleksandr Dzhigero (from (Belarus) Minsk)
93	DF	UKR	Ivan Tsyupa (from (Slovakia) Vranov nad Topľou)

Out: Note: Flags indicate national team as defined under FIFA eligibility rules; some limited exceptions apply. Players may hold more than one non-FIFA nationality.

No.	Pos.	Nation	Player
2	DF	KAZ	Anton Kuksin
3	DF	KAZ	Vladimir Sedelnikov
9	MF	KAZ	Timur Archakov
21	DF	KAZ	Askat Ermekuulu
22	MF	RUS	Guram Tetrashvili
23	MF	KAZ	Nurgaini Buribaev
24	MF	SRB	Milan Stojanović (to (Serbia) Radnik Surdulica)
31	GK	KAZ	Ruslan Abzhanov
74	DF	KAZ	Nikita Gubarev
71	FW	RUS	Taymuraz Toboyev
77	FW	KAZ	Miras Amantaev
99	FW	KAZ	Aleksandr Shimanskiy
—	MF	KAZ	Mukagali Pangerey (loan return to (Kazakhstan) Atyrau)

=== Ordabasy ===
In: Note: Flags indicate national team as defined under FIFA eligibility rules; some limited exceptions apply. Players may hold more than one non-FIFA nationality.

No.	Pos.	Nation	Player
5	DF	KAZ	Gafurzhan Suyumbayev (from (Kazakhstan) Aksu)
7	MF	UZB	Shokhboz Umarov (from (Belarus) BATE Borisov, previously on loan)
8	MF	KAZ	Askhat Tagybergen (from (Kazakhstan) Tobol)
9	MF	KAZ	Bauyrzhan Islamkhan
15	MF	SRB	Radosav Petrović (from (Spain) Real Zaragoza)
21	MF	KAZ	Yerkebulan Tungyshbayev (from (Kazakhstan) Aksu)
23	DF	KAZ	Temirlan Yerlanov (from (Kazakhstan) Aktobe)
25	DF	KAZ	Serhiy Malyi (from (Kazakhstan) Tobol)
26	DF	SEN	Mamadou Mbodj (from (Azerbaijan) Neftçi)
27	DF	CRO	Bernardo Matić (from (Croatia) HNK Šibenik)
45	FW	UZB	Bobur Abdikholikov (from (Belarus) Energetik-BGU Minsk)
47	MF	KAZ	Vladislav Vasilyev (from (Kazakhstan) Tobol)
74	GK	KAZ	Mukhammedzhan Seysen (from (Kazakhstan) Taraz)
96	DF	BRA	Auro Jr. (from (United States) Toronto)
99	FW	KAZ	Aybar Zhaksylykov (from (Kazakhstan) Tobol)
—	DF	KAZ	Nurali Mamirbaev (loan return to (Kazakhstan) Akademia Ontustik)
—	MF	KAZ	Asludin Khadzhiev (loan return to (Kazakhstan) Akademia Ontustik)
—	MF	KAZ	Maksim Vaganov (loan return from (Kazakhstan) Caspiy)

Out: Note: Flags indicate national team as defined under FIFA eligibility rules; some limited exceptions apply. Players may hold more than one non-FIFA nationality.

No.	Pos.	Nation	Player
9	MF	UKR	Oleksandr Batyshchev (to (Belarus) Torpedo-BelAZ Zhodino)
10	MF	KAZ	Elkhan Astanov (to (Kazakhstan) Astana)
12	MF	BRA	Victor Braga (to (Kazakhstan) Maktaaral)
13	DF	KAZ	Sagadat Tursynbay (to (Kazakhstan) Maktaaral)
17	FW	TOG	Serge Nyuiadzi (to (Thailand) Ratchaburi)
23	MF	KAZ	Adilkhan Dobay (to (Kazakhstan) Maktaaral)
99	MF	BRA	Luiz Guedes (to (Kazakhstan) Aksu)

=== Shakhter Karagandy ===
In: Note: Flags indicate national team as defined under FIFA eligibility rules; some limited exceptions apply. Players may hold more than one non-FIFA nationality.

No.	Pos.	Nation	Player
3	DF	GEO	Anton Tolordava
4	DF	KAZ	Viktor Dmitrenko (from (Kazakhstan) Caspiy)
6	DF	COL	Francisco Javier Mina
28	MF	KAZ	Yury Pertsukh (from (Kazakhstan) Astana)

Out: Note: Flags indicate national team as defined under FIFA eligibility rules; some limited exceptions apply. Players may hold more than one non-FIFA nationality.

No.	Pos.	Nation	Player
1	GK	KAZ	Igor Trofimets (to (Kazakhstan) Aksu)
3	DF	BLR	Aleksandr Poznyak (to (Belarus) Dinamo Minsk)
4	DF	KAZ	Tahir Nurseitov
5	DF	RUS	Temur Mustafin (to (Kyrgyzstan) Abdysh-Ata Kant)
11	DF	BIH	Đorđe Ćosić (to (Serbia) Mladost Novi Sad)
13	DF	KAZ	Miram Sapanov
17	MF	KAZ	Ibragim Dadaev (loan return to (Kazakhstan) Kairat)
20	FW	KAZ	Toktar Zhangylyshbay (to (Kazakhstan) Maktaaral)
21	MF	KGZ	Farkhat Musabekov (to (Kyrgyzstan) Abdysh-Ata Kant)
22	FW	UKR	Mykola Kovtalyuk
23	DF	MKD	Filip Gligorov (to (Kosovo) Ferizaj)
55	DF	CRO	Ivan Graf (to (Croatia) Kyzylzhar)
74	MF	KAZ	Kirill Lavrenyuk
98	FW	KAZ	Timur Muhametzhanov
99	FW	RUS	Yevgeni Kobzar

=== Tobol ===
In: Note: Flags indicate national team as defined under FIFA eligibility rules; some limited exceptions apply. Players may hold more than one non-FIFA nationality.

No.	Pos.	Nation	Player
6	MF	BIH	Jovan Ilic (from (Serbia) Novi Sad 1921)
11	FW	KAZ	Islam Chesnokov (from (Belarus) Belshina Bobruisk)
15	DF	RUS	Albert Gabarayev (from (Russia) Rodina Moscow)
17	DF	KAZ	Timur Zhakupov (from (Kazakhstan) Zhetysu)
18	MF	RUS	Pavel Kireyenko (from (Kazakhstan) Caspiy)
23	GK	RUS	Ivan Konovalov (from (Scotland) Livingston)
30	DF	SRB	Bojan Mlađović (from (Serbia) Mladost Novi Sad)
99	MF	BIH	Asmir Suljić (from (Bosnia and Herzegovina) Sarajevo)

Out: Note: Flags indicate national team as defined under FIFA eligibility rules; some limited exceptions apply. Players may hold more than one non-FIFA nationality.

No.	Pos.	Nation	Player
8	MF	KAZ	Askhat Tagybergen (to (Kazakhstan) Ordabasy)
11	MF	SRB	Zoran Tošić (to (Greece) PAS Lamia)
17	MF	KAZ	Vladislav Vasilyev (to (Kazakhstan) Ordabasy)
25	DF	KAZ	Serhiy Malyi (to (Kazakhstan) Ordabasy)
29	MF	SRB	Dušan Jovančić (to (Kazakhstan) Astana)
33	DF	MNE	Žarko Tomašević (to (Kazakhstan) Astana)
35	GK	KAZ	Aleksandr Mokin
44	FW	KAZ	Aybar Zhaksylykov (to (Kazakhstan) Ordabasy)
45	DF	MKD	Aleksa Amanović (to (Kazakhstan) Astana)
93	MF	NGA	Chidi Osuchukwu (to (Kazakhstan) Aksu)

=== Zhetysu ===
In: Note: Flags indicate national team as defined under FIFA eligibility rules; some limited exceptions apply. Players may hold more than one non-FIFA nationality.

No.	Pos.	Nation	Player
7	FW	KAZ	Aslan Adil (loan return from (Kazakhstan) Caspiy)
9	FW	BLR	Ruslan Teverov (from (Belarus) Vitebsk)
11	MF	GEO	Rati Ardazishvili (from (Kazakhstan) Caspiy)
18	FW	SRB	Jovan Stojanović
19	DF	BLR	Pavel Nazarenko (from (Kazakhstan) Akzhayik)
21	DF	CIV	Didier Kadio (from (Armenia) Alashkert)
24	MF	SRB	Nikola Cuckić (from (Kazakhstan) Caspiy)
25	DF	SRB	Danilo Aleksic (from (Serbia) Prva iskra Barič)
26	DF	ALG	Ilias Hassani
27	MF	GEO	Mate Tsintsadze (from (Georgia (country)) Torpedo Kutaisi)
30	DF	KAZ	Maksat Amirkhanov (from (Kazakhstan) Taraz)
77	MF	PLE	Fadi Zidan (from (Bahrain) Al-Hidd)
86	GK	KAZ	Andrey Shabanov

Out: Note: Flags indicate national team as defined under FIFA eligibility rules; some limited exceptions apply. Players may hold more than one non-FIFA nationality.

No.	Pos.	Nation	Player
1	GK	KAZ	Gleb Malinovsky
4	DF	KAZ	Maxim Chalkin
7	MF	KAZ	Beric Shaikhov
11	FW	KAZ	Aleksey Mikhaylov
13	FW	KAZ	Muhammad Eleusov
15	MF	KAZ	Kalizhan Ilyasov
19	MF	KAZ	Aibar Aidarbeculy
21	MF	UKR	Ivan Brikner (to (Kazakhstan) Kyzylzhar)
24	GK	KAZ	Vleri Kaznacheev
25	DF	RUS	Mikhail Mishchenko
27	MF	KAZ	Paul Kriventsev
28	MF	KAZ	Maksim Gladchenko
30	FW	KAZ	Diaz Kalybaev
66	DF	KAZ	Timur Zhakupov
71	DF	KAZ	Yeldos Maratov
—	MF	RUS	Marat Burayev

== Kazakhstan First League 2023 ==
=== Akzhayik ===
In: Note: Flags indicate national team as defined under FIFA eligibility rules; some limited exceptions apply. Players may hold more than one non-FIFA nationality.

No.	Pos.	Nation	Player

Out: Note: Flags indicate national team as defined under FIFA eligibility rules; some limited exceptions apply. Players may hold more than one non-FIFA nationality.

No.	Pos.	Nation	Player
—	GK	UKR	Kostyantyn Makhnovskyi

=== Taras ===
In: Note: Flags indicate national team as defined under FIFA eligibility rules; some limited exceptions apply. Players may hold more than one non-FIFA nationality.

No.	Pos.	Nation	Player

Out: Note: Flags indicate national team as defined under FIFA eligibility rules; some limited exceptions apply. Players may hold more than one non-FIFA nationality.

No.	Pos.	Nation	Player
79	FW	UKR	Maksym Dehtyarov
