= List of Kazakhstan football transfers summer 2023 =

This is a list of Kazakh football transfers during the 2023 summer transfer window.

== Kazakhstan Premier League 2023 ==
=== Aksu ===
In: Note: Flags indicate national team as defined under FIFA eligibility rules; some limited exceptions apply. Players may hold more than one non-FIFA nationality.

No.	Pos.	Nation	Player
3	DF	SRB	Marko Nikolić
6	DF	HAI	Alex Junior (from (Georgia (country)) Telavi)
7	MF	CPV	Mailson Lima (from Ararat-Armenia)
77	MF	KAZ	Aslanbek Kakimov
87	GK	RUS	Arsen Siukayev (from (Russia) Spartak Nalchik)
92	MF	RUS	Yevgeni Kobzar (from (Kazakhstan) Akzhayik)
95	MF	GHA	David Mawutor

Out: Note: Flags indicate national team as defined under FIFA eligibility rules; some limited exceptions apply. Players may hold more than one non-FIFA nationality.

No.	Pos.	Nation	Player
2	DF	KAZ	Yeldos Akhmetov (Retired)
3	DF	RUS	Islam Zhilov (to (Russia) Kuban Krasnodar)
6	MF	KAZ	Sultan Sagnayev (loan return to (Kazakhstan) Astana)
7	MF	GNB	Toni Silva (to (Kuwait) Kazma)
9	FW	BRA	Luiz Guedes (to (Malta) Hibernians)
14	MF	POR	Gilson Costa
25	DF	KAZ	Ruslan Yesimov (Retired)
40	MF	KGZ	Kayrat Zhyrgalbek uulu (to (Kyrgyzstan) Abdysh-Ata Kant)
77	MF	UKR	Artur Murza (to (Austria) Kapfenberger SV)
87	MF	KAZ	Zhaslan Kairkenov
89	GK	BLR	Alyaksandr Hutar (to (Belarus) BATE Borisov)

=== Aktobe ===
In: Note: Flags indicate national team as defined under FIFA eligibility rules; some limited exceptions apply. Players may hold more than one non-FIFA nationality.

No.	Pos.	Nation	Player
2	DF	KAZ	Timur Rudoselsky (from (Armenia) Alashkert)
3	MF	BLR	Dmitry Bessmertny (from (Belarus) BATE Borisov)
20	FW	BRA	China (from (United Arab Emirates) Dibba Al Fujairah)
66	MF	ISR	Ihab Ganayem (from (Israel) Bnei Sakhnin)
99	FW	RUS	Roman Izotov (from (Russia) Arsenal-2 Tula)

Out: Note: Flags indicate national team as defined under FIFA eligibility rules; some limited exceptions apply. Players may hold more than one non-FIFA nationality.

No.	Pos.	Nation	Player
11	FW	FRA	Hugo Vidémont
17	FW	RUS	Idris Umayev (loan return to (Russia) Akhmat Grozny)
23	DF	RUS	Daniil Penchikov (loan return to (Russia) Pari NN)
44	MF	LTU	Artūras Žulpa
57	MF	KAZ	Islam Amangali

=== Astana ===
In: Note: Flags indicate national team as defined under FIFA eligibility rules; some limited exceptions apply. Players may hold more than one non-FIFA nationality.

No.	Pos.	Nation	Player
6	DF	KAZ	Yan Vorogovsky (from (Belgium) RWD Molenbeek)
22	DF	KAZ	Aleksandr Marochkin (from (Kazakhstan) Tobol)
44	MF	BIH	Stjepan Lončar (on loan from (Hungary) Ferencváros)

Out: Note: Flags indicate national team as defined under FIFA eligibility rules; some limited exceptions apply. Players may hold more than one non-FIFA nationality.

No.	Pos.	Nation	Player
30	MF	SRB	Igor Ivanović (on loan to (Kazakhstan) Tobol)
—	MF	KAZ	Sultan Sagnayev (on loan to (Kazakhstan) Maktaaral, previously on loan to (Kazakhstan) Aksu)

=== Atyrau ===
In: Note: Flags indicate national team as defined under FIFA eligibility rules; some limited exceptions apply. Players may hold more than one non-FIFA nationality.

No.	Pos.	Nation	Player
19	MF	KAZ	Gevorg Najaryan (from (Armenia) Van)
29	MF	MKD	Florijan Kadriu (from (Albania) Erzeni)
63	MF	TJK	Fatkhullo Olimzoda (from (Tajikistan) Ravshan Kulob)
79	FW	UKR	Maksym Dehtyarov

Out: Note: Flags indicate national team as defined under FIFA eligibility rules; some limited exceptions apply. Players may hold more than one non-FIFA nationality.

No.	Pos.	Nation	Player
3	DF	KAZ	Ravil Ibragimov
23	DF	KAZ	Amandyk Nabikhanov
29	FW	KAZ	Mukagali Pangerey
79	FW	UKR	Maksym Dehtyarov

=== Caspiy ===
In: Note: Flags indicate national team as defined under FIFA eligibility rules; some limited exceptions apply. Players may hold more than one non-FIFA nationality.

No.	Pos.	Nation	Player
8	FW	BLR	Ilya Chernyak (from (Belarus) Shakhtyor Soligorsk)
9	FW	RUS	Mikhail Chernomyrdin (from (Russia) Zenit-2 St.Petersburg)
11	MF	ARM	Solomon Udo (from Ararat-Armenia)
27	MF	ALB	Shqiprim Taipi (from (Albania) Kukësi)
34	DF	SVN	Žiga Ovsenek (from (Slovenia) Tabor Sežana)
91	FW	SRB	Filip Avric (from (Serbia) Rad)
92	FW	KAZ	Almas Armenov

Out: Note: Flags indicate national team as defined under FIFA eligibility rules; some limited exceptions apply. Players may hold more than one non-FIFA nationality.

No.	Pos.	Nation	Player
8	MF	LTU	Vilius Armanavičius (to (Lithuania) Kauno Žalgiris)
9	MF	GEO	Jaba Jighauri (to (Uzbekistan) Nasaf)
11	MF	KAZ	Duman Narzildayev (to (Kazakhstan) Ordabasy)
13	DF	BLR	Aleksey Zalesky (to (Belarus) Torpedo-BelAZ Zhodino)
14	FW	GEO	Giorgi Pantsulaia (to (Georgia (country)) Torpedo Kutaisi)
18	GK	KAZ	Sultanbek Dosakhanov
19	FW	BLR	Dmitry Podstrelov (to (Belarus) BATE Borisov)
21	MF	SEN	Abdoulaye Diakate
35	GK	KGZ	Erzhan Tokotayev (to (Turkey) Şanlıurfaspor)
91	MF	POR	Rúben Brígido
99	FW	RUS	Stanislav Krapukhin

=== Kairat ===
In: Note: Flags indicate national team as defined under FIFA eligibility rules; some limited exceptions apply. Players may hold more than one non-FIFA nationality.

No.	Pos.	Nation	Player
3	DF	CMR	Macky Bagnack (loan return from (Russia) Pari Nizhny Novgorod)
17	FW	KAZ	Bayzhan Madelkhan (loan return from (Russia) Murom)

Out: Note: Flags indicate national team as defined under FIFA eligibility rules; some limited exceptions apply. Players may hold more than one non-FIFA nationality.

No.	Pos.	Nation	Player
7	MF	KGZ	Gulzhigit Alykulov (to (Belarus) Neman Grodno)

=== Kaisar ===
In: Note: Flags indicate national team as defined under FIFA eligibility rules; some limited exceptions apply. Players may hold more than one non-FIFA nationality.

No.	Pos.	Nation	Player

Out: Note: Flags indicate national team as defined under FIFA eligibility rules; some limited exceptions apply. Players may hold more than one non-FIFA nationality.

No.	Pos.	Nation	Player
19	MF	KAZ	Ayan Kulmaganbetov
23	DF	GNB	Prosper Mendy (to (Belgium) Olympic Charleroi)

=== Kyzylzhar ===
In: Note: Flags indicate national team as defined under FIFA eligibility rules; some limited exceptions apply. Players may hold more than one non-FIFA nationality.

No.	Pos.	Nation	Player
10	FW	MNE	Boris Smiljanić
13	FW	UKR	Dmytro Khlyobas (from (Armenia) Urartu)
89	DF	MNE	Darko Bulatović (from (Albania) Vllaznia Shkodër)
—	FW	MNE	Boris Cmiljanić (from (Montenegro) Dečić)

Out: Note: Flags indicate national team as defined under FIFA eligibility rules; some limited exceptions apply. Players may hold more than one non-FIFA nationality.

No.	Pos.	Nation	Player
5	MF	BRA	Rafael Sabino
10	FW	KAZ	Artem Cheredinov (to (Kazakhstan) Zhenis)
28	DF	BEL	Bryan Van Den Bogaert
30	FW	GEO	Tamaz Makatsaria (to (Kazakhstan) Zhenis)
98	FW	BRA	Pernambuco (to (Hungary) Diósgyőri)

=== Maktaaral ===
In: Note: Flags indicate national team as defined under FIFA eligibility rules; some limited exceptions apply. Players may hold more than one non-FIFA nationality.

No.	Pos.	Nation	Player
6	MF	GEO	Lasha Parunashvili (from (Georgia (country)) Saburtalo Tbilisi)
7	FW	TOG	Serge Nyuiadzi (from (Thailand) Ratchaburi)
8	FW	BLR	Anton Shramchenko (from (Belarus) Shakhtyor Soligorsk)
53	MF	FRA	Billal Sebaihi (from (Lithuania) Žalgiris)
70	MF	KAZ	Sultan Sagnayev (on loan from (Kazakhstan) Astana)
—	DF	BLR	Uladzislaw Kasmynin (from (Uzbekistan) Metallurg Bekabad)

Out: Note: Flags indicate national team as defined under FIFA eligibility rules; some limited exceptions apply. Players may hold more than one non-FIFA nationality.

No.	Pos.	Nation	Player
7	MF	ARM	Petros Avetisyan (to (Russia) Khimki)
8	MF	CIV	Sékou Doumbia (to (Israel) Maccabi Herzliya)
17	MF	KAZ	Dauren Zhumat (to (Kazakhstan) Okzhetpes)
19	MF	COL	Juan Sandoval (to (Kazakhstan) Turan)
48	MF	CIV	Shada Ouedraogo
89	FW	COD	Junior Kabananga

=== Okzhetpes ===
In: Note: Flags indicate national team as defined under FIFA eligibility rules; some limited exceptions apply. Players may hold more than one non-FIFA nationality.

No.	Pos.	Nation	Player
71	MF	KAZ	Dauren Zhumat (from (Kazakhstan) Maktaaral)
94	FW	BIH	Benjamin Tatar (from (Bosnia and Herzegovina) Borac Banja Luka)

Out: Note: Flags indicate national team as defined under FIFA eligibility rules; some limited exceptions apply. Players may hold more than one non-FIFA nationality.

No.	Pos.	Nation	Player
44	MF	UKR	Ivan Brikner
49	MF	BLR	Aleksandr Dzhigero (to (Belarus) Slavia Mozyr)

=== Ordabasy ===
In: Note: Flags indicate national team as defined under FIFA eligibility rules; some limited exceptions apply. Players may hold more than one non-FIFA nationality.

No.	Pos.	Nation	Player
6	MF	KAZ	Duman Narzildayev (from (Kazakhstan) Caspiy)
19	MF	UKR	Yevhenii Makarenko (from (Hungary) Fehérvár)
41	FW	UKR	Artem Biesiedin (from (Ukraine) Dynamo Kyiv)

Out: Note: Flags indicate national team as defined under FIFA eligibility rules; some limited exceptions apply. Players may hold more than one non-FIFA nationality.

No.	Pos.	Nation	Player
15	MF	SRB	Radosav Petrović (to (Cyprus) APOEL)
19	MF	KAZ	Zikrillo Sultaniyazov

=== Shakhter Karagandy ===
In: Note: Flags indicate national team as defined under FIFA eligibility rules; some limited exceptions apply. Players may hold more than one non-FIFA nationality.

No.	Pos.	Nation	Player
5	DF	BIH	Đorđe Ćosić (from (Serbia) Mladost Novi Sad)
33	MF	KAZ	Dinmukhammed Kashken (from (Lithuania) Žalgiris)

Out: Note: Flags indicate national team as defined under FIFA eligibility rules; some limited exceptions apply. Players may hold more than one non-FIFA nationality.

No.	Pos.	Nation	Player
20	MF	KAZ	Ibragim Dadaev (to (Kazakhstan) Khan-Tengri)
43	MF	KAZ	Ualikhan Mukhametzhanov

=== Tobol ===
In: Note: Flags indicate national team as defined under FIFA eligibility rules; some limited exceptions apply. Players may hold more than one non-FIFA nationality.

No.	Pos.	Nation	Player
13	MF	BLR	Pavel Zabelin (from (Belarus) Shakhtyor Soligorsk)
19	FW	BIH	Momčilo Mrkaić (from (Bosnia and Herzegovina) Borac Banja Luka)
70	MF	SRB	Igor Ivanović (on loan from (Kazakhstan) Astana)
90	MF	UKR	Yevhen Shakhov (from (Ukraine) Zorya Luhansk)
97	MF	KAZ	Ruslan Valiullin

Out: Note: Flags indicate national team as defined under FIFA eligibility rules; some limited exceptions apply. Players may hold more than one non-FIFA nationality.

No.	Pos.	Nation	Player
20	MF	KAZ	Ramazan Orazov (to (Slovenia) Koper)
22	DF	KAZ	Aleksandr Marochkin (to (Kazakhstan) Astana)
77	FW	UZB	Igor Sergeyev (to (Thailand) BG Pathum United)
88	GK	RUS	Timur Akmurzin (to (Russia) Veles Moscow)
99	MF	BIH	Asmir Suljić (to (Bosnia and Herzegovina) Velež Mostar)

=== Zhetysu ===
In: Note: Flags indicate national team as defined under FIFA eligibility rules; some limited exceptions apply. Players may hold more than one non-FIFA nationality.

No.	Pos.	Nation	Player
3	DF	RUS	Layonel Adams (from (Tajikistan) Khujand)
18	FW	SRB	Anes Rušević (from (North Macedonia) Rabotnički)
25	MF	UKR	Ivan Brikner (from (Kazakhstan) Okzhetpes)
71	GK	RUS	Sergei Revyakin (from (Armenia) Ararat Yerevan)
77	DF	SRB	Aleksandar Ješić (from (Serbia) Mladost Lučani)
88	MF	CIV	Moussa Bakayoko (from (Armenia) Shirak)

Out: Note: Flags indicate national team as defined under FIFA eligibility rules; some limited exceptions apply. Players may hold more than one non-FIFA nationality.

No.	Pos.	Nation	Player
6	DF	KAZ	Erbolat Rustemov
9	FW	BLR	Ruslan Teverov (to (Belarus) Vitebsk)
11	MF	GEO	Rati Ardazishvili
15	FW	KAZ	Bauyrzhan Turysbek (to (Kazakhstan) Khan Tengri)
18	FW	SRB	Jovan Stojanović
25	DF	SRB	Danilo Aleksic (to (Serbia) Rad)
26	MF	ALG	Ilias Hassani
35	GK	KAZ	Ramil Nurmukhametov
77	FW	PLE	Fadi Zidan (to (Israel) Kafr Qasim)
