= 2022 Kazakhstan First Division =

Kazakhstan First Division
- Season: 2022
- Matches: 49
- Goals: 141 (2.88 per match)
- Top goalscorer: Mamadou Diallo (5)

The 2022 Kazakhstan First Division is the 28th edition of Kazakhstan First Division, the second-level football competition in Kazakhstan.

== Teams ==
=== Stadia and locations ===
Locations of teams in the 2022 Kazakhstan First Division

Team	Location	Venue	Capacity
Academy Ontustik	Shymkent	BIIK Stadium	
Astana M	Nur-Sultan	Astana Arena	
Baikonur	Kyzylorda	Gani Muratbayev Stadium	
Ekibastuz	Ekibastuz	Shakhter Stadium	
Igilik	Karatau		
Kairat-Zhastar	Almaty	Central Stadium	
Kaisar	Kyzylorda	Gani Muratbayev Stadium	
Kyran	Shymkent	Lokomotive Stadium	
Okzhetpes	Kokshetau	Okzhetpes Stadium	
Shakhter-Bulat	Temirtau	Metallurg Stadium	
Taraz-Karatau	Taraz	Central Stadium	
Yassy	Shymkent	Kazhymukan Munaitpasov Stadium	
Zhenis	Nur-Sultan	Kazhymukan Munaitpasov Stadium	
Zhetysu	Taldykorgan	Zhetysu Stadium	

=== Personnel and kits ===
Note: Flags indicate national team as has been defined under FIFA eligibility rules. Players and Managers may hold more than one non-FIFA nationality.

Team	Manager	Captain	Kit manufacturer	Shirt sponsor
Academy Ontustik	(Kazakhstan) Kuanysh Karakulov			
Astana M	(Kazakhstan) Konstantin Kotov			
Baikonur	(Kazakhstan) Kanat Sherimbetov			-
Ekibastuz	(Kazakhstan) Vitaly Sparyshev			
Igilik	(Kazakhstan) Artur Avakyants			
Kairat-Zhastar	(Kazakhstan) Kirill Morunov			
Kaisar	(Kazakhstan) Sultan Abildayev			
Kyran	(Kazakhstan) Nurkal Satybaldiev			
Okzhetpes	(Kazakhstan) Sergey Popkov			
Shakhter-Bulat	(Kazakhstan) Igor Soloshenko			
Taraz-Karatau	(Kazakhstan) Sergey Pak			
Yassy	(Kazakhstan) Yerlan Shoitymov			
Zhenis	(Kazakhstan) Rinat Aldatov			
Zhetysu	(Kazakhstan) Kalmukhamet Donsebaev			

=== Foreign players ===
Club	Player 1	Player 2	Player 3	Player 4	Player 5	Player 6	Player 7	Player 8	Player 9	EAEU Players	Former Players
Academy Ontustik											
Astana M											
Baikonur											
Ekibastuz											
Igilik											
Kairat-Zhastar											
Kaisar	(Brazil) João Pedro Oliveira	(Guinea) Mamadou Diallo								(Belarus) Sergey Bondarenko (Belarus) Artem Dylevskiy (Belarus) Kiryl Sidarenka	
Kyran										(Armenia) Garegin Kirakosyan (Russia) Temuri Bukiya (Russia) Tamirlan Dzhamalutdinov (Russia) Igor Gubanov (Russia) Khalid Shakhtiev (Russia) Taymuraz Toboyev (Uzbekistan) Javokhir Esonkulov (Uzbekistan) **Alibobo Rakhmatullaev**	
Okzhetpes	(Serbia) Milan Stojanović	(Ukraine) Maksym Drachenko	(Ukraine) Dmytro Ryzhuk							(Russia) Ruslan Bolov (Russia) Vyacheslav Grab	
Shakhter-Bulat											
Taraz-Karatau											
Yassy	(Cameroon) Landry Nzimen									(Uzbekistan) Iskandar Kholmurzaev	
Zhenis											
Zhetysu	(Nigeria) Stanley	(Ukraine) Ivan Brikner	(Ukraine) Yevhen Chepurnenko							(Russia) Mikhail Mishchenko (Russia) Aslanbek Sikoyev	

In bold: Players that have been capped for their national team.

== Regular season ==
=== League table ===
Pos	Team	Pld	W	D	L	GF	GA	GD	Pts	Qualification or relegation
1	Okzhetpes (C, P)	26	19	4	3	80	22	+58	61	Promotion to the Kazakhstan Premier League
2	Kaisar (P)	26	17	5	4	60	26	+34	56	Promotion to the Kazakhstan Premier League
3	Zhetysu (P)	26	17	4	5	57	23	+34	52	Promotion to the Kazakhstan Premier League
4	Kairat-Zhastar	26	15	6	5	61	31	+30	51	
5	Kyran	26	12	5	9	57	43	+14	41	
6	Ekibastuz	26	9	10	7	45	47	−2	37	
7	Taraz-Karatau	26	10	6	10	45	47	−2	36	
8	Zhenis	26	10	5	11	40	36	+4	35	
9	Yassy	26	10	5	11	48	54	−6	35	
10	Academy Ontustik	26	8	6	12	42	60	−18	30	
11	Astana M	26	7	6	13	50	62	−12	27	
12	Igilik	26	6	3	17	27	70	−43	21	
13	Shakhter-Bulat	26	4	5	17	36	72	−36	17	
14	Baikonur	26	1	4	21	16	71	−55	7	

Source: Soccerway, https://soccertoday.co/competition/kazakhstan-first-division-2022/ SoccerToday
Rules for classification: 1) Points; 2) Goal difference; 3) Matches won; 4) Goals scored; 5) Away goals scored; 6) Head-to-head points; 7) Head-to-head matches won; 8) Head-to-head goal difference; 9) Head-to-head goals scored; 10) Head-to-head away goals scored; 11) Draw.
(C) Champions; (P) Promoted

==== Results by match played ====
Team ╲ Round	1	2	3	4	5	6	7	8	9	10	11	12	13	14	15	16
Academy Ontustik	L	W	L	L	L	L	D	W	L	W	D	W	W	W	W	
Astana M	D	L	W	L	D	W	W	D	L	L	L	W	W	L		
Baikonur	L	L	L	L	L	L	L	L	L	L	L	L	L	D	D	
Ekibastuz	D	D	D	L	W	W	D	W	D	W	D	L	L	W	L	
Igilik	D	L	L	W	L	W	L	W	L	L	L	L	L	L		
Kairat-Zhastar	D	W	D	W	D	L	D	W	W	D	W	L	L	W	W	
Kaisar	W	W	W	W	D	W	W	W	D	L	W	L	L	W		
Kyran	D	W	W	W	W	D	L	W	W	L	W	W	W	D	L	
Okzhetpes	W	W	W	W	L	L	W	D	W	W	W	W	W	D		
Taraz-Karatau	D	D	W	D	D	W	W	D	W	W	L	L	W	L	D	L
Shakhter-Bulat	L	L	L	L	W	L	L	L	L	D	D	W	L	L	L	L
Yassy	D	L	W	W	W	D	L	L	D	W	W	L	L	W		
Zhenis	D	L	L	D	D	L	W	L	W	W	D	W	W	D	W	W
Zhetysu	W	W	L	L	D	W	D	L	W	L	L	W	W			

Updated to match(es) played on 28 May 2022. Source:
W = Win; D = Draw; L = Loss; P = Postponed

== Statistics ==
=== Scoring ===
==== Top scorers ====
As of matches played on 6 July 2022

Rank	Player	Club	Goals
1	(Guinea) Mamadou Diallo	Kaisar	8
2	(Ukraine) Yevhen Chepurnenko	Zhetysu	6
3	(Kazakhstan) Sanat Zhumakhanov	Okzhetpes	5
3	(Russia) Ruslan Bolov	Okzhetpes	5
4	(Kazakhstan) Nurdaulet Agzambaev	Kyzylzhar	4
