= 2016 Kazakhstan First Division =

Kazakhstan First Division
- Season: 2016
- Champions: Kaisar
- Promoted: Kaisar, Altai Semey

The 2016 Kazakhstan First Division was the 22nd edition of Kazakhstan First Division, the second-level football competition in Kazakhstan.

== Teams ==
=== Stadia and locations ===
Locations of teams in the 2016 Kazakhstan Premier League

Club	Kit sponsor
Altay	Adidas
Baikonur	Umbro
Bayterek	Legea
Bolat	Adidas
Caspiy	Saller
Ekibastuz	Joma
Kaisar	Nike
Kyran	Jako
Kyzylzhar	Nike
Makhtaaral	Adidas

== Regular season ==
=== Regular season table ===
Pos	Team	Pld	W	D	L	GF	GA	GD	Pts	Qualification
1	Kaisar	18	12	6	0	32	5	+27	42	Qualification for the championship round
2	Altai Semey	18	12	5	1	32	7	+25	41	Qualification for the championship round
3	Kyzylzhar	18	10	6	2	34	14	+20	36	Qualification for the championship round
4	Maktaaral	18	8	6	4	21	16	+5	30	Qualification for the championship round
5	Ekibastuz	18	8	5	5	13	11	+2	29	Qualification for the championship round
6	Caspiy	18	8	4	6	28	16	+12	28	Qualification for the championship round
7	Kyran	18	8	1	9	24	20	+4	25	Qualification for the relegation round
8	Bolat	18	3	2	13	15	31	−16	11	Qualification for the relegation round
9	Baikonur	18	2	1	15	11	46	−35	7	Qualification for the relegation round
10	Bayterek	18	1	0	17	9	53	−44	3	Qualification for the relegation round

Source: Soccerway
Rules for classification: 1) Points; 2) Head-to-head points; 3) Head-to-head matches won; 4) Head-to-head goal difference; 5) Head-to-head goals scored; 6) Head-to-head away goals scored; 7) Goal difference; 8) Matches won; 9) Goals scored; 10) Away goals scored; 11) Draw.

=== Regular season results ===
Home \ Away	ALT	BAI	BAY	BOL	CAS	EKB	KSR	KYR	KYZ	MAK
Altai Semey										
Baikonur										
Bayterek										
Bolat										
Caspiy										
Ekibastuz										
Kaisar										
Kyran										
Kyzylzhar										
Maktaaral										

Source: Soccerway
Legend: Blue = home team win; Yellow = draw; Red = away team win.

== Championship round ==
=== Championship round table ===
Pos	Team	Pld	W	D	L	GF	GA	GD	Pts	Qualification
1	Kaisar (C, P)	28	20	7	1	49	9	+40	67	Promotion to the Kazakhstan Premier League
2	Altai Semey (Q, P)	28	17	7	4	49	17	+32	58	Qualification for the promotion play-offs
3	Kyzylzhar	28	14	9	5	45	25	+20	51	
4	Caspiy	28	12	7	9	38	29	+9	43	
5	Maktaaral	28	11	8	9	31	31	0	41	
6	Ekibastuz	28	8	6	14	17	27	−10	30	

Source: Soccerway
Rules for classification: 1) Points; 2) Play-off (only if deciding champion when two teams are tied); 3) Head-to-head points; 4) Head-to-head matches won; 5) Head-to-head goal difference; 6) Head-to-head goals scored; 7) Head-to-head away goals scored; 8) Goal difference; 9) Matches won; 10) Goals scored; 11) Away goals scored; 12) Draw.
(C) Champions; (P) Promoted; (Q) Qualified for the phase indicated

=== Championship round results ===
Home \ Away	ALT	CAS	EKB	KSR	KYZ	MAK
Altai Semey		5–0	1–0	1–0	0–1	2–3
Caspiy	1–1		1–0	0–2	0–0	3–0
Ekibastuz	0–2	1–2		0–1	0–1	0–0
Kaisar	1–0	4–2	2–0		2–0	1–0
Kyzylzhar	2–2	0–1	4–2	1–1		1–0
Maktaaral	2–3	0–0	2–1	0–3	3–1	

Source: Soccerway
Legend: Blue = home team win; Yellow = draw; Red = away team win.

== Relegation round ==
=== Relegation round table ===
Pos	Team	Pld	W	D	L	GF	GA	GD	Pts
7	Kyran	24	11	1	12	31	26	+5	34
8	Bolat	24	5	4	15	23	37	−14	19
9	Baikonur	24	4	2	18	17	54	−37	14
10	Bayterek	24	4	1	19	17	62	−45	13

Source: Soccerway
Rules for classification: 1) Points; 2) Head-to-head points; 3) Head-to-head matches won; 4) Head-to-head goal difference; 5) Head-to-head goals scored; 6) Head-to-head away goals scored; 7) Goal difference; 8) Matches won; 9) Goals scored; 10) Away goals scored; 11) Draw.

=== Relegation round results ===
Home \ Away	BAI	BAY	BOL	KYR
Baikonur		3–4	0–0	0–2
Bayterek	1–0		0–3	0–2
Bolat	1–2	1–1		2–1
Kyran	0–1	0–2	2–1	

Source: Soccerway
Legend: Blue = home team win; Yellow = draw; Red = away team win.

== Promotion play-offs ==
5 November 2016	Taraz	0–3	Altai Semey	Astana
14:00 (UTC+6)		Report	Shakin 4'; Shaff 45' (pen.); Nurgaliyev 51'	Stadium: Astana Arena; Attendance: 2,500; Referee: Artyom Kuchin

Altai Semey were promoted to the 2017 Kazakhstan Premier League; Taraz were relegated to the 2017 Kazakhstan First Division.
