= FC Baikonur =

Kazakhstani football club

- Full name: Football Club Baikonur; Байқоңыр Футбол Клубы
- Founded: 2015
- Dissolved: 2023
- Ground: Gani Muratbayev Stadium; Kyzylorda, Kazakhstan
- Capacity: 30,000
- Chairman: Tugizbayev Ruslan
- Manager: Zharkynbek Zholamanov
- 2022: 14th
Home colours

FC Baikonur (Kazakh: Байқоңыр Футбол Клубы) was a Kazakh football club based at the Lokomotiv Arena in Kyzylorda.

The club has dissolved after the 2022 season.

== Final squad ==
Note: Flags indicate national team as defined under FIFA eligibility rules; some limited exceptions apply. Players may hold more than one non-FIFA nationality.

No.	Pos.	Nation	Player
35	GK	KAZ	Chingiz Tanatkanov
16	GK	KAZ	Salaydin Nurimzhan
1	GK	KAZ	Eradil Tileuov
33	DF	KAZ	Murat Yskakov
3	DF	KAZ	Tolegenov Abylaykhan
15	DF	KAZ	Kemaluly Kuanysh
—	DF	KAZ	Yerbolat Serik
—	DF	KAZ	Yerbolat Rustemov
—	DF	KAZ	Bolat Tynybek
—	MF	KAZ	Arman Dosmanbet
9	MF	KAZ	Samat Balymbetov

No.	Pos.	Nation	Player
23	MF	KAZ	Ayazhan Ajdos
—	MF	KAZ	Kenzheahmet Ybyraev
—	MF	KAZ	Ashat Karabek
—	MF	KAZ	Medet Tolegenuly
—	MF	KAZ	Demiyat Slambekov
—	MF	KAZ	Maksat Taikenov
—	MF	KAZ	Aidar Khusnadinov
10	FW	KAZ	Dastan Duysembayev
—	FW	KAZ	Daniyar Dauletbayev
—	FW	KAZ	Zhomart Zhumabaev
