= Đorđe Ćosić =

Bosnian footballer (born 1995)

Personal information
- Date of birth: 11 September 1995 (age 31)
- Place of birth: Sarajevo, Bosnia and Herzegovina
- Height: 1.87 m (6 ft 2 in)
- Position: Centre-back

Team information
- Current team: Radnik Bijeljina
- Number: 26

Senior career*
Years	Team	Apps	(Gls)
2015–2016	Zvijezda 09		
2016–2017	Drina Zvornik	30	(1)
2017–2018	Zrinjski Mostar	0	(0)
2017–2018	→ Vitez (loan)	18	(0)
2018–2021	Borac Banja Luka	76	(3)
2022–2023	Shakhter Karagandy	22	(1)
2023	Mladost Novi Sad	17	(0)
2023	Shakhter Karagandy	7	(0)
2024	Tuzla City	13	(0)
2024-2025	Vardar	18	(0)
2025–	Radnik Bijeljina	43	(1)
- * Club domestic league appearances and goals as of 31 October 2026

Đorđe Ćosić (born 11 September 1995) is a Bosnian professional footballer who plays as a centre-back for Bosnian Premier League club Radnik Bijeljina.

== Career ==
He started his senior career in Zvijezda 09, for which he performed in Second League of RS, and then in First League of RS. Then he played in Drina Zvornik. He also performed for Vitez, before he signed a contract with Borac Banja Luka. He left the club in September 2021. The following year he performed for Shakhter Karagandy, at the beginning of 2023 he became a member of Mladost Novi Sad.

== Career statistics ==
As of match played 31 October 2026

Appearances and goals by club, season and competition
Club	Season	League			National cup (Note: Includes Bosnian Cup, Kazakhstan Cup, Serbian Cup, Macedonian Cup)		Continental		Total	
Club	Season	Division	Apps	Goals	Apps	Goals	Apps	Goals	Apps	Goals
Drina Zvornik	2016–17	First League of RS	30	1	1	0	—		31	1
Vitez (loan)	2017–18	Bosnian Premier League	18	0	2	0	—		20	0
Borac Banja Luka	2018–19	First League of RS	24	1	4	0	—		28	1
Borac Banja Luka	2019–20	Bosnian Premier League	22	0	1	0	—		23	0
Borac Banja Luka	2020–21	Bosnian Premier League	25	1	4	0	2 (Note: Appearances in UEFA Europa League)	0	31	1
Borac Banja Luka	2021–22	Bosnian Premier League	5	1	—		4 (Note: Two appearances in UEFA Champions League, two appearances in UEFA Conference League)	0	9	1
Borac Banja Luka	Total		76	3	9	0	6	0	91	3
Shakhter Karagandy	2022	Kazakhstan Premier League	22	1	6	0	—		28	1
Mladost Novi Sad	2022–23	Serbian SuperLiga	17	0	—		—		17	0
Shakhter Karagandy	2023	Kazakhstan Premier League	7	0	—		—		7	0
Tuzla City	2023–24	Bosnian Premier League	13	0	1	0	—		14	0
Vardar	2024–25	Macedonian First League	18	0	2	0	—		20	0
Radnik Bijeljina	2025–26	Bosnian Premier League	32	0	3	0	—		35	0
Radnik Bijeljina	2026–27	Bosnian Premier League	11	1	1	0	—		12	1
Radnik Bijeljina	Total		43	1	4	0	—		47	1
Career total			244	6	25	0	6	0	275	6

== Honours ==
Borac Banja Luka

- Bosnian Premier League: 2020–21
