= Artyom Dylevsky =

Belarusian footballer

Personal information
- Full name: Artyom Vladimirovich Dylevsky
- Date of birth: 20 February 1997 (age 29)
- Place of birth: Kuntsevshchina, Minsk Raion, Minsk Oblast, Belarus
- Height: 1.85 m (6 ft 1 in)
- Position: Centre-back

Youth career
- 2013–2017: Minsk

Senior career*
| Years | Team | Apps | (Gls) |
| 2018 | Minsk | 6 | (0) |
| 2019–2021 | Belshina Bobruisk | 48 | (7) |
| 2020 | → Lida (loan) | 19 | (0) |
| 2022 | Kaisar | 7 | (1) |
| 2023 | Smorgon | 10 | (0) |
| 2023–2025 | Molodechno | 42 | (3) |
| 2025 | Ostrovets | 6 | (0) |

International career
| 2013 | Belarus U17 | 1 | (0) |
- * Club domestic league appearances and goals as of 8 April 2026

Artyom Vladimirovich Dylevsky (Belarusian: Арцём Уладзіміравіч Дылеўскі; Russian: Артём Владимирович Дылевский; born 20 February 1997) is a Belarusian footballer.
