= Georgi Bugulov =

Russian professional football player

Personal information
- Full name: Georgi Olegovich Bugulov
- Date of birth: 17 March 1993 (age 33)
- Place of birth: Vladikavkaz, Russia
- Height: 1.78 m (5 ft 10 in)
- Positions: Defender; midfielder

Team information
- Current team: Ulytau
- Number: 28

Senior career*
Years	Team	Apps	(Gls)
2010–2012	FAYUR Beslan	15	(0)
2012–2014	Alania-d Vladikavkaz	41	(1)
2014–2015	Alania Vladikavkaz	13	(0)
2015–2016	Druzhba Maykop	17	(0)
2017–2018	Speranța Nisporeni	29	(1)
2018–2019	Rustavi	27	(0)
2020–2021	KAMAZ Naberezhnye Chelny	14	(1)
2021–2022	Slavia Mozyr	41	(1)
2023	Caspiy	17	(1)
2024	Slavia Mozyr	15	(0)
2025–	Ulytau	49	(5)
- * Club domestic league appearances and goals as of 1 November 2026

Georgi Olegovich Bugulov (Russian: Георгий Олегович Бугулов; born 17 March 1993) is a Russian professional football player who plays for Ulytau.
