= Maksym Dehtyaryov =

Ukrainian footballer (born 1993)

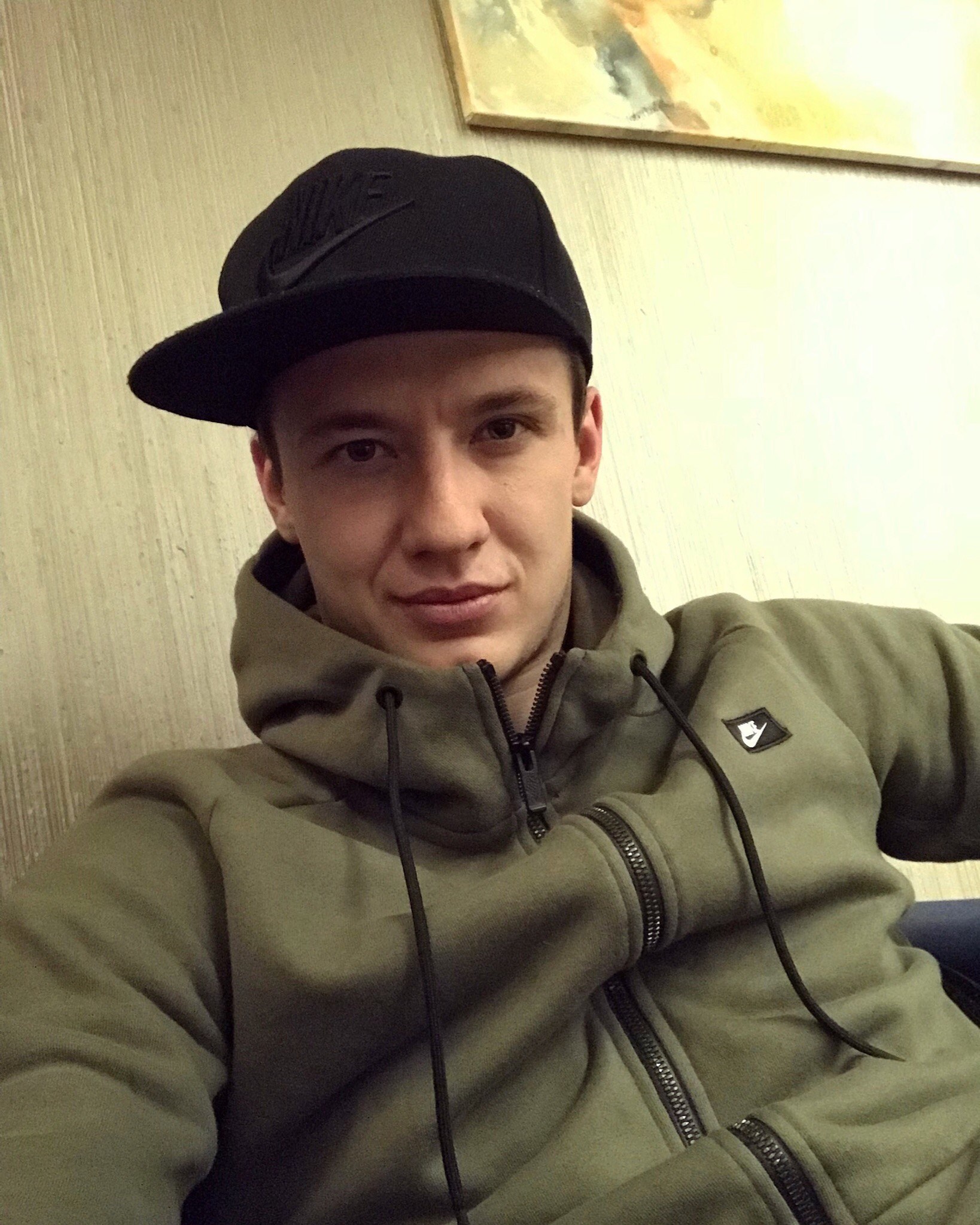
- In 2022

Personal information
- Full name: Maksym Serhiyovych Dehtyaryov
- Date of birth: 30 May 1993 (age 33)
- Place of birth: Kirovsk, Ukraine
- Height: 1.83 m (6 ft 0 in)
- Position: Striker

Youth career
- 2006–2011: Stal Alchevsk

Senior career*
Years	Team	Apps	(Gls)
2011	Stal Alchevsk	20	(3)
2012–2015	Metalurh Donetsk	7	(0)
2012	→ Stal Alchevsk (loan)	11	(1)
2014	→ Stal Alchevsk (loan)	6	(0)
2015–2016	Avanhard Kramatorsk	25	(3)
2016–2018	Poltava	56	(18)
2018–2020	Olimpik Donetsk	36	(8)
2019	→ Desna Chernihiv (loan)	15	(2)
2020–2022	Desna Chernihiv	30	(3)
2022–2023	Taraz	10	(2)
2023	Atyrau	4	(0)
2025	Sokol Kazan	12	(1)
2026	Shakhtyor Donetsk	12	(2)
- * Club domestic league appearances and goals as of 5 July 2026

Maksym Serhiyovych Dehtyaryov (Ukrainian: Максим Сергійович Дегтярьов; born 30 May 1993) is a Ukrainian professional footballer who plays as a striker. He also holds Russian citizenship as Maksim Sergeyevich Degtyaryov (Russian: Максим Сергеевич Дегтярёв).

== Club ==
=== Metalurh Donetsk ===
A product of the FC Stal Alchevsk youth sporting school in the Ukrainian First League, he moved to Metalurh Donetsk in 2013 and played one match in the 2013–14 UEFA Europa League against Kukësi at the Qemal Stafa Stadium in Tirana.

=== Olimpik Donetsk ===
In summer 2018 he moved from FC Poltava to Olimpik Donetsk. In the 2018–19 season he scored 8 goals.

=== Desna Chernihiv ===
In summer 2019 he moved on loan to newly-promoted Ukrainian Premier League club Desna Chernihiv. On 19 October 2021 he scored his first goal for the club against Zorya Luhansk.

=== Return to Olimpik Donetsk ===
In winter 2019–20 he returned to Olimpik Donetsk in the Ukrainian Premier League. On 4 March 2020 he scored against Desna Chernihiv at the Lobanovsky Dynamo Stadium. On 12 March 2020 he scored against Mariupol and on 16 March 2020 he scored against Lviv.

=== Return to Desna Chernihiv ===
On 12 August 2020 he signed a two-year contract with Desna and qualified for the Europa League third qualifying round. On 27 September he scored his first goal for Desna against Rukh Lviv, adding two more against the same opponent three days later in the Ukrainian Cup. On 10 December 2021 he scored against Inhulets Petrove.

=== Taraz ===
In summer 2022 he moved to Taraz in the Kazakhstan Premier League. On 22 July 2022 he made his debut for his new club against Aktobe in the Kazakhstan Cup, replacing Abilayhan Zhumabek in the 67th minute. On 31 August 2022 he helped Taraz qualify for the semifinal of the 2022 Kazakhstan Cup in a penalty shootout victory over Shakhter Karagandy.

=== Atyrau ===
In May 2023 he moved to Atyrau.

== Personal life ==
Dehtyaryov received the Russian citizenship.

== Career statistics ==
=== Club ===
As of match played 25 May 2026

Appearances and goals by club, season and competition
Club	Season	League			Cup		Europe		Other		Total	
Club	Season	Division	Apps	Goals	Apps	Goals	Apps	Goals	Apps	Goals	Apps	Goals
Stal Alchevsk	2011–12	Ukrainian First League	20	3	0	0	0	0	0	0	20	3
Metalurh Donetsk	2012–13	Ukrainian Premier League	0	0	0	0	0	0	0	0	0	0
Metalurh Donetsk	2013–14	Ukrainian Premier League	4	0	1	0	0	0	0	0	5	0
Metalurh Donetsk	2014–15	Ukrainian First League	3	0	0	0	0	0	0	0	3	0
Metalurh Donetsk	Total		7	0	1	0	0	0	0	0	8	0
Stal Alchevsk (loan)	2011–12	Ukrainian First League	11	1	0	0	0	0	0	0	11	1
Stal Alchevsk (loan)	2013–14	Ukrainian First League	6	0	0	0	1	0	0	0	7	0
Avanhard Kramatorsk	2015–16	Ukrainian First League	25	3	1	0	0	0	0	0	26	3
Poltava	2016–17	Ukrainian First League	26	3	1	0	0	0	0	0	27	3
Poltava	2017–18	Ukrainian First League	30	15	2	2	0	0	0	0	32	17
Poltava	Total		56	18	3	2	0	0	0	0	59	20
Olimpik Donetsk	2018–19	Ukrainian Premier League	29	8	1	0	0	0	0	0	30	8
Olimpik Donetsk	2019–20	Ukrainian Premier League	7	0	0	0	0	0	0	0	7	0
Olimpik Donetsk	Total		36	8	1	0	0	0	0	0	37	8
Desna Chernihiv (loan)	2019–20	Ukrainian Premier League	15	2	0	0	0	0	0	0	15	2
Desna Chernihiv	2020–21	Ukrainian Premier League	19	2	2	2	0	0	0	0	21	4
Desna Chernihiv	2021–22	Ukrainian Premier League	11	1	1	0	0	0	0	0	12	1
Desna Chernihiv	Total		30	3	3	2	0	0	0	0	33	5
Taraz	2022	Kazakhstan Premier League	10	2	5	0	0	0	0	0	15	2
Atyrau	2023	Kazakhstan Premier League	4	0	0	0	0	0	0	0	4	0
Sokol Kazan	2025	Russian Second League	12	1	0	0	0	0	0	0	12	1
Shakhtyor Donetsk	2026	Russian Second League	7	1	0	0	0	0	0	0	7	1
Career total			239	42	14	4	1	0	0	0	256	46

== Honours ==
FC Poltava

- Ukrainian First League: 2017–18

Metalurh Donetsk

- Ukrainian Cup: Runner-Up 2011–12
- Ukrainian Super Cup: Runner-Up 2012

Individual

- Top Scorer Ukrainian First League: Runner-up 2017–18 (15 goals)
- Best Player round 28 Ukrainian First League: 2017–18
