= Roman Stepanov (footballer) =

Belarusian footballer

Personal information
- Full name: Roman Yuryevich Stepanov
- Date of birth: 6 August 1991 (age 35)
- Place of birth: Smolevichi, Minsk Oblast, Belarusian SSR, Soviet Union
- Height: 1.85 m (6 ft 1 in)
- Position: Goalkeeper

Team information
- Current team: Gagra
- Number: 1

Youth career
- 2008–2009: BATE Borisov

Senior career*
Years	Team	Apps	(Gls)
2008–2009	BATE Borisov	0	(0)
2010–2011	Rudensk	34	(0)
2012–2015	Torpedo-BelAZ Zhodino	8	(0)
2016	Naftan Novopolotsk	2	(0)
2017	Smolevichi-STI	18	(0)
2018–2019	Torpedo Minsk	20	(0)
2019–2020	Rukh Brest	26	(0)
2021	Dinamo Brest	29	(0)
2022	Shakhtyor Soligorsk	1	(0)
2023	Kyzylzhar	17	(0)
2024	Molodechno	33	(0)
2025–	Gagra	19	(0)
- * Club domestic league appearances and goals as of 10 December 2025

Roman Yuryevich Stepanov (Belarusian: Раман Юр'евіч Сцяпанаў; Russian: Роман Юрьевич Степанов; born 6 August 1991) is a Belarusian professional footballer who plays as a goalkeeper for Erovnuli Liga club Gagra.

Stepanov joined Gagra in February 2025.

== Honours ==
Torpedo-BelAZ Zhodino

- Belarusian Cup winner: 2015–16
