= Ben Aziz Zagré =

Burkinabé footballer (1998–2026)

Personal information
- Date of birth: 31 December 1998
- Place of birth: Bobo-Dioulasso, Burkina Faso
- Date of death: 7 June 2026 (aged 27)
- Place of death: Burkina Faso
- Height: 1.90 m (6 ft 3 in)
- Position: Centre-back

Senior career*
| Years | Team | Apps | (Gls) |
| 2015–2018 | AJEB | | |
| 2018 | → Esbjerg (loan) | 5 | (0) |
| 2018–2019 | KOZAF | | |
| 2019–2021 | Vitória Guimarães B | 33 | (2) |
| 2021–2022 | AD Fafe | 11 | (0) |
| 2023–2024 | Kaisar | 23 | (3) |
| 2024–2025 | Shinnik Yaroslavl | 40 | (4) |

International career
| 2016 | Burkina Faso | 1 | (0) |
- * Club domestic league appearances and goals

Ben Aziz Zagré (31 December 1998 – 7 June 2026) was a Burkinabé professional footballer who played as a centre-back.

== Club career ==
Playing for AJEB in Burkina Faso, Zagré was brought to Europe in January 2018, on a loan deal with Danish 1st Division club Esbjerg fB. He was described as a developing player. He played five games as the club won promotion from the 2017–18 Danish 1st Division. His loan deal was not renewed.

In early 2023, Zagré transferred to the Kazakhstan Premier League club Kaysar, where he immediately broke into the team's starting eleven and remained there for the entire season, missing only three games due to suspensions. On 16 February 2024, Shinnik Yaroslavl announced the signing of Zagré on a contract until the end of the 2023–24 season.

Zagré left Shinnik on 3 June 2025. Later that month, he was diagnosed with a malignant bone tumor following a surgery on his leg, which was amputated in 2026 as his condition had become life-threatening.

== International career ==
Zagré made his debut with the Burkina Faso national team in a 2–0 friendly loss to Egypt on 27 February 2016.

== Death ==
Zagré died from bone cancer in Burkina Faso on 7 June 2026, at the age of 27; he had previously had his legs amputated due to the disease. His agent, Dimitry Seluk, blamed his death on healthcare providers in Yaroslavl, accusing them of negligence while analyzing his biopsy results, which delayed the correct diagnosis and treatment.
