= Vyacheslav Grab =

Russian footballer

Personal information
- Full name: Vyacheslav Aleksandrovich Grab
- Date of birth: 21 September 1993 (age 33)
- Place of birth: Tobolsk, Russia
- Height: 1.88 m (6 ft 2 in)
- Position: Goalkeeper

Youth career
- FC Akademiya Primorskiy

Senior career*
Years	Team	Apps	(Gls)
2011–2012	Akademiya Tolyatti	7	(0)
2013–2018	Tyumen	3	(0)
2016–2017	→ Torpedo Vladimir (loan)	24	(0)
2018–2019	Chayka Peschanokopskoye	6	(0)
2019–2021	Tyumen	16	(0)
2021	Veles Moscow	4	(0)
2022–2023	Okzhetpes	14	(0)
- * Club domestic league appearances and goals

Vyacheslav Aleksandrovich Grab (Russian: Вячеслав Александрович Граб; born 21 September 1993) is a Russian former footballer, who played as a goalkeeper.

== Club career ==
He made his debut in the Russian Second Division for FC Akademiya Tolyatti on 30 June 2011 in a game against FC Nosta Novotroitsk.

He made his Russian Football National League debut for FC Tyumen on 2 September 2017 in a game against FC Khimki.
