= Jovan Stojanović =

Serbian footballer

Personal information
- Date of birth: 21 April 1992 (age 34)
- Place of birth: Stubline, SFR Yugoslavia
- Height: 1.88 m (6 ft 2 in)
- Positions: Attacking midfielder; forward

Youth career
- Cercle Brugge

Senior career*
Years	Team	Apps	(Gls)
2011	Cercle Brugge	0	(0)
2011	→ Roeselare (loan)	11	(1)
2012	OFK Beograd	0	(0)
2012–2014	Radnički Obrenovac	31	(18)
2014–2015	Vojvodina	36	(5)
2015–2016	Voždovac	42	(12)
2017–2021	Kortrijk	100	(19)
2022	Metalac Gornji Milanovac	15	(3)
2023	Zhetysu	9	(3)
2024	Jedinstvo Ub	8	(0)
- * Club domestic league appearances and goals as of 11 December 2024

Jovan Stojanović (Serbian Cyrillic: Јован Стојановић; born 21 April 1992) is a Serbian footballer who most recently played as an attacking midfielder for Jedinstvo Ub.

== Club career ==
In February 2017, he joined Belgian club Kortrijk.

== Honours ==
Vojvodina

- Serbian Cup: 2013–14
