= Ruslan Teverov =

Belarusian footballer

Personal information
- Date of birth: 1 May 1994 (age 32)
- Place of birth: Vitebsk, Belarus
- Positions: Attacking midfielder; forward

Team information
- Current team: Vitebsk
- Number: 9

Youth career
- 2008–2012: Vitebsk
- 2013–2014: Naftan Novopolotsk

Senior career*
Years	Team	Apps	(Gls)
2011–2012	Vitebsk	0	(0)
2012	→ Vitebsk-2	26	(5)
2013–2016	Naftan Novopolotsk	28	(3)
2014	→ Gorodeya (loan)	29	(4)
2016–2018	Shakhtyor Soligorsk	16	(1)
2017	→ Naftan Novopolotsk (loan)	14	(0)
2018	→ Vitebsk (loan)	21	(3)
2019–2022	Vitebsk	88	(17)
2023	Zhetysu	14	(2)
2023–	Vitebsk	80	(20)

International career
2014–2016	Belarus U21	12	(3)
- * Club domestic league appearances and goals as of 3 July 2026

Ruslan Teverov (Belarusian: Руслан Цевераў; Russian: Руслан Теверов; born 1 May 1994) is a Belarusian footballer playing currently for Vitebsk.
