= Bryan Van Den Bogaert =

Belgian footballer

Personal information
- Date of birth: 14 December 1991 (age 34)
- Place of birth: Deurne, Belgium
- Height: 1.86 m (6 ft 1 in)
- Position: Left back

Team information
- Current team: Royal Knokke
- Number: 28

Senior career*
Years	Team	Apps	(Gls)
2009–2013	Cappellen	74	(0)
2013–2014	Heist	24	(0)
2014–2015	Antwerp	12	(0)
2015	Crawley Town	1	(0)
2015–2016	Whitehawk	6	(0)
2016	Ebbsfleet United	16	(0)
2017–2020	Westerlo	78	(0)
2020–2022	RWDM	21	(0)
2022	KA	22	(1)
2023–2024	Kyzylzhar	19	(0)
2024–	Royal Knokke	44	(1)
- * Club domestic league appearances and goals as of 3 May 2026

Bryan Van Den Bogaert (born 14 December 1991) is a Belgian professional footballer who plays as a left back for Royal Knokke.

== Career ==
Van Den Bogaert spent his early career in Belgium with Cappellen, Heist and Antwerp. Before signing for Heist in September 2013 he had spent two weeks training in Russia. He moved from Heist to Antwerp in September 2014.

After being released by Antwerp in April 2015, he trialled with English club Bolton Wanderers. In August 2015 he trialled with another English club, Crawley Town, after a five-hour drive from his home in Belgium. He signed a short-term contract with the club later that month. After making 2 appearances for the club, he signed for non-league club Whitehawk later that month. He made his debut for Whitehawk in a 2–2 draw at Ebbsfleet United on 29 August. Although naturally a left-back, Van den Bogaert has played for Whitehawk as a centre-back. He moved to Ebbsfleet United in January 2016. He was confirmed as having left Ebbsfleet United in June 2016.

In October 2020, Van Den Bogaert signed a one-year contract with RWDM in the Belgian First Division B, after having playing for Westerlo for three seasons.

On 28 January 2022, Van Den Bogaert signed with KA in Iceland. He then signed for Kazakh club Kyzylzhar.

== Personal life ==
In September 2013 he was living with his parents in Kalmthout.
