= Prosper Mendy =

Bissau-Guinean footballer (born 1996)

Personal information
- Date of birth: 7 June 1996 (age 30)
- Place of birth: Paris, France
- Height: 1.86 m (6 ft 1 in)
- Position: Left back

Team information
- Current team: Enosis Neon Paralimni
- Number: 21

Youth career
- UF Clichy-sous-Bois
- 2010–2015: FC Montfermeil
- 2015–2018: Francs Borains
- 2018–2019: Badajoz

Senior career*
Years	Team	Apps	(Gls)
2019	Badajoz	1	(0)
2019–2021	Strømsgodset	23	(1)
2022	Virton	2	(0)
2022–2023	Spartak Varna	12	(0)
2023	Kaisar	11	(0)
2023–2024	Olympic Charleroi	29	(0)
2024–	Enosis Neon Paralimni	8	(0)

International career^{‡}
2022–	Guinea-Bissau	1	(0)
- * Club domestic league appearances and goals as of 30 January 2025 ‡ National team caps and goals as of 09:01, 1 October 2022 (UTC)

Prosper Mendy (born 7 June 1996) is a footballer who plays as a left back for Cypriot club Enosis Neon Paralimni. Born in France, he plays for the Guinea-Bissau national team.

== Career ==
Mendy is a youth product of UF Clichy-sous-Bois, FC Montfermeil, and Francs Borains. Mendy started his professional career with CD Badajoz in Spain. In 2019, he signed for Strømsgodset Toppfotball in the Norwegian Eliteserien, where he has made fourteen appearances and scored one goal.

On 25 December 2021, Mendy agreed to join Virton in Belgium.

On 12 June 2022 he signed a contract with the Bulgarian First League team Spartak Varna for 3 years.

== International career ==
On 14 September 2022, Mendy received his first call-up for Guinea-Bissau.

== Personal life ==
Born in France, Mendy is of Senegalese and Bissau-Guinean descent.
