= Fadi Zidan =

Palestinian footballer

Personal information
- Full name: Fadi Zidan
- Date of birth: 2 June 1993 (age 33)
- Place of birth: Haifa, Israel
- Position: Forward

Team information
- Current team: F.C. Kababir
- Number: 10

Senior career*
Years	Team	Apps	(Gls)
2012–2014	Ironi Ramat HaSharon	18	(1)
2014	Shabab Al-Dhahiriya		(4)
2014–2015	Taraji Wadi Al-Nes		(5)
2015–2016	Ahli Al-Khaleel		(1)
2016–2018	Ironi Ramat HaSharon	46	(15)
2018–2019	Maccabi Petah Tikva	2	(0)
2019	Hapoel Kfar Saba	14	(1)
2019–2020	Hapoel Ramat Gan	47	(11)
2020–2021	Hapoel Umm al-Fahm	4	(0)
2021	Torpedo Kutaisi	32	(8)
2022	Hapoel Rishon LeZion	15	(4)
2022–2023	Al-Hidd	?	(?)
2023	Zhetysu	6	(0)
2023–2026	F.C. Kafr Qasim	40	(10)
2026	Hapoel Tirat HaCarmel	2	(1)
2026–	Kababir	4	(1)

International career
2014–2016	Palestine U23	4	(2)
2021–	Palestine	2	(0)
- * Club domestic league appearances and goals as of 1 June 2026

Fadi Zidan (Arabic: فادي زيدان, Hebrew: פאדי זידאן; born 2 June 1993) is a footballer who plays for F.C. Kafr Qasim. Born in Israel, he represents the Palestine national team.

== Career ==
In March 2015, he became the first Palestinian player to score twice in the AFC Cup when he scored twice in Taraji Wadi Al-Nes's 6–2 loss to Al-Shorta of Iraq.

In February 2021, Zidan signed with Torpedo Kutaisi and was presented as a new player of the club.

== Honours ==
Taraji Wadi Al-Nes

- West Bank Premier League runner-up: 2013–14

Ahli Al-Khaleel

- Palestine Cup: 2015
