= Ivan Brikner =

Ukrainian footballer

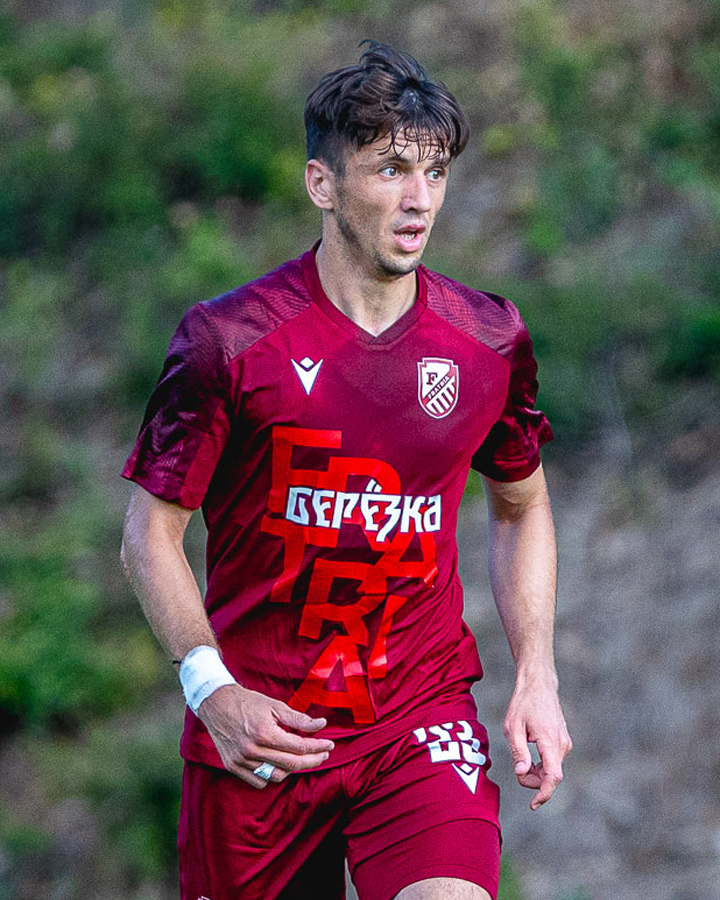
- Brikner playing for Fratria in 2025.

Personal information
- Full name: Ivan Ihorovych Brikner
- Date of birth: 30 June 1993 (age 33)
- Place of birth: Lysiatychi, Ukraine
- Height: 1.82 m (6 ft 0 in)
- Position: Midfielder

Team information
- Current team: Chernomorets Burgas
- Number: 23

Youth career
- 2006–2008: Skala Morshyn
- 2010: Pokrova Lviv

Senior career*
Years	Team	Apps	(Gls)
2012	Avanhard Zhydachiv	20	(5)
2013	Teplovyk Ivano-Frankivsk	11	(7)
2013–2016	Sumy	75	(6)
2017–2018	Olimpik Donetsk	24	(2)
2018–2020	Rukh Lviv	54	(6)
2021–2022	Lviv	27	(1)
2022	Alians Lypova Dolyna	0	(0)
2022–2023	Zhetysu	23	(5)
2023	Okzhetpes	10	(2)
2023–2024	Zhetysu	8	(1)
2024	Stomil Olsztyn	8	(0)
2024–2025	Sokół Kleczew	24	(1)
2025–2026	Fratria	29	(5)
2026–	Chernomorets Burgas	0	(0)
- * Club domestic league appearances and goals as of 07:10, 26 May 2026 (UTC)

Ivan Ihorovych Brikner (Ukrainian: Іван Ігорович Брікнер; born 30 June 1993) is a Ukrainian professional footballer who plays as a midfielder for Bulgarian Second League club Chernomorets Burgas.

== Career ==
Brikner is a product of Skala Morshyn and Pokrova Lviv youth sportive school systems.

He played in the teams of a regional level, but in July 2013 signed his contract with the professional Sumy in the Ukrainian First League.

On 19 January 2024, he joined Polish club Stomil Olsztyn on a deal until the end of the season, with a one-year extension option. He left the club at the end of June 2024.

On 30 July 2024, Brikner moved to III liga club Sokół Kleczew.

On 14 July 2025, he moved to Bulgaria to join Second League team Fratria.

== Honours ==
Sokół Kleczew

- III liga, group II: 2024–25
