= 2025 Kazakhstan Premier League =

Kazakhstan Premier League
- Season: 2025
- Dates: 1 March 2025 - 26 October 2025
- Champions: Kairat Almaty (5th title)
- Relegated: Turan
- Champions League: Kairat Almaty
- Conference League: Astana; Tobol; Yelimay
- Matches: 182
- Goals: 496 (2.73 per match)
- Top goalscorer: Nazmi Gripshi (16)
- Biggest home win: Astana 7–0 Turan (18 July 2025)
- Biggest away win: Atyrau 0–4 Aktobe (30 March 2025); Turan 0–4 Ordabasy (27 July 2025); Ulytau 1–5 Atyrau (27 September 2025)
- Highest scoring: Jenis 6–3 Turan (27 September 2025); Turan 3–6 Yelimay (18 October 2025)
- Longest winning run: 5 matches Aktobe; Astana; Kairat Almaty
- Longest unbeaten run: 11 matches Jenis
- Longest winless run: 16 matches Atyrau
- Longest losing run: 11 matches Turan
- Highest attendance: 28,211; Astana vs Aktobe (19 October 2025)
- Lowest attendance: 100; Kyzylzhar vs Kaisar (27 April 2025)
- Total attendance: 911,968
- Average attendance: 5,011

The 2025 Kazakhstan Premier League was the 34th season of the Kazakhstan Premier League, the highest football league competition in Kazakhstan.

== Overview ==
Kazakhstan Premier League will expand to 16 teams from 2026 season, one team relegated to First Division. While, three teams from First Division promoted to Premier League.

== Teams ==
Shakhter Karagandy (relegated the first time in their history) were relegated at the end of the 2024 season. They were replaced by Okzhetpes (promoted after a single season absence) and Ulytau (promoted after a 27-season absence) from the Kazakhstan First League. FC Kairat entered the season as defending champions after winning their fourth title the previous season.

=== Team overview ===
Locations of teams in the 2025 Kazakhstan Premier League

Team	Location	Venue	Capacity
Aktobe	Aktobe	Central Stadium	12,729
Astana	Astana	Astana Arena	30,200
Atyrau	Atyrau	Munaishy Stadium	8,900
Elimai	Semey	Spartak Stadium	8,000
Jenis	Astana	Astana Arena	30,200
Kairat	Almaty	Central Stadium	23,804
Kaisar	Kyzylorda	Gany Muratbayev Stadium	7,500
Kyzylzhar	Petropavl	Karasai Stadium	11,000
Okzhetpes	Kokshetau	Torpedo Stadium	4,100
Ordabasy	Shymkent	Kazhymukan Munaitpasov Stadium	20,000
Tobol	Kostanay	Central Stadium	9,500
Turan	Turkistan	Turkistan Arena	7,000
Ulytau	Jezkazgan	Metallurg Stadium	2,500
Zhetysu	Taldykorgan	Samat Suyumbayev Stadium	4,000

=== Personnel and kits ===
Note: Flags indicate national team as has been defined under FIFA eligibility rules. Players and Managers may hold more than one non-FIFA nationality.

Team	Manager	Captain	Kit manufacturer	Shirt sponsor
Aktobe	(Bulgaria) Nikolay Kostov	(Kazakhstan) Alibek Kasym	Adidas	Olimpbet, Kazchrome, A'su
Astana	(Kazakhstan) Grigori Babayan	(Kazakhstan) Abzal Beisebekov	Adidas	Samruk Kazyna, Olimpbet, Okadzaki, Miglior, SportQory
Atyrau	(Belarus) Vitaly Zhukovsky	(Belarus) Igor Stasevich	Macron	Olimpbet, A'su, Dodo Pizza
Elimai	(Kazakhstan) Andrey Karpovich	(Ukraine) Maksym Koval	Puma	
Jenis	(Ukraine) Andriy Demchenko	(Kazakhstan) Islambek Kuat	Joma	Freedom Bank
Kairat	(Kazakhstan) Rafael Urazbakhtin	(Belarus) Alyaksandr Martynovich	Joma	1XBET, KNK Kemikal, EcoAlmaty, Alex Saryagash
Kaisar	(Russia) Viktor Kumykov	(Kazakhstan) Duman Narzildayev	Adidas	Biali, Olimpbet, A'su
Kyzylzhar	(Serbia) Milić Ćurčić	(Ukraine) Oleksandr Noyok	Kelme	None
Okzhetpes	(Kazakhstan) Kayrat Nurdauletov	(Kazakhstan) Niyaz Idrisov	Jako	None
Ordabasy	(Moldova) Andrei Martin	(Kazakhstan) Sultanbek Astanov	Puma	Olimpbet
Tobol	(Kazakhstan) Nurbol Zhumaskaliyev	(Kazakhstan) Roman Asrankulov	Macron	Solidcore Resources, Olimpbet
Turan	(Ukraine) Oleksandr Poklonskyi	(Kazakhstan) Aslan Darabayev	Adidas	None
Ulytau	(Kazakhstan) Nurken Mazbayev	(Kazakhstan) Demiyat Slambekov	Cikers	Kazakhmys
Zhetysu	(Kazakhstan) Samat Smakov	(Kazakhstan) Berik Shaykhov	Adidas	None

=== Foreign players ===
The number of foreign players is restricted to thirteen per KPL team squad of 25 players.

Foreign players in the KPL as of 28 June 2025.

For transfers during the season, see Winter 2024–25 transfers and Summer 2025 transfers.

Club	Player 1	Player 2	Player 3	Player 4	Player 5	Player 6	Player 7	Player 8	Player 9	Player 10	Player 11	Player 12	Player 13	Former players
Aktobe	(Belarus) **Nikita Korzun**	(Guinea) Amadou Doumbouya	(Haiti) **Jayro Jean**	(Niger) **Daniel Sosah**	(Nigeria) **Uche Agbo**	(Nigeria) Mario Rabiu	(Panama) **Freddy Góndola**	(Romania) **Bogdan Vătăjelu**	(Romania) **Andrei Vlad**	(Russia) Idris Umayev	(Serbia) Nemanja Anđelković			(Cameroon) Gaby Kiki (Serbia) Djordje Ivkovic
Astana	(Albania) **Nazmi Gripshi**	(Belarus) **Max Ebong**	(Bosnia and Herzegovina) **Ivan Bašić**	(Croatia) **Karlo Bartolec**	(Croatia) Josip Čondrić	(Croatia) Branimir Kalaica	(Croatia) **Marin Tomasov**	(Guinea) **Ousmane Camara**	(Lithuania) **Kipras Kažukolovas**	(North Macedonia) Aleksa Amanović	(Montenegro) **Driton Camaj**	(Nigeria) Geoffrey Chinedu		(Nigeria national football team) Nnamdi Ahanonu
Atyrau	(Belarus) **Ruslan Khadarkevich**	(Belarus) **Yegor Khatkevich**	(Belarus) Vasily Sovpel	(Belarus) **Igor Stasevich**	(Belarus) **Ruslan Yudenkov**	(Bulgaria) **Tsvetelin Chunchukov**	(Democratic Republic of the Congo) **Joel Kayamba**	(Ghana) Rashid Abubakar	(Montenegro) Goran Milojko	(Russia) Konstantin Dorofeyev	(Russia) Luka Zgurski	(Ukraine) Dmytro Ryzhuk		(Brazil national football team) Mateus Barbosa (Belarus national football team) Nikita Kaplenko (Georgia national football team) Gia Chaduneli (Georgia (country)) Giorgi Gadrani (Georgia (country)) Giorgi Nikabadze (Georgia (country)) Zaza Tsitskishvili (Portugal national football team) Guilherme Morais (Russia) Yevgeni Kozlov (Russia) Arsen Siukayev
Elimai	(Belarus) **Yevgeny Beryozkin**	(Brazil) Maicom David	(Croatia) Marin Belančić	(Nigeria) Samuel Odeyobo	(Serbia) **Nemanja Ćalasan**	(Togo) **Euloge Placca Fessou**	(Ukraine) **Maksym Koval**	(Uruguay) Kevin Rolón						(Belarus national football team) **Nikita Korzun** (Romania national football team) Eduard Florescu (Russia) Roman Tugarev (Serbia) Fejsal Mulić
Jenis	(Belarus) **Sergey Ignatovich**	(Belarus) Vsevolod Sadovsky	(Bosnia and Herzegovina) Ivan Šaravanja	(Brazil) Adílio	(Brazil) Gian Martins	(Georgia (country)) Elguja Lobjanidze	(Georgia (country)) Zurab Tevzadze	(Ghana) Razak Abalora	(Portugal) Rui Batalha	(Slovenia) Matija Rom				(Cyprus national football team) Konstantinos Venizelou (North Macedonia national football team) **Erdon Daci** (Poland) Krystian Nowak (Portugal) Gonçalo Teixeira (Slovenia) Jakub Novak (Spain) Mika
Kairat	(Belarus) **Valery Gromyko**	(Belarus) **Alyaksandr Martynovich**	(Brazil) João Paulo	(Brazil) Élder Santana	(Brazil) Edmilson	(Brazil) Ricardinho	(Georgia (country)) **Giorgi Zaria**	(Israel) **Ofri Arad**	(Israel) **Dan Glazer**	(Portugal) Jorginho	(Portugal) Luís Mata	(Russia) **Yegor Sorokin**	(Serbia) Jug Stanojev	(Georgia (country)) Luka Gadrani
Kaisar														
Kyzylzhar	(Brazil) Rafael Sabino	(Ivory Coast) Michael Kaho	(Ivory Coast) Abdoul Aziz Toure	(Ivory Coast) Néné Gbamblé	(Ivory Coast) Senin Sebai	(Nigeria) Nnamdi Ahanonu	(Russia) Miroslav Lobantsev	(Russia) Andrei Vasilyev	(Ukraine) Anatoliy Kozlenko	(Ukraine) Oleksandr Noyok				(Montenegro national football team) **Ilija Martinović** (Montenegro) **Darko Zorić**
Okzhetpes	(Brazil) Enzo	(Serbia) Nikola Cuckić	(Serbia) Strahinja Jovanović											(Croatia national football team) Franjo Prce (Ukraine) Oleksiy Shevchenko
Ordabasy	(Brazil) Alan Dias	(Brazil) Everton Moraes	(Cape Verde national football team) João Paulino	(Croatia) Dario Čanađija	(Georgia (country)) Luka Imnadze	(Moldova) **Dumitru Celeadnic**	(Moldova) **Victor Mudrac**	(Romania) Mihai Căpățînă	(Serbia) Nikola Antić	(Ukraine) Vladyslav Naumets	(Ukraine) Yuriy Vakulko			(Ghana) Rashid Abubakar (Ivory Coast) Sherif Jimoh (Nigeria) Kayode Saliman
Tobol	(Belarus) Yegor Khvalko	(Belarus) **Nikolay Signevich**	(Brazil) Victor Braga	(Brazil) Henrique Devens	(France) Pape-Alioune Ndiaye	(Georgia (country)) Tsotne Mosiashvili	(Morocco) **Ahmed El Messaoudi**	(Montenegro) Nemanja Cavnić'	(Montenegro) **Marko Vukčević**	(Nigeria) Ededem Essien	(Russia) Ivan Miladinović	(Uzbekistan) Shokhboz Umarov		(Bulgaria) **Radoslav Tsonev** (Togo) **David Henen**
Turan	(Moldova) Danila Ignatov	(Moldova) Nicolai Solodovnicov	(Russia) Yevgeny Goshev	(Serbia) Luka Čermelj	(Serbia) Veljko Trifunović									(Belarus) **Yegor Khatkevich** (Belarus) Vasily Sovpel (Belarus) **Igor Stasevich** (Belarus) **Ruslan Yudenkov** (Montenegro) Goran Milojko (Montenegro) Jovan Pajović (Russia) Konstantin Dorofeyev (Russia) Luka Zgurski (Uzbekistan) Odil Abdumazhidov (Uzbekistan) Bekhruzbek Askarov (Uzbekistan) Khurshidbek Mukhtorov (Uzbekistan) Shokhboz Umarov
Ulytau	(Georgia (country)) Piruz Marakvelidze	(Japan) Kotaro Kishi	(Montenegro) Jovan Pajović	(Russia) Georgi Bugulov	(Spain) José Carrillo	(Ukraine) Yaroslav Terekhov	(Ukraine) Beka Vachiberadze	(Ukraine) Dmytro Yusov						(Moldova) **Vadim Paireli** (Moldova) Nicolai Solodovnicov
Zhetysu	(Belarus) Maksim Kovel	(Germany) Meik Karwot	(Nigeria) Raphael Success	(Russia) Alan Chochiyev	(Russia) Denis Kavlinov	(Russia) Soslan Takulov	(Russia) Maksim Zhitnev	(Sierra Leone) **Mohamed Buya Turay**	(Sierra Leone) **Saidu Fofanah**					(Russia national football team) Ruslan Bolov

In bold: Players that have been capped for their national team. In Italic: Players that joined in mid-season

=== Managerial changes ===
Team	Outgoing manager	Manner of departure	Date of vacancy	Position in table	Incoming manager	Date of appointment
Zhetysu	(Kazakhstan) Kayrat Nurdauletov			Pre-Season	(Kazakhstan) Samat Smakov	19 December 2024
Atyrau	(Belarus) Vitaly Zhukovsky		28 November 2024	Pre-Season	(Kazakhstan) Konstantin Gorovenko	10 January 2025
Turan	(Kazakhstan) Rinat Alyuetov	End of contract	10 December 2024	Pre-Season	(Belarus) Vitaly Zhukovsky	24 January 2025
Ordabasy	(Kyrgyzstan) Kirill Keker	End of contract	20 December 2024	Pre-Season	(Moldova) Andrei Martin	22 December 2024
Kyzylzhar	(Kazakhstan) Ali Aliyev	End of contract	5 January 2025	Pre-Season	(Belarus) Aleksandr Brazevich	6 January 2025
Kyzylzhar	(Belarus) Aleksandr Brazevich	Sacked	9 April 2025	8th	(Serbia) Milić Ćurčić	12 April 2025
Atyrau	(Kazakhstan) Konstantin Gorovenko	Sacked	21 April 2025	13th	(Kazakhstan) Kuanysh Kabdulov	22 April 2025
Aktobe	(Ukraine) Ihor Leonov	Resigned	21 April 2025	4th	(Belarus) Vyacheslav Levchuk	21 April 2025 (Caretaker); 14 May 2025 (Permanent)
Aktobe	(Belarus) Vyacheslav Levchuk	Sacked	10 August 2025	4th		

== Regular season ==
=== League table ===
Pos	Team	Pld	W	D	L	GF	GA	GD	Pts	Qualification or relegation
1	Kairat (C)	26	18	5	3	53	19	+34	59	Qualification for the Champions League first qualifying round
2	Astana	26	17	6	3	66	30	+36	57	Qualification for the Conference League first qualifying round
3	Tobol	26	16	6	4	45	25	+20	54	Qualification for the Conference League second qualifying round (Note: Since the winners of the 2025 Kazakhstan Cup, Tobol, finished in the top three of the Premier League, the remaining Conference League first qualifying round spot was passed to the fourth-placed team.)
4	Elimai	26	14	6	6	47	31	+16	48	Qualification for the Conference League first qualifying round
5	Aktobe	26	13	4	9	39	29	+10	43	
6	Jenis	26	8	12	6	37	30	+7	36	
7	Ordabasy	26	9	8	9	37	28	+9	35	
8	Okzhetpes	26	10	5	11	37	43	−6	35	
9	Kyzylzhar	26	6	9	11	25	32	−7	27	
10	Ulytau	26	5	8	13	20	41	−21	23	
11	Kaisar	26	3	13	10	24	42	−18	22	
12	Zhetysu	26	4	9	13	19	43	−24	21	
13	Atyrau	26	4	7	15	22	45	−23	19	
14	Turan (R)	26	4	4	18	25	58	−33	16	Relegation to Kazakhstan First Division

Source: UEFA, Soccerway
Rules for classification: 1) Points; 2) Goal difference; 3) Matches won; 4) Goals scored; 5) Away goals scored; 6) Head-to-head points; 7) Head-to-head matches won; 8) Head-to-head goal difference; 9) Head-to-head goals scored; 10) Head-to-head away goals scored; 11) Draw.
(C) Champions; (R) Relegated

=== Results ===
==== Results table ====
Home \ Away	KRT	AST	TOB	ELI	AKT	JEN	ORD	OKZ	KYZ	ULT	KSR	ZTS	ATY	TUR
Kairat		1–1	2–1	2–3	1–0	3–1	4–0	1–2	1–0	1–0	1–1	5–0	4–0	4–0
Astana	1–1		1–3	3–3	5–3	4–2	2–1	5–2	3–3	4–0	5–1	3–0	2–1	7–0
Tobol	1–3	2–3		1–1	2–0	2–2	1–0	2–1	2–1	2–0	1–0	2–1	5–0	2–0
Elimai	1–0	0–2	2–3		2–1	1–2	2–1	0–2	2–0	3–0	2–0	3–0	3–2	2–1
Aktobe	1–2	0–1	0–0	1–0		0–2	2–2	2–1	1–0	1–0	4–1	3–2	2–0	2–1
Jenis	1–2	3–2	0–0	0–1	0–1		2–2	0–0	0–0	2–0	2–2	3–1	2–0	6–3
Ordabasy	0–1	1–0	2–3	1–1	0–0	2–1		7–1	0–0	0–1	5–0	1–0	2–2	1–0
Okzhetpes	0–1	1–2	0–1	1–1	1–3	1–1	0–1		3–2	1–0	4–2	3–0 (Note: Originally 1-2, but later was awarded 3-0 due to an inegible player)	2–1	4–3
Kyzylzhar	0–1	0–2	0–2	1–1	1–1	1–1	0–0	3–1		2–1	2–1	1–1	0–1	2–3
Ulytau	1–4	0–2	2–2	1–1	2–1	1–1	2–1	0–1	1–1		1–1	1–2	1–5	2–1
Kaisar	0–0	1–1	1–1	1–2	1–2	0–0	1–1	2–2	1–0	1–1		2–2	0–0	1–0
Zhetysu	2–2	0–2	1–2	0–3	2–1	0–0	1–0	1–3	0–1	0–0	1–1		0–0	1–0
Atyrau	1–4	0–2	1–0	2–1	0–4	1–1	1–2	0–0	1–2	0–1	1–2	1–1		1–1
Turan	1–2	1–1	1–2	3–6	0–3	0–2	0–4	2–0	1–2	1–1	1–0	0–0	1–0	

Source: Soccerway
Legend: Blue = home team win; Yellow = draw; Red = away team win.

==== Results by match played ====
Team ╲ Round	1	2	3	4	5	6	7	8	9	10	11	12	13	14	15	16	17	18	19	20	21	22	23	24	25	26
Aktobe	D	W	W	W	L	W	W	W	W	L	L	D	L	W	W	W	D	L	L	L	W	W	L	W	L	D
Astana	D	W	W	W	D	W	D	L	W	W	W	W	W	D	W	L	W	W	W	W	W	L	D	W	W	D
Atyrau	W	L	L	L	L	L	L	L	D	L	L	L	L	D	L	L	W	L	D	D	D	D	W	W	D	L
Elimai	L	W	D	W	W	W	L	L	W	D	L	D	W	W	L	D	L	W	D	W	W	W	D	W	W	W
Jenis	D	D	D	D	L	D	L	L	D	L	D	W	W	D	W	W	W	D	W	L	D	W	L	W	D	D
Kairat	D	W	W	W	D	W	W	W	L	L	W	D	W	W	W	W	D	W	W	W	L	W	W	W	W	D
Kaisar	D	L	D	L	D	L	D	L	W	W	D	D	D	L	L	L	D	W	L	D	L	D	D	L	D	D
Kyzylzhar	D	L	D	L	W	W	L	W	D	D	L	D	L	D	D	W	L	L	L	D	D	L	W	L	L	W
Okzhetpes	L	W	D	L	W	D	W	W	L	W	W	L	W	D	W	L	W	D	D	L	L	L	L	L	L	W
Ordabasy	D	L	D	L	W	W	W	W	L	L	D	D	L	L	D	W	L	W	D	D	L	L	W	L	W	D
Tobol	W	D	D	W	W	L	W	W	W	W	W	D	W	D	W	W	D	L	W	L	W	W	L	W	W	D
Turan	W	L	L	W	D	L	D	W	L	L	L	L	L	L	L	L	L	L	L	D	W	L	D	L	L	L
Ulytau	L	D	D	L	L	L	L	L	L	W	W	W	D	L	L	D	L	W	L	D	L	W	D	L	D	D
Zhetysu	D	D	L	D	L	L	D	L	D	W	D	D	L	W	L	L	W	L	W	W	D	L	D	L	L	L

W = Win; D = Draw; L = Loss; P = Postponed

==== Positions by round ====
To preserve chronological evolvements, any postponed matches are not included to the round at which they were originally scheduled, but added to the full round they were played immediately afterwards. For example, if a match is scheduled for round 17, but then played between rounds 8 and 9, it will be added to the standings for round 8.

Team ╲ Round	1	2	3	4	5	6	7	8	9	10	11	12	13	14	15	16	17	18	19	20	21	22	23	24	25	26
Kairat	4	1	1	1	1	1	1	1	2	3	2	2	2	2	2	2	2	2	1	1	2	2	1	1	1	1
Astana	6	2	3	3	2	2	2	3	3	2	1	1	1	1	1	1	1	1	2	2	1	1	2	2	2	2
Tobol	1	3	4	4	3	5	4	4	4	4	4	4	3	4	4	3	3	3	3	3	3	3	3	3	3	3
Elimai	12	5	5	5	5	3	5	7	5	5	6	6	5	5	5	5	6	5	5	5	5	5	5	5	4	4
Aktobe	8	4	2	2	4	4	3	2	1	1	3	3	4	3	3	4	4	4	4	4	4	4	4	4	5	5
Jenis	8	10	8	7	10	10	10	10	11	12	13	12	9	9	8	8	7	8	8	8	7	7	8	6	6	6
Ordabasy	8	14	14	13	9	8	7	6	6	7	7	7	7	7	7	7	8	7	7	7	8	8	7	8	7	7
Okzhetpes	13	8	6	8	7	7	6	5	7	6	5	5	6	6	6	6	5	6	6	6	6	6	6	7	8	8
Kyzylzhar	6	11	11	11	8	6	9	9	8	8	8	8	8	8	9	9	9	9	9	9	9	9	9	9	9	9
Ulytau	13	12	11	14	14	14	14	14	14	13	12	11	11	12	12	11	12	12	12	12	13	12	10	10	10	10
Kaisar	8	12	10	12	12	11	11	12	10	10	10	9	10	11	11	12	11	10	11	11	11	11	12	12	11	11
Zhetysu	4	9	13	9	11	12	12	11	12	11	11	13	13	10	10	10	10	11	10	10	10	10	11	11	12	12
Atyrau	3	7	9	10	13	13	13	13	13	14	14	14	14	14	14	14	14	14	14	14	14	14	14	13	13	13
Turan	1	5	7	6	6	9	8	8	9	9	9	10	12	13	13	13	13	13	13	13	12	13	13	14	14	14

Leader and Champions League first qualifying round
Conference League first qualifying round
Relegation to 2026 Kazakhstan First Division

== Statistics ==
=== Scoring ===
- First goal of the season: Edige Oralbay for Atyrau against Elimai (2025)

==== Top scorers ====
Rank	Player	Club	Goals
1	(Albania) Nazmi Gripshi	Astana	16
2	(Kazakhstan) Dastan Satpayev	Kairat	14
3	(Croatia) Marin Tomasov	Astana	12
3	(Kazakhstan) Dauren Zhumat	Okzhetpes	12
5	(Nigeria) Geoffrey Chinedu	Astana	11
6	(Portugal) Jorginho	Kairat	10
7	(Kazakhstan) Islam Chesnokov	Tobol	9
7	(Guinea) Ousmane Camara	Astana	9
7	(Haiti) Jayro Jean	Aktobe	9
7	(Togo) Euloge Placca Fessou	Elimai	9

==== Hat-tricks ====
Player	For	Against	Result	Date
(Croatia) Marin Tomasov	Astana	Zhetsyu	3–0 (H)	30 March 2025
(Nigeria) Geoffrey Chinedu	Astana	Aktobe	5–3 (H)	19 October 2025

=== Top assists ===
Rank	Player	Club	Assists
1	(Croatia) Marin Tomasov	Astana	9
2	(Albania) Nazmi Gripshi	Astana	7
3	(Kazakhstan) Dastan Satpayev	Kairat	6
3	(Portugal) Jorginho	Kairat	6
3	(Croatia) Karlo Bartolec	Astana	6
3	(Guinea) Ousmane Camara	Astana	6
7	(Brazil) Adílio	Jenis	5
7	(Morocco) Ahmed El Messaoudi	Tobol	5
7	(Belarus) Valery Gromyko	Kairat	5
7	(Belarus) Vasily Sovpel	Atyrau	5
7	(Brazil) Everton	Ordabasy	5

=== Clean sheets ===
Rank	Player	Club	Clean sheets
1	(Romania) Andrei Vlad	Aktobe	9
1	(Belarus) Sergey Ignatovich	Jenis	9
3	(Belarus) Yegor Khatkevich	Turan (3); Atyrau (5)	8
4	(Kazakhstan) Danil Ustimenko	Tobol	7
4	(Kazakhstan) Bekkhan Shayzada	Ordabasy	7
4	(Ukraine) Maksym Koval	Elimai	7
4	(Kazakhstan) Temirlan Anarbekov	Kairat	7
8	(Kazakhstan) Mukhammedzhan Seysen	Astana	6
8	(Kazakhstan) Kazhymukan Tolepbergen	Okzhetpes	6
10	(Russia) Denis Kavlinov	Zhetysu	5
10	(Kazakhstan) Nurymzhan Salaidin	Kaisar	5

=== Discipline ===
==== Player ====
- Most yellow cards: 13
  - (Kazakhstan) Islambek Kuat (Jenis)
- Most red cards: 2
  - (Georgia (country)) Giorgi Gadrani (Atyrau)
  - (Kazakhstan) Zhasulan Moldakarayev (Ulytau)
  - (Nigeria) Raphael Success (Zhetsyu)

==== Club ====
- Most yellow cards: 81
  - Aktobe
- Most red cards: 7
  - Kyzylzhar
  - Kairat

=== Attendances ===
==== By round ====
2025 Kazakhstan Premier League Attendance
Round	Total	GP.	Avg. Per Game
Round 1	42,353	7	6,050
Round 2	24,964	7	3,566
Round 3	29,822	7	4,260
Round 4	25,774	7	3,682
Round 5	21,800	7	3,114
Round 6	35,247	7	5,035
Round 7	27,800	7	3,971
Round 8	48,400	7	6,914
Round 9	27,550	7	3,936
Round 10	35,399	7	5,057
Round 11	36,700	7	5,243
Round 12	27,253	7	3,893
Round 13	37,478	7	5,354
Round 14	30,230	7	4,319
Round 15	32,437	7	4,634
Round 16	22,900	7	3,271
Round 17	33,723	7	4,818
Round 18	25,440	7	3,634
Round 19	34,485	7	4,926
Round 20	40,700	7	5,814
Round 21	34,304	7	4,901
Round 22	39,685	7	5,669
Round 23	49,013	7	7,002
Round 24	47,300	7	6,757
Round 25	48,611	7	6,944
Round 26	52,600	7	7,514
Total	911,968	182	5,011

==== By team ====
Team \ Match played	1	2	3	4	5	6	7	8	9	10	11	12	13	14	15	16	17	18	19	20	21	22	23	24	25	26	Total	Average
Aktobe	—N/a	3,000	—N/a	3,000	—N/a	12,400	—N/a	12,400	—N/a	—N/a	12,400	—N/a	12,400	—N/a	11,500	—N/a	12,000	—N/a	12,300	—N/a	9,800	12,000	—N/a	6,500	—N/a	8,500	128,200	9,862
Astana	26,153	—N/a	8,922	10,052	—N/a	5,895	—N/a	7,200	—N/a	8,465	—N/a	5,953	—N/a	6,630	—N/a	—N/a	5,000	—N/a	6,800	—N/a	3,450	—N/a	15,233	—N/a	28,211	—N/a	137,964	10,613
Atyrau	1,500	—N/a	5,500	—N/a	2,500	—N/a	3,500	—N/a	2,500	3,000	—N/a	2,500	—N/a	3,000	—N/a	4,000	—N/a	3,000	—N/a	5,000	—N/a	—N/a	4,000	—N/a	3,700	—N/a	43,700	3,362
Kairat	—N/a	6,899	—N/a	5,342	—N/a	9,754	—N/a	9,150	—N/a	6,734	—N/a	—N/a	6,378	—N/a	5,137	—N/a	5,123	—N/a	4,785	—N/a	8,954	—N/a	22,800	23,800	—N/a	22,800	137,656	10,589
Kaisar	2,000	—N/a	2,000	—N/a	3,500	—N/a	3,800	—N/a	3,000	—N/a	3,500	3,500	—N/a	3,500	—N/a	3,200	—N/a	4,500	—N/a	6,500	—N/a	4,000	—N/a	—N/a	2,200	—N/a	45,200	3,477
Kyzylzhar	200	400	—N/a	200	—N/a	100	—N/a	7,000	—N/a	4,500	—N/a	4,000	—N/a	—N/a	3,500	—N/a	2,500	—N/a	2,500	—N/a	3,000	—N/a	2,000	—N/a	8,000	—N/a	37,900	2,915
Okzhetpes	—N/a	2,500	—N/a	3,500	—N/a	2,098	—N/a	—N/a	3,200	—N/a	2,800	—N/a	3,200	—N/a	300	—N/a	100	—N/a	3,000	2,700	—N/a	4,185	—N/a	2,500	—N/a	1,800	31,883	2,453
Ordabasy	7,000	—N/a	3,000	—N/a	1,900	2,000	—N/a	8,500	—N/a	9,000	—N/a	6,500	—N/a	10,000	—N/a	8,000	—N/a	—N/a	3,100	—N/a	5,000	—N/a	2,480	—N/a	2,000	—N/a	68,480	5,268
Tobol	3,000	—N/a	2,700	—N/a	3,000	—N/a	2,800	—N/a	4,000	—N/a	4,500	—N/a	4,000	3,500	—N/a	4,200	—N/a	7,000	—N/a	7,000	—N/a	4,000	—N/a	4,000	—N/a	—N/a	53,700	4,131
Turan	2,500	—N/a	3,700	—N/a	3,500	—N/a	1,400	1,150	—N/a	700	—N/a	800	—N/a	600	—N/a	1,000	—N/a	1,500	—N/a	—N/a	1,100	—N/a	1,500	—N/a	2,000	—N/a	21,450	1,650
Ulytau	—N/a	—N/a	4,000	—N/a	1,900	—N/a	3,800	—N/a	4,550	—N/a	2,500	—N/a	1,500	3,000	—N/a	2,000	—N/a	2,940	—N/a	2,500	—N/a	2,000	—N/a	2,000	—N/a	2,000	34,690	2,668
Elimai	—N/a	5,300	—N/a	3,480	—N/a	—N/a	8,000	—N/a	8,300	—N/a	8,500	—N/a	6,000	—N/a	7,000	—N/a	6,000	4,500	—N/a	8,500	—N/a	6,500	—N/a	6,500	—N/a	8,000	86,580	6,660
Zhenis	—N/a	6,565	—N/a	—N/a	5,500	—N/a	4,500	—N/a	2,000	—N/a	2,500	—N/a	4,000	—N/a	3,000	500	—N/a	2,000	—N/a	8,500	—N/a	7,000	—N/a	2,000	—N/a	8,500	56,565	4,351
Zhetysu	—N/a	300	—N/a	200	—N/a	3,000	—N/a	3,000	—N/a	3,000	—N/a	4,000	—N/a	—N/a	2,000	—N/a	3,000	—N/a	2,000	—N/a	3,000	—N/a	1,000	—N/a	2,500	1,000	28,000	2,154

== Awards ==
=== Annual awards ===
Award	Winner	Club
Player of the Year	(Kazakhstan) Dastan Satpayev	Kairat
Goalkeeper of the Year	(Kazakhstan) Temirlan Anarbekov	Kairat
Defender of the Year	(Kazakhstan) Bagdat Kairov	Aktobe
Midfielder of the Year	(Kazakhstan) Galymzhan Kenzhebek	Elimai
Forward of the Year	(Kazakhstan) Islam Chesnokov	Tobol
Top scorer of the Year	(Albania) Nazmi Gripshi	Astana
Under-21 Player of the Year	(Kazakhstan) Dastan Satpayev	Kairat
Breakthrough of the Year	(Kazakhstan) Dauren Zhumat	Okzhetpes
Coach of the Year	(Kazakhstan) Rafael Urazbakhtin	Kairat
