= List of Kazakhstan football transfers winter 2024–25 =

This is a list of Kazakh football transfers during the 2024 winter transfer window.

== Kazakhstan Premier League 2025 ==
=== Aktobe ===
In: Note: Flags indicate national team as defined under FIFA eligibility rules; some limited exceptions apply. Players may hold more than one non-FIFA nationality.

No.	Pos.	Nation	Player
2	DF	KAZ	Lev Skvortsov (on loan from (Russia) Khimki)
9	FW	SRB	Djordje Ivkovic (from (North Macedonia) Brera Strumica)
11	FW	KAZ	Aybar Abdulla (from (Kazakhstan) Shakhter Karagandy)
18	MF	HAI	Jayro Jean (from (Kuwait) Qadsia)
19	FW	KAZ	Oralkhan Omirtayev (from (Belarus) BATE Borisov)
21	DF	SRB	Nemanja Anđelković (from (Russia) Khimki)
22	FW	KAZ	Yerkebulan Seydakhmet (from (Kazakhstan) Kairat)
25	GK	ROU	Andrei Vlad (from (Romania) FCSB)
66	FW	NGA	Mario Rabiu (from (Albania) Skënderbeu Korçë)
91	DF	KAZ	Sayat Zhumagali (from (Kazakhstan) Ulytau)

Out: Note: Flags indicate national team as defined under FIFA eligibility rules; some limited exceptions apply. Players may hold more than one non-FIFA nationality.

No.	Pos.	Nation	Player
3	MF	BLR	Dmitry Bessmertny (to (Russia) Kuban Krasnodar)
5	MF	ARG	Leonel Strumia (to (Cyprus) AEL Limassol)
16	MF	ECU	José Cevallos (to (Ecuador) El Nacional)
17	FW	DOM	Dorny Romero (to (Bolivia) Club Bolívar)
18	MF	HAI	Jayro Jean (to (Kuwait) Qadsia)
30	GK	KAZ	Igor Shatsky (to (Kazakhstan) Shakhter Karagandy)
44	DF	CRO	Mateo Barać (to (Croatia) NK Varaždin)
80	MF	KAZ	Arman Kenesov (to (Kazakhstan) Astana)

=== Astana ===
In: Note: Flags indicate national team as defined under FIFA eligibility rules; some limited exceptions apply. Players may hold more than one non-FIFA nationality.

No.	Pos.	Nation	Player
8	MF	KAZ	Arman Kenesov (from (Kazakhstan) Aktobe)
19	DF	KAZ	Dmitry Shomko (from (Kazakhstan) Elimai)
—	GK	KAZ	Danila Karpikov (from (Kazakhstan) Shakhter Karagandy)

Out: Note: Flags indicate national team as defined under FIFA eligibility rules; some limited exceptions apply. Players may hold more than one non-FIFA nationality.

No.	Pos.	Nation	Player
8	MF	KAZ	Islambek Kuat (to (Kazakhstan) Zhenis)
19	MF	GHA	Barnes Osei (to (Israel) Bnei Sakhnin)
27	DF	KAZ	Timur Dosmagambetov (to (Kazakhstan) Okzhetpes)
55	GK	KAZ	Aleksandr Zarutskiy (to (Kazakhstan) Kairat)
—	MF	SRB	Dušan Jovančić (to (Serbia) Čukarički, previously on loan to (Kazakhstan) Kyzylzhar)
—	FW	KAZ	Vladislav Prokopenko (to (Kazakhstan) Okzhetpes, previously on loan to (Kazakhstan) Zhenis)

=== Atyrau ===
In: Note: Flags indicate national team as defined under FIFA eligibility rules; some limited exceptions apply. Players may hold more than one non-FIFA nationality.

No.	Pos.	Nation	Player
2	DF	TJK	Fakhriddin Akhtamov (from (Tajikistan) Khujand)
4	DF	GEO	Gia Chaduneli (from (Kazakhstan) Zhetysu)
5	MF	POR	Guilherme Morais (from (Finland) Haka)
7	FW	RUS	Yevgeni Kozlov (from (Kazakhstan) Shakhter Karagandy)
8	MF	GEO	Zaza Tsitskishvili (from (Georgia (country)) Gagra)
9	FW	KAZ	Bakdaulet Zulfikarov (from (Kazakhstan) Caspiy)
13	DF	KAZ	Miram Sapanov (from (Kazakhstan) Ulytau)
14	DF	KAZ	Eskendir Kybyray (from (Kazakhstan) Shakhter Karagandy)
17	FW	KAZ	Shokhan Abzalov (from (Kazakhstan) Kyzylzhar)
18	FW	KAZ	Yan Trufanov (on loan from (Kazakhstan) Kairat)
21	DF	KAZ	Ravil Atykhanov (from (Kazakhstan) Zhetysu)
23	DF	KAZ	Amandyk Nabikhanov (from (Kazakhstan) Caspiy)
31	GK	KAZ	Sanzhar Erniyazov (from (Kazakhstan) Zhetysu)
44	DF	GEO	Giorgi Gadrani (from (Tajikistan) Khosilot Farkhor)
45	GK	RUS	Arsen Siukayev (from (Kazakhstan) Zhetysu)
55	MF	BLR	Nikita Kaplenko (from (Russia) Sokol Saratov)
72	DF	KAZ	Mikael Askarov (from (Belarus) Smorgon)
79	MF	KAZ	Roman Chirkov (from (Kazakhstan) Akzhayik)
—	FW	GEO	Giorgi Nikabadze (from (Uzbekistan) Navbahor)

Out: Note: Flags indicate national team as defined under FIFA eligibility rules; some limited exceptions apply. Players may hold more than one non-FIFA nationality.

No.	Pos.	Nation	Player
1	GK	BLR	Yegor Khatkevich (to (Kazakhstan) Turan)
2	DF	KAZ	Adi Adambaev (to (Kazakhstan) Elimai)
4	DF	KAZ	Adilbek Zhumakhanov (to (Kazakhstan) Elimai)
7	MF	SVN	Jakob Novak (to (Romania) Oțelul Galați)
8	DF	RUS	Soslan Takulov (to (Kazakhstan) Zhetysu)
9	MF	TJK	Khusrav Toirov (loan return to (Ukraine) Shakhtar Donetsk)
11	MF	KAZ	Aslan Adil (to (Kazakhstan) Zhenis)
13	FW	BLR	Nikolay Signevich (to (Kazakhstan) Tobol)
17	FW	COD	Joel Kayamba
18	DF	BLR	Nikita Stepanov (to (Belarus) Dinamo Brest)
19	MF	KAZ	Gevorg Najaryan
21	MF	KAZ	Nauryzbek Zhagorov (to (Kazakhstan) Tobol)
22	MF	BLR	Igor Stasevich (to (Kazakhstan) Turan)
26	DF	KAZ	Olzhas Kerimzhanov (to (Kazakhstan) Shakhter Karagandy)
55	MF	UKR	Oleksandr Noyok (to (Kazakhstan) Kyzylzhar)
63	MF	TJK	Fatkhullo Olimzoda
90	GK	KAZ	Vladislav Saenko

=== Elimai ===
In: Note: Flags indicate national team as defined under FIFA eligibility rules; some limited exceptions apply. Players may hold more than one non-FIFA nationality.

No.	Pos.	Nation	Player
2	DF	KAZ	Adi Adambaev (from (Kazakhstan) Atyrau)
4	DF	KAZ	Adilbek Zhumakhanov (from (Kazakhstan) Atyrau)
8	MF	RUS	Roman Tugarev (from (Russia) Rostov)
9	FW	SRB	Fejsal Mulić (from (South Korea) Suwon Samsung Bluewings)
15	DF	SRB	Nemanja Ćalasan (from (Serbia) Spartak Subotica)
21	DF	URU	Kevin Rolón (from (Uruguay) Montevideo Wanderers)
22	GK	KAZ	Nikita Pivkin (from (Kazakhstan) Kairat)
25	DF	KAZ	Egor Tkachenko (on loan from (Kazakhstan) Kairat)
27	MF	ROU	Eduard Florescu (from (Romania) Botoșani)
28	MF	KAZ	Serikzhan Muzhikov (from (Kazakhstan) Zhetysu)
34	MF	KAZ	Abylaykhan Nazymkhanov (from (Kazakhstan) Shakhter Karagandy)
40	GK	KAZ	Yegor Tsuprikov (from (Kazakhstan) Shakhter Karagandy)
44	MF	KAZ	Almas Tyulyubay (from (Kazakhstan) Shakhter Karagandy)
77	FW	TOG	Euloge Placca Fessou (from (South Korea) Jeonnam Dragons)
—	DF	BRA	Enzo
—	MF	BLR	Yevgeny Beryozkin (from (Kazakhstan) Kyzylzhar)

Out: Note: Flags indicate national team as defined under FIFA eligibility rules; some limited exceptions apply. Players may hold more than one non-FIFA nationality.

No.	Pos.	Nation	Player
1	GK	KAZ	Rakhat Mavlikeev
4	DF	RUS	Daniil Penchikov (to (Russia) Arsenal Tula)
5	DF	KAZ	Sergey Keiler (to (Kazakhstan) Ulytau)
8	MF	KAZ	Yury Pertsukh (to (Kazakhstan) Shakhter Karagandy)
9	FW	RUS	Islam Mashukov (to (Uzbekistan) Andijon)
10	MF	KAZ	Yerkebulan Nurgaliyev (to (Kazakhstan) Irtysh Pavlodar)
12	MF	KAZ	Aslan Darabayev (to (Kazakhstan) Okzhetpes)
15	DF	KAZ	Dmitriy Schmidt (to (Kazakhstan) Zhetysu)
19	DF	KAZ	Mikhail Gabyshev (to (Kazakhstan) Shakhter Karagandy)
20	FW	BRA	China (to (Vietnam) Thep Xanh Nam Dinh)
21	DF	KAZ	Sultan Abilgazy (to (Kazakhstan) Okzhetpes)
24	MF	DOM	Edarlyn Reyes (to (Russia) Arsenal Tula)
63	MF	BIH	Ivan Šaravanja
77	DF	KAZ	Dmitry Shomko (to (Kazakhstan) Astana)
78	GK	RUS	Denis Kavlinov (to (Kazakhstan) Zhetysu)
88	DF	RUS	Dmitri Yashin (to (Russia) Kuban Krasnodar)
92	MF	FRA	Quentin Cornette
—	DF	KAZ	Bakytzhan Malikov (released, previously on loan to (Kazakhstan) Altai)
—	FW	KAZ	Arman Smailov (released, previously on loan to (Kazakhstan) Irtysh Pavlodar)

=== Kairat ===
In: Note: Flags indicate national team as defined under FIFA eligibility rules; some limited exceptions apply. Players may hold more than one non-FIFA nationality.

No.	Pos.	Nation	Player
1	GK	KAZ	Alexander Zarutsky (from (Kazakhstan) Astana)
3	DF	POR	Luís Mata (from (Poland) Zagłębie Lubin)
7	FW	POR	Jorginho (from (Luxembourg) Differdange 03)
18	DF	ISR	Dan Glazer (from (Russia) Pari Nizhny Novgorod)
20	MF	KAZ	Yerkin Tapalov (from (Kazakhstan) Tobol)
25	DF	KAZ	Aleksandr Shirobokov (loan return from (Belarus) Slavia Mozyr)
77	GK	KAZ	Temirlan Anarbekov (loan return from (Kazakhstan) Zhenis)

Out: Note: Flags indicate national team as defined under FIFA eligibility rules; some limited exceptions apply. Players may hold more than one non-FIFA nationality.

No.	Pos.	Nation	Player
1	GK	KAZ	Danil Ustimenko (to (Kazakhstan) Tobol)
2	DF	KAZ	Egor Tkachenko (on loan to (Kazakhstan) Elimai, previously on loan to (Kazakhstan) Zhetysu)
3	DF	UZB	Ibrokhimkhalil Yuldoshev (loan return to (Russia) Pari NN)
9	FW	KAZ	Vyacheslav Shvyryov (to (Kazakhstan) Ordabasy)
20	MF	RUS	Dmitry Sergeyev (to (Russia) Arsenal Tula)
21	MF	KAZ	Arsen Buranchiev (to (Kazakhstan) Kyzylzhar)
22	MF	KAZ	Yerkebulan Seydakhmet (to (Kazakhstan) Aktobe)
23	MF	KAZ	Andrey Ulshin (to (Kazakhstan) Kyzylzhar)
27	GK	KAZ	Nikita Pivkin (to (Kazakhstan) Elimai)
30	GK	RUS	Vadim Ulyanov (to (Russia) Akhmat Grozny)
—	FW	KAZ	Gleb Valgushev (on loan to (Kazakhstan) Kyzylzhar)
—	MF	KAZ	Daniyar Usenov (to (Kazakhstan) Tobol)
—	FW	KAZ	Yan Trufanov (on loan to (Kazakhstan) Atyrau, previously on loan to (Kazakhstan) Zhenis)

=== Kaisar ===
In: Note: Flags indicate national team as defined under FIFA eligibility rules; some limited exceptions apply. Players may hold more than one non-FIFA nationality.

No.	Pos.	Nation	Player
2	DF	KAZ	Temirlan Murzagaliev (from (Kazakhstan) Kaisar)
8	DF	KAZ	Aybol Abiken (from (Kazakhstan) Ordabasy)
23	DF	KAZ	Zhalgas Zhaksylykov (from (Kazakhstan) Okzhetpes)
27	DF	KAZ	Nikita Gubarev (from (Russia) Lada-Tolyatti)
35	GK	KAZ	Aleksandr Mokin (from (Kazakhstan) Caspiy)
74	DF	KAZ	Roman Bozhko (from (Kazakhstan) Tobol)
99	FW	KAZ	Nurdaulet Agzambaev (from (Kazakhstan) Khan Tengri)
—	MF	KAZ	Alibi Tuzakbaev (loan return from (Kazakhstan) Khan Tengri)

Out: Note: Flags indicate national team as defined under FIFA eligibility rules; some limited exceptions apply. Players may hold more than one non-FIFA nationality.

No.	Pos.	Nation	Player
6	MF	BLR	Ruslan Yudenkov (to (Kazakhstan) Turan)
9	MF	BLR	Dzmitry Baradzin (to (Belarus) Gomel)
11	MF	CMR	Junior Kameni
12	FW	KAZ	Toktar Zhangylyshbay (to (Kazakhstan) Kyzylzhar)
13	MF	KAZ	Ruslan Sakhalbaev (Retired)
18	DF	UKR	Vitaliy Pryndeta
15	DF	KAZ	Askar Satyshev (to (Kazakhstan) Turan)
20	MF	MNE	Goran Milojko (to (Kazakhstan) Turan)
25	DF	GEO	Giorgi Kobuladze (to (Georgia (country)) Iberia 1999)
30	FW	UZB	Shokhnazar Norbekov
44	DF	MNE	Jovan Pajović (to (Kazakhstan) Turan)
55	GK	ARM	Aram Ayrapetyan
77	MF	BLR	Vasily Sovpel (to (Kazakhstan) Turan)
88	GK	MDA	Ștefan Sicaci (to (Georgia (country)) Dinamo Tbilisi)

=== Kyzylzhar ===
In: Note: Flags indicate national team as defined under FIFA eligibility rules; some limited exceptions apply. Players may hold more than one non-FIFA nationality.

No.	Pos.	Nation	Player
6	DF	MNE	Ilija Martinović (from (Montenegro) Sutjeska Nikšić)
8	MF	KAZ	Andrey Ulshin (from (Kazakhstan) Kairat)
9	MF	KAZ	Ruslan Valiullin (from (Kazakhstan) Tobol)
10	FW	KAZ	Toktar Zhangylyshbay (from (Kazakhstan) Kaisar)
11	MF	KAZ	Artem Cheredinov (loan return from (Kazakhstan) Zhenis)
12	MF	KAZ	Madi Zhakipbayev (from (Kazakhstan) Khan-Tengri)
14	MF	KAZ	Samat Zharynbetov (from (Kazakhstan) Ordabasy)
19	DF	KAZ	Asylbek Asan (from (Kazakhstan) Taraz)
21	MF	KAZ	Arsen Buranchiev (from (Kazakhstan) Kairat)
22	DF	UKR	Anatoliy Kozlenko (from (Kyrgyzstan) Dordoi Bishkek)
25	DF	CIV	Abdoul Aziz Toure (from (Belarus) Smorgon)
28	MF	MNE	Darko Zorić (from (Montenegro) Mornar)
41	GK	RUS	Miroslav Lobantsev (from (Kazakhstan) Zhenis)
44	DF	RUS	Andrei Vasilyev (from (Belarus) Neman Grodno)
55	MF	UKR	Oleksandr Noyok (from (Kazakhstan) Atyrau)
77	DF	KAZ	Dmitry Miroshnichenko (from (Kazakhstan) Okzhetpes)
79	FW	KAZ	Gleb Valgushev (on loan from (Kazakhstan) Kairat)
84	MF	CIV	Néné Gbamblé (from (Russia) Torpedo Moscow)
99	DF	KAZ	Elisey Gorshunov (from (Kazakhstan) Okzhetpes)

Out: Note: Flags indicate national team as defined under FIFA eligibility rules; some limited exceptions apply. Players may hold more than one non-FIFA nationality.

No.	Pos.	Nation	Player
2	DF	KAZ	Ular Zhaksybaev (to (Kazakhstan) Ordabasy)
8	MF	KAZ	Rafail Ospanov (to Shakhter Karagandy)
9	MF	UKR	Oleksiy Shchebetun
10	MF	UKR	Yuriy Bushman
11	MF	BIH	Andrija Drijo (to (Slovenia) Gorica)
14	DF	KAZ	Ardak Saulet (to (Kazakhstan) Zhenis)
17	DF	KAZ	Miras Jenis
18	MF	KAZ	Zhantore Moldabaev
19	MF	GEO	Luka Imnadze (to (Kazakhstan) Ordabasy)
23	DF	CRO	Zoran Nižić (to (Croatia) HNK Šibenik)
27	MF	BLR	Yevgeny Beryozkin (to (Kazakhstan) Elimai)
29	MF	SRB	Dušan Jovančić (loan return to (Kazakhstan) Astana)
30	GK	KAZ	Aleksandr Dovgal (to (Russia) Tyumen)
35	DF	LVA	Vladislavs Sorokins
55	DF	MDA	Artiom Litveacov (to (Tajikistan) Ravshan Kulob)
77	FW	KAZ	Shokhan Abzalov (to (Kazakhstan) Atyrau)
88	MF	KAZ	Madi Khaseyn (to (Kazakhstan) Zhenis)
91	MF	POR	Rúben Brígido

=== Okzhetpes ===
In: Note: Flags indicate national team as defined under FIFA eligibility rules; some limited exceptions apply. Players may hold more than one non-FIFA nationality.

No.	Pos.	Nation	Player
2	MF	KAZ	Arsen Ashirbek (from (Kazakhstan) Taraz)
3	DF	KAZ	Nurlan Dairov (from (Kazakhstan) Zhetysu)
5	DF	KAZ	Sanzhar Satanov (from (Kazakhstan) Turan)
7	FW	KAZ	Damir Marat (from (Kazakhstan) Caspiy)
8	MF	KAZ	Aslan Darabayev (from (Kazakhstan) Elimai)
9	FW	KAZ	Shyngys Flyuk (from (Kazakhstan) Ulytau)
14	MF	KAZ	Adam Adakhadzhiev (from (Kazakhstan) SD Family)
16	GK	UKR	Oleksiy Shevchenko
19	FW	KAZ	Vladislav Prokopenko (from (Kazakhstan) Astana)
21	DF	KAZ	Sultan Abilgazy (from (Kazakhstan) Elimai)
24	MF	SRB	Nikola Cuckić (from (Kazakhstan) Turan)
27	MF	KAZ	Timur Dosmagambetov (from (Kazakhstan) Astana)
28	DF	KAZ	Viktor Gunchenko (from (Kazakhstan) Ulytau)
77	MF	SRB	Strahinja Jovanović (from (Bosnia and Herzegovina) Radnik Bijeljina)
—	GK	KAZ	Vladislav Saenko (from (Kazakhstan) Atyrau)

Out: Note: Flags indicate national team as defined under FIFA eligibility rules; some limited exceptions apply. Players may hold more than one non-FIFA nationality.

No.	Pos.	Nation	Player
3	DF	KAZ	Zhalgas Zhaksylykov (to (Kazakhstan) Kaisar)
6	MF	KAZ	Olzhas Adil
7	DF	KAZ	Dmitry Miroshnichenko (to (Kazakhstan) Kyzylzhar)
8	MF	KAZ	Miras Tuliev
9	FW	KAZ	Shakhmarz Arsamakov
13	FW	KAZ	Igor Gagaev
14	DF	KAZ	Alikhan Serikbay (to (Kazakhstan) Caspiy)
17	MF	KAZ	Salamat Zhumabekov
20	DF	KAZ	Maksat Amirkhanov
23	DF	KAZ	Elisey Gorshunov (to (Kazakhstan) Kyzylzhar)
24	GK	KAZ	Ruslan Abzhanov
27	MF	KAZ	Nurdaulet Izbasarov
30	FW	KAZ	Raul Allakhverdiev (loan return to (Kazakhstan) Zhenis)
77	MF	KAZ	Zakhar Porokh (to (Kazakhstan) Okzhetpes)

=== Ordabasy ===
In: Note: Flags indicate national team as defined under FIFA eligibility rules; some limited exceptions apply. Players may hold more than one non-FIFA nationality.

No.	Pos.	Nation	Player
4	DF	MDA	Victor Mudrac (from (Moldova) Petrocub Hîncești)
5	DF	KAZ	Ular Zhaksybaev (from (Kazakhstan) Kyzylzhar)
6	DF	SRB	Nikola Antić (from (Serbia) Partizan)
7	MF	GEO	Luka Imnadze (from (Kazakhstan) Kyzylzhar)
9	FW	BRA	Everton Moraes (from (Brazil) Bahia)
10	FW	KAZ	Vyacheslav Shvyryov (from (Kazakhstan) Kairat)
14	DF	CIV	Sherif Jimoh (from (Belarus) BATE Borisov)
18	MF	GHA	Rashid Abubakar (from (Moldova) Spartanii Sportul)
23	MF	KAZ	Murodzhon Khalmatov (loan return from (Kazakhstan) Caspiy)
27	MF	CRO	Dario Čanađija (from (Romania) Gloria Buzău)
34	GK	MDA	Dumitru Celeadnic (from (Moldova) Sheriff Tiraspol)
77	FW	NGA	Kayode Saliman (on loan from (Slovakia) Železiarne Podbrezová)

Out: Note: Flags indicate national team as defined under FIFA eligibility rules; some limited exceptions apply. Players may hold more than one non-FIFA nationality.

No.	Pos.	Nation	Player
2	DF	BRA	Reginaldo (to (Brazil) Juventude)
3	DF	COL	Cristian Tovar (loan return to (Moldova) Sheriff Tiraspol)
4	MF	CRO	Lovro Cvek (to (Croatia) Šibenik)
5	DF	KAZ	Gafurzhan Suyumbayev (to (Kazakhstan) Irtysh Pavlodar)
6	DF	KAZ	Aybol Abiken (to (Kazakhstan) Kaisar)
7	MF	UZB	Shokhboz Umarov (to (Kazakhstan) Turan)
9	MF	KAZ	Bauyrzhan Islamkhan (to (Kazakhstan) Turan)
10	FW	UZB	Jasurbek Yakhshiboev
11	MF	KAZ	Maksim Fedin (to (Kazakhstan) Irtysh Pavlodar)
14	MF	KAZ	Samat Zharynbetov (to (Kazakhstan) Kyzylzhar)
16	DF	KAZ	Alikhan Uteshev
17	DF	SRB	Zlatan Šehović (loan return to (Serbia) Partizan)
19	MF	UKR	Yevhen Makarenko
23	DF	KAZ	Temirlan Yerlanov (to (Kazakhstan) Tobol)
30	FW	BLR	Vsevolod Sadovsky
32	DF	UKR	Ihor Plastun
35	GK	KAZ	Azamat Zhomartov
41	FW	UKR	Artem Byesyedin (to (Czech Republic) Líšeň)
71	GK	BLR	Sergey Ignatovich (to (Kazakhstan) Zhenis)

=== Tobol ===
In: Note: Flags indicate national team as defined under FIFA eligibility rules; some limited exceptions apply. Players may hold more than one non-FIFA nationality.

No.	Pos.	Nation	Player
14	FW	BLR	Nikolay Signevich (from (Kazakhstan) Atyrau)
15	DF	MNE	Marko Vukčević (from (Bosnia and Herzegovina) Borac Banja Luka)
16	MF	BRA	Victor Braga (from (Hungary) Debreceni VSC)
19	MF	KAZ	Daniyar Usenov (from (Kazakhstan) Kairat)
22	MF	KAZ	Meyrambek Kalmyrza (from (Kazakhstan) Zhetysu)
23	DF	KAZ	Temirlan Yerlanov (from (Kazakhstan) Ordabasy)
27	MF	KAZ	Nauryzbek Zhagorov (from (Kazakhstan) Atyrau)
44	GK	KAZ	Danil Ustimenko (from (Kazakhstan) Kairat)

Out: Note: Flags indicate national team as defined under FIFA eligibility rules; some limited exceptions apply. Players may hold more than one non-FIFA nationality.

No.	Pos.	Nation	Player
1	GK	KAZ	Stas Pokatilov (to (Azerbaijan) Sabah)
4	DF	KAZ	Ermek Abdulla
10	MF	SRB	Igor Ivanović
15	DF	RUS	Albert Gabarayev (to (Russia) Fakel Voronezh)
16	MF	KAZ	Yerkin Tapalov (to (Kazakhstan) Kairat)
17	DF	KAZ	Timur Zhakupov
19	MF	KAZ	Ruslan Valiullin (to (Kazakhstan) Kyzylzhar)
20	FW	POR	Rui Costa (to (Portugal) Farense)
25	DF	KAZ	Roman Bozhko (to (Kazakhstan) Kaisar)
99	MF	POR	Pedro Eugénio

=== Turan ===
In: Note: Flags indicate national team as defined under FIFA eligibility rules; some limited exceptions apply. Players may hold more than one non-FIFA nationality.

No.	Pos.	Nation	Player
1	GK	BLR	Yegor Khatkevich (from (Kazakhstan) Atyrau)
2	DF	UZB	Odil Abdumazhidov (from (Uzbekistan) Metallurg Bekabad)
5	DF	KAZ	Askar Satyshev (from (Kazakhstan) Kaisar)
6	DF	BLR	Ruslan Yudenkov (from (Kazakhstan) Atyrau)
7	MF	UZB	Shokhboz Umarov (from (Kazakhstan) Ordabasy)
8	MF	UZB	Behruzbek Askarov (on loan from (Uzbekistan) Pakhtakor)
9	FW	KAZ	Abylaykhan Zhumabek (from (Kazakhstan) Zhetysu)
10	MF	KAZ	Bauyrzhan Islamkhan (from (Kazakhstan) Ordabasy)
11	MF	KAZ	Erkebulan Toybekov (from (Kazakhstan) Taraz)
13	DF	KAZ	Sagi Malikaydar (from (Kazakhstan) Jetisay)
15	FW	RUS	Luka Zgurski (from (Uzbekistan) Andijon)
17	MF	KAZ	Abinur Nurymbet (from (Uzbekistan) Andijon)
19	MF	KAZ	Erasyl Sarsenbay (loan return from (Kazakhstan) Ulytau)
20	MF	MNE	Goran Milojko (from (Kazakhstan) Kaisar)
22	MF	BLR	Igor Stasevich (from (Kazakhstan) Atyrau)
27	GK	KAZ	Miras Mukhambetzhanuly (from (Kazakhstan) Jetisay)
44	DF	MNE	Jovan Pajovic (from (Kazakhstan) Kaisar)
71	MF	BLR	Vasily Sovpel (from (Kazakhstan) Kaisar)
77	DF	UZB	Khurshidbek Mukhtorov (from (Uzbekistan) Neftchi Fergana)
89	FW	RUS	Konstantin Dorofeyev (from (Russia) Krasnodar-2)

Out: Note: Flags indicate national team as defined under FIFA eligibility rules; some limited exceptions apply. Players may hold more than one non-FIFA nationality.

No.	Pos.	Nation	Player
1	GK	KAZ	Dinmukhammed Zhomart (to (Kazakhstan) Zhenis)
2	DF	SRB	Marko Nikolić (to (Azerbaijan) Sabail)
4	MF	KAZ	Sanzhar Satanov (to (Kazakhstan) Okzhetpes)
10	FW	MKD	Aleksandar Mishov (to (North Macedonia) GFK Tikvesh)
11	MF	KAZ	Maksim Vaganov (to (Kazakhstan) Irtysh Pavlodar)
13	FW	RUS	Pavel Kireyenko (to (Armenia) Alashkert)
15	DF	MKD	Viktor Velkoski
16	GK	BLR	Vladislav Vasilyuchek
17	MF	CRO	Antonio Jakoliš
21	DF	KAZ	Berik Shaikhov (to (Kazakhstan) Zhetysu)
22	FW	RUS	Artyom Arkhipov (to (Armenia) Alashkert)
23	MF	KAZ	Rifat Nurmugamet (to (Kazakhstan) Shakhter Karagandy)
24	MF	SRB	Nikola Cuckić (to (Kazakhstan) Okzhetpes)
31	DF	RUS	Ivan Khomukha (to (Russia) Volgar Astrakhan)

=== Ulytau ===
In: Note: Flags indicate national team as defined under FIFA eligibility rules; some limited exceptions apply. Players may hold more than one non-FIFA nationality.

No.	Pos.	Nation	Player
1	GK	KAZ	Dmytro Nepohodov (from (Ukraine) Podillya Khmelnytskyi)
3	DF	KAZ	Sergey Keiler (from (Kazakhstan) Elimai)
6	DF	UKR	Yaroslav Terekhov (from (Moldova) Milsami Orhei)
7	DF	KAZ	Dinmukhammed Kashken (from (Kazakhstan) Khan Tengri)
8	MF	UKR	Beka Vachiberadze
9	FW	MDA	Nicolai Solodovnicov (from (Lithuania) Sūduva)
11	FW	KAZ	Bayzhan Madelkhan (from (Kazakhstan) SD Family)
15	FW	KAZ	Bagdat Daniyarov (from (Kazakhstan) SD Family)
19	DF	ESP	José Carrillo (from (Georgia (country)) Samtredia)
20	MF	KAZ	Ramazan Abylaykhan (from (Kazakhstan) Jetisay)
23	DF	KAZ	Dominik Bolovintsev
28	DF	RUS	Georgi Bugulov (from (Belarus) Slavia Mozyr)
40	GK	KAZ	Stanislav Shcherbakov (from (Kazakhstan) Taraz)
95	MF	MDA	Vadim Paireli (from (Moldova) Sheriff Tiraspol)

Out: Note: Flags indicate national team as defined under FIFA eligibility rules; some limited exceptions apply. Players may hold more than one non-FIFA nationality.

No.	Pos.	Nation	Player
1	GK	KAZ	Ersultan Smaylov
3	DF	KAZ	Viktor Gunchenko (to (Kazakhstan) Okzhetpes)
7	MF	KAZ	Danabek Kuanyshbay
8	MF	KAZ	Azamat Kalymbetov
10	FW	KAZ	Nurbol Anuarbekov (loan return to (Kazakhstan) Zhenis)
11	FW	KAZ	Shyngys Flyuk (to (Kazakhstan) Okzhetpes)
13	DF	KAZ	Miram Sapanov (to (Kazakhstan) Atyrau)
15	DF	KAZ	Sayat Zhumagali (to (Kazakhstan) Aktobe)
15	FW	KAZ	Bauyrzhan Turysbek
18	DF	KAZ	Rustam Zhankhaev
19	DF	KAZ	Azamat Erden (loan return to (Kazakhstan) Taraz)
20	MF	KAZ	Erasyl Burkitbaev
20	MF	KAZ	Anatoliy Krasotin (to (Kazakhstan) Irtysh Pavlodar)
27	DF	KAZ	Nurali Mamirbaev
31	MF	KAZ	Miras Dilmurat
77	MF	KAZ	Erasyl Sarsenbay (loan return to (Kazakhstan) Turan)
91	GK	KAZ	Zhandar Zhangaliev

=== Zhenis ===
In: Note: Flags indicate national team as defined under FIFA eligibility rules; some limited exceptions apply. Players may hold more than one non-FIFA nationality.

No.	Pos.	Nation	Player
1	GK	BLR	Sergey Ignatovich (from (Kazakhstan) Ordabasy)
7	MF	KAZ	Islambek Kuat (from (Kazakhstan) Astana)
8	MF	KAZ	Dinmukhamed Karaman (from (Kazakhstan) Zhetysu)
9	FW	KAZ	Khamza Yakudi (from (Lithuania) Babrungas Plungė)
11	MF	KAZ	Aslan Adil (from (Kazakhstan) Atyrau)
14	DF	KAZ	Ardak Saulet (from (Kazakhstan) Kyzylzhar)
23	DF	KAZ	Askhat Baltabekov (from (Kazakhstan) Zhetysu)
24	GK	KAZ	Dinmukhammed Zhomart (from (Kazakhstan) Turan)
33	MF	CYP	Konstantinos Venizelou (from (Cyprus) Ethnikos Achna)
77	FW	KAZ	Nurbol Anuarbekov (loan return from (Kazakhstan) Ulytau)
88	MF	KAZ	Madi Khaseyn (from (Kazakhstan) Kyzylzhar)
91	DF	KAZ	Berik Aytbaev (from (Kazakhstan) Elimai)

Out: Note: Flags indicate national team as defined under FIFA eligibility rules; some limited exceptions apply. Players may hold more than one non-FIFA nationality.

No.	Pos.	Nation	Player
1	GK	RUS	Miroslav Lobantsev (to (Kazakhstan) Kyzylzhar)
7	MF	KAZ	Bauyrzhan Baytana (to (Kazakhstan) Caspiy)
9	FW	KAZ	Yan Trufanov (loan return to (Kazakhstan) Kairat)
11	FW	POR	Bruno Silva (to (Portugal) Oliveirense)
14	FW	GEO	Giorgi Pantsulaia (to (Georgia (country)) Samgurali Tsqaltubo)
17	MF	KAZ	Artem Cheredinov (loan return to (Kazakhstan) Kyzylzhar)
18	MF	BLR	Sergey Volkov (to (Russia) Kuban Krasnodar)
22	MF	BLR	Denis Grechikho (loan return to (Belarus) BATE Borisov)
32	MF	CZE	Lukáš Budínský (to (Czech Republic) 1. SK Prostějov)
41	GK	KAZ	Temirlan Anarbekov (loan return to (Kazakhstan) Kairat)
54	DF	CRO	Marin Belančić (to (Bosnia and Herzegovina) HŠK Posušje)
60	MF	POR	João Oliveira (to (Portugal) AD Fafe)
80	FW	KAZ	Vladislav Prokopenko (loan return to (Kazakhstan) Astana)
—	FW	KAZ	Raul Allakhverdiev (released, previously on loan to (Kazakhstan) Okzhetpes)

=== Zhetysu ===
In: Note: Flags indicate national team as defined under FIFA eligibility rules; some limited exceptions apply. Players may hold more than one non-FIFA nationality.

No.	Pos.	Nation	Player
5	DF	BLR	Maksim Kovel (from (Belarus) Isloch Minsk Raion)
6	DF	KAZ	Aslan Akhmedov (from (Kazakhstan) Kairat-Zhastar)
8	MF	KAZ	Alen Aymanov (from (Kazakhstan) Caspiy)
9	MF	SLE	Saidu Fofanah (from (Senegal) AS Pikine)
10	DF	RUS	Soslan Takulov (from (Kazakhstan) Atyrau)
11	MF	RUS	Alan Chochiyev (from (Russia) Alania Vladikavkaz)
12	DF	KAZ	Maksat Taykenov (from (Kazakhstan) Caspiy)
15	DF	KAZ	Dmitriy Schmidt (from (Kazakhstan) Elimai)
14	MF	KAZ	Zhansultan Mukhametkhanov (from (Kazakhstan) Zhas Kyran)
17	MF	KAZ	David Esimbekov (on loan from (Russia) Chernomorets Novorossiysk)
19	MF	KAZ	Rinat Serikkul (from (Kazakhstan) Jetisay)
22	DF	KAZ	Ramazan Karimov (on loan from (Kazakhstan) Kairat)
23	DF	KAZ	Berik Shaikhov (from (Kazakhstan) Turan)
25	DF	KAZ	Timur Rudoselsky (from West Armenia)
27	MF	KAZ	Miras Omatay (from (Kazakhstan) Kairat-Zhastar)
31	GK	KAZ	Mikhail Golubnichiy (from (Kazakhstan) Ekibastuz)
77	MF	KAZ	Dias Orynbasar (from (Kazakhstan) Taraz)
78	GK	RUS	Denis Kavlinov (from (Kazakhstan) Elimai)
87	MF	KAZ	Zhaslan Kairkenov (from (Kazakhstan) Ekibastuz)
93	DF	KAZ	Sultan Askarov (from (Kazakhstan) Kairat)

Out: Note: Flags indicate national team as defined under FIFA eligibility rules; some limited exceptions apply. Players may hold more than one non-FIFA nationality.

No.	Pos.	Nation	Player
1	GK	KAZ	Sanzhar Erniyazov (to (Kazakhstan) Atyrau)
3	DF	KAZ	Nurlan Dairov (to (Kazakhstan) Okzhetpes)
1	DF	GEO	Gia Chaduneli (to (Kazakhstan) Atyrau)
5	DF	KAZ	Rauan Orynbasar (to (Kazakhstan) Irtysh Pavlodar)
6	MF	KAZ	Meyrambek Kalmyrza (to (Kazakhstan) Tobol)
7	MF	KAZ	Serikzhan Muzhikov (to (Kazakhstan) Elimai)
8	MF	KAZ	Dinmukhamed Karaman (from (Kazakhstan) Zhetysu)
10	MF	KAZ	Ravil Atykhanov (to (Kazakhstan) Atyrau)
11	MF	KAZ	Daniyar Usenov (loan return to (Kazakhstan) Kairat)
12	GK	UKR	Orest Kostyk
19	FW	KAZ	Abylaykhan Zhumabek (to (Kazakhstan) Turan)
20	FW	BLR	Anton Shramchenko (to (Belarus) Dynamo Brest)
21	DF	BLR	Konstantin Kuchinsky (to (Belarus) Neman Grodno)
22	DF	KAZ	Adilkhan Dobay (to (Kazakhstan) Irtysh Pavlodar)
23	DF	KAZ	Askhat Baltabekov (to (Kazakhstan) Zhenis)
24	DF	KAZ	Egor Tkachenko (loan return to (Kazakhstan) Kairat)
27	MF	ALB	Shqiprim Taipi (to (Kosovo) Gjilani)
77	GK	RUS	Arsen Siukayev (to (Kazakhstan) Atyrau)
80	DF	BRA	Elivelton (to (Brazil) Sampaio Corrêa)
91	MF	GEO	Temur Chogadze (to (Lithuania) Kauno Žalgiris)
96	DF	BRA	Charleston
