= List of Kazakhstan football transfers winter 2025–26 =

This is a list of Kazakh football transfers during the 2025 winter transfer window.

== Kazakhstan Premier League 2026 ==
=== Aktobe ===
In: Note: Flags indicate national team as defined under FIFA eligibility rules; some limited exceptions apply. Players may hold more than one non-FIFA nationality.

No.	Pos.	Nation	Player
10	FW	SWE	Ajdin Zeljković (from (Sweden) IFK Värnamo)
12	MF	UKR	Dmytro Topalov (from (Ukraine) Shakhtar Donetsk)
14	MF	ARG	Pibe (from (Spain) Cultural Leonesa)
16	GK	KAZ	Aleksandr Zarutsky (from (Kazakhstan) Kairat)
17	MF	POR	Nani
18	DF	UKR	Ivan Ordets
21	MF	ESP	Pablo Álvarez (from (Ukraine) Karpaty Lviv)
23	DF	KAZ	Temirlan Yerlanov (from (Kazakhstan) Tobol)
27	DF	KAZ	Timur Dosmagambetov (from (Kazakhstan) Okzhetpes)

Out: Note: Flags indicate national team as defined under FIFA eligibility rules; some limited exceptions apply. Players may hold more than one non-FIFA nationality.

No.	Pos.	Nation	Player
2	DF	KAZ	Lev Skvortsov (to (Turkey) Serikspor)
4	MF	NGA	Uche Agbo
6	DF	KAZ	Alibek Kasym (to (Kazakhstan) Astana)
10	DF	RUS	Idris Umayev (to (Kazakhstan) Caspiy)
12	FW	GUI	Amadou Doumbouya
14	FW	KAZ	Vyacheslav Shvyryov (to (Kazakhstan) Irtysh Pavlodar)
18	MF	HAI	Jayro Jean (to (Libya) Al Ittihad Al Asskary)
19	FW	KAZ	Oralkhan Omirtayev (to (Kazakhstan) Okzhetpes)
25	GK	ROU	Andrei Vlad
26	DF	SRB	Nemanja Anđelković (to (China) Qingdao Hainiu)
29	MF	KAZ	Daniyar Usenov (loan return to (Kazakhstan) Tobol)
88	DF	ROU	Bogdan Vătăjelu
—	MF	KAZ	Darkhan Berdibek (on loan to (Kazakhstan) Caspiy, previously on loan to (Kazakhstan) Zhenis)
—	FW	KAZ	Aybar Abdulla (released, previously on loan to (Kazakhstan) Turan)

=== Altai ===
In: Note: Flags indicate national team as defined under FIFA eligibility rules; some limited exceptions apply. Players may hold more than one non-FIFA nationality.

No.	Pos.	Nation	Player
3	DF	NGA	Samuel Odeyobo (from (Kazakhstan) Elimai)
4	DF	SRB	Nemanja Mićević (from (Serbia) Radnički Niš)
9	DF	KAZ	Elisey Gorshunov (from (Kazakhstan) Kyzylzhar)
13	GK	RUS	Ivan Konovalov (from (Belarus) Dinamo Minsk)
15	FW	KAZ	Dmitriy Schmidt (from (Kazakhstan) Zhetysu)
18	MF	KAZ	Abylaykhan Nazymkhanov (on loan from (Kazakhstan) Elimai)
42	MF	CRO	Nikola Jambor
70	FW	KAZ	Denis Mitrofanov (from (Kazakhstan) Ulytau)
77	MF	KAZ	Seif Popov (from (Kazakhstan) Kairat)
99	FW	SRB	Dragan Stoisavljević (from (Montenegro) OFK Petrovac)

Out: Note: Flags indicate national team as defined under FIFA eligibility rules; some limited exceptions apply. Players may hold more than one non-FIFA nationality.

No.	Pos.	Nation	Player

=== Astana ===
In: Note: Flags indicate national team as defined under FIFA eligibility rules; some limited exceptions apply. Players may hold more than one non-FIFA nationality.

No.	Pos.	Nation	Player
6	MF	KAZ	Alibek Kasym (from (Kazakhstan) Aktobe)
7	MF	KAZ	Dinmukhamed Karaman (from (Kazakhstan) Zhenis)
20	FW	NGA	Nnamdi Ahanonu (loan return from (Kazakhstan) Kyzylzhar)

Out: Note: Flags indicate national team as defined under FIFA eligibility rules; some limited exceptions apply. Players may hold more than one non-FIFA nationality.

No.	Pos.	Nation	Player
4	DF	KAZ	Marat Bystrov (to (Kazakhstan) Zhenis)
7	MF	BLR	Max Ebong (to (Bulgaria) CSKA Sofia)
9	FW	NGA	Geoffrey Chinedu (to (Russia) Krylia Sovetov)
11	FW	MNE	Driton Camaj (to (Serbia) Novi Pazar)
18	DF	KAZ	Dmitry Shomko (Re-Signed)
22	DF	KAZ	Aleksandr Marochkin (to (Kazakhstan) Tobol)
77	MF	ALB	Nazmi Gripshi (to (Russia) Rubin Kazan)
—	MF	KAZ	Arman Kenesov (on loan to (Kazakhstan) Aktobe, previously on loan to (Kazakhstan) Irtysh Pavlodar)

=== Atyrau ===
In: Note: Flags indicate national team as defined under FIFA eligibility rules; some limited exceptions apply. Players may hold more than one non-FIFA nationality.

No.	Pos.	Nation	Player
—	DF	BLR	Yegor Khvalko (from (Kazakhstan) Tobol)
—	DF	KAZ	Sanzhar Satanov (from (Kazakhstan) Okzhetpes)
—	DF	KAZ	Egor Tkachenko (from (Kazakhstan) Kairat)
—	MF	UKR	Oleksandr Noyok (from (Kazakhstan) Kyzylzhar)
—	FW	KAZ	Yan Trufanov (from (Kazakhstan) Kairat, previously on loan)

Out: Note: Flags indicate national team as defined under FIFA eligibility rules; some limited exceptions apply. Players may hold more than one non-FIFA nationality.

No.	Pos.	Nation	Player
2	DF	UKR	Dmytro Ryzhuk
4	MF	KAZ	Vadim Afanasenko (to (Kazakhstan) Ulytau)
7	FW	BLR	Igor Stasevich
8	MF	GHA	Rashid Abubakar (to (Uzbekistan) Mash'al)
9	FW	RUS	Luka Zgursky (to (Tajikistan) Istiklol)
11	FW	COD	Joel Kayamba
13	MF	KAZ	Nurdaulet Baybosynov (loan return to (Kazakhstan) Taraz)
14	DF	KAZ	Eskendir Kybyray (to (Kazakhstan) Taraz)
17	FW	RUS	Konstantin Dorofeyev (loan return to (Russia) Krasnodar)
19	MF	KAZ	Vadim Yakovlev
20	DF	KAZ	Daniyar Urda
23	MF	BLR	Vasily Sovpel (to (Kazakhstan) Okzhetpes)
31	GK	KAZ	Alisher Suleymen (to (Kazakhstan) Taraz)
33	FW	BLR	Tsvetelin Chunchukov (to (Belarus) Spartak Varna)
37	DF	KAZ	Olzhas Kerimzhanov (to (Kazakhstan) Kyzylzhar)
44	FW	KAZ	Nurdaulet Orynbasar (loan return to (Kazakhstan) Taraz)
77	MF	KAZ	Karym Smykov (to (Kazakhstan) Taraz)
—	DF	TJK	Fakhriddin Akhtamov (to (Tajikistan) Barkchi Hisor, previously on loan to (Tajikistan) Khujand)

=== Caspiy ===
In: Note: Flags indicate national team as defined under FIFA eligibility rules; some limited exceptions apply. Players may hold more than one non-FIFA nationality.

No.	Pos.	Nation	Player
—	GK	KAZ	Dinmukhammed Zhomart (from (Kazakhstan) Zhenis)
—	DF	KAZ	Nuraly Elements (from (Kazakhstan) Irtysh Pavlodar)
—	DF	KAZ	Amandyk Nabikhanov (from (Kazakhstan) Zhenis)
—	DF	POR	André Amaral (from (Portugal) Os Belenenses)
—	DF	TUR	Berat Değirmenci (from (Turkey) Beykoz Ishakli)
—	MF	KAZ	Darkhan Berdibek (on loan from (Kazakhstan) Aktobe)
—	MF	KAZ	David Esimbekov (from (Russia) Chernomorets Novorossiysk)

Out: Note: Flags indicate national team as defined under FIFA eligibility rules; some limited exceptions apply. Players may hold more than one non-FIFA nationality.

No.	Pos.	Nation	Player

=== Elimai ===
In: Note: Flags indicate national team as defined under FIFA eligibility rules; some limited exceptions apply. Players may hold more than one non-FIFA nationality.

No.	Pos.	Nation	Player
18	MF	KAZ	Ramazan Orazov (from (Denmark) Silkeborg, previously on loan)
—	GK	POR	Vladimir Stojković
—	DF	ALB	Edison Ndreca (from (Albania) Egnatia)
—	DF	BRA	Higor Gabriel (from (Uzbekistan) Navbahor Namangan)
—	DF	SRB	Ivan Miladinović (from (Kazakhstan) Tobol)
—	MF	CRO	Hrvoje Ilić
—	MF	KAZ	Arsen Ashirbek (from (Kazakhstan) Okzhetpes)
—	MF	KAZ	Abylaykhan Nazymkhanov (loan return from (Kazakhstan) Turan)
—	FW	KAZ	Aybar Zhaksylykov (from (Kazakhstan) Kaisar)

Out: Note: Flags indicate national team as defined under FIFA eligibility rules; some limited exceptions apply. Players may hold more than one non-FIFA nationality.

No.	Pos.	Nation	Player
3	DF	NGA	Samuel Odeyobo (to (Kazakhstan) Altai)
15	DF	SRB	Nemanja Ćalasan (to (Uzbekistan) Andijon)
19	FW	KAZ	Galymzhan Kenzhebek (to (Russia) Akhmat Grozny)
21	DF	URU	Kevin Rolón
23	MF	BRA	Maicom David (to (Israel) Bnei Sakhnin)
25	DF	KAZ	Egor Tkachenko (loan return to (Kazakhstan) Kairat)
35	GK	UKR	Maksym Koval (To (Ukraine) Chornomorets Odesa)

=== Kairat ===
In: Note: Flags indicate national team as defined under FIFA eligibility rules; some limited exceptions apply. Players may hold more than one non-FIFA nationality.

No.	Pos.	Nation	Player
11	MF	ARG	Sebastián Zeballos (from (Bolivia) Real Oruro)
13	MF	FIN	Jaakko Oksanen (from (Finland) KuPS)
19	MF	FIN	Oiva Jukkola (from (Finland) Ilves)
44	MF	BRA	Lucas Áfrico (from (Turkey) Vanspor)

Out: Note: Flags indicate national team as defined under FIFA eligibility rules; some limited exceptions apply. Players may hold more than one non-FIFA nationality.

No.	Pos.	Nation	Player
1	GK	KAZ	Aleksandr Zarutsky (to (Kazakhstan) Aktobe)
10	MF	GEO	Giorgi Zaria
11	FW	BRA	João Paulo
15	DF	ISR	Ofri Arad (to (Romania) FCSB)
19	FW	BRA	Élder Santana
33	MF	SRB	Jug Stanojev (to (Romania) Universitatea Cluj)
55	MF	BLR	Valery Gromyko (to (Belarus) Maxline Vitebsk)
80	DF	RUS	Yegor Sorokin (to (China) Chengdu Rongcheng)
—	DF	KAZ	Sultan Askarov (on loan to (Kazakhstan) Kaisar, previously on loan to (Kazakhstan) Zhetysu)
—	DF	KAZ	Ramazan Karimov (on loan to (Kazakhstan) Irtysh Pavlodar, previously on loan to (Kazakhstan) Zhetysu)
—	DF	KAZ	Egor Tkachenko (to (Kazakhstan) Atyrau, previously on loan to (Kazakhstan) Yelimay)
—	MF	KAZ	Miras Omatay (to (Kazakhstan) Irtysh Pavlodar, previously on loan to (Kazakhstan) Zhetysu)
—	FW	KAZ	Yan Trufanov (to (Kazakhstan) Atyrau, previously on loan)
—	FW	KAZ	Gleb Valgushev (to (Kazakhstan) Kyzylzhar)

=== Kaisar ===
In: Note: Flags indicate national team as defined under FIFA eligibility rules; some limited exceptions apply. Players may hold more than one non-FIFA nationality.

No.	Pos.	Nation	Player
11	MF	NGA	Victor Moses (Unattached)
47	MF	KAZ	Bacdaulet Konlimkos (from (Kazakhstan) Caspiy)
—	GK	SVK	Adam Kovac (from (Tajikistan) Vakhsh Bokhtar)
—	DF	KAZ	Niyaz Idrisov (from (Kazakhstan) Okzhetpes)
—	MF	SRB	Nikola Cuckić (from (Kazakhstan) Okzhetpes)
—	DF	KAZ	Sagi Sovet (from (Kazakhstan) Zhenis)
—	MF	CHI	Thomas Jones (from (Chile) Deportes Copiapó)
—	MF	KAZ	Salamat Zhumabekov (from (Kazakhstan) Okzhetpes)
—	MF	KAZ	Muslim Zhumat (from (Kazakhstan) Taraz)
—	MF	RUS	Amir Mokhammad (from (Russia) Baltika Kaliningrad)
—	FW	KAZ	Aliyar Mukhammed (from (Kazakhstan) Okzhetpes)
—	FW	KAZ	Batyrkhan Tazhibay (from (Kazakhstan) Okzhetpes)

Out: Note: Flags indicate national team as defined under FIFA eligibility rules; some limited exceptions apply. Players may hold more than one non-FIFA nationality.

No.	Pos.	Nation	Player
7	FW	KAZ	Elzhas Altynbekov
9	FW	KAZ	Ersultan Torekul (to (Kazakhstan) Taraz)
17	DF	KAZ	Kuanysh Kalmuratov
19	FW	KAZ	Aybar Zhaksylykov (to (Kazakhstan) Elimai)
20	MF	KAZ	Bekzat Kurmanbekuly
23	DF	KAZ	Ilyas Amirseitov
27	DF	KAZ	Nikita Gubarev (to (Kazakhstan) Kyzylzhar)
35	GK	KAZ	Aleksandr Mokin (Retired)
44	DF	KAZ	Karam Sultanov
73	MF	KAZ	Didar Zhalmukan
77	FW	KAZ	Marlen Aymanov
88	MF	KAZ	Alibi Tuzakbaev

=== Kyzylzhar ===
In: Note: Flags indicate national team as defined under FIFA eligibility rules; some limited exceptions apply. Players may hold more than one non-FIFA nationality.

No.	Pos.	Nation	Player
5	DF	KAZ	Demiyat Slambekov (from (Kazakhstan) Ulytau)
8	MF	BIH	Damjan Krajišnik (from (Bosnia and Herzegovina) Radnik Bijeljina)
9	MF	FRO	Jóannes Bjartalíð (from (Norway) Fredrikstad)
19	MF	UKR	Yevhen Makarenko
22	MF	KAZ	Yury Pertsukh (from (Kazakhstan) Turan)
25	DF	BUL	Plamen Galabov (from (Scotland) Dundee)
26	DF	KAZ	Olzhas Kerimzhanov (from (Kazakhstan) Atyrau)
28	MF	SRB	Nedeljko Piščević (from (Montenegro) Budućnost Podgorica)
34	GK	MDA	Dumitru Celeadnic (from (Kazakhstan) Ordabasy)
79	MF	KAZ	Roman Chirkov (from (Kazakhstan) Turan)
—	GK	KAZ	Sanzhar Erniyazov (from (Kazakhstan) Khan Tengri)
—	DF	KAZ	Nikita Gubarev (from (Kazakhstan) Kaisar)
—	DF	KAZ	Timur Kurbanov (from (Kazakhstan) Caspiy)
—	DF	KAZ	Alikhan Serikbay (from (Kazakhstan) Caspiy)
—	DF	KAZ	Aleksandr Sokolenko (from (Russia) Media League)
—	MF	SEN	Honore Gomis (from (Georgia (country)) Dinamo Tbilisi)
—	FW	CIV	Etienne Beugre (from (France) Girondins de Bordeaux)
—	FW	KAZ	Aslan Adil (from (Kazakhstan) Zhenis)
—	FW	KAZ	Gleb Valgushev (from (Kazakhstan) Kairat)

Out: Note: Flags indicate national team as defined under FIFA eligibility rules; some limited exceptions apply. Players may hold more than one non-FIFA nationality.

No.	Pos.	Nation	Player
1	GK	KAZ	Dzhurakhon Babakhanov
5	MF	BRA	Rafael Sabino
8	MF	KAZ	Andrey Ulshin (to (Kazakhstan) Zhenis)
9	MF	KAZ	Ruslan Valiullin
10	FW	KAZ	Toktar Zhangylyshbay (to (Kazakhstan) Okzhetpes)
12	MF	KAZ	Madi Zhakipbayev (to (Kazakhstan) Zhetysu)
14	MF	KAZ	Samat Zharynbetov
15	FW	CIV	Senin Sebai (to (Hong Kong) Lee Man)
20	MF	CIV	Michelle Kao
25	DF	CIV	Abdoul Aziz Touré (to (Belarus) Dinamo Minsk)
41	GK	RUS	Miroslav Lobantsev
44	DF	RUS	Andrei Vasilyev (to (Belarus) Neman Grodno)
55	MF	UKR	Oleksandr Noyok (to (Kazakhstan) Atyrau)
77	DF	KAZ	Dmitry Miroshnichenko
84	MF	CIV	Néné Gbamblé (to (Qatar) Al Kharaitiyat)
99	DF	KAZ	Elisey Gorshunov (to (Kazakhstan) Altai)

=== Okzhetpes ===
In: Note: Flags indicate national team as defined under FIFA eligibility rules; some limited exceptions apply. Players may hold more than one non-FIFA nationality.

No.	Pos.	Nation	Player
—	GK	KAZ	Mikhail Golubnichiy (from (Kazakhstan) Zhetysu)
—	DF	KAZ	Sayan Mukanov (from (Kazakhstan) Zhenis)
—	DF	UKR	Borys Lototskyi (from (Ukraine) Nyva Vinnytsia)
—	MF	BLR	Dzmitry Baradzin (from (Belarus) Torpedo-BelAZ Zhodino)
—	MF	BLR	Vasily Sovpel (from (Kazakhstan) Atyrau)
—	MF	KAZ	Nurgaini Buribaev (from (Kazakhstan) Irtysh Pavlodar)
—	MF	KAZ	Mokhammed Ensebaev (from (Kazakhstan) Irtysh Pavlodar)
—	MF	KAZ	Zhansultan Mukhametkhanov (from (Kazakhstan) Zhetysu)
—	MF	KAZ	Abinur Nurymbet (from (Kazakhstan) Irtysh Pavlodar)
—	FW	KAZ	Oralkhan Omirtayev (from (Kazakhstan) Aktobe)
—	FW	KAZ	Vladimir Vomenko (from (Kazakhstan) Irtysh Pavlodar)
—	FW	KAZ	Toktar Zhangylyshbay (from (Kazakhstan) Kyzylzhar)

Out: Note: Flags indicate national team as defined under FIFA eligibility rules; some limited exceptions apply. Players may hold more than one non-FIFA nationality.

No.	Pos.	Nation	Player
1	DF	KAZ	Kazhymukan Tolepbergen
2	MF	KAZ	Arsen Ashirbek (to (Kazakhstan) Elimai)
3	DF	KAZ	Nurlan Dairov (to (Kazakhstan) Taraz)
5	DF	KAZ	Sanzhar Satanov (to (Kazakhstan) Atyrau)
6	DF	KAZ	Beksultan Shamshi
7	FW	KAZ	Damir Marat (to (Kazakhstan) Tobol)
8	MF	KAZ	Serikzhan Muzhikov (to (Kazakhstan) Zhetysu)
9	FW	KAZ	Shyngys Flyuk
10	FW	KAZ	Dauren Zhumat (to (Kazakhstan) Tobol)
11	FW	KAZ	Batyrkhan Tazhibay (to (Kazakhstan) Kaisar)
14	FW	KAZ	Adam Adakhadzhiev (to (Kazakhstan) Zhetysu)
15	DF	KAZ	Niyaz Idrisov (to (Kazakhstan) Kaisar)
17	MF	KAZ	Salamat Zhumabekov (to (Kazakhstan) Kaisar)
19	FW	KAZ	Vladislav Prokopenko
21	DF	KAZ	Sultan Abilgazy
22	GK	KAZ	Danil Podymskiy (to (Kazakhstan) Zhetysu)
24	MF	SRB	Nikola Cuckić (to (Kazakhstan) Kaisar)
27	MF	KAZ	Timur Dosmagambetov (to (Kazakhstan) Aktobe)
28	DF	KAZ	Viktor Gunchenko
42	DF	BRA	Enzo (to (Brazil) Pouso Alegre)
66	MF	KAZ	Meyrambek Kalmyrza (loan return to (Kazakhstan) Tobol)
77	MF	SRB	Strahinja Jovanović
96	FW	KAZ	Aliyar Mukhammed (to (Kazakhstan) Kaisar)

=== Ordabasy ===
In: Note: Flags indicate national team as defined under FIFA eligibility rules; some limited exceptions apply. Players may hold more than one non-FIFA nationality.

No.	Pos.	Nation	Player
—	FW	BUL	Dimitar Mitkov (from (Bulgaria) Botev Plovdiv)

Out: Note: Flags indicate national team as defined under FIFA eligibility rules; some limited exceptions apply. Players may hold more than one non-FIFA nationality.

No.	Pos.	Nation	Player
5	DF	SRB	Nikola Antić
7	MF	GEO	Luka Imnadze (to (Kazakhstan) Zhenis)
27	MF	CRO	Dario Čanađija (to (Croatia) Mladost Ždralovi)
34	GK	MDA	Dumitru Celeadnic (to (Kazakhstan) Kyzylzhar)
98	MF	CPV	João Paulino (loan return to (Romania) Politehnica Iași)

=== Tobol ===
In: Note: Flags indicate national team as defined under FIFA eligibility rules; some limited exceptions apply. Players may hold more than one non-FIFA nationality.

No.	Pos.	Nation	Player
22	DF	KAZ	Aleksandr Marochkin (from (Kazakhstan) Astana)
—	DF	GUI	Abdoulaye Cissé (from (Serbia) Novi Pazar)
—	MF	BLR	Maksim Myakish (from (Belarus) Dinamo Minsk)
—	MF	KAZ	Meyrambek Kalmyrza (loan return from (Kazakhstan) Okzhetpes)
—	MF	KAZ	Daniyar Usenov (loan return from (Kazakhstan) Aktobe)
—	MF	KAZ	Dauren Zhumat (from (Kazakhstan) Okzhetpes)
—	MF	MAR	Amine Talal (from (Russia) Akhmat Grozny)
—	MF	VEN	Luis Guerra (from (Chile) Deportes Limache)
—	FW	ALB	Rubin Hebaj (from (Uzbekistan) Sogdiana)
—	FW	KAZ	Damir Marat (from (Kazakhstan) Okzhetpes)

Out: Note: Flags indicate national team as defined under FIFA eligibility rules; some limited exceptions apply. Players may hold more than one non-FIFA nationality.

No.	Pos.	Nation	Player
6	MF	NGA	Ededem Essien (to (Iraq) Erbil)
10	MF	MAR	Ahmed El Messaoudi (to (China) Qingdao Hainiu)
11	DF	KAZ	Islam Chesnokov (to (Scotland) Heart of Midlothian)
14	FW	BLR	Nikolay Signevich
23	DF	KAZ	Temirlan Yerlanov (to (Kazakhstan) Aktobe)
55	DF	SRB	Ivan Miladinović (to (Kazakhstan) Yelimay)
70	MF	UZB	Shokhboz Umarov (to (Uzbekistan) Bunyodkor)
78	DF	BLR	Yegor Khvalko (to (Kazakhstan) Atyrau)

=== Ulytau ===
In: Note: Flags indicate national team as defined under FIFA eligibility rules; some limited exceptions apply. Players may hold more than one non-FIFA nationality.

No.	Pos.	Nation	Player
—	GK	KAZ	Timurbek Zakirov (from (Kazakhstan) Turan)
—	DF	KAZ	Sagi Malikaydar (from (Kazakhstan) Turan)
—	DF	UKR	Hlib Bukhal (from (Armenia) Van)
—	MF	CMR	Arthur Bougnone (from (Belarus) Slutsk)
—	MF	GHA	David Anane Martin (from (Lithuania) Džiugas Telšiai)
—	MF	JPN	Hiroki Harada (from (Montenegro) Jezero)
—	MF	KAZ	Ramazan Abylaykhan (loan return from (Kazakhstan) Jetisay)
—	MF	KAZ	Vadim Afanasenko (from (Kazakhstan) Atyrau)
—	MF	KAZ	Ernar Kospayev (from (Kazakhstan) Jetisay)
—	MF	KAZ	Rinat Serikkul (from (Kazakhstan) Zhetysu)
—	FW	KAZ	Abzal Mukanbetzhanov (from (Kazakhstan) Taraz)

Out: Note: Flags indicate national team as defined under FIFA eligibility rules; some limited exceptions apply. Players may hold more than one non-FIFA nationality.

No.	Pos.	Nation	Player
5	DF	KAZ	Demiyat Slambekov (to (Kazakhstan) Kyzylzhar)
6	DF	UKR	Yaroslav Terekhov
9	FW	KAZ	Denis Mitrofanov
11	FW	UKR	Dmytro Yusov
14	MF	KAZ	Akhmet Tuleev
17	FW	KAZ	Zhasulan Moldakarayev (from (Kazakhstan) Taraz)
18	DF	ESP	José Carrillo (to (Spain) Real Jaén)
22	DF	KAZ	Bekzhan Rzatayev
23	DF	MNE	Jovan Pajovic
30	MF	GEO	Piruz Marakvelidze
35	GK	KAZ	Stanislav Pavlov

=== Zhenis ===
In: Note: Flags indicate national team as defined under FIFA eligibility rules; some limited exceptions apply. Players may hold more than one non-FIFA nationality.

No.	Pos.	Nation	Player
—	GK	BLR	Maksim Plotnikov (from (Belarus) Slavia Mozyr)
—	DF	KAZ	Marat Bystrov (from (Kazakhstan) Astana)
—	DF	KAZ	Mikael Askarov (from (Kazakhstan) Turan)
—	MF	GEO	Luka Imnadze (from (Kazakhstan) Ordabasy)
—	MF	KAZ	Alexander Merkel (from (United Arab Emirates) Legentus)
—	MF	KAZ	Andrey Ulshin (from (Kazakhstan) Kyzylzhar)
—	FW	NGA	Samson Iyede (from (Serbia) Novi Pazar)

Out: Note: Flags indicate national team as defined under FIFA eligibility rules; some limited exceptions apply. Players may hold more than one non-FIFA nationality.

No.	Pos.	Nation	Player
1	GK	BLR	Sergey Ignatovich (from (Belarus) Torpedo-BelAZ Zhodino)
2	DF	KAZ	Amandyk Nabikhanov (to (Kazakhstan) Caspiy)
4	DF	KAZ	Sagi Sovet (to (Kazakhstan) Kaisar)
5	DF	KAZ	Sayan Mukanov (to (Kazakhstan) Okzhetpes)
8	MF	KAZ	Dinmukhamed Karaman
11	GK	KAZ	Aslan Adil (to (Kazakhstan) Kyzylzhar)
20	MF	POR	Rui Batalha (to (Lithuania) Šiauliai)
23	DF	KAZ	Askhat Baltabekov (to (Kazakhstan) Zhetysu)
24	GK	KAZ	Dinmukhammed Zhomart (to (Kazakhstan) Caspiy)
25	DF	SVN	Matija Rom (to (Uzbekistan) Khorazm)
39	FW	BLR	Vsevolod Sadovsky
71	MF	KAZ	Darkhan Berdibek (loan return to (Kazakhstan) Aktobe)
—	FW	KAZ	Nurbol Anuarbekov (to (Kazakhstan) Zhetysu, previously on loan)

=== Zhetysu ===
In: Note: Flags indicate national team as defined under FIFA eligibility rules; some limited exceptions apply. Players may hold more than one non-FIFA nationality.

No.	Pos.	Nation	Player
—	GK	KAZ	Danil Podymskiy (from (Kazakhstan) Okzhetpes)
—	GK	MDA	Ștefan Sicaci (from (Georgia (country)) Dinamo Tbilisi)
—	DF	KAZ	Rafkat Aslan (from (Kazakhstan) Caspiy)
—	DF	KAZ	Askhat Baltabekov (from (Kazakhstan) Zhenis)
—	DF	KAZ	Adilkhan Dobay (from (Kazakhstan) Irtysh Pavlodar)
—	DF	KAZ	Rauan Orynbasar (from (Kazakhstan) Turan)
—	MF	KAZ	Serikzhan Muzhikov (from (Kazakhstan) Okzhetpes)
—	MF	KAZ	Miras Umaniyazov (from (Kazakhstan) Aktobe)
—	MF	KAZ	Madi Zhakipbayev (from (Kazakhstan) Kyzylzhar)
—	FW	KAZ	Adam Adakhadzhiev (to (Kazakhstan) Okzhetpes)
—	FW	KAZ	Shokhan Abzalov (from (Kazakhstan) Turan)
—	FW	KAZ	Nurbol Anuarbekov (from (Kazakhstan) Zhenis, previously on loan)

Out: Note: Flags indicate national team as defined under FIFA eligibility rules; some limited exceptions apply. Players may hold more than one non-FIFA nationality.

No.	Pos.	Nation	Player
5	DF	BLR	Maksim Kovel (to (Belarus) Dynamo Brest)
9	MF	SLE	Saidu Fofanah (to (Israel) Hapoel Ra'anana)
14	MF	KAZ	Zhansultan Mukhametkhanov (to (Kazakhstan) Okzhetpes)
17	MF	KAZ	David Esimbekov (loan return to (Russia) Chernomorets Novorossiysk)
19	MF	KAZ	Rinat Serikkul (from (Kazakhstan) Ulytau)
22	DF	KAZ	Ramazan Karimov (loan return to (Kazakhstan) Kairat)
27	MF	KAZ	Miras Omatay (loan return to (Kazakhstan) Kairat)
31	GK	KAZ	Mikhail Golubnichiy (to (Kazakhstan) Okzhetpes)
78	GK	RUS	Denis Kavlinov (to (Tajikistan) Istiklol)
93	DF	KAZ	Sultan Askarov (loan return to (Kazakhstan) Kairat)
