= List of Kazakhstan football transfers summer 2025 =

This is a list of Kazakh football transfers during the 2025 summer transfer window.

== Kazakhstan Premier League 2025 ==
=== Aktobe ===
In: Note: Flags indicate national team as defined under FIFA eligibility rules; some limited exceptions apply. Players may hold more than one non-FIFA nationality.

No.	Pos.	Nation	Player
2	DF	(Kazakhstan) KAZ	Lev Skvortsov (from (Russia) Khimki, previously on loan)
7	FW	(Niger) NIG	Daniel Sosah (from (Ukraine) Kryvbas Kryvyi Rih)
11	FW	(Kazakhstan) KAZ	Artur Shushenachev (from (Israel) Hapoel Be'er Sheva)
14	FW	(Kazakhstan) KAZ	Vyacheslav Shvyryov (from (Kazakhstan) Ordabasy)
20	MF	(Kazakhstan) KAZ	Georgy Zhukov (from (Poland) Puszcza Niepołomice)
23	DF	(Kazakhstan) KAZ	Talgat Kusyapov (from (Russia) KAMAZ)
30	MF	(Belarus) BLR	Nikita Korzun (from (Kazakhstan) Elimai)

Out: Note: Flags indicate national team as defined under FIFA eligibility rules; some limited exceptions apply. Players may hold more than one non-FIFA nationality.

No.	Pos.	Nation	Player
3	DF	(Kazakhstan) KAZ	Sayat Zhumagali (to (Kazakhstan) Khan Tengri)
9	FW	(Serbia) SRB	Đorđe Ivković (to (North Macedonia) Struga)
15	DF	(Cameroon) CMR	Gaby Kiki
67	GK	(Kazakhstan) KAZ	Darkhan Berdibek (on loan to (Kazakhstan) Zhenis)
80	FW	(Kazakhstan) KAZ	Aybar Abdulla (on loan to (Kazakhstan) Turan)

=== Astana ===
In: Note: Flags indicate national team as defined under FIFA eligibility rules; some limited exceptions apply. Players may hold more than one non-FIFA nationality.

No.	Pos.	Nation	Player
8	MF	(Bosnia and Herzegovina) BIH	Ivan Bašić (from (Russia) Orenburg)
11	FW	(Montenegro) MNE	Driton Camaj (from (Hungary) Kecskeméti)
—	MF	(Kazakhstan) KAZ	Bauyrzhan Islamkhan (from (Kazakhstan) Turan)

Out: Note: Flags indicate national team as defined under FIFA eligibility rules; some limited exceptions apply. Players may hold more than one non-FIFA nationality.

No.	Pos.	Nation	Player
8	MF	(Kazakhstan) KAZ	Arman Kenesov (on loan to (Kazakhstan) Irtysh Pavlodar)
11	MF	(Nigeria) NGA	Nnamdi Ahanonu (on loan to (Kazakhstan) Kyzylzhar)
21	MF	(Kazakhstan) KAZ	Elkhan Astanov (on loan to (Kazakhstan) Ordabasy)

=== Atyrau ===
In: Note: Flags indicate national team as defined under FIFA eligibility rules; some limited exceptions apply. Players may hold more than one non-FIFA nationality.

No.	Pos.	Nation	Player

Out: Note: Flags indicate national team as defined under FIFA eligibility rules; some limited exceptions apply. Players may hold more than one non-FIFA nationality.

No.	Pos.	Nation	Player
20	MF	(Kazakhstan) KAZ	Ersultan Kaldybekov (to (Kazakhstan) Kaisar)
23	MF	(Kazakhstan) KAZ	Amandyk Nabikhanov (to (Kazakhstan) Zhenis)

=== Elimai ===
In: Note: Flags indicate national team as defined under FIFA eligibility rules; some limited exceptions apply. Players may hold more than one non-FIFA nationality.

No.	Pos.	Nation	Player

Out: Note: Flags indicate national team as defined under FIFA eligibility rules; some limited exceptions apply. Players may hold more than one non-FIFA nationality.

No.	Pos.	Nation	Player

=== Kairat ===
In: Note: Flags indicate national team as defined under FIFA eligibility rules; some limited exceptions apply. Players may hold more than one non-FIFA nationality.

No.	Pos.	Nation	Player
26	FW	(Brazil) BRA	Edmilson (from (Slovenia) Celje)
99	FW	(Brazil) BRA	Ricardinho (on loan from (Czech Republic) Viktoria Plzeň)

Out: Note: Flags indicate national team as defined under FIFA eligibility rules; some limited exceptions apply. Players may hold more than one non-FIFA nationality.

No.	Pos.	Nation	Player

=== Kaisar ===
In: Note: Flags indicate national team as defined under FIFA eligibility rules; some limited exceptions apply. Players may hold more than one non-FIFA nationality.

No.	Pos.	Nation	Player
—	DF	(Kazakhstan) KAZ	Ilyas Amirseitov (from (Kazakhstan) Khan Tengri)
—	MF	(Kazakhstan) KAZ	Ersultan Kaldybekov (from (Kazakhstan) Atyrau)
—	FW	(Kazakhstan) KAZ	Dimash Serikuly (from (Kazakhstan) Taraz)

Out: Note: Flags indicate national team as defined under FIFA eligibility rules; some limited exceptions apply. Players may hold more than one non-FIFA nationality.

No.	Pos.	Nation	Player
6	FW	(Kazakhstan) KAZ	Magzhan Baurzhan (on loan to (Kazakhstan) Zhetysu)
11	FW	(Kazakhstan) KAZ	Nurdaulet Amirbek (on loan to (Kazakhstan) Zhetysu)

=== Kyzylzhar ===
In: Note: Flags indicate national team as defined under FIFA eligibility rules; some limited exceptions apply. Players may hold more than one non-FIFA nationality.

No.	Pos.	Nation	Player
—	MF	(Nigeria) NGA	Nnamdi Ahanonu (from (Kazakhstan) Kyzylzhar)

Out: Note: Flags indicate national team as defined under FIFA eligibility rules; some limited exceptions apply. Players may hold more than one non-FIFA nationality.

No.	Pos.	Nation	Player

=== Okzhetpes ===
In: Note: Flags indicate national team as defined under FIFA eligibility rules; some limited exceptions apply. Players may hold more than one non-FIFA nationality.

No.	Pos.	Nation	Player
—	MF	(Kazakhstan) KAZ	Meyrambek Kalmyrza (on loan from (Kazakhstan) Tobol)

Out: Note: Flags indicate national team as defined under FIFA eligibility rules; some limited exceptions apply. Players may hold more than one non-FIFA nationality.

No.	Pos.	Nation	Player

=== Ordabasy ===
In: Note: Flags indicate national team as defined under FIFA eligibility rules; some limited exceptions apply. Players may hold more than one non-FIFA nationality.

No.	Pos.	Nation	Player
8	MF	(Ukraine) UKR	Yuriy Vakulko (from (Ukraine) Kryvbas Kryvyi Rih)
10	FW	(Kazakhstan) KAZ	Abylaykhan Zhumabek (from (Kazakhstan) Turan)
16	MF	(Romania) ROU	Mihai Căpățînă (from (Romania) Universitatea Craiova)
30	MF	(Ukraine) UKR	Vladyslav Naumets (from (Ukraine) LNZ Cherkasy)
—	MF	(Kazakhstan) KAZ	Elkhan Astanov (on loan from (Kazakhstan) Astana)

Out: Note: Flags indicate national team as defined under FIFA eligibility rules; some limited exceptions apply. Players may hold more than one non-FIFA nationality.

No.	Pos.	Nation	Player

=== Tobol ===
In: Note: Flags indicate national team as defined under FIFA eligibility rules; some limited exceptions apply. Players may hold more than one non-FIFA nationality.

No.	Pos.	Nation	Player
—	DF	(Montenegro) MNE	Nemanja Cavnić (from (Bosnia and Herzegovina) Željezničar)

Out: Note: Flags indicate national team as defined under FIFA eligibility rules; some limited exceptions apply. Players may hold more than one non-FIFA nationality.

No.	Pos.	Nation	Player
22	MF	(Kazakhstan) KAZ	Meyrambek Kalmyrza (on loan to (Kazakhstan) Okzhetpes)

=== Turan ===
In: Note: Flags indicate national team as defined under FIFA eligibility rules; some limited exceptions apply. Players may hold more than one non-FIFA nationality.

No.	Pos.	Nation	Player

Out: Note: Flags indicate national team as defined under FIFA eligibility rules; some limited exceptions apply. Players may hold more than one non-FIFA nationality.

No.	Pos.	Nation	Player
9	FW	(Kazakhstan) KAZ	Abylaykhan Zhumabek (to (Kazakhstan) Ordabasy)
—	MF	(Kazakhstan) KAZ	Bauyrzhan Islamkhan (to (Kazakhstan) Astana)

=== Ulytau ===
In: Note: Flags indicate national team as defined under FIFA eligibility rules; some limited exceptions apply. Players may hold more than one non-FIFA nationality.

No.	Pos.	Nation	Player

Out: Note: Flags indicate national team as defined under FIFA eligibility rules; some limited exceptions apply. Players may hold more than one non-FIFA nationality.

No.	Pos.	Nation	Player

=== Zhenis ===
In: Note: Flags indicate national team as defined under FIFA eligibility rules; some limited exceptions apply. Players may hold more than one non-FIFA nationality.

No.	Pos.	Nation	Player
2	DF	(Kazakhstan) KAZ	Amandyk Nabikhanov (from (Kazakhstan) Atyrau)
9	FW	(Georgia (country)) GEO	Elguja Lobjanidze (from (Uzbekistan) Qizilqum)
20	FW	(Portugal) POR	Rui Batalha (from (Portugal) 1º Dezembro)
39	FW	(Belarus) BLR	Vsevolod Sadovsky (from (Poland) Kotwica Kołobrzeg)
40	GK	(Ghana) GHA	Razak Abalora (from (Albania) Elbasani)
71	GK	(Kazakhstan) KAZ	Darkhan Berdibek (on loan from (Kazakhstan) Aktobe)

Out: Note: Flags indicate national team as defined under FIFA eligibility rules; some limited exceptions apply. Players may hold more than one non-FIFA nationality.

No.	Pos.	Nation	Player
15	DF	(Poland) POL	Krystian Nowak (to (Uzbekistan) Andijon)
77	FW	(Kazakhstan) KAZ	Nurbol Anuarbekov (on loan to (Kazakhstan) Zhetysu)
90	GK	(Kazakhstan) KAZ	Vladislav Saenko

=== Zhetysu ===
In: Note: Flags indicate national team as defined under FIFA eligibility rules; some limited exceptions apply. Players may hold more than one non-FIFA nationality.

No.	Pos.	Nation	Player
—	FW	(Kazakhstan) KAZ	Nurdaulet Amirbek (on loan from (Kazakhstan) Kaisar)
—	FW	(Kazakhstan) KAZ	Magzhan Baurzhan (on loan from (Kazakhstan) Kaisar)
—	FW	(Kazakhstan) KAZ	Nurbol Anuarbekov (on loan from (Kazakhstan) Zhenis)

Out: Note: Flags indicate national team as defined under FIFA eligibility rules; some limited exceptions apply. Players may hold more than one non-FIFA nationality.

No.	Pos.	Nation	Player
