= Levchuk =

Levchuk or Lewchuk is a surname of Ukrainian origin. Notable people with the surname include:

- Vyacheslav Levchuk (born 1971), Belarusian football coach and former player
- Margarita Levchuk (born 1990), Belarusian opera singer
