= Guilherme Morais =

Portuguese footballer (born 1996)

Personal information
- Full name: Guilherme Pereira Sebastião de Morais
- Date of birth: 2 March 1996 (age 30)
- Place of birth: Portimão, Portugal
- Height: 1.82 m (6 ft 0 in)
- Position: Midfielder

Team information
- Current team: Atyrau

Youth career
- 2011–2012: Benfica
- 2012–2013: Vitória de Guimarães
- 2013–2014: Genoa
- 2014–2015: Vitória de Setúbal

Senior career*
Years	Team	Apps	(Gls)
2015–2016	→ Louletano (loan)	21	(0)
2016–2018	Louletano	56	(2)
2018–2019	Lusitania	30	(2)
2019–2020	Olhanense	13	(0)
2020–2021	Leça	25	(0)
2021–2023	Torreense	44	(1)
2023	Real Murcia	0	(0)
2024	Haka	27	(1)
2025–	Atyrau	7	(0)
- * Club domestic league appearances and goals as of 4 June 2025

Guilherme Pereira Sebastião de Morais (born 2 March 1996) is a Portuguese professional football player who plays as a midfielder for Kazakhstan Premier League side Atyrau.

== Career ==
On 14 December 2023, Morais moved to Finland after signing with FC Haka in Finnish top-tier Veikkausliiga.

In February 2025, he signed with Atyrau in Kazakhstan Premier League.

== Career statistics ==
As of 4 June 2025

Appearances and goals by club, season and competition
Club	Season	League			National cup (Note: Includes Taça de Portugal, Suomen Cup and Kazakhstan Cup)		League cup (Note: Includes Taça da Liga and Finnish League Cup)		Total	
Club	Season	Division	Apps	Goals	Apps	Goals	Apps	Goals	Apps	Goals
Louletano (loan)	2015–16	Campeonato de Portugal	21	0	–		–		21	0
Louletano	2016–17	Campeonato de Portugal	29	0	–		–		29	0
Louletano	2017–18	Campeonato de Portugal	27	2	–		–		27	2
Louletano	Total		56	2	0	0	0	0	56	2
Lusitania	2018–19	Campeonato de Portugal	30	2	–		–		30	2
Olhanense	2019–20	Campeonato de Portugal	13	0	1	0	–		14	0
Leça	2020–21	Campeonato de Portugal	25	0	1	0	–		26	0
Torreense	2021–22	Liga 3	27	0	3	0	–		30	0
Torreense	2022–23	Liga Portugal 2	17	0	0	0	2	0	19	0
Torreense	Total		44	0	3	0	2	0	49	0
Real Murcia	2023–24	Primera Federación	0	0	0	0	–		0	0
Haka	2024	Veikkausliiga	27	1	2	0	4	0	33	1
Atyrau	2025	Kazakhstan Premier League	7	0	1	0	0	0	8	0
Career total			223	5	8	0	6	0	237	5

== Honours ==
Torreense

- Liga 3 promotion series: 2021–2022
