= Yegor Khatkevich =

Belarusian footballer

Personal information
- Full name: Yegor Tadeushevich Khatkevich
- Date of birth: 9 July 1988 (age 38)
- Place of birth: Minsk, Belarusian SSR, Soviet Union
- Height: 1.95 m (6 ft 5 in)
- Position: Goalkeeper

Team information
- Current team: Atyrau
- Number: 1

Youth career
- 2005–2007: BATE Borisov

Senior career*
Years	Team	Apps	(Gls)
2006–2007	BATE Borisov	0	(0)
2006	→ Lida (loan)	7	(0)
2007–2008	MTZ-RIPO Minsk	1	(0)
2008	→ Junsele IF (loan)	12	(0)
2009	Vitebsk	0	(0)
2010–2012	Vedrich-97 Rechitsa	83	(0)
2013	Gomel	21	(0)
2014–2015	Naftan Novopolotsk	32	(0)
2016–2017	Torpedo-BelAZ Zhodino	16	(0)
2018–2020	Isloch Minsk Raion	71	(0)
2021–2022	Dinamo Minsk	50	(0)
2023–2024	Atyrau	48	(0)
2025	Turan	10	(0)
2025–	Atyrau	32	(0)

International career^{‡}
2020–2022	Belarus	7	(0)
- * Club domestic league appearances and goals as of 1 November 2026 ‡ National team caps and goals as of 25 September 2022

Yegor Tadeushevich Khatkevich (Belarusian: Ягор Тадэвушавіч Хаткевіч; Russian: Егор Тадеушевич Хаткевич; born 9 July 1988) is a Belarusian professional footballer who plays for Atyrau.

== International career ==
Khatkevich earned his first cap for the national team of his country on 26 February 2020, keeping a clean sheet in the 1:0 away win over Bulgaria in a friendly match.

== Honours ==
MTZ-RIPO Minsk

- Belarusian Cup winner: 2007–08

Torpedo-BelAZ Zhodino

- Belarusian Cup winner: 2015–16
