= Ruslan Yudenkov =

Belarusian footballer

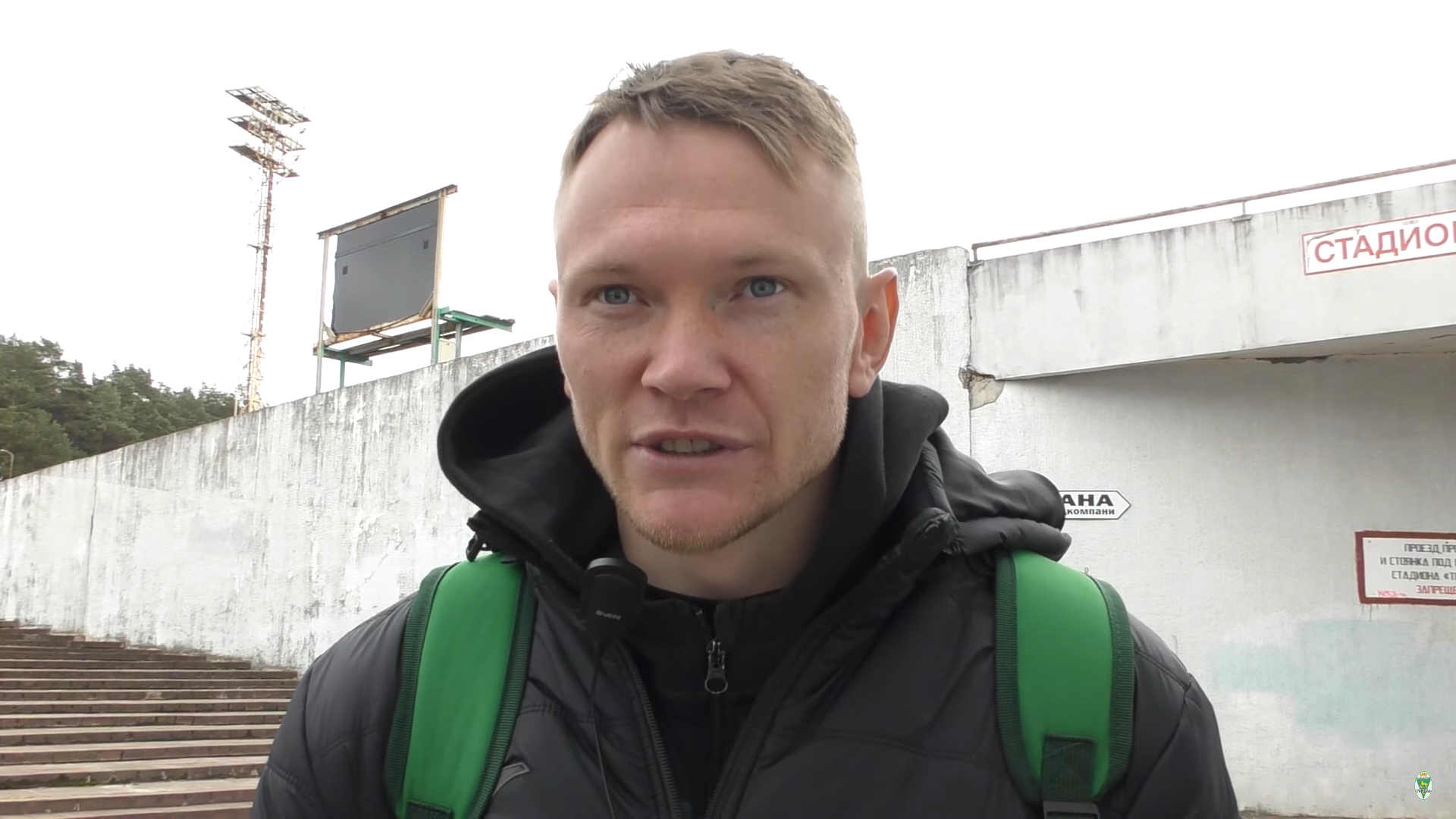

Personal information
- Date of birth: 28 April 1987 (age 39)
- Place of birth: Gomel, Belarusian SSR, Soviet Union
- Height: 1.87 m (6 ft 2 in)
- Position: Midfielder

Team information
- Current team: Irtysh
- Number: 56

Youth career
- 2005–2006: Dnepr Mogilev

Senior career*
| Years | Team | Apps | (Gls) |
| 2006–2008 | Dnepr Mogilev | 9 | (0) |
| 2008 | Spartak Shklov | 20 | (1) |
| 2009–2010 | Vedrich-97 Rechitsa | 41 | (12) |
| 2010–2011 | Gomel | 10 | (0) |
| 2011–2013 | Slavia Mozyr | 71 | (8) |
| 2014 | Granit Mikashevichi | 5 | (1) |
| 2014–2015 | Gorodeya | 22 | (0) |
| 2016–2021 | Gomel | 145 | (15) |
| 2022–2023 | Maktaaral | 51 | (1) |
| 2024 | Kaisar | 23 | (5) |
| 2025 | Turan | 11 | (0) |
| 2025–2026 | Atyrau | 22 | (3) |
| 2026– | Irtysh | 15 | (4) |

International career^{‡}
| 2021–2022 | Belarus | 10 | (0) |
- * Club domestic league appearances and goals as of 1 November 2026 ‡ National team caps and goals as of 25 September 2022

Ruslan Yudenkov (Belarusian: Руслан Юдзянкоў; Russian: Руслан Юденков; born 28 April 1987) is a Belarusian footballer playing currently for Irtysh.

== International career ==
He made his debut for the Belarus national football team on 8 October 2021 in a World Cup qualifier against Estonia.

== Honours ==
Gomel

- Belarusian Cup: 2010–11, 2021–22
