= Vasily Sovpel =

Belarusian footballer

Personal information
- Full name: Vasily Dmitriyevich Sovpel
- Date of birth: 20 March 1999 (age 27)
- Place of birth: Minsk, Belarus
- Height: 1.87 m (6 ft 2 in)
- Position: Midfielder

Team information
- Current team: Okzhetpes
- Number: 77

Youth career
- 2012–2016: Legia Warsaw

Senior career*
Years	Team	Apps	(Gls)
2018	Dinamo Minsk	0	(0)
2018	→ Chist (loan)	10	(2)
2019–2022	Energetik-BGU Minsk	57	(4)
2021	→ Andijon (loan)	13	(2)
2022	→ Gomel (loan)	17	(0)
2023–2024	Kaisar	46	(9)
2025	Turan	12	(0)
2025	Atyrau	11	(0)
2026–	Okzhetpes	28	(1)
- * Club domestic league appearances and goals as of 1 November 2026

Vasily Dmitriyevich Sovpel (Belarusian: Васіль Дзмітрыевіч Соўпель; Russian: Василий Дмитриевич Совпель; born 20 March 1999) is a Belarusian professional footballer who plays for Okzhetpes.

== Honours ==
Gomel

- Belarusian Cup winner: 2021–22
