= Konstantinos Venizelou =

Cypriot footballer (born 2004)

Personal information
- Full name: Konstantinos Venizelou
- Date of birth: 5 July 2004 (age 22)
- Place of birth: Nicosia, Cyprus
- Height: 1.78 m (5 ft 10 in)
- Position: Midfielder

Team information
- Current team: Othellos Athienou FC
- Number: 78

Youth career
- Omonia

Senior career*
Years	Team	Apps	(Gls)
2020–2023	Omonia	5	(0)
2023-	Othellos Athienou FC	1	(0)
- * Club domestic league appearances and goals as of 23 October 2023

Konstantinos Venizelou (Greek: Κωνσταντίνος Βενιζέλου; born 5 July 2004) is a Cypriot footballer who plays as a midfielder for Othellos Athienou FC.

== Honours ==
Omonia

- Cypriot First Division: 2020–21
- Cypriot Cup: 2022–23
