= Yevgeny Beryozkin =

Belarusian footballer

Personal information
- Full name: Yevgeny Sergeyevich Beryozkin
- Date of birth: 5 July 1996 (age 30)
- Place of birth: Vitebsk, Belarus
- Height: 1.82 m (5 ft 11 1/2 in)
- Position: Midfielder

Team information
- Current team: Yelimay
- Number: 27

Youth career
- 2012: Vitebsk
- 2013–2014: Naftan Novopolotsk

Senior career*
Years	Team	Apps	(Gls)
2012	Vitebsk-2	4	(0)
2014–2016	Naftan Novopolotsk	37	(2)
2017–2020	BATE Borisov	59	(4)
2020–2021	Liepāja	34	(5)
2022	Torpedo-BelAZ Zhodino	28	(3)
2023–2024	Kyzylzhar	44	(10)
2025–	Yelimay	23	(1)

International career^{‡}
2016–2018	Belarus U21	17	(0)
2017	Belarus	1	(0)
- * Club domestic league appearances and goals as of 1 July 2026 ‡ National team caps and goals as of 15 October 2018

Yevgeny Sergeyevich Beryozkin (Belarusian: Яўген Сяргеевіч Бярозкін; Russian: Евгений Сергеевич Берёзкин; born 5 July 1996) is a Belarusian footballer playing currently for Yelimay.

== Honours ==
BATE Borisov

- Belarusian Premier League champion: 2017, 2018
- Belarusian Cup winner: 2019–20
- Belarusian Super Cup winner: 2017

Liepāja

- Latvian Football Cup winner: 2020
