= Konstantin Dorofeyev =

Russian footballer

Personal information
- Full name: Konstantin Sergeyevich Dorofeyev
- Date of birth: 17 August 2005 (age 21)
- Place of birth: Krasnodar, Russia
- Height: 1.88 m (6 ft 2 in)
- Position: Forward

Team information
- Current team: Atyrau (on loan from Krasnodar)
- Number: 14

Youth career
- –2021: Football academy Krasnodar
- 2021: Chertanovo Moscow
- 2021–2022: Football academy Krasnodar

Senior career*
Years	Team	Apps	(Gls)
2023	Pioner Leningradskaya (amateur)		
2023–	Krasnodar	0	(0)
2024	→ Krasnodar-2	16	(3)
2025	→ Turan (loan)	12	(1)
2025	→ Atyrau (loan)	11	(5)
2026–	→ Atyrau (loan)	30	(2)

International career^{‡}
2024–	Russia U-21	8	(3)
- * Club domestic league appearances and goals as of 1 November 2026 ‡ National team caps and goals as of 13 October 2025

Konstantin Sergeyevich Dorofeyev (Russian: Константин Сергеевич Дорофеев; born 17 August 2005) is a Russian footballer who plays as a forward for Atyrau, on loan from Krasnodar.

== Club career ==
He made his debut in the Russian Second League for Krasnodar-2 on 20 July 2024 in a game against Metallurg Lipetsk.

He made his debut in the Kazakhstan Premier League for Turan on 2 March 2025 in a game against Okzhetpes.

On 23 June 2025, Dorofeyev moved on a new loan to Atyrau.
