= Mario Rabiu =

Nigerian footballer (born 2000)

Personal information
- Full name: Rabiu Mario Oyindamola Riliwan
- Date of birth: 6 February 2000 (age 26)
- Place of birth: Lagos, Nigeria
- Height: 1.71 m (5 ft 7 in)
- Position: Defensive midfielder

Team information
- Current team: Atyrau
- Number: 4

Youth career
- 2016-2017: Abuja Football College

Senior career*
Years	Team	Apps	(Gls)
2018–2022	Modena	48	(3)
2022	→ Grosseto (loan)	11	(0)
2023	Viterbese	10	(0)
2023–2025	Skënderbeu	58	(1)
2025–2026	Aktobe	5	(0)
2026–	Atyrau	25	(2)
- * Club domestic league appearances and goals as of 1 November 2026

Rabiu Mario Oyindamola Riliwan (born 6 February 2000), known as Mario Rabiu, is a Nigerian professional footballer who plays as a defensive midfielder for Kazakhstan Premier League club Atyrau.

== Career ==
=== Modena ===
After three years of playing with Abuja Football College, Mario Rabiu moved to Italian club Modena, in Emilia-Romagna, Northern Italy on 5 October 2018, Starting his first senior career matches. He won promotion (playoffs) with the club in the Serie D campionato, moving to Serie C, Then winning Serie C campionato, moving to Serie B with The club. He made his Serie C debut for Modena on 31 August 2019 in a game against Piacenza.

=== Loan to Grosseto ===
On 18 January 2022, Mario Rabiu joined Serie C club Grosseto on loan from Modena . He made his professional Serie C debut for Grosseto on 9 April 2022 in a game against Delfino Pescara 1936.

At the end of his loan at Grosseto, Mario Rabiu was released on 1 September 2022, his contract terminated by mutual consent by Modena.

=== Viterbese ===
On 3 January 2023, Mario Rabiu moved to Serie C club Viterbese on a two-year contract. He made his Serie C debut for Viterbese on 7 January 2023 in a game against Fidelis Andria.

== Honours ==
Modena

- Serie C: 2021–22
