= Vyacheslav Levchuk =

Belarusian footballer and manager

Personal information
- Full name: Vyacheslav Dmitriyevich Levchuk
- Date of birth: 19 May 1971 (age 55)
- Place of birth: Gomel, Belarusian SSR
- Height: 1.80 m (5 ft 11 in)
- Position: Defender

Team information
- Current team: Aktobe (caretaker manager)

Youth career
- DYuSSh Gomel

Senior career*
Years	Team	Apps	(Gls)
1987–1991	Gomselmash Gomel	109	(1)
1992–1993	Dnepr Mogilev	19	(0)
1993–1996	MPKC Mozyr	94	(1)
1997–2000	Gomel	84	(1)

Managerial career
- 2001: Gomel (assistant)
- 2002–2003: Gomel-2
- 2004–2008: Sheriff Tiraspol (scout)
- 2009: Gomel (scout)
- 2010: Karpaty Lviv (assistant)
- 2011–2013: Sevastopol (scout)
- 2014–2015: Gomel (assistant)
- 2016–2017: Dnepr Mogilev (assistant)
- 2018: Dnepr Mogilev
- 2018–2021: Sputnik Rechitsa
- 2021: Dnepr Mogilev
- 2022: Rubin Yalta
- 2023: Kuban Krasnodar (assistant)
- 2023: Bumprom Gomel (assistant)
- 2024: Dzhalal-Abad
- 2025: Aktobe (assistant)
- 2025–: Aktobe (caretaker)
- * Club domestic league appearances and goals

Vyacheslav Levchuk (Belarusian: Вячаслаў Ляўчук; Russian: Вячеслав Левчук; born 19 May 1971) is a Belarusian professional football coach and a former player. He is the caretaker manager of Kazakhstani club Aktobe.

== Career ==
Levchuk spent his playing career in Gomel (Gomselmash), Dnepr Mogilev and MPKC Mozyr. In 1996 he won a double with MPKC.

After working as an assistant coach and scout for several clubs, he was appointed as Dnepr Mogilev manager in January 2018.

== Honours ==
MPKC Mozyr

- Belarusian Premier League champion: 1996
- Belarusian Cup winner: 1995–96
