= Kevin Rolón =

Uruguayan football player (born 2001)

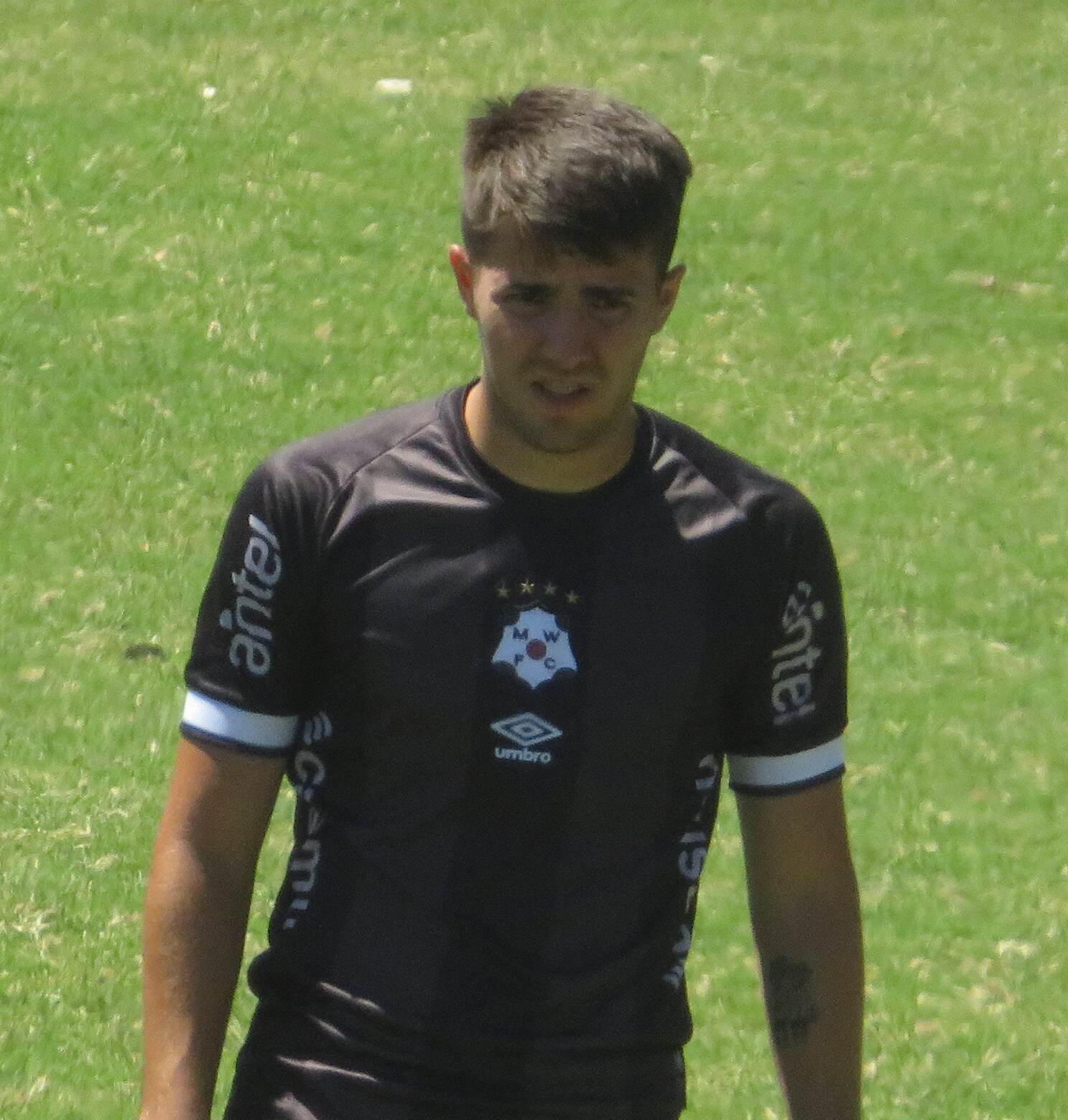
- Rolón with Montevideo Wanderers in 2023

Personal information
- Full name: Kevin Adrián Rolón Benítez
- Date of birth: 2 March 2001 (age 25)
- Place of birth: Bella Unión, Uruguay
- Height: 1.75 m (5 ft 9 in)
- Positions: Left-back; left winger

Team information
- Current team: Elimai
- Number: 21

Youth career
- 2015–2021: Montevideo Wanderers

Senior career*
Years	Team	Apps	(Gls)
2021–2024	Montevideo Wanderers	113	(6)
2025–	Elimai	22	(4)
- * Club domestic league appearances and goals as of 2 November 2025

Kevin Adrián Rolón Benítez (born 2 March 2001) is a Uruguayan professional footballer who plays as a left-back or left winger for Kazakhstan Premier League club Elimai.

== Club career ==
A youth academy graduate of Montevideo Wanderers, Rolón made his professional debut on 10 February 2021 in a 3–2 league win against Rentistas. He scored his team's second goal in the match, before getting replaced by Lucas Morales.

In February 2025, Rolon joined Kazakh club Elimai. This made him the second ever Uruguayan footballer to play in the Kazakh league after Hugo Silveira.

== International career ==
Rolón is a former Uruguay youth international.

== Career statistics ==
As of 24 October 2022

Appearances and goals by club, season and competition
Club	Season	League			Cup		Continental		Other		Total	
Club	Season	Division	Apps	Goals	Apps	Goals	Apps	Goals	Apps	Goals	Apps	Goals
Montevideo Wanderers	2020	Uruguayan Primera División	5	1	—		—		—		5	1
Montevideo Wanderers	2021	Uruguayan Primera División	23	0	—		1 (Note: Appearance in Copa Libertadores.)	1	0	0	24	1
Montevideo Wanderers	2022	Uruguayan Primera División	30	0	2	0	6 (Note: Appearances in Copa Sudamericana.)	0	—		38	0
Career total			58	1	2	0	7	1	0	0	67	2
