= Sergey Ignatovich =

Belarusian footballer

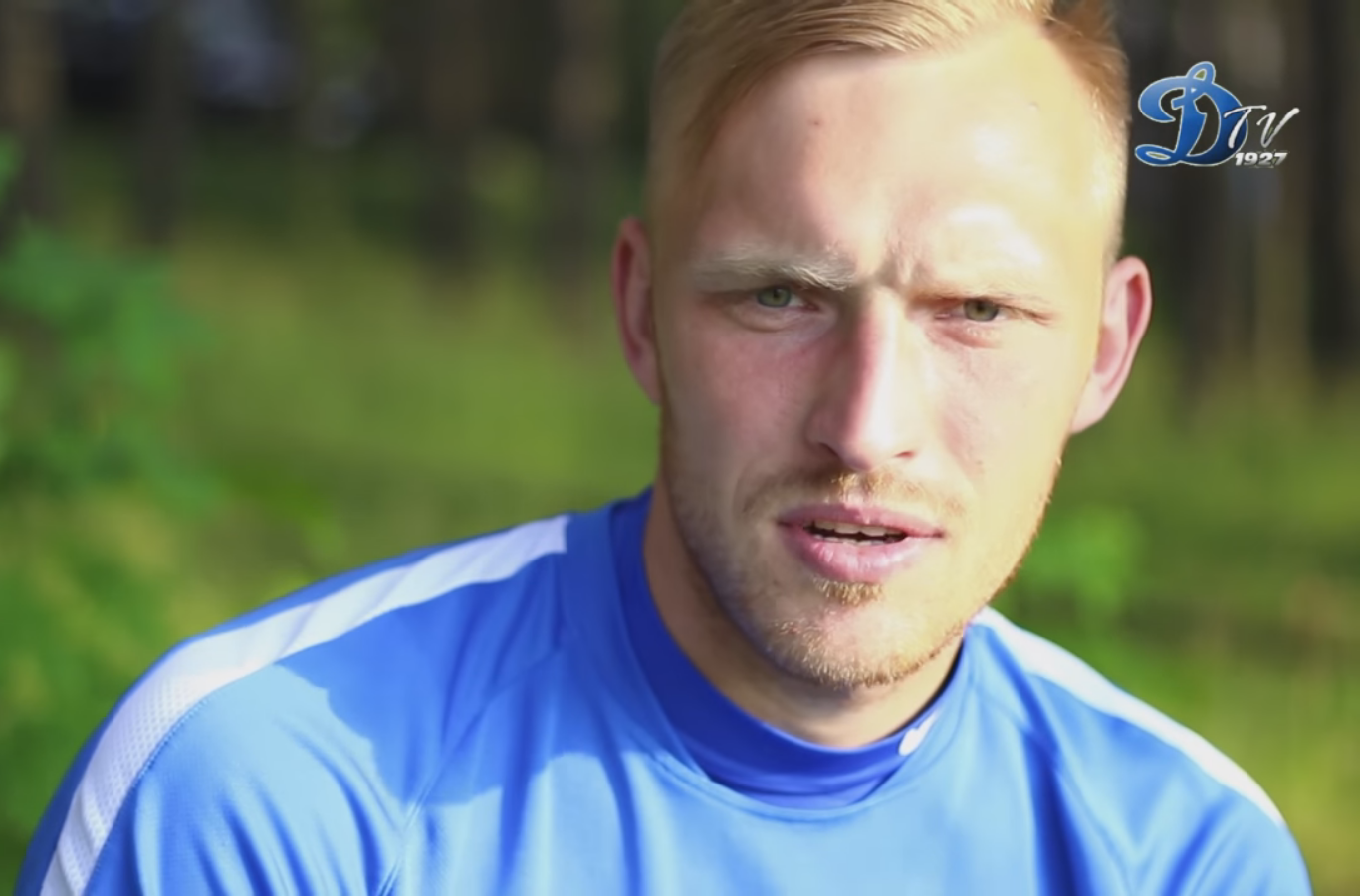
- Sergey Ignatovich in 2016

Personal information
- Full name: Sergey Sergeyevich Ignatovich
- Date of birth: 29 June 1992 (age 34)
- Place of birth: Mogilev, Belarus
- Height: 1.92 m (6 ft 3 1/2 in)
- Position: Goalkeeper

Team information
- Current team: Torpedo-BelAZ Zhodino
- Number: 1

Youth career
- 2009–2010: Dinamo Minsk

Senior career*
Years	Team	Apps	(Gls)
2011–2019	Dinamo Minsk	48	(0)
2012	→ Bereza-2010 (loan)	10	(0)
2013	→ Bereza-2010 (loan)	20	(0)
2020	Dinamo Brest	18	(0)
2021	Minsk	3	(0)
2022	Isloch Minsk Raion	24	(0)
2023–2024	Shakhtyor Soligorsk	26	(0)
2024	Ordabasy	8	(0)
2025	Jenis	24	(0)
2026–	Torpedo-BelAZ Zhodino	12	(0)

International career^{‡}
2012	Belarus U21	3	(0)
2017–	Belarus	9	(0)
- * Club domestic league appearances and goals as of 3 July 2026 ‡ National team caps and goals as of 11 June 2024

Sergey Sergeyevich Ignatovich (Belarusian: Сяргей Сяргеевіч Ігнатовіч; Russian: Сергей Сергеевич Игнатович; born 29 June 1992) is a Belarusian professional football player who plays for Belarusian Premier League club Torpedo-BelAZ Zhodino. He has also represented and the Belarus national team and Belarus U21.

== Honours ==
Dinamo Brest

- Belarusian Super Cup winner: 2020

Shakhtyor Soligorsk

- Belarusian Super Cup winner: 2023
