= Rui Batalha =

Portuguese footballer

Personal information
- Full name: Rui Pedro Reis Batalha
- Date of birth: 29 June 1996 (age 30)
- Place of birth: Santo Isidoro, Mafra, Portugal
- Height: 1.69 m (5 ft 7 in)
- Position: Winger

Team information
- Current team: Lusitano de Évora
- Number: 7

Youth career
- 2005–2009: Sporting
- 2009–2011: Mafra
- 2011–2012: Sintrense
- 2012–2014: Sacavenense
- 2014–2015: Gil Vicente

Senior career*
Years	Team	Apps	(Gls)
2014	Sacavenense	1	(0)
2015	Gil Vicente	0	(0)
2015–2016	Malveira	22	(5)
2016–2017	Loures	31	(15)
2017–2019	Torreense	45	(8)
2019–2021	Real	15	(10)
2021	Olímpico Montijo	9	(2)
2021–2022	Cova da Piedade	17	(4)
2022	Belenenses	10	(2)
2022–2023	Oliveira Hospital	28	(13)
2023–2024	Alverca	9	(1)
2024	→ 1º Dezembro (loan)	10	(1)
2024–2025	1º Dezembro	26	(7)
2025	Jenis	11	(1)
2026	Šiauliai	14	(2)
2026–	Lusitano de Évora	5	(1)
- * Club domestic league appearances and goals as of 12 September 2026

Rui Pedro Reis Batalha (born 29 June 1996) is a Portuguese professional footballer who plays as a winger for Liga 3 club Lusitano de Évora.

== Career ==
On 21 January 2015, Batalha made his professional debut with Gil Vicente in a 2014–15 Taça da Liga match against Marítimo.

On 16 January 2026, FA Šiauliai announced the signing of Rui Batalha.

On 23 January 2026, he made his debut in TOPLYGA against FK Transinvest.

On 20 April 2026 Rui Batalha scored goal in TOPLYGA against FK Panevėžys.

On 8 June 2026, it was officially announced that Rui Batalha had left FA Šiauliai.
