= José Carrillo =

Spanish footballer

Personal information
- Full name: José Carrillo Mancilla
- Date of birth: 4 March 1995 (age 31)
- Place of birth: Granada, Spain
- Height: 1.85 m (6 ft 1 in)
- Position: Centre-back

Team information
- Current team: Jaén
- Number: 4

Senior career*
Years	Team	Apps	(Gls)
2012	Mallorca B	0	(0)
2014–2015	Zamora	33	(0)
2015–2016	Getafe B	19	(0)
2016–2017	Logroñés	3	(0)
2017–2020	Zemplín Michalovce	80	(4)
2020–2021	Senica	23	(0)
2022	Finn Harps	23	(1)
2023	El Paso Locomotive	4	(0)
2024–2025	Samtredia	26	(0)
2025–2026	Ulytau	23	(0)
2026–	Jaén	7	(0)
- * Club domestic league appearances and goals as of 7 May 2026

José Carrillo Mancilla (born 4 March 1995), simply known as José Carrillo, is a Spanish professional footballer who plays as a centre-back for Segunda Federación club Jaén.

== Club career ==
José Carrillo made his debut in Slovakia on 29 July 2017, against Nitra, in a goal-less tie. In the second half, he was replaced by Martin Koscelník.

On 5 January 2022, Carrillo was unveiled as a new signing at League of Ireland Premier Division club Finn Harps for the 2022 season.

Carrillo signed with USL Championship side El Paso Locomotive on 26 June 2023. On 1 November 2023, it was announced that Carrillo would not be returning for the 2024 season.
