= Maksim Kovel =

Belarusian footballer

Personal information
- Date of birth: 12 January 1999 (age 27)
- Place of birth: Minsk, Belarus
- Height: 1.82 m (6 ft 0 in)
- Position: Defender

Team information
- Current team: Dynamo Brest
- Number: 5

Youth career
- 2017–2019: BATE Borisov

Senior career*
Years	Team	Apps	(Gls)
2019–2020	BATE Borisov	0	(0)
2019	→ Sputnik Rechitsa (loan)	15	(0)
2020	→ Arsenal Dzerzhinsk (loan)	7	(0)
2020	→ Smolevichi (loan)	7	(0)
2021–2024	Isloch Minsk Raion	49	(2)
2025	Zhetysu	19	(2)
2026–	Dynamo Brest	6	(0)
- * Club domestic league appearances and goals as of 6 July 2026

Maksim Kovel (Belarusian: Максім Ковель; Russian: Максим Ковель; born 12 January 1999) is a Belarusian professional footballer who plays for Dynamo Brest.

== Honours ==
BATE Borisov

- Belarusian Cup winner: 2019–20
