= FC Turan =

Kazakh football club

Turan
- Full name: Football Club Turan; Тұран футбол клубы
- Founded: 2002; 24 years ago
- Ground: Turkistan Arena
- Capacity: 7,000
- Chairman: Yerkebulan Khadzhbayev
- Manager: Rinat Alyuetov
- League: Kazakhstan Premier League
- 2024: 12th
- Website: turan-fc.kz
| Home colours | Away colours |

FC Turan (Kazakh: Тұран футбол клубы, Tūran futbol kluby) is a Kazakh professional football club based in Turkistan. Founded in 2002, the club competes in the Kazakhstan Premier League and plays home matches at the Turkistan Arena.

== History ==
On 12 January 2021, Turan were promoted to the Kazakhstan Premier League for the first time after the league increased its participants from 12 to 14 club.

=== Names ===
- 2002: Founded as Kostuin
- 2004: Renamed Arys
- 2021: Renamed Turan

== League and cup record ==
| Champions | Runners-up | Third place | Promoted | Relegated |

| Season | League | | | | | | | | | | Kazakhstan Cup | Top goalscorer | | Manager |
| Season | Tier | Pos. | P | W | D | L | F | A | GD | Pts | Kazakhstan Cup | Name | League | Manager |
|---|---|---|---|---|---|---|---|---|---|---|---|---|---|---|
| 2002 | 3 | 3rd | 10 | 5 | 3 | 2 | 20 | 11 | 9 | 18 | - | | | |
| 2003 | 2 | 9th | 20 | 5 | 1 | 14 | 26 | 55 | -29 | 16 | Last 32 | | | |
| 2004 | 2 | 13th | 24 | 2 | 0 | 22 | 10 | 80 | -70 | 6 | Last 64 | | | |
| 2019 | 3 | 2nd | 32 | 21 | 4 | 7 | 63 | 31 | 32 | 67 | Group Stage | (Kazakhstan) Yerkasym Yeshenkul | 14 | |
| 2020 | 2 | 2nd | 12 | 6 | 3 | 3 | 19 | 16 | 3 | 21 | - | | | |
| 2021 | 1 | 12th | 26 | 5 | 11 | 10 | 22 | 40 | -18 | 26 | Group Stage | (Kazakhstan) Temirlan Amirov | 5 | (Kazakhstan) Abdukhalik Buribayev |
| 2022 | 1 | 13th | 26 | 6 | 10 | 10 | 25 | 35 | -10 | 28 | Group Stage | (Kazakhstan) Shokhan Abzalov | 4 | (Kazakhstan) Vladimir Gazzayev (Kazakhstan) Kuanysh Kabdulov (Interim) (Kazakhstan) Sergey Kogay (Interim) (Kazakhstan) Aleksandr Kuchma |

Key

- Pos. = Position in league; P = Games played; W = Games won; D = Games drawn; L = Games lost; F = Goals scored; A = Goals conceded; GD = Goals difference; Pts = Points gained

== Current squad ==
As of 15 August, 2026

Note: Flags indicate national team as defined under FIFA eligibility rules; some limited exceptions apply. Players may hold more than one non-FIFA nationality.

| No. | Pos. | Nation | Player |
|---|---|---|---|
| 2 | DF | KAZ | Bogdan Savkiv |
| 4 | DF | KAZ | Karam Sultanov |
| 5 | DF | KAZ | Askar Satyshev |
| 6 | MF | KAZ | Bekzat Kurmanbekuly |
| 7 | FW | KAZ | Sayat Baktybay |
| 8 | MF | KAZ | Kuanysh Duysenbekuly |
| 9 | FW | KAZ | Miras Turlybek |
| 10 | MF | KAZ | Duman Narzildayev |
| 11 | FW | KAZ | Edige Oralbay |
| 12 | DF | KAZ | Ualikhan Mukhametzhanov |
| 14 | FW | KAZ | Artur Piskun |
| 16 | GK | KAZ | Sayatkhan Kusainov (on loan from Aktobe II) |
| 17 | FW | KAZ | Matvey Gerasimov |
| 21 | FW | KAZ | Yerkebulan Tungyshbayev |

| No. | Pos. | Nation | Player |
|---|---|---|---|
| 22 | DF | KAZ | Dmitriy Kolesnichenko |
| 27 | MF | KAZ | Miras Rakhmetov |
| 28 | MF | KAZ | Ruslan Valiullin |
| 29 | FW | KAZ | Orken Makhan |
| 31 | FW | KAZ | Arman Smailov |
| 33 | DF | KAZ | Temirlan Murzagaliev (on loan from Kaisar) |
| 35 | GK | KAZ | Nikita Kalmykov |
| 42 | DF | KAZ | Daniil Sobolev |
| 71 | DF | KAZ | Samat Shamshi |
| 73 | FW | KAZ | Didar Zhalmukan |
| 78 | DF | KAZ | Elkhan Saidov |
| 80 | MF | KAZ | Arman Kenesov (on loan from Aktobe) |
| 88 | MF | KAZ | Arafat Moldagaliev |
| 97 | FW | KAZ | Alimzhan Erken (on loan from Kaisar) |
