= 2025 FC Kairat season =

FC Kairat
2025 season
- Chairman: Kairat Boranbayev
- Manager: Rafael Urazbakhtin
- Stadium: Central Stadium
- Premier League: Winners
- Super Cup: Winners
- Kazakhstan Cup: Quarter-finals
- UEFA Champions League: League phase
- Top goalscorer: League: Dastan Satpayev (14); All: Dastan Satpayev (18)
- Highest home attendance: 23,800 vs Zhetysu (5 October 2025)
- Lowest home attendance: 4,785 vs Ulytau (2 August 2025)
- Average home league attendance: 10,589 (26 October 2025)
Home colours	Away colours	Third colours

The 2025 FC Kairat season is the 15th successive season that the club played in the Kazakhstan Premier League, the highest tier of association football in Kazakhstan, since their promotion back to the top flight in 2009.

== Season events ==
On 22 November 2024, Kairat announced the signing of Yerkin Tapalov from Tobol to a one-year contract with the option of an additional year.

On 20 December 2024, Kairat announced the signing of Jorginho from Differdange 03 to a two-year contract.

On 10 January, Kairat announced the signing of Aleksandr Zarutskiy, who'd played for Astana the previous season, to a one-year contract.

On 15 January, Kairat announced the signing of Dan Glazer from Pari NN, to a two-year contract.

On 12 June, Kairat announced the signing of Edmilson from Celje, on a contract until the end of June 2027.

On 19 June, Kairat announced the signing of Ricardinho on a one-year loan deal from Viktoria Plzeň.

On 5 December, Kairat announced that they had extended their contract with Damir Kasabulat, until the end of the 2027 season.

== Squad ==
As of match played 9 December 2025

No.	Name	Nationality	Position	Date of birth (age)	Signed from	Signed in	Contract ends	Apps.	Goals
Goalkeepers
1	Aleksandr Zarutskiy	(Kazakhstan)	GK	26 August 1993 (aged 32)	Unattached	2025	2025	24	0
77	Temirlan Anarbekov	(Kazakhstan)	GK	14 October 2003 (aged 22)	Academy	2020		22	0
82	Sherkhan Kalmurza	(Kazakhstan)	GK	15 June 2007 (aged 18)	Academy	2025		5	0
Defenders
3	Luís Mata	(Portugal)	DF	6 July 1997 (aged 28)	Zagłębie Lubin	2025		36	0
4	Damir Kasabulat	(Kazakhstan)	DF	29 August 2002 (aged 23)	Kairat Moscow	2022	2027	121	0
5	Lev Kurgin	(Kazakhstan)	DF	6 June 2002 (aged 23)	Kairat Moscow	2022		53	0
14	Alyaksandr Martynovich	(Belarus)	DF	26 August 1987 (aged 38)	Rubin Kazan	2024	2025	51	5
20	Yerkin Tapalov	(Kazakhstan)	DF	3 September 1993 (aged 32)	Tobol	2025	2025 (+1)	33	1
24	Aleksandr Mrynskiy	(Kazakhstan)	DF	15 July 2004 (aged 21)	Academy	2022		51	1
25	Aleksandr Shirobokov	(Kazakhstan)	DF	2 January 2003 (aged 22)	Academy	2020		44	1
59	Daniyar Tashpulatov	(Kazakhstan)	DF	22 August 2007 (aged 18)	Academy	2025		4	0
80	Yegor Sorokin	(Russia)	DF	4 November 1995 (aged 30)	Unattached	2024	2025	52	2
Midfielders
6	Adilet Sadybekov	(Kazakhstan)	MF	26 May 2002 (aged 23)	Academy	2021	2025	87	7
10	Giorgi Zaria	(Georgia (country))	MF	14 July 1997 (aged 28)	Dinamo Batumi	2024		59	15
15	Ofri Arad	(Israel)	MF	11 September 1998 (aged 27)	Maccabi Haifa	2024		92	3
17	Olzhas Baybek	(Kazakhstan)	MF	11 February 2005 (aged 20)	Academy	2024		21	1
18	Dan Glazer	(Israel)	MF	20 September 1996 (aged 29)	Pari NN	2025	2026	27	0
33	Jug Stanojev	(Serbia)	MF	29 July 1999 (aged 26)	Spartak Subotica	2024	2027	47	3
55	Valery Gromyko	(Belarus)	MF	23 January 1997 (aged 28)	Kaisar	2024	2025	55	7
Forwards
7	Jorginho	(Portugal)	FW	9 November 1997 (aged 28)	Differdange 03	2025	2026	43	12
9	Dastan Satpayev	(Kazakhstan)	FW	12 August 2008 (aged 17)	Academy	2024		42	19
11	João Paulo	(Brazil)	FW	2 June 1988 (aged 37)	Ordabasy	2021		110	47
19	Élder Santana	(Brazil)	FW	7 April 1993 (aged 32)	Aktobe	2024		31	5
26	Edmilson	(Brazil)	FW	19 April 1997 (aged 28)	Celje	2025	2027	20	5
81	Ismail Bekbolat	(Kazakhstan)	FW	10 January 2008 (aged 17)	Academy	2025		9	0
87	Azamat Tuyakbaev	(Kazakhstan)	FW	13 July 2007 (aged 18)	Academy	2025		5	1
89	Ramazan Bagdat	(Kazakhstan)	FW	9 October 2006 (aged 19)	Academy	2025		17	3
99	Ricardinho	(Brazil)	FW	23 April 2001 (aged 24)	on loan from Viktoria Plzeň	2025	2026	22	2
Players away on loan
2	Egor Tkachenko	(Kazakhstan)	DF	14 April 2003 (aged 22)	Kairat Moscow	2022		39	0
	Yan Trufanov	(Kazakhstan)	FW	17 May 2004 (aged 21)	Academy	2022		20	4
	Gleb Valgushev	(Kazakhstan)	FW	12 December 2005 (aged 19)	Academy	2025		0	0
Left during the season
44	Luka Gadrani	(Georgia (country))	DF	12 April 1997 (aged 28)	Aktobe	2024		21	2

== Transfers ==
=== In ===
Date	Position	Nationality	Name	From	Fee	Ref.
1 January 2025	DF	(Kazakhstan)	Yerkin Tapalov	Tobol	Undisclosed	
1 January 2025	FW	(Portugal)	Jorginho	Differdange 03	Undisclosed	
10 January 2025	GK	(Kazakhstan)	Aleksandr Zarutskiy	Unattached	Free	
15 January 2025	MF	(Israel)	Dan Glazer	Pari NN	Undisclosed	
12 June 2025	FW	(Brazil)	Edmilson	Celje	Undisclosed	

=== Loans in ===
Date from	Position	Nationality	Name	From	Date to	Ref.
27 February 2025	DF	(Portugal)	Luís Mata	Zagłębie Lubin	30 June 2025	
19 June 2025	FW	(Brazil)	Ricardinho	Viktoria Plzeň	30 June 2026	

=== Out ===
Date	Position	Nationality	Name	To	Fee	Ref.
6 January 2025	MF	(Kazakhstan)	Daniyar Usenov	Tobol	Undisclosed	
7 January 2025	GK	(Kazakhstan)	Nikita Pivkin	Elimai	Undisclosed	
5 September 2025	DF	(Georgia (country))	Luka Gadrani	Beitar Jerusalem	Undisclosed	

=== Loans out ===
Date from	Position	Nationality	Name	To	Date to	Ref.
1 January 2025	FW	(Kazakhstan)	Gleb Valgushev	Kyzylzhar	End of season	
22 January 2025	DF	(Kazakhstan)	Egor Tkachenko	Elimai	End of season	

=== Released ===
Date	Position	Nationality	Name	Joined	Date	Ref.
4 January 2025	GK	(Russia)	Vadim Ulyanov	Akhmat Grozny	15 January 2025	
6 January 2025	MF	(Kazakhstan)	Yerkebulan Seydakhmet	Aktobe	9 February 2025	
31 December 2025	GK	(Kazakhstan)	Aleksandr Zarutsky	Aktobe	1 January 2026	
31 December 2025	FW	(Brazil)	João Paulo			

== Competitions ==
=== Overview ===
Competition	First match	Last match	Starting round	Final position	Record							
Competition	First match	Last match	Starting round	Final position	Pld	W	D	L	GF	GA	GD	Win %
Premier League	2 March 2025	26 October 2025	Matchday 1	Winners	26	18	5	3	53	19	+34	69.23
Super Cup	22 February 2025	22 February 2025	Final	Winners	1	1	0	0	2	0	+2	100.00
Kazakhstan Cup	12 April 2025	14 May 2025	Round of 16	Quarter-finals	2	1	0	1	3	1	+2	50.00
UEFA Champions League	8 July 2025	2026 season	Second qualifying round	League Phase	14	4	4	6	11	19	−8	28.57
Total					43	24	9	10	69	39	+30	55.81

Last updated: 9 December 2025
Source: Competitions

=== Super Cup ===
23 February 2025	Kairat	2–0	Aktobe	Astana
15:00 (UTC+6)	Tapalov (yellow card) 32' (yellow-red card) 62'; Santana 58'; Gromyko 87' (yellow card) 89'	Report	Skvortsov (yellow card) 2'; Seydakhmet (yellow card) 45+1'; Kasym (yellow card) 66'; Ivkovic (yellow card) 90+4'	Stadium: Astana Arena; Attendance: 23,975; Referee: Sayat Karabayev

=== Premier League ===
==== Results summary ====
Overall								Home						Away					
Pld	W	D	L	GF	GA	GD	Pts	W	D	L	GF	GA	GD	W	D	L	GF	GA	GD
26	18	5	3	53	19	+34	59	9	2	2	30	9	+21	9	3	1	23	10	+13

Last updated: 26 October 2025.
Source: See Results

==== Results by round ====
Round	1	2	3	16	4	5	6	7	8	9	10	11	12	13	14	15	17	18	19	21	22	23	20	24	25	26
Ground	A	H	A	A	H	A	H	A	A	A	H	A	A	H	A	H	A	A	H	H	A	H	H	H	A	H
Result	D	W	W	W	W	D	W	W	W	L	L	W	D	W	W	W	D	W	W	L	W	W	W	W	W	D
Position	5	1	1	1	1	1	1	1	1	1	3	2	2	2	2	2	2	2	1	2	2	2	2	1	1	1

Source: See Results
A = Away; H = Home; W = Win; D = Draw; L = Loss; P = Bye

==== Results ====
2 March 2025 1	Astana	1–1	Kairat	Astana
18:00 (UTC+5)	Tomasov 41'; Vorogovsky (yellow card) 81'	Report	Kasabulat (yellow card) 42'; Glazer (yellow card) 59'; Satpayev 67'	Stadium: Astana Arena; Attendance: 26,153; Referee: Bulat Sariev

8 March 2025 2	Kairat	4–0	Ordabasy	Almaty
18:00 (UTC+5)	Zaria 9', 45+2' (pen.); Glazer (yellow card) 22'; João Paulo 38'; Stanojev 73'	Report	Saliman (yellow card) 78'; Shvyryov (red card) 85'	Stadium: Central Stadium; Attendance: 6,899; Referee: Daniyar Sakhi

29 March 2025 3	Turan	1–2	Kairat	Turkistan
16:00 (UTC+5)	Askarov (yellow card) 23'; Yudenkov (yellow card) 52'; Stasevich 53'; Milojko (yellow card) 58'; Pajovic (yellow card) 60'; Mukhtorov (yellow card) 90+1'	Report	Shirobokov (yellow card) 12' (red card) 48'; Zaria 30' (pen.); Jorginho (yellow card) 44' (goal) 75'; Tapalov (yellow card) 74'; Zarutskiy (yellow card) 79'	Stadium: Turkistan Arena; Attendance: 3,700; Referee: Alexander Zatula

6 April 2025 16	Atyrau	1–4	Kairat	Atyrau
15:00 (UTC+5)	Askarov (yellow card) 7'; Chunchukov 56'; Chaduneli (yellow card) 61' (red card) 90'; Kybyray (yellow card) 89'	Report	Satpayev 51', 54'; Stanojev 71'; Jorginho 79'; Kasabulat (yellow card) 86'; Martynovich (yellow card) 90'	Stadium: Munaishy Stadium; Attendance: 4,000; Referee: Georgy Chekhovsky

16 April 2025 5	Kairat	4–0	Atyrau	Almaty
19:00 (UTC+5)	Satpayev 1'; Tapalov 6'; Martynovich 50'; Jorginho 58'; Sorokin (yellow card) 86'	Report	Abzalov (yellow card) 19'	Stadium: Central Stadium; Attendance: 5,342; Referee: Sanzhar Iskakov

20 April 2025 5	Kaisar	0–0	Kairat	Kyzylorda
15:00 (UTC+5)	Kenesbek (yellow card) 35'; Kalmuratov (yellow card) 79'	Report	Sorokin (yellow card) 79'	Stadium: Gani Muratbayev Stadium; Attendance: 3,500; Referee: Timur Kumashev

27 April 2025 6	Kairat	2–1	Tobol	Almaty
17:00 (UTC+5)	Gromyko 4'; Zaria (penalty missed) 35'; Satpayev (yellow card) 45+2'; Jorginho 60'; Stanojev (yellow card) 90+4'	Report	Essien (yellow card) 32'; Vukčević (yellow card) 66'; Zuyev 79'	Stadium: Central Stadium; Attendance: 9,754; Referee: Anton Kuchma

3 May 2025 7	Ulytau	1–4	Kairat	Jezkazgan
15:00 (UTC+5)	Pavlov (yellow card) 62'; Chalkin 78' (yellow card) 84'	Report	Satpayev 30', 68'; Martynovich 48'; Arad (yellow card) 49'; Zaria 68'	Stadium: Metallurg Stadium; Attendance: 3,800; Referee: Sanzhar Iskakov

9 May 2025 8	Zhenis	1–2	Kairat	Arena
19:00 (UTC+5)	Mukanov (yellow card) 45+1'; Saulet (yellow card) 61'; Mika 77' (pen.)	Report	Zaria 26' (pen.); Gromyko 36'; Anarbekov (red card) 46'; Arad (yellow card) 50'; Gromyko (yellow card) 55'; Zarutskiy (yellow card) 87'	Stadium: Astana Arena; Attendance: 8,500; Referee: Denis Tevyashov

18 May 2025 9	Elimai	1–0	Kairat	Semey
19:30 (UTC+5)	Sviridov (yellow card) 67' (goal) 90'; Odeyobo (yellow card) 70'; Korzun (yellow card) 75'	Report	Mata (yellow card) 56'; Zaria (yellow card) 64'	Stadium: Spartak Stadium; Attendance: 8,300; Referee: Sanzhar Iskakov

24 May 2025 10	Kairat	1–2	Okzhetpes	Almaty
18:00 (UTC+5)	Satpayev 57'; Sorokin (yellow card) 78'	Report	Zhumat 15' (pen.); Jovanović 52'	Stadium: Central Stadium; Attendance: 6,734; Referee: Arman Ismuratov

30 May 2025 11	Aktobe	1–2	Kairat	Aktobe
20:00 (UTC+5)	Kiki (yellow card) 27'; Kairov (yellow card) 44'; Baydavletov 50' (yellow card) 51'; Ivković (yellow card) 85'; Umayev (yellow card) 90+8' (red card) 90+8'; Anđelković (yellow card) 90+8'	Report	Glazer (yellow card) 44'; Gromyko (yellow card) 45+2' (yellow-red card) 70'; Martynovich 74'; Jorginho (yellow card) 79'; Satpayev 87' (yellow card) 88'; Kasabulat (yellow card) 90+7'	Stadium: Central Stadium; Attendance: 12,400; Referee: Alexander Zatula

14 June 2025 12	Zhetysu	2–2	Kairat	Taldykorgan
18:00 (UTC+5)	Kovel 19'; Serikkul 41'; Orynbasar (yellow card) 85'; Akhmedov (yellow card) 90+4'	Report	Jorginho 36'; Sorokin 51'; Mrynskiy (yellow card) 76'; Mata (yellow card) 90+4'	Stadium: Jetisu Stadium; Attendance: 4,000; Referee: Ruslan Sultangaliev

21 June 2025 13	Kairat	1–0	Kyzylzhar	Almaty
18:00 (UTC+5)	Gromyko (yellow card) 71' (goal) 74'; Mata (yellow card) 76'; Martynovich (yellow card) 84'	Report	Zhangylyshbay (red card) 31'; Eleukin (yellow card) 44'; Sebai (yellow card) 53'; Miroshnichenko (yellow card) 53'	Stadium: Central Stadium; Attendance: 6,378; Referee: Sayat Karabaev

29 June 2025 14	Ordabasy	0–1	Kairat	Shymkent
20:00 (UTC+5)	Čanađija (yellow card) 9'; Astanov (yellow card) 32'; Jimoh (yellow card) 54'; Zhaksybaev (yellow card) 71'	Report	Jorginho 18'; Gromyko (yellow card) 25'; Arad (yellow card) 45+1'; Glazer (yellow card) 47' (yellow-red card) 80'; Kasabulat (yellow card) 48'; Edmilson (red card) 88'; Zarutskiy (yellow card) 90+3'	Stadium: Kazhymukan Munaitpasov Stadium; Attendance: 10,000; Referee: Denis Tevyashov

4 July 2025 15	Kairat	4–0	Turan	Almaty
20:00 (UTC+5)	Ricardinho (yellow card) 2' (goal) 30'; Stanojev 38'; Bagdat 75', 83'	Report	Zulfikarov (yellow card) 58'; Abzalov (yellow card) 60'; Asan (yellow card) 82'	Stadium: Central Stadium; Attendance: 5,137; Referee: Sergey Nozhenko

19 July 2025 17	Kariat	1–1	Kaisar	Almaty
18:00 (UTC+5)	Bagdat (yellow card) 21' (yellow-red card) 53' (goal) 21'; Tashpulatov (yellow card) 31'; Jorginho (yellow card) 90+1'	Report	Kenesbek (yellow card) 29'; Aymanov 54' (pen.)	Stadium: Central Stadium; Attendance: 5,123; Referee: Danil Gorda

26 July 2025 18	Tobol	1–3	Kairat	Kostanay
18:00 (UTC+5)	Essien (yellow card) 55' (yellow-red card) 78'; Cavnić (yellow card) 64'; El Messaoudi 76' (pen.); Ndiaye (yellow card) 85'	Report	Jorginho 45+1'; Shirobokov (yellow card) 67'; Gromyko 68'; Kasabulat (yellow card) 83'; Ricardinho 89'; Zaria (yellow card) 90+3'	Stadium: Central Stadium; Attendance: 7,000; Referee: Daniyar Sakhi

2 August 2025 19	Kairat	1–0	Ulytau	Almaty
18:00 (UTC+5)	Sadybekov (yellow card) 32'; Edmilson 41'; Gromyko (yellow card) 44'	Report	Vachiberadze (yellow card) 39'; Keiler (yellow card) 50'; Pajovic (yellow card) 72'; Maulenov (yellow card) 90+3'	Stadium: Central Stadium; Attendance: 4,785; Referee: Ruslan Sultangaliev

16 August 2025 21	Kairat	2–3	Elimai	Almaty
18:00 (UTC+5)	Edmilson 15', 37'; Tapalov (red card) 90+5'	Report	Arad 45' (o.g.); Tyulyubay (yellow card) 57'; Placca 72', 83'; Orazov (yellow card) 75'; Koval (yellow card) 90+4'; Sviridov (red card) 90+5'	Stadium: Central Stadium; Attendance: 8,954; Referee: Bulat Sariev

31 August 2025 22	Okzhetpes	0–1	Kairat	Kokshetau
16:00 (UTC+5)	Satanov (yellow card) 66'; Enzo (yellow card) 79'	Report	Jorginho 8'	Stadium: Okzhetpes Stadium; Attendance: 4,185; Referee: Saken Bayimbet

14 September 2025 23	Kairat	1–0	Aktobe	Almaty
17:00 (UTC+5)	Satpayev 52'; Kasabulat (yellow card) 89'; Gromyko (yellow card) 90+4'	Report	Tanzharikov (yellow card) 45'; Kusyapov (yellow card) 60'	Stadium: Central Stadium; Attendance: 22,800; Referee: Nurzat Abdykadyrov

22 September 2025 20	Kairat	3–1	Zhenis	Almaty
18:00 (UTC+5)	Edmilson (yellow card) 2'; Satpayev 12', 37'; Saulet 80' (o.g.)	Report	Adílio (yellow card) 21'; Kuat (yellow card) 50' (goal) 52'	Stadium: Central Stadium; Attendance: 9,150; Referee: Sergey Nozhenko

5 October 2025 24	Kairat	5–0	Zhetysu	Almaty
16:00 (UTC+5)	Satpayev 9' (pen.); Jorginho 20', 35'; Mrynskiy (yellow card) 42'; Edmilson 43'; Tuyakbaev 90'	Report	Success (yellow card) 30'; Kashken (yellow card) 61'	Stadium: Central Stadium; Attendance: 23,800; Referee: Saken Bayimbet

17 October 2025 25	Kyzylzhar	0–1	Kairat	Petropavl
15:00 (UTC+5)	Zhangylyshbay (yellow card) 32'; Vasilyev (yellow card) 61'; Buranchiev (red card) 69'; Kozlenko (yellow card) 79'; Gbamblé (yellow card) 90+2'	Report	Satpayev 42'	Stadium: Karasai Stadium; Attendance: 8,000; Referee: Sayat Sulikanov

26 October 2025 26	Kairat	1–1	Astana	Almaty
15:00 (UTC+5)	Satpayev 56'	Report	Tomasov 15'; Shomko (yellow card) 37'	Stadium: Central Stadium; Attendance: 22,800; Referee: Matteo Marchetti

==== League table ====
Pos	Team	Pld	W	D	L	GF	GA	GD	Pts	Qualification or relegation
1	Kairat (C)	26	18	5	3	53	19	+34	59	Qualification for the Champions League first qualifying round
2	Astana	26	17	6	3	66	30	+36	57	Qualification for the Conference League first qualifying round
3	Tobol	26	16	6	4	45	25	+20	54	Qualification for the Conference League second qualifying round (Note: Since the winners of the 2025 Kazakhstan Cup, Tobol, finished in the top three of the Premier League, the remaining Conference League first qualifying round spot was passed to the fourth-placed team.)
4	Elimai	26	14	6	6	47	31	+16	48	Qualification for the Conference League first qualifying round
5	Aktobe	26	13	4	9	39	29	+10	43	

Source: UEFA, Soccerway
Rules for classification: 1) Points; 2) Goal difference; 3) Matches won; 4) Goals scored; 5) Away goals scored; 6) Head-to-head points; 7) Head-to-head matches won; 8) Head-to-head goal difference; 9) Head-to-head goals scored; 10) Head-to-head away goals scored; 11) Draw.
(C) Champions

=== Kazakhstan Cup ===
12 April 2025 Round of 16	Kairat	3–0	Caspiy	Almaty
17:00 (UTC+5)	Zaria 9' (pen.), 45' (pen.); Satpayev 53'	Report	Aytbaev (yellow card) 90+7'; Kozhamberdy (yellow card) 90+11'	Stadium: Central Stadium; Attendance: 4,807; Referee: Artyom Kuchin

14 May 2025 Quarter-finals	Ordabasy	1–0	Kairat	Shymkent
18:00 (UTC+5)	Paulino 34'; Nuraly (yellow card) 54'; Malyi (yellow card) 57'; Abubakar (yellow card) 65'	Report	Gromyko (yellow card) 90+3'	Stadium: Kazhymukan Munaitpasov Stadium; Referee: Marat Iskakov

=== UEFA Champions League ===
==== Qualifying rounds ====
8 July 2025 First qualifying round 1st leg	Olimpija Ljubljana (Slovenia)	1–1	(Kazakhstan) Kairat	Ljubljana, Slovenia
22:00 (UTC+5)	Muhamedbegović (yellow card) 36'; Mitrovski (yellow card) 47'; Pinto 66'; Bristrić (yellow card) 89'	Report	Gromyko (yellow card) 26'; Jorginho (yellow card) 35'; Glazer (yellow card) 56'; Satpayev 59'; Bagdat (yellow card) 82'	Stadium: Stožice Stadium; Attendance: 4,877; Referee: Christos Vergetis (Greece)

15 July 2025 First qualifying round 2nd leg	Kairat (Kazakhstan)	2–0 (3–1 agg.)	(Slovenia) Olimpija Ljubljana	Almaty, Kahzhkstan
20:00 (UTC+5)	Jorginho 5'; Edmilson (yellow card) 10'; Mrynskiy 31'; Sorokin (yellow card) 60'; Zaria (yellow card) 72'; Glazer (yellow card) 76'	Report	Kojić (yellow card) 45+1'	Stadium: Central Stadium; Attendance: 22,800; Referee: Matteo Marchetti (Italy)

22 July 2025 Second qualifying round 1st leg	KuPS (Finland)	2–0	(Kazakhstan) Kairat	Kuopio, Finland
20:00 (UTC+5)	Oksanen (yellow card) 12' (goal) 71'; Toure 49'	Report	Glazer (yellow card) 84'	Stadium: Kuopio Football Stadium; Attendance: 2,912; Referee: Alejandro Muñiz Ruiz (Spain)

29 July 2025 Second qualifying round 2nd leg	Kairat (Kazakhstan)	3–0 (3–2 agg.)	(Finland) KuPS	Almaty, Kahzhkstan
20:00 (UTC+5)	Jorginho (yellow card) 7' (goal) 29'; Satpayev 9'; Gromyko 43' (yellow card) 72'; Zaria (red card) 45+1'; Arad (yellow card) 50'; Zarutskiy (yellow card) 90+6'; Mrynskiy (yellow card) 90+7'	Report	Arifi (yellow card) 45'	Stadium: Central Stadium; Attendance: 22,800; Referee: Radoslav Gidzhenov (Bulgaria)

6 August 2025 Third qualifying round 1st leg	Kairat (Kazakhstan)	1–0	(Slovakia) Slovan Bratislava	Almaty, Kazakhstan
20:00 (UTC+5)	Tapalov (yellow card) 25'; Kasabulat (yellow card) 55'; Satpayev (yellow card) 67' (goal) 90' (pen.)	Report	Barseghyan (yellow card) 15'; Ibrahim (yellow card) 51' (yellow-red card) 65'; Strelec (yellow card) 72'; Ihnatenko (yellow card) 88'; Bajrić (yellow card) 90+2'	Stadium: Central Stadium; Attendance: 22,800; Referee: Serdar Gözübüyük (Netherlands)

12 August 2025 Third qualifying round 2nd leg	Slovan Bratislava (Slovakia)	1–0 (a.e.t.) (1–1 agg.) (3–4 p)	(Kazakhstan) Kairat	Bratislava, Slovakia
23:15 (UTC+5)	Mak 30' (yellow card) 74'; Weiss (yellow card) 49'; Tolić (yellow card) 59'; Blackman (yellow card) 60'; Bajrić (yellow card) 82'; Wimmer (yellow card) 90+5'; Marcelli (yellow card) 97'	Report	Satpayev (yellow card) 61'; Gromyko (yellow card) 90+1'; Zaria (yellow card) 100'; Mrynskiy (yellow card) 108'	Stadium: Tehelné pole Attendance: 21,005; Referee: Benoît Bastien
	Penalties
	Tolić (penalty scored); Pokorný (penalty scored); Kukharevych (penalty scored); Mustafić (penalty missed); Barseghyan (penalty missed)		(penalty missed) Gromyko; (penalty scored) Martynovich; (penalty scored) Ricardinho; (penalty scored) Sorokin; (penalty scored) Jorginho

21 August 2025 Playoff round 1st leg	Celtic (Scotland)	0–0	(Kazakhstan) Kairat	Glasgow, Scotland
00:00 (UTC+5)	McGregor (yellow card) 26'; Tierney (yellow card) 31'	Report	Martynovich (yellow card) 6'; Glazer (yellow card) 31'; Satpayev (yellow card) 90+10'	Stadium: Celtic Park; Attendance: 56,182; Referee: Espen Eskås (Norway)

26 August 2025 Playoff round 2nd leg	Kairat (Kazakhstan)	0–0 (a.e.t.) (0–0 agg.) (3–2 p)	(Scotland) Celtic	Almaty, Kazakhstan
21:45 (UTC+5)		Report	Hatate (yellow card) 101'	Stadium: Central Stadium; Attendance: 22,800; Referee: Maurizio Mariani (Italy)
	Penalties
	Gromyko (penalty missed); Martynovich (penalty scored); Arad (penalty scored); Sorokin (penalty scored)		(penalty missed) Idah; (penalty missed) McCowan; (penalty scored) Engels; (penalty scored) McGregor; (penalty missed) Maeda

==== League Phase ====
Pos	Team	Pld	W	D	L	GF	GA	GD	Pts
32	(Royal Dutch Football Association) Ajax	8	2	0	6	8	21	−13	6
33	(German Football Association) Eintracht Frankfurt	8	1	1	6	10	21	−11	4
34	(Football Association of the Czech Republic) Slavia Prague	8	0	3	5	5	19	−14	3
35	(Royal Spanish Football Federation) Villarreal	8	0	1	7	5	18	−13	1
36	(Kazakhstan Football Federation) Kairat	8	0	1	7	7	22	−15	1

Source: UEFA
Rules for classification: League phase tiebreakers

19 September 2025 1	Sporting CP (Portugal)	4–1	(Kazakhstan) Kairat	Lisbon, Portugal
00:00 (UTC+5)	Kochorashvili (yellow card) 4'; Suárez (yellow card) 31'; Trincão 44', 65'; Alisson 67'; Quenda 68'	Report	Jorginho (yellow card) 39'; Edmilson 86'; Satpayev (yellow card) 90+3'	Stadium: Estádio José Alvalade; Attendance: 38,696; Referee: Damian Sylwestrzak (Poland)

30 September 2025 2	Kairat (Kazakhstan)	0–5	(Spain) Real Madrid	Almaty, Kazakhstan
21:45 (UTC+5)	Gromyko (yellow card) 48'; Arad (yellow card) 55'	Report	Mbappé 25' (pen.), 52', 73'; Camavinga 83'; Brahim 90+3'	Stadium: Central Stadium; Attendance: 22,788; Referee: Marco Guida (Italy)

21 October 2025 3	Kairat (Kazakhstan)	0–0	(Cyprus) Pafos	Almaty, Kazhkstan
21:45 (UTC+5)	Satpayev (yellow card) 21'; Arad (yellow card) 40'; Tuyakbaev (yellow card) 82'	Report	Correia (red card) 4'; Šunjić (yellow card) 80'	Stadium: Central Stadium; Attendance: 16,478; Referee: Chris Kavanagh (England)

6 November 2025 4	Inter Milan (Italy)	2–1	(Kazakhstan) Kairat	Milan, Italy
01:00 (UTC+5)	L.Martínez 45'; Barella (yellow card) 58'; Augusto 67'	Report	Jorginho (yellow card) 6'; Arad 55'	Stadium: San Siro; Attendance: 69,983; Referee: Luis Godinho (Portugal)

26 November 2025 5	Copenhagen (Denmark)	3–2	(Kazakhstan) Kairat	Copenhagen, Denmark
23:45 (UTC+5)	Daðason 26'; Hatzidiakos (yellow card) 56'; Larsson 59' (pen.); Robert 73'; Lerager (yellow card) 90+2'	Report	Satpayev 81' (yellow card) 90+4'; Mrynskiy (yellow card) 87'; Baybek 90'; Tapalov (yellow card) 90+3'; Ricardinho (yellow card) 90+3'	Stadium: Parken Stadium; Attendance: 30,231; Referee: Nick Walsh (Scotland)

9 December 2025 6	Kairat (Kazakhstan)	0–1	(Greece) Olympiacos	Astana, Kazakhstan
20:30 (UTC+5)	Tuyakbayev (yellow card) 70'	Report	Hezze (yellow card) 14'; Bancone (yellow card) 35'; Martins 73'	Stadium: Astana Arena; Attendance: 19,463; Referee: Juan Martínez Munuera (Spain)
Note: Match played at the Astana Arena in Astana instead of Kairat's regular Central Stadium in Almaty.

Matche 7 against Club Brugge and match 8 against Arsenal took place during the 2026 season.

== Squad statistics ==
As of match played 9 December 2025

=== Appearances and goals ===
No.	Pos	Nat	Player	Total		Premier League		Kazakhstan Cup		Super Cup		UEFA Champions League	
No.	Pos	Nat	Player	Apps	Goals	Apps	Goals	Apps	Goals	Apps	Goals	Apps	Goals
1	GK	(Kazakhstan) KAZ	Aleksandr Zarutskiy	21	0	11+1	0	1	0	1	0	7	0
3	DF	(Portugal) POR	Luís Mata	36	0	22	0	2	0	0	0	12	0
4	DF	(Kazakhstan) KAZ	Damir Kasabulat	39	0	14+9	0	0+2	0	0+1	0	9+4	0
5	DF	(Kazakhstan) KAZ	Lev Kurgin	9	0	5+2	0	0+1	0	0	0	0+1	0
6	MF	(Kazakhstan) KAZ	Adilet Sadybekov	19	0	5+7	0	0+1	0	0	0	0+6	0
7	FW	(Portugal) POR	Jorginho	43	12	21+5	10	2	0	0+1	0	13+1	2
9	FW	(Kazakhstan) KAZ	Dastan Satpayev	41	19	20+6	14	1+1	1	0+1	0	11+1	4
10	MF	(Georgia (country)) GEO	Giorgi Zaria	29	7	13+5	5	2	2	1	0	1+7	0
11	FW	(Brazil) BRA	João Paulo	5	1	3+1	1	0	0	1	0	0	0
14	DF	(Belarus) BLR	Alyaksandr Martynovich	34	3	19+1	3	2	0	1	0	11	0
15	MF	(Israel) ISR	Ofri Arad	36	1	21+2	0	2	0	1	0	9+1	1
17	FW	(Kazakhstan) KAZ	Olzhas Baybek	18	1	4+8	0	1	0	0	0	1+4	1
18	MF	(Israel) ISR	Dan Glazer	27	0	13+2	0	1	0	1	0	9+1	0
19	FW	(Brazil) BRA	Élder Santana	2	1	1	0	0	0	1	1	0	0
20	DF	(Kazakhstan) KAZ	Yerkin Tapalov	33	1	13+4	1	1	0	1	0	13+1	0
24	DF	(Kazakhstan) KAZ	Aleksandr Mrynskiy	31	1	9+7	0	1	0	0	0	10+4	1
25	DF	(Kazakhstan) KAZ	Aleksandr Shirobokov	16	0	9+2	0	1	0	0	0	3+1	0
26	FW	(Brazil) BRA	Edmilson	20	5	4+4	4	0	0	0	0	9+3	1
33	MF	(Serbia) SRB	Jug Stanojev	33	3	13+9	3	0+2	0	1	0	1+7	0
55	MF	(Belarus) BLR	Valery Gromyko	41	6	23+1	4	2	0	1	1	12+2	1
59	DF	(Kazakhstan) KAZ	Daniyar Tashpulatov	4	0	2+2	0	0	0	0	0	0	0
77	GK	(Kazakhstan) KAZ	Temirlan Anarbekov	17	0	10	0	1	0	0	0	5+1	0
80	DF	(Russia) RUS	Yegor Sorokin	39	1	22	1	1+1	0	1	0	14	0
81	FW	(Kazakhstan) KAZ	Ismail Bekbolat	9	0	0+8	0	1	0	0	0	0	0
82	GK	(Kazakhstan) KAZ	Sherkhan Kalmurza	5	0	2+1	0	0	0	0	0	2	0
87	FW	(Kazakhstan) KAZ	Azamat Tuyakbaev	5	1	0+3	1	0	0	0	0	0+2	0
89	FW	(Kazakhstan) KAZ	Ramazan Bagdat	17	3	2+11	3	0+1	0	0	0	0+3	0
99	FW	(Brazil) BRA	Ricardinho	22	2	3+6	2	0	0	0	0	2+11	0
Players away from Kairat on loan:
Players who left Kairat during the season:
44	DF	(Georgia (country)) GEO	Luka Gadrani	3	0	2+1	0	0	0	0	0	0	0

=== Goal scorers ===
Place	Position	Nation	Number	Name	Premier League	Kazakhstan Cup	Super Cup	UEFA Champions League	Total
1	FW	(Kazakhstan)	9	Dastan Satpayev	14	1	0	4	19
2	FW	(Portugal)	7	Jorginho	10	0	0	2	12
3	MF	(Georgia (country))	10	Giorgi Zaria	5	2	0	0	7
4	MF	(Belarus)	55	Valery Gromyko	4	0	1	1	6
5	FW	(Brazil)	26	Edmilson	4	0	0	1	5
6	DF	(Belarus)	14	Alyaksandr Martynovich	3	0	0	0	3
6	MF	(Serbia)	33	Jug Stanojev	3	0	0	0	3
6	FW	(Kazakhstan)	89	Ramazan Bagdat	3	0	0	0	3
9	FW	(Brazil)	99	Ricardinho	2	0	0	0	2
10	FW	(Brazil)	11	João Paulo	1	0	0	0	1
10	DF	(Kazakhstan)	20	Yerkin Tapalov	1	0	0	0	1
10	DF	(Russia)	80	Yegor Sorokin	1	0	0	0	1
10	FW	(Kazakhstan)	87	Azamat Tuyakbaev	1	0	0	0	1
10	FW	(Brazil)	19	Élder Santana	0	0	1	0	1
10	DF	(Kazakhstan)	24	Aleksandr Mrynskiy	0	0	0	1	1
10	MF	(Israel)	15	Ofri Arad	0	0	0	1	1
10	FW	(Kazakhstan)	17	Olzhas Baybek	0	0	0	1	1
10				Own goal	1	0	0	0	1
				TOTALS	53	3	2	11	69

=== Clean sheets ===
Place	Position	Nation	Number	Name	Premier League	Kazakhstan Cup	Super Cup	UEFA Champions League	Total
1	GK	(Kazakhstan)	77	Temirlan Anarbekov	6	1	0	3	10
2	GK	(Kazakhstan)	1	Aleksandr Zarutskiy	4	0	1	4	9
3	GK	(Kazakhstan)	82	Sherkhan Kalmurza	2	0	0	0	2
				TOTALS	10	1	1	5	17

Aleksandr Zarutskiy & Temirlan Anarbekov both played in Kairat's 0-0 draw against Celtic on 21 August 2025
Temirlan Anarbekov & Sherkhan Kalmurza both played in Kairat's 1-0 draw win over Aktobe on 14 September 2025

=== Disciplinary record ===
Number	Nation	Position	Name	Premier League		Kazakhstan Cup		Super Cup		UEFA Champions League		Total	
Number	Nation	Position	Name	Booked	Sent off (straight red)	Booked	Sent off (straight red)	Booked	Sent off (straight red)	Booked	Sent off (straight red)	Booked	Sent off (straight red)
1	(Kazakhstan)	GK	Aleksandr Zarutskiy	3	0	0	0	0	0	1	0	4	0
3	(Portugal)	DF	Luís Mata	3	0	0	0	0	0	0	0	3	0
4	(Kazakhstan)	DF	Damir Kasabulat	6	0	0	0	0	0	1	0	7	0
6	(Kazakhstan)	MF	Adilet Sadybekov	1	0	0	0	0	0	0	0	1	0
7	(Portugal)	FW	Jorginho	3	0	0	0	0	0	4	0	7	0
9	(Kazakhstan)	FW	Dastan Satpayev	2	0	0	0	0	0	6	0	8	0
10	(Georgia (country))	MF	Giorgi Zaria	2	0	0	0	0	0	2	1	4	1
14	(Belarus)	DF	Alyaksandr Martynovich	2	0	0	0	0	0	1	0	3	0
15	(Israel)	MF	Ofri Arad	3	0	0	0	0	0	3	0	6	0
18	(Israel)	MF	Dan Glazer	5	1	0	0	0	0	4	0	9	1
20	(Kazakhstan)	DF	Yerkin Tapalov	1	1	0	0	2	1	2	0	5	2
24	(Kazakhstan)	DF	Aleksandr Mrynskiy	2	0	0	0	0	0	3	0	5	0
25	(Kazakhstan)	DF	Aleksandr Shirobokov	2	1	0	0	0	0	0	0	2	1
26	(Brazil)	FW	Edmilson	1	1	0	0	0	0	1	0	2	1
33	(Serbia)	MF	Jug Stanojev	1	0	0	0	0	0	0	0	1	0
55	(Belarus)	MF	Valery Gromyko	7	1	1	0	1	0	4	0	13	1
59	(Kazakhstan)	DF	Daniyar Tashpulatov	1	0	0	0	0	0	0	0	1	0
77	(Kazakhstan)	GK	Temirlan Anarbekov	0	1	0	0	0	0	0	0	0	1
80	(Russia)	DF	Yegor Sorokin	3	0	0	0	0	0	1	0	4	0
87	(Kazakhstan)	FW	Azamat Tuyakbaev	0	0	0	0	0	0	2	0	2	0
89	(Kazakhstan)	FW	Ramazan Bagdat	2	1	0	0	0	0	1	0	3	1
99	(Brazil)	FW	Ricardinho	1	0	0	0	0	0	1	0	2	0
Players away on loan:
Players who left Kairat during the season:
			TOTALS	51	7	1	0	3	1	37	1	92	9
