= 2024 FC Kairat season =

FC Kairat
2024 season
- Chairman: Kairat Boranbayev
- Manager: Kirill Keker (until 29 April); Rafael Urazbakhtin (Caretaker) (29 April - 29 May); Aleksandr Kerzhakov (29 May - 3 September); Rafael Urazbakhtin (from 6 September)
- Stadium: Central Stadium
- Premier League: 1st (champions)
- Kazakhstan Cup: Quarter-finals vs Atyrau
- Kazakhstan League Cup: Semi-finals vs Zhenis
- Top goalscorer: League: João Paulo (10); All: João Paulo (14)
- Highest home attendance: 22,804 vs Aktobe (20 April 2024)
- Lowest home attendance: 3,493 vs Akzhayik (26 May 2024)
- Average home league attendance: 10,134 (2 November 2024)
Home colours	Away colours	Third colours

The 2024 FC Kairat season was the 14th successive season that the club played in the Kazakhstan Premier League, the highest tier of association football in Kazakhstan, since their promotion back to the top flight in 2009.

== Season events ==
At the end of the previous season, Kairat announced that they had signed Ofri Arad permanently from Maccabi Haifa, and Luka Gadrani and Élder Santana both from Aktobe.

On 15 January, Kairat announced the year-long loan signing of Ibrokhimkhalil Yuldoshev from Pari Nizhny Novgorod.

On 29 April, Head Coach Kirill Keker resigned from his position with Kairat 8th in the league, with Rafael Urazbakhtin being placed in temporary charge.

On 29 May, Aleksandr Kerzhakov was appointed as Kairats new Head Coach.

On 18 June, Kairat announced the signing of Alyaksandr Martynovich from Rubin Kazan on a contract until the end of the 2025 season.

On 4 July, Kairat announced the signing of Valery Gromyko from Kaisar on a contract until the end of the 2025 season.

On 5 July, Kairat announced the signing of Jug Stanojev from Spartak Subotica to a three-year contract.

On 19 July, Kairat announced that Viktor Vasin had left the club by mutual agreement.

On 22 July, Kairat announced the signing of free-agent Yegor Sorokin on a contract until the end of the 2025 season.

On 3 September, Kairat announced that Aleksandr Kerzhakov had left his role as Head Coach by mutual agreement, with Rafael Urazbakhtin being appointed as his replacement on a contract until the end of the season on 6 September.

== Squad ==
As of match played 10 November 2024

No.	Name	Nationality	Position	Date of birth (age)	Signed from	Signed in	Contract ends	Apps.	Goals
Goalkeepers
1	Danil Ustimenko	(Kazakhstan)	GK	8 August 2000 (aged 24)	Youth Team	2019	2024	74	0
27	Temirlan Anarbekov	(Kazakhstan)	GK	14 October 2003 (aged 21)	Youth Team	2020		5	0
30	Vadim Ulyanov	(Russia)	GK	7 October 2001 (aged 23)	Kairat Moscow	2022		42	0
Defenders
3	Ibrokhimkhalil Yuldoshev	(Uzbekistan)	DF	14 February 2001 (aged 23)	on loan from Pari Nizhny Novgorod	2024	2024	23	2
4	Damir Kasabulat	(Kazakhstan)	DF	29 August 2002 (aged 22)	Kairat Moscow	2022	2025	82	0
13	Lev Kurgin	(Kazakhstan)	DF	6 June 2002 (aged 22)	Kairat Moscow	2022		47	0
14	Alyaksandr Martynovich	(Belarus)	DF	26 August 1987 (aged 37)	Rubin Kazan	2024	2025	17	2
15	Ofri Arad	(Israel)	DF	11 September 1998 (aged 26)	Maccabi Haifa	2024		56	2
24	Aleksandr Mrynskiy	(Kazakhstan)	DF	15 July 2004 (aged 20)	Academy	2022		20	0
29	Sultan Askarov	(Kazakhstan)	DF	21 January 2004 (aged 20)	Academy	2024		0	0
44	Luka Gadrani	(Georgia (country))	DF	12 April 1997 (aged 27)	Aktobe	2024		18	2
80	Yegor Sorokin	(Russia)	DF	4 November 1995 (aged 29)	Unattached	2024	2025	13	1
Midfielders
6	Adilet Sadybekov	(Kazakhstan)	MF	26 May 2002 (aged 22)	Academy	2021	2025	68	7
7	Giorgi Zaria	(Georgia (country))	MF	14 July 1997 (aged 27)	Dinamo Batumi	2024		30	8
20	Dmitry Sergeyev	(Russia)	MF	3 April 2000 (aged 24)	Zenit St.Petersburg	2023		52	6
21	Arsen Buranchiev	(Kazakhstan)	MF	12 September 2001 (aged 23)	Academy	2020	2024	66	1
22	Yerkebulan Seydakhmet	(Kazakhstan)	MF	4 February 2000 (aged 24)	Ufa	2019		105	8
23	Andrey Ulshin	(Kazakhstan)	MF	18 April 2000 (aged 24)	Academy	2020		80	9
26	Miras Omatay	(Kazakhstan)	MF	15 July 2004 (aged 20)	Academy	2021		2	0
33	Jug Stanojev	(Serbia)	MF	29 July 1999 (aged 25)	Academy	2024	2027	14	0
55	Valery Gromyko	(Belarus)	MF	23 January 1997 (aged 27)	Kaisar	2024	2025	14	1
96	Olzhas Baybek	(Kazakhstan)	MF	11 February 2005 (aged 19)	Academy	2024		3	1
Forwards
9	Vyacheslav Shvyryov	(Kazakhstan)	FW	7 January 2001 (aged 23)	Academy	2018	2024	113	14
11	João Paulo	(Brazil)	FW	2 June 1988 (aged 36)	Ordabasy	2021	2024	106	46
17	Saif Popov	(Kazakhstan)	FW	30 June 2004 (aged 20)	Academy	2021		7	0
19	Élder Santana	(Brazil)	FW	7 April 1993 (aged 30)	Aktobe	2024		29	4
76	Dastan Satpayev	(Kazakhstan)	FW	12 August 2008 (aged 16)	Academy	2024		1	0
Players away on loan
2	Egor Tkachenko	(Kazakhstan)	DF	14 April 2003 (aged 21)	Kairat Moscow	2022		39	0
18	Yan Trufanov	(Kazakhstan)	FW	17 May 2004 (aged 20)	Academy	2022		20	4
25	Aleksandr Shirobokov	(Kazakhstan)	DF	2 January 2003 (aged 21)	Academy	2020		28	1
	Nikita Pivkin	(Kazakhstan)	GK	24 March 2003 (aged 21)	Academy	2022		0	0
Players that left during the season
5	Viktor Vasin	(Russia)	DF	6 October 1988 (aged 36)	CSKA Moscow	2022		68	4

== Transfers ==
=== In ===
Date	Position	Nationality	Name	From	Fee	Ref.
15 November 2023	DF	(Georgia (country))	Luka Gadrani	Aktobe	Undisclosed	
16 November 2023	FW	(Brazil)	Élder Santana	Aktobe	Undisclosed	
29 November 2023	DF	(Israel)	Ofri Arad	Maccabi Haifa	Undisclosed	
1 January 2024	MF	(Georgia (country))	Giorgi Zaria	Dinamo Batumi	Undisclosed	
18 June 2024	DF	(Belarus)	Alyaksandr Martynovich	Rubin Kazan	Free	
4 July 2024	MF	(Belarus)	Valery Gromyko	Kaisar	Undisclosed	
5 July 2024	MF	(Serbia)	Jug Stanojev	Spartak Subotica	Undisclosed	
22 July 2024	DF	(Russia)	Yegor Sorokin	Unattached	Free	

=== Loans in ===
Date from	Position	Nationality	Name	To	Date to	Ref.
15 January 2024	DF	(Uzbekistan)	Ibrokhimkhalil Yuldoshev	Pari Nizhny Novgorod	End of season	

=== Out ===
Date	Position	Nationality	Name	To	Fee	Ref.
10 January 2024	MF	(Russia)	Anton Krachkovsky	Dynamo Makhachkala	Undisclosed	
23 January 2024	MF	(Kazakhstan)	Alen Aymanov	Yelimay	Undisclosed	
6 February 2024	FW	(Kazakhstan)	Artur Shushenachev	Hapoel Be'er Sheva	Undisclosed	

=== Loans out ===
Date from	Position	Nationality	Name	To	Date to	Ref.
10 July 2024	FW	(Kazakhstan)	Yan Trufanov	Zhenis	End of season	
25 July 2024	DF	(Kazakhstan)	Aleksandr Shirobokov	Slavia Mozyr	End of season	
28 July 2024	DF	(Kazakhstan)	Egor Tkachenko	Zhetysu	End of season	

=== Released ===
Date	Position	Nationality	Name	Joined	Date	Ref.
15 January 2024	DF	(Kazakhstan)	Mikael Askarov	Smorgon		
19 July 2024	DF	(Russia)	Viktor Vasin			
27 November 2024	MF	(Kazakhstan)	Arsen Buranchiev	Kyzylzhar	12 December 2024	
27 November 2024	MF	(Kazakhstan)	Andrey Ulshin	Kyzylzhar	25 December 2024	
27 November 2024	MF	(Russia)	Dmitry Sergeyev	Arsenal Tula	13 January 2025	
27 November 2024	FW	(Kazakhstan)	Vyacheslav Shvyryov	Ordabasy	10 January 2025	
28 November 2024	GK	(Kazakhstan)	Danil Ustimenko	Tobol	1 January 2025	
31 December 2024	DF	(Kazakhstan)	Sultan Askarov			
31 December 2024	MF	(Kazakhstan)	Miras Omatay			
31 December 2024	FW	(Kazakhstan)	Yan Trufanov			

== Friendlies ==
4 February 2024	Lokomotiv Moscow	4–1	Kairat	Abu Dhabi
17:00 (UTC+5)	Pinyayev 12'; Mitaj 22'; Suleymanov 36'; Sarveli 87'	Report	Shvyryov 41'	Stadium: Zayed Sports City Stadium

6 February 2024	Shabab Al Ahli Club	2–0	Kairat	Abu Dhabi
20:30 (UTC+5)	Igor Jesus 13', 53'	Report

11 February 2024	Kairat	2–1	Rostov	Abu Dhabi
21:00 (UTC+5)	Paulo 30'; Zaria 64'	Report	Komlichenko 90+5'	Stadium: Al Nahyan Stadium

14 February 2024	Spartak Moscow	6–0	Kairat	Abu Dhabi
20:30 (UTC+5)	Sobolev 8'; Zinkovsky 14'; Khlusevich 55'; Promes 62', 82'; Moses 85'	Report		Stadium: Al Nahyan Stadium

8 February 2024	Kairat	3–4	Zenit St.Petersburg	Almaty
19:00 (UTC+5)	Shvyryov (yellow card) 19' (goal) 90+2'; Artur 54' (o.g.); Sorokin (yellow card) 61'; Paulo (yellow card) 65'; Stanojev 66'	Report	Yerokhin 37'; Cassierra 51'; Gondou 73', 78' (yellow card) 83'	Stadium: Central Stadium

== Competitions ==
=== Overview ===
Competition	First match	Last match	Starting round	Final position	Record							
Competition	First match	Last match	Starting round	Final position	Pld	W	D	L	GF	GA	GD	Win %
Premier League	2 March 2024	10 November 2024	Matchday 1	Winners	24	14	5	5	39	21	+18	58.33
Kazakhstan Cup	13 April 2024	8 May 2024	Round of 16	Quarterfinal	2	1	0	1	4	3	+1	50.00
League Cup	26 May 2024	25 September 2024	Group stage	Semifinal	5	3	1	1	15	3	+12	60.00
Total					31	18	6	7	58	27	+31	58.06

Last updated: 10 November 2024
Source: Competitions

=== Premier League ===
==== Results summary ====
Overall								Home						Away					
Pld	W	D	L	GF	GA	GD	Pts	W	D	L	GF	GA	GD	W	D	L	GF	GA	GD
24	14	5	5	39	21	+18	47	7	3	2	23	13	+10	7	2	3	16	8	+8

Last updated: 10 November 2024.
Source: See Results

==== Results by round ====
Round	1	2	3	4	5	6	7	8	9	10	11	12^{1}	13	14	15	16	17	18	19	20^{1}	21	22	23	24	25	26
Ground	H	A	A	H	H	A	H	A	A	H	A	H	A	H	A	H	A	H	H	A	H	A	H	A	H	A
Result	W	D	W	D	L	L	W	W	D	W	L	P	W	D	W	W	W	D	L	P	W	L	W	W	W	W
Position	5	4	2	1	5	8	5	3	3	3	3	3	3	3	3	2	1	1	1	4	2	4	2	1	1	1

Source: See Results
A = Away; H = Home; W = Win; D = Draw; L = Loss; P = Bye
Notes:
- ^{1} Kairat had a bye during the twelfth and twentieth round of fixtures.

==== Results ====
2 March 2024 1	Kairat	2–1	Kyzylzhar	Almaty
14:00 (UTC+6)	João Paulo 41'; Sadybekov (yellow card) 43'; Gadrani (yellow card) 50'; Arad (yellow card) 56'; Zaria 71'; Ustimenko (yellow card) 81'	Report	Muldinov (yellow card) 28' (goal) 63'; Cmiljanić (yellow card) 50'; Sabino (yellow card) 77'	Stadium: Central Stadium; Attendance: 5,347; Referee: Alexander Zatula

7 March 2024 2	Turan	0–0	Kairat	Turkistan
17:00 (UTC+5)	Vaca (yellow card) 63'; Cuckić (yellow card) 73'; Sokolenko (yellow card) 63'; (yellow card) 90+5'	Report	Shirobokov (yellow card) 5'; Yuldoshev (yellow card) 18'	Stadium: Turkistan Arena; Referee: Danil Gorda

31 March 2024 3	Ordabasy	1–2	Kairat	Shymkent
19:00 (UTC+5)	Yerlanov (yellow card) 58'; Cvek (yellow card) 66'; Yakhshiboev 85'	Report	Plastun 42' (o.g.); João Paulo (yellow card) 56' (goal) 68'; Shvyryov (yellow card) 63'	Stadium: Kazhymukan Munaitpasov Stadium; Attendance: 8,700; Referee: Daniyar Sakhi

6 April 2024 4	Kairat	0–0	Zhetysu	Almaty
19:00 (UTC+5)	Kasabulat (yellow card) 39'	Report	Chikanchi (yellow card) 3'; Mosiashvili (yellow card) 39'; Chaduneli (yellow card) 70'	Stadium: Central Stadium; Attendance: 8,357; Referee: Bulat Sariev

20 April 2024 5	Kairat	1–3	Aktobe	Almaty
19:00 (UTC+5)	Gadrani (yellow card) 16'; Arad (yellow card) 45'; Seydakhmet (yellow card) 89'; Shvyryov 90+6'	Report	Kasym 40' (pen.); Baytana (yellow card) 45'; Umayev (yellow card) 45'; Samorodov (yellow card) 61' (goal) 68', 90+2'	Stadium: Central Stadium; Attendance: 22,804; Referee: Daniyar Sakhi

27 April 2024 6	Kaisar	1–0	Kairat	Kyzylorda
19:00 (UTC+5)	Milojko (yellow card) 23'; Narzildayev (yellow card) 35'; Kenesbek (yellow card) 37'; Makhan (yellow card) 77'; Baradzin (yellow card) 81'; Zhaksylykov 90+4'	Report	Santana (yellow card) 9'; Kurgin (yellow card) 31'; Gadrani (yellow card) 39'; Sadybekov (yellow card) 52'; Vasin (yellow card) 59'; Seydakhmet (yellow card) 90+5'	Stadium: Gani Muratbayev Stadium; Attendance: 4,450; Referee: Ruslan Sultangaliev

4 May 2024 7	Kairat	1–0	Atyrau	Almaty
16:30 (UTC+5)	Kasabulat (yellow card) 5'; Sadybekov (yellow card) 23'; Zaria (yellow card) 48'; Seydakhmet 51'; Buranchiev (yellow card) 90+7'	Report	Olimzoda (yellow card) 43'; Barbosa (red card) 83'	Stadium: Central Stadium; Attendance: 6,589; Referee: Denis Izmailov

12 May 2024 8	Zhenis	0–2	Kairat	Astana
19:00 (UTC+5)	Tevzadze (yellow card) 2'; Grechikho (yellow card) 42'; Sovet (yellow card) 60'; Volkov (yellow card) 75'; Jakobsen (yellow card) 90+3'	Report	Vasin (yellow card) 18'; Buranchiev (yellow card) 24' (red card) 58'; Sadybekov 66'; Shvyryov (yellow card) 83' (goal) 90+4'	Stadium: Kazhymukan Munaitpasov Stadium; Attendance: 500; Referee: Sergey Nozhenko

19 May 2024 9	Elimai	1–1	Kairat	Semey
21:00 (UTC+5)	Korzun (yellow card) 12'; David (yellow card) 68'; Pertsukh 90+5'	Report	Zaria (yellow card) 35'; João Paulo 55' (yellow card) 58'; Arad (yellow card) 79'; Shvyryov (yellow card) 90+1'	Stadium: Spartak Stadium; Attendance: 8,000; Referee: Bulat Sariev

2 June 2024 10	Kairat	4–2	Shakhter Karagandy	Almaty
19:00 (UTC+5)	Sadybekov 22'; Yuldoshev 25' (yellow card) 71'; Seydakhmet (yellow card) 38'; Arad (yellow card) 72'; Zaria 77' (pen.); Santana 81'; Shvyryov (yellow card) 90+3'	Report	Ashortia 35', 65'; Tyulyubay (yellow card) 48'; Cañas (yellow card) 69'; Stamenković (yellow card) 78'	Stadium: Central Stadium; Attendance: 10,159; Referee: Alexander Zatula

15 June 2024 11	Tobol	1–0	Kairat	Kostanay
19:00 (UTC+5)	Ivanović 31'; Pokatilov (yellow card) 90+5'	Report	Vasin (yellow card) 35'	Stadium: Central Stadium; Attendance: 5,000; Referee: Daniyar Sakhi

12	Kairat	BYE	Aksu	Almaty
(UTC+5)				Stadium: Central Stadium

29 June 2024 13	Astana	1–3	Kairat	Almaty
20:00 (UTC+5)	Osei (yellow card) 24'; Kažukolovas 28'; Astanov (penalty missed) 50'; Amanović (yellow card) 66'; Ebong (yellow card) 74'; Karimov (yellow card) 90'; Kuat (yellow card) 90+7'	Report	Martynovich (yellow card) 2'; Yuldoshev (yellow card) 27'; João Paulo 29'; Seydakhmet (yellow card) 58'; Sadybekov 67'; Sergeyev 90+5'	Stadium: Khan Taniri Stadium; Attendance: 3,000; Referee: Bulat Sariev

14 July 2024 14	Kairat	1–1	Zhenis	Almaty
18:00 (UTC+5)	João Paulo 49'; Santana (yellow card) 88'	Report	Tevzadze (yellow card) 9'; Budínský 83'	Stadium: Central Stadium; Attendance: 6,874; Referee: Daniyar Sakhi

27 July 2024 15	Shakhter Karagandy	0–3	Kairat	Karaganda
18:00 (UTC+5)	Tyulyubay (yellow card) 15'; Kybyray (yellow card) 48'	Report	Zaria 30' (yellow card) 36'; João Paulo 49'; Sorokin (yellow card) 83'; Shvyryov 90+7'	Stadium: Shakhter Stadium; Attendance: 7,000; Referee: Aydin Tasybaev

3 August 2024 16	Kairat	4–1	Elimai	Almaty
20:00 (UTC+5)	Martynovich 3'; Gadrani 14'; Zaria (yellow card) 32'; Ulshin 51' (yellow card) 90+2'; Sorokin 65'; Santana (yellow card) 70'; Arad (yellow card) 83'	Report	Shomko (yellow card) 53'; Payruz 80'; Darabayev (yellow card) 81'	Stadium: Central Stadium; Attendance: 11,239; Referee: Denis Tevyashov

17 August 2024 17	Kyzylzhar	0–1	Kairat	Petropavl
18:00 (UTC+5)	Nižić (yellow card) 25' (yellow-red card) 90+1'; Sabino (yellow card) 41'	Report	Yuldoshev (yellow card) 34'; Ulshin 40'; Santana (yellow card) 90+7'	Stadium: Karasai Stadium; Attendance: 2,000; Referee: Bulat Sariev

25 August 2024 18	Kairat	2–2	Tobol	Almaty
18:00 (UTC+5)	João Paulo 20'; Seydakhmet (yellow card) 44'; Ulshin 55' (yellow card) 55'; Gromyko (yellow card) 71'	Report	Chesnokov (yellow card) 42'; El Messaoudi 53' (yellow card) 80'; Henen 73' (yellow card) 89'	Stadium: Central Stadium; Attendance: 11,456; Referee: Sakhi Daniyar

1 September 2024 19	Kairat	0–1	Astana	Almaty
18:00 (UTC+5)	Arad (yellow card) 82'	Report	Tomasov 84'	Stadium: Central Stadium; Attendance: 15,473; Referee: Bagdat Abdullayev

20	Aksu	BYE	Kairat	Pavlodar
(UTC+5)				Stadium: Central Stadium

21 September 2024 21	Kairat	1–0	Kaisar	Almaty
19:00 (UTC+5)	Zaria 86'; Arad (yellow card) 90+3'	Report	Norbekov (yellow card) 79'; Kameni (yellow card) 90+4'	Stadium: Central Stadium; Attendance: 6,030; Referee: Saken Baimbet

4 October 2024 22	Aktobe	2–1	Kairat	Aktobe
16:00 (UTC+5)	Romero (yellow card) 24'; Jean (yellow card) 34'; Umayev (yellow card) 59' (goal) 89'; Góndola (yellow card) 59' (goal) 82'; Kasym (yellow card) 71'; Kairov (yellow card) 90+4'	Report	Gromyko 51'; Yuldoshev (yellow card) 59'; Martynovich (yellow card) 59'; Arad (yellow card) 69'; Zaria (yellow card) 75'; Shvyryov (yellow card) 90+4'	Stadium: Central Stadium; Attendance: 12,400; Referee: Sayat Karabaev

19 October 2024 23	Kairat	5–1	Turan	Almaty
16:00 (UTC+5)	Zaria 18'; Khomukha 29' (o.g.); João Paulo 34', 74', 90+4'	Report	Vaca (yellow card) 46'; Cuckić 86'	Stadium: Central Stadium; Attendance: 4,600; Referee: Denis Tevyashov

26 October 2024 24	Zhetysu	1–2	Kairat	Taldykorgan
14:00 (UTC+5)	Orynbasar (yellow card) 1'; Muzhikov 3'; Dairov (yellow card) 39'; Karaman (yellow card) 51'; Taipi (yellow card) 89'	Report	Martynovich 22'; Arad 90+2'	Stadium: Zhetysu Stadium; Attendance: 2,999; Referee: Georgy Chekhovsky

2 November 2024 25	Kairat	2–1	Ordabasy	Almaty
16:00 (UTC+5)	Santana 42'; Baybek 84'	Report	Astanov (yellow card) 53'; Suyumbayev (yellow card) 60'; Tungyshbayev 75'; Byesyedin (yellow card) 80'	Stadium: Central Stadium; Attendance: 12,675; Referee: Daniyar Sakhi

10 November 2024 26	Atyrau	0–1	Kairat	Atyrau
14:00 (UTC+5)	Stasevich (yellow card) 17'; Kerimzhanov (yellow card) 36'; Takulov (yellow card) 54'; Stepanov (red card) 56'; Adambaev (yellow card) 90+3'	Report	Gromyko (yellow card) 32'; Arad (yellow card) 41'; Zaria 59' (pen.); Ulyanov (yellow card) 90+6'	Stadium: Munaishy Stadium; Attendance: 5,000; Referee: Denis Tevyashov

==== League table ====
Pos	Team	Pld	W	D	L	GF	GA	GD	Pts	Qualification or relegation
1	Kairat (C)	24	14	5	5	39	21	+18	47	Qualification for the Champions League first qualifying round
2	Astana	24	14	4	6	39	19	+20	46	Qualification for the Conference League second qualifying round
3	Aktobe (W)	24	12	7	5	39	26	+13	43	Qualification for the Europa League first qualifying round (Note: Aktobe qualified for the Europa League first qualifying round by winning the 2024 Kazakhstan Cup.)
4	Ordabasy	24	12	6	6	36	24	+12	42	Qualification for the Conference League first qualifying round
5	Tobol	24	11	6	7	33	23	+10	39	

Source: UEFA, Soccerway, QFL
Rules for classification: 1) Points; 2) Goal difference; 3) Matches won; 4) Goals scored; 5) Away goals scored; 6) Head-to-head points; 7) Head-to-head matches won; 8) Head-to-head goal difference; 9) Head-to-head goals scored; 10) Head-to-head away goals scored; 11) Draw.
(C) Champions; (W) Cup winners

=== Kazakhstan Cup ===
13 April 2024 Round of 16	Kairat	3–0	Turan	Almaty
18:00 (UTC+6)	Santana 29'; Gadrani 40'; Arad (yellow card) 67'; Seydakhmet 90+4' (pen.)	Report	Shamshi (yellow card) 14'; Nikolić (yellow card) 32'; Mawutor (yellow card) 54'; Dmitrijev (yellow card) 80'	Stadium: Central Stadium; Attendance: 5,748; Referee: Aydin Tasybaev

8 May 2024 Quarterfinal	Atyrau	3–1	Kairat	Atyrau
18:00 (UTC+6)	Stasevich 10'; Kerimzhanov 13'; Zhumakhanov (red card) 17'; Novak 43'; Kayamba (yellow card) 73'; Adil (yellow card) 90+2'; Olimzoda (yellow card) 90+7'	Report	João Paulo (penalty missed) 18'; Zaria (yellow card) 30'; Seydakhmet (yellow card) 62'; Arad 70'; Shvyryov (yellow card) 90+6'	Stadium: Munaishy Stadium; Attendance: 5,500; Referee: Saken Baimbet

=== League Cup ===
==== Group stage ====
Pos	Team	Pld	W	D	L	GF	GA	GD	Pts	Qualification
1	Kairat	3	2	1	0	13	1	+12	7	Advanced to Semifinals
2	Kyzylzhar	3	1	1	1	4	4	0	4	
3	Taraz	3	1	0	2	3	6	−3	3	
4	Akzhayik	3	1	0	2	3	12	−9	3	

Updated to match(es) played on 21 July 2024. Source:

26 May 2024 1	Kairat	9–0	Akzhayik	Almaty
20:00 (UTC+5)	Shirobokov 13'; Yuldoshev 28'; Shvyryov 33'; João Paulo 38', 43', 74'; Santana 52'; Sadybekov 58' (pen.); Zaria 79'	Report		Stadium: Central Stadium; Attendance: 3,493; Referee: Ruslan Sultangaliev

7 July 2024 2	Kyzylzhar	1–1	Kairat	Petropavl
17:00 (UTC+5)	Imnadze 36'; Brígido (yellow card) 44'; Saulet (yellow card) 55'; Khaseyn (yellow card) 77'; Bogdanovski (yellow card) 81'; Jovančić (yellow card) 83'	Report	Seydakhmet 17'; Gadrani (yellow card) 69'	Stadium: Karasai Stadium; Attendance: 1,500; Referee: Timur Kumashev

21 July 2024 3	Kairat	3–0	Taraz	Almaty
18:00 (UTC+5)	João Paulo 32'; Seydakhmet 45'; Ulshin 73'	Report	Asan (yellow card) 19'; Umirzakov (yellow card) 51'	Stadium: Central Stadium; Attendance: 4,578; Referee: Sayat Sulikanov

==== Knockout stage ====
10 August 2024 Semi-final 1st leg	Zhenis	2–0	Kairat	Karaganda
18:00 (UTC+5)	Belančić 13'; Pantsulaia 22'; Tevzadze (yellow card) 32'; Sovet (yellow card) 36'; Oliveira (red card) 45+3'	Report	Seydakhmet (yellow card) 10'; Gromyko (yellow card) 49'; Arad (yellow card) 55'	Stadium: Shakhter Stadium; Attendance: 600; Referee: Grigory Moskovchenko

25 September 2024 Semi-final 2nd leg	Kairat	2–0 (2–2 agg.) (2–3 p)	Zhenis	Almaty
19:00 (UTC+5)	Zaria 32', 53' (yellow card) 45'; Kasabulat (yellow card) 74'; Shvyryov (yellow card) 113'	Report	Volkov (yellow card) 68'	Stadium: Central Stadium; Attendance: 2,500; Referee: Alexander Zatula
	Penalties
	Zaria (penalty scored); João Paulo (penalty scored); Ulshin (penalty missed); Martynovich (penalty missed); Seydakhmet (penalty missed)		(penalty scored) Tevzadze; (penalty scored) Silva; (penalty scored) Grechikho; (penalty missed) Belančić

== Squad statistics ==
As of match played 10 November 2024

=== Appearances and goals ===
No.	Pos	Nat	Player	Total		Premier League		Kazakhstan Cup		League Cup	
No.	Pos	Nat	Player	Apps	Goals	Apps	Goals	Apps	Goals	Apps	Goals
1	GK	(Kazakhstan) KAZ	Danil Ustimenko	9	0	6	0	0	0	3	0
3	DF	(Uzbekistan) UZB	Ibrokhimkhalil Yuldoshev	23	2	17	1	2	0	3+1	1
4	DF	(Kazakhstan) KAZ	Damir Kasabulat	21	0	9+5	0	2	0	3+2	0
6	MF	(Kazakhstan) KAZ	Adilet Sadybekov	18	4	13	3	2	0	3	1
7	MF	(Georgia (country)) GEO	Giorgi Zaria	30	9	16+7	6	2	0	2+3	3
9	FW	(Kazakhstan) KAZ	Vyacheslav Shvyryov	26	4	2+18	3	0+1	0	1+4	1
11	FW	(Brazil) BRA	João Paulo	31	14	24	10	2	0	5	4
13	DF	(Kazakhstan) KAZ	Lev Kurgin	13	0	6+5	0	0+1	0	0+1	0
14	DF	(Belarus) BLR	Alyaksandr Martynovich	17	2	13	2	0	0	4	0
15	DF	(Israel) ISR	Ofri Arad	29	2	22	1	2	1	5	0
17	FW	(Kazakhstan) KAZ	Saif Popov	1	0	0	0	0	0	0+1	0
19	FW	(Brazil) BRA	Élder Santana	29	4	23	2	2	1	4	1
20	MF	(Russia) RUS	Dmitry Sergeyev	24	1	4+15	1	2	0	0+3	0
21	MF	(Kazakhstan) KAZ	Arsen Buranchiev	10	0	5+3	0	0+2	0	0	0
22	MF	(Kazakhstan) KAZ	Yerkebulan Seydakhmet	25	4	15+3	1	1+1	1	4+1	2
23	MF	(Kazakhstan) KAZ	Andrey Ulshin	19	4	7+6	3	0+1	0	3+2	1
24	DF	(Kazakhstan) KAZ	Alexander Mrynsky	13	0	2+8	0	0+1	0	0+2	0
30	GK	(Russia) RUS	Vadim Ulyanov	22	0	18	0	2	0	2	0
33	MF	(Serbia) SRB	Jug Stanojev	14	0	8+3	0	0	0	3	0
44	DF	(Georgia (country)) GEO	Luka Gadrani	18	2	15	1	1	1	2	0
55	MF	(Belarus) BLR	Valery Gromyko	14	1	11	1	0	0	3	0
76	FW	(Kazakhstan) KAZ	Dastan Satpayev	1	0	0	0	0	0	0+1	0
80	DF	(Russia) RUS	Yegor Sorokin	13	1	11	1	0	0	2	0
96	MF	(Kazakhstan) KAZ	Olzhas Baybek	3	1	1+2	1	0	0	0	0
Players away from Kairat on loan:
2	DF	(Kazakhstan) KAZ	Egor Tkachenko	10	0	3+5	0	2	0	0	0
18	FW	(Kazakhstan) KAZ	Yan Trufanov	7	0	0+5	0	0+2	0	0	0
25	DF	(Kazakhstan) KAZ	Aleksandr Shirobokov	8	1	5+2	0	0	0	1	1
Players who left Kairat during the season:
5	DF	(Russia) RUS	Viktor Vasin	11	0	8	0	0+1	0	2	0

=== Goal scorers ===
Place	Position	Nation	Number	Name	Premier League	Kazakhstan Cup	League Cup	Total
1	FW	(Brazil)	11	João Paulo	10	0	4	14
2	MF	(Georgia (country))	7	Giorgi Zaria	6	0	3	9
3	MF	(Kazakhstan)	6	Adilet Sadybekov	3	0	1	4
3	MF	(Kazakhstan)	22	Yerkebulan Seydakhmet	1	1	2	4
5	FW	(Kazakhstan)	9	Vyacheslav Shvyryov	3	0	1	4
5	MF	(Kazakhstan)	23	Andrey Ulshin	3	0	1	4
5	FW	(Brazil)	19	Élder Santana	2	1	1	4
8	DF	(Belarus)	14	Alyaksandr Martynovich	2	0	0	2
8	DF	(Georgia (country))	44	Luka Gadrani	1	1	0	2
8	DF	(Uzbekistan)	3	Ibrokhimkhalil Yuldoshev	1	0	1	2
8	DF	(Israel)	15	Ofri Arad	1	1	0	2
8				Own goal	2	0	0	2
14	MF	(Russia)	20	Dmitry Sergeyev	1	0	0	1
14	DF	(Russia)	80	Yegor Sorokin	1	0	0	1
14	MF	(Belarus)	55	Valery Gromyko	1	0	0	1
14	MF	(Kazakhstan)	96	Olzhas Baybek	1	0	0	1
14	DF	(Kazakhstan)	25	Aleksandr Shirobokov	0	0	1	1
				TOTALS	39	4	15	48

=== Clean sheets ===
Place	Position	Nation	Number	Name	Premier League	Kazakhstan Cup	League Cup	Total
1	GK	(Russia)	30	Vadim Ulyanov	6	1	1	8
2	GK	(Kazakhstan)	1	Danil Ustimenko	2	0	2	4
				TOTALS	8	1	3	12

=== Disciplinary record ===
Number	Nation	Position	Name	Premier League		Kazakhstan Cup		League Cup		Total	
Number	Nation	Position	Name	Booked	Sent off (straight red)	Booked	Sent off (straight red)	Booked	Sent off (straight red)	Booked	Sent off (straight red)
1	(Kazakhstan)	GK	Danil Ustimenko	1	0	0	0	0	0	1	0
3	(Uzbekistan)	DF	Ibrokhimkhalil Yuldoshev	5	0	0	0	0	0	5	0
4	(Kazakhstan)	DF	Damir Kasabulat	2	0	0	0	1	0	3	0
6	(Kazakhstan)	MF	Adilet Sadybekov	3	0	0	0	0	0	3	0
7	(Georgia (country))	MF	Giorgi Zaria	5	0	1	0	1	0	7	0
9	(Kazakhstan)	FW	Vyacheslav Shvyryov	5	0	1	0	1	0	7	0
11	(Brazil)	FW	João Paulo	2	0	0	0	0	0	2	0
13	(Kazakhstan)	DF	Lev Kurgin	1	0	0	0	0	0	1	0
14	(Belarus)	DF	Alyaksandr Martynovich	2	0	0	0	0	0	2	0
15	(Israel)	DF	Ofri Arad	9	0	1	0	1	0	11	0
19	(Brazil)	FW	Élder Santana	4	0	0	0	0	0	4	0
21	(Kazakhstan)	MF	Arsen Buranchiev	2	1	0	0	0	0	2	1
22	(Kazakhstan)	MF	Yerkebulan Seydakhmet	5	0	1	0	1	0	7	0
23	(Russia)	DF	Andrey Ulshin	2	0	0	0	0	0	2	0
30	(Russia)	GK	Vadim Ulyanov	1	0	0	0	0	0	1	0
44	(Georgia (country))	DF	Luka Gadrani	3	0	0	0	1	0	4	0
55	(Belarus)	MF	Valery Gromyko	2	0	0	0	1	0	3	0
80	(Russia)	DF	Yegor Sorokin	1	0	0	0	0	0	1	0
Players away on loan:
25	(Kazakhstan)	DF	Aleksandr Shirobokov	1	0	0	0	0	0	1	0
Players who left Kairat during the season:
5	(Russia)	DF	Viktor Vasin	3	0	0	0	0	0	3	0
			TOTALS	59	1	4	0	7	0	70	1
