= 2025 Kazakhstan Super Cup =

| Kairat | Aktobe |
| 2 | 0 |
- Date: 22 February 2025
- Venue: Astana Arena, Astana
- Referee: Sayat Karabayev
- Attendance: 23,975

The 2025 Kazakhstan Super Cup was the 18th Kazakhstan Super Cup, an annual football match played between the winners of the previous season's Premier League, Kairat, and the winners of the previous season's Kazakhstan Cup, Aktobe. The match was played on 23 February 2025, at the Astana Arena in Astana, with Kairat winning their third title, defeating Aktobe 2–0.

== Match details ==
23 February 2025
15:00 (UTC+5)

| Kairat | 2 – 0 | Aktobe |
|---|---|---|
| Santana 58'; Gromyko 87' | Report |

Astana Arena, Astana
Attendance: 23,975
Referee: Sayat Karabayev

| Kairat | Aktobe |

| GK | 1 | (Kazakhstan) Alexander Zarutsky |
| DF | 14 | (Belarus) Alyaksandr Martynovich |
| DF | 20 | (Kazakhstan) Yerkin Tapalov | (yellow card) 32' (yellow-red card) 62' |
| DF | 80 | (Russia) Yegor Sorokin |
| MF | 10 | (Georgia (country)) Giorgi Zaria | | (substituted off) 69' |
| MF | 15 | (Israel) Ofri Arad |
| MF | 18 | (Israel) Dan Glazer |
| MF | 33 | (Serbia) Jug Stanojev |
| MF | 55 | (Belarus) Valery Gromyko | (yellow card) 89' | (substituted off) 89' |
| FW | 11 | (Brazil) João Paulo | | (substituted off) 66' |
| FW | 19 | (Brazil) Élder Santana |
Substitutes:
| GK | 77 | (Kazakhstan) Temirlan Anarbekov |
| DF | 4 | (Kazakhstan) Damir Kasabulat | | (substituted in) 66' |
| DF | 5 | (Kazakhstan) Lev Kurgin |
| FW | 7 | (Portugal) Jorginho | | (substituted in) 89' |
| FW | 9 | (Kazakhstan) Dastan Satpayev | | (substituted in) 69' |
| DF | 25 | (Kazakhstan) Aleksandr Shirobokov |
| DF | 59 | (Kazakhstan) Daniyar Tashpulatov |
| FW | 81 | (Kazakhstan) Ismail Bekbolat |
| FW | 89 | (Kazakhstan) Ramazan Bagdat |
Manager:
(Kazakhstan) Rafael Urazbakhtin

| GK | 25 | (Romania) Andrei Vlad |
| DF | 2 | (Kazakhstan) Lev Skvortsov | (yellow card) 2' | (substituted off) 75' |
| DF | 6 | (Kazakhstan) Alibek Kasym | (yellow card) 66' |
| DF | 21 | (Serbia) Nemanja Anđelković |
| DF | 24 | (Kazakhstan) Bagdat Kairov | | (substituted off) 55' |
| MF | 4 | (Nigeria) Uche Agbo |
| MF | 22 | (Kazakhstan) Yerkebulan Seydakhmet | (yellow card) 45+1' |
| MF | 66 | (Nigeria) Mario Rabiu | | (substituted off) 90' |
| MF | 99 | (Panama) Freddy Góndola | | (substituted off) 90' |
| FW | 10 | (Russia) Idris Umayev |
| FW | 19 | (Kazakhstan) Oralkhan Omirtayev | | (substituted off) 55' |
Substitutes:
| GK | 1 | (Kazakhstan) Igor Trofimets |
| FW | 9 | (Serbia) Djordje Ivkovic | (yellow card) 90+4' | (substituted in) 55' |
| FW | 11 | (Kazakhstan) Aybar Abdulla | | (substituted in) 90' |
| FW | 12 | (Guinea) Amadou Doumbouya |
| DF | 15 | (Cameroon) Gaby Kiki |
| DF | 31 | (Kazakhstan) Adilkhan Tanzharikov | | (substituted in) 75' |
| MF | 42 | (Kazakhstan) Ayan Baydavletov |
| MF | 48 | (Kazakhstan) Alisher Kenzhegulov |
| MF | 67 | (Kazakhstan) Darkhan Berdibek | | (substituted in) 90' |
| DF | 88 | (Romania) Bogdan Vătăjelu | | (substituted in) 55' |
| DF | 91 | (Kazakhstan) Sayat Zhumagali |
Manager:
(Ukraine) Ihor Leonov

Assistant referees:
Timur Tursymbayev
Nurzhan Zhunisov
Fourth official:
Georgy Chekhovsky
Video assistant referee:
Aidyn Tasybayev
Assistant video assistant referee:
Timur Kumashev

== See also ==
- 2024 Kazakhstan Premier League
- 2024 Kazakhstan Cup
