= Aleksandr Mrynsky =

Kazakhstani footballer

Personal information
- Full name: Aleksandr Sergeyevich Mrynsky
- Date of birth: 15 July 2004 (age 22)
- Place of birth: Aktobe, Kazakhstan
- Height: 1.76 m (5 ft 9 in)
- Position: Right-back

Team information
- Current team: Kairat
- Number: 24

Youth career
- Aktobe
- 2019–2021: Kairat

Senior career*
| Years | Team | Apps | (Gls) |
| 2021–2025 | Kairat-Zhastar | 71 | (4) |
| 2021– | Kairat | 55 | (1) |

International career^{‡}
| 2021 | Kazakhstan U17 | 2 | (0) |
| 2022 | Kazakhstan U19 | 7 | (0) |
| 2024–2025 | Kazakhstan U21 | 8 | (1) |
| 2026– | Kazakhstan | 7 | (0) |
- * Club domestic league appearances and goals as of 1 November 2026 ‡ National team caps and goals as of 14 November 2026

Aleksandr Sergeyevich Mrynsky (Russian: Александр Сергеевич Мрынский; born 15 July 2004) is a Kazakh professional footballer who plays as a right-back for Kairat and the Kazakhstan national team.

== Club career ==
Mrynsky is a product of the youth academy of the Kazakhstani clubs Aktobe and Kairat. He first started playing for the senior Kairat team in 2021, and on 7 March 2023 signed his first contract with the club until 2026. In 2024, he helped the club win the 2024 Kazakhstan Premier League. This helped the club achieve their first ever qualification to the UEFA Champions League. On 10 November 2024, he extended his contract with Kairat until 2027. The following season he helped the club win the 2025 Kazakhstan Super Cup and 2025 Kazakhstan Premier League. On 25 January 2026, he extended his contract with the club until 2028.

== International career ==
Mrynsky was called up to the senior Kazakhstan national team for a set of 2026 FIFA Series matches in March 2026..

== Career statistics ==
=== Club ===
As of match played 15 October 2026

Appearances and goals by club, season and competition
| Club | Season | League | | | Cup | | League Cup | | Europe | | Other | | Total | |
| Club | Season | Division | Apps | Goals | Apps | Goals | Apps | Goals | Apps | Goals | Apps | Goals | Apps | Goals |
|---|---|---|---|---|---|---|---|---|---|---|---|---|---|---|
| Kairat-Zhastar | 2021 | Kazakhstan First League | 9 | 1 | — | | — | | — | | — | | 9 | 1 |
| Kairat-Zhastar | 2022 | Kazakhstan First League | 20 | 1 | — | | — | | — | | — | | 20 | 1 |
| Kairat-Zhastar | 2023 | Kazakhstan First League | 23 | 0 | — | | — | | — | | — | | 23 | 0 |
| Kairat-Zhastar | 2024 | Kazakhstan First League | 14 | 1 | — | | — | | — | | — | | 14 | 1 |
| Kairat-Zhastar | 2025 | Kazakhstan First League | 5 | 1 | — | | — | | — | | — | | 5 | 1 |
| Kairat-Zhastar | Total | | 71 | 4 | — | | — | | — | | — | | 71 | 4 |
| Kairat | 2021 | Kazakhstan Premier League | 0 | 0 | 2 | 0 | — | | — | | — | | 2 | 0 |
| Kairat | 2022 | Kazakhstan Premier League | 0 | 0 | 1 | 0 | — | | — | | — | | 1 | 0 |
| Kairat | 2023 | Kazakhstan Premier League | 2 | 0 | 2 | 0 | — | | — | | — | | 4 | 0 |
| Kairat | 2024 | Kazakhstan Premier League | 10 | 0 | 1 | 0 | 2 | 0 | — | | — | | 13 | 0 |
| Kairat | 2025 | Kazakhstan Premier League | 16 | 0 | 1 | 0 | — | | 14 (Note: Appearances in UEFA Champions League) | 1 | — | | 31 | 1 |
| Kairat | 2026 | Kazakhstan Premier League | 25 | 1 | 0 | 0 | — | | 11 (Note: Eight appearances in UEFA Champions League, two appearances in UEFA Europa League, one appearance in UEFA Conference League) | 0 | 1 (Note: Appearance in Kazakhstan Super Cup) | 1 | 37 | 2 |
| Kairat | Total | | 53 | 1 | 7 | 0 | 2 | 0 | 25 | 1 | 1 | 1 | 88 | 3 |
| Career total | | | 124 | 5 | 7 | 0 | 2 | 0 | 25 | 1 | 1 | 1 | 159 | 7 |

=== International ===
As of match played 14 November 2026

Appearances and goals by national team and year
| National team | Year | Apps | Goals |
|---|---|---|---|
| Kazakhstan | 2026 | 7 | 0 |
| Total | | 7 | 0 |

== Honours ==
Kairat

- Kazakhstan Cup: 2021
- Kazakhstan Premier League: 2024, 2025
- Kazakhstan Super Cup: 2025
