= Damir Kasabulat =

Kazakhstani footballer

Personal information
- Full name: Damir Qairatūly Qasabolat
- Date of birth: 29 August 2002 (age 24)
- Place of birth: Almaty, Kazakhstan
- Height: 1.82 m (6 ft 0 in)
- Position: Defender

Team information
- Current team: Kairat
- Number: 4

Youth career
- 2012–2020: Kairat-Zhastar

Senior career*
Years	Team	Apps	(Gls)
2020–2021	Kairat-Zhastar	22	(1)
2021–2022	Kairat Moscow	16	(0)
2022–	Kairat	96	(0)

International career^{‡}
2018	Kazakhstan U17	1	(0)
2022–2024	Kazakhstan U21	13	(1)
2025–	Kazakhstan	7	(0)
- * Club domestic league appearances and goals as of 1 November 2026 ‡ National team caps and goals as of 15:18, 6 October 2026 (UTC)

Damir Kayratuly Kasabulat (Kazakh: Дамир Қайратұлы Қасаболат, romanized: Damir Qairatūly Qasabolat; born 29 August 2002) is a Kazakh professional footballer who plays as a defender for Kairat and the Kazakhstan national team.

== Club career ==
Kasabulat is a product of the youth academy of the Kazakhstani club Kairat since 2012. On 21 March 2020, he was promoted to their reserve team Kairat-Zhastar in the Kazakhstan First Division. For the 2021–23 season he joined their Russian based affiliate club Kairat Moscow. On 25 February 2022, he returned to Kairat signing a 2-year contract. On 27 December 2022, he extended his contract with Kairat until 2025. In 2024, he helped the club win the 2024 Kazakhstan Premier League. This helped the club achieve their first ever qualification to the UEFA Champions League. The following season he helped the club win the 2025 Kazakhstan Super Cup and 2025 Kazakhstan Premier League.

== International career ==
Kasabulat played for the Kazakhstan U21s for 2025 UEFA European Under-19 Championship qualification matches in 2024. On 19 August 2025, he received his first call-up to the senior Kazakhstan national team for a set of 2026 FIFA World Cup qualification matches in September 2025.

== Career statistics ==
=== Club ===
As of match played 15 October 2026

Appearances and goals by club, season and competition
Club	Season	League			Cup (Note: Includes Russian Cup)		League Cup		Europe		Other		Total	
Club	Season	Division	Apps	Goals	Apps	Goals	Apps	Goals	Apps	Goals	Apps	Goals	Apps	Goals
Kairat-Zhastar	2020	Kazakhstan First League	12	0	—		—		—		—		12	0
Kairat-Zhastar	2021	Kazakhstan First League	10	1	—		—		—		—		10	1
Kairat-Zhastar	Total		22	1	—		—		—		—		22	1
Kairat Moscow	2021–22	FNL 2	16	0	4	0	—		—		—		20	0
Kairat	2022	Kazakhstan Premier League	23	0	7	0	—		2 (Note: Appearances in UEFA Conference League)	0	—		32	0
Kairat	2023	Kazakhstan Premier League	25	0	4	0	—		—		—		29	0
Kairat	2024	Kazakhstan Premier League	14	0	2	0	5	0	—		—		21	0
Kairat	2025	Kazakhstan Premier League	23	0	2	0	—		13 (Note: Appearances in UEFA Champions League)	0	1 (Note: Appearance in Kazakhstan Super Cup)	0	39	0
Kairat	2026	Kazakhstan Premier League	9	0	0	0	0	0	7 (Note: Five appearances in UEFA Champions League, one appearance in UEFA Europa League, one appearance in UEFA Conference League)	0	1	0	16	0
Kairat	Total		94	0	15	0	5	0	22	0	2	0	138	0
Career total			132	1	19	0	5	0	22	0	2	0	180	1

=== International ===
As of match played 5 October 2026

Appearances and goals by national team and year
National team	Year	Apps	Goals
Kazakhstan	2025	5	0
Kazakhstan	2026	2	0
Total		7	0

== Honours ==
Kairat

- Kazakhstan Premier League: 2024, 2025
- Kazakhstan Super Cup: 2025
