= Jorginho (footballer, born 1997) =

Portuguese footballer (born 1997)

Personal information
- Full name: Jorge Gabriel Costa Monteiro
- Date of birth: 9 November 1997 (age 29)
- Place of birth: Braga, Portugal
- Height: 1.69 m (5 ft 7 in)
- Position: Striker

Team information
- Current team: Kairat
- Number: 7

Senior career*
Years	Team	Apps	(Gls)
2014–2017	Celeirós		
2017–2020	Merelinense	72	(18)
2020–2021	Fafe	25	(4)
2021–2023	Pevidém	48	(21)
2023–2024	Differdange	46	(39)
2025–	Kairat	45	(18)
- * Club domestic league appearances and goals as of 26 July 2026

Jorge Gabriel Costa Monteiro (born 9 November 1997) is a Portuguese professional footballer who plays as a striker for Kazakhstani club Kairat.

== Early life ==
Jorginho is a native of Celeirós, Portugal. He is the son of Jorge Monteiro and Anabela Monteiro.

== Career ==
In 2023, Jorginho signed for Luxembourgish side Differdange. He helped the club win the league.

On 20 December 2024, Kazakhstan Premier League club Kairat announced the signing of Jorginho from Differdange to a two-year contract.

== Personal life ==
Jorginho was born in 1997 in Portugal. He has worked at a car screen factory.

== Career statistics ==
As of match played 26 July 2026

Appearances and goals by club, season and competition
Club	Season	League			National cup		Europe		Other		Total	
Club	Season	Division	Apps	Goals	Apps	Goals	Apps	Goals	Apps	Goals	Apps	Goals
Merelinense	2017–18	Campeonato de Portugal	19	8	—		—		—		19	8
Merelinense	2018–19	Campeonato de Portugal	29	2	1	0	—		—		30	2
Merelinense	2019–20	Campeonato de Portugal	24	8	2	0	—		—		26	8
Merelinense	2020–21	Campeonato de Portugal	0	0	4	1	—		—		4	1
Merelinense	Total		72	18	7	1	—		—		79	19
Fafe	2020–21	Campeonato de Portugal	20	2	3	1	—		—		23	3
Fafe	2021–22	Liga 3	5	0	0	0	—		—		5	0
Fafe	Total		25	2	3	1	—		—		28	3
Pevidém	2021–22	Liga 3	22	5	—		—		—		22	5
Pevidém	2022–23	Liga 3	26	16	3	1	—		—		29	17
Pevidém	Total		48	21	3	1	—		—		51	22
Differdange	2023–24	Luxembourg National Division	28	25	4	3	0	0	—		32	28
Differdange	2024–25	Luxembourg National Division	18	14	2	3	4 (Note: Two appearances and 1 goal in UEFA Champions League, two appearances and three goals in UEFA Conference League)	3	—		24	20
Differdange	Total		46	39	6	6	4	3	—		56	48
Kairat	2025	Kazakhstan Premier League	26	10	2	0	14 (Note: Appearances in UEFA Champions League)	2	1 (Note: Appearance in Kazakhstan Super Cup)	0	43	12
Kairat	2026	Kazakhstan Premier League	19	8	0	0	5	2	1	0	25	10
Kairat	Total		45	18	2	0	19	4	2	0	68	22
Career total			236	99	21	9	23	7	2	0	282	114

== Honours ==
Individual

- Luxembourg National Division: 2023–24 Top goalscorer

Kairat

- Kazakhstan Premier League: 2025
- Kazakhstan Super Cup: 2025
