= Ofri Arad =

Israeli footballer

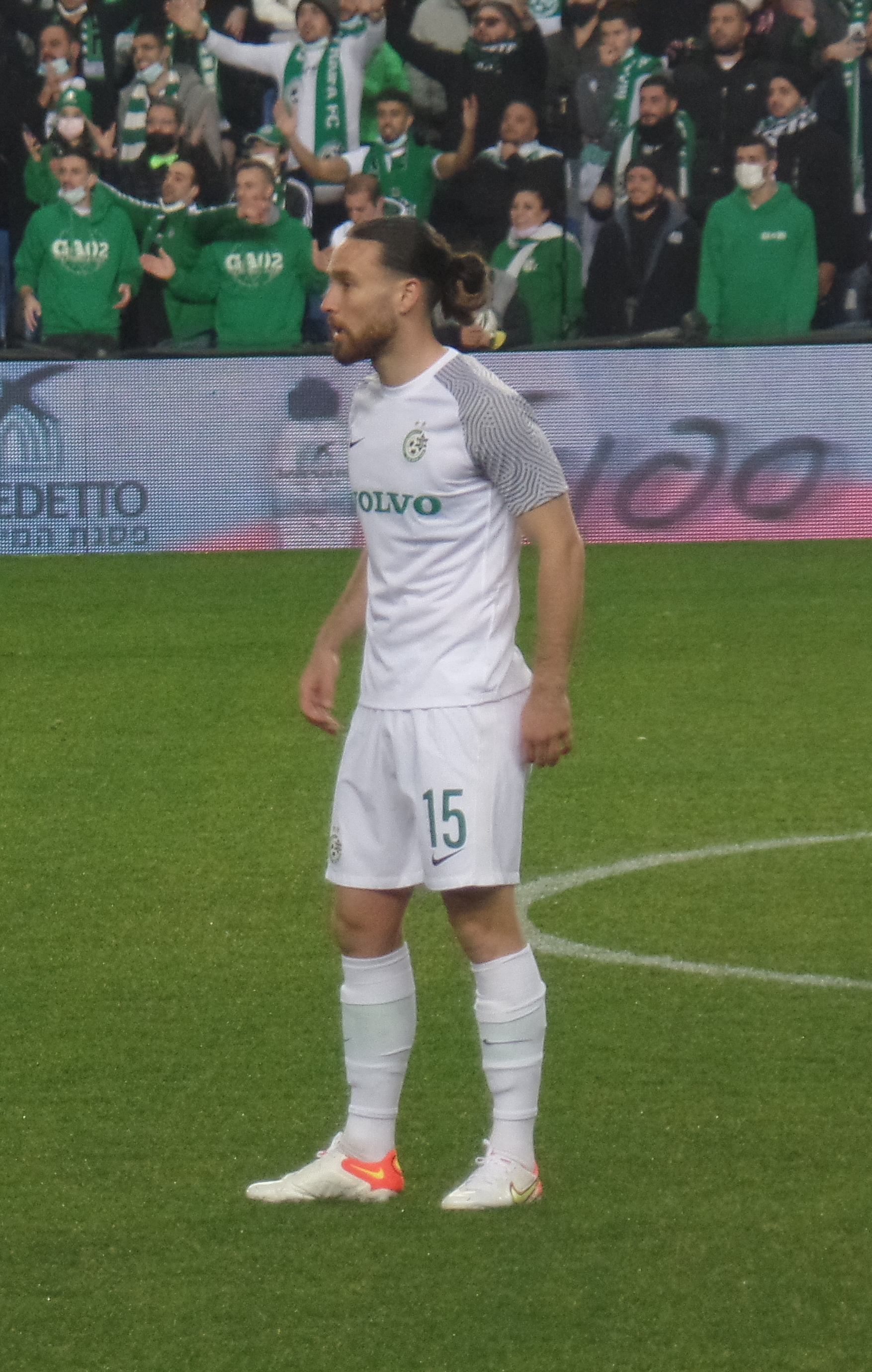
- Arad with Maccabi Haifa in 2022

Personal information
- Date of birth: 11 September 1998 (age 28)
- Place of birth: HaHotrim, Israel
- Height: 1.82 m (6 ft 0 in)
- Positions: Defensive midfielder; centre-back

Team information
- Current team: FCSB
- Number: 15

Youth career
- 2008–2017: Maccabi Haifa

Senior career*
Years	Team	Apps	(Gls)
2017–2023	Maccabi Haifa	111	(4)
2017–2018	→ Hapoel Ramat Gan (loan)	34	(4)
2023	→ Kairat (loan)	24	(0)
2024–2026	Kairat	45	(1)
2026–	FCSB	14	(1)

International career^{‡}
2016	Israel U18	2	(0)
2016–2017	Israel U19	5	(0)
2018–2020	Israel U21	11	(2)
2020–	Israel	10	(0)
- * Club domestic league appearances and goals as of 7 November 2026 ‡ National team caps and goals as of 8 June 2024

Ofri Arad (Hebrew: עופרי ארד; born 11 September 1998) is an Israeli professional footballer who plays a defensive midfielder or a centre-back for Liga I club FCSB.

== Early life ==
Arad was born in kibbutz HaHotrim, Israel, to a Jewish family. He is the youngest brother of former footballer Dori Arad.

== Club career ==
Arad made his official debut for Maccabi Haifa on 4 August 2018 in a game against Hapoel Ironi Kiryat Shmona in the Toto Cup and also score the winning goal.

He made his Israeli Premier League debut for Maccabi Haifa on 4 December 2018 in a game against Bnei Sakhnin.

He scored is first league goal on 4 December 2019 in a game against F.C. Ashdod.

On 30 May 2021 he won his first adult title, as winning the Israeli Premier League championship, after making 32 league appearances and scoring 1 league goal.

On 19 February 2023, he was loaned to the Kazakhstan Premier League club FC Kairat for one season.

== International career ==
Arad made his senior debut for Israel against Slovakia on 14 October 2020, coming in as a substitute after half time and contributing to a surprise 3–2 win.

== Career statistics ==
=== Club ===
As of match played 7 November 2026

Appearances and goals by club, season and competition
Club	Season	League			National cup (Note: Includes Israel State Cup, Kazakhstan Cup, Cupa României)		League cup (Note: Includes Toto Cup)		Europe		Other		Total	
Club	Season	Division	Apps	Goals	Apps	Goals	Apps	Goals	Apps	Goals	Apps	Goals	Apps	Goals
Hapoel Ramat Gan (loan)	2017–18	Israeli Premier League	34	4	2	0	1	0	—		—		37	4
Maccabi Haifa	2018–19	Israeli Premier League	21	0	1	0	2	1	—		—		24	1
Maccabi Haifa	2019–20	Israeli Premier League	33	2	2	1	1	0	4 (Note: Appearances in UEFA Europa League)	0	—		40	3
Maccabi Haifa	2020–21	Israeli Premier League	32	1	4	0	3	1	4	0	—		43	2
Maccabi Haifa	2021–22	Israeli Premier League	21	1	5	1	0	0	5 (Note: Appearances in UEFA Conference League)	0	0	0	31	2
Maccabi Haifa	2022–23	Israeli Premier League	4	0	1	0	1	1	4 (Note: Appearances in UEFA Champions League)	0	—		10	1
Maccabi Haifa	Total		111	4	13	2	7	3	17	0	0	0	148	6
Kairat (loan)	2023	Kazakhstan Premier League	24	0	3	0	—		—		—		27	0
Kairat	2024	Kazakhstan Premier League	22	1	2	1	5	0	—		—		29	2
Kairat	2025	Kazakhstan Premier League	23	0	2	0	—		10	1	1 (Note: Appearance in Kazakhstan Super Cup)	0	36	1
Kairat	Total		69	1	7	1	5	0	10	1	1	0	92	3
FCSB	2025–26	Liga I	5	0	0	0	—		0	0	2 (Note: Appearances in Liga I European play-offs)	1	7	1
FCSB	2026–27	Liga I	9	1	2	0	—		0	0	—		11	1
FCSB	Total		14	1	2	0	—		0	0	2	1	18	2
Career total			228	10	24	3	13	3	27	1	3	1	295	18

=== International ===
As of match played 8 June 2024

Appearances and goals by national team and year
National team	Year	Apps	Goals
Israel	2020	1	0
Israel	2021	7	0
Israel	2023	1	0
Israel	2024	1	0
Total		10	0

== Honours ==
Maccabi Haifa

- Israeli Premier League: 2020–21, 2021–22
- Israel State Cup runner-up: 2021–22
- Toto Cup: 2021–22
- Israel Super Cup: 2021

Kairat

- Kazakhstan Premier League: 2024, 2025
- Kazakhstan Super Cup: 2025
