= Yegor Sorokin =

Russian footballer (born 1995)

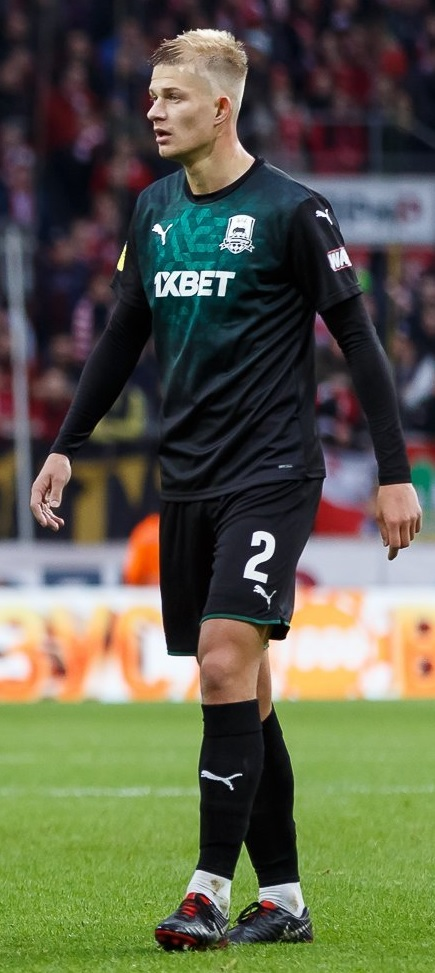
- Sorokin with FC Krasnodar in 2020

Personal information
- Full name: Yegor Andreyevich Sorokin
- Date of birth: 4 November 1995 (age 31)
- Place of birth: Saint Petersburg, Russia
- Height: 1.92 m (6 ft 4 in)
- Position: Centre-back

Team information
- Current team: Chengdu Rongcheng
- Number: 28

Youth career
- –2007: Smena St. Petersburg
- 2007–2010: Zenit St. Petersburg
- 2010: Fakel St. Petersburg
- 2010–2012: Moskovskaya Zastava St. Petersburg
- 2012–2013: Tosno

Senior career*
Years	Team	Apps	(Gls)
2013	Tosno	0	(0)
2014–2019	Rubin Kazan	53	(6)
2014–2015	→ Rubin-2 Kazan	17	(0)
2016	→ Aktobe (loan)	29	(1)
2017	→ Neftekhimik Nizhnekamsk (loan)	10	(1)
2019–2023	Krasnodar	56	(0)
2019	→ Rubin Kazan (loan)	6	(0)
2020–2023	Krasnodar-2	4	(0)
2023–2024	Rubin Kazan	0	(0)
2024	Yelimay	8	(0)
2024–2026	Kairat	33	(2)
2026–	Chengdu Rongcheng	29	(4)

International career^{‡}
2018	Russia	1	(0)
- * Club domestic league appearances and goals as of 8 November 2026 ‡ National team caps and goals as of 10 September 2018

Yegor Andreyevich Sorokin (Russian: Егор Андреевич Сорокин; born 4 November 1995) is a Russian professional footballer who plays as a centre-back for Chinese Super League club Chengdu Rongcheng.

== Club career ==
=== Early career in Russia ===
Sorokin made his debut in the Russian Premier League on 14 September 2014 for Rubin Kazan in a game against Rostov. It took him three years to appear for the main Rubin squad again, when he started a match against SKA-Khabarovsk on 13 August 2017. Sorokin became a regular for Rubin in the 2017–18 season. On 9 December 2018, he scored twice to secure a 2–1 away victory against then-champions FC Zenit St. Petersburg.

On 2 September 2019, Sorokin signed a five-year contract with Krasnodar and returned to Rubin on loan for the rest of the 2019–20 season. On 30 December 2019, Krasnodar sought to terminate his loan early.

On 8 September 2023, Sorokin returned to Rubin Kazan with a contract until the end of the 2023–24 season. He made two Russian Cup appearances and did not play league matches in his second stint with the club. On 7 February 2024, Sorokin left Rubin by mutual consent.

=== Playing abroad ===
On 22 July 2024, Sorokin signed for Kazakhstan Premier League club Kairat on a short-term contract until the end of 2025. On 29 January 2026, Kairat announced that he had left the club following the expiration of his contract.

On 5 February 2026, Sorokin joined Chinese Super League club Chengdu Rongcheng.

== International career ==
Sorokin received his first call-up to the Russia national team for friendly matches against Turkey and Czech Republic in September 2018. He made his debut on 10 September against the latter, replacing Konstantin Rausch in the 87th minute, ending in a 5–1 victory for the Russians.

== Career statistics ==
=== Club ===
As of match played 8 November 2026

Appearances and goals by club, season and competition
Club	Season	League			National cup		League cup		Continental		Other		Total	
Club	Season	Division	Apps	Goals	Apps	Goals	Apps	Goals	Apps	Goals	Apps	Goals	Apps	Goals
Tosno	2013–14	Russian Second League	0	0	0	0	—		—		—		0	0
Rubin Kazan	2014–15	Russian Premier League	1	0	0	0	—		—		—		1	0
Rubin Kazan	2015–16	Russian Premier League	0	0	1	0	—		0	0	—		1	0
Rubin Kazan	2017–18	Russian Premier League	17	0	2	1	—		—		—		19	1
Rubin Kazan	2018–19	Russian Premier League	27	6	3	0	—		—		—		30	6
Rubin Kazan	2019–20	Russian Premier League	8	0	—		—		—		—		8	0
Rubin Kazan	Total		53	6	6	1	—		—		—		59	7
Rubin-2 Kazan	2014–15	Russian Second League	17	0	—		—		—		—		17	0
Aktobe (loan)	2016	Kazakhstan Premier League	29	1	0	0	—		2 (Note: Appearances in the UEFA Europa League)	0	—		31	1
Neftekhimik (loan)	2016–17	Russian First League	10	1	—		—		—		—		10	1
Krasnodar	2019–20	Russian Premier League	8	0	—		—		—		—		8	0
Krasnodar	2020–21	Russian Premier League	15	0	1	0	—		4 (Note: Appearances in the UEFA Champions League)	0	—		20	0
Krasnodar	2021–22	Russian Premier League	26	0	2	0	—		—		—		28	0
Krasnodar	2022–23	Russian Premier League	7	0	4	0	—		—		—		11	0
Krasnodar	2023–24	Russian Premier League	0	0	0	0	—		—		—		0	0
Krasnodar	Total		56	0	7	0	—		4	0	—		67	0
Rubin Kazan (loan)	2019–20	Russian Premier League	6	0	1	0	—		—		—		7	0
Krasnodar-2	2020–21	Russian First League	1	0	—		—		—		—		1	0
Krasnodar-2	2023–24	Russian Second League A	3	0	—		—		—		—		3	0
Krasnodar-2	Total		4	0	—		—		—		0	0	4	0
Rubin Kazan	2023–24	Russian Premier League	0	0	2	0	—		—		—		2	0
Yelimay	2024	Kazakhstan Premier League	8	0	4	0	0	0	—		—		12	0
Kairat	2024	Kazakhstan Premier League	11	1	0	0	2	0	—		—		13	1
Kairat	2025	Kazakhstan Premier League	22	1	2	0	0	0	14	0	1 (Note: Appearance in Kazakhstan Super Cup)	0	39	1
Kairat	2026	Kazakhstan Premier League	0	0	0	0	0	0	2	0	—		2	0
Kairat	Total		33	2	2	0	2	0	16	0	1	0	54	2
Chengdu Rongcheng	2026	Chinese Super League	29	4	1	0	—		1 (Note: Appearance in AFC Champions League Elite)	0	—		31	4
Career total			245	14	23	1	2	0	17	0	7	0	294	15

== Honours ==
Kairat

- Kazakhstan Premier League: 2024, 2025
- Kazakhstan Super Cup: 2025
