= Aleksandr Martynovich =

Belarusian footballer

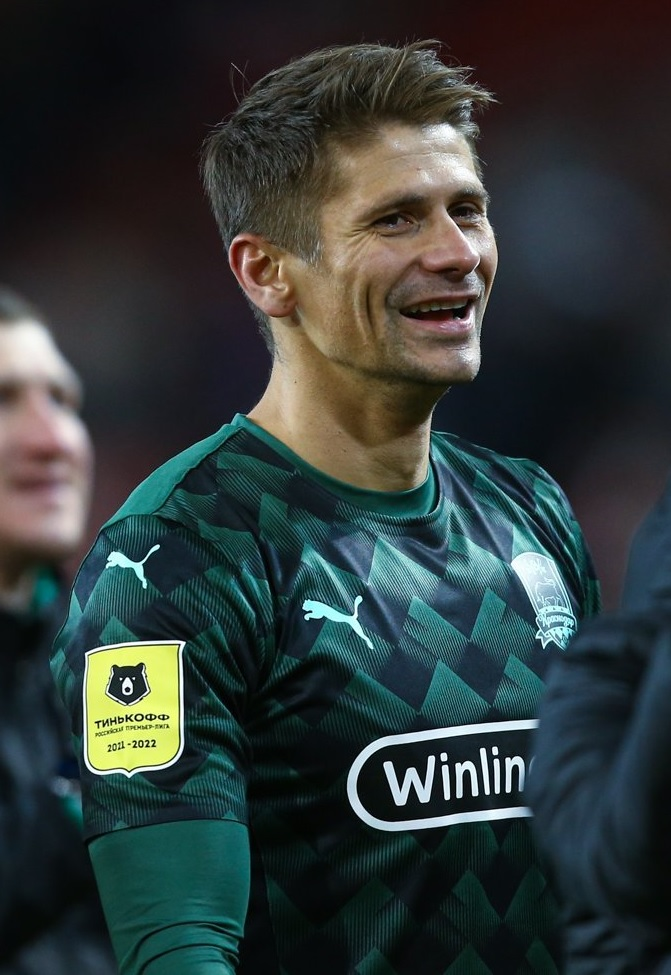
- Martynovich with Krasnodar in 2022

Personal information
- Full name: Aleksandr Vladimirovich Martynovich
- Date of birth: 26 August 1987 (age 39)
- Place of birth: Minsk, Belarusian SSR, Soviet Union
- Height: 1.93 m (6 ft 4 in)
- Position: Centre-back

Team information
- Current team: Kairat
- Number: 14

Youth career
- 2002–2003: RUOR Minsk
- 2004–2006: Dinamo Minsk

Senior career*
Years	Team	Apps	(Gls)
2003	RUOR Minsk	3	(0)
2006–2010	Dinamo Minsk	97	(3)
2010–2022	Krasnodar	212	(6)
2015–2016	→ Ural Yekaterinburg (loan)	24	(0)
2022–2024	Rubin Kazan	46	(3)
2024–	Kairat	58	(7)

International career^{‡}
2004	Belarus U17	3	(0)
2005–2006	Belarus U19	6	(0)
2006–2009	Belarus U21	19	(0)
2009–	Belarus	84	(2)
- * Club domestic league appearances and goals as of 1 November 2026 ‡ National team caps and goals as of 12 October 2025

Aleksandr Vladimirovich Martynovich (Belarusian: Аляксандр Уладзіміравіч Мартыновіч; Russian: Александр Владимирович Мартынович; born 26 August 1987) is a Belarusian professional footballer who plays as a centre-back for Kazakhstan Premier League club Kairat. In June 2011, he acquired Russian citizenship as well and is not considered a foreign player in Russian football competitions. He has played for the Belarus national team for 16 years.

== Club career ==
On 15 July 2010, Martynovich signed a 2.5-year contract with Russian First Division side Krasnodar, extending his contract for the first time in December 2012 for another 2.5-years, before extending it again in December 2014 till the summer of 2018. He left Krasnodar as his contract expired in May 2022.

On 13 June 2022, Martynovich signed a two-year contract with Rubin Kazan. He left Rubin as his contract expired on 16 June 2024.

On 18 June 2024, Martynovich signed with Kairat in Kazakhstan until the end of 2025.

== International career ==
Martynovich was part of the Belarus U-21 squad that participated in the 2009 UEFA European Under-21 Football Championship and played as a starter in the 1–5 loss against Sweden U-21, during which he scored an unfortunate own goal. He has been capped for Belarus national team since November 2009, receiving his first call-up during Bernd Stange's tenure as coach. On 17 November 2010, Martynovich scored his only two goals for the team in the 4–0 away win against Oman in a friendly match. In March 2015, he succeeded Timofei Kalachev as the captain of the national team.

== Career statistics ==
=== Club ===
As of match played 15 October 2026

Appearances and goals by club, season and competition
Club	Season	League			National cup (Note: Includes Belarusian Cup, Russian Cup, Kazakhstan Cup)		League cup (Note: Includes Kazakhstan League Cup)		Europe		Other		Total	
Club	Season	Division	Apps	Goals	Apps	Goals	Apps	Goals	Apps	Goals	Apps	Goals	Apps	Goals
Dinamo Minsk	2006	Belarusian Premier League	3	0	4	0	–		0	0	–		7	0
Dinamo Minsk	2007	Belarusian Premier League	24	0	4	0	–		4 (Note: Appearances in UEFA Cup)	0	–		32	0
Dinamo Minsk	2008	Belarusian Premier League	27	0	–		–		–		–		27	0
Dinamo Minsk	2009	Belarusian Premier League	25	0	4	0	–		3 (Note: Appearance(s) in UEFA Europa League)	1	–		32	1
Dinamo Minsk	2010	Belarusian Premier League	18	3	–		–		1	0	–		19	3
Dinamo Minsk	Total		97	3	12	0	–		8	1	–		117	4
Krasnodar	2010	Russian Premier League	15	0	0	0	–		–		–		15	0
Krasnodar	2011–12	Russian Premier League	23	1	2	0	–		–		–		25	1
Krasnodar	2012–13	Russian Premier League	21	2	1	0	–		–		–		22	2
Krasnodar	2013–14	Russian Premier League	24	0	3	0	–		–		–		27	0
Krasnodar	2014–15	Russian Premier League	11	0	2	0	–		4	0	–		17	0
Krasnodar	2016–17	Russian Premier League	14	1	2	0	–		8	0	–		24	1
Krasnodar	2017–18	Russian Premier League	22	1	1	0	–		4	0	–		27	1
Krasnodar	2018–19	Russian Premier League	28	0	4	0	–		9	0	–		41	0
Krasnodar	2019–20	Russian Premier League	22	1	0	0	–		8 (Note: Two appearances in UEFA Champions League, six appearances in UEFA Europa League)	0	–		30	1
Krasnodar	2020–21	Russian Premier League	24	0	1	0	–		8 (Note: Six appearances in UEFA Champions League, two appearances in UEFA Europa League)	0	–		33	0
Krasnodar	2021–22	Russian Premier League	8	0	0	0	–		–		–		8	0
Krasnodar	Total		212	6	16	0	–		41	0	–		269	6
Ural Yekaterinburg (loan)	2015–16	Russian Premier League	24	0	1	0	–		–		–		25	0
Rubin Kazan	2022–23	Russian First League	26	0	0	0	–		–		–		26	0
Rubin Kazan	2023–24	Russian Premier League	20	3	2	0	–		–		–		22	3
Rubin Kazan	Total		46	3	2	0	–		–		–		48	3
Kairat	2024	Kazakhstan Premier League	13	2	–		4	0	–		–		17	2
Kairat	2025	Kazakhstan Premier League	20	3	2	0	0	0	10 (Note: Appearances in UEFA Champions League)	0	1 (Note: Appearance in Kazakhstan Super Cup)	0	33	3
Kairat	2026	Kazakhstan Premier League	23	2	0	0	0	0	8 (Note: Six appearances in UEFA Champions League, one appearance in UEFA Europa League, one appearance in UEFA Conference League)	0	1	0	32	2
Kairat	Total		56	7	2	0	4	0	18	0	2	0	82	7
Career total			435	19	33	0	4	0	67	1	1	0	540	20

=== International ===
As of match played 12 October 2025

Belarus
Year	Apps	Goals
2009	1	0
2010	10	2
2011	9	0
2012	7	0
2013	8	0
2014	7	0
2015	5	0
2016	7	0
2017	2	0
2018	7	0
2019	8	0
2020	4	0
2021	0	0
2022	0	0
2023	0	0
2024	5	0
2025	4	0
Total	84	2

Statistics accurate as of match played 12 October 2025

International goals

#	Date	Venue	Opponent	Score	Result	Competition
1	17 November 2010	Seeb Stadium, Seeb, Oman	Oman	1–0	4–0	Friendly
2	17 November 2010	Seeb Stadium, Seeb, Oman	Oman	2–0	4–0	Friendly

== Honours ==
Kairat

- Kazakhstan Premier League: 2024, 2025
- Kazakhstan Super Cup: 2025
