= Jug Stanojev =

Serbian footballer (born 1999)

Personal information
- Date of birth: 29 July 1999 (age 27)
- Place of birth: Novi Sad, FR Yugoslavia
- Height: 1.75 m (5 ft 9 in)
- Positions: Winger; full-back

Team information
- Current team: Universitatea Cluj
- Number: 33

Youth career
- –2017: Vojvodina
- 2017–2018: Red Star Belgrade

Senior career*
Years	Team	Apps	(Gls)
2018–2020	Red Star Belgrade	0	(0)
2018–2020	→ Grafičar Beograd (loan)	60	(17)
2020–2023	TSC	79	(7)
2023–2024	Spartak Subotica	31	(1)
2024–2026	Kairat	33	(3)
2026–	Universitatea Cluj	25	(2)

International career
2016	Serbia U17	1	(1)
2013–2016	Serbia U18	1	(0)
2017–2018	Serbia U19	5	(1)
- * Club domestic league appearances and goals as of 7 November 2026

Jug Stanojev (Serbian Cyrillic: Југ Станојев; born 29 July 1999) is a Serbian professional footballer who plays as a winger or a full-back for Liga I club Universitatea Cluj.

== Career statistics ==
As of 7 November 2026

Appearances and goals by club, season and competition
Club	Season	League			National Cup (Note: Includes Serbian Cup, Kazakhstan Cup, Cupa României)		Europe		Other		Total	
Club	Season	Division	Apps	Goals	Apps	Goals	Apps	Goals	Apps	Goals	Apps	Goals
Grafičar Beograd (loan)	2017–18	Serbian League Belgrade	9	1	—		—		—		9	1
Grafičar Beograd (loan)	2018–19	Serbian League Belgrade	22	9	0	0	—		—		22	9
Grafičar Beograd (loan)	2019–20	Serbian First League	29	7	0	0	—		—		29	7
Grafičar Beograd (loan)	Total		60	17	0	0	—		—		60	17
TSC	2020–21	Serbian SuperLiga	29	5	3	0	0	0	—		32	5
TSC	2021–22	Serbian SuperLiga	34	1	3	0	—		—		37	1
TSC	2022–23	Serbian SuperLiga	16	1	2	0	—		—		18	1
TSC	Total		79	7	8	0	0	0	—		87	7
Spartak Subotica	2023–24	Serbian SuperLiga	31	1	1	0	—		—		32	1
Kairat	2024	Kazakhstan Premier League	11	0	—		—		3 (Note: Appearances in Kazakhstan League Cup)	0	14	0
Kairat	2025	Kazakhstan Premier League	22	3	2	0	8 (Note: Appearances in UEFA Champions League)	0	1 (Note: Appearance in Kazakhstan Super Cup)	0	33	3
Kairat	2026	Kazakhstan Premier League	—		—		1	0	—		1	0
Kairat	Total		33	3	2	0	9	0	4	0	48	3
Universitatea Cluj	2025–26	Liga I	16	2	4	0	—		—		20	2
Universitatea Cluj	2026–27	Liga I	9	0	1	0	4 (Note: Two appearances in UEFA Europa League, two appearances in UEFA Conference League)	0	1 (Note: Appearances in Supercupa României)	0	15	0
Universitatea Cluj	Total		25	2	5	0	4	0	1	0	35	2
Career total			228	30	16	0	13	0	5	0	262	30

== Honours ==
Grafičar Beograd

- Serbian League Belgrade: 2018–19

Kairat

- Kazakhstan Premier League: 2024, 2025
- Kazakhstan Super Cup: 2025

Universitatea Cluj

- Cupa României runner-up: 2025–26
- Supercupa României runner-up: 2026
