= Giorgi Zaria =

Georgian footballer

Personal information
- Date of birth: 14 July 1997 (age 29)
- Place of birth: Kutaisi, Georgia
- Height: 1.78 m (5 ft 10 in)
- Position: Midfielder

Team information
- Current team: Aktobe
- Number: 77

Senior career*
Years	Team	Apps	(Gls)
2014	Sasco Tbilisi	6	(4)
2015–2020	Dinamo Tbilisi	66	(6)
2021–2023	Dinamo Batumi	87	(14)
2024–2025	Kairat	41	(11)
2026	Dinamo Tbilisi	9	(0)
2026–	Aktobe	13	(2)

International career^{‡}
2016–2017	Georgia U-21	2	(1)
2021–	Georgia	2	(0)
- * Club domestic league appearances and goals as of 1 November 2026 ‡ National team caps and goals as of 25 March 2025

Giorgi Zaria (Georgian: გიორგი ზარია; born 14 July 1997) is a Georgian professional footballer who plays for Aktobe as a midfielder. He is the five-time winner of the top Georgian league. Zaria has also won the Kazakhstan Premier League.

== Club career ==
Zaria took first steps in professional football at second-division club Sasco in 2013. He drew interest from Dinamo Tbilisi where he spent next six seasons. Zaria netted his first top-league goal in a 1–0 away win over Torpedo Kutaisi on 26 November 2016.

In late December 2020, Zaria signed a three-year contract with Dinamo Batumi. During this period he twice won the champion's titles. Also, the Erovnuli Liga recognized Zaria's individual performance in 2023 by naming him in Team of the Season.

At the end of this season, he moved to Kazakhstan Premier League club Kairat on a deal until the end of 2025. Zaria opened his goal scoring account in the very first game of the season with a long-range strike against Kyzylzhar, which helped his new team snatch a narrow victory. On the last matchday, he converted from the spot against Atyrau which turned out not only a game winner but also a title decider in favour of Kairat. Overall, Zaria contributed to his new club with six goals and four assists. Apart from being included in Team of the Year, he was named Midfielder of the Year and best new player of the season.

On 6 March 2026, Zaria re-signed for Dinamo Tbilisi.

== International career ==
Zaria made his debut for the Georgia national team on 5 September 2021 in a 2022 World Cup qualifier against Spain. He started the game and was substituted after 57 minutes.

== Career statistics ==
=== Club ===
As of match played 30 May 2026

Appearances and goals by club, season and competition
Club	Season	League			National cup		Continental		Other		Total	
Club	Season	Division	Apps	Goals	Apps	Goals	Apps	Goals	Apps	Goals	Apps	Goals
Sasco Tbilisi	2013–14	Pirveli Liga	6	4	0	0	0	0	0	0	6	4
Dinamo Tbilisi	2015–16	Umaglesi/ Erovnuli Liga	0	0	0	0	0	0	0	0	0	0
Dinamo Tbilisi	2016	Umaglesi/ Erovnuli Liga	9	2	1	0	2 (Note: Appearances in UEFA Youth League)	0	0	0	12	2
Dinamo Tbilisi	2017	Umaglesi/ Erovnuli Liga	20	2	3	0	0	0	0	0	23	2
Dinamo Tbilisi	2018	Umaglesi/ Erovnuli Liga	9	0	1	0	0	0	0	0	10	0
Dinamo Tbilisi	2019	Umaglesi/ Erovnuli Liga	22	1	1	0	2 (Note: Appearances in UEFA Europa League)	1	0	0	25	2
Dinamo Tbilisi	2020	Umaglesi/ Erovnuli Liga	6	1	0	0	2	0	0	0	8	1
Dinamo Tbilisi	Total		66	6	6	0	6	1	0	0	78	7
Dinamo Batumi	2021	Erovnuli Liga	26	4	4	0	4 (Note: Appearances in UEFA Europa Conference League)	1	0	0	34	5
Dinamo Batumi	2022	Erovnuli Liga	28	1	1	0	1	0	1 (Note: Appearances in Georgian Super Cup)	0	31	1
Dinamo Batumi	2023	Erovnuli Liga	33	9	4	0	2	0	2	0	41	9
Dinamo Batumi	Total		87	14	9	0	7	1	3	0	106	15
Kairat	2024	Kazakhstan Premier League	23	6	2	0	0	0	1 (Note: Appearance in Kazakhstan League Cup)	1	26	7
Kairat	2025	Kazakhstan Premier League	18	5	2	0	8 (Note: Appearances in UEFA Champions League)	0	1 (Note: Appearances in Kazakhstan Super Cup)	0	29	5
Kairat	Total		41	11	4	0	8	0	2	1	55	12
Dinamo Tbilisi	2026	Erovnuli Liga	9	0	0	0	0	0	0	0	9	0
Career total			209	35	19	0	21	2	5	1	254	38

=== International ===
As of match played 23 March 2025

Appearances and goals by national team and year
National team	Year	Apps	Goals
Georgia	2021	1	0
Georgia	2025	1	0
Total		2	0
