= Luka Gadrani =

Georgian footballer

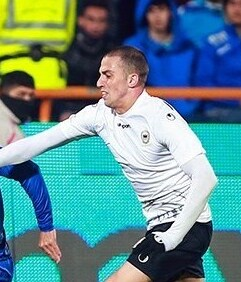

Personal information
- Date of birth: 12 April 1997 (age 29)
- Place of birth: Tbilisi, Georgia
- Height: 1.85 m (6 ft 1 in)
- Position: Defender

Team information
- Current team: Beitar Jerusalem
- Number: 44

Youth career
- WIT Georgia
- 2015–2016: Dinamo Tbilisi

Senior career*
Years	Team	Apps	(Gls)
2016–2017	Alavés B		
2017–2018	Tskhinvali	46	(3)
2018–2019	Rustavi	25	(0)
2019–2020	Shahin Bushehr	18	(0)
2021	Valmiera	26	(0)
2022	Taraz	21	(1)
2023	Aktobe	22	(3)
2024–2025	Kairat	18	(1)
2025–	Beitar Jerusalem	30	(1)

International career^{‡}
2026–	Georgia	1	(0)
- * Club domestic league appearances and goals as of 23 June 2026 ‡ National team caps and goals as of 27 March 2026

Luka Gadrani (Georgian: ლუკა გადრანი; born 12 April 1997) is a Georgian professional footballer who plays for Israeli Premier League club Beitar Jerusalem and the Georgia national team.

== Club career ==
Gadrani started his career at WIT Georgia and Dinamo Tbilisi academy before moving to the reserve team of Spanish second-division club Alaves in the second half of 2015.

Gadrani joined the Georgian second-tier side Tskhinvali in 2017 and on 8 September scored his first senior goal in a 4–0 win over Samgurali. Starting from the next summer, he played for top-division team Rustavi.

In 2019, Gadrani signed for Shahin Bushehr in the Iranian Persian Gulf Pro League, where he made fourteen league appearances. Following the COVID-19 outbreak, Gadrani left Iran to sign for Latvian club FK Valmiera. In 2021, he made his debut in UEFA Conference league and won the silver medals of the top Latvian football league.

In early 2022, Gadrani moved to Kazakhstan. After one season spent at Taraz, he signed with vice-champions Aktobe. He netted three goals in 22 league matches for the latter. Following the 2023 season, Gadrani was named by two analytical websites as Defender of the Year and included in Team of the Season.

On 15 November 2023, Kairat Almaty announced signing a two-year contract with Gadrani. A year later he won his first top-league trophy.

== International career ==
In early September 2024, Gadrani received a first call-up to the Georgia national team for the upcoming UEFA National League matches against the Czech Republic and Albania.

== Career statistics ==
As of match played 10 November 2024

Appearances and goals by club, season and competition
Club	Season	League			National cup		Continental		Other		Total	
Club	Season	Division	Apps	Goals	Apps	Goals	Apps	Goals	Apps	Goals	Apps	Goals
Tskhinvali	2017	Erovnuli Liga 2	29	2	0	0	0	0	0	0	29	2
Tskhinvali	2018	Erovnuli Liga 2	17	1	0	0	0	0	0	0	17	1
Tskhinvali	Total		46	3	0	0	0	0	0	0	46	3
Rustavi	2018	Erovnuli Liga	8	0	0	0	0	0	0	0	8	0
Rustavi	2019	Erovnuli Liga	17	0	1	0	0	0	0	0	18	0
Rustavi	Total		25	0	1	0	0	0	0	0	26	0
Shahin Bushehr	2019/20	Persian Gulf Pro League	18	0	0	0	0	0	0	0	18	0
Valmiera	2020	Latvian Higher League	8	0	2	0	0	0	0	0	10	0
Valmiera	2021	Latvian Higher League	18	0	1	0	1	0	0	0	20	0
Valmiera	Total		26	0	3	0	1	0	0	0	30	0
Taraz	2022	Kazakhstan Premier League	21	1	6	2	0	0	0	0	27	3
Aktobe	2023	Kazakhstan Premier League	22	3	1	0	3	0	0	0	26	3
Kairat	2024	Kazakhstan Premier League	15	1	1	1	0	0	0	0	16	2
Career total			173	8	12	3	4	0	0	0	183	11

== Honours ==
Valmiera

- Latvian Higher League runner-up: 2021

Kairat

- Kazakhstan Premier League: 2024
