= Rafael Urazbakhtin =

Kazakhstani footballer (born 1978)

Personal information
- Full name: Rafael Radikovich Urazbakhtin
- Date of birth: 20 November 1978 (age 47)
- Place of birth: Alma-Ata, Kazakh SSR, Soviet Union
- Height: 5 ft 11 in (1.80 m)
- Position: Forward

Team information
- Current team: Kairat (manager)

Senior career*
Years	Team	Apps	(Gls)
1996	Kainar Taldykorgan	22	(1)
1997	FC Ulytau	9	(0)
1997–2000	Kairat	40	(9)
2001	Rostov	13	(0)
2002	Yelimay Semey	0	(0)
2003–2004	Aktobe	40	(9)
2005	Zhetysu	20	(2)
2006	Shakhter Karagandy	29	(0)
2007	Esil-Bogatyr Petropavl	23	(4)
2008	Kairat	19	(1)
2009	Kaisar	12	(1)
2010–2011	Vostok	49	(10)
Total		236	(36)

International career
1999	Kazakhstan U23	1	(0)
1998–2004	Kazakhstan	12	(2)

Managerial career
- 2024: Kairat (caretaker)
- 2024–: Kairat
- * Club domestic league appearances and goals

Rafael Radikovich Urazbakhtin (Russian: Рафаэль Радикович Уразбахтин; born 20 November 1978) is a Kazakh professional football manager and former player who played as a forward. He is currently in charge of Kazakhstan Premier League club Kairat. He played for ten different clubs during his fifteen-year career, and made twelve appearances for the Kazakhstan national team between 1998 and 2004. He spent the vast majority of his career in Kazakhstan, but left the country in 2001 to play for Rostov in Russia.

== Club career ==
=== Early career ===
Urazbakhtin began his career in 1996 with FC Zhetysu, then known as FC Kainar. That season, the club were relegated from the Kazakhstan Premier League after finishing in ninth place, with Urazbakhtin scoring once in twenty-two appearances. This relegation caused the forward to move to FC Ulytau. However, he only managed to make nine appearances for his new club before Ulytau folded and Urazbakhtin was forced to look for his third team in just two years. He joined FC Kairat, based in Almaty. The club finished third in the Kazakhstan Premier League in 1997, with Urazbakhtin scoring four times in seventeen games. He would spend a total of four years at FC Kairat and 1998 proved to be his most successful year at the club. He scored five goals in fifteen appearances as Kairat finished second in the Kazakhstan First Division. Despite this, Urazbakhtin gradually fell out of favour, only making one appearance in 2000, his final year in Almaty. However, he would return to the club in 2008.

=== 2001–2011 ===
He signed for FC Rostov ahead of the 2001 season and played thirteen games as they finished twelfth in the Russian Premier League. Urazbakhtin then moved back to Kazakhstan to play for Yelimay Semey, now known as FC Spartak Semey. However, he failed to make a single appearance for the side as they finished eighth in the Kazakhstan Premier League. This lack of first-team football understandably lead Urazbakhtin to move to FC Aktobe in 2003. Aktobe had only recently been promoted from the First Division, but this didn't stop Urazbakhtin enjoying the most successful season of his career, netting nine goals in twenty-four games for an average of more than one goal every three games. Aktobe finished fifth in the 2003 Kazakhstan Premier League and improved on this in 2004, claiming fourth place. However, Urazbakhtin failed to emulate his success in the previous campaign, making sixteen appearances but failing to find the net. As a result, he was transferred to FC Zhetysu, the club where he had begun his career. He scored twice in twenty games in 2005 as Zhetysu finished fifteenth in the Premier League, before moving on to FC Shakhter Karagandy. He failed to score for Shakhter in twenty-nine appearances in 2006, despite becoming a regular first-teamer at the club. In 2007, Urazbakhtin joined FC Kyzylzhar, where he witnessed a return to form, scoring four times in twenty-three appearances. However, this didn't prevent the forward from rejoining former club FC Kairat in 2008, and he only managed one goal in nineteen games for his new club, before moving on to the similarly-named FC Kaisar in 2009. Kaiser struggled that season, finishing thirteenth in the Premier League, and Urazbakhtin only scored once in twelve games. Despite being the penultimate season in his career, Urazbakhtin reached the twilight of his career in 2010, scoring once every three games on average for FC Vostok and equalling his best season goal tally. He stayed with Vostok for the 2011 season, but could only manage one goal in twenty-two games before retiring in October.

== International career ==
Urazbakhtin made his debut for Kazakhstan in a 2–0 loss to Iran in December 1998 in the 1998 Asian Games, while he was playing for FC Kairat. He would also play in Asian Games matches against Thailand and Lebanon, coming on as a second-half substitute in all three games. Rafael had to wait until April 2001 for his next international call-up, playing against Nepal in a 2002 FIFA World Cup qualifier and scoring Kazakhstan's third goal in a 6–0 win. He also played in 2002 World Cup qualifiers against Macau and Iraq, before again scoring against Nepal in the return fixture on 21 April. The striker's final three caps for Kazakhstan came in 2006 FIFA World Cup qualifiers against Ukraine in September, Albania in October, and Greece in November.

Urazbakhtin played his last game for Kazakhstan in the 3–1 loss to Greece on 17 November 2004.

On 3 October 1999, Urazbakhtin played in a 2000 Sydney Olympics second-round qualifier against Thailand, coming on as a substitute in a 0–0 draw. As the game was a qualifier for an Olympics tournament, Kazakhstan sent their under-23 team to compete, and as Urazbakhtin was only 20 years old at the time, he was called up to the under-23 side.

== Coaching career ==
Urazbakhtin began his managerial tenure with FC Kairat after progressing through the club's coaching structure. He was appointed head coach in September 2024 and led the club to the league title in the 2025 season. During his tenure, Kairat recorded a victory over Celtic in the UEFA Champions League qualifying rounds, a result that secured qualification for the UEFA Champions League for the first time in the club's history.

== Career statistics ==
International matches

Cap	Date	Venue	Opponent	Result	Competition	Goals
1	1 December 1998	Main Stadium, Bangkok	Iraq	L 2–0	1998 Asian Games	
2	8 December 1998	Rajamangala Stadium, Bangkok	Thailand	D 1–1	1998 Asian Games	
3	12 December 1998	Rajamangala Stadium, Bangkok	Lebanon	L 3–0	1998 Asian Games	
4	12 April 2001	Al-Shaab Stadium, Baghdad	Nepal	W 6–0	2002 FIFA World Cup qualification	1
5	14 April 2001	Al-Shaab Stadium, Baghdad	Macau	W 3–0	2002 FIFA World Cup qualification	
6	16 April 2001	Al-Shaab Stadium, Baghdad	Iraq	D 1–1	2002 FIFA World Cup qualification	
7	21 April 2001	Almaty Central Stadium, Almaty	Nepal	W 4–0	2002 FIFA World Cup qualification	1
8	23 April 2001	Almaty Central Stadium, Almaty	Macau	W 5–0	2002 FIFA World Cup qualification	
9	25 April 2001	Almaty Central Stadium, Almaty	Iraq	D 1–1	2002 FIFA World Cup qualification	
10	8 September 2004	Almaty Central Stadium, Almaty	Ukraine	L 2–1	2006 FIFA World Cup qualification	
11	13 October 2004	Almaty Central Stadium, Almaty	Albania	L 1–0	2006 FIFA World Cup qualification	
12	17 November 2004	Karaiskakis Stadium, Piraeus	Greece	L 3–1	2006 FIFA World Cup qualification	

== Manager statistics ==
As of match played 27 August 2026

Managerial record by team and tenure
Team	Nat	From	To	Record								Ref
Team	Nat	From	To	G	W	D	L	GF	GA	GD	Win %	Ref
Kairat (caretaker)	(Kazakhstan)	29 April 2024	29 May 2024	5	3	1	1	14	4	+10	60.00	
Kairat	(Kazakhstan)	6 September 2024	Present	83	46	16	21	134	81	+53	55.42	
Total				88	49	17	22	148	85	+63	55.68	—
