= Valery Gromyko =

Belarusian footballer (born 1997)

Personal information
- Full name: Valery Igorevich Gromyko
- Date of birth: 23 January 1997 (age 29)
- Place of birth: Minsk, Belarus
- Height: 1.77 m (5 ft 10 in)
- Position: Midfielder

Team information
- Current team: Maxline Vitebsk
- Number: 55

Youth career
- –2014: Minsk

Senior career*
Years	Team	Apps	(Gls)
2015–2017	Minsk	67	(4)
2018–2019	Shakhtyor Soligorsk	19	(4)
2020–2021	Arsenal Tula	19	(0)
2021	→ BATE Borisov (loan)	8	(2)
2022–2023	BATE Borisov	44	(13)
2023	Torpedo Moscow	10	(0)
2024	Kaisar	10	(5)
2024–2026	Kairat	35	(5)
2026–	Maxline Vitebsk	11	(2)

International career^{‡}
2015	Belarus U-18	5	(1)
2015	Belarus U-19	4	(1)
2015–2018	Belarus U-21	15	(1)
2019–	Belarus	37	(4)
- * Club domestic league appearances and goals as of 4 July 2026 ‡ National team caps and goals as of 3 October 2026

Valery Igorevich Gromyko (Belarusian: Валерый Ігаравіч Грамыка Valiery Hramyka; Russian: Валерий Игоревич Громыко; born 23 January 1997) is a Belarusian professional footballer who plays as a midfielder for Maxline Vitebsk and the Belarus national team.

== Club career ==
On 15 January 2020, Gromyko signed a 3.5-year contract with Russian Premier League club FC Arsenal Tula.

On 30 June 2021, he joined BATE Borisov on loan until the end of 2021. On 28 February 2022, he joined BATE on a permanent basis until the end of 2022.

On 4 July 2024, Kazakhstan Premier League club Kairat announced the signing of Gromyko on a contract until the end of the 2025 season. On 29 January 2026, Kairat announced that Gromyko had left the club following the expiration of his contract.

== International career ==
Gromyko made his Belarus national team debut on 8 June 2019 in a Euro 2020 qualifier against Germany, as a starter.

== Career statistics ==
=== Club ===
As of match played 4 July 2026

Appearances and goals by club, season and competition
Club	Season	League			National cup (Note: Includes Belarusian Cup, Russian Cup, Kazakhstan Cup)		League cup		Continental		Other		Total	
Club	Season	Division	Apps	Goals	Apps	Goals	Apps	Goals	Apps	Goals	Apps	Goals	Apps	Goals
Minsk	2015	Belarusian Premier League	19	1	6	0	—		—		—		25	1
Minsk	2016	Belarusian Premier League	24	0	4	0	—		—		—		28	0
Minsk	2017	Belarusian Premier League	24	3	1	0	—		—		—		25	3
Minsk	Total		67	4	11	0	0	0	0	0	0	0	78	4
Shakhtyor Soligorsk	2018	Belarusian Premier League	9	0	6	1	—		0	0	—		15	1
Shakhtyor Soligorsk	2019	Belarusian Premier League	10	4	1	0	—		3 (Note: Appearance(s) in UEFA Europa League)	1	—		14	5
Shakhtyor Soligorsk	Total		19	4	7	1	0	0	3	1	0	0	29	6
Arsenal Tula	2019–20	Russian Premier League	3	0	0	0	—		—		—		3	0
Arsenal Tula	2020–21	Russian Premier League	16	0	0	0	—		—		—		16	0
Arsenal Tula	Total		19	0	0	0	0	0	0	0	0	0	19	0
BATE Borisov (loan)	2021	Belarusian Premier League	8	2	0	0	—		0	0	0	0	8	2
BATE Borisov	2022	Belarusian Premier League	29	5	6	1	—		2 (Note: Appearance(s) in UEFA Europa Conference League)	0	1 (Note: Appearance(s) in Belarusian Super Cup)	0	38	6
BATE Borisov	2023	Belarusian Premier League	15	8	6	2	—		8 (Note: Four appearances, one goal in UEFA Champions League, Two appearances in UEFA Europa League, Two appearances in UEFA Europa Conference League)	1	—		29	11
BATE Borisov	Total		44	13	12	3	0	0	10	1	1	0	67	17
Torpedo Moscow	2023–24	Russian First League	10	0	1	0	—		—		—		11	0
Kaisar	2024	Kazakhstan Premier League	10	5	1	0	—		—		—		11	5
Kairat	2024	Kazakhstan Premier League	11	1	0	0	3	0	—		—		14	1
Kairat	2025	Kazakhstan Premier League	24	4	2	0	0	0	14 (Note: Appearances in UEFA Champions League)	1	—		40	5
Kairat	2026	Kazakhstan Premier League	0	0	0	0	0	0	2	0	—		2	0
Kairat	Total		35	5	2	0	3	0	16	1	0	0	56	6
Maxline Vitebsk	2026	Belarusian Premier League	11	2	4	0	—		1	1	1	0	16	2
Career total			224	35	38	4	3	0	30	4	2	0	297	42

=== International ===
As of match played 3 October 2026

Appearances and goals by national team and year
National team	Year	Apps	Goals
Belarus	2019	1	0
Belarus	2020	1	0
Belarus	2021	0	0
Belarus	2022	9	1
Belarus	2023	2	0
Belarus	2024	8	1
Belarus	2025	9	2
Belarus	2026	7	0
Total		37	4

Scores and results list Belarus goal tally first, score column indicates score after each Gromyko goal.

List of international goals scored by Valery Gromyko
No.	Date	Venue	Opponent	Score	Result	Competition
1	26 March 2022	Khalifa Sports City Stadium, Isa Town, Bahrain	India	3–0	3–0	Friendly
2	8 September 2024	Stade de Luxembourg, Luxembourg City, Luxembourg	Luxembourg	1–0	1–0	2024–25 UEFA Nations League
3	5 June 2025	Borisov Arena, Barysaw, Belarus	Kazakhstan	1–0	4–1	Friendly
4	15 November 2025	Parken Stadium, Copenhagen, Denmark	Denmark	1–1	2–2	2026 FIFA World Cup qualification

== Honours ==
Shakhtyor Soligorsk

- Belarusian Cup: 2018–19

BATE Borisov

- Belarusian Super Cup: 2022
