= Élder Santana =

Brazilian footballer (born 1993)

Personal information
- Full name: Élder Santana Conceição
- Date of birth: 7 April 1993 (age 33)
- Place of birth: Vera Cruz, Brazil
- Height: 1.86 m (6 ft 1 in)
- Position: Forward

Team information
- Current team: Zhenis
- Number: 93

Senior career*
Years	Team	Apps	(Gls)
2012–2013	Morrinhos	10	(2)
2013–2014	Atlético Mineiro	3	(0)
2014–2015	Tupi	21	(2)
2015–2016	Ferroviária	18	(4)
2016–2017	RB Bragantino	15	(0)
2017	Ferroviária	12	(0)
2017–2019	Atlético Mineiro	2	(0)
2018	→ Atlético Goianiense (loan)	11	(1)
2018	→ Botafogo SP (loan)	13	(0)
2019	→ Sertãozinho (loan)	9	(0)
2019–2021	Sanjoanense	44	(16)
2021–2023	Gil Vicente	26	(2)
2023	Aktobe	26	(4)
2024–2025	Kairat	24	(2)
2026–	Zhenis	23	(1)
- * Club domestic league appearances and goals as of 1 November 2026

Élder Santana Conceição (born 7 April 1993) is a Brazilian professional footballer who plays as a forward, for the Kazakhstan Premier League club Zhenis.

== Career ==
Santana began his senior career with Morrinhos, and moved to Atlético Mineiro in 2013. He made his professional debut with Atlético Mineiro in a 4–1 Campeonato Brasileiro Série A loss to Cruzeiro on 27 July 2013. He then had stints with the Brazilian clubs Tupi, Ferroviária, and RB Bragantino before returning to Atlético Mineiro in 2017. Santana moved to Portugal in 2019 with Sanjoanense, and on 25 June 2021 moved to the Primeira Liga club Gil Vicente.

On 10 February 2023, Santana joined Aktobe in Kazakhstan.

On 16 November 2023, Kairat announced the signing of Santana on a contract until the end of 2024. On 5 January 2026, Kairat announced that Santana had left the club after his contract had expired.

On 30 March 2026, Zhenis announced the signing of Santana.
