= 2026 FC Tobol season =

FC Tobol
2026 season
- Chairman: Nikolay Panin
- Manager: Nurbol Zhumaskaliyev (until 21 April); Miroslav Romashchenko (from 22 April)
- Stadium: Central Stadium
- Premier League: 7th
- Kazakhstan Cup: Quarter-final vs Kaisar
- UEFA Conference League: Third Qualifying Round vs Partizan
- Top goalscorer: League: Uroš Milovanović (11); All: Uroš Milovanović (13)
- Highest home attendance: 7,489 vs Ordabasy (23 May 2026)
- Lowest home attendance: 2,000 vs Zhenis (17 October 2026)
- Average home league attendance: 3,237 (31 October 2026)
Home colours	Away colours	Third colours

The 2026 FC Tobol season was the 28th successive season that the club played in the Kazakhstan Premier League, the highest tier of association football in Kazakhstan.

== Season events ==
On 30 December 2025, Tobol announced the return to the club of Aleksandr Marochkin from Astana.

On 5 January, Tobol announced the signing of Amine Talal from Akhmat Grozny.

On 12 January, Tobol announced the signing of Damir Marat from Okzhetpes.

On 16 January, Tobol announced the signing of Dauren Zhumat from Okzhetpes.

On 23 January, Tobol announced the signing of Luis Guerra from Deportes Limache.

On 4 February, Tobol announced the signing of Abdoulaye Cissé from Novi Pazar.

On 5 February, Tobol announced the signing of Rubin Hebaj from Sogdiana.

On 9 February, Tobol announced the signing of Maksim Myakish from Dinamo Minsk.

On 25 February, Tobol announced the signing of Uroš Milovanović from Chaves.

On 27 February, Tobol announced the signing of Kirill Glushchenkov from Pari Nizhny Novgorod.

On 21 April, Nurbol Zhumaskaliyev resigned as the head coach of Tobol. The following day, 22 April, Tobol announced Miroslav Romashchenko as their new head coach.

On 2 June, Tobol announced the signing of Rayan Senhadji from Sumgayit.

On 14 June, Tobol announced the signing of Antonio Boršić from NK Varaždin.

On 28 June, Tobol announced the signing of Islam Chesnokov from Heart of Midlothian, on a contract until the end of 2028.

On 31 July, Tobol announced the signing of Vitaly Lisakovich from Torpedo-BelAZ Zhodino.

On 18 August, Islam Chesnokov joined Krylia Sovetov on a year-long loan, with the option to make the move permanent.

== Squad ==
As of match played 31 October 2026

No.	Name	Nationality	Position	Date of birth (age)	Signed from	Signed in	Contract ends	Apps.	Goals
Goalkeepers
1	Sultan Busurmanov	(Kazakhstan)	GK	10 May 1996 (aged 30)	Academy	2015		66	0
35	Yuri Melikhov	(Kazakhstan)	GK	1 September 2003 (aged 23)	Academy	2021		2	0
44	Danil Ustimenko	(Kazakhstan)	GK	8 August 2000 (aged 26)	Kairat	2025		35	0
Defenders
3	Roman Asrankulov	(Kazakhstan)	DF	30 July 1999 (aged 27)	Academy	2018		134	5
4	Nemanja Cavnić	(Montenegro)	DF	5 September 1995 (aged 31)	Željezničar Sarajevo	2025		34	2
5	Pape-Alioune Ndiaye	(France)	DF	4 February 1998 (aged 28)	Şanlıurfaspor	2024		83	1
15	Marko Vukčević	(Montenegro)	DF	7 June 1993 (aged 33)	Borac Banja Luka	2025		35	5
22	Aleksandr Marochkin	(Kazakhstan)	DF	14 February 1990 (aged 36)	Astana	2026		97	2
25	Antonio Boršić	(Croatia)	DF	19 September 1995 (aged 31)	NK Varaždin	2026		16	0
33	Ivan Pivovarov	(Kazakhstan)	DF	4 March 2007 (aged 19)	Academy	2025		2	0
38	Amanzhol Bakitzhanov	(Kazakhstan)	DF	24 December 2007 (aged 18)	Academy	2025		6	0
72	Rayan Senhadji	(France)	DF	13 June 1997 (aged 29)	Sumgayit	2026		17	2
Midfielders
6	Maksim Myakish	(Belarus)	MF	3 March 2000 (aged 26)	Dinamo Minsk	2026		30	1
8	Askhat Tagybergen	(Kazakhstan)	MF	9 August 1990 (aged 36)	Ordabasy	2025		111	21
13	Abdoulaye Cissé	(Guinea)	MF	13 February 1996 (aged 30)	Novi Pazar	2026		23	0
14	Amine Talal	(Morocco)	MF	5 June 1996 (aged 30)	Akhmat Grozny	2026		26	5
17	Aleksandr Zuyev	(Kazakhstan)	MF	26 June 1996 (aged 30)	Arsenal Tula	2024		73	11
19	Dauren Zhumat	(Kazakhstan)	MF	2 March 1999 (aged 27)	Okzhetpes	2026		25	1
21	Nauryzbek Zhagorov	(Kazakhstan)	MF	1 March 1998 (aged 28)	Atyrau	2025		61	1
34	Sultan Bakhytkiriev	(Kazakhstan)	MF	12 December 2004 (aged 21)	Academy	2026		2	0
50	Alibek Zhaylaubaev	(Kazakhstan)	MF	25 March 2006 (aged 20)	Academy	2026		2	0
56	Emin Musayev	(Kazakhstan)	MF	3 November 2006 (aged 19)	Academy	2026		3	0
57	Azamat Zinadin	(Kazakhstan)	MF	9 October 2006 (aged 20)	AKAS Almaty	2026		3	0
88	Meyrambek Kalmyrza	(Kazakhstan)	MF	15 December 2002 (aged 23)	Zhetysu	2025		14	0
	Beybit Galym	(Kazakhstan)	MF	25 October 2004 (aged 22)	Academy	2022		46	3
Forwards
7	Zhaslan Zhumashev	(Kazakhstan)	FW	27 September 2001 (aged 25)	Academy	2020		123	19
18	Uroš Milovanović	(Serbia)	FW	18 October 2000 (aged 26)	Chaves	2026		35	13
30	Luis Guerra	(Venezuela)	FW	20 November 1996 (aged 29)	Deportes Limache	2026		35	6
43	Evgeniy Konyashkin	(Kazakhstan)	FW	13 April 2007 (aged 19)	Academy	2026		1	0
99	Vitaly Lisakovich	(Belarus)	FW	8 February 1998 (aged 28)	Torpedo-BelAZ Zhodino	2026		12	5
Players away on loan
10	Islam Chesnokov	(Kazakhstan)	MF	21 November 1999 (aged 26)	Heart of Midlothian	2026	2028	103	30
11	Damir Marat	(Kazakhstan)	FW	5 November 2000 (aged 25)	Okzhetpes	2026		14	0
Left during the season
26	Kirill Glushchenkov	(Russia)	DF	5 February 2000 (aged 26)	Pari Nizhny Novgorod	2026		7	0
29	Daniyar Usenov	(Kazakhstan)	MF	18 February 2001 (aged 25)	Kairat	2025		5	0
99	Rubin Hebaj	(Albania)	FW	30 July 1998 (aged 28)	Sogdiana	2026		10	2

== Transfers ==
=== In ===
Date	Position	Nationality	Name	From	Fee	Ref.
30 December 2025	DF	(Kazakhstan)	Aleksandr Marochkin	Astana	Undisclosed	
5 January 2026	MF	(Morocco)	Amine Talal	Akhmat Grozny	Undisclosed	
12 January 2026	FW	(Kazakhstan)	Damir Marat	Okzhetpes	Undisclosed	
16 January 2026	MF	(Kazakhstan)	Dauren Zhumat	Okzhetpes	Undisclosed	
23 January 2026	FW	(Venezuela)	Luis Guerra	Deportes Limache	Undisclosed	
4 February 2026	DF	(Guinea)	Abdoulaye Cissé	Novi Pazar	Undisclosed	
5 February 2026	FW	(Albania)	Rubin Hebaj	Sogdiana	Undisclosed	
25 February 2026	FW	(Serbia)	Uroš Milovanović	Chaves	Undisclosed	
27 February 2026	DF	(Russia)	Kirill Glushchenkov	Pari Nizhny Novgorod	Undisclosed	
2 June 2026	DF	(France)	Rayan Senhadji	Sumgayit	Undisclosed	
14 June 2026	DF	(Croatia)	Antonio Boršić	NK Varaždin	Undisclosed	
28 June 2026	MF	(Kazakhstan)	Islam Chesnokov	Heart of Midlothian	Undisclosed	
31 July 2026	FW	(Belarus)	Vitaly Lisakovich	Torpedo-BelAZ Zhodino	Undisclosed	

=== Loans out ===
Date from	Position	Nationality	Name	To	Date to	Ref.
18 August 2026	MF	(Kazakhstan)	Islam Chesnokov	Krylia Sovetov	30 June 2027	

=== Released ===
Date	Position	Nationality	Name	Joined	Date	Ref.
16 February 2026	MF	(Georgia (country))	Tsotne Mosiashvili	Zhetysu	5 March 2026	
21 May 2026	FW	(Albania)	Rubin Hebaj	AF Elbasani	9 June 2026	
14 June 2026	DF	(Russia)	Kirill Glushchenkov	Dynamo Brest	23 June 2026	
19 June 2026	MF	(Kazakhstan)	Daniyar Usenov	Caspiy	22 June 2026	

== Friendlies ==
2026	–
(UTC+5)

== Competitions ==
Competition	First match	Last match	Starting round	Final position	Record							
Competition	First match	Last match	Starting round	Final position	Pld	W	D	L	GF	GA	GD	Win %
Premier League	7 March 2026	31 October 2026	Matchday 1	7th	30	12	5	13	42	42	+0	40.00
Kazakhstan Cup	8 April 2026	13 May 2026	Round of 32	Quarter-final	3	2	1	0	11	2	+9	66.67
Super Cup	28 February 2026	28 February 2026	Final	Runnersup	1	0	1	0	2	2	+0	0.00
UEFA Conference League	23 July 2026	13 August 2026	Second qualifying round	Third qualifying round	4	0	2	2	3	7	−4	0.00
Total					38	14	9	15	58	53	+5	36.84

Last updated: 31 October 2026
Source: Competitions

=== Super Cup ===
28 February 2026	Kairat	2–2 (4 – 5 p)	Tobol	Astana
18:00 (UTC+6)	Tapalov (yellow card) 13'; Mrynskiy 20'; Jorginho (penalty missed) 25'; Oksanen 26'; Edmilson (yellow card) 73'	Report	Guerra 6'; Cavnić (yellow card) 24'; Marat (yellow card) 62'; Tagybergen (yellow card) 68' (goal) 89'; Zhumat (yellow card) 82'	Stadium: Astana Arena; Attendance: 15,546; Referee: Denis Tevyashov
	Penalties
	Ricardinho (penalty missed); Oksanen (penalty scored); Kasabulat (penalty scored); Baybek (penalty scored); Satpayev (penalty scored)		(penalty scored) Zhumashev; (penalty scored) Asrankulov; (penalty scored) Tagybergen; (penalty scored) Ndiaye; (penalty scored) Zhumat

=== Premier League ===
==== Results summary ====
Overall								Home						Away					
Pld	W	D	L	GF	GA	GD	Pts	W	D	L	GF	GA	GD	W	D	L	GF	GA	GD
30	12	5	13	42	42	0	41	10	2	3	29	20	+9	2	3	10	13	22	−9

Last updated: 31 October 2026.
Source: See Results

==== Results by round ====
Round	1	2	3	4	5	6	7	8	9	10	11	12	13	14	15	16	17	18	19	20	22	21	24	25	26	27	28	23	29	30
Ground	A	H	A	A	H	A	H	A	H	A	H	A	H	A	H	A	H	A	H	A	A	H	A	H	A	H	H	H	A	H
Result	L	D	L	L	D	L	W	L	W	L	L	D	W	L	W	L	W	D	W	L	W	W	L	W	W	L	W	W	D	L
Position																														

Source: See Results
A = Away; H = Home; W = Win; D = Draw; L = Loss; P = Bye

==== Results ====
7 March 2026 1	Aktobe	4–1	Tobol	Turkistan
17:00 (UTC+5)	Sosah 24'; Zeljković 46'; Dosmagambetov 68'; Ordets 74'; Seydakhmet (yellow card) 75'	Report	Guerra (penalty missed) 32'; Myakish (red card) 39'; Zhumashev 72'	Stadium: Turkistan Arena; Attendance: 5,000; Referee: Bolat Sariev

16 March 2026 2	Tobol	2–2	Zhetysu	Kostanay
17:00 (UTC+5)	Glushchenkov (yellow card) 9'; Milovanović 58'; Zhumashev 60'; Hebaj (yellow card) 90+5'; Cavnić (yellow card) 90+9'	Report	Zivanovic (yellow card) 10'; Muzhikov (yellow card) 57' (goal) 90+7'; Zhakipbayev 67'; Anuarbekov (yellow card) 90+2'	Stadium: Central Stadium; Attendance: 3,000; Referee: Sayat Karabaev

20 March 2026 3	Astana	2–0	Tobol	Astana
19:00 (UTC+5)	Bašić 24' (yellow card) 37'; Karaman (yellow card) 31'; Kasym (penalty missed) 42 66'	Report	Cissé (yellow card) 44'; Tagybergen (yellow card) 80'	Stadium: Astana Arena; Attendance: 9,570; Referee: Sergey Nozhenko

4 April 2026 4	Yelimay	1–0	Tobol	Astana
17:00 (UTC+5)	Ashirbek (yellow card) 72'; Murtazayev 75'	Report	Guerra (yellow card) 17'; Tagybergen (yellow card) 74'; Zhagorov (yellow card) 84'	Stadium: Astana Arena; Attendance: 5,000; Referee: Danil Gorda

11 April 2026 5	Tobol	1–1	Kairat	Kostanay
17:00 (UTC+6)	Milovanović 13'; Guerra (yellow card) 35'; Marochkin (yellow card) 40'; Tagybergen (yellow card) 53'; Zhumashev (yellow card) 56'; Cavnić (yellow card) 73'; Marat (yellow card) 90'	Report	Satpayev 19'; Oksanen (yellow card) 63'	Stadium: Central Stadium; Attendance: 3,000; Referee: Alexander Zatula

19 April 2026 6	Ulytau	2–1	Tobol	Jezkazgan
15:00 (UTC+5)	Martin (yellow card) 15' (red card) 61' (goal) 41'; Smith 50' (pen.)	Report	Milovanović 7' (yellow card) 30'; Marochkin (yellow card) 47'; Guerra (yellow card) 76'	Stadium: Metallurg Stadium; Attendance: 4,000; Referee: Georgy Chekhovsky

26 April 2026 7	Tobol	2–1	Caspiy	Kostanay
16:00 (UTC+5)	Zhumashev 6', 16'; Guerra (yellow card) 62'; Talal (red card) 90+9'	Report	Umayev 39'; Morgado (yellow card) 47'; Aripov (yellow card) 90+7'; Nabikhanov (yellow card) 90+9'	Stadium: Central Stadium; Attendance: 2,500; Referee: Arman Ismuratov

3 May 2026 8	Zhenis	1–0	Tobol	Astana
18:00 (UTC+5)	Imnadze (yellow card) 27'; Gian (yellow card) 59'; Adilov 86'; Šaravanja (yellow card) 90+5'	Report	Asrankulov (yellow card) 61'; Zhumashev (yellow card) 71'	Stadium: Astana Arena; Attendance: 1,500; Referee: Anton Kuchma

9 May 2026 9	Tobol	1–0	Irtysh Pavlodar	Kostanay
20:00 (UTC+5)	Asrankulov (red card) 45+3'; Milovanović 52'; Busurmanov (yellow card) 90'	Report	Agimanov (yellow card) 90'; Turlybek (yellow card) 90'	Stadium: Central Stadium; Attendance: 2,133; Referee: Daniyar Sakhi

17 May 2026 10	Kaisar	2–1	Tobol	Kyzylorda
19:00 (UTC+5)	Abiken 2', 9'; Moses (yellow card) 86'; Kenesbek (yellow card) 90'; Ezekiel (yellow card) 90+2'	Report	Zhumashev 30'; Zhumat (yellow card) 39'	Stadium: Gani Muratbayev Stadium; Attendance: 8,900; Referee: Bulat Sariev

23 May 2026 11	Tobol	0–3	Ordabasy	Kostanay
20:00 (UTC+5)	Glushchenkov (red card) 27'; Milovanović (yellow card) 68'; Zuyev (yellow card) 71'	Report	Kilama (yellow card) 32'; Khalmatov (yellow card) 45+4'; Căpățînă 50'; S.Astanov (yellow card) 52'; Amir 84', 87'	Stadium: Central Stadium; Attendance: 7,489; Referee: Anton Kuchma

28 May 2026 12	Atyrau	1–1	Tobol	Turkistan
18:00 (UTC+5)	Khvalko (yellow card) 62'; Tkachenko (yellow card) 67'; Rabiu 71' (pen.); Trufanov (yellow card) 90+2'	Report	Zuyev 24'	Stadium: Turkistan Arena; Attendance: 150; Referee: Aydin Tasybaev

13 June 2026 13	Tobol	2–0	Kyzylzhar	Kostanay
16:00 (UTC+5)	Cavnić (yellow card) 45+2'; Milovanović 54'; Zuyev 57'; Guerra (yellow card) 75'	Report	Valgushev (yellow card) 28'; Piščević (yellow card) 41'; Makarenko (yellow card) 45+1'; Kozlenko (yellow card) 66'	Stadium: Central Stadium; Attendance: 2,233; Referee: Saken Bayimbet

21 June 2026 14	Okzhetpes	2–1	Tobol	Kokshetau
17:00 (UTC+5)	Mukhametkhanov 48', 65'; Lototskyi (yellow card) 80'	Report	Vukčević 10'; Ndiaye (yellow card) 11' (yellow-red card) 38'; Ustimenko (yellow card) 62'	Stadium: Okzhetpes Stadium; Attendance: 2,250; Referee: Sergey Nozhenko

28 June 2026 15	Tobol	3–1	Altai	Kostanay
18:00 (UTC+5)	Tagybergen 14'; Milovanović (yellow card) 33'; Guerra 73'; Talal 80'	Report	Mićević (yellow card) 13'; Dadaev (yellow card) 71' (yellow-red card) 90+1'; Schmidt (yellow card) 83'	Stadium: Central Stadium; Attendance: 3,500; Referee: Danil Gorda

4 July 2026 16	Altai	1–0	Tobol	Oskemen
17:00 (UTC+5)	Lobjanidze 49'; Dzhanuzakov (yellow card) 77'; Popov (yellow card) 80'	Report	Zhagorov (yellow card) 89'	Stadium: Vostok Stadium; Attendance: 3,500; Referee: Denis Tevyashov

12 July 2026 17	Tobol	3–1	Okzhetpes	Kostanay
17:00 (UTC+5)	Tagybergen 35'; Senhadji 61'; Guerra 64'	Report	Mukhametkhanov (yellow card) 51'; Baradzin 74'	Stadium: Central Stadium; Attendance: 3,500; Referee: Aydin Tasybaev

18 July 2026 18	Kyzylzhar	1–1	Tobol	Petropavl
18:00 (UTC+5)	Latifi 40'; Piščević (yellow card) 81' (yellow-red card) 88'	Report	Zuyev 31'; Chesnokov (yellow card) 71'	Stadium: Karasai Stadium; Attendance: 3,000; Referee: Alexander Zatula

26 July 2026 19	Tobol	1–0	Atyrau	Kostanay
17:00 (UTC+5)	Milovanović 26'; Ndiaye (yellow card) 45+2'; Chesnokov (yellow card) 46'	Report	Khvalko (yellow card) 65'; Kalmuratov (yellow card) 80'; Satanov (yellow card) 83' (yellow-red card) 87'	Stadium: Central Stadium; Attendance: 3,800; Referee: Georgy Chekhovsky

2 August 2026 20	Ordabasy	2–0	Tobol	Shymkent
20:00 (UTC+5)	E.Astanov 19'; Căpățînă (yellow card) 76'; Malyi (yellow card) 87'	Report	Guerra (yellow card) 15'; Zuyev (yellow card) 56'; Cissé (yellow card) 67'; Zhagorov (red card) 77'	Stadium: Kazhymukan Munaitpasov Stadium; Attendance: 12,350; Referee: Danil Gorda

16 August 2026 22	Irtysh Pavlodar	0–2	Tobol	Pavlodar
17:00 (UTC+5)	Opeh (yellow card) 20'; Yudenkov (yellow card) 75' (yellow-red card) 90+3'	Report	Senhadji 23'; Ustimenko (yellow card) 35'; Boršić (yellow card) 42' (yellow-red card) 68'; Lisakovich 52'; Myakish (yellow card) 72'; Cavnić (yellow card) 81'	Stadium: Central Stadium; Attendance: 2,000; Referee: Alexander Zatula

25 August 2026 21	Tobol	3–2	Kaisar	Kostanay
19:00 (UTC+5)	Myakish 4' (yellow card) 43'; Marochkin 27'; Tagybergen (yellow card) 57'; Milovanović 70'; Talal (yellow card) 90+6'	Report	Mukhammed 13', 48'; Myakish 4'; Macedo (yellow card) 81'; Bukorac (yellow card) 84'	Stadium: Central Stadium; Attendance: 2,700; Referee: Sayat Karabaev
Note: Match originally scheduled for 9 August.

30 August 2026 24	Caspiy	1–0	Tobol	Aktau
17:00 (UTC+5)	Amaral (yellow card) 33'; Ndombasi 71'; Epton (yellow card) 76'	Report	Talal (yellow card) 60'; Zuyev (yellow card) 82'	Stadium: Zhastar Stadium; Attendance: 2,500; Referee: Georgy Chekhovsky

6 September 2026 25	Tobol	3–1	Ulytau	Kostanay
18:00 (UTC+5)	Milovanović 16', 90+1'; Lisakovich (yellow card) 20' (goal) 60'; Tagybergen (yellow card) 45+1'; Zuyev (yellow card) 55' Talal (yellow card) 63'	Report	Akhmedov 37'; Carmona (yellow card) 39'; Nurali (yellow card) 72'	Stadium: Central Stadium; Attendance: 3,500; Referee: Ruslan Sultangaliev

13 September 2026 26	Kairat	1–4	Tobol	Almaty
19:00 (UTC+5)	Gual 40' (yellow card) 64'	Report	Milovanović 18', 44'; Myakish (yellow card) 28'; Lisakovich 63'; Guerra 80'	Stadium: Central Stadium; Attendance: 14,379; Referee: Sayat Karabaev

17 September 2026 27	Tobol	0–2	Yelimay	Kostanay
19:00 (UTC+5)		Report	Fessou 16' (pen.); Tanasijević (yellow card) 23'; Mittendorfer (yellow card) 30'; Zhaksylykov 40'; China (yellow card) 68'; Belančić (yellow card) 90+5'	Stadium: Central Stadium; Attendance: 2,500; Referee: Georgy Chekhovsky

10 October 2026 28	Tobol	2–1	Astana	Kostanay
17:00 (UTC+5)	Talal 28'; Lisakovich 61'; Guerra (yellow card) 79'	Report	Marat (yellow card) 45+2'; Bartolec 52'; Karimov (yellow card) 58'; Basmanov (yellow card) 80'; Vorogovsky (yellow card) 90+8'	Stadium: Central Stadium; Attendance: 2,500; Referee: Alexander Zatula

17 October 2026 23	Tobol	4–2	Zhenis	Kostanay
17:00 (UTC+5)	Tursynbay 12' (o.g.); Lisakovich 18'; Tagybergen 33'; Zhumashev 59'; Zhagorov (yellow card) 77'	Report	Kpozo 6'; Filipović 38'; Tursynbay (yellow card) 57'; Tevzadze (yellow card) 69'; Zharynbetov (yellow card) 72'; Imnadze (yellow card) 90+2'	Stadium: Central Stadium; Attendance: 2,000; Referee: Daniyar Sakhi
Note: Match originally scheduled for 23 August.

24 October 2026 29	Zhetysu	1–1	Tobol	Taldykorgan
15:00 (UTC+5)	Baltabekov 14'; Mosiashvili (yellow card) 27'; Orynbasar (yellow card) 90+4'	Report	Lisakovich (yellow card) 41'; Talal 70'	Stadium: Jetisu Stadium; Attendance: 700; Referee: Sayat Sulikanov

31 October 2026 30	Tobol	2–3	Aktobe	Kostanay
15:00 (UTC+5)	Milovanović 48'; Zhumashev 56'; Tagybergen (yellow card) 61'; Zhagorov (yellow card) 65'	Report	Shushenachev 44'; Atanasov (yellow card) 53'; Yerlanov (yellow card) 56' (goal) 90+4'; Ordets 69'; Nani (yellow card) 78'	Stadium: Central Stadium; Attendance: 4,200; Referee: Rustam Omarov

==== League table ====
Pos	Team	Pld	W	D	L	GF	GA	GD	Pts
5	Aktobe	30	14	7	9	47	39	+8	49
6	Elimai	30	12	9	9	43	44	−1	45
7	Tobol	30	12	5	13	42	42	0	41
8	Jenis	30	9	9	12	32	40	−8	36
9	Ulytau	30	9	8	13	27	38	−11	35

Source: UEFA, Soccerway
Rules for classification: 1) Points; 2) Goal difference; 3) Matches won; 4) Goals scored; 5) Away goals scored; 6) Head-to-head points; 7) Head-to-head matches won; 8) Head-to-head goal difference; 9) Head-to-head goals scored; 10) Head-to-head away goals scored; 11) Draw..

=== Kazakhstan Cup ===
8 April 2026 Round of 32	Ansat	0–8	Tobol	Aksu
15:00 (UTC+5)		Report	Zuyev 2'; Hebaj 7', 24'; Zhumashev 10'; Usenov 35'; Guerra 51', 85'; Milovanović 62'	Stadium: Dostyk Stadium; Attendance: 300; Referee: Murodbek Khalilov

29 April 2026 Round of 16	Astana	1–2	Tobol	Astana
18:00 (UTC+5)	Abdurasulov (yellow card) 36'; Karaman (yellow card) 53'; Anuarov 80'	Report	Bakitzhanov (yellow card) 6'; Talal 7'; Usenov (yellow card) 42' (yellow-red card) 45+2'; Zhumashev 87' (pen.)	Stadium: Astana Arena; Attendance: 4,000; Referee: Denis Tevyashov

13 May 2026 Quarter-final	Kaisar	1–1 (a.e.t.) (5–3 p)	Tobol	Kyzylorda
20:00 (UTC+5)	Tolegenov (yellow card) 19'; Sovet (yellow card) 22'; Konlimkos 33'; Cuckić (yellow card) 75'	Report	Marat (yellow card) 15'; Zhumat 78'; Zhagorov (yellow card) 80'; Kalmyrza (yellow card) 99'; Tagybergen (yellow card) 105'; Cissé (yellow card) 114'	Stadium: Gani Muratbayev Stadium; Attendance: 9,127; Referee: Ruslan Sultangaliev
	Penalties
	Abiken (penalty scored); Kaldybekov (penalty scored); Zhumabekov (penalty scored); Askarov (penalty scored); Idrisov (penalty scored)		(penalty scored) Zhumashev; (penalty missed) Zhumat; (penalty scored) Guerra; (penalty scored) Asrankulov

=== UEFA Conference League ===
==== Qualifying rounds ====
23 July 2026 Second qualifying round 1st leg	Panevėžys (Lithuania)	1–1	(Kazakhstan) Tobol	Panevėžys, Lithuania
20:30 (UTC+5)	Paulauskas (yellow card) 22'; Keita 45' (yellow card) 45+2'; Asamoah (yellow card) 58'; Bizoza (yellow card) 63'	Report	Guerra (yellow card) 35'; Tagybergen (penalty missed) 60'; Cavnić 84'; Milovanović (yellow card) 86'	Stadium: Aukštaitija Stadium; Attendance: 1,872; Referee: Mohammad Usman Aslam (Norway)

30 July 2026 Second qualifying round 2nd leg	Tobol (Kazakhstan)	1–1 (2–2 agg.) (3–2 p)	(Lithuania) Panevėžys	Kostanay, Kazakhstan
19:00 (UTC+5)	Myakish (yellow card) 31'; Talal 45+3'; Guerra (yellow card) 90'	Report	Petkevičius 33'; Ramanauskas (yellow card) 34'; Paulauskas (yellow card) 52'; Asamoah (yellow card) 57' van den Bos (yellow card) 118'	Stadium: Central Stadium; Attendance: 5,837; Referee: Denys Shurman (Ukraine)
	Penalties
	Guerra (penalty scored); Cavnić (penalty scored); Tagybergen (penalty scored); Ndiaye (penalty missed); Asrankulov (penalty missed)		(penalty missed) Rasimavičius; (penalty scored) Ramanauskas; (penalty scored) Kurtsev; (penalty missed) Keita; (penalty missed) Bačanin

7 August 2026 Third qualifying round 1st leg	Partizan (Serbia)	3–0	(Kazakhstan) Tobol	Belgrade, Serbia
00:00 (UTC+5)	Aleksić (yellow card) 3'; Seck 32'; Vukotić (yellow card) 44'; Zubairu 64'; Traorè 90+4'; Đurđević (yellow card) 90+8'; Lekić (yellow card) 90+9'	Report	Cissé (yellow card) 86'; Myakish (yellow card) 90+1'	Stadium: Partizan Stadium; Attendance: 10,367; Referee: António Nobre (Portugal)

13 August 2026 Third qualifying round 2nd leg	Tobol (Kazakhstan)	1–2 (1–5 agg.)	(Serbia) Partizan	Kostanay, Kazakhstan
20:00 (UTC+5)	Chesnokov 7'; Cissé (yellow card) 86'	Report	Alilović (yellow card) 40'; Trifunović (yellow card) 44'; Mitrović 47'; Milić (yellow card) 62'; Nwulu (yellow card) 85'; Traorè 90+2'	Stadium: Central Stadium; Attendance: 6,129; Referee: Daniele Chiffi (Italy)

== Squad statistics ==
As of match played 31 October 2026

=== Appearances and goals ===
No.	Pos	Nat	Player	Total		Premier League		Kazakhstan Cup		Super Cup		UEFA Conference League	
No.	Pos	Nat	Player	Apps	Goals	Apps	Goals	Apps	Goals	Apps	Goals	Apps	Goals
1	GK	(Kazakhstan) KAZ	Sultan Busurmanov	17	0	12	0	1+1	0	1	0	2	0
3	DF	(Kazakhstan) KAZ	Roman Asrankulov	27	0	14+7	0	2+1	0	0+1	0	1+1	0
4	DF	(Montenegro) MNE	Nemanja Cavnić	23	1	18+2	0	0	0	1	0	1+1	1
5	DF	(France) FRA	Pape-Alioune Ndiaye	29	0	22+2	0	0	0	1	0	3+1	0
6	MF	(Belarus) BLR	Maksim Myakish	30	1	20+3	1	2+1	0	1	0	2+1	0
7	FW	(Kazakhstan) KAZ	Zhaslan Zhumashev	21	9	12+5	7	1+2	2	0+1	0	0	0
8	MF	(Kazakhstan) KAZ	Askhat Tagybergen	33	4	25+2	3	1	0	1	1	4	0
13	MF	(Guinea) GUI	Abdoulaye Cissé	23	0	9+8	0	1+2	0	0	0	2+1	0
14	MF	(Morocco) MAR	Amine Talal	26	5	16+4	3	2	1	0	0	2+2	1
15	DF	(Montenegro) MNE	Marko Vukčević	8	1	6+1	1	0	0	1	0	0	0
17	MF	(Kazakhstan) KAZ	Aleksandr Zuyev	31	4	11+12	3	3	1	1	0	2+2	0
18	FW	(Serbia) SRB	Uroš Milovanović	36	13	23+6	12	0+2	1	0+1	0	4	0
19	MF	(Kazakhstan) KAZ	Dauren Zhumat	25	1	8+12	0	1+1	1	0+1	0	1+1	0
21	MF	(Kazakhstan) KAZ	Nauryzbek Zhagorov	31	0	20+3	0	0+3	0	1	0	4	0
22	DF	(Kazakhstan) KAZ	Aleksandr Marochkin	18	1	14+1	1	2	0	1	0	0	0
25	DF	(Croatia) CRO	Antonio Boršić	16	0	10+2	0	0	0	0	0	3+1	0
30	FW	(Venezuela) VEN	Luis Guerra	35	6	21+7	3	0+2	2	1	1	2+2	0
33	DF	(Kazakhstan) KAZ	Ivan Pivovarov	1	0	0	0	1	0	0	0	0	0
34	MF	(Kazakhstan) KAZ	Sultan Bakhytkiriev	2	0	1+1	0	0	0	0	0	0	0
35	GK	(Kazakhstan) KAZ	Yuri Melikhov	1	0	0	0	1	0	0	0	0	0
38	DF	(Kazakhstan) KAZ	Amanzhol Bakitzhanov	2	0	1	0	1	0	0	0	0	0
43	FW	(Kazakhstan) KAZ	Evgeniy Konyashkin	1	0	1	0	0	0	0	0	0	0
44	GK	(Kazakhstan) KAZ	Danil Ustimenko	20	0	16	0	1	0	0	0	2+1	0
50	MF	(Kazakhstan) KAZ	Alibek Zhaylaubaev	2	0	0+2	0	0	0	0	0	0	0
56	MF	(Kazakhstan) KAZ	Emin Musayev	3	0	0+2	0	0	0	0	0	0+1	0
57	MF	(Kazakhstan) KAZ	Azamat Zinadin	3	0	0+3	0	0	0	0	0	0	0
72	DF	(France) FRA	Rayan Senhadji	16	2	8+4	2	0	0	0	0	4	0
88	MF	(Kazakhstan) KAZ	Meyrambek Kalmyrza	7	0	2+2	0	3	0	0	0	0	0
99	FW	(Belarus) BLR	Vitaly Lisakovich	12	5	9+1	5	0	0	0	0	1+1	0
Players away from Tobol on loan:
10	MF	(Kazakhstan) KAZ	Islam Chesnokov	11	1	5+2	0	0	0	0	0	4	1
11	FW	(Kazakhstan) KAZ	Damir Marat	14	0	1+9	0	3	0	0+1	0	0	0
Players who left Tobol during the season:
26	DF	(Russia) RUS	Kirill Glushchenkov	7	0	2+2	0	3	0	0	0	0	0
29	MF	(Kazakhstan) KAZ	Daniyar Usenov	5	1	0+3	0	2	1	0	0	0	0
99	FW	(Albania) ALB	Rubin Hebaj	10	2	1+6	0	2	2	1	0	0	0

=== Goal scorers ===
Place	Position	Nation	Number	Name	Premier League	Kazakhstan Cup	Super Cup	UEFA Conference League	Total
1	FW	(Serbia)	18	Uroš Milovanović	12	1	0	0	13
2	FW	(Kazakhstan)	7	Zhaslan Zhumashev	7	2	0	0	9
3	FW	(Venezuela)	30	Luis Guerra	3	2	1	0	6
4	FW	(Belarus)	99	Vitaly Lisakovich	5	0	0	0	5
4	MF	(Morocco)	14	Amine Talal	3	1	0	1	5
6	MF	(Kazakhstan)	17	Aleksandr Zuyev	3	1	0	0	4
6	MF	(Kazakhstan)	8	Askhat Tagybergen	3	0	1	0	4
8	DF	(France)	72	Rayan Senhadji	2	0	0	0	2
8	FW	(Albania)	99	Rubin Hebaj	0	2	0	0	2
10	DF	(Montenegro)	15	Marko Vukčević	1	0	0	0	1
10	MF	(Belarus)	6	Maksim Myakish	1	0	0	0	1
10	DF	(Kazakhstan)	22	Aleksandr Marochkin	1	0	0	0	1
10	MF	(Kazakhstan)	29	Daniyar Usenov	0	1	0	0	1
10	MF	(Kazakhstan)	19	Dauren Zhumat	0	1	0	0	1
10	DF	(Montenegro)	4	Nemanja Cavnić	0	0	0	1	1
10	MF	(Kazakhstan)	10	Islam Chesnokov	0	0	0	1	1
10				Own goal	1	0	0	0	1
				TOTALS	42	11	2	3	58

=== Clean sheets ===
Place	Position	Nation	Number	Name	Premier League	Kazakhstan Cup	Super Cup	UEFA Conference League	Total
1	GK	(Kazakhstan)	44	Danil Ustimenko	3	0	0	0	3
2	GK	(Kazakhstan)	1	Sultan Busurmanov	1	0	0	0	1
2	GK	(Kazakhstan)	35	Yuri Melikhov	0	1	0	0	1
				TOTALS	4	1	0	0	5

=== Disciplinary record ===
Number	Nation	Position	Name	Premier League		Kazakhstan Cup		Super Cup		UEFA Conference League		Total	
Number	Nation	Position	Name	Yellow card	Red card	Yellow card	Red card	Yellow card	Red card	Yellow card	Red card	(yellow card) 0	Red card
1	(Kazakhstan)	GK	Sultan Busurmanov	1	0	0	0	0	0	0	0	1	0
3	(Kazakhstan)	DF	Roman Asrankulov	1	1	0	0	0	0	0	0	1	1
4	(Montenegro)	DF	Nemanja Cavnić	4	0	0	0	1	0	0	0	5	0
5	(France)	DF	Pape-Alioune Ndiaye	3	1	0	0	0	0	0	0	3	1
6	(Belarus)	MF	Maksim Myakish	3	1	0	0	0	0	2	0	5	1
7	(Kazakhstan)	FW	Zhaslan Zhumashev	2	0	0	0	0	0	0	0	2	0
8	(Kazakhstan)	MF	Askhat Tagybergen	6	0	1	0	1	0	0	0	8	0
13	(Guinea)	MF	Abdoulaye Cissé	2	0	1	0	0	0	2	0	5	0
14	(Morocco)	MF	Amine Talal	3	1	0	0	0	0	0	0	3	1
17	(Kazakhstan)	MF	Aleksandr Zuyev	4	0	0	0	0	0	0	0	4	0
18	(Serbia)	FW	Uroš Milovanović	3	0	0	0	0	0	1	0	4	0
19	(Kazakhstan)	MF	Dauren Zhumat	1	0	1	0	1	0	0	0	3	0
21	(Kazakhstan)	MF	Nauryzbek Zhagorov	4	1	1	0	0	0	0	0	5	1
22	(Kazakhstan)	DF	Aleksandr Marochkin	2	0	0	0	0	0	0	0	2	0
25	(Croatia)	DF	Antonio Boršić	2	1	0	0	0	0	0	0	2	1
30	(Venezuela)	FW	Luis Guerra	7	0	0	0	0	0	2	0	9	0
38	(Kazakhstan)	DF	Amanzhol Bakitzhanov	0	0	1	0	0	0	0	0	1	0
44	(Kazakhstan)	GK	Danil Ustimenko	2	0	0	0	0	0	0	0	2	0
88	(Kazakhstan)	MF	Meyrambek Kalmyrza	0	0	1	0	0	0	0	0	1	0
99	(Belarus)	FW	Vitaly Lisakovich	2	0	0	0	0	0	0	0	2	0
Players away from Tobol on loan:
10	(Kazakhstan)	MF	Islam Chesnokov	2	0	0	0	0	0	0	0	2	0
11	(Kazakhstan)	FW	Damir Marat	1	0	1	0	1	0	0	0	3	0
Players who left Tobol during the season:
26	(Russia)	DF	Kirill Glushchenkov	1	0	0	0	0	0	0	0	1	0
29	(Kazakhstan)	MF	Daniyar Usenov	0	0	2	1	0	0	0	0	2	1
99	(Albania)	FW	Rubin Hebaj	1	0	0	0	0	0	0	0	1	0
			TOTALS	56	6	9	1	4	0	7	0	76	7
