= 2026 Kazakhstan Premier League =

Kazakhstan Premier League
- Season: 2026
- Dates: 7 March – 31 October 2026
- Champions: Ordabasy
- Relegated: Zhetysu; Kaisar
- Champions League: Ordabasy
- Conference League: Kairat; Astana; Okzhetpes
- Matches: 240
- Goals: 615 (2.56 per match)
- Top goalscorer: Bjørn Johnsen (14)
- Biggest home win: Kairat 5–0 Okzhetpes; Kairat 5–0 Irtysh Pavlodar
- Biggest away win: Zhetysu 0–4 Ordabasy
- Highest scoring: Altai 3–3 Zhetysu; Kyzylzhar 2–4 Kairat; Altai 2–4 Aktobe
- Longest winning run: 10 matches Kairat
- Longest unbeaten run: 16 matches Ordabasy
- Longest winless run: 14 matches Irtysh Pavlodar
- Longest losing run: 6 matches Kaisar; Altai; Zhetysu; Kaspiy
- Highest attendance: 23,800 - Kairat vs Aktobe (16 March 2026)
- Lowest attendance: 200 - Kaspiy vs Okzhetpes (17 March 2026)
- Total attendance: 296,490
- Average attendance: 6,177 (19 April 2026)
- All statistics correct as of 31 October 2026.

The 2026 Kazakhstan Premier League was the 35th season of the Kazakhstan Premier League, the highest football league competition in Kazakhstan.

== Overview ==
For the 2026 season, the Kazakhstan Premier League will expand from 14 to 16 teams. This expansion was officially ratified by the Kazakhstan Football Federation (KFF) and the Professional Football League of Kazakhstan (QFL) as part of a long-term strategy to increase the professionalization of the sport and enhance regional representation across the country.

To facilitate the increase in participants, a specific promotion and relegation format was applied to the 2025 season:

- Only one team (the bottom-placed club) was relegated from the Premier League to the First Division.
- The top three teams from the Kazakhstan First Division earned direct promotion to the Premier League for 2026.

The expansion marks a return to a larger league format, which was previously reduced due to infrastructure and financial licensing requirements. Under the new 16-team structure, the KFF has introduced stricter stadium and financial criteria to ensure the sustainability of the newly promoted clubs.

== Teams ==
Following the conclusion of the 2025 season, Turan were the only club relegated to the Kazakhstan First Division after finishing in 14th place (last). This limited relegation was a one-time adjustment to allow for the league's expansion from 14 to 16 teams for the 2026 campaign.

To fill the expanded roster, three clubs were promoted from the Kazakhstan First Division:

- Caspiy – The champions of the 2025 First Division, returning to the top flight after a two-year absence.
- Irtysh Pavlodar – The runners-up, marking the historic return of the five-time Kazakhstan champions to the Premier League.
- Altai – The third-place finishers, securing the final promotion slot under the new expansion rules. Play in top flight for the first time.

=== Team overview ===
Locations of teams in the 2026 Kazakhstan Premier League

| Team | Location | Venue | Capacity |
|---|---|---|---|
| Altai | Oskemen | Vostok Stadium | 8,500 |
| Aktobe | Aktobe | Central Stadium | 12,729 |
| Astana | Astana | Astana Arena | 30,200 |
| Atyrau | Atyrau | Munaishy Stadium | 8,900 |
| Caspiy | Aktau | Zhastar Stadium | 5,000 |
| Elimai | Semey | Spartak Stadium | 8,000 |
| Irtysh | Pavlodar | Central Stadium | 12,000 |
| Kairat | Almaty | Central Stadium | 23,804 |
| Kaisar | Kyzylorda | Gany Muratbayev Stadium | 7,500 |
| Kyzylzhar | Petropavl | Karasai Stadium | 11,000 |
| Okzhetpes | Kokshetau | Torpedo Stadium | 4,100 |
| Ordabasy | Shymkent | Kazhymukan Munaitpasov Stadium | 20,000 |
| Tobol | Kostanay | Central Stadium | 9,500 |
| Ulytau | Jezkazgan | Metallurg Stadium | 2,500 |
| Zhenis | Astana | Astana Arena | 30,200 |
| Zhetysu | Taldykorgan | Samat Suyumbayev Stadium | 4,000 |

=== Personnel and kits ===
Note: Flags indicate national team as has been defined under FIFA eligibility rules. Players and Managers may hold more than one non-FIFA nationality.

| Team | Manager | Captain | Kit manufacturer | Shirt sponsor |
|---|---|---|---|---|
| Aktobe | (Tajikistan) Igor Cherevchenko | (Ukraine) Ivan Ordets | Adidas | Olimpbet, Kazchrome, A'su |
| Altay Oskemen | (Kazakhstan) Vakhid Masudov | (Kazakhstan) Dmitriy Schmidt | | |
| Astana | (Kazakhstan) Grigori Babayan | (Croatia) Marin Tomasov | Adidas | Samruk Kazyna, Olimpbet, Okadzaki, Miglior, SportQory |
| Atyrau | (Kazakhstan) Vladimir Cheburin | (Kazakhstan) Rinat Dzhumatov | Macron | Olimpbet, A'su, Dodo Pizza |
| Elimai | (Kazakhstan) Andrey Karpovich | (Kazakhstan) Ramazan Orazov | Puma | Altay Resurs |
| Irtysh | (Kazakhstan) Erlan Shoytymov | (Kazakhstan) Samat Zharynbetov | | |
| Jenis | (Serbia) Vladimir Slišković | (Kazakhstan) Islambek Kuat | Joma | Freedom Bank |
| Kairat | Vacant | (Belarus) Alyaksandr Martynovich | Joma | 1XBET, KNK Kemikal, EcoAlmaty, Alex Saryagash |
| Kaisar | (Kazakhstan) Dmitriy Karpov (caretaker) | (Kazakhstan) Nurymzhan Salaidin | Adidas | Biali, Olimpbet, A'su |
| Kaspiy | (Kazakhstan) Ruslan Esatov | (Kazakhstan) Amandyk Nabikhanov | | |
| Kyzylzhar | (Belarus) Vitaly Zhukovsky | (Ukraine) Yevhen Makarenko | Kelme | None |
| Okzhetpes | (Kazakhstan) Rinat Alyuetov | (Kazakhstan) Oralkhan Omirtayev | Jako | None |
| Ordabasy | (Moldova) Andrei Martin | (Kazakhstan) Serhiy Maliy | Puma | Olimpbet |
| Tobol | (Belarus) Miroslav Romashchenko | (Kazakhstan) Askhat Tagybergen | Macron | Solidcore Resources, Olimpbet |
| Ulytau | (Kazakhstan) Nurken Mazbayev | (Kazakhstan) Sergey Keiler | Cikers | Kazakhmys |
| Zhetysu | (Kazakhstan) Samat Smakov | (Kazakhstan) Serikzhan Muzhikov | Adidas | None |

=== Foreign players ===
The number of foreign players is restricted to thirteen per KPL team squad of 25 players. For transfers during the season, see Winter 2025–26 transfers and Summer 2026 transfers.

| Team | Player 1 | Player 2 | Player 3 | Player 4 | Player 5 | Player 6 | Player 7 | Player 8 | Player 9 | Player 10 | Player 11 | Player 12 | Player 13 | Former players |
|---|---|---|---|---|---|---|---|---|---|---|---|---|---|---|
| Aktobe | (Argentina national football team) Pibe | (Belarus national football team) **Nikita Korzun** | (Niger national football team) **Daniel Sosah** | (Portugal national football team) **Nani** | (Serbia national football team) Danilo Mitrović | (Spain national football team) Pablo Álvarez | (Sweden men's national football team) Ajdin Zeljković | (Ukraine national football team) **Ivan Ordets** | (Ukraine national football team) Dmytro Topalov | | | | | |
| Altai | (Croatia national football team) Nikola Jambor | (Nigeria national football team) Samuel Odeyobo | (Russia national football team) Ivan Konovalov | (Serbia national football team) **Nemanja Mićević** | (Serbia national football team) Dragan Stoisavljević | | | | | | | | | |
| Astana | (Bosnia and Herzegovina national football team) **Ivan Bašić** | (Croatia national football team) **Karlo Bartolec** | (Croatia national football team) Josip Čondrić | (Croatia national football team) Branimir Kalaica | (Croatia national football team) **Marin Tomasov** | (Lithuania national football team) **Kipras Kažukolovas** | (Nigeria national football team) Nnamdi Ahanonu | (Uzbekistan national football team) Asilbek Abdurasulov | | | | | | |
| Atyrau | (Belarus national football team) **Yegor Khatkevich** | (Belarus national football team) **Yegor Khvalko** | (Belarus national football team) **Ruslan Yudenkov** | (Brazil national football team) Henrique Devens | (Nigeria national football team) Mario Rabiu | (Russia national football team) Konstantin Dorofeyev | (Russia national football team) Soslan Takulov | (Russia national football team) Dmitri Yashin | (Ukraine national football team) Oleksandr Noyok | (Ukraine national football team) Dmytro Yusov | | | | |
| Caspiy | (Argentina national football team) Leonel Strumia | (Brazil national football team) Alan Dias | (Brazil national football team) Gustavo França | (France national football team) Noha Ndombasi | (Portugal national football team) André Amaral | (Portugal national football team) Bernardo Morgado | (Russia national football team) Idris Umayev | (Serbia national football team) Bogdan Petrović | (Spain national football team) Yan Andrin | (Turkey national football team) Berat Değirmenci | (Ukraine national football team) Max Kucheriavyi | | | |
| Elimai | (Albania national football team) Edison Ndreca | (Belarus national football team) **Yevgeny Beryozkin** | (Brazil national football team) Higor Gabriel | (Colombia national football team) Dubán Palacio | (Croatia national football team) Marin Belančić | (Croatia national football team) Hrvoje Ilić | (Portugal national football team) Vladimir Stojković | (Russia national football team) Ivan Miladinović | (Togo national football team) **Euloge Placca Fessou** | | | | | |
| Irtysh Pavlodar | (Belarus national football team) **Ruslan Khadarkevich** | (Belarus national football team) **Vladislav Klimovich** | (Belarus national football team) **Danila Nechayev** | (Belarus national football team) **Pavel Sedko** | (Ivory Coast national football team) Jean Morel Poé | (Ghana national football team) Fard Ibrahim | (Japan national football team) Yushi Shimamura | (Nigeria national football team) Godfrey Stephen | (Russia national football team) Vitaly Botnar | (Senegal national football team) Mamadou Mbodj | | | | |
| Kairat | (Argentina national football team) Sebastián Zeballos | (Belarus national football team) **Alyaksandr Martynovich** | (Brazil national football team) Lucas Áfrico | (Brazil national football team) Edmilson | (Brazil national football team) Ricardinho | (Finland national football team) **Oiva Jukkola** | (Finland national football team) **Jaakko Oksanen** | (Israel national football team) **Dan Glazer** | (Portugal national football team) Jorginho | (Portugal national football team) Luís Mata | (Spain national football team) Marc Gual | | | (Belarus national football team) **Valery Gromyko** (Russia national football team) **Yegor Sorokin** |
| Kaisar | (Brazil national football team) Miquéias | (Chile national football team) Thomas Jones | (Nigeria national football team) **Victor Moses** | (Nigeria national football team) **Imoh Ezekiel** | (Russia national football team) Amir Mokhammad | (Serbia national football team) Nikola Cuckić | (Slovakia national football team) Adam Kovac | | | | | | | |
| Kyzylzhar | (Bosnia and Herzegovina national football team) Damjan Krajišnik | (Bulgaria national football team) **Plamen Galabov** | (Cameroon national football team) **Stephane Bahoken** | (Ivory Coast national football team) Etienne Beugre | (Faroe Islands national football team) **Jóannes Bjartalíð** | (Moldova national football team) **Dumitru Celeadnic** | (Senegal national football team) Honore Gomis | (Serbia national football team) Nedeljko Piščević | (Ukraine national football team) **Yevhen Makarenko** | (Ukraine national football team) Anatoliy Kozlenko | | | | |
| Okzhetpes | (Belarus national football team) Dzmitry Baradzin | (Belarus national football team) Vasily Sovpel | (Brazil national football team) Léo Assunpção | (Russia national football team) Ivan Kuzmichev | (Russia national football team) Miroslav Lobantsev | (Ukraine national football team) Borys Lototskyi | (Uzbekistan national football team) Bektemir Abdumannonov | | | | | | | |
| Ordabasy | (Brazil national football team) Everton Moraes | (Brazil national football team) Léo Natel | (Bulgaria national football team) Dimitar Mitkov | (Cameroon national football team) **Guy-Marcelin Kilama Kilama** | (Ghana national football team) **David Abagna** | (North Macedonia national football team) Aleksa Amanović | (Moldova national football team) **Victor Mudrac** | (Romania national football team) Mihai Căpățînă | (Serbia national football team) Nikola Antić | (Ukraine national football team) Vladyslav Naumets | (Ukraine national football team) Yuriy Vakulko | | | |
| Tobol | (Albania national football team) Rubin Hebaj | (Belarus national football team) **Maksim Myakish** | (France national football team) Pape-Alioune Ndiaye | (Guinea national football team) **Abdoulaye Cissé** | (Montenegro national football team) Nemanja Cavnić | (Montenegro national football team) **Marko Vukčević** | (Morocco national football team) Amine Talal | (Russia national football team) Kirill Gluschenkov | (Serbia national football team) Uroš Milovanović | (Venezuela national football team) Luis Guerra | | | | |
| Ulytau | (Cameroon national football team) Arthur Bougnone | (Ghana national football team) David Martin | (Japan national football team) Hiroki Harada | (Japan national football team) Kotaro Kishi | (Nicaragua national football team) **Ariagner Smith** | (Russia national football team) Georgi Bugulov | (Ukraine national football team) Hlib Bukhal | (Ukraine national football team) Beka Vachiberadze | | | | | | |
| Zhenis | (Belarus national football team) **Maksim Plotnikov** | (Bosnia and Herzegovina national football team) Ivan Šaravanja | (Brazil national football team) Adílio | (Brazil national football team) Gian Martins | (Brazil national football team) Élder Santana | (Georgia national football team) Luka Imnadze | (Georgia national football team) **Elguja Lobjanidze** | (Georgia national football team) Zurab Tevzadze | (Nigeria national football team) Samson Iyede | | | | | |
| Zhetysu | (Georgia national football team) Tsotne Mosiashvili | (Moldova national football team) Ştefan Sicaci | (Montenegro national football team) Jovan Pajović | (Montenegro national football team) Mladen Kovačević | (Serbia national football team) Strahinja Jovanović | (Serbia national football team) Marko Živanović | (Venezuela national football team) Diego Luna | | | | | | | |

In bold: Players that have been capped for their national team. In Italic: Players that joined in mid-season

=== Managerial changes ===
| Team | Outgoing manager | Manner of departure | Date of vacancy | Position in table | Incoming manager | Date of appointment |
|---|---|---|---|---|---|---|
| Zhetysu | (Kazakhstan) Samat Smakov | End of contract | 14 November 2025 | Pre-season | (Kazakhstan) Kayrat Nurdauletov | 17 December 2025 |
| Kyzylzhar | (Serbia) Milić Ćurčić | End of contract | 31 December 2025 | Pre-season | (Kazakhstan) Ali Aliyev | 5 January 2026 |
| Atyrau | (Kazakhstan) Kuanysh Kabdulov | End of interim spell | 1 December 2025 | Pre-season | (Belarus) Vitaly Zhukovsky | 1 January 2026 |
| Tobol | (Kazakhstan) Nurbol Zhumaskaliyev | Resigned | 21 April 2026 | 15th | (Belarus) Miroslav Romashchenko | 22 April 2026 |
| Kairat | (Kazakhstan) Rafael Urazbakhtin | Resigned | 26 October 2026 | 2nd | TBC | TBC |

== Regular season ==
=== League table ===
| Pos | Team | Pld | W | D | L | GF | GA | GD | Pts | Qualification or relegation |
|---|---|---|---|---|---|---|---|---|---|---|
| 1 | Ordabasy (C) | 30 | 21 | 5 | 4 | 59 | 23 | +36 | 68 | Qualification for the Champions League first qualifying round |
| 2 | Kairat | 30 | 19 | 8 | 3 | 60 | 23 | +37 | 65 | Qualification for the Conference League second qualifying round |
| 3 | Astana | 30 | 15 | 9 | 6 | 48 | 31 | +17 | 54 | Qualification for the Conference League first qualifying round |
| 4 | Okzhetpes | 30 | 16 | 6 | 8 | 49 | 38 | +11 | 54 | Qualification for the Conference League first qualifying round |
| 5 | Aktobe | 30 | 14 | 7 | 9 | 47 | 39 | +8 | 49 | |
| 6 | Elimai | 30 | 12 | 9 | 9 | 43 | 44 | −1 | 45 | |
| 7 | Tobol | 30 | 12 | 5 | 13 | 42 | 42 | 0 | 41 | |
| 8 | Jenis | 30 | 9 | 9 | 12 | 32 | 40 | −8 | 36 | |
| 9 | Ulytau | 30 | 9 | 8 | 13 | 27 | 38 | −11 | 35 | |
| 10 | Kyzylzhar | 30 | 9 | 6 | 15 | 31 | 42 | −11 | 33 | |
| 11 | Kaspiy | 30 | 9 | 6 | 15 | 32 | 44 | −12 | 33 | |
| 12 | Irtysh | 30 | 8 | 8 | 14 | 31 | 44 | −13 | 32 | |
| 13 | Atyrau | 30 | 6 | 12 | 12 | 27 | 35 | −8 | 30 | |
| 14 | Altai | 30 | 6 | 10 | 14 | 31 | 42 | −11 | 28 | |
| 15 | Zhetysu (R) | 30 | 6 | 9 | 15 | 31 | 49 | −18 | 27 | Relegation to Kazakhstan First Division |
| 16 | Kaisar (R) | 30 | 4 | 13 | 13 | 25 | 41 | −16 | 25 | Relegation to Kazakhstan First Division |

Source: UEFA, Soccerway
Rules for classification: 1) Points; 2) Goal difference; 3) Matches won; 4) Goals scored; 5) Away goals scored; 6) Head-to-head points; 7) Head-to-head matches won; 8) Head-to-head goal difference; 9) Head-to-head goals scored; 10) Head-to-head away goals scored; 11) Draw..
(C) Champions; (R) Relegated

=== Results ===
==== Results table ====
| Home \ Away | AKT | ALT | AST | ATY | ELI | IRT | JEN | KAS | KRT | KSR | KYZ | OKZ | ORD | TOB | ULT | ZTS |
|---|---|---|---|---|---|---|---|---|---|---|---|---|---|---|---|---|
| Aktobe | — | 2–0 | 2–0 | 1–1 | 1–4 | 1–0 | 1–0 | 1–0 | | 3–0 | 0–0 | 2–1 | | 4–1 | 2–2 | 2–1 |
| Altai | 2–4 | — | 1–1 | | | 1–2 | 0–0 | 0–0 | 0–1 | 2–0 | 2–2 | 0–1 | 0–0 | 1–0 | 1–2 | 3–3 |
| Astana | 3–2 | 4–1 | — | 2–1 | 4–0 | 2–0 | 1–0 | | 1–0 | | 2–1 | 2–1 | 1–1 | 2–0 | 3–0 | 4–1 |
| Atyrau | 1–1 | 1–0 | 2–3 | — | 1–2 | | 0–0 | 1–2 | 1–3 | 2–0 | 0–1 | 0–2 | 0–3 | 1–1 | 0–0 | 1–1 |
| Elimai | 1–3 | 1–1 | 2–2 | 1–2 | — | 3–1 | 2–1 | 0–1 | 0–2 | 1–1 | 2–0 | | 1–3 | 1–0 | | 2–1 |
| Irtysh | 2–1 | 1–0 | 0–1 | 1–1 | 2–2 | — | 0–1 | 3–2 | 0–1 | 1–2 | 0–2 | 2–1 | | 0–2 | 1–1 | 1–2 |
| Jenis | 1–0 | 1–0 | 2–2 | 1–2 | 0–0 | 0–0 | — | 1–0 | 1–2 | | 3–1 | 1–1 | 0–2 | 1–0 | 1–1 | 4–1 |
| Kaspiy | 1–2 | 2–1 | 1–0 | 2–0 | 2–2 | 2–2 | 3–2 | — | 0–3 | 1–2 | | 1–3 | 3–2 | 1–0 | 1–1 | 0–1 |
| Kairat | 1–0 | | 4–0 | 1–1 | 2–2 | | 3–0 | 2–0 | — | 0–0 | 3–0 | 5–0 | 2–1 | 1–4 | 3–1 | 1–0 |
| Kaisar | 1–2 | 1–1 | 0–0 | 1–0 | 2–3 | 0–0 | 1–1 | 1–1 | 1–2 | — | 0–0 | 2–3 | 1–4 | 2–1 | 0–0 | 1–1 |
| Kyzylzhar | 3–1 | 1–2 | 1–1 | 0–1 | 0–1 | 2–2 | 4–0 | 2–1 | 2–4 | 1–1 | — | 0–1 | 1–2 | 1–1 | | 3–2 |
| Okzhetpes | 2–2 | 4–1 | 1–0 | 0–0 | 1–1 | 2–1 | 3–1 | | 1–3 | 1–1 | | — | 2–1 | 2–1 | 2–1 | 2–0 |
| Ordabasy | 2–0 | 3–1 | 1–0 | 1–1 | 3–1 | 2–2 | | 2–0 | 2–1 | 2–0 | 3–0 | 2–1 | — | 2–0 | 1–0 | 2–1 |
| Tobol | | 3–1 | 2–1 | 1–0 | 0–3 | 1–0 | | 2–1 | 1–1 | 3–2 | 2–0 | 3–1 | 0–3 | — | 3–1 | 2–2 |
| Ulytau | 1–1 | 0–3 | 0–2 | | 1–0 | 1–2 | 2–1 | 1–0 | 1–1 | 1–0 | 1–0 | 2–0 | 0–1 | 2–1 | — | 3–0 |
| Zhetysu | 1–0 | 0–1 | | 0–0 | 0–1 | 1–0 | 2–3 | 0–1 | 0–0 | | 1–2 | 2–2 | 0–4 | | 2–0 | — |

Updated to match(es) played on 14 October 2026. Source: Premier League Kazakhstan
Legend: Blue = home team win; Yellow = draw; Red = away team win.

==== Results by match played ====
| Team ╲ Round | 1 | 2 | 3 | 4 | 5 | 6 | 7 | 8 | 9 | 10 | 11 | 12 | 13 | 14 | 15 | 16 | 17 | 18 | 19 | 20 | 21 | 22 | 23 | 24 | 25 | 26 | 27 | 28 | 29 | 30 |
|---|---|---|---|---|---|---|---|---|---|---|---|---|---|---|---|---|---|---|---|---|---|---|---|---|---|---|---|---|---|---|
| Aktobe | W | L | L | D | W | L | W | L | W | D | D | D | W | W | L | W | L | W | W | L | D | W | L | W | W | D | W | W | D | W |
| Altai | L | D | D | L | L | D | D | L | D | W | L | D | L | D | L | W | W | L | L | L | W | L | L | W | W | L | L | L | D | D |
| Astana | W | D | W | L | D | D | W | L | W | L | W | D | W | L | D | W | W | W | W | W | W | D | W | W | L | W | L | L | D | D |
| Atyrau | D | D | D | D | W | L | L | W | D | D | D | D | D | L | L | L | W | L | L | D | D | L | L | W | L | L | W | W | L | W |
| Elimai | D | D | W | W | W | D | D | L | L | D | W | W | L | W | W | W | L | L | D | D | W | D | L | L | W | W | L | L | D | L |
| Irtysh | D | D | D | W | L | L | L | L | L | D | D | D | L | D | L | D | L | L | W | W | L | L | W | L | W | W | L | L | W | W |
| Jenis | D | L | D | D | L | W | D | W | W | L | L | W | L | D | D | L | W | D | L | D | L | W | W | L | W | L | L | L | D | W |
| Kaspiy | L | L | D | L | L | L | L | W | W | L | D | L | L | L | W | W | W | D | W | L | D | D | W | L | L | W | W | W | L | L |
| Kairat | W | W | D | W | D | W | D | W | D | W | D | L | D | W | W | W | W | W | W | W | W | W | W | W | L | L | W | W | D | D |
| Kaisar | D | D | L | D | L | D | D | D | L | W | D | L | W | D | W | D | L | D | D | L | L | L | L | L | W | D | L | L | D | L |
| Kyzylzhar | W | L | D | D | W | W | L | L | L | L | D | W | L | L | L | L | L | D | W | W | L | D | L | L | L | D | W | W | W | W |
| Okzhetpes | D | W | W | D | W | L | D | W | D | W | W | D | D | W | L | L | L | W | L | W | L | W | W | W | L | W | L | L | W | W |
| Ordabasy | D | W | W | D | D | W | W | W | D | W | W | W | W | W | W | W | L | W | L | W | W | W | W | L | W | W | W | W | D | L |
| Tobol | L | D | L | L | D | L | W | L | W | L | L | D | W | L | W | L | W | D | W | L | W | W | L | W | W | L | W | W | D | L |
| Ulytau | D | W | L | D | W | W | L | W | D | W | L | D | W | D | L | L | W | D | L | L | D | L | W | L | L | D | W | W | L | L |
| Zhetysu | L | D | D | W | L | W | W | D | L | L | D | L | D | D | W | L | L | L | L | D | L | L | L | W | L | L | L | L | D | D |

Updated to match(es) played on 31 October 2026. Source: Premier League Kazakhstan
W = Win; D = Draw; L = Loss; P = Postponed

==== Positions by round ====
To preserve chronological evolvements, any postponed matches are not included to the round at which they were originally scheduled, but added to the full round they were played immediately afterwards.

| Team ╲ Round | 1 | 2 | 3 | 4 | 5 | 6 | 7 | 8 | 9 | 10 | 11 | 12 | 13 | 14 | 15 | 16 | 17 | 18 | 19 | 20 | 21 | 22 | 23 | 24 | 25 | 26 | 27 | 28 | 29 | 30 |
|---|---|---|---|---|---|---|---|---|---|---|---|---|---|---|---|---|---|---|---|---|---|---|---|---|---|---|---|---|---|---|
| Kairat | 4 | 1 | 1 | 1 | 1 | 1 | 1 | 1 | 1 | 1 | 1 | 2 | 2 | 2 | 2 | 2 | 2 | 2 | 2 | 2 | 2 | 2 | 2 | 2 | 1 | 2 | 2 | 2 | 2 | 2 |
| Astana | 2 | 6 | 6 | 6 | 6 | 7 | 5 | 6 | 5 | 5 | 5 | 5 | 4 | 6 | 4 | 4 | 4 | 4 | 3 | 3 | 3 | 3 | 3 | 3 | 3 | 3 | 3 | 3 | 3 | 3 |
| Tobol | 15 | 15 | 15 | 15 | 15 | 15 | 14 | 14 | 15 | 15 | 15 | 15 | 13 | 13 | 9 | 9 | 9 | 9 | 8 | 10 | 8 | 7 | 7 | 7 | 7 | 7 | 7 | 7 | 7 | 7 |
| Elimai | 8 | 2 | 2 | 2 | 2 | 3 | 3 | 5 | 4 | 4 | 4 | 4 | 6 | 7 | 7 | 7 | 7 | 7 | 5 | 6 | 4 | 5 | 5 | 5 | 6 | 6 | 5 | 6 | 6 | 6 |
| Aktobe | 1 | 9 | 9 | 9 | 9 | 10 | 9 | 10 | 7 | 7 | 7 | 7 | 7 | 5 | 5 | 5 | 5 | 5 | 4 | 5 | 6 | 6 | 6 | 6 | 5 | 5 | 6 | 5 | 5 | 5 |
| Jenis | 9 | 13 | 13 | 13 | 13 | 12 | 11 | 11 | 8 | 8 | 8 | 8 | 8 | 9 | 8 | 8 | 8 | 8 | 9 | 8 | 9 | 9 | 9 | 9 | 9 | 8 | 8 | 10 | 9 | 8 |
| Ordabasy | 5 | 4 | 4 | 4 | 4 | 2 | 2 | 2 | 2 | 2 | 2 | 1 | 1 | 1 | 1 | 1 | 1 | 1 | 1 | 1 | 1 | 1 | 1 | 1 | 2 | 1 | 1 | 1 | 1 | 1 |
| Okzhetpes | 7 | 3 | 3 | 3 | 3 | 5 | 6 | 3 | 3 | 3 | 3 | 3 | 3 | 3 | 3 | 3 | 3 | 3 | 6 | 4 | 5 | 4 | 4 | 4 | 4 | 4 | 4 | 4 | 4 | 4 |
| Kyzylzhar | 3 | 5 | 5 | 5 | 5 | 4 | 4 | 8 | 9 | 9 | 9 | 9 | 10 | 11 | 14 | 14 | 14 | 14 | 12 | 9 | 11 | 11 | 11 | 11 | 14 | 15 | 16 | 12 | 11 | 10 |
| Ulytau | 12 | 7 | 7 | 7 | 7 | 6 | 8 | 4 | 6 | 6 | 6 | 6 | 5 | 4 | 6 | 6 | 6 | 6 | 7 | 7 | 7 | 8 | 8 | 8 | 8 | 9 | 9 | 8 | 8 | 9 |
| Kaisar | 10 | 12 | 12 | 12 | 12 | 13 | 13 | 13 | 13 | 12 | 12 | 12 | 12 | 12 | 10 | 10 | 10 | 10 | 11 | 12 | 13 | 13 | 14 | 14 | 15 | 14 | 15 | 16 | 16 | 16 |
| Zhetysu | 16 | 11 | 11 | 11 | 11 | 8 | 7 | 7 | 11 | 11 | 11 | 11 | 11 | 10 | 12 | 12 | 12 | 12 | 14 | 14 | 14 | 15 | 12 | 12 | 11 | 12 | 13 | 15 | 15 | 15 |
| Atyrau | 11 | 8 | 8 | 8 | 8 | 9 | 10 | 9 | 10 | 10 | 10 | 10 | 9 | 8 | 11 | 11 | 11 | 11 | 13 | 13 | 12 | 12 | 13 | 13 | 12 | 13 | 14 | 11 | 14 | 13 |
| Kaspiy | 13 | 16 | 16 | 16 | 16 | 16 | 16 | 16 | 16 | 16 | 16 | 16 | 16 | 16 | 13 | 13 | 13 | 13 | 10 | 11 | 10 | 10 | 10 | 10 | 10 | 10 | 10 | 9 | 10 | 11 |
| Irtysh | 6 | 10 | 10 | 10 | 10 | 11 | 12 | 12 | 13 | 13 | 13 | 13 | 14 | 14 | 16 | 16 | 16 | 16 | 16 | 15 | 16 | 16 | 16 | 16 | 16 | 16 | 12 | 14 | 12 | 12 |
| Altay | 14 | 14 | 14 | 14 | 14 | 14 | 15 | 15 | 14 | 14 | 14 | 14 | 15 | 15 | 15 | 15 | 15 | 15 | 15 | 16 | 15 | 14 | 15 | 15 | 13 | 11 | 11 | 13 | 13 | 14 |

| Leader and Champions League first qualifying round |
| Conference League first qualifying round |
| Relegation to 2027 Kazakhstan First Division |

Updated to match(es) played on 31 October 2026. Source: PFLK

== Season statistics ==
==== Top scorers ====
| Rank | Player | Club | Goals |
|---|---|---|---|
| 1 | (Norway) Bjørn Johnsen | Ordabasy | 14 |
| 2 | (Spain) Marc Gual | Kairat | 12 |
| 2 | (Serbia) Uroš Milovanović | Tobol | 12 |
| 4 | (Croatia) Marin Tomasov | Astana | 11 |
| 5 | (Brazil) Edmilson | Kairat | 10 |
| 5 | (Kazakhstan) Artur Shushenachev | Aktobe | 10 |
| 5 | (Kazakhstan) Roman Murtazayev | Yelimay | 10 |
| 8 | (Kazakhstan) Elkhan Astanov | Ordabasy | 9 |
| 8 | (Togo) Euloge Placca Fessou | Elimai | 9 |
| 8 | (Kazakhstan) Oralkhan Omirtayev | Okzhetpes | 9 |

=== Top assist ===
| Rank | Player | Team | Assists |
|---|---|---|---|
| 1 | (Argentina) Pibe | Aktobe | 9 |
| 2 | (Kazakhstan) Vladislav Vasiljev | Okzhetpes | 8 |
| 2 | (Kazakhstan) Bauyrzhan Islamkhan | Astana | 8 |
| 4 | (Brazil) Edmilson | Kairat | 7 |
| 4 | (Kazakhstan) Askhat Tagybergen | Tobol | 7 |
| 6 | (Kazakhstan) Askhat Baltabekov | Zhetysu | 6 |
| 6 | (Faroe Islands) Jóannes Bjartalíð | Kyzylzhar | 6 |
| 8 | (Kazakhstan) Elkhan Astanov | Ordabasy | 5 |
| 8 | (Kazakhstan) Zhasulan Amir | Ordabasy | 5 |
| 8 | (Finland) Oiva Jukkola | Kairat | 5 |
| 8 | (Belarus) Pavel Sedko | Caspiy | 5 |
| 8 | (Brazil) Léo Natel | Ordabasy | 5 |
| 8 | (Venezuela) Luis Guerra | Tobol | 5 |
| 8 | (Portugal) Luís Mata | Kairat | 5 |
| 8 | (Kazakhstan) Elisey Gorshunov | Altai | 5 |
| 8 | (Kazakhstan) Sagi Malikaydar | Irtysh Pavlodar | 5 |
| 8 | (Portugal) Nani | Aktobe | 5 |
| 8 | (Croatia) Hrvoje Ilić | Yelimay | 5 |

=== Clean sheets ===
| Rank | Player | Team | Clean sheets |
