= Romaschenko =

Romaschenko (Russian or Ukrainian: Ромащенко, Belarusian: Рамашчанка) is a gender-neutral Ukrainian-language patronymic surname originating from the given name Roman. The surname may refer to

- Maksim Romaschenko (born 1976), Belarusian football player
- Miroslav Romaschenko (born 1973), Belarusian football player, brother of Maksim
