= Ogai =

Ogai or Ōgai is a surname. Notable people with the surname include:

- Dmitry Ogai (born 1960), Kazakhstani football manager
- Mori Ōgai (1862–1922), Japanese Army surgeon, translator, novelist, and poet
