= Rayan Senhadji =

French footballer (born 1997)

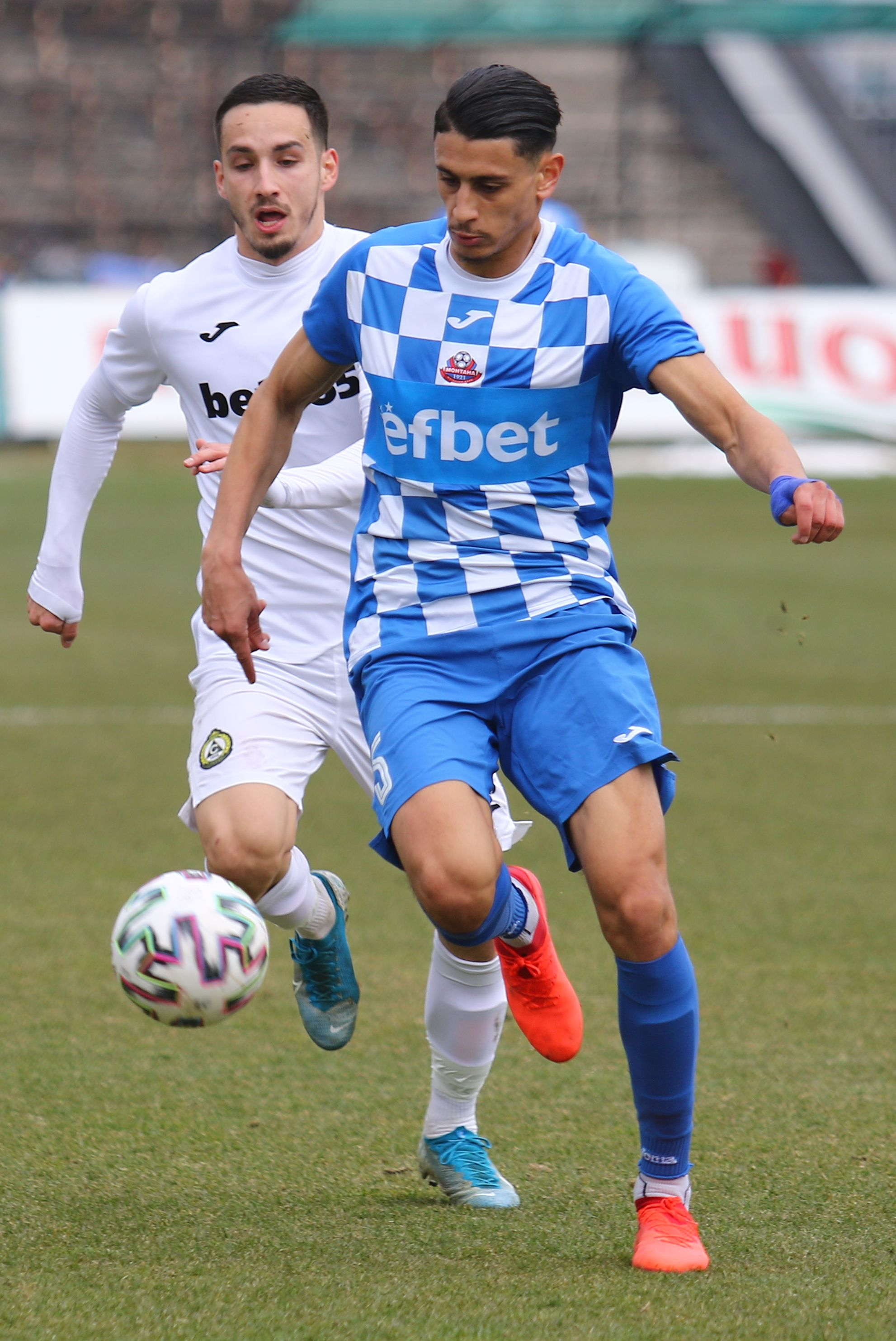
- Senjaji with Montana in 2021

Personal information
- Date of birth: 13 June 1997 (age 29)
- Place of birth: Lyon, France
- Height: 1.90 m (6 ft 3 in)
- Position: Centre-back

Team information
- Current team: Tobol
- Number: 72

Youth career
- –2016: Sochaux

Senior career*
Years	Team	Apps	(Gls)
2014–2019	Sochaux II	77	(4)
2016–2020	Sochaux	0	(0)
2020	→ Béziers (loan)	5	(0)
2020–2021	Montana	14	(1)
2022	Jammerbugt	14	(0)
2022–2023	JS Kabylie	2	(0)
2023	Pirin Blagoevgrad	15	(0)
2023–2024	Krumovgrad	17	(0)
2024–2025	Fakel Voronezh	32	(0)
2025–2026	Sumgayit	28	(1)
2026–	Tobol	13	(2)
- * Club domestic league appearances and goals as of 1 November 2026

Rayan Senhadji (born 13 June 1997) is a French football player who plays as a centre-back for the Kazakhstan Premier League side FC Tobol.

== Club career ==
On 15 January 2024, Senhadji signed with the Russian Premier League club Fakel Voronezh. He made his RPL debut for Fakel on 3 March 2024 in a game against Pari NN. Senhadji left Fakel on 17 July 2025.

On 23 July 2025, Senhadji signed with the Azerbaijan Premier League club Sumgayit FK.

On 2 June 2026, Kazakhstan Premier League club FC Tobol announced the signing of Senhadji.

== Career statistics ==
As of match played 24 May 2025

Appearances and goals by club, season and competition
Club	Season	League			National Cup		League Cup		Europe		Other		Total	
Club	Season	Division	Apps	Goals	Apps	Goals	Apps	Goals	Apps	Goals	Apps	Goals	Apps	Goals
Sochaux II	2014–15	CFA 2	4	0	—		—		—		—		4	0
Sochaux II	2015–16	CFA 2	7	0	—		—		—		—		7	0
Sochaux II	2016–17	CFA 3	18	1	—		—		—		—		18	1
Sochaux II	2017–18	CFA 3	22	0	—		—		—		—		22	0
Sochaux II	2018–19	CFA 3	18	1	—		—		—		—		18	1
Sochaux II	2019–20	CFA 3	8	0	—		—		—		—		8	0
Sochaux II	Total		77	2	—		—		—		—		77	2
Sochaux	2016–17	Ligue 2	0	0	0	0	0	0	—		—		0	0
Sochaux	2019–20	Ligue 2	0	0	1	0	1	0	—		—		2	0
Sochaux	Total		0	0	1	0	1	0	—		—		2	0
Béziers (loan)	2019–20	CFA	5	0	—		—		—		—		5	0
Montana	2020–21	Bulgarian First League	14	1	2	0	—		—		—		16	1
Jammerburgt	2021–22	Danish 1st Division	14	0	0	0	—		—		—		14	0
Kabylie	2022–23	Algerian Ligue 1	2	0	—		—		0	0	—		2	0
Pirin Blagoevgrad	2022–23	Bulgarian First League	15	0	0	0	—		—		—		15	0
Krumovgrad	2023–24	Bulgarian First League	17	0	1	0	—		—		—		18	0
Fakel	2023–24	Russian Premier League	12	0	—		—		—		—		12	0
Fakel	2024–25	Russian Premier League	20	0	3	0	—		—		—		23	0
Fakel	Total		32	0	3	0	—		—		—		35	0
Career total			176	3	7	0	1	0	0	0	0	0	184	3
