= Kirill Glushchenkov =

Russian footballer

Personal information
- Full name: Kirill Yuryevich Glushchenkov
- Date of birth: 5 February 2000 (age 26)
- Place of birth: Stavropol, Russia
- Height: 1.91 m (6 ft 3 in)
- Position: Midfielder

Team information
- Current team: Dynamo Brest
- Number: 3

Youth career
- Football DYuSSh Stavropol
- 2018–2020: Dynamo Moscow

Senior career*
| Years | Team | Apps | (Gls) |
| 2020 | Fakel Voronezh | 1 | (0) |
| 2020 | → Fakel-M Voronezh | 5 | (0) |
| 2021–2022 | Isloch Minsk Raion | 37 | (1) |
| 2023 | Torpedo-BelAZ Zhodino | 27 | (2) |
| 2024–2026 | Pari Nizhny Novgorod | 9 | (0) |
| 2024 | → Pari NN-2 Nizhny Novgorod | 2 | (0) |
| 2025 | → Torpedo-BelAZ Zhodino (loan) | 25 | (3) |
| 2026 | Tobol | 4 | (0) |
| 2026– | Dynamo Brest | 1 | (0) |
- * Club domestic league appearances and goals as of 6 July 2026

Kirill Yuryevich Glushchenkov (Russian: Кирилл Юрьевич Глущенков; born 5 February 2000) is a Russian football player who plays for Belarusian Premier League club Dynamo Brest.

== Club career ==
He made his debut in the Russian Football National League for FC Fakel Voronezh on 1 August 2020 in a game against FC Akron Tolyatti, he substituted Andrey Nikitin in the 85th minute.

On 10 January 2024, Glushchenkov signed a four-year contract with Russian Premier League club Pari Nizhny Novgorod. He made his RPL debut for Pari NN on 9 March 2024 against Rubin Kazan. On 26 December 2024, he was loaned back to Torpedo-BelAZ Zhodino until the end of 2025. On 4 February 2026, the contract with Pari NN was mutually terminated.

== Career statistics ==
As of match played on 28 August 2024

Appearances and goals by club, season and competition
| Club | Season | League | | | National Cup | | Europe | | Other | | Total | |
| Club | Season | Division | Apps | Goals | Apps | Goals | Apps | Goals | Apps | Goals | Apps | Goals |
|---|---|---|---|---|---|---|---|---|---|---|---|---|
| Fakel | 2020–21 | Russian First League | 1 | 0 | 1 | 0 | — | | — | | 2 | 0 |
| Fakel-M | 2020–21 | Russian Second League | 5 | 0 | — | | — | | — | | 5 | 0 |
| Isloch | 2021 | Belarusian Premier League | 21 | 1 | 5 | 0 | — | | 0 | 0 | 26 | 1 |
| Isloch | 2022 | Belarusian Premier League | 16 | 0 | 0 | 0 | — | | 0 | 0 | 16 | 0 |
| Isloch | Total | | 37 | 1 | 5 | 0 | — | | 0 | 0 | 42 | 1 |
| Torpedo-BelAZ Zhodino | 2023 | Belarusian Premier League | 27 | 2 | 7 | 0 | 2 (Note: Appearances in UEFA Europa Conference League) | 1 | 0 | 0 | 36 | 3 |
| Nizhny Novgorod | 2023–24 | Russian Premier League | 8 | 0 | — | | — | | — | | 8 | 0 |
| Nizhny Novgorod | 2024–25 | Russian Premier League | 1 | 0 | 2 | 0 | — | | — | | 3 | 0 |
| Nizhny Novgorod | Total | | 9 | 0 | 2 | 0 | — | | — | | 11 | 0 |
| Career total | | | 79 | 3 | 15 | 0 | 2 | 0 | 0 | 0 | 96 | 4 |
