= FC Tobol =

Association football club in Kazakhstan

Tobol
- Full name: Football Club Tobol; Тобыл футбол клубы
- Founded: 1967; 59 years ago
- Ground: Central Stadium; Kostanay, Kazakhstan
- Capacity: 9,500
- Owner: Alimzhan Kaldiyarov
- Chairman: Nikolay Panin
- Head coach: Miroslav Romaschenko
- League: Kazakhstan Premier League
- 2026: 7th of 16
- Website: fctobol.kz
Home colours	Away colours	Third colours

FC Tobol (Kazakh: Тобыл футбол клубы, Tobyl futbol kluby) is a Kazakh professional football club based at the Central Stadium in Kostanay. They have been members of the Kazakhstan Premier League since its foundation in 1992. They won the Kazakhstan Premier League in 2010 and 2021, and finished no lower than fourth place between the 2002 and 2010 seasons. They also won the 2007 UEFA Intertoto Cup.

== History ==
Following a surprise defeat to Kyzylzhar in the 2016 Kazakhstan Cup, manager Dmitriy Ogai left the club by mutual consent, with Oleg Lotov being appointed as interim manager on 30 April 2016. Lotov was replaced with Omari Tetradze as the club's manager on 30 May 2016.

Prior to the start of the season, Vladimir Nikitenko was appointed as Tobyl's manager following the expiration of Robert Yevdokimov's contract. On 1 August, Vladimir Nikitenko resigned as manager after Tobyl were eliminated from the Europa League. Andrei Miroshnichenko was appointed as Caretaker manager before Marek Zub was announced as Tobyl's new manager on 6 August 2018. On 31 December 2018, Zub left Tobyl after his contract wasn't renewed, and Vladimir Gazzayev was appointed as the club's new manager. Gazzayev resigned as manager on 21 July 2019 after Tobyl were eliminated from the 2019–20 UEFA Europa League by Jeunesse Esch.

On 14 December 2019, Grigori Babayan was appointed as manager of FC Tobyl. On 17 June 2021, Babayan left his role as Head Coach by mutual consent to take up a coaching role at CSKA Moscow. The following day, 18 June 2021, Alexander Moskalenko has appointed as Acting Head Coach. On 16 May 2022, Moskalenko left his role at Tobyl, with Milan Milanović being appointed as the clubs new Head Coach on 20 May 2022.

On 10 January 2023, Milić Ćurčić was appointed as the new Head Coach of Tobyl.

In July 2023 Andrei Kanchelskis was appointed General Director of Tobyl.

=== Names ===
- 1967 : Avtomobilist
- 1982 : Energetik
- 1990 : Kustanayets
- 1992 : Khimik
- 1995 : Tobol

=== Domestic history ===
Season	League									Kazakhstan Cup	Top goalscorer		Manager
Season	Div.	Pos.	Pl.	W	D	L	GS	GA	P	Kazakhstan Cup	Name	League	Manager
1992	1st	13	26	7	3	16	29	45	17		(Kazakhstan) V.Velman		
1993	1st	8	22	7	5	10	26	31	19		(Kazakhstan) Oleg Malyshev	19	
1994	1st	10	30	11	5	14	42	37	27		(Kazakhstan) Maksim Nizovtsev	20	
1995	1st	12	30	10	6	14	28	33	36		(Kazakhstan) Oleg Malyshev		
1996	1st	11	34	10	15	9	35	35	45		(Kazakhstan) Oleg Malyshev		
1999	1st	8	30	12	5	13	28	29	41		(Kazakhstan) E.Glazunov		
2000	1st	7	28	13	3	12	42	39	42		(Kazakhstan) A.Gornalev		
2001	1st	6	32	15	4	13	48	43	49		(Kazakhstan) Nurbol Zhumaskaliyev	12	
2002	1st	3	32	15	7	10	45	43	52	Last 16	(Kazakhstan) Nurken Mazbaev	9	(Ukraine) Mykhaylo Olefirenko
2003	1st	2	32	24	4	4	55	19	76	Runners-up	(Kazakhstan) Nurbol Zhumaskaliyev	16	(Kazakhstan) Vladimir Mukhanov
2004	1st	3	36	22	11	3	87	27	60	Last 32	(Uzbekistan) Ulugbek Bakayev	22	(Kazakhstan) Vladimir Mukhanov
2005	1st	2	30	21	6	3	53	21	69	Last 16	(Uzbekistan) Ulugbek Bakayev	15	(Kazakhstan) Dmitry Ogai
2006	1st	3	30	16	8	6	43	22	56	Quarter-final	(Kazakhstan) Nurbol Zhumaskaliyev	14	(Kazakhstan) Dmitry Ogai
2007	1st	2	30	19	7	4	60	20	64	Winners	(Kazakhstan) Sergei Ostapenko	10	(Kazakhstan) Dmitry Ogai
2008	1st	2	30	20	7	3	58	21	67	Semi-final	(Moldova) Alexandru Golban		(Kazakhstan) Dmitry Ogai
2009	1st	4	26	14	9	3	54	23	51	Second round	(Turkmenistan) Wladimir Baýramow	18	(Kazakhstan) Dmitry Ogai
2010	1st	1	32	19	7	6	53	25	64	Quarter-final	(Uzbekistan) Ulugbek Bakayev	16	(Russia) Ravil Sabitov
2011	1st	7	32	14	3	15	48	44	32	Runners-up	(Kazakhstan) Sergey Gridin	12	(Russia) Ravil Sabitov (Russia) Sergei Petrenko
2012	1st	6	26	13	6	7	42	27	45	Quarter-final	(Kazakhstan) Bauyrzhan Dzholchiyev	8	(Ukraine) Vyacheslav Hroznyi
2013	1st	7	32	14	6	12	48	33	35	Quarter-final	(Moldova) Igor Bugaiov	13	(Kazakhstan) Timur Urazov
2014	1st	7	32	10	12	10	35	35	26	Quarter-final	(Austria) Tomáš Šimkovič (Kazakhstan) Nurbol Zhumaskaliyev (Czech Republic) Jiří Jeslínek	5	(Kazakhstan) Sergei Maslenov (Armenia) Vardan Minasyan
2015	1st	7	32	12	6	14	32	42	30	Semi-final	(Austria) Tomáš Šimkovič (Kazakhstan) Nurbol Zhumaskaliyev (Nigeria) Uche Kalu	5	(Armenia) Vardan Minasyan (Kazakhstan) Sergei Maslenov
2016	1st	7	32	12	5	15	40	10	41	Last 16	(Kazakhstan) Sergei Khizhnichenko	10	(Kazakhstan) Dmitry Ogai (Kazakhstan) Oleg Lotov (Caretaker) (Russia) Omari Tetradze
2017	1st	5	33	12	11	10	36	26	47	Last 16	(Kazakhstan) Aleksey Shchotkin	10	(Russia) Omari Tetradze (Russia) Robert Yevdokimov
2018	1st	3	33	15	8	10	36	30	53	Quarter-final	(Kazakhstan) Azat Nurgaliev	8	(Kazakhstan) Vladimir Nikitenko (Kazakhstan) Andrei Miroshnichenko (Caretaker) (Poland) Marek Zub
2019	1st	4	33	19	6	8	45	27	63	Semi-final	(Kazakhstan) Azat Nurgaliev	10	(Russia) Vladimir Gazzayev (Kazakhstan) Nurbol Zhumaskaliyev (Caretaker)
2020	1st	2	20	12	2	6	26	16	38	-	(Kazakhstan) Azat Nurgaliev	5	(Kazakhstan) Grigori Babayan
2021	1st	1	26	18	7	1	54	18	61	Semi-final	(Serbia) Nemanja Nikolić	8	(Kazakhstan) Grigori Babayan (Kazakhstan) Alexander Moskalenko (Caretaker)
2022	1st	3	26	14	5	7	46	33	47	Group Stage	(Uzbekistan) Igor Sergeyev	9	(Kazakhstan) Alexander Moskalenko (Caretaker) (Serbia) Milan Milanović
2023	1st	8	26	9	7	10	29	33	34	Winners	(Ivory Coast) Serges Déblé	7	(Serbia) Milic Curcic
2024	1st	5	24	11	6	7	33	23	39	Semi-final	(Kazakhstan) Islam Chesnokov	10	(Serbia) Milic Curcic (Kazakhstan) Nurbol Zhumaskaliyev
2025	1st	3	24	16	6	4	45	25	54	Winners	(Kazakhstan) Islam Chesnokov	9	(Kazakhstan) Nurbol Zhumaskaliyev
2026	1st	7	30	12	5	13	42	42	41	Quarter-final	(Serbia) Uroš Milovanović	12	(Kazakhstan) Nurbol Zhumaskaliyev (Belarus) Miroslav Romashchenko

=== Continental history ===
In their first European appearance, Tobyl reached the third round of the 2003 Intertoto Cup. They beat Polonia Warszawa and Sint-Truiden, and lost to SV Pasching. In UEFA Cup 2006-07 FC Basel were hard nuts to crack for Tobyl. They won the Intertoto Cup 2007, defeating FC Zestaponi, Slovan Liberec and OFI and advanced to 2nd qualifying round of UEFA Cup 2007-08.

As of match played 6 August 2026

Competition	Played	Won	Drew	Lost	GF	GA	GD	Win%
European Cup / Champions League	4	0	2	2	2	8	−6	0.00
UEFA Cup / UEFA Europa League	18	5	4	9	14	23	−9	27.78
UEFA Conference League	21	6	4	11	19	31	−12	28.57
UEFA Intertoto Cup	12	8	1	3	16	8	+8	66.67
Total	55	18	11	26	50	71	−21	32.73

Legend: GF = Goals For. GA = Goals Against. GD = Goal Difference.

Season	Competition	Round	Opponent	Home	Away	Aggregate
2003	Intertoto Cup	1R	(Poland) Polonia Warszawa	2–1	3–0	5–1
2003	Intertoto Cup	2R	(Belgium) Sint-Truidense	1–0	2–0	3–0
2003	Intertoto Cup	3R	(Austria) SV Pasching	0–1	0–3	0–4
2006–07	UEFA Cup	1Q	(Switzerland) FC Basel	0–0	1–3	1–3
2007	Intertoto Cup	1R	(Georgia (country)) FC Zestaponi	3–0	0–2	3–2
2007	Intertoto Cup	2R	(Czech Republic) Slovan Liberec	1–1	2–0	3–1
2007	Intertoto Cup	3R	(Greece) OFI	1–0	1–0	2–0
2007–08	UEFA Cup	2Q	(Poland) Dyskobolia Grodzisk	0–1	0–2	0–3
2008–09	UEFA Cup	1Q	Austria Wien	1–0	0–2	1–2
2009–10	UEFA Europa League	2Q	(Turkey) Galatasaray	1–1	0–2	1–3
2010–11	UEFA Europa League	1Q	(Bosnia and Herzegovina) Zrinjski Mostar	1–2	1–2	2–4
2011–12	UEFA Champions League	2Q	(Slovakia) Slovan Bratislava	1–1	0–2	1–3
2018–19	UEFA Europa League	1Q	(Georgia (country)) Samtredia	2–0	1–0	3–0
2018–19	UEFA Europa League	2Q	(Armenia) Pyunik	2–1	0–1	2–2 (a)
2019–20	UEFA Europa League	1Q	(Luxembourg) Jeunesse Esch	1–1	0–0	1–1 (a)
2021–22	UEFA Europa Conference League	2Q	(Croatia) Hajduk Split	4–1 (a.e.t.)	0–2	4–3
2021–22	UEFA Europa Conference League	3Q	(Slovakia) Žilina	0–1	0–5	0−6
2022–23	UEFA Champions League	1Q	(Hungary) Ferencváros	0–0	1–5	1−5
2022–23	UEFA Europa Conference League	2Q	(Gibraltar) Lincoln Red Imps	2–0	1–0	3−0
2022–23	UEFA Europa Conference League	3Q	(Bosnia and Herzegovina) Zrinjski Mostar	1–1	0–1	1−2
2023–24	UEFA Europa Conference League	1Q	(Finland) Honka	2–1	0–0	2−1
2023–24	UEFA Europa Conference League	2Q	(Switzerland) Basel	1–2	3–1	4−3
2023–24	UEFA Europa Conference League	3Q	(Republic of Ireland) Derry City	1–0	0–1 (a.e.t.)	1−1 (6–5 p)
2023–24	UEFA Europa Conference League	PO	(Czech Republic) Viktoria Plzeň	1–2	0–3	1–5
2024–25	UEFA Europa League	1Q	(Slovakia) Ružomberok	1–0	2–5	3–5
2024–25	UEFA Conference League	2Q	(Switzerland) St. Gallen	0–1	1–4	1–5
2026–27	UEFA Conference League	2Q	(Lithuania) Panevėžys	1–1 (a.e.t.)	1–1	2–2 (3–2 p)
2026–27	UEFA Conference League	3Q	(Serbia) Partizan		0–3	

== Honours ==
- Kazakhstan Premier League
  - Winners (2): 2010, 2021
- Kazakhstan Cup
  - Winners (3): 2007, 2023, 2025
- Kazakhstan Super Cup
  - Winners (4): 2021, 2022, 2024, 2026
- UEFA Intertoto Cup
  - Winners (1): 2007 (Joint Winner)

== Current squad ==
As of 18 August 2026

Note: Flags indicate national team as defined under FIFA eligibility rules; some limited exceptions apply. Players may hold more than one non-FIFA nationality.

No.	Pos.	Nation	Player
1	GK	KAZ	Sultan Busurmanov
3	DF	KAZ	Roman Asrankulov
4	DF	MNE	Nemanja Cavnić
5	DF	FRA	Pape-Alioune Ndiaye
6	MF	BLR	Maksim Myakish
7	MF	KAZ	Zhaslan Zhumashev
8	MF	KAZ	Askhat Tagybergen
10	MF	KAZ	Beybit Galym
11	FW	KAZ	Damir Marat
13	MF	GUI	Abdoulaye Cissé
14	MF	MAR	Amine Talal
15	DF	MNE	Marko Vukčević
17	MF	KAZ	Aleksandr Zuyev

No.	Pos.	Nation	Player
18	FW	SRB	Uroš Milovanović
19	MF	KAZ	Dauren Zhumat
21	MF	KAZ	Nauryzbek Zhagorov
22	DF	KAZ	Aleksandr Marochkin
25	DF	CRO	Antonio Boršić
30	FW	VEN	Luis Guerra
35	GK	KAZ	Yuri Melikhov
38	DF	KAZ	Amanzhol Bakitzhanov
44	GK	KAZ	Danil Ustimenko
72	DF	FRA	Rayan Senhadji
88	MF	KAZ	Meyrambek Kalmyrza
99	FW	BLR	Vitaly Lisakovich

== Managers ==
- (Ukraine) Mykhaylo Olefirenko (2002)
- (Russia) Vladimir Mukhanov (2003–04)
- (Kazakhstan) Dmitriy Ogai (1 January 2005 – 31 December 2009)
- (Russia) Ravil Sabitov (3 December 2009 – 22 May 2011)
- (Russia) Sergei Petrenko (1 June 2011 – 19 September 2011)
- (Ukraine) Vyacheslav Hroznyi (12 December 2011 – 31 December 2012)
- (Kazakhstan) Timur Urazov (1 January 2013 – 31 December 2013)
- (Kazakhstan) Sergei Maslenov (1 January 2014 – 22 April 2014)
- (Armenia) Vardan Minasyan (23 April 2014 – 16 April 2015)
- (Kazakhstan) Sergei Maslenov (16 April 2015 – December 2015)
- (Kazakhstan) Dmitriy Ogai (21 December 2015 – 28 April 2016)
- (Kazakhstan) Oleg Lotov (Interim) (30 April 2016 – 30 May 2016)
- (Russia) Omari Tetradze (30 May 2016 – 27 June 2017)
- (Russia) Robert Yevdokimov (7 July 2017 – 25 December 2017)
- (Kazakhstan) Vladimir Nikitenko (January 2018 – 1 August 2018)
- (Kazakhstan) Andrei Miroshnichenko (Caretaker)(1–6 August 2018)
- (Poland) Marek Zub (6 August 2018 – 31 December 2018)
- (Russia) Vladimir Gazzayev (31 December 2018 – 21 July 2019 )
- (Kazakhstan) Nurbol Zhumaskaliyev (Caretaker) (22 July – 14 December 2019)
- (Kazakhstan) Grigori Babayan (14 December 2019 - 17 June 2021)
- (Kazakhstan) Alexander Moskalenko (Caretaker) (18 June 2021 – 16 May 2022)
- (Serbia) Milan Milanović (20 May 2022 – 24 December 2022)
- (Serbia) Milić Ćurčić (10 January 2023 – present)

== See also ==
- Kazakhstani football clubs in European competitions
