= Nemanja Cavnić =

Montenegrin footballer (born 1995)

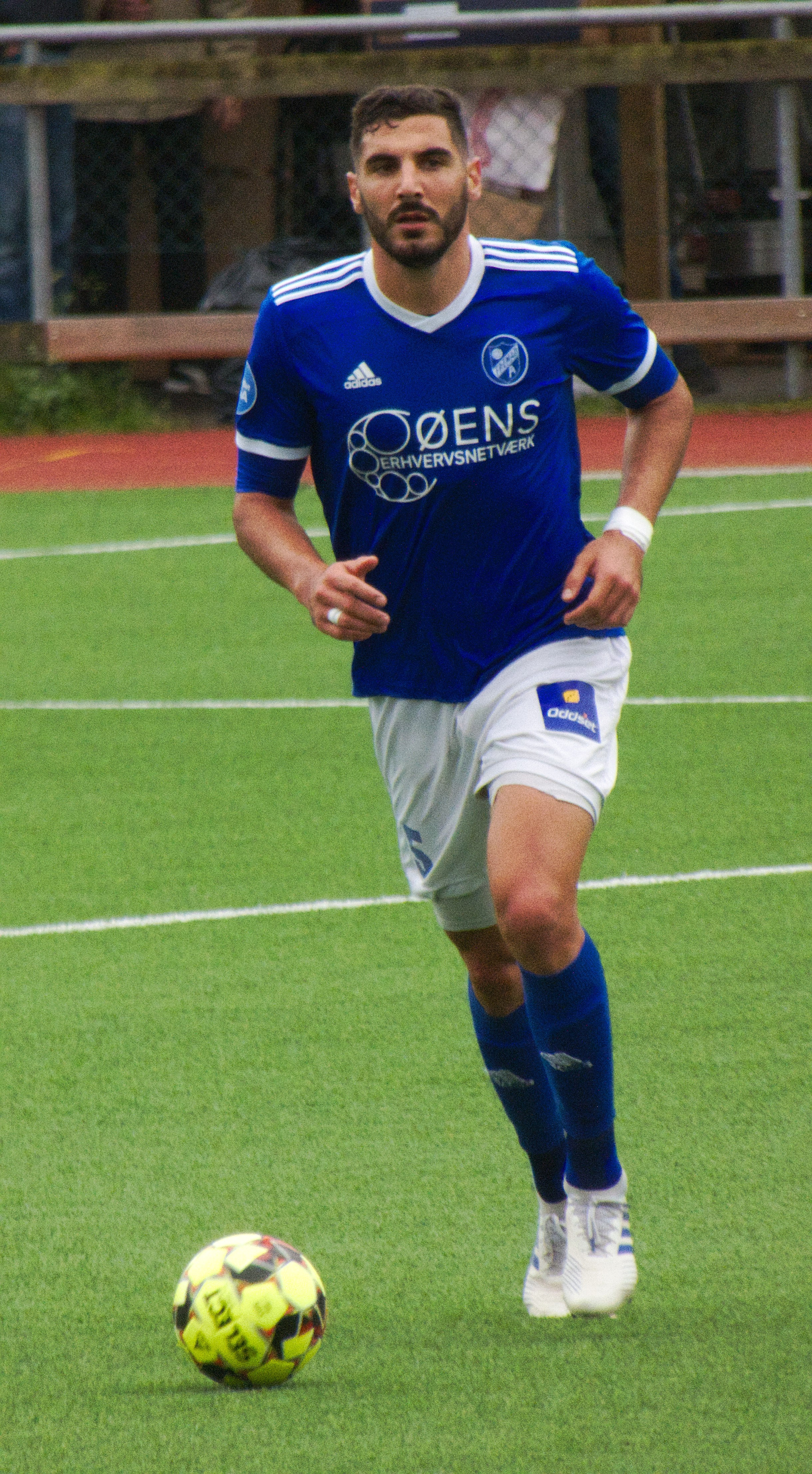
- Cavnić playing for Fremad Amager in 2019

Personal information
- Date of birth: 5 September 1995 (age 31)
- Place of birth: Podgorica, FR Yugoslavia
- Height: 1.95 m (6 ft 5 in)
- Position: Centre-back

Team information
- Current team: FC Tobol
- Number: 4

Youth career
- 2012–2014: Zeta

Senior career*
Years	Team	Apps	(Gls)
2014–2018	Zeta	135	(3)
2018–2021	Fremad Amager	82	(1)
2021–2024	HB Køge	70	(4)
2024–2025	Željezničar	30	(0)
2025–	FC Tobol	31	(1)

International career
2014	Montenegro U19	1	(0)
2014	Montenegro U21	3	(0)
- * Club domestic league appearances and goals as of 1 November 2026

Nemanja Cavnić (born 5 September 1995) is a Montenegrin professional footballer who plays as a centre-back for Kazakhstan Premier League club FC Tobol.

== Club career ==
After playing for the youth team of Zeta, Cavnić started playing for the senior team in 2014. In 2018, he moved to Denmark, playing for Danish second-tier clubs Fremad Amager and HB Køge.

On 2 February 2024, Cavnić signed a one-and-a-half-year contract with Bosnian Premier League side Željezničar. He made his debut for the club in a 0–0 home draw against Zrinjski Mostar on 17 February 2024. Cavnić left Željezničar after his contract expired in June 2025.

== International career ==
Cavnić represented Montenegro on both the under-19 and under-21 youth levels.

== Career statistics ==
=== Club ===
As of match played 2 July 2026

Appearances and goals by club, season and competition
Club	Season	League	League		Cup		Continental		Total	
Club	Season	League	Apps	Goals	Apps	Goals	Apps	Goals	Apps	Goals
Zeta	2013–14	1. CFL	20	0	0	0	—		20	0
Zeta	2014–15	1. CFL	31	0	0	0	—		31	0
Zeta	2015–16	1. CFL	25	0	2	0	—		27	0
Zeta	2016–17	1. CFL	31	1	3	0	—		34	1
Zeta	2017–18	1. CFL	28	2	2	0	1	0	31	2
Zeta	Total		135	3	7	0	1	0	143	3
Fremad Amager	2018–19	Danish 1st Division	31	1	2	0	—		33	1
Fremad Amager	2019–20	Danish 1st Division	27	0	2	0	—		29	0
Fremad Amager	2020–21	Danish 1st Division	24	0	4	0	—		28	0
Fremad Amager	Total		82	1	8	0	—		90	1
HB Køge	2021–22	Danish 1st Division	27	1	0	0	—		27	1
HB Køge	2022–23	Danish 1st Division	27	3	1	0	—		28	3
HB Køge	2023–24	Danish 1st Division	16	0	2	0	—		18	0
HB Køge	Total		70	4	3	0	—		73	4
Željezničar	2023–24	Bosnian Premier League	14	0	—		—		14	0
Željezničar	2024–25	Bosnian Premier League	16	0	2	0	—		18	0
Željezničar	Total		30	0	2	0	—		32	0
Tobol	2025	Kazakhstan Premier League	9	1	2	0	—		11	1
Tobol	2026	Kazakhstan Premier League	13	0	1 (Note: Appearance in Kazakhstan Super Cup)	0	—		14	0
Tobol	Total		22	1	3	0	—		25	1
Career total			339	9	23	0	1	0	363	9
