= Pibe =

Argentine footballer (born 1996)

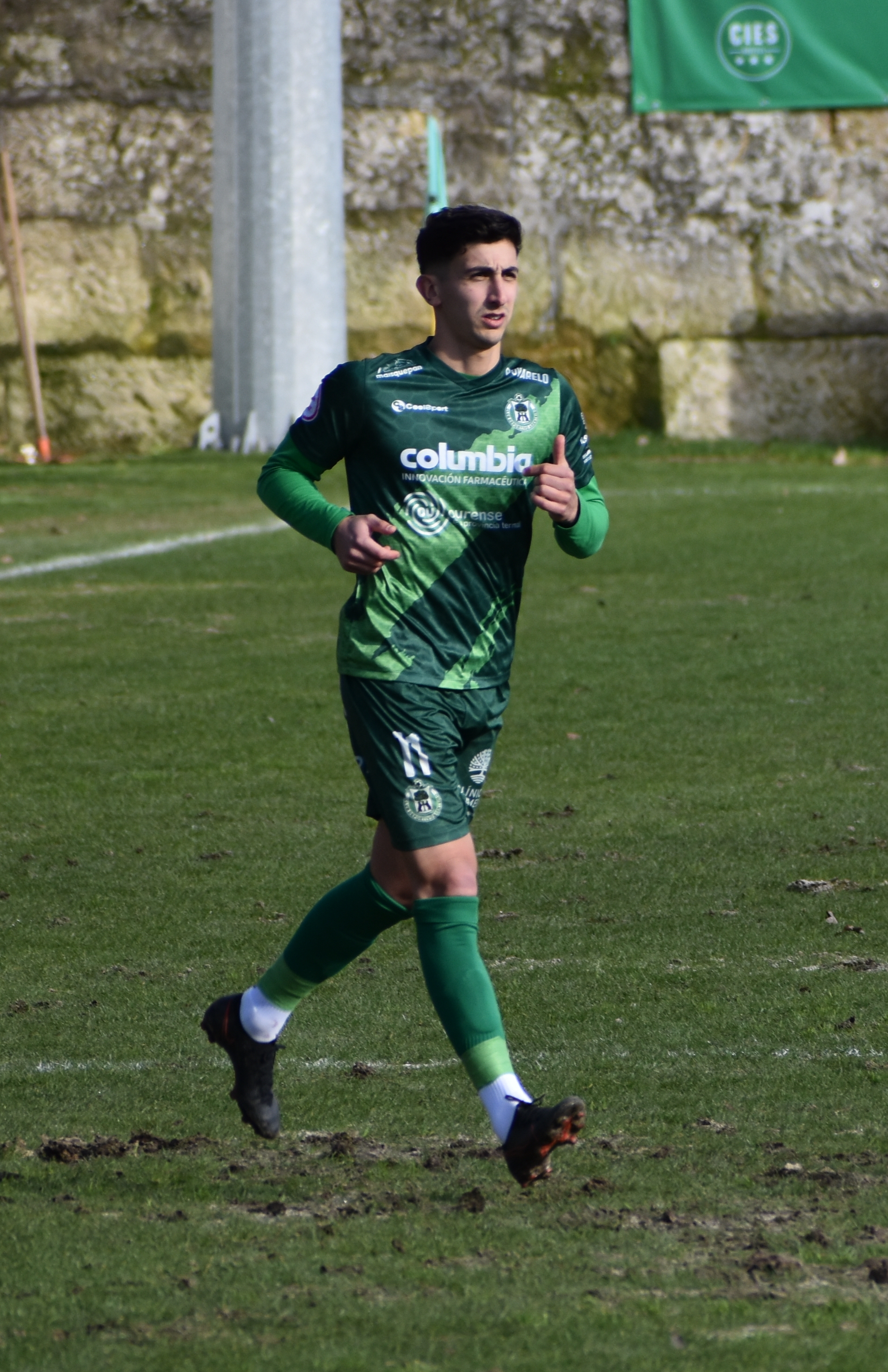
- Pibe playing for Arenteiro in 2023

Personal information
- Full name: Agustín Emanuel Pastoriza Cacabelos
- Date of birth: 31 January 1996 (age 30)
- Place of birth: Adrogué, Argentina
- Height: 1.77 m (5 ft 9 1/2 in)
- Position: Winger

Team information
- Current team: Aktobe
- Number: 14

Youth career
- Pontevedra
- 2013–2015: Betis

Senior career*
Years	Team	Apps	(Gls)
2013	Pontevedra B	7	(1)
2013	Pontevedra	1	(0)
2014	Betis	1	(0)
2014–2016	Betis B	7	(0)
2016	Oviedo B	19	(1)
2016–2018	Coruxo	34	(1)
2018–2019	Pontevedra	25	(1)
2019–2020	Ourense	27	(10)
2020–2021	Burgos B	9	(4)
2021	Inter Turku	5	(1)
2022–2024	Arenteiro	82	(13)
2024–2026	Cultural Leonesa	55	(3)
2026–	Aktobe	27	(2)
- * Club domestic league appearances and goals as of 1 November 2026

Agustín Emanuel Pastoriza Cacabelos (born 31 January 1996), commonly known as Pibe, is an Argentine professional footballer who plays as a winger for Kazakhstan Premier League club Aktobe.

== Club career ==
Born in Adrogué, Pibe moved to Spain in 2002, aged five. He played youth football for Pontevedra CF, and made his senior debuts with the reserves in the regional leagues. On 17 March 2013 he made his first-team debut, playing an entire half in a 1–1 home draw against UD Barbadás.

In June, Pibe joined Real Betis, being initially assigned to the Juvenil squad. He appeared in his first official game with the Andalusians' main squad on 18 May 2014, coming on as a second-half substitute in 1–2 La Liga loss at CA Osasuna.

On 5 January 2016, after being rarely used at Real Betis B, Pibe moved to another reserve team, Real Oviedo Vetusta in Tercera División. On 11 August, he signed for Segunda División B side Coruxo FC.

Pibe returned to his first club Pontevedra on 25 January 2018.

In January 2021, Pibe signed for Inter Turku in Finland.

On 10 January 2022, he returned to Spain and signed with Arenteiro.

Before the 2024–25 season, Pibe signed with Cultural Leonesa for one season, with an option to extend. On 17 January 2026, he moved to FC Aktobe in Kazakhstan.
