= Amine Talal =

Moroccan footballer (born 1996)

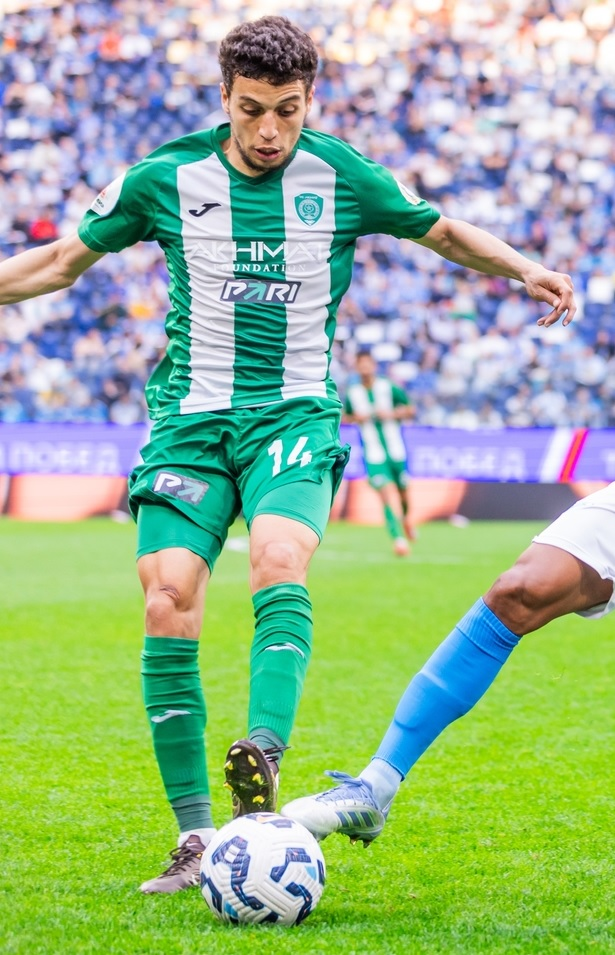
- Talal with Akhmat in 2025

Personal information
- Full name: Mohamed Amine Talal
- Date of birth: 5 June 1996 (age 30)
- Place of birth: Casablanca, Morocco
- Height: 1.78 m (5 ft 10 in)
- Position: Central midfielder

Team information
- Current team: Tobol
- Number: 14

Youth career
- 2014–2017: Orléans

Senior career*
Years	Team	Apps	(Gls)
2017–2019	Orléans II	16	(6)
2017–2021	Orléans	58	(6)
2021–2023	Bastia	34	(4)
2023–2024	Sheriff Tiraspol	23	(9)
2024–2026	Akhmat Grozny	20	(2)
2026–	Tobol	22	(3)
- * Club domestic league appearances and goals as of 1 November 2026

Mohamed Amine Talal (born 5 June 1996) is a Moroccan professional footballer who plays as a central midfielder for Kazakh club Tobol. He can also play as an attacking midfielder or defensive midfielder.

== Career ==
Talal joined the Orléans academy in 2014. He signed his first professional contract with them on 28 June 2017. He made his professional debut with Orléans on 24 November 2017, in a 2–1 Ligue 2 loss to Clermont Foot.

On 7 September 2021, he signed a two-year contract with Bastia in Ligue 2.

On 16 January 2023, Moldovan Super Liga club Sheriff Tiraspol announced the signing of Talal from Bastia. On 20 February 2024, Sheriff announced the departure of Amine Talal to Akhmat Grozny. Akhmat announced that Talal signed a two-and-a-half-year contract with the club.

On 5 January 2026, Kazakhstan Premier League club Tobol announced the signing of Talal.

== Career statistics ==
As of 2 July 2026

Appearances and goals by club, season and competition
Club	Season	League			Cup		Europe		Other		Total	
Club	Season	Division	Apps	Goals	Apps	Goals	Apps	Goals	Apps	Goals	Apps	Goals
Orléans II	2017–18	Championnat National 3	12	5	—		—		—		12	5
Orléans II	2018–19	Championnat National 3	4	1	—		—		—		4	1
Orléans II	Total		16	6	—		—		—		16	6
Orléans	2017–18	Ligue 2	3	0	—		—		—		3	0
Orléans	2018–19	Ligue 2	8	1	1	0	—		1 (Note: Appearances in the Coupe de la Ligue)	0	10	1
Orléans	2019–20	Ligue 2	13	0	1	1	—		2	0	16	1
Orléans	2020–21	Championnat National	30	5	2	0	—		—		32	5
Orléans	2021–22	Championnat National	4	0	—		—		—		4	0
Orléans	Total		58	6	4	1	—		3	0	65	7
Bastia	2021–22	Ligue 2	24	3	5	0	—		—		29	3
Bastia	2022–23	Ligue 2	10	1	2	0	—		—		12	1
Bastia	Total		34	4	7	0	—		—		41	4
Sheriff Tiraspol	2022–23	Moldovan Super Liga	10	1	3	0	3 (Note: Appearances in the UEFA Europa Conference League)	0	—		16	1
Sheriff Tiraspol	2023–24	Moldovan Super Liga	13	8	1	0	10 (Note: Four appearances, three goals in the UEFA Champions League, six appearances in the UEFA Europa League)	3	—		24	11
Sheriff Tiraspol	Total		23	9	4	0	13	3	—		40	12
Akhmat Grozny	2023–24	Russian Premier League	0	0	0	0	—		—		0	0
Akhmat Grozny	2024–25	Russian Premier League	18	2	6	1	—		2 (Note: Appearances in the relegation play-offs)	0	26	3
Akhmat Grozny	2025–26	Russian Premier League	2	0	2	0	—		—		4	0
Akhmat Grozny	Total		20	2	8	1	—		2	0	30	3
Tobol	2026	Kazakhstan Premier League	8	1	2	1	—		—		10	2
Career total			159	28	24	3	13	3	5	0	202	34
