= Valdas Paulauskas =

Lithuanian footballer

Personal information
- Date of birth: 4 February 2001 (age 25)
- Place of birth: Palanga, Lithuania
- Height: 1.78 m (5 ft 10 in)
- Position: Centre-forward

Team information
- Current team: FK Panevėžys
- Number: 79

Youth career
- –2017: PFA
- 2017–2019: LFF Akademija

Senior career*
Years	Team	Apps	(Gls)
2019–2023	Riteriai	36	(3)
2022	→ Banga (loan)	28	(3)
2023–2024	Banga	39	(8)
2025–2026	Kauno Žalgiris	31	(1)
2026–	Panevėžys	2	(0)

International career^{‡}
2016	Lithuania U16	3	(0)
2017–2018	Lithuania U17	7	(0)
2019	Lithuania U19	6	(0)
2021	Lithuania U21	3	(0)
2024–	Lithuania	1	(0)
- * Club domestic league appearances and goals as of 13 July 2026 ‡ National team caps and goals as of 6 September 2024

Valdas Paulauskas (born 4 February 2001) is a Lithuanian football player who plays as a centre-forward for Panevėžys Club and the Lithuania national team.

== Career ==
On 15 January 2025 Valdas Paulauskas signed with Kauno Žalgiris.

On 21 July 2025 Valdas Paulauskas scored his first goal for FK Kauno Žalgiris in A Lyga against Dainava.

On 1 July 2026, FK Panevėžys announced the signing of Valdas Paulauskas.

== International career ==
Paulauskas made his debut for the Lithuania national team on 6 September 2024 in a Nations League game against Cyprus at the Sūduva Stadium. He substituted Artūr Dolžnikov in the 86th minute as Cyprus won 1–0.

== Honours ==
FK Kauno Žalgiris

- A Lyga: 2025
