= Bernardo Morgado =

Portuguese footballer (born 1998)

Personal information
- Full name: Bernardo Gil Coutinho Morgado
- Date of birth: 24 March 1998 (age 28)
- Place of birth: Setúbal, Portugal
- Height: 1.91 m (6 ft 3 in)
- Position: Centre-back

Team information
- Current team: Caspiy
- Number: 30

Youth career
- –2012: GD Os Amarelos
- 2012: Vitória
- 2013–2014: Sporting CP
- 2014–2019: Vitória
- 2019–2020: Estoril Praia

Senior career*
Years	Team	Apps	(Gls)
2020–2021	Ytterhogdals	10	(0)
2021–2022	Piteå	26	(1)
2022–2023	Trollhättan	28	(2)
2023–2024	Hødd	23	(0)
2024–2026	Degerfors	33	(0)
2026–	Caspiy	25	(1)
- * Club domestic league appearances and goals as of 1 November 2026

Bernardo Gil Coutinho Morgado (born 24 March 1998) is a Portuguese professional footballer who plays as a centre-back for Kazakhstan Premier League club Caspiy.

== Early life ==
Morgado was born on 24 March 1998. Born in Setúbal, Portugal, he is the son of a Portuguese footballer. Growing up, he was friends with Angola international Rui Modesto.

== Career ==
Morgado started his career with Portuguese side Vitória FC in 2017, where he made zero league appearances. During the summer of 2020, he signed for Swedish side Ytterhogdals IK, where he made ten league appearances and scored zero goals. Following his stint there, he signed for Swedish side Piteå IF, where he made twenty-six league appearances and scored one goal.

In 2022, he signed for Swedish side FC Trollhättan, where he made twenty-eight league appearances and scored two goals. Ahead of the 2023 season, he signed for Norwegian side IL Hødd, where he made eighteen league appearances and scored zero goals. Subsequently, he signed for Swedish side Degerfors IF in 2024, where he captained the club and helping them achieve promotion from the second tier to the top flight. He also became team captain.
