= Maksim Myakish =

Belarusian footballer

Personal information
- Date of birth: 3 March 2000 (age 26)
- Place of birth: Grodno, Belarus
- Height: 1.91 m (6 ft 3 in)
- Position: Midfielder

Team information
- Current team: Tobol
- Number: 6

Youth career
- 2014–2015: Neman Grodno
- 2015–2017: RGUOR Minsk
- 2018: U.D. Leiria

Senior career*
Years	Team	Apps	(Gls)
2017–2018	Neman Grodno	2	(0)
2019–2021	BATE Borisov	0	(0)
2020	→ Slavia Mozyr (loan)	3	(0)
2021	→ Isloch Minsk Raion (loan)	22	(1)
2022–2024	Torpedo-BelAZ Zhodino	74	(5)
2025	Dinamo Minsk	28	(4)
2026–	Tobol	24	(1)

International career^{‡}
2016–2017	Belarus U17	6	(0)
2017–2018	Belarus U19	6	(0)
2019–2022	Belarus U21	13	(0)
2025–	Belarus	1	(0)
- * Club domestic league appearances and goals as of 1 November 2026 ‡ National team caps and goals as of 8 September 2025

Maksim Myakish (Belarusian: Максім Мякіш; Russian: Максим Мякиш; born 3 March 2000) is a Belarusian professional footballer who plays for Tobol and the Belarus national team.

== Honours ==
BATE Borisov

- Belarusian Cup winner: 2019–20, 2020–21
