= Borys Lototskyi =

Ukrainian footballer

Personal information
- Full name: Boris Valeriyovych Lototskyi
- Date of birth: 11 April 2003 (age 23)
- Place of birth: Bila Tserkva, Ukraine
- Height: 1.83 m (6 ft 0 in)
- Position: Defender

Team information
- Current team: Okzhetpes
- Number: 3

Senior career*
Years	Team	Apps	(Gls)
2022–2024	Nyva Vinnytsia	40	(3)
2024	Chornomorets Odesa	2	(0)
2025	Nyva Vinnytsia	19	(4)
2026–	Okzhetpes	28	(5)
- * Club domestic league appearances and goals as of 1 November 2026

Boris Valeriyovych Lototskyi (Ukrainian: Борис Валерійович Лотоцький; born 11 April 2003) is a Ukrainian professional footballer who plays as a defender for Kazakh side Okzhetpes.

== Career ==
In July 2024 Lototskyi joined Ukrainian Premier League side FC Chornomorets Odesa, making his debut against Kryvbas Kryvyi Rih on 3 August 2024. At the beginning of January 2025, Lototskyi left the Sailors. In March 2025, Lototskyi joined ukrainian side Nyva Vinnytsia.
