= Abdoulaye Cissé (footballer, born 1996) =

Guinean footballer

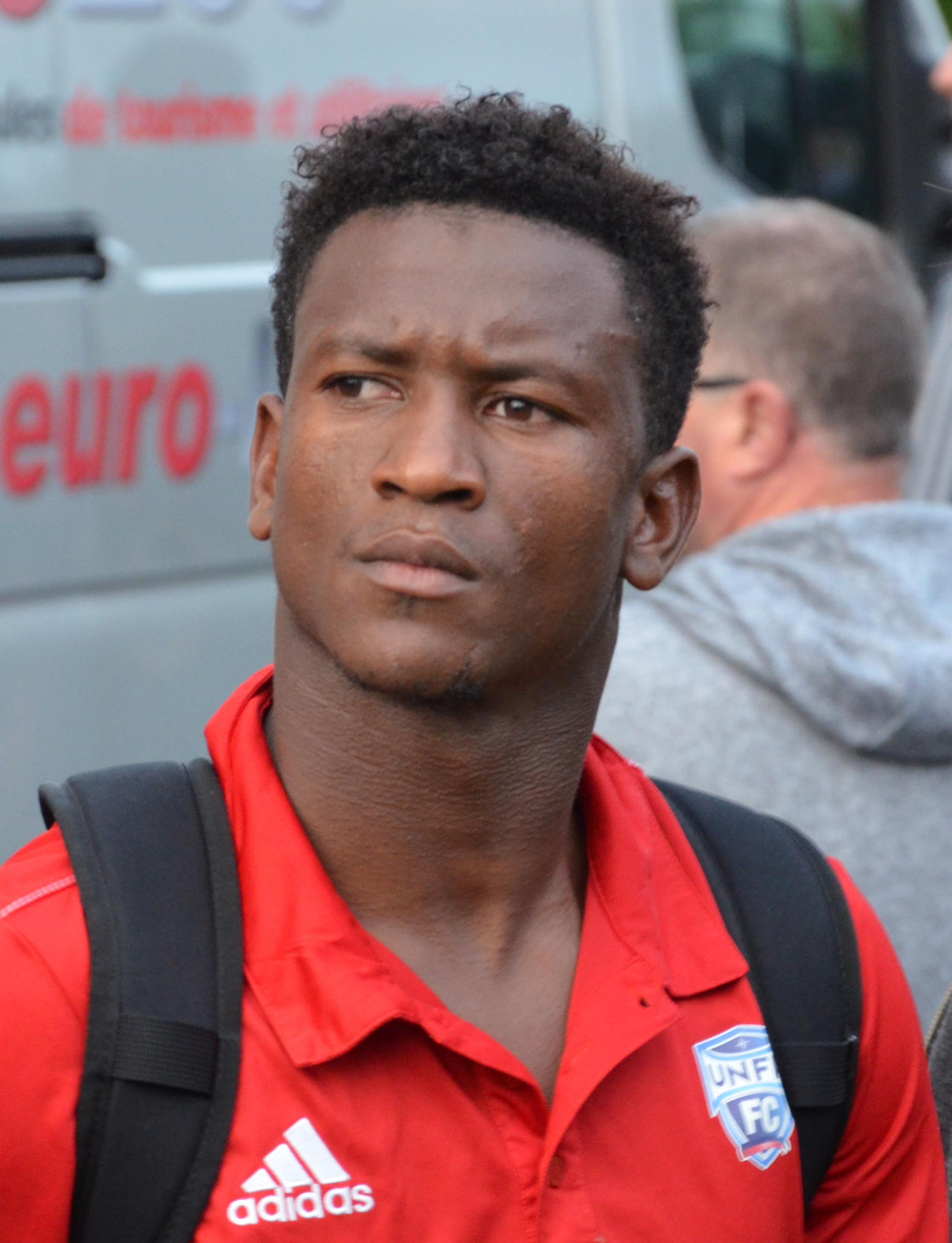
- Cissé in 2016

Personal information
- Date of birth: 13 February 1996 (age 30)
- Place of birth: Conakry, Guinea
- Height: 1.81 m (5 ft 11 in)
- Position: Defender

Team information
- Current team: Tobol
- Number: 13

Senior career*
Years	Team	Apps	(Gls)
2013–2014	Fello Star		
2014–2016	Angers	0	(0)
2014–2016	Angers B	17	(2)
2016–2017	Martigues	16	(1)
2017–2020	Schiltigheim	73	(4)
2020–2021	Novi Pazar	31	(6)
2021–2022	Kocaelispor	15	(1)
2022	→ Menemenspor (loan)	12	(2)
2022–2023	Tuzlaspor	14	(2)
2023–2024	Novi Pazar	30	(1)
2024	Hapoel Hadera	16	(0)
2025–2026	Novi Pazar	28	(5)
2026–	Tobol	18	(0)

International career^{‡}
2016	Guinea U20	4	(0)
2014–	Guinea	18	(1)
- * Club domestic league appearances and goals as of 1 November 2026 ‡ National team caps and goals as of 9 October 2021

Abdoulaye Cissé (born 13 February 1996) is a Guinean professional footballer who plays as a defender for Kazakhstan Premier League club Tobol.

== Club career ==
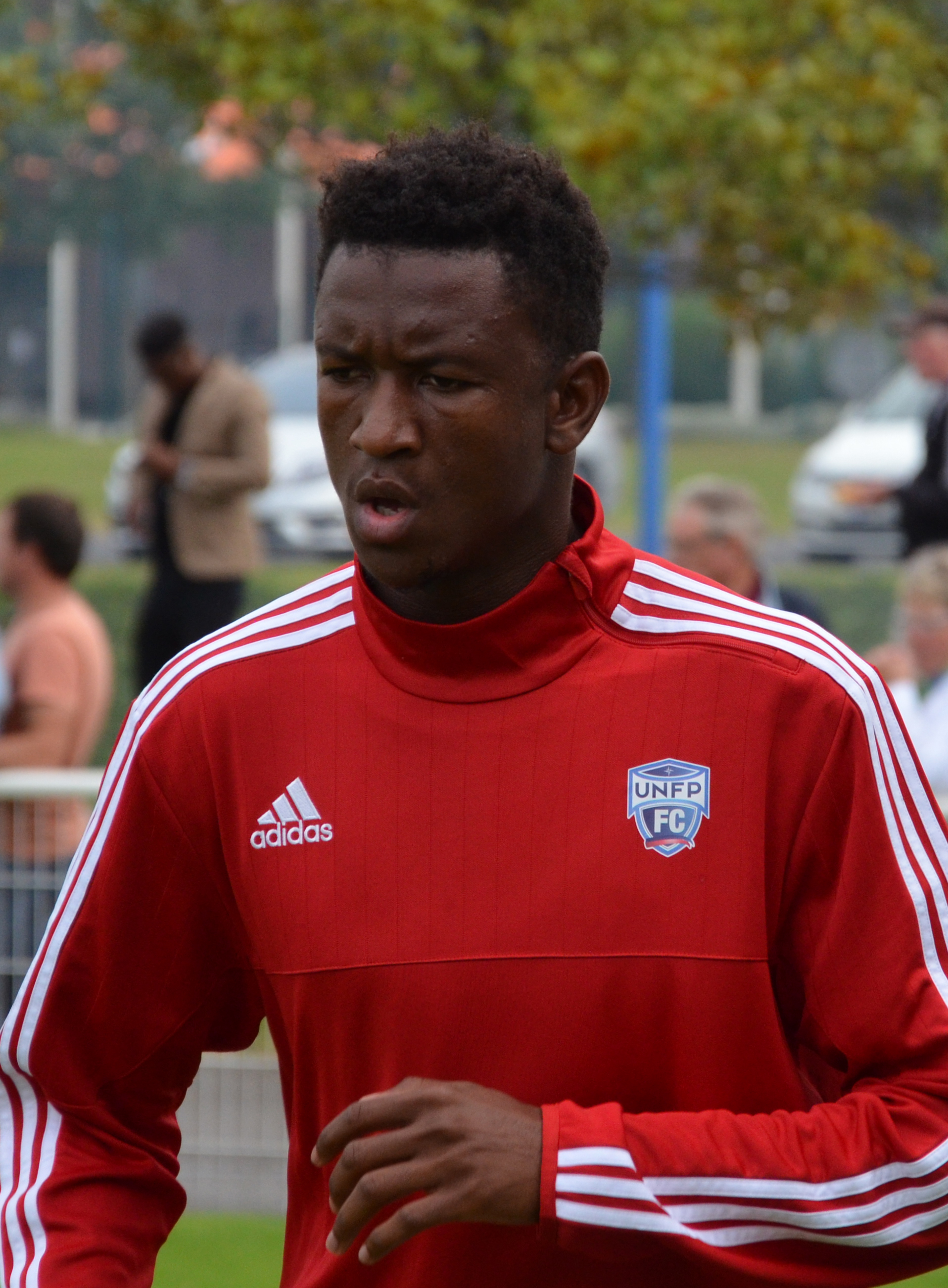

Cissé started playing as a senior in 2013 with Fello Star at Guinée Championnat National. By 2014, he was already in France and signed with Angers, having spent two seasons playing in their reserves team. In 2016, he signed with Martigues and played with them in the 2016–17 Championnat de France Amateur. In 2017, Cissé joined another French side, Schiltigheim, where he stayed until 2020.

In summer 2020, he received an invitation on behalf of his national teammate Seydouba Soumah, to come to his club, Partizan, on trials. Although he left a good impression, the foreigners limit made it hard for him to join Partizan, so he joined another Serbian top-league side, Novi Pazar. He signed a one-year contract with Novi Pazar on 3 August 2020.

== International career ==
Cissé has been part of the Guinea national team since 2014.
