= Luis Guerra =

Venezuelan footballer

Personal information
- Full name: Luis Alejandro Guerra Romero
- Date of birth: 20 November 1996 (age 29)
- Place of birth: San Félix, Bolívar, Venezuela
- Height: 1.68 m (5 ft 6 in)
- Position: Midfielder

Team information
- Current team: Tobol
- Number: 30

Youth career
- Mineros de Guayana

Senior career*
Years	Team	Apps	(Gls)
2014–2016	Mineros de Guayana	43	(4)
2016–2018	Deportivo Táchira	7	(0)
2017	→ Monagas (loan)	24	(1)
2018	→ Aragua (loan)	31	(3)
2019	Carabobo	37	(9)
2020–2024	Deportes Antofagasta	77	(26)
2022	→ Monagas (loan)	21	(0)
2025	Deportes Limache	26	(3)
2026–	Tobol	29	(3)
- * Club domestic league appearances and goals as of 1 November 2026

Luis Alejandro Guerra Romero (born 20 November 1996) is a Venezuelan professional footballer who plays as a midfielder for Kazakh club Tobol.

== Career ==
Guerra began his career with Mineros de Guayana. Later, he played for Deportivo Táchira, Monagas, Aragua and Carabobo in the Venezuelan top division.

In 2020, Guerra moved to Chile and signed with Deportes Antofagasta in the Chilean Primera División. In 2022, he was loaned out to Monagas in his homeland.

In 2025, Guerra signed with Deportes Limache.

In January 2026, Guerra moved to Kazakhstan and signed with Tobol.
