= Uroš Milovanović =

Serbian footballer

Personal information
- Date of birth: 18 October 2000 (age 26)
- Place of birth: Duisburg, Germany
- Height: 1.90 m (6 ft 3 in)
- Position: Forward

Team information
- Current team: Tobol
- Number: 18

Youth career
- OFK Beograd
- 2018–2019: Levante
- 2019–2020: Red Star Belgrade

Senior career*
Years	Team	Apps	(Gls)
2017	OFK Beograd	1	(0)
2019–2020	Red Star Belgrade	0	(0)
2020	→ Grafičar Beograd (loan)	6	(1)
2020	Radnički Niš	3	(0)
2021–2022	Radnik Surdulica	58	(14)
2022–2025	Sporting Gijón	12	(0)
2023–2024	→ TSC (loan)	21	(3)
2024–2025	→ Vizela (loan)	27	(4)
2025–2026	Chaves	18	(0)
2026–	Tobol	30	(12)

International career^{‡}
2018	Serbia U18	1	(3)
2018–2019	Serbia U19	3	(0)
2021-2022	Serbia U21	4	(0)
- * Club domestic league appearances and goals as of 1 November 2026 ‡ National team caps and goals as of 29 March 2022

Uroš Milovanović (Serbian Cyrillic: Урош Миловановић; born 18 October 2000) is a Serbian professional footballer who plays as a forward for Kazakhstan Premier League club Tobol.
