= Nedeljko Piščević =

Serbian footballer

Personal information
- Date of birth: 20 April 1995 (age 31)
- Place of birth: Belgrade, FR Yugoslavia
- Height: 1.91 m (6 ft 3 in)
- Position: Midfielder

Team information
- Current team: Kyzylzhar
- Number: 23

Senior career*
Years	Team	Apps	(Gls)
2013–2017	Sinđelić Beograd	89	(3)
2017–2018	Rad	9	(0)
2018	→ Sinđelić Beograd (loan)	18	(3)
2019–2020	Javor Ivanjica	59	(5)
2021–2022	Riga FC	23	(0)
2022	Radnički Kragujevac	14	(1)
2022–2023	Borac Banja Luka	27	(3)
2023–2025	CSKA 1948	30	(5)
2023–2025	CSKA 1948 II	5	(1)
2025	Budućnost	25	(2)
2026–	Kyzylzhar	24	(1)
- * Club domestic league appearances and goals as of 1 November 2026

Nedeljko Piščević (born 20 April 1995) is a Serbian football midfielder who plays for Kazakhstani club Kyzylzhar.

He made his Serbian Super Liga debut with FK Rad in July 2017.
