= Miroslav Romashchenko =

Russian football manager (born 1973)

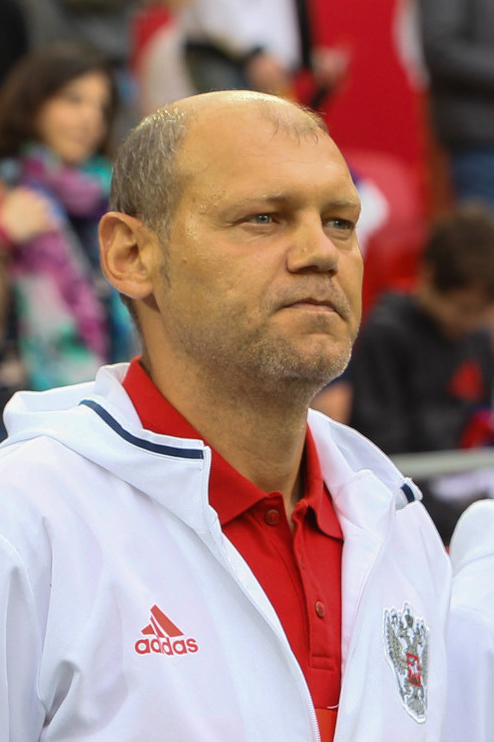
- Romashchenko coaching Russia in 2017

Personal information
- Full name: Miroslav Yuryevich Romashchenko
- Date of birth: 16 December 1973 (age 52)
- Place of birth: Pavlohrad, Ukrainian SSR
- Height: 1.87 m (6 ft 2 in)
- Position: Midfielder

Team information
- Current team: Tobol (manager)

Senior career*
Years	Team	Apps	(Gls)
1990–1991	Shakhtar Pavlohrad	19	(2)
1991	Dnepr Dnepropetrovsk	0	(0)
1992	Vedrich Rechitsa	24	(8)
1993	Dnepr Mogilev	29	(26)
1994–1996	Uralmash Yekaterinburg	62	(12)
1997–1998	Spartak Moscow	42	(7)
1999	Spartak-2 Moscow	1	(0)
Total		177	(55)

International career
1992	Belarus U21	1	(0)
1994–1998	Belarus	15	(1)

Managerial career
- 2002–2003: Spartak Moscow (academy)
- 2006–2008: Spartak Moscow (reserves)
- 2008: Tom Tomsk
- 2010: Salyut Belgorod
- 2023–2024: Akhmat Grozny
- 2025: Ural Yekaterinburg
- 2026–: Tobol
- * Club domestic league appearances and goals

Miroslav Yuryevich Romashchenko (Belarusian: Міраслаў Юр'евіч Рамашчанка; Russian: Мирослав Юрьевич Ромащенко; born 16 December 1973) is a Belarusian professional football manager and former player who is currently in charge of Kazakhstan Premier League club Tobol.

== Playing career ==
Born and raised in the Ukrainian SSR, Romashchenko began his career in football as a player in his native town of Pavlohrad (Dnipropetrovsk region), first representing the local team Shakhtar and then the reserves of FC Dnipro. In 1992, shortly after the dissolution of the Soviet Union, Romashchenko moved to Belarus and signed with Vedrich Rechista (Gomel region), competing in the inaugural season of the country's highest league. In early 1993, amid the 1992–93 season, he moved to Dnepr Mogilev, where he played for the second part of season and the rest of the year. During this time, he established himself as a prominent goalscorer, with 26 goals in 29 games, including four hat-tricks. The senior national team of Belarus expressed interest in him representing the country and he applied for citizenship, with his younger brother following suit as well.

In 1994, he transferred to FC Uralmash Yekaterinburg, competing in the Russian Premier League. After three seasons with the club, he signed with Spartak Moscow, the country's most popular and decorated club at the time. Due to fierce competition in attacking positions, Romashchenko was assigned the role of a ball-playing defender or a defensive midfielder. In his first season with Spartak, he won the league and reached the semi-finals of the 1997–98 UEFA Cup, losing out to the eventual champions Inter Milan. In his second season, he became the second-time league champion, won the national cup undefeated with a five-game clean sheet, and made his debut in the UEFA Champions League, playing the group stage home and away games against Inter Milan despite his knee's precarious condition.

Two major knee injuries sustained during the 1998 season had forced Romashchenko to have his knee operated six times. Unable to recover enough fitness for competitive football for over two years since his last game, he retired from playing in early 2002 and went into coaching.

== Coaching career ==
As a coach, Romashchenko worked closely with Stanislav Cherchesov, following him as an assistant coach at Zhemchuzhina-Sochi, Terek Grozny, Amkar Perm, Dynamo Moscow, Legia Warsaw, Russia national team and Ferencváros.

After 12 years as Cherchesov's assistant, on 18 August 2023 Romashchenko was hired as the manager of Russian Premier League club Akhmat Grozny, with a three-year contract. He resigned from Akhmat on 4 April 2024.

On 23 June 2025, Romashchenko was appointed manager of Ural Yekaterinburg. He left Ural by mutual consent on 8 December 2025. On 22 April 2026, he became the head coach of FC Tobol, replacing Nurbol Zhumaskaliev, for whom he had worked as a consultant from the beginning of that month.

== Style of play ==
Romashchenko was known as a versatile player, capable of playing in multiple positions and roles; having started his career in Belarus as an attacking midfielder and a striker, he was gradually moved down the pitch as his career progressed, with a defensive midfielder and a center back becoming his regular positions at Spartak and the national team. Predominantly left-footed, he had a powerful shot from distance, which helped him score a number of goals, including free kicks.

== Personal life ==
His brother Maksim Romaschenko and his son Nikita Romashchenko were both professional footballers as well.

== International ==
Scores and results list Belarus' goal tally first, score column indicates score after each Romashchenko goal.

List of international goals scored by Miroslav Romashchenko
No.	Date	Venue	Opponent	Score	Result	Competition
1	12 October 1994	Dinamo Stadium (Minsk), Minsk, Belarus	Luxembourg	1–0	2–0	UEFA Euro 1996 qualifying

== Honours ==
Spartak Moscow

- Russian Premier League: 1997, 1998
- Russian Cup: 1997–98
