= 2022 FC Kairat season =

FC Kairat
2022 season
- Chairman: Kairat Boranbayev
- Manager: Kurban Berdyev (until 6 June); Kirill Keker (from 8 June)
- Stadium: Central Stadium
- Premier League: 4th
- Kazakhstan Cup: Quarterfinal vs Akzhayik
- Super Cup: Runners-up
- Europa Conference League: Second qualifying round vs Kisvárda
- Top goalscorer: League: João Paulo (11); All: João Paulo (14)
- Highest home attendance: 17,182 vs Kisvárda (21 July 2022)
- Lowest home attendance: 0 vs Aksu (24 July 2021)
- Average home league attendance: 5,158 (30 October 2022)
Home colours	Away colours

The 2022 FC Kairat season was the 12th successive season that the club played in the Kazakhstan Premier League, the highest tier of association football in Kazakhstan, since their promotion back to the top flight in 2009. Kairat finished the Premier League season in 4th position, missing out on European competition for the first time since 2013. In the domestic cups, Kairat reached the Quarterfinals of the Kazakhstan Cup, and where runners-up to Tobol in the season opening Super Cup. In Europe, Kairat entered and were knocked out of the Europa Conference League in the Second qualifying round by Kisvárda.

== Season events ==
On 6 June, Kurban Berdyev left his role as Head Coach by mutual agreement. Two days later, 8 June, Kirill Keker was appointed as his replacement.

== Squad ==
As of match played 6 November 2022

No.	Name	Nationality	Position	Date of birth (age)	Signed from	Signed in	Contract ends	Apps.	Goals
Goalkeepers
1	Danil Ustimenko	(Kazakhstan)	GK	8 August 2000 (aged 22)	Youth Team	2019	2024	45	0
27	Temirlan Anarbekov	(Kazakhstan)	GK	14 October 2003 (aged 19)	Youth Team	2020		5	0
30	Vadim Ulyanov	(Russia)	GK	7 October 2001 (aged 21)	Kairat Moscow	2022		8	0
Defenders
3	Macky Bagnack	(Cameroon)	DF	7 June 1995 (aged 27)	Partizan	2021	2023	34	1
4	Viktor Vasin	(Russia)	DF	6 October 1988 (aged 34)	CSKA Moscow	2022		32	3
5	Sergey Keiler	(Kazakhstan)	DF	11 August 1994 (aged 28)	Okzhetpes	2018	2021	67	3
13	Lev Kurgin	(Kazakhstan)	DF	6 June 2002 (aged 20)	Kairat Moscow	2022		10	0
15	Egor Tkachenko	(Kazakhstan)	DF	14 April 2003 (aged 19)	on loan from Kairat Moscow	2022		8	0
24	Damir Kasabulat	(Kazakhstan)	DF	29 August 2002 (aged 20)	Kairat Moscow	2022		32	0
25	Aleksandr Shirobokov	(Kazakhstan)	DF	2 January 2003 (aged 19)	Academy	2020		12	0
64	Vladislav Kravchenko	(Kazakhstan)	DF	15 April 2002 (aged 20)	Academy	2021		2	0
81	Aleksandr Mrynskiy	(Kazakhstan)	DF	15 July 2004 (aged 18)	Academy	2022		3	0
Midfielders
2	Sultanbek Astanov	(Kazakhstan)	MF	23 March 1999 (aged 23)	Academy	2019		62	3
7	Gulzhigit Alykulov	(Kyrgyzstan)	MF	25 November 2000 (aged 21)	Neman Grodno	2020	2021(+1)	92	12
14	Adam Adakhadzhiev	(Kazakhstan)	MF	23 November 1998 (aged 23)	Academy	2019	2023	21	0
17	Daniyar Usenov	(Kazakhstan)	MF	18 February 2001 (aged 21)	Academy	2020		64	4
20	Anton Krachkovsky	(Russia)	MF	22 June 2002 (aged 20)	CSKA Moscow	2022		28	1
21	Arsen Buranchiev	(Kazakhstan)	MF	12 September 2001 (aged 21)	Academy	2020		48	1
22	Yerkebulan Seydakhmet	(Kazakhstan)	MF	4 February 2000 (aged 22)	Ufa	2019	2022	55	2
23	Andrey Ulshin	(Kazakhstan)	MF	18 April 2000 (aged 22)	Academy	2020		43	4
26	Adilet Sadybekov	(Kazakhstan)	MF	26 May 2002 (aged 20)	Academy	2021		22	2
28	Rustam Emirov	(Kazakhstan)	MF	14 September 2000 (aged 22)	Kairat Moscow	2022		5	0
84	Nazar Al-Khadzh	(Kazakhstan)	MF	15 July 2004 (aged 18)	Academy	2021		1	0
85	Miras Omatay	(Kazakhstan)	MF	15 July 2004 (aged 18)	Academy	2021		2	0
86	Miras Kobeev	(Kazakhstan)	MF	9 June 2004 (aged 18)	Academy	2022		2	0
Forwards
11	João Paulo	(Brazil)	FW	2 June 1988 (aged 34)	Ordabasy	2021	2022	47	15
18	Vyacheslav Shvyryov	(Kazakhstan)	FW	7 January 2001 (aged 21)	Academy	2018		60	7
19	Artur Shushenachev	(Kazakhstan)	FW	7 April 1998 (aged 24)	Academy	2017	2022(+1)	99	37
29	Aybar Abdulla	(Kazakhstan)	FW	22 January 2002 (aged 19)	Kairat Moscow	2022		8	0
47	Alisher Rakhimzhanov	(Kazakhstan)	FW	28 December 2003 (aged 18)	Academy	2021		3	0
73	Nurgeldy Toleukhanov	(Kazakhstan)	FW	8 November 2003 (aged 18)	Academy	2022		1	0
83	Yan Trufanov	(Kazakhstan)	FW	17 May 2004 (aged 18)	Academy	2022		1	0
Players away on loan
4	Nuraly Alip	(Kazakhstan)	DF	22 December 1999 (aged 22)	Academy	2018	2023	103	5
74	Galymzhan Kenzhebek	(Kazakhstan)	FW	12 February 2003 (aged 19)	Academy	2020		3	0
Players that left during the season
6	Jacek Góralski	(Poland)	MF	21 September 1992 (aged 30)	Ludogorets Razgrad	2020	2022	37	0
8	Jasurbek Jaloliddinov	(Uzbekistan)	MF	15 May 2002 (aged 20)	on loan from Lokomotiv Tashkent	2022	2022	7	0
10	Streli Mamba	(Germany)	FW	17 June 1994 (aged 28)	SC Paderborn	2021	2022	13	2
16	Ricardo Alves	(Portugal)	MF	25 March 1993 (aged 29)	Krylia Sovetov	2021	2022	36	3
11	Yan Vorogovsky	(Kazakhstan)	MF	7 August 1996 (aged 26)	K Beerschot VA	2021		91	3
18	José Kanté	(Guinea)	FW	27 September 1990 (aged 32)	Legia Warsaw	2021	2022	52	23

== Transfers ==
=== In ===
Date	Position	Nationality	Name	From	Fee	Ref.
22 February 2022	DF	(Russia)	Viktor Vasin	CSKA Moscow	Undisclosed	
25 February 2022	DF	(Kazakhstan)	Damir Kasabulat	Kairat Moscow	Undisclosed	
25 February 2022	FW	(Kazakhstan)	Vyacheslav Shvyryov	Kairat Moscow	Undisclosed	
26 February 2022	GK	(Russia)	Vadim Ulyanov	Kairat Moscow	Undisclosed	
9 March 2022	MF	(Russia)	Anton Krachkovsky	CSKA Moscow	Undisclosed	
15 March 2022	DF	(Cameroon)	David Ekwe	OFTA Kribi	Undisclosed	
14 June 2022	MF	(Kazakhstan)	Adilet Sadybekov	Kairat Moscow	Undisclosed	
17 June 2022	DF	(Kazakhstan)	Lev Kurgin	Kairat Moscow	Undisclosed	
17 June 2022	FW	(Kazakhstan)	Bayzhan Madelkhan	Kairat Moscow	Undisclosed	
21 June 2022	GK	(Kazakhstan)	Nikita Pivkin	Kairat Moscow	Undisclosed	
23 June 2022	MF	(Kazakhstan)	Rustam Emirov	Kairat Moscow	Undisclosed	

=== Loans in ===
Date from	Position	Nationality	Name	To	Date to	Ref.
6 February 2022	MF	(Uzbekistan)	Jasurbek Jaloliddinov	Lokomotiv Tashkent	17 June 2022	
26 February 2022	DF	(Kazakhstan)	Egor Tkachenko	Kairat Moscow	End of season	

=== Out ===
Date	Position	Nationality	Name	To	Fee	Ref.
27 February 2022	MF	(Kazakhstan)	Aybol Abiken	Aksu	Undisclosed	
1 July 2022	MF	(Kazakhstan)	Yan Vorogovsky	RWDM	Undisclosed	
18 July 2022	MF	(Portugal)	Ricardo Alves	Tractor	Undisclosed	

=== Loans out ===
Date from	Position	Nationality	Name	To	Date to	Ref.
18 January 2022	MF	(Kazakhstan)	Yan Vorogovsky	RWDM	1 July 2022	
16 February 2022	MF	(Kazakhstan)	Nuraly Alip	Zenit St.Petersburg	End of season	
22 February 2022	DF	(Kazakhstan)	Aleksandr Shirobokov	Kairat Moscow	17 June 2022	
1 July 2022	MF	(Kazakhstan)	Alen Aimanov	Turan	End of season	
1 July 2022	FW	(Kazakhstan)	Bayzhan Madelkhan	Murom	28 June 2023	
7 July 2022	GK	(Kazakhstan)	Nikita Pivkin	Elektron Veliky Novgorod	End of season	

=== Released ===
Date	Position	Nationality	Name	Joined	Date	Ref.
19 January 2022	GK	(Kazakhstan)	Stas Pokatilov	Aktobe	1 February 2022	
19 January 2022	DF	(Belarus)	Dzyanis Palyakow	Astana	18 February 2022	
19 January 2022	DF	(Kazakhstan)	Gafurzhan Suyumbayev	Aksu	25 January 2022	
19 January 2022	MF	(Armenia)	Kamo Hovhannisyan	Astana	19 January 2022	
16 June 2022	MF	(Poland)	Jacek Góralski	VfL Bochum	17 June 2022	
11 July 2022	FW	(Germany)	Streli Mamba	Dalian Professional	21 August 2022	
23 August 2022	FW	(Guinea)	José Kanté	Cangzhou Mighty Lions	27 August 2022	
31 December 2022	DF	(Cameroon)	David Ekwe			
31 December 2022	FW	(Kazakhstan)	Alisher Rakhimzhanov	Khan Tengri		

== Friendlies ==
2022	–
(UTC+6)

== Competitions ==
=== Overview ===
Competition	First match	Last match	Starting round	Final position	Record							
Competition	First match	Last match	Starting round	Final position	Pld	W	D	L	GF	GA	GD	Win %
Premier League	12 March 2022	6 November 2022	Matchday 1	4th	26	12	6	8	34	36	−2	46.15
Kazakhstan Cup	9 July 2022	31 August 2022	Group Stage	Quarterfinal	7	5	1	1	16	8	+8	71.43
Super Cup	2 March 2022	2 March 2022	Final	Runners-up	1	0	0	1	1	2	−1	0.00
UEFA Europa Conference League	21 July 2022	28 July 2022	Second Qualifying Round	Second Qualifying Round	2	0	0	2	0	2	−2	0.00
Total					36	17	7	12	51	48	+3	47.22

Last updated: 6 November 2022
Source: Competitions

=== Super Cup ===
2 March 2022	Tobol	2 – 1	Kairat	Nur-Sultan
19:30 (UTC+6)	Muzhikov 30' (pen.) (yellow card) 79'; Jovančić (yellow card) 60'; Zhaksylykov 83'	Report	Paulo 39'; Seydakhmet (yellow card) 60'	Stadium: Astana Arena; Attendance: 6,000; Referee: Daniyar Sakhi

=== Premier League ===
==== Results summary ====
Overall								Home						Away					
Pld	W	D	L	GF	GA	GD	Pts	W	D	L	GF	GA	GD	W	D	L	GF	GA	GD
26	12	6	8	34	36	−2	42	6	2	5	15	15	0	6	4	3	19	21	−2

Last updated: 6 November 2022.
Source: See Results

==== Results by round ====
Round	1	2	3	4	5	6	7	8	9	10	11	12	13	14	15	16	17	18	19	20	21	22	23	24	25	26
Ground	H	A	H	A	H	A	H	A	H	H	A	H	H	A	H	A	A	H	A	H	A	A	H	A	H	A
Result	W	W	D	D	W	D	L	W	D	L	L	W	W	D	W	W	D	L	W	L	W	W	L	W	W	L
Position																										

Source: See Results
A = Away; H = Home; W = Win; D = Draw; L = Loss

==== League table ====
Pos	Team	Pld	W	D	L	GF	GA	GD	Pts	Qualification or relegation
2	Aktobe	26	16	4	6	43	28	+15	52	Qualification for the Europa Conference League second qualifying round
3	Tobol	26	14	5	7	46	33	+13	47	Qualification for the Europa Conference League first qualifying round
4	Kairat	26	12	6	8	34	36	−2	42	
5	Ordabasy (Note: Qualified as cup winners)	26	11	5	10	36	39	−3	38	Qualification for the Europa Conference League second qualifying round
6	Aksu	26	11	3	12	32	37	−5	36	

Source: UEFA, Soccerway
Rules for classification: 1) Points; 2) Goal difference; 3) Matches won; 4) Goals scored; 5) Away goals scored; 6) Head-to-head points; 7) Head-to-head matches won; 8) Head-to-head goal difference; 9) Head-to-head goals scored; 10) Head-to-head away goals scored; 11) Draw.

==== Results ====
6 March 2022 1	Kairat	2–0	Aktobe	Almaty
15:00 (UTC+6)	Kanté 67' (pen.), 83' (yellow card) 83'; Góralski (yellow card) 36'	Report	Orazov (yellow card) 7'	Stadium: Central Stadium; Attendance: 9,200; Referee: Grigory Moskovchenko

11 March 2022 2	Maktaaral	0–1	Kairat	Turkistan
17:00 (UTC+6)	Potapov (yellow card) 45'; Yudenkov (yellow card) 45+4'; Sebaihi (yellow card) 68' (yellow-red card) 78'	Report	Kanté 26' (pen.) (yellow card) 90+1'; Seydakhmet (yellow card) 29'; Bagnack (yellow card) 45+5'	Stadium: Turkistan Arena; Attendance: 1,000; Referee: Sayat Karabaev

17 March 2022 3	Kairat	1–1	Taraz	Almaty
17:00 (UTC+6)	Seydakhmet (yellow card) 35'; Kanté 59'	Report	Shakhmetov (yellow card) 27'; D.Karaman 68'	Stadium: Central Stadium; Attendance: 3,400; Referee: Denis Izmailov

4 April 2022 4	Akzhayik	0–0	Kairat	Oral
16:00 (UTC+6)	B.Omarov (yellow card) 22'; Pryndeta (yellow card) 57' (yellow-red card) 88'	Report	Jaloliddinov (yellow card) 51'	Stadium: Petr Atoyan Stadium; Attendance: 1,500; Referee: Anton Kuchma

9 April 2022 5	Kairat	1–0	Caspiy	Almaty
19:00 (UTC+6)	Paulo 41'; Ustimenko (yellow card) 89'; Kanté (yellow card) 90+3'	Report	N.Ayazbaev (yellow card) 90+3'	Stadium: Central Stadium; Attendance: 3,700; Referee: Timur Kumashev

16 April 2022 6	Tobol	2–2	Kairat	Kostanay
20:00 (UTC+6)	Tagybergen (penalty missed) 34'; Malyi 45+2'; Tošić 72'	Report	Kanté 8'; Jaloliddinov (yellow card) 45+1'; Seydakhmet (yellow card) 84'; A.Buranchiev (red card) 90+5'; Vasilyev 90+7' (o.g.)	Stadium: Central Stadium; Attendance: 3,000; Referee: Artem Kuchin

23 April 2022 7	Kairat	0–1	Turan	Almaty
19:00 (UTC+6)	A.Ulshin (yellow card) 23'; Kasabulat (yellow card) 27'; Vasin (yellow card) 41'; Alykulov (yellow card) 77'; Paulo (yellow card) 86'	Report	Nurgaliyev 31' (pen.) (yellow card) 80'; Kleshchenko (yellow card) 32'; Kerimzhanov (yellow card) 72'; Zaleski (yellow card) 79'; Diakate (yellow card) 84'	Stadium: Central Stadium; Attendance: 2,800; Referee: Sayat Karabaev

26 April 2022 8	Ordabasy	2–1	Kairat	Shymkent
18:00 (UTC+6)	A.Dobay (yellow card) 5'; Astanov 11' (pen.) (yellow card) 67'; M.Vaganov (yellow card) 45+1'; Nyuiadzi 52'; Sadovsky (yellow card) 86'	Report	E.Tkachenko (yellow card) 10'; Shushenachev 31'; Ustimenko (yellow card) 45'; Alves (penalty missed) 76'	Stadium: Kazhymukan Munaitpasov Stadium; Attendance: 6,500; Referee: Saken Bayimbet

2 May 2022 9	Kairat	1–1	Kyzylzhar	Almaty
19:00 (UTC+6)	Alves (red card) 6'; Astanov 45'	Report	Bushman (yellow card) 32'; R.Yesimov (yellow card) 36'; Zorić 64'; Gian (yellow card) 73'; Koné (yellow card) 89'	Stadium: Central Stadium; Attendance: 2733; Referee: Grigory Moskovchenko

7 May 2022 10	Kairat	0–3	Atyrau	Almaty
20:00 (UTC+6)	A.Ulshin (red card) 21'; Shvyryov (yellow card) 68'	Report	Tarasov 15', 39'; A.Nabikhanov (yellow card) 17'; Filipović 45+2'	Stadium: Central Stadium; Attendance: 4,000; Referee: Sergey Nozhenko

14 May 2022 11	Astana	6–0	Kairat	Nur-Sultan
18:00 (UTC+6)	Manzorro (yellow card) 16'; Tomasov 19', 44', 63'; Vloet 36'; Eugénio 48', 70'; Hovhannisyan (yellow card) 77'	Report	Góralski 33'; Astanov (yellow card) 49'; Seydakhmet (yellow card) 57'; Jaloliddinov (yellow card) 60'	Stadium: Astana Arena; Attendance: 12,500; Referee: Alexander Gauser

21 May 2022 12	Kairat	2–0	Shakhter Karagandy	Almaty
19:00 (UTC+6)	S.Keiler (yellow card) 9'; Vasin 15'; Kanté (yellow card) 54'; Paulo 85'	Report	Dosmagambetov (yellow card) 22'; Graf (yellow card) 83'	Stadium: Central Stadium; Attendance: 4,200; Referee: Denis Tevyashov

19 June 2022 14	Kairat	1–0	Maktaaral	Almaty
19:00 (UTC+6)	Vasin 70'; S.Keiler (yellow card) 82'; Alykulov (yellow card) 90+1'	Report		Stadium: Central Stadium; Attendance: 5,774; Referee: Aidyn Tasybaev

26 June 2022 15	Taraz	1–1	Kairat	Taraz
19:00 (UTC+6)	Kozhamberdy (yellow card) 38'; Gamakov (yellow card) 43'; Baytana 45+1'; Akhmetov (yellow card) 52'	Report	Shushenachev 8'; Kanté (yellow card) 45+3'	Stadium: Central Stadium; Attendance: 6,800; Referee: Bulat Sariev

3 July 2022 16	Kairat	2–0	Akzhayik	Almaty
21:00 (UTC+6)	Astanov (yellow card) 9' Kanté 36'; Paulo 54'; Vasin (yellow card) 59'; Shvyryov (yellow card) 89'	Report	Sabino (yellow card) 40'	Stadium: Central Stadium; Attendance: 3,700; Referee: Georgy Chekhovsky

21 August 2022 13	Aksu	1–2	Kairat	Pavlodar
21:00 (UTC+6)	A.Krasotin (yellow card) 21'; M.Turlybek 78' (pen.) (yellow card) 87'	Report	Shushenachev 8'; Krachkovsky 24'; Astanov (yellow card) 77'; Kasabulat (yellow card) 88'; S.Keiler (yellow card) 90+5'	Stadium: Central Stadium; Attendance: 3,200; Referee: Bolat Karlibaev

27 August 2022 17	Caspiy	2–2	Kairat	Aktau
19:00 (UTC+6)	Narzildayev (yellow card) 29'; Nurgaliyev (yellow card) 37'; Kireyenko 76'; Pešić 77'; Y.Kadyrbaev (yellow card) 87'	Report	Shushenachev 14'; S.Keiler (yellow card) 38'; Shvyryov 45+2'; Sadybekov (yellow card) 45+2'; Seydakhmet (yellow card) 79'; Alykulov (yellow card) 90'	Stadium: Zhastar Stadium; Attendance: 3,000; Referee: Bulat Sariev

5 September 2022 18	Kairat	2–3	Tobol	Almaty
19:00 (UTC+6)	Astanov (yellow card) 50'; Shushenachev 53'; Alykulov 90+1' (pen.) (yellow card) 90+1'	Report	Sergeyev 26', 77'; Zhaksylykov 42'; Akmurzin (yellow card) 90+1'	Stadium: Central Stadium; Attendance: 6,200; Referee: Saken Bayimbet

11 September 2022 19	Turan	1–3	Kairat	Turkistan
20:00 (UTC+6)	Kerimzhanov (yellow card) 17' (goal) 78'	Report	A.Ulshin (yellow card) 6'; Paulo 33', 41', 60'; Bagnack (yellow card) 87'; Ustimenko (yellow card) 90'; Usenov (yellow card) 90+1'	Stadium: Turkistan Arena; Attendance: 2,500; Referee: Aidyn Tasybaev

15 September 2022 20	Kairat	1–2	Ordabasy	Almaty
19:00 (UTC+6)	Paulo 45'	Report	Fedin 8'; Sultanov (yellow card) 29'; Bakhtiyarov 87'; Baradzin (yellow card) 90+1'	Stadium: Central Stadium; Attendance: 5,000; Referee: Grigory Moskovchenko

2 October 2022 21	Kyzylzhar	1–2	Kairat	Petropavl
15:00 (UTC+6)	Lobjanidze 33' (yellow card) 81'; T.Muldinov (yellow card) 45'	Report	Paulo 19'; Astanov (yellow card) 21'; A.Buranchiev (yellow card) 42'; Shvyryov 90+3'	Stadium: Karasai Stadium; Attendance: 3,200; Referee: Denis Tevyashov

9 October 2022 22	Atyrau	1–2	Kairat	Atyrau
16:00 (UTC+6)	Matheus (penalty missed) 37'; Filipović 47'; Baranowski (yellow card) 90+7'	Report	Shushenachev 20'; Bagnack (yellow card) 38'; Sadybekov (yellow card) 38' (yellow-red card) 53'; Shvyryov (yellow card) 56'; Paulo 64' (pen.); R.Emirov (yellow card) 90+2'	Stadium: Munaishy Stadium; Attendance: 1,500; Referee: Bulat Sariev

15 October 2022 23	Kairat	0–4	Astana	Almaty
17:00 (UTC+6)	Bagnack (yellow card) 24' (yellow-red card) 87'; A.Ulshin (yellow card) 35'; Ustimenko (yellow card) 90+4'	Report	Tomasov (penalty missed) 6'; Dosmagambetov 11', 59', 88' (pen.), 90'; Aymbetov (yellow card) 45'; Kuat (yellow card) 76'; Ebong (yellow card) 90+1'	Stadium: Central Stadium; Attendance: 14,000; Referee: Denis Tevyashov

23 October 2022 24	Shakhter Karagandy	0–2	Kairat	Karaganda
14:00 (UTC+6)	M.Sapanov (yellow card) 38'; Bukorac (yellow card) 50'; Kobzar (yellow card) 56'	Report	Shushenachev 41', 76'; L.Kurgin (yellow card) 65'; Usenov (yellow card) 90+4'	Stadium: Shakhter Stadium; Attendance: 1,000; Referee: Sayat Karabaev

30 October 2022 25	Kairat	2–0	Aksu	Almaty
15:00 (UTC+6)	Astanov (yellow card) 43'; Paulo 60' (pen.); A.Buranchiev (yellow card) 74'; Sadybekov (yellow card) 83'; Alykulov 89'	Report	Zličić (yellow card) 44'; R.Esimov (yellow card) 45+2'	Stadium: Central Stadium; Attendance: 3,000; Referee: Bulat Sariev

6 November 2022 26	Aktobe	4–1	Kairat	Aktobe
15:00 (UTC+6)	Shomko (yellow card) 13'; Kasym 41' (pen.); China 45+2', 45+4'; A.Tanzharikov (yellow card) 47'; Kenesov 69' (yellow card) 71'	Report	Shvyryov (yellow card) 13'; L.Kurgin (yellow card) 27'; Paulo 33' (yellow card) 45+7'	Stadium: Central Stadium; Attendance: 13,400; Referee: Artem Kuchin

=== Kazakhstan Cup ===
==== Group stage ====
Pos	Team	Pld	W	D	L	GF	GA	GD	Pts	Qualification
1	Kairat (A)	6	5	1	0	15	6	+9	16	Advanced to Quarterfinals
2	Ordabasy (A)	6	3	0	3	9	8	+1	9	Advanced to Quarterfinals
3	Atyrau	6	2	1	3	6	11	−5	7	
4	Aksu	6	0	2	4	3	8	−5	2	

Updated to match(es) played on 13 August 2022. Source: PFLK
(A) Advance to a further round

9 July 2022 1	Kairat	2 – 0	Ordabasy	Almaty
19:00 (UTC+6)	Paulo 18'; A.Ulshin (yellow card) 20'; Sadybekov 48'; S.Keiler (yellow card) 67'; Kanté (yellow card) 90+6'	Report		Stadium: Central Stadium; Attendance: 3,648; Referee: Sayat Karabaev

15 July 2022 2	Atyrau	2 – 3	Kairat	Atyrau
19:00 (UTC+6)	Matheus 16', 83'; Takulov (yellow card) 45+1'; A.Nabikhanov (yellow card) 71'	Report	Ustimenko (red card) 12'; A.Ulshin 19' (yellow card) 81'; Sadybekov 43'; Vasin 57'; Shushenachev (yellow card) 82'	Stadium: Munaishy Stadium; Attendance: 3,000; Referee: Aleksandr Zatula

24 July 2022 3	Kairat	3 – 2	Aksu	Almaty
21:00 (UTC+6)	Shvyryov 37'; Shushenachev 58'; A.Shirobokov (yellow card) 72'; Alykulov 79'	Report	A.Smailov 55'; I.Zhilov (yellow card) 60'; Suyumbayev (yellow card) 78'; M.Turlybek 90+1'	Stadium: Central Stadium; Attendance: 0 Referee: Sergey Nozhenko

31 July 2022 4	Aksu	1 – 1	Kairat	Pavlodar
21:00 (UTC+6)	D.Marat 1'; U.Zhaksybayev (yellow card) 30'; A.Popov (yellow card) 58'; A.Skvortsov (yellow card) 61'; A.Kakimov (yellow card) 66'; A.Smailov (yellow card) 75'	Report	Seydakhmet 24' (yellow card) 66'; A.Shirobokov (yellow card) 63'; V.Ulyanov (red card) 83'	Stadium: Central Stadium; Attendance: 0 Referee: Aleksandr Gauzer

7 August 2022 5	Ordabasy	1 – 3	Kairat	Shymkent
21:00 (UTC+6)	Dinga (yellow card) 16'; Nyuiadzi 62'	Report	Paulo 3'; Usenov (yellow card) 43'; Shushenachev 71'; Alykulov 86'	Stadium: Kazhymukan Munaitpasov Stadium; Attendance: 9,500; Referee: Anton Kuchma

13 August 2022 6	Kairat	3 – 0	Atyrau	Almaty
21:00 (UTC+6)	S.Keiler 8'; Usenov 24'; A.Buranchiev (yellow card) 81'; Shvyryov 90+7'	Report	Takulov (yellow card) 55'; Baranowski (yellow card) 77'; Matheus (yellow card) 87' (red card) 90+6'; A.Seytkaliev (yellow card) 89'	Stadium: Central Stadium; Attendance: 2,000; Referee: Artyom Kuchin

==== Knockout stages ====
31 August 2022 Quarterfinal	Kairat	1 – 2	Akzhayik	Almaty
19:00 (UTC+6)	Paulo (yellow card) 9'; S.Keiler (yellow card) 22' (goal) 78'; Shvyryov (yellow card) 42' (yellow-red card) 45+1'; Astanov (yellow card) 59'	Report	B.Omarov (yellow card) 35'; Pryndeta (yellow card) 77'; Vasin 87' (o.g.); Omirtayev 90'	Stadium: Central Stadium; Attendance: 2,300; Referee: Alexander Gauzer

=== UEFA Europa Conference League ===
==== Qualifying rounds ====
21 July 2022 Second qualifying round 1st leg	Kairat (Kazakhstan)	0 – 1	(Hungary) Kisvárda	Almaty, Kazakhstan
20:00 (UTC+6)		Report	Asani 82'	Stadium: Almaty Central Stadium; Attendance: 17,182; Referee: Peter Kjærsgaard-Andersen (Denmark)

28 July 2022 Second qualifying round 2nd leg	Kisvárda (Hungary)	1 – 0 (2 – 0 agg.)	(Kazakhstan) Kairat	Kisvárda, Hungary
22:00 (UTC+6)	Mešanović 39'	Report		Stadium: Várkerti Stadion; Attendance: 2,560; Referee: Chrysovalantis Theouli (Cyprus)

== Squad statistics ==
As of match played 6 November 2022

=== Appearances and goals ===
No.	Pos	Nat	Player	Total		Premier League		Kazakhstan Cup		Super Cup		UEFA Europa Conference League	
No.	Pos	Nat	Player	Apps	Goals	Apps	Goals	Apps	Goals	Apps	Goals	Apps	Goals
1	GK	(Kazakhstan) KAZ	Danil Ustimenko	31	0	24	0	4	0	1	0	2	0
2	MF	(Kazakhstan) KAZ	Sultanbek Astanov	29	1	22	1	5	0	0	0	2	0
3	DF	(Cameroon) CMR	Macky Bagnack	13	0	7+1	0	2	0	1	0	2	0
4	DF	(Russia) RUS	Viktor Vasin	32	3	24	2	5	1	1	0	2	0
5	DF	(Kazakhstan) KAZ	Sergey Keiler	23	2	13+2	0	6	2	1	0	1	0
7	MF	(Kyrgyzstan) KGZ	Gulzhigit Alykulov	26	4	2+16	2	2+3	2	0+1	0	2	0
11	FW	(Brazil) BRA	João Paulo	33	14	26	11	4	2	1	1	2	0
13	DF	(Kazakhstan) KAZ	Lev Kurgin	10	0	5	0	1+3	0	0	0	1	0
14	MF	(Kazakhstan) KAZ	Adam Adakhadzhiev	11	0	0+4	0	2+4	0	0	0	0+1	0
15	DF	(Kazakhstan) KAZ	Egor Tkachenko	8	0	3+2	0	2	0	0	0	0+1	0
17	MF	(Kazakhstan) KAZ	Daniyar Usenov	31	1	7+16	0	5	1	1	0	0+2	0
18	FW	(Kazakhstan) KAZ	Vyacheslav Shvyryov	31	4	7+14	2	5+2	2	0+1	0	0+2	0
19	FW	(Kazakhstan) KAZ	Artur Shushenachev	34	10	22+3	8	4+2	2	0+1	0	1+1	0
20	MF	(Russia) RUS	Anton Krachkovsky	28	1	16+5	1	5	0	0	0	2	0
21	MF	(Kazakhstan) KAZ	Arsen Buranchiev	25	0	16+4	0	1+3	0	1	0	0	0
22	MF	(Kazakhstan) KAZ	Yerkebulan Seydakhmet	23	1	13+5	0	3+1	1	1	0	0	0
23	MF	(Kazakhstan) KAZ	Andrey Ulshin	21	1	13+4	0	2	1	0	0	2	0
24	DF	(Kazakhstan) KAZ	Damir Kasabulat	32	0	21+2	0	5+2	0	0	0	0+2	0
25	DF	(Kazakhstan) KAZ	Aleksandr Shirobokov	4	0	0	0	2	0	0	0	2	0
26	MF	(Kazakhstan) KAZ	Adilet Sadybekov	19	2	10+1	0	5+1	2	0	0	2	0
27	GK	(Kazakhstan) KAZ	Temirlan Anarbekov	2	0	0	0	0+2	0	0	0	0	0
28	MF	(Kazakhstan) KAZ	Rustam Emirov	5	0	1+4	0	0	0	0	0	0	0
29	FW	(Kazakhstan) KAZ	Aybar Abdulla	6	0	1+1	0	0+4	0	0	0	0	0
30	GK	(Russia) RUS	Vadim Ulyanov	8	0	2+3	0	3	0	0	0	0	0
73	MF	(Kazakhstan) KAZ	Nurgaldy Toleukhanov	1	0	0	0	0+1	0	0	0	0	0
81	MF	(Kazakhstan) KAZ	Aleksandr Mrynskiy	1	0	0	0	0+1	0	0	0	0	0
83	FW	(Kazakhstan) KAZ	Yan Trufanov	1	0	0	0	0+1	0	0	0	0	0
86	MF	(Kazakhstan) KAZ	Miras Kobeev	2	0	0	0	2	0	0	0	0	0
Players away from Kairat on loan:
Players who left Kairat during the season:
6	MF	(Poland) POL	Jacek Góralski	8	0	5+2	0	0	0	1	0	0	0
8	MF	(Uzbekistan) UZB	Jasurbek Jaloliddinov	7	0	5+2	0	0	0	0	0	0	0
10	FW	(Guinea) GUI	José Kanté	14	6	8+2	6	2	0	1	0	1	0
16	MF	(Portugal) POR	Ricardo Alves	14	0	13	0	0	0	1	0	0	0

=== Goal scorers ===
Place	Position	Nation	Number	Name	Premier League	Kazakhstan Cup	Super Cup	UEFA Europa Conference League	Total
1	FW	(Brazil)	11	João Paulo	11	2	1	0	14
2	FW	(Kazakhstan)	19	Artur Shushenachev	8	2	0	0	10
3	FW	(Guinea)	10	José Kanté	6	0	0	0	6
4	MF	(Kyrgyzstan)	7	Gulzhigit Alykulov	2	2	0	0	4
4	FW	(Kazakhstan)	18	Vyacheslav Shvyryov	2	2	0	0	4
6	DF	(Russia)	4	Viktor Vasin	2	1	0	0	3
4	DF	(Kazakhstan)	5	Sergey Keiler	0	2	0	0	2
4	MF	(Kazakhstan)	26	Adilet Sadybekov	0	2	0	0	2
7	MF	(Kazakhstan)	2	Sultanbek Astanov	1	0	0	0	1
7	MF	(Russia)	20	Anton Krachkovsky	1	0	0	0	1
7	MF	(Kazakhstan)	23	Andrey Ulshin	0	1	0	0	1
7	MF	(Kazakhstan)	17	Daniyar Usenov	0	1	0	0	1
7	MF	(Kazakhstan)	22	Yerkebulan Seydakhmet	0	1	0	0	1
7				Own goal	1	0	0	0	1
				TOTALS	34	16	1	0	51

=== Clean sheets ===
Place	Position	Nation	Number	Name	Premier League	Kazakhstan Cup	Super Cup	UEFA Europa Conference League	Total
1	GK	(Kazakhstan)	1	Danil Ustimenko	8	1	0	0	9
1	GK	(Russia)	30	Vadim Ulyanov	2	1	0	0	3
				TOTALS	9	2	0	0	11

Danil Ustimenko & Vadim Ulyanov both played in Kairat's 1-0 victory over Maktaaral on 11 March 2022

=== Disciplinary record ===
Number	Nation	Position	Name	Premier League		Kazakhstan Cup		Super Cup		UEFA Europa Conference League		Total	
Number	Nation	Position	Name	Booked	Sent off (straight red)	Booked	Sent off (straight red)	Booked	Sent off (straight red)	Booked	Sent off (straight red)	Booked	Sent off (straight red)
1	(Kazakhstan)	GK	Danil Ustimenko	4	0	0	1	0	0	0	0	4	1
2	(Kazakhstan)	MF	Sultanbek Astanov	6	0	1	0	0	0	1	0	8	0
3	(Cameroon)	DF	Macky Bagnack	5	1	0	0	0	0	1	0	6	1
4	(Russia)	DF	Viktor Vasin	2	0	0	0	0	0	0	0	2	0
5	(Kazakhstan)	DF	Sergey Keiler	4	0	2	0	0	0	0	0	6	0
7	(Kyrgyzstan)	MF	Gulzhigit Alykulov	4	0	0	0	0	0	0	0	4	0
11	(Brazil)	FW	João Paulo	2	0	1	0	0	0	0	0	3	0
13	(Kazakhstan)	DF	Lev Kurgin	2	0	0	0	0	0	0	0	2	0
15	(Kazakhstan)	DF	Egor Tkachenko	1	0	0	0	0	0	0	0	1	0
17	(Kazakhstan)	MF	Daniyar Usenov	2	0	1	0	0	0	0	0	3	0
18	(Kazakhstan)	FW	Vyacheslav Shvyryov	4	0	1	1	0	0	0	0	5	1
19	(Kazakhstan)	FW	Artur Shushenachev	0	0	1	0	0	0	0	0	1	0
21	(Kazakhstan)	MF	Arsen Buranchiev	2	1	1	0	0	0	0	0	3	1
22	(Kazakhstan)	MF	Yerkebulan Seydakhmet	5	0	1	0	1	0	0	0	7	0
23	(Kazakhstan)	MF	Andrey Ulshin	3	1	2	0	0	0	0	0	5	1
24	(Kazakhstan)	DF	Damir Kasabulat	2	0	0	0	0	0	0	0	2	0
25	(Kazakhstan)	DF	Aleksandr Shirobokov	0	0	2	0	0	0	0	0	2	0
26	(Kazakhstan)	MF	Adilet Sadybekov	4	1	0	0	0	0	1	0	5	1
28	(Kazakhstan)	MF	Rustam Emirov	1	0	0	0	0	0	0	0	1	0
30	(Russia)	GK	Vadim Ulyanov	0	0	0	1	0	0	0	0	0	1
Players away on loan:
Players who left Kairat during the season:
6	(Poland)	MF	Jacek Góralski	2	0	0	0	0	0	0	0	2	0
8	(Uzbekistan)	MF	Jasurbek Jaloliddinov	3	0	0	0	0	0	0	0	3	0
10	(Guinea)	FW	José Kanté	5	0	1	0	0	0	0	0	6	0
16	(Portugal)	MF	Ricardo Alves	0	1	0	0	0	0	0	0	0	1
			TOTALS	63	5	14	3	1	0	3	0	81	8
