= 2022 Kazakhstan Super Cup =

Tobol	Kairat
2	1
- Date: 2 March 2022
- Venue: Astana Arena, Nur-Sultan
- Referee: Daniyar Sakhi
- Attendance: 6,000

The 2022 Kazakhstan Super Cup was the 13th Kazakhstan Super Cup, an annual football match played between the winners of the previous season's Premier League, Tobol, and the winners of the previous season's Kazakhstan Cup, Kairat. The game was played on 2 March 2022 at the Astana Arena in Nur-Sultan, with Tobol beating Kairat 2–1 with Aybar Zhaksylykov scoring a 89th-minute winner. Serikzhan Muzhikov gave Tobol the lead in the 30th minute from the penalty spot, before João Paulo equalised for Kairat 10 minutes later.

== Match details ==
2 March 2022
19:30 UTC+06:00

Tobol	2 – 1	Kairat
Muzhikov 30' (pen.); Zhaksylykov 83'	Report	Paulo 39'

Astana Arena, Nur-Sultan
Attendance: 6,000
Referee: Daniyar Sakhi

Tobol	Kairat

GK	35	(Kazakhstan) Aleksandr Mokin
DF	22	(Kazakhstan) Aleksandr Marochkin
DF	24	(Kazakhstan) Bagdat Kairov
DF	25	(Kazakhstan) Serhiy Malyi
DF	33	(Montenegro) Žarko Tomašević
MF	10	(Kazakhstan) Serikzhan Muzhikov	(yellow card) 79'
MF	11	(Serbia) Zoran Tošić		(substituted off) 64'
MF	17	(Kazakhstan) Vladislav Vasilyev
MF	18	(Portugal) Rúben Brígido		(substituted off) 90'
MF	29	(Serbia) Dušan Jovančić	(yellow card) 60'
FW	77	(Uzbekistan) Igor Sergeyev		(substituted off) 81'
Substitutes:
GK	12	(Kazakhstan) Sultan Busurmanov
GK	23	(Kazakhstan) Dmytro Nepohodov
DF	3	(Kazakhstan) Roman Asrankulov
DF	5	(Kazakhstan) Daniyar Semchenkov
DF	7	(Kazakhstan) Dmitri Miroshnichenko
MF	8	(Kazakhstan) Askhat Tagybergen		(substituted on) 64'
MF	14	(Kazakhstan) Samat Zharynbetov		(substituted on) 90'
MF	20	(Kazakhstan) Zhaslan Zhumashev
FW	44	(Kazakhstan) Aybar Zhaksylykov		(substituted on) 81'
DF	45	(North Macedonia) Aleksa Amanović
MF	47	(Kazakhstan) Vyacheslav Kulpeisov
Manager:
(Kazakhstan) Alexander Moskalenko

GK	1	(Kazakhstan) Danil Ustimenko
DF	3	(Cameroon) Macky Bagnack
DF	4	(Russia) Viktor Vasin
DF	5	(Kazakhstan) Sergey Keiler
MF	6	(Poland) Jacek Góralski
MF	16	(Portugal) Ricardo Alves
MF	17	(Kazakhstan) Daniyar Usenov		(substituted off) 57'
MF	21	(Kazakhstan) Arsen Buranchiev
MF	22	(Kazakhstan) Yerkebulan Seydakhmet	(yellow card) 60'
FW	10	(Guinea) José Kanté		(substituted off) 57'
FW	11	(Brazil) João Paulo		(substituted off) 84'
Substitutes:
GK	30	(Russia) Vadim Ulyanov
DF	2	(Kazakhstan) Sultanbek Astanov
MF	7	(Kyrgyzstan) Gulzhigit Alykulov		(substituted on) 84'
MF	8	(Uzbekistan) Jasurbek Jaloliddinov
MF	14	(Kazakhstan) Adam Adakhadzhiev
FW	18	(Kazakhstan) Vyacheslav Shvyryov		(substituted on) 57'
FW	19	(Kazakhstan) Artur Shushenachev		(substituted on) 57'
MF	23	(Kazakhstan) Andrey Ulshin
DF	24	(Kazakhstan) Damir Kasabulat
Manager:
(Turkmenistan) Kurban Berdyev

== See also ==
- 2021 Kazakhstan Premier League
- 2021 Kazakhstan Cup
