= 2023 FC Kairat season =

FC Kairat
2023 season
- Chairman: Kairat Boranbayev
- Manager: Kirill Keker
- Stadium: Central Stadium
- Premier League: 4th
- Kazakhstan Cup: Quarterfinal vs Atyrau
- Top goalscorer: League: João Paulo (17); All: João Paulo (17)
- Highest home attendance: 21,845 vs Aktobe (14 May 2023)
- Lowest home attendance: 4,000 vs Akzhayik (19 April 2023)
- Average home league attendance: 9,705 (21 October 2023)
Home colours	Away colours	Third colours

The 2023 FC Kairat season was the 13th successive season that the club played in the Kazakhstan Premier League, the highest tier of association football in Kazakhstan, since their promotion back to the top flight in 2009.

== Season events ==
On 10 January, Artur Shushenachev extended his contract until the end of 2024.

On 17 January, Galymzhan Kenzhebek extended his contract until the end of 2024.

On 31 January, Macky Bagnack joined Pari NN on loan until the summer.

On 21 February, Kairat announced the loan signing of Ofri Arad from Maccabi Haifa for the season.

On 28 February, Kairat announced the signing of Dmitry Sergeyev from Zenit St.Petersburg to a two-year contract with the option of an additional year.

On 3 March, Daniyar Usenov extended his contract until the end of 2024.

On 15 March, Rustam Emirov was loaned to Khan Tengri for the season.

On 20 March, Daniyar Usenov was loaned to Caspiy for the season.

On 30 March, Kairat announced the signing of Mikael Askarov on a contract until the end of 2024, whilst also loaning him out to Ekibastuz for the season.

On 14 April, Aybar Abdulla left Kairat to join Shakhter Karagandy.

On 21 July, João Paulo extended his contract with Kairat until the end of 2024.

On 15 September, Vyacheslav Shvyryov extended his contract with Kairat until the end of 2024.

On 4 October, Arsen Buranchiev extended his contract with Kairat until the end of 2024.

== Squad ==
As of match played 29 October 2023

No.	Name	Nationality	Position	Date of birth (age)	Signed from	Signed in	Contract ends	Apps.	Goals
Goalkeepers
1	Danil Ustimenko	(Kazakhstan)	GK	8 August 2000 (aged 23)	Youth Team	2019	2024	65	0
27	Temirlan Anarbekov	(Kazakhstan)	GK	14 October 2003 (aged 20)	Youth Team	2020		5	0
30	Vadim Ulyanov	(Russia)	GK	7 October 2001 (aged 22)	Kairat Moscow	2022		20	0
Defenders
2	Egor Tkachenko	(Kazakhstan)	DF	14 April 2003 (aged 20)	Kairat Moscow	2022		29	0
3	Macky Bagnack	(Cameroon)	DF	7 June 1995 (aged 28)	Partizan	2021	2023	45	2
4	Damir Kasabulat	(Kazakhstan)	DF	29 August 2002 (aged 21)	Kairat Moscow	2022	2025	61	0
5	Viktor Vasin	(Russia)	DF	6 October 1988 (aged 35)	CSKA Moscow	2022	2023	57	4
6	Sergey Keiler	(Kazakhstan)	DF	11 August 1994 (aged 29)	Okzhetpes	2018		80	3
13	Lev Kurgin	(Kazakhstan)	DF	6 June 2002 (aged 21)	Kairat Moscow	2022		34	0
15	Ofri Arad	(Israel)	DF	11 September 1998 (aged 25)	on loan from Maccabi Haifa	2023	2023	27	0
24	Aleksandr Mrynskiy	(Kazakhstan)	DF	15 July 2004 (aged 19)	Academy	2022		7	0
25	Aleksandr Shirobokov	(Kazakhstan)	DF	2 January 2003 (aged 20)	Academy	2020		20	0
64	Vladislav Kravchenko	(Kazakhstan)	DF	15 April 2002 (aged 21)	Academy	2021		2	0
71	Ramazan Karimov	(Kazakhstan)	DF	24 November 2004 (aged 18)	Academy	2023		1	0
Midfielders
8	Anton Krachkovsky	(Russia)	MF	22 June 2002 (aged 21)	CSKA Moscow	2022		55	1
19	Galymzhan Kenzhebek	(Kazakhstan)	MF	12 February 2003 (aged 20)	Academy	2020	2024	12	0
20	Dmitry Sergeyev	(Russia)	MF	3 April 2000 (aged 23)	Zenit St.Petersburg	2023		28	5
21	Arsen Buranchiev	(Kazakhstan)	MF	12 September 2001 (aged 22)	Academy	2020	2024	56	1
22	Yerkebulan Seydakhmet	(Kazakhstan)	MF	4 February 2000 (aged 23)	Ufa	2019		80	4
23	Andrey Ulshin	(Kazakhstan)	MF	18 April 2000 (aged 23)	Academy	2020		61	5
26	Adilet Sadybekov	(Kazakhstan)	MF	26 May 2002 (aged 21)	Academy	2021	2025	50	3
39	Dias Kushkumbaev	(Kazakhstan)	MF	30 April 2003 (aged 20)	Academy	2021		2	0
82	Alibi Mukhit	(Kazakhstan)	MF	18 April 2004 (aged 19)	Academy	2023		1	0
84	Nazar Al-Khadzh	(Kazakhstan)	MF	15 July 2004 (aged 19)	Academy	2021		1	0
85	Miras Omatay	(Kazakhstan)	MF	15 July 2004 (aged 19)	Academy	2021		2	0
Forwards
10	Artur Shushenachev	(Kazakhstan)	FW	7 April 1998 (aged 25)	Academy	2017	2024	128	45
11	João Paulo	(Brazil)	FW	2 June 1988 (aged 35)	Ordabasy	2021	2024	75	32
17	Bayzhan Madelkhan	(Kazakhstan)	FW	28 June 2002 (aged 21)	Academy	2022		3	0
18	Vyacheslav Shvyryov	(Kazakhstan)	FW	7 January 2001 (aged 22)	Academy	2018	2024	87	10
73	Nurgeldy Toleukhanov	(Kazakhstan)	FW	8 November 2003 (aged 19)	Academy	2022		1	0
83	Yan Trufanov	(Kazakhstan)	FW	17 May 2004 (aged 19)	Academy	2022		13	4
91	Saif Popov	(Kazakhstan)	FW	30 June 2004 (aged 19)	Academy	2021		6	0
Players away on loan
17	Daniyar Usenov	(Kazakhstan)	MF	18 February 2001 (aged 22)	Academy	2020	2024	64	4
28	Rustam Emirov	(Kazakhstan)	MF	14 September 2000 (aged 23)	Kairat Moscow	2022		5	0
Players that left during the season
2	Sultanbek Astanov	(Kazakhstan)	MF	23 March 1999 (aged 24)	Academy	2019		62	3
7	Gulzhigit Alykulov	(Kyrgyzstan)	MF	25 November 2000 (aged 22)	Neman Grodno	2020		100	13
14	Adam Adakhadzhiev	(Kazakhstan)	MF	23 November 1998 (aged 24)	Academy	2019	2023	21	0
16	Miras Kobeev	(Kazakhstan)	MF	9 June 2004 (aged 19)	Academy	2022		3	0
29	Aybar Abdulla	(Kazakhstan)	FW	22 January 2002 (aged 21)	Kairat Moscow	2022		10	0

== Transfers ==
=== In ===
Date	Position	Nationality	Name	From	Fee	Ref.
28 February 2023	MF	(Russia)	Dmitry Sergeyev	Zenit St.Petersburg	Undisclosed	

=== Loans in ===
Date from	Position	Nationality	Name	To	Date to	Ref.
21 February 2023	DF	(Israel)	Ofri Arad	Maccabi Haifa	End of season	

=== Out ===
Date	Position	Nationality	Name	To	Fee	Ref.
14 December 2022	DF	(Kazakhstan)	Nuraly Alip	Zenit St.Petersburg	Undisclosed	
16 March 2023	MF	(Kazakhstan)	Sultanbek Astanov	Ordabasy	Undisclosed	
16 March 2023	MF	(Kazakhstan)	Adam Adakhadzhiev	Khan Tengri	Undisclosed	

=== Loans out ===
Date from	Position	Nationality	Name	To	Date to	Ref.
1 July 2022	FW	(Kazakhstan)	Bayzhan Madelkhan	Murom	28 June 2023	
15 March 2023	DF	(Kazakhstan)	Rustam Emirov	Khan Tengri	31 December 2023	
20 March 2023	MF	(Kazakhstan)	Daniyar Usenov	Caspiy	31 December 2023	
31 January 2023	DF	(Cameroon)	Macky Bagnack	Pari NN	30 June 2023	
20 February 2023	MF	(Kazakhstan)	Alen Aymanov	Yelimay	31 December 2023	

=== Released ===
Date	Position	Nationality	Name	Joined	Date	Ref.
11 May 2023	MF	(Kyrgyzstan)	Gulzhigit Alykulov	Neman Grodno	4 August 2023	
29 August 2023	MF	(Kazakhstan)	Miras Kobeev	Isloch Minsk Raion	29 January 2024	
1 December 2023	DF	(Cameroon)	Macky Bagnack	TSC	4 April 2024	
1 December 2023	DF	(Kazakhstan)	Sergey Keiler	Yelimay		

== Friendlies ==
25 February 2023	Pakhtakor Tashkent	4 – 3	Kairat	Turkey
17:00 UZT (UTC+5)	Ćeran 4', 45'; Rashidov 58'; Alijonov 62'	Report	Alykulov 20'; João Paulo 50', 73'	Referee: I.Tantashev

14 October 2023	Kairat	2 – 2	Zenit St.Petersburg	Almaty
17:00 UZT (UTC+5)	João Paulo 8' (yellow card) 77'; Shvyryov (yellow card) 38'; Arad 69'; Krachkovsky (yellow card) 81'	Report	Yerokhin 29'; (yellow card) 81'; Mantuan 85'	Stadium: Central Stadium

== Competitions ==
=== Overview ===
Competition	First match	Last match	Starting round	Final position	Record							
Competition	First match	Last match	Starting round	Final position	Pld	W	D	L	GF	GA	GD	Win %
Premier League	4 March 2023	29 October 2023	Matchday 1	4th	26	12	8	6	44	32	+12	46.15
Kazakhstan Cup	19 April 2023	7 June 2023	Last 16	Quarterfinal	4	1	2	1	4	4	+0	25.00
Total					30	13	10	7	48	36	+12	43.33

Last updated: 29 October 2023
Source: Competitions

=== Premier League ===
==== Results summary ====
Overall								Home						Away					
Pld	W	D	L	GF	GA	GD	Pts	W	D	L	GF	GA	GD	W	D	L	GF	GA	GD
26	12	8	6	44	32	+12	44	7	4	2	26	16	+10	5	4	4	18	16	+2

Last updated: 29 October 2023.
Source: See Results

==== Results by round ====
Round	1	2	3	4	5	6	7	8	9	10	11	12	13	14	15	16	17	18	19	20	21	22	23	24	25	26
Ground	H	A	H	A	H	A	H	A	H	H	A	H	H	A	A	H	A	A	H	A	H	A	H	A	H	A
Result	D	W	W	D	L	W	W	W	W	L	L	W	W	L	W	D	D	L	W	L	W	W	D	D	W	D
Position	8	6	5	6	7	5	5	5	4	5	5	5	4	5	4	4	4	4	4	5	5	4	4	4	4	4

Source: See Results
A = Away; H = Home; W = Win; D = Draw; L = Loss

==== League table ====
Pos	Team	Pld	W	D	L	GF	GA	GD	Pts	Qualification or relegation
2	Astana	26	16	5	5	36	24	+12	53	Qualification for the Conference League second qualifying round
3	Aktobe	26	13	11	2	44	23	+21	50	Qualification for the Conference League first qualifying round
4	Kairat	26	12	8	6	44	32	+12	44	
5	Kyzylzhar	26	11	6	9	25	23	+2	39	
6	Kaisar	26	10	6	10	31	30	+1	36	

Source: UEFA, Soccerway
Rules for classification: 1) Points; 2) Goal difference; 3) Matches won; 4) Goals scored; 5) Away goals scored; 6) Head-to-head points; 7) Head-to-head matches won; 8) Head-to-head goal difference; 9) Head-to-head goals scored; 10) Head-to-head away goals scored; 11) Draw.

==== Results ====
5 March 2023 1	Kairat	2–2	Atyrau	Almaty
17:00 (UTC+6)	Shushenachev 17' (yellow card) 56'; Alykulov 23'; Sadybekov (yellow card) 58'	Report	Zhumakhanov (yellow card) 30'; Imeri 37'; Kozlov 65' (yellow card) 67'	Stadium: Central Stadium; Attendance: 6,000; Referee: Artem Kuchin

9 March 2023 2	Aksu	1–3	Kairat	Pavlodar
18:00 (UTC+6)	Zhaksybaev (yellow card) 4'; Obilor (yellow card) 45+3'; Turlybek 81'	Report	Shvyryov (yellow card) 13'; Keiler (yellow card) 14'; Shushenachev 39'; João Paulo 75'; Seydakhmet 87'; Sadybekov (yellow card) 90'; Ustimenko (yellow card) 90+4'	Stadium: Central Stadium; Attendance: 3,000; Referee: Sayat Karabaev

14 March 2023 3	Kairat	3–1	Caspiy	Almaty
19:00 (UTC+6)	Arad (yellow card) 6'; Vasin (yellow card) 18'; Shvyryov 21'; Shushenachev 44'; João Paulo 70' (pen.)	Report	Narzildayev (yellow card) 32'; Kadyrbaev (yellow card) 32'; Kusyapov 45+4'	Stadium: Central Stadium; Attendance: 5,200; Referee: Bulat Sariev

1 April 2023 4	Shakhter Karagandy	1–1	Kairat	Karaganda
16:00 (UTC+6)	Pertsukh (yellow card) 14'; Savkiv (yellow card) 62'; Cañas 75'; Murtazayev (yellow card) 82'	Report	Mina 86' (o.g.); Sergeyev (yellow card) 90+3'	Stadium: Shakhter Stadium; Attendance: 2,000; Referee: Bagdat Abdullaev

9 April 2023 5	Kairat	2–3	Zhetysu	Almaty
17:00 (UTC+6)	Vasin 37' (yellow card) 78'; Sadybekov (yellow card) 41'; João Paulo (yellow card) 42'; Shvyryov (yellow card) 68'; Ulshin 74'	Report	Ardazishvili (yellow card) 14' (goal) 54'; Kadio (yellow card) 39'; Amirseitov (yellow card) 45'; Hasein 80'; Teverov 90'	Stadium: Central Stadium; Attendance: 5,920; Referee: Denis Tevyashov

16 April 2023 6	Astana	0–3	Kairat	Astana
19:00 (UTC+6)	Darabayev (yellow card) 53'	Report	João Paulo 3', 56'; Sergeyev 86'; Seydakhmet (yellow card) 88'	Stadium: Astana Arena; Attendance: 10,200; Referee: Daniyar Sakhi

23 April 2023 7	Kairat	2–2	Ordabasy	Almaty
18:00 (UTC+6)	Shvyryov (yellow card) 34'; João Paulo 36', 76'; Kurgin (yellow card) 56'; Kenzhebek (yellow card) 82'	Report	Suyumbayev 58'; Yerlanov (yellow card) 63'; Tagybergen 68' (pen.)	Stadium: Central Stadium; Attendance: 15,200; Referee: Grigory Moskovchenko

6 May 2023 8	Tobol	2–3	Kairat	Kostanay
17:00 (UTC+6)	Zhumashev 10'; Asrankulov (yellow card) 45+2'; Zharynbetov (yellow card) 51'; Chesnokov 90'; Vukadinović (yellow card) 90+6'	Report	Kurgin (yellow card) 41'; Shushenachev 54'; João Paulo 73'; Arad (yellow card) 90+1'; Sergeyev 90+5'	Stadium: Central Stadium; Attendance: 2,500; Referee: Artem Kuchin

14 May 2023 9	Kairat	2–1	Aktobe	Almaty
17:00 (UTC+6)	Shvyryov (yellow card) 27'; Seydakhmet (yellow card) 33'; João Paulo 62'; Shushenachev 81'	Report	Santana 51'	Stadium: Central Stadium; Attendance: 21,845; Referee: Daniyar Sakhi

21 May 2023 10	Kairat	0–3	Kaisar	Almaty
18:00 (UTC+6)	João Paulo (yellow card) 59'	Report	Pedro 10'; Baradzin 24' (pen.), 45+3' (pen.); Kenesbek (yellow card) 59'; Sicaci (yellow card) 90'	Stadium: Central Stadium; Attendance: 6,758; Referee: Ruslan Sultangaliev

27 May 2023 11	Maktaaral	3–1	Kairat	Shymkent
18:00 (UTC+6)	Karimov 7', 13'; Aripov (yellow card) 56'; Braga 78'	Report	Keiler (yellow card) 45'; João Paulo 63'	Stadium: Namys Stadion; Attendance: 2,700; Referee: Alexander Gauzer

3 June 2023 12	Kairat	2–1	Okzhetpes	Almaty
19:00 (UTC+6)	João Paulo 8' (pen.), 49'; Shushenachev (yellow card) 20'; Keiler (yellow card) 90+4'	Report	Ryzhuk (yellow card) 24'; Tolebek (yellow card) 75'; Bolov 79' (pen.)	Stadium: Central Stadium; Attendance: 5,467; Referee: Artem Kuchin

24 June 2023 14	Kairat	3–0	Kyzylzhar	Almaty
18 (UTC+6)	João Paulo 41' (pen.), 66'; Arad (yellow card) 84'; Kurgin (yellow card) 86'; Trufanov 90+4'	Report	Shadmanov (yellow card) 39'; Shakhmetov (yellow card) 41'; Chikanchi (yellow card) 77'	Stadium: Central Stadium; Attendance: 4,546; Referee: Sayat Karabaev

2 July 2023 13	Kyzylzhar	2–1	Kairat	Petropavl
17:00 (UTC+6)	Chikanchi 7'; Beryozkin 17'; Tapalov (yellow card) 73'; Podio (yellow card) 80'; Bushman (yellow card) 88'	Report	Kasabulat (yellow card) 28'; Sadybekov 62'; Seydakhmet (yellow card) 90+1'; Ulshin (yellow card) 90+5'	Stadium: Karasai Stadium; Attendance: 2,000; Referee: Bulat Sariev

15 July 2023 15	Okzhetpes	0–1	Kairat	Astana
17:00 (UTC+6)	Dimitrov (yellow card) 8'; Tatayev (yellow card) 50'	Report	Bagnack (yellow card) 26'; Trufanov 45'; Kurgin (yellow card) 70'	Stadium: Astana Arena; Attendance: 400; Referee: Daniyar Sakhi

23 July 2023 16	Kairat	2–2	Maktaaral	Almaty
19:00 (UTC+6)	Shvyryov (yellow card) 1'; Seydakhmet 13' (yellow card) 19'; João Paulo 41'; Sadybekov (yellow card) 79'	Report	Zhangylyshbay 37'; Karimov 45+3'; Tursynbay (yellow card) 52'; Kalmykov (yellow card) 90+4'	Stadium: Central Stadium; Attendance: 4,350; Referee: Bagdat Abdullaev

29 July 2023 17	Kaisar	0–0	Kairat	Kyzylorda
21:00 (UTC+6)	Ekra (yellow card) 2'; Makhan (yellow card) 63'	Report	Shirobokov (yellow card) 65'	Stadium: Gani Muratbayev Stadium; Attendance: 6,000; Referee: Sergey Nozhenko

6 August 2023 18	Aktobe	4–2	Kairat	Aktobe
21:00 (UTC+6)	China 20'; Filipović (yellow card) 28'; Santana 35'; Kasym 53'; Shomko 57' (yellow card) 65'; Tanzharikov (yellow card) 65'; Strumia (yellow card) 65'	Report	Krachkovsky (yellow card) 17'; Sergeyev 29'; Shushenachev 45+1'; Seydakhmet (yellow card) 63'; Ustimenko (yellow card) 65'	Stadium: Central Stadium; Attendance: 12,354; Referee: Denis Tevyashov

13 August 2023 19	Kairat	3–0	Tobol	Almaty
19:00 (UTC+6)	Shushenachev 5'; Shirobokov (yellow card) 19'; Tkachenko (yellow card) 28'; Shvyryov 42' (yellow card) 66'	Report	Ilić 12'; Gabarayev (yellow card) 33'; Konovalov (yellow card) 66'; Muzhikov (yellow card) 90+4'	Stadium: Central Stadium; Attendance: 11,345; Referee: Saken Bayimbet
Note: Matched awarded as a 3-0 victory to Kairat on 24 August after Tobol fielded Igor Ivanović who'd already played in a Round 19 for Astana earlier in the season.

20 August 2023 20	Ordabasy	1–0	Kairat	Shymkent
21:00 (UTC+6)	Umarov (yellow card) 65'; Byesyedin (yellow card) 89'; Matić 90+7'	Report	Kasabulat (yellow card) 6'; Shvyryov (yellow card) 36'; Ustimenko (yellow card) 45+4'; Sadybekov (yellow card) 60'; Bagnack (yellow card) 90+7'	Stadium: Kazhymukan Munaitpasov Stadium; Attendance: 18,063; Referee: Sayat Karabaev

27 August 2023 21	Kairat	1–0	Astana	Almaty
19:00 (UTC+6)	Bagnack (yellow card) 39' (goal) 87'	Report	Zhaksylykov (yellow card) 41'; Jovančić (yellow card) 76'; Basmanov (yellow card) 85'	Stadium: Central Stadium; Attendance: 20,356; Referee: Daniyar Sakhi

16 September 2023 22	Zhetysu	1–2	Kairat	Taldykorgan
16:00 (UTC+6)	Nurball 11'; Atikhanov (yellow card) 49'; Adams (yellow card) 85'	Report	João Paulo 33', 62'; Shushenachev (yellow card) 37'; Kasabulat (yellow card) 72'; Bagnack (yellow card) 72' (yellow-red card) 90+3'; Tkachenko (yellow card) 90+5'	Stadium: Zhetysu Stadium; Attendance: 2,100; Referee: Aydyn Tasybaev

23 September 2023 23	Kairat	0–0	Shakhter Karagandy	Almaty
19:00 (UTC+6)		Report	Ćosić (yellow card) 90'	Stadium: Central Stadium; Attendance: 14,678; Referee: Aleksandr Gauser

1 October 2023 24	Caspiy	1–1	Kairat	Aktau
17:00 (UTC+6)	Taipi 30'; Chernomyrdin (yellow card) 33'; Avric (yellow card) 80'; Kocev (yellow card) 86'	Report	Kasabulat (yellow card) 71'; Shvyryov 74'	Stadium: Zhastar Stadium; Attendance: 3,000; Referee: Danil Gorda

21 October 2023 25	Kairat	4–1	Aksu	Almaty
16:00 (UTC+6)	João Paulo 9'; Vasin (yellow card) 29'; Shushenachev 41'; Sadybekov (yellow card) 66'; Sergeyev 74'; Trufanov 90'	Report	Eskić (yellow card) 12'; Marat (yellow card) 48'; Agimanov (yellow card) 80'; Lima (yellow card) 83'; Zhaksybaev (yellow card) 89'; Abil 90+5'	Stadium: Central Stadium; Attendance: 4,500; Referee: Denis Izmaylov

29 October 2023 26	Atyrau	0–0	Kairat	Atyrau
15:00 (UTC+6)	Noyok (penalty missed) 41'; Najaryan (yellow card) 47'	Report	Shushenachev (yellow card) 41'; Sergeyev (yellow card) 45'; Kurgin (yellow card) 75'	Stadium: Munaishy Stadium; Attendance: 0 Referee: Artem Kuchin
Note: Match played behind closed doors due to the Kostenko mine disaster.

=== Kazakhstan Cup ===
19 April 2023 Round of 16 1st leg	Kairat	2–1	Akzhayik	Almaty
19:00 (UTC+6)	Buranchiev (yellow card) 55'; Sergeyev 66'; Shushenachev 68'; Shirobokov (yellow card) 89'; Ustimenko (yellow card) 90+4' (red card) 90+4'	Report	Kobzar 56'	Stadium: Central Stadium; Attendance: 4,000; Referee: Arman Ismuratov

30 April 2023 Round of 16 2nd leg	Akzhayik	0–0 (1–2 agg.)	Kairat	Oral
18:00 (UTC+6)	Konlimkos (yellow card) 55'	Report	Arad (yellow card) 62'; Sergeyev (yellow card) 73'	Stadium: Petr Atoyan Stadium; Attendance: 2,500; Referee: Saken Bayimbet

17 May 2023 Quarterfinal 1st leg	Kairat	1–1	Atyrau	Almaty
19:00 (UTC+6)	Shvyryov 12'; Keiler (yellow card) 21'; Seydakhmet (yellow card) 52'; Kenzhebek (yellow card) 85'	Report	Antanavičius (yellow card) 24'; Stepanov (yellow card) 26'; Karavaev (yellow card) 29'; Takulov (yellow card) 45+5'; Shushenachev 70' (o.g.); Noyok (yellow card) 85'	Stadium: Central Stadium; Attendance: 5,326; Referee: Viktor Antonov

7 June 2023 Quarterfinal 2nd leg	Atyrau	2–1 (3–2 agg.)	Kairat	Atyrau
19:00 (UTC+6)	Nsungusi 16', 51'; Imeri (yellow card) 56'; Kerimzhanov (yellow card) 88'	Report	Seydakhmet (yellow card) 22'; Trufanov 67'; Kasabulat (yellow card) 78'; Kurgin (yellow card) 87'; João Paulo (yellow card) 90+3'	Stadium: Munaishy Stadium; Attendance: 6,000; Referee: Alexander Zatula

== Squad statistics ==
As of match played 29 October 2023

=== Appearances and goals ===
No.	Pos	Nat	Player	Total		Premier League		Kazakhstan Cup	
No.	Pos	Nat	Player	Apps	Goals	Apps	Goals	Apps	Goals
1	GK	(Kazakhstan) KAZ	Danil Ustimenko	20	0	20	0	0	0
2	DF	(Kazakhstan) KAZ	Egor Tkachenko	21	0	9+9	0	3	0
3	DF	(Cameroon) CMR	Macky Bagnack	11	1	10+1	1	0	0
4	DF	(Kazakhstan) KAZ	Damir Kasabulat	29	0	23+2	0	3+1	0
5	DF	(Russia) RUS	Viktor Vasin	25	1	23	1	2	0
6	DF	(Kazakhstan) KAZ	Sergey Keiler	13	0	8+1	0	2+2	0
8	MF	(Russia) RUS	Anton Krachkovsky	27	0	19+5	0	1+2	0
10	FW	(Kazakhstan) KAZ	Artur Shushenachev	29	8	22+3	7	4	1
11	FW	(Brazil) BRA	João Paulo	28	17	26	17	2	0
13	DF	(Kazakhstan) KAZ	Lev Kurgin	24	0	17+4	0	2+1	0
15	DF	(Israel) ISR	Ofri Arad	27	0	23+1	0	3	0
16	MF	(Kazakhstan) KAZ	Miras Kobeev	1	0	0	0	1	0
17	FW	(Kazakhstan) KAZ	Bayzhan Madelkhan	3	0	0+3	0	0	0
18	FW	(Kazakhstan) KAZ	Vyacheslav Shvyryov	27	3	21+3	2	2+1	1
19	MF	(Kazakhstan) KAZ	Galymzhan Kenzhebek	9	0	0+7	0	0+2	0
20	MF	(Russia) RUS	Dmitry Sergeyev	28	5	11+13	4	3+1	1
21	MF	(Kazakhstan) KAZ	Arsen Buranchiev	8	0	2+4	0	2	0
22	MF	(Kazakhstan) KAZ	Yerkebulan Seydakhmet	25	2	15+6	2	3+1	0
23	MF	(Kazakhstan) KAZ	Andrey Ulshin	18	1	5+9	1	1+3	0
24	DF	(Kazakhstan) KAZ	Alexander Mrynsky	4	0	0+2	0	0+2	0
25	DF	(Kazakhstan) KAZ	Aleksandr Shirobokov	8	0	3+2	0	2+1	0
26	MF	(Kazakhstan) KAZ	Adilet Sadybekov	28	1	20+5	1	3	0
30	GK	(Russia) RUS	Vadim Ulyanov	12	0	6+2	0	4	0
39	MF	(Kazakhstan) KAZ	Dias Kushkumbaev	2	0	0+2	0	0	0
71	DF	(Kazakhstan) KAZ	Ramazan Karimov	1	0	0+1	0	0	0
82	MF	(Kazakhstan) KAZ	Alibi Mukhit	1	0	0+1	0	0	0
83	FW	(Kazakhstan) KAZ	Yan Trufanov	12	4	1+10	3	0+1	1
91	FW	(Kazakhstan) KAZ	Saif Popov	6	0	0+6	0	0	0
Players away from Kairat on loan:
Players who left Kairat during the season:
7	MF	(Kyrgyzstan) KGZ	Gulzhigit Alykulov	8	1	2+4	1	1+1	0
29	FW	(Kazakhstan) KAZ	Aybar Abdulla	2	0	0+2	0	0	0

=== Goal scorers ===
Place	Position	Nation	Number	Name	Premier League	Kazakhstan Cup	Total
1	FW	(Brazil)	11	João Paulo	17	0	17
2	FW	(Kazakhstan)	10	Artur Shushenachev	7	1	8
3	MF	(Russia)	20	Dmitry Sergeyev	4	1	5
4	FW	(Kazakhstan)	83	Yan Trufanov	3	1	4
5	FW	(Kazakhstan)	18	Vyacheslav Shvyryov	2	1	3
6	MF	(Kazakhstan)	22	Yerkebulan Seydakhmet	2	0	2
7	MF	(Kyrgyzstan)	7	Gulzhigit Alykulov	1	0	1
7	DF	(Russia)	5	Viktor Vasin	1	0	1
7	MF	(Kazakhstan)	23	Andrey Ulshin	1	0	1
7	MF	(Kazakhstan)	26	Adilet Sadybekov	1	0	1
7	DF	(Cameroon)	3	Macky Bagnack	1	0	1
7				Own goal	1	0	1
				Awarded	3	0	3
				TOTALS	44	4	48

=== Clean sheets ===
Place	Position	Nation	Number	Name	Premier League	Kazakhstan Cup	Total
1	GK	(Kazakhstan)	1	Danil Ustimenko	5	0	5
2	GK	(Russia)	30	Vadim Ulyanov	3	1	4
				TOTALS	8	1	9

=== Disciplinary record ===
Number	Nation	Position	Name	Premier League		Kazakhstan Cup		Total	
Number	Nation	Position	Name	Booked	Sent off (straight red)	Booked	Sent off (straight red)	Booked	Sent off (straight red)
1	(Kazakhstan)	GK	Danil Ustimenko	3	0	1	1	4	1
2	(Kazakhstan)	DF	Egor Tkachenko	2	0	0	0	2	0
3	(Cameroon)	DF	Macky Bagnack	5	1	0	0	5	1
4	(Kazakhstan)	DF	Damir Kasabulat	4	0	1	0	5	0
5	(Russia)	DF	Viktor Vasin	3	0	0	0	3	0
6	(Kazakhstan)	DF	Sergey Keiler	3	0	1	0	4	0
8	(Russia)	MF	Anton Krachkovsky	1	0	0	0	1	0
10	(Kazakhstan)	FW	Artur Shushenachev	4	0	0	0	4	0
11	(Brazil)	FW	João Paulo	2	0	1	0	3	0
13	(Kazakhstan)	DF	Lev Kurgin	5	0	1	0	6	0
15	(Israel)	DF	Ofri Arad	3	0	1	0	4	0
18	(Kazakhstan)	FW	Vyacheslav Shvyryov	7	0	0	0	7	0
19	(Kazakhstan)	MF	Galymzhan Kenzhebek	1	0	1	0	2	0
20	(Russia)	MF	Dmitry Sergeyev	2	0	1	0	3	0
21	(Kazakhstan)	MF	Arsen Buranchiev	0	0	1	0	1	0
22	(Kazakhstan)	MF	Yerkebulan Seydakhmet	5	0	2	0	7	0
23	(Kazakhstan)	MF	Andrey Ulshin	1	0	0	0	1	0
25	(Kazakhstan)	DF	Aleksandr Shirobokov	2	0	1	0	3	0
26	(Kazakhstan)	MF	Adilet Sadybekov	6	0	0	0	6	0
Players away on loan:
Players who left Kairat during the season:
			TOTALS	59	1	12	1	71	2
