= Anton Krachkovsky =

Russian footballer

Personal information
- Full name: Anton Romanovich Krachkovsky
- Date of birth: 22 June 2002 (age 24)
- Height: 1.67 m (5 ft 6 in)
- Position: Central midfielder

Team information
- Current team: Mashuk-KMV Pyatigorsk
- Number: 5

Youth career
- –2021: CSKA Moscow

Senior career*
Years	Team	Apps	(Gls)
2022	CSKA Moscow	0	(0)
2022	→ Kairat Moscow (loan)	19	(1)
2022–2024	Kairat	45	(1)
2024–2026	Dynamo Makhachkala	18	(0)
2024–2026	Dynamo-2 Makhachkala	1	(0)
2025	→ Turan Tovuz (loan)	6	(0)
2025–2026	→ Chernomorets Novorossiysk (loan)	15	(1)
2026–	Mashuk-KMV Pyatigorsk	9	(0)
- * Club domestic league appearances and goals as of 15 November 2026

Anton Romanovich Krachkovsky (Russian: Антон Романович Крачковский; born 22 June 2002) is a Russian football player who plays as a central midfielder for Mashuk-KMV Pyatigorsk.

== Career ==
Krachkovsky made his Russian Premier League debut for Dynamo Makhachkala on 21 July 2024 in a game against Khimki, that was Dynamo's first ever game in the Premier League. In the first half, Krachkovsky fouled Reziuan Mirzov twice, leading to two penalty kicks. Khimki players hit the cross-bar and the post with their kicks. The game ended in a 1–1 draw.

On 6 January 2025, Krachkovsky moved on loan to Turan Tovuz in Azerbaijan until the end of the 2024–25 season.

== Career statistics ==
As of match played 16 May 2026

Appearances and goals by club, season and competition
Club	Season	League			Cup		Europe		Total	
Club	Season	Division	Apps	Goals	Apps	Goals	Apps	Goals	Apps	Goals
Kairat Moscow (loan)	2021–22	Russian Second League	19	1	5	0	—		24	1
Kairat	2022	Kazakhstan Premier League	21	1	5	0	2 (Note: Appearances in UEFA Conference League)	0	28	1
Kairat	2023	Kazakhstan Premier League	24	0	3	0	—		27	0
Kairat	Total		45	1	8	0	2	0	55	1
Dynamo Makhachkala	2023–24	Russian First League	14	0	0	0	—		14	0
Dynamo Makhachkala	2024–25	Russian Premier League	4	0	3	0	—		7	0
Dynamo Makhachkala	Total		18	0	3	0	0	0	21	0
Dynamo-2 Makhachkala	2024	Russian Second League B	1	0	—		—		1	0
Turan Tovuz (loan)	2024–25	Azerbaijan Premier League	6	0	—		—		6	0
Chernomorets Novorossiysk (loan)	2025–26	Russian First League	15	1	1	0	—		16	1
Career total			104	3	17	0	2	0	123	3
