= Lague Byiringiro =

Rwandan footballer

Personal information
- Date of birth: 25 October 2000 (age 26)
- Place of birth: Gitega, Nyarugenge District, Rwanda
- Height: 1.77 m (5 ft 10 in)
- Position: Forward

Team information
- Current team: Police FC

Youth career
- Isonga

Senior career*
Years	Team	Apps	(Gls)
2018–2023	APR		
2023–2024	Sandviken	37	(9)
2025–	Police FC		

International career^{‡}
- Rwanda U20
2018	Rwanda U23	1	(0)
2021–	Rwanda	12	(1)
- * Club domestic league appearances and goals as of 14 November 2024 ‡ National team caps and goals as of 1 July 2024

Lague Byiringiro (born 25 October 2000) is a Rwandan professional footballer who plays as a forward for Police FC and the Rwanda national team.

== Club career ==
Byiringiro was promoted to the APR first team in the Rwanda Premier League (RPL) in January 2018, and played in the Heroes Cup later that month. He was nominated for Young Player of the Year at the 2018 RPL Awards after APR won its 17th title. They also won the Super Cup that offseason. Byiringiro was sidelined in March 2019 after he suffered a torn hamstring during a league fixture versus Sunrise FC. In May 2020 he was signed to a two-year contract extension. The 2019–20 Premier League season was abandoned due to the COVID-19 pandemic in Rwanda, and APR were awarded the league title by the Rwanda Football Federation.

He attended trials with Swiss club FC Zürich in April 2021.

In February 2022, Byiringiro was signed to a four-year extension by APR after months of negotiations, since his contract was due to expire at the conclusion of the season. By this time, he had established himself as one of the best forwards in the country.

In January 2023, Swedish club Sandviken announced the signing of Byiringiro.

In January 2025, Byiringiro returned to Rwanda, signing with Police FC.

== International career ==
=== Youth ===
Byiringiro represented the national under-20 team during 2019 Africa U-20 Cup of Nations qualification, scoring against Kenya in the first round. A few months later he played one game with the Rwanda U23s during 2019 Africa U-23 Cup of Nations qualification.

=== Senior ===
Byiringiro was first called up to the senior national team in March 2019 ahead of a Africa Cup of Nations qualifier against Ivory Coast, sitting on the bench during the 3–0 defeat. He was then called up by manager Vincent Mashami in October for a friendly against Tanzania, and again failed to make an appearance. In November 2020, he was named to the provisional squad ahead of a doubleheader of 2021 Africa Cup of Nations qualifiers against Cape Verde, but was left off the roster during final cuts.

Byiringiro made his senior international debut on 26 January 2021, replacing an injured Bertrand Iradukunda in the starting lineup of Rwanda's 3–2 group stage victory over Togo in the 2020 African Nations Championship. He played an instrumental role in the win that qualified them to the knockout stage, drawing praise for his ability to create chances through his dribbling, pace and vision. He also started in their quarter-final defeat to Guinea. Byiringiro scored his first international goal in his third match, an Africa Cup of Nations qualifier against Mozambique on 24 March 2021. After coming on for Thierry Manzi as a halftime substitute, he sent a right-footed shot from outside the penalty area past Mozambique goalkeeper Júlio Franque to secure the 1–0 victory.

== Career statistics ==
=== International ===
As of 25 March 2021

Rwanda
Year	Apps	Goals
2021	3	1
Total	3	1

=== International goals ===
Scores and results list Rwanda's goal tally first.

Goal	Date	Venue	Opponent	Score	Result	Competition
1.	24 March 2021	Nyamirambo Regional Stadium, Kigali, Rwanda	Mozambique	1–0	1–0	2021 Africa Cup of Nations qualification

== Honours ==
=== Club ===
APR

- Rwanda Premier League: 2017–18, 2019–20
- Super Cup: 2018
- Heroes Cup: 2019
