= Adilet Sadybekov =

Kazakhstani footballer (born 2002)

Personal information
- Full name: Adilet Nurkenuly Sadybekov
- Date of birth: 26 May 2002 (age 24)
- Place of birth: Aktobe, Kazakhstan
- Height: 1.84 m (6 ft 0 in)
- Position: Midfielder

Team information
- Current team: Kairat
- Number: 6

Youth career
- –2021: Kairat-Zhastar

Senior career*
| Years | Team | Apps | (Gls) |
| 2021– | Kairat | 75 | (4) |
| 2022 | → Kairat Moscow (loan) | 11 | (1) |

International career^{‡}
| 2022–2023 | Kazakhstan U21 | 5 | (0) |
| 2022– | Kazakhstan | 5 | (1) |
- * Club domestic league appearances and goals as of 1 November 2026 ‡ National team caps and goals as of 11 June 2024

Adilet Nurkenuly Sadybekov (Kazakh: Әділет Нұркенұлы Садыбеков, romanized: Ädılet Nūrkenūly Sadybekov; born 26 May 2002) is a Kazakh footballer who plays as a midfielder for Kairat and the Kazakhstan national team.

== Club career ==
On 14 June 2022, Kairat announced the signing of Sadybekov on a contract until the end of 2024.

== Career statistics ==
=== Club ===
As of match played 17 September 2026

Appearances and goals by club, season and competition
| Club | Season | League | | | National Cup | | Continental | | Other | | Total | |
| Club | Season | Division | Apps | Goals | Apps | Goals | Apps | Goals | Apps | Goals | Apps | Goals |
|---|---|---|---|---|---|---|---|---|---|---|---|---|
| Kairat | 2021 | Kazakhstan Premier League | 0 | 0 | 3 | 0 | 0 (Note: Zero appearances in the UEFA Champions League, UEFA Europa League or UEFA Europa Conference League) | 0 | 0 (Note: Appearances in the Kazakhstan Super Cup) | 0 | 3 | 0 |
| Kairat | 2022 | Kazakhstan Premier League | 11 | 0 | 6 | 2 | 2 (Note: Appearances in the UEFA Conference League) | 0 | 0 | 0 | 19 | 2 |
| Kairat | 2023 | Kazakhstan Premier League | 25 | 1 | 3 | 0 | — | | — | | 28 | 1 |
| Kairat | 2024 | Kazakhstan Premier League | 13 | 3 | 2 | 0 | — | | 3 (Note: Appearances in Kazakhstan League Cup) | 1 | 18 | 4 |
| Kairat | 2025 | Kazakhstan Premier League | 12 | 0 | 1 | 0 | 6 (Note: Appearances in the UEFA Champions League) | 0 | — | | 19 | 0 |
| Kairat | 2026 | Kazakhstan Premier League | 13 | 0 | 0 | 0 | 5 (Note: Four appearances and one goal in UEFA Champions League, one appearance in UEFA Europa League) | 1 | — | | 18 | 1 |
| Kairat | Total | | 74 | 4 | 12 | 2 | 13 | 1 | 3 | 1 | 102 | 8 |
| Kairat Moscow (loan) | 2021–22 | FNL2 | 11 | 1 | 0 | 0 | — | | — | | 11 | 1 |
| Career total | | | 85 | 5 | 15 | 2 | 13 | 1 | 3 | 1 | 116 | 9 |

=== International ===
As of match played 11 June 2024

Kazakhstan national team
| Year | Apps | Goals |
|---|---|---|
| 2022 | 1 | 0 |
| 2024 | 4 | 1 |
| Total | 5 | 1 |

Kazakhstan score listed first, score column indicates score after each Sadybekov goal

List of international goals scored by Adilet Sadybekov
| No. | Date | Venue | Opponent | Score | Result | Competition |
|---|---|---|---|---|---|---|
| 1. | 26 March 2024 | Stade de Luxembourg, Gasperich, Luxembourg | Luxembourg | 1–0 | 1–2 | Friendly |

== Honours ==
Kairat

- Kazakhstan Premier League: 2024, 2025
- Kazakhstan Super Cup: 2025
