= 2021 Africa Cup of Nations qualification Group F =

Football tournament qualifying stage

Group F of the 2021 Africa Cup of Nations qualification tournament was one of the twelve groups that decided one of the teams which qualified for the 2021 Africa Cup of Nations finals tournament. The group consisted of four teams: Cameroon, Cape Verde, Mozambique, and Rwanda.

As the hosts of the 2021 Africa Cup of Nations, Cameroon participated in the qualifiers with the team guaranteed a spot in the finals regardless of its ranking in the group. Their matches and results counted in determining the qualification of the other teams from their group.

The teams played against each other in home-and-away round-robin format, originally scheduled between November 2019 and September 2020.

Due to the COVID-19 pandemic, all matches of matchdays 3 and 4 scheduled for March 2020 were postponed until further notice. FIFA recommended that all June 2020 international matches (matchday 5) be postponed, and also postponed the September 2020 window (matchday 6) for CAF.

On 30 June 2020, the CAF announced the 2021 Africa Cup of Nations final tournament had been postponed from January 2021 to January 2022, without announcing the new dates of the remaining qualifiers. On 19 August 2020, the CAF announced the new dates of the remaining qualifiers, with matchdays 3 and 4 rescheduled to be played between 9–17 November 2020, and matchdays 5 and 6 rescheduled to be played between 22 and 30 March 2021.

Cameroon, the group winners and tournament hosts, were joined by Cape Verde, the group runners-up, in qualifying for the 2021 Africa Cup of Nations.

== Standings ==
Pos	Team	Pld	W	D	L	GF	GA	GD	Pts	Qualification	Cameroon	Cape Verde	Rwanda	Mozambique
1	Cameroon	6	3	2	1	8	4	+4	11	Final tournament	—	0–0	0–0	4–1
2	Cape Verde	6	2	4	0	6	3	+3	10	Final tournament	3–1	—	0–0	2–2
3	Rwanda	6	1	3	2	1	3	−2	6		0–1	0–0	—	1–0
4	Mozambique	6	1	1	4	5	10	−5	4		0–2	0–1	2–0	—

Source: CAF
Rules for classification: Tiebreakers

== Matches ==
13 November 2019
17:00 UTC+1

Cameroon	0–0	Cape Verde
	Report

Ahmadou Ahidjo Stadium, Yaoundé
Referee: Bakary Gassama (Gambia)
14 November 2019
18:00 UTC+2

Mozambique	2–0	Rwanda
Mexer 28' (pen.); Telinho 31'	Report

Estádio do Zimpeto, Maputo
Referee: Raphiou Ligali (Benin)

17 November 2019
18:00 UTC+2

Rwanda	0–1	Cameroon
	Report	Ngamaleu 71'

Stade Régional Nyamirambo, Kigali
Referee: Mutaz Ibrahim Al-Shalmani (Libya)
18 November 2019
15:00 UTC−1

Cape Verde	2–2	Mozambique
Rodrigues 6'; Mendes 57'	Report	Telinho 18'; Witi 90+2'

Estádio Nacional de Cabo Verde, Praia
Referee: Joseph Odey Ogabor (Nigeria)

12 November 2020
15:00 UTC−1

Cape Verde	0–0	Rwanda
	Report

Estádio Nacional de Cabo Verde, Praia
Referee: Daniel Laryea (Ghana)
12 November 2020
17:00 UTC+1

Cameroon	4–1	Mozambique
Aboubakar 38', 47'; Zambo Anguissa 56'; N'Jie 80'	Report	Kamo-Kamo 74'

Stade de la Réunification, Douala
Referee: Kalilou Traore Ibrahim (Ivory Coast)

16 November 2020
18:00 UTC+2

Mozambique	0–2	Cameroon
	Report	Aboubakar 26'; Tabekou 73'

Estádio do Zimpeto, Maputo
Referee: Bernard Camille (Seychelles)
17 November 2020
15:00 UTC+2

Rwanda	0–0	Cape Verde
	Report

Stade Régional Nyamirambo, Kigali
Referee: Andofetra Rakotojaona (Madagascar)

24 March 2021
15:00 UTC+2

Rwanda	1–0	Mozambique
Byiringiro 70'	Report

Stade Régional Nyamirambo, Kigali
Referee: Issa Sy (Senegal)
26 March 2021
15:00 UTC−1

Cape Verde	3–1	Cameroon
Kuca 25'; Bagnack 59' (o.g.); Mendes 69'	Report	Kunde 14'

Estádio Nacional de Cabo Verde, Praia
Referee: Maguette Ndiaye (Senegal)

30 March 2021
20:00 UTC+1

Cameroon	0–0	Rwanda
	Report

Japoma Stadium, Douala
Referee: Mohamed Ali Moussa (Niger)
30 March 2021
21:00 UTC+2

Mozambique	0–1	Cape Verde
	Report	Bangal 58' (o.g.)

Estádio do Zimpeto, Maputo
Referee: Messie Nkounkou (Congo)

== Goalscorers ==
There were 20 goals scored in 12 matches, for an average of 1.67 goals per match.

3 goals

- (Cameroon) Vincent Aboubakar

2 goals

- (Cape Verde) Ryan Mendes
- (Mozambique) Telinho

1 goal

- (Cameroon) Pierre Kunde
- (Cameroon) Clinton N'Jie
- (Cameroon) Moumi Ngamaleu
- (Cameroon) Serge Tabekou
- (Cameroon) André-Frank Zambo Anguissa
- (Cape Verde) Garry Rodrigues
- (Cape Verde) Kuca
- (Mozambique) Mexer
- (Mozambique) Kamo-Kamo
- (Mozambique) Witi
- (Rwanda) Lague Byiringiro

1 own goal

- (Cameroon) Macky Bagnack (against Cape Verde)
- (Mozambique) Faisal Bangal (against Cape Verde)
