= Kamo-Kamo =

Mozambican footballer

Personal information
- Full name: Kevin Cumbane
- Date of birth: 19 July 1999 (age 27)
- Place of birth: Maputo, Mozambique
- Height: 1.69 m (5 ft 7 in)
- Position: Winger

Team information
- Current team: União de Santarém

Youth career
- 2019–: Vitória de Setúbal

Senior career*
Years	Team	Apps	(Gls)
2017–2019	Ferroviário	8	(1)

International career^{‡}
2018	Mozambique U20		(2)
2018–	Mozambique	10	(1)
- * Club domestic league appearances and goals as of 23 July 2020 ‡ National team caps and goals as of 19 July 2026

Kevin Cumbane (born 19 July 1999), commonly known as Kamo-Kamo, is a Mozambican footballer who plays as a forward for Vitória de Setúbal U23 and the Mozambique national football team.

== Career ==
=== International ===
Kamo-Kamo made his senior international debut on 27 May 2018, coming on as a halftime substitute for Isac Carvalho in a 2–1 defeat to Madagascar at the 2018 COSAFA Cup.

== Career statistics ==
=== International ===
As of matches played 30 March 2021.

Appearances and goals by national team and year
National team	Year	Apps	Goals
Mozambique	2018	3	0
Mozambique	2019	4	0
Mozambique	2020	2	1
Mozambique	2021	1	0
Total		10	1

Scores and results list Mozambique's goal tally first, score column indicates score after each Kamo-Kamo goal.

List of international goals scored by Kamo-Kamo
No.	Date	Venue	Opponent	Score	Result	Competition
1	12 November 2020	Reunification Stadium, Douala, Cameroon	Cameroon	1–3	1–4	2021 Africa Cup of Nations qualification
