= Telinho =

Mozambican football player

Personal information
- Full name: Stélio Marcelino Ernesto
- Date of birth: 15 October 1988 (age 38)
- Place of birth: Maputo, Mozambique
- Height: 1.70 m (5 ft 7 in)
- Position: Right winger

Team information
- Current team: Liga Muçulmana
- Number: 26

Senior career*
| Years | Team | Apps | (Gls) |
| 2008 | Liga Muçulmana | | |
| 2009–2010 | Ferroviário Pemba | | |
| 2011–2018 | Liga Muçulmana | | (28) |
| 2012–2013 | → Naval 1º de Maio (loan) | 8 | (1) |
| 2013–2014 | → Ajax Cape Town (loan) | 17 | (1) |
| 2018– | UD Songo | | |

International career^{‡}
| 2011– | Mozambique | 61 | (4) |
- * Club domestic league appearances and goals as of 27 October 2014 ‡ National team caps and goals as of 6 November 2024

Stélio Marcelino Ernesto, better known as Telinho (born 15 October 1988) is a Mozambican football winger who plays for Moçambola club UD Songo and the Mozambique national team.

He previously played for Liga Muçulmana, Ferroviário Pemba, Naval 1º de Maio in Portugal and Ajax Cape Town in South Africa.

Telinho won the Moçambola national title in 2011 and the Taça de Moçambique in 2012 while playing for Liga Muçulmana in Mozambique, making two appearances in the CAF Champions League while scoring once during his tenure with the club as well.

In 2014, Telinho returned to his former club Liga Muçulmana, following an unsuccessful trial with Portuguese] Primeira Liga club C.D. Nacional.

== International career ==
=== International goals ===
Scores and results list Mozambique's goal tally first.

| No. | Date | Venue | Opponent | Score | Result | Competition |
|---|---|---|---|---|---|---|
| 1. | 4 September 2019 | Anjalay Stadium, Belle Vue Harel, Mauritius | Mauritius | 1–0 | 1–0 | 2022 FIFA World Cup qualification |
| 2. | 14 November 2019 | Estádio do Zimpeto, Maputo, Mozambique | Rwanda | 2–0 | 2–0 | 2021 Africa Cup of Nations qualification |
| 3. | 18 November 2019 | Estádio Nacional de Cabo Verde, Praia, Cape Verde | Cape Verde | 1–1 | 2–2 | 2021 Africa Cup of Nations qualification |

== Honours ==
=== Club ===
Liga Muçulmana

- Moçambola: 2011
- Taça de Moçambique: 2012
