= Sergei Kiryakov (footballer, born 1998) =

Russian footballer

Personal information
- Full name: Sergei Yevgenyevich Kiryakov
- Date of birth: 15 July 1998 (age 28)
- Place of birth: Rostov-on-Don, Russia
- Height: 1.76 m (5 ft 9 in)
- Position: Defender

Team information
- Current team: FC Kairat Moscow

Youth career
- FC Rostov

Senior career*
Years	Team	Apps	(Gls)
2015–2018	FC Rostov	0	(0)
2018	FC Inkomsport Yalta	7	(0)
2019–2020	FC Akron Tolyatti	33	(1)
2021	FC Tyumen	6	(0)
2021–	FC Kairat Moscow	27	(0)
- * Club domestic league appearances and goals as of 10 June 2022

Sergei Yevgenyevich Kiryakov (Russian: Сергей Евгеньевич Киряков; born 15 July 1998) is a Russian football player. He plays for FC Kairat Moscow.

== Club career ==
He made his debut in the Russian Football National League for FC Akron Tolyatti on 1 August 2020 in a game against FC Fakel Voronezh, as a starter.
