= Dmitry Sergeyev (footballer) =

Russian footballer

Personal information
- Full name: Dmitry Sergeyevich Sergeyev
- Date of birth: 3 April 2000 (age 26)
- Place of birth: Saint Petersburg, Russia
- Height: 1.83 m (6 ft 0 in)
- Positions: Midfielder; defender

Team information
- Current team: Veles Moscow
- Number: 18

Youth career
- Zenit Saint Petersburg

Senior career*
| Years | Team | Apps | (Gls) |
| 2018–2022 | Zenit Saint Petersburg | 1 | (0) |
| 2018–2021 | → Zenit-2 Saint Petersburg | 53 | (1) |
| 2021 | → Baltika Kaliningrad (loan) | 8 | (0) |
| 2022 | → Zenit-2 Saint Petersburg | 26 | (2) |
| 2023–2024 | Kairat | 44 | (5) |
| 2025–2026 | Arsenal Tula | 7 | (0) |
| 2026 | → Veles Moscow (loan) | 15 | (1) |
| 2026– | Veles Moscow | 0 | (0) |
- * Club domestic league appearances and goals as of 13 June 2026

Dmitry Sergeyevich Sergeyev (Russian: Дмитрий Сергеевич Сергеев; born 3 April 2000) is a Russian professional footballer who plays for Veles Moscow.

== Club career ==
Sergeyev made his professional debut for Zenit-2 Saint Petersburg in the FNL on 4 August 2018 in a game vs Tom Tomsk.

On 23 June 2021, Sergeyev joined FC Baltika Kaliningrad on loan.

Sergeyev made his debut in the Russian Premier League for FC Zenit Saint Petersburg on 21 May 2022 in a game against FC Nizhny Novgorod.

On 28 February 2023, Kazakhstan Premier League club Kairat announced the signing of Sergeyev to a two-year contract, with the option of a third. On 27 November 2024, Kairat announced that Sergeyev had left the club at the end of his contract.

On 13 January 2025, Russian First League club Arsenal Tula, announced the signing of Sergeyev.

== Career statistics ==
As of match played 19 October 2024

| Club | Season | League | | | Cup | | League Cup | | Continental | | Other | | Total | |
| Club | Season | Division | Apps | Goals | Apps | Goals | Apps | Goals | Apps | Goals | Apps | Goals | Apps | Goals |
|---|---|---|---|---|---|---|---|---|---|---|---|---|---|---|
| Zenit St. Petersburg | 2021–22 | RPL | 1 | 0 | 0 | 0 | – | | 0 | 0 | – | | 1 | 0 |
| Zenit St. Petersburg | 2022–23 | RPL | 0 | 0 | 1 | 0 | – | | 0 | 0 | – | | 1 | 0 |
| Zenit St. Petersburg | Total | | 1 | 0 | 1 | 0 | – | | 0 | 0 | – | | 2 | 0 |
| Zenit-2 St. Petersburg | 2018–19 | FNL | 12 | 0 | – | | – | | – | | – | | 12 | 0 |
| Zenit-2 St. Petersburg | 2019–20 | PFL | 17 | 1 | – | | – | | – | | – | | 17 | 1 |
| Zenit-2 St. Petersburg | 2020–21 | PFL | 24 | 0 | – | | – | | – | | – | | 24 | 0 |
| Zenit-2 St. Petersburg | 2021–22 | FNL 2 | 9 | 1 | – | | – | | – | | – | | 9 | 1 |
| Zenit-2 St. Petersburg | 2022–23 | FNL 2 | 17 | 1 | – | | – | | – | | – | | 17 | 1 |
| Zenit-2 St. Petersburg | Total | | 79 | 3 | – | | – | | – | | – | | 79 | 3 |
| Baltika Kaliningrad (loan) | 2021–22 | FNL | 8 | 0 | 1 | 0 | – | | – | | – | | 9 | 0 |
| Kairat | 2023 | KPL | 25 | 4 | 4 | 1 | – | | – | | – | | 29 | 5 |
| Kairat | 2024 | KPL | 19 | 1 | 2 | 0 | 3 | 0 | – | | – | | 24 | 1 |
| Kairat | Total | | 44 | 5 | 6 | 1 | 3 | 0 | – | | – | | 53 | 6 |
| Career total | | | 132 | 8 | 8 | 1 | 3 | 0 | 0 | 0 | 0 | 0 | 143 | 9 |
