= Vadim Ulyanov =

Russian footballer (born 2001)

- Ulyanov with Akhmat Grozny in 2026

Personal information
- Full name: Vadim Andreyevich Ulyanov
- Date of birth: 7 October 2001 (age 25)
- Place of birth: Lyubertsy, Russia
- Height: 1.87 m (6 ft 2 in)
- Position: Goalkeeper

Team information
- Current team: Akhmat Grozny
- Number: 1

Youth career
- 2007–2012: Meteor Balashikha
- 2012–2015: UOR #5 Yegoryevsk
- 2015–2016: Meteor Balashikha
- 2016–2018: Olimp-Skopa Balashikha
- 2020–2021: Strogino Moscow

Senior career*
Years	Team	Apps	(Gls)
2018–2019	Keramik Balashikha		
2019–2020	Vista Gelendzhik		
2020–2021	Strogino Moscow	12	(0)
2021–2022	Kairat Moscow	10	(0)
2022–2025	Kairat	31	(0)
2022–2023	→ Kairat-Zhastar	8	(0)
2025–	Akhmat Grozny	26	(0)
- * Club domestic league appearances and goals as of 31 October 2026

Vadim Andreyevich Ulyanov (Russian: Вадим Андреевич Ульянов; born 7 October 2001) is a Russian football player who plays as a goalkeeper for Akhmat Grozny.

== Career ==
On 15 January 2025, Ulyanov signed a contract with Russian Premier League club Akhmat Grozny until the end of the 2024–25 season, with the club option to extend for three more seasons.

He made his debut in the RPL for Akhmat on 18 May 2025 in a game against Dynamo Makhachkala.

== Career statistics ==
As of 31 October 2026

Club	Season	League			Cup		Continental		Other		Total	
Club	Season	Division	Apps	Goals	Apps	Goals	Apps	Goals	Apps	Goals	Apps	Goals
Strogino Moscow	2020–21	Russian Second League	12	0	0	0	–		–		12	0
Kairat Moscow	2021–22	Russian Second League	10	0	4	0	–		–		14	0
Kairat	2022	Kazakhstan Premier League	5	0	3	0	0	0	0	0	8	0
Kairat	2023	Kazakhstan Premier League	8	0	4	0	0	0	–		12	0
Kairat	2024	Kazakhstan Premier League	18	0	2	0	0	0	2 (Note: Appearances in the Kazakhstan League Cup)	0	22	0
Kairat	Total		31	0	9	0	0	0	2	0	42	0
Kairat-Zhastar	2022	Kazakhstan First League	4	0	–		–		–		4	0
Kairat-Zhastar	2023	Kazakhstan First League	4	0	–		–		–		4	0
Kairat-Zhastar	Total		8	0	0	0	0	0	0	0	8	0
Akhmat Grozny	2024–25	Russian Premier League	2	0	2	0	–		1 (Note: Appearance in the relegation play-offs)	0	5	0
Akhmat Grozny	2025–26	Russian Premier League	13	0	5	0	–		–		18	0
Akhmat Grozny	2026–27	Russian Premier League	11	0	1	0	–		–		12	0
Akhmat Grozny	Total		26	0	8	0	0	0	1	0	35	0
Career total			87	0	21	0	0	0	3	0	111	0

== Honours ==
Kairat

- Kazakhstan Premier League: 2024
