= Júlio Franque =

Mozambican footballer

Personal information
- Full name: Júlio Pedro Franque
- Date of birth: 29 November 1996 (age 29)
- Place of birth: Maputo, Mozambique
- Height: 1.75 m (5 ft 9 in)
- Position: Goalkeeper

Team information
- Current team: Ferroviário

Senior career*
Years	Team	Apps	(Gls)
2016	Estrela Vermelha Maputo		
2017	ENH de Vilankulo		
2018–	Ferroviário	23	(0)

International career^{‡}
2018–	Mozambique	10	(0)
- * Club domestic league appearances and goals as of 22 July 2020 ‡ National team caps and goals as of 25 March 2021

Júlio Pedro Franque (born 29 November 1996) is a Mozambican footballer who plays as a goalkeeper for Ferroviário and the Mozambique national football team.

== Career ==
=== International ===
Franque made his senior international debut on 29 May 2018, keeping a clean sheet in a 3–0 victory over Comoros at the 2018 COSAFA Cup.

== Career statistics ==
=== International ===
As of matches played 18 November 2019.

National team	Year	Apps	Goals
Mozambique	2018	2	0
Mozambique	2019	5	0
Total		7	0
