= Galymzhan Kenzhebek =

Kazakhstani footballer (born 2003)

Personal information
- Full name: Galymzhan Rakhymzhanuly Kenzhebek
- Date of birth: 12 February 2003 (age 23)
- Place of birth: Taraz, Kazakhstan
- Height: 1.77 m (5 ft 10 in)
- Position: Winger

Team information
- Current team: Akhmat Grozny
- Number: 23

Youth career
- –2021: Kairat

Senior career*
Years	Team	Apps	(Gls)
2020–2023	Kairat-Zhastar	30	(12)
2020–2024	Kairat	8	(0)
2022	→ Maktaaral (loan)	22	(3)
2024	→ Zhenis (loan)	10	(0)
2024	Akritas Chlorakas	14	(5)
2025	Košice	9	(1)
2025	Yelimay	11	(6)
2026–	Akhmat Grozny	11	(1)

International career^{‡}
2019	Kazakhstan U17	3	(0)
2021	Kazakhstan U19	3	(1)
2022–2024	Kazakhstan U21	7	(2)
2024–	Kazakhstan	19	(3)
- * Club domestic league appearances and goals as of 7 November 2026 ‡ National team caps and goals as of 16 November 2026

Galymzhan Rakhymzhanuly Kenzhebek (Kazakh: Ғалымжан Рахымжанұлы Кенжебек; born 12 February 2003) is a Kazakhstani professional footballer who plays as a winger for Russian club Akhmat Grozny.

== Early life ==
Kenzhebek was born on 12 February 2003. A native of Taraz, Kazakhstan, he has been nicknamed "Godi".

== Club career ==
Kenzhebek started his career with Kazakhstani side Kairat, where he made eight league appearances and scored zero goals. Kazakhstabi news website Vesti.kz wrote in 2024 that he was "one of the most prominent talents in the history of the modern Kairat academy". Ahead of the 2024–25 season, he signed for Cypriot side Akritas Chlorakas, where he made fourteen league appearances and scored five goals.

Following his stint there, he signed for Slovak side Košice in 2025, where he made nine league appearances and scored one goal. The same year, he signed for Kazakhstani side Yelimay, where he made eleven league appearances and scored six goals.

On 10 January 2026, Kenzhebek signed a four-and-a-half-year contract with the Russian side Akhmat Grozny.

== International career ==
Kenzhebek is a Kazakhstan international. During March, September, and October 2025, he played for the Kazakhstan national football team for 2026 FIFA World Cup qualification.

== Career statistics ==
=== Club ===
As of 7 November 2026

Club	Season	League			Cup		Other		Total	
Club	Season	Division	Apps	Goals	Apps	Goals	Apps	Goals	Apps	Goals
Kairat-Zhastar	2020	Kazakhstan First League	9	2	–		–		9	2
Kairat-Zhastar	2021	Kazakhstan First League	18	9	–		–		18	9
Kairat-Zhastar	2023	Kazakhstan First League	3	1	–		–		3	1
Kairat-Zhastar	Total		30	12	0	0	0	0	30	12
Kairat	2020	Kazakhstan Premier League	1	0	0	0	–		1	0
Kairat	2021	Kazakhstan Premier League	0	0	2	0	–		2	0
Kairat	2023	Kazakhstan Premier League	7	0	2	0	–		9	0
Kairat	Total		8	0	4	0	0	0	12	0
Maktaaral (loan)	2022	Kazakhstan Premier League	22	3	7	3	–		29	6
Zhenis (loan)	2024	Kazakhstan Premier League	10	0	1	0	2 (Note: Appearances in Kazakhstan League Cup)	1	13	1
Akritas Chlorakas	2024–25	Cypriot Second Division	14	5	1	0	–		15	5
Košice	2024–25	Slovak First Football League	9	1	1	0	–		10	1
Yelimay	2025	Kazakhstan Premier League	11	6	0	0	–		11	6
Akhmat Grozny	2025–26	Russian Premier League	7	1	–		–		7	1
Akhmat Grozny	2026–27	Russian Premier League	4	0	3	0	–		7	0
Akhmat Grozny	Total		11	1	3	0	0	0	14	1
Career total			115	28	17	3	2	1	134	32

=== International ===
As of match played 16 November 2026

Appearances and goals by national team and year
National team	Year	Apps	Goals
Kazakhstan	2024	1	0
Kazakhstan	2025	9	3
Kazakhstan	2026	9	0
Total		19	3

==== International goals ====
List of international goals scored by Galymzhan Kenzhebek
No.	Date	Venue	Opponent	Score	Result	Competition
1.	5 June 2025	Borisov Arena, Barysaw, Belarus	Belarus	1–3	1–4	Friendly
2.	10 October 2025	Astana Arena, Astana, Kazakhstan	Liechtenstein	1–0	4–0	2026 FIFA World Cup qualification
3.	10 October 2025	Astana Arena, Astana, Kazakhstan	Liechtenstein	3–0	4–0	2026 FIFA World Cup qualification

== Honours ==
Kairat

- Kazakhstan Cup: 2021
