= Artur Shushenachev =

Kazakhstani footballer

Personal information
- Full name: Artur Gavrilovich Shushenachev
- Date of birth: 7 April 1998 (age 28)
- Place of birth: Taraz, Kazakhstan
- Height: 1.89 m (6 ft 2 in)
- Position: Striker

Team information
- Current team: Aktobe
- Number: 11

Youth career
- –2017: Taraz

Senior career*
Years	Team	Apps	(Gls)
2017–2019	Kairat-Zhastar	69	(20)
2017–2024	Kairat	87	(32)
2024–2025	Hapoel Be'er Sheva	12	(2)
2024–2025	→ Sochi (loan)	10	(0)
2025–	Aktobe	39	(17)

International career^{‡}
2016	Kazakhstan U19	2	(0)
2019–2020	Kazakhstan U21	6	(0)
2021–	Kazakhstan	13	(0)
- * Club domestic league appearances and goals as of 1 November 2026 ‡ National team caps and goals as of 8 October 2026

Artur Gavrilovich Shushenachev (Russian: Артур Гаврилович Шушеначев; born 7 April 1998) is a Kazakh footballer who plays as a striker for Aktobe.

== Club career ==
=== Kairat ===
On 26 August 2017, Shushenachev made his debut for Kairat in a 0–1 away win against Atyrau after coming on as a substitute at 88th minute in place of Chuma Anene. On 3 February 2020, he extended his contract with Kairat until the end of the 2022 season. On 10 January 2023, Shushenachev extended his contract until the end of the 2024 season.

=== Hapoel Be'er Sheva ===
On 6 February 2024, Israeli Premier League club Hapoel Be'er Sheva announced the signing of Shushenachev to a three-and-a-half-year contract.

== International career ==
Shushenachev has represented Kazakhstan at the under-19, under-21, and senior levels. On 1 September 2021, he made his senior debut in a 2022 FIFA World Cup qualification match against Ukraine.

== Career statistics ==
=== Club ===
As of match played 29 October 2023

Appearances and goals by club, season and competition
Club	Season	League			National Cup		Continental		Other		Total	
Club	Season	Division	Apps	Goals	Apps	Goals	Apps	Goals	Apps	Goals	Apps	Goals
Kairat	2017	Kazakhstan Premier League	1	0	0	0	0 (Note: Appearances in the UEFA Europa League)	0	0 (Note: Appearances in the Kazakhstan Super Cup)	0	1	0
Kairat	2018	Kazakhstan Premier League	0	0	3	0	0	0	0	0	3	0
Kairat	2019	Kazakhstan Premier League	3	1	1	0	0	0	0	0	4	1
Kairat	2020	Kazakhstan Premier League	14	3	0	0	0	0	—		14	3
Kairat	2021	Kazakhstan Premier League	19	12	8	6	14 (Note: Four appearances in the UEFA Champions League, two appearances and one goal in the UEFA Europa League, eight appearances and three goals in the UEFA Europa Conference League)	4	2	1	43	23
Kairat	2022	Kazakhstan Premier League	25	8	6	2	2 (Note: Appearances in the UEFA Europa Conference League)	0	1	0	34	10
Kairat	2023	Kazakhstan Premier League	25	8	4	1	—				29	9
Kairat	Total		87	32	22	9	16	4	3	1	128	46
Career total			87	32	22	9	16	4	3	1	128	46

=== International ===
As of match played 14 October 2025

Kazakhstan
Year	Apps	Goals
2021	3	0
2022	3	0
2024	2	0
Total	8	0

d

== Honours ==
Kairat

- Kazakhstan Premier League: 2020
- Kazakhstan Cup: 2021
