= Viktor Vasin =

Russian footballer

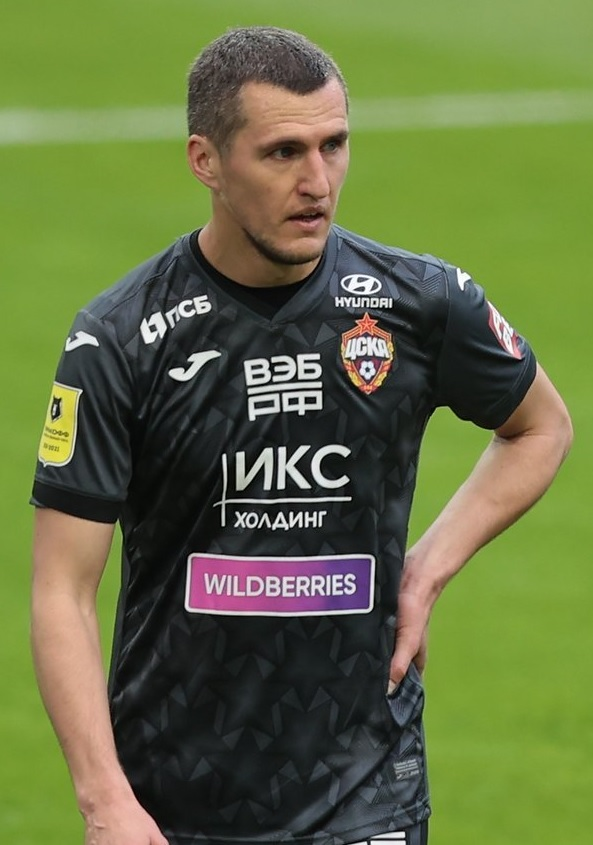
- Vasin with CSKA in 2021

Personal information
- Full name: Viktor Vladimirovich Vasin
- Date of birth: 6 October 1988 (age 38)
- Place of birth: Leningrad, USSR
- Height: 1.92 m (6 ft 4 in)
- Position: Defender

Youth career
- 1999–2005: DYuSSh Smena Saint Petersburg

Senior career*
Years	Team	Apps	(Gls)
2006–2010	Spartak Nalchik	25	(1)
2009	→ Nizhny Novgorod (loan)	31	(1)
2011–2021	CSKA Moscow	71	(2)
2014–2015	→ Mordovia Saransk (loan)	30	(2)
2016	→ Ufa (loan)	17	(0)
2022–2024	Kairat	55	(3)

International career
2010	Russia U21	1	(0)
2012	Russia B	2	(0)
2010–2017	Russia	13	(2)
- * Club domestic league appearances and goals

Viktor Vladimirovich Vasin (Russian: Виктор Владимирович Васин; born 6 October 1988) is a Russian former professional footballer who played as a centre-back.

== Career ==
=== Club ===
On 26 April 2019, Vasin signed a new contract with CSKA Moscow, keeping him at the club until the summer of 2021.

On 22 February 2022, Vasin signed for FC Kairat on a contract until the end of 2022. On 13 November 2023, Vasin extended his contract with Kairat until the end of 2024. On 19 July 2024, Kairat announced that Vasin had left the club by mutual agreement.

=== International ===
He was called up for the Russia national football team for the friendly game against Belgium on 17 November 2010 and made his debut in that game.

== Career statistics ==
=== Club ===
As of match played 14 July 2024

Club	Season	League			Cup		League Cup		Continental		Other		Total	
Club	Season	Division	Apps	Goals	Apps	Goals	Apps	Goals	Apps	Goals	Apps	Goals	Apps	Goals
Spartak Nalchik	2006	Russian Premier League	0	0	0	0	–		–		–		0	0
Spartak Nalchik	2007	Russian Premier League	1	0	0	0	–		–		–		1	0
Spartak Nalchik	2008	Russian Premier League	4	0	0	0	–		–		–		4	0
Spartak Nalchik	2009	Russian Premier League	0	0	0	0	–		–		–		0	0
Spartak Nalchik	2010	Russian Premier League	20	1	1	0	–		–		–		21	1
Spartak Nalchik	Total		25	1	1	0	-	-	-	-	-	-	26	1
Nizhny Novgorod (loan)	2009	FNL	31	1	3	1	–		–		–		34	2
CSKA Moscow	2011–12	Russian Premier League	4	0	0	0	–		0	0	0	0	4	0
CSKA Moscow	2012–13	Russian Premier League	0	0	3	0	–		0	0	–		3	0
CSKA Moscow	2013–14	Russian Premier League	0	0	1	0	–		0	0	0	0	1	0
CSKA Moscow	2014–15	Russian Premier League	0	0	0	0	–		0	0	0	0	0	0
CSKA Moscow	2015–16	Russian Premier League	3	0	3	0	–		1	0	–		7	0
CSKA Moscow	2016–17	Russian Premier League	13	0	0	0	–		0	0	0	0	13	0
CSKA Moscow	2017–18	Russian Premier League	16	2	1	0	–		12	0	0	0	29	2
CSKA Moscow	2018–19	Russian Premier League	6	0	0	0	–		0	0	0	0	6	0
CSKA Moscow	2019–20	Russian Premier League	11	0	1	0	–		0	0	–		12	0
CSKA Moscow	2020–21	Russian Premier League	13	0	1	0	–		3	0	–		17	0
CSKA Moscow	2021–22	Russian Premier League	5	0	1	0	–		–		–		6	0
CSKA Moscow	Total		71	2	11	0	-	-	16	0	0	0	98	2
Mordovia Saransk (loan)	2014–15	Russian Premier League	30	2	3	2	–		–		–		33	4
Ufa (loan)	2016–17	Russian Premier League	17	0	0	0	–		–		–		17	0
Kairat	2022	Kazakhstan Premier League	24	2	5	1	–		2	0	1	0	32	3
Kairat	2023	Kazakhstan Premier League	23	1	2	0	–		–		–		25	1
Kairat	2024	Kazakhstan Premier League	8	0	1	0	2	0	–		–		11	0
Kairat	Total		55	3	8	1	2	0	2	0	1	0	68	4
Career total			229	9	26	4	2	0	18	0	1	0	276	13

=== International ===
Russia national team
Year	Apps	Goals
2010	1	0
2011	0	0
2012	0	0
2013	0	0
2014	0	0
2015	1	0
2016	1	0
2017	10	2
Total	13	2

As of match played 14 November 2017.

=== International goals ===
Scores and results list Russia's goal tally first.

No	Date	Venue	Opponent	Score	Result	Competition
1.	28 March 2017	Fisht Olympic Stadium, Sochi, Russia	Belgium	1–0	3–3	Friendly
2.	9 June 2017	VEB Arena, Moscow, Russia	Chile	1–1	1–1	Friendly

== Honours ==
CSKA Moscow

- Russian Premier League (2): 2012–13, 2013–14
- Russian Cup (1): 2012–13
- Russian Super Cup (1): 2013
