= Macky Bagnack =

Cameroonian professional footballer

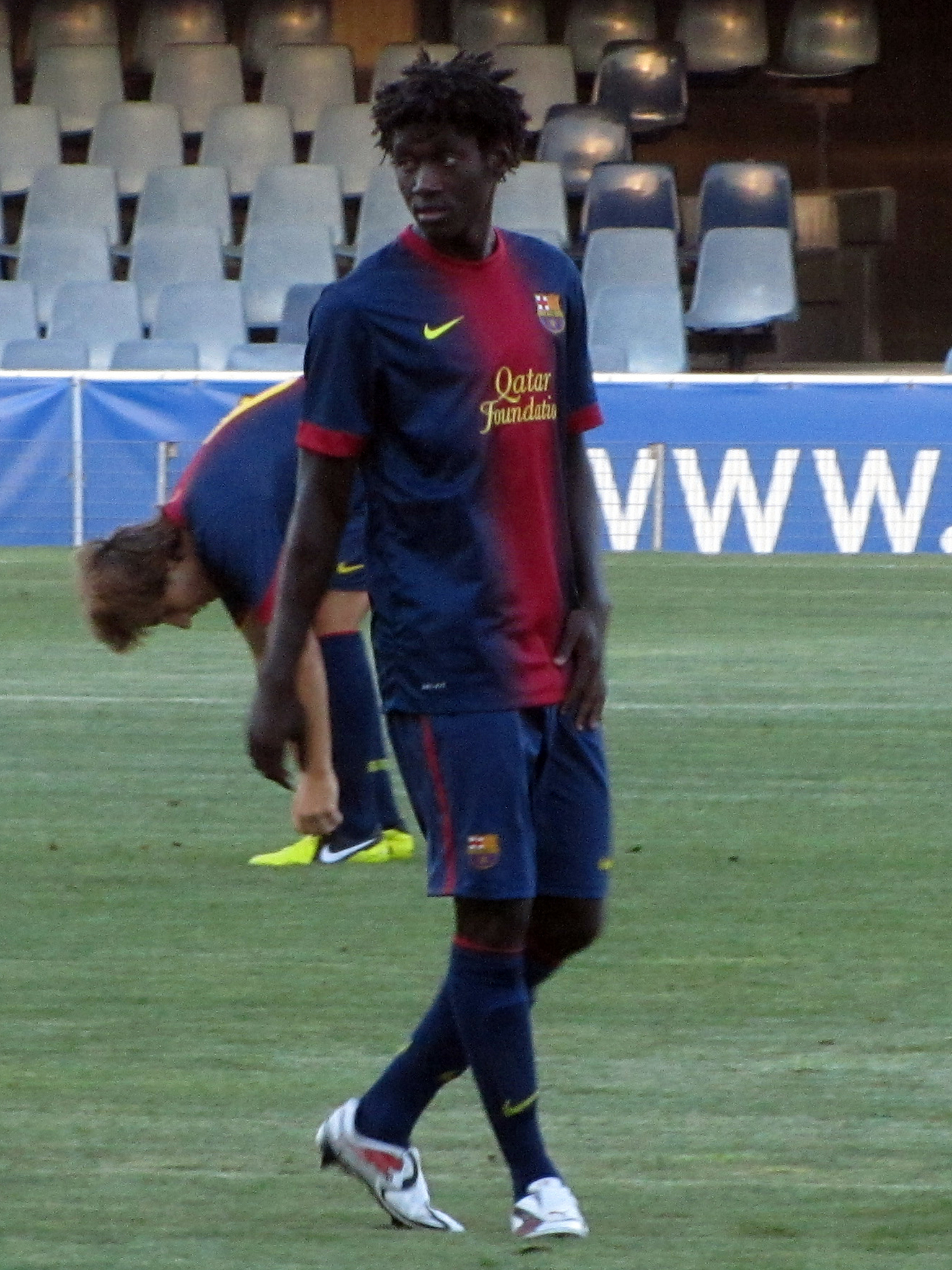
- Bagnack with Barcelona B in 2012

Personal information
- Full name: Macky Frank Bagnack Mouegni
- Date of birth: 7 June 1995 (age 31)
- Place of birth: Yaoundé, Cameroon
- Height: 1.87 m (6 ft 2 in)
- Position: Centre-back

Team information
- Current team: Primorje
- Number: 88

Youth career
- Samuel Eto'o Academy
- 2008–2013: Barcelona

Senior career*
Years	Team	Apps	(Gls)
2012–2016	Barcelona B	43	(1)
2016	Nantes II	8	(0)
2016–2017	Zaragoza	7	(0)
2017–2018	Admira Wacker	1	(0)
2018–2020	Olimpija Ljubljana	62	(2)
2020–2021	Partizan	18	(0)
2021–2023	Kairat	43	(2)
2023	→ Pari Nizhny Novgorod (loan)	1	(0)
2024–2025	TSC	6	(1)
2026–	Primorje	3	(0)

International career^{‡}
- Cameroon U20
2015–	Cameroon	4	(0)
- * Club domestic league appearances and goals as of 7 November 2024 ‡ National team caps and goals as of 14 June 2023

Macky Frank Bagnack Mouegni (born 7 June 1995) is a Cameroonian professional footballer who plays as a defender for Slovenian First League club Primorje.

== Club career ==
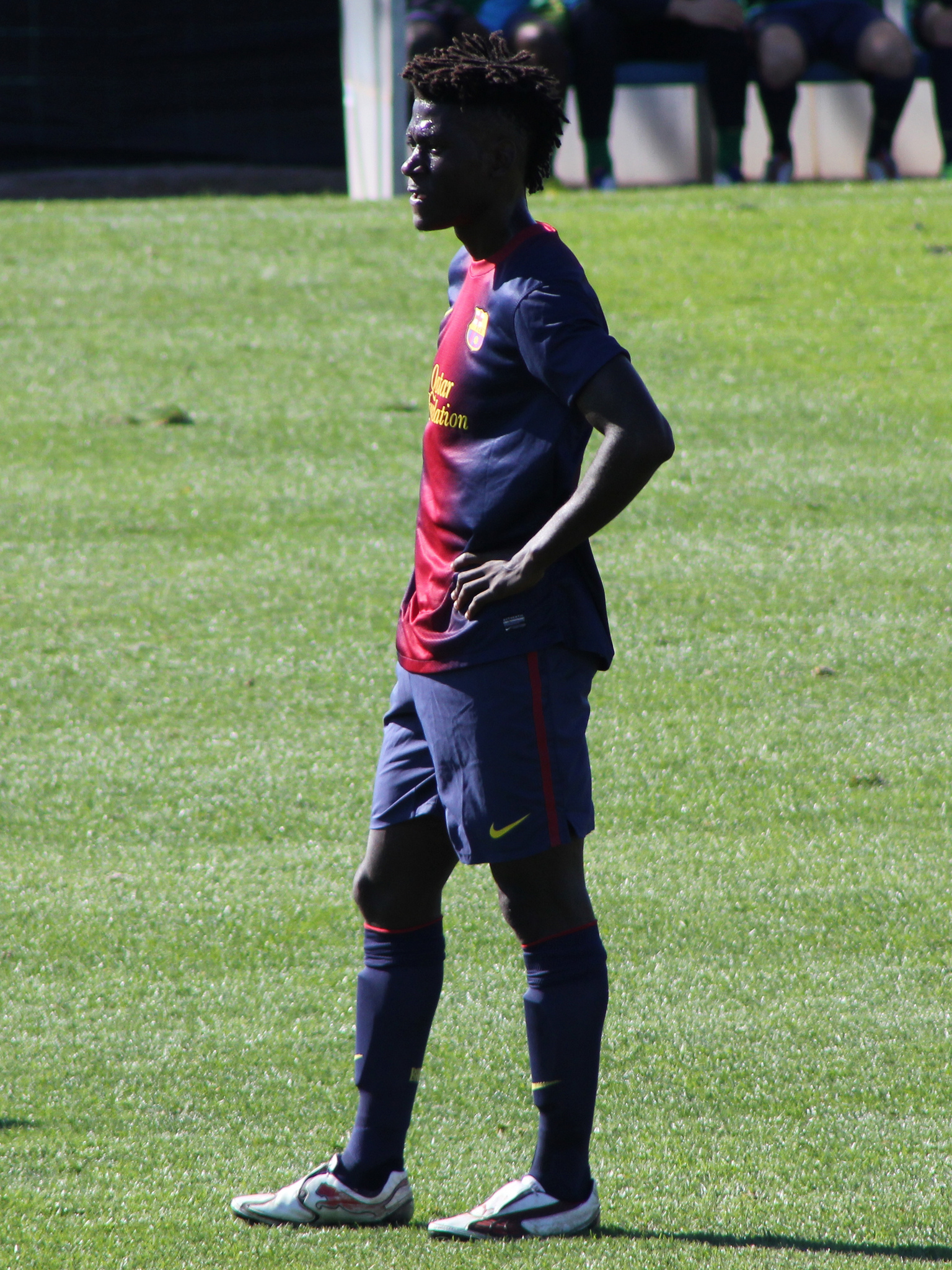
Bagnack playing for Barcelona B

Born in Yaoundé, Bagnack came to FC Barcelona in 2008, through the Samuel Eto'o Foundation at the age of 13. He was promoted to the reserves on 3 August 2012.

Bagnack made his professional debut on 8 September 2012, replacing Kiko Femenía in the 75th minute of a 1–0 away win against Guadalajara in the Segunda División. However, it was his maiden appearance of the campaign.

Bagnack profited from David Lombán and Marc Muniesa's departures in 2013–14, appearing in 24 matches. He renewed his link with the Catalans on 28 January 2014, running until 2017, and scored his first goal on 7 June, netting the second of a 2–1 away win against Hércules.

In the 2014–15 season, Bagnack received eleven yellow cards and one red in a campaign which saw his team relegated to Segunda División B, his expulsion coming in a 1–0 loss at Real Betis on 8 November. On 12 January 2016, he rescinded his contract with Barça, and signed for Nantes shortly after.

On 31 August 2016, Bagnack returned to Spain after signing a one-year deal with Real Zaragoza.

In 2018, Bagnack signed a contract with the Slovenian Olimpia Ljubljana, where he spent two successful seasons.

On 27 July 2020, Bagnack signed a three-year contract with Partizan.

In July 2021, he signed a contract with Kairat in Kazakhstan until December 2023. On 31 January 2023, Bagnack joined Pari Nizhny Novgorod on loan until June 2023, with an option to make the move permanent. On 1 December 2023, Kairat announced that Bagnack had left the club at the end of his contract.

On April 4, he returned to Serbia and signed with TSC as a late winter-break signing.

== International career ==
After appearing with Cameroon under-20's, Bagnack was named in the senior squad for the 2015 Africa Cup of Nations. On 7 January 2015, he made his debut for Cameroon in a friendly against DR Congo. He came in as a half-time substitute, replacing Raoul Loé and playing the entire second half.

In August 2017, he was part of the Cameroon U23 team playing at the 2017 Islamic Solidarity Games held in Baku, Azerbaijan.

== Career statistics ==
=== Club ===
As of match played 21 October 2023

Appearances and goals by club, season and competition
Club	Season	League			Cup		Europe		Other		Total	
Club	Season	Division	Apps	Goals	Apps	Goals	Apps	Goals	Apps	Goals	Apps	Goals
Barcelona B	2012–13	Segunda Division	1	0	—		—		—		1	0
Barcelona B	2013–14	Segunda Division	24	1	—		—		—		24	1
Barcelona B	2014–15	Segunda Division	18	0	—		—		—		18	0
Barcelona B	Total		43	1	—		—		—		43	1
Nantes II	2015–16	Championnat de France Amateur	7	0	0	0	—		—		7	0
Nantes II	2016–17	Championnat de France Amateur	1	0	0	0	—		—		1	0
Nantes II	Total		8	0	0	0	—		—		8	0
Zaragoza	2016–17	Segunda División	7	0	1	0	—		—		8	0
Admira Wacker	2017–18	Austrian Bundesliga	1	0	0	0	—		—		1	0
Olimpija Ljubljana	2018–19	Slovenian PrvaLiga	23	1	4	0	5	0	—		32	1
Olimpija Ljubljana	2019–20	Slovenian PrvaLiga	25	1	1	0	4	0	—		30	1
Olimpija Ljubljana	Total		48	2	5	0	9	0	—		62	2
Partizan	2020–21	Serbian SuperLiga	16	0	0	0	2	0	—		18	0
Kairat	2021	Kazakhstan Premier League	6	0	5	0	10	1	—		21	1
Kairat	2022	Kazakhstan Premier League	8	0	2	0	2	0	1	0	13	0
Kairat	2023	Kazakhstan Premier League	11	1	0	0	—		—		11	1
Kairat	Total		25	1	7	0	12	1	1	0	45	2
Pari Nizhny Novgorod (loan)	2022–23	Russian Premier League	0	0	0	0	—		1	0	1	0
Career total			148	4	13	0	23	1	2	0	186	5

=== International ===
As of 15 January 2015

Appearances and goals by national team and year
National team	Year	Apps	Goals
Cameroon	2015	2	0
Cameroon	2020	1	0
Cameroon	2021	1	0
Total		4	0
