= Aybar Abdulla =

Kazakhstani footballer

Personal information
- Date of birth: 22 January 2002 (age 24)
- Place of birth: Karaganda, Kazakhstan
- Height: 1.77 m (5 ft 10 in)
- Position: Forward

Team information
- Current team: Atyrau
- Number: 9

Senior career*
Years	Team	Apps	(Gls)
2020–2021	Kairat-Zhas	10	(0)
2020–2021	Kairat	2	(0)
2021–2022	Kairat Moscow	17	(3)
2022–2023	Kairat	4	(0)
2023–2025	Shakhter Karagandy	30	(2)
2025–2026	Aktobe	7	(0)
2025	→ Turan (loan)	6	(0)
2026–	Atyrau	14	(1)

International career^{‡}
2024–	Kazakhstan U21	9	(3)
- * Club domestic league appearances and goals as of 1 November 2026 ‡ National team caps and goals as of 16 October 2024

Aybar Abdulla (Kazakh: Айбар Абдулла; born 22 January 2002) is a Kazakhstani footballer who plays as a forward for Atyrau.

== Career statistics ==
=== Club ===
As of 24 November 2020.

Club	Season	League			Cup		Continental		Other		Total	
Club	Season	Division	Apps	Goals	Apps	Goals	Apps	Goals	Apps	Goals	Apps	Goals
Kairat-Zhas	2020	Pervaya Liga	10	0	–		–		0	0	10	0
Kairat	2020	Premier Liga	1	0	0	0	0	0	0	0	1	0
Career total			11	0	0	0	0	0	0	0	11	0
