= Vyacheslav Shvyryov =

Kazakhstani footballer

Personal information
- Full name: Vyacheslav Sergeyevich Shvyryov
- Date of birth: 7 January 2001 (age 25)
- Place of birth: Almaty, Kazakhstan
- Height: 1.76 m (5 ft 9 in)
- Position: Forward

Team information
- Current team: Zhetysu
- Number: 18

Youth career
- Kairat

Senior career*
Years	Team	Apps	(Gls)
2018–2024	Kairat	84	(10)
2021	→ Akzhayik (loan)	9	(1)
2021	→ Kairat Moscow (loan)	12	(5)
2025	Ordabasy	7	(0)
2025	Aktobe	7	(0)
2026	Irtysh	15	(0)
2026–	Zhetysu	8	(0)

International career^{‡}
2017–2018	Kazakhstan U-17	4	(0)
2019–2022	Kazakhstan U-21	8	(1)
- * Club domestic league appearances and goals as of 1 November 2026 ‡ National team caps and goals as of 29 March 2022

Vyacheslav Sergeyevich Shvyryov (Russian: Вячеслав Сергеевич Швырёв; born 7 January 2001) is a Kazakh football player who plays for Zhetysu.

== Club career ==
Shvyryov made his Kazakhstan Premier League debut for FC Kairat on 11 March 2018 in a game against FC Kyzylzhar.

On 25 February 2022, Shvyryov signed a two-year contract with Kairat.

== International ==
At the age of 17, he was called up to the Kazakhstan national football team for a friendly against Azerbaijan in June 2018, but did not appear in the game.

== Career statistics ==
=== Club ===
As of the match played on 14 November 2021

Appearances and goals by club, season and competition
Club	Season	League			National Cup		Continental		Other		Total	
Club	Season	Division	Apps	Goals	Apps	Goals	Apps	Goals	Apps	Goals	Apps	Goals
Kairat	2018	Kazakhstan Premier League	9	0	5	1	2 (Note: Appearances in the UEFA Europa League)	0	0 (Note: Appearances in the Kazakhstan Super Cup)	0	16	1
Kairat	2019	Kazakhstan Premier League	10	2	2	0	0	0	1	0	13	2
Kairat	2020	Kazakhstan Premier League	0	0	0	0	0	0	0	0	0	0
Kairat	2021	Kazakhstan Premier League	0	0	0	0	0 (Note: Appearances in the UEFA Champions League)	0	0	0	0	0
Kairat	Total		19	2	7	1	2	0	1	0	29	3
Akzhayik (loan)	2021	Kazakhstan Premier League	9	1	0	0	—		—		9	1
Kairat Moscow (loan)	2021–22	FNL 2	12	5	5	4	—		—		17	9
Career total			41	8	11	5	2	0	1	0	55	13
