= Danil Ustimenko =

Kazakhstani footballer

Personal information
- Full name: Danil Vyacheslavovich Ustimenko
- Date of birth: 8 August 2000 (age 26)
- Place of birth: Almaty, Kazakhstan
- Height: 1.90 m (6 ft 3 in)
- Position: Goalkeeper

Team information
- Current team: Tobol
- Number: 44

Youth career
- –2019: Kairat

Senior career*
Years	Team	Apps	(Gls)
2019–2024	Kairat	59	(0)
2021–2022	→ Kairat-Zhastar	5	(0)
2025–	Tobol	32	(0)

International career^{‡}
2016	Kazakhstan U17	3	(0)
2017–2018	Kazakhstan U19	6	(0)
2021–2023	Kazakhstan U21	9	(0)
- * Club domestic league appearances and goals as of 1 November 2026 ‡ National team caps and goals as of 23 November 2023

Danil Vyacheslavovich Ustimenko (Russian: Данил Вячеславович Устименко; born 8 August 2000) is a Kazakh footballer who plays as a goalkeeper for Tobol.

== Club career ==
Ustimenko made his professional debut for Kairat in the Kazakhstan Premier League on 1 July 2020, starting in the home match against Zhetysu, which finished as a 3–0 win.
