= Sultanbek Astanov =

Kazakhstani footballer

Personal information
- Full name: Sultanbek Astanuly Astanov
- Date of birth: 23 March 1999 (age 27)
- Place of birth: Shymkent, Kazakhstan
- Height: 1.80 m (5 ft 11 in)
- Positions: Right back; right midfielder

Team information
- Current team: Ordabasy
- Number: 22

Youth career
- Football OSDYuShOR Shymkent
- –2016: Ordabasy
- 2016–2018: Kairat

Senior career*
Years	Team	Apps	(Gls)
2018–2019	Kairat Zhastar	32	(7)
2019–2023	Kairat	52	(2)
2021	→ Ordabasy (loan)	8	(1)
2023–	Ordabasy	84	(4)

International career^{‡}
2015	Kazakhstan U17	2	(0)
2017	Kazakhstan U19	7	(0)
2019–2020	Kazakhstan U21	3	(0)
2021–	Kazakhstan	8	(0)
- * Club domestic league appearances and goals as of 13:33, 31 October 2026 (UTC) ‡ National team caps and goals as of 18 November 2025

Sultanbek Astanuly Astanov (Kazakh: Сұлтанбек Астанұлы Астанов, Sūltanbek Astanūly Astanov; born 23 March 1999) is a Kazakh professional footballer who plays as a right-back or right midfielder for Kazakhstan Premier League club Ordabasy and the Kazakhstan national team.

== International career ==
He made his debut for Kazakhstan national football team on 16 November 2021 in a friendly against Tajikistan.

== Career statistics ==
=== International ===
As of match played 18 November 2025

Appearances and goals by national team and year
National team	Year	Apps	Goals
Kazakhstan
Kazakhstan	2026	1	0
Kazakhstan	2022	0	0
Kazakhstan	2023	0	0
Kazakhstan	2024	3	0
Kazakhstan	2025	4	0
Total		8	0

== Honours ==
Ordabasy

- Kazakhstan Premier League: 2026
- Kazakhstan Cup: 2026
