= FC Kairat Moscow =

Russian football team based in Moscow

- Full name: Football Club Kairat Moscow
- Founded: 2021
- Dissolved: 2022
- Ground: Centralny Stadium Odintsovo
- Capacity: 2,500
- League: FNL 2, Group 2
- 2021–22: 5th

FC Kairat Moscow (Russian: ФК «Кайрат» Москва) was a Russian football team based in Moscow. It was founded in 2021 as a farm-club for Kazakhstan club FC Kairat and was licensed for the third-tier Russian FNL 2 for the 2021–22 season. Kazakhstan is a member of the Eurasian Economic Union, and thus Kazakhstan players are not considered foreign players for the purposes of Russian football regulations, those regulations otherwise prohibit third-tier clubs from signing any players who would not be eligible to play for the Russian national team.

== History ==
In January 2022, Kirill Keker was appointed as Head Coach of Kairat Moscow.

=== Domestic history ===
Season	League									Russian Cup	Top goalscorer		Manager
Season	Div.	Pos.	Pl.	W	D	L	GS	GA	P	Russian Cup	Name	League	Manager
2021–22	3rd	6th	21	8	5	8	29	35	29	R32	(Russia) Nikita Matskharashvili	7	(Kazakhstan) Evgeniy Kostrub / (Kazakhstan) Kirill Keker

== Final squad ==
As of 1 July 2022

Note: Flags indicate national team as defined under FIFA eligibility rules; some limited exceptions apply. Players may hold more than one non-FIFA nationality.

No.	Pos.	Nation	Player
1	GK	(Kazakhstan) KAZ	Dinmukhammed Zhomart
3	DF	(Russia) RUS	Roman Kvataniya
5	DF	(Kazakhstan) KAZ	Lev Kurgin
7	FW	(Kazakhstan) KAZ	Aybar Abdulla
8	MF	(Kazakhstan) KAZ	Rustam Emirov
11	FW	(Kazakhstan) KAZ	Bayzhan Madelkhan
13	GK	(Russia) RUS	Ilya Ivanov
16	FW	(Kazakhstan) KAZ	Alen Aymanov
17	MF	(Kazakhstan) KAZ	Daniyar Alimzhan
19	MF	(Russia) RUS	Sergei Pryakhin (on loan from CSKA Moscow)
20	MF	(Russia) RUS	Andrei Savinov (on loan from CSKA Moscow)

No.	Pos.	Nation	Player
23	DF	(Russia) RUS	Sergei Kiryakov
41	DF	(Kazakhstan) KAZ	Aleksandr Shirobokov (on loan from Kairat)
42	DF	(Kazakhstan) KAZ	Adilet Sadybekov
42	MF	(Kazakhstan) KAZ	Sagi Anet
51	MF	(Russia) RUS	Daniil Makhonin
52	MF	(Russia) RUS	Timur Tanachev
53	MF	(Russia) RUS	Mikhail Afanasyev
55	FW	(Kazakhstan) KAZ	Aleksandr Bovkun
99	GK	(Kazakhstan) KAZ	Nikita Pivkin

== Managers ==
Information correct as of match played 14 November 2021. Only competitive matches are counted.

Nat.	Name	From	To	P	W	D	L	GS	GA	%W	Honours	Notes
Kazakhstan	Evgeniy Kostrub	1 July 2021	13 January 2022	23	9	5	9	28	34	39.13		
Kazakhstan	Kirill Keker	13 January 2022	8 June 2022	12	6	3	3	21	16	50.00		

- Notes:

P – Total of played matches W – Won matches D – Drawn matches L – Lost matches GS – Goal scored GA – Goals against
%W – Percentage of matches won

Nationality is indicated by the corresponding FIFA country code(s).
