= 2021 FC Caspiy season =

FC Caspiy
2021 season
- Manager: Srđan Blagojević
- Stadium: Karasai Stadium
- Premier League: 8th
- Kazakhstan Cup: Quarterfinal vs Astana
- Top goalscorer: League: David Karayev (6); All: Ruslan Mingazow (7)
- Highest home attendance: 1,300 vs Astana (29 May 2021)
- Lowest home attendance: 0 vs Taraz (23 April 2021) 0 vs Tobol (28 April 2021); 0 vs Turan (11 July 2021); 0 vs Zhetysu (25 July 2021); 0 vs Kairat (15 August 2021); 0 vs Kyzylzhar (3 October 2021) 0 vs Akzhayik (24 October 2021)
- Average home league attendance: 609 (24 October 2021)
Home colours	Away colours

The 2021 FC Caspiy season was Caspiy's second season back in the Kazakhstan Premier League, the highest tier of association football in Kazakhstan, since 2001. Caspiy would also take part in the Kazakhstan Cup.

== Season events ==
On 26 February, Caspiy announced the signings of Taras Bondarenko, Chafik Tigroudja, Aslan Darabayev and Ruslan Mingazow.

On 1 March, Caspiy announced the signing of Aleksey Zaleski, David Karayev on loan from Ural Yekaterinburg and Talgat Kusyapov and Ramazan Karimov on loan from Astana.

On 5 March, Caspiy announced the signing of Maksim Gladchenko and Nikola Cuckić, whilst Niyaz Shugaev joined on loan from Shakhter Karagandy.

On 15 July, Stefan Bukorac joined Shakhter Karagandy on loan for the remainder of the season.

On 22 July, Arman Nusip left Caspiy after his contract was terminated by mutual consent.

On 30 July, Caspiy announced the loan signings of Jean-Ali Payruz from Shakhter Karagandy and Uladzimir Khvashchynski from Dinamo Minsk, both on contracts till the end of the season.

== Squad ==
As of match played 30 October 2021

No.	Name	Nationality	Position	Date of birth (age)	Signed from	Signed in	Contract ends	Apps.	Goals
Goalkeepers
1	Nurlybek Ayazbaev	(Kazakhstan)	GK	24 January 1991 (age 35)	Zhetysu	2020		11	0
35	Olzhas Mukhanov	(Kazakhstan)	GK	27 October 1997 (age 28)	Bayterek	2018			
91	Marko Milošević	(Serbia)	GK	7 February 1991 (age 34)	Napredak Kruševac	2020		44	0
Defenders
6	Aleksey Zaleski	(Belarus)	DF	7 October 1994 (age 31)	Minsk	2021		28	5
14	Taras Bondarenko	(Ukraine)	DF	23 September 1992 (age 33)	Okzhetpes	2021		37	1
17	Ruslan Zhanysbaev	(Kazakhstan)	DF	4 November 1995 (age 30)	Atyrau	2020			
19	Maksat Taykenov	(Kazakhstan)	DF	14 August 1997 (age 28)	Bayterek	2017			
22	Talgat Kusyapov	(Kazakhstan)	DF	14 February 1999 (age 26)	loan from Astana	2021			
25	Anuar Bekmyrza	(Kazakhstan)	DF	7 May 2001 (age 24)	Youth Team	2021		0	0
33	Ilya Vorotnikov	(Kazakhstan)	DF	1 February 1986 (age 40)	Taraz	2019			
98	Niyaz Shugaev	(Kazakhstan)	DF	14 September 1998 (age 27)	loan from Shakhter Karagandy	2021		3	0
Midfielders
5	Miras Tuliev	(Kazakhstan)	MF	30 August 1994 (age 31)	Okzhetpes	2021		4	0
7	Bekzat Kabylan	(Kazakhstan)	MF	3 March 1996 (age 29)	Youth Team	2016			
9	Ruslan Mingazow	(Turkmenistan)	MF	23 November 1991 (age 34)	Shakhter Karagandy	2021		26	7
11	Aslan Darabayev	(Kazakhstan)	MF	21 January 1989 (age 37)	Zhetysu	2021		31	5
13	Ruslan Sakhalbaev]	(Kazakhstan)	MF	27 June 1984 (age 41)	Okzhetpes	2019			
15	Jean-Ali Payruz	(Kazakhstan)	MF	12 August 1999 (age 26)	loan from Shakhter Karagandy	2021	2021	9	0
21	Maksim Gladchenko	(Kazakhstan)	MF	19 April 1997 (age 28)	Akzhayik	2021		2	0
23	Amandyk Nabikhanov	(Kazakhstan)	MF	9 November 1997 (age 28)	Youth Team	2017			
24	Nikola Cuckić	(Serbia)	MF	11 April 1997 (age 28)	Aktobe	2021		30	2
48	Chafik Tigroudja	(France)	MF	16 January 1992 (age 34)	USP Grand Avignon	2021		30	3
77	Miloš Stanojević	(Serbia)	MF	20 November 1993 (age 32)	Unattached	2021		8	0
Forwards
8	Uladzimir Khvashchynski	(Belarus)	FW	10 May 1990 (age 35)	loan from Dinamo Minsk	2021	2021	12	0
10	Almas Armenov	(Kazakhstan)	FW	27 January 1992 (age 34)	Okzhetpes	2019			
18	Nenad Gavrić	(Serbia)	FW	12 December 1991 (age 34)	Radnički Niš	2021		8	2
71	Kuandyk Nursultanov	(Kazakhstan)	FW	24 April 1999 (age 26)	Atyrau	2020		2	0
81	Ramazan Karimov	(Kazakhstan)	FW	5 July 1999 (age 26)	loan from Astana	2021		25	5
Players away on loan
8	Stefan Bukorac	(Serbia)	MF	15 February 1991 (age 34)	Torpedo-BelAZ Zhodino	2020		38	1
Left during the season
15	David Karayev	(Russia)	FW	10 March 1995 (age 30)	loan from Ural Yekaterinburg	2021	2021	18	6
47	Arman Nusip	(Kazakhstan)	MF	22 January 1994 (age 32)	Irtysh Pavlodar	2020		30	2
77	Wajdi Sahli	(Tunisia)	FW	17 April 1997 (age 28)	Unattached	2021		21	6

=== Out on loan ===
Note: Flags indicate national team as defined under FIFA eligibility rules; some limited exceptions apply. Players may hold more than one non-FIFA nationality.

No.	Pos.	Nation	Player
8	MF	SRB	Stefan Bukorac (at Shakhter Karagandy)

== Transfers ==
=== In ===
Date	Position	Nationality	Name	From	Fee	Ref.
21 February 2021	MF	(Tunisia)	Wajdi Sahli	Unattached	Free	
26 February 2021	DF	(Ukraine)	Taras Bondarenko	Okzhetpes	Undisclosed	
26 February 2021	MF	(France)	Chafik Tigroudja	USP Grand Avignon	Undisclosed	
26 February 2021	MF	(Kazakhstan)	Aslan Darabayev	Zhetysu	Undisclosed	
26 February 2021	MF	(Turkmenistan)	Ruslan Mingazow	Shakhter Karagandy	Undisclosed	
1 March 2021	DF	(Belarus)	Aleksey Zaleski	Minsk	Undisclosed	
5 March 2021	MF	(Kazakhstan)	Maksim Gladchenko	Akzhayik	Undisclosed	
5 March 2021	MF	(Serbia)	Nikola Cuckić	Aktobe	Undisclosed	
4 April 2021	MF	(Kazakhstan)	Miras Tuliev	Okzhetpes	Undisclosed	
27 August 2021	MF	(Serbia)	Miloš Stanojević	Unattached	Free	
27 August 2021	FW	(Serbia)	Nenad Gavrić	Radnički Niš	Undisclosed	

=== Loans in ===
Date from	Position	Nationality	Name	From	Date to	Ref.
1 March 2021	DF	(Kazakhstan)	Talgat Kusyapov	Astana	End of season	
1 March 2021	FW	(Kazakhstan)	Ramazan Karimov	Astana	End of season	
1 March 2021	FW	(Russia)	David Karayev	Ural Yekaterinburg	30 June 2021	
5 March 2021	DF	(Kazakhstan)	Niyaz Shugaev	Shakhter Karagandy	End of season	
30 July 2021	MF	(Kazakhstan)	Jean-Ali Payruz	Shakhter Karagandy	End of season	
30 July 2021	FW	(Belarus)	Uladzimir Khvashchynski	Dinamo Minsk	End of season	

=== Out ===
Date	Position	Nationality	Name	To	Fee	Ref.
17 August 2021	MF	(Tunisia)	Wajdi Sahli	Apollon Smyrnis	Undisclosed	

=== Loans out ===
Date from	Position	Nationality	Name	To	Date to	Ref.
15 July 2021	MF	(Serbia)	Stefan Bukorac	Shakhter Karagandy	End of season	

=== Released ===
Date	Position	Nationality	Name	Joined	Date	Ref.
22 July 2021	MF	(Kazakhstan)	Arman Nusip	Taraz		

== Competitions ==
=== Overview ===
Competition	First match	Last match	Starting round	Record							
Competition	First match	Last match	Starting round	Pld	W	D	L	GF	GA	GD	Win %
Premier League	14 March 2021	29 October 2021	Matchday 1	26	8	8	10	35	35	+0	30.77
Kazakhstan Cup	11 July 2021		Group Stage	6	4	1	1	10	4	+6	66.67
Total				32	12	9	11	45	39	+6	37.50

Last updated: 30 October 2021
Source: Competitions

=== Premier League ===
==== Results summary ====
Overall								Home						Away					
Pld	W	D	L	GF	GA	GD	Pts	W	D	L	GF	GA	GD	W	D	L	GF	GA	GD
26	8	8	10	35	35	0	32	5	6	2	19	14	+5	3	2	8	16	21	−5

Last updated: 30 October 2021.
Source: See Results

==== Results by round ====
Round	1	2	3	4	5	6	7	8	9	10	11	12	13	14	15	16	17	18	19	20	21	22	23	24	25	26
Ground	H	A	H	A	H	A	H	H	A	H	A	H	A	H	A	H	A	H	A	A	H	A	H	A	H	A
Result	D	L	W	L	D	D	W	W	L	D	L	W	W	D	W	L	L	D	L	L	W	D	L	L	D	W
Position	6	8	7	7	9	8	7	7	7	8	10	8	5	6	4	5	7	8	8	8	7	7	8	10	9	8

Source: See Results
A = Away; H = Home; W = Win; D = Draw; L = Loss

==== Results ====
14 March 2021 1	Caspiy	1 – 1	Aktobe	Aktau
15:00 (UTC+6)	Karayev (yellow card) 49'; Sahli 52' (yellow card) 79'; M.Taykenov (yellow card) 90+2'	Report	Sergeev (yellow card) 30'; Doumbia (yellow card) 40'; R.Temirkhan (yellow card) 43'; Fedin 61' (pen.); Jeřábek (yellow card) 74'	Stadium: Zhastar Stadium; Attendance: 900; Referee: Alexander Gauser

19 March 2021 2	Astana	2 – 0	Caspiy	Nur-Sultan
18:00 (UTC+6)	Ebong 17' (yellow card) 86'; Tomasov 45+1' (pen.) (yellow card) 65'; S.Smajlagić (yellow card) 84'; Haroyan (yellow card) 90'	Report	A.Nabikhanov (yellow card) 25'; Sahli (yellow card) 45+1'	Stadium: Astana Arena; Attendance: 0 Referee: Bakhyt Kyzylbaev
Note: Match played behind closed doors due to the COVID-19 pandemic in Kazakhstan.

4 April 2021 3	Caspiy	2 – 0	Zhetysu	Aktau
16:00 (UTC+6)	Mingazow (yellow card) 8' (goal) 83'; Sahli 12' (pen.); Vorotnikov (yellow card) 35'	Report	Dmitrijev (yellow card) 81'	Stadium: Zhastar Stadium; Attendance: 900; Referee: Saken Bayimbet

10 April 2021 4	Kaisar	2 – 1	Caspiy	Kyzylorda
18:00 (UTC+6)	Baizhanov (yellow card) 45+1'; Laukžemis 47'; Kenesov (yellow card) 54'; B.Kurmanbekuly (yellow card) 57'; S.Abzalov 81'	Report	Mingazow 26'; Vorotnikov (yellow card) 49'	Stadium: Gani Muratbayev Stadium; Attendance: 1,200; Referee: Sayat Karabaev

14 April 2021 5	Caspiy	1 – 1	Kairat	Aktau
15:00 (UTC+6)	Mingazow 33'; R.Sakhalbaev (yellow card) 37'; M.Taykenov (yellow card) 73'	Report	Alip (yellow card) 21'; Abiken (yellow card) 29' (yellow-red card) 36'; Pokatilov (yellow card) 37'; Alykulov (yellow card) 37'; Palyakow 41'; Kosović (yellow card) 90+5'	Stadium: Zhastar Stadium; Attendance: 1,000; Referee: Denis Tevyashov

19 April 2021 6	Turan	2 – 2	Caspiy	Turkistan
19:00 (UTC+6)	T.Amirov (yellow card) 50'; Stanley 60', 67'	Report	A.Nusip 31'; Karayev (yellow card) 81' (goal) 84'	Stadium: Turkistan Arena; Attendance: 0 Referee: Bolat Karlibaev
Note: Match played behind closed doors due to the COVID-19 pandemic in Kazakhstan.

23 April 2021 7	Caspiy	1 – 0	Taraz	Aktau
16:00 (UTC+6)	A.Nabikhanov (yellow card) 11'; Sahli 31' (pen.); A.Nusip (yellow card) 37'; Karimov (yellow card) 60'; Milošević (yellow card) 87'	Report	B.Shaykhov (yellow card) 67'; Kódjo (yellow card) 90+5'	Stadium: Zhastar Stadium; Attendance: 0 Referee: Artem Kuchin
Note: Match played behind closed doors due to the COVID-19 pandemic in Kazakhstan.

28 April 2021 8	Caspiy	2 – 1	Tobol	Aktau
15:00 (UTC+6)	Darabayev (yellow card) 4'; Karayev 31'; Cuckić 72'	Report	Silva (yellow card) 24'; Valiullin (yellow card) 50'; Omirtayev 90+4'	Stadium: Zhastar Stadium; Attendance: 0 Referee: Grigory Moskovchenko
Note: Match played behind closed doors due to the COVID-19 pandemic in Kazakhstan.

2 May 2021 9	Atyrau	2 – 1	Caspiy	Atyrau
18:00 (UTC+6)	Bryan 16'; Alex Bruno 19'; Guz (yellow card) 41'; R. Ospanov (yellow card) 59'; S.Tastanbekov (yellow card) 90+4'; Ayrapetyan (yellow card) 90+5'	Report	Karayev 40' (pen.); Mingazow (yellow card) 83'; A.Nabikhanov (yellow card) 90+4'	Stadium: Munaishy Stadium; Attendance: 0 Referee: Rustam Omarov
Note: Match played behind closed doors due to the COVID-19 pandemic in Kazakhstan.

8 May 2021 10	Caspiy	0 – 0	Ordabasy	Aktau
18:00 (UTC+6)	Bukorac (yellow card) 71'	Report	Yerlanov (yellow card) 32'; Kleshchenko (yellow card) 72'	Stadium: Zhastar Stadium; Attendance: 950; Referee: Sergei Nozhenko

15 May 2021 11	Kyzylzhar	2 – 0	Caspiy	Petropavl
15:00 (UTC+6)	Danilo 21'; Koné (yellow card) 39'; T.Muldinov 53'; A.Kasym (yellow card) 62'	Report	Darabayev (yellow card) 23'; A.Nabikhanov (yellow card) 45'; Bukorac (yellow card) 61'	Stadium: Karasai Stadium; Attendance: 1,800; Referee: Aidyn Rakhimbaev

19 May 2021 12	Caspiy	3 – 0	Shakhter Karagandy	Aktau
18:00 (UTC+6)	Karayev 2', 31'; Sahli 9'; Zaleski (yellow card) 52'; Bukorac (yellow card) 60'; Cuckić (yellow card) 78'; A.Armenov (penalty missed) 90+3'	Report	Sultanov (yellow card) 29'; Udo (yellow card) 47'; M.Galkin (yellow card) 84'	Stadium: Zhastar Stadium; Attendance: 1,200; Referee: Alexander Gauzer

24 May 2021 13	Akzhayik	0 – 3	Caspiy	Oral
20:00 (UTC+6)		Report	Sahli 36'; Karayev 67'; R.Sakhalbaev 90+4'	Stadium: Petr Atoyan Stadium; Attendance: 560; Referee: Grigory Moskovchenko

29 May 2021 14	Caspiy	2 – 2	Astana	Aktau
18:00 (UTC+6)	M.Taykenov (yellow card) 45'; T.Kusyapov 52'; Darabayev 61'	Report	Barseghyan 8'; Murtazayev 30'; Kuat (yellow card) 46'; Šimunović (yellow card) 90'	Stadium: Zhastar Stadium; Attendance: 1,300; Referee: Igor Chesnokov

12 June 2021 15	Zhetysu	0 – 1	Caspiy	Taldıqorğan
18:00 (UTC+6)	Zhaksylykov (penalty missed) 64'; Dmitrijev (yellow card) 71'; D.Kalybaev (yellow card) 90'	Report	Tigroudja 18'; Darabayev (yellow card) 42'; B.Kabylan (yellow card) 49'	Stadium: Zhetysu Stadium; Attendance: 750; Referee: Alexander Zatula

19 June 2021 16	Caspiy	2 – 4	Kaisar	Aktau
20:00 (UTC+6)	M.Taykenov (yellow card) 29'; Mingazow (yellow card) 36' (goal) 86'; T.Kusyapov (yellow card) 56'; Darabayev (yellow card) 81'; Karimov 90+2'	Report	Bitang 25'; E.Altynbekov (yellow card) 29' (yellow-red card) 30'; Narzildayev (yellow card) 68' (goal) 85'; Laukžemis 74', 78'; Bayzhanov (yellow card) 75'; N.Salaidin (yellow card) 90+5'	Stadium: Zhastar Stadium; Attendance: 900; Referee: Sayat Karabaev

23 June 2021 17	Kairat	5 – 1	Caspiy	Almaty
19:00 (UTC+6)	A.Shushenachev 8'; Vágner Love 25', 71'; Hovhannisyan 83'; Alykulov 90'	Report	Mingazow 73' (yellow card) 80'	Stadium: Central Stadium; Attendance: 6,000; Referee: Bolat Karlibaev

28 June 2021 18	Caspiy	0 – 0	Turan	Aktau
20:00 (UTC+6)	Tigroudja (yellow card) 34'; Darabayev (yellow card) 81'	Report	An.Zaleski (yellow card) 90+6'	Stadium: Zhastar Stadium; Attendance: 1,000; Referee: Sergey Nozhenko

4 July 2021 19	Taraz	1 – 0	Caspiy	Taraz
19:00 (UTC+6)	Kódjo (yellow card) 51'; Eugénio 57'; Obilor (yellow card) 73'; D.Evstingeyev (yellow card) 81'; Akhmetov (yellow card) 87'	Report	Karimov (yellow card) 39'; Darabayev (yellow card) 45+2'; Bukorac (yellow card) 51'; T.Kusyapov (yellow card) 62'; A.Nabikhanov (yellow card) 84'; R.Zhanysbaev (red card) 86'	Stadium: Central Stadium; Attendance: 3,000; Referee: Sergey Gorokhovodatsky

12 September 2021 20	Tobol	2 – 1	Caspiy	Kostanay
20:00 (UTC+6)	Malyi 15'; Jovančić (yellow card) 43'; Brígido (red card) 68'; Amanović 77'; Zharynbetov (yellow card) 85'	Report	Karimov 40'; Darabayev (yellow card) 41'; Gavrić (yellow card) 45+1'; Stanojević (yellow card) 90'	Stadium: Central Stadium; Attendance: 700; Referee: Bulat Sariev

18 September 2021 21	Caspiy	2 – 1	Atyrau	Aktau
18:00 (UTC+6)	Gavrić 59'; Darabayev 70' (pen.)	Report	Gian 67' (pen.); Guz (yellow card) 69'; D.Kayralliev (yellow card) 77'	Stadium: Zhastar Stadium; Attendance: 700; Referee: Bolat Karlibaev

27 September 2021 22	Ordabasy	1 – 1	Caspiy	Shymkent
19:00 (UTC+6)	Khlyobas 28'; S.Astanov (yellow card) 49'	Report	Darabayev 32' (yellow card) 74'; B.Kabylan (yellow card) 39'; Mingazow (yellow card) 79'	Stadium: Kazhymukan Munaitpasov Stadium; Attendance: 800; Referee: Daniyar Sakhi

3 October 2021 23	Caspiy	1 – 2	Kyzylzhar	Aktau
17:00 (UTC+6)	A.Nabikhanov (yellow card) 8'; Zaleski 32' (pen.); Taykenov (yellow card) 56'; Mingazow (yellow card) FT'	Report	Koné (yellow card) 8' (goal) 39'; D.Shmidt (yellow card) 31'; Kasym 43'; Yakovlev (yellow card) 87'	Stadium: Zhastar Stadium; Attendance: 0 Referee: Igor Chesnokov

16 October 2021 24	Shakhter Karagandy	1 – 0	Caspiy	Karaganda
17:00 (UTC+6)	Graf (yellow card) 50'; Gabyshev (yellow card) 51'; Mawutor (yellow card) 64'; Umayev 73'	Report	A.Nabikhanov (yellow card) 62'; Darabayev (yellow card) 88'	Stadium: Shakhter Stadium; Attendance: 3,000; Referee: Sergey Nozhenko

24 October 2021 25	Caspiy	2 – 2	Akzhayik	Aktau
17:00 (UTC+6)	Zaleski 15', 30' (pen.); Milošević (yellow card) 34'; Darabayev (yellow card) 56'; Gavrić (yellow card) 63'; Stanojević (yellow card) 90'	Report	B.Omarov (yellow card) 31'; Chychykov 46'; Gashchenkov 69' (yellow card) 73'; L.Imnadze (yellow card) 71'	Stadium: Zhastar Stadium; Attendance: 0 Referee: Sayat Karabaev
Note: Match played behind closed doors due to the COVID-19 pandemic in Kazakhstan.

30 October 2021 26	Aktobe	1 – 5	Caspiy	Aktobe
16:00 (UTC+6)	Žulpa (yellow card) 19'; Logvinenko (yellow card) 27'; A.Tanzharikov (red card) 77'; Fedin (yellow card) 81'; Samorodov 85'; R.Temirkhan (yellow card) 90+1'	Report	Stanojević (yellow card) 15'; Darabayev (yellow card) 23' (goal) 33'; N.Ayazbaev (yellow card) 27'; Gavrić 45'; Karimov 50'; Tigroudja 60'; Zaleski 88'	Stadium: Central Stadium; Attendance: 5,700; Referee: Aydin Tasybaev

==== League table ====
Pos	Team	Pld	W	D	L	GF	GA	GD	Pts
6	Shakhter Karagandy	26	9	6	11	25	34	−9	33
7	Aktobe	26	9	6	11	35	40	−5	33
8	Caspiy	26	8	8	10	35	35	0	32
9	Akzhayik	26	9	5	12	25	31	−6	32
10	Taraz	26	7	8	11	27	34	−7	29

Source: UEFA, Soccerway
Rules for classification: 1) Points; 2) Goal difference; 3) Matches won; 4) Goals scored; 5) Away goals scored; 6) Head-to-head points; 7) Head-to-head matches won; 8) Head-to-head goal difference; 9) Head-to-head goals scored; 10) Head-to-head away goals scored; 11) Draw.

=== Kazakhstan Cup ===
==== Group stage ====
Pos	Team	Pld	W	D	L	GF	GA	GD	Pts	Qualification
1	Caspiy (A)	6	4	1	1	10	4	+6	13	Advanced to Quarterfinals
2	Kairat (A)	6	3	0	3	11	9	+2	9	Advanced to Quarterfinals
3	Zhetysu	6	2	1	3	3	5	−2	7	
4	Turan	6	2	0	4	5	11	−6	6	

Updated to match(es) played on 15 August 2021. Source: PFLK
(A) Advance to a further round

11 July 2021 1	Caspiy	4 – 0	Turan	Aktau
20:00 (UTC+6)	Bondarenko (yellow card) 6'; Mingazow 26', 34'; Karimov 42'; B.Kabylan 80'; Sahli (yellow card) 90+1'	Report	Stojanović (yellow card) 31'; N.Buribayev (yellow card) 83'; Adams (yellow card) 89'	Stadium: Zhastar Stadium; Attendance: 0 Referee: Sayat Karabaev
Note: Match played behind closed doors.

17 July 2021 2	Kairat	0 – 2	Caspiy	Almaty
19:00 (UTC+6)	Seydakhmet (yellow card) 30'; Ustimenko (red card) 32'; S.Keiler (yellow card) 65'; A.Buranchiev (yellow card) 73'	Report	Cuckić 39' (yellow card) 58'; T.Kusyapov (yellow card) 43'; Zaleski 54'; Tigroudja (yellow card) 82'; M.Tuliev (yellow card) 90+2'	Stadium: Central Stadium; Attendance: 1,500; Referee: Denis Izmailov

25 July 2021 3	Caspiy	1 – 0	Zhetysu	Aktau
20:00 (UTC+6)	Cuckić (yellow card) 44'; Sahli 76'; R.Zhanysbaev (yellow card) 90+1'	Report	A.Baltabekov (yellow card) 49'; Kalpachuk (yellow card) 52'	Stadium: Zhastar Stadium; Attendance: 0 Referee: Alexander Zatula
Note: Match played behind closed doors due to the COVID-19 pandemic in Kazakhstan.

1 August 2021 4	Zhetysu	0 – 0	Caspiy	Taldıqorğan
18:00 (UTC+6)	Enache (penalty missed) 57'	Report	N.Ayazbaev (yellow card) 56'	Stadium: Zhetysu Stadium; Attendance: 0 Referee: Bolat Karlibaev
Note: Match played behind closed doors due to the COVID-19 pandemic in Kazakhstan.

8 August 2021 5	Turan	0 – 1	Caspiy	Turkistan
21:00 (UTC+6)	G.Nazarov (yellow card) 80'	Report	T.Kusyapov 28'; M.Taykenov (yellow card) 80'	Stadium: Turkistan Arena; Attendance: 0 Referee: Artem Kuchin
Note: Match played behind closed doors due to the COVID-19 pandemic in Kazakhstan.

15 August 2021 6	Caspiy	2 – 4	Kairat	Aktau
20:00 (UTC+6)	Tigroudja 41' (yellow card) 54'; Karimov 45+1'; A.Nabikhanov (yellow card) 45+3'; Zaleski (yellow card) 68'; Mingazow (yellow card) 74'	Report	Dugalić 6', 34' (yellow card) 23'; Abiken 9'; Kanté 44'; Hovhannisyan (yellow card) 45+3'; A.Buranchiev (yellow card) 90+2'	Stadium: Zhastar Stadium; Attendance: 0 Referee: Maxim Bogdanov
Note: Match played behind closed doors due to the COVID-19 pandemic in Kazakhstan.

==== Knockout stages ====
21 August 2021 Quarterfinal 1st leg	Astana	3 – 3	Caspiy	Nur-Sultan
19:00 (UTC+6)	Ebong 4'; Kuat (yellow card) 17'; Aymbetov 36'; Tomašević (yellow card) 63' (goal) 84'; Šimunović (yellow card) 80'; Barseghyan (yellow card) 80'; Cadete (yellow card) 90+4'	Report	Darabayev (yellow card) 21' (goal) 90+5'; M.Taykenov 39' (pen.); R.Zhanysbaev 45'; J-A.Payruz (yellow card) 56'; Mingazow (yellow card) 80'	Stadium: Astana Arena; Attendance: 0 Referee: Denis Tevyashov
Note: Match played behind closed doors due to the COVID-19 pandemic in Kazakhstan.

22 September 2021 Quarterfinal 2nd leg	Caspiy	0 – 1 (a.e.t.) (3 – 4 agg.)	Astana	Aktau
18:00 (UTC+6)	Zaleski (red card) 2'; T.Kusyapov (yellow card) 33'; Taykenov (yellow card) 68'; Gavrić (yellow card) 88'; N.Ayazbaev (yellow card) 120+1'	Report	S.Sagnayev (yellow card) 12'; L.Skvortsov (yellow card) 36'; Beysebekov (yellow card) 51'; Ebong (yellow card) 62' (yellow-red card) 120'; Ciupercă (yellow card) 90' (yellow-red card) 106'; Kuat (yellow card) 90+4' (goal) 116'; Barseghyan (yellow card) 93'; S.Sovet (yellow card) 100'	Stadium: Zhastar Stadium; Attendance: 1,500; Referee: Saken Bayimbet

== Squad statistics ==
As of match played 30 October 2021

=== Appearances and goals ===
No.	Pos	Nat	Player	Total		Premier League		Kazakhstan Cup	
No.	Pos	Nat	Player	Apps	Goals	Apps	Goals	Apps	Goals
1	GK	(Kazakhstan) KAZ	Nurlybek Ayazbaev	10	0	2+1	0	7	0
5	MF	(Kazakhstan) KAZ	Miras Tuliev	4	0	0	0	1+3	0
6	DF	(Belarus) BLR	Aleksey Zaleski	28	5	17+5	4	6	1
7	MF	(Kazakhstan) KAZ	Bekzat Kabylan	27	1	5+14	0	3+5	1
8	FW	(Belarus) BLR	Uladzimir Khvashchynski	12	0	1+6	0	1+4	0
9	MF	(Turkmenistan) TKM	Ruslan Mingazow	26	7	17+3	5	6	2
10	FW	(Kazakhstan) KAZ	Almas Armenov	5	0	0+4	0	0+1	0
11	MF	(Kazakhstan) KAZ	Aslan Darabayev	31	5	18+6	4	7	1
13	MF	(Kazakhstan) KAZ	Ruslan Sakhalbaev	30	2	10+14	1	3+3	1
14	DF	(Ukraine) UKR	Taras Bondarenko	34	0	26	0	7+1	0
15	MF	(Kazakhstan) KAZ	Jean-Ali Payruz	9	0	1+3	0	4+1	0
17	DF	(Kazakhstan) KAZ	Ruslan Zhanysbaev	14	0	0+8	0	0+6	0
18	FW	(Serbia) SRB	Nenad Gavrić	8	2	6+1	2	1	0
19	DF	(Kazakhstan) KAZ	Maksat Taykenov	31	1	24	0	7	1
21	MF	(Kazakhstan) KAZ	Maksim Gladchenko	1	0	0	0	1	0
22	DF	(Kazakhstan) KAZ	Talgat Kusyapov	24	2	15+1	1	7+1	1
23	MF	(Kazakhstan) KAZ	Amandyk Nabikhanov	31	0	18+5	0	8	0
24	MF	(Serbia) SRB	Nikola Cuckić	30	2	9+14	1	5+2	1
33	DF	(Kazakhstan) KAZ	Ilya Vorotnikov	9	0	9	0	0	0
48	MF	(France) FRA	Chafik Tigroudja	30	3	17+6	2	4+3	1
71	FW	(Kazakhstan) KAZ	Kuandyk Nursultanov	1	0	0	0	0+1	0
77	MF	(Serbia) SRB	Miloš Stanojević	8	0	3+4	0	0+1	0
81	FW	(Kazakhstan) KAZ	Ramazan Karimov	23	5	7+11	3	5	2
91	GK	(Serbia) SRB	Marko Milošević	25	0	24	0	1	0
98	DF	(Kazakhstan) KAZ	Niyaz Shugaev	3	0	0+1	0	0+2	0
Players away from Caspiy on loan:
8	MF	(Serbia) SRB	Stefan Bukorac	20	0	19	0	1	0
Players who left Caspiy during the season:
15	FW	(Russia) RUS	David Karayev	18	6	16+2	6	0	0
47	MF	(Kazakhstan) KAZ	Arman Nusip	14	1	7+6	1	0+1	0
77	FW	(Tunisia) TUN	Wajdi Sahli	21	6	16+1	5	3+1	1

=== Goal scorers ===
Place	Position	Nation	Number	Name	Premier League	Kazakhstan Cup	Total
1	MF	(Turkmenistan)	9	Ruslan Mingazow	5	2	7
2	FW	(Russia)	15	David Karayev	6	0	6
2	FW	(Tunisia)	77	Wajdi Sahli	5	1	6
4	MF	(Kazakhstan)	11	Aslan Darabayev	4	1	5
4	DF	(Belarus)	6	Aleksey Zaleski	4	1	5
4	FW	(Kazakhstan)	81	Ramazan Karimov	3	2	5
7	MF	(France)	48	Chafik Tigroudja	2	1	3
8	FW	(Serbia)	18	Nenad Gavrić	2	0	2
8	MF	(Serbia)	24	Nikola Cuckić	1	1	2
8	DF	(Kazakhstan)	22	Talgat Kusyapov	1	1	2
8	MF	(Kazakhstan)	13	Ruslan Sakhalbaev	1	1	2
12	MF	(Kazakhstan)	47	Arman Nusip	1	0	1
12	MF	(Kazakhstan)	7	Bekzat Kabylan	0	1	1
12	DF	(Kazakhstan)	19	Maksat Taykenov	0	1	1
				TOTALS	35	13	48

=== Clean sheets ===
Place	Position	Nation	Number	Name	Premier League	Kazakhstan Cup	Total
1	GK	(Serbia)	91	Marko Milošević	7	0	7
2	GK	(Kazakhstan)	1	Nurlybek Ayazbaev	0	5	5
				TOTALS	7	5	12

=== Disciplinary record ===
Number	Nation	Position	Name	Premier League		Kazakhstan Cup		Total	
Number	Nation	Position	Name	Booked	Sent off (straight red)	Booked	Sent off (straight red)	Booked	Sent off (straight red)
1	(Kazakhstan)	GK	Nurlybek Ayazbaev	1	0	2	0	3	0
5	(Kazakhstan)	MF	Miras Tuliev	0	0	1	0	1	0
6	(Belarus)	DF	Aleksey Zaleski	1	0	1	1	2	1
7	(Kazakhstan)	MF	Bekzat Kabylan	2	0	0	0	2	0
9	(Turkmenistan)	MF	Ruslan Mingazow	5	0	2	0	7	0
11	(Kazakhstan)	MF	Aslan Darabayev	11	0	1	0	12	0
13	(Kazakhstan)	MF	Ruslan Sakhalbaev	1	0	0	0	1	0
14	(Ukraine)	DF	Taras Bondarenko	0	0	1	0	1	0
15	(Kazakhstan)	MF	Jean-Ali Payruz	0	0	1	0	1	0
17	(Kazakhstan)	DF	Ruslan Zhanysbaev	0	1	1	0	1	1
18	(Serbia)	FW	Nenad Gavrić	2	0	1	0	3	0
19	(Kazakhstan)	DF	Maksat Taykenov	5	0	2	0	7	0
22	(Kazakhstan)	DF	Talgat Kusyapov	2	0	2	0	4	0
23	(Kazakhstan)	MF	Amandyk Nabikhanov	7	0	1	0	8	0
24	(Serbia)	MF	Nikola Cuckić	1	0	2	0	3	0
33	(Kazakhstan)	DF	Ilya Vorotnikov	2	0	0	0	2	0
48	(France)	MF	Chafik Tigroudja	1	0	2	0	3	0
77	(Serbia)	MF	Miloš Stanojević	3	0	0	0	3	0
81	(Kazakhstan)	FW	Ramazan Karimov	2	0	0	0	2	0
91	(Serbia)	GK	Marko Milošević	2	0	0	0	2	0
Players away on loan:
8	(Serbia)	MF	Stefan Bukorac	4	0	0	0	4	0
Players who left Caspiy during the season:
15	(Russia)	FW	David Karayev	2	0	0	0	2	0
47	(Kazakhstan)	MF	Arman Nusip	1	0	0	0	1	0
77	(Tunisia)	FW	Wajdi Sahli	2	0	1	0	3	0
			TOTALS	55	1	21	1	76	2
