= 2021 Kazakhstan Cup =

Tournament details
- Country: Kazakhstan
- Teams: 28

Final positions
- Champions: Kairat
- Runners-up: Shakhter Karagandy

Tournament statistics
- Matches played: 73
- Goals scored: 227 (3.11 per match)
- All statistics correct as of 21 November 2021.

The 2021 Kazakhstan Cup is the 29th season of the Kazakhstan Cup, the annual nationwide football cup competition of Kazakhstan since the independence of the country. FC Kaisar are defending champions having beaten FC Atyrau in the final on 6 October 2019 to win their second Kazakhstan Cup, with the 2020 edition of the cup being cancelled due to the COVID-19 pandemic in Kazakhstan.

== Participating clubs ==
The following 28 teams qualified for the competition:

Premier League all clubs of season 2021	First League; Six clubs of season 2021	Second League; Eight clubs of season 2021
Aktobe; Akzhayik; Astana; Atyrau; Caspiy; Kairat; Kaisar; Kyzylzhar; Ordabasy; Shakhter Karagandy; Taraz; Tobol; Turan; Zhetysu	Aksu; Ekibastuz; Igilik; Kyran; Makhtaaral; Okzhetpes	Altai Semey; Jenis; Ontustik Academy; Ruzayevka; SD Family; SDYuShOR 8; Yassy-Turkestan; Zhas Kyran

== First round ==
22 April 2021	Ruzayevka	1 – 3	Yassy-Turkestan	Almaty
14:00 (UTC+6)	Salauat Gabdulakhmet 13'	Report	Kuandyk Ilimov 22'; Khayam Ahmedov 24' (o.g.); Shyngys Samenov (yellow card) 36'; Nursundet Esmakhanbet (yellow card) 37'; Zhenis Abuov 55'; Torekul Ersultan (yellow card) 90'	Stadium: Almaty Arena; Attendance: 0 Referee: Daniyar Kurbanov
Note: Match played behind closed doors due to the COVID-19 pandemic in Kazakhstan.

22 April 2021	SD Family	0 – 9	Kyran	Nur-Sultan
14:00 (UTC+6)		Report	Amal Seitov 2', 60', 78'; Serikzhan Abzhal 6'; Bekzat Zhaksybayuly 23'; Danabek Kuanyshbay 40'; Baglan Boribay 53', 68'; Zhanserik Kaldybay 66'	Stadium: Astana Arena; Attendance: 0 Referee: Vladimir Niklevich
Note: Match played behind closed doors due to the COVID-19 pandemic in Kazakhstan.

22 April 2021	Zhas Kyran	0 – 2	Makhtaaral	Almaty
14:00 (UTC+6)	Ilyar Sautov (yellow card) 26'	Report	Dierjon Aripov 35'; Arman Tolegenov 80'; Maxim Vaganov (yellow card) 88'	Stadium: Zhas Kyran; Attendance: 0 Referee: Galymzhan Kenzhalinov
Note: Match played behind closed doors due to the COVID-19 pandemic in Kazakhstan.

22 April 2021	Ekibastuz	3 – 3 (a.e.t.)	Aksu	Ekibastuz
15:00 (UTC+6)	Matvey Matvienko 3' (pen.), 53' (yellow card) 118'; Vladimir Vomenko (yellow card) 30'; Esen Zhasanov (yellow card) 69'; Danil Tsoi (yellow card) 72'; Sayat Zhumagali 80'; Aslanbek Kakimov (yellow card) 90+3'	Report	Valery Lenkov (yellow card) 1'; Birzhan Habit (yellow card) 2'; Batyr Kudaiberdinov 5'; Miras Turlybek 78', 88' (pen.); Aykhan Erzhanov (yellow card) 90+2'; Aydin Bralin (yellow card) 90+3'	Stadium: Shakhter Stadium; Attendance: 0 Referee: Anton Kuchma
Note: Match played behind closed doors due to the COVID-19 pandemic in Kazakhstan.

22 April 2021	Okzhetpes	3 – 1	Jenis	Kokshetau
15:00 (UTC+6)	Bolov 12'; Moldakaraev 28' (pen.); Sanat Zhumakhanov (yellow card) 34'; Ablaykhan Makhambetov 74'; Sarsenov (yellow card) 79'	Report	Adilzhan Dyusembaev (yellow card) 27'; Daniyar Plotnikov (yellow card) 55'; Ihtiyar Abdurahmanov 71'	Stadium: Okzhetpes Stadium; Attendance: 0 Referee: Almaz Akhmetov
Note: Match played behind closed doors due to the COVID-19 pandemic in Kazakhstan.

22 April 2021	Igilik	2 – 3	SDYuShOR 8	Karatau
16:00 (UTC+6)	Viktor Zyabko (yellow card) 15'; Sergey Klyakhin (yellow card) 30'; Diaz Sabyrov 45'; Zhazylbek Abdibaitov 90+4'	Report	Artur Dadakhanov 39'; Elmar Nabiev 42', 81'; Khamit Mataev (yellow card) 78'; Saken Onlasyn (yellow card) 84'	Stadium: Central Stadium; Attendance: 0 Referee: Elvira Nurmustafina
Note: Match played behind closed doors due to the COVID-19 pandemic in Kazakhstan.

== Second round ==
1 May 2021	SDYuShOR 8	3 – 0	Altai Semey	Nur-Sultan
14:00 (UTC+6)	Karim Smykov 10'; Elmar Nabiev 53', 90+1' (pen.)	Report	Islam Mukhametzhanov (yellow card) 49'; Erlan Akyltayuly (yellow card) 90'	Stadium: Astana Arena; Attendance: 0 Referee: Danil Gorda
Note: Match played behind closed doors due to the COVID-19 pandemic in Kazakhstan.

1 May 2021	Yassy-Turkestan	0 – 1	Ontustik Academy	Turkistan
15:00 (UTC+6)	Kuandyk Ilimov (yellow card) 45'; Dilmurod Pachchakhanov (yellow card) 82'	Report	Syrbai Maulen (yellow card) 31'; Vadim Afanasenko (yellow card) 44'; Alibi Tuzakbaev (yellow card) 74'; Javlanbek Babanazarov (yellow card) 81'; Samat Bortai 90'; Ramazan Abylaikhan (yellow card) 90+1'	Stadium: Zarylkapova Stadium; Attendance: 800; Referee: Maxim Bogdanov
Note: Match played behind closed doors due to the COVID-19 pandemic in Kazakhstan.

1 May 2021	Aksu	2 – 1	Kyran	Pavlodar
16:00 (UTC+6)	Nurbol Anuarbekov 30'; Birzhan Habit (yellow card) 41' (yellow-red card) 76'; Aikhan Yerzhanov 57'; Darkhan Abishev (yellow card) 62'	Report	Daniel Maulenov (yellow card) 39'; Danabek Kuanyshbai 66'	Stadium: Central Stadium; Attendance: 0 Referee: Galymzhan Kenzhalinov
Note: Match played behind closed doors due to the COVID-19 pandemic in Kazakhstan.

1 May 2021	Makhtaaral	2 – 1 (a.e.t.)	Okzhetpes	Atakent
16:00 (UTC+6)	Iskandar Kholmurzaev 45+3' (pen.); Valery Stepanenko (yellow card) 45+3'; Dramane Koné (yellow card) 70'; Rashid Liuhai 108'; Vyacheslav Serdyukov (yellow card) 112'	Report	Ablaykhan Makhambetov 7'; Niyaz Idrisov (yellow card) 45+2'; Timur Archakov (yellow card) 120'	Stadium: Central Stadium; Attendance: 600; Referee: Elvira Nurmustafina
Note: Match played behind closed doors due to the COVID-19 pandemic in Kazakhstan.

== Third round ==
22 May 2021	SDYuShOR 8	1 – 0	Ontustik Academy	Nur-Sultan
15:00 (UTC+6)	Artem Sherstov 19'; Onlasyn Saken (yellow card) 21'; Elmar Nabiev (yellow card) 66'	Report	Argen Manekeyev (yellow card) 21'; Abylaykhan Duysen (yellow card) 24' (yellow-red card) FT; Daniyar Abilov (yellow card) 52'; Alibi Tuzakbaev (yellow card) 63'	Stadium: Astana Arena; Attendance: 0 Referee: Almaz Akhmetov
Note: Match played behind closed doors due to the COVID-19 pandemic in Kazakhstan.

22 May 2021	Makhtaaral	1 – 0	Aksu	Atakent
17:00 (UTC+6)	Andrey Shabaev (yellow card) 25'; Dramane Koné 29'; Erbolat Rustemov (yellow card) 67'	Report	Vadim Yakovlev (yellow card) 13'; Izat Kulzhanov (yellow card) 50'; Valery Lenkov (yellow card) 83'	Stadium: Central Stadium; Attendance: 700; Referee: Sayat Karabaev

== Group stages ==
=== Group A ===
Pos	Team	Pld	W	D	L	GF	GA	GD	Pts	Qualification
1	Shakhter Karagandy (A)	6	4	0	2	18	14	+4	12	Advanced to Quarterfinals
2	Kyzylzhar (A)	6	3	2	1	16	8	+8	11	Advanced to Quarterfinals
3	Ordabasy	6	3	1	2	14	7	+7	10	
4	SDYuShOR 8	6	0	1	5	6	25	−19	1	

Updated to match(es) played on 18 August 2021. Source: PFLK
(A) Advance to a further round

10 July 2021 1	Kyzylzhar	1 – 1	SDYuShOR 8	Petropavl
18:00 (UTC+6)	Tuleyev Altynbek (yellow card) 64'; Saken Onlasyn 79'	Report	Mergazy Narbi 61'; Mataev Khamit (yellow card) 90'	Stadium: Karasai Stadium; Attendance: 800; Referee: Danil Gorda

11 July 2021 1	Ordabasy	1 – 0	Shakhter Karagandy	Shymkent
21:00 (UTC+6)	Diakate 90' (pen.)	Report	Ivan Sviridov (yellow card) 52'; Egor Alishauskas (yellow card) 84'; Chochiyev (yellow card) 88'	Stadium: Kazhymukan Munaitpasov Stadium; Attendance: 1,000; Referee: Anton Kuchma

16 July 2021 2	Shakhter Karagandy	3 – 2	Kyzylzhar	Karaganda
19:00 (UTC+6)	David Atanaskoski (yellow card) 65' (goal) 89'; Graf (yellow card) 69'; Tattybaev (yellow card) 73' (goal) 75', 86'; Shatskiy (yellow card) 90+5'	Report	Bushman 49'; Smajlagić 67'; Karshakevich (red card) 72'; Dmitry Shmidt (yellow card) 83'	Stadium: Shakhter Stadium; Attendance: 0 Referee: Grigory Moskovchenko
Note: Match played behind closed doors due to the COVID-19 pandemic in Kazakhstan.

18 July 2021 2	SDYuShOR 8	1 – 3	Ordabasy	Nur-Sultan
19:00 (UTC+6)	Oraz Saylybayev (yellow card) 25'; Artur Dadakhanov (yellow card) 54'; Elmar Nabiev 77' (pen.)	Report	Astanov 6', 28'; Khizhnichenko 64'	Stadium: Astana Arena; Attendance: 0 Referee: Maxim Bogdanov
Note: Match played behind closed doors due to the COVID-19 pandemic in Kazakhstan. Match played at the Astana Arena in Nur-Sultan instead of regular BIIK Stadium in Shymkent.

24 July 2021 3	Kyzylzhar	1 – 1	Ordabasy	Petropavl
18:00 (UTC+6)	Zorić 43'; Fonseca (yellow card) 59'	Report	Astanov 17'; Kleshchenko (yellow card) 45'; E.Astanov (yellow card) 83'	Stadium: Karasai Stadium; Attendance: 1,000; Referee: Bulat Sariev

25 July 2021 3	Shakhter Karagandy	7 – 1	SDYuShOR 8	Karaganda
19:00 (UTC+6)	Omirtayev 16', 42' (yellow card) 36'; Tattybaev 19', 55'; Buyvolov (yellow card) 45+2'; Zhan-Ali Payruz 46', 59'; Shikavka 62'; Gabyshev (yellow card) 66'	Report	Onlasyn Saken (yellow card) 48'; Nuraly Abish (yellow card) 72'; Karim Smykov 83'; Ilya Demin (yellow card) 90+1'	Stadium: Shakhter Stadium; Attendance: 0 Referee: Saken Bayimbet
Note: Match played behind closed doors due to the COVID-19 pandemic in Kazakhstan.

1 August 2021 4	Ordabasy	0 – 1	Kyzylzhar	Shymkent
21:00 (UTC+6)	Bekkhan Shayzada (red card) 2'; Osuchukwu (yellow card) 39'; Zhavlanbek Babanazarov (yellow card) 82'; Diakate (yellow card) 87'	Report	Bushman (yellow card) 39' (goal) 75'; Koné (yellow card) 56'; Timur Muldinov (yellow card) 80'	Stadium: Kazhymukan Munaitpasov Stadium; Attendance: 0 Referee: Igor Chesnokov
Note: Match played behind closed doors due to the COVID-19 pandemic in Kazakhstan.

1 August 2021 4	SDYuShOR 8	0 – 4	Shakhter Karagandy	Nur-Sultan
21:00 (UTC+6)	Onlasyn Saken (yellow card) 36'; Abilkair Ismailov (yellow card) 83'	Report	Tattybaev 32', 54' (pen.); Omirtayev 51'; Tair Nurseitov (yellow card) 62'; Yeskendir Kybyrai (yellow card) 76'; Umayev 84' (pen.)	Stadium: Astana Arena; Attendance: 0 Referee: Anton Moltusinov
Note: Match played behind closed doors due to the COVID-19 pandemic in Kazakhstan. Match played at the Astana Arena in Nur-Sultan instead of regular BIIK Stadium in Shymkent.

7 August 2021 5	SDYuShOR 8	2 – 3	Kyzylzhar	Shymkent
16:00 (UTC+6)	Artur Dadakhanov 50'; Oraz Saylybaev (yellow card) 81'; Arman Tolegenov 87'	Report	Alibek Kasym 15'; Vsevolod Koloda (yellow card) 32'; Altynbek Saparov (yellow card) 37'; Timur Muldinov 53' (yellow card) 81'; Maksim Skorykh 68'	Stadium: BIIK Stadium; Attendance: 700; Referee: Askar Bukenov

14 August 2021 5	Shakhter Karagandy	3 – 2	Ordabasy	Karaganda
19:00 (UTC+6)	Abylaikhan Nazimkhanov 12'; Tattybaev 38', 45'; Tair Nurseitov (yellow card) 40'; Umayev (yellow card) 90+2'; Mawutor (yellow card) 90+3'	Report	Asludin Khadzhiev (yellow card) 25'; Simčević 56' (yellow card) 90+3'; Sagadat Tursynbay (yellow card) 68'; Graf 90' (o.g.)	Stadium: Shakhter Stadium; Attendance: 0 Referee: Alexander Zatula
Note: Match played behind closed doors due to the COVID-19 pandemic in Kazakhstan.

17 August 2021 6	Kyzylzhar	8 – 1	Shakhter Karagandy	Petropavl
17:00 (UTC+6)	Bogdan Savkiv 19' (o.g.); Smajlagić 33', 63'; Dmitry Shmidt 48'; Zorić 54'; Almas Izmailov 67', 72'; Artem Cheredinov 87'	Report	Konstantin Gorizanov (yellow card) 9'; Ruslan Tutkyshev 44'	Stadium: Karasai Stadium; Attendance: 1,000; Referee: Sayat Karabaev

18 August 2021 6	Ordabasy	7 – 1	SDYuShOR 8	Shymkent
20:00 (UTC+6)	Kanat Ashirbay 3'; Sagadat Tursynbay (yellow card) 47' (goal) 55'; Batyrkhan Tazhibay 58'; Khizhnichenko 62'; Asludin Hadzhiev 73'; Maksim Vaganov 77'; Erik Zharylkasyn 85'	Report	Abilkaiyr Ismailov (yellow card) 50'; Altynbek Tuleev 82'	Stadium: Kazhymukan Munaitpasov Stadium; Attendance: 0 Referee: Anton Moltusinov
Note: Match played behind closed doors due to the COVID-19 pandemic in Kazakhstan.

=== Group B ===
Pos	Team	Pld	W	D	L	GF	GA	GD	Pts	Qualification
1	Tobol (A)	6	4	0	2	13	11	+2	12	Advanced to Quarterfinals
2	Taraz (A)	6	3	1	2	8	8	0	10	Advanced to Quarterfinals
3	Makhtaaral	6	2	3	1	13	9	+4	9	
4	Atyrau	6	0	2	4	5	11	−6	2	

Updated to match(es) played on 15 August 2021. Source: PFLK
(A) Advance to a further round

10 July 2021 1	Taraz	1 – 3	Tobol	Taraz
20:00 (UTC+6)	Berik Aitbayev 14'; Baytana (yellow card) 67'; Abylayhan Zhumabek (yellow card) 90+4'	Report	Tošić 5', 32'; Kairov (yellow card) 78'; Jovančić (yellow card) 86'; Tagybergen 90+1'	Stadium: Central Stadium; Attendance: 2,500; Referee: Igor Chesnokov

11 July 2021 1	Atyrau	2 – 2	Makhtaaral	Atyrau
20:00 (UTC+6)	Gian 35' (pen.); Grzelczak 43'; Guz (yellow card) 90'	Report	Erbolat Rustemov 21', 29'; Vyacheslav Serdyukov (yellow card) 35'; Marlen Aymanov (yellow card) 45+2'; Rashid Liuhai (yellow card) 52'; Alexander Rushinas (yellow card) 90+3'	Stadium: Munaishy Stadium; Attendance: 800; Referee: Daniyar Kurbanov

16 July 2021 2	Tobol	2 – 0	Atyrau	Kostanay
21:00 (UTC+6)	Silva 42'; Tošić 90+1'	Report	Kuanysh Kalmuratov (yellow card) 24'; Dmitrenko (yellow card) 57' (yellow-red card) 69'; Medved (yellow card) 72'	Stadium: Central Stadium; Attendance: 1,600; Referee: Rustam Omarov

17 July 2021 2	Makhtaaral	1 – 2	Taraz	Atakent
18:00 (UTC+6)	Edïge Oralbai 16'; Andrey Shabaev (yellow card) 74'	Report	Maksat Amirkhanov (yellow card) 21'; Marlen Aymanov 28' (o.g.); Nenadović 41'	Stadium: Alpamys Batyr Stadium; Attendance: 850; Referee: Nikita Utrobin

24 July 2021 3	Atyrau	1 – 2	Taraz	Atyrau
20:00 (UTC+6)	Gian 30'; Guz (yellow card) 79'	Report	Dinmukhamed Karaman 43'; Baytana 59' (yellow card) 79'; Seysen (yellow card) 81'; Stojković (yellow card) 90+4'; Allef (yellow card) 90+5'	Stadium: Munaishy Stadium; Attendance: 0 Referee: Anton Kuchma
Note: Match played behind closed doors due to the COVID-19 pandemic in Kazakhstan.

25 July 2021 3	Tobol	3 – 4	Makhtaaral	Kostanay
21:00 (UTC+6)	Muzhikov 30'; Zhaslan Zhumashev (penalty missed) 68' 68' (yellow card) 78'; Dierjon Aripov 83' (o.g.)	Report	Vladimir Sedelnikov 8'; Edige Oralbai 11' (yellow card) 34'; Rashid Liuhai 17'; Erbolat Serik (yellow card) 64'; Evgeniy Levin (yellow card) 67'; Madi Hasein 90+1' (o.g.)	Stadium: Central Stadium; Attendance: 800; Referee: Galymzhan Kenzhalinov

30 July 2021 4	Taraz	1 – 0	Atyrau	Taraz
20:00 (UTC+6)	Nenadović 67'	Report	Dmitrenko (yellow card) 26'	Stadium: Central Stadium; Attendance: 2,200; Referee: Sergei Nozhenko

1 August 2021 4	Makhtaaral	4 – 0	Tobol	Atakent
18:00 (UTC+6)	Madi Khasein (yellow card) 29'; Dramane Koné 31'; Edige Oralbai (yellow card) 45+2' (goal) 87'; Beknur Ryskul (yellow card) 47'; Evgeniy Levin 51'; Sultanbek Duiseshov 90+1'	Report	Bekzat Zhaparov (yellow card) 20'; Rakhat Kabdullov (yellow card) 34'; Vyacheslav Kulpeisov (yellow card) 90'	Stadium: Alpamys Batyr Stadium; Attendance: 0 Referee: Denis Izmailov
Note: Match played behind closed doors due to the COVID-19 pandemic in Kazakhstan.

7 August 2021 5	Makhtaaral	1 – 1	Atyrau	Atakent
18:00 (UTC+6)	Erbolat Rustemov 5'; Dierjon Aripov (yellow card) 76'; Meyrambek Serikbai (yellow card) 90+2'	Report	Guz 38'; Bryan (yellow card) 50'; Grzelczak 88'; Sabit Tastanbekov (yellow card) 90+5'	Stadium: Alpamys Batyr Stadium; Attendance: 500; Referee: Almaz Akhmetov

8 August 2021 5	Tobol	2 – 1	Taraz	Kostanay
19:00 (UTC+6)	Nurgaliyev (yellow card) 24'; Zharynbetov (yellow card) 42'; Manzorro (yellow card) 50'; Sergeyev 69'; Abilgazy (yellow card) 68' (goal) 90+3'	Report	Baytana 44'; Kódjo (yellow card) 53'; Abzal Taubay (yellow card) 86'	Stadium: Central Stadium; Attendance: 1,600; Referee: Aidyn Rakhimbaev

14 August 2021 6	Taraz	1 – 1	Makhtaaral	Taraz
20:00 (UTC+6)	Nenadović 33'; Obilor (yellow card) 63'	Report	Edïge Oralbai (yellow card) 55' (yellow-red card) FT; Rashid Liuhai 60'; Kambil Meyirzhan (yellow card) 90+5' (yellow-red card) 90+5'	Stadium: Central Stadium; Attendance: 0 Referee: Bolat Karlibaev
Note: Match played behind closed doors due to the COVID-19 pandemic in Kazakhstan.

15 August 2021 6	Atyrau	1 – 3	Tobol	Atyrau
20:00 (UTC+6)	Allef 8'; Dashyan (yellow card) 17'; Udo (red card) 31'; Alex Bruno (yellow card) 32'; Stojković (yellow card) 52'; Medved (yellow card) 63'	Report	Sergeyev 58'; Muzhikov (yellow card) 62'; Manzorro 75'; Tošić 86'	Stadium: Munaishy Stadium; Attendance: 0 Referee: Daniyar Kurbanov
Note: Match played behind closed doors due to the COVID-19 pandemic in Kazakhstan.

=== Group C ===
Pos	Team	Pld	W	D	L	GF	GA	GD	Pts	Qualification
1	Astana (A)	6	3	2	1	6	6	0	11	Advanced to Quarterfinals
2	Kaisar (A)	6	3	2	1	6	2	+4	11	Advanced to Quarterfinals
3	Akzhayik	6	3	1	2	7	5	+2	10	
4	Aktobe	6	0	1	5	5	11	−6	1	

Updated to match(es) played on 15 August 2021. Source: PFLK
(A) Advance to a further round

10 July 2021 1	Kaisar	0 – 0	Astana	Kyzylorda
22:00 (UTC+6)	Bayzhanov (yellow card) 51'; Denković (yellow card) 57'; Bitang (yellow card) 77'	Report	Sultan Sagnaev (yellow card) 52'; Lev Skvortsov (yellow card) 90+2'	Stadium: Gani Muratbayev Stadium; Attendance: 0 Referee: Alexander Zatul
Note: Match played behind closed doors due to the COVID-19 pandemic in Kazakhstan.

11 July 2021 1	Aktobe	0 – 2	Akzhayik	Aktobe
19:00 (UTC+6)	Doumbia (yellow card) 58'; Žulpa (yellow card) 62'; Adilkhan Tanzharikov (yellow card) 68'; Sergeyev (penalty missed) 75'	Report	Kozlov (penalty missed) 40' 40', 77'; Ardak Saulet (yellow card) 59'; Sicaci (yellow card) 87'	Stadium: Central Stadium; Attendance: 2,200; Referee: Saken Bayimbet

16 July 2021 2	Astana	3 – 2	Aktobe	Nur-Sultan
19:00 (UTC+6)	Tomasov 13'; Adilkhan Tanzharikov 48' (o.g.); Ebong (yellow card) 57'; Beisebekov (yellow card) 63'; Barseghyan 71'	Report	Žulpa (yellow card) 29'; Adilkhan Tanzharikov (yellow card) 30'; Chernyshov 45'; Orazov (yellow card) 53'; Dinmukhamed Kashken (yellow card) 73'; Logvinenko 80'; Alisher Azhimov (yellow card) 90'	Stadium: Astana Arena; Attendance: 2,000; Referee: Sergey Nozhenko

17 July 2021 2	Akzhayik	0 – 0	Kaisar	Oral
20:00 (UTC+6)	Kovtalyuk (yellow card) 82'	Report	Bitang (yellow card) 65'; N'Diaye (yellow card) 82'	Stadium: Petr Atoyan Stadium; Attendance: 1,600; Referee: Alexander Gauser

24 July 2021 3	Aktobe	1 – 2	Kaisar	Aktobe
21:00 (UTC+6)	Logvinenko (yellow card) 20'; Orazov (yellow card) 36'; Shomko (yellow card) 61'; Jeřábek (yellow card) 71' (goal) 90+6'	Report	Denković (penalty missed) 21' 84'; Čađenović (yellow card) 45'; Potapov 69'; Narzildayev (yellow card) 73'	Stadium: Central Stadium; Attendance: 2,485; Referee: Sayat Karabayev

25 July 2021 3	Astana	1 – 0	Akzhayik	Nur-Sultan
21:00 (UTC+6)	Aymbetov 42'; Cadete (yellow card) 52'; Tomašević (yellow card) 61'; Sultan Sagnayev (yellow card) 73'; Gurman (yellow card) 86' (yellow-red card) 90+4'	Report	Ivan Antipov (yellow card) 7'; Kovtalyuk (yellow card) 20'; Eldar Abdrakhmanov (yellow card) 75'	Stadium: Astana Arena; Attendance: 0 Referee: Aydin Rakhimbaev
Note: Match played behind closed doors due to the COVID-19 pandemic in Kazakhstan.

31 July 2021 4	Kaisar	1 – 0	Aktobe	Kyzylorda
22:00 (UTC+6)	Bayzhanov (yellow card) 17'; Narzildayev (yellow card) 36'; Laukžemis 46'	Report		Stadium: Gani Muratbayev Stadium; Attendance: 1,200; Referee: Mikhail Bildinov

1 August 2021 4	Akzhayik	3 – 0	Astana	Oral
19:00 (UTC+6)	Gashchenkov 34'; Luka Imnadze 52'; Kozlov 58'	Report		Stadium: Petr Atoyan Stadium; Attendance: 1,600; Referee: Alexander Gauser

7 August 2021 5	Akzhayik	2 – 1	Aktobe	Oral
19:00 (UTC+6)	Kovtalyuk 3' (yellow card) 43'; Gashchenkov (yellow card) 41'; Ivan Antipov 53' (yellow card) 79'	Report	Logvinenko (yellow card) 43'; Jeřábek (yellow card) 61'; Yerlanov 78'; Adilkhan Tanzharikov (yellow card) 80'	Stadium: Petr Atoyan Stadium; Attendance: 1,500; Referee: Nikita Utrobin

8 August 2021 5	Astana	1 – 0	Kaisar	Nur-Sultan
21:00 (UTC+6)	Barseghyan 2'; Ebong (yellow card) 53'; Beysebekov (yellow card) 85'	Report	Denković (yellow card) 55'; N'Diaye (yellow card) 59'; Bekzat Shadmanov (yellow card) 60'	Stadium: Astana Arena; Attendance: 0 Referee: Denis Izmailov
Note: Match played behind closed doors due to the COVID-19 pandemic in Kazakhstan.

14 August 2021 6	Kaisar	3 – 0	Akzhayik	Kyzylorda
21:00 (UTC+6)	Kenesov 25'; Elzhas Altynbekov 38'; Ilyas Amirseitov (yellow card) 67'; Bitang 85' (pen.)	Report	Gashchenkov (yellow card) 50'; Bauyrzhan Omarov (yellow card) 65'; Vladimir Pokatilov (yellow card) 84'	Stadium: Gani Muratbayev Stadium; Attendance: 1,400; Referee: Sergey Nozhenko

15 August 2021 6	Aktobe	1 – 1	Astana	Aktobe
18:00 (UTC+6)	Samorodov 15' (yellow card) 19'; Orazov (yellow card) 25'; Adilkhan Tanzharikov (yellow card) 25'; Chernyshov (yellow card) 52'	Report	Ciupercă (yellow card) 13'; Tomasov 85'	Stadium: Central Stadium; Attendance: 0 Referee: Sergey Gorokhovodatsky
Note: Match played behind closed doors due to the COVID-19 pandemic in Kazakhstan.

=== Group D ===
Pos	Team	Pld	W	D	L	GF	GA	GD	Pts	Qualification
1	Caspiy (A)	6	4	1	1	10	4	+6	13	Advanced to Quarterfinals
2	Kairat (A)	6	3	0	3	11	9	+2	9	Advanced to Quarterfinals
3	Zhetysu	6	2	1	3	3	5	−2	7	
4	Turan	6	2	0	4	5	11	−6	6	

Updated to match(es) played on 15 August 2021. Source: PFLK
(A) Advance to a further round

10 July 2021 1	Zhetysu	0 – 1	Kairat	Taldıqorğan
18:00 (UTC+6)	Ablitarov (yellow card) 51'	Report	Andrey Ulshin 10'; Arsen Buranchiev (yellow card) 25'; Alykulov (yellow card) 71'; Sergey Keiler (yellow card) 90+5'	Stadium: Zhetysu Stadium; Attendance: 0 Referee: Nariman Talapkerov
Note: Match played behind closed doors due to the COVID-19 pandemic in Kazakhstan.

11 July 2021 1	Caspiy	4 – 0	Turan	Aktau
20:00 (UTC+6)	Bondarenko (yellow card) 6'; Mingazow 26', 34'; Karimov 42'; Bekzat Kabylan 80'; Wajdi Sahli (yellow card) 90+1'	Report	Stojanović (yellow card) 31'; Nurgaini Buribayev (yellow card) 83'; Adams (yellow card) 89'	Stadium: Zhastar Stadium; Attendance: 0 Referee: Sayat Karabaev
Note: Match played behind closed doors due to the COVID-19 pandemic in Kazakhstan.

17 July 2021 2	Kairat	0 – 2	Caspiy	Almaty
19:00 (UTC+6)	Seydakhmet (yellow card) 30'; Ustimenko (red card) 32'; Sergey Keiler (yellow card) 65'; Arsen Buranchiev (yellow card) 73'	Report	Cuckić 39' (yellow card) 58'; Talgat Kusyapov (yellow card) 43'; Zaleski 54'; Tigroudja (yellow card) 82'; Miras Tuliev (yellow card) 90+2'	Stadium: Central Stadium; Attendance: 1,500; Referee: Denis Izmailov

18 July 2021 2	Turan	0 – 2	Zhetysu	Turkistan
21:00 (UTC+6)	Stanley (yellow card) 52'; Temirlan Amirov (yellow card) 80'	Report	Dmitrijev 8'; Kalpachuk (yellow card) 32'; Nurbol Nurbergen (yellow card) 75'; Dias Kalybaev (yellow card) 81'; Aslan Adil 90+3'	Stadium: Turkistan Arena; Attendance: 1,400; Referee: Sergey Gorokhovodatsky

24 July 2021 3	Kairat	0 – 1	Turan	Almaty
19:00 (UTC+6)	Andrey Ulshin (yellow card) 24'; Seydakhmet (yellow card) 34'	Report	Chizh (yellow card) 38'; Stanley 68'; Zaleski (yellow card) 90+5'	Stadium: Central Stadium; Attendance: 1,5000; Referee: Danil Gorda

25 July 2021 3	Caspiy	1 – 0	Zhetysu	Aktau
20:00 (UTC+6)	Cuckić (yellow card) 44'; Wajdi Sahli 76'; Ruslan Zhanysbaev (yellow card) 90+1'	Report	Askhat Baltabekov (yellow card) 49'; Kalpachuk (yellow card) 52'	Stadium: Zhastar Stadium; Attendance: 0 Referee: Alexander Zatula
Note: Match played behind closed doors due to the COVID-19 pandemic in Kazakhstan.

31 July 2021 4	Turan	4 – 3	Kairat	Turkistan
20:00 (UTC+6)	Arsen Buranchiev (yellow card) 6'; Artur Shushenachev 12'; Alykulov 14'; Andrey Ulshin 19'; Miras Omatay (yellow card) 83'	Report	Mardan Tolebek (yellow card) 41' (goal) 53'; Dinmukhammed Omarov 57'; Stanley 66', 86'; Musabekov (yellow card) 71'	Stadium: Turkistan Arena; Attendance: 0 Referee: Elvira Nurmustafina
Note: Match played behind closed doors due to the COVID-19 pandemic in Kazakhstan.

1 August 2021 4	Zhetysu	0 – 0	Caspiy	Taldıqorğan
18:00 (UTC+6)	Enache (penalty missed) 57'	Report	Nurlybek Ayazbaev (yellow card) 56'	Stadium: Zhetysu Stadium; Attendance: 0 Referee: Bolat Karlibaev
Note: Match played behind closed doors due to the COVID-19 pandemic in Kazakhstan.

8 August 2021 5	Kairat	3 – 0	Zhetysu	Almaty
19:00 (UTC+6)	Artur Shushenachev 4', 18' (yellow card) 38'; Dugalić 61'	Report		Stadium: Central Stadium; Attendance: 0 Referee: Bulat Sariev
Note: Match played behind closed doors due to the COVID-19 pandemic in Kazakhstan.

8 August 2021 5	Turan	0 – 1	Caspiy	Turkistan
21:00 (UTC+6)	Gafurzhan Nazarov (yellow card) 80'	Report	Talgat Kusyapov 28'; Maksat Taykenov (yellow card) 80'	Stadium: Turkistan Arena; Attendance: 0 Referee: Artem Kuchin
Note: Match played behind closed doors due to the COVID-19 pandemic in Kazakhstan.

14 August 2021 6	Zhetysu	1 – 0	Turan	Taldıqorğan
18:00 (UTC+6)	Aleksey Mikhaylov 8'; Askhat Baltabekov (yellow card) 44'; Ravil Atykhanov (yellow card) 47'	Report	Zaleski (yellow card) 79'	Stadium: Zhetysu Stadium; Attendance: 0 Referee: Alexander Gauser
Note: Match played behind closed doors due to the COVID-19 pandemic in Kazakhstan.

15 August 2021 6	Caspiy	2 – 4	Kairat	Aktau
20:00 (UTC+6)	Tigroudja 41' (yellow card) 54'; Karimov 45+1'; Amandyk Nabikhanov (yellow card) 45+3'; Zaleski (yellow card) 68'; Mingazow (yellow card) 74'	Report	Dugalić 6', 34' (yellow card) 23'; Abiken 9'; Kanté 44'; Hovhannisyan (yellow card) 45+3'; Arsen Buranchiev (yellow card) 90+2'	Stadium: Zhastar Stadium; Attendance: 0 Referee: Maxim Bogdanov
Note: Match played behind closed doors due to the COVID-19 pandemic in Kazakhstan.

== Quarterfinals ==
21 August 2021 1st leg	Kyzylzhar	0 – 1	Tobol	Petropavl
17:00 (UTC+6)	Fonseca (yellow card) 16' (yellow-red card) 65'; Alibek Kasym (yellow card) 28'; Dmitry Shmidt (yellow card) 44'; Murachyov (yellow card) 62'	Report	Sergeyev 36'; Marochkin (yellow card) 49'	Stadium: Karasai Stadium; Attendance: 1,600; Referee: Aidyn Rakhimbaev

22 September 2021 2nd leg	Tobol	1 – 0 (2 – 0 agg.)	Kyzylzhar	Kostanay
20:00 (UTC+6)	Asrankulov 61'	Report	Altynbek Saparov (yellow card) 23'; Murachyov (yellow card) 63'; Podio (yellow card) 89'	Stadium: Central Stadium; Attendance: 500; Referee: Grigory Moskovchenko

21 August 2021 1st leg	Astana	3 – 3	Caspiy	Nur-Sultan
19:00 (UTC+6)	Ebong 4'; Kuat (yellow card) 17'; Aymbetov 36'; Tomašević (yellow card) 63' (goal) 84'; Šimunović (yellow card) 80'; Barseghyan (yellow card) 80'; Cadete (yellow card) 90+4'	Report	Darabayev (yellow card) 21' (goal) 90+5'; Maksat Taykenov 39' (pen.); Ruslan Zhanysbaev 45'; Jean-Ali Payruz (yellow card) 56'; Mingazow (yellow card) 80'	Stadium: Astana Arena; Attendance: 0 Referee: Denis Tevyashov
Note: Match played behind closed doors due to the COVID-19 pandemic in Kazakhstan.

22 September 2021 2nd leg	Caspiy	0 – 1 (a.e.t.) (3 – 4 agg.)	Astana	Aktau
18:00 (UTC+6)	Zaleski (red card) 2'; Talgat Kusyapov (yellow card) 33'; Taykenov (yellow card) 68'; Gavrić (yellow card) 88'; Nurlybek Ayazbaev (yellow card) 120+1'	Report	Sultan Sagnayev (yellow card) 12'; Lev Skvortsov (yellow card) 36'; Beysebekov (yellow card) 51'; Ebong (yellow card) 62' (yellow-red card) 120'; Ciupercă (yellow card) 90' (yellow-red card) 106'; Kuat (yellow card) 90+4' (goal) 116'; Barseghyan (yellow card) 93'; Sagi Sovet (yellow card) 100'	Stadium: Zhastar Stadium; Attendance: 1,500; Referee: Saken Bayimbet

22 September 2021 1st leg	Kairat	3 – 0	Kaisar	Almaty
19:00 (UTC+6)	Alves (yellow card) 12' (goal) 90+3'; Vágner Love 40'; Kanté 74'	Report	Kenesov (yellow card) 73'	Stadium: Central Stadium; Attendance: 1,000; Referee: Denis Izmailov

27 October 2021 2nd leg	Kaisar	0 – 2 (0 – 5 agg.)	Kairat	Kyzylorda
19:00 (UTC+6)	Nurymzhan Salaidin (yellow card) 59'; Orken Makhan (yellow card) 72'; Bimenyimana (yellow card) 83'	Report	Vorogovsky (yellow card) 38'; Vágner Love 76'; Shushenachev 88'	Stadium: Gani Muratbayev Stadium; Attendance: 1,500; Referee: Anton Kuchma

22 September 2021 1st leg	Taraz	0 – 0	Shakhter Karagandy	Taraz
19:00 (UTC+6)	Abzal Taubay (yellow card) 38'	Report	Khozin (yellow card) 76'; Bukorac (yellow card) 79'; Mawutor (yellow card) 85'	Stadium: Central Stadium; Attendance: 2,000; Referee: Bulat Sariev

27 October 2021 2nd leg	Shakhter Karagandy	3 – 1 (3 – 1 agg.)	Taraz	Karaganda
16:00 (UTC+6)	David Atanaskoski 26'; Toshev 59'; Rustemović (yellow card) 70'; Graf (yellow card) 75'; Tattybayev 90'	Report	Alisher Suley 39' (yellow card) 56'	Stadium: Shakhter Stadium; Attendance: 1,500; Referee: Grigory Moskovchenko

== Semifinals ==
The four winners from the quarterfinals were drawn into two two-legged ties.

7 November 2021 1st leg	Astana	0 – 3	Kairat	Nur-Sultan
18:00 (UTC+6)	Tomašević (yellow card) 35'; Bećiraj (yellow card) 56'; Aldair Adilov (yellow card) 90+3'; Prokopenko (yellow card) 90+4'	Report	Dugalić 45+7'; Kanté 67'; Shushenachev 71'; Abiken (yellow card) 85'	Stadium: Astana Arena; Attendance: 3,000; Referee: Alexander Gauser

20 November 2021 2nd leg	Kairat	3 – 0 (6 – 0 agg.)	Astana	Almaty
15:00 (UTC+6)	Dugalić (yellow card) 22' (yellow-red card) 58'; Meyrambek Kalmyrza 64' (o.g.); Kanté 80'; Vágner Love 86'	Report	Sultan Sagnayev (yellow card) 39'; Bećiraj (yellow card) 41'; Kuat (yellow card) 56'; Meyrambek Kalmyrza (yellow card) 61' (red card) 69'; Bitri (yellow card) 64'	Stadium: Central Stadium; Attendance: 2,000; Referee: Artem Kuchin

6 November 2021 1st leg	Shakhter Karagandy	5 – 2	Tobol	Nur-Sultan
15:00 (UTC+6)	Umayev 8', 45+1'; David Atanaskoski 14'; Mawutor 48'; Bukorac (yellow card) 83'; Tattybayev 88'; Shikavka (yellow card) 90'	Report	Tagybergen 45'; Jovančić (yellow card) 45+3'; Sergeyev 58'; Zharynbetov (yellow card) 73'; Zhaslan Zhumashev (yellow card) 85'; Malyi (yellow card) 86'	Stadium: Astana Arena; Attendance: 600; Referee: Igor Chesnokov
Note: Match played at the Astana Arena in Nur-Sultan, instead of Shakhter Karagandy's regular Shakhter Stadium in Karaganda.

21 November 2021 2nd leg	Tobol	0 – 2 (2 – 7 agg.)	Shakhter Karagandy	Kostanay
16:00 (UTC+6)	Manzorro (yellow card) 63'	Report	Nazarenko 35'; Toshev 39'	Stadium: Central Stadium; Attendance: 650; Referee: Daniyar Sakhi

== Final ==
28 November 2021 Final	Kairat	3 – 3 (9 – 8 p)	Shakhter Karagandy	Nur-Sultan
20:30 (UTC+6)	Vágner Love 6', 40'; Kanté (yellow card) 107'; Shushenachev 110'	Report	Gabyshev 48'; Bukorac (yellow card) 69'; Toshev 75'; Mawutor (yellow card) 82'; Y.Kybyrai (yellow card) 93'; Tattybayev 97' (pen.); Umayev (yellow card) 103'	Stadium: Astana Arena; Attendance: 4,000; Referee: Igor Chesnokov
	Penalties
	Abiken (penalty scored); Alykulov (penalty scored); Alves (penalty scored); Góralski (penalty scored); Alip (penalty missed); Shushenachev (penalty scored); Vorogovsky (penalty scored); Bagnack (penalty scored); Palyakow (penalty scored); Hovhannisyan (penalty scored)		(penalty scored) Graf; (penalty scored) Mawutor; (penalty missed) Y.Kybyrai; (penalty scored) Umayev; (penalty scored) Tattybayev; (penalty scored) Lamanje; (penalty scored) Najaryan; (penalty scored) Khozin; (penalty scored) Shatsky; (penalty missed) Nazimkhanov

== Goal scorers ==
As of match played 28 November 2021

11 goals:

- (Kazakhstan) Aydos Tattybayev - Shakhter Karagandy

6 goals:

- (Kazakhstan) Artur Shushenachev - Kairat

5 goals:

- (Kazakhstan) Elmar Nabiev - SDYuShOR 8
- (Brazil) Vágner Love - Kairat

4 goals:

- (Guinea) José Kanté - Kairat
- (Serbia) Rade Dugalić - Kairat
- (Serbia) Zoran Tošić - Tobol
- (Uzbekistan) Igor Sergeyev - Tobol

3 goals:

- (Russia) Yevgeni Kozlov - Akzhayik
- (Kazakhstan) Amal Seitov - Kyran
- (Bosnia and Herzegovina) Semir Smajlagić - Kyzylzhar
- (Kazakhstan) Rashid Liuhai - Makhtaaral
- (Kazakhstan) Edïge Oralbai - Makhtaaral
- (Kazakhstan) Erbolat Rustemov - Makhtaaral
- (Kazakhstan) Sultanbek Astanov - Ordabasy
- (Bulgaria) Martin Toshev - Shakhter Karagandy
- (Kazakhstan) Oralkhan Omirtayev - Shakhter Karagandy
- (North Macedonia) David Atanaskoski - Shakhter Karagandy
- (Russia) Idris Umayev - Shakhter Karagandy
- (Serbia) Uroš Nenadović - Taraz
- (Nigeria) Stanley - Turan

2 goals:

- (Kazakhstan) Miras Turlybek - Aksu
- (Armenia) Tigran Barseghyan - Astana
- (Croatia) Marin Tomasov - Astana
- (Kazakhstan) Abat Aymbetov - Astana
- (Brazil) Gian - Atyrau
- (Kazakhstan) Ramazan Karimov - Caspiy
- (Turkmenistan) Ruslan Mingazow - Caspiy
- (Kazakhstan) Matvey Matvienko - Ekibastuz
- (Kazakhstan) Andrey Ulshin - Kairat
- (Kazakhstan) Baglan Boribay - Kyran
- (Kazakhstan) Danabek Kuanyshbay - Kyran
- (Kazakhstan) Almas Izmailov - Kyzylzhar
- (Montenegro) Darko Zorić - Kyzylzhar
- (Ukraine) Yuriy Bushman - Kyzylzhar
- (Ivory Coast) Dramane Koné - Makhtaaral
- (Kazakhstan) Arman Tolegenov - Makhtaaral/SDYuShOR 8
- (Kazakhstan) Ablaykhan Makhambetov - Okzhetpes
- (Kazakhstan) Sergey Khizhnichenko - Ordabasy
- (Kazakhstan) Artur Dadakhanov - SDYuShOR 8
- (Kazakhstan) Karim Smykov - SDYuShOR 8
- (Kazakhstan) Zhan-Ali Payruz - Shakhter Karagandy
- (Kazakhstan) Bauyrzhan Baytana - Taraz
- (Kazakhstan) Askhat Tagybergen - Tobol

1 goals:

- (Kazakhstan) Nurbol Anuarbekov - Aksu
- (Kazakhstan) Batyr Kudaiberdinov - Aksu
- (Kazakhstan) Aikhan Yerzhanov - Aksu
- (Czech Republic) Michal Jeřábek - Aktobe
- (Kazakhstan) Yury Logvinenko - Aktobe
- (Kazakhstan) Maksim Samorodov - Aktobe
- (Kazakhstan) Temirlan Yerlanov - Aktobe
- (Russia) Oleg Chernyshov - Aktobe
- (Georgia (country)) Luka Imnadze - Akzhayik
- (Kazakhstan) Ivan Antipov - Akzhayik
- (Russia) Mikhail Gashchenkov - Akzhayik
- (Ukraine) Mykola Kovtalyuk - Akzhayik
- (Belarus) Max Ebong - Astana
- (Kazakhstan) Islambek Kuat - Astana
- (Montenegro) Žarko Tomašević - Astana
- (Brazil) Allef - Atyrau
- (Poland) Piotr Grzelczak - Atyrau
- (Russia) Dmitry Guz - Atyrau
- (Belarus) Aleksey Zaleski - Caspiy
- (France) Chafik Tigroudja - Caspiy
- (Kazakhstan) Aslan Darabayev - Caspiy
- (Kazakhstan) Bekzat Kabylan - Caspiy
- (Kazakhstan) Talgat Kusyapov - Caspiy
- (Kazakhstan) Maksat Taykenov - Caspiy
- (Kazakhstan) Ruslan Zhanysbaev - Caspiy
- (Serbia) Nikola Cuckić - Caspiy
- (Tunisia) Wajdi Sahli - Caspiy
- (Kazakhstan) Sayat Zhumagali - Ekibastuz
- (Kazakhstan) Zhazylbek Abdibaitov - Igilik
- (Kazakhstan) Diaz Sabyrov - Igilik
- (Kazakhstan) Ihtiyar Abdurahmanov - Jenis
- (Kazakhstan) Aybol Abiken - Kairat
- (Kyrgyzstan) Gulzhigit Alykulov - Kairat
- (Portugal) Ricardo Alves - Kairat
- (Cameroon) Clarence Bitang - Kaisar
- (Kazakhstan) Elzhas Altynbekov - Kaisar
- (Kazakhstan) Arman Kenesov - Kaisar
- (Lithuania) Karolis Laukžemis - Kaisar
- (Montenegro) Stefan Denković - Kaisar
- (Russia) Yegor Potapov - Kaisar
- (Kazakhstan) Serikzhan Abzhal - Kyran
- (Kazakhstan) Bekzat Zhaksybayuly - Kyran
- (Kazakhstan) Zhanserik Kaldybay - Kyran
- (Kazakhstan) Artem Cheredinov - Kyzylzhar
- (Kazakhstan) Alibek Kasym - Kyzylzhar
- (Kazakhstan) Timur Muldinov - Kyzylzhar
- (Kazakhstan) Saken Onlasyn - Kyzylzhar
- (Kazakhstan) Dmitry Shmidt - Kyzylzhar
- (Kazakhstan) Maksim Skorykh - Kyzylzhar
- (Kazakhstan) Dierjon Aripov - Makhtaaral
- (Kazakhstan) Sultanbek Duiseshov - Makhtaaral
- (Kazakhstan) Evgeniy Levin - Makhtaaral
- (Kazakhstan) Vladimir Sedelnikov - Makhtaaral
- (Uzbekistan) Iskandar Kholmurzaev - Makhtaaral
- (Russia) Ruslan Bolov - Okzhetpes
- (Kazakhstan) Zhasulan Moldakaraev - Okzhetpes
- (Kazakhstan) Kanat Ashirbay - Ordabasy
- (Kazakhstan) Asludin Hadzhiev - Ordabasy
- (Kazakhstan) Batyrkhan Tazhibay - Ordabasy
- (Kazakhstan) Sagadat Tursynbay - Ordabasy
- (Kazakhstan) Maksim Vaganov - Ordabasy
- (Kazakhstan) Erik Zharylkasyn - Ordabasy
- (Senegal) Abdoulaye Diakate - Ordabasy
- (Serbia) Aleksandar Simčević - Ordabasy
- (Kazakhstan) Samat Bortai - Ontustik Academy
- (Kazakhstan) Salauat Gabdulakhmet - Ruzayevka
- (Kazakhstan) Mergazy Narbi - SDYuShOR 8
- (Kazakhstan) Artem Sherstov - SDYuShOR 8
- (Kazakhstan) Altynbek Tuleev - SDYuShOR 8
- (Belarus) Pavel Nazarenko - Shakhter Karagandy
- (Belarus) Yevgeniy Shikavka - Shakhter Karagandy
- (Ghana) David Mawutor - Shakhter Karagandy
- (Kazakhstan) Mikhail Gabyshev - Shakhter Karagandy
- (Kazakhstan) Abylaikhan Nazimkhanov - Shakhter Karagandy
- (Kazakhstan) Ruslan Tutkyshev - Shakhter Karagandy
- (Kazakhstan) Berik Aitbayev - Taraz
- (Kazakhstan) Dinmukhamed Karaman - Taraz
- (Kazakhstan) Alisher Suley - Taraz
- (France) Jérémy Manzorro - Tobol
- (Guinea-Bissau) Toni Silva - Tobol
- (Kazakhstan) Sultan Abilgazy - Tobol
- (Kazakhstan) Roman Asrankulov - Tobol
- (Kazakhstan) Serikzhan Muzhikov - Tobol
- (Kazakhstan) Zhaslan Zhumashev - Tobol
- (Kazakhstan) Dinmukhammed Omarov - Turan
- (Kazakhstan) Mardan Tolebek - Turan
- (Kazakhstan) Kuandyk Ilimov - Yassy-Turkestan
- (Kazakhstan) Zhenis Abuov - Yassy-Turkestan
- (Estonia) Artjom Dmitrijev - Zhetysu
- (Kazakhstan) Aslan Adil - Zhetysu
- (Kazakhstan) Aleksey Mikhaylov - Zhetysu

Own goal

- (Kazakhstan) Khayam Ahmedov - Ruzayevka vs Yassy-Turkestan 22 April 2021
- (Kazakhstan) Adilkhan Tanzharikov - Aktobe vs Astana 16 July 2021
- (Kazakhstan) Marlen Aymanov - Taraz vs Makhtaaral 17 July 2021
- (Kazakhstan) Dierjon Aripov - Makhtaaral vs Tobol 25 July 2021
- (Kazakhstan) Madi Hasein - Tobol vs Makhtaaral 25 July 2021
- (Croatia) Ivan Graf - Shakhter Karagandy vs Ordabasy 14 August 2021
- (Kazakhstan) Bogdan Savkiv - Shakhter Karagandy vs Kyzylzhar 17 August 2021
- (Kazakhstan) Meyrambek Kalmyrza - Astana vs Kairat 20 November 2021
