= David Karayev =

Russian football player (born 1995)

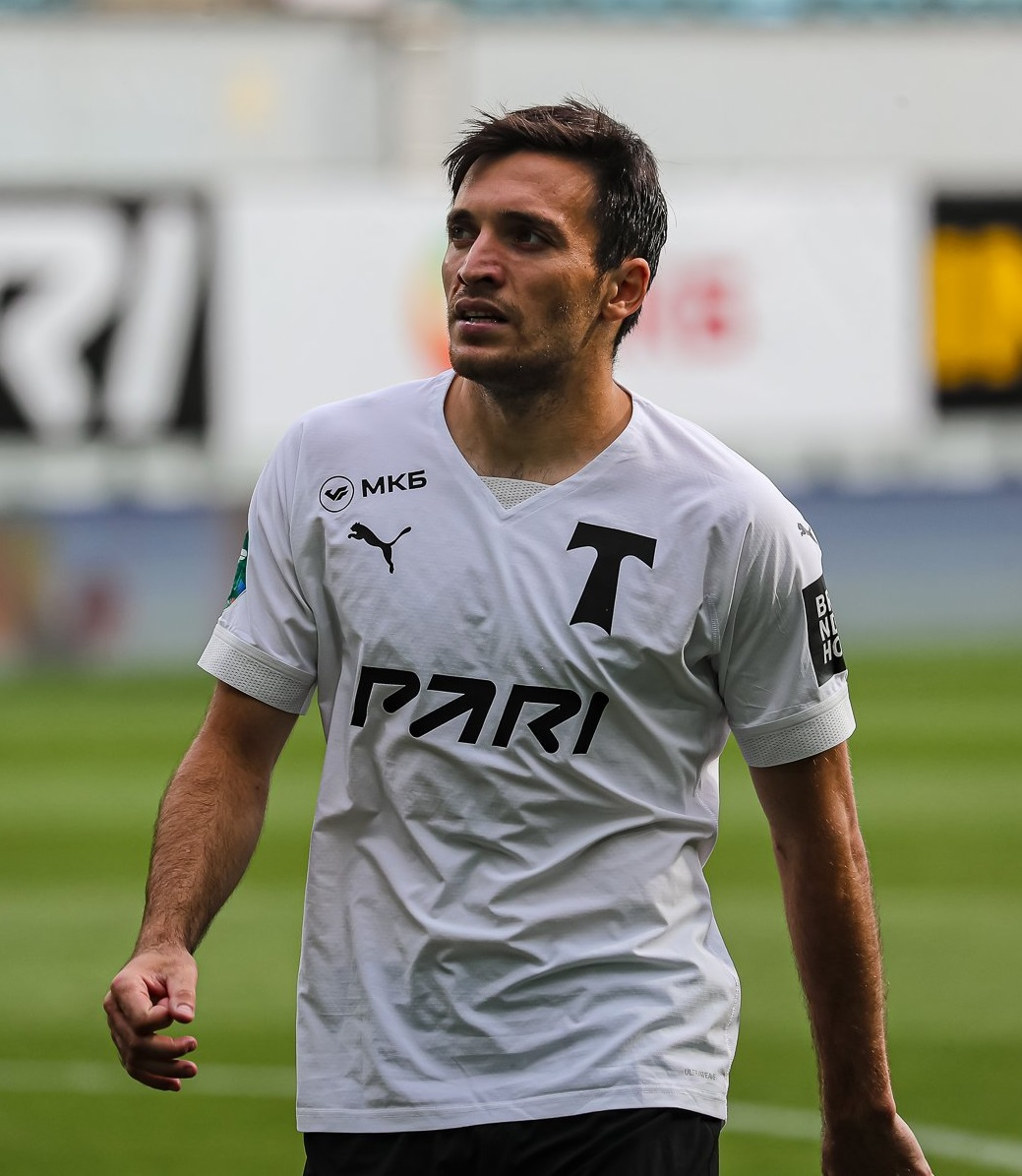
- Karayev with Torpedo Moscow in 2022

Personal information
- Full name: David Soslanovich Karayev
- Date of birth: 10 March 1995 (age 31)
- Place of birth: Vladikavkaz, Russia
- Height: 1.79 m (5 ft 10 in)
- Positions: Forward; midfielder

Team information
- Current team: Spartak Kostroma
- Number: 10

Youth career
- 2008–2010: Yunost Vladikavkaz
- 2010–2012: DYuSSh-70 Savyolovskaya Moscow
- 2012: Gubkin

Senior career*
Years	Team	Apps	(Gls)
2013–2014	SKA-Energiya Khabarovsk	3	(0)
2014	TSK Simferopol	0	(0)
2015	TSK Simferopol (KFS)	3	(1)
2015	Neftekhimik Nizhnekamsk	6	(1)
2016	Torpedo Armavir	1	(0)
2016–2017	Spartak Vladikavkaz	29	(4)
2017	SKA Rostov	13	(8)
2018	Khimki	2	(0)
2018	Olimp Moscow (amateur)	11	(19)
2018–2020	KAMAZ Naberezhnye Chelny	35	(18)
2020–2021	Ural Yekaterinburg	6	(0)
2020	→ Ural-2 Yekaterinburg	4	(1)
2021	→ Caspiy (loan)	18	(6)
2021–2022	SKA-Khabarovsk	37	(14)
2022–2023	Torpedo Moscow	29	(2)
2023–2024	Alania Vladikavkaz	16	(2)
2024–2026	KAMAZ Naberezhnye Chelny	64	(19)
2026–	Spartak Kostroma	0	(0)

International career
2013	Azerbaijan U-18	1	(0)
- * Club domestic league appearances and goals as of 16 May 2026

David Soslanovich Karayev (Azerbaijani: David Soslan oğlu Qarayev; Russian: Давид Сосланович Караев; born 10 March 1995) is a football player who plays for Spartak Kostroma.

== Club career ==
He made his debut in the Russian Football National League for SKA-Energiya Khabarovsk on 7 July 2013 in a game against Salyut Belgorod.

In February 2020, Karayev went on trial with CSKA Moscow

On 15 June 2020, he signed a contract with Ural Yekaterinburg. He made his Russian Premier League debut for Ural on 10 August 2020 in a game against Dynamo Moscow, he substituted Andrei Panyukov in the 71st minute.

On 28 February 2021, he moved to Caspiy in Kazakhstan on loan until the end of the 2020–21 season.

On 7 June 2022, Karayev signed a contract with Torpedo Moscow for two years with an option for the third year. His contract with Torpedo was terminated by mutual consent in June 2023.

== Career statistics ==
As of 16 May 2026

Club	Season	League			Cup		Other		Total	
Club	Season	Division	Apps	Goals	Apps	Goals	Apps	Goals	Apps	Goals
SKA-Energiya Khabarovsk	2012–13	Russian First League	0	0	—		0	0	0	0
SKA-Energiya Khabarovsk	2013–14	Russian First League	3	0	2	0	—		5	0
SKA-Energiya Khabarovsk	Total		3	0	2	0	0	0	5	0
TSK Simferopol	2014–15	Russian Second League	12 (Note: Club excluded mid-season and results annulled by UEFA decision)	4	—		—		12	4
Neftekhimik Nizhnekamsk	2015–16	Russian Second League	6	1	0	0	—		6	1
Torpedo Armavir	2015–16	Russian First League	1	0	—		—		1	0
Spartak Vladikavkaz	2016–17	Russian Second League	29	4	1	0	—		30	4
SKA Rostov	2017–18	Russian Second League	13	8	1	0	—		14	8
Khimki	2017–18	Russian First League	2	0	—		—		2	0
KAMAZ Naberezhnye Chelny	2018–19	Russian Second League	19	7	0	0	—		19	7
KAMAZ Naberezhnye Chelny	2019–20	Russian Second League	16	11	4	1	3 (Note: Appearances in FNL Cup)	1	23	13
KAMAZ Naberezhnye Chelny	Total		35	18	4	1	3	1	42	20
Ural Yekaterinburg	2020–21	Russian Premier League	6	0	2	1	—		8	1
Ural-2 Yekaterinburg	2020–21	Russian Second League	4	1	—		—		4	1
Caspiy (loan)	2021	Kazakhstan Premier League	18	6	—		—		18	6
SKA-Khabarovsk	2021–22	Russian First League	37	14	0	0	2 (Note: Appearances in promotion play-offs)	0	39	14
Torpedo Moscow	2022–23	Russian Premier League	29	2	6	2	—		35	4
Alania Vladikavkaz	2023–24	Russian First League	16	2	0	0	—		16	2
KAMAZ Naberezhnye Chelny	2024–25	Russian First League	30	6	0	0	—		30	6
KAMAZ Naberezhnye Chelny	2025–26	Russian First League	34	13	3	0	—		37	13
KAMAZ Naberezhnye Chelny	Total		64	19	3	0	0	0	67	19
Career total			263	75	19	4	5	1	287	80
