= Wajdi Sahli =

Tunisian footballer (born 1977)

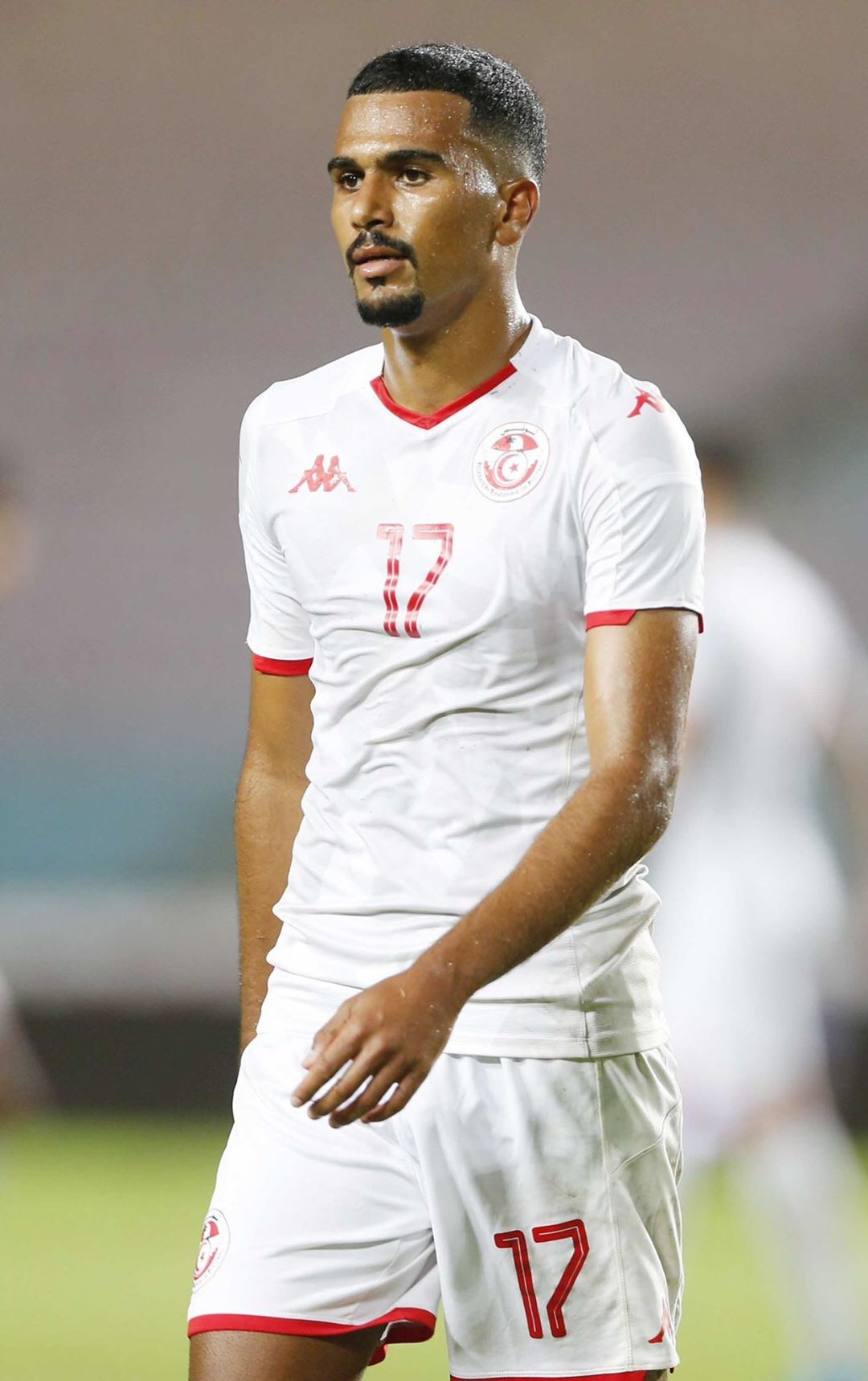
- Sahli representing Tunisia

Personal information
- Date of birth: 17 April 1997 (age 29)
- Place of birth: La Seyne-sur-Mer, France
- Height: 1.83 m (6 ft 0 in)
- Position: Left winger

Youth career
- ES Sahel

Senior career*
Years	Team	Apps	(Gls)
2018–2020	Club Africain	28	(2)
2021	Caspiy	17	(5)
2021–2022	Apollon Smyrnis	8	(0)
2022–2023	Sutjeska Nikšić	32	(6)
2023–2024	Radnički Kragujevac	31	(8)
2024–2025	Győr	23	(3)
2025–2026	Radnički 1923	25	(5)

International career^{‡}
2019	Tunisia U23	1	(1)
2024–	Tunisia	1	(0)
- * Club domestic league appearances and goals as of 18 July 2026 ‡ National team caps and goals as of 20 September 2025

Wajdi Sahli (Arabic: وَجْدِيّ سَاحِلِيّ; born 17 April 1997) is a professional footballer who plays as a right winger. Born in France, he represents Tunisia internationally.

== Early life ==
Sahli was born in France to a Tunisian family, and moved to Tunisia at a young age where he began playing football.

== Club career ==
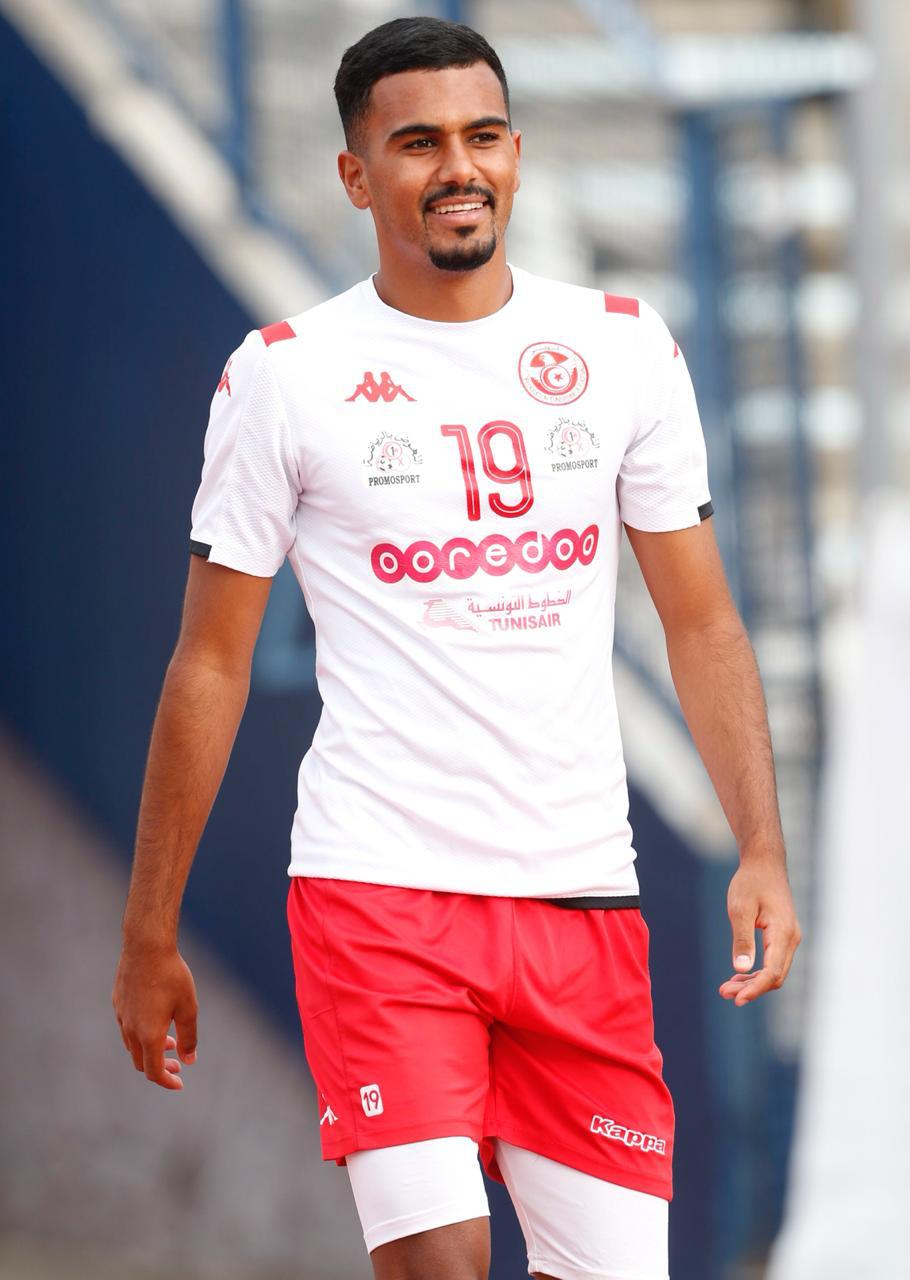

Sahli started playing as senior in Tunisia with the B team of Étoile Sportive du Sahelfrom where he moved to Club Africain and played for two and a half seasons there until February 2021, when he signed with Kazakh side FC Caspiy.

On 17 August 2021, Apollon Smyrnis announced the signing of Sahli.

A year later, on 10 August 2022, he signed with Montenegrin First League side FK Sutjeska Nikšić. After being the runner-up in the league and the Montenegrin Cup winner at the end of the 2022–23 season, he called the attention of Serbian side FK Radnički 1923, signing with them in summer 2023.

He became a regular player and was named as one of the main contributors for the clubs finishing in 4th place and historical achievement to play in European competitions next season.

== International career ==
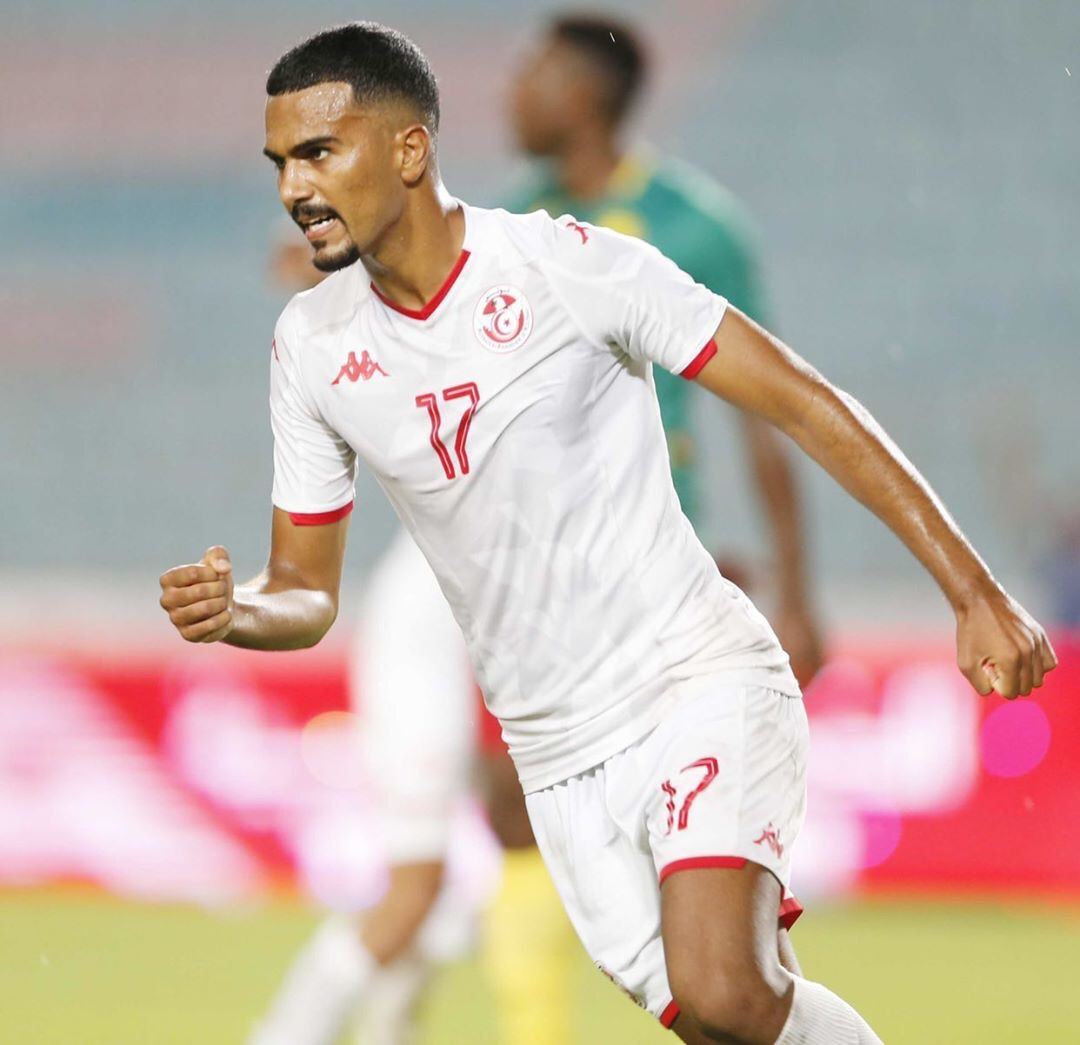
Sahli scoring a goal for Tunisian Olympic team in 2019

Sahli represented Tunisia in their Olympic squad. He was in the called for the Tunisian main squad in October 2019, but failed to make a debut. Instead, he played for the Tunisian under-23 team and, as a starter, he contributed with the first goal in their win by 2–1 over Cameroon.

On 29 May 2024, Sahli received again a call for the Tunisian main team for their qualifying games for the World Cup 2026. He made his debut on 9 June 2024 in a World Cup qualifier against Namibia at the Orlando Stadium in Johannesburg, South Africa. He substituted Hamza Rafia in the 88th minute as the game ended in a scoreless draw.

== Career statistics ==
As of match played 19 September 2022

Appearances and goals by club, season and competition
Club	Season	League			Cup		Continental		Other		Total	
Club	Season	Division	Apps	Goals	Apps	Goals	Apps	Goals	Apps	Goals	Apps	Goals
Club Africain	2017–18	Tunisian Ligue Professionnelle 1	2	0	0	0	—		—		2	0
Club Africain	2018–19	Tunisian Ligue Professionnelle 1	11	1	0	0	—		—		11	1
Club Africain	2019–20	Tunisian Ligue Professionnelle 1	15	1	6	1	—		—		21	2
Club Africain	Total		28	2	6	1	—		—		34	3
Caspiy	2021	Kazakhstan Premier League	17	5	4	1	—		—		21	6
Apollon Smyrnis	2021–22	Super League Greece	8	0	1	0	—		—		9	0
Career total			53	7	11	2	0	0	0	0	64	9

== Honours ==
Club Africain

- Tunisian Cup: 2018

Sutjeska

- Montenegrin Cup: 2023
