= Ruslan Mingazow =

Turkmen footballer (born 1991)

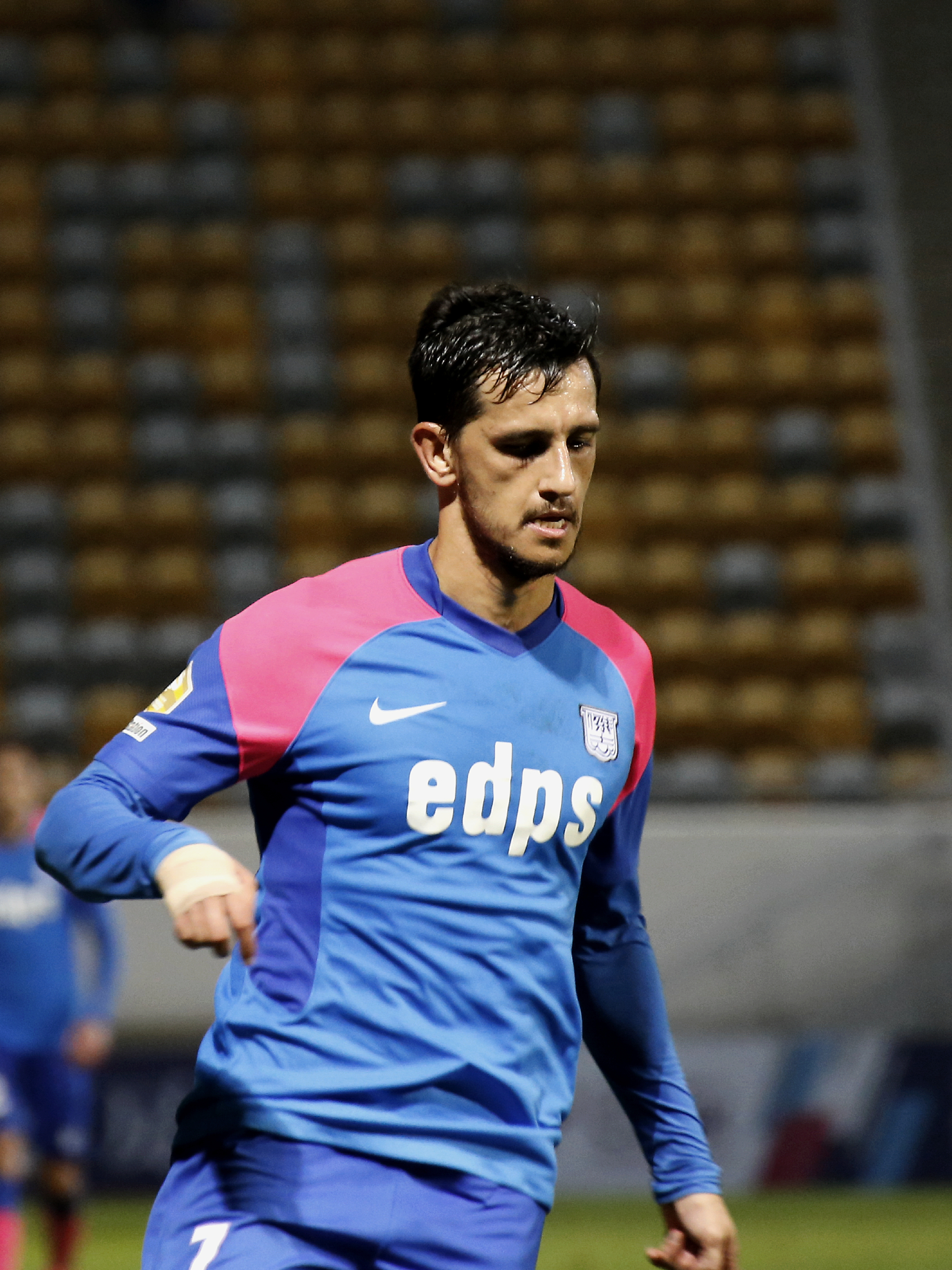
- Mingazow with Kitchee in 2023

Personal information
- Full name: Ruslan Kamilýewiç Mingazow
- Date of birth: 23 November 1991 (age 34)
- Place of birth: Ashgabat, Turkmenistan
- Height: 1.75 m (5 ft 9 in)
- Position: Midfielder

Team information
- Current team: Kitchee
- Number: 7

Senior career*
Years	Team	Apps	(Gls)
2007–2009	Aşgabat	61	(19)
2009–2014	Skonto Rīga	112	(34)
2014–2016	Jablonec	40	(10)
2016–2019	Slavia Prague	19	(3)
2017	→ Mladá Boleslav (loan)	7	(2)
2018–2019	→ Příbram (loan)	20	(4)
2019–2020	Irtysh Pavlodar	11	(2)
2020	Shakhter Karagandy	13	(3)
2021–2022	Caspiy	20	(5)
2022–	Kitchee	64	(29)

International career^{‡}
2009–2023	Turkmenistan	30	(6)
- * Club domestic league appearances and goals as of 19 October 2026 ‡ National team caps and goals as of 22 November 2023

Ruslan Kamilýewiç Mingazow (Tatar: Руслан Камил улы Минһаҗев; born 23 November 1991) is a Turkmen professional footballer who currently plays as a midfielder for Hong Kong Premier League club Kitchee and the Turkmenistan national team.

== Club career ==
=== Early career ===
Ruslan Mingazov started playing football at the age of 6, being taken to the first training by his father, Kamil, who is also a former Turkmeni footballer. At the beginning he had to train with an older group of players because there was none for his age. Mingazow played for FC Aşgabat youth team and was taken to the first team in 2007, aged 16. The same year he helped his club win the Turkmenistan Super Cup. A year later Mingazow became the champion of Turkmenistan, winning the 2008 Ýokary Liga. In 2009 Mingazow participated in the Turkmenistan President's Cup and helped his club reach the semi-finals, scoring two goals in three matches.

=== Skonto Rīga ===
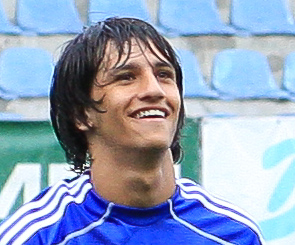
Mingazow in Skonto

Following the impressive performance at the Turkmenistan President's Cup, Mingazow was invited to join the tournament's finalists, Latvian Higher League club Skonto Rīga, on trial by their manager Paul Ashworth. Having received another offer from Armenian Premier League, Mingazow, eventually, signed a contract with the Latvian side in June 2009. He scored his first Latvian Higher League goal in a 5–0 victory over Daugava Rīga on 8 July 2009. During his first season at the club Mingazow participated in 20 league matches, scoring twice. In 2010 Mingazow helped Skonto become the champions of Latvia for the first time since 2004 under their new manager Aleksandrs Starkovs. In 2011 Skonto won the Baltic League, beating another Latvian side FK Ventspils in the final's penalty shoot-out. In 2012 Mingazow won the Latvian Cup, as Skonto beat Liepājas Metalurgs in the final via penalty shoot-out. On 4 July 2013 Mingazow scored the only goal in 1–0 away victory over FC Tiraspol, helping Skonto reach the second round of the 2013–14 UEFA Europa League. In the second round Mingazow provided an excellent assist for his team-mate Artūrs Karašausks as Skonto beat the Synot liga side Slovan Liberec 2–1 at home. Mingazow was named the best player of the Latvian Higher League in August 2013.

=== Baumit Jablonec ===
On 27 August 2014 Mingazow joined the Czech First League club Baumit Jablonec.

=== Slavia Prague ===
Mingazow joined another Czech First League team, Slavia Prague, in June 2016. On 2 April 2017, he gained notoriety in Czech press after winning a controversial penalty kick in the Sparta - Slavia derby, allowing Slavia to equalize from the spot in injury time. The disciplinary board of referees later ruled that it had been a dive by Mingazow, but no punishment was issued. He scored his first league goal for Slavia on 17 April 2017 in a 4–0 home win against Hradec Králové. On 15 June 2018, Slavia announced that Mingazow will be looking for new opportunities and will no longer play for Slavia. On 7 September 2018, Slavia announced that Mingazow had joined 1. FK Příbram on loan for the first half of the season.

=== Irtysh Pavlodar ===
23 July 2019 Ruslan Mingazow, as a free agent, signed a contract with Kazakhstani FC Irtysh Pavlodar. In December 2019, he extended the contract until the end of 2020. In the spring of 2020, due to financial problems, FC Irtysh Pavlodar withdrew from the championship of Kazakhstan. The footballer spent 13 matches for FC Irtysh Pavlodar, scored 2 goals and gave 3 assists in the Kazakhstan Premier League.

=== Shakhter Karagandy ===
On 6 August 2020, Mingazow signed for Kazakh club FC Shakhter Karagandy, making his debut on 19 August, in a 1-0 defeat to FC Kaisar.

=== Caspiy ===
On 26 February 2021, FC Caspiy announced the signing of Mingazow.

=== Kitchee ===
On 3 March 2022, Kitchee announced the signing of Mingazow.

On 16 April 2022, Mingazow made his debut for Kitchee in a 2022 AFC Champions League group stage match against Chiangrai United, in which he scored the winning goal for the club.

In January 2023, Kitchee announced the extension of Ruslan Mingazov's contract until 2025.

On 23 May 2023, Mingazow was named the player of the season in Hong Kong Top Footballer Awards.

== International career ==
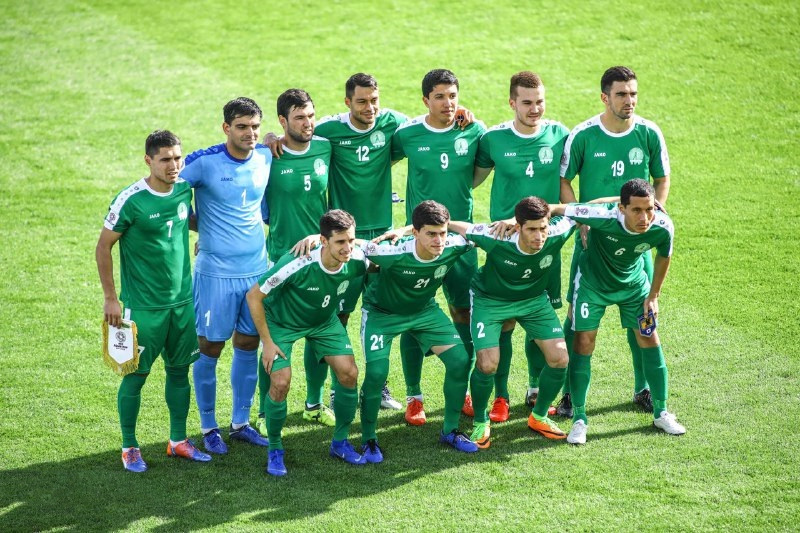
No.8 Mingazow at 2019 AFC Asian Cup with Turkmenistan national team

Mingazow made his senior national team debut on 14 April 2009, in a 2010 AFC Challenge Cup Qualification match against Maldives. He scored his first national team goal against Bhutan in the very next match on 16 April 2009, also in AFC Challenge Cup qualifying.

== Personal life ==
Mingazow is an ethnic Tatar. Ruslan Mingazow's father Kamil is also a former Turkmenistani footballer, who played for the national team. He has got two sisters, one of whom is 3 years older and the other one 14 years younger. His younger sister, Kamila Mingazowa, is also a professional footballer and futsal player. During his stay in Riga Mingazow was studying business management at the Baltic International Academy.

== Career statistics ==
=== Club ===
As of match played 31 May 2024

Appearances and goals by club, season and competition
Club	Season	League			National Cup		Continental		Other		Total	
Club	Season	Division	Apps	Goals	Apps	Goals	Apps	Goals	Apps	Goals	Apps	Goals
Skonto	2009	Latvian Higher League	20	2	0	0	1 (Note: Appearances in the UEFA Europa League)	0	—		21	2
Skonto	2010	Latvian Higher League	16	8	2	0	0	0	—		18	8
Skonto	2011	Latvian Higher League	13	1	2	0	2 (Note: Appearances in the UEFA Champions League)	0	—		17	1
Skonto	2012	Latvian Higher League	29	6	2	0	1	0	—		32	6
Skonto	2013	Latvian Higher League	18	8	4	2	4	1	—		26	11
Skonto	2014	Latvian Higher League	16	9	1	1	—		—		17	10
Skonto	Total		112	34	11	3	8	1	—	—	131	38
Jablonec	2014–15	Czech First League	24	5	8	2	—		—		0	0
Jablonec	2015–16	Czech First League	16	5	4	1	3	0	—		0	0
Jablonec	Total		40	10	12	3	3	0	—	—	55	13
Slavia Prague	2016–17	Czech First League	16	3	3	2	2	0	—		21	5
Slavia Prague	2017–18	Czech First League	3	0	0	0	1 (Note: 1 Appearance in the UEFA Champions League, and 0 Appearances in the UEFA Europa League)	0	—		4	0
Slavia Prague	2017–18	Czech First League	0	0	0	0	0 (Note: 0 Appearances in the UEFA Champions League, and 0 Appearances in the UEFA Europa League)	0	—		0	0
Slavia Prague	Total		19	3	3	2	3	0	—	—	25	5
Mladá Boleslav (loan)	2017–18	Czech First League	7	2	1	0	—		—		8	2
1. FK Příbram (loan)	2018–19	Czech First League	20	4	1	0	—		0 (Note: Appearances in the Czech First League Relegation play-offs)	0	20	4
Irtysh Pavlodar	2019	Kazakhstan Premier League	11	2	0	0	—		—		11	2
Irtysh Pavlodar	2020	Kazakhstan Premier League	2	0	0	0	—		—		2	0
Irtysh Pavlodar	Total		13	2	0	0	—	—	—	—	13	2
Shakhter Karagandy	2020	Kazakhstan Premier League	13	3	0	0	—		—		13	3
Caspiy	2021	Kazakhstan Premier League	20	5	0	0	—		—		20	5
Kitchee	2022–23	Hong Kong Premier League	18	17	4	3	5	1	0	0	27	21
Kitchee	2023–24	Hong Kong Premier League	11	4	6	4	4	0			21	8
Kitchee	Total		29	21	10	7	9	1	0	0	48	29
Career total			273	84	38	15	23	6	0	0	334	101

=== International ===
As of match played 21 November 2023

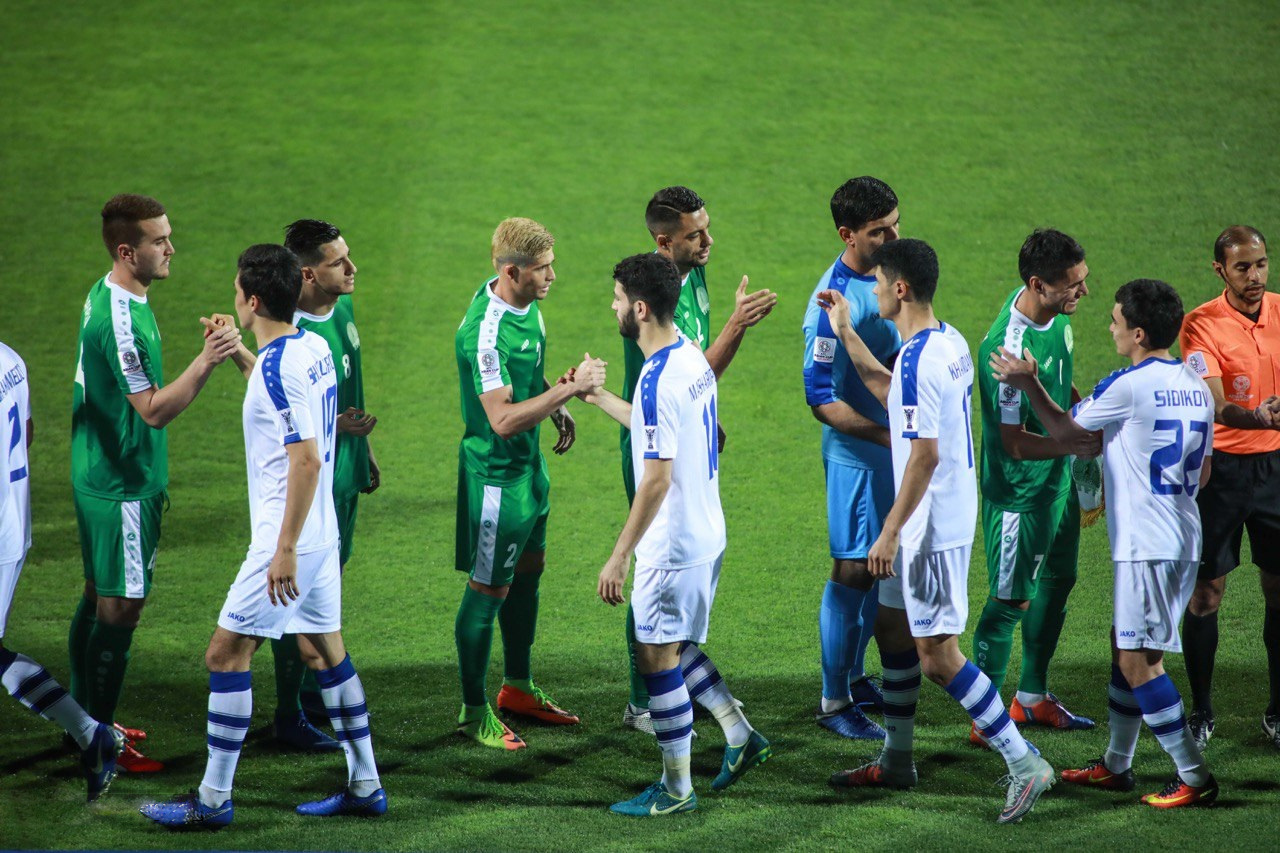
Turkmenistan & Uzbekistan Group F match, 2019 AFC Asian Cup

Appearances and goals by national team and year
National team	Year	Apps	Goals
Turkmenistan	2009	2	1
Turkmenistan	2010	3	0
Turkmenistan	2011	2	0
Turkmenistan	2012	5	1
Turkmenistan	2013	0	0
Turkmenistan	2014	1	0
Turkmenistan	2015	3	1
Turkmenistan	2016	0	0
Turkmenistan	2017	3	1
Turkmenistan	2018	2	0
Turkmenistan	2019	4	1
Turkmenistan	2020	0	0
Turkmenistan	2021	0	0
Turkmenistan	2022	0	0
Turkmenistan	2023	5	2
Total		30	6

Scores and results list Turkmenistan's goal tally first, score column indicates score after each Mingazow goal.

List of international goals scored by Ruslan Mingazow
No.	Date	Venue	Opponent	Score	Result	Competition	Ref.
1	16 April 2009	Rasmee Dhandu Stadium, Malé, Maldives	Bhutan	4–0	7–0	2010 AFC Challenge Cup qualification	
2	8 March 2012	Halchowk Stadium, Kathmandu, Nepal	Maldives	1–1	3–1	2012 AFC Challenge Cup	
3	16 June 2015	Sport toplumy, Dashoguz, Turkmenistan	Iran	1–1	1–1	2018 FIFA World Cup qualification	
4	28 March 2017	Taipei Municipal Stadium, Taipei, Taiwan	Chinese Taipei	2–0	3–1	2019 AFC Asian Cup qualification	
5	21 November 2023	Hong Kong Stadium, Hong Kong	Hong Kong	1–0	2–2	2026 FIFA World Cup qualification	
6	21 November 2023	Hong Kong Stadium, Hong Kong	Hong Kong	2–1	2–2	2026 FIFA World Cup qualification	

== Honours ==
Aşgabat

- Ýokary Liga: 2008
- Turkmenistan Super Cup: 2007

Skonto

- Latvian Higher League: 2010
- Latvian Football Cup: 2011–12
- Baltic League: 2010–11

Slavia Prague

- Czech First League: 2016–17

Kitchee

- Hong Kong Premier League: 2022–23, 2025–26
- Hong Kong Senior Challenge Shield: 2022–23, 2023–24
- Hong Kong FA Cup: 2022–23
- HKPLC Cup: 2023–24

Individual

- Hong Kong Premier League top goalscorer: 2022–23
- Hong Kong Premier League Footballer of the Year: 2022–23
- Hong Kong Premier League Team of the Year: 2022–23
