= Andrey Zaleski =

Belarusian footballer

Personal information
- Date of birth: 20 January 1991 (age 35)
- Place of birth: Novogrudok, Grodno Oblast, Belarusian SSR
- Height: 1.79 m (5 ft 10 in)
- Position: Right back

Team information
- Current team: Arsenal Dzerzhinsk
- Number: 31

Youth career
- 2008–2009: Dinamo Minsk

Senior career*
Years	Team	Apps	(Gls)
2009–2014	Dinamo Minsk	38	(0)
2012–2013	→ Bereza-2010 (loan)	57	(3)
2015–2017	Slutsk	72	(1)
2018	Dinamo Brest	16	(0)
2019	Dinamo Minsk	12	(0)
2020	Zhetysu	14	(1)
2021–2022	Turan	45	(0)
2023–2024	Slavia Mozyr	48	(2)
2025	Isloch Minsk Raion	12	(0)
2026–	Arsenal Dzerzhinsk	12	(0)

International career^{‡}
2009	Belarus U19	4	(0)
2010–2011	Belarus U21	7	(0)
2017	Belarus B	1	(0)
- * Club domestic league appearances and goals as of 3 July 2026 ‡ National team caps and goals as of 14 July 2017

Andrey Zaleski (Belarusian: Андрэй Залескі; Russian: Андрей Залеский; born 20 January 1991) is a Belarusian professional football player currently playing for Arsenal Dzerzhinsk.

His younger brother Aleksey Zaleski is also a professional footballer.

== Honours ==
Dinamo Brest

- Belarusian Cup winner: 2017–18
- Belarusian Super Cup winner: 2018
