= Zhastar Stadium =

Zhas Kanat Stadium
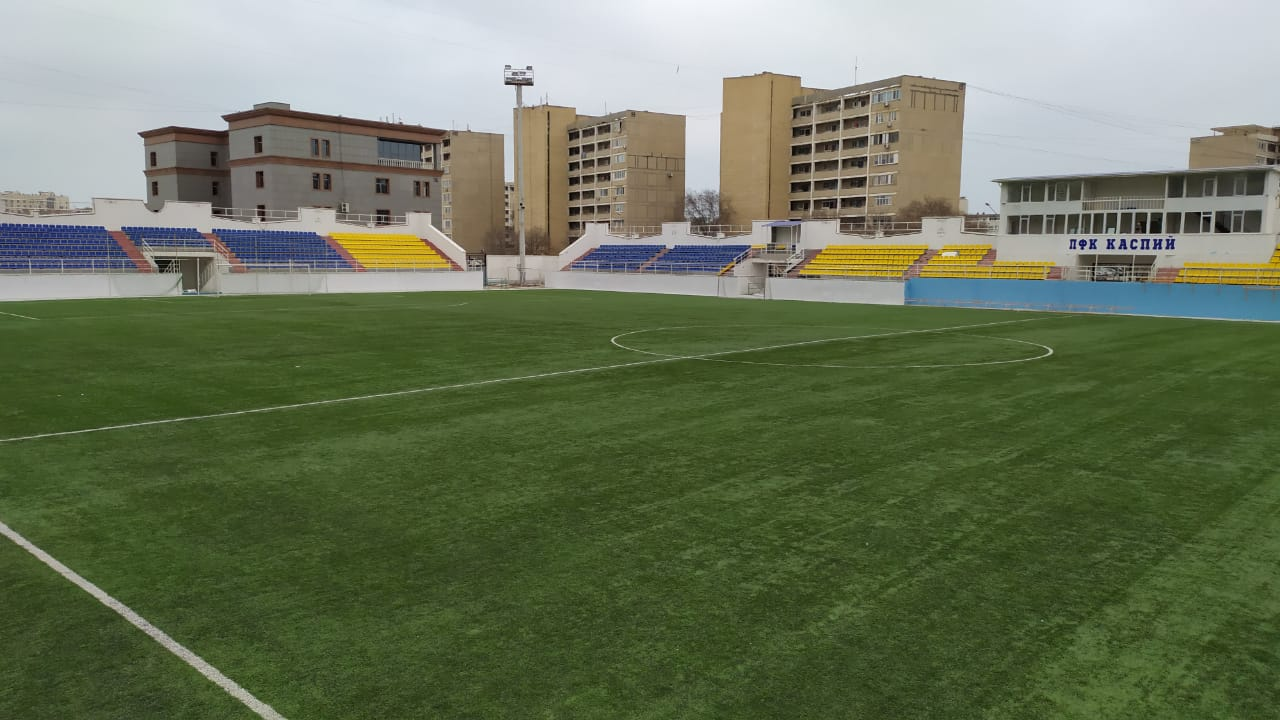
- Interactive map of Zhas Kanat Stadium
- Location: Zhas Kanat Stadium; 12 microdistrict Aktau; Kazakhstan
- Coordinates: 43°39′52″N 51°8′50″E
- Owner: Municipality of Aktau
- Operator: "Zhas Kanat Sportcomplex" MKKK
- Capacity: 5,000
- Surface: Synthetic; 110m x 70m

Construction
- Opened: April 19, 1995
- Renovated: April 18, 2018

Tenant
- FC Caspiy

Zhas Kanat Stadium is a multi-use stadium in Aktau, Kazakhstan. It is currently used mostly for football matches and is the home stadium of FC Caspiy, which plays in the country's top-tier Kazakhstan Premier League.

== History ==
The stadium was opened on April 19, 1995. The stadium's first match was held between "Munayshy" and "Elimay".

In 2014, the authorities announced a possible transfer of the Zhas Kanat Stadium into private hands which caused a lot of indignation among parents of children training at the stadium, as well as among the coaches of the sports departments.

The Kazakhstan Football Federation banned championship and cup matches at the stadium in early 2017 because of its inappropriate surface. Subsequently FC Caspiy had to play the home matches in Shymkent. The refurbishment began on 18 April 2018 and was completed in August 2018. The renovation increased the capacity of the Stadium from 4,500 to 5,000. On 17 August 2018, the first training session took place on the renovated area. On 11 September 2018, the Kazakhstan Football Federation lifted the ban. FC Caspiy played its first match in the renovated stadium on 23 September against the club FC Kairat from Almaty. However, in April 2019, another inspection found that the stadium did not meet the requirements of the Kazakhstan Premier League Championship.

== Features ==
The dimensions of the stadium are 110×70m and the capacity is 5,000 spectators. The surface of the stadium is artificial turf and is not heated.
