= Aleksey Zalesky =

Belarusian footballer

Personal information
- Full name: Aleksey Ivanovich Zalesky
- Date of birth: 7 October 1994 (age 32)
- Place of birth: Minsk, Belarus
- Height: 1.79 m (5 ft 10 1/2 in)
- Position: Defender

Team information
- Current team: Torpedo-BelAZ Zhodino
- Number: 13

Youth career
- 2009–2010: Dinamo Minsk

Senior career*
Years	Team	Apps	(Gls)
2011–2016	Dinamo Minsk	2	(0)
2013–2014	→ Bereza-2010 (loan)	45	(0)
2015–2016	→ Slutsk (loan)	41	(1)
2017–2018	Vitebsk	34	(0)
2018	→ Luch Minsk (loan)	19	(0)
2019	Dnyapro Mogilev	26	(5)
2020	Minsk	25	(1)
2021	Caspiy	22	(4)
2022	Torpedo-BelAZ Zhodino	27	(1)
2023	Caspiy	9	(2)
2023–2024	Torpedo-BelAZ Zhodino	31	(3)
2025	Maxline Vitebsk	26	(0)
2026–	Torpedo-BelAZ Zhodino	8	(0)

International career^{‡}
2010	Belarus U17	3	(0)
2012	Belarus U19	3	(0)
2013–2016	Belarus U21	25	(1)
- * Club domestic league appearances and goals as of 3 July 2026 ‡ National team caps and goals as of 31 December 2016

Aleksey Ivanovich Zalesky (Belarusian: Аляксей Іванавіч Залескі; Russian: Алексей Иванович Залеский; born 7 October 1994) is a Belarusian professional footballer who plays for Torpedo-BelAZ Zhodino. His older brother Andrey Zalesky is also a professional footballer.
