= Chafik Tigroudja =

French footballer (born 1992)

Personal information
- Date of birth: 16 January 1992 (age 34)
- Place of birth: Lille, France
- Height: 1.76 m (5 ft 9 1/2 in)
- Position: Attacking midfielder

Senior career*
| Years | Team | Apps | (Gls) |
| 2011–2014 | Le Pontet | 62 | (5) |
| 2014–2016 | Chamois Niortais | 27 | (1) |
| 2016–2017 | Les Herbiers | 33 | (3) |
| 2017–2018 | Alki Oroklini | 31 | (4) |
| 2018 | Kukësi | 10 | (0) |
| 2019–2020 | Zira | 17 | (2) |
| 2020–2021 | USP Grand Avignon | | |
| 2021–2022 | Caspiy | 23 | (2) |
| 2023 | Panevėžys | 33 | (3) |
- * Club domestic league appearances and goals as of 8 February 2024

Chafik Tigroudja (born 16 January 1992) is a French professional footballer who plays as an attacking midfielder. He has previously represented Le Pontet, Chamois Niortais, Les Herbiers, Alki Oroklini, FK Kukësi and FK Panevėžys.

== Playing career ==
Tigroudja began his senior career with Le Pontet, where he made 62 league appearances. In the summer of 2014, he joined Ligue 2 side Chamois Niortais on a two-year contract. Tigroudja made his debut for the club in the 2–0 win at Genêts Anglet in the eighth round of the Coupe de France. He went on to play his first professional league match the following week, coming on as a late substitute for Djiman Koukou in the 0–1 home defeat to Sochaux. He went on to play 27 league matches during two seasons with the club. At the end of the 2015–16 season, Tigroudja was released by Niort and subsequently signed for Les Herbiers on a free transfer.

On 11 February 2019, Tigroudja signed for Zira FK. On 10 June 2019, Tigroudja signed a new two-year contract with Zira.

== Career statistics ==
As of 1 March 2017.

Appearances and goals by club, season and competition
| Club | Season | League | | | National cup (Note: Includes Coupe de France.) | | League cup (Note: Includes Coupe de la Ligue.) | | Total | |
| Club | Season | Division | Apps | Goals | Apps | Goals | Apps | Goals | Apps | Goals |
|---|---|---|---|---|---|---|---|---|---|---|
| Le Pontet | 2011–12 | CFA Group C | 9 | 0 | 1 | 0 | 0 | 0 | 10 | 0 |
| Le Pontet | 2012–13 | CFA Group C | 29 | 5 | 0 | 0 | 0 | 0 | 29 | 5 |
| Le Pontet | 2013–14 | CFA Group C | 24 | 0 | 2 | 0 | 0 | 0 | 26 | 0 |
| Chamois Niortais | 2014–15 | Ligue 2 | 9 | 0 | 2 | 0 | 0 | 0 | 11 | 0 |
| Chamois Niortais | 2015–16 | Ligue 2 | 18 | 1 | 3 | 0 | 1 | 0 | 22 | 1 |
| Les Herbiers | 2016–17 | National | 21 | 1 | 5 | 3 | 0 | 0 | 26 | 4 |
| Career total | | | 110 | 7 | 13 | 3 | 1 | 0 | 124 | 10 |
