= Maksat Taykenov =

Kazakhstani footballer

Personal information
- Full name: Maksat Yesengeldiuly Taykenov
- Date of birth: 14 August 1997 (age 29)
- Place of birth: Aktau, Kazakhstan
- Height: 1.69 m (5 ft 7 in)
- Position: Midfielder

Team information
- Current team: Caspiy
- Number: 19

Senior career*
Years	Team	Apps	(Gls)
2015–2018	Bayterek	32	(1)
2018–2024	Caspiy	112	(3)
2025	Zhetysu	12	(0)
2025–	Caspiy	34	(1)

International career^{‡}
2021–	Kazakhstan	4	(0)
- * Club domestic league appearances and goals as of 1 November 2026 ‡ National team caps and goals as of 19:02, 17 April 2023 (UTC)

Maksat Yesengeldiuly Taykenov (Kazakh: Мақсат Есенгелдіұлы Тәйкенов, Maqsat Esengeldıūly Täikenov; born 14 August 1997) is a Kazakhstani footballer who plays as a midfielder for Caspiy and the Kazakhstan national team.

== Career ==
Taykenov began his senior career with Bayterek, before moving to Caspiy in 2018. He made his professional debut with Caspiy in a 3–0 Kazakhstan Premier League loss to FC Kairat on 18 August 2020.

== International career ==
Taykenov made his international debut for the Kazakhstan national team in a 0–1 loss to Finland at Helsinki Olympic Stadium on 4 September 2021, during the 2022 FIFA World Cup qualification.
