= Nikola Cuckić =

Serbian footballer (born 1997)

Personal information
- Date of birth: 11 April 1997 (age 29)
- Place of birth: Gnjilane, FR Yugoslavia
- Height: 1.74 m (5 ft 9 in)
- Position: Midfielder

Team information
- Current team: Kaisar
- Number: 24

Youth career
- Radnički Niš
- OFK Beograd

Senior career*
Years	Team	Apps	(Gls)
2014–2017	OFK Beograd	44	(5)
2017	Mladost Lučani	2	(0)
2017–2018	Zemun	6	(0)
2018–2020	Javor Ivanjica	42	(2)
2020	Aktobe	8	(1)
2021–2023	Caspiy	48	(3)
2023–2024	Zhetysu	24	(2)
2024	Turan Turkistan	21	(4)
2025	Okzhetpes	22	(2)
2026–	Kaisar	29	(4)

International career
2015	Serbia U18	3	(0)
2015	Serbia U19	2	(0)
- * Club domestic league appearances and goals as of 19:05, 3 November 2026 (UTC)

Nikola Cuckić (Serbian Cyrillic: Никола Цуцкић; born 11 April 1997) is a Serbian professional footballer who plays as a midfielder for Kazakhstani club Kaisar.
