= Taras Bondarenko =

Ukrainian footballer

Personal information
- Full name: Taras Romanovych Bondarenko
- Date of birth: 23 September 1992 (age 34)
- Place of birth: Zaporizhzhia, Ukraine
- Height: 1.87 m (6 ft 1 1/2 in)
- Position: Centre-back

Team information
- Current team: Tatran Prešov on loan from Podbrezová
- Number: 55

Youth career
- SSSOR-Metalurh Zaporizhzhia

Senior career*
Years	Team	Apps	(Gls)
2008–2014	Metalurh Zaporizhzhia	0	(0)
2008–2012	→ Metalurh-2 Zaporizhzhia	59	(2)
2014–2016	Poltava	26	(0)
2015–2016	→ Avanhard Kramatorsk (loan)	20	(1)
2016–2018	Metalac Gornji Milanovac	63	(3)
2018–2019	Radnički Niš	43	(2)
2020	Caspiy	3	(1)
2020	Okzhetpes	16	(2)
2021–2022	Caspiy	52	(0)
2023	Radnik Surdulica	17	(2)
2023–2025	AS Trenčín	64	(1)
2025–	Podbrezová	2	(0)
2025–2026	→ Tatran Prešov (loan)	25	(0)
- * Club domestic league appearances and goals as of 25 May 2026

Taras Romanovych Bondarenko (Ukrainian: Тарас Романович Бондаренко; born 23 September 1992) is a Ukrainian footballer who plays as a centre-back for Tatran Prešov in the Slovak Niké liga, on loan from FK Železiarne Podbrezová.

== Career ==
Born in Zaporizhzhia, Bondarenko started playing in the SSSOR-Metalurh Zaporizhzhia which serves as a junior team for the FC Metalurh Zaporizhzhia franchise. He made his debut as senior playing with FC Metalurh-2 Zaporizhzhia in the 2008–09 Ukrainian Second League. Nest season he played with FC Metalurh Zaporizhzhia Reserves and Youth Team in the 2009–10 Ukrainian Premier League Reserves where he made 22 appearances. Following two seasons, between 2010 and 2012, Bondarenko played again with Metalurh-2 in the 2010–11 and 2011–12 seasons of the Ukrainian Second League where all together Bondarenko made 40 appearances and scored five goals in those two seasons.

That two last seasons were marked by unfortunate events, in the first one, 2010–11, Metalurh main team got relegated from the Ukrainian Premier League for the first time ever since Ukrainian independence. Next season, despite the fact that the main club archived its come back to Ukrainian elite, it was the reserves squad, Metalurh-2, which ended up the season relegated, thus leaving many perspective players such as Bondarenko, which Metalurh was forming for its near future to prepare for the main team, without a solid platform where to play. Eventually this meant many players left the club, among them Bondarenko as well, which joined FC Poltava. It ended up being a good move for Bondarenko since he grabbed the starting line-up spot of the main team. He played with Poltava the entire 2014–15 and the beginning of the 2015–16 Ukrainian First League, making 26 appearances in total in the league. Bondarenko also played with Poltava in the 2014–15 and 2015–16 Ukrainian Cup editions.

After a disappointing start of Poltava, Bondarenko signed with FC Avanhard Kramatorsk and played the rest of the season with them in the 2015–16 Ukrainian First League. Avanhard finished the season in the second half of the table, and Bondrenko next move was to go abroad. He joined Serbian club FK Metalac Gornji Milanovac summer camp, and after a period of trials, he got a contract. He made a debut in the 2016–17 Serbian SuperLiga as a starter in a first-round home game against FK Borac Čačak which finished with Metalac's victory of 1–0. At the end of the season, Metalac was relegated, and Bondarenko stayed with the club playing next season in second level, the Serbian First League. In summer 2018, Bondarenko joined FK Radnički Niš on a free transfer.

In February 2020 he signed a contract with FC Caspiy.

== Personal life ==
Taras Bondarenko is the son of Roman Bondarenko, a Turkmenistan international footballer.
