= Nenad Gavrić =

Serbian footballer

Personal information
- Date of birth: 12 December 1991 (age 34)
- Place of birth: Šabac, SR Serbia, SFR Yugoslavia
- Height: 1.76 m (5 ft 9 in)
- Position: Winger

Team information
- Current team: Proleter 023
- Number: 16

Youth career
- Jedinstvo Štitar
- Mačva Šabac

Senior career*
Years	Team	Apps	(Gls)
2008–2011	Mačva Šabac	83	(27)
2012–2014	Napredak Kruševac	69	(23)
2014–2016	Red Star Belgrade	22	(2)
2016	Vojvodina	4	(0)
2017	Mladost Lučani	12	(1)
2017–2019	Mačva Šabac	54	(11)
2019–2020	Napredak Kruševac	18	(4)
2020–2021	Radnički Niš	31	(9)
2021	Caspiy	7	(2)
2022	Xanthi	16	(1)
2022–2023	Novi Pazar	19	(1)
2023	Egaleo	8	(1)
2024	Dečić	11	(3)
2024–2025	Mačva Šabac	29	(1)
2026	Dinamo Jug	15	(0)
2026–	Proleter 023	0	(0)
- * Club domestic league appearances and goals as of 14 May 2026

Nenad Gavrić (Serbian Cyrillic: Ненад Гаврић; born 12 December 1991) is a Serbian professional footballer who plays as a winger for Proleter 023.

== Career ==
Born in Šabac, Gavrić started his senior career with Mačva Šabac in the Serbian League West, making 83 appearances and scoring 27 goals in four seasons.

In January 2012, Gavrić joined Napredak Kruševac and took squad number 44. He played 13 matches during the second half of the 2011–12 Serbian First League season and scored 4 goals. For the next season, he changed his jersey number to 12. He made 28 league appearances and scored 14 goals, becoming the team's second highest scorer, behind Nenad Mirosavljević, and the fourth highest scorer of the 2012–13 Serbian First League. He usually played as a winger, frequently switching sides with Nikola Trujić.

In summer 2014, Gavrić signed with Red Star Belgrade after new coach Nenad Lalatović had insisted on a transfer. He made his debut for the club on 23 August 2014 in the 3rd fixture of the 2014–15 Serbian SuperLiga, replacing Nejc Pečnik in the 60th minute of the match against Vojvodina. During the season, Gavrić played 15 league and 2 cup matches scoring 2 goals, both for the first half-season. He was also with the club for the 2015–16, but made just 8 appearances at total under Miodrag Božović.

On last day of the summer 2016 transfer window, Gavrić signed with Vojvodina. He noted five appearances for the club, but had some conflict with club later and spent the rest of first half-season without of the first team.

In the 2017 winter break, Gavrić moved to Mladost Lučani. Playing for Mladost, Gavrić capped 15 times in at total in all competitions and scored 1 goal. In August 2017 he left the club as a free agent. On the last day of the summer transfer window 2017, Gavrić returned for second spell to his home club Mačva Šabac.

== Career statistics ==
As of 6 July 2019

Appearances and goals by club, season and competition
Club	Season	League			Cup		Continental		Other		Total	
Club	Season	Division	Apps	Goals	Apps	Goals	Apps	Goals	Apps	Goals	Apps	Goals
Mačva Šabac	2008–09	Serbian League West	15	3	—		—		—		15	3
Mačva Šabac	2009–10	Serbian League West	26	4	—		—		—		26	4
Mačva Šabac	2010–11	Serbian League West	28	12	—		—		—		28	12
Mačva Šabac	2011–12	Serbian League West	14	8	—		—		—		14	8
Mačva Šabac	Total		83	27	—		—		—		83	27
Napredak Kruševac	2011–12	Serbian First League	13	4	—		—		—		13	4
Napredak Kruševac	2012–13	Serbian First League	28	13	1	0	—		—		29	13
Napredak Kruševac	2013–14	Serbian SuperLiga	28	6	2	0	—		—		30	6
Napredak Kruševac	Total		69	23	3	0	—		—		72	23
Red Star Belgrade	2014–15	Serbian SuperLiga	15	2	2	0	—		—		17	2
Red Star Belgrade	2015–16	Serbian SuperLiga	7	0	0	0	1	0	—		8	0
Red Star Belgrade	Total		22	2	2	0	1	0	—		25	2
Vojvodina	2016–17	Serbian SuperLiga	4	0	1	0	0	0	—		5	0
Mladost Lučani	2016–17	Serbian SuperLiga	12	1	1	0	—		—		13	1
Mladost Lučani	2017–18	Serbian SuperLiga	0	0	—		2	0	—		2	0
Mladost Lučani	Total		12	1	1	0	2	0	—		15	1
Mačva Šabac	2017–18	Serbian SuperLiga	23	5	4	0	—		—		27	5
Mačva Šabac	2018–19	Serbian SuperLiga	31	6	2	0	—		—		33	6
Mačva Šabac	Total		54	11	6	0	—		—		60	11
Career total			244	64	13	0	3	0	—		260	64

== Honours ==
Napredak Kruševac

- Serbian First League: 2012–13

Red Star Belgrade

- Serbian SuperLiga: 2015–16

Individual

- Serbian SuperLiga Player of the Week: 2020–21 (Round 38)
