= 2020 FC Zhetysu season =

FC Zhetysu
2020 season
- Chairman: Zheksenbai Kusainov
- Manager: Dmitry Ogai
- Stadium: Zhetysu Stadium
- Kazakhstan Premier League: 6th
- Kazakhstan Cup: Canceled due to the COVID-19 pandemic
- Top goalscorer: League: Aybar Zhaksylykov (6); All: Aybar Zhaksylykov (6)
Home colours	Away colours

The 2020 FC Zhetysu season was the club's third season back in the Kazakhstan Premier League following their relegation at the end of the 2016 season, and 23rd season in total.

== Season events ==
On 13 March, the Football Federation of Kazakhstan announced all league fixtures would be played behind closed doors for the foreseeable future due to the COVID-19 pandemic. On 16 March the Football Federation of Kazakhstan suspended all football until 15 April.

On 26 July, it was announced that the league would resume on 1 July, with no fans being permitted to watch the games. The league was suspended for a second time on 3 July, for an initial two weeks, due to an increase in COVID-19 cases in the country.

== Squad ==
As of match played 30 November 2020

No.	Name	Nationality	Position	Date of birth (age)	Signed from	Signed in	Contract ends	Apps.	Goals
Goalkeepers
1	Andrey Shabanov	(Kazakhstan)	GK	17 November 1986 (aged 34)	Atyrau	2015			
36	Valeriy Kaznacheev	(Kazakhstan)	GK	24 February 2000 (aged 20)	Kairat	2020		0	0
70	Almat Bekbaev	(Kazakhstan)	GK	14 June 1984 (aged 36)	Irtysh Pavlodar	2018		43	0
Defenders
3	Andrey Lebedzew	(Belarus)	DF	1 February 1991 (aged 29)	Dynamo Brest	2018		37	0
5	Rauan Orynbasar	(Kazakhstan)	DF	1 March 1998 (aged 22)	Youth Team	2018		1	0
13	Yermek Kuantayev	(Kazakhstan)	DF	13 October 1990 (aged 30)	Kairat	2019		59	0
22	Stefan Živković	(Serbia)	DF	1 June 1990 (aged 30)	AEL	2020		17	0
23	Nikita Naumov	(Belarus)	DF	15 November 1989 (aged 31)	Vitebsk	2019		47	4
26	Olzhas Kerimzhanov	(Kazakhstan)	DF	16 May 1989 (aged 31)	Okzhetpes	2017			
30	Miram Sapanov	(Kazakhstan)	DF	12 March 1986 (aged 34)	Akzhayik	2019		32	0
31	Andrey Zaleski	(Belarus)	DF	20 January 1991 (aged 29)	Dinamo Minsk	2020		14	1
46	Yeskendir Kybyray	(Kazakhstan)	DF	14 August 1997 (aged 23)	Kairat	2019		8	0
Midfielders
8	Aslan Darabayev	(Kazakhstan)	MF	21 January 1989 (aged 31)	Irtysh Pavlodar	2019		34	3
10	Donjet Shkodra	(Kosovo)	MF	30 April 1989 (aged 31)	Shakhter Karagandy	2020		17	2
14	David Mawutor	(Ghana)	MF	12 April 1992 (aged 28)	Istiklol	2018		79	3
21	Nenad Adamović	(Serbia)	MF	12 January 1989 (aged 31)	Vitebsk	2019		51	6
33	Pedro Eugénio	(Portugal)	MF	26 June 1990 (aged 30)	Beroe Stara Zagora	2020		18	5
44	Artūras Žulpa	(Lithuania)	MF	10 June 1990 (aged 30)	Tobol	2020		14	1
77	Almir Mukhutdinov	(Kazakhstan)	MF	9 June 1985 (aged 35)	Tobol	2018		44	1
78	Alinur Yunashev	(Kazakhstan)	MF	1 June 2000 (aged 20)	Youth Team	2020		0	0
88	Madi Hasein	(Kazakhstan)	MF	26 May 1999 (aged 21)	Youth Team	2020		1	0
Forwards
7	Yerkebulan Seydakhmet	(Kazakhstan)	FW	4 February 2000 (aged 20)	loan from Kairat	2020		6	0
9	Aybar Zhaksylykov	(Kazakhstan)	FW	16 January 1993 (aged 27)	Youth Team	2019		40	12
11	Vadim Pobudey	(Belarus)	FW	17 December 1994 (aged 25)	Dnyapro Mogilev	2020		14	1
17	Yahor Zubovich	(Belarus)	FW	1 June 1989 (aged 31)	Dinamo Minsk	2020		19	1
29	Dias Kalybayev	(Kazakhstan)	FW	25 August 1999 (aged 21)	Youth Team	2020		1	0
90	Martin Toshev	(Bulgaria)	FW	15 August 1990 (aged 30)	CSKA 1948 Sofia	2019		29	13
Players away on loan
Left during the season
6	Georgi Pashov	(Bulgaria)	DF	4 March 1990 (aged 30)	Ararat-Armenia	2020		0	0
7	Elzhas Altynbekov	(Kazakhstan)	FW	22 November 1993 (aged 27)	Kaisar	2018		46	7

== Transfers ==
=== In ===
Date	Position	Nationality	Name	From	Fee	Ref.
Winter 2020	GK	(Kazakhstan)	Valeriy Kaznacheev	Kairat	Undisclosed	
Winter 2020	DF	(Armenia)	Hayk Ishkhanyan	Alashkert	Free	
Winter 2020	DF	(Belarus)	Andrey Zaleski	Dinamo Minsk	Undisclosed	
Winter 2020	DF	(Serbia)	Stefan Živković	AEL	Undisclosed	
Winter 2020	MF	(Kosovo)	Donjet Shkodra	Shakhter Karagandy	Undisclosed	
Winter 2020	MF	(Lithuania)	Artūras Žulpa	Tobol	Free	
Winter 2020	MF	(Portugal)	Pedro Eugénio	Beroe Stara Zagora	Undisclosed	
Winter 2020	FW	(Belarus)	Vadim Pobudey	Dnyapro Mogilev	Undisclosed	
Winter 2020	FW	(Belarus)	Yahor Zubovich	Dinamo Minsk	Undisclosed	
26 January 2020	DF	(Bulgaria)	Georgi Pashov	Ararat-Armenia	Free	

=== Loans in ===
Date from	Position	Nationality	Name	From	Date to	Ref.
6 August 2020	FW	(Kazakhstan)	Yerkebulan Seydakhmet	Kairat	End of season	

=== Released ===
Date	Position	Nationality	Name	Joined	Date	Ref.
Winter 2020	DF	(Armenia)	Hayk Ishkhanyan	Alashkert	4 March 2020	
30 June 2020	DF	(Bulgaria)	Georgi Pashov	Academica Clinceni	12 August 2020	
30 June 2020	FW	(Kazakhstan)	Elzhas Altynbekov	Kaisar	28 July 2020	
31 December 2020	GK	(Kazakhstan)	Almat Bekbaev	Kyzylzhar	9 March 2021	
31 December 2020	GK	(Kazakhstan)	Vleri Kaznacheev			
31 December 2020	DF	(Belarus)	Andrey Lebedzew	Vitebsk		
31 December 2020	DF	(Belarus)	Nikita Naumov	Dinamo Minsk		
31 December 2020	DF	(Belarus)	Andrey Zaleski	Turan	8 March 2021	
31 December 2020	DF	(Kazakhstan)	Olzhas Kerimzhanov	Turan		
31 December 2020	DF	(Kazakhstan)	Madi Khaseyn			
31 December 2020	DF	(Kazakhstan)	Yermek Kuantayev			
31 December 2020	DF	(Kazakhstan)	Yeskendir Kybyray	Shakhter Karagandy	28 February 2021	
31 December 2020	DF	(Kazakhstan)	Miram Sapanov	Akzhayik	19 February 2021	
31 December 2020	DF	(Serbia)	Stefan Živković	Turan	8 March 2021	
31 December 2020	MF	(Ghana)	David Mawutor	Wisła Kraków	21 February 2021	
31 December 2020	MF	(Kazakhstan)	Aslan Darabayev	Caspiy	26 February 2021	
31 December 2020	MF	(Kazakhstan)	Almir Mukhutdinov			
31 December 2020	MF	(Kazakhstan)	Alinur Yunashev			
31 December 2020	MF	(Kosovo)	Donjet Shkodra	Atyrau		
31 December 2020	MF	(Lithuania)	Artūras Žulpa	Siena		
31 December 2020	MF	(Portugal)	Pedro Eugénio	Taraz	20 February 2021	
31 December 2020	MF	(Serbia)	Nenad Adamović	Taraz	20 February 2021	
31 December 2020	FW	(Belarus)	Vadim Pobudey	Gomel		
31 December 2020	FW	(Belarus)	Yahor Zubovich	Neman Grodno		
31 December 2020	FW	(Bulgaria)	Martin Toshev	Academica Clinceni		

== Friendlies ==
2020	Zhetysu (Kazakhstan)	–
(UTC+6)

== Competitions ==
=== Premier League ===
==== Results summary ====
Overall								Home						Away					
Pld	W	D	L	GF	GA	GD	Pts	W	D	L	GF	GA	GD	W	D	L	GF	GA	GD
20	9	1	10	27	28	−1	28	5	1	4	18	13	+5	4	0	6	9	15	−6

Last updated: 30 November 2020.
Source: See Results

==== Results by round ====
Round	1	2	3	4	5	6	7	8	9	10	11	12	13	14	15	16	17	18	19	20	21	22
Ground	A	H	A	H	A	H	-	H	A	H	A	A	H	A	H	A	-	A	H	A	H	H
Result	W	D	L	L	L	W	-	W	W	W	L	L	L	L	W	L	-	W	L	W	L	W
Position	3	4	8	8	8	7	-	7	5	5	5	7	7	7	6	7	-	6	7	6	6	6

Source: See Results
A = Away; H = Home; W = Win; D = Draw; L = Loss

==== Results ====
8 March 2020 1	Caspiy	0 – 2	Zhetysu	Aktau
17:00 (UTC+6)	Adams (yellow card) 52'; Bondarenko (yellow card) 77'	Report	Toshev 66'; Shkodra (yellow card) 77'; Živković (yellow card) 82'; Zubovich 83'	Stadium: Zhastar Stadium; Attendance: 3,200; Referee: Saken Bayimbet

14 March 2020 2	Zhetysu	0 – 0	Tobol	Taldıqorğan
15:00 (UTC+6)		Report	Zarandia (yellow card) 39'	Stadium: Zhetysu Stadium; Attendance: 0 Referee: Askhat Abdanbayev
Note: Match played behind closed doors due to the COVID-19 pandemic.

1 July 2020 3	Kairat	3 – 0	Zhetysu	Almaty
18:00 (UTC+6)	Hovhannisyan 11'; Mikanović (yellow card) 16'; Góralski (yellow card) 42'; Wrzesiński 56'; A.Shushenachev 90+1'	Report	M.Sapanov (yellow card) 66'	Stadium: Central Stadium; Attendance: 0 Referee: Anatolyi Vishnichenko
Note: Match originally scheduled for 20 March, but postponed on 16 March due to the COVID-19 pandemic. Match played behind closed doors due to the COVID-19 pandemic.

18 August 2020 4	Zhetysu	2 – 3	Ordabasy	Almaty
19:00 (UTC+6)	Eugénio 22'; Toshev 28'; Kuantayev (yellow card) 36'; Mawutor (yellow card) 38'	Report	Khizhnichenko (yellow card) 14' (goal) 54'; Fontanello (yellow card) 34'; Simčević 39'; Mahlangu (yellow card) 50'; João Paulo 63'; B.Shayzada (yellow card) 90+2'	Stadium: Ortalıq Stadium; Attendance: 0 Referee: Artyom Kuchin
Note: Match originally scheduled for 3 April and then 4 July, but postponed twice due to the COVID-19 pandemic. Match played at the Ortalıq Stadium in Almaty, instead of Zhetysu's regular Zhetysu Stadium in Taldıqorğan. Match played behind closed doors due to the COVID-19 pandemic.

22 August 2020 5	Kaisar	1 – 0	Zhetysu	Almaty
18:00 (UTC+6)	Tagybergen (yellow card) 14'; Narzildaev (yellow card) 24'; Lobjanidze 75'; Bitang (yellow card) 84'	Report	Mawutor (yellow card) 35'	Stadium: T.S.Segïzbaeva Academy Stadium; Referee: Timur Kumashev
Note: Match originally scheduled for 11 April and then 10 July, but postponed twice due to the COVID-19 pandemic. Match played at the T.S.Segïzbaeva Academy Stadium in Almaty, instead of Shakhter Karagandy's regular Gani Muratbayev Stadium in Kyzylorda. Match played behind closed doors due to the COVID-19 pandemic.

27 August 2020 6	Zhetysu	3 – 0	Kyzylzhar	Talgar
16:00 (UTC+6)	Lobantsev 5' (o.g.); Toshev 41'; Shkodra 68'	Report	Gubanov (yellow card) 53'; Delić (yellow card) 90+1'	Stadium: UTB Talgar Stadium; Attendance: 0 Referee: Artyom Kuchin
Note: Match played at the UTB Talgar Stadium in Talgar, instead of Zhetysu's regular Zhetysu Stadium in Taldıqorğan. Match played behind closed doors due to the COVID-19 pandemic.

11 September 2020 8	Zhetysu	1 – 0	Okzhetpes	Talgar
16:00 (UTC+6)	Kerimzhanov 44'; Shkodra (yellow card) 85'	Report	Obradović (yellow card) 64'; A.Saparov (yellow card) 84'	Stadium: UTB Talgar Stadium; Attendance: 0 Referee: Aleksandr Gauzer
Note: Match played at the UTB Talgar Stadium in Talgar, instead of Zhetysu's regular Zhetysu Stadium in Taldıqorğan. Match played behind closed doors due to the COVID-19 pandemic.

19 September 2020 9	Taraz	0 – 2	Zhetysu	Talgar
16:00 (UTC+6)	D.Babakhanov (yellow card) 14'; Turysbek (yellow card) 36'; A.Suley (yellow card) 38'; Batsuyev (yellow card) 79'; Punoševac (yellow card) 85'	Report	Eugénio 14' (pen.); Shkodra (yellow card) 26' (goal) 41' (pen.); Kerimzhanov (yellow card) 34'; Naumov (yellow card) 89'	Stadium: UTB Talgar; Attendance: 0 Referee: Arman Ismuratov
Note: Match played at the UTB Talgar stadium in Talgar, instead of Taraz's regular Central Stadium in Taraz. Match played behind closed doors due to the COVID-19 pandemic.

24 September 2020 10	Zhetysu	3 – 2	Shakhter Karagandy	Almaty
13:30 (UTC+6)	Živković (yellow card) 20'; Naumov (yellow card) 26'; Darabayev (yellow card) 42'; Kerimzhanov (yellow card) 64'; Zhaksylykov 70', 83' (yellow card) 85'; Eugénio 84' (yellow card) 85'; Zubovich (yellow card) 90+1'	Report	Usman (yellow card) 12'; Mingazow 25'; A.Tattybaev (yellow card) 43'; Khubulov (yellow card) 45'; Lamanje 53'; Y.Tapalov (yellow card) 59'; Buyvolov (yellow card) 75'	Stadium: T.S.Segïzbaeva Academy Stadium; Attendance: 0 Referee: Anatolyi Vishnichenko
Note: Match played at the T.S.Segïzbaeva Academy Stadium in Almaty, instead of Zhetysu's regular Zhetysu Stadium in Taldıqorğan. Match played behind closed doors due to the COVID-19 pandemic.

27 September 2020 11	Astana	3 – 0	Zhetysu	Almaty
18:15 (UTC+6)	Ebong (yellow card) 29'; Tomašević 39', 65'; Sigurjónsson (yellow card) 68'; Beisebekov 78'; Shchotkin (yellow card) 82'	Report	Mawutor (yellow card) 62'; Zhaksylykov (yellow card) 76'	Stadium: Central Stadium; Attendance: 0 Referee: Bakhyt Kyzylbaev
Note: Match played at the Central Stadium in Almaty, instead of Astana's regular Astana Arena in Nur-Sultan. Match played behind closed doors due to the COVID-19 pandemic.

2 October 2020 12	Tobol	2 – 0	Zhetsyu	Almaty
19:00 (UTC+6)	Amanović (yellow card) 34'; Abilgazy (yellow card) 47'; Kankava 53'; Manzorro 59'; Valiullin (yellow card) 66'; Sebai (yellow card) 82'	Report	Naumov (yellow card) 5'; Kerimzhanov (yellow card) 82'	Stadium: Jas Qyran Stadium; Attendance: 0 Referee: Igor Chesnokov
Note: Match played at the Jas Qyran Stadium in Almaty, instead of Tobol's regular Central Stadium in Kostanay. Match played behind closed doors due to the COVID-19 pandemic.

18 October 2020 13	Zhetysu	2 – 4	Kairat	Almaty
17:00 (UTC+6)	Eugénio 6'; Suyumbayev 17' (o.g.); M.Sapanov (yellow card) 28' (yellow-red card) 59'; Mawutor (yellow card) 49'; Darabayev (yellow card) 89' (yellow-red card) 90+3'	Report	Aimbetov 30', 56'; Palyakow 75'; Góralski (yellow card) 80'; Usenov 90+4'	Stadium: Jas Qyran Stadium; Attendance: 0 Referee: Bolat Saryev
Note: Match played at the Jas Qyran Stadium in Almaty, instead of Zhetysu's regular Zhetysu Stadium in Taldıqorğan. Match played behind closed doors due to the COVID-19 pandemic.

22 October 2020 14	Ordabasy	3 – 1	Zhetysu	Talgar
15:00 (UTC+6)	Fontanello 7' (yellow card) 49'; Diakate 18'; Dmitrenko (yellow card) 45+2'; Brígido 66'; Astanov (yellow card) 85'	Report	Naumov (yellow card) 21'; Zhaksylykov 73'	Stadium: UTB Talgar Stadium; Attendance: 0 Referee: Aleksandr Gauzer
Note: Match played at the UTB Talgar Stadium in Talgar, instead of Ordabasy's regular Kazhymukan Munaitpasov Stadium in Shymkent. Match played behind closed doors due to the COVID-19 pandemic.

26 October 2020 15	Zhetysu	3 – 1	Kaisar	Almaty
13:00 (UTC+6)	Darabayev 29'; M.Sapanov (yellow card) 54'; Mawutor 71'; Zhaksylykov 80'	Report	Stanisavljević (yellow card) 21'; Kolev (red card) 41'; Fortes 48'; Graf (yellow card) 70'; S.Abzalov (yellow card) 89'	Stadium: T.S.Segïzbaeva Academy Stadium; Attendance: 0 Referee: Georgiy Chekhovskiy
Note: Match played at the T.S.Segïzbaeva Academy Stadium in Almaty, instead of Zhetysu's regular Zhetysu Stadium in Taldıqorğan. Match played behind closed doors due to the COVID-19 pandemic.

31 October 2020 16	Kyzylzhar	2 – 1	Zhetysu	Almaty
17:00 (UTC+6)	T.Muldinov 36'; Drachenko 45+1'; Plătică (yellow card) 64'; A.Kasym (yellow card) 85'; Lobantsev (yellow card) 90'	Report	Darabayev (yellow card) 36'; Zaleski (yellow card) 45+1'; Žulpa 52'; Zhaksylykov (red card) 86'	Stadium: Jas Qyran Stadium; Attendance: 0 Referee: Arman Ismuratov
Note: Match played at the Jas Qyran Stadium in Almaty, instead of Kyzylzhar's regular Karasai Stadium in Petropavl. Match played behind closed doors due to the COVID-19 pandemic.

8 November 2020 18	Okzhetpes	0 – 1	Zhetysu	Almaty
17:00 (UTC+6)	S.Zhumakhanov (yellow card) 25'; Hawrylovich (yellow card) 60' (yellow-red card) 86'; Moldakaraev (yellow card) 74'; Dimov (yellow card) 81'	Report	Adamović 21'; A.Shabanov (yellow card) 24'; Y.Kybyray (yellow card) 43'; Shkodra (yellow card) 47'; Kuantayev (yellow card) 90+2'; Pobudey (yellow card) 90+5'	Stadium: Jas Qyran Stadium; Attendance: 0 Referee: Aydin Rakhimbayev
Note: Match played at the Jas Qyran Stadium in Almaty, instead of Okzhetpes's regular Okzhetpes Stadium in Kokshetau. Match played behind closed doors due to the COVID-19 pandemic.

21 November 2020 19	Zhetysu	0 – 1	Taraz	Talgar
14:00 (UTC+6)	Mawutor (yellow card) 64'; Žulpa (yellow card) 72'; Toshev (yellow card) 84'; Adamović (yellow card) 90+1'	Report	D.Evstingeyev (yellow card) 9'; Boljević 28'; M.Amirkhanov (yellow card) 44'	Stadium: UTB Talgar; Attendance: 0 Referee: Sergey Gorokhovodatskiy
Note: Match played at the UTB Talgar stadium in Talgar, instead of Zhetysu's regular Zhetysu Stadium in Taldıqorğan. Match played behind closed doors due to the COVID-19 pandemic.

24 November 2020 20	Shakhter Karagandy	1 – 2	Zhetysu	Almaty
18:00 (UTC+6)	A.Tattybaev 79'	Report	Toshev 24'; Mawutor (yellow card) 66'; Eugénio 74'	Stadium: Central Stadium; Attendance: 0 Referee: Bakhyt Kyzylbaev
Note: Match played at the Central Stadium in Almaty, instead of Shakhter Karagandy's regular Shakhter Stadium in Karaganda. Match played behind closed doors due to the COVID-19 pandemic.

27 November 2020 21	Zhetysu	1 – 2	Astana	Almaty
13:00 (UTC+6)	Zaleski 4'; Eugénio (yellow card) 61'; Pobudey (yellow card) 69'	Report	Tomasov 61'; Sotiriou 81'	Stadium: Jas Qyran Stadium; Attendance: 0 Referee: Aleksandr Gauzer
Note: Match played at the Jas Qyran Stadium in Almaty, instead of Zhetysu's regular Zhetysu Stadium in Taldıqorğan. Match played behind closed doors due to the COVID-19 pandemic.

30 November 2020 22	Zhetysu	3 – 0	Caspiy	Almaty
18:00 (UTC+6)	Zhaksylykov 23', 58'; Pobudey 33'; Zubovich (yellow card) 50'	Report	Shestakov (yellow card) 53'	Stadium: Central Stadium; Attendance: 0 Referee: Igor Chesnokov
Note: Match played at the Central Stadium in Almaty, instead of Zhetysu's regular Zhetysu Stadium in Taldıqorğan. Match played behind closed doors due to the COVID-19 pandemic.

==== League table ====
Pos	Team	Pld	W	D	L	GF	GA	GD	Pts	Qualification or relegation
4	Shakhter Karagandy	20	9	5	6	29	22	+7	32	Qualification for the Europa Conference League second qualifying round
5	Ordabasy	20	9	4	7	27	26	+1	31	
6	Zhetysu	20	9	1	10	27	28	−1	28	
7	Kaisar	20	6	6	8	20	23	−3	24	
8	Taraz	20	5	8	7	19	23	−4	23	

Source: UEFA, Soccerway
Rules for classification: 1) Points; 2) Goal difference; 3) Matches won; 4) Goals scored; 5) Away goals scored; 6) Head-to-head points; 7) Head-to-head matches won; 8) Head-to-head goal difference; 9) Head-to-head goals scored; 10) Head-to-head away goals scored; 11) Draw.

=== Kazakhstan Cup ===
July 2020 Last 16	–
(UTC+6)

== Squad statistics ==
As of match played 30 November 2020

=== Appearances and goals ===
No.	Pos	Nat	Player	Total		Premier League		Kazakhstan Cup	
No.	Pos	Nat	Player	Apps	Goals	Apps	Goals	Apps	Goals
1	GK	(Kazakhstan) KAZ	Andrey Shabanov	11	0	11	0	0	0
3	DF	(Belarus) BLR	Andrey Lebedzew	5	0	3+2	0	0	0
5	DF	(Kazakhstan) KAZ	Rauan Orynbasar	1	0	1	0	0	0
7	FW	(Kazakhstan) KAZ	Yerkebulan Seydakhmet	6	0	2+4	0	0	0
8	MF	(Kazakhstan) KAZ	Aslan Darabayev	17	1	12+5	1	0	0
9	FW	(Kazakhstan) KAZ	Aybar Zhaksylykov	16	6	5+11	6	0	0
10	MF	(Kosovo) KOS	Donjet Shkodra	17	2	17	2	0	0
11	FW	(Belarus) BLR	Vadim Pobudey	14	1	7+7	1	0	0
13	DF	(Kazakhstan) KAZ	Yermek Kuantayev	11	0	4+7	0	0	0
14	MF	(Ghana) GHA	David Mawutor	18	1	16+2	1	0	0
17	FW	(Belarus) BLR	Yahor Zubovich	19	1	4+15	1	0	0
21	MF	(Serbia) SRB	Nenad Adamović	20	1	16+4	1	0	0
22	DF	(Serbia) SRB	Stefan Živković	17	0	16+1	0	0	0
23	DF	(Belarus) BLR	Nikita Naumov	17	0	17	0	0	0
26	DF	(Kazakhstan) KAZ	Olzhas Kerimzhanov	13	1	13	1	0	0
29	FW	(Kazakhstan) KAZ	Dias Kalybayev	1	0	0+1	0	0	0
30	DF	(Kazakhstan) KAZ	Miram Sapanov	13	0	10+3	0	0	0
31	DF	(Belarus) BLR	Andrey Zaleski	14	1	12+2	1	0	0
33	MF	(Portugal) POR	Pedro Eugénio	18	5	16+2	5	0	0
44	MF	(Lithuania) LTU	Artūras Žulpa	14	1	10+4	1	0	0
46	DF	(Kazakhstan) KAZ	Yeskendir Kybyray	8	0	5+3	0	0	0
70	GK	(Kazakhstan) KAZ	Almat Bekbaev	10	0	9+1	0	0	0
77	MF	(Kazakhstan) KAZ	Almir Mukhutdinov	2	0	1+1	0	0	0
88	MF	(Kazakhstan) KAZ	Madi Hasein	1	0	0+1	0	0	0
90	FW	(Bulgaria) BUL	Martin Toshev	15	4	12+3	4	0	0
Players away from Zhetysu on loan:
Players who left Zhetysu during the season:

=== Goal scorers ===
Place	Position	Nation	Number	Name	Premier League	Kazakhstan Cup	Total
1	FW	(Kazakhstan)	9	Aybar Zhaksylykov	6	0	6
2	MF	(Portugal)	33	Pedro Eugénio	5	0	5
3	FW	(Bulgaria)	90	Martin Toshev	4	0	4
4	MF	(Kosovo)	10	Donjet Shkodra	2	0	2
4				Own goal	2	0	2
6	FW	(Belarus)	17	Yahor Zubovich	1	0	1
6	DF	(Kazakhstan)	26	Olzhas Kerimzhanov	1	0	1
6	MF	(Kazakhstan)	8	Aslan Darabayev	1	0	1
6	MF	(Ghana)	14	David Mawutor	1	0	1
6	MF	(Lithuania)	44	Artūras Žulpa	1	0	1
6	MF	(Serbia)	21	Nenad Adamović	1	0	1
6	DF	(Belarus)	31	Andrey Zaleski	1	0	1
6	FW	(Belarus)	11	Vadim Pobudey	1	0	1
				TOTALS	27	0	27

=== Clean sheet ===
Place	Position	Nation	Number	Name	Premier League	Kazakhstan Cup	Total
1	GK	(Kazakhstan)	1	Andrey Shabanov	4	0	4
1	GK	(Kazakhstan)	70	Almat Bekbaev	4	0	4
				TOTALS	8	0	8

Shabanov & Bekbaev both played in Zhetysu's 1-0 victory over Okzhetpes on 8 November 2020

=== Disciplinary record ===
Number	Nation	Position	Name	Premier League		Kazakhstan Cup		Total	
Number	Nation	Position	Name	Booked	Sent off (straight red)	Booked	Sent off (straight red)	Booked	Sent off (straight red)
1	(Kazakhstan)	GK	Andrey Shabanov	1	0	0	0	1	0
8	(Kazakhstan)	MF	Aslan Darabayev	4	1	0	0	4	1
9	(Kazakhstan)	FW	Aybar Zhaksylykov	2	1	0	0	2	1
10	(Kosovo)	MF	Donjet Shkodra	4	0	0	0	4	0
11	(Belarus)	FW	Vadim Pobudey	2	0	0	0	2	0
13	(Kazakhstan)	DF	Yermek Kuantayev	2	0	0	0	2	0
14	(Ghana)	MF	David Mawutor	6	0	0	0	6	0
17	(Belarus)	FW	Yahor Zubovich	2	0	0	0	2	0
21	(Serbia)	MF	Nenad Adamović	1	0	0	0	1	0
22	(Serbia)	DF	Stefan Živković	2	0	0	0	2	0
23	(Belarus)	DF	Nikita Naumov	4	0	0	0	4	0
26	(Kazakhstan)	DF	Olzhas Kerimzhanov	3	0	0	0	3	0
30	(Kazakhstan)	DF	Miram Sapanov	4	1	0	0	4	1
31	(Belarus)	DF	Andrey Zaleski	1	0	0	0	1	0
33	(Portugal)	MF	Pedro Eugénio	2	0	0	0	2	0
44	(Lithuania)	MF	Artūras Žulpa	1	0	0	0	1	0
46	(Kazakhstan)	DF	Yeskendir Kybyray	1	0	0	0	1	0
90	(Bulgaria)	FW	Martin Toshev	1	0	0	0	1	0
Players away on loan:
Players who left Zhetysu during the season:
			TOTALS	43	3	0	0	43	3
