= 2019 FC Zhetysu season =

FC Zhetysu
2019 season
- Chairman: Zheksenbai Kusainov
- Manager: Dmitry Ogai
- Stadium: Zhetysu Stadium
- Kazakhstan Premier League: 5th
- Kazakhstan Cup: Last 16
- Top goalscorer: League: Martin Toshev (9); All: Martin Toshev (9)
Home colours	Away colours

The 2019 FC Zhetysu season was the club's second season back in the Kazakhstan Premier League following their relegation at the end of the 2016 season, and 22nd season in total. Zhetysu finished the season in 5th position, whilst being knockout out of the Kazakhstan Cup at the Last 16 stage by Atyrau.

== Squad ==
As of match played 10 November 2019

No.	Name	Nationality	Position	Date of birth (age)	Signed from	Signed in	Contract ends	Apps.	Goals
Goalkeepers
1	Andrey Shabanov	(Kazakhstan)	GK	17 November 1986 (age 39)	Atyrau	2015			
25	Dmitry Kolbuntsov	(Kazakhstan)	GK	25 May 1996 (age 30)	Altai Semey	2017			
70	Almat Bekbaev	(Kazakhstan)	GK	14 June 1984 (age 42)	Zhetysu	2018		33	0
89	Nurlybek Ayazbaev	(Kazakhstan)	GK	24 January 1991 (age 35)	Caspiy	2018		8	0
Defenders
2	Maxim Chalkin	(Kazakhstan)	DF	9 March 1996 (age 30)	Youth Team				
3	Andrey Lebedzew	(Belarus)	DF	1 February 1991 (age 35)	Dynamo Brest	2018		32	0
4	Andrei Kharabara	(Russia)	DF	1 September 1985 (age 41)	Rudansky	2017			
13	Yermek Kuantayev	(Kazakhstan)	DF	13 October 1990 (age 36)	Kairat	2019		48	0
23	Nikita Naumov	(Belarus)	DF	15 November 1989 (age 36)	Vitebsk	2019		30	4
26	Olzhas Kerimzhanov	(Kazakhstan)	DF	16 May 1989 (age 37)	Okzhetpes	2017			
28	Miram Sapanov	(Kazakhstan)	DF	12 March 1986 (age 40)	Akzhayik	2019		19	0
98	Ruan Orynbasar	(Kazakhstan)	DF	1 March 1998 (age 28)	Youth Team	2016			
Midfielders
5	Kamo Hovhannisyan	(Armenia)	MF	5 October 1992 (age 34)	Torpedo-BelAZ Zhodino	2018		58	6
8	Aslan Darabayev	(Kazakhstan)	MF	21 January 1989 (age 37)	Irtysh Pavlodar	2019		17	2
10	Raul Jalilov	(Kyrgyzstan)	MF	20 July 1994 (age 32)	Tobol	2018		33	3
11	Sabyrkhan Ibraev	(Kazakhstan)	MF	22 March 1988 (age 38)	Makhtaaral	2017			
12	Yerkin Tapalov	(Kazakhstan)	MF	3 September 1993 (age 33)	Akzhayik	2019		22	0
14	David Mawutor	(Ghana)	MF	12 April 1992 (age 34)	Istiklol	2018		61	2
21	Nenad Adamović	(Serbia)	MF	12 January 1989 (age 37)	Vitebsk	2019		31	5
77	Almir Mukhutdinov	(Kazakhstan)	MF	9 June 1985 (age 41)	Tobol	2018		42	1
88	Mantas Kuklys	(Lithuania)	MF	10 August 1987 (age 39)	Žalgiris	2018		55	7
	Ablaykhan Makhambetov	(Kazakhstan)	MF	3 August 1991 (age 35)	Kyran	2019		5	1
Forwards
7	Elzhas Altynbekov	(Kazakhstan)	FW	22 November 1993 (age 32)	Kaisar	2018		46	7
9	Aybar Zhaksylykov	(Kazakhstan)	FW	16 January 1993 (age 33)	Youth Team	2019		24	6
18	Rifat Nurmugamet	(Kazakhstan)	FW	22 May 1996 (age 30)	loan from Kairat	2019	2019		
27	Ruslan Stepanyuk	(Ukraine)	FW	16 January 1992 (age 34)	Veres Rivne	2018		44	8
33	Oleg Hromțov	(Moldova)	FW	30 May 1983 (age 43)	Kaisar	2017			
90	Martin Toshev	(Bulgaria)	FW	15 August 1990 (age 36)	CSKA 1948 Sofia	2019		14	9
Players away on loan
Left during the season
96	Ivan Antipov	(Kazakhstan)	MF	14 January 1996 (age 30)	Akzhayik	2019		6	0
99	Ivaylo Dimitrov	(Bulgaria)	FW	26 March 1989 (age 37)	loan from Ararat-Armenia	2019		6	0

== Transfers ==
=== In ===
Date	Position	Nationality	Name	From	Fee	Ref.
	DF	(Belarus)	Nikita Naumov	Vitebsk	Undisclosed	
	DF	(Kazakhstan)	Yermek Kuantayev	Kairat	Undisclosed	
	DF	(Kazakhstan)	Miram Sapanov	Akzhayik	Undisclosed	
	MF	(Kazakhstan)	Ivan Antipov	Akzhayik	Undisclosed	
	MF	(Kazakhstan)	Ablaykhan Makhambetov	Kyran	Undisclosed	
	MF	(Serbia)	Nenad Adamović	Vitebsk	Undisclosed	
26 June 2019	MF	(Kazakhstan)	Aslan Darabayev	Irtysh Pavlodar	Free	
Summer 2019	FW	(Bulgaria)	Martin Toshev	CSKA 1948 Sofia	Undisclosed	

=== Out ===
Date	Position	Nationality	Name	To	Fee	Ref.
19 July 2019	MF	(Kazakhstan)	Ivan Antipov	Atyrau	Undisclosed	

=== Loans in ===
Date from	Position	Nationality	Name	From	Date to	Ref.
22 February 2019	FW	(Bulgaria)	Ivaylo Dimitrov	Ararat-Armenia	Summer 2019	
12 July 2019	FW	(Kazakhstan)	Rifat Nurmugamet	Kairat	End of season	

=== Released ===
Date	Position	Nationality	Name	Joined	Date	Ref.
31 December 2019	GK	(Kazakhstan)	Nurlybek Ayazbaev	Caspiy		
31 December 2019	DF	(Belarus)	Ivan Sadownichy	Kaisar		
31 December 2019	DF	(Georgia (country))	Lasha Kasradze	Taraz	28 January 2019	
31 December 2019	DF	(Kazakhstan)	Temirlan Adilkhanov			
31 December 2019	DF	(Kazakhstan)	Serik Sagyndykov			
31 December 2019	MF	(Armenia)	Edgar Malakyan	Petrolul Ploiești	27 January 2019	
31 December 2019	MF	(Kazakhstan)	Zhakyp Kozhamberdi	Taraz		
31 December 2019	MF	(Uzbekistan)	Server Djeparov	Metallurg Bekabad	16 January 2019	

=== Trial ===
Date From	Date To	Position	Nationality	Name	Last club	Ref.

== Competitions ==
=== Premier League ===
==== Results summary ====
Overall								Home						Away					
Pld	W	D	L	GF	GA	GD	Pts	W	D	L	GF	GA	GD	W	D	L	GF	GA	GD
33	16	8	9	45	25	+20	56	10	4	3	30	11	+19	6	4	6	15	14	+1

Last updated: 10 November 2019.
Source: See Results

==== Results by round ====
Round	1	2	3	4	5	6	7	8	9	10	11	12	13	14	15	16	17	18	19	20	21	22	23	24	25	26	27	28	29	30	31	32	33
Ground	H	A	H	A	H	A	H	A	H	A	H	H	A	H	A	A	A	H	A	H	A	A	H	A	H	A	H	A	H	A	H	A	H
Result	W	W	L	L	W	D	D	W	W	L	D	W	L	D	D	L	L	W	L	W	W	W	W	W	L	L	W	D	W	W	D	D	W
Position	1	2	5	5	5	5	5	4	3	4	6	6	6	6	6	6	6	6	7	6	6	6	5	5	5	5	5	5	5	5	5	5	5

Source: See Results
A = Away; H = Home; W = Win; D = Draw; L = Loss

==== Results ====
9 March 2019 1	Zhetysu	5 – 1	Okzhetpes	Taldıqorğan
15:00 (UTC+6)	A.Makhambetov 11' (yellow card) 53'; Naumov 15'; E.Altynbekov 31'; Adamović 79'; Zhaksylykov 87'	Report	Kasmynin (yellow card) 35' (yellow-red card) 61'; Alves (yellow card) 44'; Stojanović (yellow card) 53'; Moldakaraev 55'; T.Rudoselskiy (yellow card) 58'; S.Zhumakhanov (yellow card) 90'	Stadium: Zhetysu Stadium Reserve Field; Attendance: 1,000; Referee: Bagdat Abdullaev

15 March 2019 2	Kaisar	0 – 1	Zhetysu	Kyzylorda
16:00 (UTC+6)	Barseghyan (yellow card) 44'; I.Amirseitov (yellow card) 45+2'	Report	Naumov 20'; O.Kerimzhanov (yellow card) 86'	Stadium: Gani Muratbayev Stadium; Attendance: 1,500; Referee: Igor Chesnokov

30 March 2019 3	Zhetysu	0 – 2	Astana	Taldıqorğan
17:00 (UTC+6)		Report	Aničić 26'; Rotariu 58'; Pertsukh (yellow card) 90+2'	Stadium: Zhetysu Stadium; Attendance: 1,500; Referee: Saken Bayimbet

6 April 2019 4	Ordabasy	1 – 0	Zhetysu	Shymkent
16:00 (UTC+6)	João Paulo (yellow card) 57' (goal) 73'; Erlanov (yellow card) 85'	Report	E.Altynbekov (yellow card) 50'; Mukhutdinov (yellow card) 57'	Stadium: Kazhymukan Munaitpasov Stadium; Attendance: 5,000; Referee: Igor Chesnokov

14 April 2019 5	Zhetysu	3 – 0	Kairat	Taldıqorğan
16:00 (UTC+6)	E.Altynbekov (yellow card) 15'; Naumov 25' (yellow card) 90+5'; Hromțov 88'; Hovhannisyan 90+5'	Report	Eseola (yellow card) 2'; Palitsevich (yellow card) 50'; S.Keyler (yellow card) 56'; Pokatilov (yellow card) 85'; Dugalić (yellow card) 89'; Abiken (yellow card) 90+2'	Stadium: Zhetysu Stadium; Attendance: 2,000; Referee: Artyom Kuchin

20 April 2019 6	Tobol	0 – 0	Zhetysu	Kostanay
17:00 (UTC+6)		Report	Dimitrov (yellow card) 51'	Stadium: Central Stadium; Attendance: 3,000; Referee: Bakhyt Kyzylbaev

27 April 2019 7	Zhetysu	0 – 0	Atyrau	Taldıqorğan
17:00 (UTC+6)	Mukhutdinov (yellow card) 6'; E.Altynbekov (yellow card) 53'	Report	Ablitarov (yellow card) 53'; A.Shabaev (yellow card) 90+2'; V.Vomenko (yellow card) 90+4'	Stadium: Zhetysu Stadium; Attendance: 3,000; Referee: Aleksandr Gauzer

1 May 2019 8	Irtysh Pavlodar	0 – 3	Zhetysu	Pavlodar
18:00 (UTC+6)	Vitas (yellow card) 28'; Mirosavljev (yellow card) 69'; Paragulgov (yellow card) 75'	Report	E.Altynbekov 17', 58'; Naumov (yellow card) 45+4'; Hovhannisyan 68'	Stadium: Central Stadium; Attendance: 1,500; Referee: Aydin Rakhimbayev

5 May 2019 9	Zhetysu	1 – 0	Taraz	Taldıqorğan
17:00 (UTC+6)	E.Altynbekov 54'	Report		Stadium: Zhetysu Stadium; Attendance: 2,500; Referee: Denis Tevyashov

12 May 2019 10	Shakhter Karagandy	2 – 0	Zhetysu	Nur-Sultan
15:00 (UTC+6)	J.Payruz 2' (yellow card) 53'; Tkachuk (yellow card) 58'; Najaryan (yellow card) 70'; Pešić 86'	Report	Naumov (yellow card) 27'; O.Kerimzhanov (yellow card) 30' (yellow-red card) 59'; Adamović (yellow card) 76'; Zhaksylykov (yellow card) 90+3'	Stadium: Astana Arena; Attendance: 500; Referee: Zhandos Abzhan
Note: Match played at the Astana Arena instead of Shakhter's regular home ground, Shakhter Stadium.

18 May 2019 11	Zhetysu	1 – 1	Aktobe	Taldıqorğan
17:00 (UTC+6)	Zhaksylykov 44'; A.Shabanov (yellow card) 54'	Report	A.Shurigin (yellow card) 45+1'; Aimbetov 76'	Stadium: Zhetysu Stadium; Attendance: 2,000; Referee: Grigory Moskovchenko

26 May 2019 12	Zhetysu	1 – 0	Kaisar	Taldıqorğan
17:30 (UTC+6)	Hovhannisyan 52'; O.Kerimzhanov (yellow card) 79'	Report		Stadium: Zhetysu Stadium; Attendance: 2,000; Referee: Artyom Kuchin

31 May 2019 13	Astana	1 – 0	Zhetysu	Nur-Sultan
19:00 (UTC+6)	Postnikov 36' (yellow card) 80'; Rukavina (yellow card) 90'	Report	Adamović (yellow card) 51'; O.Kerimzhanov (yellow card) 74' (yellow-red card) 79'	Stadium: Astana Arena; Attendance: 1,500; Referee: Aydin Rakhimbayev

16 June 2019 14	Zhetysu	1 – 1	Ordabasy	Taldıqorğan
18:00 (UTC+6)	Mawutor (yellow card) 15'; Hovhannisyan 21'; M.Sapanov (yellow card) 39'; Lebedzew (yellow card) 74'	Report	João Paulo 16'; Diakate (yellow card) 25'	Stadium: Zhetysu Stadium; Attendance: 3,000; Referee: Timur Kumashev

23 June 2019 15	Kairat	0 – 0	Zhetysu	Almaty
19:00 (UTC+6)	Akhmetov (yellow card) 31'; Abiken (yellow card) 64'	Report		Stadium: Central Stadium; Attendance: 7,500; Referee: Aleksandr Gauzer

30 June 2019 16	Zhetysu	0 – 1	Tobol	Taldıqorğan
18:00 (UTC+6)	Zhaksylykov (yellow card) 48'; Stepanyuk (yellow card) 72'	Report	Kassaï 32' (yellow card) 45'; Sebai (yellow card) 78'	Stadium: Zhetysu Stadium; Attendance: 3,000; Referee: Bolat Saryev

6 July 2019 17	Atyrau	2 – 1	Zhetysu	Atyrau
20:00 (UTC+6)	Abdulavov 31'; A.Rodionov 63' (yellow card) 74'	Report	Darabayev 61' (yellow card) 90'; Mawutor (yellow card) 74'; Naumov (yellow card) 79'; Kuklys (yellow card) 90'	Stadium: Munaishy Stadium; Attendance: 4,500; Referee: Ruslan Omarov

13 July 2019 18	Zhetysu	4 – 0	Irtysh Pavlodar	Taldıqorğan
19:00 (UTC+6)	O.Kerimzhanov 29'; Y.Tapalov (yellow card) 41'; Adamović 45+3'; E.Altynbekov 47' (yellow card) 52'; Lebedzew (yellow card) 61'; Stepanyuk 75'	Report	R.Yesimov (yellow card) 63'; Manzorro (yellow card) 66'; S.Sagnayev (yellow card) 73'; A.Pasechenko (yellow card) 77'	Stadium: Zhetysu Stadium; Attendance: 2,500; Referee: Saken Bayimbet

21 July 2019 19	Taraz	2 – 0	Zhetysu	Taraz
19:30 (UTC+6)	R.Rozybakiev (yellow card) 18'; Elivelto 51' (pen.) (yellow card) 72' (yellow-red card) 90+2'; A.Taubay 90+4' (yellow card) 90+5'	Report	Naumov (yellow card) 90+2'	Stadium: Central Stadium; Attendance: 3,000; Referee: Daniyar Sakhi

27 July 2019 20	Zhetysu	2 – 0	Shakhter Karagandy	Taldıqorğan
19:00 (UTC+6)	Lebedzew (yellow card) 7'; Toshev 21', 28'; E.Altynbekov (yellow card) 55'; Adamović (yellow card) 60'	Report	N.Shugayev (yellow card) 12'; Kizito (yellow card) 19'; Zenjov (yellow card) 29'; Shakhmetov (yellow card) 63'	Stadium: Zhetysu Stadium; Attendance: 2,500; Referee: Askhat Abdanbayev

3 August 2019 21	Aktobe	1 – 2	Zhetysu	Aktobe
20:00 (UTC+6)	Aimbetov 90+3'	Report	Stepanyuk 10'; Toshev 53'	Stadium: Central Stadium; Attendance: 10,000; Referee: Bagdat Abdullaev

10 August 2019 22	Okzhetpes	0 – 1	Zhetysu	Kokshetau
17:00 (UTC+6)		Report	Toshev 4'; E.Altynbekov (yellow card) 59'; Kuklys (yellow card) 88'	Stadium: Okzhetpes Stadium; Attendance: 1,800; Referee: Anatolyi Vishnichenko

18 August 2019 23	Zhetysu	5 – 0	Aktobe	Taldıqorğan
18:00 (UTC+6)	Zhaksylykov 11', 65'; Hovhannisyan 30'; Kuklys 71' (pen.); Naumov 80'	Report		Stadium: Zhetysu Stadium; Attendance: 3,000; Referee: Denis Tevyashov

25 August 2019 24	Kaisar	0 – 2	Zhetysu	Kyzylorda
19:00 (UTC+6)	Narzildaev (yellow card) 27'; Barseghyan (yellow card) 77'	Report	Adamović 22'; Mawutor (yellow card) 26'; Darabayev (yellow card) 45+1'; Hovhannisyan (yellow card) 52'; Naumov (yellow card) 78'; Kuklys 80'	Stadium: Gani Muratbayev Stadium; Attendance: 3,000; Referee: Sergey Gorokhovodatskiy

31 August 2019 25	Zhetysu	0 – 1	Ordabasy	Taldıqorğan
16:00 (UTC+6)	Bekbaev (yellow card) 75'	Report	Mahlangu (yellow card) 11'; Diakate 23'; Zhangylyshbay (yellow card) 75'	Stadium: Zhetysu Stadium; Attendance: 3,000; Referee: Artyom Kuchin

15 September 2019 26	Kairat	4 – 1	Zhetysu	Almaty
19:00 (UTC+6)	Eseola 13', 80'; Suyumbayev 19'; Abiken (yellow card) 24'; Eppel 31' (yellow card) 57'; Zhukov (yellow card) 34'	Report	Zhaksylykov 59'; Stepanyuk (yellow card) 64'; Kuantayev (yellow card) 70'	Stadium: Central Stadium; Attendance: 4,000; Referee: Igor Chesnokov

22 September 2019 27	Zhetysu	2 – 1	Astana	Taldıqorğan
16:00 (UTC+6)	Toshev 80'; Zhaksylykov 89'	Report	Rotariu 8'; Sigurjónsson (yellow card) 43'; Postnikov (yellow card) 68'	Stadium: Zhetysu Stadium; Attendance: 3,500; Referee: Grigory Moskovchenko

28 September 2019 28	Tobol	0 – 0	Zhetysu	Kostanay
17:00 (UTC+6)	Andriuškevičius (yellow card) 86'	Report	Y.Tapalov (yellow card) 51'; Lebedzew (yellow card) 65'; Bekbaev (yellow card) 90+5'	Stadium: Central Stadium; Attendance: 4,000; Referee: Denis Tevyashov

5 October 2019 29	Zhetysu	2 – 1	Irtysh Pavlodar	Taldıqorğan
15:00 (UTC+6)	Darabayev 55' (yellow card) 83'; O.Kerimzhanov (yellow card) 64'; Toshev 88'	Report	R.Yesimov 8'; Stamenković (yellow card) 55' (yellow-red card) 89'; T.Muldinov (yellow card) 67'	Stadium: Zhetysu Stadium; Attendance: 2,500; Referee: Arman Ismuratov

19 October 2019 30	Atyrau	0 – 3	Zhetysu	Atyrau
16:00 (UTC+6)	A.Shabaev (yellow card) 27'; E.Abdrakhmanov (yellow card) 90+5'	Report	Toshev 11'; Stepanyuk 38'; Adamović 40'	Stadium: Munaishy Stadium; Attendance: 2,000; Referee: Anatolyi Vishnichenko

27 October 2019 31	Zhetysu	0 – 0	Taraz	Taldıqorğan
15:00 (UTC+6)	Darabayev (yellow card) 14'	Report	Gian (yellow card) 29'; Simčević (yellow card) 56'	Stadium: Zhetysu Stadium; Attendance: 2,000; Referee: Aleksandr Gauzer

3 November 2019 32	Okzhetpes	1 – 1	Zhetysu	Kokshetau
15:00 (UTC+6)	Dimov (yellow card) 10'; Dmitrijev (yellow card) 71'; Nusserbayev 78'; Kislitsyn (yellow card) 81'	Report	Ibraev (yellow card) 17'; Toshev 75'	Stadium: Okzhetpes Stadium; Attendance: 1,500; Referee: Bagdat Abdullaev

10 November 2019 33	Zhetysu	3 – 2	Shakhter Karagandy	Taldıqorğan
15:00 (UTC+6)	Stepanyuk 30'; Adamović 38'; Toshev 52'	Report	Zenjov 10'; Reginaldo (yellow card) 23'; Nurgaliyev 63'; B.Shaikhov (yellow card) 66'; Najaryan (yellow card) 68'; Baranovskyi (yellow card) 81'	Stadium: Zhetysu Stadium; Attendance: 2,000; Referee: Anatolyi Vishnichenko

==== League table ====
Pos	Team	Pld	W	D	L	GF	GA	GD	Pts	Qualification or relegation
3	Ordabasy	33	19	8	6	52	24	+28	65	Qualification for the Europa League first qualifying round
4	Tobol	33	19	6	8	45	27	+18	63	
5	Zhetysu	33	16	8	9	45	25	+20	56	
6	Kaisar	33	12	6	15	37	43	−6	42	Qualification for the Europa League second qualifying round (Note: Kaisar qualified for the Europa League second qualifying round by winning the 2019 Kazakhstan Cup.)
7	Okzhetpes	33	11	7	15	44	49	−5	40	

Source: UEFA, Soccerway
Rules for classification: 1) Points; 2) Goal difference; 3) Matches won; 4) Goals scored; 5) Away goals scored; 6) Head-to-head points; 7) Head-to-head matches won; 8) Head-to-head goal difference; 9) Head-to-head goals scored; 10) Head-to-head away goals scored; 11) Draw.

=== Kazakhstan Cup ===
10 April 2019 Last 16	Atyrau	1 – 0	Zhetysu	Astana
19:00 (UTC+6)	Bjedov (yellow card) 26'; Kubík (yellow card) 54'; A.Rodionov 78'	Report	Mawutor (red card) 41'	Stadium: Astana Arena; Attendance: 500; Referee: Aleksandr Zatula
Note: Match played at Astana's Astana Arena in Astana, instead of Atyrau's regular Munaishy Stadium in Atyrau.

== Squad statistics ==
As of match played 10 November 2019

=== Appearances and goals ===
No.	Pos	Nat	Player	Total		Premier League		Kazakhstan Cup	
No.	Pos	Nat	Player	Apps	Goals	Apps	Goals	Apps	Goals
1	GK	(Kazakhstan) KAZ	Andrey Shabanov	13	0	11+1	0	1	0
2	DF	(Kazakhstan) KAZ	Maxim Chalkin	1	0	0	0	1	0
3	DF	(Belarus) BLR	Andrey Lebedzew	19	0	14+4	0	1	0
4	DF	(Russia) RUS	Andrei Kharabara	4	0	0+3	0	1	0
5	MF	(Armenia) ARM	Kamo Hovhannisyan	27	5	24+3	5	0	0
7	FW	(Kazakhstan) KAZ	Elzhas Altynbekov	27	5	16+11	5	0	0
8	MF	(Kazakhstan) KAZ	Aslan Darabayev	17	2	16+1	2	0	0
9	FW	(Kazakhstan) KAZ	Aybar Zhaksylykov	24	6	4+20	6	0	0
10	MF	(Kyrgyzstan) KGZ	Raul Jalilov	9	0	2+6	0	1	0
11	MF	(Kazakhstan) KAZ	Sabyrkhan Ibraev	4	0	2+1	0	1	0
12	MF	(Kazakhstan) KAZ	Yerkin Tapalov	22	0	17+4	0	1	0
13	DF	(Kazakhstan) KAZ	Yermek Kuantayev	27	0	25+2	0	0	0
14	MF	(Ghana) GHA	David Mawutor	30	0	29	0	1	0
18	FW	(Kazakhstan) KAZ	Rifat Nurmugamet	1	0	0+1	0	0	0
21	MF	(Serbia) SRB	Nenad Adamović	31	5	28+3	5	0	0
23	DF	(Belarus) BLR	Nikita Naumov	29	4	29	4	0	0
26	DF	(Kazakhstan) KAZ	Olzhas Kerimzhanov	21	1	21	1	0	0
27	FW	(Ukraine) UKR	Ruslan Stepanyuk	32	4	30+2	4	0	0
28	DF	(Kazakhstan) KAZ	Miram Sapanov	19	0	16+2	0	1	0
33	FW	(Moldova) MDA	Oleg Hromțov	15	1	1+13	1	1	0
70	GK	(Kazakhstan) KAZ	Almat Bekbaev	20	0	20	0	0	0
77	MF	(Kazakhstan) KAZ	Almir Mukhutdinov	15	0	12+3	0	0	0
88	MF	(Lithuania) LTU	Mantas Kuklys	24	2	22+2	2	0	0
89	GK	(Kazakhstan) KAZ	Nurlybek Ayazbaev	2	0	2	0	0	0
90	FW	(Bulgaria) BUL	Martin Toshev	14	9	13+1	9	0	0
	MF	(Kazakhstan) KAZ	Ablaykhan Makhambetov	5	1	3+1	1	0+1	0
Players away from Zhetysu on loan:
Players who left Zhetysu during the season:
96	MF	(Kazakhstan) KAZ	Ivan Antipov	6	0	2+3	0	1	0
99	FW	(Bulgaria) BUL	Ivaylo Dimitrov	6	0	4+2	0	0	0

=== Goal scorers ===
Place	Position	Nation	Number	Name	Premier League	Kazakhstan Cup	Total
1	FW	(Bulgaria)	90	Martin Toshev	9	0	9
2	FW	(Kazakhstan)	9	Aybar Zhaksylykov	6	0	6
3	FW	(Kazakhstan)	7	Elzhas Altynbekov	5	0	5
3	MF	(Armenia)	5	Kamo Hovhannisyan	5	0	5
3	MF	(Serbia)	21	Nenad Adamović	5	0	5
6	DF	(Belarus)	23	Nikita Naumov	4	0	4
6	FW	(Ukraine)	27	Ruslan Stepanyuk	4	0	4
8	MF	(Lithuania)	88	Mantas Kuklys	2	0	2
8	MF	(Kazakhstan)	8	Aslan Darabayev	2	0	2
10	MF	(Kazakhstan)	8	Ablaykhan Makhambetov	1	0	1
10	FW	(Moldova)	33	Oleg Hromțov	1	0	1
10	DF	(Kazakhstan)	26	Olzhas Kerimzhanov	1	0	1
				TOTALS	45	0	45

=== Disciplinary record ===
Number	Nation	Position	Name	Premier League		Kazakhstan Cup		Total	
Number	Nation	Position	Name	Yellow card	Red card	Yellow card	Red card	Yellow card	Red card
1	(Kazakhstan)	GK	Andrey Shabanov	1	0	0	0	1	0
3	(Belarus)	DF	Andrey Lebedzew	4	0	0	0	4	0
5	(Armenia)	MF	Kamo Hovhannisyan	1	0	0	0	1	0
7	(Kazakhstan)	FW	Elzhas Altynbekov	6	0	0	0	6	0
8	(Kazakhstan)	MF	Aslan Darabayev	4	0	0	0	4	0
9	(Kazakhstan)	FW	Aybar Zhaksylykov	2	0	0	0	2	0
11	(Kazakhstan)	MF	Sabyrkhan Ibraev	1	0	0	0	1	0
12	(Kazakhstan)	MF	Yerkin Tapalov	2	0	0	0	2	0
13	(Kazakhstan)	DF	Yermek Kuantayev	1	0	0	0	1	0
14	(Ghana)	MF	David Mawutor	3	0	0	1	3	1
21	(Serbia)	MF	Nenad Adamović	3	0	0	0	3	0
23	(Belarus)	DF	Nikita Naumov	6	0	0	0	6	0
26	(Kazakhstan)	DF	Olzhas Kerimzhanov	7	2	0	0	7	2
27	(Ukraine)	FW	Ruslan Stepanyuk	2	0	0	0	2	0
28	(Kazakhstan)	DF	Miram Sapanov	1	0	0	0	1	0
70	(Kazakhstan)	GK	Almat Bekbaev	2	0	0	0	2	0
77	(Kazakhstan)	MF	Almir Mukhutdinov	2	0	0	0	2	0
88	(Lithuania)	MF	Mantas Kuklys	2	0	0	0	2	0
Players who left Zhetysu during the season:
8	(Kazakhstan)	MF	Ablaykhan Makhambetov	1	0	0	0	1	0
99	(Bulgaria)	FW	Ivaylo Dimitrov	1	0	0	0	1	0
			TOTALS	52	2	0	1	53	3
