= 2018 FC Zhetysu season =

FC Zhetysu
2018 season
- Chairman: Zheksenbai Kusainov
- Manager: Dmitry Ogai
- Stadium: Zhetysu Stadium
- Kazakhstan Premier League: 6th
- Kazakhstan Cup: Last 16 vs Tobol
- Top goalscorer: League: Two Players (5); All: Two Players (5)
Home colours	Away colours

The 2018 FC Zhetysu season is the club's first season back in the Kazakhstan Premier League following their relegation at the end of the 2016 season, and 21st season in total

== Squad ==
As of 1 August 2018

Note: Flags indicate national team as defined under FIFA eligibility rules; some limited exceptions apply. Players may hold more than one non-FIFA nationality.

No.	Pos.	Nation	Player
1	GK	KAZ	Andrey Shabanov
2	DF	KAZ	Temirlan Adilkhanov
3	DF	BLR	Andrey Lebedzew
4	DF	RUS	Andrei Kharabara
5	MF	ARM	Kamo Hovhannisyan
6	DF	GEO	Lasha Kasradze
7	FW	KAZ	Elzhas Altynbekov
8	DF	KAZ	Serik Sagyndykov
10	MF	KGZ	Raul Jalilov
11	MF	KAZ	Sabyrkhan Ibraev
13	DF	KAZ	Yermek Kuantayev (loan from Kairat)
14	MF	GHA	David Mawutor

No.	Pos.	Nation	Player
17	MF	KAZ	Zhakyp Kozhamberdi
18	MF	ARM	Edgar Malakyan
20	DF	BLR	Ivan Sadownichy
22	FW	KAZ	Rifat Nurmugamet (loan from Kairat)
26	DF	KAZ	Olzhas Kerimzhanov
27	FW	UKR	Ruslan Stepanyuk
33	FW	MDA	Oleg Hromțov
70	GK	KAZ	Almat Bekbaev
77	MF	KAZ	Almir Mukhutdinov
80	MF	UZB	Server Djeparov
88	MF	LTU	Mantas Kuklys
89	GK	KAZ	Nurlybek Ayazbaev

== Transfers ==
=== Winter ===
In: Note: Flags indicate national team as defined under FIFA eligibility rules; some limited exceptions apply. Players may hold more than one non-FIFA nationality.

No.	Pos.	Nation	Player
3	DF	CRO	Denis Glavina (from (Kazakhstan) Akzhayik)
5	MF	ARM	Kamo Hovhannisyan (from (Armenia) Alashkert)
6	DF	GEO	Lasha Kasradze (from (Georgia (country)) Samtredia)
7	FW	KAZ	Elzhas Altynbekov (from (Kazakhstan) Kaisar)
9	FW	SRB	Milan Bojović (from (Kazakhstan) Kaisar)
10	MF	KGZ	Raul Jalilov (from (Kazakhstan) Tobol)
13	DF	KAZ	Yermek Kuantayev (loan from (Kazakhstan) Kairat)
14	MF	GHA	David Mawutor (from (Tajikistan) Istiklol)
17	MF	KAZ	Zhakyp Kozhamberdi (from (Kazakhstan) Taraz)
18	MF	ARM	Edgar Malakyan (from (Ukraine) Stal Kamianske)
20	DF	BLR	Ivan Sadownichy (from (Kazakhstan) Shakhter Karagandy)
21	MF	SVN	Dino Martinović (from (Bulgaria) Lokomotiv Plovdiv)
22	FW	KAZ	Rifat Nurmugamet (loan extended from (Kazakhstan) Kairat)
24	GK	KAZ	Dzhurakhon Babakhanov (from (Kazakhstan) Taraz)
27	DF	KAZ	Timur Rudoselskiy (from (Kazakhstan) Kairat)
77	MF	KAZ	Almir Mukhutdinov (from (Kazakhstan) Tobol)
88	MF	LTU	Mantas Kuklys (from (Lithuania) Žalgiris)
89	GK	KAZ	Nurlybek Ayazbaev (from (Kazakhstan) Caspiy)

Out: Note: Flags indicate national team as defined under FIFA eligibility rules; some limited exceptions apply. Players may hold more than one non-FIFA nationality.

No.	Pos.	Nation	Player
3	DF	MDA	Ștefan Burghiu
5	MF	KAZ	Adilet Abdenabi (to (Kazakhstan) Taraz)
6	FW	KAZ	Aleksey Shakin (to (Kazakhstan) Altai Semey)
8	DF	KAZ	Serik Sagyndykov
9	FW	KAZ	Vyacheslav Serdyukov
10	MF	KAZ	Vladimir Vyatkin
12	MF	UKR	Artem Kasyanov (to (Kazakhstan) Okzhetpes)
13	MF	KAZ	Adilkhan Tanzharikov
20	MF	KAZ	Evgeniy Levin
22	GK	KAZ	Alexander Rushinas
25	GK	KAZ	Dmitry Kolbuntsov
29	DF	KAZ	Aset Doskaliev
44	DF	KAZ	Vladimir Pokatilov
80	FW	RUS	Atsamaz Burayev
88	GK	KAZ	Shyngyskhan Ahlasov
98	DF	KAZ	Rauan Orynbasar

=== Summer ===
In: Note: Flags indicate national team as defined under FIFA eligibility rules; some limited exceptions apply. Players may hold more than one non-FIFA nationality.

No.	Pos.	Nation	Player
3	DF	BLR	Andrey Lebedzew (from (Belarus) Dynamo Brest)
27	FW	UKR	Ruslan Stepanyuk (from (Ukraine) Veres Rivne)
70	GK	KAZ	Almat Bekbaev (from (Kazakhstan) Irtysh Pavlodar)
80	MF	UZB	Server Djeparov (from (Iran) Esteghlal)

Out: Note: Flags indicate national team as defined under FIFA eligibility rules; some limited exceptions apply. Players may hold more than one non-FIFA nationality.

No.	Pos.	Nation	Player
3	MF	CRO	Denis Glavina (to (Kazakhstan) Akzhayik)
9	FW	SRB	Milan Bojović
19	MF	KAZ	Taras Danilyuk
21	MF	SVN	Dino Martinović (to (Bulgaria) Vereya)
24	GK	KAZ	Dzhurakhon Babakhanov (to (Kazakhstan) Irtysh Pavlodar)
27	DF	KAZ	Timur Rudoselskiy (to (Israel) Hapoel Petah Tikva)

== Competitions ==
=== Premier League ===
==== Results summary ====
Overall								Home						Away					
Pld	W	D	L	GF	GA	GD	Pts	W	D	L	GF	GA	GD	W	D	L	GF	GA	GD
33	11	10	12	36	40	−4	43	8	5	4	23	18	+5	3	5	8	13	22	−9

Last updated: 11 November 2018.
Source: See Results

==== Results by round ====
Round	1	2	3	4	5	6	7	8	9	10	11	12	13	14	15	16	17	18	19	20	21	22	23	24	25	26	27	28	29	30	31	32	33
Ground	H	H	A	H	A	H	A	H	A	H	A	A	H	A	H	A	H	A	H	A	H	A	H	A	A	H	H	A	H	A	H	A	H
Result	L	L	D	W	L	W	L	L	D	W	L	L	W	D	W	W	D	L	L	W	D	L	W	W	D	W	D	L	D	D	D	L	W
Position	11	12	10	8	9	7	7	7	8	6	8	9	7	7	5	5	4	6	7	5	5	6	6	5	5	4	4	4	4	5	5	7	6

Source: See Results
A = Away; H = Home; W = Win; D = Draw; L = Loss

==== Results ====
11 March 2018 1	Zhetysu	0 – 1	Tobol	Taldykorgan
15:00 (UTC+6)	R.Nurmugamet (yellow card) 79'	Report	Turysbek 38'; Kankava (yellow card) 50'; Moldakaraev (yellow card) 56'; Kvekveskiri (yellow card) 63'	Stadium: Zhetysu Reserve Stadium; Attendance: 1,000; Referee: Marat Iskakov

17 March 2018 2	Zhetysu	0 – 2	Astana	Taldykorgan
15:00 (UTC+6)	Kozhamberdi (yellow card) 83'	Report	Twumasi 28'; Shchotkin 45+3'	Stadium: Zhetysu Reserve Stadium; Attendance: 1,000; Referee: Bagdat Abdullaev

1 April 2018 3	Shakhter Karagandy	1 – 1	Zhetysu	Astana
15:00 (UTC+6)	S.Shaff 45'; M.Gabyshev (yellow card) 70'	Report	Ibraev (yellow card) 29'; Hromțov 80'	Stadium: Astana Arena; Attendance: 700; Referee: Aydin Rakhimbayev

7 April 2018 4	Zhetysu	1 – 0	Kaisar	Taldykorgan
15:00 (UTC+6)	R.Jalilov 24'; Mukhutdinov (yellow card) 26'; Kozhamberdi (yellow card) 85'	Report	I.Amirseitov (yellow card) 55'; Tagybergen (yellow card) 90+2'	Stadium: Zhetysu Reserve Stadium; Attendance: 800; Referee: Timur Kumashev

14 April 2018 5	Kyzylzhar	1 – 0	Zhetysu	Petropavl
15:00 (UTC+6)	Venkov (yellow card) 11'; Punoševac 26'; A.Ayaganov (yellow card) 90'	Report	Glavina (yellow card) 81'; R.Nurmugamet (yellow card) 89'	Stadium: Karasay Stadium; Attendance: 4,000; Referee: Aleksei Bobrov

22 April 2018 6	Zhetysu	2 – 1	Irtysh Pavlodar	Taldıqorğan
16:00 (UTC+6)	Kozhamberdi (yellow card) 64'; R.Nurmugamet 80'; Hromțov 90'	Report	Fonseca 34' (yellow card) 39'; Popadiuc (yellow card) 39'; D.Shmidt (yellow card) 54'	Stadium: Zhetysu Stadium; Attendance: 2,500; Referee: Bakhyt Kyzylbaev

28 April 2018 7	Atyrau	1 – 0	Zhetysu	Atyrau
17:30 (UTC+6)	Khairullin 68'; Adeniji (yellow card) 90'	Report	Kasradze (yellow card) 40'	Stadium: Tomarly Stadion; Attendance: 1,000; Referee: Igor Chesnokov

5 May 2018 8	Zhetysu	1 – 3	Kairat	Taldıqorğan
17:00 (UTC+6)	Kozhamberdi 47'; Glavina (yellow card) 58'	Report	Anene 10' (yellow card) 78'; Rudoselskiy 16' (o.g.); Lunin 71'	Stadium: Zhetysu Stadium; Attendance: 3,000; Referee: Aleksandr Gauzer

9 May 2018 9	Aktobe	1 – 1	Zhetysu	Aktobe
19:00 (UTC+6)	Aimbetov (yellow card) 17'; Marjanović 40'; Pizzelli (yellow card) 63'; A.Kakimov (yellow card) 71'; Fabrício (yellow card) 90+4'	Report	Bojović 48'	Stadium: Central Stadium; Attendance: 11,000; Referee: Arman Ismuratov

14 May 2018 10	Zhetysu	4 – 2	Ordabasy	Taldıqorğan
17:00 (UTC+6)	Bojović 28', 45+1' (pen.), 60'; Glavina (yellow card) 30'; R.Jalilov (yellow card) 39'; Kuklys 79'; N.Ayazbaev (yellow card) 85'	Report	T.Adyrbekov (yellow card) 22'; U.Zhaksybaev (yellow card) 51'; Jighauri 78', 90+3'; Dosmagambetov (yellow card) 81'	Stadium: Zhetysu Stadium; Attendance: 1,000; Referee: Artyom Kuchin

19 May 2018 11	Akzhayik	2 – 0	Zhetysu	Oral
18:00 (UTC+6)	I.Antipov (yellow card) 42'; Eseola 67', 80'	Report	Kasradze (yellow card) 62'	Stadium: Petr Atoyan Stadium; Attendance: 1,500; Referee: Daniyar Sakhi

27 May 2018 12	Astana	3 – 0	Zhetysu	Astana
18:00 (UTC+6)	Twumasi 26'; Glavina 46' (o.g.); Kleinheisler (yellow card) 53'; Shomko (yellow card) 68'; Tomasov 74'	Report		Stadium: Astana Arena; Attendance: 2,500; Referee: Furkat Atajanov

31 May 2018 13	Zhetysu	1 – 0	Shakhter Karagandy	Taldıqorğan
17:00 (UTC+6)	Malakyan 14' (yellow card) 88'; Mukhutdinov (yellow card) 65'; Kozhamberdi (yellow card) 79'; Glavina (yellow card) 86'	Report	Tkachuk (yellow card) 85' (yellow-red card) 90'; Kojašević (yellow card) 88'	Stadium: Zhetysu Stadium; Attendance: 1,500; Referee: Timur Kumashev

17 June 2018 14	Kaisar	0 – 0	Zhetysu	Kyzylorda
19:00 (UTC+6)	D.Yevstigneyev (yellow card) 33' (yellow-red card) 67'; Lamanje (yellow card) 39'; V.Chureyev (yellow card) 57'	Report	E.Altynbekov (yellow card) 27'; Sadownichy (yellow card) 16'; Mawutor (yellow card) 45+1'; Ibraev (yellow card) 52'	Stadium: Gani Muratbayev Stadium; Attendance: 2,000; Referee: Aydin Rakhimbayev

23 June 2018 15	Zhetysu	2 – 1	Kyzylzhar	Taldıqorğan
18:00 (UTC+6)	Punoševac 13' (o.g.); Mawutor 90+3'	Report	Delić (yellow card) 3'; Grigalashvili 61'; Tsirin (yellow card) 90+1'	Stadium: Zhetysu Stadium; Attendance: 2,000; Referee: Zhandos Abzhan

1 July 2018 16	Irtysh Pavlodar	0 – 2	Zhetysu	Pavlodar
19:00 (UTC+6)	Stamenković (yellow card) 41'; R.Yesimov (yellow card) 68'; Avrămia (yellow card) 85'; V.Vomenko (yellow card) 90+2'	Report	Hovhannisyan 56'; Sadownichy 81'	Stadium: Central Stadium; Attendance: 1,500; Referee: Marat Iskakov

7 July 2018 17	Zhetysu	2 – 2	Atyrau	Taldıqorğan
18:00 (UTC+6)	Malakyan (yellow card) 27'; Mawutor 74'; Hromțov 87'	Report	Khairullin 5' (pen.); Barbarić 47'	Stadium: Zhetysu Stadium; Attendance: 1,000; Referee: Ruslan Omarov

15 July 2018 18	Kairat	2 – 1	Zhetysu	Almaty
19:00 (UTC+6)	Eseola 56'; Eppel 66'	Report	E.Altynbekov 90'	Stadium: Central Stadium; Attendance: 2,000; Referee: Saken Bayimbet

21 July 2018 19	Zhetysu	1 – 2	Aktobe	Taldıqorğan
18:00 (UTC+6)	O.Kerimzhanov (yellow card) 28'; Mukhutdinov (yellow card) 38'; R.Jalilov 65'; Ibraev (yellow card) 90+1'	Report	B.Kairov 30'; A.Shurigin (yellow card) 44'; Hromțov 82'; Maurice (yellow card) 90+1'	Stadium: Zhetysu Stadium; Attendance: 1,500; Referee: Denis Tevyashov

29 July 2018 20	Ordabasy	1 – 2	Zhetysu	Shymkent
20:00 (UTC+6)	Diakate 67' (pen.)	Report	Kuklys 16'; Malakyan 27'; Sadownichy (yellow card) 76'; Kozhamberdi (yellow card) 84' (yellow-red card) 90+2'	Stadium: Kazhymukan Munaitpasov Stadium; Attendance: 4,000; Referee: Artyom Kuchin

4 August 2018 21	Zhetysu	1 – 1	Akzhayik	Taldıqorğan
18:00 (UTC+6)	R.Jalilov 34'; Hromțov (yellow card) 36'	Report	Glavina (yellow card) 39'; B.Shaikhov (yellow card) 56'; Karašausks 70'	Stadium: Zhetysu Stadium; Attendance: 2,000; Referee: Aleksandr Gauzer

11 August 2018 22	Tobol	1 – 0	Zhetysu	Kostanay
19:00 (UTC+6)	Kassaï (yellow card) 49'; Darabayev (yellow card) 56' (goal) 58'; Larie (yellow card) 62'; Nurgaliev (yellow card) 77'	Report	Kharabara (yellow card) 41'	Stadium: Central Stadium; Attendance: 3,000; Referee: Furkat Atajanov

19 August 2018 23	Zhetysu	2 – 0	Irtysh Pavlodar	Taldıqorğan
18:00 (UTC+6)	Kuklys 17'; Mukhutdinov (yellow card) 19'; Hromțov 36'	Report	R.Aslan (yellow card) 11' (yellow-red card) 16'; Stamenković (yellow card) 55'; R.Yesimov (yellow card) 70'; I.Kalinin (yellow card) 89'	Stadium: Zhetysu Stadium; Attendance: 2,500; Referee: Aleksandr Aliyev

25 August 2018 24	Aktobe	2 – 3	Zhetysu	Aktobe
21:00 (UTC+6)	Valiullin (yellow card) 50'; A.Shurigin (yellow card) 61'; Pizzelli 76'; Reynaldo 85' (yellow card) 85'; Simčević (yellow card) 90+4'; Z.Kukeyev (yellow card) 90+4'	Report	Stepanyuk 28', 61'; Ibraev (yellow card) 43' (yellow-red card) 56'; E.Altynbekov 86'; Bekbaev (yellow card) 90+3'; Kharabara (yellow card) 90+4'	Stadium: Central Stadium; Attendance: 9,000; Referee: Bolat Saryev

16 September 2018 26	Tobol	2 – 2	Zhetysu	Kostanay
18:00 (UTC+6)	Kvekveskiri 32'; Nurgaliev 35'; Darabayev (yellow card) 62'; Larie (yellow card) 79'	Report	Stepanyuk 22'; Sadownichy (yellow card) 49'; R.Jalilov (yellow card) 58'; Mawutor (yellow card) 78'; Djeparov 80' (pen.)	Stadium: Central Stadium; Attendance: 3,000; Referee: Ruslan Omarov

22 September 2018 27	Zhetysu	1 – 0	Kairat	Taldıqorğan
16:00 (UTC+6)	Hromțov (yellow card) 62'; Kuklys 89' (pen.)	Report	Eppel (yellow card) 12'; Arshavin (yellow card) 28'; Juan Felipe (yellow card) 54'; Zhukov (yellow card) 71'; Palitsevich (yellow card) 88'	Stadium: Zhetysu Stadium; Attendance: 2,000; Referee: Anatolyi Vishnichenko

26 September 2018 25	Zhetysu	1 – 1	Ordabasy	Taldıqorğan
16:00 (UTC+6)	Kuantayev (yellow card) 48'; Hromțov 66' (pen.)	Report	T.Erlanov 28' (yellow card) 63'; Diakate (yellow card) 76'	Stadium: Zhetysu Stadium; Attendance: 1,000; Referee: Marat Iskakov

30 September 2018 28	Astana	3 – 0	Zhetysu	Astana
18:00 (UTC+6)	Janga 38'; Tomasov 85', 87'	Report	Mawutor (yellow card) 43'	Stadium: Astana Arena; Attendance: 2,500; Referee: Bolat Karlibayev

6 October 2018 29	Zhetysu	1 – 1	Shakhter Karagandy	Taldıqorğan
16:00 (UTC+6)	Kuantayev (yellow card) 27'; O.Kerimzhanov (yellow card) 31'; Hromțov (yellow card) 41'; Stepanyuk 69'; Ibraev (yellow card) 73'	Report	Najaryan 8'; Y.Tarasov (yellow card) 79'	Stadium: Zhetysu Stadium; Attendance: 2,000; Referee: Askhat Abdanbayev

21 October 2018 30	Kyzylzhar	1 – 1	Zhetysu	Petropavl
15:00 (UTC+6)	Delić (yellow card) 50' (goal) 66'; Drachenko (yellow card) 76'	Report	Sadownichy (yellow card) 7'; E.Altynbekov (yellow card) 13'; Mukhutdinov (yellow card) 24'; Mawutor (yellow card) 36'; Kuklys 45'; Malakyan (yellow card) 74'; Kharabara (yellow card) 81'	Stadium: Avangard Stadium; Attendance: 3,000; Referee: Timur Kumashev

27 October 2018 31	Zhetysu	0 – 0	Atyrau	Taldıqorğan
15:00 (UTC+6)		Report	Sikimić (yellow card) 42'; K.Kalmuratov (yellow card) 71'; Sergienko (yellow card) 73'; Loginovsky (yellow card) 90+2'; Ablitarov (yellow card) 90+4'	Stadium: Zhetysu Stadium; Attendance: 1,500; Referee: Arman Ismuratov

3 November 2018 32	Kaisar	1 – 0	Zhetysu	Kyzylorda
15:00 (UTC+6)	V.Chureyev (yellow card) 48'; Sadownichy 51' (o.g.); Baizhanov (yellow card) 54'; Tagybergen (yellow card) 89'	Report	Stepanyuk (red card) 88'; Lebedzew (yellow card) 89'	Stadium: Gani Muratbayev Stadium; Attendance: 2,500; Referee: Aleksandr Aliyev

11 November 2018 33	Zhetysu	3 – 1	Akzhayik	Taldıqorğan
15:00 (UTC+6)	E.Tapalov 6' (o.g.); Mukhutdinov 67'; Ibraev 90+1'	Report	Basov (yellow card) 14'; Mané 79'	Stadium: Zhetysu Stadium; Attendance: 1,500; Referee: Daniyar Sakhi

==== League table ====
Pos	Team	Pld	W	D	L	GF	GA	GD	Pts	Qualification or relegation
4	Ordabasy	33	13	7	13	38	44	−6	46	Qualification for the Europa League first qualifying round (Note: Since the winners of 2018 Kazakhstan Cup, Kairat, qualified for European competition based on their league position, the spot awarded to the Cup winner (Europa League first qualifying round) was passed to the next best-placed team (the fourth-placed team).)
5	Kaisar	33	11	12	10	35	31	+4	45	
6	Zhetysu	33	11	10	12	36	40	−4	43	
7	Aktobe (Note: Aktobe had six points deducted on 27 April 2018 as a punishment for unpaid debts to former player Danilo Neco.)	33	13	9	11	51	47	+4	42	
8	Shakhter Karagandy	33	8	12	13	29	36	−7	36	

Source: UEFA, Soccerway
Rules for classification: 1) Points; 2) Goal difference; 3) Matches won; 4) Goals scored; 5) Away goals scored; 6) Head-to-head points; 7) Head-to-head matches won; 8) Head-to-head goal difference; 9) Head-to-head goals scored; 10) Head-to-head away goals scored; 11) Draw.

=== Kazakhstan Cup ===
18 April 2018 Last 16	Tobol	1 – 0	Zhetysu	Kostanay
17:00 (UTC+6)	Darabayev (yellow card) 54'; Turysbek 65'; Kankava (yellow card) 90+2'	Report	Sadownichy (yellow card) 24'; Mawutor (yellow card) 50'	Stadium: Central Stadium; Attendance: 1,500; Referee: Bolat Saryev

== Squad statistics ==
As of Match played 11 November 2018

=== Appearances and goals ===
No.	Pos	Nat	Player	Total		Premier League		Kazakhstan Cup	
No.	Pos	Nat	Player	Apps	Goals	Apps	Goals	Apps	Goals
1	GK	(Kazakhstan) KAZ	Andrey Shabanov	14	0	14	0	0	0
2	DF	(Kazakhstan) KAZ	Temirlan Adilkhanov	1	0	0	0	1	0
3	DF	(Belarus) BLR	Andrey Lebedzew	14	0	14	0	0	0
4	MF	(Russia) RUS	Andrei Kharabara	12	0	10+2	0	0	0
5	MF	(Armenia) ARM	Kamo Hovhannisyan	31	1	26+5	1	0	0
6	DF	(Georgia (country)) GEO	Lasha Kasradze	21	0	21	0	0	0
7	FW	(Kazakhstan) KAZ	Elzhas Altynbekov	17	2	9+7	2	1	0
10	MF	(Kyrgyzstan) KGZ	Raul Jalilov	24	3	16+7	3	0+1	0
11	MF	(Kazakhstan) KAZ	Sabyrkhan Ibraev	25	1	23+2	1	0	0
13	DF	(Kazakhstan) KAZ	Yermek Kuantayev	21	0	18+3	0	0	0
14	MF	(Ghana) GHA	David Mawutor	31	2	30	2	1	0
15	MF	(Kazakhstan) KAZ	Demiyat Slambekov	1	0	0	0	1	0
17	MF	(Kazakhstan) KAZ	Zhakyp Kozhamberdi	21	1	9+12	1	0	0
18	MF	(Armenia) ARM	Edgar Malakyan	31	1	22+9	1	0	0
20	DF	(Belarus) BLR	Ivan Sadownichy	16	1	13+2	1	1	0
22	FW	(Kazakhstan) KAZ	Rifat Nurmugamet	14	1	0+13	1	1	0
23	DF	(Kazakhstan) KAZ	Askhat Baltabekov	1	0	0	0	1	0
26	DF	(Kazakhstan) KAZ	Olzhas Kerimzhanov	17	0	14+2	0	1	0
27	FW	(Ukraine) UKR	Ruslan Stepanyuk	12	4	10+2	4	0	0
35	FW	(Moldova) MDA	Oleg Hromțov	27	5	10+16	5	0+1	0
70	GK	(Kazakhstan) KAZ	Almat Bekbaev	13	0	13	0	0	0
77	MF	(Kazakhstan) KAZ	Almir Mukhutdinov	27	1	25+2	1	0	0
80	MF	(Uzbekistan) UZB	Server Djeparov	5	1	4+1	1	0	0
88	MF	(Lithuania) LTU	Mantas Kuklys	31	5	28+3	5	0	0
89	GK	(Kazakhstan) KAZ	Nurlybek Ayazbaev	6	0	4+1	0	1	0
Players away from Zhetysu on loan:
Players who left Zhetysu during the season:
3	DF	(Croatia) CRO	Denis Glavina	14	0	14	0	0	0
9	FW	(Serbia) SRB	Milan Bojović	13	4	10+3	4	0	0
21	MF	(Slovenia) SVN	Dino Martinović	5	0	3+1	0	1	0
24	GK	(Kazakhstan) KAZ	Dzhurakhon Babakhanov	2	0	2	0	0	0
27	DF	(Kazakhstan) KAZ	Timur Rudoselskiy	3	0	1+1	0	1	0

=== Goal scorers ===
Place	Position	Nation	Number	Name	Premier League	Kazakhstan Cup	Total
1	FW	(Moldova)	35	Oleg Hromțov	5	0	5
1	MF	(Lithuania)	88	Mantas Kuklys	5	0	5
3	FW	(Serbia)	9	Milan Bojović	4	0	4
3	FW	(Ukraine)	27	Ruslan Stepanyuk	4	0	4
5	MF	(Kyrgyzstan)	10	Raul Jalilov	3	0	3
6	MF	(Ghana)	14	David Mawutor	2	0	2
6	MF	(Armenia)	18	Edgar Malakyan	2	0	2
6	FW	(Kazakhstan)	7	Elzhas Altynbekov	2	0	2
6				Own goal	2	0	2
10	FW	(Kazakhstan)	22	Rifat Nurmugamet	1	0	1
10	MF	(Kazakhstan)	17	Zhakyp Kozhamberdi	1	0	1
10	MF	(Armenia)	5	Kamo Hovhannisyan	1	0	1
10	DF	(Belarus)	20	Ivan Sadownichy	1	0	1
10	MF	(Uzbekistan)	80	Server Djeparov	1	0	1
10	MF	(Kazakhstan)	77	Almir Mukhutdinov	1	0	1
10	MF	(Kazakhstan)	11	Sabyrkhan Ibraev	1	0	1
				TOTALS	36	0	36

=== Disciplinary record ===
Number	Nation	Position	Name	Premier League		Kazakhstan Cup		Total	
Number	Nation	Position	Name	Booked	Sent off (straight red)	Booked	Sent off (straight red)	Booked	Sent off (straight red)
3	(Belarus)	DF	Andrey Lebedzew	1	0	0	0	1	0
4	(Russia)	MF	Andrei Kharabara	3	0	0	0	3	0
6	(Georgia (country))	DF	Lasha Kasradze	2	0	0	0	2	0
7	(Kazakhstan)	FW	Elzhas Altynbekov	2	0	0	0	2	0
10	(Kyrgyzstan)	MF	Raul Jalilov	2	0	0	0	2	0
11	(Kazakhstan)	MF	Sabyrkhan Ibraev	6	1	0	0	6	1
13	(Kazakhstan)	DF	Yermek Kuantayev	2	0	0	0	2	0
14	(Ghana)	MF	David Mawutor	3	0	1	0	4	0
17	(Kazakhstan)	MF	Zhakyp Kozhamberdi	6	1	0	0	6	1
18	(Armenia)	MF	Edgar Malakyan	3	0	0	0	3	0
20	(Belarus)	DF	Ivan Sadownichy	4	0	1	0	5	0
22	(Kazakhstan)	FW	Rifat Nurmugamet	2	0	0	0	2	0
26	(Kazakhstan)	DF	Olzhas Kerimzhanov	2	0	0	0	2	0
27	(Ukraine)	FW	Ruslan Stepanyuk	0	1	0	0	0	1
35	(Moldova)	FW	Oleg Hromțov	3	0	0	0	3	0
70	(Kazakhstan)	GK	Almat Bekbaev	1	0	0	0	1	0
77	(Kazakhstan)	MF	Almir Mukhutdinov	5	0	0	0	5	0
89	(Kazakhstan)	GK	Nurlybek Ayazbaev	1	0	0	0	1	0
Players who left Zhetysu during the season:
3	(Croatia)	DF	Denis Glavina	4	0	0	0	4	0
			TOTALS	52	3	2	0	54	3
