= David Mawutor =

Footballer (born 1992)

Personal information
- Full name: David Gordon Mawutor
- Date of birth: 12 April 1992 (age 34)
- Place of birth: Accra, Ghana
- Height: 1.81 m (5 ft 11 in)
- Position: Midfielder

Team information
- Current team: Tishreen

Senior career*
Years	Team	Apps	(Gls)
2007–2009	Thyword FC		
2009–2011	YF Juventus SC		
2012	→ Ravshan Kulob (loan)		
2013	Ravshan Kulob		
2014	Istiklol	16	(1)
2016–2018	Istiklol	28	(6)
2018–2021	Zhetysu	77	(3)
2021	Wisła Kraków	7	(0)
2021	Shakhter Karagandy	3	(1)
2022	Negeri Sembilan	4	(0)
2023	Aksu	7	(0)
2024	Turan	12	(0)
2024	Ravshan Kulob	7	(1)
2025	Khujand	9	(1)
2025–	Tishreen		
- * Club domestic league appearances and goals as of 4 December 2025

David Gordon Mawutor (born 12 April 1992) is a Ghanaian professional footballer who plays as a midfielder for Tishreen. He predominantly plays as a central midfielder and at times plays as a defensive.

== Career ==
=== Early career ===
Mawutor was born in Accra on 12 April 1992 and played for Thyword FC and YF Juventus SC 2.division in Ghana before moving to Tajikistan to start his professional career in 2012.

=== Ravshan Kulob ===
Mawutor initially joined Tajik League side Ravshan Kulob on loan for the 2012 season, making the move permanent the following season. Mawutor made his AFC Cup debut for Ravshan Kulob in a 0–1 defeat against Al-Ramtha on 6 March 2013. In 2013, Mawutor went on trial with Neftchala as a striker.

=== FC Istiklol ===
In January 2014, Mawutor signed a one-year contract with FC Istiklol. During January 2015, Mawutor went on trial with RFNL side Yenisey Krasnoyarsk. Mawutor left Istiklol in 2015, rejoining the club during the summer of 2016, and was included in the clubs 2017 AFC Cup squad, making his debut against Dordoi Bishkek, scoring the first goal in Istiklol's 2–0 win. On 18 April 2017, David scored his second goal for FC Istiklol in their 3–1 victory over FC Alay in the 2017 AFC Cup. Mawutor featured for Istiklol in their 1–0 2017 AFC Cup Final defeat to Iraqi club Al-Quwa Al-Jawiya on 4 November 2017, with the only goal coming from Emad Mohsin.

Towards the end of 2017, Mawutor began to attract interest from clubs in Europe. On 29 January 2018, Istiklol announced that Mawutor had left the club after they agreed to mutually terminate his contract four months early.

=== PSMS Medan ===
In January 2018, Mawutor was named in PSMS Medan's President's Cup squad, but due to an issue with his registration never officially joined.

=== Zhetysu ===
In February 2018, it was reported that Mawutor had signed a one-year contract with Kazakhstan Premier League club FC Zhetysu.

=== Wisła Kraków ===
On 21 February 2021, Mawutor signed with Polish club Wisła Kraków. Mawutor left Wisła Kraków in May 2021 following the expiration of his contract, having played seven times for the club.

=== Shakhter Karagandy ===
On 14 July 2021, Shakhter Karagandy announced the signing of Mawutor.

=== Aksu ===
On 20 July 2023, Mawutor returned to the Kazakhstan Premier League, signing for Aksu.

=== Ravshan Kulob ===
On 27 July 2024, Ravshan Kulob announced the return of Mawutor.

=== Khujand ===
On 9 February 2025, Khujand announced the signing of Mawutor.

== Personal life ==
In November 2016, Mawutor married his Ukrainian wife Victoria. He holds both Ghanaian and Tajiki citizenship.

== Career statistics ==
As of match played 4 December 2024

Appearances and goals by club, season and competition
Club	Season	League			National cup (Note: Includes Tajikistan Cup, Kazakhstan Cup)		Continental		Other		Total	
Club	Season	Division	Apps	Goals	Apps	Goals	Apps	Goals	Apps	Goals	Apps	Goals
Ravshan Kulob (loan)	2012	Tajikistan Higher League					—		—			
Ravshan Kulob	2013	Tajikistan Higher League					6 (Note: Appearances in AFC Cup)	0	—		6	0
Istiklol	2014	Tajikistan Higher League	16	1	5	0	—		1 (Note: Appearance in Tajik Supercup)	1	22	2
Istiklol	2016	Tajikistan Higher League	11	7	7	1	0	0	0	0	18	8
Istiklol	2017	Tajikistan Higher League	11	1	4	0	10	2	1	0	26	3
Istiklol	Total		22	8	11	1	10	2	1	0	44	11
Zhetysu	2018	Kazakhstan Premier League	30	2	1	0	—		—		31	2
Zhetysu	2019	Kazakhstan Premier League	29	0	1	0	—		—		30	0
Zhetysu	2020	Kazakhstan Premier League	18	1	0	0	—		—		18	1
Zhetysu	Total		77	3	2	0	0	0	0	0	79	3
Wisła Kraków	2020–21	Ekstraklasa	7	0	—		—		—		7	0
Shakhter Karagandy	2021	Kazakhstan Premier League	3	1	3	0	6 (Note: Appearances in UEFA Europa Conference League)	0	0	0	12	1
Negeri Sembilan	2022	Malaysia Super League	4	0	0	0	—		—		4	0
Aksu	2023	Kazakhstan Premier League	7	0	0	0	—		—		7	0
Turan	2024	Kazakhstan Premier League	12	0	1	0	—		2 (Note: Appearances in Kazakhstan League Cup)	0	15	0
Ravshan Kulob	2024	Tajikistan Higher League	7	1			5 (Note: Appearances in AFC Champions League Two)	1	—		12	2
Career total			155	14	22	1	27	3	4	1	208	19

== Honours ==
Ravshan Kulob

- Tajik League: 2013

Istiklol

- Tajik League: 2014, 2015,2016, 2017
- Tajik Cup: 2014, 2015, 2016
- Tajik Supercup: 2014, 2015, 2016

Individual

- Best Foreign Footballer of Tajikistan Championship: 2013
