= Sabyrkhan Ibrayev =

Kazakhstani footballer (born 1988)

Personal information
- Full name: Sabyrkhan Nurlykhanuly Ibrayev
- Date of birth: 22 March 1988 (age 38)
- Place of birth: Almaty, Kazakhstan
- Height: 1.76 m (5 ft 9 in)
- Position: Midfielder

Team information
- Current team: Makhtaaral

Senior career*
Years	Team	Apps	(Gls)
2006–2007	Irtysh Pavlodar	44	(3)
2008–2009	Tobol	48	(4)
2010	Kairat	20	(0)
2011	Kaisar	26	(1)
2012	Astana-1964	24	(3)
2013	Kaisar	5	(0)
2013	Kyzylzhar	10	(0)
2014–2015	Vostok	48	(12)
2016	Makhtaaral	26	(6)
2017–2019	Zhetysu	50	(9)
2020–	Makhtaaral		

International career
2008–2009	Kazakhstan	5	(0)
- * Club domestic league appearances and goals as of 11 November 2019

Sabyrkhan Nurlykhanuly Ibrayev (Kazakh: Сабырхан Нұрлыханұлы Ыбыраев) is a Kazakhstani football midfielder who plays for FC Makhtaaral.

== Club ==
In 2020, Ibrayev joined FC Makhtaaral.

=== International ===
Ibrayev made his debut for Kazakhstan on 23 May 2008 against Russia in a friendly match.

== Career statistics ==
=== Club ===
As of match played 10 November 2019

Appearances and goals by club, season and competition
Club	Season	League			National Cup		Continental		Other		Total	
Club	Season	Division	Apps	Goals	Apps	Goals	Apps	Goals	Apps	Goals	Apps	Goals
Irtysh Pavlodar	2006	Kazakhstan Premier League	27	2			-		-		27	2
Irtysh Pavlodar	2007	Kazakhstan Premier League	17	1			-		-		17	1
Irtysh Pavlodar	Total		44	3			-	-	-	-	44	3
Tobol	2008	Kazakhstan Premier League	25	3			-		-		25	3
Tobol	2009	Kazakhstan Premier League	23	1			-		-		23	1
Tobol	Total		48	4			-	-	-	-	48	4
Kairat	2010	Kazakhstan Premier League	20	0			–		–		20	0
Kaisar	2011	Kazakhstan Premier League	26	1			–		–		26	1
Astana-1964	2012	Kazakhstan First Division	24	3			–		–		24	3
Kaisar	2013	Kazakhstan First Division	5	0			–		–		5	0
Kyzylzhar	2013	Kazakhstan First Division	10	0			–		–		10	0
Vostok	2014	Kazakhstan First Division	26	9			-		-		26	9
Vostok	2015	Kazakhstan First Division	22	3			-		-		22	3
Vostok	Total		48	12			-	-	-	-	48	12
Makhtaaral	2016	Kazakhstan First Division	26	6			–		–		26	6
Zhetysu	2017	Kazakhstan First Division	22	8			-		-		22	8
Zhetysu	2018	Kazakhstan Premier League	25	1	0	0	-		-		25	1
Zhetysu	2019	Kazakhstan Premier League	3	0	1	0	-		-		4	0
Zhetysu	Total		50	9	1	0	-	-	-	-	51	9
Career total			301	38	1	0	-	-	-	-	302+	38+

=== International ===
Kazakhstan national team
Year	Apps	Goals
2008	2	0
2009	3	0
Total	5	0

Statistics accurate as of match played 6 June 2009
