= Kamo Hovhannisyan =

Armenian footballer (born 1992)

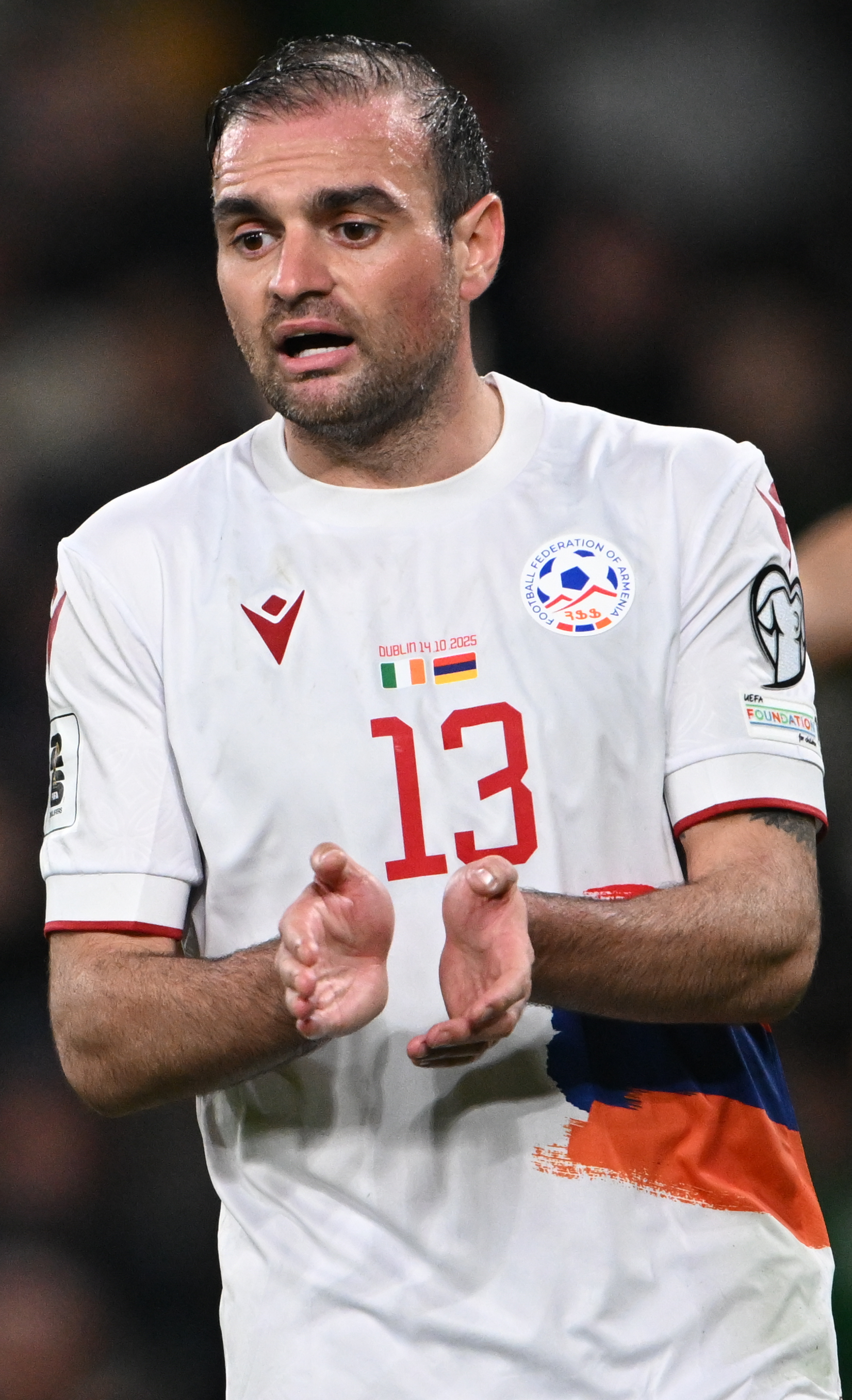
- Hovhannisyan with Armenia 2025

Personal information
- Full name: Kamo Artashesovich Hovhannisyan
- Date of birth: 5 October 1992 (age 34)
- Place of birth: Yerevan, Armenia
- Height: 1.77 m (5 ft 10 in)
- Positions: Midfielder; right-back

Team information
- Current team: Ararat-Armenia
- Number: 13

Youth career
- 2000–2001: Shengavit
- 2002–2007: Pyunik

Senior career*
Years	Team	Apps	(Gls)
2008–2009	Patani	15	(0)
2009–2010	Pyunik-2	5	(5)
2009–2016	Pyunik	175	(27)
2017	Torpedo-BelAZ Zhodino	28	(3)
2018–2019	Zhetysu	58	(6)
2020–2021	Kairat	39	(5)
2022–2023	Astana	42	(0)
2024–	Ararat-Armenia	59	(2)

International career^{‡}
2009	Armenia U17		
2009–2010	Armenia U19	5	(0)
2011–2013	Armenia U21	10	(1)
2012–	Armenia	97	(3)
- * Club domestic league appearances and goals as of 8 July 2026 ‡ National team caps and goals as of 9 June 2026

Kamo Hovhannisyan (Armenian: Կամո Հովհաննիսյան, born on 5 October 1992) is an Armenian professional footballer who plays as a midfielder for Armenian Premier League club Ararat-Armenia and the Armenia national team.

== Club career ==
Kamo Hovhannisyan was born in Yerevan to parents Artashes and Gayane Hovhannisyan. He began to get involved in football at the age of 6, and two years later, he was admitted to the football school Shengavit. Shengavit was chosen due to the proximity of schools to home. His younger brother Hovhannes also followed in his footsteps. After two years in Shengavit, he moved to football school Pyunik at the urging of his father. In the 2008 season, Hovhannisyan played for the club Patani, which assembled youth team players up to age 17. The following season, he moved back to Pyunik. Hovhannisyan played mostly in the duplicate team, which played in the First League. In 2009, he had been awarded a contract with Pyunik. His debut for the main club was in the 2009 season, on 7 April, in the return game in the Armenian Cup quarterfinals against Cilicia. Hovhannisyan's Armenian Premier League debut was four days later, again against Cilicia. In both matches, Pyunik was the winner. On 12 July 2011, he made his debut in the Champions League match against Czech club Viktoria Plzeň, which ended in a 4–0 defeat for Pyunik.

On 16 January 2018, FC Alashkert announced that Hovhannisyan joined the club on a contract expiring on 1 August 2020. However, on 23 January 2018, Hovhannisyan joined FC Zhetysu of the Kazakhstan Premier League. On 11 January 2020, Hovhannisyan joined FC Kairat of the Kazakhstan Premier League on a two-year contract.

On 19 January 2022, Hovhannisyan signed for Astana. On 29 December 2022, Hovhannisyan extended his contract with Astana for the 2023 season. On 18 January 2024, Astana announced that Hovhannisyan had left the club.

On 20 January 2024, Hovhannisyan returned to the Armenian Premier League, signing for FC Ararat-Armenia.

== International career ==
Hovhannisyan made his debut for the Armenia national team on 28 February 2012 in a friendly match against Serbia.

On 9 September 2025, Hovhannisyan played his 90th match for the national team, becoming only the fifth player in the history of the Armenian team to reach this mark.

== Career statistics ==
=== Club ===
As of match played 21 July 2026

Appearances and goals by club, season and competition
Club	Season	League			National cup		Continental		Other		Total	
Club	Season	Division	Apps	Goals	Apps	Goals	Apps	Goals	Apps	Goals	Apps	Goals
Patani	2008	Armenian First League	15	0			—		—		15	0
Pyunik-2	2009	Armenian First League	5	5	—		—		—		5	5
Pyunik	2009	Armenian Premier League	4	0			—		—		4	0
Pyunik	2010	Armenian Premier League	16	0	4	0	0 (Note: Appearances and goals in the UEFA Champions League)	0	1 (Note: Appearance in the Armenian Super Cup)	0	21	0
Pyunik	2011	Armenian Premier League	25	0	2	0	2	0	—		27	0
Pyunik	2012–13	Armenian Premier League	42	10	5	1	2 (Note: Appearances and goals in the UEFA Europa League)	0	—		49	11
Pyunik	2013–14	Armenian Premier League	22	3	5	1	2	0	1	0	28	4
Pyunik	2014–15	Armenian Premier League	26	9	5	0	2	0	—		33	9
Pyunik	2015–16	Armenian Premier League	26	3	2	0	4	1	—		32	4
Pyunik	2016–17	Armenian Premier League	14	2	2	2	2	0	—		18	4
Pyunik	Total		175	27	25	4	14	1	2	0	216	32
Torpedo-BelAZ Zhodino	2017	Belarusian Premier League	28	3	3	1	—		1 (Note: Appearance in the Belarusian Super Cup)	0	32	4
Zhetysu	2018	Kazakhstan Premier League	31	1	0	0	—		—		31	1
Zhetysu	2019	Kazakhstan Premier League	27	5	0	0	—		—		27	5
Zhetysu	Total		58	6	0	0	-	-	-	-	58	6
Kairat	2020	Kazakhstan Premier League	14	1	0	0	1	0	0	0	15	1
Kairat	2021	Kazakhstan Premier League	25	4	6	0	12 (Note: Two appearances in the UEFA Champions League, four appearances in the UEFA Europa League, and six appearances and 1 goal in the UEFA Europa Conference League)	1	1 (Note: Appearance in the Kazakhstan Super Cup)	0	44	5
Kairat	Total		39	5	6	0	13	1	1	0	59	6
Astana	2022	Kazakhstan Premier League	24	0	2	0	0 (Note: Appearance in the UEFA Europa Conference League)	0	—		26	0
Astana	2023	Kazakhstan Premier League	18	0	5	0	14 (Note: Four appearances in the UEFA Champions League and two appearances in the UEFA Europa League, and eight appearances and two goals in the UEFA Europa Conference League.)	2	1	0	38	2
Astana	Total		42	0	7	0	14	2	1	0	64	2
Ararat-Armenia	2023–24	Armenian Premier League	14	1	3	0	0	0	—		17	1
Ararat-Armenia	2024–25	Armenian Premier League	23	0	5	0	4	0	1	0	33	0
Ararat-Armenia	2025–26	Armenian Premier League	22	1	3	0	4	1	1	0	30	2
Ararat-Armenia	2026–27	Armenian Premier League	0	0	0	0	3	0	0	0	3	0
Ararat-Armenia	Total		59	2	11	0	11	1	2	0	83	3
Career total			421	48	52	5	52	5	7	0	532	58

=== International ===
As of match played 9 June 2026

Appearances and goals by national team and year
National team	Year	Apps	Goals
Armenia	2012	5	0
Armenia	2013	9	0
Armenia	2014	6	0
Armenia	2015	6	0
Armenia	2016	4	0
Armenia	2017	7	0
Armenia	2018	5	0
Armenia	2019	8	0
Armenia	2020	4	1
Armenia	2021	11	1
Armenia	2022	8	1
Armenia	2023	5	0
Armenia	2024	8	0
Armenia	2025	8	0
Armenia	2026	3	0
Total		97	3

Scores and results list Armenia's goal tally first, score column indicates score after each Hovhannisyan goal.

List of international goals scored by Kamo Hovhannisyan
No.	Date	Venue	Opponent	Score	Result	Competition
1	14 October 2020	A. Le Coq Arena, Tallinn, Estonia	Estonia	1–0	1–1	2020–21 UEFA Nations League C
2	8 October 2021	Laugardalsvöllur, Reykjavík, Iceland	Iceland	1–0	1–1	2022 FIFA World Cup qualification
3	16 November 2022	Fadil Vokrri Stadium, Pristina, Kosovo	Kosovo	2–1	2–2	Friendly

== Honours ==
Pyunik

- Armenian Premier League: 2009, 2010
- Armenian Cup: 2009, 2010
- Armenian Supercup: 2010; runner-up 2009

Ararat-Armenia

- Armenian Premier League: 2025–26
- Armenian Cup: 2023–24
- Armenian Supercup: 2024

Kairat

- Kazakhstan Premier League: 2020
- Kazakhstan Cup: 2021

Astana

- Kazakhstan Super Cup: 2023
