= Almat Bekbayev =

Kazakh football player

Personal information
- Full name: Almat Maratuly Bekbayev
- Date of birth: 14 June 1984 (age 42)
- Place of birth: Kyzylorda, Kazakh SSR
- Height: 1.95 m (6 ft 5 in)
- Position: Goalkeeper

Senior career*
Years	Team	Apps	(Gls)
2002	Dostyk	24	(0)
2003	Yassi	0	(0)
2004	Kaisar	2	(0)
2005	Ordabasy	1	(0)
2006–2007	Akzhayik	33	(0)
2007	Andijon	6	(0)
2008–2012	Ordabasy	52	(0)
2013	Tobol	16	(0)
2014–2015	Aktobe	1	(0)
2016–2017	Ordabasy	36	(0)
2018	Irtysh Pavlodar	1	(0)
2018–2021	Zhetysu	43	(0)
2021–2022	Kyzylzhar	2	(0)
2022	Maktaaral	3	(0)

International career
2012	Kazakhstan	1	(0)
- * Club domestic league appearances and goals

Almat Maratuly Bekbayev (Kazakh: Алмат Маратұлы Бекбаев, Almat Maratūly Bekbaev; born 14 June 1984) is a Kazakh former football player who played as a goalkeeper.

== Career ==
=== Club ===
In April 2014, Bekbayev signed for FC Aktobe, returning to FC Ordabasy in February 2016.

Bekbayev was released by FC Irtysh Pavlodar on 1 July 2018.

== Career statistics ==
=== Club ===
As of match played 10 November 2019

Appearances and goals by club, season and competition
Club	Season	League			National Cup		Continental		Other		Total	
Club	Season	Division	Apps	Goals	Apps	Goals	Apps	Goals	Apps	Goals	Apps	Goals
Dostyk	2002	Kazakhstan First Division	24	0			–		–		24	0
Ordabasy	2003	Kazakhstan Premier League	0	0			–		–		0	0
Yassi	2004	Kazakhstan Premier League	2	0			–		–		2	0
Kaisar	2005	Kazakhstan Premier League	1	0			–		–		1	0
Akzhayik	2006	Kazakhstan Premier League	23	0			-		-		23	0
Akzhayik	2007	Kazakhstan Premier League	10	0			-		-		10	0
Akzhayik	Total		33	0			-	-	-	-	33	0
Andijon	2007	Uzbek League	6	0			–		–		6	0
Tobol	2008	Kazakhstan Premier League	20	0			-		-		20	0
Tobol	2009	Kazakhstan Premier League	0	0			-		-		0	0
Tobol	2010	Kazakhstan Premier League	2	0			-		-		2	0
Tobol	2011	Kazakhstan Premier League	6	0	4	0	-		-		10	0
Tobol	2012	Kazakhstan Premier League	24	0	2	0	4	0	1	0	31	0
Tobol	Total		52	0	6	0	4	0	1	0	63	0
Tobol	2013	Kazakhstan Premier League	16	0	2	0	–		–		18	0
Aktobe	2014	Kazakhstan Premier League	1	0	0	0	0	0	0	0	1	0
Aktobe	2015	Kazakhstan Premier League	0	0	0	0	2	0	-		2	0
Aktobe	Total		1	0	0	0	2	0	0	0	3	0
Ordabasy	2016	Kazakhstan Premier League	16	0	1	0	0	0	-		17	0
Ordabasy	2017	Kazakhstan Premier League	20	0	3	0	2	0	-		25	0
Ordabasy	Total		36	0	4	0	2	0	-	-	42	0
Irtysh Pavlodar	2018	Kazakhstan Premier League	1	0	1	0	0	0	–		2	0
Zhetysu	2018	Kazakhstan Premier League	13	0	0	0	–		–		13	0
Zhetysu	2019	Kazakhstan Premier League	20	0	0	0	–		–		20	0
Zhetysu	Total		33	0	0	0	-	-	-	-	33	0
Career total			205	0	13	0	8	0	1	0	227	0

=== International ===
Kazakhstan national team
Year	Apps	Goals
2012	1	0
Total	1	0

Statistics accurate as of match played 1 June 2012
