= Yermek Kuantayev =

Kazakhstani footballer

Personal information
- Full name: Yermek Bolatkhanuly Kuantayev
- Date of birth: 13 October 1990 (age 36)
- Place of birth: Kostanay, Kazakh SSR
- Height: 1.74 m (5 ft 9 in)
- Position: Defender

Team information
- Current team: Taraz
- Number: 61

Senior career*
Years	Team	Apps	(Gls)
2009–2013	Tobol	99	(4)
2014–2018	Kairat	71	(4)
2018	→ Zhetysu (loan)	21	(0)
2019–2021	Zhetysu	38	(0)
2021	Turan	2	(0)
2021–	Taraz	3	(0)

International career^{‡}
2015–	Kazakhstan	1	(0)
- * Club domestic league appearances and goals as of 28 April 2021 ‡ National team caps and goals as of 15 December 2017

Yermek Bolatkhanuly Kuantayev (Kazakh: Ермек Болатханұлы Қуантаев, Ermek Bolathanūly Quantaev; born 13 October 1990) is a Kazakh football player who plays for FC Taraz as a defender, and the Kazakhstan.

== Career statistics ==
=== Club ===
As of match played 10 November 2019

Appearances and goals by club, season and competition
Club	Season	League			National Cup		Continental		Other		Total	
Club	Season	Division	Apps	Goals	Apps	Goals	Apps	Goals	Apps	Goals	Apps	Goals
Tobol	2009	Kazakhstan Premier League	0	0			-		-		0	0
Tobol	2010	Kazakhstan Premier League	27	3			2	0	-		29	3
Tobol	2011	Kazakhstan Premier League	25	0	3	0	2	0	1	0	31	0
Tobol	2012	Kazakhstan Premier League	20	1	3	0	-		-		23	1
Tobol	2013	Kazakhstan Premier League	27	0	1	0	-		-		28	0
Tobol	Total		99	4	7	0	4	0	2	0	112	4
Kairat	2014	Kazakhstan Premier League	25	2	4	1	2	0	0	0	31	3
Kairat	2015	Kazakhstan Premier League	25	2	2	0	8	1	1	0	36	3
Kairat	2016	Kazakhstan Premier League	16	0	2	0	3	0	1	0	22	0
Kairat	2017	Kazakhstan Premier League	5	0	2	0	0	0	0	0	7	0
Kairat	2018	Kazakhstan Premier League	0	0	0	0	0	0	0	0	0	0
Kairat	Total		71	4	10	1	13	1	2	0	96	6
Zhetysu (loan)	2018	Kazakhstan Premier League	21	0	0	0	–		–		21	0
Zhetysu	2019	Kazakhstan Premier League	27	0	0	0	–		–		27	0
Career total			218	8	17	1	17	1	4	0	256	10

=== International ===
Kazakhstan national team
Year	Apps	Goals
2015	1	0
Total	1	0

Statistics accurate as of match played 28 March 2015
