= Aslan Darabayev =

Kazakhstani footballer

Personal information
- Full name: Aslan Kayratuly Darabayev
- Date of birth: 21 January 1989 (age 37)
- Place of birth: Karaganda, Kazakh SSR, Soviet Union
- Height: 1.79 m (5 ft 10 in)
- Position: Winger

Team information
- Current team: Turan
- Number: 6

Senior career*
Years	Team	Apps	(Gls)
2008–2009	Shakhter Karagandy	45	(4)
2010–2012	Aktobe	51	(6)
2013	Atyrau	8	(0)
2013	Shakhter Karagandy	14	(0)
2014–2016	Kairat	58	(10)
2017	Irtysh Pavlodar	31	(5)
2018	Tobol	26	(2)
2019	Irtysh Pavlodar	7	(1)
2019–2021	Zhetysu	35	(3)
2021–2022	Caspiy	24	(4)
2022–2023	Astana	38	(3)
2024	Elimai	11	(1)
2025	Okzhetpes	12	(0)
2025–	Turan	11	(0)

International career^{‡}
2014–	Kazakhstan	24	(1)
- * Club domestic league appearances and goals as of 2 November 2025 ‡ National team caps and goals as of 14 November 2024

Aslan Kayratuly Darabayev (Kazakh: Аслан Қайратұлы Дарабаев, Aslan Qairatūly Darabaev; born 21 January 1989) is a Kazakh footballer who plays as a winger for Turan.

== Career ==
=== Club ===
On 28 December 2018, Darabayev signed for FC Irtysh Pavlodar, leaving by mutual consent on 3 May 2019.

On 26 June 2019, Darabayev signed for Zhetysu.

== Career statistics ==
=== Club ===
As of match played 30 October 2021

Appearances and goals by club, season and competition
Club	Season	League			National Cup		Continental		Other		Total	
Club	Season	Division	Apps	Goals	Apps	Goals	Apps	Goals	Apps	Goals	Apps	Goals
Shakhter Karagandy	2008	Kazakhstan Premier League	19	1			–		–		19	1
Shakhter Karagandy	2009	Kazakhstan Premier League	26	3			–		–		26	3
Shakhter Karagandy	Total		45	4			-	-	-	-	45	4
Aktobe	2010	Kazakhstan Premier League	32	5			4	0	1	0	37	5
Aktobe	2011	Kazakhstan Premier League	10	1			0	0	–		10	1
Aktobe	2012	Kazakhstan Premier League	9	0			0	0	–		9	0
Aktobe	Total		51	6			4	0	1	0	56	6
Atyrau	2013	Kazakhstan Premier League	8	0			–		–		8	0
Shakhter Karagandy	2013	Kazakhstan Premier League	14	0	1	0	3	0	0	0	18	0
Kairat	2014	Kazakhstan Premier League	25	8	6	3	1	1	–		32	12
Kairat	2015	Kazakhstan Premier League	17	1	3	0	2	0	1	0	23	1
Kairat	2016	Kazakhstan Premier League	16	1	2	1	0	0	1	0	19	2
Kairat	Total		58	10	11	4	3	1	2	0	74	15
Irtysh Pavlodar	2017	Kazakhstan Premier League	31	5	1	0	4	1	–		36	6
Tobol	2018	Kazakhstan Premier League	26	2	2	0	2	1	–		30	3
Irtysh Pavlodar	2019	Kazakhstan Premier League	7	1	1	0	–		–		8	1
Zhetysu	2019	Kazakhstan Premier League	17	2	0	0	–		–		17	2
Zhetysu	2020	Kazakhstan Premier League	17	1	0	0	–		–		17	1
Zhetysu	Total		34	3	0	0	-	-	-	-	34	3
Caspiy	2021	Kazakhstan Premier League	24	4	7	1	–		–		31	5
Career total			298	35	23	5	16	1	3	0	340	41

=== International ===
Kazakhstan
Year	Apps	Goals
2014	2	0
2015	1	0
2016	0	0
2017	3	0
2018	0	0
2019	0	0
2020	2	0
2021	1	0
Total	9	0

Statistics accurate as of match played 16 November 2021

=== International goals ===
Scores and results list Kazakhstan's goal tally first.

No.	Date	Venue	Opponent	Score	Result	Competition
1.	6 June 2022	Anton Malatinský Stadium, Trnava, Slovakia	Slovakia	1–0	1–0	2022–23 UEFA Nations League
