= Aybar Zhaksylykov =

Kazakhstani footballer

Personal information
- Full name: Aybar Bolatuly Zhaksylykov
- Date of birth: 24 July 1997 (age 29)
- Place of birth: Taldykorgan, Kazakhstan
- Height: 1.84 m (6 ft 0 in)
- Position: Forward

Team information
- Current team: Yelimay
- Number: 19

Youth career
- –2017: Zhetysu

Senior career*
Years	Team	Apps	(Gls)
2018–	Zhetysu B	40	(21)
2019–2022	Zhetysu	56	(15)
2022–2023	Tobol	23	(3)
2023	Ordabasy	14	(2)
2024–2025	Kaisar	48	(15)
2026–	Yelimay	25	(5)

International career^{‡}
2020–	Kazakhstan	18	(0)
- * Club domestic league appearances and goals as of 1 November 2026 ‡ National team caps and goals as of 14 November 2026

Aybar Bolatuly Zhaksylykov (Kazakh: Айбар Болатұлы Жақсылықов, Aibar Bolatūly Jaqsylyqov; born 24 July 1997) is a Kazakhstani footballer who plays as a forward for Yelimay.

== Club career ==
Zhaksylykov made his professional debut for Zhetysu in the Kazakhstan Premier League on 9 March 2019, coming on as a substitute in the 85th minute for Ivaylo Dimitrov against Okzhetpes. Two minutes later Zhaksylykov scored for Zhetysu, with the match finishing as a 5–1 home win.

== International career ==
Zhaksylykov made his international debut for Kazakhstan on 11 October 2020 in the UEFA Nations League, coming on as a substitute in the 86th minute for Baktiyar Zaynutdinov against Albania. The home match finished as a 0–0 draw.

== Career statistics ==
=== International ===
As of 14 October 2020

Kazakhstan
Year	Apps	Goals
2020	2	0
Total	2	0
