= Vadim Pobudey =

Belarusian footballer

Personal information
- Date of birth: 17 December 1994 (age 31)
- Place of birth: Ostrov, Gantsevichi Raion, Brest Oblast, Belarus
- Height: 1.82 m (5 ft 11 1/2 in)
- Position: Midfielder

Team information
- Current team: Torpedo-BelAZ Zhodino
- Number: 30

Youth career
- 2008–2009: Granit Mikashevichi
- 2010–2013: FC Gantsevichi

Senior career*
| Years | Team | Apps | (Gls) |
| 2013–2015 | Baranovichi | 65 | (6) |
| 2016 | Dinamo Brest | 21 | (2) |
| 2017–2018 | Isloch Minsk Raion | 37 | (3) |
| 2019 | Dnyapro Mogilev | 28 | (4) |
| 2020 | Zhetysu | 14 | (1) |
| 2021 | Gomel | 29 | (7) |
| 2022– | Torpedo-BelAZ Zhodino | 123 | (10) |

International career^{‡}
| 2014–2015 | Belarus U21 | 5 | (0) |
| 2021 | Belarus | 1 | (0) |
- * Club domestic league appearances and goals as of 3 July 2026 ‡ National team caps and goals as of 11 October 2021

Vadim Pobudey (Belarusian: Вадзім Пабудзей; Russian: Вадим Побудей; born 17 December 1994) is a Belarusian professional footballer who plays for Torpedo-BelAZ Zhodino.

== International career ==
He made his debut for the Belarus national football team on 8 October 2021 in a World Cup qualifier against Estonia.

== Honours ==
Dinamo Brest

- Belarusian Cup winner: 2016–17

Gomel

- Belarusian Cup winner: 2021–22
