= Jetisu Stadium =

Multi-use stadium in Kazakhstan

- Interactive map of Jetisu Stadium
- Location: Taldıqorğan, Kazakhstan
- Coordinates: 45°01′11″N 78°21′54″E
- Owner: Municipality of Taldıqorğan
- Capacity: 4,000
- Surface: Grass; 110 m × 72 m (361 ft × 236 ft)
- Record attendance: 6,000 (FC Jetisu-FC Shakhter Karagandy, 22 October 2011

Construction
- Opened: 1982; 44 years ago

Tenant
- FC Jetisu

Jetisu Stadium (Kazakh: Жетісу стадионы, Jetisu stadıony) is a multi-use stadium in Taldıqorğan, Kazakhstan. It is currently used mostly for football matches and hosts the home matches of FC Zhetysu.
