= Andrei Kharabara =

Russian footballer

Personal information
- Full name: Andrei Vladimirovich Kharabara
- Date of birth: 1 September 1985 (age 41)
- Place of birth: Novodnistrovsk, Soviet Union
- Height: 1.71 m (5 ft 7 in)
- Position: Midfielder

Senior career*
Years	Team	Apps	(Gls)
2002–2004	Neftekhimik Nizhnekamsk	76	(3)
2005–2010	Tobol	97	(6)
2011	Zhetysu	27	(1)
2012	Kairat	9	(0)
2012	Sunkar	8	(0)
2013–2014	Aktobe	27	(2)
2015	Ahro Synkiv		
2016	15 Hromada Rudanske		
2017–2019	Zhetysu	15	(0)
- * Club domestic league appearances and goals

Andrei Vladimirovich Kharabara (Russian: Андрей Владимирович Харабара; born 1 September 1985) is a Russian former professional footballer.

== Honours ==
Aktobe

- Kazakhstan Super Cup (1): 2014
