= Oleg Hromțov =

Moldovan footballer

Personal information
- Full name: Oleg Hromțov
- Date of birth: 30 May 1983 (age 43)
- Place of birth: Rîbnița, Moldovan SSR
- Height: 1.88 m (6 ft 2 in)
- Position: Forward

Senior career*
Years	Team	Apps	(Gls)
2000–2004	Tiligul-Tiras Tiraspol	63	(8)
2004	Borysfen Boryspil	14	(1)
2005	Khimki	1	(0)
2005	Alania Vladikavkaz	0	(0)
2006	Tiligul-Tiras Tiraspol	7	(0)
2006	Dinamo Minsk	2	(0)
2007–2008	Dnipro Cherkasy	43	(5)
2008	Volyn Lutsk	13	(2)
2009	Kaisar	8	(2)
2009	Banants	2	(0)
2009	Turan Tovuz	6	(1)
2010	Găgăuzia Comrat	8	(4)
2011	Akzhayik	3	(1)
2012	Astana-1964	2	(0)
2012–2013	Kaisar	25	(8)
2014	Caspiy Aktau	21	(7)
2015–2016	Akzhayik	37	(16)
2016	Kaisar	18	(12)
2017–2019	Zhetysu	64	(17)
2020–2021	Akzhayik	11	(9)

International career
2004	Moldova U21	7	(1)
2004	Moldova	1	(0)
- * Club domestic league appearances and goals as of 31 December 2020

Oleg Hromțov (born 30 May 1983) is a former footballer who played as a midfielder. He has played for clubs in Moldova, Ukraine, Russia, Belarus, Kazakhstan, Armenia and Azerbaijan.

== Club career ==
Hromțov began playing football with Moldovan side CS Tiligul-Tiras Tiraspol. In 2004, he would move abroad to play in the Ukrainian Premier League for FC Borysfen Boryspil. He spent the next several seasons as a journeyman, playing in the Russian First Division for FC Khimki, Belarusian Premier League for FC Dinamo Minsk, Ukrainian First League with FC Dnipro Cherkasy and FC Volyn Lutsk, Kazakhstan Premier League with FC Kaisar, Armenian Premier League with FC Banants and Azerbaijan Premier League with PFC Turan Tovuz.

In 2020, Hromțov returned to FC Akzhayik.
