= Nikita Naumov =

Belarusian footballer

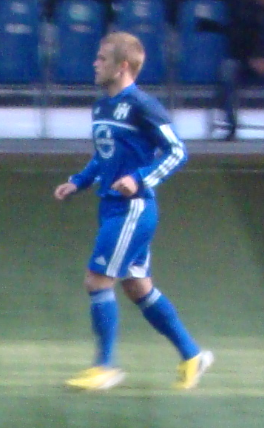

Personal information
- Date of birth: 15 November 1989 (age 36)
- Place of birth: Vitebsk, Belarusian SSR, Soviet Union
- Height: 1.94 m (6 ft 4 in)
- Position: Defender

Team information
- Current team: Maxline Vitebsk
- Number: 21

Youth career
- 2007–2010: Naftan Novopolotsk

Senior career*
Years	Team	Apps	(Gls)
2010–2015	Naftan Novopolotsk	107	(3)
2010	→ Polotsk (loan)	27	(3)
2011	→ Polotsk (loan)	13	(2)
2016–2018	Vitebsk	77	(5)
2019–2020	Zhetysu	47	(4)
2021–2022	Dinamo Minsk	34	(2)
2023	Kyzylzhar	20	(0)
2024–2026	Vitebsk	70	(1)
2026–	Maxline Vitebsk	0	(0)

International career^{‡}
2017	Belarus B	2	(0)
2017–2021	Belarus	14	(1)
- * Club domestic league appearances and goals as of 8 September 2026 ‡ National team caps and goals as of 16 November 2021

Nikita Naumov (Belarusian: Мiкiта Навумаў; Russian: Никита Наумов; born 15 November 1989) is a Belarusian footballer playing currently for Maxline Vitebsk.

== International career ==
=== International goals ===
Scores and results list Belarus' goal tally first.

No.	Date	Venue	Opponent	Score	Result	Competition
1.	6 September 2019	A. Le Coq Arena, Tallinn, Estonia	Estonia	1–0	2–1	UEFA Euro 2020 qualification

== Honours ==
Naftan Novopolotsk

- Belarusian Cup winner: 2011–12
