= Nenad Adamović =

Serbian footballer

Nenad Adamović Ненад Адамовић
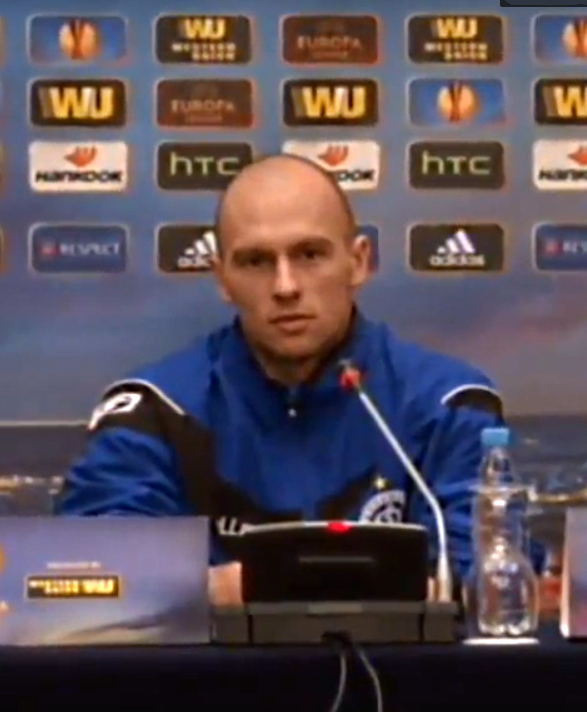
- Adamović with Dinamo Minsk in 2014

Personal information
- Full name: Nenad Adamović
- Date of birth: 12 January 1989 (age 37)
- Place of birth: Topola, SFR Yugoslavia
- Height: 1.70 m (5 ft 7 in)
- Position: Winger

Team information
- Current team: Bežanija

Youth career
- Karađorđe Topola
- 2002–2007: Partizan

Senior career*
| Years | Team | Apps | (Gls) |
| 2007–2010 | Partizan | 0 | (0) |
| 2007–2010 | → Teleoptik (loan) | 72 | (4) |
| 2010–2011 | Metalac Gornji Milanovac | 29 | (3) |
| 2011–2012 | Smederevo | 23 | (3) |
| 2012–2013 | Hajduk Kula | 26 | (6) |
| 2013–2016 | Dinamo Minsk | 80 | (20) |
| 2016–2017 | Maccabi Petah Tikva | 21 | (1) |
| 2017 | Čukarički | 9 | (0) |
| 2018 | Vitebsk | 24 | (1) |
| 2019–2020 | Zhetysu | 51 | (6) |
| 2021 | Taraz | 25 | (4) |
| 2022 | Neman Grodno | 18 | (1) |
| 2023 | Mladost Lučani | 11 | (1) |
| 2023 | Loznica | | |
| 2024 | Teleoptik | | |
| 2025– | Bežanija | | |

International career
| 2005–2006 | Serbia and Montenegro U17 (Note: Only official UEFA matches included) | 8 | (2) |
| 2006–2008 | Serbia U19 | 13 | (0) |
- * Club domestic league appearances and goals as of 27 May 2023

Nenad Adamović (Serbian Cyrillic: Ненад Адамовић; born 12 January 1989) is a Serbian professional footballer who plays as a winger for Bežanija.

At the age of 18, Adamović was selected to represent the European side at the 2007 UEFA-CAF Meridian Cup.

== Club career ==
Adamović started out with his hometown club Karađorđe Topola, before joining the youth system of Partizan in 2002. He signed his first professional contract with the club in January 2007, penning a five-year deal. However, Adamović failed to make a competitive debut for Partizan, spending several seasons on loan with their affiliated side Teleoptik.

Between 2010 and 2013, Adamović played for three Serbian SuperLiga clubs, namely Metalac Gornji Milanovac, Smederevo, and Hajduk Kula. He amassed a total of 78 appearances and scored 12 goals in the top flight of Serbian football.

In July 2013, Adamović moved abroad to Belarus and signed with Dinamo Minsk on a three-year deal. He immediately established himself as a first-team regular, playing the full 90 minutes in his official debut for the club in a 2–1 away league win over Gomel. During his time at Dinamo Minsk, Adamović scored a total of 20 league goals in 80 appearances.

In the summer of 2016, Adamović signed with Israeli club Maccabi Petah Tikva. He helped the side finish fourth in the 2016–17 Israeli Premier League, scoring once from 21 appearances.

On the last day of the 2017 summer transfer window, Adamović returned to Serbia and signed with Čukarički on a one-year deal. He moved back to Belarus at the beginning of the following year and joined Vitebsk.

== International career ==
Adamović represented Serbia and Montenegro at the 2006 UEFA Under-17 Championship. He was also capped for Serbia at under-19 level.
