= Martin Toshev =

Bulgarian footballer

Personal information
- Full name: Martin Vasilev Toshev
- Date of birth: 17 April 1990 (age 36)
- Place of birth: Krupnik, Bulgaria
- Height: 1.83 m (6 ft 0 in)
- Position: Forward

Team information
- Current team: Slivnishki Geroy
- Number: 9

Youth career
- CSKA Sofia

Senior career*
Years	Team	Apps	(Gls)
2007	CSKA Sofia	2	(0)
2008	1. FC Köln II	8	(1)
2008–2009	CSKA Sofia	14	(0)
2009–2012	Chernomorets Burgas	38	(2)
2012	Slavia Sofia	9	(0)
2013–2014	Septemvri Simitli	28	(14)
2014–2016	Pirin Blagoevgrad	59	(20)
2016–2017	Erzgebirge Aue	4	(0)
2017	→ VfR Aalen (loan)	7	(0)
2017–2018	Septemvri Sofia	32	(11)
2018–2019	Al-Ahed	14	(10)
2019	CSKA 1948	0	(0)
2019–2020	Zhetysu	28	(13)
2021	Academica Clinceni	1	(0)
2021	Shakhter Karagandy	10	(0)
2022	CSKA 1948	13	(2)
2022	CSKA 1948 II	1	(0)
2022	Spartak Varna	7	(0)
2023	Etar Veliko Tarnovo	35	(12)
2024	Septemvri Sofia	12	(5)
2024	Yantra Gabrovo	21	(17)
2025	Sportist Svoge	6	(1)
2025–2026	Kostinbrod	22	(8)
2026–	Slivnishki Geroy	12	(7)

International career
- Bulgaria U19
2009–2011	Bulgaria U21	4	(0)
- * Club domestic league appearances and goals as of 1 November 2026

Martin Toshev (Bulgarian: Мартин Тошев; born 17 April 1990) is a Bulgarian professional footballer who plays as a forward for Slivnishki Geroy Slivnitsa.

== Career ==
=== CSKA Sofia ===
He was raised in CSKA Sofia's youth teams. In January 2008 Toshev went to Germany and trained at 1. FC Köln's Youth Academy. However, after six months he returned to Bulgaria and signed his first professional three-year contract with CSKA. On 6 December 2008, Toshev scored his first goals for the "armymen" - he secured a brace in the 5:0 away rout against PFC Balkan Botevgrad in the 1/8 final of the Bulgarian Cup.

=== Chernomorets Burgas ===
Toshev transferred to Chernomorets Burgas, after the end of the 2008–09 season. On 12 July he signed a four-year deal for a €100,000. On 17 August 2009, Toshev made his debut for the team from Burgas after coming on as a substitute for Michel Mesquita in the 2:1 home win against Lokomotiv Plovdiv. On 21 August 2009, he assisted Kostadin Dyakov's equalizing goal in the 1:1 away draw against Beroe. On 12 September 2009, he scored his first goal for Chernomorets, opening the scoring in the 5:0 away win against Lokomotiv Mezdra. His last match for Chernomorets Burgas was on 11 April 2011 against OFC Sliven 2000, when he was seriously injured. In January 2012 he was released from Chernomorets Burgas.

=== Slavia Sofia ===
In March 2012 Toshev signed a contract with Slavia Sofia, playing 9 games for the club during the 2011/12 season.

=== Septemvri Sofia ===
On 8 July 2017, after spending the first half of the 2016–17 season in Erzgebirge Aue and the second on loan in VfR Aalen, Toshev returned to Bulgaria signing with the newly promoted to the Bulgarian First League team of Septemvri Sofia.

He made his debut for the team on 17 July 2017 in match against Dunav Ruse. He left the club at the end of 2017–18 season when his contract expired.

=== Ahed ===
In June 2018, Toshev signed with Lebanese champions Al-Ahed.He became the first ever Bulgarian player to play for Al-Ahed and for the Lebanese premier league.

=== CSKA 1948 and Zhetysu ===
Toshev joined CSKA 1948 in June 2019, but spent only a few weeks with the team before being signed by Zhetysu in Kazakhstan for 5 years.

== International career ==
Toshev has been capped for the Bulgaria U21 national team.

== Career statistics ==
As of match played 28 February 2025

Club	Season	League	Domestic		Cup		Continental		Other		Total	
Club	Season	League	Apps	Goals	Apps	Goals	Apps	Goals	Apps	Goals	Apps	Goals
CSKA Sofia	2006–07	A Group	2	0	0	0	0	0	–	–	2	0
Köln II	2007–08	Oberliga Nordrhein	8	1	0	0	–	–	–	–	8	1
CSKA Sofia	2008–09	A Group	14	0	3	2	–	–	1	0	18	2
Chernomorets Burgas	2009–10	A Group	23	2	0	0	–	–	–	–	23	2
Chernomorets Burgas	2010–11	A Group	15	0	2	0	–	–	–	–	17	0
Slavia Sofia	2011–12	A Group	9	0	0	0	–	–	–	–	9	0
Slavia Sofia	2012–13	A Group	0	0	0	0	–	–	–	–	0	0
Septemvri Simitli	2013–14	A OFG	28	14	0	0	–	–	–	–	28	14
Pirin Blagoevgrad	2014–15	B Group	26	10	1	0	–	–	–	–	27	10
Pirin Blagoevgrad	2015–16	A Group	33	10	1	0	–	–	–	–	34	10
Erzgebirge Aue	2016–17	2. Bundesliga	4	0	0	0	–	–	–	–	4	0
Aalen (loan)	2016–17	3. Liga	7	0	0	0	–	–	–	–	7	0
Septemvri Sofia	2017–18	First League	32	11	0	0	–	–	–	–	32	11
Al Ahed	2018–19	Lebanese Premier League	14	10	1	0	4	0	1	0	20	10
Zhetysu	2019	Kazakhstan Premier League	14	9	0	0	–	–	–	–	14	9
Zhetysu	2020	Kazakhstan Premier League	15	4	0	0	–	–	–	–	15	4
Academica	2020–21	Liga I	1	0	0	0	–	–	–	–	1	0
Shakhter Karagandy	2021	Kazakhstan Premier League	10	0	5	3	2	0	–	–	17	3
CSKA 1948 Sofia II	2021–22	Second League	1	0	–	–	–	–	–	–	1	0
CSKA 1948 Sofia	2021–22	First League	13	2	0	0	–	–	–	–	13	2
Spartak Varna	2022–23	First League	7	0	0	0	–	–	–	–	7	0
Etar Veliko Tarnovo	2022–23	Second League	17	10	–	–	–	–	–	–	17	10
Etar Veliko Tarnovo	2023–24	First League	18	2	2	0	–	–	–	–	20	2
Septemvri Sofia	2023–24	Second League	12	5	–	–	–	–	–	–	12	5
Yantra Gabrovo	2024–25	Second League	21	17	1	0	–	–	–	–	22	17
Sportist Svoge	2024–25	Second League	2	0	–	–	–	–	–	–	2	0
Career totals			346	107	16	5	6	0	2	0	370	112

== Honours and achievements ==
=== Club ===
CSKA Sofia

- Bulgarian Supercup: 2008

Al Ahed

- AFC Cup: 2019
- Lebanese Premier League: 2018–19
- Lebanese FA Cup: 2018–19
- Lebanese Super Cup: 2018
