= Andrey Lebedzew =

Belarusian footballer

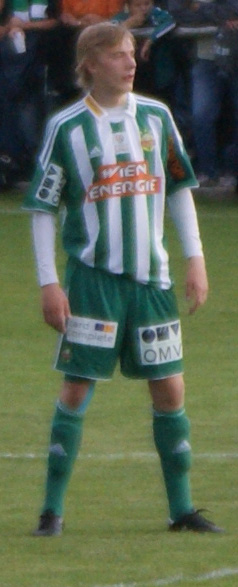

Personal information
- Full name: Andrey Lebedzew
- Date of birth: 1 February 1991 (age 35)
- Place of birth: Vitebsk, Byelorussian SSR, Soviet Union
- Height: 1.91 m (6 ft 3 in)
- Position: Defender

Team information
- Current team: Naftan Novopolotsk
- Number: 5

Youth career
- 2007–2009: Vitebsk

Senior career*
Years	Team	Apps	(Gls)
2008–2009	Vitebsk	10	(0)
2010–2013	Rapid Wien II	31	(2)
2011–2012	→ Lustenau 07 (loan)	16	(0)
2012–2013	→ First Vienna (loan)	30	(1)
2013–2014	First Vienna	47	(4)
2015	Naftan Novopolotsk	16	(1)
2016	Vitebsk	25	(1)
2017–2018	Dinamo Brest	38	(1)
2018–2020	Zhetysu	36	(0)
2021–2022	Vitebsk	33	(1)
2022	Minsk	11	(0)
2023	FC Khan-Tengri	9	(0)
2024–	Naftan Novopolotsk	72	(0)

International career
2010–2012	Belarus U21	13	(1)
- * Club domestic league appearances and goals as of 6 July 2026

Andrey Lebedzew (Belarusian: Андрэй Лебедзеў; Russian: Андрей Лебедев; born 1 February 1991) is a Belarusian professional footballer who plays for Naftan Novopolotsk.

== Honours ==
Dinamo Brest

- Belarusian Cup winner: 2016–17, 2017–18
- Belarusian Super Cup winner: 2018
