= Olzhas Kerimzhanov =

Kazakhstani footballer

Personal information
- Full name: Olzhas Bakytzhanuly Kerimzhanov
- Date of birth: 16 May 1989 (age 37)
- Place of birth: Asy, Kazakh SSR, Soviet Union
- Height: 1.86 m (6 ft 1 in)
- Position: Defender

Team information
- Current team: Kyzylzhar
- Number: 26

Senior career*
Years	Team	Apps	(Gls)
2008	Ile-Saulet	0	(0)
2008	Kairat	0	(0)
2009–2010	Lokomotiv Astana	9	(0)
2010	Okzhetpes	2	(0)
2011–2012	Ak Bulak	23	(3)
2013–2014	Okzhetpes	22	(5)
2015	Kyran	9	(1)
2015	Bolat-AMT	7	(0)
2016	Kaisar	18	(1)
2017–2021	Zhetysu	72	(7)
2021–2023	Turan	43	(3)
2023–2024	Atyrau	45	(1)
2025	Shakhter Karagandy	9	(2)
2025	Atyrau	11	(0)
2026–	Kyzylzhar	13	(0)

International career^{‡}
2019–	Kazakhstan	1	(0)
- * Club domestic league appearances and goals as of 1 November 2026 ‡ National team caps and goals as of 13 October 2019

Olzhas Bakytzhanuly Kerimzhanov (Kazakh: Олжас Бақытжанұлы Керімжанов, Oljas Baqytjanūly Kerımjanov; born 16 May 1989) is a Kazakhstani professional footballer who plays for Kyzylzhar.

== International ==
He was first called up to Kazakhstan national football team in June 2019 for games against Belgium and San Marino, but remained on the bench. He made his debut on 13 October 2019 in a Euro 2020 qualifier against Belgium. He started the game and played the whole game as Kazakhstan lost 0–2.
