= Taldykorgan =

Taldykorgan Талдықорған (Kazakh) Талдыкорган (Russian)
- City
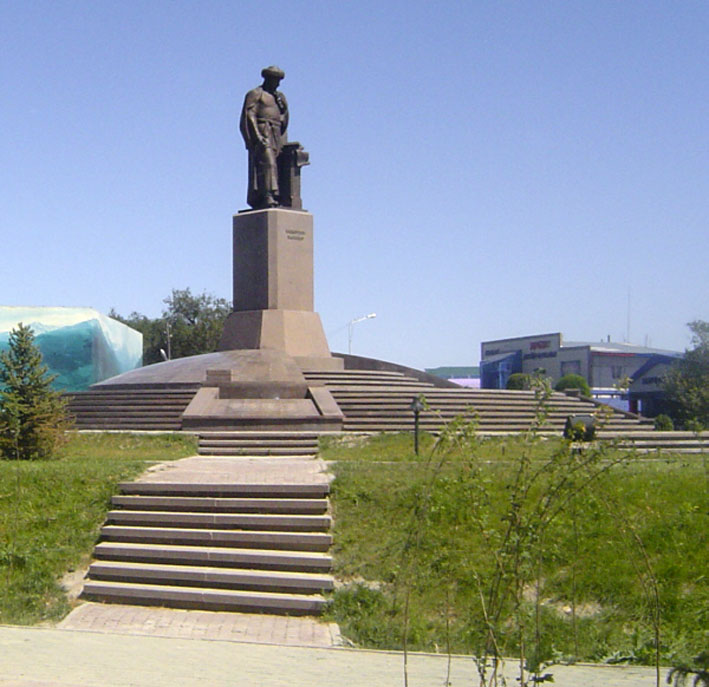

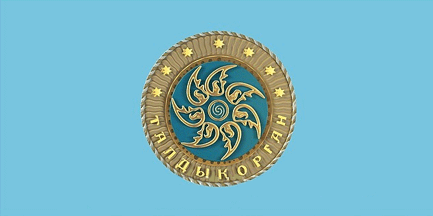
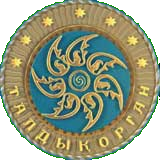
- Flag Seal

- Location in Kazakhstan
- Coordinates: 45°01′0″N 78°22′0″E
- Country: Kazakhstan
- Region: Jetisu Region
- Founded: 1868
- City status: 1944

Government
  - Akim: Yernat Basil

Area
  - City: 74 km^{2} (29 sq mi)
- Elevation: 600 m (2,000 ft)

Population (2013)
  - City: 129,960
  - Density: 1,184/km^{2} (3,070/sq mi)
  - Metro: 146,844
- Time zone: UTC+5 (East)
- Postal code: 040000 - 040012
- Area code: 72822
- Vehicle registration: B, V, 05
- Website: www.taldykorgan.gov.kz

Taldykorgan (Kazakh: Талдықорған, Taldyqorğan, pronounced [tɑɫˌdəqorˈʁɑn]; Russian: Талдыкорган), formerly spelled Taldy-Kurgan until 1993, is the capital (called an administrative center) of Jetisu Region, Kazakhstan. According to the 2010 Kazakh Census, the population is 143,407.

The town was founded in the 19th century as the village of Gavrilovka and developed into the present city on the same site. The town grew slowly in its early years. After the completion of the railway connection many Russian farmers moved to the area of the town. Russians are the second-largest ethnic group after the Kazakhs among the 70 nationalities living in Taldykorgan. A total of 143,000 people live in the city. Taldykorgan previously served as the capital city of Taldykorgan Region from 1944 to 1997 and Almaty Region from 1997 to 2022 and now serves as the capital of the new Jetisu Region. The change was announced by President Tokayev on 16 March 2022 and officially came into force on 8 June 2022. In that same decree, the capital of Almaty Region was moved to the city of Konaev.

During WWII, Taldykorgan also served as a temporary home for thousands of evacuees from the Soviet Union's western regions. Thousands of women and children from Southern Ukraine, including a significant number of Jewish people from Odessa, were able to evacuate by ship to Novorossiysk and travel inland by train to Uzbekistan and Kazakhstan.

== Facilities ==
Taldykorgan has a diverse range of educational facilities, including a university, institutes, institutions, technical training colleges, secondary schools and kindergartens. There are 27 public health facilities, a city cinema, a theatre, libraries, amusement parks, a stadium and sports complex and swimming pools. Some facilities have been poorly maintained since the end of the Soviet era.

== Demographics ==
The ethnic composition of Taldykorgan according to the 2010 Kazakh Census was:

Ethnicity	Population	Percentage of Population
Kazakhs	93,156	64.96%
Russians	36,532	25.47%
Koreans	5,172	3.61%
Tatars	2,783	1.94%
Germans	1,581	1.10%
Ukrainians	1,071	0.75%
Uyghurs	962	0.67%
Chechens	354	0.25%
Uzbeks	302	0.21%
Belarusians	177	0.12%
Azerbaijanis	130	0.09%
Poles	123	0.09%
Kyrgyz	102	0.07%
Other/Unknown	962	0.67%
Total	143,407	100%

== Climate ==
According to the Köppen climate classification system, Taldıqorğan has a hot, dry-summer continental climate (Dfa). There is more rainfall in spring and autumn while winter and summer have mostly dry weather. The average annual temperature in Taldıqorğan is 7.7 °C (45.9 °F). About 370 mm (14.57 in) of precipitation falls annually.

Climate data for Taldykorgan (1991–2020)
Month	Jan	Feb	Mar	Apr	May	Jun	Jul	Aug	Sep	Oct	Nov	Dec	Year
Mean daily maximum °C (°F)	−1.8 (28.8)	0.7 (33.3)	8.9 (48.0)	18.7 (65.7)	24.3 (75.7)	29.9 (85.8)	31.9 (89.4)	30.9 (87.6)	25.3 (77.5)	17.8 (64.0)	7.9 (46.2)	0.3 (32.5)	16.2 (61.2)
Daily mean °C (°F)	−8.5 (16.7)	−5.4 (22.3)	2.5 (36.5)	11.7 (53.1)	17.3 (63.1)	22.6 (72.7)	24.5 (76.1)	23.0 (73.4)	17.1 (62.8)	9.8 (49.6)	1.5 (34.7)	−5.9 (21.4)	9.2 (48.5)
Mean daily minimum °C (°F)	−14.5 (5.9)	−10.6 (12.9)	−2.8 (27.0)	5.0 (41.0)	10.1 (50.2)	15.0 (59.0)	16.9 (62.4)	14.5 (58.1)	9.3 (48.7)	3.2 (37.8)	−3.2 (26.2)	−11.0 (12.2)	2.7 (36.8)
Average precipitation mm (inches)	33.5 (1.32)	36.9 (1.45)	40.0 (1.57)	40.5 (1.59)	38.8 (1.53)	30.2 (1.19)	31.1 (1.22)	18.4 (0.72)	15.8 (0.62)	34.3 (1.35)	49.6 (1.95)	40.9 (1.61)	409.8 (16.13)
Average precipitation days (≥ 1.0 mm)	6.5	6.4	6.0	6.3	5.8	5.2	5.2	3.1	3.1	4.8	7.0	7.4	66.8
Source: NOAA,

== Transport ==
Taldykorgan Airport services Astana. Its train station services Central Kazakhstan, Central Asia, Russia, the Baltic States and the People's Republic of China.

== Sport ==
The city has a football club, FC Zhetysu Taldykorgan.

== Notable residents ==
- Andrei Kivilev (1973 - 2003) - professional bicycle racer.
- Sergey Vodopyanov (born 1987) - Russian amateur boxer, winner gold in bantamweight Class at the 2007 World Amateur Boxing Championships.
- Alibek Buleshev (born 1981) - Kazakh football forward.
- Mirat Sarsembayev (born 1986) - amateur boxer from Kazakhstan, best known for winning the flyweight bronze at the 2005 World Amateur Boxing Championships.
- Victor Sydorenko (born 1953) - painter, curator, teacher, an author of objects and photocompositions and also scientific and publicistic texts, member and the vice-president of Ukrainian Academy of Arts.
- Marian Handwerker (born 1944) film director born in Taldykorgan

== Sister cities ==
- Antalya, Turkey.
- (England) Manchester, United Kingdom.
