= 2021 FC Akzhayik season =

FC Akzhayik
2021 season
- Chairman: Rashid Khusnutdinov
- Manager: Volodymyr Mazyar
- Stadium: Petr Atoyan Stadium
- Premier League: 9th
- Kazakhstan Cup: Group stage
- Top goalscorer: League: Mykola Kovtalyuk (6); All: Mykola Kovtalyuk (7)
- Highest home attendance: 2,000 vs Tobol (30 October 2021)
- Lowest home attendance: 0 vs Atyrau (20 March 2021) 0 vs Kyzylzhar (9 April 2021); 0 vs Aktobe (24 April 2021); 0 vs Zhetysu (3 May 2021) 0 vs Kairat (14 May 2021)
- Average home league attendance: 923 (30 October 2021)
Home colours	Away colours

The 2021 FC Akzhayik season was Akzhayik's 1st season back in the Kazakhstan Premier League, the highest tier of association football in Kazakhstan, following their relegation from the league in 2018.

== Season events ==
On 19 February, Akzhayik announced the signing of Miram Sapanov from Zhetysu, and Yerkin Tapalov from Shakhter Karagandy.

The following day, 20 February, Akzhayik announced the signings of Pavel Nazarenko from Vitebsk, Sergey Shustikov from Torpedo Moscow, Soslan Takulov from Shakhter Karagandy, Yevgeni Yatskiy from Akron Tolyatti, Oleksiy Chychykov from Dnipro-1, and Marat Burayev. Whilst Serhiy Litovchenko signed for the club on 21 February.

On 27 February, Akzhayik announced the signing of Nauryzbek Zhagorov from Ekibastuz.

On 2 March Magomed Paragulgov joined Akzhayik from Ermis Aradippou, Yevgeni Kozlov joined from Ventspils, Vyacheslav Shvyrev on loan from Kairat, and Dmitri Michurenkov from Nizhny Novgorod.

On 4 March, Akzhayik announced the signings of Artem Baranovskyi and Mykola Kovtalyuk.

On 1 July, Akzhayik announced the signings of Ștefan Sicaci, Mikhail Gashchenkov and Luka Imnadze.

On 23 August, Akzhayik announced the signing of Reginaldo from Shkupi.

== Squad ==
As of match played 30 October 2021

No.	Name	Nationality	Position	Date of birth (age)	Signed from	Signed in	Contract ends	Apps.	Goals
Goalkeepers
1	Serhiy Litovchenko	(Ukraine)	GK	4 October 1987 (age 38)	Unattached	2021		19	0
88	Ștefan Sicaci	(Moldova)	GK	8 September 1988 (age 37)	Samtredia	2021		8	0
Defenders
4	Artem Baranovskyi	(Ukraine)	DF	17 March 1990 (age 36)	Kyzylzhar	2021		23	0
5	Vladimir Pokatilov	(Kazakhstan)	DF	8 December 1992 (age 33)	Zhetysu	2018			
6	Sergey Shustikov	(Russia)	DF	5 March 1989 (age 37)	Torpedo Moscow	2021		31	0
13	Miram Sapanov	(Kazakhstan)	DF	12 March 1986 (age 40)	Zhetysu	2021			
14	Bauyrzhan Omarov	(Kazakhstan)	DF	3 August 1990 (age 36)	Kaisar	2018			
19	Vitaliy Pryndeta	(Ukraine)	DF	2 February 1993 (age 33)	Volyn Lutsk	2021		4	0
28	Soslan Takulov	(Russia)	DF	28 April 1995 (age 31)	Shakhter Karagandy	2021		20	0
29	Maksim Litvinov	(Kazakhstan)	DF	29 August 1998 (age 27)	Youth Team	2019			
Midfielders
7	Yevgeni Yatskiy	(Russia)	MF	26 March 1997 (age 29)	Akron Tolyatti	2021		15	0
10	Yerkin Tapalov	(Kazakhstan)	MF	3 September 1993 (age 32)	Shakhter Karagandy	2021			
15	Rysbek Konyrov	(Kazakhstan)	MF	22 July 2002 (age 24)	Academy	2021		2	0
17	Yevgeni Kozlov	(Russia)	MF	4 February 1995 (age 31)	Ventspils	2021		27	6
18	Ruslan Khairov	(Kazakhstan)	MF	18 January 1990 (age 36)	Altay	2018			
20	Adlet Bolatov	(Kazakhstan)	MF	18 August 1998 (age 27)	Youth Team	2018			
21	Nauryzbek Zhagorov	(Kazakhstan)	MF	1 March 1998 (age 28)	Ekibastuz	2021			
33	Luka Imnadze	(Georgia (country))	MF	26 August 1997 (age 28)	Sabail	2021		13	2
57	Mikhail Gashchenkov	(Russia)	MF	19 June 1992 (age 34)	Nizhny Novgorod	2021		13	3
77	Eldar Abdrakhmanov	(Kazakhstan)	MF	16 January 1987 (age 39)	Atyrau	2020			
96	Ivan Antipov	(Kazakhstan)	MF	14 January 1996 (age 30)	Atyrau	2020			
99	Daniil Kochnev	(Kazakhstan)	MF	3 January 1999 (age 27)	Youth Team	2017			
Forwards
11	Reginaldo	(Mozambique)	FW	14 June 1990 (age 36)	Shkupi	2021		4	0
22	Mykola Kovtalyuk	(Ukraine)	FW	26 April 1995 (age 31)	Dila Gori	2021		28	7
23	Oleksiy Chychykov	(Ukraine)	FW	30 September 1987 (age 38)	Dnipro-1	2021		25	1
Players away on loan
Players that left during the season
9	Dmitri Michurenkov	(Russia)	FW	19 May 1995 (age 31)	Nizhny Novgorod	2021		18	2
11	Vyacheslav Shvyrev	(Kazakhstan)	FW	7 January 2001 (age 25)	loan from Kairat	2021		9	1
16	Ilya Karavaev	(Kazakhstan)	GK	4 May 1995 (age 31)	Kairat	2019			
19	Pavel Nazarenko	(Belarus)	DF	20 January 1995 (age 31)	Vitebsk	2021		13	1
32	Ardak Saulet	(Kazakhstan)	MF	12 January 1997 (age 29)	loan from Aktobe	2021		7	0
33	Magomed Paragulgov	(Kazakhstan)	MF	26 March 1994 (age 32)	Ermis Aradippou	2021		4	0
71	Marat Burayev	(Russia)	MF	22 October 1995 (age 30)	Unattached	2021		4	0
88	Erzhan Ibragimov	(Kazakhstan)	FW	18 May 2000 (age 26)	Youth team	2019			

=== Out on loan ===
Note: Flags indicate national team as defined under FIFA eligibility rules; some limited exceptions apply. Players may hold more than one non-FIFA nationality.

No. / Pos. / Nation / Player	No. / Pos. / Nation / Player

== Transfers ==
=== In ===
Date	Position	Nationality	Name	From	Fee	Ref.
19 February 2021	DF	(Kazakhstan)	Miram Sapanov	Zhetysu	Undisclosed	
19 February 2021	MF	(Kazakhstan)	Yerkin Tapalov	Shakhter Karagandy	Undisclosed	
20 February 2021	DF	(Belarus)	Pavel Nazarenko	Vitebsk	Undisclosed	
20 February 2021	DF	(Russia)	Sergey Shustikov	Torpedo Moscow	Undisclosed	
20 February 2021	DF	(Russia)	Soslan Takulov	Shakhter Karagandy	Undisclosed	
20 February 2021	MF	(Russia)	Marat Burayev	Unattached	Free	
20 February 2021	MF	(Russia)	Yevgeni Yatskiy	Akron Tolyatti	Undisclosed	
20 February 2021	FW	(Ukraine)	Oleksiy Chychykov	Dnipro-1	Undisclosed	
21 February 2021	GK	(Ukraine)	Serhiy Litovchenko	Unattached	Free	
27 February 2021	MF	(Kazakhstan)	Nauryzbek Zhagorov	Ekibastuz	Undisclosed	
2 March 2021	MF	(Kazakhstan)	Magomed Paragulgov	Ermis Aradippou	Undisclosed	
2 March 2021	MF	(Russia)	Yevgeni Kozlov	Ventspils	Undisclosed	
2 March 2021	FW	(Russia)	Dmitri Michurenkov	Nizhny Novgorod	Undisclosed	
4 March 2021	DF	(Ukraine)	Artem Baranovskyi	Kyzylzhar	Undisclosed	
4 March 2021	FW	(Ukraine)	Mykola Kovtalyuk	Dila Gori	Undisclosed	
1 July 2021	GK	(Moldova)	Ștefan Sicaci	Samtredia	Undisclosed	
1 July 2021	MF	(Georgia (country))	Luka Imnadze	Sabail	Undisclosed	
1 July 2021	MF	(Russia)	Mikhail Gashchenkov	Nizhny Novgorod	Undisclosed	
23 August 2021	FW	(Mozambique)	Reginaldo	Shkupi	Undisclosed	
26 August 2021	DF	(Ukraine)	Vitaliy Pryndeta	Volyn Lutsk	Undisclosed	

=== Loans in ===
Date from	Position	Nationality	Name	From	Date to	Ref.
2 March 2021	FW	(Kazakhstan)	Vyacheslav Shvyrev	Kairat	30 June 2021	
9 April 2021	MF	(Kazakhstan)	Ardak Saulet	Aktobe	28 July 2021	

=== Out ===
Date	Position	Nationality	Name	To	Fee	Ref.
9 July 2021	DF	(Belarus)	Pavel Nazarenko	Shakhter Karagandy	Undisclosed	
12 July 2021	MF	(Russia)	Marat Burayev	Slutsk	Undisclosed	

=== Released ===
Date	Position	Nationality	Name	Joined	Date	Ref.
30 June 2021	MF	(Kazakhstan)	Magomed Paragulgov	Torpedo Kutaisi		
13 July 2021	GK	(Kazakhstan)	Ilya Karavaev			
13 July 2021	FW	(Russia)	Dmitri Michurenkov	SKA Rostov-on-Don		

== Friendlies ==
31 January 2021	Rukh Lviv (Ukraine)	4 – 1	(Kazakhstan) Akzhayik
19:30 (UTC+6)	Kondrakov 11', 43'; Kalyuzhnyi 39'; Lyakh 41'	Report	Vyatkin 57'

== Competitions ==
=== Overview ===
Competition	First match	Last match	Starting round	Final position	Record							
Competition	First match	Last match	Starting round	Final position	Pld	W	D	L	GF	GA	GD	Win %
Premier League	14 March 2021	30 October 2021	Matchday 1		26	9	5	12	25	31	−6	34.62
Kazakhstan Cup	11 July 2021	14 August 2021	Group Stages	Group Stages	6	3	1	2	7	5	+2	50.00
Total					32	12	6	14	32	36	−4	37.50

Last updated: 30 October 2021
Source: Competitions

=== Premier League ===
==== Results summary ====
Overall								Home						Away					
Pld	W	D	L	GF	GA	GD	Pts	W	D	L	GF	GA	GD	W	D	L	GF	GA	GD
26	9	5	12	25	31	−6	32	5	3	5	12	13	−1	4	2	7	13	18	−5

Last updated: 30 October 2021.
Source: See Results

==== Results by round ====
Round	1	2	3	4	5	6	7	8	9	10	11	12	13	14	15	16	17	18	19	20	21	22	23	24	25	26
Ground	A	H	A	H	A	A	H	A	H	A	H	A	H	A	H	A	H	H	A	H	A	H	A	H	A	H
Result	L	W	L	L	W	L	W	L	W	W	W	W	L	L	L	W	D	W	L	L	D	D	L	D	D	L
Position	12	6	8	10	8	9	9	8	8	5	3	3	4	4	7	4	4	4	5	6	6	6	7	6	7	9

Source: See Results
A = Away; H = Home; W = Win; D = Draw; L = Loss

==== Results ====
14 March 2021 1	Tobol	2 – 0	Akzhayik	Kostanay
17:00 (UTC+6)	Nurgaliev 30' (yellow card) 45'; Tagybergen 75'	Report	Takulov (yellow card) 7'; R.Khairov (yellow card) 74'; I.Antipov (yellow card) 84'	Stadium: Central Stadium; Attendance: 600; Referee: Sergey Gorokhovodatskiy

20 March 2021 2	Akzhayik	1 – 0	Atyrau	Oral
16:00 (UTC+6)	Tapalov 74'; M.Sapanov (yellow card) 88'	Report	Gian (yellow card) 22'; Alex (yellow card) 57'; A.Zhumakhanov (yellow card) 60'; Grzelczak (red card) 89'	Stadium: Petr Atoyan Stadium; Attendance: 0 Referee: Georgy Chekhovsky
Note: Match played behind closed doors due to the COVID-19 pandemic in Kazakhstan.

5 April 2021 3	Ordabasy	2 – 1	Akzhayik	Shymkent
17:00 (UTC+6)	S.Shamshi (yellow card) 76'; João Paulo 90+3' (pen.); Tungyshbayev 90+6'	Report	Fontanello 51' (o.g.); Shustikov (yellow card) 63'; Michurenkov (yellow card) 85'; B.Omarov (yellow card) 90+3'	Stadium: Kazhymukan Munaitpasov Stadium; Attendance: 0 Referee: Sergey Nozhenko
Note: Match played behind closed doors due to the COVID-19 pandemic in Kazakhstan.

9 April 2021 4	Akzhayik	0 – 1	Kyzylzhar	Oral
16:00 (UTC+6)	Yatskiy (yellow card) 44'; B.Omarov (yellow card) 87'	Report	Zorić (yellow card) 39'; E.Abdrakhmanov 48' (o.g.); Danilo (red card) 85'	Stadium: Petr Atoyan Stadium; Attendance: 0 Referee: Artem Kuchin
Note: Match played behind closed doors due to the COVID-19 pandemic in Kazakhstan.

14 April 2021 5	Shakhter Karagandy	1 – 2	Akzhayik	Nur-Sultan
16:00 (UTC+6)	A.Tattybaev 44'; Baah (yellow card) 81'; J-A.Payruz (yellow card) 82'	Report	Baah 38' (o.g.); Chychykov (yellow card) 45'; D.Atanaskoski 74' (o.g.); Shvyrev (yellow card) 81'	Stadium: Astana Arena; Attendance: 0 Referee: Alexander Zatula
Note: Match played at the Astana Arena in Nur-Sultan instead of Shakhter's regular Shakhter Stadium in Karaganda. Match played behind closed doors due to the COVID-19 pandemic in Kazakhstan.

18 April 2021 6	Taraz	1 – 0	Akzhayik	Taraz
15:00 (UTC+6)	Eugénio 48'	Report	M.Sapanov (yellow card) 6'	Stadium: Central Stadium; Attendance: 2,500; Referee: Alexander Gauser

24 April 2021 7	Akzhayik	1 – 0	Aktobe	Oral
16:00 (UTC+6)	I.Antipov 12'; E.Abdrakhmanov (yellow card) 65'	Report	R.Nurmugamet (yellow card) 21'; Zhalmukan (yellow card) 34'; Totadze (yellow card) 54'; Manucharyan (yellow card) 66'; Jeřábek (red card) 78'; A.Azhimov (yellow card) 85'	Stadium: Petr Atoyan Stadium; Attendance: 0 Referee: Aydin Rakhimbaev
Note: Match played behind closed doors due to the COVID-19 pandemic in Kazakhstan.

28 April 2021 8	Astana	1 – 0	Akzhayik	Nur-Sultan
17:00 (UTC+6)	Barseghyan 6' (yellow card) 40'	Report	E.Abdrakhmanov (yellow card) 42'; M.Sapanov (yellow card) 55'; I.Antipov (yellow card) 75'; Takulov (yellow card) 80'	Stadium: Astana Arena; Attendance: 0 Referee: Anton Kuchma
Note: Match played behind closed doors due to the COVID-19 pandemic in Kazakhstan.

3 May 2021 9	Akzhayik	3 – 2	Zhetysu	Oral
18:00 (UTC+6)	Kovtalyuk 23', 51', 86'; Tapalov (yellow card) 49'; Takulov (yellow card) 90+1'	Report	Turysbek (yellow card) 30'; Kislitsyn 42'; R.Jalilov (yellow card) 80'; A.Adakhadzhiev 73'; Zhaksylykov (yellow card) 90'	Stadium: Petr Atoyan Stadium; Attendance: 0 Referee: Alexander Zatula
Note: Match played behind closed doors due to the COVID-19 pandemic in Kazakhstan.

8 May 2021 10	Kaisar	0 – 1	Akzhayik	Kyzylorda
20:00 (UTC+6)	Rudoselsky (yellow card) 15'; Potapov (yellow card) 87'	Report	Yatskiy (yellow card) 42'; E.Abdrakhmanov (yellow card) 53'; Michurenkov 75' (yellow card) 90+5'	Stadium: Gani Muratbayev Stadium; Attendance: 0 Referee: Grigory Moskovchenko
Note: Match played behind closed doors due to the COVID-19 pandemic in Kazakhstan.

14 May 2021 11	Akzhayik	1 – 0	Kairat	Oral
16:00 (UTC+6)	Nazarenko 53'	Report	Dugalić (yellow card) 55'; Suyumbayev (yellow card) 70'	Stadium: Petr Atoyan Stadium; Attendance: 0 Referee: Sergey Nozhenko
Note: Match played behind closed doors due to the COVID-19 pandemic in Kazakhstan.

18 May 2021 12	Turan	0 – 2	Akzhayik	Turkistan
18:00 (UTC+6)	Janković (yellow card) 40'; Adams (yellow card) 68'; B.Beysenov (yellow card) 90+1'	Report	Takulov (yellow card) 60'; Kovtalyuk 72', 75' (pen.)	Stadium: Turkistan Arena; Attendance: 1,400; Referee: Rustam Omarov

24 May 2021 13	Akzhayik	0 – 3	Caspiy	Oral
20:00 (UTC+6)		Report	W.Sahli 36'; Karayev 67'; R.Sakhalbaev 90+4'	Stadium: Petr Atoyan Stadium; Attendance: 560; Referee: Grigory Moskovchenko

29 May 2021 14	Atyrau	2 – 0	Akzhayik	Atyrau
20:00 (UTC+6)	Guz (yellow card) 41'; A.Rodionov 45+1'; Bryan 58'; Alex (yellow card) 70'	Report	Tapalov (yellow card) 44'; Kovtalyuk (yellow card) 71'; I.Antipov (yellow card) 81'	Stadium: Munaishy Stadium; Attendance: 1,200; Referee: Sayat Karabaev

12 June 2021 15	Akzhayik	0 – 1	Ordabasy	Oral
20:00 (UTC+6)	Tapalov (yellow card) 32'; Chychykov (yellow card) 64'; Kovtalyuk (yellow card) 87'	Report	Diakate (yellow card) 42'; João Paulo (yellow card) 76' (goal) 90+2'	Stadium: Petr Atoyan Stadium; Attendance: 1,600; Referee: Sergey Gorokhovodatsky

18 June 2021 16	Kyzylzhar	0 – 1	Akzhayik	Petropavl
18:00 (UTC+6)	Murachyov (yellow card) 22'; A.Saparov (yellow card) 90+2'	Report	I.Antipov (yellow card) 9' (goal) 50'; Kovtalyuk (yellow card) 32'; Baranovskyi (yellow card) 34'; Tapalov (yellow card) 90'	Stadium: Karasai Stadium; Attendance: 700; Referee: Sergei Nozhenko

22 June 2021 17	Akzhayik	1 – 1	Shakhter Karagandy	Oral
20:00 (UTC+6)	Kovtalyuk 54'; Michurenkov (yellow card) 90+7'	Report	Gabyshev (yellow card) 47' (yellow-red card) 90+7'; D.Atanaskoski (yellow card) 58'; Nazarenko 62' (o.g.); Najaryan (yellow card) 81'; Y.Kybyray (yellow card) 88'	Stadium: Petr Atoyan Stadium; Attendance: 1,600; Referee: Igor Chesnokov

28 June 2021 18	Akzhayik	3 – 0	Taraz	Oral
19:00 (UTC+6)	Shustikov (yellow card) 7'; Michurenkov 29' (pen.) (yellow card) 40'; I.Antipov (yellow card) 45+1'; M.Sapanov 69'; Shvyrev 71'; E.Abdrakhmanov (yellow card) 77'	Report	D.Evstingeyev (yellow card) 17'; Shakhmetov (yellow card) 28'; A.Suley (yellow card) 90+2'	Stadium: Petr Atoyan Stadium; Attendance: 1,000; Referee: Sayat Karabaev

2 July 2021 19	Aktobe	2 – 1	Akzhayik	Aktobe
21:00 (UTC+6)	Samorodov 58', 66'; R.Nurmugamet (yellow card) 88'; Revyakin (yellow card) 90+4'	Report	Kozlov 40'	Stadium: Central Stadium; Attendance: 4,200; Referee: Grigory Moskovchenko

11 September 2021 20	Akzhayik	0 – 1	Astana	Oral
18:00 (UTC+6)	Shustikov (yellow card) 60'; Tapalov (yellow card) 90+3'	Report	Ciupercă 10'; Šimunović (yellow card) 36'; Kuat (yellow card) 49'	Stadium: Petr Atoyan Stadium; Attendance: 1,600; Referee: Grigory Moskovchenko

18 September 2021 21	Zhetysu	2 – 2	Akzhayik	Taldıqorğan
15:00 (UTC+6)	Zhaksylykov 57'; R.Jalilov 74'	Report	E.Abdrakhmanov (yellow card) 53'; I.Antipov (yellow card) 63'; Kozlov 64'; Tapalov 80'	Stadium: Zhetysu Stadium; Attendance: 300; Referee: Danil Gorda

27 September 2021 22	Akzhayik	1 – 1	Kaisar	Oral
17:00 (UTC+6)	E.Abdrakhmanov (yellow card) 42'; Kozlov 65'; Gashchenkov (yellow card) 77'	Report	B.Shadmanov (yellow card) 56'; Bitang (yellow card) 69'; Laukžemis 76'; O.Makhan (yellow card) 78'	Stadium: Petr Atoyan Stadium; Attendance: 500; Referee: Elvira Nurmustafina

3 October 2021 23	Kairat	3 – 1	Akzhayik	Almaty
18:00 (UTC+6)	João Paulo 17'; Kosović 30'; Shushenachev 62'	Report	Takulov (yellow card) 28'; L.Imnadze 89'	Stadium: Central Stadium; Attendance: 1,300; Referee: Saken Bayimbet

16 October 2021 24	Akzhayik	1 – 1	Turan	Oral
15:00 (UTC+6)	Tapalov (yellow card) 15'; Shustikov (yellow card) 23'; Gashchenkov 30'	Report	Chizh (yellow card) 56'; T.Amirov (yellow card) 64'; Deobald 72'; A.Mukhamed (yellow card) 80'	Stadium: Petr Atoyan Stadium; Attendance: 1,200; Referee: Artem Kuchin

24 October 2021 25	Caspiy	2 – 2	Akzhayik	Aktau
17:00 (UTC+6)	Zaleski 15', 30' (pen.); Milošević (yellow card) 34'; Darabayev (yellow card) 56'; Gavrić (yellow card) 63'; Stanojević (yellow card) 90'	Report	B.Omarov (yellow card) 31'; Chychykov 46'; Gashchenkov 69' (yellow card) 73'; L.Imnadze (yellow card) 71'	Stadium: Zhastar Stadium; Attendance: 0 Referee: Sayat Karabaev
Note: Match played behind closed doors due to the COVID-19 pandemic in Kazakhstan.

30 October 2021 26	Akzhayik	0 – 2	Tobol	Oral
16:00 (UTC+6)	B.Omarov (yellow card) 28'; Tapalov (yellow card) 62'	Report	Sergeyev 27'; Brígido (yellow card) 38'; Tagybergen 60'; Malyi (yellow card) 70'	Stadium: Petr Atoyan Stadium; Attendance: 2,000; Referee: Alexander Zatula

==== League table ====
Pos	Team	Pld	W	D	L	GF	GA	GD	Pts
7	Aktobe	26	9	6	11	35	40	−5	33
8	Caspiy	26	8	8	10	35	35	0	32
9	Akzhayik	26	9	5	12	25	31	−6	32
10	Taraz	26	7	8	11	27	34	−7	29
11	Atyrau	26	7	7	12	25	40	−15	28

Source: UEFA, Soccerway
Rules for classification: 1) Points; 2) Goal difference; 3) Matches won; 4) Goals scored; 5) Away goals scored; 6) Head-to-head points; 7) Head-to-head matches won; 8) Head-to-head goal difference; 9) Head-to-head goals scored; 10) Head-to-head away goals scored; 11) Draw.

=== Kazakhstan Cup ===
==== Group stage ====
Pos	Team	Pld	W	D	L	GF	GA	GD	Pts	Qualification
1	Kaisar (A)	6	3	2	1	6	2	+4	11	Advanced to Quarterfinals
2	Astana (A)	6	3	2	1	6	6	0	11	Advanced to Quarterfinals
3	Akzhayik	6	3	1	2	7	5	+2	10	
4	Aktobe	6	0	1	5	5	11	−6	1	

Updated to match(es) played on 15 August 2021. Source: PFLK
(A) Advance to a further round

11 July 2021 1	Aktobe	0 – 2	Akzhayik	Aktobe
19:00 (UTC+6)	Doumbia (yellow card) 58'; A.Saulet (yellow card) 59'; Žulpa (yellow card) 62'; A.Tanzharikov (yellow card) 68'; Sergeyev (penalty missed) 75'	Report	Kozlov (penalty missed) 40' 40', 77'; Sicaci (yellow card) 87'	Stadium: Central Stadium; Attendance: 2,200; Referee: Saken Bayimbet

17 July 2021 2	Akzhayik	0 – 0	Kaisar	Oral
20:00 (UTC+6)	Kovtalyuk (yellow card) 82'	Report	Bitang (yellow card) 65'; N'Diaye (yellow card) 82'	Stadium: Petr Atoyan Stadium; Attendance: 1,600; Referee: Alexander Gauser

25 July 2021 3	Astana	1 – 0	Akzhayik	Nur-Sultan
21:00 (UTC+6)	Aymbetov 42'; Cadete (yellow card) 52'; Tomašević (yellow card) 61'; S.Sagnayev (yellow card) 73'; Gurman (yellow card) 86' (yellow-red card) 90+4'	Report	I.Antipov (yellow card) 7'; Kovtalyuk (yellow card) 20'; E.Abdrakhmanov (yellow card) 75'	Stadium: Astana Arena; Attendance: 0 Referee: Aydin Rakhimbaev
Note: Match played behind closed doors due to the COVID-19 pandemic in Kazakhstan.

1 August 2021 4	Akzhayik	3 – 0	Astana	Oral
19:00 (UTC+6)	Gashchenkov 34'; L.Imnadze 52'; Kozlov 58'	Report		Stadium: Petr Atoyan Stadium; Attendance: 1,600; Referee: Alexander Gauser

7 August 2021 5	Akzhayik	2 – 1	Aktobe	Oral
19:00 (UTC+6)	Kovtalyuk 3' (yellow card) 43'; Gashchenkov (yellow card) 41'; I.Antipov 53' (yellow card) 79'	Report	Logvinenko (yellow card) 43'; Jeřábek (yellow card) 61'; Yerlanov 78'; A.Tanzharikov (yellow card) 80'	Stadium: Petr Atoyan Stadium; Attendance: 1,500; Referee: Nikita Utrobin

14 August 2021 6	Kaisar	3 – 0	Akzhayik	Kyzylorda
21:00 (UTC+6)	Kenesov 25'; E.Altynbekov 38'; I.Amirseitov (yellow card) 67'; Bitang 85' (pen.)	Report	Gashchenkov (yellow card) 50'; B.Omarov (yellow card) 65'; V.Pokatilov (yellow card) 84'	Stadium: Gani Muratbayev Stadium; Attendance: 1,400; Referee: Sergey Nozhenko

== Squad statistics ==
As of match played 30 October 2021

=== Appearances and goals ===
No.	Pos	Nat	Player	Total		Premier League		Kazakhstan Cup	
No.	Pos	Nat	Player	Apps	Goals	Apps	Goals	Apps	Goals
1	GK	(Ukraine) UKR	Serhiy Litovchenko	19	0	19	0	0	0
4	DF	(Ukraine) UKR	Artem Baranovskyi	23	0	14+4	0	4+1	0
5	DF	(Kazakhstan) KAZ	Vladimir Pokatilov	16	0	5+5	0	5+1	0
6	DF	(Russia) RUS	Sergey Shustikov	31	0	25	0	6	0
7	MF	(Russia) RUS	Yevgeni Yatskiy	15	0	14+1	0	0	0
10	MF	(Kazakhstan) KAZ	Yerkin Tapalov	31	2	24+1	2	6	0
11	FW	(Mozambique) MOZ	Reginaldo	4	0	1+3	0	0	0
13	DF	(Kazakhstan) KAZ	Miram Sapanov	32	1	26	1	4+2	0
14	DF	(Kazakhstan) KAZ	Bauyrzhan Omarov	27	0	16+5	0	3+3	0
15	MF	(Kazakhstan) KAZ	Rysbek Konyrov	2	0	0+1	0	0+1	0
16	GK	(Kazakhstan) KAZ	Ilya Karavaev	6	0	5+1	0	0	0
17	MF	(Russia) RUS	Yevgeni Kozlov	27	6	13+9	3	5	3
18	MF	(Kazakhstan) KAZ	Ruslan Khairov	22	0	3+15	0	0+4	0
19	DF	(Ukraine) UKR	Vitaliy Pryndeta	4	0	1+3	0	0	0
21	MF	(Kazakhstan) KAZ	Nauryzbek Zhagorov	6	0	1+3	0	0+2	0
22	FW	(Ukraine) UKR	Mykola Kovtalyuk	28	7	18+6	6	3+1	1
23	FW	(Ukraine) UKR	Oleksiy Chychykov	25	1	19+5	1	0+1	0
28	DF	(Russia) RUS	Soslan Takulov	20	0	11+5	0	0+4	0
33	MF	(Georgia (country)) GEO	Luka Imnadze	13	2	1+6	1	5+1	1
57	MF	(Russia) RUS	Mikhail Gashchenkov	13	3	6+1	2	6	1
77	MF	(Kazakhstan) KAZ	Eldar Abdrakhmanov	28	0	21+1	0	6	0
88	GK	(Moldova) MDA	Ștefan Sicaci	8	0	2	0	6	0
96	MF	(Kazakhstan) KAZ	Ivan Antipov	25	3	15+6	2	3+1	1
Players away from Akzhayik on loan:
Players who left Akzhayik during the season:
9	FW	(Russia) RUS	Dmitri Michurenkov	18	2	8+9	2	1	0
11	FW	(Kazakhstan) KAZ	Vyacheslav Shvyrev	9	1	3+6	1	0	0
19	DF	(Belarus) BLR	Pavel Nazarenko	13	1	12+1	1	0	0
32	MF	(Kazakhstan) KAZ	Ardak Saulet	7	0	0+4	0	3	0
33	MF	(Kazakhstan) KAZ	Magomed Paragulgov	4	0	1+3	0	0	0
71	MF	(Russia) RUS	Marat Burayev	4	0	1+3	0	0	0

=== Goal scorers ===
Place	Position	Nation	Number	Name	Premier League	Kazakhstan Cup	Total
1	FW	(Ukraine)	22	Mykola Kovtalyuk	6	1	7
2	MF	(Russia)	17	Yevgeni Kozlov	3	3	6
3	MF	(Kazakhstan)	96	Ivan Antipov	2	1	3
3	MF	(Russia)	57	Mikhail Gashchenkov	2	1	3
3				Own goal	3	0	3
6	FW	(Russia)	9	Dmitri Michurenkov	2	0	2
6	MF	(Kazakhstan)	10	Yerkin Tapalov	2	0	2
6	MF	(Georgia (country))	33	Luka Imnadze	1	1	2
9	DF	(Belarus)	19	Pavel Nazarenko	1	0	1
9	DF	(Kazakhstan)	13	Miram Sapanov	1	0	1
9	FW	(Kazakhstan)	11	Vyacheslav Shvyrev	1	0	1
9	FW	(Ukraine)	23	Oleksiy Chychykov	1	0	1
				TOTALS	25	7	32

=== Clean sheets ===
Place	Position	Nation	Number	Name	Premier League	Kazakhstan Cup	Total
1	GK	(Ukraine)	1	Serhiy Litovchenko	5	0	5
2	GK	(Kazakhstan)	16	Ilya Karavaev	3	0	3
2	GK	(Moldova)	88	Ștefan Sicaci	0	3	3
				TOTALS	7	3	10

Litovchenko & Karavaev both played in Akzhayik's 1-0 victory over Kaisar on 8 May 2021

=== Disciplinary record ===
Number	Nation	Position	Name	Premier League		Kazakhstan Cup		Total	
Number	Nation	Position	Name	Booked	Sent off (straight red)	Booked	Sent off (straight red)	Booked	Sent off (straight red)
4	(Ukraine)	DF	Artem Baranovskyi	1	0	0	0	1	0
5	(Kazakhstan)	DF	Vladimir Pokatilov	0	0	1	0	1	0
6	(Russia)	DF	Sergey Shustikov	4	0	0	0	4	0
7	(Russia)	MF	Yevgeni Yatskiy	2	0	0	0	2	0
10	(Kazakhstan)	MF	Yerkin Tapalov	7	0	0	0	7	0
13	(Kazakhstan)	DF	Miram Sapanov	3	0	0	0	3	0
14	(Kazakhstan)	DF	Bauyrzhan Omarov	4	0	1	0	5	0
18	(Kazakhstan)	MF	Ruslan Khairov	1	0	0	0	1	0
22	(Ukraine)	FW	Mykola Kovtalyuk	3	0	3	0	6	0
23	(Ukraine)	FW	Oleksiy Chychykov	2	0	0	0	2	0
28	(Russia)	DF	Soslan Takulov	5	0	0	0	5	0
33	(Georgia (country))	MF	Luka Imnadze	1	0	0	0	1	0
57	(Russia)	MF	Mikhail Gashchenkov	2	0	2	0	4	0
77	(Kazakhstan)	MF	Eldar Abdrakhmanov	6	0	1	0	7	0
88	(Moldova)	GK	Ștefan Sicaci	0	0	1	0	1	0
96	(Kazakhstan)	MF	Ivan Antipov	6	0	2	0	8	0
Players who left Akzhayik during the season:
9	(Russia)	FW	Dmitri Michurenkov	4	0	0	0	4	0
11	(Kazakhstan)	FW	Vyacheslav Shvyrev	1	0	0	0	1	0
32	(Kazakhstan)	MF	Ardak Saulet	0	0	1	0	1	0
			TOTALS	52	0	12	0	64	0
