= List of Kazakhstan football transfers winter 2020–21 =

This is a list of Kazakh football transfers in the winter transfer window 2020 by club. Only clubs of the 2021 Kazakhstan Premier League are included.

== Kazakhstan Premier League 2021 ==
=== Aktobe ===
In: Note: Flags indicate national team as defined under FIFA eligibility rules; some limited exceptions apply. Players may hold more than one non-FIFA nationality.

No.	Pos.	Nation	Player
2	DF	KAZ	Dinmukhamed Kashken (from (Kazakhstan) Astana)
3	DF	GEO	Lasha Totadze (from (Georgia (country)) Samtredia)
5	DF	ARM	Armen Manucharyan (from (Russia) Rotor Volgograd)
9	FW	SRB	Bojan Dubajić (from (Belarus) BATE Borisov)
11	FW	UZB	Igor Sergeev (from (Uzbekistan) Pakhtakor Tashkent)
14	MF	KAZ	Yuriy Pertsukh (from (Kazakhstan) Astana)
18	MF	CZE	Michal Jeřábek (from (Czech Republic) Jablonec)
20	MF	KAZ	Yerkebulan Nurgaliyev (from (Kazakhstan) Caspiy)
73	MF	KAZ	Didar Zhalmukan (from (Kazakhstan) Astana)
93	MF	MLI	Tongo Doumbia
94	MF	CMR	Hervaine Moukam (from (Belarus) BATE Borisov)
96	MF	KAZ	Maxim Fedin (from (Kazakhstan) Tobol)

Out: Note: Flags indicate national team as defined under FIFA eligibility rules; some limited exceptions apply. Players may hold more than one non-FIFA nationality.

No.	Pos.	Nation	Player
3	DF	RUS	Georgi Burnash
5	DF	RUS	Aleksei Kontsedalov
7	MF	RUS	Oleg Chernyshov (loan return to (Russia) Tambov)
9	FW	KAZ	Vladislav Prokopenko (loan return to (Kazakhstan) Astana)
10	MF	KAZ	Zhambyl Kukeyev
18	FW	RUS	Eduard Sukhanov (to (Russia) Leningradets)
24	MF	SRB	Nikola Cuckić (to (Kazakhstan) Caspiy)
25	GK	KAZ	Evgeniy Sitdikov
28	MF	KAZ	Rustam Sakhibov
32	GK	KAZ	Mukhambet Tamabay
40	DF	CIV	Kouassi Kouadja
48	DF	KAZ	Alisher Nazarov
77	FW	RUS	Andrei Chasovskikh (loan return to (Russia) Tambov)
97	FW	MNE	Boban Đorđević (to (Montenegro) Mornar)

=== Akzhayik ===
In: Note: Flags indicate national team as defined under FIFA eligibility rules; some limited exceptions apply. Players may hold more than one non-FIFA nationality.

No.	Pos.	Nation	Player
—	GK	UKR	Serhiy Litovchenko
—	DF	BLR	Pavel Nazarenko (from (Belarus) Vitebsk)
—	DF	KAZ	Miram Sapanov (from (Kazakhstan) Zhetysu)
—	DF	RUS	Sergey Shustikov (from (Russia) Torpedo Moscow)
—	DF	RUS	Soslan Takulov (from (Kazakhstan) Shakhter Karagandy)
—	DF	UKR	Artem Baranovskyi (from (Kazakhstan) Kyzylzhar)
—	MF	KAZ	Magomed Paragulgov (from (Cyprus) Ermis Aradippou)
—	MF	KAZ	Erkin Tapalov (from (Kazakhstan) Shakhter Karagandy)
—	MF	KAZ	Nauryzbek Zhagorov (from (Kazakhstan) Ekibastuz)
—	MF	RUS	Marat Burayev
—	MF	RUS	Yevgeni Kozlov (from (Latvia) Ventspils)
—	MF	RUS	Yevgeni Yatskiy (from (Russia) Akron Tolyatti)
—	FW	KAZ	Vyacheslav Shvyrev (from (Kazakhstan) Kairat)
—	FW	RUS	Dmitri Michurenkov (from (Russia) Nizhny Novgorod)
—	FW	UKR	Oleksiy Chychykov (from (Ukraine) Dnipro-1)
—	FW	UKR	Mykola Kovtalyuk (from (Georgia (country)) Dila Gori)

Out: Note: Flags indicate national team as defined under FIFA eligibility rules; some limited exceptions apply. Players may hold more than one non-FIFA nationality.

No.	Pos.	Nation	Player
1	GK	KAZ	Aleksandr Udalov
3	DF	RUS	Anton Kushniruk (to (Russia) Dynamo Stavropol)
4	DF	KAZ	Yevgeny Rafikov
8	FW	KAZ	Aleksei Maltsev (Retired)
9	FW	KAZ	Robert Kazekenov
10	MF	KAZ	Vladimir Vyatkin
11	DF	KAZ	Yerbolat Rustemov (to (Kazakhstan) Makhtaaral)
15	MF	RUS	Aleksandr Manukovsky
19	MF	KAZ	Maksim Gladchenko (to (Kazakhstan) Caspiy)
21	MF	KAZ	Rysbek Konyrov
22	DF	KAZ	Anuar Umashev
23	FW	KAZ	Nikolay Zabrodin
24	FW	RUS	Ivan Stolbovoy (to (Russia) Znamya Noginsk)
26	MF	KAZ	Yerasyl Seitkanov
27	FW	KAZ	Yernar Kusakov
33	MF	KAZ	Altynbek Murzabekov
37	FW	MDA	Oleg Hromțov
46	FW	KAZ	Danil Almazuly
77	MF	KAZ	Samat Berdauletov
90	GK	KAZ	Vladislav Saenko

=== Astana ===
In: Note: Flags indicate national team as defined under FIFA eligibility rules; some limited exceptions apply. Players may hold more than one non-FIFA nationality.

No.	Pos.	Nation	Player
3	DF	ARM	Varazdat Haroyan (from (Russia) Tambov)
5	DF	KAZ	Mark Gorman (from (Kazakhstan) Kaisar)
8	MF	KAZ	Islambek Kuat (from (Russia) Khimki)
18	DF	KAZ	Sagi Sovet (loan return from (Kazakhstan) Arys)
19	MF	KAZ	Lev Skvortsov (loan return from (Kazakhstan) Atyrau)
45	FW	KAZ	Roman Murtazayev (from (Kazakhstan) Tobol)
55	GK	KAZ	Aleksandr Zarutskiy (from (Kazakhstan) Kaisar)
80	FW	KAZ	Vladislav Prokopenko (loan return from (Kazakhstan) Aktobe)
87	MF	KAZ	Zhaslan Kairkenov (loan return from (Kazakhstan) Atyrau)
92	MF	MDA	Valeriu Ciupercă (from (Russia) Tambov)
99	FW	BIH	Semir Smajlagić (from (Slovenia) ND Gorica)

Out: Note: Flags indicate national team as defined under FIFA eligibility rules; some limited exceptions apply. Players may hold more than one non-FIFA nationality.

No.	Pos.	Nation	Player
1	GK	KAZ	Nenad Erić (Retired)
4	DF	SRB	Uroš Radaković (loan return to (Czech Republic) Sparta Prague)
10	MF	ISL	Rúnar Már Sigurjónsson (to (Romania) CFR Cluj)
18	MF	BLR	Ivan Mayewski (to (Russia) Rotor Volgograd)
20	FW	CYP	Pieros Sotiriou (to (Bulgaria) Ludogorets Razgrad)
27	DF	KAZ	Yuriy Logvinenko (to (Russia) Rotor Volgograd)
28	MF	KAZ	Yuriy Pertsukh (to (Kazakhstan) Aktobe)
44	DF	KAZ	Yevgeny Postnikov
53	GK	KAZ	Stanislav Pavlov (to (Kazakhstan) Turan)
73	MF	KAZ	Didar Zhalmukan (to (Kazakhstan) Aktobe)
76	DF	KAZ	Dinmukhamed Kashken (to (Kazakhstan) Aktobe, previously on loan to (Kazakhstan) Kaisar)
77	DF	KAZ	Dmitri Shomko (to (Russia) Rotor Volgograd)
81	FW	KAZ	Ramazan Karimov (on loan to (Kazakhstan) Caspiy)
87	MF	KAZ	Zhaslan Kairkenov (on loan to (Kazakhstan) Atyrau)
99	FW	KAZ	Aleksey Shchotkin (to (Russia) Rotor Volgograd)
—	GK	KAZ	Vladislav Sayenko (to (Kazakhstan) Kyzylzhar, previously on loan to (Kazakhstan) Akzhayik)
—	DF	KAZ	Talgat Kusyapov (on loan to (Kazakhstan) Caspiy, previously on loan to (Kazakhstan) Okzhetpes)

=== Atyrau ===
In: Note: Flags indicate national team as defined under FIFA eligibility rules; some limited exceptions apply. Players may hold more than one non-FIFA nationality.

No.	Pos.	Nation	Player
2	DF	KAZ	Dauren Mazhitov
15	DF	BRA	Bryan (from (Armenia) Alashkert)
18	DF	KAZ	Kuanysh Kalmuratov (loan return from (Kazakhstan) Kaisar)
22	DF	HAI	Alex Christian (from Ararat-Armenia)
27	DF	KAZ	Viktor Dmitrenko (from (Kazakhstan) Tobol)
28	DF	SRB	Danijel Stojković (from (Belarus) Neman Grodno)
33	DF	RUS	Dmitry Guz (from (Armenia) Urartu)
77	GK	ARM	Aram Ayrapetyan (from (Iran) Paykan)
82	MF	KAZ	Zhaslan Kairkenov (on loan from (Kazakhstan) Astana)
88	MF	BRA	Gian (from (Kazakhstan) Okzhetpes)
90	MF	KOS	Donjet Shkodra (from (Kazakhstan) Zhetysu)
99	FW	BIH	Petar Kunić (from (Bosnia and Herzegovina) Zrinjski Mostar)

Out: Note: Flags indicate national team as defined under FIFA eligibility rules; some limited exceptions apply. Players may hold more than one non-FIFA nationality.

No.	Pos.	Nation	Player
2	DF	BLR	Dzyanis Obrazaw (to (Belarus) Slutsk)
8	DF	KAZ	Valentin Chureev
11	MF	KAZ	Maksat Bayzhanov (to (Kazakhstan) Kaisar)
22	DF	KAZ	Meirzhan Kambil
33	DF	KAZ	Abylkhayr Zulfikarov
51	GK	KAZ	Vladimir Groshev
82	MF	KAZ	Zhaslan Kairkenov (loan return to (Kazakhstan) Astana)
87	DF	UKR	Serhiy Basov (to (Ukraine) Metalurh Zaporizhya)
91	MF	KAZ	Lev Skvortsov (loan return to (Kazakhstan) Astana)
97	FW	KAZ	Temirlan Amirov

=== Caspiy ===
In: Note: Flags indicate national team as defined under FIFA eligibility rules; some limited exceptions apply. Players may hold more than one non-FIFA nationality.

No.	Pos.	Nation	Player
6	DF	BLR	Aleksey Zaleski (from (Belarus) Minsk)
9	MF	TKM	Ruslan Mingazow (from (Kazakhstan) Shakhter Karagandy)
11	MF	KAZ	Aslan Darabayev (from (Kazakhstan) Zhetysu)
14	DF	UKR	Taras Bondarenko (from (Kazakhstan) Okzhetpes)
15	FW	RUS	David Karayev (from (Russia) Ural Yekaterinburg)
21	MF	KAZ	Maksim Gladchenko (from (Kazakhstan) Akzhayik)
22	DF	KAZ	Talgat Kusyapov (on loan from (Kazakhstan) Astana)
24	MF	SRB	Nikola Cuckić (from (Kazakhstan) Aktobe)
48	MF	FRA	Chafik Tigroudja (from (France) USP Grand Avignon)
77	MF	TUN	Wajdi Sahli
81	FW	KAZ	Ramazan Karimov (on loan from (Kazakhstan) Astana)
98	DF	KAZ	Niyaz Shugaev (on loan from (Kazakhstan) Shakhter Karagandy)

Out: Note: Flags indicate national team as defined under FIFA eligibility rules; some limited exceptions apply. Players may hold more than one non-FIFA nationality.

No.	Pos.	Nation	Player
3	DF	KAZ	Rafkat Aslan (to (Kazakhstan) Zhetysu)
4	DF	KAZ	Erlan Kadyrbaev
5	DF	KAZ	Mikhail Gabyshev (to (Kazakhstan) Shakhter Karagandy)
6	DF	KAZ	Rakhimzhan Rozybakiev
11	MF	KAZ	Yerkebulan Nurgaliyev (to (Kazakhstan) Aktobe)
14	MF	UKR	Maksym Marusych (to (Latvia) Noah Jūrmala)
18	MF	KAZ	Kirill Shestakov
22	MF	KAZ	Marat Shakhmetov (loan return to (Kazakhstan) Shakhter Karagandy)
30	MF	FRA	Billal Sebaihi (to (Romania) Hermannstadt)
37	MF	RUS	Vladislav Sirotov
51	GK	RUS	Denis Kavlinov (to (Kazakhstan) Zhetysu)
55	DF	RUS	Layonel Adams (to (Kazakhstan) Turan)
97	FW	CRO	Branko Čubrilo (to (Croatia) Kaštel Gomilica)

=== Kairat ===
In: Note: Flags indicate national team as defined under FIFA eligibility rules; some limited exceptions apply. Players may hold more than one non-FIFA nationality.

No.	Pos.	Nation	Player
10	FW	GER	Streli Mamba (from (Germany) SC Paderborn)
—	FW	GUI	José Kanté (from (Poland) Legia Warsaw)
—	FW	KAZ	Yerkebulan Seydakhmet (loan return from (Kazakhstan) Zhetysu)

Out: Note: Flags indicate national team as defined under FIFA eligibility rules; some limited exceptions apply. Players may hold more than one non-FIFA nationality.

No.	Pos.	Nation	Player
7	FW	KAZ	Abat Aimbetov (to (Russia) Krylia Sovetov)
14	MF	KAZ	Adam Adakhadzhiev (on loan to (Kazakhstan) Zhetysu)
15	DF	KAZ	Nurlan Dairov
18	MF	POL	Konrad Wrzesiński (to (Poland) Jagiellonia Białystok)
21	FW	KAZ	Yerkebulan Tungyshbayev (to (Kazakhstan) Ordabasy)
23	FW	KAZ	Vyacheslav Shvyrev (to (Kazakhstan) Akzhayik)
—	DF	KAZ	Alibek Kasym (to (Kazakhstan) Kyzylzhar, previously on loan)

=== Kaisar ===
In: Note: Flags indicate national team as defined under FIFA eligibility rules; some limited exceptions apply. Players may hold more than one non-FIFA nationality.

No.	Pos.	Nation	Player
5	DF	RUS	Yegor Potapov (from (Belarus) Slavia Mozyr)
6	DF	KAZ	Bekzat Shadmanov (from (Kazakhstan) Taraz)
7	FW	ARM	Gegham Kadymyan (from (Belarus) Neman Grodno)
11	MF	KAZ	Maksat Bayzhanov (from (Kazakhstan) Atyrau)
16	DF	SEN	Ousmane N'Diaye (from (Moldova) Sheriff Tiraspol)
20	MF	MNE	Jovan Čađenović (from (Kazakhstan) Taraz)
21	GK	RUS	Artyom Leonov (from (Belarus) Minsk)
23	DF	KAZ	Timur Rudoselskiy (from (Armenia) Lori)
24	DF	BLR	Sergey Karpovich (from (Belarus) Isloch Minsk Raion)
27	FW	MNE	Stefan Denković (from (Serbia) Spartak Subotica)
80	MF	KAZ	Arman Kenesov (on loan from (Russia) SKA-Khabarovsk)
92	FW	LTU	Karolis Laukžemis (from (Malta) Hibernians)
94	DF	KAZ	Ular Zhaksybaev (to (Kazakhstan) Ordabasy)

Out: Note: Flags indicate national team as defined under FIFA eligibility rules; some limited exceptions apply. Players may hold more than one non-FIFA nationality.

No.	Pos.	Nation	Player
1	GK	KAZ	Aleksandr Zarutskiy (to (Kazakhstan) Astana)
2	DF	KAZ	Yeldos Akhmetov (to (Kazakhstan) Taraz)
5	DF	KAZ	Bagdat Kairov (to (Kazakhstan) Ordabasy)
7	FW	BUL	Aleksandar Kolev (to (Poland) Stal Mielec)
8	MF	KAZ	Askhat Tagybergen (to (Kazakhstan) Tobol)
9	FW	GEO	Elguja Lobjanidze (to (Kazakhstan) Tobol)
14	DF	KAZ	Mark Gorman (to (Kazakhstan) Astana)
22	DF	KAZ	Aleksandr Marochkin (loan return to (Kazakhstan) Tobol)
23	DF	KAZ	Olzhas Altaev
39	MF	SRB	Aleksandar Stanisavljević (to (Serbia) Voždovac)
55	DF	CRO	Ivan Graf (to (Kazakhstan) Shakhter Karagandy)
61	DF	KAZ	Dinmukhamed Kashken (loan return to (Kazakhstan) Astana)
77	DF	KAZ	Kuanysh Kalmuratov (loan return to (Kazakhstan) Atyrau)
94	MF	CPV	Alvin Fortes (to (Uzbekistan) AGMK)
96	MF	KAZ	Maxim Fedin (loan return to (Kazakhstan) Tobol)
99	FW	MOZ	Reginaldo Faife (to (North Macedonia) Shkupi)

=== Kyzylzhar ===
In: Note: Flags indicate national team as defined under FIFA eligibility rules; some limited exceptions apply. Players may hold more than one non-FIFA nationality.

No.	Pos.	Nation	Player
1	GK	KAZ	Almat Bekbaev (from (Kazakhstan) Zhetysu)
3	DF	RUS	Oleg Murachyov (from (Belarus) Neman Grodno)
5	DF	BLR	Valery Karshakevich (from (Kazakhstan) Taraz)
6	DF	KAZ	Alibek Kasym (from (Kazakhstan) Kairat, previously on loan)
8	MF	UKR	Yuriy Bushman (from (Lithuania) Kauno Žalgiris)
9	FW	BRA	Danilo Almeida (from (South Korea) Suwon)
14	FW	GEO	Roman Chanturia (from (Georgia (country)) Dila Gori)
15	DF	KAZ	Dmitry Shmidt (from (Kazakhstan) Okzhetpes)
23	MF	KAZ	Altynbek Saparov (from (Kazakhstan) Okzhetpes)
25	DF	KAZ	Ruslan Esimov (from (Kazakhstan) Ekibastuz)
27	FW	KGZ	Ernist Batyrkanov (from (Kyrgyzstan) Dordoi Bishkek)
28	MF	MNE	Darko Zorić (from (Kazakhstan) Okzhetpes)
90	GK	KAZ	Vladislav Sayenko (from (Kazakhstan) Astana)

Out: Note: Flags indicate national team as defined under FIFA eligibility rules; some limited exceptions apply. Players may hold more than one non-FIFA nationality.

No.	Pos.	Nation	Player
1	GK	KAZ	Anton Tsirin
3	DF	UKR	Artem Baranovskyi (to (Kazakhstan) Akzhayik)
8	FW	GAM	Momodou Ceesay
9	FW	RUS	Ivan Markelov
14	FW	ARM	Ruslan Koryan
15	DF	KAZ	Aleksandr Sokolenko
16	MF	MDA	Mihai Plătică (to (Moldova) Petrocub Hîncești)
21	MF	MNE	Uroš Delić
23	DF	KAZ	Berik Shaikhov (to (Kazakhstan) Taraz)
27	DF	LTU	Vytautas Andriuškevičius
33	GK	KAZ	Oleg Grubov
44	MF	KAZ	Nurlan Daurenbekov
66	DF	RUS	Igor Gubanov
77	FW	KAZ	Sergei Skorykh
78	FW	BLR	Ihar Zyankovich

=== Ordabasy ===
In: Note: Flags indicate national team as defined under FIFA eligibility rules; some limited exceptions apply. Players may hold more than one non-FIFA nationality.

No.	Pos.	Nation	Player
8	DF	KAZ	Temirlan Yerlanov (from (Kazakhstan) Tobol)
13	DF	KAZ	Sagadat Tursynbay (loan return from (Kazakhstan) Tobol)
17	DF	KAZ	Bagdat Kairov (from (Kazakhstan) Kaisar)
21	FW	KAZ	Yerkebulan Tungyshbayev (from (Kazakhstan) Kairat)
23	MF	NGA	Chidi Osuchukwu (from (Russia) Tom Tomsk)

Out: Note: Flags indicate national team as defined under FIFA eligibility rules; some limited exceptions apply. Players may hold more than one non-FIFA nationality.

No.	Pos.	Nation	Player
4	DF	KAZ	Viktor Dmitrenko (to (Kazakhstan) Atyrau)
6	DF	KAZ	Ular Zhaksybaev (to (Kazakhstan) Kaisar)
17	DF	KAZ	Mardan Tolebek (to (Kazakhstan) Turan)
18	MF	KAZ	Maksim Vaganov
39	FW	BEL	Ziguy Badibanga (to (Kazakhstan) Shakhter Karagandy)
72	DF	KAZ	Andrey Shabaev (to (Kazakhstan) Zhetysu)
77	DF	KAZ	Talgat Adyrbekov

=== Shakhter Karagandy ===
In: Note: Flags indicate national team as defined under FIFA eligibility rules; some limited exceptions apply. Players may hold more than one non-FIFA nationality.

No.	Pos.	Nation	Player
3	DF	MKD	David Atanaskoski
5	DF	KAZ	Mikhail Gabyshev (from (Kazakhstan) Caspiy)
10	FW	UKR	Vitaliy Balashov
16	DF	KAZ	Yeskendir Kybyray (from (Kazakhstan) Zhetysu)
18	MF	ARM	Solomon Udo (from (Armenia) Ararat Yerevan)
29	MF	SRB	Vuk Mitošević (from (Serbia) Radnik Surdulica)
30	GK	KAZ	Igor Shatskiy (from (Kazakhstan) Tobol)
44	DF	KAZ	Karam Sultanov (from (Azerbaijan) Sumgayit)
55	DF	CRO	Ivan Graf (from (Kazakhstan) Kaisar)
91	FW	UKR	Yevhen Pavlov (from (Serbia) Radnik Surdulica)
99	FW	NGA	Joseph Adah (from (Armenia) Gandzasar Kapan)
—	FW	BEL	Ziguy Badibanga (from (Kazakhstan) Ordabasy)

Out: Note: Flags indicate national team as defined under FIFA eligibility rules; some limited exceptions apply. Players may hold more than one non-FIFA nationality.

No.	Pos.	Nation	Player
1	GK	ARM	David Yurchenko (to (Armenia) Alashkert)
2	DF	RUS	Dmitri Yatchenko (to (Russia) Akron Tolyatti)
3	DF	UKR	Yevhen Tkachuk (to (Ukraine) Metalist 1925 Kharkiv)
5	DF	RUS	Soslan Takulov (to (Kazakhstan) Akzhayik)
8	MF	NGA	Muhammed Usman (to (Israel) Hapoel Hadera)
11	FW	EST	Sergei Zenjov (to (Estonia) Flora)
12	FW	CIV	Cédric Kouadio (to (Belarus) Neman Grodno)
17	MF	KAZ	Aslanbek Kakimov
20	MF	TKM	Ruslan Mingazow (to (Kazakhstan) Caspiy)
22	MF	KAZ	Marat Shakhmetov (to (Kazakhstan) Taraz, previously on loan to (Kazakhstan) Caspiy)
26	MF	KAZ	Erkin Tapalov (to (Kazakhstan) Akzhayik)
33	DF	CMR	Abdel Lamanje (to (Romania) Astra Giurgiu)
40	GK	KAZ	Yegor Tsuprikov (to (Kazakhstan) Tobol)
—	DF	KAZ	Niyaz Shugaev (to (Kazakhstan) Caspiy)

=== Taraz ===
In: Note: Flags indicate national team as defined under FIFA eligibility rules; some limited exceptions apply. Players may hold more than one non-FIFA nationality.

No.	Pos.	Nation	Player
2	DF	KAZ	Yeldos Akhmetov (from (Kazakhstan) Kaisar)
5	DF	KAZ	Adilet Kenesbek (from (Kazakhstan) Altai Semey)
6	DF	KAZ	Berik Shaikhov (from (Kazakhstan) Kyzylzhar)
8	MF	KAZ	Zhakyp Kozhamberdy (from (Kazakhstan) Kyran)
22	MF	KAZ	Marat Shakhmetov (from (Kazakhstan) Shakhter Karagandy)
33	MF	POR	Pedro Eugénio (from (Kazakhstan) Zhetysu)
38	MF	SRB	Nenad Adamović (from (Kazakhstan) Zhetysu)
63	MF	CIV	Kódjo
72	DF	NGA	Faith Obilor (from (Moldova) Sheriff Tiraspol)
77	MF	KAZ	Kurmet Karaman (from (Kazakhstan) Igilik Qaratay)

Out: Note: Flags indicate national team as defined under FIFA eligibility rules; some limited exceptions apply. Players may hold more than one non-FIFA nationality.

No.	Pos.	Nation	Player
4	DF	KAZ	Bekzat Shadmanov (to (Kazakhstan) Kaisar)
5	DF	BLR	Valery Karshakevich (to (Kazakhstan) Kyzylzhar)
6	MF	KAZ	Adilet Abdenaby
8	MF	KAZ	Sheykhislam Kulakhmetov
9	MF	LTU	Ovidijus Verbickas (to (Lithuania) Žalgiris)
11	MF	KAZ	Gavril Kan
13	FW	SRB	Bratislav Punoševac
15	FW	GNB	Toni Silva (to (Kazakhstan) Tobol)
21	MF	MNE	Jovan Čađenović (to (Kazakhstan) Kaisar)
22	DF	KAZ	Madiyar Nuraly
23	DF	MNE	Dejan Boljević (to (Armenia) Alashkert)
25	DF	RUS	Mikhail Mishchenko
28	FW	KAZ	Bauyrzhan Turysbek (to (Kazakhstan) Zhetysu)
33	FW	TOG	Serge Nyuiadzi (to (Lithuania) Sūduva)
40	MF	SRB	Goran Brkić (to (Bosnia and Herzegovina) Tuzla City)
95	MF	RUS	Ayub Batsuyev (to (Latvia) Noah Jūrmala)

=== Tobol ===
In: Note: Flags indicate national team as defined under FIFA eligibility rules; some limited exceptions apply. Players may hold more than one non-FIFA nationality.

No.	Pos.	Nation	Player
8	MF	KAZ	Askhat Tagybergen (from (Kazakhstan) Kaisar)
15	FW	GNB	Toni Silva (loan return from (Kazakhstan) Taraz)
22	DF	KAZ	Aleksandr Marochkin (loan return from (Kazakhstan) Kaisar)
29	MF	SRB	Dušan Jovančić (on loan from (Turkey) Çaykur Rizespor)
41	GK	KAZ	Yegor Tsuprikov (from (Kazakhstan) Shakhter Karagandy)
99	FW	GEO	Elguja Lobjanidze (from (Kazakhstan) Kaisar)
—	FW	SRB	Nemanja Nikolić (from (Saudi Arabia) Al Raed)

Out: Note: Flags indicate national team as defined under FIFA eligibility rules; some limited exceptions apply. Players may hold more than one non-FIFA nationality.

No.	Pos.	Nation	Player
4	DF	ARM	Arman Hovhannisyan (to (Armenia) Pyunik)
8	DF	KAZ	Temirlan Yerlanov (to (Kazakhstan) Ordabasy)
10	MF	GEO	Nika Kvekveskiri (to (Poland) Lech Poznań)
19	FW	CIV	Senin Sebai (to (Russia) Khimki)
20	MF	GEO	Jaba Kankava (to (France) Valenciennes)
26	DF	KAZ	Sagadat Tursynbay (loan return to (Kazakhstan) Ordabasy)
30	GK	KAZ	Igor Shatskiy (to (Kazakhstan) Shakhter Karagandy)
45	FW	KAZ	Roman Murtazayev (to (Kazakhstan) Astana)
77	MF	ARM	Petros Avetisyan (to (Armenia) Noah)
96	MF	KAZ	Maxim Fedin (to (Kazakhstan) Aktobe, previously on loan to (Kazakhstan) Kaisar)

=== Turan ===
In: Note: Flags indicate national team as defined under FIFA eligibility rules; some limited exceptions apply. Players may hold more than one non-FIFA nationality.

No.	Pos.	Nation	Player
1	GK	KAZ	Stanislav Pavlov (from (Kazakhstan) Astana)
2	DF	RUS	Layonel Adams (from (Kazakhstan) Caspiy)
4	MF	UKR	Yevhen Smirnov (from (Moldova) Sfântul Gheorghe)
17	DF	KAZ	Mardan Tolebek (to (Kazakhstan) Ordabasy)
22	DF	SRB	Stefan Živković (from (Kazakhstan) Zhetysu)
24	MF	SRB	Milan Stojanović (from (Kazakhstan) Okzhetpes)
26	DF	KAZ	Olzhas Kerimzhanov (from (Kazakhstan) Zhetysu)
31	DF	BLR	Andrey Zaleski (from (Kazakhstan) Zhetysu)
57	MF	RUS	Pavel Deobald (from (Armenia) Noah)
69	MF	RUS	Nikita Bocharov

Out: Note: Flags indicate national team as defined under FIFA eligibility rules; some limited exceptions apply. Players may hold more than one non-FIFA nationality.

No.	Pos.	Nation	Player
—	DF	KAZ	Sagi Sovet (loan return to (Kazakhstan) Astana)

=== Zhetysu ===
In: Note: Flags indicate national team as defined under FIFA eligibility rules; some limited exceptions apply. Players may hold more than one non-FIFA nationality.

No.	Pos.	Nation	Player
5	DF	KAZ	Aleksandr Kislitsyn
6	MF	KAZ	Adam Adakhadzhiev (on loan from (Kazakhstan) Kairat)
8	MF	EST	Artjom Dmitrijev (from (Kazakhstan) Okzhetpes)
12	DF	NGA	Philip Ipole (from (Russia) Sochi)
14	DF	KAZ	Rafkat Aslan (from (Kazakhstan) Caspiy)
20	DF	NGA	Aliyu Abubakar (from (Kazakhstan) Okzhetpes)
21	GK	KAZ	Mikhail Golubnichy (from (Kazakhstan) Aksu)
22	MF	KAZ	Aslan Dzhanuzakov (from (Kazakhstan) SDYuSShOR-8 Nursultan)
25	MF	RUS	Denis Poyarkov (from (Russia) Tom Tomsk)
27	DF	KAZ	Andrey Shabaev (from (Kazakhstan) Ordabasy)
59	DF	BLR	Illya Kalpachuk (from (Belarus) Rukh Brest)
70	GK	RUS	Denis Kavlinov (from (Kazakhstan) Caspiy)
77	MF	KAZ	Akmal Bakhtiyarov (on loan from (Russia) Sochi)
99	FW	KAZ	Bauyrzhan Turysbek (from (Kazakhstan) Taraz)

Out: Note: Flags indicate national team as defined under FIFA eligibility rules; some limited exceptions apply. Players may hold more than one non-FIFA nationality.

No.	Pos.	Nation	Player
3	DF	BLR	Andrey Lebedzew (to (Belarus) Vitebsk)
7	FW	KAZ	Yerkebulan Seydakhmet (loan return to (Kazakhstan) Kairat)
8	MF	KAZ	Aslan Darabayev (to (Kazakhstan) Caspiy)
10	MF	KOS	Donjet Shkodra (to (Kazakhstan) Atyrau)
11	FW	BLR	Vadim Pobudey (to (Belarus) Gomel)
13	DF	KAZ	Yermek Kuantayev
14	MF	GHA	David Mawutor (to (Poland) Wisła Kraków)
17	FW	BLR	Yahor Zubovich (to (Belarus) Neman Grodno)
21	MF	SRB	Nenad Adamović (to (Kazakhstan) Taraz)
22	DF	SRB	Stefan Živković (to (Kazakhstan) Turan)
23	DF	BLR	Nikita Naumov (to (Belarus) Dinamo Minsk)
26	DF	KAZ	Olzhas Kerimzhanov (to (Kazakhstan) Turan)
30	DF	KAZ	Miram Sapanov (to (Kazakhstan) Akzhayik)
31	DF	BLR	Andrey Zaleski (to (Kazakhstan) Turan)
33	MF	POR	Pedro Eugénio (to (Kazakhstan) Taraz)
36	GK	KAZ	Vleri Kaznacheev
44	MF	LTU	Artūras Žulpa (to (Italy) Siena)
46	DF	KAZ	Yeskendir Kybyray (to (Kazakhstan) Shakhter Karagandy)
70	GK	KAZ	Almat Bekbaev (to (Kazakhstan) Kyzylzhar)
77	MF	KAZ	Almir Mukhutdinov
78	MF	KAZ	Alinur Yunashev
88	DF	KAZ	Madi Khaseyn
90	FW	BUL	Martin Toshev (to (Romania) Academica Clinceni)
