= List of Kazakhstan football transfers summer 2021 =

This is a list of Kazakh football transfers in the summer transfer window 2021 by club, running from 1 July to 29 July. Only clubs of the 2021 Kazakhstan Premier League are included.

== Kazakhstan Premier League 2021 ==
=== Aktobe ===
In: Note: Flags indicate national team as defined under FIFA eligibility rules; some limited exceptions apply. Players may hold more than one non-FIFA nationality.

No.	Pos.	Nation	Player
26	MF	KAZ	Ramazan Orazov (from (Russia) Chayka Peschanokopskoye)
27	DF	KAZ	Yury Logvinenko
29	MF	GEO	Zaza Tsitskishvili (from (Georgia (country)) Telavi)
33	FW	BLR	Ihar Zyankovich (from (Russia) Minsk)
39	MF	RUS	Nikita Laktionov (from (Russia) Rodina Moscow)
50	MF	GHA	Joachim Adukor (from (Bosnia and Herzegovina) Sarajevo)
66	DF	RUS	Igor Gubanov
70	MF	UKR	Dmytro Korkishko (from (Ukraine) Chornomorets Odesa)
77	DF	KAZ	Dmitry Shomko (from (Russia) Rotor Volgograd)
80	DF	KAZ	Temirlan Yerlanov (from (Kazakhstan) Ordabasy)
91	MF	UKR	Vitaliy Balashov (from (Kazakhstan) Shakhter Karagandy)

Out: Note: Flags indicate national team as defined under FIFA eligibility rules; some limited exceptions apply. Players may hold more than one non-FIFA nationality.

No.	Pos.	Nation	Player
3	DF	GEO	Lasha Totadze (to (Georgia (country)) Gagra)
4	DF	KAZ	Demiyat Slambekov (to (Kazakhstan) Aksu)
5	DF	ARM	Armen Manucharyan (to (Armenia) Urartu)
9	FW	SRB	Bojan Dubajić (to (Cyprus) Enosis Neon)
11	FW	UZB	Igor Sergeev (to (Kazakhstan) Tobol)
22	MF	RUS	Vitali Volkov
66	DF	RUS	Igor Gubanov (to (Russia) SKA Rostov-on-Don)

=== Akzhayik ===
In: Note: Flags indicate national team as defined under FIFA eligibility rules; some limited exceptions apply. Players may hold more than one non-FIFA nationality.

No.	Pos.	Nation	Player
11	FW	MOZ	Reginaldo (from (North Macedonia) Shkupi)
33	MF	GEO	Luka Imnadze (from (Azerbaijan) Sabail)
57	GK	MDA	Ștefan Sicaci (from (Georgia (country)) Samtredia)
88	MF	RUS	Mikhail Gashchenkov (from (Russia) Nizhny Novgorod)

Out: Note: Flags indicate national team as defined under FIFA eligibility rules; some limited exceptions apply. Players may hold more than one non-FIFA nationality.

No.	Pos.	Nation	Player
9	FW	RUS	Dmitri Michurenkov (to (Russia) SKA Rostov-on-Don)
11	FW	KAZ	Vyacheslav Shvyrev (loan return to (Kazakhstan) Kairat)
13	DF	BLR	Pavel Nazarenko (to (Kazakhstan) Shakhter Karagandy)
16	GK	KAZ	Ilya Karavaev
33	MF	KAZ	Magomed Paragulgov
71	MF	RUS	Marat Burayev (to (Belarus) Slutsk)
88	FW	KAZ	Erzhan Ibragimov

=== Astana ===
In: Note: Flags indicate national team as defined under FIFA eligibility rules; some limited exceptions apply. Players may hold more than one non-FIFA nationality.

No.	Pos.	Nation	Player
17	FW	KAZ	Abat Aymbetov (loan extended from (Russia) Krylia Sovetov)
20	FW	MNE	Fatos Bećiraj (from (Poland) Wisła Kraków)
26	DF	ALB	Eneo Bitri (from (Albania) Partizani Tirana)
77	MF	POR	Pedro Eugénio (from (Kazakhstan) Taraz)

Out: Note: Flags indicate national team as defined under FIFA eligibility rules; some limited exceptions apply. Players may hold more than one non-FIFA nationality.

No.	Pos.	Nation	Player
3	DF	ARM	Varazdat Haroyan (to (Spain) Cadiz)
9	MF	ROU	Dorin Rotariu (to (Bulgaria) Ludogorets Razgrad)
32	FW	CUW	Rangelo Janga (on loan to (Cyprus) Apollon Limassol, previously on loan to (Netherlands) NEC Nijmegen)
45	FW	KAZ	Roman Murtazayev (to (Russia) Baltika Kaliningrad)
99	FW	BIH	Semir Smajlagić (on loan to (Kazakhstan) Kyzylzhar)

=== Atyrau ===
In: Note: Flags indicate national team as defined under FIFA eligibility rules; some limited exceptions apply. Players may hold more than one non-FIFA nationality.

No.	Pos.	Nation	Player
31	MF	BLR	Vladimir Medved (from (Russia) Rotor Volgograd)
99	FW	BRA	Allef (from (Russia) Baltika Kaliningrad)

Out: Note: Flags indicate national team as defined under FIFA eligibility rules; some limited exceptions apply. Players may hold more than one non-FIFA nationality.

No.	Pos.	Nation	Player
2	DF	KAZ	Dauren Mazhitov
18	DF	KAZ	Kuanysh Kalmuratov (on loan to (Kazakhstan) Turan)
90	MF	KOS	Donjet Shkodra
99	FW	BIH	Petar Kunić (to (Serbia) Napredak Kruševac)

=== Caspiy ===
In: Note: Flags indicate national team as defined under FIFA eligibility rules; some limited exceptions apply. Players may hold more than one non-FIFA nationality.

No.	Pos.	Nation	Player
8	FW	BLR	Uladzimir Khvashchynski (loan from (Belarus) Dinamo Minsk)
15	MF	KAZ	Jean-Ali Payruz (loan from (Kazakhstan) Shakhter Karagandy)

Out: Note: Flags indicate national team as defined under FIFA eligibility rules; some limited exceptions apply. Players may hold more than one non-FIFA nationality.

No.	Pos.	Nation	Player
8	MF	SRB	Stefan Bukorac (loan to (Kazakhstan) Shakhter Karagandy)
15	FW	RUS	David Karayev (loan return to (Russia) Ural Yekaterinburg)
47	MF	KAZ	Arman Nusip (to (Kazakhstan) Taraz)
77	MF	TUN	Wajdi Sahli (to (Greece) Apollon Smyrnis)

=== Kairat ===
In: Note: Flags indicate national team as defined under FIFA eligibility rules; some limited exceptions apply. Players may hold more than one non-FIFA nationality.

No.	Pos.	Nation	Player
11	MF	KAZ	Yan Vorogovsky (from (Belgium) K Beerschot VA)
15	DF	CMR	Macky Bagnack (from (Serbia) Partizan)
16	MF	POR	Ricardo Alves (from (Russia) Krylia Sovetov)
25	FW	BRA	João Paulo (from (Kazakhstan) Ordabasy)

Out: Note: Flags indicate national team as defined under FIFA eligibility rules; some limited exceptions apply. Players may hold more than one non-FIFA nationality.

No.	Pos.	Nation	Player
10	FW	GER	Streli Mamba (loan to (Germany) Hansa Rostock)
11	FW	UKR	Aderinsola Eseola (to (Ukraine) Vorskla Poltava)
17	MF	KAZ	Sultanbek Astanov (on loan to (Kazakhstan) Ordabasy)
31	GK	KAZ	Dinmukhammed Zhomart (to (Russia) Kairat Moscow)
—	FW	RUS	Kirill Kolesnichenko (to (Russia) Ural Yekaterinburg)
—	FW	KAZ	Aybar Abdulla (to (Russia) Kairat Moscow)
—	FW	KAZ	Vyacheslav Shvyrev (loan to (Russia) Kairat Moscow)

=== Kaisar ===
In: Note: Flags indicate national team as defined under FIFA eligibility rules; some limited exceptions apply. Players may hold more than one non-FIFA nationality.

No.	Pos.	Nation	Player
24	DF	RUS	Mikhail Mishchenko

Out: Note: Flags indicate national team as defined under FIFA eligibility rules; some limited exceptions apply. Players may hold more than one non-FIFA nationality.

No.	Pos.	Nation	Player
23	DF	KAZ	Timur Rudoselsky (to (Armenia) Sevan)
24	DF	BLR	Sergey Karpovich (to (Russia) Baltika Kaliningrad)

=== Kyzylzhar ===
In: Note: Flags indicate national team as defined under FIFA eligibility rules; some limited exceptions apply. Players may hold more than one non-FIFA nationality.

No.	Pos.	Nation	Player
9	FW	BIH	Semir Smajlagić (on loan from (Kazakhstan) Astana)
10	FW	RUS	Pavel Yakovlev (from (Russia) Fakel Voronezh)
20	MF	POR	Carlos Fonseca (from (Kazakhstan) Tobol)

Out: Note: Flags indicate national team as defined under FIFA eligibility rules; some limited exceptions apply. Players may hold more than one non-FIFA nationality.

No.	Pos.	Nation	Player
9	FW	BRA	Danilo Almeida (to (Thailand) Suphanburi)
14	FW	SRB	Nemanja Obradović
20	DF	KAZ	Viktor Gunchenko
27	FW	KGZ	Ernist Batyrkanov (to (Armenia) Van)
40	DF	KAZ	Ildar Aitov

=== Ordabasy ===
In: Note: Flags indicate national team as defined under FIFA eligibility rules; some limited exceptions apply. Players may hold more than one non-FIFA nationality.

No.	Pos.	Nation	Player
4	DF	KAZ	Kanat Ashirbay (from (Kazakhstan) Kyran)
6	DF	KAZ	Karam Sultanov (from (Azerbaijan) Sumgayit)
7	MF	TJK	Muhammadjon Rakhimov (from (Tajikistan) Istiklol)
17	MF	KAZ	Sultanbek Astanov (on loan from (Kazakhstan) Kairat)
94	FW	UKR	Dmytro Khlyobas (from (Ukraine) Kolos Kovalivka)

Out: Note: Flags indicate national team as defined under FIFA eligibility rules; some limited exceptions apply. Players may hold more than one non-FIFA nationality.

No.	Pos.	Nation	Player
5	DF	KAZ	Damir Dautov (to (Kazakhstan) Zhetysu)
7	MF	RSA	May Mahlangu
8	DF	KAZ	Temirlan Yerlanov (to (Kazakhstan) Aktobe)
10	MF	BIH	Mirzad Mehanović (to (Bosnia and Herzegovina) Tuzla City)
11	MF	POR	Rúben Brígido (to (Kazakhstan) Tobol)
17	DF	KAZ	Bagdat Kairov (to (Kazakhstan) Tobol)
27	MF	KAZ	Timur Dosmagambetov (to (Kazakhstan) Taraz)
37	FW	BRA	João Paulo (to (Kazakhstan) Kairat)
42	GK	KAZ	Igor Trofimets (to (Kazakhstan) Shakhter Karagandy)

=== Shakhter Karagandy ===
In: Note: Flags indicate national team as defined under FIFA eligibility rules; some limited exceptions apply. Players may hold more than one non-FIFA nationality.

No.	Pos.	Nation	Player
1	GK	KAZ	Igor Trofimets (from (Kazakhstan) Ordabasy)
8	MF	SRB	Stefan Bukorac (loan from (Kazakhstan) Caspiy)
10	FW	RUS	Idris Umayev (loan from (Russia) Akhmat Grozny)
13	DF	BLR	Pavel Nazarenko (from (Kazakhstan) Akzhayik)
15	MF	GHA	David Mawutor (from (Poland) Wisła Kraków)
19	FW	KAZ	Oralkhan Omirtayev (from (Kazakhstan) Tobol)
27	DF	RUS	Vladimir Khozin (from (Russia) Chayka Peschanokopskoye)
33	DF	CMR	Abdel Lamanje (from (Romania) Astra Giurgiu)
44	MF	BIH	Edin Rustemović (from (Bosnia and Herzegovina) Tuzla City)
99	FW	BLR	Yevgeniy Shikavka (from (Belarus) Dinamo Minsk)

Out: Note: Flags indicate national team as defined under FIFA eligibility rules; some limited exceptions apply. Players may hold more than one non-FIFA nationality.

No.	Pos.	Nation	Player
4	DF	GHA	Gideon Baah
10	FW	UKR	Vitaliy Balashov (to (Kazakhstan) Aktobe)
23	MF	KAZ	Ruslan Tutkyshev
33	DF	RUS	Yevgeny Gapon (to (Russia) Kuban Krasnodar)
35	GK	KAZ	Ernar Sailauov
39	MF	BEL	Ziguy Badibanga
44	DF	KAZ	Karam Sultanov
70	MF	KAZ	Jean-Ali Payruz (loan to (Kazakhstan) Caspiy)
78	GK	KAZ	Timurbek Zakirov
91	FW	UKR	Yevhen Pavlov
99	FW	NGA	Joseph Adah

=== Taraz ===
In: Note: Flags indicate national team as defined under FIFA eligibility rules; some limited exceptions apply. Players may hold more than one non-FIFA nationality.

No.	Pos.	Nation	Player
83	MF	KAZ	Timur Dosmagambetov (from (Kazakhstan) Ordabasy)
84	FW	POR	Erivaldo (from (Bulgaria) Beroe Stara Zagora)
85	MF	SRB	Uroš Nenadović (from (Armenia) Ararat Yerevan)
—	MF	KAZ	Arman Nusip (from (Kazakhstan) Caspiy)
—	MF	KAZ	Ulan Konysbayev

Out: Note: Flags indicate national team as defined under FIFA eligibility rules; some limited exceptions apply. Players may hold more than one non-FIFA nationality.

No.	Pos.	Nation	Player
33	FW	POR	Pedro Eugénio (to (Kazakhstan) Astana)
77	MF	KAZ	Kurmet Karaman

=== Tobol ===
In: Note: Flags indicate national team as defined under FIFA eligibility rules; some limited exceptions apply. Players may hold more than one non-FIFA nationality.

No.	Pos.	Nation	Player
18	MF	POR	Rúben Brígido (from (Kazakhstan) Ordabasy)
24	DF	KAZ	Bagdat Kairov (from (Kazakhstan) Ordabasy)
29	MF	SRB	Dušan Jovančić (from (Turkey) Çaykur Rizespor, previously on loan)
77	FW	UZB	Igor Sergeev (from (Kazakhstan) Aktobe)

Out: Note: Flags indicate national team as defined under FIFA eligibility rules; some limited exceptions apply. Players may hold more than one non-FIFA nationality.

No.	Pos.	Nation	Player
19	FW	KAZ	Oralkhan Omirtayev (to (Kazakhstan) Shakhter Karagandy)
23	FW	SRB	Nemanja Nikolić
40	MF	POR	Carlos Fonseca (to (Kazakhstan) Kyzylzhar)

=== Turan ===
In: Note: Flags indicate national team as defined under FIFA eligibility rules; some limited exceptions apply. Players may hold more than one non-FIFA nationality.

No.	Pos.	Nation	Player
3	DF	KGZ	Tamirlan Kozubayev (from (Russia) Shinnik Yaroslavl)
18	DF	KAZ	Kuanysh Kalmuratov (on loan from (Kazakhstan) Atyrau)
29	MF	KGZ	Farhat Musabekov (from (Kyrgyzstan) Dordoi Bishkek)
78	FW	KAZ	Pavel Kriventsov (from (Kazakhstan) Kyzylzhar)
89	DF	UKR	Yevhen Chumak (from (Uzbekistan) Metallurg Bekabad)
95	FW	MKD	Samir Fazli (from (North Macedonia) Makedonija Gjorče Petrov)
—	DF	KAZ	Bekzhan Abdrakhman (from (North Macedonia) Kyran)

Out: Note: Flags indicate national team as defined under FIFA eligibility rules; some limited exceptions apply. Players may hold more than one non-FIFA nationality.

No.	Pos.	Nation	Player
3	DF	KAZ	Nurlan Dairov
13	DF	KAZ	Ermek Kuantaev

=== Zhetysu ===
In: Note: Flags indicate national team as defined under FIFA eligibility rules; some limited exceptions apply. Players may hold more than one non-FIFA nationality.

No.	Pos.	Nation	Player
20	MF	GEO	Tengiz Tsikaridze (from (Russia) Tom Tomsk)
25	FW	NGA	Ugochukwu Oduenyi (from (Ukraine) Mynai)
26	DF	KAZ	Damir Dautov (from (Kazakhstan) Ordabasy)
55	DF	UKR	Rizvan Ablitarov (from (Ukraine) Olimpik Donetsk)
77	DF	UKR	Temur Partsvania (from (Ukraine) Mykolaiv)

Out: Note: Flags indicate national team as defined under FIFA eligibility rules; some limited exceptions apply. Players may hold more than one non-FIFA nationality.

No.	Pos.	Nation	Player
5	DF	KAZ	Aleksandr Kislitsyn
12	DF	NGA	Philip Ipole (to (Russia) Olimp-Dolgoprudny)
20	DF	NGA	Aliyu Abubakar
25	MF	RUS	Denis Poyarkov (to (Russia) Metallurg Lipetsk)
27	DF	KAZ	Andrey Shabaev
77	MF	KAZ	Akmal Bakhtiyarov (to (Russia) Olimp-Dolgoprudny)
99	FW	KAZ	Bauyrzhan Turysbek
