= 2017–18 FC Pyunik season =

Pyunik
2017-18 season
- Chairman: Rafik Hayrapetyan
- Manager: Armen Gyulbudaghyants (16 June-8 August); Aleksei Yeryomenko (8 August-31 October); Armen Gyulbudaghyants (from 31 October)
- Stadium: Vazgen Sargsyan Republican Stadium
- Armenian Premier League: 5th
- Armenian Cup: Quarterfinal vs Banants
- Europa League: First qualifying round vs Slovan Bratislava
- Top goalscorer: League: Alik Arakelyan (7); All: Petros Avetisyan (9)

The 2017–18 season is Pyunik's 24th season in the Armenian Premier League.

== Season events ==
Prior to the start of the season, Armen Gyulbudaghyants was appointed as the club's manager on 16 June. Less than two-months later, on 8 August 2017, Aleksei Yeryomenko signed a one-year contract with Pyunik to be their manager, but left the club on 31 October 2017, with Armen Gyulbudaghyants returning to manage the team.

== Squad ==
As of 28 February 2018

Note: Flags indicate national team as defined under FIFA eligibility rules; some limited exceptions apply. Players may hold more than one non-FIFA nationality.

| No. | Pos. | Nation | Player |
|---|---|---|---|
| 1 | GK | ARM | Gor Manukyan |
| 2 | DF | ARM | Serob Grigoryan |
| 3 | DF | ARM | Artur Kartashyan |
| 4 | DF | ARM | Aram Shakhnazaryan |
| 5 | DF | ARM | Armen Manucharyan |
| 6 | MF | ARM | Narek Aslanyan (vice-captain) |
| 7 | MF | ARM | Petros Avetisyan |
| 8 | FW | ARM | Karen Khatuev |
| 9 | FW | ARM | Robert Minasyan |
| 10 | MF | ARM | Erik Vardanyan |
| 11 | MF | ARM | Hovhannes Poghosyan |
| 13 | GK | ARM | Valeriy Voskonyan |
| 15 | MF | RUS | Marat Burayev |
| 16 | DF | ARM | Robert Hakobyan |
| 17 | FW | ARM | Hovhannes Ilangyozyan |
| 18 | MF | ARM | Alik Arakelyan |

| No. | Pos. | Nation | Player |
|---|---|---|---|
| 19 | MF | ARM | Karlen Mkrtchyan |
| 20 | FW | CIV | Drissa Diarrassouba |
| 21 | FW | ARM | Erik Petrosyan |
| 22 | GK | ARM | Sevak Aslanyan |
| 23 | DF | ARM | Hovhannes Nazaryan |
| 24 | DF | GBS | Bacar Baldé |
| 25 | MF | ARM | Vigen Begoyan |
| 26 | MF | ARM | Artur Nadiryan |
| 30 | MF | ARM | Vahagn Hayrapetyan |
| 32 | GK | ARM | Vardan Shahatuni |
| 33 | DF | CIV | Didier Kadio |
| 66 | MF | NGR | Marshal Johnson |
| — | DF | ARM | Levon Hayrapetyan (captain) |
| — | MF | ARM | Samvel Spertsyan |
| — | FW | ARM | Razmik Hakobyan |

== Transfers ==
=== In ===
| Date | Position | Nationality | Name | From | Fee | Ref. |
|---|---|---|---|---|---|---|
| Summer 2017 | DF | (Ivory Coast) | Didier Kadio | Shakhter Karagandy | Undisclosed | |
| Summer 2017 | MF | (Armenia) | Vladimir Babayan | Banants | Undisclosed | |
| Summer 2017 | MF | (Armenia) | Karlen Mkrtchyan | | | |
| Summer 2017 | MF | (Russia) | Maksim Yermakov | | | |
| Summer 2017 | FW | (Armenia) | Artur Miranyan | | | |
| Summer 2017 | FW | (Brazil) | William Araujo | Corinthians Alagoano | Undisclosed | |
| 1 August 2017 | FW | (Armenia) | Hovhannes Ilangyozyan | Banants | Undisclosed | |
| 3 August 2017 | DF | (Armenia) | Levon Hayrapetyan | Paykan | Undisclosed | |
| Winter 2018 | DF | (Guinea-Bissau) | Bacar Baldé | Samtredia | Undisclosed | |
| Winter 2018 | MF | (Russia) | Marat Burayev | Spartak Vladikavkaz | Undisclosed | |
| Winter 2018 | FW | (Ivory Coast) | Drissa Diarrassouba | | | |
| 1 March 2018 | MF | (Nigeria) | Marshal Johnson | Hapoel Afula | Undisclosed | |

=== Out ===
| Date | Position | Nationality | Name | To | Fee | Ref. |
|---|---|---|---|---|---|---|
| 2 August 2017 | FW | (Armenia) | Vardan Pogosyan | Rabotnički | Undisclosed | |

=== Released ===
| Date | Position | Nationality | Name | Joined | Date |
|---|---|---|---|---|---|
| Summer 2017 | DF | (Armenia) | Armen Nahapetyan | Avan Academy | |
| Summer 2017 | MF | (Armenia) | Hovhannes Harutyunyan | Avan Academy | |
| 4 December 2017 | MF | (Russia) | Maksim Yermakov | Artsakh | 2018 |
| 4 December 2017 | FW | (Brazil) | William Araujo | | |
| Winter 2018 | GK | (Armenia) | Valeriy Voskonyan | | |
| Winter 2018 | DF | (Armenia) | David Terteryan | Gandzasar Kapan | |
| Winter 2018 | MF | (Armenia) | Vladimir Babayan | | |
| Winter 2018 | MF | (Armenia) | Davit Baghdasaryan | | |
| Winter 2018 | FW | (Armenia) | Artur Miranyan | Pyunik | Winter 2019 |

== Friendlies ==
| 25 January 2018 | Pyunik (Armenia) | 0 – 6 | (Ukraine) Oleksandriya | Alanya, Turkey |
| (UTC+4) | | Report | Goal |

| 30 January 2018 | Pyunik (Armenia) | 0 – 1 | (Bulgaria) Pirin Blagoevgrad | Alanya, Turkey |
| (UTC+4) | | Report | Goal |

| 2 February 2018 | Pyunik (Armenia) | 0 – 0 | (Bulgaria) Botev Plovdiv | Alanya, Turkey |
| (UTC+4) | | Report | Goal |

| 15 February 2018 | Ayia Napa U-18 (Cyprus) | 0 – 11 | (Armenia) Pyunik | Ayia Napa, Cyprus |
| (UTC+4) | | Report | Avetisyan; Kartashyan; Vardanyan; A.Nadiryan; Aslanyan; Manucharyan; R.Hakobyan |

| 21 February 2018 | Pyunik (Armenia) | 2 – 0 | (Russia) Rotor Volgograd | Ayia Napa, Cyprus |
| (UTC+4) | Diarrassouba; E.Petrosyan | Report |

== Competitions ==
=== Overall record ===
| Competition | First match | Last match | Starting round | Final position | Record | | | | | | | |
| Competition | First match | Last match | Starting round | Final position | Pld | W | D | L | GF | GA | GD | Win % |
|---|---|---|---|---|---|---|---|---|---|---|---|---|
| Premier League | 6 August 2017 | 20 May 2018 | Matchday 1 | 5th | 30 | 9 | 9 | 12 | 37 | 41 | −4 | 30.00 |
| Armenian Cup | 20 September 2017 | 25 October 2017 | Quarterfinal | Quarterfinal | 2 | 0 | 1 | 1 | 2 | 4 | −2 | 0.00 |
| UEFA Europa League | 12 July 2018 | 16 August 2018 | First qualifying round | First qualifying round | 2 | 0 | 0 | 2 | 1 | 9 | −8 | 0.00 |
| Total | | | | | 34 | 9 | 10 | 15 | 40 | 54 | −14 | 26.47 |

Last updated: 20 May 2018
Source: Competitions

=== Premier League ===
==== Results ====
| 6 August 2017 1 | Banants | 2 – 2 | Pyunik | Yerevan |
| 18:00 (UTC+4) | Gyozalyan 77'; Injac 90' (yellow card) 90' | Report | A.Arakelyan 5', 47'; R.Minasyan (yellow card) 27'; V.Hayrapetyan (yellow card) 32'; S.Spertsyan (yellow card) 86' | Stadium: Banants Stadium; Attendance: 500; Referee: Artur Simonyan |

| 11 August 2017 2 | Pyunik | 2 – 1 | Gandzasar Kapan | Yerevan |
| 19:00 (UTC+4) | A.Arakelyan 34'; Yermakov (yellow card) 37'; A.Kartashyan (yellow card) 59'; R.Minasyan 75'; H.Ilangyozyan (yellow card) 76' | Report | A.Khachatryan (yellow card) 44'; Junior 45' | Stadium: Vazgen Sargsyan Republican Stadium; Attendance: 700; Referee: Zaven Hovhannisyan |

| 20 August 2017 3 | Ararat Yerevan | 0 – 0 | Pyunik | Yerevan |
| 17:00 (UTC+4) | Al.Petrosyan (yellow card) 45'; G.Kirakosyan (yellow card) 90+4' | Report | R.Hakobyan (yellow card) 35' | Stadium: Mika Stadium; Attendance: 650; Referee: Zaven Hovhannisyan |

| 25 August 2017 4 | Alashkert | 5 – 1 | Pyunik | Yerevan |
| 17:00 (UTC+4) | Arta.Yedigaryan 14', 31', 39'; Nenadović 28'; K.Veranyan 59' | Report | A.Arakelyan 30'; A.Kartashyan (yellow card) 76' | Stadium: Alashkert Stadium; Attendance: 500; Referee: Suren Baliyan |

| 10 September 2017 5 | Pyunik | 0 – 2 | Shirak | Yerevan |
| 18:00 (UTC+4) | A.Shakhnazaryan (yellow card) 4' | Report | Udo (yellow card) 20'; M.Bakayoko 44'; Stanojević 75'; A.Mikaelyan (yellow card) 88' | Stadium: Vazgen Sargsyan Republican Stadium; Attendance: 500; Referee: Zaven Hovhannisyan |

| 15 September 2017 6 | Pyunik | 1 – 2 | Banants | Yerevan |
| 18:00 (UTC+4) | Grigoryan (yellow card) 36'; R.Minasyan (yellow card) 45' (goal) 70' | Report | Gyozalyan 28', 31' (pen.); Wal (yellow card) 86' | Stadium: Vazgen Sargsyan Republican Stadium; Attendance: 300; Referee: Suren Baliyan |

| 23 September 2017 7 | Gandzasar Kapan | 3 – 1 | Pyunik | Yerevan |
| 18:00 (UTC+4) | Musonda (yellow card) 40'; V.Minasyan 45+2'; G.Harutyunyan 53'; Junior 69'; As.Karapetyan (yellow card) 86'; Ishkhanyan (yellow card) 87' | Report | Yermakov (yellow card) 45'; Vardanyan 90'; A.Manucharyan (yellow card) 90+2' | Stadium: Vazgen Sargsyan Republican Stadium; Attendance: 300; Referee: Artur Safaryan |

| 30 September 2017 8 | Pyunik | – | Ararat Yerevan | Yerevan |
| (UTC+4) | | Report | | Stadium: Vazgen Sargsyan Republican Stadium |

| 15 October 2017 9 | Pyunik | 0 – 1 | Alashkert | Yerevan |
| 19:00 (UTC+4) | A.Manucharyan (yellow card) 54'; V.Hayrapetyan (yellow card) 67'; A.Kartashyan (yellow card) 71' | Report | Simonyan 7'; Grigoryan (yellow card) 28'; Arakelyan (yellow card) 43'; Peltier (yellow card) 71' | Stadium: Vazgen Sargsyan Republican Stadium; Attendance: 300; Referee: Artur Simonyan |

| 21 October 2017 10 | Shirak | 0 – 0 | Pyunik | Gyumri |
| 15:00 (UTC+4) | R.Darbinyan (yellow card) 20'; Udo (yellow card) 62'; M.Kaba (yellow card) 73'; A.Mikaelyan (yellow card) 76'; V.Bakalyan (yellow card) 90'; A.Ayvazov (yellow card) 90+5' | Report | Kadio (yellow card) 11' (yellow-red card) 50'; A.Kartashyan (yellow card) 24'; Vardanyan (yellow card) 65' | Stadium: Gyumri City Stadium; Attendance: 400; Referee: Gevorg Eghoyan |

| 28 October 2017 11 | Banants | 1 – 1 | Pyunik | Yerevan |
| 15:00 (UTC+4) | Injac (yellow card) 31'; K.Sibo (yellow card) 43'; Hovsepyan 73'; G. Hovhannisyan (yellow card) 80' | Report | Grigoryan (yellow card) 7'; Avetisyan 67'; A.Kartashyan (yellow card) 83' | Stadium: Banants Stadium; Attendance: 300; Referee: Artur Simonyan |

| 4 November 2017 12 | Pyunik | 0 – 0 | Gandzasar Kapan | Yerevan |
| 16:00 (UTC+4) | Vardanyan (yellow card) 28' | Report | Ishkhanyan (yellow card) 8'; Adamyan (yellow card) 52'; S.Shahinyan (yellow card) 73' | Stadium: Vazgen Sargsyan Republican Stadium; Attendance: 300; Referee: Suren Baliyan |

| 19 November 2017 13 | Ararat Yerevan | 0 – 1 | Pyunik | Yerevan |
| 15:00 (UTC+4) | S.Metoyan (yellow card) 43'; An.Kocharyan (yellow card) 83' | Report | Avetisyan (yellow card) 37'; A.Manucharyan (yellow card) 46' (yellow-red card) 73'; A.Shakhnazaryan (yellow card) 75'; Miranyan 76' | Stadium: Alashkert Stadium; Attendance: 300; Referee: Artur Simonyan |

| 24 November 2017 14 | Alashkert | 1 – 0 | Pyunik | Yerevan |
| 15:00 (UTC+4) | M.Manasyan 23'; K.Veranyan (yellow card) 58' (yellow-red card) 67'; Voskanyan (yellow card) 83' | Report | | Stadium: Alashkert Stadium; Attendance: 400; Referee: Gevorg Eghoyan |

| 29 November 2017 8 | Pyunik | 4 – 0 | Ararat Yerevan | Yerevan |
| 16:00 (UTC+4) | R.Minasyan 8'; Mkrtchyan 27' (yellow card) 69'; R.Yeghiazaryan 42' (o.g.); A.Manucharyan (yellow card) 55'; V.Hayrapetyan (yellow card) 60'; A.Arakelyan (yellow card) 77'; Avetisyan 90+1' | Report | Gareginyan (yellow card) 62' | Stadium: Vazgen Sargsyan Republican Stadium; Attendance: 300 |
Note: Match originally scheduled for 30 September 2017.

| 2 December 2017 15 | Pyunik | 3 – 2 | Shirak | Yerevan |
| 16:00 (UTC+4) | Vardanyan 10'; Avetisyan 37' (pen.); V.Hayrapetyan (yellow card) 31'; Kadio (yellow card) 71' (goal) 90+3'; A.Kartashyan (yellow card) 86'; Grigoryan (yellow card) 90+5'; N.Aslanyan (yellow card) 90+5' | Report | A.Ayvazov (yellow card) 37'; A.Mikaelyan (yellow card) 69'; M.Kaba (yellow card) 72'; A.Muradyan (yellow card) 75'; Udo 13', 68' (yellow card) 90+5' | Stadium: Vazgen Sargsyan Republican Stadium; Attendance: 800; Referee: Suren Baliyan |

| 28 February 2017 16 | Pyunik | 2 – 0 | Banants | Yerevan |
| 14:00 (UTC+4) | Avetisyan (yellow card) 25' (goal) 28', 88' (pen.); R.Hakobyan (yellow card) 51'; Mkrtchyan (yellow card) 66'; Baldé (yellow card) 84' | Report | A.Loretsyan (yellow card) 8'; H.Voskanyan (yellow card) 40'; Hovsepyan (yellow card) 78'; A.Avagyan (yellow card) 85' | Stadium: Vazgen Sargsyan Republican Stadium; Attendance: 300; Referee: Suren Baliyan |

| 4 March 2018 17 | Gandzasar Kapan | 1 – 0 | Pyunik | Yerevan |
| 16:00 (UTC+4) | Junior 5' (pen.); Terteryan (yellow card) 13' | Report | Baldé (yellow card) 41'; Kadio (yellow card) 69' | Stadium: Vazgen Sargsyan Republican Stadium; Attendance: 800; Referee: Artur Simonyan |

| 11 March 2018 18 | Pyunik | 3 – 3 | Ararat Yerevan | Yerevan |
| 14:00 (UTC+4) | Diarrassouba 17', 57'; R.Hakobyan 25'; A.Manucharyan (yellow card) 48' | Report | G.Ohanyan 52'; R.Safaryan (yellow card) 55'; Obradović (yellow card) 74'; O.Hamvardzumyan 77', 90' | Stadium: Vazgen Sargsyan Republican Stadium; Attendance: 300 |

| 17 March 2018 19 | Pyunik | 3 – 1 | Alashkert | Yerevan |
| 14:00 (UTC+4) | Diarrassouba 16'; A.Arakelyan 22'; Avetisyan 45+2'; R.Hakobyan (yellow card) 69' | Report | A.Voskanyan (yellow card) 1'; Daghbashyan (yellow card) 23'; Simonyan (yellow card) 53'; Omoregie 58'; Morozov (yellow card) 65' | Stadium: Vazgen Sargsyan Republican Stadium; Attendance: 600; Referee: Artur Simonyan |

| 31 March 2018 20 | Shirak | 2 – 0 | Pyunik | Gyumri |
| 15:00 (UTC+4) | V.Bakalyan 61'; M.Bakayoko 82' | Report | A.Kartashyan (yellow card) 16'; Mkrtchyan (yellow card) 42' | Stadium: Gyumri City Stadium; Referee: Zaven Hovhannisyan |

| 4 April 2018 21 | Banants | 2 – 0 | Pyunik | Yerevan |
| 15:00 (UTC+4) | Jovanović (yellow card) 41'; Peltier (yellow card) 44' (goal) 78'; Ayrapetyan (yellow card) 52'; Hovsepyan 54' | Report | V.Voskonyan (yellow card) 78' | Stadium: Banants Stadium; Attendance: 700; Referee: Suren Baliyan |

| 7 April 2018 22 | Pyunik | 2 – 1 | Gandzasar Kapan | Yerevan |
| 13:00 (UTC+4) | Vardanyan 60' (yellow card) 72'; A.Arakelyan (yellow card) 65'; Diarrassouba 88' | Report | Živković (yellow card) 70'; Junior 77' | Stadium: Vazgen Sargsyan Republican Stadium; Attendance: 300; Referee: Artur Simonyan |

| 15 April 2018 23 | Ararat Yerevan | 1 – 1 | Pyunik | Yerevan |
| 17:00 (UTC+4) | G.Ohanyan 45+1' | Report | Burayev 2' | Stadium: Alashkert Stadium; Attendance: 100; Referee: Artur Simonyan |

| 22 April 2018 24 | Alashkert | 0 – 0 | Pyunik | Yerevan |
| 17:00 (UTC+4) | | Report | Vardanyan (yellow card) 31' | Stadium: Alashkert Stadium; Attendance: 200; Referee: Suren Baliyan |

| 29 April 2018 25 | Pyunik | 1 – 2 | Shirak | Yerevan |
| 16:00 (UTC+4) | H.Poghosyan 63' | Report | Stanojević 12'; M.Bakayoko 36' | Stadium: Vazgen Sargsyan Republican Stadium; Attendance: 500; Referee: Artur Simonyan |

| 2 May 2018 26 | Pyunik | 2 – 1 | Banants | Yerevan |
| 20:00 (UTC+4) | A.Nadiryan (yellow card) 37'; Kadio 81'; Diarrassouba 88'; V.Voskonyan (yellow card) 90+1' | Report | Kpodo 66'; N.Petrosyan (yellow card) 87' | Stadium: Vazgen Sargsyan Republican Stadium; Attendance: 200; Referee: Artur Simonyan |

| 5 May 2018 27 | Gandzasar Kapan | 4 – 3 | Pyunik | Gyumri |
| 17:00 (UTC+4) | G.Harutyunyan 1' (yellow card) 56'; Musonda 22', 81'; Wbeymar 83' | Report | R.Minasyan 54'; A.Arakelyan 57', 84'; A.Shakhnazaryan (yellow card) 72'; Grigoryan (yellow card) 76'; Johnson (yellow card) 90' | Stadium: Gyumri City Stadium; Attendance: 80; Referee: Zaven Hovhannisyan |

| 8 May 2018 28 | Pyunik | 1 – 3 | Ararat Yerevan | Yerevan |
| 17:00 (UTC+4) | Vardanyan 1' | Report | Obradović (yellow card) 44'; S.Metoyan 70', 84' (yellow card) 89'; G.Tumbaryan 87' | Stadium: Vazgen Sargsyan Republican Stadium; Attendance: 100; Referee: Zaven Hovhannisyan |

| 12 May 2018 29 | Pyunik | 0 – 0 | Alashkert | Yerevan |
| 19:00 (UTC+4) | A.Kartashyan (yellow card) 67' | Report | Grigoryan (yellow card) 33'; M.Manasyan (yellow card) 42' | Stadium: Vazgen Sargsyan Republican Stadium; Attendance: 600; Referee: Artur Simonyan |

| 20 May 2018 30 | Shirak | 0 – 3 Awarded | Pyunik | Gyumri |
| (UTC+4) | | | | Stadium: Gyumri City Stadium |
Note: Shirak refused to the play the match after being docked 12 points due to a fixing scandal.

==== Table ====
| Pos | Team | Pld | W | D | L | GF | GA | GD | Pts | Qualification |
|---|---|---|---|---|---|---|---|---|---|---|
| 1 | Alashkert (C) | 30 | 14 | 8 | 8 | 44 | 31 | +13 | 50 | Qualification for the Champions League first qualifying round |
| 2 | Banants | 30 | 11 | 11 | 8 | 42 | 34 | +8 | 44 | Qualification for the Europa League first qualifying round (Note: Gandzasar Kapan qualified for the Europa League first qualifying round by winning the 2017–18 Armenian Cup.) |
| 3 | Gandzasar Kapan | 30 | 11 | 10 | 9 | 43 | 34 | +9 | 43 | Qualification for the Europa League first qualifying round |
| 4 | Shirak | 30 | 14 | 8 | 8 | 37 | 31 | +6 | 38 (Note: Shirak were deducted 12 points on decision of Disciplinary Committee, upheld on May 18, due to match fixing scandal.) | |
| 5 | Pyunik | 30 | 9 | 9 | 12 | 37 | 41 | −4 | 36 | Qualification for the Europa League first qualifying round |
| 6 | Ararat Yerevan | 30 | 5 | 6 | 19 | 33 | 65 | −32 | 21 | |

Source: Soccerway
Rules for classification: 1) Points; 2) Play-off (only if deciding champion); 3) Matches won; 4) Head-to-head points; 5) Head-to-head matches won; 6) Head-to-head goal difference; 7) Head-to-head goals scored; 8) Head-to-head away goals scored; 9) Goal difference; 10) Goals scored.
(C) Champions

=== Armenian Cup ===
| 20 September 2017 Quarterfinal 1st leg | Pyunik | 0 – 0 | Banants | Yerevan |
| 18:00 (UTC+4) | Grigoryan (yellow card) 19'; H.Ilangyozyan (yellow card) 43' | Report | Poghosyan (yellow card) 71'; Hovsepyan (yellow card) 81' | Stadium: Vazgen Sargsyan Republican Stadium; Attendance: 300; Referee: Gevorg Eghoyan |

| 25 October 2017 Quarterfinal 2nd leg | Banants | 4 – 2 (4 – 2 agg.) | Pyunik | Yerevan |
| 15:00 (UTC+4) | Injac 8', 24'; Hovsepyan 44'; G. Hovhannisyan (yellow card) 82'; Krasić 86' | Report | A.Manucharyan (yellow card) 34'; Avetisyan 40' (pen.), 89' (yellow card) 41'; Terteryan (yellow card) 67'; Vardanyan (yellow card) 81' | Stadium: Banants Stadium; Attendance: 300; Referee: Zaven Hovhannisyan |

=== UEFA Europa League ===
==== Qualifying rounds ====
| 29 June 2017 First qualifying round 1st leg | Pyunik (Armenia) | 1 – 4 | (Slovakia) Slovan Bratislava | Yerevan, Armenia |
| 19:00 (UTC+4) | Avetisyan 7' (pen.) | Report | Hološko 22', 68' de Kamps (yellow card) 54'; Savićević 62'; Shakhnazaryan 75' (o.g.) | Stadium: Vazgen Sargsyan Republican Stadium (Note: Pyunik played their home match at Vazgen Sargsyan Republican Stadium, Yerevan, instead of their regular stadium Football Academy Stadium, Yerevan.); Attendance: 1,800; Referee: Ádám Farkas (Hungary) |

| 6 July 2017 First qualifying round 2nd leg | Slovan Bratislava (Slovakia) | 5 – 0 (9 – 1 agg.) | (Armenia) Pyunik | Bratislava, Slovakia |
| 21:00 (UTC+4) | Mareš 10', 23', 64' de Kamps 62'; Sekulić 66'; Kubík (yellow card) 85' | Report | | Stadium: Štadión Pasienky; Attendance: 1,602; Referee: Bojan Nikolić (Serbia) |

== Statistics ==
As of match played 12 May 2018

=== Appearances and goals ===
| No. | Pos | Nat | Player | Total | | Premier League | | Armenian Cup | | UEFA Europa League | |
| No. | Pos | Nat | Player | Apps | Goals | Apps | Goals | Apps | Goals | Apps | Goals |
|---|---|---|---|---|---|---|---|---|---|---|---|
| 1 | GK | (Armenia) ARM | Gor Manukyan | 22 | 0 | 19 | 0 | 2 | 0 | 1 | 0 |
| 2 | DF | (Armenia) ARM | Serob Grigoryan | 27 | 0 | 19+4 | 0 | 2 | 0 | 2 | 0 |
| 3 | DF | (Armenia) ARM | Artur Kartashyan | 29 | 0 | 26 | 0 | 1 | 0 | 2 | 0 |
| 4 | DF | (Armenia) ARM | Aram Shakhnazaryan | 26 | 0 | 13+10 | 0 | 1 | 0 | 2 | 0 |
| 5 | DF | (Armenia) ARM | Armen Manucharyan | 30 | 0 | 25+1 | 0 | 2 | 0 | 2 | 0 |
| 6 | MF | (Armenia) ARM | Narek Aslanyan | 20 | 0 | 15+2 | 0 | 1 | 0 | 2 | 0 |
| 7 | MF | (Armenia) ARM | Petros Avetisyan | 19 | 8 | 12+3 | 6 | 2 | 2 | 2 | 0 |
| 8 | FW | (Armenia) ARM | Karen Khatuev | 6 | 0 | 4+1 | 0 | 0+1 | 0 | 0 | 0 |
| 9 | FW | (Armenia) ARM | Robert Minasyan | 20 | 4 | 9+10 | 4 | 1 | 0 | 0 | 0 |
| 10 | MF | (Armenia) ARM | Erik Vardanyan | 23 | 4 | 17+3 | 4 | 1+1 | 0 | 0+1 | 0 |
| 11 | MF | (Armenia) ARM | Hovhannes Poghosyan | 14 | 1 | 7+5 | 1 | 0 | 0 | 0+2 | 0 |
| 13 | GK | (Armenia) ARM | Valeriy Voskonyan | 11 | 0 | 10 | 0 | 0 | 0 | 1 | 0 |
| 15 | MF | (Russia) RUS | Marat Burayev | 9 | 1 | 4+5 | 1 | 0 | 0 | 0 | 0 |
| 16 | DF | (Armenia) ARM | Robert Hakobyan | 23 | 1 | 16+3 | 1 | 2 | 0 | 2 | 0 |
| 17 | FW | (Armenia) ARM | Hovhannes Ilangyozyan | 7 | 0 | 1+5 | 0 | 1 | 0 | 0 | 0 |
| 18 | MF | (Armenia) ARM | Alik Arakelyan | 28 | 7 | 23+2 | 7 | 0+1 | 0 | 2 | 0 |
| 19 | MF | (Armenia) ARM | Karlen Mkrtchyan | 17 | 1 | 16 | 1 | 0+1 | 0 | 0 | 0 |
| 20 | FW | (Ivory Coast) CIV | Drissa Diarrassouba | 12 | 5 | 12 | 5 | 0 | 0 | 0 | 0 |
| 21 | FW | (Armenia) ARM | Erik Petrosyan | 5 | 0 | 1+4 | 0 | 0 | 0 | 0 | 0 |
| 23 | DF | (Armenia) ARM | Hovhannes Nazaryan | 3 | 0 | 0+1 | 0 | 0 | 0 | 0+2 | 0 |
| 24 | DF | (Guinea-Bissau) GBS | Bacar Baldé | 8 | 0 | 5+3 | 0 | 0 | 0 | 0 | 0 |
| 26 | MF | (Armenia) ARM | Artur Nadiryan | 6 | 0 | 3+3 | 0 | 0 | 0 | 0 | 0 |
| 30 | MF | (Armenia) ARM | Vahagn Hayrapetyan | 26 | 1 | 18+5 | 1 | 2 | 0 | 0+1 | 0 |
| 33 | DF | (Ivory Coast) CIV | Didier Kadio | 18 | 2 | 18 | 2 | 0 | 0 | 0 | 0 |
| 66 | MF | (Nigeria) NGR | Marshal Johnson | 4 | 0 | 2+2 | 0 | 0 | 0 | 0 | 0 |
| | DF | (Armenia) ARM | Levon Hayrapetyan | 6 | 0 | 4+2 | 0 | 0 | 0 | 0 | 0 |
| | MF | (Armenia) ARM | Vladimir Babayan | 1 | 0 | 0+1 | 0 | 0 | 0 | 0 | 0 |
| | MF | (Armenia) ARM | Samvel Spertsyan | 2 | 0 | 0+2 | 0 | 0 | 0 | 0 | 0 |
Players who left Shirak during the season:
| 8 | FW | (Armenia) ARM | Artur Miranyan | 12 | 1 | 9+1 | 1 | 2 | 0 | 0 | 0 |
| 14 | DF | (Armenia) ARM | David Terteryan | 10 | 0 | 4+5 | 0 | 0+1 | 0 | 0 | 0 |
| 17 | FW | (Armenia) ARM | Vardan Pogosyan | 2 | 0 | 0 | 0 | 0 | 0 | 2 | 0 |
| 23 | MF | (Armenia) ARM | Hovhannes Harutyunyan | 2 | 0 | 0 | 0 | 0 | 0 | 2 | 0 |
| 23 | FW | (Brazil) BRA | Willian Araujo | 7 | 0 | 3+2 | 0 | 1+1 | 0 | 0 | 0 |
| 66 | MF | (Russia) RUS | Maksim Yermakov | 5 | 0 | 4 | 0 | 1 | 0 | 0 | 0 |

=== Goal scorers ===
| Place | Position | Nation | Number | Name | Premier League | Armenian Cup | Europa League | Total |
|---|---|---|---|---|---|---|---|---|
| 1 | MF | (Armenia) | 7 | Petros Avetisyan | 6 | 2 | 1 | 9 |
| 2 | MF | (Armenia) | 18 | Alik Arakelyan | 7 | 0 | 0 | 7 |
| 3 | FW | (Ivory Coast) | 20 | Drissa Diarrassouba | 5 | 0 | 0 | 5 |
| 4 | FW | (Armenia) | 9 | Robert Minasyan | 4 | 0 | 0 | 4 |
| 4 | MF | (Armenia) | 15 | Erik Vardanyan | 4 | 0 | 0 | 4 |
| 6 | DF | (Ivory Coast) | 33 | Didier Kadio | 2 | 0 | 0 | 2 |
| 7 | FW | (Armenia) | 8 | Artur Miranyan | 1 | 0 | 0 | 1 |
| 7 | MF | (Armenia) | 19 | Karlen Mkrtchyan | 1 | 0 | 0 | 1 |
| 7 | DF | (Armenia) | 16 | Robert Hakobyan | 1 | 0 | 0 | 1 |
| 7 | MF | (Russia) | 15 | Marat Burayev | 1 | 0 | 0 | 1 |
| 7 | MF | (Armenia) | 11 | Hovhannes Poghosyan | 1 | 0 | 0 | 1 |
| 7 | | | | Own goal | 1 | 0 | 0 | 1 |
| | | | | TOTALS | 34 | 2 | 1 | 37 |

=== Clean sheets ===
| Place | Position | Nation | Number | Name | Premier League | Armenian Cup | Europa League | Total |
|---|---|---|---|---|---|---|---|---|
| 1 | GK | (Armenia) | 12 | Gor Manukyan | 6 | 1 | 0 | 7 |
| 2 | GK | (Armenia) | 13 | Valeriy Voskonyan | 2 | 0 | 0 | 2 |
| | | | | TOTALS | 8 | 1 | 0 | 9 |

=== Disciplinary record ===
| Number | Nation | Position | Name | Premier League | | Armenian Cup | | UEFA Europa League | | Total | |
| Number | Nation | Position | Name | Yellow card | Red card | Yellow card | Red card | Yellow card | Red card | Yellow card | Red card |
| 2 | (Armenia) | DF | Serob Grigoryan | 5 | 0 | 1 | 0 | 0 | 0 | 6 | 0 |
| 3 | (Armenia) | DF | Artur Kartashyan | 8 | 0 | 0 | 0 | 0 | 0 | 8 | 0 |
| 4 | (Armenia) | DF | Aram Shakhnazaryan | 3 | 0 | 0 | 0 | 0 | 0 | 3 | 0 |
| 5 | (Armenia) | DF | Armen Manucharyan | 6 | 1 | 1 | 0 | 0 | 0 | 7 | 1 |
| 6 | (Armenia) | MF | Narek Aslanyan | 1 | 0 | 0 | 0 | 0 | 0 | 1 | 0 |
| 7 | (Armenia) | MF | Petros Avetisyan | 2 | 0 | 1 | 0 | 0 | 0 | 3 | 0 |
| 9 | (Armenia) | FW | Robert Minasyan | 2 | 0 | 0 | 0 | 0 | 0 | 2 | 0 |
| 10 | (Armenia) | MF | Erik Vardanyan | 4 | 0 | 1 | 0 | 0 | 0 | 5 | 0 |
| 13 | (Armenia) | GK | Valeriy Voskonyan | 2 | 0 | 0 | 0 | 0 | 0 | 2 | 0 |
| 16 | (Armenia) | DF | Robert Hakobyan | 3 | 0 | 0 | 0 | 0 | 0 | 3 | 0 |
| 17 | (Armenia) | FW | Hovhannes Ilangyozyan | 1 | 0 | 1 | 0 | 0 | 0 | 2 | 0 |
| 18 | (Armenia) | MF | Alik Arakelyan | 2 | 0 | 0 | 0 | 0 | 0 | 2 | 0 |
| 19 | (Armenia) | MF | Karlen Mkrtchyan | 3 | 0 | 0 | 0 | 0 | 0 | 3 | 0 |
| 24 | (Guinea-Bissau) | DF | Bacar Baldé | 2 | 0 | 0 | 0 | 0 | 0 | 2 | 0 |
| 26 | (Armenia) | MF | Artur Nadiryan | 1 | 0 | 0 | 0 | 0 | 0 | 1 | 0 |
| 30 | (Armenia) | MF | Vahagn Hayrapetyan | 3 | 0 | 0 | 0 | 0 | 0 | 3 | 0 |
| 33 | (Ivory Coast) | DF | Didier Kadio | 3 | 1 | 0 | 0 | 0 | 0 | 3 | 1 |
| 66 | (Nigeria) | MF | Marshal Johnson | 1 | 0 | 0 | 0 | 0 | 0 | 1 | 0 |
| | (Armenia) | MF | Samvel Spertsyan | 1 | 0 | 0 | 0 | 0 | 0 | 1 | 0 |
Players who left Pyunik during the season:
| 14 | (Armenia) | DF | David Terteryan | 0 | 0 | 1 | 0 | 0 | 0 | 1 | 0 |
| 66 | (Russia) | MF | Maksim Yermakov | 2 | 0 | 0 | 0 | 0 | 0 | 2 | 0 |
| | | | TOTALS | 56 | 2 | 6 | 0 | 0 | 0 | 62 | 2 |
