= Shustikov =

Shustikov (masculine, Russian: Шустиков) or Shustikova (feminine, Russian: Шустикова) is a Russian surname. Notable people with the surname include:

- Sergey Sergeyevich Shustikov (born 1989), Russian footballer
- Sergey Viktorovich Shustikov (born 1970), Russian footballer and coach
- Viktor Shustikov (1939–2025), Russian footballer and coach
