= Bacar Baldé =

Bissau-Guinean footballer (born 1992)

Personal information
- Full name: Bacar Baldé
- Date of birth: 15 January 1992 (age 34)
- Place of birth: Bissau, Guinea-Bissau
- Height: 1.78 m (5 ft 10 in)
- Position: Left back

Youth career
- 2009–2011: Porto

Senior career*
Years	Team	Apps	(Gls)
2011–2013	Paços Ferreira	6	(0)
2012	→ Arouca (loan)	11	(0)
2012–2013	→ Tondela (loan)	32	(1)
2013	Zawisza Bydgoszcz	0	(0)
2013–2014	Atlético	29	(0)
2014–2015	Beira-Mar	7	(0)
2015–2016	Vitória Guimarães	0	(0)
2015–2016	→ Vasco Gama (loan)	6	(0)
2016	Borac Čačak	3	(0)
2017	Mirandela	14	(1)
2017	Samtredia	14	(0)
2018	Pyunik	8	(0)
2018–2019	Gandzasar	19	(2)
2020–2021	Vianense	18	(0)
2021–2022	Ideal	8	(0)
2022	Oleiros	5	(0)

International career
2010–2019	Guinea-Bissau	20	(1)
- * Club domestic league appearances and goals

Bacar Baldé (born 15 January 1992) is a Bissau-Guinean former professional footballer who played mainly as a left back, but also as a left midfielder.

== Club career ==
Born in Bissau, Baldé moved to Portugal at the age of 17, and played two years with FC Porto's juniors. He made his debut as a senior with F.C. Paços de Ferreira in the Primeira Liga during the 2011–12 season, but was also loaned twice to clubs in the Segunda Liga.

Baldé signed with Poland's Zawisza Bydgoszcz in the summer of 2013. However, shortly after, and without having made a single official appearance, he returned to Portugal and joined Atlético Clube de Portugal also of the second division.

On 26 June 2014, Baldé returned to Portugal and its second tier with S.C. Beira-Mar. He signed for Vitória S.C. one year later, being immediately loaned to Vasco da Gama (South Africa).

In February 2016, Baldé arrived in Serbia along with Pedro Sass Petrazzi, but he only joined FK Borac Čačak officially in August after his former club dissolved. He made his debut in the Superliga late in that month, when he came on as a late substitute in a 1–0 away loss against OFK Bačka.

Baldé returned to Portugal subsequently, his spell in Serbia having been marred by financial problems. In June 2020, he signed with SC Vianense of the third division.

== International career ==
Baldé earned his first cap for Guinea-Bissau on 4 September 2010 at the age of 18, in a 1–0 home win over Kenya for the 2012 Africa Cup of Nations qualifiers.
