= Oleg Murachyov =

Russian footballer

Personal information
- Full name: Oleg Alekseyevich Murachyov
- Date of birth: 22 February 1995 (age 31)
- Place of birth: Selyatino, Moscow Oblast, Russia
- Height: 1.83 m (6 ft 0 in)
- Position: Centre back

Youth career
- –2009: DFA Rinata Dasayeva Moscow
- 2009–2010: Moscow
- 2010–2011: Spartak Moscow
- 2011: Lokomotiv Moscow

Senior career*
Years	Team	Apps	(Gls)
2011–2014	Lokomotiv Moscow	0	(0)
2014–2015	Torpedo Moscow	0	(0)
2015	Kvant Obninsk		
2015–2017	Spartak Nalchik	57	(2)
2017	Tyumen	13	(0)
2018	Volgar Astrakhan	5	(0)
2018–2019	Urozhay Krasnodar	24	(1)
2019–2020	Neman Grodno	17	(0)
2021–2022	Kyzylzhar	41	(0)

International career
2010	Russia U15	2	(0)
2010	Russia U16	9	(0)
2011	Russia U17	2	(0)
2014	Russia U19	1	(0)
- * Club domestic league appearances and goals

Oleg Alekseyevich Murachyov (Russian: Олег Алексеевич Мурачёв; born 22 February 1995) is a Russian former football player.

== Club career ==
He made his debut in the Russian Professional Football League for PFC Spartak Nalchik on 28 July 2015 in a game against FC Druzhba Maykop. He made his Russian Football National League debut for Spartak Nalchik on 11 July 2016 in a game against FC Kuban Krasnodar.
