= Petar Kunić =

Bosnian footballer (born 1993)

Personal information
- Date of birth: 15 July 1993 (age 33)
- Place of birth: Drvar, Bosnia and Herzegovina
- Height: 1.89 m (6 ft 2 in)
- Position: Forward

Team information
- Current team: Borac Banja Luka
- Number: 93

Youth career
- –2009: Borac Banja Luka

Senior career*
Years	Team	Apps	(Gls)
2009–2013	Borac Banja Luka	20	(6)
2013–2015	Dukla Prague	0	(0)
2013–2014	→ Borac Banja Luka (loan)	10	(2)
2014	→ Radnik Bijeljina (loan)	5	(0)
2015	→ Sloboda Mrkonjić Grad (loan)	8	(5)
2015–2016	Rudar Prijedor	25	(2)
2016–2017	Novi Pazar	5	(0)
2017–2018	Borac Banja Luka	44	(20)
2018–2019	Larissa	12	(0)
2019–2021	Zrinjski Mostar	23	(2)
2021	Atyrau	11	(1)
2021–2022	Napredak Kruševac	20	(2)
2022–2024	Radnik Surdulica	52	(5)
2024	Sloboda Tuzla	4	(0)
2025	Angri	14	(3)
2025–2026	Sloga Doboj	24	(2)
2026–	Borac Banja Luka	0	(0)

International career
2011–2012	Serbia U18	2	(2)
2012–2013	Serbia U19	4	(0)
2012–2013	Bosnia and Herzegovina U21	1	(0)
- * Club domestic league appearances and goals as of 12 June 2026

Petar Kunić (Serbian Cyrillic: Петар Кунић; born 15 July 1993) is a Bosnian professional footballer who plays for Bosnian Premier League club Borac Banja Luka.

== Club career ==
Born in Drvar, Bosnia and Herzegovina, Kunić started playing in the youth teams of Borac Banja Luka. He debuted for Borac senior squad in the 2009–10 Premier League of Bosnia and Herzegovina. He played with Borac at Bosnian premiership until summer 2013 when he signed with Czech First League side FK Dukla Prague. He stayed two years with Dukla however he failed to make a debut in the league and he spent most time on loan to other clubs, first season back with Borac, and the following one with Radnik Bijeljina, another Bosnian Serb club playing in the Bosnian Premier League, as also Sloboda Mrkonjić Grad in the First League of the Republika Srpska. It will be however a third Bosnian Serb side playing in Bosnian top-tier that will buy Kunić from Dukla in summer 2015, Rudar Prijedor. Kunić was a regular throughout the entire 2015–16 Premier League of Bosnia and Herzegovina season, however, due to bad results, and also the restructuring of the league which was having the number of participating clubs reduced from 16 to 12, Rudar Prijedor ended up relegated to the First League of the Republika Srpska. That situation made Rudar to become vulnerable in order to keep their crucial players, and Serbian top-flight side FK Novi Pazar took the chance to bring Kunić to their ranks in summer 2016. Kunić made his debut for Novi Pazar in the 2016–17 Serbian SuperLiga in the first-round game against Javor Ivanjica, when he entered as a substitute in the 69th minute of the game, which ended a 1–1 draw.

== International career ==
In 2013, Kunić played one game for the Bosnia and Herzegovina national U21 team in the 2015 UEFA Euro U21 qualifying game against Albania.

== Career statistics ==
As of match played 26 May 2026

Appearances and goals by club, season and competition
Club	Season	League			National cup (Note: Includes Bosnian Cup, Greek Cup, Serbian Cup)		Continental		Other		Total	
Club	Season	Division	Apps	Goals	Apps	Goals	Apps	Goals	Apps	Goals	Apps	Goals
Borac Banja Luka	2009–10	Bosnian Premier League	1	0	—		—		—		1	0
Borac Banja Luka	2011–12	Bosnian Premier League	9	4	—		—		—		9	4
Borac Banja Luka	2012–13	Bosnian Premier League	10	2	—		1 (Note: Appearance in UEFA Europa League)	0	—		11	2
Borac Banja Luka	Total		20	6	—		1	0	—		21	6
Borac Banja Luka (loan)	2013–14	Bosnian Premier League	10	2	—		—		—		10	2
Radnik Bijeljina (loan)	2014–15	Bosnian Premier League	5	0	1	1	—		—		6	1
Sloboda Mrkonjić Grad (loan)	2014–15	First League of RS	1	1	—		—		—		1	1
Rudar Prijedor	2015–16	Bosnian Premier League	25	2	—		—		—		25	2
Novi Pazar	2016–17	Serbian SuperLiga	5	0	—		—		—		5	0
Borac Banja Luka	2016–17	First League of RS	15	8	—		—		—		15	8
Borac Banja Luka	2017–18	Bosnian Premier League	29	12	2	3	—		—		31	15
Borac Banja Luka	Total		44	20	2	3	—		—		46	23
Larissa	2018–19	Super League Greece	12	0	1	0	—		—		13	0
Zrinjski Mostar	2019–20	Bosnian Premier League	14	2	3	1	—		—		17	3
Zrinjski Mostar	2020–21	Bosnian Premier League	9	0	2	2	—		—		11	2
Zrinjski Mostar	Total		23	2	5	3	—		—		28	5
Atyrau	2021	Kazakhstan Premier League	11	1	—		—		—		11	1
Napredak Kruševac	2021–22	Serbian SuperLiga	20	2	1	0	—		—		21	2
Radnik Surdulica	2022–23	Serbian SuperLiga	26	3	2	0	—		2 (Note: Appearances in the 2022–23 Serbian SuperLiga relegation play-offs)	0	30	3
Radnik Surdulica	2023–24	Serbian SuperLiga	26	2	1	0	—		—		27	2
Radnik Surdulica	Total		52	5	3	0	—		2	0	57	5
Sloboda Tuzla	2024–25	Bosnian Premier League	4	0	1	1	—		—		5	1
Angri	2024–25	Serie D	14	3	—		—		—		14	3
Sloga Doboj	2025–26	Bosnian Premier League	24	2	6	2	—		—		30	4
Borac Banja Luka	2026–27	Bosnian Premier League	0	0	0	0	—		—		0	0
Career total			270	46	20	10	1	0	2	0	293	56

== Honours ==
Borac Banja Luka

- Bosnian Premier League: 2010–11
- Bosnian Cup: 2009–10
