= Yegor Potapov =

Russian footballer

Personal information
- Full name: Yegor Nikolayevich Potapov
- Date of birth: 21 September 1993 (age 33)
- Place of birth: Saint Petersburg, Russia
- Height: 1.94 m (6 ft 4 in)
- Position: Defender

Team information
- Current team: SKA Rostov-on-Don

Youth career
- –2011: Zenit Saint Petersburg

Senior career*
| Years | Team | Apps | (Gls) |
| 2012–2013 | Rus Saint Petersburg | 10 | (1) |
| 2014 | Lokomotiv Jõhvi | 23 | (1) |
| 2015 | Klaipėdos Granitas | 32 | (1) |
| 2015 | Minija Kretinga | 2 | (0) |
| 2016 | Zvezda Saint Petersburg | | |
| 2017 | Dordoi Bishkek | | |
| 2018 | Smolevichi | 21 | (0) |
| 2019–2020 | Slavia Mozyr | 27 | (1) |
| 2021 | Kaisar | 23 | (1) |
| 2022–2023 | Maktaaral | 33 | (0) |
| 2024 | Torpedo Vladimir | 9 | (1) |
| 2024– | SKA Rostov-on-Don | | |
- * Club domestic league appearances and goals as of 7 July 2024

Yegor Nikolayevich Potapov (Russian: Егор Николаевич Потапов; born 21 September 1993) is a Russian professional footballer.
