= Soslan Takulov =

Russian footballer

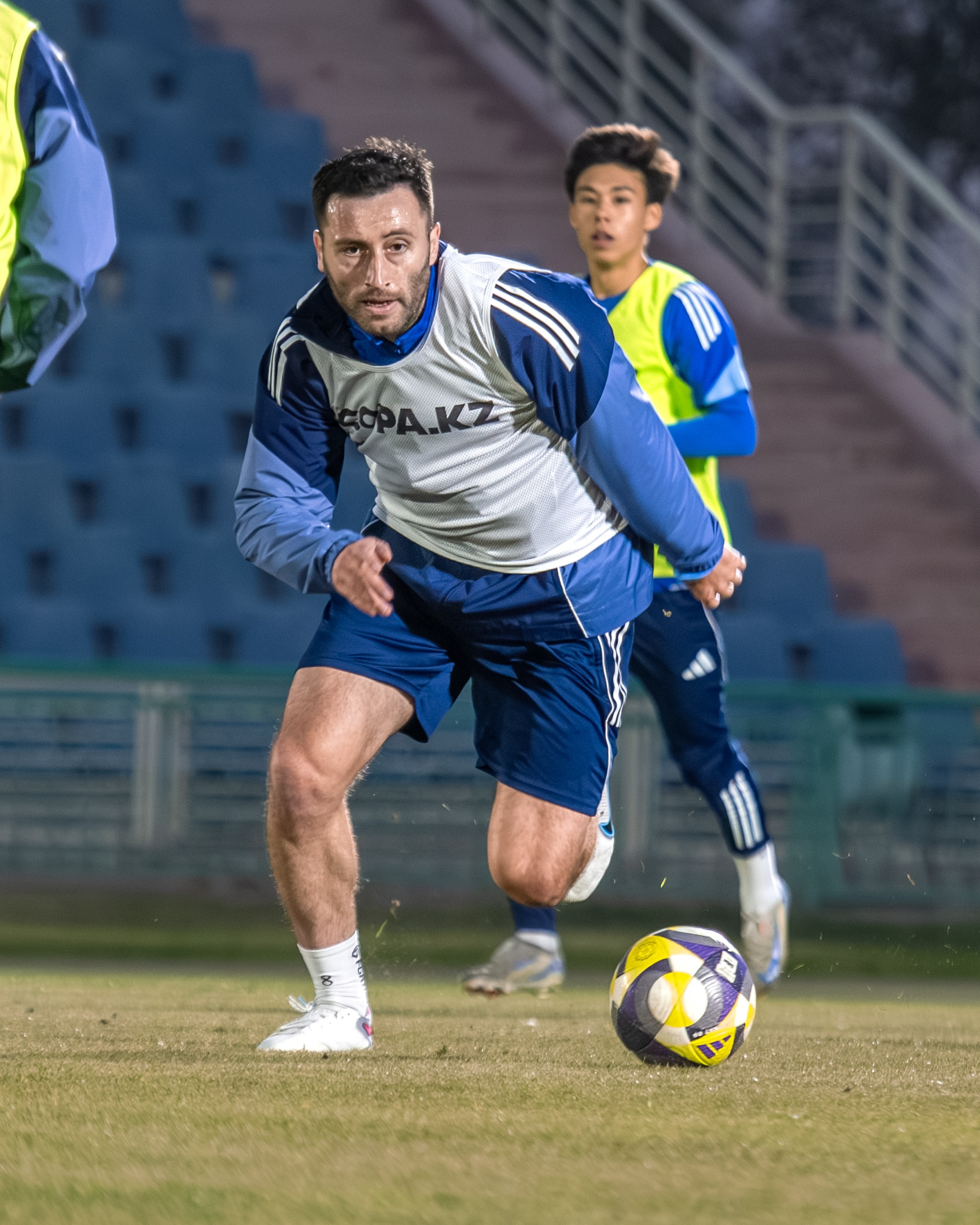

Personal information
- Full name: Soslan Ruslanovich Takulov
- Date of birth: 28 April 1995 (age 31)
- Place of birth: Vladikavkaz, Russia
- Height: 1.85 m (6 ft 1 in)
- Position: Centre back

Team information
- Current team: Atyrau
- Number: 8

Youth career
- Yunost Vladikavkaz

Senior career*
Years	Team	Apps	(Gls)
2015	FC Bars Vladikavkaz		
2015–2016	FC Berkut Armyansk	7	(0)
2016–2017	Sevastopol	16	(0)
2017	Dynamo Stavropol	6	(0)
2017	Ocean Kerch	7	(1)
2018	Saturn Ramenskoye	21	(2)
2019	Rustavi	15	(0)
2019–2020	Slutsk	25	(1)
2020	Shakhter Karagandy	16	(0)
2021	Akzhayik	16	(0)
2022–2024	Atyrau	66	(1)
2025–2026	Zhetysu	17	(1)
2026–	Atyrau	2	(0)
- * Club domestic league appearances and goals as of 2 July 2026

Soslan Ruslanovich Takulov (Russian: Сослан Русланович Такулов; born 28 April 1995) is a Russian football player who plays for Kazakhstan Premier League club Atyrau.

== Club career ==
He made his debut in the Russian Professional Football League for FC Dynamo Stavropol on 20 July 2017 in a game against FC Angusht Nazran.
