= Mykola Kovtalyuk =

Ukrainian footballer

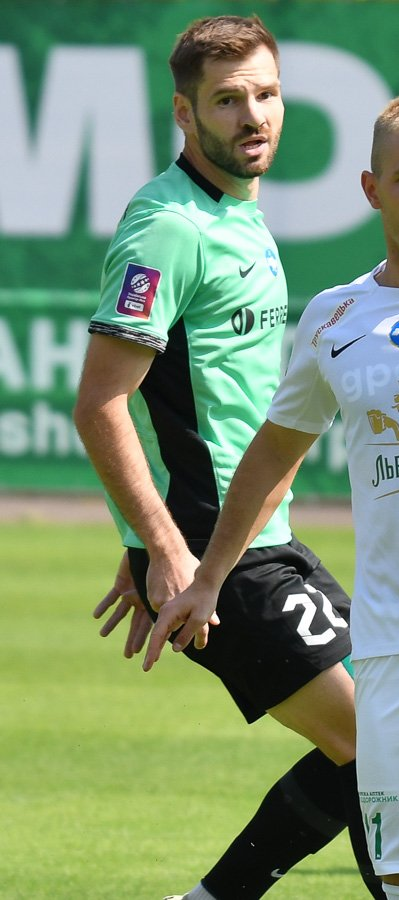

Personal information
- Full name: Mykola Andriyovych Kovtalyuk
- Date of birth: 26 April 1995 (age 31)
- Place of birth: Sambir, Ukraine
- Height: 1.91 m (6 ft 3 in)
- Position: Forward

Team information
- Current team: Botoșani
- Number: 22

Youth career
- 2008–2011: Knyazha Shchaslyve
- 2011–2012: UFK Lviv
- 2012–2013: Karpaty Lviv
- 2013–2014: Illichivets Mariupol

Senior career*
Years	Team	Apps	(Gls)
2014–2015	Poltava	3	(1)
2015	Zemplín Michalovce		
2015–2016	Arsenal Kyiv	17	(6)
2016–2017	Kolos Kovalivka	7	(0)
2017	→ Kolkheti Poti (loan)	16	(10)
2017	Dinamo Tbilisi	8	(0)
2018–2019	Dila Gori	31	(21)
2019	Anyang	11	(3)
2019–2021	Dila Gori	24	(13)
2021	Akzhayik	24	(6)
2022–2023	Shakhter Karagandy	10	(2)
2023–2024	Dila Gori	28	(10)
2024–2025	Vorskla Poltava	25	(4)
2025	Kolos Kovalivka	10	(1)
2025–	Botoșani	36	(6)
- * Club domestic league appearances and goals as of 23 October 2026

Mykola Andriyovych Kovtalyuk (Ukrainian: Мико́ла Андрі́йович Ковталю́к; born 26 April 1995) is a Ukrainian professional footballer who plays as a forward for Liga I club Botoșani.

== Career ==
Kovtalyuk is a product of the Knyazha Shchaslyve and UFK-Karpaty Lviv academies.

In 2018, he netted 21 goals for Georgian side Dila Gori, just one short of the best result shown in the league. Subsequently, Kovtalyuk was named in the symbolic team of the year.

In February 2019, Kovtalyuk moved to South Korea, signing with Anyang.

Seven months later he returned to Dila Gori on a deal until the end of 2020. Following the 2020 season, apart from becoming a top goalscorer of the league, he was named the best forward and foreign player of the season and included in Team of the Season again.

On 4 March 2021, he signed for FC Akzhayik.

In February 2023, his third spell with Dila began.

== Honours ==
Zemplín Michalovce

- 2. Liga: 2014–15

Vorskla Poltava

- Ukrainian Cup runner-up: 2023–24

Individual

- Erovnuli Liga top scorer: 2020
