= Yevgeny Yatsky =

Russian footballer

Personal information
- Full name: Yevgeny Vladimirovich Yatsky
- Date of birth: 26 March 1997 (age 29)
- Place of birth: Oktyabrsk, Russia
- Height: 1.84 m (6 ft 0 in)
- Position: Midfielder

Youth career
- FC Syzran-2003

Senior career*
Years	Team	Apps	(Gls)
2014–2018	FC Syzran-2003	61	(5)
2018–2019	FC Sokol Saratov	24	(3)
2019	FC Chayka Peschanokopskoye	0	(0)
2019–2020	FC Akron Tolyatti	18	(0)
2021	FC Akzhayik	15	(0)
2022	FC Volga Ulyanovsk	3	(0)
- * Club domestic league appearances and goals

Yevgeny Vladimirovich Yatsky (Russian: Евгений Владимирович Яцкий; born 26 March 1997) is a Russian former football player.

== Club career ==
He made his debut in the Russian Football National League for FC Akron Tolyatti on 12 August 2020 in a game against FC Torpedo Moscow.
