= Ștefan Sicaci =

Moldovan footballer

Ştefan Sicaci
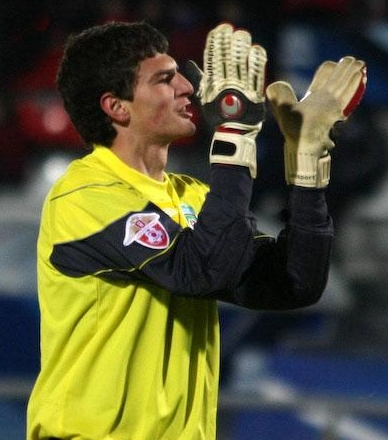
- Sicaci with Terek Grozny in 2008

Personal information
- Date of birth: 8 September 1988 (age 38)
- Place of birth: Tiraspol, Moldovan SSR
- Height: 1.94 m (6 ft 4 in)
- Position: Goalkeeper

Team information
- Current team: Zhetysu
- Number: 88

Youth career
- 2006–2007: Sheriff Tiraspol

Senior career*
| Years | Team | Apps | (Gls) |
| 2007–2008 | Sheriff Tiraspol | 0 | (0) |
| 2008–2012 | Terek Grozny | 1 | (0) |
| 2010 | → Volgar (loan) | 10 | (0) |
| 2012–2013 | Salyut Belgorod | 6 | (0) |
| 2013–2016 | Volgar | 44 | (0) |
| 2016–2017 | Torpedo Moscow | 10 | (0) |
| 2017 | Kolkheti Poti | 12 | (0) |
| 2017–2018 | Afips Afipsky | 29 | (0) |
| 2018–2019 | Dinamo Tbilisi | 20 | (0) |
| 2020 | Samtredia | 2 | (0) |
| 2021–2022 | Akzhayik | 19 | (0) |
| 2023–2024 | Kaisar | 50 | (0) |
| 2025 | Dinamo Tbilisi | 9 | (0) |
| 2026– | Zhetysu | 23 | (0) |

International career
| 2008–2009 | Moldova U21 | 7 | (0) |
- * Club domestic league appearances and goals as of 1 November 2026

Ştefan Sicaci (Russian: Степан Васильевич Сикач, Stepan Vasilyevich Sikach, born 8 September 1988) is a Moldovan professional footballer who plays as a goalkeeper for Kazakhstan Premier League club Zhetysu.

== Career ==
On 29 December 2022. Kaisar announced the signing of Sicaci.

On 16 January 2025, Dinamo Tbilisi announced the signing of Sicaci to a one-year contract. On 11 January 2026, Dinamo announced that Sicaci had the club after his contract had expired.

On 11 January 2026, Kazakhstan Premier League club Zhetysu announced the signing of Sicaci.
