= Pavel Nazarenko =

Belarusian footballer

Personal information
- Date of birth: 20 January 1995 (age 31)
- Place of birth: Minsk, Belarus
- Height: 1.75 m (5 ft 9 in)
- Position: Right back

Team information
- Current team: Vitebsk
- Number: 91

Youth career
- 2011–2013: Dinamo Minsk

Senior career*
| Years | Team | Apps | (Gls) |
| 2013–2018 | Dinamo Minsk | 2 | (0) |
| 2014 | → Bereza-2010 (loan) | 25 | (1) |
| 2015 | → Belshina Bobruisk (loan) | 9 | (0) |
| 2015 | → Bereza-2010 (loan) | 15 | (2) |
| 2016 | → Dinamo Brest (loan) | 26 | (1) |
| 2017–2018 | → Gorodeya (loan) | 42 | (1) |
| 2019 | Slutsk | 25 | (1) |
| 2020 | Vitebsk | 28 | (1) |
| 2021 | Akzhayik | 13 | (1) |
| 2021–2022 | Shakhter Karagandy | 7 | (0) |
| 2022 | Akzhayik | 12 | (0) |
| 2023 | Zhetysu | 21 | (0) |
| 2024 | Gomel | 12 | (1) |
| 2024 | Istiklol | 0 | (0) |
| 2025 | Minsk | 12 | (0) |
| 2026– | Vitebsk | 6 | (0) |

International career
| 2011–2012 | Belarus U17 | 6 | (0) |
| 2013 | Belarus U19 | 3 | (0) |
| 2014–2016 | Belarus U21 | 11 | (1) |
- * Club domestic league appearances and goals as of 3 July 2026

Pavel Nazarenko (Belarusian: Павел Назарэнка; Russian: Павел Назаренко; born 20 January 1995) is a Belarusian professional footballer who plays for Belarusian Premier League club Vitebsk.

== Career ==
=== Club ===
On 18 June 2022, Nazarenko left Shakhter Karagandy.

On 12 July 2024, Tajikistan Higher League club Istiklol announced the signing of Nazarenko on a contract until the end of the season.

== Honours ==
Dinamo Brest

- Belarusian Cup winner: 2016–17
