= Dmitri Michurenkov =

Russian footballer

Personal information
- Full name: Dmitri Alekseyevich Michurenkov
- Date of birth: 19 May 1995 (age 31)
- Place of birth: Stavropol, Russia
- Height: 1.86 m (6 ft 1 in)
- Position: Forward

Senior career*
Years	Team	Apps	(Gls)
2012–2013	Gazprom transgaz Stavropol Ryzdvyany	21	(2)
2013	→ Rubin Kazan (loan)	0	(0)
2014	Rotor Volgograd	0	(0)
2014–2015	Fakel Voronezh	16	(0)
2015	Avangard Kursk	15	(1)
2016–2018	Fakel Voronezh	39	(6)
2018–2019	Armavir	28	(3)
2019–2020	Neftekhimik Nizhnekamsk	20	(3)
2020	Nizhny Novgorod	12	(0)
2021	Akzhayik	17	(2)
2021–2022	SKA Rostov-on-Don	26	(6)
2023	Rotor Volgograd	11	(0)
2023	Leon Saturn Ramenskoye	14	(4)
2024	Kompozit Pavlovsky Posad	10	(0)
2024	Dynamo Stavropol	12	(2)
- * Club domestic league appearances and goals as of 16 November 2024

Dmitri Alekseyevich Michurenkov (Russian: Дмитрий Алексеевич Мичуренков; born 19 May 1995) is a Russian football forward.

== Club career ==
He made his debut in the Russian Second Division for Kavkaztransgaz-2005 Ryzdvyany on 9 September 2012 in a game against Mashuk-KMV Pyatigorsk.

=== Rubin Kazan ===
On 14 August 2013, it was announced that he had joined Rubin Kazan on a 6-month loan, with an option to purchase at the end.

He made his debut for the reserve team in a 1–1 draw vs Ural Yekaterinburg's reserve team on 31 August 2013, coming on as a substitute. He made no appearances for the senior squad during his loan.

=== Fakel Voronezh ===
He made his Russian Football National League debut for Fakel Voronezh on 12 March 2016 in a game against Tyumen.
