= Sergey Shustikov (footballer, born 1989) =

Russian footballer

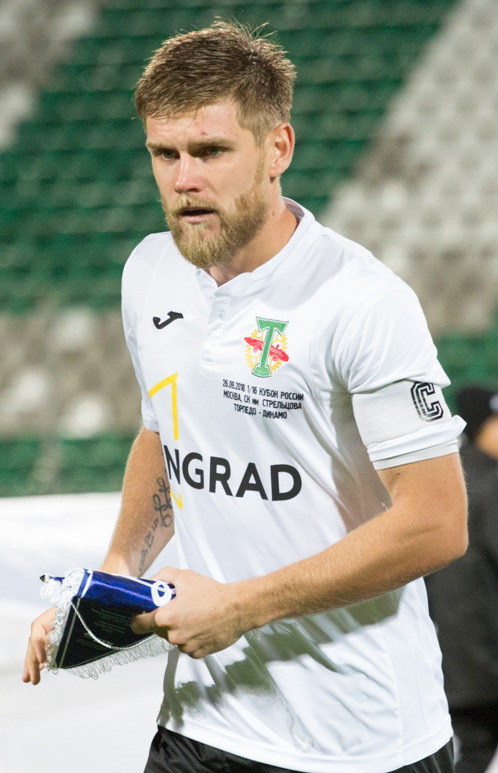
- Shustikov with Torpedo Moscow in 2018

Personal information
- Full name: Sergey Sergeyevich Shustikov
- Date of birth: 5 March 1989 (age 37)
- Place of birth: Moscow, Russian SFSR
- Height: 1.87 m (6 ft 2 in)
- Position: Defender

Team information
- Current team: Academy Torpedo Moscow (scout)

Youth career
- –2007: FC Moscow

Senior career*
Years	Team	Apps	(Gls)
2008–2009	Krylia Sovetov Samara	1	(0)
2010	Rostov	0	(0)
2011	→ Volga Ulyanovsk (loan)	9	(0)
2012	Khimik Dzerzhinsk	9	(0)
2012	Lokomotiv-2 Moscow	16	(0)
2013–2015	Khimik Dzerzhinsk	61	(0)
2015–2020	Torpedo Moscow	93	(5)
2021–2022	FC Akzhayik	49	(1)
2023	FC Uralets Moscow (amateur)		
2023	FC Titan Moscow (amateur)		

International career
2009	Russia U-21	1	(0)

Managerial career
- 2023: FC Torpedo Moscow (fan relations specialist)
- 2024–: Academy Torpedo Moscow (scout)
- * Club domestic league appearances and goals

Sergey Sergeyevich Shustikov (Russian: Серге́й Серге́евич Шустиков; born 5 March 1989) is a Russian former footballer who played as a defender.

== Club career ==
Shustikov made his Russian Premier League debut for Krylia Sovetov Samara on 20 September 2008 in a game against Amkar Perm.

== Personal life ==
He is a member of Torpedo Moscow dynasty, both his grandfather Viktor and his father Sergey Sr. played for Torpedo for many years.
