= Marat Burayev =

Russian football player

Personal information
- Full name: Marat Nikolayevich Burayev
- Date of birth: 22 October 1995 (age 31)
- Place of birth: Vladikavkaz, Russia
- Height: 1.65 m (5 ft 5 in)
- Position: Midfielder

Youth career
- –2012: Yunost Vladikavkaz
- 2013–2014: Krasnodar

Senior career*
Years	Team	Apps	(Gls)
2015	FC Stroitel Russkoye		
2015–2016	FC Berkut Armyansk	11	(2)
2016	Kafa Feodosia	13	(1)
2017	Sevastopol	9	(0)
2017	Spartak Vladikavkaz	14	(1)
2017–2018	Pyunik	9	(1)
2018	Artsakh	7	(1)
2019	Krymteplytsia Molodizhne	11	(0)
2019–2020	Slutsk	27	(3)
2021	Akzhayik	4	(0)
2021	Slutsk	9	(1)
2022	Metallurg Vidnoye	10	(4)
2022	Zhetysu	12	(3)
2023	Kimmeri Vladikavkaz (amateur)		
- * Club domestic league appearances and goals as of 31 December 2022

Marat Nikolayevich Burayev (Russian: Марат Николаевич Бураев; born 22 October 1995) is a Russian former football player.

== Club career ==
He made his debut in the Russian Professional Football League for FC Spartak Vladikavkaz on 20 July 2017 in a game against FC Chayka Peschanokopskoye.

In November 2018, Burayev left Artsakh FC.
