= 2021 FC Shakhter Karagandy season =

FC Shakhter Karagandy
2021 season
- Chairman: Sergei Yegorov
- Manager: Ali Aliyev (until 10 April); Andrei Finonchenko (Caretaker) (10-16 April); Magomed Adiyev (from 16 April)
- Stadium: Shakhter Stadium
- Premier League: 6th
- Kazakhstan Cup: Runners Up
- Super Cup: Fourth
- Europa Conference League: Playoff Round vs Maccabi Tel Aviv
- Top goalscorer: League: Aydos Tattybaev (4); All: Aydos Tattybaev (16wa
- Highest home attendance: 4,000 vs Kyzylzhar (12 June 2021)
- Lowest home attendance: 0 vs Ordabasy (20 March 2021) 0 vs Akzhayik (14 April 2021); 0 vs Astana (23 April 2021); 0 vs Kaisar (3 May 2021); 0 vs Turan (14 May 2021); 0 vs Aktobe (27 June 2021); 0 vs Kyzylzhar (16 July 2021); 0 vs SDYuShOR 8 (25 July 2021); 0 vs FCSB (29 July 2021); 0 vs Kolos Kovalivka (10 August 2021); 0 vs Ordabasy (14 August 2021); 0 vs Maccabi Tel Aviv (19 August 2021) 0 vs Zhetysu (12 September 2021)
- Average home league attendance: 776 (6 November 2021)
Home colours	Away colours	Third colours

The 2021 FC Shakhter Karagandy season was the 31st successive season that the club played in the Kazakhstan Premier League, the highest tier of association football in Kazakhstan. Shakhter Karagandy finished the season in sixth position. where runners up in the Kazakhstan Cup and were knocked out of the Europa Conference League by Maccabi Tel Aviv at the Play Off stage.

== Season events ==
On 20 January, Shakhter Karagandy announced Ali Aliyev as their new manager.

On 28 January, Shakhter Karagandy announced the return of goalkeeper Igor Shatskiy from Tobol, and defender Mikhail Gabyshev from Caspiy.

On 4 February, Ivan Graf joined Shakhter Karagandy from Kaisar, with Vuk Mitošević joining from Radnik Surdulica on 14 February.

On 22 February, Ararat Yerevan announced that midfielder Solomon Udo had left the club to join Shakhter Karagandy.

On 25 February, Shakhter Karagandy announced the signing of Yevhen Pavlov, and Joseph Adah.

On 28 February, Shakhter Karagandy announced the signings of Yeskendir Kybyray from Zhetysu and Karam Sultanov from Sumgayit.

On 2 March, Shakhter Karagandy announced the signing of Vitaliy Balashov.

On 15 March, Shakhter Karagandy announced the signing of David Atanaskoski.

On 10 April, after suffering 5 defeats in 6 games, head coach Ali Aliyev resigned from his position, with Andrei Finonchenko being appointed as Caretaker. The following day, 11 April, Shakhter Karagandy announced the signing of Ziguy Badibanga, who'd previously played for Ordabasy during the 2020 season.

On 16 April, Shakhter Karagandy announced Magomed Adiyev as their new head coach.

On 7 May, Shakhter Karagandy announced the signing of Alan Chochiyev and Martin Toshev.

On 13 May, Shakhter Karagandy announced the signing of Yevgeny Gapon from Khimki.

On 22 May, Shakhter Karagandy announced that Yevhen Pavlov had left the club by mutual consent.

On 6 June, Shakhter Karagandy announced that Vitaliy Balashov had left the club by mutual consent.

On 4 July, Shakhter Karagandy announced the signing of Edin Rustemović, with Oralkhan Omirtayev returning to the club the following day.

On 9 July, Shakhter Karagandy announced the signings of Igor Trofimets from Ordabasy, and Pavel Nazarenko from Akzhayik.

On 14 July, Shakhter Karagandy announced the signing of David Mawutor on a free transfer after he'd left Wisła Kraków.

On 15 July, Shakhter Karagandy announced the return of Abdel Lamanje from Astra Giurgiu.

On 17 July, Shakhter Karagandy announced the signing of Yevgeniy Shikavka from Dinamo Minsk, with Vladimir Khozin signing from Chayka Peschanokopskoye the following day.

On 31 July, Shakhter Karagandy announced the signing of Idris Umayev on loan from Akhmat Grozny.

== Squad ==
As of match played 28 November 2021

No.	Name	Nationality	Position	Date of birth (age)	Signed from	Signed in	Contract ends	Apps.	Goals
Goalkeepers
1	Igor Trofimets	(Kazakhstan)	GK	20 August 1996 (age 30)	Ordabasy	2021		5	0
30	Igor Shatskiy	(Kazakhstan)	GK	11 May 1989 (age 37)	Tobol	2021		147	0
46	Roman Klyushnev	(Kazakhstan)	GK	5 May 2000 (age 26)	Academy	2021		1	0
95	Danila Karpikov	(Kazakhstan)	GK	15 October 2003 (age 22)	Academy	2021		0	0
	Artem Pryadkin	(Kyrgyzstan)	GK	18 September 2001 (age 25)	Ilbirs Bishkek	2021		0	0
Defenders
3	David Atanaskoski	(North Macedonia)	DF	21 October 1996 (age 29)	Makedonija Gjorče Petrov	2021		31	3
5	Mikhail Gabyshev	(Kazakhstan)	DF	2 January 1990 (age 36)	Caspiy	2021		156	9
13	Pavel Nazarenko	(Belarus)	DF	20 January 1995 (age 31)	Akzhayik	2021		11	1
16	Yeskendir Kybyray	(Kazakhstan)	DF	14 August 1997 (age 29)	Zhetysu	2021		36	1
25	Andrey Buyvolov	(Russia)	DF	12 January 1987 (age 39)	Yenisey Krasnoyarsk	2020	2021	44	2
27	Vladimir Khozin	(Russia)	DF	3 July 1989 (age 37)	Chayka Peschanokopskoye	2021		16	0
33	Abdel Lamanje	(Cameroon)	DF	27 July 1990 (age 36)	Astra Giurgiu	2021		31	2
48	Timofey Tronza	(Kazakhstan)	DF	15 May 2002 (age 24)	Academy	2021		1	0
50	Tair Nurseitov	(Kazakhstan)	DF	11 July 2000 (age 26)	Bolat	2018		22	0
51	Amir Tleubaev	(Kazakhstan)	DF	7 December 2003 (age 22)	Academy	2021		1	0
52	Konstantin Gorizanov	(Kazakhstan)	DF	30 September 2002 (age 24)	Academy	2021		1	0
53	Adil Akhanov	(Kazakhstan)	DF	31 May 1999 (age 27)	Academy	2021		1	0
55	Ivan Graf	(Croatia)	DF	17 June 1987 (age 39)	Kaisar	2021		25	0
57	Egor Alishauskas	(Kazakhstan)	DF	18 December 1997 (age 28)	Bolat	2020		11	0
62	Dzhokhangir Abilmazhinov	(Kazakhstan)	DF	6 October 2000 (age 25)	Academy	2021		1	0
66	Bogdan Savkiv	(Kazakhstan)	DF	28 August 2001 (age 25)	Academy	2021		1	0
67	Aleksandr Bezrodniy	(Kazakhstan)	DF	12 June 2002 (age 24)	Academy	2021		1	0
Midfielders
7	Gevorg Najaryan	(Kazakhstan)	MF	6 January 1998 (age 28)	Astana	2018	2021	116	4
8	Stefan Bukorac	(Serbia)	MF	15 February 1991 (age 35)	loan from Caspiy	2021	2021	13	0
11	Alan Chochiyev	(Russia)	MF	7 September 1991 (age 35)	Chayka Peschanokopskoye	2021		20	1
15	David Mawutor	(Ghana)	MF	12 April 1992 (age 34)	Wisła Kraków	2021		15	2
17	Pavel Kriventsev	(Kazakhstan)	MF	2 October 1993 (age 32)	Kyzylzhar	2020		31	0
23	Ruslan Tutkyshev	(Kazakhstan)	MF	18 February 1999 (age 27)	Youth Team	2020		1	1
29	Vuk Mitošević	(Serbia)	MF	12 February 1991 (age 35)	Radnik Surdulica	2021		28	0
31	Aidos Oral	(Kazakhstan)	MF	5 April 1999 (age 27)	Academy	2021		1	0
34	Abylaikhan Nazimkhanov	(Kazakhstan)	MF	5 February 2002 (age 24)	Academy	2021		14	1
37	Shyngys Flyuk	(Kazakhstan)	MF	28 December 2001 (age 24)	Academy	2021		1	0
41	Almas Tyulyubay	(Kazakhstan)	MF	18 April 2001 (age 25)	Academy	2021		1	0
43	Ualikhan Mukhametzhanov	(Kazakhstan)	MF	31 October 2001 (age 24)	Academy	2021		1	0
44	Edin Rustemović	(Bosnia and Herzegovina)	MF	6 January 1993 (age 33)	Tuzla City	2021		18	0
49	Alshin Bayzakhov	(Kazakhstan)	MF	17 May 1999 (age 27)	Academy	2021		2	0
64	Rudolf Wagner	(Kazakhstan)	MF	13 June 2001 (age 25)	Academy	2021		1	0
76	Almat Nurgazy	(Kazakhstan)	MF	14 February 2002 (age 24)	Academy	2021		1	0
79	Ansar Altynkhan	(Kazakhstan)	MF	8 November 2003 (age 22)	Academy	2021		1	0
82	Aleksandr Vasyunkin	(Kazakhstan)	MF	9 April 2003 (age 23)	Academy	2021		1	0
83	Kirill Lavrenyuk	(Kazakhstan)	MF	9 August 2003 (age 23)	Academy	2021		1	0
87	Mikhail Bakayev	(Russia)	MF	5 August 1987 (age 39)	Shinnik Yaroslavl	2020		37	0
88	Arsen Khubulov	(Russia)	MF	13 December 1990 (age 35)	Yenisey Krasnoyarsk	2020	2021	33	7
Forwards
9	Aydos Tattybaev	(Kazakhstan)	FW	26 April 1990 (age 36)	Caspiy	2020		55	20
10	Idris Umayev	(Russia)	FW	15 January 1999 (age 27)	loan from Akhmat Grozny	2021		15	6
19	Oralkhan Omirtayev	(Kazakhstan)	FW	16 July 1998 (age 28)	Tobol	2021		91	12
22	Ivan Sviridov	(Kazakhstan)	FW	28 June 2002 (age 24)	Youth Team	2020		10	1
24	Aramis Kouzine	(Canada)	FW	3 October 1998 (age 27)	Unattached	2021		1	0
42	Andrey Giorgiadi	(Kazakhstan)	FW	21 June 2003 (age 23)	Academy	2021		1	1
54	Maxim Galkin	(Kazakhstan)	FW	12 July 1999 (age 27)	Youth Team	2020		7	0
56	Kirill Novikov	(Kazakhstan)	FW	9 April 2002 (age 24)	Academy	2021		1	0
80	Georgiy Zakharenko	(Kazakhstan)	FW	12 January 1998 (age 28)	Academy	2021		1	0
89	Martin Toshev	(Bulgaria)	FW	17 April 1990 (age 36)	Academica Clinceni	2021		17	3
96	Damir Bitusupov	(Kazakhstan)	FW	21 March 2000 (age 26)	Academy	2021		1	0
98	Timur Mukhametzhanov	(Kazakhstan)	FW	8 April 2003 (age 23)	Academy	2021		1	0
99	Yevgeniy Shikavka	(Belarus)	FW	15 October 1992 (age 33)	Dinamo Minsk	2021		15	2
Unregistered
23	Birzhan Kulbekov	(Kazakhstan)	DF	18 December 1997 (age 28)	Bolat	2020		0	0
19	Matvey Gerasimov	(Kazakhstan)	FW	4 February 2001 (age 25)	Youth Team	2020		0	0
Away on loan
18	Solomon Udo	(Armenia)	MF	15 July 1995 (age 31)	Ararat Yerevan	2021		19	0
70	Jean-Ali Payruz	(Kazakhstan)	MF	12 August 1999 (age 27)	Youth Team	2019		56	6
Left during the season
4	Gideon Baah	(Ghana)	DF	1 October 1991 (age 35)	Honka	2020	2021	25	2
10	Vitaliy Balashov	(Ukraine)	FW	15 January 1991 (age 35)	Unattached	2021		15	2
33	Yevgeny Gapon	(Russia)	DF	20 April 1991 (age 35)	Khimki	2021		11	0
35	Ernar Saylauov	(Kazakhstan)	GK	30 March 2000 (age 26)	Academy	2021		0	0
39	Ziguy Badibanga	(Belgium)	MF	26 November 1991 (age 34)	Ordabasy	2021		6	0
44	Karam Sultanov	(Kazakhstan)	DF	15 April 1996 (age 30)	Sumgayit	2021		13	0
78	Timurbek Zakirov	(Kazakhstan)	GK	1 March 1996 (age 30)	Kyzylzhar	2020	2021	20	0
91	Yevhen Pavlov	(Ukraine)	FW	12 March 1991 (age 35)	Radnik Surdulica	2021		9	0
99	Joseph Adah	(Nigeria)	FW	6 December 1997 (age 28)	Gandzasar Kapan	2021		1	0

=== On loan ===
Note: Flags indicate national team as defined under FIFA eligibility rules; some limited exceptions apply. Players may hold more than one non-FIFA nationality.

No.	Pos.	Nation	Player
18	MF	ARM	Solomon Udo (at Atyrau)
70	MF	KAZ	Zhan-Ali Payruz (at Caspiy)

== Transfers ==
=== In ===
Date	Position	Nationality	Name	From	Fee	Ref.
28 January 2021	GK	(Kazakhstan)	Igor Shatskiy	Tobol	Undisclosed	
28 January 2021	DF	(Kazakhstan)	Mikhail Gabyshev	Caspiy	Undisclosed	
4 February 2021	DF	(Croatia)	Ivan Graf	Kaisar	Undisclosed	
14 February 2021	MF	(Serbia)	Vuk Mitošević	Radnik Surdulica	Undisclosed	
14 February 2021	MF	(Armenia)	Solomon Udo	Ararat Yerevan	Undisclosed	
25 February 2021	MF	(Nigeria)	Joseph Adah	Gandzasar Kapan	Free	
25 February 2021	FW	(Ukraine)	Yevhen Pavlov	Radnik Surdulica	Undisclosed	
28 February 2021	DF	(Kazakhstan)	Yeskendir Kybyray	Zhetysu	Undisclosed	
28 February 2021	DF	(Kazakhstan)	Karam Sultanov	Sumgayit	Undisclosed	
2 March 2021	FW	(Ukraine)	Vitaliy Balashov	Unattached	Free	
15 March 2021	DF	(North Macedonia)	David Atanaskoski	Unattached	Free	
11 April 2021	MF	(Belgium)	Ziguy Badibanga	Ordabasy	Free	
7 May 2021	MF	(Russia)	Alan Chochiyev	Chayka Peschanokopskoye	Free	
7 May 2021	FW	(Bulgaria)	Martin Toshev	Academica Clinceni	Undisclosed	
13 May 2021	DF	(Russia)	Yevgeny Gapon	Khimki	Undisclosed	
4 July 2021	MF	(Bosnia and Herzegovina)	Edin Rustemović	Tuzla City	Undisclosed	
5 July 2021	FW	(Kazakhstan)	Oralkhan Omirtayev	Tobol	Free	
9 July 2021	GK	(Kazakhstan)	Igor Trofimets	Ordabasy	Undisclosed	
9 July 2021	DF	(Belarus)	Pavel Nazarenko	Akzhayik	Undisclosed	
14 July 2021	MF	(Ghana)	David Mawutor	Wisła Kraków	Free	
15 July 2021	DF	(Cameroon)	Abdel Lamanje	Astra Giurgiu	Undisclosed	
17 July 2021	FW	(Belarus)	Yevgeniy Shikavka	Dinamo Minsk	Undisclosed	
18 July 2021	DF	(Russia)	Vladimir Khozin	Chayka Peschanokopskoye	Undisclosed	
29 July 2021	FW	(Canada)	Aramis Kouzine	Unattached	Free	
31 July 2021	GK	(Kyrgyzstan)	Artem Pryadkin	Ilbirs Bishkek	Undisclosed	

=== Loans in ===
Date from	Position	Nationality	Name	From	Date to	Ref.
15 July 2021	MF	(Serbia)	Stefan Bukorac	Caspiy	End of season	
31 July 2021	FW	(Russia)	Idris Umayev	Akhmat Grozny	End of season	

=== Loans out ===
Date from	Position	Nationality	Name	To	Date to	Ref.
30 July 2021	MF	(Armenia)	Solomon Udo	Atyrau	End of season	
2 August 2021	MF	(Kazakhstan)	Jean-Ali Payruz	Caspiy	End of season	

=== Released ===
Date	Position	Nationality	Name	Joined	Date	Ref.
22 May 2021	FW	(Ukraine)	Yevhen Pavlov	Radnički Niš		
6 June 2021	FW	(Ukraine)	Vitaliy Balashov	Aktobe	27 August 2021	
30 June 2021	GK	(Kazakhstan)	Ernar Sailauov			
30 June 2021	DF	(Kazakhstan)	Karam Sultanov	Ordabasy	28 July 2021	
30 June 2021	FW	(Nigeria)	Joseph Adah	Olimp-Dolgoprudny		
4 July 2021	GK	(Kazakhstan)	Timurbek Zakirov	Ordabasy		
4 July 2021	DF	(Russia)	Yevgeny Gapon	Kuban Krasnodar		
16 July 2021	DF	(Ghana)	Gideon Baah			
16 July 2021	MF	(Belgium)	Ziguy Badibanga	AEL		

== Friendlies ==
12 February 2021	Shakhter Karagandy (Kazakhstan)	–	(Russia) Krylia Sovetov	Belek, Turkey
(UTC+6)		Report

15 February 2021	Shakhter Karagandy (Kazakhstan)	0 – 1	(Russia) Akhmat Grozny	Belek, Turkey
(UTC+6)		Report

22 February 2021	Shakhter Karagandy (Kazakhstan)	0 – 1	(Russia) Shinnik Yaroslavl	Belek, Turkey
(UTC+6)		Report	Goal

22 February 2021	Shakhter Karagandy (Kazakhstan)	5 – 0	(Russia) Kazanka Moscow	Belek, Turkey
(UTC+6)	M.Galkin; Baah; Y.Kybyrai; P.Kryventsev	Report

== Competitions ==
=== Overview ===
Competition	First match	Last match	Starting round	Final position	Record							
Competition	First match	Last match	Starting round	Final position	Pld	W	D	L	GF	GA	GD	Win %
Premier League	14 March 2021	30 October 2021	Matchday 1	6th	26	9	6	11	25	34	−9	34.62
Kazakhstan Cup	11 July 2021	28 November 2021	Group Stages	Runners Up	11	6	2	3	31	20	+11	54.55
Super Cup	2 March 2021	5 March 2021	Semifinal	Fourth	2	0	0	2	1	4	−3	0.00
Europa Conference League	23 July 2021	26 August 2021	Second Qualifying Round	Playoff Round	6	1	2	3	3	6	−3	16.67
Total					45	16	10	19	60	64	−4	35.56

Last updated: 28 November 2021
Source: Competitions

=== Super Cup ===
2 March 2021 Semifinal	Shakhter Karagandy	0 – 2	Astana	Turkistan
15:00 (UTC+6)	Graf (yellow card) 40'; Udo (yellow card) 75'	Report	Tomašević 17'; Barseghyan 74'; Šimunović (yellow card) 78'	Stadium: Turkistan Arena; Attendance: 0 Referee: Grigory Moskovchenko

5 March 2021 Third Place	Kairat	2 – 1	Shakhter Karagandy	Turkistan
15:00 (UTC+6)	Ustimenko (yellow card) 51'; Palyakow 64'; Mamba 88'; S.Keyler (yellow card) 90+3'	Report	J-A.Payruz (yellow card) 26' (goal) 52'; Y.Kybyray (yellow card) 61'; M.Gabyshev (yellow card) 90+3'	Stadium: Turkistan Arena; Attendance: 1,500; Referee: Furkat Atazhanov

=== Premier League ===
==== Results summary ====
Overall								Home						Away					
Pld	W	D	L	GF	GA	GD	Pts	W	D	L	GF	GA	GD	W	D	L	GF	GA	GD
26	9	6	11	25	34	−9	33	5	2	6	12	14	−2	4	4	5	13	20	−7

Last updated: 30 October 2021.
Source: See Results

==== Results by round ====
Round	1	2	3	4	5	6	7	8	9	10	11	12	13	14	15	16	17	18	19	20	21	22	23	24	25	26
Ground	A	H	A	A	A	A	H	A	H	A	H	A	H	A	H	H	A	H	A	H	A	H	A	H	A	H
Result	W	L	L	L	L	W	L	W	D	D	L	L	L	D	L	W	D	W	L	W	W	D	D	W	L	W
Position	7	11	13	13	14	11	12	11	11	12	12	12	12	13	13	12	12	12	12	11	10	9	9	8	8	6

Source: See Results
A = Away; H = Home; W = Win; D = Draw; L = Loss

==== Results ====
13 March 2021 1	Atyrau	0 – 1	Shakhter Karagandy	Atyrau
16:00 (UTC+6)	E.Amanzhol (yellow card) 4'; R.Dzhumatov (yellow card) 16'; Loginovsky (yellow card) 25'; Gian (yellow card) 38'	Report	Balashov 14'; Pavlov (yellow card) 68'	Stadium: Munaishy Stadium; Attendance: 0 Referee: Arman Ismuratov
Note: Match played behind closed doors due to the COVID-19 pandemic in Kazakhstan.

20 March 2021 2	Shakhter Karagandy	0 – 2	Ordabasy	Nur-Sultan
16:00 (UTC+6)	Baah (yellow card) 14'; Udo (yellow card) 19'; Pavlov (yellow card) 26'; Buyvolov (yellow card) 49'; Mitošević (yellow card) 60'	Report	Simčević 50'; João Paulo (yellow card) 82'; Khizhnichenko 88'	Stadium: Astana Arena; Attendance: 0 Referee: Denis Izmailov
Note: Match played at the Astana Arena in Nur-Sultan instead of Shakhter's regular Shakhter Stadium in Karaganda. Match played behind closed doors due to the COVID-19 pandemic in Kazakhstan.

5 April 2021 3	Kyzylzhar	2 – 0	Shakhter Karagandy	Petropavl
15:00 (UTC+6)	Zorić 15' (yellow card) 64'; Grigalashvili 40' (pen.); A.Saparov (yellow card) 45+2'; Lobantsev (yellow card) 90+1'	Report	M.Gabyshev (yellow card) 18'; Sultanov (yellow card) 37'; Balashov (yellow card) 40'	Stadium: Karasai Stadium; Attendance: 2,000; Referee: Aydin Rakhimbaev

9 April 2021 4	Taraz	4 – 0	Shakhter Karagandy	Taraz
15:00 (UTC+6)	Obilor 20', 44'; Baytana (yellow card) 35'; B.Shaykhov (yellow card) 45+3'; Eugénio 51'; Adamović 90+2'	Report	Bakayev (yellow card) 32'; M.Gabyshev (yellow card) 35'; J-A.Payruz (yellow card) 41'	Stadium: Central Stadium; Attendance: 1,500; Referee: Igor Chesnokov

14 April 2021 5	Shakhter Karagandy	1 – 2	Akzhayik	Nur-Sultan
16:00 (UTC+6)	A.Tattybaev 44'; Baah (yellow card) 81'; J-A.Payruz (yellow card) 82'	Report	Baah 38' (o.g.); Chychykov (yellow card) 45'; D.Atanaskoski 74' (o.g.); Shvyrev (yellow card) 81'	Stadium: Astana Arena; Attendance: 0 Referee: Alexander Zatula
Note: Match played at the Astana Arena in Nur-Sultan instead of Shakhter's regular Shakhter Stadium in Karaganda. Match played behind closed doors due to the COVID-19 pandemic in Kazakhstan.

19 April 2021 6	Aktobe	0 – 3	Shakhter Karagandy	Aktobe
17:00 (UTC+6)	Doumbia (yellow card) 35'; Dubajić (yellow card) 72'	Report	Khubulov 5', 23' (yellow card) 75'; A.Tattybaev 73'; M.Gabyshev (yellow card) 81'; Najaryan (yellow card) 90+2'	Stadium: Central Stadium; Attendance: 0 Referee: Denis Tevyashov
Note: Match played behind closed doors due to the COVID-19 pandemic in Kazakhstan.

23 April 2021 7	Shakhter Karagandy	0 – 1	Astana	Nur-Sultan
17:00 (UTC+6)	Buyvolov (yellow card) 57'; D.Atanaskoski (yellow card) 62'; Sultanov (yellow card) 90+2'	Report	Ciupercă 19' (yellow card) 64'; Tomašević (yellow card) 39'; Gurman (yellow card) 90'; Rukavina (yellow card) 90+3'	Stadium: Astana Arena; Attendance: 0 Referee: Denis Izmailov
Note: Match played at the Astana Arena in Nur-Sultan instead of Shakhter's regular Shakhter Stadium in Karaganda. Match played behind closed doors due to the COVID-19 pandemic in Kazakhstan.

29 April 2021 8	Zhetysu	0 – 1	Shakhter Karagandy	Taldıqorğan
16:00 (UTC+6)	A.Dzhanuzakov (yellow card) 26'	Report	R.Aslan 34' (o.g.); M.Gabyshev (yellow card) 56'	Stadium: Zhetysu Stadium; Attendance: 0 Referee: Alexander Gauser

3 May 2021 9	Shakhter Karagandy	1 – 1	Kaisar	Nur-Sultan
20:00 (UTC+6)	Balashov 7'; T.Zakirov (yellow card) 65'; Najaryan (yellow card) 90'	Report	Čađenović (yellow card) 26'; Potapov (yellow card) 56'; N'Diaye (yellow card) 76'; Pavlov 81' (o.g.)	Stadium: Astana Arena; Attendance: 0 Referee: Sergey Gorokhovodatsky
Note: Match played at the Astana Arena in Nur-Sultan instead of Shakhter's regular Shakhter Stadium in Karaganda. Match played behind closed doors due to the COVID-19 pandemic in Kazakhstan.

8 May 2021 10	Kairat	1 – 1	Shakhter Karagandy	Almaty
19:00 (UTC+6)	A.Shushenachev 51'	Report	D.Atanaskoski (yellow card) 29'; Najaryan (yellow card) 42'; Mitošević (yellow card) 74'; Alip 90+4' (o.g.)	Stadium: Central Stadium; Attendance: 0 Referee: Bolat Karlibaev
Note: Match played behind closed doors due to the COVID-19 pandemic in Kazakhstan.

14 May 2021 11	Shakhter Karagandy	0 – 1	Turan	Nur-Sultan
14:00 (UTC+6)	Najaryan (yellow card) 12'	Report	Nusserbayev 20' (pen.) (yellow card) 48'; A.Pasechenko (yellow card) 90+4'	Stadium: Astana Arena; Attendance: 0 Referee: Anton Kuchma
Note: Match played at the Astana Arena in Nur-Sultan instead of Shakhter's regular Shakhter Stadium in Karaganda. Match played behind closed doors due to the COVID-19 pandemic in Kazakhstan.

19 May 2021 12	Caspiy	3 – 0	Shakhter Karagandy	Aktau
18:00 (UTC+6)	Karayev 2', 31'; W.Sahli 9'; Zaleski (yellow card) 52'; Bukorac (yellow card) 60'; Cuckić (yellow card) 78'; A.Armenov (penalty missed) 90+3'	Report	Sultanov (yellow card) 29'; Udo (yellow card) 47'; M.Galkin (yellow card) 84'	Stadium: Zhastar Stadium; Attendance: 1,200; Referee: Alexander Gauzer

24 May 2021 13	Shakhter Karagandy	0 – 3	Tobol	Nur-Sultan
20:00 (UTC+6)	Y.Kybyray (yellow card) 27'; D.Atanaskoski (yellow card) 38'; M.Gabyshev (yellow card) 65'; Balashov (yellow card) 84'	Report	Tagybergen 30', 57' (pen.); Muzhikov (yellow card) 39'; S.Zharynbetov (yellow card) 59'; Lobjanidze 81'	Stadium: Astana Arena; Attendance: 200; Referee: Aidyn Rakhimbaev

29 May 2021 14	Ordabasy	0 – 0	Shakhter Karagandy	Shymkent
18:00 (UTC+6)	João Paulo (penalty missed) 58'	Report	Bakayev (yellow card) 57'; T.Nurseitov (yellow card) 60'; Gapon (yellow card) 87'	Stadium: Kazhymukan Munaitpasov Stadium; Attendance: 1,500; Referee: Alexander Gauzer

12 June 2021 15	Shakhter Karagandy	0 – 1	Kyzylzhar	Karaganda
21:00 (UTC+6)	Najaryan (yellow card) 87'; E.Alishauskas (yellow card) 90+4'	Report	Drachenko (yellow card) 82'; Lobantsev (yellow card) 90+6'	Stadium: Shakhter Stadium; Attendance: 4,000; Referee: Denis Izmailov

18 June 2021 16	Shakhter Karagandy	1 – 0	Taraz	Karaganda
19:00 (UTC+6)	Chochiyev 21'; Gabyshev (yellow card) 50'	Report	Obilor (yellow card) 20'; D.Karaman (yellow card) 52'; Z.Zhaksylykov (yellow card) 56'; Adamović (yellow card) 81'; Eugénio (yellow card) 89'	Stadium: Shakhter Stadium; Attendance: 3,500; Referee: Aydin Rakhimbaev

22 June 2021 17	Akzhayik	1 – 1	Shakhter Karagandy	Oral
20:00 (UTC+6)	Kovtalyuk 54'; Michurenkov (yellow card) 90+7'	Report	Gabyshev (yellow card) 47' (yellow-red card) 90+7'; D.Atanaskoski (yellow card) 58'; Nazarenko 62' (o.g.); Najaryan (yellow card) 81'; Y.Kybyray (yellow card) 88'	Stadium: Petr Atoyan Stadium; Attendance: 1,600; Referee: Igor Chesnokov

27 June 2021 18	Shakhter Karagandy	1 – 0	Aktobe	Karaganda
19:00 (UTC+6)	Najaryan (yellow card) 25'; Bakayev (yellow card) 60'; J-A.Payruz 67' (yellow card) 68'	Report	R.Nurmugamet (yellow card) 86'	Stadium: Shakhter Stadium; Attendance: 0 Referee: Alisher Azhimov
Note: Match played behind closed doors due to the COVID-19 pandemic in Kazakhstan.

2 July 2021 19	Astana	4 – 3	Shakhter Karagandy	Nur-Sultan
19:00 (UTC+6)	Ebong 6'; Ciupercă 26' (yellow card) 89'; Gurman (yellow card) 54'; Aimbetov 55' (yellow card) 56'; Barseghyan 77'	Report	I.Sviridov 41'; Najaryan 63'; Y.Kybyray 78'; J-A.Payruz (yellow card) 83'	Stadium: Astana Arena; Attendance: 1,800; Referee: Bolat Karlibaev

12 September 2021 20	Shakhter Karagandy	3 – 1	Zhetysu	Karaganda
17:00 (UTC+6)	Omirtayev 7', 20'; A.Nazimkhanov (yellow card) 30'; Shikavka 41'	Report	Oduenyi 33'; A.Baltabekov (yellow card) 83'	Stadium: Shakhter Stadium; Attendance: 0 Referee: Igor Chesnokov
Note: Match played behind closed doors due to the COVID-19 pandemic in Kazakhstan.

19 September 2021 21	Kaisar	1 – 2	Shakhter Karagandy	Kyzylorda
21:00 (UTC+6)	Bayzhanov (yellow card) 21'; N'Diaye (yellow card) 34'; Narzildayev (yellow card) 69'; Kenesov 77'	Report	Shatsky (yellow card) 59'; Rustemović (yellow card) 69'; Mawutor 71' (yellow card) 83' (yellow-red card) 90+1'; Shikavka (yellow card) 73'; Tattybaev 90+5'	Stadium: Gani Muratbayev Stadium; Attendance: 1,500; Referee: Sergey Nozhenko

26 September 2021 22	Shakhter Karagandy	1 – 1	Kairat	Karaganda
20:00 (UTC+6)	Gabyshev (yellow card) 21'; Lamanje (yellow card) 69'; Umayev 77'	Report	Alip (yellow card) 41'; Bagnack (yellow card) 63'; Kanté (yellow card) 67'; Dugalić 89'	Stadium: Shakhter Stadium; Attendance: 2,500; Referee: Alexander Gauser

2 October 2021 23	Turan	0 – 0	Shakhter Karagandy	Turkistan
19:00 (UTC+6)	T.Amirov (yellow card) 25'; Nuserbayev (yellow card) 64'	Report	Graf (yellow card) 61'; Shikavka (yellow card) 88'	Stadium: Turkistan Arena; Attendance: 800; Referee: Rustam Omarov

16 October 2021 24	Shakhter Karagandy	1 – 0	Caspiy	Karaganda
17:00 (UTC+6)	Graf (yellow card) 50'; Gabyshev (yellow card) 51'; Mawutor (yellow card) 64'; Umayev 73'	Report	A.Nabikhanov (yellow card) 62'; Darabayev (yellow card) 88'	Stadium: Shakhter Stadium; Attendance: 3,000; Referee: Sergey Nozhenko

24 October 2021 25	Tobol	4 – 1	Shakhter Karagandy	Kostanay
15:00 (UTC+6)	Marochkin 16'; Sergeyev 31'; Nurgaliyev 56'; Lobjanidze 83'; Z.Zhumashev (yellow card) 90+5'	Report	T.Nurseitov (yellow card) 22'; A.Altynkhan (yellow card) 53'; A.Giorgiadi 86'	Stadium: Central Stadium; Attendance: 1,500; Referee: Daniyar Sakhi

30 October 2021 26	Shakhter Karagandy	3 – 1	Atyrau	Karaganda
14:00 (UTC+6)	Bukorac (yellow card) 23'; Tattybayev 39'; Y.Kybyray (yellow card) 50'; Gabyshev 64'; Umayev 78'	Report	Grzelczak 16' (yellow card) 86'; A.Zhumakhanov (yellow card) 51'; D.Kayralliev (yellow card) 74'	Stadium: Shakhter Stadium; Attendance: Saken Bayimbet; Referee: 1,000

==== League table ====
Pos	Team	Pld	W	D	L	GF	GA	GD	Pts	Qualification or relegation
4	Kyzylzhar	26	11	6	9	32	24	+8	39	Qualification for the Europa Conference League second qualifying round
5	Ordabasy	26	10	8	8	36	35	+1	38	
6	Shakhter Karagandy	26	9	6	11	25	34	−9	33	
7	Aktobe	26	9	6	11	35	40	−5	33	
8	Caspiy	26	8	8	10	35	35	0	32	

Source: UEFA, Soccerway
Rules for classification: 1) Points; 2) Goal difference; 3) Matches won; 4) Goals scored; 5) Away goals scored; 6) Head-to-head points; 7) Head-to-head matches won; 8) Head-to-head goal difference; 9) Head-to-head goals scored; 10) Head-to-head away goals scored; 11) Draw.

=== Kazakhstan Cup ===
==== Group stage ====
Pos	Team	Pld	W	D	L	GF	GA	GD	Pts	Qualification
1	Shakhter Karagandy (A)	6	4	0	2	18	14	+4	12	Advanced to Quarterfinals
2	Kyzylzhar (A)	6	3	2	1	16	8	+8	11	Advanced to Quarterfinals
3	Ordabasy	5	2	1	2	7	6	+1	7	
4	SDYuShOR 8	5	0	1	4	5	18	−13	1	

Updated to match(es) played on 17 August 2021. Source: PFLK
(A) Advance to a further round

11 July 2021 1	Ordabasy	1 – 0	Shakhter Karagandy	Shymkent
21:00 (UTC+6)	Diakate 90' (pen.)	Report	I.Sviridov (yellow card) 52'; E.Alishauskas (yellow card) 84'; Chochiyev (yellow card) 88'	Stadium: Kazhymukan Munaitpasov Stadium; Attendance: 1,000; Referee: Anton Kuchma

16 July 2021 2	Shakhter Karagandy	3 – 2	Kyzylzhar	Karaganda
19:00 (UTC+6)	D.Atanaskoski (yellow card) 65' (goal) 89'; Graf (yellow card) 69'; A.Tattybaev (yellow card) 73' (goal) 75', 86'; Shatskiy (yellow card) 90+5'	Report	Bushman 49'; Smajlagić 67'; Karshakevich (red card) 72'; D.Shmidt (yellow card) 83'	Stadium: Shakhter Stadium; Attendance: 0 Referee: Grigory Moskovchenko
Note: Match played behind closed doors due to the COVID-19 pandemic in Kazakhstan.

25 July 2021 3	Shakhter Karagandy	7 – 1	SDYuShOR 8	Karaganda
19:00 (UTC+6)	Omirtayev 16', 42' (yellow card) 36'; A.Tattybaev 19', 55'; Buyvolov (yellow card) 45+2'; Z-A.Payruz 46', 59'; Shikavka 62'; Gabyshev (yellow card) 66'	Report	O.Saken (yellow card) 48'; N.Abish (yellow card) 72'; K.Smykov 83'; I.Demin (yellow card) 90+1'	Stadium: Shakhter Stadium; Attendance: 0
Note: Match played behind closed doors due to the COVID-19 pandemic in Kazakhstan.

1 August 2021 4	SDYuShOR 8	0 – 4	Shakhter Karagandy	Nur-Sultan
21:00 (UTC+6)	O.Saken (yellow card) 36'; A.Ismailov (yellow card) 83'	Report	A.Tattybaev 32', 54' (pen.); Omirtayev 51'; T.Nurseitov (yellow card) 62'; Y.Kybyrai (yellow card) 76'; Umayev 84' (pen.)	Stadium: Astana Arena; Attendance: 0 Referee: Anton Moltusinov
Note: Match played behind closed doors due to the COVID-19 pandemic in Kazakhstan. Match played at the Astana Arena in Nur-Sultan instead of regular BIIK Stadium in Shymkent.

14 August 2021 5	Shakhter Karagandy	3 – 2	Ordabasy	Karaganda
19:00 (UTC+6)	A.Nazimkhanov 12'; A.Tattybaev 38', 45'; T.Nurseitov (yellow card) 40'; Umayev (yellow card) 90+2'; Mawutor (yellow card) 90+3'	Report	A.Khadzhiev (yellow card) 25'; Simčević 56' (yellow card) 90+3'; S.Tursynbay (yellow card) 68'; Graf 90' (o.g.)	Stadium: Shakhter Stadium; Attendance: 0 Referee: Alexander Zatula
Note: Match played behind closed doors due to the COVID-19 pandemic in Kazakhstan.

17 August 2021 6	Kyzylzhar	8 – 1	Shakhter Karagandy	Petropavl
17:00 (UTC+6)	B.Savkiv 19' (o.g.); Smajlagić 33', 63'; D.Shmidt 48'; Zorić 54'; A.Izmailov 67', 72'; A.Cheredinov 87'	Report	K.Gorizanov (yellow card) 9'; R.Tutkyshev 44'	Stadium: Karasai Stadium; Attendance: 1,000; Referee: Sayat Karabaev

==== Knockout stages ====
22 September 2021 Quarterfinal 1st leg	Taraz	0 – 0	Shakhter Karagandy	Taraz
19:00 (UTC+6)	A.Taubay (yellow card) 38'	Report	Khozin (yellow card) 76'; Bukorac (yellow card) 79'; Mawutor (yellow card) 85'	Stadium: Central Stadium; Attendance: 2,000; Referee: Bulat Sariev

27 October 2021 Quarterfinal 2nd leg	Shakhter Karagandy	3 – 1 (3 – 1 agg.)	Taraz	Karaganda
16:00 (UTC+6)	D.Atanaskoski 26'; Toshev 59'; Rustemović (yellow card) 70'; Graf (yellow card) 75'; Tattybayev 90'	Report	A.Suley 39' (yellow card) 56'	Stadium: Shakhter Stadium; Attendance: 1,500; Referee: Grigory Moskovchenko

6 November 2021 Semifinal 1st leg	Shakhter Karagandy	5 – 2	Tobol	Nur-Sultan
15:00 (UTC+6)	Umayev 8', 45+1'; D.Atanaskoski 14'; Mawutor 48'; Bukorac (yellow card) 83'; Tattybayev 88'; Shikavka (yellow card) 90'	Report	Tagybergen 45'; Jovančić (yellow card) 45+3'; Sergeyev 58'; Zharynbetov (yellow card) 73'; Z.Zhumashev (yellow card) 85'; Malyi (yellow card) 86'	Stadium: Astana Arena; Attendance: 600; Referee: Igor Chesnokov
Note: Match played at the Astana Arena in Nur-Sultan, instead of Shakhter Karagandy's regular Shakhter Stadium in Karaganda.

21 November 2021 Semifinal 2nd leg	Tobol	0 – 2 (2 – 7 agg.)	Shakhter Karagandy	Kostanay
16:00 (UTC+6)	Manzorro (yellow card) 63'	Report	Nazarenko 35'; Toshev 39'	Stadium: Central Stadium; Attendance: 650; Referee: Daniyar Sakhi

==== Final ====
28 November 2021	Kairat	3 – 3 (9 – 8 p)	Shakhter Karagandy	Nur-Sultan
20:30 (UTC+6)	Vágner Love 6', 40'; Kanté (yellow card) 107'; Shushenachev 110'	Report	Gabyshev 48'; Bukorac (yellow card) 69'; Toshev 75'; Mawutor (yellow card) 82'; Y.Kybyrai (yellow card) 93'; Tattybayev 97' (pen.); Umayev (yellow card) 103'	Stadium: Astana Arena; Attendance: 4,000; Referee: Igor Chesnokov
	Penalties
	Abiken (penalty scored); Alykulov (penalty scored); Alves (penalty scored); Góralski (penalty scored); Alip (penalty missed); Shushenachev (penalty scored); Vorogovsky (penalty scored); Bagnack (penalty scored); Palyakow (penalty scored); Hovhannisyan (penalty scored)		(penalty scored) Graf; (penalty scored) Mawutor; (penalty missed) Y.Kybyrai; (penalty scored) Umayev; (penalty scored) Tattybayev; (penalty scored) Lamanje; (penalty scored) Najaryan; (penalty scored) Khozin; (penalty scored) Shatsky; (penalty missed) Nazimkhanov

=== UEFA Europa Conference League ===
==== Qualifying rounds ====
23 July 2021 Second Qualifying Round 1st leg	FCSB (Romania)	1 – 0	(Kazakhstan) Shakhter Karagandy	Bucharest, Romania
00:30 (UTC+6)	Cordea 38'; Crețu (yellow card) 59'; Ov.Popescu (yellow card) 88'	Report	Mitošević (yellow card) 24'; Khozin (yellow card) 33'	Stadium: Arena Națională; Attendance: 5,812; Referee: Vasilis Dimitriou (Cyprus)

29 July 2021 Second Qualifying Round 2nd leg	Shakhter Karagandy (Kazakhstan)	2 – 1 (a.e.t.) (2 – 2 agg.) (5 – 3 p)	(Romania) FCSB	Yerevan, Armenia
20:00 (UTC+6)	Gabyshev 11'; Tattybaev 90+1' (yellow card) 103'; Rustemović (yellow card) 108'; Mawutor (yellow card) 120+1'	Report	Vučur (yellow card) 36'; Coman (yellow card) 56' (goal) 76'; Șerban (yellow card) 87'; Cordea (yellow card) 108'	Stadium: Vazgen Sargsyan Republican Stadium; Attendance: 0 Referee: Dragomir Draganov (Bulgaria)
	Penalties
	Rustemović (penalty scored); Bukorac (penalty scored); Graf (penalty scored); Atanaskoski (penalty scored); Tattybaev (penalty scored)		(penalty scored) Coman; (penalty scored) Crețu; (penalty missed) Moruțan; (penalty scored) Vučur
Note: Match played at the Vazgen Sargsyan Republican Stadium in Yerevan, Armenia, instead of their regular Shakhter Stadium in Karagandy, Kazakhstan due to the COVID-19 pandemic in Kazakhstan and travel restrictions between Kazakhstan and Romania. Match played behind closed doors.

5 August 2021 Third Qualifying Round 1st leg	Kolos Kovalivka (Ukraine)	0 – 0	(Kazakhstan) Shakhter Karagandy	Kovalivka, Ukraine
(UTC+6)	Bohdanov (yellow card) 39'	Report	Graf (yellow card) 37'; Bukorac (yellow card) 45+3'; D.Atanaskoski (yellow card) 59' (yellow-red card) 76'; Gabyshev (yellow card) 61'	Stadium: Kolos Stadium; Attendance: 3,298; Referee: Peter Kjaesgaard (Denmark)

10 August 2021 Third Qualifying Round 2nd leg	Shakhter Karagandy (Kazakhstan)	0 – 0 (a.e.t.) (0 – 0 agg.) (3–1 p)	(Ukraine) Kolos Kovalivka	Nur-Sultan, Kazakhstan
20:00 (UTC+6)	Bukorac (yellow card) 35'; Lamanje (yellow card) 100'	Report		Stadium: Astana Arena; Attendance: 0 Referee: Halis Özkahya (Turkey)
	Penalties
	Rustemović (penalty scored); Bukorac (penalty scored); Graf (penalty scored)		(penalty missed) Nuriyev; (penalty scored) Chornomorets; (penalty missed) Churko; (penalty missed) Pavlovets
Note: Match played at the Astana Arena in Nur-Sultan, instead of Shakhter Karagandy's regular Shakhter Stadium in Karagandy, which did not meet UEFA requirements. Match played behind closed doors.

19 August 2021 Playoff Round 1st leg	Shakhter Karagandy (Kazakhstan)	1 – 2	(Israel) Maccabi Tel Aviv	Nur-Sultan, Kazakhstan
19:00 (UTC+6)	Umayev 73'	Report	Glazer (yellow card) 47'; Rikan 75' (yellow card) 90+2'; Shamir 77'	Stadium: Astana Arena; Attendance: 0 Referee: Srđan Jovanović (Serbia)
Note: Match played at the Astana Arena in Nur-Sultan, instead of Shakhter Karagandy's regular Shakhter Stadium in Karagandy, which did not meet UEFA requirements. Match played behind closed doors.

26 August 2021 Playoff Round 2nd leg	Maccabi Tel Aviv (Israel)	2 – 0 (4 – 1 agg.)	(Kazakhstan) Shakhter Karagandy	Tel Aviv, Israel
23:30 (UTC+6)	Nachmias 18'; Glazer 40'; Yeini (yellow card) 53'; Saborit (yellow card) 59'; Hernández (yellow card) 89'	Report	Bukorac (yellow card) 35'; Buyvolov (yellow card) 76'; Graf (yellow card) 85'	Stadium: Bloomfield Stadium; Referee: Nikola Dabanović (Montenegro)

== Squad statistics ==
As of match played 28 November 2021

=== Appearances and goals ===
No.	Pos	Nat	Player	Total		Premier League		Kazakhstan Cup		Super Cup		UEFA Europa Conference League	
No.	Pos	Nat	Player	Apps	Goals	Apps	Goals	Apps	Goals	Apps	Goals	Apps	Goals
1	GK	(Kazakhstan) KAZ	Igor Trofimets	5	0	2	0	3	0	0	0	0	0
3	DF	(North Macedonia) MKD	David Atanaskoski	31	3	18+2	0	7	3	0	0	4	0
5	DF	(Kazakhstan) KAZ	Mikhail Gabyshev	34	3	18+3	1	4+4	1	0+1	0	4	1
7	MF	(Kazakhstan) KAZ	Gevorg Najaryan	31	1	13+6	1	5+2	0	1	0	2+2	0
8	MF	(Serbia) SRB	Stefan Bukorac	13	0	4	0	4	0	0	0	5	0
9	FW	(Kazakhstan) KAZ	Aydos Tattybaev	38	16	13+9	4	3+7	11	0+1	0	1+4	1
10	FW	(Russia) RUS	Idris Umayev	15	7	2+3	3	7	3	0	0	0+3	1
11	MF	(Russia) RUS	Alan Chochiyev	20	1	7+7	1	1+5	0	0	0	0	0
13	DF	(Belarus) BLR	Pavel Nazarenko	11	1	1+1	0	4+2	1	0	0	2+1	0
15	MF	(Ghana) GHA	David Mawutor	15	2	2+1	1	4+2	1	0	0	6	0
16	DF	(Kazakhstan) KAZ	Yeskendir Kybyray	36	1	19+3	1	5+1	0	2	0	1+5	0
17	MF	(Kazakhstan) KAZ	Pavel Kriventsev	11	0	2+6	0	0+1	0	2	0	0	0
19	FW	(Kazakhstan) KAZ	Oralkhan Omirtayev	17	5	4+1	2	3+4	3	0	0	1+4	0
22	FW	(Kazakhstan) KAZ	Ivan Sviridov	10	1	1+4	1	3+1	0	0	0	1	0
23	MF	(Kazakhstan) KAZ	Ruslan Tutkyshev	1	1	0	0	1	1	0	0	0	0
24	FW	(Canada) CAN	Aramis Kouzine	1	0	0+1	0	0	0	0	0	0	0
25	DF	(Russia) RUS	Andrey Buyvolov	25	0	11+1	0	5	0	2	0	6	0
27	DF	(Russia) RUS	Vladimir Khozin	16	0	5+1	0	6	0	0	0	3+1	0
29	MF	(Serbia) SRB	Vuk Mitošević	29	0	15+3	0	4	0	2	0	5	0
30	GK	(Kazakhstan) KAZ	Igor Shatskiy	28	0	13+1	0	7	0	1	0	6	0
31	MF	(Kazakhstan) KAZ	Aidos Oral	1	0	0	0	1	0	0	0	0	0
33	DF	(Cameroon) CMR	Abdel Lamanje	16	0	6	0	6	0	0	0	2+2	0
34	MF	(Kazakhstan) KAZ	Abylaikhan Nazimkhanov	14	1	2+3	0	5+1	1	0	0	0+3	0
37	MF	(Kazakhstan) KAZ	Shyngys Flyuk	1	0	0	0	1	0	0	0	0	0
41	MF	(Kazakhstan) KAZ	Almas Tyulyubay	1	0	0	0	1	0	0	0	0	0
42	FW	(Kazakhstan) KAZ	Andrey Giorgiadi	1	1	0+1	1	0	0	0	0	0	0
43	MF	(Kazakhstan) KAZ	Ualikhan Mukhametzhanov	1	0	0	0	1	0	0	0	0	0
44	MF	(Bosnia and Herzegovina) BIH	Edin Rustemović	18	0	3+3	0	6	0	0	0	3+3	0
46	GK	(Kazakhstan) KAZ	Roman Klyushnev	1	0	0	0	1	0	0	0	0	0
48	DF	(Kazakhstan) KAZ	Timofey Tronza	1	0	0	0	1	0	0	0	0	0
49	MF	(Kazakhstan) KAZ	Alshin Bayzakhov	2	0	1	0	0+1	0	0	0	0	0
50	DF	(Kazakhstan) KAZ	Tair Nurseitov	21	0	6+9	0	5	0	0	0	0+1	0
51	DF	(Kazakhstan) KAZ	Amir Tleubaev	1	0	0+1	0	0	0	0	0	0	0
52	DF	(Kazakhstan) KAZ	Konstantin Gorizanov	1	0	0	0	1	0	0	0	0	0
53	DF	(Kazakhstan) KAZ	Adil Akhanov	1	0	1	0	0	0	0	0	0	0
54	FW	(Kazakhstan) KAZ	Maxim Galkin	7	0	0+4	0	0+2	0	0+1	0	0	0
55	DF	(Croatia) CRO	Ivan Graf	25	0	11	0	5+1	0	2	0	6	0
56	FW	(Kazakhstan) KAZ	Kirill Novikov	1	0	0+1	0	0	0	0	0	0	0
57	DF	(Kazakhstan) KAZ	Egor Alishauskas	10	0	1+5	0	2+2	0	0	0	0	0
62	DF	(Kazakhstan) KAZ	Dzhokhangir Abilmazhinov	1	0	1	0	0	0	0	0	0	0
64	MF	(Kazakhstan) KAZ	Rudolf Wagner	1	0	0	0	0+1	0	0	0	0	0
66	DF	(Kazakhstan) KAZ	Bogdan Savkiv	1	0	0	0	1	0	0	0	0	0
67	DF	(Kazakhstan) KAZ	Aleksandr Bezrodniy	1	0	1	0	0	0	0	0	0	0
76	MF	(Kazakhstan) KAZ	Almat Nurgazy	1	0	1	0	0	0	0	0	0	0
79	MF	(Kazakhstan) KAZ	Ansar Altynkhan	1	0	1	0	0	0	0	0	0	0
80	FW	(Kazakhstan) KAZ	Georgiy Zakharenko	1	0	0	0	1	0	0	0	0	0
82	MF	(Kazakhstan) KAZ	Aleksandr Vasyunkin	1	0	0+1	0	0	0	0	0	0	0
83	MF	(Kazakhstan) KAZ	Kirill Lavrenyuk	1	0	1	0	0	0	0	0	0	0
87	MF	(Russia) RUS	Mikhail Bakayev	20	0	14+1	0	2+1	0	0	0	1+1	0
88	MF	(Russia) RUS	Arsen Khubulov	14	2	10+2	2	0	0	1+1	0	0	0
89	FW	(Bulgaria) BUL	Martin Toshev	17	3	6+4	0	5	3	0	0	1+1	0
96	FW	(Kazakhstan) KAZ	Damir Bitusupov	1	0	0	0	0+1	0	0	0	0	0
98	FW	(Kazakhstan) KAZ	Timur Mukhametzhanov	1	0	1	0	0	0	0	0	0	0
99	FW	(Belarus) BLR	Yevgeniy Shikavka	15	2	3+2	1	0+4	1	0	0	6	0
Players away from Shakhter Karagandy on loan:
18	MF	(Armenia) ARM	Solomon Udo	19	0	15+1	0	1	0	2	0	0	0
70	MF	(Kazakhstan) KAZ	Jean-Ali Payruz	16	4	2+9	1	1+2	2	1+1	1	0	0
Players who left Shakhter Karagandy during the season:
4	DF	(Ghana) GHA	Gideon Baah	6	0	5	0	0	0	1	0	0	0
10	FW	(Ukraine) UKR	Vitaliy Balashov	15	2	10+3	2	0	0	2	0	0	0
33	DF	(Russia) RUS	Yevgeny Gapon	9	0	9	0	0	0	0	0	0	0
39	MF	(Belgium) BEL	Ziguy Badibanga	6	0	1+5	0	0	0	0	0	0	0
44	DF	(Kazakhstan) KAZ	Karam Sultanov	13	0	11	0	0	0	1+1	0	0	0
78	GK	(Kazakhstan) KAZ	Timurbek Zakirov	14	0	11+1	0	0	0	1+1	0	0	0
91	FW	(Ukraine) UKR	Yevhen Pavlov	9	0	2+5	0	0	0	1+1	0	0	0
99	FW	(Nigeria) NGR	Joseph Adah	1	0	0	0	0	0	0+1	0	0	0

=== Goal scorers ===
Place	Position	Nation	Number	Name	Premier League	Kazakhstan Cup	Super Cup	UEFA Europa Conference League	Total
1	FW	(Kazakhstan)	9	Aydos Tattybaev	4	11	0	1	16
2	FW	(Russia)	10	Idris Umayev	3	3	0	1	7
3	FW	(Kazakhstan)	19	Oralkhan Omirtayev	2	3	0	0	5
4	MF	(Kazakhstan)	70	Jean-Ali Payruz	1	2	1	0	4
5	DF	(Kazakhstan)	5	Mikhail Gabyshev	1	1	0	1	3
5	DF	(North Macedonia)	3	David Atanaskoski	0	3	0	0	3
5	FW	(Bulgaria)	89	Martin Toshev	0	3	0	0	3
5				Own goal	3	0	0	0	3
9	MF	(Russia)	88	Arsen Khubulov	2	0	0	0	2
9	FW	(Ukraine)	10	Vitaliy Balashov	2	0	0	0	2
9	FW	(Belarus)	99	Yevgeniy Shikavka	1	1	0	0	2
9	MF	(Ghana)	15	David Mawutor	1	1	0	0	2
13	MF	(Russia)	11	Alan Chochiyev	1	0	0	0	1
13	FW	(Kazakhstan)	22	Ivan Sviridov	1	0	0	0	1
13	MF	(Kazakhstan)	7	Gevorg Najaryan	1	0	0	0	1
13	DF	(Kazakhstan)	16	Yeskendir Kybyray	1	0	0	0	1
13	FW	(Kazakhstan)	42	Andrey Giorgiadi	1	0	0	0	1
13	MF	(Kazakhstan)	34	Abylaikhan Nazimkhanov	0	1	0	0	1
13	MF	(Kazakhstan)	23	Ruslan Tutkyshev	0	1	0	0	1
13	df	(Belarus)	13	Pavel Nazarenko	0	1	0	0	1
				TOTALS	25	31	1	3	60

=== Clean sheets ===
Place	Position	Nation	Number	Name	Premier League	Kazakhstan Cup	Super Cup	UEFA Europa Conference League	Total
1	GK	(Kazakhstan)	30	Igor Shatskiy	5	2	0	2	9
2	GK	(Kazakhstan)	78	Timurbek Zakirov	2	0	0	0	2
3	GK	(Kazakhstan)	1	Igor Trofimets	0	1	0	0	1
				TOTALS	7	3	0	2	12

=== Disciplinary record ===
Number	Nation	Position	Name	Premier League		Kazakhstan Cup		Super Cup		UEFA Europa Conference League		Total	
Number	Nation	Position	Name	Booked	Sent off (straight red)	Booked	Sent off (straight red)	Booked	Sent off (straight red)	Booked	Sent off (straight red)	Booked	Sent off (straight red)
3	(North Macedonia)	DF	David Atanaskoski	4	0	1	0	0	0	2	1	7	1
5	(Kazakhstan)	DF	Mikhail Gabyshev	10	1	1	0	1	0	1	0	13	1
7	(Kazakhstan)	MF	Gevorg Najaryan	7	0	0	0	0	0	0	0	7	0
8	(Serbia)	MF	Stefan Bukorac	1	0	3	0	0	0	3	0	7	0
9	(Kazakhstan)	FW	Aydos Tattybaev	0	0	1	0	0	0	1	0	2	0
10	(Russia)	FW	Idris Umayev	0	0	2	0	0	0	0	0	2	0
11	(Russia)	MF	Alan Chochiyev	0	0	1	0	0	0	0	0	1	0
15	(Ghana)	MF	David Mawutor	3	1	3	0	0	0	1	0	7	1
16	(Kazakhstan)	DF	Yeskendir Kybyray	3	0	2	0	1	0	0	0	6	0
19	(Kazakhstan)	FW	Oralkhan Omirtayev	0	0	1	0	0	0	0	0	1	0
22	(Kazakhstan)	FW	Ivan Sviridov	0	0	1	0	0	0	0	0	1	0
25	(Russia)	DF	Andrey Buyvolov	2	0	1	0	0	0	1	0	4	0
27	(Russia)	DF	Vladimir Khozin	0	0	1	0	0	0	1	0	2	0
29	(Serbia)	MF	Vuk Mitošević	2	0	0	0	0	0	1	0	3	0
30	(Kazakhstan)	GK	Igor Shatskiy	1	0	1	0	0	0	0	0	2	0
33	(Cameroon)	DF	Abdel Lamanje	1	0	0	0	0	0	1	0	2	0
34	(Kazakhstan)	MF	Abylaikhan Nazimkhanov	1	0	0	0	0	0	0	0	1	0
44	(Bosnia and Herzegovina)	MF	Edin Rustemović	1	0	1	0	0	0	1	0	3	0
50	(Kazakhstan)	DF	Tair Nurseitov	2	0	2	0	0	0	0	0	4	0
52	(Kazakhstan)	DF	Konstantin Gorizanov	0	0	1	0	0	0	0	0	1	0
55	(Croatia)	DF	Ivan Graf	1	0	0	0	0	0	1	0	2	0
57	(Kazakhstan)	DF	Egor Alishauskas	1	0	1	0	0	0	0	0	2	0
54	(Kazakhstan)	FW	Maxim Galkin	1	0	0	0	0	0	0	0	1	0
55	(Croatia)	DF	Ivan Graf	1	0	2	0	1	0	1	0	5	0
79	(Kazakhstan)	MF	Ansar Altynkhan	1	0	0	0	0	0	0	0	1	0
87	(Russia)	MF	Mikhail Bakayev	3	0	0	0	0	0	0	0	3	0
88	(Russia)	MF	Arsen Khubulov	1	0	0	0	0	0	0	0	1	0
99	(Belarus)	FW	Yevgeniy Shikavka	2	0	1	0	0	0	0	0	3	0
Players away on loan:
18	(Armenia)	MF	Solomon Udo	2	0	0	0	1	0	0	0	3	0
70	(Kazakhstan)	FW	Jean-Ali Payruz	4	0	0	0	1	0	0	0	5	0
Players who left Shakhter Karagandy during the season:
4	(Ghana)	DF	Gideon Baah	2	0	0	0	0	0	0	0	2	0
10	(Ukraine)	FW	Vitaliy Balashov	2	0	0	0	0	0	0	0	2	0
33	(Russia)	DF	Yevgeny Gapon	1	0	0	0	0	0	0	0	1	0
44	(Kazakhstan)	DF	Karam Sultanov	3	0	0	0	0	0	0	0	3	0
78	(Kazakhstan)	GK	Timurbek Zakirov	1	0	0	0	0	0	0	0	1	0
91	(Ukraine)	FW	Yevhen Pavlov	2	0	0	0	0	0	0	0	2	0
			TOTALS	66	2	27	0	5	0	15	1	113	3
