= 2020 FC Shakhter Karagandy season =

FC Shakhter Karagandy
2020 season
- Chairman: Sergei Yegorov
- Manager: Vyacheslav Hroznyi (until 17 June); Konstantin Gorovenka (from 18 June)
- Stadium: Shakhter Stadium
- Premier League: 4th
- Kazakhstan Cup: Canceled due to the COVID-19 pandemic
- Top goalscorer: League: Two Players (5); All: Two Players (5)
Home colours	Away colours

The 2020 FC Shakhter Karagandy season was the 30th successive season that the club played in the Kazakhstan Premier League, the highest tier of association football in Kazakhstan. Shakhter Karagandy finished the season in 4th position and as a result qualified for the 2021–22 UEFA Europa Conference League.

== Season events ==
On 13 March, the Football Federation of Kazakhstan announced all league fixtures would be played behind closed doors for the foreseeable future due to the COVID-19 pandemic.

On 17 June Vyacheslav Hroznyi his role as manager by mutual consent, with Konstantin Gorovenka being appointed as his replacement the following day.

On 26 June, it was announced that the league would resume on 1 July, with no fans being permitted to watch the games. The league was suspended for a second time on 3 July, for an initial two weeks, due to an increase in COVID-19 cases in the country.

=== New Contracts ===
On 24 January, Shakhter Karagandy extended their contract with Jean-Ali Payruz.

On 8 February, Yerkebulan Nurgaliyev and Gevorg Najaryan signed new contracts with Shakhter Karagandy. On 16 March the Football Federation of Kazakhstan suspended all football until 15 April.

=== Transfers ===
On 21 July, Shakhter Karagandy announced the signing of Erkin Tapalov from Caspiy. Five days later, 26 July, Aydos Tattybaev also joined Shakhter Karagandy from Caspiy.

On 6 August, Shakhter Karagandy announced the signing of Ruslan Mingazow, with Soslan Takulov joining from Slutsk on 9 August.

== Squad ==
As of match played 30 November 2020

No.	Name	Nationality	Position	Date of birth (age)	Signed from	Signed in	Apps.	Goals
Goalkeepers|-
1	David Yurchenko	(Armenia)	GK	27 March 1986 (aged 34)	Yenisey Krasnoyarsk	2020	7	0
40	Yegor Tsuprikov	(Kazakhstan)	GK	27 May 1997 (aged 23)	Bolat	2018	10	0
78	Timurbek Zakirov	(Kazakhstan)	GK	1 March 1996 (aged 24)	Kyzylzhar	2020	6	0
Defenders
2	Dmitri Yatchenko	(Russia)	DF	25 August 1986 (aged 34)	Dinamo Minsk	2020	16	0
3	Yevhen Tkachuk	(Ukraine)	DF	27 June 1991 (aged 29)	Stal Kamianske	2018	64	4
4	Gideon Baah	(Ghana)	DF	1 October 1991 (aged 29)	Honka	2020	19	2
5	Soslan Takulov	(Russia)	DF	28 April 1995 (aged 25)	Slutsk	2020	16	0
25	Andrey Buyvolov	(Russia)	DF	12 January 1987 (aged 33)	Yenisey Krasnoyarsk	2020	19	2
33	Abdel Lamanje	(Cameroon)	DF	27 July 1990 (aged 30)	Kaisar	2020	17	2
57	Birzhan Kulbekov	(Kazakhstan)	DF	18 December 1997 (aged 22)	Bolat	2020	0	0
66	Bogdan Savkiv	(Kazakhstan)	DF	28 August 2001 (aged 19)	Youth Team	2020	0	0
Midfielders
8	Muhammed Usman	(Nigeria)	MF	2 March 1994 (aged 26)	Tambov	2020	18	1
17	Aslanbek Kakimov	(Kazakhstan)	MF	2 October 1993 (aged 27)	Aktobe	2020	5	0
20	Ruslan Mingazow	(Turkmenistan)	MF	23 November 1991 (aged 29)	Irtysh Pavlodar	2020	13	3
23	Ruslan Tutkyshev	(Kazakhstan)	MF	18 February 1999 (aged 21)	Youth Team	2020	0	0
26	Erkin Tapalov	(Kazakhstan)	MF	3 September 1993 (aged 27)	Caspiy	2020	12	1
47	Pavel Kriventsev	(Kazakhstan)	MF	2 October 1993 (aged 27)	Kyzylzhar	2020	19	0
50	Tair Nurseitov	(Kazakhstan)	MF	11 July 2000 (aged 20)	Academy	2020	1	0
57	Egor Alishauskas	(Kazakhstan)	MF	18 December 1997 (aged 22)	Bolat	2020	1	0
77	Gevorg Najaryan	(Kazakhstan)	MF	6 January 1998 (aged 22)	Astana	2018	85	3
87	Mikhail Bakayev	(Russia)	MF	5 August 1987 (aged 33)	Shinnik Yaroslavl	2020	17	0
88	Arsen Khubulov	(Russia)	MF	13 December 1990 (aged 29)	Yenisey Krasnoyarsk	2020	19	5
Forwards
10	Aydos Tattybaev	(Kazakhstan)	FW	26 April 1990 (aged 30)	Caspiy	2020	17	5
11	Sergei Zenjov	(Estonia)	FW	20 April 1989 (aged 31)	KS Cracovia	2019	47	11
12	Cédric Kouadio	(Ivory Coast)	FW	25 July 1997 (aged 23)	Slutsk	2020	1	0
70	Jean-Ali Payruz	(Kazakhstan)	FW	12 August 1999 (aged 21)	Youth Team	2019	40	2
Away on loan
22	Marat Shakhmetov	(Kazakhstan)	MF	6 February 1989 (aged 31)	Akzhayik	2017	88	8
Left during the season
5	Aleksandr Kislitsyn	(Kazakhstan)	DF	8 March 1986 (aged 34)	Okzhetpes	2020		
6	Aliyu Abubakar	(Nigeria)	DF	15 June 1996 (aged 24)	Olimpik Donetsk	2020	1	0
7	Jérémy Manzorro	(France)	MF	11 November 1991 (aged 29)	Irtysh Pavlodar	2020	3	1
9	Bauyrzhan Turysbek	(Kazakhstan)	FW	15 October 1991 (aged 29)	Tobol	2020	3	1
10	Yerkebulan Nurgaliyev	(Kazakhstan)	MF	12 September 1993 (aged 27)	Akzhayik	2019	30	4
19	Matvey Gerasimov	(Kazakhstan)	FW	4 February 2001 (aged 19)	Youth Team	2020	0	0

=== On loan ===
Note: Flags indicate national team as defined under FIFA eligibility rules; some limited exceptions apply. Players may hold more than one non-FIFA nationality.

No. / Pos. / Nation / Player; 22 / MF / KAZ / Marat Shakhmetov (at Caspiy)	No. / Pos. / Nation / Player

== Transfers ==
=== In ===
Date	Position	Nationality	Name	From	Fee	Ref.
Winter 2020	MF	(Nigeria)	Muhammed Usman	Tambov	Free	
Winter 2020	FW	(Ivory Coast)	Cédric Kouadio	Slutsk	Free	
22 January 2020	GK	(Armenia)	David Yurchenko		Free	
24 January 2020	DF	(Cameroon)	Abdel Lamanje	Kaisar	Free	
24 January 2020	DF	(Ghana)	Gideon Baah	Honka	Free	
5 February 2020	DF	(Nigeria)	Aliyu Abubakar	Olimpik Donetsk	Free	
8 February 2020	DF	(Kazakhstan)	Aleksandr Kislitsyn	Okzhetpes	Free	
12 February 2020	MF	(France)	Jérémy Manzorro	Irtysh Pavlodar	Free	
12 February 2020	MF	(Kazakhstan)	Aslanbek Kakimov	Aktobe	Undisclosed	
26 February 2020	MF	(Russia)	Mikhail Bakayev	Shinnik Yaroslavl	Free	
26 February 2020	FW	(Kazakhstan)	Bauyrzhan Turysbek	Tobol	Free	
27 February 2020	DF	(Russia)	Andrey Buyvolov	Yenisey Krasnoyarsk	Free	
27 February 2020	DF	(Russia)	Dmitri Yatchenko	Dinamo Minsk	Free	
21 July 2020	MF	(Kazakhstan)	Erkin Tapalov	Caspiy	Undisclosed	
26 July 2020	FW	(Kazakhstan)	Aydos Tattybaev	Caspiy	Undisclosed	
6 August 2020	MF	(Turkmenistan)	Ruslan Mingazow	Irtysh Pavlodar	Free	
9 August 2020	DF	(Russia)	Soslan Takulov	Slutsk	Undisclosed	

=== Out ===
Date	Position	Nationality	Name	To	Fee	Ref.
4 August 2020	MF	(France)	Jérémy Manzorro	Tobol	Undisclosed	
10 August 2020	FW	(Kazakhstan)	Bauyrzhan Turysbek	Taraz	Undisclosed	
1 October 2020	FW	(Kazakhstan)	Matvey Gerasimov	Metalist Kharkiv	Undisclosed	

=== Loans out ===
Date from	Position	Nationality	Name	To	Date to	Ref.
26 February 2020	MF	(Kazakhstan)	Marat Shakhmetov	Caspiy	End of Season	

=== Released ===
Date	Position	Nationality	Name	Joined	Date	Ref.
	MF	(Kosovo)	Donjet Shkodra	Zhetysu		
30 June 2020	DF	(Kazakhstan)	Aleksandr Kislitsyn	Zhetysu		
30 June 2020	DF	(Nigeria)	Aliyu Abubakar	Okzhetpes		
30 June 2020	FW	(Kazakhstan)	Yerkebulan Nurgaliyev	Caspiy		
31 December 2020	GK	(Armenia)	David Yurchenko	Alashkert	14 January 2021	
31 December 2020	GK	(Kazakhstan)	Yegor Tsuprikov	Tobol	18 February 2021	
31 December 2020	DF	(Cameroon)	Abdel Lamanje	Astra Giurgiu		
31 December 2020	DF	(Russia)	Dmitri Yatchenko	Akron Tolyatti	10 January 2021	
31 December 2020	DF	(Kazakhstan)	Yevhen Tkachuk	Metalist 1925 Kharkiv		
31 December 2020	DF	(Russia)	Soslan Takulov	Akzhayik	20 February 2021	
31 December 2020	MF	(Kazakhstan)	Aslanbek Kakimov			
31 December 2020	MF	(Kazakhstan)	Marat Shakhmetov	Taraz		
31 December 2020	MF	(Kazakhstan)	Erkin Tapalov	Akzhayik	19 February 2021	
31 December 2020	MF	(Nigeria)	Muhammed Usman	Hapoel Hadera		
31 December 2020	MF	(Turkmenistan)	Ruslan Mingazow	Caspiy	26 February 2021	
31 December 2020	FW	(Estonia)	Sergei Zenjov	Flora	20 January 2021	
31 December 2020	FW	(Ivory Coast)	Cédric Kouadio	Neman Grodno	23 February 2021	

=== Trial ===
Date From	Date To	Position	Nationality	Name	Last club	Ref.
January 2020		GK	(Kazakhstan)	Timur Zakirov	Bayterek	
January 2020		GK	(Armenia)	David Yurchenko	Yenisey Krasnoyarsk	
January 2020		DF	(Kazakhstan)	Aleksandr Kislitsyn	Okzhetpes	
January 2020		DF	(Kazakhstan)	Karam Sultanov	Kyzylzhar	
January 2020		MF	(Kazakhstan)	Adi Adambaev	Kairat Academy	
January 2020		FW	(Kazakhstan)	Pavel Kriventsev	Kyzylzhar	
January 2020		DF	(Belarus)	Andrey Lebedzew	Zhetysu	
January 2020		DF	(Cameroon)	Abdel Lamanje	Kaisar	
5 February 2020		FW	(Kazakhstan)	Magomed Paragulgov	Kairat	
5 February 2020		FW	(Kazakhstan)	Bauyrzhan Turysbek	Tobol	

== Friendlies ==
13 January 2020	Shakhter Karagandy (Kazakhstan)	3 – 2	(Germany) Carl Zeiss Jena	Belek, Turkey
20:00 (UTC+6)	Zenjov 3'; Shakhmetov 43'; K.Sultanov 61'	Report	Skenderović 8'; Pagliuca 84'

17 January 2020	Shakhter Karagandy (Kazakhstan)	4 – 3	(Bulgaria) Hebar Pazardzhik	Belek, Turkey
(UTC+6)	Zenjov; J.Payruz	Report	Goal

20 January 2020	Shakhter Karagandy (Kazakhstan)	0 – 1	(Romania) Astra Giurgiu	Belek, Turkey
(UTC+6)		Report	Goal

23 January 2020	Shakhter Karagandy (Kazakhstan)	1 – 1	(Serbia) Voždovac	Belek, Turkey
20:30 (UTC+6)	P.Kriventsev 4'	Report	Gjorgjievski 55'

25 January 2020	Shakhter Karagandy (Kazakhstan)	2 – 4	(Azerbaijan) Sumgayit	Belek, Turkey
(UTC+6)	J.Payruz; Shkodra	Report	Goal

8 February 2020	Shakhter Karagandy (Kazakhstan)	0 – 2	(Slovenia) Celje	Belek, Turkey
18:00 (UTC+6)		Report	Kerin 11'; G.Koritnik 78'

11 February 2020	Shakhter Karagandy (Kazakhstan)	1 – 2	(Russia) Nizhny Novgorod	Belek, Turkey
20:00 (UTC+6)		Report

15 February 2020	Shakhter Karagandy (Kazakhstan)	1 – 0	(Russia) SKA-Khabarovsk	Belek, Turkey
(UTC+6)	P.Kriventsev	Report

19 February 2020	Shakhter Karagandy (Kazakhstan)	2 – 1	(Russia) Novosibirsk	Belek, Turkey
(UTC+6)	Usman; Turysbek	Report	Goal

22 February 2020	Istiklol (Tajikistan)	1 – 0	(Kazakhstan) Shakhter Karagandy	Antalya, Turkey
18:30 (UTC+5)	I.Dzhalilov 50'; K.Dzhuraev (yellow card); A.Dzhalilov (yellow card); Davlatmir (yellow card); Milić (yellow card)	Report		Stadium: S&B Sport Sports Complex; Referee: Anton Lashuk

== Competitions ==
=== Premier League ===
==== Results summary ====
Overall								Home						Away					
Pld	W	D	L	GF	GA	GD	Pts	W	D	L	GF	GA	GD	W	D	L	GF	GA	GD
20	9	5	6	29	22	+7	32	5	2	3	11	8	+3	4	3	3	18	14	+4

Last updated: 30 November 2020.
Source: See Results

==== Results by round ====
Round	1	2	3	4	5	6	7	8	9	10	11	12	13	14	15	16	17	18	19	20	21	22
Ground	A	H	A	H	A	A	-	H	A	A	H	A	H	A	H	-	H	A	H	H	A	H
Result	L	W	W	L	W	D	-	D	D	L	W	D	L	L	D	-	W	W	W	L	W	W
Position	10	8	5	6	5	6	-	5	7	7	6	6	6	6	7	-	6	5	5	5	4	4

Source: See Results
A = Away; H = Home; W = Win; D = Draw; L = Loss

==== Results ====
7 March 2020 1	Tobol	3 – 1	Shakhter Karagandy	Kostanay
17:00 (UTC+6)	Murtazayev 17'; Miroshnichenko (yellow card) 33'; Yerlanov (yellow card) 73'; Nurgaliev 87' (yellow card) 90+4'; Zarandia 88'	Report	Manzorro (yellow card) 24'; Baah (yellow card) 35'; Buyvolov 56'; Kislitsyn (yellow card) 60'; Usman (yellow card) 90+4'	Stadium: Tobol Arena; Attendance: 3,000; Referee: Aydin Rakhimbayev

15 March 2020 2	Shakhter Karagandy	1 – 0	Kairat	Karaganda
17:00 (UTC+6)	Turysbek 17'; T.Zakirov (yellow card) 51'; Usman (yellow card) 79'	Report	Alip (yellow card) 84'	Stadium: Shakhter Stadium; Attendance: 0 Referee: Daniyar Sakhi
Note: Match played behind closed doors due to the COVID-19 pandemic.

1 July 2020 3	Ordabasy	0 – 1	Shakhter Karagandy	Shymkent
20:00 (UTC+6)	Diakate (red card) 74'	Report	Turysbek (yellow card) 30'; Manzorro (yellow card) 50' (yellow-red card) 80' (goal) 65'; Zenjov (yellow card) 74'; Yatchenko (yellow card) 90+2'	Stadium: Kazhymukan Munaitpasov Stadium; Attendance: 0 Referee: Georgiy Chekhovskiy
Note: Match originally scheduled for 21 March, but postponed on 16 March due to the COVID-19 pandemic.

19 August 2020 4	Shakhter Karagandy	0 – 1	Kaisar	Almaty
18:00 (UTC+6)	Takulov (yellow card) 23'; Bakayev (yellow card) 24'; Yurchenko (yellow card) 90+3'	Report	Graf (yellow card) 29'; Bitang (yellow card) 50'; Marochkin 67'; A.Zarutskiy (yellow card) 90+2'; Fedin (yellow card) 90+3'	Stadium: T.S.Segïzbaeva Academy Stadium; Attendance: 0 Referee: Denis Izmailov
Note: Match originally scheduled for 3 April and then 4 July, but postponed twice due to the COVID-19 pandemic. Match played at the T.S.Segïzbaeva Academy Stadium in Almaty, instead of Shakhter Karagandy's regular Shakhter Stadium in Karaganda. Match played behind closed doors due to the COVID-19 pandemic.

22 August 2020 5	Kyzylzhar	1 – 3	Shakhter Karagandy	Almaty
21:00 (UTC+6)	Delić (yellow card) 44'; Enache 78'	Report	Buyvolov 14'; Baah (yellow card) 19'; P.Kriventsev (yellow card) 28'; Mingazow (yellow card) 51'; Y.Tapalov (yellow card) 76'; Lamanje 85'; A.Tattybaev 90+3'	Stadium: Jas Qyran Stadium; Attendance: 0 Referee: Daniyar Sakhi
Note: Match originally scheduled for 11 April and then 10 July, but postponed twice due to the COVID-19 pandemic. Match played at the Jas Qyran stadium in Almaty, instead of Kyzylzhar's regular Karasai Stadium in Petropavl. Match played behind closed doors due to the COVID-19 pandemic.

29 August 2020 6	Okzhetpes	1 – 1	Shakhter Karagandy	Almaty
21:00 (UTC+6)	M.Tuliev (yellow card) 36'; Obradović (yellow card) 70' (goal) 87'; Moldakaraev (yellow card) 85'	Report	Baah 27'	Stadium: Jas Qyran Stadium; Attendance: 0 Referee: Ruslan Omarov
Note: Match played at the Jas Qyran Stadium in Almaty, instead of Okzhetpes's regular Okzhetpes Stadium in Kokshetau. Match played behind closed doors due to the COVID-19 pandemic.

11 September 2020 8	Shakhter Karagandy	1 – 1	Taraz	Almaty
21:00 (UTC+6)	Buyvolov (yellow card) 49'; Zenjov (yellow card) 68'; Usman 90+2'	Report	Karshakevich 50'; D.Babakhanov (yellow card) 85'	Stadium: Jas Qyran Stadium; Attendance: 0 Referee: Furkat Atajanow
Note: Match played at the Jas Qyran Stadium in Almaty, instead of Shakhter Karagandy's regular Shakhter Stadium in Karaganda. Match played behind closed doors due to the COVID-19 pandemic.

20 September 2020 9	Astana	1 – 1	Shakhter Karagandy	Almaty
15:00 (UTC+6)	Sotiriou 63'	Report	Usman (yellow card) 49'; A.Tattybaev 71'	Stadium: T.S.Segïzbaeva Academy Stadium; Attendance: 0 Referee: Igor Chesnokov
Note: Match played at the T.S.Segïzbaeva Academy Stadium in Almaty, instead of Astana's regular Astana Arena in Nur-Sultan. Match played behind closed doors due to the COVID-19 pandemic.

24 September 2020 10	Zhetysu	3 – 2	Shakhter Karagandy	Almaty
13:30 (UTC+6)	Živković (yellow card) 20'; Naumov (yellow card) 26'; Darabayev (yellow card) 42'; Kerimzhanov (yellow card) 64'; Zhaksylykov 70', 83' (yellow card) 85'; Eugénio 84' (yellow card) 85'; Zubovich (yellow card) 90+1'	Report	Usman (yellow card) 12'; Mingazow 25'; A.Tattybaev (yellow card) 43'; Khubulov (yellow card) 45'; Lamanje 53'; Tapalov (yellow card) 59'; Buyvolov (yellow card) 75'	Stadium: T.S.Segïzbaeva Academy Stadium; Attendance: 0 Referee: Anatolyi Vishnichenko
Note: Match played at the T.S.Segïzbaeva Academy Stadium in Almaty, instead of Zhetysu's regular Zhetysu Stadium in Taldıqorğan. Match played behind closed doors due to the COVID-19 pandemic.

28 September 2020 11	Shakhter Karagandy	2 – 1	Caspiy	Almaty
17:00 (UTC+6)	Baah 11' (yellow card) 51'; Khubulov (yellow card) 23'; Lamanje (yellow card) 45'; Tkachuk 87'	Report	R.Sakhalbaev (yellow card) 60'; B.Kabylan 82'	Stadium: Jas Qyran Stadium; Attendance: 0 Referee: Georgiy Chekhovskiy
Note: Match played at the Jas Qyran Stadium in Almaty, instead of Shakhter Karagandy's regular Shakhter Stadium in Karaganda. Match played behind closed doors due to the COVID-19 pandemic.

1 October 2020 12	Kairat	1 – 1	Shakhter Karagandy	Almaty
19:00 (UTC+6)	Vágner Love 64'; Dugalić (yellow card) 68'	Report	Baah (yellow card) 16'; Tkachuk (yellow card) 56'; A.Tattybaev 82'	Stadium: Central Stadium; Attendance: 0 Referee: Zhandos Abzhan
Note: Match played behind closed doors due to the COVID-19 pandemic.

18 October 2020 13	Shakhter Karagandy	0 – 1	Ordabasy	Almaty
14:00 (UTC+6)	Lamanje (yellow card) 68'	Report	João Paulo 74'; Dmitrenko (yellow card) 75'	Stadium: T.S.Segïzbaeva Academy Stadium; Attendance: 0 Referee: Bakhyt Kyzylbaev
Note: Match played at the T.S.Segïzbaeva Academy Stadium in Almaty, instead of Shakhter Karagandy's regular Shakhter Stadium in Karaganda. Match played behind closed doors due to the COVID-19 pandemic.

22 October 2020 14	Kaisar	2 – 0	Shakhter Karagandy	Almaty
14:00 (UTC+6)	Tagybergen (yellow card) 33' (goal) 36'; Lobjanidze 55'	Report	Lamanje (yellow card) 48'; Takulov (yellow card) 58'; Tkachuk (yellow card) 65'	Stadium: T.S.Segïzbaeva Academy Stadium; Attendance: 0 Referee: Denis Tevyashov
Note: Match played at the T.S.Segïzbaeva Academy Stadium in Almaty, instead of Kaisar's regular Gani Muratbayev Stadium in Kyzylorda. Match played behind closed doors due to the COVID-19 pandemic.

27 October 2020 15	Shakhter Karagandy	0 – 0	Kyzylzhar	Talgar
15:00 (UTC+6)	Tapalov (yellow card) 16'; Baah (yellow card) 59'; Bakayev (yellow card) 80'	Report	Ceesay (yellow card) 27'; B.Shaikhov (yellow card) 61'; Gubanov (yellow card) 63'	Stadium: UTB Talgar; Attendance: 0 Referee: Grigory Moskovchenko
Note: Match played at the UTB Talgar stadium in Talgar, instead of Ordabasy's regular Kazhymukan Munaitpasov Stadium in Shymkent. Match played behind closed doors due to the COVID-19 pandemic.

4 November 2020 17	Shakhter Karagandy	2 – 1	Okzhetpes	Almaty
13:00 (UTC+6)	Baah (yellow card) 40'; Zenjov 49', 57'; Tkachuk (yellow card) 73'; Takulov (yellow card) 81'; Usman (yellow card) 90+2'; Z.Payruz (yellow card) 90+3'	Report	Dmitrijev (yellow card) 27'; Stojanović 40'	Stadium: T.S.Segïzbaeva Academy Stadium; Attendance: 0 Referee: Timur Kumashev
Note: Match played at the T.S.Segïzbaeva Academy Stadium in Almaty, instead of Shakhter Karagandy's regular Shakhter Stadium in Karaganda. Match played behind closed doors due to the COVID-19 pandemic.

8 November 2020 18	Taraz	2 – 4	Shakhter Karagandy	Talgar
15:00 (UTC+6)	Nyuiadzi (red card) 3'; Brkić (yellow card) 3'; D.Evstingeyev (yellow card) 67'; A.Suley (yellow card) 69'; A.Zhumabek 73'; Silva 74'	Report	Khubulov 3' (pen.), 28'; Seisen 40' (o.g.); Zenjov (yellow card) 50'; Mingazow 58' (yellow card) 76'; Tkachuk (yellow card) 62'; Baah (yellow card) 90+3'	Stadium: UTB Talgar; Attendance: 0 Referee: Furkat Atajanov
Note: Match played at the UTB Talgar stadium in Talgar, instead of Taraz's regular Central Stadium in Taraz. Match played behind closed doors due to the COVID-19 pandemic.

21 November 2020 19	Shakhter Karagandy	3 – 1	Astana	Almaty
13:00 (UTC+6)	Mingazow 6' (yellow card) 18'; Zenjov 24'; Usman (yellow card) 43' (yellow-red card) 87'; Tapalov 79'	Report	Shomko (yellow card) 22'; Ebong (yellow card) 62'; Barseghyan (yellow card) 78'; Zhalmukan 90'	Stadium: Jas Qyran Stadium; Attendance: 0 Referee: Daniyar Sakhi
Note: Match played at the Jas Qyran Stadium in Almaty, instead of Shakhter Karagandy's regular Shakhter Stadium in Karaganda. Match played behind closed doors due to the COVID-19 pandemic.

24 November 2020 20	Shakhter Karagandy	1 – 2	Zhetysu	Almaty
18:00 (UTC+6)	A.Tattybaev 79'	Report	Toshev 24'; Mawutor (yellow card) 66'; Eugénio 74'	Stadium: Central Stadium; Attendance: 0 Referee: Bakhyt Kyzylbaev
Note: Match played at the Central Stadium in Almaty, instead of Shakhter Karagandy's regular Shakhter Stadium in Karaganda. Match played behind closed doors due to the COVID-19 pandemic.

27 November 2020 21	Caspiy	0 – 4	Shakhter Karagandy	Almaty
14:00 (UTC+6)	R.Rozybakiev (yellow card) 29'; R.Aslan (yellow card) 49'; R.Zhanysbaev (red card) 90+3'	Report	Khubulov 18', 38'; A.Tattybaev 26'; Usman (yellow card) 36'; E.Tapalov (yellow card) 42'; Buyvolov (yellow card) 60'; Z.Payruz 90'; Bakayev (yellow card) 90+3'	Stadium: Stadïon Akademïï T.S.Segïzbaeva; Attendance: 0 Referee: Furkat Atajanov
Note: Match played at the Stadïon Akademïï T.S.Segïzbaeva in Almaty, instead of Caspiy's regular Karasai Stadium in Petropavl. Match played behind closed doors due to the COVID-19 pandemic.

30 November 2020 22	Shakhter Karagandy	1 – 0	Tobol	Almaty
13:00 (UTC+6)	Baah (yellow card) 47' (yellow-red card) 54'; Tkachuk (yellow card) 75'; Khubulov 89' (pen.); Y.Tsuprikov (yellow card) 90+3'	Report	Abilgazy (yellow card) 45+1'; Muzhikov (yellow card) 88'; Kvekveskiri (yellow card) 90'	Stadium: Jas Qyran Stadium; Attendance: 0 Referee: Arman Ismuratov
Note: Match played at the Jas Qyran Stadium in Almaty, instead of Shakhter Karagandy's regular Shakhter Stadium in Karaganda. Match played behind closed doors due to the COVID-19 pandemic.

==== League table ====
Pos	Team	Pld	W	D	L	GF	GA	GD	Pts	Qualification or relegation
2	Tobol	20	12	2	6	26	16	+10	38	Qualification for the Europa Conference League second qualifying round
3	Astana	20	11	3	6	32	21	+11	36	Qualification for the Europa Conference League second qualifying round
4	Shakhter Karagandy	20	9	5	6	29	22	+7	32	Qualification for the Europa Conference League second qualifying round
5	Ordabasy	20	9	4	7	27	26	+1	31	
6	Zhetysu	20	9	1	10	27	28	−1	28	

Source: UEFA, Soccerway
Rules for classification: 1) Points; 2) Goal difference; 3) Matches won; 4) Goals scored; 5) Away goals scored; 6) Head-to-head points; 7) Head-to-head matches won; 8) Head-to-head goal difference; 9) Head-to-head goals scored; 10) Head-to-head away goals scored; 11) Draw.

=== Kazakhstan Cup ===
July 2020 Last 16	–
(UTC+6)

== Squad statistics ==
As of match played 30 November 2020

=== Appearances and goals ===
No.	Pos	Nat	Player	Total		Premier League		Kazakhstan Cup	
No.	Pos	Nat	Player	Apps	Goals	Apps	Goals	Apps	Goals
1	GK	(Armenia) ARM	David Yurchenko	7	0	7	0	0	0
2	DF	(Russia) RUS	Dmitri Yatchenko	16	0	11+5	0	0	0
3	DF	(Ukraine) UKR	Yevhen Tkachuk	11	1	10+1	1	0	0
4	DF	(Ghana) GHA	Gideon Baah	19	2	19	2	0	0
5	DF	(Russia) RUS	Soslan Takulov	16	0	14+2	0	0	0
8	MF	(Nigeria) NGR	Muhammed Usman	18	1	18	1	0	0
10	FW	(Kazakhstan) KAZ	Aydos Tattybaev	17	5	6+11	5	0	0
11	FW	(Estonia) EST	Sergei Zenjov	17	3	16+1	3	0	0
12	FW	(Ivory Coast) CIV	Cédric Kouadio	1	0	0+1	0	0	0
17	MF	(Kazakhstan) KAZ	Aslanbek Kakimov	5	0	1+4	0	0	0
20	MF	(Turkmenistan) TKM	Ruslan Mingazow	13	3	9+4	3	0	0
25	DF	(Russia) RUS	Andrey Buyvolov	19	2	19	2	0	0
26	MF	(Kazakhstan) KAZ	Erkin Tapalov	12	1	9+3	1	0	0
33	DF	(Cameroon) CMR	Abdel Lamanje	17	2	17	2	0	0
40	GK	(Kazakhstan) KAZ	Yegor Tsuprikov	7	0	7	0	0	0
47	MF	(Kazakhstan) KAZ	Pavel Kriventsev	19	0	11+8	0	0	0
50	MF	(Kazakhstan) KAZ	Tair Nurseitov	1	0	0+1	0	0	0
57	MF	(Kazakhstan) KAZ	Egor Alishauskas	1	0	0+1	0	0	0
70	FW	(Kazakhstan) KAZ	Jean-Ali Payruz	10	1	0+10	1	0	0
77	MF	(Kazakhstan) KAZ	Gevorg Najaryan	11	0	7+4	0	0	0
78	GK	(Kazakhstan) KAZ	Timurbek Zakirov	6	0	6	0	0	0
87	MF	(Russia) RUS	Mikhail Bakayev	17	0	11+6	0	0	0
88	MF	(Russia) RUS	Arsen Khubulov	19	5	15+4	5	0	0
Players away from Shakhter Karagandy on loan:
Players who left Shakhter Karagandy during the season:
5	DF	(Kazakhstan) KAZ	Aleksandr Kislitsyn	1	0	1	0	0	0
6	DF	(Nigeria) NGR	Aliyu Abubakar	1	0	0+1	0	0	0
7	MF	(France) FRA	Jérémy Manzorro	3	1	3	1	0	0
9	FW	(Kazakhstan) KAZ	Bauyrzhan Turysbek	3	1	3	1	0	0
10	MF	(Kazakhstan) KAZ	Yerkebulan Nurgaliyev	2	0	0+2	0	0	0

=== Goal scorers ===
Place	Position	Nation	Number	Name	Premier League	Kazakhstan Cup	Total
1	FW	(Kazakhstan)	10	Aydos Tattybaev	5	0	5
1	MF	(Russia)	88	Arsen Khubulov	5	0	5
3	MF	(Turkmenistan)	20	Ruslan Mingazow	3	0	3
3	FW	(Estonia)	11	Sergei Zenjov	3	0	3
5	DF	(Russia)	25	Andrey Buyvolov	2	0	2
5	DF	(Cameroon)	33	Abdel Lamanje	2	0	2
5	DF	(Ghana)	4	Gideon Baah	2	0	2
8	FW	(Kazakhstan)	9	Bauyrzhan Turysbek	1	0	1
8	MF	(France)	7	Jérémy Manzorro	1	0	1
8	MF	(Nigeria)	8	Muhammed Usman	1	0	1
8	DF	(Ukraine)	3	Yevhen Tkachuk	1	0	1
8	MF	(Kazakhstan)	26	Erkin Tapalov	1	0	1
8	FW	(Kazakhstan)	70	Jean-Ali Payruz	1	0	1
8				Own goal	1	0	1
				TOTALS	29	0	29

=== Clean sheet ===
Place	Position	Nation	Number	Name	Premier League	Kazakhstan Cup	Total
1	GK	(Kazakhstan)	40	Yegor Tsuprikov	3	0	3
2	GK	(Kazakhstan)	78	Timurbek Zakirov	1	0	1
2	GK	(Armenia)	1	David Yurchenko	1	0	1
				TOTALS	5	0	5

=== Disciplinary record ===
Number	Nation	Position	Name	Premier League		Kazakhstan Cup		Total	
Number	Nation	Position	Name	Yellow card	Red card	Yellow card	Red card	Yellow card	Red card
1	(Armenia)	GK	David Yurchenko	1	0	0	0	1	0
2	(Russia)	DF	Dmitri Yatchenko	1	0	0	0	1	0
3	(Ukraine)	DF	Yevhen Tkachuk	5	0	0	0	5	0
4	(Ghana)	DF	Gideon Baah	9	1	0	0	9	1
5	(Russia)	DF	Soslan Takulov	3	0	0	0	3	0
8	(Nigeria)	MF	Muhammed Usman	8	1	0	0	8	1
10	(Kazakhstan)	FW	Aydos Tattybaev	1	0	0	0	1	0
11	(Estonia)	FW	Sergei Zenjov	3	0	0	0	3	0
20	(Turkmenistan)	MF	Ruslan Mingazow	3	0	0	0	3	0
25	(Russia)	DF	Andrey Buyvolov	3	0	0	0	3	0
26	(Kazakhstan)	Erkin Tapalov	4	0	0	0	4	0	
33	(Cameroon)	DF	Abdel Lamanje	3	0	0	0	3	0
40	(Kazakhstan)	GK	Yegor Tsuprikov	1	0	0	0	1	0
47	(Kazakhstan)	MF	Pavel Kriventsev	1	0	0	0	1	0
70	(Kazakhstan)	FW	Jean-Ali Payruz	1	0	0	0	1	0
78	(Kazakhstan)	GK	Timurbek Zakirov	1	0	0	0	1	0
87	(Russia)	MF	Mikhail Bakayev	3	0	0	0	3	0
88	(Russia)	MF	Arsen Khubulov	2	0	0	0	2	0
Players away on loan:
Players who left Shakhter Karagandy during the season:
5	(Kazakhstan)	DF	Aleksandr Kislitsyn	1	0	0	0	1	0
7	(France)	MF	Jérémy Manzorro	3	1	0	0	3	1
9	(Kazakhstan)	FW	Bauyrzhan Turysbek	1	0	0	0	1	0
			TOTALS	58	3	0	0	58	3
