= Joseph Adah =

Nigerian footballer (born 1999)

Personal information
- Full name: Joseph Oma Adah
- Date of birth: 8 June 1999 (age 27)
- Place of birth: Abuja, Nigeria
- Height: 1.76 m (5 ft 9 in)
- Position: Winger

Youth career
- Amakson Academy

Senior career*
Years	Team	Apps	(Gls)
2017–2019	Katsina United		
2019	Slutsk	24	(1)
2020	Pyunik	6	(1)
2020	Gandzasar Kapan	8	(1)
2021	Shakhter Karagandy	0	(0)
2021	→ Shakhter-Bulat	1	(0)
2021–2022	Olimp-Dolgoprudny	21	(3)
2023	Dinamo Minsk	2	(0)
2023–2024	Sektzia Ness Ziona	27	(4)
2024	Slavia Mozyr	5	(0)
- * Club domestic league appearances and goals as of 5 December 2024

Joseph Oma Adah (born 8 June 1999) is a Nigerian professional footballer who plays as a winger.

== Career ==
On 25 January 2020, FC Pyunik announced the signing of Adah. He went on to make six appearances and scored one goal for Pyunik before his contract expired and he left the club.

On 25 February 2021, Adah signed for Shakhter Karagandy.

== Career statistics ==
=== Club ===
As of match played 5 March 2021

Appearances and goals by club, season and competition
Club	Season	League			National cup		Continental		Other		Total	
Club	Season	Division	Apps	Goals	Apps	Goals	Apps	Goals	Apps	Goals	Apps	Goals
Slutsk	2019	Belarusian Premier League	24	1	2	0	—		—		26	1
Pyunik	2019–20	Armenian Premier League	6	1	0	0	0	0	—		6	1
Gandzasar Kapan	2020–21	Armenian Premier League	8	1	1	0	—		—		9	1
Shakhter Karagandy	2021	Kazakhstan Premier League	0	0	0	0	0	0	1 (Note: Appearance in Kazakhstan Super Cup)	0	1	0
Career total			38	3	3	0	0	0	1	0	42	3
