= Cédric Khaleb Kouadio =

Ivorian footballer (born 1997)

Personal information
- Full name: Cédric Khaleb Kouadio
- Date of birth: 25 July 1997 (age 29)
- Place of birth: Abidjan, Ivory Coast
- Height: 1.74 m (5 ft 9 in)
- Position: Forward

Senior career*
| Years | Team | Apps | (Gls) |
| 2013–2017 | ES Bingerville | | |
| 2017 | Slovan Liberec | 0 | (0) |
| 2018 | Slutsk | 3 | (0) |
| 2018–2019 | Torpedo Minsk | 22 | (6) |
| 2019 | Slutsk | 8 | (1) |
| 2020 | Shakhter Karagandy | 1 | (0) |
| 2021–2022 | Neman Grodno | 25 | (5) |
| 2022–2023 | Dinamo Brest | 31 | (2) |
| 2025 | Vitebsk | 11 | (0) |

International career
| 2013 | Côte d'Ivoire U17 | | |
- * Club domestic league appearances and goals as of 6 April 2026

Cédric Kouadio (born 25 July 1997) is an Ivorian professional football forward.
