= Yevgeny Shikavka =

Belarusian footballer

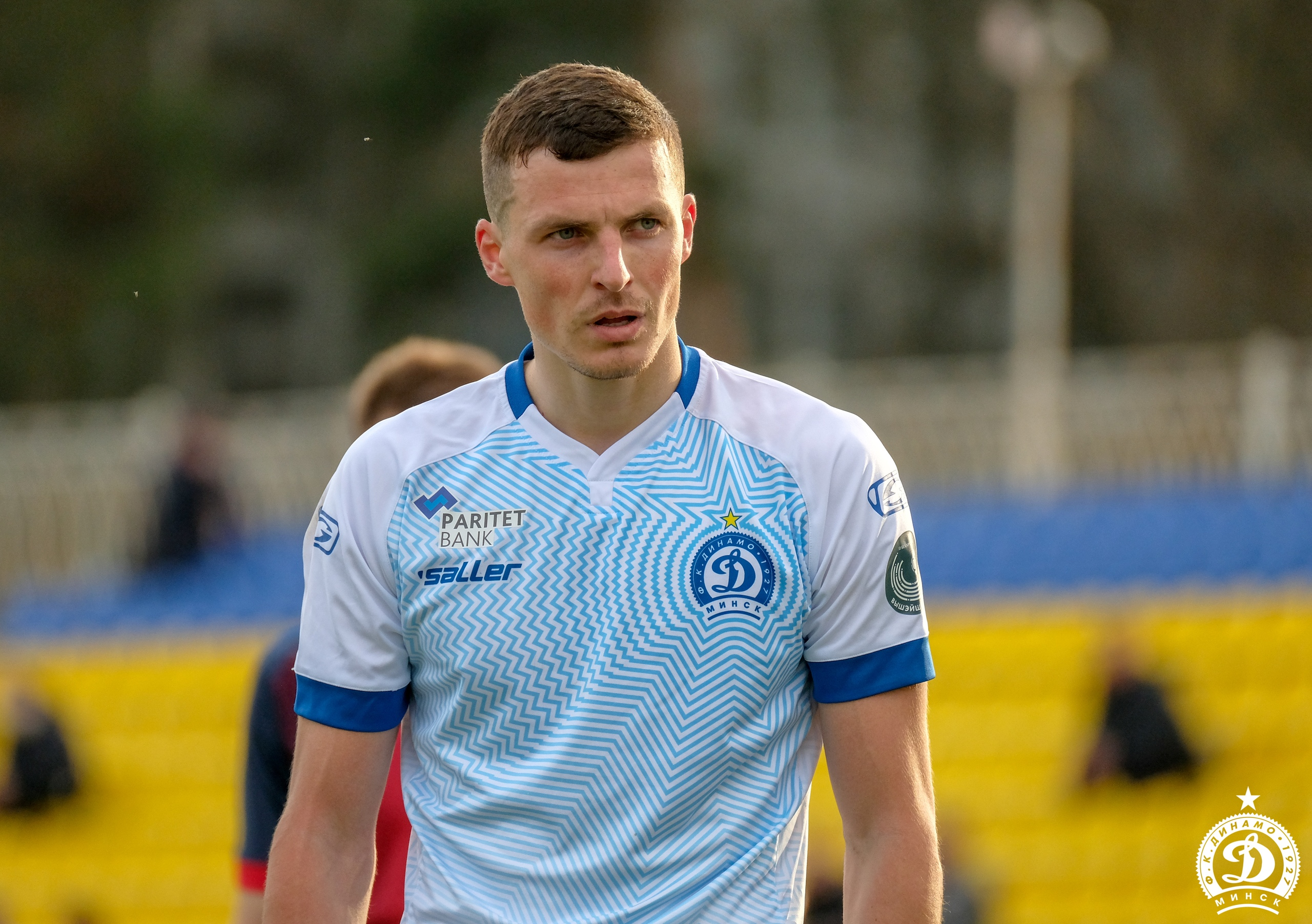
- Shikavka with Dinamo Minsk in 2020

Personal information
- Full name: Yevgeny Igorevich Shikavka
- Date of birth: 15 October 1992 (age 34)
- Place of birth: Minsk, Belarus
- Height: 1.85 m (6 ft 1 in)
- Position: Centre-forward

Team information
- Current team: Podbeskidzie
- Number: 9

Youth career
- 2007–2012: BATE Borisov

Senior career*
Years	Team	Apps	(Gls)
2012–2013	BATE Borisov	0	(0)
2012	→ Polotsk (loan)	8	(0)
2013	→ Slonim (loan)	25	(2)
2014	Slavia Mozyr	12	(0)
2014–2017	Krumkachy Minsk	82	(24)
2017–2018	Slutsk	43	(14)
2019	AEL	15	(1)
2020–2021	Dinamo Minsk	39	(11)
2021	Shakhter Karagandy	5	(1)
2022–2025	Korona Kielce	112	(21)
2025–2026	Zagłębie Sosnowiec	30	(10)
2026–	Podbeskidzie	0	(0)

International career^{‡}
2012	Belarus U21	3	(1)
2018–	Belarus	9	(1)
- * Club domestic league appearances and goals as of 09:37, 31 May 2026 (UTC) ‡ National team caps and goals as of 5 June 2025 (UTC)

Yevgeny Igorevich Shikavka (Belarusian: Яўген Ігаравіч Шыкаўка; Russian: Евгений Игоревич Шикавка; born 15 October 1992) is a Belarusian professional footballer who plays as a centre-forward for I liga club Podbeskidzie Bielsko-Biała and the Belarus national team.

== Career statistics ==
=== International ===
As of match played 5 June 2025

Appearances and goals by national team and year
National team	Year	Apps	Goals
Belarus
Belarus	2018	1	0
Belarus	2019	1	0
Belarus	2024	6	0
Belarus	2025	1	1
Total		9	1

Scores and results list Belarus' goal tally first, score column indicates score after each Shikavka goal.

List of international goals scored by Yevgeny Shikavka
No.	Date	Venue	Opponent	Score	Result	Competition
1	5 June 2025	Borisov Arena, Borisov, Belarus	Kazakhstan	4–1	4–1	Friendly

== Honours ==
Korona Kielce II

- IV liga Świętokrzyskie: 2023–24
