= Matvey Gerasimov =

Kazakhstani footballer

Personal information
- Full name: Matvey Vladimirovich Gerasimov
- Date of birth: 4 February 2001 (age 25)
- Place of birth: Karagandy, Kazakhstan
- Height: 1.91 m (6 ft 3 in)
- Position: Forward

Team information
- Current team: Turan
- Number: 17

Youth career
- 2017–2020: Shakhter Karagandy

Senior career*
Years	Team	Apps	(Gls)
2018–2020	Shakhter Karagandy	0	(0)
2018	→ Shakhter-Bolat Temirtau (loan)	1	(0)
2019	→ Shakhter-M Karagandy	57	(22)
2020–2021	Metalist Kharkiv	0	(0)
2021	→ Isloch Minsk Raion (loan)	2	(0)
2023–2024	Arsenal Dzerzhinsk	36	(14)
2025	Irtysh Pavlodar	20	(7)
2026–	Turan	20	(3)

International career
2019	Kazakhstan U19	3	(0)
- * Club domestic league appearances and goals as of 2 November 2026

Matvey Vladimirovich Gerasimov (Russian: Матвей Владимирович Герасимов; born 4 February 2001) is a Kazakhstani professional footballer who plays for Turan.
