= Ali Aliyev (footballer) =

Kazakhstani footballer

- Aliyev in 2008

Personal information
- Full name: Ali Khanaliuly Aliyev
- Date of birth: 27 October 1980 (age 45)
- Place of birth: Almaty, Kazakh SSR, Soviet Union
- Height: 1.75 m (5 ft 9 in)
- Position: Midfielder

Team information
- Current team: Kazakhstan (manager)

Youth career
- Kairat

Senior career*
Years	Team	Apps	(Gls)
1998–2006	Kairat	186	(18)
2007	Akçaabat Sebatspor	16	(5)
2007–2009	Kayseri Erciyesspor	43	(2)
2009–2010	Kartalspor	20	(0)
2010–2011	Diyarbakırspor	17	(0)
2012	Irtysh	4	(0)
2012	Tobol	2	(0)
2013	Vostok	29	(1)
2014	Ordabasy	0	(0)
2015–2019	Kyzylzhar	83	(6)
Total		400	(32)

International career
2002–2008	Kazakhstan	2	(0)

Managerial career
- 2019: Kyzylzhar
- 2021: Shakhter Karagandy
- 2021: Astana-Zhas
- 2022: Zhenis
- 2023–2025: Kyzylzhar
- 2025: Kazakhstan
- * Club domestic league appearances and goals

Ali Khanaliuly Aliyev (Kazakh: Әли Ханәлиұлы Әлиев, romanized: Äli Hanäliūly Äliev; born 27 October 1980) is a Kazakh football coach and a former player who was head coach of the Kazakhstan national football team in 2025.

== Career ==
=== Club ===
In March 2014, Aliyev joined FC Ordabasy as a player-coach.

=== Management ===
On 20 January 2021, Aliyev was appointed as head coach of Shakhter Karagandy.

From April 2022 to January 2023, he served as head coach of "Zhenis".

On 31 January 2025, he was named interim manager of the Kazakhstan national football team.

== Career statistics ==
Last update: 15 December 2014

Season	Team	Country	League	Level	Apps	Goals
1998	Kairat	Kazakhstan	Premier League	1	2	0
1999	Kairat	Kazakhstan	Premier League	1	21	1
2000	Kairat	Kazakhstan	Premier League	1	19	3
2001	Kairat	Kazakhstan	Premier League	1	27	3
2002	Kairat	Kazakhstan	Premier League	1	29	2
2003	Kairat	Kazakhstan	Premier League	1	30	5
2004	Kairat	Kazakhstan	Premier League	1	26	3
2005	Kairat	Kazakhstan	Premier League	1	17	1
2006	Kairat	Kazakhstan	Premier League	1	15	0
2006–07	Akçaabat Sebatspor	Turkey	League A	2	16	5
2007–08	Kayseri Erciyesspor	Turkey	League A	2	15	1
2008–09	Kayseri Erciyesspor	Turkey	League A	2	28	1
2009–10	Kartalspor	Turkey	League A	2	20	0
2010–11	Diyarbakirspor	Turkey	League A	2	1	0
2012	Irtysh	Kazakhstan	Premier League	1	4	0
2012	Tobol	Kazakhstan	Premier League	1	2	0
2013	FC Vostok	Kazakhstan	Premier League	1	29	1
2014	FC Ordabasy	Kazakhstan	Premier League	1	0	0

=== International ===
National Team	Year	Apps	Goals
Kazakhstan
Kazakhstan	2002	1	0
Kazakhstan	2003	0	0
Kazakhstan	2004	0	0
Kazakhstan	2005	0	0
Kazakhstan	2006	0	0
Kazakhstan	2007	0	0
Kazakhstan	2008	1	0
Total		2	0

Statistics accurate as of match played on 23 May 2008

== Honours ==
Kairat

- Kazakhstan Premier League: 2004
- Kazakhstan Cup: 2001, 2003
