= Aramis Kouzine =

Canadian soccer player

Personal information
- Full name: Aramis Nabil Kouzine
- Date of birth: October 3, 1998 (age 28)
- Place of birth: Markham, Ontario, Canada
- Height: 1.89 m (6 ft 2 in)
- Position: Forward

Team information
- Current team: AB Argir

College career
Years	Team	Apps	(Gls)
2016–2017	Penn Quakers	12	(1)

Senior career*
Years	Team	Apps	(Gls)
2017–2019	Obolon-Brovar Kyiv	26	(4)
2019	Dnipro-1	0	(0)
2020	AaB	0	(0)
2021	Shakhter Karagandy	1	(0)
2022	Hobro	0	(0)
2022	Thisted	8	(1)
2023	AB Argir	0	(0)
2024	Vianense	3	(0)
- * Club domestic league appearances and goals as of 14 September 2024

Aramis Nabil Kouzine (Ukrainian: Араміс Набіл Кузін; born 3 October 1998) is a Canadian professional soccer player who plays for Faroe Islands Premier League club AB Argir.

== Club career ==
=== FC Obolon-Brovar ===
Kouzine signed a contract with FC Obolon-Brovar in 2017 after a successful trial.

=== FC Dnipro-1 ===
In 2019, Kouzine joined FC Dnipro-1 on a free transfer, signing a one-year contract.

=== Aalborg BK ===
In 2020, Kouzine joined AaB, signing a short-term contract after a successful trial. On 28 May 2020 AaB confirmed, that Kouzine would leave the club at the end of his contract.

=== Later career ===
After a spell at Kazakhstani club Shakhter Karagandy, Kouzine returned to Denmark on 1 April 2022, after signing a deal for the rest of the season with Danish 1st Division club Hobro IK. He left Hobro at the end of the season, prior to joining Danish 2nd Division side Thisted FC on 12 July 2022. On 9 January 2022, Thisted's sporting director confirmed that Kouzine had moved to Faroe Islands Premier League club AB Argir.

== International career ==
Kouzine was named to the Canadian U-23 provisional roster for the 2020 CONCACAF Men's Olympic Qualifying Championship on February 26, 2020.
