= Aydos Tattybayev =

Kazakhstani footballer (born 1990)

Personal information
- Full name: Aydos Temirgaliuly Tattybayev
- Date of birth: 26 April 1990 (age 36)
- Place of birth: Karaganda, Kazakh SSR, Soviet Union
- Height: 1.86 m (6 ft 1 in)
- Position: Forward

Team information
- Current team: FC Shakhter Karagandy
- Number: 9

Senior career*
Years	Team	Apps	(Gls)
2009	FC Gefest	13	(5)
2010–2011	FC Shakhter Karagandy	18	(4)
2012–2013	FC Bolat	49	(14)
2014	FC Gefest	13	(5)
2015	FC Bolat	22	(7)
2016–2018	FC Shakhter Karagandy	46	(5)
2018	FC Taraz	12	(1)
2019–2020	FC Caspiy	25	(19)
2020–	FC Shakhter Karagandy	112	(22)

International career^{‡}
2021–	Kazakhstan	1	(0)
- * Club domestic league appearances and goals as of 2 November 2025 ‡ National team caps and goals as of 4 September 2021

Aydos Temirgaliuly Tattybayev (Kazakh: Айдос Темірғалиұлы Тәттібаев, Aidos Temırğaliūly Tättıbaev; born 26 April 1990) is a Kazakhstani professional footballer who plays for FC Shakhter Karagandy.

== International career ==
He made his debut for the Kazakhstan national football team on 4 September 2021 in a World Cup qualifier against Finland, a 0–1 away loss. He substituted Vladislav Vasilyev in the 63rd minute.
