= 2024 FC Elimai season =

FC Elimai
2024 season
- Chairman: Erlan Urazaev
- Manager: Andrey Karpovich
- Stadium: Spartak Stadium
- Premier League: 6th
- Kazakhstan Cup: Semi-finals vs Aktobe
- Top goalscorer: League: Nikita Korzun (7); All: Nikita Korzun (8)
- Highest home attendance: 8,500 vs Aktobe (16 June 2024)
- Lowest home attendance: 500 vs Kaisar (6 April 2024)
- Average home league attendance: 6,167 (20 October 2024)

The 2024 FC Elimai season was the 1st season that Elimai played back in the Kazakhstan Premier League, the highest tier of association football in Kazakhstan, following their relegation from the league in 2014.

== Squad ==
As of 6 October 2024

Note: Flags indicate national team as defined under FIFA eligibility rules; some limited exceptions apply. Players may hold more than one non-FIFA nationality.

No.	Pos.	Nation	Player
1	GK	KAZ	Rakhat Mavlikeev
3	DF	NGR	Samuel Odeyobo
4	DF	RUS	Daniil Penchikov
5	DF	KAZ	Sergey Keiler
7	FW	KAZ	Roman Murtazayev
8	MF	KAZ	Yuriy Pertsukh
9	FW	RUS	Islam Mashukov
10	MF	KAZ	Yerkebulan Nurgaliyev (captain)
11	FW	KAZ	Ivan Sviridov
12	MF	KAZ	Aslan Darabayev
15	DF	KAZ	Dmitriy Schmidt
18	DF	KAZ	Nursultan Sovetkazy
19	DF	KAZ	Mikhail Gabyshev

No.	Pos.	Nation	Player
20	FW	BRA	China
21	DF	KAZ	Sultan Abilgazy
22	FW	KAZ	Zhan-Ali Payruz
23	MF	BRA	Maicom David
24	MF	DOM	Edarlyn Reyes
35	GK	UKR	Maksym Koval
37	MF	KAZ	Meyrdzhan Zhumadilov
63	DF	BIH	Ivan Šaravanja
77	DF	KAZ	Dmitry Shomko
78	GK	RUS	Denis Kavlinov
81	MF	BLR	Nikita Korzun
88	DF	RUS	Dmitri Yashin
92	MF	FRA	Quentin Cornette

=== Out on loan ===
Note: Flags indicate national team as defined under FIFA eligibility rules; some limited exceptions apply. Players may hold more than one non-FIFA nationality.

No. / Pos. / Nation / Player; — / DF / KAZ / Bakytzhan Malikov (at Altai Oskemen until 31 December 2024)	No. / Pos. / Nation / Player; — / FW / KAZ / Arman Smailov (at Irtysh Pavlodar until 31 December 2024)

== Transfers ==
=== In ===
Date	Position	Nationality	Name	From	Fee	Ref.
1 January 2024	GK	(Russia)	Miroslav Lobantsev	Aktobe	Undisclosed	
1 January 2024	DF	(Belarus)	Nikolay Zolotov	Kolos Kovalivka	Undisclosed	
1 January 2024	DF	(Russia)	Dmitri Yashin	Aktobe	Undisclosed	
1 January 2024	MF	(Belarus)	Nikita Korzun	Shakhtyor Soligorsk	Undisclosed	
1 January 2024	MF	(Kazakhstan)	Yury Pertsukh	Shakhter Karagandy	Undisclosed	
1 January 2024	FW	(Brazil)	China	Aktobe	Undisclosed	
2 January 2024	FW	(Kazakhstan)	Roman Murtazayev	Shakhter Karagandy	Undisclosed	
10 January 2024	FW	(Kazakhstan)	Ivan Sviridov	Shakhter Karagandy	Undisclosed	
15 January 2024	DF	(Bosnia and Herzegovina)	Ivan Šaravanja	Široki Brijeg	Undisclosed	
23 January 2024	MF	(Kazakhstan)	Alen Aymanov	Kairat	Undisclosed	
27 January 2024	MF	(Brazil)	Maicom David	Džiugas Telšiai	Undisclosed	
11 February 2024	MF	(France)	Quentin Cornette	Volos	Undisclosed	
11 February 2024	FW	(Cameroon)	Robert Tambe	Jinan Xingzhou	Undisclosed	
15 February 2024	DF	(Kazakhstan)	Dmitry Shomko	Aktobe	Undisclosed	
5 March 2024	FW	(Senegal)	Sada Thioub	Unattached	Free	
28 June 2024	DF	(Russia)	Daniil Penchikov	Pari NN	Undisclosed	
3 July 2024	FW	(Russia)	Islam Mashukov	Alania Vladikavkaz	Undisclosed	
4 July 2024	MF	(Kazakhstan)	Aslan Darabayev	Unattached	Free	
5 July 2024	DF	(Nigeria)	Samuel Odeyobo	Hegelmann	Undisclosed	
8 July 2024	FW	(Dominican Republic)	Edarlyn Reyes	Al-Ittihad	Undisclosed	
30 July 2024	GK	(Ukraine)	Maksym Koval	Aris Thessaloniki	Undisclosed	

=== Out ===
Date	Position	Nationality	Name	To	Fee	Ref.
1 February 2024	FW	(Georgia (country))	Beka Kavtaradze	Melilla	Undisclosed	

=== Released ===
Date	Position	Nationality	Name	Joined	Date	Ref.
28 January 2024	MF	(Japan)	Takuya Matsunaga	PSBS Biak	1 July 2024	
20 June 2024	DF	(Russia)	Yegor Sorokin	Kairat	22 July 2024	
26 June 2024	FW	(Senegal)	Sada Thioub			
30 June 2024	MF	(Kazakhstan)	Mokhammed Yensebayev	Real Valladolid Promesas	1 July 2024	
3 July 2024	GK	(Russia)	Miroslav Lobantsev	Zhenis	30 July 2024	
3 July 2024	DF	(Belarus)	Nikolay Zolotov	Maxline Vitebsk		
3 July 2024	DF	(Kazakhstan)	Berik Aytbaev	Zhenis	9 July 2024	
3 July 2024	FW	(Cameroon)	Robert Tambe			
23 July 2024	MF	(Kazakhstan)	Alen Aymanov	Caspiy		

== Friendlies ==
2024	v
(UTC+5)

== Competitions ==
=== Overview ===
Competition	First match	Last match	Starting round	Final position	Record							
Competition	First match	Last match	Starting round	Final position	Pld	W	D	L	GF	GA	GD	Win %
Premier League	2 March 2024	10 November 2024	Matchday 1	6th	24	10	7	7	35	32	+3	41.67
Kazakhstan Cup	14 April 2024	19 June 2024	Round of 16	Semi-final	4	3	0	1	5	4	+1	75.00
League Cup	26 May 2024	25 September 2024	Group stage	Semi-final	7	2	3	2	8	2	+6	28.57
Total					35	15	10	10	48	38	+10	42.86

Last updated: 10 November 2024
Source: Competitions

=== Premier League ===
==== Results summary ====
Overall								Home						Away					
Pld	W	D	L	GF	GA	GD	Pts	W	D	L	GF	GA	GD	W	D	L	GF	GA	GD
24	10	7	7	35	32	+3	37	6	5	1	19	11	+8	4	2	6	16	21	−5

Last updated: 10 November 2024.
Source: See Results

==== Results by round ====
Round	1	2	3	4	5^{1}	6	7	8	9	10	11	12	13	14	15	16	17	18	19	20	21	22	23	24	25^{1}	26
Ground	H	A	A	H	A	H	A	H	H	A	H	A	H	A	H	A	H	H	A	H	A	A	H	A	H	A
Result	D	L	W	W	P	D	W	W	D	D	D	D	D	L	W	L	W	W	W	W	W	L	L	L	P	L
Position	7	9	8	6	7	7	4	2	2	2	4	4	5	5	4	4	4	4	3	3	1	3	5	5	6	6

Source: See Results
A = Away; H = Home; W = Win; D = Draw; L = Loss; P = Bye
Notes:
- ^{1} Elimai had a bye during the fifth and twenty-fifth round of fixtures.

==== Results ====
2 March 2024 1	Elimai	0–0	Atyrau	Semey
14:00 (UTC+5)	Korzun (yellow card) 25'; Maicom (yellow card) 52'; Nurgaliyev (yellow card) 90+1'	Report	Kerimzhanov (yellow card) 72'; Zhumakhanov (yellow card) 75'; Najaryan (yellow card) 90+1'	Stadium: Spartak Stadium; Attendance: 700; Referee: Daniyar Sakhi

6 March 2024 2	Tobol	4–2	Elimai	Kostanay
19:30 (UTC+5)	Henen (yellow card) 22'; Ivanović 26' (yellow card) 51'; Shakhov 30'; Gabarayev (yellow card) 51'; Tapalov (yellow card) 68' (goal) 90+1'; Cooper 72'	Report	Tambe 2'; China (yellow card) 22' (goal) 53' (pen.); Shomko (yellow card) 51'; Šaravanja (red card) 62'	Stadium: Central Stadium; Attendance: 2,600; Referee: Bulat Sariev

31 March 2024 3	Astana	0–1	Elimai	Almaty
16:30 (UTC+5)	Amanović (red card) 59'; Camara (yellow card) 74'	Report	Yashin (yellow card) 25'; Schmidt (yellow card) 34'; Cornette (yellow card) 67'; Korzun (yellow card) 70'; Murtazayev 88'; Nurgaliyev (yellow card) 90+7'; Pertsukh (yellow card) 90+8'	Stadium: Khan Taniri Stadium; Referee: Artem Kuchin

6 April 2024 4	Elimai	1–0	Kaisar	Semey
16:30 (UTC+5)	Korzun (yellow card) 45+1'; China 80' (yellow card) 87'	Report	Baradzin (yellow card) 59'; Zhangylyshbay (yellow card) 79'; Pajović (yellow card) 87'; Kalmuratov (yellow card) 90+4'; Sicaci (yellow card) 90+4'	Stadium: Spartak Stadium; Attendance: 500; Referee: Sayat Karabaev

5	Aksu	BYE	Elimai	Pavlodar
(UTC+5)				Stadium: Central Stadium

28 April 2024 6	Elimai	1–1	Ordabasy	Semey
14:00 (UTC+5)	Thioub 3'; Keiler (yellow card) 22'; Schmidt (yellow card) 90'	Report	Darboe 13'; Makarenko (yellow card) 90'	Stadium: Spartak Stadium; Attendance: 8,000; Referee: Saken Baimbet

4 May 2024 7	Zhenis	1–2	Elimai	Karaganda
14:00 (UTC+5)	Zhunusov (yellow card) 9' (red card) 40'; Manaj (yellow card) 43'; Sovet (yellow card) 45+3'; Rom (yellow card) 86'; Zulfiu 90+2'	Report	Cornette 61'; Nurgaliyev (yellow card) 67'; Pertsukh 77'	Stadium: Shakhter Stadium; Attendance: 200; Referee: Rustam Omarov

12 May 2024 8	Elimai	2–1	Shakhter Karagandy	Semey
17:00 (UTC+5)	Murtazayev 38'; Korzun 90+7'	Report	Tolordava (yellow card) 9'; Tyulyubay (yellow card) 40'; Stamenković (yellow card) 74'; Nazymkhanov 88'; Tsuprikov (yellow card) 90+6'	Stadium: Spartak Stadium; Referee: Daniyar Sakhi

19 May 2024 9	Elimai	1–1	Kairat	Semey
21:00 (UTC+5)	Korzun (yellow card) 12'; David (yellow card) 68'; Pertsukh 90+5'	Report	Zaria (yellow card) 35'; João Paulo 55' (yellow card) 58'; Arad (yellow card) 79'; Shvyryov (yellow card) 90+1'	Stadium: Spartak Stadium; Attendance: 8,000; Referee: Bulat Sariev

2 June 2024 10	Kyzylzhar	1–1	Elimai	Petropavl
19:00 (UTC+5)	Cmiljanić (yellow card) 30'; Bushman 63'	Report	Nurgaliyev 73'; Sviridov (yellow card) 82'	Stadium: Karasai Stadium; Attendance: 4,000; Referee: Baghdad Abdullayev

16 June 2024 11	Elimai	2–2	Aktobe	Semey
20:00 (UTC+5)	Korzun (yellow card) 45' (goal) 45+2'; David (yellow card) 60' (goal) 86'; Thioub (yellow card) 89'	Report	Jean 25'; Baytana (yellow card) 49'; Doumbouya (yellow card) 52'; Orazov (yellow card) 65'; Samorodov 78'	Stadium: Spartak Stadium; Attendance: 8,500; Referee: Sergey Nozhenko

23 June 2024 12	Turan	2–2	Elimai	Turkistan
20:00 (UTC+5)	Arkhipov (yellow card) 41'; Jakoliš 44'; Nikolić (red card) 61'; Cuckić (yellow card) 81'; Dmitrijev (yellow card) 90+9'	Report	Aytbaev (yellow card) 26'; Yashin 33' (yellow card) 63'; Keiler 46'; Payruz (yellow card) 50'; Tambe (yellow card) 87'; Aymanov (yellow card) 90+9'	Stadium: Turkistan Arena; Attendance: 200; Referee: Sayat Sulikanov

30 June 2024 13	Elimai	1–1	Zhetysu	Semey
18:00 (UTC+5)	Tambe (yellow card) 26'; Sviridov 62'	Report	Baltabekov 54'; Braga (yellow card) 90'	Stadium: Spartak Stadium; Attendance: 6,300; Referee: Grigory Moskovchenko

13 July 2024 14	Kaisar	2–1	Elimai	Kyzylorda
20:00 (UTC+5)	Zhaksylykov 55' (pen.); Zhangylyshbay (red card) 63'; Milojko 90+5' (yellow card) 90+6'	Report	China 13' (yellow card) FT; Payruz (yellow card) 46'; Yashin (yellow card) 55'	Stadium: Gani Muratbayev Stadium; Attendance: 2,000; Referee: Bulat Sariev

27 July 2024 15	Elimai	1–0	Zhenis	Semey
20:00 (UTC+5)	Korzun 71'	Report	Adílio (yellow card) 29'; Aytbaev (yellow card) 32'; Anarbekov (yellow card) 54'; Oliveira (yellow card) 66'	Stadium: Spartak Stadium; Attendance: 6,000; Referee: Rustam Omarov

3 August 2024 16	Kairat	4–1	Elimai	Almaty
20:00 (UTC+5)	Martynovich 3'; Gadrani 14'; Zaria (yellow card) 32'; Ulshin 51' (yellow card) 90+2'; Sorokin 65'; Santana (yellow card) 70'; Arad (yellow card) 83'	Report	Shomko (yellow card) 53'; Payruz 80'; Darabayev (yellow card) 81'	Stadium: Central Stadium; Attendance: 11,239; Referee: Denis Tevyashov

17 August 2024 17	Elimai	6–0	Turan	Semey
20:00 (UTC+5)	Reyes 15', 48'; Korzun 18'; Darabayev (yellow card) 20'; Mashukov 26'; China (yellow card) 65' (goal) 72'; Sviridov 86'	Report	Arkhipov (yellow card) 6'; Vaganov (yellow card) 53'; Nikolić (yellow card) 79'	Stadium: Spartak Stadium; Attendance: 6,000; Referee: Aydin Tasybaev

24 August 2024 18	Elimai	2–1	Kyzylzhar	Semey
18:00 (UTC+5)	Korzun (yellow card) 31'; Sviridov 52'; Murtazayev 77'; Payruz (yellow card) 90+5'	Report	Saulet (yellow card) 18'; Imnadze 45' (yellow card) 87'; Beryozkin (yellow card) 67'; Sabino (yellow card) 71'; Zhaksybaev (yellow card) 77'	Stadium: Spartak Stadium; Attendance: 6,500; Referee: Sergey Nozhenko

31 August 2024 19	Aktobe	1–3	Elimai	Aktobe
20:00 (UTC+5)	Kasym 3' (pen.) (yellow card) 31'; Romero (yellow card) 18'; Vătăjelu (yellow card) 24'	Report	Odeyobo 31'; Korzun (yellow card) 40'; Penchikov (yellow card) 41'; Darabayev 53' (yellow card) 72'; Pertsukh (yellow card) 90'; Murtazayev 90+4'	Stadium: Central Stadium; Attendance: 12,600; Referee: Sayat Karabaev

15 September 2024 20	Elimai	2–1	Tobol	Semey
17:00 (UTC+5)	Mashukov 10'; Payruz (yellow card) 67'; Korzun 89'	Report	Ndiaye (yellow card) 51'; Chesnokov 90+4'	Stadium: Spartak Stadium; Attendance: 7,500; Referee: Bulat Sariev

22 September 2024 21	Shakhter Karagandy	1–2	Elimai	Karaganda
17:00 (UTC+5)	Cañas (yellow card) 90+2'; Kozlov 90+4'	Report	Korzun 15', 29'; Odeyobo (yellow card) 90+2'	Stadium: Shakhter Stadium; Attendance: 3,000; Referee: Rustam Omarov

3 October 2024 22	Zhetysu	2–0	Elimai	Taldykorgan
16:00 (UTC+5)	Muzhikov 24' (pen.); Charleston (yellow card) 45+3'; Kuchinsky (yellow card) 67'; Chogadze 84'	Report		Stadium: Zhetysu Stadium; Attendance: 2,000; Referee: Grigory Moskovchenko

20 October 2024 23	Elimai	0–3	Astana	Semey
16:00 (UTC+5)	Cornette (yellow card) 90'; Yashin (yellow card) 90+3'	Report	Camara 33'; Tomasov 37'; Karimov 82'; Amanović (yellow card) 88'	Stadium: Spartak Stadium; Attendance: 8,000; Referee: Rustam Omarov

26 October 2024 24	Atyrau	1–0	Elimai	Atyrau
16:00 (UTC+5)	Adil (yellow card) 5'; Novak (yellow card) 43'; Stasevich (yellow card) 45+3'; Kaldybekov (yellow card) 78'; Signevich 85'	Report	Reyes (yellow card) 23'; Payruz (yellow card) 56'; Shomko (yellow card) 83'	Stadium: Munaishy Stadium; Attendance: 1,500; Referee: Sergey Nozhenko

25	Elimai	Bye	Aksu	Semey
(UTC+5)				Stadium: Spartak Stadium

10 November 2024 26	Ordabasy	2–1	Elimai	Shymkent
14:00 (UTC+5)	Yerlanov (yellow card) 25' (goal) 58'; Plastun 34'; Astanov (yellow card) 54'	Report	David (yellow card) 36'; Sviridov 78'; Korzun (yellow card) 80'	Stadium: Kazhymukan Munaitpasov Stadium; Attendance: 3,000; Referee: Grigory Moskovchenko

==== League table ====
Pos	Team	Pld	W	D	L	GF	GA	GD	Pts	Qualification or relegation
4	Ordabasy	24	12	6	6	36	24	+12	42	Qualification for the Conference League first qualifying round
5	Tobol	24	11	6	7	33	23	+10	39	
6	Elimai	24	10	7	7	35	32	+3	37	
7	Atyrau	24	9	8	7	28	20	+8	35	
8	Kaisar	24	9	7	8	28	29	−1	34	

Source: UEFA, Soccerway, QFL
Rules for classification: 1) Points; 2) Goal difference; 3) Matches won; 4) Goals scored; 5) Away goals scored; 6) Head-to-head points; 7) Head-to-head matches won; 8) Head-to-head goal difference; 9) Head-to-head goals scored; 10) Head-to-head away goals scored; 11) Draw.

=== Kazakhstan Cup ===
14 April 2024 Round of 16	Elimai	2–1	Shakhter Karagandy	Semey
16:00 (UTC+5)	China 50'; Sviridov 89'	Report	Stamenković (yellow card) 30'; Savkiv (yellow card) 56'; Bachek 73'; Alishauskas (yellow card) 86'	Stadium: Spartak Stadium; Attendance: 250; Referee: Daniyar Sakhi

8 May 2024 Quarter-final	Elimai	1–0	Kyzylzhar	Semey
20:00 (UTC+5)	Korzun (yellow card) 51' (goal) 81'	Report	Nižić (yellow card) 34'; Abzalov (yellow card) 80'; Van Den Bogaert (yellow card) 90+1'	Stadium: Spartak Stadium; Attendance: 8,000; Referee: Georgy Chekhovsky

29 May 2024 Semifinal 1st leg	Aktobe	2–0	Elimai	Aktobe
20:00 (UTC+5)	Agbo (yellow card) 23'; Romero 25'; Samorodov 33'	Report	Shomko (yellow card) 55'	Stadium: Central Stadium; Attendance: 12,600; Referee: Bulat Sariev

19 June 2024 Semifinal 2nd leg	Elimai	2–1 (2–3 agg.)	Aktobe	Semey
20:00 (UTC+5)	Nurgaliyev (yellow card) 35'; Murtazayev 51'; Shomko 59'; Cornette (yellow card) 78'; Payruz (yellow card) 88'	Report	Samorodov 37'; Kiki (yellow card) 53' (red card) 58'; Kairov (yellow card) 79'; Jean (yellow card) 86'; Orazov (yellow card) 90+1'; Tanzharikov (yellow card) 90+2'; Shatsky (yellow card) 90+7'	Stadium: Spartak Stadium; Attendance: 8,500; Referee: Baghdad Abdullayev

=== League Cup ===
==== Group stage ====
Pos	Team	Pld	W	D	L	GF	GA	GD	Pts	Qualification
1	Elimai	3	2	1	0	8	2	+6	7	Advanced to Semifinals
2	Atyrau	3	1	1	1	2	3	−1	4	
3	Ordabasy	3	0	3	0	4	4	0	3	
4	Turan	3	0	1	2	2	7	−5	1	

Updated to match(es) played on 20 July 2024. Source:

25 May 2024 1	Elimai	3–0	Turan	Semey
20:00 (UTC+5)	Šaravanja (yellow card) 17'; Sviridov 20'; Payruz 55'; Thioub 82' (yellow card) 90+1'	Report	Dmitrijev (yellow card) 23'; Arkhipov (yellow card) 33' (yellow-red card) 33'; Sokolenko (yellow card) 90+1'	Stadium: Spartak Stadium; Attendance: 8,000; Referee: Arman Ismuratov

6 July 2024 2	Ordabasy	2–2	Elimai	Shymkent
20:00 (UTC+5)	Tungyshbayev (yellow card) 55'; Plastun (yellow card) 70'; Tursynbay 72', 88'; Malyi (yellow card) 74'	Report	China (yellow card) 41'; Nurgaliyev 54'; Payruz (yellow card) 65' (goal) 79'	Stadium: Kazhymukan Munaitpasov Stadium; Attendance: 8,000; Referee: Sayat Karabaev

20 July 2024 3	Elimai	3–0	Atyrau	Semey
20:00 (UTC+5)	Šaravanja (yellow card) 48'; Payruz 63'; China 85' (pen.) (yellow card) 90+7'; Penchikov 90+3'	Report	Oralbay (yellow card) 32'; Noyok (yellow card) 50'; Takulov (yellow card) 54'; Stepanov (yellow card) 90+7'	Stadium: Spartak Stadium; Attendance: 6,500; Referee: Daniyar Sakhi

==== Knockout stage ====
11 August 2024 Semifinal 1st leg	Elimai	0–0	Astana	Semey
20:00 (UTC+5)	Yashin (red card) 70'; Shomko (yellow card) 90+2'	Report		Stadium: Spartak Stadium; Attendance: 7,000; Referee: Denis Izmailov

25 September 2024 Semifinal 2nd leg	Astana	0–0 (a.e.t.) (0–0 agg.) (3–1 p)	Elimai	Astana
19:00 (UTC+5)	Bystrov (yellow card) 69'; Osei (yellow card) 84'; Kalaica (yellow card) 102'	Report	Pertsukh (red card) 105'	Stadium: Astana Arena; Attendance: 800; Referee: Ruslan Sultangaliev
	Penalties
	Karimov (penalty scored); Astanov (penalty scored); Amanović (penalty missed); Kalaica (penalty scored)		(penalty missed) China; (penalty missed) Darabayev; (penalty missed) Mashukov; (penalty scored) Reyes

== Squad statistics ==
As of match played 10 November 2024

=== Appearances and goals ===
No.	Pos	Nat	Player	Total		Premier League		Kazakhstan Cup		League Cup	
No.	Pos	Nat	Player	Apps	Goals	Apps	Goals	Apps	Goals	Apps	Goals
1	GK	(Kazakhstan) KAZ	Rakhat Mavlikeev	2	0	0+1	0	0	0	1	0
3	DF	(Nigeria) NGR	Samuel Odeyobo	14	1	12	1	0	0	2	0
4	DF	(Russia) RUS	Daniil Penchikov	15	1	11	0	0	0	3+1	1
5	DF	(Kazakhstan) KAZ	Sergey Keiler	16	1	8+4	1	1+2	0	1	0
7	FW	(Kazakhstan) KAZ	Roman Murtazayev	27	5	5+14	4	2+2	1	1+3	0
8	MF	(Kazakhstan) KAZ	Yury Pertsukh	22	2	5+9	2	2+2	0	3+1	0
9	FW	(Russia) RUS	Islam Mashukov	15	2	11+1	2	0	0	2+1	0
10	MF	(Kazakhstan) KAZ	Yerkebulan Nurgaliyev	24	2	9+9	1	1+1	0	2+2	1
11	FW	(Kazakhstan) KAZ	Ivan Sviridov	33	6	4+20	4	1+3	1	3+2	1
12	MF	(Kazakhstan) KAZ	Aslan Darabayev	14	1	8+3	1	0	0	1+2	0
15	DF	(Kazakhstan) KAZ	Dmitriy Schmidt	14	0	3+6	0	1+1	0	2+1	0
19	DF	(Kazakhstan) KAZ	Mikhail Gabyshev	17	0	10+2	0	2+1	0	1+1	0
20	FW	(Brazil) BRA	China	27	6	19+2	4	3	1	2+1	1
22	FW	(Kazakhstan) KAZ	Zhan-Ali Payruz	24	4	4+12	1	1+2	0	4+1	3
23	MF	(Brazil) BRA	Maicom David	33	1	24	1	2+2	0	3+2	0
24	MF	(Dominican Republic) DOM	Edarlyn Reyes	15	2	11+1	2	0	0	1+2	0
35	GK	(Ukraine) UKR	Maksym Koval	10	0	9	0	0	0	1	0
37	MF	(Kazakhstan) KAZ	Meyrdzhan Zhumadilov	1	0	0	0	0	0	0+1	0
63	DF	(Bosnia and Herzegovina) BIH	Ivan Šaravanja	14	0	8+1	0	1	0	4	0
77	DF	(Kazakhstan) KAZ	Dmitry Shomko	25	1	13+4	0	3	1	5	0
78	GK	(Russia) RUS	Denis Kavlinov	15	0	10	0	2	0	3	0
81	MF	(Belarus) BLR	Nikita Korzun	28	8	21+1	7	3	1	3	0
88	DF	(Russia) RUS	Dmitri Yashin	25	1	20	1	2	0	2+1	0
92	MF	(France) FRA	Quentin Cornette	19	1	7+6	1	3	0	3	0
Players away from Elimai on loan:
Players who left Elimai during the season:
9	FW	(Senegal) SEN	Sada Thioub	15	2	5+5	1	4	0	1	1
17	DF	(Kazakhstan) KAZ	Berik Aytbaev	5	0	2+1	0	1	0	1	0
29	FW	(Cameroon) CMR	Robert Ndip Tambe	15	1	9+3	1	2+1	0	0	0
35	DF	(Belarus) BLR	Nikolay Zolotov	8	0	3+2	0	1+1	0	1	0
41	GK	(Russia) RUS	Miroslav Lobantsev	8	0	5+1	0	2	0	0	0
80	DF	(Russia) RUS	Yegor Sorokin	12	0	8	0	4	0	0	0
99	FW	(Kazakhstan) KAZ	Alen Aymanov	3	0	0+1	0	0	0	0+2	0

=== Goal scorers ===
Place	Position	Nation	Number	Name	Premier League	Kazakhstan Cup	League Cup	Total
1	MF	(Belarus)	81	Nikita Korzun	7	1	0	8
2	FW	(Brazil)	20	China	4	1	1	6
2	FW	(Kazakhstan)	11	Ivan Sviridov	4	1	1	6
4	FW	(Kazakhstan)	7	Roman Murtazayev	4	1	0	5
5	FW	(Kazakhstan)	22	Zhan-Ali Payruz	1	0	3	4
6	MF	(Dominican Republic)	24	Edarlyn Reyes	2	0	0	2
6	MF	(Kazakhstan)	8	Yury Pertsukh	2	0	0	2
6	FW	(Russia)	9	Islam Mashukov	2	0	0	2
6	MF	(Senegal)	9	Sada Thioub	1	0	1	2
6	MF	(Kazakhstan)	10	Yerkebulan Nurgaliyev	1	0	1	2
11	DF	(Kazakhstan)	5	Sergey Keiler	1	0	0	1
11	DF	(Nigeria)	3	Samuel Odeyobo	1	0	0	1
11	DF	(Russia)	88	Dmitri Yashin	1	0	0	1
11	MF	(France)	92	Quentin Cornette	1	0	0	1
11	MF	(Kazakhstan)	12	Aslan Darabayev	1	0	0	1
11	MF	(Brazil)	23	Maicom David	1	0	0	1
11	FW	(Cameroon)	29	Robert Ndip Tambe	1	0	0	1
11	DF	(Kazakhstan)	77	Dmitry Shomko	0	1	0	1
11	DF	(Russia)	4	Daniil Penchikov	0	0	1	1
				TOTALS	35	5	8	48

=== Clean sheets ===
Place	Position	Nation	Number	Name	Premier League	Kazakhstan Cup	League Cup	Total
1	GK	(Russia)	78	Denis Kavlinov	3	0	2	5
2	GK	(Russia)	41	Miroslav Lobantsev	1	1	0	2
2	GK	(Ukraine)	35	Maksym Koval	1	0	1	2
4	GK	(Kazakhstan)	1	Rakhat Mavlikeev	0	0	1	1
				TOTALS	5	1	4	10

=== Disciplinary record ===
Number	Nation	Position	Name	Premier League		Kazakhstan Cup		League Cup		Total	
Number	Nation	Position	Name	Booked	Sent off (straight red)	Booked	Sent off (straight red)	Booked	Sent off (straight red)	Booked	Sent off (straight red)
3	(Nigeria)	DF	Samuel Odeyobo	1	0	0	0	0	0	1	0
4	(Russia)	DF	Daniil Penchikov	1	0	0	0	0	0	1	0
5	(Kazakhstan)	DF	Sergey Keiler	1	0	0	0	0	0	1	0
8	(Kazakhstan)	MF	Yury Pertsukh	2	0	0	0	0	1	0	1
10	(Kazakhstan)	MF	Yerkebulan Nurgaliyev	3	0	1	0	0	0	4	0
11	(Kazakhstan)	FW	Ivan Sviridov	1	0	0	0	0	0	1	0
12	(Kazakhstan)	MF	Aslan Darabayev	3	0	0	0	0	0	3	0
15	(Kazakhstan)	DF	Dmitriy Schmidt	2	0	0	0	0	0	2	0
20	(Brazil)	FW	China	4	0	0	0	2	0	6	0
22	(Kazakhstan)	FW	Zhan-Ali Payruz	5	0	1	0	1	0	7	0
23	(Brazil)	MF	Maicom David	4	0	0	0	0	0	4	0
24	(Dominican Republic)	MF	Edarlyn Reyes	1	0	0	0	0	0	1	0
63	(Bosnia and Herzegovina)	DF	Ivan Šaravanja	0	1	0	0	2	0	2	1
77	(Kazakhstan)	DF	Dmitry Shomko	3	0	1	0	1	0	5	0
81	(Belarus)	MF	Nikita Korzun	8	0	1	0	0	0	9	0
88	(Russia)	DF	Dmitri Yashin	4	0	0	0	0	1	4	1
92	(France)	MF	Quentin Cornette	2	0	1	0	0	0	3	0
99	(Kazakhstan)	FW	Alen Aymanov	1	0	0	0	0	0	1	0
Players away on loan:
Players who left Shakhter Karagandy during the season:
9	(Senegal)	FW	Sada Thioub	1	0	0	0	1	0	1	0
17	(Kazakhstan)	DF	Berik Aytbaev	1	0	0	0	0	0	1	0
29	(Cameroon)	FW	Robert Ndip Tambe	2	0	0	0	0	0	2	0
			TOTALS	48	1	5	0	7	2	60	3
