= 2024 FC Astana season =

FC Astana
2024 season
- Chairman: Sayan Khamitzhanov
- Manager: Grigori Babayan
- Stadium: Astana Arena (Renovation); Khan Taniri Stadium
- Premier League: 2nd
- Kazakhstan Cup: Quarter-finals vs Tobol
- League Cup: Winners
- Conference League: League phase
- Top goalscorer: League: Geoffrey Chinedu (7); All: Geoffrey Chinedu (15)
- Highest home attendance: 20,982 vs Chelsea (12 December 2024)
- Lowest home attendance: 200 vs Shakhter Karagandy (16 October 2024)
- Average home league attendance: 1,671 (10 November 2024)

The 2024 FC Astana season is the sixteenth successive season that FC Astana will play in the Kazakhstan Premier League, the highest tier of association football in Kazakhstan.

== Season events ==
On 4 January, Astana announced that the loan deals for Stjepan Lončar and Dembo Darboe had ended, and that Aslan Darabayev and Žarko Tomašević had left the club after their contracts had expired.

On 10 January, Astana announced that Sagi Sovet had left the club, Varazdat Haroyan also leaving the club the following day.

On 16 January, Astana announced the signing of Barnes Osei to a one-year contract from Dinamo Tbilisi.

On 18 January, Astana announced the return of Ramazan Karimov to a one-year contract from Maktaaral, and the return of free-agent Marat Bystrov who'd previously played for Akhmat Grozny. Later the same day, Astana announced that Kamo Hovhannisyan had left the club.

On 21 January, Astana announced the singing of Ousmane Camara to a three-year contract from Dinamo Tbilisi.

On 2 February, Astana announced the departure of Abat Aymbetov.

On 7 February, Astana announced the signing of Kipras Kažukolovas from Žalgiris.

On 10 February, Astana announced the signing of Giannis Masouras from A.E. Kifisia to a two-year contract.

On 17 February, Astana announced the signing of Mukhammedzhan Seysen, who'd recently left Ordabasy, to a one-year contract.

On 24 February, Astana announced that they will play their home matches at the Khan Taniri Stadium in Almaty due to renovation work to the Astana Arena.

On 2 March, Astana announced the signing of Carlitos from PAS Lamia 1964.

On 6 April, Astana announced that Vladislav Prokopenko would spend the season on loan at Zhenis, and that they had signed Nnamdi Ahanonu from Skënderbeu Korçë to a three-year contract.

On 6 May, Astana announced that Carlitos had left the club after requesting to terminate his contract.

On 7 June, Astana announced that Giannis Masouras had left the club by mutual agreement.

On 27 June, Astana announced the signing of Karlo Bartolec to an 18-month contract from Lokomotiva Zagreb. The following day, 28 June, Astana also announced the signing of Branimir Kalaica from Lokomotiva Zagreb, on a contract until the end of the 2026 season.

On 1 July, Astana announced the signing of Nazmi Gripshi to a two-year contract from Ballkani.

On 3 July, Astana announced the signing of Geoffrey Chinedu from Liaoning Tieren on a contract until the end of the 2026 season.

On 11 July, Astana announced that Talgat Kusyapov had left the club to sign for KAMAZ.

On 11 August, Astana announced that they were in progress of terminating the contract of Fabien Ourega. The following day, 12 August, Astana announced the release of Ourega.

== Squad ==
As of match played 20 December 2024

No.	Name	Nationality	Position	Date of birth (age)	Signed from	Signed in	Contract ends	Apps.	Goals
Goalkeepers
55	Aleksandr Zarutskiy	(Kazakhstan)	GK	26 August 1993 (aged 31)	Kaisar	2021		54	0
74	Mukhammedzhan Seysen	(Kazakhstan)	GK	14 February 1999 (aged 25)	Unattached	2024	2024	6	0
93	Josip Čondrić	(Croatia)	GK	27 August 1993 (aged 31)	Zrinjski Mostar	2023		63	0
Defenders
2	Karlo Bartolec	(Croatia)	DF	20 April 1995 (aged 29)	Lokomotiva Zagreb	2024	2025	24	3
3	Branimir Kalaica	(Croatia)	DF	1 June 1998 (aged 26)	Lokomotiva Zagreb	2024	2026	23	3
4	Marat Bystrov	(Kazakhstan)	DF	19 June 1992 (aged 32)	Unattached	2024	2024	24	0
5	Kipras Kažukolovas	(Lithuania)	DF	20 November 2000 (aged 24)	Žalgiris	2024		36	3
6	Yan Vorogovsky	(Kazakhstan)	DF	7 August 1996 (aged 28)	RWD Molenbeek	2023	2026	53	2
15	Abzal Beysebekov	(Kazakhstan)	DF	30 November 1992 (aged 32)	Vostok	2012		414	19
22	Aleksandr Marochkin	(Kazakhstan)	DF	14 July 1990 (aged 34)	Tobol	2023		52	1
27	Timur Dosmagambetov	(Kazakhstan)	DF	1 May 1989 (aged 35)	Shakhter Karagandy	2022		63	7
45	Aleksa Amanović	(North Macedonia)	DF	24 October 1996 (aged 28)	Tobol	2023		76	3
Midfielders
7	Max Ebong	(Belarus)	MF	26 August 1999 (aged 25)	Shakhtyor Soligorsk	2020		149	8
8	Islambek Kuat	(Kazakhstan)	MF	12 January 1993 (aged 31)	Khimki	2021	2024	132	5
10	Marin Tomasov	(Croatia)	MF	31 August 1987 (aged 37)	Rijeka	2018		270	110
19	Barnes Osei	(Ghana)	MF	8 January 1995 (aged 29)	Dinamo Tbilisi	2024	2024 (+1)	25	0
21	Elkhan Astanov	(Kazakhstan)	MF	21 May 2000 (aged 24)	Ordabasy	2023		63	9
77	Nazmi Gripshi	(Albania)	MF	5 July 1997 (aged 27)	Ballkani	2024	2026	24	9
Forwards
9	Geoffrey Chinedu	(Nigeria)	FW	1 October 1997 (aged 27)	Liaoning Tieren	2024	2026	23	15
11	Nnamdi Ahanonu	(Nigeria)	FW	22 February 2002 (aged 22)	Skënderbeu Korçë	2024	2026	26	3
28	Ousmane Camara	(Guinea)	FW	28 December 1998 (aged 25)	Dinamo Tbilisi	2024	2026	40	6
72	Stanislav Basmanov	(Kazakhstan)	FW	24 June 2001 (aged 23)	Academy	2020		82	6
81	Ramazan Karimov	(Kazakhstan)	FW	5 July 1999 (aged 25)	Maktaaral	2024	2024	46	4
97	Nurali Zhaksylykov	(Kazakhstan)	FW	4 November 2004 (aged 20)	Academy	2023		15	1
Youth team
47	Maksim Mamontov	(Kazakhstan)	DF	23 April 2004 (aged 20)	Academy	2022		0	0
52	Timur Tokenov	(Kazakhstan)	DF	24 April 2004 (aged 20)	Academy	2023		0	0
53	Andrey Berezutskiy	(Kazakhstan)	FW	30 January 2004 (aged 20)	Academy	2021		1	0
57	Akhmetali Kaltanov	(Kazakhstan)	MF	19 April 2006 (aged 18)	Academy	2023		0	0
71	Sanzhar Anuarov	(Kazakhstan)	DF	16 February 2005 (aged 19)	Academy	2023		1	0
74	Omirzhan Omarbek	(Kazakhstan)	FW	3 October 2005 (aged 19)	Academy	2023		0	0
78	Rakhimzhan Amangeldinov	(Kazakhstan)	MF	24 November 2005 (aged 19)	Academy	2023		0	0
80	Damir Elubaev	(Kazakhstan)	FW	6 April 2005 (aged 19)	Academy	2023		0	0
91	Tamirlan Abuov	(Kazakhstan)	GK	13 September 2004 (aged 20)	Academy	2023		0	0
96	Batyrkhan Mustafin	(Kazakhstan)	FW	26 March 2005 (aged 19)	Academy	2023		3	0
Players away on loan
20	Vladislav Prokopenko	(Kazakhstan)	FW	1 July 2000 (aged 24)	Academy	2016		61	6
29	Dušan Jovančić	(Serbia)	MF	19 October 1990 (aged 34)	Tobol	2023		34	0
Left during the season
9	Carlitos	(Spain)	FW	12 June 1990 (aged 34)	PAS Lamia 1964	2024		3	0
17	Giannis Masouras	(Greece)	DF	24 August 1996 (aged 28)	A.E. Kifisia	2024	2025	9	0
23	Fabien Ourega	(France)	MF	7 December 1992 (aged 32)	Žalgiris	2023		50	1
66	Talgat Kusyapov	(Kazakhstan)	DF	14 February 1999 (aged 25)	Academy	2016		26	2
94	Yuri Akhanov	(Kazakhstan)	DF	31 July 2002 (aged 22)	Academy	2021		3	0
99	Konstantin Onoprienko	(Kazakhstan)	GK	5 August 2003 (aged 21)	Academy	2022		0	0
	Mikhail Gabyshev	(Kazakhstan)	DF	2 January 1990 (aged 34)	Shakhter Karagandy	2022		23	1

== Transfers ==
=== In ===
Date	Position	Nationality	Name	From	Fee	Ref.
16 January 2024	MF	(Ghana)	Barnes Osei	Dinamo Tbilisi	Undisclosed	
18 January 2024	FW	(Kazakhstan)	Ramazan Karimov	Maktaaral	Undisclosed	
18 January 2024	DF	(Kazakhstan)	Marat Bystrov	Unattached	Free	
21 January 2024	MF	(Guinea)	Ousmane Camara	Dinamo Tbilisi	Undisclosed	
7 February 2024	DF	(Lithuania)	Kipras Kažukolovas	Žalgiris	Undisclosed	
10 February 2024	DF	(Greece)	Giannis Masouras	A.E. Kifisia	Undisclosed	
17 February 2024	GK	(Kazakhstan)	Mukhammedzhan Seysen	Unattached	Free	
2 March 2024	FW	(Spain)	Carlitos	PAS Lamia 1964	Undisclosed	
6 April 2024	FW	(Nigeria)	Nnamdi Ahanonu	Skënderbeu Korçë	Undisclosed	
27 June 2024	DF	(Croatia)	Karlo Bartolec	Lokomotiva Zagreb	Undisclosed	
28 June 2024	DF	(Croatia)	Branimir Kalaica	Lokomotiva Zagreb	Undisclosed	
1 July 2024	MF	(Albania)	Nazmi Gripshi	Ballkani	Undisclosed	
3 July 2024	FW	(Nigeria)	Geoffrey Chinedu	Liaoning Tieren	Undisclosed	

=== Out ===
Date	Position	Nationality	Name	To	Fee	Ref.
4 April 2024	DF	(Kazakhstan)	Mikhail Gabyshev	Yelimay	Undisclosed	
11 July 2024	DF	(Kazakhstan)	Talgat Kusyapov	KAMAZ	Undisclosed	

=== Loans out ===
Date from	Position	Nationality	Name	To	Date to	Ref.
2 February 2024	MF	(Serbia)	Dušan Jovančić	A.E. Kifisia	30 June 2024	
6 April 2024	FW	(Kazakhstan)	Vladislav Prokopenko	Zhenis	31 December 2024	
30 June 2024	MF	(Serbia)	Dušan Jovančić	Kyzylzhar	6 December 2024	

=== Released ===
Date	Position	Nationality	Name	Joined	Date	Ref.
4 January 2024	DF	(Montenegro)	Žarko Tomašević	Dečić		
4 January 2024	MF	(Kazakhstan)	Aslan Darabayev	Elimai	4 July 2024	
10 January 2024	DF	(Kazakhstan)	Sagi Sovet	Zhenis	24 January 2024	
11 January 2024	DF	(Armenia)	Varazdat Haroyan	Qingdao West Coast	4 February 2024	
18 January 2024	DF	(Armenia)	Kamo Hovhannisyan	Ararat-Armenia	20 January 2024	
2 February 2024	FW	(Kazakhstan)	Abat Aymbetov	Adana Demirspor	5 February 2024	
5 February 2024	GK	(Kazakhstan)	Konstantin Onoprienko			
26 February 2024	DF	(Kazakhstan)	Yuri Akhanov			
6 May 2024	FW	(Spain)	Carlitos	Atromitos	12 June 2024	
7 June 2024	DF	(Greece)	Giannis Masouras	AC Omonia	13 June 2024	
11 August 2024	MF	(France)	Fabien Ourega	Kauno Žalgiris	26 February 2025	
31 December 2024	MF	(Kazakhstan)	Timur Dosmagambetov	Okzhetpes		
31 December 2024	MF	(Kazakhstan)	Islambek Kuat	Zhenis	16 February 2025	
31 December 2024	MF	(Serbia)	Dušan Jovančić	Čukarički	5 January 2025	
31 December 2024	FW	(Kazakhstan)	Damir Elubaev			
31 December 2024	FW	(Kazakhstan)	Omirzhan Omarbek			

== Friendlies ==
30 January 2024	Astana	0–0	Urartu	United Arab Emirates
18:00 (UTC+6)		Report

8 February 2024	Astana	4–2	Gulf United	United Arab Emirates
(UTC+6)	Astanov 27', 67'; Ebong 54'; Basmanov 61'	Report	Fowler 7'; Peniket 58'

11 February 2024	Astana	3–0	Elite Falcons	United Arab Emirates
(UTC+6)	Tomasov 7' (pen.); Prokopenko 11'; Zhaksylykov 82'	Report

14 February 2024	Astana	4–2	Krasnodar	United Arab Emirates
19:00 (UTC+6)	Tomasov 7'; Camara 23'; Ebong 35'; Karimov 66'	Report	Kady 38'; Córdoba 47'

17 February 2024	Astana	0–1	Rostov	United Arab Emirates
18:30 (UTC+6)	Kuat (yellow card) 44'	Report	Mohebi 19'

21 February 2024	Spartak Moscow	4–0	Astana	United Arab Emirates
18:30 (UTC+6)	Astanov 16' (o.g.); Promes 26', 31', 45'	Report

== Competitions ==
=== Overview ===
Competition	First match	Last match	Starting round	Final position	Record							
Competition	First match	Last match	Starting round	Final position	Pld	W	D	L	GF	GA	GD	Win %
Premier League	1 March 2024	10 November 2024	Matchday 1	2nd	24	14	4	6	39	19	+20	58.33
Kazakhstan Cup	13 April 2024	8 May 2024	Round of 16	Quarterfinal	2	1	0	1	1	1	+0	50.00
League Cup	26 May 2024	24 November 2024	Group stage	Winners	6	3	2	1	12	4	+8	50.00
UEFA Conference League	25 July 2024	20 December 2024	Second qualifying round	League phase	12	5	3	4	17	13	+4	41.67
Total					44	23	9	12	69	37	+32	52.27

Last updated: 20 December 2024
Source: Competitions

=== Premier League ===
==== Results summary ====
Overall								Home						Away					
Pld	W	D	L	GF	GA	GD	Pts	W	D	L	GF	GA	GD	W	D	L	GF	GA	GD
24	14	4	6	39	19	+20	46	7	3	3	24	13	+11	7	1	3	15	6	+9

Last updated: 10 November 2024.
Source: See Results

==== Results by round ====
Round	1	2	3	4	5	6	7	8	9	10^{1}	11	12	13	14^{1}	16	19	20	15	21	18	22	23	24	17	25	26
Ground	H	A	H	A	H	A	A	H	A	H	H	A	H	A	H	A	H	A	A	A	H	A	H	H	A	H
Result	W	W	L	L	D	W	D	D	L	P	L	W	L	P	W	W	W	W	W	D	W	W	W	W	L	W
Position	4	2	3	7	6	2	3	7	7	6	9	8	9	9	8	8	7	5	5	5	5	3	2	1	2	2

Source: See Results
A = Away; H = Home; W = Win; D = Draw; L = Loss; P = Bye
Notes:
- ^{1} Astana had a bye during the tenth and fourteenth round of fixtures.

==== Results ====
1 March 2024 1	Astana	2–0	Zhenis	Almaty
14:30 (UTC+5)	Kalmykov 18' (o.g.); Barnes (yellow card) 43'; Ourega (yellow card) 49'	Report	Bidzinashvili (yellow card) 85'	Stadium: Khan Taniri Stadium; Attendance: 1,094; Referee: D.Izmailov

5 March 2024 2	Zhetysu	0–2	Astana	Taldykorgan
17:00 (UTC+5)	Orynbasar (yellow card) 35'; Muzhikov (yellow card) 46'; Dairov (yellow card) 48'; Chaduneli (yellow card) 84'	Report	Amanović (yellow card) 54'; Vorogovsky 87'; Astanov 90+3' (pen.)	Stadium: Zhetysu Stadium; Attendance: 800; Referee: Grigory Moskovchenko

31 March 2024 3	Astana	0–1	Elimai	Almaty
16:30 (UTC+5)	Amanović (red card) 59'; Camara (yellow card) 74'	Report	Yashin (yellow card) 25'; Schmidt (yellow card) 34'; Cornette (yellow card) 67'; Korzun (yellow card) 70'; Murtazayev 88'; Nurgaliyev (yellow card) 90+7'; Pertsukh (yellow card) 90+8'	Stadium: Khan Taniri Stadium; Attendance: 1,575; Referee: Artem Kuchin

7 April 2024 4	Shakhter Karagandy	1–0	Astana	Karaganda
16:30 (UTC+5)	Cañas 26' (yellow card) 63'; Savkiv (yellow card) 37'; Alishauskas (yellow card) 40'; Tyulyubay (yellow card) 68'	Report	Astanov (yellow card) 54'; Tomasov (yellow card) 90+2'	Stadium: Shakhter Stadium; Attendance: 4,000; Referee: Baghdad Abdullayev

21 April 2024 5	Astana	2–2	Tobol	Almaty
16:30 (UTC+5)	Marochkin (yellow card) 10'; Tomasov 27'; Karimov (yellow card) 70'; Vorogovsky (yellow card) 89'; Basmanov 90+3'; Dosmagambetov (yellow card) 90+5'	Report	Ndiaye 13' (yellow card) 39'; Zhumashev (yellow card) 68'; Miladinović (yellow card) 71'; Henen 78' (yellow card) 90+4'; Ivanović (yellow card) 84'	Stadium: Khan Taniri Stadium; Attendance: 1,700; Referee: Denis Izmailov

27 April 2024 6	Turan	0–2	Astana	Turkistan
16:30 (UTC+5)	Nikolić (yellow card) 3'; Choug (red card) 6'; Jakoliš (yellow card) 42'; Mawutor (yellow card) 58'; Zakirov (yellow card) 66'	Report	Tomasov (yellow card) 17'; Amanović 56' (pen.); Camara 65'; Beysebekov (yellow card) 67'; Basmanov (yellow card) 90+5'	Stadium: Turkistan Arena; Attendance: 300; Referee: Alexander Zatula

4 May 2024 7	Aktobe	1–1	Astana	Aktobe
19:00 (UTC+5)	Kiki (yellow card) 56'; Umayev 77'; Barać (yellow card) 81'; Kenesov (yellow card) 90+5'	Report	Kuat 23' (red card) 43'	Stadium: Central Stadium; Attendance: 12,600; Referee: Grigory Moskovchenko

12 May 2024 8	Astana	1–1	Kaisar	Almaty
19:00 (UTC+5)	Amanović (yellow card) 33'; Tomasov 57'	Report	Kobuladze (yellow card) 77'; Gromyko 90+3'	Stadium: Khan Taniri Stadium; Attendance: 1,032; Referee: Rustam Omarov

18 May 2024 9	Atyrau	1–0	Astana	Atyrau
17:00 (UTC+5)	Signevich 28'; Olimzoda (yellow card) 90'	Report	Bystrov (yellow card) 68'	Stadium: Munaishy Stadium; Attendance: 5,500; Referee: Daniyar Sakhi

10	Astana	Bye	Aksu	Almaty
(UTC+5)				Stadium: Khan Taniri Stadium

16 June 2024 11	Astana	0–1	Ordabasy	Almaty
20:00 (UTC+5)		Report	Šehović (yellow card) 70'; Tungyshbayev 77' (yellow card) 87'; Abiken (yellow card) 90+2'	Stadium: Khan Taniri Stadium; Attendance: 2,000; Referee: Artem Kuchin

22 June 2024 12	Kyzylzhar	0–1	Astana	Petropavl
18:00 (UTC+5)	Beryozkin (yellow card) 85'; Zhaksybaev (yellow card) 90+4'	Report	Astanov 70' (pen.)	Stadium: Karasai Stadium; Attendance: 4,000; Referee: Denis Izmailov

29 June 2024 13	Astana	1–3	Kairat	Almaty
20:00 (UTC+5)	Barnes (yellow card) 24'; Kažukolovas 28'; Astanov (penalty missed) 50'; Amanović (yellow card) 66'; Ebong (yellow card) 74'; Karimov (yellow card) 90'; Kuat (yellow card) 90+7'	Report	Martynovich (yellow card) 2'; Yuldoshev (yellow card) 27'; João Paulo 29'; Seydakhmet (yellow card) 58'; Sadybekov 67'; Sergeyev 90+5'	Stadium: Khan Taniri Stadium; Attendance: 3,000; Referee: Bulat Sariev

14	Aksu	Bye	Astana	Pavlodar
(UTC+5)				Stadium: Central Stadium

4 August 2024 16	Astana	2–1	Turan	Almaty
18:00 (UTC+5)	Ahanonu 35'; Gripshi 90+1' (pen.)	Report	Satanov (yellow card) 55'; Kireyenko (yellow card) 57'; Dmitrijev (yellow card) 66'; Cuckić 70' (yellow card) 77'; Mukashev (yellow card) 74'; Vasilyuchek (yellow card) 90'	Stadium: Khan Taniri Stadium; Attendance: 300; Referee: Saken Baimbet

1 September 2024 19	Kairat	0–1	Astana	Almaty
18:00 (UTC+5)	Arad (yellow card) 82'	Report	Tomasov 84'	Stadium: Central Stadium; Attendance: 15,473; Referee: Bagdat Abdullayev

14 September 2024 20	Astana	2–1	Kyzylzhar	Almaty
19:00 (UTC+5)	Chinedu (penalty missed) 44' 44', 59'; Camara (penalty missed) 63'; Gripshi (yellow card) 73'	Report	Shchebetun 45'; Abzalov (yellow card) 63'; Zhaksybaev (yellow card) 64'; Brígido (yellow card) 84'	Stadium: Khan Taniri Stadium; Attendance: 250; Referee: Denis Tevyashov

18 September 2024 15	Kaisar	0–1	Astana	Kyzylorda
19:00 (UTC+5)	Narzildayev (yellow card) 39'; Tolegenov (yellow card) 45+2'; Zhaksylykov (yellow card) 69'	Report	Camara 8'; Kuat (yellow card) 33'; Barnes (yellow card) 77'; Marochkin (yellow card) 83'	Stadium: Gani Muratbayev Stadium; Attendance: 4,500; Referee: Alexander Zatula
Note: Match originally scheduled for 28 July 2024, but postponed due to Astanas participation in the UEFA Conference League.

22 September 2024 21	Ordabasy	2–4	Astana	Shymkent
19:00 (UTC+5)	Yakhshiboev 26', 45+3'; Umarov (yellow card) 33'; Ignatovich (yellow card) 73'; Suyumbayev (yellow card) 89'; Tungyshbayev (yellow card) 90+4'	Report	Amanović (yellow card) 14'; Vorogovsky 24'; Chinedu 45+2', 59'; Gripshi 74' (pen.) (yellow card) 78'	Stadium: Kazhymukan Munaitpasov Stadium; Attendance: 14,000; Referee: Bulat Sariev

29 September 2024 18	Zhenis	1–1	Astana	Astana
18:00 (UTC+5)	Adílio 60'	Report	Chinedu (52\pen.)	Stadium: Kazhymukan Munaitpasov Stadium; Attendance: 600; Referee: Grigory Moskovchenko

16 October 2024 22	Astana	3–0	Shakhter Karagandy	Almaty
19:00 (UTC+5)	Tomasov 22'; Chinedu 23'; Gripshi 54'; Barnes (yellow card) 70'	Report	Campo (yellow card) 20'	Stadium: Khan Taniri Stadium; Attendance: 200; Referee: Denis Izmailov

20 October 2024 23	Elimai	0–3	Astana	Semey
16:00 (UTC+5)	Cornette (yellow card) 90'; Yashin (yellow card) 90+3'	Report	Camara 33'; Tomasov 37'; Karimov 82'; Amanović (yellow card) 88'	Stadium: Spartak Stadium; Attendance: 8,000; Referee: Rustam Omarov

27 October 2024 23	Astana	2–0	Aktobe	Almaty
16:00 (UTC+5)	Camara 8'; Gripshi 17'; Vorogovsky (yellow card) 26'	Report	Strumia (yellow card) 59'; Romero (yellow card) 90+5'	Stadium: Khan Taniri Stadium; Attendance: 7,500; Referee: Alexander Zatula

30 October 2024 17	Astana	3–2	Atyrau	Almaty
19:00 (UTC+5)	Kalaica 67', 90+9' (pen.); Camara (yellow card) 72'; Gripshi 84' (pen.)	Report	Stasevich 26' (yellow card) 90+10'; Kerimzhanov (yellow card) 83' (goal) 90+5'; Takulov (yellow card) 90+2'; Dzhumatov (yellow card) 90+10'; Barbosa (yellow card) 90+10'	Stadium: Khan Taniri Stadium; Attendance: 700; Referee: Rustam Omarov
Note: Match originally scheduled for 18 August, but postponed due to Astanas participation in the UEFA Conference League.

3 November 2024 25	Tobol	1–0	Astana	Kostanay
16:00 (UTC+5)	Tapalov (yellow card) 48'; Ivanović 51'; Pokatilov (yellow card) 90+6'	Report	Amanović (yellow card) 57'	Stadium: Central Stadium; Attendance: 2,970; Referee: Ruslan Sultangaliev

10 November 2024 26	Astana	5–0	Zhetysu	Almaty
14:00 (UTC+5)	Chinedu 7'; Gripshi 18' (pen.); Tomasov 26'; Tkachenko 31' (o.g.); Bartolec 41'; Kuat (yellow card) 77'	Report	Baltabekov (yellow card) 28'	Stadium: Khan Taniri Stadium; Attendance: 700; Referee: Saken Baimbet

==== League table ====
Pos	Team	Pld	W	D	L	GF	GA	GD	Pts	Qualification or relegation
1	Kairat (C)	24	14	5	5	39	21	+18	47	Qualification for the Champions League first qualifying round
2	Astana	24	14	4	6	39	19	+20	46	Qualification for the Conference League second qualifying round
3	Aktobe (W)	24	12	7	5	39	26	+13	43	Qualification for the Europa League first qualifying round (Note: Aktobe qualified for the Europa League first qualifying round by winning the 2024 Kazakhstan Cup.)
4	Ordabasy	24	12	6	6	36	24	+12	42	Qualification for the Conference League first qualifying round
5	Tobol	24	11	6	7	33	23	+10	39	

Source: UEFA, Soccerway, QFL
Rules for classification: 1) Points; 2) Goal difference; 3) Matches won; 4) Goals scored; 5) Away goals scored; 6) Head-to-head points; 7) Head-to-head matches won; 8) Head-to-head goal difference; 9) Head-to-head goals scored; 10) Head-to-head away goals scored; 11) Draw.
(C) Champions; (W) Cup winners

=== Kazakhstan Cup ===
13 April 2024 Round of 16	Zhenis	0–1	Astana	Astana
16:00 (UTC+5)	Manaj (yellow card) 36'	Report	Karimov 5'; Masouras (yellow card) 90+1'	Stadium: Kazhymukan Munaitpasov Stadium; Attendance: 400; Referee: Georgy Chekhovsky

8 May 2024 Quarter-finals	Tobol	1–0	Astana	Kostanay
18:00 (UTC+5)	Chesnokov 20' (yellow card) 90+4'; Gabarayev (yellow card) 72'	Report	Astanov (yellow card) 72'	Stadium: Central Stadium; Attendance: 2,850; Referee: Bulat Sariev

=== League Cup ===
==== Group stage ====
Pos	Team	Pld	W	D	L	GF	GA	GD	Pts	Qualification
1	Astana	3	2	0	1	10	4	+6	6	Advanced to Semifinals
2	Caspiy	3	2	0	1	3	6	−3	6	
3	Zhetysu	3	1	0	2	4	5	−1	3	
4	Shakhter Karagandy	3	1	0	2	4	6	−2	3	

Updated to match(es) played on 20 July 2024. Source:

26 May 2024 1	Zhetysu	2–1	Astana	Taldykorgan
17:00 (UTC+5)	Muzhikov 7'; Karaman (yellow card) 14'; Shramchenko 74'; Braga (yellow card) 90+1'	Report	Ahanonu 11'; Dosmagambetov (yellow card) 45'; Kuat (yellow card) 90+5'; Astanov (yellow card) 90+5'	Stadium: Zhetysu Stadium; Attendance: 2,500; Referee: Sanjar Iskakov

7 July 2024 2	Astana	5–0	Caspiy	Almaty
20:00 (UTC+5)	Ahanonu 18'; Astanov 36'; Kažukolovas (yellow card) 41'; Barnes (yellow card) 53'; Bartolec 62'; Tomasov 79'; Basmanov 82'; Marochkin (yellow card) 82'	Report	Khalmatov (yellow card) 51'	Stadium: Khan Taniri Stadium; Attendance: 750; Referee: Kirill Tkachev

19 July 2024 3	Shakhter Karagandy	2–4	Astana	Karaganda
17:00 (UTC+5)	Kozlov 6'; Cañas 36' (yellow card) 52'; Ilic (yellow card) 73'	Report	Chinedu 13', 30' (pen.), 78'; Amanović (yellow card) 41'; Gripshi 48'; Tomasov (yellow card) 65'	Stadium: Shakhter Stadium; Attendance: 3,000; Referee: Alexander Zatula

==== Knockout stage ====
11 August 2024 Semi-finals 1st leg	Elimai	0–0	Astana	Semey
20:00 (UTC+5)	Yashin (red card) 70'; Shomko (yellow card) 90+2'	Report		Stadium: Spartak Stadium; Attendance: 7,000; Referee: Denis Izmailov

25 September 2024 Semi-finals 2nd leg	Astana	0–0 (a.e.t.) (0–0 agg.) (3–1 p)	Elimai	Astana
19:00 (UTC+5)	Bystrov (yellow card) 69'; Barnes (yellow card) 84'; Kalaica (yellow card) 102'	Report	Pertsukh (red card) 105'	Stadium: Astana Arena; Attendance: 800; Referee: Ruslan Sultangaliev
	Penalties
	Karimov (penalty scored); Astanov (penalty scored); Amanović (penalty missed); Kalaica (penalty scored)		(penalty missed) China; (penalty missed) Darabayev; (penalty missed) Mashukov; (penalty scored) Reyes

23 November 2024 Final	Zhenis	0–2	Astana	Turkistan
15:00 (UTC+5)	Oliveira (yellow card) 56'	Report	Amanović (yellow card) 57'; Ebong (yellow card) 68'; Camara (yellow card) 78' (goal) 120+2'; Vorogovsky (yellow card) 97'; Bartolec 105'; Kažukolovas (yellow card) 111'; Kuat (yellow card) 117'	Stadium: Turkistan Arena; Attendance: 5,000; Referee: Sanzhar Iskakov

=== UEFA Conference League ===
==== Qualifying rounds ====
25 July 2024 Second qualifying round 1st leg	Milsami Orhei (Moldova)	1–1	(Kazakhstan) Astana	Orhei, Moldova
21:00 (UTC+5)	Khali (yellow card) 79'; Lupano 90'	Report	Gripshi 58'; Kažukolovas (yellow card) 66'; Chinedu (yellow card) 80'	Stadium: CSR Orhei; Attendance: 3,000; Referee: Nikola Popov (Bulgaria)

1 August 2024 Second qualifying round 2nd leg	Astana (Kazakhstan)	1–0 (2–1 agg.)	(Moldova) Milsami Orhei	Almaty
19:00 (UTC+5)	Camara (yellow card) 44'; Tomasov 50'	Report	Luchita (yellow card) 20'; Ndon (yellow card) 33' (yellow-red card) 55'; Lisu (yellow card) 70'	Stadium: Almaty Central Stadium; Attendance: 7,362; Referee: Ruddy Buquet (France)
Note: Match played at the Almaty Central Stadium in Almaty, instead of Astanas regular stadium, the Astana Arena, in Astana, due to renovation works.

8 August 2024 Third qualifying round 1st leg	Corvinul Hunedoara (Romania)	1–2	(Kazakhstan) Astana	Sibiu, Romania
23:00 (UTC+5)	Manolache 37' (yellow card) 38'	Report	Marochkin (yellow card) 44'; Camara 62'; Ebong (yellow card) 78'; Chinedu 80'	Stadium: Sibiu Municipal Stadium; Attendance: 6,135; Referee: Ishmael Barbara (Malta)
Note: Corvinul Hunedoara play their home match at the Sibiu Municipal Stadium in Sibiu, instead of their regular stadium, the Michael Klein Stadium, in Hunedoara, which did not meet UEFA requirements.

14 August 2024 Third qualifying round 2nd leg	Astana (Kazakhstan)	6–1 (8–2 agg.)	(Romania) Corvinul Hunedoara	Almaty
19:00 (UTC+5)	Chinedu 13', 68'; Kažukolovas (yellow card) 50'; Tomasov 57', 76'; Bartolec (yellow card) 71'; Gripshi 73'; Astanov 84'	Report	Bradu (yellow card) 40'; Neacșa (yellow card) 60'; Lupu (yellow card) 77'; Velisar 78'	Stadium: Almaty Central Stadium; Attendance: 6,725; Referee: Atilla Karaoğlan (Turkey)
Note: Match played at the Almaty Central Stadium in Almaty, instead of Astanas regular stadium, the Astana Arena, in Astana, due to renovation works.

22 August 2024 Play-off round 1st leg	Brann (Norway)	2–0	(Kazakhstan) Astana	Bergen, Norway
22:00 (UTC+5)	Myhre 12'; Kornvig (yellow card) 48'; Finne 70'; Soltvedt (yellow card) 81'	Report	Ebong (yellow card) 44'; Bartolec (yellow card) 72'	Stadium: Brann Stadion; Attendance: 14,777; Referee: David Šmajc (Slovenia)

29 August 2024 Play-off round 2nd leg	Astana (Kazakhstan)	3–0 (3–2 agg.)	(Norway) Brann	Almaty
19:00 (UTC+5)	Amanović (yellow card) 45+1'; Chinedu 60', 81'; Karimov 90+1'; Dosmagambetov (yellow card) 90+5'	Report	Myhre (yellow card) 66'; Heggebø (yellow card) 72'; Soltvedt (yellow card) 77'	Stadium: Almaty Central Stadium; Attendance: 8,276; Referee: Aleksandar Stavrev (North Macedonia)
Note: Match played at the Almaty Central Stadium in Almaty, instead of Astanas regular stadium, the Astana Arena, in Astana, due to renovation works.}

==== League Phase ====
Pos	Team	Pld	W	D	L	GF	GA	GD	Pts
26	(Turkish Football Federation) İstanbul Başakşehir	6	1	3	2	9	12	−3	6
27	(Football Association of the Czech Republic) Mladá Boleslav	6	2	0	4	7	10	−3	6
28	(Kazakhstan Football Federation) Astana	6	1	2	3	4	8	−4	5
29	(Swiss Football Association) St. Gallen	6	1	2	3	10	18	−8	5
30	(Football Association of Finland) HJK	6	1	1	4	3	9	−6	4

Source: UEFA
Rules for classification: League phase tiebreakers

Round	1	2	3	4	5	6
Ground	H	A	A	H	H	A
Result	W	L	L	D	L	D
Position	14	21	25	23	28	28

Updated to match(es) played on 20 December 2024. Source: Results
A = Away; H = Home; W = Win; D = Draw; L = Loss

3 October 2024 1	Astana (Kazakhstan)	1–0	(Serbia) TSC	Almaty
21:45 (UTC+5)	Kažukolovas 15'; Karimov (yellow card) 84'	Report	St.Jovanović (yellow card) 8'; Radin (yellow card) 39'	Stadium: Central Stadium; Attendance: 6,576; Referee: Oliver Reitala (Finland)
Note: Astana will play their home matches at Almaty Central Stadium, Almaty, instead of their regular stadium, Astana Arena, Astana, due to renovation works.

25 October 2024 2	The New Saints (Wales)	2–0	(Kazakhstan) Astana	Shrewsbury, England
00:00 (UTC+5)	Holden 40'; McManus 78' (pen.)	Report		Stadium: New Meadow; Attendance: 2,202; Referee: Juri Frischer (Estonia)
Note: The New Saints played their home matches at New Meadow, Shrewsbury, England, instead of their regular stadium, Park Hall, Oswestry, which did not meet UEFA requirements.

7 November 2024 3	Pafos (Cyprus)	1–0	(Kazakhstan) Astana	Limassol, Cyprus
22:45 (UTC+5)	Anderson 87'	Report	Kuat (yellow card) 42'; Seysen (yellow card) 52'	Stadium: Alphamega Stadium; Attendance: 3,062; Referee: Don Robertson (Scotland)
Note: Pafos will play their home matches at the Alphamega Stadium, Limassol, instead of their regular stadium, Stelios Kyriakides Stadium, Paphos, which did not meet UEFA requirements.

28 November 2024 4	Astana (Kazakhstan)	1–1	(Portugal) Vitória de Guimarães	Almaty
20:30 (UTC+5)	Kalaica 40'; Chinedu (yellow card) 63'; Ebong (yellow card) 81'; Condric (yellow card) 90'; Bartolec (yellow card) 90+4'; Amanović (yellow card) 90+4'	Report	Tiago Silva (yellow card) 58'; Costa (yellow card) 77'; Jesús Ramírez 89'; Händel (yellow card) 90+2'; João Mendes (yellow card) 90+4'	Stadium: Central Stadium; Attendance: 3,562; Referee: Nikola Dabanović (Montenegro)
Note: Astana will play their home matches at Almaty Central Stadium, Almaty, instead of their regular stadium, Astana Arena, Astana, due to renovation works.

12 December 2024 5	Astana (Kazakhstan)	1–3	(England) Chelsea	Almaty
20:30 (UTC+5)	Amanović (yellow card) 27'; Tomasov 45'	Report	Guiu 14', 18'; Veiga 39'	Stadium: Central Stadium; Attendance: 20,982; Referee: Sven Jablonski (Germany)
Note: Astana will play their home matches at Almaty Central Stadium, Almaty, instead of their regular stadium, Astana Arena, Astana, due to renovation works.

20 December 2024 6	APOEL (Cyprus)	1–1	(Kazakhstan) Astana	Nicosia, Cyprus
01:00 (UTC+5)	Kostadinov (yellow card) 31'; Petrović (yellow card) 35'; Abagna (yellow card) 49'; Donis 57'; Satsias (yellow card) 70' (yellow-red card) 70'	Report	Ebong (yellow card) 5' (yellow-red card) 65'; Kažukolovas 64'; Barnes (yellow card) 70'; Čondrić (yellow card) 84'; Astanov (yellow card) 89'	Stadium: GSP Stadium; Attendance: 11,181; Referee: Sebastian Gishamer (Austria)

== Squad statistics ==
As of match played 20 December 2024

=== Appearances and goals ===
No.	Pos	Nat	Player	Total		Premier League		Kazakhstan Cup		League Cup		Conference League	
No.	Pos	Nat	Player	Apps	Goals	Apps	Goals	Apps	Goals	Apps	Goals	Apps	Goals
2	DF	(Croatia) CRO	Karlo Bartolec	24	3	11	1	0	0	2+1	2	10	0
3	DF	(Croatia) CRO	Branimir Kalaica	23	3	9+2	2	0	0	3+1	0	5+3	1
4	DF	(Kazakhstan) KAZ	Marat Bystrov	24	0	11+4	0	1	0	3+1	0	2+2	0
5	DF	(Lithuania) LTU	Kipras Kažukolovas	36	3	16+4	1	1	0	3+2	0	10	2
6	DF	(Kazakhstan) KAZ	Yan Vorogovsky	35	2	20+1	2	1	0	2+1	0	10	0
7	MF	(Belarus) BLR	Max Ebong	37	0	17+5	0	1+1	0	3	0	10	0
8	MF	(Kazakhstan) KAZ	Islambek Kuat	33	1	9+10	1	2	0	4+1	0	2+5	0
9	FW	(Nigeria) NGR	Geoffrey Chinedu	23	15	10	7	0	0	3	3	10	5
10	MF	(Croatia) CRO	Marin Tomasov	38	11	21+2	6	1	0	2+2	1	10	4
11	FW	(Nigeria) NGR	Nnamdi Ahanonu	26	3	6+7	1	0+1	0	5	2	2+5	0
15	DF	(Kazakhstan) KAZ	Abzal Beysebekov	19	0	6+7	0	0	0	4	0	2	0
19	MF	(Ghana) GHA	Barnes Osei	25	0	11+3	0	1	0	2+2	0	2+4	0
21	MF	(Kazakhstan) KAZ	Elkhan Astanov	32	5	5+13	3	1+1	0	4+1	1	2+5	1
22	DF	(Kazakhstan) KAZ	Aleksandr Marochkin	34	0	13+6	0	1	0	3+2	0	8+1	0
27	DF	(Kazakhstan) KAZ	Timur Dosmagambetov	9	0	1	0	1	0	4+1	0	2	0
28	FW	(Guinea) GUI	Ousmane Camara	40	6	23	4	1+1	0	3+2	1	10	1
45	DF	(North Macedonia) MKD	Aleksa Amanović	37	1	20+1	1	1+1	0	3+1	0	10	0
55	GK	(Kazakhstan) KAZ	Aleksandr Zarutskiy	10	0	8	0	1	0	0	0	1	0
71	DF	(Kazakhstan) KAZ	Sanzhar Anuarov	1	0	0	0	0	0	0+1	0	0	0
72	FW	(Kazakhstan) KAZ	Stanislav Basmanov	20	2	2+10	1	1+1	0	2+2	1	2	0
74	GK	(Kazakhstan) KAZ	Mukhammedzhan Seysen	6	0	0	0	1	0	3	0	2	0
77	MF	(Albania) ALB	Nazmi Gripshi	24	9	11+1	6	0	0	2	1	9+1	2
81	FW	(Kazakhstan) KAZ	Ramazan Karimov	40	3	4+19	1	2	1	2+3	0	2+8	1
93	GK	(Croatia) CRO	Josip Čondrić	28	0	16	0	0	0	3	0	9	0
96	FW	(Kazakhstan) KAZ	Batyrkhan Mustafin	1	0	0	0	0	0	0	0	0+1	0
97	FW	(Kazakhstan) KAZ	Nurali Zhaksylykov	5	0	0+1	0	0+1	0	0+1	0	0+2	0
Players away from Astana on loan:
Players who left Astana during the season:
9	FW	(Spain) ESP	Carlitos	3	0	3	0	0	0	0	0	0	0
17	DF	(Greece) GRE	Giannis Masouras	9	0	5+1	0	1+1	0	0+1	0	0	0
23	MF	(France) FRA	Fabien Ourega	11	0	5+3	0	2	0	1	0	0	0
66	DF	(Kazakhstan) KAZ	Talgat Kusyapov	3	0	1+1	0	1	0	0	0	0	0

=== Goal scorers ===
Place	Position	Nation	Number	Name	Premier League	Kazakhstan Cup	League Cup	UEFA Conference League	Total
1	FW	(Nigeria)	9	Geoffrey Chinedu	7	0	3	5	15
2	MF	(Croatia)	10	Marin Tomasov	6	0	1	4	11
3	MF	(Albania)	77	Nazmi Gripshi	6	0	1	2	9
4	FW	(Guinea)	28	Ousmane Camara	4	0	1	1	6
5	MF	(Kazakhstan)	21	Elkhan Astanov	3	0	1	1	5
6	DF	(Croatia)	3	Branimir Kalaica	2	0	0	1	3
6	FW	(Kazakhstan)	81	Ramazan Karimov	1	1	0	1	3
6	FW	(Nigeria)	11	Nnamdi Ahanonu	1	0	2	0	3
6	DF	(Croatia)	2	Karlo Bartolec	1	0	2	0	3
6	DF	(Lithuania)	5	Kipras Kažukolovas	1	0	0	2	3
11	DF	(Kazakhstan)	6	Yan Vorogovsky	2	0	0	0	2
11	FW	(Kazakhstan)	72	Stanislav Basmanov	1	0	1	0	2
11				Own goal	2	0	0	0	2
14	DF	(North Macedonia)	45	Aleksa Amanović	1	0	0	0	1
14	MF	(Kazakhstan)	8	Islambek Kuat	1	0	0	0	1
				TOTALS	39	1	12	17	69

=== Clean sheets ===
Place	Position	Nation	Number	Name	Premier League	Kazakhstan Cup	League Cup	UEFA Conference League	Total
1	GK	(Croatia)	93	Josip Čondrić	8	0	1	3	12
2	GK	(Kazakhstan)	55	Aleksandr Zarutskiy	2	1	0	0	3
2	GK	(Kazakhstan)	74	Mukhammedzhan Seysen	0	0	3	0	3
				TOTALS	10	1	4	3	18

=== Disciplinary record ===
Number	Nation	Position	Name	Premier League		Kazakhstan Cup		League Cup		UEFA Conference League		Total	
Number	Nation	Position	Name	Booked	Sent off (straight red)	Booked	Sent off (straight red)	Booked	Sent off (straight red)	Booked	Sent off (straight red)	Booked	Sent off (straight red)
2	(Kazakhstan)	DF	Karlo Bartolec	0	0	0	0	0	0	3	0	3	0
3	(Kazakhstan)	DF	Branimir Kalaica	0	0	0	0	1	0	0	0	1	0
4	(Kazakhstan)	DF	Marat Bystrov	1	0	0	0	1	0	0	0	2	0
5	(Lithuania)	DF	Kipras Kažukolovas	0	0	0	0	2	0	2	0	4	0
6	(Kazakhstan)	DF	Yan Vorogovsky	2	0	0	0	1	0	0	0	3	0
7	(Belarus)	MF	Max Ebong	1	0	0	0	1	0	5	1	7	1
8	(Kazakhstan)	MF	Islambek Kuat	3	1	0	0	2	0	1	0	6	1
9	(Nigeria)	FW	Geoffrey Chinedu	0	0	0	0	0	0	2	0	2	0
10	(Croatia)	MF	Marin Tomasov	2	0	0	0	1	0	0	0	3	0
15	(Kazakhstan)	DF	Abzal Beysebekov	1	0	0	0	0	0	0	0	1	0
19	(Ghana)	MF	Barnes Osei	4	0	0	0	2	0	1	0	7	0
21	(Kazakhstan)	MF	Elkhan Astanov	1	0	1	0	1	0	1	0	4	0
22	(Kazakhstan)	DF	Aleksandr Marochkin	2	0	0	0	1	0	1	0	4	0
27	(Kazakhstan)	DF	Timur Dosmagambetov	1	0	0	0	1	0	1	0	3	0
28	(Guinea)	FW	Ousmane Camara	2	0	0	0	1	0	1	0	4	0
45	(North Macedonia)	DF	Aleksa Amanović	6	1	0	0	2	0	3	0	11	1
72	(Kazakhstan)	FW	Stanislav Basmanov	1	0	0	0	0	0	0	0	1	0
74	(Kazakhstan)	GK	Mukhammedzhan Seysen	0	0	0	0	0	0	1	0	1	0
77	(Albania)	MF	Nazmi Gripshi	2	0	0	0	0	0	0	0	2	0
81	(Kazakhstan)	FW	Ramazan Karimov	2	0	0	0	0	0	1	0	3	0
93	(Croatia)	GK	Josip Čondrić	0	0	0	0	0	0	2	0	2	0
Players away on loan:
Players who left Astana during the season:
17	(Greece)	DF	Giannis Masouras	0	0	1	0	0	0	0	0	1	0
23	(France)	MF	Fabien Ourega	1	0	0	0	0	0	0	0	1	0
			TOTALS	32	2	2	0	17	0	25	1	76	3
