= 2024 Kazakhstan League Cup =

64th season of the EFL Cup

1XBet League Cup

Tournament details
- Country: Kazakhstan
- Dates: 25 May - 24 November 2024
- Teams: 16

Final positions
- Champions: Astana

Tournament statistics
- Matches played: 29
- Goals scored: 82 (2.83 per match)
- Attendance: 98,071 (3,382 per match)

The 2024 Kazakhstan League Cup was the 1st season of the Kazakhstan League Cup (known as the 1XBet League Cup for sponsorship reasons).

== Draw ==
On 26 April the draw for the Kazakhstan League Cup took place.

	Clubs entering in this round	Clubs advancing from previous round	Number of games	Dates
Group stage (16 clubs)	3 clubs from Kazakhstan First League; 13 clubs from Kazakhstan Premier League	N/A	24	25 May - 21 July
Semi-finals (4 clubs)	No clubs enter the semi-finals	4 winners from Group stage	4 (two-legged)	10/11 August - 30 October
Final (2 clubs)	No clubs enter the final	2 winners from semi-finals	1	24 November

== Group stage ==
=== Group A ===
Pos	Team	Pld	W	D	L	GF	GA	GD	Pts	Qualification
1	Kairat	3	2	1	0	13	1	+12	7	Advanced to Semifinals
2	Kyzylzhar	3	1	1	1	4	4	0	4	
3	Taraz	3	1	0	2	3	6	−3	3	
4	Akzhayik	3	1	0	2	3	12	−9	3	

Updated to match(es) played on 21 July 2024. Source:

26 May 2024 1	Kairat	9–0	Akzhayik	Almaty
20:00 (UTC+5)	Shirobokov 13'; Yuldoshev 28'; Shvyryov 33'; João Paulo 38', 43', 74'; Santana 52'; Sadybekov 58' (pen.); Zaria 79'	Report		Stadium: Central Stadium; Attendance: 3,493; Referee: Ruslan Sultangaliev

26 May 2024 1	Taraz	1–2	Kyzylzhar	Taraz
20:00 (UTC+5)	Mukanbetzhanov 13'; Zhaksymbetov (yellow card) 26' (yellow-red card) 90+1'; Baibosynov (yellow card) 38'	Report	Zhaksybaev (yellow card) 27' (goal) 89'; Bushman (yellow card) 38'; Baibosynov (yellow card) 38'; Van Den Bogaert (yellow card) 43'; Cmiljanić 58' (yellow card) 90+2'	Stadium: Central Stadium; Attendance: 3,500; Referee: Danil Gorda

7 July 2024 2	Kyzylzhar	1–1	Kairat	Petropavl
17:00 (UTC+5)	Imnadze 36'; Brígido (yellow card) 44'; Saulet (yellow card) 55'; Khaseyn (yellow card) 77'; Bogdanovski (yellow card) 81'; Jovančić (yellow card) 83'	Report	Seydakhmet 17'; Gadrani (yellow card) 69'	Stadium: Karasai Stadium; Attendance: 1,500; Referee: Timur Kumashev

7 July 2024 2	Akzhayik	1–2	Taraz	Oral
17:00 (UTC+5)	Antipov 35'; Chirkov (yellow card) 82'	Report	Mukanbetzhanov 26'; Khaitmuratov 55'	Stadium: Petr Atoyan Stadium; Attendance: 200; Referee: Mikhail Bil'dinov

21 July 2024 3	Akzhayik	2–1	Kyzylzhar	Oral
17:00 (UTC+5)	Kubashev 12'; Zhaksybaev 40' (o.g.); Redzhepov (yellow card) 80'; Omarov (yellow card) 90+4'	Report	Sebai 90+4' (yellow card) 90+4'	Stadium: Petr Atoyan Stadium; Attendance: 1,000; Referee: Sergey Nozhenko

21 July 2024 3	Kairat	3–0	Taraz	Almaty
18:00 (UTC+5)	João Paulo 32'; Seydakhmet 45'; Ulshin 73'	Report	Asan (yellow card) 19'; Umirzakov (yellow card) 51'	Stadium: Central Stadium; Attendance: 4,578; Referee: Sayat Sulikanov

=== Group B ===
Pos	Team	Pld	W	D	L	GF	GA	GD	Pts	Qualification
1	Zhenis	3	2	0	1	4	2	+2	6	Advanced to Semifinals
2	Aktobe	3	2	0	1	4	3	+1	6	
3	Kaisar	3	1	0	2	5	4	+1	3	
4	Tobol	3	1	0	2	3	7	−4	3	

Updated to match(es) played on 21 July 2024. Source:

25 May 2024 1	Zhenis	2–0	Tobol	Karaganda
17:00 (UTC+5)	Volkov (yellow card) 9'; Belančić (yellow card) 14' (goal) 27'; Zulfiu (yellow card) 52'; Bidzinashvili (yellow card) 65'; Prokopenko 84'	Report	Galym (yellow card) 59'	Stadium: Shakhter Stadium; Attendance: 50; Referee: Saken Baimbet

25 May 2024 1	Aktobe	2–0	Kaisar	Aktobe
20:00 (UTC+5)	Vătăjelu (yellow card) 10'; Cevallos 29'; Samorodov (yellow card) 50' (goal) 68'	Report	Kalmuratov (yellow card) 17'; Tolegenov (yellow card) 81'; Sakhalbaev (yellow card) 82'	Stadium: Central Stadium; Attendance: 12,600; Referee: Aydin Tasybaev

6 July 2024 2	Tobol	2–0	Aktobe	Kostanay
18:00 (UTC+5)	Zhaylaubaev (yellow card) 9'; Tsonev 29'; Zhumadelov 47'; Galym (yellow card) 57'	Report		Stadium: Central Stadium; Attendance: 3,000; Referee: Rustam Omarov

6 July 2024 2	Kaisar	0–1	Zhenis	Kyzylorda
20:00 (UTC+5)	Zhalmukan (yellow card) 42'	Report	Kenzhebek 53'; Kalmykov (yellow card) 66'	Stadium: Gani Muratbayev Stadium; Attendance: 2,000; Referee: Sergey Nozhenko

21 July 2024 3	Aktobe	2–1	Zhenis	Aktobe
20:00 (UTC+5)	Umaniyazov (yellow card) 31'; Tevzadze 78' (o.g.); Cevallos 83'; Jean (yellow card) 85'; Umayev (yellow card) 90+4'; Samorodov (yellow card) 90+4'	Report	Silva (yellow card) 36'; Oliveira (yellow card) 50'; Pantsulaia 71'; Rom (yellow card) 90+4'	Stadium: Central Stadium; Attendance: 12,000; Referee: Denis Izmailov

21 July 2024 3	Kaisar	5–1	Tobol	Kyzylorda
20:00 (UTC+5)	Zhangylyshbay 3', 16'; Narzildayev 24'; Zhalmukan 36'; Torekul 47'; Kenesbek (yellow card) 68'; Kobuladze (yellow card) 79'	Report	Minaidarov 70' (pen.)	Stadium: Gani Muratbayev Stadium; Attendance: 3,000; Referee: Danil Gorda

=== Group C ===
Pos	Team	Pld	W	D	L	GF	GA	GD	Pts	Qualification
1	Elimai	3	2	1	0	8	2	+6	7	Advanced to Semifinals
2	Atyrau	3	1	1	1	2	3	−1	4	
3	Ordabasy	3	0	3	0	4	4	0	3	
4	Turan	3	0	1	2	2	7	−5	1	

Updated to match(es) played on 20 July 2024. Source:

25 May 2024 1	Atyrau	0–0	Ordabasy	Atyrau
18:00 (UTC+5)	Dzhumatov (red card) 77'; Signevich (yellow card) 83'	Report	Tungyshbayev (yellow card) 29'; Tagybergen (yellow card) 88'; Makarenko (yellow card) 90+2'	Stadium: Munaishy Stadium; Attendance: 6,500; Referee: Sayat Karabaev

25 May 2024 1	Elimai	3–0	Turan	Semey
20:00 (UTC+5)	Šaravanja (yellow card) 17'; Sviridov 20'; Payruz 55'; Thioub 82' (yellow card) 90+1'	Report	Dmitrijev (yellow card) 23'; Arkhipov (yellow card) 33' (yellow-red card) 33'; Sokolenko (yellow card) 90+1'	Stadium: Spartak Stadium; Attendance: 8,000; Referee: Arman Ismuratov

5 July 2024 2	Turan	0–2	Atyrau	Turkistan
20:00 (UTC+5)	Nikolić (yellow card) 18'; Cuckić (yellow card) 57'; Jakoliš (yellow card) 61'; Sanzhar Satanov (yellow card) 82'	Report	Oralbay 37'; Adil (yellow card) 90+2'; Zhagorov 90+6'	Stadium: Turkistan Arena; Attendance: 500; Referee: Sanzhar Iskakov

6 July 2024 2	Ordabasy	2–2	Elimai	Shymkent
20:00 (UTC+5)	Tungyshbayev (yellow card) 55'; Plastun (yellow card) 70'; Tursynbay 72', 88'; Malyi (yellow card) 74'	Report	China (yellow card) 41'; Nurgaliyev 54'; Payruz (yellow card) 65' (goal) 79'	Stadium: Kazhymukan Munaitpasov Stadium; Attendance: 2,500; Referee: Sayat Karabaev

20 July 2024 3	Elimai	3–0	Atyrau	Semey
20:00 (UTC+5)	Šaravanja (yellow card) 48'; Payruz 63'; China 85' (pen.) (yellow card) 90+7'; Penchikov 90+3'	Report	Oralbay (yellow card) 32'; Noyok (yellow card) 50'; Takulov (yellow card) 54'; Stepanov (yellow card) 90+7'	Stadium: Spartak Stadium; Attendance: 6,500; Referee: Daniyar Sakhi

20 July 2024 3	Turan	2–2	Ordabasy	Turkistan
20:00 (UTC+5)	Jakoliš 25' (yellow card) 90+6'; Mukashev 43'; Dmitrijev (red card) 50'; Khadzhiev (yellow card) 90'; Vasilyuchek (yellow card) 90+5'	Report	Darboe 1'; Zharynbetov 5'; Abiken (yellow card) 56'	Stadium: Turkistan Arena; Attendance: 1,500; Referee: Marat Iskakov

=== Group D ===
Pos	Team	Pld	W	D	L	GF	GA	GD	Pts	Qualification
1	Astana	3	2	0	1	10	4	+6	6	Advanced to Semifinals
2	Caspiy	3	2	0	1	3	6	−3	6	
3	Zhetysu	3	1	0	2	4	5	−1	3	
4	Shakhter Karagandy	3	1	0	2	4	6	−2	3	

Updated to match(es) played on 20 July 2024. Source:

26 May 2024 1	Zhetysu	2–1	Astana	Taldykorgan
17:00 (UTC+5)	Muzhikov 7'; Karaman (yellow card) 14'; Shramchenko 74'; Braga (yellow card) 90+1'	Report	Ahanonu 11'; Dosmagambetov (yellow card) 45'; Kuat (yellow card) 90+5'; Astanov (yellow card) 90+5'	Stadium: Zhetysu Stadium; Attendance: 2,500; Referee: Sanjar Iskakov

26 May 2024 1	Caspiy	1–0	Shakhter Karagandy	Zhanaozen
18:00 (UTC+5)	Zhumakhanov (yellow card) 43' (yellow-red card) 65'; Zhumabay (yellow card) 46'; Tolordava 88' (o.g.)	Report	Savkiv (yellow card) 18'; Bougnone (yellow card) 34'; Tyulyubay (yellow card) 58' (yellow-red card) 86'; Alishauskas (yellow card) 90+2'	Stadium: Amina Tuyakova Stadium; Attendance: 1,500; Referee: Sayat Sulikanov

7 July 2024 2	Astana	5–0	Caspiy	Almaty
20:00 (UTC+5)	Ahanonu 18'; Astanov 36'; Kažukolovas (yellow card) 41'; Osei (yellow card) 53'; Bartolec 62'; Tomasov 79'; Basmanov 82'; Marochkin (yellow card) 82'	Report	Khalmatov (yellow card) 51'	Stadium: Khan Taniri Stadium; Attendance: 750; Referee: Kirill Tkachev

7 July 2024 2	Shakhter Karagandy	2–1	Zhetysu	Karaganda
20:00 (UTC+5)	Đokić 4'; Cañas 38'; Stamenković (yellow card) 63'; Savkiv (yellow card) 67'	Report	Zhumabek 10'; Karaman (yellow card) 44'; Charleston (yellow card) 63'; Braga (yellow card) 90+6'	Stadium: Shakhter Stadium; Attendance: 1,500; Referee: Daniyar Sakhi

19 July 2024 3	Shakhter Karagandy	2–4	Astana	Karaganda
17:00 (UTC+5)	Kozlov 6'; Cañas 36' (yellow card) 52'; Ilic (yellow card) 73'	Report	Chinedu 13', 30' (pen.), 78'; Amanović (yellow card) 41'; Gripshi 48'; Tomasov (yellow card) 65'	Stadium: Shakhter Stadium; Attendance: 3,000; Referee: Alexander Zatula

20 July 2024 3	Caspiy	2–1	Zhetysu	Zhanaozen
18:00 (UTC+5)	Zhumakhanov 17'; Marat (yellow card) 62' (red card) 75'; Konlimkos 67'; Shamshi (yellow card) 74'; Dmitrenko (yellow card) 90+4'	Report	Orynbasar (yellow card) 6'; Taipi (yellow card) 13'; Muzhikov (yellow card) 68'; Usenov 71'	Stadium: Amina Tuyakova Stadium; Attendance: 500; Referee: Denis Tevyashov

== Semi-finals ==
10 August 2024	Zhenis	2–0	Kairat	Karaganda
18:00 (UTC+5)	Belančić 13'; Pantsulaia 22'; Tevzadze (yellow card) 32'; Sovet (yellow card) 36'; Oliveira (red card) 45+3'	Report	Seydakhmet (yellow card) 10'; Gromyko (yellow card) 49'; Arad (yellow card) 55'	Stadium: Shakhter Stadium; Attendance: 600; Referee: Grigory Moskovchenko

25 September 2024	Kairat	2–0 (2–2 agg.) (2–3 p)	Zhenis	Almaty
19:00 (UTC+5)	Zaria 32', 53' (yellow card) 45'; Kasabulat (yellow card) 74'; Shvyryov (yellow card) 113'	Report	Volkov (yellow card) 68'	Stadium: Central Stadium; Attendance: 2,500; Referee: Alexander Zatula
	Penalties
	Zaria (penalty scored); João Paulo (penalty scored); Ulshin (penalty missed); Martynovich (penalty missed); Seydakhmet (penalty missed)		(penalty scored) Tevzadze; (penalty scored) Silva; (penalty scored) Grechikho; (penalty missed) Belančić

11 August 2024	Elimai	0–0	Astana	Semey
20:00 (UTC+5)	Yashin (red card) 70'; Shomko (yellow card) 90+2'	Report		Stadium: Spartak Stadium; Attendance: 7,000; Referee: Denis Izmailov

25 September 2024	Astana	0–0 (a.e.t.) (0–0 agg.) (3–1 p)	Elimai	Astana
19:00 (UTC+5)	Bystrov (yellow card) 69'; Osei (yellow card) 84'; Kalaica (yellow card) 102'	Report	Pertsukh (red card) 105'	Stadium: Astana Arena; Attendance: 800; Referee: Ruslan Sultangaliev
	Penalties
	Karimov (penalty scored); Astanov (penalty scored); Amanović (penalty missed); Kalaica (penalty scored)		(penalty missed) China; (penalty missed) Darabayev; (penalty missed) Mashukov; (penalty scored) Reyes

== Final ==
23 November 2024	Zhenis	0–2	Astana	Turkistan
15:00 (UTC+5)	Oliveira (yellow card) 56'	Report	Amanović (yellow card) 57'; Ebong (yellow card) 68'; Camara (yellow card) 78' (goal) 120+2'; Vorogovsky (yellow card) 97'; Bartolec 105'; Kažukolovas (yellow card) 111'; Kuat (yellow card) 117'	Stadium: Turkistan Arena; Attendance: 5,000; Referee: Sanzhar Iskakov

== Statistics ==
As of matches played on 23 November 2024

=== Goal scorers ===
4 goals:

- (Brazil) João Paulo - Kairat

3 goals:

- (Nigeria) Geoffrey Chinedu - Astana
- (Kazakhstan) Zhan-Ali Payruz - Elimai
- (Georgia (country)) Giorgi Zaria - Kairat

2 goals:

- (Ecuador) José Cevallos - Aktobe
- (Croatia) Karlo Bartolec - Astana
- (Nigeria) Nnamdi Ahanonu - Astana
- (Kazakhstan) Yerkebulan Seydakhmet - Kairat
- (Kazakhstan) Toktar Zhangylyshbay - Kaisar
- (Kazakhstan) Sagadat Tursynbay - Ordabasy
- (Kazakhstan) Abzal Mukanbetzhanov - Taraz
- (Croatia) Marin Belančić - Zhenis
- (Georgia (country)) Giorgi Pantsulaia - Zhenis

1 goals:

- (Kazakhstan) Maksim Samorodov - Aktobe
- (Kazakhstan) Ivan Antipov - Akzhayik
- (Kazakhstan) Chingiz Kubashev - Akzhayik
- (Albania) Nazmi Gripshi - Astana
- (Ghana) Barnes Osei - Astana
- (Guinea) Ousmane Camara - Astana
- (Kazakhstan) Elkhan Astanov - Astana
- (Kazakhstan) Stanislav Basmanov - Astana
- (Kazakhstan) Edige Oralbay - Atyrau
- (Kazakhstan) Nauryzbek Zhagorov - Atyrau
- (Kazakhstan) Bakdaulet Konlimkos - Caspiy
- (Kazakhstan) Sanat Zhumakhanov - Caspiy
- (Brazil) China - Elimai
- (Kazakhstan) Yerkebulan Nurgaliyev - Elimai
- (Kazakhstan) Ivan Sviridov - Elimai
- (Russia) Daniil Penchikov - Elimai
- (Senegal) Sada Thioub - Elimai
- (Brazil) Élder Santana - Kairat
- (Kazakhstan) Adilet Sadybekov - Kairat
- (Kazakhstan) Aleksandr Shirobokov - Kairat
- (Kazakhstan) Vyacheslav Shvyryov - Kairat
- (Kazakhstan) Andrey Ulshin - Kairat
- (Uzbekistan) Ibrokhimkhalil Yuldoshev - Kairat
- (Kazakhstan) Duman Narzildayev - Kaisar
- (Kazakhstan) Ersultan Torekul - Kaisar
- (Kazakhstan) Didar Zhalmukan - Kaisar
- (Georgia (country)) Luka Imnadze - Kyzylzhar
- (Ivory Coast) Senin Sebai - Kyzylzhar
- (Kazakhstan) Ular Zhaksybaev - Kyzylzhar
- (Montenegro) Boris Cmiljanić - Kyzylzhar
- (The Gambia) Dembo Darboe - Ordabasy
- (Kazakhstan) Samat Zharynbetov - Ordabasy
- (Colombia) Roger Cañas - Shakhter Karagandy
- (Serbia) Milan Đokić - Shakhter Karagandy
- (Kazakhstan) Ulugbek Khaitmuratov - Taraz
- (Bulgaria) Radoslav Tsonev - Tobol
- (Kazakhstan) Bekzat Minaidarov - Tobol
- (Kazakhstan) Nurbol Zhumadelov - Tobol
- (Croatia) Antonio Jakoliš - Turan
- (Kazakhstan) Batyr Mukashev - Turan
- (Kazakhstan) Galymzhan Kenzhebek - Zhenis
- (Kazakhstan) Vladislav Prokopenko - Zhenis
- (Belarus) Anton Shramchenko - Zhetysu
- (Kazakhstan) Serikzhan Muzhikov - Zhetysu
- (Kazakhstan) Daniyar Usenov - Zhetysu
- (Kazakhstan) Abylaykhan Zhumabek - Zhetysu

Own goal

- (Georgia (country)) Anton Tolordava - for Caspiy vs Shakhter Karagandy (26 May 2024)
- (Kazakhstan) Ular Zhaksybaev - for Akzhayik vs Kyzylzhar (21 July 2024)
- (Georgia (country)) Zurab Tevzadze - for Aktobe vs Zhenis (21 July 2024)

==== Hat-tricks ====
Player	For	Against	Result	Date	Ref.
(Brazil) João Paulo	Kairat	Akzhayik	9–0 (H)	26 May 2024	
(Nigeria) Geoffrey Chinedu	Astana	Shakhter Karagandy	4–2 (A)	19 July 2024	

=== Clean sheets ===
Rank	Player	Club	Clean sheets
1	(Kazakhstan) Mukhammedzhan Seysen	Astana	3
2	(Kazakhstan) Danil Ustimenko	Kairat	2
2	(Russia) Denis Kavlinov	Elimai	2
4	(Kazakhstan) Temirlan Anarbekov	Zhenis	1
4	(Kazakhstan) Nurasyl Tokhtarov	Atyrau	1
4	(Kazakhstan) Azamat Zhomartov	Ordabasy	1
4	(Kazakhstan) Igor Trofimets	Aktobe	1
4	(Kazakhstan) Aleksandr Mokin	Caspiy	1
4	(Kazakhstan) Nurasyl Tokhtarov	Atyrau	1
4	(Kazakhstan) Vladislav Saenko	Atyrau	1
4	(Kazakhstan) Sultan Busurmanov	Tobol	1
4	(Kazakhstan) Nikita Kalmykov	Zhenis	1
4	(Croatia) Josip Čondrić	Astana	1
4	(Russia) Miroslav Lobantsev	Zhenis	1
4	(Ukraine) Maksym Koval	Elimai	1
4	(Russia) Vadim Ulyanov	Kairat	1

=== Discipline ===
==== Red cards ====
- (Kazakhstan) Rinat Dzhumatov - Atyrau vs Ordabasy (25 May 2024)
- (Russia) Artyom Arkhipov - Elimai vs Turan (25 May 2024)
- (Kazakhstan) Miras Zhaksymbetov - Taraz vs Kyzylzhar (26 May 2024)
- (Kazakhstan) Sanat Zhumakhanov - Caspiy vs Shakhter Karagandy (26 May 2024)
- (Kazakhstan) Almas Tyulyubay - Caspiy vs Shakhter Karagandy (26 May 2024)
- (Kazakhstan) Damir Marat - Caspiy vs Zhetysu (20 July 2024)
- (Estonia) Artjom Dmitrijev - Turan vs Ordabasy (20 July 2024)
- (Portugal) João Oliveira - Zhenis vs Kairat (10 August 2024)
- (Russia) Dmitri Yashin - Elimai vs Astana (11 August 2024)
- (Kazakhstan) Yury Pertsukh - Astana vs Elimai (25 September 2024)
