= Giannis Masouras =

Greek footballer (born 1996)

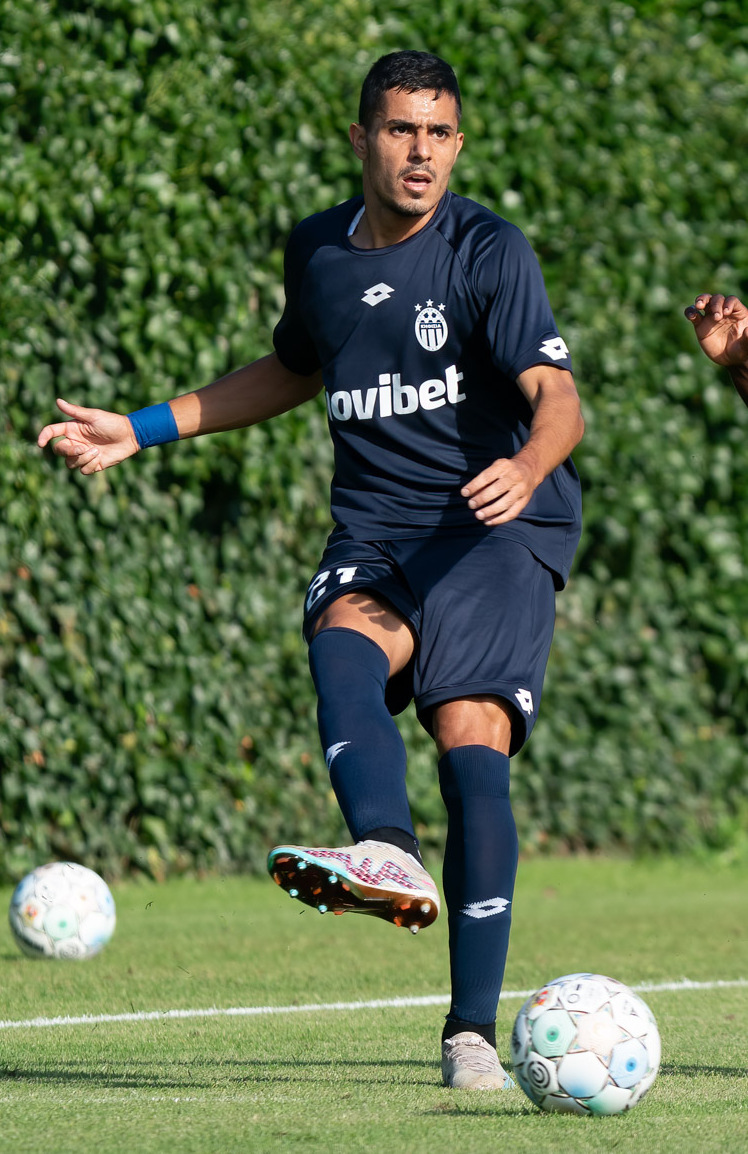

Personal information
- Full name: Ioannis Masouras
- Date of birth: 24 August 1996 (age 30)
- Place of birth: Patras, Greece
- Height: 1.81 m (5 ft 11 in)
- Position: Right-back

Team information
- Current team: 1. FC Nürnberg
- Number: 21

Youth career
- 2012–2013: Atromitos Patras
- 2013: Panachaiki

Senior career*
Years	Team	Apps	(Gls)
2013–2015	Panachaiki	13	(0)
2015–2018	AEL	39	(0)
2018–2023	Olympiacos	0	(0)
2019–2020	→ Panionios (loan)	20	(1)
2020	→ AEL (loan)	1	(0)
2020–2021	→ Górnik Zabrze (loan)	23	(0)
2021–2022	→ Sparta Rotterdam (loan)	18	(0)
2023	Miedź Legnica	14	(1)
2023–2024	A.E. Kifisia	19	(1)
2024	Astana	6	(0)
2024–2026	Omonia	45	(1)
2026–	1. FC Nürnberg	0	(0)

International career
2018	Greece U21	3	(0)
- * Club domestic league appearances and goals as of 22 May 2026

Giannis Masouras (Greek: Γιάννης Μασούρας; born 24 August 1996) is a Greek professional footballer who plays as a right-back for 2. Bundesliga club 1. FC Nürnberg.

== Career ==
=== Early years ===
Masouras started his career with his local Patras-based amateur club Atromitos Patras. On 1 July 2013 he signed his first professional contract with Football League club Panachaiki. He remained at the team for two seasons mostly playing for the youth squad, making a total of 13 league appearances. He also competed successfully in the track and field team of Panachaiki as a runner. On 23 July 2015, he signed a three-year contract with AEL for an undisclosed fee. The 21-year-old player scored three goals (all in Greek Football Cup) in 29 official performances in all domestic competitions during 2017–18 season.

=== Olympiacos ===
On 28 June 2018, he signed with Olympiacos for a reported fee of €1 million. AEL would retain a 10% resale rate for any future sale of the player to exceed a €1 million fee.

On 27 September 2018, he made his debut with the club in a 1–0 win Cup home game against Levadiakos.

On 4 February 2019, after Masouras was underutilized by manager Pedro Martins, he was allowed to join Panionios on loan for the remainder of the season. On 21 April 2019, Masouras opened the scoring in a 2–1 home win game against PAS Giannina. On the edge of the penalty area, the Olympiacos loanee thumped an unstoppable attempt into the top right corner to give Panionios the lead within seven minutes.

On 27 August 2019, his loan to Panionios was extended until the summer of 2020, but also rejoined AEL during the 2020–21 season.

On 26 August 2020, as Masouras was not in the plans of Olympiacos' coach Pedro Martins, he was sent on loan again, this time joining Ekstraklasa club Górnik Zabrze until the summer of 2021. On 1 September 2021, Eredivisie club Sparta Rotterdam announced the agreement with Olympiakos for a long season loan.

=== Miedź Legnica ===
On 4 January 2023, he left Olympiacos permanently and returned to Poland, signing a year-and-a-half deal with Miedź Legnica. On 19 May 2023, with the club already set for relegation with two matchdays left, he terminated his contract by mutual consent.

=== Astana ===
On 10 February 2024, Kazakhstan Premier League club Astana announced the signing of Masouras from A.E. Kifisia to a two-year contract. On 7 June 2024, Astana announced that Masouras had left the club by mutual agreement after failing to adapt to life in Kazakhstan.

=== 1. FC Nürnberg ===
On 23 May 2026, Masouras signed with 1. FC Nürnberg in Germany.

== Career statistics ==
As of match played 18 December 2025

Appearances and goals by club, season and competition
Club	Season	League			National cup (Note: Includes Greek Cup, Polish Cup, KNVB Cup, Kazakhstan Cup, Cypriot Cup)		Continental		Other		Total	
Club	Season	Division	Apps	Goals	Apps	Goals	Apps	Goals	Apps	Goals	Apps	Goals
Panachaiki	2013–14	Football League	2	0	0	0	—		—		2	0
Panachaiki	2014–15	Football League	11	0	1	0	—		—		12	0
Panachaiki	Total		13	0	1	0	—		—		14	0
AEL	2015–16	Football League	14	0	4	0	—		—		18	0
AEL	2016–17	Super League Greece	2	0	1	0	—		—		3	0
AEL	2017–18	Super League Greece	23	0	7	3	—		—		30	3
AEL	Total		39	0	12	3	—		—		51	3
Olympiacos	2018–19	Super League Greece	0	0	3	0	0	0	—		3	0
Panionios (loan)	2018–19	Super League Greece	7	1	1	0	—		—		8	1
Panionios (loan)	2019–20	Super League Greece	13	0	1	0	—		—		14	0
Panionios (loan)	Total		20	1	2	0	—		—		22	1
AEL (loan)	2019–20	Super League Greece	1	0	0	0	—		—		1	0
Górnik Zabrze (loan)	2020–21	Ekstraklasa	23	0	2	0	—		—		25	0
Sparta Rotterdam (loan)	2021–22	Eredivisie	18	0	1	0	—		—		19	0
Miedź Legnica	2022–23	Ekstraklasa	14	1	—		—		—		14	1
A.E. Kifisia	2023–24	Super League Greece	19	1	2	0	—		—		21	1
Astana	2024	Kazakhstan Premier League	6	0	2	0	—		1 (Note: Appearance in Kazakhstan League Cup)	0	9	0
Omonia	2024–25	Cypriot First Division	21	0	3	0	10 (Note: Appearances in UEFA Conference League)	0	—		34	0
Omonia	2025–26	Cypriot First Division	12	1	0	0	11	1	—		23	2
Omonia	Total		33	1	3	0	21	1	—		57	2
Career total			186	4	28	3	21	1	1	0	236	8

== Honours ==
Omonia

- Cypriot First Division: 2025–26
