= Khachim Mashukov =

Russian footballer (born 1995)

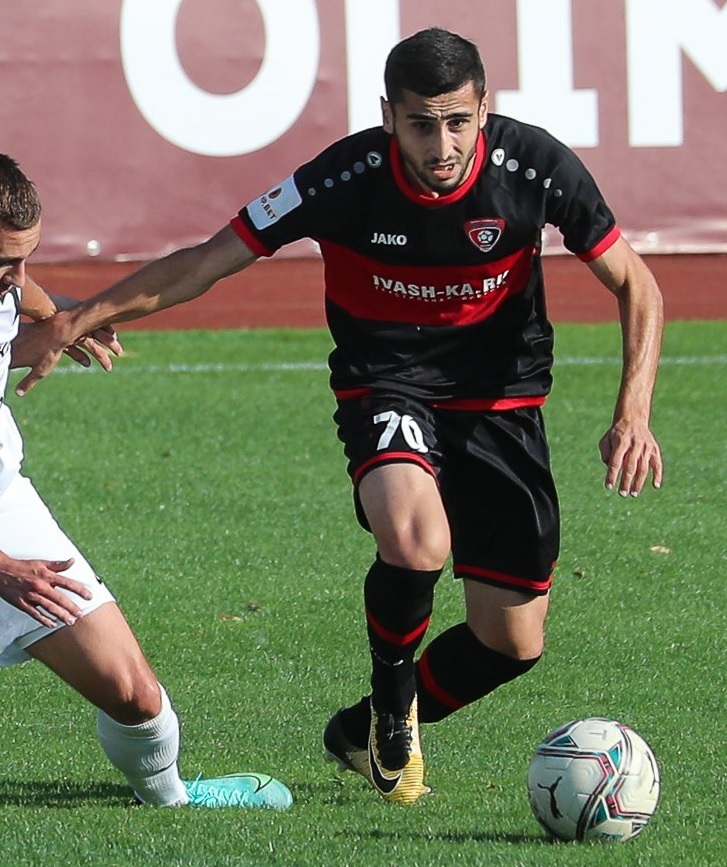
- Mashukov with Tekstilshchik Ivanovo in 2021

Personal information
- Full name: Khachim Amirkhanovich Mashukov
- Date of birth: 22 February 1995 (age 31)
- Place of birth: Nalchik, Russia
- Height: 1.78 m (5 ft 10 in)
- Position: Midfielder

Senior career*
Years	Team	Apps	(Gls)
2014–2015	PFC Spartak Nalchik	12	(0)
2016	FC Druzhba Maykop	9	(1)
2016	FC Chayka Peschanokopskoye	4	(0)
2017–2018	PFC Spartak Nalchik	44	(13)
2019–2020	FC Avangard Kursk	51	(6)
2021–2022	FC Tekstilshchik Ivanovo	48	(4)
2022	FC SKA Rostov-on-Don	18	(2)
2023	FC Forte Taganrog	1	(0)
2023–2024	FC Mashuk-KMV Pyatigorsk	13	(0)
2024	PFC Dynamo Stavropol	13	(2)
2024–2025	PFC Spartak Nalchik	27	(3)
Total		240	(31)
- * Club domestic league appearances and goals

Khachim Amirkhanovich Mashukov (Russian: Хачим Амирханович Машуков; born 22 February 1995) is a Russian former football player who played as a left midfielder.

== Club career ==
He made his professional debut in the Russian Professional Football League for PFC Spartak Nalchik on 19 October 2014 in a game against FC Anzhi-2 Makhachkala.

He made his Russian Football National League debut for FC Avangard Kursk on 3 March 2019 in a game against FC Baltika Kaliningrad.

== Personal life ==
He is an identical twin brother of Islam Mashukov.
