= Mokhammed Yensebayev =

Kazakhstani footballer (born 2005)

Personal information
- Full name: Mokhammed Askerbekuly Yensebayev
- Date of birth: 19 October 2005 (age 21)
- Place of birth: Almaty, Kazakhstan
- Height: 1.69 m (5 ft 7 in)
- Position: Midfielder

Team information
- Current team: Irtysh Pavlodar
- Number: 14

Youth career
- –2022: Kyran

Senior career*
| Years | Team | Apps | (Gls) |
| 2022 | Kyran | 13 | (3) |
| 2023–2024 | Yelimay | 16 | (2) |
| 2023 | Yelimay II | 6 | (3) |
| 2024–2025 | Real Valladolid B | 0 | (0) |
| 2025– | Irtysh Pavlodar | 0 | (0) |

International career^{‡}
| 2023– | Kazakhstan U19 | 6 | (0) |
- * Club domestic league appearances and goals as of 10 August 2025 ‡ National team caps and goals as of 28 March 2024

Mokhammed Askerbekuly Yensebayev (Kazakh: Мұхаммед Әскербекұлы Еңсебаев; born 19 October 2005) is a Kazakh footballer who plays for Irtysh Pavlodar.

== Career ==
Born in Almaty, Yensebayev was a youth product of Kyran. In 2023, he joined Yelimay and won the Kazakhstan First League, contributing 2 goals and 3 assists in the campaign.

Oj 30 April 2024, after a long trial at the Real Valladolid, Yensebayev joined the reserves side of the team, signing a three-year contract.

== Honours ==
Yelimay

- Kazakhstan First League: 2023
