= Islam Mashukov =

Russian footballer

Personal information
- Full name: Islam Amirkhanovich Mashukov
- Date of birth: 22 February 1995 (age 31)
- Place of birth: Nalchik, Russia
- Height: 1.85 m (6 ft 1 in)
- Position: Forward

Team information
- Current team: Neftekhimik Nizhnekamsk
- Number: 14

Senior career*
Years	Team	Apps	(Gls)
2013	Alania Vladikavkaz	11	(1)
2014–2015	SKA-Energiya Khabarovsk	17	(0)
2015–2016	Dila Gori	20	(5)
2016–2017	Volgar Astrakhan	29	(2)
2018	Orenburg	0	(0)
2018	→ Khimki (loan)	11	(1)
2018–2019	Spartak Nalchik	19	(11)
2019–2024	Alania Vladikavkaz	152	(52)
2024	Yelimay	12	(2)
2025	Andijon	9	(0)
2025–	Neftekhimik Nizhnekamsk	24	(3)
- * Club domestic league appearances and goals as of 16 May 2026

Islam Amirkhanovich Mashukov (Russian: Ислам Амирханович Машуков; born 22 February 1995) is a Russian football player who plays for Neftekhimik Nizhnekamsk.

== Career ==
He made his debut in the Russian Football National League for Alania Vladikavkaz on 5 September 2013 in a game against Mordovia Saransk.

== Personal life ==
He is an identical twin brother of Khachim Mashukov.

== Career statistics ==
As of 16 May 2026

Club	Season	League			Cup		Continental		Other		Total	
Club	Season	Division	Apps	Goals	Apps	Goals	Apps	Goals	Apps	Goals	Apps	Goals
Alania Vladikavkaz	2013–14	Russian First League	11	1	2	1	—		—		13	2
SKA-Energiya Khabarovsk	2013–14	Russian First League	10	0	—		—		2 (Note: Appearances in FNL Cup)	0	12	0
SKA-Energiya Khabarovsk	2014–15	Russian First League	7	0	0	0	—		2	0	9	0
SKA-Energiya Khabarovsk	Total		17	0	0	0	0	0	4	0	21	0
Dila Gori	2015–16	Erovnuli Liga	20	5	0	0	1 (Note: Appearance in the UEFA Champions League)	0	1 (Note: Appearance in Georgian Super Cup)	0	22	5
Volgar Astrakhan	2016–17	Russian First League	19	1	2	1	—		1	0	22	2
Volgar Astrakhan	2017–18	Russian First League	10	1	1	0	—		—		11	1
Volgar Astrakhan	Total		29	2	3	1	0	0	1	0	33	3
Khimki (loan)	2017–18	Russian First League	11	1	—		—		—		11	1
Spartak Nalchik	2018–19	Russian Second League	19	11	—		—		—		19	11
Alania Vladikavkaz	2019–20	Russian Second League	19	9	3	1	—		—		22	10
Alania Vladikavkaz	2020–21	Russian First League	37	8	0	0	—		—		37	8
Alania Vladikavkaz	2021–22	Russian First League	35	14	5	0	—		—		40	14
Alania Vladikavkaz	2022–23	Russian First League	28	7	0	0	—		—		28	7
Alania Vladikavkaz	2023–24	Russian First League	33	14	0	0	—		—		33	14
Alania Vladikavkaz	Total		152	52	8	1	0	0	0	0	160	53
Yelimay	2024	Kazakhstan Premier League	12	2	—		—		3 (Note: Appearances in Kazakhstan League Cup)	0	15	2
Andijon	2025	Uzbekistan Super League	9	0	3	0	—		1 (Note: Appearance in Uzbekistan Super Cup)	0	13	0
Neftekhimik Nizhnekamsk	2025–26	Russian First League	24	3	4	2	—		—		28	5
Career total			304	77	20	5	1	0	10	0	335	82
