= Edarlyn Reyes =

Dominican Republic footballer (born 1997)

Personal information
- Full name: Edarlyn Reyes Ureña
- Date of birth: 30 September 1997 (age 29)
- Place of birth: Hermanas Mirabal, Dominican Republic
- Height: 1.80 m (5 ft 11 in)
- Position: Winger

Team information
- Current team: Arsenal Tula
- Number: 7

Senior career*
Years	Team	Apps	(Gls)
2017–2018	Euro		
2018–2020	Cibao	20	(6)
2021–2022	Real Santa Cruz	28	(14)
2022	Emirates Club	8	(1)
2022–2023	Always Ready	41	(6)
2023–2024	Al-Ittihad Tripoli	12	(5)
2024–2025	Yelimay	12	(2)
2025–	Arsenal Tula	41	(7)

International career^{‡}
2019–2021	Dominican Republic U23	2	(1)
2018–	Dominican Republic	45	(5)
- * Club domestic league appearances and goals as of 30 September 2026 ‡ National team caps and goals as of 17 November 2026

Edarlyn Reyes Ureña (born 30 September 1997) is a Dominican professional footballer who plays as a winger for Russian First League club Arsenal Tula and the Dominican Republic national team.

He was the first Dominican player to score a goal in the Copa Libertadores, completing this feat in the 2023 edition.

== Club career ==
On 8 July 2024, Kazakhstan Premier League club FC Elimai announced the signing of Reyes from Al-Ittihad. On 10 December 2024, Elimai announced that Reyes had left the club.

On 12 January 2025, Russian First League club Arsenal Tula announced the signing of Reyes.

== International career ==
Reyes made his professional debut for the in a 3–0 win over Cayman Islands on 12 October 2018 for 2019–20 CONCACAF Nations League qualifying.

== Career statistics ==
=== Club ===
As of 29 September 2026

Appearances and goals by club, season and competition
Club	Season	League			National cup		Continental		Other		Total	
Club	Season	Division	Apps	Goals	Apps	Goals	Apps	Goals	Apps	Goals	Apps	Goals
Cibao	2018	Liga Dominicana de Fútbol										
Cibao	2019	Liga Dominicana de Fútbol	9	3							9	3
Cibao	2020	Liga Dominicana de Fútbol	11	3			2 (Note: Appearances in the CONCACAF Caribbean Cup)	0			13	3
Cibao	Total		20	6			2	0	0	0	22	6
Real Santa Cruz	2020	Bolivian Primera División	28	14							28	14
Emirates Club	2021	UAE Pro League	8	1							8	1
Always Ready	2022	Bolivian Primera División	20	3							20	3
Always Ready	2023	Bolivian Primera División	21	3			2 (Note: Appearances in Copa Libertadores)	1	6 (Note: Appearances in Copa de la División Profesional)	5	29	9
Always Ready	Total		41	6			2	1	6	5	49	12
Yelimay	2024	Kazakhstan Premier League	12	2					3 (Note: Appearances in Kazakhstan League Cup)	0	15	2
Arsenal Tula	2024-25	Russian First League	7	1	0	0	0	0	0	0	7	1
Arsenal Tula	2025–26	Russian First League	23	4	2	0	0	0	0	0	25	4
Arsenal Tula	2026–27	Russian First League	11	2	0	0	0	0	0	0	11	2
Arsenal Tula	Total		41	7	2	0	0	0	0	0	43	7
Career total			151	36	2	0	4	1	9	5	166	42

=== International ===
As of match played 17 November 2026

Appearances and goals by national team and year
National team	Year	Apps	Goals
Dominican Republic	2018	2	0
Dominican Republic	2019	9	0
Dominican Republic	2020	0	0
Dominican Republic	2021	4	0
Dominican Republic	2022	3	1
Dominican Republic	2023	8	3
Dominican Republic	2024	7	0
Dominican Republic	2025	7	1
Dominican Republic	2026	5	0
Total		45	5
