= Nikita Korzun =

Belarusian footballer

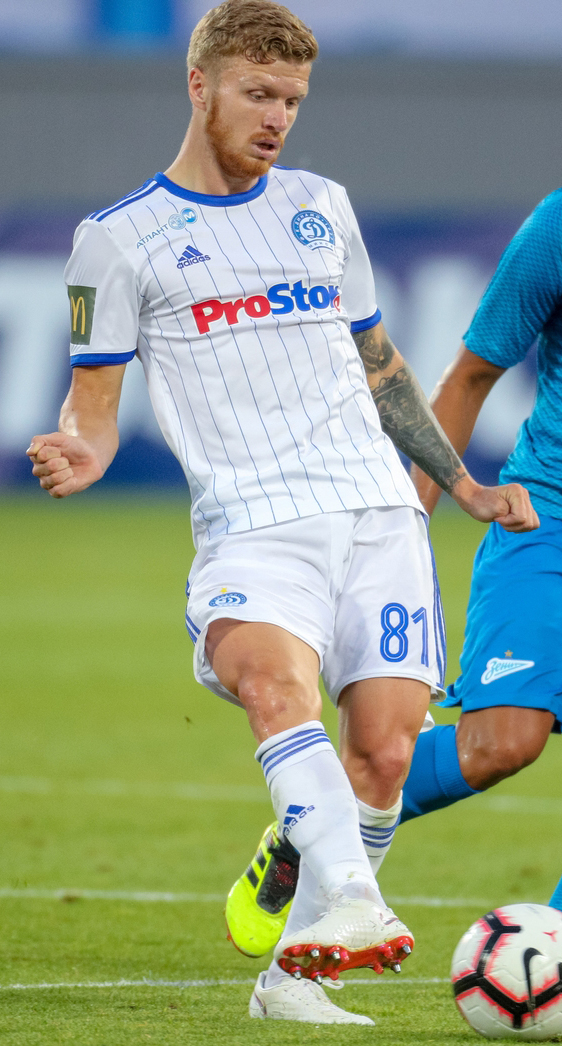

Personal information
- Full name: Nikita Ivanovich Korzun
- Date of birth: 6 March 1995 (age 31)
- Place of birth: Minsk, Belarus
- Height: 1.74 m (5 ft 8 1/2 in)
- Position: Midfielder

Team information
- Current team: Torpedo-BelAZ Zhodino
- Number: 18

Youth career
- 2010–2011: Dinamo Minsk

Senior career*
Years	Team	Apps	(Gls)
2012–2015	Dinamo Minsk	47	(0)
2016–2020	Dynamo Kyiv	20	(0)
2018	→ Dinamo Minsk (loan)	12	(1)
2019	→ Al-Fateh (loan)	11	(0)
2019–2020	→ Vilafranquense (loan)	12	(0)
2020–2023	Shakhtyor Soligorsk	59	(2)
2024–2025	Yelimay	32	(8)
2025–2026	Aktobe	15	(0)
2026–	Torpedo-BelAZ Zhodino	2	(0)

International career^{‡}
2011–2012	Belarus U17	5	(0)
2012–2013	Belarus U19	5	(1)
2013–2016	Belarus U21	14	(1)
2016–	Belarus	31	(0)
- * Club domestic league appearances and goals as of 5 September 2026 ‡ National team caps and goals as of 5 September 2025

Nikita Ivanovich Korzun (Belarusian: Мікіта Іванавіч Корзун; Russian: Никита Иванович Корзун; born 6 March 1995) is a Belarusian professional football player who plays for Torpedo-BelAZ Zhodino and for the Belarus national team.

== Club career ==
=== Dinamo Minsk ===
A product of the Dinamo Minsk youth system, Korzun made his senior debut on 17 November 2012, when he came on as a stoppage-time substitute in a 2–0 away victory against FC Torpedo-BelAZ Zhodino. Over the next 3 seasons, he went on to make 67 appearances for the club across all tournaments.

=== Dynamo Kyiv ===
On 1 February 2016, Korzun signed a 5-year contract with Ukrainian club Dynamo Kyiv. However, he struggled to win a regular place in the side, and didn't make his debut until 14 May 2016 (4-1 road victory against FC Metalist Kharkiv). Over the next two seasons, Korzun played sparingly, mostly as a substitute.

On 24 July 2018, it was announced that Korzun would return to Dinamo Minsk on loan, until the end of the season.

In January 2019, he joined Saudi team Al-Fateh on loan until January 2020.

== International career ==
Korzun represented Belarus at all levels of youth football. He made his senior team debut on 27 May 2016 in Belfast, in a 3-0 friendly loss to Northern Ireland.

== Honours ==
=== Club ===
Dynamo Kyiv

- Ukrainian Premier League: 2015–16
- Ukrainian Super Cup: 2016

Shakhtyor Soligorsk

- Belarusian Premier League: 2020, 2021
- Belarusian Super Cup: 2021, 2023
