= Ivan Sviridov =

Kazakhstani footballer

Personal information
- Full name: Ivan Nikolayevich Sviridov
- Date of birth: 28 June 2002 (age 24)
- Place of birth: Temirtau, Kazakhstan
- Height: 1.84 m (6 ft 0 in)
- Positions: Striker; right winger

Team information
- Current team: Yelimay
- Number: 11

Youth career
- –2018: Shakhter Karagandy

Senior career*
Years	Team	Apps	(Gls)
2018–2019	Astana	0	(0)
2018–2019	Astana II	20	(0)
2020–2023	Shakhter Karagandy	44	(8)
2020–2021	Shakhter Karagandy II	2	(0)
2020	→ Shakhter-Bulat (loan)	4	(0)
2021–2022	→ Shakhter-Bulat (loan)	22	(4)
2024–	Yelimay	74	(13)

International career^{‡}
2018	Kazakhstan U16	3	(2)
2023–	Kazakhstan U21	8	(0)
2023–	Kazakhstan	6	(0)
- * Club domestic league appearances and goals as of 1 November 2026 ‡ National team caps and goals as of 25 March 2026

Ivan Nikolayevich Sviridov (Russian: Иван Николаевич Свиридов; born 28 June 2002) is a Kazakh professional footballer who plays as a striker or right winger for Kazakhstan Premier League club Yelimay, and the Kazakhstan national team.

== Club career ==
Born in Temirtau, Sviridov spent his youth career playing for local team Shakhter Karagandy, before joining Astana in 2018. Here, he began his senior career with the club's reserve team in the Kazakhstan Second League.

In 2020, Sviridov made his comeback to Shakhter Karagandy and made his professional debut on 24 May 2021, in a 0–3 defeat against Tobol in the Kazakhstan Premier League. On 2 July 2021, in a match against his former club Astana, he scored his goal in professional level. In the 2023 season, he was the best goalscorer of his team, netting 7 goals after 23 games.

In January 2024, Sviridov signed for Kazakhstan Premier League fellow Yelimay as a free agent.

== International career ==
On 20 November 2023, Sviridov made his international debut with Kazakhstan as a substitute, entering the field in the 81st minute in a 1–2 away defeat against Slovenia, as part of the UEFA Euro 2024 qualifying.

== Career statistics ==
=== International ===
As of matches played 15 November 2025

National team	Year	Apps	Goals
Kazakhstan	2023	1	0
Kazakhstan	2024	1	0
Kazakhstan	2025	3	0
Total		5	0
