= Ivan Šaravanja =

Bosnian association footballer

Personal information
- Date of birth: 24 August 1996 (age 30)
- Place of birth: Mostar, Bosnia and Herzegovina
- Height: 1.88 m (6 ft 2 in)
- Position: Centre-back

Team information
- Current team: Jenis
- Number: 63

Senior career*
Years	Team	Apps	(Gls)
2015–2016	Brotnjo		
2016–2018	Admira II	43	(3)
2018–2021	Austria Klagenfurt II	8	(0)
2018–2022	Austria Klagenfurt	85	(3)
2022–2023	Akritas Chlorakas	27	(0)
2023–2024	Široki Brijeg	16	(0)
2024	Yelimay	9	(0)
2025–	Jenis	46	(1)
- * Club domestic league appearances and goals as of 1 November 2026

Ivan Šaravanja (born 24 August 1996) is a Bosnian professional footballer who plays as a centre-back for Kazakhstani club Jenis.

== Career ==
Šaravanja began his senior career with the Bosnian club Brotnjo, before moving to the reserves of Admira in 2016. On 16 June 2018, he transferred to Austria Klagenfurt and helped them get promoted into the Austrian Football Bundesliga. He made his professional debut with Austria Klagenfurt in a 1–1 2. Liga tie with Austria Lustenau on 27 August 2018. On 3 July 2021, he joined the Cypriot club Akritas Chlorakas on a free transfer.
