= Sada Thioub =

Footballer (born 1995)

Personal information
- Date of birth: 1 June 1995 (age 31)
- Place of birth: Nanterre, France
- Height: 1.79 m (5 ft 10 in)
- Position: Winger

Team information
- Current team: Yelimay
- Number: 9

Youth career
- –2013: Caen
- 2013–2015: Nice

Senior career*
Years	Team	Apps	(Gls)
2012–2013	Caen B	2	(0)
2013–2015	Nice B	36	(7)
2015	Nice	2	(0)
2015–2016	Guingamp	0	(0)
2015–2016	→ CA Bastia (loan)	28	(6)
2016–2019	Nîmes	99	(11)
2016	Nîmes B	5	(3)
2019–2023	Angers B	5	(0)
2019–2023	Angers	78	(3)
2022	→ Saint-Étienne (loan)	17	(0)
2024–	Yelimay	7	(1)

International career^{‡}
2019	Senegal	7	(0)
Medal record
Africa Cup of Nations
Runner-up	2019 Egypt
- * Club domestic league appearances and goals as of 6 April 2024 ‡ National team caps and goals as of 19:46, 27 June 2022 (UTC)

Sada Thioub (born 1 June 1995) is a professional footballer who plays as a winger for Kazakhstani club Yelimay. Born in France, he played for the Senegal national team.

== Club career ==
Thioub is a youth exponent from Nice. He made his Ligue 1 debut for the club on 23 January 2015 against Marseille, replacing Niklas Hult after 89 minutes in a 2–1 home win.

On 6 January 2022, Thioub signed for Saint-Étienne on loan until the end of the 2021–22 season.

== International career ==
On 27 February 2019, Thioub was called up to the Senegal national team. He was one of four young Senegalese players to receive a debut call-up to the national team. He made his debut on 23 March 2019 in an Africa Cup of Nations qualifier against Madagascar, as an 86th-minute substitute for Ismaïla Sarr.

== Personal life ==
Thioub was born and raised in Nanterre, France. He is Senegalese by descent.

== Career statistics ==
=== International ===
As of match played 17 November 2019

National team	Year	Apps	Goals
Senegal	2019	7	0
Total		7	0
