= Daniil Penchikov =

Russian footballer (born 1998)

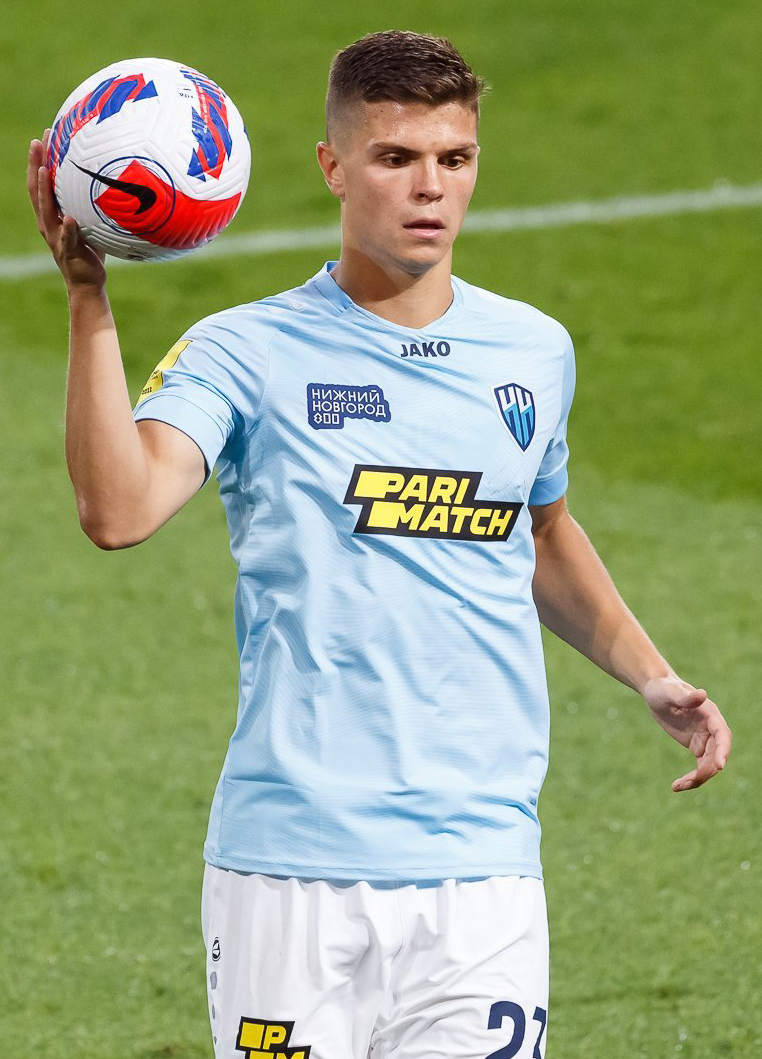
- Penchikov with Nizhny Novgorod in 2021

Personal information
- Full name: Daniil Aleksandrovich Penchikov
- Date of birth: 21 March 1998 (age 28)
- Place of birth: Saint Petersburg, Russia
- Height: 1.84 m (6 ft 0 in)
- Positions: Left-back; right-back

Team information
- Current team: Arsenal Tula
- Number: 4

Youth career
- –2017: Zenit St. Petersburg

Senior career*
Years	Team	Apps	(Gls)
2017–2019	Zenit-2 St. Petersburg	45	(1)
2019–2021	Tom Tomsk	53	(2)
2021–2024	Pari NN	16	(0)
2023	→ Aktobe (loan)	10	(0)
2024	Pari NN-2	4	(0)
2024	Elimai	11	(0)
2025–	Arsenal Tula	37	(5)
2025	Arsenal-2 Tula	1	(0)
- * Club domestic league appearances and goals as of 16 May 2026

Daniil Aleksandrovich Penchikov (Russian: Даниил Александрович Пенчиков; born 21 March 1998) is a Russian football player who plays for Arsenal Tula. His positions are right back and left back.

== Club career ==
He made his debut in the Russian Football National League for Zenit-2 St. Petersburg on 8 July 2017 in a game against Shinnik Yaroslavl.

On 16 July 2021 he joined Russian Premier League club Nizhny Novgorod, reuniting with Aleksandr Kerzhakov who coached him at Tom Tomsk in the previous season. He made his RPL debut for Nizhny Novgorod on 1 August 2021 in a game against Ural Yekaterinburg.

On 10 February 2023, Penchikov was loaned to Aktobe in Kazakhstan until 30 November 2023.

On 28 June 2024, Penchikov returned to Kazakhstan and signed with Elimai.

== Career statistics ==
As of 21 May 2022

Club	Season	League			Cup		Continental		Other		Total	
Club	Season	Division	Apps	Goals	Apps	Goals	Apps	Goals	Apps	Goals	Apps	Goals
Zenit-2 St. Petersburg	2016–17	FNL	0	0	–		–		1 (Note: Appearance in the FNL Cup)	0	1	0
Zenit-2 St. Petersburg	2017–18	FNL	26	0	–		–		–		26	0
Zenit-2 St. Petersburg	2018–19	FNL	19	1	–		–		–		19	1
Zenit-2 St. Petersburg	Total		45	1	0	0	0	0	1	0	46	1
Tom Tomsk	2018–19	FNL	10	0	–		–		2 (Note: Appearances in the promotion play-offs)	0	12	0
Tom Tomsk	2019–20	FNL	20	0	3	0	–		–		23	0
Tom Tomsk	2020–21	FNL	23	2	0	0	–		–		23	2
Tom Tomsk	Total		53	2	3	0	0	0	2	0	58	2
Nizhny Novgorod	2021–22	RPL	12	0	2	0	–		–		14	0
Nizhny Novgorod	2022–23	RPL	4	0	4	0	–		–		8	0
Nizhny Novgorod	Total		16	0	6	0	0	0	0	0	22	0
Career total			114	3	9	0	0	0	3	0	126	3
