= João Oliveira (footballer, born 1992) =

Portuguese footballer

Personal information
- Full name: João Ribeiro Oliveira
- Date of birth: 3 January 1992 (age 34)
- Place of birth: Braga, Portugal
- Height: 1.86 m (6 ft 1 in)
- Position: Midfielder

Team information
- Current team: Académica de Coimbra
- Number: 60

Youth career
- 2004–2006: Sporting Braga
- 2006–2007: Moreirense
- 2007–2008: Amares
- 2008–2009: Vizela
- 2009–2010: Sporting
- 2010–2011: Sporting Braga

Senior career*
Years	Team	Apps	(Gls)
2011–2013	Vilaverdense	47	(5)
2013–2014	Salgueiros 08	25	(1)
2014–2015	Vilaverdense	28	(3)
2015–2017	Olhanense	66	(3)
2017–2019	Vizela	47	(1)
2019–2020	Académico Viseu	18	(1)
2020–2022	Zagłębie Sosnowiec	55	(9)
2022–2024	Penafiel	48	(4)
2024–2025	Zhenis	10	(0)
2025–2026	Fafe	41	(3)
2026–	Académica de Coimbra	5	(0)
- * Club domestic league appearances and goals as of 11 September 2026

João Ribeiro Oliveira (born 3 January 1992) is a Portuguese professional footballer who plays for Liga Portugal 2 club Académica de Coimbra as a midfielder.

== Football career ==
On 2 August 2015, Oliveira made his professional debut with Olhanense in a 2015–16 Taça da Liga match against Penafiel.

On 30 July 2020, Oliveira signed a two-year contract with Polish club Zagłębie Sosnowiec.
