= Dmitri Yashin (footballer, born 1993) =

Russian footballer

Personal information
- Full name: Dmitri Valeryevich Yashin
- Date of birth: 25 April 1993 (age 33)
- Place of birth: Pokhvistnevo, Samara Oblast, Russia
- Height: 1.81 m (5 ft 11 1/2 in)
- Position: Defender

Team information
- Current team: Slavia Mozyr
- Number: 88

Youth career
- 2012–2014: Terek Grozny

Senior career*
Years	Team	Apps	(Gls)
2013–2016	Terek Grozny	0	(0)
2013–2014	→ Terek-2 Grozny (loan)	2	(0)
2014	→ Sokol Saratov (loan)	1	(0)
2015	→ Oryol (loan)	6	(0)
2015	→ Baikal Irkutsk (loan)	16	(2)
2016	→ Krumkachy Minsk (loan)	25	(0)
2017	Krumkachy Minsk	12	(0)
2017–2018	Gandzasar Kapan	24	(2)
2018	Luch Minsk	11	(1)
2019	Dnyapro Mogilev	26	(0)
2020–2022	Torpedo-BelAZ Zhodino	67	(1)
2023	Aktobe	15	(0)
2024	Yelimay	20	(1)
2025	Kuban Krasnodar	11	(0)
2025–2026	Mash'al	15	(0)
2026	Atyrau	0	(0)
2026–	Slavia Mozyr	7	(1)
- * Club domestic league appearances and goals as of 4 September 2026

Dmitri Valeryevich Yashin (Russian: Дмитрий Валерьевич Яшин; born 25 April 1993) is a Russian football player for Belarusian Premier League club Slavia Mozyr.

== Club career ==
He made his professional debut in the Russian Professional Football League for FC Terek-2 Grozny on 22 July 2013 in a game against FC Olimpia Volgograd.
