= Marko Nikolić (footballer, born 1998) =

Serbian footballer

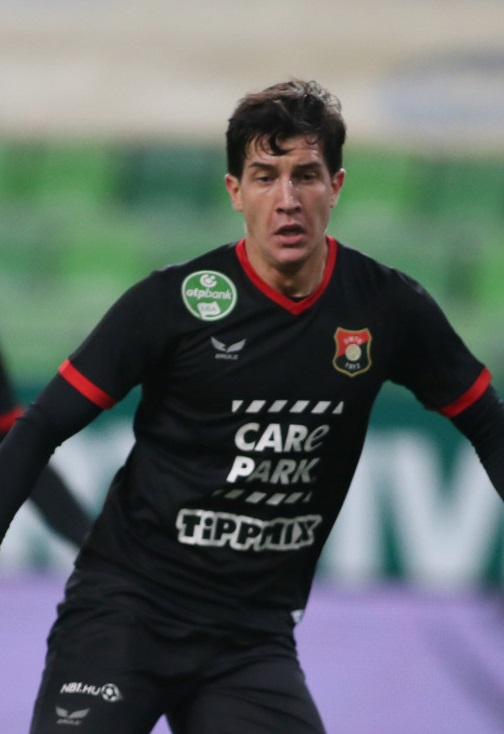
- Nikolić playing for Budafok in 2020

Personal information
- Date of birth: 31 March 1998 (age 28)
- Place of birth: Belgrade, Yugoslavia
- Height: 1.89 m (6 ft 2 in)
- Position: Centre-back

Team information
- Current team: BG Pathum United
- Number: 44

Youth career
- 2015–2017: Brodarac
- 2017: Novi Banovci

Senior career*
Years	Team	Apps	(Gls)
2017–2018	Zemun	0	(0)
2017	→ Inđija (loan)	19	(0)
2018	Arsenal Kyiv	4	(0)
2019–2020	Rad	17	(1)
2020–2021	Budafok	16	(0)
2021–2022	Debrecen	8	(0)
2022	Riteriai	6	(0)
2023–2024	Aksu	11	(0)
2024	Turan	22	(0)
2025	Sabail	13	(1)
2025–2026	Mačva Šabac	30	(5)
2026–	BG Pathum United	0	(0)
- * Club domestic league appearances and goals as of 14 May 2026

Marko Nikolić (born 31 March 1998) is a Serbian professional footballer who plays for BG Pathum United in Thai League 1.

== Career ==
On January 6, 2025, Azerbaijan Premier League club Sabail signed a 1.5-year contract with Nikolic.

== Career statistics ==
As of 15 May 2022.

Appearances and goals by club, season and competition
Club	Season	League			Cup		Continental		Other		Total	
Club	Season	Division	Apps	Goals	Apps	Goals	Apps	Goals	Apps	Goals	Apps	Goals
Inđija	2017–18	Serbian First League	19	0	1	0	—		—		20	0
Inđija	Total		19	0	1	0	0	0	0	0	20	0
Arsenal Kyiv	2018–19	Ukrainian Premier League	4	0	0	0	—		—		4	0
Arsenal Kyiv	Total		19	0	1	0	0	0	0	0	20	0
Rad	2019–20	Serbian SuperLiga	17	1	1	0	—		—		18	1
Rad	Total		17	1	1	0	0	0	0	0	18	1
Budafok	2020–21	Nemzeti Bajnokság I	16	0	5	0	—		—		21	0
Budafok	Total		16	0	5	0	0	0	0	0	21	0
Debrecen	2021–22	Nemzeti Bajnokság I	8	0	2	1	—		—		10	1
Debrecen	Total		8	0	2	1	0	0	0	0	10	1
Career total			64	1	9	1	0	0	0	0	73	2
