= Yerkebulan Nurgaliyev =

Kazakhstani footballer

Personal information
- Full name: Yerkebulan Sabyruly Nurgaliyev
- Date of birth: 12 September 1993 (age 33)
- Place of birth: Semipalatinsk, Kazakhstan
- Height: 1.86 m (6 ft 1 in)
- Position: Midfielder

Team information
- Current team: Okzhetpes
- Number: 10

Senior career*
Years	Team	Apps	(Gls)
2012–2014	Spartak Semey	43	(3)
2015	Irtysh Pavlodar	8	(0)
2016	Altai Semey		(0)
2017	Okzhetpes	1	(0)
2017	→ Vereya (loan)	8	(0)
2018	Akzhayik	28	(3)
2019–2020	Shakhter Karagandy	30	(4)
2020–2021	Caspiy	12	(0)
2021	Aktobe	13	(1)
2022	Caspiy	15	(1)
2023–2024	Yelimay	41	(17)
2025	Caspiy	14	(4)
2026–	Okzhetpes	22	(2)

International career
2010–2013	Kazakhstan U19	3	(0)
- * Club domestic league appearances and goals as of 1 November 2026

Yerkebulan Sabyruly Nurgaliyev (Kazakh: Еркебұлан Сабырұлы Нұрғалиев; born 12 September 1993) is a Kazakhstani footballer who plays as a midfielder for Okzhetpes.

== Career ==
=== Club ===
In January 2018, Nurgaliyev signed for Akzhayik.

On 6 December 2018, Nurgaliyev signed a one-year contract with Shakhter Karagandy.
