= Artjom Dmitrijev =

Estonian footballer

Personal information
- Full name: Artjom Dmitrijev
- Date of birth: 14 November 1988 (age 38)
- Place of birth: Tallinn, then part of Estonian SSR, Soviet Union
- Height: 1.84 m (6 ft 0 in)
- Position: Midfielder

Team information
- Current team: FC Tallinn
- Number: 10

Youth career
- 2002: Levadia
- 2003–2006: TVMK

Senior career*
Years	Team	Apps	(Gls)
2004–2008	TVMK II	112	(45)
2006–2008	TVMK	40	(15)
2009	Vėtra Vilnius	6	(1)
2009	Flora Rakvere	1	(0)
2009	Narva Trans	7	(2)
2010	Levadia II	8	(9)
2010	Levadia	25	(7)
2011	Kruoja Pakruojis	13	(1)
2011	Sillamäe Kalev II	1	(1)
2011	Sillamäe Kalev	11	(10)
2012–2013	Antwerp	6	(1)
2012–2013	→ Turnhout (loan)	28	(15)
2013–2014	Turnhout	24	(5)
2014	Infonet II	6	(6)
2014	Infonet	5	(0)
2015–2017	Nõmme Kalju	92	(21)
2018	FC Lahti	25	(3)
2019–2021	Okzhetpes	46	(10)
2021	Zhetysu	24	(4)
2022	Qizilqum Zarafshon	21	(0)
2023–2024	Nõmme Kalju	15	(1)
2024	Turan	23	(1)
2024–2025	Maardu Linnameeskond	11	(1)
2025–	FC Tallinn	41	(3)

International career^{‡}
2007–2010	Estonia U21	15	(0)
2010–2011	Estonia U23	3	(1)
2015–2019	Estonia	24	(0)
- * Club domestic league appearances and goals as of 17 November 2026 ‡ National team caps and goals as of 5 March 2022

Artjom Dmitrijev (born 14 November 1988) is an Estonian professional footballer who plays as a midfielder for Esiliiga club FC Tallinn, and formerly the Estonia national team.

== Career ==
=== Club ===
On 22 January 2019, FC Okzhetpes announced the signing of Dmitrijev.

=== International ===
Dmitrijev made his senior international debut for the Estonia on 9 June 2015, replacing Sergei Zenjov in the 79th minute of a 2–0 away victory over Finland in a friendly.

== Honours ==
Levadia

- Estonian Cup: 2009–10
- Estonian Supercup: 2010

Nõmme Kalju

- Estonian Cup: 2014–15
