= Kazakhstan League Cup =

- Organiser(s): Football Federation of Kazakhstan
- Founded: 2024
- Region: Kazakhstan
- Teams: 16 (2024 season)
- Current champions: Astana
- Most championships: Astana (1 title)
- 2026 Kazakhstan League Cup

The Kazakhstan League Cup (known as the 1XBet League Cup for sponsorship reasons) is an annual club football competition organized by the Football Federation of Kazakhstan for teams competing in the top two tiers of Kazakh football – the Kazakhstan Premier League and Kazakhstan First League.

The competition was inaugurated in 2024 with the aim of fostering the growth and commercialization of professional football in the country. Astana became the first winners, defeating Zhenis 2–0 in the maiden final held in November 2024.

== Finals ==
Season	Winners	Score	Runners-up	Date	Venue
2024	Astana	2–0	Zhenis	23 November 2024	Turkistan Arena, Turkistan
