= 2024 Kazakhstan Premier League =

Kazakhstan Premier League
- Season: 2024
- Dates: 1 March – 10 November 2024
- Champions: Kairat Almaty
- Relegated: Shakhter Karagandy
- Champions League: Kairat Almaty
- Europa League: Aktobe
- Conference League: Astana; Ordabasy
- Matches: 156
- Goals: 369 (2.37 per match)
- Top goalscorer: Islam Chesnokov (10)
- Biggest home win: Elimai 6–0 Turan (17 August 2024); Kairat 5–1 Turan (20 October 2024); Kyzylzhar 6–2 Kaisar (2 November 2024)
- Biggest away win: Kaisar 0–3 Kyzylzhar (6 March 2024); Aktobe 1–3 Elimai (31 August 2024); Elimai 0–3 Astana (20 October 2024)
- Highest scoring: Aktobe 3–4 Tobol
- Longest winning run: 2 matches Ordabasy; Tobol; Aktobe; Yelimay
- Longest unbeaten run: 8 matches Astana
- Longest winless run: 14 matches Shakhter Karagandy
- Longest losing run: 3 matches Turan; Zhenis
- Highest attendance: 22,804 - Kairat vs Aktobe (20 April 2024)
- Lowest attendance: 100 - Zhenis vs Turan (20 April 2024)
- Total attendance: 674,370
- Average attendance: 4,323( 370) (10 November 2024)
- All statistics correct as of 10 November 2024.

The 2024 Kazakhstan Premier League was the 33rd season of the Kazakhstan Premier League, the highest football league competition in Kazakhstan.

== Teams ==
The league consisted of thirteen teams; ten teams remaining from the previous season, and three teams promoted from the 2023 Kazakhstan First Division.

The three promoted teams were First Division champions Elimai (promoted after a nine season absence), runners-up Turan (promoted after a single season absence), and third-placed Zhenis (promoted for the first time in history if counting the new club founded in 2009 or promoted after a 15 season absence if counting the club who went bankrupt in 2009). They replaced the 2023 Kazakhstan Premier League bottom three teams; Okzhetpes (relegated after one season in the top flight), Caspiy (relegated after four seasons in top flight), and Aksu (relegated after two seasons in the top flight). Maktaaral were also relegated (after two seasons in the top flight) after being refused a Premier League license, reducing the number of teams to thirteen.

=== Team overview ===
Locations of teams in the 2024 Kazakhstan Premier League

Team	Location	Venue	Capacity
Aktobe	Aktobe	Central Stadium	12,729
Astana	Astana	Astana Arena^{1}	30,200
Atyrau	Atyrau	Munaishy Stadium	8,900
Elimai	Semey	Spartak Stadium	8,000
Kairat	Almaty	Central Stadium	23,804
Kaisar	Kyzylorda	Gani Muratbayev Stadium	7,000
Kyzylzhar	Petropavl	Karasai Stadium	11,000
Ordabasy	Shymkent	Kazhymukan Munaitpasov Stadium	20,000
Shakhter	Karaganda	Shakhter Stadium	19,500
Tobol	Kostanay	Central Stadium	10,500
Turan	Turkistan	Turkistan Arena	7,000
Zhenis	Astana	Kazhymukan Munaitpasov Stadium	12,250
Zhetysu	Taldykorgan	Samat Suyumbayev Stadium	5,550

^{1} Astana will play their home matches at the Khan Taniri Stadium in Almaty due to renovation work to the Astana Arena.

=== Personnel and kits ===
Note: Flags indicate national team as has been defined under FIFA eligibility rules. Players and Managers may hold more than one non-FIFA nationality.

Team	Manager	Captain	Kit manufacturer	Shirt sponsor
Aktobe	(Ukraine) Ihor Leonov	(Argentina) Leonel Strumia	Adidas	Olimpbet
Astana	(Kazakhstan) Grigori Babayan	(Kazakhstan) Abzal Beisebekov	Adidas	Samruk Kazyna, Olimpbet, Chery, SportQory
Atyrau	(Belarus) Vitaly Zhukovsky	(Belarus) Igor Stasevich	Macron	GAZ Stroy Montazh KZ, Olimpbet
Elimai	(Kazakhstan) Andrei Karpovich	(Kazakhstan) Yerkebulan Nurgaliyev	Puma	
Kairat	(Kazakhstan) Rafael Urazbakhtin	(Kazakhstan) Danil Ustimenko	Joma	1XBET
Kaisar	(Russia) Viktor Kumykov	(Kazakhstan) Ruslan Sakhalbaev	Joma	
Kyzylzhar	(Kazakhstan) Ali Aliyev	(Belarus) Yevgeny Beryozkin	Nike	Olimpbet
Ordabasy	(Kazakhstan) Kirill Keker	(Kazakhstan) Askhat Tagybergen	Nike	Olimpbet
Shakhter	(Russia) Konstantin Yemelyanov (Acting Head Coach)	(Colombia) Roger Cañas	Kelme	Olimpbet
Tobol	(Kazakhstan) Nurbol Zhumaskaliyev	(Kazakhstan) Roman Asrankulov	Macron	Polymetal, Olimpbet
Turan	(Kazakhstan) Rinat Alyuetov	(Serbia) Nikola Cuckić	Nike	
Zhenis	(Greece) Akis Vavalis	(Kazakhstan) Temirlan Anarbekov	Diadora	
Zhetysu	(Kazakhstan) Kayrat Nurdauletov	(Kazakhstan) Serikzhan Muzhikov	Nike	Kainar

=== Foreign players ===
The number of foreign players is restricted to thirteen per KPL team squad of 25 players.

Foreign players in the KPL as of 12 August 2024.

For transfers during the season, see Winter 2023–24 transfers and Summer 2024 transfers.

Club	Player 1	Player 2	Player 3	Player 4	Player 5	Player 6	Player 7	Player 8	Player 9	Player 10	Player 11	Player 12	Player 13	Former players
Aktobe	(Argentina national football team) Leonel Strumia	(Belarus national football team) **Dmitry Bessmertny**	(Cameroon national football team) Gaby Kiki	(Croatia national football team) **Mateo Barać**	(Dominican Republic national football team) **Dorny Romero**	(Ecuador national football team) **José Cevallos**	(Guinea national football team) Amadou Doumbouya	(Haiti national football team) **Jayro Jean**	(Nigeria national football team) **Uche Agbo**	(Panama national football team) **Freddy Góndola**	(Romania national football team) **Bogdan Vătăjelu**	(Russia national football team) Idris Umayev		
Astana	(Albania national football team) Nazmi Gripshi	(Belarus national football team) **Max Ebong**	(Croatia national football team) **Karlo Bartolec**	(Croatia national football team) Josip Čondrić	(Croatia national football team) Branimir Kalaica	(Croatia national football team) **Marin Tomasov**	(Ghana national football team) Barnes Osei	(Guinea national football team) Ousmane Camara	(Lithuania national football team) **Kipras Kažukolovas**	(Nigeria national football team) Nnamdi Ahanonu	(Nigeria national football team) Geoffrey Chinedu	(North Macedonia national football team) Aleksa Amanović		(France national football team) Fabien Ourega (Greece national football team) Giannis Masouras (Spain national football team) Carlitos (Serbia national football team) Dušan Jovančić
Atyrau	(Belarus national football team) **Yegor Khatkevich**	(Belarus national football team) **Nikolay Signevich**	(Belarus national football team) **Igor Stasevich**	(Belarus national football team) **Nikita Stepanov**	(Brazil national football team) Mateus Barbosa	(DR Congo national football team) **Joel Kayamba**	(Russia national football team) Soslan Takulov	(Slovenia national football team) Jakob Novak	(Tajikistan national football team) **Fatkhullo Olimzoda**	(Tajikistan national football team) **Khusrav Toirov**	(Ukraine national football team) Oleksandr Noyok			(Gambia national football team) Lamine Jarjou (Portugal national football team) Pedro Eugénio
Elimai	(Belarus national football team) **Nikita Korzun**	(Bosnia and Herzegovina national football team) Ivan Šaravanja	(Brazil national football team) China	(Brazil national football team) Maicom David	(Dominican Republic national football team) **Edarlyn Reyes**	(France national football team) Quentin Cornette	(Russia national football team) Denis Kavlinov	(Russia national football team) Islam Mashukov	(Russia national football team) Daniil Penchikov	(Russia national football team) Dmitri Yashin	(Ukraine national football team) Maksym Koval			(Belarus national football team) **Nikolay Zolotov** (Cameroon national football team) **Robert Tambe** (Russia national football team) Miroslav Lobantsev (Russia national football team) **Yegor Sorokin** (Senegal national football team) **Sada Thioub**
Kairat	(Belarus national football team) **Valery Gromyko**	(Brazil national football team) João Paulo	(Brazil national football team) Élder Santana	(Georgia national football team) Luka Gadrani	(Georgia national football team) **Giorgi Zaria**	(Israel national football team) **Ofri Arad**	(Russia national football team) Dmitry Sergeyev	(Russia national football team) **Yegor Sorokin**	(Russia national football team) Vadim Ulyanov	(Serbia national football team) Jug Stanojev	(Uzbekistan national football team) **Ibrokhimkhalil Yuldoshev**			(Russia national football team) **Viktor Vasin**
Kaisar	(Armenia national football team) **Aram Ayrapetyan**	(Belarus national football team) Dzmitry Baradzin	(Belarus national football team) Vasily Sovpel	(Belarus national football team) **Ruslan Yudenkov**	(Cameroon national football team) Junior Kameni	(Moldova national football team) Ştefan Sicaci	(Montenegro national football team) Goran Milojko	(Montenegro national football team) Jovan Pajovic	(Ukraine national football team) Vitaliy Pryndeta	(Uzbekistan national football team) Shokhnazar Norbekov				(Belarus national football team) **Valery Gromyko**
Kyzylzhar	(Belarus national football team) **Yevgeny Beryozkin**	(Belarus national football team) Konstantin Rudenok	(Brazil national football team) Rafael Sabino	(Croatia national football team) **Zoran Nižić**	(Georgia national football team) Luka Imnadze	(Ivory Coast national football team) Senin Sebai	(Latvia national football team) **Vladislavs Sorokins**	(North Macedonia national football team) Nikola Bogdanovski	(Portugal national football team) Rúben Brígido	(Serbia national football team) Dušan Jovančić	(Ukraine national football team) Oleksiy Shchebetun			(Belgium national football team) Bryan Van Den Bogaert (Georgia national football team) Irakli Bugridze (Montenegro national football team) Boris Cmiljanić
Ordabasy	(Belarus national football team) Vsevolod Sadovsky	(Brazil national football team) Reginaldo	(Colombia national football team) Cristian Tovar	(Croatia national football team) Lovro Cvek	(Serbia national football team) Zlatan Šehović	(Ukraine national football team) **Artem Byesyedin**	(Ukraine national football team) **Yevheniy Makarenko**	(Ukraine national football team) **Ihor Plastun**	(Uzbekistan national football team) **Jasurbek Yakhshiboev**	(Uzbekistan national football team) **Shokhboz Umarov**				(Croatia national football team) Karlo Sentić (Gambia national football team) **Dembo Darboe**
Shakhter	(Belarus national football team) Dmitry Lisakovich	(Bosnia and Herzegovina national football team) Jovan Ilic	(Colombia national football team) Francisco Campo	(Colombia national football team) Roger Cañas	(Georgia national football team) Imeda Ashortia	(Russia national football team) Layonel Adams	(Russia national football team) Yevgeni Kozlov	(Serbia national football team) Milan Đokić	(Serbia national football team) Miloš Nikolić	(Serbia national football team) Filip Stamenković	(Ukraine national football team) Dmytro Ryzhuk	(Ukraine national football team) Maksym Drachenko		(Cameroon national football team) Arthur Bougnone (Colombia national football team) Juan Asprilla (Georgia national football team) Anton Tolordava (Moldova national football team) Igor Mostovei (Montenegro national football team) Mitar Ćuković
Tobol	(Bulgaria national football team) **Radoslav Tsonev**	(France national football team) Pape-Alioune Ndiaye	(Georgia national football team) Tsotne Mosiashvili	(Morocco national football team) **Ahmed El Messaoudi**	(Nigeria national football team) Ededem Essien	(Portugal national football team) Rui Costa	(Portugal national football team) Pedro Eugénio	(Russia national football team) Albert Gabarayev	(Serbia national football team) Igor Ivanović	(Serbia national football team) Ivan Miladinović	(Togo national football team) **David Henen**	(Ukraine national football team) **Yevhen Shakhov**		(Italy national football team) Godberg Cooper (Kosovo national football team) **David Domgjoni**
Turan	(Albania national football team) Plarent Fejzaj	(Belarus national football team) Vladislav Vasilyuchek	(Bolivia national football team) **Leonardo Vaca**	(Croatia national football team) Antonio Jakoliš	(Estonia national football team) **Artjom Dmitrijev**	(Ghana national football team) David Mawutor	(North Macedonia national football team) Viktor Velkoski	(Russia national football team) Artyom Arkhipov	(Russia national football team) Pavel Kireyenko	(Serbia national football team) Marko Nikolić	(Serbia national football team) Nikola Cuckić			(Slovakia national football team) Branislav Sluka (Tunisia national football team) Fedi Ben Choug
Zhenis	(Belarus national football team) **Denis Grechikho**	(Belarus national football team) **Syarhey Volkaw**	(Brazil national football team) Adílio	(Croatia national football team) Marin Belancić	(Czech Republic national football team) **Lukáš Budínský**	(Georgia national football team) Giorgi Pantsulaia	(Georgia national football team) Zurab Tevzadze	(Poland national football team) Krystian Nowak	(Portugal national football team) João Oliveira	(Portugal national football team) Bruno Silva	(Slovenia national football team) Matija Rom			(Egypt national football team) **Alexander Jakobsen** (Georgia national football team) Irakli Bidzinashvili (Greece national football team) Vasilios Karagounis (Kosovo national football team) **Arb Manaj** (Serbia national football team) Iljasa Zulfiu (Sweden men's national football team) Benjamin Hjertstrand
Zhetysu	(Albania national football team) Shqiprim Taipi	(Belarus national football team) Konstantin Kuchinsky	(Belarus national football team) Anton Shramchenko	(Brazil national football team) Victor Braga	(Brazil national football team) Elivelton	(Georgia national football team) Gia Chaduneli	(Germany national football team) Meik Karwot	(Russia national football team) Ruslan Bolov	(Russia national football team) Arsen Siukayev	(Ukraine national football team) Orest Kostyk				(Georgia national football team) Tsotne Mosiashvili (Russia national football team) Maksim Chikanchi

In bold: Players that have been capped for their national team.

=== Managerial changes ===
Team	Outgoing manager	Manner of departure	Date of vacancy	Position in table	Incoming manager	Date of appointment
Shakhter Karagandy	Igor Soloshenko	Resigned	2 April 2024	13th	Andrei Finonchenko	2 April 2024
Kairat	Kirill Keker	Resigned	29 April 2024	8th	Rafael Urazbakhtin (Caretaker)	29 May 2024
Zhenis	Levan Korgalidze	Mutual agreement	21 May 2024	13th	Akis Vavalis	22 May 2024
Kairat	Rafael Urazbakhtin (Caretaker)	End of caretaker role	29 May 2024	3rd	Aleksandr Kerzhakov	29 May 2024
Tobol	Milić Ćurčić	Mutual agreement	10 June 2024	7th	Nurbol Zhumaskaliyev (Caretaker)	10 June 2024
Tobol	Nurbol Zhumaskaliyev (Caretaker)	End of role	3 July 2024	4th	Nurbol Zhumaskaliyev	3 July 2024
Ordabasy	Aleksandr Sednyov	Resigned	18 August 2024	3rd	Aleksandr Kuchma (Acting)	22 August 2024
Ordabasy	Aleksandr Kuchma (Acting)	End of role	26 August 2024	3rd	Kirill Keker	26 August 2024
Aktobe	Dmytro Parfenov	Mutual agreement	31 August 2024	2nd	Ihor Leonov	6 September 2024
Kairat	Aleksandr Kerzhakov	Mutual agreement	3 September 2024	1st	Rafael Urazbakhtin	6 September 2024
Shakhter Karagandy	Andrei Finonchenko	Resigned	9 September 2024	13th	Konstantin Yemelyanov	9 September 2024

== Regular season ==
=== League table ===
Pos	Team	Pld	W	D	L	GF	GA	GD	Pts	Qualification or relegation
1	Kairat (C)	24	14	5	5	39	21	+18	47	Qualification for the Champions League first qualifying round
2	Astana	24	14	4	6	39	19	+20	46	Qualification for the Conference League second qualifying round
3	Aktobe (W)	24	12	7	5	39	26	+13	43	Qualification for the Europa League first qualifying round (Note: Aktobe qualified for the Europa League first qualifying round by winning the 2024 Kazakhstan Cup.)
4	Ordabasy	24	12	6	6	36	24	+12	42	Qualification for the Conference League first qualifying round
5	Tobol	24	11	6	7	33	23	+10	39	
6	Elimai	24	10	7	7	35	32	+3	37	
7	Atyrau	24	9	8	7	28	20	+8	35	
8	Kaisar	24	9	7	8	28	29	−1	34	
9	Kyzylzhar	24	8	5	11	29	26	+3	29	
10	Zhenis	24	6	6	12	18	32	−14	24	
11	Zhetysu	24	5	8	11	17	33	−16	23	
12	Turan	24	5	5	14	16	39	−23	20	
13	Shakhter (R)	24	2	4	18	12	45	−33	10	Relegation to Kazakhstan First Division

Source: UEFA, Soccerway, QFL
Rules for classification: 1) Points; 2) Goal difference; 3) Matches won; 4) Goals scored; 5) Away goals scored; 6) Head-to-head points; 7) Head-to-head matches won; 8) Head-to-head goal difference; 9) Head-to-head goals scored; 10) Head-to-head away goals scored; 11) Draw.
(C) Champions; (R) Relegated; (W) Cup winners

=== Results ===
==== Results table ====
Home \ Away	AKT	AST	ATY	ELI	KRT	KSR	KYZ	ORD	SHA	TOB	TUR	ZNS	ZTS
Aktobe		1–1	1–1	1–3	2–1	1–1	2–0	0–0	1–0	3–4	2–0	3–0	3–0
Astana	2–0		3–2	0–1	1–3	1–1	2–1	0–1	3–0	2–2	2–1	2–0	5–0
Atyrau	1–1	1–0		1–0	0–1	2–2	2–0	1–1	1–0	0–0	3–0	2–1	0–1
Elimai	2–2	0–3	0–0		1–1	1–0	2–1	1–1	2–1	2–1	6–0	1–0	1–1
Kairat	1–3	0–1	1–0	4–1		1–0	2–1	2–1	4–2	2–2	5–1	1–1	0–0
Kaisar	1–3	0–1	1–1	2–1	1–0		0–3	2–1	5–1	2–0	1–1	1–0	0–0
Kyzylzhar	0–2	0–1	3–2	1–1	0–1	6–2		0–1	2–0	0–0	0–1	4–0	2–1
Ordabasy	1–1	2–4	1–0	2–1	1–2	2–1	1–1		5–0	1–0	2–0	1–2	3–1
Shakhter	1–3	1–0	0–3	1–2	0–3	0–0	1–1	2–3		1–0	0–2	0–0	0–0
Tobol	3–0	1–0	1–1	4–2	1–0	1–2	1–2	1–0	1–0		2–0	1–1	1–0
Turan	0–1	0–2	2–1	2–2	0–0	0–1	1–0	0–1	2–1	0–2		1–1	2–3
Zhenis	1–2	1–1	0–1	1–2	0–2	1–0	0–1	1–3	1–0	2–1	1–0		1–0
Zhetysu	2–1	0–2	0–2	2–0	1–2	1–2	0–0	1–1	1–0	0–3	0–0	2–2	

Source: Soccerway
Legend: Blue = home team win; Yellow = draw; Red = away team win.

==== Results by match played ====
Team ╲ Round	1	2	3	4	5	6	7	8	9	10	11	12	13	14	15	16	17	18	19	20	21	22	23	24	25	26
Aktobe	W	P	W	D	W	L	D	W	D	W	D	W	L	D	W	W	D	D	L	W	L	W	P	L	W	W
Astana	W	W	L	L	D	W	D	D	L	P	L	W	L	P	W	W	W	D	W	W	W	W	W	W	L	W
Atyrau	D	D	L	D	D	W	L	P	W	W	W	D	L	D	P	D	L	W	D	L	W	W	L	W	W	L
Elimai	D	L	W	W	P	D	W	W	D	D	D	D	D	L	W	L	W	W	W	W	W	L	L	L	P	L
Kairat	W	D	W	D	L	L	W	W	D	W	L	P	W	D	W	W	W	D	L	P	W	L	W	W	W	W
Kaisar	L	L	P	L	D	W	D	D	W	W	D	W	L	W	L	D	D	D	W	L	L	P	W	W	L	W
Kyzylzhar	L	W	D	W	D	L	L	L	D	D	P	L	W	W	L	W	L	L	P	L	L	L	W	D	W	W
Ordabasy	W	D	L	W	D	D	P	W	D	W	W	W	W	W	D	P	W	D	L	W	L	W	L	L	L	W
Shakhter	L	L	L	W	L	P	D	L	W	L	L	L	L	D	L	L	L	L	D	L	L	L	L	D	L	P
Tobol	W	W	D	P	D	D	W	L	L	L	W	D	W	L	W	W	W	D	D	L	W	L	W	P	W	L
Turan	L	D	W	L	L	L	W	L	P	L	D	D	W	L	L	L	L	P	D	W	W	L	L	L	D	L
Zhenis	L	W	L	L	W	D	L	L	L	L	D	L	P	D	L	L	P	D	D	W	L	W	W	W	D	L
Zhetysu	P	L	W	D	W	W	L	W	D	L	D	L	D	D	D	L	L	D	D	L	P	W	L	L	L	L

W = Win; D = Draw; L = Loss; P = Postponed

==== Positions by round ====
Team ╲ Round	1	2	3	4	5	6	7	8	9	10	11	12	13	14	15	16	17	18	19	20	21	22	23	24	25	26
Aktobe	2	6	3	4	1	1	2	1	1	1	1	2	2	2	2	1	2	2	2	1	4	2	4	4	3	3
Astana	4	2	4	7	6	2	3	7	7	7	8	8	9	9	9	8	9	10	8	5	6	5	3	1	2	2
Atyrau	6	8	11	10	10	9	9	9	8	6	5	5	6	7	8	7	7	6	7	6	7	7	7	7	7	7
Elimai	7	9	8	6	7	7	4	3	2	4	4	4	5	5	4	4	4	4	3	2	1	3	5	5	6	6
Kairat	5	4	2	1	5	8	5	3	3	2	3	3	3	3	3	2	1	1	1	4	3	4	2	2	1	1
Kaisar	10	12	12	13	13	12	12	12	10	9	7	7	8	6	6	5	6	7	5	7	8	8	8	8	8	8
Kyzylzhar	9	5	6	2	2	6	8	8	9	10	10	10	10	10	10	10	8	8	10	10	10	10	10	9	9	9
Ordabasy	1	3	5	3	3	4	7	5	5	3	2	1	1	1	1	3	3	3	4	3	2	1	1	3	5	4
Shakhter	13	13	13	11	12	13	13	13	12	12	13	13	13	13	13	13	13	13	13	13	13	13	13	13	13	13
Tobol	3	1	1	5	4	9	1	6	6	8	9	6	4	4	5	6	5	5	6	8	5	6	6	6	4	5
Turan	12	10	7	8	11	11	10	10	11	11	11	11	11	11	11	11	11	11	11	11	11	11	12	12	12	12
Zhenis	11	7	10	12	9	10	11	11	13	13	12	12	12	12	12	12	12	12	12	12	12	12	11	11	10	10
Zhetysu	8	11	9	9	8	3	6	4	4	5	6	9	7	8	7	9	10	9	9	9	9	9	9	10	11	11

Leader and Champions League first qualifying round
Conference League second qualifying round
Europa League first qualifying round
Conference League first qualifying round
Relegation to 2025 Kazakhstan First Division

== Season statistics ==
=== Top scorers ===
As of match played 10 November 2024

Rank	Player	Club	Goals
1	(Kazakhstan) Islam Chesnokov	Tobol	10
1	(Brazil) João Paulo	Kairat	10
1	(Belarus) Nikolay Signevich	Atyrau	10
4	(Uzbekistan) Jasurbek Yakhshiboev	Ordabasy	9
5	(Belarus) Nikita Korzun	Elimai	7
5	(Nigeria) Geoffrey Chinedu	Astana	7
5	(Belarus) Yevgeny Beryozkin	Kyzylzhar	7
5	(Kazakhstan) Aybar Zhaksylykov	Kaisar	7
9	(Belarus) Valeriy Gromyko	Kaisar/Kairat	6
9	(Russia) Idris Umayev	Aktobe	6
9	(Georgia (country)) Giorgi Zaria	Kairat	6
9	(Albania) Nazmi Gripshi	Astana	6
9	(Croatia) Marin Tomasov	Astana	6

=== Hat-tricks ===
Player	For	Against	Result	Date	Ref.
(Brazil national football team) João Paulo	Kairat	Turan	5–1 (H)	19 October 2024	
(Kazakhstan national football team) Aybar Zhaksylykov	Kaisar	Shakhter Karagandy	5–1 (H)	20 October 2024	
(Ivory Coast national football team) Senin Sebai	Kyzylzhar	Kaisar	6–2 (H)	2 November 2024	

=== Clean sheets ===
As of match played 10 November 2024

Rank	Player	Club	Clean sheets
1	(Kazakhstan) Stas Pokatilov	Tobol	11
2	(Belarus) Yegor Khatkevich	Atyrau	10
3	(Russia) Arsen Siukayev	Zhetysu	8
3	(Kazakhstan) Igor Shatsky	Aktobe	8
5	(Croatia) Josip Čondrić	Astana	7
6	(Moldova) Ștefan Sicaci	Kaisar	6
6	(Russia) Vadim Ulyanov	Kairat	6
8	(Russia) Denis Kavlinov	Elimai	5
9	(Kazakhstan) Dzhurakhon Babakhanov	Kyzylzhar	4
9	(Kazakhstan) Bekkhan Shayzada	Ordabasy	4

== Attendances ==
#	Club	Average
1	Aktobe	10,442
2	Kairat	10,134
3	Ordabasy	7,881
4	Elimai	6,167
5	Atyrau	3,933
6	Tobol	3,281
7	Shakhter	3,042
8	Kaysar	2,788
9	Zhetysu	2,333
10	Qyzyljar	2,233
11	Tūran	2,015
12	Astana	1,671
13	Zhenis	254
