= 2024 FC Shakhter Karagandy season =

FC Shakhter Karagandy
2024 season
- Chairman: Erlan Urazaev
- Manager: Igor Soloshenko (until 4 April); Andrei Finonchenko (4 April-9 September); Konstantin Yemelyanov (Acting Head Coach) (9 September-5 November); Jiří Jarošík (from 5 November)
- Stadium: Shakhter Stadium
- Premier League: 13th (Relegated)
- Kazakhstan Cup: Round of 16 vs Elimai
- League Cup: Group Stage
- Top goalscorer: League: Imeda Ashortia (4); All: Imeda Ashortia (4); Roger Cañas (4)
- Highest home attendance: 7,000 vs Kairat (27 July 2024); 7,000 vs Ordabasy (18 August 2024)
- Lowest home attendance: 1,000 vs Turan (30 March 2024); 1,000 vs Kyzylzhar (27 October 2024)
- Average home league attendance: 3,227 (3 November 2024)

The 2024 FC Shakhter Karagandy season was the 34th successive season that Shakhter Karagandy played in the Kazakhstan Premier League, the highest tier of association football in Kazakhstan. Shakhter ended the season bottom of the Premier League, and were relegated from the Kazakh top flight for the first time in their history. Shakhter were also eliminated from the Kazakhstan Cup at the Round of 16 stage by Elimai, and finished bottom of their League Cup group.

== Season events ==
On 24 February, Shakhter Karagandy announced the signing of Filip Stamenković from Metallurg Bekabad, with Imeda Ashortia signing from Telavi on the next day and Dmitry Bachek joining from Arsenal Dzerzhinsk on 26 February.

On 27 February, Shakhter Karagandy announced the signing of Igor Mostovei from Zimbru Chișinău and Dmytro Ryzhuk from Okzhetpes.

On 29 February, Shakhter Karagandy announced the signing of Juan Asprilla, who'd last played for Boyacá Chicó.

On 29 March, Shakhter Karagandy announced the signing of Arthur Bougnone from Fayzkand.

On 2 April, Head Coach Igor Soloshenko resigned from his position, with Andrei Finonchenko being placed as the clubs Acting Head Coach.

On 12 April, Shakhter Karagandy announced the signing of Mitar Ćuković from Kyzylzhar.

On 26 June, Shakhter Karagandy announced the signing of Eskendir Kybyray from Zhetysu.

On 28 June, Shakhter Karagandy announced the signing of Milan Đokić from Dubočica, and the signing of free-agent Maksym Drachenko.

On 4 July, Shakhter Karagandy announced the signings of Andrey Shabanov and Dmitry Lisakovich.

On 6 July, Shakhter Karagandy announced the signing of Yevgeni Kozlov from Mohammedan.

On 12 July, Shakhter Karagandy announced the signing of Miloš Nikolić from Sloga Meridian.

On 12 August, Shakhter Karagandy announced the loan signing of Francisco Campo from Dynamo Makhachkala until the end of the season.

On 9 September, Shakhter Karagandy announced that Andrei Finonchenko had resigned from his role as Head Coach, with Konstantin Yemelyanov being appointed as Acting Head Coach.

On 5 November, Shakhter Karagandy announced that Jiří Jarošík being appointed as new Head Coach.

== Squad ==
As of match played 3 November 2024

No.	Name	Nationality	Position	Date of birth (age)	Signed from	Signed in	Contract ends	Apps.	Goals
Goalkeepers
1	Andrey Shabanov	(Kazakhstan)	GK	17 November 1986 (aged 37)	Unattached	2024		4	0
40	Yegor Tsuprikov	(Kazakhstan)	GK	27 May 1997 (aged 27)	Tobol	2022		39	0
95	Danila Karpikov	(Kazakhstan)	GK	15 October 2003 (aged 21)	Altai	2022		1	0
Defenders
2	Egor Alishauskas	(Kazakhstan)	DF	18 December 1997 (aged 26)	Unattached	2023		44	1
4	Dmytro Ryzhuk	(Ukraine)	DF	5 April 1992 (aged 32)	Okzhetpes	2024		26	0
5	Filip Stamenković	(Serbia)	DF	15 September 1998 (aged 26)	Metallurg Bekabad	2024		24	0
6	Miloš Nikolić	(Serbia)	DF	3 October 1994 (aged 30)	Sloga Meridian	2024		5	0
15	Bogdan Savkiv	(Kazakhstan)	DF	28 August 2001 (aged 23)	Academy	2023		47	0
16	Eskendir Kybyray	(Kazakhstan)	DF	14 August 1997 (aged 27)	Zhetysu	2024			
18	Ansar Altynkhan	(Kazakhstan)	DF	8 November 2003 (aged 20)	Academy	2022		11	1
27	Shakhsultan Zubaydilda	(Kazakhstan)	DF	22 June 2001 (aged 23)	Academy	2024		4	0
33	Layonel Adams	(Russia)	DF	9 August 1994 (aged 30)	Zhetysu	2024		6	0
44	Almas Tyulyubay	(Kazakhstan)	DF	18 April 2001 (aged 23)	Academy	2022		32	0
60	Francisco Campo	(Colombia)	DF	23 August 2000 (aged 24)	Dynamo Makhachkala	2024	2024	8	0
68	Alexandr Migunov	(Kazakhstan)	DF	7 March 2005 (aged 19)	Kairat	2024		11	0
Midfielders
7	Maksym Drachenko	(Ukraine)	MF	28 January 1990 (aged 34)	Unattached	2024		8	0
8	Abylaykhan Nazymkhanov	(Kazakhstan)	MF	5 February 2002 (aged 22)	Academy	2021		92	3
17	Dmitry Lisakovich	(Belarus)	MF	10 October 1999 (aged 25)	Torpedo-BelAZ Zhodino	2024		13	1
19	Yevgeni Kozlov	(Russia)	MF	4 February 1995 (aged 29)	Mohammedan	2024		14	2
20	Dmitry Bachek	(Kazakhstan)	MF	13 December 2000 (aged 23)	Arsenal Dzerzhinsk	2024		15	1
21	Jovan Ilic	(Bosnia and Herzegovina)	MF	30 January 2000 (aged 24)	Novi Sad	2024		12	0
23	Ruslan Tutkyshev	(Kazakhstan)	MF	18 February 1999 (aged 25)	Academy	2023		33	1
88	Roger Cañas	(Colombia)	MF	27 March 1990 (aged 34)	Barnechea	2022		158	20
Forwards
9	Aydos Tattybayev	(Kazakhstan)	FW	26 April 1990 (aged 34)	Caspiy	2020		187	39
10	Imeda Ashortia	(Georgia (country))	FW	30 October 1996 (aged 28)	Telavi	2024		28	4
11	Aybar Abdulla	(Kazakhstan)	FW	22 January 2002 (aged 22)	Kairat	2023		36	2
29	Daniyal Takhanov	(Kazakhstan)	FW	22 June 2001 (aged 23)	Academy	2024		7	0
97	Milan Đokić	(Serbia)	FW	12 September 1997 (aged 27)	Dubočica	2024		12	2
Players away on loan
Players that left during the season
1	Igor Mostovei	(Moldova)	GK	25 September 1999 (aged 25)	Zimbru Chișinău	2024		3	0
3	Anton Tolordava	(Georgia (country))	DF	2 August 1996 (aged 28)	Radnički Niš	2023		36	0
6	Mitar Ćuković	(Montenegro)	DF	6 April 1995 (aged 29)	Kyzylzhar	2024		8	0
17	Shyngys Flyuk	(Kazakhstan)	FW	28 December 2001 (aged 22)	Academy	2022		25	2
21	Maksim Galkin	(Kazakhstan)	FW	12 July 1999 (aged 25)	Academy	2018		40	1
22	Georgi Zakharenko	(Kazakhstan)	MF	12 January 1998 (aged 26)	Aksu	2023		13	0
30	Arthur Bougnone	(Cameroon)	MF	20 November 2000 (aged 23)	Fayzkand	2024		10	0
80	Juan Asprilla	(Colombia)	FW	30 August 1999 (aged 25)	Unattached	2024		12	0

== Transfers ==
=== In ===
Date	Position	Nationality	Name	From	Fee	Ref.
24 February 2024	DF	(Serbia)	Filip Stamenković	Metallurg Bekabad	Undisclosed	
25 February 2024	FW	(Georgia (country))	Imeda Ashortia	Telavi	Undisclosed	
26 February 2024	MF	(Kazakhstan)	Dmitry Bachek	Arsenal Dzerzhinsk	Undisclosed	
27 February 2024	GK	(Moldova)	Igor Mostovei	Zimbru Chișinău	Undisclosed	
27 February 2024	DF	(Ukraine)	Dmytro Ryzhuk	Okzhetpes	Undisclosed	
29 February 2024	FW	(Colombia)	Juan Asprilla	Unattached	Free	
29 March 2024	MF	(Cameroon)	Arthur Bougnone	Fayzkand	Undisclosed	
5 April 2024	DF	(Russia)	Layonel Adams	Zhetysu	Undisclosed	
12 April 2024	DF	(Montenegro)	Mitar Ćuković	Kyzylzhar	Undisclosed	
26 June 2024	DF	(Kazakhstan)	Eskendir Kybyray	Zhetysu	Undisclosed	
28 June 2024	MF	(Ukraine)	Maksym Drachenko	Unattached	Free	
28 June 2024	FW	(Serbia)	Milan Đokić	Dubočica	Undisclosed	
4 July 2024	GK	(Kazakhstan)	Andrey Shabanov	Unattached	Free	
4 July 2024	MF	(Belarus)	Dmitry Lisakovich	Torpedo-BelAZ Zhodino	Undisclosed	
5 July 2024	MF	(Russia)	Yevgeni Kozlov	Mohammedan	Undisclosed	
12 July 2024	DF	(Serbia)	Miloš Nikolić	Sloga Meridian	Undisclosed	

=== Loans in ===
Date from	Position	Nationality	Name	From	Date to	Ref.
12 August 2024	DF	(Colombia)	Francisco Campo	Dynamo Makhachkala	End of the season	

=== Out ===
Date	Position	Nationality	Name	To	Fee	Ref.
30 June 2024	MF	(Kazakhstan)	Georgi Zakharenko	Ekibastuz	Undisclosed	
30 June 2024	FW	(Kazakhstan)	Shyngys Flyuk	Ulytau	Undisclosed	
30 June 2024	FW	(Kazakhstan)	Maksim Galkin	Ekibastuz	Undisclosed	
3 August 2024	MF	(Cameroon)	Arthur Bougnone	Slutsk	Undisclosed	
3 August 2024	FW	(Colombia)	Juan Asprilla	Aragvi Dusheti	Undisclosed	

=== Released ===
Date	Position	Nationality	Name	Joined	Date	Ref.
30 June 2024	GK	(Moldova)	Igor Mostovei	Milsami Orhei		
30 June 2024	DF	(Georgia (country))	Anton Tolordava	Telavi	16 July 2024	
30 June 2024	DF	(Montenegro)	Mitar Ćuković	Jezero		

== Friendlies ==
2024	v
(UTC+5)

== Competitions ==
=== Overview ===
Competition	First match	Last match	Starting round	Final position	Record							
Competition	First match	Last match	Starting round	Final position	Pld	W	D	L	GF	GA	GD	Win %
Premier League	2 March 2024	3 November 2024	Matchday 1	13th	24	2	4	18	12	45	−33	8.33
Kazakhstan Cup	14 April 2024	14 April 2024	Round of 16	Round of 16	1	0	0	1	1	2	−1	0.00
League Cup	26 May 2024	19 July 2024	Group stage	Group stage	3	1	0	2	4	6	−2	33.33
Total					28	3	4	21	17	53	−36	10.71

Last updated: 3 November 2024
Source: Competitions

=== Premier League ===
==== Results summary ====
Overall								Home						Away					
Pld	W	D	L	GF	GA	GD	Pts	W	D	L	GF	GA	GD	W	D	L	GF	GA	GD
23	2	4	17	11	40	−29	10	2	4	6	7	17	−10	0	0	11	4	23	−19

Last updated: 3 November 2024.
Source: See Results

==== Results by round ====
Round	1	2	3	4	5	6^{1}	7	8	9	10	11	12	13	14	15	17	18	19	20	21	16	22	23	24	25	26^{1}
Ground	A	A	H	H	A	H	H	A	H	A	H	A	A	H	H	H	A	H	A	H	A	A	A	H	H	A
Result	L	L	L	W	L	P	D	L	W	L	L	L	L	D	L	L	L	D	L	L	L	L	L	D	L	P
Position	13	13	13	11	12	13	13	13	12	12	13	13	13	13	13	13	13	13	13	13	13	13	13	13	13	13

Source: See Results
A = Away; H = Home; W = Win; D = Draw; L = Loss; P = Bye
Notes:
- ^{1} Shakhter Karagandy had a bye during the sixth and twenty-sixth round of fixtures.

==== Results ====
2 March 2024 1	Ordabasy	5–0	Shakhter Karagandy	Shymkent
16:30 (UTC+5)	Plastun 5'; Umarov 13'; Yakhshiboev 37'; Malyi (yellow card) 55' (goal) 67'; Šehović 60'	Report	Flyuk (yellow card) 34'; Tyulyubay (yellow card) 39'; Ashortia (yellow card) 75'	Stadium: Kazhymukan Munaitpasov Stadium; Attendance: 8,500; Referee: Ruslan Sultangaliev

7 March 2024 2	Zhenis	1–0	Shakhter Karagandy	Pavlodar
14:30 (UTC+5)	Manaj 45'; Bidzinashvili (yellow card) 80'; Kalmykov (yellow card) 90+5'	Report	Cañas (yellow card) 71'	Stadium: Central Stadium; Attendance: 250; Referee: Sergey Nozhenko

30 March 2024 3	Shakhter Karagandy	0–2	Turan	Karaganda
14:00 (UTC+5)	Abdulla (yellow card) 33'; Asprilla (yellow card) 37'; Tolordava (yellow card) 69'	Report	Vaca 7' (yellow card) 23'; Sluka (yellow card) 16' (goal) 39'; Zakirov (yellow card) 90+2'; Sokolenko (yellow card) 90+3'	Stadium: Shakhter Stadium; Attendance: 1,000; Referee: Georgy Chekhovsky

7 April 2024 4	Shakhter Karagandy	1–0	Astana	Karaganda
16:30 (UTC+5)	Cañas 26' (yellow card) 63'; Savkiv (yellow card) 37'; Alishauskas (yellow card) 40'; Tyulyubay (yellow card) 68'	Report	Astanov (yellow card) 54'; Tomasov (yellow card) 90+2'	Stadium: Shakhter Stadium; Attendance: 4,000; Referee: Baghdad Abdullayev

21 April 2024 5	Zhetysu	1–0	Shakhter Karagandy	Karaganda
19:00 (UTC+5)	Muzhikov 45+5' (pen.); Siukayev (yellow card) 66'	Report	Ryzhuk (yellow card) 28'	Stadium: Shakhter Stadium; Attendance: 2,000; Referee: Denis Tevyashov

6	Shakhter Karagandy	Bye	Aksu	Karaganda
(UTC+5)				Stadium: Shakhter Stadium

5 May 2024 7	Shakhter Karagandy	0–0	Kaisar	Karaganda
19:00 (UTC+5)	Nazymkhanov (yellow card) 25'; Alishauskas (yellow card) 37'; Bougnone (yellow card) 66'	Report	Altynbekov (yellow card) 30'; Gromyko (yellow card) 35'; Narzildayev (yellow card) 37'; Norbekov (yellow card) 90+1'	Stadium: Shakhter Stadium; Attendance: 1,500; Referee: Bagdat Abdullaev

12 May 2024 8	Elimai	2–1	Shakhter Karagandy	Semey
17:00 (UTC+5)	Murtazayev 38'; Korzun 90+7'	Report	Tolordava (yellow card) 9'; Tyulyubay (yellow card) 40'; Stamenković (yellow card) 74'; Nazymkhanov 88'; Tsuprikov (yellow card) 90+6'	Stadium: Spartak Stadium; Referee: Daniyar Sakhi

19 May 2024 9	Shakhter Karagandy	1–0	Tobol	Karaganda
17:00 (UTC+5)	Tolordava (yellow card) 32'; Cañas 37'	Report	Domgjoni (yellow card) 26'; Cooper (yellow card) 32'	Stadium: Shakhter Stadium; Attendance: 3,000; Referee: Grigory Moskovchenko

2 June 2024 10	Kairat	4–2	Shakhter Karagandy	Almaty
19:00 (UTC+5)	Sadybekov 22'; Yuldoshev 25' (yellow card) 71'; Seydakhmet (yellow card) 38'; Arad (yellow card) 72'; Zaria 77' (pen.); Santana 81'; Shvyryov (yellow card) 90+3'	Report	Ashortia 35', 65'; Tyulyubay (yellow card) 48'; Cañas (yellow card) 69'; Stamenković (yellow card) 78'	Stadium: Central Stadium; Attendance: 10,159; Referee: Alexander Zatula

15 June 2024 11	Shakhter Karagandy	0–3	Atyrau	Karaganda
17:00 (UTC+5)	Altynkhan (yellow card) 50'; Cañas (yellow card) 85'; Tattybayev (yellow card) 85'; Alishauskas (yellow card) 85'	Report	Eugénio 24'; Zhagorov 45+3'; Stasevich 81'; Kayamba (yellow card) 85'; Kerimzhanov (yellow card) 85'	Stadium: Shakhter Stadium; Attendance: 2,000; Referee: Aydin Tasybaev

23 June 2024 12	Aktobe	1–0	Shakhter Karagandy	Aktobe
20:00 (UTC+5)	Barać (yellow card) 53'; Romero 70'; Baytana (yellow card) 90+3'	Report	Stamenković (yellow card) 33'; Abdulla (yellow card) 42'; Tyulyubay (yellow card) 44'	Stadium: Central Stadium; Attendance: 12,400; Referee: Anton Kuchma

29 June 2024 13	Kyzylzhar	2–0	Shakhter Karagandy	Petropavl
18:00 (UTC+5)	Shchebetun (yellow card) 36' (goal) 56'; Khaseyn (yellow card) 51'; Brígido 78'; Imnadze 90+1'	Report	Kybyray (yellow card) 23'; Migunov (yellow card) 33'; Savkiv (yellow card) 48'; Cañas (yellow card) 85'	Stadium: Karasai Stadium; Attendance: 2,500; Referee: Ruslan Sultangaliev

13 July 2024 14	Shakhter Karagandy	0–0	Zhetysu	Karaganda
18:00 (UTC+5)	Zubaydilda (yellow card) 41'; Ilic (yellow card) 51'; Đokić (yellow card) 65'	Report	Muzhikov (yellow card) 56'	Stadium: Shakhter Stadium; Attendance: 2,500; Referee: Saken Bayymbet

27 July 2024 15	Shakhter Karagandy	0–3	Kairat	Karaganda
18:00 (UTC+5)	Tyulyubay (yellow card) 15'; Kybyray (yellow card) 48'	Report	Zaria 30' (yellow card) 36'; João Paulo 49'; Sorokin (yellow card) 83'; Shvyryov 90+7'	Stadium: Shakhter Stadium; Attendance: 7,000; Referee: Aydin Tasybaev

18 August 2024 17	Shakhter Karagandy	2–3	Ordabasy	Karaganda
18:00 (UTC+5)	Kozlov (yellow card) 1'; Nikolić (yellow card) 13'; Đokić 51'; Lisakovich 77'	Report	Malyi (red card) 15'; Tagybergen (yellow card) 19'; Yakhshiboev 35', 61' (yellow card) 45+2'; Byesyedin 58'	Stadium: Shakhter Stadium; Attendance: 7,000; Referee: Sayat Karabaev

24 August 2024 18	Atyrau	1–0	Shakhter Karagandy	Atyrau
18:00 (UTC+5)	Signevich 27'; Noyok (yellow card) 70'	Report	Ryzhuk (yellow card) 29'; Cañas (yellow card) 73'; Adams (red card) 85'; Tyulyubay (yellow card) 88'; Abdulla (yellow card) 90+1'	Stadium: Munaishy Stadium; Attendance: 3,000; Referee: Alexander Zatula

1 September 2024 19	Shakhter Karagandy	0–0	Zhenis	Karaganda
20:00 (UTC+5)	Drachenko (yellow card) 45+1'; Ilic (yellow card) 81'; Nazymkhanov (yellow card) 90+4'	Report	Nowak (yellow card) 27'; Belančić (yellow card) 45+1'	Stadium: Shakhter Stadium; Attendance: 1,500; Referee: Daniyar Sakhi

14 September 2024 20	Turan	2–1	Shakhter Karagandy	Turkistan
19:00 (UTC+5)	Khomukha 27' (yellow card) 29'; Usipkhanov (yellow card) 77'; Mishov 90+9'	Report	Nikolić (yellow card) 29'; Savkiv (yellow card) 50' (yellow-red card) 59'; Ashortia (yellow card) 55' (goal) 68' (pen.); Tsuprikov (yellow card) 88'	Stadium: Turkistan Arena; Attendance: 7,000; Referee: George Chekhovsky

22 September 2024 21	Shakhter Karagandy	1–2	Elimai	Karaganda
17:00 (UTC+5)	Cañas (yellow card) 90+2'; Kozlov 90+4'	Report	Korzun 15', 29'; Odeyobo (yellow card) 90+2'	Stadium: Shakhter Stadium; Attendance: 3,000; Referee: Rustam Omarov

28 September 2024 16	Tobol	1–0	Shakhter Karagandy	Kostanay
18:00 (UTC+5)	Chesnokov (penalty missed) 79'; Zuyev 88'; Tapalov (yellow card) 90+4'	Report	Ryzhuk (yellow card) 16'; Đokić (yellow card) 58'; Cañas (yellow card) 68'; Ilic (yellow card) 75'; Adams (yellow card) 90+2'	Stadium: Central Stadium; Attendance: 4,000; Referee: Sergey Nozhenko

16 October 2024 22	Astana	3–0	Shakhter Karagandy	Almaty
19:00 (UTC+5)	Tomasov 22'; Chinedu 23'; Gripshi 54'; Osei (yellow card) 70'	Report	Campo (yellow card) 20'	Stadium: Khan Taniri Stadium; Attendance: 200; Referee: Denis Izmailov

20 October 2024 23	Kaisar	5–1	Shakhter Karagandy	Kyzylorda
18:00 (UTC+5)	Zhaksylykov 27', 33', 47'; Milojko (yellow card) 45'; Yudenkov 54'; Kameni 73'; Narzildayev (yellow card) 90'	Report	Tyulyubay (yellow card) 65'; Altynkhan 85'	Stadium: Gani Muratbayev Stadium; Attendance: 2,000; Referee: Aydin Tasybaev

27 October 2024 24	Shakhter Karagandy	1–1	Kyzylzhar	Karaganda
14:00 (UTC+5)	Abdulla (yellow card) 25' (goal) 38'; Adams (red card) 25'	Report	Sebai 18' (yellow card) 75'	Stadium: Shakhter Stadium; Attendance: 1,000; Referee: Bulat Sariev

3 November 2024 25	Shakhter Karagandy	1–3	Aktobe	Karaganda
14:00 (UTC+5)	Abdulla (yellow card) 17'; Ashortia 52'; Zubaydilda (yellow card) 59'; Kozlov (yellow card) 90'; Kybyray (yellow card) 90+3'	Report	Kairov (yellow card) 17'; Doumbouya 22' (yellow card) 34'; Kenesov 55', 60' (yellow card) 69'; Tanzharikov (yellow card) 83'	Stadium: Shakhter Stadium; Attendance: 2,000; Referee: Elvira Nurmustafina

26	Aksu	Bye	Shakhter Karagandy	Pavlodar
(UTC+5)				Stadium: Central Stadium

==== League table ====
Pos	Team	Pld	W	D	L	GF	GA	GD	Pts	Qualification or relegation
9	Kyzylzhar	24	8	5	11	29	26	+3	29	
10	Zhenis	24	6	6	12	18	32	−14	24	
11	Zhetysu	24	5	8	11	17	33	−16	23	
12	Turan	24	5	5	14	16	39	−23	20	
13	Shakhter (R)	24	2	4	18	12	45	−33	10	Relegation to Kazakhstan First Division

Source: UEFA, Soccerway, QFL
Rules for classification: 1) Points; 2) Goal difference; 3) Matches won; 4) Goals scored; 5) Away goals scored; 6) Head-to-head points; 7) Head-to-head matches won; 8) Head-to-head goal difference; 9) Head-to-head goals scored; 10) Head-to-head away goals scored; 11) Draw.
(R) Relegated

=== Kazakhstan Cup ===
14 April 2024 Round of 16	Elimai	2–1	Shakhter Karagandy	Semey
16:00 (UTC+5)	China 50'; Sviridov 89'	Report	Stamenković (yellow card) 30'; Savkiv (yellow card) 56'; Bachek 73'; Alishauskas (yellow card) 86'	Stadium: Spartak Stadium; Attendance: 250; Referee: Daniyar Sakhi

=== League Cup ===
==== Group stage ====
Pos	Team	Pld	W	D	L	GF	GA	GD	Pts	Qualification
1	Astana	3	2	0	1	10	4	+6	6	Advanced to Semifinals
2	Caspiy	3	2	0	1	3	6	−3	6	
3	Zhetysu	3	1	0	2	4	5	−1	3	
4	Shakhter Karagandy	3	1	0	2	4	6	−2	3	

Updated to match(es) played on 20 July 2024. Source:

26 May 2024 1	Caspiy	1–0	Shakhter Karagandy	Zhanaozen
18:00 (UTC+5)	Zhumakhanov (yellow card) 43' (yellow-red card) 65'; Zhumabay (yellow card) 46'; Tolordava 88' (o.g.)	Report	Savkiv (yellow card) 18'; Bougnone (yellow card) 34'; Tyulyubay (yellow card) 58' (yellow-red card) 86'; Alishauskas (yellow card) 90+2'	Stadium: Amina Tuyakova Stadium; Attendance: 1,500; Referee: Sayat Sulikanov

7 July 2024 2	Shakhter Karagandy	2–1	Zhetysu	Karaganda
20:00 (UTC+5)	Đokić 4'; Cañas 38'; Stamenković (yellow card) 63'; Savkiv (yellow card) 67'	Report	Zhumabek 10'; Karaman (yellow card) 44'; Charleston (yellow card) 63'; Braga (yellow card) 90+6'	Stadium: Shakhter Stadium; Attendance: 1,500; Referee: Daniyar Sakhi

19 July 2024 3	Shakhter Karagandy	2–4	Astana	Karaganda
17:00 (UTC+5)	Kozlov 6'; Cañas 36' (yellow card) 52'; Ilic (yellow card) 73'	Report	Chinedu 13', 30' (pen.), 78'; Amanović (yellow card) 41'; Gripshi 48'; Tomasov (yellow card) 65'	Stadium: Shakhter Stadium; Attendance: 3,000; Referee: Alexander Zatula

== Squad statistics ==
As of match played 3 November 2024

=== Appearances and goals ===
No.	Pos	Nat	Player	Total		Premier League		Kazakhstan Cup		League Cup	
No.	Pos	Nat	Player	Apps	Goals	Apps	Goals	Apps	Goals	Apps	Goals
1	GK	(Kazakhstan) KAZ	Andrey Shabanov	4	0	3	0	0	0	1	0
2	DF	(Kazakhstan) KAZ	Egor Alishauskas	11	0	7+2	0	0+1	0	0+1	0
4	DF	(Ukraine) UKR	Dmytro Ryzhuk	26	0	23	0	1	0	2	0
5	DF	(Serbia) SRB	Filip Stamenković	24	0	20	0	1	0	3	0
6	DF	(Serbia) SRB	Miloš Nikolić	5	0	2+2	0	0	0	1	0
7	MF	(Ukraine) UKR	Maksym Drachenko	8	0	3+3	0	0	0	1+1	0
8	MF	(Kazakhstan) KAZ	Abylaykhan Nazymkhanov	24	1	17+3	1	1	0	2+1	0
9	FW	(Kazakhstan) KAZ	Aydos Tattybayev	18	0	8+8	0	0+1	0	0+1	0
10	FW	(Georgia (country)) GEO	Imeda Ashortia	28	4	19+5	4	1	0	2+1	0
11	FW	(Kazakhstan) KAZ	Aybar Abdulla	19	1	10+7	1	0	0	1+1	0
15	DF	(Kazakhstan) KAZ	Bogdan Savkiv	21	0	14+4	0	1	0	1+1	0
16	DF	(Kazakhstan) KAZ	Eskendir Kybyray	10	0	6+3	0	0	0	1	0
17	MF	(Belarus) BLR	Dmitry Lisakovich	13	1	4+7	1	0	0	0+2	0
18	DF	(Kazakhstan) KAZ	Ansar Altynkhan	6	1	0+5	1	0	0	0+1	0
19	MF	(Russia) RUS	Yevgeni Kozlov	14	2	6+6	1	0	0	1+1	1
20	MF	(Kazakhstan) KAZ	Dmitry Bachek	8	1	1+6	0	0+1	1	0	0
21	MF	(Bosnia and Herzegovina) BIH	Jovan Ilic	12	0	9+1	0	0	0	2	0
23	MF	(Kazakhstan) KAZ	Ruslan Tutkyshev	8	0	1+5	0	0+1	0	0+1	0
27	DF	(Kazakhstan) KAZ	Shakhsultan Zubaydilda	4	0	3	0	0	0	1	0
29	FW	(Kazakhstan) KAZ	Daniyal Takhanov	7	0	1+5	0	0	0	0+1	0
33	DF	(Russia) RUS	Layonel Adams	6	0	6	0	0	0	0	0
40	GK	(Kazakhstan) KAZ	Yegor Tsuprikov	21	0	20	0	0	0	1	0
44	DF	(Kazakhstan) KAZ	Almas Tyulyubay	20	0	14+3	0	1	0	2	0
60	DF	(Colombia) COL	Francisco Campo	8	0	8	0	0	0	0	0
68	DF	(Kazakhstan) KAZ	Alexandr Migunov	11	0	4+5	0	0	0	2	0
88	MF	(Colombia) COL	Roger Cañas	26	4	22	2	1	0	3	2
95	GK	(Kazakhstan) KAZ	Danila Karpikov	1	0	0+1	0	0	0	0	0
97	FW	(Serbia) SRB	Milan Đokić	12	2	9+1	1	0	0	2	1
Players away from Shakhter Karagandy on loan:
Players who left Shakhter Karagandy during the season:
1	GK	(Moldova) MDA	Igor Mostovei	3	0	1	0	1	0	1	0
3	DF	(Georgia (country)) GEO	Anton Tolordava	11	0	9+1	0	0	0	1	0
6	DF	(Montenegro) MNE	Mitar Ćuković	8	0	5+1	0	1	0	1	0
17	FW	(Kazakhstan) KAZ	Shyngys Flyuk	6	0	3+2	0	0+1	0	0	0
21	FW	(Kazakhstan) KAZ	Maksim Galkin	1	0	0+1	0	0	0	0	0
22	MF	(Kazakhstan) KAZ	Georgi Zakharenko	2	0	0+2	0	0	0	0	0
30	MF	(Cameroon) CMR	Arthur Bougnone	10	0	4+4	0	1	0	1	0
80	FW	(Colombia) COL	Juan Asprilla	12	0	2+8	0	1	0	0+1	0

=== Goal scorers ===
Place	Position	Nation	Number	Name	Premier League	Kazakhstan Cup	League Cup	Total
1	FW	(Georgia (country))	10	Imeda Ashortia	4	0	0	4
1	MF	(Colombia)	88	Roger Cañas	2	0	2	4
3	FW	(Serbia)	97	Milan Đokić	1	0	1	2
3	MF	(Russia)	19	Yevgeni Kozlov	1	0	1	2
5	MF	(Kazakhstan)	8	Abylaykhan Nazymkhanov	1	0	0	1
5	MF	(Belarus)	17	Dmitry Lisakovich	1	0	0	1
5	DF	(Kazakhstan)	18	Ansar Altynkhan	1	0	0	1
5	FW	(Kazakhstan)	11	Aybar Abdulla	1	0	0	1
5	MF	(Kazakhstan)	20	Dmitry Bachek	0	1	0	1
				TOTALS	12	1	4	17

=== Clean sheets ===
Place	Position	Nation	Number	Name	Premier League	Kazakhstan Cup	League Cup	Total
1	GK	(Kazakhstan)	40	Yegor Tsuprikov	3	0	0	3
2	GK	(Moldova)	1	Igor Mostovei	1	0	0	1
2	GK	(Kazakhstan)	1	Andrey Shabanov	1	0	0	1
				TOTALS	5	0	0	5

=== Disciplinary record ===
Number	Nation	Position	Name	Premier League		Kazakhstan Cup		League Cup		Total	
Number	Nation	Position	Name	Booked	Sent off (straight red)	Booked	Sent off (straight red)	Booked	Sent off (straight red)	Booked	Sent off (straight red)
2	(Kazakhstan)	DF	Egor Alishauskas	3	0	1	0	1	0	5	0
4	(Ukraine)	DF	Dmytro Ryzhuk	3	0	0	0	0	0	3	0
5	(Serbia)	DF	Filip Stamenković	3	0	1	0	1	0	5	0
6	(Serbia)	DF	Miloš Nikolić	2	0	0	0	0	0	2	0
7	(Ukraine)	MF	Maksym Drachenko	1	0	0	0	0	0	1	0
8	(Kazakhstan)	MF	Abylaykhan Nazymkhanov	2	0	0	0	0	0	2	0
9	(Kazakhstan)	FW	Aydos Tattybayev	1	0	0	0	0	0	1	0
10	(Georgia (country))	FW	Imeda Ashortia	2	0	0	0	0	0	2	0
11	(Kazakhstan)	FW	Aybar Abdulla	6	0	0	0	0	0	6	0
15	(Kazakhstan)	DF	Bogdan Savkiv	4	1	1	0	2	0	7	1
16	(Kazakhstan)	DF	Eskendir Kybyray	3	0	0	0	0	0	3	0
18	(Kazakhstan)	DF	Ansar Altynkhan	1	0	0	0	0	0	1	0
19	(Russia)	MF	Yevgeni Kozlov	2	0	0	0	0	0	2	0
21	(Bosnia and Herzegovina)	MF	Jovan Ilic	3	0	0	0	1	0	4	0
27	(Kazakhstan)	DF	Shakhsultan Zubaydilda	2	0	0	0	0	0	2	0
33	(Russia)	DF	Layonel Adams	1	2	0	0	0	0	1	2
40	(Kazakhstan)	GK	Yegor Tsuprikov	2	0	0	0	0	0	2	0
44	(Kazakhstan)	DF	Almas Tyulyubay	8	0	0	0	2	1	10	1
60	(Colombia)	DF	Francisco Campo	1	0	0	0	0	0	1	0
68	(Kazakhstan)	DF	Alexandr Migunov	1	0	0	0	0	0	1	0
88	(Colombia)	MF	Roger Cañas	8	0	0	0	1	0	9	0
97	(Serbia)	FW	Milan Đokić	2	0	0	0	0	0	2	0
Players away on loan:
Players who left Shakhter Karagandy during the season:
3	(Georgia (country))	DF	Anton Tolordava	3	0	0	0	0	0	3	0
17	(Kazakhstan)	FW	Shyngys Flyuk	1	0	0	0	0	0	1	0
30	(Cameroon)	MF	Arthur Bougnone	1	0	0	0	1	0	2	0
80	(Colombia)	FW	Juan Asprilla	1	0	0	0	0	0	1	0
			TOTALS	67	3	3	0	9	1	79	4
