= List of Kazakhstan football transfers summer 2024 =

This is a list of Kazakh football transfers during the 2024 summer transfer window.

== Kazakhstan Premier League 2024 ==
=== Aktobe ===
In: Note: Flags indicate national team as defined under FIFA eligibility rules; some limited exceptions apply. Players may hold more than one non-FIFA nationality.

| No. | Pos. | Nation | Player |
|---|---|---|---|
| 99 | FW | (Panama) PAN | Freddy Góndola (from (Israel) Maccabi Bnei Reineh) |

Out: Note: Flags indicate national team as defined under FIFA eligibility rules; some limited exceptions apply. Players may hold more than one non-FIFA nationality.

| No. | Pos. | Nation | Player |
|---|---|---|---|
| 7 | MF | (Kazakhstan) KAZ | Bauyrzhan Baytana (to (Kazakhstan) Zhenis) |
| 10 | FW | (Kazakhstan) KAZ | Maksim Samorodov (to (Russia) Akhmat Grozny) |
| 20 | MF | (Kazakhstan) KAZ | Ramazan Orazov (to (Denmark) Silkeborg) |

=== Astana ===
In: Note: Flags indicate national team as defined under FIFA eligibility rules; some limited exceptions apply. Players may hold more than one non-FIFA nationality.

| No. | Pos. | Nation | Player |
|---|---|---|---|
| 2 | DF | (Croatia) CRO | Karlo Bartolec (from (Croatia) Lokomotiva Zagreb) |
| 3 | DF | (Croatia) CRO | Branimir Kalaica (from (Croatia) Lokomotiva Zagreb) |
| 9 | FW | (Nigeria) NGA | Geoffrey Chinedu (from (China) Liaoning Tieren) |
| 77 | MF | (Albania) ALB | Nazmi Gripshi (from (Albania) Ballkani) |

Out: Note: Flags indicate national team as defined under FIFA eligibility rules; some limited exceptions apply. Players may hold more than one non-FIFA nationality.

| No. | Pos. | Nation | Player |
|---|---|---|---|
| 9 | FW | (Spain) ESP | Carlitos (to (Cyprus) Atromitos) |
| 17 | DF | (Greece) GRE | Giannis Masouras (to (Cyprus) AC Omonia) |
| 23 | MF | (France) FRA | Fabien Ourega |
| 29 | MF | (Serbia) SRB | Dušan Jovančić (to (Kazakhstan) Kyzylzhar) |
| 66 | DF | (Kazakhstan) KAZ | Talgat Kusyapov (to (Russia) KAMAZ) |

=== Atyrau ===
In: Note: Flags indicate national team as defined under FIFA eligibility rules; some limited exceptions apply. Players may hold more than one non-FIFA nationality.

| No. | Pos. | Nation | Player |

Out: Note: Flags indicate national team as defined under FIFA eligibility rules; some limited exceptions apply. Players may hold more than one non-FIFA nationality.

| No. | Pos. | Nation | Player |
|---|---|---|---|
| 9 | MF | (Portugal) POR | Pedro Eugénio (to (Kazakhstan) Tobol) |
| 12 | MF | (The Gambia) GAM | Lamine Jarjou (loan return to (France) Grenoble) |
| 27 | DF | (Kazakhstan) KAZ | Daniyar Urda (loan return to (Kazakhstan) Khan Tengri) |

=== Elimai ===
In: Note: Flags indicate national team as defined under FIFA eligibility rules; some limited exceptions apply. Players may hold more than one non-FIFA nationality.

| No. | Pos. | Nation | Player |
|---|---|---|---|
| 3 | DF | (Nigeria) NGA | Samuel Odeyobo (from (Lithuania) Hegelmann) |
| 4 | DF | (Russia) RUS | Daniil Penchikov (from (Russia) Pari NN) |
| 9 | FW | (Russia) RUS | Islam Mashukov (from (Russia) Alania Vladikavkaz) |
| 12 | MF | (Kazakhstan) KAZ | Aslan Darabayev |
| 24 | FW | (Dominican Republic) DOM | Edarlyn Reyes (from (Libya) Al-Ittihad) |
| 35 | GK | (Ukraine) UKR | Maksym Koval (from (Greece) Aris Thessaloniki) |

Out: Note: Flags indicate national team as defined under FIFA eligibility rules; some limited exceptions apply. Players may hold more than one non-FIFA nationality.

| No. | Pos. | Nation | Player |
|---|---|---|---|
| 9 | FW | (Senegal) SEN | Sada Thioub |
| 17 | DF | (Kazakhstan) KAZ | Berik Aytbaev (to (Kazakhstan) Zhenis) |
| 20 | MF | (Kazakhstan) KAZ | Mokhammed Yensebayev (to (Spain) Real Valladolid Promesas) |
| 29 | FW | (Cameroon) CMR | Robert Tambe |
| 35 | DF | (Belarus) BLR | Nikolay Zolotov (to (Belarus) Maxline Vitebsk) |
| 41 | GK | (Russia) RUS | Miroslav Lobantsev (to (Kazakhstan) Zhenis) |
| 80 | DF | (Russia) RUS | Yegor Sorokin (to (Kazakhstan) Kairat) |
| 99 | MF | (Kazakhstan) KAZ | Alen Aymanov (to (Kazakhstan) Caspiy) |

=== Kairat ===
In: Note: Flags indicate national team as defined under FIFA eligibility rules; some limited exceptions apply. Players may hold more than one non-FIFA nationality.

| No. | Pos. | Nation | Player |
|---|---|---|---|
| 14 | DF | (Belarus) BLR | Alyaksandr Martynovich (from (Russia) Rubin Kazan) |
| 33 | MF | (Serbia) SRB | Jug Stanojev (from (Serbia) Spartak Subotica) |
| 55 | MF | (Belarus) BLR | Valery Gromyko (from (Kazakhstan) Kaisar) |
| 80 | DF | (Russia) RUS | Yegor Sorokin (from (Kazakhstan) Elimai) |

Out: Note: Flags indicate national team as defined under FIFA eligibility rules; some limited exceptions apply. Players may hold more than one non-FIFA nationality.

| No. | Pos. | Nation | Player |
|---|---|---|---|
| 2 | DF | (Kazakhstan) KAZ | Egor Tkachenko (on loan to (Kazakhstan) Zhetysu) |
| 5 | DF | (Russia) RUS | Viktor Vasin |
| 18 | FW | (Kazakhstan) KAZ | Yan Trufanov (on loan to (Kazakhstan) Zhenis) |
| 25 | DF | (Kazakhstan) KAZ | Aleksandr Shirobokov (on loan to (Belarus) Slavia Mozyr) |
| 27 | GK | (Kazakhstan) KAZ | Nikita Pivkin (on loan to (Kazakhstan) Altai) |
| — | MF | (Kazakhstan) KAZ | Galymzhan Kenzhebek (to (Cyprus) Akritas Chlorakas, previously loan to (Kazakhstan) Zhenis) |

=== Kaisar ===
In: Note: Flags indicate national team as defined under FIFA eligibility rules; some limited exceptions apply. Players may hold more than one non-FIFA nationality.

| No. | Pos. | Nation | Player |
|---|---|---|---|
| 55 | GK | (Armenia) ARM | Aram Ayrapetyan |
| — | FW | (Cameroon) CMR | Junior Kameni (from (Morocco) FUS Rabat) |

Out: Note: Flags indicate national team as defined under FIFA eligibility rules; some limited exceptions apply. Players may hold more than one non-FIFA nationality.

| No. | Pos. | Nation | Player |
|---|---|---|---|
| 11 | FW | (Kazakhstan) KAZ | Bakdaulet Zulfikarov (to (Kazakhstan) Caspiy) |
| 55 | MF | (Belarus) BLR | Valery Gromyko (to (Kazakhstan) Kairat) |

=== Kyzylzhar ===
In: Note: Flags indicate national team as defined under FIFA eligibility rules; some limited exceptions apply. Players may hold more than one non-FIFA nationality.

| No. | Pos. | Nation | Player |
|---|---|---|---|
| 11 | MF | (Bosnia and Herzegovina) BIH | Andrija Drljo (from (Bosnia and Herzegovina) Željezničar Sarajevo) |
| 15 | FW | (Ivory Coast) CIV | Senin Sebai (from (Saudi Arabia) Al Jandal) |
| 29 | MF | (Serbia) SRB | Dušan Jovančić (from (Kazakhstan) Astana) |
| 55 | DF | (Moldova) MDA | Artiom Litveacov (from (Lebanon) Nejmeh) |

Out: Note: Flags indicate national team as defined under FIFA eligibility rules; some limited exceptions apply. Players may hold more than one non-FIFA nationality.

| No. | Pos. | Nation | Player |
|---|---|---|---|
| 10 | MF | (Montenegro) MNE | Boris Cmiljanić (to (Cyprus) Karmiotissa) |
| 20 | MF | (Georgia (country)) GEO | Irakli Bugridze |
| 28 | DF | (Belgium) BEL | Bryan Van Den Bogaert (to (Belgium) Knokke) |
| 33 | FW | (North Macedonia) MKD | Nikola Bogdanovski (to (Serbia) Zemun) |
| — | GK | (Belarus) BLR | Konstantin Rudenok (to (Belarus) Bumprom Gomel) |

=== Ordabasy ===
In: Note: Flags indicate national team as defined under FIFA eligibility rules; some limited exceptions apply. Players may hold more than one non-FIFA nationality.

| No. | Pos. | Nation | Player |
|---|---|---|---|
| 3 | DF | (Colombia) COL | Cristian Tovar (on loan from (Moldova) Sheriff Tiraspol) |
| 71 | GK | (Belarus) BLR | Sergey Ignatovich (from (Belarus) Shakhtyor Soligorsk) |

Out: Note: Flags indicate national team as defined under FIFA eligibility rules; some limited exceptions apply. Players may hold more than one non-FIFA nationality.

| No. | Pos. | Nation | Player |
|---|---|---|---|
| 12 | GK | (Croatia) CRO | Karlo Sentić (loan return to (Croatia) Hajduk Split) |
| 98 | FW | (The Gambia) GAM | Dembo Darboe (loan return to (United Arab Emirates) Al-Nasr) |
| — | MF | (Brazil) BRA | Victor Braga (to (Hungary) Debreceni, previously on loan to (Kazakhstan) Zhetysu) |

=== Shakhter ===
In: Note: Flags indicate national team as defined under FIFA eligibility rules; some limited exceptions apply. Players may hold more than one non-FIFA nationality.

| No. | Pos. | Nation | Player |
|---|---|---|---|
| 1 | GK | (Kazakhstan) KAZ | Andrey Shabanov |
| 6 | DF | (Serbia) SRB | Miloš Nikolić (from (Bosnia and Herzegovina) Sloga Meridian) |
| 7 | MF | (Ukraine) UKR | Maksym Drachenko |
| 16 | DF | (Kazakhstan) KAZ | Eskendir Kybyray (from (Kazakhstan) Zhetysu) |
| 17 | MF | (Belarus) BLR | Dmitry Lisakovich (from (Belarus) Torpedo-BelAZ Zhodino) |
| 19 | MF | (Russia) RUS | Yevgeni Kozlov (from (India) Mohammedan) |
| 21 | MF | (Bosnia and Herzegovina) BIH | Jovan Ilic (from (Serbia) Novi Sad) |
| 97 | FW | (Serbia) SRB | Milan Đokić (from (Serbia) Dubočica) |
| — | DF | (Colombia) COL | Francisco Campo (from (Russia) Dynamo Makhachkala) |

Out: Note: Flags indicate national team as defined under FIFA eligibility rules; some limited exceptions apply. Players may hold more than one non-FIFA nationality.

| No. | Pos. | Nation | Player |
|---|---|---|---|
| 1 | GK | (Moldova) MDA | Igor Mostovei (to (Moldova) Milsami Orhei) |
| 3 | DF | (Georgia (country)) GEO | Anton Tolordava (to (Georgia (country)) Telavi) |
| 6 | DF | (Montenegro) MNE | Mitar Ćuković (to (Montenegro) Jezero) |
| 17 | FW | (Kazakhstan) KAZ | Shyngys Flyuk (to (Kazakhstan) Ulytau) |
| 21 | FW | (Kazakhstan) KAZ | Maksim Galkin (to (Kazakhstan) Ekibastuz) |
| 22 | MF | (Kazakhstan) KAZ | Georgi Zakharenko (to (Kazakhstan) Ekibastuz) |
| 30 | MF | (Cameroon) CMR | Arthur Bougnone (to (Belarus) Slutsk) |
| 80 | FW | (Colombia) COL | Juan Asprilla (to (Georgia (country)) Aragvi Dusheti) |

=== Tobol ===
In: Note: Flags indicate national team as defined under FIFA eligibility rules; some limited exceptions apply. Players may hold more than one non-FIFA nationality.

| No. | Pos. | Nation | Player |
|---|---|---|---|
| 13 | MF | (Georgia (country)) GEO | Tsotne Mosiashvili (from (Kazakhstan) Zhetysu) |
| 17 | MF | (Kazakhstan) KAZ | Aleksandr Zuyev (from (Russia) Arsenal Tula) |
| 20 | FW | (Portugal) POR | Rui Costa (from (Portugal) Farense) |
| 99 | MF | (Portugal) POR | Pedro Eugénio (from (Kazakhstan) Atyrau) |

Out: Note: Flags indicate national team as defined under FIFA eligibility rules; some limited exceptions apply. Players may hold more than one non-FIFA nationality.

| No. | Pos. | Nation | Player |
|---|---|---|---|
| 28 | MF | (Ukraine) UKR | Yevhen Shakhov |
| 66 | DF | (Kosovo) KOS | David Domgjoni |
| 90 | FW | (Italy) ITA | Godberg Cooper (to (United Arab Emirates) Al Hamriyah) |

=== Turan ===
In: Note: Flags indicate national team as defined under FIFA eligibility rules; some limited exceptions apply. Players may hold more than one non-FIFA nationality.

| No. | Pos. | Nation | Player |
|---|---|---|---|
| 7 | MF | (Albania) ALB | Plarent Fejzaj (from (Albania) Kukësi) |
| 10 | FW | (North Macedonia) MKD | Aleksandar Mishov (from (Bulgaria) Etar Veliko Tarnovo) |
| 21 | DF | (Kazakhstan) KAZ | Berik Shaykhov (from (Kazakhstan) Khan Tengri) |
| 31 | DF | (Russia) RUS | Ivan Khomukha (from (Russia) Volgar Astrakhan) |
| 47 | DF | (Kazakhstan) KAZ | Darkhan Dyusembekov (from (Kazakhstan) Zhenis) |

Out: Note: Flags indicate national team as defined under FIFA eligibility rules; some limited exceptions apply. Players may hold more than one non-FIFA nationality.

| No. | Pos. | Nation | Player |
|---|---|---|---|
| 10 | DF | (Tunisia) TUN | Fedi Ben Choug (to (Tunisia) Etoile SS) |
| 14 | MF | (Kazakhstan) KAZ | Samat Shamshi (to (Kazakhstan) Caspiy) |
| 27 | DF | (Slovakia) SVK | Branislav Sluka (to (Slovakia) Komárno) |
| 55 | MF | (Ghana) GHA | David Mawutor (to (Tajikistan) Ravshan Kulob) |

=== Zhenis ===
In: Note: Flags indicate national team as defined under FIFA eligibility rules; some limited exceptions apply. Players may hold more than one non-FIFA nationality.

| No. | Pos. | Nation | Player |
|---|---|---|---|
| 1 | GK | (Russia) RUS | Miroslav Lobantsev (from (Kazakhstan) Elimai) |
| 6 | DF | (Kazakhstan) KAZ | Berik Aytbaev (from (Kazakhstan) Elimai) |
| 7 | MF | (Kazakhstan) KAZ | Bauyrzhan Baytana (from (Kazakhstan) Aktobe) |
| 11 | FW | (Portugal) POR | Bruno Silva (from (Portugal) Länk Vilaverdense) |
| 14 | FW | (Georgia (country)) GEO | Giorgi Pantsulaia (from (Georgia (country)) Samgurali Tsqaltubo) |
| 19 | FW | (Brazil) BRA | Adílio (from (Portugal) Penafiel) |
| 32 | MF | (Czech Republic) CZE | Lukáš Budínský (from (Czech Republic) Karviná) |
| 60 | MF | (Portugal) POR | João Oliveira (from (Portugal) Penafiel) |
| — | MF | (Kazakhstan) KAZ | David Esimbekov (on loan from (Russia) Chernomorets Novorossiysk) |
| — | FW | (Kazakhstan) KAZ | Yan Trufanov (on loan from (Kazakhstan) Kairat) |

Out: Note: Flags indicate national team as defined under FIFA eligibility rules; some limited exceptions apply. Players may hold more than one non-FIFA nationality.

| No. | Pos. | Nation | Player |
|---|---|---|---|
| 6 | DF | (Sweden) SWE | Benjamin Hjertstrand (to (Finland) Ekenäs) |
| 7 | MF | (Kazakhstan) KAZ | Rinat Khayrullin |
| 9 | FW | (Kosovo) KOS | Arb Manaj (loan return to (Kosovo) Drita) |
| 10 | MF | (Kazakhstan) KAZ | Galymzhan Kenzhebek (loan return to (Kazakhstan) Kairat) |
| 11 | MF | (Kazakhstan) KAZ | Miras Amantaev (to (Kazakhstan) Arys) |
| 14 | MF | (Georgia (country)) GEO | Irakli Bidzinashvili (to (Georgia (country)) Torpedo Kutaisi) |
| 19 | FW | (Serbia) SRB | Iljasa Zulfiu (to (Kosovo) Drita) |
| 20 | FW | (Kazakhstan) KAZ | Raul Allakhverdiev (on loan to (Kazakhstan) Okzhetpes) |
| 25 | DF | (Kazakhstan) KAZ | Sayat Zhumagali (to (Kazakhstan) Ulytau) |
| 32 | DF | (Greece) GRE | Vasilios Karagounis (to (Kosovo) Feronikeli 74) |
| 35 | DF | (Kazakhstan) KAZ | Nikita Kalmykov |
| 70 | MF | (Egypt) EGY | Alexander Jakobsen (to (Netherlands) RKC Waalwijk) |
| 77 | FW | (Kazakhstan) KAZ | Nurbol Anuarbekov (on loan to (Kazakhstan) Ulytau) |
| — | DF | (Kazakhstan) KAZ | Darkhan Dyusembekov (to (Kazakhstan) Turan, previously on loan to (Kazakhstan) SD Family) |

=== Zhetysu ===
In: Note: Flags indicate national team as defined under FIFA eligibility rules; some limited exceptions apply. Players may hold more than one non-FIFA nationality.

| No. | Pos. | Nation | Player |
|---|---|---|---|
| 9 | FW | (Russia) RUS | Ruslan Bolov (from (Russia) Rotor Volgograd) |
| 21 | DF | (Belarus) BLR | Konstantin Kuchinsky (from (Belarus) Isloch Minsk Raion) |
| 27 | MF | (Albania) ALB | Shqiprim Taipi (from (Kosovo) Gjilani) |
| 55 | MF | (Germany) GER | Meik Karwot (from (Poland) Pogoń Siedlce) |
| — | MF | (Georgia (country)) GEO | Temur Chogadze (from (Uzbekistan) Nasaf) |
| — | DF | (Kazakhstan) KAZ | Egor Tkachenko (on loan from (Kazakhstan) Kairat) |

Out: Note: Flags indicate national team as defined under FIFA eligibility rules; some limited exceptions apply. Players may hold more than one non-FIFA nationality.

| No. | Pos. | Nation | Player |
|---|---|---|---|
| 9 | FW | (Russia) RUS | Maksim Chikanchi |
| 14 | DF | (Kazakhstan) KAZ | Eskendir Kybyray (to (Kazakhstan) Shakhter Karagandy) |
| 15 | MF | (Georgia (country)) GEO | Tsotne Mosiashvili (to (Kazakhstan) Tobol) |
| 24 | FW | (Kazakhstan) KAZ | Aliyar Mukhammed (to (Kazakhstan) Okzhetpes) |
| 88 | MF | (Brazil) BRA | Victor Braga (loan return to (Kazakhstan) Ordabasy) |
