= Alexander Jakobsen =

Footballer (born 1994)

Personal information
- Full name: Alexander Amir Adel Jakobsen
- Date of birth: 18 March 1994 (age 32)
- Place of birth: Hvidovre, Denmark
- Height: 1.80 m (5 ft 11 in)
- Position: Winger

Youth career
- Lyngby BK
- 2004–2011: FC Copenhagen
- 2011–2013: PSV

Senior career*
Years	Team	Apps	(Gls)
2013–2014	Jong PSV	6	(1)
2015–2016	Falkenbergs FF	28	(3)
2016	Bodø/Glimt	10	(0)
2017	Viborg	10	(1)
2017–2020	Norrköping	42	(3)
2019	→ Kalmar (loan)	9	(1)
2020	Sarpsborg 08	10	(0)
2020–2021	Wadi Degla	13	(1)
2021–2023	Smouha	7	(0)
2023–2024	Dinamo Batumi	18	(3)
2024	Zhenis	5	(0)
2024–2025	RKC Waalwijk	5	(0)

International career
2011–2012	Denmark U17	27	(9)
2013–2014	Denmark U19	5	(0)
2013–2014	Egypt U20	5	(0)
2017	Egypt	1	(0)
Medal record
Men's football
Representing Egypt
Africa U-20 Cup of Nations
Winner	2013 Algeria
- * Club domestic league appearances and goals as of 7 June 2025

Alexander Amir Adel Jakobsen (Arabic: ألكسندر أمير عادل ياكوبسن; born 18 March 1994) is a professional footballer who plays as a winger. Born in Denmark, he has represented the Egypt national team.

== Club career ==
Jakobsen began his career playing for Lyngby BK and later transferred to F.C. Copenhagen then to PSV.

Falkenbergs FF, which Jakobsen joined in 2015, announced mid-June 2016 that there had been a controversy between two teammates during a training session, wherein one player had struck another. The club later terminated Jakobsen's contract on 23 June 2016. It was later revealed that Jakobsen had struck a teammate with an icebag, causing him to bleed.

FK Bodø/Glimt signed Jakobsen on a free transfer on 17 August 2016. His contract ran through 2017.

In December 2020, Jakobsen joined Egyptian Premier League club Wadi Degla, on a free transfer. On 19 September 2021, he joined Smouha signing a three-year contract, after rival Wadi Degla was relegated.

On 29 December 2022, after terminating his contract with Smouha in August 2022, Jakobsen joined Georgian club Dinamo Batumi, on a one-year contract.

On 11 April 2024, Jakobsen signed with Zhenis in Kazakhstan.

On 13 August 2024, Jakobsen moved to RKC Waalwijk in the Netherlands on a one-season contract.

== Career statistics ==
As of match played on 15 November 2024

Season	Club	Division	League		Cup		Other		Total	
Season	Club	Division	Apps	Goals	Apps	Goals	Apps	Goals	Apps	Goals
2013–14	Jong PSV	Eerste Divisie	6	1	0	0	0	0	6	1
2015	Falkenbergs FF	Allsvenskan	17	2	1	1	2 (Note: Appearances in Allsvenskan Relegation play-offs)	0	20	3
2016	Falkenbergs FF	Allsvenskan	11	1	3	0	0	0	14	1
2016	Bodø/Glimt	Tippeligaen	10	0	2	0	0	0	12	0
2016–17	Viborg FF	Danish Superliga	10	1	0	0	5 (Note: Appearances in Danish Superliga Relegation play-offs)	1	15	2
2017	IFK Norrköping	Allsvenskan	14	2	1	1	0	0	15	3
2018	IFK Norrköping	Allsvenskan	21	1	3	1	0	0	24	2
2019	IFK Norrköping	Allsvenskan	7	0	0	0	0	0	7	0
2019	Kalmar	Allsvenskan	9	1	0	0	1 (Note: Appearances in Allsvenskan Relegation play-offs)	0	10	1
2020	Sarpsborg 08	Eliteserien	10	0	0	0	0	0	10	0
2020–21	Wadi Degla	Egyptian Premier League	13	1	1	0	0	0	14	1
2021–22	Smouha	Egyptian Premier League	6	0	0	0	0	0	6	0
2023	Dinamo Batumi	Erovnuli Liga	18	3	3	1	3 (Note: 2 appearances in Georgian Super Cup and 1 appearance in UEFA Champions League)	0	24	4
2024	Zhenis	Kazakhstan Premier League	5	0	1	0	0	0	6	0
2024–25	RKC Waalwijk	Eredivisie	3	0	0	0	0	0	3	0
Career Total			160	13	15	4	11	1	186	18

== International career ==
=== Danish youth team ===
Jakobsen's father Adel immigrated from Egypt and his mother is from Denmark. Jakobsen played 29 games with the Danish U17 team and 5 games with the Danish U19 team.

=== Egypt ===
In 2013, he accepted the Egypt U20 youth coach Rabie Yassin invitation to an Egypt U20 training camp. He was part of the Egyptian team that won the 2013 African U-20 Championship.

On 14 March 2017 he received his first call up to Egypt's national team for the friendly against Togo.

== Honours ==
=== National team ===
- 2013 African U-20 Championship (1) : 2013
