= Benjamin Hjertstrand =

Swedish footballer

Personal information
- Full name: Benjamin Hjertstrand
- Date of birth: 22 January 1994 (age 32)
- Place of birth: Falun, Sweden
- Height: 1.80 m (5 ft 11 in)
- Position: Defender

Team information
- Current team: EIF
- Number: 6

Youth career
- Slätta

Senior career*
Years	Team	Apps	(Gls)
2012–2013	Falu	32	(1)
2014–2016	Dalkurd	31	(0)
2016	→ IK Brage (loan)	2	(0)
2017–2019	IK Brage	81	(7)
2020–2022	Örebro	78	(0)
2023	Halmstad	8	(0)
2024	Zhenis	5	(0)
2024–	EIF	10	(0)
- * Club domestic league appearances and goals as of 19 October 2024

Benjamin Hjertstrand (born 22 January 1994) is a Swedish football defender who plays for Veikkausliiga club Ekenäs IF (EIF).

== Career ==
On 24 January 2024, Kazakhstan Premier League club Zhenis announced the signing of Hjertstrand.

In August 2024, he joined Finnish Veikkausliiga club Ekenäs IF (EIF) for the remainder of the season.

== Career statistics ==
As of 23 October 2024.

Appearances and goals by club, season and competition
Club	Season	League			Cup (Note: Includes Svenska Cupen and Kazakhstan Cup)		Other		Total	
Club	Season	Division	Apps	Goals	Apps	Goals	Apps	Goals	Apps	Goals
Falu	2012	Swedish Division 2	15	0	1	0	–		16	0
Falu	2013	Swedish Division 2	17	1	–		–		17	1
Falu	Total		32	1	1	0	0	0	33	1
Dalkurd	2014	Swedish Division 1	13	0	3	0	–		16	0
Dalkurd	2015	Swedish Division 1	13	0	0	0	–		13	0
Dalkurd	2016	Superettan	6	0	0	0	–		6	0
Dalkurd	Total		32	0	3	0	0	0	35	0
IK Brage (loan)	2016	Swedish Division 1	2	0	–		–		2	0
IK Brage	2017	Swedish Division 1	24	3	1	1	–		25	4
IK Brage	2018	Superettan	27	3	0	0	–		27	3
IK Brage	2019	Superettan	30	2	0	0	2 (Note: Includes Allsvenskan promotion play-offs)	0	32	2
IK Brage	Total		81	8	1	1	2	0	84	9
Örebro	2020	Allsvenskan	25	0	1	0	–		26	0
Örebro	2021	Allsvenskan	28	0	4	0	–		32	0
Örebro	2022	Superettan	25	0	2	0	–		27	0
Örebro	Total		78	0	7	0	0	0	85	0
Halmstad	2023	Allsvenskan	8	0	4	1	–		12	1
Zhenis	2024	Kazakhstan Premier League	5	0	1	0	0 (Note: Includes Kazakhstan League Cup)	0	6	0
Ekenäs IF	2024	Veikkausliiga	10	0	–		–		10	0
Career total			248	9	17	2	2	0	267	10
