= 2020–21 Wadi Degla SC season =

Wadi Degla SC
2020–21 season
- Manager: Nikodimos Papavasiliou (until 21 January); Abdelbaki Gamal (22–31 January); Mario Salas (from 1 February to 27 May); Abdelbaki Gamal (from 27 May)
- Stadium: Al Salam Stadium
- Egyptian Premier League: 16th (relegated)
- Egypt Cup: Quarter-finals

The 2020–21 season was the 19th season in the history of the Wadi Degla SC, and the club's 12th consecutive season in the Egyptian Premier League. In addition to the domestic league, the team participated in the Egypt Cup.

== Competitions ==
=== Overall record ===
Competition	First match	Last match	Starting round	Final position	Record							
Competition	First match	Last match	Starting round	Final position	Pld	W	D	L	GF	GA	GD	Win %
Egyptian Premier League	12 December 2020		Matchday 1	16th	34	5	15	14	31	40	−9	14.71
Egypt Cup	11 February 2021	29 April 2021	Round of 32	Quarter-finals	3	2	0	1	5	3	+2	66.67
Total					37	7	15	15	36	43	−7	18.92

Source: Competitions

=== Egyptian Premier League ===
==== League table ====
Pos	Team	Pld	W	D	L	GF	GA	GD	Pts	Qualification or relegation
14	National Bank of Egypt	34	6	17	11	39	44	−5	35	
15	Ghazl El Mahalla	34	7	14	13	28	41	−13	35	
16	Wadi Degla (R)	34	5	15	14	29	38	−9	30	Relegation to the Second Division
17	El Entag El Harby (R)	34	5	13	16	35	60	−25	28	Relegation to the Second Division
18	Aswan (R)	34	6	9	19	29	61	−32	27	Relegation to the Second Division

Source: Soccerway
Rules for classification: 1) Points; 2) Head-to-Head points; 3) Head-to-Head goal difference; 4) Head-to-Head goals scored; 5) Head-to-Head away goals scored; 6) Goal difference; 7) Goals scored.
(Note: Head-to-head record is used only after all the matches between the teams in question have been played).
(R) Relegated

==== Results summary ====
Overall								Home						Away					
Pld	W	D	L	GF	GA	GD	Pts	W	D	L	GF	GA	GD	W	D	L	GF	GA	GD
34	5	15	14	31	40	−9	30	2	8	7	12	18	−6	3	7	7	19	22	−3

==== Results by round ====
Round	1	2	3	4	5	6	7	8	9	10	11	12
Ground	A	H	A	H	A	H	A	H	A	H	A	H
Result	D	W	D	L	D	L	L	L	L	D	L	L
Position												

A = Away; H = Home; W = Win; D = Draw; L = Loss

==== Matches ====
The match schedule was released on 23 November 2020.

12 December 2020 1	National Bank	1–1	Wadi Degla	Cairo
				Stadium: Police Academy Stadium

16 December 2020 2	Wadi Degla	2–1	Al Mokawloon Al Arab	Cairo
				Stadium: Al Salam Stadium

24 December 2020 4	Wadi Degla	1–2	Smouha	Cairo
				Stadium: Al Salam Stadium

1 January 2021 5	Al Ahly	0–0	Wadi Degla	Cairo
				Stadium: Al Salam Stadium

8 January 2021 6	Wadi Degla	1–2	ENPPI	Cairo
				Stadium: Al Salam Stadium

11 January 2021 3	Pyramids	1–1	Wadi Degla	Cairo
				Stadium: 30 June Stadium

15 January 2021 7	Tala'ea El Gaish	1–0	Wadi Degla	Cairo
				Stadium: Gehaz El Reyada Stadium

20 January 2021 8	Wadi Degla	1–3	Al Masry	Alexandria
				Stadium: Borg El Arab Stadium

24 January 2021 9	El Gouna	2–0	Wadi Degla	El Gouna
				Stadium: Khaled Bichara Stadium

29 January 2021 10	Wadi Degla	0–0	Aswan	Cairo
				Stadium: Al Salam Stadium

20 February 2021 11	Misr Lel Makkasa	3–1	Wadi Degla	Cairo
				Stadium: Osman Ahmed Osman Stadium

7 February 2021 12	Wadi Degla	0–1	Ghazl El Mahalla	Cairo
				Stadium: Al Salam Stadium

=== Egypt Cup ===
11 February 2021 Round of 32	Wadi Degla	3–1	National Bank

15 April 2021 Round of 16	Wadi Degla	1–0	Al Ittihad

29 April 2021 Quarter-finals	Wadi Degla	1–2	Petrojet
