= Layonel Adams =

Russian footballer (1994–2026)

Personal information
- Full name: Layonel Rasakovich Adams
- Date of birth: 9 August 1994
- Place of birth: Saint Petersburg, Russia
- Date of death: 14 January 2026 (aged 31)
- Place of death: Zvenigorod, Russia
- Height: 1.89 m (6 ft 2 in)
- Position: Centre-back

Youth career
- 2011–2014: CSKA Moscow

Senior career*
| Years | Team | Apps | (Gls) |
| 2012–2014 | CSKA Moscow | 0 | (0) |
| 2014–2015 | Yenisey Krasnoyarsk | 6 | (0) |
| 2015 | → Volga Tver (loan) | 5 | (0) |
| 2015–2016 | KAMAZ Naberezhnye Chelny | 2 | (0) |
| 2016–2017 | Banants | 24 | (0) |
| 2017–2018 | Cerceda | 16 | (0) |
| 2019 | Isloch Minsk Raion | 17 | (0) |
| 2020 | Caspiy | 15 | (0) |
| 2021 | Turan | 15 | (0) |
| 2022 | Van | 4 | (0) |
| 2022 | Budućnost Podgorica | 0 | (0) |
| 2023 | Khujand | 11 | (2) |
| 2023 | Zhetysu | 11 | (0) |
| 2024 | Shakhter Karagandy | 6 | (0) |
| 2025 | Alga Bishkek | 1 | (0) |

International career
| 2011–2012 | Russia U18 | 4 | (0) |
- * Club domestic league appearances and goals

Layonel Rasakovich Adams (Russian: Лайонел Расакович Адамс; 9 August 1994 – 14 January 2026) was a Russian professional footballer who played as a centre-back.

== Career ==
Adams made his professional debut in the Russian Football National League for FC Yenisey Krasnoyarsk on 16 March 2014 in a game against FC SKA-Energiya Khabarovsk.

On 16 March 2022, Adams signed for Armenian Premier League club FC Van.

On 14 June 2022, Budućnost Podgorica announced the signing of Adams.

On 3 February 2023, Tajikistan Higher League club Khujand announced the signing of Adams.

On 5 July 2023, Zhetysu announced the signing of Adams.

== Personal life and death ==
Adams' father was Nigerian and his mother Russian. His brother Lyukman Adams is an Olympic triple jumper.

Adams died on 14 January 2026, after falling out of the window of a high-rise building. He was 31.

== Career statistics ==
As of match played 27 October 2024

Appearances and goals by club, season and competition
| Club | Season | League | | | National cup | | Continental | | Other | | Total | |
| Club | Season | Division | Apps | Goals | Apps | Goals | Apps | Goals | Apps | Goals | Apps | Goals |
|---|---|---|---|---|---|---|---|---|---|---|---|---|
| CSKA Moscow | 2013–14 | Russian Premier League | 0 | 0 | 0 | 0 | 0 | 0 | – | | 0 | 0 |
| Yenisey Krasnoyarsk | 2013–14 | Russian National League | 6 | 0 | 0 | 0 | – | | – | | 6 | 0 |
| Yenisey Krasnoyarsk | 2014–15 | Russian National League | 0 | 0 | 0 | 0 | – | | – | | 0 | 0 |
| Yenisey Krasnoyarsk | Total | | 6 | 0 | 0 | 0 | 0 | 0 | 0 | 0 | 6 | 0 |
| Volga Tver (loan) | 2014–15 | Russian Football League | 5 | 0 | 0 | 0 | – | | – | | 5 | 0 |
| KAMAZ | 2015–16 | Russian National League | 2 | 0 | 1 | 0 | – | | – | | 3 | 0 |
| Banants | 2015–16 | Armenian Premier League | 8 | 0 | 3 | 0 | – | | – | | 11 | 0 |
| Banants | 2016–17 | Armenian Premier League | 16 | 0 | 4 | 0 | 2 | 0 | 1 | 0 | 23 | 0 |
| Banants | Total | | 24 | 0 | 7 | 0 | 2 | 0 | 1 | 0 | 34 | 0 |
| Cerceda | 2017–18 | Segunda División B | 16 | 0 | 0 | 0 | – | | – | | 16 | 0 |
| Isloch Minsk Raion | 2019 | Belarusian Premier League | 17 | 0 | 5 | 0 | – | | – | | 22 | 0 |
| Caspiy | 2020 | Kazakhstan Premier League | 15 | 0 | 0 | 0 | – | | – | | 15 | 0 |
| Turan | 2021 | Kazakhstan Premier League | 15 | 0 | 2 | 0 | – | | – | | 17 | 0 |
| Van | 2021–22 | Armenian Premier League | 4 | 0 | 0 | 0 | – | | – | | 4 | 0 |
| Budućnost Podgorica | 2022–23 | Montenegrin First League | 0 | 0 | 0 | 0 | 0 | 0 | – | | 0 | 0 |
| Khujand | 2023 | Tajikistan Higher League | 11 | 2 | 0 | 0 | 0 | 0 | – | | 11 | 2 |
| Zhetysu | 2023 | Kazakhstan Premier League | 11 | 0 | 0 | 0 | – | | – | | 11 | 0 |
| Shakhter Karagandy | 2024 | Kazakhstan Premier League | 6 | 0 | 0 | 0 | – | | 0 | 0 | 6 | 0 |
| Career total | | | 132 | 2 | 15 | 0 | 2 | 0 | 1 | 0 | 151 | 2 |
