= Dmitry Bachek =

Kazakhstani footballer (born 2000)

Personal information
- Full name: Dmitry Viktorovich Bachek
- Date of birth: 13 December 2000 (age 25)
- Place of birth: Karaganda, Kazakhstan
- Height: 1.68 m (5 ft 6 in)
- Position: Midfielder

Youth career
- 2015–2016: Olé Brasil

Senior career*
Years	Team	Apps	(Gls)
2018–2019	Shakhter Karagandy	6	(0)
2018–2019	→ Shakhter Karagandy U21	37	(15)
2019	→ Shakhter-Bulat Temirtau	6	(0)
2020–2021	Poblense	5	(0)
2021	Antequera	5	(0)
2022	Aksu	7	(0)
2023	Arsenal Dzerzhinsk	26	(4)
2024	Shakhter Karagandy	7	(0)

International career
2018	Kazakhstan U19	2	(0)
2019	Kazakhstan U21	5	(1)
- * Club domestic league appearances and goals as of 16 November 2024

Dmitry Viktorovich Bachek (Russian: Дмитрий Викторович Бачек; born 13 December 2000) is a Kazakhstani footballer who plays as a midfielder.

== Career ==
As a youth player, Bachek joined the youth academy of Brazilian side Olé Brasil.

Bachek started his career with Kazakhstani top flight club Shakhter, where he made seven appearances, attracted the interest of VfB Stuttgart in the German second division, and almost joined the youth academy of Italian Serie A team Roma but the transfer never happened.

In 2019, Bachek played for Shakhter's farm club Shakhter-Bulat Temirtau in the Kazakhstani second division.

In 2020, he signed for Spanish third division outfit Poblense after receiving interest from Croatia.
