= Filip Stamenković =

Serbian footballer

Personal information
- Date of birth: 15 September 1998 (age 28)
- Place of birth: Niš, FR Yugoslavia
- Height: 1.91 m (6 ft 3 in)
- Position: Defender

Team information
- Current team: Garudayaksa
- Number: 28

Youth career
- –2017: Voždovac

Senior career*
Years	Team	Apps	(Gls)
2017–2019	Radnički Beograd	0	(0)
2019–2020	Dinamo Vranje	19	(1)
2020–2021	Zlatibor Čajetina	22	(0)
2021–2022	Veles Moscow	28	(1)
2023	Metallurg Bekabad	4	(0)
2024	Shakhter Karagandy	20	(0)
2025–2026	Dinamo Jug	37	(2)
2026–	Garudayaksa	1	(0)
- * Club domestic league appearances and goals as of 6 September 2026

Filip Stamenković (Serbian Cyrillic: Филип Стаменковић; born 15 September 1998) is a Serbian football player who plays for Super League club Garudayaksa.

== Club career ==
He made his debut in the Russian Football National League for FC Veles Moscow on 29 August 2021 in a game against FC Akron Tolyatti.

On 10 August 2026, Stamenković signing a contract with Indonesian Super League side Garudayaksa for the 2026–27 season.
