= Dmytro Ryzhuk =

Ukrainian footballer

Dmytro Ryzhuk Дмитро Рижук
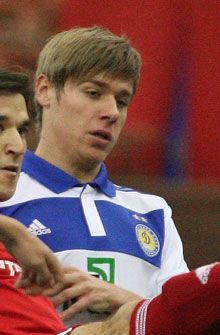

Personal information
- Full name: Dmytro Yuriyovych Ryzhuk
- Date of birth: 5 April 1992 (age 34)
- Place of birth: Kyiv, Ukraine
- Height: 1.81 m (5 ft 11 1/2 in)
- Position: Defender

Team information
- Current team: Atyrau
- Number: 2

Youth career
- 2005–2009: Dynamo Kyiv

Senior career*
Years	Team	Apps	(Gls)
2009–2016	Dynamo Kyiv	0	(0)
2009–2014	→ Dynamo-2 Kyiv	118	(2)
2015–2016	→ Metalist Kharkiv (loan)	29	(2)
2016–2017	Hapoel Acre	37	(5)
2017–2018	Hapoel Afula	30	(1)
2018–2019	Chornomorets Odesa	44	(2)
2020	Minsk	23	(1)
2021–2023	Okzhetpes	60	(1)
2024	Shakhter Karagandy	23	(0)
2025–	Atyrau	7	(0)

International career
2007–2008	Ukraine U16	13	(0)
2008–2009	Ukraine U17	13	(0)
2009–2010	Ukraine U18	7	(0)
2011	Ukraine U19	2	(0)
2012	Ukraine U20	1	(0)
2012–2014	Ukraine U21	17	(3)
- * Club domestic league appearances and goals as of 2 November 2025

Dmytro Ryzhuk (Ukrainian: Дмитро Юрійович Рижук; born 5 April 1992) is a Ukrainian football midfielder for Atyrau.

== Career ==
Ryzhuk is a product of the FC Dynamo youth sport school.

He made his debut in the Ukrainian Premier League as playing for FC Metalist in the match against FC Dynamo Kyiv on 1 March 2015.
