= Igor Mostovei =

Moldovan footballer

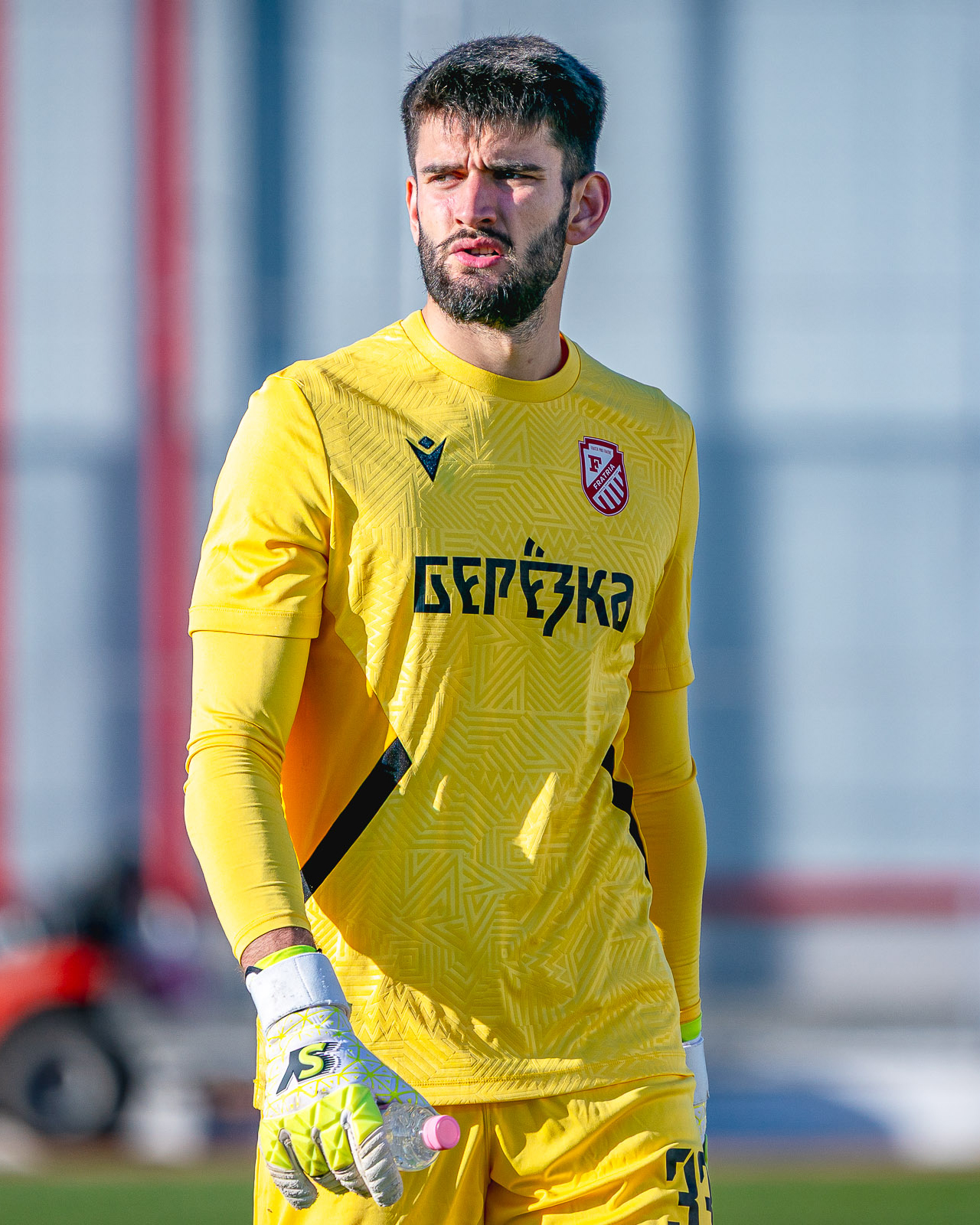
- Mostovei while playing for Fratria in 2025.

Personal information
- Date of birth: 25 September 1999 (age 27)
- Place of birth: Sîngera, Moldova
- Height: 1.97 m (6 ft 5 1/2 in)
- Position: Goalkeeper

Team information
- Current team: FK TransINVEST
- Number: 25

Youth career
- –2020: Speranța Nisporeni

Senior career*
Years	Team	Apps	(Gls)
2019–2020	Speranța Nisporeni	5	(0)
2020–2023	Petrocub Hîncești	18	(0)
2021	→ Codru Lozova (loan)	8	(0)
2023–2024	Zimbru Chișinău	4	(0)
2024	Shakhter Karagandy	1	(0)
2024	Milsami Orhei	1	(0)
2025–2026	Fratria	46	(0)
2026–	FK TransINVEST	9	(0)
- * Club domestic league appearances and goals as of 22:23, 2 October 2026 (UTC)

Igor Mostovei (born 25 September 1999) is a Moldovan professional footballer who plays as a goalkeeper for FK TransINVEST.

== Career ==
Mostovei began his career at Speranța Nisporeni. In 2020 he moved to Petrocub Hîncești with spending a loan to Codru Lozova in 2021. He was released from the team in January 2023.

Mostovei made his debut in UEFA Conference League on 13 July 2023 for Zimbru Chișinău, in a match against La Fiorita. 2 weeks later, he started for Zimbru against Fenerbahçe. In January 2024 he left Zimbru to join Kazakhstani team Shakhter Karagandy.

On 13 January 2025 he was released from Milsami after playing in just one game. The same day he was announced as the new signing of the Bulgarian Second League team Fratria. On 22 May 2025 he got his contract extended until summer of 2026.

== Career statistics ==
=== Club ===
As of 26 May 2026

Club performance			League		Cup		Continental		Total	
Club	League	Season	Apps	Goals	Apps	Goals	Apps	Goals	Apps	Goals
Speranța Nisporeni	Divizia Națională	2019	5	0	1	0	0	0	6	0
Petrocub Hîncești	Divizia Națională	2020–21	0	0	0	0	0	0	0	0
Petrocub Hîncești	Divizia Națională	2021–22	10	0	1	0	0	0	11	0
Petrocub Hîncești	Super Liga	2022–23	8	0	0	0	0	0	8	0
Petrocub Hîncești	Total		18	0	1	0	0	0	19	0
Codru Lozova (loan)	Divizia Națională	2020–21	8	0	1	0	—		9	0
Zimbru Chișinău	Super Liga	2023–24	4	0	0	0	2	0	6	0
Shakhter Karagandy	Kazakh Premier League	2024	1	0	1	0	—		2	0
Milsami	Super Liga	2024–25	1	0	0	0	0	0	1	0
Fratria	Second League	2024–25	15	0	0	0	—		15	0
Fratria	Second League	2025–26	31	0	0	0	—		31	0
Fratria	Total		46	0	0	0	0	0	46	0
Career statistics			83	0	4	0	2	0	89	0
