= Meik Karwot =

German footballer

Personal information
- Full name: Meik Adalbert Karwot
- Date of birth: 27 February 1993 (age 33)
- Place of birth: Würselen, Germany
- Height: 1.87 m (6 ft 2 in)
- Position: Defensive midfielder

Team information
- Current team: Zhetysu
- Number: 55

Youth career
- –2008: 1.FC Köln
- 2009–2010: Alemannia Aachen
- 2011–2012: Borussia Mönchengladbach

Senior career*
Years	Team	Apps	(Gls)
2012–2014	Hannover 96 II	21	(1)
2014	Fostiras	1	(0)
2014	SVN Zweibrücken	7	(0)
2015–2016	Wormatia Worms	29	(0)
2016–2017	Lüneburger SK Hansa	5	(0)
2017–2018	Górnik Zabrze	9	(0)
2017–2018	Górnik Zabrze II	10	(0)
2018	→ Pogoń Siedlce (loan)	8	(1)
2018–2022	Radomiak Radom	100	(10)
2023–2024	Zagłębie Sosnowiec	23	(2)
2024	Pogoń Siedlce	13	(1)
2024–	Zhetysu	19	(0)
- * Club domestic league appearances and goals as of 2 November 2025

Meik Karwot (born 27 February 1993) is a German professional footballer who plays as a defensive midfielder for Kazakh club Zhetysu.

== Career ==
Karwot was born in Würselen, Germany. After failing to make an appearance for German Bundesliga side Hannover 96, he signed for Fostiras in the Greek second division. However, he soon left due to financial issues and returned to Germany, where he played for fourth division clubs SVN Zweibrücken, as well as Wormatia Worms.

For the second half of the 2016–17 season, Karwot joined Górnik Zabrze, helping them achieve promotion to Ekstraklasa but suffering an injury in the process.

In 2018, he signed for another Polish second division team, Radomiak Radom.

After leaving Radomiak at the end of the 2022–23 season, Karwot remained a free agent until 9 January 2023, when he signed with Zagłębie Sosnowiec until the end of June 2024.

Shortly after terminating his contract with Zagłębie, Karwot re-signed with Pogoń Siedlce on 7 February 2024. After winning the 2023–24 II liga title, Karwot left the club at the end of the season.

In mid-July 2024, he moved to Kazakhstan Premier League club Zhetysu.

== Honours ==
Radomiak Radom

- I liga: 2020–21
- II liga: 2018–19

Pogoń Siedlce

- II liga: 2023–24
