= Konstantin Rudenok =

Belarusian footballer

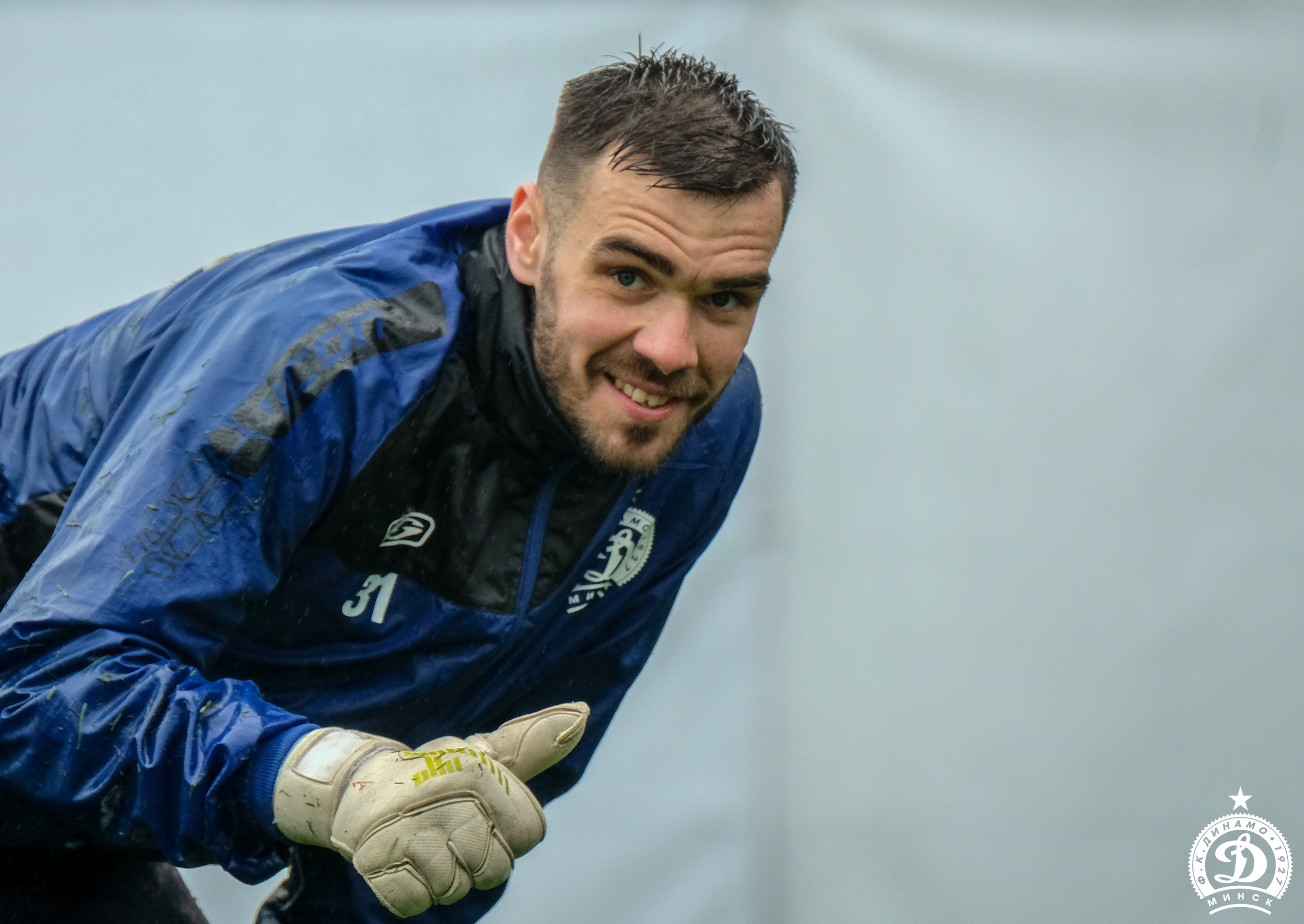

Personal information
- Date of birth: 15 December 1990 (age 35)
- Place of birth: Gomel, Belarusian SSR
- Height: 1.91 m (6 ft 3 in)
- Position: Goalkeeper

Youth career
- 2007–2011: Gomel

Senior career*
| Years | Team | Apps | (Gls) |
| 2011–2012 | Gomel | 0 | (0) |
| 2012 | Naftan Novopolotsk | 1 | (0) |
| 2013–2014 | Dinamo Brest | 29 | (0) |
| 2015–2016 | Slutsk | 11 | (0) |
| 2016 | Isloch Minsk Raion | 12 | (0) |
| 2017 | Gomel | 11 | (0) |
| 2017–2018 | Dinamo Brest | 2 | (0) |
| 2018 | → Torpedo Minsk (loan) | 15 | (0) |
| 2018–2019 | Armavir | 43 | (0) |
| 2020 | Dinamo Minsk | 1 | (0) |
| 2021 | Sputnik Rechitsa | 11 | (0) |
| 2021 | Shakhtyor Soligorsk | 0 | (0) |
| 2022 | Isloch Minsk Raion | 3 | (0) |
| 2022–2023 | Neman Grodno | 25 | (0) |
| 2024 | Kyzylzhar | 0 | (0) |
| 2024 | Bumprom Gomel | 1 | (0) |
- * Club domestic league appearances and goals as of 28 October 2024

Konstantin Rudenok (Belarusian: Канстанцiн Рудзянок; Russian: Константин Руденок; born 15 December 1990) is a Belarusian footballer who plays as a goalkeeper.

== Honours ==
Dinamo Brest

- Belarusian Cup winner: 2017–18
