= Milan Đokić (footballer) =

Serbian footballer

Personal information
- Date of birth: 12 September 1997 (age 29)
- Place of birth: Leskovac, FR Yugoslavia
- Height: 1.86 m (6 ft 1 in)
- Position: Centre-forward

Youth career
- Spartak Subotica

Senior career*
Years	Team	Apps	(Gls)
2015–2017	Spartak Subotica	0	(0)
2015–2016	→ TSC (loan)	18	(3)
2016	→ ČSK Čelarevo (loan)	1	(0)
2017	→ TSC (loan)	12	(1)
2017	→ Bačka 1901 (loan)	2	(0)
2018	Moravac Mrštane	30	(17)
2019–2020	Zlatibor Čajetina	53	(10)
2021	TSC	2	(0)
2021–2023	Bregalnica Štip	54	(12)
2023–2024	Dubočica	30	(4)
2024	Shakhter Karagandy	10	(1)
2025	FA Šiauliai	34	(13)
- * Club domestic league appearances and goals as of 7 January 2026

Milan Đokić (Serbian Cyrillic: Милан Ђокић; born 12 September 1997) is a Serbian footballer who plays as a centre-forward for A Lyga club FA Šiauliai.

== Career ==
=== FA Šiauliai ===
On 25 March 2025 FA Šiauliai announced about new player.

On 16 April 2025 Milan Đokić scored his debut goal in A Lyga against Riteriai Club.

== Honours ==
Individual

- Serbian SuperLiga Player of the Week: 2020–21 (Round 14)
