= Anton Tolordava =

Georgian footballer

Personal information
- Date of birth: 2 August 1996 (age 30)
- Place of birth: Georgia
- Height: 1.91 m (6 ft 3 in)
- Position: Defender

Team information
- Current team: Kauno Žalgiris
- Number: 3

Youth career
- 2014–2018: Tskhinvali

Senior career*
Years	Team	Apps	(Gls)
2015–2016	Tskhinvali	0	(0)
2018–2020	Telavi	69	(5)
2021	Levadia Tallinn	7	(1)
2021	→ Levadia Tallinn II	1	(0)
2021–2022	Telavi	32	(3)
2022	Radnički Niš	6	(0)
2023–2024	Shakhter Karagandy	33	(0)
2024	Telavi	16	(2)
2025–	Kauno Žalgiris	50	(7)
- * Club domestic league appearances and goals as of 10 August 2026

Anton Tolordava (Georgian: ანტონ თოლორდავა; born 2 August 1996) is a Georgian professional footballer who plays as a defender for Toplyga club Kauno Žalgiris.

== Career ==
Tolordava started playing with Tskhinvali before moving to Telavi. Then, he moved to Estonia to play with Levadia Tallinn, and, after a short return to Telavi, he played in Serbian SuperLiga side Radnički Niš in the first half of the 2022–23 season. After Serbia, he moved to Kazakhstan, where he became regular at center of defense of Shakhter Karagandy.

On 14 January 2025, he signed with Lithuanian club Kauno Žalgiris.

== Honours ==
Kauno Žalgiris

- Toplyga: 2025, 2026
- Lithuanian Cup: 2026
- Lithuanian Supercup: 2026
