= Miloš Nikolić (footballer, born 1994) =

Serbian footballer

Personal information
- Date of birth: 3 October 1994 (age 32)
- Place of birth: Užice, FR Yugoslavia
- Height: 1.98 m (6 ft 6 in)
- Position: Centre-back

Team information
- Current team: Jedinstvo Bijelo Polje
- Number: 23

Youth career
- Sloboda Užice

Senior career*
Years	Team	Apps	(Gls)
2012–2014	Sloga Bajina Bašta		
2014	Sloga Požega	10	(0)
2015–2017	Sloboda Užice	35	(2)
2015–2016	→ Sloga Bajina Bašta (loan)	22	(2)
2018	Slutsk	17	(2)
2019	Kokand 1912	5	(0)
2019	Sloboda Užice	0	(0)
2020–2021	Mladost Doboj Kakanj	19	(2)
2021	Zlatibor Čajetina	8	(0)
2021–2022	Loznica	45	(3)
2023–2024	Sloga Doboj	38	(4)
2024	Shakhter Karagandy	5	(0)
2025-	Jedinstvo Bijelo Polje	32	(2)
- * Club domestic league appearances and goals as of 1 June 2026

Miloš Nikolić (Serbian Cyrillic: Милош Николић; born 3 October 1994) is a Serbian professional footballer who plays as a centre-back for Jedinstvo Bijelo Polje.

== Club career ==
=== Sloboda Užice ===
Born in Užice, Nikolić started his career with Drina Zone League side Sloga Bajina Bašta, where he performed as a bonus player between 2012 and 2014. He also played with Sloga Požega in the first half of the 2014–15 season, making 10 appearances in the Serbian League West. In the winter break off-season, Nikolić joined Sloboda Užice, and spent the rest of it as a reserve player. He noted 1 appearance for the club, replacing Nikola Lekić in the 25 fixture match against Proleter Novi Sad.

In summer 2015, Nikolić left the club for a one-year period and moved on loan to Sloga Bajina Bašta. During the 2015–16 season, Nikolić played mostly matches in the Drina Zone League, scoring two goals, against Radnički Stobex and Budućnost Arilje.

Returning from loan in the first team of Sloboda Užice, Nikolić passed complete summer pre-season with the club. As the club started new season with deficit of experienced centre-backs, Nikolić started the 2016–17 Serbian First League competition as the first choice. He scored two goals in the 9th fixture home match against ČSK Čelarevo.

=== Slutsk ===
On 12 March 2018, Nikolić officially promoted as a new member of the Belarusian Premier League side Slutsk. Nikolić made his debut for new club in first leg of the quarterfinal cup match against Dynamo Brest on 14 March 2018, when he replaced Ihar Yasinski in 71 minute of the game. He also appeared in second leg, playing a full-time match four days later, on 18 March. Nikolić made his Belarusian Premier League debut in 3–1 defeat against BATE at the Borisov Arena on 28 April 2018. Nikolić scored his first goal for Slutsk in 2–0 away victory over Minsk on 11 May 2018. He also scored in 1–1 draw to Dynamo Brest on 23 May 2018.

== Career statistics ==
As of 31 December 2018

Appearances and goals by club, season and competition
Club	Season	League			Cup		Continental		Other		Total	
Club	Season	Division	Apps	Goals	Apps	Goals	Apps	Goals	Apps	Goals	Apps	Goals
Sloga Požega	2014–15	Serbian League West	10	0	—		—		—		10	0
Sloga Bajina Bašta (loan)	2015–16	Drina Zone League	22	2	—		—		—		22	2
Sloboda Užice	2014–15	Serbian First League	1	0	—		—		—		1	0
Sloboda Užice	2015–16	Serbian First League	0	0	—		—		—		0	0
Sloboda Užice	2016–17	Serbian First League	23	2	4	0	—		—		27	2
Sloboda Užice	2017–18	Serbian First League	11	0	1	0	—		—		12	0
Sloboda Užice	Total		35	2	5	0	—		—		40	2
Slutsk	2018	Belarusian Premier League	17	2	2	0	—		—		19	2
Career total			84	6	7	0	—		—		91	6
