= Mitar Ćuković =

Montenegrin footballer (born 1995)

Personal information
- Date of birth: 6 April 1995 (age 31)
- Place of birth: Herceg Novi, FR Yugoslavia
- Height: 1.77 m (5 ft 10 in)
- Position: Left back

Team information
- Current team: Arsenal Tivat
- Number: 2

Senior career*
Years	Team	Apps	(Gls)
2013–2015	Igalo		
2015–2016	Petrovac	7	(0)
2016–2017	Lovćen	23	(0)
2017–2019	Proleter Novi Sad	45	(0)
2019–2022	Napredak Kruševac	55	(2)
2022	Panevėžys	24	(1)
2023	Velež Mostar	9	(0)
2023	Riteriai	14	(1)
2024	Shakhter Karagandy	6	(0)
2024–2025	Jezero	29	(2)
2025–	Arsenal Tivat	26	(0)
- * Club domestic league appearances and goals as of 1 June 2025

Mitar Ćuković (Montenegrin: Митар Ћуковић; born 6 April 1995) is a Montenegrin professional footballer who plays for Arsenal Tivat.

== Career ==
=== Napredak Kruševac ===
In July 2019, Ćuković joined Serbian SuperLiga club Napredak Kruševac.

=== FK Panevėžys ===
In February 2022 he signed a two-year contract with the Lithuanian club FK Panevėžys.

On 6 March 2022 he made his debut in A Lyga against "Riteriai" Club.

On 9 April 2022 he scored a goal against "Jonava" Club.

On 28 December 2022 was announced about broken contract.

=== FK Riteriai ===
On 14 July 2023 he signed with "Riteriai" Club.

On 16 July 2023 he made his debut in A lyga against "Dainava" Club.

On 13 August he scored a goal in A Lyga against FK Kauno Žalgiris.

On 16 November 2023 was announced, that player left Riteriai Club.

== Honours ==
Proleter Novi Sad

- Serbian First League: 2017–18
