= Maksym Drachenko =

Ukrainian footballer (born 1990)

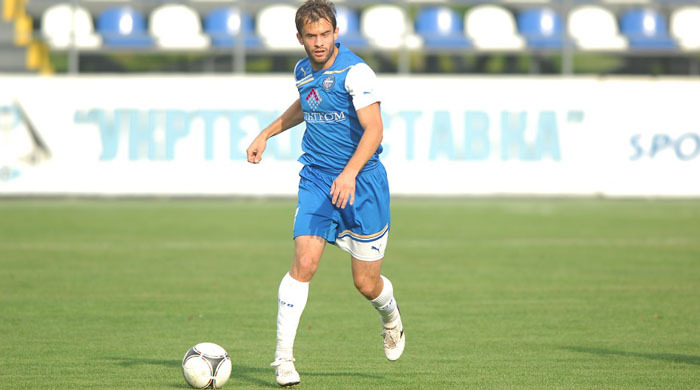

Personal information
- Full name: Maksym Olehovych Drachenko
- Date of birth: 28 January 1990 (age 36)
- Place of birth: Cherkasy, Ukrainian SSR
- Height: 1.81 m (5 ft 11 1/2 in)
- Position: Midfielder

Team information
- Current team: Shakhter Karagandy
- Number: 7

Youth career
- 2003–2006: Slavutych Cherkasy
- 2006–2007: Shakhtar Donetsk

Senior career*
| Years | Team | Apps | (Gls) |
| 2007–2010 | Shakhtar Donetsk | 0 | (0) |
| 2007–2010 | → Shakhtar-3 Donetsk | 65 | (1) |
| 2010–2016 | Olimpik Donetsk | 126 | (9) |
| 2017–2018 | Zirka Kropyvnytskyi | 39 | (2) |
| 2018–2021 | Kyzylzhar | 54 | (5) |
| 2022–2023 | Okzhetpes | 51 | (7) |
| 2024– | Shakhter Karagandy | 6 | (0) |
- * Club domestic league appearances and goals as of 16 November 2024

Maksym Drachenko (Ukrainian: Максим Олегович Драченко; born 28 January 1990) is a professional Ukrainian football midfielder who plays for Kazakhstan Premier League club Shakhter Karagandy.

He is a product of the FC Slavutych Cherkasy and FC Shakhtar Donetsk sportive schools. Drachenko's first trainer was Serhiy Kovalevych. After some seasons in the Ukrainian Second League club FC Shakhtar-3 Donetsk, he signed a contract with FC Olimpik in the Ukrainian First League. Maksym is married with one daughter.
