= Dmitry Lisakovich =

Belarusian footballer

Personal information
- Date of birth: 10 October 1999 (age 27)
- Place of birth: Uzda, Minsk Oblast, Belarus
- Position: Midfielder

Team information
- Current team: Dnepr Mogilev
- Number: 11

Youth career
- 2015–2016: Shakhtyor Soligorsk

Senior career*
Years	Team	Apps	(Gls)
2015	Uzda	26	(2)
2017	Krumkachy Minsk	7	(0)
2018	Uzda	12	(3)
2018–2019	Torpedo Minsk	6	(1)
2019–2021	Stalitsa Minsk (futsal)		
2021–2022	Isloch Minsk Raion	45	(2)
2023–2024	Torpedo-BelAZ Zhodino	33	(2)
2024	Shakhter Karagandy	11	(1)
2025	Minsk	15	(4)
2025	Dynamo Brest	8	(0)
2026	Gomel	16	(1)
2026–	Dnepr Mogilev	3	(0)
- * Club domestic league appearances and goals as of 6 September 2026

Dmitry Lisakovich (Belarusian: Дзмітрый Лісаковіч; Russian: Дмитрий Лисакович; born 10 October 1999) is a Belarusian professional footballer who plays for Dnepr Mogilev.

His brothers Vitaly Lisakovich and Ruslan Lisakovich are also professional footballers.
