= Yevgeni Kozlov =

Russian footballer (born 1995)

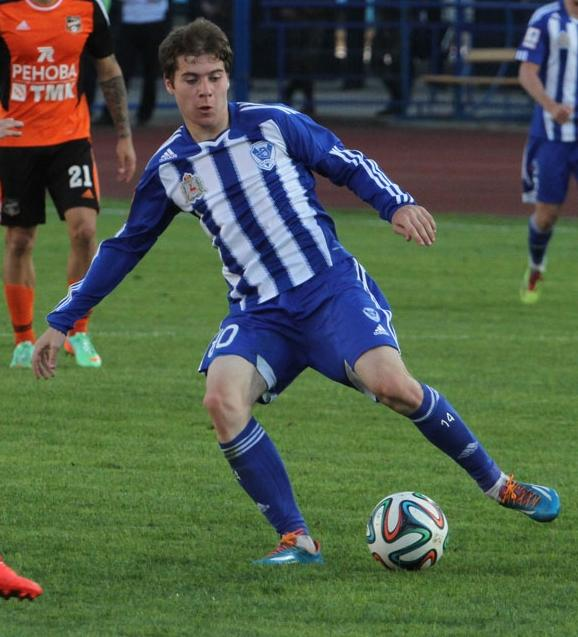
- Kozlov with Volga in 2014

Personal information
- Full name: Yevgeni Yevgenyevich Kozlov
- Date of birth: 4 February 1995 (age 31)
- Place of birth: Sergiyev Posad, Moscow Oblast, Russia
- Height: 1.73 m (5 ft 8 in)
- Position: Midfielder

Team information
- Current team: Abdysh-Ata

Youth career
- 2012–2013: Vityaz Podolsk

Senior career*
| Years | Team | Apps | (Gls) |
| 2012–2013 | Vityaz Podolsk | 30 | (4) |
| 2013 | → Rubin Kazan (loan) | 0 | (0) |
| 2014 | Volga Nizhny Novgorod | 1 | (0) |
| 2014–2015 | Zenit Saint Petersburg | 0 | (0) |
| 2014–2015 | → Zenit-2 Saint Petersburg | 13 | (0) |
| 2015 | → Dynamo Saint Petersburg (loan) | 13 | (0) |
| 2016–2017 | Spartaks Jūrmala | 50 | (15) |
| 2018–2019 | Shakhtyor Soligorsk | 6 | (0) |
| 2020–2021 | Ventspils | 26 | (11) |
| 2021 | Akzhayik | 22 | (3) |
| 2022 | Kyzylzhar | 22 | (1) |
| 2023 | Atyrau | 26 | (8) |
| 2024 | Mohammedan | 10 | (1) |
| 2024 | Shakhter Karagandy | 12 | (1) |
| 2025 | Atyrau | 8 | (0) |
| 2025– | Abdysh-Ata | 0 | (0) |

International career^{‡}
| 2015 | Russia U21 | 5 | (1) |
- * Club domestic league appearances and goals as of 14 August 2025 ‡ National team caps and goals as of 25 January 2015

Yevgeni Yevgenyevich Kozlov (Russian: Евгений Евгеньевич Козлов; born 4 February 1995) is a Russian professional footballer who plays as a midfielder for Abdysh-Ata.

== Career ==
He made his debut in the Russian Second Division for FC Vityaz Podolsk on 16 July 2012 in a game against FC Fakel Voronezh.

He made his Russian Premier League debut for FC Volga Nizhny Novgorod on 15 May 2014 in a game against FC Ural Sverdlovsk Oblast.

On 16 January 2024, Indian Super League club Mohammedan Sporting announced the signing of Kozlov.

== Honours ==
Spartaks Jūrmala

- Latvian Higher League: 2016, 2017

Mohammedan

- I-League: 2023–24

Individual

- Latvian Higher League top scorer: 2017
