= Geoffrey Chinedu =

Nigerian footballer

Personal information
- Full name: Geoffrey Charles Chinedu
- Date of birth: 1 October 1997 (age 29)
- Place of birth: Lagos, Nigeria
- Height: 1.95 m (6 ft 5 in)
- Position: Forward

Team information
- Current team: AEL Limassol (on loan from Krylia Sovetov)
- Number: 99

Youth career
- 2016: Al-Nasr
- 2016: Skënderbeu Korçë
- 2016: → Teplice (loan)

Senior career*
Years	Team	Apps	(Gls)
2015	Doğan Türk Birliği	13	(5)
2016–2017	Skënderbeu Korçë	0	(0)
2017	→ Besa (loan)	7	(1)
2017–2019	→ Rabotnički (loan)	58	(12)
2019	Turris Turnu Măgurele	0	(0)
2019–2021	Olimpik Donetsk	11	(0)
2020	→ Narva Trans (loan)	29	(7)
2021	→ Lahti (loan)	27	(7)
2022	Lahti	25	(4)
2023–2024	Radnički Kragujevac	28	(8)
2024	Liaoning Tieren	12	(1)
2024–2026	Astana	36	(18)
2026–	Krylia Sovetov	7	(2)
2026–	→ AEL Limassol (loan)	5	(1)
- * Club domestic league appearances and goals as of 7 November 2026

Geoffrey Charles Chinedu (born 1 October 1997) is a Nigerian footballer who plays as a forward for Cypriot First Division club AEL Limassol, on loan from Russian Premier League club Krylia Sovetov.

== Career ==
In 2015, Chinedu signed for Northern Cypriot side Doğan Türk Birliği, before joining the youth academy of KF Skënderbeu in the Albanian top flight. In October 2016, he also went on a trial at Czech club FK Teplice.

Before the second half of 2016/17, he was sent on loan to Albanian second division club Besa, where he made 7 league appearances and scored 1 goal.

In 2017, Chinedu signed for Rabotnički in North Macedonia.

In 2019, he signed for Romanian second division team Turris Turnu Măgurele. After that, he signed for Olimpik (Donetsk) in Ukraine.

Before the 2020 season, Chinedu was sent on loan to Estonian outfit Narva Trans before leaving that December.

In 2021, Chinedu was sent on loan to Finnish Veikkausliiga club Lahti with an option to buy. After the season, he joined Lahti on a permanent deal.

Chinedu signed a contract with Serbian Superliga club Radnički Kragujevac on 31 December 2022.

On 30 January 2024, Chinedu joined China League One club Liaoning Shenyang Urban.

On 3 July 2024, Astana announced the signing of Chinedu from Liaoning Tieren on a contract until the end of the 2026 season.

On 30 January 2026, Russian Premier League club Krylia Sovetov announced the signing of Chinedu from Astana on a contract until the end of 2027.

On 9 September 2026, Chinedu joined Cypriot First Division club AEL Limassol on a season-long loan.

== Career statistics ==
As of match played 2 September 2026

Appearances and goals by club, season and competition
Club	Season	League			Cup (Note: Includes Cypriot Cup (Northern Cyprus), Macedonian Cup, Ukrainian Cup, Estonian Cup, Suomen Cup and Serbian Cup)		League cup (Note: Includes Finnish League Cup and Kazakhstan League Cup)		Europe		Total	
Club	Season	Division	Apps	Goals	Apps	Goals	Apps	Goals	Apps	Goals	Apps	Goals
Doğan Türk Birliği	2015–16	KTFF Süper Lig	13	5	1	2	–		–		14	7
Skënderbeu Korçë	2016–17	Kategoria Superiore	0	0	0	0	–		–		0	0
Besa (loan)	2016–17	Kategoria e Parë	7	1	0	0	–		–		7	1
Rabotnički (loan)	2017–18	Macedonian First League	28	11	0	0	–		–		28	11
Rabotnički (loan)	2018–19	Macedonian First League	30	1	2	0	–		2 (Note: Appearances in UEFA Europa League)	0	34	1
Rabotnički (loan)	Total		58	12	2	0	0	0	2	0	62	14
Turris Turnu Măgurele	2019–20	Liga II	0	0	0	0	–		–		0	0
Olimpik Donetsk	2019–20	Ukrainian Premier League	11	0	2	1	–		–		13	1
Narva Trans (loan)	2020	Meistriliiga	29	7	7	8	–		–		36	15
Lahti (loan)	2021	Veikkausliiga	27	7	0	0	–		–		27	7
Lahti	2022	Veikkausliiga	25	4	6	7	3	1	–		34	12
Radnički Kragujevac	2022–23	Serbian SuperLiga	10	2	–		–		–		10	2
Radnički Kragujevac	2023–24	Serbian SuperLiga	18	6	2	1	–		–		20	7
Radnički Kragujevac	Total		28	8	2	1	0	0	0	0	30	9
Liaoning Tieren	2024	China League One	12	1	–		–		–		12	1
Astana	2024	Kazakhstan Premier League	10	7	0	0	3	3	10 (Note: Appearances in UEFA Conference League)	5	23	15
Astana	2025	Kazakhstan Premier League	26	11	1	0	0	0	4	1	31	12
Astana	Total		36	18	1	0	3	3	14	6	54	27
Krylia Sovetov	2025–26	Russian Premier League	5	2	2	0	–		–		7	2
Krylia Sovetov	2026–27	Russian Premier League	2	0	3	1	–		–		5	1
Krylia Sovetov	Total		7	2	5	1	0	0	0	0	12	3
Career total			253	65	26	20	6	4	16	6	301	95
