= 2020 FC Irtysh Pavlodar season =

FC Irtysh Pavlodar
2020 season
- Chairman: Roman Skljar
- Manager: Samvel Babayan
- Stadium: Central Stadium
- Premier League: Withdrawn
- Kazakhstan Cup: Withdrawn
- Top goalscorer: League: Carlos Fonseca (1); All: Carlos Fonseca (1)
Home colours	Away colours

The 2020 FC Irtysh Pavlodar season was the 29th successive season that the club will play in the Kazakhstan Premier League, the highest tier of association football in Kazakhstan.

== Season events ==
On 13 March, the Football Federation of Kazakhstan announced all league fixtures would be played behind closed doors for the foreseeable future due to the COVID-19 pandemic. On 16 March the Football Federation of Kazakhstan suspended all football until 15 April.

On 30 May, the Professional Football League of Kazakhstan announced that Irtysh Pavlodar had withdrawn from the league due to financial issues, with all their matches being excluded from the league results.

== Squad ==
As of match played 14 March 2020

No.	Name	Nationality	Position	Date of birth (age)	Signed from	Signed in	Contract ends	Apps.	Goals
Goalkeepers
Defenders
Midfielders
Forwards
Players away on loan
Left during the season
1	Aleksandr Zarutskiy	(Kazakhstan)	GK	26 August 1993 (aged 26)	Atyrau	2019		7	0
2	Rafkat Aslan	(Kazakhstan)	DF	2 February 1994 (aged 26)	Atyrau	2018	2020	29	1
5	Danil Kuznetsov	(Kazakhstan)	DF	11 December 1999 (aged 20)	Aksu	2020		0	0
6	Marko Tomić	(Serbia)	DF	28 October 1991 (aged 28)	Žalgiris	2020		2	0
7	Ruslan Mingazow	(Turkmenistan)	MF	23 November 1991 (aged 28)	Slavia Prague	2019		13	2
8	Artem Popov	(Kazakhstan)	MF	17 January 1998 (aged 22)	Academy	2015		39	0
9	Maksim Zhitnev	(Russia)	MF	5 May 1990 (aged 30)	Tom Tomsk	2020		2	0
10	Levan Kutalia	(Georgia (country))	FW	19 July 1989 (aged 30)	Dinamo Tbilisi	2020		2	0
12	Syarhey Chernik	(Belarus)	GK	20 July 1988 (aged 31)	BATE Borisov	2020		2	0
15	Dmitry Shmidt	(Kazakhstan)	DF	17 November 1993 (aged 26)	Akzhayik	2018		71	0
16	Serikbol Kapanov	(Kazakhstan)	GK	24 May 1996 (aged 24)	Ekibastuz	2020		0	0
17	Pablo Podio	(Argentina)	MF	7 August 1989 (aged 30)	Fastav Zlín	2020		2	0
18	Bojan Sanković	(Montenegro)	MF	21 November 1993 (aged 26)	Újpest	2020		2	0
19	Arman Kenesov	(Kazakhstan)	MF	4 September 2000 (aged 19)	Academy	2018		14	1
21	Izat Kulzhanov	(Kazakhstan)	MF	18 July 2001 (aged 18)	Academy	2020		0	0
23	Timur Baizhanov	(Kazakhstan)	MF	30 March 1990 (aged 30)	Okzhetpes	2020		2	0
25	Ruslan Yesimov	(Kazakhstan)	DF	28 April 1990 (aged 30)	Caspiy	2015		120	2
26	Miloš Stamenković	(Serbia)	DF	1 June 1990 (aged 29)	Union Saint-Gilloise	2019		65	6
40	Carlos Fonseca	(Portugal)	MF	23 August 1987 (aged 32)	Slavia Sofia	2016		143	23
44	Grigori Sartakov	(Kazakhstan)	DF	19 August 1994 (aged 25)	Tobol	2020		64	1
47	Arman Nusip	(Kazakhstan)	MF	22 January 1994 (aged 26)	Atyrau	2019	2020	22	0
77	Kristijan Dobras	(Austria)	MF	9 October 1992 (aged 27)	Melbourne Victory	2020		0	0
90	Andrei Khripkov	(Russia)	DF	30 June 1990 (aged 29)	Mordovia Saransk	2020		2	0
92	Valeri Pochivalin	(Russia)	DF	11 April 1992 (aged 28)	Khimki	2020		1	0

== Transfers ==
=== In ===
Date	Position	Nationality	Name	From	Fee	Ref.
Winter 2020	GK	(Kazakhstan)	Serikbol Kapanov	Ekibastuz	Undisclosed	
Winter 2020	DF	(Kazakhstan)	Grigori Sartakov	Tobol	Undisclosed	
Winter 2020	DF	(Russia)	Andrei Khripkov	Mordovia Saransk	Undisclosed	
Winter 2020	DF	(Russia)	Valeri Pochivalin	Khimki	Undisclosed	
Winter 2020	MF	(Austria)	Kristijan Dobras	Melbourne Victory	Undisclosed	
11 January 2020	GK	(Belarus)	Syarhey Chernik	BATE Borisov	Undisclosed	
11 January 2020	MF	(Argentina)	Pablo Podio	Fastav Zlín	Undisclosed	
11 January 2020	MF	(Montenegro)	Bojan Sanković	Újpest	Undisclosed	
11 January 2020	FW	(Georgia (country))	Levan Kutalia	Dinamo Tbilisi	Undisclosed	
15 January 2020	DF	(Serbia)	Marko Tomić	Žalgiris	Undisclosed	
28 January 2020	MF	(Kazakhstan)	Timur Baizhanov	Okzhetpes	Undisclosed	
29 January 2020	FW	(Russia)	Maksim Zhitnev	Tom Tomsk	Undisclosed	

=== Released ===
Date	Position	Nationality	Name	Joined	Date	Ref.
30 June 2020	GK	(Belarus)	Syarhey Chernik	Gorodeya		
30 June 2020	GK	(Kazakhstan)	Serikbol Kapanov			
30 June 2020	GK	(Kazakhstan)	Aleksandr Zarutskiy	Kaisar		
30 June 2020	DF	(Kazakhstan)	Rafkat Aslan	Caspiy		
30 June 2020	DF	(Kazakhstan)	Danil Kuznetsov	Zimbru Chișinău		
30 June 2020	DF	(Kazakhstan)	Grigori Sartakov	Okzhetpes		
30 June 2020	DF	(Kazakhstan)	Dmitry Shmidt	Okzhetpes		
30 June 2020	DF	(Kazakhstan)	Ruslan Yesimov	Ekibastuz		
30 June 2020	DF	(Russia)	Andrei Khripkov	Sokol Saratov	1 July 2020	
30 June 2020	DF	(Russia)	Valeri Pochivalin	Rotor Volgograd	1 July 2020	
30 June 2020	DF	(Serbia)	Miloš Stamenković	Rukh Lviv		
30 June 2020	DF	(Serbia)	Marko Tomić	Alashkert		
30 June 2020	MF	(Argentina)	Pablo Podio	Kyzylzhar		
30 June 2020	MF	(Austria)	Kristijan Dobras			
30 June 2020	MF	(Kazakhstan)	Timur Baizhanov	Tyumen	21 August 2020	
30 June 2020	MF	(Kazakhstan)	Arman Kenesov	SKA-Khabarovsk	7 August 2020	
30 June 2020	MF	(Kazakhstan)	Izat Kulzhanov			
30 June 2020	MF	(Kazakhstan)	Arman Nusip	Caspiy		
30 June 2020	MF	(Kazakhstan)	Artem Popov	Aksu		
30 June 2020	MF	(Montenegro)	Bojan Sanković	Zalaegerszegi	1 July 2020	
30 June 2020	MF	(Portugal)	Carlos Fonseca	Tobol	8 July 2020	
30 June 2020	MF	(Turkmenistan)	Ruslan Mingazow	Shakhter Karagandy		
30 June 2020	FW	(Georgia (country))	Levan Kutalia	Hapoel Tel Aviv		
30 June 2020	FW	(Russia)	Maksim Zhitnev	Novosibirsk		

== Competitions ==
=== Premier League ===
==== Results summary ====
Overall								Home						Away					
Pld	W	D	L	GF	GA	GD	Pts	W	D	L	GF	GA	GD	W	D	L	GF	GA	GD
2	0	1	1	1	2	−1	1	0	1	0	1	1	0	0	0	1	0	1	−1

Last updated: 14 March 2020.
Source: See Results

==== Results by round ====
Round	1	2
Ground	A	H
Result	L	D
Position	8	9

Source: See Results
A = Away; H = Home; W = Win; D = Draw; L = Loss

==== Results ====
8 March 2020 1	Kaisar	1 – 0	Irtysh Pavlodar	Kyzylorda
17:00 (UTC+6)	Lobjanidze 11'; Tagybergen (yellow card) 42'; Narzildaev (yellow card) 52'; Reginaldo (yellow card) 53'; Marochkin (yellow card) 84'	Report		Stadium: Gani Muratbayev Stadium; Attendance: 2,500; Referee: Artyom Kuchin

14 March 2020 2	Irtysh Pavlodar	1 – 1	Kyzylzhar	Pavlodar
15:00 (UTC+6)	Fonseca 42' (yellow card) 79'; Khripkov (yellow card) 55'; L.Kutalia (yellow card) 64'; R.Yesimov (yellow card) 73'; Tomić (yellow card) 90+1'; Baizhanov (yellow card) 90+3'	Report	A.Sokolenko 15'; Ceesay (yellow card) 76'; Markelov (yellow card) 78'	Stadium: Central Stadium; Attendance: 0 Referee: Timur Kumashev
Note: Match played behind closed doors due to the COVID-19 pandemic.

==== League table ====
Pos	Team	Pld	W	D	L	GF	GA	GD	Pts	Qualification or relegation
8	Taraz	20	5	8	7	19	23	−4	23	
9	Kyzylzhar	20	6	5	9	15	24	−9	23	
10	Caspiy	20	5	2	13	15	34	−19	17	
11	Okzhetpes (R)	20	2	5	13	16	38	−22	11	Relegation to the Kazakhstan First Division
12	Irtysh Pavlodar (D, R)	0	0	0	0	0	0	0	0	Withdrawn, relegated to the Kazakhstan First Division

Source: UEFA, Soccerway
Rules for classification: 1) Points; 2) Goal difference; 3) Matches won; 4) Goals scored; 5) Away goals scored; 6) Head-to-head points; 7) Head-to-head matches won; 8) Head-to-head goal difference; 9) Head-to-head goals scored; 10) Head-to-head away goals scored; 11) Draw.
(D) Disqualified; (R) Relegated

=== Kazakhstan Cup ===
July 2020 Last 16	–
(UTC+6)

== Squad statistics ==
As of match played 14 March 2020

=== Appearances and goals ===
No.	Pos	Nat	Player	Total		Premier League		Kazakhstan Cup	
No.	Pos	Nat	Player	Apps	Goals	Apps	Goals	Apps	Goals
Players away from Irtysh Pavlodar on loan:
Players who left Irtysh Pavlodar during the season:
6	DF	(Serbia) SRB	Marko Tomić	2	0	1+1	0	0	0
7	MF	(Turkmenistan) TKM	Ruslan Mingazow	2	0	2	0	0	0
8	MF	(Kazakhstan) KAZ	Artem Popov	1	0	1	0	0	0
9	FW	(Russia) RUS	Maksim Zhitnev	2	0	1+1	0	0	0
10	FW	(Georgia (country)) GEO	Levan Kutalia	2	0	1+1	0	0	0
12	GK	(Belarus) BLR	Syarhey Chernik	2	0	2	0	0	0
15	DF	(Kazakhstan) KAZ	Dmitry Shmidt	2	0	2	0	0	0
17	MF	(Argentina) ARG	Pablo Podio	2	0	2	0	0	0
18	MF	(Montenegro) MNE	Bojan Sanković	2	0	2	0	0	0
23	MF	(Kazakhstan) KAZ	Timur Baizhanov	2	0	0+2	0	0	0
25	DF	(Kazakhstan) KAZ	Ruslan Yesimov	1	0	1	0	0	0
26	DF	(Serbia) SRB	Miloš Stamenković	2	0	2	0	0	0
40	MF	(Portugal) POR	Carlos Fonseca	2	1	2	1	0	0
90	DF	(Russia) RUS	Andrei Khripkov	2	0	2	0	0	0
92	DF	(Russia) RUS	Valeri Pochivalin	1	0	1	0	0	0

=== Goal scorers ===
Place	Position	Nation	Number	Name	Premier League	Kazakhstan Cup	Total
1	MF	(Portugal)	40	Carlos Fonseca	1	0	1
				TOTALS	1	0	1

=== Disciplinary record ===
Number	Nation	Position	Name	Premier League		Kazakhstan Cup		Total	
Number	Nation	Position	Name	Booked	Sent off (straight red)	Booked	Sent off (straight red)	Booked	Sent off (straight red)
Players who left Irtysh Pavlodar during the season:
6	(Serbia)	DF	Marko Tomić	1	0	0	0	1	0
10	(Georgia (country))	FW	Levan Kutalia	1	0	0	0	1	0
23	(Kazakhstan)	FW	Timur Baizhanov	1	0	0	0	1	0
25	(Kazakhstan)	DF	Ruslan Yesimov	1	0	0	0	1	0
40	(Portugal)	MF	Carlos Fonseca	1	0	0	0	1	0
90	(Russia)	DF	Andrei Khripkov	1	0	0	0	1	0
			TOTALS	6	0	0	0	6	0
