= List of Kazakhstan football transfers summer 2020 =

This is a list of Kazakh football transfers in the summer transfer window 2020 by club, running from 20 July to 9 August. Only clubs of the 2020 Kazakhstan Premier League are included.

== Kazakhstan Premier League 2020 ==
=== Astana ===
In: Note: Flags indicate national team as defined under FIFA eligibility rules; some limited exceptions apply. Players may hold more than one non-FIFA nationality.

| No. | Pos. | Nation | Player |
|---|---|---|---|
| 4 | DF | SRB | Uroš Radaković (on loan from (Czech Republic) Sparta Prague) |
| 70 | MF | KAZ | Sultan Sagnayev (loan return from (Kazakhstan) Caspiy) |
| 81 | FW | KAZ | Ramazan Karimov (loan return from (Kazakhstan) Caspiy) |

Out: Note: Flags indicate national team as defined under FIFA eligibility rules; some limited exceptions apply. Players may hold more than one non-FIFA nationality.

| No. | Pos. | Nation | Player |
|---|---|---|---|
| 19 | FW | COD | Ndombe Mubele (loan return to (France) Toulouse) |
| 25 | DF | KAZ | Serhiy Malyi (to (Kazakhstan) Tobol) |
| 32 | FW | CUW | Rangelo Janga (loan to (Netherlands) NEC Nijmegen, previously on loan to (Switzerland) Lugano) |

=== Caspiy ===
In: Note: Flags indicate national team as defined under FIFA eligibility rules; some limited exceptions apply. Players may hold more than one non-FIFA nationality.

| No. | Pos. | Nation | Player |
|---|---|---|---|
| 3 | DF | KAZ | Rafkat Aslan (from (Kazakhstan) Irtysh Pavlodar) |
| 11 | MF | KAZ | Yerkebulan Nurgaliyev (from (Kazakhstan) Shakhter Karagandy) |
| 47 | MF | KAZ | Arman Nusip (from (Kazakhstan) Irtysh Pavlodar) |
| 97 | FW | CRO | Branko Čubrilo |
| — | MF | KAZ | Kirill Shestakov |

Out: Note: Flags indicate national team as defined under FIFA eligibility rules; some limited exceptions apply. Players may hold more than one non-FIFA nationality.

| No. | Pos. | Nation | Player |
|---|---|---|---|
| 3 | DF | SRB | Bojan Kovačević (loan return to (Serbia) Proleter Novi Sad) |
| 9 | FW | KAZ | Aydos Tattybaev (to (Kazakhstan) Shakhter Karagandy) |
| 11 | MF | SRB | Aleksandar Stanisavljević (to (Kazakhstan) Kaisar) |
| 14 | DF | UKR | Taras Bondarenko (to (Kazakhstan) Okzhetpes) |
| 20 | DF | KAZ | Karam Sultanov (to (Azerbaijan) Sumgayit) |
| 26 | MF | KAZ | Yerkin Tapalov (to (Kazakhstan) Shakhter Karagandy) |
| 44 | FW | TOG | Serge Nyuiadzi (to (Kazakhstan) Taraz) |
| 70 | MF | KAZ | Sultan Sagnayev (loan return to (Kazakhstan) Astana) |
| 81 | FW | KAZ | Ramazan Karimov (loan return to (Kazakhstan) Astana) |

=== Irtysh Pavlodar ===
In: Note: Flags indicate national team as defined under FIFA eligibility rules; some limited exceptions apply. Players may hold more than one non-FIFA nationality.

| No. | Pos. | Nation | Player |

Out: Note: Flags indicate national team as defined under FIFA eligibility rules; some limited exceptions apply. Players may hold more than one non-FIFA nationality.

| No. | Pos. | Nation | Player |
|---|---|---|---|
| 1 | GK | KAZ | Aleksandr Zarutskiy |
| 2 | DF | KAZ | Rafkat Aslan (to (Kazakhstan) Caspiy) |
| 5 | DF | KAZ | Danil Kuznetsov |
| 6 | DF | SRB | Marko Tomić |
| 7 | MF | TKM | Ruslan Mingazow (to (Kazakhstan) Shakhter Karagandy) |
| 8 | MF | KAZ | Artem Popov |
| 9 | FW | RUS | Maksim Zhitnev (to (Russia) Novosibirsk) |
| 10 | FW | GEO | Levan Kutalia (to (Georgia (country)) Hapoel Tel Aviv) |
| 12 | GK | BLR | Syarhey Chernik |
| 15 | DF | KAZ | Dmitry Shmidt (to (Kazakhstan) Okzhetpes) |
| 16 | GK | KAZ | Serikbol Kapanov |
| 17 | MF | ARG | Pablo Podio (to (Kazakhstan) Kyzylzhar) |
| 18 | MF | MNE | Bojan Sanković (to (Hungary) Zalaegerszegi) |
| 19 | MF | KAZ | Arman Kenesov (to (Russia) SKA-Khabarovsk) |
| 21 | MF | KAZ | Izat Kulzhanov |
| 23 | MF | KAZ | Timur Baizhanov |
| 25 | DF | KAZ | Ruslan Yesimov |
| 26 | DF | SRB | Miloš Stamenković |
| 40 | MF | POR | Carlos Fonseca (to (Kazakhstan) Tobol) |
| 44 | DF | KAZ | Grigori Sartakov |
| 47 | MF | KAZ | Arman Nusip (to (Kazakhstan) Caspiy) |
| 77 | MF | AUT | Kristijan Dobras |
| 90 | DF | RUS | Andrei Khripkov (to (Russia) Sokol Saratov) |
| 92 | DF | RUS | Valeri Pochivalin (to (Russia) Rotor Volgograd) |

=== Kairat ===
In: Note: Flags indicate national team as defined under FIFA eligibility rules; some limited exceptions apply. Players may hold more than one non-FIFA nationality.

| No. | Pos. | Nation | Player |
|---|---|---|---|
| 9 | FW | BRA | Vágner Love (from (Brazil) Corinthians) |

Out: Note: Flags indicate national team as defined under FIFA eligibility rules; some limited exceptions apply. Players may hold more than one non-FIFA nationality.

| No. | Pos. | Nation | Player |
|---|---|---|---|
| 10 | FW | KAZ | Yerkebulan Seydakhmet (on loan to (Kazakhstan) Zhetysu) |
| 25 | MF | RUS | Kirill Kolesnichenko (on loan to (Russia) Rotor Volgograd) |

=== Kaisar ===
In: Note: Flags indicate national team as defined under FIFA eligibility rules; some limited exceptions apply. Players may hold more than one non-FIFA nationality.

| No. | Pos. | Nation | Player |
|---|---|---|---|
| 1 | GK | KAZ | Aleksandr Zarutskiy (from (Kazakhstan) Irtysh Pavlodar) |
| 15 | FW | KAZ | Elzhas Altynbekov (from (Kazakhstan) Zhetysu) |
| 39 | MF | SRB | Aleksandar Stanisavljević (from (Kazakhstan) Caspiy) |
| — | DF | KAZ | Timur Rudoselskiy |

Out: Note: Flags indicate national team as defined under FIFA eligibility rules; some limited exceptions apply. Players may hold more than one non-FIFA nationality.

| No. | Pos. | Nation | Player |
|---|---|---|---|
| 1 | GK | KAZ | Aleksandr Grigorenko |
| 39 | DF | RUS | Aleksei Shumskikh (to (Russia) Nizhny Novgorod) |
| 92 | MF | CRO | Ivan Pešić (to (Ukraine) Vorskla Poltava) |
| — | DF | KAZ | Timur Rudoselskiy (to (Armenia) Lori) |

=== Kyzylzhar ===
In: Note: Flags indicate national team as defined under FIFA eligibility rules; some limited exceptions apply. Players may hold more than one non-FIFA nationality.

| No. | Pos. | Nation | Player |
|---|---|---|---|
| 5 | MF | ARG | Pablo Podio (from (Kazakhstan) Irtysh Pavlodar) |

Out: Note: Flags indicate national team as defined under FIFA eligibility rules; some limited exceptions apply. Players may hold more than one non-FIFA nationality.

| No. | Pos. | Nation | Player |
|---|---|---|---|
| 2 | DF | BLR | Terentiy Lutsevich |
| 3 | DF | KAZ | Bakdaulet Kozhabaev |
| 5 | DF | GEO | Tamaz Tsetskhladze |

=== Okzhetpes ===
In: Note: Flags indicate national team as defined under FIFA eligibility rules; some limited exceptions apply. Players may hold more than one non-FIFA nationality.

| No. | Pos. | Nation | Player |
|---|---|---|---|
| 7 | DF | NGA | Aliyu Abubakar (from (Kazakhstan) Shakhter Karagandy) |
| 14 | DF | UKR | Taras Bondarenko (from (Kazakhstan) Caspiy) |
| 15 | DF | KAZ | Dmitry Shmidt (from (Kazakhstan) Irtysh Pavlodar) |
| — | DF | KAZ | Ulanbek Kuanyshbekov (from (Armenia) Torpedo Yerevan) |
| — | DF | KAZ | Grigori Sartakov (from (Kazakhstan) Irtysh Pavlodar) |

Out: Note: Flags indicate national team as defined under FIFA eligibility rules; some limited exceptions apply. Players may hold more than one non-FIFA nationality.

| No. | Pos. | Nation | Player |
|---|---|---|---|
| 15 | DF | KAZ | Niyaz Idrisov |
| 22 | DF | UKR | Andriy Mischenko |

=== Ordabasy ===
In: Note: Flags indicate national team as defined under FIFA eligibility rules; some limited exceptions apply. Players may hold more than one non-FIFA nationality.

| No. | Pos. | Nation | Player |

Out: Note: Flags indicate national team as defined under FIFA eligibility rules; some limited exceptions apply. Players may hold more than one non-FIFA nationality.

| No. | Pos. | Nation | Player |
|---|---|---|---|
| 19 | DF | KAZ | Marat Bystrov (to (Russia) Akhmat Grozny) |

=== Shakhter Karagandy ===
In: Note: Flags indicate national team as defined under FIFA eligibility rules; some limited exceptions apply. Players may hold more than one non-FIFA nationality.

| No. | Pos. | Nation | Player |
|---|---|---|---|
| 5 | DF | RUS | Soslan Takulov (from (Belarus) Slutsk) |
| 10 | FW | KAZ | Aydos Tattybaev (from (Kazakhstan) Caspiy) |
| 20 | MF | TKM | Ruslan Mingazow (from (Kazakhstan) Irtysh Pavlodar) |
| 26 | MF | KAZ | Yerkin Tapalov (from (Kazakhstan) Caspiy) |

Out: Note: Flags indicate national team as defined under FIFA eligibility rules; some limited exceptions apply. Players may hold more than one non-FIFA nationality.

| No. | Pos. | Nation | Player |
|---|---|---|---|
| 5 | DF | KAZ | Aleksandr Kislitsyn |
| 6 | DF | NGA | Aliyu Abubakar (to (Kazakhstan) Okzhetpes) |
| 7 | MF | FRA | Jérémy Manzorro (to (Kazakhstan) Tobol) |
| 9 | FW | KAZ | Bauyrzhan Turysbek (to (Kazakhstan) Taraz) |
| 10 | FW | KAZ | Yerkebulan Nurgaliyev (to (Kazakhstan) Caspiy) |

=== Taraz ===
In: Note: Flags indicate national team as defined under FIFA eligibility rules; some limited exceptions apply. Players may hold more than one non-FIFA nationality.

| No. | Pos. | Nation | Player |
|---|---|---|---|
| 28 | FW | KAZ | Bauyrzhan Turysbek (from (Kazakhstan) Shakhter Karagandy) |
| 30 | MF | KAZ | Baūyrzhan Baytana |
| 33 | FW | TOG | Serge Nyuiadzi (from (Kazakhstan) Caspiy) |
| — | MF | COL | Roger Cañas |

Out: Note: Flags indicate national team as defined under FIFA eligibility rules; some limited exceptions apply. Players may hold more than one non-FIFA nationality.

| No. | Pos. | Nation | Player |
|---|---|---|---|
| 70 | FW | AUT | Nils Zatl |

=== Tobol ===
In: Note: Flags indicate national team as defined under FIFA eligibility rules; some limited exceptions apply. Players may hold more than one non-FIFA nationality.

| No. | Pos. | Nation | Player |
|---|---|---|---|
| 25 | DF | KAZ | Serhiy Malyi (from (Kazakhstan) Astana) |
| 69 | MF | FRA | Jérémy Manzorro (from (Kazakhstan) Shakhter Karagandy) |
| 87 | MF | POR | Carlos Fonseca (from (Kazakhstan) Irtysh Pavlodar) |

Out: Note: Flags indicate national team as defined under FIFA eligibility rules; some limited exceptions apply. Players may hold more than one non-FIFA nationality.

| No. | Pos. | Nation | Player |
|---|---|---|---|
| 6 | DF | NGA | Stephen Eze |
| 70 | MF | GEO | Luka Zarandia (loan return to (Belgium) Zulte Waregem) |

=== Zhetysu ===
In: Note: Flags indicate national team as defined under FIFA eligibility rules; some limited exceptions apply. Players may hold more than one non-FIFA nationality.

| No. | Pos. | Nation | Player |
|---|---|---|---|
| 7 | FW | KAZ | Yerkebulan Seydakhmet (on loan from (Kazakhstan) Kairat) |

Out: Note: Flags indicate national team as defined under FIFA eligibility rules; some limited exceptions apply. Players may hold more than one non-FIFA nationality.

| No. | Pos. | Nation | Player |
|---|---|---|---|
| 6 | DF | BUL | Georgi Pashov (to (Romania) Academica Clinceni) |
| 7 | FW | KAZ | Elzhas Altynbekov (to (Kazakhstan) Kaisar) |
