= 2020 FC Kyzylzhar season =

FC Kyzylzhar
2020 season
- Manager: Veaceslav Rusnac
- Stadium: Karasai Stadium
- Premier League: 9th
- Kazakhstan Cup: Canceled due to the COVID-19 pandemic
- Top goalscorer: League: Three Players (3); All: Three Players (3)
Home colours	Away colours

The 2020 FC Kyzylzhar season was Kyzylzhar's the first season back in the Kazakhstan Premier League, the highest tier of association football in Kazakhstan, following their relegation in 2018. Kyzylzhar will also take part in the Kazakhstan Cup.

== Season events ==
On 13 March, the Football Federation of Kazakhstan announced all league fixtures would be played behind closed doors for the foreseeable future due to the COVID-19 pandemic. On 16 March the Football Federation of Kazakhstan suspended all football until 15 April.

On 30 May, the Professional Football League of Kazakhstan announced that Irtysh Pavlodar had withdrawn from the league due to financial issues, with all their matches being excluded from the league results.

On 26 July, it was announced that the league would resume on 1 July, with no fans being permitted to watch the games. The league was suspended for a second time on 3 July, for an initial two weeks, due to an increase in COVID-19 cases in the country.

On 9 September, Kyzylzhar announced the signings of Ruslan Koryan, Nikita Bezlikhotnov and Artem Baranovskyi.

== Squad ==
As of match played 30 November 2020

No.	Name	Nationality	Position	Date of birth (age)	Signed from	Signed in	Contract ends	Apps.	Goals
Goalkeepers
1	Anton Tsirin	(Kazakhstan)	GK	10 August 1987 (aged 33)	Irtysh Pavlodar	2020		21	0
32	Vadim Petrov	(Kazakhstan)	GK	11 June 2000 (aged 20)	Academy	2020		2	0
33	Oleg Grubov	(Kazakhstan)	GK	4 March 1997 (aged 23)	Kairat Academy	2020		0	0
41	Miroslav Lobantsev	(Russia)	GK	27 May 1995 (aged 25)	Rotor Volgograd	2020		19	0
Defenders
3	Artem Baranovskyi	(Ukraine)	DF	17 March 1990 (aged 30)	Buxoro	2020		10	0
6	Alibek Kasym	(Kazakhstan)	DF	27 May 1998 (aged 22)	loan from Kairat Academy	2019			
15	Aleksandr Sokolenko	(Kazakhstan)	DF	25 December 2000 (aged 19)	Kairat	2020		10	1
20	Viktor Gunchenko	(Kazakhstan)	DF	25 August 1994 (aged 26)	Youth Team	2013			
23	Berik Shaikhov	(Kazakhstan)	DF	20 February 1994 (aged 26)	Shakhter Karagandy	2020		14	0
27	Vytautas Andriuškevičius	(Lithuania)	DF	8 October 1990 (aged 30)	Tobol	2020		10	0
40	Ildar Aitov	(Kazakhstan)	DF	2 March 1990 (aged 30)	Youth Team	2009			
66	Igor Gubanov	(Russia)	DF	4 February 1992 (aged 28)	Slutsk	2020		10	0
Midfielders
4	Nikita Bezlikhotnov	(Russia)	MF	19 August 1990 (aged 30)	Armavir	2020		3	0
5	Pablo Podio	(Argentina)	MF	7 August 1989 (aged 31)	Irtysh Pavlodar	2020		12	0
7	Maksym Drachenko	(Ukraine)	MF	28 January 1990 (aged 30)	Zirka Kropyvnytskyi	2018			
10	Shota Grigalashvili	(Georgia (country))	MF	21 June 1986 (aged 34)	Olmaliq	2018			
11	Artem Cheredinov	(Kazakhstan)	MF	17 July 1998 (aged 22)	Youth team	2019			
12	Moussa Koné	(Ivory Coast)	MF	12 February 1990 (aged 30)	BB Erzurumspor	2020		16	0
16	Mihai Plătică	(Moldova)	MF	15 March 1990 (aged 30)	Milsami Orhei	2020		20	0
21	Uroš Delić	(Montenegro)	MF	10 August 1987 (aged 33)	Gol Gohar Sirjan	2020			
44	Nurlan Daurenbekov	(Kazakhstan)	MF	23 September 1989 (aged 31)		2020			
77	Sergei Skorykh	(Kazakhstan)	MF	25 May 1984 (aged 36)	Shakhter Karagandy	2020		22	0
Forwards
8	Momodou Ceesay	(The Gambia)	FW	24 December 1988 (aged 31)	Irtysh Pavlodar	2019		41	11
9	Ivan Markelov	(Russia)	FW	17 April 1988 (aged 32)	Tambov	2020		18	0
14	Ruslan Koryan	(Armenia)	FW	15 June 1988 (aged 32)	Fakel Voronezh	2020		8	0
19	Timur Muldinov	(Kazakhstan)	FW	19 September 1993 (aged 27)	Irtysh Pavlodar	2020			
78	Ihar Zyankovich	(Belarus)	FW	17 September 1987 (aged 33)	Kaisar	2020		3	0
99	Maksim Skorykh	(Kazakhstan)	FW	20 April 2000 (aged 20)	Youth Team	2020		5	1
Players away on loan
Left during the season
2	Terentiy Lutsevich	(Belarus)	DF	19 April 1991 (aged 29)	Gomel	2020		0	0
3	Bakdaulet Kozhabaev	(Kazakhstan)	DF	19 June 1992 (aged 28)	Ordabasy	2018			
4	Gabriel Enache	(Romania)	MF	18 August 1990 (aged 30)	Astra Giurgiu	2020		6	2
5	Tamaz Tsetskhladze	(Georgia (country))	MF	8 December 1996 (aged 23)	Torpedo Kutaisi	2020		3	0

== Transfers ==
=== Winter ===
In: Note: Flags indicate national team as defined under FIFA eligibility rules; some limited exceptions apply. Players may hold more than one non-FIFA nationality.

No.	Pos.	Nation	Player
2	DF	BLR	Terentiy Lutsevich (from (Belarus) Gomel)
4	MF	ROU	Gabriel Enache (from (Romania) Astra Giurgiu)
5	DF	GEO	Tamaz Tsetskhladze (from (Georgia (country)) Torpedo Kutaisi)
9	FW	RUS	Ivan Markelov
12	MF	MLI	Moussa Koné
15	DF	KAZ	Aleksandr Sokolenko (from (Kazakhstan) Kairat)
16	MF	MDA	Mihai Plătică (from (Moldova) Milsami Orhei)
19	FW	KAZ	Timur Muldinov (from (Kazakhstan) Irtysh Pavlodar)
21	MF	MNE	Uroš Delić (from (Iran) Gol Gohar Sirjan)
23	DF	KAZ	Berik Shaikhov (from (Kazakhstan) Shakhter Karagandy)
27	DF	LTU	Vytautas Andriuškevičius (from (Kazakhstan) Tobol)
41	GK	RUS	Miroslav Lobantsev (from (Russia) Rotor Volgograd)
66	DF	RUS	Igor Gubanov (from (Belarus) Slutsk)
77	MF	KAZ	Sergei Skorykh (from (Kazakhstan) Shakhter Karagandy)
78	FW	BLR	Ihar Zyankovich (from (Kazakhstan) Kaisar)
—	GK	KAZ	Oleg Grubov (from (Kazakhstan) Kairat Academy)
—	DF	KAZ	Erasyl Amanzhol (loan from (Kazakhstan) Atyrau extended)
—	MF	KAZ	Vladimir Vomenko

Out: Note: Flags indicate national team as defined under FIFA eligibility rules; some limited exceptions apply. Players may hold more than one non-FIFA nationality.

No.	Pos.	Nation	Player
—	GK	KAZ	Timurbek Zakirov (to (Kazakhstan) Shakhter Karagandy, previously on loan to (Kazakhstan) Taraz)
—	GK	KAZ	Zhandar Zhangaliev (to (Kazakhstan) Makhtaaral)
—	DF	KAZ	Aldan Baltaev
—	DF	KAZ	Adil Sergaliev
—	DF	KAZ	Karam Sultanov
—	DF	KAZ	Danil Tsoy
—	MF	KAZ	Piraliy Aliev
—	MF	KAZ	Aslan Dzhanuzakov
—	MF	KAZ	Elmar Nabiev
—	MF	KAZ	Erasyl Seitkanov
—	FW	KAZ	Pavel Kriventsev (to (Kazakhstan) Shakhter Karagandy)

=== Summer ===
In: Note: Flags indicate national team as defined under FIFA eligibility rules; some limited exceptions apply. Players may hold more than one non-FIFA nationality.

No.	Pos.	Nation	Player
3	DF	UKR	Artem Baranovskyi (from (Uzbekistan) Buxoro)
4	MF	RUS	Nikita Bezlikhotnov (from (Russia) Armavir)
5	MF	ARG	Pablo Podio (from (Kazakhstan) Irtysh Pavlodar)
14	FW	ARM	Ruslan Koryan (from (Russia) Fakel Voronezh)

Out: Note: Flags indicate national team as defined under FIFA eligibility rules; some limited exceptions apply. Players may hold more than one non-FIFA nationality.

No.	Pos.	Nation	Player
2	DF	BLR	Terentiy Lutsevich (to (Belarus) Gomel)
3	DF	KAZ	Bakdaulet Kozhabaev
4	MF	ROU	Gabriel Enache
5	DF	GEO	Tamaz Tsetskhladze (to (Georgia (country)) Dila Gori)

== Friendlies ==
	–
(UTC+6)

== Competitions ==
=== Premier League ===
==== Results summary ====
Overall								Home						Away					
Pld	W	D	L	GF	GA	GD	Pts	W	D	L	GF	GA	GD	W	D	L	GF	GA	GD
20	6	5	9	15	24	−9	23	4	2	4	8	8	0	2	3	5	7	16	−9

Last updated: 30 November 2020.
Source: See Results

==== Results by round ====
Round	1	2	3	4	5	6	7	8	9	10	11	12	13	14	15	16	17	18	19	20
Ground	A	A	H	A	H	A	H	A	H	A	A	H	A	H	A	H	A	H	A	H
Result	L	P	W	D	L	L	W	L	L	L	L	W	D	W	D	L	W	D	W	L
Position	12	10	9	9	9	9	8	9	9	9	10	9	9	8	9	9	9	9	9	9

Source: See Results
A = Away; H = Home; W = Win; D = Draw; L = Loss

==== Results ====
7 March 2020 1	Astana	4 – 0	Kyzylzhar	Almaty
14:00 (UTC+6)	Sotiriou 51', 82'; Sigurjónsson 88'; Tomasov 90'	Report	B.Shaikhov (yellow card) 36'; Markelov (yellow card) 63'; V.Gunchenko (yellow card) 90'	Stadium: Zhas Kyran Stadium; Attendance: 500; Referee: Bakhyt Kyzylbaev
Note: Match played at the Zhas Kyran Stadium in Almaty, due to repair work being carried out at the Astana Arena in Nur-Sultan.

14 March 2020 2	Irtysh Pavlodar	1 – 1	Kyzylzhar	Pavlodar
15:00 (UTC+6)	Fonseca 42' (yellow card) 79'; Khripkov (yellow card) 55'; L.Kutalia (yellow card) 64'; R.Yesimov (yellow card) 73'; Tomić (yellow card) 90+1'; Baizhanov (yellow card) 90+3'	Report	A.Sokolenko 15'; Ceesay (yellow card) 76'; Markelov (yellow card) 78'	Stadium: Central Stadium; Attendance: 0 Referee: Timur Kumashev
Note: Match played behind closed doors due to the COVID-19 pandemic. Match result annulled on 30 May.

1 July 2020 3	Kyzylzhar	3 – 1	Okzhetpes	Petropavl
18:00 (UTC+6)	Drachenko (yellow card) 42'; Enache 44'; Dimov 76'; A.Sokolenko (yellow card) 81'; T.Muldinov 87'	Report	Moldakaraev 28'; Chertov (yellow card) 84'	Stadium: Karasai Stadium; Attendance: 0 Referee: Arman Ismuratov
Note: Match originally scheduled for 21 March, but postponed on 16 March due to the COVID-19 pandemic.

18 August 2020 4	Taraz	0 – 0	Kyzylzhar	Almaty
21:00 (UTC+6)	Nyuiadzi (yellow card) 76'	Report	Delić (yellow card) 60'	Stadium: Jas Qyran Stadium; Attendance: 0 Referee: Ruslan Omarov
Note: Match originally scheduled for 3 April and then 4 July, but postponed twice due to the COVID-19 pandemic. Match played at the Jas Qyran stadium in Almaty, instead of Taraz's regular Central Stadium in Taraz. Match played behind closed doors due to the COVID-19 pandemic.

22 August 2020 5	Kyzylzhar	1 – 3	Shakhter Karagandy	Almaty
21:00 (UTC+6)	Delić (yellow card) 44'; Enache 78'	Report	Buyvolov 14'; Baah (yellow card) 19'; P.Kriventsev (yellow card) 28'; Mingazow (yellow card) 51'; Y.Tapalov (yellow card) 76'; Lamanje 85'; A.Tattybaev 90+3'	Stadium: Jas Qyran Stadium; Attendance: 0 Referee: Daniyar Sakhi
Note: Match originally scheduled for 11 April and then 10 July, but postponed twice due to the COVID-19 pandemic. Match played at the Jas Qyran stadium in Almaty, instead of Kyzylzhar's regular Karasai Stadium in Petropavl. Match played behind closed doors due to the COVID-19 pandemic.

27 August 2020 6	Zhetysu	3 – 0	Kyzylzhar	Talgar
16:00 (UTC+6)	Lobantsev 5' (o.g.); Toshev 41'; Shkodra 68'	Report	Gubanov (yellow card) 53'; Delić (yellow card) 90+1'	Stadium: UTB Talgar Stadium; Attendance: 0 Referee: Artyom Kuchin
Note: Match played at the Jas Qyran Stadium in Almaty, instead of Zhetysu's regular Zhetysu Stadium in Taldıqorğan. Match played behind closed doors due to the COVID-19 pandemic.

30 August 2020 7	Kyzylzhar	1 – 0	Caspiy	Almaty
21:00 (UTC+6)	Drachenko 6' (yellow card) 70'; B.Shaikhov (yellow card) 13'; Lobantsev (yellow card) 90+4'	Report	A.Nabikhanov (yellow card) 26'; Čubrilo (yellow card) 62'; Sebaihi (yellow card) 64'; Adams (yellow card) 83'	Stadium: Jas Qyran Stadium; Attendance: 0 Referee: Askhat Abdanbayev
Note: Match played at the Jas Qyran Stadium in Almaty, instead of Kyzylzhar's regular Karasai Stadium in Petropavl. Match played behind closed doors due to the COVID-19 pandemic.

12 September 2020 8	Tobol	2 – 0	Kyzylzhar	Almaty
17:00 (UTC+6)	Muzhikov (yellow card) 24'; Miroshnichenko 35'; Nurgaliev 49'; Amanović (yellow card) 55'	Report		Stadium: Stadïon Akademïï T.S.Segïzbaeva; Attendance: 0 Referee: Saken Bayimbet
Note: Match played at the Stadïon Akademïï T.S.Segïzbaeva in Almaty, instead of Tobol's regular Central Stadium in Kostanay. Match played behind closed doors due to the COVID-19 pandemic.

21 September 2020 9	Kyzylzhar	0 – 1	Kairat	Talgar
16:00 (UTC+6)	Markelov (yellow card) 18'; Plătică (yellow card) 29'; B.Shaikhov (yellow card) 68'; Gubanov (yellow card) 74'	Report	Aimbetov 28'; Alip (yellow card) 90+3'; Kosović (yellow card) 90+4'	Stadium: UTB Talgar; Attendance: 0 Referee: Denis Izmailov
Note: Match played at the UTB Talgar stadium in Talgar, instead of Kyzylzhar's regular Karasai Stadium in Petropavl. Match played behind closed doors due to the COVID-19 pandemic.

24 September 2020 10	Ordabasy	1 – 0	Kyzylzhar	Talgar
15:45 (UTC+6)	Diakate (yellow card) 41'; João Paulo 72'	Report	A.Sokolenko (yellow card) 86'	Stadium: UTB Talgar; Attendance: 0 Referee: Daniyar Sakhi
Note: Match played at the UTB Talgar stadium in Talgar, instead of Ordabasy's regular Kazhymukan Munaitpasov Stadium in Shymkent. Match played behind closed doors due to the COVID-19 pandemic.

28 September 2020 11	Kyzylzhar	0 – 0	Kaisar	Almaty
14:00 (UTC+6)	A.Kasym (yellow card) 57'; Koné (yellow card) 90'	Report	I.Amirseitov (yellow card) 31'; Narzildaev (yellow card) 48'; Tagybergen (yellow card) 64'	Stadium: T.S.Segïzbaeva Academy Stadium; Attendance: 0 Referee: Saken Bayimbet
Note: Match played at the T.S.Segïzbaeva Academy Stadium in Almaty, instead of Kyzylzhar's regular Karasai Stadium in Petropavl. Match played behind closed doors due to the COVID-19 pandemic.

17 October 2020 13	Okzhetpes	2 – 1	Kyzylzhar	Almaty
13:00 (UTC+6)	Dmitrijev 54' (pen.); Zorić 68'	Report	T.Muldinov (yellow card) 11'; Drachenko (yellow card) 24'; Grigalashvili 43'; Koné (yellow card) 90'	Stadium: Jas Qyran Stadium; Attendance: 0 Referee: Denis Izmailov
Note: Match played at the Jas Qyran Stadium in Almaty, instead of Okzhetpes's regular Okzhetpes Stadium in Kokshetau. Match played behind closed doors due to the COVID-19 pandemic.

21 October 2020 14	Kyzylzhar	1 – 0	Taraz	Almaty
14:00 (UTC+6)	Delić (yellow card) 37'; Ceesay 68'; T.Muldinov (yellow card) 90+2'	Report	B.Aitbayev (yellow card) 22'; Nyuiadzi (yellow card) 38'; Čađenović (yellow card) 45+1'; M.Amirkhanov (yellow card) 80'; D.Babakhanov (yellow card) 90+5'	Stadium: T.S.Segïzbaeva Academy Stadium; Attendance: 0 Referee: Timur Kumashev
Note: Match played at the T.S.Segïzbaeva Academy Stadium in Almaty, instead of Kyzylzhar's regular Karasai Stadium in Petropavl. Match played behind closed doors due to the COVID-19 pandemic.

27 October 2020 15	Shakhter Karagandy	0 – 0	Kyzylzhar	Talgar
15:00 (UTC+6)	Y.Tapalov (yellow card) 16'; Baah (yellow card) 59'; Bakayev (yellow card) 80'	Report	Ceesay (yellow card) 27'; B.Shaikhov (yellow card) 61'; Gubanov (yellow card) 63'	Stadium: UTB Talgar; Attendance: 0 Referee: Grigory Moskovchenko
Note: Match played at the UTB Talgar stadium in Talgar, instead of Shakhter Karagandy's regular Shakhter Stadium in Karaganda. Match played behind closed doors due to the COVID-19 pandemic.

31 October 2020 16	Kyzylzhar	2 – 1	Zhetysu	Almaty
17:00 (UTC+6)	T.Muldinov 36'; Drachenko 45+1'; Plătică (yellow card) 64'; A.Kasym (yellow card) 85'; Lobantsev (yellow card) 90'	Report	Darabayev (yellow card) 36'; Zaleski (yellow card) 45+1'; Žulpa 52'; Zhaksylykov (red card) 86'	Stadium: Jas Qyran Stadium; Attendance: 0 Referee: Arman Ismuratov
Note: Match played at the Jas Qyran Stadium in Almaty, instead of Kyzylzhar's regular Karasai Stadium in Petropavl. Match played behind closed doors due to the COVID-19 pandemic.

4 November 2020 17	Caspiy	1 – 1	Kyzylzhar	Talgar
15:00 (UTC+6)	R.Rozybakiev (yellow card) 13'; Shakhmetov (yellow card) 45+2'; A.Nabikhanov 69'	Report	Grigalashvili 7'; Drachenko (yellow card) 34'; I.Aitov (yellow card) 42'	Stadium: UTB Talgar; Attendance: 0 Referee: Anatolyi Vishnichenko
Note: Match played at the Central Stadium in Almaty, instead of Caspiy's regular Karasai Stadium in Petropavl. Match played behind closed doors due to the COVID-19 pandemic.

8 November 2020 18	Kyzylzhar	0 – 1	Tobol	Almaty
15:00 (UTC+6)	Delić (yellow card) 72'; Markelov (yellow card) 90+2'	Report	Amanović (yellow card) 48'; Yerlanov 70'; Muzhikov (yellow card) 90+4'	Stadium: T.S.Segïzbaeva Academy Stadium; Attendance: 0 Referee: Timur Kumashev
Note: Match played at the T.S.Segïzbaeva Academy Stadium in Almaty, instead of Kyzylzhar's regular Karasai Stadium in Petropavl. Match played behind closed doors due to the COVID-19 pandemic.

21 November 2020 19	Kairat	2 – 3	Kyzylzhar	Almaty
15:00 (UTC+6)	N.Dairov (yellow card) 2' (red card) 21'; R.Ibragimov (yellow card) 13'; Usenov 15'; A.Ulshin 33'; A.Adakhadzhiev (yellow card) 58'; Aimbetov (yellow card) 60'; Mikanović (yellow card) 66'; Hovhannisyan (red card) 90'	Report	Drachenko 22' (pen.); Grigalashvili 26'; Delić (yellow card) 32'; Gubanov (yellow card) 81'; T.Muldinov 90+2'	Stadium: Central Stadium; Attendance: 0 Referee: Georgiy Chek
Note: Match played behind closed doors due to the COVID-19 pandemic.

24 November 2020 20	Kyzylzhar	0 – 0	Ordabasy	Talgar
14:00 (UTC+6)	V.Gunchenko (yellow card) 66'	Report	Kleshchenko (yellow card) 83'	Stadium: UTB Talgar; Attendance: 0 Referee: Ruslan Omarov
Note: Match played at the Central Stadium in Almaty, instead of Kyzylzhar's regular Karasai Stadium in Petropavl. Match played behind closed doors due to the COVID-19 pandemic.

27 November 2020 21	Kaisar	1 – 2	Kyzylzhar	Almaty
14:00 (UTC+6)	E.Altynbekov 44' (yellow card) 83'	Report	M.Skorykh 20'; A.Kasym 79'; A.Cheredinov (yellow card) 82'	Stadium: T.S.Segïzbaeva Academy Stadium; Attendance: 0 Referee: Timur Kumashev
Note: Match played at the T.S.Segïzbaeva Academy Stadium in Almaty, instead of Kaisar's regular Gani Muratbayev Stadium in Kyzylorda. Match played behind closed doors due to the COVID-19 pandemic.

30 November 2020 22	Kyzylzhar	0 – 1	Astana	Almaty
13:00 (UTC+6)	I.Aitov (yellow card) 53'; A.Kasym (yellow card) 64'	Report	Mayewski 45+2'; Ebong (yellow card) 59'; Radaković (yellow card) 72'	Stadium: T.S.Segïzbaeva Academy Stadium; Attendance: 0 Referee: Igor Chesnokov
Note: Match played at the T.S.Segïzbaeva Academy Stadium in Almaty, instead of Kyzylzhar's regular Karasai Stadium in Petropavl. Match played behind closed doors due to the COVID-19 pandemic.

==== League table ====
Pos	Team	Pld	W	D	L	GF	GA	GD	Pts	Qualification or relegation
7	Kaisar	20	6	6	8	20	23	−3	24	
8	Taraz	20	5	8	7	19	23	−4	23	
9	Kyzylzhar	20	6	5	9	15	24	−9	23	
10	Caspiy	20	5	2	13	15	34	−19	17	
11	Okzhetpes (R)	20	2	5	13	16	38	−22	11	Relegation to the Kazakhstan First Division

Source: UEFA, Soccerway
Rules for classification: 1) Points; 2) Goal difference; 3) Matches won; 4) Goals scored; 5) Away goals scored; 6) Head-to-head points; 7) Head-to-head matches won; 8) Head-to-head goal difference; 9) Head-to-head goals scored; 10) Head-to-head away goals scored; 11) Draw.
(R) Relegated

=== Kazakhstan Cup ===
July 2020 Last 16	–
(UTC+6)

== Squad statistics ==
As of match played 30 November 2020

=== Appearances and goals ===
No.	Pos	Nat	Player	Total		Premier League		Kazakhstan Cup	
No.	Pos	Nat	Player	Apps	Goals	Apps	Goals	Apps	Goals
3	DF	(Ukraine) UKR	Artem Baranovskyi	10	0	8+2	0	0	0
4	MF	(Russia) RUS	Nikita Bezlikhotnov	3	0	2+1	0	0	0
5	MF	(Argentina) ARG	Pablo Podio	12	0	8+4	0	0	0
6	DF	(Kazakhstan) KAZ	Alibek Kasym	13	1	12+1	1	0	0
7	MF	(Ukraine) UKR	Maksym Drachenko	19	3	19	3	0	0
8	FW	(The Gambia) GAM	Momodou Ceesay	15	1	11+4	1	0	0
9	FW	(Russia) RUS	Ivan Markelov	18	0	12+6	0	0	0
10	MF	(Georgia (country)) GEO	Shota Grigalashvili	18	3	15+3	3	0	0
11	MF	(Kazakhstan) KAZ	Artem Cheredinov	6	0	2+4	0	0	0
12	MF	(Ivory Coast) CIV	Moussa Koné	16	0	16	0	0	0
14	FW	(Armenia) ARM	Ruslan Koryan	8	0	3+5	0	0	0
15	DF	(Kazakhstan) KAZ	Aleksandr Sokolenko	10	1	8+2	1	0	0
16	MF	(Moldova) MDA	Mihai Plătică	20	0	14+6	0	0	0
19	FW	(Kazakhstan) KAZ	Timur Muldinov	19	3	7+12	3	0	0
20	DF	(Kazakhstan) KAZ	Viktor Gunchenko	14	0	12+2	0	0	0
21	MF	(Montenegro) MNE	Uroš Delić	19	0	17+2	0	0	0
23	DF	(Kazakhstan) KAZ	Berik Shaikhov	14	0	12+2	0	0	0
27	DF	(Lithuania) LTU	Vytautas Andriuškevičius	10	0	10	0	0	0
32	GK	(Kazakhstan) KAZ	Vadim Petrov	2	0	2	0	0	0
40	DF	(Kazakhstan) KAZ	Ildar Aitov	10	0	8+2	0	0	0
41	GK	(Russia) RUS	Miroslav Lobantsev	19	0	19	0	0	0
66	DF	(Russia) RUS	Igor Gubanov	10	0	6+4	0	0	0
77	MF	(Kazakhstan) KAZ	Sergei Skorykh	1	0	0+1	0	0	0
78	FW	(Belarus) BLR	Ihar Zyankovich	3	0	1+2	0	0	0
99	FW	(Kazakhstan) KAZ	Maksim Skorykh	5	1	3+2	1	0	0
Players away from Kyzylzhar on loan:
Players who left Kyzylzhar during the season:
4	MF	(Romania) ROU	Gabriel Enache	6	2	3+3	2	0	0
5	MF	(Georgia (country)) GEO	Tamaz Tsetskhladze	3	0	1+2	0	0	0

=== Goal scorers ===
Place	Position	Nation	Number	Name	Premier League	Kazakhstan Cup	Total
1	FW	(Kazakhstan)	19	Timur Muldinov	3	0	3
1	MF	(Ukraine)	7	Maksym Drachenko	3	0	3
1	MF	(Georgia (country))	10	Shota Grigalashvili	3	0	3
4	MF	(Romania)	4	Gabriel Enache	2	0	2
5	DF	(Kazakhstan)	15	Aleksandr Sokolenko	1	0	1
5	FW	(The Gambia)	8	Momodou Ceesay	1	0	1
5	FW	(Kazakhstan)	99	Maksim Skorykh	1	0	1
5	DF	(Kazakhstan)	6	Alibek Kasym	1	0	1
5				Own goal	1	0	1
				TOTALS	16	0	16

=== Clean sheets ===
Place	Position	Nation	Number	Name	Premier League	Kazakhstan Cup	Total
1	GK	(Russia)	41	Miroslav Lobantsev	6	0	6
				TOTALS	6	0	6

=== Disciplinary record ===
Number	Nation	Position	Name	Premier League		Kazakhstan Cup		Total	
Number	Nation	Position	Name	Booked	Sent off (straight red)	Booked	Sent off (straight red)	Booked	Sent off (straight red)
6	(Kazakhstan)	DF	Alibek Kasym	4	0	0	0	4	0
7	(Ukraine)	MF	Maksym Drachenko	5	0	0	0	5	0
8	(The Gambia)	FW	Momodou Ceesay	2	0	0	0	2	0
9	(Russia)	FW	Ivan Markelov	4	0	0	0	4	0
11	(Kazakhstan)	MF	Artem Cheredinov	1	0	0	0	1	0
12	(Ivory Coast)	MF	Moussa Koné	2	0	0	0	2	0
15	(Kazakhstan)	DF	Aleksandr Sokolenko	2	0	0	0	2	0
16	(Moldova)	MF	Mihai Plătică	2	0	0	0	2	0
19	(Kazakhstan)	FW	Timur Muldinov	2	0	0	0	2	0
20	(Kazakhstan)	DF	Viktor Gunchenko	3	0	0	0	3	0
21	(Montenegro)	MF	Uroš Delić	6	0	0	0	6	0
23	(Kazakhstan)	DF	Berik Shaikhov	4	0	0	0	4	0
40	(Kazakhstan)	DF	Ildar Aitov	2	0	0	0	2	0
41	(Russia)	GK	Miroslav Lobantsev	2	0	0	0	2	0
66	(Russia)	DF	Igor Gubanov	4	0	0	0	4	0
Players who left Kyzylzhar during the season:
			TOTALS	45	0	0	0	45	0
