= 2017 FC Taraz season =

FC Taraz
2017 season
- Manager: Vait Talgayev
- Stadium: Central Stadium
- Kazakhstan Premier League: 11th
- Kazakhstan Cup: Last 16 vs Kairat
- Top goalscorer: League: Baktiyar Zaynutdinov (7); All: Baktiyar Zaynutdinov (7)
Home colours	Away colours

The 2017 FC Taraz season is the ninth successive season that the club will play in the Kazakhstan Premier League, the highest tier of association football in Kazakhstan, and 24th in total.

== Season events ==
On 4 January, Taraz announced the appointment of Vait Talgayev as their new manager, replacing Yuriy Maksymov.

Despite originally being relegated at the end of the 2016 season to the Kazakhstan First Division, Taraz were re-instated to the Premier League on 3 February 2017, when the Football Federation of Kazakhstan ruled that Altai Semey did not meet the required entry requirements for the Premier League, and would be replaced by Taraz.

== Squad ==
As of 6 July 2017

Note: Flags indicate national team as defined under FIFA eligibility rules; some limited exceptions apply. Players may hold more than one non-FIFA nationality.

No.	Pos.	Nation	Player
1	GK	KAZ	Vladimir Loginovsky
3	DF	KAZ	Anton Moltusinov
4	DF	KAZ	Bekzat Shadmanov
6	DF	KAZ	Kurmet Karaman
7	MF	KAZ	Abzal Taubay
8	MF	GUI	Mohammed Diarra
9	MF	KAZ	Zhakyp Kozhamberdi
10	MF	KAZ	Gabriel Kahn
11	MF	KAZ	Baktiyar Zaynutdinov
12	DF	KAZ	Ilya Vorotnikov
14	FW	KAZ	Timur Baizhanov
15	DF	MNE	Nemanja Mijušković
17	DF	KAZ	Nurtas Kurgulin
19	MF	KAZ	Ardak Karpyk
20	DF	KAZ	Maksat Amirkhanov

No.	Pos.	Nation	Player
21	FW	HAI	Jean-Eudes Maurice
22	DF	KAZ	Madiyar Nuraly
24	GK	KAZ	Dzhurakhon Babakhanov
25	MF	RUS	Yevgeni Shipitsin
26	MF	KAZ	Sanjar Nurlybaev
27	MF	KAZ	Rinat Khairullin
28	FW	UKR	Maksym Feshchuk
32	MF	RUS	Andrei Gorbanets
35	GK	KAZ	Bobyr Zaynutdinov
70	FW	KAZ	Yerkebulan Seidakhmet
77	GK	KAZ	Arslan Satubaldin
84	DF	TJK	Davron Ergashev
88	DF	KAZ	Evgeni Goryachi
99	FW	SEN	Malick Mané

== Transfers ==
=== Winter ===
In: Note: Flags indicate national team as defined under FIFA eligibility rules; some limited exceptions apply. Players may hold more than one non-FIFA nationality.

No.	Pos.	Nation	Player
1	GK	KAZ	Vladimir Loginovsky (from (Kazakhstan) Astana)
3	DF	KAZ	Anton Moltusinov (from (Kazakhstan) Kaisar)
4	DF	KAZ	Bekzat Shadmanov
5	DF	KAZ	Adlet Kenesbek
8	MF	GUI	Mohammed Diarra (from (Kazakhstan) Altai Semey)
9	MF	KAZ	Zhakyp Kozhamberdi (from (Kazakhstan) Okzhetpes)
10	MF	KAZ	Gabriel Kahn
14	FW	KAZ	Timur Baizhanov (from (Kazakhstan) Kyzylzhar)
15	DF	MNE	Nemanja Mijušković (from (North Macedonia) Vardar)
17	DF	KAZ	Nurtas Kurgulin (from (Kazakhstan) Tobol)
18	MF	KAZ	Maksim Azovskiy (from (Kazakhstan) Zhetysu)
21	FW	HAI	Jean-Eudes Maurice (from (Vietnam) Sài Gòn)
23	FW	RUS	Ruslan Mukhametshin (from (Russia) Arsenal Tula)
24	GK	KAZ	Dzhurakhon Babakhanov (from (Kazakhstan) Okzhetpes)
25	MF	RUS	Yevgeni Shipitsin (from (Russia) Sochi)
26	MF	KAZ	Sanjar Nurlybaev
28	FW	UKR	Maksym Feshchuk (from (Moldova) Dacia Chișinău)
32	MF	RUS	Andrei Gorbanets (from (Russia) Arsenal Tula)
35	GK	KAZ	Bobyr Zaynutdinov (from (Kazakhstan) Lashyn)
70	FW	KAZ	Yerkebulan Seidakhmet (from (Kazakhstan) Taraz School)
71	MF	KAZ	Madiyar Raimbek (from (Kazakhstan) Kairat)
77	GK	KAZ	Arslan Satubaldin (from (Kazakhstan) Altai Semey)

Out: Note: Flags indicate national team as defined under FIFA eligibility rules; some limited exceptions apply. Players may hold more than one non-FIFA nationality.

No.	Pos.	Nation	Player
1	GK	KAZ	Aleksandr Grigorenko
2	DF	KAZ	Daniyar Bayaliev
4	DF	KAZ	Ilya Vorotnikov (to (Kazakhstan) Irtysh Pavlodar)
6	MF	KAZ	Marat Shakhmetov
7	MF	KAZ	Alisher Suley (to (Kazakhstan) Atyrau)
8	MF	KAZ	Vitali Yevstigneyev
10	MF	KAZ	Bauyrzhan Baitana (to (Kazakhstan) Aktobe)
12	FW	ROU	Ioan Mera (to (Romania) Politehnica Timișoara)
13	FW	SEN	Malick Mané (to (China) Nei Mongol Zhongyou)
17	MF	KAZ	Oleg Nedashkovsky
19	DF	KAZ	Dmitri Yevstigneyev (to (Kazakhstan) Kaisar)}
21	MF	KAZ	Bakhytzhan Rymtaev
25	MF	UKR	Taras Danilyuk
44	MF	KAZ	Adilet Abdenabi
50	DF	RUS	Anton Grigoryev (to (Russia) Volgar Astrakhan)
67	MF	UKR	Andriy Yakovlyev
71	FW	KAZ	Daurenbek Tazhimbetov (to (Kazakhstan) Shakhter Karagandy)
75	FW	UKR	Oleksandr Pyschur (to (Uzbekistan) Shurtan Guzar)
99	DF	KAZ	Aleksandr Kirov

=== Summer ===
In: Note: Flags indicate national team as defined under FIFA eligibility rules; some limited exceptions apply. Players may hold more than one non-FIFA nationality.

No.	Pos.	Nation	Player
2	DF	KAZ	Vladislav Kuzmin
12	DF	KAZ	Ilya Vorotnikov (from (Kazakhstan) Irtysh Pavlodar)
27	MF	KAZ	Rinat Khairullin (from (Kazakhstan) Shakhter Karagandy)
88	DF	KAZ	Evgeni Goryachi (from (Kazakhstan) Baikonur)
99	FW	SEN	Malick Mané (from (China) Nei Mongol Zhongyou)

Out: Note: Flags indicate national team as defined under FIFA eligibility rules; some limited exceptions apply. Players may hold more than one non-FIFA nationality.

No.	Pos.	Nation	Player
2	DF	KAZ	Vladislav Kuzmin
5	DF	KAZ	Adlet Kenesbek
18	MF	KAZ	Maksim Azovskiy
23	FW	RUS	Ruslan Mukhametshin (to (Russia) Mordovia Saransk)
71	MF	KAZ	Madiyar Raimbek

== Competitions ==
=== Kazakhstan Premier League ===
==== Results summary ====
Overall								Home						Away					
Pld	W	D	L	GF	GA	GD	Pts	W	D	L	GF	GA	GD	W	D	L	GF	GA	GD
33	8	8	17	29	50	−21	32	5	5	7	14	18	−4	3	3	10	15	32	−17

Last updated: 5 November 2017.
Source: See Results

==== Results by round ====
Round	1	2	3	4	5	6	7	8	9	10	11	12	13	14	15	16	17	18	19	20	21	22	23	24	25	26	27	28	29	30	31	32	33
Ground	H	A	H	A	H	A	H	A	H	A	A	H	A	H	A	H	A	H	A	H	A	A	H	A	H	A	H	A	H	A	H	A	H
Result	D	L	D	L	W	L	D	L	L	D	L	W	L	W	L	W	D	L	W	D	W	W	L	D	D	L	L	L	W	L	L	L	L
Position	7	8	9	10	9	10	8	8	9	9	10	10	10	9	9	7	8	10	7	8	8	6	8	7	7	7	8	11	9	9	11	11	11

Source: See Results
A = Away; H = Home; W = Win; D = Draw; L = Loss

==== Results ====
8 March 2017 1	Taraz	0 – 0	Shakhter Karagandy	Taraz
15:00 (UTC+6)	Ergashev (red card) 51'; M.Amirkhanov (yellow card) 64'	Report	Skorykh (yellow card) 6'; Aiyegbusi (yellow card) 54'; Tazhimbetov (yellow card) 90+3'	Stadium: Central Stadium; Attendance: 2,000; Referee: Igor Chesnokov

12 March 2017 2	Kaisar	2 – 1	Taraz	Kyzylorda
15:00 (UTC+6)	Arzhanov 34'; Ntibazonkiza 71'	Report	Mukhametshin 15'; Gorbanets (yellow card) 31' (yellow-red card) 80'	Stadium: Gani Muratbayev Stadium; Attendance: 3,500; Referee: Grigory Moskovchenko

17 March 2017 3	Taraz	0 – 0	Kairat	Taraz
15:00 (UTC+6)	Diarra (yellow card) 54'	Report	Arshavin (yellow card) 13'; Arzo (yellow card) 13'; Turysbek (yellow card) 54'	Stadium: Central Stadium; Attendance: 4,500; Referee: Denis Izmailov

1 April 2017 4	Tobol	1 – 0	Taraz	Kostanay
14:00 (UTC+6)	Despotović 50' (yellow card) 79'; Šimkovič (red card) 88'	Report	A.Taubay (yellow card) 55'; Y.Seidakhmet (yellow card) 86'	Stadium: Stadion Zatobolets; Attendance: 2,500; Referee: Timur Kumashev

8 April 2017 5	Taraz	2 – 1	Ordabasy	Taraz
16:00 (UTC+6)	Mukhametshin 16'; Kozhamberdi 31'; A.Moltusinov (yellow card) 87'	Report	M.Tolebek 30'	Stadium: Central Stadium; Attendance: 3,000; Referee: Marat Iskakov

12 April 2017 6	Irtysh Pavlodar	5 – 2	Taraz	Pavlodar
19:00 (UTC+6)	A.Darabayev (yellow card) 8' (goal) 53', 64'; Fonseca 20'; António (yellow card) 25'; Aliev 76'; Dja Djédjé 82'	Report	Mukhametshin 17'; Feshchuk 66'	Stadium: Central Stadium; Attendance: 2,800; Referee: Denis Tevyashov

16 April 2017 7	Taraz	0 – 0	Akzhayik	Taraz
17:00 (UTC+6)	Ergashev (yellow card) 73'; Shipitsin (yellow card) 77'	Report	Coronel (yellow card) 49'	Stadium: Central Stadium; Attendance: 3,000; Referee: Georgiy Chekhovskiy

23 April 2017 8	Astana	4 – 0	Taraz	Astana
16:00 (UTC+6)	Grahovac 13'; Kabananga 33', 84'; Beisebekov (yellow card) 34'; D.Zhalmukan 43'	Report	M.Amirkhanov (yellow card) 40'	Stadium: Tarlan Arena; Attendance: 1,000; Referee: Furkhat Atazhanov

29 April 2017 9	Taraz	1 – 2	Atyrau	Taraz
18:00 (UTC+6)	Maurice (yellow card) 9'; Gorbanets (yellow card) 23'; Ba.Zaynutdinov (yellow card) 33' (goal) 72'; D.Babakhanov (yellow card) 62'	Report	Đokić (yellow card) 45+1'; V.Li 64'; Lobjanidze (yellow card) 75'; Chichulin (yellow card) 82'; Maksimović 87' (yellow card) 88'	Stadium: Central Stadium; Attendance: 3,200; Referee: Timur Kumashev

2 May 2017 10	Aktobe	1 – 1	Taraz	Aktobe
20:00 (UTC+6)	Juninho (yellow card) 27'; Mamute (yellow card) 33'; Shestakov (yellow card) 44'; Júnior (yellow card) 45+1'; B.Baitana 57'	Report	Feshchuk 27'; B.Shadmanov (yellow card) 39'; Kurgulin (yellow card) 45+1'; M.Raimbek (yellow card) 87'; Mukhametshin (yellow card) 90+2'	Stadium: Central Stadium; Attendance: 8,000; Referee: Georgiy Chekhovskiy

6 May 2017 11	Taraz	0 – 1	Okzhetpes	Taraz
18:00 (UTC+6)	Ergashev (yellow card) 62'; Kurgulin (yellow card) 66'	Report	B.Shaikhov (yellow card) 8' (yellow-red card) 26'; Dosmagambetov 45+1'; Chertov (yellow card) 86'	Stadium: Central Stadium; Attendance: 3,000; Referee: Grigory Moskovchenko

14 May 2017 12	Taraz	2 – 1	Kaisar	Taraz
19:00 (UTC+6)	Gorbanets (yellow card) 55' (yellow-red card) 60'; Diarra 69'; A.Taubay 74'	Report	Coureur (yellow card) 37'; M.Bayzhanov 45'; D.Yevstigneyev (yellow card) 90'	Stadium: Central Stadium; Attendance: 5,000; Referee: Aydin Rakhimbayev

20 May 2017 13	Kairat	4 – 0	Taraz	Almaty
17:00 (UTC+6)	Turysbek 55'; Gohou 58'; Isael 80'; Islamkhan 87' (pen.)	Report	M.Amirkhanov (yellow card) 55'	Stadium: Central Stadium; Attendance: 8,000; Referee: Bolat Karlibayev

27 May 2017 14	Taraz	1 – 0	Tobol	Taraz
18:00 (UTC+6)	Shipitsin (yellow card) 31'; Azovskiy (yellow card) 71'; Baizhanov 82'	Report	Glavina (yellow card) 22'; G.Sartakov (yellow card) 41'; Moldakaraev (yellow card) 56'	Stadium: Central Stadium; Attendance: 4,000; Referee: Furkat Atajanov

3 June 2017 15	Ordabasy	3 – 0	Taraz	Shymkent
18:00 (UTC+6)	E.Tungyshbaev 5'; Nurgaliev 13'; Gogua 86'	Report	Kozhamberdi (yellow card) 35'; B.Shadmanov (yellow card) 56'	Stadium: Kazhymukan Munaitpasov Stadium; Attendance: 3,000; Referee: Timur Kumashev

18 June 2017 16	Taraz	2 – 0	Irtysh Pavlodar	Taraz
19:00 (UTC+6)	Ba.Zaynutdinov 13'; Y.Seidakhmet 24'	Report	A.Darabayev (yellow card) 45+1'	Stadium: Central Stadium; Attendance: 3,200; Referee: Daniyar Sakhi

25 June 2017 17	Akzhayik	2 – 2	Taraz	Oral
18:00 (UTC+6)	Azuka 26', 87' (pen.)	Report	Ba.Zaynutdinov 54'; Feshchuk 65' (yellow card) 78'; Shipitsin (yellow card) 85'; B.Shadmanov (yellow card) 89'	Stadium: Petr Atoyan Stadium; Attendance: 3,000; Referee: Georgiy Chekhovskiy

1 July 2017 18	Taraz	0 – 1	Astana	Taraz
19:00 (UTC+6)		Report	Postnikov (yellow card) 40'; Kabananga 67'	Stadium: Central Stadium; Attendance: 6,500; Referee: Furkat Atajanov

8 July 2017 19	Atyrau	1 – 3	Taraz	Atyrau
20:00 (UTC+6)	E.Abdrakhmanov (yellow card) 25'; Obšivač (yellow card) 57'; Khairullin 64'	Report	Maurice 21', 71'; A.Taubay 75'	Stadium: Munaishy Stadium; Attendance: 4,500; Referee: Daniyar Sakhi

15 July 2017 20	Taraz	1 – 1	Aktobe	Taraz
19:00 (UTC+6)	Mijušković 45+1'	Report	Shestakov (yellow card) 28'; B.Kairov (yellow card) 45+1'; B.Shadmanov 50' (o.g.)	Stadium: Central Stadium; Attendance: 3,500; Referee: Bolat Karlibayev

22 July 2017 21	Okzhetpes	0 – 1	Taraz	Shchuchinsk
18:00 (UTC+6)	Dosmagambetov (yellow card) 30'; T.Adyrbekov (yellow card) 38'	Report	Mané 45+1'	Stadium: Zhaksy Stadium; Attendance: 500; Referee: Aleksei Bobrov

29 July 2017 22	Shakhter Karagandy	0 – 1	Taraz	Karaganda
18:00 (UTC+6)	Stanojević (yellow card) 30'	Report	Maurice 83'	Stadium: Shakhter Stadium; Attendance: 4,000; Referee: Timur Kumashev

13 August 2017 23	Taraz	0 – 1	Akzhayik	Taraz
19:00 (UTC+6)	Maurice (yellow card) 59'; D.Babakhanov (yellow card) 90+2'	Report	Govedarica (yellow card) 30'; D.Schmidt 72'; Coronel (yellow card) 90+3'	Stadium: Central Stadium; Attendance: 4,000; Referee: Igor Chesnokov

20 August 2017 24	Tobol	1 – 1	Taraz	Kostanay
18:00 (UTC+6)	D.Miroshnichenko (yellow card) 24'; Moldakaraev (yellow card) 57'; D.Zhalmukan (yellow card) 65'; Kvekveskiri 72' (pen.); Šikov (yellow card) 90+5'	Report	B.Shadmanov (yellow card) 32' (yellow-red card) 70'; Gorbanets (yellow card) 70'; Mané 77'	Stadium: Central Stadium; Attendance: 6,300; Referee: Bolat Saryev

26 August 2017 25	Taraz	1 – 1	Irtysh Pavlodar	Taraz
19:00 (UTC+6)	Feshchuk 7'; Diarra (yellow card) 57'; Mijušković (yellow card) 68'; Vorotnikov (yellow card) 85'	Report	António 48'; R.Yesimov (yellow card) 61'; Bugaiov (yellow card) 67'	Stadium: Central Stadium; Attendance: 3,500; Referee: Marat Iskakov

10 September 2017 26	Ordabasy	1 – 0	Taraz	Shymkent
19:00 (UTC+6)	Kovalchuk 41'; Smakov (yellow card) 51'; Nusserbayev (yellow card) 61'; Nurgaliev (yellow card) 69'	Report	Mané (yellow card) 26'; Diarra (yellow card) 36'; A.Taubay (yellow card) 75'; Kurgulin (yellow card) 80'	Stadium: Kazhymukan Munaitpasov Stadium; Attendance: 5,300; Referee: Igor Chesnokov

16 September 2017 27	Taraz	1 – 5	Kairat	Taraz
18:00 (UTC+6)	A.Taubay (yellow card) 22'; D.Babakhanov (yellow card) 64'; Kozhamberdi 83'	Report	Gohou 17'; Elek (yellow card) 38'; Bateau (yellow card) 44'; Islamkhan 52', 64' (pen.); Anene 87'; Arshavin 88'	Stadium: Central Stadium; Attendance: 3,500; Referee: Artyom Kuchin

23 September 2017 28	Astana	2 – 0	Taraz	Astana
15:00 (UTC+6)	Twumasi 21'; Postnikov 26'	Report	Feshchuk (yellow card) 75'	Stadium: Astana Arena; Attendance: 2,000; Referee: Denis Izmailov

1 October 2017 29	Taraz	1 – 0	Aktobe	Taraz
17:00 (UTC+6)	Maurice 17'; Mijušković (yellow card) 43'; Ergashev (yellow card) 47'	Report	Muarem (yellow card) 19'; Nane (yellow card) 55'	Stadium: Central Stadium; Attendance: 5,000; Referee: Marat Iskakov

15 October 2017 30	Okzhetpes	2 – 1	Taraz	Kokshetau
15:00 (UTC+6)	Fedin 1'; T.Adyrbekov (yellow card) 25'; Abdulin 26' (yellow card) 77'; Buleshev (yellow card) 85'	Report	Maurice (yellow card) 5'; Mané 25' (pen.) (yellow card) 85'; Ergashev (yellow card) 36'; Feshchuk (yellow card) 72'	Stadium: Okzhetpes Stadium; Attendance: 3,000; Referee: Denis Tevyashov

21 October 2017 31	Taraz	2 – 3	Shakhter Karagandy	Taraz
16:00 (UTC+6)	Ba.Zaynutdinov 17', 28'; Diarra (yellow card) 42'; Kurgulin (yellow card) 81'; M.Amirkhanov (yellow card) 83'; Mijušković (yellow card) 85'	Report	Szöke (yellow card) 40'; Stojanović 50' (pen.), 76', 78'; I.Mangutkin (yellow card) 53'; K.Ermekov (yellow card) 67'; I.Shatsky (yellow card) 90+5'	Stadium: Central Stadium; Attendance: 3,000; Referee: Timur Kumashev

28 October 2017 32	Atyrau	3 – 2	Taraz	Atyrau
15:00 (UTC+6)	Sikimić 71'; Khairullin 77'; Ablitarov 81'	Report	Mané (yellow card) 11'; Kozhamberdi (yellow card) 68'; Ba.Zaynutdinov 69', 79'	Stadium: Munaishy Stadium; Attendance: 2,500; Referee: Artyom Kuchin

5 November 2017 33	Taraz	0 – 1	Kaisar	Taraz
15:00 (UTC+6)	Feshchuk (yellow card) 40'; Ergashev (yellow card) 75'	Report	D.Yevstigneyev 57'; Bojović (yellow card) 75' (red card) 81'; A.Zhakhayev (yellow card) 83'; Graf (yellow card) 85'	Stadium: Central Stadium; Attendance: 1,000; Referee: Grigory Moskovchenko

==== League table ====
Pos	Team	Pld	W	D	L	GF	GA	GD	Pts	Qualification or relegation
8	Atyrau (Note: Atyrau started the season with –9 points as a punishment for unpaid debts to former manager Zoran Filipović. On 24 April 2017, Atyrau had six points returned to after they cleared their debt to Filipović, with three points retained due to debts to Jonathas.)	33	10	8	15	34	54	−20	35	
9	Aktobe	33	8	9	16	38	46	−8	33	
10	Akzhayik (O)	33	7	9	17	29	47	−18	30	Qualification for the relegation play-offs
11	Taraz (Note: Taraz had six points deducted as a punishment for unpaid debts to former player Obiora Odita.) (R)	33	8	8	17	29	50	−21	26	Relegation to the Kazakhstan First Division
12	Okzhetpes (R)	33	7	3	23	28	61	−33	24	Relegation to the Kazakhstan First Division

Source: UEFA, Soccerway
Rules for classification: 1) Points; 2) Head-to-head points; 3) Head-to-head matches won; 4) Head-to-head goal difference; 5) Head-to-head goals scored; 6) Head-to-head away goals scored; 7) Goal difference; 8) Matches won; 9) Goals scored; 10) Away goals scored; 11) Draw.
(O) Play-off winners; (R) Relegated

=== Kazakhstan Cup ===
19 April 2017 Last 16	Kairat	2 – 0	Taraz	Almaty
19:30 (UTC+6)	Zhukov 33' (yellow card) 50'; Iličević 45+1'	Summary	Kozhamberdi (yellow card) 19' (yellow-red card) 29'; Shipitsin (yellow card) 45+1'	Stadium: Central Stadium; Attendance: 6,000; Referee: Denis Izmailov

== Squad statistics ==
As of Match played 5 November 2017

=== Appearances and goals ===
No.	Pos	Nat	Player	Total		Premier League		Kazakhstan Cup	
No.	Pos	Nat	Player	Apps	Goals	Apps	Goals	Apps	Goals
1	GK	(Kazakhstan) KAZ	Vladimir Loginovsky	7	0	7	0	0	0
3	DF	(Kazakhstan) KAZ	Anton Moltusinov	15	0	11+4	0	0	0
4	DF	(Kazakhstan) KAZ	Bekzat Shadmanov	24	0	23	0	1	0
7	MF	(Kazakhstan) KAZ	Abzal Taubay	19	2	15+3	2	0+1	0
8	MF	(Mali) MLI	Mohammed Diarra	31	1	29+2	1	0	0
9	MF	(Kazakhstan) KAZ	Zhakyp Kozhamberdi	27	2	18+8	2	1	0
10	MF	(Kazakhstan) KAZ	Gabriel Kahn	1	0	0	0	0+1	0
11	MF	(Kazakhstan) KAZ	Baktiyar Zaynutdinov	28	7	24+3	7	1	0
12	DF	(Kazakhstan) KAZ	Ilya Vorotnikov	9	0	9	0	0	0
14	FW	(Kazakhstan) KAZ	Timur Baizhanov	12	1	2+10	1	0	0
15	DF	(Montenegro) MNE	Nemanja Mijušković	27	1	25+2	1	0	0
17	DF	(Kazakhstan) KAZ	Nurtas Kurgulin	9	0	8+1	0	0	0
20	DF	(Kazakhstan) KAZ	Maksat Amirkhanov	30	0	28+2	0	0	0
21	FW	(Haiti) HAI	Jean-Eudes Maurice	26	4	21+4	4	1	0
22	DF	(Kazakhstan) KAZ	Madiyar Nuraly	1	0	0	0	1	0
24	GK	(Kazakhstan) KAZ	Dzhurakhon Babakhanov	28	0	26+1	0	1	0
25	MF	(Russia) RUS	Yevgeni Shipitsin	32	0	31	0	1	0
27	MF	(Kazakhstan) KAZ	Rinat Khairullin	1	0	0+1	0	0	0
28	FW	(Ukraine) UKR	Maksym Feshchuk	29	4	25+4	4	0	0
32	MF	(Russia) RUS	Andrei Gorbanets	26	0	25	0	1	0
70	FW	(Kazakhstan) KAZ	Yerkebulan Seidakhmet	16	1	5+10	1	1	0
84	DF	(Tajikistan) TJK	Davron Ergashev	21	0	10+10	0	1	0
88	DF	(Kazakhstan) KAZ	Evgeni Goryachi	2	0	0+2	0	0	0
99	FW	(Senegal) SEN	Malick Mané	13	3	12+1	3	0	0
Players away from Taraz on loan:
Players who left Taraz during the season:
18	DF	(Kazakhstan) KAZ	Maksim Azovskiy	7	0	0+6	0	1	0
23	FW	(Russia) RUS	Ruslan Mukhametshin	12	3	10+1	3	0+1	0
71	MF	(Kazakhstan) KAZ	Madiyar Raimbek	3	0	0+3	0	0	0

=== Goal scorers ===
Place	Position	Nation	Number	Name	Premier League	Kazakhstan Cup	Total
1	MF	(Kazakhstan)	11	Baktiyar Zaynutdinov	7	0	7
2	FW	(Ukraine)	28	Maksym Feshchuk	4	0	4
2	FW	(Haiti)	21	Jean-Eudes Maurice	4	0	4
4	FW	(Russia)	23	Ruslan Mukhametshin	3	0	3
4	FW	(Senegal)	99	Malick Mané	3	0	3
6	MF	(Kazakhstan)	7	Abzal Taubay	2	0	2
6	FW	(Kazakhstan)	9	Zhakyp Kozhamberdi	2	0	2
8	MF	(Mali)	8	Mohammed Diarra	1	0	1
8	FW	(Kazakhstan)	14	Timur Baizhanov	1	0	1
8	FW	(Kazakhstan)	70	Yerkebulan Seidakhmet	1	0	1
8	DF	(Montenegro)	15	Nemanja Mijušković	1	0	1
				TOTALS	27	0	27

=== Disciplinary record ===
Number	Nation	Position	Name	Premier League		Kazakhstan Cup		Total	
Number	Nation	Position	Name	Yellow card	Red card	Yellow card	Red card	Yellow card	Red card
3	(Kazakhstan)	DF	Anton Moltusinov	1	0	0	0	1	0
4	(Kazakhstan)	DF	Bekzat Shadmanov	5	0	0	0	5	1
7	(Kazakhstan)	MF	Abzal Taubay	3	0	0	0	3	0
8	(Mali)	MF	Mohammed Diarra	4	0	0	0	4	0
9	(Kazakhstan)	MF	Zhakyp Kozhamberdi	2	0	2	1	4	1
11	(Kazakhstan)	MF	Baktiyar Zaynutdinov	1	0	0	0	1	0
12	(Kazakhstan)	DF	Ilya Vorotnikov	1	0	0	0	1	0
15	(Montenegro)	DF	Nemanja Mijušković	3	0	0	0	3	0
17	(Kazakhstan)	DF	Nurtas Kurgulin	4	0	0	0	4	0
18	(Kazakhstan)	DF	Maksim Azovskiy	1	0	0	0	1	0
20	(Kazakhstan)	DF	Maksat Amirkhanov	4	0	0	0	4	0
21	(Haiti)	FW	Jean-Eudes Maurice	3	0	0	0	3	0
23	(Russia)	FW	Ruslan Mukhametshin	1	0	0	0	1	0
24	(Kazakhstan)	GK	Dzhurakhon Babakhanov	3	0	0	0	3	0
25	(Russia)	MF	Yevgeni Shipitsin	3	0	1	0	4	0
28	(Ukraine)	FW	Maksym Feshchuk	4	0	0	0	4	0
32	(Russia)	MF	Andrei Gorbanets	6	2	0	0	6	2
70	(Kazakhstan)	FW	Yerkebulan Seidakhmet	1	0	0	0	1	0
71	(Kazakhstan)	MF	Madiyar Raimbek	1	0	0	0	1	0
84	(Tajikistan)	DF	Davron Ergashev	5	1	0	0	5	1
99	(Senegal)	FW	Malick Mané	3	0	0	0	3	0
			TOTALS	58	4	3	1	61	5
