= Miroslav Lobantsev =

Russian footballer

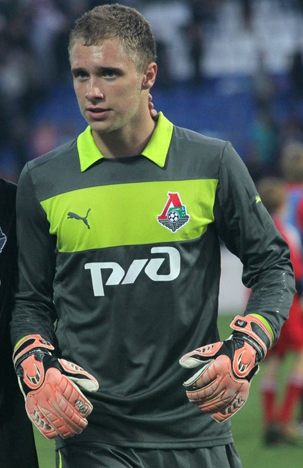
- Lobantsev with Lokomotiv in 2012

Personal information
- Full name: Miroslav Aleksandrovich Lobantsev
- Date of birth: 27 May 1995 (age 31)
- Place of birth: Moscow, Russia
- Height: 1.89 m (6 ft 2 in)
- Position: Goalkeeper

Team information
- Current team: Okzhetpes
- Number: 22

Youth career
- –2004: FC Spartak Moscow
- 2004–2012: FC Lokomotiv Moscow

Senior career*
Years	Team	Apps	(Gls)
2012–2018	Lokomotiv Moscow	3	(0)
2015–2016	→ Krylia Sovetov (loan)	1	(0)
2018–2019	Rotor Volgograd	28	(0)
2020–2023	Kyzylzhar	69	(0)
2023	Aktobe	2	(0)
2024	Yelimay	6	(0)
2024	Zhenis	4	(0)
2025	Kyzylzhar	10	(0)
2026–	Okzhetpes	30	(0)

International career^{‡}
2011	Russia U-16	4	(0)
2011–2012	Russia U-17	6	(0)
2013	Russia U-18	6	(0)
2013–2014	Russia U-19	8	(0)
2013–2015	Russia U-21	10	(0)
- * Club domestic league appearances and goals as of 1 November 2026 ‡ National team caps and goals as of 27 March 2015

Miroslav Aleksandrovich Lobantsev (Russian: Мирослав Александрович Лобанцев; born 27 May 1995) is a Russian professional football player who plays as a goalkeeper for Kazakhstani club Okzhetpes.

== Club career ==
He made his debut in the Russian Premier League on 20 July 2012 for Lokomotiv Moscow in a game against Mordovia Saransk.

6 March 2020, Kyzylzhar announced the signing of Lobantsev.

On 14 January 2026, Kyzylzhar announced the departure of Lobantsev.

== Career statistics ==
=== Club ===
As of match played 30 October 2021

Appearances and goals by club, season and competition
Club	Season	League			National Cup		Continental		Other		Total	
Club	Season	Division	Apps	Goals	Apps	Goals	Apps	Goals	Apps	Goals	Apps	Goals
Lokomotiv Moscow	2011–12	Russian Premier League	0	0	0	0	0 (Note: Appearances in the UEFA Europa League)	0	-		0	0
Lokomotiv Moscow	2012–13	Russian Premier League	3	0	1	0	-		-		4	0
Lokomotiv Moscow	2013–14	Russian Premier League	0	0	0	0	-		-		0	0
Lokomotiv Moscow	2014–15	Russian Premier League	0	0	0	0	0	0	-		0	0
Lokomotiv Moscow	2015–16	Russian Premier League	0	0	0	0	0	0	0 (Note: Appearances in the Russian Super Cup)	0	0	0
Lokomotiv Moscow	2016–17	Russian Premier League	0	0	0	0	-		-		0	0
Lokomotiv Moscow	2017–18	Russian Premier League	0	0	0	0	0	0	0	0	0	0
Lokomotiv Moscow	Total		3	0	1	0	-	-	-	-	4	0
Krylia Sovetov (loan)	2015–16	Russian Premier League	1	0	1	0	-		-		2	0
Rotor Volgograd	2018–19	Russian FNL	24	0	0	0	-		-		24	0
Rotor Volgograd	2019–20	Russian FNL	4	0	1	0	-		-		5	0
Rotor Volgograd	Total		28	0	1	0	-	-	-	-	29	0
Kyzylzhar	2020	Kazakhstan Premier League	19	0	0	0	-		-		19	0
Kyzylzhar	2021	Kazakhstan Premier League	25	0	5	0	-		-		30	0
Kyzylzhar	2022	Kazakhstan Premier League	25	0	1	0	4 (Note: Appearances in the UEFA Conference League)	0	-		30	0
Kyzylzhar	Total		69	0	6	0	4	0	-	-	79	0
Aktobe	2023	Kazakhstan Premier League	2	0	2	0	-		-		4	0
Yelimay	2024	Kazakhstan Premier League	6	0	2	0	-		-		8	0
Zhenis	2024	Kazakhstan Premier League	4	0	0	0	-		2 (Note: Appearances in the Kazakhstan League Cup)	0	6	0
Kyzylzhar	2025	Kazakhstan Premier League	10	0	4	0	-		-		14	0
Career total			123	0	17	0	4	0	2	0	146	0
