= Bakhtiyar Zaynutdinov =

Kazakh footballer (born 1998)

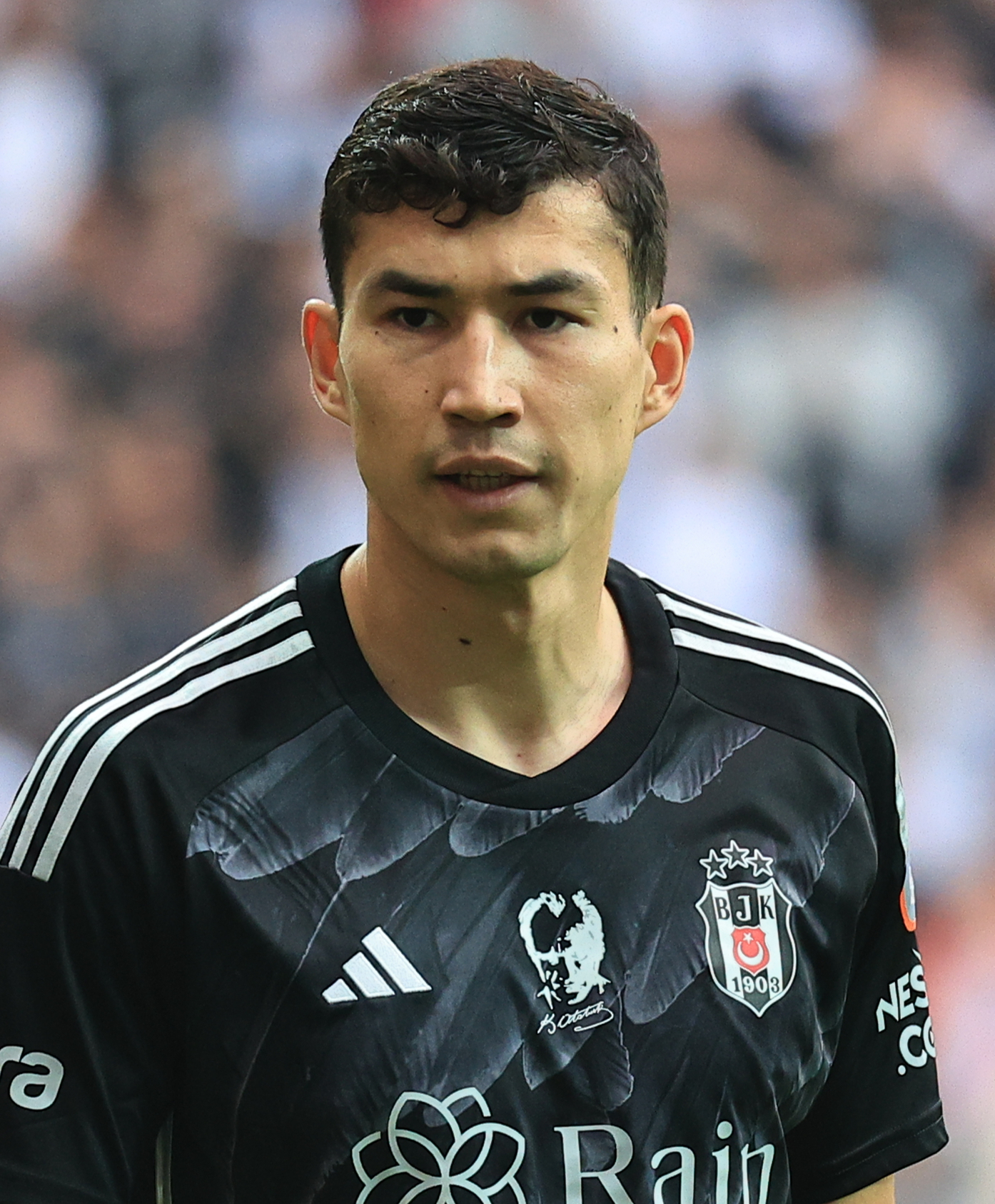
- Zaynutdinov with Beşiktaş in 2023

Personal information
- Full name: Bakhtiyar Batyrzhanuly Zaynutdinov
- Date of birth: 2 April 1998 (age 28)
- Place of birth: Taraz, Kazakhstan
- Height: 1.83 m (6 ft 0 in)
- Positions: Winger; left-back

Team information
- Current team: Dynamo Moscow
- Number: 19

Youth career
- Taraz

Senior career*
Years	Team	Apps	(Gls)
2015–2017	Taraz	27	(7)
2018–2019	Astana	27	(5)
2019–2020	Rostov	31	(4)
2020–2023	CSKA Moscow	64	(5)
2023–2025	Beşiktaş	36	(0)
2025–	Dynamo Moscow	8	(0)

International career^{‡}
2017	Kazakhstan U21	4	(1)
2018–	Kazakhstan	44	(15)
- * Club domestic league appearances and goals as of 19 October 2025 ‡ National team caps and goals as of 20:30, 13 October 2025 (UTC)

Bakhtiyar Batyrzhanuly Zaynutdinov (Kazakh: Бақтияр Батыржанұлы Зайнутдинов; born 2 April 1998) is a Kazakh professional footballer who plays as a centre-back for Russian Premier League club Dynamo Moscow and the Kazakhstan national team. Known for his versatility, he mainly plays as a left-sided winger or full-back alongside a host of other positions.

He is Kazakhstan's all-time top goalscorer.

== Club career ==
On 25 November 2017, FC Astana announced the signing of Zaynutdinov. On 4 October 2018, in a 2017–18 UEFA Europa League group stage game against Rennes, he scored his first continental goal, becoming at 20 years and 6 months the youngest Kazakh goalscorer in an UEFA club competition final stage game.

On 12 January 2019, Zaynutdinov signed for Rostov. On 8 December 2019, he scored twice in a 4–1 away victory over FC Spartak Moscow.

On 25 August 2020, he signed a five-year contract with CSKA Moscow.

On 21 August 2023, he signed a four-year contract with Süper Lig club Beşiktaş. Three days later, on 24 August 2024, he played his first game and scored his first and only goal with Beşiktaş in the first leg of the 2023–24 UEFA Europa Conference League play-off round, an away game against Dynamo Kiev, (Note: game relocated in Bucharest due to the Russian invasion of Ukraine) as the Turkish side won the game 3–2. It was his second continental goal and his first in UEFA Conference League.

On 31 January 2025, he got severely injured at his hamstring and was sidelined for the rest of the season.

On 28 July 2025, Zaynutdinov signed a four-year contract with Dynamo Moscow.

== Career statistics ==
=== Club ===
As of match played 19 October 2025

Appearances and goals by club, season and competition
Club	Season	League			National cup (Note: Includes Kazakhstan Cup, Russian Cup, Turkish Cup)		Continental		Other		Total	
Club	Season	Division	Apps	Goals	Apps	Goals	Apps	Goals	Apps	Goals	Apps	Goals
Taraz	2015	Kazakhstan Premier League	0	0	0	0	–		–		0	0
Taraz	2016	Kazakhstan Premier League	0	0	0	0	–		–		0	0
Taraz	2017	Kazakhstan Premier League	27	7	1	0	–		–		28	7
Taraz	Total		27	7	1	0	–		–		28	7
Astana	2018	Kazakhstan Premier League	27	5	0	0	8 (Note: Two appearances in UEFA Champions League, six appearances and one goal in UEFA Europa League)	1	0	0	35	6
Rostov	2018–19	Russian Premier League	10	0	2	0	–		–		12	0
Rostov	2019–20	Russian Premier League	17	4	2	0	–		–		19	4
Rostov	2020–21	Russian Premier League	4	0	0	0	–		–		4	0
Rostov	Total		31	4	4	0	–		–		35	4
CSKA Moscow	2020–21	Russian Premier League	18	1	1	0	6 (Note: Appearances in UEFA Europa League)	0	–		25	1
CSKA Moscow	2021–22	Russian Premier League	22	3	4	1	–		–		26	4
CSKA Moscow	2022–23	Russian Premier League	21	1	6	0	–		–		27	1
CSKA Moscow	2023–24	Russian Premier League	3	0	1	1	–		1 (Note: Appearance in Russian Super Cup)	0	5	1
CSKA Moscow	Total		64	5	12	2	6	0	1	0	83	7
Beşiktaş	2023–24	Süper Lig	27	0	3	0	7 (Note: Appearances in UEFA Europa Conference League)	1	–		37	1
Beşiktaş	2024–25	Süper Lig	9	0	1	0	2	0	–		12	0
Beşiktaş	Total		36	0	4	0	9	1	–		49	1
Dynamo Moscow	2025–26	Russian Premier League	8	0	2	0	–		–		10	0
Career total			193	21	23	2	23	2	1	0	240	25

=== International ===
As of match played 13 October 2025

Appearances and goals by national team and year
National team	Year	Apps	Goals
Kazakhstan	2018	9	3
Kazakhstan	2019	4	3
Kazakhstan	2020	3	1
Kazakhstan	2021	5	2
Kazakhstan	2022	5	1
Kazakhstan	2023	8	4
Kazakhstan	2024	8	0
Kazakhstan	2025	2	1
Total		44	15

Scores and results list Kazakhstan's goal tally first.

List of international goals scored by Baktiyor Zaynutdinov
No.	Date	Venue	Opponent	Score	Result	Competition
1.	23 March 2018	Groupama Arena, Budapest, Hungary	Hungary	2–0	3–2	Friendly
2.	5 June 2018	Astana Arena, Astana, Kazakhstan	Azerbaijan	3–0	3–0	Friendly
3.	13 October 2018	Daugava Stadium, Riga, Latvia	Latvia	1–0	1–1	2018–19 UEFA Nations League D
4.	21 March 2019	Astana Arena, Astana, Kazakhstan	Scotland	3–0	3–0	UEFA Euro 2020 qualification
5.	16 November 2019	Stadio Olimpico di Serravalle, Serravalle, San Marino	San Marino	1–0	3–1	UEFA Euro 2020 qualification
6.	19 November 2019	Hampden Park, Glasgow, Scotland	Scotland	1–0	1–3	UEFA Euro 2020 qualification
7.	4 September 2020	LFF Stadium, Vilnius, Lithuania	Lithuania	1–0	2–0	2020–21 UEFA Nations League C
8.	7 September 2021	Bilino Polje, Zenica, Bosnia and Herzegovina	Bosnia and Herzegovina	2–2	2–2	2022 FIFA World Cup qualification
9.	16 November 2021	Astana Arena, Nur-Sultan, Kazakhstan	Tajikistan	1–0	1–0	Friendly
10.	22 September 2022	Astana Arena, Astana, Kazakhstan	Belarus	2–1	2–1	2022–23 UEFA Nations League C
11.	26 March 2023	Astana Arena, Astana, Kazakhstan	Denmark	1–2	3–2	UEFA Euro 2024 qualification
12.	16 June 2023	Stadio Ennio Tardini, Parma, Italy	San Marino	3–0	3–0	UEFA Euro 2024 qualification
13.	17 October 2023	Helsinki Olympic Stadium, Helsinki, Finland	Finland	1–1	2–1	UEFA Euro 2024 qualification
14.	17 October 2023	Helsinki Olympic Stadium, Helsinki, Finland	Finland	2–1	2–1	UEFA Euro 2024 qualification
15.	10 October 2025	Astana Arena, Astana, Kazakhstan	Liechtenstein	2–0	4–0	2026 FIFA World Cup qualification

== Honours ==
Astana

- Kazakhstan Premier League: 2018
- Kazakhstan Super Cup: 2018

CSKA Moscow

- Russian Cup: 2022–23

Beşiktaş

- Turkish Cup: 2023–24
- Turkish Super Cup: 2024
