= Maksym Feshchuk =

Ukrainian footballer

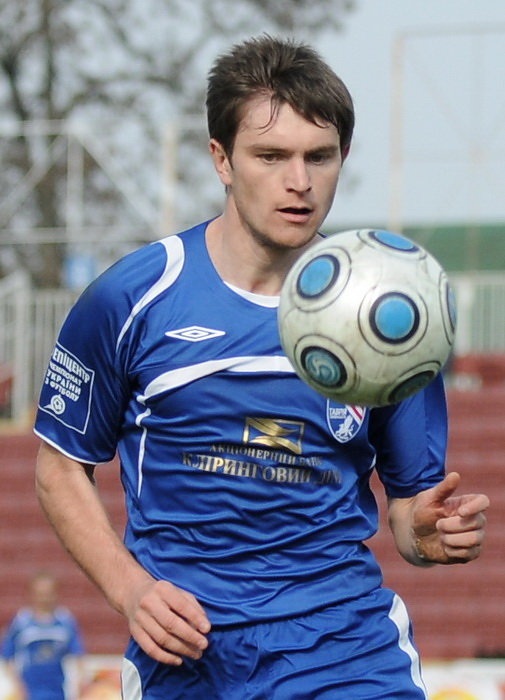

Personal information
- Full name: Maksym Ihorovych Feshchuk
- Date of birth: 25 November 1985 (age 40)
- Place of birth: Brody, Soviet Union (now Ukraine)
- Height: 1.83 m (6 ft 0 in)
- Position: Forward

Team information
- Current team: Feniks Pidmonastyr (manager)

Youth career
- 1999–2002: UFK Lviv

Senior career*
Years	Team	Apps	(Gls)
2002–2008	Karpaty Lviv	54	(6)
2002–2004	→ Karpaty-2 Lviv	30	(7)
2003–2004	→ Halychyna-Karpaty	29	(4)
2009–2013	Tavriya Simferopol	117	(23)
2014–2015	Hoverla Uzhhorod	33	(5)
2015–2016	Shakhter Karagandy	11	(3)
2016–2017	Dacia Chișinău	23	(12)
2017	Taraz	29	(4)
2018	Arsenal Kyiv	15	(2)
2019	Vitebsk	11	(1)
2020	Kolos Buchach (amateurs)	5	(4)
2020–2024	Feniks Pidmonastyr (amateurs)	120	(35)

International career
2005	Ukraine U19	4	(1)
2005–2006	Ukraine U21	15	(5)

Managerial career
- 2023–2024: Sich Dobriany (amateurs)
- 2024–: Feniks Pidmonastyr (amateurs)
- 2025–: FSC Mariupol
Medal record
Men's football
Representing Ukraine
UEFA European Under-21 Championship
Runner-up	2006 Portugal
- * Club domestic league appearances and goals as of 31 December 2024

Maksym Ihorovych Feshchuk (Ukrainian: Максим Ігорович Фещук; born on 25 November 1985) is a Ukrainian football coach and former professional player (forward) who is the manager of Feniks Pidmonastyr.

== Career ==
Feshchuk is a native of Brody, a city at north eastern edge of Lviv Oblast. He started out by playing at the Youth Football League (DYuFL) for the College of Physical Culture (UFK) in Lviv. After couple of years, Feshchuk joined the football heavy-weight of West Ukraine Karpaty Lviv.

He is participant of the 2005 FIFA World Youth Championship where playing three games he scored a goal against the national team of Panama in a group stage. Ukraine however was eliminated at the start of knock out rounds by Nigeria.

== Honours ==
Karpaty Lviv

- Ukrainian First League: runner-up 2006

Tavriya Simferopol

- Ukrainian Cup: winner 2009

Ukraine under-21

- UEFA Under-21 Championship: runner-up 2006
