= Igor Gubanov =

Russian footballer

Personal information
- Full name: Igor Igorevich Gubanov
- Date of birth: 4 February 1992 (age 34)
- Place of birth: Rostov-on-Don, Russia
- Height: 1.85 m (6 ft 1 in)
- Position: Centre back

Team information
- Current team: Bishkek City
- Number: 66

Youth career
- 2008–2009: RO UOR Rostov-on-Don

Senior career*
Years	Team	Apps	(Gls)
2009	MITOS-ROUOR Novocherkassk		
2010–2013	Rostov	0	(0)
2013–2014	→ SKVO Rostov-on-Don (loan)	25	(2)
2014–2015	→ MITOS Novocherkassk (loan)	28	(1)
2015	Sibir Novosibirsk	0	(0)
2015	→ Sibir-2 Novosibirsk	16	(0)
2016–2017	Zenit Izhevsk	31	(3)
2017–2018	Chayka Peschanokopskoye	29	(3)
2018–2019	Torpedo Minsk	22	(0)
2019	Slutsk	9	(0)
2020	Kyzylzhar	10	(0)
2021	Aktobe	5	(0)
2021–2021	SKA Rostov-on-Don	4	(0)
2022	Kyran	21	(2)
2023	Dordoi Bishkek	19	(0)
2024	Muras United	4	(0)
2025–	Bishkek City		
- * Club domestic league appearances and goals as of 31 December 2024

Igor Igorevich Gubanov (Russian: Игорь Игоревич Губанов; born 4 February 1992) is a Russian football player who plays as a defender for Bishkek City.

== Club career ==
He made his professional debut in the Russian Professional Football League for FC SKVO Rostov-on-Don on 22 August 2013 in a game against FC MITOS Novocherkassk.

In March 2023, Gubanov signed for Kyrgyz Premier League club Dordoi Bishkek.
