= Mohammed Diarra =

Guinean footballer (born 1992)

Mohamed Diarra
Personal information
- Full name: Mohamed Lamine Diarra
- Date of birth: 20 June 1992 (age 34)
- Place of birth: Conakry, Guinea
- Height: 1.82 m (5 ft 11 1/2 in)
- Position: Midfielder

Youth career
- Bondy

Senior career*
Years	Team	Apps	(Gls)
2009–2012	Paris Saint-Germain B	58	(5)
2012–2016	OB	46	(0)
2016	Nykøbing	2	(1)
2017	Altai Semey	0	(0)
2017	Taraz	31	(1)
2018	Vendsyssel	11	(0)
2018	Hvidovre	7	(0)

International career^{‡}
2013–2018	Guinea	10	(1)
- * Club domestic league appearances and goals as of 15:11, 30 July 2019 (UTC) ‡ National team caps and goals as of 1 October 2017

Mohamed Lamine Diarra (born 20 June 1992) is a Guinean professional footballer who plays as a defensive midfielder. He is a former Guinea international.

== Club career ==
Born in Conakry, Guinea, Diarra began his professional career at Paris Saint-Germain, signing in 2009 at the age of 16. He captained youth sides and the reserve team of the club before leaving for Danish Superliga team Odense on a four-year contract in 2012.

To take him through to the end of the 2016/17 season following his release from Odense, Diarra signed a short-term contract with Nykøbing on 4 October 2016 playing in the final two games of the season with the club.

On 1 February 2017, Diarra signed a one-year contract with Altai Semey in the Kazakhstan Premier League, however after Altai Semey were denied their place in the Kazakhstan Premier League, Diarra joined Taraz and completed the season in December making 31 league appearances for the club.

In March 2018 Diarra returned to Denmark to join superliga promotion hopefuls Vendsyssel. On 27 May 2018, Diarra helped Vendsyssel FF achieve promotion to the Danish superliga following their 3-1 aggregate play-off victory over Lyngby.

== Career statistics ==
=== Club ===
As of match played 27 May 2018

Appearances and goals by club, season and competition
Club	Season	League			Cup		Other		Total	
Club	Season	Division	Apps	Goals	Apps	Goals	Apps	Goals	Apps	Goals
Odense	2012–13	Superliga	7	0	1	0	—		8	0
Odense	2013–14	Superliga	27	0	1	0	—		28	0
Odense	2014–15	Superliga	5	0	0	0	—		5	0
Odense	2015–16	Superliga	5	0	0	0	—		5	0
Odense	Total	Superliga	44	0	2	0	—		46	0
Nykøbing	2016–17	1. Division	2	1	0	0	—		2	1
Taraz	2017	Premier League	31	1	0	0	—		31	1
Vendsyssel	2017–18	1. Division	9	0	0	0	2	0	11	0
Career total			86	2	2	0	2	0	90	2

=== International ===
Guinea national team
Year	Apps	Goals
2013	5	1
2014	2	0
2015	3	0
Total	10	1

Statistics accurate as of match played 12 October 2015

=== International goals ===
Scores and results list Guinea's goal tally first.

No	Date	Venue	Opponent	Score	Result	Competition
1.	9 June 2013	Stade du 28 Septembre, Conakry, Guinea	Mozambique	5–1	6–1	2014 FIFA World Cup qualification

== Honours ==
Paris Saint-Germain U19

- Championnat National U19: 2010–11
