= Maksim Zhitnev =

Russian footballer

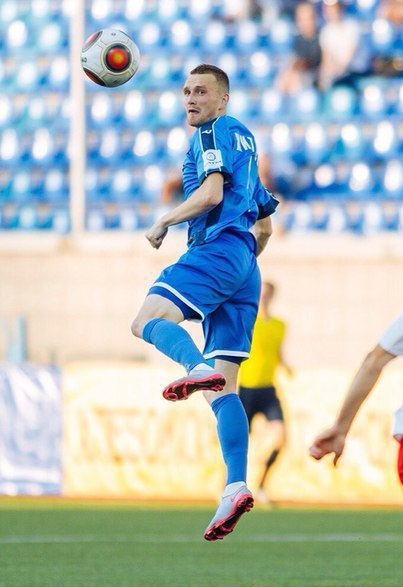
- Maksim Zhitnev in 2015

Personal information
- Full name: Maksim Igorevich Zhitnev
- Date of birth: 5 May 1990 (age 36)
- Place of birth: Belovo, Russian SFSR
- Height: 1.79 m (5 ft 10 in)
- Position: Striker

Team information
- Current team: Sibir Novosibirsk (breeding and analysis specialist)

Youth career
- Spartak Moscow

Senior career*
Years	Team	Apps	(Gls)
2007–2008	Spartak Moscow	0	(0)
2009	Shakhta Raspadskaya (amateur)		
2010–2011	Sibir-2 Novosibirsk	15	(9)
2011–2016	Sibir Novosibirsk	107	(32)
2016–2018	Kuban Krasnodar	20	(2)
2017–2018	→ Sibir Novosibirsk (loan)	31	(12)
2018–2019	Sibir Novosibirsk	26	(2)
2019	Tom Tomsk	17	(4)
2020	Irtysh Pavlodar	2	(0)
2020–2023	Novosibirsk	62	(33)
2023	Yelimay Semey	7	(4)
2023	Novosibirsk	7	(1)
2024	Maxline Vitebsk	9	(5)
2024	Naftan Novopolotsk	12	(3)
2025	Zhetysu	9	(1)
2026	Sibir Novosibirsk	3	(0)

Managerial career
- 2026–: Sibir Novosibirsk (breeding and analysis specialist)
- * Club domestic league appearances and goals

Maksim Igorevich Zhitnev (Russian: Максим Игоревич Житнев; born 5 May 1990) is a Russian football coach and former player who played as a second striker.

== Club career ==
He made his debut in the Russian Second Division for Sibir-2 Novosibirsk on 23 April 2011 in a game against Kuzbass Kemerovo.

He made his Russian Football National League debut for Sibir Novosibirsk on 9 August 2011 in a game against Torpedo Moscow.

He was called the player of the month in Football National League in July 2015.

On 29 January 2020, Irtysh Pavlodar announced the signing of Zhitnev.
