= Valeri Pochivalin =

Russian footballer

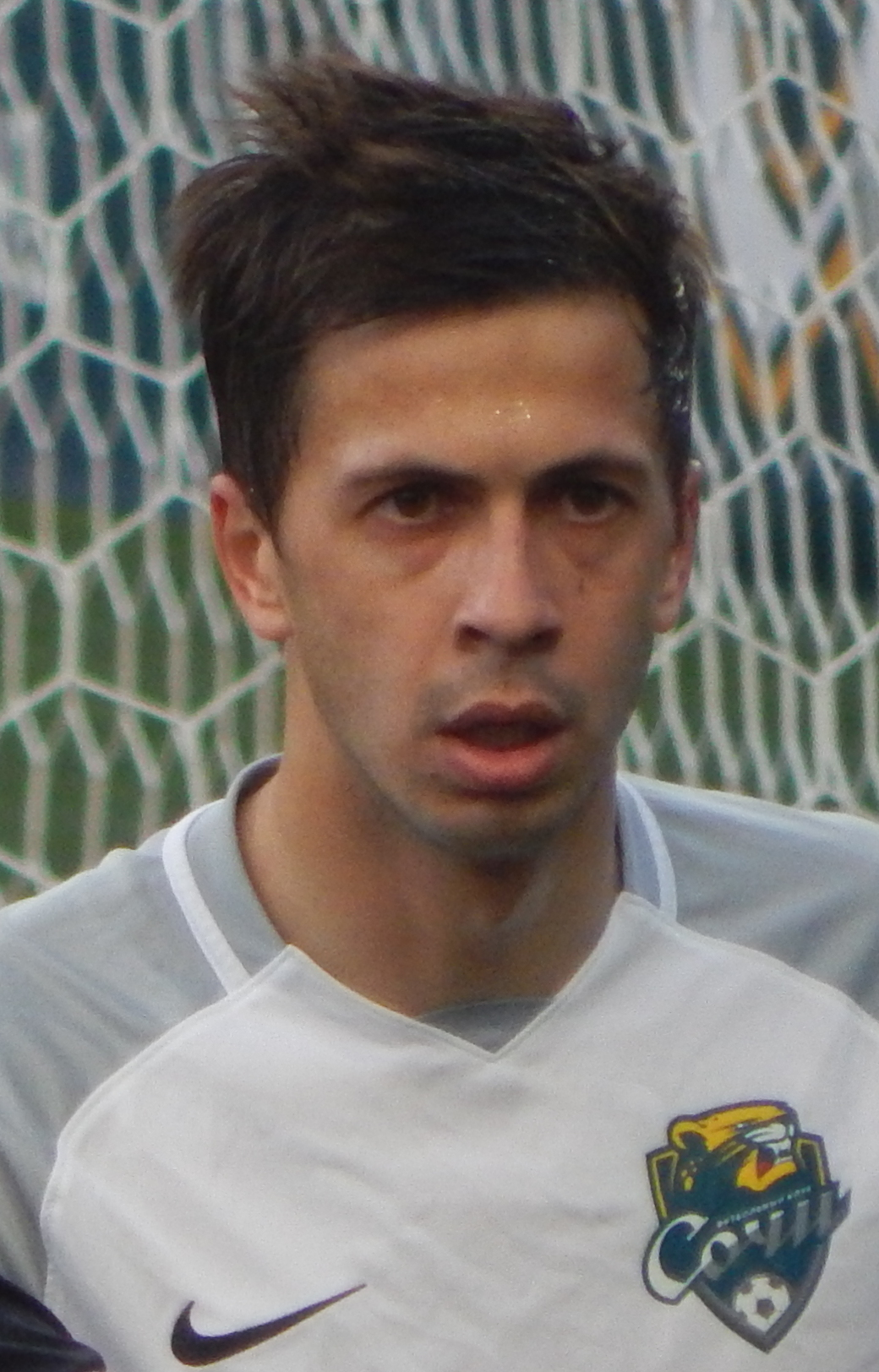

Personal information
- Full name: Valeri Eduardovich Pochivalin
- Date of birth: 11 April 1992 (age 34)
- Place of birth: Pavlovsk, Russia
- Height: 1.79 m (5 ft 10 in)
- Position: Defender

Team information
- Current team: Dynamo Vladivostok
- Number: 13

Youth career
- –2006: Granit Pavlovsk
- 2006–2010: UOR Master-Saturn Yegoryevsk
- 2010–2012: Krylia Sovetov
- 2014: Krylia Sovetov

Senior career*
| Years | Team | Apps | (Gls) |
| 2012 | Zvezda Ryazan | 10 | (1) |
| 2013 | Zenit Penza | 31 | (3) |
| 2014 | Krylia Sovetov | 0 | (0) |
| 2014–2015 | Syzran-2003 | 23 | (2) |
| 2015–2016 | Neftekhimik Nizhnekamsk | 25 | (1) |
| 2016–2018 | Baltika Kaliningrad | 36 | (2) |
| 2018–2019 | Sochi | 31 | (0) |
| 2019 | Khimki | 15 | (0) |
| 2020 | Irtysh Pavlodar | 1 | (0) |
| 2020 | Rotor Volgograd | 0 | (0) |
| 2020–2021 | Fakel Voronezh | 20 | (0) |
| 2021–2022 | Tom Tomsk | 34 | (0) |
| 2022–2023 | Veles Moscow | 26 | (0) |
| 2023–2025 | KAMAZ Naberezhnye Chelny | 57 | (1) |
| 2025– | Dynamo Vladivostok | 46 | (1) |
- * Club domestic league appearances and goals as of 15 November 2026

Valeri Eduardovich Pochivalin (Russian: Валерий Эдуардович Почивалин; born 11 April 1992) is a Russian football defender who plays for Dynamo Vladivostok.

== Club career ==
Pochivalin made his debut in the Russian Second Division for Zvezda Ryazan on 31 July 2012 in a game against Metallurg Lipetsk.

He made his Russian Football National League debut for Baltika Kaliningrad on 16 July 2016 in a game against Tyumen.

On 12 August 2019, Pochivalin signed with Khimki.

On 26 June 2020, he joined Russian Premier League club Rotor Volgograd. On 9 September 2020, his Rotor contract was cancelled by mutual consent before he made any appearances for the club. On 14 September 2020 he signed with Fakel Voronezh.
