= Syarhey Chernik =

Belarusian professional footballer

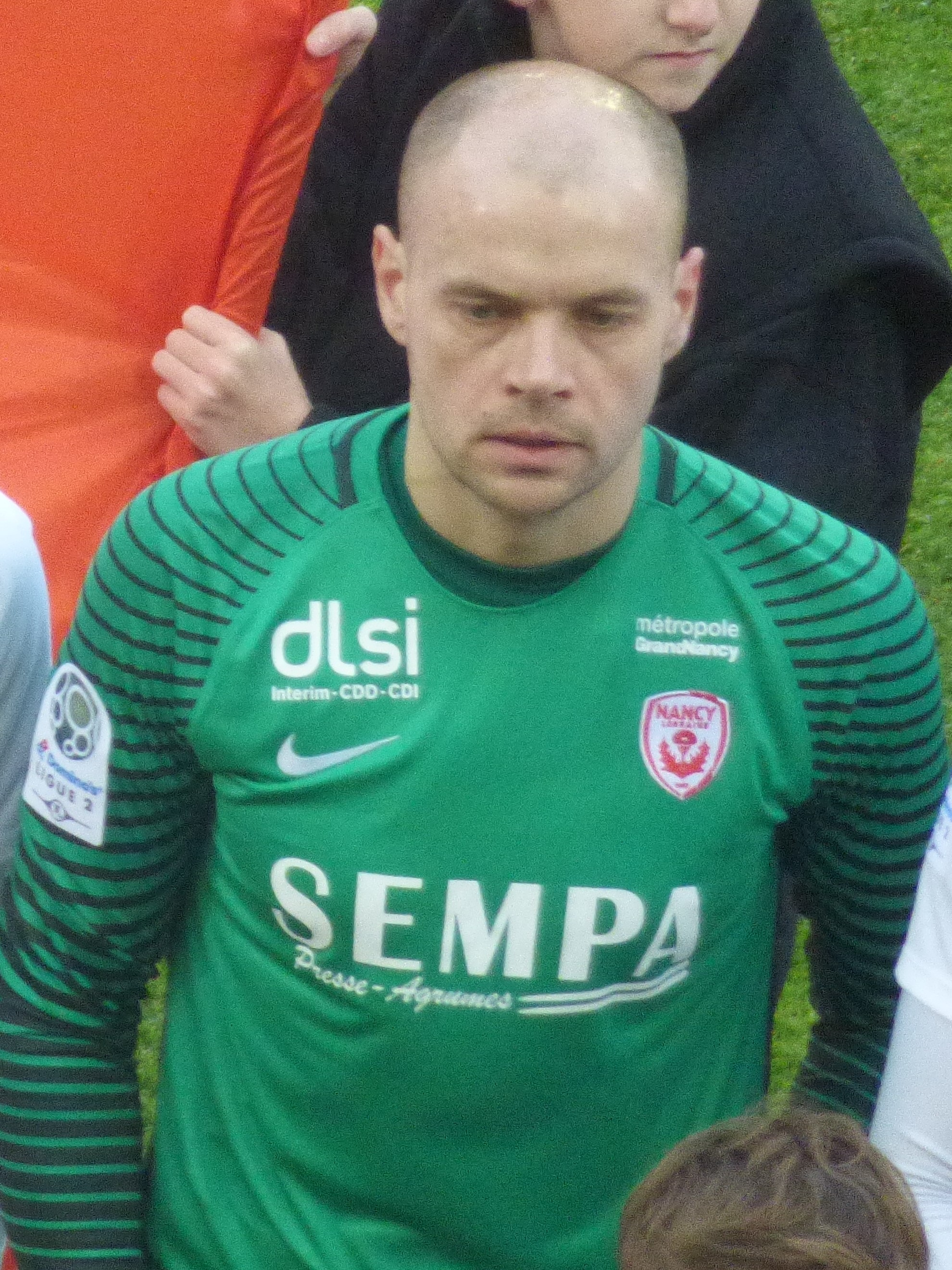
- Chernik in 2019

Personal information
- Date of birth: 20 July 1988 (age 38)
- Place of birth: Grodno, Belarusian SSR, Soviet Union
- Height: 1.87 m (6 ft 1 1/2 in)
- Position: Goalkeeper

Youth career
- 2005–2009: Neman Grodno

Senior career*
Years	Team	Apps	(Gls)
2010–2013	Neman Grodno	98	(0)
2014–2016	BATE Borisov	65	(0)
2016–2019	Nancy	44	(0)
2019	BATE Borisov	7	(0)
2020	Irtysh Pavlodar	2	(0)
2020	Gorodeya	5	(0)
2021–2024	Shakhtyor Soligorsk	55	(0)
2025	Slutsk	16	(0)
2026	BATE Borisov	4	(0)

International career^{‡}
2013–2021	Belarus	23	(0)
- * Club domestic league appearances and goals as of 25 August 2026 ‡ National team caps and goals as of 16 November 2021

Syarhey Chernik (Belarusian: Сяргей Чэрнік; Russian: Серге́й Черник; born 20 July 1988) is a Belarusian professional footballer.

== Career ==
Born in Grodno, Chernik began playing football in FC Neman Grodno's youth system. He joined the senior team and made his Belarusian Premier League debut in 2010. Chernik currently holds the Belarusian Premier League record for the number of consecutive minutes without conceding a goal (1073), which he set in June 2015.

Chernik made his debut for the Belarus national football team on 15 November 2013, in a match against Albania.

== Honours ==
BATE Borisov

- Belarusian Premier League champion: 2014, 2015, 2016
- Belarusian Cup winner: 2014–15, 2019–20
- Belarusian Super Cup winner: 2015, 2016

Shakhtyor Soligorsk

- Belarusian Premier League champion: 2021
- Belarusian Super Cup winner: 2021, 2023
