= Marko Tomić =

Serbian footballer

Personal information
- Full name: Marko Tomić
- Date of birth: 28 October 1991 (age 35)
- Place of birth: Priština, SFR Yugoslavia
- Height: 1.86 m (6 ft 1 in)
- Positions: Defensive midfielder; defender

Youth career
- Jastrebac Niš
- Radnički Niš

Senior career*
Years	Team	Apps	(Gls)
2009–2011	Radnički Niš	2	(0)
2011–2012	Radnik Surdulica	18	(0)
2012–2013	Sinđelić Niš	26	(1)
2013	FC Staad		
2014	Sinđelić Niš	14	(1)
2014–2016	Radnički Niš	38	(1)
2016	Čukarički	16	(1)
2017–2018	Radnički Niš	16	(0)
2018–2019	Žalgiris	50	(7)
2020	Irtysh Pavlodar	2	(0)
2020–2021	Alashkert	6	(0)
2021–2022	Napredak Kruševac	33	(1)
2023	Panevėžys	0	(0)
2023	Mladost Lučani	14	(0)
2024	Dubočica		
2024–2025	Radnik Surdulica		
- * Club domestic league appearances and goals as of 27 December 2023

Marko Tomić (Serbian Cyrillic: Марко Томић; born 28 October 1991) is a Serbian professional footballer who plays as a midfielder.

== Career ==
=== Žalgiris ===
He played for Lithuanian Žalgiris in the 2018 and 2019 seasons. In A lyga 2018 he scored six goals (played 29 matches) and in A lyga 2019 one goal (21 matches).

=== Irtysh Pavlodar ===
On 15 January 2020, Irtysh Pavlodar announced the signing of Tomić.

== Honours ==
Individual

- A Lyga Team of the Year: 2018
