= Pablo Podio =

Argentine footballer

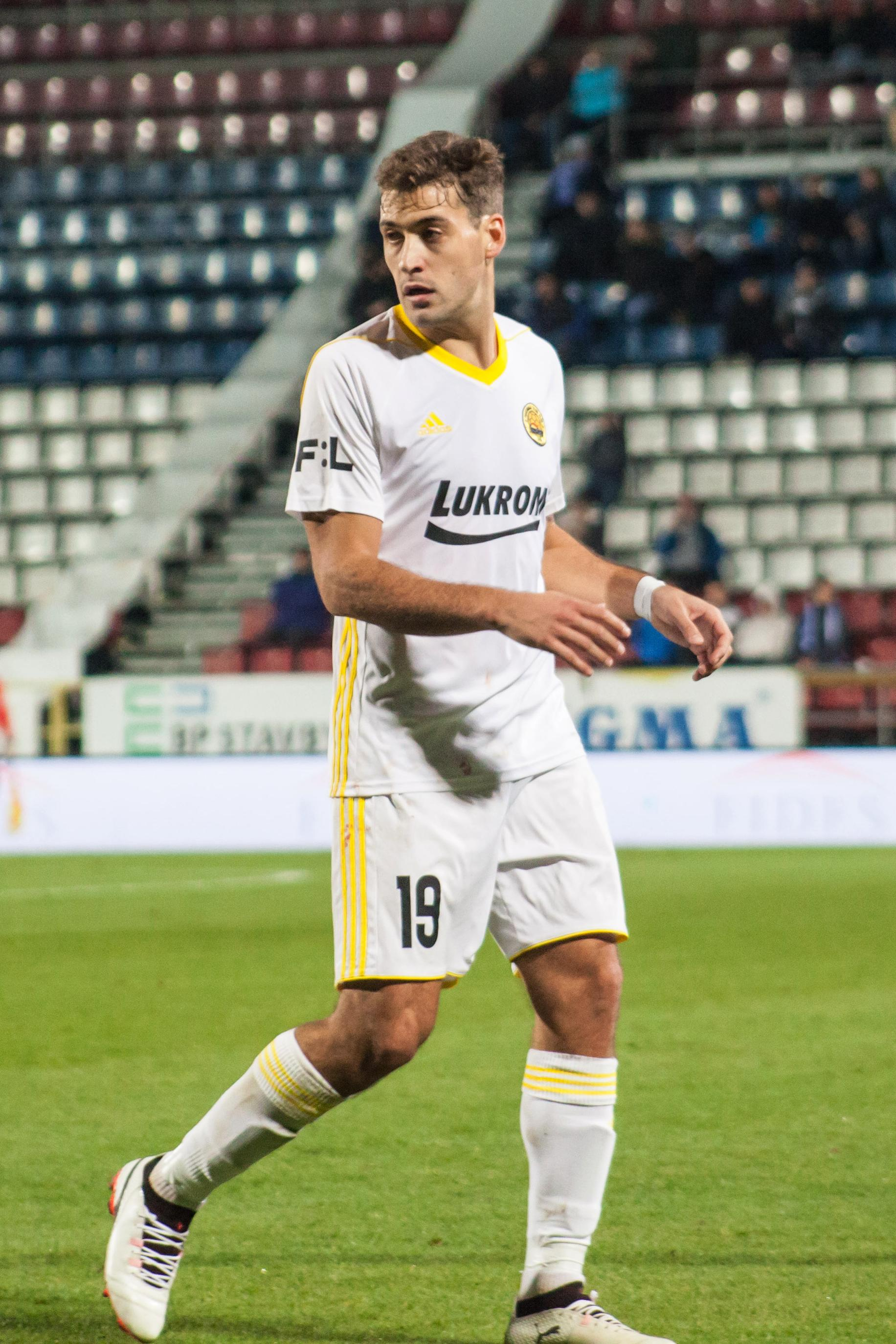
- Pablo Podio with Fastav Zlín

Personal information
- Full name: Pablo Joaquin Podio
- Date of birth: 7 August 1989 (age 37)
- Place of birth: La Playosa, Argentina
- Height: 1.82 m (6 ft 0 in)
- Position: Midfielder

Youth career
- –2008: Playosa SC

Senior career*
Years	Team	Apps	(Gls)
2008–2017	ŽP Šport Podbrezová	115	(15)
2017–2019	Fastav Zlín	43	(2)
2018	→ Keşla (loan)	2	(0)
2020	Irtysh Pavlodar	2	(0)
2020–2023	Kyzylzhar	78	(2)
- * Club domestic league appearances and goals as of 20 November 2023

Pablo Joaquin Podio (born 7 August 1989) is an Argentine professional footballer who plays as a midfielder.

== Club career ==
=== ŽP Šport Podbrezová ===
After beginning his career with F.C. PSC La Playosa, Podio moved to Europe in 2008 to play for ŽP Šport Podbrezová as part of the Inter Campus project. He played there until 2017. He made his Fortuna Liga debut for Podbrezová against Slovan Bratislava on 11 July 2014. He had debuted in the starting-XI and was booked with a late yellow card. Podbrezová had lost at Pasienky 2:1 after two goals by Marko Milinković.

=== Keşla (loan) ===
On 17 January 2018, Keşla announced the signing of Podio until the end of the 2017–18 season.

=== Irtysh Pavlodar ===
On 11 January 2020, Irtysh Pavlodar announced the signing of Podio.

== Personal life ==
He also possesses Slovak citizenship.
