= Andrei Khripkov =

Russian footballer

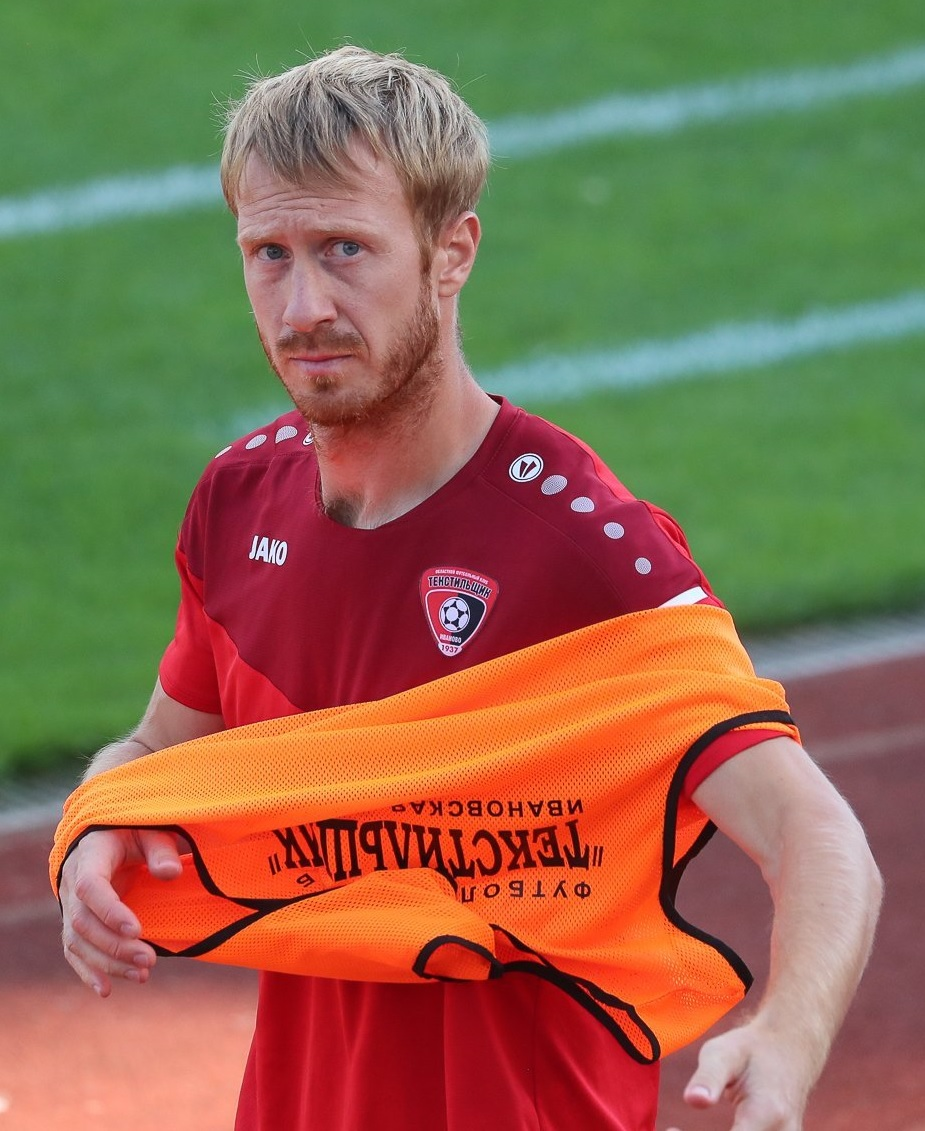
- Khripkov with Tekstilshchik Ivanovo in 2021

Personal information
- Full name: Andrei Valentinovich Khripkov
- Date of birth: 30 June 1990 (age 36)
- Place of birth: Frunze, Kyrgyz SSR
- Height: 1.87 m (6 ft 2 in)
- Positions: Defender; midfielder

Senior career*
Years	Team	Apps	(Gls)
2007	Dynamo Moscow	0	(0)
2008–2009	Zimbru Chişinău	1	(0)
2010	Volga-d Nizhny Novgorod (amateur)		
2010–2014	Tekstilshchik Ivanovo	73	(3)
2014–2015	KAMAZ	18	(1)
2015–2019	Nizhny Novgorod	112	(6)
2019	Mordovia Saransk	21	(0)
2020	Irtysh Pavlodar	2	(0)
2020	Sokol Saratov	14	(0)
2021–2022	Tekstilshchik Ivanovo	48	(0)
2022	Mashuk-KMV	17	(0)
2023	Dordoi Bishkek	4	(0)
- * Club domestic league appearances and goals

Andrei Valentinovich Khripkov (Russian: Андрей Валентинович Хрипков; born 30 June 1990) is a Russian former professional football player.

== Club career ==
He made his Russian Football National League debut for FC Olimpiyets Nizhny Novgorod on 8 July 2017 in a game against FC Avangard Kursk.

On 14 January 2023, Dordoi Bishkek announced the signing of Khripkov to a one-year contract.
