= Timur Bayzhanov =

Kazakhstani association football player

Personal information
- Full name: Timur Rashiduly Bayzhanov
- Date of birth: 30 March 1990 (age 36)
- Place of birth: Pavlodar, Kazakh SSR
- Height: 1.80 m (5 ft 11 in)
- Position: Forward

Team information
- Current team: Aksu

Senior career*
Years	Team	Apps	(Gls)
2008–2012	Irtysh Pavlodar	6	(0)
2010	→ Ak Bulak (loan)	16	(0)
2011	→ Kazakhmys (loan)	6	(1)
2011	→ Kaisar (loan)	11	(1)
2013	Kairat	13	(3)
2014	Irtysh Pavlodar	1	(0)
2014	Ekibastuz	11	(4)
2015	Spartak Semey	21	(2)
2016	Kyzylzhar	15	(0)
2017–2018	Taraz	31	(4)
2018–2019	Okzhetpes	9	(0)
2020	Irtysh Pavlodar	2	(0)
2020–2021	Tyumen	0	(0)
2022–	Aksu	0	(0)

International career^{‡}
2013	Kazakhstan	1	(0)
- * Club domestic league appearances and goals as of 1 August 2022 ‡ National team caps and goals as of 6 April 2018

Timur Rashiduly Bayzhanov (Kazakh: Тимур Рашидұлы Байжанов; born 30 March 1990) is a Kazakh footballer who plays as a forward for Aksu.

== Career statistics ==
=== International ===
As of match played 6 February 2013

Kazakhstan national team
Year	Apps	Goals
2013	1	0
Total	1	0
