= 2024 FC Aktobe season =

FC Aktobe
2024 season
- Chairman: Askar Zhyrgalbekov
- Manager: Dmytro Parfyonov (until 31 August); Ihor Leonov (from 6 September)
- Stadium: Central Stadium
- Premier League: 3rd
- Kazakhstan Cup: Champions
- League Cup: Group stage
- Europa Conference League: First qualifying round vs Sarajevo
- Top goalscorer: League: Idris Umayev (6); All: Maksim Samorodov (8)
- Highest home attendance: 12,600 vs Astana (4 May 2024)
- Lowest home attendance: 3,000 vs Zhenis (31 March 2024)
- Average home league attendance: 10,442 (10 November 2024)

The 2024 FC Aktobe season was the 4th successive season that Aktobe will play in the Kazakhstan Premier League, the highest tier of association football in Kazakhstan, since their promotion back to the top flight in 2020. Aktobe finished the season in 3rd place for the second season in a row, were knocked out of the League Cup at the Group Stage, won the Kazakhstan Cup and were knocked out of the Europa Conference League by Sarajevo in the first qualifying round.

== Season events ==
On 20 December 2023, Aktobe announcedwasthe signing of Bagdat Kairov from Tobol.

On 16 January, Aktobe announced the singing of Ramazan Orazov from Koper.

On 23 January, Aktobe announced the singing of Gaby Kiki from Sheriff Tiraspol.

On 8 February, Aktobe announced the singing of José Cevallos from Emelec.

On 10 February, Aktobe announced the singing of Mateo Barać from Krylia Sovetov, and the signing Uche Agbo from Slovan Bratislava.

On 18 February, Aktobe announced the singing of Jayro Jean from Always Ready.

On 24 February, Aktobe announced the singing of Bogdan Vătăjelu from Universitatea Cluj.

On 25 February, Aktobe announced the singing of Idris Umayev from Akhmat Grozny.

On 26 February, Aktobe announced the singing of Amadou Doumbouya from Botev Plovdiv.

On 13 March, Aktobe announced the singing of Dorny Romero from Always Ready to a three-year contract.

On 13 June, Ramazan Orazov left Aktobe to sign for Silkeborg.

On 5 August, Maksim Samorodov left Aktobe to sign for Akhmat Grozny.

On 8 August, Aktobe announced the singing of Freddy Góndola from Maccabi Bnei Reineh.

On 1 September, Aktobe announced the departure of Dmytro Parfyonov as their head coach, with Ihor Leonov being appointed as his replacement on 6 September.

== Squad ==
As of match played 10 November 2024

No.	Name	Nationality	Position	Date of birth (age)	Signed from	Signed in	Contract ends	Apps.	Goals
Goalkeepers
1	Igor Trofimets	(Kazakhstan)	GK	20 August 1996 (aged 28)	Aksu	2016		41	0
25	Evgeniy Sitdikov	(Kazakhstan)	GK	25 June 2001 (aged 23)	Unattached	2024		3	0
30	Igor Shatsky	(Kazakhstan)	GK	28 February 1998 (aged 26)	Shakhter Karagandy	2024		28	0
Defenders
6	Alibek Kasym	(Kazakhstan)	DF	27 May 1998 (aged 26)	Kyzylzhar	2022		84	18
15	Gaby Kiki	(Cameroon)	DF	15 February 1995 (aged 29)	Sheriff Tiraspol	2024		25	0
24	Bagdat Kairov	(Kazakhstan)	DF	27 April 1993 (aged 31)	Tobol	2024		125	2
31	Adilkhan Tanzharikov	(Kazakhstan)	DF	25 November 1996 (aged 27)	Academy	2018			
44	Mateo Barać	(Croatia)	DF	20 July 1994 (aged 30)	Krylia Sovetov	2024		24	1
88	Bogdan Vătăjelu	(Romania)	DF	24 April 1993 (aged 31)	Universitatea Cluj	2024		33	1
Midfielders
3	Dmitry Bessmertny	(Belarus)	MF	3 January 1997 (aged 27)	BATE Borisov	2023		37	1
4	Uche Agbo	(Nigeria)	MF	4 December 1995 (aged 28)	Slovan Bratislava	2024		28	3
5	Leonel Strumia	(Argentina)	MF	29 September 1992 (aged 32)	Liepāja	2023		58	0
16	José Cevallos	(Ecuador)	MF	18 January 1995 (aged 29)	Emelec	2024		25	4
18	Jayro Jean	(Haiti)	MF	22 June 1998 (aged 26)	Always Ready	2024		31	6
42	Ayan Baydavletov	(Kazakhstan)	MF	3 May 2006 (aged 18)	Academy	2024		2	0
48	Alisher Kenzhegulov	(Kazakhstan)	MF	28 October 2005 (aged 19)	Academy	2024		3	0
57	Miras Umaniyazov	(Kazakhstan)	MF	8 September 2006 (aged 18)	Academy	2024		4	0
80	Arman Kenesov	(Kazakhstan)	MF	4 September 2000 (aged 24)	SKA-Khabarovsk	2022		81	11
Forwards
9	Abylaykhan Zhumabek	(Kazakhstan)	FW	19 October 2001 (aged 23)	Taraz	2023		22	1
11	Idris Umayev	(Russia)	FW	15 January 1999 (aged 25)	Akhmat Grozny	2024		46	9
12	Amadou Doumbouya	(Guinea)	FW	12 October 2002 (aged 22)	Botev Plovdiv	2024		22	1
17	Dorny Romero	(Dominican Republic)	FW	24 January 1998 (aged 26)	Always Ready	2024	2026	31	7
99	Freddy Góndola	(Panama)	FW	18 September 1995 (aged 29)	Maccabi Bnei Reineh	2024	2026	9	3
Aktobe II Players
43	Didar Ongarbaev	(Kazakhstan)	MF	2 September 2004 (aged 20)	Academy	2024		1	0
49	Miram Kikbaev	(Kazakhstan)	MF	19 May 2006 (aged 18)	Academy	2024		1	0
58	Alimzhan Sagyntaev	(Kazakhstan)	DF	21 June 2004 (aged 20)	Academy	2024		1	0
59	Islam Abilkasov	(Kazakhstan)	MF	30 January 2004 (aged 20)	Academy	2024		1	0
62	Askerbek Baydalinov	(Kazakhstan)	DF	9 May 2005 (aged 19)	Academy	2024		1	0
63	Alim Abatay	(Kazakhstan)	MF	5 October 2003 (aged 21)	Academy	2024		1	0
67	Darkhan Berdibek	(Kazakhstan)	MF	31 May 2004 (aged 20)	Caspiy	2024		1	0
68	Doszhan Sabitov	(Kazakhstan)	DF	27 September 2003 (aged 21)	Academy	2024		1	0
71	Beybarys Imankul	(Kazakhstan)	MF	17 May 2003 (aged 21)	Academy	2024		1	0
73	Adilbek Begimov	(Kazakhstan)	FW	24 May 2007 (aged 17)	Academy	2024		1	0
78	Dias Ondasynov	(Kazakhstan)	DF	28 February 2003 (aged 21)	Academy	2024		1	0
79	Nurlybek Kashkankul	(Kazakhstan)	MF	1 January 2003 (aged 21)	Academy	2024		1	0
81	Beket Shamsheden	(Kazakhstan)	MF	11 October 2004 (aged 20)	Academy	2024		1	0
82	Azamat Zhumagaliev	(Kazakhstan)	DF	19 July 2006 (aged 18)	Academy	2024		1	0
83	Doszhan Arystanov	(Kazakhstan)	FW	7 January 2005 (aged 19)	Academy	2024		1	0
Players away on loan
Players that left during the season
2	Timur Rudoselsky	(Kazakhstan)	DF	21 December 1994 (aged 29)	Alashkert	2023		2	0
7	Bauyrzhan Baytana	(Kazakhstan)	MF	6 June 1992 (aged 32)	Taraz	2022		67	4
10	Maksim Samorodov	(Kazakhstan)	FW	29 June 2002 (aged 22)	Academy	2019			
20	Ramazan Orazov	(Kazakhstan)	MF	30 January 1998 (aged 26)	Koper	2024		51	0

== Transfers ==
=== In ===
Date	Position	Nationality	Name	From	Fee	Ref.
20 December 2023	DF	(Kazakhstan)	Bagdat Kairov	Tobol	Undisclosed	
16 January 2024	MF	(Kazakhstan)	Ramazan Orazov	Koper	Undisclosed	
23 January 2024	DF	(Cameroon)	Gaby Kiki	Sheriff Tiraspol	Undisclosed	
8 February 2024	MF	(Ecuador)	José Cevallos	Emelec	Undisclosed	
10 February 2024	MF	(Croatia)	Mateo Barać	Krylia Sovetov	Undisclosed	
10 February 2024	MF	(Nigeria)	Uche Agbo	Slovan Bratislava	Undisclosed	
18 February 2024	MF	(Haiti)	Jayro Jean	Always Ready	Undisclosed	
24 February 2024	DF	(Romania)	Bogdan Vătăjelu	Universitatea Cluj	Undisclosed	
25 February 2024	FW	(Russia)	Idris Umayev	Akhmat Grozny	Undisclosed	
26 February 2024	FW	(Guinea)	Amadou Doumbouya	Botev Plovdiv	Undisclosed	
13 March 2024	FW	(Dominican Republic)	Dorny Romero	Always Ready	Undisclosed	
8 August 2024	FW	(Panama)	Freddy Góndola	Maccabi Bnei Reineh	Undisclosed	

=== Out ===
Date	Position	Nationality	Name	To	Fee	Ref.
1 April 2024	DF	(Kazakhstan)	Timur Rudoselsky	Ekibastuz	Undisclosed	
13 June 2024	MF	(Kazakhstan)	Ramazan Orazov	Silkeborg	Undisclosed	
5 August 2024	FW	(Kazakhstan)	Maksim Samorodov	Akhmat Grozny	Undisclosed	

== Competitions ==
=== Overview ===
Competition	First match	Last match	Starting round	Final position	Record							
Competition	First match	Last match	Starting round	Final position	Pld	W	D	L	GF	GA	GD	Win %
Premier League	2 March 2024	10 November 2024	Matchday 1	3rd	24	12	7	5	39	26	+13	50.00
Kazakhstan Cup	14 April 2024	29 September 2024	Round of 16	Winners	5	4	0	1	8	4	+4	80.00
League Cup	25 May 2024	21 July 2024	Group stage	Group stage	3	2	0	1	4	3	+1	66.67
UEFA Conference League	11 July 2024	18 July 2024	First qualifying round	First qualifying round	2	1	0	1	3	3	+0	50.00
Total					34	19	7	8	54	36	+18	55.88

Last updated: 10 November 2024
Source: Competitions

=== Premier League ===
==== Results summary ====
Overall								Home						Away					
Pld	W	D	L	GF	GA	GD	Pts	W	D	L	GF	GA	GD	W	D	L	GF	GA	GD
24	12	7	5	39	26	+13	43	6	4	2	20	11	+9	6	3	3	19	15	+4

Last updated: 10 November 2024.
Source: See Results

==== Results by round ====
Round	1	2^{1}	3	4	5	6	7	8	9	10	11	12	13	15	16	14	17	18	19	20	21	22	23	24	25	26
Ground	A	-	H	H	A	A	H	A	H	A	A	H	H	H	A	A	H	A	H	H	A	H	-	A	A	H
Result	W	P	W	D	W	L	D	W	D	W	D	W	L	W	W	D	D	D	L	W	L	W	P	L	W	W
Position	2	6	3	4	1	1	2	1	1	1	1	2	2	2	1	1	2	2	2	1	3	2	4	4	3	3

Source: See Results
A = Away; H = Home; W = Win; D = Draw; L = Loss; P = Bye
Notes:
- ^{1} Aktobe had a bye during the second round of fixtures.

==== Results ====
1 March 2024 1	Kaisar	1–3	Aktobe	Kyzylorda
17:00 (UTC+5)	Baradzin (yellow card) 30'; Kalmuratov (yellow card) 42'; Zhangylyshbay (yellow card) 90+4'; Yudenkov 90+5'	Report	Umayev 24', 64'; Samorodov 55'; Kairov (yellow card) 90+4'	Stadium: Gani Muratbayev Stadium; Attendance: 4,000; Referee: Artem Kuchin

2	Bye
(UTC+5)

31 March 2024 3	Aktobe	3–0	Zhenis	Aktobe
14:00 (UTC+5)	Samorodov 13' (pen.); Umayev 16'; Romero 48'; Barać (yellow card) 51' (yellow-red card) 73'; Shatsky (yellow card) 90+2'; Kasym (yellow card) 90+3'	Report	Kenzhebek (yellow card) 30'; Hjertstrand (yellow card) 46'; Sovet (yellow card) 82'	Stadium: Central Stadium; Attendance: 3,000; Referee: Alexander Zatula

7 April 2024 4	Aktobe	1–1	Atyrau	Aktobe
14:00 (UTC+5)	Tanzharikov 10'; Orazov (yellow card) 33'	Report	Najaryan (yellow card) 29'; Zhagorov (yellow card) 45'; Signevich 68'; Zhumakhanov (yellow card) 83'	Stadium: Central Stadium; Attendance: 3,000; Referee: Denis Izmailov

20 April 2024 5	Kairat	1–3	Aktobe	Almaty
19:00 (UTC+5)	Gadrani (yellow card) 16'; Arad (yellow card) 45'; Seydakhmet (yellow card) 89'; Shvyryov 90+6'	Report	Kasym 40' (pen.); Baytana (yellow card) 45'; Umayev (yellow card) 45'; Samorodov (yellow card) 61' (goal) 68', 90+2'	Stadium: Central Stadium; Attendance: 22,804; Referee: Daniyar Sakhi

28 April 2024 6	Zhetysu	2–1	Aktobe	Taldykorgan
16:30 (UTC+5)	Shramchenko 19'; Mosiashvili (yellow card) 27'; Baltabekov 70'	Report	Strumia (yellow card) 37'; Barać 50'; Umayev (yellow card) 61'	Stadium: Zhetysu Stadium; Attendance: 3,800; Referee: Arman Ismuratov

4 May 2024 7	Aktobe	1–1	Astana	Aktobe
19:00 (UTC+5)	Kiki (yellow card) 56'; Umayev 77'; Barać (yellow card) 81'; Kenesov (yellow card) 90+5'	Report	Kuat 23' (red card) 43'	Stadium: Central Stadium; Attendance: 12,600; Referee: Grigory Moskovchenko

12 May 2024 8	Kyzylzhar	0–2	Aktobe	Petropavl
17:00 (UTC+5)	Brígido (yellow card) 34'; Sabino (yellow card) 77'	Report	Vătăjelu (yellow card) 26'; Baytana 62'; Cevallos 67'	Stadium: Karasai Stadium; Attendance: 4,000; Referee: Denis Izmailov

18 May 2024 9	Aktobe	0–0	Ordabasy	Aktobe
19:00 (UTC+5)	Kenesov (yellow card) 80'	Report	Islamkhan (yellow card) 66'	Stadium: Central Stadium; Attendance: 12,600; Referee: Baghdad Abdullayev

2 June 2024 10	Turan	0–1	Aktobe	Turkistan
19:00 (UTC+5)	Mawutor (yellow card) 48'; Nikolić (yellow card) 69'; Sokolenko (yellow card) 83'	Report	Jean 77'	Stadium: Turkistan Arena; Attendance: 275; Referee: Rustam Omarov

16 June 2024 11	Elimai	2–2	Aktobe	Semey
20:00 (UTC+5)	Korzun (yellow card) 45' (goal) 45+2'; David (yellow card) 60' (goal) 86'; Thioub (yellow card) 89'	Report	Jean 25'; Baytana (yellow card) 49'; Doumbouya (yellow card) 52'; Orazov (yellow card) 65'; Samorodov 78'	Stadium: Spartak Stadium; Attendance: 8,500; Referee: Sergey Nozhenko

23 June 2024 12	Aktobe	1–0	Shakhter Karagandy	Aktobe
20:00 (UTC+5)	Barać (yellow card) 53'; Romero 70'; Baytana (yellow card) 90+3'	Report	Stamenković (yellow card) 33'; Abdulla (yellow card) 42'; Tyulyubay (yellow card) 44'	Stadium: Central Stadium; Attendance: 12,400; Referee: Anton Kuchma

30 June 2024 13	Aktobe	3–4	Tobol	Aktobe
20:00 (UTC+5)	Kasym 52'; Romero 58' (pen.), 90+1'; Kenesov (yellow card) 75'; Strumia (yellow card) 76'; Vătăjelu (yellow card) 90+6'	Report	Chesnokov 16', 73' (yellow card) 50'; El Messaoudi 27'; Ivanović 45' (yellow card) 63'; Pokatilov (yellow card) 88'	Stadium: Central Stadium; Attendance: 12,400; Referee: Alexander Zatula

28 July 2024 15	Aktobe	2–0	Kyzylzhar	Aktobe
18:00 (UTC+5)	Agbo 34'; Cevallos (yellow card) 67'; Strumia (yellow card) 72'; Jean 76'	Report	Zhaksybaev (yellow card) 38'; Sabino (yellow card) 68'; Sebai (yellow card) 84'; Brígido (yellow card) 89'	Stadium: Central Stadium; Attendance: 12,400; Referee: Grigory Moskovchenko

4 August 2024 16	Zhenis	1–2	Aktobe	Astana
18:00 (UTC+5)	Bruno Silva 39'	Report	Agbo 27'; Kenesov (yellow card) 71'; Umayev 87'	Stadium: Kazhymukan Munaitpasov Stadium; Attendance: 500; Referee: Daniyar Sakhi

11 August 2024 14	Atyrau	1–1	Aktobe	Atyrau
18:00 (UTC+5)	Zhumakhanov (yellow card) 42'; Noyok 60'; Signevich (yellow card) 84'	Report	Barać (yellow card) 21'; Vătăjelu 33'; Agbo (yellow card) 67'; Shatsky (yellow card) 69'; Strumia (yellow card) 88'	Stadium: Munaishy Stadium; Attendance: 5,500; Referee: Sayat Karabaev
Note: Match originally scheduled for 14 July, but postponed due to Aktobe's participation in the 2024–25 UEFA Europa League.

18 August 2024 17	Aktobe	1–1	Kaisar	Aktobe
20:00 (UTC+5)	Kenesov 22'; Agbo (yellow card) 90+4'	Report	Sovpel (yellow card) 33'; Milojko 60'; Narzildayev (yellow card) 80'	Stadium: Central Stadium; Attendance: 12,400; Referee: Denis Tevyashov

25 August 2024 18	Ordabasy	1–1	Aktobe	Shymkent
20:00 (UTC+5)	Suyumbayev (yellow card) 28'; Astanov (yellow card) 63'; Umarov 72'	Report	Cevallos 14'; Kiki (yellow card) 62'; Strumia (yellow card) 77'; Kasym (yellow card) 82'	Stadium: Kazhymukan Munaitpasov Stadium; Attendance: 12,000; Referee: Bagdat Abdullayev

31 August 2024 19	Aktobe	1–3	Elimai	Aktobe
20:00 (UTC+5)	Kasym 3' (pen.) (yellow card) 31'; Romero (yellow card) 18'; Vătăjelu (yellow card) 24'	Report	Odeyobo 31'; Korzun (yellow card) 40'; Penchikov (yellow card) 41'; Darabayev 53' (yellow card) 72'; Pertsukh (yellow card) 90'; Murtazayev 90+4'	Stadium: Central Stadium; Attendance: 12,600; Referee: Sayat Karabaev

15 September 2024 20	Aktobe	3–0	Zhetysu	Aktobe
19:00 (UTC+5)	Góndola 36'; Tanzharikov (yellow card) 40'; Jean 44'; Doumbouya (yellow card) 49'; Kairov (yellow card) 59'; Kasym (yellow card) 75'	Report	Chaduneli (yellow card) 66'; Baltabekov (yellow card) 90+2'	Stadium: Central Stadium; Attendance: 12,200; Referee: Alexander Zatula

22 September 2024 21	Tobol	3–0	Aktobe	Kostanay
19:00 (UTC+5)	Chesnokov 32'; Asrankulov (yellow card) 38'; Mosiashvili (yellow card) 51'; Gabarayev (yellow card) 63'; El Messaoudi 65'; Costa 86'	Report	Agbo (yellow card) 26' (yellow-red card) 44'; Kairov (yellow card) 80'	Stadium: Central Stadium; Attendance: 4,100; Referee: Denis Izmailov

4 October 2024 22	Aktobe	2–1	Kairat	Aktobe
16:00 (UTC+5)	Romero (yellow card) 24'; Jean (yellow card) 34'; Umayev (yellow card) 59' (goal) 89'; Góndola (yellow card) 59' (goal) 82'; Kasym (yellow card) 71'; Kairov (yellow card) 90+4'	Report	Gromyko 51'; Yuldoshev (yellow card) 59'; Martynovich (yellow card) 59'; Arad (yellow card) 69'; Zaria (yellow card) 75'; Shvyryov (yellow card) 90+4'	Stadium: Central Stadium; Attendance: 12,400; Referee: Sayat Karabaev

23	Bye
(UTC+5)

27 October 2024 24	Astana	2–0	Aktobe	Almaty
16:00 (UTC+5)	Camara 8'; Gripshi 17'; Vorogovsky (yellow card) 26'	Report	Strumia (yellow card) 59'; Romero (yellow card) 90+5'	Stadium: Khan Taniri Stadium; Referee: Alexander Zatula

3 November 2024 25	Shakhter Karagandy	1–3	Aktobe	Karaganda
14:00 (UTC+5)	Abdulla (yellow card) 17'; Ashortia 52'; Zubaydilda (yellow card) 59'; Kozlov (yellow card) 90'; Kybyray (yellow card) 90+3'	Report	Kairov (yellow card) 17'; Doumbouya 22' (yellow card) 34'; Kenesov 55', 60' (yellow card) 69'; Tanzharikov (yellow card) 83'	Stadium: Shakhter Stadium; Attendance: 2,000; Referee: Elvira Nurmustafina

10 November 2024 26	Aktobe	2–0	Turan	Aktobe
14:00 (UTC+5)	Tanzharikov (yellow card) 11'; Kairov (yellow card) 30'; Agbo 36'; Romero 90+5'	Report	Arkhipov (yellow card) 80'	Stadium: Central Stadium; Attendance: 7,300; Referee: Bulat Sariev

==== League table ====
Pos	Team	Pld	W	D	L	GF	GA	GD	Pts	Qualification or relegation
1	Kairat (C)	24	14	5	5	39	21	+18	47	Qualification for the Champions League first qualifying round
2	Astana	24	14	4	6	39	19	+20	46	Qualification for the Conference League second qualifying round
3	Aktobe (W)	24	12	7	5	39	26	+13	43	Qualification for the Europa League first qualifying round (Note: Aktobe qualified for the Europa League first qualifying round by winning the 2024 Kazakhstan Cup.)
4	Ordabasy	24	12	6	6	36	24	+12	42	Qualification for the Conference League first qualifying round
5	Tobol	24	11	6	7	33	23	+10	39	

Source: UEFA, Soccerway, QFL
Rules for classification: 1) Points; 2) Goal difference; 3) Matches won; 4) Goals scored; 5) Away goals scored; 6) Head-to-head points; 7) Head-to-head matches won; 8) Head-to-head goal difference; 9) Head-to-head goals scored; 10) Head-to-head away goals scored; 11) Draw.
(C) Champions; (W) Cup winners

=== Kazakhstan Cup ===
14 April 2024 Last 16	Aktobe	1–0	Zhetysu	Aktobe
16:00 (UTC+5)	Bessmertny 44'; Umayev (yellow card) 90+1'; Strumia (yellow card) 90+2'	Report	Shramchenko (yellow card) 25' (red card) 85'; Dairov (yellow card) 30'	Stadium: Central Stadium; Attendance: 3,000; Referee: Ruslan Sultangaliev

8 May 2024 Quarterfinal	Ordabasy	1–2 (a.e.t.)	Aktobe	Shymkent
20:00 (UTC+5)	Malyi (yellow card) 10'; Yakhshiboev (yellow card) 80'; Makarenko 91'; Abiken (red card) 103'; Tagybergen (yellow card) 120+1'; Byesyedin (yellow card) 120+1'	Report	Romero 105+2'; Kenesov (yellow card) 108'; Jean 117'; Kairov (yellow card) 118'; Strumia (yellow card) 120+1'	Stadium: Kazhymukan Munaitpasov Stadium; Attendance: 17,083; Referee: Artem Kuchin

29 May 2024 Semifinal 1st leg	Aktobe	2–0	Elimai	Aktobe
20:00 (UTC+5)	Agbo (yellow card) 23'; Romero 25'; Samorodov 33'	Report	Shomko (yellow card) 55'	Stadium: Central Stadium; Attendance: 12,600; Referee: Bulat Sariev

19 June 2024 Semifinal 2nd leg	Elimai	2–1 (2–3 agg.)	Aktobe	Semey
20:00 (UTC+5)	Nurgaliyev (yellow card) 35'; Murtazayev 51'; Shomko 59'; Cornette (yellow card) 78'; Payruz (yellow card) 88'	Report	Samorodov 37'; Kiki (yellow card) 53' (red card) 58'; Kairov (yellow card) 79'; Jean (yellow card) 86'; Orazov (yellow card) 90+1'; Tanzharikov (yellow card) 90+2'; Shatsky (yellow card) 90+7'	Stadium: Spartak Stadium; Attendance: 8,500; Referee: Baghdad Abdullayev

29 September 2024 Final	Atyrau	1–2	Aktobe	Almaty
17:00 (UTC+5)	Signevich 24' (yellow card) 81'; Kerimzhanov (yellow card) 41'; Stasevich (yellow card) 45+1'; Novak (yellow card) 73'	Report	Kasym (yellow card) 81' (goal) 89' (pen.); Góndola 90' (yellow card) 90+2'; Umayev (yellow card) 90+5'; Shatsky (yellow card) 90+6'	Stadium: Central Stadium; Attendance: 13,576; Referee: Daniyar Sakhi

=== League Cup ===
==== Group stage ====
Pos	Team	Pld	W	D	L	GF	GA	GD	Pts	Qualification
1	Zhenis	3	2	0	1	4	2	+2	6	Advanced to Semifinals
2	Aktobe	3	2	0	1	4	3	+1	6	
3	Kaisar	3	1	0	2	5	4	+1	3	
4	Tobol	3	1	0	2	3	7	−4	3	

Updated to match(es) played on 21 July 2024. Source:

25 May 2024 1	Aktobe	2–0	Kaisar	Aktobe
20:00 (UTC+5)	Vătăjelu (yellow card) 10'; Cevallos 29'; Samorodov (yellow card) 50' (goal) 68'	Report	Kalmuratov (yellow card) 17'; Tolegenov (yellow card) 81'; Sakhalbaev (yellow card) 82'	Stadium: Central Stadium; Attendance: 12,600; Referee: Aydin Tasybaev

6 July 2024 2	Tobol	2–0	Aktobe	Kostanay
18:00 (UTC+5)	Zhaylaubaev (yellow card) 9'; Tsonev 29'; Zhumadelov 47'; Galym (yellow card) 57'	Report		Stadium: Central Stadium; Attendance: 3,000; Referee: Rustam Omarov

21 July 2024 3	Aktobe	2–1	Zhenis	Aktobe
20:00 (UTC+5)	Umaniyazov (yellow card) 31'; Tevzadze 78' (o.g.); Cevallos 83'; Jean (yellow card) 85'; Umayev (yellow card) 90+4'; Samorodov (yellow card) 90+4'	Report	Silva (yellow card) 36'; Oliveira (yellow card) 50'; Pantsulaia 71'; Rom (yellow card) 90+4'	Stadium: Central Stadium; Attendance: 12,000; Referee: Denis Izmailov

=== UEFA Conference League ===
==== Qualifying rounds ====
11 July 2024 First qualifying round 1st leg	Aktobe (Kazakhstan)	0–1	(Bosnia and Herzegovina) Sarajevo	Aktobe, Kazakhstan
20:00 (UTC+5)	Bessmertny (yellow card) 65'; Tanzharikov (yellow card) 80'	Report	Mustafić (yellow card) 24'; Anđušić (yellow card) 37'; Soldo (yellow card) 55'; Beganović (yellow card) 78'; Kyeremeh 90' (yellow card) 90+1'; Rogić (yellow card) 90'	Stadium: Central Stadium; Referee: Ivo Torres (Luxembourg)

18 July 2024 First qualifying round 2nd leg	Sarajevo (Bosnia and Herzegovina)	2–3 (a.e.t.) (3–3 agg.) (4–3 p)	(Kazakhstan) Aktobe	Sarajevo, Bosnia and Herzegovina
23:00 (UTC+5)	Đorđević (yellow card) 52'; Guliashvili 57'; Rockov (yellow card) 73'; Đuričković (yellow card) 79' (yellow-red card) 105+1'; Oliveira 96'; Soldo (yellow card) 120+2'; Duraković (yellow card) 130'	Report	Cevallos (yellow card) 25'; Umayev 41' (yellow card) 44'; Tanzharikov 75'; Jean 93'; Samorodov (yellow card) 120+2'; Umaniyazov (yellow card) 120+2'	Stadium: Koševo City Stadium; Attendance: 21,667; Referee: Zorbay Küçük (Turkey)
	Penalties
	Anđušić (penalty missed); Mehmedović (penalty scored); Oliveira (penalty scored); Julardžija (penalty scored); Duraković (penalty scored)		(penalty missed) Romero; (penalty scored) Tanzharikov; (penalty scored) Jean; (penalty missed) Samorodov; (penalty scored) Kasym

== Squad statistics ==
As of match played 10 November 2024

=== Appearances and goals ===
No.	Pos	Nat	Player	Total		Premier League		Kazakhstan Cup		League Cup		UEFA Conference League	
No.	Pos	Nat	Player	Apps	Goals	Apps	Goals	Apps	Goals	Apps	Goals	Apps	Goals
1	GK	(Kazakhstan) KAZ	Igor Trofimets	5	0	0	0	3	0	2	0	0	0
3	MF	(Belarus) BLR	Dmitry Bessmertny	30	1	16+6	0	3+1	1	1+1	0	1+1	0
4	MF	(Nigeria) NGR	Uche Agbo	28	3	19+1	3	4+1	0	2	0	1	0
5	MF	(Argentina) ARG	Leonel Strumia	28	0	18+3	0	4	0	0+1	0	2	0
6	DF	(Kazakhstan) KAZ	Alibek Kasym	30	5	22+1	4	5	1	1	0	0+1	0
11	FW	(Russia) RUS	Idris Umayev	30	7	10+12	6	2+2	0	2	0	1+1	1
12	FW	(Guinea) GUI	Amadou Doumbouya	22	1	8+9	1	1	0	1+1	0	2	0
15	DF	(Cameroon) CMR	Gaby Kiki	25	0	17+2	0	3	0	1	0	2	0
16	MF	(Ecuador) ECU	José Cevallos	25	4	13+5	2	2+1	0	2	2	2	0
17	FW	(Dominican Republic) DOM	Dorny Romero	31	7	16+6	5	4+1	2	0+2	0	2	0
18	MF	(Haiti) HAI	Jayro Jean	31	6	12+10	4	2+3	1	1+1	0	0+2	1
24	DF	(Kazakhstan) KAZ	Bagdat Kairov	16	0	8+4	0	2+1	0	1	0	0	0
25	GK	(Kazakhstan) KAZ	Evgeniy Sitdikov	1	0	0	0	0	0	1	0	0	0
30	GK	(Kazakhstan) KAZ	Igor Shatsky	28	0	24	0	2	0	0	0	2	0
31	DF	(Kazakhstan) KAZ	Adilkhan Tanzharikov	18	2	12+1	1	1+1	0	1	0	1+1	1
42	MF	(Kazakhstan) KAZ	Ayan Baydavletov	2	0	0	0	0	0	1+1	0	0	0
43	MF	(Kazakhstan) KAZ	Didar Ongarbaev	1	0	0	0	0	0	1	0	0	0
44	DF	(Croatia) CRO	Mateo Barać	24	1	12+4	1	3+2	0	1	0	2	0
48	MF	(Kazakhstan) KAZ	Alisher Kenzhegulov	3	0	0+2	0	0	0	0+1	0	0	0
49	MF	(Kazakhstan) KAZ	Miram Kikbaev	1	0	0	0	0	0	0+1	0	0	0
57	MF	(Kazakhstan) KAZ	Miras Umaniyazov	4	0	0+2	0	0	0	1	0	0+1	0
58	DF	(Kazakhstan) KAZ	Alimzhan Sagyntaev	1	0	0	0	0	0	1	0	0	0
59	MF	(Kazakhstan) KAZ	Islam Abilkasov	1	0	0	0	0	0	0+1	0	0	0
62	DF	(Kazakhstan) KAZ	Askerbek Baydalinov	1	0	0	0	0	0	1	0	0	0
63	MF	(Kazakhstan) KAZ	Alim Abatay	1	0	0	0	0	0	0+1	0	0	0
67	MF	(Kazakhstan) KAZ	Darkhan Berdibek	1	0	0+1	0	0	0	0	0	0	0
68	DF	(Kazakhstan) KAZ	Doszhan Sabitov	1	0	0	0	0	0	1	0	0	0
71	MF	(Kazakhstan) KAZ	Beybarys Imankul	1	0	0	0	0	0	1	0	0	0
73	FW	(Kazakhstan) KAZ	Adilbek Begimov	1	0	0	0	0	0	0+1	0	0	0
78	DF	(Kazakhstan) KAZ	Dias Ondasynov	1	0	0	0	0	0	1	0	0	0
79	MF	(Kazakhstan) KAZ	Nurlybek Kashkankul	1	0	0	0	0	0	1	0	0	0
80	MF	(Kazakhstan) KAZ	Arman Kenesov	29	3	6+14	3	1+4	0	2	0	0+2	0
81	MF	(Kazakhstan) KAZ	Beket Shamsheden	1	0	0	0	0	0	1	0	0	0
82	DF	(Kazakhstan) KAZ	Azamat Zhumagaliev	1	0	0	0	0	0	0+1	0	0	0
83	FW	(Kazakhstan) KAZ	Doszhan Arystanov	1	0	0	0	0	0	1	0	0	0
88	DF	(Romania) ROU	Bogdan Vătăjelu	33	1	23+1	1	5	0	1+1	0	2	0
99	FW	(Panama) PAN	Freddy Góndola	9	3	6+2	2	1	1	0	0	0	0
Players away from Aktobe on loan:
Players who left Aktobe during the season:
7	MF	(Kazakhstan) KAZ	Bauyrzhan Baytana	15	1	7+3	1	1+3	0	0	0	0+1	0
10	FW	(Kazakhstan) KAZ	Maksim Samorodov	20	9	12+1	5	4	2	1	1+1	2	0
20	MF	(Kazakhstan) KAZ	Ramazan Orazov	14	0	3+6	0	2+2	0	1	0	0	0

=== Goal scorers ===
Place	Position	Nation	Number	Name	Premier League	Kazakhstan Cup	League Cup	UEFA Conference League	Total
1	FW	(Kazakhstan)	10	Maksim Samorodov	5	2	1	0	8
2	FW	(Russia)	11	Idris Umayev	6	0	0	1	7
2	FW	(Dominican Republic)	17	Dorny Romero	5	2	0	0	7
4	MF	(Haiti)	18	Jayro Jean	4	1	0	1	6
5	DF	(Kazakhstan)	6	Alibek Kasym	4	1	0	0	5
6	MF	(Ecuador)	16	José Cevallos	2	0	2	0	4
7	MF	(Kazakhstan)	80	Arman Kenesov	3	0	0	0	3
7	FW	(Panama)	99	Freddy Góndola	2	1	0	0	3
9	MF	(Nigeria)	4	Uche Agbo	2	0	0	0	2
9	DF	(Kazakhstan)	31	Adilkhan Tanzharikov	1	0	0	1	2
11	DF	(Croatia)	44	Mateo Barać	1	0	0	0	1
11	MF	(Kazakhstan)	7	Bauyrzhan Baytana	1	0	0	0	1
11	DF	(Romania)	88	Bogdan Vătăjelu	1	0	0	0	1
11	FW	(Guinea)	12	Amadou Doumbouya	1	0	0	0	1
11	MF	(Belarus)	3	Dmitry Bessmertny	0	1	0	0	1
11				Own goal	0	0	1	0	1
				TOTALS	39	8	4	3	52

=== Clean sheets ===
Place	Position	Nation	Number	Name	Premier League	Kazakhstan Cup	League Cup	UEFA Conference League	Total
1	GK	(Kazakhstan)	30	Igor Shatsky	8	0	0	0	8
2	GK	(Kazakhstan)	1	Igor Trofimets	0	2	1	0	3
				TOTALS	8	2	1	0	11

=== Disciplinary record ===
Number	Nation	Position	Name	Premier League		Kazakhstan Cup		League Cup		UEFA Conference League		Total	
Number	Nation	Position	Name	Booked	Sent off (straight red)	Booked	Sent off (straight red)	Booked	Sent off (straight red)	Booked	Sent off (straight red)	Booked	Sent off (straight red)
3	(Belarus)	MF	Dmitry Bessmertny	0	0	0	0	0	0	1	0	1	0
4	(Nigeria)	MF	Uche Agbo	4	1	1	0	0	0	0	0	5	1
5	(Argentina)	MF	Leonel Strumia	6	0	2	0	0	0	0	0	8	0
6	(Kazakhstan)	DF	Alibek Kasym	4	0	1	0	0	0	0	0	5	0
11	(Russia)	FW	Idris Umayev	3	0	2	0	1	0	1	0	7	0
12	(Guinea)	FW	Amadou Doumbouya	3	0	0	0	0	0	0	0	3	0
15	(Cameroon)	DF	Gaby Kiki	2	0	1	1	0	0	0	0	3	1
16	(Ecuador)	MF	José Cevallos	1	0	0	0	0	0	1	0	2	0
17	(Dominican Republic)	FW	Dorny Romero	3	0	0	0	0	0	0	0	3	0
18	(Haiti)	MF	Jayro Jean	1	0	1	0	1	0	0	0	3	0
24	(Kazakhstan)	DF	Bagdat Kairov	6	0	2	0	0	0	0	0	8	0
30	(Kazakhstan)	GK	Igor Shatsky	2	0	2	0	0	0	0	0	4	0
31	(Kazakhstan)	DF	Adilkhan Tanzharikov	3	0	1	0	0	0	1	0	5	0
44	(Croatia)	DF	Mateo Barać	5	1	0	0	0	0	0	0	5	1
57	(Kazakhstan)	MF	Miras Umaniyazov	0	0	0	0	1	0	1	0	2	0
80	(Kazakhstan)	MF	Arman Kenesov	5	0	1	0	0	0	0	0	6	0
88	(Romania)	DF	Bogdan Vătăjelu	3	0	0	0	1	0	0	0	4	0
99	(Panama)	FW	Freddy Góndola	1	0	1	0	0	0	0	0	2	0
Players away on loan:
Players who left Aktobe during the season:
7	(Kazakhstan)	MF	Bauyrzhan Baytana	3	0	0	0	0	0	0	0	3	0
10	(Kazakhstan)	FW	Maksim Samorodov	1	0	0	0	2	0	1	0	4	0
20	(Kazakhstan)	MF	Ramazan Orazov	2	0	1	0	0	0	0	0	3	0
			TOTALS	58	2	16	1	6	0	6	0	86	3
