= 2024 Kazakhstan Cup =

Tournament details
- Country: Kazakhstan
- Teams: 32

Final positions
- Champions: Aktobe
- Runners-up: Atyrau

Tournament statistics
- Matches played: 41
- Goals scored: 98 (2.39 per match)
- Top goal scorer(s): Aslanbek Kakimov (3); Nikolay Signevich (3); Ahmed El Messaoudi (3)
- All statistics correct as of 19 June 2024.

The 2024 Kazakhstan Cup (known as the Fonbet Kazakhstan Cup for sponsorship reasons) was the 32nd season of the Kazakhstan Cup, the annual nationwide football cup competition of Kazakhstan since the independence of the country. Tobol are the defending champions.

== Participating clubs ==
On 7 March, the Kazakhstan Football League announced that 32 clubs would participate in the 2024 edition of the Kazakhstan Cup, commencing on 11 March and finishing on 29 September.

The following teams entered the competition:

Kazakhstan Premier League all 13 clubs of the 2024 season	Kazakhstan First League; 13 clubs of the 2024 season	Kazakhstan Second League; 6 clubs of the 2024 season
Aktobe; Astana; Atyrau; Elimai; Kairat; Kaisar; Kyzylzhar; Ordabasy; Shakhter Karagandy; Tobol; Turan; Zhenis; Zhetysu	Akzhayik; Altai; Arys; Caspiy; Ekibastuz; Khan-Tengri; Kyran; Okzhetpes; SD Family; Taraz; Turkestan; Ulytau; Zhetysay	Akademiya Ontustik; AKAS; Aksu; Irtysh Pavlodar; Maktaaral; Zhas Kyran

=== Format and schedule ===
Round	Clubs remaining	Clubs involved	First match date
Group stage	32	19	11 March 2024
Play-off round	19	6	21 March 2024
Round of 16	16	16	13 April 2024
Quarter-finals	8	8	8 May 2024
Semi-finals	4	4	19 June 2024
Final	2	2	29 September 2024

== Group stage ==
The nineteen clubs from the Kazakhstan First and Second leagues entered the group stage, split into six groups. Each team played every other team in their group once (either at home or away).

=== Draw summary ===
Group A	Group B	Group C	Group D	Group E	Group F
AKAS; Irtysh Pavlodar; Khan-Tengri; Okzhetpes	Akademia Ontustik; Akzhayik; Altai	Ekibastuzets; Taraz; Turkistan	Arys; Caspiy; Jas Qyran	Maktaaral; SD Family; Ulytau	Aksu; Kyran; Zhetisay

=== Group A ===
Pos	Team	Pld	W	D	L	GF	GA	GD	Pts	Qualification
1	Irtysh Pavlodar	3	2	1	0	3	1	+2	7	Advance to Play-off round
2	AKAS	3	1	2	0	4	3	+1	5	
3	Okzhetpes	3	0	2	1	3	4	−1	2	
4	Khan-Tengri	3	0	1	2	3	5	−2	1	

Source: qfl.kz
Rules for classification: 1) Points; 2) Goal difference; 3) Goals scored; 4) Head-to-head record; 5) Lowest disciplinary points; 6) Highest ranked team

11 March 2024 1	Okzhetpes	1 – 1	AKAS	Shymkent
12:00 (UTC+5)	Amirkhanov (yellow card) 24'; Idrisov 43'; Serikbay (yellow card) 73'; Gagaev (yellow card) 80'	Report	Bitusupov 14'; Meleshchenko (yellow card) 31'; Bulgakbaev (yellow card) 44'; Vasilchenko (yellow card) 59'; Baltabay (yellow card) 86'	Stadium: BIIK Stadium; Attendance: 50; Referee: Ramazan Nurdinov

11 March 2024 1	Irtysh Pavlodar	1 – 0	Khan-Tengri	Shymkent
16:00 (UTC+5)	Baizhanov (yellow card) 46'; Toleuov (yellow card) 49'; Popov 84'	Report	Erlan (yellow card) 24'; Tuzakbaev (yellow card) 30'	Stadium: BIIK Stadium; Attendance: 100; Referee: Muradbek Khalilov

15 March 2024 2	Irtysh Pavlodar	1 – 0	Okzhetpes	Shymkent
10:00 (UTC+5)	Yesimov (yellow card) 17' (goal) 31'; Abdualiev (yellow card) 22'; Baizhanov (yellow card) 22'; Vomenko (yellow card) 31'; Toleuov (yellow card) 82'; Erzhanov (yellow card) 90+3'	Report	Izbasarov (yellow card) 22'; Zhaksylykov (yellow card) 22'; Adil (yellow card) 77'	Stadium: BIIK Stadium; Attendance: 30; Referee: Nurzhan Zhumashev

15 March 2024 2	Khan-Tengri	1 – 2	AKAS	Shymkent
16:00 (UTC+5)	Shakhmetov 90+3'	Report	Medelhan 25'; Gridin 56'	Stadium: BIIK Stadium; Attendance: 20; Referee: Eldos Kanaev

18 March 2024 3	Okzhetpes	2 – 2	Khan-Tengri	Shymkent
10:00 (UTC+5)	Zhaksylykov (yellow card) 79' (goal) 87'; Gagaev 90+2'	Report	Amirseitov 48'; Karavaev (yellow card) 55'; Serikbay 62' (o.g.); Elemes (yellow card) 86'	Stadium: BIIK Stadium; Attendance: 50; Referee: Saken Baimbet

18 March 2024 3	AKAS	1 – 1	Irtysh Pavlodar	Shymkent
12:00 (UTC+5)	Gridin 31'; Nurdaliev (yellow card) 44'; Meleshchenko (yellow card) 53'; Sabdirov (yellow card) 71'; Suyunov (yellow card) 78'; Glazunov (yellow card) 90'; Bulgakbaev (red card) FT	Report	Vomenko 72'	Stadium: BIIK Stadium; Attendance: 100; Referee: Samat Zharilkasinov

=== Group B ===
Pos	Team	Pld	W	D	L	GF	GA	GD	Pts	Qualification
1	Akademia Ontustik	2	2	0	0	3	0	+3	6	Advance to Play-off round
2	Altai	2	1	0	1	1	2	−1	3	
3	Akzhayik	2	0	0	2	0	2	−2	0	

Source: qfl.kz
Rules for classification: 1) Points; 2) Goal difference; 3) Goals scored; 4) Head-to-head record; 5) Lowest disciplinary points; 6) Highest ranked team

11 March 2024 1	Akzhayik	0 – 1	Akademia Ontustik	Shymkent
14:00 (UTC+5)	Omarov (yellow card) 6'; Umbetov (yellow card) 36'; Abdrakhmanov (yellow card) 77'	Report	Toktybai (yellow card) 53'; Turganov (yellow card) 79'; Nurali 90+1'	Stadium: BIIK Stadium; Attendance: 100; Referee: Nurzhan Zhumashev

15 March 2024 2	Akademia Ontustik	2 – 0	Altai	Shymkent
12:00 (UTC+5)	Toktybai 18'; Donbay 40'	Report	Sapargaliev (yellow card) 20'	Stadium: BIIK Stadium; Attendance: 55; Referee: Eradil Tileuov

17 March 2024 3	Altai	1 – 0	Akzhayik	Shymkent
16:00 (UTC+5)	Rakhimzhanov 22'; Kan (yellow card) 58'; Seytkaliev (yellow card) 88'	Report	Pangerei (yellow card) 60'; Rejepov (yellow card) 69'; Chirkov (yellow card) 90'	Stadium: BIIK Stadium

=== Group C ===
Pos	Team	Pld	W	D	L	GF	GA	GD	Pts	Qualification
1	Taraz	2	2	0	0	5	1	+4	6	Advance to Play-off round
2	Ekibastuzets	2	0	1	1	2	3	−1	1	
3	Turkistan	2	0	1	1	1	4	−3	1	

Source: qfl.kz
Rules for classification: 1) Points; 2) Goal difference; 3) Goals scored; 4) Head-to-head record; 5) Lowest disciplinary points; 6) Highest ranked team

12 March 2024 1	Taraz	2 – 1	Ekibastuzets	Shymkent
13:00 (UTC+5)	Orynbasar 23'; Toybekov (yellow card) 72'; Keulimzhay 90+3'	Report	Nurlan 52'; Saken (yellow card) 64'; Mukhametzhanov (yellow card) 67'	Stadium: BIIK Stadium; Attendance: 50; Referee: Eradil Tileuov

15 March 2024 2	Ekibastuzets	1 – 1	Turkistan	Shymkent
14:00 (UTC+5)	Krasotin 10'; Maksutov (yellow card) 77'	Report	Auelbay (yellow card) 44'; Omirbek (yellow card) 59'; Zhasanov (yellow card) 87'; Sufashov 90+1'; Nurzhumaev (yellow card) 90+3'	Stadium: BIIK Stadium; Attendance: 50; Referee: Daniyar Sakhi

18 March 2024 3	Turkistan	0 – 3	Taraz	Shymkent
14:00 (UTC+5)	Zhasanov (yellow card) 54'; Abdualiev (yellow card) 72'; Zhaksylyk (yellow card) 87'	Report	Serikuly 36', 90+5'; Rakhmet 79'	Stadium: BIIK Stadium; Attendance: 100; Referee: Muradbek Khalilov

=== Group D ===
Pos	Team	Pld	W	D	L	GF	GA	GD	Pts	Qualification
1	Jas Qyran	2	2	0	0	5	2	+3	6	Advance to Play-off round
2	Arys	2	0	1	1	0	1	−1	1	
3	Caspiy	2	0	1	1	2	4	−2	1	

Source: qfl.kz
Rules for classification: 1) Points; 2) Goal difference; 3) Goals scored; 4) Head-to-head record; 5) Lowest disciplinary points; 6) Highest ranked team

12 March 2024 1	Caspiy	2 – 4	Jas Qyran	Shymkent
16:00 (UTC+5)	Abilkairov 7'; Berdibek (yellow card) 34'; Taikenov 76'; Zhumabay (yellow card) 85'	Report	Alikhan 5'; Alimzhan (yellow card) 28'; Kabirov 35'; Zhaisanbek 45'; Mukhametzhanov (yellow card) 51' (goal) 57'; Abdigali (yellow card) 85'	Stadium: BIIK Stadium; Attendance: 30; Referee: Eldos Kanaev

15 March 2024 2	Jas Qyran	1 – 0	Arys	Shymkent
16:00 (UTC+5)	Alikhan (yellow card) 4'; Zakharov 52'; Kabirov (yellow card) 69'	Report	Tolebek (yellow card) 21'	Stadium: BIIK Stadium; Attendance: 100; Referee: Muradbek Khalilov

18 March 2024 3	Arys	0 – 0	Caspiy	Shymkent
16:00 (UTC+5)	Kuralbaev (yellow card) 23'; Zulfikarov (yellow card) 30'; Dosanov (yellow card) 39'; Zharylkasyn (yellow card) 73'; Amirov (yellow card) 85'; Tagiev (yellow card) 87'	Report	Abilkairov (yellow card) 23'; Nabikhanov (yellow card) 77'	Stadium: BIIK Stadium; Attendance: 30; Referee: Baghdad Abdullayev

=== Group E ===
Pos	Team	Pld	W	D	L	GF	GA	GD	Pts	Qualification
1	SD Family	2	2	0	0	4	0	+4	6	Advance to Play-off round
2	Ulytau	2	1	0	1	1	2	−1	3	
3	Maktaaral	2	0	0	2	0	3	−3	0	

Source: qfl.kz
Rules for classification: 1) Points; 2) Goal difference; 3) Goals scored; 4) Head-to-head record; 5) Lowest disciplinary points; 6) Highest ranked team

13 March 2024 1	SD Family	2 – 0	Ulytau	Shymkent
13:00 (UTC+5)	Kaltanov 11'; Daniyarov (yellow card) 47' (goal) 88'; Sagnaev (yellow card) 57'; Tsoi (yellow card) 90+3'	Report	Nursultanov (yellow card) 23'; Rzataev (yellow card) 90+5'	Stadium: BIIK Stadium; Attendance: 100; Referee: Birzhan Serjanuly

16 March 2024 2	Ulytau	1 – 0	Maktaaral	Shymkent
13:00 (UTC+5)	Chalkin 39'; Aslan (yellow card) 62'	Report	Aripov (yellow card) 20'; Ali-Ogly (yellow card) 31'	Stadium: BIIK Stadium

19 March 2024 3	Maktaaral	0 – 2	SD Family	Shymkent
13:00 (UTC+5)	Musaev (yellow card) 39'; Imanali (yellow card) 65'	Report	Sagnaev (yellow card) 33' (goal) 70'; Daniyarov 71' (yellow card) 78'	Stadium: BIIK Stadium; Attendance: 100; Referee: Baghdad Abdullayev

=== Group F ===
Pos	Team	Pld	W	D	L	GF	GA	GD	Pts	Qualification
1	Zhetisay	2	1	1	0	4	1	+3	4	Advance to Play-off round
2	Aksu	2	1	0	1	5	5	0	3	
3	Kyran	2	0	1	1	3	6	−3	1	

Source: qfl.kz
Rules for classification: 1) Points; 2) Goal difference; 3) Goals scored; 4) Head-to-head record; 5) Lowest disciplinary points; 6) Highest ranked team

13 March 2024 1	Aksu	0 – 3	Zhetisay	Shymkent
16:00 (UTC+5)	Agimanov (yellow card) 39'; Duysenbeck (yellow card) 57'; Turlybek (penalty missed) 76'; Zakaria (yellow card) 87'	Report	Abylaykhan (yellow card) 14' (goal) 47'; Sarbai (yellow card) 32'; Ryskul (yellow card) 36'; Mukhituly (yellow card) 50' (goal) 88'; Serikkul 59'; Mazhitov (yellow card) 65'; Malikaidar (yellow card) 85'	Stadium: BIIK Stadium; Attendance: 250; Referee: Abdukadyr Kurbanov

16 March 2024 2	Zhetisay	1 – 1	Kyran	Shymkent
16:00 (UTC+5)	Abylaykhan (yellow card) 5'; Maulenov (yellow card) 60'; Ryskul 76'	Report	Abzhal 70'; Kuanyshbay (yellow card) FT; Umarov (yellow card) FT; Ermekuulu (yellow card) FT	Stadium: BIIK Stadium

19 March 2024 3	Kyran	2 – 5	Aksu	Shymkent
16:00 (UTC+5)	Tuleyev 15'; Erzhigit (yellow card) 16'; Amanbay (yellow card) 43'; Abzhal 54'; Zhaksybayuly (yellow card) 70'; Umarov (yellow card) 73'; Kuanyshbay (yellow card) 76'	Report	Kakimov 2', 21', 46'; Denisov (yellow card) 27'; Zakaria (yellow card) 31'; Kasain (yellow card) 46'; Turlybek 51'; Duysenbeck (yellow card) 54'; Muralinov (yellow card) 72'; Kalym 90+4'	Stadium: BIIK Stadium; Attendance: 100; Referee: Sanjar Iskakov

== Play-off round ==
The six group stage winners entered the play-off round, with the matches taking place between 21 and 23 March.

=== Summary ===
Team 1	Score	Team 2
Akademia Ontustik	1–0	Irtysh Pavlodar
Taraz	1–0 (a.e.t.)	Jas Qyran
SD Family	2–1	Zhetisay

=== Matches ===
21 March 2024	Akademia Ontustik	1 – 0	Irtysh Pavlodar	Shymkent
15:00 (UTC+5)	Khasanov (yellow card) 25'; Babanazarov 39'; Toktybay (yellow card) 78'	Report	Bayzhanov (yellow card) 25'; Erzhanov (yellow card) 70'; Barkunov (yellow card) 78'; Erengaip (yellow card) 90'	Stadium: BIIK Stadium; Attendance: 300; Referee: Saken Baimbet

22 March 2024	Taraz	1 – 0 (a.e.t.)	Jas Qyran	Shymkent
13:00 (UTC+5)	Lesbeck (yellow card) 54'; Rahmetulla (yellow card) 55'; Ashirbek (yellow card) 56'; Kemelbek (yellow card) 59' (goal) 117'; Keulimzhay (yellow card) 76'	Report	Zhaisanbek (yellow card) 56'; Mukhametzhanov (yellow card) 56'	Stadium: BIIK Stadium; Attendance: 30; Referee: Muradbek Khalilov

23 March 2024	SD Family	2 – 1	Zhetisay	Shymkent
15:00 (UTC+5)	Madelkhan (yellow card) 7'; Andirmash 52' (pen.); Demin (yellow card) 79'; Narkulov (yellow card) 83' (goal) 90+2'; Dadaev (yellow card) 90+5'	Report	Maulenov (yellow card) 3'; Mazhitov 38'; Orazbek (yellow card) 43'; Ryskul (yellow card) 90'; Serikkul (yellow card) 90+5'	Stadium: BIIK Stadium; Attendance: 100; Referee: Baghdad Abdullayev

== Round of 16 ==
The thirteen Premier League teams and three play-off round winners entered the Round of 16, which took place on 13 and 14 April 2024.

=== Summary ===
Team 1	Score	Team 2
Atyrau	6–0	SD Family
Kaisar	0–3	Tobol
Zhenis	0–1	Astana
Kairat	3–0	Turan
Akademia Ontustik	1–2	Kyzylzhar
Taraz	0–2	Ordabasy
Aktobe	1–0	Zhetysu
Elimai	2–1	Shakhter Karagandy

=== Matches ===
13 April 2024	Atyrau	6 – 0	SD Family	Atyrau
14:00 (UTC+5)	Barbosa 28', 67'; Olimzoda 33'; Stepanov (yellow card) 42' (goal) 84'; Eugénio 45+1', 87' (pen.)	Report	Dyusembekov (yellow card) 9'; Madelkhan (yellow card) 34'; Andirmash (yellow card) 44'; Tsoi (yellow card) 72'; Narkulov (yellow card) 77'; Demin (yellow card) 89'	Stadium: Munaishy Stadium; Attendance: 2,000; Referee: Alexander Zatula

13 April 2024	Kaisar	0 – 3	Tobol	Kyzylorda
14:00 (UTC+5)	Kobuladze (yellow card) 34'; Kenesbek (yellow card) 82'	Report	El Messaoudi 27', 84'; Gabarayev (yellow card) 37'; Tsonev 60'; Miladinović (yellow card) 63'; Galym (yellow card) 90+1'	Stadium: Gani Muratbayev Stadium; Attendance: 1,000; Referee: Sayat Sulikanov

13 April 2024	Zhenis	0 – 1	Astana	Astana
16:00 (UTC+5)	Manaj (yellow card) 36'	Report	Karimov 5'; Masouras (yellow card) 90+1'	Stadium: Kazhymukan Munaitpasov Stadium; Attendance: 400; Referee: Georgy Chekhovsky

13 April 2024	Kairat	3 – 0	Turan	Almaty
18:00 (UTC+5)	Santana 29'; Gadrani 40'; Arad (yellow card) 67'; Seydakhmet 90+4' (pen.)	Report	Shamshi (yellow card) 14'; Nikolić (yellow card) 32'; Mawutor (yellow card) 54'; Dmitrijev (yellow card) 80'	Stadium: Central Stadium; Attendance: 5,748; Referee: Aydin Tasybaev

14 April 2024	Akademia Ontustik	1 – 2	Kyzylzhar	Shymkent
14:00 (UTC+5)	Donbay 27'; Khasanov (yellow card) 30' (red card) 81'; Sakenuly (yellow card) 74'; Babanazarov (yellow card) 76'; Askar (yellow card) 81'	Report	Khaseyn 70'; Brígido 71' (yellow card) 85'	Stadium: BIIK Stadium; Attendance: 175; Referee: Kirill Tkachev

14 April 2024	Taraz	0 – 2	Ordabasy	Taraz
14:00 (UTC+5)	Asan (yellow card) 30'; Zhaksymbetov (yellow card) 62'; Ashirbek (yellow card) 89'	Report	Reginaldo (yellow card) 28' (goal) 36'; Tungyshbayev 37'; Malyi (yellow card) 47'; Makarenko (yellow card) 53'	Stadium: Central Stadium; Attendance: 6,200; Referee: Sanjar Iskakov

14 April 2024	Aktobe	1 – 0	Zhetysu	Aktobe
16:00 (UTC+5)	Bessmertny 44'; Umayev (yellow card) 90+1'; Strumia (yellow card) 90+2'	Report	Shramchenko (yellow card) 25' (red card) 85'; Dairov (yellow card) 30'	Stadium: Central Stadium; Attendance: 3,000; Referee: Ruslan Sultangaliev

14 April 2024	Elimai	2 – 1	Shakhter Karagandy	Semey
16:00 (UTC+5)	China 50'; Sviridov 89'	Report	Stamenković (yellow card) 30'; Savkiv (yellow card) 56'; Bachek 73'; Alishauskas (yellow card) 86'	Stadium: Spartak Stadium; Attendance: 250; Referee: Sakhi Daniyar

== Quarter-finals ==
The eight round of 16 winners entered the quarter-finals, which took place on 8 May 2024.

=== Summary ===
Team 1	Score	Team 2
Atyrau	3–1	Kairat
Tobol	1–0	Astana
Elimai	1–0	Kyzylzhar
Ordabasy	1–2 (a.e.t.)	Aktobe

=== Matches ===
8 May 2024	Atyrau	3 – 1	Kairat	Atyrau
18:00 (UTC+5)	Stasevich 10'; Kerimzhanov 13'; Zhumakhanov (red card) 17'; Novak 43'; Kayamba (yellow card) 73'; Adil (yellow card) 90+2'; Olimzoda (yellow card) 90+7'	Report	João Paulo (penalty missed) 18'; Zaria (yellow card) 30'; Seydakhmet (yellow card) 62'; Arad 70'; Shvyryov (yellow card) 90+6'	Stadium: Munaishy Stadium; Attendance: 5,500; Referee: Saken Baimbet

8 May 2024	Tobol	1 – 0	Astana	Kostanay
18:00 (UTC+5)	Chesnokov 20' (yellow card) 90+4'; Gabarayev (yellow card) 72'	Report	Astanov (yellow card) 72'	Stadium: Central Stadium; Attendance: 2,850; Referee: Bulat Sariev

8 May 2024	Elimai	1 – 0	Kyzylzhar	Semey
20:00 (UTC+5)	Korzun (yellow card) 51' (goal) 81'	Report	Nižić (yellow card) 34'; Abzalov (yellow card) 80'; Van Den Bogaert (yellow card) 90+1'	Stadium: Spartak Stadium; Attendance: 8,000; Referee: Georgy Chekhovsky

8 May 2024	Ordabasy	1 – 2 (a.e.t.)	Aktobe	Shymkent
20:00 (UTC+5)	Malyi (yellow card) 10'; Yakhshiboev (yellow card) 80'; Makarenko 91'; Abiken (red card) 103'; Tagybergen (yellow card) 120+1'; Byesyedin (yellow card) 120+1'	Report	Romero 105+2'; Kenesov (yellow card) 108'; Jean 117'; Kairov (yellow card) 118'; Strumia (yellow card) 120+1'	Stadium: Kazhymukan Munaitpasov Stadium; Attendance: 17,083; Referee: Artem Kuchin

== Semi-finals ==
The four quarter-final winners entered the semi-finals, held over two legs. The first legs were scheduled to take place on 29 May 2024, followed by the second legs on 19 June 2024.

=== Summary ===
Team 1	Agg.	Team 2	1st leg	2nd leg
Tobol	1–4	Atyrau	1–0	0–4
Aktobe	3–2	Elimai	2–0	1–2

=== Matches ===
29 May 2024	Tobol	1 – 0	Atyrau	Kostanay
18:00 (UTC+5)	Miladinović (yellow card) 24'; El Messaoudi 40' (pen.); Tapalov (yellow card) 44'; Cooper (yellow card) 87'	Report	Najaryan (yellow card) 22'; Kerimzhanov (yellow card) 38'; Olimzoda (yellow card) 90+2'	Stadium: Central Stadium; Attendance: 4,000; Referee: Artem Kuchin

19 June 2024	Atyrau	4 – 0 (4 – 1 agg.)	Tobol	Atyrau
18:00 (UTC+5)	Signevich 18', 52' (yellow card) 66'; Novak (yellow card) 22' (goal) 40'; Kerimzhanov (yellow card) 66'; Dzhumatov 90+9'	Report	Ndiaye (yellow card) 34'; Gabarayev (yellow card) 47'; Ivanović (yellow card) 80'	Stadium: Munaishy Stadium; Attendance: 3,500; Referee: Bulat Sariev

29 May 2024	Aktobe	2 – 0	Elimai	Aktobe
20:00 (UTC+5)	Agbo (yellow card) 23'; Romero 25'; Samorodov 33'	Report	Shomko (yellow card) 55'	Stadium: Central Stadium; Attendance: 12,600; Referee: Bulat Sariev

19 June 2024	Elimai	2 – 1 (2 – 3 agg.)	Aktobe	Semey
20:00 (UTC+5)	Nurgaliyev (yellow card) 35'; Murtazayev 51'; Shomko 59'; Cornette (yellow card) 78'; Payruz (yellow card) 88'	Report	Samorodov 37'; Kiki (yellow card) 53' (red card) 58'; Kairov (yellow card) 79'; Jean (yellow card) 86'; Orazov (yellow card) 90+1'; Tanzharikov (yellow card) 90+2'; Shatsky (yellow card) 90+7'	Stadium: Spartak Stadium; Attendance: 8,500; Referee: Baghdad Abdullayev

== Final ==
29 September 2024	Atyrau	1–2	Aktobe	Almaty
17:00 (UTC+5)	Signevich 24' (yellow card) 81'; Kerimzhanov (yellow card) 41'; Stasevich (yellow card) 45+1'; Novak (yellow card) 73'	Report	Kasym (yellow card) 81' (goal) 89' (pen.); Góndola 90' (yellow card) 90+2'; Umayev (yellow card) 90+5'; Shatsky (yellow card) 90+6'	Stadium: Central Stadium; Attendance: 13,576; Referee: Daniyar Sakhi

== Goal scorers ==
As of match played 29 September 2024

3 goals:

- (Kazakhstan) Aslanbek Kakimov - Aksu
- (Belarus) Nikolay Signevich - Atyrau
- (Morocco) Ahmed El Messaoudi - Tobol

2 goals:

- (Kazakhstan) Diyas Donbay - Akademia Ontustik
- (Kazakhstan) Sergey Gridin - AKAS
- (Dominican Republic) Dorny Romero - Aktobe
- (Kazakhstan) Maksim Samorodov - Aktobe
- (Brazil) Mateus Barbosa - Atyrau
- (Portugal) Pedro Eugénio - Atyrau
- (Slovenia) Jakob Novak - Atyrau
- (Kazakhstan) Serizhan Abzhal - Kyran
- (Kazakhstan) Bagdat Daniyarov - SD Family
- (Kazakhstan) Dimash Serikuly - Taraz

1 goals:

- (Kazakhstan) Zhavlanbek Babanazarov - Akademia Ontustik
- (Kazakhstan) Orken Nurali - Akademia Ontustik
- (Kazakhstan) Magzhan Toktybai - Akademia Ontustik
- (Kazakhstan) Damir Bitusupov - AKAS
- (Kazakhstan) Darkhan Medelhan - AKAS
- (Kazakhstan) Dastan Kalym - Aksu
- (Kazakhstan) Miras Turlybek - Aksu
- (Belarus) Dmitry Bessmertny - Aktobe
- (Haiti) Jayro Jean - Aktobe
- (Kazakhstan) Alibek Kasym - Aktobe
- (Panama) Freddy Góndola - Aktobe
- (Kazakhstan) Alisher Rakhimzhanov - Altai
- (Kazakhstan) Ramazan Karimov - Astana
- (Belarus) Igor Stasevich - Atyrau
- (Belarus) Nikita Stepanov - Atyrau
- (Kazakhstan) Rinat Dzhumatov - Atyrau
- (Kazakhstan) Olzhas Kerimzhanov - Atyrau
- (Tajikistan) Fatkhullo Olimzoda - Atyrau
- (Kazakhstan) Nurasyl Abilkairov - Caspiy
- (Kazakhstan) Maksat Taikenov - Caspiy
- (Kazakhstan) Anatoly Krasotin - Ekibastuzets
- (Kazakhstan) Alham Nurlan - Ekibastuzets
- (Belarus) Nikita Korzun - Elimai
- (Brazil) China - Elimai
- (Kazakhstan) Roman Murtazayev - Elimai
- (Kazakhstan) Dmitry Shomko - Elimai
- (Kazakhstan) Ivan Sviridov - Elimai
- (Kazakhstan) Artem Popov - Irtysh Pavlodar
- (Kazakhstan) Vladimir Vomenko - Irtysh Pavlodar
- (Kazakhstan) Ruslan Yesimov - Irtysh Pavlodar
- (Kazakhstan) Amir Alikhan - Jas Qyran
- (Kazakhstan) Sanjar Kabirov - Jas Qyran
- (Kazakhstan) Timur Mukhametzhanov - Jas Qyran
- (Kazakhstan) Ruslan Zakharov - Jas Qyran
- (Kazakhstan) Abylai Zhaisanbek - Jas Qyran
- (Brazil) Élder Santana - Kairat
- (Georgia (country)) Luka Gadrani - Kairat
- (Israel) Ofri Arad - Kairat
- (Kazakhstan) Yerkebulan Seydakhmet - Kairat
- (Kazakhstan) Ilyas Amirseitov - Khan-Tengri
- (Kazakhstan) Marat Shakhmetov - Khan-Tengri
- (Kazakhstan) Altynbek Tuleyev - Kyran
- (Kazakhstan) Madi Khaseyn - Kyzylzhar
- (Portugal) Rúben Brígido - Kyzylzhar
- (Kazakhstan) Igor Gagaev - Okzhetpes
- (Kazakhstan) Niyaz Idrisov - Okzhetpes
- (Kazakhstan) Zhalgas Zhaksylykov - Okzhetpes
- (Brazil) Reginaldo - Ordabasy
- (Kazakhstan) Yerkebulan Tungyshbayev - Ordabasy
- (Ukraine) Yevhen Makarenko - Ordabasy
- (Kazakhstan) Diaz Andirmash - SD Family
- (Kazakhstan) Kudaiberdy Narkulov - SD Family
- (Kazakhstan) Akhmetali Kaltanov - SD Family
- (Kazakhstan) Sultan Sagnaev - SD Family
- (Kazakhstan) Dmitry Bachek - Shakhter Karagandy
- (Kazakhstan) Sanjar Kemelbek - Taraz
- (Kazakhstan) Erasyl Keulimzhay - Taraz
- (Kazakhstan) Dias Orynbasar - Taraz
- (Kazakhstan) Bauyrzhan Rakhmet - Taraz
- (Bulgaria) Radoslav Tsonev - Tobol
- (Kazakhstan) Islam Chesnokov - Tobol
- (Kazakhstan) Anvar Sufashov - Turkistan
- (Kazakhstan) Maxim Chalkin - Ulytau
- (Kazakhstan) Ramazan Abylaykhan - Zhetisay
- (Kazakhstan) Dauren Mazhitov - Zhetisay
- (Kazakhstan) Kazybek Mukhituly - Zhetisay
- (Kazakhstan) Beknur Ryskul - Zhetisay
- (Kazakhstan) Rinat Serikkul - Zhetisay

Own goal

- (Kazakhstan) Alikhan Serikbay - Okzhetpes vs Khan-Tengri 18 March 2024
