= 2023 FC Aktobe season =

FC Aktobe
2023 season
- Stadium: Central Stadium
- Premier League: 3rd
- Kazakhstan Cup: 1/8-finals vs FC Atyrau Champions
- Europa Conference League: Second Qualifying round vs FC Torpedo Kutaisi Total, 5–3; Third Qualifying round vs Sepsi OSK Total score, 1–2
- Top goalscorer: Arman Kenesov (6)
- Highest home attendance: 12,800 vs FC Ordabasy ( 16 September 2023)
- Lowest home attendance: 12,000 vs FC Maktaaral ( 25 June 2023)
- Average home league attendance: 12,522 (29 October 2023)--->
Home colours	Away colours

The 2023 FC Aktobe season was the 28th successive season that FC Aktobe played in the Kazakhstan Premier League, the highest tier of association football in Kazakhstan.

== Transfers ==
In: Note: Flags indicate national team as defined under FIFA eligibility rules; some limited exceptions apply. Players may hold more than one non-FIFA nationality.

No.	Pos.	Nation	Player
4	DF	GEO	Luka Gadrani (from (Kazakhstan) Taraz)
5	MF	ARG	Leonel Strumia (from (Latvia) Liepāja)
9	FW	KAZ	Abylaykhan Zhumabek (from (Kazakhstan) Taraz)
15	MF	CIV	Anderson Niangbo (on loan from (Belgium) Gent)
17	FW	RUS	Idris Umayev (on loan from (Russia) Akhmat Grozny)
19	MF	MNE	Miloš Raičković (from (Russia) Akhmat Grozny)
21	FW	CRO	Andrija Filipović (from (Kazakhstan) Atyrau)
23	DF	RUS	Daniil Penchikov (from (Russia) Pari NN)
41	GK	RUS	Miroslav Lobantsev (from (Kazakhstan) Kyzylzhar)
88	DF	RUS	Dmitri Yashin (from (Belarus) Torpedo-BelAZ Zhodino)
93	FW	BRA	Élder Santana (from (Portugal) Gil Vicente)

Out: Note: Flags indicate national team as defined under FIFA eligibility rules; some limited exceptions apply. Players may hold more than one non-FIFA nationality.

No.	Pos.	Nation	Player
7	FW	UKR	Vitaliy Balashov
9	FW	BRA	China (loan return to (Ukraine) Lviv)
20	GK	SRB	Saša Stamenković
21	FW	GHA	Ernest Antwi
22	FW	RWA	Gerard Gohou
23	DF	KAZ	Temirlan Yerlanov (to (Kazakhstan) Ordabasy)
25	MF	LBR	Joachim Adukor
26	MF	KAZ	Ramazan Orazov (to (Kazakhstan) Aksu)
27	DF	KAZ	Yury Logvinenko (Retired)
28	FW	RUS	Serder Serderov (loan return to (Croatia) Istra 1961)
30	DF	MDA	Vladimir Ghinaitis
55	GK	KAZ	Evgeniy Sitdikov
88	MF	RUS	Ruslan Kambolov

== Current squad ==
As of 7 January 2024

Note: Flags indicate national team as defined under FIFA eligibility rules; some limited exceptions apply. Players may hold more than one non-FIFA nationality.

No.	Pos.	Nation	Player
2	DF	KAZ	Timur Rudoselsky
3	MF	BLR	Dmitry Bessmertny
5	MF	ARG	Leonel Strumia
6	DF	KAZ	Alibek Kasym
7	MF	KAZ	Bauyrzhan Baytana
9	FW	KAZ	Abylaykhan Zhumabek
10	MF	KAZ	Maksim Samorodov
12	DF	KAZ	Alisher Azhimov
14	DF	KAZ	Yeskendir Kybyrai
21	FW	CRO	Andrija Filipović

No.	Pos.	Nation	Player
30	MF	KAZ	Dias Andyrmash
31	DF	KAZ	Adilkhan Tanzharikov
55	GK	KAZ	Alisher Mambetzhanov
76	MF	KAZ	Nurdaulet Izbasarov
77	DF	KAZ	Dmitry Shomko
80	MF	KAZ	Arman Kenesov
99	FW	RUS	Roman Izotov
—	GK	KAZ	Evgeniy Sitdikov
—	DF	KAZ	Bagdat Kairov
