= Timur Rudoselsky =

Kazakh footballer

Personal information
- Full name: Timur Yevgenyevich Rudoselsky
- Date of birth: 21 December 1994 (age 31)
- Place of birth: Almaty, Kazakhstan
- Height: 1.91 m (6 ft 3 in)
- Position: Defender

Team information
- Current team: Shakhter Karagandy
- Number: 44

Youth career
- 2011: Okzhetpes
- 2011: Maccabi Haifa
- 2011–2014: Kairat

Senior career*
Years	Team	Apps	(Gls)
2014–2018	Kairat	61	(0)
2018	Zhetysu	2	(0)
2018–2019	Hapoel Petah Tikva	10	(1)
2019–2020	Okzhetpes	11	(1)
2020	Kaisar	0	(0)
2020–2021	Lori	12	(1)
2021	Kaisar	9	(0)
2021	Sevan	12	(0)
2022	Noravank	13	(2)
2022	Turan	9	(0)
2023	Alashkert	9	(0)
2023–2024	Aktobe	2	(0)
2024	Ekibastuz	13	(1)
2024	West Armenia	10	(0)
2025	Zhetysu	7	(0)
2025–	Shakhter Karagandy	12	(1)

International career^{‡}
2014–2016	Kazakhstan U21	23	(0)
- * Club domestic league appearances and goals as of 2 November 2025 ‡ National team caps and goals as of 11 October 2016

Timur Yevgenyevich Rudoselsky (Russian: Тимур Евгеньевич Рудосельский, Hebrew: טימור רודוסלסקי; born 21 December 1994) is a Kazakh professional footballer who plays as a defender for Kazakhstan First League club Shakhter Karagandy.

== Career ==
On 6 February 2019, Rudoselsky signed for Okzhetpes on a contract until the end of the 2019 season.

In March 2020, Rudoselsky signed for Belarusian Premier League club Smolevichi. However a week later Rudoselsky's contract was cancelled as he was unable to leave Kazakhstan to join up with his new club due to travel restrictions imposed in relation to the COVID-19 pandemic.

On 21 August 2020, Lori FC announced the signing of Rudoselsky from Kaisar. Following Lori's resignation from the Armenian Premier League on 5 April 2021, Rudoselsky returned to Kaisar on 14 April 2021.

On 28 July 2021, Rudoselsky returned to Armenia, signing for Sevan.

On 19 February 2022, Noravank announced the singing of Rudoselsky.

On 27 January 2023, Alashkert announced the singing of Rudoselsky. On 23 July 2023, Rudoselsky left Alashkert.

== Career statistics ==
=== Club ===
As of match played 10 August 2025.

Club	Season	League			National Cup		League Cup		Continental		Other		Total	
Club	Season	Division	Apps	Goals	Apps	Goals	Apps	Goals	Apps	Goals	Apps	Goals	Apps	Goals
Kairat	2013	Kazakhstan Premier League	0	0	0	0	-		-		-		0	0
Kairat	2014	Kazakhstan Premier League	5	0	2	0	-		0 (Note: Appearances in the UEFA Europa League)	0	-		7	0
Kairat	2015	Kazakhstan Premier League	30	0	5	0	-		1	0	1 (Note: Appearances in the Kazakhstan Super Cup)	0	37	0
Kairat	2016	Kazakhstan Premier League	22	0	3	0	-		0	0	0	0	25	0
Kairat	2017	Kazakhstan Premier League	4	0	1	0	-		1	0	1	0	7	0
Kairat	Total		61	0	11	0	-	-	2	0	2	0	76	0
Zhetysu	2018	Kazakhstan Premier League	2	0	1	0	-		-		-		3	0
Hapoel Petah Tikva	2018–19	Liga Leumit	10	1	0	0	0	0	–		–		10	1
Okzhetpes	2019	Kazakhstan Premier League	11	1	1	0	-		-		-		12	1
Smolevichi	2020	Belarusian Premier League	0	0	0	0	-		-		-		0	0
Kaisar	2020	Kazakhstan Premier League	0	0	0	0	-		-		-		0	0
Lori	2020–21	Armenian Premier League	12	1	1	0	-		-		-		13	1
Kaisar	2021	Kazakhstan Premier League	9	0	0	0	-		-		-		9	0
Sevan	2021–22	Armenian Premier League	12	0	1	0	-		-		-		13	0
Noravank	2021–22	Armenian Premier League	13	2	2	1	-		-		-		15	3
Turan	2022	Kazakhstan Premier League	9	0	3	0	-		-		-		12	0
Alashkert	2022–23	Armenian Premier League	9	0	0	0	-		0 (Note: Appearances in the UEFA Conference League)	0	-		9	0
Aktobe	2023	Kazakhstan Premier League	2	0	0	0	-		-		-		2	0
Aktobe	2024	Kazakhstan Premier League	0	0	0	0	-		0	0	-		0	0
Aktobe	Total		2	0	0	0	-	-	0	0	-	-	2	0
Ekibastuz	2024	Kazakhstan First League	13	1	0	0	-		-		-		13	1
West Armenia	2024–25	Armenian Premier League	10	0	1	1	-		0	0	-		11	1
Zhetysu	2025	Kazakhstan Premier League	7	0	0	0	-		-		-		7	0
Shakhter Karagandy	2025	Kazakhstan First League	6	1	0	0	-		-		-		6	1
Career total			173	6	21	2	-	-	2	0	2	0	198	8

== Honours ==
Noravank

- Armenian Cup: 2021–22
