= Amadou Doumbouya =

Guinean footballer

Personal information
- Date of birth: 12 October 2002 (age 24)
- Place of birth: Kindia, Guinea
- Height: 1.72 m (5 ft 8 in)
- Position: Midfielder

Team information
- Current team: Dinamo Samarqand
- Number: 16

Senior career*
Years	Team	Apps	(Gls)
2022	Djurgården	8	(0)
2023–2024	Botev Plovdiv	5	(0)
2024–2026	Aktobe	38	(2)
2026–	Dinamo Samarqand	5	(0)
- * Club domestic league appearances and goals as of 5 September 2026

Amadou Doumbouya (born 12 October 2002) is a Guinean professional professional footballer who plays for Uzbekistani club Dinamo Samarqand as a midfielder.

== Career ==
Doumbouya signed a five-year contract with Djurgården in March 2022. He made his Allsvenskan debut for Djurgården in a 4–0 victory home against Varbergs BoIS.

Doumbouya played in the 2022–23 UEFA Europa Conference League when he was substituted for Haris Radetinac in the second game against Romanian side Sepsi OSK Sfântu Gheorghe on 11 August 2022. He scored the 1–1 equalizer in the second group stage game of the Conference League home against Molde FK on 15 September.

In November 2022, Doumbouya was convicted for petty drug possession and not convicted for rape allegations and photographic activity constituting invasion of privacy allegations for an incident in October the same year. Doumbouya's contract with Djurgården was terminated in January 2023.

Doumbouya relocated to the Bulgarian First League after his spell in Sweden came to an abrupt end. He signed contract with Bulgarian team Botev Plovdiv.

On 26 February 2024, Kazakhstan Premier League club Aktobe announced the singing of Doumbouya from Botev Plovdiv. On 29 January 2026, Aktobe announced the termination of Doumbouya's contract by mutual agreement.

== Honours ==
Aktobe

- Kazakhstan Cup: 2024
