= Fatkhullo Olimzoda =

Tajikistani footballer (born 2005)

Personal information
- Full name: Fatkhullo Hursed Olimzoda
- Date of birth: 3 August 2005 (age 21)
- Place of birth: Tajikistan
- Height: 1.75 m (5 ft 9 in)
- Position: Midfielder

Team information
- Current team: Ravshan Kulob
- Number: 30

Senior career*
Years	Team	Apps	(Gls)
2022–2023	Dynamo Dushanbe		
2023	Ravshan Kulob	10	(1)
2023–2024	Atyrau	14	(0)
2025	Arsenal Dzerzhinsk	9	(0)
2026–	Ravshan Kulob	1	(0)

International career^{‡}
2024–	Tajikistan	5	(0)
- * Club domestic league appearances and goals as of 8 March 2026 ‡ National team caps and goals as of 24 March 2025

Fatkhullo Hursed Olimzoda (Tajik: Фатхулло Хуршед Олимзода, born 3 August 2005) is a Tajikistani professional football player for Tajikistan Higher League club Ravshan Kulob and the Tajikistan national team.

== Career ==
=== Club ===
On 4 August 2023, Kazakhstan Premier League club Atyrau announced the signing of Olimzoda.

On 21 March 2025, Belarusian Premier League club Arsenal Dzerzhinsk announced the signing of Olimzoda.

On 5 March 2026, Ravshan Kulob announced the signing of Olimzoda to a one-year contract.

=== International career ===
Olimzoda made his senior debut for Tajikistan on 6 June 2024, coming on as a 97th-minute substitute for Rustam Soirov in Tajikistans 3-0 FIFA World Cup qualification match against Jordan.

== Career statistics ==
As of match played 15 September 2024

Appearances and goals by club, season and competition
Club	Season	League			National cup (Note: Includes Kazakhstan Cup)		League cup (Note: Includes Kazakhstan League Cup)		Continental		Other		Total	
Club	Season	Division	Apps	Goals	Apps	Goals	Apps	Goals	Apps	Goals	Apps	Goals	Apps	Goals
Ravshan Kulob	2023	Tajikistan Higher League	10	1	0	0	—		—		—		10	1
Atyrau	2024	Kazakhstan Premier League	14	0	3	1	1	0	—		—		18	1
Arsenal Dzerzhinsk	2025	Belarusian Premier League	0	0	0	0	—		—		—		0	0
Career total			24	0	3	1	1	0	0	0	0	0	28	1

=== International ===
As of match played 14 October 2024

National team	Year	Apps	Goals
Tajikistan	2024	1	0
Total		1	0
