= Gaby Kiki =

Cameroonian footballer

Personal information
- Full name: Gaby Junior Kiki
- Date of birth: 15 February 1995 (age 31)
- Place of birth: Yaoundé, Cameroon
- Height: 1.94 m (6 ft 4 in)
- Position: Defender

Team information
- Current team: Zakho
- Number: 15

Youth career
- Boms FC

Senior career*
Years	Team	Apps	(Gls)
2015–2016	Eding Sport		
2017–2018	Dnepr Mogilev	35	(0)
2018–2020	Dinamo Brest	58	(4)
2021	Rukh Brest	23	(1)
2022–2023	Sheriff Tiraspol	33	(4)
2024–2025	Aktobe	29	(1)
2025–	Zakho		
- * Club domestic league appearances and goals as of 5 July 2025

Gaby Junior Kiki (born 15 February 1995) is a Cameroonian professional footballer who plays for Iraq Stars League club Zakho SC.

== Career ==
On 23 January 2024, Kazakhstan Premier League club Aktobe announced the signing of Kiki.

On 8 September 2025, Iraq Stars League club Zakho SC announced the signing of Kiki.

== Honours ==
Dinamo Brest

- Belarusian Premier League: 2019
- Belarusian Super Cup: 2019, 2020

Sheriff Tiraspol

- Moldovan Liga: 2021–22, 2022–23
- Moldovan Cup: 2021–22, 2022–23

Aktobe

- Kazakhstan Cup: 2024
