= Jakob Novak =

Slovenian footballer (born 1998)

Personal information
- Date of birth: 4 March 1998 (age 28)
- Place of birth: Ljubljana, Slovenia
- Height: 1.88 m (6 ft 2 in)
- Position: Midfielder

Youth career
- –2017: Olimpija Ljubljana

Senior career*
Years	Team	Apps	(Gls)
2015–2018	Olimpija Ljubljana	9	(0)
2017–2018	→ Rudar Velenje (loan)	27	(3)
2018–2021	Celje	76	(2)
2021–2022	Boluspor	19	(1)
2023–2024	Atyrau	46	(3)
2025	Oțelul Galați	0	(0)
2025	→ Jenis (loan)	0	(0)

International career
2014–2015	Slovenia U17 (Note: Appearances in competitive UEFA matches only.)	7	(0)
2015–2016	Slovenia U19	6	(1)
2019	Slovenia U21	1	(0)
- * Club domestic league appearances and goals as of 1 July 2025

Jakob Novak (born 4 March 1998) is a Slovenian professional footballer who plays as a midfielder.

== Club career ==
Novak made his professional debut in the Slovenian PrvaLiga for Olimpija Ljubljana on 18 July 2015 in a game against Gorica.

In February 2023, Novak joined Kazakhstan Premier League side Atyrau.

== Honours ==
Olimpija Ljubljana

- Slovenian PrvaLiga: 2015–16
- Slovenian Cup runner-up: 2016–17

Celje

- Slovenian PrvaLiga: 2019–20
- Slovenian Cup runner-up: 2020–21

Atyrau

- Kazakhstan Cup runner-up: 2024
