= Dorny Romero =

Dominican footballer (born 1998)

Personal information
- Full name: Dorny Alexander Romero Chalas
- Date of birth: 24 January 1998 (age 28)
- Place of birth: El Seibo, Dominican Republic
- Height: 1.73 m (5 ft 8 in)
- Position: Forward

Team information
- Current team: Bolívar
- Number: 77

Youth career
- 2012–2017: El Seibo

Senior career*
Years	Team	Apps	(Gls)
2017	Delfines del Este		
2017–2020	Cibao	34+	(16)
2020–2021	Venados	16	(0)
2021–2022	Real Santa Cruz	51	(17)
2023–2024	Always Ready	32	(25)
2024–2025	Aktobe	22	(5)
2025–	Bolívar	46	(24)

International career^{‡}
2019–2021	Dominican Republic U23	3+	(3)
2019–	Dominican Republic	54	(29)
- * Club domestic league appearances and goals as of 4 November 2026 ‡ National team caps and goals as of 17 November 2026

Dorny Alexander Romero Chalas (born 24 January 1998) is a Dominican professional footballer who plays as a forward for División Profesional club Bolívar and the Dominican Republic national team.

== Early life ==
Dorny Romero was born in Santo Domingo on 4 September 1995. He lived in El Seibo and studied at Sergio A. Beras High School. He began playing football at age 14 at Jean Anubi Football School. Although he had first aspired to be a baseball player, Romero developed a passion for football and pursued it professionally.

== Career ==
Romero signed his first professional contract with Delfines del Este FC in 2017 and within that same season, he signed with Cibao FC. He played two friendly games against Cuba, putting in outstanding performances and scoring both winning goals.

Romero made his professional debut for the Dominican Republic national football team in a 1–0 friendly win over Guadeloupe on 15 February 2019. He wore the Cibao shirt until the summer of 2020, when he played the first phase of the Caribbean Club Championship in Jamaica, a tournament that gives access to the most important cups on the continent such as the CONCACAF Champions League and the CONCACAF League.

On 4 September 2020, the striker was announced by Venados of the Mexican soccer Liga de Ascenso, as his new acquisition to reinforce the attack of the entire state of Yucatán. Romero signed a two-year contract with the option of a third with the Mexican squad.

On 13 March 2024, Kazakhstan Premier League club Aktobe announced the signing of Romero to a three-year contract.

On 27 January 2025, Romero returned to the Bolivian Primera División, with Club Bolívar announcing his signing.

== Career statistics ==
=== Club ===
Appearances and goals by club, season and competition
Club	Season	League			National cup		Continental		Total	
Club	Season	Division	Apps	Goals	Apps	Goals	Apps	Goals	Apps	Goals
Cibao	2018	LDF	13	5	–		–		13	5
Cibao	2019	LDF	21	10	–		–		21	10
Cibao	2020	LDF	–		–		2	0	2	0
Cibao	Total		34	15	0	0	2	0	36	15
Venados	2020–21	Liga de Expansión MX	16	0	–		–		16	0
Real Santa Cruz	2021	Bolivian Primera División	17	1	–		–		17	1
Real Santa Cruz	2022	Bolivian Primera División	34	16	–		–		34	16
Real Santa Cruz	Total		51	17	0	0	0	0	51	17
Always Ready	2023	Bolivian Primera División	32	25	12	2	0	0	46	29
Always Ready	2024	Bolivian Primera División	–		–		3	2	3	2
Always Ready	Total		32	25	12	4	5	2	49	31
Aktobe	2024	Kazakhstan Premier League	22	5	7	2	2	0	31	7
Club Bolívar	2025	Bolivian Primera División	25	15	19	14	9	2	53	31
Club Bolívar	2026	Bolivian Primera División	21	9	3	1	9	1	33	11
Club Bolívar	Total		46	24	22	15	18	3	86	42
Career total			203	86	41	21	27	5	270	112

=== International ===
As of match played 17 November 2026

Appearances and goals by national team and year
National team	Year	Apps	Goals
Dominican Republic	2019	9	1
Dominican Republic	2020	0	0
Dominican Republic	2021	5	2
Dominican Republic	2022	6	3
Dominican Republic	2023	9	6
Dominican Republic	2024	8	12
Dominican Republic	2025	10	2
Dominican Republic	2026	7	3
Total		54	29

Scores and results list Dominican Republic's goal tally first, score column indicates score after each Romero goal.

List of international goals scored by Dorny Romero
No.	Date	Venue	Opponent	Score	Result	Competition
1	12 October 2019	Félix Sánchez Olympic Stadium, Santo Domingo, Dominican Republic	Saint Lucia	2–0	3–0	2019–20 CONCACAF Nations League B
2	27 March 2021	Inter Miami CF Stadium, Fort Lauderdale, United States	Anguilla	1–0	6–0	2022 FIFA World Cup qualification
3	27 March 2021	Inter Miami CF Stadium, Fort Lauderdale, United States	Anguilla	3–0	6–0	2022 FIFA World Cup qualification
4	2 June 2022	FFB Stadium, Belmopan, Belize	Belize	2–0	2–0	2022–23 CONCACAF Nations League B
5	5 June 2022	Félix Sánchez Olympic Stadium, Santo Domingo, Dominican Republic	French Guiana	1–1	2–3	2022–23 CONCACAF Nations League B
6	18 November 2022	Estadio Panamericano, San Cristóbal, Dominican Republic	Cuba	1–0	1–1	Friendly
7	11 September 2023	Félix Sánchez Olympic Stadium, Santo Domingo, Dominican Republic	Montserrat	1–0	3–0	2023–24 CONCACAF Nations League B
8	11 September 2023	Félix Sánchez Olympic Stadium, Santo Domingo, Dominican Republic	Montserrat	3–0	3–0	2023–24 CONCACAF Nations League B
9	13 October 2023	Wildey Turf, Wildey, Barbados	Barbados	1–0	5–0	2023–24 CONCACAF Nations League B
10	16 October 2023	Estadio Cibao FC, Santiago de los Caballeros, Dominican Republic	Barbados	2–1	5–2	2023–24 CONCACAF Nations League B
11	16 October 2023	Estadio Cibao FC, Santiago de los Caballeros, Dominican Republic	Barbados	3–1	5–2	2023–24 CONCACAF Nations League B
12	16 October 2023	Estadio Cibao FC, Santiago de los Caballeros, Dominican Republic	Barbados	5–2	5–2	2023–24 CONCACAF Nations League B
13	11 June 2024	Estadio Panamericano, San Cristóbal, Dominican Republic	British Virgin Islands	2–0	4–0	2026 FIFA World Cup qualification
14	11 June 2024	Estadio Panamericano, San Cristóbal, Dominican Republic	British Virgin Islands	4–0	4–0	2026 FIFA World Cup qualification
15	7 September 2024	ABFA Technical Center, Piggotts, Antigua and Barbuda	Bermuda	1–1	3–2	2024–25 CONCACAF Nations League B
16	10 September 2024	ABFA Technical Center, Piggotts, Antigua and Barbuda	Dominica	2–0	2–0	2024–25 CONCACAF Nations League B
17	12 October 2024	Bermuda National Stadium, Devonshire Parish, Bermuda	Antigua and Barbuda	2–0	5–0	2024–25 CONCACAF Nations League B
18	15 October 2024	Bermuda National Stadium, Devonshire Parish, Bermuda	Antigua and Barbuda	3–0	5–0	2024–25 CONCACAF Nations League B
19	16 November 2024	Estadio Cibao FC, Santiago, Dominican Republic	Dominica	1–0	6–1	2024–25 CONCACAF Nations League B
20	16 November 2024	Estadio Cibao FC, Santiago, Dominican Republic	Dominica	4–1	6–1	2024–25 CONCACAF Nations League B
21	19 November 2024	Estadio Cibao FC, Santiago de los Caballeros, Dominican Republic	Bermuda	1–0	6–1	2024–25 CONCACAF Nations League B
22	19 November 2024	Estadio Cibao FC, Santiago de los Caballeros, Dominican Republic	Bermuda	2–1	6–1	2024–25 CONCACAF Nations League B
23	19 November 2024	Estadio Cibao FC, Santiago de los Caballeros, Dominican Republic	Bermuda	5–1	6–1	2024–25 CONCACAF Nations League B
24	19 November 2024	Estadio Cibao FC, Santiago de los Caballeros, Dominican Republic	Bermuda	6–1	6–1	2024–25 CONCACAF Nations League B
25	6 June 2025	Estadio Cementos Progreso, Guatemala City, Guatemala	Guatemala	1–1	2–4	2026 FIFA World Cup qualification
26	10 June 2025	Félix Sánchez Olympic Stadium, Santo Domingo, Dominican Republic	Dominica	1–0	5–0	2026 FIFA World Cup qualification
27	26 March 2026	Estadio Cibao FC, Santiago, Dominican Republic	El Salvador	2–2	2–2	2025–26 CONCACAF Series
28	29 March 2026	Estadio Cibao FC, Santiago, Dominican Republic	Cuba	1–1	1–1	2025–26 CONCACAF Series
29	1 October 2026	Félix Sánchez Olympic Stadium, Santo Domingo, Dominican Republic	Haiti	1–2	1–4	2026–27 CONCACAF Nations League A
