= Maksim Samorodov =

Kazakhstani footballer (born 2002)

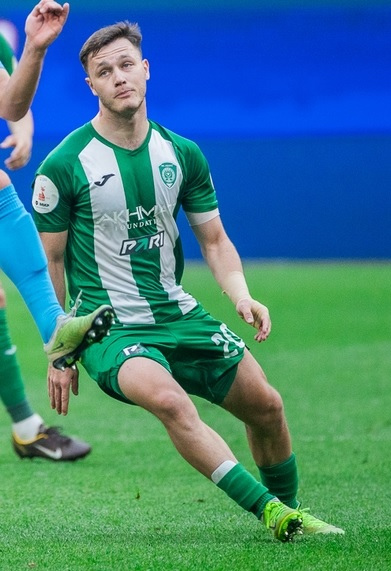
- Samorodov with Akhmat in 2025

Personal information
- Full name: Maksim Ivanovich Samorodov
- Date of birth: 29 June 2002 (age 24)
- Place of birth: Aktobe, Kazakhstan
- Height: 1.74 m (5 ft 9 in)
- Position: Right winger

Team information
- Current team: Akhmat Grozny
- Number: 20

Youth career
- –2019: Aktobe

Senior career*
Years	Team	Apps	(Gls)
2019	Aktobe U21	24	(7)
2019–2024	Aktobe	94	(18)
2024–	Akhmat Grozny	66	(11)

International career^{‡}
2018	Kazakhstan U17	3	(0)
2021	Kazakhstan U21	3	(2)
2021–	Kazakhstan	37	(6)
- * Club domestic league appearances and goals as of 21 November 2026 ‡ National team caps and goals as of 14 November 2026

Maksim Ivanovich Samorodov (Russian: Максим Иванович Самородов; born 29 June 2002) is a Kazakh footballer who plays as a right winger for Russian club Akhmat Grozny and the Kazakhstan national team. He can also play as centre-forward or left winger.

== Club career ==
On 6 August 2024, Samorodov signed a four-year contract with Russian Premier League club Akhmat Grozny, reuniting with Magomed Adiyev, who was his coach at the Kazakhstan national team.

== International career ==
Samorodov made his international debut for Kazakhstan on 28 March 2021 in a 2022 FIFA World Cup qualification match against France, which finished as a 2–0 home loss. Samorodov scored his first international goal in an UEFA Euro 2024 qualifying match against Slovenia, which ended as a 2–1 home loss.

== Career statistics ==
=== Club ===
As of match played 21 November 2026

Appearances and goals by club, season and competition
Club	Season	League			National Cup (Note: Includes Kazakhstan Cup, Russian Cup)		Continental		Other		Total	
Club	Season	Division	Apps	Goals	Apps	Goals	Apps	Goals	Apps	Goals	Apps	Goals
Aktobe	2019	Kazakhstan Premier League	3	0	0	0	—		—		3	0
Aktobe	2021	Kazakhstan Premier League	21	3	6	1	—		—		27	4
Aktobe	2022	Kazakhstan Premier League	22	3	6	0	—		—		28	3
Aktobe	2023	Kazakhstan Premier League	24	5	2	0	4 (Note: Appearances in UEFA Conference League)	2	—		30	5
Aktobe	2024	Kazakhstan Premier League	13	5	4	2	2	0	—		19	7
Aktobe	Total		83	16	18	3	6	2	—		107	19
Akhmat Grozny	2024–25	Russian Premier League	24	6	6	2	—		2 (Note: Appearance in the relegation play-offs)	0	32	8
Akhmat Grozny	2025–26	Russian Premier League	29	5	5	0	—		—		34	5
Akhmat Grozny	2026–27	Russian Premier League	13	0	2	1	—		—		15	1
Akhmat Grozny	Total		66	11	13	3	0	0	2	0	81	14
Career total			149	27	31	6	6	2	2	0	188	33

=== International ===
As of 13 November 2026

Kazakhstan
Year	Apps	Goals
2021	1	0
2022	2	0
2023	9	2
2024	9	1
2025	10	2
2026	6	1
Total	37	6

==== International goals ====
No.	Date	Venue	Opponent	Score	Result	Competition
1.	23 March 2023	Astana Arena, Astana, Kazakhstan	Slovenia	1–0	1–2	UEFA Euro 2024 qualification
2.	10 September 2023	Astana Arena, Astana, Kazakhstan	Northern Ireland	1–0	1–0	UEFA Euro 2024 qualification
3.	11 June 2024	Haladás Sportkomplexum, Szombathely, Hungary	Azerbaijan	2–0	2–3	Friendly
4.	19 March 2025	Gloria Sports Arena, Antalya, Turkey	Curaçao	1–0	2–0	Friendly
5.	25 March 2025	Rheinpark Stadion, Vaduz, Liechtenstein	Liechtenstein	1–0	2–0	2026 FIFA World Cup qualification
6.	6 June 2026	Vazgen Sargsyan Republican Stadium, Yerevan, Armenia	Armenia	1–0	1–1	Friendly

== Honours ==
Aktobe

- Kazakhstan Cup: 2024

Individual

- Russian Premier League Goal of the Month: November/December 2024 (scored against Krylia Sovetov on 24 November 2024).
