= Anton Shramchenko =

Belarusian footballer

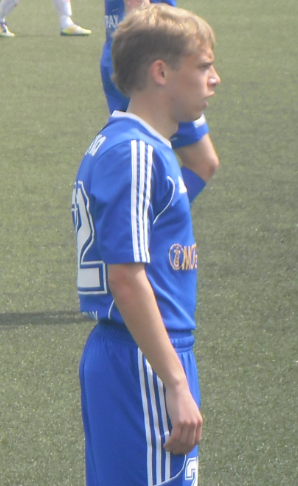

Personal information
- Date of birth: 12 March 1993 (age 33)
- Place of birth: Rogachev, Gomel Oblast, Belarus
- Height: 1.65 m (5 ft 5 in)
- Position: Forward

Team information
- Current team: Isloch Minsk Raion
- Number: 8

Youth career
- 2010–2011: Dnepr Mogilev

Senior career*
Years	Team	Apps	(Gls)
2011–2014	Dnepr Mogilev	78	(9)
2012	→ Dnepr-2 Mogilev	14	(11)
2015	Belshina Bobruisk	24	(3)
2016	Dinamo Minsk	6	(1)
2017	Dnepr Mogilev	28	(4)
2018–2019	Gomel	57	(5)
2020–2022	Minsk	83	(12)
2023	Shakhtyor Soligorsk	12	(3)
2023	Maktaaral	10	(1)
2024	Zhetysu	18	(2)
2025	Dinamo Brest	17	(1)
2026–	Isloch Minsk Raion	10	(2)

International career
2013–2014	Belarus U21	10	(3)
- * Club domestic league appearances and goals as of 3 July 2026

Anton Shramchenko (Belarusian: Антон Шрамчанка; Russian: Антон Шрамченко; born 12 March 1993) is a Belarusian footballer who plays for Isloch Minsk Raion.

== Honours ==
Shakhtyor Soligorsk

- Belarusian Super Cup winner: 2023
