= Freddy Góndola =

Panamanian footballer (born 1995)

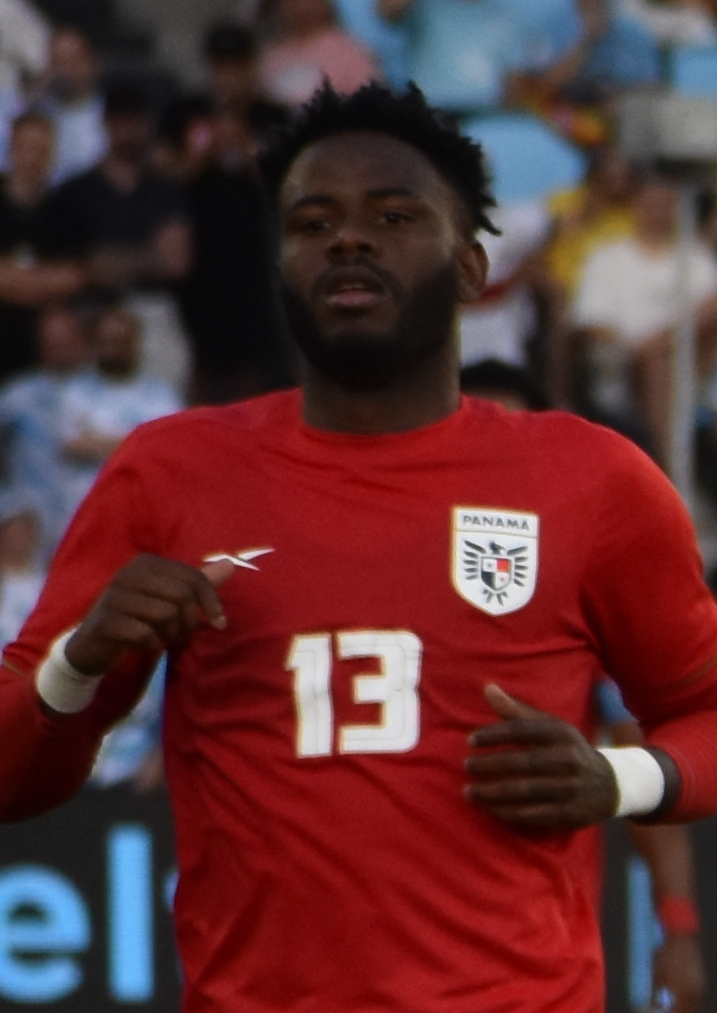
- Góndola with Panama in 2024

Personal information
- Full name: Freddy Elías Góndola Smith
- Date of birth: 18 September 1995 (age 31)
- Place of birth: Panama City, Panama
- Height: 1.86 m (6 ft 1 in)
- Position: Forward

Team information
- Current team: Aktobe
- Number: 99

Senior career*
Years	Team	Apps	(Gls)
2016	Belén	10	(0)
2017–2018	La Piedad		
2018	Universitario	12	(1)
2019	La Piedad		
2019–2020	Tauro	18	(4)
2020–2021	Yaracuyanos	20	(6)
2021	Deportivo Táchira	19	(6)
2022–2024	Alajuelense	91	(18)
2024	Maccabi Bnei Reineh	16	(1)
2024–	Aktobe	16	(2)

International career^{‡}
2021–	Panama	27	(1)
Medal record
Men's football
Representing Panama
CONCACAF Gold Cup
Runner-up	2023 United States–Canada	Team
- * Club domestic league appearances and goals as of 12 July 2025 ‡ National team caps and goals as of 15 October 2024

Freddy Elías Góndola Smith, known as El Tanque (born 18 September 1995) is a Panamanian professional footballer who plays as a forward for Kazakhstan Premier League club Aktobe and the Panama national team.

== International career ==
Góndola made his debut for the Panama national team on 7 October 2021 in a World Cup qualifier against El Salvador.

== Career statistics ==
As of match played 15 October 2024

Appearances and goals by national team and year
National team	Year	Apps	Goals
Panama	2021	5	1
Panama	2022	8	0
Panama	2023	4	0
Panama	2024	7	0
Total		24	1

No.	Date	Venue	Opponent	Score	Result	Competition
1	16 November 2021	Estadio Rommel Fernández, Panama City, Panama	El Salvador	2–1	2–1	2022 FIFA World Cup qualification

== Honours ==
Panama

- CONCACAF Gold Cup runner-up: 2023
