= Ramazan Orazov =

Kazakhstani footballer (born 1998)

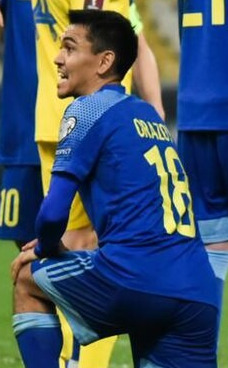
- Orazov with Kazakhstan in 2021

Personal information
- Full name: Ramazan Sarlybekuly Orazov
- Date of birth: 30 January 1998 (age 28)
- Place of birth: Almaty, Kazakhstan
- Height: 1.72 m (5 ft 8 in)
- Position: Midfielder

Team information
- Current team: Yelimay
- Number: 18

Youth career
- CSKA Almaty
- Kairat

Senior career*
Years	Team	Apps	(Gls)
2018–2019	Kairat	21	(0)
2020	BFC Daugavpils	3	(0)
2020–2021	Chayka Peschanokopskoye	12	(0)
2021–2023	Aktobe	28	(0)
2023	Aksu	5	(0)
2023	Tobol	12	(2)
2023–2024	Koper	12	(1)
2024	Aktobe	9	(0)
2024–2025	Silkeborg	16	(2)
2025	→ Yelimay (loan)	10	(2)
2026–	Yelimay	21	(4)

International career^{‡}
2014	Kazakhstan U17	3	(0)
2016	Kazakhstan U19	3	(0)
2018–2019	Kazakhstan U21	5	(0)
2021–	Kazakhstan	44	(2)
- * Club domestic league appearances and goals as of 1 November 2026 ‡ National team caps and goals as of 18:25, 13 November 2026 (UTC)

Ramazan Sarlybekuly Orazov (Kazakh: Рамазан Сарлыбекұлы Оразов; born 30 January 1998) is a Kazakh professional footballer who plays as a midfielder for Kazakhstan Premier League club Yelimay and the Kazakhstan national team.

== Club career ==
=== Kairat ===
On 18 July 2019, Orazov scored in added time for Kairat in the return leg of the Europa League first qualifying round to help Kairat advance against Široki Brijeg to the second round.

=== Chayka Peschanokopskoye ===
He made his debut in the Russian Football National League for Chayka Peschanokopskoye on 9 September 2020 in a game against Torpedo Moscow.

=== Aktobe ===
On 13 July 2021, Orazov signed for Aktobe.

=== Aksu ===
On 27 January 2023, he moved to fellow Kazakhstani club Aksu.

=== Tobol ===
In the summer of 2023, Orazov signed for Tobol. On 27 July 2023, in a Europa Conference League game away to Basel, he scored a long-range goal to help his team to a surprise 3–1 win.

=== Silkeborg ===
On 13 June 2024, Danish Superliga club Silkeborg announced that they had acquired Orazov on a free transfer, signing a contract until June 2027.

==== Loan to Yelimay ====
On 9 July 2025, Orazov joined Kazakhstan Premier League club Yelimay on loan until the end of 2025.

=== Yelimay ===
On 13 December 2025, Orazov signed for Yelimay on a permanent deal.

== International career ==
Orazov made his debut for the Kazakhstan national team on 31 March 2021 in a World Cup qualifier against Ukraine. He scored his first international goal on 20 November 2023 in a 2–1 loss to Slovenia during a UEFA Euro 2024 qualification match.

== Career statistics ==
=== Club ===
As of match played 7 March 2026

Club	Season	League			National Cup (Note: Includes Kazakhstan Cup, Latvian Cup, Russian Cup, Slovenian Cup, Danish Cup)		Continental		Other		Total	
Club	Season	Division	Apps	Goals	Apps	Goals	Apps	Goals	Apps	Goals	Apps	Goals
Kairat	2018	Kazakhstan Premier League	1	0	4	0	0	0	0	0	5	0
Kairat	2019	Kazakhstan Premier League	20	0	1	0	4 (Note: Appearances in UEFA Europa League)	1	1 (Note: Appearance in Kazakhstan Super Cup)	0	26	1
Kairat	Total		21	0	5	0	4	1	1	0	31	1
Daugavpils	2020	Virslīga	3	0	0	0	—		—		3	0
Chayka Peschanokopskoye	2020–21	Russian First League	12	0	0	0	—		—		12	0
Aktobe	2021	Kazakhstan Premier League	6	0	4	0	—		—		10	0
Aktobe	2022	Kazakhstan Premier League	22	0	5	0	—		—		27	0
Aktobe	Total		28	0	9	0	—		—		37	0
Aksu	2023	Kazakhstan Premier League	5	0	0	0	—		—		5	0
Tobol	2023	Kazakhstan Premier League	12	2	5	0	7 (Note: Appearances in UEFA Europa Conference League)	1	—		24	3
Koper	2023–24	1. SNL	12	1	0	0	—		—		12	1
Aktobe	2024	Kazakhstan Premier League	9	0	4	0	—		—		13	0
Silkeborg	2024–25	Danish Superliga	16	2	4	1	3 (Note: Two appearances in UEFA Europa League, one appearance in UEFA Conference League)	0	—		23	3
Yelimay (loan)	2025	Kazakhstan Premier League	10	2	—		—		—		10	2
Yelimay	2026	Kazakhstan Premier League	17	3	1	1	—		—		18	4
Career total			146	10	27	2	14	2	1	0	188	14

=== International ===
As of match played 2 October 2026

Appearances and goals by national team and year
National team	Year	Apps	Goals
Kazakhstan	2021	5	0
Kazakhstan	2022	7	0
Kazakhstan	2023	10	1
Kazakhstan	2024	8	0
Kazakhstan	2025	6	0
Kazakhstan	2026	6	1
Total		42	2

As of match played 9 June 2026
Kazakhstan score listed first, score column indicates score after each Orazov goal

List of international goals scored by Ramazan Orazov
No.	Date	Venue	Cap	Opponent	Score	Result	Competition
1	20 November 2023	Stožice Stadium, Ljubljana, Slovenia	22	Slovenia	1–1	1–2	UEFA Euro 2024 qualification
2	31 March 2026	Astana Arena, Astana, Kazakhstan	38	Comoros	1–0	1–0	2026 FIFA Series

== Honours ==
Kairat

- Kazakhstan Cup: 2018
