= Jayro Jean =

Haitian footballer (born 1998)

Personal information
- Full name: Jayro Hestefano Jean
- Date of birth: 22 June 1998 (age 28)
- Place of birth: Port-au-Prince, Haiti
- Height: 1.70 m (5 ft 7 in)
- Position: Winger

Team information
- Current team: Garudayaksa
- Number: 81

Youth career
- École Menard Jean Joseph

Senior career*
Years	Team	Apps	(Gls)
- Saint Louis
2018	América des Cayes		
2019–2020	San Cristóbal	11	(5)
2021	Jarabacoa	13	(4)
2021–2022	Real Santa Cruz	44	(7)
2023–2024	Always Ready	15	(1)
2023	→ Real Santa Cruz (loan)	10	(4)
2024	Aktobe	22	(4)
2025	Qadsia		
2025	Aktobe	24	(9)
2026	Al Ittihad Al Asskary	6	(0)
2026–	Garudayaksa	1	(0)

International career
2023–	Haiti	4	(0)
- * Club domestic league appearances and goals as of 10 October 2026

Jayro Hestefano Jean (born 22 June 1998) is a Haitian professional footballer who plays as a forward for Super League club Garudayaksa and the Haiti national team.

== Club career ==
Born in Port-au-Prince, Jean first took an interest in football at the age of nine, joining the École football Menard Jean Joseph. He had spells with Club Sportif Saint Louis and América des Cayes, before departing for the Dominican Republic, where he turned professional with San Cristóbal, winning the 'Revelation of the Year' award in 2019. He also played briefly for Jarabacoa before leaving to join Bolivian side Real Santa Cruz in 2021.

At the end of the 2022 season, it was announced that Jean would join fellow Bolivian Primera División side Always Ready, with the winger being brought on the club's European tour, before being involved in pre-season. Having featured in the Copa Libertadores, as Always Ready were knocked out in qualification by Chilean side Magallanes, Always Ready decided not to register Jean as one of their foreign players, and he returned to former club Real Santa Cruz on a loan deal in March 2023.

Following four goals in eleven appearances, he was recalled by Always Ready. Despite the coaching staff reportedly requesting the recall, the president of Real Santa Cruz, Carlos Sánchez, stated that negotiations were ongoing between the two clubs, in order to extend the loan deal. However, the president of Guabirá, Rafael Paz, claimed that Jean would be joining the Montero-based club on a loan deal.

On 16 January 2025, Aktobe announced that Jean had left the club to continue his career with Kuwait Premier League club Qadsia. On 26 February 2025, Aktobe announced the return of Jean to the club. On 30 December 2025, Aktobe announced that Jean had left the club after his contract had expired.

On 9 February 2026, Libyan Premier League club Al Ittihad Al Asskary announced the signing of Jean.

== International career ==
Having not represented Haiti at youth international level, Jean was called up to the full national team for the 2023 CONCACAF Gold Cup.

== Career statistics ==
=== Club ===
As of 29 July 2023.

Appearances and goals by club, season and competition
Club	Season	League			Cup		Continental		Other		Total	
Club	Season	Division	Apps	Goals	Apps	Goals	Apps	Goals	Apps	Goals	Apps	Goals
San Cristóbal	2020	LDF	11	5	0	0	–		0	0	11	5
Jarabacoa	2021	LDF	13	4	0	0	–		0	0	13	4
Real Santa Cruz	2021	Bolivian Primera División	12	2	0	0	–		0	0	12	2
Real Santa Cruz	2022	Bolivian Primera División	32	5	0	0	–		0	0	32	5
Real Santa Cruz	Total		44	7	0	0	0	0	0	0	44	7
Always Ready	2023	Bolivian Primera División	3	0	0	0	2 (Note: Appearances in the Copa Libertadores)	0	2 (Note: Appearances in the Copa Tiga)	1	7	1
Real Santa Cruz (loan)	2023	Bolivian Primera División	10	4	0	0	–		1	0	11	4
Career total			81	20	0	0	2	0	3	1	86	21

=== International ===
As of 29 July 2023

National team	Year	Apps	Goals
Haiti	2023	4	0
Total		4	0
