= Dmitry Bessmertny =

Belarusian footballer

Personal information
- Full name: Dmitry Sergeyevich Bessmertny
- Date of birth: 3 January 1997 (age 29)
- Place of birth: Minsk, Belarus
- Height: 1.75 m (5 ft 9 in)
- Position: Midfielder

Youth career
- 2013–2015: Minsk

Senior career*
Years	Team	Apps	(Gls)
2015–2018	Minsk	76	(6)
2019–2023	BATE Borisov	72	(6)
2023–2024	Aktobe	27	(0)
2025	Kuban Krasnodar	18	(1)

International career^{‡}
2013	Belarus U17		
2013–2014	Belarus U19		
2016–2018	Belarus U21	14	(0)
2017	Belarus B	1	(0)
2019–2022	Belarus	7	(0)
- * Club domestic league appearances and goals as of 14 June 2025 ‡ National team caps and goals as of 13 June 2022

Dmitry Sergeyevich Bessmertny (Belarusian: Дзмітрый Сяргеевіч Бяссмертны; Russian: Дмитрий Сергеевич Бессмертный; born 3 January 1997) is a Belarusian professional footballer who plays as a midfielder.

== Honours ==
BATE Borisov

- Belarusian Cup: 2019–20, 2020–21
- Belarusian Super Cup: 2022
