= Bagdat Kairov =

Kazakhstani footballer

Personal information
- Full name: Bagdat Sanatuly Kairov
- Date of birth: 27 April 1993 (age 33)
- Place of birth: Aktyubinsk, Kazakhstan
- Height: 1.80 m (5 ft 11 in)
- Position: Defender

Team information
- Current team: Aktobe
- Number: 5

Youth career
- –2011: Aktobe

Senior career*
Years	Team	Apps	(Gls)
2011–2012	Aktobe-Zhas	55	(2)
2013–2014	Aktobe	0	(0)
2015	Caspiy	19	(0)
2016–2019	Aktobe	103	(2)
2020–2021	Kaisar	20	(0)
2021	Ordabasy	14	(1)
2021–2023	Tobol	44	(0)
2024–	Aktobe	41	(1)

International career^{‡}
2021–	Kazakhstan	22	(0)
- * Club domestic league appearances and goals as of 1 November 2026 ‡ National team caps and goals as of 18 November 2025 (UTC)

Bagdat Sanatuly Kairov (Kazakh: Бағдат Санатұлы Қайыров, Bağdat Sanatūly Qaiyrov; born 27 April 1993) is a Kazakhstani professional footballer who plays for Aktobe.

== International career ==
He made his debut for Kazakhstan national football team on 13 November 2021 in a World Cup qualifier against France.
