= Alibek Kasym =

Kazakhstani footballer

Personal information
- Full name: Alibek Bekbayuly Kasym
- Date of birth: 27 May 1998 (age 28)
- Place of birth: Almaty, Kazakhstan
- Height: 1.93 m (6 ft 4 in)
- Position: Defender

Team information
- Current team: Astana
- Number: 6

Senior career*
| Years | Team | Apps | (Gls) |
| 2016–2020 | Kairat | 0 | (0) |
| 2020 | → Kyzylzhar (loan) | 13 | (1) |
| 2021–2022 | Kyzylzhar | 25 | (7) |
| 2022–2025 | Aktobe | 86 | (17) |
| 2026– | Astana | 22 | (2) |

International career^{‡}
| 2014 | Kazakhstan U17 | 3 | (0) |
| 2016 | Kazakhstan U19 | 2 | (0) |
| 2018–2020 | Kazakhstan U21 | 7 | (0) |
| 2021– | Kazakhstan | 19 | (2) |
- * Club domestic league appearances and goals as of 1 November 2026 ‡ National team caps and goals as of 14 November 2026

Alibek Bekbayuly Kasym (Kazakh: Әлібек Бекбайұлы Қасым, Älıbek Bekbaiūly Qasym; born 27 May 1998) is a Kazakhstani footballer who plays as a defender for Astana and the Kazakhstan national team.

== Career ==
Kasym made his professional debut with Akzhayik in a 5–3 Kazakhstan Cup win over FC Okzhetpes on 19 April 2018.

== International career ==
Kasym made his international debut for the Kazakhstan national team in a friendly 4–0 win loss to North Macedonia on 4 June 2021.

=== International goals ===
Scores and results list Kazakhstan's goal tally first.

| No. | Date | Venue | Opponent | Score | Result | Competition |
|---|---|---|---|---|---|---|
| 1. | 10 October 2025 | Astana Arena, Astana, Kazakhstan | Liechtenstein | 4–0 | 4–0 | 2026 FIFA World Cup qualification |
| 2. | 25 March 2026 | Astana Arena, Astana, Kazakhstan | Namibia | 1–0 | 2–0 | 2026 FIFA Series |
