= Arman Kenesov =

Kazakhstani footballer (born 2000)

Personal information
- Full name: Arman Serikuly Kenesov
- Date of birth: 4 September 2000 (age 26)
- Place of birth: Pavlodar, Kazakhstan
- Height: 1.72 m (5 ft 7 1/2 in)
- Position: Midfielder

Team information
- Current team: Turan (on loan from Aktobe)
- Number: 88

Youth career
- Irtysh Pavlodar

Senior career*
Years	Team	Apps	(Gls)
2018–2020	Irtysh Pavlodar	14	(1)
2020–2021	SKA-Khabarovsk	16	(0)
2021	→ Kaisar (loan)	25	(3)
2022–2024	Aktobe	63	(10)
2025	Astana	4	(0)
2025	→ Irtysh Pavlodar (loan)	14	(6)
2026–	Aktobe	8	(0)
2026–	→ Turan (loan)	15	(6)

International career^{‡}
2016	Kazakhstan U-17	1	(0)
2018	Kazakhstan U-19	10	(1)
2019–2021	Kazakhstan U-21	10	(0)
2023–	Kazakhstan	3	(0)
- * Club domestic league appearances and goals as of 2 November 2026 ‡ National team caps and goals as of 22 November 2023

Arman Serikuly Kenesov (Kazakh: Арман Серікұлы Кеңесов; born 4 September 2000) is a Kazakhstani football player who plays for Turan, on loan from Aktobe.

== Club career ==
He made his debut in the Kazakhstan Premier League for FC Irtysh Pavlodar on 29 July 2018 in a game against FC Shakhter Karagandy.

On 7 August 2020, FC SKA-Khabarovsk announced the signing of Kenesov on a three-year contract. On 18 January 2021, he was loaned to Kaisar until November 2021.

On 14 December 2021, he moved to Aktobe.
