= Leonel Strumia =

Argentine footballer (born 1992)

Personal information
- Date of birth: 29 September 1992 (age 34)
- Place of birth: Villa Nueva, Argentina
- Height: 1.68 m (5 ft 6 in)
- Position: Midfielder

Team information
- Current team: Liepāja
- Number: 5

Senior career*
Years	Team	Apps	(Gls)
–2015	Alumni		
2015–2020	Liepāja	118	(3)
2020–2022	RFS	46	(1)
2022–2023	Liepāja	29	(0)
2023–2025	Aktobe	45	(0)
2025	Limassol	10	(1)
2025–2026	Budućnost Podgorica	6	(0)
2026	Caspiy	12	(0)
2026–	Liepāja	14	(0)
- * Club domestic league appearances and goals as of 12 November 2026

Leonel Strumia (Latvian: Leonels Strumija Russian: Леонель Струмия; born 29 September 1992) is an Argentine footballer who plays as a midfielder for Latvian club Liepāja.

== Career ==
Before the 2015 season, Strumia signed for Latvian side Liepāja, helping them win the league and the 2017 Latvian Football Cup, their first major trophies. Before the 2020 season, he signed for RFS in Latvia, helping them win their first league title and the 2021 Latvian Football Cup.

Before the 2023 season, he signed for the Kazakhstani club Aktobe. On 4 March 2023, Strumia debuted for Aktobe during a 1–0 win over Zhetysu. On 5 January 2025, Aktobe announced that Strumia had left the club at the end of his contract.

On 20 January 2025, AEL Limassol announced the signing of Strumia on a contract until the end of the season.
