= 2022 FC Ordabasy season =

FC Ordabasy
2022 season
- Chairman: Kaysar Abdraymov
- Manager: Aleksandr Sednyov
- Stadium: Kazhymukan Munaitpasov Stadium
- Premier League: 4th
- Kazakhstan Cup: Winners
- Top goalscorer: League: Two Players (7); All: Elkhan Astanov (10)
- Highest home attendance: 3,700 vs Aktobe (18 June 2021)
- Lowest home attendance: 0 vs Akzhayik (5 April 2021)
- Average home league attendance: 1,044 (16 October 2021)
Home colours	Away colours

The 2022 FC Ordabasy season was the 20th successive season that Ordabasy played in the Kazakhstan Premier League, the highest tier of association football in Kazakhstan.

== Squad ==
As of match played 12 November 2022

No.	Name	Nationality	Position	Date of birth (age)	Signed from	Signed in	Contract ends	Apps.	Goals
Goalkeepers
1	Bekkhan Shayzada	(Kazakhstan)	GK	28 February 1998 (aged 24)	Youth Team	2016		65	0
51	Kazhymukan Tolepbergen	(Kazakhstan)	GK	21 April 2000 (aged 22)	Youth Team	2020		1	0
78	Timurbek Zakirov	(Kazakhstan)	GK	1 March 1996 (aged 26)	Unattached	2021		12	0
Defenders
2	Odil Abdumazhidov	(Uzbekistan)	DF	1 June 2001 (aged 21)	on loan from Metallurg Bekabad	2022	2022	29	2
4	Karam Sultanov	(Kazakhstan)	DF	15 April 1996 (aged 26)	Sumgayit	2021		37	6
6	Dominik Dinga	(Serbia)	DF	7 April 1998 (aged 24)	Ural Yekaterinburg	2022		8	0
13	Sagadat Tursynbay	(Kazakhstan)	DF	26 March 1999 (aged 23)	Youth Team	2018		59	1
Midfielders
7	Dzmitry Baradzin	(Belarus)	MF	19 July 1999 (aged 23)	Dinamo Minsk	2022		16	3
8	Samat Shamshi	(Kazakhstan)	MF	5 December 1996 (aged 25)	Kyran	2018		85	1
9	Oleksandr Batishchev	(Ukraine)	MF	14 September 1991 (aged 31)	Gomel	2022		28	1
10	Elkhan Astanov	(Kazakhstan)	MF	21 May 2000 (aged 22)	Youth Team	2019		78	12
11	Maksim Fedin	(Kazakhstan)	MF	8 June 1996 (aged 26)	Turan	2022		19	5
12	Victor Braga	(Brazil)	MF	18 April 2001 (aged 21)	Londrina	2022		31	0
14	Murojon Khalmatov	(Kazakhstan)	MF	20 July 2003 (aged 19)	Kairat Academy	2021		23	3
19	Zikrillo Sultaniyazov	(Kazakhstan)	MF	15 October 2003 (aged 19)	Youth Team	2021		10	0
23	Adilkhan Dobay	(Kazakhstan)	MF	2 June 2002 (aged 20)	Youth Team	2022		28	1
49	Shokhboz Umarov	(Uzbekistan)	MF	9 March 1999 (aged 23)	on loan from BATE Borisov	2022	2022	15	0
71	Igor Klyushkin	(Russia)	MF	29 January 2003 (aged 19)	Arsenal Tula	2022		2	0
98	Akmal Bakhtiyarov	(Kazakhstan)	MF	2 June 1998 (aged 24)	Olimp-Dolgoprudny	2022		17	1
99	Luiz Guedes	(Brazil)	MF	22 May 1999 (aged 23)	XV de Jaú	2022		31	5
Forwards
3	Vsevolod Sadovsky	(Belarus)	FW	4 October 1996 (aged 26)	Rukh Brest	2022		29	6
17	Serge Nyuiadzi	(Togo)	FW	17 September 1991 (aged 31)	Sūduva	2022		25	9
20	Batyrkhan Tazhibay	(Kazakhstan)	FW	7 August 2001 (aged 21)	Academy	2021		31	1
80	Nikita Shershnyov	(Russia)	FW	19 October 2001 (aged 21)	Mashuk-KMV Pyatigorsk	2022		16	0
91	Khamza Yakudi	(Kazakhstan)	FW	12 November 2003 (aged 19)	Unattached	2022		3	0
Players away on loan
5	Nurali Mamirbaev	(Kazakhstan)	DF	15 February 2000 (aged 22)	Kyran	2023		1	0
7	Asludin Khadzhiev	(Kazakhstan)	MF	24 October 2000 (age 25)	Youth Team	2019		36	1
11	Maksim Vaganov	(Kazakhstan)	MF	8 August 2000 (age 25)	Makhtaaral	2021		19	2
Players that left during the season
22	Sékou Doumbia	(Ivory Coast)	MF	11 February 1994 (aged 28)	Hapoel Hadera	2023		10	0
33	Yevhen Chahovets	(Ukraine)	DF	24 March 1998 (aged 24)	Rukh Brest	2023		5	0

== Transfers ==
=== In ===
Date	Position	Nationality	Name	From	Fee	Ref.
1 January 2022	FW	(Kazakhstan)	Nurali Mamirbaev	Kyran	Undisclosed	
4 March 2022	MF	(Ukraine)	Oleksandr Batyshchev	Gomel	Undisclosed	
5 March 2022	MF	(Brazil)	Victor Braga	Londrina	Undisclosed	
5 March 2022	MF	(Brazil)	Luiz Guedes	XV de Jaú	Undisclosed	
5 March 2022	FW	(Togo)	Serge Nyuiadzi	Sūduva	Undisclosed	
16 March 2022	FW	(Belarus)	Vsevolod Sadovsky	Rukh Brest	Undisclosed	
31 March 2022	DF	(Ukraine)	Yevhen Chahovets	Rukh Brest	Undisclosed	
9 April 2022	MF	(Ivory Coast)	Sékou Doumbia	Hapoel Hadera	Undisclosed	
17 April 2022	FW	(Russia)	Nikita Shershnyov	Mashuk-KMV Pyatigorsk	Undisclosed	
25 April 2022	FW	(Kazakhstan)	Khamza Yakudi	Unattached	Free	
15 July 2022	MF	(Kazakhstan)	Akmal Bakhtiyarov	Olimp-Dolgoprudny	Undisclosed	
15 July 2022	MF	(Kazakhstan)	Maksim Fedin	Turan	Undisclosed	
16 July 2022	DF	(Serbia)	Dominik Dinga	Ural Yekaterinburg	Undisclosed	
29 July 2022	MF	(Russia)	Igor Klyushkin	Arsenal Tula	Undisclosed	
31 July 2022	MF	(Belarus)	Dzmitry Baradzin	Dinamo Minsk	Undisclosed	

=== Loans in ===
Date from	Position	Nationality	Name	From	Date to	Ref.
6 March 2022	DF	(Uzbekistan)	Odil Abdumazhidov	Metallurg Bekabad	End of season	
15 July 2022	MF	(Uzbekistan)	Shokhboz Umarov	BATE Borisov	End of season	

=== Out ===
Date	Position	Nationality	Name	To	Fee	Ref.
21 July 2022	MF	(Ivory Coast)	Sékou Doumbia	Maktaaral	Undisclosed	

=== Loans out ===
Date from	Position	Nationality	Name	To	Date to	Ref.
9 July 2022	MF	(Kazakhstan)	Maksim Vaganov	Caspiy	End of season	
22 July 2022	DF	(Kazakhstan)	Nurali Mamirbaev	Academy Ontustik	End of season	
25 July 2022	MF	(Kazakhstan)	Asludin Khadzhiev	Academy Ontustik	End of season	

=== Released ===
Date	Position	Nationality	Name	Joined	Date	Ref.
16 July 2022	DF	(Ukraine)	Yevhen Chahovets	Riteriai		

== Competitions ==
=== Overview ===
Competition	First match	Last match	Starting round	Final position	Record							
Competition	First match	Last match	Starting round	Final position	Pld	W	D	L	GF	GA	GD	Win %
Premier League	5 March 2022	6 November 2022	Matchday 1	4th	26	11	5	10	36	39	−3	42.31
Kazakhstan Cup	9 July 2022	12 November 2022	Group stage	Winners	9	5	1	3	18	15	+3	55.56
Total					35	16	6	13	54	54	+0	45.71

Last updated: 12 November 2022
Source: Competitions

=== Premier League ===
==== Results summary ====
Overall								Home						Away					
Pld	W	D	L	GF	GA	GD	Pts	W	D	L	GF	GA	GD	W	D	L	GF	GA	GD
26	11	5	10	36	39	−3	38	9	2	2	28	13	+15	2	3	8	8	26	−18

Last updated: 6 November 2022.
Source: See Results

==== Results by round ====
Round	1	2	3	4	5	6	7	8	9	10	11	12	13	14	15	16	17	18	19	20	21	22	23	24	25	26
Ground	H	A	H	A	H	A	H	H	A	H	A	H	A	H	H	A	A	H	A	A	H	A	H	A	H	A
Result	D	L	W	L	W	D	W	W	L	L	L	W	W	W	W	L	L	L	L	W	W	L	W	D	D	D
Position	5	10	6	8	6	6	5	2	5	7	8	8	9	7	4	3	5	6	7	6	5	5	5	5	5	5

Source: See Results
A = Away; H = Home; W = Win; D = Draw; L = Loss

==== Results ====
5 March 2022 1	Ordabasy	1–1	Maktaaral	Shymkent
14:00 (UTC+6)	Nyuiadzi 38'	Report	Sebaihi 18'; Amirseitov (yellow card) 24'; Chikida (yellow card) 60'	Stadium: Kazhymukan Munaitpasov Stadium; Attendance: 1,000; Referee: Igor Chesnokov

10 March 2022 2	Taraz	1–0	Ordabasy	Taraz
15:00 (UTC+6)	Zhumabek 20'; Baytana (yellow card) 47'; Elias (yellow card) 80'	Report		Stadium: Central Stadium; Attendance: 3,000; Referee: Sergey Nozhenko

17 March 2022 3	Ordabasy	2–0	Akzhayik	Shymkent
17:00 (UTC+6)	Sultanov (yellow card) 9'; Braga (yellow card) 36'; Guedes 53' (yellow card) 72'; Vaganov 62' (red card) 90+3'; Abdumazhidov (yellow card) 66'	Report	Antipov (yellow card) 7' (yellow-red card) 29'	Stadium: Kazhymukan Munaitpasov Stadium; Attendance: 1,000; Referee: Artem Kuchin

3 April 2022 4	Caspiy	2–1	Ordabasy	Aktau
15:00 (UTC+6)	Sultanov 7' (o.g.); Teles 35'; Cuckić (yellow card) 70'	Report	Sadovsky 9'; Shamshi (yellow card) 36'; Tursynbay (yellow card) 57'	Stadium: Zhastar Stadium; Attendance: 3,200; Referee: Aidyn Tasybaev

9 April 2022 5	Ordabasy	3–1	Tobol	Shymkent
17:00 (UTC+6)	Astanov 22' (pen.); Nyuiadzi 44', 85'; Dobay (yellow card) 54'	Report	Marochkin (red card) 21'; Sergeyev 41'; Kairov (yellow card) 65'; Tagybergen (yellow card) 79'; Jovančić (yellow card) 86'; Zharynbetov (yellow card) 87'; Zhaksylykov (yellow card) 89'	Stadium: Kazhymukan Munaitpasov Stadium; Attendance: Bagdat Abdullaev; Referee: 3,500

16 April 2022 6	Turan	0–0	Ordabasy	Turkistan
19:00 (UTC+6)	Kleshchenko (yellow card) 18'; Nurgaliyev (yellow card) 49'; Aliyar (yellow card) 51'	Report	Tursynbay (yellow card) 11'; Fedin (yellow card) 13' (yellow-red card) 70'; Abdumazhidov (yellow card) 78'; Chahovets (yellow card) 90+1'	Stadium: Turkistan Arena; Attendance: 1,500; Referee: Alexander Gauzer

23 April 2022 7	Ordabasy	3–1	Kyzylzhar	Shymkent
17:00 (UTC+6)	Nyuiadzi 12', 90'; Astanov (yellow card) 38'; Sultanov 90+3'	Report	Murachyov (yellow card) 33'; Bushman 42'; Koné (yellow card) 55'	Stadium: Kazhymukan Munaitpasov Stadium; Attendance: 5,000; Referee: Bulat Sariev

26 April 2022 8	Ordabasy	2–1	Kairat	Shymkent
18:00 (UTC+6)	Dobay (yellow card) 5'; Astanov 11' (pen.) (yellow card) 67'; Vaganov (yellow card) 45+1'; Nyuiadzi 52'; Sadovsky (yellow card) 86'	Report	Tkachenko (yellow card) 10'; Shushenachev 31'; Ustimenko (yellow card) 45'; Alves (penalty missed) 76'	Stadium: Kazhymukan Munaitpasov Stadium; Attendance: 6,500; Referee: Saken Bayimbet

1 May 2022 9	Atyrau	2–1	Ordabasy	Atyrau
18:00 (UTC+6)	Pletnyov (yellow card) 9'; Tarasov 29'; Petrović (yellow card) 45' (yellow-red card) 90+2'; Filipović 53'; Ayrapetyan (yellow card) 89'	Report	Vaganov (yellow card) 13'; Astanov 45+5' (pen.)	Stadium: Munaishy Stadium; Attendance: 3,900; Referee: Sayat Karabaev

7 May 2022 10	Ordabasy	1–2	Astana	Shymkent
16:00 (UTC+6)	Sadovsky (yellow card) 3'; Nyuiadzi 44' (yellow card) 45+4'	Report	Eugénio 16'; Sagnayev (yellow card) 90+2'; Basmanov 90+5'	Stadium: Kazhymukan Munaitpasov Stadium; Attendance: 9,500; Referee: Alexander Zatula

14 May 2022 11	Shakhter Karagandy	1–0	Ordabasy	Karaganda
16:00 (UTC+6)	Murtazayev 50'; Bukorac (yellow card) 53'	Report	Vaganov (yellow card) 56'; Sultanov (yellow card) 90+2'	Stadium: Shakhter Stadium; Attendance: 3,000; Referee: Bulat Sariev

29 June 2022 12	Ordabasy	3–0	Aksu	Shymkent
20:00 (UTC+6)	Sultanov 8'; Sadovsky 38'; Batishchev (yellow card) 45+1'; Astanov 86'	Report	Suyumbayev (yellow card) 59'	Stadium: Kazhymukan Munaitpasov Stadium; Attendance: 0 Referee: Elvira Nurmustafina

21 August 2022 13	Aktobe	3–1	Ordabasy	Aktobe
21:00 (UTC+6)	China 1', 27'; Ghinaitis (yellow card) 32'; Vidémont 90+4'; Yerlanov (yellow card) 60'	Report	Astanov 12'; Umarov (yellow card) 35'	Stadium: Central Stadium; Attendance: 13,400; Referee: Rustam Omarov

19 June 2022 14	Ordabasy	3–2	Taraz	Shymkent
18:00 (UTC+6)	Astanov 8' (pen.); Sadovsky 15'; Gamakov 19' (o.g.); Shayzada (yellow card) 58'	Report	Gadrani (yellow card) 7'; Dairov (yellow card) 23'; Suley (penalty missed) 45'; Kozhamberdy 45+4' (pen.); Zhumabek 58'	Stadium: Kazhymukan Munaitpasov Stadium; Attendance: 3,000; Referee: Alexander Hauser

25 June 2022 15	Akzhayik	0–1	Ordabasy	Oral
19:00 (UTC+6)		Report	Tursynbay (yellow card) 66'; Abdumazhidov (yellow card) 74' (goal) 77'	Stadium: Petr Atoyan Stadium; Attendance: 700; Referee: Bagdat Abdullaev

4 July 2022 16	Ordabasy	4–1	Caspiy	Shymkent
20:00 (UTC+6)	Sadovsky 19'; Astanov 31'; Khalmatov 80', 87'	Report	Teles 77' (pen.)	Stadium: Kazhymukan Munaitpasov Stadium; Attendance: 8,500; Referee: Artem Kuchin

27 August 2022 17	Tobol	4–0	Ordabasy	Kostanay
21:00 (UTC+6)	Kairov (yellow card) 4'; Tošić 16'; Vukadinović 33'; Muzhikov 69'; Zhaksylykov 73'; Tomašević (yellow card) 84'	Report	Abdumazhidov (yellow card) 13'	Stadium: Central Stadium; Attendance: 2,500; Referee: Timur Kumashev

4 September 2022 18	Ordabasy	1–2	Turan	Shymkent
20:00 (UTC+6)	Sultanov (yellow card) 43' (goal) 58'	Report	Kabylan 34'; Yevdokimov (red card) 47'; Kerimzhanov 58'; Bashilov (yellow card) 77'; Tokotayev (yellow card) 90+5'	Stadium: Kazhymukan Munaitpasov Stadium; Attendance: 8,000; Referee: Bagdat Abdullaev

11 September 2022 19	Kyzylzhar	4–0	Ordabasy	Petropavl
16:00 (UTC+6)	Chikanchi 11'; Murachyov (yellow card) 62'; Koné 66' (yellow card) 85'; Karshakevich 74'; Lobjanidze 90+2'	Report	Guedes (yellow card) 61'; Shamshi (yellow card) 61'; Khalmatov (yellow card) 82'	Stadium: Karasai Stadium; Attendance: 3,500; Referee: Alexander Zatula

15 September 2022 20	Kairat	1–2	Ordabasy	Almaty
19:00 (UTC+6)	Paulo 45'	Report	Fedin 8'; Sultanov (yellow card) 29'; Bakhtiyarov 87'; Baradzin (yellow card) 90+1'	Stadium: Central Stadium; Attendance: 5,000; Referee: Grigory Moskovchenko

1 October 2022 21	Ordabasy	2–0	Atyrau	Shymkent
18:00 (UTC+6)	Dobay (yellow card) 36' (goal) 37'; Batishchev (yellow card) 87'; Sadovsky (yellow card) 90+1'; Abdumazhidov 90+5'	Report	Filipović (penalty missed) 36'; Tarasov (yellow card) 40'; Antanavičius (yellow card) 60'; Zavezyon (yellow card) 63'; Bissi (yellow card) 73'	Stadium: Kazhymukan Munaitpasov Stadium; Attendance: 7,000; Referee: Sergey Nozhenko

9 October 2022 22	Astana	6–0	Ordabasy	Astana
18:00 (UTC+6)	Tomasov 47'; Kuat (yellow card) 54'; Aymbetov 57', 59', 62'; Manzorro (yellow card) 67'; Eugénio 90+3'; Beysebekov 90+4'	Report	Baradzin (yellow card) 63'	Stadium: Astana Arena; Attendance: 3,200; Referee: Artem Kuchin

14 October 2022 23	Ordabasy	1–0	Shakhter Karagandy	Shymkent
19:00 (UTC+6)	Shamshi (yellow card) 48'; Fedin 71'	Report	Cañas (yellow card) 25'; Poznyak (yellow card) 90+2'; Tutkyshev (yellow card) 90+4'	Stadium: Kazhymukan Munaitpasov Stadium; Attendance: 12,000; Referee: Alexander Gauzer

24 October 2022 24	Aksu	2–2	Ordabasy	Turkistan
17:00 (UTC+6)	Silva 10' (yellow card) 35'; Zličić (yellow card) 18'; Suyumbayev 23'; Obilor (yellow card) 45+1'; Turlybek (yellow card) 57'; Smailov (yellow card) 88'	Report	Baradzin 20'; Fedin (yellow card) 35'; Batyshchev 42'; Tursynbay (yellow card) 44'	Stadium: Central Stadium; Attendance: 3,200; Referee: Anton Kuchma

29 October 2022 25	Ordabasy	2–2	Aktobe	Shymkent
19:00 (UTC+6)	Baradzin 53' (pen.), 61' (pen.) (yellow card) 75'	Report	Gohou 16', 39' (yellow card) 57'; Kenesov (yellow card) 49'	Stadium: Kazhymukan Munaitpasov Stadium; Attendance: 15,000; Referee: Daniyar Sakhi

6 November 2022 26	Maktaaral	0–0	Ordabasy	Turkistan
17:00 (UTC+6)	Potapov (yellow card) 26'; Abdurakhmanov (yellow card) 52'; Djaha (red card) 81'; Koné (yellow card) 90+2'	Report	Abdumazhidov (yellow card) 90'	Stadium: Turkestan Arena; Attendance: 2,500; Referee: Bulat Sariev

==== League table ====
Pos	Team	Pld	W	D	L	GF	GA	GD	Pts	Qualification or relegation
3	Tobol	26	14	5	7	46	33	+13	47	Qualification for the Europa Conference League first qualifying round
4	Kairat	26	12	6	8	34	36	−2	42	
5	Ordabasy (Note: Qualified as cup winners)	26	11	5	10	36	39	−3	38	Qualification for the Europa Conference League second qualifying round
6	Aksu	26	11	3	12	32	37	−5	36	
7	Shakhter Karagandy	26	9	5	12	34	35	−1	32	

Source: UEFA, Soccerway
Rules for classification: 1) Points; 2) Goal difference; 3) Matches won; 4) Goals scored; 5) Away goals scored; 6) Head-to-head points; 7) Head-to-head matches won; 8) Head-to-head goal difference; 9) Head-to-head goals scored; 10) Head-to-head away goals scored; 11) Draw.

=== Kazakhstan Cup ===
==== Group stage ====
Pos	Team	Pld	W	D	L	GF	GA	GD	Pts	Qualification
1	Kairat (A)	6	5	1	0	15	6	+9	16	Advanced to Quarterfinals
2	Ordabasy (A)	6	3	0	3	9	8	+1	9	Advanced to Quarterfinals
3	Atyrau	6	2	1	3	6	11	−5	7	
4	Aksu	6	0	2	4	3	8	−5	2	

Updated to match(es) played on 13 August 2022. Source: PFLK
(A) Advance to a further round

9 July 2022 1	Kairat	2 – 0	Ordabasy	Almaty
19:00 (UTC+6)	Paulo 18'; Ulshin (yellow card) 20'; Sadybekov 48'; Keiler (yellow card) 67'; Kanté (yellow card) 90+6'	Report		Stadium: Central Stadium; Attendance: 3,648; Referee: Sayat Karabaev

17 July 2022 2	Ordabasy	2 – 0	Aksu	Shymkent
20:00 (UTC+6)	Fedin 10'; Sultanov 17'	Report	Krasotin (yellow card) 17'; Tungyshbaev (red card) 37'	Stadium: Kazhymukan Munaitpasov Stadium; Attendance: 6,500; Referee: Bolat Karlibaev

22 July 2022 3	Atyrau	1 – 4	Ordabasy	Atyrau
19:00 (UTC+6)	Bissi (yellow card) 7'; Antanavičius (yellow card) 33'; Takulov (yellow card) 85'; Sokolenko (yellow card) 90+2'; Filipović 90+6'	Report	Guedes 43'; Astanov 45' (yellow card) 58'; Batishchev (yellow card) 45+1'; Abdumazhidov (yellow card) 57'; Shamshi (yellow card) 62'; Fedin 73'; Khalmatov 89'	Stadium: Munaishy Stadium; Attendance: 2,500; Referee: Georgiy Chekhovskiy

29 July 2022 4	Ordabasy	1 – 2	Atyrau	Shymkent
19:00 (UTC+6)	Astanov 19' (pen.); Sadovsky (yellow card) 24'; Dinga (yellow card) 90+1'; Abdumazhidov (yellow card) 90+5'; Fedin (yellow card)	Report	Filipović 11' (yellow card) 44'; Adambaev (yellow card) 18'; Petrović 71'; Ibragimov (yellow card) 72'; Karavaev (yellow card) 83'	Stadium: Kazhymukan Munaitpasov Stadium; Attendance: 4,700; Referee: Daniyar Sakhi

7 August 2022 5	Ordabasy	1 – 3	Kairat	Shymkent
21:00 (UTC+6)	Dinga (yellow card) 16'; Nyuiadzi 62'	Report	Paulo 3'; Usenov (yellow card) 43'; Shushenachev 71'; Alykulov 86' (pen.)	Stadium: Kazhymukan Munaitpasov Stadium; Attendance: 9,500; Referee: Anton Kuchma

13 August 2022 6	Aksu	0 – 1	Ordabasy	Pavlodar
21:00 (UTC+6)	Silva (yellow card) 5'; Abdumazhidov (yellow card) 48'; Sultanov (yellow card) 78'	Report	Guedes 24'; Dobay (yellow card) 33'; Suyumbayev (yellow card) 90+5'; Zhaksybaev (yellow card) 90+6'	Stadium: Central Stadium; Attendance: 2,000; Referee: Saken Baiymbet

==== Knockout stages ====
31 August 2022 Quarterfinal	Kaisar	1 – 1 (a.e.t.) (1 – 4 p)	Ordabasy	Kyzylorda
21:00 (UTC+6)	Kurmanbekuly (yellow card) 10'; Altynbekov (yellow card) 33'; Seitov 75'; Tolegenov (yellow card) 87'	Report	Astanov (yellow card) 7'; Sadovsky 56'; Abdumazhidov (yellow card) 106'	Stadium: Gani Muratbayev Stadium; Attendance: 6,000; Referee: Grigory Moskovchenko
	Penalties
	Altynbekov (penalty scored); Sakhalbaev (penalty missed); Tolegenov (penalty missed)		(penalty scored) Baradzin; (penalty scored) Bakhtiyarov; (penalty scored) Batyshchev; (penalty scored) Shamshi

19 October 2022 Semifinal	Astana	2–3	Ordabasy	Astana
19:00 (UTC+6)	Sagnayev (yellow card) 2'; Prokopenko 32' (pen.), 39'; Kalmakhambet (yellow card) 48'	Report	Kanatkali 22' (o.g.); Shayzada (yellow card) 33'; Tursynbay (yellow card) 43'; Guedes 65'; Nyuiadzi 90+8'	Stadium: Astana Arena; Attendance: 2,200; Referee: Saken Bayimbet

12 November 2022 Final	Akzhayik	4 – 5 (a.e.t.)	Ordabasy	Astana
15:00 (UTC+6)	Badoyan 7'; Tabatadze 11', 68'; Kalenchuk (yellow card) 20'; Sabino (yellow card) 54'; Bilali (yellow card) 64'; Kovalenko 74'; Pryndeta (yellow card) 117'; Omarov (yellow card) 118'	Report	Shamshi 26'; Sadovsky 51'; Tursynbay (yellow card) 61'; Fedin 76'; Guedes 90+7'; Batyshchev (yellow card) 94'; Astanov 119' (pen.)	Stadium: Astana Arena; Attendance: 3,620; Referee: Artem Kuchin

== Squad statistics ==
As of match played 12 November 2022

=== Appearances and goals ===
No.	Pos	Nat	Player	Total		Premier League		Kazakhstan Cup	
No.	Pos	Nat	Player	Apps	Goals	Apps	Goals	Apps	Goals
1	GK	(Kazakhstan) KAZ	Bekkhan Shayzada	25	0	20	0	5	0
2	DF	(Uzbekistan) UZB	Odil Abdumazhidov	29	2	21+2	2	6	0
3	FW	(Belarus) BLR	Vsevolod Sadovsky	29	6	13+7	4	6+3	2
4	DF	(Kazakhstan) KAZ	Karam Sultanov	30	4	22	3	8	1
6	DF	(Serbia) SRB	Dominik Dinga	8	0	5	0	2+1	0
7	MF	(Belarus) BLR	Dzmitry Baradzin	16	3	9+2	3	4+1	0
8	MF	(Kazakhstan) KAZ	Samat Shamshi	28	1	16+4	0	6+2	1
9	MF	(Ukraine) UKR	Oleksandr Batishchev	28	1	19	1	9	0
10	MF	(Kazakhstan) KAZ	Elkhan Astanov	33	10	24+1	7	7+1	3
11	MF	(Kazakhstan) KAZ	Maksim Fedin	19	5	9+2	2	8	3
12	MF	(Brazil) BRA	Victor Braga	31	0	22+2	0	5+2	0
13	DF	(Kazakhstan) KAZ	Sagadat Tursynbay	32	0	24	0	8	0
14	MF	(Kazakhstan) KAZ	Murojon Khalmatov	18	3	0+15	2	1+2	1
17	FW	(Togo) TOG	Serge Nyuiadzi	25	9	18+3	7	1+3	2
19	MF	(Kazakhstan) KAZ	Zikrillo Sultaniyazov	6	0	0+3	0	0+3	0
20	FW	(Kazakhstan) KAZ	Batyrkhan Tazhibay	21	0	0+16	0	0+5	0
23	MF	(Kazakhstan) KAZ	Adilkhan Dobay	28	1	6+15	1	4+3	0
49	MF	(Uzbekistan) UZB	Shokhboz Umarov	15	0	5+4	0	2+4	0
51	GK	(Kazakhstan) KAZ	Kazhymukan Tolepbergen	1	0	0+1	0	0	0
71	MF	(Russia) RUS	Igor Klyushkin	2	0	1+1	0	0	0
78	GK	(Kazakhstan) KAZ	Timurbek Zakirov	11	0	6+1	0	4	0
80	FW	(Russia) RUS	Nikita Shershnyov	16	0	8+5	0	2+1	0
91	FW	(Kazakhstan) KAZ	Khamza Yakudi	3	0	0+1	0	0+2	0
98	MF	(Kazakhstan) KAZ	Akmal Bakhtiyarov	17	1	7+2	1	8	0
99	MF	(Brazil) BRA	Luiz Guedes	31	5	8+16	1	3+4	4
Players away from Ordabasy on loan:
5	DF	(Kazakhstan) KAZ	Nurali Mamirbaev	1	0	0+1	0	0	0
7	MF	(Kazakhstan) KAZ	Asludin Khadzhiev	7	0	3+3	0	0+1	0
11	MF	(Kazakhstan) KAZ	Maksim Vaganov	11	1	6+5	1	0	0
Players who left Ordabasy during the season:
22	MF	(Ivory Coast) CIV	Sékou Doumbia	10	0	9	0	0+1	0
33	DF	(Ukraine) UKR	Yevhen Chahovets	5	0	5	0	0	0

=== Goal scorers ===
Place	Position	Nation	Number	Name	Premier League	Kazakhstan Cup	Total
1	MF	(Kazakhstan)	10	Elkhan Astanov	7	3	10
2	FW	(Togo)	17	Serge Nyuiadzi	7	2	9
3	FW	(Belarus)	3	Vsevolod Sadovsky	4	2	6
4	DF	(Kazakhstan)	4	Karam Sultanov	4	1	5
4	MF	(Kazakhstan)	11	Maksim Fedin	2	3	5
4	MF	(Brazil)	99	Luiz Guedes	1	4	5
7	MF	(Belarus)	7	Dzmitry Baradzin	3	0	3
7	MF	(Kazakhstan)	14	Murojon Khalmatov	2	1	3
10	DF	(Uzbekistan)	2	Odil Abdumajidov	2	0	2
11	MF	(Kazakhstan)	98	Akmal Bakhtiyarov	1	0	1
11	MF	(Ukraine)	9	Oleksandr Batishchev	1	0	1
11	MF	(Kazakhstan)	23	Adilkhan Dobay	1	0	1
11	MF	(Kazakhstan)	11	Maksim Vaganov	1	0	1
11	MF	(Kazakhstan)	8	Samat Shamshi	0	1	1
11				Own goal	0	1	1
				TOTALS	36	18	54

=== Clean sheets ===
Place	Position	Nation	Number	Name	Premier League	Kazakhstan Cup	Total
1	GK	(Kazakhstan)	1	Bekkhan Shayzada	4	2	6
2	GK	(Kazakhstan)	78	Timurbek Zakirov	3	0	3
				TOTALS	7	2	9

=== Disciplinary record ===
Number	Nation	Position	Name	Premier League		Kazakhstan Cup		Total	
Number	Nation	Position	Name	Booked	Sent off (straight red)	Booked	Sent off (straight red)	Booked	Sent off (straight red)
1	(Kazakhstan)	GK	Bekkhan Shayzada	1	0	1	0	2	0
2	(Uzbekistan)	DF	Odil Abdumajidov	5	0	4	0	9	0
3	(Belarus)	FW	Vsevolod Sadovsky	4	0	1	0	5	0
4	(Kazakhstan)	DF	Karam Sultanov	4	0	1	0	5	0
6	(Serbia)	DF	Dominik Dinga	0	0	2	0	2	0
7	(Belarus)	MF	Dzmitry Baradzin	2	0	0	0	2	0
8	(Kazakhstan)	DF	Samat Shamshi	3	0	1	0	4	0
9	(Ukraine)	MF	Oleksandr Batishchev	2	0	2	0	4	0
10	(Kazakhstan)	MF	Elkhan Astanov	2	0	2	0	4	0
11	(Kazakhstan)	MF	Maksim Fedin	1	0	0	0	1	0
12	(Brazil)	MF	Victor Braga	1	1	0	0	1	1
13	(Kazakhstan)	DF	Sagadat Tursynbay	4	0	2	0	6	0
14	(Kazakhstan)	MF	Murojon Khalmatov	1	0	0	0	1	0
17	(Togo)	FW	Serge Nyuiadzi	1	0	0	0	1	0
23	(Kazakhstan)	MF	Adilkhan Dobay	3	0	1	0	4	0
49	(Uzbekistan)	MF	Shokhboz Umarov	1	0	0	0	1	0
99	(Brazil)	MF	Luiz Guedes	2	0	0	0	2	0
Players away on loan:
11	(Kazakhstan)	MF	Maksim Vaganov	3	1	0	0	3	1
Players who left Ordabasy during the season:
33	(Ukraine)	DF	Yevhen Chahovets	1	1	0	0	1	1
			TOTALS	41	3	17	0	58	3
