= 2022 FC Astana season =

FC Astana
2022 season
- Chairman: Sayan Khamitzhanov
- Manager: Srđan Blagojević (until 13 September); Grigori Babayan (from 13 September)
- Stadium: Astana Arena
- Premier League: 1st
- Kazakhstan Cup: Semifinals vs Ordabasy
- Europa Conference League: Second Qualifying round vs Raków Częstochowa
- Top goalscorer: League: Pedro Eugénio (17); All: Pedro Eugénio (23)
- Highest home attendance: 12,500 vs Kairat (14 May 2022)
- Lowest home attendance: 0 vs Turan (1 May 2022)
- Average home league attendance: 3,119 (23 October 2022)
Home colours	Away colours

The 2022 FC Astana season was the fourteenth successive season that FC Astana will play in the Kazakhstan Premier League, the highest tier of association football in Kazakhstan. They finished as Champions of the Premier League, having finished second the previous season behind Tobol. Astana also reached the Semifinals of the Kazakhstan Cup where they were knocked out by Ordabasy, and the Second Qualifying round of the Europa Conference League where they were defeated by Raków Częstochowa.

== Season events ==
At the end of the previous season, Astana appointed Srđan Blagojević as their head coach.

On 14 January, Astana announced the signings of Marko Milošević from Caspiy and Artsyom Rakhmanaw from Rukh Brest, both on contracts until the end of the 2023 season, and the signing of Bryan from Atyrau on a contract until the end of 2022.

On 19 January, Astana announced the signing of Kamo Hovhannisyan from Kairat. The following day, 20 January, Astana announced the signing of Aslan Darabayev, who'd previously played for Caspiy.

On 27 January, Astana announced the signing of Danylo Beskorovainyi on loan from DAC 1904 for the season, with the option to make the move permanent.

On 16 February, Astana announced the signing of Jérémy Manzorro.

On 18 February, Astana announced the signing of Dzyanis Palyakow.

On 11 March, Shakhter Karagandy were awarded a 3-0 technical victory over Astana after Astana fielded seven Foreign Players on the pitch at the same time during their match on 5 March 2022.

On 25 March, Astana announced the signing of Rai Vloet from Heracles Almelo.

On 11 July, Astana announced the signing of Timur Dosmagambetov from Shakhter Karagandy. Four days later, 15 July, Astana announced the signing of Mikhail Gabyshev from Shakhter Karagandy.

On 25 July, Sagi Sovet joined Maktaaral on loan for the remember of the season.

On 10 August, Astana announced the signing of free agent Keelan Lebon, who'd last played for Beroe Stara Zagora.

On 6 September, Astana announced that Rai Vloet had been sold to Ural Yekaterinburg after they had exercised a release clause in Vloet contract.

On 13 September, Srđan Blagojević left Astana by mutual consent to become head coach of Debreceni, with Grigori Babayan returning to the club as their new head coach.

== Squad ==
As of match played 6 November 2022

No.	Name	Nationality	Position	Date of birth (age)	Signed from	Signed in	Contract ends	Apps.	Goals
Goalkeepers
31	Danil Podymksy	(Kazakhstan)	GK	13 May 1998 (aged 24)	Academy	2016		2	0
34	Marko Milošević	(Serbia)	GK	7 February 1991 (aged 31)	Caspiy	2022	2023	19	0
55	Aleksandr Zarutskiy	(Kazakhstan)	GK	26 August 1993 (aged 29)	Kaisar	2021	2023	32	0
Defenders
3	Artsyom Rakhmanaw	(Belarus)	DF	10 July 1990 (aged 32)	Rukh Brest	2022	2023	14	0
5	Mikhail Gabyshev	(Kazakhstan)	DF	2 January 1990 (aged 32)	Shakhter Karagandy	2022		11	0
6	Bryan	(Brazil)	DF	28 March 1992 (aged 30)	Atyrau	2022	2022	26	0
13	Kamo Hovhannisyan	(Armenia)	DF	5 October 1992 (aged 30)	Kairat	2022	2022	26	0
15	Abzal Beysebekov	(Kazakhstan)	DF	30 November 1992 (aged 29)	Vostok	2012	2023	359	15
23	Dzyanis Palyakow	(Belarus)	DF	17 April 1991 (aged 31)	Unattached	2022		24	1
32	Talgat Kusyapov	(Kazakhstan)	DF	14 February 1999 (aged 23)	Academy	2016		23	2
33	Danylo Beskorovaynyi	(Ukraine)	DF	7 February 1999 (aged 23)	loan from DAC 1904	2022	2022	28	0
52	Rakhat Maratov	(Kazakhstan)	DF	28 April 2001 (aged 21)	Academy	2021		3	0
Midfielders
7	Max Ebong	(Belarus)	MF	26 August 1999 (aged 23)	Shakhtyor Soligorsk	2020	2023	76	8
8	Islambek Kuat	(Kazakhstan)	MF	12 January 1993 (aged 29)	Khimki	2021	2024	70	4
10	Marin Tomasov	(Croatia)	MF	31 August 1987 (aged 35)	Rijeka	2018	2022	191	90
11	Aslan Darabayev	(Kazakhstan)	MF	21 January 1989 (aged 33)	Caspiy	2022		30	2
14	Jérémy Manzorro	(France)	MF	11 November 1991 (aged 30)	Unattached	2022		25	3
22	Sultan Sagnayev	(Kazakhstan)	MF	14 January 2000 (aged 22)	Academy	2016		50	2
27	Timur Dosmagambetov	(Kazakhstan)	MF	1 May 1989 (aged 33)	Shakhter Karagandy	2022		17	4
28	Yuriy Pertsukh	(Kazakhstan)	MF	13 May 1996 (aged 26)	Akzhayik	2018		71	6
77	Pedro Eugénio	(Portugal)	MF	26 June 1990 (aged 32)	Taraz	2021		44	24
Forwards
17	Abat Aymbetov	(Kazakhstan)	FW	7 August 1995 (aged 27)	Krylia Sovetov	2022		46	19
19	Keelan Lebon	(France)	FW	4 July 1997 (aged 25)	Unattached	2022		13	2
20	Vladislav Prokopenko	(Kazakhstan)	FW	1 July 2000 (aged 22)	Academy	2016		40	3
72	Stanislav Basmanov	(Kazakhstan)	FW	24 June 2001 (aged 21)	Academy	2020		42	4
Youth team
43	Sanzhar Shurakhanov	(Kazakhstan)	DF	6 December 2001 (aged 20)	Academy	2021		4	0
53	Andrey Berezutskiy	(Kazakhstan)	FW	30 January 2004 (aged 18)	Academy	2021		1	0
58	Azamat Nurzhanuly	(Kazakhstan)	MF	8 February 2001 (aged 21)	Academy	2021		5	0
63	Dias Kanatkali	(Kazakhstan)	DF	14 February 2001 (aged 21)	Academy	2021		4	0
65	Meyrambek Kalmyrza	(Kazakhstan)	MF	15 December 2001 (aged 20)	Academy	2020		7	0
66	Olzhas Adil	(Kazakhstan)	MF	1 April 2003 (aged 19)	Academy	2022		3	0
68	Makhmud Dunzurov	(Kazakhstan)	MF	22 March 2001 (aged 21)	Academy	2022		1	0
79	Salamat Zhumabekov	(Kazakhstan)	MF	25 January 2004 (aged 18)	Academy	2022		4	0
82	Aydos Kumarov	(Kazakhstan)	DF	27 February 2002 (aged 20)	Academy	2021		1	0
84	Alikhan Umbitaliev	(Kazakhstan)	MF	9 July 2001 (aged 21)	Academy	2022		1	0
85	Valikhan Tyulyupov	(Kazakhstan)	MF	10 February 2002 (aged 20)	Academy	2022		1	0
87	Zhasasyn Kalmakhambet	(Kazakhstan)	MF	21 February 2001 (aged 21)	Academy	2021		1	0
89	Bauyrzhan Akhaev	(Kazakhstan)	DF	26 September 2001 (aged 21)	Academy	2021		5	0
90	Ruslan Kirgetov	(Kazakhstan)	FW	7 July 2002 (aged 20)	Academy	2022		3	0
94	Yuri Akhanov	(Kazakhstan)	DF	31 July 2002 (aged 20)	Academy	2021		2	0
97	Adilkhan Sabyr	(Kazakhstan)	FW	11 September 2001 (aged 21)	Academy	2021		1	0
	Ruslan Pistol	(Kazakhstan)	DF	2 September 2002 (aged 20)	Academy	2021		1	0
Players away on loan
18	Sagi Sovet	(Kazakhstan)	DF	15 March 2000 (aged 22)	Academy	2016		22	0
87	Zhaslan Kairkenov	(Kazakhstan)	MF	27 March 2000 (aged 22)	Academy	2016		2	0
Left during the season
9	Rai Vloet	(Netherlands)	MF	8 May 1995 (aged 27)	Heracles Almelo	2022		19	7
21	Mohammed Kamara	(Liberia)	FW	31 October 1997 (aged 25)	loan from Hatayspor	2022		2	0
32	Rangelo Janga	(Curaçao)	FW	16 April 1992 (aged 30)	KAA Gent	2018		64	11
81	Ramazan Karimov	(Kazakhstan)	FW	5 July 1999 (aged 23)	Academy	2018		6	1

=== On loan ===
Note: Flags indicate national team as defined under FIFA eligibility rules; some limited exceptions apply. Players may hold more than one non-FIFA nationality.

No. / Pos. / Nation / Player; 18 / DF / KAZ / Sagi Sovet (at Maktaaral)	No. / Pos. / Nation / Player; 87 / MF / KAZ / Zhaslan Kairkenov (at Aksu)

== Transfers ==
=== In ===
Date	Position	Nationality	Name	From	Fee	Ref.
14 January 2022	GK	(Serbia)	Marko Milošević	Caspiy	Undisclosed	
14 January 2022	DF	(Belarus)	Artsyom Rakhmanaw	Rukh Brest	Undisclosed	
14 January 2022	DF	(Brazil)	Bryan	Atyrau	Undisclosed	
19 January 2022	DF	(Armenia)	Kamo Hovhannisyan	Kairat	Undisclosed	
20 January 2022	MF	(Kazakhstan)	Aslan Darabayev	Caspiy	Undisclosed	
16 February 2022	MF	(France)	Jérémy Manzorro	Unattached	Free	
18 February 2022	DF	(Belarus)	Dzyanis Palyakow	Unattached	Free	
25 March 2022	FW	(Netherlands)	Rai Vloet	Heracles Almelo	Undisclosed	
11 July 2022	MF	(Kazakhstan)	Timur Dosmagambetov	Shakhter Karagandy	Undisclosed	
15 July 2022	DF	(Kazakhstan)	Mikhail Gabyshev	Shakhter Karagandy	Undisclosed	
10 August 2022	FW	(France)	Keelan Lebon	Unattached	Free	

=== Loans in ===
Date from	Position	Nationality	Name	From	Date to	Ref.
27 January 2022	DF	(Ukraine)	Danylo Beskorovainyi	DAC 1904	11 December 2022	
25 February 2022	FW	(Liberia)	Mohammed Kamara	Hatayspor	30 June 2022	

=== Out ===
Date	Position	Nationality	Name	To	Fee	Ref.
31 January 2022	FW	(Montenegro)	Fatos Bećiraj	Dečić	Undisclosed	
8 April 2022	MF	(Kazakhstan)	Ramazan Karimov	Maktaaral	Undisclosed	
6 September 2022	MF	(Netherlands)	Rai Vloet	Ural Yekaterinburg	Undisclosed	

=== Loans out ===
Date from	Position	Nationality	Name	To	Date to	Ref.
7 July 2021	FW	(Curaçao)	Rangelo Janga	Apollon Limassol	30 June 2022	
8 February 2022	MF	(Kazakhstan)	Zhaslan Kairkenov	Aksu	End of season	
25 July 2022	DF	(Kazakhstan)	Sagi Sovet	Maktaaral	End of season	

=== Released ===
Date	Position	Nationality	Name	Joined	Date	Ref.
2 January 2022	DF	(Albania)	Eneo Bitri	Partizani Tirana		
2 January 2022	FW	(Bosnia and Herzegovina)	Semir Smajlagić	Nasaf	26 February 2022	
5 January 2022	GK	(Kazakhstan)	Dmytro Nepohodov	Tobol	27 January 2022	
5 January 2022	DF	(Spain)	Cadete	Melbourne Victory	22 July 2022	
17 January 2022	DF	(Montenegro)	Žarko Tomašević	Tobol	27 January 2022	
30 June 2022	FW	(Curaçao)	Rangelo Janga	Apollon Limassol	14 July 2022	
21 December 2022	DF	(Brazil)	Bryan	Aksu		
31 December 2022	GK	(Croatia)	Marko Milošević	Debreceni	3 March 2023	
31 December 2022	DF	(Kazakhstan)	Rakhat Maratov			
31 December 2022	DF	(Kazakhstan)	Ruslan Pistol			
31 December 2022	MF	(Kazakhstan)	Zhasasyn Kalmakhambet			
31 December 2022	MF	(Kazakhstan)	Azamat Nurzhanuly	Altai		
31 December 2022	FW	(Kazakhstan)	Adilkhan Sabyr			

=== Trial ===
Date from	Position	Nationality	Name	Last club	Date end	Ref.
January 2022	DF	(Kazakhstan)	Yeldos Akhmetov	Taraz		
January 2022	FW	(Kazakhstan)	Abat Aymbetov	Krylia Sovetov		

== Friendlies ==
24 January 2022	Astana (Kazakhstan)	v	(Serbia) TSC Bačka Topola	Antalya, Turkey
(UTC+6)
Note: Match cancelled on 24 January.

31 January 2022	Astana (Kazakhstan)	0–1	(Bulgaria) Arda Kardzhali	Antalya, Turkey
14:00 (UTC+6)		Report	Kokonov (penalty missed) 68' 71'

9 February 2022	Astana (Kazakhstan)	1–2	(Russia) Krylia Sovetov	Belek, Turkey
14:00 (UTC+6)	Aymbetov 46'	Report	Lipovoy 43'; Gorshkov 64'

13 February 2022	Astana (Kazakhstan)	v	(Ukraine) Inhulets Petrove	Belek, Turkey
(UTC+6)
Note: Match cancelled on 12 February.

14 February 2022	Astana (Kazakhstan)	3–2	(Ukraine) Mariupol	Belek, Turkey
22:30 (UTC+6)	Eugénio 2'; Hovhannisyan 57'; Basmanov 71'	Report	Kulakov 39' (pen.); Khromey 50'

18 February 2022	Astana (Kazakhstan)	0–3	(Ukraine) Shakhtar Donetsk	Belek, Turkey
20:00 (UTC+6)		Report	Mudryk 2'; Tetê 89'; Neres 90+1'

21 February 2022	Astana (Kazakhstan)	1–2	(Latvia) Auda	Belek, Turkey
(UTC+6)	Prokopenko	Report	Goal

22 February 2022	Astana (Kazakhstan)	0–1	(Latvia) Liepāja	Belek, Turkey
20:00 (UTC+6)		Report

== Competitions ==
=== Overview ===
Competition	First match	Last match	Starting round	Final position	Record							
Competition	First match	Last match	Starting round	Final position	Pld	W	D	L	GF	GA	GD	Win %
Premier League	5 March 2022	6 November 2022	Matchday 1	Winners	26	16	5	5	65	24	+41	61.54
Kazakhstan Cup	8 July 2022	19 October 2022	Group stage	Semifinal	8	4	3	1	20	10	+10	50.00
Europa Conference League	21 July 2022	28 July 2022	Second Qualifying Round	Second Qualifying Round	2	0	0	2	0	6	−6	0.00
Total					36	20	8	8	85	40	+45	55.56

Last updated: 6 November 2022
Source: Competitions

=== Premier League ===
==== Results summary ====
Overall								Home						Away					
Pld	W	D	L	GF	GA	GD	Pts	W	D	L	GF	GA	GD	W	D	L	GF	GA	GD
26	16	5	5	65	24	+41	53	10	1	2	42	10	+32	6	4	3	23	14	+9

Last updated: 6 November 2022.
Source: See Results

==== Results by round ====
Round	1	2	3	4	5	6	7	8	9	10	11	12	13	14	15	16	17	18	19	20	21	22	23	24	25	26
Ground	H	A	H	A	H	A	H	A	H	A	H	A	H	A	H	H	A	H	A	H	A	H	A	H	A	A
Result	L (Note: Astana were awarded a technical defeat on 11 March.)	L	W	W	W	L	W	D	D	W	W	D	W	L	W	W	D	W	W	L	D	W	W	W	W	W
Position	7	14	10	6	5	5	2	4	3	3	2	2	1	2	2	2	2	2	2	2	2	2	2	2	1	1

Source: See Results
A = Away; H = Home; W = Win; D = Draw; L = Loss

==== Results ====
5 March 2022 1	Astana	0–3	Shakhter Karagandy	Nur-Sultan
15:00 (UTC+6)	Darabayev (yellow card) 43'; Kuat (yellow card) 54'; Beysebekov (yellow card) 67'	Report	Gabyshev (yellow card) 26'; Dosmagambetov (yellow card) 76'; Nazarenko (yellow card) 90'; Lamanje (red card) 90+5'	Stadium: Astana Arena; Attendance: 2,000; Referee: Alexander Zatula
Note: Match awarded to Shakhter Karagandy on 11 March.

10 March 2022 2	Aksu	1–0	Astana	Pavlodar
17:00 (UTC+6)	U.Zhaksybaev (yellow card) 13'; Abiken (yellow card) 65'; M.Turlybek 81'	Report	Milošević (yellow card) 13'	Stadium: Central Stadium; Attendance: 4,000; Referee: Elvira Nurmustafina

17 March 2022 3	Astana	1–0	Aktobe	Nur-Sultan
15:00 (UTC+6)	Kuat (yellow card) 3'; Darabayev 9'; Beskorovaynyi (yellow card) 40'	Report	Y.Kybyrai (yellow card) 66'; A.Tanzharikov (yellow card) 89'; Kambolov (yellow card) 90+1'	Stadium: Astana Arena; Attendance: 3,000; Referee: Sakhi Daniyar

3 April 2022 4	Maktaaral	0–3	Astana	Turkistan
18:00 (UTC+6)	R.Dzhumatov (yellow card) 28'; A.Tuzakbaev (yellow card) 76'	Report	Eugénio 8', 38'; Palyakow (yellow card) 37'; Tomasov 57' (pen.)	Stadium: Turkistan Arena; Attendance: 2,000; Referee: Sergey Gorohovodatsky

10 April 2022 5	Astana	2–1	Taraz	Nur-Sultan
19:00 (UTC+6)	Ebong 22'; Hovhannisyan (yellow card) 44'; N.Dairov 67' (o.g.)	Report	Gadrani 25'; Gamakov (yellow card) 39'	Stadium: Astana Arena; Attendance: 2,000; Referee: Igor Chesnokov

16 April 2022 6	Akzhayik	1–0	Astana	Oral
15:00 (UTC+6)	Kalenchuk 27'	Report	Ebong (yellow card) 57'; Darabayev (yellow card) 59'; Tomasov (yellow card) 72'	Stadium: Petr Atoyan Stadium; Attendance: 2,300; Referee: Aidyn Rakhimbaev

22 April 2022 7	Astana	4–0	Caspiy	Nur-Sultan
20:00 (UTC+6)	Vloet 14', 27'; Manzorro (yellow card) 23'; Ebong 42'; T.Kusyapov (yellow card) 49'; Tomasov 59'; Beskorovaynyi (yellow card) 87'	Report	Cuckić (yellow card) 71'; Narzildayev (yellow card) 82'	Stadium: Astana Arena; Attendance: 1,500; Referee: Denis Izmailov

26 April 2022 8	Tobol	1–1	Astana	Kostanay
20:00 (UTC+6)	Tomašević 32'; Jovančić (yellow card) 79'; Zhaksylykov (yellow card) 86'; Tošić (yellow card) 90+3'; Amanović (yellow card) 90+6'	Report	Tomasov (yellow card) 8'; Milošević (yellow card) 45+4'; T.Kusyapov (yellow card) 48'; Eugénio 54'; Beskorovaynyi (yellow card) 67'; Manzorro (yellow card) 90+6'	Stadium: Central Stadium; Attendance: 3,000; Referee: Elvira Nurmustafina

1 May 2022 9	Astana	3–3	Turan	Nur-Sultan
16:00 (UTC+6)	Tomasov (penalty missed) 10'; Ebong (yellow card) 22'; Eugénio 26', 53'; Vloet 73'	Report	A.Mukhamed 5'; Diakate 40' (yellow card) 90+6'; Musabekov 45+3'; S.Abzalov (yellow card) 52'; Skvortsov (yellow card) 74'	Stadium: Astana Arena; Attendance: 0 Referee: Artem Kuchin

7 May 2022 10	Ordabasy	1–2	Astana	Shymkent
16:00 (UTC+6)	Sadovsky (yellow card) 3'; Nyuiadzi 44' (yellow card) 45+4'	Report	Eugénio 16'; S.Sagnayev (yellow card) 90+2'; Basmanov 90+5'	Stadium: Kazhymukan Munaitpasov Stadium; Attendance: 9,500; Referee: Alexander Zatula

14 May 2022 11	Astana	6–0	Kairat	Nur-Sultan
18:00 (UTC+6)	Manzorro (yellow card) 16'; Tomasov 19', 44', 63'; Vloet 36'; Eugénio 48', 70'; Hovhannisyan (yellow card) 77'	Report	Góralski 33'; Astanov (yellow card) 49'; Seydakhmet (yellow card) 57'; Jaloliddinov (yellow card) 60'	Stadium: Astana Arena; Attendance: 12,500; Referee: Alexander Gauser

21 May 2022 12	Atyrau	1–1	Astana	Atyrau
19:00 (UTC+6)	A.Nabikhanov (yellow card) 33'; Tarasov (yellow card) 51'; A.Sokolenko (yellow card) 66'; D.Pletnev (yellow card) 68'; Takulov (yellow card) 73'; Filipović 75' (yellow card) 82'; Petrović (yellow card) 89'	Report	Manzorro (yellow card) 44' (yellow-red card) 73'; Rakhmanaw (yellow card) 68'; Basmanov 90+4'	Stadium: Munaishy Stadium; Attendance: 5,000; Referee: Rustam Omarov

19 June 2022 13	Astana	5–0	Aksu	Nur-Sultan
21:00 (UTC+6)	Aymbetov 32'; Tomasov 42' Vloet 68'; Basmanov 77'; Pertsukh 89'	Report	Zadoya (yellow card) 20'	Stadium: Astana Arena; Attendance: 2,000; Referee: Aidyn Rakhimbaev

26 June 2022 14	Aktobe	4–1	Astana	Aktobe
21:00 (UTC+6)	Vidémont 18'; China 33'; Yerlanov (yellow card) 45+2'; Kasym 72'; Samorodov 90+5'	Report	Beysebekov (yellow card) 28'; Darabayev 42'; Beskorovaynyi (yellow card) 71'; Vloet (yellow card) 83'; Bryan (yellow card) 87'	Stadium: Central Stadium; Attendance: 13,400; Referee: Grigory Moskovchenko

3 July 2022 15	Astana	4–0	Maktaaral	Nur-Sultan
19:00 (UTC+6)	Tomasov 61', 74' (pen.), 75'; S.Sagnayev 89'	Report	Sebaihi (yellow card) 20'; Akhmatov (yellow card) 48'; R.Dzhumatov (yellow card) 55'; J-A.Payruz (yellow card) 71'; Litovchenko (yellow card) 72'	Stadium: Astana Arena; Attendance: 2,500; Referee: Bagdat Abdullayev

21 August 2022 16	Astana	1–0	Kyzylzhar	Nur-Sultan
16:00 (UTC+6)	Eugénio 10' (yellow card) 87'; Ebong (yellow card) 27'; Palyakow (yellow card) 54'; Darabayev (yellow card) 63'	Report	Tapalov (yellow card) 22'; Yakovlev (yellow card) 46'	Stadium: Astana Arena; Attendance: 1,300; Referee: Bagdat Abdullaev

27 August 2022 17	Taraz	1–1	Astana	Taraz
19:00 (UTC+6)	A.Zhumabek 19'; A.Kenesbek (yellow card) 36' (yellow-red card) 90+2'; Junior (yellow card) 38'; Dehtyarov (yellow card) 90'	Report	Dosmagambetov (yellow card) 23'; Lebon 81'	Stadium: Central Stadium; Attendance: 9,000; Referee: Anton Kuchma

5 September 2022 18	Astana	4–0	Akzhayik	Nur-Sultan
21:00 (UTC+6)	Palyakow 32'; T.Kusyapov (yellow card) 74'; Eugénio 84', 85'; Tomasov 90+2'	Report	Sabino (yellow card) 43' (yellow-red card) 87'	Stadium: Astana Arena; Attendance: 1,500; Referee: Sakhi Daniyar

10 September 2022 19	Caspiy	0–3	Astana	Aktau
18:00 (UTC+6)	Brígido (yellow card) 12'	Report	Aymbetov 29'; T.Kusyapov 65'; Eugénio 90+5'	Stadium: Zhastar Stadium; Attendance: 2,000; Referee: Alexander Gauser

14 September 2022 20	Astana	1–2	Tobol	Astana
19:00 (UTC+6)	Tomasov (penalty missed) 24'; A.Zarutskiy (yellow card) 29'; Aymbetov 35'; Beysebekov (yellow card) 90+4'	Report	Muzhikov 30' (pen.); Malyi (yellow card) 35' (goal) 71'; Tagybergen (yellow card) 66'; Vasilyev (yellow card) 89'	Stadium: Astana Arena; Attendance: 3,200; Referee: Sariev Bulat
Note: On 13 September, Nur-Sultan was renamed back to Astana.

2 October 2022 21	Turan	2–2	Astana	Turkistan
18:00 (UTC+6)	Rudoselsky (yellow card) 42'; B.Zulfikarov 46'; Gurenko 60'; K.Taipov (yellow card) 90+4'; T.Amirov (yellow card) 90+6'	Report	Eugénio (penalty missed) 42'; Aymbetov 82'; Tomasov 90+6' (pen.)	Stadium: Turkistan Arena; Attendance: 3,500; Referee: Anton Kuchma

9 October 2022 22	Astana	6–0	Ordabasy	Astana
18:00 (UTC+6)	Tomasov 47'; Kuat (yellow card) 54'; Aymbetov 57', 59', 62'; Manzorro (yellow card) 67'; Eugénio 90+3'; Beysebekov 90+4'	Report	Baradzin (yellow card) 63'	Stadium: Astana Arena; Attendance: 3,200; Referee: Artem Kuchin

15 October 2022 23	Kairat	0–4	Astana	Almaty
17:00 (UTC+6)	Bagnack (yellow card) 24' (yellow-red card) 87'; A.Ulshin (yellow card) 35'; Ustimenko (yellow card) 90+4'	Report	Tomasov (penalty missed) 6'; Dosmagambetov 11', 59', 88' (pen.), 90'; Aymbetov (yellow card) 45'; Kuat (yellow card) 76'; Ebong (yellow card) 90+1'	Stadium: Central Stadium; Attendance: 14,000; Referee: Denis Tevyashov

23 October 2022 24	Astana	5–1	Atyrau	Astana
16:00 (UTC+6)	Aymbetov 7'; Eugénio 10', 45+2', 67'; Gabyshev (yellow card) 47'; Tomasov 61'	Report	A.Sokolenko (yellow card) 12'; Dolgov 48'	Stadium: Astana Arena; Attendance: 6,500; Referee: Alexander Gauser

30 October 2022 25	Kyzylzhar	0–2	Astana	Petropavl
17:00 (UTC+6)	Tapalov (yellow card) 49'	Report	Aymbetov 40'; Eugénio 59'	Stadium: Karasai Stadium; Attendance: 2,500; Referee: Rustam Omarov

6 November 2022 26	Shakhter Karagandy	2–3	Astana	Karaganda
15:00 (UTC+6)	Đ.Ćosić (yellow card) 17'; Poznyak (yellow card) 24'; Chogadze 43'; Kobzar 81'	Report	Tomasov (penalty missed) 17' 38', 61'; Eugénio 27' (pen.); Kuat (yellow card) 47'	Stadium: Shakhter Stadium; Attendance: 1,500; Referee: Denis Tevyashov

==== League table ====
Pos	Team	Pld	W	D	L	GF	GA	GD	Pts	Qualification or relegation
1	Astana (C)	26	16	5	5	65	24	+41	53	Qualification for the Champions League first qualifying round
2	Aktobe	26	16	4	6	43	28	+15	52	Qualification for the Europa Conference League second qualifying round
3	Tobol	26	14	5	7	46	33	+13	47	Qualification for the Europa Conference League first qualifying round
4	Kairat	26	12	6	8	34	36	−2	42	
5	Ordabasy (Note: Qualified as cup winners)	26	11	5	10	36	39	−3	38	Qualification for the Europa Conference League second qualifying round

Source: UEFA, Soccerway
Rules for classification: 1) Points; 2) Goal difference; 3) Matches won; 4) Goals scored; 5) Away goals scored; 6) Head-to-head points; 7) Head-to-head matches won; 8) Head-to-head goal difference; 9) Head-to-head goals scored; 10) Head-to-head away goals scored; 11) Draw.
(C) Champions

=== Kazakhstan Cup ===
==== Group stage ====
Pos	Team	Pld	W	D	L	GF	GA	GD	Pts	Qualification
1	Astana	6	3	3	0	17	7	+10	12	Advanced to Quarterfinals
2	Shakhter Karagandy	6	3	1	2	13	14	−1	10	Advanced to Quarterfinals
3	Turan	6	1	2	3	5	9	−4	5	
4	Zhetysu	6	0	4	2	4	9	−5	4	

Updated to match(es) played on 14 August 2022. Source: PFLK

8 July 2022 1	Zhetysu	0–0	Astana	Taldykorgan
18:00 (UTC+6)	I.Amirseitov (yellow card) 25'; A.Pasechenko (yellow card) 25'; Chepurnenko (yellow card) 84'; A.Baltabekov (yellow card) 90+3'	Report	S.Sovet (yellow card) 75'	Stadium: Zhetysu Stadium; Attendance: 1,700; Referee: Danil Gorda

15 July 2022 2	Astana	5–2	Shakhter Karagandy	Nur-Sultan
19:00 (UTC+6)	Eugénio 17'; Vloet 42', 44'; Pertsukh 50', 90+2'	Report	Murtazayev (penalty missed) 28'; Rustemović 36' (yellow card) 77'; Kobzar 88' (pen.)	Stadium: Astana Arena; Attendance: 3,200; Referee: Daniyar Sakhi

24 July 2022 3	Turan	1–1	Astana	Turkistan
19:00 (UTC+6)	B.Kabylan 47'	Report	Aymbetov 65'; Beskorovaynyi (yellow card) 76'	Stadium: Turkistan Arena; Attendance: 1,000; Referee: Rustam Omarov

31 July 2022 4	Astana	2–1	Turan	Nur-Sultan
19:00 (UTC+6)	Eugénio 2', 26'; Basmanov (yellow card) 36'; Vloet (yellow card) 42'; Darabayev (yellow card) 68'	Report	Z.Ceklic (yellow card) 15'; Fazli 58'; Diakate (yellow card) FT	Stadium: Astana Arena; Attendance: 1,300; Referee: Artem Kuchin

7 August 2022 5	Astana	2–2	Zhetysu	Nur-Sultan
19:00 (UTC+6)	Manzorro 12', 90+1' (pen.); T.Kusyapov (yellow card) 58'	Report	M.Khassein (yellow card) 6'; Turysbek 7'; Y.Rustemov (yellow card) 32'; I.Pogrebnyak (yellow card) 89'; N.Nurbergen 90+5'	Stadium: Astana Arena; Attendance: 1,300; Referee: Elvira Nurmustafina

14 August 2022 6	Shakhter Karagandy	1–7	Astana	Karaganda
19:00 (UTC+6)	D.Blokhin (yellow card) 37'; B.Savkiv (yellow card) 79'; S.Flyuk 90'	Report	T.Kusyapov 9'; Eugénio 50', 59', 65'; Manzorro 76'; S.Sagnayev 88'; Basmanov 90+4'	Stadium: Shakhter Stadium; Attendance: 4,500; Referee: Sergey Gorohovodatsky

==== Knockout stage ====
31 August 2022 Quarterfinal	Astana	1–0	Maktaaral	Nur-Sultan
21:00 (UTC+6)	Lebon 90'	Report	G.Kenzhebek (yellow card) 13'; Nosko (yellow card) 40'	Stadium: Astana Arena; Attendance: 1,500; Referee: Bayimbet Saken

19 October 2022 Semifinal	Astana	2–3	Ordabasy	Astana
19:00 (UTC+6)	S.Sagnayev (yellow card) 2'; Prokopenko 32' (pen.), 39'; Z.Kalmakhambet (yellow card) 48'	Report	D.Kanatkali 22' (o.g.); B.Shayzada (yellow card) 33'; S.Tursynbay (yellow card) 43'; L.Guedes 65'; Nyuiadzi 90+8'	Stadium: Astana Arena; Attendance: 2,200; Referee: Saken Bayimbet

=== UEFA Europa Conference League ===
==== Qualifying rounds ====
22 July 2022 Second qualifying round 1st leg	Raków Częstochowa (Poland)	5–0	(Kazakhstan) Astana	Częstochowa, Poland
00:00 (UTC+6)	Ivi 4'; Sorescu (yellow card) 11' (yellow-red card) 21'; Racovițan (yellow card) 32'; Wdowiak 42'; Gutkovskis 66'; Kocherhin 77'; Tudor 90+4' (pen.)	Report	Manzorro (yellow card) 12'; Darabayev (yellow card) 29' (yellow-red card) 62'; T.Kusyapov (yellow card) 47'; Dosmagambetov (yellow card) 69'; Beskorovaynyi (yellow card) 90+3'	Stadium: Miejski Stadion Piłkarski "Raków"; Attendance: 5,324; Referee: Goga Kikacheishvili (Georgia)

28 July 2022 Second qualifying round 2nd leg	Astana (Kazakhstan)	0–1 (0–6 agg.)	(Poland) Raków Częstochowa	Nur-Sultan, Kazakhstan
21:00 (UTC+6)	Gabyshev (yellow card) 45+2'; Ebong (yellow card) 69'	Report	Kocherhin 16'; Arsenić (yellow card) 21'; Musiolik (yellow card) 32'	Stadium: Astana Arena; Attendance: 8,569; Referee: Tomas Klima (Czech Republic)

== Squad statistics ==
As of match played 6 November 2022

=== Appearances and goals ===
No.	Pos	Nat	Player	Total		Premier League		Kazakhstan Cup		UEFA Europa Conference League	
No.	Pos	Nat	Player	Apps	Goals	Apps	Goals	Apps	Goals	Apps	Goals
3	DF	(Belarus) BLR	Artsyom Rakhmanaw	14	0	7+6	0	1	0	0	0
5	DF	(Kazakhstan) KAZ	Mikhail Gabyshev	11	0	3+2	0	4	0	2	0
6	DF	(Brazil) BRA	Bryan	26	0	14+4	0	4+2	0	2	0
7	MF	(Belarus) BLR	Max Ebong	26	2	22+1	2	1	0	2	0
8	MF	(Kazakhstan) KAZ	Islambek Kuat	11	0	6+5	0	0	0	0	0
10	MF	(Croatia) CRO	Marin Tomasov	29	15	25	15	3+1	0	0	0
11	MF	(Kazakhstan) KAZ	Aslan Darabayev	30	2	23+1	2	4+1	0	1	0
13	DF	(Armenia) ARM	Kamo Hovhannisyan	26	0	23+1	0	1+1	0	0	0
14	MF	(France) FRA	Jérémy Manzorro	24	3	16+3	0	3	3	2	0
15	DF	(Kazakhstan) KAZ	Abzal Beysebekov	22	1	11+7	1	0+4	0	0	0
17	FW	(Kazakhstan) KAZ	Abat Aymbetov	23	10	10+9	9	1+1	1	1+1	0
19	FW	(France) FRA	Keelan Lebon	13	2	3+8	1	0+2	1	0	0
20	FW	(Kazakhstan) KAZ	Vladislav Prokopenko	8	2	1+3	0	3+1	2	0	0
22	MF	(Kazakhstan) KAZ	Sultan Sagnayev	15	2	0+10	1	4+1	1	0	0
23	DF	(Belarus) BLR	Dzyanis Palyakow	24	1	18	1	3+1	0	2	0
27	MF	(Kazakhstan) KAZ	Timur Dosmagambetov	17	4	9+1	4	4+1	0	1+1	0
28	MF	(Kazakhstan) KAZ	Yury Pertsukh	17	3	1+8	1	5+1	2	0+2	0
31	GK	(Kazakhstan) KAZ	Danil Podymksy	1	0	0	0	1	0	0	0
32	DF	(Kazakhstan) KAZ	Talgat Kusyapov	21	2	12+2	1	4+1	1	2	0
33	DF	(Ukraine) UKR	Danylo Beskorovaynyi	28	0	16+4	0	5+1	0	1+1	0
34	GK	(Serbia) SRB	Marko Milošević	19	0	15	0	3	0	1	0
52	DF	(Kazakhstan) KAZ	Rakhat Maratov	1	0	0	0	1	0	0	0
55	GK	(Kazakhstan) KAZ	Aleksandr Zarutskiy	16	0	11	0	4	0	1	0
57	DF	(Kazakhstan) KAZ	Sanzhar Shurakhanov	1	0	0	0	1	0	0	0
58	MF	(Kazakhstan) KAZ	Azamat Nurzhanuly	3	0	0	0	2+1	0	0	0
63	DF	(Kazakhstan) KAZ	Dias Kanatkali	3	0	0	0	1+2	0	0	0
66	MF	(Kazakhstan) KAZ	Olzhas Adil	3	0	0	0	1+2	0	0	0
68	MF	(Kazakhstan) KAZ	Makhmud Dunzurov	1	0	0	0	0+1	0	0	0
72	FW	(Kazakhstan) KAZ	Stanislav Basmanov	28	4	1+18	3	4+3	1	0+2	0
77	MF	(Portugal) POR	Pedro Eugénio	31	24	25	18	4	6	2	0
79	MF	(Kazakhstan) KAZ	Salamat Zhumabekov	4	0	0	0	1+3	0	0	0
85	MF	(Kazakhstan) KAZ	Valikhan Tyulyupov	1	0	0	0	0+1	0	0	0
84	MF	(Kazakhstan) KAZ	Alikhan Umbitaliev	1	0	0	0	0+1	0	0	0
87	MF	(Kazakhstan) KAZ	Zhasasyn Kalmakhambet	1	0	0	0	1	0	0	0
89	DF	(Kazakhstan) KAZ	Bauyrzhan Akhaev	3	0	0	0	3	0	0	0
90	FW	(Kazakhstan) KAZ	Ruslan Kirgetov	3	0	0	0	2+1	0	0	0
94	DF	(Kazakhstan) KAZ	Yuri Akhanov	1	0	0	0	1	0	0	0
Players away from Astana on loan:
18	DF	(Kazakhstan) KAZ	Sagi Sovet	8	0	3+2	0	3	0	0	0
Players who left Astana during the season:
9	MF	(Netherlands) NED	Rai Vloet	19	7	11+3	5	3	2	2	0
21	FW	(Liberia) LBR	Mohammed Kamara	2	0	1+1	0	0	0	0	0

=== Goal scorers ===
Place	Position	Nation	Number	Name	Premier League	Kazakhstan Cup	UEFA Europa Conference League	Total
1	MF	(Portugal)	77	Pedro Eugénio	18	6	0	24
2	MF	(Croatia)	10	Marin Tomasov	15	0	0	15
3	FW	(Kazakhstan)	17	Abat Aymbetov	9	1	0	10
4	MF	(Netherlands)	9	Rai Vloet	5	2	0	7
5	MF	(Kazakhstan)	27	Timur Dosmagambetov	4	0	0	4
5	FW	(Kazakhstan)	72	Stanislav Basmanov	3	1	0	4
7	MF	(Kazakhstan)	28	Yury Pertsukh	1	2	0	3
7	MF	(France)	14	Jérémy Manzorro	0	3	0	3
9	MF	(Belarus)	7	Max Ebong	2	0	0	2
9	MF	(Kazakhstan)	11	Aslan Darabayev	2	0	0	2
9	MF	(Kazakhstan)	22	Sultan Sagnayev	1	1	0	2
9	FW	(France)	19	Keelan Lebon	1	1	0	2
9	DF	(Kazakhstan)	32	Talgat Kusyapov	1	1	0	2
9	FW	(Kazakhstan)	20	Vladislav Prokopenko	0	2	0	2
14	DF	(Belarus)	23	Dzyanis Palyakow	1	0	0	1
14	DF	(Kazakhstan)	15	Abzal Beysebekov	1	0	0	1
14				Own goal	1	0	0	1
				TOTALS	65	20	0	86

=== Clean sheets ===
Place	Position	Nation	Number	Name	Premier League	Kazakhstan Cup	UEFA Europa Conference League	Total
1	GK	(Serbia)	34	Marko Milošević	6	1	0	7
1	GK	(Kazakhstan)	55	Aleksandr Zarutskiy	6	1	0	7
				TOTALS	12	2	0	14

=== Disciplinary record ===
Number	Nation	Position	Name	Premier League		Kazakhstan Cup		UEFA Europa Conference League		Total	
Number	Nation	Position	Name	Booked	Sent off (straight red)	Booked	Sent off (straight red)	Booked	Sent off (straight red)	Booked	Sent off (straight red)
3	(Belarus)	DF	Artsyom Rakhmanaw	1	0	0	0	0	0	1	0
5	(Kazakhstan)	DF	Mikhail Gabyshev	1	0	0	0	1	0	2	0
6	(Brazil)	DF	Bryan	1	0	0	0	0	0	1	0
7	(Belarus)	MF	Max Ebong	4	0	0	0	1	0	5	0
8	(Kazakhstan)	MF	Islambek Kuat	5	0	0	0	0	0	5	0
10	(Croatia)	MF	Marin Tomasov	2	0	0	0	0	0	2	0
11	(Kazakhstan)	MF	Aslan Darabayev	3	0	1	0	2	1	6	1
13	(Armenia)	DF	Kamo Hovhannisyan	2	0	0	0	0	0	2	0
14	(France)	MF	Jérémy Manzorro	6	1	0	0	1	0	7	1
15	(Kazakhstan)	DF	Abzal Beysebekov	3	0	0	0	0	0	3	0
17	(Kazakhstan)	FW	Abat Aymbetov	1	0	0	0	0	0	1	0
22	(Kazakhstan)	MF	Sultan Sagnayev	1	0	1	0	0	0	2	0
23	(Belarus)	DF	Dzyanis Palyakow	2	0	0	0	0	0	2	0
27	(Kazakhstan)	MF	Timur Dosmagambetov	1	0	0	0	1	0	2	0
32	(Kazakhstan)	DF	Talgat Kusyapov	3	0	1	0	1	0	4	0
33	(Ukraine)	DF	Danylo Beskorovaynyi	4	0	1	0	1	0	6	0
34	(Serbia)	GK	Marko Milošević	2	0	0	0	0	0	2	0
55	(Kazakhstan)	GK	Aleksandr Zarutskiy	1	0	0	0	0	0	1	0
72	(Kazakhstan)	FW	Stanislav Basmanov	0	0	1	0	0	0	1	0
77	(Portugal)	MF	Pedro Eugénio	1	0	0	0	0	0	1	0
87	(Kazakhstan)	MF	Zhasasyn Kalmakhambet	0	0	1	0	0	0	1	0
Players away on loan:
18	(Kazakhstan)	DF	Sagi Sovet	0	0	1	0	0	0	1	0
Players who left Astana during the season:
9	(Netherlands)	MF	Rai Vloet	1	0	1	0	0	0	2	0
			TOTALS	45	1	8	0	8	1	61	2
