= 2022 Kazakhstan Cup =

Tournament details
- Country: Kazakhstan
- Teams: 30

Final positions
- Champions: Ordabasy
- Runners-up: Akzhayik

Tournament statistics
- Matches played: 69
- Goals scored: 213 (3.09 per match)
- Top goal scorer: Toma Tabatadze (8)
- All statistics correct as of 12 November 2022.

The 2022 Kazakhstan Cup (known as the OLIMPBET Kazakhstan Cup for sponsorship reasons) was the 30th season of the Kazakhstan Cup, the annual nationwide football cup competition of Kazakhstan since the independence of the country. The winners qualified for the 2023–24 UEFA Europa Conference League second qualifying round. FC Kairat were the defending champions, having beaten FC Shakhter Karagandy in the previous final.

== Participating clubs ==
The following teams entered the competition:

Kazakhstan Premier League all 14 clubs of the 2022 season	Kazakhstan First League; 9 clubs of the 2022 season	Kazakhstan Second League; 7 clubs of the 2022 season
FC Aksu; FC Aktobe; FC Atyrau; FC Akzhayik; FC Astana; FC Caspiy; FC Kairat; FC Kyzylzhar; FC Maktaaral; FC Ordabasy; FC Shakhter Karagandy; FC Taraz; FC Tobol; FC Turan	FC Akademia Ontustik; FC Igilik; FC Kaisar; FC Kyran; FC Okzhetpes; FC Yassi; FC Zhenis; FC Zhetysu; FC Baikonur	FC Altai; FC Aqtobe City; FC Arys; FC Khan-Tengri; FC SD Family; FC Zhas Kyran; FC Zhas Sunkar

== Format and schedule ==
Round	Clubs remaining	Clubs involved	First match date
First preliminary round	30	16	6 April 2022
Second preliminary round	22	8	12 April 2022
Third preliminary round	18	4	4 May 2022
Group Stage	16	16	8 July 2022
Quarter-finals	8	8	31 August 2022
Semi-finals	4	4	19 October 2022
Final	2	2	12 November 2022

== Preliminary rounds ==
Nine Kazakhstan First League clubs and seven Kazakhstan Second League clubs competed for two entries in the group stage.

=== First preliminary round ===
6 April 2022	Igilik	1–2	Zhenis	Taraz
14:00 (UTC+6)	Ordabek 5'	Report	Kuanyshkaliev 19'; Elemesov 90'	Attendance: 200; Referee: Vladimir Niklevich

6 April 2022	Kyran	0–3	Akademia Ontustik	Shymkent
15:00 (UTC+6)		Report	Serikkul 68'; Afanasenko 74'; Abilov 79'	Attendance: 200; Referee: Maksim Bogdanov

6 April 2022	Aqtobe City	2–1 (a.e.t.)	Arys	Aktobe
15:00 (UTC+6)	Lisenkov 64'; Mamirbaev 108' (o.g.)	Report	Esengeldy 38'	Attendance: 1,000; Referee: Nariman Talapkerov

6 April 2022	Kaisar	2–0	Okzhetpes	Kyzylorda
16:00 (UTC+6)	Sidarenka 40'; Sakhalbaev 48'	Report		Attendance: 2,000; Referee: Daniyar Kurbanov

6 April 2022	Yassi	0–0 (a.e.t.) (2–1 p)	Khan-Tengri	Arys
16:00 (UTC+6)		Report		Attendance: 150; Referee: Mikhail Bildinov

6 April 2022	Zhetysu	4–0	Altai	Taldykorgan
16:00 (UTC+6)	Mikhaylov 34'; Nurbol 77'; Akyltayuly 79' (o.g.); Sikoyev 89'	Report		Attendance: 2000; Referee: Sanzhar Iskakov

6 April 2022	SD Family	1–1 (a.e.t.) (5–6 p)	Zhas Kyran	Nur-Sultan
16:00 (UTC+6)	Zhanabaev 78'	Report	Zhaysanbek 69'	Attendance: 300; Referee: Dmitriy Vishnyakov

7 April 2022	Baikonur	1–4	Zhas Sunkar	Kyzylorda
16:00 (UTC+6)	Isakhozhaev 60'	Report	Nurbay 7'; Torekul 44', 84'; Tuleev 56'	Attendance: 300; Referee: Anton Moltusinov

=== Second preliminary round ===
12 April 2022	Aqtobe City	0–0 (a.e.t.) (2–3 p)	Zhetysu	Aktobe
15:00 (UTC+6)		Report		Stadium: SDYuSShOR No. 8 Stadium; Attendance: 700; Referee: Danil Gorda

12 April 2022	Akademia Ontustik	2–3	Zhenis	Shymkent
16:00 (UTC+6)	Amangeldy 70'; Narkulov 73'	Report	Uteshev 25'; Smykov 69'; Batyrkhanov 89'	Stadium: BIIK Stadium; Attendance: 70; Referee: Aleksandr Aliev

12 April 2022	Yassi	2–0	Zhas Kyran	Arys
16:00 (UTC+6)	Abuov 56'; Ashirbay 90+3'	Report		Attendance: 200; Referee: Ruslan Sultangaliev

12 April 2022	Kaisar	1–0	Zhas Sunkar	Kyzylorda
17:00 (UTC+6)	Anuarbekov 49'	Report		Stadium: Gani Muratbayev Stadium; Attendance: 700; Referee: Sayat Sulikanov

=== Third preliminary round ===
4 May 2022	Zhetysu	2–1 (a.e.t.)	Zhenis	Taldykorgan
15:00 (UTC+6)	Atykhanov 79'; Mikhaylov 111'	Report	Cheredinov 17'	Stadium: Zhetysu Stadium; Attendance: 2,000; Referee: Erken Zhantuganov

4 May 2022	Kaisar	3–0	Yassi	Kyzylorda
18:00 (UTC+6)	Diallo 20'; Makhan 31', 90+3'	Report		Stadium: Gani Muratbayev Stadium; Attendance: 2,500; Referee: Galymzhan Kenzhalinov

== Group stage ==
The 14 Kazakhstan Premier League clubs were drawn into four groups along with the two remaining teams from the preliminary rounds. The top two teams in each group advanced to the knockout stage.

=== Group A ===
Pos	Team	Pld	W	D	L	GF	GA	GD	Pts	Qualification
1	Kairat (A)	6	5	1	0	15	6	+9	16	Advanced to Quarterfinals
2	Ordabasy (A)	6	3	0	3	9	8	+1	9	Advanced to Quarterfinals
3	Atyrau	6	2	1	3	6	11	−5	7	
4	Aksu	6	0	2	4	3	8	−5	2	

Updated to match(es) played on 13 August 2022. Source: PFLK
(A) Advance to a further round

8 July 2022	Aksu	0–1	Atyrau	Pavlodar
21:00 (UTC+6)		Report	Grzelchak 87'	Stadium: Central Stadium; Attendance: 1,500; Referee: Artyom Kuchin

9 July 2022	Kairat	2–0	Ordabasy	Almaty
19:00 (UTC+6)	Paulo 18'; Sadybekov 48'	Report		Stadium: Central Stadium; Attendance: 3,648; Referee: Sayat Karabaev

15 July 2022	Atyrau	2–3	Kairat	Atyrau
19:00 (UTC+6)	Bissi da Silva 16', 83'	Report	Ulshin 19'; Sadybekov 43'; Vasin 57'	Stadium: Munaishy Stadium; Attendance: 3,000; Referee: Aleksandr Zatula

17 July 2022	Ordabasy	2–0	Aksu	Shymkent
20:00 (UTC+6)	Fedin 10'; Sultanov 17'	Report		Stadium: Kazhymukan Munaitpasov Stadium; Attendance: 6,500; Referee: Bolat Karlibaev

22 July 2022	Atyrau	1–4	Ordabasy	Atyrau
19:00 (UTC+6)	Filipović 90+6'	Report	Guedes 43'; Astanov 45'; Fedin 73'; Khalmatov 89'	Stadium: Munaishy Stadium; Attendance: 2,500; Referee: Georgiy Chekhovskiy

24 July 2022	Kairat	3–2	Aksu	Almaty
21:00 (UTC+6)	Shvyryov 37'; Shushenachev 58'; Alykulov 79'	Report	Smailov 55'; Turlybek 90+1'	Stadium: Central Stadium; Attendance: 0 Referee: Sergey Nozhenko

29 July 2022	Ordabasy	1–2	Atyrau	Shymkent
19:00 (UTC+6)	Astanov 19'	Report	Filipović 11'; Petrović 71'	Stadium: Kazhymukan Munaitpasov Stadium; Attendance: 4,700; Referee: Daniyar Sakhi

31 July 2022	Aksu	1–1	Kairat	Pavlodar
21:00 (UTC+6)	Marat 1'	Report	Seydakhmet 24'	Stadium: Central Stadium; Attendance: 0 Referee: Aleksandr Gauzer

6 August 2022	Atyrau	0–0	Aksu	Atyrau
19:00 (UTC+6)		Report		Stadium: Munaishy Stadium; Attendance: 2,500; Referee: Timur Kumashev

7 August 2022	Ordabasy	1–3	Kairat	Shymkent
21:00 (UTC+6)	Nyuiadzi 62'	Report	Paulo 3'; Shushenachev 71'; Alykulov 86'	Stadium: Kazhymukan Munaitpasov Stadium; Attendance: 9,500; Referee: Anton Kuchma

13 August 2022	Kairat	3–0	Atyrau	Almaty
21:00 (UTC+6)	Keyler 8'; Usenov 24'; Shvyryov 90+7'	Report		Stadium: Central Stadium; Attendance: 2,000; Referee: Artyom Kuchin

13 August 2022	Aksu	0–1	Ordabasy	Pavlodar
21:00 (UTC+6)		Report	Guedes 24'	Stadium: Central Stadium; Attendance: 2,000; Referee: Saken Baiymbet

=== Group B ===
Pos	Team	Pld	W	D	L	GF	GA	GD	Pts	Qualification
1	Kaisar (A)	6	4	1	1	11	7	+4	13	Advanced to Quarterfinals
2	Akzhayik (A)	6	3	1	2	9	6	+3	10	Advanced to Quarterfinals
3	Caspiy	6	3	1	2	10	9	+1	10	
4	Kyzyl-Zhar	6	0	1	5	4	12	−8	1	

Updated to match(es) played on 14 August 2022. Source: PFLK
(A) Advance to a further round

8 July 2022	Kaisar	1–0	Akzhayik	Kyzylorda
21:00 (UTC+6)	Diallo 84'	Report		Stadium: Gani Muratbayev Stadium; Attendance: 3,000; Referee: Arman Ismuratov

10 July 2022	Caspiy	1–1	Kyzyl-Zhar	Aktau
19:00 (UTC+6)	Nurgaliyev 50'	Report	Yakovlev 6'	Stadium: Zhas Kanat Stadium; Attendance: 0 Referee: Sergey Nozhenko

16 July 2022	Kyzyl-Zhar	1–2	Kaisar	Petropavl
18:00 (UTC+6)	Lobjanidze 21'	Report	Altynbekov 15'; Sidarenka 89'	Stadium: Karasai Stadium; Attendance: 2,000; Referee: Bulat Sariev

17 July 2022	Akzhayik	3–1	Caspiy	Oral
19:00 (UTC+6)	Tabatadze 49', 58'; Kovalenko 60'	Report	Kireyenko 39'	Stadium: Petr Atoyan Stadium; Attendance: 1,000; Referee: Grigoriy Moskovchenko

23 July 2022	Caspiy	1–2	Kaisar	Aktau
19:00 (UTC+6)	Teles 90+2'	Report	Diallo 34', 45+2'	Stadium: Zhas Kanat Stadium; Attendance: 0 Referee: Timur Kumashev

24 July 2022	Akzhayik	1–0	Kyzyl-Zhar	Oral
19:00 (UTC+6)	Tabatadze 51'	Report		Stadium: Petr Atoyan Stadium; Attendance: 0 Referee: Aydyn Tasybaev

29 July 2022	Kaisar	1–2	Caspiy	Kyzylorda
19:00 (UTC+6)	Oliveira 87'	Report	Nurgaliyev 56'; Tigroudja 82'	Stadium: Gani Muratbayev Stadium; Attendance: 2,000; Referee: Sayat Sulikanov

31 July 2022	Kyzyl-Zhar	0–2	Akzhayik	Nur-Sultan
15:00 (UTC+6)		Report	Kovalenko 38'; Badoyan 88'	Stadium: Astana Arena; Attendance: 0 Referee: Saken Baiymbet

5 August 2022	Akzhayik	2–2	Kaisar	Oral
17:00 (UTC+6)	Tabatadze 16'; Gazdanov 90+7'	Report	Gorshunov 10'; Kurmanbekuly 49'	Stadium: Petr Atoyan Stadium; Attendance: 1,000; Referee: Sayat Karabaev

7 August 2022	Kyzyl-Zhar	1–3	Caspiy	Petropavl
18:00 (UTC+6)	Suley 14' (o.g.)	Report	Pešić 63', 76'; Berdibek 84'	Attendance: 2,000; Referee: Rustam Omarov

13 August 2022	Caspiy	2–1	Akzhayik	Aktau
19:00 (UTC+6)	Narzildayev 45+2'; Baranovskyi 62'	Report	Tabatadze 68'	Stadium: Zhas Kanat Stadium; Attendance: 1,500; Referee: Grigoriy Moskovchenko

14 August 2022	Kaisar	3–1	Kyzyl-Zhar	Kyzylorda
21:00 (UTC+6)	Sidarenka 11', 23'; Sakhalbaev 63'	Report	Chikanchi 22'	Stadium: Gani Muratbayev Stadium; Attendance: 1,500; Referee: Ruslan Sultangaliev

=== Group C ===
Pos	Team	Pld	W	D	L	GF	GA	GD	Pts	Qualification
1	Taraz (A)	6	3	3	0	17	8	+9	12	Advanced to Quarterfinals
2	Maktaaral (A)	6	3	1	2	11	9	+2	10	Advanced to Quarterfinals
3	Aktobe	6	2	2	2	6	6	0	8	
4	Tobol	6	1	0	5	7	18	−11	3	

Updated to match(es) played on 14 August 2022. Source: PFLK
(A) Advance to a further round

9 July 2022	Taraz	6–1	Tobol	Taraz
21:00 (UTC+6)	Karaman 14'; Kuantayev 17'; Junior 57'; Gadrani 77'; Shakhmetov 82'; Baytana 87'	Report	Zhaksylykov 60'	Stadium: Central Stadium; Attendance: 5,500; Referee: Aydyn Tasybaev

9 July 2022	Maktaaral	3–2	Aktobe	Turkistan
21:00 (UTC+6)	Karimov 40'; Bruno 47'; Kenzhebek 68'	Report	Kenesov 33'; Balashov 45+3'	Stadium: Turkistan Arena; Attendance: 1,500; Referee: Saken Baiymbet

16 July 2022	Tobol	2–1	Aktobe	Kostanay
19:00 (UTC+6)	Marochkin 24'; Zhaksylykov 41'	Report	Balashov 33'	Stadium: Central Stadium; Attendance: 2,000; Referee: Denis Tevyashov

16 July 2022	Taraz	4–2	Maktaaral	Taraz
21:00 (UTC+6)	Zhumabek 21'; Gadrani 40'; Kenesbek 61'; Karaman 74'	Report	Kaldybekov 13' (o.g.); Karimov 40'	Stadium: Central Stadium; Attendance: 6,800; Referee: Elvira Nurmustafina

22 July 2022	Taraz	0–0	Aktobe	Taraz
21:00 (UTC+6)		Report		Stadium: Central Stadium; Attendance: 8,700; Referee: Bulat Sariev

24 July 2022	Tobol	1–4	Maktaaral	Kostanay
19:00 (UTC+6)	Ermekbaev 36'	Report	Yudenkov 15'; Ryskul 35'; Karimov 49'; Kenzhebek 88'	Stadium: Central Stadium; Attendance: 0 Referee: Bagdat Abdullaev

30 July 2022	Aktobe	1–1	Taraz	Aktobe
21:00 (UTC+6)	Balashov 45+2'	Report	Kozhamberdy 67'	Stadium: Koblandy Batyr Stadium; Attendance: 12,861; Referee: Grigoriy Moskovchenko

31 July 2022	Maktaaral	1–0	Tobol	Turkistan
21:00 (UTC+6)	Karimov 53'	Report		Stadium: Turkistan Arena; Attendance: 0 Referee: Sergey Gorokhovodatskiy

6 August 2022	Aktobe	1–0	Maktaaral	Aktobe
21:00 (UTC+6)	Yerlanov 86'	Report		Stadium: Koblandy Batyr Stadium; Attendance: 10,211; Referee: Sergey Nozhenko

7 August 2022	Tobol	3–5	Taraz	Kostanay
21:00 (UTC+6)	Sergeyev 9', 18'; Zhaksylykov 53'	Report	Zhumabek 23', 61', 82', 88'; Shakhmetov 34'	Stadium: Central Stadium; Attendance: 1,200; Referee: Aleksandr Zatula

13 August 2022	Maktaaral	1–1	Taraz	Turkistan
19:00 (UTC+6)	Kenzhebek 57'	Report	Kenesbek 74'	Stadium: Turkistan Arena; Attendance: 2,000; Referee: Aleksandr Gauzer

14 August 2022	Aktobe	1–0	Tobol	Aktobe
21:00 (UTC+6)	Kulpeisov 27' (o.g.)	Report		Stadium: Koblandy Batyr Stadium; Attendance: 11,000; Referee: Aydyn Tasybaev

=== Group D ===
Pos	Team	Pld	W	D	L	GF	GA	GD	Pts	Qualification
1	Astana (A)	6	3	3	0	17	7	+10	12	Advanced to Quarterfinals
2	Shakhter (A)	6	3	1	2	13	14	−1	10	Advanced to Quarterfinals
3	Turan	6	1	2	3	5	9	−4	5	
4	Zhetysu	6	0	4	2	4	9	−5	4	

Updated to match(es) played on 14 August 2022. Source: PFLK
(A) Advance to a further round

8 July 2022	Zhetysu	0–0	Astana	Taldykorgan
18:00 (UTC+6)		Report		Stadium: Zhetysu Stadium; Attendance: 1,700; Referee: Danil Gorda

8 July 2022	Shakhter	4–0	Turan	Karaganda
19:00 (UTC+6)	Murtazeyev 16', 30'; Gabyshev 61'; Graf 86'	Report		Stadium: Shakhter Stadium; Attendance: 1,000; Referee: Aleksandr Gauzer

15 July 2022	Astana	5–2	Shakhter	Nur-Sultan
21:00 (UTC+6)	Eugénio 17'; Vloet 42', 44'; Pertsukh 50', 90+2'	Report	Rustemović 36'; Kobzar 88'	Stadium: Astana Arena; Attendance: 3,200; Referee: Daniyar Sakhi

17 July 2022	Turan	3–0	Zhetysu	Turkistan
21:00 (UTC+6)	Fazli 16', 24', 62'	Report		Stadium: Turkistan Arena; Attendance: 1,500; Referee: Anton Kuchma

24 July 2022	Turan	1–1	Astana	Turkistan
18:30 (UTC+6)	Kabylan 47'	Report	Aymbetov 65'	Stadium: Turkistan Arena; Attendance: 0 Referee: Rustam Omarov

24 July 2022	Zhetysu	0–0	Shakhter	Taldykorgan
19:00 (UTC+6)		Report		Stadium: Zhetysu Stadium; Attendance: 0 Referee: Nariman Talapkerov

30 July 2022	Shakhter	4–2	Zhetysu	Karaganda
19:00 (UTC+6)	Zhangylyshbay 24'; Sapanov 42'; Murtazeyev 63'; Sviridov 90'	Report	Nurbol 37'; Amangeldy 54'	Stadium: Shakhter Stadium; Attendance: 2,000; Referee: Denis Tevyashov

31 July 2022	Astana	2–1	Turan	Nur-Sultan
19:00 (UTC+6)	Eugénio 2', 26'	Report	Fazli 58'	Stadium: Astana Arena; Attendance: 0 Referee: Artyom Kuchin

5 August 2022	Turan	0–2	Shakhter	Turkistan
21:00 (UTC+6)		Report	Cañas 16'; Kobzar 85'	Stadium: Turkistan Arena; Attendance: 2,000; Referee: Bulat Sariev

7 August 2022	Astana	2–2	Zhetysu	Nur-Sultan
19:00 (UTC+6)	Manzorro 12', 90+1'	Report	Turysbek 7'; Nurbol 90+5'	Stadium: Astana Arena; Attendance: 1,300; Referee: Elvira Nurmustafina

14 August 2022	Zhetysu	0–0	Turan	Taldykorgan
18:00 (UTC+6)		Report		Stadium: Zhetysu Stadium; Attendance: 2,000; Referee: Sanzhar Iskakov

14 August 2022	Shakhter	1–7	Astana	Karaganda
19:00 (UTC+6)	Flyuk 90'	Report	Kusyapov 9'; Eugénio 50', 59', 65'; Manzorro 76'; Sagnaev 88'; Basmanov 90+4'	Stadium: Shakhter Stadium; Attendance: 4,500; Referee: Sergey Gorokhovodatskiy

== Knockout stage ==
The draw for the quarter-finals and semi-finals was held on 16 August 2022.

=== Quarter-finals ===
31 August 2022	Kairat	1–2	Akzhayik	Almaty
19:00 (UTC+6)	Paulo (yellow card) 9'; S.Keiler (yellow card) 22' (goal) 78'; Shvyryov (yellow card) 42' (yellow-red card) 45+1'; Astanov (yellow card) 59'	Report	B.Omarov (yellow card) 35'; Pryndeta (yellow card) 77'; Vasin 87' (o.g.); Omirtayev 90'	Stadium: Central Stadium; Attendance: 2,300; Referee: Alexander Gauzer

31 August 2022	Taraz	1–1 (a.e.t.) (4 – 2 p)	Shakhter Karagandy	Taraz
19:00 (UTC+6)	A.Zhumabek 68'; M.Amirkhanov (yellow card) 96'	Report	Murtazayev 65'	Stadium: Central Stadium; Attendance: 8,500; Referee: Rustam Omarov
	Penalties
	Shakhmetov (penalty scored); Gadrani (penalty scored); K.Kalmuratov (penalty scored); Junior (penalty scored)		(penalty scored) Gligorov; (penalty scored) Đ.Ćosić; (penalty missed) Cañas; (penalty missed) Bukorac

31 August 2022	Astana	1–0	Maktaaral	Nur-Sultan
21:00 (UTC+6)	Lebon 90'	Report	G.Kenzhebek (yellow card) 13'; Nosko (yellow card) 40'	Stadium: Astana Arena; Attendance: 1,500; Referee: Bayimbet Saken

31 August 2022	Kaisar	1–1 (a.e.t.) (1 – 4 p)	Ordabasy	Kyzylorda
21:00 (UTC+6)	B.Kurmanbekuly (yellow card) 10'; Y.Altynbekov (yellow card) 33'; A.Seitov 75'; A.Tolegenov (yellow card) 87'	Report	Astanov (yellow card) 7'; Sadovsky 56'; O.Abdumajidov (yellow card) 106'	Stadium: Gani Muratbayev Stadium; Attendance: 6,000; Referee: Grigory Moskovchenko
	Penalties
	Y.Altynbekov (penalty scored); R.Sakhalbaev (penalty missed); A.Tolegenov (penalty missed)		(penalty scored) D.Borodin; (penalty scored) Bakhtiyarov; (penalty scored) Batyshchev; (penalty scored) S.Shamshi (penalty scored)

=== Semi-finals ===
19 October 2022	Akzhayik	5–3	Taraz	Oral
(UTC+6)	T.Tabatadze 20'; Avetisyan 38' (yellow card) 68'; Sabino 45'; Gazdanov 78'; Omirtayev 82'; Syamuk (yellow card) 88'	Report	E.Kaldybekov (yellow card) 23'; B.Shadmanov (yellow card) 30'; Z.Zhaksylykov (yellow card) 50'; Shakhmetov 75'; D.Zhumat 86'; M.Amirkhanov 88'; Dehtyarov (yellow card) 88'	Stadium: Petr Atoyan Stadium; Attendance: 1,500; Referee: Rustam Omarov

19 October 2022	Astana	2–3	Ordabasy	Astana
19:00 (UTC+6)	S.Sagnayev (yellow card) 2'; Prokopenko 32' (pen.), 39'; Z.Kalmakhambet (yellow card) 48'	Report	D.Kanatkali 22' (o.g.); B.Shayzada (yellow card) 33'; S.Tursynbay (yellow card) 43'; L.Guedes 65'; Nyuiadzi 90+8'	Stadium: Astana Arena; Attendance: 2,200; Referee: Saken Bayimbet

== Final ==
12 November 2022
15:00 (UTC+6)

Akzhayik	4–5 (a.e.t.)	Ordabasy
Badoyan 7'; T. Tabatadze 11', 68'; Kalenchuk (yellow card) 20'; Sabino (yellow card) 54'; Bilali (yellow card) 64'; Kovalenko 74'; Pryndeta (yellow card) 117'; B. Omarov (yellow card) 118'	Report	S. Shamshi 26'; Sadovsky 51'; S. Tursynbay (yellow card) 61'; Fedin 76'; L. Guedes 90+7'; Batyshchev (yellow card) 94'; Astanov 119' (pen.)

Astana Arena, Astana
Attendance: 3,620
Referee: Artem Kuchin

== Goal scorers ==
As of match played 12 November 2022

8 goals:

- (Georgia (country)) Toma Tabatadze - Akzhayik

6 goals:

- (Portugal) Pedro Eugénio - Astana
- (Kazakhstan) Abylayhan Zhumabek - Taraz

4 goals:

- (Guinea) Mamadou Diallo - Kaisar
- (Kazakhstan) Ramazan Karimov - Maktaaral
- (Brazil) Luiz Guedes - Ordabasy
- (Kazakhstan) Roman Murtazayev - Shakhter Karagandy
- (North Macedonia) Samir Fazli - Turan

3 goals:

- (Ukraine) Vitaliy Balashov - Aktobe
- (Ukraine) Illya Kovalenko - Akzhayik
- (France) Jérémy Manzorro - Astana
- (Belarus) Kiryl Sidarenka - Kaisar
- (Kazakhstan) Galymzhan Kenzhebek - Maktaaral
- (Kazakhstan) Elkhan Astanov - Ordabasy
- (Kazakhstan) Maksim Fedin - Ordabasy
- (Kazakhstan) Marat Shakhmetov - Taraz
- (Kazakhstan) Aybar Zhaksylykov - Tobol
- (Kazakhstan) Nurbergen Nurbol - Zhetysu

2 goals:

- (Kazakhstan) Erkebulan Amangeldy - Akademia Ontustik / Zhetysu
- (Armenia) Zaven Badoyan - Akzhayik
- (Kazakhstan) Oralkhan Omirtayev - Akzhayik
- (Russia) Artur Gazdanov - Akzhayik
- (Kazakhstan) Yury Pertsukh - Astana
- (Kazakhstan) Vladislav Prokopenko - Astana
- (Netherlands) Rai Vloet - Astana
- (Brazil) Matheus Bissi - Atyrau
- (Croatia) Andrija Filipović - Atyrau
- (Croatia) Ivan Pešić - Caspiy
- (Kazakhstan) Yerkebulan Nurgaliyev - Caspiy
- (Brazil) João Paulo - Kairat
- (Kazakhstan) Sergey Keiler - Kairat
- (Kazakhstan) Artur Shushenachev - Kairat
- (Kazakhstan) Vyacheslav Shvyryov - Kairat
- (Kyrgyzstan) Gulzhigit Alykulov - Kairat
- (Russia) Adilet Sadybekov - Kairat
- (Kazakhstan) Orken Makhan - Kaisar
- (Kazakhstan) Ruslan Sakhalbaev - Kaisar
- (Belarus) Vsevolod Sadovsky - Ordabasy
- (Togo) Serge Nyuiadzi - Ordabasy
- (Russia) Yevgeni Kobzar - Shakhter Karagandy
- (Georgia (country)) Luka Gadrani - Taraz
- (Kazakhstan) Dinmukhamed Karaman - Taraz
- (Kazakhstan) Adilet Kenesbek - Taraz
- (Uzbekistan) Igor Sergeyev - Tobol
- (Kazakhstan) Torekul - Zhas Sunkar
- (Kazakhstan) Aleksey Mikhaylov - Zhetysu

1 goals:

- (Kazakhstan) Daniyar Abilov - Akademia Ontustik
- (Kazakhstan) Vadim Afanasenko - Akademia Ontustik
- (Kazakhstan) Kudayberdy Narkulov - Akademia Ontustik
- (Kazakhstan) Rinat Serikkul - Akademia Ontustik
- (Kazakhstan) Arman Kenesov - Aktobe
- (Kazakhstan) Temirlan Yerlanov - Aktobe
- (Kazakhstan) Sergey Lisenkov - Aktobe City
- (Kazakhstan) Damir Marat - Aksu
- (Kazakhstan) Arman Smailov - Aksu
- (Kazakhstan) Miras Turlybek - Aksu
- (Armenia) Petros Avetisyan - Akzhayik
- (Brazil) Rafael Sabino - Akzhayik
- (Kazakhstan) Didar Esengeldy - Arys
- (France) Keelan Lebon - Astana
- (Kazakhstan) Abat Aymbetov - Astana
- (Kazakhstan) Stanislav Basmanov - Astana
- (Kazakhstan) Talgat Kusyapov - Astana
- (Kazakhstan) Sultan Sagnayev - Astana
- (Bosnia and Herzegovina) Todor Petrović - Atyrau
- (Poland) Piotr Grzelczak - Atyrau
- (Kazakhstan) Baryskhan Isakhozhaev - Baikonur
- (Brazil) Ruan Teles - Caspiy
- (France) Chafik Tigroudja - Caspiy
- (Kazakhstan) Darkhan Berdibek - Caspiy
- (Kazakhstan) Duman Narzildayev - Caspiy
- (Russia) Pavel Kireyenko - Caspiy
- (Ukraine) Artem Baranovskyi - Caspiy
- (Kazakhstan) Ruslan Ordabek - Igilik
- (Kazakhstan) Yerkebulan Seydakhmet - Kairat
- (Kazakhstan) Andrey Ulshin - Kairat
- (Kazakhstan) Daniyar Usenov - Kairat
- (Russia) Viktor Vasin - Kairat
- (Brazil) João Pedro - Kaisar
- (Kazakhstan) Elzhas Altynbekov - Kaisar
- (Kazakhstan) Nurbol Anuarbekov - Kaisar
- (Kazakhstan) Elisey Gorshunov - Kaisar
- (Kazakhstan) Bekzat Kurmanbekuly - Kaisar
- (Kazakhstan) Amal Seitov - Kaisar
- (Georgia (country)) Elguja Lobjanidze - Kyzylzhar
- (Russia) Maksim Chikanchi - Kyzylzhar
- (Russia) Pavel Yakovlev - Kyzylzhar
- (Brazil) Alex Bruno - Maktaaral
- (Kazakhstan) Beknur Ryskul - Maktaaral
- (Kazakhstan) Ruslan Yudenkov - Maktaaral
- (Kazakhstan) Murojon Khalmatov - Ordabasy
- (Kazakhstan) Samat Shamshi - Ordabasy
- (Kazakhstan) Karam Sultanov - Ordabasy
- (Kazakhstan) Batyrbek Zhanabaev - SD Family Nur-Sultan
- (Bosnia and Herzegovina) Edin Rustemović - Shakhter Karagandy
- (Colombia) Roger Cañas - Shakhter Karagandy
- (Croatia) Ivan Graf - Shakhter Karagandy
- (Kazakhstan) Shyngys Flyuk - Shakhter Karagandy
- (Kazakhstan) Mikhail Gabyshev - Shakhter Karagandy
- (Kazakhstan) Miram Sapanov - Shakhter Karagandy
- (Kazakhstan) Ivan Sviridov - Shakhter Karagandy
- (Kazakhstan) Toktar Zhangylyshbay - Shakhter Karagandy
- (Haiti) Alex Junior - Taraz
- (Kazakhstan) Maksat Amirkhanov - Taraz
- (Kazakhstan) Bauyrzhan Baytana - Taraz
- (Kazakhstan) Zhakyp Kozhamberdy - Taraz
- (Kazakhstan) Yermek Kuantayev - Taraz
- (Kazakhstan) Dauren Zhumat - Taraz
- (Kazakhstan) Bekzat Ermekbaev - Tobol
- (Kazakhstan) Aleksandr Marochkin - Tobol
- (Kazakhstan) Bekzat Kabylan - Turan
- (Kazakhstan) Zhenis Abuov - Yassi
- (Kazakhstan) Kanat Ashirbay - Yassi
- (Kazakhstan) Abylay Zhaysanbek - Zhas Kyran
- (Kazakhstan) Adilzhan Nurbay - Zhas Sunkar
- (Kazakhstan) Altynbek Tuleev - Zhas Sunkar
- (Kazakhstan) Sanzhar Batyrkhanov - Zhenis
- (Kazakhstan) Artem Cheredinov - Zhenis
- (Kazakhstan) Arsen Elemesov - Zhenis
- (Kazakhstan) Nurzhan Kuanyshkaliev - Zhenis
- (Kazakhstan) Karim Smykov - Zhenis
- (Kazakhstan) Alikhan Uteshev - Zhenis
- (Kazakhstan) Ravil Atykhanov - Zhetysu
- (Kazakhstan) Bauyrzhan Turysbek - Zhetysu
- (Russia) Aslanbek Sikoyev - Zhetysu

Own goal

- (Kazakhstan) Aydos Mamirbaev - Arys vs Aktobe City 6 April 2022
- (Kazakhstan) Erlan Akyltayuly - Altai vs Zhetysu 6 April 2022
- (Kazakhstan) Ersultan Kaldybekov - Taraz vs Maktaaral 16 July 2022
- (Kazakhstan) Alisher Suley - Caspiy vs Kyzylzhar 7 August 2022
- (Kazakhstan) Vyacheslav Kulpeisov - Tobol vs Aktobe 14 August 2022
- (Russia) Viktor Vasin - Kairat vs Akzhayik 31 August 2022
- (Kazakhstan) Dias Kanatkali - Astana vs Ordabasy 19 October 2022
