= Yevhen Chahovets =

Ukrainian footballer

Personal information
- Full name: Yevhen Vyacheslavovych Chahovets
- Date of birth: 24 March 1998 (age 28)
- Place of birth: Andriivka, Ukraine
- Height: 1.90 m (6 ft 3 in)
- Position: Defender

Team information
- Current team: Torpedo-BelAZ Zhodino
- Number: 3

Youth career
- 2011–2015: UFK-Metal Kharkiv

Senior career*
Years	Team	Apps	(Gls)
2015–2019	Shakhtar Donetsk	0	(0)
2019–2021	Minsk	62	(4)
2022	Rukh Brest	0	(0)
2022	Ordabasy	5	(0)
2023	Riteriai	8	(0)
2024	Dinamo Batumi	4	(0)
2024–2025	Gomel	42	(2)
2026–	Torpedo-BelAZ Zhodino	9	(0)
- * Club domestic league appearances and goals as of 3 July 2026

Yevhen Vyacheslavovych Chahovets (Ukrainian: Євгеній В'ячеславович Чаговець; born 24 March 1998) is a Ukrainian professional footballer who plays for Torpedo-BelAZ Zhodino.

== Club career ==
In August 2023 he signed with Lithuanian club Riteriai.

On 2 August he made debut in A Lyga match against FK Panevėžys.

On 16 November 2023 was announced, that player left Riteriai Club.

In February 2024, Chahovets moved to Georgian reigning champions Dinamo Batumi.
