= Artsyom Rakhmanaw =

Belarusian footballer

Personal information
- Full name: Artsyom Uladzimiravich Rakhmanaw
- Date of birth: 10 July 1990 (age 36)
- Place of birth: Minsk, Belarusian SSR, Soviet Union
- Height: 1.95 m (6 ft 5 in)
- Position: Centre-back

Team information
- Current team: BATE Borisov
- Number: 33

Youth career
- 2007–2008: Minsk

Senior career*
Years	Team	Apps	(Gls)
2007–2008	Minsk-2	27	(4)
2008–2012	Minsk	50	(0)
2013	Slavia Mozyr	31	(0)
2014	Neman Grodno	12	(0)
2015	Levadia Tallinn	31	(5)
2016–2017	Milsami Orhei	27	(4)
2017	Chornomorets Odesa	7	(0)
2018	Raków Częstochowa	12	(1)
2018	Isloch Minsk Raion	12	(0)
2019	AFC Eskilstuna	5	(1)
2019	Isloch Minsk Raion	11	(0)
2020–2021	Rukh Brest	48	(4)
2022	Astana	13	(0)
2024–2025	Dinamo Brest	38	(2)
2025–	BATE Borisov	20	(0)

International career
2009–2012	Belarus U21	14	(1)
2021	Belarus	2	(0)
- * Club domestic league appearances and goals as of 6 July 2026

Artsyom Uladzimiravich Rakhmanaw (Belarusian: Арцём Уладзiмiравiч Рахманаў; Russian: Артём Владимирович Рахманов; born 10 July 1990) is a Belarusian professional footballer who plays as a centre-back for BATE Borisov.

== Club career ==
Born in Minsk, Rakhmanaw began playing football in FC Minsk's youth system. He joined the senior team and made his Belarusian Premier League debut in 2009.

On 14 January 2022, Rakhmanaw signed for Astana on a contract until the end of 2023. On 9 January 2023, Rakhmanaw left Astana after his contract was terminated by mutual agreement.

== International career ==
He made his debut for the Belarus national football team on 2 September 2021 in a World Cup qualifier against the Czech Republic, a 0–1 away loss. He started and played the whole game.

== Honours ==
Minsk

- Belarusian Cup: 2012–13

Astana

- Kazakhstan Premier League: 2022
