= Vsevolod Sadovsky =

Belarusian footballer

Personal information
- Date of birth: 4 October 1996 (age 30)
- Place of birth: Minsk, Belarus
- Height: 1.93 m (6 ft 4 in)
- Position: Forward

Team information
- Current team: Okzhetpes
- Number: 90

Youth career
- Dinamo Minsk
- MTZ-RIPO Minsk
- BATE Borisov
- 2014–2015: Minsk

Senior career*
Years	Team	Apps	(Gls)
2016–2019	Energetik-BGU Minsk	81	(37)
2019–2020	Dinamo Brest	9	(0)
2019	→ Energetik-BGU Minsk (loan)	6	(3)
2020–2021	Rukh Brest	33	(13)
2022–2024	Ordabasy	60	(9)
2025	Kotwica Kołobrzeg	11	(0)
2025	Jenis	6	(4)
2026–	Okzhetpes	9	(1)

International career
2016	Belarus U21	1	(0)
- * Club domestic league appearances and goals as of 2 November 2026

Vsevolod Sadovsky (Belarusian: Усевалад Садоўскі; Russian: Всеволод Садовский; born 4 October 1996) is a Belarusian professional footballer who plays as a forward for Kazakhstan Premier League club Okzhetpes.

== Career statistics ==
As of match played 1 November 2026

Appearances and goals by club, season and competition
Club	Season	League			National cup (Note: Includes Belarusian Cup, Kazakhstan Cup)		Europe		Other		Total	
Club	Season	Division	Apps	Goals	Apps	Goals	Apps	Goals	Apps	Goals	Apps	Goals
Energetik-BGU Minsk	2016	Belarusian First League	12	3	1	0	—		—		13	3
Energetik-BGU Minsk	2017	Belarusian First League	29	7	0	0	—		—		29	7
Energetik-BGU Minsk	2018	Belarusian First League	24	21	1	0	—		—		25	21
Energetik-BGU Minsk	2019	Belarusian Premier League	22	9	1	1	—		—		23	10
Energetik-BGU Minsk	Total		87	40	3	1	—		—		90	41
Dinamo Brest	2019	Belarusian Premier League	0	0	2	0	—		—		2	0
Dinamo Brest	2020	Belarusian Premier League	9	0	0	0	—		0	0	9	0
Dinamo Brest	Total		9	0	2	0	—		0	0	11	0
Rukh Brest	2020	Belarusian Premier League	9	9	2	0	—		—		11	9
Rukh Brest	2021	Belarusian Premier League	24	4	1	0	—		—		25	4
Rukh Brest	Total		33	13	3	0	—		—		36	13
Ordabasy	2022	Kazakhstan Premier League	20	4	9	2	—		—		29	6
Ordabasy	2023	Kazakhstan Premier League	19	4	6	3	2	2	1 (Note: Appearance in Kazakhstan Super Cup)	0	28	9
Ordabasy	2024	Kazakhstan Premier League	21	1	1	0	4	1	2 (Note: One appearance in Kazakhstan League Cup, one appearance in Kazakhstan Super Cup)	0	28	2
Ordabasy	Total		60	9	16	5	6	3	3	0	85	17
Kotwica Kołobrzeg	2024–25	I liga	11	0	—		—		—		11	0
Jenis	2025	Kazakhstan Premier League	6	4	2	0	—		—		8	4
Okzhetpes	2026	Kazakhstan Premier League	9	1	0	0	—		—		9	1
Career total			215	67	26	6	6	3	3	0	258	76

== Honours ==
Dinamo Brest

- Belarusian Super Cup: 2020

Ordabasy

- Kazakhstan Premier League: 2023
- Kazakhstan Cup: 2022
