= Nikita Shershnyov =

Russian footballer

Personal information
- Full name: Nikita Vladimirovich Shershnyov
- Date of birth: 19 October 2001 (age 25)
- Place of birth: Taganrog, Russia
- Height: 1.74 m (5 ft 9 in)
- Position: Forward

Youth career
- 2018–2019: FC Krasnodar

Senior career*
Years	Team	Apps	(Gls)
2018–2021	FC Krasnodar-3	11	(0)
2019–2021	FC Krasnodar-2	6	(0)
2021	FC Mashuk-KMV Pyatigorsk	1	(0)
2022–2023	FC Ordabasy	13	(0)
2023	FC Turan	18	(2)

International career^{‡}
2018	Russia U-18	3	(0)
- * Club domestic league appearances and goals as of 31 October 2023 ‡ National team caps and goals as of 16 October 2018

Nikita Vladimirovich Shershnyov (Russian: Никита Владимирович Шершнёв; born 19 October 2001) is a Russian football player.

== Club career ==
He made his debut in the Russian Professional Football League for FC Krasnodar-3 on 27 August 2018 in a game against PFC Spartak Nalchik. He made his Russian Football National League debut for FC Krasnodar-2 on 19 October 2019 in a game against FC Mordovia Saransk.
