= Vitaliy Pryndeta =

Ukrainian footballer

Personal information
- Full name: Vitaliy Valeriyovych Pryndeta
- Date of birth: 2 February 1993 (age 33)
- Place of birth: Dubno, Ukraine
- Height: 1.96 m (6 ft 5 in)
- Position: Center-back

Team information
- Current team: Alga Bishkek
- Number: 4

Youth career
- 2006–2008: BRW-VIK Volodymyr-Volynskyi

Senior career*
Years	Team	Apps	(Gls)
2008–2015	Volyn Lutsk	42	(1)
2016–2018	Platanias	21	(1)
2018	Lamia	3	(0)
2018–2019	SKA-Khabarovsk	19	(3)
2019	Desna Chernihiv	1	(0)
2020–2021	Volyn Lutsk	31	(1)
2021–2023	Akzhayik	27	(1)
2023–2024	Kaisar	46	(5)
2025–	Alga Bishkek	3	(0)

International career^{‡}
2008–2009	Ukraine U16	8	(1)
2008–2010	Ukraine U17	13	(0)
2010–2011	Ukraine U18	4	(0)
2011–2012	Ukraine U19	14	(0)
2012	Ukraine U20	1	(0)
2013–2014	Ukraine U21	19	(1)
- * Club domestic league appearances and goals as of 12 May 2025 ‡ National team caps and goals as of 6 September 2021

Vitaliy Valeriyovych Pryndeta (Ukrainian: Віталій Валерійович Приндета; born 2 February 1993) is a Ukrainian professional footballer who plays as a midfielder for Kyrgyz club Alga Bishkek.

== Career ==
Pryndeta began his playing career with FC BRV-VIK Volodymyr-Volynskyi youth team. Than in age 15 he joined FC Volyn Lutsk in the Ukrainian First League. He made his first team debut entering as a second-half substitute against PFC Sevastopol on 17 August 2008.

=== Desna Chernihiv ===
In summer 2019 he signed for Desna Chernihiv.

== Honours ==
Akzhayik

- Kazakhstan Cup: runner-up: 2022

Ukraine U21

- Commonwealth of Independent States Cup: 2014
