= Artur Gazdanov =

Russian footballer

Personal information
- Full name: Artur Soslanovich Gazdanov
- Date of birth: 26 July 1992 (age 34)
- Place of birth: Vladikavkaz, Russia
- Height: 1.80 m (5 ft 11 in)
- Position: Midfielder

Youth career
- PFC CSKA Moscow

Senior career*
Years	Team	Apps	(Gls)
2010	FC Alania Vladikavkaz	0	(0)
2011–2013	FC Alania-d Vladikavkaz	62	(7)
2013–2014	FC Volgar Astrakhan	7	(1)
2014–2016	FC KAMAZ Naberezhnye Chelny	47	(4)
2016–2017	FC Avangard Kursk	30	(5)
2018–2019	FC KAMAZ Naberezhnye Chelny	31	(4)
2019–2020	FC Tyumen	15	(2)
2020–2021	FC Akron Tolyatti	48	(6)
2022–2023	FC Akzhayik	22	(1)
- * Club domestic league appearances and goals

Artur Soslanovich Gazdanov (Russian: Артур Сосланович Газданов; born 26 July 1992) is a Russian former professional footballer who played as a midfielder.

== Club career ==
He made his debut in the Russian Second Division for FC Alania-d Vladikavkaz on 26 April 2011 in a game against FC Mashuk-KMV Pyatigorsk and scored a goal on his debut.

He made his Russian Football National League debut for FC KAMAZ Naberezhnye Chelny on 11 July 2015 in a game against FC Gazovik Orenburg.
