= Amir Bilali =

Albanian professional footballer

Personal information
- Date of birth: 15 May 1994 (age 32)
- Place of birth: Gostivar, Macedonia
- Height: 1.87 m (6 ft 2 in)
- Position: Centre back

Team information
- Current team: Chindia Târgoviște
- Number: 44

Youth career
- 2008–2014: Cremonese
- 2012–2013: → Lazio (loan)

Senior career*
Years	Team	Apps	(Gls)
2014–2016	Celje	13	(0)
2016–2017	Bylis	35	(2)
2017–2018	Rabotnički	15	(0)
2018	Teuta	17	(1)
2018–2019	Shkupi	33	(1)
2019–2020	Partizani	2	(0)
2020–2022	Academica Clinceni	31	(1)
2022	Mezőkövesd	7	(0)
2022–2023	Akzhayik	8	(0)
2023	Sutjeska Nikšić	13	(1)
2023–2024	Gostivari	22	(0)
2024–2025	Sabail	13	(1)
2025–	Chindia Târgoviște	23	(0)

International career
2012	Albania U19 (Note: Official UEFA matches only.)	3	(0)
- * Club domestic league appearances and goals as of 10 October 2026

Amir Bilali (born 15 April 1994) is a professional footballer who plays as a centre back for Liga II club Chindia Târgoviște. Born in Macedonia, he represented Albania at youth level.

== Honours ==
Celje

- Slovenian Cup runner-up: 2014–15

Akzhayik

- Kazakhstan Cup runner-up: 2022

Sutjeska Nikšić

- Montenegrin Cup: 2022–23
