= Kiryl Sidarenka =

Belarusian footballer

Personal information
- Date of birth: 28 August 1995 (age 31)
- Place of birth: Mogilev, Belarus
- Height: 1.81 m (5 ft 11 1/2 in)
- Position: Forward

Team information
- Current team: Bumprom Gomel
- Number: 9

Youth career
- 2011–2013: PMC Postavy
- 2013–2014: Amkar Perm

Senior career*
Years	Team	Apps	(Gls)
2013–2014	Amkar Perm	0	(0)
2014	→ Vitebsk (loan)	12	(0)
2015	Khimik Svetlogorsk	29	(11)
2016	Vitebsk	12	(0)
2016	→ Smolevichi-STI (loan)	11	(2)
2017–2018	Lokomotiv Gomel	39	(15)
2018	Belshina Bobruisk	13	(5)
2019	Isloch Minsk Raion	0	(0)
2019	→ Belshina Bobruisk (loan)	27	(4)
2020–2021	Dnepr Mogilev	41	(59)
2022	Kyzylzhar	1	(0)
2022	Kaisar	23	(9)
2023	Dinamo Brest	11	(1)
2023	Slavia Mozyr	13	(4)
2024	Muras United		
2024	Slavia Mozyr	11	(1)
2025	Dynamo Bryansk	24	(4)
2026–	Bumprom Gomel	14	(8)

International career^{‡}
2013	Belarus U19		
2015–2016	Belarus U21	3	(0)
- * Club domestic league appearances and goals as of 6 July 2026 ‡ National team caps and goals as of 7 September 2016

Kiryl Sidarenka (Belarusian: Кірыл Сідарэнка; Russian: Кирилл Сидоренко; born 28 August 1995) is a Belarusian professional footballer who plays for Bumprom Gomel.

== Career ==
=== Club ===
In March 2022, Sidarenka joined Kazakhstan First League club Kaisar having previously appeared once for Kyzylzhar in the Kazakhstan Premier League.
