= Dzmitry Baradzin =

Belarusian professional footballer

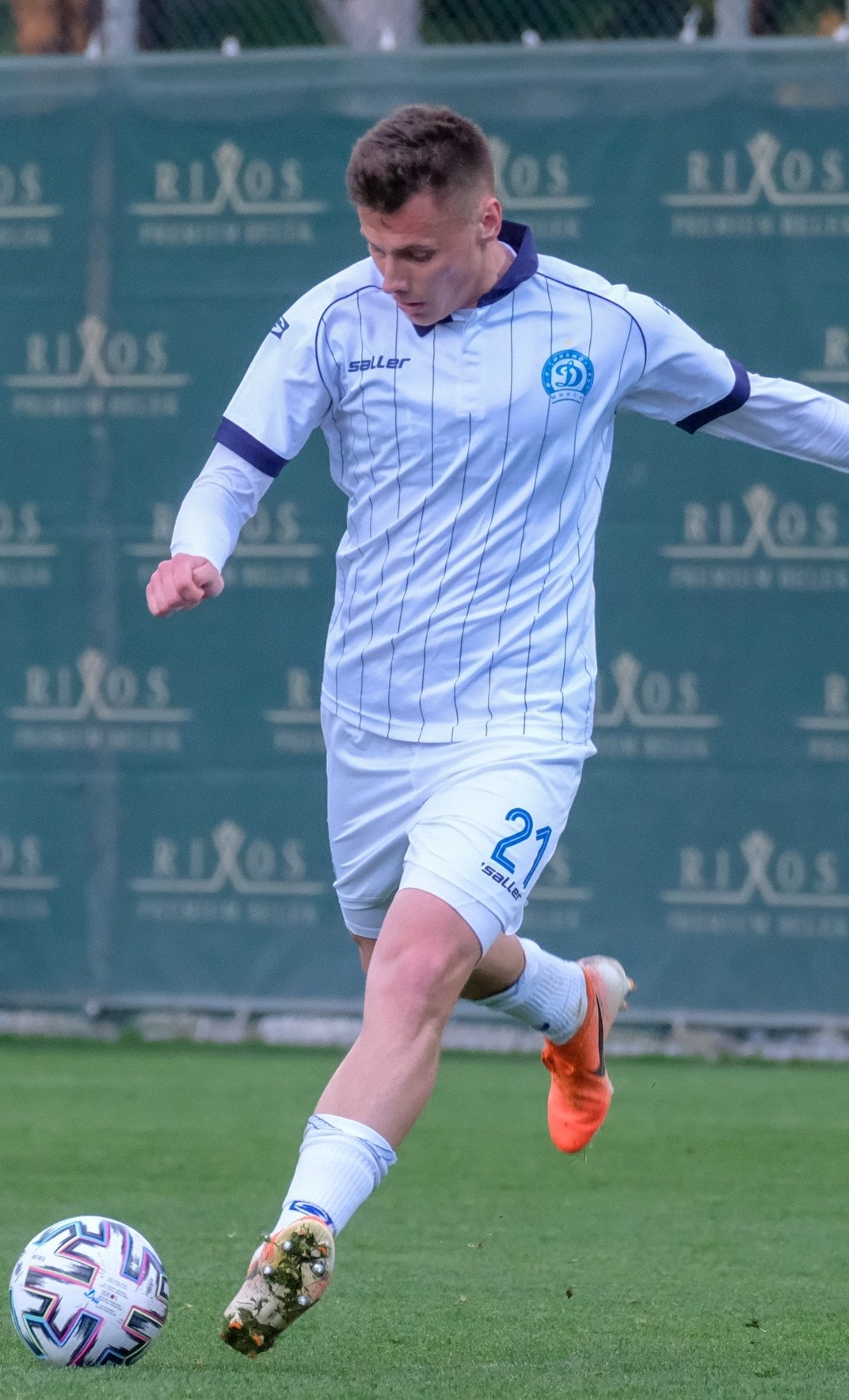
- Baradzin in 2020

Personal information
- Date of birth: 19 July 1999 (age 27)
- Place of birth: Gomel, Belarus
- Height: 1.77 m (5 ft 10 in)
- Position: Midfielder

Team information
- Current team: Okzhetpes
- Number: 9

Youth career
- 2015–2016: Gomel

Senior career*
Years	Team	Apps	(Gls)
2016–2018	Gomel	6	(0)
2018	→ Orsha (loan)	14	(3)
2018–2019	Smolevichi	34	(2)
2020–2022	Dinamo Minsk	8	(0)
2020	→ Isloch Minsk Raion (loan)	6	(0)
2021	→ Chayka Peschanokopskoye (loan)	9	(0)
2021	→ Gomel (loan)	11	(0)
2022	Ordabasy	11	(3)
2023–2024	Kaisar	42	(9)
2025	Gomel	15	(1)
2025	Torpedo-BelAZ Zhodino	12	(2)
2026–	Okzhetpes	28	(5)

International career^{‡}
2015	Belarus U17	2	(0)
2018–2020	Belarus U21	8	(0)
- * Club domestic league appearances and goals as of 1 November 2026 ‡ National team caps and goals as of 15 November 2020

Dzmitry Baradzin (Belarusian: Дзмітрый Барадзін; Russian: Дмитрий Бородин; born 19 July 1999) is a Belarusian professional footballer who plays for Okzhetpes as a midfielder.

== Honours ==
Gomel

- Belarusian Cup: 2021–22

Ordabasy

- Kazakhstan Cup: 2022
