= Oleksandr Batishchev =

Ukrainian footballer

Personal information
- Full name: Oleksandr Volodymyrovych Batishchev
- Date of birth: 14 September 1991 (age 35)
- Place of birth: Rubizhne, Ukraine
- Height: 1.74 m (5 ft 9 in)
- Position: Midfielder

Team information
- Current team: Slavia Mozyr
- Number: 9

Youth career
- 2004–2007: Stal Alchevsk
- 2007: LVUFK Luhansk

Senior career*
Years	Team	Apps	(Gls)
2009–2014	Zorya Luhansk	3	(0)
2010–2011	→ Shakhtar Donetsk (loan)	0	(0)
2013	→ Sumy (loan)	7	(0)
2013–2014	→ Stal Alchevsk (loan)	23	(0)
2014–2015	Belshina Bobruisk	39	(0)
2016–2017	Krumkachy Minsk	40	(5)
2017–2018	Gomel	45	(1)
2019	Torpedo Minsk	13	(0)
2019	Dnyapro Mogilev	13	(0)
2020–2021	Gomel	52	(0)
2022	Ordabasy	19	(1)
2023	Torpedo-BelAZ Zhodino	18	(1)
2024–2025	Slavia Mozyr	47	(1)
2026	Torpedo-BelAZ Zhodino	0	(0)
2026–	Slavia Mozyr	6	(0)
- * Club domestic league appearances and goals as of 4 September 2026

Oleksandr Volodymyrovych Batishchev (Ukrainian: Олександр Володимирович Батіщев; born 14 September 1991) is a Ukrainian professional footballer who plays as a midfielder for Slavia Mozyr.

== Career ==
Batishchev is the product of the FC Stal Alchevsk sporting system.

== Honours ==
Ordabasy

- Kazakhstan Cup: 2022
