= Nikolai Tarasov (footballer) =

Russian footballer

Personal information
- Full name: Nikolai Sergeyevich Tarasov
- Date of birth: 25 February 1998 (age 28)
- Place of birth: Otradnoye, Russia
- Height: 1.87 m (6 ft 1 1/2 in)
- Position: Defender

Team information
- Current team: Spartak Kostroma
- Number: 2

Youth career
- –2012: Izhorets Kolpino
- 2012–2016: Zenit St.Petersburg
- 2016–2017: Amkar Perm

Senior career*
Years	Team	Apps	(Gls)
2017–2018	Dynamo-2 St.Petersburg	24	(3)
2018–2019	Torpedo Vladimir	21	(2)
2019–2021	Olimp-Dolgoprudny	21	(4)
2020	→ Zenit-2 St.Petersburg (loan)	12	(0)
2021	Veles Moscow	14	(1)
2022	Atyrau	20	(3)
2023–2024	Qizilqum Zarafshon	27	(0)
2025	Bnei Yehuda	17	(2)
2025–	Spartak Kostroma	30	(3)

International career^{‡}
2014–2015	Russia U-17	6	(0)
- * Club domestic league appearances and goals as of 16 May 2026 ‡ National team caps and goals as of 7 January 2015

Nikolai Sergeyevich Tarasov (Russian: Николай Сергеевич Тарасов; born 25 February 1998) is a Russian football player who plays for Spartak Kostroma.

== Club career ==
He made his debut in the Russian Football National League for FC Veles Moscow on 10 July 2021 in a game against FC Yenisey Krasnoyarsk.

== Career statistics ==
As of match played 16 May 2026

Appearances and goals by club, season and competition
Club	Season	League			National cup		Other		Total	
Club	Season	Division	Apps	Goals	Apps	Goals	Apps	Goals	Apps	Goals
Dynamo-2 St.Petersburg	2017–18	Russian Second League	24	3	0	0	—		24	3
Torpedo Vladimir	2018–19	Russian Second League	21	2	1	0	—		22	2
Olimp-Dolgoprudny	2019–20	Russian Second League	14	3	1	0	—		15	3
Olimp-Dolgoprudny	2020–21	Russian Second League	7	1	—		—		7	1
Olimp-Dolgoprudny	Total		21	4	1	0	—		22	4
Dynamo-2 St.Petersburg (loan)	2020–21	Russian Second League	12	0	—		—		12	0
Veles Moscow	2021–22	Russian First League	14	1	3	0	—		17	1
Atyrau	2022	Kazakhstan Premier League	20	3	3	0	—		23	3
Qizilqum	2023	Uzbekistan Super League	22	0	1	0	1 (Note: Appearance in relegation play-offs)	0	24	0
Qizilqum	2024	Uzbekistan Super League	25	0	3	1	0	0	28	1
Qizilqum	Total		47	0	4	1	1	0	52	5
Bnei Yehuda	2024–25	Israeli Premier League	16	2	0	0	—		16	2
Spartak Kostroma	2025–26	Russian First League	30	3	0	0	—		30	3
Career total			205	18	12	1	1	0	218	19
