= Mikhail Gabyshev =

Kazakhstani footballer (born 1990)

Personal information
- Full name: Mikhail Vyacheslavovich Gabyshev
- Date of birth: 2 January 1990 (age 36)
- Place of birth: Oskemen, Kazakh SSR, Soviet Union
- Height: 1.85 m (6 ft 1 in)
- Position: Defender

Team information
- Current team: Shakhter Karagandy

Youth career
- Vostok

Senior career*
Years	Team	Apps	(Gls)
2009–2011	Vostok	35	(2)
2012–2018	Shakhter Karagandy	112	(6)
2019	Caspiy	8	(0)
2019–2020	Atyrau	9	(0)
2020–2021	Caspiy	15	(0)
2021–2022	Shakhter Karagandy	31	(1)
2022–2024	Astana	11	(1)
2024	Yelimay	12	(0)
2025	Shakhter Karagandy	0	(0)
2025 -	FC Turan	0	(0)

International career^{‡}
2012	Kazakhstan U21	2	(0)
2021–	Kazakhstan	4	(1)
- * Club domestic league appearances and goals as of 11 September 2025 @ 13:49(AEST) ‡ National team caps and goals as of 22 September 2022

Mikhail Vyacheslavovich Gabyshev (Russian: Михаил Вячеславович Габышев; born 2 January 1990) is a Kazakhstani football player who plays for Shakhter Karagandy.

== Career ==
=== Club ===
On 15 July 2022, Astana announced the signing of Gabyshev from Shakhter Karagandy.

=== International ===
Gabyshev made his debut for Kazakhstan national football team on 4 June 2021 in a friendly against North Macedonia. He substituted Yerkin Tapalov in the 83rd minute.

Kazakhstan
Year	Apps	Goals
2021	1	0
2022	3	1
Total	4	1

==== International goals ====
Scores and results list Kazakhstan's goal tally first.

No.	Date	Venue	Opponent	Score	Result	Competition
1.	22 September 2022	Astana Arena, Astana, Kazakhstan	Belarus	1–0	2–1	2022–23 UEFA Nations League C
