= Ruan Teles =

Brazilian footballer

Personal information
- Full name: Ruan Ribeiro Teles
- Date of birth: 23 October 1997 (age 29)
- Place of birth: Brazil
- Height: 1.72 m (5 ft 8 in)
- Position: Forward

Youth career
- 2014–2015: Atlético Mineiro
- 2015–2016: Cruzeiro
- 2016–2017: Juventus SC

Senior career*
Years	Team	Apps	(Gls)
2017	Tupi	8	(1)
2017–2019	Varzim	40	(2)
2019–2021	Marítimo	1	(0)
2019–2021	Marítimo B	8	(2)
2020	→ Villa Nova (loan)	5	(0)
2021	Argeș Pitești	19	(0)
2022	Caspiy	23	(7)
2023	Newroz		
2023–2024	Alagoinhas	9	(1)
2024	Patrocinense	0	(0)
2024	Jacuipense	10	(0)
2024–2025	Al-Kahrabaa	20	(0)
- * Club domestic league appearances and goals as of 18 May 2025

Ruan Ribeiro Teles (born 23 October 1997) is a Brazilian professional footballer who plays as a forward.

== Career ==
Ruan made his professional debut for Varzim in a 1–0 LigaPro win over Real S.C. on 3 December 2017. On 10 January 2019, he transferred to C.S. Marítimo.
