= Karam Sultanov =

Kazakhstani footballer (born 1996)

Personal information
- Full name: Karam Badirkhanovich Sultanov
- Date of birth: 15 April 1996 (age 30)
- Place of birth: Shymkent, Kazakhstan
- Height: 1.90 m (6 ft 3 in)
- Position: Centre-back

Team information
- Current team: Turan
- Number: 4

Youth career
- 2013–2016: Ordabasy
- 2014: Bayterek

Senior career*
Years	Team	Apps	(Gls)
2017–2019	Kyzylzhar	24	(0)
2020	Caspiy	0	(0)
2020–2021	Sumgayit	7	(0)
2021	Shakhter Karagandy	11	(0)
2021–2022	Ordabasy	28	(5)
2023–2024	Turan	8	(1)
2024	Ekibastuz	23	(4)
2025	Kaisar	23	(2)
2026–	Turan	24	(2)

International career
2014	Kazakhstan U19	3	(0)
2017–2018	Kazakhstan U21	2	(0)
- * Club domestic league appearances and goals as of 2 November 2026

Karam Badirkhanovich Sultanov (Russian: Карам Бадирханович Султанов; Azerbaijani: Kərəm Bədirxan oğlu Sultanov; born 15 April 1996) is a Kazakhstani professional footballer who plays as a defender for Turan.

== Career ==
Sultanov made his Kazakhstan Premier League debut for Kyzylzhar in a 1–0 home victory against Zhetysu on 14 April 2018.

On 15 August 2020, he signed a 1+1 year contract with Azerbaijan Premier League club Sumgayit FK. On 18 January 2021, Sultanov left Sumgayit by mutual consent.
