= Samir Fazli =

Macedonian footballer

Personal information
- Date of birth: 22 April 1991 (age 35)
- Place of birth: Skopje, SR Macedonia, SFR Yugoslavia
- Height: 1.85 m (6 ft 1 in)
- Position: Striker

Team information
- Current team: Makedonija Gjorče Petrov
- Number: 18

Youth career
- 2007–2008: Makedonija

Senior career*
Years	Team	Apps	(Gls)
2007–2009	Makedonija	47	(13)
2009–2014	Heerenveen	26	(1)
2013	→ Helmond Sport (loan)	15	(5)
2014–2017	FC Wil	68	(18)
2017–2018	Rudeš	18	(5)
2018–2020	Shkëndija	30	(3)
2021	Makedonija Gjorče Petrov	10	(4)
2021	Turan	5	(1)
2022	Makedonija Gjorče Petrov	1	(0)
2022	Turan	22	(1)
2023–	Makedonija Gjorče Petrov	39	(5)

International career^{‡}
2009–2012	Macedonia U-21	22	(7)
2011–2013	Macedonia	7	(0)
- * Club domestic league appearances and goals as of 1 June 2024 ‡ National team caps and goals as of 11 September 2011

Samir Fazli (Macedonian: Самир Фазли; Albanian: Samir Fazliu; born 22 April 1991) is a Macedonian professional footballer who plays as a striker for Makedonija Gjorče Petrov.

== Early life ==
Born in Skopje, Fazli lived in Canada for some time, attending Jasper Place High School in Edmonton, Alberta prior to his return to Skopje in 2007.

== Club career ==
Fazli began his career in the youth ranks of FK Makedonija Gjorče Petrov, then had trial for Sampdoria at 16 years old, but a bid by them was considered far to low according to FK Makedonija's club president. He went on trial with Dutch-side Heerenveen, On 13 March 2009, due to age restrictions, a deal could not be made for his move to Heerenveen, but he would remain in Skopje and continue to play for his club there. Heerenveen's scout Dragan Putevski stated that "he's a big deal", adding that it was his best find to date. Fazli was finally signed by the club for €200,000 on a contract that will keep him there until 2014. Fazli scored his first goal for Heerenveen on 19 March 2010. He came on as a substitute in the 81st minute and scored in the 90th minute as his team won 4–1 over NEC. He was released by SC Heerenveen in 2014 after his contract expired.

== International career ==
Fazli also a regular for the Macedonia U-21s – he played his first game on 11 February 2009 against the Croatia U-21s. He was a member of the U-17 squad before his call-up to the U-21s.

He made his senior debut for Macedonia in an August 2011 friendly match away against Azerbaijan and has earned a total of 7 caps, scoring no goals. His final international was a June 2013 friendly against Norway in Oslo.

== Personal life ==
Fazli holds passports from both Albania and Macedonia.
