= Aleksandr Poznyak =

Belarusian footballer

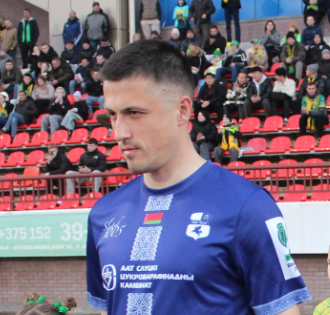

Personal information
- Date of birth: 23 July 1994 (age 32)
- Place of birth: Lida, Grodno Oblast, Belarus
- Height: 1.86 m (6 ft 1 in)
- Position: Centre back

Team information
- Current team: Smorgon
- Number: 33

Youth career
- 2011–2013: Neman Grodno

Senior career*
Years	Team	Apps	(Gls)
2014–2016	Neman Grodno	60	(0)
2014	→ Lida (loan)	13	(0)
2017–2018	Shakhtyor Soligorsk	10	(0)
2018	→ Gorodeya (loan)	26	(1)
2019	Neman Grodno	2	(0)
2019–2020	Gorodeya	30	(1)
2021	Dinamo Brest	3	(0)
2021	Rabotnički	17	(0)
2022	Minsk	12	(0)
2022	Shakhter Karagandy	11	(0)
2023	Dinamo Minsk	0	(0)
2023	→ Kuban Krasnodar (loan)	6	(0)
2023	Dinamo Brest	11	(0)
2024	Arsenal Dzerzhinsk	22	(1)
2025	Slutsk	15	(0)
2026	Lida	15	(0)
2026–	Smorgon	5	(0)

International career^{‡}
2013–2016	Belarus U21	34	(0)
2020	Belarus	1	(0)
- * Club domestic league appearances and goals as of 30 August 2026 ‡ National team caps and goals as of 26 February 2020

Aleksandr Poznyak (Belarusian: Аляксандар Пазняк; Russian: Александр Позняк; born 23 July 1994) is a Belarusian professional football player who plays as a centre-back for Smorgon.

== International career ==
Poznyak earned his first cap for the national team of his country on 26 February 2020, playing the full 90 minutes in the 1–0 away win over Bulgaria in a friendly match.
