= Andrija Filipović =

Croatian footballer (born 1997)

Personal information
- Date of birth: 18 April 1997 (age 29)
- Place of birth: Rijeka, Croatia
- Height: 1.83 m (6 ft 0 in)
- Position: Forward

Team information
- Current team: Zhenis
- Number: 11

Youth career
- 2002–2008: Crikvenica
- 2008–2016: Rijeka
- 2015: → Juventus (loan)
- 2015–2016: → Spezia Calcio (loan)

Senior career*
Years	Team	Apps	(Gls)
2016–2017	Siena	0	(0)
2017–2019	Gorica	62	(11)
2019–2020	NAC Breda	15	(1)
2020–2021	Mura	32	(4)
2021	Partizani	6	(0)
2022	Atyrau	24	(13)
2023	Aktobe	21	(4)
2024	Kisvárda	9	(1)
2024	Bunyodkor	13	(5)
2024–2025	PT Prachuap	10	(2)
2025–2026	Slaven Belupo	9	(2)
2026	Al-Talaba		
2026–	Zhenis	16	(5)

International career
2015	Croatia U19	3	(0)
- * Club domestic league appearances and goals as of 1 November 2026

Andrija Filipović (born 18 April 1997) is a Croatian professional footballer who plays as a forward for Kazakhstan Premier League club Zhenis.

== Club career ==
Born in Rijeka, Filipović played football at a youth level with HNK Rijeka before joining the youth team of Juventus in 2015 on a temporary basis. Spells with Spezia Calcio and Siena followed, before joining Slovenian side ND Gorica in February 2017 on a deal until the end of the 2019–20 season After making 62 league appearances with Gorica, scoring 11, Filipović joined Eerste Divisie side NAC Breda in the summer of 2019, signing a two-year contract with the club, with the option for a further year. After 15 appearances with Breda, scoring once, he joined Slovenian side NŠ Mura on a two-year contract on 31 January 2020, lasting until the end of 2022. However, his contract was mutually terminated in August 2021.

In September 2021, Filipović signed for Albanian club FK Partizani on a three-year contract. He left the club at the end of the calendar year, having scored twice in 10 matches in all competitions.

In February 2022, Filipović signed for Kazakhstan Premier League club FC Atyrau.

On 13 February 2023, Filipović signed for fellow Kazakhstan Premier League club Aktobe. On 24 January 2024, Aktobe announced that had left the club.

On 23 January 2024, Hungarian club Kisvárda announced the signing of Filipović.

In July 2024, he signed for Uzbek club FC Bunyodkor on a contract until the end of the 2024 season. He moved to Thai club PT Prachuap on 17 December 2024.

In September 2025, Filipović returned to Croatia, signing for Slaven Belupo on a contract until summer 2027. Filipović and Slaven Belupo mutually agreed to terminate his contract in January 2026, after two goals in nine games for the club.

In February 2026, he moved to the tenth country of his career, signing for Iraqi club Al-Talaba SC.

== International career ==
Filipović appeared for the Croatia under-19 team in a 3–1 UEFA European Under-19 Championship qualification victory against Montenegro in 2015.

== Honours ==
Mura

- Slovenian PrvaLiga: 2020–21
- Slovenian Cup: 2019–20
