= Todor Petrović =

Bosnian footballer

Personal information
- Full name: Todor Petrović
- Date of birth: 18 August 1994 (age 32)
- Place of birth: Glamoč, Bosnia and Herzegovina
- Height: 1.89 m (6 ft 2 in)
- Position: Defensive midfielder

Team information
- Current team: Voždovac
- Number: 43

Senior career*
Years	Team	Apps	(Gls)
2011–2012	Zemun	3	(0)
2012–2013	Sopot	38	(0)
2014	Xerez		
2014–2018	Voždovac	96	(2)
2019	Vorskla Poltava	21	(1)
2020	Inter Zaprešić	3	(0)
2020–2021	Radnički Niš	33	(0)
2022	Atyrau	19	(1)
2023	Cong An Nhan Dan	0	(0)
2023–2024	Javor Ivanjica	29	(2)
2024–	Voždovac	49	(2)
- * Club domestic league appearances and goals as of 14 May 2026

Todor Petrović (Serbian Cyrillic: Тодор Петровић; born 18 August 1994) is a Bosnian footballer who plays as a midfielder for Voždovac.

== Club career ==
=== Voždovac ===
Petrović signed for Voždovac in 2014, but left the club at the end of 2018, where his contract expired.

=== Vorskla Poltava ===
On 22 January 2019, Petrović signed for Ukrainian Premier League club Vorskla Poltava.

=== Inter Zaprešić ===
On 2 March 2020, Petrović joined Croatian club Inter Zaprešić.
