= Football Center Brest =

- Founded: 2016
- Ground: City Stadium, Malaryta
- Manager: Vyachaslaw Hryharaw
- League: Belarusian Second League
- Website: http://www.fcenter.by/
| Home colours | Away colours |

Football Center Brest (Belarusian: Цэнтр футбола Брэст, Russian: Центр футбола Брест) is a football team from Brest, Belarus, currently playing in the Belarusian Second League.

== History ==
Rukh Brest (Belarusian: ФК Рух Брэст) was founded in 2016 as an amateur team. In 2018, they re-established themselves as a farm club of Dinamo Brest and joined the Belarusian Second League. They won the Second League in their debut season, and made their Belarusian First League debut in 2019. Before the start of the season, they ended their partnership with Dinamo Brest and became an independent club.

The club quickly rose to the top level and spent two seasons in Belarusian Premier League (2020 and 2021). In February 2022 Rukh withdrew from Premier League league, citing financial troubles caused by international sanctions upon club's owner Alexander Zaytsev and an undisclosed Russian company co-owning the club. Despite announced intentions to play in the Second League in 2022 season, the club withdrew shortly after the calendar draw and the senior team disbanded.

Following the dissolution of their main team, the club's youth section continued participation in the domestic competitions under the new name Football Center. In 2023 Football Center joined Belarusian Second League.

== Current squad ==
As of March 2024

Note: Flags indicate national team as defined under FIFA eligibility rules; some limited exceptions apply. Players may hold more than one non-FIFA nationality.

| No. | Pos. | Nation | Player |
|---|---|---|---|
| — | GK | BLR | Yegor Lunikhin |
| — | DF | BLR | Artem Akatov |
| — | DF | BLR | Yahor Hawrylaw |
| — | DF | BLR | Filipp Polyakov |
| — | DF | BLR | Yevgeniy Radkov |
| — | MF | BLR | Daniil Antonyuk |
| — | MF | BLR | Ilya Volodkin |
| — | MF | BLR | Kirill Kovshik |

| No. | Pos. | Nation | Player |
|---|---|---|---|
| — | MF | BLR | Gleb Mishin |
| — | MF | BLR | Daniil Pesnyak |
| — | MF | BLR | Aleksey Solonevich |
| — | MF | BLR | Ilya Sychik |
| — | FW | BLR | Vladislav Saveyko |
| — | FW | BLR | Maksim Stepanyuk |
| — | FW | BLR | Zakhar Tereschenko |

== Honours ==
- Belarusian Second League
  - Winners (1): 2018
- Belarusian First League
  - Third place (1): 2019

== League and Cup history ==
| Season | Level | Pos | Pld | W | D | L | Goals | Points | Domestic Cup | Notes |
|---|---|---|---|---|---|---|---|---|---|---|
| 2018 | Belarusian Second League | 1st | 28 | 23 | 4 | 1 | 87–16 | 73 | | Promoted |
| 2019 | Belarusian First League | 3rd | 28 | 15 | 11 | 2 | 65–26 | 56 | Round of 16 | Promoted |
| 2020 | Belarusian Premier League | 6th | 28 | 11 | 11 | 2 | 57–38 | 44 | Round of 32 | |
| 2021 | Belarusian Premier League | 5th | 28 | 16 | 10 | 4 | 52–28 | 58 | Round of 16 | withdrew |
| 2022 | Belarusian Second League | | | | | | | | | |
