= FC Ordabasy in Continental football =

Overview of FC Ordabasy's role in continental football

Ordabasy in Continental football
- Club: Ordabasy
- Top scorer: Mansour Gueye; Vsevolod Sadovsky (3 goals)
- First entry: 1996–97 Asian Cup Winners' Cup
- Latest entry: 2024–25 UEFA Europa Conference League

FC Ordabasy is a Kazakh football club based in Shymkent, Kazakhstan.

== History ==
=== Europe ===
In 2000, the Kazakhstan Football Federation became a candidate member of UEFA, and obtained its full membership on 25 April 2002 at the UEFA Congress in Stockholm, Sweden. This resulted in Ordabasy and the other domestic teams from Kazakhstan switching to the UEFA club competitions.

=== Matches ===
As of match played 17 July 2025

| Season | Competition | Round | Club | Home | Away | Aggregate |
|---|---|---|---|---|---|---|
| 1996–97 | Asian Cup Winners' Cup | First round | (Turkmenistan) Turan Daşoguz | 5–1 | 0–0 | 5–1 |
| 1996–97 | Asian Cup Winners' Cup | Second round | (Kyrgyzstan) Semetei Kyzyl-Kiya | 7–2 | 0–1 | 7–3 |
| 1996–97 | Asian Cup Winners' Cup | Quarter-finals | (Iran) Esteghlal | 0–1 | 0–0 | 0–1 |
| 2012–13 | UEFA Europa League | 1Q | (Serbia) Jagodina | 0–0 | 1–0 | 1–0 |
| 2012–13 | UEFA Europa League | 2Q | (Norway) Rosenborg | 1–2 | 2–2 | 3–4 |
| 2015–16 | UEFA Europa League | 1Q | (Israel) Beitar Jerusalem | 0–0 | 1–2 | 1–2 |
| 2016–17 | UEFA Europa League | 1Q | (Serbia) Čukarički | 3–3 | 0–3 | 3–6 |
| 2017–18 | UEFA Europa League | 1Q | (Bosnia and Herzegovina) Široki Brijeg | 0–0 | 0–2 | 0–2 |
| 2019–20 | UEFA Europa League | 1Q | (Georgia (country)) Torpedo Kutaisi | 1–0 | 2–0 | 3–0 |
| 2019–20 | UEFA Europa League | 2Q | (Czech Republic) Mladá Boleslav | 2–3 | 1–1 | 3–4 |
| 2020–21 | UEFA Europa League | 1Q | (Romania) Botoșani | 1–2 | — | — |
| 2023–24 | UEFA Europa Conference League | 2Q | (Poland) Legia Warsaw | 2–2 | 2–3 | 4–5 |
| 2024–25 | UEFA Champions League | 1Q | (Moldova) Petrocub Hîncești | 0–0 | 0–1 | 0−1 |
| 2024–25 | UEFA Conference League | 2Q | (Luxembourg) Differdange 03 | 4–3 | 0–1 | 4−4 (4–3 p) |
| 2024–25 | UEFA Conference League | 3Q | (Armenia) Pyunik | 0–1 | 0–1 | 0−2 |
| 2025–26 | UEFA Conference League | 1Q | (Georgia (country)) Torpedo Kutaisi | 1–1 | 3–4 | 4−5 |

== Player statistics ==
=== Appearances ===
As of match played 17 July 2025

| | Name | Years | Asian Cup Winners' Cup | UEFA Champions League | UEFA Europa League | UEFA Europa Conference League | Total | Ratio |
|---|---|---|---|---|---|---|---|---|
| 1 | (Kazakhstan) Serhiy Malyi (Note: Malyi was born in Luhansk, Ukraine, but went on to represent Kazakhstan at international level.) | 2015, 2019, 2023–Present | (-) | 2 (0) | 6 (0) | 7 (1) | 15 (1) | 0.07 |
| 2 | (Kazakhstan) Temirlan Yerlanov | 2016–2019, 2021, 2023–2024 | (-) | 1 (0) | 7 (2) | 5 (0) | 13 (2) | 0.15 |
| 3 | (Kazakhstan) Yerkebulan Tungyshbayev | 2013–2019, 2021–2022, 2023–Present | (-) | 2 (0) | 5 (1) | 4 (0) | 11 (1) | 0.09 |
| 4 | (Senegal) Abdoulaye Diakate | 2014, 2016–2021 | (-) | (-) | 9 (1) | (-) | 9 (1) | 0.11 |
| 5 | (Kazakhstan) Talgat Adyrbekov | 2011-2021 | (-) | (-) | 8 (0) | (-) | 8 (0) | 0 |
| 5 | (Kazakhstan) Askhat Tagybergen | 2023-2025 | (-) | 2 (0) | (-) | 6 (1) | 8 (1) | 0.13 |
| 5 | (Ukraine) Yevhen Makarenko | 2023-2024 | (-) | 2 (0) | (-) | 6 (0) | 8 (0) | 0 |
| 5 | (Kazakhstan) Bauyrzhan Islamkhan | 2023-2025 | (-) | 2 (0) | (-) | 6 (0) | 8 (0) | 0 |
| 5 | (Kazakhstan) Sultanbek Astanov | 2021, 2023-Present | (-) | 2 (0) | (-) | 6 (0) | 8 (0) | 0 |
| 10 | (Serbia) Aleksandar Simčević | 2015-2017, 2020-2021 | (-) | (-) | 7 (0) | (-) | 7 (0) | 0 |
| 10 | (Argentina) Pablo Fontanello | 2017-2021 | (-) | (-) | 7 (0) | (-) | 7 (0) | 0 |
| 12 | (Kazakhstan) Almat Bekbayev | 2005, 2008-2012, 2016-2017 | (-) | (-) | 6 (0) | (-) | 6 (0) | 0 |
| 12 | (Kazakhstan) Bekzat Beisenov | 2006-2009, 2011-2017 | (-) | (-) | 6 (0) | (-) | 6 (0) | 0 |
| 12 | (Ukraine) Artem Kasyanov | 2010-2015 | (-) | (-) | 6 (0) | (-) | 6 (0) | 0 |
| 12 | (Kazakhstan) Mardan Tolebek | 2010-2021 | (-) | (-) | 6 (0) | (-) | 6 (0) | 0 |
| 12 | (Ukraine) Ihor Plastun | 2024 | (-) | 2 (0) | (-) | 4 (0) | 6 (0) | 0 |
| 12 | (Uzbekistan) Shokhboz Umarov | 2022, 2023-2025 | (-) | 0 (0) | (-) | 6 (0) | 6 (0) | 0 |
| 12 | (Belarus) Vsevolod Sadovsky | 2019, 2020–2021 | (-) | 1 (0) | (-) | 5 (3) | 6 (3) | 0.5 |
| 12 | (The Gambia) Dembo Darboe | 2024 | (-) | 2 (0) | (-) | 4 (0) | 6 (0) | 0 |
| 12 | (Kazakhstan) Aybol Abiken | 2024 | (-) | 2 (0) | (-) | 4 (0) | 6 (0) | 0 |
| 12 | (Kazakhstan) Bekkhan Shayzada | 2018-Present | (-) | (-) | 1 (0) | 5 (0) | 6 (0) | 0 |
| 22 | (Kazakhstan) Daurenbek Tazhimbetov | 2010-2012, 2014-2016 | (-) | (-) | 5 (0) | (-) | 5 (0) | 0 |
| 22 | (Ukraine) Kyrylo Kovalchuk | 2017-2019 | (-) | (-) | 5 (0) | (-) | 5 (0) | 0 |
| 22 | (Bosnia and Herzegovina) Mirzad Mehanović | 2018–2019, 2020–2021 | (-) | (-) | 5 (2) | (-) | 5 (2) | 0.4 |
| 22 | (Kazakhstan) Timur Dosmagambetov | 2018-2021 | (-) | (-) | 5 (0) | (-) | 5 (0) | 0 |
| 22 | (South Africa) May Mahlangu | 2019, 2020–2021 | (-) | (-) | 5 (1) | (-) | 5 (1) | 0.2 |
| 22 | (Belgium) Ziguy Badibanga | 2019–2021 | (-) | (-) | 5 (1) | (-) | 5 (1) | 0.2 |
| 22 | (Brazil) João Paulo | 2019, 2020-2021 | (-) | (-) | 5 (0) | (-) | 5 (0) | 0 |
| 22 | (Kazakhstan) Gafurzhan Suyumbayev | 2010-2016, 2023-2025 | (-) | 1 (0) | 2 (0) | 2 (0) | 5 (0) | 0 |
| 22 | (Serbia) Zlatan Šehović | 2024 | (-) | 2 (0) | (-) | 3 (0) | 5 (0) | 0 |
| 22 | (Uzbekistan) Jasurbek Yakhshiboev | 2024 | (-) | 2 (0) | (-) | 3 (0) | 5 (0) | 0 |
| 22 | (Ukraine) Artem Byesyedin | 2023-2024 | (-) | 2 (0) | (-) | 3 (0) | 5 (0) | 0 |
| 22 | (Kazakhstan) Sagadat Tursynbay | 2018-Present | (-) | 2 (0) | (-) | 3 (2) | 5 (2) | 0.4 |
| 34 | (Kazakhstan) Azat Nurgaliyev | 2004-2005, 2011, 2013-2017 | (-) | (-) | 4 (0) | (-) | 4 (0) | 0 |
| 34 | (Tunisia) Mohamed Larbi Arouri | 2010, 2012-2013 | (-) | (-) | 4 (0) | (-) | 4 (0) | 0 |
| 34 | (Serbia) Aleksandar Trajkovic | 2010-2012 | (-) | (-) | 4 (0) | (-) | 4 (0) | 0 |
| 34 | (Uganda) Andrew Mwesigwa | 2011-2014 | (-) | (-) | 4 (0) | (-) | 4 (0) | 0 |
| 34 | (Nigeria) Babajide Collins | 2011, 2012-2013 | (-) | (-) | 4 (0) | (-) | 4 (0) | 0 |
| 34 | (Kazakhstan) Andrey Karpovich | 2012-2013 | (-) | (-) | 4 (0) | (-) | 4 (0) | 0 |
| 34 | (Kazakhstan) Roman Pakholyuk | 2012, 2013 | (-) | (-) | 4 (0) | (-) | 4 (0) | 0 |
| 34 | (Senegal) Mansour Gueye | 2012–2013 | (-) | (-) | 4 (3) | (-) | 4 (3) | 0.75 |
| 34 | (Serbia) Vladimir Đilas | 2012 | (-) | (-) | 4 (0) | (-) | 4 (0) | 0 |
| 34 | (Uzbekistan) Alexander Geynrikh | 2015–2017 | (-) | (-) | 4 (1) | (-) | 4 (1) | 0.25 |
| 34 | (Kazakhstan) Dmytro Nepohodov (Note: Nepohodov was born in Kyiv, Ukraine, but went on to represent Kazakhstan at international level.) | 2019 | (-) | (-) | 4 (0) | (-) | 4 (0) | 0 |
| 34 | (Kazakhstan) Aleksey Shchyotkin | 2019 | (-) | (-) | 4 (1) | (-) | 4 (1) | 0.25 |
| 34 | (Kazakhstan) Marat Bystrov | 2019, 2020 | (-) | (-) | 4 (0) | (-) | 4 (0) | 0 |
| 34 | (Belarus) Sergey Ignatovich | 2024 | (-) | 2 (0) | (-) | 2 (0) | 4 (0) | 0 |
| 34 | (Brazil) Reginaldo | 2024 | (-) | 0 (0) | (-) | 4 (0) | 4 (0) | 0 |
| 34 | (Croatia) Lovro Cvek | 2024 | (-) | 1 (0) | (-) | 3 (0) | 4 (0) | 0 |
| 50 | (Kazakhstan) Mukhtar Mukhtarov | 2004-2011, 2012-2017 | (-) | (-) | 3 (0) | (-) | 3 (0) | 0 |
| 50 | (Kazakhstan) Kairat Ashirbekov | 2010-2019 | (-) | (-) | 3 (0) | (-) | 3 (0) | 0 |
| 50 | (Kazakhstan) Toktar Zhangylyshbay | 2012-2019 | (-) | (-) | 3 (0) | (-) | 3 (0) | 0 |
| 50 | (Kazakhstan) Renat Abdulin | 2013, 2015-2017 | (-) | (-) | 3 (0) | (-) | 3 (0) | 0 |
| 54 | (Kazakhstan) Bakdaulet Kozhabayev | 2010-2013, 2014-2018 | (-) | (-) | 2 (0) | (-) | 2 (0) | 0 |
| 54 | (Kazakhstan) Samat Shamshi | 2013-2015, 2018-2023 | (-) | (-) | 2 (0) | (-) | 2 (0) | 0 |
| 54 | (Kazakhstan) Andrei Sidelnikov (Note: Sidelnikov was born in Moscow, Russian SSR, but went on to represent Kazakhstan at international level.) | 2015 | (-) | (-) | 2 (0) | (-) | 2 (0) | 0 |
| 54 | (Ukraine) Kyrylo Petrov | 2015 | (-) | (-) | 2 (1) | (-) | 2 (1) | 0.5 |
| 54 | (Kazakhstan) Sergey Boychenko | 2015 | (-) | (-) | 2 (0) | (-) | 2 (0) | 0 |
| 54 | (Nigeria) Dominic Chatto | 2016 | (-) | (-) | 2 (0) | (-) | 2 (0) | 0 |
| 54 | (Georgia (country)) Gogita Gogua | 2016-2017 | (-) | (-) | 2 (0) | (-) | 2 (0) | 0 |
| 54 | (Montenegro) Filip Kasalica | 2016 | (-) | (-) | 2 (0) | (-) | 2 (0) | 0 |
| 54 | (Kazakhstan) Samat Smakov | 2016-2017 | (-) | (-) | 2 (0) | (-) | 2 (0) | 0 |
| 54 | (Russia) Nikita Bocharov | 2017-2018 | (-) | (-) | 2 (0) | (-) | 2 (0) | 0 |
| 54 | (Kazakhstan) Vitali Li | 2017-2020 | (-) | (-) | 2 (0) | (-) | 2 (0) | 0 |
| 54 | (Senegal) Mamadou Mbodj | 2023 | (-) | (-) | (-) | 2 (1) | 2 (1) | 0.5 |
| 54 | (Croatia) Bernardo Matić | 2023-2024 | (-) | (-) | (-) | 2 (0) | 2 (0) | 0 |
| 54 | (Uzbekistan) Bobur Abdikholikov | 2023 | (-) | (-) | (-) | 2 (0) | 2 (0) | 0 |
| 54 | (Brazil) Auro Jr. | 2023 | (-) | (-) | (-) | 2 (0) | 2 (0) | 0 |
| 54 | (Colombia) Cristian Tovar | 2024 | (-) | 0 (0) | (-) | 2 (0) | 2 (0) | 0 |
| 54 | (Serbia) Nikola Antić | 2025-Present | (-) | (-) | (-) | 2 (0) | 2 (0) | 0 |
| 54 | (Kazakhstan) Ular Zhaksybaev | 2025-Present | (-) | (-) | (-) | 2 (0) | 2 (0) | 0 |
| 54 | (Brazil) Everton Moraes | 2025-Present | (-) | (-) | (-) | 2 (0) | 2 (0) | 0 |
| 54 | (Ukraine) Yuriy Vakulko | 2025-Present | (-) | (-) | (-) | 2 (0) | 2 (0) | 0 |
| 54 | (Ivory Coast) Sherif Jimoh | 2025-Present | (-) | (-) | (-) | 2 (0) | 2 (0) | 0 |
| 54 | (Kazakhstan) Murodzhon Khalmatov | 2021-Present | (-) | (-) | (-) | 2 (0) | 2 (0) | 0 |
| 54 | (Ukraine) Vladyslav Naumets | 2025-Present | (-) | (-) | (-) | 2 (0) | 2 (0) | 0 |
| 54 | (Georgia (country)) Luka Imnadze | 2025-Present | (-) | (-) | (-) | 2 (1) | 2 (1) | 0.5 |
| 54 | (Romania) Mihai Căpățînă | 2025-Present | (-) | (-) | (-) | 2 (1) | 2 (1) | 0.5 |
| 79 | (Kazakhstan) Sanat Zhumahanov | 2005-2008, 2013, 2017 | (-) | (-) | 1 (0) | (-) | 1 (0) | 0 |
| 79 | (Kazakhstan) Tanat Nuserbayev | 2006-2010, 2017-2018 | (-) | (-) | 1 (0) | (-) | 1 (0) | 0 |
| 79 | (Kazakhstan) Dauren Kaykibasov | 2012-2019 | (-) | (-) | 1 (0) | (-) | 1 (0) | 0 |
| 79 | (Bosnia and Herzegovina) Ivan Božić | 2015 | (-) | (-) | 1 (0) | (-) | 1 (0) | 0 |
| 79 | (Serbia) Branislav Trajković | 2015-2017 | (-) | (-) | 1 (0) | (-) | 1 (0) | 0 |
| 79 | (Bulgaria) Preslav Yordanov | 2017 | (-) | (-) | 1 (0) | (-) | 1 (0) | 0 |
| 79 | (Kazakhstan) Damir Dautov | 2018-2021 | (-) | (-) | 1 (0) | (-) | 1 (0) | 0 |
| 79 | (Kazakhstan) Sergey Khizhnichenko | 2018, 2020-2021 | (-) | (-) | 1 (0) | (-) | 1 (0) | 0 |
| 79 | (Kazakhstan) Viktor Dmitrenko (Note: Dmitrenko was born in Primorsko-Akhtarsk, Russian SSR, but went on to represent Kazakhstan at international level.) | 2020-2021 | (-) | (-) | 1 (0) | (-) | 1 (0) | 0 |
| 79 | (Portugal) Rúben Brígido | 2020-2021 | (-) | (-) | 1 (0) | (-) | 1 (0) | 0 |
| 79 | (Kazakhstan) Duman Narzildayev | 2023 | (-) | (-) | (-) | 1 (0) | 1 (0) | 0 |
| 79 | (Guinea-Bissau) Jorginho | 2023 | (-) | (-) | (-) | 1 (0) | 1 (0) | 0 |
| 79 | (Kazakhstan) Aybar Zhaksylykov | 2023 | (-) | (-) | (-) | 1 (0) | 1 (0) | 0 |
| 79 | (Cape Verde) João Paulino | 2025-Present | (-) | (-) | (-) | 1 (0) | 1 (0) | 0 |
| 79 | (Croatia) Dario Čanađija | 2025-Present | (-) | (-) | (-) | 1 (0) | 1 (0) | 0 |
| 79 | (Moldova) Dumitru Celeadnic | 2025-Present | (-) | (-) | (-) | 1 (0) | 1 (0) | 0 |
| 79 | (Kazakhstan) Zikrillo Sultaniyazov | 2021-Present | (-) | (-) | (-) | 1 (0) | 1 (0) | 0 |
| 79 | (Kazakhstan) Abylaykhan Zhumabek | 2025-Present | (-) | (-) | (-) | 1 (0) | 1 (0) | 0 |

=== Goalscorers ===
As of match played 17 July 2025

| | Name | Years | Asian Cup Winners' Cup | UEFA Champions League | UEFA Europa League | UEFA Conference League | Total | Ratio |
|---|---|---|---|---|---|---|---|---|
| 1 | (Senegal) Mansour Gueye | 2012–2013 | (-) | (-) | 3 (4) | (-) | 3 (4) | 0.75 |
| 1 | (Belarus) Vsevolod Sadovsky | 2022–2024 | (-) | 0 (1) | (-) | 3 (5) | 3 (6) | 0.5 |
| 3 | (Kazakhstan) Temirlan Yerlanov | 2016–2019, 2021, 2023–2024 | (-) | 0 (1) | 2 (7) | 0 (5) | 2 (13) | 0.15 |
| 3 | (Bosnia and Herzegovina) Mirzad Mehanović | 2018–2019, 2020–2021 | (-) | (-) | 2 (5) | (-) | 2 (5) | 0.4 |
| 3 | (Kazakhstan) Sagadat Tursynbay | 2018-Present | (-) | 0 (2) | (-) | 2 (3) | 2 (5) | 0.4 |
| 6 | (Ukraine) Roman Pakholyuk | 2003, 2012, 2013 | (-) | (-) | 1 (4) | (-) | 1 (4) | 0.25 |
| 6 | (Ukraine) Kyrylo Petrov | 2015 | (-) | (-) | 1 (2) | (-) | 1 (2) | 0.5 |
| 6 | (Uzbekistan) Alexander Geynrikh | 2015–2017 | (-) | (-) | 1 (4) | (-) | 1 (4) | 0.25 |
| 6 | (Kazakhstan) Yerkebulan Tungyshbayev | 2013–2019, 2021–2022, 2023–Present | (-) | 0 (2) | 1 (5) | 0 (4) | 1 (11) | 0.09 |
| 6 | (Belgium) Ziguy Badibanga | 2019–2021 | (-) | (-) | 1 (5) | (-) | 1 (5) | 0.2 |
| 6 | (Kazakhstan) Aleksey Shchyotkin | 2019 | (-) | (-) | 1 (4) | (-) | 1 (4) | 0.25 |
| 6 | (Senegal) Abdoulaye Diakate | 2014, 2016–2021 | (-) | (-) | 1 (9) | (-) | 1 (9) | 0.11 |
| 6 | (South Africa) May Mahlangu | 2019, 2020–2021 | (-) | (-) | 1 (5) | (-) | 1 (5) | 0.2 |
| 6 | (Senegal) Mamadou Mbodj | 2023 | (-) | (-) | (-) | 1 (2) | 1 (2) | 0.5 |
| 6 | (Kazakhstan) Serhiy Malyi | 2015, 2019, 2023–Present | (-) | 0 (2) | 0 (6) | 1 (7) | 1 (15) | 0.07 |
| 6 | (Kazakhstan) Askhat Tagybergen | 2023–Present | (-) | 0 (2) | (-) | 1 (8) | 1 (10) | 0.1 |
| 6 | (Georgia (country)) Luka Imnadze | 2025-Present | (-) | (-) | (-) | 1 (2) | 1 (2) | 0.5 |
| 6 | (Romania) Mihai Căpățînă | 2025-Present | (-) | (-) | (-) | 1 (2) | 1 (2) | 0.5 |
| 6 | (Kazakhstan) Abylaykhan Zhumabek | 2025-Present | (-) | (-) | (-) | 1 (1) | 1 (1) | 1 |
| 6 | Own goal | 1996–Present | 0 (6) | 0 (2) | 0 (15) | 1 (8) | 1 (31) | 0.03 |

=== Clean sheets ===
As of match played 17 July 2025

| | Name | Years | Asian Cup Winners' Cup | UEFA Champions League | UEFA Europa League | UEFA Conference League | Total | Ratio |
|---|---|---|---|---|---|---|---|---|
| 1 | (Kazakhstan) Almat Bekbayev | 2005, 2008-2012, 2016-2017 | (-) | (-) | 3 (6) | (-) | 3 (6) | 0.5 |
| 2 | (Kazakhstan) Dmytro Nepohodov | 2019 | (-) | (-) | 2 (4) | (-) | 2 (4) | 0.5 |
| 3 | (Kazakhstan) Andrei Sidelnikov | 2015 | (-) | (-) | 1 (2) | (-) | 1 (2) | 0.5 |
| 3 | (Belarus) Sergey Ignatovich | 2024 | (-) | 1 (2) | (-) | 0 (2) | 1 (4) | 0.25 |
| 5 | (Kazakhstan) Sergey Boychenko | 2015 | (-) | (-) | 0 (2) | (-) | 0 (2) | 0 |
| 5 | (Kazakhstan) Bekkhan Shayzada | 2018-Present | (-) | (-) | 0 (1) | 0 (5) | 0 (6) | 0 |
| 5 | (Moldova) Dumitru Celeadnic | 2025-Present | (-) | (-) | (-) | 0 (1) | 0 (1) | 0 |

== Overall record ==
=== By competition ===
As of match played 17 July 2025

| Competition | GP | W | D | L | GF | GA | +/- |
|---|---|---|---|---|---|---|---|
| Asian Cup Winners' Cup | 6 | 2 | 2 | 2 | 12 | 5 | +7 |
| UEFA Europa League | 15 | 3 | 6 | 6 | 15 | 18 | –3 |
| UEFA Conference League | 8 | 1 | 2 | 5 | 12 | 16 | –3 |
| UEFA Champions League | 2 | 0 | 1 | 1 | 0 | 1 | -1 |
| Total | 31 | 6 | 11 | 14 | 39 | 40 | -1 |

=== By country ===
As of match played 17 July 2025

| Country | Pld | W | D | L | GF | GA | GD | Win% |
|---|---|---|---|---|---|---|---|---|
| Armenia | 2 | 0 | 0 | 2 | 0 | 2 | −2 | 0.00 |
| Bosnia and Herzegovina | 2 | 0 | 1 | 1 | 0 | 2 | −2 | 0.00 |
| Czech Republic | 2 | 0 | 1 | 1 | 3 | 4 | −1 | 0.00 |
| Georgia | 4 | 2 | 1 | 1 | 7 | 5 | +2 | 50.00 |
| Iran | 2 | 0 | 1 | 1 | 0 | 1 | −1 | 0.00 |
| Israel | 2 | 0 | 1 | 1 | 1 | 2 | −1 | 0.00 |
| Kyrgyzstan | 2 | 1 | 0 | 1 | 7 | 3 | +4 | 50.00 |
| Luxembourg | 2 | 1 | 0 | 1 | 4 | 4 | +0 | 50.00 |
| Moldova | 2 | 0 | 1 | 1 | 0 | 1 | −1 | 0.00 |
| Norway | 2 | 0 | 1 | 1 | 3 | 4 | −1 | 0.00 |
| Poland | 2 | 0 | 1 | 1 | 4 | 5 | −1 | 0.00 |
| Romania | 1 | 0 | 0 | 1 | 1 | 2 | −1 | 0.00 |
| Serbia | 4 | 1 | 2 | 1 | 4 | 6 | −2 | 25.00 |
| Turkmenistan | 2 | 1 | 1 | 0 | 5 | 1 | +4 | 50.00 |

=== By club ===
As of match played 17 July 2025

| Opponent | Played | Won | Drawn | Lost | For | Against | Difference | Ratio |
|---|---|---|---|---|---|---|---|---|
| (Israel) Beitar Jerusalem | 2 | 0 | 1 | 1 | 1 | 2 | −1 | 0.00 |
| (Romania) Botoșani | 1 | 0 | 0 | 1 | 1 | 2 | −1 | 0.00 |
| (Serbia) Čukarički | 2 | 0 | 1 | 1 | 3 | 6 | −3 | 0.00 |
| (Luxembourg) Differdange 03 | 2 | 1 | 0 | 1 | 4 | 4 | +0 | 50.00 |
| (Iran) Esteghlal | 2 | 0 | 1 | 1 | 0 | 1 | −1 | 0.00 |
| (Serbia) Jagodina | 2 | 1 | 1 | 0 | 1 | 0 | +1 | 50.00 |
| (Poland) Legia Warsaw | 2 | 0 | 1 | 1 | 4 | 5 | −1 | 0.00 |
| (Czech Republic) Mladá Boleslav | 2 | 0 | 1 | 1 | 3 | 4 | −1 | 0.00 |
| (Moldova) Petrocub Hîncești | 2 | 0 | 1 | 1 | 0 | 1 | −1 | 0.00 |
| (Armenia) Pyunik | 2 | 0 | 0 | 2 | 0 | 2 | −2 | 0.00 |
| (Norway) Rosenborg | 2 | 0 | 1 | 1 | 3 | 4 | −1 | 0.00 |
| (Kyrgyzstan) Shakhtyor Kyzyl-Kiya | 2 | 1 | 0 | 1 | 7 | 3 | +4 | 50.00 |
| (Bosnia and Herzegovina) Široki Brijeg | 2 | 0 | 1 | 1 | 0 | 2 | −2 | 0.00 |
| (Georgia (country)) Torpedo Kutaisi | 4 | 2 | 1 | 1 | 7 | 5 | +2 | 50.00 |
| (Turkmenistan) Turan Daşoguz | 2 | 1 | 1 | 0 | 5 | 1 | +4 | 50.00 |
