= 2020 FC Ordabasy season =

FC Ordabasy
2020 season
- Chairman: Kaysar Abdraymov
- Manager: Kakhaber Tskhadadze
- Stadium: Kazhymukan Munaitpasov Stadium
- Premier League: 5th
- Kazakhstan Cup: Canceled due to the COVID-19 pandemic
- Europa League: First qualifying round vs Botoșani
- Top goalscorer: League: João Paulo (12); All: João Paulo (12)
Home colours	Away colours

The 2020 FC Ordabasy season was the 18th successive season that the club played in the Kazakhstan Premier League, the highest tier of association football in Kazakhstan.

== Season events ==
On 13 March, the Football Federation of Kazakhstan announced all league fixtures would be played behind closed doors for the foreseeable future due to the COVID-19 pandemic. On 16 March the Football Federation of Kazakhstan suspended all football until 15 April.

On 26 July, it was announced that the league would resume on 1 July, with no fans being permitted to watch the games. The league was suspended for a second time on 3 July, for an initial two weeks, due to an increase in COVID-19 cases in the country.

== Squad ==
As of match played 30 November 2020

No.	Name	Nationality	Position	Date of birth (age)	Signed from	Signed in	Contract ends	Apps.	Goals
Goalkeepers
1	Bekkhan Shayzada	(Kazakhstan)	GK	28 February 1998 (aged 22)	Youth Team	2016		18	0
42	Igor Trofimets	(Kazakhstan)	GK	20 August 1996 (aged 24)	Aktobe	2020		0	0
86	Vladimir Plotnikov	(Kazakhstan)	GK	3 April 1986 (aged 34)	Kairat	2020		12	0
Defenders
4	Viktor Dmitrenko	(Kazakhstan)	DF	4 April 1991 (aged 29)	Tobol	2020		13	1
5	Damir Dautov	(Kazakhstan)	DF	3 March 1990 (aged 30)	Irtysh Pavlodar	2018		40	0
6	Ular Zhaksybaev	(Kazakhstan)	DF	20 October 1994 (aged 26)	Youth Team	2015		28	0
17	Mardan Tolebek	(Kazakhstan)	DF	18 December 1990 (aged 29)	Youth Team	2010		170	13
24	Aleksandr Kleshchenko	(Russia)	DF	2 November 1995 (aged 25)	Yenisey Krasnoyarsk	2020		15	0
29	Pablo Fontanello	(Argentina)	DF	25 February 1984 (aged 36)	Ural Yekaterinburg	2017		120	5
72	Andrey Shabaev	(Kazakhstan)	DF	15 February 1987 (aged 33)	Atyrau	2020		2	0
77	Talgat Adyrbekov	(Kazakhstan)	DF	26 January 1989 (aged 31)	Okzhetpes	2018		3	0
87	Aleksandar Simčević	(Serbia)	DF	3 March 1990 (aged 30)	Taraz	2020		97	7
Midfielders
7	May Mahlangu	(South Africa)	MF	1 May 1989 (aged 31)	from Ludogorets Razgrad	2020		55	4
10	Mirzad Mehanović	(Bosnia and Herzegovina)	MF	5 January 1993 (aged 27)	Fastav Zlín	2020		61	6
11	Rúben Brígido	(Portugal)	MF	23 June 1991 (aged 29)	Beroe Stara Zagora	2020		21	3
14	Samat Shamshi	(Kazakhstan)	MF	5 December 1996 (aged 23)	Kyran	2018		41	0
18	Maksim Vaganov	(Kazakhstan)	MF	8 August 2000 (aged 20)	Youth Team	2019		4	1
22	Abdoulaye Diakate	(Senegal)	MF	16 January 1988 (aged 32)	Atyrau	2016		187	24
27	Timur Dosmagambetov	(Kazakhstan)	MF	1 May 1989 (aged 31)	Okzhetpes	2018		89	5
28	Asludin Khadzhiev	(Kazakhstan)	MF	24 October 2000 (aged 20)	Youth Team	2019		15	0
33	Elkhan Astanov	(Kazakhstan)	MF	21 May 2000 (aged 20)	Youth Team	2019		15	0
Forwards
20	Toktar Zhangylyshbay	(Kazakhstan)	FW	25 May 1993 (aged 27)	Tobol	2019		62	9
37	João Paulo	(Brazil)	FW	2 June 1988 (aged 32)	Ludogorets Razgrad	2020		58	27
39	Ziguy Badibanga	(Belgium)	FW	26 November 1991 (aged 29)	Sheriff Tiraspol	2019		51	6
91	Sergei Khizhnichenko	(Kazakhstan)	FW	17 July 1991 (aged 29)	Astana	2020		24	3
Players away on loan
13	Sagadat Tursynbay	(Kazakhstan)	DF	26 March 1999 (aged 21)	Youth Team	2018		0	0
Players that left during the season
19	Marat Bystrov	(Kazakhstan)	DF	19 June 1992 (aged 28)	loan from Astana	2020		35	0

=== Out on loan ===
Note: Flags indicate national team as defined under FIFA eligibility rules; some limited exceptions apply. Players may hold more than one non-FIFA nationality.

No.	Pos.	Nation	Player
13	DF	KAZ	Sagadat Tursynbay (at (Kazakhstan) Tobol)

== Transfers ==
=== In ===
Date	Position	Nationality	Name	From	Fee	Ref.
Winter 2020	GK	(Kazakhstan)	Igor Trofimets	Aktobe	Undisclosed	
Winter 2020	DF	(Kazakhstan)	Viktor Dmitrenko	Tobol	Undisclosed	
Winter 2020	FW	(Brazil)	João Paulo	Ludogorets Razgrad	Undisclosed	
11 February 2020	GK	(Kazakhstan)	Vladimir Plotnikov	Kairat	Undisclosed	
11 February 2020	DF	(Russia)	Aleksandr Kleshchenko	Yenisey Krasnoyarsk	Undisclosed	
11 February 2020	DF	(Serbia)	Aleksandar Simčević	Taraz	Undisclosed	
11 February 2020	MF	(Bosnia and Herzegovina)	Mirzad Mehanović	Fastav Zlín	Undisclosed	
11 February 2020	MF	(South Africa)	May Mahlangu	Ludogorets Razgrad	Undisclosed	
11 February 2020	FW	(Kazakhstan)	Sergei Khizhnichenko	Astana	Free	
14 February 2020	MF	(Portugal)	Rúben Brígido	Beroe Stara Zagora	Undisclosed	
25 February 2020	DF	(Kazakhstan)	Marat Bystrov	Astana	Undisclosed	
29 August 2020	DF	(Kazakhstan)	Andrey Shabaev	Atyrau	Undisclosed	

=== Out ===
Date	Position	Nationality	Name	To	Fee	Ref.
16 August 2020	DF	(Kazakhstan)	Marat Bystrov	Akhmat Grozny	Undisclosed	

=== Loans out ===
Date from	Position	Nationality	Name	To	Date to	Ref.
5 January 2021	DF	(Kazakhstan)	Sagadat Tursynbay	Tobol	End of season	

=== Released ===
Date	Position	Nationality	Name	Joined	Date	Ref.
31 December 2020	DF	(Kazakhstan)	Talgat Adyrbekov			
31 December 2020	DF	(Kazakhstan)	Damir Dautov			
31 December 2020	DF	(Kazakhstan)	Viktor Dmitrenko	Atyrau		
31 December 2020	DF	(Kazakhstan)	Andrey Shabaev	Zhetysu		
31 December 2020	DF	(Kazakhstan)	Mardan Tolebek	Turan		
31 December 2020	DF	(Kazakhstan)	Ular Zhaksybaev			
31 December 2020	MF	(Kazakhstan)	Maksim Vaganov			
31 December 2020	FW	(Belgium)	Ziguy Badibanga	Shakhter Karagandy	11 April 2021	

== Friendlies ==
27 January 2020	Ordabasy (Kazakhstan)	1 – 1	(Bulgaria) Beroe Stara Zagora	Belek, Turkey
(UTC+6)	João Paulo	Report	Goal

31 January 2020	Ordabasy (Kazakhstan)	1 – 1	(Kosovo) Prishtina	Belek, Turkey
(UTC+6)	Khizhnichenko	Report	Goal

3 February 2020	Ordabasy (Kazakhstan)	1 – 1	(Serbia) Proleter Novi Sad	Belek, Turkey
(UTC+6)	Diakate	Report	Goal

6 February 2020	Shinnik Yaroslavl (Russia)	2 – 0	(Kazakhstan) Ordabasy	Antalya, Turkey
14:30 (UTC+6)	Nizamutdinov 18' (pen.), 39'	Report

6 February 2020	Zorya Luhansk (Ukraine)	3 – 0	(Kazakhstan) Ordabasy	Antalya, Turkey
20:00 (UTC+6)	Kabayev 44', 50'; Cigaņiks 75'	Report

13 February 2020	Ordabasy (Kazakhstan)	1 – 1	(Armenia) Alashkert	Belek, Turkey
20:00 (UTC+6)	Fontanello	Report	A.Glišić

16 February 2020	Ordabasy (Kazakhstan)	2 – 0	(Ukraine) Vorskla Poltava	Antalya, Turkey
(UTC+6)	João Paulo; Simčević	Report

20 February 2020	Arsenal Tula (Russia)	2 – 0	(Kazakhstan) Ordabasy	Antalya, Turkey
20:00 (UTC+6)	Kostadinov 16'; Minayev 67'	Report

22 February 2020	Ordabasy (Kazakhstan)	2 – 1	(Georgia (country)) Samtredia	Antalya, Turkey
(UTC+6)	D.Dautov; Brígido	Report	Goal

== Competitions ==
=== Premier League ===
==== Results summary ====
Overall								Home						Away					
Pld	W	D	L	GF	GA	GD	Pts	W	D	L	GF	GA	GD	W	D	L	GF	GA	GD
20	9	4	7	27	25	+2	31	4	1	5	9	14	−5	5	3	2	18	11	+7

Last updated: 30 November 2020.
Source: See Results

==== Results by round ====
Round	1	2	3	4	5	6	7	8	9	10	11	12	13	14	15	16	17	18	19	20
Ground	H	A	A	A	A	H	A	H	A	A	H	H	A	H	A	H	A	H	A	A
Result	W	D	L	L	W	W	L	L	W	D	W	D	W	W	W	L	L	L	D	W
Position	6	6	9	2	4	5	6	6	3	3	3	4	4	3	3	4	4	4	4	5

Source: See Results
A = Away; H = Home; W = Win; D = Draw; L = Loss

==== Results ====
7 March 2020 1	Ordabasy	1 – 0	Okzhetpes	Shymkent
15:00 (UTC+6)	Brígido 57'	Report	Dmitrijev (yellow card) 53'	Stadium: Namys Stadium; Attendance: 3,800; Referee: Denis Izmailov

11 March 2020 18	Astana	1 – 1	Ordabasy	Almaty
14:00 (UTC+6)	Malyi (yellow card) 49'; Rukavina (yellow card) 59'; Shchotkin 84'	Report	Khizhnichenko 38'; Bystrov (yellow card) 61'; Simčević (yellow card) 90+6'	Stadium: Zhas Kyran Stadium; Attendance: 1,200; Referee: Grigory Moskovchenko
Note: Match played at the Zhas Kyran Stadium in Almaty, due to repair work being carried out at the Astana Arena in Nur-Sultan.

15 March 2020 2	Taraz	3 – 2	Ordabasy	Taraz
16:00 (UTC+6)	Simčević 4' (o.g.); Kleshchenko 33' (o.g.); A.Taubay 47'; Mishchenko (yellow card) 57' (red card) 68'; Silva (yellow card) 74'; D.Babakhanov (yellow card) 84'	Report	Diakate 55' (pen.), 69' (pen.); Simčević (yellow card) 81'; Fontanello (yellow card) 90'	Stadium: Central Stadium; Attendance: 0 Referee: Aleksandr Gauzer
Note: Match played behind closed doors due to the COVID-19 pandemic.

1 July 2020 3	Ordabasy	0 – 1	Shakhter Karagandy	Shymkent
20:00 (UTC+6)	Diakate (red card) 74'	Report	Turysbek (yellow card) 30'; Manzorro (yellow card) 50' (yellow-red card) 80' (goal) 65'; Zenjov (yellow card) 74'; Yatchenko (yellow card) 90+2'	Stadium: Kazhymukan Munaitpasov Stadium; Attendance: 0 Referee: Georgiy Chekhovskiy
Note: Match originally scheduled for 21 March, but postponed on 16 March due to the COVID-19 pandemic.

18 August 2020 4	Zhetysu	2 – 3	Ordabasy	Almaty
19:00 (UTC+6)	Eugénio 22'; Toshev 28'; Kuantayev (yellow card) 36'; Mawutor (yellow card) 38'	Report	Khizhnichenko (yellow card) 14' (goal) 54'; Fontanello (yellow card) 34'; Simčević 39'; Mahlangu (yellow card) 50'; João Paulo 63'; B.Shayzada (yellow card) 90+2'	Stadium: Central Stadium; Attendance: 0 Referee: Artyom Kuchin
Note: Match originally scheduled for 3 April and then 4 July, but postponed twice due to the COVID-19 pandemic. Match played at the Central Stadium in Almaty, instead of Zhetysu's regular Zhetysu Stadium in Taldıqorğan. Match played behind closed doors due to the COVID-19 pandemic.

21 August 2020 5	Ordabasy	1 – 0	Caspiy	Almaty
17:00 (UTC+6)	João Paulo 44'; Mehanović (yellow card) 82'; B.Shayzada (yellow card) 90+3'	Report	A.Nabikhanov (yellow card) 5'; Sebaihi (yellow card) 54'; R.Rozybakiev (yellow card) 67'; Čubrilo (yellow card) 74'	Stadium: Stadïon Akademïï T.S.Segïzbaeva; Attendance: 0 Referee: Bagdat Abdullaev
Note: Match originally scheduled for 11 April and then 10 July, but postponed twice due to the COVID-19 pandemic. Match played at the Stadïon Akademïï T.S.Segïzbaeva in Almaty, instead of Ordabasy's regular Kazhymukan Munaitpasov Stadium in Shymkent. Match played behind closed doors due to the COVID-19 pandemic.

30 August 2020 7	Ordabasy	1 – 3	Kairat	Talgar
16:00 (UTC+6)	João Paulo 34'; Simčević (yellow card) 38'	Report	Vágner Love 17', 22'; Aimbetov 40'; Alip (yellow card) 45'; Kosović (yellow card) 72'; Góralski (yellow card) 74'; Suyumbayev (yellow card) 86'; Pokatilov (yellow card) 87'	Stadium: UTB Talgar; Attendance: 0 Referee: Timur Kumashev
Note: Match played at the UTB Talgar stadium in Talgar, instead of Ordabasy's regular Kazhymukan Munaitpasov Stadium in Shymkent. Match played behind closed doors due to the COVID-19 pandemic.

12 September 2020 8	Ordabasy	1 – 2	Astana	Talgar
15:00 (UTC+6)	João Paulo (yellow card) 21' (goal) 70'; Fontanello (yellow card) 36'; Dosmagambetov (yellow card) 78'	Report	Sigurjónsson 57' (pen.), 64' (pen.); Logvinenko (yellow card) 90+2'	Stadium: UTB Talgar Stadium; Attendance: 0 Referee: Anatolyi Vishnichenko
Note: Match played at the UTB Talgar Stadium in Talgar, instead of Ordabasy's regular Kazhymukan Munaitpasov Stadium in Shymkent. Match played behind closed doors due to the COVID-19 pandemic.

16 September 2020 6	Tobol	0 – 4	Ordabasy	Almaty
16:00 (UTC+6)	Muzhikov (yellow card) 80'	Report	Brígido 20'; João Paulo 61'; Badibanga 88'; Zhangylyshbay 90+2' (yellow card) 90+3'	Stadium: Jas Qyran Stadium; Attendance: 0 Referee: Artyom Kuchin
Note: Match played at the Jas Qyran Stadium in Almaty, instead of Tobol's regular Central Stadium in Kostanay. Match played behind closed doors due to the COVID-19 pandemic.

20 September 2020 9	Kaisar	1 – 1	Ordabasy	Almaty
18:00 (UTC+6)	Reginaldo 55'; Marochkin (yellow card) 57'; Fortes (yellow card) 70'; I.Amirseitov (yellow card) 71'; E.Altynbekov (yellow card) 90+6'	Report	João Paulo 25'; Badibanga (yellow card) 35'; Astanov (yellow card) 90+3'	Stadium: Central Stadium; Attendance: 0 Referee: Bakhyt Kyzylbaev
Note: Match played at the Central Stadium in Almaty, instead of Kaisar's regular Gani Muratbayev Stadium in Kyzylorda. Match played behind closed doors due to the COVID-19 pandemic.

24 September 2020 10	Ordabasy	1 – 0	Kyzylzhar	Talgar
15:45 (UTC+6)	Diakate (yellow card) 41'; João Paulo 72'	Report	A.Sokolenko (yellow card) 86'	Stadium: UTB Talgar; Attendance: 0 Referee: Daniyar Sakhi
Note: Match played at the UTB Talgar stadium in Talgar, instead of Ordabasy's regular Kazhymukan Munaitpasov Stadium in Shymkent. Match played behind closed doors due to the COVID-19 pandemic.

2 October 2020 11	Ordabasy	1 – 1	Taraz	Talgar
15:45 (UTC+6)	Dosmagambetov (yellow card) 37'; Dmitrenko 77' (yellow card) 89'	Report	Brkić (yellow card) 28' (goal) 56'; Karshakevich (yellow card) 36'; Silva (yellow card) 41'; B.Shadmanov (yellow card) 64'; Punoševac (yellow card) 72'	Stadium: UTB Talgar; Attendance: 0 Referee: Aydin Rakhimbayev
Note: Match played at the UTB Talgar stadium in Talgar, instead of Ordabasy's regular Kazhymukan Munaitpasov Stadium in Shymkent. Match played behind closed doors due to the COVID-19 pandemic.

18 October 2020 13	Shakhter Karagandy	0 – 1	Ordabasy	Almaty
14:00 (UTC+6)	Lamanje (yellow card) 68'	Report	João Paulo 74'; Dmitrenko (yellow card) 75'	Stadium: T.S.Segïzbaeva Academy Stadium; Attendance: 0 Referee: Bakhyt Kyzylbaev
Note: Match played at the T.S.Segïzbaeva Academy Stadium in Almaty, instead of Shakhter Karagandy's regular Shakhter Stadium in Karaganda. Match played behind closed doors due to the COVID-19 pandemic.

22 October 2020 14	Ordabasy	3 – 1	Zhetysu	Talgar
15:00 (UTC+6)	Fontanello 7' (yellow card) 49'; Diakate 18'; Dmitrenko (yellow card) 45+2'; Brígido 66'; Astanov (yellow card) 85'	Report	Naumov (yellow card) 21'; Zhaksylykov 73'	Stadium: UTB Talgar Stadium; Attendance: 0 Referee: Aleksandr Gauzer
Note: Match played at the UTB Talgar Stadium in Talgar, instead of Ordabasy's regular Kazhymukan Munaitpasov Stadium in Shymkent. Match played behind closed doors due to the COVID-19 pandemic.

26 October 2020 15	Caspiy	1 – 2	Ordabasy	Almaty
18:00 (UTC+6)	R.Sakhalbaev 23'; A.Nabikhanov (yellow card) 28'; Nurgaliyev (yellow card) 57'	Report	João Paulo 50', 61' (yellow card) 64'; Brígido (yellow card) 57'	Stadium: Jas Qyran Stadium; Attendance: 0 Referee: Saken Bayimbet
Note: Match played at the Jas Qyran Stadium in Almaty, instead of Caspiy's regular Karasai Stadium in Petropavl. Match played behind closed doors due to the COVID-19 pandemic.

30 October 2020 16	Ordabasy	0 – 3	Tobol	Almaty
14:00 (UTC+6)	Dmitrenko (yellow card) 59'; Badibanga (yellow card) 83'	Report	Amanović (yellow card) 26'; Yerlanov (yellow card) 36'; S.Zharynbetov (yellow card) 39'; Malyi (yellow card) 45+2'; Valiullin 48'; Dmitrenko 57' (o.g.); Kankava (yellow card) 61'; Sebai 64'	Stadium: T.S.Segïzbaeva Academy Stadium; Attendance: 0 Referee: Artyom Kuchin
Note: Match played at the T.S.Segïzbaeva Academy Stadium in Almaty, instead of Shakhter Karagandy's regular Shakhter Stadium in Karaganda. Match played behind closed doors due to the COVID-19 pandemic.

3 November 2020 17	Kairat	3 – 1	Ordabasy	Almaty
15:00 (UTC+6)	Vágner Love 36' (yellow card) 78'; Alip 39' (pen.); Góralski (yellow card) 75'; U.Zhaksybaev 80' (o.g.); Tungyshbayev (yellow card) 87'; Pokatilov (yellow card) 88'	Report	Badibanga (yellow card) 31'; Mehanović (yellow card) 65'; U.Zhaksybaev (yellow card) 68'; João Paulo 77'; Diakate (yellow card) 84'	Stadium: Central Stadium; Attendance: 0 Referee: Denis Tevyashov
Note: Match played behind closed doors due to the COVID-19 pandemic.

21 November 2020 19	Ordabasy	0 – 3	Kaisar	Almaty
14:00 (UTC+6)	Dmitrenko (yellow card) 29'; Dosmagambetov (red card) 65'; Diakate (yellow card) 85'	Report	Graf (yellow card) 17' (goal) 52'; I.Amirseitov (yellow card) 26'; Narzildaev (yellow card) 39'; Bitang (yellow card) 65'; Tagybergen 69', 75'; Stanisavljević (yellow card) 85'	Stadium: T.S.Segïzbaeva Academy Stadium; Attendance: 0 Referee: Bolat Saryev
Note: Match played at the T.S.Segïzbaeva Academy Stadium in Almaty, instead of Ordabasy's regular Kazhymukan Munaitpasov Stadium in Shymkent. Match played behind closed doors due to the COVID-19 pandemic.

24 November 2020 20	Kyzylzhar	0 – 0	Ordabasy	Talgar
14:00 (UTC+6)	V.Gunchenko (yellow card) 66'	Report	Kleshchenko (yellow card) 83'	Stadium: UTB Talgar; Attendance: 0 Referee: Ruslan Omarov
Note: Match played at the Central Stadium in Almaty, instead of Kyzylzhar's regular Karasai Stadium in Petropavl. Match played behind closed doors due to the COVID-19 pandemic.

30 November 2020 22	Okzhetpes	1 – 3	Ordabasy	Almaty
13:00 (UTC+6)	A.Saparov (yellow card) 21'; Bondarenko 39'; T.Zhakupov (yellow card) 62'; N.Idrisov (yellow card) 78'; Abubakar (red card) 87'	Report	Khizhnichenko 4'; Dmitrenko (yellow card) 36'; Badibanga (yellow card) 41' (goal) 56'; João Paulo (yellow card) 44' (goal) 90+3'	Stadium: Central Stadium; Attendance: 0 Referee: Anatolyi Vishnichenko
Note: Match played at the Jas Qyran Stadium in Almaty, instead of Okzhetpes's regular Okzhetpes Stadium in Kokshetau. Match played behind closed doors due to the COVID-19 pandemic.

==== League table ====
Pos	Team	Pld	W	D	L	GF	GA	GD	Pts	Qualification or relegation
3	Astana	20	11	3	6	32	21	+11	36	Qualification for the Europa Conference League second qualifying round
4	Shakhter Karagandy	20	9	5	6	29	22	+7	32	Qualification for the Europa Conference League second qualifying round
5	Ordabasy	20	9	4	7	27	26	+1	31	
6	Zhetysu	20	9	1	10	27	28	−1	28	
7	Kaisar	20	6	6	8	20	23	−3	24	

Source: UEFA, Soccerway
Rules for classification: 1) Points; 2) Goal difference; 3) Matches won; 4) Goals scored; 5) Away goals scored; 6) Head-to-head points; 7) Head-to-head matches won; 8) Head-to-head goal difference; 9) Head-to-head goals scored; 10) Head-to-head away goals scored; 11) Draw.

=== Kazakhstan Cup ===
July 2020 Last 16	–
(UTC+6)

=== UEFA Europa League ===
==== Qualifying rounds ====
27 August 2020 First qualifying round	Ordabasy (Kazakhstan)	1 – 2	(Romania) Botoșani	Shymkent, Kazakhstan
20:00 (UTC+6)	Mahlangu 31'; Diakate (yellow card) 37'; João Paulo (yellow card) 45+2'	Report	Ofosu (yellow card) 10'; Holzmann 25' (yellow card) 43'; Dugandžić 33'; Florescu (yellow card) 80'; Mendoza (yellow card) 83'; Pap (yellow card) 86'	Stadium: Kazhymukan Munaitpasov Stadium; Attendance: 0 Referee: Rauf Jabarov (Azerbaijan)
Note: Match played behind closed doors due to the COVID-19 pandemic in Europe.

== Squad statistics ==
As of match played 30 November 2020

=== Appearances and goals ===
No.	Pos	Nat	Player	Total		Premier League		Kazakhstan Cup		Europa League	
No.	Pos	Nat	Player	Apps	Goals	Apps	Goals	Apps	Goals	Apps	Goals
1	GK	(Kazakhstan) KAZ	Bekkhan Shayzada	9	0	8	0	0	0	1	0
4	DF	(Kazakhstan) KAZ	Viktor Dmitrenko	13	1	10+2	1	0	0	1	0
5	DF	(Kazakhstan) KAZ	Damir Dautov	10	0	9	0	0	0	1	0
6	DF	(Kazakhstan) KAZ	Ular Zhaksybaev	7	0	0+7	0	0	0	0	0
7	MF	(South Africa) RSA	May Mahlangu	20	1	14+5	0	0	0	1	1
10	MF	(Bosnia and Herzegovina) BIH	Mirzad Mehanović	14	0	7+6	0	0	0	0+1	0
11	MF	(Portugal) POR	Rúben Brígido	21	3	15+5	3	0	0	1	0
14	MF	(Kazakhstan) KAZ	Samat Shamshi	3	0	0+3	0	0	0	0	0
17	DF	(Kazakhstan) KAZ	Mardan Tolebek	6	0	4+2	0	0	0	0	0
18	MF	(Kazakhstan) KAZ	Maksim Vaganov	1	0	0+1	0	0	0	0	0
20	FW	(Kazakhstan) KAZ	Toktar Zhangylyshbay	16	1	3+12	1	0	0	0+1	0
22	MF	(Senegal) SEN	Abdoulaye Diakate	19	3	18	3	0	0	1	0
24	DF	(Russia) RUS	Aleksandr Kleshchenko	15	0	14+1	0	0	0	0	0
27	MF	(Kazakhstan) KAZ	Timur Dosmagambetov	19	0	18	0	0	0	1	0
28	MF	(Kazakhstan) KAZ	Asludin Khadzhiev	11	0	6+5	0	0	0	0	0
29	DF	(Argentina) ARG	Pablo Fontanello	18	1	17	1	0	0	1	0
33	MF	(Kazakhstan) KAZ	Elkhan Astanov	11	0	3+8	0	0	0	0	0
37	FW	(Brazil) BRA	João Paulo	21	12	19+1	12	0	0	1	0
39	FW	(Belgium) BEL	Ziguy Badibanga	20	2	16+3	2	0	0	1	0
72	DF	(Kazakhstan) KAZ	Andrey Shabaev	2	0	1+1	0	0	0	0	0
86	GK	(Kazakhstan) KAZ	Vladimir Plotnikov	12	0	12	0	0	0	0	0
87	DF	(Serbia) SRB	Aleksandar Simčević	12	1	10+1	1	0	0	0+1	0
91	FW	(Kazakhstan) KAZ	Sergei Khizhnichenko	20	3	12+7	3	0	0	1	0
Players away from Ordabasy on loan:
Players who left Ordabasy during the season:
19	DF	(Kazakhstan) KAZ	Marat Bystrov	4	0	4	0	0	0	0	0

=== Goal scorers ===
Place	Position	Nation	Number	Name	Premier League	Kazakhstan Cup	Europa League	Total
1	FW	(Brazil)	37	João Paulo	12	0	0	12
2	MF	(Senegal)	22	Abdoulaye Diakate	3	0	0	3
2	MF	(Portugal)	11	Rúben Brígido	3	0	0	3
2	FW	(Kazakhstan)	91	Sergei Khizhnichenko	3	0	0	3
5	FW	(Belgium)	39	Ziguy Badibanga	2	0	0	2
6	DF	(Serbia)	87	Aleksandar Simčević	1	0	0	1
6	FW	(Kazakhstan)	20	Toktar Zhangylyshbay	1	0	0	1
6	DF	(Kazakhstan)	4	Viktor Dmitrenko	1	0	0	1
6	DF	(Argentina)	29	Pablo Fontanello	1	0	0	1
6	MF	(South Africa)	7	May Mahlangu	0	0	1	1
				TOTALS	27	0	1	28

=== Clean sheets ===
Place	Position	Nation	Number	Name	Premier League	Kazakhstan Cup	Europa League	Total
1	GK	(Kazakhstan)	86	Vladimir Plotnikov	4	0	0	4
2	GK	(Kazakhstan)	1	Bekkhan Shayzada	3	0	0	3
				TOTALS	7	0	0	7

=== Disciplinary record ===
Number	Nation	Position	Name	Premier League		Kazakhstan Cup		Europa League		Total	
Number	Nation	Position	Name	Yellow card	Red card	Yellow card	Red card	Yellow card	Red card	Yellow card	Red card
1	(Kazakhstan)	GK	Bekkhan Shayzada	2	0	0	0	0	0	2	0
4	(Kazakhstan)	DF	Viktor Dmitrenko	5	0	0	0	0	0	5	0
6	(Kazakhstan)	DF	Ular Zhaksybaev	1	0	0	0	0	0	1	0
7	(South Africa)	MF	May Mahlangu	2	0	0	0	0	0	2	0
10	(Bosnia and Herzegovina)	MF	Mirzad Mehanović	2	0	0	0	0	0	2	0
11	(Portugal)	MF	Rúben Brígido	1	0	0	0	0	0	1	0
20	(Kazakhstan)	FW	Toktar Zhangylyshbay	1	0	0	0	0	0	1	0
22	(Senegal)	MF	Abdoulaye Diakate	3	1	0	0	1	0	4	1
24	(Russia)	DF	Aleksandr Kleshchenko	1	0	0	0	0	0	1	0
27	(Kazakhstan)	MF	Timur Dosmagambetov	2	1	0	0	0	0	2	1
29	(Argentina)	DF	Pablo Fontanello	4	0	0	0	0	0	4	0
33	(Kazakhstan)	MF	Elkhan Astanov	2	0	0	0	0	0	2	0
37	(Brazil)	FW	João Paulo	3	0	0	0	1	0	4	0
39	(Belgium)	FW	Ziguy Badibanga	4	0	0	0	0	0	4	0
87	(Serbia)	DF	Aleksandar Simčević	3	0	0	0	0	0	3	0
91	(Kazakhstan)	FW	Sergei Khizhnichenko	1	0	0	0	0	0	1	0
Players away on loan:
Players who left Ordabasy during the season:
19	(Kazakhstan)	DF	Marat Bystrov	1	0	0	0	0	0	1	0
			TOTALS	38	2	0	0	2	0	40	2
