= 2019 FC Ordabasy season =

FC Ordabasy
2019 season
- Chairman: Kaysar Abdraymov
- Manager: Kakhaber Tskhadadze
- Stadium: Kazhymukan Munaitpasov Stadium
- Premier League: 3rd
- Kazakhstan Cup: Semifinal
- Europa League: Second qualifying round
- Top goalscorer: League: João Paulo (15); All: João Paulo (15)
Home colours	Away colours

The 2019 FC Ordabasy season was the 17th successive season that the club played in the Kazakhstan Premier League, the highest tier of association football in Kazakhstan. Ordabasy finished the season in 3rd place, reached the Semifinal of the Kazakhstan Cup and were knocked out of the Europa League at the Second qualifying round stage by Mladá Boleslav.

== Season events ==
=== New Contracts ===
On 13 January, Timur Dosmagambetov signed a new contract with Ordabasy.

== Squad ==
As of match played 10 November 2019

No.	Name	Nationality	Position	Date of birth (age)	Signed from	Signed in	Contract ends	Apps.	Goals
Goalkeepers
1	Bekkhan Shayzada	(Kazakhstan)	GK	28 February 1998 (aged 21)	Youth Team	2016		9	0
12	Dmytro Nepohodov	(Kazakhstan)	GK	17 February 1988 (aged 31)	loan from Astana	2019	2019	37	0
Defenders
5	Damir Dautov	(Kazakhstan)	DF	3 March 1990 (aged 29)	Irtysh Pavlodar	2018		30	0
6	Ular Zhaksybaev	(Kazakhstan)	DF	20 October 1994 (aged 25)	Youth Team	2015		21	0
8	Temirlan Erlanov	(Kazakhstan)	DF	9 July 1993 (aged 26)	Vostok	2016		81	10
19	Marat Bystrov	(Russia)	DF	19 June 1992 (aged 27)	loan from Astana	2019	2019	31	0
25	Serhiy Malyi	(Kazakhstan)	DF	5 June 1990 (aged 29)	loan from Astana	2019	2019	37	1
29	Pablo Fontanello	(Argentina)	DF	25 February 1984 (aged 35)	Ural Yekaterinburg	2017		102	4
77	Talgat Adyrbekov	(Kazakhstan)	DF	26 January 1989 (aged 30)	Okzhetpes	2018		3	0
Midfielders
3	Valeri Korobkin	(Kazakhstan)	MF	2 July 1984 (aged 35)	Kaisar	2019		10	0
7	May Mahlangu	(South Africa)	MF	1 May 1989 (aged 30)	loan from Ludogorets Razgrad	2019	2019	35	3
10	Mirzad Mehanović	(Bosnia and Herzegovina)	MF	5 January 1993 (aged 26)	loan from Fastav Zlín	2018	2019	47	6
11	Kyrylo Kovalchuk	(Ukraine)	MF	11 June 1986 (aged 33)	Tom Tomsk	2017		92	5
14	Samat Shamshi	(Kazakhstan)	MF	5 December 1996 (aged 22)	Kyran	2018		38	0
17	Mardan Tolebek	(Kazakhstan)	MF	18 December 1990 (aged 28)	Youth Team	2010		164	13
21	Mukhit Zhaksylyk	(Kazakhstan)	MF	6 February 1999 (aged 20)	Youth Team	2018		0	0
22	Abdoulaye Diakate	(Senegal)	MF	16 January 1988 (aged 31)	Atyrau	2016		168	21
23	Adilkhan Dobay	(Kazakhstan)	MF	2 June 2002 (aged 17)	Youth Team	2019		2	0
27	Timur Dosmagambetov	(Kazakhstan)	MF	1 May 1989 (aged 30)	Okzhetpes	2018		70	5
28	Asludin Khadzhiev	(Kazakhstan)	MF	24 October 2000 (aged 19)	Youth Team	2019		4	0
33	Elkhan Astanov	(Kazakhstan)	MF	21 May 2000 (aged 19)	Youth Team	2019		4	0
Forwards
9	Vitali Li	(Kazakhstan)	FW	13 March 1994 (aged 25)	Atyrau	2017		32	3
18	Maksim Vaganov	(Kazakhstan)	FW	8 August 2000 (aged 19)	Youth Team	2019		3	1
20	Toktar Zhangylyshbay	(Kazakhstan)	FW	25 May 1993 (aged 26)	Tobol	2019		46	8
37	João Paulo	(Brazil)	FW	2 June 1988 (aged 31)	loan from Ludogorets Razgrad	2019	2019	37	15
39	Ziguy Badibanga	(Belgium)	FW	26 November 1991 (aged 27)	Sheriff Tiraspol	2019		31	4
88	Madihan Aitbaev	(Kazakhstan)	FW			2019		0	0
99	Aleksey Shchotkin	(Kazakhstan)	FW	21 May 1991 (aged 28)	loan from Astana	2019	2019	30	8
Players away on loan
Left during the season

== Transfers ==
=== In ===
Date	Position	Nationality	Name	From	Fee	Ref.
4 April 2019	FW	(Belgium)	Ziguy Badibanga	Sheriff Tiraspol	Free	
	MF	(Kazakhstan)	Valeri Korobkin	Kaisar	Undisclosed	
	FW	(Kazakhstan)	Toktar Zhangylyshbay	Tobol	Undisclosed	

=== Loans in ===
Date from	Position	Nationality	Name	From	Date to	Ref.
Summer 2018	MF	(Bosnia and Herzegovina)	Mirzad Mehanović	Fastav Zlín	End of Season	
14 January 2019	GK	(Kazakhstan)	Dmytro Nepohodov	Astana	End of Season	
14 January 2019	DF	(Russia)	Marat Bystrov	Astana	End of Season	
14 January 2019	FW	(Kazakhstan)	Aleksey Shchotkin	Astana	End of Season	
17 February 2018	DF	(Kazakhstan)	Serhiy Malyi	Astana	End of Season	
17 February 2019	MF	(South Africa)	May Mahlangu	Ludogorets Razgrad	End of Season	
17 February 2019	FW	(Brazil)	João Paulo	Ludogorets Razgrad	End of Season	

=== Released ===
Date	Position	Nationality	Name	Joined	Date	Ref.
31 December 2020	DF	(Kazakhstan)	Temirlan Yerlanov	Tobol	5 January 2020	
31 December 2020	MF	(Kazakhstan)	Adilkhan Dobay			
31 December 2020	MF	(Kazakhstan)	Valeri Korobkin			
31 December 2020	MF	(Kazakhstan)	Mukhit Zhaksylyk			
31 December 2020	MF	(Ukraine)	Kyrylo Kovalchuk	Retired		
31 December 2020	FW	(Kazakhstan)	Vitali Li			

== Friendlies ==
14 February 2019	Ordabasy (Kazakhstan)	1 – 2	(Ukraine) Lviv	Antalya, Turkey
(UTC+6)	Trialist	Report	Goal

17 February 2019	Ordabasy (Kazakhstan)	3 – 1	(Russia) Armavir	Antalya, Turkey
(UTC+6)	Fontanello; Diakate	Report	Goal

19 February 2019	Ordabasy (Kazakhstan)	1 – 2	(Russia) Dynamo Moscow	Antalya, Turkey
(UTC+6)	V.Li	Report	Lutsenko; Joãozinho

23 February 2019	Ordabasy (Kazakhstan)	1 – 2	(Armenia) Alashkert	Antalya, Turkey
(UTC+6)	Shchotkin	Report	Goal

24 February 2019	Ordabasy (Kazakhstan)	1 – 3	(Czech Republic) Viktoria Otrokovice	Antalya, Turkey
(UTC+6)	V.Li	Report	Goal

4 March 2019	Ordabasy	4 – 1	Makhtaaral	Shymkent
(UTC+6)	João Paulo; Mehanović; Shchotkin	Report	Goal	Stadium: Kazhymukan Munaitpasov Stadium

== Competitions ==
=== Premier League ===
==== Results summary ====
Overall								Home						Away					
Pld	W	D	L	GF	GA	GD	Pts	W	D	L	GF	GA	GD	W	D	L	GF	GA	GD
33	19	8	6	52	24	+28	65	11	4	2	30	11	+19	8	4	4	22	13	+9

Last updated: 10 November 2019.
Source: See Results

==== Results by round ====
Round	1	2	3	4	5	6	7	8	9	10	11	12	13	14	15	16	17	18	19	20	21	22	23	24	25	26	27	28	29	30	31	32	33
Ground	H	H	A	H	A	A	H	A	H	A	H	A	H	A	H	H	A	H	A	H	A	A	A	H	A	H	H	A	H	A	H	A	H
Result	W	W	D	W	L	D	D	D	D	W	W	W	W	D	W	L	W	D	L	W	L	W	W	W	W	L	W	L	D	W	W	W	W
Position	3	4	4	4	4	4	4	6	6	5	4	3	3	4	3	4	3	4	4	4	4	4	4	4	4	3	4	4	4	3	4	3	3

Source: See Results
A = Away; H = Home; W = Win; D = Draw; L = Loss

==== Results ====
9 March 2019 1	Ordabasy	3 – 0	Shakhter Karagandy	Shymkent
15:00 (UTC+6)	Malyi (yellow card) 63'; João Paulo 71', 83' (yellow card) 81'; Mahlangu 78'	Report	Najaryan (yellow card) 56'	Stadium: Kazhymukan Munaitpasov Stadium; Attendance: 6,500; Referee: Aydin Rakhimbayev

15 March 2019 2	Ordabasy	1 – 0	Aktobe	Shymkent
15:00 (UTC+6)	Mehanović (yellow card) 20' (yellow-red card) 88'; Shchotkin 85' (yellow card) 86'	Report	Kukeyev (yellow card) 28'; A.Tanzharikov (yellow card) 64'; A.Azhimov (yellow card) 83'	Stadium: Kazhymukan Munaitpasov Stadium; Attendance: 3,000; Referee: Aleksandr Aliyev

31 March 2019 3	Okzhetpes	0 – 0	Ordabasy	Astana
19:00 (UTC+6)	Kislitsyn (yellow card) 65'; Zorić (yellow card) 76'; S.Zhumakhanov (yellow card) 90+2'	Report	Korobkin (yellow card) 71'; Dosmagambetov (yellow card) 76'	Stadium: Astana Arena; Attendance: 700; Referee: Bolat aryev

6 April 2019 4	Ordabasy	1 – 0	Zhetysu	Shymkent
16:00 (UTC+6)	João Paulo (yellow card) 57' (goal) 73'; Erlanov (yellow card) 85'	Report	E.Altynbekov (yellow card) 50'; Mukhutdinov (yellow card) 57'	Stadium: Kazhymukan Munaitpasov Stadium; Attendance: 5,000; Referee: Igor Chesnokov

14 April 2019 5	Astana	2 – 1	Ordabasy	Astana
19:00 (UTC+6)	Rotariu 15'; Muzhikov (yellow card) 42'; Tomasov 65' (pen.)	Report	Zhangylyshbay 44'; Erlanov (yellow card) 64'; U.Zhaksybaev (yellow card) 85'; João Paulo (yellow card) 90+3'	Stadium: Astana Arena; Attendance: 3,200; Referee: Denis Izmailov

20 April 2019 6	Kaisar	0 – 0	Ordabasy	Kyzylorda
17:00 (UTC+6)	Gorman (yellow card) 41'; Barseghyan (yellow card) 62'	Report	Mehanović (yellow card) 81'	Stadium: Gani Muratbayev Stadium; Attendance: 2,000; Referee: Grigory Moskovchenko

27 April 2019 7	Ordabasy	0 – 0	Kairat	Shymkent
17:00 (UTC+6)	Diakate (yellow card) 49'; Malyi (yellow card) 62'	Report	Vorogovskiy (yellow card) 20' (yellow-red card) 85'; Pokatilov (yellow card) 36'; R.Orazov (yellow card) 46'; Suyumbayev (yellow card) 48'; Kuat (yellow card) 62'	Stadium: Kazhymukan Munaitpasov Stadium; Attendance: 5,000; Referee: Bulat Saryev

1 May 2019 8	Tobol	1 – 1	Ordabasy	Kostanay
17:00 (UTC+6)	Gordeichuk (yellow card) 53'; Žulpa (yellow card) 65'; Nurgaliev 78'; Balayev (yellow card) 90+1'	Report	Nepohodov (yellow card) 36'; M.Tolebek (yellow card) 66'; Fontanello (yellow card) 68'; Zhangylyshbay 90+4' (yellow card) 90+4'	Stadium: Central Stadium; Attendance: 3,000; Referee: Askhat Abdanbayev

5 May 2019 9	Ordabasy	1 – 1	Atyrau	Shymkent
17:00 (UTC+6)	Fontanello 54'	Report	D.Kayralliyev (yellow card) 37'; V.Vomenko 71'; R.Ospanov (yellow card) 76'	Stadium: Kazhymukan Munaitpasov Stadium; Attendance: 2,500; Referee: Georgiy Chekhovskiy

11 May 2019 10	Irtysh Pavlodar	0 – 2	Ordabasy	Pavlodar
18:00 (UTC+6)	Cañas (yellow card) 54'; Fonseca (yellow card) 65'	Report	Zhangylyshbay 42'; João Paulo 58'	Stadium: Central Stadium; Attendance: 2,200; Referee: Sergey Gorokhovodatskiy

18 May 2019 11	Ordabasy	3 – 0	Taraz	Shymkent
18:00 (UTC+6)	Zhangylyshbay 7' (yellow card) 66'; João Paulo 24'; Mahlangu 90'	Report	M.Amirkhanov (yellow card) 31'; Lobjanidze (yellow card) 71'	Stadium: Kazhymukan Munaitpasov Stadium; Attendance: 2,500; Referee: Denis Izmailov

26 May 2019 12	Aktobe	0 – 3	Ordabasy	Aktobe
20:00 (UTC+6)	R.Sakhibov (yellow card) 43'; B.Kairov (yellow card) 71'	Report	João Paulo 7', 18'; Diakate 68'	Stadium: Central Stadium; Attendance: 7,000; Referee: Bagdat Abdullaev

31 May 2019 13	Ordabasy	3 – 0	Okzhetpes	Shymkent
18:00 (UTC+6)	João Paulo 5'; Zhangylyshbay 14', 38'; Dosmagambetov (yellow card) 44'	Report	S.Zhumakhanov (yellow card) 42'; T.Zhakupov (yellow card) 46'; Stojanović (yellow card) 71'; N.Dairov (yellow card) 81'; Kasmynin (yellow card) 87'	Stadium: Kazhymukan Munaitpasov Stadium; Attendance: 2,700; Referee: Igor Chesnokov

16 June 2019 14	Zhetysu	1 – 1	Ordabasy	Taldıqorğan
18:00 (UTC+6)	Mawutor (yellow card) 15'; Hovhannisyan 21'; M.Sapanov (yellow card) 39'; Lebedzew (yellow card) 74'	Report	João Paulo 16'; Diakate (yellow card) 25'	Stadium: Zhetysu Stadium; Attendance: 3,000; Referee: Timur Kumashev

23 June 2019 15	Ordabasy	3 – 2	Astana	Shymkent
19:00 (UTC+6)	M.Tolebek 28'; Mehanović 36' (yellow card) 56'; Malyi (yellow card) 44' (yellow-red card) 73'; Zhangylyshbay 47'	Report	Tomasov 44'; Murtazayev 74' (yellow card) 78'	Stadium: Kazhymukan Munaitpasov Stadium; Attendance: 5,500; Referee: Bolat Karlibayev

30 June 2019 16	Ordabasy	1 – 2	Kaisar	Shymkent
19:00 (UTC+6)	Zhangylyshbay 40'; João Paulo (yellow card) 41'	Report	Lamanje (yellow card) 32'; Mbombo 37' (yellow card) 86'; John (yellow card) 59'; Tagybergen (yellow card) 75'; O.Makhan (yellow card) 90+2' (goal) 90+7'	Stadium: Kazhymukan Munaitpasov Stadium; Attendance: 4,500; Referee: Aydin Rakhimbayev

5 July 2019 17	Kairat	0 – 1	Ordabasy	Almaty
19:00 (UTC+6)	Abiken (yellow card) 37'; R.Orazov (yellow card) 45+1'; Akhmetov (yellow card) 90+4'; Suyumbayev (yellow card) 90+4'; Kosović (yellow card) 90+4'	Report	Badibanga 90' (yellow card) 90'; Zhangylyshbay (yellow card) 90+4'	Stadium: Central Stadium; Attendance: 7,000; Referee: Denis Tevyashov

14 July 2019 18	Ordabasy	0 – 0	Tobol	Shymkent
20:00 (UTC+6)	Bystrov (yellow card) 37'; Erlanov (yellow card) 63'	Report	S.Zharynbetov (yellow card) 77'; Dmitrenko (yellow card) 87'	Stadium: Kazhymukan Munaitpasov Stadium; Attendance: 5,500; Referee: Denis Izmailov

21 July 2019 19	Atyrau	1 – 0	Ordabasy	Atyrau
20:00 (UTC+6)	M.Gabyshev (yellow card) 31'; I.Antipov (yellow card) 60'; Abdulavov 74'; Mansaly (yellow card) 83'	Report	Korobkin (yellow card) 22'; João Paulo (yellow card) 87'	Stadium: Munaishy Stadium; Attendance: 4,500; Referee: Aleksandr Gauzer

28 July 2019 20	Ordabasy	1 – 0	Irtysh Pavlodar	Shymkent
20:00 (UTC+6)	Diakate (yellow card) 64'; Shchotkin 75'; S.Shamshi (yellow card) 90+4'	Report	S.Sagnayev (yellow card) 17'; Stamenković (yellow card) 64'	Stadium: Kazhymukan Munaitpasov Stadium; Attendance: 5,500; Referee: Bakhyt Kyzylbaev

4 August 2019 21	Taraz	1 – 0	Ordabasy	Taraz
19:30 (UTC+6)	Nyuiadzi 7'; Gian (yellow card) 17'; M.Amirkhanov (yellow card) 51'; Elivelto (yellow card) 69'	Report	Diakate (yellow card) 32' (yellow-red card) 42'; Erlanov (yellow card) 34'; Bystrov (yellow card) 45+2'	Stadium: Central Stadium; Attendance: 4,000; Referee: Sergey Gorokhovodatskiy

11 August 2019 22	Shakhter Karagandy	1 – 2	Ordabasy	Karaganda
19:30 (UTC+6)	Nurgaliyev 59'; Baytana (yellow card) 85'	Report	Kovalchuk (yellow card) 19'; Shchotkin 30'; Mehanović 51'; Mahlangu (yellow card) 60'; M.Tolebek (yellow card) 90+2'	Stadium: Shakhter Stadium; Attendance: 7,000; Referee: Igor Chesnokov

17 August 2019 23	Okzhetpes	0 – 4	Ordabasy	Kokshetau
17:00 (UTC+6)	Zorić (yellow card) 15'; N.Dairov (yellow card) 46'; S.Zhumakhanov (yellow card) 65'	Report	Mehanović 13'; Malyi (yellow card) 26'; João Paulo 34', 55'; Bystrov (yellow card) 40'; Erlanov 68'; Nepohodov (yellow card) 75'	Stadium: Okzhetpes Stadium; Attendance: 2,200; Referee: Timur Kumashev

24 August 2019 24	Ordabasy	3 – 2	Shakhter Karagandy	Shymkent
19:00 (UTC+6)	Diakate 22' (pen.), 90+9' (pen.); Dosmagambetov (yellow card) 56'; Shchotkin 70'; M.Tolebek (yellow card) 90+3'	Report	Nurgaliyev (yellow card) 44'; Kizito 50', 59'; Baytana (yellow card) 57'; Omirtayev (yellow card) 90+6'; Y.Tarasov (red card) 90+7'	Stadium: Kazhymukan Munaitpasov Stadium; Attendance: 2,700; Referee: Bulat Saryev

31 August 2019 25	Zhetysu	0 – 1	Ordabasy	Taldıqorğan
16:00 (UTC+6)	Bekbaev (yellow card) 75'	Report	Mahlangu (yellow card) 11'; Diakate 23'; Zhangylyshbay (yellow card) 75'	Stadium: Zhetysu Stadium; Attendance: 3,000; Referee: Artyom Kuchin

15 September 2019 26	Ordabasy	0 – 2	Kaisar	Shymkent
18:00 (UTC+6)	Malyi (yellow card) 39'; Bystrov (yellow card) 40'; Diakate (yellow card) 78'	Report	Mbombo 23', 31'; Narzildaev (yellow card) 45'; Sadownichy (yellow card) 54'; Bukia (yellow card) 81'	Stadium: Kazhymukan Munaitpasov Stadium; Attendance: 4,000; Referee: Denis Tevyashov

22 September 2019 27	Ordabasy	4 – 1	Aktobe	Shymkent
18:00 (UTC+6)	Shchotkin 15'; Dosmagambetov 44'; Yerlanov 71'; M.Tolebek (yellow card) 83'; Kovalchuk 90'	Report	A.Azhimov 65'	Stadium: Kazhymukan Munaitpasov Stadium; Attendance: 3,200; Referee: Askhat Abdanbayev

29 September 2019 28	Kairat	4 – 1	Ordabasy	Almaty
19:00 (UTC+6)	Eseola 41'; Eppel 45+2', 69'; Kuat (yellow card) 68'; Dugalić (yellow card) 71'; Shvyrev 90+1'	Report	Dosmagambetov 84'	Stadium: Central Stadium; Attendance: 10,000; Referee: Bakhyt Kyzylbaev

6 October 2019 29	Ordabasy	1 – 1	Astana	Shymkent
18:00 (UTC+6)	João Paulo 51'	Report	Yerlanov 15' (o.g.); Mayewski (yellow card) 54'; Erić (yellow card) 64'; Beisebekov (yellow card) 79'	Stadium: Kazhymukan Munaitpasov Stadium; Attendance: 6,500; Referee: Bagdat Abdullaev

20 October 2019 30	Tobol	1 – 2	Ordabasy	Kostanay
14:00 (UTC+6)	Valiullin (yellow card) 13'; Nurgaliev 31'; Abilgazy (yellow card) 54'; Dmitrenko (yellow card) 60'	Report	João Paulo 37'; Badibanga 51'; Dosmagambetov (yellow card) 76'; Nepohodov (yellow card) 90'	Stadium: Central Stadium; Attendance: 2,700; Referee: Igor Chesnokov

26 October 2019 31	Ordabasy	2 – 0	Irtysh Pavlodar	Shymkent
15:00 (UTC+6)	Badibanga (yellow card) 54'; Malyi 79'; João Paulo (yellow card) 82'; Mahlangu 84'	Report	Vitas (yellow card) 50'	Stadium: Kazhymukan Munaitpasov Stadium; Attendance: 4,000; Referee: Denis Tevyashov

3 November 2019 32	Atyrau	1 – 3	Ordabasy	Atyrau
15:00 (UTC+6)	Grzelczak 12'; Alex Bruno (red card) 73'	Report	João Paulo 42'; Dosmagambetov (yellow card) 52'; Zhangylyshbay (yellow card) 73'; Shchotkin 87'; Badibanga 90+2'	Stadium: Munaishy Stadium; Attendance: 2,000; Referee: Aydin Rakhimbayev

10 November 2019 33	Ordabasy	3 – 0	Taraz	Shymkent
15:00 (UTC+6)	João Paulo 5'; Diakate 53' (pen.); D.Dautov (yellow card) 74'; Shchotkin 80'	Report	Gian (yellow card) 39'; Sarsenov (yellow card) 74'	Stadium: Kazhymukan Munaitpasov Stadium; Attendance: 5,300; Referee: Bakhyt Kyzylbaev

==== League table ====
Pos	Team	Pld	W	D	L	GF	GA	GD	Pts	Qualification or relegation
1	Astana (C)	33	22	3	8	67	28	+39	69	Qualification for the Champions League first qualifying round
2	Kairat	33	22	2	9	65	32	+33	68	Qualification for the Europa League first qualifying round
3	Ordabasy	33	19	8	6	52	24	+28	65	Qualification for the Europa League first qualifying round
4	Tobol	33	19	6	8	45	27	+18	63	
5	Zhetysu	33	16	8	9	45	25	+20	56	

Source: UEFA, Soccerway
Rules for classification: 1) Points; 2) Goal difference; 3) Matches won; 4) Goals scored; 5) Away goals scored; 6) Head-to-head points; 7) Head-to-head matches won; 8) Head-to-head goal difference; 9) Head-to-head goals scored; 10) Head-to-head away goals scored; 11) Draw.
(C) Champions

=== Kazakhstan Cup ===
10 April 2019 Last 16	Okzhetpes	0 – 1	Ordabasy	Kokshetau
15:00 (UTC+6)	S.Zhumakhanov (yellow card) 38'; Kislitsyn (yellow card) 39'; Stojanović (yellow card) 55'; Kasmynin (yellow card) 82'	Report	Vitali Li (yellow card) 23'; Erlanov (yellow card) 65' (goal) 75'	Stadium: Okzhetpes Stadium; Attendance: 2,700; Referee: Bakhyt Kyzylbaev

8 May 2019 Quarterfinal	Taraz	0 – 1	Ordabasy	Taraz
16:00 (UTC+6)	A.Suley (yellow card) 57'; Elivelto (yellow card) 80'; B.Beisenov (yellow card) 90+4'	Report	M.Vaganov 6'; Bystrov (yellow card) 59'	Stadium: Central Stadium; Attendance: 3,000; Referee: Timur Koumashev

22 May 2019 Semifinal 1st leg	Ordabasy	1 – 1	Atyrau	Shymkent
18:00 (UTC+6)	Diakate 17' (pen.); Fontanello (yellow card) 28'; D.Dautov (yellow card) 90+2'	Report	R.Ospanov (yellow card) 45+1'; Sergienko 67'; A.Shabaev (yellow card) 88'; V.Vomenko (yellow card) 90+3'	Stadium: Kazhymukan Munaitpasov Stadium; Attendance: 3,000; Referee: Bakhyt Kyzylbaev

19 June 2019 Semifinal 2nd leg	Atyrau	0 – 0 (a 1 – 1 agg.)	Ordabasy	Atyrau
19:30 (UTC+6)	D.Mazhitov (yellow card) 70'; Loginovsky (yellow card) 90+5'	Report	Nepohodov (yellow card) 82'	Stadium: Munaishy Stadium; Attendance: 6,000; Referee: Bagdat Abdullayev

=== UEFA Europa League ===
==== Qualifying rounds ====
11 July 2019 First qualifying round 1st leg	Ordabasy (Kazakhstan)	1 – 0	(Georgia (country)) Torpedo Kutaisi	Shymkent, Kazakhstan
20:00 (UTC+6)	Erlanov 67'	Report		Stadium: Kazhymukan Munaitpasov Stadium; Attendance: 15,900; Referee: Roomer Tarajev (Estonia)

18 July 2019 First qualifying round 2nd leg	Torpedo Kutaisi (Georgia (country))	0 – 2 (0 – 3 agg.)	(Kazakhstan) Ordabasy	Tbilisi, Georgia
23:00 (UTC+6)	Tsintsadze (yellow card) 23'; Z.Tsitskishvili (yellow card) 62'; T.Chogadze (yellow card) 86'	Report	Mehanović 81'; Badibanga 90+4'	Stadium: Mikheil Meskhi Stadium; Attendance: 3,753; Referee: Aristotelis Diamantopoulos (Greece)
Note: Torpedo Kutaisi played their home matches at Mikheil Meskhi Stadium, Tbilisi, instead of their regular stadium Ramaz Shengelia Stadium, Kutaisi.

26 July 2019 Second qualifying round 1st leg	Mladá Boleslav (Czech Republic)	1 – 1	(Kazakhstan) Ordabasy	Mladá Boleslav, Czech Republic
00:00 (UTC+6)	Komlichenko 45+2'	Report	Mehanović 21' (yellow card) 45'; Shchotkin (yellow card) 63'; Nepohodov (yellow card) 66'; Malyi (yellow card) 88'	Stadium: Lokotrans Aréna; Attendance: 3,721; Referee: Sergey Tsinkevich (Belarus)

1 August 2019 Second qualifying round 2nd leg	Ordabasy (Kazakhstan)	2 – 3 (3 – 4 agg.)	(Czech Republic) Mladá Boleslav	Shymkent, Kazakhstan
20:00 (UTC+6)	Mahlangu (yellow card) 32'; Malyi (yellow card) 38'; Shchotkin 45'; Diakate 56' (pen.); Zhangylyshbay (yellow card) 74'; Erlanov (yellow card) 84'; João Paulo (yellow card) 87'; Fontanello (yellow card) 89'	Report	Matějovský 8'; Komlichenko 33' (pen.); Mešanović 47' (yellow card) 55'; Takács (yellow card) 90+7'	Stadium: Kazhymukan Munaitpasov Stadium; Referee: Mads-Kristoffer Kristoffersen (Denmark)

== Squad statistics ==
As of match played 10 November 2019

=== Appearances and goals ===
No.	Pos	Nat	Player	Total		Premier League		Kazakhstan Cup		Europa League	
No.	Pos	Nat	Player	Apps	Goals	Apps	Goals	Apps	Goals	Apps	Goals
1	GK	(Kazakhstan) KAZ	Bekkhan Shayzada	4	0	4	0	0	0	0	0
3	MF	(Kazakhstan) KAZ	Valeri Korobkin	10	0	5+4	0	0+1	0	0	0
5	DF	(Kazakhstan) KAZ	Damir Dautov	16	0	12+2	0	2	0	0	0
6	DF	(Kazakhstan) KAZ	Ular Zhaksybaev	3	0	1+2	0	0	0	0	0
7	MF	(South Africa) RSA	May Mahlangu	35	3	27+2	3	2	0	4	0
8	DF	(Kazakhstan) KAZ	Temirlan Erlanov	31	4	23+2	2	2	1	4	1
9	FW	(Kazakhstan) KAZ	Vitali Li	5	0	2+2	0	1	0	0	0
10	MF	(Bosnia and Herzegovina) BIH	Mirzad Mehanović	34	5	24+3	3	2+1	0	3+1	2
11	MF	(Ukraine) UKR	Kyrylo Kovalchuk	27	1	9+13	1	2	0	1+2	0
12	GK	(Kazakhstan) KAZ	Dmytro Nepohodov	37	0	29	0	4	0	4	0
14	MF	(Kazakhstan) KAZ	Samat Shamshi	21	0	4+13	0	1+1	0	0+2	0
17	MF	(Kazakhstan) KAZ	Mardan Tolebek	16	1	11+2	1	1+1	0	1	0
18	FW	(Kazakhstan) KAZ	Maksim Vaganov	3	1	0+2	0	1	1	0	0
19	DF	(Kazakhstan) KAZ	Marat Bystrov	31	0	21+2	0	4	0	3+1	0
20	FW	(Kazakhstan) KAZ	Toktar Zhangylyshbay	37	8	21+10	8	3+1	0	1+1	0
22	MF	(Senegal) SEN	Abdoulaye Diakate	37	7	29	5	4	1	4	1
23	MF	(Kazakhstan) KAZ	Adilkhan Dobay	2	0	0+2	0	0	0	0	0
25	DF	(Kazakhstan) KAZ	Serhiy Malyi	37	1	28+1	1	4	0	4	0
27	MF	(Kazakhstan) KAZ	Timur Dosmagambetov	37	2	29	2	3+1	0	4	0
28	MF	(Kazakhstan) KAZ	Asludin Khadzhiev	4	0	1+3	0	0	0	0	0
29	DF	(Argentina) ARG	Pablo Fontanello	41	1	31+2	1	4	0	4	0
33	MF	(Kazakhstan) KAZ	Elkhan Astanov	4	0	1+2	0	0+1	0	0	0
37	FW	(Brazil) BRA	João Paulo	37	15	25+6	15	1+1	0	3+1	0
39	FW	(Belgium) BEL	Ziguy Badibanga	31	4	10+14	3	2+1	0	2+2	1
99	FW	(Kazakhstan) KAZ	Aleksey Shchotkin	30	8	16+6	7	1+3	0	2+2	1
Players away from Ordabasy on loan:
Players who left Ordabasy during the season:

=== Goal scorers ===
Place	Position	Nation	Number	Name	Premier League	Kazakhstan Cup	Europa League	Total
1	FW	(Brazil)	37	João Paulo	15	0	0	15
2	FW	(Kazakhstan)	20	Toktar Zhangylyshbay	8	0	0	8
2	FW	(Kazakhstan)	99	Aleksey Shchotkin	7	0	1	8
4	MF	(Senegal)	22	Abdoulaye Diakate	5	1	1	7
5	MF	(Bosnia and Herzegovina)	10	Mirzad Mehanović	3	0	2	5
6	FW	(Belgium)	39	Ziguy Badibanga	3	0	1	4
6	DF	(Kazakhstan)	8	Temirlan Erlanov	2	1	1	4
8	MF	(South Africa)	7	May Mahlangu	3	0	0	3
9	MF	(Kazakhstan)	27	Timur Dosmagambetov	2	0	0	2
10	DF	(Argentina)	29	Pablo Fontanello	1	0	0	1
10	MF	(Kazakhstan)	17	Mardan Tolebek	1	0	0	1
10	MF	(Ukraine)	11	Kyrylo Kovalchuk	1	0	0	1
10	DF	(Kazakhstan)	25	Serhiy Malyi	1	0	0	1
10	DF	(Kazakhstan)	18	Maksim Vaganov	0	1	0	1
				TOTALS	54	3	6	63

=== Disciplinary record ===
Number	Nation	Position	Name	Premier League		Kazakhstan Cup		Europa League		Total	
Number	Nation	Position	Name	Yellow card	Red card	Yellow card	Red card	Yellow card	Red card	Yellow card	Red card
3	(Kazakhstan)	MF	Valeri Korobkin	2	0	0	0	0	0	2	0
5	(Kazakhstan)	DF	Damir Dautov	1	0	1	0	0	0	2	0
6	(Kazakhstan)	MF	Ular Zhaksybaev	1	0	0	0	0	0	1	0
7	(South Africa)	MF	May Mahlangu	2	0	0	0	1	0	3	0
8	(Kazakhstan)	DF	Temirlan Erlanov	4	0	1	0	1	0	6	0
9	(Kazakhstan)	FW	Vitali Li	0	0	1	0	0	0	1	0
10	(Bosnia and Herzegovina)	MF	Mirzad Mehanović	4	1	0	0	1	0	5	1
11	(South Africa)	MF	Kyrylo Kovalchuk	1	0	0	0	1	0	2	0
12	(Kazakhstan)	GK	Dmytro Nepohodov	3	0	1	0	1	0	5	0
14	(Kazakhstan)	MF	Samat Shamshi	1	0	0	0	0	0	1	0
17	(Kazakhstan)	MF	Mardan Tolebek	4	0	0	0	0	0	4	0
19	(Kazakhstan)	DF	Marat Bystrov	4	0	1	0	0	0	5	0
20	(Kazakhstan)	FW	Toktar Zhangylyshbay	5	0	0	0	1	0	6	0
22	(Senegal)	MF	Abdoulaye Diakate	6	1	0	0	1	0	7	1
25	(Kazakhstan)	DF	Serhiy Malyi	6	1	0	0	2	0	8	1
27	(Kazakhstan)	MF	Timur Dosmagambetov	5	0	0	0	0	0	5	0
29	(Argentina)	DF	Pablo Fontanello	1	0	1	0	1	0	3	0
37	(Brazil)	FW	João Paulo	5	0	0	0	1	0	6	0
39	(Belgium)	FW	Ziguy Badibanga	2	0	0	0	0	0	2	0
99	(Kazakhstan)	FW	Aleksey Shchotkin	1	0	0	0	1	0	2	0
Players who left Ordabasy during the season:
			TOTALS	59	3	6	0	12	0	77	3
