= João Paulo (footballer, born June 1988) =

Brazilian footballer

Personal information
- Full name: João Paulo da Silva Araújo
- Date of birth: 2 June 1988 (age 38)
- Place of birth: Natal, Brazil
- Height: 1.70 m (5 ft 7 in)
- Positions: Winger; forward

Senior career*
Years	Team	Apps	(Gls)
2007–2008	ABC		
2008	Barras-PI		
2008–2009	Botafogo-PB		
2009–2011	ABC	34	(7)
2011	→ Gwangju FC (loan)	15	(6)
2011–2013	Gwangju FC	52	(10)
2013	→ Daejeon Citizen (loan)	35	(6)
2014–2015	Incheon United	5	(0)
2014–2015	→ ABC (loan)	20	(4)
2015	Botafogo-PB	17	(5)
2016	Ferroviária	0	(0)
2016	Botev Plovdiv	19	(12)
2017	Ludogorets Razgrad II	4	(3)
2017–2020	Ludogorets Razgrad	31	(2)
2018	→ Botev Plovdiv (loan)	11	(9)
2019	→ Ordabasy (loan)	31	(15)
2020–2021	Ordabasy	34	(20)
2021–2026	Kairat	85	(40)
- * Club domestic league appearances and goals as of 12 July 2025

João Paulo da Silva Araújo (born 2 June 1988), commonly known as João Paulo, is a Brazilian professional footballer who plays as a forward. He received Kazakhstani citizenship in 2022.

== Career ==
=== South Korea ===
On 20 February 2011, João Paulo joined South Korean K-League side Gwangju FC on loan from ABC, but signed a permanent deal five months later in July.

Following Daejeon Citizen's relegation to the K League Challenge, he joined Incheon United in January 2014.

=== Botev Plovdiv ===
On 16 June 2016, João Paulo joined Bulgarian club Botev Plovdiv, and was presented to the public alongside two fellow new Brazilian signings. On 29 June, he scored his unofficial first goal for the club, in a 5–0 thrashing over FC Oborishte in a pre-season friendly.

On 15 August 2016, João Paulo scored a goal for the 3–2 win over Slavia Sofia. On 27 August, he also scored the winning goal in a 2–1 home victory over Neftochimic Burgas.

João Paulo scored a hat-trick for the 4–0 win over FC Lokomotiv Gorna Oryahovitsa on 17 September. Four days later, on 21 September, he scored twice for the 6–3 away win over FC Pirin Gotse Delchev for the Bulgarian Cup. At the end of the same week he scored another goal for the 2–1 away win over Dunav Ruse.

On 16 October João Paulo continued his goalscoring streak during a 4–3 away win over Beroe Stara Zagora in the regional Thracian Derby. He scored a goal during the 3–0 win over PFC Neftochimic Burgas on 27 October. Three days later, during the 1–1 draw with Levski Sofia he scored a goal in the 13th second following an assist from Todor Nedelev. João Paulo scored again on 3 November during the 3–1 away defeat to PFC Montana.

=== Ludogorets Razgrad ===
On 6 January 2017, after several weeks of negotiations, Paulo joined Bulgarian champions Ludogorets Razgrad at a reported transfer fee of €150,000.

=== Return to Botev Plovdiv ===
On 27 February 2018, João Paulo returned to Botev Plovdiv on a loan until the end of the season. On 12 March, on day when Botev Plovdiv celebrated 106 years from its foundation, João Paulo scored a goal in a 4–2 away win over FC Vereya. On 21 April João Paulo scored a goal during the 2–2 draw with FC Vereya. On 29 April João Paulo scored a goal for the 2–1 home win over CSKA Sofia. A week later, on 5 May, he scored again but this time Botev Plovdiv was dramatically defeated with 3–2 by Levski Sofia. On 11 May, João Paulo scored twice for the 2–1 win over Beroe Stara Zagora and received the award for man of the match.

=== Kairat ===
On 6 July 2021, Kairat announced the signing of João Paulo from Ordabasy, on a 18-month contract.

== Career statistics ==
As of match played 10 November 2024

Appearances and goals by club, season and competition
Club	Season	League			State league (Note: Includes Campeonato Potiguar, Campeonato Paraibano, Campeonato Paulista Série A2)		National cup (Note: Includes Copa do Brasil, Bulgarian Cup, Kazakhstan Cup)		League cup (Note: Includes Korean League Cup, Kazakhstan League Cup)		Continental		Other		Total	
Club	Season	Division	Apps	Goals	Apps	Goals	Apps	Goals	Apps	Goals	Apps	Goals	Apps	Goals	Apps	Goals
Gwangju (loan)	2011	K League 1	15	6	—		0	0	3	0	—		—		18	6
Gwangju	2011	K League 1	12	3	—		0	0	—		—		—		12	3
Gwangju	2012	K League 1	40	8	—		0	0	—		—		—		40	8
Gwangju	2013	K League 1	0	0	—		0	0	—		—		—		0	0
Gwangju	Total		52	10	—		0	0	—		—		—		52	10
Daejeon Citizen (loan)	2013	K League Classic	35	6	—		0	0	—		—		—		35	6
Incheon United	2014	K League Classic	5	0	—		0	0	—		—		—		5	0
Incheon United	2015	K League Classic	0	0	—		0	0	—		—		—		0	0
Incheon United	Total		5	0	—		0	0	—		—		—		5	0
ABC (loan)	2014	Série B	20	4	0	0	6	1	—		—		—		12	3
ABC (loan)	2015	Série B	0	0	6	2	1	0	—		—		—		40	8
ABC (loan)	Total		20	4	6	2	7	1	—		—		—		33	7
Botafogo da Paraíba	2015	Série C	17	5		3	0	0	—		—		—		17	8
Ferroviária	2016		0	0	6	0	4	0	—		—		—		10	0
Botev Plovdiv	2016–17	Bulgarian First League	19	12	—		2	3	—		—		—		21	15
Ludogorets Razgrad	2016–17	Bulgarian First League	6	1	—		2	3	—		2 (Note: Appearances in UEFA Europa League)	0	—		10	4
Ludogorets Razgrad	2017–18	Bulgarian First League	14	1	—		2	0	—		5 (Note: Two appearances in UEFA Champions League, three appearances in UEFA Europa League)	0	1 (Note: Appearance in Bulgarian Supercup)	0	22	1
Ludogorets Razgrad	2018–19	Bulgarian First League	11	0	—		1	1	—		5 (Note: Two appearances in UEFA Champions League, three appearances in UEFA Europa League)	0	1	0	18	1
Ludogorets Razgrad	Total		31	2	—		5	4	—		12	0	2	0	50	6
Botev Plovdiv (loan)	2017–18	Bulgarian First League	11	9	—		2	1	—		—		—		13	10
Ordabasy (loan)	2019	Kazakhstan Premier League	31	15	—		2	0	—		4	0	—		37	15
Ordabasy	2020	Kazakhstan Premier League	20	12	—		0	0	—		1	0	—		21	12
Ordabasy	2021	Kazakhstan Premier League	14	8	—		0	0	—		—		—		14	8
Ordabasy	Total		34	20	—		0	0	—		1	0	—		35	20
Kairat	2021	Kazakhstan Premier League	5	1	—		5	0	—		4 (Note: One appearance in UEFA Champions League, three appearances in UEFA Europa Conference League)	0	0	0	14	1
Kairat	2022	Kazakhstan Premier League	26	11	—		4	2	—		2 (Note: Appearances in UEFA Europa Conference League)	0	1 (Note: Appearance in Kazakhstan Super Cup)	0	33	14
Kairat	2023	Kazakhstan Premier League	26	17	—		2	0	—		—		—		28	17
Kairat	2024	Kazakhstan Premier League	24	10	—		2	0	5	4	—		—		31	14
Kairat	Total		81	39	—		13	2	5	4	6	0	1	0	106	46
Career total			351	129	12	5	35	11	8	4	23	0	3	0	454	150

== Honours ==
Ludogorets Razgrad

- Bulgarian Supercup: 2018

Kairat

- Kazakhstan Premier League: 2024
- Kazakhstan Cup: 2021

Individual

- Kazakhstan Premier League Player of the Month: April 2023, June 2023
- Kazakhstan Premier League Top Scorer: 2020, 2023
