= Marat Bystrov =

Kazakhstani-Russian football player

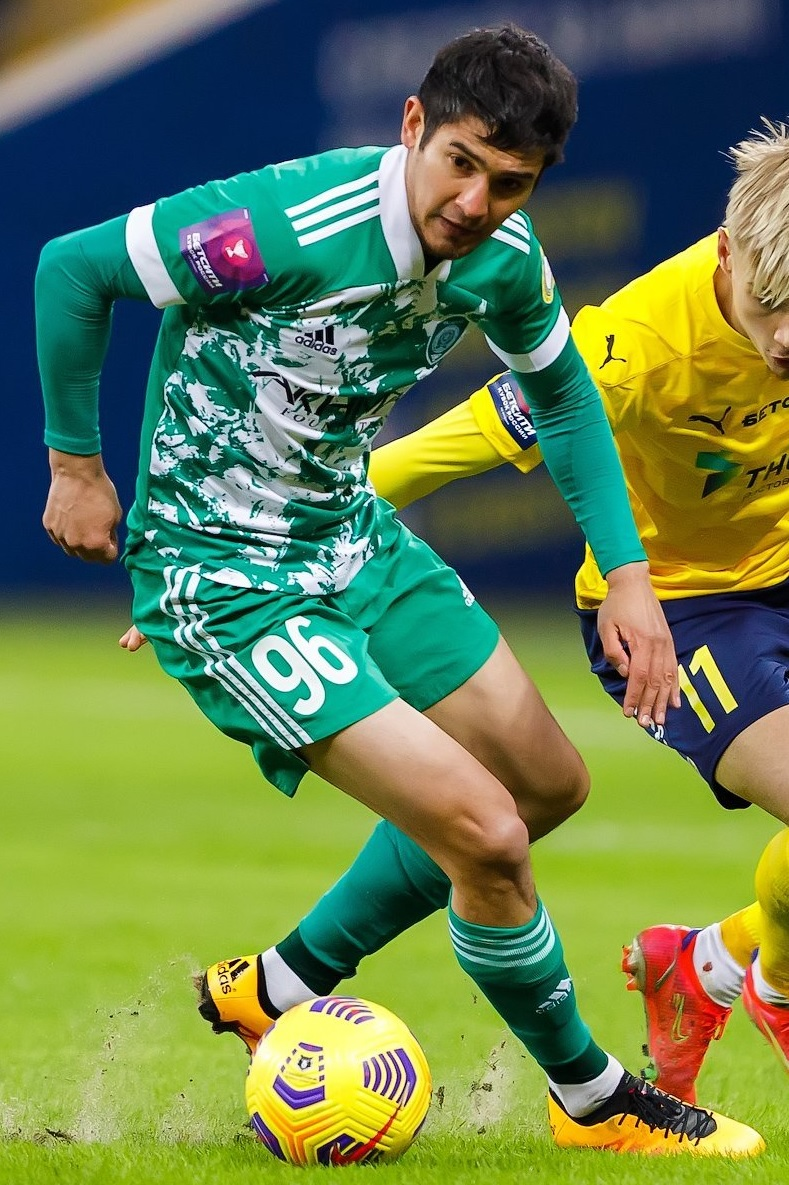
- Bystrov with Akhmat Grozny in 2021

Personal information
- Full name: Marat Vyacheslavovich Bystrov
- Date of birth: 19 June 1992 (age 34)
- Place of birth: Zhetikara, Kazakhstan
- Height: 1.81 m (5 ft 11 in)
- Positions: Centre-back; left-back

Team information
- Current team: Zhenis
- Number: 4

Senior career*
Years	Team	Apps	(Gls)
2010–2013	Magnitogorsk		
2014–2016	Chelyabinsk	64	(5)
2017–2018	Tambov	44	(0)
2018–2020	Astana	0	(0)
2018	→ Tobol (loan)	14	(1)
2019	→ Ordabasy (loan)	23	(0)
2020	Ordabasy	4	(0)
2020–2024	Akhmat Grozny	71	(0)
2024–2025	Astana	19	(0)
2026–	Zhenis	20	(0)

International career^{‡}
2019–	Kazakhstan	38	(0)
- * Club domestic league appearances and goals as of 1 November 2026 ‡ National team caps and goals as of 9 June 2025

Marat Vyacheslavovich Bystrov (Russian: Марат Вячеславович Быстров; born 19 June 1992) is a Kazakhstani football player who plays as a centre-back or left-back for Zhenis and Kazakhstan.

== Club career ==
Bystrov made his professional debut in the Russian Professional Football League for FC Chelyabinsk on 18 July 2014 in a game against FC Neftekhimik Nizhnekamsk.

On 25 June 2018, Bystrov signed a 3-year contract with FC Astana and was immediately loaned to FC Tobol until the end of 2018.

On 14 January 2019, Bystrov moved to FC Ordabasy on loan, returning to Astana in January 2020.

On 16 August 2020, Akhmat Grozny announced the signing of Bystrov to a two-year contract.

On 9 January 2024, Bystrov's contract with Akhmat was terminated by mutual consent.

On 18 January 2024, Bystrov re-signed for Astana on a one-year contract, with the option of an additional year.

On 6 January 2026, Zhenis announced the signing of Bystrov.

== International ==
On 21 February 2019, he made his debut for the Kazakhstan national football team in a friendly against Moldova.

== Personal ==
Bystrov was born to a Russian father and Kazakh mother. From 2012 to 2014 he took a break from his soccer career to serve in the Russian army.

== Career statistics ==
=== Club ===
As of match played 2 July 2026

Appearances and goals by club, season and competition
Club	Season	League			National Cup		League Cup		Continental		Other		Total	
Club	Season	Division	Apps	Goals	Apps	Goals	Apps	Goals	Apps	Goals	Apps	Goals	Apps	Goals
Chelyabinsk	2014–15	PFL	22	1	1	0	–		–		–		23	1
Chelyabinsk	2015–16	PFL	26	2	2	0	–		–		–		28	2
Chelyabinsk	2016–17	PFL	16	2	5	0	–		–		–		21	2
Chelyabinsk	Total		64	5	8	0	0	0	0	0	0	0	72	5
Tambov	2016–17	Russian FNL	14	0	0	0	–		–		4 (Note: Appearances in the FNL Cup)	0	18	0
Tambov	2017–18	Russian FNL	30	0	2	0	–		–		6 (Note: One appearance in the Russian Premier League promotion playoffs, five appearances in the FNL Cup)	0	38	0
Tambov	Total		44	0	2	0	0	0	0	0	10	0	56	0
Astana	2018	Kazakhstan Premier League	0	0	0	0	–		0 (Note: Appearances in the UEFA Champions League and UEFA Europa League)	0	0 (Note: Appearances in the Kazakhstan Super Cup)	0	0	0
Astana	2019	Kazakhstan Premier League	0	0	0	0	–		0	0	0	0	0	0
Astana	Total		0	0	0	0	0	0	0	0	0	0	0	0
Tobol (loan)	2018	Kazakhstan Premier League	14	1	0	0	–		3 (Note: Appearances in the UEFA Europa League)	0	–		17	1
Ordabasy (loan)	2019	Kazakhstan Premier League	23	0	4	0	–		4	0	–		31	0
Ordabasy	2020	Kazakhstan Premier League	4	0	0	0	–		0	0	–		4	0
Akhmat Grozny	2020–21	Russian Premier League	22	0	3	0	–		–		–		25	0
Akhmat Grozny	2021–22	Russian Premier League	26	0	1	0	–		–		–		27	0
Akhmat Grozny	2022–23	Russian Premier League	20	0	4	0	–		–		–		24	0
Akhmat Grozny	2023–24	Russian Premier League	3	0	4	0	–		–		–		7	0
Akhmat Grozny	Total		71	0	12	0	0	0	0	0	0	0	83	0
Astana	2024	Kazakhstan Premier League	15	0	1	0	4	0	4 (Note: appearances in the UEFA Conference League)	0	–		24	0
Astana	2025	Kazakhstan Premier League	4	0	2	0	–		0	0	–		6	0
Astana	Total		19	0	3	0	4	0	4	0	0	0	30	0
Zhenis	2026	Kazakhstan Premier League	13	0	1	0	–		–		–		14	0
Career total			252	6	29	0	4	0	11	0	10	0	307	6

=== International ===
As of match played 13 November 2021

Appearances and goals by national team and year
National team	Year	Apps	Goals
Kazakhstan	2019	1	0
Kazakhstan	2020	5	0
Kazakhstan	2021	7	0
Total		13	0
