= Abdoulaye Diakate =

Senegalese professional footballer

Personal information
- Full name: Abdoulaye Diakate
- Date of birth: January 16, 1988 (age 38)
- Place of birth: Guédiawaye, Senegal
- Height: 1.84 m (6 ft 1/2 in)
- Position: Midfielder

Senior career*
Years	Team	Apps	(Gls)
2008	Kartal	15	(1)
2009	Sakaryaspor	16	(2)
2009–2010	Çaykur Rizespor	22	(0)
2011–2013	Taraz	83	(11)
2014	Ordabasy	31	(2)
2015	Atyrau	24	(2)
2016–2021	Ordabasy	154	(23)
2022	Turan	22	(1)
2023	Caspiy	13	(0)
- * Club domestic league appearances and goals as of 6 July 2023

Abdoulaye Diakate (born 16 January 1988) is a Senegalese professional footballer who plays as a midfielder.

== Career ==
Diakate began his professional career began in 2008 with Turkish TFF First League side Kartal, moving to fellow First League side Sakaryaspor halfway through the season. The following season Diakate played for Çaykur Rizespor, also in the TFF First League, before leaving the club at the end of the season. Diakate's next club was Kazakhstan Premier League side FC Taraz, for whom he made 83 league appearances, before moving to Ordabasy. In February 2015, Diakate signed for FC Atyrau.

== Career statistics ==
=== Club ===
As of match played 6 November 2022

Appearances and goals by club, season and competition
Club	Season	League			National Cup		Continental		Total	
Club	Season	Division	Apps	Goals	Apps	Goals	Apps	Goals	Apps	Goals
Kartal	2008–09	TFF First League	15	1	1	0	–		16	1
Sakaryaspor	2008–09	TFF First League	16	2	0	0	–		16	2
Çaykur Rizespor	2009–10	TFF First League	22	0	1	0	–		23	0
Taraz	2011	Kazakhstan Premier League	30	1	4	0	–		34	1
Taraz	2012	Kazakhstan Premier League	26	6	2	0	–		28	6
Taraz	2013	Kazakhstan Premier League	27	4	3	0	–		30	4
Taraz	Total		83	11	9	0	-	-	92	11
Ordabasy	2014	Kazakhstan Premier League	31	2	1	0	–		33	2
Atyrau	2015	Kazakhstan Premier League	24	2	1	0	–		26	2
Ordabasy	2016	Kazakhstan Premier League	31	3	0	0	2	0	33	3
Ordabasy	2017	Kazakhstan Premier League	31	2	2	0	2	0	35	2
Ordabasy	2018	Kazakhstan Premier League	29	7	1	0	–		30	7
Ordabasy	2019	Kazakhstan Premier League	29	5	4	1	4	1	37	7
Ordabasy	2020	Kazakhstan Premier League	18	3	0	0	1	0	19	3
Ordabasy	2021	Kazakhstan Premier League	16	3	4	1	-		20	4
Ordabasy	Total		154	23	11	2	9	1	174	26
Turan	2022	Kazakhstan Premier League	22	1	4	0	–		26	1
Career total			367	41	28	2	9	1	404	44
