= Pablo Fontanello =

Argentine footballer

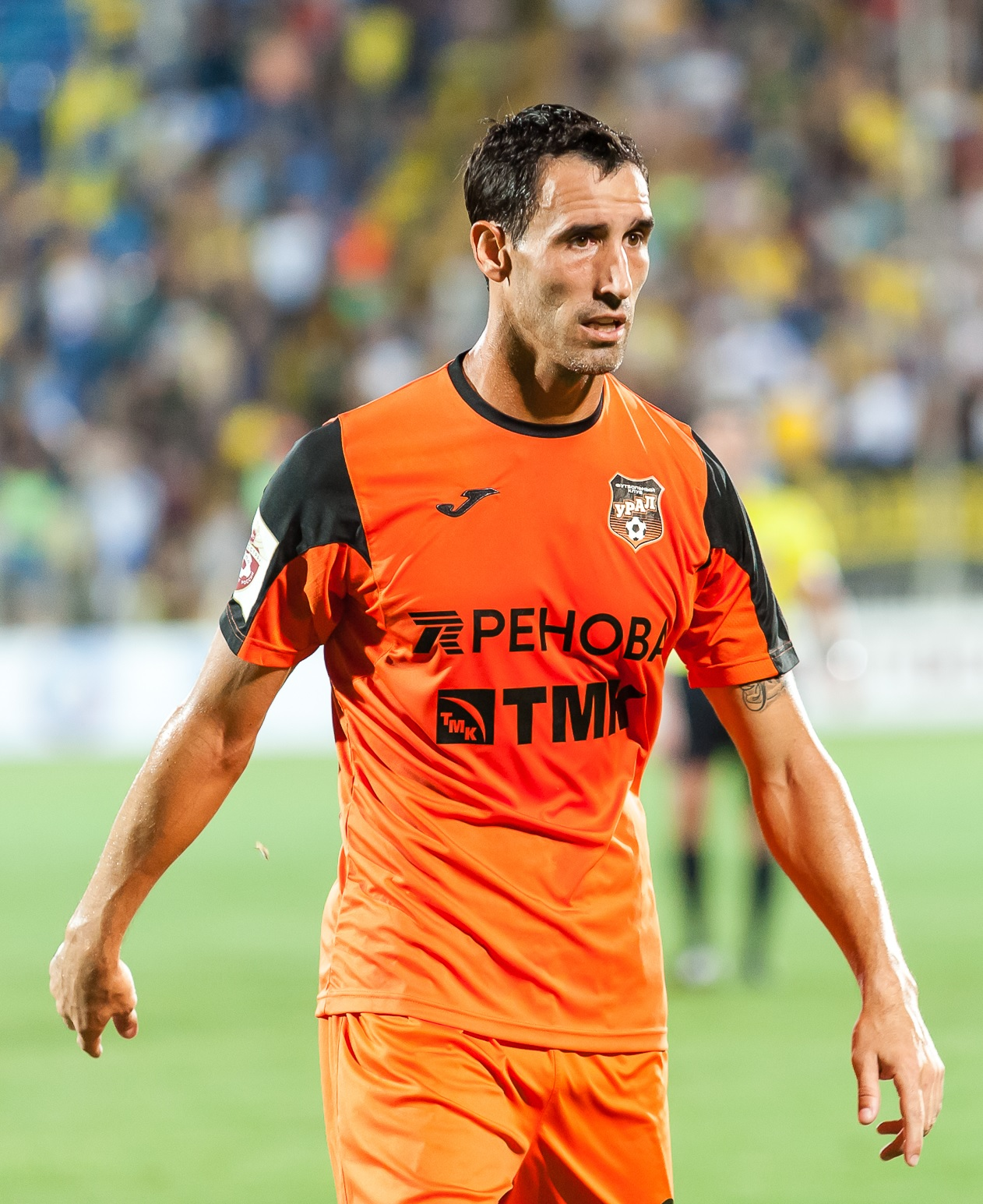
- Fontanello with Ural in 2016

Personal information
- Full name: Pablo Ezequiel Fontanello
- Date of birth: 25 February 1984 (age 42)
- Place of birth: Lincoln, Buenos Aires, Argentina
- Height: 1.91 m (6 ft 3 in)
- Position: Centre back

Youth career
- Deportivo Español

Senior career*
Years	Team	Apps	(Gls)
2003–2006	Deportivo Español	96	(8)
2006–2009	Tigre	39	(1)
2007–2008	→ Santiago Wanderers (loan)	14	(1)
2009–2011	Parma	0	(0)
2010	→ Tigre (loan)	19	(2)
2010–2011	→ Gimnasia LP (loan)	23	(0)
2011	→ Chornomorets (loan)	2	(1)
2012–2014	Chornomorets	54	(4)
2014	Stabæk	10	(1)
2014–2016	Ural	68	(6)
2017–2021	Ordabasy	121	(5)
2021–2022	Torrijos	19	(2)
2022–2023	Toledo	23	(2)
- * Club domestic league appearances and goals

Pablo Ezequiel Fontanello (born 26 September 1984) is an Argentine former footballer.

== Career ==
New player GNK Dinamo Emerged from the lower Deportivo Español, the Argentine player debuted at the club in 2003 and was there until 2006. In 2006, he moved to Tigre. In 2007, he signed for Santiago Wanderers. In 2008, he was repatriated back to Tigre

In 2009, Fontanello transferred to Parma, but returned on loan to Tigre in January 2010. In July 2010, the Argentine defender was loaned again, this time to Gimnasia y Esgrima La Plata.

In August 2011, Fontanello was loaned to Chornomorets Odesa until the end of the season.

At the start of March 2014, Fontanello left Chornomorets Odesa due to the civil unrest caused by the 2014 Ukrainian revolution, going on to sign for Stabæk in Norway at the end of the transfer window. After spending three months in Norway, Fontanello moved to Russian Premier League side Ural in June 2014. On 19 October 2014, he scored his first goal for Ural against Spartak Moscow in a 2–0 win.

In March 2017, Fontanello signed for Ordabasy in the Kazakhstan Premier League. On 4 August 2021, Fontanello left Ordabasy by mutual consent.

== Career statistics ==
=== Club ===
As of match played 1 August 2021

Appearances and goals by club, season and competition
Club	Season	League			National Cup		Continental		Other		Total	
Club	Season	Division	Apps	Goals	Apps	Goals	Apps	Goals	Apps	Goals	Apps	Goals
Parma	2009-10	Serie A	0	0	0	0	-		-		0	0
Parma	2010–11	Serie A	0	0	0	0	-		-		0	0
Parma	2011–12	Serie A	0	0	0	0	-		-		0	0
Parma	Total		0	0	0	0	-	-	-	-	0	0
Tigre (loan)	2009-10	Argentine Primera División	19	2			–		–		19	2
Gimnasia y Esgrima (loan)	2010-11	Argentine Primera División	23	0			–		–		23	0
Chornomorets Odesa (loan)	2011-12	Ukrainian Premier League	2	1	2	2	–		–		4	3
Chornomorets Odesa	2011-12	Ukrainian Premier League	8	1	0	0	-		-		8	1
Chornomorets Odesa	2012-13	Ukrainian Premier League	28	1	5	2	-		-		33	3
Chornomorets Odesa	2013-14	Ukrainian Premier League	17	2	0	0	14	0	1	0	32	2
Chornomorets Odesa	Total		53	4	5	2	14	0	1	0	73	6
Stabæk	2014	Tippeligaen	10	1	3	0	–		–		13	1
Ural	2014–15	Russian Premier League	25	2	1	0	-		2	0	28	2
Ural	2015–16	Russian Premier League	27	3	2	0	-		-		29	3
Ural	2016–17	Russian Premier League	16	1	2	0	-		-		18	1
Ural	Total		68	6	5	0	-	-	2	0	75	6
Ordabasy	2017	Kazakhstan Premier League	24	3	3	0	2	0	–		29	3
Ordabasy	2018	Kazakhstan Premier League	31	0	1	0	0	0	–		32	0
Ordabasy	2019	Kazakhstan Premier League	33	1	4	0	4	0	–		41	1
Ordabasy	2020	Kazakhstan Premier League	17	1	0	0	1	0	–		18	1
Ordabasy	2021	Kazakhstan Premier League	16	0	3	0	–		–		19	0
Ordabasy	Total		121	5	11	0	7	0	-	-	139	5
Career total			296	19	26	4	21	0	3	0	346	23
