= Aleksey Shchyotkin =

Kazakhstani footballer

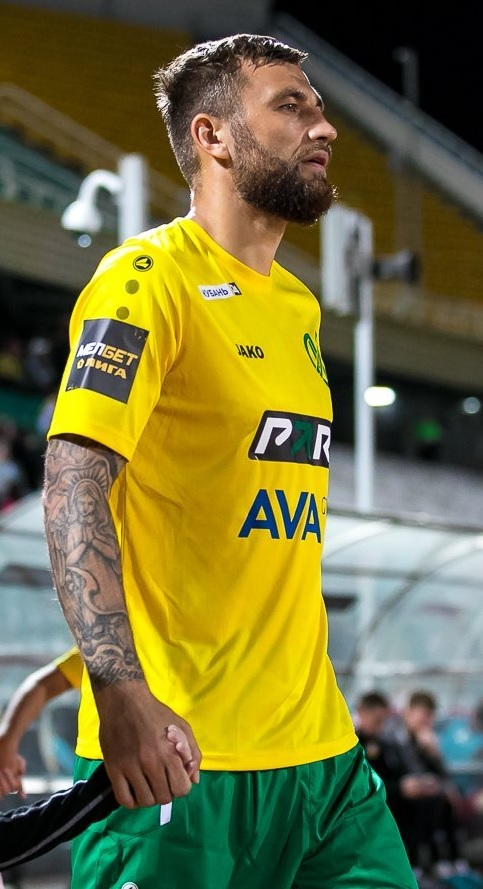
- Shchyotkin with Kuban Krasnodar in 2022

Personal information
- Full name: Aleksey Aleksandrovich Shchyotkin
- Date of birth: 21 May 1991 (age 35)
- Place of birth: Taldykorgan, Kazakh SSR, Soviet Union
- Height: 1.93 m (6 ft 4 in)
- Position: Striker

Senior career*
Years	Team	Apps	(Gls)
2010–2013	Zhetysu	84	(15)
2013–2014	Atyrau	19	(4)
2014	Taraz	24	(7)
2015–2020	Astana	76	(17)
2016	→ Aktobe (loan)	8	(6)
2017	→ Tobol (loan)	28	(10)
2019	→ Ordabasy (loan)	22	(7)
2021–2022	Rotor Volgograd	24	(6)
2022–2023	Kuban Krasnodar	22	(2)

International career^{‡}
2013–2023	Kazakhstan	39	(3)
- * Club domestic league appearances and goals as of 23 December 2025 ‡ National team caps and goals as of 23 December 2025

Aleksey Aleksandrovich Shchyotkin (Russian: Алексей Александрович Щёткин; born 21 May 1991) is a Kazakh football striker who played for the Kazakhstan national football team.

== Career ==
=== Club ===
Shchyotkin left FC Taraz in December 2014, signing a one-year contract with reigning Kazakhstan Premier League Champions FC Astana in January 2015.

In January 2017, Shchyotkin joined FC Tobol on a season-long loan deal. After playing for FC Ordabasy during the 2019 season, Shchyotkin returned to Astana in January 2020.

On 13 January 2021, he signed with Russian Premier League club Rotor Volgograd.

=== International ===
Shchyotkin made his international debut on 14 August 2013 against Georgia in a 1–0 win, playing 69 minutes from the start.

== Career statistics ==
=== Club ===
As of match played 7 May 2022

Club	Season	League			National Cup		Continental		Other		Total	
Club	Season	Division	Apps	Goals	Apps	Goals	Apps	Goals	Apps	Goals	Apps	Goals
Zhetysu	2010	Kazakhstan Premier League	22	7			–		–		22	7
Zhetysu	2011	Kazakhstan Premier League	22	5			–		–		22	5
Zhetysu	2012	Kazakhstan Premier League	26	1	4	1	2	0	–		32	2
Zhetysu	2013	Kazakhstan Premier League	14	2	0	0	–		–		14	2
Zhetysu	Total		84	15	4	1	2	0	–		90	16
Atyrau	2013	Kazakhstan Premier League	17	4	0	0	–		–		17	4
Atyrau	2014	Kazakhstan Premier League	2	0	0	0	–		–		2	0
Atyrau	Total		19	4	0	0	–		–		19	4
Taraz	2014	Kazakhstan Premier League	24	7	2	0	–		–		26	7
Astana	2015	Kazakhstan Premier League	20	3	4	1	7	0	1	0	32	4
Astana	2016	Kazakhstan Premier League	15	0	2	0	0	0	1	0	18	0
Astana	2017	Kazakhstan Premier League	0	0	0	0	0	0	0	0	0	0
Astana	2018	Kazakhstan Premier League	26	10	0	0	6	0	1	0	33	10
Astana	2019	Kazakhstan Premier League	0	0	0	0	0	0	0	0	0	0
Astana	2020	Kazakhstan Premier League	15	4	0	0	2	0	1	0	18	4
Astana	Total		76	17	6	1	15	0	4	0	101	18
Aktobe (loan)	2016	Kazakhstan Premier League	8	6	0	0	–		–		8	6
Tobol (loan)	2017	Kazakhstan Premier League	28	10	1	0	–		–		29	10
Ordabasy (loan)	2019	Kazakhstan Premier League	22	7	4	0	4	1	–		30	8
Rotor Volgograd	2020–21	Russian Premier League	5	2	0	0	–		–		5	2
Rotor Volgograd	2021–22	Russian Football National League	17	3	1	0	–		–		18	3
Rotor Volgograd	Total		22	5	1	0	-	-	-	-	23	5
Career total			283	71	18	2	21	1	4	0	326	74

=== International ===
As of match played 24 March 2022

Kazakhstan
Year	Apps	Goals
2013	5	0
2014	4	0
2015	7	1
2016	2	0
2017	3	0
2018	6	0
2019	4	2
2020	3	0
2021	4	0
2022	1	0
Total	39	3

=== International goals ===
Scores and results list Kazakhstan's goal tally first.

No.	Date	Venue	Opponent	Score	Result	Competition
1.	18 February 2015	Mardan Sports Complex, Aksu, Turkey	Moldova	1–0	1–1	Friendly
2.	6 September 2019	GSP Stadium, Nicosia, Cyprus	Cyprus	1–0	1–1	UEFA Euro 2020 qualification
3.	16 November 2019	San Marino Stadium, Serravalle, San Marino	San Marino	3–0	3–1	UEFA Euro 2020 qualification

== Honours ==
=== Club ===
Astana

- Kazakhstan Super Cup (1): 2015
