= Temirlan Yerlanov =

Kazakhstani footballer (born 1993)

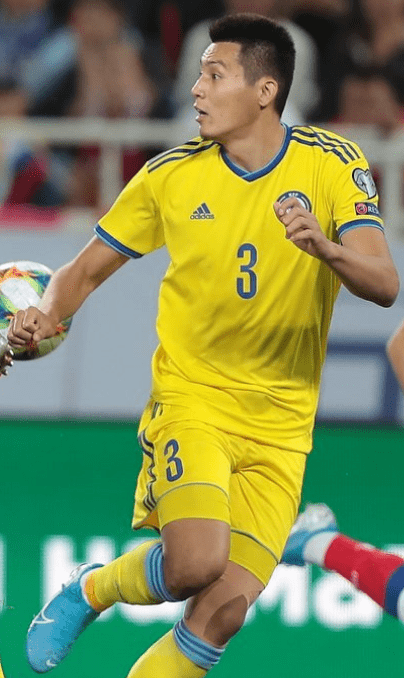
- Yerlanov in 2019

Personal information
- Full name: Temirlan Yerlanuly Yerlanov
- Date of birth: 9 July 1993 (age 33)
- Place of birth: Oskemen, Kazakhstan
- Height: 1.92 m (6 ft 4 in)
- Position: Centre-back

Team information
- Current team: Aktobe
- Number: 23

Senior career*
Years	Team	Apps	(Gls)
2012	Zhetysu	0	(0)
2012	Sunkar	0	(0)
2013–2015	Vostok	27	(1)
2016–2019	Ordabasy	70	(7)
2020–2021	Tobol	17	(1)
2021	Ordabasy	16	(1)
2021–2022	Aktobe	26	(1)
2023–2024	Ordabasy	42	(4)
2025	Tobol	11	(0)
2026–	Aktobe	25	(5)

International career^{‡}
2019–	Kazakhstan	25	(2)
- * Club domestic league appearances and goals as of 1 November 2026 ‡ National team caps and goals as of 14 November 2026

Temirlan Yerlanuly Yerlanov (Kazakh: Темірлан Ерланұлы Ерланов, Temırlan Erlanūly Erlanov; born 9 July 1993) is a Kazakhstani professional footballer who plays as a centre-back for Aktobe and the Kazakhstan national team.

== Club career ==
On 5 January 2020, FC Tobol announced the signing of Yerlanov on a contract until the end of 2020.

== International career ==
Yerlanov made his debut for Kazakhstan on 21 February 2019, starting in a friendly against Moldova before being substituted off at half-time, with the match finishing as a 1–0 win.

== Career statistics ==
=== Club ===
As of match played 10 November 2019

Appearances and goals by club, season and competition
Club	Season	League			National Cup		Continental		Other		Total	
Club	Season	Division	Apps	Goals	Apps	Goals	Apps	Goals	Apps	Goals	Apps	Goals
Ordabasy	2016	Kazakhstan Premier League	3	0	0	0	1	1	-		4	1
Ordabasy	2017	Kazakhstan Premier League	25	1	2	0	2	0	-		29	1
Ordabasy	2018	Kazakhstan Premier League	17	4	0	0	-		-		17	4
Ordabasy	2019	Kazakhstan Premier League	25	2	2	1	4	1	-		31	4
Ordabasy	Total		70	7	4	1	7	2	-	-	81	10
Career total			70	7	4	1	7	2	-	-	81	10

=== International ===
As of match played on 13 November 2026

Appearances and goals by national team and year
National team	Year	Apps	Goals
Kazakhstan	2019	7	1
Kazakhstan	2020	2	0
Kazakhstan	2021	4	0
Kazakhstan	2022	2	0
Kazakhstan	2023	4	0
Kazakhstan	2024	2	0
Kazakhstan	2025	0	0
Kazakhstan	2026	4	1
Total		25	2

Scores and results list Kazakhstan's goal tally first.

List of international goals scored by Temirlan Yerlanov
No.	Date	Venue	Opponent	Score	Result	Competition
1	10 October 2019	Astana Arena, Nur-Sultan, Kazakhstan	Cyprus	1–0	1–2	UEFA Euro 2020 qualification
2	26 September 2026	Tórsvøllur, Tórshavn, Faroe Islands	Faroe Islands	1–1	1–1	2026–27 UEFA Nations League C
