= Rúben Brígido =

Portuguese footballer (born 1991)

Personal information
- Full name: Rúben Luís Maurício Brígido
- Date of birth: 23 June 1991 (age 35)
- Place of birth: Leiria, Portugal
- Height: 1.71 m (5 ft 7 in)
- Position: Midfielder

Team information
- Current team: Doxa
- Number: 10

Youth career
- 2001–2003: União Serra
- 2003–2004: Sporting CP
- 2004–2005: Fátima
- 2005–2007: CADE
- 2007–2010: União Leiria

Senior career*
Years	Team	Apps	(Gls)
2010–2012	União Leiria	32	(0)
2012–2014	Marítimo B	34	(6)
2012–2014	Marítimo	10	(0)
2014–2015	Oțelul Galați	10	(0)
2015–2016	Ermis	10	(0)
2016	Othellos Athienou	7	(0)
2016–2017	Anagennisi Deryneia	21	(3)
2017–2018	Nea Salamina	34	(1)
2018–2019	Beroe	71	(6)
2020–2021	Ordabasy	37	(4)
2021–2022	Tobol	20	(1)
2022–2023	Caspiy	22	(5)
2024	Kyzylzhar	20	(1)
2025–	Doxa	24	(5)

International career
2010–2011	Portugal U20	3	(0)
- * Club domestic league appearances and goals as of 3 May 2026

Rúben Luís Maurício Brígido (born 23 June 1991 in Leiria) is a Portuguese professional footballer who plays as a central midfielder for Cypriot Second Division club Doxa Katokopias.

== Career statistics ==
As of 11 May 2019

Club	Season	League		Cup		League Cup		Europe		Total	
Club	Season	Apps	Goals	Apps	Goals	Apps	Goals	Apps	Goals	Apps	Goals
União Leiria	2009–10	1	0	0	0	0	0	–		1	0
União Leiria	2010–11	25	0	0	0	0	0	–		25	0
União Leiria	2011–12	6	0	0	0	0	0	–		6	0
União Leiria	Total	32	0	0	0	0	0	0	0	32	0
Marítimo B	2012–13	23	4	–		–		–		23	4
Marítimo B	2013–14	11	2	–		–		–		11	2
Marítimo B	Total	34	6	0	0	0	0	0	0	34	6
Marítimo	2012–13	2	0	2	0	2	0	2	0	8	0
Marítimo	2013–14	8	0	1	0	5	1	0	0	14	1
Marítimo	Total	10	0	3	0	7	1	2	0	22	1
Oțelul Galați	2014–15	10	0	1	0	1	0	–		12	0
Oțelul Galați	Total	10	0	1	0	1	0	0	0	12	0
Ermis	2015–16	10	0	1	0	–		–		11	0
Ermis	Total	10	0	1	0	0	0	0	0	11	0
Othellos Athienou	2015–16	7	0	0	0	–		–		7	0
Othellos Athienou	Total	7	0	0	0	0	0	0	0	7	0
Anagennisi Deryneia	2016–17	21	3	0	0	–		–		21	3
Anagennisi Deryneia	Total	21	3	0	0	0	0	0	0	21	3
Nea Salamina	2016–17	14	0	0	0	–		–		14	0
Nea Salamina	2017–18	20	1	0	0	–		–		20	1
Nea Salamina	Total	34	1	0	0	0	0	0	0	34	1
Beroe	2017–18	16	0	0	0	–		–		16	0
Beroe	2018–19	32	3	2	0	–		–		34	3
Beroe	Total	48	3	2	0	0	0	0	0	50	3
Career total		199	13	6	0	8	1	2	0	215	14
