= Timur Dosmagambetov =

Kazakhstani footballer

Personal information
- Full name: Timur Talgatuly Dosmagambetov
- Date of birth: 1 May 1989 (age 37)
- Place of birth: Kokshetau, Kazakh SSR, Soviet Union
- Height: 1.72 m (5 ft 8 in)
- Position: Midfielder

Team information
- Current team: Aktobe
- Number: 27

Youth career
- Torpedo Kokshetau

Senior career*
Years	Team	Apps	(Gls)
2007	Aksu Stepnogorsk	15	(0)
2008–2009	Okzhetpes	41	(7)
2010	Aktobe	12	(1)
2011–2012	Okzhetpes	59	(5)
2013	Vostok	29	(1)
2014–2015	Taraz	51	(6)
2016	Tobol	23	(0)
2017	Okzhetpes	30	(4)
2018–2021	Ordabasy	95	(6)
2021	Taraz	6	(3)
2022	Shakhter Karagandy	13	(5)
2022–2025	Astana	31	(7)
2025	Okzhetpes	23	(2)
2026–	Aktobe	26	(1)

International career^{‡}
2009	Kazakhstan U21	2	(0)
2015–	Kazakhstan	19	(0)
- * Club domestic league appearances and goals as of 1 November 2026 ‡ National team caps and goals as of 22 November 2023

Timur Talgatuly Dosmagambetov (Kazakh: Тимур Талғатұлы Досмағамбетов, Timur Talğatūly Dosmağambetov; born 1 May 1989) is a Kazakhstani professional footballer who plays as a midfielder for Aktobe and the Kazakhstan national team.

== Career ==
On 11 July 2022, Astana announced the signing of Dosmagambetov.

Dosmagambetov made his international debut for Kazakhstan on 12 May 2015 in a friendly match against Burkina Faso, which finished as a 0–0 draw.

== Career statistics ==
As of match played 13 June 2022

Kazakhstan
Year	Apps	Goals
2015	3	0
2016	2	0
2017	0	0
2018	0	0
2019	0	0
2020	3	0
2021	1	0
2022	4	0
Total	13	0
