= Mirzad Mehanović =

Bosnian footballer (born 1993)

Personal information
- Date of birth: 5 January 1993 (age 33)
- Place of birth: Srebrenica, Bosnia and Herzegovina
- Height: 1.74 m (5 ft 9 in)
- Position: Midfielder

Team information
- Current team: Sloboda Tuzla
- Number: 10

Youth career
- Sarajevo
- –2014: Mladá Boleslav

Senior career*
Years	Team	Apps	(Gls)
2014–2015	Mladá Boleslav	6	(1)
2015	→ Kolín (loan)	9	(1)
2015	→ Podbrezová (loan)	11	(3)
2016	Varnsdorf	12	(4)
2016–2017	Jablonec	30	(7)
2017–2020	Fastav Zlín	18	(3)
2018–2019	→ Ordabasy (loan)	40	(4)
2020–2021	Ordabasy	30	(3)
2021–2022	Tuzla City	27	(7)
2022–2023	Al-Shoulla	10	(3)
2023–2024	Tuzla City	30	(7)
2024	Radnik Bijeljina	15	(2)
2025	Andijon	7	(0)
2025–2026	Mes Rafsanjan	3	(0)
2026–	Sloboda Tuzla	13	(7)
- * Club domestic league appearances and goals as of 12 June 2026

Mirzad Mehanović (born 5 January 1993) is a Bosnian professional footballer who plays as a midfielder for First League of FBiH club Sloboda Tuzla.

== Career ==
Mehanović made his Fortuna Liga debut for Podbrezová against Trenčín on 25 July 2015.

In August 2017, he signed with Fastav Zlín. In the summer of 2018, Mehanović was loaned out to Ordabasy in Kazakhstan, where he played until the end of 2019. The deal between him and Ordabasy was made permanent in February 2020.

On 12 July 2021, Mehanović left Ordabasy, signing a three-year contract with Bosnian Premier League club Tuzla City on 21 July.

On 21 August 2022, Mehanović joined Saudi First Division side Al-Shoulla.
