= Ziguy Badibanga =

Belgian footballer (born 1991)

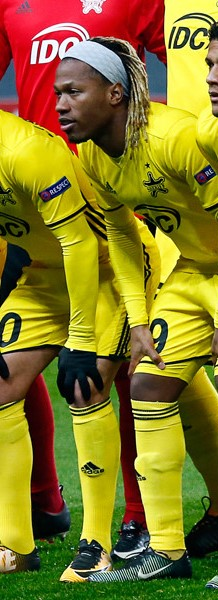
- Badibanga in 2017

Personal information
- Full name: Ziguy Badibanga
- Date of birth: 26 November 1991 (age 34)
- Place of birth: Evere, Belgium
- Height: 1.72 m (5 ft 7 1/2 in)
- Position: Winger

Team information
- Current team: Hapoel Afula
- Number: 39

Senior career*
Years	Team	Apps	(Gls)
2009–2013	Anderlecht	19	(2)
2012	→ De Graafschap (loan)	18	(0)
2012–2013	→ Charleroi (loan)	23	(3)
2013–2014	Ergotelis	29	(6)
2014–2015	Asteras Tripolis	14	(0)
2015–2016	Omonia	24	(6)
2017–2019	Sheriff Tiraspol	40	(12)
2019–2021	Ordabasy	43	(5)
2021	Shakhter Karagandy	6	(0)
2021	AEL	4	(0)
2022	Anagennisi Karditsa	15	(2)
2022–2024	Chornomorets Odesa	44	(4)
2024–2025	Bnei Yehuda	10	(0)
2025–	Hapoel Afula	8	(0)

International career^{‡}
2009–2010	Belgium U19	14	(3)
2010–2012	Belgium U21	7	(2)
- * Club domestic league appearances and goals as of 15 June 2025 ‡ National team caps and goals as of 22:39, 12 April 2012 (UTC)

Ziguy Badibanga (born 26 November 1991) is a Belgian professional footballer who plays as a winger for Hapoel Afula.

== Career ==
=== Club ===
Badibanga was born in Evere, Belgium, and is of Congolese descent. He began his career in 2009 at Belgian giants Anderlecht and spent two and a half years at the club where he scored 2 league goals in 19 league games. He decided in January 2012 to accept a half year loan offer abroad in Doetinchem, Netherlands to play for De Graafschap, where he failed to score in 18 league games. Returning to Anderlecht in the summer of 2012, he did not get a starting place at the club for the 2012–13 season. Anderlecht put him on loan once again, this time to Charleroi, where he played 23 league games and scored 3 goals. At the end of the season he returned to Anderlecht and the club were preparing to use him as a starting player but his impressive year at Charleroi attracted offers from clubs around Europe. In the summer of 2013, he accepted an offer to move abroad to Heraklion, Crete, Greece to sign for Ergotelis. In 2013–14, he played 29 league games and scored 6 league goals. In the summer of 2015, Ziguy accepted an offer to move to Tripoli to sign with other Greek club Asteras Tripolis. During his one year in Arcadia he played 14 league games and scored no goals. In the summer of 2015, Badibanga accepted an offer to go to Nicosia, Cyprus to play for Omonia.

On 3 April 2019, Badibanga left Sheriff Tiraspol by mutual termination of his contract.

In April 2019, Badibanga signed a two-year contract with FC Ordabasy.

On 11 April 2021, Badibanga signed for FC Shakhter Karagandy.

=== International ===
As a native of Belgium, Badibanga is eligible to represent Belgium, while through his Congolese heritage he is also eligible to represent DR Congo in International football. Badibanga has appeared for Belgium at youth level as he has played with the Belgium U19 and Belgium U21 teams from 2009 to 2010 and from 2010 to 2012 respectively.

== Honours ==
Individual

- Ukrainian Premier League player of the Month: February–March 2023
