= 2023 FC Ordabasy season =

FC Ordabasy
2023 season
- Chairman: Kaysar Abdraymov
- Manager: Aleksandr Sednyov
- Stadium: Kazhymukan Munaitpasov Stadium
- Premier League: 1st
- Kazakhstan Cup: Runners-up
- Kazakhstan Super Cup: Runners-up
- UEFA Europa Conference League: Second qualifying round vs Legia Warsaw
- Top goalscorer: League: Askhat Tagybergen (11); All: Askhat Tagybergen (14)
- Highest home attendance: 22,168 vs Okzhetpes (21 May 2023)
- Lowest home attendance: 10,000vs Caspiy (04 March 2023)
- Average home league attendance: 16,646 (22 October 2023)
Home colours	Away colours

The 2023 FC Ordabasy season is the 21st successive season that Ordabasy will play in the Kazakhstan Premier League, the highest tier of association football in Kazakhstan.

== Season events ==
On 24 February, Ordabasy announced the signing of Radosav Petrović from Real Zaragoza, Temirlan Yerlanov from Aktobe, Mamadou Mbodj from Neftçi, Bernardo Matić from HNK Šibenik and Aybar Zhaksylykov from Tobol.

On 25 February, Ordabasy announced the signings of Gafurzhan Suyumbayev and Yerkebulan Tungyshbayev from Aksu, Serhiy Malyi from Tobol, Mukhammedzhan Seysen from Taraz, and Bobur Abdikholikov from Energetik-BGU Minsk.

On 1 March, Ordabasy announced the signing of free-agent Bauyrzhan Islamkhan.

On 6 July, Ordabasy announced the signing of Artem Biesiedin from Dynamo Kyiv.

On 10 July, Ordabasy announced the signing of Duman Narzildayev from Caspiy.

On 13 July, Ordabasy announced the signing of Yevhenii Makarenko from Fehérvár.

== Squad ==
As of match played 4 November 2023

No.	Name	Nationality	Position	Date of birth (age)	Signed from	Signed in	Contract ends	Apps.	Goals
Goalkeepers
1	Bekkhan Shayzada	(Kazakhstan)	GK	28 February 1998 (aged 25)	Youth Team	2016		86	0
51	Kazhymukan Tolepbergen	(Kazakhstan)	GK	21 April 2000 (aged 23)	Youth Team	2020		3	0
74	Mukhammedzhan Seysen	(Kazakhstan)	GK	14 February 1999 (aged 24)	Taraz	2023		15	0
Defenders
5	Gafurzhan Suyumbayev	(Kazakhstan)	DF	19 August 1990 (aged 33)	Aksu	2023			
23	Temirlan Yerlanov	(Kazakhstan)	DF	9 July 1993 (aged 30)	Aktobe	2023		130	15
25	Serhiy Malyi	(Kazakhstan)	DF	5 June 1990 (aged 33)	Tobol	2023		91	8
26	Mamadou Mbodj	(Senegal)	DF	12 March 1993 (aged 30)	Neftçi	2023		33	2
27	Bernardo Matić	(Croatia)	DF	27 July 1994 (aged 29)	Šibenik	2023		32	2
99	Auro Jr.	(Brazil)	DF	23 January 1996 (aged 27)	Toronto FC	2023		27	1
Midfielders
6	Duman Narzildayev	(Kazakhstan)	MF	6 September 1993 (aged 30)	Caspiy	2023		8	0
7	Shokhboz Umarov	(Uzbekistan)	MF	9 March 1999 (aged 24)	BATE Borisov	2023		46	5
8	Askhat Tagybergen	(Kazakhstan)	MF	9 August 1990 (aged 33)	Tobol	2023		30	13
9	Bauyrzhan Islamkhan	(Kazakhstan)	MF	23 February 1993 (aged 30)	Unattached	2023		13	2
11	Maksim Fedin	(Kazakhstan)	MF	8 June 1996 (aged 27)	Turan	2022		46	6
14	Murojon Khalmatov	(Kazakhstan)	MF	20 July 2003 (aged 20)	Kairat Academy	2021		25	3
17	Akmal Bakhtiyarov	(Kazakhstan)	MF	2 June 1998 (aged 25)	Olimp-Dolgoprudny	2022		24	1
19	Yevheniy Makarenko	(Ukraine)	MF	21 May 1991 (aged 32)	Fehérvár	2023		12	1
21	Yerkebulan Tungyshbayev	(Kazakhstan)	MF	14 January 1995 (aged 28)	Aksu	2023		206	28
22	Sultanbek Astanov	(Kazakhstan)	MF	23 March 1999 (aged 24)	Kairat	2023		37	4
47	Vladislav Vasilyev	(Kazakhstan)	MF	10 April 1997 (aged 26)	Tobol	2023		19	1
88	Jorginho	(Guinea-Bissau)	MF	21 September 1995 (aged 28)	Ludogorets Razgrad	2023		19	0
Forwards
20	Batyrkhan Tazhibay	(Kazakhstan)	FW	7 August 2001 (aged 22)	Academy	2021		33	1
29	Vsevolod Sadovsky	(Belarus)	FW	4 October 1996 (aged 27)	Rukh Brest	2022		57	15
41	Artem Byesyedin	(Ukraine)	FW	31 March 1996 (aged 27)	Dynamo Kyiv	2023		10	2
45	Bobur Abdikholikov	(Uzbekistan)	FW	23 April 1997 (aged 26)	Energetik-BGU Minsk	2023		36	8
99	Aybar Zhaksylykov	(Kazakhstan)	FW	24 July 1997 (aged 26)	Tobol	2023		22	2
Players away on loan
12	Victor Braga	(Brazil)	MF	18 April 2001 (aged 22)	Londrina	2022		31	0
	Maksim Vaganov	(Kazakhstan)	MF	8 August 2000 (aged 23)	Makhtaaral	2021		19	2
Players that left during the season
10	Elkhan Astanov	(Kazakhstan)	MF	21 May 2000 (aged 23)	Youth Team	2019		80	12
15	Radosav Petrović	(Serbia)	MF	8 March 1989 (aged 34)	Real Zaragoza	2023		14	0

=== On Loan ===
Note: Flags indicate national team as defined under FIFA eligibility rules; some limited exceptions apply. Players may hold more than one non-FIFA nationality.

No. / Pos. / Nation / Player; — / MF / KAZ / Maksim Vaganov (at Caspiy)	No. / Pos. / Nation / Player; — / MF / BRA / Victor Braga (at Maktaaral)

== Transfers ==
=== In ===
Date	Position	Nationality	Name	From	Fee	Ref.
19 January 2023	MF	(Uzbekistan)	Shokhboz Umarov	BATE Borisov	Undisclosed	
24 February 2023	DF	(Kazakhstan)	Temirlan Yerlanov	Aktobe	Undisclosed	
24 February 2023	DF	(Senegal)	Mamadou Mbodj	Neftçi	Undisclosed	
24 February 2023	MF	(Croatia)	Bernardo Matić	HNK Šibenik	Undisclosed	
24 February 2023	MF	(Kazakhstan)	Askhat Tagybergen	Tobol	Undisclosed	
24 February 2023	MF	(Kazakhstan)	Vladislav Vasilyev	Tobol	Undisclosed	
24 February 2023	MF	(Serbia)	Radosav Petrović	Real Zaragoza	Undisclosed	
24 February 2023	FW	(Kazakhstan)	Aybar Zhaksylykov	Tobol	Undisclosed	
25 February 2023	GK	(Kazakhstan)	Mukhammedzhan Seysen	Taraz	Undisclosed	
25 February 2023	DF	(Kazakhstan)	Serhiy Malyi	Tobol	Undisclosed	
25 February 2023	DF	(Kazakhstan)	Gafurzhan Suyumbayev	Aksu	Undisclosed	
25 February 2023	MF	(Kazakhstan)	Yerkebulan Tungyshbayev	Aksu	Undisclosed	
25 February 2023	FW	(Uzbekistan)	Bobur Abdikholikov	Energetik-BGU Minsk	Undisclosed	
1 March 2023	MF	(Kazakhstan)	Bauyrzhan Islamkhan	Unattached	Free	
4 March 2023	DF	(Brazil)	Auro Jr.	Toronto	Undisclosed	
6 July 2023	FW	(Ukraine)	Artem Biesiedin	Dynamo Kyiv	Undisclosed	
10 July 2023	MF	(Kazakhstan)	Duman Narzildayev	Caspiy	Undisclosed	
13 July 2023	MF	(Ukraine)	Yevhenii Makarenko	Fehérvár	Undisclosed	

=== Out ===
Date	Position	Nationality	Name	To	Fee	Ref.
13 March 2023	MF	(Kazakhstan)	Elkhan Astanov	Astana	Undisclosed	

=== Loans out ===
Date from	Position	Nationality	Name	To	Date to	Ref.
20 March 2023	MF	(Kazakhstan)	Zikrillo Sultaniyazov	Turan	End of season	

=== Released ===
Date	Position	Nationality	Name	Joined	Date	Ref.
30 June 2023	MF	(Serbia)	Radosav Petrović	APOEL	21 July 2023	
31 December 2023	DF	(Brazil)	Auro Jr.	Torpedo Kutaisi	13 April 2024	
31 December 2023	MF	(Brazil)	Victor Braga	Zhetysu		
31 December 2023	MF	(Croatia)	Bernardo Matić	Kisvárda	15 January 2024	
31 December 2023	MF	(Guinea-Bissau)	Jorginho	Torpedo Kutaisi	19 January 2024	
31 December 2023	MF	(Kazakhstan)	Duman Narzildayev	Kaisar	5 February 2024	
31 December 2023	FW	(Kazakhstan)	Aybar Zhaksylykov	Kaisar		
31 December 2023	FW	(Uzbekistan)	Bobur Abdikholikov	Nasaf	2 February 2024	

== Competitions ==
=== Overview ===
Competition	First match	Last match	Starting round	Final position	Record							
Competition	First match	Last match	Starting round	Final position	Pld	W	D	L	GF	GA	GD	Win %
Premier League	4 March 2023	29 October 2023	Matchday 1	Winners	26	18	4	4	48	21	+27	69.23
Kazakhstan Cup	19 April 2023	4 November 2023	Round of 16	Runners-up	7	3	0	4	9	6	+3	42.86
Super Cup	25 February 2023		Final	Runners-up	1	0	0	1	1	2	−1	0.00
UEFA Europa Conference League	27 July 2023	3 August 2023	Second qualifying round	Second qualifying round	2	0	1	1	4	5	−1	0.00
Total					36	21	5	10	62	34	+28	58.33

Last updated: 4 November 2023
Source: Competitions

=== Super Cup ===
25 February 2023	Astana	2–1	Ordabasy	Astana
15:00 (UTC+6)	Amanović 8'; Darboe 38'; Ourega (yellow card) 51'	Report	Tungyshbayev 9'; Yerlanov (yellow card) 41'; Mbodj (yellow card) 67'	Stadium: Astana Arena; Attendance: 7,313; Referee: Daniyar Sakhi

=== Premier League ===
==== Results summary ====
Overall								Home						Away					
Pld	W	D	L	GF	GA	GD	Pts	W	D	L	GF	GA	GD	W	D	L	GF	GA	GD
26	18	4	4	48	21	+27	58	11	1	1	27	8	+19	7	3	3	21	13	+8

Last updated: 29 October 2023.
Source: See Results

==== Results by round ====
Round	1	2	3	4	5	6	7	8	9	10	11	12	13	14	15	16	17	18	19	20	21	22	23	24	25	26
Ground	H	A	H	A	H	H	A	H	A	H	A	H	A	H	A	A	H	A	H	A	A	H	H	A	H	A
Result	W	W	W	L	W	W	D	W	W	W	W	W	W	W	W	D	W	W	W	D	L	L	W	W	W	L
Position	1	1	2	4	4	3	4	3	3	2	2	2	2	2	1	1	1	1	1	1	1	1	1	1	1	1

Source: See Results
A = Away; H = Home; W = Win; D = Draw; L = Loss

==== Results ====
4 March 2023 1	Ordabasy	3–1	Caspiy	Shymkent
14:00 (UTC+6)	Islamkhan 15'; Tagybergen 48'; Mbodj (yellow card) 55'; Abdikholikov 65'; Malyi (red card) 81'	Report	Pantsulaia 70'; Diakate (yellow card) 73'	Stadium: Kazhymukan Munaitpasov Stadium; Attendance: 10,000; Referee: Saken Bayimbet

9 March 2023 2	Shakhter Karagandy	1–4	Ordabasy	Astana
14:00 (UTC+6)	Dmitrenko (yellow card) 58'; Tattybayev (yellow card) 71'; Alishauskas (yellow card) 80'	Report	Suyumbayev 3'; Tagybergen 59'; Mbodj 67'; Umarov 79' (pen.)	Stadium: Astana Arena; Attendance: 300; Referee: Denis Tevyashov

14 March 2023 3	Ordabasy	2–0	Zhetysu	Shymkent
19:00 (UTC+6)	Abdikholikov 17'; Umarov 35'; Islamkhan (yellow card) 68'; Mbodj (yellow card) 90'	Report	Adil (yellow card) 45'; Tsintsadze (yellow card) 69'; Nurball (yellow card) 90'	Stadium: Kazhymukan Munaitpasov Stadium; Attendance: 12,000; Referee: Rustam Omarov

2 April 2023 4	Astana	2–0	Ordabasy	Astana
19:00 (UTC+6)	Tomasov 62'; Mbodj 71' (o.g.)	Report		Stadium: Astana Arena; Attendance: Alexander Zatula; Referee: 8,500

9 April 2023 5	Ordabasy	1–1	Aktobe	Shymkent
21:00 (UTC+6)	Umarov (yellow card) 37'; Islamkhan (yellow card) 45+2'; Malyi (yellow card) 88' (goal) 90+6'; Fedin (yellow card) 90+2'; Tagybergen (yellow card) 90+2'	Report	Tanzharikov (yellow card) 40'; Filipović (yellow card) 63'; Raičković (yellow card) 64'; Vidémont 65'; Kasym (yellow card) 88'; Gadrani (yellow card) 90+2'	Stadium: Kazhymukan Munaitpasov Stadium; Attendance: 18,063; Referee: Artem Kuchin

16 April 2023 6	Ordabasy	4–1	Tobol	Shymkent
21:00 (UTC+6)	Tagybergen 21'; Auro Jr. (yellow card) 64'; Islamkhan (yellow card) 70'; Abdikholikov 72'; Malyi 77'; Sadovsky 86'	Report	Déblé 22' (yellow card) 82'; Muzhikov (yellow card) 23'; Mlađović (yellow card) 28'; Chesnokov (yellow card) 76'; Konovalov (yellow card) FT	Stadium: Kazhymukan Munaitpasov Stadium; Attendance: 18,000; Referee: Bulat Sariev

23 April 2023 7	Kairat	2–2	Ordabasy	Almaty
18:00 (UTC+6)	Shvyryov (yellow card) 34'; João Paulo 36', 76'; Kurgin (yellow card) 56'; Kenzhebek (yellow card) 82'	Report	Suyumbayev 58'; Yerlanov (yellow card) 63'; Tagybergen 68' (pen.)	Stadium: Central Stadium; Attendance: 15,200; Referee: Grigory Moskovchenko

6 May 2023 8	Ordabasy	4–0	Kaisar	Shymkent
21:00 (UTC+6)	Tagybergen 37'; Abdikholikov 52'; Yerlanov 73'; Malyi (yellow card) 85'; Zhaksylykov 90+2'; Fedin (yellow card) 90+5'	Report	Ghinaitis (yellow card) 88'; Mendy (yellow card) 90+4'	Stadium: Kazhymukan Munaitpasov Stadium; Attendance: 19,563; Referee: Alexander Zatula

13 May 2023 9	Maktaaral	1–2	Ordabasy	Shymkent
21:00 (UTC+6)	Zhangylyshbay (yellow card) 39'; Avetisyan 54'; Dairov (yellow card) 60'; Yudenkov (yellow card) 73'; Zhaksylykov (yellow card) 85'	Report	Tagybergen 5'; Mbodj (yellow card) 50'; Petrović (yellow card) 87'; Sadovsky 90+3'	Stadium: Kazhymukan Munaitpasov Stadium; Attendance: 15,500; Referee: Sayat Karabaev

21 May 2023 10	Ordabasy	1–0	Okzhetpes	Shymkent
21:00 (UTC+6)	Auro Jr. 32'; Petrović (yellow card) 40'; Mbodj (yellow card) 85'	Report	Drachenko (yellow card) 53'	Stadium: Kazhymukan Munaitpasov Stadium; Attendance: 22,168; Referee: Saken Bayymbet

28 May 2023 11	Kyzylzhar	0–1	Ordabasy	Petropavl
16:00 (UTC+6)	Muldinov (yellow card) 86'; Shadmanov (yellow card) 87'	Report	Malyi (yellow card) 10'; Tagybergen (yellow card) 86'; Matić 90+3'	Stadium: Karasai Stadium; Attendance: 2,000; Referee: Denis Tevyashov

3 June 2023 12	Ordabasy	2–1	Atyrau	Shymkent
21:00 (UTC+6)	Abdikholikov 25'; Malyi 30'; Suyumbayev (yellow card) 67'; Petrović (yellow card) 90+1'	Report	Nsungusi 49' (yellow card) 72'; Novak (yellow card) 51'; Bissi (yellow card) 59'	Stadium: Kazhymukan Munaitpasov Stadium; Attendance: 18,063; Referee: Bulat Sariev

24 June 2023 13	Aksu	0–1	Ordabasy	Pavlodar
21:00 (UTC+6)	Turlybek (yellow card) 18'; Silva (yellow card) 69'	Report	Malyi (yellow card) 27'; Vasilyev 66'; Yerlanov (yellow card) 69'; Matić (yellow card) 69'; Tungyshbayev (yellow card) 75'	Stadium: Central Stadium; Attendance: 5,230; Referee: Daniyar Sakhi

2 July 2023 14	Ordabasy	2–0	Aksu	Shymkent
21:00 (UTC+6)	Sadovsky (yellow card) 24' (goal) 58'; Yerlanov 45+4'	Report	Obilor (yellow card) 35'; Zhaksybaev (yellow card) 45+3'; Solovey (yellow card) 55'; Sagnayev (yellow card) 72'	Stadium: Kazhymukan Munaitpasov Stadium; Attendance: 16,000; Referee: Anton Kuchma

15 July 2023 15	Atyrau	1–1	Ordabasy	Atyrau
20:00 (UTC+6)	Kozlov 31'; Antanavičius (yellow card) 45+3'; Stepanov (yellow card) 48'; Nsungusi (yellow card) 89'	Report	Tagybergen 50'; Malyi (yellow card) 70'; Shayzada (yellow card) 89'	Stadium: Munaishy Stadium; Attendance: 5,000; Referee: Denis Tevyashov

22 July 2023 16	Ordabasy	2–1	Kyzylzhar	Shymkent
21:00 (UTC+6)	Tagybergen 59'; Auro Jr. (yellow card) 66'; Tungyshbayev 90+2'	Report	Chikanchi 24'; Babakhanov (yellow card) 79'; Tapalov (yellow card) 80'; Shakhmetov (yellow card) 82'; Bushman (red card) 84'	Stadium: Kazhymukan Munaitpasov Stadium; Attendance: 14,000; Referee: Alexander Zatula

10 July 2023 17	Okzhetpes	0–4	Ordabasy	Astana
20:00 (UTC+6)	Shamshi (yellow card) 6' (yellow-red card) 42'; Drachenko (yellow card) 62'; Ryzhuk (yellow card) 85'	Report	Tagybergen (yellow card) 9' (goal) 64' (pen.); Abdikholikov 14'; Sadovsky 35'; Islamkhan 86' (pen.)	Stadium: Astana Arena; Attendance: 500; Referee: Denis Izmailov

13 August 2023 19	Kaisar	2–3	Ordabasy	Kyzylorda
21:00 (UTC+6)	Zagré (red card) 33'; Baradzin 66'; Sovpel 74'; Oliveira (yellow card) 86'	Report	Malyi 14'; Yerlanov (yellow card) 33'; Makarenko 40'; Tagybergen 71'	Stadium: Gani Muratbayev Stadium; Attendance: 7,000; Referee: Rustam Omarov

20 August 2023 20	Ordabasy	1–0	Kairat	Shymkent
21:00 (UTC+6)	Umarov (yellow card) 65'; Byesyedin (yellow card) 89'; Matić 90+7'	Report	Kasabulat (yellow card) 6'; Shvyryov (yellow card) 36'; Ustimenko (yellow card) 45+4'; Sadybekov (yellow card) 60'; Bagnack (yellow card) 90+7'	Stadium: Kazhymukan Munaitpasov Stadium; Attendance: 18,063; Referee: Sayat Karabaev

27 August 2023 21	Tobol	0–0	Ordabasy	Kostanay
21:00 (UTC+6)	Zabelin (yellow card) 3'; Zhakupov (yellow card) 38'; Ivanović (yellow card) 79'; Ilić (yellow card) 81'	Report	Malyi (yellow card) 52'	Stadium: Central Stadium; Attendance: 2,000; Referee: Artem Kuchin

16 September 2023 22	Aktobe	2–1	Ordabasy	Aktobe
21:00 (UTC+6)	Gadrani (yellow card) 35'; Shomko (yellow card) 55'; Filipović 63' (yellow card) 90+5'; Niangbo 81'; Raičković (yellow card) 84'; China (yellow card) 89'	Report	Tagybergen 26' (penalty missed) 90+8'; Yerlanov (yellow card) 29'; Malyi (yellow card) 60'; Byesyedin (yellow card) 84'	Stadium: Central Stadium; Attendance: 12,800; Referee: Denis Izmailov

24 September 2023 23	Ordabasy	1–2	Astana	Şymkent
19:00 (UTC+6)	Fedin 88' (pen.); Umarov (yellow card) 90+6'	Report	Darabayev 41'; Jovančić (yellow card) 51'; Zhaksylykov 60'	Stadium: Kazhymukan Munaitpasov Stadium; Attendance: 18,063; Referee: Bulat Sariev

27 September 2023 18	Ordabasy	1–0	Maktaaral	Şymkent
20:00 (UTC+6)	Vasilyev (yellow card) 30'; Yerlanov (yellow card) 54'; Abdikholikov 61'; Fedin (yellow card) 90'	Report	Charleston (yellow card) 18'; Braga (yellow card) 54'; Nyuiadzi (yellow card) 87'	Stadium: Kazhymukan Munaitpasov Stadium; Attendance: 13,843; Referee: Daniyar Sakhi

1 October 2023 24	Zhetysu	1–2	Ordabasy	Taldykorgan
16:00 (UTC+6)	Aslan (yellow card) 35'; Nurball (yellow card) 49'; Rušević (yellow card) 57'; Amirseitov 79'	Report	Matić (yellow card) 16'; Byesyedin 55'; Malyi (yellow card) 57'; Yerlanov 63'; Suyumbayev (yellow card) 68'; Tungyshbayev (yellow card) 75'	Stadium: Zhetysu Stadium; Attendance: 2,500; Referee: Rustam Omarov

22 October 2023 25	Ordabasy	3–1	Shakhter Karagandy	Şymkent
19:00 (UTC+6)	Zhaksylykov 4'; Umarov 12'; Byesyedin 27'; Mbodj (yellow card) 46'; Abdikholikov (yellow card) 63'	Report	Chogadze 46'; Savkiv (yellow card) 53'	Stadium: Kazhymukan Munaitpasov Stadium; Attendance: 18,000; Referee: Grigory Moskovchenko

29 October 2023 26	Caspiy	1–0	Ordabasy	Aktau
17:00 (UTC+6)	Kocev (yellow card) 28'; Avric 75' (pen.)	Report	Byesyedin (yellow card) 19'; Vasilyev (yellow card) 88'; Tungyshbayev (yellow card) 89'; Fedin (yellow card) 90+4'	Stadium: Zhastar Stadium; Attendance: 0 Referee: Aydyn Tasybayev
Note: Match played behind closed doors due to the Kostenko mine disaster.

==== League table ====
Pos	Team	Pld	W	D	L	GF	GA	GD	Pts	Qualification or relegation
1	Ordabasy (C)	26	18	4	4	48	21	+27	58	Qualification for the Champions League first qualifying round
2	Astana	26	16	5	5	36	24	+12	53	Qualification for the Conference League second qualifying round
3	Aktobe	26	13	11	2	44	23	+21	50	Qualification for the Conference League first qualifying round
4	Kairat	26	12	8	6	44	32	+12	44	
5	Kyzylzhar	26	11	6	9	25	23	+2	39	

Source: UEFA, Soccerway
Rules for classification: 1) Points; 2) Goal difference; 3) Matches won; 4) Goals scored; 5) Away goals scored; 6) Head-to-head points; 7) Head-to-head matches won; 8) Head-to-head goal difference; 9) Head-to-head goals scored; 10) Head-to-head away goals scored; 11) Draw.
(C) Champions

=== Kazakhstan Cup ===
==== Knockout stages ====
19 April 2023 Round of 16 1st leg	Ordabasy	1–2	Maktaaral	Shymkent
21:00 (UTC+6)	Abdikholikov 19'; Petrović (yellow card) 37' (yellow-red card) 85'; Tungyshbayev (yellow card) 77'; Umarov (yellow card) 80'; Fedin (yellow card) 86'; Yerlanov (yellow card) 90+2'	Report	Koné 4'; Sandoval 20'; Doumbia (yellow card) 30'; Braga (yellow card) 67'; Zhaksylykov (yellow card) 81'; Kabananga (yellow card) 86'	Stadium: Kazhymukan Munaitpasov Stadium; Attendance: 11,000; Referee: Anton Moltusinov

29 April 2023 Round of 16 2nd leg	Maktaaral	1–4 (3–5 agg.)	Ordabasy	Shymkent
21:00 (UTC+6)	Sandoval 14'; Muhammad (yellow card) 55'; Koné (yellow card) 58'; Kalmykov (red card) 80'	Report	Mbodj (yellow card) 29'; Suyumbayev (yellow card) 48'; Tagybergen 66' (pen.), 84'; Sadovsky 76'; Fedin (yellow card) 89'; Umarov 90+2'	Stadium: Kazhymukan Munaitpasov Stadium; Attendance: 6,700; Referee: Rustam Omarov

17 May 2023 Quarterfinal 1st leg	Ordabasy	2–0	Kyzylzhar	Shymkent
21:00 (UTC+6)	Petrović (yellow card) 26'; Astanov (yellow card) 48'; Sadovsky 74'; Tagybergen 77'	Report	Naumov (yellow card) 63'	Stadium: Kazhymukan Munaitpasov Stadium; Attendance: 18,063; Referee: Rustam Omarov

7 June 2023 Quarterfinal 2nd leg	Kyzylzhar	1–0 (1–2 agg.)	Ordabasy	Petropavl
17:00 (UTC+6)	Podio (yellow card) 39'; Shakhmetov (yellow card) 66'; Veselinović 73'; Imnadze (yellow card) 90+4'; Shadmanov (yellow card) 90+4'	Report	Auro Jr. (yellow card) 87'; Sadovsky (yellow card) 90+4'	Stadium: Karasai Stadium; Attendance: 1,700; Referee: Grigory Moskovchenko

28 June 2023 Semifinal 1st leg	Astana	1–0	Ordabasy	Astana
19:00 (UTC+6)	Dosmagambetov (yellow card) 21'; Darabayev (yellow card) 36'; Ivanović 73'	Report	S.Astanov (yellow card) 59'; Abdikholikov (yellow card) 83'	Stadium: Astana Arena; Attendance: 11,600; Referee: Saken Baiymbet

6 July 2023 Semifinal 2nd leg	Ordabasy	2–0 (2–1 agg.)	Astana	Shymkent
21:00 (UTC+6)	Umarov 63'; Mbodj (yellow card) 75'; Yerlanov 105'; Suyumbayev (yellow card) 116'	Report	Amanović (yellow card) 45+1'; Astanov (yellow card) 75'; Jovančić (yellow card) 77'; Beysebekov (red card) 112'	Stadium: Kazhymukan Munaitpasov Stadium; Referee: Alexander Gauser

==== Final ====
4 November 2023	Ordabasy	0–1	Tobol	Astana
16:00 (UTC+6)	Fedin (yellow card) 86'; Suyumbayev (yellow card) 90+1'	Report	Chesnokov 67' (yellow card) 67'; Muzhikov (yellow card) 76'	Stadium: Astana Arena; Attendance: 11,200; Referee: Rustam Omarov

=== UEFA Europa Conference League ===
==== Qualifying rounds ====
27 July 2023 Second Round 1st leg	Ordabasy (Kazakhstan)	2–2	(Poland) Legia Warsaw	Şymkent, Kazakhstan
21:00 (UTC+6)	Sadovsky 13'; Mbodj 48' (yellow card) 58'; Yerlanov (yellow card) 76'; Tagybergen (yellow card) 80'; Narzildayev (yellow card) 80'	Report	Pekhart 63'; Pankov (yellow card) 76'; Kramer 86'; Jędrzejczyk (yellow card) 90+8'	Stadium: Kazhymukan Munaitpasov Stadium; Attendance: 18,056; Referee: Helgi Mikael Jónasson (Iceland)

4 August 2023 Second qualifying round 2nd leg	Legia Warsaw (Poland)	3–2 (5–4 agg.)	(Kazakhstan) Ordabasy	Warsaw, Poland
01:00 (UTC+6)	Wszołek 18'; Pekhart (yellow card) 35' (goal) 71'; Yuri Ribeiro 42'; Tobiasz (yellow card) 58'; Slisz (yellow card) 79'	Report	Astanov (yellow card) 6'; Sadovsky 57' (yellow card) 58'; Makarenko (yellow card) 58'; Malyi (yellow card) 63' (goal) 84'; Tagybergen (yellow card) 77'	Stadium: Stadion Wojska Polskiego; Attendance: 23,517; Referee: Kevin Clancy (Scotland)

== Squad statistics ==
As of match played 4 November 2023

=== Appearances and goals ===
No.	Pos	Nat	Player	Total		Premier League		Kazakhstan Cup		Super Cup		UEFA Europa Conference League	
No.	Pos	Nat	Player	Apps	Goals	Apps	Goals	Apps	Goals	Apps	Goals	Apps	Goals
1	GK	(Kazakhstan) KAZ	Bekkhan Shayzada	21	0	15	0	4	0	0	0	2	0
5	DF	(Kazakhstan) KAZ	Gafurzhan Suyumbayev	31	2	22	2	6+1	0	1	0	1	0
6	MF	(Kazakhstan) KAZ	Duman Narzildayev	8	0	3+4	0	0	0	0	0	0+1	0
7	MF	(Uzbekistan) UZB	Shokhboz Umarov	31	5	16+6	3	4+3	2	1	0	1	0
8	MF	(Kazakhstan) KAZ	Askhat Tagybergen	30	13	23+1	11	3	2	1	0	2	0
9	MF	(Kazakhstan) KAZ	Bauyrzhan Islamkhan	13	2	8+2	2	0+1	0	0	0	2	0
11	MF	(Kazakhstan) KAZ	Maksim Fedin	27	1	9+12	1	0+5	0	0+1	0	0	0
13	GK	(Kazakhstan) KAZ	Kazhymukan Tolepbergen	2	0	0+2	0	0	0	0	0	0	0
14	MF	(Kazakhstan) KAZ	Murojon Khalmatov	2	0	0+2	0	0	0	0	0	0	0
17	MF	(Kazakhstan) KAZ	Akmal Bakhtiyarov	7	0	1+3	0	1+1	0	0+1	0	0	0
19	MF	(Ukraine) UKR	Yevheniy Makarenko	12	1	9	1	1	0	0	0	2	0
20	FW	(Kazakhstan) KAZ	Batyrkhan Tazhibay	2	0	0+2	0	0	0	0	0	0	0
21	MF	(Kazakhstan) KAZ	Yerkebulan Tungyshbayev	33	2	8+15	1	5+2	0	1	1	0+2	0
22	MF	(Kazakhstan) KAZ	Sultanbek Astanov	23	0	7+9	0	2+2	0	1	0	1+1	0
23	DF	(Kazakhstan) KAZ	Temirlan Yerlanov	32	4	21+1	3	7	1	1	0	2	0
25	DF	(Kazakhstan) KAZ	Serhiy Malyi	29	5	20	4	6	0	1	0	2	1
26	DF	(Senegal) SEN	Mamadou Mbodj	33	2	20+3	1	7	0	1	0	2	1
27	DF	(Croatia) CRO	Bernardo Matić	32	2	17+5	2	5+2	0	1	0	0+2	0
29	FW	(Belarus) BLR	Vsevolod Sadovsky	28	9	5+14	4	1+5	3	0+1	0	2	2
41	FW	(Ukraine) UKR	Artem Byesyedin	10	2	7+2	2	1	0	0	0	0	0
45	FW	(Uzbekistan) UZB	Bobur Abdikholikov	36	8	16+10	7	5+2	1	1	0	0+2	0
47	MF	(Kazakhstan) KAZ	Vladislav Vasilyev	19	1	9+5	1	5	0	0	0	0	0
74	GK	(Kazakhstan) KAZ	Mukhammedzhan Seysen	15	0	11	0	3	0	1	0	0	0
88	MF	(Guinea-Bissau) GBS	Jorginho	19	0	7+6	0	4+1	0	0	0	0+1	0
96	DF	(Brazil) BRA	Auro Jr.	27	1	19+1	1	5	0	0	0	2	0
99	FW	(Kazakhstan) KAZ	Aybar Zhaksylykov	22	2	3+11	2	1+5	0	0+1	0	0+1	0
Players away from Ordabasy on loan:
Players who left Ordabasy during the season:
10	MF	(Kazakhstan) KAZ	Elkhan Astanov	2	0	0+2	0	0	0	0	0	0	0
15	MF	(Serbia) SRB	Radosav Petrović	14	0	10+1	0	1+1	0	0+1	0	0	0

=== Goal scorers ===
Place	Position	Nation	Number	Name	Premier League	Super Cup	Kazakhstan Cup	UEFA Europa Conference League	Total
1	MF	(Kazakhstan)	8	Askhat Tagybergen	11	3	0	0	14
2	FW	(Uzbekistan)	45	Bobur Abdikholikov	7	1	0	0	8
2	FW	(Belarus)	29	Vsevolod Sadovsky	4	2	0	2	8
4	DF	(Kazakhstan)	25	Serhiy Malyi	4	0	0	1	5
4	MF	(Uzbekistan)	7	Shokhboz Umarov	3	2	0	0	5
6	DF	(Kazakhstan)	23	Temirlan Yerlanov	3	1	0	0	4
7	MF	(Croatia)	27	Bernardo Matić	2	0	0	0	2
7	DF	(Kazakhstan)	5	Gafurzhan Suyumbayev	2	0	0	0	2
7	MF	(Kazakhstan)	9	Bauyrzhan Islamkhan	2	0	0	0	2
7	FW	(Ukraine)	41	Artem Byesyedin	2	0	0	0	2
7	FW	(Kazakhstan)	99	Aybar Zhaksylykov	2	0	0	0	2
7	MF	(Kazakhstan)	21	Yerkebulan Tungyshbayev	1	0	1	0	2
7	DF	(Senegal)	26	Mamadou Mbodj	1	0	0	1	2
14	MF	(Brazil)	96	Auro Jr.	1	0	0	0	1
14	MF	(Kazakhstan)	11	Maksim Fedin	1	0	0	0	1
14	MF	(Ukraine)	19	Yevheniy Makarenko	1	0	0	0	1
14	MF	(Kazakhstan)	47	Vladislav Vasilyev	1	0	0	0	1
				TOTALS	48	9	1	4	62

=== Clean sheets ===
Place	Position	Nation	Number	Name	Premier League	Kazakhstan Cup	Super Cup	UEFA Europa Conference League	Total
1	GK	(Kazakhstan)	1	Bekkhan Shayzada	8	0	0	0	8
2	GK	(Kazakhstan)	74	Mukhammedzhan Seysen	2	2	0	0	2
				TOTALS	10	2	0	0	12

=== Disciplinary record ===
Number	Nation	Position	Name	Premier League		Kazakhstan Cup		Super Cup		UEFA Europa Conference League		Total	
Number	Nation	Position	Name	Booked	Sent off (straight red)	Booked	Sent off (straight red)	Booked	Sent off (straight red)	Booked	Sent off (straight red)	Booked	Sent off (straight red)
1	(Kazakhstan)	GK	Bekkhan Shayzada	1	0	0	0	0	0	0	0	1	0
5	(Kazakhstan)	DF	Gafurzhan Suyumbayev	2	0	3	0	0	0	0	0	5	0
6	(Kazakhstan)	MF	Duman Narzildayev	0	0	0	0	0	0	1	0	1	0
7	(Uzbekistan)	MF	Shokhboz Umarov	3	0	1	0	0	0	0	0	4	0
8	(Kazakhstan)	MF	Askhat Tagybergen	3	0	0	0	0	0	2	0	5	0
9	(Kazakhstan)	MF	Bauyrzhan Islamkhan	3	0	0	0	0	0	0	0	3	0
11	(Kazakhstan)	MF	Maksim Fedin	4	0	3	0	0	0	0	0	7	0
19	(Ukraine)	MF	Yevheniy Makarenko	0	0	0	0	0	0	1	0	1	0
21	(Kazakhstan)	MF	Yerkebulan Tungyshbayev	3	0	1	0	0	0	0	0	4	0
22	(Kazakhstan)	MF	Sultanbek Astanov	0	0	2	0	0	0	1	0	3	0
23	(Kazakhstan)	DF	Temirlan Yerlanov	5	0	1	0	1	0	1	0	8	0
25	(Kazakhstan)	DF	Serhiy Malyi	8	1	0	0	0	0	1	0	9	1
26	(Senegal)	DF	Mamadou Mbodj	5	0	2	0	1	0	1	0	9	0
27	(Croatia)	MF	Bernardo Matić	2	0	0	0	0	0	0	0	2	0
29	(Belarus)	FW	Vsevolod Sadovsky	1	0	1	0	0	0	1	0	3	0
41	(Ukraine)	FW	Artem Byesyedin	3	0	0	0	0	0	0	0	3	0
45	(Uzbekistan)	FW	Bobur Abdikholikov	1	0	1	0	0	0	0	0	2	0
47	(Kazakhstan)	MF	Vladislav Vasilyev	2	0	0	0	0	0	0	0	2	0
96	(Brazil)	DF	Auro Jr.	2	0	1	0	0	0	0	0	3	0
Players away on loan:
Players who left Ordabasy during the season:
15	(Serbia)	MF	Radosav Petrović	3	0	3	1	0	0	0	0	6	1
			TOTALS	51	1	19	1	2	0	9	0	81	2
