= 2023 FC Astana season =

FC Astana
2023 season
- Chairman: Sayan Khamitzhanov
- Manager: Grigori Babayan
- Stadium: Astana Arena
- Premier League: 2nd
- Kazakhstan Cup: Semi-finals vs Ordabasy
- Super Cup: Winners
- Champions League: Second qualifying round vs Dinamo Zagreb
- Europa League: Third qualifying round Ludogorets Razgrad
- Europa Conference League: Group stage
- Top goalscorer: League: Abat Aymbetov (8); All: Dembo Darboe (11)
- Highest home attendance: 27,328 vs Dinamo Tbilisi (12 July 2023)
- Lowest home attendance: 500 vs Turan (17 May 2023)
- Average home league attendance: 6,002 (21 October 2023)
Home colours	Away colours

The 2023 FC Astana season was the fifteenth successive season that FC Astana will play in the Kazakhstan Premier League, the highest tier of association football in Kazakhstan.

== Season events ==
On 16 December 2022, Astana announced the signing of Dušan Jovančić from Tobol.

On 15 January, Astana announced the return of Žarko Tomašević from Tobol. Two days later, 17 January, Aleksa Amanović became the third player to join Astana from Tobol during the winter transfer window. Later the same day, Astana announced new contract with Sultan Sagnaev, Stanislav Basmanov, Vladislav Prokopenko, Talgat Kusyapov and Danil Podymsky.

On 26 January, Astana announced the signing of Josip Čondrić from Zrinjski Mostar, and the year-long loan signing of Dembo Darboe from Al-Nasr.

On 13 February, Astana announced the signing of Fabien Ourega from Žalgiris.

On 13 March, Astana announced the signing of Elkhan Astanov from Ordabasy.

On 21 March, Astana announced the return of free agent Varazdat Haroyan.

On 30 March, Astana announced the signing of Igor Ivanović from Shakhtyor Soligorsk.

On 4 July, Astana announced the singing of Yan Vorogovsky from RWD Molenbeek to a three-and-a-half-year contract.

On 11 July, Astana announced the singing of Aleksandr Marochkin from Tobol, and the loan signing of Stjepan Lončar from Ferencváros.

== Squad ==
As of match played 15 December 2023

No.	Name	Nationality	Position	Date of birth (age)	Signed from	Signed in	Contract ends	Apps.	Goals
Goalkeepers
31	Danil Podymksy	(Kazakhstan)	GK	13 May 1998 (aged 25)	Academy	2016		2	0
55	Aleksandr Zarutskiy	(Kazakhstan)	GK	26 August 1993 (aged 30)	Kaisar	2021	2023	44	0
93	Josip Čondrić	(Croatia)	GK	27 August 1993 (aged 30)	Zrinjski Mostar	2023		35	0
Defenders
3	Varazdat Haroyan	(Armenia)	DF	24 August 1992 (aged 31)	Unattached	2023		44	2
5	Mikhail Gabyshev	(Kazakhstan)	DF	2 January 1990 (aged 33)	Shakhter Karagandy	2022		23	1
6	Yan Vorogovsky	(Kazakhstan)	DF	7 August 1996 (aged 27)	RWD Molenbeek	2023	2026	18	0
13	Kamo Hovhannisyan	(Armenia)	DF	5 October 1992 (aged 31)	Kairat	2022	2023	64	2
15	Abzal Beysebekov	(Kazakhstan)	DF	30 November 1992 (aged 31)	Vostok	2012	2023	394	19
22	Aleksandr Marochkin	(Kazakhstan)	DF	14 July 1990 (aged 33)	Tobol	2023		18	1
33	Žarko Tomašević	(Montenegro)	DF	22 February 1990 (aged 33)	Tobol	2023		79	9
45	Aleksa Amanović	(North Macedonia)	DF	24 October 1996 (aged 27)	Tobol	2023		39	2
Midfielders
7	Max Ebong	(Belarus)	MF	26 August 1999 (aged 24)	Shakhtyor Soligorsk	2020	2023	112	8
8	Islambek Kuat	(Kazakhstan)	MF	12 January 1993 (aged 30)	Khimki	2021	2024	100	4
10	Marin Tomasov	(Croatia)	MF	31 August 1987 (aged 36)	Rijeka	2018		232	99
11	Aslan Darabayev	(Kazakhstan)	MF	21 January 1989 (aged 34)	Caspiy	2022		50	3
21	Elkhan Astanov	(Kazakhstan)	MF	21 May 2000 (aged 23)	Ordabasy	2023		31	4
23	Fabien Ourega	(France)	MF	7 December 1992 (aged 31)	Žalgiris	2023		39	1
27	Timur Dosmagambetov	(Kazakhstan)	MF	1 May 1989 (aged 34)	Shakhter Karagandy	2022		54	7
29	Dušan Jovančić	(Serbia)	MF	19 October 1990 (aged 33)	Tobol	2023		34	0
44	Stjepan Lončar	(Bosnia and Herzegovina)	MF	10 November 1996 (aged 27)	on loan from Ferencváros	2023		18	1
Forwards
17	Abat Aymbetov	(Kazakhstan)	FW	7 August 1995 (aged 28)	Krylia Sovetov	2022		91	29
20	Vladislav Prokopenko	(Kazakhstan)	FW	1 July 2000 (aged 23)	Academy	2016		61	6
72	Stanislav Basmanov	(Kazakhstan)	FW	24 June 2001 (aged 22)	Academy	2020		62	4
88	Dembo Darboe	(The Gambia)	FW	17 August 1998 (aged 25)	on loan from Al-Nasr	2023	2023	42	11
Youth team
47	Maksim Mamontov	(Kazakhstan)	DF	23 April 2004 (aged 19)	Academy	2022		0	0
52	Timur Tokenov	(Kazakhstan)	DF	24 April 2004 (aged 19)	Academy	2023		0	0
53	Andrey Berezutskiy	(Kazakhstan)	FW	30 January 2004 (aged 19)	Academy	2021		1	0
57	Akhmetali Kaltanov	(Kazakhstan)	MF	19 April 2006 (aged 17)	Academy	2023		0	0
60	Bekarys Kolbaev	(Kazakhstan)	FW	27 January 2003 (aged 20)	Ordabasy	2023		0	0
69	Dias Ispanov	(Kazakhstan)	FW	30 December 2003 (aged 19)	Academy	2022		0	0
71	Sanzhar Anuarov	(Kazakhstan)	DF	16 February 2005 (aged 18)	Academy	2023		0	0
74	Omirzhan Omarbek	(Kazakhstan)	FW	3 October 2005 (aged 18)	Academy	2023		0	0
76	Alibi Orazaly	(Kazakhstan)	DF	30 March 2004 (aged 19)	Akademia Ontustik	2023		0	0
78	Rakhimzhan Amangeldinov	(Kazakhstan)	MF	24 November 2005 (aged 18)	Academy	2023		0	0
79	Salamat Zhumabekov	(Kazakhstan)	MF	25 January 2004 (aged 19)	Academy	2022		6	0
80	Damir Elubaev	(Kazakhstan)	FW	6 April 2005 (aged 18)	Academy	2023		0	0
84	Alikhan Umbitaliev	(Kazakhstan)	MF	9 July 2001 (aged 22)	Academy	2022		1	0
85	Valikhan Tyulyupov	(Kazakhstan)	MF	10 February 2002 (aged 21)	Academy	2022		1	0
87	Sultan Abdykadyrov	(Kazakhstan)	DF	2 March 2002 (aged 21)	Academy	2022		0	0
89	Timur Nurmanov	(Kazakhstan)	MF	11 October 2004 (aged 19)	Academy	2023		0	0
90	Ruslan Kirgetov	(Kazakhstan)	FW	7 July 2002 (aged 21)	Academy	2022		3	0
91	Tamirlan Abuov	(Kazakhstan)	GK	13 September 2004 (aged 19)	Academy	2023		0	0
94	Yuri Akhanov	(Kazakhstan)	DF	31 July 2002 (aged 21)	Academy	2021		3	0
95	Nagda Bakizhev	(Kazakhstan)	GK	29 January 2002 (aged 21)	Academy	2022		0	0
96	Batyrkhan Mustafin	(Kazakhstan)	FW	26 March 2005 (aged 18)	Academy	2023		2	0
97	Nurali Zhaksylykov	(Kazakhstan)	FW	4 November 2004 (aged 19)	Academy	2023		10	1
99	Konstantin Onoprienko	(Kazakhstan)	GK	5 August 2003 (aged 20)	Academy	2022		0	0
Players away on loan
18	Sagi Sovet	(Kazakhstan)	DF	15 March 2000 (aged 23)	Academy	2016		22	0
30	Igor Ivanović	(Serbia)	MF	28 July 1997 (aged 26)	Shakhtyor Soligorsk	2023		9	1
32	Talgat Kusyapov	(Kazakhstan)	DF	14 February 1999 (aged 24)	Academy	2016		23	2
65	Meyrambek Kalmyrza	(Kazakhstan)	MF	15 December 2001 (aged 22)	Academy	2020		7	0
Left during the season
22	Sultan Sagnayev	(Kazakhstan)	MF	14 January 2000 (aged 23)	Academy	2016		50	2
43	Sanzhar Shurakhanov	(Kazakhstan)	DF	6 December 2001 (aged 22)	Academy	2021		4	0
56	Almas Zhanabek	(Kazakhstan)	MF	10 April 2002 (aged 21)	Academy	2021		0	0
63	Dias Kanatkali	(Kazakhstan)	DF	14 February 2001 (aged 22)	Academy	2021		4	0
66	Olzhas Adil	(Kazakhstan)	MF	1 April 2003 (aged 20)	Academy	2022		3	0
68	Makhmud Dunzurov	(Kazakhstan)	MF	22 March 2001 (aged 22)	Academy	2022		1	0
70	Nurzhan Shugay	(Kazakhstan)	MF	14 March 2004 (aged 19)	Academy	2023		0	0
82	Aydos Kumarov	(Kazakhstan)	DF	27 February 2002 (aged 21)	Academy	2021		1	0
89	Bauyrzhan Akhaev	(Kazakhstan)	DF	26 September 2001 (aged 22)	Academy	2021		5	0
98	Amir Tokushev	(Kazakhstan)	DF	21 April 2004 (aged 19)	Academy	2023		0	0

== Transfers ==
=== In ===
Date	Position	Nationality	Name	From	Fee	Ref.
1 January 2023	MF	(Serbia)	Dušan Jovančić	Tobol	Undisclosed	
15 January 2023	DF	(Montenegro)	Žarko Tomašević	Tobol	Free	
17 January 2023	DF	(North Macedonia)	Aleksa Amanović	Tobol	Free	
26 January 2023	GK	(Croatia)	Josip Čondrić	Zrinjski Mostar	Undisclosed	
13 February 2023	MF	(France)	Fabien Ourega	Žalgiris	Undisclosed	
13 March 2023	MF	(Kazakhstan)	Elkhan Astanov	Ordabasy	Undisclosed	
21 March 2023	DF	(Armenia)	Varazdat Haroyan	Unattached	Free	
30 March 2023	MF	(Serbia)	Igor Ivanović	Shakhtyor Soligorsk	Undisclosed	
4 July 2023	DF	(Kazakhstan)	Yan Vorogovsky	RWD Molenbeek	Undisclosed	
11 July 2023	DF	(Kazakhstan)	Aleksandr Marochkin	Tobol	Undisclosed	

=== Loans in ===
Date from	Position	Nationality	Name	From	Date to	Ref.
26 January 2023	FW	(The Gambia)	Dembo Darboe	Al-Nasr	End of season	
11 July 2023	MF	(Bosnia and Herzegovina)	Stjepan Lončar	Ferencváros	End of season	

=== Out ===
Date	Position	Nationality	Name	To	Fee	Ref.
1 July 2023	MF	(Kazakhstan)	Sultan Sagnayev	Maktaaral	End of season	

=== Loans out ===
Date from	Position	Nationality	Name	To	Date to	Ref.
6 February 2023	DF	(Kazakhstan)	Talgat Kusyapov	Caspiy	End of season	
3 March 2023	DF	(Kazakhstan)	Sagi Sovet	Okzhetpes	End of season	
3 March 2023	MF	(Kazakhstan)	Sultan Sagnayev	Aksu	30 June 2023	
25 July 2023	MF	(Serbia)	Igor Ivanović	Tobol	End of season	

=== Released ===
Date	Position	Nationality	Name	Joined	Date	Ref.
4 January 2023	DF	(Belarus)	Denis Polyakov	Hapoel Haifa		
6 January 2023	MF	(Kazakhstan)	Yury Pertsukh	Shakhter Karagandy	21 February 2023	
9 January 2023	DF	(Belarus)	Artsyom Rakhmanaw			
18 January 2023	MF	(France)	Jérémy Manzorro	Sandecja Nowy Sącz	14 March 2023	
19 January 2023	FW	(France)	Keelan Lebon	Neftçi	19 January 2023	
25 January 2023	MF	(Portugal)	Pedro Eugénio	Al-Adalah	25 January 2023	
15 May 2023	MF	(Kazakhstan)	Almas Zhanabek			
1 July 2023	MF	(Kazakhstan)	Nurzhan Shugay			
20 July 2023	MF	(Kazakhstan)	Aydos Kumarov			
25 July 2023	DF	(Kazakhstan)	Amir Tokushev			
1 August 2023	FW	(Kazakhstan)	Ruslan Kirgetov			
31 December 2023	GK	(Kazakhstan)	Nagda Bakizhev			
31 December 2023	GK	(Kazakhstan)	Danil Podymksy	Okzhetpes		
31 December 2023	DF	(Kazakhstan)	Sultan Abdykadyrov			
31 December 2023	DF	(Kazakhstan)	Alibi Orazaly			
31 December 2023	DF	(Kazakhstan)	Alikhan Umbitaliev			
31 December 2023	MF	(Kazakhstan)	Meyrambek Kalmyrza	Zhetysu	1 March 2024	
31 December 2023	MF	(Kazakhstan)	Timur Nurmanov			
31 December 2023	MF	(Kazakhstan)	Valikhan Tyulyupov			
31 December 2023	MF	(Kazakhstan)	Salamat Zhumabekov	Okzhetpes		
31 December 2023	MF	(Serbia)	Igor Ivanović	Tobol		
31 December 2023	FW	(Kazakhstan)	Dias Ispanov			
31 December 2023	FW	(Kazakhstan)	Bekarys Kolbaev			

== Friendlies ==
27 January 2023	Astana	0–0	CSKA Sofia	Antalya, Turkey
19:00 (UTC+6)		Report

5 February 2023	Astana	3–1	Buxoro	Antalya, Turkey
19 (UTC+6)	Goal	Report	Goal

8 February 2023	Astana	0–0	Vorskla Poltava	Antalya, Turkey
19:00 (UTC+6)		Report

11 February 2023	Astana	1–1	AGMK	Antalya, Turkey
(UTC+6)	Goal	Report	Goal

17 February 2023	Khimki	0–3	Astana	Antalya, Turkey
19:00 (UTC+6)	Rudenko (yellow card) 22'; Gudiyev (yellow card) 35'; Idowu (yellow card) 44'; Mirzov (yellow card) 67'; Marcos Guilherme (yellow card) 89'	Report	Ourega (yellow card); Hovhannisyan (yellow card) 43' (goal) 56'; Amanović (yellow card) 53'; Aymbetov 75', 89'

== Competitions ==
=== Overview ===
Competition	First match	Last match	Starting round	Final position	Record							
Competition	First match	Last match	Starting round	Final position	Pld	W	D	L	GF	GA	GD	Win %
Premier League	4 March 2023	29 October 2023	Matchday 1	2nd	26	16	5	5	36	23	+13	61.54
Kazakhstan Cup	19 April 2023	6 July 2023	Round of 16	Semifinal	6	4	1	1	11	4	+7	66.67
Super Cup	25 February 2023		Final	Winners	1	1	0	0	2	1	+1	100.00
Champions League	12 July 2023	2 August 2023	First Qualifying Round	Second Qualifying Round	4	1	1	2	3	8	−5	25.00
Europa League	10 August 2023	17 August 2023	Third Qualifying Round	Third Qualifying Round	2	1	0	1	3	6	−3	50.00
UEFA Europa Conference League	24 August 2022	15 December 2023	Playoff round	Group Stage	8	2	2	4	6	14	−8	25.00
Total					47	25	9	13	61	56	+5	53.19

Last updated: 15 December 2023
Source: Competitions

=== Super Cup ===
25 February 2023	Astana	2–1	Ordabasy	Astana
15:00 (UTC+6)	Amanović 8'; Darboe 38'; Ourega (yellow card) 51'	Report	Tungyshbayev 9'; Yerlanov (yellow card) 41'; Mbodj (yellow card) 67'	Stadium: Astana Arena; Attendance: 7,313; Referee: Daniyar Sakhi

=== Premier League ===
==== Results summary ====
Overall								Home						Away					
Pld	W	D	L	GF	GA	GD	Pts	W	D	L	GF	GA	GD	W	D	L	GF	GA	GD
24	14	5	5	29	21	+8	47	8	2	2	19	14	+5	6	3	3	10	7	+3

Last updated: 29 October 2023.
Source: See Results

==== Results by round ====
Round	1	2	3	4	5	6	7	8	9	10	11	12	13	14	15	16	17	18	19	20	21	22	23	24	25	26
Ground	H	A	H	H	A	H	A	H	A (Note: matchday 19)	A (Note: matchday 9)	H (Note: matchday 10)	A (Note: matchday 15)	A (Note: matchday 11)	H (Note: matchday 12)	H (Note: matchday 14)	A (Note: matchday 13)	H (Note: matchday 16)	A (Note: matchday 17)	A (Note: matchday 20)	A (Note: matchday 21)	H (Note: matchday 22)	A (Note: matchday 23)	H (Note: matchday 18)	A	H	A
Result	W	W	L	W	W	L	W	W	W	D	W	W	D	W	W	W	D	L	D	L	W	W	W	L	W	D
Position	3	3	7	5	2	4	2	2	1	2	1	1	1	1	1	1	2	2	3	3	3	2	2	2	2	2

Source: See Results
A = Away; H = Home; W = Win; D = Draw; L = Loss

==== Results ====
4 March 2023 1	Astana	2–1	Shakhter Karagandy	Astana
20:00 (UTC+6)	Prokopenko 3'; Darboe 21'; Tomasov (yellow card) 69'; Tomašević (yellow card) 86'	Report	Flyuk 33'; Tolordava (yellow card) 86'	Stadium: Astana Arena; Attendance: 3,500; Referee: Rustam Omarov

9 March 2023 2	Zhetysu	0–2	Astana	Almaty
14:00 (UTC+6)	Hasein (yellow card) 80'	Report	Darboe 69' (pen.); Beysebekov 77'	Stadium: Zhas Kyran Stadium; Attendance: 600; Referee: Bagdat Abdullaev

14 March 2023 3	Astana	1–4	Aktobe	Astana
21:00 (UTC+6)	Beysebekov 77'; Amanović (yellow card) 90+3'	Report	Samorodov 18'; Strumia (yellow card) 18'; Filipović 41', 50'; Penchikov (yellow card) 44'; Zhumabek 90+1'; Umayev (yellow card) 90+5'	Stadium: Astana Arena; Attendance: 9,500; Referee: Artem Kuchin

2 April 2023 4	Astana	2–0	Ordabasy	Astana
19:00 (UTC+6)	Tomasov 62'; Mbodj 71' (o.g.)	Report		Stadium: Astana Arena; Attendance: Alexander Zatula; Referee: 8,500

9 April 2023 5	Tobol	0–1	Astana	Kostanay
19:00 (UTC+6)	Gabarayev (yellow card) 88'	Report	Ourega (yellow card) 48'; Aymbetov (yellow card) 59'; Tomasov 70'; Ebong (yellow card) 73'; Dosmagambetov (yellow card) 87'	Stadium: Central Stadium; Attendance: 3,000; Referee: Grigory Moskovchenko

16 April 2023 6	Astana	0–3	Kairat	Astana
19:00 (UTC+6)	Darabayev (yellow card) 53'	Report	Paulo 3', 56'; Sergeyev 86'; Seydakhmet (yellow card) 88'	Stadium: Astana Arena; Attendance: 10,200; Referee: Daniyar Sakhi

23 April 2023 7	Kaisar	1–2	Astana	Kyzylorda
20:00 (UTC+6)	Kenesbek (yellow card) 45+1'; Sovpel (yellow card) 66'; Oliveira 78'; Baradzin (yellow card) 79'; Gorshunov (yellow card) 89'	Report	Tomašević 51'; Aymbetov 83'	Stadium: Gani Muratbayev Stadium; Attendance: 5,800; Referee: Saken Bayimbet

6 May 2023 8	Astana	2–0	Maktaaral	Astana
16:00 (UTC+6)	Astanov 8'; Aymbetov 29'; Ourega (yellow card) 57'; Jovančić (yellow card) 90'; Amanović (yellow card) 90+5'	Report	Karimov (yellow card) 39'; Tursynbay (yellow card) 67'	Stadium: Astana Arena; Attendance: 5,000; Referee: Danil Gorda

10 May 2023 19	Maktaaral	0–1	Astana	Shymkent
18:00 (UTC+6)	Abdurakhmanov (yellow card) 1' (yellow-red card) 60'; Tursynbay (red card) 13'; Dobay (yellow card) 28'; Potapov (yellow card) 87'	Report	Aymbetov 33'; Tomasov (yellow card) 39'; Kuat (yellow card) 85'	Stadium: Namys Stadium; Attendance: 1,700; Referee: Denis Tevyashov

14 May 2023 9	Okzhetpes	0–0	Astana	Kokshetau
15:00 (UTC+6)	Dimitrov (yellow card) 47'; Drachenko (yellow card) 77'; Abzalov (yellow card) 78'; Chagrov (yellow card) 90+5'	Report	Haroyan (yellow card) 23'; Ebong (yellow card) 31'; Amanović (yellow card) 90+6'	Stadium: Okzhetpes Stadium; Attendance: 1,000; Referee: Alexander Gauzer

20 May 2023 10	Astana	3–2	Kyzylzhar	Astana
16:00 (UTC+6)	Haroyan 17' (yellow card) 87'; Aymbetov 27'; Kuat (yellow card) 63'; Dosmagambetov (yellow card) 90+1'; Tomašević (yellow card) 90+4'; Astanov 90+7'	Report	Shadmanov (yellow card) 30'; Graf (yellow card) 38' (goal) 89' (pen.); Pernambuco 39'; Chikanchi (yellow card) 90+4'	Stadium: Astana Arena; Attendance: 6,500; Referee: Alexander Zatula

24 May 2023 15	Aksu	0–1	Astana	Pavlodar
20:00 (UTC+6)	Akhmetov (yellow card) 11'; Bryan (yellow card) 31'; Suley (yellow card) 47'	Report	Kuat (yellow card) 64'; Dosmagambetov 73'; Aymbetov (yellow card) 82'; Amanović (yellow card) 85'	Stadium: Central Stadium; Attendance: 5,150; Referee: Denis Izmailov
Note: Match originally scheduled for 15 July 2023.

28 May 2023 11	Atyrau	0–0	Astana	Atyrau
18:00 (UTC+6)	Nabikhanov (yellow card) 42'; Matheus (yellow card) 76'; Antanavičius (yellow card) 90+6'	Report	Ebong (yellow card) 65'; Basmanov (yellow card) 90+4'	Stadium: Munaishy Stadium; Attendance: 6,000; Referee: Daniyar Sakhi

3 June 2023 12	Astana	1–0	Aksu	Astana
20:00 (UTC+6)	Tomasov 32'; Haroyan (yellow card) 90+5'	Report	Osuchukwu (yellow card) 29'; Yesimov (yellow card) 38'; Obilor (yellow card) 90+5'	Stadium: Astana Arena; Attendance: 6,000; Referee: Elvira Nurmustafina

24 June 2023 14	Astana	3–1	Caspiy	Astana
18:00 (UTC+6)	Ourega 19'; Aymbetov 21'; Jovančić (yellow card) 36'; Gabyshev 66'	Report	Pantsulaia 55'; Kadyrbaev (yellow card) 70'	Stadium: Astana Arena; Attendance: 7,000; Referee: Denis Tevyashov

2 July 2023 13	Caspiy	1–2	Astana	Aktau
16:00 (UTC+6)	Podstrelov 66'; Narzildayev (yellow card) 90+2'	Report	Aymbetov 31'; Amanović (yellow card) 53'; Darboe 74' (pen.); Prokopenko (yellow card) 82'	Stadium: Zhastar Stadium; Attendance: 3,000; Referee: Rustam Omarov

22 July 2023 16	Astana	0–0	Atyrau	Astana
16:00 (UTC+6)		Report	Dzhumatov (yellow card) 35'; Takulov (yellow card) 72'; Zhagorov (yellow card) 90+7'	Stadium: Astana Arena; Attendance: 3,632; Referee: Artem Kuchin

29 July 2023 17	Kyzylzhar	1–0	Astana	Petropavl
16:00 (UTC+6)	Veselinović (yellow card) 34'; Podio (yellow card) 41'; Babakhanov (yellow card) 80'; Ospanov (yellow card) 89'	Report	Darboe (yellow card) 51'	Stadium: Karasai Stadium; Attendance: 2,000; Referee: Ruslan Sultangaliyev

20 August 2023 20	Astana	1–1	Kaisar	Astana
19:00 (UTC+6)	Amanović (yellow card) 8'; Dosmagambetov 68'	Report	Pryndeta (yellow card) 50'; Baradzin 88' (pen.)	Stadium: Astana Arena; Attendance: 4,000; Referee: Anton Kuchma

27 August 2023 21	Kairat	1–0	Astana	Almaty
19:00 (UTC+6)	Bagnack (yellow card) 39' (goal) 87'	Report	Zhaksylykov (yellow card) 41'; Jovančić (yellow card) 76'; Basmanov (yellow card) 85'	Stadium: Central Stadium; Attendance: 20,356; Referee: Daniyar Sakhi

16 September 2023 22	Astana	2–1	Tobol	Astana
19:00 (UTC+6)	Darboe 5'; Ourega (yellow card) 12'; Amanović 77'	Report	Muzhikov (yellow card) 78'; Déblé 90+1' (pen.)	Stadium: Astana Arena; Attendance: 7,500; Referee: Grigory Moskovchenko

24 September 2023 23	Ordabasy	1–2	Astana	Şymkent
19:00 (UTC+6)	Fedin 88' (pen.); Umarov (yellow card) 90+6'	Report	Darabayev 41'; Jovančić (yellow card) 51'; Zhaksylykov 60'	Stadium: Kazhymukan Munaitpasov Stadium; Attendance: 18,063; Referee: Bulat Sariev

27 September 2023 18	Astana	5–2	Okzhetpes	Astana
19:00 (UTC+6)	Aymbetov 8'; Tomasov 17', 25' (pen.), 90+4'; Darboe 89' (pen.)	Report	Tatayev 51'; Sarsenov 86' (pen.)	Stadium: Astana Arena; Attendance: 2,500; Referee: Grigory Moskovchenko
Note: Match originally scheduled for 5 August 2023, but postponed on 3 August 2023, due to Astana's participation in UEFA Europa League.

30 September 2023 24	Aktobe	2–0	Astana	Aktobe
19:00 (UTC+6)	Kasym 20' (pen.); Strumia (yellow card) 23'; China 77'; Filipović (yellow card) 88'; Pokatilov (yellow card) 90+4'	Report	Kuat (yellow card) 11'; Dosmagambetov (yellow card) 18'; Jovančić (yellow card) 80'	Stadium: Central Stadium; Attendance: 12,700; Referee: Artem Kuchin

21 October 2023 25	Astana	2–1	Zhetysu	Astana
16:00 (UTC+6)	Dosmagambetov 30'; Jovančić (yellow card) 67'; Aymbetov 90+6'	Report	Rušević 50'; Hasein (yellow card) 53'	Stadium: Astana Arena; Attendance: 4,200; Referee: Bagdat Abdullayev

29 October 2023 26	Shakhter Karagandy	1–1	Astana	Karaganda
17:00 (UTC+6)	Tattybayev 53'	Report	Shatsky 25' (o.g.)	Stadium: Shakhter Stadium; Attendance: 0 Referee: Daniyar Sakhi
Note: Match played behind closed doors due to the Kostenko mine disaster.

==== League table ====
Pos	Team	Pld	W	D	L	GF	GA	GD	Pts	Qualification or relegation
1	Ordabasy (C)	26	18	4	4	48	21	+27	58	Qualification for the Champions League first qualifying round
2	Astana	26	16	5	5	36	24	+12	53	Qualification for the Conference League second qualifying round
3	Aktobe	26	13	11	2	44	23	+21	50	Qualification for the Conference League first qualifying round
4	Kairat	26	12	8	6	44	32	+12	44	
5	Kyzylzhar	26	11	6	9	25	23	+2	39	

Source: UEFA, Soccerway
Rules for classification: 1) Points; 2) Goal difference; 3) Matches won; 4) Goals scored; 5) Away goals scored; 6) Head-to-head points; 7) Head-to-head matches won; 8) Head-to-head goal difference; 9) Head-to-head goals scored; 10) Head-to-head away goals scored; 11) Draw.
(C) Champions

=== Kazakhstan Cup ===
19 April 2023 Round of 16 1st leg	Astana	5–1	Kaisar	Astana
21:00 (UTC+6)	Darboe 11' (pen.), 16'; Tomašević 25'; Jovančić (yellow card) 36'; Astanov 55', 77'	Report	Makhan (yellow card) 23'; Sakhalbaev 57'; Kenesbek (yellow card) 74'	Stadium: Astana Arena; Attendance: 1,500; Referee: Sanjar Iskakov

30 April 2023 Round of 16 2nd leg	Kaisar	0–2 (1–7 agg.)	Astana	Kyzylorda
17:00 (UTC+6)	Pryndeta (yellow card) 30'; Pedro (yellow card) 45'; Sakhalbaev (yellow card) 81'	Report	Aymbetov 22'; Amanović (yellow card) 80'; Tomasov 90+4'	Stadium: Gani Muratbayev Stadium; Attendance: 3,800; Referee: Sayat Sulikanov

17 May 2023 Quarterfinal 1st leg	Astana	2–0	Turan	Astana
17:00 (UTC+6)	Darabayev (yellow card) 22'; Prokopenko 26', 39'; Zhaksylykov (yellow card) 40'	Report	Kakimov (yellow card) 44'	Stadium: Astana Arena; Attendance: 500; Referee: Sergey Nozhenko

7 June 2023 Quarterfinal 2nd leg	Turan	1–1 (1–3 agg.)	Astana	Shymkent
17:00 (UTC+6)	Kakimov (yellow card) 52'; Taipov (yellow card) 61'; Sultaniyazov 76'	Report	Darboe 29'	Stadium: Lokomotiv Stadium; Attendance: 200; Referee: Ruslan Sultangaliyev

28 June 2023 Semifinal 1st leg	Astana	1–0	Ordabasy	Astana
19:00 (UTC+6)	Dosmagambetov (yellow card) 21'; Darabayev (yellow card) 36'; Ivanović 73'	Report	S.Astanov (yellow card) 59'; Abdikholikov (yellow card) 83'	Stadium: Astana Arena; Attendance: 11,600; Referee: Saken Baiymbet

6 July 2023 Semifinal 2nd leg	Ordabasy	2–0 (2–1 agg.)	Astana	Shymkent
21:00 (UTC+6)	Umarov 63'; Mbodj (yellow card) 75'; Yerlanov 105'; Suyumbayev (yellow card) 116'	Report	Amanović (yellow card) 45+1'; Astanov (yellow card) 75'; Jovančić (yellow card) 77'; Beysebekov (red card) 112'	Stadium: Kazhymukan Munaitpasov Stadium; Referee: Alexander Gauser

=== UEFA Champions League ===
==== Qualifying rounds ====
12 July 2023 First qualifying round 1st leg	Astana (Kazakhstan)	1–1	(Georgia (country)) Dinamo Tbilisi	Astana, Kazakhstan
20:00 (UTC+6)	Aymbetov 11'	Report	Kalandadze (yellow card) 51'; Sigua 57'	Stadium: Astana Arena; Attendance: 27,328; Referee: Christian-Petru Ciochirca (Austria)

19 July 2023 First qualifying round 2nd leg	Dinamo Tbilisi (Georgia (country))	1–2 (2–3 agg.)	(Kazakhstan) Astana	Tbilisi, Georgia
22:00 (UTC+6)	Camara 22'	Report	Beysebekov 50'; Darboe 51'	Stadium: Boris Paichadze Dinamo Arena; Attendance: 10,736; Referee: Stuart Attwell (England)

26 July 2023 Second qualifying round 1st leg	Dinamo Zagreb (Croatia)	4–0	(Kazakhstan) Astana	Zagreb, Croatia
00:00 (UTC+6)	Petković 36'; Ivanušec 41', 43', 56'	Report	Vorogovsky (yellow card) 66'	Stadium: Stadion Maksimir; Attendance: 7,123; Referee: Guillermo Cuadra Fernández (Spain)

2 August 2023 Second qualifying round 2nd leg	Astana (Kazakhstan)	0–2 (0–6 agg.)	(Croatia) Dinamo Zagreb	Astana, Kazakhstan
22:00 (UTC+6)	Tomasov (yellow card) 45+2'; Jovančić (yellow card) 90+5'	Report	Marochkin 24' (o.g.); Marin 89'; Špikić (yellow card) 90+2'	Stadium: Astana Arena; Attendance: 26,978; Referee: Dennis Higler (Netherlands)

=== UEFA Europa League ===
==== Qualifying rounds ====
8 August 2023 Third qualifying round 1st leg	Astana (Kazakhstan)	2–1	(Bulgaria) Ludogorets Razgrad	Astana, Kazakhstan
20:00 (UTC+6)	Tomašević 40' (yellow card) 90+3'; Lončar (yellow card) 47'; Marochkin 53'; Beysebekov (yellow card) 66'	Report	Sonko Sundberg 34'; Gonçalves (yellow card) 47'; Verdon (yellow card) 87'	Stadium: Astana Arena; Attendance: 23,967; Referee: Horațiu Feșnic (Romania)

18 August 2023 Third qualifying round 2nd leg	Ludogorets Razgrad (Bulgaria)	5–1 (6–3 agg.)	(Kazakhstan) Astana	Razgrad, Bulgaria
00:00 (UTC+6)	Tekpetey 25', 50'; Piotrowski 47', 58'; Gonçalves (yellow card) 54'; Despodov 67'	Report	Ebong (yellow card) 27'; Darboe 29'; Aymbetov (yellow card) 34'; Jovančić (yellow card) 43' (yellow-red card) 77'	Stadium: Huvepharma Arena; Attendance: 5,469; Referee: Anthony Taylor (England)

=== UEFA Europa Conference League ===
==== Qualifying rounds ====
24 August 2023 Playoff Round 1st leg	Astana (Kazakhstan)	1–0	(Albania) Partizani	Astana, Kazakhstan
20:00 (UTC+6)	Lončar 41' (yellow card) 76'; Darboe (yellow card) 71'; Amanović (yellow card) 77'	Report	Sota (yellow card) 20'; Qirko (yellow card) 49'; Murataj (yellow card) 72'	Stadium: Astana Arena; Attendance: 18,634; Referee: Don Robertson (Scotland)

1 September 2023 Playoff Round 2nd leg	Partizani (Albania)	1–1 (1–2 agg.)	(Kazakhstan) Astana	Elbasan, Albania
00:00 (UTC+6)	Rrapaj (yellow card) 5'; Bintsouka 25'; Atanaskoski (yellow card) 32'	Report	Tomasov 46'; Ourega (yellow card) 90+2'; Vorogovsky (yellow card) 90+5'	Stadium: Elbasan Arena; Attendance: 6,000; Referee: Abdulkadir Bitigen (Turkey)
Note: Partizani played their home match at the Elbasan Arena in Elbasan, instead of their regular stadium, the Partizani Complex in Tirana, which did not meet UEFA requirements.

==== Group stage ====
Pos	Team	Pld	W	D	L	GF	GA	GD	Pts	Qualification
1	(Czech Republic) Viktoria Plzeň	6	6	0	0	9	1	+8	18	Advance to round of 16
2	(Croatia) Dinamo Zagreb	6	3	0	3	10	5	+5	9	Advance to knockout round play-offs
3	(Kazakhstan) Astana	6	1	1	4	4	13	−9	4 (Note: Ranked on head-to-head points: Astana 4, Ballkani 1.)	
4	(Kosovo) Ballkani	6	1	1	4	3	7	−4	4	

Source: UEFA
Rules for classification: Group stage tiebreakers
Notes:

22 September 2023 1	Dinamo Zagreb (Croatia)	5–1	(Kazakhstan) Astana	Zagreb, Croatia
01:00 (UTC+6)	Petković 43' (pen.), 53' (pen.); Bulat 58'; Šutalo (yellow card) 70'; Marin 85'; Halilović 90+3'	Report	Lončar (yellow card) 42'; Darboe (yellow card) 42'; Amanović (yellow card) 48'; Haroyan (yellow card) 52'; Hovhannisyan 78'	Stadium: Stadion Maksimir; Attendance: 10,005; Referee: Paweł Raczkowski (Poland)

5 October 2023 2	Astana (Kazakhstan)	1–2	(Czech Republic) Viktoria Plzeň	Astana, Kazakhstan
21:30 (UTC+6)	Haroyan (yellow card) 40'; Kuat (yellow card) 45+1'; Tomasov 51'; Marochkin (yellow card) 59'; Hovhannisyan (yellow card) 63'	Report	Chorý 54' (yellow card) 80'; Kopic 57'; Durosinmi (yellow card) 60'; Šulc (yellow card) 66'	Stadium: Astana Arena; Attendance: 24,421; Referee: Gustavo Correia (Portugal)

26 October 2023 3	Ballkani (Kosovo)	1–2	(Kazakhstan) Astana	Pristina, Kosovo
22:45 (UTC+6)	Kuč 8'; Dellova (yellow card) 68'; Hamidi (yellow card) 80'	Report	Hovhannisyan 7' (yellow card) 90+4'; Amanović (yellow card) 21'; Beysebekov 23' (yellow card) 90+2'; Ebong (yellow card) 77'	Stadium: Fadil Vokrri Stadium; Attendance: 7,208; Referee: Vasilios Fotias (Greece)
Note: Ballkani played their home matches at the Fadil Vokrri Stadium, in Pristina, instead of their regular stadium, the Theranda City Stadium, in Suva Reka, which did not meet UEFA requirements.

9 November 2023 4	Astana (Kazakhstan)	0–0	(Kosovo) Ballkani	Astana, Kazakhstan
21:30 (UTC+6)	Amanović (yellow card) 44'; Beysebekov (yellow card) 85'	Report	Hamidi (yellow card) 18'	Stadium: Astana Arena; Attendance: 15,337; Referee: Balázs Berke (Hungary)

30 November 2023 5	Astana (Kazakhstan)	0–2	(Croatia) Dinamo Zagreb	Astana, Kazakhstan
21:30 (UTC+6)	Darboe (penalty missed) 12'; Kuat (yellow card) 38'; Jovančić (yellow card) 59' (yellow-red card) 73'; Haroyan (yellow card) 74'	Report	Vidović 48'; Perić (yellow card) 72'; Kaneko 79'	Stadium: Astana Arena; Attendance: 20,313; Referee: John Beaton (Scotland)

15 December 2023 6	Viktoria Plzeň (Czech Republic)	3–0	(Kazakhstan) Astana	Plzeň, Czech Republic
02:00 (UTC+6)	Šulc (yellow card) 30'; Vlkanova 58'; Mosquera 67', 82'	Report	Tomašević (yellow card) 14'; Beysebekov (yellow card) 23'	Stadium: Doosan Arena; Attendance: 8,135; Referee: Willy Delajod (France)

== Squad statistics ==
As of match played 15 December 2023

=== Appearances and goals ===
No.	Pos	Nat	Player	Total		Premier League		Kazakhstan Cup		Super Cup		UEFA Champions League		UEFA Europa League		UEFA Europa Conference League	
No.	Pos	Nat	Player	Apps	Goals	Apps	Goals	Apps	Goals	Apps	Goals	Apps	Goals	Apps	Goals	Apps	Goals
3	DF	(Armenia) ARM	Varazdat Haroyan	29	1	19+1	1	2+2	0	0	0	1	0	0	0	2+2	0
5	DF	(Kazakhstan) KAZ	Mikhail Gabyshev	12	1	5+1	1	3	0	0	0	1	0	0+1	0	0+1	0
6	DF	(Kazakhstan) KAZ	Yan Vorogovsky	18	0	2+3	0	0+1	0	0	0	4	0	2	0	6	0
7	MF	(Belarus) BLR	Max Ebong	36	0	15+4	0	1+3	0	1	0	4	0	2	0	5+1	0
8	MF	(Kazakhstan) KAZ	Islambek Kuat	30	0	12+6	0	1+2	0	0+1	0	0	0	0+1	0	5+2	0
10	MF	(Croatia) CRO	Marin Tomasov	41	9	21+3	6	0+2	1	1	0	4	0	0+2	0	5+3	2
11	MF	(Kazakhstan) KAZ	Aslan Darabayev	20	1	10+4	1	3+1	0	0	0	0+1	0	0	0	0+1	0
13	DF	(Armenia) ARM	Kamo Hovhannisyan	38	2	15+3	0	3+2	0	1	0	2+2	0	2	0	8	2
15	DF	(Kazakhstan) KAZ	Abzal Beysebekov	35	4	15+2	2	3+2	0	1	0	3	1	1+1	0	6+1	1
17	FW	(Kazakhstan) KAZ	Abat Aymbetov	45	10	15+10	8	2+3	1	0+1	0	2+2	1	2	0	1+7	0
20	FW	(Kazakhstan) KAZ	Vladislav Prokopenko	21	3	8+5	1	6	2	1	0	1	0	0	0	0	0
21	MF	(Kazakhstan) KAZ	Elkhan Astanov	31	4	12+7	2	4	2	0	0	0+4	0	0+1	0	2+1	0
22	DF	(Kazakhstan) KAZ	Aleksandr Marochkin	18	1	2+4	0	0	0	0	0	3	0	2	1	7	0
23	MF	(France) FRA	Fabien Ourega	39	1	18+4	1	0+4	0	1	0	3	0	2	0	7	0
27	MF	(Kazakhstan) KAZ	Timur Dosmagambetov	37	3	15+4	3	6	0	0+1	0	0+4	0	0+2	0	2+3	0
29	MF	(Serbia) SRB	Dušan Jovančić	34	0	13+4	0	6	0	1	0	2+2	0	1+1	0	2+2	0
33	DF	(Montenegro) MNE	Žarko Tomašević	32	3	14+2	1	2+1	1	1	0	3	0	2	1	4+3	0
44	MF	(Bosnia and Herzegovina) BIH	Stjepan Lončar	18	1	5+2	0	0	0	0	0	1+1	0	2	0	4+3	1
45	DF	(North Macedonia) MKD	Aleksa Amanović	39	2	23	1	4+1	0	1	1	4	0	0	0	6	0
55	GK	(Kazakhstan) KAZ	Aleksandr Zarutskiy	12	0	7	0	5	0	0	0	0	0	0	0	0	0
72	FW	(Kazakhstan) KAZ	Stanislav Basmanov	20	0	5+9	0	5	0	0	0	0	0	0	0	0+1	0
79	MF	(Kazakhstan) KAZ	Salamat Zhumabekov	2	0	1+1	0	0	0	0	0	0	0	0	0	0	0
88	FW	(The Gambia) GAM	Dembo Darboe	42	11	10+11	5	4+2	3	1	1	2+2	1	2	1	8	0
93	GK	(Croatia) CRO	Josip Čondrić	35	0	19	0	1	0	1	0	4	0	2	0	8	0
94	DF	(Kazakhstan) KAZ	Yuri Akhanov	1	0	1	0	0	0	0	0	0	0	0	0	0	0
96	FW	(Kazakhstan) KAZ	Batyrkhan Mustafin	2	0	0+2	0	0	0	0	0	0	0	0	0	0	0
97	FW	(Kazakhstan) KAZ	Nurali Zhaksylykov	10	1	4+1	1	2+1	0	0	0	0	0	0	0	0+2	0
Players away from Astana on loan:
30	MF	(Serbia) SRB	Igor Ivanović	9	1	0+5	0	3+1	1	0	0	0	0	0	0	0	0
Players who left Astana during the season:

=== Goal scorers ===
Place	Position	Nation	Number	Name	Premier League	Kazakhstan Cup	Super Cup	UEFA Champions League	UEFA Europa League	UEFA Europa Conference League	Total
1	FW	(The Gambia)	88	Dembo Darboe	5	3	1	1	1	0	11
2	FW	(Kazakhstan)	17	Abat Aymbetov	8	1	0	1	0	0	10
3	MF	(Croatia)	10	Marin Tomasov	6	1	0	0	0	2	9
4	MF	(Kazakhstan)	21	Elkhan Astanov	2	2	0	0	0	0	4
4	DF	(Kazakhstan)	15	Abzal Beysebekov	2	0	0	1	0	1	4
6	MF	(Kazakhstan)	27	Timur Dosmagambetov	3	0	0	0	0	0	3
6	FW	(Kazakhstan)	20	Vladislav Prokopenko	1	2	0	0	0	0	3
6	DF	(Montenegro)	33	Žarko Tomašević	1	0	1	0	1	0	3
9	DF	(North Macedonia)	45	Aleksa Amanović	1	0	1	0	0	0	2
9	DF	(Armenia)	13	Kamo Hovhannisyan	0	0	0	0	0	2	2
9				Own goal	2	0	0	0	0	0	2
12	DF	(Armenia)	3	Varazdat Haroyan	1	0	0	0	0	0	1
12	MF	(France)	23	Fabien Ourega	1	0	0	0	0	0	1
12	DF	(Kazakhstan)	5	Mikhail Gabyshev	1	0	0	0	0	0	1
12	MF	(Kazakhstan)	11	Aslan Darabayev	1	0	0	0	0	0	1
12	FW	(Kazakhstan)	97	Nurali Zhaksylykov	1	0	0	0	0	0	1
12	MF	(Serbia)	30	Igor Ivanović	0	1	0	0	0	0	1
12	DF	(Kazakhstan)	22	Aleksandr Marochkin	0	0	0	0	1	0	1
12	MF	(Bosnia and Herzegovina)	44	Stjepan Lončar	0	0	0	0	0	1	1
				TOTALS	36	11	2	3	3	6	61

=== Clean sheets ===
Place	Position	Nation	Number	Name	Premier League	Kazakhstan Cup	Super Cup	UEFA Champions League	UEFA Europa League	UEFA Europa Conference League	Total
1	GK	(Croatia)	93	Josip Čondrić	9	0	0	0	0	2	11
2	GK	(Kazakhstan)	55	Aleksandr Zarutskiy	1	3	0	0	0	0	4
				TOTALS	10	3	0	0	0	2	15

=== Disciplinary record ===
Number	Nation	Position	Name	Premier League		Kazakhstan Cup		Super Cup		UEFA Champions League		UEFA Europa League		UEFA Europa Conference League		Total	
Number	Nation	Position	Name	Booked	Sent off (straight red)	Booked	Sent off (straight red)	Booked	Sent off (straight red)	Booked	Sent off (straight red)	Booked	Sent off (straight red)	Booked	Sent off (straight red)	Booked	Sent off (straight red)
3	(Armenia)	DF	Varazdat Haroyan	3	0	0	0	0	0	0	0	0	0	3	0	6	0
6	(Kazakhstan)	DF	Yan Vorogovsky	0	0	0	0	0	0	1	0	0	0	1	0	2	0
7	(Belarus)	MF	Max Ebong	3	0	0	0	0	0	0	0	1	0	1	0	5	0
8	(Kazakhstan)	MF	Islambek Kuat	4	0	0	0	0	0	0	0	0	0	2	0	6	0
10	(Croatia)	MF	Marin Tomasov	2	0	0	0	0	0	1	0	0	0	0	0	3	0
11	(Kazakhstan)	MF	Aslan Darabayev	1	0	2	0	0	0	0	0	0	0	0	0	3	0
13	(Armenia)	DF	Kamo Hovhannisyan	0	0	0	0	0	0	0	0	0	0	2	0	2	0
15	(Kazakhstan)	DF	Abzal Beysebekov	0	0	0	1	0	0	0	0	1	0	2	0	3	1
17	(Kazakhstan)	FW	Abat Aymbetov	2	0	0	0	0	0	0	0	1	0	0	0	3	0
20	(Kazakhstan)	FW	Vladislav Prokopenko	1	0	0	0	0	0	0	0	0	0	0	0	1	0
21	(Kazakhstan)	MF	Elkhan Astanov	0	0	1	0	0	0	0	0	0	0	0	0	1	0
22	(Kazakhstan)	DF	Aleksandr Marochkin	0	0	0	0	0	0	0	0	0	0	1	0	1	0
23	(France)	MF	Fabien Ourega	3	0	0	0	1	0	0	0	0	0	1	0	5	0
27	(Kazakhstan)	MF	Timur Dosmagambetov	3	0	1	0	0	0	0	0	0	0	0	0	4	0
29	(Serbia)	MF	Dušan Jovančić	6	0	2	0	0	0	1	0	1	1	2	1	13	2
33	(Montenegro)	DF	Žarko Tomašević	2	0	0	0	0	0	0	0	1	0	1	0	4	0
44	(Bosnia and Herzegovina)	MF	Stjepan Lončar	0	0	0	0	0	0	0	0	1	0	2	0	3	0
45	(North Macedonia)	DF	Aleksa Amanović	6	0	2	0	0	0	0	0	0	0	3	0	11	0
72	(Kazakhstan)	FW	Stanislav Basmanov	2	0	0	0	0	0	0	0	0	0	0	0	2	0
88	(The Gambia)	FW	Dembo Darboe	1	0	0	0	0	0	0	0	0	0	2	0	3	0
97	(Kazakhstan)	FW	Nurali Zhaksylykov	1	0	1	0	0	0	0	0	0	0	0	0	2	0
Players away on loan:
Players who left Astana during the season:
			TOTALS	40	0	9	1	1	0	3	0	7	1	23	1	83	3
