= 2023 Kazakhstan Super Cup =

Astana	Ordabasy
2	1
- Date: 25 February 2023
- Venue: Astana Arena, Astana
- Referee: Daniyar Sakhi
- Attendance: 7,313

The 2023 Kazakhstan Super Cup was the 14th Kazakhstan Super Cup, an annual football match played between the winners of the previous season's Premier League, Astana, and the winners of the previous season's Kazakhstan Cup, Ordabasy. The match was played on 25 February 2023, at the Astana Arena in Astana. Astana won the match 2–1 for their 6th Super Cup title, the first in 3 years.

== Background ==
Ordabasy won the Kazakhstan Cup for the second time after their match against Akzhayik in the final went to extra time after initially finishing 4–4. Elkhan Astanov then scored a 119th minute penalty to give Ordabasy the title. Astana won their Super Cup place by virtue of winning the 2022 Kazakhstan Premier League.

== Match details ==
25 February 2023
15:00 UTC+06:00

Astana	2 – 1	Ordabasy
Amanović 8'; Darboe 38' (pen.)	Report	Tungyshbayev 9'

Astana Arena, Astana
Attendance: 7,313
Referee: Daniyar Sakhi

Astana	Ordabasy

GK	93	(Croatia) Josip Čondrić
DF	13	(Armenia) Kamo Hovhannisyan
DF	15	(Kazakhstan) Abzal Beysebekov
DF	33	(Montenegro) Žarko Tomašević
DF	45	(North Macedonia) Aleksa Amanović
MF	7	(Belarus) Max Ebong
MF	10	(Croatia) Marin Tomasov
MF	23	(France) Fabien Ourega	(yellow card) 51'	(substituted off) 90+3'
MF	29	(Serbia) Dušan Jovančić		(substituted off) 68'
FW	20	(Kazakhstan) Vladislav Prokopenko		(substituted off) 79'
FW	88	(The Gambia) Dembo Darboe
Substitutes:
GK	31	(Kazakhstan) Danil Podymksy
GK	55	(Kazakhstan) Aleksandr Zarutskiy
DF	5	(Kazakhstan) Mikhail Gabyshev
MF	8	(Kazakhstan) Islambek Kuat		(substituted in) 68'
MF	11	(Kazakhstan) Aslan Darabayev
FW	17	(Kazakhstan) Abat Aymbetov		(substituted in) 90+3'
MF	27	(Kazakhstan) Timur Dosmagambetov		(substituted in) 79'
FW	53	(Kazakhstan) Andrey Berezutskiy
FW	72	(Kazakhstan) Stanislav Basmanov
MF	79	(Kazakhstan) Salamat Zhumabekov
MF	90	(Kazakhstan) Ruslan Kirgetov
Manager:
(Kazakhstan) Grigori Babayan

GK	74	(Kazakhstan) Mukhammedzhan Seysen
DF	5	(Kazakhstan) Gafurzhan Suyumbayev
DF	23	(Kazakhstan) Temirlan Yerlanov	(yellow card) 41'
DF	25	(Kazakhstan) Serhiy Malyi
DF	26	(Senegal) Mamadou Mbodj	(yellow card) 67'	(substituted off) 68'
DF	27	(Croatia) Bernardo Matić
MF	7	(Uzbekistan) Shokhboz Umarov		(substituted off) 58'
MF	8	(Kazakhstan) Askhat Tagybergen
MF	10	(Kazakhstan) Elkhan Astanov		(substituted off) 68'
MF	21	(Kazakhstan) Yerkebulan Tungyshbayev		(substituted off) 75'
FW	45	(Uzbekistan) Bobur Abdikholikov		(substituted off) 58'
Substitutes:
GK	1	(Kazakhstan) Bekkhan Shayzada
MF	11	(Kazakhstan) Maksim Fedin		(substituted in) 68'
MF	14	(Kazakhstan) Murojon Khalmatov
MF	15	(Serbia) Radosav Petrović		(substituted in) 68'
MF	17	(Kazakhstan) Akmal Bakhtiyarov		(substituted in) 75'
FW	20	(Kazakhstan) Batyrkhan Tazhibay
FW	29	(Belarus) Vsevolod Sadovsky		(substituted in) 58'
MF	47	(Kazakhstan) Vladislav Vasilyev
GK	51	(Kazakhstan) Kazhymukan Tolepbergen
MF	88	(Brazil) Victor Braga
FW	99	(Kazakhstan) Aybar Zhaksylykov		(substituted in) 58'
Manager:
(Belarus) Aleksandr Sednyov

== See also ==
- 2022 Kazakhstan Premier League
- 2022 Kazakhstan Cup
