= Abat Aymbetov =

Kazakhstani footballer

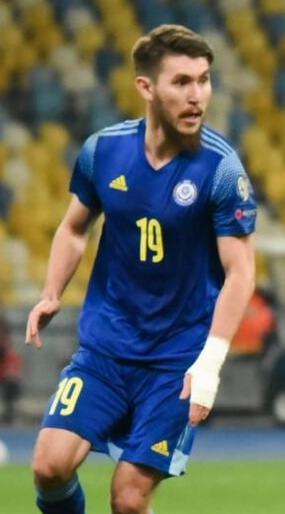

Personal information
- Full name: Abat Kayratuly Aymbetov
- Date of birth: 7 August 1995 (age 31)
- Place of birth: Kyzylorda, Kazakhstan
- Height: 1.84 m (6 ft 0 in)
- Position: Forward

Team information
- Current team: Aktobe
- Number: 95

Youth career
- –2012: Aktobe

Senior career*
Years	Team	Apps	(Gls)
2012–2020	Aktobe	109	(21)
2020–2021	Kairat	20	(10)
2021–2022	Krylia Sovetov	0	(0)
2021	→ Astana (loan)	14	(6)
2022–2024	Astana	44	(17)
2024–2025	Adana Demirspor	36	(6)
2025–2026	Petrolul Ploiești	9	(1)
2026–	Aktobe	8	(0)

International career^{‡}
2011	Kazakhstan U17	1	(0)
2014–2016	Kazakhstan U21	23	(7)
2019–	Kazakhstan	45	(9)
- * Club domestic league appearances and goals as of 1 November 2026 ‡ National team caps and goals as of 22 March 2025

Abat Kayratuly Aymbetov (Kazakh: Абат Қайратұлы Айымбетов; born 7 August 1995) is a Kazakh professional footballer who plays as a forward for Kazakhstan Premier League club Aktobe.

== Club career ==
=== Aktobe ===
Aymbetov made his Kazakhstan Premier League debut for Aktobe on 26 September 2012 in a game against Akzhayik.

=== Kairat ===
On 27 January 2020, Kairat announced the signing of Aymbetov to a one-year contract, with the option of a second.

=== Krylia Sovetov ===
On 21 February 2021, Krylia Sovetov announced the signing of Aymbetov. On 21 January 2022, his contract with Krylia Sovetov was terminated by mutual consent.

=== Astana ===
On 2 April 2021, Astana announced the signing of Aymbetov on loan from Krylia Sovetov until the summer transfer window. On 13 July 2021, the loan to Astana was extended until the end of 2021. In January 2022, Aymbetov returned to Astana for their first pre-season training camp in Turkey.

On 2 February 2024, Astana announced the departure of Aymbetov.

=== Adana Demirspor ===
On 5 February 2024, Süper Lig club Adana Demirspor announced the signing of Aymbetov to an 18-month contract.

== International career ==
Aymbetov made his Kazakhstan national football team debut on 8 June 2019 in a UEFA Euro 2020 qualifier against Belgium, as a 66th-minute substitute for Maxim Fedin.

He scored his first international goal more than a year later in his eighth selection against Belarus in the UEFA Nations League, although this did not prevent his team from finally being beaten on the score of 2–1.

== Career statistics ==
=== Club ===
As of match played 15 August 2026

Appearances and goals by club, season and competition
Club	Season	League			National cup (Note: Includes Kazakhstan Cup, Turkish Cup)		Continental		Other		Total	
Club	Season	Division	Apps	Goals	Apps	Goals	Apps	Goals	Apps	Goals	Apps	Goals
Aktobe	2012	Kazakhstan Premier League	6	0	3	0	0	0	—		9	0
Aktobe	2013	Kazakhstan Premier League	10	2	2	0	0	0	—		12	2
Aktobe	2014	Kazakhstan Premier League	13	0	3	1	4 (Note: Two appearances and one goal in UEFA Champions League, two appearances in UEFA Europa League)	1	0	0	20	2
Aktobe	2015	Kazakhstan Premier League	23	1	1	0	0	0	—		24	1
Aktobe	2016	Kazakhstan Premier League	2	0	1	0	0	0	—		3	0
Aktobe	2017	Kazakhstan Premier League	3	0	0	0	—		—		3	0
Aktobe	2018	Kazakhstan Premier League	23	2	0	0	—		—		23	2
Aktobe	2019	Kazakhstan Premier League	29	16	1	2	—		—		30	18
Aktobe	Total		109	21	11	3	4	1	0	0	124	25
Kairat	2020	Kazakhstan Premier League	20	10	—		2 (Note: Appearances in UEFA Europa League)	0	—		22	10
Astana (loan)	2021	Kazakhstan Premier League	14	6	7	2	2 (Note: Appearances in UEFA Europa Conference League)	1	—		23	9
Astana	2022	Kazakhstan Premier League	19	9	2	1	2	0	—		23	10
Astana	2023	Kazakhstan Premier League	25	8	5	1	14 (Note: Four appearances and one goal in UEFA Champions League, two appearances in UEFA Europa League, eight appearances in UEFA Europa Conference League)	1	1 (Note: Appearance in Kazakhstan Super Cup)	0	45	10
Astana	Total		58	23	14	4	18	2	1	0	91	29
Adana Demirspor	2023–24	Süper Lig	9	1	—		—		—		9	1
Adana Demirspor	2024–25	Süper Lig	27	5	1	0	—		—		28	5
Adana Demirspor	Total		36	6	1	0	—		—		37	6
Petrolul Ploiești	2025–26	Liga I	9	1	—		—		—		9	1
Aktobe	2026	Kazakhstan Premier League	5	0	—		—		—		5	0
Career total			237	61	26	7	24	3	1	0	288	71

=== International ===
As of match played 22 March 2025

Appearances and goals by national team and year
National team	Year	Apps	Goals
Kazakhstan
Kazakhstan	2019	6	0
Kazakhstan	2020	6	2
Kazakhstan	2021	5	0
Kazakhstan	2022	9	4
Kazakhstan	2023	9	3
Kazakhstan	2024	9	0
Kazakhstan	2025	1	0
Total		45	9

Scores and results list Kazakhstan's goal tally first, score column indicates score after each Aymbetov goal.

List of international goals scored by Abat Aymbetov
No.	Date	Venue	Opponent	Score	Result	Competition
1	7 September 2020	Central Stadium, Almaty, Kazakhstan	Belarus	1–1	1–2	2020–21 UEFA Nations League C
2	18 November 2020	Central Stadium, Almaty, Kazakhstan	Lithuania	1–0	1–2	2020–21 UEFA Nations League C
3	3 June 2022	Astana Arena, Nur-Sultan, Kazakhstan	Azerbaijan	1–0	2–0	2022–23 UEFA Nations League C
4	3 June 2022	Astana Arena, Nur-Sultan, Kazakhstan	Azerbaijan	2–0	2–0	2022–23 UEFA Nations League C
5	10 June 2022	Karađorđe Stadium, Novi Sad, Serbia	Belarus	1–0	1–1	2022–23 UEFA Nations League C
6	19 November 2022	Al Nahyan Stadium, Abu Dhabi, United Arab Emirates	United Arab Emirates	1–1	1–2	Friendly
7	26 March 2023	Astana Arena, Astana, Kazakhstan	Denmark	3–2	3–2	UEFA Euro 2024 qualification
8	19 June 2023	Windsor Park, Belfast, Northern Ireland	Northern Ireland	1–0	1–0	UEFA Euro 2024 qualification
9	17 November 2023	Astana Arena, Astana, Kazakhstan	San Marino	3–1	3–1	UEFA Euro 2024 qualification

== Honours ==
Aktobe

- Kazakhstan Premier League: 2013
- Kazakhstan Cup runner-up: 2014
- Kazakhstan Super Cup: 2014

Kairat

- Kazakhstan Premier League: 2020

Astana

- Kazakhstan Premier League: 2022
- Kazakhstan Super Cup: 2023
