= Dylan Ourega =

French footballer

Personal information
- Date of birth: 6 October 2004 (age 22)
- Place of birth: Villepinte, France
- Height: 1.83 m (6 ft 0 in)
- Position: Left-back

Team information
- Current team: Westerlo
- Number: 28

Youth career
- –2024: Metz

Senior career*
Years	Team	Apps	(Gls)
2022–2024	Metz B	47	(0)
2024–2026	Guingamp	27	(1)
2024–2025	Guingamp B	7	(0)
2026–	Westerlo	8	(1)
- * Club domestic league appearances and goals as of 1 June 2026

Dylan Ourega (born 6 October 2004) is a French professional footballer who plays as a left-back for Belgian Pro League club Westerlo.

== Career ==
Ourega is a youth product of Metz. He joined Guingamp in July 2024. On 18 October 2024, he made his Ligue 2 debut against Pau. He scored his first professional goal on 17 October 2025 against Boulogne. On 21 January 2026, he signed for Belgian Pro League side Westerlo.

== Personal life ==
Dylan's older brother Fabien Ourega is also a footballer.
