= Vladislav Vasilyev (footballer, born 1997) =

Kazakhstani footballer

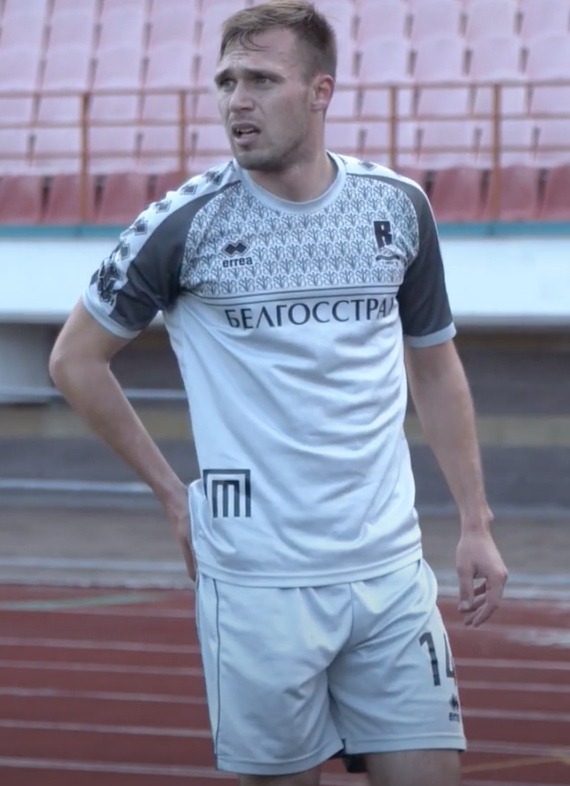
- Vasilyev with Rukh Brest in 2020

Personal information
- Full name: Vladislav Andreyevich Vasilyev
- Date of birth: 10 April 1997 (age 29)
- Place of birth: Karagandy, Kazakhstan
- Height: 1.80 m (5 ft 11 in)
- Position: Midfielder

Team information
- Current team: Okzhetpes
- Number: 47

Youth career
- 2013–2015: Shakhter Karagandy

Senior career*
Years	Team	Apps	(Gls)
2015–2017	Shakhter Karagandy	23	(1)
2016–2017	→ Shakhter-M Karagandy	11	(10)
2016–2017	→ Shakhter-Bolat Temirtau (loan)	15	(5)
2018–2019	Energetik-BGU Minsk	43	(12)
2019–2020	Dinamo Brest	8	(0)
2020	→ Rukh Brest (loan)	26	(8)
2021	Energetik-BGU Minsk	16	(5)
2021	→ Andijon (loan)	8	(1)
2022	Tobol	22	(1)
2023–2024	Ordabasy	14	(1)
2024	Dinamo Minsk	2	(0)
2024	Minsk	14	(0)
2025	Dinamo Brest	12	(0)
2025–2026	Irtysh Pavlodar	13	(4)
2026–	Okzhetpes	1	(0)

International career^{‡}
2013	Kazakhstan U17	2	(0)
2015	Kazakhstan U19	3	(0)
2020–	Kazakhstan	12	(0)
- * Club domestic league appearances and goals as of 15 March 2026 ‡ National team caps and goals as of 30 June 2022

Vladislav Andreyevich Vasilyev (Russian: Владислав Андреевич Васильев; born 10 April 1997) is a Kazakhstani professional footballer who plays for Kazakhstan Premier League club Okzhetpes.
