= Bernardo Matić =

Croatian footballer (born 1994)

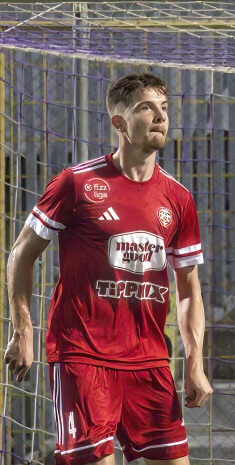
- Matić playing for Kisvárda in 2025

Personal information
- Date of birth: 27 July 1994 (age 32)
- Place of birth: Sinj, Croatia
- Height: 1.94 m (6 ft 4 1/2 in)
- Positions: Centre-back; defensive midfielder

Team information
- Current team: Kisvárda
- Number: 4

Youth career
- 2004–2005: Junak Sinj
- 2005–2008: Hajduk Split
- 2008–2009: Glavice
- 2009–2012: Junak Sinj

Senior career*
Years	Team	Apps	(Gls)
2012–2013	Junak Sinj	24	(0)
2013–2017	Zagreb	68	(3)
2017–2018	Rijeka	0	(0)
2017–2018	→ Široki Brijeg (loan)	23	(4)
2018–2020	Široki Brijeg	44	(4)
2020–2021	Racing de Santander	16	(1)
2021–2022	Istra 1961	5	(1)
2022–2023	Šibenik	10	(1)
2023–2024	Ordabasy	22	(2)
2024–	Kisvárda	41	(7)
2024	Kisvárda II	12	(0)

International career
2013	Croatia U19	2	(0)
2015	Croatia U21	1	(0)
- * Club domestic league appearances and goals as of 19 January 2026

Bernardo Matić (born 27 July 1994) is a Croatian professional footballer who plays for Nemzeti Bajnokság I club Kisvárda.

== Club career ==
Having passed through the ranks of hometown club Junak Sinj and Hajduk Split youth academy, Matić made his professional debut for Junak during the 2011–12 1. HNL season. In the summer of 2013, he joined Zagreb. On 17 February 2017, he signed a 1 1/2-year deal with Rijeka, which tied him with the club until June 2018.

In July 2017, Matić was loaned to Bosnian Premier League club Široki Brijeg. In June 2018, he signed a two-year contract with Široki Brijeg.

On 11 October 2020, Matić left Široki Brijeg and signed a contract with Spanish Segunda División B club Racing de Santander.

In February 2023, he moved to Ordabasy in Kazakhstan.

On 15 January 2024, Matić signed with Kisvárda in Hungary.

== International career ==
Matić was capped for both the Croatia U19 and U21 national teams.

== Career statistics ==
Club	Season	League			Cup		Continental		Other		Total	
Club	Season	Division	Apps	Goals	Apps	Goals	Apps	Goals	Apps	Goals	Apps	Goals
Junak Sinj	2011–12	2. HNL	2	0	–		–		–		2	0
Junak Sinj	2012–13	2. HNL	22	0	–		–		–		22	0
NK Zagreb	2013–14	2. HNL	22	2	2	0	–		–		24	2
NK Zagreb	2014–15	1. HNL	20	1	1	0	–		–		21	1
NK Zagreb	2015-16	1. HNL	24	0	2	0	–		–		26	0
NK Zagreb	2016–17	2. HNL	2	0	0	0	–		–		2	0
Rijeka	2016–17	1. HNL	0	0	0	0	–		–		0	0
Široki Brijeg (on loan)	2017–18	PL BiH	23	4	3	1	2	0	–		28	5
Široki Brijeg	2018–19	PL BiH	23	3	3	0	2	1	–		28	4
Široki Brijeg	2019–20	PL BiH	18	1	1	0	2	0	–		21	1
Široki Brijeg	2020–21	PL BiH	3	0	0	0	0	0	–		3	0
Racing de Santander	2020–21	2ª División B	11	0	1	0	-		5	1	17	1
Istra 1961	2021–22	1. HNL	5	1	0	0	-		-		5	1
Career total			175	12	13	1	6	1	5	1	199	15

== Honours ==
Zagreb

- 2. HNL: 2013–14

Rijeka

- 1. HNL: 2016–17
- Croatian Cup: 2016–17
