= Aleksa Amanović =

Macedonian footballer

Personal information
- Date of birth: 24 October 1996 (age 30)
- Place of birth: Belgrade, FR Yugoslavia (now Serbia)
- Height: 1.87 m (6 ft 2 in)
- Position: Defender

Team information
- Current team: Ordabasy
- Number: 55

Youth career
- Partizan

Senior career*
Years	Team	Apps	(Gls)
2014–2015	Partizan	0	(0)
2014–2015	→ Teleoptik (loan)	0	(0)
2015	IMT	10	(0)
2016–2019	Javor Ivanjica	121	(3)
2020–2022	Tobol	63	(4)
2023–2026	Astana	68	(3)
2026–	Ordabasy	28	(0)

International career
2014	Macedonia U19	3	(0)
2014–2018	Macedonia U21	10	(2)
- * Club domestic league appearances and goals as of 13:59, 31 October 2026 (UTC)

Aleksa Amanović (Macedonian: Алекса Амановиќ; born 24 October 1996) is a Macedonian professional footballer who plays as a defender for Kazakhstan Premier League club Ordabasy.

== Club career ==
Amanović is product of Partizan's academy where he played until he made his senior debut in the 2014–15 season playing on loan at Partizan's satellite team Teleoptik.

After playing half season with IMT in the Serbian League Belgrade, Amanović signed with Javor Ivanjica during the winter-break of the 2015–16 Serbian SuperLiga season.

=== Kazakhstan ===
On 17 February 2020, Tobol announced the signing of Amanović to a one-year contract, with the option of an additional year. On 15 January 2023, Tobol announced the departure of Amanović. Two days later, 17 January 2023, Amanović signed for Astana.

== International career ==
He played for Macedonia U19 and U21 national teams.

== Honours ==
Tobol

- Kazakhstan Premier League: 2021
- Kazakhstan Super Cup: 2022

Astana

- Kazakhstan Super Cup: 2023

Ordabasy

- Kazakhstan Premier League: 2026
- Kazakhstan Cup: 2026
