= Bobur Abdikholikov =

Uzbek footballer (born 1997)

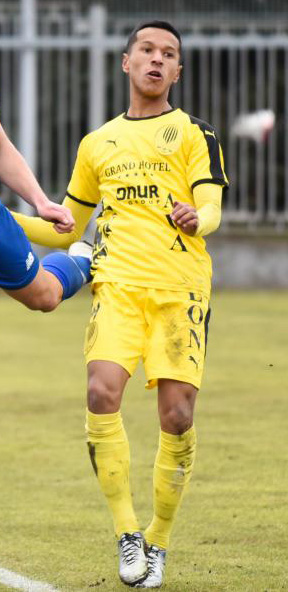
- Bobur Abdikholikov playing for Rukh Lviv U-21 in 2021

Personal information
- Full name: Bobur Alisher oʻgʻli Abduholiqov
- Date of birth: 23 April 1997 (age 29)
- Place of birth: Koson, Uzbekistan
- Height: 1.77 m (5 ft 10 in)
- Position: Forward

Team information
- Current team: Nasaf
- Number: 10

Youth career
- 2012–2015: Nasaf

Senior career*
Years	Team	Apps	(Gls)
2015–2020	Nasaf	112	(45)
2021	Rukh Lviv	0	(0)
2021–2022	Energetik-BGU Minsk	44	(28)
2023	Ordabasy	26	(7)
2024	Nasaf	23	(5)
2025	Sumgayit	13	(4)
2025	Pakhtakor	10	(1)
2026–	Nasaf	14	(6)

International career^{‡}
2016	Uzbekistan U19	3	(1)
2017–2020	Uzbekistan U23	40	(21)
2018–	Uzbekistan	8	(1)
Medal record
Representing Uzbekistan
Men's football
AFC U-23 Championship
Winner	2018 China	Team
CAFA Nations Cup
Runner-up	2023 Kyrgyzstan–Uzbekistan	Team
- * Club domestic league appearances and goals as of 29 July 2026 ‡ National team caps and goals as of 13 September 2023

Bobur Abdikholikov (Uzbek: Bobur Alisher oʻgʻli Abduholiqov, Бобур Алишер ўғли Абдуҳолиқов; born 23 April 1997) is an Uzbekistani footballer who plays as a forward for Nasaf and Uzbekistan national football team.

== Club career ==
On 19 February 2025, Azerbaijan Premier League club Sumgayit announced the signing of Abdikholikov on a contract until the end of 2024–25 season with the option of an additional year. On 25 June 2025, Sumgayit announced that they hadn't taken up the option of the additional year on Abdikholikov's contract and he had left the club.

On 9 July 2025, Pakhtakor announced the signing of Abdikholikov on a contract until the end of the year. He made his first-team debut on 1 August 2025, in a 1–0 O‘zbekiston Superligasi guest win against PFK Mashʻal, replacing Igor Sergeyev after 86 minutes.

== International career ==
In May 2017, Bobur played for the first time for the Uzbekistan national under-23 football team. In January 2018, together with the national team, he won the AFC U-23 Asian Cup in China, where he played in all the matches of his team, but mostly took to the field at the end of the matches, where he played together with the team captain Zabikhillo Urinboev. In the same year, at the Asian Games, he scored 1 goal in 4 matches. The following year, he remained the main player under the guidance of coach Ravshan Khaydarov, and also went to the Asian Youth Championship 2020, where he scored 1 goal in 6 matches. He scored more than 20 goals for the team, thanks to which he became one of the top scorers in this age category in the recent history of Uzbekistan.

Abdikholikov made his debut for the Uzbekistan on 8 June 2018, in their 3–0 friendly defeat to Uruguay, in which he replaced Zabikhillo Urinboev in the second half.

== Career statistics ==
=== Club ===
As of match played 30 June 2024

Appearances and goals by club, season and competition
Club	Season	League			National Cup		League Cup		Continental		Other		Total	
Club	Season	Division	Apps	Goals	Apps	Goals	Apps	Goals	Apps	Goals	Apps	Goals	Apps	Goals
Nasaf	2015	Uzbekistan Super League	1	0	3	2	—		—		—		4	2
Nasaf	2016	Uzbekistan Super League	18	4	5	2	—		6 (Note: Appearances and goals in the AFC Champions League)	2	—		29	8
Nasaf	2017	Uzbekistan Super League	21	8	2	0	—		2	0	—		25	8
Nasaf	2018	Uzbekistan Super League	27	13	1	0	—		7	2	—		35	15
Nasaf	2019	Uzbekistan Super League	20	3	4	1	0	0	0	0	—		24	4
Nasaf	2020	Uzbekistan Super League	25	17	3	0	—		—		—		28	17
Nasaf	2024	Uzbekistan Super League	11	3	3	0			2	0	1	0	17	3
Nasaf	Total		123	48	21	5	0	0	17	4	1	0	163	57
Rukh Lviv	2020–21	Ukrainian Premier League	0	0	0	0	—		—		—		0	0
FC Energetik-BGU Minsk	2021	Belarusian Premier League	14	2	1	0	—		—		—		15	2
FC Energetik-BGU Minsk	2022	Belarusian Premier League	30	26	2	1	—		—		—		32	27
FC Energetik-BGU Minsk	Total		44	28	3	1	-	-	-	-	-	-	47	29
Ordabasy	2023	Kazakhstan Premier League	21	6	6	1	—		2	0	1 (Note: Appearances and goals in the Kazakhstan Super Cup)	0	5	2
Career total			188	82	30	7	0	0	19	4	2	0	239	93

=== International ===
Uzbekistan national team
Year	Apps	Goals
2018	1	0
2019	0	0
2020	2	0
2021	0	0
2022	1	0
2023	4	1
Total	8	1

Statistics accurate as of match played 13 September 2023

List of international goals scored by Bobur Abdikholikov
No.	Date	Venue	Opponent	Score	Result	Competition
1	13 September 2023	Mercedes-Benz Stadium, Atlanta, United States	Mexico	1–0	3–3	Friendly
