= Shokhboz Umarov =

Uzbek footballer (born 1999)

Personal information
- Full name: Shokhboz Khusniddin o'g'li Umarov
- Date of birth: 9 March 1999 (age 27)
- Place of birth: Tashkent, Uzbekistan
- Height: 1.80 m (5 ft 11 in)
- Position: Midfielder

Team information
- Current team: Okzhetpes
- Number: 17

Senior career*
Years	Team	Apps	(Gls)
2018–2019	AGMK	3	(0)
2020	Energetik-BGU Minsk	30	(4)
2021–2022	BATE Borisov	27	(6)
2022	→ Ordabasy (loan)	9	(0)
2023–2024	Ordabasy	43	(5)
2025	Turan	10	(1)
2025	Tobol	5	(0)
2026	Bunyodkor	4	(0)
2026–	Okzhetpes	16	(1)

International career^{‡}
2021–	Uzbekistan	5	(0)
- * Club domestic league appearances and goals as of 1 November 2026 ‡ National team caps and goals as of 3 February 2024

Shokhboz Khusniddin O'g'li Umarov (born 9 March 1999) is an Uzbek professional footballer who plays as a midfielder for Okzhetpes.

== Club career ==
He was born in Tashkent. He started his senior football career in 2018 as a member of AGMK, making his debut on November 4, 2018 in a away Uzbekistan Super League match against Sogdiana. Shokhboz came in the 76th minute, replacing Zohir Pirimov. In the 2018 season, he played 1 match for the capital club, the following season he played 2 matches in the Super League and 1 in the Uzbekistan Cup. At the beginning of 2020 he moved to Belarus, where he signed a contract until the end of the season with Energetik-BGU. He made his debut on 19 March 2020 in a home match against BATE Borisov. He scored his debut goal in the Premier League on 31 May 2020 in a home match of against Vitebsk.

On 15 July 2020, Umarov signed a contract with BATE Borisov, which became effective on 1 January 2021.

== International career ==
He made his debut for the Uzbekistan national football team on 9 October 2021 in a friendly against Malaysia.

== Honours ==
AGMK

- Uzbekistan Cup: 2018

Ordabasy

- Kazakhstan Premier League: 2023
