= Dušan Jovančić =

Serbian footballer

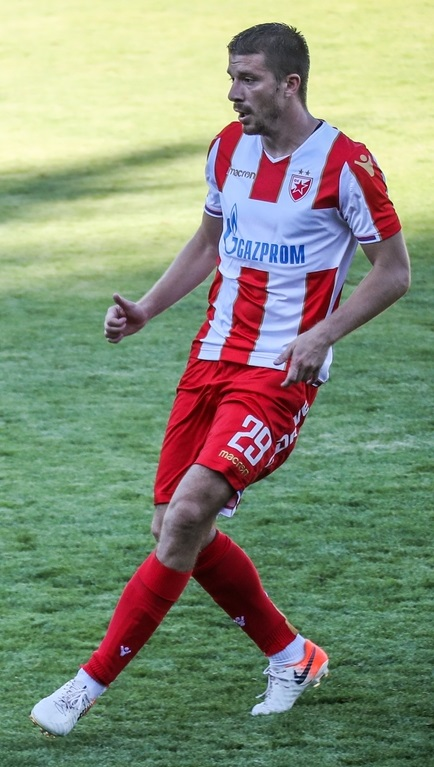

Personal information
- Full name: Dušan Jovančić
- Date of birth: 19 October 1990 (age 36)
- Place of birth: Belgrade, SFR Yugoslavia
- Height: 1.86 m (6 ft 1 in)
- Position: Defensive midfielder

Team information
- Current team: Mladost Lučani
- Number: 29

Senior career*
Years	Team	Apps	(Gls)
2008–2010	BPI Slavija	31	(3)
2010	→ Šumadija Jagnjilo (loan)	5	(0)
2010–2011	Šumadija Jagnjilo	22	(1)
2011–2012	Zemun	23	(6)
2012–2016	Borac Čačak	88	(1)
2016–2018	Vojvodina	67	(5)
2018–2020	Red Star Belgrade	41	(2)
2020–2021	Çaykur Rizespor	4	(0)
2021	→ Tobol (loan)	17	(0)
2021–2022	Tobol	24	(3)
2023–2025	Astana	17	(0)
2024	→ Kifisia (loan)	7	(1)
2024	→ Kyzylzhar (loan)	11	(0)
2025–2026	Čukarički	32	(1)
2026–	Mladost Lučani	0	(0)
- * Club domestic league appearances and goals as of 12 June 2026

Dušan Jovančić (Serbian Cyrillic: Душан Јованчић; born 19 October 1990) is a Serbian professional footballer who plays as a defensive midfielder for Serbian SuperLiga club Mladost Lučani.

== Career ==
=== Borac Čačak ===
Jovančić joined Borac Čačak in 2012 at the invitation of club director Slobodan Ilić, who noticed him after he played for the amateur selection of the Football Federation of Belgrade. On 2 December 2015 Jovančić played for Borac Čačak in a 1-5 upset which eliminated heavily favored Red Star Belgrade in the second round of the 2015-16 Serbian Cup. He played a total of 88 games and scored one goal playing for Borac Čačak from 2012 to 2016.

=== Vojvodina ===
Jovančić signed a two-year contract with Vojvodina in January 2016. In January 2018, he signed a half-season extension, rejecting an offer from Partizan. By the time he left Vojvodina, he had played as the team captain.

=== Red Star Belgrade ===
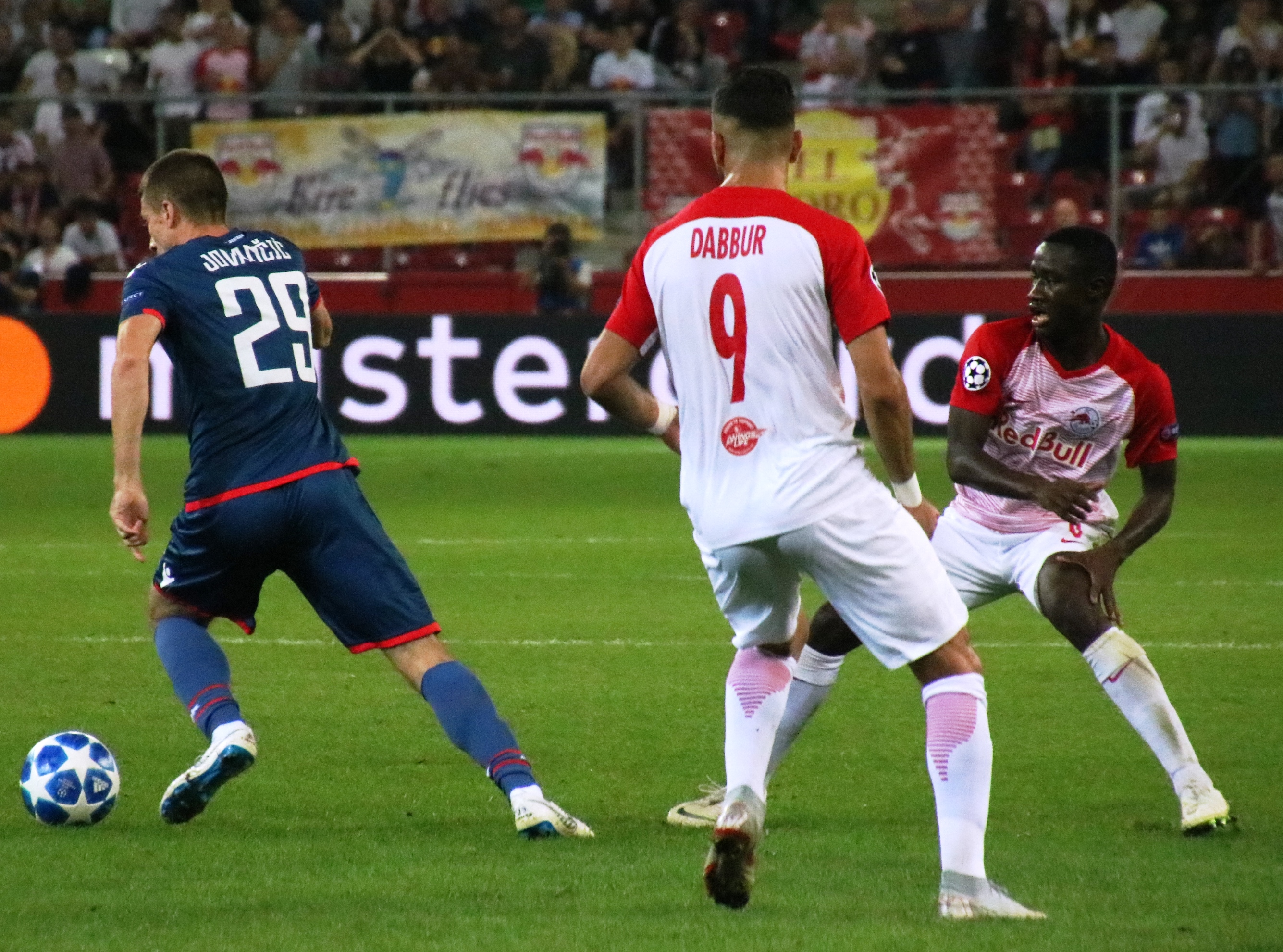
Jovančić in action for Red Star Belgrade in 2018 against Red Bull Salzburg

On 29 May 2018 Jovančić signed a two-year contract with Red Star Belgrade, with an optional one-year extension. He was signed as a replacement for Mitchell Donald, who had been one of Red Star's defensive midfielders. On 6 November 2018, he injured his hamstring in a 2–0 win against Liverpool in the Champions League.

=== Astana ===
On 16 December 2022, Astana announced the signing of Jovančić.

==== Kyzylzhar loan ====
On 6 December 2024, Kyzylzhar announced that Jovančić had returned to Astana after his loan had expired.

=== Čukarički ===
On 5 January 2025, Jovančić returned to his native Serbia, joining Čukarički on a one-year deal.

== Personal life ==
On 22 June 2020 he tested positive for COVID-19.

== Career statistics ==
As of 19 June 2022

Appearances and goals by club, season and competition
Club	Season	League			Cup		Continental		Other		Total	
Club	Season	Division	Apps	Goals	Apps	Goals	Apps	Goals	Apps	Goals	Apps	Goals
Šumadija Jagnjilo	2009–10 (loan)	Serbian League Belgrade	5	0	0	0	—		—		5	0
Šumadija Jagnjilo	2010–11	Serbian League Belgrade	22	1	0	0	—		—		22	1
Šumadija Jagnjilo	Total		27	1	0	0	—		—		27	1
Zemun	2011–12	Serbian League Belgrade	23	6	0	0	—		—		23	6
Borac	2011–12	Serbian First League	21	1	3	0	—		—		24	1
Borac	2013–14	Serbian First League	19	0	2	0	—		—		21	0
Borac	2014–15	Serbian SuperLiga	27	0	0	0	—		—		27	0
Borac	2015–16	Serbian SuperLiga	21	0	1	0	—		—		22	0
Borac	Total		88	1	6	0	—		—		94	1
Vojvodina	2015–16	Serbian SuperLiga	9	0	1	0	0	0	—		10	0
Vojvodina	2016–17	Serbian SuperLiga	25	2	4	1	6	0	—		35	3
Vojvodina	2017–18	Serbian SuperLiga	33	3	3	0	2	0	—		38	3
Vojvodina	Total		67	5	8	1	8	0	—		83	6
Red Star Belgrade	2018–19	Serbian SuperLiga	27	2	3	0	10	0	—		40	2
Red Star Belgrade	2019–20	Serbian SuperLiga	14	0	3	0	10	1	—		27	1
Red Star Belgrade	2020–21	Serbian SuperLiga	0	0	0	0	1	0	—		1	0
Red Star Belgrade	Total		41	2	6	0	21	1	—		68	3
Çaykur Rizespor	2020–21	Süper Lig	4	0	3	0	0	0	—		7	0
Tobol	2021 (loan)	Kazakhstan Premier League	17	0	7	0	4 (Note: Appearances and goal in the UEFA Europa Conference League)	1	2 (Note: Appearance in Kazakhstan Super Cup)	0	30	1
Tobol	2022	Kazakhstan Premier League	24	3	1	0	6 (Note: Two appearances in the UEFA Champions League, and four appearances in the UEFA Europa League)	0	1	0	32	3
Tobol	Total		41	3	8	0	10	1	3	0	62	4
Career total			291	18	31	1	39	2	3	0	364	21

== Honours ==
Red Star Belgrade

- Serbian SuperLiga: 2018–19, 2019–20

Tobol

- Kazakhstan Premier League: 2021

Individual

- Serbian SuperLiga Team of the Season: 2018–19
