= Fabien Ourega =

French footballer (born 1992)

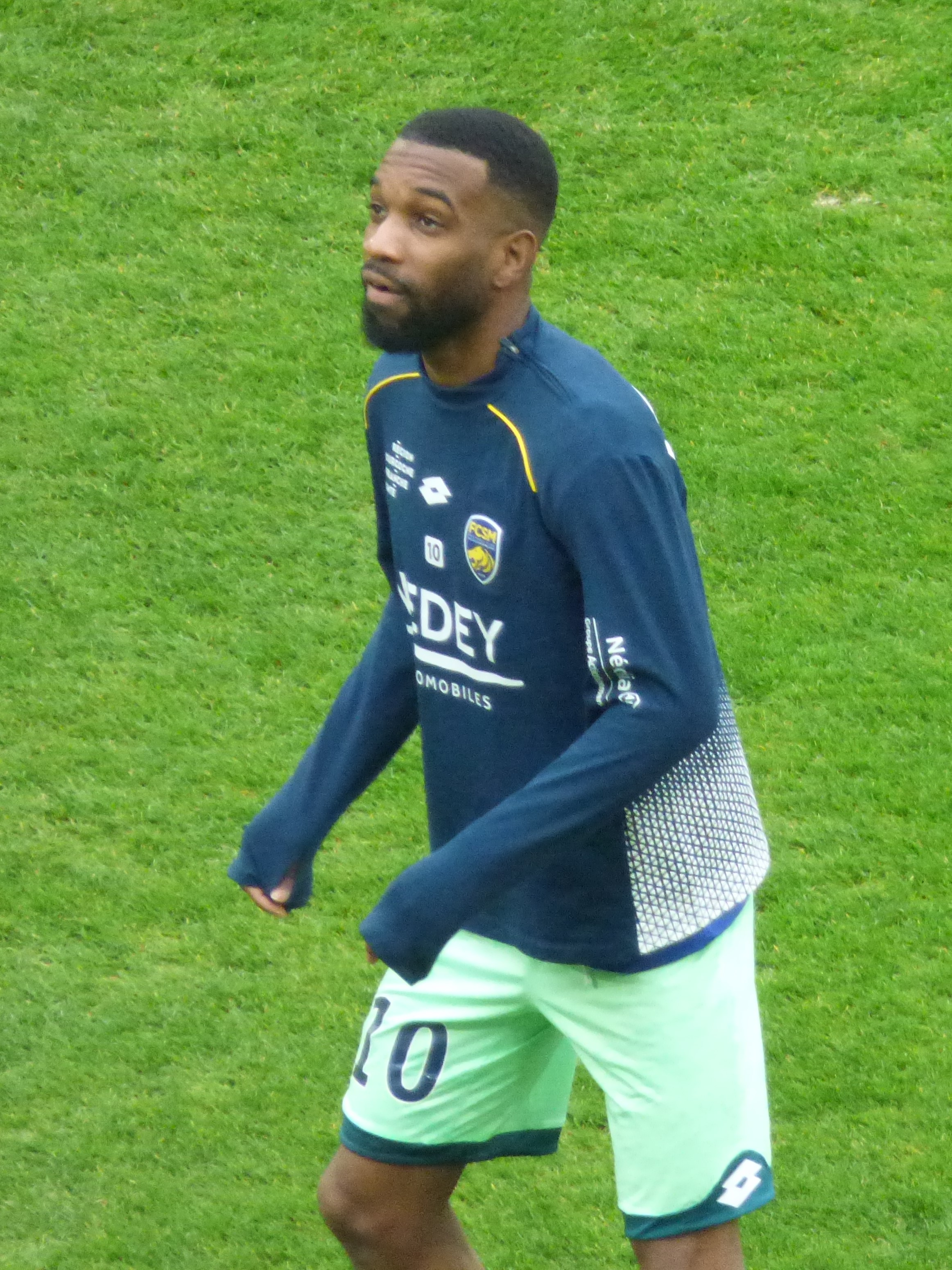
- Ourega with Sochaux in 2019

Personal information
- Date of birth: 7 December 1992 (age 33)
- Place of birth: Paris, France
- Height: 1.78 m (5 ft 10 in)
- Position: Midfielder

Team information
- Current team: Kauno Žalgiris
- Number: 70

Senior career*
Years	Team	Apps	(Gls)
2011–2013	Drancy	41	(2)
2013–2015	Le Havre II	32	(4)
2015–2016	Virton	8	(0)
2017–2018	Drancy	24	(5)
2018–2019	Paris II	5	(0)
2018–2019	Paris	27	(0)
2019–2021	Sochaux	2	(1)
2021–2022	Orléans	10	(0)
2022	Žalgiris	32	(5)
2023–2024	Astana	30	(1)
2025–	Kauno Žalgiris	55	(13)
- * Club domestic league appearances and goals as of 20 July 2026

Fabien Ourega (born 7 December 1992) is a French professional footballer who plays as a midfielder for Toplyga club Kauno Žalgiris.

== Professional career ==
Ourega began his footballing career in the lower division of France, before moving to R.E. Virton in 2015. Afterwards, he spent a year without a club. In 2018 earned a professional contract with Paris FC. Ourega made his professional debut with Paris FC in a 0–0 Ligue 2 tie with LB Châteauroux on 19 October 2018.

On 29 January 2022 Ourega signed for a Lithuanian club FK Žalgiris.

On 13 February 2023, Ourega signed for Kazakhstan Premier League club Astana. On 11 August 2024, Astana announced that they were in progress of terminating the contract of Ourega. The following day, 12 August 2024, Astana announced the departure of Ourega by mutual consent.

== Personal life ==
Born in France, Ourega is of Ivorian descent.

His younger brother Dylan Ourega is also a footballer.

== Honours ==
Kauno Žalgiris

- Toplyga: 2025, 2026
- Lithuanian Cup: 2026
- Lithuanian Supercup: 2026
