= Elkhan Astanov =

Kazakhstani footballer

Personal information
- Full name: Elkhan Astanuly Astanov
- Date of birth: 21 May 2000 (age 26)
- Place of birth: Shymkent, Kazakhstan
- Height: 1.86 m (6 ft 1 in)
- Positions: Winger; attacking midfielder

Team information
- Current team: Ordabasy
- Number: 20

Senior career*
Years	Team	Apps	(Gls)
2017–2019	Ordabasy U21	59	(19)
2019–2023	Ordabasy	65	(9)
2023–2025	Astana	47	(6)
2025–	Ordabasy	36	(15)

International career^{‡}
2020–2022	Kazakhstan U21	11	(1)
2021–	Kazakhstan	26	(1)
- * Club domestic league appearances and goals as of 13:39, 31 October 2026 (UTC) ‡ National team caps and goals as of 8 October 2026

Elkhan Astanuly Astanov (Kazakh: Елхан Астанұлы Астанов; born 21 May 2000) is a Kazakh professional footballer who plays as a winger for Kazakhstan Premier League club Ordabasy and the Kazakhstan national team.

== Club career ==
On 13 March 2023, Astana announced the signing of Astanov from Ordabasy.

== International career ==
Astanov made his international debut for Kazakhstan on 28 March 2021 in a 2022 FIFA World Cup qualification match against France, which finished as a 2–0 loss.

== Career statistics ==
=== International ===
As of match played 29 September 2026

Appearances and goals by national team and year
National team	Year	Apps	Goals
Kazakhstan
Kazakhstan	2021	1	0
Kazakhstan	2022	8	1
Kazakhstan	2023	2	0
Kazakhstan	2024	7	0
Kazakhstan	2025	4	0
Kazakhstan	2026	4	0
Total		26	1

Scores and results list Kazakhstan's goal tally first, score column indicates score after each Astanov goal.

List of international goals scored by Elkhan Astanov
No.	Date	Venue	Opponent	Score	Result	Competition
1	13 June 2022	Astana Arena, Nur-Sultan, Kazakhstan	Slovakia	2–0	2–1	2022–23 UEFA Nations League C

== Honours ==
Ordabasy

- Kazakhstan Premier League: 2026
- Kazakhstan Cup: 2026
