= Dembo Darboe =

Gambian footballer (born 1998)

Personal information
- Date of birth: 17 August 1998 (age 28)
- Place of birth: Brikama, The Gambia
- Height: 1.86 m (6 ft 1 in)
- Position: Forward

Senior career*
Years	Team	Apps	(Gls)
2015–2017	Real de Banjul		
2017–2019	ASEC Ndiambour		
2019–2020	Shkupi	41	(18)
2021–2022	Shakhtyor Soligorsk	40	(24)
2022–2024	Al-Nasr	12	(3)
2023	→ Astana (loan)	21	(5)
2024	→ Ordabasy (loan)	8	(3)
2024–2025	Neftçi Baku	16	(5)
2025	Al Ahli Tripoli	0	(0)

International career^{‡}
2021–	Gambia	5	(0)
- * Club domestic league appearances and goals as of 22 March 2026 ‡ National team caps and goals as of 20 July 2022

Dembo Darboe (born 17 August 1998) is a Gambian professional footballer who plays as a forward.

== Club career ==
=== Early years ===
Darboe started his professional football career at the age of 17 with Real de Banjul, where he only played for one season. In the summer of 2017, he made his first move to Senegalese club ASEC Ndiambour, where he spent two seasons.

In 2019, Darboe moved to Europe where he signed for Macedonian club Shkupi. In his second season at the club, he experienced his breakthrough by scoring 17 goals in 19 league appearances.

=== Shakhtyor Soligorsk ===
In January 2021, Darboe signed with defending Belarusian champions, Shakhtyor Soligorsk, for an undisclosed fee believed to be €700,000. He made his debut for the club in the starting lineup of the Belarusian Super Cup win over BATE Borisov on 2 March 2021.

=== Al-Nasr ===
In August 2022, Darboe joined UAE Pro League club Al-Nasr.

Darboe joined Kazakhstan Premier League club Astana on a one-year loan deal on 25 January 2023.

On 22 March 2024, Darboe returned to the Kazakhstan Premier League, joining Champions Ordabasy on a one-year loan deal.

=== Neftçi ===
Darboe signed a two-year contract with Azerbaijan Premier League club Neftçi PFK on August 28, 2024. On 16 June 2025, Neftçi announced that Darboe had left the club.

=== Al Ahli Tripoli ===
On 7 September 2025, Libyan Premier League club Al Ahli Tripoli announced the signing of Darboe to a two-year contract.

== International career ==
Darboe debuted for the Gambia in a 2–0 friendly win over Niger on 6 June 2021.

He played in the 2021 Africa Cup of Nations, his national team's first continental tournament, where they made a sensational quarter-final.

== Honours ==
Shakhtyor Soligorsk

- Belarusian Premier League: 2021
- Belarusian Super Cup: 2021
