= 2022 Kazakhstan Premier League =

Kazakhstan Premier League
- Season: 2022
- Dates: 5 March – 6 November 2022
- Champions: Astana
- Relegated: Taraz; Turan; Akzhayik
- Champions League: Astana
- Europa Conference League: Aktobe; Ordabasy; Tobol
- Matches: 182
- Goals: 478 (2.63 per match)
- Top goalscorer: Pedro Eugénio (18)
- Biggest home win: Astana 6–0 Kairat
- Biggest away win: Kairat 0–4 Astana
- Highest scoring: Shakhter Karagandy 5–1 Maktaaral; Astana 6–0 Kairat; Tobol 4–2 Maktaaral; Shakhter Karagandy 4–2 Aksu; Astana 5–1 Atyrau
- Longest winning run: Aktobe (8)
- Longest unbeaten run: Aktobe; Atyrau (8)
- Longest winless run: Atyrau; Kyzylzhar; Taraz (7)
- Longest losing run: Aksu (5)
- Highest attendance: 15000 - Ordabasy vs Aktobe (29 October 2022)
- Lowest attendance: 100 - Atyrau vs Aksu (5 March 2022)
- Total attendance: 624,057
- Average attendance: 3,429 (06 November 2022)
- All statistics correct as of 06 November 2022.

The 2022 Kazakhstan Premier League was the 31st season of the Kazakhstan Premier League, the highest football league competition in Kazakhstan. FC Tobol were the defending champions after winning their second title the previous season.

== Events ==
On 11 March, Shakhter Karagandy were awarded a 3-0 technical victory over Astana after Astana fielded seven foreign players on the pitch at the same time during their match on 5 March 2022.

== Teams ==
FC Kaisar (relegated after five years in the top flight) and Zhetysu (relegated after four years in the top flight) were relegated at the end of the 2021 season. They were replaced by Aksu and Maktaaral from the Kazakhstan First League (both promoted to the top division for the first time in their history).

=== Team overview ===
Locations of teams in the 2022 Kazakhstan Premier League

Team	Location	Venue	Capacity
Aksu	Pavlodar	Central Stadium	11,828
Aktobe	Aktobe	Central Stadium	12,729
Akzhayik	Oral	Petr Atoyan Stadium	8,320
Astana	Astana	Astana Arena	30,200
Atyrau	Atyrau	Munaishy Stadium	8,900
Caspiy	Aktau	Zhastar Stadium	5,000
Kairat	Almaty	Central Stadium	23,804
Kyzylzhar	Petropavl	Karasai Stadium	11,000
Maktaaral	Zhetisay	Erlan Zeykenov Stadium	3,000
Ordabasy	Shymkent	Kazhymukan Munaitpasov Stadium	20,000
Shakhter	Karaganda	Shakhter Stadium	19,500
Taraz	Taraz	Central Stadium	12,527
Tobol	Kostanay	Central Stadium	9,500
Turan	Turkistan	Turkistan Arena	7,000

=== Personnel and kits ===
Note: Flags indicate national team as has been defined under FIFA eligibility rules. Players and Managers may hold more than one non-FIFA nationality.

Team	Manager	Captain	Kit manufacturer	Shirt sponsor
Aksu	(Ukraine) Ruslan Kostyshyn	(Kazakhstan) Gafurzhan Suyumbayev	Adidas	Parimatch
Aktobe	(Kazakhstan) Andrei Karpovich	(Lithuania) Artūras Žulpa	Adidas	Parimatch
Akzhayik	(Moldova) Oleg Bejenar	(Russia) Sergey Shustikov	Adidas	-
Astana	(Kazakhstan) Grigori Babayan	(Kazakhstan) Abzal Beisebekov	Adidas	
Atyrau	(Belarus) Vitaly Zhukovsky	(Armenia) Aram Ayrapetyan	Puma	GAZ Stroy Montazh KZ
Caspiy	(Bulgaria) Nikolay Kostov	(Kazakhstan) Nurlybek Ayazbaev	Adidas	
Kairat	(Kazakhstan) Kirill Keker	(Cameroon) Macky Bagnack	Nike	
Kyzylzhar	(Kazakhstan) Ali Aliyev	(Russia) Miroslav Lobantsev	Nike	
Maktaaral	(Kazakhstan) Konstantin Gorovenko	(Belarus) Ruslan Yudenkov	Nike	
Ordabasy	(Belarus) Aleksandr Sednyov	(Kazakhstan) Bekkhan Shayzada	Adidas	
Shakhter	(Kazakhstan) Vakhid Masudov	(Kazakhstan) Igor Shatsky	Adidas	Triangle Tyres
Taraz	(Kazakhstan) Nurken Mazbaev	(Kazakhstan) Maksat Amirkhanov	Nike	
Tobol	(Serbia) Milan Milanović	(Kazakhstan) Askhat Tagybergen	Adidas	Polymetal
Turan	(Kazakhstan) Aleksandr Kuchma	(Kazakhstan) Azat Nurgaliyev	Adidas	

=== Foreign players ===
The number of foreign players is restricted to eight per KPL team. A team can use only five foreign players on the field in each game. From the 2020 season, the KFF announced that players from countries of the Eurasian Economic Union would not be counted towards a club's foreign player limit.

For transfers during the season, see Winter 2021–22 transfers and Summer 2022 transfers.

Club	Player 1	Player 2	Player 3	Player 4	Player 5	Player 6	Player 7	Player 8	Player 9	EAEU Players	Former Players
Aksu	(Guinea-Bissau) **Toni Silva**	(Nigeria) Faith Obilor	(Serbia) Lazar Zličić	(Ukraine) Oleksiy Dytyatyev	(Ukraine) Yevhen Kucherenko					(Kyrgyzstan) **Kayrat Zhyrgalbek uulu** (Russia) Mikhail Bakayev (Russia) Islam Zhilov	(Liberia) **Sam Johnson** (Russia) Ali Gadzhibekov (South Africa) **May Mahlangu** (Ukraine) Yevhen Zadoya
Aktobe	(Brazil) China	(France) Hugo Vidémont	(Liberia) **Joachim Adukor**	(Lithuania) **Artūras Žulpa**	(Ghana) Ernest Antwi	(Rwanda) **Gerard Gohou**	(Serbia) Saša Stamenković	(Ukraine) Vitaliy Balashov	(Croatia) Mate Crnčević	(Russia) **Ruslan Kambolov** (Russia) Serder Serderov (Moldova) Vladimir Ghinaitis	(Russia) Nikita Malyarov
Akzhayik	(Brazil) Rafael Sabino	(Georgia (country)) Luka Imnadze	(Georgia (country)) Toma Tabatadze	(Moldova) Ștefan Sicaci	(Ukraine) Maksym Kalenchuk	(Ukraine) Illya Kovalenko	(Ukraine) Kostyantyn Makhnovskyi	(Ukraine) Vitaliy Pryndeta	(Ukraine) Rodion Syamuk	(Armenia) **Zaven Badoyan** (Belarus) Pavel Nazarenko (Russia) Artur Gazdanov (Russia) Sergey Shustikov (Russia) Aleksandr Vulfov (Armenia) **Petros Avetisyan**	(Croatia) Mate Crnčević (Montenegro) **Šaleta Kordić** (Serbia) Djordje Ivkovic (Serbia) Miloš Stamenković (Ukraine) Ihor Karpenko
Astana	(Brazil) Bryan Garcia	(Croatia) **Marin Tomasov**	(France) Keelan Lebon	(France) Jérémy Manzorro	(Portugal) Pedro Eugénio	(Serbia) Marko Milošević	(Ukraine) Danylo Beskorovaynyi			(Armenia) **Kamo Hovhannisyan** (Belarus) **Max Ebong** (Belarus) **Denis Polyakov** (Belarus) **Artsyom Rakhmanaw**	(Liberia) Mohammed Kamara (Netherlands) Rai Vloet
Atyrau	(Bosnia and Herzegovina) Todor Petrović	(Brazil) Matheus Bissi	(Croatia) Andrija Filipović	(Lithuania) Domantas Antanavičius	(Poland) Paweł Baranowski	(Poland) Piotr Grzelczak	(Tajikistan) Khusrav Toirov			(Armenia) **Aram Ayrapetyan** (Russia) Pavel Dolgov (Russia) Denis Mitrofanov (Russia) Dmitry Pletnyov (Russia) Soslan Takulov (Russia) Nikolai Tarasov (Russia) Yuri Zavezyon	(Brazil) Allef (Russia) Anatoli Katrich
Caspiy	(Brazil) Ruan Teles	(Croatia) Ivan Pešić	(France) Chafik Tigroudja	(Georgia (country)) Rati Ardazishvili	(Portugal) Rúben Brígido	(Serbia) Nikola Cuckić	(Ukraine) Artem Baranovskyi	(Ukraine) Taras Bondarenko		(Russia) Pavel Kireyenko (Russia) Aleksei Kozlov	(North Macedonia) Risto Jankov
Kairat	(Brazil) João Paulo	(Cameroon) **Macky Bagnack**								(Kyrgyzstan) **Gulzhigit Alykulov** (Russia) Anton Krachkovsky (Russia) Vadim Ulyanov (Russia) **Viktor Vasin**	(Cameroon) David Ekwe (Guinea) **José Kanté** (Poland) **Jacek Góralski** (Portugal) Ricardo Alves (Uzbekistan) **Jasurbek Jaloliddinov**
Kyzylzhar	(Argentina) Pablo Podio	(Brazil) Gian	(Croatia) Mateo Mužek	(Ivory Coast) **Moussa Koné**	(Georgia (country)) **Elguja Lobjanidze**	(Montenegro) **Darko Zorić**	(Ukraine) Yuriy Bushman			(Belarus) Valery Karshakevich (Belarus) Sergey Tikhonovsky (Russia) Maksim Chikanchi (Russia) Yevgeni Kozlov (Russia) Miroslav Lobantsev (Russia) Oleg Murachyov (Russia) Pavel Yakovlev	(Belarus) **Kiryl Sidarenka** (Brazil) Lucas Cardoso (Democratic Republic of the Congo) **Jordan Nkololo** (Georgia (country)) Giorgi Ivaniadze (Russia) Aleksandr Dovbnya (Russia) Andrei Panyukov (Serbia) Stefan Živković (Ukraine) Artur Murza
Maktaaral	(Brazil) Alex Bruno	(France) Billal Sebaihi	(Ivory Coast) Yao Léonard Djaha	(Ivory Coast) Sékou Doumbia	(Ivory Coast) Dramane Koné	(Moldova) **Artiom Rozgoniuc**	(Ukraine) Serhiy Litovchenko	(Ukraine) Artur Zapadnya		(Belarus) Pavel Chikida (Belarus) Aleksey Nosko (Belarus) **Ruslan Yudenkov** (Kyrgyzstan) **Odilzhon Abdurakhmanov** (Russia) Yegor Potapov	(Tajikistan) **Sheriddin Boboyev** (Russia) Rasambek Akhmatov
Ordabasy	(Brazil) Victor Braga	(Brazil) Luiz Guedes	(Serbia) Dominik Dinga	(Togo) **Serge Nyuiadzi**	(Ukraine) Oleksandr Batyshchev	(Uzbekistan) Odil Abdumajidov	(Uzbekistan) **Shokhboz Umarov**			(Belarus) Dzmitry Baradzin (Belarus) Vsevolod Sadovsky (Russia) Igor Klyushkin (Russia) Nikita Shershnyov	(Ivory Coast) Sékou Doumbia (Ukraine) Yevhen Chahovets
Shakhter	(Bosnia and Herzegovina) Đorđe Ćosić	(Colombia) Roger Cañas	(Croatia) Ivan Graf	(Georgia (country)) Temur Chogadze	(Kyrgyzstan) **Farkhat Musabekov**	(Serbia) Stefan Bukorac	(Ukraine) Mykola Kovtalyuk			(Belarus) **Aleksandr Poznyak** (Russia) Yevgeni Kobzar (Russia) Temur Mustafin	(Armenia) **Petros Avetisyan** (Belarus) Pavel Nazarenko (Bosnia and Herzegovina) Edin Rustemović (Cameroon) Abdel Lamanje (Russia) Amir Aduyev (Russia) Vladimir Khozin (Russia) Kirill Malyarov
Taraz	(Bulgaria) Milen Gamakov	(Georgia (country)) Luka Gadrani	(Haiti) **Alex Junior**	(Ukraine) Maksym Dehtyarov						(Russia) Denis Kavlinov	(Brazil) Jorge Elias
Tobol	(Ivory Coast) Serges Déblé	(North Macedonia) Aleksa Amanović	(Montenegro) **Žarko Tomašević**	(Nigeria) Chidi Osuchukwu	(Serbia) Dušan Jovančić	(Serbia) **Zoran Tošić**	(Serbia) **Miljan Vukadinović**	(Uzbekistan) **Igor Sergeyev**		(Russia) Timur Akmurzin	(Portugal) Rúben Brígido (Slovenia) **Rudi Požeg Vancaš**
Turan	(North Macedonia) **Samir Fazli**	(Montenegro) Zvonko Ceklic	(Sierra Leone) Raphael Koroma	(Senegal) Abdoulaye Diakate						(Belarus) Artyom Gurenko (Belarus) **Oleg Yevdokimov** (Belarus) Andrey Zaleski (Kyrgyzstan) **Erzhan Tokotayev**	(Azerbaijan) **Emil Balayev** (Guinea-Bissau) **Toni Silva** (Ivory Coast) Cédric Gogoua (Kyrgyzstan) **Farkhat Musabekov** (Nigeria) Chidi Osuchukwu (Russia) Aleksandr Kleshchenko

In bold: Players that have been capped for their national team.

=== Managerial changes ===
Team	Outgoing manager	Manner of departure	Date of vacancy	Position in table	Incoming manager	Date of appointment
Aksu				Pre-Season	Ruslan Kostyshyn	19 January 2022
Astana	Vladimir Yezhurov (Caretaker)	End of role	21 November 2021	Pre-Season	Srdjan Blagojevic	21 November 2021
Atyrau	Aram Voskanyan			Pre-Season	Konstantin Gorovenka	14 December 2021
Caspiy	Srdjan Blagojevic	Signed by Astana	21 November 2021	Pre-Season	Nikolay Kostov	31 December 2021
Maktaaral	Konstantin Gorovenko	Resigned		Pre-Season	Andrey Ferapontov	14 January 2022
Taraz	Vardan Minasyan			Pre-Season	Nurken Mazbaev	13 January 2022
Turan	Abdukhalik Buribayev			Pre-Season	Vladimir Gazzayev	14 January 2022
Turan	Vladimir Gazzayev	Resigned	6 April 2022	11th	Kuanysh Kabdulov (Interim)	6 April 2022
Aktobe	Vladimir Mukhanov	Resigned	28 April 2022	8th	Petr Badlo (Acting)	28 April 2022
Kyzylzhar	Andrei Karpovich	Resigned	29 April 2022	13th	Ali Aliyev	29 April 2022
Shakhter Karagandy	Magomed Adiyev	Appointed Kazakhstan Manager	5 May 2022	7th	Konstantin Emeljanov (Acting)	5 May 2022
Aktobe	Petr Badlo (Acting)	End of role	6 May 2022	6th	Andrei Karpovich	6 May 2022
Tobol	Alexander Moskalenko (Caretaker)	Mutual agreement	16 May 2022	7th	Milan Milanović	20 May 2022
Kairat	Kurban Berdyev	Mutual agreement	6 June 2022	8th	Kirill Keker	8 June 2022
Turan	Kuanysh Kabdulov (Interim)	End of role	11 June 2022		Sergey Kogay (Interim)	12 June 2022
Shakhter Karagandy	Konstantin Emeljanov (Acting)	End of role	28 June 2022	9th	Vakhid Masudov	28 June 2022
Akzhayik	Volodymyr Mazyar		12 July 2022	13th	Igor Picușceac	14 July 2022
Atyrau	Konstantin Gorovenko	Resigned	19 August 2022	8th	Vyacheslav Bogatyrev (Caretaker)	19 August 2022
Akzhayik	Igor Picușceac	Moved to Assistant Manager	20 August 2022	13th	Oleg Bejenar	21 August 2022
Atyrau	Vyacheslav Bogatyrev (Caretaker)	End of role	21 August 2021	8th	Vitaly Zhukovsky	22 August 2022
Turan	Sergey Kogay (Interim)	End of role	1 September 2022		Aleksandr Kuchma	1 September 2022
Maktaaral	Andrey Ferapontov		7 September 2022		Konstantin Gorovenko	8 September 2022
Astana	Srdjan Blagojevic	Signed by Debrecen	13 September 2022	2nd	Grigori Babayan	13 September 2022

== Regular season ==
=== League table ===
Pos	Team	Pld	W	D	L	GF	GA	GD	Pts	Qualification or relegation
1	Astana (C)	26	16	5	5	65	24	+41	53	Qualification for the Champions League first qualifying round
2	Aktobe	26	16	4	6	43	28	+15	52	Qualification for the Europa Conference League second qualifying round
3	Tobol	26	14	5	7	46	33	+13	47	Qualification for the Europa Conference League first qualifying round
4	Kairat	26	12	6	8	34	36	−2	42	
5	Ordabasy (Note: Qualified as cup winners)	26	11	5	10	36	39	−3	38	Qualification for the Europa Conference League second qualifying round
6	Aksu	26	11	3	12	32	37	−5	36	
7	Shakhter Karagandy	26	9	5	12	34	35	−1	32	
8	Maktaaral	26	8	7	11	28	38	−10	31	
9	Caspiy	26	9	4	13	26	42	−16	31	
10	Kyzylzhar	26	7	9	10	33	32	+1	30	
11	Atyrau	26	7	8	11	30	39	−9	29	
12	Taraz (R)	26	6	10	10	27	29	−2	28	Relegation to the Kazakhstan First Division
13	Turan (R)	26	6	10	10	25	35	−10	28	Relegation to the Kazakhstan First Division
14	Akzhayik (R)	26	6	7	13	19	31	−12	25	Relegation to the Kazakhstan First Division

Source: UEFA, Soccerway
Rules for classification: 1) Points; 2) Goal difference; 3) Matches won; 4) Goals scored; 5) Away goals scored; 6) Head-to-head points; 7) Head-to-head matches won; 8) Head-to-head goal difference; 9) Head-to-head goals scored; 10) Head-to-head away goals scored; 11) Draw.
(C) Champions; (R) Relegated

=== Results ===
==== Results table ====
Home \ Away	AKS	AKT	AKZ	AST	ATY	CAS	KRT	KYZ	MAK	ORD	SHA	TAR	TOB	TUR
Aksu		1–2	1–0	1–0	2–1	2–0	1–2	1–0	4–2	2–2	1–1	1–2	3–0	2–0
Aktobe	1–0		2–1	4–1	2–1	4–0	4–1	1–0	1–0	3–1	1–1	1–0	2–1	3–2
Akzhayik	0–1	3–1		1–0	4–2	2–0	0–0	2–2	0–0	0–1	1–2	0–0	1–3	1–1
Astana	5–0	1–0	4–0		5–1	4–0	6–0	1–0	4–0	6–0	0–3	2–1	1–2	3–3
Atyrau	0–0	0–2	0–1	1–1		3–2	1–2	3–3	2–1	2–1	2–2	0–0	2–1	0–2
Caspiy	1–0	2–0	0–0	0–3	2–1		2–2	1–0	2–4	2–1	4–0	2–1	0–0	0–2
Kairat	2–0	2–0	2–0	0–4	0–3	1–0		1–1	1–0	1–2	2–0	1–1	2–3	0–1
Kyzylzhar	2–1	1–1	2–0	0–2	3–1	4–1	1–2		1–1	4–0	0–1	1–1	1–3	3–1
Maktaaral	2–1	1–1	1–0	0–3	1–1	2–1	0–1	1–1		0–0	0–2	0–1	2–1	2–0
Ordabasy	3–0	2–2	2–0	1–2	2–0	4–1	2–1	3–1	1–1		1–0	3–2	3–1	1–2
Shakhter K	4–2	2–3	0–1	2–3	0–0	0–1	0–2	1–2	5–1	1–0		1–0	4–1	0–0
Taraz	3–4	3–0	2–0	1–1	0–1	1–1	1–1	0–0	0–1	1–0	2–1		0–2	2–3
Tobol	2–0	1–0	1–0	1–1	0–2	1–0	2–2	2–0	4–2	4–0	3–1	2–2		3–0
Turan	0–1	0–2	1–1	3–1	0–0	0–1	1–3	0–0	0–3	0–0	2–0	0–0	2–2	

Source: Soccerway
Legend: Blue = home team win; Yellow = draw; Red = away team win.

==== Results by match played ====
Team ╲ Round	1	2	3	4	5	6	7	8	9	10	11	12	13	14	15	16	17	18	19	20	21	22	23	24	25	26
Aksu	D	W	L	L	L	L	L	W	W	L	W	L	L	L	D	W	L	W	W	W	L	W	W	D	L	W
Aktobe	L	W	L	D	W	D	W	L	W	L	W	W	W	W	W	W	W	W	D	W	L	W	L	W	D	W
Akzhayik	L	D	L	D	W	W	W	L	L	D	L	L	W	D	L	L	W	L	L	L	W	L	D	D	D	L
Astana	L	L	W	W	W	L	W	D	D	W	W	D	W	W	L	W	D	W	W	L	D	W	W	W	W	W
Atyrau	D	L	W	W	L	L	W	D	W	W	D	D	D	L	D	D	L	W	W	L	L	L	L	L	D	L
Caspiy	W	D	W	W	L	W	L	W	L	W	L	W	L	L	L	L	D	L	L	W	W	L	L	D	D	L
Kairat	W	W	D	D	W	D	L	L	D	L	L	W	W	W	D	W	D	L	W	L	W	W	L	W	W	L
Kyzylzhar	L	L	L	W	D	D	L	D	D	D	D	W	L	W	L	L	W	L	W	D	L	D	W	D	L	W
Maktaaral	D	L	L	L	L	W	L	D	L	D	W	L	W	L	D	L	L	L	D	D	W	W	W	W	W	D
Ordabasy	D	L	W	L	W	D	W	W	L	L	L	W	L	W	W	W	L	L	L	W	W	L	W	D	D	D
Shakhter Karagandy	W	W	W	D	W	L	L	L	W	L	W	L	D	L	D	L	W	W	W	L	L	D	L	L	D	L
Taraz	D	W	D	L	L	W	W	W	W	D	W	L	D	L	D	D	D	L	L	L	L	D	D	D	L	L
Tobol	W	D	W	W	L	D	L	D	L	W	L	W	D	W	W	D	W	W	L	W	W	L	W	L	W	W
Turan	D	D	L	L	D	D	W	D	D	W	L	L	L	D	W	D	L	W	L	W	D	D	L	L	L	W

Updated to match(es) played on 6 November 2022. Source:
W = Win; D = Draw; L = Loss; P = Postponed

=== Positions by round ===
Team ╲ Round	1	2	3	4	5	6	7	8	9	10	11	12	13	14	15	16	17	18	19	20	21	22	23	24	25	26
Astana	14	14	10	6	5	5	3	5	4	3	2	2	1	1	2	2	2	2	2	2	2	2	2	2	1	1
Aktobe	13	7	9	10	8	8	8	9	7	8	6	4	2	2	1	1	1	1	1	1	1	1	1	1	2	2
Tobol	3	3	3	2	3	4	6	6	9	6	7	7	7	4	3	4	3	3	3	3	3	3	3	3	3	3
Kairat	2	2	2	4	2	3	4	7	8	9	10	9	8	6	6	5	4	5	5	5	4	4	4	4	4	4
Ordabasy	5	10	6	8	6	6	5	2	5	7	8	8	9	7	4	3	5	6	7	6	5	5	5	5	5	5
Aksu	9	6	8	9	11	12	13	12	10	12	9	10	11	12	13	10	12	10	9	8	9	7	6	6	6	6
Shakhter Karagandy	1	1	1	1	1	1	1	4	2	5	3	5	5	8	8	9	7	4	4	4	6	6	7	7	7	7
Maktaaral	6	11	12	14	14	13	14	14	14	14	14	14	14	14	14	14	14	14	14	14	14	14	13	12	9	8
Caspiy	4	5	4	3	4	2	2	1	3	1	4	1	4	5	7	8	8	9	10	9	7	8	8	8	8	9
Kyzylzhar	11	13	14	11	12	11	12	13	13	13	13	11	12	10	11	12	10	12	11	11	12	12	11	11	12	10
Atyrau	7	9	7	5	7	9	9	8	6	4	5	6	6	9	9	7	9	8	6	7	8	9	9	10	10	11
Taraz	8	4	5	7	9	7	7	3	1	2	1	3	3	3	5	6	6	7	8	10	10	10	10	9	11	12
Turan	10	8	11	13	13	14	11	11	12	10	11	12	14	13	12	11	13	11	12	12	11	11	12	13	14	13
Akzhayik	12	12	13	12	10	10	10	10	11	11	12	13	10	11	10	13	11	13	13	13	13	13	14	14	13	14

Leader
Europa Conference League second qualifying round
Relegation to 2023 Kazakhstan First Division

Updated to match(es) played on 6 November 2022. Source:

== Statistics ==
=== Top scorers ===
As of matches played on 6 November 2022

Rank	Player	Club	Goals
1	(Portugal) Pedro Eugénio	Astana	18
2	(Croatia) Marin Tomasov	Astana	15
3	(Croatia) Andrija Filipović	Atyrau	13
4	(Brazil) João Paulo	Kairat	11
5	(Kazakhstan) Timur Dosmagambetov	Shakhter Karagandy/Astana	9
5	(Kazakhstan) Abat Aymbetov	Astana	9
5	(Uzbekistan) Igor Sergeyev	Tobol	9
8	(France) Hugo Vidémont	Aktobe	8
8	(Kazakhstan) Yerkebulan Tungyshbayev	Aksu	8
8	(Kazakhstan) Artur Shushenachev	Kairat	8
8	(Rwanda) Gerard Gohou	Aktobe	8
8	(Kazakhstan) Askhat Tagybergen	Tobol	8
8	(Kazakhstan) Abylayhan Zhumabek	Taraz	8

=== Hat-tricks ===
Player	For	Against	Result	Date	Ref.
(Ukraine) Yuriy Bushman	Kyzylzhar	Atyrau	3–3 (A)	14 May 2022	
(Croatia) Marin Tomasov	Astana	Kairat	6–0 (H)	14 May 2022	
(Croatia) Marin Tomasov	Astana	Maktaaral	4–0 (H)	3 July 2022	
(Kazakhstan) Yerkebulan Tungyshbayev	Aksu	Maktaaral	4–2 (H)	4 September 2022	
(Brazil) João Paulo	Kairat	Turan	1–3 (A)	11 September 2022	
(Kazakhstan) Abat Aymbetov	Astana	Ordabasy	6–0 (H)	9 October 2022	
(Kazakhstan) Timur Dosmagambetov	Astana	Kairat	4–0 (A)	15 October 2022	
(Portugal) Pedro Eugénio	Astana	Atyrau	5–1 (H)	23 October 2022	
(Georgia (country)) Elguja Lobjanidze	Kyzylzhar	Caspiy	4–1 (H)	6 November 2022	

=== Clean sheets ===
As of matches played 6 November 2022

Rank	Player	Club	Clean sheets
1	(Kyrgyzstan) Erzhan Tokotayev	Turan	8
1	(Kazakhstan) Danil Ustimenko	Kairat	8
3	(Kazakhstan) Stas Pokatilov	Aktobe	7
3	(Armenia) Aram Ayrapetyan	Atyrau	7
3	(Kazakhstan) Nurlybek Ayazbaev	Caspiy	7
6	(Serbia) Marko Milošević	Astana	6
6	(Kazakhstan) Aleksandr Mokin	Tobol	6
6	(Ukraine) Yevhen Kucherenko	Aksu	6
6	(Kazakhstan) Aleksandr Zarutskiy	Astana	6
10	(Moldova) Ștefan Sicaci	Akzhayik	5
10	(Kazakhstan) Mukhammedzhan Seysen	Taraz	5
10	(Kazakhstan) Igor Shatsky	Shakhter Karagandy	5
10	(Ukraine) Serhiy Litovchenko	Maktaaral	5

Aleksandr Mokin & Timur Akmurzin both played in Tobol's 4-0 victory over Ordabasy on 27 August 2022

== Awards ==
=== Monthly awards ===
Month	Manager of the Month		Player of the Month		Goal of the Month		References
Month	Manager	Club	Player	Club	Player	Club	References
March	(Bulgaria) Nikolay Kostov	Caspiy	(Guinea) José Kanté	Kairat	(France) Hugo Vidémont	Aktobe	
April	(Belarus) Aleksandr Sednyov	Ordabasy	(Kazakhstan) Bauyrzhan Baytana	Taraz	(Rwanda) Gerard Gohou	Aktobe	
May	(Kazakhstan) Konstantin Gorovenko	Atyrau	(Croatia) Andrija Filipović	Atyrau	(Kazakhstan) Ular Zhaksybaev	Aksu	
June	(Kazakhstan) Andrei Karpovich	Aktobe	(Kazakhstan) Elkhan Astanov	Ordabasy	(France) Hugo Vidémont	Aktobe	
July							

== Attendances ==
#	Club	Average
1	Aktobe	9,354
2	Ordabasy	6,154
3	Kairat	5,208
4	Taraz	4,662
5	Astana	3,285
6	Aqsu	3,073
7	Atyrau	2,896
8	Tobol	2,315
9	Shakhter	2,246
10	Caspiy	2,173
11	Turan	2,008
12	Qyzyljar	1,804
13	Akzhaiyk	1,450
14	Maqtaaral	1,108
