= List of Kazakhstan football transfers winter 2021–22 =

Winter transfer Window

This is a list of Kazakh football transfers during the 2021 winter transfer window, which runs from 10 January until 24 April 2022. Only clubs of the 2022 Kazakhstan Premier League are included.

== Kazakhstan Premier League 2022 ==
=== Aksu ===
In: Note: Flags indicate national team as defined under FIFA eligibility rules; some limited exceptions apply. Players may hold more than one non-FIFA nationality.

No.	Pos.	Nation	Player
1	GK	KAZ	Marsel Islamkulov (from (Kazakhstan) Kaisar)
3	DF	RUS	Islam Zhilov (from (Russia) Mashuk-KMV Pyatigorsk)
5	DF	KAZ	Gafurzhan Suyumbayev (from (Kazakhstan) Kairat)
6	DF	RUS	Ali Gadzhibekov (from (Russia) Legion Dynamo Makhachkala)
7	MF	KAZ	Aslanbek Kakimov (from (Kazakhstan) Ekibastuz)
8	DF	KAZ	Ular Zhaksybaev (from (Kazakhstan) Kyran)
10	MF	KAZ	Rafail Ospanov (from (Kazakhstan) Atyrau)
11	FW	KAZ	Damir Marat (from (Kazakhstan) Ekibastuz)
18	FW	KAZ	Arman Smailov (from (Kazakhstan) Ekibastuz)
21	MF	KAZ	Yerkebulan Tungyshbayev (from (Kazakhstan) Ordabasy)
23	MF	KAZ	Dmitry Bachek (from (Spain) Antequera)
27	DF	KAZ	Pavel Barkunov (from (Kazakhstan) Ekibastuz)
31	GK	KAZ	Mikhail Golubnichy (from (Kazakhstan) Zhetysu)
40	DF	KGZ	Kayrat Zhyrgalbek uulu (from (Kyrgyzstan) Dordoi Bishkek)
71	GK	UKR	Yevhen Kucherenko (on loan from (Ukraine) Kolos Kovalivka)
75	DF	NGA	Faith Obilor (from (Kazakhstan) Taraz)
87	MF	KAZ	Zhaslan Kairkenov (loan from (Kazakhstan) Astana)
88	MF	RUS	Mikhail Bakayev (from (Kazakhstan) Shakhter Karagandy)
91	FW	KAZ	Sergey Khizhnichenko (from (Kazakhstan) Ordabasy)
96	MF	KAZ	Aybol Abiken (on loan from (Kazakhstan) Kairat)
—	FW	LBR	Sam Johnson (from (Sweden) Mjällby)

Out: Note: Flags indicate national team as defined under FIFA eligibility rules; some limited exceptions apply. Players may hold more than one non-FIFA nationality.

No.	Pos.	Nation	Player
—	GK	KAZ	Anuar Sapargaliev
—	DF	KAZ	Vladislav Chernyshov
—	DF	KAZ	Valeriy Lenkov
—	DF	KAZ	Dauren Mazhitov
—	DF	KAZ	Timur Zhakupov
—	MF	KAZ	Askar Azhikenov
—	MF	KAZ	Birzhan Khabit
—	MF	KAZ	Dinmukhammed Marua
—	MF	KAZ	Pavel Shabalin
—	MF	KAZ	Demiyat Slambekov
—	MF	KAZ	Nursultan Taszhanov
—	MF	KAZ	Vadim Yakovlev
—	MF	KAZ	Daulet Zaynetdinov
—	MF	KAZ	Konstantin Zarechnyi (Retired)
—	FW	KAZ	Tamerlan Agimanov

=== Aktobe ===
In: Note: Flags indicate national team as defined under FIFA eligibility rules; some limited exceptions apply. Players may hold more than one non-FIFA nationality.

No.	Pos.	Nation	Player
1	GK	KAZ	Stas Pokatilov (from (Kazakhstan) Kairat)
6	DF	KAZ	Alibek Kasym (from (Kazakhstan) Kyzylzhar)
9	FW	BRA	China (loan from (Ukraine) Lviv)
11	MF	FRA	Hugo Vidémont (from (Lithuania) Žalgiris)
14	MF	CRO	Mate Crnčević (from (Croatia) Dinamo Zagreb II)
16	DF	KAZ	Yeskendir Kybyrai (from (Kazakhstan) Shakhter Karagandy)
19	MF	KAZ	Arman Kenesov (from (Russia) SKA-Khabarovsk)
20	GK	SRB	Saša Stamenković (from (Azerbaijan) Sabah)
22	DF	MDA	Vladimir Ghinaitis (from (Moldova) Florești)
28	FW	RUS	Serder Serderov (on loan from (Croatia) Istra 1961)
30	FW	CIV	Gerard Gohou
88	MF	RUS	Ruslan Kambolov (from (Russia) Arsenal Tula)
90	MF	RUS	Nikita Malyarov (from (Russia) Rotor Volgograd)

Out: Note: Flags indicate national team as defined under FIFA eligibility rules; some limited exceptions apply. Players may hold more than one non-FIFA nationality.

No.	Pos.	Nation	Player
1	GK	KAZ	Zhasur Narzikulov
2	DF	KAZ	Dinmukhamed Kashken
7	MF	RUS	Oleg Chernyshov
14	MF	CRO	Mate Crnčević (on loan to (Kazakhstan) Akzhayik)
16	GK	RUS	Sergei Revyakin
17	MF	KAZ	Esen Zhasanov (released, previously on loan to (Kazakhstan) Ekibastuz)
18	DF	CZE	Michal Jeřábek
19	DF	KAZ	Ardak Saulet (to (Kazakhstan) Akzhayik)
20	MF	KAZ	Yerkebulan Nurgaliyev (to (Kazakhstan) Caspiy)
23	MF	KAZ	Rifat Nurmugamet
28	MF	KAZ	Yury Pertsukh (loan return to (Kazakhstan) Astana)
29	MF	GEO	Zaza Tsitskishvili (to (Georgia (country)) Sioni Bolnisi)
33	FW	BLR	Ihar Zyankovich
39	MF	RUS	Nikita Laktionov
70	MF	UKR	Dmytro Korkishko
73	MF	KAZ	Didar Zhalmukan
88	MF	KAZ	Anton Shurigin
93	MF	MLI	Tongo Doumbia
94	MF	CMR	Hervaine Moukam (to (China) Qingdao Youth Island)
96	FW	KAZ	Maksim Fedin (to (Kazakhstan) Turan)

=== Akzhayik ===
In: Note: Flags indicate national team as defined under FIFA eligibility rules; some limited exceptions apply. Players may hold more than one non-FIFA nationality.

No.	Pos.	Nation	Player
1	GK	UKR	Kostyantyn Makhnovskyi (from (Ukraine) VPK-Ahro Shevchenkivka)
9	FW	MNE	Šaleta Kordić (from (Montenegro) Podgorica)
10	MF	RUS	Artur Gazdanov (from (Russia) Akron Tolyatti)
11	FW	UKR	Ihor Karpenko (from (Ukraine) Podillya Khmelnytskyi)
15	DF	KAZ	Ardak Saulet (from (Kazakhstan) Aktobe)
16	MF	BRA	Rafael Sabino
17	FW	KAZ	Oralkhan Omirtayev (from (Kazakhstan) Shakhter Karagandy)
32	DF	SRB	Miloš Stamenković (from (Ukraine) Rukh Lviv)
—	MF	CRO	Mate Crnčević (on loan from (Kazakhstan) Aktobe)
—	FW	LTU	Simonas Urbys (from (Lithuania) Banga Gargždai)
—	FW	BLR	Anton Saroka (from (Belarus) Neman Grodno)

Out: Note: Flags indicate national team as defined under FIFA eligibility rules; some limited exceptions apply. Players may hold more than one non-FIFA nationality.

No.	Pos.	Nation	Player
1	GK	UKR	Serhiy Litovchenko (to (Kazakhstan) Maktaaral)
4	DF	UKR	Artem Baranovskyi (to (Kazakhstan) Caspiy)
7	MF	RUS	Yevgeny Yatsky (to (Russia) Volga Ulyanovsk)
10	MF	KAZ	Yerkin Tapalov (to (Kazakhstan) Turan)
11	FW	MOZ	Reginaldo (to (Albania) Dinamo Tirana)
17	MF	RUS	Yevgeni Kozlov (from (Kazakhstan) Kyzylzhar)
20	MF	KAZ	Adlet Bolatov
21	MF	KAZ	Nauryzbek Zhagorov (to (Kazakhstan) Atyrau)
22	FW	UKR	Mykola Kovtalyuk (to (Kazakhstan) Shakhter Karagandy)
23	FW	UKR	Oleksiy Chychykov
28	DF	RUS	Soslan Takulov (to (Kazakhstan) Atyrau)
29	DF	KAZ	Maksim Litvinov
57	MF	RUS	Mikhail Gashchenkov (to (Russia) SKA-Khabarovsk)
99	MF	KAZ	Daniil Kochnev
—	FW	BLR	Anton Saroka
—	FW	LTU	Simonas Urbys (to (Lithuania) Sūduva)

=== Astana ===
In: Note: Flags indicate national team as defined under FIFA eligibility rules; some limited exceptions apply. Players may hold more than one non-FIFA nationality.

No.	Pos.	Nation	Player
3	DF	BLR	Artsyom Rakhmanaw (from (Belarus) Rukh Brest)
6	DF	BRA	Bryan (from (Kazakhstan) Atyrau)
11	MF	KAZ	Aslan Darabayev (from (Kazakhstan) Caspiy)
13	DF	ARM	Kamo Hovhannisyan (from (Kazakhstan) Kairat)
14	MF	FRA	Jérémy Manzorro (from (Kazakhstan) Tobol)
17	FW	KAZ	Abat Aymbetov (from (Russia) Krylia Sovetov, previously on loan)
23	DF	BLR	Dzyanis Palyakow (from (Kazakhstan) Kairat)
28	MF	KAZ	Yury Pertsukh (loan return from (Kazakhstan) Aktobe)
32	DF	KAZ	Talgat Kusyapov (loan return from (Kazakhstan) Caspiy)
33	DF	UKR	Danylo Beskorovainyi (loan from (Slovakia) DAC 1904)
34	GK	SRB	Marko Milošević (from (Kazakhstan) Caspiy)
—	FW	KAZ	Ramazan Karimov (loan return from (Kazakhstan) Caspiy)

Out: Note: Flags indicate national team as defined under FIFA eligibility rules; some limited exceptions apply. Players may hold more than one non-FIFA nationality.

No.	Pos.	Nation	Player
2	DF	SRB	Antonio Rukavina (Retired)
11	MF	ARM	Tigran Barseghyan (to (Slovakia) Slovan Bratislava)
17	FW	KAZ	Abat Aymbetov (loan return to (Russia) Krylia Sovetov)
21	DF	ESP	Cadete
19	DF	KAZ	Lev Skvortsov (to (Kazakhstan) Turan)
20	FW	MNE	Fatos Bećiraj (to (Montenegro) Dečić)
22	GK	KAZ	Dmytro Nepohodov (to (Kazakhstan) Tobol)
26	DF	ALB	Eneo Bitri (to (Albania) Partizani Tirana)
29	MF	KAZ	Madi Zhakipbayev
33	DF	MNE	Žarko Tomašević (to (Kazakhstan) Tobol)
87	MF	KAZ	Zhaslan Kairkenov (loan to (Kazakhstan) Aksu, previously on loan to (Kazakhstan) Atyrau)
91	MF	KAZ	Aldair Adilov (to (Kazakhstan) Kyzylzhar)
92	MF	MDA	Valeriu Ciupercă (to (Russia) Kuban Krasnodar)
99	FW	BIH	Semir Smajlagić (to (Uzbekistan) Nasaf, previously on loan to (Kazakhstan) Kyzylzhar)

=== Atyrau ===
In: Note: Flags indicate national team as defined under FIFA eligibility rules; some limited exceptions apply. Players may hold more than one non-FIFA nationality.

No.	Pos.	Nation	Player
1	GK	KAZ	Azamat Zhomartov (from (Kyrgyzstan) Alay Osh)
5	MF	LTU	Domantas Antanavičius (from (Slovenia) Celje)
6	MF	KAZ	Altynbek Saparov (from (Kazakhstan) Kyzylzhar)
8	MF	RUS	Soslan Takulov (from (Kazakhstan) Akzhayik)
11	MF	CRO	Andrija Filipović (from (Albania) Partizani Tirana)
13	DF	RUS	Nikolai Tarasov (from (Russia) Veles Moscow)
15	DF	KAZ	Aleksandr Sokolenko
16	GK	KAZ	Ilya Karavaev
17	FW	KAZ	Dias Kalybaev (from (Kazakhstan) Zhetysu)
18	DF	KAZ	Kuanysh Kalmuratov (loan return from (Kazakhstan) Turan)
19	MF	RUS	Anatoli Katrich
21	MF	KAZ	Nauryzbek Zhagorov (to (Kazakhstan) Akzhayik)
22	MF	KAZ	Magomed Paragulgov (from (Georgia (country)) Torpedo Kutaisi)
23	MF	KAZ	Amandyk Nabikhanov (from (Kazakhstan) Caspiy)
25	DF	POL	Paweł Baranowski (from (Poland) Górnik Łęczna)
30	DF	BRA	Matheus Bissi (from (Lithuania) Panevėžys)
—	MF	MKD	Milosh Tosheski (from (Serbia) Brodarac)

Out: Note: Flags indicate national team as defined under FIFA eligibility rules; some limited exceptions apply. Players may hold more than one non-FIFA nationality.

No.	Pos.	Nation	Player
1	GK	KAZ	Vladimir Loginovsky (to (Kazakhstan) Kyzylzhar)
5	MF	KAZ	Rafail Ospanov (to (Kazakhstan) Aksu)
7	MF	KAZ	Rinat Dzhumatov
9	FW	KAZ	Alexey Rodionov (to (Armenia) Alashkert)
11	MF	ARM	Artak Dashyan (to (Armenia) Pyunik)
12	GK	KAZ	Nurbolat Kalmenov
11	MF	BRA	Alex Bruno (to (Kazakhstan) Maktaaral)
14	DF	KAZ	Erasyl Amanzhol (to (Kazakhstan) Turan)
15	DF	BRA	Bryan (to (Kazakhstan) Astana)
17	DF	KAZ	Azat Ersalimov
18	MF	ARM	Solomon Udo (loan return to (Kazakhstan) Shakhter Karagandy)
19	DF	KAZ	Aybolat Makuov
20	MF	KAZ	Dauren Kayralliev
22	DF	HAI	Alex Junior (to (Kazakhstan) Taraz)
27	DF	KAZ	Viktor Dmitrenko (to (Kazakhstan) Caspiy)
28	DF	SRB	Danijel Stojković (to (Uzbekistan) Neftchi Fergana)
31	MF	BLR	Vladimir Medved
33	DF	RUS	Dmitry Guz (to (Armenia) Alashkert)
55	FW	SRB	Lazar Sajčić (to (Lithuania) Hegelmann)
82	MF	KAZ	Zhaslan Kairkenov (loan return to (Kazakhstan) Astana)
88	MF	BRA	Gian (to (Kazakhstan) Kyzylzhar)
—	MF	KAZ	Sanzhar Satanov (to (Kazakhstan) Turan)
—	MF	MKD	Milosh Tosheski (to (Serbia) Spartak Subotica)

=== Caspiy ===
In: Note: Flags indicate national team as defined under FIFA eligibility rules; some limited exceptions apply. Players may hold more than one non-FIFA nationality.

No.	Pos.	Nation	Player
8	MF	KAZ	Yerkebulan Nurgaliyev (from (Kazakhstan) Aktobe)
9	MF	KAZ	Aslan Adil (loan from (Kazakhstan) Zhetysu)
11	MF	KAZ	Duman Narzildayev (from (Kazakhstan) Aktobe)
13	FW	RUS	Pavel Kireyenko (from (Armenia) Noah)
21	MF	GEO	Rati Ardazishvili (from (Georgia (country)) Telavi)
22	DF	UKR	Artem Baranovskyi (from (Kazakhstan) Akzhayik)
28	DF	KAZ	Viktor Dmitrenko (from (Kazakhstan) Atyrau)
29	GK	MKD	Risto Jankov (from (North Macedonia) Rabotnički)
47	MF	KAZ	Arman Nusip (loan return from (Kazakhstan) Taraz)
77	FW	BRA	Ruan Teles (from (Romania) Argeș Pitești)

Out: Note: Flags indicate national team as defined under FIFA eligibility rules; some limited exceptions apply. Players may hold more than one non-FIFA nationality.

No.	Pos.	Nation	Player
6	DF	BLR	Aleksey Zaleski (to (Belarus) Torpedo-BelAZ Zhodino)
8	FW	BLR	Uladzimir Khvashchynski (loan return from (Belarus) Dinamo Minsk)
9	MF	TKM	Ruslan Mingazow (to (Hong Kong) Kitchee)
11	MF	KAZ	Aslan Darabayev (to (Kazakhstan) Astana)
13	MF	KAZ	Ruslan Sakhalbaev
15	MF	KAZ	Zhan-Ali Payruz (loan return from (Kazakhstan) Shakhter Karagandy)
18	FW	SRB	Nenad Gavrić (to (Greece) Xanthi)
21	MF	KAZ	Maksim Gladchenko
22	DF	KAZ	Talgat Kusyapov (loan return to (Kazakhstan) Astana)
23	MF	KAZ	Amandyk Nabikhanov (to (Kazakhstan) Atyrau)
33	DF	KAZ	Ilya Vorotnikov
77	MF	SRB	Miloš Stanojević (to (Serbia) Kolubara)
81	FW	KAZ	Ramazan Karimov (loan return to (Kazakhstan) Astana)
91	GK	SRB	Marko Milošević (to (Kazakhstan) Astana)
—	MF	SRB	Stefan Bukorac (to (Kazakhstan) Shakhter Karagandy, previously on loan)

=== Kairat ===
In: Note: Flags indicate national team as defined under FIFA eligibility rules; some limited exceptions apply. Players may hold more than one non-FIFA nationality.

No.	Pos.	Nation	Player
2	MF	KAZ	Sultanbek Astanov (loan return from (Kazakhstan) Ordabasy)
4	DF	RUS	Viktor Vasin (from (Russia) CSKA Moscow)
8	MF	UZB	Jasurbek Jaloliddinov (on loan from (Uzbekistan) Lokomotiv Tashkent)
14	MF	KAZ	Adam Adakhadzhiev (loan return from (Kazakhstan) Zhetysu)
15	DF	KAZ	Egor Tkachenko (on loan from (Russia) Kairat Moscow)
18	FW	KAZ	Vyacheslav Shvyryov (from (Russia) Kairat Moscow)
20	MF	RUS	Anton Krachkovsky (from (Russia) CSKA Moscow)
24	DF	KAZ	Damir Kasabulat (from (Russia) Kairat Moscow)
25	DF	CMR	David Ekwe (from (Cameroon) OFTA Kribi)
30	GK	RUS	Vadim Ulyanov (from (Russia) Kairat Moscow)

Out: Note: Flags indicate national team as defined under FIFA eligibility rules; some limited exceptions apply. Players may hold more than one non-FIFA nationality.

No.	Pos.	Nation	Player
1	GK	KAZ	Stas Pokatilov (to (Kazakhstan) Aktobe)
4	MF	KAZ	Nuraly Alip (loan to (Russia) Zenit St.Petersburg)
5	DF	KAZ	Gafurzhan Suyumbayev (to (Kazakhstan) Aksu)
8	MF	KAZ	Aybol Abiken (on loan to (Kazakhstan) Aksu)
9	FW	BRA	Vágner Love (to (Denmark) Midtjylland)
11	MF	KAZ	Yan Vorogovsky (on loan to (Belgium) RWDM47)
13	MF	ARM	Kamo Hovhannisyan (to (Kazakhstan) Astana)
20	DF	SRB	Rade Dugalić (to (China) Meizhou Hakka)
22	MF	MNE	Nebojša Kosović (to (China) Meizhou Hakka)
24	DF	CRO	Dino Mikanović (to (Croatia) Hajduk Split)
33	DF	BLR	Dzyanis Palyakow (to (Kazakhstan) Astana)
—	MF	KAZ	Alibi Tuzakbaev (released, previously on loan from (Kazakhstan) Oñtüstik Akademia)

=== Kyzylzhar ===
In: Note: Flags indicate national team as defined under FIFA eligibility rules; some limited exceptions apply. Players may hold more than one non-FIFA nationality.

No.	Pos.	Nation	Player
1	GK	KAZ	Vladimir Loginovsky (from (Kazakhstan) Atyrau)
2	MF	KAZ	Aldair Adilov (from (Kazakhstan) Astana)
4	DF	KAZ	Mark Gurman (from (Kazakhstan) Astana)
9	FW	BLR	Kiryl Sidarenka (from (Belarus) Dnepr Mogilev)
13	FW	RUS	Andrei Panyukov (loan from (Russia) Ural Yekaterinburg)
22	DF	SRB	Stefan Živković (from (Kazakhstan) Turan)
28	MF	MNE	Darko Zorić (from (Kazakhstan) Shakhter Karagandy)
33	DF	RUS	Aleksandr Dovbnya (from (Russia) Arsenal Tula)
35	FW	COD	Jordan Nkololo (from (Lithuania) Sūduva)
70	MF	UKR	Artur Murza (loan from (Ukraine) Metalist Kharkiv)
77	MF	RUS	Yevgeni Kozlov (from (Kazakhstan) Akzhayik)
88	MF	BRA	Gian (from (Kazakhstan) Atyrau)
94	FW	BRA	Lucas Cardoso (from (Albania) Partizani Tirana)

Out: Note: Flags indicate national team as defined under FIFA eligibility rules; some limited exceptions apply. Players may hold more than one non-FIFA nationality.

No.	Pos.	Nation	Player
1	GK	KAZ	Almat Bekbayev (to (Kazakhstan) Maktaaral)
4	DF	KAZ	Nurlan Dairov (to (Kazakhstan) Taraz)
6	DF	KAZ	Alibek Kasym (to (Kazakhstan) Aktobe)
7	MF	UKR	Maksym Drachenko (to (Kazakhstan) Okzhetpes)
9	FW	BIH	Semir Smajlagić (loan return to (Kazakhstan) Astana)
14	DF	RUS	Sergei Bugriyev (to (Belarus) Vitebsk)
20	MF	POR	Carlos Fonseca
23	MF	KAZ	Altynbek Saparov (to (Kazakhstan) Atyrau)
28	MF	MNE	Darko Zorić (to (Kazakhstan) Shakhter Karagandy)

=== Maktaaral ===
In: Note: Flags indicate national team as defined under FIFA eligibility rules; some limited exceptions apply. Players may hold more than one non-FIFA nationality.

No.	Pos.	Nation	Player
1	GK	UKR	Serhiy Litovchenko (from (Kazakhstan) Akzhayik)
3	DF	RUS	Yegor Potapov (from (Kazakhstan) Kaisar)
5	DF	BLR	Ruslan Yudenkov (from (Belarus) Gomel)
9	MF	KAZ	Rinat Dzhumatov (from (Kazakhstan) Atyrau)
10	MF	KAZ	Rifat Nurmugamet (from (Kazakhstan) Aktobe)
13	DF	KAZ	Ilyas Amirseitov (from (Kazakhstan) Kaisar)
17	MF	KAZ	Galymzhan Kenzhebek (from (Kazakhstan) Kairat)
19	MF	KAZ	Bekzat Zhaksybayuly (from (Kazakhstan) Kyran)
22	DF	KAZ	Nurzhigit Smatov (from (Kazakhstan) Turan)
23	MF	BLR	Pavel Chikida (from (Belarus) Gomel)
26	DF	MDA	Artiom Rozgoniuc (from (Moldova) Petrocub Hîncești)
29	MF	BRA	Alex Bruno (from (Kazakhstan) Atyrau)
53	MF	FRA	Billal Sebaihi
63	FW	TJK	Sheriddin Boboev (from (Malaysia) Penang)
70	GK	KAZ	Almat Bekbayev (from (Kazakhstan) Kyzylzhar)
88	MF	KAZ	Alibi Tuzakbaev (from (Kazakhstan) Kairat)
91	GK	KAZ	Zhandar Zhangaliev (from (Kazakhstan) Taraz)
95	MF	RUS	Rassambek Akhmatov
—	DF	UKR	Artur Zapadnya (from (Ukraine) Metalist 1925 Kharkiv)

Out: Note: Flags indicate national team as defined under FIFA eligibility rules; some limited exceptions apply. Players may hold more than one non-FIFA nationality.

No.	Pos.	Nation	Player
—	GK	KAZ	Kazhymukan Tolepbergen (loan return to (Kazakhstan) Ordabasy)
—	DF	UKR	Valeriy Stepanenko (to (Estonia) Tallinna Kalev)
—	MF	KAZ	Islam Yunusov (to (Kyrgyzstan) Dordoi Bishkek)
—	MF	KAZ	Madi Khaseyn (to (Kazakhstan) Zhetysu)
—	MF	KAZ	Vyacheslav Serdyukov (Retired)

=== Ordabasy ===
In: Note: Flags indicate national team as defined under FIFA eligibility rules; some limited exceptions apply. Players may hold more than one non-FIFA nationality.

No.	Pos.	Nation	Player
2	DF	UZB	Odil Abdumajidov (loan from (Uzbekistan) Metallurg Bekabad)
9	MF	UKR	Oleksandr Batyshchev (from (Belarus) Gomel)
12	MF	BRA	Victor Braga (from (Brazil) Londrina)
17	FW	TOG	Serge Nyuiadzi (from (Lithuania) Sūduva)
22	MF	CIV	Sékou Doumbia (from (Israel) Hapoel Hadera)
51	GK	KAZ	Kazhymukan Tolepbergen (loan return from (Kazakhstan) Maktaaral)
80	FW	RUS	Nikita Shershnyov (from (Russia) Mashuk-KMV Pyatigorsk)
99	MF	BRA	Luiz Guedes (from (Brazil) XV de Jaú)

Out: Note: Flags indicate national team as defined under FIFA eligibility rules; some limited exceptions apply. Players may hold more than one non-FIFA nationality.

No.	Pos.	Nation	Player
4	DF	KAZ	Kanat Ashirbay
7	MF	TJK	Mukhammadzhon Rakhimov (to (Tajikistan) Istiklol)
16	DF	KAZ	Rakhat Usipkhanov
17	MF	KAZ	Sultanbek Astanov (loan return to (Kazakhstan) Kairat)
18	MF	KAZ	Bagdat Zhienbai
19	FW	KAZ	Madizhan Aytbaev
21	MF	KAZ	Yerkebulan Tungyshbayev (to (Kazakhstan) Aksu)
22	MF	SEN	Abdoulaye Diakate (to (Kazakhstan) Turan)
23	MF	NGA	Chidi Osuchukwu (to (Kazakhstan) Turan)
24	DF	RUS	Aleksandr Kleshchenko (to (Kazakhstan) Turan)
30	FW	KAZ	Zhavlanbek Babanazarov
77	MF	KAZ	Shadman Bakirov
78	MF	KAZ	Murodzhon Khalmatov
86	GK	KAZ	Vladimir Plotnikov
87	DF	SRB	Aleksandar Simčević (to (Serbia) Železničar Pančevo)
91	MF	KAZ	Sergey Khizhnichenko (to (Kazakhstan) Aksu)
94	FW	UKR	Dmytro Khlyobas (to (Armenia) Urartu)

=== Shakhter Karagandy ===
In: Note: Flags indicate national team as defined under FIFA eligibility rules; some limited exceptions apply. Players may hold more than one non-FIFA nationality.

No.	Pos.	Nation	Player
6	MF	RUS	Amir Aduyev (on loan from (Russia) Akhmat Grozny)
7	FW	KAZ	Roman Murtazayev (from (Russia) Baltika Kaliningrad)
8	MF	SRB	Stefan Bukorac (from (Kazakhstan) Caspiy, previously on loan)
10	MF	ARM	Petros Avetisyan (from (Armenia) Noah)
11	DF	BIH	Đorđe Ćosić
17	DF	RUS	Kirill Malyarov
20	FW	KAZ	Toktar Zhangylyshbay
22	FW	UKR	Mykola Kovtalyuk (from (Kazakhstan) Akzhayik)
23	MF	KAZ	Timur Dosmagambetov (from (Kazakhstan) Taraz)
40	GK	KAZ	Yegor Tsuprikov (from (Kazakhstan) Tobol)
88	MF	COL	Roger Cañas (from (Chile) Barnechea)
—	DF	KAZ	Dinmuhammed Kashken
—	MF	MNE	Darko Zorić (from (Kazakhstan) Kyzylzhar)

Out: Note: Flags indicate national team as defined under FIFA eligibility rules; some limited exceptions apply. Players may hold more than one non-FIFA nationality.

No.	Pos.	Nation	Player
3	DF	MKD	David Atanaskoski (to (North Macedonia) Makedonija Gjorče Petrov)
7	MF	KAZ	Gevorg Najaryan (to (Armenia) Pyunik)
10	FW	RUS	Idris Umayev (loan return to (Russia) Akhmat Grozny)
11	MF	RUS	Alan Chochiyev
15	MF	GHA	David Mawutor (to (Malaysia) Negeri Sembilan)
16	DF	KAZ	Yeskendir Kybyrai (to (Kazakhstan) Aktobe)
18	MF	ARM	Solomon Udo (to Ararat-Armenia, previously on loan at (Kazakhstan) Atyrau)
19	FW	KAZ	Oralkhan Omirtayev (to (Kazakhstan) Akzhayik)
23	MF	KAZ	Ruslan Tutkyshev
24	FW	CAN	Aramis Kouzine (to (Denmark) Hobro)
25	DF	RUS	Andrey Buyvolov
29	MF	SRB	Vuk Mitošević (to (Serbia) Radnik Surdulica)
35	GK	KAZ	Ernar Saylauov
50	DF	KAZ	Tair Nurseitov
54	FW	KAZ	Maxim Galkin
57	DF	KAZ	Egor Alishauskas
70	MF	KAZ	Zhan-Ali Payruz (released, previously on loan at (Kazakhstan) Caspiy)
87	MF	RUS	Mikhail Bakayev (to (Kazakhstan) Aksu)
88	MF	RUS	Arsen Khubulov
89	FW	BUL	Martin Toshev (to (Bulgaria) CSKA 1948 Sofia)
99	FW	BLR	Yevgeniy Shikavka (to (Poland) Korona Kielce)
—	DF	KAZ	Dinmuhammed Kashken (to (Lithuania) Žalgiris)
—	MF	MNE	Darko Zorić (to (Kazakhstan) Kyzylzhar)

=== Taraz ===
In: Note: Flags indicate national team as defined under FIFA eligibility rules; some limited exceptions apply. Players may hold more than one non-FIFA nationality.

No.	Pos.	Nation	Player
3	DF	KAZ	Nurlan Dairov (from (Kazakhstan) Kyzylzhar)
4	DF	KAZ	Bekzat Shadmanov (from (Kazakhstan) Kaisar)
8	MF	BUL	Milen Gamakov (from (Lithuania) Žalgiris)
22	DF	HAI	Alex Junior (from (Kazakhstan) Atyrau)
30	FW	BRA	Jorge Elias (from (Lithuania) Panevėžys)
44	DF	GEO	Luka Gadrani (from (Latvia) Valmiera)
78	GK	RUS	Denis Kavlinov (from (Kazakhstan) Zhetysu)

Out: Note: Flags indicate national team as defined under FIFA eligibility rules; some limited exceptions apply. Players may hold more than one non-FIFA nationality.

No.	Pos.	Nation	Player
1	GK	KAZ	Almas Khamytbekov
3	DF	KAZ	Zhalgas Zhaksylykov
6	DF	KAZ	Berik Shaykhov (to (Kazakhstan) Zhetysu)
11	FW	KAZ	Gavril Kan
27	MF	KAZ	Dmitry Evstigneyev
31	GK	KAZ	Stanislav Shcherbakov
38	MF	SRB	Nenad Adamović (to (Belarus) Neman Grodno)
63	MF	CIV	Kódjo Alphonse (to (Armenia) Alashkert)
64	FW	KAZ	Arman Nusip (loan return to (Kazakhstan) Caspiy)
68	FW	KAZ	Ulan Konysbayev
72	DF	NGA	Faith Obilor (to (Kazakhstan) Aksu)
77	MF	KAZ	Kurmet Karaman
83	MF	KAZ	Timur Dosmagambetov (to (Kazakhstan) Shakhter Karagandy)
84	FW	POR	Erivaldo (from (Portugal) Leixões)
85	FW	SRB	Uroš Nenadović (to (Armenia) Pyunik)

=== Tobol ===
In: Note: Flags indicate national team as defined under FIFA eligibility rules; some limited exceptions apply. Players may hold more than one non-FIFA nationality.

No.	Pos.	Nation	Player
17	MF	KAZ	Vladislav Vasilyev (from (Belarus) Energetik-BGU Minsk)
23	GK	KAZ	Dmytro Nepohodov (from (Kazakhstan) Astana)
33	DF	MNE	Žarko Tomašević (from (Kazakhstan) Astana)
44	FW	KAZ	Aybar Zhaksylykov (from (Kazakhstan) Zhetysu)
94	MF	SVN	Rudi Požeg Vancaš (loan from (Ukraine) Chornomorets Odesa)

Out: Note: Flags indicate national team as defined under FIFA eligibility rules; some limited exceptions apply. Players may hold more than one non-FIFA nationality.

No.	Pos.	Nation	Player
11	MF	FRA	Jérémy Manzorro (to (Kazakhstan) Astana)
13	MF	KAZ	Azat Nurgaliyev (to (Kazakhstan) Turan)
15	MF	GNB	Toni Silva (to (Kazakhstan) Turan)
17	DF	KAZ	Ruslan Valiullin (Banned)
21	DF	KAZ	Sultan Abilgazy (to (Kazakhstan) Turan)
41	GK	KAZ	Yegor Tsuprikov (to (Kazakhstan) Shakhter Karagandy)
99	FW	GEO	Elguja Lobjanidze (to (Georgia (country)) Dinamo Batumi)

=== Turan ===
In: Note: Flags indicate national team as defined under FIFA eligibility rules; some limited exceptions apply. Players may hold more than one non-FIFA nationality.

No.	Pos.	Nation	Player
4	MF	KAZ	Sanzhar Satanov (from (Kazakhstan) Atyrau)
7	MF	KAZ	Yerkin Tapalov (from (Kazakhstan) Akzhayik)
15	MF	GNB	Toni Silva (from (Kazakhstan) Tobol)
17	FW	KAZ	Shokhan Abzalov (from (Kazakhstan) Kaisar)
—	MF	KAZ	Azat Nurgaliyev (from (Kazakhstan) Tobol)
21	DF	KAZ	Sultan Abilgazy (from (Kazakhstan) Tobol)
22	GK	AZE	Emil Balayev (from (Azerbaijan) Qarabağ)
23	MF	NGA	Chidi Osuchukwu (from (Kazakhstan) Ordabasy)
24	DF	RUS	Aleksandr Kleshchenko (from (Kazakhstan) Ordabasy)
25	MF	SEN	Abdoulaye Diakate (from (Kazakhstan) Ordabasy)
35	GK	KGZ	Erzhan Tokotayev (from (Kyrgyzstan) Alga Bishkek)
96	MF	KAZ	Maksim Fedin (from (Kazakhstan) Aktobe)
—	DF	CIV	Cédric Gogoua
—	DF	SLE	Raphael Koroma (from (Moldova) Sucleia)

Out: Note: Flags indicate national team as defined under FIFA eligibility rules; some limited exceptions apply. Players may hold more than one non-FIFA nationality.

No.	Pos.	Nation	Player
1	GK	KAZ	Stanislav Pavlov
2	DF	RUS	Layonel Adams (to (Armenia) Van)
3	DF	KGZ	Tamirlan Kozubayev (to (Hong Kong) Eastern)
4	DF	UKR	Yevhen Smirnov (to (Moldova) Sfîntul Gheorghe)
5	MF	KAZ	Bekzhan Alipbekov
6	DF	KAZ	Gafurzhan Nazarov
7	MF	KAZ	Shynbolat Maksymkhan
8	MF	KAZ	Bekzat Beysenov
12	GK	KAZ	Dauren Tokmagambetov
14	MF	MNE	Branislav Janković (to (Montenegro) Budućnost Podgorica)
17	MF	KAZ	Mardan Tolebek
18	MF	KAZ	Bakdaulet Akbergen
20	GK	KAZ	Andrey Pasechenko (to (Kazakhstan) Zhetysu)
24	DF	SRB	Stefan Živković (to (Kazakhstan) Kyzylzhar)
23	MF	KAZ	Nurgaini Buribayev (to (Kazakhstan) Okzhetpes)
24	MF	SRB	Milan Stojanović (to (Kazakhstan) Okzhetpes)
25	DF	BLR	Aleksandr Chizh (loan return to (Belarus) Dinamo Minsk)
57	MF	RUS	Pavel Deobald
69	MF	RUS	Nikita Bocharov
77	DF	KAZ	Kuanysh Kalmuratov (loan return to (Kazakhstan) Atyrau)
78	FW	KAZ	Pavel Kriventsev
89	MF	UKR	Yevhen Chumak (to (Uzbekistan) Dinamo Samarqand)
95	FW	MKD	Samir Fazli (to (North Macedonia) Makedonija Gjorče Petrov)
99	FW	NGA	Stanley (to (Kazakhstan) Zhetysu)
—	MF	KAZ	Rodion Minaripov
