= List of Kazakhstan football transfers summer 2022 =

This is a list of Kazakh football transfers in the summer transfer window 2022 by club, running from 28 June to 26 July. Only clubs of the 2022 Kazakhstan Premier League are included.

== Kazakhstan Premier League 2022 ==
=== Aksu ===
In: Note: Flags indicate national team as defined under FIFA eligibility rules; some limited exceptions apply. Players may hold more than one non-FIFA nationality.

No.	Pos.	Nation	Player
6	MF	SRB	Lazar Zličić (from (Hungary) Kisvárda)
27	DF	KAZ	Ruslan Yesimov (from (Kazakhstan) Kyzylzhar)
77	FW	GNB	Toni Silva (from (Kazakhstan) Turan)
96	DF	UKR	Oleksiy Dytyatyev (from (Poland) MKS Cracovia)

Out: Note: Flags indicate national team as defined under FIFA eligibility rules; some limited exceptions apply. Players may hold more than one non-FIFA nationality.

No.	Pos.	Nation	Player
6	DF	RUS	Ali Gadzhibekov
9	FW	LBR	Sam Johnson
10	MF	KAZ	Rafail Ospanov (to (Kazakhstan) Kyzylzhar)
14	MF	KAZ	Izat Kulzhanov
23	MF	KAZ	Dmitry Bachek
27	DF	KAZ	Pavel Barkunov (to (Kazakhstan) Zhenis)
28	FW	KAZ	Asyl Myrzakhan
91	FW	KAZ	Sergey Khizhnichenko
91	MF	UKR	Yevhen Zadoya (to (Ukraine) Kolos Kovalivka)
96	MF	KAZ	Aybol Abiken (loan return to (Kazakhstan) Kairat)
99	MF	RSA	May Mahlangu
—	MF	KAZ	Matvey Matvienko (released, previously on loan to (Kazakhstan) Ekibastuz)

=== Aktobe ===
In: Note: Flags indicate national team as defined under FIFA eligibility rules; some limited exceptions apply. Players may hold more than one non-FIFA nationality.

No.	Pos.	Nation	Player
18	MF	KAZ	Bauyrzhan Baytana (from (Kazakhstan) Taraz)

Out: Note: Flags indicate national team as defined under FIFA eligibility rules; some limited exceptions apply. Players may hold more than one non-FIFA nationality.

No.	Pos.	Nation	Player
90	MF	RUS	Nikita Malyarov
—	MF	CRO	Mate Crnčević (released, previously on loan to (Kazakhstan) Akzhayik)

=== Akzhayik ===
In: Note: Flags indicate national team as defined under FIFA eligibility rules; some limited exceptions apply. Players may hold more than one non-FIFA nationality.

No.	Pos.	Nation	Player
1	GK	UKR	Rodion Syamuk (from (Belarus) Dynamo Brest)
22	FW	GEO	Toma Tabatadze (from (Georgia (country)) Sioni Bolnisi)
45	FW	SRB	Djordje Ivkovic (from (Serbia) IMT)
90	MF	UKR	Illya Kovalenko (from (Ukraine) LNZ Cherkasy)
91	DF	BLR	Pavel Nazarenko (from (Kazakhstan) Shakhter Karagandy)
96	MF	RUS	Aleksandr Vulfov (from (Russia) Veles Moscow)

Out: Note: Flags indicate national team as defined under FIFA eligibility rules; some limited exceptions apply. Players may hold more than one non-FIFA nationality.

No.	Pos.	Nation	Player
11	FW	UKR	Ihor Karpenko (to (Poland) Odra Wodzisław Śląski)
13	DF	KAZ	Miram Sapanov (to (Kazakhstan) Shakhter Karagandy)
20	MF	KAZ	Magommed Odzhiev
22	MF	CRO	Mate Crnčević (loan return to (Kazakhstan) Aktobe)
32	DF	SRB	Miloš Stamenković (to Ararat-Armenia)
45	FW	SRB	Djordje Ivkovic
96	MF	KAZ	Ivan Antipov (to (Russia) Peresvet Podolsk)

=== Astana ===
In: Note: Flags indicate national team as defined under FIFA eligibility rules; some limited exceptions apply. Players may hold more than one non-FIFA nationality.

No.	Pos.	Nation	Player
5	DF	KAZ	Mikhail Gabyshev (from (Kazakhstan) Shakhter Karagandy)
19	FW	FRA	Keelan Lebon (from (Bulgaria) Beroe Stara Zagora)
27	MF	KAZ	Timur Dosmagambetov (from (Kazakhstan) Shakhter Karagandy)

Out: Note: Flags indicate national team as defined under FIFA eligibility rules; some limited exceptions apply. Players may hold more than one non-FIFA nationality.

No.	Pos.	Nation	Player
18	DF	KAZ	Sagi Sovet (on loan to (Kazakhstan) Maktaaral)
21	FW	LBR	Mohammed Kamara (loan return to (Turkey) Hatayspor)
—	FW	CUW	Rangelo Janga (to (Cyprus) Apollon Limassol, previously on loan)

=== Atyrau ===
In: Note: Flags indicate national team as defined under FIFA eligibility rules; some limited exceptions apply. Players may hold more than one non-FIFA nationality.

No.	Pos.	Nation	Player
17	FW	RUS	Denis Mitrofanov (from (Russia) Kairat Moscow)
19	MF	TJK	Khusrav Toirov (from (Tajikistan) Dynamo Dushanbe)
21	FW	RUS	Pavel Dolgov (from (Russia) Metallurg Lipetsk)
22	MF	KAZ	Rinat Dzhumatov (from (Kazakhstan) Maktaaral)
28	MF	RUS	Yuri Zavezyon (from (Russia) Metallurg Lipetsk)

Out: Note: Flags indicate national team as defined under FIFA eligibility rules; some limited exceptions apply. Players may hold more than one non-FIFA nationality.

No.	Pos.	Nation	Player
9	FW	BRA	Allef
18	DF	KAZ	Kuanysh Kalmuratov (to (Kazakhstan) Taraz)
19	MF	RUS	Anatoli Katrich (to (Russia) Amkal Moscow)
22	MF	KAZ	Magomed Paragulgov
29	FW	KAZ	Mukagali Pangerey (on loan to (Kazakhstan) Okzhetpes)
33	FW	KAZ	Bauyrzhan Turysbek (to (Kazakhstan) Zhetysu)

=== Caspiy ===
In: Note: Flags indicate national team as defined under FIFA eligibility rules; some limited exceptions apply. Players may hold more than one non-FIFA nationality.

No.	Pos.	Nation	Player
7	MF	CRO	Ivan Pešić (from (Belarus) Dinamo Minsk)
81	MF	KAZ	Maksim Vaganov (from (Kazakhstan) Ordabasy)
91	MF	POR	Rúben Brígido (from (Kazakhstan) Tobol)
92	GK	RUS	Aleksei Kozlov (from (Belarus) Minsk)
95	MF	KAZ	Alisher Suley (from (Kazakhstan) Taraz)

Out: Note: Flags indicate national team as defined under FIFA eligibility rules; some limited exceptions apply. Players may hold more than one non-FIFA nationality.

No.	Pos.	Nation	Player
7	MF	KAZ	Bekzat Kabylan (on loan to (Kazakhstan) Turan)
20	DF	KAZ	Ruslan Zhanysbaev (on loan to (Kazakhstan) Turan)
26	MF	KAZ	Altynbek Murzabekov
29	GK	MKD	Risto Jankov (to (Romania) Politehnica Iași)
47	MF	KAZ	Arman Nusip
98	DF	KAZ	Niyaz Shugaev

=== Kairat ===
In: Note: Flags indicate national team as defined under FIFA eligibility rules; some limited exceptions apply. Players may hold more than one non-FIFA nationality.

No.	Pos.	Nation	Player
13	DF	KAZ	Lev Kurgin (from (Russia) Kairat Moscow)
15	DF	KAZ	Egor Tkachenko (from (Russia) Kairat Moscow)
25	DF	KAZ	Aleksandr Shirobokov (loan return from (Russia) Kairat Moscow)
26	MF	KAZ	Adilet Sadybekov (from (Russia) Kairat Moscow)
28	MF	KAZ	Rustam Emirov (from (Russia) Kairat Moscow)
—	GK	KAZ	Nikita Pivkin (from (Russia) Kairat Moscow)
—	FW	KAZ	Bayzhan Madelkhan (from (Russia) Kairat Moscow)

Out: Note: Flags indicate national team as defined under FIFA eligibility rules; some limited exceptions apply. Players may hold more than one non-FIFA nationality.

No.	Pos.	Nation	Player
6	MF	POL	Jacek Góralski (to (Germany) VfL Bochum)
8	MF	UZB	Jasurbek Jaloliddinov (loan return to (Uzbekistan) Lokomotiv Tashkent)
10	FW	GUI	José Kanté (to (China) Cangzhou Mighty Lions)
16	MF	POR	Ricardo Alves (to (Iran) Tractor)
25	DF	CMR	David Ekwe
—	GK	KAZ	Nikita Pivkin (on loan to (Russia) Elektron Veliky Novgorod)
—	MF	KAZ	Yan Vorogovsky (to (Belgium) RWDM, previously on loan)
—	MF	KAZ	Alen Aimanov (on loan to (Kazakhstan) Turan)
—	FW	GER	Streli Mamba (to (China) Dalian Professional, previously on loan to (Germany) Hansa Rostock)
—	FW	KAZ	Bayzhan Madelkhan (on loan to (Russia) Murom)

=== Kyzylzhar ===
In: Note: Flags indicate national team as defined under FIFA eligibility rules; some limited exceptions apply. Players may hold more than one non-FIFA nationality.

No.	Pos.	Nation	Player
6	MF	KAZ	Rafail Ospanov (from (Kazakhstan) Aksu)
9	FW	GEO	Elguja Lobjanidze (from (Georgia (country)) Dinamo Batumi)
11	MF	KAZ	Yerkin Tapalov (from (Kazakhstan) Turan)
22	FW	GEO	Giorgi Ivaniadze (from (Georgia (country)) Dila Gori)
25	FW	RUS	Maksim Chikanchi (from (Russia) Krasava)
33	DF	CRO	Mateo Mužek (from (Slovenia) Radomlje)
94	DF	KAZ	Viktor Zyabko (from (Kazakhstan) Yassy)

Out: Note: Flags indicate national team as defined under FIFA eligibility rules; some limited exceptions apply. Players may hold more than one non-FIFA nationality.

No.	Pos.	Nation	Player
13	FW	RUS	Andrei Panyukov (loan return to (Russia) Ural Yekaterinburg)
22	DF	SRB	Stefan Živković
25	DF	KAZ	Ruslan Yesimov
33	DF	RUS	Aleksandr Dovbnya (to (Russia) Amkal Moscow)
35	FW	COD	Jordan Nkololo (to (Saudi Arabia) Al-Shaeib)
70	MF	UKR	Artur Murza (loan return to (Ukraine) Metalist Kharkiv)
94	FW	BRA	Lucas Cardoso (to (Kosovo) Ballkani)
99	FW	KAZ	Maksim Skorykh (on loan to (Kazakhstan) Zhenis)
—	DF	KAZ	Erasyl Seitkanov (released, previously on loan to (Kazakhstan) Zhenis)
—	FW	KAZ	Artem Cheredinov (released, previously on loan to (Kazakhstan) Zhenis)

=== Maktaaral ===
In: Note: Flags indicate national team as defined under FIFA eligibility rules; some limited exceptions apply. Players may hold more than one non-FIFA nationality.

No.	Pos.	Nation	Player
2	MF	BLR	Aleksey Nosko (on loan from (Belarus) BATE Borisov)
8	MF	CIV	Sékou Doumbia (from (Kazakhstan) Ordabasy)
10	MF	KGZ	Odilzhon Abdurakhmanov (from (Uzbekistan) Bunyodkor)
11	DF	KAZ	Sagi Sovet (on loan from (Kazakhstan) Astana)
13	GK	KAZ	Ramil Nurmukhametov (from (Kazakhstan) Kyran)
88	MF	CIV	Yao Léonard Djaha (from (Belarus) Smorgon)

Out: Note: Flags indicate national team as defined under FIFA eligibility rules; some limited exceptions apply. Players may hold more than one non-FIFA nationality.

No.	Pos.	Nation	Player
6	DF	KAZ	Vladimir Sedelnikov
8	DF	KAZ	Erbolat Rustemov (to (Kazakhstan) Zhetysu)
9	MF	KAZ	Rinat Dzhumatov (to (Kazakhstan) Atyrau)
10	MF	KAZ	Rifat Nurmugamet (to (Azerbaijan) Sumgayit)
11	FW	KAZ	Edige Oralbay (to (Kazakhstan) Zhetysu)
13	DF	KAZ	Ilyas Amirseitov (to (Kazakhstan) Zhetysu)
63	FW	TJK	Sheriddin Boboyev (to (Iran) Sanat Naft Abadan)
70	GK	KAZ	Almat Bekbayev
88	MF	KAZ	Alibi Tuzakbaev (to (Kazakhstan) Zhetysu)

=== Ordabasy ===
In: Note: Flags indicate national team as defined under FIFA eligibility rules; some limited exceptions apply. Players may hold more than one non-FIFA nationality.

No.	Pos.	Nation	Player
6	DF	SRB	Dominik Dinga (from (Russia) Ural Yekaterinburg)
7	MF	BLR	Dzmitry Baradzin (from (Belarus) Dinamo Minsk)
11	MF	KAZ	Maksim Fedin (from (Kazakhstan) Turan)
49	MF	UZB	Shokhboz Umarov (from (Belarus) BATE Borisov)
98	MF	KAZ	Akmal Bakhtiyarov (from (Russia) Olimp-Dolgoprudny)
71	MF	RUS	Igor Klyushkin (from (Russia) Arsenal Tula)

Out: Note: Flags indicate national team as defined under FIFA eligibility rules; some limited exceptions apply. Players may hold more than one non-FIFA nationality.

No.	Pos.	Nation	Player
5	DF	KAZ	Nurali Mamirbayev
7	DF	KAZ	Asludin Hadzhiev
11	MF	KAZ	Maksim Vaganov (on loan to (Kazakhstan) Caspiy)
22	MF	CIV	Sékou Doumbia (to (Kazakhstan) Maktaaral)
33	DF	UKR	Yevhen Chahovets

=== Shakhter ===
In: Note: Flags indicate national team as defined under FIFA eligibility rules; some limited exceptions apply. Players may hold more than one non-FIFA nationality.

No.	Pos.	Nation	Player
3	DF	BLR	Aleksandr Poznyak (from (Belarus) Minsk)
5	DF	RUS	Temur Mustafin (from (Armenia) Noravank)
6	MF	GEO	Temur Chogadze (from (Georgia (country)) Gagra)
13	DF	KAZ	Miram Sapanov (from (Kazakhstan) Akzhayik)
17	MF	KAZ	Ibragim Dadaev (on loan from (Kazakhstan) Kairat)
21	MF	KGZ	Farkhat Musabekov (from (Kazakhstan) Turan)
99	FW	RUS	Yevgeni Kobzar (from (Armenia) Noravank)

Out: Note: Flags indicate national team as defined under FIFA eligibility rules; some limited exceptions apply. Players may hold more than one non-FIFA nationality.

No.	Pos.	Nation	Player
5	DF	KAZ	Mikhail Gabyshev (to (Kazakhstan) Astana)
6	MF	RUS	Amir Aduyev (loan return to (Russia) Akhmat Grozny)
10	MF	ARM	Petros Avetisyan
13	DF	BLR	Pavel Nazarenko (to (Kazakhstan) Akzhayik)
17	DF	RUS	Kirill Malyarov (to (Russia) Baltika Kaliningrad)
23	MF	KAZ	Timur Dosmagambetov (to (Kazakhstan) Astana)
27	DF	RUS	Vladimir Khozin
33	DF	CMR	Abdel Lamanje
37	FW	KAZ	Shyngys Flyuk

=== Taraz ===
In: Note: Flags indicate national team as defined under FIFA eligibility rules; some limited exceptions apply. Players may hold more than one non-FIFA nationality.

No.	Pos.	Nation	Player
18	MF	KAZ	Kuanysh Kalmuratov (from (Kazakhstan) Atyrau)
79	FW	UKR	Maksym Dehtyarov (from (Ukraine) Desna Chernihiv)

Out: Note: Flags indicate national team as defined under FIFA eligibility rules; some limited exceptions apply. Players may hold more than one non-FIFA nationality.

No.	Pos.	Nation	Player
10	MF	KAZ	Bauyrzhan Baytana (to (Kazakhstan) Aktobe)
30	FW	BRA	Jorge Elias
77	MF	KAZ	Alisher Suley (to (Kazakhstan) Caspiy)

=== Tobol ===
In: Note: Flags indicate national team as defined under FIFA eligibility rules; some limited exceptions apply. Players may hold more than one non-FIFA nationality.

No.	Pos.	Nation	Player
21	FW	SRB	Miljan Vukadinović (from (Serbia) Vojvodina)
88	GK	RUS	Timur Akmurzin (from (Russia) Spartak Moscow)
89	FW	CIV	Serges Déblé (from (Armenia) Pyunik)
93	MF	NGA	Chidi Osuchukwu (from (Kazakhstan) Turan)

Out: Note: Flags indicate national team as defined under FIFA eligibility rules; some limited exceptions apply. Players may hold more than one non-FIFA nationality.

No.	Pos.	Nation	Player
7	DF	KAZ	Dmitri Miroshnichenko (to (Russia) Chernomorets Novorossiysk)
18	MF	POR	Rúben Brígido (to (Kazakhstan) Caspiy)
23	GK	KAZ	Dmytro Nepohodov (to (Ukraine) Chornomorets Odesa)
94	MF	SVN	Rudi Požeg Vancaš (loan return to (Ukraine) Chornomorets Odesa)

=== Turan ===
In: Note: Flags indicate national team as defined under FIFA eligibility rules; some limited exceptions apply. Players may hold more than one non-FIFA nationality.

No.	Pos.	Nation	Player
7	MF	KAZ	Bekzat Kabylan (on loan from (Kazakhstan) Caspiy)
8	DF	KAZ	Ruslan Zhanysbaev (on loan from (Kazakhstan) Caspiy)
15	MF	BLR	Oleg Yevdokimov (from (Belarus) Minsk)
21	MF	BLR	Artem Gurenko (from (Belarus) Belshina Bobruisk)
22	DF	KAZ	Timur Rudoselsky (from (Armenia) Noravank)
24	GK	KAZ	Dinmukhammed Zhomart (from (Russia) Kairat Moscow)
54	DF	MNE	Zvonko Ceklić (from (Montenegro) Zeta)
57	MF	KAZ	Alen Aimanov (on loan from (Kazakhstan) Kairat)

Out: Note: Flags indicate national team as defined under FIFA eligibility rules; some limited exceptions apply. Players may hold more than one non-FIFA nationality.

No.	Pos.	Nation	Player
7	MF	KAZ	Yerkin Tapalov (to (Kazakhstan) Kyzylzhar)
8	MF	KGZ	Farkhat Musabekov (to (Kazakhstan) Shakhter Karagandy)
15	MF	GNB	Toni Silva (to (Kazakhstan) Aksu)
18	FW	KAZ	Bakdaulet Zulfikarov
21	DF	KAZ	Sultan Abilgazy
22	GK	AZE	Emil Balayev (to (Azerbaijan) Sabail)
23	MF	NGA	Chidi Osuchukwu (to (Kazakhstan) Tobol)
24	DF	RUS	Aleksandr Kleshchenko (to (Russia) Rodina Moscow)
96	MF	KAZ	Maksim Fedin (to (Kazakhstan) Ordabasy)
