= Marko Milošević (footballer) =

Serbian footballer

Personal information
- Date of birth: 7 February 1991 (age 35)
- Place of birth: Belgrade, SFR Yugoslavia
- Height: 1.87 m (6 ft 2 in)
- Position: Goalkeeper

Team information
- Current team: Partizan
- Number: 1

Senior career*
Years	Team	Apps	(Gls)
2009–2012	Zemun	11	(0)
2010–2011	→ Grafičar Beograd (loan)	29	(0)
2012–2013	Radnički Nova Pazova	11	(0)
2013–2014	Smederevo	14	(0)
2014	Sinđelić Beograd	2	(0)
2015–2017	Voždovac	20	(0)
2017–2019	Zemun	54	(0)
2019	Napredak Kruševac	20	(0)
2020–2021	Caspiy	43	(0)
2022	Astana	15	(0)
2023	Debrecen	8	(0)
2024	Borac Banja Luka	14	(0)
2024–2025	Radnički 1923	26	(0)
2025–	Partizan	43	(0)
- * Club domestic league appearances and goals as of 22 November 2026

Marko Milošević (Serbian Cyrillic: Марко Милошевић; born 7 February 1991) is a Serbian footballer who plays as a goalkeeper for Partizan.

== Club career ==
On 14 January 2022, Milošević signed for Astana on a contract until the end of 2023.

On 1 March 2023, Milošević joined Debrecen in Hungary.

On 12 January 2024, he moved to Borac Banja Luka in Bosnia and Herzegovina.

== Honours ==
Astana

- Kazakhstan Premier League: 2022

Borac Banja Luka

- Bosnian Premier League: 2023–24

Individual

- Serbian SuperLiga Player of the Week: 2024–25 (Round 32)
