= Yao Léonard Djaha =

Ivorian footballer

Personal information
- Full name: Yao Léonard Djaha
- Date of birth: 4 November 2001 (age 25)
- Place of birth: Ivory Coast
- Height: 1.78 m (5 ft 10 in)
- Position: Midfielder

Team information
- Current team: Moroka Swallows

Youth career
- 2017–2020: ASEC Mimosas

Senior career*
Years	Team	Apps	(Gls)
2021	Sucleia	9	(1)
2021	Smorgon	2	(0)
2022	Maktaaral	9	(0)
2023	Belshina Bobruisk	24	(2)
2024–	Moroka Swallows	1	(0)
- * Club domestic league appearances and goals as of 31 May 2024

Yao Léonard Djaha (born 4 November 2001) is an Ivorian professional footballer who plays as a midfielder for Moroka Swallows.
