= Oleg Yevdokimov =

Belarusian footballer

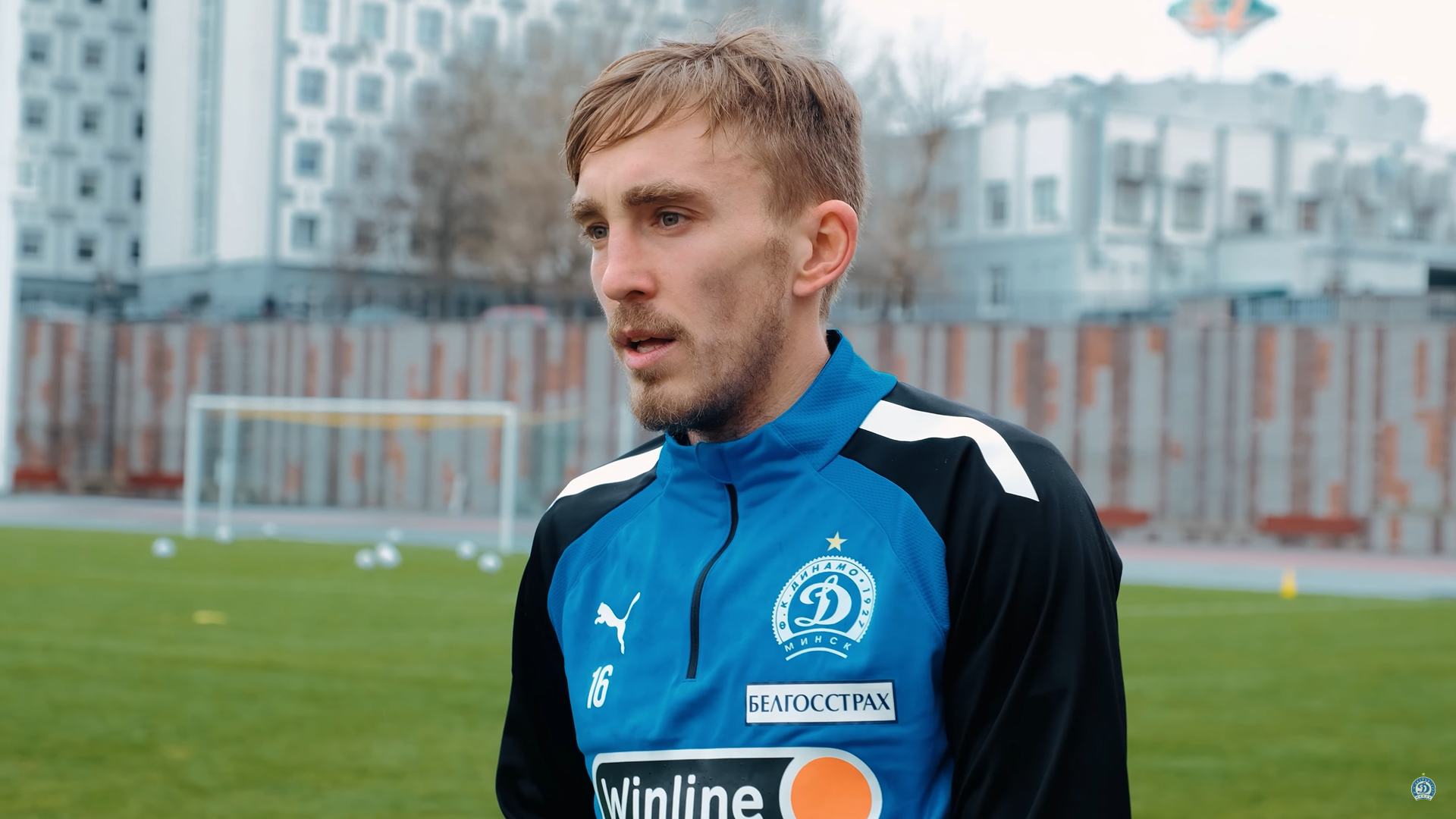

Personal information
- Date of birth: 25 February 1994 (age 32)
- Place of birth: Minsk, Belarus
- Height: 1.75 m (5 ft 9 in)
- Position: Midfielder

Team information
- Current team: Neman Grodno
- Number: 15

Youth career
- 2011–2013: Minsk

Senior career*
Years	Team	Apps	(Gls)
2013–2018	Minsk	114	(4)
2014	→ Minsk-2	25	(3)
2019	Neman Grodno	27	(1)
2020–2022	Minsk	61	(2)
2022	Turan	8	(1)
2023	Dinamo Minsk	8	(0)
2023–	Neman Grodno	73	(4)

International career
2013–2016	Belarus U21	30	(2)
2017	Belarus B	1	(0)
2017	Belarus	2	(0)
- * Club domestic league appearances and goals as of 3 July 2026

Oleg Yevdokimov (Belarusian: Алег Еўдакімаў; Russian: Олег Евдокимов; born 25 February 1994) is a Belarusian footballer who plays for Neman Grodno.
