= Paweł Baranowski =

Polish footballer

Personal information
- Full name: Paweł Baranowski
- Date of birth: 11 October 1990 (age 36)
- Place of birth: Suwałki, Poland
- Height: 1.90 m (6 ft 3 in)
- Position: Defender

Team information
- Current team: Beskid Skoczów
- Number: 25

Youth career
- Wigry Suwałki
- Jagiellonia Białystok

Senior career*
Years	Team	Apps	(Gls)
2007–2008	Wigry Suwałki		
2008–2010	Podbeskidzie	6	(0)
2010–2013	Stomil Olsztyn	90	(10)
2013–2015	GKS Bełchatów	66	(5)
2015–2016	Erzgebirge Aue	2	(0)
2016	Podbeskidzie	14	(1)
2017	Wigry Suwałki	5	(0)
2017–2018	Stomil Olsztyn	32	(3)
2018–2019	Odra Opole	30	(0)
2019–2022	Górnik Łęczna	72	(0)
2022	Atyrau	22	(0)
2023–2024	Ruch Chorzów	17	(0)
2024–2025	GKS Jastrzębie	24	(0)
2025–2026	Kuźnia Ustroń	12	(1)
2026–	Beskid Skoczów	14	(5)

International career
2008	Poland U19	1	(0)
- * Club domestic league appearances and goals as of 09:42, 15 June 2026 (UTC)

Paweł Baranowski (born 11 October 1990) is a Polish professional footballer who plays as a defender for V liga Silesia club Beskid Skoczów.

== Honours ==
GKS Bełchatów

- I liga: 2013–14

Górnik Łęczna

- II liga: 2019–20
