= Pavel Chikida =

Belarusian professional footballer

Personal information
- Date of birth: 21 June 1995 (age 31)
- Place of birth: Smolevichi, Minsk Oblast, Belarus
- Height: 1.78 m (5 ft 10 in)
- Position: Midfielder

Team information
- Current team: Slavia Mozyr
- Number: 27

Youth career
- 2009: BATE Borisov
- 2012: Torpedo-BelAZ Zhodino

Senior career*
Years	Team	Apps	(Gls)
2013–2018	Smolevichi	125	(3)
2015	→ Krumkachy Minsk (loan)	15	(0)
2019	Dnyapro Mogilev	16	(0)
2020–2021	Gomel	51	(0)
2022	Maktaaral	12	(0)
2023–	Slavia Mozyr	70	(9)
- * Club domestic league appearances and goals as of 6 July 2026

Pavel Chikida (Belarusian: Павел Чыкіда; Russian: Павел Чикида; born 21 June 1995) is a Belarusian professional footballer who plays for Belarusian Premier League club Slavia Mozyr.

== Honours ==
Gomel

- Belarusian Cup winner: 2021–22
