= FC Aksu =

Kazakh football club

- Full name: Football Club Aksu; Ақсу футбол клубы
- Founded: 2018; 8 years ago
- Ground: Central Stadium
- Capacity: 11,828
- Chairman: Bauyrzhan Zhenyshbayev
- Manager: Samat Abdurakhmanov
- League: Kazakhstan Premier League
- 2022: 6th
- Website: https://fcaqsu.kz/
Home colours	Away colours

FC Aksu (Kazakh: Ақсу футбол клубы) is a Kazakhstani football club based in Pavlodar.

== History ==
On 19 January 2022, Ruslan Kostyshyn was appointed as Aksu's Head Coach.

=== Domestic history ===
Season	Level	Pos	Pld	W	D	L	For	Against	Points	Domestic Cup	Top goalscorer	Kit Manufacturer	Main Sponsor
2018	3rd	15	40	11	10	19	63	93	43	—N/a	(7)		
2019	3rd	13	32	9	7	15	47	63	35	Group stage	(8)		
2020	3rd	1	4	3	1	0	9	2	10	—N/a	Askar Azhikenov (5)		
2021	2nd	1	22	15	5	2	53	19	50	Third Round	Miras Turlybek (21)		
2022	1st	6	26	11	3	12	32	37	36	Group Stage	Yerkebulan Tungyshbayev (8)	Adidas	Parimatch
2023	1st	14	5	3	30|42		18	Round of 16	Miras Turlybek (3)				

== Honours ==
- Kazakhstan Second League
  - Champions (1): 2020
- Kazakhstan First League
  - Champions (1): 2021

== Squad ==
As of 8 December 2023

Note: Flags indicate national team as defined under FIFA eligibility rules; some limited exceptions apply. Players may hold more than one non-FIFA nationality.

No.	Pos.	Nation	Player
3	DF	SRB	Marko Nikolić
4	DF	KAZ	Daniil Nyrkov
5	DF	NGA	Faith Obilor
6	DF	HAI	Alex Junior
7	MF	CPV	Mailson Lima
8	DF	KAZ	Ular Zhaksybaev
11	MF	KAZ	Damir Marat
16	MF	KAZ	Anatoly Krasotin
17	FW	KAZ	Miras Turlybek

No.	Pos.	Nation	Player
21	GK	KAZ	Mikhail Golubnichy
25	DF	KAZ	Ruslan Yesimov
30	MF	KAZ	Tamerlan Agimanov
70	MF	KAZ	Alisher Suley
77	MF	KAZ	Aslanbek Kakimov
89	GK	RUS	Arsen Siukayev
92	MF	RUS	Yevgeni Kobzar
93	MF	NGA	Chidi Osuchukwu
95	MF	GHA	David Mawutor
