= Domantas Antanavičius =

Lithuanian footballer (born 1998)

Personal information
- Date of birth: 18 November 1998 (age 27)
- Place of birth: Marijampolė, Lithuania
- Height: 1.76 m (5 ft 9 in)
- Position: Midfielder

Team information
- Current team: FK Sūduva

Youth career
- –2015: Sūduva

Senior career*
Years	Team	Apps	(Gls)
2015–2018	Sūduva	31	(0)
2018–2019	Stumbras	19	(1)
2019–2020	Maardu Linnameeskond	13	(1)
2020–2022	Celje	9	(0)
2020	→ Triglav Kranj (loan)	1	(0)
2021	→ Panevėžys (loan)	32	(0)
2022–2023	Atyrau	39	(0)
2024–2025	Hegelmann	69	(5)
2026–	Sūduva	3	(0)

International career^{‡}
2016	Lithuania U19	3	(0)
2017–2020	Lithuania U21	12	(1)
2024–	Lithuania	6	(0)
- * Club domestic league appearances and goals as of 12 March 2026 ‡ National team caps and goals as of 7 September 2025

Domantas Antanavičius (born 18 November 1998) is a Lithuanian footballer who plays as a midfielder for Sūduva Club and the Lithuania national team.

== Club career ==
Antanavičius made his professional debut for Celje in the Slovenian PrvaLiga on 22 February 2020, coming on as a substitute in the 90th minute for Žan Benedičič in the home match against Aluminij, which finished as a 2–0 win.

=== FK Sūduva ===
On 17 December 2025 officially announced, that Domantas Antanavičius signed with Sūduva Club.

== International career ==
Antanavičius made his debut for the Lithuania national team on 8 June 2024 in a 2–0 Baltic Cup victory against Latvia at the Daugava Stadium. He substituted Modestas Vorobjovas in the 76th minute.
