= Aleksandr Vulfov =

Russian footballer

Personal information
- Full name: Aleksandr Mikhailovich Vulfov
- Date of birth: 7 February 1998 (age 28)
- Place of birth: Moscow, Russia
- Height: 1.86 m (6 ft 1 in)
- Position: Midfielder

Youth career
- FC Strogino Moscow
- 2015–2017: FC Lokomotiv Moscow

Senior career*
Years	Team	Apps	(Gls)
2017–2019	FC Kazanka Moscow	39	(0)
2019–2020	FSC Dolgoprudny	12	(1)
2020–2021	FC Metallurg Vidnoye	9	(0)
2021	FC Krasny	9	(1)
2021–2022	FC Veles Moscow	31	(1)
2022	FC Akzhayik	6	(0)
- * Club domestic league appearances and goals

Aleksandr Mikhailovich Vulfov (Russian: Александр Михайлович Вульфов; born 7 February 1998) is a Russian former professional football player.

== Club career ==
He made his debut in the Russian Football National League for FC Veles Moscow on 10 July 2021 in a game against FC Yenisey Krasnoyarsk.
