= Aleksei Kozlov (footballer, born 1999) =

Russian footballer

Personal information
- Full name: Aleksei Yevgenyevich Kozlov
- Date of birth: 23 January 1999 (age 27)
- Place of birth: Sergiyev Posad, Moscow Oblast, Russia
- Height: 1.86 m (6 ft 1 in)
- Position: Goalkeeper

Team information
- Current team: Lokomotiv Tashkent
- Number: 1

Youth career
- 2010–2012: Lokomotiv Moscow
- 2012–2013: Orbita-Yunior Dzerzhinsky
- 2013–2014: UOR-5 Yegoryevsk
- 2014–2015: CSKA Moscow
- 2015–2017: Spartak Moscow

Senior career*
Years	Team	Apps	(Gls)
2017	Spartaks Jūrmala	0	(0)
2018	Utenis Utena	19	(0)
2019	Irtysh Omsk	1	(0)
2019–2021	Torpedo-BelAZ Zhodino	9	(0)
2021	Gomel	2	(0)
2022	Minsk	13	(0)
2022	Caspiy	4	(0)
2023	Naftan Novopolotsk	28	(0)
2024	Slavia Mozyr	19	(0)
2025	Neftchi Kochkor-Ata	25	(0)
2026–	Lokomotiv Tashkent	14	(0)
- * Club domestic league appearances and goals as of 29 July 2026

Aleksei Kozlov (Russian: Алексей Козлов; born 23 January 1999) is a Russian professional footballer who plays for Lokomotiv Tashkent.

His brother Yevgeni Kozlov is also a professional footballer.
