= Risto Jankov =

Macedonian footballer

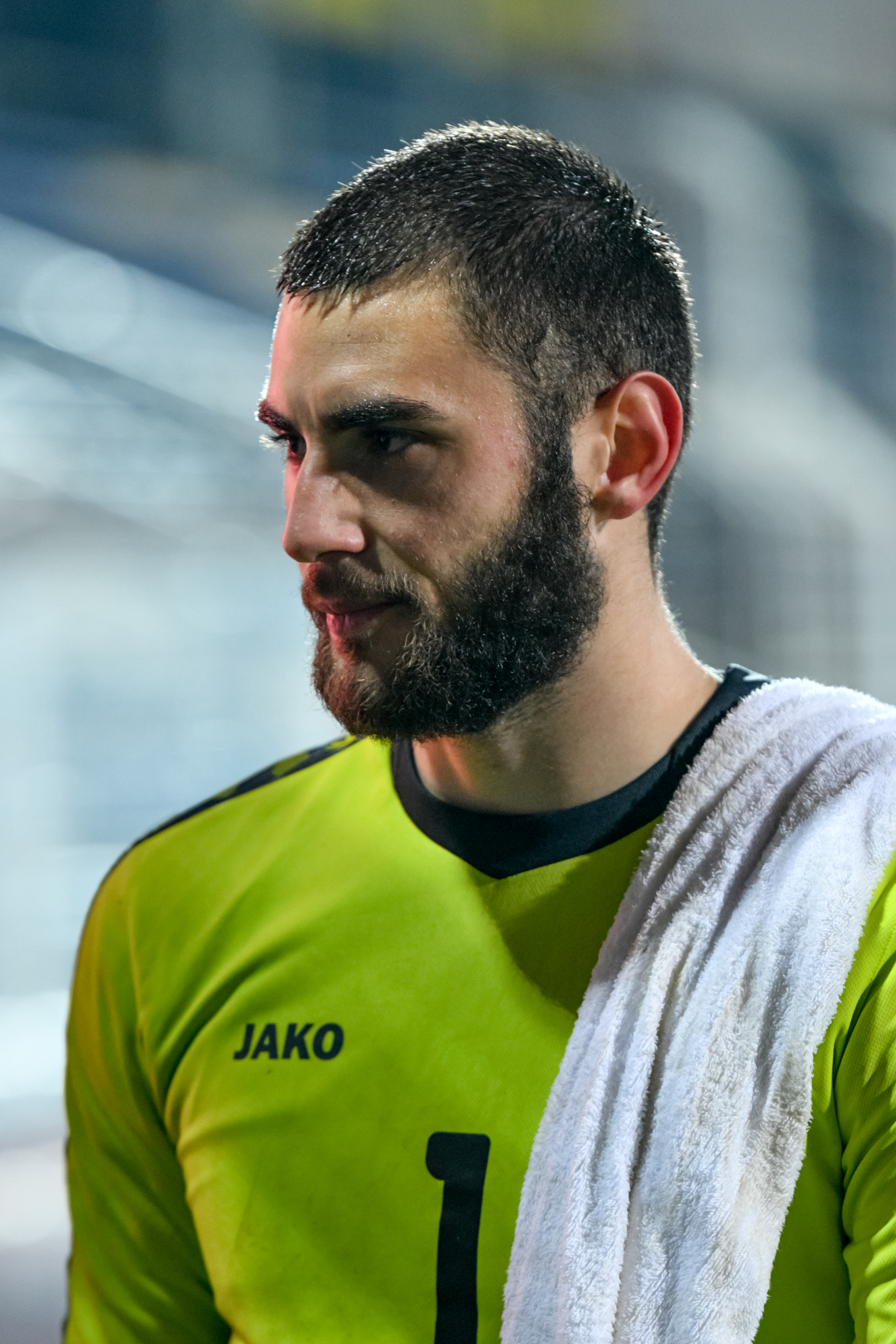
- Jankov in 2018

Personal information
- Date of birth: 5 September 1998 (age 28)
- Place of birth: Skopje, Macedonia
- Height: 1.90 m (6 ft 3 in)
- Position: Goalkeeper

Team information
- Current team: Makedonija GP
- Number: 12

Youth career
- –2015: Rabotnički

Senior career*
Years	Team	Apps	(Gls)
2015–2022	Rabotnički	71	(0)
2017	→ Lokomotiva Skopje (loan)		
2022	Caspiy Aktau	2	(0)
2022–2024	Politehnica Iași	15	(0)
2024	Bregalnica Štip	12	(0)
2024	Tikvesh	12	(0)
2025	Shkëndija	0	(0)
2025–	Makedonija GP	29	(0)

International career^{‡}
2014	Macedonia U17	2	(0)
2015–2016	Macedonia U18	3	(0)
2016	Macedonia U19	5	(0)
2017–2020	North Macedonia U21	17	(0)
- * Club domestic league appearances and goals as of 18 June 2026 ‡ National team caps and goals as of 20 May 2021

Risto Jankov (Macedonian: Ристо Јанков; born 5 September 1998) is a Macedonian footballer who plays as a goalkeeper for Makedonija GP.

== Club career ==
Jankov was promoted to the first team of Rabotnički in 2015. In August 2017, he was loaned to Lokomotiva Skopje in the Macedonian Second Football League, before returning to Rabotnički at the start of 2018. He made his first senior appearance for the Rabotnički in the Macedonian First Football League on 24 February 2018, coming on as a substitute in the 89th minute for outfielder Andrej Lazarov, after starting goalkeeper Daniel Bozinovski was sent off. The match finished as a 2–1 win for Rabotnički.

== International career ==
In February 2021, Jankov was selected for a short training camp of the North Macedonia national team at the Petar Miloševski Training Centre. The following month, Jankov received his first official call-up for the national team, as a member of the squad for the 2022 FIFA World Cup qualifying matches against Romania, Liechtenstein and Germany. He was first included on the team bench in their match against Liechtenstein, a 5–0 home win. On 20 May 2021, Jankov was called up by manager Igor Angelovski to the country's squad for the delayed UEFA Euro 2020 finals, the country's first major international tournament.

== Honours ==
Rabotnički

- Macedonian Cup runner-up: 2015–16

Politehnica Iași

- Liga II: 2022–23
