= Sékou Doumbia =

Ivorian footballer (born 1994)

Personal information
- Full name: Sékou Doumbia
- Date of birth: 11 February 1994 (age 32)
- Place of birth: Adzopé, Ivory Coast
- Height: 1.84 m (6 ft 1/2 in)
- Position: Midfielder

Youth career
- Egnanda de Zaranou

Senior career*
Years	Team	Apps	(Gls)
2014–2015	Saxan	10	(0)
2015–2016	→ Zaria Bălți (loan)	10	(0)
2016–2018	Slutsk	50	(1)
2019	Tambov	6	(0)
2019–2020	Armavir	15	(0)
2021	Hapoel Hadera	6	(0)
2022	Ordabasy	9	(0)
2022–2023	Maktaaral	22	(1)
2023–2024	Maccabi Herzliya	31	(4)
2025	Smorgon	23	(4)
- * Club domestic league appearances and goals as of 7 April 2026

Sékou Doumbia (born 11 February 1994) is an Ivorian footballer who plays as a midfielder.

== Career ==
In 2014, he joined Moldovan side Saxan. In 2015, he was transferred to Zaria Bălți. In the summer of 2016, he joined Belarusian club Slutsk.

On 21 July 2022, Maktaaral announced the signing of Doumbia.
