= Lucas Cardoso (footballer, born 1994) =

Brazilian footballer

Personal information
- Full name: Lucas Ferreira Cardoso
- Date of birth: 7 April 1994 (age 32)
- Place of birth: Araguaçu, Brazil
- Height: 1.84 m (6 ft 1/2 in)
- Position: Forward

Youth career
- 2014: Goianiense

Senior career*
Years	Team	Apps	(Gls)
2012–2013	CRAC	0	(0)
2013–2014	Itumbiara	5	(0)
2014–2015	Nacional-PR	10	(0)
2016–2017	Pelister	44	(17)
2018–2022	Partizani	20	(3)
2019	→ Drita (loan)	12	(1)
2020	→ Besa Kavajë (loan)	4	(1)
2022	Kyzylzhar	1	(0)
2022	Ballkani	5	(0)
2023	Al-Naft	0	(0)
2023	Persekat Tegal	4	(1)
- * Club domestic league appearances and goals as of 14 October 2023

Lucas Ferreira Cardoso (born 7 April 1994) is a Brazilian footballer who currently plays as a forward.

== Career statistics ==
=== Club ===
As of 29 March 2019.

Club	Season	League			Cup		Continental		Other		Total	
Club	Season	Division	Apps	Goals	Apps	Goals	Apps	Goals	Apps	Goals	Apps	Goals
Itumbiara	2013	—			0	0	–		5 (Note: Appearances in the Campeonato Goiano)	0	5	0
Nacional-PR	2015	—			0	0	–		10 (Note: Appearances in the Campeonato Paranaense)	0	10	0
Rio Branco (loan)	2016	Série D	0	0	3 (Note: Appearances in the Copa Verde)	0	–		0	0	3	0
FK Pelister	2016–17	Macedonian First Football League	29	11	4 (Note: Appearances in the Macedonian Cup)	1	–		0	0	33	12
FK Pelister	2017–18	Macedonian First Football League	15	6	2	2	2 (Note: Appearances in UEFA Europa League qualifying)	0	0	0	19	8
FK Pelister	Total		44	17	6	3	2	0	0	0	52	20
Partizani	2017–18	Kategoria Superiore	11	3	2 (Note: Appearances in the Albanian Cup)	0	–		0	0	13	3
Partizani	2018–19	Kategoria Superiore	5	0	1	0	–		0	0	6	0
Partizani	Total		16	3	3	0	0	0	0	0	19	3
Career total			60	20	9	3	2	0	15	0	86	23
