= Chidi Osuchukwu =

Nigerian footballer

Personal information
- Full name: Chidi Emma Osuchukwu
- Date of birth: 11 August 1993 (age 33)
- Place of birth: Benin City, Nigeria
- Height: 1.78 m (5 ft 10 in)
- Position: Midfielder

Team information
- Current team: PDRM
- Number: 23

Youth career
- Gateway

Senior career*
Years	Team	Apps	(Gls)
2012	Dolphins		
2013–2017	Braga	1	(0)
2013–2017	→ Braga B	98	(4)
2017–2019	Dinamo Brest	40	(5)
2020	Rukh Brest	11	(0)
2020	Tom Tomsk	7	(0)
2021	Ordabasy	18	(0)
2022	Turan	10	(2)
2022	Tobol	7	(1)
2023	Aksu	22	(2)
2024–	PDRM		

International career^{‡}
2013	Nigeria U20	2	(0)
- * Club domestic league appearances and goals as of 31 December 2023 ‡ National team caps and goals as of 5 June 2014

Chidi Emma Osuchukwu (born 11 October 1993) is a Nigerian professional footballer who plays as a midfielder who plays for PDRM.

== Club career ==
Between 2013 and 2017 he played for Braga B.

On 3 September 2020, Osuchukwu's club Rukh Brest announced his transfer to the Russian Premier League club FC Khimki. Khimki never confirmed the transfer and he was not registered with the RPL as a player of Khimki. On 16 October 2020 he signed with a different Russian club, Tom Tomsk.

On 27 February 2021, Ordabasy announced the signing of Osuchukwu.

On 6 February 2022, Turan announced the signing of Osuchukwu.
